= List of foreign Kategoria Superiore players =

This is a list of foreign players in the Kategoria Superiore, which commenced play in 1930. The following players must meet both of the following two criteria:

1. Have played at least one Kategoria Superiore game. Players who were signed by Kategoria Superiore clubs, but only played in lower league, cup and/or European games, or did not play in any competitive games at all, are not included.
2. Are considered foreign, i.e., outside Kategoria Superiore determined by the following:

A player is considered foreign if his allegiance is not to play for the national team of Albania.

More specifically,

- If a player has been capped on international level, the national team is used; if he has been capped by more than one country, the highest level (or the most recent) team is used. These include Albanian players with dual citizenship.
- If a player has not been capped on international level, his country of birth is used, except those who were born abroad from Albanian parents or moved to Albania at a young age, and those who clearly indicated to have switched his nationality to another nation.

Clubs listed are those for which the player has played at least one Kategoria Superiore game — and seasons are those in which the player has played at least one Premier League game. Note that seasons, not calendar years, are used. For example, "1992–95" indicates that the player has played in every season from 1992–93 to 1994–95, but not necessarily every calendar year from 1992 to 1995. Therefore, a player should always have a listing under at least two years — for instance, a player making his debut in 2011, during the 2011–12 season, will have '2011–12' after his name. This follows general practice in expressing sporting seasons in Albania.

In bold: players who have played at least one Kategoria Superiore game in the current season (2023–24), and are still at a club for which they have played. This does not include current players of a Kategoria Superiore club who have not played a Kategoria Superiore game in the current season.

Details correct as of 22 January 2024

== Andorra ==
- Sergi Moreno – Vllaznia – 2011–12

== Angola ==
- Pedro Bengui – Luftëtari — 2016–17
- Silas Daniel Satonho — Luftëtari — 2016–17

== Argentina ==
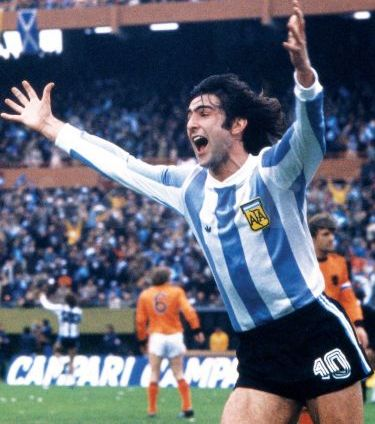
1978 FIFA World Cup winner Mario Kempes joined Lushnja in 1996 as a player-manager

- Gabriel Barbosa — Kukësi — 2022–23
- Miguel Barreto — Dinamo Tirana — 2004–05
- Daniel Alejandro Bertoya — Dinamo Tirana — 2008–09
- Nicolas Bosoletti — Dinamo Tirana — 2004–05
- Diego Celis — Bylis — 2019–20
- Pablo Cabañas — Dinamo Tirana — 2002–03
- Cristian Andrés Campozano — Dinamo Tirana — 2008–09
- Alejandro Carrusca — Vllaznia — 2008–09
- Rubén Cecco — Dinamo Tirana — 2008–09
- Franco Cingolani — Dinamo Tirana — 2004–05
- Martín Dedyn — Tërbuni — 2015–16
- Nicolás Delmonte — Dinamo Tirana — 2009–10
- Leandro Escudero — Dinamo Tirana — 2005–06
- **Rodrigo Faust** — **Teuta** — 2023–
- Daniel Fernández — Dinamo Tirana — 2002–03
- Alejandro Frezzotti — Dinamo Tirana — 2004–05
- Esteban García — Dinamo Tirana — 2010–11
- Federico Haberkorn Dinamo Tirana — 2015–16
- Sebastián Ibars — Flamurtari — 2019–20
- Mario Kempes — Lushnja — 1996–97
- Héctor David Ledesma — Dinamo Tirana — 2004–05
- Lucas Malacarne — Dinamo Tirana, Kastrioti, Kukësi — 2009–14
- Nestor Martinena — Dinamo Tirana, Kamza — 2010–11, 2018–19
- **Rodrigo Migone** — **Erzeni** — 2023–
- Néstor Moiraghi — Dinamo Tirana — 2004–05
- Fabián Muñoz — Bylis — 2019–20
- Hours Alejandro Palladino — Dinamo Tirana — 2008–09
- Miguel Eduardo Prado — Dinamo Tirana — 2002–03
- Agustín Rojas — Erzeni — 2023–24
- Mario Antonio Romero — Dinamo Tirana — 2008–09
- Alfredo Rafael Sosa — Dinamo Tirana, Skënderbeu, Flamurtari, Laçi — 2009–11, 2012–13, 2014–15
- Agustín González Tapia — Dinamo Tirana — 2008–09
- Maximiliano Timpanaro — Dinamo Tirana — 2009–10
- Agustín Torassa — Partizani, Flamurtari, Tirana — 2015–17, 2018–21
- Juan Manuel Varea — Bylis — 2015–16
- Oscar Luis Vera — Dinamo Tirana — 2004–05
- Pablo Lorenzo Vittori — Dinamo Tirana — 2002–03
- Daniel Zaccanti — Tirana, Shkumbini, Dinamo Tirana — 2002–04
- Walter Zermatten — Dinamo Tirana — 2004–05
- Angel Gonzalez Zuluaga — Bylis — 2019–20

== Australia ==
- **Melos Bajrami** — **Skënderbeu** — 2020–
- Labinot Haliti — Teuta — 2007–08
- Goce Petrovski — Besëlidhja — 2007–08

== Austria ==
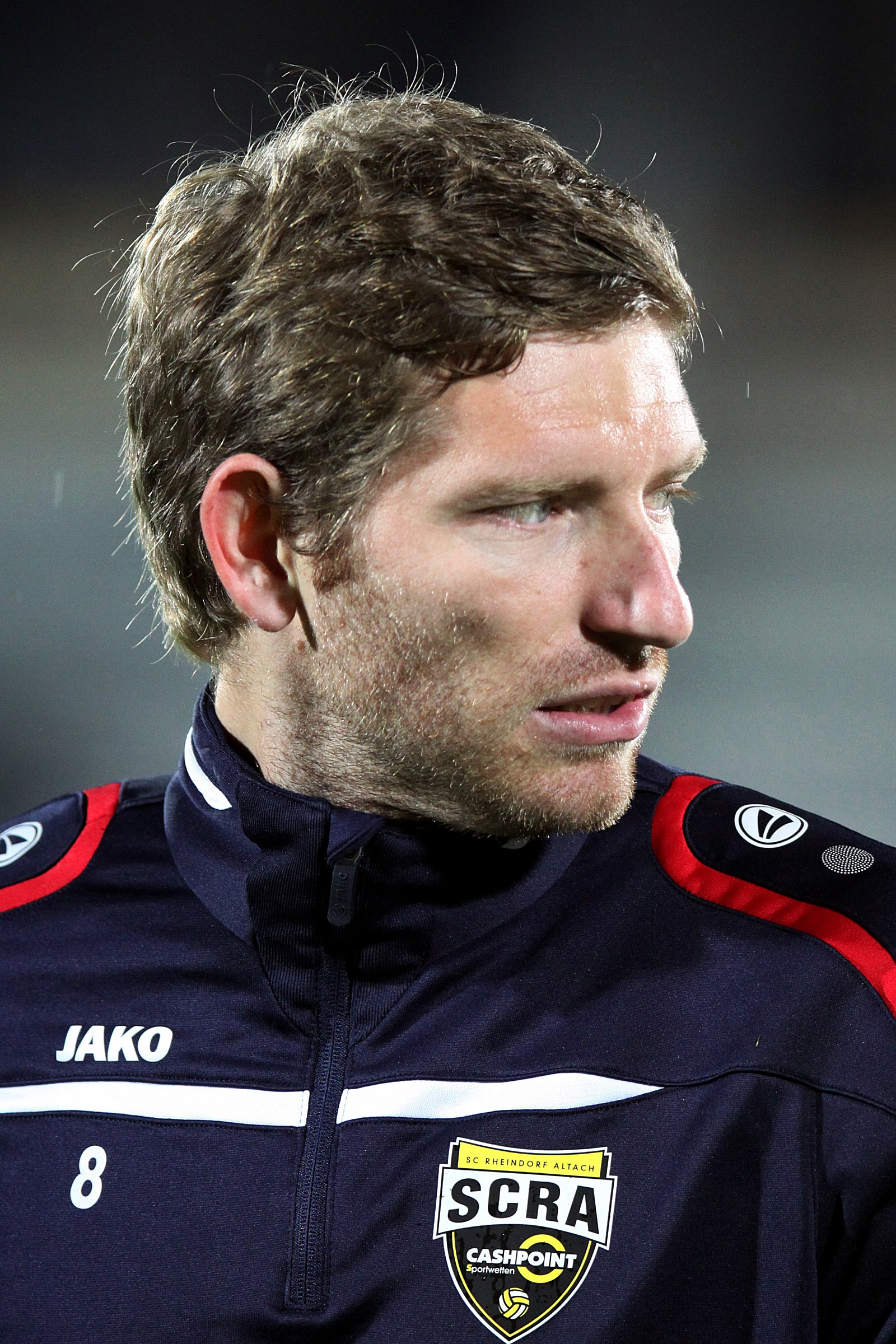
Ronald Gërçaliu was born in Tirana, Albania but represented Austria national football team at Euro 2008

- Albin Gashi — Kukësi — 2020–22
- Ronald Gërçaliu — Tirana — 2015–16
- Mehdi Hetemaj — Kukësi — 2020–21
- Butrint Vishaj — Skënderbeu, Kastrioti — 2010–12

== Azerbaijan ==
- Vusal Isgandarli — Egnatia — 2023–24
- Eltun Turabov — Bylis — 2019–20

== Bahamas (The Bahamas) ==
- Cameron Hepple — Tirana — 2011–12

== Bahrain ==
- Mahmood Al-Ajmi — Tirana — 2011–12

== Belgium ==
- **Kristi Kullaj** — **Partizani** — 2021–
- **Matias Lloci** — **Teuta** — 2023–
- Marvin Ogunjimi — Skënderbeu — 2016–17
- Donjet Shkodra – Flamurtari, Skënderbeu, Kukësi — 2016–19
- **Sebastjan Spahiu** — Laçi, **Egnatia** — 2021–

== Benin ==
- Félicien Singbo — Vllaznia — 2004–05

== Bolivia ==
- Augusto Andaveris — Tirana — 2005–06
- Percy Colque — Tirana — 2005–06

== Bosnia and Herzegovina ==
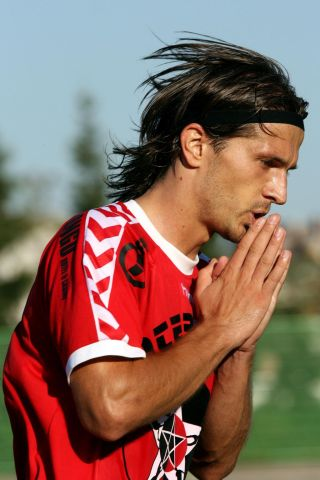
Ivan Jolić (pictured) and Vlado Marković became the first players from Bosnia and Herzegovina to win the Kategoria Superiore when they won the 2010–11 Kategoria Superiore title with Skënderbeu

- Semir Bajraktarević — Flamurtari — 2019–20
- **Emanullah Blažević** — **Erzeni** — 2023–
- Anel Dedić — Teuta — 2017–18
- Haris Dilaver — Vllaznia — 2020–21
- Edin Ferizović – Apolonia 2009, Shkumbini 2010, Besa 2010
- Renato Gojković — Partizani — 2017–19
- Aldin Gurdijeljac – Shkumbini (2011)
- Sead Hadžibulić — Apolonia, Dinamo Tirana, Vllaznia, Laçi, Besa — 2008–11
- Semir Hadžibulić — Apolonia, Gramozi, Besa, Vllaznia — 2008–2011, 2015–16
- Nedim Halilović — Dinamo Tirana — 2008–09
- Haris Harba — Kukësi, Bylis — 2018–19, 2020–21
- Elvedin Herić — Vllaznia — 2021–23
- Kenan Horić — Kukësi — 2020–21
- Kenan Hreljić — Teuta — 2019–20
- Ferid Idrizović — Teuta (2006)
- Tarik Isić — Kukësi — 2022–23
- Nemanja Janičić — Luftëtari — 2018–19
- Igor Joksimović – Shkumbini (2009)
- Ivan Jolić — Skënderbeu — 2010–11
- Mladen Kukrika – Kastrioti (2014)
- Numan Kurdić — Kukësi — 2020–21
- Bojan Marković – Teuta (2017)
- Vlado Marković — Skënderbeu, Teuta — 2009–12
- Dragan Mićić – Besëlidhja (2007–2008)
- Ahmed Mujdragić — Shkumbini — 2008–11
- Adin Mulaosmanović – Elbasani (2007)
- **Zinedin Mustedanagić** — **Vllaznia** — 2021–
- Almir Pliska – Partizani (2014)
- Nihad Šero — Bylis — 2020–21
- Bojan Vučinić – Dinamo Tirana (2002–2003)
- **Mladen Žižović** – Tirana (2010–2011)

== Botswana ==
- Robert Maposa Simione — Skënderbeu — 2007–18

== Brazil ==
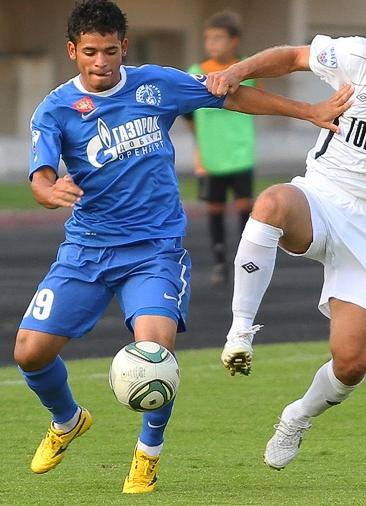
Elton Calé won the 2016–17 Kategoria Superiore with Kukësi, the club's first and only title

- Abílio – Partizani (2002–2004), Vllaznia (2004–2005)
- Renato Abonicio – Teuta (2002–2003)
- Ademir – Skënderbeu (2012–2016), Laçi (2016)
- Adenilson – Partizani (2001–2004), Apolonia (2006–2007)
- Leonel Adriano – Vllaznia (2002–2003), Elbasani (2003–2004), Partizani (2004–2005)
- Bruno Agnello – Laçi (2016–2017)
- **Andrei Alba** — **Erzeni** — 2023–
- Bruno Aquino – Laçi (2016)
- Luis Fernando Alex – Vllaznia (2004–2005)
- Allisson – Kukësi (2015)
- Danilo Alves — Flamurtari — 2015–19
- Bruno Arrabal – Kamza (2017–)
- Marco Aurélio — Luftëtari — 2017–18
- Bruno Barbosa – Partizani (2008)
- Robson Barbosa – Partizani (2008)
- Sandro Barbosa – Apolonia (2002–2003)
- Bernardo Barbosa Carvalho – Partizani (2004–2005)
- Breno Basso – Partizani (2008)
- Marcos Berdague – Flamurtari (1996–1997)
- Jhonatan Bernardo – Teuta (2016)
- Birungueta – Kukësi (2015)
- Marcelo Brachini – Partizani (2002–2004), Egnatia (2005–2006)
- Elton Calé — Kukësi, Flamurtari, Tirana — 2016–21
- Alan Calbergue — Erzeni — 2022–23
- Ronaille Calheira – Bylis (2015)
- Lucas Caniggia – Flamurtari (2016–)
- Alan Cardec – Partizani (2005–2006)
- Lucas Cardoso — **Partizani** — 2018–22
- Antonio Carioca – Partizani (2001–2004)
- Felipe Carioca – Partizani (2008)
- Jean Carioca – Kukësi (2015–)
- Cassius Vinicius Coelho — Vllaznia — 2020–21
- Renato Coelho – Besa (2003–2004)
- **William Cordeiro** — Kukësi, Partizani, **Laçi** — 2018–21, 2023–
- **Christian** — **Laçi** — 2023–
- Devid — Kastrioti, Tirana — 2020–22
- Douglas – Flamurtari (2014)
- Djair – Skënderbeu (2015)
- Ebert — Kukësi — 2022–23
- Edmílson – Bylis (2016)
- Edu – Lushnja (1996–1997)
- **Guilherme Eller** – **Egnatia** – 2021–
- Enck — Erzeni — 2022–23
- Erasmo – Vllaznia (2002–2003)
- Maicón Esquerda — Laçi — 2016–18
- Esquerdinha – Skënderbeu (2015–2016)
- Esquerdinha — Bylis — 2022–23
- Vitor Feijão — Kukësi — 2021–23
- **Fernandinho** — **Partizani** — 2021–
- Fernando – Skënderbeu (2013)
- Júnior Ferrim – Partizani (2004–2006)
- Flávio – Flamurtari (2007–2009)
- Erick Flores – Kukësi (2015–2016)
- Cate Fonseca – Luftëtari (2013), Kastrioti (2013), Lushnja (2014)
- Formiga – Shkumbini (2002–2003), Partizani (2005)
- Gilberto Fortunato – Tirana (2014, 2015), Flamurtari (2014)
- Gabriel – Partizani (2016)
- Washington Galvão – Apolonia (2007–2008)
- Alexandre Cardoso Garcia — Bylis — 2020–21
- Geraldinho – Partizani (2001–2003), Lushnja (2003–2004), Vllaznia (2005–2006), Apolonia (2006–2007)
- Gigante — Vllaznia — 2021–22
- Giovanni – Teuta (1999–2001)
- **Bruno Gomes** — **Vllaznia** — 2023–
- Filipe Gomes – Partizani (2016)
- Leandro Gomes – Vllaznia (2005–2006)
- Semião Granado – Kukësi (2015)
- Philippe Guimarães – Kukësi (2016)
- Alan Henrique — Bylis — 2020–21
- Carlos Henrique – Flamurtari (2020–)
- João Henrique – Flamurtari (2016)
- Felipe Hereda – Kukësi (2016)
- Hugo — Teuta — 2017–18
- Hugo – Tirana (2016)
- Hygor — Vllaznia — 2019–20
- **Jackson, born 1991** — Luftëtari, **Teuta** — 2018–19, 2020–
- Jackson, born 1999 – Egnatia – 2021–23
- Jefferson – Kukësi (2014–2015)
- Jildemar – Teuta (2016)
- Victor Juffo — Flamurtari — 2017–18
- Juliano – Kukësi (2015)
- Iran Junior — Teuta — 2020–21
- **Stênio Júnior** — **Partizani** — 2020–
- Juriander – Partizani (2005–2006), Shkumbini (2006), Gramozi (2008–2011)
- Marcelo Júnior – Partizani (2001–2002)
- **Daniel Justino** — **Laçi** — 2023–
- Kaina — Vllaznia, Kastrioti, Tirana — 2021–24
- Vitor Leão — Erzeni — 2022–23
- Rafael Leandro – Teuta (2014)
- Matheus Leiria — Kukësi — 2020–21
- Léo Lelis — Kamza — 2016–18
- Leomir – Kukësi (2015)
- Mateus Lima – Kukësi (2015–2016)
- Joner Lopez – Partizani (2004–2005)
- **Lorran** — Bylis, **Dinamo City** — 2020–21, 2022–
- Lynneeker – Flamurtari (2017–)
- Maranhão, born 1992 — Vllaznia — 2019–20
- **Maranhão, born 1995** — **Dinamo Tirana** — 2021–
- Neto Marcolino — Bylis — 2020–21
- Marconi – Skënderbeu (2014)
- Dhiego Martins – Skënderbeu (2014–2015)
- Leonardo Martins – Gramozi (2008–2011)
- Mauricio – Elbasani (2014)
- Maurício – Flamurtari (2017–)
- **Yuri Merlim** — **Skënderbeu** — 2023–
- Moraes Jr. — Kastrioti, Kukësi, Skënderbeu — 2020–23
- Felipe Moreira – Kukësi (2015–)
- Marco Morgon — Bylis — 2020–21
- **Matheus Motta** — **Kukësi** — 2023–
- Rodrigo do Nascimento – Partizani (2003, 2005–2006)
- Jean Neves – Apolonia (2007–2009)
- Patrick Nonato — Erzeni — 2022–23
- **Índio Oliveira** — **Flamurtari** — 2019–
- Fernando Paulinho – Besëlidhja (2008)
- **Patrick** — **Tirana** — 2020–
- **Pedro** – **Egnatia** – 2021–
- Pericles – Kukësi (2014–2015), Laçi (2016)
- Márcio Pit – Kukësi (2015)
- Lucas Ramos — Flamurtari, Laçi — 2019–21
- **Marcos Ramos** — **Skënderbeu** — 2023–
- Rangel – Kukësi (2016–2017)
- Williams Recife – Kukësi (2016)
- Renatinho – Skënderbeu (2016)
- Renato – Apolonia (2006)
- Aluidi Ribeiro – Apolonia (2006)
- Bernardo Ribeiro – Skënderbeu (2011–2012)
- Rinaldo – Vllaznia (2005)
- **Paulo Júnior** — Skënderbeu, **Laçi** — 2021–22, 2023–
- Paulo Roberto – Flamurtari (2007)
- Roger — Kukësi, Kastrioti — 2018–19
- Mauricio José Rodriguez – Partizani (2004), Dinamo Tirana (2005)
- Roma – Partizani (2008)
- Murilo Rosa — Skënderbeu — 2021–22
- Felipe Ryan — Kukësi — 2023–24
- Jô Santos — Bylis — 2022–23
- Marko dos Santos – Apolonia (2003–2005), Gramozi (2006–2010), Besa (2010–2011)
- Wilson dos Santos – Apolonia (2002–2003, 2006)
- Serginho — Skënderbeu, Laçi — 2016–20
- Denis Silva – Bylis (2010–2013), Skënderbeu (2012), Kastrioti (2013–2014)
- **Denisson Silva** — **Dinamo Tirana/City** — 2021–22, 2023–
- Leandro da Silva – Dinamo Tirana (2003–2006), Vllaznia (2007–2008), Partizani (2006–2007), Gramozi (2008–2009)
- Luiz da Silva – Apolonia (2011), Teuta (2012–2014)
- Victor da Silva — Vllaznia, Partizani — 2020–24
- Sílvio — Vllaznia — 2018–20
- Emerson Sinho — Vllaznia — 2019–20
- Stênio — Laçi — 2019–20
- Alexandre Talento — Kukësi — 2023–24
- Taubaté – Laçi (2016)
- Teco — Laçi — 2019–21
- Leandro Teófilo – Vllaznia (2009)
- Joseta de Trinidade – Partizani (2005)
- **Tuxa** — **Flamurtari** — 2019–
- Enric Vale – Vllaznia (2004–2005)
- Vicente — Bylis — 2019–20
- **Jean Victor** — **Skënderbeu** — 2020–
- Vlademir – Lushnja (1996–1997)
- Welder — Flamurtari — 2019–20
- Wéverton – Kukësi (2016–)
- Wilker – Tërbuni (2016)
- Alex Willian – Tirana (2016)
- **Andrey Yago** — **Vllaznia** — 2023–

== Bulgaria ==
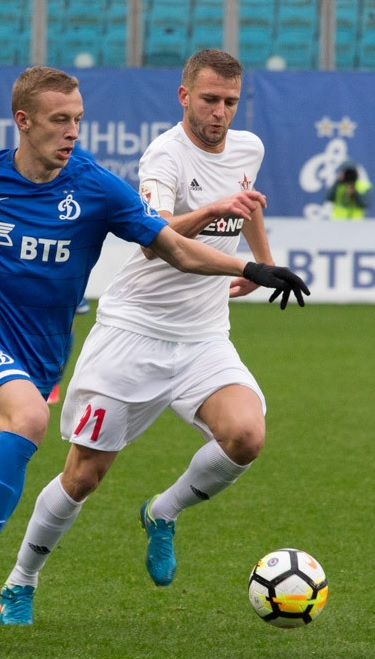
Ventsislav Hristov played 4 games and scored once during the 2015–16 season with Skënderbeu

- **Sasho Angelov** – Flamurtari (2002)
- **Nikolay Arabov** – Tirana (1992–1993)
- G. Bosceski – Apolonia (2001–2002)
- Yuri Dimitrov – Apolonia (2001–2002)
- Ignat Dishliev – Partizani (2014)
- Dragomir Draganov – Flamurtari (2011)
- Konstantin Gerganchev – Apolonia (2000–2002)
- Ventsislav Hristov — Skënderbeu — 2015–16
- Angel Iliev – Flamurtari (2002)
- Martin Kavdanski – Tirana (2015)
- Martin Kerchev – Teuta (2011)
- Mario Kirev — Kamza — 2018–19
- Miroslav Mindev – Lushnja (2003–2004)
- Radostin Rusev – Apolonia (2001–2002)

== Burkina Faso ==
- Moussa Kaboré — Bylis — 2008–09

== Burundi ==
- Selemani Ndikumana — Tirana — 2013–15

== Cameroon ==
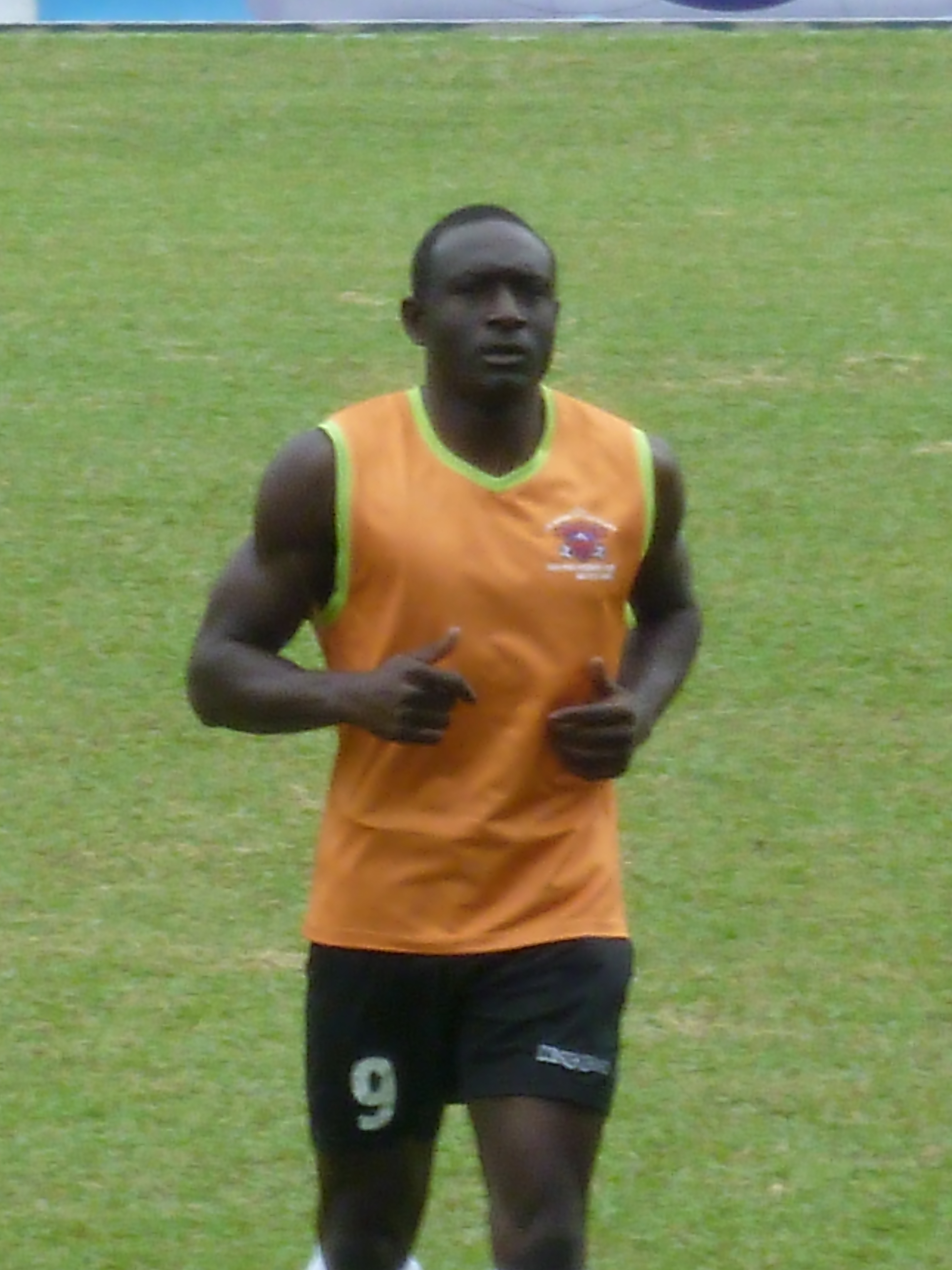
Guy Madjo played for Bylis during the 2015–16 season, featuring in 15 games and scoring twice

- **Patrice Abanda** – Besa (2006–2007)
- Mohamadolu Abdouraman – Shkumbini (2006–2007), Bylis (2007–2009)
- Michael Ajegba – Elbasani (2003), Flamurtari (2004)
- Mengbwa Akamba – Shkumbini (2005–2006), Elbasani (2006–2007), Skënderbeu (2008)
- Manuel Bikoula – Besa (2005–2009)
- Malek Binogol – Besa (2006–2007), Kastrioti (2007)
- **Pierre Boya** – Kukësi (2014)
- Edy-Nicolas Boyom — Luftëtari, Kastrioti — 2016–17, 2018–19, 2020–21
- **Ivan Djantou** — **Skënderbeu** — 2023–
- Moustapha Djidjiwa – Partizani (2017)
- Timothe Ebanda – Besa (2006–2007)
- François Endene – Besa (2006–2008)
- Essama Etogo – Tirana (2011)
- Anicet Eyenga – Elbasani (2006)
- Steeve Gerard Fankà – Luftëtari (2012)
- Abade Narcisse Fish – Tirana (2006–2007), Flamurtari (2007–2008)
- Alain N'Koulou – Flamurtari (2006)
- Guy Madjo – Bylis (2010)
- Emmanuel Mbella – Bylis (2015–2016)
- Roger Pandong – Skënderbeu (2005–2006, 2008), Flamurtari (2006), Luftëtari (2007)
- Ghislain Taviko – Luftëtari (2006–2007), Vllaznia (2007)
- **Bernard Tchoutang** – Elbasani (2007)
- Michel Vaillant – Bylis (2019)
- **Jean Paul Yontcha** – Elbasani (2015)
- Tabort Etaka Preston – Kastrioti (2018)

== Canada ==
- Romedi Llapi — Flamurtari — 2018–20

== Cape Verde ==
- José Semedo — Tirana — 2013–14

== Chile ==
- Sebastián Toro — Laçi — 2018–19

== Colombia ==
- Juan David Martínez — Kukësi — 2022–23
- Juan Camilo Mesa — Dinamo City — 2023–24
- Andrés Montero – Luftëtari (2016)
- Diómedes Peña – Tirana (2005–2006)
- Carlos Robles Rocha – Partizani (2015–2016)

== Congo (Republic of the Congo) ==
- **Archange Bintsouka** — **Partizani** — 2022–
- Richard Bokatola – Vllaznia (2002–2006), Partizani (2006), Flamurtari (2006–2007), Kastrioti (2007), Elbasani (2008), Lushnja (2008–2009)
- **Dzon Delarge** – **Egnatia** – 2021–
- Herby Fortunat – Besa 2005–2006, 2007–2009, Tirana (2013)
- Kévin Koubemba – Teuta – 2021–22
- Chandrel Massanga — Partizani — 2021–23
- Merveille Ndockyt — Tirana — 2016–17
- Moise Nkounkou — Tirana — 2016–17
- Lionel Samba — Bylis — 2020–21

== Costa Rica ==
- **Jurguens Montenegro** – **Egnatia** – 2023–

== Croatia ==
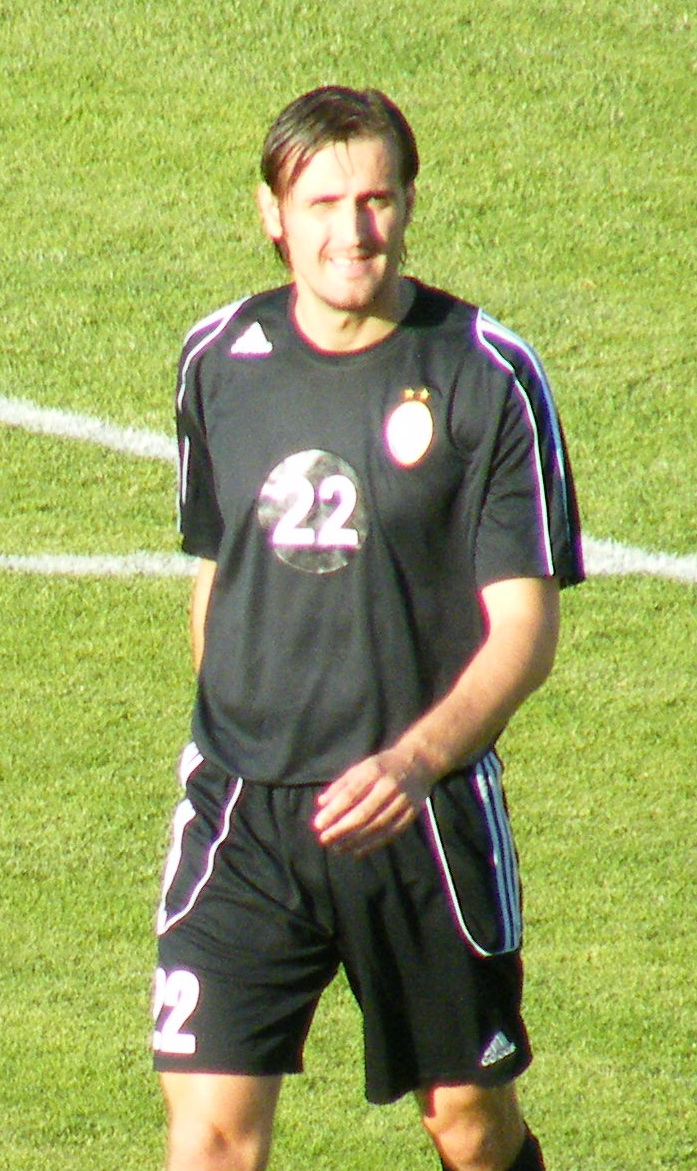
Pero Pejić is the highest-scoring foreign player in the league's history with 141 goals in 208 appearances

- Robert Alviž – Flamurtari (2008–2009), Kastrioti (2010–2011)
- Ante Aralica — Vllaznia — 2021–23
- Ivan Babić – Kastrioti (2010–2011)
- Boris Baković – Kastrioti (2010)
- Matej Bagarić – Laçi (2015)
- Edi Baša — Kukësi — 2021–23
- Marko Bašić – Vllaznia (2008–2009), Flamurtari (2009), Kastrioti (2011)
- Mario Bilen – Flamurtari (2010)
- Luko Biskup – Skënderbeu (2010–2012), Kukësi (2012–2013)
- Boris Bjelkanović – Lushnja (2013–2014)
- Dario Bodrušić – Dinamo Tirana (2007-2009)
- **Goran Brajković** – Flarmurtari (2008-2009)
- Mate Brajković – Flarmurtari (2007)
- Davor Bratić – Skënderbeu (2010–2012), Flamurtari (2012–2013), Kukësi (2013)
- Hrvoje Bukovski — Luftëtari — 2018–19
- Stipe Buljan — Laçi — 2010–16
- Tomislav Bušić — Vllaznia, Tirana, Flamurtari, Teuta — 2013–15, 2016–19
- Marin Con – Flamurtari (2008-2009)
- Kristijan Čaval – Dinamo Tirana (2005-2006)
- Anton Dedaj – Flarmurtari (2007-2008)
- Matko Djarmati – Skënderbeu (2009), Kastrioti (2010), Besa (2011), Dinamo Tirana (2011–2012)
- Duško Dukić – Bylis (2016), Korabi (2016)
- Antun Dunković – Partizani (2014)
- Matija Dvorneković – Kukësi (2016–2017)
- Nikola Eller — Laçi — 2018–19
- Andrija Filipović — Partizani — 2021–22
- Ivan Fuštar – Flamurtari (2015)
- Ivan Galić — Flamurtari, Laçi — 2016–17, 2018–19
- Vedran Gerc – Tirana (2013)
- Dejan Godar – Bylis (2009)
- Goran Granić – Dinamo Tirana (2007-2009)
- Damir Grgić — Kastrioti — 2021–22
- Ante Hrkać — Teuta — 2017–18
- **Danijel Hrman** – Tirana (2007)
- Ivan Jovanović – Tërbuni (2016)
- Pëllumb Jusufi – Dinamo Tirana (2008-2009), Kastrioti (2009-2010), Tomori (2012)
- Zoran Kastel – Dinamo Tirana (2005-2007)
- Lek Kćira – Tirana (2008-2009)
- Vice Kendeš — Laçi — 2018–19
- Mateo Kocijan — Partizani — 2023–24
- Saša Maras – Erzeni (2001-2003)
- Mario Mijatović – Kukësi (2016)
- **Božo Mikulić** — **Partizani** — 2023–24
- Marin Mudrazija — Kastrioti — 2021–22
- Branko Panić – Flamurtari (2007-2009)
- Pero Pejić – Dinamo Tirana (2007–2008), Tirana (2010–2011), Flamurtari (2012), Skënderbeu (2012–2014), Kukësi (2014–2015, 2016–2017)
- Darko Perić – Elbasani (2006-2007)
- Marko Pervan — Skënderbeu — 2018–19
- Frane Petričević – Dinamo Tirana (2008-2009)
- Toni Pezo – Tirana (2008–2009), Flamurtari (2012–2013)
- Mirko Plantić – Vllaznia (2009)
- Marko Radaš — Skënderbeu, Laçi — 2011–19
- Mario Sačer – Partizani (2014)
- Dino Špehar — Kukësi — 2018–19
- Željko Tomić – Skënderbeu (2012–2014)
- Mario Vasilj — Apolonia — 2020–21
- Domagoj Verhas – Dinamo Tirana (2005-2006)
- Goran Vinčetić – Dinamo Tirana (2005-2008)
- Ivor Weitzer — Vllaznia — 2016–17
- Filip Žderić — Kukësi — 2017–18
- Ante Živković — Kukësi — 2022–23

== Cuba ==
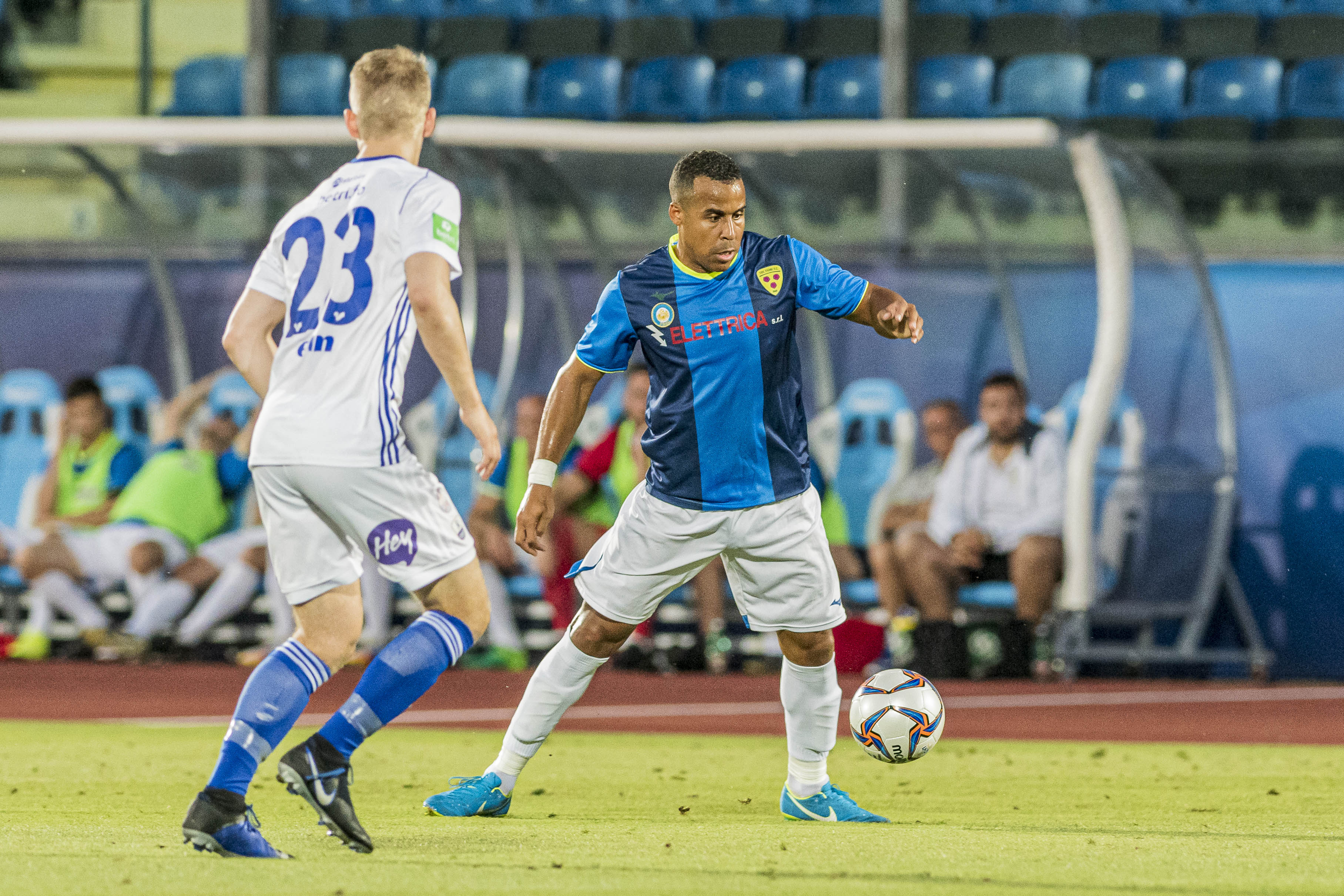
All 4 of Joel Apezteguía's goals in the Kategoria Superiore came in a single 6–2 win against Lushnja

- Joel Apezteguía — Teuta — 2012–13

== Czech Republic ==
- Miloslav Kousal – Vllaznia (2008–2009)
- **Petr Trapp** – Flamurtari (2015)

== DR Congo (Democratic Republic of the Congo) ==
- Archi Fataki – Kastrioti (2012–2013), Lushnja (2013)
- Landry Mulemo — Vllaznia — 2016–17
- **Delain Sasa** – Vllaznia (2001–2002, 2007–2008), Partizani (2003, 2005–2006), Flamurtari (2006–2007), Bylis (2008)

== Egypt ==
- Mohamed El-Ghazllan — Tirana — 2001–02
- Hassan Nasr — Tirana — 2001–02
- **Khalil Thaleb** — **Laçi** — 2023–

== El Salvador ==
- Roberto Domínguez — Partizani — 2020–21

== England ==
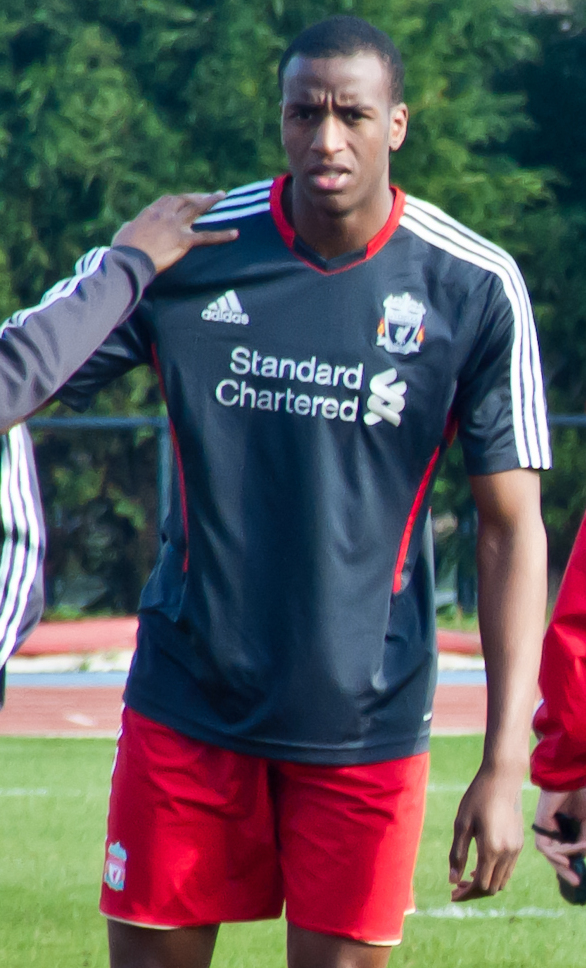
Former Liverpool forward Michael Ngoo joined Tirana in 2017

- **Andi Janjeva** — **Partizani** — 2023–
- Layton Ndukwu — Kukësi — 2022–23
- Michael Ngoo — Tirana — 2018–20, 2021–2022
- Jamie Phoenix – Vllaznia, Bylis, Luftëtari — 2009–11, 2012–13
- **Ronald Sobowale** — **Laçi** — 2023–

== Equatorial Guinea ==
- **Basilio Ndong** — **Tirana** — 2025–

== Ethiopia ==
- Beneyam Demte — Skënderbeu — 2017–19

== Finland ==
- Kevin Mombilo — Partizani — 2018–19
- Lum Rexhepi — Partizani — 2018–19
- Tim Väyrynen — Tirana — 2020–21

== France ==
- Addnane El Archi – Bylis (2009)
- Abdelaye Diakité – Bylis (2015)
- **Youba Dramé** – **Egnatia** – 2023–
- Chris Gadi – Egnatia – 2021–22
- Arnaud Guedj — Skënderbeu — 2018–19
- Ardian Krasniqi — Teuta — 2017–18
- Laurent Mohellebi – Tirana (2008–2009)
- **Mickaël Panos** — **Vllaznia** — 2021–
- **Atdhe Rashiti** — **Kukësi** — 2022–
- **Xhuliano Skuka** — Dinamo Tirana, **Partizani** — 2021–
- Chafik Tigroudja — Kukësi — 2018–19
- Brice Tutu — Bylis — 2022–23

== Gabon ==
- **Georges Ambourouet** – Dinamo Tirana (2010–2011)
- **Romuald Ntsitsigui** – Tirana (2016–)

== Gambia (The Gambia) ==
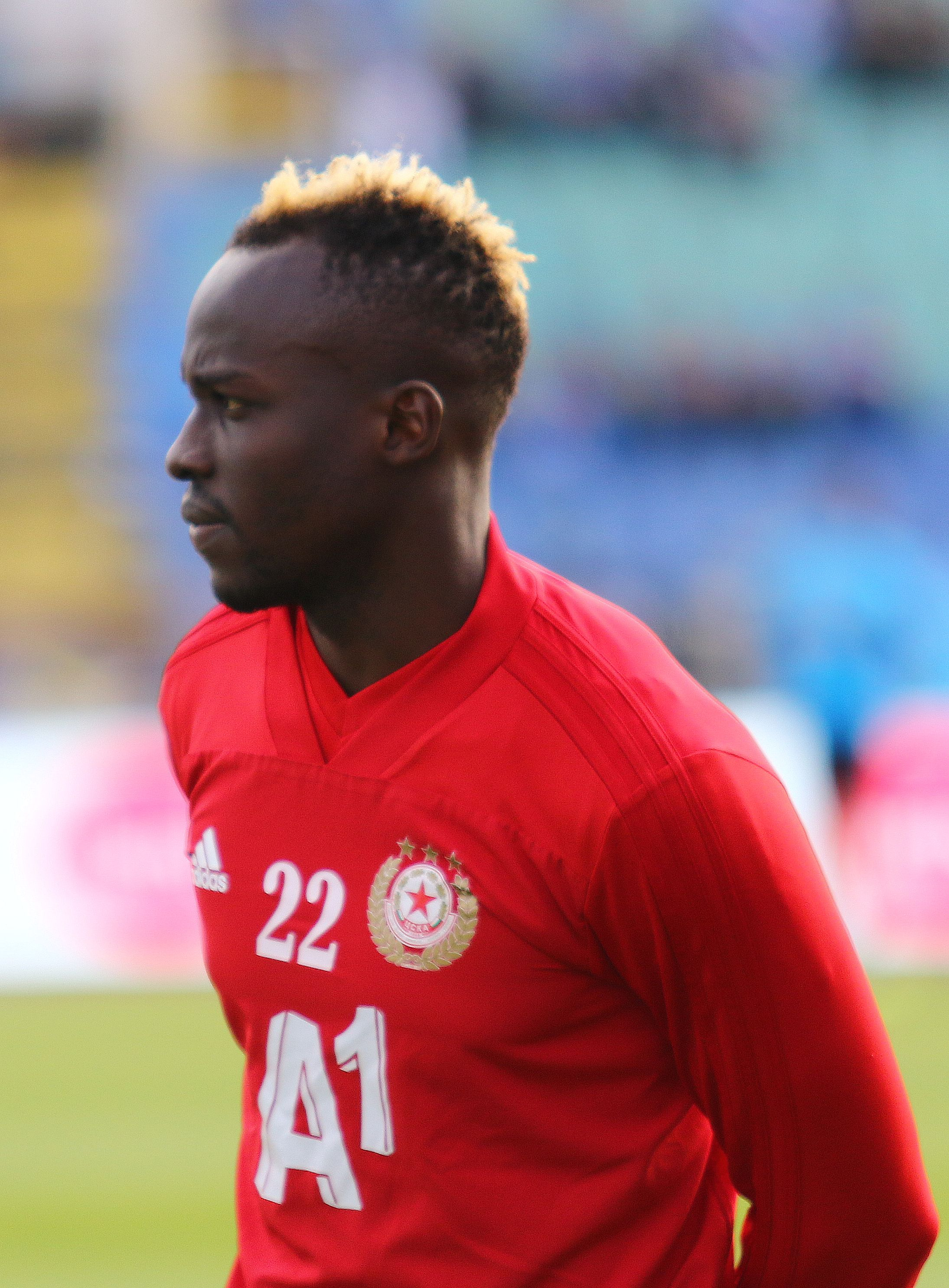
Ali Sowe won the golden boot and the league title in his only season in Albania with Skënderbeu

- **Karamba Gassama** — **Dinamo City** — 2023–2026
- Ismaila Jagne — Teuta, Skënderbeu — 2007–08
- Tijan Jaiteh — Partizani — 2018–19
- Fallou Njie — Skënderbeu — 2020–21
- Ali Sowe — Skënderbeu — 2017–18

== Georgia (Georgia (country)) ==
- Irakli Dzaria — Kukësi — 2017–19
- **Nikoloz Gelashvili** – Flamurtari (2014)
- **Giorgi Popkhadze** – Flamurtari (2015)
- Mate Tsintsadze — Kukësi — 2020–21
- **Bachana Tskhadadze** – Flamurtari (2015)

== Germany ==
- Tim Brdarić — Vllaznia — 2020–21
- **Kilian Çuni** — **Dinamo City** — 2023–
- Gertian Durishti – Vllaznia (2006–2007)
- Ndriqim Halili – Kukësi (2015)
- Engjëll Hoti — Tirana, Partizani — 2021–23
- Steven Kodra — Laçi — 2020–21
- Vesel Limaj — Bylis, Kukësi, Tirana — 2017–23
- Christopher Mandiangu — Vllaznia — 2020–21
- Bajram Nebihi — Flamurtari — 2019–20
- Mërgim Neziri – Kamza (2017), Luftëtari — 2017–18, 2018–19
- Lutz Pfannenstiel – Vllaznia (2006–2007)
- Daniel Sengewald – Partizani (2006–2007)

== Ghana ==
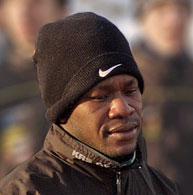
Seth Ablade became the first Ghanaian to play in Albania with Elbasani in 2003

- Seth Ablade — Elbasani — 2003–04
- **Reuben Acquah** – **Teuta** – 2021–
- Michael Agbekpornu – Egnatia – 2021–23
- **Abbey Agbodzie** — **Skënderbeu** — 2020–
- Benjamin Agyare — Apolonia — 2020–21
- Latif Amadu — Teuta — 2017–19
- Jakob Apuary – Egnatia (2004–2005)
- Samuel Armah — Skënderbeu — 2020–21
- Bernard Arthur — Apolonia — 2020–21
- Vincent Atinga — Tirana — 2018–19
- Charles Atsina — Vllaznia, Kastrioti — 2017–19
- Ngissah Bismark — Skënderbeu — 2021–22
- James Boadu – Vllaznia (2008–2009)
- Winful Cobbinah — Tirana — 2018–20
- Abu Danladi — Bylis — 2022–23
- Richard Danso — Tirana — 2020–22
- Dennis Dowouna — Skënderbeu — 2020–22
- Raphael Dwamena — Egnatia — 2022–24
- **Randy Dwumfour** — **Skënderbeu** — 2019–22, 2023–
- Caleb Ekuban — Partizani — 2016–17
- Joseph Ekuban — Partizani — 2019–20
- Emmanuel Essien — Skënderbeu — 2019–20
- Isaac Gyamfi — Tirana — 2020–22
- Edwin Gyasi — Kukësi — 2022–23
- Basit Abdul Khalid — Teuta — 2019–20
- **Alfred Mensah** — **Skënderbeu**, **Partizani** — 2019–
- Emmanuel Mensah — Laçi, Partizani — 2016–17, 2018–19
- Adamu Mohammed – Vllaznia (2008)
- Fredrick Opoku — Bylis — 2019–20
- **Jordan Opoku** – Dinamo Tirana (2011)
- Johnson Owusu — Kukësi — 2022–23
- Derrick Sasraku — Tirana — 2020–21
- Ibrahim Sulley — Tirana — 2020–21
- Kwasi Sibo — Skënderbeu — 2018–19
- Eric Warden — Luftëtari — 2018–19
- Kofi Yeboah — Apolonia — 2020–21

== Greece ==
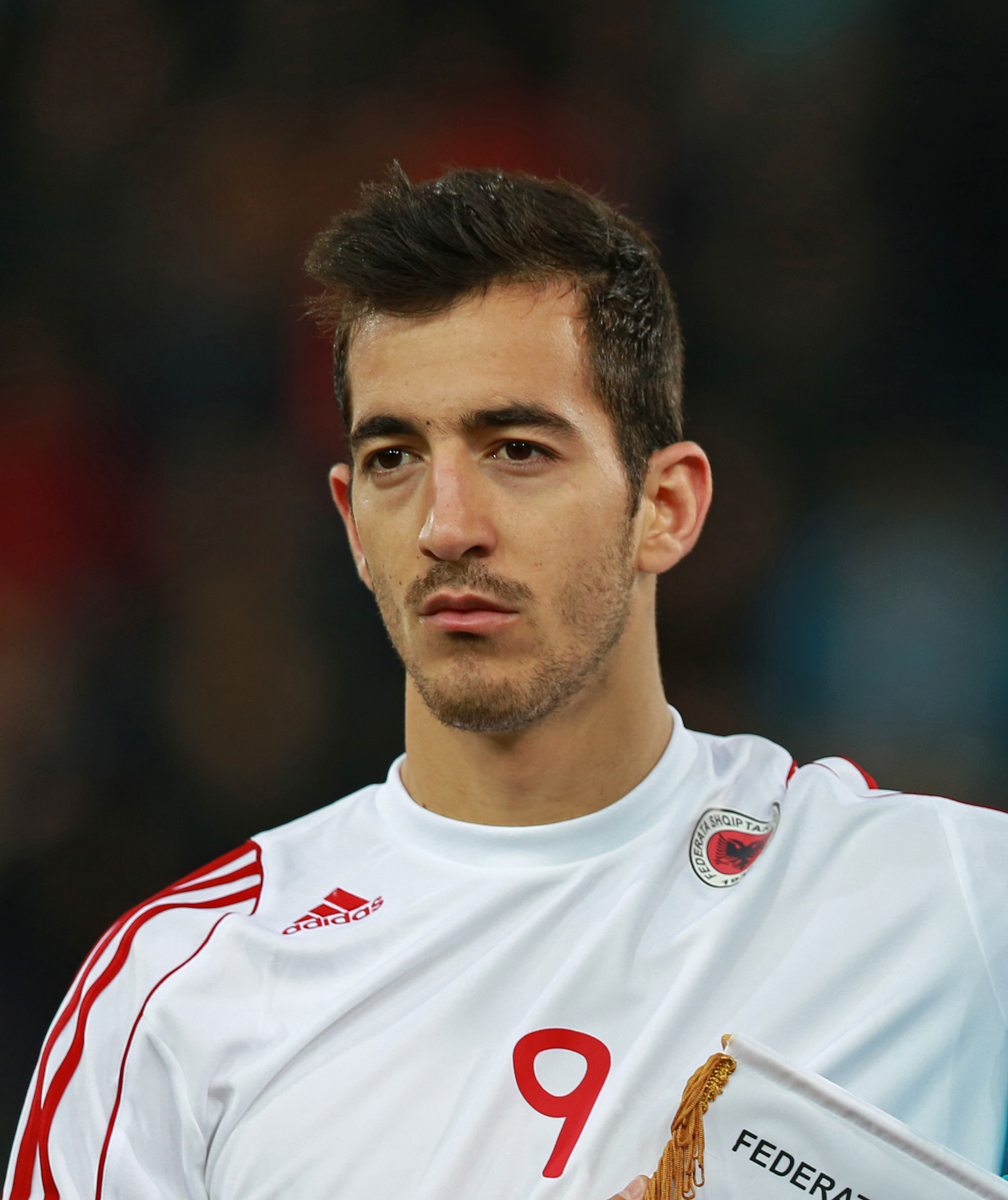
Born in Greece to Albanian parents, Vasil Shkurtaj has played for Luftëtari and Kukësi in the Kategoria Superiore

- Stefan Abara — Kukësi — 2023–24
- Donaldo Açka — Luftëtari — 2018–20
- Albi Alla — Bylis, Kukësi, Flamurtari, Laçi, **Teuta** — 2015–19, 2022–
- Dhimiter Andoni — Luftëtari — 2018–19
- **Fatjon Andoni** — **Dinamo City** — 2023–
- **Georgios Antoniadis** — **Skënderbeu** — 2021–
- Christos Athanasopoulos — Luftëtari — 2017–18
- Timis Bardis — Egnatia — 2021–22
- Aristotel Bella — Luftëtari — 2018–19
- **Donald Bogdani** — **Skënderbeu** — 2020–
- Romario Çekaj — Luftëtari — 2018–19
- Dionis Çikani — Partizani — 2020–21
- **Ajdi Dajko** — **Laçi** — 2023–
- Kostandino Dramolli — Skënderbeu, Bylis — 2013–16, 2019–21
- Devid Fejzulla — Dinamo Tirana, Teuta — 2021–23
- Apostol Furxhiu — Luftëtari — 2019–20
- Damian Gjini — Laçi — 2019–20
- **Andreas Gkertsos** — **Skënderbeu** — 2023–
- **Dejvid Janaqi** — **Skënderbeu** — 2023–
- **Stivian Janku** — Partizani, Luftëtari, Bylis, Egnatia, **Dinamo City**— 2016–2018, 2019–21, 2022–
- Antonis Karabinas — Luftëtari — 2019–20
- Dimitrios Kotsonis — Luftëtari — 2018–19
- Alexandros Kouros — Teuta — 2019–21, 2022–23
- Zani Kurti — Skënderbeu — 2018–19
- **Franko Lamce** — **Kukësi** — 2022–
- **Bruno Lulaj** — Skënderbeu, Laçi, Kukësi, **Tirana** — 2014–
- Flosard Malçi — Laçi, Bylis — 2019–20
- **Jorgo Meksi** — Skënderbeu, Kukësi, **Dinamo City** — 2019–
- Ilias Melkas — Luftëtari — 2018–19
- **Alesio Mija** — **Dinamo Tirana/City** — 2021–22, 2023–
- Christos Mingas — Luftëtari — 2017–18
- **Theodoros Mingos** — **Kukësi** — 2023–
- Bledi Muca — Luftëtari — 2019–20
- Panagiotis Paiteris — Luftëtari — 2019–20
- Paraskevas Prikas — Luftëtari — 2019–20
- **Harallamb Qaqi** — Partizani, Laçi, Kukësi, Kamza, Skënderbeu, **Teuta** — 2015–19, 2020–
- **Rezart Rama** — **Egnatia** — 2023–
- Andi Renja — Luftëtari — 2019–20
- **Kristian Rroku** — **Kukësi** — 2023–
- Simon Rrumbullaku — Kukësi — 2016–19
- Georgios Sarris — Flamurtari — 2019–20
- **Petros Silidhis** – **Egnatia** – 2021–
- Vasil Shkurtaj — Luftëtari, Kukësi, Laçi — 2017–20, 2021–23
- Renato Spahiu — Laçi, Bylis — 2019–20, 2020–21
- **Angelo Tafa** — **Kukësi** — 2020–
- Georgios Tampas — Skënderbeu — 2019–20
- Alexandros Tereziou — Skënderbeu — 2020–21
- Ardit Toli — Tirana — 2020–23
- **Kosta Vangjeli** — **Skënderbeu** — 2018–22, 2023–
- Aleksandro Zaimaj — Laçi — 2019–
- Renato Ziko — Skënderbeu, Laçi — 2018–19, 2021–23
- **Vasilis Zogos** —Bylis, **Kukësi** — 2019–20, 2022–

== Guinea ==
- Oumar Camara — Kukësi — 2019–20
- Sekou Camara — Flamurtari, Teuta — 2017–19
- Salim Cissé — Vllaznia — 2020–21
- **Lancinet Sidibe** — Flamurtari, Teuta, Tirana, **Dinamo Tirana** — 2017–20, 2021–
- Oumar Toure — Kukësi — 2018–19

== Guinea-Bissau ==
- Amido Baldé — Kukësi — 2017–18
- Idé Colubali — Teuta — 2019–20
- Inzaghi – Kukësi (2013)

== Hong Kong ==
- Remi Dujardin — Skënderbeu, Egnatia — 2020–22

== Hungary ==
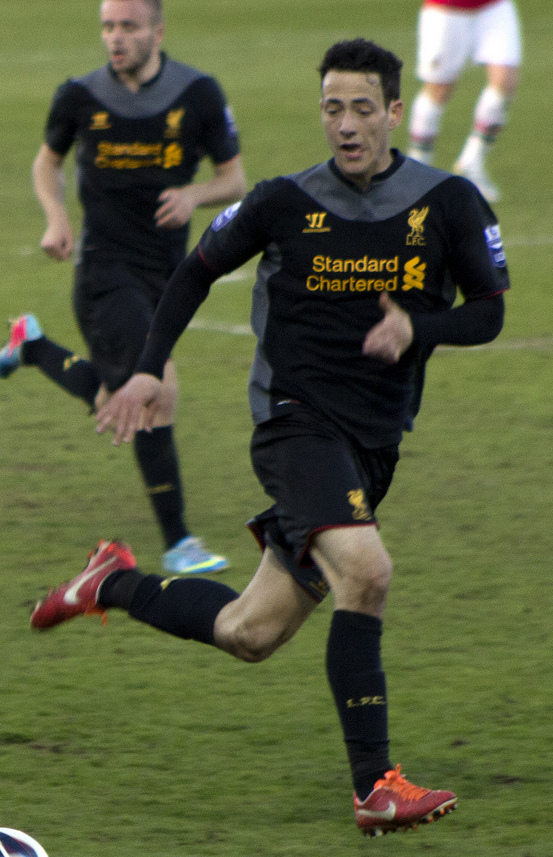
Krisztián Adorján played 9 games for Partizani during the 2017–18 Kategoria Superiore season

- Krisztián Adorján — Partizani — 2017–18
- Zoltán Cipf – Partizani (2001–2002)
- Zoltán Kenesei – Tirana (1999–2001), Partizani (2002)
- Mátyás Lázár – Tirana (1999–2000)
- Péter Sütöri – Tirana (1999–2000)
- **László Wukovics** – Tirana (1999–2000)

== Iran ==
- Nima Nakisa — Flamurtari — 1999–00
- Reza Karimi — Skënderbeu, Teuta — 2016–19

== Iraq ==
- **Yousuf Zetuna** — **Kastrioti** — 2021–

== Israel ==
- Ben Azubel – Partizani (2016)
- Siraj Nassar – Kukësi (2017)

== Italy ==
- Alessio Abibi — Tirana, Kastrioti — 2017–19, 2020–21
- **Alessandro Ahmetaj** — **Egnatia** — 2023–
- **Marco Alia** — **Skënderbeu** — 2023–
- Galip Arapi — Partizani — 2022–23
- Joseph Asante — Skënderbeu — 2021–22
- Luca Bertoni – Partizani (2016)
- Claudio Bonanni — Kamza — 2018–19
- Marvin Brozi — Partizani, Kukësi — 2017–19, 2022–24
- Gianmarco Campironi – Vllaznia (2014)
- Irlian Ceka — Laçi — 2018–20
- Michele Cima – Skënderbeu (2012)
- Mauro Cioffi – Vllaznia (2014)
- Godberg Cooper — Kukësi — 2019–21
- Catello D´Apice — Dinamo Tirana — 2004–05
- Giovanni La Camera – Partizani (2017–)
- Entonjo Elezaj — Kukësi — 2020–21
- Maurice Gomis — Kukësi — 2018–19
- Alessio Hyseni — Flamurtari, Partizani, Bylis — 2016–21
- **Alessandro Kacbufi** – Egnatia, **Erzeni** – 2021–
- **Luis Kacorri** — Bylis, **Dinamo City** — 2022–
- Redi Kasa — Egnatia — 2022–23
- Emanuele Morini – Partizani (2015)
- Luca Moscatiello – Teuta (2014)
- Cristiano Muzzachi – Tirana (2005–2006)
- **Edoardo Pesciallo** – **Egnatia** – 2021–
- Francesco Pigoni – Tirana (2012–2013)
- Matteo Prandelli – Kukësi (2013)
- Andrea Selvaggio – Partizani (2017–)
- Shaqir Tafa — Tirana — 2020–21

== Ivory Coast ==
- **Mory Bamba** — **Dinamo City** — 2023–
- **Jocelin Behiratche** — Tirana, **Dinamo City** — 2020–
- **Aboubacar Camara** — **Partizani** — 2021–

== Jamaica ==
- Brian Brown — Partizani — 2019–21
- **Jourdain Fletcher** — **Skënderbeu** — 2023–

== Japan ==
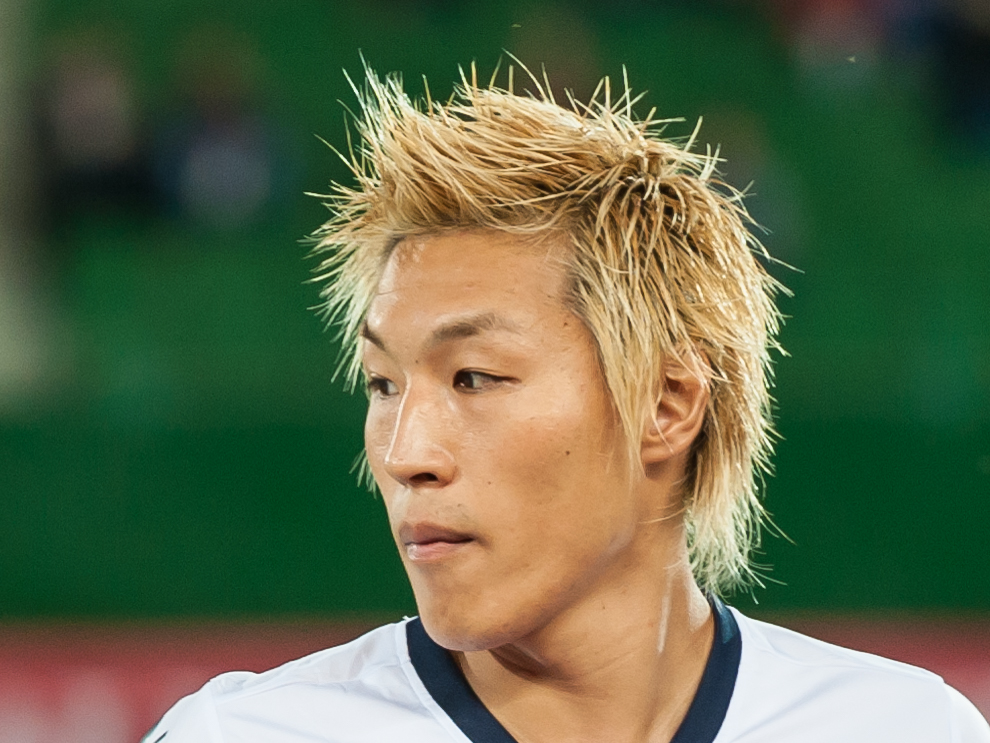
Masato Fukui became the first Japanese player in Albania in 2015, having since played for Tirana, Skënderbeu, Kukësi and Kamza

- Tomoyuki Doi — Bylis — 2022–23
- Masato Fukui — Tirana, Skënderbeu, Kukësi, Kamza — 2015–19
- Masaki Iinuma — Flamurtari — 2016–17

== Jordan ==
- Angelos Chanti — Luftëtari — 2019–20

== Kenya ==
- Moses Arita — Tirana — 2011–12
- Ismael Dunga — Luftëtari, Tirana, Vllaznia — 2018–21
- Francis Kahata — Tirana — 2013–15
- James Situma — Tirana — 2011–12

== Kosovo ==
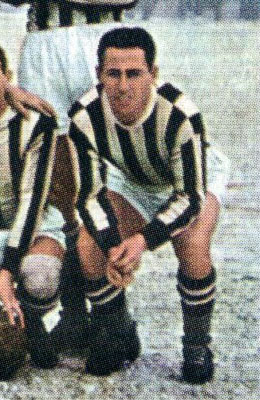
Riza Lushta scored 39 goals in 69 games and won 3 league titles with Tirana between 1934 and 1939

- Leonit Abazi — Skënderbeu — 2013–19
- **Mustafë Abdullahu** — **Tirana** — 2023–
- **Auron Ademi** — **Erzeni** — 2023–
- Berat Ahmeti – Vllaznia (2015–)
- Liridon Ahmeti – Besa (2007), Teuta (2007–2009), Shkumbini (2011), Partizani (2014)
- Malsor Ajeti — Skënderbeu — 2019–20
- Almir Ajzeraj — Skënderbeu — 2018–20
- **Festim Alidema** — **Erzeni** — 2023–
- Fidan Aliti – Skënderbeu 2017–19
- **Florent Avdyli** — **Teuta** — 2018–
- Ilir Avdyli — Tirana, Kamza, Kukësi – 2015–16, 2018–20
- Shpëtim Babaj – Besa, Elbasani (2005–2007, 2007–2008)
- Kreshnik Bahtiri — Kukësi — 2021–22
- Valon Bajgora – Besa (2006–2007)
- Flamur Bajrami – Tirana (2016–)
- Emin Baliqi – Besëlidhja, Elbasani (2007–2008, 2008)
- **Shkambi Baruti** — **Partizani** — 2022–
- Visar Bekaj — Tirana — 2020–23
- Albin Berisha — Laçi — 2018–19
- Arjan Berisha – Partizani (2005–2006)
- **Bernard Berisha** – Besa (2012–2014), Skënderbeu (2014–2015)
- **Ilir Berisha** – Flamurtari (2016)
- Elvis Bojaxhi – Kukësi (2014–)
- Rron Broja — Partizani — 2019–21
- **Altin Bytyçi** — Kukësi, Laçi, **Partizani** — 2016–19, 2020–
- Arbër Bytyqi — Laçi, Tirana — 2020–23
- **Debatik Curri** – Tirana (2014–2015), Flamurtari (2015–2016)
- Dardan Çerkini – Flamurtari (2016)
- Mirlind Daku — Kukësi — 2019–20
- Armend Dallku – Besa (2004–2005)
- David Domgjoni — Tirana, Kastrioti, Laçi — 2014–20
- Lulzim Doshlaku – Bylis (2014)
- **Alban Dragusha** – Besa (2006–2008; 2009–2010), Skënderbeu (2011)
- Astrit Fazliu – Partizani (2014–2016), Flamurtari (2016–2017)
- Ruhan Foniqi – Bylis (2013–2014)
- Dren Gashi – Egnatia – 2021–22
- Fisnik Gashi – Besa, Elbasani (2003–2005, 2006)
- Roni Gashi — Teuta — 2018–20
- Allush Gavazaj – Tirana (2014–), Tërbuni (2015–2016)
- Zenel Gavazaj — Skënderbeu, Kukësi — 2018–19, 2020–22
- Drin Govori — Skënderbeu — 2020–21
- Eros Grezda — Partizani — 2023–24
- Betim Halimi — Kukësi — 2022–23
- Adnand Haliti – Partizani, Teuta (2005–2006, 2006–2007)
- Ahmet Haliti – Besa (2014), Bylis (2015–2016)
- Fitim Haliti – Besa (2008–2011)
- Florent Hasani — Tirana — 2022–24
- Burim Hashani – Teuta (2007–2008)
- Erdin Hashani – Besa, Besëlidhja (2006–2007, 2007–2008)
- Adnan Haxhaj — Vllaznia — 2015–16
- Yll Hoxha — Kukësi, Flamurtari, Vllaznia — 2012–17
- Berat Hyseni – Tirana (2007–2008)
- Labinot Ibrahimi — Partizani — 2013–19
- Bujar Idrizi — Kukësi — 2017–18
- Dritan Islamaj – Besa (2005–2006)
- **Redon Ismaili** — **Partizani** — 2023–
- Ahmed Januzi – Besa (2006)
- Bajram Jashanica — Skënderbeu, Besa — 2013–20
- Armend Kastrati – Bylis (2014)
- Shend Kelmendi — Skënderbeu — 2017–18
- Sokol Kiqina — **Erzeni** — 2022–24
- Besnik Krasniqi – Besa (2009–2011), Partizani (2013–2014), Teuta (2014), Flamurtari (2016–)
- **Blend Krasniqi** — **Dinamo City** — 2023–
- Dritan Krasniqi – Besa (2004–2011)
- Festim Krasniqi – Partizani (2016)
- **Altin Kryeziu** — **Laçi** — 2023–
- Viktor Kuka – Teuta (2015)
- Flamur Kyçyku – Flarmurtari (2006–2008)
- **Liridon Latifi** — Skënderbeu, Vllaznia, **Tirana** — 2014–17, 2021–
- Mensur Limani — Tirana — 2012–14
- Lapidar Lladrovci — Kukësi — 2015–16
- **Luan Lleshi** — **Erzeni**, Tirana — 2022–
- Riza Lushta — Tirana — 1934–39
- Kreshnik Lushtaku — Vllaznia — 2015–16
- Kushtrim Lushtaku — Kukësi, Flamurtari — 2014–17
- **Esat Mala** — **Partizani** — 2019–
- Argjend Malaj — Tirana, Skënderbeu, Kamza — 2014–19
- **Behar Maliqi** – Partizani (2013–2014)
- **Bekim Maliqi** — **Erzeni** — 2023–
- Faton Maloku — Kukësi — 2018–19
- Lorik Maxhuni – Flamurtari (2015–)
- Mentor Mazrekaj — Partizani, **Laçi** — 2013–17, 2020–23
- **Adnard Mehmeti** — Erzeni, **Partizani** — 2023–
- Lirim Mema — Flamurtari — 2019–20
- **Shkodran Metaj** – Flamurtari (2014–2015)
- Xhelal Miroçi – Vllaznia (2006–2007)
- Arbnor Muja — Skënderbeu — 2019–21
- Premton Muja – Elbasani (2006–2007)
- Ismet Munishi – Flarmurtari, Laçi, Besa – 1995–1996, 2003–2004, 2005, 2005–2007
- Kushtrim Munishi – Partizani (1995–1997)
- Drilon Musaj – Laçi (2015–2017)
- **Kushtrim Mushica** – Bylis (2015)
- Besar Musolli — Kukësi — 2012–20
- Argjend Mustafa – Skënderbeu (2016–)
- Argjend Mustafa — Besa, Partizani, Laçi, Tirana, Flamurtari — 2012–20
- Ilir Nallbani – Elbasani (2006–2008), Vllaznia (2008–2013)
- Kreshnik Nebihiu — Flamurtari, Bylis — 2019–20, 2020–21
- **Dijar Nikqi** — **Tirana**, Teuta — 2021–
- Adis Nurković — Flamurtari — 2017–18
- Leutrim Pajaziti – Teuta (2012–2013)
- Fisnik Papuqi – Elbasani (2006–2008)
- Avni Pepa – Flamurtari (2015)
- Arsim Plepolli – Elbasani (2007–2008)
- Jeton Qerimi – Teuta (2005–2006)
- Fisnik Ramadanaj – Besa (2013–2014)
- Ylber Ramadani – Partizani (2016–2017)
- **Ermir Rashica** — **Skënderbeu** — 2023–
- Valdrin Rashica – Skënderbeu (2016), Teuta (2016–2017)
- Alban Rexhepi – Laçi (2015)
- **Amir Rrahmani** – Partizani (2013–2015)
- **Leard Sadriu** — **Skënderbeu** — 2020–
- Blerim Sahitaj — Kukësi — 2023–24
- Samir Sahiti – Skënderbeu (2014), Bylis (2016)
- Suad Sahiti — Skënderbeu — 2017–18
- Hajdin Salihu – Laçi – 2021–22
- Florent Sejdiu – Skënderbeu (2014)
- Alban Shabani — Skënderbeu — 2020–21
- Bujar Shabani – Skënderbeu (2015)
- Veton Shabani – Korabi (2017)
- Xhevdet Shabani – Teuta (2014)
- Sedat Shahini – Teuta (2005–2006)
- **Arb Shala** — **Dinamo Tirana** — 2021–
- Arbër Shala — Laçi, Kamza — 2016–19
- Alban Shillova – Bylis (2014)
- Meriton Spahiu – Lushnja (2005–2006)
- Rron Statovci — Partizani — 2018–19
- Erkan Sulejmani – Vllaznia (2007–2008), Kastrioti (2005–2006)
- **Ardit Tahiri** — **Dinamo City** — 2023–
- **Gjelbrim Taipi** — Kukësi, **Partizani** — 2020–
- **Faton Toski** – Laçi (2016)
- **Veton Tusha** — **Dinamo City** — 2023–
- Mendurim Ulluri – Teuta (2014)
- **Leonat Vitija** — **Skënderbeu** — 2019–
- Ymer Xhaferri – Besa (2005–2006)
- **Arbenit Xhemajli** – **Egnatia** – 2023–
- **Baton Zabergja** — **Dinamo City** — 2023–
- **Agim Zeka** — Skënderbeu, **Erzeni** — 2015–17, 2023–
- **Leart Zekolli** — **Partizani** — 2022–
- **Melos Zenunaj** — **Kukësi** — 2023–

== Latvia ==
- Romans Bezzubovs — Bylis — 2010–11
- Eduards Emsis — Egnatia — 2022–23
- Artūrs Silagailis — Tirana — 2010–11

== Lebanon ==
- Mohammad Kdouh — Vllaznia — 2015–16

== Liberia ==
- Abel Gebor — Tërbuni — 2015–16
- Van-Dave Harmon — Laçi — 2020–22

== Lithuania ==
- Rolandas Baravykas — Kukësi — 2020–21
- **Juozas Lubas** — **Egnatia** — 2023–
- Gytis Paulauskas — Egnatia — 2023–24

== Mali ==
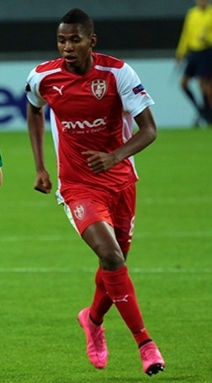
Bakary Nimaga played 97 times and scored 5 goals in the league with Skënderbeu between 2013 and 2018

- **Moctar Cissé** – Tirana (2016–2017)
- Saliou Guindo — Skënderbeu, Bylis, Laçi — 2018–20, 2021–23
- Ibrahima Kone – Dinamo Tirana (2005–2006)
- Bakary Nimaga — Skënderbeu — (2012–18
- Ali Samake — Dinamo Tirana/City — 2021–22, 2023–24
- Djibril Sissoko – Lushnja (2004-2006), Flamurtari (2006–2007), Lushnja (2008–2009)
- Abdoulaye Toungara — Flamurtari — 2017–19
- Abdulla Traoré – Kastrioti (2007–2008)

== Martinique ==
- Bédi Buval – Flamurtari (2015)

== Mauritania ==
- **Mohamed Lemine Dah** – **Egnatia** – 2023–
- Abdou El Id — Kukësi — 2022–24
- Mohamed Hamrud — Tirana — 2001–02

== Mexico ==
- David Izazola — Kamza — 2018–19
- Jorge Oropeza — Flamurtari — 2007–08

== Moldova ==
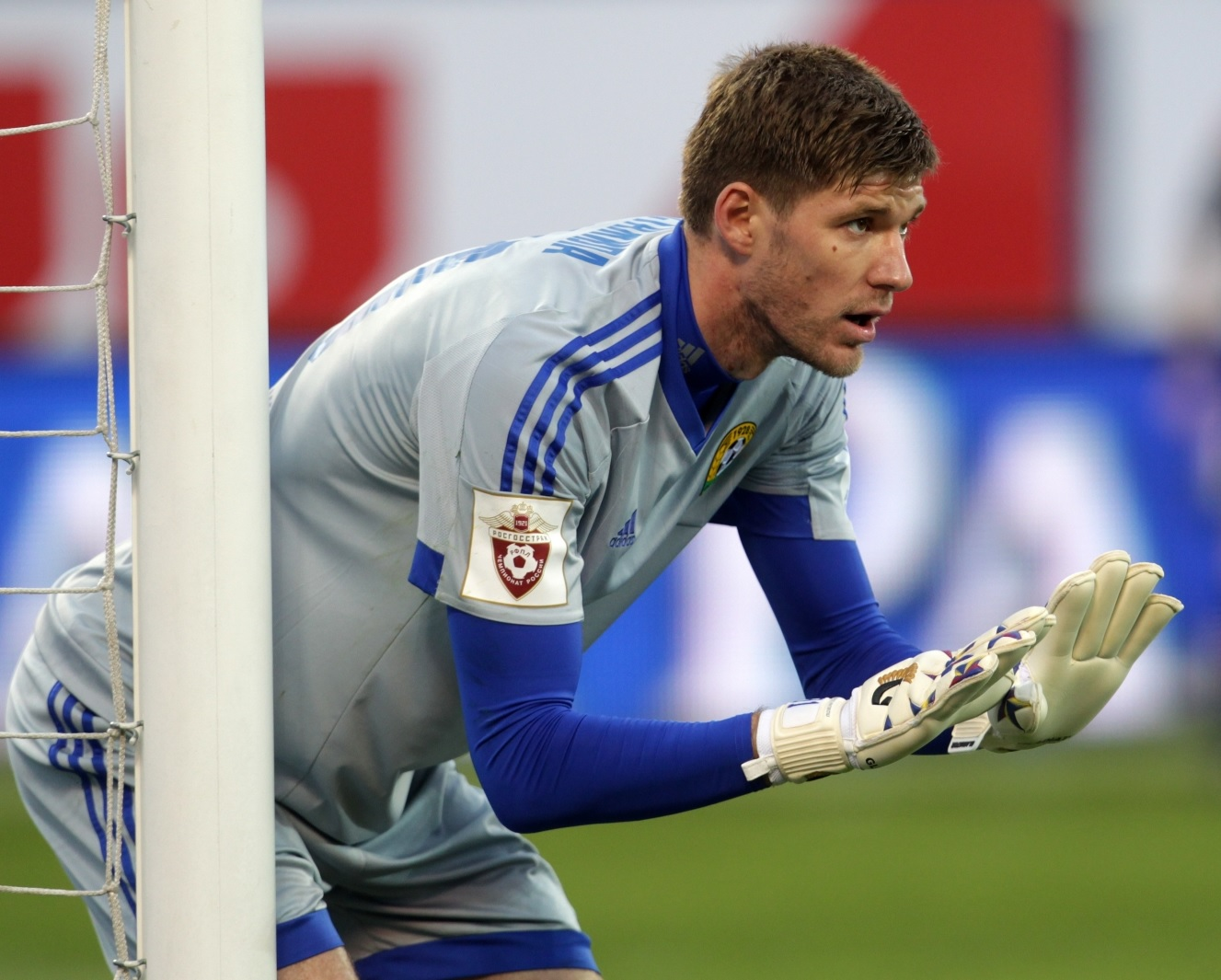
Dmitri Stajila was the first Moldovan to play for an Albanian club

- Maxim Cojocaru — Vllaznia — 2019–20
- Artiom Puntus — Kukësi — 2021–22
- Eugen Sidorenco — Vllaznia — 2019–20
- **Nicolai Solodovnicov** — **Kukësi** — 2023–
- Dmitri Stajila — Kukësi, Laçi — 2014–15, 2019–20

== Montenegro ==
- Jasmin Agović — Vllaznia — 2016–17
- Savo Barać – Vllaznia (2001–2003)
- Aleksandar Bezmarević – Teuta (2014)
- Drago Bumbar — Apolonia — 2020–21
- Darko Bulatović — Vllaznia — 2021–23
- Valjento Camaj – Vllaznia (2000–2001)
- Stefan Cicmil — Vllaznia — 2015–17
- **Marko Ćetković** – Laçi (2014–2016), Partizani (2017)
- Igor Ćuković — Kamza — 2017–19
- **Ivan Delić** – Vllaznia (2012–2013), Tirana (2014)
- Andrija Dragojević — Vllaznia — 2015–16
- Jovan Drobnjak – Partizani (2005), Vllaznia (2006)
- Đorđe Đikanović – Kukësi (2015)
- Enis Đoković – Vllaznia (2011–2013)
- Hasim Đoković – Vllaznia (2000–2001, 2002–2003)
- Simo Goranović – Besa (2013)
- Branimir Ivanišević – Dinamo Tirana (2005–2007)
- Miloš Kalezić — Vllaznia — 2020–21
- Aleksandar Kovač – Teuta (2005–2007)
- Alija Krnić — Kukësi — 2021–22
- Miloš Marković – Skënderbeu (2012–2013)
- Dražen Milić – Vllaznia (2006–2007)
- Darko Nikač — Teuta — 2019–20
- Baćo Nikolić – Flamurtari (2015)
- Jovan Nikolić – Partizani (2015)
- Stefan Nikolić — Partizani — 2018–19
- Darko Pavićević – Vllaznia (2015)
- Ranko Radonjić – Vllaznia (2005)
- Balša Radović — Flamurtari, Luftëtari — 2016–17, 2018–19
- Blažo Rajović – Vllaznia (2009–2011, 2013–2014), Flamurtari (2011–2013), Laçi (2017)
- Igor Radusinović – Vllaznia (2005–2007)
- Marko Roganović – Laçi – 2021–23
- Ognjen Rolović — Kamza — 2018–19
- Adrijan Rudović – Tërbuni (2015–2016)
- Ronaldo Rudović – Vllaznia (2016–)
- Marko Šćepanović – Kukësi (2016)
- **Aleksandar Šofranac** — **Dinamo Tirana** — 2021–
- Idriz Toskić — Skënderbeu — 2018–19
- Marko Vidović – Partizani (2015–2016)
- Miroslav Vujadinović – Vllaznia (2010–2014), Laçi (2014–2016), Korabi (2016–2017)
- Goran Vujović – Skënderbeu (2017)
- **Nikola Vukčević** – Vllaznia (2006–2007, 2014)
- Kristijan Vulaj — Vllaznia — 2022–23
- **Dejan Zarubica** – **Laçi** – 2021–
- Miodrag Zec – Tirana (2012)
- Bojan Zogović — Vllaznia — 2020–23

== Morocco ==
- Omar Gasnayt – Lushnja (2004–2005)
- **Younes Bnou Marzouk** — **Egnatia** — 2023–
- Muhamet Zadrah – Lushnja (2004–2005)

== Mozambique ==
- **Faisal Bangal** – Teuta (2016–2017)
- **Ussama Mutumane** – Luftëtari (2017–)
- **Reginaldo** — Luftëtari, Laçi, Kukësi, **Dinamo Tirana** — 2016–19, 2021–

== Netherlands ==
- Cerezo Hilgen – Luftëtari — 2019–20
- **Agan Mjaki** — **Laçi** — 2023–
- Fabian Shahaj — Partizani — 2022–23
- Arsenio Valpoort – Teuta, Egnatia – 2021–22
- Jan Veenhof – Tirana — 2002–03
- Angelmo Vyent – Luftëtari — 2019–20

== Nigeria ==
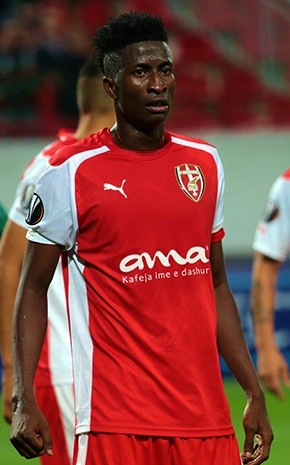
Peter Olayinka won the 2014–15 Kategoria Superiore title with Skënderbeu

- Sulaimon Adekunle – Apolonia (2012–2015), Bylis (2015)
- Abraham Adelaja – Korabi (2016–2017)
- James Adeniyi — Bylis, Tomori, Laçi, Skënderbeu — 2012–18
- Ismail Gata Adeshina – Kukësi (2014)
- Rasak Ridwan Adeshina – Skënderbeu (2016–)
- Adebayo Adigun – Bylis (2012–2013)
- Ovbokha Agboyi – Elbasani (2014–2015)
- Nnamdi Ahanonu — Skënderbeu — 2023–24
- **Samuel Ajine** — **Skënderbeu** — 2023–
- Adeleke Akinyemi — Skënderbeu, Laçi — 2015–16, 2021–23
- Abraham Alechenwu – Elbasani (2005–2006), Tirana (2006–2010), Dinamo Tirana (2007–2008), Vllaznia (2011), Flamurtari (2011–2012), Besa (2012–2013), Kastrioti (2013–2014), Laçi (2016–)
- Morrise Anayo – Apolonia (2012–2013)
- **Beji Anthony** — **Bylis** — 2019–
- **Sodiq Atanda** — Apolonia, Partizani, Egnatia, **Erzeni** — 2012–13, 2014–2019, 2022–
- Prince Guy Ativie – Partizani (2002–2003)
- Charles Atshimene — Bylis — 2022–23
- Gabriel Awia – Skënderbeu (2005–2006), Kastrioti (2006–2007), Apolonia (2007)
- **James Ayinde** — **Egnatia** — 2022–
- Michael Babatunde – Laçi – 2022–23
- Eko Barine – Skënderbeu (2016–), Teuta (2017)
- Olalekan Bola – Bylis (2012–2013)
- Mathew Boniface – Partizani (2017)
- **Stephen Chinedu** — **Dinamo Tirana** — 2021–
- Geoffrey Chinedu Charles – Skënderbeu (2016–)
- Medu Dixon – Egnatia (2004–2005)
- John Eboh – Lushnja (2005–2006)
- Kufre Ebong – Kukësi (2017–)
- **Ifeanyi Edeh** – Tirana (2016–)
- **Ndubuisi Egbo** – Tirana (2001–2004), Bylis (2008–2009)
- Mesheli Eimen – Tirana (2001–2002)
- Christopher Omoseibi Elijah – Bylis (2013)
- Henry Emenalo – Apolonia (2006–2007)
- Patrick Friday Eze — Kukësi — 2020–21
- Emanuel Ezeriaha – Besa (2005–2006)
- Collins Eziamaka – Vllaznia (2018–2019)
- **Mustapha Gbolahan** — **Kukësi** — 2023–
- Aondongu John Huan – Bylis (2012–2013)
- Lukman Hussein — Kastrioti, Tirana — 2018–19, 2020–23
- Michael Ebere Ikpe – Bylis (2013–2014)
- Abdullahi Ishaka – Besa (2003–2004), Shkumbini (2004–2005), Besa (2005–2006), Partizani (2006), Elbasani (2006–2007), Besa (2007–2008)
- Solomonson Izuchukwuka – Bylis (2011–2013, 2016), Kukësi (2014)
- Otto John — Skënderbeu — 2018–20
- **Ikechukwu Kalu** – Teuta (2014)
- Paul Komolafe — Erzeni — 2023–24
- Qudus Lawal — Bylis — 2020–21
- **Christian Mba** — **Partizani** — 2022–
- **Daniel Momoh** — **Kukësi** — 2022–
- Tochukwu Nabukwane – Shkumbini (2005–2006), Vllaznia (2005–2006), Besëlidhja (2007–2008)
- Leonardo Ineh Nosa – Lushnja (1996–1997)
- **Odirah Ntephe** — **Bylis** — 2019–
- Erhun Obanor — Kukësi, Laçi — 2019–21
- **Nnamdi Oduamadi** – Tirana (2018–2019)
- Charles Ofoyen – Apolonia (2006–2011), Tomori (2012–2013), Laçi (2013–2014)
- Ambrose Ohadero – Lushnja (2005–2006)
- Hamzat Ojediran – Egnatia – 2022–23
- **Henry Okebugwu** — Partizani, **Kastrioti** — 2018–19, 2020–
- Martins Okeke – Apolonia (2001–2003)
- Anthony Okpotu — Laçi — 2018–19
- **Samuel Okunowo** – Tirana (2004–2005)
- Emejuru Okwudili – Shkumbini (2007–2008)
- Samuel Olabisi – Kukësi (2014)
- Oshobe Oladele – Partizani (2013–2014)
- Peter Taiye Oladotun – Kamza (2011)
- Joseph Olatunji – Skënderbeu (2011)
- Peter Olayinka – Bylis (2012–2013), Skënderbeu (2014–2015)
- Sunday Ominiu – Partizani (2002–2003)
- **Olawale Onanuga** — **Kastrioti** — 2021–
- Valentin Onieka – Shkumbini (2005–2006)
- Ebus Onuchukwu – Apolonia (2005–2006)
- Benjamin Onwuachi – Tirana (2007–2008)
- Nurudeen Orelesi — Dinamo Tirana, Skënderbeu, Kamza — 2010–14, 2015–19
- James Osusi – Laçi (2004–2005), Skënderbeu (2005–2006), Kastrioti (2006–2009)
- Kehinde Owoeye – Bylis (2012–2013), Tomori (2013), Laçi (2014), Kastrioti (2014–2015)
- **Mario Rabiu** — **Skënderbeu** — 2023–
- **Uche Sabastine** — **Skënderbeu** — 2023–
- Theophilus Solomon — Partizani — 2019–21
- **Peter Suswam** – Kukësi (2014)
- Gilbert Omatseyin Thompson – Apolonia (2014)
- **Henry Uche** – Kukësi (2014)
- Charles Udeke – Kastrioti (2007–2008)
- Felix Udoh – Partizani (2013–2014)
- Alma Wakili — Partizani — 2018–19

== North Korea ==
- So Hyon-uk — Partizani — 2018–19

== North Macedonia ==
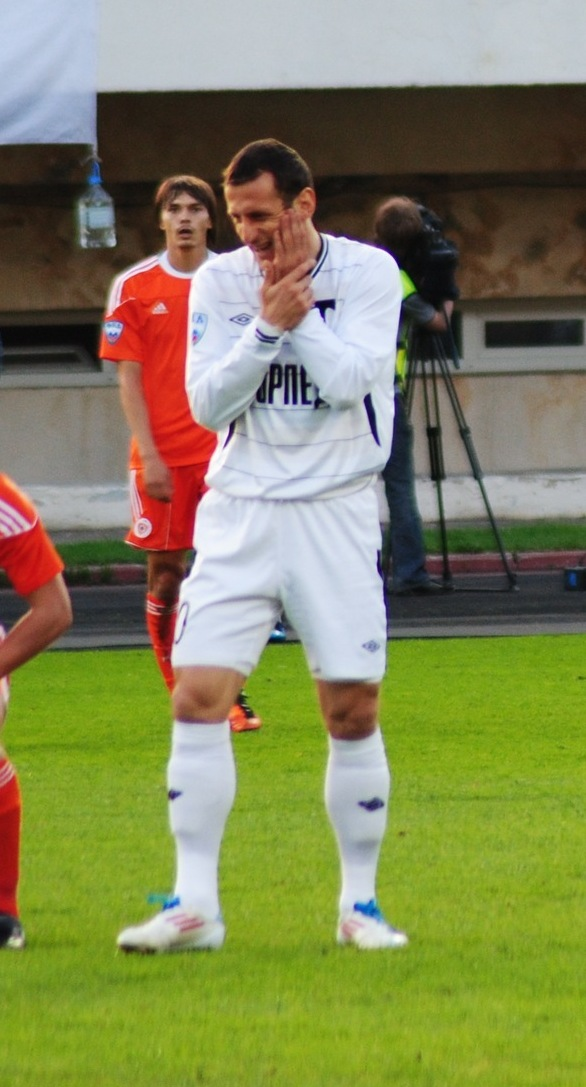
Artim Položani has played for Apolonia, Dinamo Tirana, Partizani, Flamurtari and Skënderbeu in the Kategoria Superiore

- Besart Abdurahimi — Partizani — 2017–18
- Ilirid Ademi – Laçi, Egnatia, Erzeni – 2021–23
- Mevlan Adili — Vllaznia, Bylis — 2019–23
- Eftim Aksentiev – Skënderbeu (2010)
- **Ramin Alii** — **Skënderbeu** — 2021–22, 2023–
- Marjan Altiparmakovski — Laçi — 2018–19
- Bashkim Arifi – Elbasani (2002–2003)
- Jasir Asani — Partizani — 2017–21
- **Xhelil Asani** — **Erzeni**, Vllaznia — 2022–
- **David Atanaskoski** — **Partizani** — 2022–
- Erogen Brajković–Vaso – Erzeni (2001–2003), Vllaznia (2003–2005)
- Elvis Bajrami – Apolonia (2006–2007)
- **Egzon Belica** — **Partizani** — 2018–
- Jakup Berisha — Kukësi — 2022–23
- Sedat Berisha — Vllaznia, Tirana — 2017–19
- Amir Bilali — Bylis, Teuta, Partizani — 2015–16, 2017–18, 2019–20
- Sabit Bilali — Partizani — 2022–24
- **Ilčo Borov** – Apolonia (2001–2002)
- Bobi Celeski — Teuta — 2018–22
- Konstantin Cheshmedjiev — Vllaznia — 2023–24
- Ardian Cuculi — Partizani, Kukësi — 2014–15, 2018–19
- Aleksandar Damchevski — Partizani, Bylis — 2021–23
- Cvete Delioski – Apolonia (2006–2008), Shkumbini (2008–2009)
- **Besir Demiri** — Kukësi, **Dinamo Tirana** — 2020–
- **Ertan Demiri** – Partizani (2013–2014)
- Milan Dimitrievski – Dinamo Tirana (2005–2006)
- **Dejan Dimitrovski** – Besëlidhja (2007–2008)
- Kirče Dimovski – Apolonia (2006–2007)
- Darko Dodev — Vllaznia — 2023–24
- Hristijan Dragarski – Teuta – 2021–22
- **Filip Duranski** – **Egnatia** – 2021–
- Andreja Efremov — Vllaznia — 2019–20
- **Muzafer Ejupi** – Skënderbeu (2013)
- Agon Elezi — Skënderbeu — 2019–20
- Valon Ethemi — Kukësi — 2017–20
- Besnik Ferati — Partizani — 2019–21
- Imran Fetai — Apolonia — 2020–21
- Argjent Gafuri — Flamurtari — 2017–18
- **Gilson** – Besëlidhja (2008)
- Sašo Gjoreski – Tirana (2007–2008)
- Bojan Gjorgievski — Teuta — 2017–19
- **Fahrudin Gjurgjevikj** — **Vllaznia** — 2021–
- Filip Gligorov — Vllaznia, Partizani, Kukësi — 2019–20, 2021–22
- Pepi Gorgiev – Teuta – 2021–22
- Bujar Hajdari — Vllaznia — 2023–24
- Ferhan Hasani — Partizani — 2020–21
- Simeon Hristov — Vllaznia — 2019–20
- **Agim Ibraimi** — Kukësi, **Dinamo Tirana** — 2020–
- Mensur Idrizi – Elbasani (2010), Skënderbeu (2011), Pogradeci (2012)
- Antonio Ilieski — Kukësi — 2022–23
- Riste Ilijovski — Luftëtari — 2018–19
- Ardit Iljazi — Erzeni, Teuta — 2022–24
- **Demir Imeri** — Kamza, Vllaznia, **Egnatia** — 2017–18, 2020–
- **Aleksandar Isaevski** — Vllaznia, **Dinamo Tirana** — 2020–
- Besar Iseni – Egnatia – 2021–22
- Besir Iseni – Tirana – 2022–23
- Aleksandar Jakimovski – Apolonia (2007), Shkumbini (2007–2008)
- Armend Jusufi – Besëlidhja (2007–2008)
- Fatjon Jusufi — Partizani — 2018–19
- **Florian Kadriu** — Tirana, Teuta, **Erzeni** — 2015–16, 2022–
- **Dimitar Kapinkovski** – Bylis (2009)
- Riste Karakamisev — Bylis — 2022–23
- **Nikola Karčev** – Elbasani (2007, 2008–2010)
- Tome Kitanovski — Kukësi — 2019–20
- Pece Korunovski – Tirana (2009–2010)
- Dejan Kostevski – Besëlidhja (2007–2008)
- **Besart Krivanjeva** – **Egnatia** – 2021–
- **Vlade Lazarevski** – Flamurtari (2013)
- **Nijaz Lena** – Flamurtari (2010–2015), Teuta (2016), Kukësi (2016–)
- **Edis Maliqi** — Kukësi, **Dinamo Tirana** — 2018–20, 2021–
- **Toni Meglenski** – Elbasani (2008, 2009–2010)
- Raif Mircelovski – Bylis (2008–2009)
- Muarem Muarem — Flamurtari — 2017–18
- **Suhejlj Muharem** — **Skënderbeu** — 2023–
- Mevlan Murati – Partizani (2014–2015)
- Burhan Mustafov — Teuta — 2017–18
- Valmir Nafiu – Skënderbeu (2016)
- Bojan Najdenov — Laçi — 2018–19
- **Filip Najdovski** — **Tirana** — 2020–
- Kliment Nastoski – Pogradeci (2011), Shkumbini (2012)
- **Nderim Nexhipi** – Partizani (2014–2015), Flamurtari (2015), Korabi (2016)
- **Arbën Nuhiji** – Besa (2006–2007), Elbasani (2008)
- **Ardijan Nuhiji** – Dinamo Tirana (2006–2007), Elbasani (2007–2008)
- Borjan Pančevski — Bylis — 2020–21
- Dragan Pernjačevski – Besëlidhja (2007–2008)
- Ilče Petrovski – Pogradeci (2011–2012), Kastrioti (2013)
- Artim Položani — Apolonia, Dinamo Tirana, Partizani, Flamurtari, Skënderbeu — 2000–04, 2007–08, 2017–20
- Aleksandar Popovski – Apolonia (2008)
- Emran Ramadani — Partizani — 2017–18
- **Zekirija Ramadan** – Besa (2007–2008)
- **Bekim Redjepi** — Skënderbeu, Partizani, **Dinamo City** — 2020–
- Aleksandar Ristevski — Vllaznia — 2019–20
- **Kire Ristevski** – Elbasani (2010), Bylis (2011–2013), Tirana (2015)
- Borče Ristovski – Skënderbeu (2010)
- Panče Ristovski – Apolonia (2006–2007)
- Ersen Sali – Partizani (2014)
- Taulant Seferi — Tirana, Teuta — 2020–23
- Remzifaik Selmani — Partizani — 2022–23
- Bunjamin Shabani – Partizani (2014–2015)
- **Artim Shaqiri** – Besa (2007–2008)
- **Goran Siljanovski** — Flamurtari, **Dinamo Tirana** — 2017–19, 2021–
- **Igor Stojanov** – Elbasani (2006)
- Ilčo Stojčevski – Besëlidhja (2007–2008)
- **Aco Stojkov** – Skënderbeu (2015)
- Alban Sulejmani — Partizani — 2017–18
- Flamur Tairi – Teuta (2010–2013), Bylis (2015–2016)
- Ilčo Tasev – Besëlidhja (2007–2008)
- **Blagoja Todorovski** — **Teuta** — 2019–
- Aleksander Tolevski – Besëlidhja (2007–2008)
- Kristijan Toshevski — Tirana — 2020–23
- Ennur Totre — Tirana — 2021–23
- **Yani Urdinov** – Flamurtari (2015)
- Muhamed Useini — Flamurtari — 2017–19
- **Bashkim Velija** – **Laçi** – 2021–
- Bilal Velija – Besa (2008–2009)
- Viktor Velkoski – Laçi – 2021–23
- Suat Zendeli – Dinamo Tirana (2002–2003, 2005–2006), Apolonia (2006–2007), Besa (2007–2009)
- Fisnik Zuka — Flamurtari — 2017–18

== Norway ==
- Loti Celina — Partizani, Egnatia — 2020–22, 2023–

== Palestine ==
- Mohammad Al-Kayed — Skënderbeu — 2017–19

== Paraguay ==
- Santiago Martinez – Vllaznia (2015)
- Ángel Orué – Skënderbeu (2016)

== Peru ==
- **Sebastián La Torre** — **Kukësi** — 2023–
- Juan Carlos Mariño – Dinamo Tirana (2005–2006)
- Carlos Rivas — Kukësi — 2023–24

== Poland ==
- Ariel Borysiuk – Laçi – 2022–23
- Przemysław Norko – Partizani – 2005–06

== Portugal ==
- Tiago Ferreira — Kukësi — 2022–23
- Pedro Neves – Bylis (2008–2009)
- Fernando Pina – Skënderbeu (2007–2008)
- Ruben Silva — Kastrioti — 2021–22

== Romania ==
- Lucian Bica – Dinamo Tirana (2002–2003), Lushnja (2003–2005)
- Deian Boldor — Partizani — 2019–20
- Gheorghe Cornea – Lushnja (2003–2004)
- Christian Dragoi – Kastrioti (2012), Vllaznia (2012–2013), Kukësi (2013)
- Adrian John Ene – Lushnja (2003–2004)
- Dan Ignat – Vllaznia (2018–2019)
- Cornel Predescu – Skënderbeu (2017)
- Cristian Sîrghi — Flamurtari — 2018–19

== Russia ==
- Vladimir Esin — Luftëtari — 2018–19
- Khasan Khatsukov — Kamza — 2017–19
- Dmitri Simonov — Kamza — 2017–19

== Rwanda ==
- **Lewis Aniweta** – Skënderbeu (2005)
- **Meddie Kagere** – Tirana (2014)

== Senegal ==
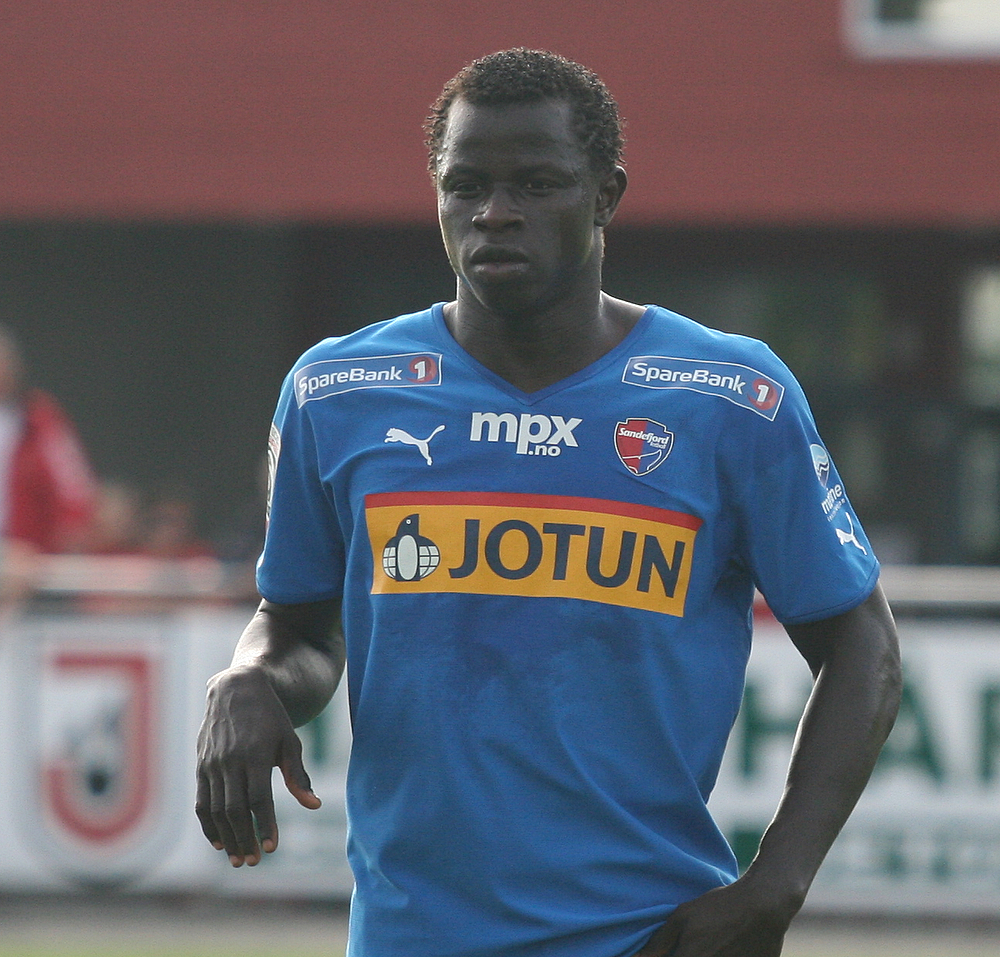
Malick Mané played 13 games for Laçi 2018–19 season

- Timothe Benisson – Besa (2005–2006)
- Amadou Boiro — Laçi — 2017–18
- **Fallou Diagne** — **Vllaznia** — 2021–
- Abdoulaye Diop – Egnatia (2004–2005)
- Albaye Papa Diop – Dinamo Tirana, Shkumbini — 2005–10, 2011–12
- Ismaila Diop — Apolonia — 2020–21
- Moctar Fall – Teuta (2014)
- **Pape Niokhor Fall** – Dinamo Tirana (2005–2006)
- Baptiste Faye – Luftëtari (2016)
- El Hadji Gaye – Dinamo Tirana (2004–2005)
- Masseye Gaye – Dinamo Tirana (2005–2006)
- **Bakary Goudiaby** — **Dinamo City** — 2023–
- El Hadji Goudjabi – Dinamo Tirana, Vllaznia, Skënderbeu (2005–2008)
- Nuke Gutenberg – Partizani (2004–2005)
- **Maguette Gueye** — **Partizani** — 2021–
- **Abdoulaye Khouma Keita** – Dinamo Tirana (2003–2004)
- Malick Mané — Laçi — 2018–19
- Jean Ndecky — Skënderbeu — 2019–20
- Amadou Samb – Teuta (2014)
- **Saliou Sembene** — **Partizani** — 2021–
- Paul Sene – Dinamo Tirana, Teuta (2003–2005)
- Mamadou Sissoko – Besa (2005–2006)
- Albrahim Tamakara – Egnatia (2004–2005)
- Thierno Thioub — Erzeni — 2022–23
- Boubacar Traorè — Teuta — 2018–19

== Serbia ==
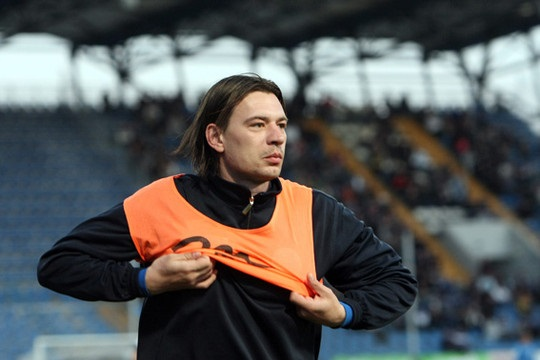
Mladen Brkić scored 41 goals in 122 games for 5 different sides in the Kategoria Superiore between 2008 and 2014

- Shefki Aliti — Erzeni — 2022–23
- Dragan Antanasijević – Partizani (2014)
- Elmir Asani — Skënderbeu — 2018–19
- Nikola Ašćerić – Kastrioti (2012)
- Almir Bejktović – Bylis (2010)
- Petar Borovićanin – Kastrioti (2012)
- Mladen Brkić — Apolonia, Dinamo, Skënderbeu, Flamurtari, Laçi — 2008–12, 2013–14
- Vladimir Buač – Partizani (2013)
- Vilson Caković – Apolonia (2013, 2014–2015)
- Tarik Čmajčanin – Teuta (2016–2017)
- Luka Cucin – Laçi – 2022–23
- Milan Ćulum — Partizani — 2017–18
- Pavle Delibašić – Teuta (2012)
- Mirza Delimeđac — Kukësi — 2022–23
- Aleksandar Desančić — Bylis — 2020–21
- Ivan Disić – Bylis (2009)
- Đorđe Đorđević – Apolonia (2014–2015)
- Nikola Đurić – Flamurtari (2016–2017)
- Uroš Đurić – Egnatia – 2021–22
- Faton Džemaili — Kukësi, Skënderbeu — 2018–20
- Altin Grbović – Shkumbini (2010–2011), Skënderbeu (2011)
- **Ivan Gvozdenović** – Tirana (2010–2011), Skënderbeu (2011–2014), Kukësi (2014–2015)
- Semin Hadžibulić – Teuta (2017–)
- Aleksandar Ignjatović — Laçi — 2019–22
- **Filip Ivanović** – **Teuta** – 2021–
- Djordje Ivković – Laçi – 2022–23
- Ivan Jakovljević — Flamurtari, Luftëtari — 2016–19
- Đuro Jandrić – Elbasani (2011)
- Vladimir Jašić – Vllaznia (2010–2011)
- Miloš Jevđević – Apolonia (2010–2011), Kukësi (2012–2013)
- Marko Jovanović – Vllaznia (2010), Bylis (2011)
- Milan Jovanović – Tirana (2013)
- Dejan Karan – Tirana (2015–2016)
- Nemanja Kojić — Bylis — 2020–21
- Nemanja Lazić – Kastrioti (2012)
- Slavko Lukić – Teuta (2015–2016), Flamurtari (2016)
- Bojan Malinić – Besa (2012–2013)
- Ersin Mehmedović – Vllaznia (2014)
- Borko Milenković – Laçi (2011–2013), Tërbuni (2015–2016)
- Aleksandar Milić – Luftëtari (2012)
- Marko Milivojević – Skënderbeu (2012), Luftëtari (2013)
- Vladan Milosavljev — Luftëtari — 2018–19
- **Milovan Milović** – Dinamo Tirana (2011)
- **Luka Milunović** — **Kukësi** — 2021–
- Predrag Mirčeta – Apolonia (2008–2009)
- **Milan Mirosavljev** — **Partizani** — 2021–
- Goran Mirović – Apolonia (2010)
- Danijel Morariju – Lushnja (2013)
- Petar Mudreša – Apolonia (2010)
- Edin Mujković – Vllaznia (2014)
- Igor Nedeljković — Flamurtari — 2017–18
- Marko Nestorović – Skënderbeu (2010)
- Danilo Nikolić – Dinamo Tirana (2008–2009)
- Milan Nikolić – Luftëtari (2011–2012), Vllaznia (2014)
- Ivan Perić – Kukësi (2014)
- Dušan Popović – Bylis (2010–2012), Apolonia (2012)
- Lazar Popović – Kukësi (2012–2013), Kastrioti (2014)
- Vasilije Prodanović – Kastrioti (2012)
- Marko Putinčanin – Dinamo Tirana (2009–2011)
- Stevan Račić — Partizani, Kamza — 2014–16, 2017–18
- Kenan Ragipović – Apolonia (2009–2010), Kastrioti (2010–2011)
- Marko Rajković – Apolonia (2014–2015)
- Miroslav Rikanović – Elbasani (2011)
- Miloš Rnić – Flamurtari (2016–2017)
- Damir Rovčanin – Laçi (2013)
- Vladimir Savićević – Pogradeci (2011)
- Borislav Simić – Bylis (2015–2016)
- Goran Simov – Bylis (2010)
- Aleksandar Srećković – Apolonia (2008–2009)
- Filip Stojanović – Kastrioti (2011)
- **Miloš Stojanović** — Bylis, Kastrioti, **Vllaznia** — 2020–21, 2022–
- Shqiprim Taipi — Skënderbeu, Kukësi — 2018–23
- Aleksandar Tasić – Tërbuni (2016)
- Vukašin Tomić – Flamurtari (2015)
- Dragan Trajković – Laçi (2011–2012)
- Dragan Ugrenović — Besëlidhja — 2006–07
- Nikola Vasilić — Elbasani — 2010–11
- Dragan Vranić — Elbasani — 2007–08
- Branislav Vukomanović — Kastrioti — 2011–12
- Iljasa Zulfiu — Laçi — 2020–22

== Slovakia ==
- Jozef Menich — Partizani — 2022–23

== Slovenia ==
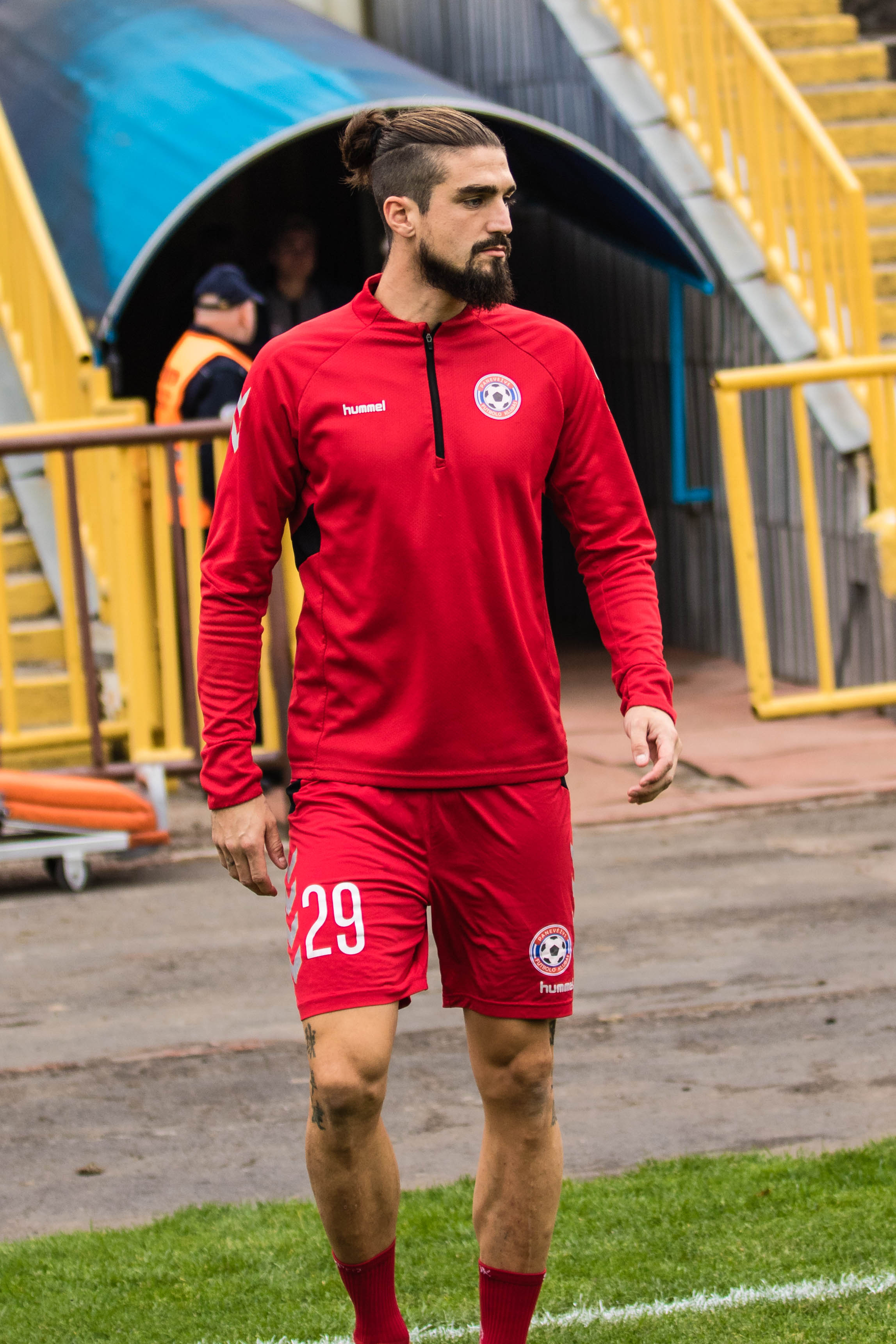
Patrik Bordon played for both Partizani and Bylis during the 2013–14 season

- Patrik Bordon — Partizani, Bylis — 2013–14
- Darijo Biščan — Bylis — 2010–11
- Darko Djukić — Flamurtari — 2009–10
- Dejan Grabič — Skënderbeu — 2010–11
- Marko Krivičič — Erzeni — 2022–23
- Liridon Osmanaj — Partizani — 2014–15
- Almir Sulejmanovič — Elbasani, Skënderbeu — 2010–12
- Dalibor Volaš — Partizani — 2016–17

== Spain ==
- Pablo de Lucas — Kukësi — 2021–22
- Ángel Pindado — Kastrioti — 2013–14
- Eloy Robles — Skënderbeu — 2011–12
- Albert Serrán — Kukësi — 2017–18
- Mamadou Tounkara — Flamurtari — 2017–18

== Sweden ==
- **Alfred Ajdarević** — **Vllaznia** — 2023–
- **Elmando Gjini** — **Teuta** — 2023–
- Alban Jusufi — Vllaznia — 2007–08
- Egzon Sekiraça — Skënderbeu — 2017–19
- Mergim Shala — Skënderbeu — 2020–21

== Sudan ==
- Alexandros Abdel Rahim — Kastrioti, Skënderbeu — 2018–19, 2020–21

== Switzerland ==
- Albion Avdijaj — Skënderbeu, Vllaznia — 2020–21
- **Arlind Dakaj** — **Erzeni** — 2023–
- Lavdrim Ebipi — Kukësi — 2017–18
- Jeton Jakupi — Teuta — 2005–06
- Rrezart Kokollari — Kukësi — 2022–24
- **Beli Muriqi** — **Skënderbeu** — 2019–
- **Anis Mrsic** — **Dinamo Tirana** — 2021–
- Albin Sadrijaj — Vllaznia — 2021–22
- **Toni Salihu** — **Laçi** — 2023–
- Nezbedin Selimi — Laçi, Flamurtari — 2010–12
- Rijat Shala — Teuta, Vllaznia — 2013–15
- **Erduan Smajli** — **Kukësi** — 2022–
- Sadik Vitija — Kukësi — 2020–21

== Togo ==
- Elom Nya-Vedji — Vllaznia — 2020–21

== Turkey ==
- Servet Teufik Agaj — Skënderbeu — 1932–38
- Nusret Basic — Vllaznia — 2001–02
- **Melih İbrahimoğlu** – **Egnatia** – 2023–

== Uganda ==
- Tony Mawejje — Tirana — 2018–19
- Francis Olaki — Tirana — 2014–15
- Yunus Sentamu — Tirana — 2018–19
- Godfrey Walusimbi — Vllaznia — 2019–20

== Ukraine ==
- Mykyta Peterman – Laçi – 2022–23
- Serhiy Romanishyn — Dinamo Tirana, Vllaznia, Besa, Shkumbini — 1999–04, 2005–07

== United States ==
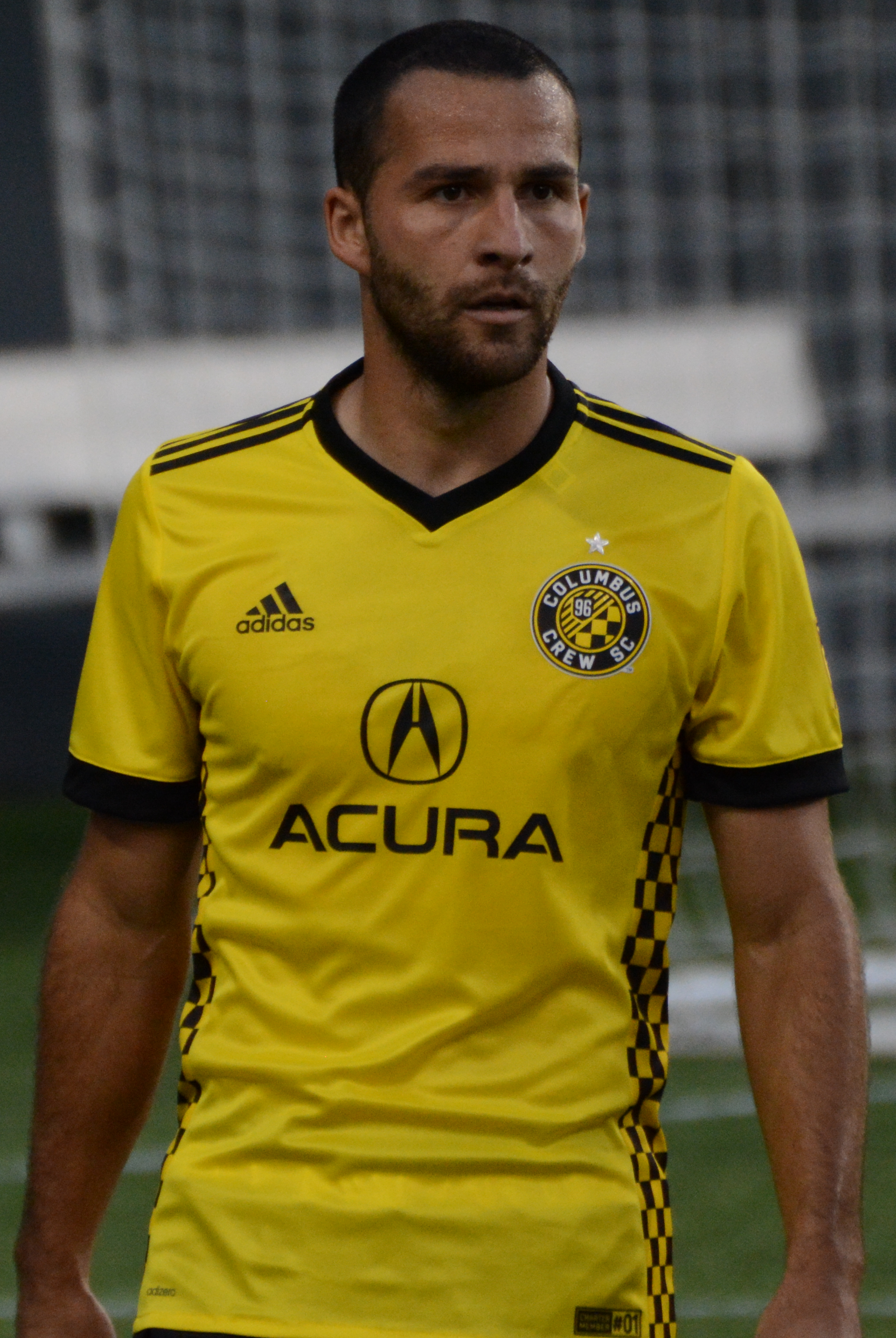
Dilly Duka scored 1 goal in 13 games for Partizani during the 2018–19 season

- **Dion Ahmetaj** — **Tirana** — 2022–
- Thomas Culver — Apolonia — 2012–13
- Dilly Duka — Partizani — 2018–19
- **Realdo Fili** — Apolonia, Partizani, Kamza, Skënderbeu, Luftëtari, **Teuta** — 2012–13, 2014–20, 2023–
- **Gledi Mici** — Kamza, Flamurtari, Kukësi, Skënderbeu, **Tirana** — 2011–18, 2023–
- Bryan Joel Rodriguez — Laçi — 2020–22
- Dembakwi Yomba — Laçi — 2019–20
- Kyrian Nwabueze — Laçi — 2019–21

== Uruguay ==
- Giorginho Aguirre — Vllaznia — 2014–15
- Emiliano Mozzone — Bylis — 2019–20
- Ignacio Nicolini — Flamurtari — 2015–16
- Sebastián Sosa — Vllaznia — 2014–16
- Bruno Toledo — Luftëtari — 2017–18

== Venezuela ==
- Jorge Francisco Casanova — Elbasani — 2008–09
- Aristóteles Romero — Partizani — 2019–20, 2022–23

== Zambia ==
- Charles Chilufya — Shkumbini — 2002–03
- Edward Kangwa — Partizani — 2005–06
- January Zyambo — Bylis, Dinamo Tirana, Vllaznia, Teuta, Kastrioti, Laçi, Kamza — 2002–2010, 2011–12

== Zimbabwe ==
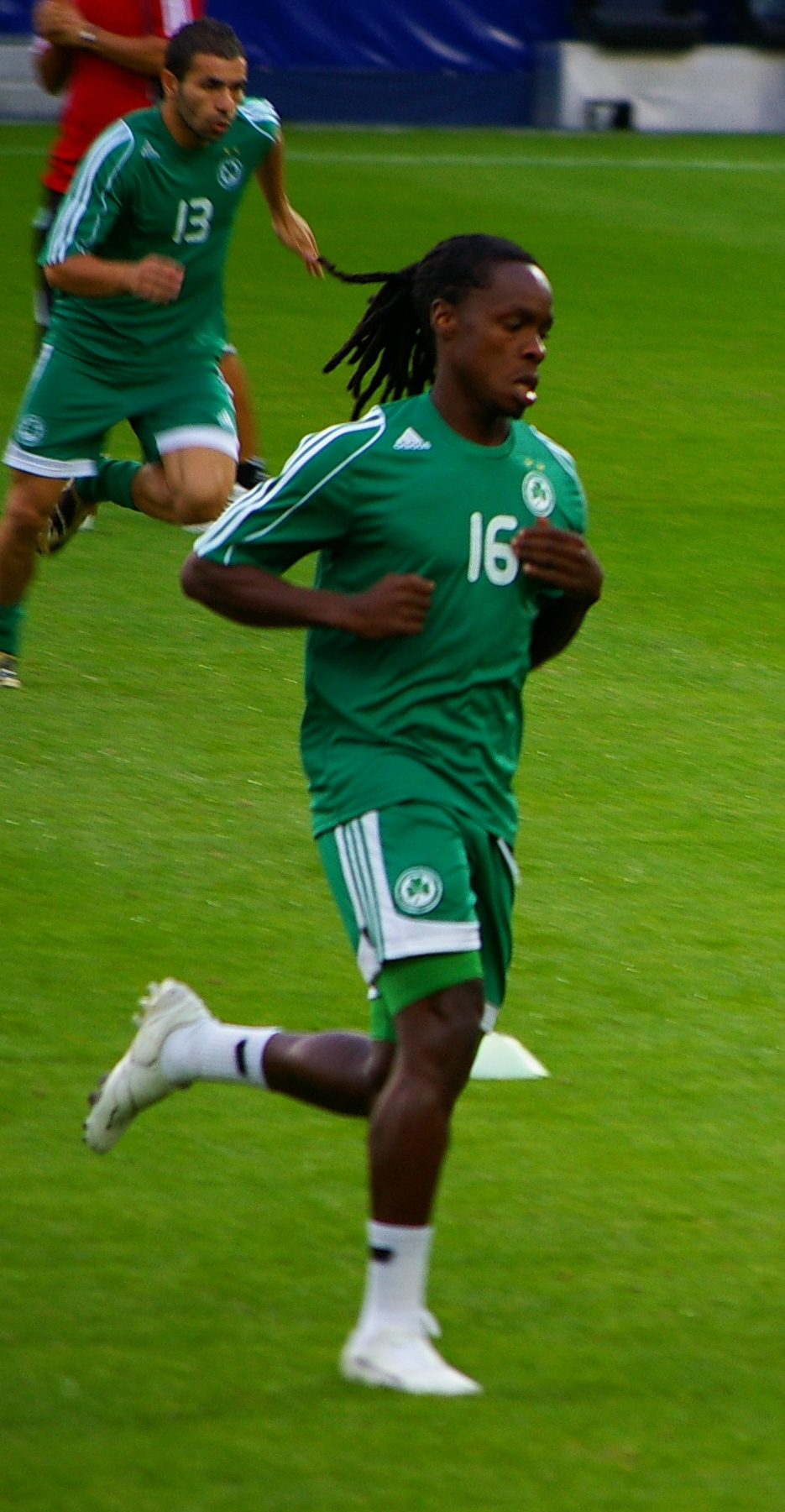
Noel Kaseke scored 4 goals in 22 games for Erzeni during the 2002–03 season

- Noel Kaseke — Erzeni — 2002–03
- Nkosilathi Khumalo — Bylis, Teuta — 2002–04
- Thabathi Masawi — Erzeni — 2002–03

== Notes ==
1. Born in Albania
2. Born in Austria
3. Born in Belgium
4. Born in Bosnia and Herzegovina
5. Born in Bosnia and Herzegovina (then part of SFR Yugoslavia)
6. Born in Switzerland
7. Born in Brazil
8. Born in Cameroon
9. Born in Croatia
10. Born in Croatia (then part of SFR Yugoslavia)
11. Born in Democratic Republic of the Congo (then part of Zaire)
12. Born in France
13. Born in Germany
14. Born in Greece
15. Born in Haiti
16. Born in Italy
17. Born in Kosovo (then part of SFR Yugoslavia)
18. Born in Kosovo (then part of FR Yugoslavia)
19. Born in Montenegro (then part of SFR Yugoslavia)
20. Born in the Netherlands
21. Born in Nigeria
22. Born in North Macedonia (then called FYR Macedonia)
23. Born in North Macedonia (then part of SFR Yugoslavia)
24. Born in Norway
25. Born in Portugal
26. Born in Serbia (then part of SFR Yugoslavia)
27. Born in Serbia (then part of FR Yugoslavia)
28. Born in Sierra Leone
29. Born in Slovenia
30. Born in Uganda
31. Capped for the Albania national football team
32. Capped for the Albania national under-17 football team
33. Capped for the Albania national under-19 football team
34. Capped for the Albania national under-21 football team
35. Capped for the Austria national under-20 football team
36. Capped for the Belgium national under-16 football team
37. Capped for the Belgium national under-17 football team
38. Capped for the Belgium national under-18 football team
39. Capped for the Belgium national under-21 football team
40. Capped for the Belgium national under-23 football team
41. Capped for the Bosnia and Herzegovina national football team
42. Capped for the Bosnia and Herzegovina national under-21 football team
43. Capped for the Croatia national under-16 football team
44. Capped for the Croatia national under-17 football team
45. Capped for the Croatia national under-18 football team
46. Capped for the Croatia national under-19 football team
47. Capped for the Croatia national under-20 football team
48. Capped for the Croatia national under-21 football team
49. Capped for the France national under-16 football team
50. Capped for the France national under-18 football team
51. Capped for the Germany national under-21 football team
52. Capped for the Kosovo national football team
53. Capped for the Kosovo national under-21 football team
54. Capped for the Kosovo national under-19 football team
55. Capped for the Kosovo national under-16 football team
56. Capped for the North Macedonia national under-21 football team
57. Capped for the Netherlands national under-16 football team
58. Capped for the Netherlands national under-17 football team
59. Capped for the Netherlands national under-21 football team
60. Capped for the Portugal national under-19 football team
61. Capped for the Portugal national under-20 football team
62. Capped for the Serbia and Montenegro national under-19 football team
63. Capped for the Switzerland national under-16 football team
64. Capped for the Switzerland national under-17 football team
65. Capped for the Switzerland national under-18 football team
66. Capped for the Switzerland national under-19 football team
67. Capped for the Slovenia national under-17 football team
