= Muriqi =

Muriqi is an Albanian surname. Notable people with the surname include:

- Arijanet Muric (born 1998), Swiss-Kosovar footballer, known in Albanian as Arijanet Muriqi
- Beli Muriqi (born 1999), Swiss footballer
- Desara Muriqi (born 1985), Albanian rally driver
- Elvir Muriqi (born 1979), Albanian boxer
- Fadil Muriqi (born 1959), Yugoslav footballer
- Vedat Muriqi (born 1994), Kosovar footballer
- Xhevdet Muriqi (born 1963), Kosovar footballer
