= Dwumfour =

Dwumfour is an African surname. Notable people with the surname include:

- Eunice Dwumfour (1993–2023), American councilwoman
- Michael Dwumfour (born 1998), American football player
- Randy Dwumfour (born 2000), Ghanaian footballer
