= Jamie Phoenix =

English footballer

Personal information
- Full name: James Anthony Lawrence Phoenix
- Date of birth: 15 January 1984 (age 42)
- Place of birth: Manchester, England
- Positions: Midfielder; winger; forward

Youth career
- Manchester City

Senior career*
Years	Team	Apps	(Gls)
- Nantwich Town
- United of Manchester
2007	Đồng Tháp		
2007-2008	Sabah		
2010	Vllaznia	6	(0)
2010	Bylis	1	(0)
2013	Luftëtari	1	(0)
- Northwich Victoria
- * Club domestic league appearances and goals

James Anthony Lawrence Phoenix (born 15 January 1984) is an English former footballer who played as a midfielder, winger, or forward.

== Career ==
As a youth player, Phoenix rejected offers from the youth academies of Manchester United and Liverpool, England's most successful clubs.

Before the 2007 season, he signed for Đồng Tháp in Vietnam after playing for English non-league side United of Manchester.

In 2007, he signed for Sabah in the Malaysian second division after almost signing for an Omani team.

Before the second half of 2009–10, Phoenix signed for Vllaznia in Albania and he also played for Bylis and Luftëtari in Albania.

In 2013, he signed for English non-league outfit Northwich Victoria.
