= Antonis Karabinas =

Greek footballer

Personal information
- Full name: Antonios Karabinas
- Date of birth: 12 January 1998 (age 28)
- Place of birth: Larissa, Greece
- Height: 1.76 m (5 ft 9 in)
- Position: Left-back

Team information
- Current team: Atromitos Palama

Youth career
- 2012–2013: AE Nikea
- 2013–2014: Tyrnavos
- 2014–2015: Veria
- 2015–2016: Anagennisi Karditsa

Senior career*
Years	Team	Apps	(Gls)
2016–2017	Atromitos Palama	3	(0)
2017	Farkadona	15	(1)
2017–2018	Achilleas Farsala	2	(0)
2018	AEL	0	(0)
2018–2019	Anagennisi Karditsa	15	(1)
2019	Apollon Larissa	0	(0)
2019–2020	Përmeti		
2020	Luftëtari	1	(0)
2020–	Atromitos Palama		
- * Club domestic league appearances and goals as of 4 March 2020

Antonis Karabinas (Greek: Αντώνης Καραμπίνας; born 12 January 1998) is a Greek professional footballer who plays as a left-back for Atromitos Palama.
