= Jean Neves =

Brazilian footballer

Personal information
- Full name: Jean Neves da Silva
- Date of birth: 29 January 1987 (age 39)
- Place of birth: Brazil
- Height: 1.78 m (5 ft 10 in)
- Position: Midfielder

Team information
- Current team: Rondonópolis

Senior career*
Years	Team	Apps	(Gls)
2007–2009	Apolonia	13	(0)
2009	Mixto	7	(0)
2010–2013	Cuiabá	40	(3)
2014–	Rondonópolis		
- * Club domestic league appearances and goals as of 27 November 2011

Jean Neves da Silva (born 29 January 1987) is a Brazilian football player who currently plays for Rondonópolis Esporte Clube. He began his career at Albanian side KS Apolonia Fier.
