= Petar Borovićanin =

Serbian footballer

Personal information
- Full name: Petar Borovićanin
- Date of birth: 6 September 1985 (age 41)
- Place of birth: Belgrade, SFR Yugoslavia
- Height: 1.73 m (5 ft 8 in)
- Position: Left-back

Team information
- Current team: Tramwaj Kraków
- Number: 20

Senior career*
Years	Team	Apps	(Gls)
2001–2004	Čukarički		
2003–2004	Komgrap		
2004–2006	Posavac		
2006–2007	BASK	23	(2)
2007–2008	Kmita Zabierzów	12	(0)
2009–2011	Sandecja Nowy Sącz	52	(1)
2011	Kolejarz Stróże	0	(0)
2012	Bogdanka Łęczna	12	(0)
2012–2013	Kastrioti	4	(0)
2013	Sandecja Nowy Sącz	7	(1)
2013–2014	Puszcza Niepołomice	25	(0)
2014–2015	ROW Rybnik	28	(0)
2015–2016	Garbarnia Kraków	26	(3)
2016	Olympia Stamford SC		
2015–2018	Garbarnia Kraków	24	(1)
2018	Bocheński KS	7	(0)
2020–2021	Orzeł Bębło	21	(4)
2021	Orzeł Iwanowice	1	(0)
2022	Nadwiślan Kraków	2	(0)
2022–	Tramwaj Kraków	25	(2)
- * Club domestic league appearances and goals as of 6 September 2024

Petar Borovićanin (born 6 September 1985) is a Serbian footballer who plays as a left-back for Tramwaj Kraków.

== Honours ==
Garbarnia Kraków

- III liga Lesser Poland–Świętokrzyskie: 2015–16

Tramwaj Kraków

- Klasa A Kraków III: 2023–24
