= Daniel Zaccanti =

Argentine footballer

Personal information
- Full name: Daniel Marcelo Zaccanti
- Date of birth: 27 November 1978 (age 47)
- Place of birth: Buenos Aires, Argentina
- Height: 1.85 m (6 ft 1 in)
- Position: Forward

Youth career
- Racing Club

Senior career*
Years	Team	Apps	(Gls)
1996–1998	Racing Club	27	(12)
1998–1999	Entella	24	(8)
2000–2002	Isernia	42	(4)
2002	KF Tirana	0	(0)
2002	Shkumbini Peqin		(1)
2003	Dinamo Tirana		(0)
2003–2004	KF Tirana	16	(0)
2004	Nuova Albano	1	(0)
2005	Savona	13	(1)
2005	FC Luzern	10	(2)
2006	Carl Zeiss Jena	9	(3)
2006–2007	SpVgg Bayern Hof	26	(17)
2007–2008	TSV Crailsheim	22	(9)
2008–2009	SpVgg Bayern Hof	49	(17)
2010	Fénix		
2010–2012	Tiradente		
2012	Happy Valley		
- * Club domestic league appearances and goals

Daniel Marcelo Zaccanti (born 27 November 1978) is an Argentine former professional footballer who played as a forward.

== Career ==
Zaccanti started his career with Racing Club in Argentina before moving to Italy where he played for Entella and Isernia. He then joined KF Tirana in Albania in the summer of 2002, before playing for both Shkumbini Peqin and Dinamo Tirana during the 2002–03 Albanian Superliga. He played for KF Tirana during the 2003–04 campaign before returning to Italy with Nuova Albano and Savona the following season. He then had a short stint in Switzerland with FC Luzern while they were in the second tier of Swiss football. From there he went on to play for Carl Zeiss Jena, SpVgg Bayern Hof and TSV Crailsheim in Germany. In 2008, he signed for SpVgg Bayern Hof for a second time and joined on 9 February 2010 back to Argentina.
