= Dmitri Simonov =

Russian footballer

Personal information
- Full name: Dmitri Vitalyevich Simonov
- Date of birth: 12 November 1994 (age 32)
- Place of birth: Voronezh, Russia
- Height: 1.83 m (6 ft 0 in)
- Position: Defender

Youth career
- FC Lokomotiv Moscow

Senior career*
| Years | Team | Apps | (Gls) |
| 2014 | FC Stolitsa Moscow | | |
| 2014–2015 | FC Adeli Batumi | 26 | (5) |
| 2015–2016 | FC Fakel Voronezh | 0 | (0) |
| 2016 | FC Olimpik Novaya Usman | | |
| 2017 | FC SKA Rostov-on-Don | 2 | (0) |
| 2017 | KF Korabi Peshkopi | 11 | (0) |
| 2018 | KS Burreli | 12 | (0) |
| Total | | 51 | (5) |
- * Club domestic league appearances and goals

Dmitri Vitalyevich Simonov (Russian: Дмитрий Витальевич Симонов; born 12 November 1994) is a Russian former football player.

== Club career ==
He made his debut in the Russian Professional Football League for FC SKA Rostov-on-Don on 19 March 2017 in a game against FC Rotor Volgograd.
