= Mengbwa Hyacinthe Akamba =

Cameroonian professional footballer

Mengbwa
Personal information
- Full name: Mengbwa Hyacinthe Akamba
- Date of birth: 18 August 1985 (age 41)
- Place of birth: Yaounde, Cameroon
- Height: 1.71 m (5 ft 7 in)
- Position: Midfielder

Team information
- Current team: NK Šampion

Senior career*
Years	Team	Apps	(Gls)
2006	FK Renova		
2010	KF Bylis Ballsh		
2010–2012	NK Šmartno 1928	20	(5)
2012	NK Žalec		
2013	SK Treibach		
2013–2014	NK Žalec		
2014–	NK Šampion	8	(3)
- * Club domestic league appearances and goals as of 20 May 2014

Mengbwa Hyacinthe Akamba (born 18 August 1985) is a Cameroonian professional footballer, who plays as a midfielder for NK Šampion.

== Career ==
Nicknamed "Papso", he was born in Yaonde and he played as striker in Macedonia with FK Renova, then in Albania with KF Bylis Ballsh and KF Elbasani, in Slovenia with NK Šmartno 1928, and in Austria with Traibach.
