= Nkosilathi Khumalo =

Zimbabwean footballer (born 1979)

Personal information
- Full name: Nkosilathi Khumalo
- Date of birth: 27 May 1979 (age 47)
- Place of birth: Bulawayo, Zimbabwe
- Position: Midfielder

Senior career*
Years	Team	Apps	(Gls)
2002	Bylis Ballsh	12	(2)
2003–2004	Teuta Durrës	26	(3)
2004	Njube Sundowns		
2006	Hwange Colliery		
2007–2008	Extension Gunners		
- * Club domestic league appearances and goals as of 1 January 2014

Nkosilathi Khumalo popularly known as "Diego" (born 27 May 1979, in Bulawayo) was a former Zimbabwean football player. He was raised in Victoria Falls where he started his football career.
