= Steeve Gerard Fankà =

Cameroonian footballer

Personal information
- Full name: Steeve Gerard Fankà
- Date of birth: 28 February 1988 (age 38)
- Place of birth: Douala, Cameroon
- Position: Defender

Youth career
- 2006: Astrea
- 2007–2009: Ascoli

Senior career*
Years	Team	Apps	(Gls)
2009–2010	Ascoli	1	(0)
2012–2013	Luftetari Gjirokaster	2	(0)
Total		3	(0)
- * Club domestic league appearances and goals

Steeve Gerard Fankà (born 28 February 1988) is a Cameroonian former professional footballer who played as a defender.

== Biography ==
Born in Douala, Cameroon, Steeve Gerard Fankà started his professional career in Italy. An illegal immigrant, he was signed by Astrea on 20 October 2006 as non-EU amateur player, as he declared that he was not registered as footballer in other nation, but rejected by FIGC because his residence permit did not fulfill the requirement (12 months residence legally before the application, which Fankà started on 16 September 2006), and the appeal rejected on 9 January, thus missing the registration deadline on 31 December.

In the next season, he joined Serie B side Ascoli and played at their Primavera under–20 team. In 2008–09 season, he remained in Primavera team as overage player.

He made his Serie B debut on 16 May 2009, against league strugglers Salernitana, replacing Luigi Giorgi in the 76th minute. The match ended in a 2–0 loss.

In 2009–10 season, he changed his shirt from 87 to 65 but failed to receive any call–up.
