= Leonardo Semião =

Brazilian footballer

Personal information
- Full name: Leonardo Semião Granado
- Date of birth: 10 May 1994 (age 32)
- Place of birth: Assis, São Paulo, Brazil
- Height: 1.87 m (6 ft 2 in)
- Position: Forward

Team information
- Current team: Siena

Youth career
- 2009: Paulistinha
- 2010: Red Bull Brasil

Senior career*
Years	Team	Apps	(Gls)
2011–2012	São Carlos		
2013	CA Juventus		
2013	Goiatuba		
2014–2015	Club Destroyers		
2015	Kukësi		
2015	Victoria Hotspurs		
2016–2017	Bhayangkara		
2017–2018	Messina	1	(0)
2018	Bylis Ballsh	11	(4)
2018	Southern Myanmar		
2018	Rubio Ñu	6	(1)
2019	Castelfidardo	14	(3)
2019	Brindisi	8	(1)
2019–2020	Gravina	8	(1)
2020–2021	Nardò	26	(0)
2021	Molfetta	11	(0)
2021–2022	Mezzolara	21	(6)
2022	Tivoli	11	(0)
2023	Chisola	18	(2)
2023–	Siena		
- * Club domestic league appearances and goals as of 19:08, 13 November 2023 (UTC)

Leonardo Semião Granado (born 10 May 1994) is a Brazilian professional footballer who plays as a forward for Siena in the Italian Eccellenza.

== Career ==
Semião was born in Assis, São Paulo.

He left Club Destroyers and joined Albanian Superliga side FK Kukësi in June during their preseason training camp in Austria, ahead of the Europa League first qualifying round. He missed out on the tie against Belarusian side FC Torpedo-BelAZ Zhodino in the first qualifying round due to his paperwork not going through in time, but he was able to be selected for the second qualifying round
