= Randy Dwumfour =

Ghanaian footballer (born 2000)

Personal information
- Date of birth: 23 November 2000 (age 25)
- Place of birth: Accra, Ghana
- Height: 1.76 m (5 ft 9 in)
- Position: Midfielder

Team information
- Current team: Vllaznia Shkodër
- Number: 20

Senior career*
Years	Team	Apps	(Gls)
2020–2026	Skënderbeu	130	(2)
2026–	Vllaznia Shkodër	0	(0)
- * Club domestic league appearances and goals as of 1 June 2024

Randy Dwumfour (born 23 November 2000) is a Ghanaian professional footballer who play as a midfielder for the Albanian Kategoria Superiore club Vllaznia Shkodër.
