= Beli Muriqi =

Swiss footballer (born 1999)

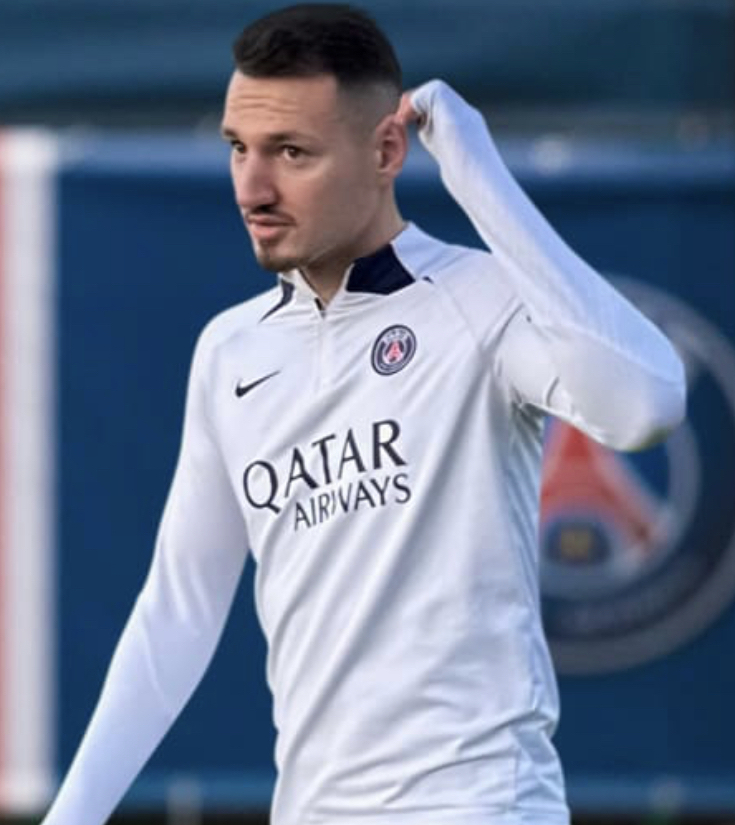
- Muriqi with Paris Saint-Germain kit in 2022

Personal information
- Full name: Beli Lukaj Muriqi
- Date of birth: 4 December 1999 (age 26)
- Place of birth: Aarau, Switzerland
- Height: 1.83 m (6 ft 0 in)
- Position: Midfielder

Youth career
- –2017: Aarau
- 2017–2020: Lazio

Senior career*
Years	Team	Apps	(Gls)
2020	Skënderbeu Korçë	0	(0)
2022	Zimbru Chișinău	5	(0)
Total		5	(0)
- * Club domestic league appearances and goals

Beli Lukaj Muriqi (born 4 December 1999), also known as Beli Muriqi, is a Swiss former professional footballer who plays as a midfielder.

== Career ==
=== Youth career ===
Muriqi started playing football for his hometown club, Aarau and was part of it until 31 August 2017, when he joined the youth academy of Italian Serie A side Lazio. His debut with Lazio's youth academy came on 13 January 2018 against Torino after being named in the starting line-up and scored his side's only goal during a 3–1 away defeat.

=== Skënderbeu Korçë ===
On 31 January 2020, Muriqi joined Kategoria Superiore side Skënderbeu Korçë. Twelve days later, he was named as a Skënderbeu Korçë substitute for the first time in 2019–20 Albanian Cup second round against Besa Kavajë. In addition to this match, Muriqi was eight times as a substitute, but without the possibility of debut.

=== Zimbru Chișinău ===
On 7 March 2022, Muriqi joined Moldovan National Division side Zimbru Chișinău and received squad number 20. On 3 April 2022, he made his debut in a 0–0 away draw against Dinamo-Auto after being named in the starting line-up.

== Personal life ==
Muriqi was born in Aarau, Switzerland to Kosovo Albanian parents from Peja.
