= 2021–22 FK Partizani Tirana season =

Partizani Tirana
2021–22 season
- President: Gazmend Demi
- Head coach: Ilir Daja (until 28 December 2021); Dritan Mehmeti (from 28 December 2021)
- Stadium: Arena Kombëtare; Elbasan Arena
- Kategoria Superiore: 3rd
- Albanian Cup: Semi-finals
- Europa Conference League: Second qualifying round
- Top goalscorer: League: Stênio Júnior (12); All: Stênio Júnior (19)
Home colours	Away colours

In the 2021–22 season, Partizani Tirana competed in the Kategoria Superiore for the ninth consecutive season.

== First-team squad ==
Squad at end of season

Note: Flags indicate national team as defined under FIFA eligibility rules; some limited exceptions apply. Players may hold more than one non-FIFA nationality.

No.	Pos.	Nation	Player
1	GK	ALB	Vokli Laroshi
2	DF	MKD	Egzon Belica
4	DF	ALB	Albion Marku (on loan from Lokomotiva)
6	DF	ALB	Geri Selita
7	MF	ALB	Herald Marku
8	MF	CGO	Chandrel Massanga
9	FW	ALB	Xhuliano Skuka
10	MF	ALB	Sherif Kallaku (on loan from Lokomotiva)
12	GK	ALB	Alban Hoxha (captain)
14	MF	SEN	Maguette Gueye
15	DF	KOS	Loti Celina
16	DF	MKD	Aleksandar Damchevski
17	MF	ALB	Gehard Hasa
18	MF	BRA	Stênio Júnior
20	MF	ALB	Esat Mala (on loan from Giresunspor)

No.	Pos.	Nation	Player
21	MF	ALB	Valentino Murataj
22	FW	ALB	Tedi Cara
23	FW	ALB	Gresild Lika
24	FW	SRB	Milan Mirosavljev
27	FW	ALB	Franc Marinaj
28	DF	ALB	Eljon Sota
34	DF	SEN	Saliou Sembene
35	MF	ALB	Xhafer Hodo
38	MF	ALB	Kristi Kote
44	DF	ALB	Andi Hadroj
77	GK	ALB	Aldo Teqja
88	MF	ALB	Dean Liço (on loan from Ascoli)
96	DF	ALB	Eneo Bitri
99	MF	ALB	Arinaldo Rrapaj

=== Out on loan ===
Note: Flags indicate national team as defined under FIFA eligibility rules; some limited exceptions apply. Players may hold more than one non-FIFA nationality.

No.	Pos.	Nation	Player
19	MF	ALB	Agim Dajçi (on loan at Besa)

== Competitions ==
=== Overview ===
Competition	First match	Last match	Starting round	Final position	Record							
Competition	First match	Last match	Starting round	Final position	Pld	W	D	L	GF	GA	GD	Win %
Kategoria Superiore	10 September 2021	26 May 2022	Matchday 1	3rd	36	15	13	8	52	30	+22	41.67
Albanian Cup	22 September 2021	13 April 2022	First round	Semi-finals	8	5	3	0	12	2	+10	62.50
Europa Conference League	8 July 2021	29 July 2021	First qualifying round	Second qualifying round	4	2	0	2	8	9	−1	50.00
Total					48	22	16	10	72	41	+31	45.83

Last updated: 26 May 2022
Source: Competitions

=== Kategoria Superiore ===
==== League table ====
Pos	Team	Pld	W	D	L	GF	GA	GD	Pts	Qualification or relegation
1	Tirana (C)	36	22	7	7	64	27	+37	73	Qualification for the Champions League first qualifying round
2	Laçi	36	18	9	9	52	33	+19	63	Qualification for the Europa Conference League first qualifying round
3	Partizani	36	15	13	8	52	30	+22	58	Qualification for the Europa Conference League first qualifying round
4	Kukësi	36	15	10	11	50	44	+6	55 (Note: Kukësi is ahead of Vllaznia on head-to-head goal difference: Kukësi 4, Vllaznia 3)	
5	Vllaznia	36	13	16	7	47	38	+9	55	Qualification for the Europa Conference League second qualifying round (Note: Vllaznia qualified for the Europa Conference League second qualifying round as the 2021–22 Albanian Cup winners.)

Source: Albanian Football Association, Soccerway
Rules for classification: 1) Points; 2) Head-to-head points; 3) Head-to-head goal difference; 4) Head-to-head goals scored; 5) Goal difference; 6) Goals scored; 7) Draw.
(C) Champions

==== Results summary ====
Overall								Home						Away					
Pld	W	D	L	GF	GA	GD	Pts	W	D	L	GF	GA	GD	W	D	L	GF	GA	GD
36	15	13	8	52	30	+22	58	8	8	2	31	16	+15	7	5	6	21	14	+7

Last updated: 26 May 2022.
Source: Competitive matches

==== Results by round ====
Round	1	2	3	4	5	6	7	8	9	10	11	12	13	14	15	16	17	18	19	20	21	22	23	24	25	26	27	28	29	30	31	32	33	34	35	36
Ground	A	A	H	A	H	A	H	A	H	H	H	A	H	A	H	A	H	A	A	A	H	A	H	A	H	A	H	H	H	A	H	A	H	A	H	A
Result	L	D	D	D	D	L	D	W	D	W	W	L	W	L	L	W	D	L	W	W	D	D	W	D	D	L	W	W	D	D	W	W	L	W	W	W
Position	6	6	6	7	7	8	8	8	8	7	5	6	6	6	6	5	5	5	5	5	5	5	5	5	5	5	5	4	4	4	3	3	4	3	3	3

Updated to match(es) played on 26 May 2022. Source: Competitive matches
A = Away; H = Home; W = Win; D = Draw; L = Loss

==== Matches ====
10 September 2021 1	Teuta	1–0	Partizani	Elbasan
19:45 CEST	Gorgiev 18'	Report		Stadium: Elbasan Arena; Referee: Juxhin Xhaja

18 September 2021 2	Skënderbeu	1–1	Partizani	Korçë
16:45 CEST	Berisha 57'	Report	Júnior 56' (pen.)	Stadium: Skënderbeu Stadium; Referee: Florjan Lata

26 September 2021 3	Partizani	1–1	Vllaznia	Elbasan
19:45 CEST	Rrapaj 88'	Report	da Silva 4'	Stadium: Elbasan Arena; Referee: Andi Koçi

1 October 2021 4	Dinamo Tirana	1–1	Partizani	Elbasan
19:45 CEST	Ibraimi 15'	Report	Júnior 76' (pen.)	Stadium: Elbasan Arena

17 October 2021 5	Partizani	1–1	Kukësi	Tirana
16:45 CEST	Cara 65'	Report	Feijão 70'	Stadium: Arena Kombëtare; Referee: Florjan Lata

25 October 2021 6	Tirana	1–0	Partizani	Tirana
19:45 CEST	Limaj 45+8' (pen.)	Report		Stadium: Arena Kombëtare; Referee: Eldorjan Hamiti

31 October 2021 7	Partizani	1–1	Egnatia	Tirana
16:45 CET	Cara 45+2'	Report	Jackson 6'	Stadium: Arena Kombëtare; Referee: Laver Alla

7 November 2021 8	Kastrioti	0–2	Partizani	Kamëz
13:45 CET		Report	Musta 37'; Rrapaj 90+1'	Stadium: Kamëz Stadium; Referee: Klodian Shahini

20 November 2021 9	Partizani	1–1	Laçi	Tirana
19:45 CET	Cara 79'	Report	Shehu 35' (pen.)	Stadium: Arena Kombëtare; Referee: Juxhin Xhaja

26 November 2021 10	Partizani	2–1	Teuta	Elbasan
16:45 CET	Júnior 90' (pen.); Cara 90+6'	Report	Gorgiev 26'	Stadium: Elbasan Arena; Referee: Kreshnik Barjamaj

4 December 2021 11	Partizani	2–1	Skënderbeu	Tirana
16:45 CET	Rrapaj 14'; Cara 31'	Report	Mensah 20'	Stadium: Arena Kombëtare; Referee: Olsion Yzeiraj

8 December 2021 12	Vllaznia	1–0	Partizani	Shkodër
16:45 CET	Latifi 29'	Report		Stadium: Loro Boriçi Stadium; Referee: Florjan Lata

13 December 2021 13	Partizani	1–0	Dinamo Tirana	Tirana
19:45 CET	Mala 71'	Report		Stadium: Arena Kombëtare; Referee: Kreshnik Barjamaj

19 December 2021 14	Kukësi	2–1	Partizani	Shkodër
16:45 CET	Musta 71' (o.g.); Taipi 83'	Report	Musta 11'	Stadium: Loro Boriçi Stadium; Referee: Florjan Lata

23 December 2021 15	Partizani	1–2	Tirana	Tirana
19:45 CET	Júnior 86' (pen.)	Report	Përgjoni 27'; Xhixha 90+10'	Stadium: Arena Kombëtare; Referee: Juxhin Xhaja

16 January 2022 16	Egnatia	0–3	Partizani	Rrogozhinë
13:45 CET		Report	Mala 47'; Skuka 61'; Rrapaj 73'	Stadium: Arena Egnatia; Referee: Kreshnik Barjamaj

22 January 2022 17	Partizani	0–0	Kastrioti	Elbasan
13:45 CET		Report		Stadium: Elbasan Arena; Referee: Olsion Yzeiraj

31 January 2022 18	Laçi	1–0	Partizani	Laç
13:45 CET	Lushkja 79'	Report		Stadium: Laçi Stadium; Referee: Kreshnik Cjapi

5 February 2022 19	Teuta	0–4	Partizani	Elbasan
16:45 CET		Report	Skuka 3'; Cara 28'; Sota 60'; Júnior 90+2'	Stadium: Elbasan Arena; Referee: Juxhin Xhaja

14 February 2022 20	Skënderbeu	1–2	Partizani	Korçë
16:45 CET	Mensah 60'	Report	Skuka 76', 89'	Stadium: Skënderbeu Stadium; Referee: Erjon Bastari

19 February 2022 21	Partizani	1–1	Vllaznia	Tirana
16:45 CET	Cara 65'	Report	Latifi 11' (pen.)	Stadium: Arena Kombëtare; Referee: Florjan Lata

25 February 2022 22	Dinamo Tirana	0–0	Partizani	Elbasan
19:45 CET		Report		Stadium: Elbasan Arena; Referee: Enea Jorgj

2 March 2022 23	Partizani	5–0	Kukësi	Tirana
16:45 CET	Kallaku 36' (pen.); Skuka 40'; Júnior 46'; Lika 89'; Marku 90+3'	Report		Stadium: Arena Kombëtare; Referee: Erjon Bastari

5 March 2022 24	Tirana	0–0	Partizani	Tirana
19:45 CET		Report		Stadium: Arena Kombëtare; Referee: Juxhin Xhaja

12 March 2022 25	Partizani	2–2	Egnatia	Elbasan
16:45 CET	Júnior 60', 90+4'	Report	Shyti 24'; Shtubina 88'	Stadium: Elbasan Arena; Referee: Florjan Lata

19 March 2022 26	Kastrioti	1–0	Partizani	Kamëz
13:45 CET	Kainã 79'	Report		Stadium: Kamëz Stadium; Referee: Laver Alla

4 April 2022 27	Partizani	2–1	Laçi	Elbasan
17:45 CEST	Bitri 10'; Skuka 59' (pen.)	Report	Akinyemi 47'	Stadium: Elbasan Arena; Referee: Kreshnik Cjapi

9 April 2022 28	Partizani	3–1	Teuta	Elbasan
16:45 CEST	Skuka 45+2'; Bitri 53'; Mirosavljev 90+6'	Report	Ivanović 27'	Stadium: Elbasan Arena; Referee: Eldorjan Hamiti

17 April 2022 29	Partizani	0–0	Skënderbeu	Elbasan
16:45 CEST		Report		Stadium: Elbasan Arena; Referee: Ardian Beqiri

23 April 2022 30	Vllaznia	0–0	Partizani	Shkodër
16:45 CEST		Report		Stadium: Loro Boriçi Stadium; Referee: Juxhin Xhaja

29 April 2022 31	Partizani	3–1	Dinamo Tirana	Tirana
16:45 CEST	Júnior 26'; Cara 30', 90+2'	Report	Ibraimi 38' (pen.)	Stadium: Selman Stërmasi Stadium; Referee: Kreshnik Cjapi

3 May 2022 32	Kukësi	1–2	Partizani	Kukës
16:45 CEST	Milunović 52'	Report	Júnior 26', 40'	Stadium: Kukës Arena; Referee: Eldorjan Hamiti

7 May 2022 33	Partizani	1–2	Tirana	Elbasan
18:45 CEST	Skuka 21'	Report	Seferi 27'; Totre 47'	Stadium: Elbasan Arena; Referee: Eldorjan Hamiti

14 May 2022 34	Egnatia	0–1	Partizani	Rrogozhinë
17:00 CEST		Report	Rrapaj 45+2'	Stadium: Arena Egnatia; Referee: Indrit Myrtja

21 May 2022 35	Partizani	4–0	Kastrioti	Elbasan
17:00 CEST	Marku 48'; Skuka 57'; Cara 80'; Gueye 84'	Report		Stadium: Elbasan Arena; Referee: Klodian Shahini

26 May 2022 36	Laçi	3–4	Partizani	Laç
17:00 CEST	Zulfiu 9'; Guindo 71'; Qato 90+1'	Report	Júnior 32'; Murataj 44'; Rrapaj 60'; Kote 90+4'	Stadium: Laçi Stadium; Referee: Olti Çela

=== Albanian Cup ===
==== First round ====
22 September 2021 First leg	Tërbuni	0−3	Partizani	Pukë
16:00 CEST		Report	Júnior 22'; Filipović 24'; Mala 42'	Stadium: Ismail Xhemali Stadium; Referee: Olsi Sokoli

13 October 2021 Second leg	Partizani	3−0 (6–0 agg.)	Tërbuni	Barbas
13:30 CEST	Filipović 53'; Murataj 79'; Musta 86'	Report		Stadium: Football Republic; Referee: Qazim Copa

==== Second round ====
3 November 2021 First leg	Besëlidhja	0−1	Partizani	Lezhë
14:00 CET		Report	Júnior 8' (pen.)	Stadium: Brian Filipi Stadium; Referee: Emanuela Rusta

17 November 2021 Second leg	Partizani	2−0 (3–0 agg.)	Besëlidhja	Cërrik
13:30 CET	Rrapaj 80'; Júnior 85'	Report		Stadium: Nexhip Trungu Stadium; Referee: Qazim Copa

==== Quarter-finals ====
27 January 2022 First leg	Dinamo Tirana	1−1	Partizani	Tirana
16:45 CET	Ibraimi 43' (pen.)	Report	Cara 24'	Stadium: Arena Kombëtare; Referee: Florjan Lata

10 February 2022 Second leg	Partizani	1−0 (2–1 agg.)	Dinamo Tirana	Tirana
18:00 CET	Skuka 44'	Report		Stadium: Arena Kombëtare; Referee: Juxhin Xhaja

==== Semi-finals ====
31 March 2022 First leg	Partizani	0−0	Vllaznia	Elbasan
17:45 CEST		Report		Stadium: Elbasan Arena; Referee: Olsid Ferataj

13 April 2022 Second leg	Vllaznia	1−1 (a.e.t.) (1–1 agg.) (5−4 p)	Partizani	Shkodër
17:45 CEST	Aralica 27'	Report	Mala 3'	Stadium: Loro Boriçi Stadium; Referee: Juxhin Xhaja
	Penalties
	Gurishta (penalty scored); Hoxhaj (penalty scored); Adili (penalty scored); Gjurgjevikj (penalty scored); Latifi (penalty scored)		(penalty missed) Skuka; (penalty scored) Massanga; (penalty scored) Hoxha; (penalty scored) Mirosavljev; (penalty scored) Murataj

=== UEFA Europa Conference League ===
==== First qualifying round ====
8 July 2021 First leg	Partizani (Albania)	5–2	(Moldova) Sfîntul Gheorghe	Elbasan, Albania
20:00	Lucas Cardoso 17', 85'; Júnior 26', 61'; Cara 78'	Report	Volkov 44' (pen.); Solodovnicov 80'	Stadium: Elbasan Arena; Attendance: 700; Referee: Lukas Fähndrich (Switzerland)

15 July 2021 Second leg	Sfîntul Gheorghe (Moldova)	2–3 (4–8 agg.)	(Albania) Partizani	Orhei, Moldova
19:00	Volkov 4' (pen.); Solodovnicov 22'	Report	Cara 15'; Júnior 42', 55'	Stadium: CSR Orhei; Attendance: 500; Referee: Vassilis Fotias (Greece)

==== Second qualifying round ====
22 July 2021 First leg	Basel (Switzerland)	3–0	(Albania) Partizani	Basel, Switzerland
20:15	Stocker 43', 80'; Cabral 52'	Report		Stadium: St. Jakob-Park; Attendance: 6,095; Referee: Dennis Higler (Netherlands)

29 July 2021 Second leg	Partizani (Albania)	0–2 (0–5 agg.)	(Switzerland) Basel	Elbasan, Albania
20:00		Report	Stocker 37'; Cabral 50'	Stadium: Elbasan Arena; Attendance: 950; Referee: Aristotelis Diamantopoulos (Greece)
