= 2021–22 Albanian Cup =

Kupa e Shqipërisë

Tournament details
- Country: Albania
- Teams: 32

Final positions
- Champions: Vllaznia (8th title)
- Runners-up: Laçi

Tournament statistics
- Matches played: 63
- Goals scored: 156 (2.48 per match)
- Top goal scorer(s): Zinedin Mustedanagić (6 goals)

2021–22 Albanian Cup (Albanian: Kupa e Shqipërisë) was the seventieth season of Albania's annual cup competition, the Albanian Cup. Vllaznia defended the trophy, winning their eighth title in the competition.

== Format ==
Ties were played in a two-legged format similar to those of European competitions. If the aggregate score was tied after both games, the match was decided by extra time and a penalty shoot-out, if necessary.

== Preliminary round ==
In order to reduce the number of participating teams for the First round to 32, a preliminary tournament is played. In contrast to the main tournament, the preliminary tournament is held as a single-leg knock-out competition. The matches were played on 11 September 2021.

Team 1	Score	Team 2
Sopoti (III)	1−2	Luzi 2008 (III)
Labëria (III)	3−0	Devolli (III)

11 September 2021	Sopoti	1−2	Luzi 2008	Sopoti Stadium, Librazhd
15:30 CEST	Sejdini 79' (pen.)		Tanushi 15' (o.g.); Camara 40'	Referee: Laver Alla

Luzi 2008 advanced to the first round.

11 September 2021	Labëria	3−0	Devolli	Labëria Complex, Nartë
15:30 CEST	Mirani 18'; Dalanaj 70'; Kamberaj 88'			Referee: Qazim Copa

Labëria advanced to the first round.

== First round ==
All 30 eligible teams of the 2021–22 Kategoria Superiore and 2021–22 Kategoria e Parë will enter in this round along with 6 teams from Kategoria e Dytë. The matches were played on 22 September 2021, 13 and 14 October 2021.

Team 1	Agg.	Team 2	1st leg	2nd leg
Luzi 2008 (III)	3−6	Teuta (I)	1−4	2−2
Tërbuni (II)	0−6	Partizani (I)	0−3	0−3
Shkumbini (II)	0−9	Tirana (I)	0−3	0−6
Veleçiku (III)	0−7	Skënderbeu (I)	0−3	0−4
Oriku (III)	1−7	Bylis (II)	1−2	0−5
Erzeni (II)	1−2	Dinamo Tirana (I)	1−0	0−2
Besëlidhja (II)	4−2	Burreli (II)	0−0	4−2
Vora (II)	3−5	Korabi (II)	2−1	1−4
Labëria (III)	2−5	Vllaznia (I)	2−1	0−4
Butrinti (II)	1−5	Laçi (I)	1−1	0−4
Maliqi (II)	0−4	Kukësi (I)	0−0	0−4
Elbasani (III)	0−4	Kastrioti (I)	0−2	0−2
Flamurtari (III)	2−2 (a.e.t.) (7−6 p)	Apolonia (II)	1−1	1−1
Turbina (II)	1−2	Egnatia (I)	1−1	0−1
Lushnja (II)	0−3	Tomori (II)	0−3	0−0
Besa (II)	1−2	Pogradeci (II)	1−0	0−2

22 September 2021	Luzi 2008	1−4	Teuta	Luz i Vogël Stadium, Luz i Vogël
16:00 CEST	Myrta 32'		Jazxhi 16'; Zogaj 45+1'; Kapllani 47'; Kallaku 73'	Referee: Ervin Kotemelo

13 October 2021	Teuta	2−2	Luzi 2008	Niko Dovana Stadium, Durrës
13:00 CEST	Gorgiev 15'; Kapllani 32'		Soumah 26'; Merdini 42'	Referee: Edvin Hoxha

Teuta advanced to the second round.

22 September 2021	Tërbuni	0−3	Partizani	Ismail Xhemali Stadium, Pukë
16:00 CEST			Stênio Júnior 22'; Filipović 24'; Mala 42'	Referee: Olsi Sokoli

13 October 2021	Partizani	3−0	Tërbuni	Football Republic, Barbas
13:30 CEST	Filipović 53'; Murataj 79'; Musta 86'			Referee: Qazim Copa

Partizani advanced to the second round.

22 September 2021	Shkumbini	0−3	Tirana	Shkumbini Stadium, Peqin
16:00 CEST			Xhixha 7'; Beshiraj 16', 87'	Referee: Emanuela Rusta

13 October 2021	Tirana	6−0	Shkumbini	Selman Stërmasi Stadium, Tirana
13:30 CEST	Limaj 11', 45'; Xhixha 21', 25', 27'; Bali 35' (o.g.)			Referee: Silvio Dyrmishi

Tirana advanced to the second round.

22 September 2021	Veleçiku	0−3	Skënderbeu	Reshit Rusi Stadium, Shkodër
16:00 CEST			Vangjeli 34'; Ngissah 40'; Pusi 65'	Referee: Elton Hazizaj

13 October 2021	Skënderbeu	4−0	Veleçiku	Tropikal Complex, Durrës
13:30 CEST	Ngissah 10', 48'; Nikaj 30'; Vitija 33'			Referee: Geisi Velçani

Skënderbeu advanced to the second round.

22 September 2021	Oriku	1−2	Bylis	Orikum Stadium, Orikum
16:00 CEST	Bashaj 24'		Emini 15'; Carkanji 73'	Referee: Granit Sulko

14 October 2021	Bylis	5−0	Oriku	Adush Muça Stadium, Ballsh
13:30 CEST	Osmani 1', 37'; Spahiu 36', 82'; Alinani 80'			Referee: Xhulio Agolli

Bylis advanced to the second round.

22 September 2021	Erzeni	1−0	Dinamo Tirana	Tofik Jashari Stadium, Shijak
16:00 CEST	Xhabrahimi 55'			Referee: Albano Stolaj

14 October 2021	Dinamo Tirana	2−0	Erzeni	Arena Egnatia, Rrogozhinë
13:30 CEST	Sidibe 2'; Ibraimi 8'			Referee: Erald Demiraj

Dinamo Tirana advanced to the second round.

22 September 2021	Besëlidhja	0−0	Burreli	Brian Filipi Stadium, Lezhë
16:00 CEST				Referee: Besnard Kaimi

14 October 2021	Burreli	2−4	Besëlidhja	Liri Ballabani Stadium, Burrel
13:30 CEST	Përvataj 80', 83'		Jeremić 45'; Jaku 55', 69'; Marku 90+1'	Referee: Bekris Dragusha

Besëlidhja advanced to the second round.

22 September 2021	Vora	2−1	Korabi	Internacional Complex, Pezë Helmës
16:00 CEST	Lushaku 77'; Demaj 85'		Raza 88'	Referee: Andi Koçi

13 October 2021	Korabi	4−1	Vora	Korabi Stadium, Peshkopi
13:30 CEST	Marku 3', 11'; Dragoj 83'; Çutra 90+3'		Ismailaj 28' (pen.)	Referee: Ermal Gryka

Korabi advanced to the second round.

22 September 2021	Labëria	2−1	Vllaznia	Labëria Complex, Nartë
16:00 CEST	Dalanaj 43' (pen.); Kamberaj 49'		Çoba 34'	Referee: Mikele Dyrmishi

13 October 2021	Vllaznia	4−0	Labëria	Reshit Rusi Stadium, Shkodër
13:30 CEST	Gjurgjevikj 32'; Aralica 79'; Mustedanagić 80'; Herić 89'			Referee: Besnard Kaimi

Vllaznia advanced to the second round.

22 September 2021	Butrinti	1−1	Laçi	Andon Lapa Stadium, Sarandë
13:30 CEST	Malaj 49'		Ademi 17'	Referee: Geisi Velçani

13 October 2021	Laçi	4−0	Butrinti	Internacional Complex, Pezë Helmës
13:30 CEST	Guindo 20'; Deliu 72'; Ziko 86'; Prengaj 90+3'			Referee: Ermis Çelaj

Laçi advanced to the second round.

22 September 2021	Maliqi	0−0	Kukësi	Sopoti Stadium, Librazhd
16:00 CEST				Referee: Silvio Dyrmishi

13 October 2021	Kukësi	4−0	Maliqi	National Sports Centre, Kamëz
13:30 CEST	Daci 45+1'; Krnić 56'; Gavazaj 71'; Sula 90+2'			Referee: Emanuela Rusta

Kukësi advanced to the second round.

22 September 2021	Elbasani	0−2	Kastrioti	Redi Maloku Stadium, Fushë-Krujë
16:00 CEST			Greca 16'; Ajazi 80'	Referee: Endrit Zhuli

13 October 2021	Kastrioti	2−0	Elbasani	Redi Maloku Stadium, Fushë-Krujë
13:30 CEST	Ajazi 60'; Neziri 90' (pen.)			Referee: Xhulian Bacaj

Kastrioti advanced to the second round.

22 September 2021	Flamurtari	1−1	Apolonia	Flamurtari Stadium, Vlorë
16:00 CEST	Diamanti 66' (pen.)		Topi 74'	Referee: Mirela Çemeri

13 October 2021	Apolonia	1−1 (a.e.t.) (6−7 p)	Flamurtari	Loni Papuçiu Stadium, Fier
13:30 CEST	Omeri 31'		Gocaj 49' (pen.)	Referee: Endrit Zhuli

Flamurtari advanced to the second round.

22 September 2021	Turbina	1−1	Egnatia	Nexhip Trungu Stadium, Cërrik
16:00 CEST	Brahilika 33' (pen.)		Shtubina 88'	Referee: Ditmir Grimci

13 October 2021	Egnatia	1−0	Turbina	Arena Egnatia, Rrogozhinë
13:30 CEST	Bardis 90+1'			Referee: Ervin Kotemelo

Egnatia advanced to the second round.

22 September 2021	Lushnja	0−3	Tomori	Roza Haxhiu Stadium, Lushnjë
16:00 CEST			Manellari 13' (pen.); Oshafi 38'; Pepa 54'	Referee: Olsion Yzeriaj

14 October 2021	Tomori	0−0	Lushnja	Tomori Stadium, Berat
13:30 CEST				Referee: Mikele Dyrmishi

Tomori advanced to the second round.

22 September 2021	Besa	1−0	Pogradeci	Besa Stadium, Kavajë
14:00 CEST	Hoxhaj 62'			Referee: Fiorelo Pjetrushi

13 October 2021	Pogradeci	2−0	Besa	Gjorgji Kyçyku Stadium, Pogradec
13:30 CEST	Laçka 57'; Muçllari 88'			Referee: Sokol Bebja

Pogradeci advanced to the second round.

== Second round ==
All the 16 qualified teams from the First Round progressed to the Second Round. The first legs were played on 3 November 2021 and the second legs took place on 17 and 18 November 2021.

Team 1	Agg.	Team 2	1st leg	2nd leg
Korabi (II)	0−3	Teuta (I)	0−1	0−2
Besëlidhja (II)	0−3	Partizani (I)	0−1	0−2
Dinamo Tirana (I)	2−2 (a.e.t.) (8−7 p)	Tirana (I)	2−0	0−2
Bylis (II)	3−3 (a.e.t.) (3−4 p)	Skënderbeu (I)	1−1	2−2
Pogradeci (II)	1−8	Vllaznia (I)	0−2	1−6
Tomori (II)	1−2	Laçi (I)	0−1	1−1
Egnatia (I)	3−2	Kukësi (I)	3−1	0−1
Flamurtari (III)	4−2	Kastrioti (I)	0−0	4−2

3 November 2021	Korabi	0−1	Teuta	Korabi Stadium, Peshkopi
14:00 CET			Vila 43'	Referee: Ditmir Grimci

17 November 2021	Teuta	2−0	Korabi	Olympic Park, Durrës
13:30 CET	Ivanović 12'; Plaku 88'			Referee: Xhulio Agolli

Teuta advanced to the quarter finals.

3 November 2021	Besëlidhja	0−1	Partizani	Brian Filipi Stadium, Lezhë
14:00 CET			Stênio Júnior 8' (pen.)	Referee: Emanuela Rusta

17 November 2021	Partizani	2−0	Besëlidhja	Nexhip Trungu Stadium, Cërrik
13:30 CET	Rrapaj 80'; Stênio Júnior 85'			Referee: Qazim Copa

Partizani advanced to the quarter finals.

3 November 2021	Dinamo Tirana	2−0	Tirana	Arena Kombëtare, Tirana
16:45 CET	Ibraimi 26' (pen.); Skuka 40'			Referee: Florjan Lata

18 November 2021	Tirana	2−0 (a.e.t.) (7−8 p)	Dinamo Tirana	Arena Kombëtare, Tirana
19:45 CET	Gjumsi 35'; Limaj 78' (pen.)			Referee: Eldorjan Hamiti
	Penalties
	Limaj (penalty missed); Ismailgeci (penalty scored); Seferi (penalty scored); Xhixha (penalty missed); Hoti (penalty scored); Totre (penalty scored); Beshiraj (penalty scored); Bekaj (penalty scored); Behiratche (penalty scored); Toshevski (penalty missed)		(penalty scored) Ibraimi; (penalty scored) Mihana; (penalty missed) Gavazaj; (penalty scored) Maliqi; (penalty missed) Demiri; (penalty scored) Imami; (penalty scored) Šofranac; (penalty scored) Bakaj; (penalty scored) Samake; (penalty scored) Daija

Dinamo Tirana advanced to the quarter finals.

3 November 2021	Bylis	1−1	Skënderbeu	Adush Muça Stadium, Ballsh
14:00 CET	Hadroj 1'		Moraes 84'	Referee: Olti Çela

17 November 2021	Skënderbeu	2−2 (a.e.t.) (4−3 p)	Bylis	Skënderbeu Stadium, Korçë
13:30 CET	Meksi 25' (pen.); Berisha 45+2'		Qardaku 15', 72'	Referee: Indrit Myrtja

Skënderbeu advanced to the quarter finals.

3 November 2021	Pogradeci	0−2	Vllaznia	Gjorgji Kyçyku Stadium, Pogradec
14:00 CET			Hoxhaj 1'; Mustedanagić 74'	Referee: Klodjan Prenga

17 November 2021	Vllaznia	6−1	Pogradeci	Loro Boriçi Stadium, Shkodër
13:30 CET	Mustedanagić 3'; Aralica 8', 16'; Latifi 14' (pen.); Pura 24' (o.g.); Hoxhaj 26'		Topllari 56'	Referee: Besnard Kaimi

Vllaznia advanced to the quarter finals.

3 November 2021	Tomori	0−1	Laçi	Tomori Stadium, Berat
14:00 CET			Ademi 32'	Referee: Endrit Zhuli

17 November 2021	Laçi	1−1	Tomori	Internacional Complex, Pezë Helmës
13:30 CET	Guindo 73'		Nako 25'	Referee: Erjon Bylykbashi

Laçi advanced to the quarter finals.

3 November 2021	Egnatia	3−1	Kukësi	Shkumbini Stadium, Peqin
14:00 CET	Imeri 3'; Pedro 37', 63'		Ndreca 66'	Referee: Olsion Yzeiraj

17 November 2021	Kukësi	1−0	Egnatia	Flamurtari Stadium, Vlorë
13:30 CET	Taipi 39' (pen.)			Referee: Kridens Meta

Egnatia advanced to the quarter finals.

3 November 2021	Flamurtari	0−0	Kastrioti	Flamurtari Stadium, Vlorë
14:00 CET				Referee: Klodian Shahini

17 November 2021	Kastrioti	2−4	Flamurtari	Redi Maloku Stadium, Fushë-Krujë
13:30 CET	Karakaçi 13' (pen.); Mudražija 90+7'		Diamanti 38', 90+6'; Pjeshka 67'; Ribaj 90+3'	Referee: Albano Stolaj

Flamurtari advanced to the quarter finals.

== Quarter-finals ==
All eight qualified teams from the second round progressed to the quarter-finals. The first legs were played on 26 and 27 January 2022 and the second legs took place on 9 and 10 February 2022.

Team 1	Agg.	Team 2	1st leg	2nd leg
Skënderbeu (I)	0−2	Teuta (I)	0−1	0−1
Dinamo Tirana (I)	1−2	Partizani (I)	1−1	0−1
Flamurtari (III)	1−3	Vllaznia (I)	1−2	0−1
Egnatia (I)	1−1 (a.e.t.) (2−3 p)	Laçi (I)	1−1	0−0

27 January 2022	Skënderbeu	0−1	Teuta	Skënderbeu Stadium, Korçë
13:45 CET			Hebaj 61'	Referee: Laver Alla

9 February 2022	Teuta	1−0	Skënderbeu	Elbasan Arena, Elbasan
16:45 CET	Hebaj 8' (pen.)			Referee: Blerim Ziri

Teuta advanced to the semi finals.

27 January 2022	Dinamo Tirana	1−1	Partizani	Arena Kombëtare, Tirana
16:45 CET	Ibraimi 43' (pen.)		Cara 24'	Referee: Florjan Lata

10 February 2022	Partizani	1−0	Dinamo Tirana	Arena Kombëtare, Tirana
18:00 CET	Skuka 44'			Referee: Juxhin Xhaja

Partizani advanced to the semi finals.

26 January 2022	Flamurtari	1−2	Vllaznia	Flamurtari Stadium, Vlorë
13:45 CET	Oliveira 75'		Mustedanagić 25', 61'	Referee: Blerim Ziri

10 February 2022	Vllaznia	1−0	Flamurtari	Loro Boriçi Stadium, Shkodër
13:45 CET	Mustedanagić 72'			Referee: Emanuela Rusta

Vllaznia advanced to the semi finals.

26 January 2022	Egnatia	1−1	Laçi	Arena Egnatia, Rrogozhinë
13:45 CET	Imeri 22'		Shehu 17' (pen.)	Referee: Olsid Ferataj

10 February 2022	Laçi	0−0 (a.e.t.) (3−2 p)	Egnatia	Laçi Stadium, Laç
13:45 CET				Referee: Orlando Kuka
	Penalties
	Guindo (penalty scored); Ujka (penalty scored); Velkoski (penalty missed); Mazrekaj (penalty missed); Deliu (penalty scored)		(penalty missed) Lila; (penalty scored) Krivanjeva; (penalty missed) Jackson; (penalty missed) Magani; (penalty scored) Krasniqi

Laçi advanced to the semi finals.

== Semi-finals ==
The first legs were played on 30 and 31 March and the second legs were played on 13 April 2022.

Team 1	Agg.	Team 2	1st leg	2nd leg
Partizani (I)	1−1 (a.e.t.) (4−5 p)	Vllaznia (I)	0−0	1−1
Teuta (I)	2−3	Laçi (I)	1−2	1−1

31 March 2022	Partizani	0−0	Vllaznia	Elbasan Arena, Elbasan
17:45 CEST				Referee: Olsid Ferataj

13 April 2022	Vllaznia	1−1 (a.e.t.) (5−4 p)	Partizani	Loro Boriçi Stadium, Shkodër
17:45 CEST	Aralica 27'		Mala 3'	Referee: Juxhin Xhaja
	Penalties
	Gurishta (penalty scored); Hoxhaj (penalty scored); Adili (penalty scored); Gjurgjevikj (penalty scored); Latifi (penalty scored)		(penalty missed) Skuka; (penalty scored) Massanga; (penalty scored) Hoxha; (penalty scored) Mirosavljev; (penalty scored) Murataj

Vllaznia advanced to the final.

30 March 2022	Teuta	1−2	Laçi	Niko Dovana Stadium, Durrës
17:45 CEST	Todorovski 90+3'		Ujka 6'; Akinyemi 58'	Referee: Olsion Yzeiraj

13 April 2022	Laçi	1−1	Teuta	Laçi Stadium, Laç
14:45 CEST	Akinyemi 44'		Hebaj 15'	Referee: Kreshnik Cjapi

Laçi advanced to the final.

== Final ==
31 May 2022
19:00 CEST

Vllaznia	2−1 (a.e.t.)	Laçi
Hoxhaj 18'; Adili 95'		Guindo 4'

Arena Kombëtare, Tirana
Referee: Juxhin Xhaja
