= 2024–25 FC Oleksandriya season =

Oleksandriya
2024–25 season
- Honorary president: Serhiy Kuzmenko
- General director: Ivan Kuzmenko
- Manager: Ruslan Rotan
- Stadium: CSC Nika Stadium
- Ukrainian Premier League: 2nd
- Ukrainian Cup: Quarter-finals
- Top goalscorer: League: Oleksandr Filippov (10); All: Oleksandr Filippov (10)
Home colours	Away colours

The 2024–25 season was FC Oleksandriya's 34th season in existence and the club's 10th season after return to the top flight of Ukrainian football. In addition to the domestic league, Oleksandriy participated in that season's edition of the Ukrainian Cup. The season covers the period from 1 July 2024 to 30 June 2025.

== Players ==
=== First team squad ===
Squad at end of season

Note: Flags indicate national team as defined under FIFA eligibility rules; some limited exceptions apply. Players may hold more than one non-FIFA nationality.

No.	Pos.	Nation	Player
1	GK	UKR	Viktor Dolhyi
2	DF	UKR	Illya Ukhan
3	DF	UKR	Yuriy Matviiv
4	DF	UKR	Mykyta Kravchenko
5	MF	UKR	Ivan Kalyuzhnyi
6	MF	UKR	Kyrylo Kovalets (captain)
8	MF	UKR	Serhiy Buletsa
9	FW	UKR	Oleksandr Filippov
10	FW	UKR	Andriy Kulakov
11	FW	UKR	Artem Shulyanskyi
14	MF	UKR	Maksym Radchenko
15	MF	UKR	Dmytro Myshnyov
16	DF	FRA	Théo Ndicka
17	FW	UKR	Yaroslav Bazayev
18	DF	UKR	Serhiy Lohinov
19	MF	UKR	Volodymyr Shepelyev
20	MF	UKR	Daniil Vashchenko
21	MF	UKR	Oleksandr Byelyayev
22	DF	UKR	Danil Skorko

No.	Pos.	Nation	Player
23	FW	BRA	Geovani
24	DF	UKR	Oleksandr Martynyuk
26	DF	POR	Miguel Campos
27	FW	ALB	Tedi Cara
30	MF	UKR	Yuriy Kopyna
31	DF	UKR	Artem Shabanov
33	FW	BRA	Juan Alvina
40	MF	UKR	Dmytro Chernysh
44	GK	UKR	Heorhiy Yermakov (on loan from Maccabi Haifa)
49	MF	BRA	Mateus Amaral
55	MF	UKR	Yevheniy Smyrnyi
59	MF	UKR	Artem Kozak
71	MF	UKR	Denys Shostak
72	GK	UKR	Nazar Makarenko
77	GK	UKR	Mykyta Shevchenko
80	MF	UKR	Matviy Malko
86	DF	UKR	Anton Bol
99	MF	UKR	Simon Haloyan

=== Left during the season ===
Note: Flags indicate national team as defined under FIFA eligibility rules; some limited exceptions apply. Players may hold more than one non-FIFA nationality.

No.	Pos.	Nation	Player
8	MF	UKR	Denys Kostyshyn (to Drita)
19	MF	UKR	Rodion Plaksa (to Bukovyna Chernivtsi)

No.	Pos.	Nation	Player
27	MF	UKR	Artur Avahimyan (to LNZ Cherkasy)
88	FW	UKR	Vladyslav Pohorilyi (to Rukh Lviv)

== Club Friendlies ==
12 July 2024 Friendly	Oleksandriya (Ukraine)	3–1	(Ukraine) Nyva Buzova	Oleksandriia
11:00 EET	Juan Alvina 24'; Pohorilyi 53'; Shostak 79'	Report	Rohozynskyi 9'	Stadium: CSC Nika Stadium

17 July 2024 Friendly	LNZ Cherkasy (Ukraine)	2–1	(Ukraine) Oleksandriya	Lebedyn
19:00 EET	Assinor 33', 50'	Report	Campos 87'	Stadium: LNZ-Аrena

27 July 2024 Friendly	Oleksandriya (Ukraine)	2–0	(Ukraine) Chornomorets Odesa	Oleksandriia
11:30 EET		Report		Stadium: CSC Nika Stadium

27 July 2024 Friendly	Oleksandriya (Ukraine)	2–2	(Ukraine) Mariupol	Oleksandriia
15:00 EET		Report		Stadium: CSC Nika Stadium

7 September 2024 Friendly	Oleksandriya (Ukraine)	1–1	(Ukraine) Inhulets Petrove	Oleksandriia
12:00 EET		Report		Stadium: CSC Nika Stadium

13 October 2024 Friendly	Oleksandriya (Ukraine)	4–2	(Ukraine) Kryvbas Kryvyi Rih	Oleksandriia
14:00 EET		Report		Stadium: CSC Nika Stadium

20 January 2025 Friendly	Oleksandriya (Ukraine)	3–0	(Georgia (country)) Dinamo Batumi
16:00 EET	Skorko 29'; Kozak 46'; Byelyayev 53'	Report

24 January 2025 Friendly	Baník Ostrava (Czech Republic)	2–0	(Ukraine) Oleksandriya	Belek
16:00 EET	Rigo 44' (pen.); Kohút 82'	Report		Stadium: Gloria Sports Arena

28 January 2025 Friendly	First Vienna (Austria)	2–1	(Ukraine) Oleksandriya	Belek
10:00 EET	Edelhofer 65'; Boateng 90' (pen.)	Report	Smyrnyi 75'	Stadium: Arcadia Futbol Kompleksi - Field 1

28 January 2025 Friendly	Oleksandriya (Ukraine)	1–1	(Slovakia) DAC 1904 Dunajská Streda	Belek
16:30 EET	Kalyuzhnyi (yellow card) 32'; Filippov 34'; Skorko (yellow card) 41'; Myshnyov (yellow card) 77'; Cara (yellow card) 85'	Report	Tuboly (yellow card) 8'; Alex Méndez (yellow card) 23'; Herc 27'; Yapi (yellow card) 36'; Bajo (yellow card) 89'	Stadium: Gloria Sports Arena

4 February 2025 Friendly	Wisła Płock (Poland)	0–3	(Ukraine) Oleksandriya	Belek
10:00 EET		Report	Haloyan 50'; Kozak 74'; Kulakov 81'	Stadium: Gloria Sports Arena

5 February 2025 Friendly	Oleksandriya (Ukraine)	2–0	(Denmark) Fredericia	Belek
10:30 EET		Report		Stadium: Gloria Sports Arena

8 February 2025 Friendly	Oleksandriya (Ukraine)	4–0	(Germany) SGV Freiberg	Belek
10:00 EET		Report		Stadium: Gloria Sports Arena

8 February 2025 Friendly	Oleksandriya (Ukraine)	2–3	(Latvia) Liepāja	Belek
16:00 EET		Report		Stadium: Gloria Golf Resort Pitch B

12 February 2025 Friendly	Oleksandriya (Ukraine)	2–2	(Moldova) Petrocub Hîncești	Belek
10:00 EET	Skorko 80'; Kopyna 90'	Report	Lungu 23'; Căruntu 30'	Stadium: Gloria Sports Arena

12 February 2025 Friendly	Oleksandriya (Ukraine)	3–1	(Georgia (country)) Iberia 1999
16:30 EET	Juan Alvina 23'; Filippov 26', 41'	Report	90'

15 February 2025 Friendly	Oleksandriya (Ukraine)	1–3	(Latvia) Riga	Belek
16:00 EET	Kalyuzhnyi 43'	Report	Jurkovskis 52'; Iago Siqueira 69'; Musah 85'	Stadium: Gloria Sports Arena

== Competitions ==
=== Premier League ===
==== League table ====
Pos	Team	Pld	W	D	L	GF	GA	GD	Pts	Qualification or relegation
1	Dynamo Kyiv (C)	30	20	10	0	61	19	+42	70	Qualification for the Champions League second qualifying round
2	Oleksandriya	30	20	7	3	46	22	+24	67	Qualification for the Conference League second qualifying round
3	Shakhtar Donetsk	30	18	8	4	69	26	+43	62	Qualification for the Europa League first qualifying round (Note: Shakhtar Donetsk qualified for the Europa League first qualifying round by winning the 2024–25 Ukrainian Cup; the second Conference League spot was passed to the fourth-placed team.)
4	Polissya Zhytomyr	30	12	12	6	38	28	+10	48	Qualification for the Conference League second qualifying round
5	Kryvbas Kryvyi Rih	30	13	8	9	34	26	+8	47	

Source: upl.ua
Rules for classification: 1) Points; 2) Head-to-head points; 3) Head-to-head goal difference; 4) Head-to-head goals scored; 5) Goal difference; 6) Goals scored; 7) Draw or "Golden match" if two teams tied for title (Article 22, paragraph 3).
(C) Champions
Notes:

Teams that placed 13th and 14th in the 2024–25 Ukrainian Premier League played two-leg play-off with the third and fourth teams of the 2024–25 Ukrainian First League. As a result, both the Ukrainian First League teams (Metalist 1925 and Kudrivka) received promotion after beating the Ukrainian Premier League teams (Vorskla and Livyi Bereh), which in turn were relegated. Due to the Russian 2025 summer escalation and the Russian ballistic missile attack warnings, on 1 June 2025, both matches were suspended but later renewed.

Team 1	Agg.	Team 2	1st leg	2nd leg
Kudrivka	2–2 (4–3 p)	Vorskla Poltava	1–2	1–0
Livyi Bereh Kyiv	0–2	Metalist 1925 Kharkiv	0–1	0–1

=== First Semi-final ===
29 May 2025	Kudrivka	1–2	Vorskla Poltava	Kyiv
15:30	Kozak 83'	Report	Ndukve 23'; Pavlyuk 39'	Stadium: Obolon Arena; Attendance: 1,100; Referee: Dmytro Panchyshyn (Kharkiv)

1 June 2025	Vorskla Poltava	0–1 (3–4 p)	Kudrivka	Poltava
13:00		Report	Lytovchenko 9'	Stadium: Vorskla; Attendance: 2,204; Referee: Mykola Balakin (Kyiv oblast)
	Penalties
	Ndukve (penalty scored); Malysh (penalty scored); Iyede (penalty missed); Kane (penalty missed); Salabay (penalty scored); Sklyar (penalty missed)		(penalty scored) Tuzenko; (penalty missed) Storchous; (penalty scored) Shershen; (penalty scored) Potimkov; (penalty missed) Serdyuk; (penalty scored) Liehostayev

2–2 on aggregate; Kudrivka won 4–3 on penalties and promotion to Premier League. While, Vorskla lost 3–4 on penalties and relegation to First League

=== Second Semi-final ===
29 May 2025	Livyi Bereh Kyiv	0–1	Metalist 1925 Kharkiv	Hnidyn, Kyiv Oblast
18:00		Report	Moura 38'	Stadium: Arena Livyi Bereh; Attendance: 1,167; Referee: Viktor Kopiyevskyi (Kropyvnytskyi)

1 June 2025	Metalist 1925 Kharkiv	1–0	Livyi Bereh Kyiv	Hnidyn, Kyiv Oblast
15:30	Kalitvintsev 90'	Report		Stadium: Arena Livyi Bereh; Attendance: 1,800; Referee: Vitaliy Romanov (Dnipro)

Metalist 1925 Kharkiv won 2–0 on aggregate and promotion to Premier League. While, Livyi Bereh Kyiv lost 0–2 on aggregate and relegation to First League.

==== Results summary ====
Overall								Home						Away					
Pld	W	D	L	GF	GA	GD	Pts	W	D	L	GF	GA	GD	W	D	L	GF	GA	GD
21	14	5	2	33	16	+17	47	10	3	0	26	8	+18	4	2	2	7	8	−1

Last updated: 11 March 2025.
Source: soccerway

==== Results by round ====
Round	1	2	3	4	5	6	7	8	9	10	11	12	13	14	15	16	17	18	19	20	21	22
Ground	H	A	A	H	H	A	H	A	H	H	H	H	H	A	H	A	H	H	A	A	H	A
Result	D	W	W	W	W	D	W	W	D	W	W	W	W	D	W	L	D	W	L	W	W	
Position	10	4	2	2	2	3	2	2	3	2	2	2	2	2	2	2	2	2	2	2	2	

Updated to match(es) played on 11 March 2025. Source: worldfootball
A = Away; H = Home; W = Win; D = Draw; L = Loss

==== Matches ====
12 August 2024 2	LNZ Cherkasy	0–2	Oleksandriya	Cherkasy
15:30 EET	Pasich (yellow card) 76'	Report	Kovalets 58'; Juan Alvina (yellow card) 61' (goal) 73'; Smyrnyi (yellow card) 79'; Shabanov (yellow card) 87'	Stadium: Cherkasy Arena; Attendance: 280; Referee: Denys Reznikov

17 August 2024 3	Zorya Luhansk	1–2	Oleksandriya	Kyiv
13:30 EET	Nwaeze (yellow card) 30'; Jordan 50'; Dryshlyuk (yellow card) 85'; Yatsyk (yellow card) 90+4'	Report	Juan Alvina 23'; Kovalets 32'	Stadium: Valeriy Lobanovskyi Dynamo Stadium; Attendance: 457; Referee: Volodymyr Novokhatniy

24 August 2024 4	Oleksandriya	4–3	Shakhtar Donetsk	Oleksandriia
13:00 EET	Filippov 37', 48' (pen.), 57'; Kalyuzhnyi 42'; Vashchenko (yellow card) 63'; Skorko (yellow card)	Report	Shabanov 16' (o.g.); Kryskiv 25'; Matviyenko (yellow card) 53'; Pedrinho 90+5'; Kevin (yellow card)	Stadium: CSC Nika Stadium; Attendance: 1,180; Referee: Vitaliy Romanov

31 August 2024 5	Oleksandriya	2–1	Kolos Kovalivka	Oleksandriia
15:30 EET	Kovalets 15'; Geovani 73'; Kalyuzhnyi (yellow card) 78'; Smyrnyi (yellow card) 83'	Report	Veleten (yellow card) 10'; Tsurikov (yellow card) 24'; Husol 76'; Kryvoruchko (yellow card) 79'	Stadium: CSC Nika Stadium; Attendance: 1,108; Referee: Klym Zabroda

13 September 2024 6	Obolon Kyiv	0–0	Oleksandriya	Kyiv
18:00 EET	Vitenchuk (yellow card) 58'; Medynskyi (yellow card) 76'	Report	Filippov (yellow card) 31'; Martynyuk (yellow card) 57'	Stadium: Obolon Arena; Attendance: 1,250; Referee: Oleksandr Omelchenko

21 September 2024 7	Oleksandriya	2–0	Livyi Bereh Kyiv	Oleksandriia
15:30 EET	Campos 53'; Shabanov 67'; Skorko (yellow card) 89'	Report	Sukhoruchko (yellow card) 44' (yellow-red card) 45+1'; Banada (yellow card) 54'; Semenov (yellow card) 86'	Stadium: CSC Nika Stadium; Attendance: 1,018; Referee: Denys Shurman

28 September 2024 8	Kryvbas Kryvyi Rih	0–1	Oleksandriya	Kryvyi Rih
13:00 EET	Bizimana (yellow card) 22'; Mykytyshyn (yellow card) 34'; Bandeira (yellow card) 90+3'	Report	Kalyuzhnyi (yellow card) 18'; Filippov 45+1'; Smyrnyi (yellow card) 50'	Stadium: Hirnyk Stadium; Attendance: 480; Referee: Oleh Derevinskyi

5 October 2024 9	Oleksandriya	1–1	Rukh Lviv	Oleksandriia
15:30 EET	Filippov 88' (yellow card) 88'; Campos (yellow card) 90+7'	Report	Pidhurskyi (yellow card) 17'; Kvasnytsya (yellow card) 77'; Roman (yellow card) 79'; Krasnopir 90+9' (pen.)	Stadium: CSC Nika Stadium; Attendance: 1,180; Referee: Dmytro Panchyshyn

19 October 2024 10	Oleksandriya	1–0	Vorskla Poltava	Oleksandriia
13:30 EET	Kalyuzhnyi (yellow card) 5'; Byelyayev 58'; Shostak (yellow card) 90+2'	Report	Chelyadin (yellow card) 26'; Sklyar (yellow card) 63'; Isenko (yellow card) 88'	Stadium: CSC Nika Stadium; Attendance: 730; Referee: Oleksandr Omelchenko

26 October 2024 11	Oleksandriya	2–1	Inhulets Petrove	Oleksandriia
13:00 EET	Juan Alvina 17'; Myshnyov 29' (yellow card) 64'	Report	Pyatov 21'	Stadium: CSC Nika Stadium; Attendance: 861; Referee: Volodymyr Novokhatniy

3 November 2024 12	Oleksandriya	1–0	Polissya Zhytomyr	Oleksandriia
15:30 EET	Kovalets (yellow card) 69'; Smyrnyi 83'; Martynyuk (yellow card) 85'	Report	Nazarenko (yellow card) 25'; Smolyakov (yellow card) 59'; Babenko (yellow card) 74'; Sarapiy (yellow card) 90+1'	Stadium: CSC Nika Stadium; Attendance: 1,180; Referee: Oleksandr Shandor

9 November 2024 13	Oleksandriya	3–0	Karpaty Lviv	Oleksandriia
15:30 EET	Campos 36', 54' (pen.), 87' (pen.)	Report	Álvarez (yellow card) 44'	Stadium: CSC Nika Stadium; Attendance: 895; Referee: Mykola Balakin

24 November 2024 14	Veres Rivne	1–1	Oleksandriya	Lutsk
17:00 EET	Hayduchyk 27'; Vovchenko (yellow card) 61'; Sharay (yellow card) 65'; Shevchenko (yellow card) 76'; Stepanyuk (yellow card) 80'; Protasevych (yellow card) 83'	Report	Campos (yellow card) 71'; Juan Alvina 78'; Kalyuzhnyi (yellow card) 89'	Stadium: Avanhard Stadium; Attendance: 1,486; Referee: Andriy Kovalenko

1 December 2024 15	Oleksandriya	3–0	Chornomorets Odesa	Oleksandriia
13:00 EET	Vashchenko 16'; Juan Alvina (yellow card) 57'; Kostyshyn 79'; Kozak 90+1'	Report	Rudko (yellow card) 16'; Petryak (red card) 17'; Butko (yellow card) 20' (red card) 30'; Khoblenko (yellow card) 56'; Caio Gomes (yellow card) 78'	Stadium: CSC Nika Stadium; Attendance: 865; Referee: Oleksandr Omelchenko

4 December 2024 1	Oleksandriya	0–0	Dynamo Kyiv	Oleksandriia
15:30 EET	Kravchenko (yellow card) 57'	Report	Brazhko (yellow card) 90+3'	Stadium: CSC Nika Stadium; Attendance: 1,180; Referee: Vitaliy Romanov

8 December 2024 16	Dynamo Kyiv	3–0	Oleksandriya	Kyiv
18:00 EET	Popov 36'; Vanat 42' 55'	Report	Campos (yellow card) 54'	Stadium: Valeriy Lobanovskyi Dynamo Stadium; Attendance: 1,733; Referee: Oleksandr Afanasyev

14 December 2024 17	Oleksandriya	1–1	LNZ Cherkasy	Oleksandriia
13:00 EET	Filippov 45+2'; Kalyuzhnyi (yellow card) 81'	Report	Jashari (yellow card) 45+2' (goal) 65'	Stadium: CSC Nika Stadium; Attendance: 657; Referee: Denys Shurman

23 February 2025 18	Oleksandriya	2–1	Zorya Luhansk	Oleksandriia
15:30 EET	Filippov 45+1', 47'; Yermakov (yellow card) 90+1'	Report	Mićin (yellow card) 15'; Vantukh 43'; Vakula (yellow card) 68'	Stadium: CSC Nika Stadium; Attendance: 695; Referee: Maksym Kozyryatskyi

1 March 2025 19	Shakhtar Donetsk	3–0	Oleksandriya	Lviv
18:00 EET	Kevin (yellow card) 56'; Matviyenko (yellow card) 63'; Sudakov 77', 90+4'; Eguinaldo 90'	Report	Kalyuzhnyi (yellow card) 52'; Myshnyov (yellow card) 69'	Stadium: Arena Lviv; Attendance: 1,320; Referee: Mykola Balakin

7 March 2025 20	Kolos Kovalivka	0–1	Oleksandriya	Kovalivka
15:30 EET	Tsurikov (yellow card) 36'	Report	Shepelyev 42'	Stadium: Kolos Stadium; Attendance: 459; Referee: Oleksandr Shandor

11 March 2025 21	Oleksandriya	4–0	Obolon Kyiv	Oleksandriya
13:00 EET	Filippov 13', 44'; Juan Alvina 16'; Kalyuzhnyi (yellow card) 61'; Ndicka 90'	Report		Stadium: CSC Nika Stadium; Attendance: 581; Referee: Ihor Paskhal

29 March 2025 22	Livyi Bereh Kyiv	0–1	Oleksandriya	Kyiv Oblast
13:00 EET		Report	Smyrnyi 13'	Stadium: Arena Livyi Bereh; Attendance: 962; Referee: Volodymyr Novokhatniy

6 April 2025 23	Oleksandriya	1–0	Kryvbas Kryvyi Rih	Oleksandriya
13:00 EET	Cara (yellow card) 56'; Juan Alvina 57'; Kravchenko (yellow card) 79'; Kalyuzhnyi (yellow card) 84'	Report	Konaté (yellow card) 90+2'	Stadium: CSC Nika Stadium; Attendance: 1,014; Referee: Oleksandr Shandor

12 April 2025 24	Rukh Lviv	1–1	Oleksandriya	Lviv
15:30 EET (UTC+2)	Edson Fernando (yellow card) 64'; Faal 66'	Report	Myshnyov 43'; Campos (yellow card) 49'; Shostak (yellow card) 83'; Martynyuk (yellow card) 85'	Stadium: Arena Lviv; Attendance: 900; Referee: Oleksandr Afanasyev

18 April 2025 25	Vorskla Poltava	1–3	Oleksandriya	Poltava
13:00 EET	Chelyadin (yellow card) 72'; Ndukve 75'; Batsula (yellow card) 82'	Report	Kovalets 7'; Cara 36', 45+1'; Kravchenko (yellow card) 59'	Stadium: Oleksiy Butovsky Vorskla Stadium; Attendance: 2,095; Referee: Roman Blavatskyi

25 April 2025 26	Inhulets Petrove	0–1	Oleksandriya	Oleksandriya
15:30 EET	Farasyeyenko (yellow card) 47'; Katrych (yellow card) 56'; Dykhtyaruk (yellow card) 76'	Report	Cara 27'; Campos (yellow card) 43'; Kozak (yellow card) 71'	Stadium: CSC Nika Stadium; Attendance: 726; Referee: Oleksandr Kalyonov

4 May 2025 27	Polissya Zhytomyr	1–2	Oleksandriya	Zhytomyr
18:00 EET (UTC+2)	Maisuradze (yellow card) 35' (yellow-red card) 51'; Batista 45+1'; Andriyevskyi (yellow card) 90+4'	Report	Kalyuzhnyi 32'; Martynyuk (yellow card) 56'; Cara 78'; Shabanov (yellow card) 90+4'	Stadium: Tsentralnyi Stadion; Attendance: 2,500; Referee: Mykola Balakin

11 May 2025 28	Karpaty Lviv	v	Oleksandriya	Lviv
18:00 EET (UTC+2)		Report		Stadium: Ukraina Stadium

17 May 2025 29	Oleksandriya	v	Veres Rivne
EET		Report

24 May 2025 30	Chornomorets Odesa	v	Oleksandriya
EET (UTC+2)		Report

=== Ukrainian Cup ===
30 October 2024 Round of 16	UCSA Tarasivka	1–4	Oleksandriya	Kyiv
13:00 EET	Debelko 48' (yellow card) 75'; Yuvkhymets (yellow card) 86'	Report	Plaksa 8', 39'; Kozak 23'; Skorko 36'; Kopyna (yellow card) 66'	Stadium: Bannikov Stadium; Attendance: 270; Referee: Oleksandr Kalyonov

2 April 2025 Quarter-finals	Oleksandriya	0–1 (a.e.t.)	Shakhtar Donetsk	Oleksandriia
14:00 EEST (UTC+3)	Campos (yellow card) 51'; Myshnyov (yellow card) 55'; Kalyuzhnyi (yellow card) 83'; Juan Alvina (yellow card) 84'; Smyrnyi (yellow card) 109'	Report	Pedro Henrique (yellow card) 7'; Nazaryna (yellow card) 24'; Pedrinho (yellow card) 36'; Kevin (yellow card) 54' (goal) 109'; Bondar (yellow card) 90'; Matviyenko (yellow card) 93'; Traoré (yellow card) 98'	Stadium: CSC Nika Stadium; Attendance: 1,180; Referee: Mykola Balakin
