= Vangjeli =

Vangjeli is an Albanian surname. Notable people with the surname include:

- Kosta Vangjeli (born 2000), Greek–born Albanian footballer
- Kristi Vangjeli (born 1985), Albanian footballer
- Vasillaq Vangjeli (1948–2011), Albanian actor and comedian
