= Hryhoriy Ishchenko =

Soviet footballer and coach (born 1946)

Personal information
- Full name: Hryhoriy Andriyovych Ishchenko
- Date of birth: 29 July 1946 (age 80)
- Place of birth: Kirovohrad, Ukrainian SSR, Soviet Union
- Height: 1.73 m (5 ft 8 in)
- Position: Defender

Senior career*
Years	Team	Apps	(Gls)
1964–1965	FC Shakhtar Oleksandriya	8	(3)
1965–1967	FC Dynamo Kyiv	0	(0)
1968	FC Zirka Kirovohrad	20	(0)
1969	FC Avanhard Zhovti Vody		
1969–1971	FC Shakhtar Kadiivka	20+	(4+)
1972–1973	FC Dynamo Khmelnytskyi	?	(18)
1973–1976	FC Sudnobudivnyk Mykolaiv	102	(9)

Managerial career
- 1977–1979: FC Sudnobudivnyk Mykolaiv (academy)
- 1979–1982: FC Sudnobudivnyk Mykolaiv
- 1982: FC Podillya Khmelnytskyi
- 1983–1985: FC Podillya Khmelnytskyi (ass't)
- 1985: FC Podillya Khmelnytskyi
- 1987: FC Zirka Kirovohrad
- 1991–1992: FC Podillya Khmelnytskyi
- 1993: FC Karpaty Mukacheve
- 1994: FC Advis Khmelnytskyi
- 1996–1997: FC Polissya Zhytomyr
- 1997–2003: FC Polihraftekhnika Oleksandriya (ass't)
- 1998: FC Polihraftekhnika Oleksandriya (interim)
- 1999: FC Polihraftekhnika Oleksandriya (interim)
- 2003: FC Nyva Vinnytsia (ass't)
- 2003–2004: MFC Mykolaiv (ass't)
- 2004–2005: MFC Mykolaiv
- * Club domestic league appearances and goals

Hryhoriy Ishchenko (Ukrainian: Григорій Андрійович Іщенко; 29 July 1946) is a former professional Soviet football defender and later Soviet and Ukrainian coach.

Starting at the sports school in Kropyvnytskyi (at that time Kirovohrad), over his playing career Ishchenko played for Soviet lower leagues' clubs. After becoming a head coach, Ishchenko managed quite few professional clubs in Ukraine.

Ishchenko's son Ihor Ishchenko is a former Ukrainian football referee.
