= Konstantin Sosenko =

Turkemnistani footballer (born 1960)

Personal information
- Full name: Konstantin Fedorovich Sosenko
- Date of birth: 26 September 1969 (age 57)
- Place of birth: Sokolivske, Kirovohrad Raion, Kirovohrad Oblast, Ukrainian SSR
- Position: Defender

Senior career*
Years	Team	Apps	(Gls)
1986–1991	Zirka Kirovohrad	101	(1)
1992–1995	Polihraftekhnika Oleksandriya	123	(0)
1995–1996	Nyva Vinnytsia	42	(0)
1996–1998	Dnipro Dnipropetrovsk	31	(0)
1997	Metalurh Novomoskovsk	10	(0)
1997	CSKA Kyiv	11	(0)
1998–1999	Borysfen Boryspil	24	(0)
1999–2000	Spartak Ivano-Frankivsk	32	(0)
2000–2001	Pakhtakor	20	(0)

International career
1998	Turkmenistan	6	(0)
- * Club domestic league appearances and goals

Konstantin Fedorovich Sosenko (born 26 September 1969) is a former footballer who played as a defender. Born in Ukraine, he was a Turkmenistan international.

== Club career ==
Sosenko started his career with Ukrainian side FC Zirka Kropyvnytskyi. In 1992, he signed for Ukrainian side FC Oleksandriya.

== International career ==
Sosenko was a Turkmenistan international. He helped the Turkmenistan national football team achieve the quarter-finals of the 1998 Asian Games.

== Post-playing career ==
After retiring from professional football, Sosenko worked as a football agent. He was one of eight football agents in Ukraine in the early 2000s.

== Personal life ==
Sosenko has been married. He has a daughter.
