= Miguel Campos =

Portuguese footballer

Miguel Ferreira
Personal information
- Full name: Miguel Ferreira Campos
- Date of birth: 19 August 1996 (age 30)
- Place of birth: Fermentelos, Portugal
- Height: 1.88 m (6 ft 2 in)
- Position: Centre-back

Team information
- Current team: Shanghai Port
- Number: 44

Youth career
- 2004–2010: Fermentelos
- 2010–2015: Beira-Mar

Senior career*
Years	Team	Apps	(Gls)
2014–2016	Beira-Mar	4	(0)
2015	→ Gafanha (loan)	7	(0)
2016	→ GD Oliveira Frades (loan)	11	(0)
2016–2017	Oliveira do Bairro	31	(6)
2017–2018	Sacavenense B	1	(0)
2018–2019	Olhanense	20	(0)
2019–2020	Águeda	17	(0)
2020–2021	Benfica e Castelo Branco	25	(2)
2021–2022	Anadia	24	(0)
2021–2022	Anadia B	4	(2)
2022–2024	Rudeš	33	(0)
2024–2026	Oleksandriya	62	(6)
2026–	Shanghai Port	0	(0)
- * Club domestic league appearances and goals as of 3 June 2026

Miguel Ferreira Campos (born 19 August 1996) is a Portuguese professional footballer who plays as a centre-back for Chinese Super League club Shanghai Port.

== Career ==
On 17 January 2024, Ferreira moved from Croatian Football League club Rudeš to Ukrainian Premier League side Oleksandriya, where he signed a two-and-a-half-year contract.

On 23 July 2026, Ferreira joined Chinese Super League club Shanghai Port as AFC Champions League foreign player.
