= Serhiy Buletsa =

Ukrainian footballer

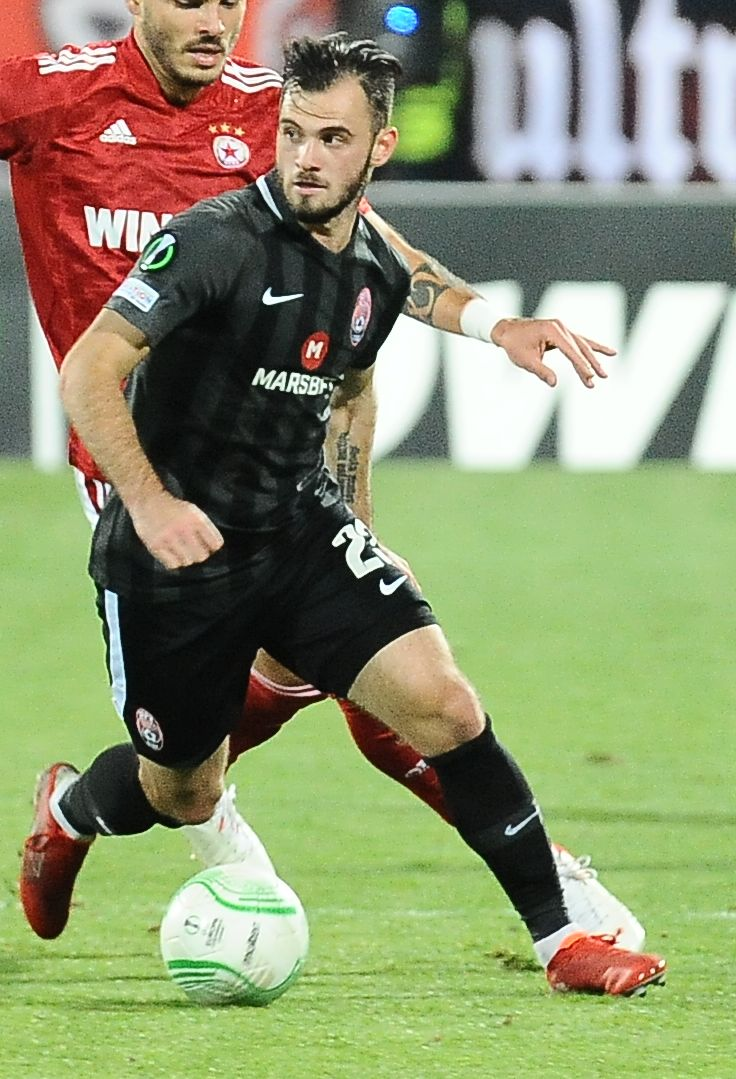

Personal information
- Full name: Serhiy Anatoliyovych Buletsa
- Date of birth: 16 February 1999 (age 27)
- Place of birth: Korytniany, Zakarpattia Oblast, Ukraine
- Height: 1.72 m (5 ft 8 in)
- Position: Attacking midfielder

Team information
- Current team: Oleksandriya
- Number: 8

Youth career
- 2012–2013: SDYuSShOR Uzhhorod
- 2014–2015: RVUFK Kyiv
- 2015–2016: Dynamo Kyiv

Senior career*
Years	Team	Apps	(Gls)
2016–2025	Dynamo Kyiv	0	(0)
2019–2021	→ Dnipro-1 (loan)	46	(7)
2021–2023	→ Zorya Luhansk (loan)	44	(9)
2023–2024	→ Zagłębie Lubin (loan)	28	(1)
2023	→ Zagłębie Lubin II (loan)	1	(0)
2024–2025	→ Lechia Gdańsk (loan)	7	(0)
2025–	Oleksandriya	27	(1)

International career
2015–2016	Ukraine U17	9	(4)
2016–2017	Ukraine U18	2	(0)
2017–2018	Ukraine U19	17	(3)
2018–2019	Ukraine U20	10	(4)
2019–2020	Ukraine U21	8	(1)
2021	Ukraine	3	(0)
Medal record
Men's football
Representing Ukraine
UEFA European Under-19 Championship
Bronze medal – third place	2018 Finland
FIFA U-20 World Cup
Winner	2019 Poland
- * Club domestic league appearances and goals as of 3 June 2026

Serhiy Anatoliyovych Buletsa (Ukrainian: Сергій Анатолійович Булеца; born 16 February 1999) is a Ukrainian professional footballer who plays as an attacking midfielder for Ukrainian Premier League club Oleksandriya.

== Career ==
Born in Zakarpattia Oblast, Buletsa is a product of Uzhhorod and Kyiv football academies among which are RVUFK Kyiv and Dynamo Kyiv.

He played for Dynamo in the Ukrainian Premier League Reserves (U-21 and U-19 competitions) and in April 2019 he was promoted to the senior squad team. Buletsa was sat on the bench for the away game with Mariupol in the Ukrainian Premier League on 13 April 2019, but did not make an appearance.

On 26 June 2019, Buletsa was loaned to Dnipro-1 for the 2019–20 season. On 31 July 2019, in his Ukrainian Premier League debut against Olimpik Donetsk, Buletsa scored after only two minutes. That goal was also the first ever Ukrainian Premier League goal for Dnipro-1. On 31 August 2020, his loan was prolonged for another season.

== International career ==
Buletsa was part of the Ukraine national under-20 football team that won the 2019 FIFA U-20 World Cup. He played a key role in Ukraine's success, appearing in all 7 of his team's matches and scoring 3 goals. At the end of the tournament, Buletsa received the Silver Ball, awarded to the second best player of the tournament.

He made his senior national team debut on 8 September 2021 in a friendly against the Czech Republic, a 1–1 away draw.

== Career statistics ==
=== Club ===
As of match played 30 November 2024

Appearances and goals by club, season and competition
Club	Season	League			National cup (Note: Includes Ukrainian Cup, Polish Cup)		Continental		Other		Total	
Club	Season	Division	Apps	Goals	Apps	Goals	Apps	Goals	Apps	Goals	Apps	Goals
Dnipro-1 (loan)	2019–20	Ukrainian Premier League	27	4	2	1	—		—		29	5
Dnipro-1 (loan)	2020–21	Ukrainian Premier League	19	3	3	2	—		—		22	5
Dnipro-1 (loan)	Total		46	7	5	3	—		—		51	10
Zorya Luhansk (loan)	2021–22	Ukrainian Premier League	16	2	1	0	7 (Note: Two appearances in UEFA Europa League, five appearances in UEFA Europa Conference League)	0	—		24	2
Zorya Luhansk (loan)	2022–23	Ukrainian Premier League	28	7	0	0	2 (Note: Appearances in UEFA Europa Conference League)	0	—		30	7
Zorya Luhansk (loan)	Total		44	9	1	0	9	0	—		54	9
Zagłębie Lubin (loan)	2023–24	Ekstraklasa	28	1	1	0	—		—		29	1
Zagłębie Lubin II (loan)	2023–24	II liga	1	0	0	0	—		—		1	0
Lechia Gdańsk (loan)	2024–25	Ekstraklasa	7	0	1	0	—		—		8	0
Oleksandriya	2024–25	Ukrainian Premier League	0	0	0	0	—		—		0	0
Career total			126	17	8	3	9	0	0	0	143	20

=== International ===
Appearances and goals by national team and year
National team	Year	Apps	Goals
Ukraine
Ukraine	2021	3	0
Total		3	0

== Honours ==
Ukraine U20

- FIFA U-20 World Cup: 2019

Individual

- FIFA U-20 World Cup Silver Ball: 2019
