= Daniil Vashchenko =

Ukrainian footballer

Personal information
- Full name: Daniil Oleksandrovych Vashchenko
- Date of birth: 2 October 2005 (age 21)
- Place of birth: Artemivsk, Ukraine
- Height: 1.78 m (5 ft 10 in)
- Position: Midfielder

Team information
- Current team: FC Epitsentr Kamianets-Podilskyi
- Number: 20

Youth career
- 2017–2022: Piddubny Olympic College
- 2022–2023: Oleksandriya

Senior career*
Years	Team	Apps	(Gls)
2023– 27	Oleksandriya	42	(1)
2024–26	→ Oleksandriya-2	10	(2)
= 2026-	FC Epitsentr Kamianets-Podilskyi	3	(0)

International career^{‡}
2023–2024	Ukraine U19	12	(0)
2025	Ukraine U20	8	(0)
2025–	Ukraine U21	1	(0)
- * Club domestic league appearances and goals as of 20/9/26 @ 14:30(AEST) ‡ National team caps and goals as of 17 November 2025

Daniil Oleksandrovych Vashchenko (Ukrainian: Данііл Олександрович Ващенко; born 2 October 2005) is a Ukrainian professional footballer who plays as a midfielder for Oleksandriya in the Ukrainian Premier League.

== Club career ==
Born in Artemivsk, Donetsk Oblast, but grew up in Boryspil, Kyiv Oblast, Vashchenko began his career in the Piddubny Olympic College in Kyiv, then he continued in the Oleksandriya, joining it in August 2022, where he played in the Ukrainian Premier League Reserves.

He made his debut as a second half-time a substitute for Oleksandriya in the Ukrainian Premier League in a home match against Shakhtar Donetsk on 7 May 2023, and become the youngest player of this club to play in the Ukrainian top professional football league.

== International career ==
In March 2024, Vashchenko was called up by manager Dmytro Mykhaylenko to the final squad of the Ukraine national under-19 football team to play in the 2024 UEFA European Under-19 Championship elit round matches.
