= Danil Skorko =

Ukrainian footballer

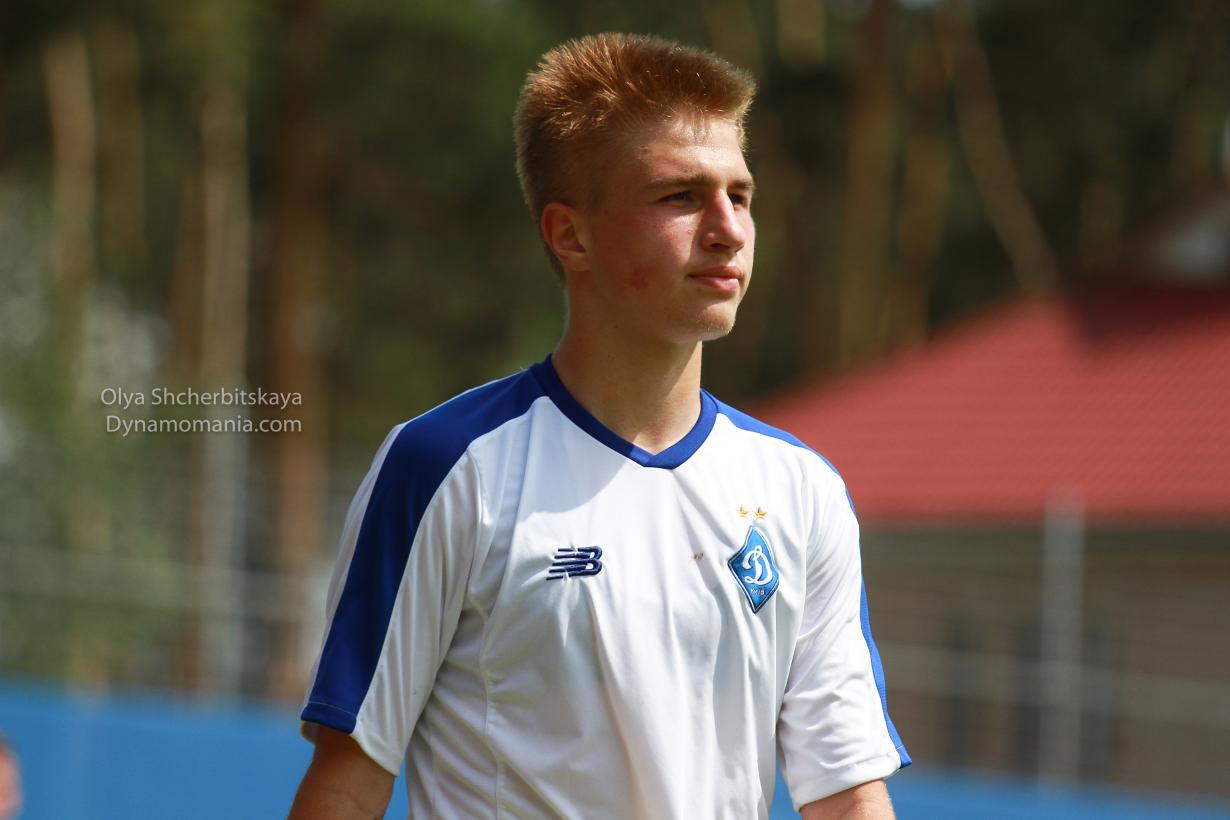

Personal information
- Full name: Danil Pavlovych Skorko
- Date of birth: 6 April 2002 (age 24)
- Place of birth: Chernihiv, Ukraine
- Height: 1.80 m (5 ft 11 in)
- Position: Defender

Team information
- Current team: Oleksandriya
- Number: 22

Youth career
- 2011–2016: Yunist Chernihiv
- 2016–2021: Dynamo Kyiv

Senior career*
Years	Team	Apps	(Gls)
2021–2022	Dynamo Kyiv	0	(0)
2021	→ Chornomorets Odesa (loan)	10	(0)
2022	Zorya Luhansk	0	(0)
2022–	Oleksandriya	67	(4)
2024	→ Oleksandriya-2	4	(0)

International career^{‡}
2017	Ukraine U15	2	(0)
2017–2018	Ukraine U16	7	(0)
2018–2019	Ukraine U17	7	(1)
2020–2023	Ukraine U21	3	(0)
- * Club domestic league appearances and goals as of 22 November 2026 ‡ National team caps and goals as of 19 June 2025

Danil Pavlovych Skorko (Ukrainian: Даніл Павлович Скорко; born 6 April 2002) is a Ukrainian professional footballer who plays as a defender for Oleksandriya.

== Club career ==
=== Early years ===
Danyo Skorko started his career at Yunist Chernihiv until 2016.

=== Dynamo Kyiv ===
At age 14 he moved to Kyiv and started playing for the under-19 squad of Dynamo Kyiv. He made his debut on 2 September 2018 in the match against Mairupol, coming on as a substitute in the 82nd minute replacing Maksym Duhan.

=== Chornomorets Odesa ===
In July 2021 he moved on loan to Chornomorets Odesa. On 25 July he made his league debut against Desna Chernihiv at the Stadion Yuri Gagarin in Chernihiv.

=== Zorya Luhansk ===
On 13 January 2022, he moved to Zorya Luhansk in Ukrainian Premier League, signing a 3-year contract with the club until 2025.

=== Oleksandriya ===
On 15 August 2022 he signed for Oleksandriya in the Ukrainian Premier League.

== International career ==
On 13 October 2018 he scored his first goal for the Ukraine under-17 side against Gibraltar. On 13 October 2021, he played also for the Ukraine under-21 against Northern Ireland at the Ballymena Showgrounds in Ballymena.

In June 2024, he took part in the Maurice Revello Tournament in France with Ukraine. He wins the competition by beating Ivory Coast in final.

== Career statistics ==
=== Club ===
As of 22 November 2026

Appearances and goals by club, season and competition
Club	Season	League			Cup		Continental		Other		Total	
Club	Season	Division	Apps	Goals	Apps	Goals	Apps	Goals	Apps	Goals	Apps	Goals
Dynamo Kyiv	2021–22	Ukrainian Premier League	0	0	0	0	—		—		0	0
Chornomorets Odesa (loan)	2021–22	Ukrainian Premier League	10	0	2	0	—		—		12	0
Zorya Luhansk	2021–22	Ukrainian Premier League	0	0	0	0	0	0	0	0	0	0
Oleksandriya	2022–23	Ukrainian Premier League	11	0	0	0	0	0	0	0	11	0
Oleksandriya	2023–24	Ukrainian Premier League	21	4	2	0	0	0	0	0	23	4
Oleksandriya	2024–25	Ukrainian Premier League	12	0	1	1	0	0	0	0	13	1
Oleksandriya	2025–26	Ukrainian Premier League	18	0	1	0	2 (Note: two appearances in 2025–26 UEFA Europa Conference League Second qualifying round)	0	0	0	21	0
Oleksandriya	2026–27	Ukrainian First League	6	0	2	0	0	0	0	0	8	0
Oleksandriya-2	2024–25	Ukrainian Second League	4	0	0	0	0	0	0	0	4	0
Career total			82	4	8	1	2	0	0	0	92	5

== Honours ==
=== Club ===
FC Dynamo Kyiv U-19

- Ukrainian Premier League Reserves: (2) 2018-19, 2019-20

=== Ukraine U23 ===
- Maurice Revello Tournament: 2024
