= Ante Aralica =

Croatian footballer

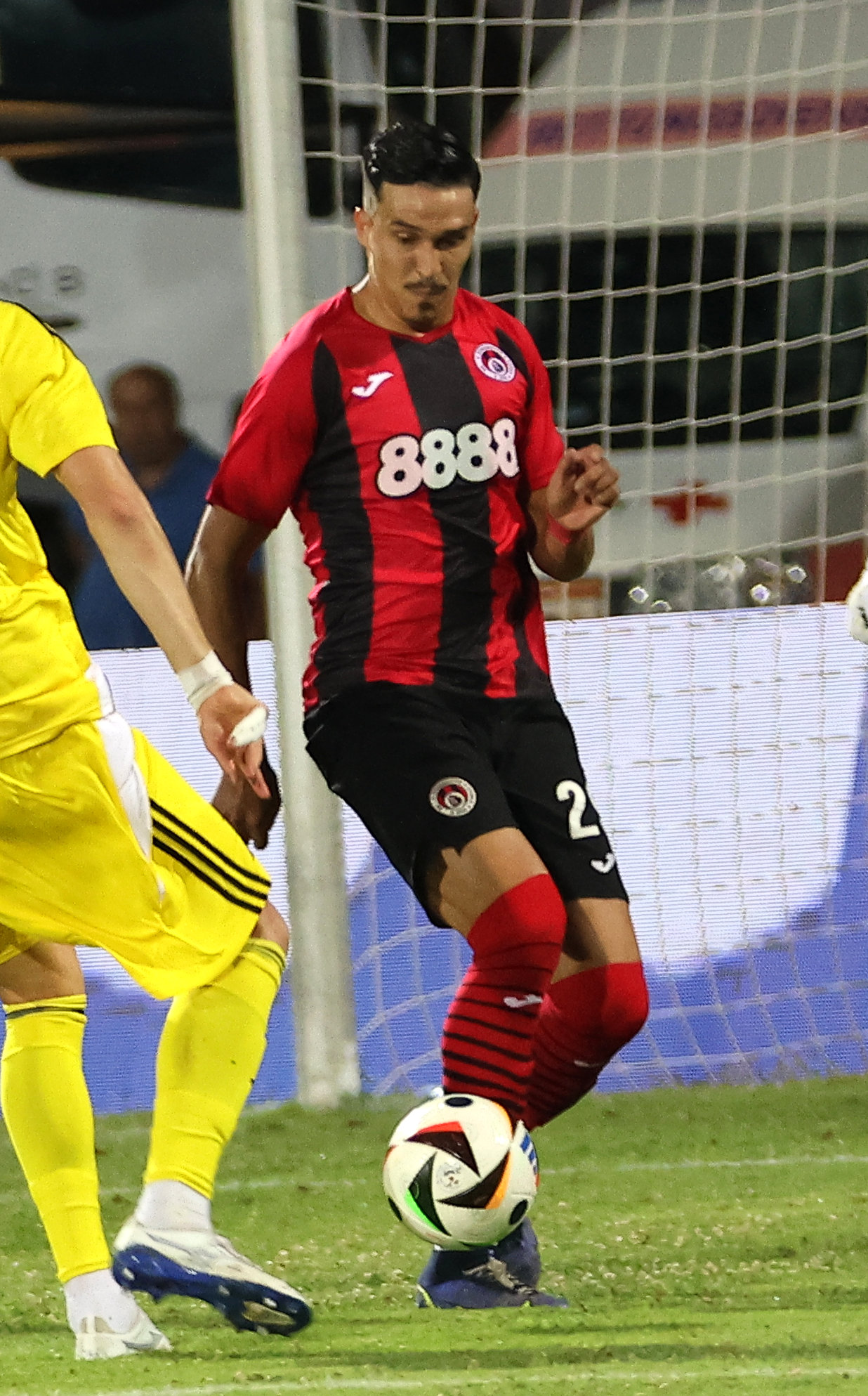

Personal information
- Date of birth: 23 July 1996 (age 30)
- Place of birth: Zagreb, Croatia
- Height: 1.90 m (6 ft 3 in)
- Position: Forward

Team information
- Current team: Lokomotiv Sofia
- Number: 29

Youth career
- 2004–2008: Špansko
- 2008–2014: NK Zagreb

Senior career*
| Years | Team | Apps | (Gls) |
| 2014 | Špansko | 10 | (1) |
| 2014–2015 | Lučko | 24 | (6) |
| 2015–2017 | Lokomotiva | 6 | (1) |
| 2015 | → Lučko (loan) | 17 | (2) |
| 2016 | → Sesvete (loan) | 15 | (4) |
| 2017 | → Rudeš (loan) | 18 | (1) |
| 2018–2020 | Lokomotiv Plovdiv | 71 | (13) |
| 2021 | Hermannstadt | 15 | (0) |
| 2021–2023 | Vllaznia Shkodër | 43 | (11) |
| 2023–2024 | Wieczysta Kraków | 4 | (0) |
| 2024– | Lokomotiv Sofia | 41 | (22) |
- * Club domestic league appearances and goals as of 10:41, 5 May 2026 (UTC)

Ante Aralica (born 23 July 1996) is a Croatian professional footballer who plays as a forward for Bulgarian First League club Lokomotiv Sofia.

== Club career ==
Aralica started his career at NK Lučko and made his senior debut in August 2014, at the age of 18. In his first season he scored six times in 24 league appearances in the Croatian Second Football League.

In June 2015, Aralica joined Croatian First Football League side NK Lokomotiva, and had loan spells at NK Lučko, NK Sesvete and NK Rudeš before moving permanently to Bulgarian club Lokomotiv Plovdiv in January 2018.

== Honours ==
Rudeš

- Second Football League: 2016–17

Lokomotiv Plovdiv

- Bulgarian Cup: 2018–19, 2019–20
- Bulgarian Supercup: 2020

Vllaznia Shkodër

- Albanian Cup: 2021–22

Wieczysta Kraków

- III liga, group IV: 2023–24
