= Agim Dajçi =

Albanian footballer

Personal information
- Date of birth: 27 July 2000 (age 26)
- Place of birth: Tirana, Albania
- Position: Full-back

Youth career
- Shkëndija Tiranë
- 2019: Partizani Tirana

Senior career*
Years	Team	Apps	(Gls)
2019–2022	Partizani Tirana	10	(0)
2021	→ Bylis (loan)	0	(0)
2021–2022	→ Besa Kavajë (loan)	17	(0)
- * Club domestic league appearances and goals as of 19 May 2023

Agim Dajçi (born 27 July 2000) is an Albanian footballer who played as a defender.

== Career ==
A graduate of the club's youth academy, Dajçi made his competitive debut for the club on 18 September 2019, playing the entirety of a 3-0 Cup victory over Vora. He made his first appearance in the Albanian Superliga later that season, starting in a 3–0 home victory over Vllaznia on July 24.

In 2021 he went on loan to Besa Kavajë.
