= Bismark Ngissah =

Ghanaian footballer

Personal information
- Date of birth: 9 January 1998 (age 28)
- Place of birth: Accra, Ghana
- Height: 1.87 m (6 ft 2 in)
- Position: Forward

Team information
- Current team: ASD Calcio Mozzecane

Youth career
- Chievo

Senior career*
Years	Team	Apps	(Gls)
2016–2020	Chievo	0	(0)
2016	→ Arezzo (loan)	1	(0)
2017–2019	→ Viterbese (loan)	66	(7)
2019–2020	→ Imolese (loan)	16	(1)
2020	→ Vis Pesaro (loan)	4	(0)
2020–2021	Vis Pesaro	14	(0)
2021	Pro Sesto	10	(1)
2021	Skënderbeu Korçë	8	(0)
2022	Birkirkara	9	(0)
2022	Montecchio Maggiore	9	(0)
2024–	ASD Calcio Mozzecane		
- * Club domestic league appearances and goals as of 26 September 2026

Bismark Ngissah (born 9 January 1998) is a Ghanaian professional footballer who plays as a forward for ASD Calcio Mozzecane.

== Club career ==
He made his professional debut in the Lega Pro for Arezzo on 13 March 2016 in a game against Ancona.

On 2 September 2019, he joined Imolese on a season-long loan. On 31 January 2020, he moved on a new loan to Vis Pesaro.

On 2 October 2020 he returned to Vis Pesaro on a one-year contract.

On 15 January 2021, he moved to Pro Sesto.

On 23 July 2021, he moved to Skënderbeu Korçë in the Albanian SuperLiga (Superleague).
