= Gresild Lika =

Albanian footballer

Personal information
- Date of birth: 2 November 1997 (age 29)
- Place of birth: Tirana, Albania
- Height: 1.77 m (5 ft 10 in)
- Position: Midfielder

Team information
- Current team: Vora
- Number: 7

Youth career
- 2005–2012: Dinamo Tirana
- 2012–2015: Partizani Tirana

Senior career*
Years	Team	Apps	(Gls)
2015–2018	Partizani Tirana	0	(0)
2017–2018	→ Dinamo Tirana (loan)	26	(2)
2018–2019	Korabi Peshkopi	22	(1)
2019–2020	Luftëtari	30	(6)
2020–2021	Bylis	5	(1)
2021	→ Arbëria (loan)	14	(0)
2021–2022	Partizani Tirana	5	(1)
2022–2024	Skënderbeu	49	(2)
2024–	Vora	11	(0)
- * Club domestic league appearances and goals as of 12 September 2024

Gresild Lika (born 2 November 1997) is an Albanian footballer who plays as a midfielder for Vora in the Kategoria e Parë.

== Career ==
=== Luftëtari ===
In the summer of 2019, Lika signed for Albanian Superliga club Luftëtari. He made his league debut for the club on 24 August 2019, playing the entirety of a 3–0 away defeat to KF Tirana.

=== Partizani ===
In the summer of 2021, Lika signed for the Albanian Superliga club FK Partizani.
