= Yuriy Kopyna =

Ukrainian footballer

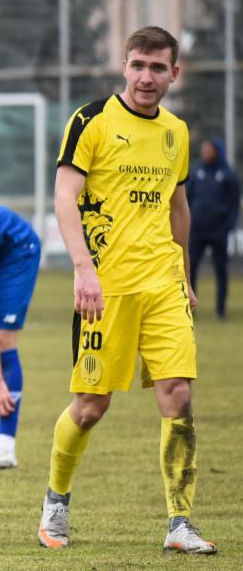
- Yuriy Kopyna playing for Rukh Lviv U-21 in 2021

Personal information
- Full name: Yuriy Yaroslavovych Kopyna
- Date of birth: 4 July 1996 (age 30)
- Place of birth: Malechkovychi, Lviv Oblast, Ukraine
- Height: 1.81 m (5 ft 11 in)
- Position: Midfielder

Team information
- Current team: Rukh Lviv
- Number: 23

Youth career
- 2009–2010: Karpaty Lviv
- 2010–2011: Lviv
- 2011–2012: Metalist Kharkiv

Senior career*
Years	Team	Apps	(Gls)
2012–2016	Metalist Kharkiv	1	(0)
2016	Lviv	10	(1)
2017–2021	Rukh Lviv	104	(11)
2021–2025	Oleksandriya	63	(1)
2025–26	Rukh Lviv	21	(1)
2026 -	Oleksandriya	6	(0)
- * Club domestic league appearances and goals as of 27/10/26 @ 14:14(AEST)

Yuriy Kopyna (Ukrainian: Юрій Ярославович Копина; born 4 July 1996) is a Ukrainian professional footballer who plays as a midfielder for Rukh Lviv.

== Career ==
Born in Pustomyty Raion, Kopyna is a product of the different youth sportive schools. His first trainer was Roman Marych.

He spent his career in the Ukrainian Premier League Reserves club FC Metalist. And in spring 2016 Kopyna was promoted to the Ukrainian Premier League's squad. He made his debut for Metalist Kharkiv in the Ukrainian Premier League in a match against FC Stal Dniprodzerzhynsk on 23 April 2016.
