= Mikel Brahilika =

Albanian footballer

Personal information
- Date of birth: 5 August 1999 (age 27)
- Place of birth: Tirana, Albania
- Position: Centre back

Team information
- Current team: Bylis Ballsh
- Number: 28

Senior career*
Years	Team	Apps	(Gls)
2018–2019	Kamza	1	(0)
2019–2020	Iliria	5	(0)
2020	Luftëtari	10	(0)
2020–2022	Turbina Cërrik	40	(2)
2022–	Bylis Ballsh	0	(0)
- * Club domestic league appearances and goals as of 28 April 2023

Mikel Brahilika (born 5 August 1999) is an Albanian footballer who plays as a defender for Bylis Ballsh in the Kategoria Superiore.

== Career ==
=== Luftëtari ===
In January 2020, Brahilika left Iliria, joining Albanian Superliga club Luftëtari. He made his league debut for the club on 8 March 2020, coming on as a 53rd-minute substitute for Amer Duka in a 1–1 draw with Bylis.
