= Dmytro Chernysh (footballer, born 2004) =

Ukrainian footballer

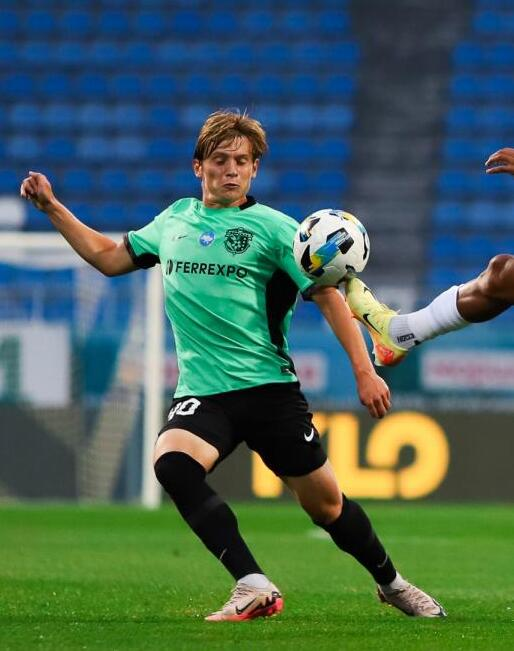

Personal information
- Full name: Dmytro Yehorovych Chernysh
- Date of birth: 10 August 2004 (age 22)
- Place of birth: Nikopol, Ukraine
- Height: 1.73 m (5 ft 8 in)
- Position: Central midfielder

Team information
- Current team: Oleksandriya
- Number: 40

Youth career
- 2018–2019: DVUFK Dnipro
- 2019–2021: Metalurh Zaporizhzhia

Senior career*
Years	Team	Apps	(Gls)
2021–2025	Vorskla Poltava	12	(0)
2025–	Oleksandriya	5	(0)

International career^{‡}
2023	Ukraine U19	3	(0)
- * Club domestic league appearances and goals as of 3 June 2026 ‡ National team caps and goals as of 7 October 2023

Dmytro Yehorovych Chernysh (Ukrainian: Дмитро Єгорович Черниш; born 10 August 2004) is a Ukrainian professional footballer who plays as a central midfielder for Oleksandriya in the Ukrainian Premier League.

== Career ==
=== Early years ===
Chernysh is a product of DVUFK Dnipro and Metalurh Zaporizhzhia academies.

=== Vorskla Poltava ===
In July 2021, Vorskla Poltava signed him. He made his debut as a second half-taim substituted player for Vorskla Poltava in the Ukrainian Premier League in an away rowing match against Veres Rivne on 12 March 2023.

== International career ==
In March 2023, Chernysh was called up to the final squad of the Ukraine national under-19 football team to play in the 2023 UEFA European Under-19 Championship elit round qualification matches.
