= Ali Samake =

Malian footballer

Personal information
- Full name: Badra Ali Samake
- Date of birth: 30 January 2000 (age 26)
- Place of birth: Mali
- Height: 1.75 m (5 ft 9 in)
- Position: Defender

Team information
- Current team: Zimbru Chișinău
- Number: 16

Youth career
- 2017–2019: Torino

Senior career*
Years	Team	Apps	(Gls)
2019–2020	Torino	0	(0)
2019–2020	→ Lecco (loan)	18	(0)
2020	→ Chieri (loan)	8	(1)
2020–2021	Ayia Napa	21	(1)
2021–2023	Dinamo City	36	(2)
2023	→ Lushnja (loan)	12	(1)
2024	Sancataldese Calcio	10	(0)
2024–	Zimbru Chișinău	12	(0)
- * Club domestic league appearances and goals as of 5 January 2025

Badra Ali Samake (born 30 January 2000), known as Ali Samake, is a Malian football player who plays for Moldovan Liga club Zimbru Chișinău.

== Club career ==
=== Torino ===
He started playing for Torino's Under-19 squad in the 2017–18 season. He has not received any call-ups to the senior squad.

==== Loan to Lecco ====
He originally joined Lecco on loan in Serie D in January 2019. At the end of the 2018–19 season, Lecco was promoted to Serie C and the loan was renewed on 25 July 2019.

He made his professional Serie C debut for Lecco on 22 September 2019 in a game against Monza. He substituted Lorenzo Vignati in the 90th minute.

==== Loan to Chieri ====
On 4 January 2020, Torino terminated the loan to Lecco (where he only appeared in 2 league games since promotion to Serie C) and loaned him to Serie D club Chieri.
