= Emiljano Musta =

Albanian footballer

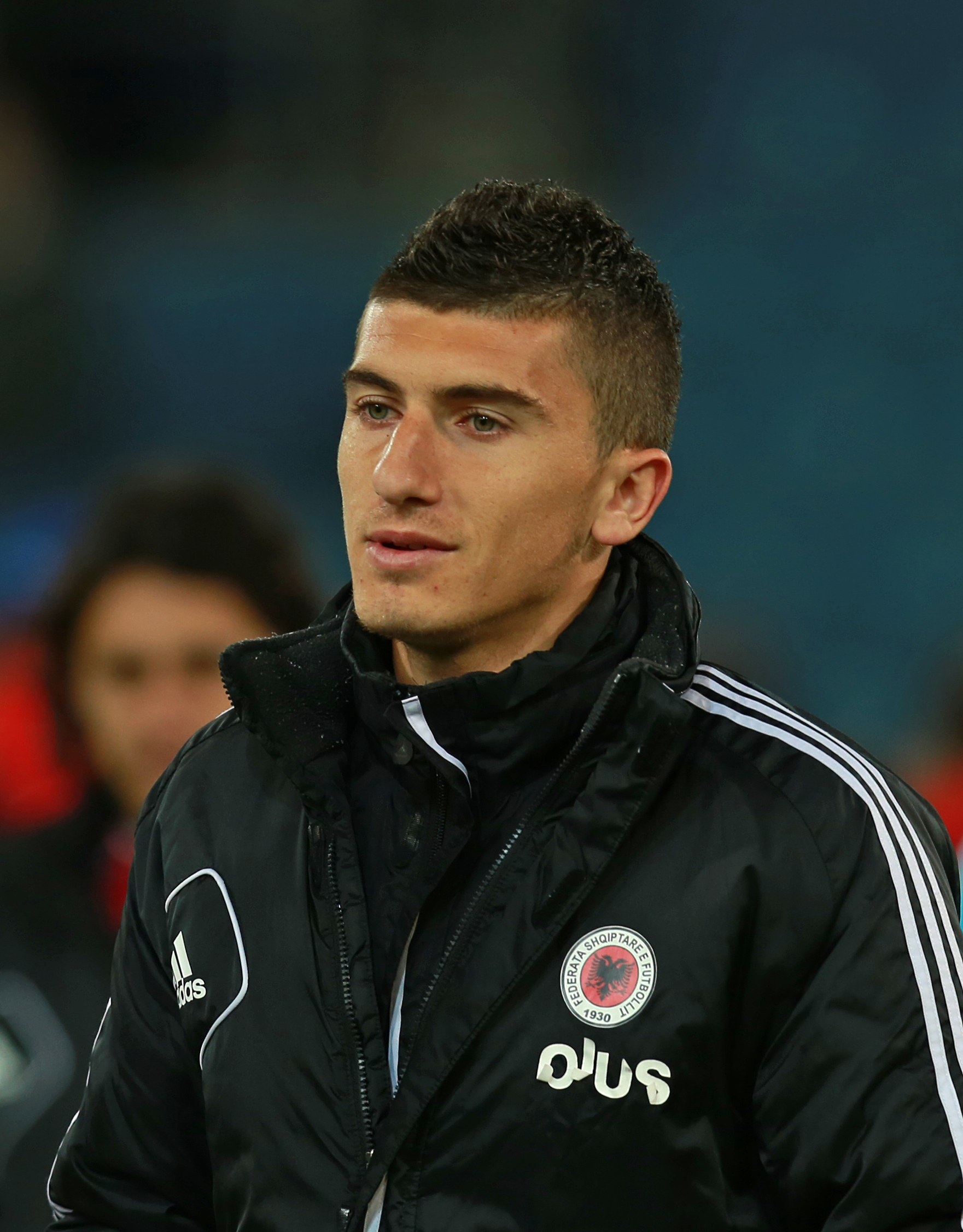

Personal information
- Full name: Emiljano Musta
- Date of birth: 31 January 1992 (age 34)
- Place of birth: Elbasan, Albania
- Height: 1.80 m (5 ft 11 in)
- Positions: Left-back; left midfielder

Team information
- Current team: Vllaznia Shkodër
- Number: 29

Youth career
- 2006–2010: Elbasani

Senior career*
Years	Team	Apps	(Gls)
2010–2013	Elbasani	40	(2)
2012–2013	Shkumbini Peqin	13	(0)
2013–2014	Partizani Tirana	12	(0)
2014–2015	Elbasani	26	(1)
2015–2017	Teuta Durrës	60	(8)
2017–2019	Flamurtari	66	(7)
2019–2020	Kukësi	27	(2)
2020–2021	Laçi	32	(5)
2021–2022	Partizani Tirana	15	(2)
2022	Kukësi	14	(1)
2022–2024	Egnatia	45	(3)
2024–2026	Elbasani	60	(7)
2026–	Vllaznia Shkodër	0	(0)

International career
2010–2011	Albania U19	3	(0)
2012–2013	Albania U21	1	(0)
- * Club domestic league appearances and goals as of 24 June 2026

Emiljano Musta (born 31 January 1992 in Elbasan) is an Albanian professional footballer who plays as a left-back or left midfielder for Vllaznia Shkodër in the Albanian Superliga.

== Club career ==
=== Teuta Durrës ===
Following Elbasani's relegation from the Albanian Superliga, Musta signed a two-year contract with an option of a further one with Teuta Durrës along with his teammate Ardit Hila. On 16 October, he scored his second goal of the season during the 2–2 away draw against Skënderbeu Korçë, causing them the first draw of the season after six consecutive victorys. On 18 June 2017, following the end of his regular contract, Musta decided not to active his one-year renewal, leaving the club and becoming a free agent in the process.

=== Flamurtari Vlorë ===
On 19 June 2017, Musta completed a transfer to fellow Albanian Superliga side Flamurtari Vlorë.

=== Kükesi ===
Ahead of the 2019/20 season, Musta joined FK Kukësi on a one-year contract.

== International career ==
Musta has represented Albania at under-19 and -21 level. He was part of under-21 team in their unsuccessful 2015 UEFA European Under-21 Championship qualifying campaign, where he was an unused substitute in team's last match against Austria.

== Career statistics ==
As of 19 June 2017

Appearances and goals by club, season and competition
Club	Season	League			Cup		Continental		Total	
Club	Season	Division	Apps	Goals	Apps	Goals	Apps	Goals	Apps	Goals
Elbasani	2010–11	Albanian Superliga	5	0	0	0	—		5	0
Elbasani	2011–12	Albanian First Division	21	2	4	0	—		25	2
Elbasani	2012–13	Albanian First Division	14	0	2	0	—		16	0
Elbasani	Total		40	2	6	0	—		46	2
Shkumbini Peqin	2012–13	Albanian Superliga	13	0	2	0	—		15	0
Shkumbini Peqin	Total		13	0	2	0	—		15	0
Partizani Tirana	2013–14	Albanian Superliga	12	0	2	0	—		14	0
Partizani Tirana	Total		12	0	2	0	—		14	0
Elbasani	2014–15	Albanian Superliga	26	1	3	0	—		29	1
Elbasani	Total		26	1	3	0	—		29	1
Teuta Durrës	2015–16	Albanian Superliga	31	7	4	0	—		35	7
Teuta Durrës	2016–17	Albanian Superliga	31	1	6	0	2 (Note: All appearance(s) in UEFA Europa League)	0	37	1
Teuta Durrës	Total		62	8	10	2	2	0	74	8
Flamurtari Vlorë	2017–18	Albanian Superliga	0	0	0	0	—		0	0
Flamurtari Vlorë	Total		0	0	0	0	—		0	0
Career total			153	11	23	0	2	0	178	11
