= Valentino Murataj =

Albanian footballer

Personal information
- Date of birth: 15 August 1996 (age 30)
- Place of birth: Fier, Albania
- Position: Central midfielder

Team information
- Current team: Partizani Tiranë
- Number: 21

Youth career
- 2010–2012: Albpetrol Patos
- 2013–2014: Bylis Ballsh
- 2015: Partizani Tiranë

Senior career*
Years	Team	Apps	(Gls)
2012–2013	Albpetrol Patos	?	(?)
2013–2014	Bylis Ballsh	0	(0)
2014	Olimpic Tiranë	?	(?)
2015–2017	Dinamo Tiranë	41	(2)
2017–2021	Bylis Ballsh	89	(13)
2021–2024	Partizani Tiranë	115	(3)
2024–2026	Flamurtari Vlorë	26	(1)
2026–	Partizani Tiranë	14	(1)
- * Club domestic league appearances and goals as of 13 May 2026

Valentino Murataj (born 15 August 1996) is an Albanian professional footballer who plays as a midfielder for Albanian club Partizani Tiranë.

== Career statistics ==
=== Clubs ===
As of 24 March 2020

Club	Season	Division	League		Cup		Europe (Note: Including European competitions, such as UEFA Champions League and UEFA Europa League)		Other (Note: Including other competitions, such as Albanian Supercup)		Total	
Club	Season	Division	Apps	Goals	Apps	Goals	Apps	Goals	Apps	Goals	Apps	Goals
Bylis	2013–14	Kategoria Superiore	0	0	2	0	—		—		2	0
Bylis	Total		0	0	2	0	—		—		2	0
Dinamo Tirana	2015–16	Kategoria e Parë	20	2	2	0	—		—		22	2
Dinamo Tirana	2016–17	Kategoria e Parë	21	0	4	0	—		—		25	0
Dinamo Tirana	Total		41	2	6	0	—		—		47	2
Bylis	2017–18	Kategoria e Parë	23	7	3	0	—		—		26	7
Bylis	2018–19	Kategoria e Parë	21	2	4	0	—		—		25	2
Bylis	2019–20	Kategoria Superiore	24	3	4	0	—		—		28	3
Bylis	Total		68	12	11	0	—		—		79	12
Partizani	2020–21	Kategoria Superiore	20	1	1	0	—		—		21	1
Partizani	2021–22	Kategoria Superiore	26	1	6	1	4	0	—		36	1
Partizani	2022–23	Kategoria Superiore	34	1	3	1	3	0	—		40	2
Partizani	2023–24	Kategoria Superiore	15	0	0	0	8	0	1	0	24	0
Total			95	3	10	2	15	0	1	0	121	5
Career total			204	17	29	2	15	0	1	0	249	19
