= Stênio Júnior =

Brazilian footballer

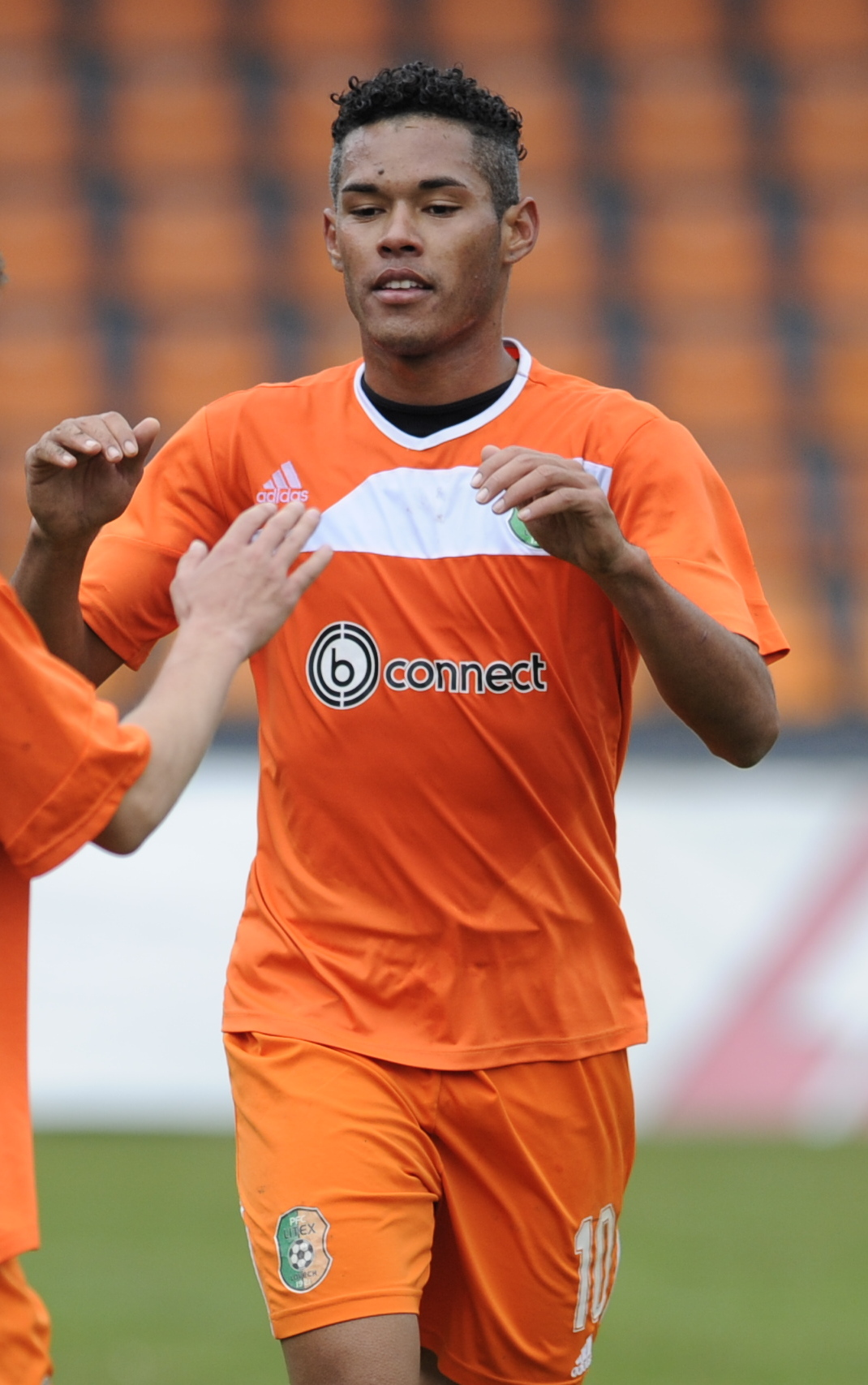

Personal information
- Full name: Stênio Marcos da Fonseca Salazar Júnior
- Date of birth: 10 June 1991 (age 35)
- Place of birth: Fortaleza, Brazil
- Height: 1.84 m (6 ft 0 in)
- Position: Forward

Team information
- Current team: Rayong
- Number: 18

Youth career
- Horizonte

Senior career*
Years	Team	Apps	(Gls)
2012–2013	Horizonte	5	(1)
2013–2014	Litex Lovech	15	(1)
2013	→ Pelister (loan)	16	(7)
2014–2019	Shkëndija	170	(40)
2020	Riga	11	(2)
2021–2022	Partizani Tirana	49	(18)
2022	Chiangmai	7	(6)
2023	BG Pathum United	11	(3)
2023–2024	Chiangmai	25	(10)
2024–	Rayong	50	(22)
- * Club domestic league appearances and goals as of 7 March 2026

Stênio Marcos da Fonseca Salazar Júnior (born 10 June 1991), or simply Stênio Júnior, is a Brazilian professional footballer who plays as a forward for Rayong in the Thai League 1.

== Career ==
Stênio Júnior, started his professional career in Brazilian club Horizonte FC when he was 20 years old. He played for Horizonte in 2012 and then for a short period in 2013. While playing for Horizonte FC, Junior was spotted by Bulgarian club Litex Lovech (coached by Hristo Stoichkov), which soon bought him. The transfer was finalized on 20 January 2013. Later that year, on 1 July 2013, Junior was loaned to Macedonian club FK Pelister. In 2013–14 season, Junior scored 7 goals for FK Pelister (4 of them in one match).

Stênio Júnior's talent was spotted by scouts of KF Shkëndija. At first the negotiations didn't go very well, and when it was thought the negotiations were over, FK Pelister and Litex Lovech agreed on a deal. KF Shkëndija paid 50 000 euro to acquire the Brazilian talent.

He made his league debut for KF Shkëndija on 2 March 2014, when Shkëndija played against Makedonija GP. Junior played in the second half of the game and with accurate passing helped KF Shkëndija score 2 more goals winning the match 3-0. He made a shot which was saved by Makedonija GP's goalkeeper. After the match, the manager, Shpëtim Duro stated that Junior played a great game in his debut and that he has a bright future in KF Shkëndija.

On 23 March 2014, Stenio scored his first goal for Shkendija in an away match against Vardar. His goal proved decisive for Shkendija as the match ended 2-1 in favor of Shkendija. His 2nd goal for Shkendija came in the next match in which KF Shkendija played FK Rabotnicki at home. He scored the first goal of the match which was followed by two other goals for Shkendija and one for Rabotnicki with a final result 3-1.

In January 2020, Stênio Júnior joined Latvian club Riga. He remained with the team until September 2020.

== Career statistics ==
(Correct as of 21 May 2023)

Club	Season	League			Cup		State League		Continental		Total	
Club	Season	Division	Apps	Goals	Apps	Goals	Apps	Goals	Apps	Goals	Apps	Goals
Horizonte FC	2012	Série D	5	1	1	0	21	6	—		27	7
Horizonte FC	2013	Campeonato Cearense	0	0	0	0	3	0	—		3	0
Horizonte FC	Total		5	1	1	0	24	6	—		30	7
Litex Lovech	2012–13	Bulgarian First League	15	1	1	0	—		—		16	1
Litex Lovech	Total		15	1	1	0	—		—		16	1
FK Pelister	2013–14	Macedonian First League	16	7	1	0	—		—		17	7
FK Pelister	Total		16	7	1	0	—		—		17	7
KF Shkëndija	2013–14	Macedonian First League	11	6	0	0	—		—		11	6
KF Shkëndija	2014–15	Macedonian First League	27	4	0	0	—		2	0	29	4
KF Shkëndija	2015–16	Macedonian First League	30	5	4	3	—		2	0	36	8
KF Shkëndija	2016–17	Macedonian First League	30	6	5	1	—		8	2	43	9
KF Shkëndija	2017–18	Macedonian First League	32	11	5	0	—		4	2	41	13
KF Shkëndija	2018–19	Macedonian First League	23	4	0	0	—		8	1	31	5
KF Shkëndija	2019–20	Macedonian First League	17	4	1	1	—		2	0	20	5
KF Shkëndija	Total		170	40	15	5	—		26	5	211	50
Riga FC	2020	Virsliga	11	2	0	0	—		1	0	12	2
Riga FC	Total		11	2	0	0	—		1	0	12	2
Career total			217	51	18	5	24	6	27	5	288	67

== Honours ==
BG Pathum United

- Thai League Cup runners-up: 2022–23
