= Kosta Vangjeli =

Albanian footballer

Personal information
- Full name: Kosta Vangjeli
- Date of birth: 21 July 2000 (age 26)
- Place of birth: Thessaloniki, Greece
- Position: Right-back

Team information
- Current team: Skënderbeu
- Number: 21

Youth career
- 2013–2015: KF Korça
- 2016–2019: Skënderbeu

Senior career*
Years	Team	Apps	(Gls)
2019–2022	Skënderbeu	61	(3)
2023–	Skënderbeu	75	(2)

International career
2021	Albania U21	5	(0)
- * Club domestic league appearances and goals as of 1 June 2024

Kosta Vangjeli (born 21 July 2000) is a professional footballer who plays as a right-back for Albanian club Skënderbeu.

== Personal life ==
Vangjeli was born in Thessaloniki but grew up in his hometown Korçë.
