= Fahrudin Gjurgjevikj =

Macedonian footballer

Personal information
- Full name: Fahrudin Gjurgjevikj
- Date of birth: 17 February 1992 (age 34)
- Place of birth: Skopje, Macedonia
- Height: 1.78 m (5 ft 10 in)
- Position: Forward

Team information
- Current team: Gostivari
- Number: 29

Youth career
- –2009: Makedonija GP

Senior career*
Years	Team	Apps	(Gls)
2009	Makedonija GP	7	(1)
2010–2011	Vardar	32	(7)
2011–2012	Spartak Subotica	23	(0)
2013	Zvijezda Gradačac	9	(0)
2013–2014	Makedonija GP	29	(7)
2014–2018	Varnsdorf	106	(24)
2018–2020	Hradec Králové	43	(8)
2020–2021	Rabotnichki	26	(12)
2021–2022	Vllaznia Shkodër	25	(1)
2022	Makedonija G.P.	11	(1)
2023–	Gostivari	11	(0)

International career
	Macedonia U-19	7	(1)
2012–2014	Macedonia U-21	8	(0)
- * Club domestic league appearances and goals as of 1 June 2024

Fahrudin Gjurgjevikj (Macedonian: Фахрудин Ѓурѓевиќ, born 17 February 1992) is a Macedonian footballer who plays for Gostivari. His surname can also be transliterated in Serbian Cyrillic as Ђурђевић, or as Đurđević/Djurdjević in Latin script.

== Club career ==
Born in Skopje, he had previously played in the Makedonija GP and Vardar. He moved to Serbia in the summer 2011 to sign with SuperLiga club FK Spartak Zlatibor Voda. He can play either as forward or any side winger. During the winter break of the 2012–13 season he moved to Bosnian side NK Zvijezda Gradačac. In the summer 2013 he returned to Macedonia and signed with his former club FK Makedonija Gjorče Petrov.

== International career ==
He has been a regular member of the Macedonian U-19 national team. In August 2011 he has been called for the Macedonian U-19 national team to play a friendly match against Cyprus U21 on 6 September. Since 2012 he has also been a member of the Macedonian U-21 team.
