= Tedi Cara =

Albanian footballer

Personal information
- Date of birth: 15 April 2000 (age 26)
- Place of birth: Kavajë, Albania
- Height: 1.75 m (5 ft 9 in)
- Position: Forward

Team information
- Current team: LNZ Cherkasy
- Number: 77

Youth career
- 2011–2018: Besa Kavajë

Senior career*
Years	Team	Apps	(Gls)
2016–2020	Besa Kavajë	53	(12)
2020–2025	Partizani Tirana	161	(32)
2025–2026	Oleksandriya	41	(12)
2026–	LNZ Cherkasy	10	(2)

International career
2018	Albania U19	2	(0)
2019–2021	Albania U21	5	(0)
2022–	Albania	2	(0)
- * Club domestic league appearances and goals as of 3 June 2026

Tedi Cara (born 15 April 2000) is an Albanian footballer who plays as a left winger or forward for LNZ Cherkasy in Ukrainian Premier League . He represents Albania national football team.

== Honours ==
Individual

- SportArena Player of the Round: 2025–26 (Round 5),
- Ukrainian Premier League Player of the Round: 2025–26 (Round 5),
