= FC Oleksandriya =

Oleksandriya
- Full name: Футбольний клуб Олександрія; Football Club Oleksandriya
- Nicknames: Mistiany (The Citizens), Sashka (The Alex)
- Founded: 1990; 36 years ago
- Ground: CSC Nika
- Capacity: 7,000
- Owner(s): Serhiy Kuzmenko (honorary president); UkrAhroKom (98.5%); AhroVista (1.5%)
- General Director: Ivan Kuzmenko
- Manager: Volodymyr Sharan
- League: Ukrainian First League
- 2025–26: Ukrainian Premier League, 15th of 16 (relegated via play-offs)
- Website: fco.com.ua
Home colours	Away colours

Football Club Oleksandriya (Ukrainian: Футбольний клуб Олександрія), commonly known as Oleksandriya, is a Ukrainian professional football club based in the city of Oleksandriya, Kirovohrad Oblast. Founded in 1990, the club plays in the Ukrainian First League in 2026-27 following relegation from the Ukrainian Premier League. The year 1948 on the club's crest appeared after its merger with UkrAhroKom in 2014 and depicts football heritage of the club rather than the club's foundation.

In 2014 the club changed ownership when the original owner Mykola Lavrenko sold it to Serhiy Kuzmenko, the owner of UkrAhroKom.

Debuting in the 2016–17 UEFA Europa League in July 2016, the club became the first one from Kirovohrad Oblast to qualify for the European competitions and second after Kryvbas in Central Ukraine (Right-bank).

== History ==
=== Names ===
- 1990–2003 Polihraftekhnika
- 2004–2014 PFC Oleksandriya
- 2014–present FC Oleksandriya (merger with UkrAhroKom)

=== Pre-existing club (Shakhtar Oleksandriya) ===
FC Shakhtar Oleksandriya was established in 1948 at the production association "Oleksandriyavuhillya". At first the club played at the amateur competitions of the Ukrainian SSR until 1962 when it was accepted to the Class B which was a professional competitions. It played in Class B until the tournament was disbanded in 1971. After that the club returned to the amateurs where it played from 1971 to 1985 and 1988 to 1990. After 1990 season the club folded.

The club played its games at its own Shakhtar Stadium.

=== Polihraftekhnika / PFC Oleksandriya ===
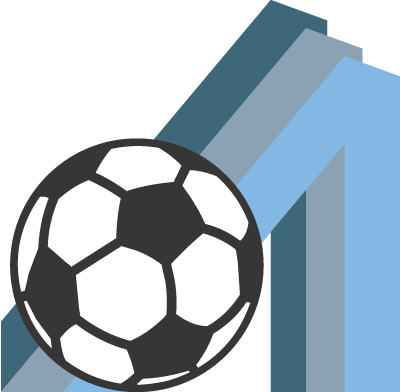
Original emblem of Polihraftekhnika

The club was formed on 6 March 1990 as Polihraftekhnika Oleksandriya (Ukrainian: Поліграфтехніка Олександрія) at the local printing equipment plant. The same year the club won the regional football competitions of the Kirovohrad Oblast. At same time in 1990 another Oleksandriya club Shakhtar represented the Kirovohrad region at the republican amateur level. FC Shakhtar Oleksandriya was a club of the Oleksandriyavuhillya coal mine company. At first Polihraftekhinka was leasing the Shakhtar Stadium, while building its own stadium Olimp.

From 2001 to 2003, PFC Oleksandriya played in the Ukrainian Premier League under the name of Polihraftechnika Oleksandriya, which it had since 1991. After the 2003 season the club's administration citing fiscal problems left the Professional Football League and was idle for one season.

In 2004 the president of Polihraftekhnika reestablished the club as PFC Oleksandriya, rejoined the Professional Football League and entered the Druha Liha. At the same time the Oleksandriya city administration created own football club MFC Oleksandriya which also entered the Druha Liha, however, soon thereafter the city's club withdrew from professional competitions.

Prior to the start of 2014–15 Ukrainian First League season PFC Oleksandriya going through some financial difficulties merged with UkrAhroKom Holovkivka who were also competing in the Ukrainian First League into one club and renaming themselves to FC Oleksandriya. The merger saved the Oleksandriya's club from another bankruptcy. Since the 2014 merger under the new manager Serhiy Kuzmenko (former chairman of FC UkrAhroKom), the club now claims its heritage of the Soviet miner's team of Shakhtar Oleksandriya by adding year of Shakhtar's establishment onto its club shield.

In the 2015–16 Ukrainian Premier League season, FC Oleksandriya finished 6th place, qualifying for the third qualifying round of UEFA Europa League, where they marked their debut in a European competition. Despite losing to HNK Hajduk Split 6 - 1 on aggregate, they followed their performance last season by finishing 5th, qualifying for the third qualifying round of the 2017–18 UEFA Europa League. There they secured their first ever European win, defeating Romanian side FC Astra Giurgiu 1 - 0 on aggregate and progressing to the play-off round, where they finally fell to Belarusian side FC BATE Borisov.

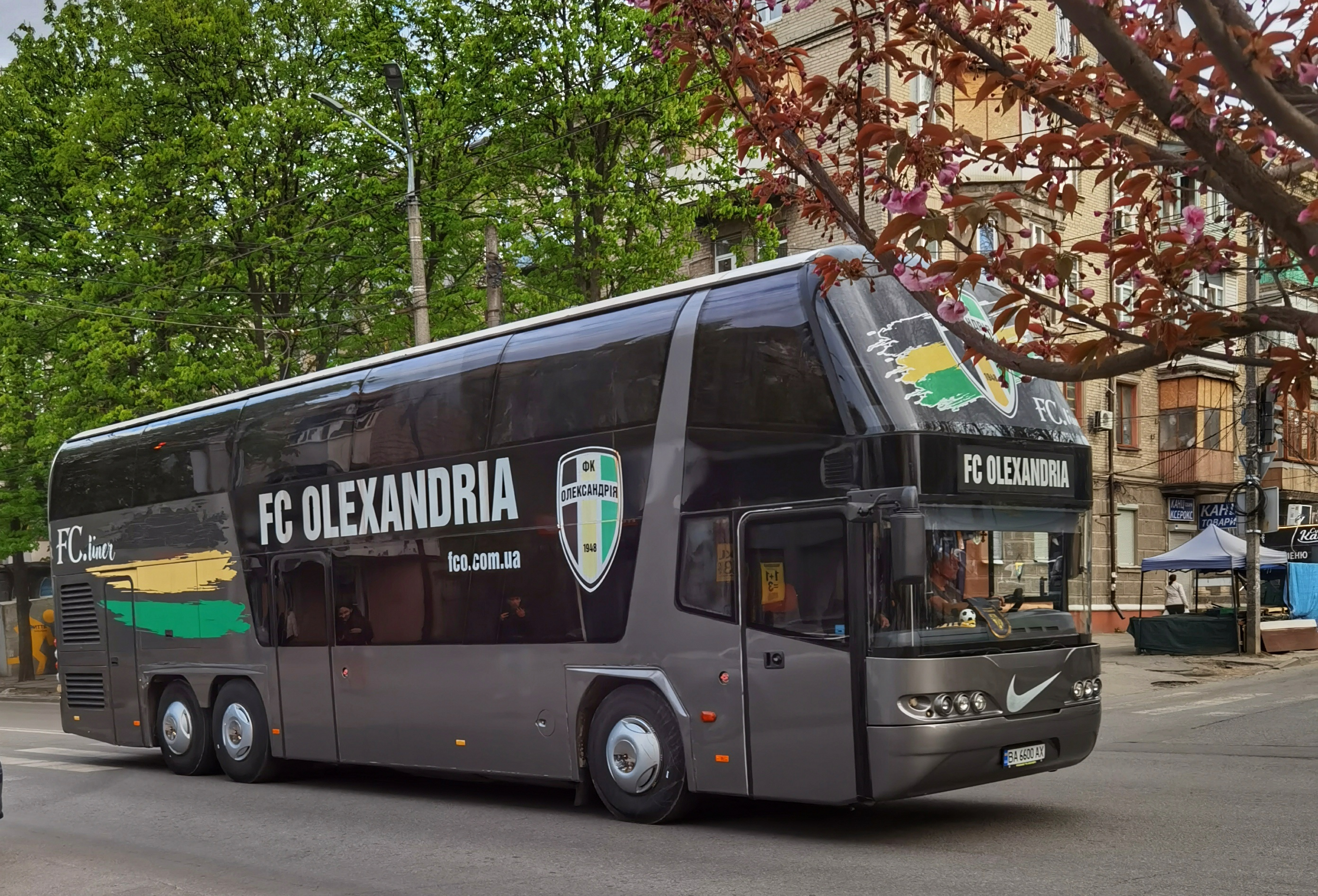
FC Olexandria bus in Dnipro, Ukraine

In the 2018–19 Ukrainian Premier League season, they finished 3rd place, marking their first top 3 finish in the league, just behind heavyweights FC Shakhtar Donetsk and FC Dynamo Kyiv, also securing qualification for the group stage of the 2019–20 UEFA Europa League. However, they were unable to secure a single win, finishing bottom of their group with 3 draws and 3 losses.

The 2024–25 season marked a historic achievement for FC Oleksandriya, as the team secured a triumphant second-place finish in the Ukrainian Premier League for the very first time, positioned behind Dynamo Kyiv but notably ahead of Shakhtar Donetsk. Much of this success is credited to their manager Ruslan Rotan, who managed to become only the second manager for the club to secure 30 league wins, after Volodymyr Sharan's 69 league wins.

With their runner-up finish, they were able to secure a spot in the second qualifying round of the 2025–26 UEFA Conference League, where they lost to FK Partizan 6 - 0 on aggregate. In the same season, Oleksandryia were relegated to the Ukrainian First League for the first time since the 2014-15 season.

== Stadium ==
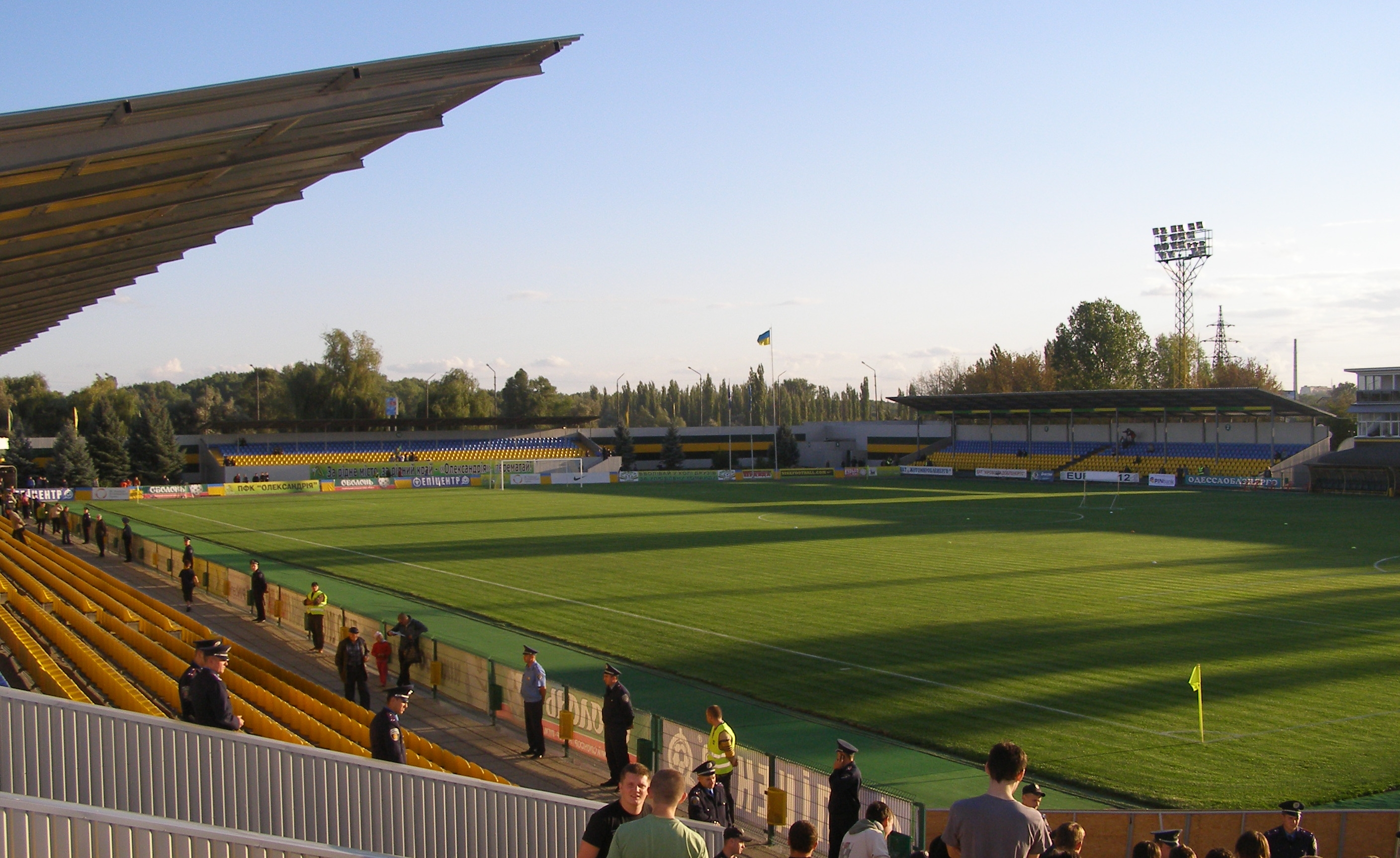
Nika Stadium (former Shakhtar Stadium)

The club plays its games at the Sports Complex "Nika" that was built in place of the old Shakhtar Stadium. At the new stadium Oleksandriya plays since summer of 1998.

Since 1992 Oleksandriya, at that time Polihraftekhnika, was forced to play at another city stadium "Olimp" which is located on western outskirts of the city. FC Shakhtar Oleksandriya denied its city rival to play at its home stadium "Shakhtar" which was located in the center of the city. After Shakhtar Oleksandriya became defunct, its stadium was demolished and on its place was built sports complex "Nika" which was hand over to Polihraftekhnika in 1998.

== Kirovohrad Oblast rivalry ==
A regional rivalry exists with FC Zirka Kropyvnytskyi.

Year	Tournament	Home	Away	Score
01.10.1994	Ukrainian First League	FC Zirka-NIBAS Kirovohrad	FC Polihraftekhnika Oleksandriya	3:2
17.05.1995	Ukrainian First League	FC Polihraftekhnika Oleksandriya	FC Zirka-NIBAS Kirovohrad	0:0
05.10.2000	Ukrainian First League	FC Zirka Kirovohrad	FC Polihraftekhnika Oleksandriya	1:1
23.04.2001	Ukrainian First League	FC Polihraftekhnika Oleksandriya	FC Zirka Kirovohrad	1:0
15.08.2004	Ukrainian Second League	FC Zirka Kirovohrad	PFC Oleksandriya	2:1
05.06.2005	Ukrainian Second League	PFC Oleksandriya	FC Zirka Kirovohrad	3:1
22.10.2005	Ukrainian Second League	FC Zirka Kirovohrad	PFC Oleksandriya	0:5
29.05.2006	Ukrainian Second League	PFC Oleksandriya	FC Zirka Kirovohrad	3:1
17.10.2009	Ukrainian First League	PFC Oleksandriya	FC Zirka Kirovohrad	1:1
28.05.2010	Ukrainian First League	FC Zirka Kirovohrad	PFC Oleksandriya	0:2
15.10.2010	Ukrainian First League	PFC Oleksandriya	FC Zirka Kirovohrad	2:1
03.06.2011	Ukrainian First League	FC Zirka Kirovohrad	PFC Oleksandriya	1:1
20.10.2012	Ukrainian First League	PFC Oleksandriya	FC Zirka Kirovohrad	1:1
31.05.2013	Ukrainian First League	FC Zirka Kirovohrad	PFC Oleksandriya	1:4
11.10.2013	Ukrainian First League	PFC Oleksandriya	FC Zirka Kirovohrad	0:0
22.05.2014	Ukrainian First League	FC Zirka Kirovohrad	PFC Oleksandriya	1:1
05.10.2014	Ukrainian First League	FC Zirka Kirovohrad	PFC Oleksandriya	0:0
10.05.2015	Ukrainian First League	PFC Oleksandriya	FC Zirka Kirovohrad	2:1
28.08.2016	Ukrainian Premier League	FC Oleksandriya	FC Zirka Kropyvnytskyi	4:0
04.12.2016	Ukrainian Premier League	FC Zirka Kropyvnytskyi	FC Oleksandriya	1:1

== Team names ==
Emblem PFC Oleksandria

Year	Name
1991–2003	Polihraftechnika
2004–2014	PFC Oleksandria
2014–present	FC Oleksandria

=== Football kits and sponsors ===
Years	Football kit	Shirt sponsor
2001–2002	Puma	–
2002–2003	Puma/Lotto	–
2011–2012	Nike	?

== Current squad ==
As of 7 September 2026

Note: Flags indicate national team as defined under FIFA eligibility rules; some limited exceptions apply. Players may hold more than one non-FIFA nationality.

No.	Pos.	Nation	Player
1	GK	UKR	Viktor Dolhyi
2	DF	UKR	Taras Dmytruk
3	DF	UKR	Volodymyr Adamyuk
4	DF	UKR	Nazar Havrylyuk
5	DF	UKR	Oleksandr Dykhtyaruk
8	MF	UKR	Andriy Storchous
9	FW	UKR	Maksym Tretyakov
10	DF	UKR	Serhiy Buletsa
14	MF	UKR	Roman Kuzmyn
16	MF	UKR	Ostap Prytula
21	MF	UKR	Roman Tolochko
22	DF	UKR	Danil Skorko

No.	Pos.	Nation	Player
25	FW	UKR	Oleksandr Kozak
30	DF	UKR	Yuriy Kopyna
33	GK	UKR	Andriy Klishchuk
35	DF	UKR	Danylo Harazha
40	MF	UKR	Dmytro Chernysh
44	MF	BRA	Jhonnatan Silva
55	MF	BRA	Fernando Henrique
70	DF	UKR	Denys Slyusar
77	FW	UKR	Dmytriy Kremchanin
90	DF	UKR	Danyil Vlasyuk
94	DF	UKR	Oleksandr Melnyk
99	FW	UKR	Maksym Voytikhovskyi

=== Other players under contract ===
Note: Flags indicate national team as defined under FIFA eligibility rules; some limited exceptions apply. Players may hold more than one non-FIFA nationality.

No. / Pos. / Nation / Player	No. / Pos. / Nation / Player

=== Out on loan ===
Note: Flags indicate national team as defined under FIFA eligibility rules; some limited exceptions apply. Players may hold more than one non-FIFA nationality.

No.	Pos.	Nation	Player
17	DF	UKR	Artur Andreichyk (at Rot-Weiß Erfurt until 30 June 2027)
99	FW	VEN	Bryan Castillo (at Carabobo until 30 June 2027)

No.	Pos.	Nation	Player
—	FW	MTN	Papa Ndiaga Yade (at LNZ Cherkasy until 30 June 2027)

== Notable players ==
Had international caps for their respective countries. Players whose name is listed in bold represented their countries while playing for Oleksandriya.

Ukraine

- (Ukraine) Kostyantyn Balabanov
- (Ukraine) Andriy Bohdanov
- (Ukraine) Serhiy Buletsa
- (Ukraine) Bohdan Butko
- (Ukraine) Denys Dedechko
- (Ukraine) Oleh Dopilka
- (Ukraine) Dmytro Hrechyshkin
- (Ukraine) Oleksiy Ivanov
- (Ukraine) Taras Kabanov
- (Ukraine) **Ivan Kalyuzhnyi**
- (Ukraine) Yuriy Kolomoyets
- (Ukraine) Pavlo Ksyonz
- (Ukraine) **Oleksandr Martynyuk**
- (Ukraine) Serhiy Matyukhin
- (Ukraine) Mykola Mykhaylenko
- (Ukraine) Pavel Pashayev
- (Ukraine) Vitaliy Reva
- (Ukraine) Serhiy Rybalka
- (Ukraine) Artem Shabanov
- (Ukraine) Volodymyr Sharan
- (Ukraine) Volodymyr Shepelyev
- (Ukraine) Valentyn Slyusar
- (Ukraine) Roman Yaremchuk
- (Ukraine) Serhiy Zadorozhnyi

Asia

- (Turkmenistan) Konstantin Sosenko
- (Turkmenistan) Andrei Zavyalov

Europe

- (Albania) Tedi Cara
- (Azerbaijan) Emil Mustafayev
- (Azerbaijan) **Pavel Pashayev**
- (Belarus) Dzyanis Kowba
- (Belarus) Maksim Romaschenko
- (Bulgaria) Dimitar Makriev
- (Georgia (country)) Vakhtang Chanturishvili
- (Georgia (country)) **David Targamadze**
- (Latvia) **Kaspars Dubra**
- (Moldova) **Vladislav Baboglo**
- (Moldova) Petru Leucă
- (Poland) Dawid Janczyk

Africa

- (Algeria) Yanis Hamache
- (Guinea-Bissau) **Mauro Rodrigues**
- (Mauritania) **Papa Ndiaga Yade**

== Coaches and administration ==
Administration	Coaching (senior team)	Coaching (U-19 team)
President – (Ukraine) Serhiy Kuzmenko; General director – (Ukraine) Ivan Kuzmenko; Executive director – (Ukraine) Dmytro Kitayev; Sporting director – (Ukraine) Yevheniy Kocherha; Academy director – (Ukraine) Yuriy Koval; Press attaché – (Ukraine) Dmytro Zahorulko	Head coach – (Ukraine) Volodymyr Sharan; Assistant coach – (Ukraine) Maksym Bilyi; Assistant coach – (Ukraine) Serhiy Laktionov; Assistant coach – (Ukraine) Vadym Chernyshenko; Assistant coach – (Ukraine) Dmytro Leonov; Goalkeeping coach – (Ukraine) Andriy Novak	Head coach – (Ukraine) Roman Loktionov; Assistant coach –; Goalkeeping coach –

== Chairmen ==
- 1989–2014: Mykola Lavrenko
- 2014–present: Serhiy Kuzmenko

== Honors ==
- Ukrainian First League
  - Winners (2): 2010–11, 2014–15
- Ukrainian Second League
  - Winners (1): 2005–06
- Kirovohrad Oblast
  - Winner (1): 1990

== League and cup history ==
=== Soviet Union ===
Season	Div.	Pos.	Pl.	W	D	L	GS	GA	P	Domestic Cup	Soviet Cup	Notes
1991	4th (KFK (Ukraine))	1	28	23	1	4	55	15	47			Qualified for finals
1991	4th (KFK (Ukraine))	3	5	2	2	1	5	3	6			Promoted

=== Ukraine ===
Season	Div.	Pos.	Pl.	W	D	L	GS	GA	P	Domestic Cup	Europe		Notes
Polihraftekhnika Oleksandriya
1992	2nd (Persha Liha)	3	26	11	8	7	25	27	30	1/16 finals			
1992–93	2nd (Persha Liha)	6	42	19	10	13	69	39	48	1/16 finals			
1993–94	2nd (Persha Liha)	3	38	22	11	5	62	22	55	1/16 finals			
1994–95	2nd (Persha Liha)	8	42	18	8	16	59	37	62	1/64 finals			
1995–96	2nd (Persha Liha)	4	42	23	7	12	69	37	76	1/32 finals			
1996–97	2nd (Persha Liha)	10	46	17	14	15	55	50	65	1/8 finals			
1997–98	2nd (Persha Liha)	16	42	15	9	18	51	49	54	1/32 finals			
1998–99	2nd (Persha Liha)	5	38	15	13	10	47	51	58	1/64 finals			
1999–00	2nd (Persha Liha)	8	34	13	10	11	34	34	49	1/16 finals			
2000–01	2nd (Persha Liha)	3	34	18	9	7	50	22	63	1/16 finals			Promoted
2001–02	1st (Vyshcha Liha)	13	26	5	8	13	21	39	23	1/16 finals			
2002–03	1st (Vyshcha Liha)	13	30	7	9	14	26	43	30	1/16 finals			club folded
2003–04	Under financial duress club is idle												
PFC Oleksandriya
2004–05	3rd (Druha Liha)	3	26	13	6	7	30	19	45	1/32 finals			
2005–06	3rd (Druha Liha)	2	28	20	5	3	52	14	65	1/32 finals			Promoted
2006–07	2nd (Persha Liha)	12	36	19	4	13	37	27	61	1/32 finals			
2007–08	2nd (Persha Liha)	8	38	14	15	9	41	32	57	1/16 finals			
2008–09	2nd (Persha Liha)	3	32	15	9	8	43	31	54	1/4 finals			
2009–10	2nd (Persha Liha)	5	34	19	6	9	58	34	63	1/16 finals			
2010–11	2nd (Persha Liha)	1	34	21	6	7	55	25	69	1/8 finals			Promoted
2011–12	1st (Premier Liha)	16	30	4	8	18	24	58	20	1/16 finals			Relegated to Ukrainian First League
2012–13	2nd (Persha Liha)	3	34	17	9	8	48	35	60	1/32 finals			Refused promotion
2013–14	2nd (Persha Liha)	2	30	14	10	6	47	28	52	1/16 finals			Refused promotion
FC Oleksandriya
2014–15	2nd (Persha Liha)	1	30	22	6	2	53	15	72	1/8 finals			Promoted
2015–16	1st (Premier Liha)	6	26	10	8	8	30	29	38	1/2 finals			
2016–17	1st (Premier Liha)	5	32	10	10	12	41	43	40	1/8 finals	EL	3rd qual. round	
2017–18	1st (Premier Liha)	7	32	10	15	7	32	27	45	1/8 finals	EL	Play-off round	
2018–19	1st (Premier Liha)	3	32	14	7	11	39	34	49	1/16 finals			
2019–20	1st (Premier Liha)	5	32	14	7	11	49	47	49	1/4 finals	EL	Group stage	
2020–21	1st (Premier Liha)	9	26	8	5	13	33	37	29	1/2 finals			
2021–22 was terminated	1st (Premier Liha)	6	18/30	7	5	6	19	16	26	1/8 finals (was terminated)			began on 24.02.2022 Russian invasion of Ukraine
2022–23	1st (Premier Liha)	6	30	10	14	6	42	39	44	None			
2023–24	1st (Premier Liha)	8	30	8	10	12	30	38	34	1/4 finals			
2024–25	1st (Premier Liha)	2	30	20	7	3	46	22	67	1/4 finals			
2025–26	1st (Premier Liha)	15	30	3	8	19	24	58	17	1/16 finals	2025–26 UEFA Conference League	Second qualifying round	Relegated through play-offs:Livyi Bereh Kyiv 1:1 0:1 (1-2) to Ukrainian First League
2026–27	2nd (Persha Liha)	2	10	5	4	1	15	7	19	1/8 finals	-	-	TBD

== European record ==
FC Oleksandriya played its first game of continental competition on 28 July 2016 in a home loss (0:3) to Hajduk Split. It qualified for the group stage of the competition for the first time in the 2019–20 season.

Season	Competition	Round	Club	Home/Neitral	Away	Aggregate
2016–17	UEFA Europa League	3Q	(Croatia) Hajduk Split	0–3	1–3	1–6
2017–18	UEFA Europa League	3Q	(Romania) Astra Giurgiu	1–0	0–0	1–0
2017–18	UEFA Europa League	PO	(Belarus) BATE Borisov	1–2	1–1	2–3
2019–20	UEFA Europa League	Group I	(Germany) Wolfsburg	0–1	1–3	4th
2019–20	UEFA Europa League	Group I	(Belgium) Gent	1–1	1–2	4th
2019–20	UEFA Europa League	Group I	(France) Saint-Étienne	2–2	1–1	4th
2025−26	UEFA Conference League	2Q	(Serbia) Partizan	0–2 Kt	0–4	0–6

Note: Kt - Katowice, Poland

== Managers ==
- (Ukraine) Oleksandr Ishchenko (1 January 1992 – 1 August 1992)
- (Ukraine) Yuriy Koval (1 August 1992 – 9 September 1994)
- (Ukraine) Anatoliy Buznyk (10 September 1994 – 19 August 1996)
- (Ukraine) Yuriy Koval (20 August 1996 – 20 September 1997)
- (Ukraine) Serhiy Marusyn (21 September 1997 – 30 May 1998)
- (Ukraine) Hryhoriy Ishchenko (1 June 1998 – 30 June 1998)
- (Ukraine) Anatoliy Radenko (1 July 1998 – 12 September 1999)
- (Ukraine) Hryhoriy Ishchenko (September 1999 – November 1999)
- (Ukraine) Roman Pokora (13 September 1999 – 30 June 2003)
- did not exist (1 July 2003 – 30 June 2004)
- (Ukraine) Roman Pokora (1 July 2004 – 4 July 2006)
- (Ukraine) Viktor Bohatyr (5 July 2006 – 22 April 2008)
- (Ukraine) Yuriy Bukel (22 April 2008 – 1 June 2008)
- (Ukraine) Yuriy Koval (2 June 2008 – 27 August 2009)
- (Ukraine) Serhiy Kovalets (27 August 2009 – 12 January 2010)
- (Ukraine) Volodymyr Sharan (31 January 2010 – 22 December 2011)
- (Ukraine) Leonid Buryak (23 December 2011 – 9 April 2012)
- (Ukraine) Andriy Kuptsov (10 April 2012 – 13 May 2013)
- (Ukraine) Vitaliy Pervak (caretaker) (14 May 2013 – 7 June 2013)
- (Ukraine) Volodymyr Sharan (8 June 2013 – 13 May 2021)
- (Ukraine) Yuriy Hura (18 May 2021 – 14 December 2022)
- (Ukraine) Ruslan Rotan (21 December 2022 – 29 May 2025)
- (Ukraine) Kyrylo Nesterenko (17 June 2025 – present)

== Reserves and academy ==
The club fielded its reserve team for the first time in 1992-93 season as Polihraftekhnika-2 playing at amateur competitions.
