= 2025–26 Albanian Cup =

Kupa e Shqipërisë

Tournament details
- Country: Albania
- Teams: 42

Final positions
- Champions: Dinamo City
- Runners-up: Egnatia

Tournament statistics
- Matches played: 46
- Goals scored: 167 (3.63 per match)
- Top goal scorer(s): Aldrit Oshafi; Dejvi Bregu (4 goals each)

The 2025–26 Albanian Cup (Albanian: Kupa e Shqipërisë) was the seventy-fourth season of Albania's annual cup competition, the Albanian Cup. There were 42 participating teams. The winners qualified for the 2026–27 UEFA Conference League first qualifying round. Dinamo City were the defending champions, and retained their title after defeating Egnatia 3−2 in the final. It was the club's fifteenth Albanian Cup title overall.

== Participating teams ==
Kategoria Superiore; The 10 clubs of the 2025–26 season	Kategoria e Parë; Twelve clubs of the 2025–26 season	Kategoria e Dytë; Twenty clubs of the 2025–26 season
Bylis; Dinamo City; Egnatia; Elbasani; Flamurtari; Partizani; Teuta; Tirana; Vllaznia; Vora	Apolonia; Besa; Burreli; Iliria; Kastrioti; Korabi; Kukësi; Laçi; Luftëtari; Lushnja; Pogradeci; Skënderbeu	Adriatiku; Basania; Besëlidhja; Butrinti; Delvina; Devolli; Erzeni; Gramshi; Këlcyra; Luzi 2008; Maliqi; Naftëtari; Oriku; Shiroka; Shkumbini; Sopoti; Tërbuni; Tomori; Valbona; Veleçiku

== Format and seeding ==
Teams will enter the competition at various stages, as follows:

- First phase (one-legged fixtures)
  - Preliminary round: four teams from Kategoria e Dytë will start the tournament
  - Round of 64: the two winners will be joined by 14 Kategoria e Dytë teams, 12 Kategoria e Parë teams, and 2 teams from Kategoria Superiore
  - Round of 32: the 16 winners will face each other
- Second phase
  - Round of 16 (one-legged): the eight winners will be joined by Kategoria Superiore clubs, seeded 1–8
  - Quarter-finals (two-legged): the eight winners will face each other
  - Semi-finals (two-legged): the four winners will face each other
  - Final (one-legged): the two winners will face each other

== Round dates ==
Phase	Round	Clubs remaining	Clubs involved	From previous round	Entries in this round	First leg	Second leg
First stage	Preliminary round	42	4	none	4	1 October 2025	
First stage	Round of 64	40	32	2	30	14 & 15 October 2025	
First stage	Round of 32	24	16	16	none	18 & 19 November 2025	
Second stage	Round of 16	16	16	8	8	10 January 2026	
Second stage	Quarter-finals	8	8	8	none	10 & 11 February 2026	4 March 2026
Second stage	Semi-finals	4	4	4	none	8 April 2026	22 & 23 April 2026
Second stage	Final	2	2	2	none	13 May 2026	

== Preliminary round ==
A total of four teams from Kategoria e Dytë competed in this round, two of which advanced.

Team 1	Score	Team 2
Adriatiku (III)	2−4	Basania (III)
Këlcyra (III)	2−1	Gramshi (III)

1 October 2025	Adriatiku	2−4	Basania	Internacional Complex, Pezë Helmës
13:30	Lala 16'; Hasani 88'		Elbasani 3'; Kufu 59', 85'; Baçina 90'	Referee: Mikele Dyrmishi

Basania advanced to the round of 64.

1 October 2025	Këlcyra	2−1	Gramshi	Demir Allamani Stadium, Këlcyrë
13:30	Yakubu 22'; Teka 46'		Mashi 62'	Referee: Hekuran Arapi

Këlcyra advanced to the round of 64.

== Round of 64 ==
A total of 32 teams (2 winners from the preliminary round, 14 teams from Kategoria e Dytë, 12 teams from Kategoria e Parë and 2 Kategoria Superiore teams) competed in this round, 16 of which advanced to the second round.

Team 1	Score	Team 2
Skënderbeu (II)	5−2 (a.e.t.)	Basania (III)
Laçi (II)	3−0	Këlcyra (III)
Vora (I)	6−2	Maliqi (III)
Flamurtari (I)	5−0	Naftëtari (III)
Besa (II)	5−0	Shkumbini (III)
Pogradeci (II)	4−0	Delvina (III)
Burreli (II)	3−1	Shiroka (III)
Apolonia (II)	3−0	Besëlidhja (III)
Lushnja (II)	2−1	Butrinti (III)
Kastrioti (II)	3−2	Devolli (III)
Korabi (II)	4−1	Veleçiku (III)
Kukësi (II)	3−1 (a.e.t.)	Tërbuni (III)
Valbona (III)	w/o	Tomori (III)
Erzeni (III)	0−2	Sopoti (III)
Luftëtari (II)	2−0	Oriku (III)
Iliria (II)	5−1	Luzi 2008 (III)

15 October 2025	Skënderbeu	5−2 (a.e.t.)	Basania	Skënderbeu Stadium, Korçë
13:30	Ukiçi 8', 65'; Ramos 97'; Nasto 110'; Abiodoun 113'		Toma 50'; Zefi 88'	Referee: Florjan Hysa

Skënderbeu advanced to the round of 32.

14 October 2025	Laçi	3−0	Këlcyra	Fusha e Sportit Ahmetaq, Ahmetaq
13:30	Kalaj 2'; Myrta 38'; Muhammad 69'			Referee: Andi Toska

Laçi advanced to the round of 32.

15 October 2025	Vora	6−2	Maliqi	Fusha e Sportit Ahmetaq, Ahmetaq
13:30	Folahan 41', 56'; Tabaku 42', 57'; Geci 71'; Fazlagikj 83'		Kame 15', 82'	Referee: Mikele Dyrmishi

Vora advanced to the round of 32.

15 October 2025	Flamurtari	5−0	Naftëtari	Oriku Stadium, Orikum
13:30	Ememe 40'; Murataj 51'; Oshafi 56'; Ramani 61'; Diawara 78'			Referee: Hekuran Arapi

Flamurtari advanced to the round of 32.

15 October 2025	Besa	5−0	Shkumbini	Fusha e Vjetër, Kavajë
13:30	Migone 24'; Treni 48', 51'; Brandão 79'; Chinwendu 88'			Referee: Kristi Hoxha

Besa advanced to the round of 32.

15 October 2025	Pogradeci	4−0	Delvina	Gjorgji Kyçyku Stadium, Pogradec
13:30	Kazeem 2'; Krasniqi 18'; Samake 66'; Zguro 77'			Referee: Jetmir Potka

Pogradeci advanced to the round of 32.

15 October 2025	Burreli	3−1	Shiroka	Liri Ballabani Stadium, Burrel
13:30	Murra 14'; Hoti 30' (pen.); Rrapi 83'		Ogungbire 52'	Referee: Armir Qaushi

Burreli advanced to the round of 32.

15 October 2025	Apolonia	3−0	Besëlidhja	Loni Papuçiu Stadium, Fier
13:30	Umejiego 5', 11', 66'			Referee: Mehmet Koçi

Apolonia advanced to the round of 32.

15 October 2025	Lushnja	2−1	Butrinti	Fusha e Plugut, Plug
13:30	Ribaudo 68'; Çamko 80'		Diop 88'	Referee: Saed Kazazi

Lushnja advanced to the round of 32.

15 October 2025	Kastrioti	3−2	Devolli	National Sports Centre, Kamëz
13:30	Hoxha 72' (pen.); Kasmollari 78', 84'		Anderson 30'; Ivani 73'	Referee: Klajdi Qëndraj

Kastrioti advanced to the round of 32.

14 October 2025	Korabi	4−1	Veleçiku	Internacional Complex, Pezë Helmës
13:30	Kuka 17'; Tepshi 51'; Goga 66'; Halilaj 78'		Banushaj 27'	Referee: Sokol Bebja

Korabi advanced to the round of 32.

15 October 2025	Kukësi	3−1 (a.e.t.)	Tërbuni	Kukës Arena, Kukës
13:30	Grezda 23'; Pecani 117'; Sefa 120+2'		Karaj 45'	Referee: Bekris Dragusha

Kukësi advanced to the round of 32.

15 October 2025	Valbona	Cancelled	Tomori

Tomori advanced to the round of 32.

15 October 2025	Erzeni	0−2	Sopoti	Tofik Jashari Stadium, Shijak
13:30			Eyoh 14'; Aminu 90'	Referee: Ermal Gryka

Sopoti advanced to the round of 32.

15 October 2025	Luftëtari	2−0	Oriku	Gjirokastra Stadium, Gjirokastër
13:30	Zani 27'; Ziaj 45'			Referee: Rigert Zeneli

Luftëtari advanced to the round of 32.

15 October 2025	Iliria	5−1	Luzi 2008	Redi Maloku Stadium, Fushë-Krujë
13:30	Pjetri 16' (pen.); Demiraj 25'; Lika 60'; Osikel 72'; Veriu 80'		Alushi 18'	Referee: Egli Menkshi

Iliria advanced to the round of 32.

== Round of 32 ==
The 16 winning teams from the first round competed in the second round, 8 of which advanced to the round of 16.

Team 1	Score	Team 2
Skënderbeu (II)	4−2	Iliria (II)
Laçi (II)	2−0	Luftëtari (II)
Vora (I)	2−1	Sopoti (III)
Flamurtari (I)	9−0	Tomori (III)
Besa (II)	3−1	Kukësi (II)
Pogradeci (II)	4−3	Korabi (II)
Burreli (II)	5−2	Kastrioti (II)
Apolonia (II)	3−2	Lushnja (II)

19 November 2025	Skënderbeu	4−2	Iliria	Skënderbeu Stadium, Korçë
13:00	Abiodoun 40'; Çuçka 48', 90'; Estrela 78'		Kithambo 14'; Veriu 75'	Referee: Ardit Merdanaj

Skënderbeu advanced to the round of 16.

18 November 2025	Laçi	2−0	Luftëtari	Fusha e Sportit Ahmetaq, Ahmetaq
13:00	Bibo 14' (pen.); Ajazi 90+1'			Referee: Albano Stolaj

Laçi advanced to the round of 16.

19 November 2025	Vora	2−1	Sopoti	Fusha e Sportit Ahmetaq, Ahmetaq
13:00	Felipe 29'; Fazlagikj 52'		Myslimi 19'	Referee: Ervin Kotemelo

Vora advanced to the round of 16.

18 November 2025	Flamurtari	9−0	Tomori	Oriku Stadium, Orikum
13:00	Ramírez 29', 40', 52'; Oshafi 35', 36'; Baeten 68', 87'; Lushaj 78', 90+1'			Referee: Eglantina Pjetrushaj

Flamurtari advanced to the round of 16.

19 November 2025	Besa	3−1	Kukësi	Fusha e Vjetër, Kavajë
13:00	Beqja 14'; Danaj 36'; Cordeiro 45'		Ballhysa 54'	Referee: Djonis Kushta

Besa advanced to the round of 16.

19 November 2025	Pogradeci	4−3	Korabi	Gjorgji Kyçyku Stadium, Pogradec
13:00	Krasniqi 13'; Rodríguez 43'; Ezekiel 58'; Spahiu 83' (o.g.)		Marku 44'; Boçka 74'; Zeqiraj 85'	Referee: Mikele Dyrmishi

Pogradeci advanced to the round of 16.

19 November 2025	Burreli	5−2	Kastrioti	Liri Ballabani Stadium, Burrel
13:00	Xhabrahimi 1', 65'; Fetaj 2'; Arango 27'; Dedgjonaj 74'		Zaçe 75'; Halilaj 82'	Referee: Mehmet Koçi

Burreli advanced to the round of 16.

19 November 2025	Apolonia	3−2	Lushnja	Loni Papuçiu Stadium, Fier
13:00	Mahmutaj 5'; Rakipaj 39'; Asllanaj 66' (pen.)		Unuigbeje 73', 90'	Referee: Daniel Vrapi

Apolonia advanced to the round of 16.

=== Bracket ===
Round of 16
Tirana (a.e.t.)	2
Skënderbeu	1
Dinamo City	3
Besa	0
Bylis (a.e.t.)	3
Laçi	2
Vllaznia	1
Pogradeci	0
Teuta	2
Vora	0
Egnatia	1
Apolonia	0
Elbasani (a.e.t.)	2
Flamurtari	1
Partizani	3
Burreli	0

Quarter-finals
Tirana	0	0	0
Dinamo City	2	2	4
Bylis	0	1	1
Vllaznia	1	2	3
Teuta	1	0	1
Egnatia	2	0	2
Elbasani (a.e.t.)	0	3	3
Partizani	1	1	2

Semi-finals
Dinamo City	1	1	2
Vllaznia	1	0	1
Egnatia (p)	1	1	2 (4)
Elbasani	1	1	2 (2)

Final
Dinamo City	3
Egnatia	2

== Round of 16 ==
The round of 16 matches were played between the eight winners from the second round and clubs seeded 1–8 in the 2024–25 Kategoria Superiore.

10 January 2026	Tirana	2−1 (a.e.t.)	Skënderbeu	Selman Stërmasi Stadium, Tirana
13:00	Myslovič 41'; Tare 116'		Janaqi 90+1'	Referee: Daniel Vrapi

Tirana advanced to the quarter finals.

10 January 2026	Teuta	2−0	Vora	Niko Dovana Stadium, Durrës
16:00	Jürgens 17'; Toli 52'			Referee: Dorjan Maletaj

Teuta advanced to the quarter finals.

10 January 2026	Dinamo City	3−0	Besa	Arena Kombëtare, Tirana
13:00	B. Berisha 12'; Bregu 80' (pen.); H. Berisha 90'			Referee: Gerard Çokaj

Dinamo City advanced to the quarter finals.

10 January 2026	Vllaznia	1−0	Pogradeci	Loro Boriçi Stadium, Shkodër
16:00	Gjini 85'			Referee: Klodian Prenga

Vllaznia advanced to the quarter finals.

10 January 2026	Bylis	3−2 (a.e.t.)	Laçi	Adush Muçaj Stadium, Ballsh
13:00	Kodji 15'; Mustapha 61' (pen.); Abdullahi 107'		Muhammad 45+1'; Jiakponna 90+4'	Referee: Olti Çela

Bylis advanced to the quarter finals.

10 January 2026	Elbasani	2−1 (a.e.t.)	Flamurtari	Elbasan Arena, Elbasan
16:00	Lajthia 30'; Ibraimi 114'		Oshafi 59'	Referee: Andi Koçi

Elbasani advanced to the quarter finals.

10 January 2026	Partizani	3−0	Burreli	Arena e Demave, Tirana
13:00	Human 19'; Contreras 44'; Skuka 85'			Referee: Silvio Dyrmishi

Partizani advanced to the quarter finals.

10 January 2026	Egnatia	1−0	Apolonia	Egnatia Arena, Rrogozhinë
16:00	Burić 18'			Referee: Erald Demiraj

Egnatia advanced to the quarter finals.

== Quarter-finals ==
The quarter-final matches were played between clubs advancing from the round of 16.

10 February 2026	Teuta	1−2	Egnatia	Niko Dovana Stadium, Durrës
16:30	Arifi 11'		Adjessa 45+1'; Kryeziu 90+1'	Referee: Laver Alla

4 March 2026	Egnatia	0−0	Teuta	Egnatia Arena, Rrogozhinë
19:30				Referee: Ditmir Grimçi

Egnatia advanced to the semi finals.

11 February 2026	Tirana	0−2	Dinamo City	Selman Stërmasi Stadium, Tirana
13:30			Vila 76'; Bregu 90+3'	Attendance: Kreshnik Cjapi

4 March 2026	Dinamo City	2−0	Tirana	Arena Kombëtare, Tirana
19:30	Neziri 30'; Guindo 53'			Referee: Daniel Vrapi

Dinamo City advanced to the semi finals.

11 February 2026	Elbasani	0−1	Partizani	Elbasan Arena, Elbasan
16:30			Skuka 90+3' (pen.)	Referee: Daniel Vrapi

4 March 2026	Partizani	1−3 (a.e.t.)	Elbasani	Arena e Demave, Tirana
16:30	Contreras 39'		Lajthia 25', 49'; Zé Gomes 119' (pen.)	Referee: Eldorjan Hamiti

Elbasani advanced to the semi finals.

10 February 2026	Bylis	0−1	Vllaznia	Adush Muçaj Stadium, Ballsh
13:30			Kastrati 28' (pen.)	Referee: Enis Dishani

4 March 2026	Vllaznia	2−1	Bylis	Loro Boriçi Stadium, Shkodër
16:30	Balaj 34'; Pusi 44'		Olavio 38'	Referee: Egli Spahiu

Vllaznia advanced to the semi finals.

== Semi-finals ==
The two-legged semi-finals will be played between clubs advancing from the quarter-finals.

8 April 2026	Dinamo City	1−1	Vllaznia	Arena Kombëtare, Tirana
18:00	Bregu 90+11' (pen.)		Charles 42'	Referee: Andi Koçi

23 April 2026	Vllaznia	0−1	Dinamo City	Loro Boriçi Stadium, Shkodër
19:00			Bregu 76'	Referee: Enea Jorgji

Dinamo City advanced to the final.

8 April 2026	Egnatia	1−1	Elbasani	Egnatia Arena, Rrogozhinë
18:00	Sota 5'		Gomes 44'	Referee: Ditmir Grimçi

22 April 2026	Elbasani	1−1 (a.e.t.) (2−4 p)	Egnatia	Elbasan Arena, Elbasan
19:00	Musta 57'		Gruda 11'	Referee: Eldorjan Hamiti
	Penalties
	Kasa (penalty missed); Lleshi (penalty missed); Tsague (penalty scored); Musta (penalty scored)		(penalty scored) Albanese; (penalty scored) Jaime; (penalty scored) Xhemajli; (penalty missed) Kryeziu; (penalty scored) Fangaj

Egnatia advanced to the final.

== Final ==
13 May 2026
19:00

Dinamo City	3−2	Egnatia
Ayodeji 36'; Bregu 42'; Mustapha 84'		Burić 81'; Adjessa 90+3'

Arena Kombëtare, Tirana
Referee: Enea Jorgji

== Top goalscorers ==
Rank	Player	Club	Goals
1	(Albania) Aldrit Oshafi	Flamurtari	4
1	(Albania) Dejvi Bregu	Dinamo City	4
2	(Venezuela) Heiderber Ramírez	Flamurtari	3
2	(Nigeria) Mmesoma Umejiego	Apolonia	3
2	(Albania) Xhonatan Lajthia	Elbasani	3
