= 2022–23 Kategoria e Dytë =

Kategoria e Dytë
- Season: 2022–23
- Champions: Vora; 3rd title
- Promoted: Vora; Elbasani
- Relegated: Bulqiza; Ada; Tepelena; Albpetrol; Memaliaj
- Matches: 233
- Goals: 801 (3.44 per match)
- Top goalscorer: Anton Lleshi (23 goals)
- Biggest home win: Pogradeci 9−0 Tepelena (5 February 2023)
- Biggest away win: Shënkolli 0−7 Vora (18 February 2023)
- Highest scoring: Iliria 10−4 Bulqiza (3 May 2023)
- Longest winning run: 13 matches Vora
- Longest unbeaten run: 22 matches Elbasani
- Longest winless run: 20 matches Ada
- Longest losing run: 10 matches Ada

The 2022-23 Kategoria e Dytë was the 53td official season of the Albanian football third division since its establishment. There were 23 teams competing this season, split into 2 groups. The winners of the groups played the league's final against each other and also gained promotion to the 2023–24 Kategoria e Parë. Teams ranked from the 2nd to the 5th position qualified for the play-off round where the winners played against the 9th and 10th ranked teams in the 2022–23 Kategoria e Parë. Elbasani and Vora were promoted to the 2023–24 Kategoria e Parë. Vora won their third Kategoria e Dytë title after beating Elbasani in the final match.

== Changes from last season ==
=== Team changes ===
==== From Kategoria e Dytë ====
Promoted to Kategoria e Parë:

- Flamurtari
- Luzi 2008
- Oriku

Relegated to Kategoria e Tretë:

- Gramozi
- Internacional Tirana
- Këlcyra
- Klosi
- Përmeti

==== To Kategoria e Dytë ====
Relegated from Kategoria e Parë:

- Butrinti
- Maliqi
- Pogradeci
- Shkumbini
- Vora

Promoted from Kategoria e Tretë:

- Delvina
- Elbasani
- Valbona

=== Locations ===
2022–23 Group A Kategoria e Dytë teams.
2022–23 Group B Kategoria e Dytë teams.

=== Stadia by capacity and locations ===
==== Group A ====
Team	Location	Stadium	Capacity
Ada	Velipojë	Fusha Sportive Adriatik	1,000
Bulqiza	Bulqizë	National Sports Centre	50
Gramshi	Gramsh	Mislim Koçi Stadium	3,100
Iliria	Fushë-Krujë	Redi Maloku Stadium	3,000
Murlani	Vau i Dejës	Barbullush Stadium	
Naftëtari	Kuçovë	Bashkim Sulejmani Stadium	5,000
Shënkolli	Shënkoll	Shënkoll Stadium	500
Sopoti	Librazhd	Sopoti Stadium	3,000
Valbona	Bajram Curri	Tropojë Stadium	
Veleçiku	Koplik	Kompleksi Vëllezërit Duli	2,000
Vora	Vorë	Vorë Stadium	

==== Group B ====
Team	Location	Stadium	Capacity
Albpetrol	Patos	Alush Noga Stadium	2,150
Butrinti	Sarandë	Andon Lapa Stadium	5,500
Delvina	Delvinë	Panajot Pano Stadium	200
Devolli	Bilisht	Bilisht Stadium	3,000
Elbasani	Elbasan	Elbasan Arena	12,800
Labëria	Vlorë	Labëria Complex	
Luftëtari	Gjirokastër	Gjirokastra Stadium	8,400
Maliqi	Maliq	Skënderbeu Stadium	12,343
Memaliaj	Memaliaj	Karafil Çaushi Stadium	1,500
Pogradeci	Pogradec	Gjorgji Kyçyku Stadium	10,700
Shkumbini	Peqin	Shkumbini Stadium	9,000
Tepelena	Tepelenë	Sabaudin Shehu Stadium	2,000

== League standings ==
=== Group A ===
Pos	Team	Pld	W	D	L	GF	GA	GD	Pts	Promotion or relegation
1	Vora (C, P)	20	16	2	2	64	16	+48	50	Promotion to 2023–24 Kategoria e Parë
2	Veleçiku	20	14	4	2	43	17	+26	46	Play-off promotion to 2023–24 Kategoria e Parë
3	Valbona	20	14	3	3	52	15	+37	45	Play-off promotion to 2023–24 Kategoria e Parë
4	Sopoti	20	14	1	5	48	19	+29	43	Play-off promotion to 2023–24 Kategoria e Parë
5	Naftëtari	20	9	2	9	34	26	+8	29	Play-off promotion to 2023–24 Kategoria e Parë
6	Shënkolli	20	8	2	10	40	50	−10	26	
7	Iliria	20	6	5	9	33	42	−9	23	
8	Murlani	20	6	2	12	17	33	−16	20	
9	Gramshi (O)	20	5	3	12	19	42	−23	18	Play-off relegation to 2023–24 Kategoria e Tretë
10	Bulqiza (R)	20	5	0	15	24	61	−37	15	Relegation to 2023–24 Kategoria e Tretë
11	Ada (R)	20	0	2	18	17	70	−53	2	Relegation to 2023–24 Kategoria e Tretë

Rules for classification: 1) points; 2) head-to-head points; 3) head-to-head goal difference; 4) goal difference; 5) number of goals scored; 6) draw. (Head-to-head record is applied for clubs with the same number of points only once all matches between said clubs have been played.)
(C) Champions; (O) Play-off winners; (P) Promoted; (R) Relegated

==== Results ====
Home \ Away	ADA	BUL	GRA	ILI	MUR	NAF	SHË	SOP	VAL	VEL	VOR
Ada	—	2–3	0–0	1–2	0–1	1–4	2–2	1–3	1–4	1–4	2–5
Bulqiza	3–0	—	1–2	2–1	3–1	1–2	4–3	1–3	0–5	1–4	0–4
Gramshi	4–1	1–0	—	1–2	0–1	1–1	3–1	0–2	0–3	1–1	0–1
Iliria	2–1	10–4	5–1	—	3–3	1–1	2–4	1–0	1–1	0–0	1–3
Murlani	2–1	1–0	2–0	0–0	—	2–0	1–3	0–4	0–1	1–2	0–3
Naftëtari	4–1	5–0	6–2	2–0	2–0	—	2–0	1–0	0–1	0–1	2–3
Shënkolli	6–1	3–0	2–3	3–1	2–1	3–0	—	1–3	2–5	0–0	0–7
Sopoti	6–0	6–0	4–0	3–0	1–0	2–1	4–0	—	4–3	0–2	1–1
Valbona	5–0	2–0	2–0	3–1	4–0	2–0	4–0	4–0	—	1–1	1–3
Veleçiku	2–0	2–1	4–0	5–0	2–1	3–1	5–1	1–2	1–0	—	2–1
Vora	8–1	4–0	3–0	4–0	2–0	2–0	2–4	2–0	1–1	5–1	—

Legend: Blue = home team win; Yellow = draw; Red = away team win.
For upcoming matches, an "a" indicates there is an article about the rivalry between the two participants.

=== Group B ===
Pos	Team	Pld	W	D	L	GF	GA	GD	Pts	Promotion or relegation
1	Elbasani (P)	22	18	4	0	64	12	+52	58	Promotion to 2023–24 Kategoria e Parë
2	Pogradeci	22	16	5	1	62	13	+49	53	Play-off promotion to 2023–24 Kategoria e Parë
3	Labëria	22	11	6	5	28	15	+13	39	Play-off promotion to 2023–24 Kategoria e Parë
4	Butrinti	22	11	2	9	26	24	+2	35	Play-off promotion to 2023–24 Kategoria e Parë
5	Devolli	22	10	4	8	47	31	+16	34	Play-off promotion to 2023–24 Kategoria e Parë
6	Luftëtari	22	11	1	10	38	32	+6	34	
7	Shkumbini	22	8	3	11	26	38	−12	27	
8	Delvina	22	7	5	10	26	35	−9	26	
9	Maliqi	22	8	0	14	38	58	−20	24	
10	Tepelena (R)	22	7	3	12	21	48	−27	24	Play-off relegation to 2023–24 Kategoria e Tretë
11	Albpetrol (R)	22	4	4	14	18	50	−32	16	Relegation to 2023–24 Kategoria e Tretë
12	Memaliaj (R)	22	1	3	18	13	51	−38	6	Relegation to 2023–24 Kategoria e Tretë

Rules for classification: 1) points; 2) head-to-head points; 3) head-to-head goal difference; 4) goal difference; 5) number of goals scored; 6) draw. (Head-to-head record is applied for clubs with the same number of points only once all matches between said clubs have been played.)
(P) Promoted; (R) Relegated

==== Results ====
Home \ Away	ALB	BUT	DEL	DEV	ELB	LAB	LUF	MAL	MEM	POG	SHK	TEP
Albpetrol	—	0–0	1–2	1–2	0–4	2–2	2–1	2–1	2–1	0–2	0–3	0–0
Butrinti	3–0	—	0–0	1–0	0–1	1–0	2–1	2–0	1–0	0–2	3–0	2–0
Delvina	2–0	1–0	—	0–1	0–3	0–1	1–3	2–0	5–2	0–0	0–0	2–1
Devolli	5–2	6–1	3–3	—	1–2	0–0	4–1	2–3	3–1	1–2	3–0	4–1
Elbasani	4–1	4–1	5–1	0–0	—	1–0	2–0	5–0	3–0	1–1	3–1	6–0
Labëria	1–0	1–0	1–0	2–2	0–0	—	3–0	6–2	1–0	0–0	2–0	1–0
Luftëtari	2–2	2–1	3–0	5–2	0–3	3–1	—	3–0	3–0	0–3	3–1	0–1
Maliqi	4–1	1–2	3–1	2–6	1–6	0–2	2–1	—	4–0	0–1	2–3	2–0
Memaliaj	1–2	1–3	2–1	0–1	0–2	0–0	0–2	1–3	—	1–6	0–0	1–4
Pogradeci	7–0	3–1	5–1	2–1	1–1	2–1	1–0	7–1	3–1	—	4–1	9–0
Shkumbini	2–0	0–2	0–3	1–0	1–4	1–3	1–4	3–1	1–0	0–0	—	3–0
Tepelena	1–0	1–0	1–1	1–0	3–4	1–0	0–1	2–6	1–1	2–1	1–4	—

Legend: Blue = home team win; Yellow = draw; Red = away team win.
For upcoming matches, an "a" indicates there is an article about the rivalry between the two participants.

== Final ==
11 May 2023
18:00

Vora	2−1	Elbasani
Avdiu 29', 78'		Lleshi 19'

Arena Kombëtare, Tirana

== Group A Promotion play-offs ==
Semi-finals
Veleçiku	4
Naftëtari	0
Valbona	2
Sopoti	0

Final
Veleçiku	1
Valbona	2

== Semi-finals ==
11 May 2023
15:00

Veleçiku	4−0	Naftëtari
Banushaj 48'; Hajdari 57'; Shekaj 70'; Ivziku 77'

Kompleksi Vëllezërit Duli, Koplik

11 May 2023
15:00

Valbona	2−0	Sopoti
Mziu 24' (pen.); Gjonaj 53' (pen.)

Tropojë Stadium, Bajram Curri

== Final ==
18 May 2023
16:00

Veleçiku	1−2	Valbona
Elbasani 81'		Mziu 43'; Gjonaj 56'

Vorë Stadium, Vorë

Valbona qualified to the final play-off match.

== Group B Promotion play-offs ==
Semi-finals
Pogradeci	3
Devolli	1
Labëria	1
Butrinti	0

Final
Pogradeci	1
Labëria	0

== Semi-finals ==
11 May 2023
15:00

Pogradeci	3−1	Devolli
Shyti 40' (pen.); Carlos Henrique 45'; Shkulaku 48'		Nallbati 63' (pen.)

Gjorgji Kyçyku Stadium, Pogradec

11 May 2023
15:00

Labëria	1−0	Butrinti
Muçaj 13'

Labëria Complex, Nartë

== Final ==
18 May 2023
16:00

Pogradeci	1−0	Labëria
Topllari 90'

Arena Egnatia, Rrogozhinë

Pogradeci qualified to the final play-off match.

== Relegation play-offs ==
11 May 2023
15:00

Gramshi	4−0	Tepelena
Romero 7'; Veliu 22'; Murati 66'; Hasani 73'

Roza Haxhiu Stadium, Lushnjë

31 May 2023
16:00

Tepelena	1−3	Këlcyra
Gjyla 24' (pen.)		Shele 3'; Hasa 11'; Balliu 90'

Roza Haxhiu Stadium, Lushnjë

Tepelena was relegated to Kategoria e Tretë, while Këlcyra was promoted to Kategoria e Dytë.

== Top scorers ==
Rank	Player	Club	Goals
1	(Albania) Anton Lleshi	Shënkolli	23
2	(Albania) Ardit Jaupaj	Valbona	18
3	(Albania) Eldjon Topllari	Pogradeci	16
4	(Albania) Arsen Hajdari	Veleçiku	14
4	(Albania) Arsen Lleshi	Elbasani	14
6	(Albania) Jasmin Raboshta	Vora	13
6	(Albania) Mario Mërkuri	Luftëtari	13
