= 2017 UEFA European Under-21 Championship squads =

Football team member listings

The following is a list of squads for all twelve national teams that competed at the 2017 UEFA European Under-21 Championship. Each national team had to submit a final squad of 23 players, three of whom had to be goalkeepers.

Players in boldface have been capped at full international level either prior to the completion of the tournament or afterwards.

Age, caps, goals and club as of 16 June 2017.

== Group A ==
=== England ===
Head coach: Aidy Boothroyd

No.	Pos.	Player	Date of birth (age)	Caps	Goals	Club
1	GK	**Jordan Pickford**	7 March 1994 (aged 23)	9	0	(The Football Association) Sunderland
2	DF	**Mason Holgate** (Note: Capped for Jamaica)	22 October 1996 (aged 20)	1	0	(The Football Association) Everton
3	DF	**Ben Chilwell**	21 December 1996 (aged 20)	2	0	(The Football Association) Leicester City
4	MF	**Nathaniel Chalobah**	12 December 1994 (aged 22)	36	1	(The Football Association) Chelsea
5	DF	**Calum Chambers**	20 January 1995 (aged 22)	17	0	(The Football Association) Middlesbrough
6	DF	Jack Stephens	27 January 1994 (aged 23)	7	1	(The Football Association) Southampton
7	MF	**Demarai Gray** (Note: Capped for Jamaica)	28 June 1996 (aged 20)	4	2	(The Football Association) Leicester City
8	MF	**James Ward-Prowse** (Captain)	1 November 1994 (aged 22)	27	6	(The Football Association) Southampton
9	FW	**Tammy Abraham**	2 October 1997 (aged 19)	4	2	(The Football Association) Bristol City
10	MF	Lewis Baker	25 April 1995 (aged 22)	13	7	(Royal Dutch Football Association) Vitesse
11	MF	**Nathan Redmond**	6 March 1994 (aged 23)	34	9	(The Football Association) Southampton
12	DF	Matt Targett	18 September 1995 (aged 21)	12	0	(The Football Association) Southampton
13	GK	**Angus Gunn** (Note: Capped for Scotland)	2 January 1996 (aged 21)	4	0	(The Football Association) Manchester City Reserves
14	FW	Jacob Murphy	24 February 1995 (aged 22)	2	0	(The Football Association) Norwich City
15	MF	John Swift	23 June 1995 (aged 21)	8	1	(The Football Association) Reading
16	DF	Rob Holding	20 September 1995 (aged 21)	4	0	(The Football Association) Arsenal
17	DF	Kortney Hause	16 July 1995 (aged 21)	8	0	(The Football Association) Wolverhampton Wanderers
18	DF	Dominic Iorfa	24 June 1995 (aged 21)	11	0	(The Football Association) Wolverhampton Wanderers
19	MF	Will Hughes	17 April 1995 (aged 22)	19	2	(The Football Association) Derby County
20	MF	**Jack Grealish**	10 September 1995 (aged 21)	6	2	(The Football Association) Aston Villa
21	GK	Jonathan Mitchell	24 November 1994 (aged 22)	1	0	(The Football Association) Derby County
22	FW	Cauley Woodrow	2 December 1994 (aged 22)	7	2	(The Football Association) Burton Albion
23	DF	Alfie Mawson	19 January 1994 (aged 23)	1	0	(Football Association of Wales) Swansea City

=== Poland ===
Poland named their final squad on 2 June 2017.
Head coach: Marcin Dorna

No.	Pos.	Player	Date of birth (age)	Caps	Goals	Club
1	GK	**Bartłomiej Drągowski**	19 August 1997 (aged 19)	3	0	(Italian Football Federation) Fiorentina
2	DF	Paweł Jaroszyński	2 October 1994 (aged 22)	9	1	(Polish Football Association) Cracovia
3	DF	**Krystian Bielik**	4 January 1998 (aged 19)	0	0	(The Football Association) Arsenal
4	DF	**Tomasz Kędziora** (captain)	11 June 1994 (aged 23)	14	0	(Polish Football Association) Lech Poznań
5	DF	Igor Łasicki	26 June 1995 (aged 21)	5	0	(Italian Football Federation) Carpi
6	DF	**Jan Bednarek**	12 April 1996 (aged 21)	5	0	(Polish Football Association) Lech Poznań
7	MF	**Karol Linetty**	2 February 1995 (aged 22)	5	0	(Italian Football Federation) Sampdoria
8	MF	Radosław Murawski	22 April 1994 (aged 23)	12	0	(Polish Football Association) Piast Gliwice
9	FW	**Mariusz Stępiński**	12 May 1995 (aged 22)	15	8	(French Football Federation) Nantes
10	MF	Patryk Lipski	12 June 1994 (aged 23)	12	0	Unattached
11	MF	**Przemysław Frankowski**	12 April 1995 (aged 22)	9	0	(Polish Football Association) Jagiellonia Białystok
12	GK	Jakub Wrąbel	8 June 1996 (aged 21)	7	0	(Polish Football Association) Olimpia Grudziądz
13	MF	Łukasz Moneta	13 May 1994 (aged 23)	6	1	(Polish Football Association) Ruch Chorzów
14	FW	**Dawid Kownacki**	14 March 1997 (aged 20)	7	3	(Polish Football Association) Lech Poznań
15	DF	**Jarosław Jach**	17 February 1994 (aged 23)	11	1	(Polish Football Association) Zagłębie Lubin
16	FW	**Krzysztof Piątek**	1 July 1995 (aged 21)	11	2	(Polish Football Association) Cracovia
17	DF	**Paweł Dawidowicz**	20 May 1995 (aged 22)	9	0	(German Football Association) VfL Bochum
18	FW	Jarosław Niezgoda	15 March 1995 (aged 22)	2	1	(Polish Football Association) Ruch Chorzów
19	MF	**Bartosz Kapustka**	23 December 1996 (aged 20)	2	0	(The Football Association) Leicester City
20	MF	Jarosław Kubicki	7 August 1995 (aged 21)	7	0	(Polish Football Association) Zagłębie Lubin
21	FW	**Adam Buksa**	12 July 1996 (aged 20)	8	2	(Polish Football Association) Zagłębie Lubin
22	GK	Maksymilian Stryjek	18 July 1996 (aged 20)	0	0	(The Football Association) Sunderland
23	DF	Przemysław Szymiński	24 June 1994 (aged 22)	3	0	(Polish Football Association) Wisła Płock

=== Slovakia ===
Head coach: Pavel Hapal

No.	Pos.	Player	Date of birth (age)	Caps	Goals	Club
1	GK	Adrián Chovan	8 October 1995 (aged 21)	3	0	(Slovak Football Association) Trenčín
2	DF	**Branislav Niňaj**	17 May 1994 (aged 23)	3	0	(Royal Belgian Football Association) Lokeren
3	DF	**Milan Škriniar**	11 February 1995 (aged 22)	3	0	(Italian Football Federation) Sampdoria
4	DF	**Martin Valjent**	11 December 1995 (aged 21)	2	1	(Italian Football Federation) Ternana
5	DF	**Tomáš Huk**	22 December 1994 (aged 22)	0	0	(Slovak Football Association) Dunajská Streda
6	MF	**Stanislav Lobotka**	25 November 1994 (aged 22)	3	0	(Danish Football Association) Nordsjælland
7	MF	**Jaroslav Mihalík**	22 April 1994 (aged 23)	3	1	(Polish Football Association) Cracovia
8	MF	**Martin Chrien**	8 September 1995 (aged 21)	3	2	(Football Association of the Czech Republic) Viktoria Plzeň
9	FW	Tomáš Vestenický	6 April 1996 (aged 21)	0	0	(Polish Football Association) Cracovia
10	MF	**Albert Rusnák**	7 July 1994 (aged 22)	3	0	(United States Soccer Federation) Real Salt Lake
11	MF	Nikolas Špalek	12 February 1997 (aged 20)	0	0	(Slovak Football Association) Žilina
12	GK	**Marek Rodák**	13 December 1996 (aged 20)	0	0	(The Football Association) Accrington Stanley
13	DF	**Ľubomír Šatka**	2 December 1995 (aged 21)	1	1	(Slovak Football Association) Dunajská Streda
14	DF	**Róbert Mazáň**	9 February 1994 (aged 23)	3	0	(Slovak Football Association) Žilina
15	FW	**Adam Zreľák** (captain)	5 May 1994 (aged 23)	3	0	(Football Association of the Czech Republic) Jablonec
16	DF	Lukáš Skovajsa	27 March 1994 (aged 23)	0	0	(Slovak Football Association) Trenčín
17	MF	**Lukáš Haraslín**	26 May 1996 (aged 21)	3	0	(Polish Football Association) Lechia Gdańsk
18	FW	**Pavol Šafranko**	16 November 1994 (aged 22)	3	1	(Slovak Football Association) Dunajská Streda
19	DF	**Denis Vavro**	10 April 1996 (aged 21)	0	0	(Slovak Football Association) Žilina
20	MF	**Miroslav Káčer**	2 February 1996 (aged 21)	0	0	(Slovak Football Association) Žilina
21	MF	**Matúš Bero**	6 September 1995 (aged 21)	3	0	(Turkish Football Federation) Trabzonspor
22	MF	**László Bénes**	9 September 1997 (aged 19)	3	0	(German Football Association) Borussia Mönchengladbach
23	GK	**Adam Jakubech**	2 January 1997 (aged 20)	0	0	(Slovak Football Association) Spartak Trnava

=== Sweden ===
Sweden named their final squad on 30 May 2017. On 6 June 2017, defender Pa Konate was ruled out of the tournament after a thigh injury, and was replaced by defender Egzon Binaku.

Head coach: Håkan Ericson

No.	Pos.	Player	Date of birth (age)	Caps	Goals	Club
1	GK	Tim Erlandsson	25 December 1996 (aged 20)	7	0	(Swedish Football Association) Eskilstuna
2	DF	**Linus Wahlqvist**	11 November 1996 (aged 20)	16	1	(Swedish Football Association) IFK Norrköping
3	DF	**Jacob Une Larsson**	8 April 1994 (aged 23)	10	0	(Swedish Football Association) Djurgårdens IF
4	DF	**Joakim Nilsson**	6 February 1994 (aged 23)	8	0	(Swedish Football Association) IF Elfsborg
5	DF	**Adam Lundqvist**	20 March 1994 (aged 23)	11	0	(Swedish Football Association) IF Elfsborg
6	MF	**Simon Tibbling**	7 September 1994 (aged 22)	27	2	(Royal Dutch Football Association) Groningen
7	MF	**Alexander Fransson**	2 April 1994 (aged 23)	16	1	(Swiss Football Association) Basel
8	MF	**Kristoffer Olsson** (captain)	30 June 1995 (aged 21)	24	6	(Swedish Football Association) AIK
9	MF	**Muamer Tanković**	22 February 1995 (aged 22)	16	3	(Royal Dutch Football Association) AZ
10	FW	Carlos Strandberg	14 April 1996 (aged 21)	11	5	(Royal Belgian Football Association) Westerlo
11	FW	**Gustav Engvall**	29 April 1996 (aged 21)	13	3	(Swedish Football Association) Djurgårdens IF
12	GK	Anton Cajtoft	13 February 1994 (aged 23)	9	0	(Swedish Football Association) Jönköpings Södra IF
13	DF	Isak Ssewankambo	27 February 1996 (aged 21)	11	0	(Norwegian Football Federation) Molde
14	DF	**Filip Dagerstål**	1 February 1997 (aged 20)	7	1	(Swedish Football Association) IFK Norrköping
15	DF	**Franz Brorsson**	30 January 1996 (aged 21)	4	0	(Swedish Football Association) Malmö FF
16	MF	**Melker Hallberg**	20 October 1995 (aged 21)	20	3	(Swedish Football Association) Kalmar FF
17	MF	**Kerim Mrabti**	20 May 1994 (aged 23)	14	5	(Swedish Football Association) Djurgårdens IF
18	FW	Paweł Cibicki	9 January 1994 (aged 23)	7	1	(Swedish Football Association) Malmö FF
19	MF	**Niclas Eliasson**	7 December 1995 (aged 21)	1	0	(Swedish Football Association) IFK Norrköping
20	DF	**Egzon Binaku** (Note: Capped for Albania)	27 August 1995 (aged 21)	1	0	(Swedish Football Association) BK Häcken
21	MF	**Joel Asoro**	27 April 1999 (aged 18)	4	1	(The Football Association) Sunderland
22	MF	Amin Affane	21 January 1994 (aged 23)	1	0	(Swedish Football Association) AIK
23	GK	**Pontus Dahlberg**	21 January 1999 (aged 18)	1	0	(Swedish Football Association) IFK Göteborg

== Group B ==
=== North Macedonia ===
Head coach: Blagoja Milevski

No.	Pos.	Player	Date of birth (age)	Caps	Goals	Club
1	GK	**Igor Aleksovski**	24 February 1995 (aged 22)	11	0	(Football Federation of Macedonia) Vardar
2	MF	**Eljif Elmas**	27 September 1999 (aged 17)	3	1	(Football Federation of Macedonia) Rabotnički
3	DF	Jovan Popzlatanov	6 July 1996 (aged 20)	3	0	(Football Federation of Macedonia) Pelister
4	DF	**Visar Musliu**	13 November 1994 (aged 22)	11	0	(Football Federation of Macedonia) Vardar
5	DF	**Gjoko Zajkov**	10 February 1995 (aged 22)	21	1	(Royal Belgian Football Association) Charleroi
6	DF	Aleksa Amanović	24 October 1996 (aged 20)	3	0	(Football Association of Serbia) Javor
7	MF	**Enis Bardhi**	2 July 1995 (aged 21)	11	2	(Hungarian Football Federation) Újpest
8	MF	**Boban Nikolov**	28 July 1994 (aged 22)	21	2	(Football Federation of Macedonia) Vardar
9	FW	**Marjan Radeski**	10 February 1995 (aged 22)	18	4	(Football Federation of Macedonia) Shkendija
10	MF	**David Babunski** (captain)	1 March 1994 (aged 23)	24	5	(Japan Football Association) Yokohama F. Marinos
11	MF	**Daniel Avramovski**	20 February 1995 (aged 22)	14	0	(Football Association of Slovenia) Olimpija
12	GK	**Damjan Shishkovski**	18 March 1995 (aged 22)	6	0	(Football Federation of Macedonia) Rabotnički
13	GK	Filip Ilikj	26 January 1997 (aged 20)	0	0	(Football Federation of Armenia) Gandzasar
14	DF	**Darko Velkovski**	21 June 1995 (aged 21)	20	2	(Football Federation of Macedonia) Vardar
15	DF	**Egzon Bejtulai**	7 January 1994 (aged 23)	6	0	(Football Federation of Macedonia) Shkendija
16	FW	Petar Petkovski	3 January 1997 (aged 20)	5	1	(Football Federation of Macedonia) Vardar
17	MF	**Kire Markoski**	20 May 1995 (aged 22)	13	5	(Football Federation of Macedonia) Rabotnički
18	FW	**Viktor Angelov**	27 March 1994 (aged 23)	13	3	(Hungarian Football Federation) Újpest
19	DF	**Besir Demiri**	1 August 1994 (aged 22)	14	1	(Football Federation of Macedonia) Vardar
20	MF	**Tihomir Kostadinov**	4 March 1996 (aged 21)	10	0	(Slovak Football Association) ViOn
21	DF	Mevlan Murati	5 March 1994 (aged 23)	10	0	(Football Federation of Macedonia) Shkendija
22	MF	**Nikola Gjorgjev**	22 August 1997 (aged 19)	2	0	(Swiss Football Association) Grasshopper
23	FW	Filip Pivkovski	31 January 1994 (aged 23)	10	1	(Swedish Football Association) Landskrona

=== Portugal ===
Head coach: Rui Jorge

No.	Pos.	Player	Date of birth (age)	Caps	Goals	Club
1	GK	**Bruno Varela**	4 November 1994 (aged 22)	8	0	(Portuguese Football Federation) Vitória de Setúbal
2	DF	**João Cancelo**	27 May 1994 (aged 22)	8	1	(Royal Spanish Football Federation) Valencia
3	DF	**Edgar Ié**	1 May 1994 (aged 23)	9	1	(Portuguese Football Federation) Belenenses
4	DF	Tobias Figueiredo	2 February 1994 (aged 23)	15	1	(Portuguese Football Federation) Nacional
5	DF	**Rúben Semedo**	4 April 1994 (aged 23)	8	3	(Portuguese Football Federation) Sporting CP
6	MF	**Rúben Neves**	17 March 1997 (aged 20)	18	3	(Portuguese Football Federation) Porto
7	MF	**Daniel Podence**	21 October 1995 (aged 21)	6	2	(Portuguese Football Federation) Sporting CP
8	MF	Francisco Geraldes	18 April 1995 (aged 22)	2	0	(Portuguese Football Federation) Sporting CP
9	FW	**Gonçalo Paciência**	1 August 1994 (aged 22)	15	6	(Portuguese Football Federation) Rio Ave
10	MF	**Bruno Fernandes** (captain)	8 September 1994 (aged 22)	15	5	(Italian Football Federation) Sampdoria
11	MF	Iuri Medeiros	10 July 1994 (aged 22)	17	1	(Portuguese Football Federation) Boavista
12	GK	Miguel Silva	7 April 1995 (aged 22)	2	0	(Portuguese Football Federation) Vitória de Guimarães
13	DF	**Kévin Rodrigues**	5 March 1994 (aged 23)	2	0	(Royal Spanish Football Federation) Real Sociedad
14	DF	Pedro Rebocho	23 January 1995 (aged 22)	4	0	(Portuguese Football Federation) Moreirense
15	DF	Fernando Fonseca	14 March 1997 (aged 20)	7	0	(Portuguese Football Federation) Porto
16	MF	**Renato Sanches**	18 August 1997 (aged 19)	0	0	(German Football Association) Bayern Munich
17	MF	Francisco Ramos	10 April 1995 (aged 22)	6	0	(Portuguese Football Federation) Porto
18	FW	**Gonçalo Guedes**	29 November 1996 (aged 20)	9	3	(French Football Federation) Paris Saint-Germain
19	FW	**Diogo Jota**	4 December 1996 (aged 20)	8	2	(Portuguese Football Federation) Porto
20	MF	**Bruma**	24 October 1994 (aged 22)	12	2	(Turkish Football Federation) Galatasaray
21	MF	**Ricardo Horta**	15 September 1994 (aged 22)	18	4	(Portuguese Football Federation) Braga
22	GK	Joel Castro Pereira	28 June 1996 (aged 20)	4	0	(The Football Association) Manchester United
23	MF	João Carvalho	9 March 1997 (aged 20)	7	2	(Portuguese Football Federation) Vitória de Setúbal

=== Serbia ===
Head coach: Nenad Lalatović

No.	Pos.	Player	Date of birth (age)	Caps	Goals	Club
1	GK	**Filip Manojlović**	25 April 1996 (aged 21)	2	0	(Football Association of Serbia) Red Star Belgrade
2	DF	**Milan Gajić**	28 January 1996 (aged 21)	16	1	(French Football Federation) Bordeaux
3	DF	Nemanja Antonov	6 May 1995 (aged 22)	12	0	(Swiss Football Association) Grasshopper
4	DF	**Nikola Milenković**	12 October 1997 (aged 19)	1	0	(Football Association of Serbia) Partizan
5	DF	**Miloš Veljković**	26 September 1995 (aged 21)	13	0	(German Football Association) Werder Bremen
6	DF	Radovan Pankov	5 August 1995 (aged 21)	0	0	(Russian Football Union) Ural
7	FW	**Ognjen Ožegović**	9 June 1994 (aged 23)	11	6	(Football Association of Serbia) Čukarički
8	MF	**Nemanja Maksimović** (captain)	26 January 1995 (aged 22)	8	0	(Kazakhstan Football Federation) Astana
9	FW	**Uroš Đurđević** (Note: Capped for Montenegro)	2 March 1994 (aged 23)	27	15	(Football Association of Serbia) Partizan
10	MF	**Mijat Gaćinović**	8 February 1995 (aged 22)	9	2	(German Football Association) Eintracht Frankfurt
11	MF	Aleksandar Čavrić	18 June 1994 (aged 22)	22	2	(Slovak Football Association) Slovan Bratislava
12	GK	**Đorđe Nikolić**	13 April 1997 (aged 20)	0	0	(Swiss Football Association) Basel
13	DF	**Miroslav Bogosavac**	14 October 1996 (aged 20)	0	0	(Football Association of Serbia) Čukarički
14	DF	Vukašin Jovanović	17 May 1996 (aged 21)	10	0	(French Football Federation) Bordeaux
15	DF	Aleksandar Filipović	20 December 1994 (aged 22)	6	0	(Football Association of Serbia) Voždovac
16	MF	**Marko Grujić**	13 April 1996 (aged 21)	12	0	(The Football Association) Liverpool
17	MF	**Andrija Živković**	11 July 1996 (aged 20)	11	1	(Portuguese Football Federation) Benfica
18	MF	Dejan Meleg	1 October 1994 (aged 22)	4	0	(Football Association of Serbia) Vojvodina
19	MF	**Saša Lukić**	13 August 1996 (aged 20)	10	1	(Italian Football Federation) Torino
20	MF	**Mihailo Ristić**	31 October 1995 (aged 21)	7	1	(Football Association of Serbia) Red Star Belgrade
21	MF	**Nemanja Radonjić**	15 February 1996 (aged 21)	1	0	(Football Association of Serbia) Čukarički
22	MF	**Srđan Plavšić**	3 December 1995 (aged 21)	6	0	(Football Association of Serbia) Red Star Belgrade
23	GK	**Vanja Milinković-Savić**	20 February 1997 (aged 20)	8	0	(Polish Football Association) Lechia Gdańsk

=== Spain ===
Head coach: Albert Celades

No.	Pos.	Player	Date of birth (age)	Caps	Goals	Club
1	GK	**Kepa Arrizabalaga**	3 October 1994 (aged 22)	18	0	(Royal Spanish Football Federation) Athletic Bilbao
2	DF	**Héctor Bellerín**	19 March 1995 (aged 22)	10	0	(The Football Association) Arsenal
3	DF	**José Gayà**	25 May 1995 (aged 22)	12	1	(Royal Spanish Football Federation) Valencia
4	DF	Jorge Meré	17 April 1997 (aged 20)	12	1	(Royal Spanish Football Federation) Sporting Gijón
5	DF	Jesús Vallejo	5 January 1997 (aged 20)	7	0	(German Football Association) Eintracht Frankfurt
6	MF	**Dani Ceballos**	7 August 1996 (aged 20)	13	2	(Royal Spanish Football Federation) Real Betis
7	FW	**Gerard Deulofeu** (captain)	13 March 1994 (aged 23)	32	16	(Italian Football Federation) Milan
8	MF	**Saúl**	21 November 1994 (aged 22)	21	4	(Royal Spanish Football Federation) Atlético Madrid
9	FW	Borja Mayoral	5 April 1997 (aged 20)	9	2	(German Football Association) VfL Wolfsburg
10	MF	**Denis Suárez**	6 January 1994 (aged 23)	17	3	(Royal Spanish Football Federation) Barcelona
11	MF	**Marco Asensio**	21 January 1996 (aged 21)	14	4	(Royal Spanish Football Federation) Real Madrid
12	FW	Sandro	9 July 1995 (aged 21)	3	0	(Royal Spanish Football Federation) Málaga
13	GK	Rubén Blanco	25 July 1995 (aged 21)	2	0	(Royal Spanish Football Federation) Celta Vigo
14	MF	**Mikel Merino**	22 June 1996 (aged 20)	5	1	(German Football Association) Borussia Dortmund
15	FW	**Iñaki Williams** (Note: Capped for Ghana)	15 June 1994 (aged 23)	12	2	(Royal Spanish Football Federation) Athletic Bilbao
16	GK	**Pau López**	13 December 1994 (aged 22)	4	0	(The Football Association) Tottenham Hotspur
17	DF	**Álvaro Odriozola**	14 December 1995 (aged 21)	2	0	(Royal Spanish Football Federation) Real Sociedad
18	MF	**Mikel Oyarzabal**	21 April 1997 (aged 20)	2	0	(Royal Spanish Football Federation) Real Sociedad
19	DF	**Jonny**	3 March 1994 (aged 23)	15	0	(Royal Spanish Football Federation) Celta Vigo
20	MF	**Carlos Soler**	2 January 1997 (aged 20)	0	0	(Royal Spanish Football Federation) Valencia
21	MF	**Rodri**	22 June 1996 (aged 20)	0	0	(Royal Spanish Football Federation) Villarreal
22	MF	**Marcos Llorente**	30 January 1995 (aged 22)	5	0	(Royal Spanish Football Federation) Alavés
23	DF	Diego González	28 January 1995 (aged 22)	3	1	(Royal Spanish Football Federation) Sevilla

== Group C ==
=== Czech Republic ===
Head coach: Vítězslav Lavička

No.	Pos.	Player	Date of birth (age)	Caps	Goals	Club
1	GK	Luděk Vejmola	3 November 1994 (aged 22)	2	0	(Football Association of the Czech Republic) Mladá Boleslav
2	DF	**Stefan Simić**	20 January 1995 (aged 22)	5	0	(Royal Belgian Football Association) Mouscron
3	MF	**Marek Havlík**	8 July 1995 (aged 21)	9	1	(Football Association of the Czech Republic) Slovácko
4	MF	**Michal Sáček**	19 September 1996 (aged 20)	2	0	(Football Association of the Czech Republic) Sparta Prague
5	MF	**Tomáš Souček**	27 February 1995 (aged 22)	9	2	(Football Association of the Czech Republic) Slovan Liberec
6	DF	**Michael Lüftner**	14 March 1994 (aged 23)	15	0	(Football Association of the Czech Republic) Slavia Prague
7	FW	Lukáš Juliš	12 February 1994 (aged 23)	3	1	(Football Association of the Czech Republic) Sparta Prague
8	MF	**Antonín Barák**	3 December 1994 (aged 22)	6	1	(Football Association of the Czech Republic) Slavia Prague
9	FW	Tomáš Chorý	26 January 1995 (aged 22)	2	0	(Football Association of the Czech Republic) Sigma Olomouc
10	MF	**Michal Trávník** (captain)	17 May 1994 (aged 23)	24	2	(Football Association of the Czech Republic) Jablonec
11	MF	**Jakub Jankto**	19 January 1996 (aged 21)	4	3	(Italian Football Federation) Udinese
12	MF	Michal Hubínek	4 November 1994 (aged 22)	4	0	(Football Association of the Czech Republic) Bohemians
13	MF	Jakub Nečas	26 January 1995 (aged 22)	4	3	(Football Association of the Czech Republic) Mladá Boleslav
14	FW	**Patrik Schick**	24 January 1996 (aged 21)	9	10	(Italian Football Federation) Sampdoria
15	DF	Patrizio Stronati	17 November 1994 (aged 22)	3	0	(Football Association of the Czech Republic) Mladá Boleslav
16	GK	Lukáš Zima	9 January 1994 (aged 23)	10	0	(Italian Football Federation) Genoa
17	MF	**Václav Černý**	17 October 1997 (aged 19)	10	7	(Royal Dutch Football Association) Ajax
18	MF	**Petr Ševčík**	2 May 1994 (aged 23)	1	0	(Football Association of the Czech Republic) Slovan Liberec
19	DF	**Milan Havel**	7 August 1994 (aged 22)	8	1	(Football Association of the Czech Republic) Bohemians
20	MF	Martin Hašek	3 October 1995 (aged 21)	2	1	(Football Association of the Czech Republic) Bohemians
21	DF	Daniel Holzer	18 August 1995 (aged 21)	7	0	(Football Association of the Czech Republic) Sparta Prague
22	DF	**Filip Kaša**	1 January 1994 (aged 23)	3	0	(Slovak Football Association) Žilina
23	GK	Patrik Macej	11 June 1994 (aged 23)	1	0	(Slovak Football Association) Zemplín Michalovce

=== Denmark ===
Head coach: Niels Frederiksen

No.	Pos.	Player	Date of birth (age)	Caps	Goals	Club
1	GK	Jeppe Højbjerg	30 April 1995 (aged 22)	19	0	(Danish Football Association) Esbjerg
2	DF	Frederik Holst	24 September 1994 (aged 22)	19	0	(Danish Football Association) Brøndby
3	DF	**Andreas Maxsø**	18 March 1994 (aged 23)	20	0	(Danish Football Association) Nordsjælland
4	DF	Patrick Banggaard	4 April 1994 (aged 23)	21	2	(German Football Association) Darmstadt 98
5	DF	Jakob Blåbjerg	11 January 1995 (aged 22)	20	0	(Danish Football Association) AaB
6	MF	**Christian Nørgaard**	10 March 1994 (aged 23)	23	0	(Danish Football Association) Brøndby
7	MF	Andrew Hjulsager	15 January 1995 (aged 22)	22	4	(Royal Spanish Football Federation) Celta Vigo
8	MF	Lasse Vigen Christensen (captain)	15 August 1994 (aged 22)	34	5	(The Football Association) Fulham
9	FW	**Marcus Ingvartsen**	4 January 1996 (aged 21)	8	8	(Danish Football Association) Nordsjælland
10	FW	**Lucas Andersen**	13 September 1994 (aged 22)	26	5	(Swiss Football Association) Grasshopper
11	FW	Kenneth Zohore	31 January 1994 (aged 23)	16	6	(Football Association of Wales) Cardiff City
12	DF	**Rasmus Kristensen**	11 July 1997 (aged 19)	6	0	(Danish Football Association) Midtjylland
13	DF	**Joachim Andersen**	31 May 1996 (aged 21)	3	0	(Royal Dutch Football Association) Twente
14	MF	Casper Nielsen	29 April 1994 (aged 23)	19	4	(Danish Football Association) OB
15	DF	Mads Pedersen	1 September 1996 (aged 20)	3	0	(Danish Football Association) Nordsjælland
16	GK	Thomas Hagelskjær	4 February 1995 (aged 22)	5	0	(Danish Football Association) AGF
17	MF	**Mathias Jensen**	1 January 1996 (aged 21)	0	0	(Danish Football Association) Nordsjælland
18	MF	Emiliano Marcondes	9 March 1995 (aged 22)	13	2	(Danish Football Association) Nordsjælland
19	MF	Frederik Børsting	13 February 1995 (aged 22)	20	2	(Danish Football Association) AaB
20	DF	Jacob Rasmussen	28 May 1997 (aged 20)	0	0	(Norwegian Football Federation) Rosenborg
21	FW	Kasper Junker	5 March 1994 (aged 23)	3	0	(Danish Football Association) AGF
22	GK	Daniel Iversen	19 July 1997 (aged 19)	0	0	(The Football Association) Leicester City
23	MF	Mikkel Duelund	29 June 1997 (aged 19)	4	0	(Danish Football Association) Midtjylland

=== Germany ===
Head coach: Stefan Kuntz

Jonathan Tah withdrew from the squad due to injury and was replaced by Waldemar Anton.

No.	Pos.	Player	Date of birth (age)	Caps	Goals	Club
1	GK	Marvin Schwäbe	25 April 1995 (aged 22)	4	0	(German Football Association) Dynamo Dresden
2	DF	Jeremy Toljan	8 August 1994 (aged 22)	13	1	(German Football Association) 1899 Hoffenheim
3	DF	**Yannick Gerhardt**	13 March 1994 (aged 23)	12	0	(German Football Association) VfL Wolfsburg
4	DF	**Waldemar Anton**	20 July 1996 (aged 20)	1	0	(German Football Association) Hannover 96
5	DF	**Niklas Stark**	14 April 1995 (aged 22)	15	2	(German Football Association) Hertha BSC
6	DF	Gideon Jung	12 September 1994 (aged 22)	1	0	(German Football Association) Hamburger SV
7	MF	**Max Meyer**	18 September 1995 (aged 21)	19	6	(German Football Association) Schalke 04
8	MF	**Mahmoud Dahoud**	1 January 1996 (aged 21)	6	0	(German Football Association) Borussia Mönchengladbach
9	FW	Davie Selke	20 January 1995 (aged 22)	11	7	(German Football Association) RB Leipzig
10	MF	**Maximilian Arnold** (captain)	27 May 1994 (aged 23)	18	5	(German Football Association) VfL Wolfsburg
11	FW	**Serge Gnabry**	14 July 1995 (aged 21)	10	2	(German Football Association) Werder Bremen
12	GK	Julian Pollersbeck	16 August 1994 (aged 22)	2	0	(German Football Association) 1. FC Kaiserslautern
13	FW	Felix Platte	11 February 1996 (aged 21)	0	0	(German Football Association) Darmstadt 98
14	DF	Lukas Klünter	11 February 1996 (aged 21)	0	0	(German Football Association) 1. FC Köln
15	DF	Marc-Oliver Kempf	26 May 1995 (aged 22)	2	0	(German Football Association) SC Freiburg
16	DF	**Thilo Kehrer**	21 September 1996 (aged 20)	2	0	(German Football Association) Schalke 04
17	MF	Mitchell Weiser	21 April 1994 (aged 23)	8	0	(German Football Association) Hertha BSC
18	MF	**Nadiem Amiri**	27 October 1996 (aged 20)	7	1	(German Football Association) 1899 Hoffenheim
19	MF	Janik Haberer	2 April 1994 (aged 23)	6	1	(German Football Association) SC Freiburg
20	MF	Levin Öztunalı	15 March 1996 (aged 21)	12	3	(German Football Association) Mainz 05
21	MF	Dominik Kohr	31 January 1994 (aged 23)	2	0	(German Football Association) FC Augsburg
22	FW	Maximilian Philipp	1 March 1994 (aged 23)	5	0	(German Football Association) SC Freiburg
23	GK	**Odisseas Vlachodimos** (Note: Capped for Greece)	26 April 1994 (aged 23)	1	0	(Hellenic Football Federation) Panathinaikos

=== Italy ===
Italy named their final squad on 6 June 2017.

Head coach: Luigi Di Biagio

No.	Pos.	Player	Date of birth (age)	Caps	Goals	Club
1	GK	**Gianluigi Donnarumma**	25 February 1999 (aged 18)	3	0	(Italian Football Federation) Milan
2	DF	**Davide Calabria**	6 December 1996 (aged 20)	5	0	(Italian Football Federation) Milan
3	DF	Antonio Barreca	18 March 1995 (aged 22)	10	0	(Italian Football Federation) Torino
4	DF	**Daniele Rugani**	29 July 1994 (aged 22)	15	2	(Italian Football Federation) Juventus
5	MF	Danilo Cataldi	6 August 1994 (aged 22)	19	2	(Italian Football Federation) Genoa
6	MF	**Lorenzo Pellegrini**	19 June 1996 (aged 20)	7	3	(Italian Football Federation) Sassuolo
7	FW	**Domenico Berardi**	1 August 1994 (aged 22)	20	3	(Italian Football Federation) Sassuolo
8	MF	Alberto Grassi	7 March 1995 (aged 22)	10	0	(Italian Football Federation) Atalanta
9	FW	Alberto Cerri	16 April 1996 (aged 21)	12	2	(Italian Football Federation) Pescara
10	FW	**Federico Bernardeschi**	16 February 1994 (aged 23)	12	3	(Italian Football Federation) Fiorentina
11	FW	**Andrea Petagna**	30 June 1995 (aged 21)	3	0	(Italian Football Federation) Atalanta
12	DF	**Andrea Conti**	2 March 1994 (aged 23)	14	1	(Italian Football Federation) Atalanta
13	DF	**Mattia Caldara**	5 May 1994 (aged 23)	9	0	(Italian Football Federation) Atalanta
14	DF	Davide Biraschi	2 July 1994 (aged 22)	5	0	(Italian Football Federation) Genoa
15	MF	Marco Benassi (captain)	8 September 1994 (aged 22)	24	6	(Italian Football Federation) Torino
16	FW	Luca Garritano	11 February 1994 (aged 23)	11	0	(Italian Football Federation) Cesena
17	GK	**Alessio Cragno**	28 June 1994 (aged 22)	12	0	(Italian Football Federation) Benevento
18	MF	**Roberto Gagliardini**	7 April 1994 (aged 23)	2	0	(Italian Football Federation) Inter Milan
19	GK	Simone Scuffet	31 May 1996 (aged 21)	2	0	(Italian Football Federation) Udinese
20	FW	**Federico Chiesa**	25 October 1997 (aged 19)	2	0	(Italian Football Federation) Fiorentina
21	MF	**Manuel Locatelli**	8 January 1998 (aged 19)	2	0	(Italian Football Federation) Milan
22	DF	Alex Ferrari	1 July 1994 (aged 22)	6	0	(Italian Football Federation) Hellas Verona
23	DF	Giuseppe Pezzella	29 November 1997 (aged 19)	0	0	(Italian Football Federation) Palermo

== Player statistics ==
Player representation by league

England	36	13.04%	13
Italy	33	11.96%	10
Germany	31	11.23%	9
(Czech Republic) Czech Rep.	19	6.88%	2
Spain	19	6.88%	3
Poland	18	6.52%	4
Portugal	18	6.52%	4
Sweden	18	6.52%	1
Denmark	16	5.80%	1
(North Macedonia) Macedonia	13	4.71%	0
Slovakia	13	4.71%	4
Serbia	11	3.99%	1
Others (14 leagues)	30	10.87%	
**Total**	276		
