= Gjokaj, Albania =

Gjokaj
- Village
- Location within Albania
- Coordinates: 41.36°N 19.68°E
- Country: Albania
- County: Tirana
- Municipality: Vorë
- Administrative unit: Vorë
- Time zone: UTC+1 (CET)
  - Summer (DST): UTC+2 (CEST)

Gjokaj is a village in Tirana County, Albania. It is part of the municipality Vorë.
