= Elvis Kotorri =

Albanian footballer and manager

Personal information
- Full name: Elvis Kotorri
- Date of birth: 30 April 1979 (age 47)
- Place of birth: Elbasan, PSR Albania
- Height: 1.90 m (6 ft 3 in)
- Position: Goalkeeper

Youth career
- 1992–1996: Elbasani

Senior career*
Years	Team	Apps	(Gls)
1996–2004	Elbasani	35	(0)
2004	Shkumbini	69	(0)
2004–2007	Elbasani	69	(3)
2007–2010	Dinamo Tirana	92	(0)
2010	Shkumbini	16	(0)
2010–2011	Besa	17	(0)
2011–2013	Shkumbini	32	(0)
2013–2015	Elbasani	41	(1)
2015	Dinamo Tirana	15	(0)
2015–2016	Korabi	28	(0)
2016–2018	Elbasani	31	(1)

Managerial career
- 2018-2019: Elbasani
- * Club domestic league appearances and goals as of 11 November 2017

Elvis Kotorri (born 30 April 1979) is an Albanian retired footballer who played as a goalkeeper. He is the goalkeeping coach at AF Elbasani.

== Playing career ==
=== First spell with Dinamo Tirana ===
Kotorri joined Dinamo Tirana in the summer of 2007. During the 2007–08 season, he was the first choice in goal, making 33 league appearances, as Dinamo won the title for the 17th time.

=== Shkumbini Peqin ===
On 13 July 2010, Kotorri joined Shkumbini Peqin on a free transfer by signing a contract until July 2012, being presented to the media on the same day.

=== Besa Kavajë ===
In December 2010, Kotorri signed with fellow Albanian Superliga side Besa Kavajë after terminating his contract with Shkumbini Peqin by mutual consent.

=== Return to Shkumbini Peqin ===
In September 2011, Kotorri returned to Shkumbini Peqin for the 2011–12 season after spending the second part of 2010–11 season on loan at fellow Albanian Superliga side Besa Kavajë.

=== Elbasani ===
On 23 July 2013, Kotorri completed a transfer to his boyhood club Elbasani by signing a one-year contract.

On 15 March 2014, he scored his first goal of 2013–14 season via a penalty kick in Elbasani's 1–0 defeat of Tomori Berat. During 2013–14 season with Elbasani, Kotorri was the first choice, playing 27 matches through the season, with Elbasani winning the Albanian First Division, finished in first place with four points ahead of Apolonia Fier.

On 23 August 2014, Kotorri made his first league appearance for Elbasani in 2014–15 season in the opening match against Skënderbeu Korçë at neutral ground Qemal Stafa Stadium, playing the whole match which ended in a 0–1 defeat.

=== Later career ===
On 21 January 2015, during the winter transfer window, Kotorri was signed by his old side Dinamo Tirana for the second part of 2014–15 season, returning at the club after five years. After making 15 league appearances, he left the club on 7 August 2015.

In August 2015, he remained in the first division by joining fellow side Korabi Peshkopi. He left the club on controversial fashion after only one year after falling out with management, especially coach Artan Mërgjyshi.

== Managerial career ==
Kotorri replaced Eriol Merxha as manager of Elbasan after only the second week of the 2018/19 season, but resigned from his post in early March 2019.

== Honours ==
Elbasani

- Albanian Superliga: 2005–06
- Albanian First Division: 2013–14

Dinamo Tirana

- Albanian Superliga: 2009–10
