= Domje, Vorë =

Domje
- Village
- Location within Albania
- Coordinates: 41.3651°N 19.7298°E
- Country: Albania
- County: Tirana
- Municipality: Vorë
- Administrative unit: Bërxullë
- Time zone: UTC+1 (CET)
  - Summer (DST): UTC+2 (CEST)

Domje is a village in the former municipality of Bërxullë in Tirana County, Albania. At the 2015 local government reform it became part of the municipality Vorë.
