= Breg-Shkozë =

- Village
- Location within Albania
- Coordinates: 41°27′N 19°41′E
- Country: Albania
- County: Tirana
- Municipality: Vorë
- Administrative unit: Prezë
- Time zone: UTC+1 (CET)
  - Summer (DST): UTC+2 (CEST)

Breg-Shkozë is a village in Tirana County, Albania, formerly part of the municipality of Prezë. Following the 2015 local government reform, it became part of the municipality of Vorë.
