= Eriol =

Eriol may refer to:

- Ælfwine of England, a character of J. R. R. Tolkien that the Elves call Eriol
- Eriol Hiiragizawa, character from the manga and anime of Cardcaptor Sakura
- Eriol Merxha (born 1979), KS Kastrioti Krujë footballer
