= Aleksovski =

Aleksovski is a surname. Notable people with the surname include:

- Zlatko Aleksovski (born 1960), Bosnian Croat prison commander
- Igor Aleksovski (born 1995), Macedonian footballer
