= Fushë-Prezë =

- Village
- Location within Albania
- Coordinates: 41°25′30″N 19°41′10″E
- Country: Albania
- County: Tirana
- Municipality: Vorë
- Administrative unit: Prezë
- Time zone: UTC+1 (CET)
  - Summer (DST): UTC+2 (CEST)

Fushë-Prezë is a village in the former municipality of Prezë in Tirana County, Albania. At the 2015 local government reform it became part of the municipality Vorë. The etymology of Fushë-Prezë from the Albanian language translates to in English as “Field of Prezë”.
