= Arsen Kasa =

Albanian footballer

Personal information
- Full name: Arsen Kasa
- Date of birth: 2 May 1997 (age 29)
- Place of birth: Elbasan, Albania
- Height: 1.79 m (5 ft 10 in)
- Position: Midfielder

Team information
- Current team: Elbasani
- Number: 18

Youth career
- 2011–2017: KF Elbasani

Senior career*
Years	Team	Apps	(Gls)
2015–2017	Elbasani	50	(2)
2017–2018	Luftëtari	0	(0)
2018-2022	Pogradeci	89	(3)
2022-	Elbasani	87	(4)
- * Club domestic league appearances and goals as of 24 June 2026

Arsen Kasa (born 2 May 1997) is an Albanian professional footballer who plays as a midfielder for Albanian club Elbasani

== Career statistics ==
As of 25 October 2017

Club	Season	League country	League		Cup		Europe		Other		Total	
Club	Season	League country	Apps	Goals	Apps	Goals	Apps	Goals	Apps	Goals	Apps	Goals
KF Elbasani	2014–15	Albanian Superliga	1	0	—		—		—		1	0
KF Elbasani	2015–16	Albanian First Division	25	1	2	0	—		—		27	1
KF Elbasani	2016–17	Albanian First Division	24	1	2	0	—		—		26	1
KF Elbasani	Total		50	2	4	0	0	0	0	0	54	2
Luftëtari FC	2017–18	Albanian Superliga	0	0	2	0	—		—		2	0
Luftëtari FC	Total		0	0	2	0	0	0	0	0	2	0
Career total			50	2	6	0	0	0	0	0	56	2
