= 2008 Gërdec explosions =

Munitions depot explosion in western Albania

Coordinates: 41.4178°N 19.6311°E

- Date: 15 March 2008
- Time: noon (12:05 GMT)
- Location: Gërdec, Albania
- Deaths: 26
- Injuries: 350+

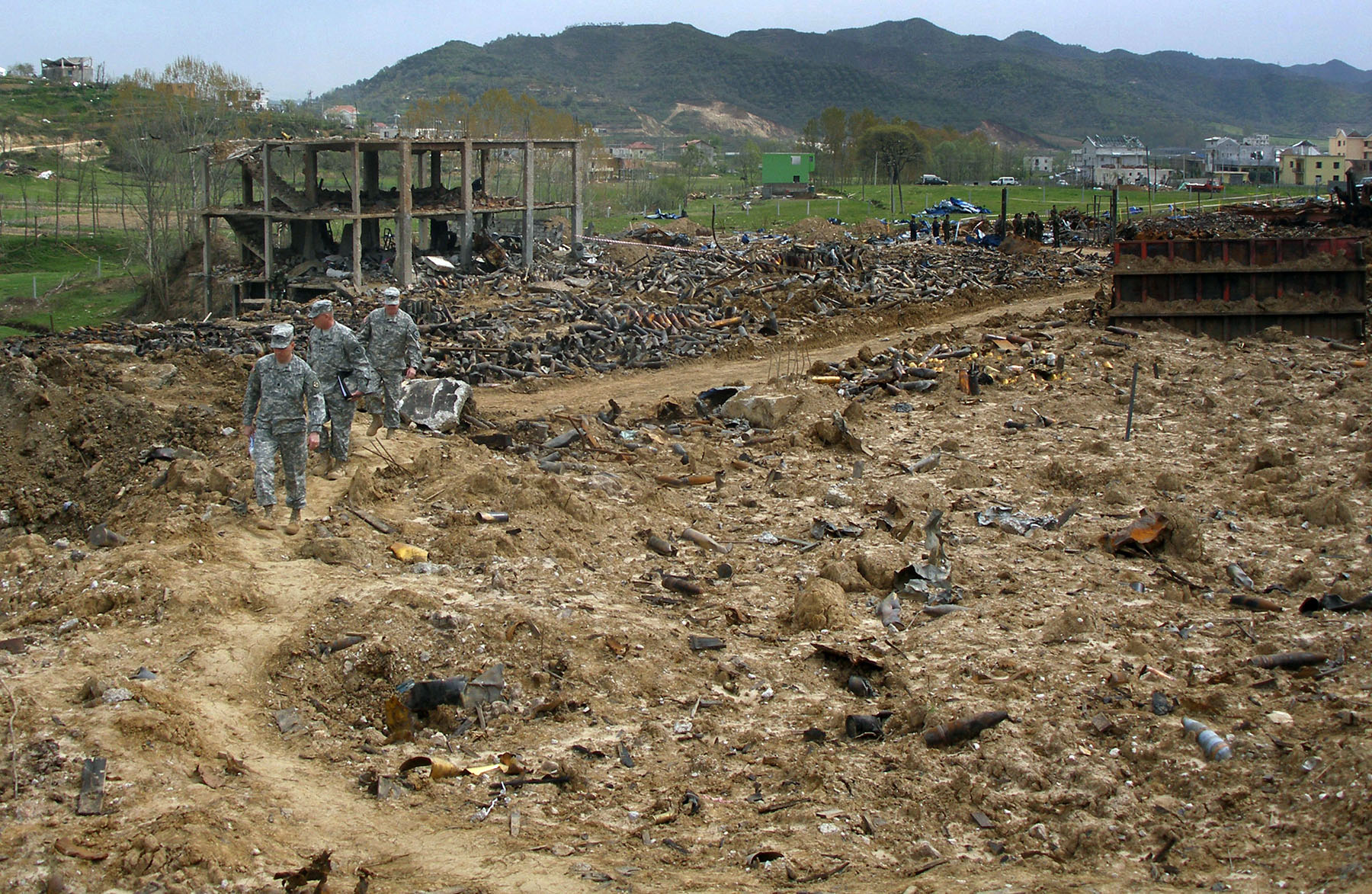
Scene of the accident in April 2008

At approximately 12 p.m. local time on March 15, 2008, at an ex-military ammunition depot in the village of Gërdec in the Vorë Municipality of Albania (14 kilometers from Tirana, the nation's capital), U.S. and Albanian munitions experts were preparing to destroy stockpiles of obsolete ammunition by a series of small, controlled explosions. However, a chain of events led to the entire stockpile detonating simultaneously. Hundreds of houses were demolished within a few kilometres of the depot, and car windows on the Tirana-Durres highway were shattered by the main explosion, which involved more than 400 tonnes of propellant in containers. A large fire caused a series of smaller but powerful explosions that continued until 2 a.m. the following day. The explosions were heard as far away as the Macedonian capital of Skopje, 170 km (110 mi) away.

Thousands of artillery shells, most of them unexploded, littered the area. The blast shattered all of the windows of the terminal building at the country's only international airport, and flight were suspended for approximately 40 minutes. Some of the 4,000 inhabitants of the zone were evacuated and offered shelter in state-owned resorts. The government declared the zone a disaster area. According to subsequent investigations, a privately managed ammunition dismantling process was being carried out in the area.

== Possible causes ==
Possible causes include: human error during the work such as lighting a cigarette or damaging a fuse, improper storage of the ammunition, employment of untrained workers without the proper technical knowledge on explosives, violation of the technical security rules in the area where the destruction of ammunition took place, and sabotage.

Although existing technologies were employed and adapted for the operations in Gërdec, the techniques of ammunition disposal being used at the time were new technologies in this field. An error was made by engineers who designed the machinery as the demilitarization company and associates employed on the project. A fundamental design assumption made early in the design process rendered the basic machinery potentially lethal. Researchers and designers of the ammunition disposal kilns assumed the combustible compounds within the ammunition would burn away at 350 degrees Celsius. Documents available from the US military state, and thermochemical and thermodynamic calculations verify that the combustible compounds within the ammunition being disposed of at Gërdec burned to give out a heat amounting to 4,500 degrees Celsius. Such an energy would, without further sufficient and adequately designed machine components, lead to vaporization and explosion of the machines used to dispose of the ammunition dumps.

== Contracts ==
The repacking/dismantling of ammunition at the dump was carried out by Albanian company Alb-Demil, that had been subcontracted by the Southern Ammunition Company Inc. (SAC) of Loris, South Carolina, U.S., which had won the contract to destroy ammunition in Albania through industrial dismantling.

SAC was contracted in 2006 by the Albanian Ministry of Defence for the deactivation of 100 million 7.62 mm bullets, 20 million 12.7 mm bullets, and 20 million 14.5 mm bullets. A second contract involved ammunition from 40 mm up to 152 mm.

== Casualties and damage ==
Officially, Albanian authorities confirmed 26 deaths due to the explosions: Qemal Deliu, Kore Deliu, Liljana Deliu, Jetmir Deliu, Flavio Deliu (3 years old), Hysen Cani, Muhamet Hoxha, Besim Çanga, Roland Alla, Reshit Kruja, Mehmet Hazizi, Bukurie Cani, Arben Hasa, Zilie Kaca, Endri Dvorani, Shefki Cani, Zelije Leti, Ilirjan Malci, Shqipe Hasa, Azem Hamolli, Nafije Laçi, Zylfije Ahmeti, Erison Durda (10 years old), Rajmonda Durda, Jetmir Ballazhi, and Resmie Kranja.

Albanian officials reported the number of injured people at over 300. According to figures published by the Prime Minister's office, 2,306 buildings were damaged or destroyed in the explosions. Of these, 318 houses were destroyed completely, 200 buildings were seriously damaged, and 188 buildings were less seriously damaged.

== Political consequences and investigation ==
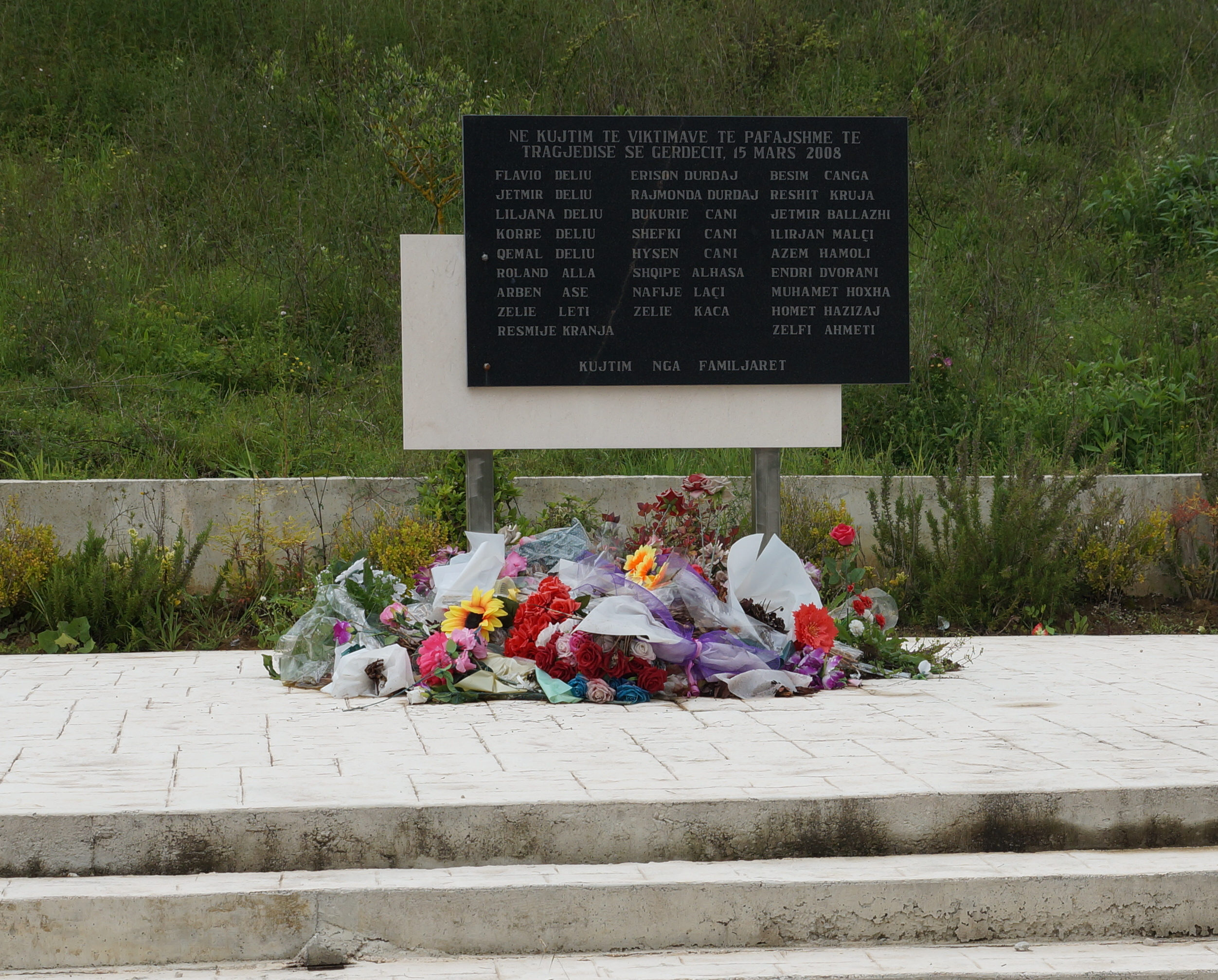
Memorial in Gërdec for the victims of the tragedy

On March 17, 2008, Fatmir Mediu, Minister of Defence of the Republic of Albania, resigned from his governmental position.

As part of an investigation by the Albanian General Prosecution Office, authorities issued arrest orders for Mihail Delijorgji (president of the Alb-Demil Company), Ylli Pinari (director of MEICO, a state-controlled enterprise managed by the Ministry of Defence and authorized under Albanian laws to deal with the export and import of military goods), and Dritan Minxholi (an executive director with Alb-Demil).

A special group of prosecutors and investigators from Tirana, along with experts from the Albanian Ministry of Interior, the Tirana State Police, EOD specialists, military engineers and military police were reported to be investigating the case and collecting witness testimony. The investigation group was expected to publish the names of the officials involved in the tragedy by the beginning of April 2008. The US Bureau of Alcohol, Tobacco, Firearms and Explosives (ATF) accepted a request from the Albanian General Prosecutors Office (GPO) to assist the investigation.

On September 12, 2008, Kosta Trebicka, a whistleblower of the case who had directly accused the son of then Albanian Prime Minister Sali Berisha of involvement in this case, died under mysterious circumstances on a rural road in southern Albania.

== See also ==
- 2008 Chelopechene explosions
- War Dogs (2016 film)
