= 2001–02 Kategoria e Dytë =

Kategoria e Dytë
- Season: 2001–02
- Champions: Elbasani
- Promoted: Elbasani; Besa
- Relegated: None

The 2001–02 Kategoria e Dytë was the 55th season of a second-tier association football league in Albania.

== Group A ==
Pos	Team	Pld	W	D	L	GF	GA	GD	Pts	Qualification
1	Kastrioti	24	19	2	3	60	13	+47	59	Qualification to the Promotion playoff
2	Naftëtari	24	16	3	5	50	20	+30	51	Qualification to the Promotion playoff
3	Besa	24	16	3	5	45	21	+24	51	Qualification to the Promotion playoff
4	Burreli	24	16	2	6	52	27	+25	50	Qualification to the Promotion playoff
5	Albpetrol	24	15	1	8	44	36	+8	46	Qualification to the Promotion playoff
6	Egnatia	24	12	4	8	35	28	+7	40	Qualification to the Promotion playoff
7	Dajti	24	11	2	11	45	27	+18	35	
8	Laçi	24	9	5	10	34	34	0	32	
9	Përparimi	24	9	4	11	29	40	−11	31	
10	Korabi	24	7	2	15	23	51	−28	23	
11	Shkodra	24	5	3	16	26	45	−19	18	
12	Ada	24	3	3	18	16	50	−34	12	
13	Minatori (Rr)	24	1	0	23	19	86	−67	3	

=== Promotion playoff ===
==== Group A ====
Pos	Team	Pld	W	D	L	GF	GA	GD	Pts	Qualification
1	Besa (P)	2	1	1	0	3	0	+3	4	Qualification to the final
2	Kastrioti	2	1	1	0	4	0	+4	4	
3	Albpetrol	2	0	0	2	0	7	−7	0	

(P) Promoted

Team 1	Score	Team 2
Kastrioti	4–0	Albpetrol
Albpetrol	0–3	Besa
Besa	0–0 (3–1 p)	Kastrioti

==== Group B ====
Pos	Team	Pld	W	D	L	GF	GA	GD	Pts	Qualification
1	Naftëtari	2	2	0	0	2	0	+2	6	Qualification to the final
2	Burreli	2	1	0	1	3	2	+1	3	
3	Egnatia	2	0	0	2	1	4	−3	0	

Team 1	Score	Team 2
Naftëtari	1–0	Egnatia
Egnatia	1–3	Burreli
Burreli	0–1	Naftëtari

==== Final ====
Team 1	Score	Team 2
Besa	1–0	Naftëtari

- Besa was promoted to 2002–03 National Championship.

== Group B ==
Pos	Team	Pld	W	D	L	GF	GA	GD	Pts	Promotion
1	Elbasani (C, P)	22	16	3	3	51	15	+36	51	Promotion to 2002–03 National Championship
2	Minatori (T)	22	13	0	9	40	25	+15	39	
3	Minatori (M)	22	11	2	9	39	22	+17	35	
4	Pogradeci	22	10	3	9	29	28	+1	33	
5	Gramozi	22	11	0	11	26	36	−10	33	
6	Delvina	22	9	4	9	31	34	−3	31	
7	Sopoti	22	9	3	10	36	22	+14	30	
8	Butrinti	22	9	1	12	25	44	−19	28	
9	Këlcyra	22	8	3	11	25	48	−23	27	
10	Përmeti	22	8	2	12	17	33	−16	26	
11	Skënderbeu	22	7	4	11	28	34	−6	25	
12	Devolli	22	8	1	13	27	33	−6	25	

(C) Champions; (P) Promoted

== Championship final ==
5 June 2002

Besa	0–3	Elbasani

Selman Stërmasi Stadium, Tirana
