= AF Elbasani =

Albanian football club

Elbasani
- Full name: Akademia e Futbollit Elbasani
- Nickname: Tigrat (The Tigers)
- Founded: 2 August 2021; 5 years ago
- Stadium: Elbasan Arena
- Capacity: 12,800
- Owner: Bashkia Elbasan
- President: Kujtim Llupa
- Head coach: Glen Daja
- League: Kategoria Superiore
- 2025–26: Kategoria Superiore, 2nd
Home colours	Away colours

AF Elbasani (Albanian: Akademia e Futbollit Elbasani), is an Albanian professional football club based in Elbasan. The club competes in the Kategoria Superiore, the top tier of Albanian football. Their home ground is Elbasan Arena.

== History ==
In 2021, the club was formed by the Elbasan Municipality after the disagreements with businessman Arben Laze who was the owner of the first football club KF Elbasani. Due to financial bankruptcy, Elbasani was seized by the Directorate of Taxes in Elbasan. So with the initiative of the fans they found the way and with the cooperation of Elbasan Municipality, AF Elbasani was created.

In the 2021–22 season, they competed in the fourth tier of Albanian football, Kategoria e Tretë. In their first season, they achieved first place, gaining promotion to Kategoria e Dytë.

In the 2022–23 season, AF Elbasani finished first in the Group B of the Kategoria e Dytë, which gained them promotion for the first time to the Kategoria e Parë. In their first season, they finished in 1st place, and were crowned champions and were promoted to the Kategoria Superiore.

In the 2024–25 season, they narrowly missed out on qualifying to the final four, by finishing 5th on 50 points, 3 points behind Partizani.

== Honours ==
- Kategoria e Parë
  - Champions (1): 2023–24
- Kategoria e Tretë
  - Champions (1): 2021–22

== Recent seasons ==
Season	Division	Pos.	Pl.	W	D	L	GS	GA	P	Cup	Supercup	Europe		Top Scorer
2021–22	Kategoria e Tretë	1st	14	13	1	0	84	4	40	—	—	—	—	(Albania) Denis Mici (29)
2022–23	Kategoria e Dytë	2nd	22	18	4	0	64	12	58	—	—	—	—	(Albania) Arsen Lleshi (14)
2023–24	Kategoria e Parë	1st	33	24	7	2	76	32	79	R16	—	—	—	(Albania) Bedri Greca (18)
2024–25	Kategoria Superiore	5th	36	11	17	8	40	38	50	QF	—	—	—	(Albania) Arsen Lleshi (Albania) Emiljano Musta (7)
2025–26	Kategoria Superiore	2nd	39	19	11	9	53	42	68	SF	—	—	—	(Cameroon) Blaise Tsague (11)
2026–27	Kategoria Superiore										—	UCL	1Q	

== European competitions record ==
Competition	Played	Won	Drawn	Lost	GF	GA	GD
UEFA competitions	2	0	2	0	1	1	0

Season	Competition	Round	Country	Club	Home	Away	Aggregate
2026–27	UEFA Conference League	1QR	(Belarus)	BATE Borisov	1–1	0–0 (a.e.t)	1–1 (4-5 p)

== Stadium ==
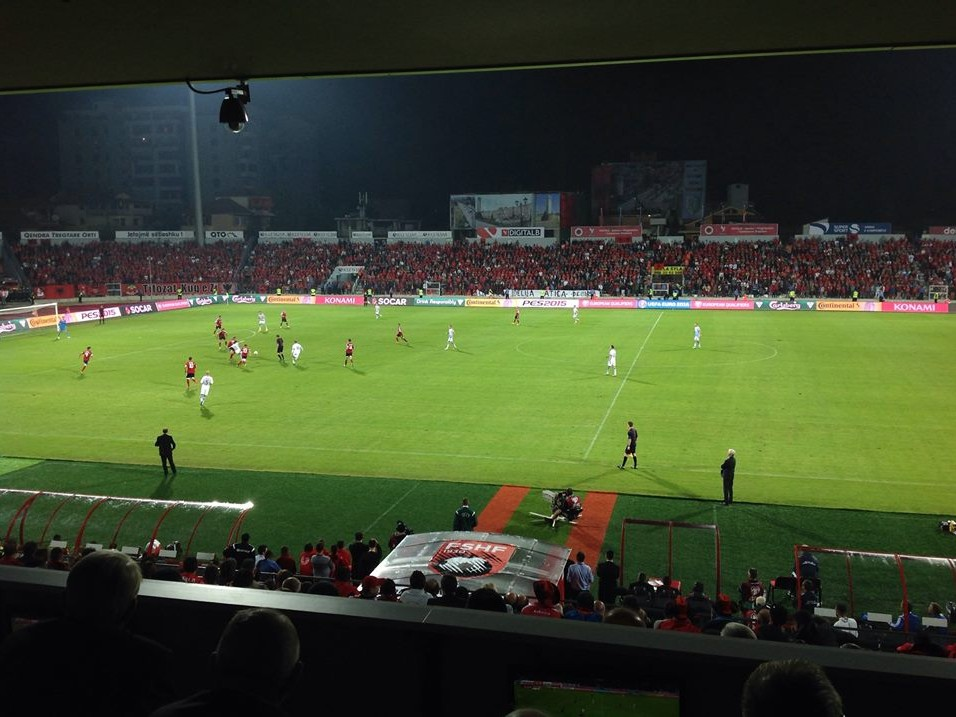
Elbasan Arena Stadium 2014

The club plays its home games at the Elbasan Arena, which was originally built in 1967 and named the Labinot Stadium, after the club Labinot Elbasan. The stadium was previously called Ruzhdi Bizhuta, after one of the club's most famous players. The stadium has an official seated capacity of 12,800.

== Players ==
=== Current squad ===
As of 1 September 2026

Note: Flags indicate national team as defined under FIFA eligibility rules; some limited exceptions apply. Players may hold more than one non-FIFA nationality.

No.	Pos.	Nation	Player
1	GK	ALB	Klevi Totoshi
3	DF	NGR	Ikechukwu Ifeanyi
4	DF	ALB	Bruno Lulaj (captain)
6	MF	ALB	Kleandro Lleshi
7	FW	ALB	Ledjo Tresa
8	MF	MKD	Donart Ibraimi
9	FW	ALB	Rubin Hebaj
10	FW	ALB	Ardit Nikaj
11	DF	ALB	Klevis Kasa
12	GK	ALB	Redon Gega
14	DF	SEN	Moussa Wagué
15	DF	SUI	Yoan Epitaux
17	FW	NGR	Abbas Ibrahim
18	MF	ALB	Arsen Kasa
19	FW	ALB	Atdhe Mazari

No.	Pos.	Nation	Player
20	DF	ALB	Danilo Dine
21	MF	ALB	Ardit Deliu
22	FW	ALB	Arsen Lleshi
23	FW	FRA	Edoly Lukoki
24	GK	MKD	Igor Aleksovski
25	MF	ALB	Bjorsi Gjeli
28	MF	ITA	Ousmane Niang
29	DF	ALB	Jurxhino Zykollari
32	DF	MKD	Filip Antovski
41	MF	ALB	Armir Boriçi
70	MF	SEN	Insa Boye
77	MF	ALB	Bledar Lila
79	FW	SEN	Ibrahima Diallo
92	DF	ALB	Elmando Gjini (on loan from Ballkani)
—	MF	SEN	Cheikh Gueye

=== Out on loan ===
Note: Flags indicate national team as defined under FIFA eligibility rules; some limited exceptions apply. Players may hold more than one non-FIFA nationality.

No.	Pos.	Nation	Player
—	MF	ALB	Glenis Belloj (on loan at Bylisi)
—	FW	NGR	Jisu Jacob (on loan at Sopoti)

No.	Pos.	Nation	Player
—	FW	NGR	Malik Odeyinka (on loan at NYRB II)

=== Retired numbers ===
Note: Flags indicate national team as defined under FIFA eligibility rules; some limited exceptions apply. Players may hold more than one non-FIFA nationality.

No.	Pos.	Nation	Player
27	FW	KOS	Fatjon Bunjaku (2025–2026) – posthumous honour)

== Staff ==
Name	Position
(Albania) Glen Daja	Head coach
(Albania) Orgest Gava	Assistant coach
(Albania) Elvis Kotorri	Goalkeeping coach
(Italy) Andrea Vezzu	Fitness coach
(Italy) Mirko Panico	Video Analyst
(Albania) Denis Asllani	Video analyst
(Albania) Orland Kastrati	Physio
(Albania) Geris Lahi	Physio
(Albania) Mark Doçi	Physio
(Albania) Amarildo Hoxha	Doctor
(Albania) Elton Guranjaku	Sports director
(Albania) Armand Memetaj	Team manager

== List of coaches ==
- (Albania) Gentian Stojku (2 August 2021 – 11 April 2023)
- (Albania) Eriol Merxha (12 April – 6 June 2023)
- (Albania) Nevil Dede (7 June 2023 – 1 July 2024)
- (Italy) Roberto Bordin (8 July – 5 December 2024)
- (Serbia) Ivan Gvozdenović (5 December 2024 – 19 October 2026)
- (Albania) Glen Daja (21 October 2026 –)
