= 2008 Chelopechene explosions =

2008 explosions in Bulgaria

- A mushroom cloud formed shortly after the first explosion.
- Date: 3 July 2008
- Time: early morning (0430 GMT) 06:30 local
- Location: Sofia, Bulgaria; 42.7405°N 23.4500°E
- Injuries: 3

The 2008 Chelopechene explosions were a series of explosions that began early on Thursday morning 3 July 2008 at around 6:30 am local time at a munitions depot in the suburb of Chelopechene, 10 kilometres east of the centre of the Bulgarian capital, Sofia. The initial explosions were powerful enough to be heard in the entire capital and surrounding villages. The depot was part of a military facility (Podelenie 18 250) that specialised in dismantling obsolete ammunition.

== Timeline ==
At 6:28 am, Sofia residents were awakened by a powerful, deafening explosion so loud it set off car alarms in districts as far away as Lyulin, some 15 km from the blast. Further east there was great panic among residents as the shockwave shattered windows and some trees were blown down. There was another powerful blast at 6:45 am. Explosions continued throughout the day prompting authorities to evacuate the residents of Chelopechene, Chepintsi and Botunets. A mushroom cloud formed after the first explosion and rose quickly into the morning sky, obscuring the sun. Smaller explosions occurred after midnight on the morning of July 4.

A total of 1,494 tonnes of ageing artillery shells, rocket propelled grenades, depth charges, hand grenades and other explosives were stored at the depots, the Defense Ministry said in a statement. The communist-era ammunition had been due for disposal by army experts.

=== Panic and first media reports ===
The first official reports of the blast came on the Bulgarian National Radio 7 am news bulletin. TV stations and Internet media also reported that "loud explosions were heard in Sofia but the source was not immediately clear".

Bulgarian Nova Television, which is in close proximity to the blast site, showed residents leaving their homes in panic. Some complained of difficulty breathing. Two men wept on TV, saying their homes were absolutely devastated.

Police and emergency services were inundated with calls from frantic residents. Ambulances and fire engines rushed to the scene but there was little they could do since loud explosions were still being heard in the area.

=== Official response ===
The mayor of Sofia, Boyko Borisov, was among the first officials to arrive at the scene. He arrived and issued a warning to local residents to stay indoors or leave the area and to the inhabitants of Sofia to stay at home, and close all windows.

Later, all residents were ordered to evacuate an 8-km zone around the site for fear of another, more powerful explosion. Representatives from the Bulgarian Red Cross, the Ministry of Emergency Situations, the Ministry for the Environment, the Ministry of Defense, Civil Defense Units and Pirogov paramedics were all at the scene. The first few hours were characterised by many accusations in front of television crews between Borisov and Etem that the situation had not been, and was not, being handled well.

It is an interesting coincidence that a modernised system of the pan-European 112 emergency telephone line had only become operational at midnight on the same day. "Even if we had organized it, we could not have planned it so well," the Emergency Situations Minister told MPs.

=== Injuries and property damage ===
Two people suffered cuts from broken glass and one man was taken to hospital with smoke inhalation. Four soldiers on duty at the depots escaped unscathed.

Damage to the area was extensive. Aerial photos showed that the facility was obliterated. The ammunitions depot and surrounding buildings were destroyed.

Nearby homes suffered broken windows and smashed doors and cracks appeared on several homes. Sofia Airport and the Russian Cultural and Information Centre also suffered broken windows. The airport was closed after debris from the blasts fell near a taxiway.

=== Sofia Airport closure ===
Sofia Airport had to close down as broken glass was reported at Terminal One and some debris landed on the runways. All flights were redirected to Plovdiv International Airport, about 160 kilometers east of Sofia.

== Possible causes ==
By Sunday, July 6 there were already rumours circulating that the explosions were intentionally caused. Defence Minister Nikolai Tsonev said that a fire (such as the one that caused the explosions) could not have accidentally occurred, and if it had indeed been an accident, that "whole blocks of flats would have been toppled". Instead, it was carefully engineered to spare casualties, Tsonev told reporters. He said that information from as far back as 2002 had suggested of wrongdoing at the unit.

Prosecutor General Boris Velchev considers the security of the facility inadequate and intends to investigate why the 1,500 tonnes of munitions were guarded only by two retired servicemen. The commander of the base is also under investigation for improprieties in the auctioning of the products of the dismantling.. On June 10, it became clear that 200 tonnes of munitions had been missing from the warehouses; one version being circulated was that the explosions aimed to cover up wrongdoings.

On Friday, July 11, it became clear that investigations would be carried out on suspicions into the possibility that the explosions were carried out on land due to be privatised.

== Afternoon earthquake ==
To make matters worse, there was a moderate earthquake at 15:12 EET measuring 3.2 on the Richter scale. The epicentre was 15 km south of the centre of Sofia, in the borough of Pancharevo. Residents thought this was another explosion and rushed to the streets in panic, especially those living in high-rise buildings in the Mladost district. Scientists from the Bulgarian Academy of Sciences said it was extremely unlikely that the earthquake was triggered by the blasts. The geological institute also said that there was no link to the blasts. Bulgaria's defense minister Nikolay Tsonev said that there were no underground galleries at the military facility and thus no underground blasts that could have caused the recorded tremor.

== Environmental impact ==
"Large quantities of conventional ammunition are stored in the facility, but there are no toxic chemicals or radioactive substances stored there," said Nikolai Kolev, a former army chief of staff. There was visible air pollution in the area and residents said there was a strange smell in the air near the blast zone.

== See also ==
- 2008 Gërdec explosions
