= Ahmetaq =

- Village
- Location within Albania
- Coordinates: 41°26′N 19°41′E
- Country: Albania
- County: Tirana
- Municipality: Vorë
- Administrative unit: Prezë
- Time zone: UTC+1 (CET)
  - Summer (DST): UTC+2 (CEST)

Ahmetaq is a village in the former municipality of Prezë in Tirana County, Albania. At the 2015 local government reform it became part of the municipality Vorë.
