= Gërdec =

- Village
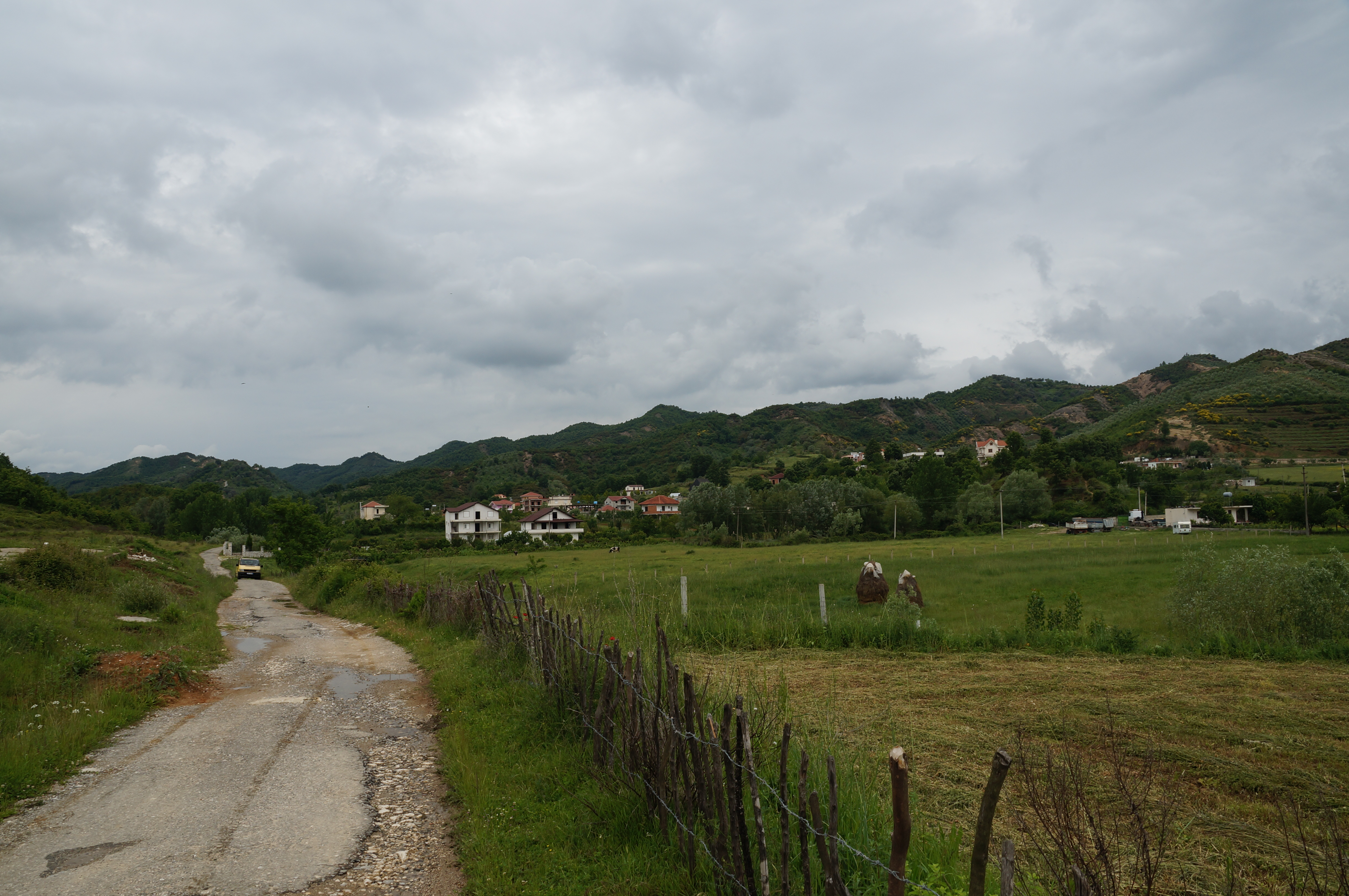
- Part of the village

- Location within Albania
- Coordinates: 41°25′N 19°38′E
- Country: Albania
- County: Tirana
- Municipality: Vorë
- Administrative unit: Vorë
- Time zone: UTC+1 (CET)
  - Summer (DST): UTC+2 (CEST)

Gërdec is a village in Albania that is located about 11 kilometers (6.8 mi) north-west of the capital of Tirana. It is part of the municipality of Vorë. It was the site of the explosions at a military base on 15 March 2008, causing the deaths of 26 people and injuring over 100.
