= Xhonatan Lajthia =

Albanian footballer

Personal information
- Date of birth: 1 February 1999 (age 27)
- Place of birth: Kavajë, Albania
- Height: 1.83 m (6 ft 0 in)
- Position: Midfielder

Team information
- Current team: Elbasani
- Number: 14

Youth career
- 2011–2017: Teuta Durrës

Senior career*
Years	Team	Apps	(Gls)
2016–2020	Teuta	17	(1)
2018–2019	→ Erzeni (loan)	20	(4)
2019	→ Egnatia (loan)	12	(1)
2020	→ Erzeni (loan)	0	(0)
2020–2021	Egnatia	8	(0)
2021–2022	Lushnja	20	(6)
2022–2024	Bylis	55	(8)
2024–	Elbasani	61	(11)

International career
2015	Albania U16	1	(0)
2016	Albania U19	3	(0)
2018	Albania U21	1	(0)
Medal record
Albania
UEFA Development Tournament
Winner	2015
- * Club domestic league appearances and goals as of 24 June 2026

Xhonatan Lajthia (born 1 February 1999) is an Albanian professional footballer who plays as a midfielder for Albanian club AF Elbasani.

== Club career ==
=== Early career ===
Lajthia started his youth career at KF Teuta Durrës in 2011. In the 2014–15 season he played 14 games with under-17 side.

=== Club career ===
On 3 January 2020, Lajthia returned to KF Erzeni on a contract for the rest of the season.

== International career ==
=== Albania U16 ===
He participated with Albania national under-16 football team in the UEFA Development Tournament 2015 and played 1 match under coach Alban Bushi on 3 May 2015.

=== Albania U19 ===
He also was called up at Albania national under-19 football team by coach Arjan Bellaj to participate in the 2017 UEFA European Under-19 Championship qualification from 6–11 October 2016. He played in all three matches as a substitute.

=== Albania U20 ===
He received his first call up for the Albania under-20 side by coach Alban Bushi for the double friendly match against Azerbaijan U-21 on 21 & 26 January 2018.

== Honours ==
=== International ===
Albania U16

- UEFA Development Tournament: 2015
