= Salvador Gjonaj =

Albanian footballer

Personal information
- Full name: Salvador Gjonaj
- Date of birth: 26 September 1992 (age 34)
- Place of birth: Laç, Albania
- Position: Midfielder

Team information
- Current team: Albpetrol Patos
- Number: 21

Senior career*
Years	Team	Apps	(Gls)
2009–2012	Laçi	33	(14)
2012	→ Adriatiku (loan)	1	(0)
2013	Laçi	1	(0)
2013–2014	Tomori	24	(2)
2014–2015	Iliria	33	(1)
2016	Pogradeci	3	(0)
2016	Kastrioti	12	(0)
2017	Iliria	6	(0)
2017	Egnatia	1	(0)
2018–2019	Tomori	29	(0)
2019–2020	Burreli	23	(2)
2020–2021	Oriku	22	(0)

International career
2009–2010	Albania U-19	7	(2)
- * Club domestic league appearances and goals as of 23:22, 7 August 2021 (UTC)

Salvador Gjonaj (born 26 September 1992) is an Albanian footballer who currently plays as a midfielder for Albpetrol Patos. He has also been a member of the Albanian U-21s.
