= Thomas Hagelskjær =

Danish footballer (born 1995)

Personal information
- Date of birth: 4 February 1995 (age 31)
- Place of birth: Copenhagen, Denmark
- Height: 1.88 m (6 ft 2 in)
- Position: Goalkeeper

Youth career
- HEI
- 2009–2016: AGF

Senior career*
Years	Team	Apps	(Gls)
2013–2017	AGF	0	(0)
2017–2021	Vejle	16	(0)
2020–2021	→ Aarhus Fremad (loan)	23	(0)
2021–2023	Aarhus Fremad	62	(0)
- * Club domestic league appearances and goals as of 21 April 2023

Thomas Hagelskjær (born 4 February 1995) is a Danish professional footballer who plays as a goalkeeper.

== Career ==
His loan deal at Aarhus Fremad was made permanent in summer 2021. Hagelskjær left the club at the end of the 2022–23 season.
