= Muçaj =

- Village
- Location within Albania
- Coordinates: 40°46′N 19°32′E
- Country: Albania
- County: Fier
- Municipality: Fier
- Administrative unit: Dërmenas
- Time zone: UTC+1 (CET)
  - Summer (DST): UTC+2 (CEST)

Muçaj is a village in Fier County, Albania. It was part of the former municipality Dërmenas. At the 2015 local government reform it became part of the municipality Fier.
