= Arsen Lleshi =

Footballer (born 1999)

Personal information
- Date of birth: 30 December 1999 (age 26)
- Place of birth: Elbasan, Albania
- Height: 1.80 m (5 ft 11 in)
- Position: Centre-forward

Team information
- Current team: AF Elbasani
- Number: 22

Youth career
- 2012–2016: Fushmbret
- 2012–2016: KF Elbasani

Senior career*
Years	Team	Apps	(Gls)
2018–2020	KF Elbasani	32	(4)
2020–2021	Varzim B	6	(2)
2021–2022	Paradiso	12	(2)
2022	Locarno		
2022–	AF Elbasani	79	(33)
- * Club domestic league appearances and goals as of 24 June 2026

Arsen Lleshi (born 30 December 1999), is an Albanian professional footballer who plays as a centre-forward for Kategoria Superiore club AF Elbasani.

== Career statistics ==
=== Club ===
As of 13 January 2024

Club	Season	League			Cup		Continental		Other		Total	
Club	Season	Division	Apps	Goals	Apps	Goals	Apps	Goals	Apps	Goals	Apps	Goals
AF Elbasani	2022–23	Kategoria e Dytë	18	13	1	0	—				19	13
AF Elbasani	2023–24	Kategoria e Parë	31	12	3	0	—				34	12
AF Elbasani	2024–25	Kategoria Superiore	13	7	0	0	—				13	7
AF Elbasani	Total		62	32	4	0	—				66	32
Career total			62	32	4	0	0	0	0	0	66	32
