= Igor Aleksovski =

Macedonian footballer

Personal information
- Full name: Igor Aleksovski; Игор Алексовски
- Date of birth: 24 February 1995 (age 31)
- Place of birth: Skopje, Macedonia
- Height: 1.86 m (6 ft 1 in)
- Position: Goalkeeper

Team information
- Current team: AF Elbasani
- Number: 12

Senior career*
Years	Team	Apps	(Gls)
2012–2016	Makedonija G.P.	31	(0)
2016–2018	Vardar	17	(0)
2018–2021	Shkupi	26	(0)
2021–2022	Renova	5	(0)
2022–2025	Rabotnichki	93	(0)
2025–2026	Flamurtari	35	(0)
2026-	AF Elbasani		

International career^{‡}
2012	Macedonia U18	1	(0)
2012–2013	Macedonia U19	7	(0)
2014–2017	Macedonia U21	13	(0)
2022–2025	North Macedonia	1	(0)
- * Club domestic league appearances and goals as of 13 May 2026 ‡ National team caps and goals as of 1 May 2023

Igor Aleksovski (Macedonian: Игор Алексовски; born 24 February 1995) is a Macedonian professional footballer who plays as a goalkeeper for AF Elbasani in the Kategoria Superiore.

== Career ==
=== Club career ===
Aleksovski made his senior football debut on 4 August 2013 at the age of 18, by playing the full match for Makedonija G.P. against Vardar in the first round of the 2013–14 Macedonian First Football League. That season, he went on to play 31 games, missing only the last two rounds.

=== International ===
Ever since 2012 Aleksovski has been regular at most of North Macedonia's national youth teams.

He made his debut for North Macedonia national football team on 22 October 2022 in a friendly match against Saudi Arabia.
