= Bërxullë =

Village and former municipality in Tirana, Albania

Bërxull
- Administrative unit
- Location within Albania
- Coordinates: 41°23′N 19°42′E
- Country: Albania
- County: Tirana
- Municipality: Vorë
  - Administrative unit: 15 km^{2} (5.8 sq mi)

Population (2023)
  - Administrative unit: 9,060
  - Administrative unit density: 600/km^{2} (1,600/sq mi)
- Time zone: UTC+1 (CET)
  - Summer (DST): UTC+2 (CEST)

Bërxull is a village and municipal unit in Tirana County, central Albania. In the 2015 local government reform, it became a subdivision of the municipality Vorë. The population as of the 2023 census was 9,060.

Historical population
| Year | Pop. | ±% |
|---|---|---|
| 1989 | 4,030 | — |
| 2001 | 6,736 | +67.1% |
| 2011 | 9,883 | +46.7% |
| 2023 | 9,060 | −8.3% |
