= KF Elbasani =

Albanian football club

Elbasani
- Full name: Klubi i Futbollit Elbasani
- Founded: 1929; 97 years ago
- Dissolved: 2022
- Ground: Elbasan Arena
- Capacity: 12,500
- Manager: Anxhelo Suta
- 2021–22: Kategoria e Dytë, Group A, 7th
Home colours	Away colours	Third colours

Klubi i Futbollit Elbasani was an Albanian professional football club based in the city of Elbasan, that last competed in the Kategoria e Dytë, the third tier of football in the country.

== History ==
The club was formed in 1929 as Klubi i Futbollit Urani Elbasan, the result of the fusion between two clubs, Afërdita Elbasan and Përparimi Elbasan. Urani translates to uranium in Albanian, and the club was named this due to the city's association with the metal. The club changed its name to KS Skampa Elbasan briefly before 1930. They first participated in a nationally recognised competition in the first top flight football league in Albania, the 1930 Kategoria e Parë, where the club finished in 5th place, second from bottom, with a record of 3 wins, 1 draw and 6 losses. The following season they again finished in penultimate place, this time in 7 team league format. In the 1932 champion, they finished bottom of the league, gaining no points after 8 straight losses, which meant that Elbasani were relegated for the first time.

The club changed its name to Bashkimi Elbasanas in 1933, when they were playing in the second division, which they won and earned promotion back to the top flight, winning their first trophy in the process. In their first season back in the Kategoria e Parë, they once again finished second form bottom with 2 wins, 2 draws and 8 losses. No competition was held during 1935 and when the league restarted in 1936 Bashkimi finished once again second from bottom, with 3 wins, 2 draws and 9 losses, but the team below them Ismail Qemali Vlorë played 2 fewer games and finished on the same points tally. The 1937 championship proved to be more successful as the club finished in 5th place out of 10 teams, with a record of 7 wins, 3 draws and 8 losses.

The league officially restarted following World War II in 1945, where Bashkimi finished 3rd in Group B of the new league format, out of 6 teams. The following season they finished 2nd in Group B, just one point behind runners-up Flamurtari Vlorë. For the 1947 season, the league changed to a single 9 team competition, where Bashkimi finished in 8th place. The following season the league returned to the 2 group format, where the club again finished second by one point to Flamurtari Vlorë. The club changed names again to KS Elbasani in 1949 and KF Puna Elbasan in 1950.

=== Labinoti Elbasan ===
Between 1958 and 1991, the club was forcibly named KS Labinoti Elbasan, after a nearby village which had been the center of the first nationwide conference of the Party of Labour of Albania during World War II. In 1984, they won their first and only league title, featuring players like Roland Agalliu, Vladimir Tafani and Muharrem Dosti.

The club's first participation in a European competition came in 1984, where they met Danish side Lyngby Boldklub in the first round of the Champions League qualification stage. The first leg was played at the Ruzhdi Bizhuta Stadium and KF Elbasani were beaten 3–0 at home, and along with another 3–0 loss in Denmark the aggregate result was 6–0 to Lyngby Boldklub.

=== KF Elbasani ===
Following the fall of communism, the club changed its name again to KF Elbasani, which they have not changed ever since. During the 2005–06 season, the team of Elbasani dominated the Albanian Superliga and won the second title in their history, finishing the competition with 11 points more than their rivals in SK Tirana.

In 2006–07, 1st qualifying round for the Champions League they were eliminated by FK Ekranas from Lithuania (1–3 aggregate). On 24 December 2006, coach Luan Deliu was fired and replaced by Edmond Gezdari. The team now is seized by the Directorate of Taxes in Elbasan.

== Stadium ==
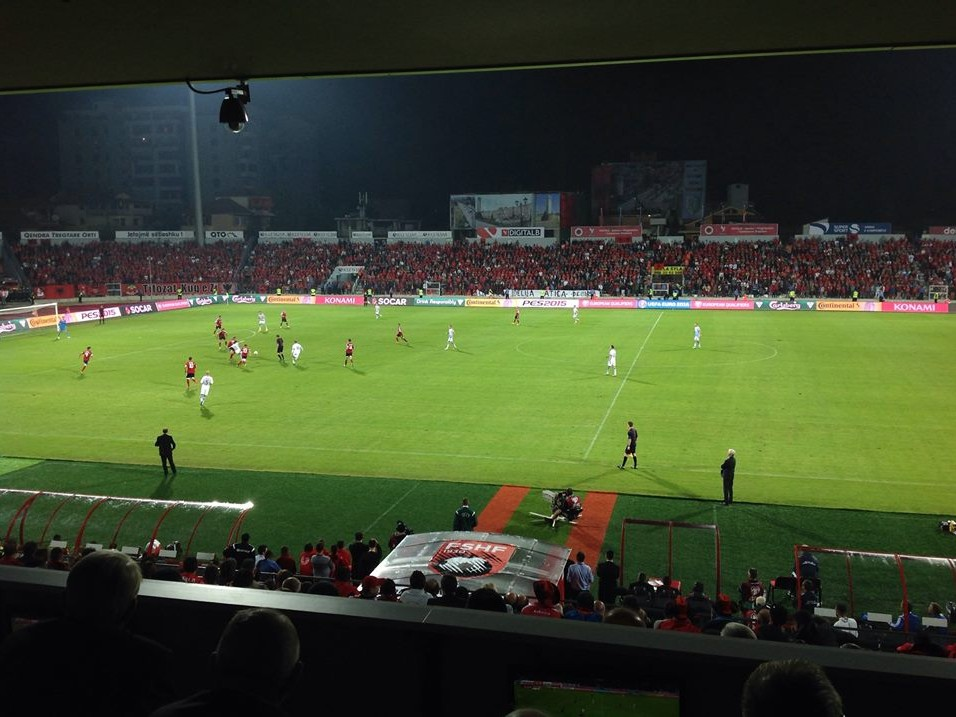
Elbasan Arena Stadium 2014

The club plays its home games at the Elbasan Arena, which was originally built in 1967 and named the Labinot Stadium after the club's name at the time, which was Labinot Elbasan. The stadium was previously called Ruzhdi Bizhuta, after one of the club's most famous players. In January 2014 it was announced that the stadium would take over from the Qemal Stafa Stadium as the home of the Albania national team until Qemal Stafa is reconstructed. Prime minister Edi Rama visited the stadium on 28 January 2014 and he confirmed that work on the stadium would begin shortly, in order for Albania to be able to play their home games in the country as no other stadiums met the minimum requirements for Euro 2016 qualifiers. Works on the stadium began in February, and they were completed in time for Albania's opening qualifying fixture against Denmark in October 2014. The overall reconstruction costs amounted to €5.5 million, which included works being completed on everything from the parking lot to the installation of new floodlights, and the stadium now has an official seated capacity of 12,800.

== Honours ==
- Kategoria Superiore
  - Winners (2): 1983–84, 2005–06
  - Runners-up (1): 2004–05
- Kategoria e Parë (Tier 2)
  - Winners (4): 1933, 1958, 2001–02, 2013–14
  - Runners-up (1): 2009–10
- Albanian Cup
  - Winners (2): 1975, 1992
  - Runners-up(1): 1980
- Albanian Supercup
  - Winners (1): 1992
  - Runners-up (1): 2006

== European competitions record ==
Competition	Played	Won	Drawn	Lost	GF	GA	GD
UEFA competitions	6	1	2	3	2	10	−8

Season	Competition	Round	Country	Club	Home	Away	Aggregate
1984–85	European Cup	1R	(Denmark)	Lyngby BK	0–3	0–3	0–6
2005–06	UEFA Cup	1QR	(North Macedonia)	FK Vardar	1–1	0–0	1–1
2006–07	UEFA Champions League	1QR	(Lithuania)	FK Ekranas	1–0	0–3	1–3

- 1QR = 1st Qualifying Round
- 1R = 1st Round

=== Balkans Cup ===
Competition	Played	Won	Drawn	Lost	GF	GA	GD
Balkans Cup	7	3	1	3	8	10	−2

Season	Competition	Group	Country	Club	Home	Away	Aggregate
1973	Balkans Cup	A	(Socialist Federal Republic of Yugoslavia)	Sutjeska Nikšić	1–0	0–1	1–1
1973	Balkans Cup	A	(Romania)	ASA Târgu Mureș	2–0	1–5	3–5
1988–89	Balkans Cup	A	(Turkey)	Malatyaspor	3–0	– (Note: Malatyaspor withdrew during the first leg which was awarded 3–0 to Elbasan)	3–0
1988–89	Balkans Cup	A	(Greece)	OFI	1–1	0–3	1–4

== Current squad ==
As of 8 December 2019

Note: Flags indicate national team as defined under FIFA eligibility rules; some limited exceptions apply. Players may hold more than one non-FIFA nationality.

No.	Pos.	Nation	Player
1	GK	ALB	Ergys Dosti
2	MF	ALB	Bektash Vasha
3	DF	ALB	Enis Dishani
4	DF	ALB	Arlind Ballgjini
5	DF	ALB	Geri Selimaj
7	DF	ALB	Ilirian Dushaj
8	FW	ALB	Mateo Allkja
9	FW	ALB	Arsen Lleshi
10	MF	ALB	Klodian Nuri
11	MF	ALB	Ergys Peposhi
12	GK	ALB	Ferit Moli
14	FW	ALB	Valentino Baro
15	DF	ALB	Klaudio Çema
16	FW	ALB	Iris Bushi

No.	Pos.	Nation	Player
18	DF	ALB	Serxhjo Bajrami
19	FW	ALB	Kejdi Balla
21	MF	ALB	Mikel Ferhati
23	DF	ALB	Alberto Nikehasani
24	DF	ALB	Kejsi Skënderi
25	MF	ALB	Kristian Mataj
26	DF	ALB	Flavio Xhakerri
29	MF	ALB	Renato Hyshmeri
99	MF	ALB	Endri Duka
—	DF	ALB	Jurgen Lleshi
—	GK	ALB	Fatjon Çollari
—	GK	ALB	Igli Harja
—	MF	BRA	Abner
—	FW	ALB	Kejvin Gica

== Staff ==
Arben Laze

Role	Name
President	(Albania) Arben Laze
Manager	(Albania) Shkëlqim Lleshanaku
Athletic director	(Albania) Blendi Hoxholli
Club doctor	(Albania) Mehmet Berzoxhuni

== Historical list of coaches ==
- (Albania) Sabri Peqini (1957–1960)
- (Albania) Frederik Jorgaqi (1983–1985)
- (Albania) Dashamir Stringa (1990–1995)
- (Albania) Astrit Sejdini (1996–1999)
- (Albania) Luan Deliu (2000)
- (Albania) Petrit Haxhiu (2001–2003)
- (Albania) Artan Bushati (2004–2005)
- (Albania) Ilir Daja (2005–2006)
- (Albania) Luan Deliu (Jul 2006 – 27 Dec 2006)
- (Albania) Edmond Gëzdari (27 Dec 2006 –7 Apr 2007)
- (Albania) Ilirjan File (7 Apr 2007 – Jun 2007)
- (Albania) Krenar Alimehmeti (2007–2008)
- (Albania) Mirel Josa (24 Aug 2008 – 6 Feb 2009)
- (Albania) Faruk Sejdini (6 Feb 2009 – 6 Apr 2009)
- (Albania) Ramadan Shehu (6 Apr 2009 – 22 May 2009)
- (Albania) Bujar Gogunja (22 May 2009 – Jun 2009)
- (Albania) Muharrem Dosti (Jul 2009 – 19 Dec 2009)
- (Albania) Krenar Alimehmeti (19 Dec 2009 – 24 December 2010)
- (Serbia) Esad Karišik (27 December 2010 – 23 February 2011)
- (Albania) Ilirjan File (28 February 2011 – 9 Sep 2014)
- (Albania) Edmond Mustafaraj (Sep 2014)
- (Albania) Muharrem Dosti (Sep 2014 – May 2017)
- (Albania) Eriol Merxha (Jul 2017 – Sep 2018)
- (Albania) Elvis Kotorri (Sep 2018 – Mar 2019)
- (Albania) Marsid Dushku (Mar 2019 – May 2019)
- (Albania) Shkëlqim Lleshanaku (Aug 2019 –)

== Recent seasons ==
Season	Division	Pos.	Pl.	W	D	L	GS	GA	P	Cup	Europe		Notes
1999–00	National Championship	↓13/14	27	8	5	14	20	34	29	Second Round	—	—	Lost 2–1 to Besa Kavajë in relegation playoff.
2000–01	Kategoria e Dytë	1/11	21	17	1	3	57	13	52	Second Round	—	—	Finished third of six teams in promotion playoff.
2001–02	Kategoria e Dytë	↑1/12	22	17	3	2	53	13	51	Semi Finals	—	—	Defeated Besa Kavajë 3–0 in championship final.
2002–03	National Championship	8/14	26	10	6	10	33	35	36	Second Round	—	—	
2003–04	Kategoria Superiore	8/10	36	10	10	16	47	55	40	Quarter Finals	—	—	
2004–05	Kategoria Superiore	2/10	36	24	7	5	59	27	79	Quarter Finals	—	—	Finished runners–up in the Kategoria Superiore.
2005–06	Kategoria Superiore	1/10	36	21	10	5	50	22	73	Semi Finals	UC	1st Qualifier	Won their second Kategoria Superiore title.
2006–07	Kategoria Superiore	7/12	33	10	10	13	34	39	40	Play-off	UCL	1st Qualifier	
2007–08	Kategoria Superiore	4/12	33	13	13	7	40	24	52	Semi Finals	—	—	
2008–09	Kategoria Superiore	↓12/12	33	7	14	12	28	39	35	Quarter Finals	—	—	
2009–10	Kategoria e Parë	↑2/16	24	5	7	12	19	32	22	1st Preliminary	—	—	
2010–11	Kategoria Superiore	↓12/12	30	19	5	6	56	25	62	Second Round	—	—	
2011–12	Kategoria e Parë	6/16	30	11	6	13	44	48	39	Second Round	—	—	
2012–13	Kategoria e Parë	12/16	30	12	4	14	42	46	40	First Round	—	—	
2013–14	Kategoria e Parë	↑1/16	30	18	6	6	46	32	60	First Round	—	—	
2014–15	Kategoria Superiore	↓10/10	36	4	2	30	19	74	14	Second Round	—	—	
2015–16	Kategoria e Parë	6/10	27	8	5	14	27	45	29	First Round	—	—	
2016–17	Kategoria e Parë	↓10/10	26	5	8	13	26	45	15	First Round	—	—	
2017–18	Kategoria e Dytë	↑1/14	26	21	5	0	61	14	68	First Round	—	—	
2018–19	Kategoria e Parë	9/10	8	4	1	3	23	44	19	Preliminary round	—	—	Defeated Luzi 2008 3–0 in relegation playoff.
2019–20	Kategoria e Parë	7/10	28	12	1	15	42	50	37	First round	—	—	
2020–21	Kategoria e Parë	↓8/8	20	3	2	15	13	40	11	Second round	—	—	
2021–22	Kategoria e Dytë									First round	—	—	
