= Eriol Merxha =

Albanian footballer and manager

Personal information
- Full name: Erjol Merxha
- Date of birth: 21 April 1979 (age 47)
- Place of birth: Elbasan, Albania
- Position: Midfielder

Senior career*
| Years | Team | Apps | (Gls) |
| 1996–2000 | Elbasani | 77 | (7) |
| 2000–2004 | Shkumbini | 111 | (10) |
| 2004–2009 | Elbasani | 101 | (6) |
| 2008 | → Kastrioti (loan) | 13 | (0) |
| 2009 | Flamurtari | 14 | (0) |
| 2009-2014 | Elbasani | | |

International career^{‡}
| 2001 | Albania U-21 | 6 | (0) |

Managerial career
- 2017-2018: Elbasani
- * Club domestic league appearances and goals as of 19 May 2010 ‡ National team caps and goals as of 17 May 2009

Eriol Merxha (born 21 April 1979), also spelled as Erjol Merxha, is an Albanian football manager and retired player.

He played as a left midfielder for hometown club Elbasani as well as for Shkumbini and Flamurtari in the Albanian Superliga. He was also a member of the Albanian National U-21 Team during 2001.

== Managerial career ==
Merxha was head coach of Elbasani in 2018–19.

== Honours ==
KF Elbasani

- Albanian First Division (1): 2013–14

Now is a coach of U-10 FK Elbasani and works at Sule Harri School as a physical education teacher.
