= Vorë =

- Municipality
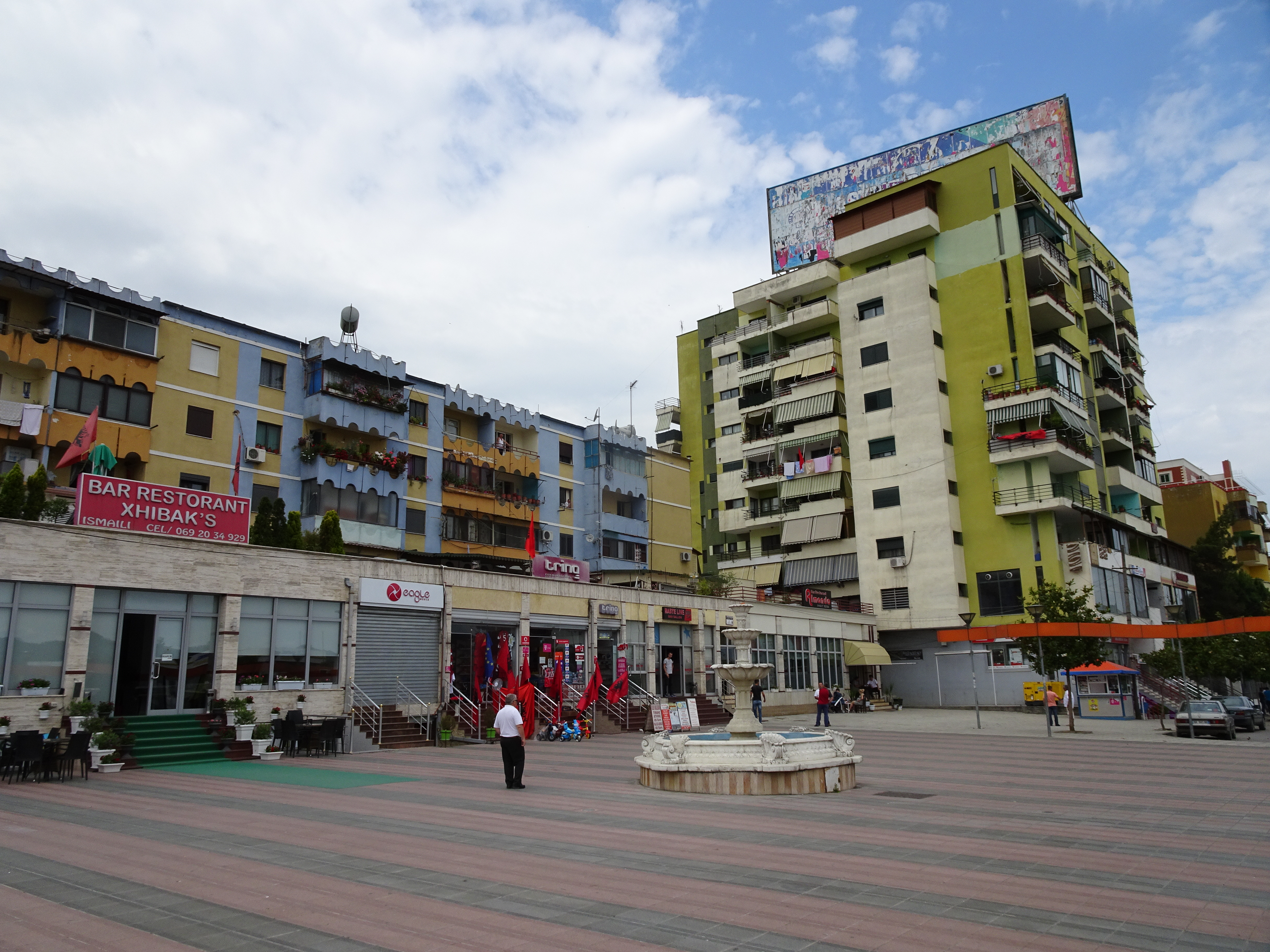
- Vora city center

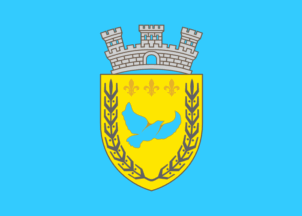
- Flag Emblem

- Location within Albania
- Coordinates: 41°23′38″N 19°39′16″E
- Country: Albania
- County: Tirana

Government
  - Mayor: Blerim Shera (PS)

Area
  - Municipality: 82.76 km^{2} (31.95 sq mi)
  - Administrative unit: 41 km^{2} (16 sq mi)
- Elevation: 60 m (200 ft)

Population (2023)
  - Municipality: 21,621
  - Municipality density: 261.2/km^{2} (676.6/sq mi)
  - Administrative unit: 8,969
  - Administrative unit density: 220/km^{2} (570/sq mi)
- Time zone: UTC+1 (CET)
  - Summer (DST): UTC+2 (CEST)
- Postal Code: 1032
- Area Code: (0)47
- Website: bashkiavore.gov.al

Vorë (Albanian definite form: Vora) is a municipality in Tirana County, central Albania. It was formed at the 2015 local government reform by the merger of the former municipalities Bërxullë, Prezë and Vorë, that became municipal units. The seat of the municipality is the town Vorë. The total population is 21,621 as of the 2023 census, in a total area of 82.76 km^{2} (31.95 sq mi). The population of the municipal unit is 8,969.

Historical population
Year	Pop.	±%
1989	9,565	—
2001	12,558	+31.3%
2011	10,901	−13.2%
2023	8,969	−17.7%

== History ==
Map of Vorë Municipality

There is a medieval castle in the constituent village of Prezë.

=== Gërdec explosions ===
The municipality of Vorë includes the small village of Gërdec. In the Albanian Armed Forces' munition store in this settlement, an accident occurred on 15 March 2008, which caused a series of large explosions, lasting for several hours. As a result of these explosions, 26 people died and several hundred were injured. Several hundred houses and two small villages were completely destroyed and 1,500 buildings were damaged.

=== 2020 earthquake ===
On January 28, 2020, a magnitude 5.1 earthquake struck 12 km (7.5 mi) northwest of Vorë. The official time of the earthquake was 20:48:05 (UTC).

== Economy ==
The area's economy is positively affected by the large number of nearby offices and the proximity of Tirana International Airport Nënë Tereza. There is a lot of agriculture but also factories, such as the Coca-Cola Bottling Shqipëria, and consumer services. The town is located on National Road 2, between Tirana and Durrës, to the west of the capital. It is part of the Tirana-Durrës metropolitan region - industrial and commercial facilities extend along the motorway almost all the way from Tirana to Vorë. Many people who have moved from the countryside to urban areas have settled in places like Vorë or Kamëz. However, these migrants prefer places which lie closer to Tirana and, as a result, other satellite settlements have grown much more rapidly in recent years.

== Transportation ==
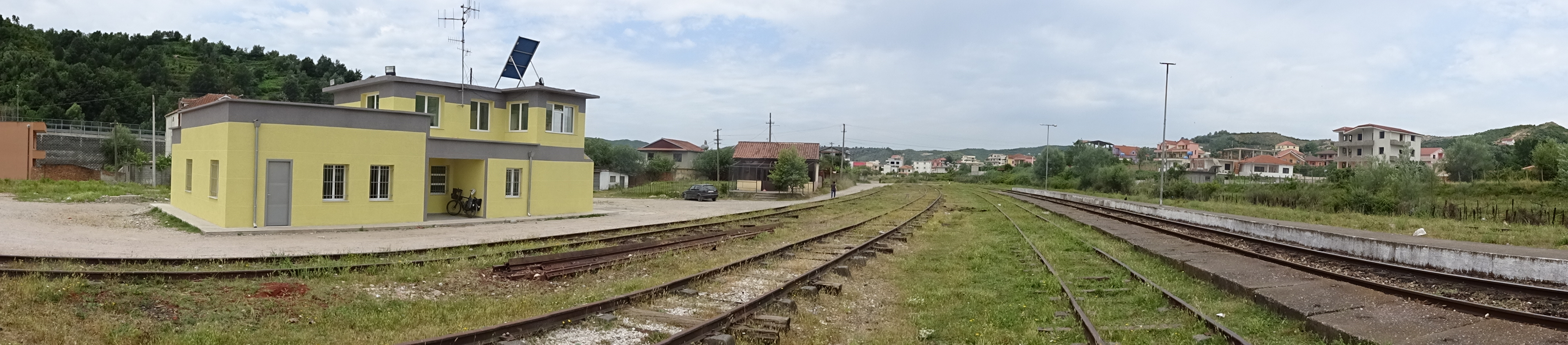
Vorë train station in 2016

Vorë is an important transport hub for Central Albania. It lies in the middle of the long range of hills known as the Kodra e Gjatë which separates the Plain of Tirana from the plains running along the Erzen and surrounding Durrës to the west. Vorë is located in a pass, not more than 60 m (200 ft) high, which cuts through the Kodra e Gjatë range. Railways, motorways, country roads, and overhead power lines are all routed through this pass. Previously there was a canal as well. The roads from Durrës and the railways run by Hekurudha Shqiptare go on from Vorë through Fushë-Krujë to the northern part of the country and onwards to Tirana in the east. Trains from Tirana to Shkodër have to change locomotive at the Vorë station.

== Sport ==
Vorë has a soccer team in the Albanian First Division known as FK Vora. The playing grounds are at Fusha Sportive Vorë with a capacity of 1,000 spectators. The surface is grass.

== Villages ==
Villages within the municipality include Ahmetaq, Bërxullë, Breg-Shkozë, Domje, Fushë-Prezë, Gërdec, Gjeç-Kodër, Gjokaj, Kuç, Marikaj, Marqinet, Muçaj, Ndërmjetës, Palaq, Picar, Prezë, Shargë.
