= Prezë =

- Administrative unit
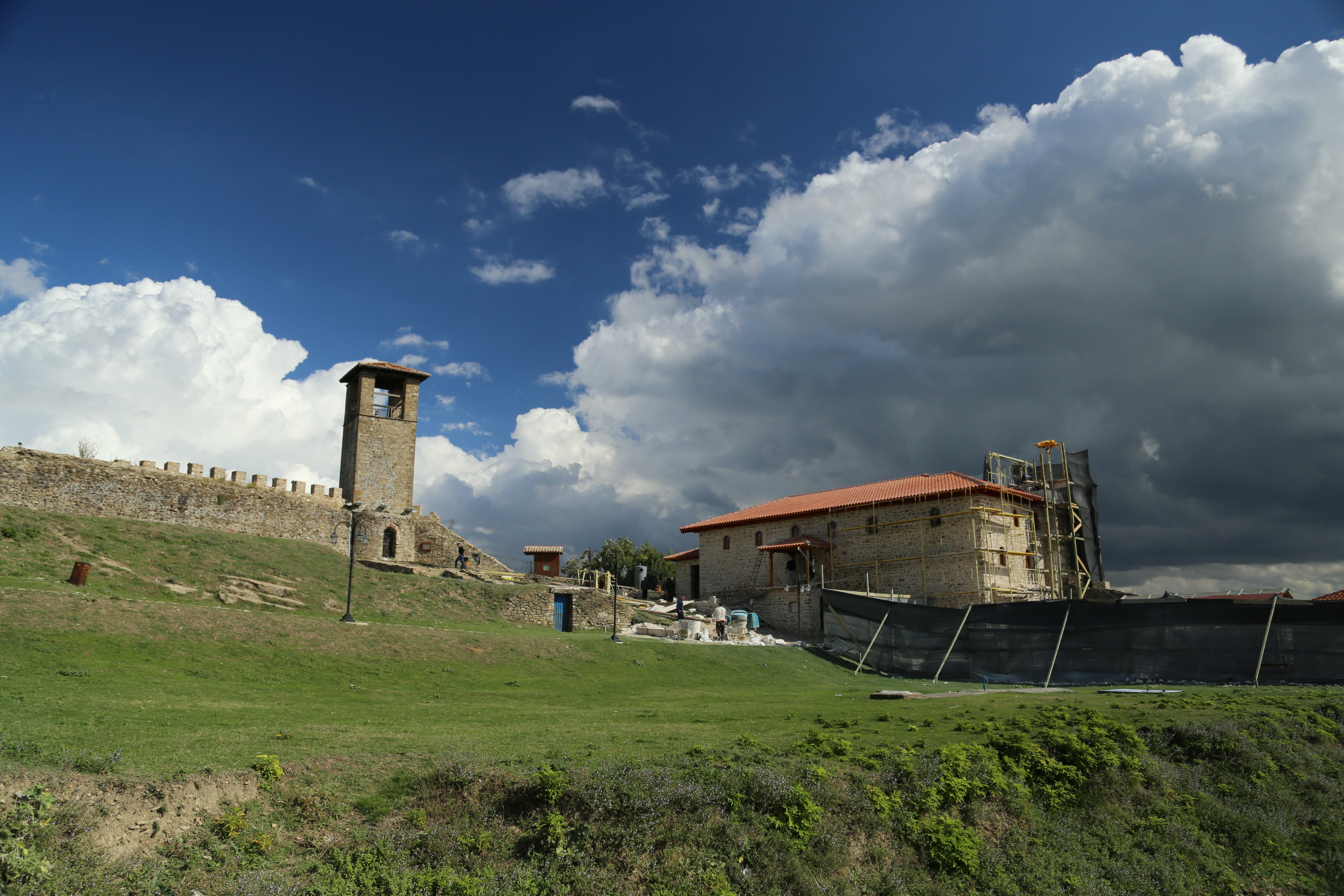
- Prezë castle

- Location within Albania
- Coordinates: 41°26′N 19°40′E
- Country: Albania
- County: Tirana
- Municipality: Vorë
  - Administrative unit: 28.58 km^{2} (11.03 sq mi)

Population (2023)
  - Administrative unit: 3,592
  - Administrative unit density: 125.7/km^{2} (325.5/sq mi)
- Time zone: UTC+1 (CET)
  - Summer (DST): UTC+2 (CEST)

Prezë is a village and a former municipality in Tirana County, central Albania. At the 2015 local government reform, it became a municipal unit of the municipality of Vorë.

== Demographics ==
Prezë experienced a population decline after communism, as inhabitants moved away to nearby cities like Vore and Tirana.

The population as of the 2023 census is 3,592.

Historical population
Year	Pop.	±%
1989	4,533	—
2001	4,521	−0.3%
2011	4,727	+4.6%
2023	3,592	−24.0%
