= 2021–22 KF Teuta Durrës season =

Teuta Durrës
2021–22 season
- Owner: Edmond Hasanbelli
- Head Coach: Edi Martini (until 26 November); Renato Arapi (from 28 November to 14 December); Edi Martini (from 14 December to 24 January); Renato Arapi (from 24 January)
- Stadium: Niko Dovana Stadium (Note: Teuta were not able to play at their home stadium until 30 March 2022 due to rework of the turf.)
- Albanian Superliga: 6th
- Albanian Cup: Semifinals
- Albanian Supercup: Champions
- Champions League: First qualifying round
- Conference League: Third qualifying round
- Top goalscorer: League: Rubin Hebaj (10); All: Rubin Hebaj (13)
Home colours	Away colours

The 2021–22 season is Teuta's 81st season in their history of the Albanian Superliga and came in as the defending champions. Along with the Superliga, the club also participated in the Albanian Supercup, Albanian Cup, and the Champions League qualifying stage. The season began on 11 September 2021 and ended on 26 May 2022.

== First team squad ==
As of 20 February 2022.

Note: Flags indicate national team as defined under FIFA eligibility rules; some limited exceptions apply. Players may hold more than one non-FIFA nationality.

No.	Pos.	Nation	Player
1	GK	ALB	Albi Salobehaj
2	DF	ALB	Reild Kurti
3	MF	ALB	Albin Elezi
4	DF	ALB	Danilo Gecaj
5	DF	ALB	Harallamb Qaqi
6	DF	BRA	Jackson
7	MF	ALB	Jahmir Hyka
8	MF	ALB	Albano Aleksi
9	FW	ALB	Rubin Hebaj
10	MF	ALB	Lorenco Vila
11	MF	KOS	Florent Avdyli
12	GK	ALB	Endri Dema
13	DF	SRB	Filip Ivanović
14	MF	ALB	Asion Daja

No.	Pos.	Nation	Player
15	DF	ALB	Blerim Kotobelli
17	DF	MKD	Blagoja Todorovski
19	FW	ALB	Klejdi Daci (on loan from Kukësi)
20	FW	ALB	Sebino Plaku
22	MF	ALB	Ledio Beqja
24	DF	ALB	Artan Jazxhi
25	DF	ALB	Hektor Idrizaj
27	MF	ALB	Ergys Peposhi (on loan from Kukësi)
45	MF	GHA	Reuben Acquah
60	GK	ALB	Panajot Qirko
88	MF	ALB	Emiljano Vila (captain)
97	FW	ALB	Ildi Gruda
99	FW	ALB	Dejvid Kapllani

== Transfers ==
=== Transfers in ===
Date	Pos.	Nat.	Name	From	Fee	Ref.
20 June 2021	DF	(North Macedonia)	Hristijan Dragarski	(North Macedonia) Pelister Bitola	Free Transfer	
26 June 2021	DF	(Albania)	Blerim Kotobelli	Kukësi	Free Transfer	
26 June 2021	FW	(North Macedonia)	Pepi Gorgiev	(North Macedonia) Sileks Kratovo	Free Transfer	
16 July 2021	DF	(Albania)	Adolf Selmani	Laçi	Free Transfer	
16 July 2021	FW	(Albania)	Santiago Selmani	Laçi	Free Transfer	
8 August 2021	DF	(Albania)	Hektor Idrizaj	Partizani Tirana	Free Transfer	
14 August 2021	FW	(Netherlands)	Arsenio Valpoort	(Cyprus) Ermis Aradippou	Free Transfer	
18 August 2021	GK	(Albania)	Panajot Qirko	Bylis Ballsh	Undisclosed	
23 August 2021	MF	(Ghana)	Reuben Acquah	(Croatia) Lokomotiva Zagreb	Free Transfer	
25 August 2021	DF	(Serbia)	Filip Ivanović	(Azerbaijan) Sabah Masazır	Free Transfer	
26 August 2021	DF	(Albania)	Igli Moqi	Besa Kavajë	Free Transfer	
31 August 2021	MF	(Albania)	Danilo Gecaj	Erzeni Shijak	Free Transfer	
31 August 2021	MF	(Albania)	Laurenc Xheka	Kastrioti Krujë	Free Transfer	
31 August 2021	FW	(Republic of the Congo)	Kévin Koubemba	(Azerbaijan) Sabah Masazır	Free Transfer	
4 January 2022	FW	(Albania)	Rubin Hebaj	(North Macedonia) Shkëndija Tetovë	Free Transfer	
5 January 2022	DF	(Albania)	Reild Kurti	Korabi Peshkopi	Free Transfer	
6 January 2022	MF	(Kosovo)	Florent Avdyli	(Kosovo) Prishtina	Free Transfer	
14 January 2022	DF	(Albania)	Harallamb Qaqi	(Kosovo) Drenica	Free Transfer	
29 January 2022	MF	(Albania)	Jahmir Hyka	(China) Guizhou Hengfeng	Free Transfer	

=== Loans in ===
Date from	Pos.	Nat.	Name	From	Date until	Ref.
28 June 2021	FW	(Albania)	Taulant Seferi	Tirana	13 August 2021	
6 July 2021	MF	(Albania)	Sherif Kallaku	(Croatia) Lokomotiva Zagreb	24 December 2021	
26 January 2022	FW	(Albania)	Ergys Peposhi	Kukësi	30 June 2022	
26 January 2022	FW	(Albania)	Klejdi Daci	Kukësi	30 June 2022	

=== Transfers out ===
Date	Pos.	Nat.	Name	To	Fee	Ref.
12 June 2021	DF	(Greece)	Aleksandër Kuro	(Cyprus) PAEEK	Released	
12 June 2021	DF	(Albania)	Denis Pjeshka	Flamurtari Vlorë	Released	
12 June 2021	MF	(Brazil)	Iran Jr.	(Kosovo) Ulpiana Lipjan	Released	
10 July 2021	FW	(Albania)	Dejvi Bregu	(Turkey) Boluspor	Released	
25 July 2021	MF	(Kosovo)	Florent Avdyli	(Kosovo) Prishtina	Released	
26 July 2021	DF	(Albania)	Rustem Hoxha	(Kosovo) Ballkani Suharekë	Released	
2 August 2021	FW	(Albania)	Blerim Krasniqi	(Kosovo) Gjilani	Released	
3 August 2021	DF	(Albania)	Kristian Jaku	Besëlidhja Lezhë	Released	
8 August 2021	MF	(Albania)	Fabian Beqja	(Kosovo) Gjilani	Released	
14 August 2021	GK	(Albania)	Stivi Frashëri	(Kosovo) Ballkani Suharekë	Released	
19 August 2021	DF	(Albania)	Renato Arapi	Retired		
20 August 2021	DF	(North Macedonia)	Hristijan Dragarski	(North Macedonia) Pelister Bitola	Released	
24 August 2021	MF	(Albania)	Erando Karabeci	(Kosovo) Prishtina	Released	
3 September 2021	FW	(Netherlands)	Arsenio Valpoort	Egnatia	Released	
1 January 2022	DF	(Albania)	Adolf Selmani	Kastrioti Krujë	Released	
1 January 2022	FW	(Albania)	Santiago Selmani	Kastrioti Krujë	Released	
3 January 2022	FW	(North Macedonia)	Pepi Gorgiev	(North Macedonia) Akademija Pandev Strumica	Released	
3 January 2022	GK	(North Macedonia)	Bobi Celeski	(North Macedonia) Skopje	Released	
5 January 2022	DF	(Albania)	Igli Moqi	Lushnja	Released	
5 January 2022	MF	(Albania)	Laurenc Xheka	Korabi Peshkopi	Released	
11 January 2022	FW	(Albania)	Silvio Zogaj	Kastrioti Krujë	Released	
19 January 2022	FW	(Republic of the Congo)	Kévin Koubemba	(Malaysia) Kuala Lumpur City	Released	

=== Loans out ===
Date	Pos.	Nat.	Name	To	Date until	Ref.
1 July 2021	FW	(Albania)	Aldrit Oshafi	Tomori Berat	30 June 2022	

== Pre-season friendlies ==
Win Draw Loss

24 June 2021 Friendly	Sileks Kratovo (North Macedonia)	0–1	(Albania) Teuta Durrës	SRC Biljanini Izvori, North Macedonia
18:00 CEST		Report	E. Vila 20'

27 June 2021 Friendly	Llapi Podujevë (Kosovo)	1–0	(Albania) Teuta Durrës	Gradska Plazha Stadium, North Macedonia
18:00 CEST	Firmino 90' (pen.)	Report

30 June 2021 Friendly	Struga Trim-Lum (North Macedonia)	2–1	(Albania) Teuta Durrës	Gradska Plazha Stadium, North Macedonia
17:30 CEST	B. Shabani 41' Bosančić 47'	Report	Bregu 29' (pen.)

4 September 2021 Friendly	Kastrioti Krujë (Albania)	0–1	(Albania) Teuta Durrës	Kamëz Stadium, Albania
17:00 CEST		Report	Gorgiev 30'

== Competitions ==
=== Albanian Superliga ===
==== League table ====
Pos	Team	Pld	W	D	L	GF	GA	GD	Pts	Qualification or relegation
4	Kukësi	36	15	10	11	50	44	+6	55 (Note: Kukësi is ahead of Vllaznia on head-to-head goal difference: Kukësi 4, Vllaznia 3)	
5	Vllaznia	36	13	16	7	47	38	+9	55	Qualification for the Europa Conference League second qualifying round (Note: Vllaznia qualified for the Europa Conference League second qualifying round as the 2021–22 Albanian Cup winners.)
6	Teuta	36	13	11	12	39	44	−5	50	
7	Kastrioti	36	13	4	19	30	54	−24	43	
8	Egnatia (O)	36	8	11	17	30	49	−19	35	Qualification for the relegation play-off

Source: Albanian Football Association, Soccerway
Rules for classification: 1) Points; 2) Head-to-head points; 3) Head-to-head goal difference; 4) Head-to-head goals scored; 5) Goal difference; 6) Goals scored; 7) Draw.
(O) Play-off winners

==== Matches ====
10 September 2021 1	Teuta Durrës	1–0	Partizani Tirana	Elbasan Arena, Elbasan
19:45 CEST	Gorgiev 18'	Report		Referee: Juxhin Xhaja (Tirana)

18 September 2021 2	Vllaznia Shkodër	1–1	Teuta Durrës	Loro Boriçi Stadium, Shkodër
19:45 CEST	da Silva 57'	Report	Koubemba 73'	Referee: Kreshnik Barjamaj (Tirana)

25 September 2021 3	Teuta Durrës	0–0	Dinamo Tirana	Rrogozhinë Stadium, Rrogozhinë
13:45 CEST		Report		Referee: Eldorjan Hamiti (Lezhë)

3 October 2021 4	Kukësi	2–3	Teuta Durrës	Elbasan Arena, Elbasan
16:45 CEST	Feijão 12'; Gj. Taipi 27' (pen.)	Report	Aleksi 7'; Plaku 32'; Koubemba 45'	Referee: Juxhin Xhaja (Tirana)

17 October 2021 5	Teuta Durrës	2–3	Tirana	Elbasan Arena, Elbasan
19:45 CEST	Ivanović 16'; Najdovski 49' (o.g.)	Report	Xhixha 1'; Totre 50'; Limaj 64'	Referee: Enea Jorgji (Elbasan)

23 October 2021 6	Egnatia	0–1	Teuta Durrës	Rrogozhinë Stadium, Rrogozhinë
13:45 CEST		Report	Kallaku 80' (pen.)	Referee: Erjon Bastari (Tirana)

31 October 2021 7	Teuta Durrës	1–1	Kastrioti Krujë	Loro Boriçi Stadium, Shkodër
16:45 CET	Gruda 51'	Report	Mudražija 80'	Referee: Adrian Beqiraj (Kukës)

7 November 2021 8	Laçi	2–0	Teuta Durrës	Laçi Stadium, Laç
13:45 CET	Mazrekaj 43'; Guindo 90+3'	Report		Referee: Olsid Ferataj (Patos)

21 November 2021 9	Teuta Durrës	2–2	Skënderbeu Korçë	Kamëz Stadium, Kamëz
13:45 CET	L. Vila 36' 48'	Report	Mensah 19'; Bajrami 78'	Referee: Enea Jorgji (Elbasan)

26 November 2021 10	Partizani Tirana	2-1	Teuta Durrës	Elbasan Arena, Elbasan
16:45 CET	Stênio Júnior 90' (pen.); Cara 90+6'	Report	Gorgiev 26'	Referee: Kreshnik Barjamaj (Tirana)

3 December 2021 11	Teuta Durrës	1-1	Vllaznia Shkodër	Elbasan Arena, Elbasan
16:45 CET	Gorgiev 55'	Report	Latifi 70'	Referee: Laver Alla (Lushnjë)

7 December 2021 12	Dinamo Tirana	0-1	Teuta Durrës	Elbasan Arena, Elbasan
16:45 CET		Report	Bakaj 51' (o.g.)	Referee: Olsid Ferataj (Patos)

13 December 2021 13	Teuta Durrës	0-0	Kukësi	Elbasan Arena, Elbasan
16:45 CET		Report		Referee: Enea Jorgji (Elbasan)

19 December 2021 14	Tirana	2-1	Teuta Durrës	Air Albania Stadium, Tirana
19:45 CET	Totre 23'; Seferi 68'	Report	Gruda 84'	Referee: Laver Alla (Lushnjë)

23 December 2021 15	Teuta Durrës	1-2	Egnatia	Elbasan Arena, Elbasan
16:45 CET	Gorgiev 78'	Report	Magani 45+3' 66'	Referee: Kridens Meta (Tirana)

16 January 2022 16	Kastrioti Krujë	2-0	Teuta Durrës	Kamëz Stadium, Kamëz
13:45 CET	Greca 14'; Ajazi 72'	Report		Referee: Kreshnik Cjapi (Fier)

22 January 2022 17	Teuta Durrës	2-4	Laçi	Rrogozhinë Stadium, Rrogozhinë
13:45 CET	Aleksi 22'; Hebaj 80'	Report	Deliu 45+2' 90+6'; Guindo 65' (pen.); Aleksi 73' (o.g.)	Referee: Erjon Bastari (Tirana)

31 January 2022 18	Skënderbeu Korçë	0-1	Teuta Durrës	Elbasan Arena, Elbasan
16:45 CET		Report	L. Vila 74'	Referee: Kridens Meta (Tirana)

5 February 2022 19	Teuta Durrës	0-4	Partizani Tirana	Elbasan Arena, Elbasan
16:45 CET		Report	Skuka 3'; Cara 28'; Sota 60'; Stênio Júnior 90+2'	Referee: Juxhin Xhaja (Tirana)

13 February 2022 20	Vllaznia Shkodër	4-2	Teuta Durrës	Loro Boriçi Stadium, Shkodër
16:45 CET	Latifi 1' 16'; Diagne 7'; Jonuzi 72'	Report	Hebaj 18'; L. Vila 41'	Referee: Enea Jorgji (Elbasan)

20 February 2022 21	Teuta Durrës	1-0	Dinamo Tirana	Elbasan Arena, Elbasan
16:45 CET	E. Vila 11'	Report		Referee: Eldorjan Hamiti (Lezhë)

26 February 2022 22	Kukësi	1-1	Teuta Durrës	Loro Boriçi Stadium, Shkodër
16:45 CET	Baša 90'	Report	Hebaj 78'	Referee: Juxhin Xhaja (Tirana)

2 March 2022 23	Teuta Durrës	0-2	Tirana	Elbasan Arena, Elbasan
16:45 CET		Report	Seferi 17' 60'	Referee: Kreshnik Cjapi (Fier)

7 March 2022 24	Egnatia	0-1	Teuta Durrës	Rrogozhinë Stadium, Rrogozhinë
13:45 CET		Report	Daci 26'	Referee: Indrit Myrtja (Shkodër)

13 March 2022 25	Teuta Durrës	0-1	Kastrioti Krujë	Loro Boriçi Stadium, Shkodër
16:45 CET		Report	Kainã 42'	Referee: Olsion Yzeiraj (Patos)

20 March 2022 26	Laçi	0-1	Teuta Durrës	Laçi Stadium, Laç
13:45 CET		Report	Hebaj 73'	Referee: Eldorjan Hamiti (Lezhë)

3 April 2022 27	Teuta Durrës	0-0	Skënderbeu Korçë	Niko Dovana Stadium, Durrës
16:45 CEST		Report		Referee: Juxhin Xhaja (Tirana)

9 April 2022 28	Partizani Tirana	3-1	Teuta Durrës	Elbasan Arena, Elbasan
16:45 CEST	Skuka 45+2'; Bitri 53'; Mirosavljev 90+6'	Report	Ivanović 27'	Referee: Eldorjan Hamiti (Lezhë)

17 April 2022 29	Teuta Durrës	1-1	Vllaznia Shkodër	Niko Dovana Stadium, Durrës
16:45 CEST	Ivanović 90+9'	Report	Latifi 59' (pen.)	Referee: Erjon Bastari (Tirana)

24 April 2022 30	Dinamo Tirana	0-1	Teuta Durrës	Elbasan Arena, Elbasan
16:45 CEST		Report	Hebaj 56'	Referee: Laver Alla (Lushnjë)

29 April 2022 31	Teuta Durrës	4-1	Kukësi	Niko Dovana Stadium, Durrës
19:45 CEST	Hebaj 12' 52' 84' (pen.); Daci 68'	Report	Musta 37'	Referee: Kridens Meta (Tirana)

4 May 2022 32	Tirana	1-1	Teuta Durrës	Selman Stërmasi Stadium, Tirana
16:45 CEST	Limaj 40'	Report	Plaku 73'	Referee: Laver Alla (Lushnjë)

9 May 2022 33	Teuta Durrës	3-1	Egnatia	Niko Dovana Stadium, Durrës
16:45 CEST	Beqja 10'; Daci 14'; Peposhi 61'	Report	Magani 90+1'	Referee: Kridens Meta (Tirana)

14 May 2022 34	Kastrioti Krujë	0-1	Teuta Durrës	Kamëz Stadium, Kamëz
17:15 CEST		Report	Hebaj 76'	Referee: Kreshnik Barjamaj (Tirana)

21 May 2022 35	Teuta Durrës	2-1	Laçi	Niko Dovana Stadium, Durrës
17:00 CEST	Hebaj 25'; Daja 90+4'	Report	Guindo 15' (pen.)	Referee: Olsion Yzeiraj (Patos)

26 May 2022 36	Skënderbeu Korçë	0-0	Teuta Durrës	Skënderbeu Stadium, Korçë
17:00 CEST		Report		Referee: Klodjan Prenga (Laç)

=== Albanian Cup ===
22 September 2021 1st Round	Luzi 2008	1–4	Teuta Durrës	Luz i Vogël Stadium, Luz i Vogël
16:00 CEST	Myrta 32'	Report	Jazxhi 16'; Zogaj 45+1'; Kapllani 47'; Kallaku 73'	Referee: Ervin Kotemelo (Korçë)

13 October 2021 1st Round	Teuta Durrës	2–2 (6–3 agg.)	Luzi 2008	Niko Dovana Stadium, Durrës
13:30 CEST	Gorgiev 15'; Kapllani 32'	Report	Soumah 26'; Merdini 42'	Referee: Edvin Hoxha (Lezhë)

3 November 2021 2nd Round	Korabi Peshkopi	0–1	Teuta Durrës	Korabi Stadium, Peshkopi
14:00 CET		Report	L. Vila 42'	Referee: Ditmir Grimci (Shkodër)

17 November 2021 2nd Round	Teuta Durrës	2–0 (3–0 agg.)	Korabi Peshkopi	Olympic Park, Durrës
13:30 CET	Ivanović 12'; Plaku 88'	Report		Referee: Xhulio Agolli (Fier)

27 January 2022 Quarterfinals	Skënderbeu Korçë	0-1	Teuta Durrës	Skënderbeu Stadium, Korçë
13:45 CET		Report	Hebaj 61'	Referee: Laver Alla (Lushnjë)

9 February 2022 Quarterfinals	Teuta Durrës	1-0 (2-0 agg.)	Skënderbeu Korçë	Elbasan Arena, Elbasan
16:45 CET	Hebaj 8' (pen.)	Report		Referee: Blerim Ziri (Fushë-Krujë)

30 March 2022 Semifinals	Teuta Durrës	1-2	Laçi	Niko Dovana Stadium, Durrës
17:45 CEST	Todorovski 90+3'	Report	Ujka 6'; Akinyemi 58'	Referee: Olsion Yzeiraj (Patos)

13 April 2022 Semifinals	Laçi	1-1 (3-2 agg.)	Teuta Durrës	Laçi Stadium, Laç
14:45 CEST	Akinyemi 44'	Report	Hebaj 15'	Referee: Kreshnik Cjapi (Fier)

=== Albanian Supercup ===
28 August 2021 Final	Teuta Durrës	3–0	Vllaznia Shkodër	Elbasan Arena, Elbasan
19:00 CEST	Aleksi 57'; Gruda 62'; Plaku 90+4'	Report		Referee: Kridens Meta (Tirana)

=== UEFA Champions League ===
==== First qualifying round ====
7 July 2021 First leg	Teuta Durrës (Albania)	0–4	(Moldova) Sheriff Tiraspol	Niko Dovana Stadium, Albania
19:00 CEST		Report	Luvannor 14' 45'; Traoré 56'; Castañeda 89'	Attendance: 500; Referee: Amine Kourgheli (Belarus)

13 July 2021 Second leg	Sheriff Tiraspol (Moldova)	1–0 (5–0 agg.)	(Albania) Teuta Durrës	Sheriff Stadium, Moldova
19:00 CEST	Traoré 6'	Report		Attendance: 1,920; Referee: Vladimir Moskalyov (Russia)

=== UEFA Europa Conference League ===
==== Second qualifying round ====
22 July 2021 First leg	Teuta Durrës (Albania)	0–2	(Andorra) Inter d'Escaldes	Niko Dovana Stadium, Albania
19:00 CEST		Report	Soldevila 37' 56'	Attendance: 700; Referee: Rauf Jabarov (Azerbaijan)

27 July 2021 Second leg	Inter d'Escaldes (Andorra)	0–3 (a.e.t.) (2–3 agg.)	(Albania) Teuta Durrës	Estadi Nacional, Andorra
17:45 CEST		Report	Plaku 25' 80'; Kallaku 105+1' (pen.)	Attendance: 130; Referee: Viktor Kopiievskyi (Ukraine)

==== Third qualifying round ====
5 August 2021 First leg	Shamrock Rovers (Republic of Ireland)	1–0	(Albania) Teuta Durrës	Tallaght Stadium, Ireland
21:00 CEST	Emakhu 90+1'	Report		Attendance: 1,500; Referee: Kai Erik Steen (Norway)

12 August 2021 Second leg	Teuta Durrës (Albania)	0–2 (0–3 agg.)	(Republic of Ireland) Shamrock Rovers	Elbasan Arena, Albania
20:00 CEST		Report	Gaffney 20' 62'	Attendance: 300; Referee: Petri Viljanen (Finland)

== Statistics ==
=== Appearances and goals ===
No.	Pos	Nat	Player	Total		Kategoria Superiore		Albanian Cup		Champions League		Conference League		Albanian Supercup	
No.	Pos	Nat	Player	Apps	Goals	Apps	Goals	Apps	Goals	Apps	Goals	Apps	Goals	Apps	Goals
Goalkeepers
1	GK	(Albania) ALB	Albi Salobehaj	0	0	0	0	0	0	0	0	0	0	0	0
12	GK	(Albania) ALB	Endri Dema	6	0	4	0	1+1	0	0	0	0	0	0	0
60	GK	(Albania) ALB	Panajot Qirko	37	0	32	0	4	0	0	0	0	0	1	0
Defenders
2	DF	(Albania) ALB	Reild Kurti	1	0	0+1	0	0	0	0	0	0	0	0	0
4	DF	(Albania) ALB	Danilo Gecaj	3	0	0+1	0	1+1	0	0	0	0	0	0	0
5	DF	(Albania) ALB	Harallamb Qaqi	15	0	11+1	0	3	0	0	0	0	0	0	0
6	DF	(Brazil) BRA	Jackson	19	0	11	0	0+1	0	1+1	0	3+1	0	1	0
13	DF	(Serbia) SRB	Filip Ivanović	31	4	24+1	3	5	1	0	0	0	0	1	0
15	DF	(Albania) ALB	Blerim Kotobelli	43	0	25+4	0	8	0	1+1	0	2+2	0	0	0
17	DF	(North Macedonia) MKD	Blagoja Todorovski	31	1	15+4	0	3+2	1	2	0	4	0	1	0
24	DF	(Albania) ALB	Artan Jazxhi	27	1	17+3	0	5+2	1	0	0	0	0	0	0
25	DF	(Albania) ALB	Hektor Idrizaj	34	0	23+5	0	5	0	0	0	0	0	0+1	0
Midfielders
3	MF	(Albania) ALB	Albin Elezi	0	0	0	0	0	0	0	0	0	0	0	0
7	MF	(Albania) ALB	Jahmir Hyka	12	0	5+4	0	1+2	0	0	0	0	0	0	0
8	MF	(Albania) ALB	Albano Aleksi	45	3	32	2	6+1	0	1+1	0	3	0	1	1
11	MF	(Kosovo) KOS	Florent Avdyli	9	0	2+5	0	1	0	0	0	0+1	0	0	0
14	MF	(Albania) ALB	Asion Daja	35	1	18+8	1	1+1	0	1+1	0	4	0	1	0
22	MF	(Albania) ALB	Ledio Beqja	32	1	15+7	1	7+1	0	0+1	0	0+1	0	0	0
27	MF	(Albania) ALB	Ergys Peposhi	14	1	7+6	1	0+1	0	0	0	0	0	0	0
45	MF	(Ghana) GHA	Reuben Acquah	32	0	20+5	0	3+3	0	0	0	0	0	0+1	0
88	MF	(Albania) ALB	Emiljano Vila	46	1	32+2	1	5	0	2	0	4	0	1	0
Forwards
9	FW	(Albania) ALB	Rubin Hebaj	24	13	17+3	10	4	3	0	0	0	0	0	0
10	FW	(Albania) ALB	Lorenco Vila	39	5	25+5	4	7	1	2	0	0	0	0	0
19	FW	(Albania) ALB	Klejdi Daci	17	3	9+6	3	0+2	0	0	0	0	0	0	0
20	FW	(Albania) ALB	Sebino Plaku	32	6	9+16	2	0+2	1	0	0	2+2	2	1	1
97	FW	(Albania) ALB	Ildi Gruda	39	3	3+25	2	3+3	0	1	0	0+3	0	0+1	1
99	FW	(Albania) ALB	Dejvid Kapllani	14	2	0+10	0	3+1	2	0	0	0	0	0	0
Players transferred out during the season
1	GK	(North Macedonia) MKD	Bobi Celeski	3	0	0	0	3	0	0	0	0	0	0	0
3	DF	(Albania) ALB	Renato Arapi	6	0	0	0	0	0	2	0	4	0	0	0
5	DF	(Albania) ALB	Adolf Selmani	12	0	10	0	0+1	0	0	0	0	0	1	0
5	DF	(Albania) ALB	Rustem Hoxha	3	0	0	0	0	0	2	0	1	0	0	0
7	MF	(Albania) ALB	Fabian Beqja	1	0	0	0	0	0	0	0	0+1	0	0	0
9	FW	(North Macedonia) MKD	Pepi Gorgiev	25	5	10+5	4	2+1	1	0+2	0	1+3	0	1	0
10	MF	(Albania) ALB	Sherif Kallaku	25	3	15	1	2+1	1	1+1	0	4	1	1	0
11	FW	(Albania) ALB	Silvio Zogaj	10	1	0+5	0	2+1	1	0	0	0+2	0	0	0
13	MF	(Albania) ALB	Erando Karabeci	5	0	0	0	0	0	1	0	2+2	0	0	0
16	FW	(Albania) ALB	Santiago Selmani	1	0	0	0	0+1	0	0	0	0	0	0	0
16	FW	(Albania) ALB	Taulant Seferi	6	0	0	0	0	0	2	0	4	0	0	0
19	FW	(Albania) ALB	Blerim Krasniqi	1	0	0	0	0	0	0	0	1	0	0	0
19	FW	(Republic of the Congo) CGO	Kévin Koubemba	15	2	6+7	2	1+1	0	0	0	0	0	0	0
21	MF	(Albania) ALB	Laurenc Xheka	2	0	0	0	1+1	0	0	0	0	0	0	0
23	DF	(Albania) ALB	Igli Moqi	2	0	0	0	1+1	0	0	0	0	0	0	0
28	DF	(North Macedonia) MKD	Hristijan Dragarski	1	0	0	0	0	0	0	0	1	0	0	0
77	GK	(Albania) ALB	Stivi Frashëri	6	0	0	0	0	0	2	0	4	0	0	0
95	FW	(Albania) ALB	Dejvi Bregu	1	0	0	0	0	0	1	0	0	0	0	0

Source: Competitions

=== Goalscorers ===
Rank	No.	Pos.	Name	Kategoria Superiore	Albanian Cup	Conference League	Albanian Supercup	Total
1	9	FW	(Albania) Rubin Hebaj	10	3			13
2	20	FW	(Albania) Sebino Plaku	2	1	2	1	6
3	9	FW	(North Macedonia) Pepi Gorgiev	4	1			5
3	10	FW	(Albania) Lorenco Vila	4	1			5
4	13	DF	(Serbia) Filip Ivanović	3	1			4
5	8	MF	(Albania) Albano Aleksi	2			1	3
5	10	MF	(Albania) Sherif Kallaku	1	1	1		3
5	19	FW	(Albania) Klejdi Daci	3				3
5	97	FW	(Albania) Ildi Gruda	2			1	3
6	19	FW	(Republic of the Congo) Kévin Koubemba	2				2
6	99	FW	(Albania) Dejvid Kapllani		2			2
7	11	FW	(Albania) Silvio Zogaj		1			1
7	14	MF	(Albania) Asion Daja	1				1
7	17	DF	(North Macedonia) Blagoja Todorovski		1			1
7	22	MF	(Albania) Ledio Beqja	1				1
7	24	DF	(Albania) Artan Jazxhi		1			1
7	27	MF	(Albania) Ergys Peposhi	1				1
7	88	MF	(Albania) Emiljano Vila	1				1
Own goals				2				2
Totals				39	13	3	3	58

Players in italics left the team during the season
