= List of people from Durrës =

The following are notable people who were either born, raised or have lived for a significant period of time in Durrës:

== Historical figure ==
- Anastasius I, Emperor of the Byzantine Empire
- Aretes of Dyrrachium, natural philosopher
- Jahja Ballhysa, signatory of the Albanian Declaration of Independence
- Pietro Bianco, pirate from Durrës who lived in the 1450s
- Bruti family, Medieval family who ruled in Durres
- Abaz Efendi Çelkupa, signatory of the Albanian Declaration of Independence
- Mustafa Hanxhiu, signatory of the Albanian Declaration of Independence
- Nikollë Mekajshi, early 17th century Albanian patriot
- Karl Topia, Prince of Albania

== Politics and public office ==
- Pjetër Arbnori, "the Mandela of the Balkans"
- Vangjush Dako, Mayor of Durrës
- Namik Dokle, politician and former Chairman of the Parliament of Albania September 2001 – April 2002
- Grida Duma, female politician
- Lefter Koka, former mayor of Durrës, politician, and former minister
- Fatmir Mediu, politician, leader of Republican Party of Albania
- Bujar Nishani, politician and former President of Albania
- Gazmend Oketa, politician, former minister
- Sokol Olldashi, politician, former minister
- Nako Spiru, high-ranking official of the Communist Party of Albania and Minister of Economy and Industry 1946–1947
- Ferdinand Xhaferraj, former Minister of Tourism, Cultural Affairs, Youth and Sports

== Athletics, sports and recreation ==
=== Football ===
A–H

- Arbër Aliu
- Dritan Babamusta
- Haxhi Ballgjini
- Shyqyri Ballgjini
- Gentian Begeja
- Fabian Beqja
- Safet Berisha
- Niko Bespalla
- Mario Dajsinani
- Alfred Deliallisi
- Ardit Deliu
- Enkeleid Dobi
- Niko Dovana
- Bajram Fraholli
- Jurgen Goxha
- Nazmi Gripshi
- Fatmir Hima
- Bledar Hodo
- Altin Hoxha
- Fabio Hoxha
- Rustem Hoxha
- Sulejman Hoxha

I–R

- Skënder Jareci
- Artan Jazxhi
- Elvis Kabashi
- Dejvid Kapllani
- Edmond Kapllani
- Xhevahir Kapllani
- Artan Karapici
- Elton Koça
- Bledar Mançaku
- Gentian Manuka
- Kristi Marku
- Rexhep Memini
- Mikaela Metalla
- Agim Murati
- Stavri Nica
- Alfred Osmani
- Panajot Pano
- Armand Pasha
- Ermir Rezi
- Bledjan Rizvani

S–Z

- Arlis Shala
- Klaidi Shala
- Orges Shehi
- Shaqir Stafa
- Guido Tepshi
- Edlir Tetova
- Rejnaldo Troplini
- Artan Vila
- Emiljano Vila
- Lorenco Vila
- Andi Xhixha

=== Other ===
- Erald Dervishi, chess player
- Mirela Manjani, athlete
- Kreshnik Qato, boxer
- Shkëlqim Troplini, wrestler

== Art, photography, architecture ==
- Andrea Alessi, architect
- Ibrahim Kodra, painter
- John Koukouzelis or Jan Kukuzeli, Byzantine music composer
- Kristaq Rama, sculptor, art educator and the father of the Albanian PM, Edi Rama
- Helidon Xhixha, sculptor

== Literature, journalism, filmography ==
- Elvira Dones, novelist, screenwriter, and documentary film producer

== Scholars, science, academicians ==
- Leonik Tomeu, professor of Nicholas Copernicus at the University of Padova

== Religion and clergy ==
- Saint Astius of Durrës, martyr and Bishop of Dyrrhachium
- Pal Engjëlli, cardinal, clergyman, scholar, and Archbishop of Durrës
- Dom Nikollë Kaçorri, signatory of the Albanian Declaration of Independence
- Jan Kukuzeli, Medieval Albanian Christian composer
- Nikollë Mekajshi, Franciscan Roman Catholic, bishop of Stephanium

== Others ==
- Ilir Hoti, economist and banker
- Ina Rama, Magistrate, former Chief Prosecutor
- Hygerta Sako, former Miss Albania
