= Blerim Kotobelli =

Albanian footballer

Personal information
- Date of birth: 10 August 1992 (age 34)
- Place of birth: Skrapar, Albania
- Height: 1.78 m (5 ft 10 in)
- Position: Left-back

Team information
- Current team: Teuta
- Number: 15

Youth career
- 2005–2012: Larisa

Senior career*
Years	Team	Apps	(Gls)
2012–2013	Olimpic CF	18	(2)
2013–2014	Tirana	9	(0)
2014–2017	Teuta	100	(3)
2017–2018	Partizani	25	(0)
2018–2019	Flamurtari	30	(0)
2019–2021	Kukësi	46	(0)
2021–	Teuta	152	(4)

International career
2013–2015	Albania U21	2	(0)
- * Club domestic league appearances and goals as of 13 May 2026

Blerim Kotobelli (born 10 August 1992) is an Albanian professional footballer who plays as a left-back for Teuta.

== Club career ==
=== Teuta Durrës ===
In June 2014, Kotobelli completed a transfer to Teuta Durrës by penning a one-year contract. He debuted with the team on 23 August 2014 in the opening league match of 2014–15 season against Flamurtari Vlorë. Following this, Kotobelli become a regular starter in the lineup, playing 35 matches throughout the campaign, including 32 in league, as Teuta barely avoided relegation. He also scored two goals in the defeats against Apolonia Fier and Skënderbeu Korçë.

Kotobelli was distinguished for his performances in the first part of 2015–16 season, as Teuta become a contender for a European spot next season. He was able to make 34 league appearances, all of them as starter, as Teuta gained the right to play in Europa League first qualifying round by finishing fourth, tied with Kukësi.

He kicked off 2016–17 season on 30 June by making his European debut in the match against Kairat, playing full-90 minutes in a 0–1 home defeat. He also played in the returning leg of week later, as Teuta were smashed 5–0, its second biggest defeat of all time, eliminated from the competition with the aggregate 6–0. On 27 May of the following year, in the final matchday, Kotobelli made his 100th league appearance for Teuta by starting in a 2–1 away defeat at Laçi.

Only four days later, it was confirmed that Kotobelli left the club after three seasons, where he collected 114 appearances in all competitions, scoring three times, being one of the most valued players of the team.

=== Partizani Tirana ===
On 9 June 2017, Kotobelli joined fellow Albanian Superliga side Partizani Tirana by signing a one-year contract with an option of a further one. He was presented by Luciano Moggi and was handed squad number 15. He played his first match for his new club on 10 September by starting in a 2–0 home loss to Laçi. The 2017–18 season was below expectation for Kotobelli, as he struggled to keep his spot in the starting lineup, making 31 appearances in all competitions, including 25 in league, collecting 1658 minutes. On 16 June 2018, Partizani Tirana announced via its official website the departure of Kotobelli after one year.

=== Return to Teuta ===
On 26 June 2021, Kotobelli joined Teuta by signing to a two-year contract, returning to Durrës after four years. Two months later, he won his first career trophy, the Albanian Supercup, as Teuta won 3–0 against Vllaznia at Elbasan Arena.

On 30 June 2025, Kotobelli signed a new two-year contract with the club. In the 3rd matchday of 2025–26 Kategoria Superiore, he scored his first league goal in three years as Teuta defeated Dinamo City at home.

== International career ==
In November 2013, Kotobelli received his first call-up to the under-21 squad for the 2015 UEFA European Under-21 Championship qualifying matches against Hungary and Spain. He made his debut on 14 November by playing full-90 minutes in Albania's 2–0 away win at Hungary. He also played full-90 minutes in the next match against Spain, as Albania slumped into a 0–2 home defeat.

== Career statistics ==
As of 26 June 2021

Appearances and goals by club, season and competition
Club	Season	League			Cup		Continental		Total	
Club	Season	Division	Apps	Goals	Apps	Goals	Apps	Goals	Apps	Goals
Olimpic CF	2012–13	Albanian Second Division	18	2	2	1	—		20	3
Tirana	2013–14	Albanian Superliga	9	0	3	0	—		12	0
Teuta Durrës	2014–15	Albanian Superliga	32	2	3	0	—		35	2
Teuta Durrës	2015–16	Albanian Superliga	34	0	2	0	—		36	0
Teuta Durrës	2016–17	Albanian Superliga	34	1	7	0	2 (Note: All appearance(s) in UEFA Europa League)	0	43	1
Teuta Durrës	Total		100	3	12	0	2	0	114	3
Partizani Tirana	2017–18	Albanian Superliga	25	0	4	0	2	0	31	0
Flamurtari Vlorë	2018–19	Albanian Superliga	30	0	4	0	—		34	0
Kukësi	2019–20	Albanian Superliga	16	0	8	0	—		24	0
Kukësi	2020–21	Albanian Superliga	30	0	3	1	0 (Note: Unused sub in UEFA Europa League)	0	33	1
Kukësi	Total		46	0	11	1	0	0	57	1
Teuta Durrës	2021–22	Albanian Superliga	29	0	8	0	6	0	43	0
Career total			257	5	44	2	10	0	311	7

== Honours ==
Teuta

- Albanian Supercup: 2021
