= Jackson (footballer, born 1991) =

Brazilian footballer

Personal information
- Full name: Jackson Ferreira Silvério
- Date of birth: 12 April 1991 (age 35)
- Place of birth: Natal, Brazil
- Height: 1.72 m (5 ft 7 1/2 in)
- Position: Left-back

Team information
- Current team: Prishtina e Re

Youth career
- –2006: São Caetano
- 2007: São Bernardo
- 2007–2008: ECUS
- 2009–2012: Sport Recife
- 2011–2012: → Grêmio (loan)

Senior career*
Years	Team	Apps	(Gls)
2010–2012	Sport Recife	1	(0)
2013–2015	Porto-PE	8	(0)
2014	→ Santa Rita (loan)	4	(0)
2015	→ Boa (loan)	0	(0)
2015–2016	Kallithea	18	(2)
2016–2017	Trikala	5	(1)
2017–2019	Luftëtari	47	(1)
2019–2021	Gjilani	43	(0)
2021–2022	Teuta	27	(0)
2023–2024	Iliria		
2024–	Prishtina e Re		
- * Club domestic league appearances and goals as of 3 April 2022

Jackson Ferreira Silvério (born 12 April 1991), commonly known as Jackson, is a Brazilian footballer who plays as a left-back for Kosovan second-tier First Football League of Kosovo club Prishtina e Re.

== Career statistics ==
=== Club ===
As of 28 May 2021.

Club	Season	League			Cup		Continental		Other		Total	
Club	Season	Division	Apps	Goals	Apps	Goals	Apps	Goals	Apps	Goals	Apps	Goals
Sport Recife	2010	Série B	1	0	–		–		–		1	0
Sport Recife	2011	–			–		–		1 (Note: Appearances in the Campeonato Pernambucano)	0	1	0
Sport Recife	2012	–			–		–		3	0	3	0
Sport Recife	Total		1	0	0	0	0	0	4	0	5	0
Porto-PE	2013	–			–		–		17	0	17	0
Porto-PE	2014	Série D	8	0	–		–		12	0	20	0
Porto-PE	2015	–			–		–		18	3	18	3
Porto-PE	Total		8	0	0	0	0	0	47	3	55	3
Santa Rita (loan)	2014	–			–		–		4 (Note: Appearances in the Campeonato Alagoano)	0	4	0
Boa (loan)	2015	Série B	–		–		–		2 (Note: Appearances in the Campeonato Mineiro)	0	2	0
Kallithea	2015–16	Football League	18	2	2 (Note: Appearances in the Greek Cup)	0	–		–		20	2
Trikala	2016–17	Football League	5	1	1	0	–		–		6	1
Luftëtari Gjirokastër	2017–18	Albanian Superliga	18	1	1 (Note: Appearances in the Albanian Cup)	0	–		–		19	1
Luftëtari Gjirokastër	2018–19	Albanian Superliga	29	0	7	0	1 (Note: Appearances in the UEFA Europa League)	0	–		37	0
Luftëtari Gjirokastër	Total		47	1	8	0	1	0	0	0	55	1
Gjilani	2019–20	Kosovar Superliga	26	0	2 (Note: Appearances in the Kosovar Cup)	0	–		–		28	0
Gjilani	2020–21	Kosovar Superliga	17	0	–		1	0	–		18	0
Gjilani	Total		43	0	2	0	1	0	0	0	46	0
Teuta Durrës	2020–21	Albanian Superliga	15	0	2	0	–		–		17	0
Teuta Durrës	2021–22	Albanian Superliga	11	0	1	0	6	0	1	–	19	0
Teuta Durrës	Total		54	0	3	0	7	0	1	0	65	0
Career total			148	4	16	0	8	0	58	3	230	7

== Honours ==
=== Club ===
Teuta Durrës

- Albanian Superliga: 2020–21
- Albanian Supercup: 2021
