= Pano Qirko =

Albanian footballer

Personal information
- Full name: Panajot Qirko
- Date of birth: 26 June 1999 (age 27)
- Place of birth: Vlorë, Albania
- Height: 1.90 m (6 ft 3 in)
- Position: Goalkeeper

Team information
- Current team: Partizani Tirana
- Number: 60

Youth career
- 2012–2013: Vlora
- 2013–2017: Flamurtari Vlorë

Senior career*
Years	Team	Apps	(Gls)
2016–2019	Flamurtari Vlorë	5	(0)
2019–2020	Tirana	0	(0)
2019	→ Tirana B	8	(0)
2020–2021	Bylis Ballsh	35	(0)
2021–2023	Teuta Durrës	66	(0)
2023–	Partizani Tirana	92	(0)

International career^{‡}
2015	Albania U16	2	(0)
2017	Albania U19	3	(0)
- * Club domestic league appearances and goals as of 13 May 2026 ‡ National team caps and goals as of 10 October 2017

Panajot Qirko (born 26 June 1999), commonly known as Pano Qirko, is an Albanian professional footballer who plays as a goalkeeper for Albanian club Partizani Tirana.

== Club career ==
=== Early career ===
Qirko started his youth career at KF Vlora in 2012. A year later he moved to fellow Vlora club Flamurtari Vlorë. He won the 2014–15 Superliga under-17 with Flamurtari U-17. In the 2015–16 season he played 3 youth cup games with under-17 side. Then he moved to the under-19 and so far for the 2016–17 season he has played 10 youth league games.

=== Flamurtari ===
For the 2016–17 he gained entry with the first team of Flamurtari Vlorë and was placed as a third choice behind Argjent Halili and Stivi Frashëri leaving behind Edmir Sali. He made it his professional debut on 16 November 2016 in the 2016–17 Albanian Cup match against Tërbuni Pukë coming on as a substitute in the 73rd minute in place of Frashëri in a 2–0 win.

== International career ==
=== Youth ===
He participated with Albania national under-16 football team in the 2015 UEFA Development Tournament and played 2 matches under coach Alban Bushi, against Montenegro U16 on 2 May 2015 in a 3–1 win and kept a clean sheet a day later against Armenia U16. Following a 1–0 victory against Cyprus U16 2 days later, Albania U16 won the tournament.

Qirko was called up to Albania national under-17 football team by coach Džemal Mustedanagić for a friendly tournament in Italy against Fasano, Frosinone & Italy B on match-dates 19–21 May 2015.

He was then called up at Albania national under-19 football team in the pre-eliminary squad by coach Arjan Bellaj to participate in the 2017 UEFA European Under-19 Championship qualification from 6–11 October 2016.

Qirko was re-called to under-19 team by new coach Erjon Bogdani for a gathering in Durrës, Albania in April 2017 where they also played two friendly matches. He was called up also for the next gathering for a double Friendly match against Georgia U19 on 30 August & 1 September 2017.

== Career statistics ==
=== Club ===
As of 13 September 2017

Club statistics
Club	Season	League			Cup		Europe (Note: Including continental competitions, such as UEFA Champions League and UEFA Europa League)		Other (Note: Including other competitions, such as Albanian Supercup)		Total	
Club	Season	Division	Apps	Goals	Apps	Goals	Apps	Goals	Apps	Goals	Apps	Goals
Flamurtari Vlorë	2016–17	Albanian Superliga	0	0	1	0	—		—		1	0
Flamurtari Vlorë	2017–18	Albanian Superliga	3	0	1	0	—		—		4	0
Flamurtari Vlorë	2018–19	Albanian Superliga	2	0	1	0	—		—		3	0
Flamurtari Vlorë	Total		5	0	3	0	—		—		8	0
Tirana	2019–20	Albanian Superliga	0	0	1	0	—		—		1	0
Bylis Ballsh	2020–21	Albanian Superliga	35	0	1	0	—		—		36	0
Teuta Durrës	2021–22	Albanian Superliga	32	0	4	0	—		1	0	37	0
Career total			72	0	9	0	—		1	0	45	0

== Club ==
Tirana

- Albanian Superliga: 2019–20

Teuta

- Albanian Supercup: 2021

Partizani Tirana

- Albanian Supercup: 2023

=== International ===
Albania U16

- UEFA Development Tournament: 2015
