= Avdyli =

Avdyli is a surname. Notable people with the surname include:

- Florent Avdyli (born 1993), Kosovar football central midfielder
- Ilir Avdyli (born 1990), Kosovar football goalkeeper
- Milot Avdyli (born 2002), Kosovar football midfielder
