= Blagoja Todorovski =

Macedonian footballer

Personal information
- Full name: Blagoja Todorovski
- Date of birth: 11 June 1985 (age 41)
- Place of birth: Skopje, SFR Yugoslavia
- Height: 1.75 m (5 ft 9 in)
- Position: Midfielder

Team information
- Current team: Skopje
- Number: 77

Senior career*
Years	Team	Apps	(Gls)
2002–2003	Kumanovo	12	(2)
2004–2007	Sileks	80	(16)
2008–2010	Dinamo București	2	(0)
2008–2010	→ Renova (loan)	55	(12)
2010	→ Dinamo II București (loan)	4	(2)
2011–2014	Rabotnički	120	(15)
2015–2019	Shkëndija Tetovë	104	(5)
2018	→ Rabotnički (loan)	12	(0)
2019–2022	Teuta Durrës	85	(1)
2022–	Skopje	8	(0)

International career^{‡}
2014–2015	Macedonia	4	(0)
- * Club domestic league appearances and goals as of 16:36, 27 June 2021 (UTC) ‡ National team caps and goals as of 17 July 2018

Blagoja Todorovski (Macedonian: Благоја Тодоровски, born 11 June 1985), nicknamed Blaže, is a Macedonian footballer who plays as a midfielder for Macedonian side FK Skopje.

== International career ==
Todorovski played four games for Macedonia, he made his debut on 18 June 2014 in friendly match against China which ended with a 2–0 loss. Four days later he played again against China, this time the score was 0–0. He also played in a Euro 2016 qualification match against Belarus which ended with a 2–1 loss. His final international was a March 2015 friendly against Australia, which ended 0–0.

== Honours ==
Renova

- Macedonian First League: 2009–10

Rabotnički

- Macedonian First League: 2013–14
- Macedonian Football Cup: 2013–14, 2014–15

Shkendija

- Macedonian First League: 2017–18, 2018–19
- Macedonian Football Cup: 2015–16, 2017–18

Teuta Durrës

- Albanian Cup: 2019–20
- Albanian Supercup: 2020
- Albanian Superliga: 2020–21
- Albanian Supercup: 2021
