= Ergys =

- Gender: Male

Origin
- Region of origin: Albania, Kosovo

Ergys is an Albanian masculine given name. Notable people with the given name include:

- Ergys Kaçe (born 1993), Albanian footballer
- Ergys Peposhi (born 2000), Albanian footballer
- Ergys Sorra (born 1989), Albanian footballer
