= Rubin Hebaj =

Albanian footballer

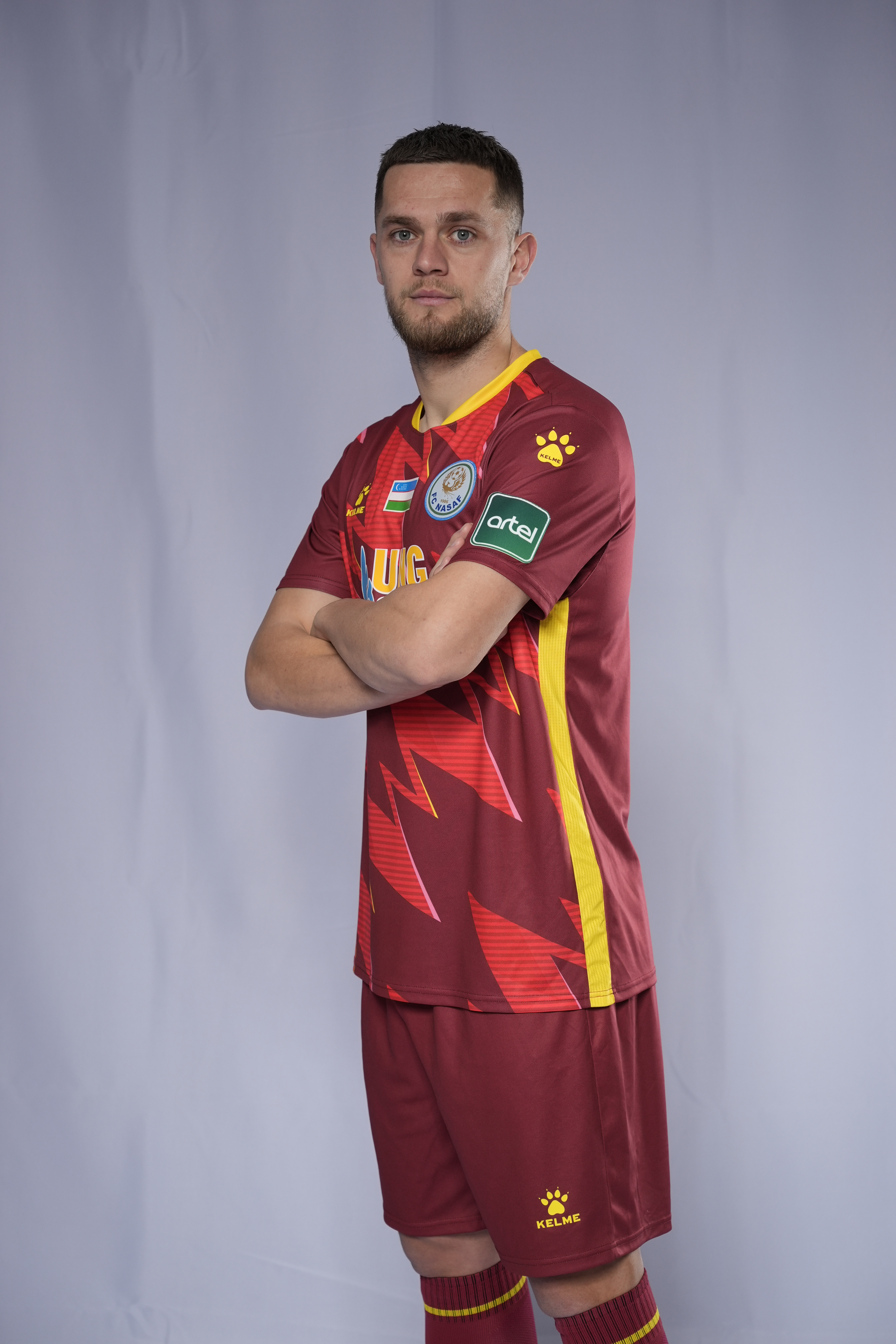

Personal information
- Full name: Rubin Hebaj
- Date of birth: 30 July 1998 (age 28)
- Place of birth: Shkodër, Albania
- Height: 1.87 m (6 ft 2 in)
- Position: Forward

Team information
- Current team: AF Elbasani
- Number: 99

Youth career
- 2012–2017: Vllaznia

Senior career*
Years	Team	Apps	(Gls)
2015–2017	Vllaznia	23	(4)
2016	→ Vllaznia B	3	(2)
2017–2019	Domžale	14	(4)
2018–2019	→ Partizani (loan)	21	(4)
2019	Vorskla Poltava	5	(0)
2020–2021	Teuta	26	(3)
2021	Shkëndija	26	(4)
2022	Teuta	35	(11)
2023	Andijon	24	(12)
2024	Al-Orobah	12	(3)
2024	CS Sfaxien	6	(2)
2025	Nasaf	7	(2)
2025	Sogdiana	13	(7)
2026	Tobol	7	(0)
2026–	AF Elbasani	2	(2)

International career^{‡}
2014	Albania U17 (Note: Official competitive UEFA matches only.)	3	(0)
2015	Albania U19	3	(0)
2017	Albania U21	4	(0)
- * Club domestic league appearances and goals as of 5 December 2025 ‡ National team caps and goals as of 9 October 2017

Rubin Hebaj (born 30 July 1998) is an Albanian professional footballer who plays as a forward for Abissnet Superiore club AF Elbasani.

== Club career ==
=== Early career ===
Hebaj started his youth career aged 14 with Vllaznia in September 2012 and was placed in under-15 team. With under-15 side Hebaj won the National Regional Championship and was voted as the best player of the tournament. After spending one season with under-15 he advanced in other youth teams of Vllaznia. During the 2016–17 season he played for Vllaznia B in the Kategoria e Dytë, scoring two goals in three matches.

=== Vllaznia ===
He made his debut with the Vllaznia first team under the coach Armir Grimaj in the 2015–16 Albanian Cup match against Apolonia on 28 October 2015 in a goalless draw, coming on as a substitute in the 70th minute in place of Santiago Martinez.

=== Domžale ===
On 22 June 2017, Hebaj moved for the first time aboard by joining Slovenian team Domžale on a three-year contract. He made his debut on 30 July 2017 against Ankaran in the third game week, coming on as a substitute in the 58th minute in place of Matija Rom. He scored his first goal on 27 August 2017 against Krško in his third match played. In the contest, Hebaj provided the assist for Alen Ožbolt's equalising goal and, minutes later, scored himself for the 2–1 lead. However, Krško managed to win the game with a score of 4–2.

==== Loan to Partizani ====
On 27 July 2018, Partizani reached an agreement with Domžale for the services of Hebaj on a one-year loan; his salary will be paid by his parent club. He was presented the following day, receiving the squad number 9. He endured a difficult first part of the season, spending the time between bench and the pitch. However, he proved to be decisive in the capital derby against Tirana, as he came from the bench to score a brace, his first league goals, to help the team overturn the result and win 2–1 to maintain the championship lead.

=== Teuta ===
On 21 January 2020, Hebaj returned to Kategoria Superiore by inking a six-month contract with Teuta. He made his debut on 2 February in the 2–1 away loss to Tirana, and scored his first goal in the 5–1 away win against Luftëtari on 20 June.

He concluded the second half of 2019–20 season with two goals from 15 league appearances. On 31 August, Hebaj scored a brace in the 2–1 win against Tirana at Elbasan Arena for the 2020 Albanian Supercup, giving Teuta its first silverware of the new season.

However, Hebaj underperformed in the league, recording only one goal in 11 appearances in the first half of the season, which lead the club to terminate his contract by mutual consent.

=== Shkëndija ===
In January 2021, following his release by Teuta, Hebaj joined KF Shkëndija in North Macedonia on a two-and-a-half contract.

=== Return to Teuta ===
On 4 January 2022, Teuta announced to have resigned Hebaj for an undisclosed fee.

=== Andijon ===
In February 2023, Hebaj signed a two-year contract with FK Andijon in Uzbekistan as a free agent.

=== Al-Orobah ===
On 31 January 2024, Hebaj joined Saudi First Division League club Al-Orobah.

=== CS Sfaxien ===
On 8 September 2024, Tunisian Ligue Professionnelle 1 club CS Sfaxien announced the signing of Hebaj to a two-year contract.

== International career ==
=== Albania U17 ===
Hebaj was called up by Albania under-17 team coach Džemal Mustedanagić to participate in the 2015 UEFA European Under-17 Championship qualification where Albania was placed in Group 9. He made his debut on 8 October in the first match against Norway where he appeared as a second-half substitute in an eventual 3–0 defeat. He went on to play in the remaining two matches as Albania failed to pass the group, finishing in third position.

=== Albania U19 ===
In November 2015, Hebaj was called to the under-19s by the coach Arjan Bellaj for the 2016 UEFA European Under-19 Championship qualification. He managed to play in all three matches in Group 8, as Albania was eliminated in the process, finishing third.

=== Albania U20 ===
He received his first call up for the Albania under-20 side by Alban Bushi for the friendly match against Georgia U20 on 14 November 2017. He debuted for under-20 team against Georgia playing the full 90-minutes match, finished in a 3–0 loss.

=== Albania U21 ===
Hebaj received the first call-up at under-21 squad by coach Redi Jupi for the closing 2017 UEFA European Under-21 Championship qualification match against Israel on 10 October 2016. However, he was an unused substitute as Albania was defeated 4–0.

Hebaj was called up by coach Alban Bushi for the friendly against France on 5 June 2017 and the 2019 UEFA European Under-21 Championship qualification opening match against Estonia one week later. He made his competitive debut on 5 June 2017 coming on as a substitute of a 3–0 home defeat to France.

Hebaj scored his first goals for under-21 side in November 2018 in a double friendly against Malta; he scored and won a penalty kick in the first match at Selman Stërmasi Stadium on 16th which was won 2–0, while three days later scored a brace at Loro Boriçi Stadium in another Albania win.

== Career statistics ==
=== Club ===
As of 21 October 2023

Club statistics
Club	Season	League			Cup		Europe (Note: Including continental competitions, such as UEFA Champions League and UEFA Europa League)		Total	
Club	Season	Division	Apps	Goals	Apps	Goals	Apps	Goals	Apps	Goals
Vllaznia Shkodër	2015–16	Kategoria Superiore	0	0	1	0	—		1	0
Vllaznia Shkodër	2016–17	Kategoria Superiore	23	4	2	0	—		25	4
Vllaznia Shkodër	Total		23	4	3	0	—		26	4
→Vllaznia B (loan)	2016–17	Kategoria e Dytë	3	2	—		—		3	2
Domžale	2017–18	Slovenian PrvaLiga	14	4	1	1	—		15	5
Domžale	2017–18	Slovenian PrvaLiga	0	0	0	0	0	0	0	0
→Partizani Tirana (loan)	2018–19	Kategoria Superiore	21	4	4	4	—		25	8
Vorskla Poltava	2019–20	Ukrainian Premier League	5	0	–		—		5	0
Teuta Durrës	2019–20	Kategoria Superiore	15	2	6	0	—		21	2
Teuta Durrës	2020–21	Kategoria Superiore	11	1	2	2	2	1	15	4
Shkëndija	2020–21	Macedonian First League	15	4	0	0	2	0	17	4
Shkëndija	2021–22	Macedonian First League	11	0	0	0	2	0	13	0
Teuta Durrës	2021–22	Kategoria Superiore	20	10	4	3	—		24	13
Teuta Durrës	2022–23	Kategoria Superiore	15	1	2	1	—		17	2
Andijon	2023	Uzbekistan Super League	20	12	3	2	—		23	14
Career total			170	42	25	13	6	1	201	56
