= Endri Dema =

Albanian footballer (born 2004)

Personal information
- Full name: Endri Dema
- Date of birth: 17 July 2004 (age 22)
- Place of birth: Durrës, Albania
- Position: Goalkeeper

Team information
- Current team: Teuta
- Number: 75

Youth career
- 2015–2017: Djemtë e Detit
- 2017–2021: Teuta

Senior career*
| Years | Team | Apps | (Gls) |
| 2021– | Teuta | 26 | (0) |
| 2022– | → Teuta U21 | 18 | (0) |

International career^{‡}
| 2022 | Albania U19 | 4 | (0) |
| 2022– | Albania U21 | 1 | (0) |
| 2022– | Albania | 0 | (0) |
- * Club domestic league appearances and goals as of 1 June 2024 ‡ National team caps and goals as of 1 September 2023

Endri Dema (born 17 July 2004) is an Albanian professional footballer who plays as a goalkeeper for Albanian club Teuta.

== Club career ==
=== Early career ===
Dema was born in Durrës, Albania and began his youth career with local club Djemtë e Detit in 2015 before joining the youth setup at Teuta as a 13-year-old. He would go on to play for the club's under-15s initially before progressing through to the under-17s and then the under-19s before joining the first team during the 2021–22 Kategoria Superiore season.

== International career ==
Dema received his first call up for the Albania national from head coach Edoardo Reja for a friendly against Saudi Arabia on 26 October 2022, where he was an unused substitute.

== Career statistics ==
=== Club ===
As of 1 September 2023

Club statistics
| Club | Season | League | | | Cup | | Europe (Note: Including continental competitions, such as UEFA Champions League and UEFA Europa League) | | Other (Note: Including other competitions, such as Albanian Supercup) | | Total | |
| Club | Season | Division | Apps | Goals | Apps | Goals | Apps | Goals | Apps | Goals | Apps | Goals |
|---|---|---|---|---|---|---|---|---|---|---|---|---|
| Teuta | 2021–22 | Kategoria Superiore | 4 | 0 | 2 | 0 | 0 | 0 | 0 | 0 | 6 | 0 |
| Teuta | 2022–23 | Kategoria Superiore | 3 | 0 | 1 | 0 | — | | — | | 4 | 0 |
| Teuta | 2023–24 | Kategoria Superiore | 0 | 0 | 0 | 0 | — | | — | | 0 | 0 |
| Teuta | Total | | 7 | 0 | 3 | 0 | — | | — | | 10 | 0 |
| Teuta U21 | 2021–22 | Kategoria Superiore U-21 | 0 | 0 | — | | — | | — | | 0 | 0 |
| Teuta U21 | 2022–23 | Kategoria Superiore U-21 | 18 | 0 | — | | — | | — | | 18 | 0 |
| Teuta U21 | Total | | 18 | 0 | — | | — | | — | | 18 | 0 |
| Career total | | | 25 | 0 | 3 | 0 | 0 | 0 | 0 | 0 | 28 | 0 |
