= Renato Arapi =

Albanian professional footballer

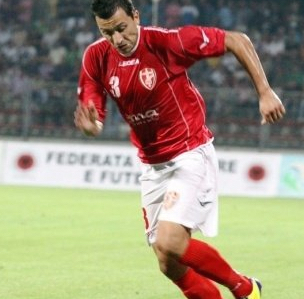
- Arapi in 2011

Personal information
- Date of birth: 28 August 1986 (age 40)
- Place of birth: Sukth, Durrës, PSR Albania
- Height: 1.86 m (6 ft 1 in)
- Positions: Left-back; centre-back

Team information
- Current team: Ohod Club (assistant coach)

Youth career
- 1993–2002: Teuta
- 2002–2003: Dinamo Tirana

Senior career*
Years	Team	Apps	(Gls)
2003–2005	Dinamo Tirana	1	(0)
2003–2004	→ Erzeni (loan)	2	(0)
2005–2010	Besa	92	(3)
2007–2009	→ Silkeborg (loan)	23	(0)
2009–2010	→ Shkumbini (loan)	16	(0)
2010–2016	Skënderbeu	150	(5)
2016–2018	Boluspor	48	(1)
2018–2019	Afjet Afyonspor	8	(0)
2019–2021	Teuta	78	(3)
Total		418	(12)

International career
2004–2005	Albania U18	13	(0)
2005–2006	Albania U19	11	(1)
2006–2008	Albania U21	19	(0)
2011–2015	Albania	4	(0)

Managerial career
- 2021–2022: Teuta
- 2022–: Ohod Club (assistant)
- * Club domestic league appearances and goals

Renato Arapi (born 28 August 1986) is an Albanian professional football coach and former left-back and centre-back. He is an assistant coach with the Saudi club Ohod Club.

== Club career ==
=== Early career ===
Arapi first joined local club Teuta Durrës in 1993 as a young child, where he would remain for nine years, playing for the different youth teams within the club before leaving in 2002 to join Dinamo Tirana. Following his move he was placed into the U19 side with Dinamo Tirana, where his impressive displays earned him a call up to the senior side towards the end of the 2002–03 season, where he made his professional debut against his first club Teuta Durrës on 3 May 2003 in a 2–0 loss for Arapi's side. He was loaned out to Albanian First Division side Erzeni Shijak for the 2003–04 season, where he failed to break through into the first team and made two appearances for the club during his loan spell before returning to Dinamo Tirana. In the summer transfer window in 2005, Arapi left Dinamo Tirana after failing to establish himself in the first team at the club, and he joined newly promoted Albanian Superliga side Besa Kavajë.

=== Besa Kavajë ===
Arapi joined Besa Kavajë and quickly established himself as a first team regular, playing in 19 league games and scoring one goal in his first season with the club, helping them to a respectable mid table 5th finish. The following season Besa Kavajë continued their good performances in the league, finishing once again in mid table, 6th out of 12 teams. Arapi was also a key figure in the club's Albanian Cup campaign which saw him win his first major trophy after beating Teuta Durrës 3–2 in the final. The following season he played the first half of the season with Besa Kavajë before going on a trial with Danish side Silkeborg and eventually joining the club on loan in January 2008 after impressing the management.

=== Silkeborg ===
He joined newly relegated Danish 1st Division side Silkeborg as a 21-year-old on a one-year loan deal from Besa Kavajë in January 2008 after initially impressing the club on trial. He joined the club mid season and featured in 10 league games, helping his side to a 3rd-place finish at the end of the 2007–08 season, missing out on the second promotion place to SønderjyskE. The following season he struggled for playing time, and only featured in 13 league games, but his side had a successful season in which they finished as runners-up in the league and earned promotion to the Danish Superliga. His loan deal expired at the end of the 2008–09 season and Silkeborg did not take up the option to sign Arapi permanently, thus meaning that he returned to his parent club Besa Kavajë.

=== Return to Albania ===
After a spell away from Albanian football, Arapi returned to his homeland in the summer of 2009 and quickly became an important first team player once again at Besa Kavajë, who had one of their best seasons in their history, after they finished as runners-up in the Albanian Superliga and they won the Albanian Cup. Arapi played in 31 league games and was a key driving force in Besa Kavajë's cup success, and he scored in the cup final against Vllaznia Shkodër in the 85th minute to take it to extra time, which is when Besa won the cup 2–1 over 120 minutes.

=== Skënderbeu Korçë ===
On 12 June 2015, Arapi signed a new one-year extension to his contract, lengthening his Skënderbeu Korçë career to six seasons.

On 14 June 2016, Arapi officially announced his departure from the club after six years via an open later to the fans. He stated that the left the club for familial reasons. He, along with Bledi Shkëmbi and Orges Shehi were the only players that won six consecutive league titles for the club.

=== Partizani Tirana ===
On 17 June 2016, Arapi joined fellow Albanian Superliga side Partizani Tirana on free transfer, signing a one-year contract. He was given the squad number 3, and made his competitive debut on 28 June in 2016–17 UEFA Europa League first qualifying round against Slovan Bratislava, which ended in a goalless draw.

=== Back to Teuta Durrës ===
On 30 January 2019, Arapi moved back to his home country after over two years in Turkey, and joined Teuta Durrës. After helping them win three trophies as captain, he retired on 19 August 2021.

== Post-playing career ==
After retiring from playing, on 20 August 2021, Teuta announced that Arapi would become their new sporting director.

== International career ==
Arapi was selected by Josip Kuže for a friendly against Argentina on 20 June 2011, receiving thus his first call-up to the senior side. He made his debut in the game which ended in a 4–0 loss by entering as an 81st-minute substitute.

== Career statistics ==
=== Club ===
As of 6 August 2015

Appearances and goals by club, season and competition
Club	Season	League			Cup		Europe		Other		Total	
Club	Season	Division	Apps	Goals	Apps	Goals	Apps	Goals	Apps	Goals	Apps	Goals
Dinamo Tirana	2002–03	Albanian Superliga	1	0			—		—		1	0
Dinamo Tirana	2003–04	Albanian Superliga	0	0			—		—		0	0
Dinamo Tirana	2004–05	Albanian Superliga	0	0			—		—		0	0
Dinamo Tirana	Total		1	0			—		—		1	0
Erzeni Shijak	2003–04	Albanian First Division	2	0			—		—		2	0
Besa Kavajë	2005–06	Albanian Superliga	19	1			—		—		19	1
Besa Kavajë	2006–07	Albanian Superliga	27	1			—		—		27	1
Besa Kavajë	2007–08	Albanian Superliga	15	1			3 (Note: Appearance(s) in UEFA Europa League)	0	1 (Note: Appearance in Albanian Supercup)	0	19	1
Besa Kavajë	2009–10	Albanian Superliga	31	0	6	1	—		—		37	1
Besa Kavajë	Total		92	3	6	1	3	0	1	0	102	4
Silkeborg IF	2007–08	Danish 1st Division	10	0			—		—		10	0
Silkeborg IF	2008–09	Danish 1st Division	13	0			—		—		13	0
Silkeborg IF	Total		23	0			—		—		23	0
Shkumbini Peqin	2010–11	Albanian Superliga	16	0			—		—		16	0
KF Skënderbeu Korçë	2010–11	Albanian Superliga	15	0	2	0	—		—		17	0
KF Skënderbeu Korçë	2011–12	Albanian Superliga	23	0	10	0	2 (Note: Appearance(s) in UEFA Champions League)	0	1	0	36	0
KF Skënderbeu Korçë	2012–13	Albanian Superliga	15	1	3	1	2	0	1	0	21	2
KF Skënderbeu Korçë	2013–14	Albanian Superliga	30	3	7	0	5	0	1	0	42	3
KF Skënderbeu Korçë	2014–15	Albanian Superliga	33	0	3	0	2	0	1	0	39	0
KF Skënderbeu Korçë	2015–16	Albanian Superliga	34	1	8	0	8 (Note: Appearance(s) in both UEFA Champions League and UEFA Europa League)	0	1	0	43	1
KF Skënderbeu Korçë	Total		150	5	33	1	19	0	5	0	198	6
Partizani Tirana	2016–17	Albanian Superliga	—		—		6	0	—		6	0
Boluspor	2016–17	TFF First League	19	0	3	0	—		—		22	0
Boluspor	2017–18	TFF First League	29	1	1	0	—		—		30	1
Boluspor	Total		48	1	4	0	—		—		52	1
Afyonspor	2018–19	TFF First League	8	0	2	0	—		—		10	0
Teuta Durrës	2018–19	Albanian Superliga	15	1	2	0	—		—		17	1
Teuta Durrës	2019–20	Albanian Superliga	30	1	5	1	2	0	—		37	2
Teuta Durrës	2020–21	Albanian Superliga	33	1	3	1	2	0	1	0	39	2
Teuta Durrës	2021–22	Albanian Superliga	—		—		6	0	—		6	0
Teuta Durrës	Total		78	3	10	2	10	0	1	0	99	5
Career total			418	12	55	4	38	0	7	0	516	16

=== International ===
As of 15 June 2016

Appearances and goals by national team and year
National team	Year	Apps	Goals
Albania	2011	1	0
Albania	2012	1	0
Albania	2013	2	0
Total		4	0

== Honours ==
Besa Kavajë

- Albanian Cup: 2006–07, 2009–10

Silkeborg

- Danish 1st Division runner-up: 2008–09

Skënderbeu Korçë

- Albanian Superliga (6): 2010–11, 2011–12, 2012–13, 2013–14, 2014–15, 2015–16
- Albanian Supercup: 2013, 2014

Teuta Durrës

- Albanian Superliga: 2020–21
- Albanian Supercup: 2020

Individual

- Albanian Superliga Team of the Year: 2013–14
