= Asion Daja =

Albanian football player (born 1990)

Personal information
- Full name: Asion Isa Daja
- Date of birth: 14 March 1990 (age 36)
- Place of birth: Tirana, Albania
- Height: 1.71 m (5 ft 7 in)
- Position: Midfielder

Team information
- Current team: Teuta Durrës
- Number: 23

Youth career
- 1998–2000: Pallati i Pionerëve
- 2000–2007: Dinamo Tirana

Senior career*
Years	Team	Apps	(Gls)
2007–2012	Dinamo Tirana	31	(0)
2009–2010	→ Shkumbini (loan)	8	(0)
2012–2014	Kastrioti	40	(1)
2014–2016	Partizani Tirana	47	(0)
2016–2019	Tirana	79	(2)
2019–2020	Skënderbeu Korçë	28	(0)
2020–2022	Teuta Durrës	52	(1)
2022–2023	Dinamo Tirana	24	(0)
2023–	Teuta Durrës	34	(0)

International career^{‡}
2006–2007	Albania U17	3	(0)
2007–2009	Albania U19	3	(0)
2009–2010	Albania U21	1	(0)
- * Club domestic league appearances and goals as of 1 June 2024 ‡ National team caps and goals as of 12 July 2016

Asion Daja (born 14 March 1990) is an Albanian football player who plays as a midfielder for Teuta Durrës.

By signing with Tirana in July 2016, Daja become one of the few players to have represented all the capital teams.

Daja represented Albania at youth levels, playing for the U17, U19 and U21 teams.

== Club career ==
=== Youth career ===
Daja was born in the Albanian capital Tirana, which is where he began playing football at the age of 8 with local amateur youth side Pallati i Pionerëve under the guidance of coach Hyqmet Kuka. In 2000, he won the Ramazan Kuka Cup with Pallati i Pionerëve, a competition in honour of former international referee Ramazan Kuka. In 2000, he joined the Dinamo Tirana academy where he joined the under-10 side. He worked his way through the ranks and won many regional, national and even international competitions. He excelled in the youth setup at Dinamo, especially in the under-17s and under-19s between 2005 and 2008.

=== Dinamo Tirana ===
Towards the end of the 2007–08 season he began to train with the senior Dinamo Tirana side, and with the team firmly in 1st place he was given his senior debut on 10 May 2008 against Besa Kavajë in a 2–1 win; Daja came on in the 89th minute for Goran Vincetić with Dinamo already 2–0 up. Just four days later he came on in the 54th minute away against Vllaznia Shkodër and scored his first ever senior goal in the closing stages of the game to make it 3–0 for the team. He won the league with Dinamo in his debut season.

For the 2008–09 season Daja became first team player but failed to establish himself in the starting line up due to his age and lack of experience. In total he made 13 league appearances and also featured in the Albanian Cup twice. In the league he started just 4 games, and played 90 minutes just twice.

In the 2009–10 season he struggled to play games and was loaned out to fellow Albanian Superliga side Shkumbini Peqin in January for the remainder of the season. He played in 8 league games for Shkumbini Peqin in the second half of the season and managed to help keep the side up. He returned to Dinamo Tirana at the end of the season who were crowned champions of Albania once again.

He played for Dinamo Tirana in qualifying for the 2010–11 UEFA Champions League.

=== Partizani Tirana ===
On 8 July 2014, Daja joined Partizani Tirana on a free transfer, signing an initial one-year contract with an option of a further one.

=== Tirana ===
In July 2016, Daja begun training with Tirana, and on 11 July he penned a two-year contract.

== International career ==
Daja was called up to play for under-17 side in October 2006 for the UEFA European qualifying match against Finland. On 15 October, he made his competitive debut by playing in a 4–1 loss to Finland.

== Personal life ==
Daja undertook a part-time degree at the Academy of Physical and Sports Education Vojo Kushi, commonly known in Albanian as the Universiteti i Sporteve Të Tiranës. He completed his course from the faculty of movement science in 2014 with 61 points from 100.

On 18 February 2004 at the age of 13 he was a match-day child mascot for Albania's friendly match against Sweden. He walked onto the field at the Qemal Stafa Stadium with striker Alban Bushi in the 2–1 win for Albania.

== Career statistics ==
As of 12 July 2016

Club	Season	League			Cup		Continental		Other		Total	
Club	Season	Division	Apps	Goals	Apps	Goals	Apps	Goals	Apps	Goals	Apps	Goals
Dinamo Tirana	2007–08	Albanian Superliga	2	1	0	0	—		—		2	1
Dinamo Tirana	2008–09	Albanian Superliga	13	0	2	0	0	0	0	0	15	0
Dinamo Tirana	2009–10	Albanian Superliga	2	0	3	0	—		—		5	0
Dinamo Tirana	2010–11	Albanian Superliga	9	0	4	1	1 (Note: All appearance(s) in UEFA Champions League)	0	1 (Note: Appearance in Albanian Supercup)	0	15	1
Dinamo Tirana	2011–12	Albanian Superliga	23	0	1	1	—		—		24	1
Dinamo Tirana	Total		49	1	10	2	1	0	1	0	61	3
Shkumbini Peqin	2009–10	Albanian Superliga	8	0	3	0	—		—		11	0
Shkumbini Peqin	Total		8	0	3	2	—		—		11	0
Kastrioti Krujë	2012–13	Albanian Superliga	15	1	5	0	—		—		20	1
Kastrioti Krujë	2013–14	Albanian Superliga	25	0	3	0	—		—		28	0
Kastrioti Krujë	Total		40	1	8	0	—		—		48	1
Partizani Tirana	2014–15	Albanian Superliga	21	0	4	0	—		—		25	0
Partizani Tirana	2015–16	Albanian Superliga	26	0	4	0	0	0	—		30	1
Partizani Tirana	Total		47	1	8	0	0	0	—		55	1
Tirana	2016–17	Albanian Superliga	31	0	6	0	—		—		37	0
Tirana	2017–18	Albanian First Division	3	0	1	0	2	0	1	0	7	0
Tirana	Total		34	0	7	0	2	0	1	0	44	0
Career total			178	3	36	2	3	0	2	0	219	5

== Honours ==
Dinamo Tirana

- Albanian Superliga: (2) 2007–08, 2009–10
- Albanian Supercup:(1) 2008

Tirana

- Albanian Cup: (1) 2016–17
- Albanian Supercup: (1) 2017
- Albanian First Division : Winner Group B
- Albanian First Division : 2017-2018

Teuta

- Albanian Superliga: (1) 2020–21
- Albanian Supercup:(2) 2020, 2021
