= Erdenis Gurishta =

Albanian footballer

Personal information
- Date of birth: 24 April 1995 (age 31)
- Place of birth: Shkodër, Albania
- Height: 1.83 m (6 ft 0 in)
- Position: Right-back

Team information
- Current team: Vllaznia Shkodër
- Number: 2

Youth career
- –2014: Vllaznia Shkodër

Senior career*
Years	Team	Apps	(Gls)
2014–2023	Vllaznia Shkodër	207	(7)
2014	→ Veleçiku (loan)	9	(0)
2015–2017	→ Vllaznia Shkodër B	6	(1)
2023–2024	CSKA 1948 II	6	(0)
2023–2024	CSKA 1948	9	(0)
2024–	Vllaznia Shkodër	63	(1)

International career^{‡}
2015–2016	Albania U21	2	(0)
2022–	Albania	1	(0)
- * Club domestic league appearances and goals as of 24 June 2026 ‡ National team caps and goals as of 28 October 2022

Erdenis Gurishta (born 24 April 1995) is an Albanian footballer who plays as a right-back for Vllaznia Shkodër in the Abissnet Superiore. In June 2025 it was announced that he will remain with Vllaznia Shkodër until 2027.

== Career statistics ==
=== Club ===
As of 22 December 2017

Club statistics
Club	Season	League			Cup		Europe (Note: Including continental competitions, such as UEFA Champions League and UEFA Europa League)		Other (Note: Including other competitions, such as Albanian Supercup)		Total	
Club	Season	Division	Apps	Goals	Apps	Goals	Apps	Goals	Apps	Goals	Apps	Goals
Veleçiku Koplik	2014–15	Albanian First Division	9	0	3	0	—		—		12	0
Vllaznia Shkodër	2014–15	Albanian Superliga	7	0	—		—		—		7	0
Vllaznia Shkodër	2015–16	Albanian Superliga	13	0	4	0	—		—		17	0
Vllaznia Shkodër	2016–17	Albanian Superliga	21	2	3	0	—		—		24	2
Vllaznia Shkodër	2017–18	Albanian Superliga	12	0	4	0	—		—		16	0
Vllaznia Shkodër	Total		53	2	8	0	—		—		61	2
Vllaznia Shkodër B	2015–16	Albanian Third Division	3	1	—		—		—		3	1
Vllaznia Shkodër B	2016–17	Albanian Second Division	3	0	—		—		—		3	0
Vllaznia Shkodër B	Total		6	1	—		—		—		6	1
Career total			68	3	11	0	—		—		79	3
