= Florent Avdyli =

Kosovo Albanian footballer

Personal information
- Date of birth: 10 July 1993 (age 33)
- Place of birth: Dobroshec, Drenas, FR Yugoslavia
- Height: 1.83 m (6 ft 0 in)
- Position: Central midfielder

Team information
- Current team: Kosova München

Youth career
- Shkolla e Futbollit Kurda

Senior career*
Years	Team	Apps	(Gls)
2013	Hajvalia		
2014	Fushë Kosova		
2014	Feronikeli		
2015–2017	Trepça	4+	(0+)
2017–2018	Liria	13	(1)
2018–2021	Teuta	81	(3)
2021	Prishtina	4	(0)
2022	Teuta	8	(0)
2022–2023	Drenica	9	(0)
2023	Malisheva	8	(0)
2023–2025	Feronikeli	56	(5)
2025–2026	Vushtrria	0	(0)
2026–	Kosova München	0	(0)
- * Club domestic league appearances and goals as of 26 June 2025

Florent Avdyli (born 10 July 1993) is a Kosovar professional footballer who plays as a central midfielder for German club Kosova München.

== Career statistics ==
=== Club ===
As of 17 March 2021

Appearances and goals by club, season and competition
Club	Season	League			Cup		Europe		Other (Note: Including other competitions, such as Albanian Supercup)		Total	
Club	Season	Division	Apps	Goals	Apps	Goals	Apps	Goals	Apps	Goals	Apps	Goals
Teuta	2018–19	Kategoria Superiore	25	0	3	0	—		—		28	5
Teuta	2019–20	Kategoria Superiore	32	3	8	0	1	0	—		41	3
Teuta	2020–21	Kategoria Superiore	24	0	1	0	2	0	1	0	28	0
Teuta	Total		81	3	12	0	4	0	1	0	97	3
Prishtina	2021–22	Kosovar Superliga	4	0	—		—		1	0	5	0
Teuta	2021–22	Kategoria Superiore	7	0	1	0	1	0	—		9	0
Career total			92	3	13	0	4	0	2	0	111	3

== Honours ==
=== Club ===
Teuta

- Kupa e Shqipërisë: 2019–20,
- Superkupa e Shqipërisë: 2020
- Kategoria Superiore: 2020-21
