= Sherif Kallaku =

Albanian footballer (born 1998)

Personal information
- Date of birth: 1 March 1998 (age 28)
- Place of birth: Fushë-Krujë, Albania
- Height: 1.82 m (6 ft 0 in)
- Position: Midfielder

Team information
- Current team: Vllaznia Shkodër
- Number: 10

Youth career
- 2011–2012: Iliria
- 2012–2014: Olimpic
- 2014: Tirana
- 2014–2015: Partizani
- 2015–2016: Akademia e Futbollit
- 2016–2017: Cremonese

Senior career*
Years	Team	Apps	(Gls)
2017–2018	Laçi	27	(1)
2018–2020	Teuta	65	(21)
2020–2022	Lokomotiva	26	(2)
2021	→ Teuta (loan)	15	(1)
2022	→ Partizani (loan)	13	(1)
2022–2023	Tirana	15	(2)
2023	Teuta	20	(6)
2023–2025	Sepsi OSK	54	(4)
2025–	Vllaznia Shkodër	38	(5)

International career^{‡}
2015–2016	Albania U19	4	(0)
2017–2020	Albania U21	16	(1)
2020–	Albania	7	(0)
- * Club domestic league appearances and goals as of 24 June 2026 ‡ National team caps and goals as of 9 November 2022

Sherif Kallaku (born 1 March 1998) is an Albanian professional footballer who plays as a central midfielder for Kategoria Superiore side Vllaznia Shkodër.

== Club career ==
=== Laçi ===
In July 2017, Kallaku signed his first professional contract and joined Kategoria Superiore side Laçi. He took the squad number 59, the number of his deceased father's birthday, and made his professional debut on 10 September in the opening matchday away against Partizani, coming on the second half as a substitute and netting a tap-in after a howler from goalkeeper Dashamir Xhika, as Laçi won 2–0.

=== Teuta return ===
On 13 January 2023, Teuta announced to have signed Kallaku on a permanent deal.

== International career ==
Kallaku made his under-21 debut on 25 March 2017 in the friendly against Moldova which ended in a goalless draw.

He received his first call up for the Albania under-20 side by same coach of the under-21 team Alban Bushi for the friendly match against Georgia U20 on 14 November 2017.

He made his senior national team debut on 11 October 2020 in a Nations League game against Kazakhstan.

== Career statistics ==
=== Club ===
As of 9 May 2025

Appearances and goals by club, season and competition
Club	Season	League			National cup (Note: Includes Albanian Cup, Croatian Cup, Cupa României)		Europe		Other		Total	
Club	Season	Division	Apps	Goals	Apps	Goals	Apps	Goals	Apps	Goals	Apps	Goals
Laçi	2017–18	Kategoria Superiore	27	1	6	0	—		—		33	1
Teuta	2018–19	Kategoria Superiore	33	7	5	1	—		—		38	8
Teuta	2019–20	Kategoria Superiore	32	14	7	2	2 (Note: Appearances in UEFA Europa League)	1	—		41	17
Teuta	Total		65	21	12	3	2	1	0	0	79	25
Lokomotiva	2020–21	Prva HNL	26	2	1	0	2 (Note: One appearance in UEFA Champions League, one appearance in UEFA Europa League)	0	—		29	2
Teuta (loan)	2021–22	Kategoria Superiore	15	1	3	1	6 (Note: Two appearances in UEFA Champions League, four appearances and one goal in UEFA Europa Conference League)	1	1 (Note: Appearance in Albanian Supercup)	0	24	3
Partizani (loan)	2021–22	Kategoria Superiore	13	1	4	0	—		—		17	1
Tirana	2022–23	Kategoria Superiore	15	2	0	0	—		1	0	16	2
Teuta	2022–23	Kategoria Superiore	20	6	5	2	—		—		25	8
Sepsi OSK	2023–24	Liga I	26	4	3	0	1 (Note: Appearance in UEFA Europa Conference League)	0	0	0	30	4
Sepsi OSK	2024–25	Liga I	28	0	2	1	—		—		30	1
Sepsi OSK	Total		54	4	5	1	1	0	0	0	60	5
Career total			235	38	36	7	11	2	2	0	284	47

=== International ===
As of match played 9 November 2022

Appearances and goals by national team and year
National team	Year	Apps	Goals
Albania	2020	3	0
Albania	2021	2	0
Albania	2022	2	0
Total		7	0

== Honours ==
Laçi

- Albanian Cup runner-up: 2017–18

Teuta

- Albanian Cup: 2019–20
- Albanian Supercup: 2021

Tirana

- Albanian Supercup: 2022

Sepsi OSK

- Supercupa României: 2023
