= Ennur Totre =

Macedonian footballer

Personal information
- Full name: Ennur Totre; Енур Тотре
- Date of birth: 29 October 1996 (age 30)
- Place of birth: Tetovo, Macedonia
- Height: 1.82 m (6 ft 0 in)
- Position: Midfielder

Team information
- Current team: Gjilani
- Number: 20

Senior career*
| Years | Team | Apps | (Gls) |
| 2014–2021 | Shkëndija | 161 | (11) |
| 2021–2022 | Tirana | 34 | (5) |
| 2022–2024 | Vorskla Poltava | 3 | (0) |
| 2024–2025 | → Shkëndija (loan) | 45 | (5) |
| 2022–2025 | Sakaryaspor | 12 | (0) |
| 2025– | Gjilani | 23 | (0) |

International career^{‡}
| 2016–2018 | Macedonia U21 | 7 | (0) |
| 2020– | North Macedonia | 2 | (0) |
- * Club domestic league appearances and goals as of 22 June 2026 ‡ National team caps and goals as of 19 November 2020

Ennur Totre (Macedonian: Енур Тотре; born 29 October 1996) is a Macedonian footballer who plays as a midfielder for Kosovan side Gjilani and the North Macedonia national team. He also holds Albanian passport.

== Club career ==
He started his career in 2014 with Shkëndija where he won the Macedonian First League in 2017–18, 2018–19 and 2020–21. In 2021 he moved to Tirana where he won the Kategoria Superiore in 2021–22. In August 2022 he signed for Vorskla Poltava in Ukrainian Premier League.

== International career ==
Totre made his international debut for North Macedonia on 14 October 2020 in the UEFA Nations League, coming on as a substitute in the 88th minute for Boban Nikolov against Georgia. The home match finished as a 1–1 draw.

== Career statistics ==
=== International ===
As of 14 October 2020

North Macedonia
| Year | Apps | Goals |
|---|---|---|
| 2020 | 1 | 0 |
| Total | 1 | 0 |

== Honours ==
Tirana

- Kategoria Superiore: (1) 2021–22

Shkëndija

- Macedonian First League: (3) 2017–18, 2018–19, 2020–21
- Macedonian Football Cup: (2) 2016, 2018
