= Harallamb Qaqi =

Albanian footballer (born 1993)

Personal information
- Date of birth: 17 September 1993 (age 33)
- Place of birth: Tirana, Albania
- Height: 1.96 m (6 ft 5 in)
- Position: Centre-back

Team information
- Current team: Teuta
- Number: 27

Youth career
- 2010–2012: AEK Athens
- 2012–2013: Varese

Senior career*
Years	Team	Apps	(Gls)
2013–2016	Verona	0	(0)
2013–2014	→ Carpi (loan)	5	(0)
2014–2015	→ Barletta (loan)	17	(1)
2015–2016	→ Partizani Tirana (loan)	0	(0)
2016–2018	Laçi	64	(3)
2018–2019	Kukësi	8	(0)
2019	Kamza	4	(0)
2019–2020	Alki Oroklini		
2020–2021	Skënderbeu	13	(1)
2021–2022	Drenica	25	(2)
2022–2024	Teuta	57	(0)
2024–2025	Elbasani	19	(1)
2025–	Teuta	4	(0)

International career
2011	Albania U18	2	(0)
2011	Albania U19	2	(0)
2013–2014	Albania U21	1	(0)
- * Club domestic league appearances and goals as of 13 May 2026

Harallamb Qaqi (born 17 September 1993) is an Albanian professional footballer who plays as a centre-back for Kategoria Superiore club Teuta.

== Club career ==
=== Early career ===
Kiakis started his youth career at AEK Athens, played some years and in 2012 he moved to Varese, where he stayed for a year.

=== Verona ===
On 26 July 2013 he moved to Hellas Verona and quickly loaned to Carpi until the end of the 2013–14 season.

==== Carpi (on loan) ====
He included in the first team of Carpi for the match against Ternana, played on 24 August 2013 where Kiakis was an unused substitute for the entire match, which finished in the 1–0 loss.

He made it his professional debut with Carpi on 30 May 2014 in the closing match of the 2013–14 Serie B against Juve Stabia by coming on as a substitute in the 90+1' minute in place of Roberto Inglese, the scorer of the opening goal of the match which finished as a 0–2 victory in the end.

==== Barleta (on loan) ====
He loaned out to Barletta in Lega Pro Prima Divisione for the 2014–15 season. He made it his debut on 1 November 2014 by playing as a starter and finishing the full 90-minutes match between Barletta and Paganese which finished as a 2–1 loss where Kiakis scored an own-goal in the 83rd minute.

=== Alki Oroklini ===
On 30 August 2019, Qaqi joined Cypriot club Alki Oroklini.

== International career ==
He started his international career with the youth national team Albania U-19, where he first called up in the team to participate in the 2012 UEFA European Under-19 Championship qualification, playing his first match on 5 October 2011 as the starter against Denmark U-19, where he substituted off in the 72nd minute and the match finished in the loss 1–0 with a later goal of Denmark U-19 scored in the 90+3rd minute. He played two days later in the next fixture match against Austria U-19, where he included again in the starting line up and received a yellow card in the 64th minute, then the second yellow card in the 71st so he was sent off, and the match finished in a goalless draw 0–0.

After being played for Albania U-19, Kiakis received a call-up by the coach Skënder Gega for the Albania national under-21 football team fixture matches against Hungary U-21 and Bosnia and Herzegovina U-21 respectively on 7 and 11 June 2013, valids for the 2015 UEFA European Under-21 Football Championship qualification. He was an unused substitute for the first match against Hungary U-21, which finished in the 1–2 loss. He made it his debut in the fixture match against Bosnia and Herzegovina U-21 on 11 June 2013, as he included in the starting line up then substituted off for the start of the second half, as the match finished in the 4–1 loss.

== Career statistics ==
=== Club ===
As of 1 November 2014

Season	Club	League country	League		League Cup		Europe		Total	
Season	Club	League country	Apps	Goals	Apps	Goals	Apps	Goals	Apps	Goals
2013–14	Carpi	Serie B	1	0	0	0	-	-	1	0
Total			1	0	0	0	0	0	1	0
2014–15	Barletta	Lega Pro Prima Divisione	1	0	0	0	-	-	1	0
Total			1	0	0	0	0	0	1	0
Career total			2	0	0	0	0	0	2	0
