= Klaidi Shala =

Albanian footballer

Personal information
- Full name: Klaidi Shala
- Date of birth: 22 March 1998 (age 28)
- Place of birth: Durrës, Albania
- Position: Defender

Youth career
- 2011–2017: Teuta

Senior career*
Years	Team	Apps	(Gls)
2015–2017	Teuta	2	(0)
- * Club domestic league appearances and goals

Klaidi Shala (born 22 March 1998) is an Albanian footballer who most recently played for Teuta Durrës in the Albanian Superliga. He made his professional debut on 26 October 2015 as a 16 year old in a 2–2 draw against KF Laçi, where he started the game and played the full 90 minutes.
