= Bobi Celeski =

Macedonian footballer

Personal information
- Date of birth: 10 June 1997 (age 29)
- Place of birth: Ohrid, Macedonia
- Height: 1.88 m (6 ft 2 in)
- Position: Goalkeeper

Team information
- Current team: Vardar

Senior career*
Years	Team	Apps	(Gls)
–2015	Makedonija GP		
2015	Grosseto		
2015–2016	Mladost CD		
2016–2018	Makedonija GP	13	(0)
2018–2022	Teuta	17	(0)
2022	Skopje	4	(0)
2022–	Vardar	4	(0)

International career
2013–2014	Macedonia U17	11	(0)
2014–2015	Macedonia U18	5	(0)
2015–2016	Macedonia U19	12	(1)
2016	Macedonia U20	3	(0)
- * Club domestic league appearances and goals as of 11 September 2022

Bobi Celeski (Macedonian: Боби Целески, born 10 June 1997) is a Macedonian footballer who plays as a goalkeeper for Macedonian club Vardar. His father was also a professional footballer and goalkeeper, playing for clubs in North Macedonia, Turkey and Hungary, as well as the Macedonian national team between 1994 and 1997.

== Career ==
=== KF Teuta ===
Celeski joined the club in August 2018, being utilized mostly as a backup goalkeeper throughout his first two seasons with the club. He made his competitive debut for the club on 12 September 2018, in a 3–0 victory in the Albanian Cup over KF Turbina. Celeski made his Albanian Superliga debut on 27 January 2019 in a 1–1 home draw with Flamurtari. During his time with the team, they won the Albanian Championship, the Albanian Cup and the Albanian Supercup.

=== FK Vardar ===
In August 2022 he joined Vardar. During the 2022/2023 season the team finished 3rd on the table and got promoted back to Prva liga.
