= Ledio Beqja =

Albanian footballer

Personal information
- Full name: Ledio Beqja
- Date of birth: 18 June 2001 (age 25)
- Place of birth: Castiglione del Lago, Italy
- Height: 1.83 m (6 ft 0 in)
- Position: Central midfielder

Team information
- Current team: Dinamo City (loan)
- Number: 31

Youth career
- 2011–2014: Sukthi
- 2014–2019: Teuta

Senior career*
Years	Team	Apps	(Gls)
2019–2025	Teuta	121	(5)
2025–	Győr	4	(0)
2025–	→ Dinamo City(loan)	14	(0)

International career
2019–	Albania U19	4	(0)
- * Club domestic league appearances and goals as of 6 March 2026

Ledio Beqja (born 18 June 2001) is an Albanian professional footballer who plays as a central midfielder for Albanian Kategoria Superiore club Dinamo City (loan) from Győr.
