= Melos Bajrami =

Macedonian footballer (born 2001)

Personal information
- Date of birth: 29 September 2001 (age 25)
- Place of birth: Resen, Macedonia
- Height: 1.92 m (6 ft 4 in)
- Position: Centre-back

Team information
- Current team: Spartak Trnava
- Number: 16

Youth career
- –2020: Flamurtari
- 2020: Ballkani

Senior career*
Years	Team	Apps	(Gls)
2020–2021	Ballkani	0	(0)
2021–2022	Skënderbeu Korçë	41	(1)
2022–2023	Shkupi	17	(1)
2023	Makedonija G.P.	1	(0)
2023–2024	Gjilani	24	(0)
2024–2026	Vllaznia Shkodër	58	(3)
2026–	Spartak Trnava	1	(0)
- * Club domestic league appearances and goals as of 21 November 2026

Melos Bajrami (born 29 September 2001) is a professional footballer who plays as a centre-back for Slovak side Spartak Trnava. Born in Macedonia, he opted to represent Kosovo at the international level.

== Club career ==
=== Skënderbeu Korçë ===
On 11 January 2021, Bajrami joined Kategoria Superiore side Skënderbeu Korçë. Five days later, he made his debut in a 1–2 home defeat against Partizani Tirana after being named in the starting line-up.

=== Shkupi ===
On 1 July 2022, Bajrami joined Macedonian First League side Shkupi. His debut with Shkupi came four days later in the 2022–23 UEFA Champions League first qualifying round against Lincoln Red Imps after coming on as a substitute at 59th minute in place of Renaldo Cephas. On 13 August 2022, Bajrami made his league debut in a 2–1 home win against Makedonija Ǵorče Petrov after being named in the starting line-up.

In 2026, he signed for Spartak Trnava.

== International career ==
Bajrami was eligible to represent three countries on international level, either Australia, Kosovo or North Macedonia. On 15 March 2021, he received a call-up from Kosovo national under-21 team for the friendly matches against Qatar U23 but did not appear.
