= Aretes of Dyrrachium =

Ancient Greek writer

Aretes (Ancient Greek: Ἀρέτης) of Dyrrachium was an ancient chronographer – that is, a natural philosopher whose work dealt with the construction of calendars. Some of his calculations were mentioned by the ancient Roman writer Censorinus, so we know Aretes lived in or before the 3rd century CE.

Aretes is spoken of as a theorist who devised an astronomical calendar with a very long cycle, lasting approximately 5,552 years, after which the world would be destroyed.
