= Klejdi Daci =

Albanian football player

Personal information
- Date of birth: 22 April 1999 (age 27)
- Place of birth: Tirana, Albania
- Height: 1.86 m (6 ft 1 in)
- Position: Forward

Team information
- Current team: Teuta
- Number: 7

Youth career
- 2013–2014: JA Tirana
- 2014–2016: Term
- 2016–2019: Partizani

Senior career*
Years	Team	Apps	(Gls)
2018–2019	Partizani	0	(0)
2019–2021	Kastrioti	45	(9)
2021–2023	Kukësi	18	(3)
2022	→ Teuta (loan)	15	(3)
2023–2024	Teuta	50	(10)
2024–2025	AGMK	19	(3)
2025	→ Kokand 1912 (loan)	13	(3)
2026–	Teuta	15	(3)
- * Club domestic league appearances and goals as of 13 May 2026

Klejdi Daci (born 22 April 1999) is an Albanian professional footballer who plays as a forward for Teuta.

== Career ==
On 31 January 2023, he signed a contract with the Albanian team Teuta.

OKMK may transfer Albanian central striker Klejdi Daci. At the moment, we have information that a club is seriously interested in him and that the team is in the final stages of negotiations.
