= Ergys Peposhi =

Albanian footballer

Personal information
- Date of birth: 26 August 2000 (age 26)
- Place of birth: Tirana, Albania
- Height: 1.74 m (5 ft 9 in)
- Position: Left winger

Team information
- Current team: Liria

Youth career
- 2016: Kamza
- 2016–2019: Akademia e Futbollit
- 2019: Laçi

Senior career*
Years	Team	Apps	(Gls)
2019	Laçi	0	(0)
2019–2020	Elbasani	23	(2)
2020–2023	Kukësi	55	(2)
2022	→ Teuta	13	(1)
2023–2025	Teuta	62	(7)
2025–2026	Ferizaj	30	(0)
2026–	Liria		

International career^{‡}
2021–	Albania U21	2	(0)
- * Club domestic league appearances and goals as of 17 July 2026 ‡ National team caps and goals as of 17:05, 16 January 2022 (UTC)

Ergys Peposhi (born 26 August 2000) is an Albanian professional footballer who plays as a left winger for Kosovan club Liria.

== Career statistics ==
=== Club ===
As of 15 November 2021

Appearances and goals by club, season and competition
Club	Season	League			Cup		Other		Total	
Club	Season	Division	Apps	Goals	Apps	Goals	Apps	Goals	Apps	Goals
Laçi	2018–19	Kategoria Superiore	0	0	0	0	—		0	0
Elbasani	2019–20	Kategoria e Parë	23	2	1	0	—		24	2
Kukësi	2020–21	Kategoria Superiore	19	1	0	0	—		19	1
Kukësi	2021–22	Kategoria Superiore	8	1	3	0	—		11	1
Kukësi	Total		27	2	3	0	0	0	30	2
Career total			50	4	4	0	0	0	54	4
