= Hristijan Dragarski =

Macedonian football defender

Personal information
- Full name: Hristijan Dragarski
- Date of birth: 16 April 1992 (age 34)
- Place of birth: Bitola, Republic of Macedonia
- Height: 1.84 m (6 ft 0 in)
- Position: Centre-back

Team information
- Current team: Besa Dobërdoll 1976

Youth career
- Pelister

Senior career*
Years	Team	Apps	(Gls)
2009–2014	Pelister	74	(3)
2014–2015	Concordia Chiajna	12	(0)
2015	Radnik Surdulica	0	(0)
2015-2016	Mladost CD		
2017–2018	Pelister	15	(0)
2018	Pobeda	17	(0)
2019	Struga	13	(1)
2020–2021	Pelister	31	(3)
2021	Teuta Durrës	0	(0)
2021–2023	Pelister	25	(1)
2023–	Besa Dobërdoll 1976	0	(0)

International career
2010–2011	Macedonia U19	3	(0)
2013	Macedonia U21	3	(0)
- * Club domestic league appearances and goals as of 18 February 2019

Hristijan Dragarski (Macedonian: Христијан Драгарски; born 16 April 1992) is a Macedonian football defender who currently plays for Besa Dobërdoll 1976.

== Club career ==
After playing 5 seasons with FK Pelister, Dragarski moved abroad in summer 2014 and signed with Romanian Liga I side CS Concordia Chiajna. After one season with Concordia, Dragarski signed in summer 2015 with Serbian side FK Radnik Surdulica which had just been promoted for the first time in their history to the Serbian SuperLiga. However, before even making a league debut, Dragarski left Radnik.

Dragarski joined FC Struga in January 2019.

In June 2021, Dragarski signed with Albanian Champions Teuta Durrës on a one-year contract.

== International career ==
He represented Macedonia at U19 and U21 levels.

== Honours ==
Pelister

- Macedonian Second League: 2011–12
