= Ildi Gruda =

Albanian footballer

Personal information
- Date of birth: 13 December 1999 (age 26)
- Place of birth: Lezhë, Albania
- Height: 1.75 m (5 ft 9 in)
- Position: Midfielder

Team information
- Current team: Egnatia Rrogozhinë
- Number: 77

Youth career
- 2014–2017: Porto Academy
- 2017–2018: Vllaznia

Senior career*
Years	Team	Apps	(Gls)
2018–2019	Valletta	0	(0)
2019–2020	Shënkolli	12	(6)
2020–2023	Teuta Durrës	95	(7)
2023–2025	Vllaznia Shkodër	57	(12)
2025–	Egnatia Rrogozhinë	38	(1)

International career^{‡}
2019	Albania U20	1	(1)
- * Club domestic league appearances and goals as of 25 June 2026 ‡ National team caps and goals as of 15 May 2019

Ildi Gruda (born 13 December 1999) is an Albanian footballer who plays as a midfielder for Egnatia Rrogozhinë in the Kategoria Superiore.

== Career ==
=== Teuta Durrës ===
In January 2020, Gruda moved to Albanian Superliga club Teuta Durrës on a free transfer. He made his league debut for the club on 26 January 2020, coming on as an 81st-minute substitute for Sherif Kallaku in a 1–0 home victory over Bylis.

== Personal life ==
He is related to Brajan Gruda.
