= KF Vllaznia B =

Albanian football club

Vllaznia B
- Full name: Klubi i Futbollit Vllaznia B
- Nicknames: Kuq e Blutë; Djepi i Futbollit Shqiptar
- Founded: 2015
- Ground: Reshit Rusi Stadium
- Capacity: 1,200
- Owner: Bashkia Shkodër
- Manager: Brikeno Bizi
- League: Kategoria e Dytë, Group A
- 2025–26: Kategoria e Tretë, Group A, 1st (promoted)
Home colours	Away colours

Klubi i Futbollit Vllaznia B is a football club based in Shkodër, Albania. It is the reserve team of Vllaznia. The club is currently competing in the Kategoria e Dytë, which is the third tier of football in the country.

== Current squad ==
Note: Flags indicate national team as defined under FIFA eligibility rules; some limited exceptions apply. Players may hold more than one non-FIFA nationality.

No.	Pos.	Nation	Player
1	GK	ALB	Rezart Bunjaj
13	GK	ALB	Alevio Ndoj
29	DF	ALB	Irdi Zekaj
15	DF	GBR	Mergim Krasniqi
3	DF	ALB	Erigestino Pepnikaj
17	DF	ALB	Xhoel Hajdari
21	DF	ALB	Flori Spahiu
76	DF	GAM	Ousman tourey
22	MF	ALB	Ersi Zaganjori
8	MF	ALB	Enez papaj
—	MF	ALB	Ernest Hagrepi
—	MF	ALB	Gilam Agraja
—			
—			

No.	Pos.	Nation	Player
—			
—			
—			
—			
—			
—			
—			
—			
—			
—			
—			
—			
—			
