= Artan Jazxhi =

Albanian footballer (born 2001)

Personal information
- Full name: Artan Jazxhi
- Date of birth: 6 July 2001 (age 25)
- Place of birth: Durrës, Albania
- Height: 1.83 m (6 ft 0 in)
- Position: Centre-back

Team information
- Current team: Teuta
- Number: 4

Youth career
- 2013–2015: Durresi 04
- 2016–2018: Shkëndija Durrës
- 2018–: Teuta

Senior career*
Years	Team	Apps	(Gls)
2019–	Teuta	136	(8)
2025	→ Vllaznia (loan)	0	(0)

International career
2022–	Albania	0	(0)
- * Club domestic league appearances and goals as of 13 May 2026

Artan Jazxhi (born 6 July 2001) is an Albanian professional footballer who plays as a centre-back for Albanian club Teuta.
