= Dejvid Kapllani =

Albanian footballer (born 2001)

Personal information
- Date of birth: 3 June 2001 (age 25)
- Place of birth: Durrës, Albania
- Height: 1.85 m (6 ft 1 in)
- Position: Forward

Team information
- Current team: Avezzano

Youth career
- 2011–2019: Teuta

Senior career*
Years	Team	Apps	(Gls)
2019–2023	Teuta	36	(1)
2023	Erzeni	17	(1)
2023–2024	Fushë Kosova	7	(0)
2024	Kastrioti	16	(13)
2025-	Avezzano		
- * Club domestic league appearances and goals as of 4 Gen 2025

Dejvid Kapllani (born 3 June 2001) is an Albanian professional footballer who plays as a forward for Avezzano. His father Xhevahir was a goalkeeper who played for Teuta as well as the Albania national team. His uncle Edmond was a forward who spent the majority of his career in Germany and who also played for the Albania national team.

== Career statistics ==
=== Club ===
As of 20 April 2020

Club statistics
Club	Season	League			Cup		Europe (Note: Including continental competitions, such as UEFA Champions League and UEFA Europa League)		Other (Note: Including other competitions, such as Albanian Supercup)		Total	
Club	Season	Division	Apps	Goals	Apps	Goals	Apps	Goals	Apps	Goals	Apps	Goals
Teuta	2019–20	Albanian Superliga	6	0	3	1	—		—		9	1
Career total			6	0	3	1	—		—		9	1
