= Egnatia Arena =

Multi-purpose stadium in Rrogozhinë, Albania

- Arena Egnatia
- Demrozi Stadium
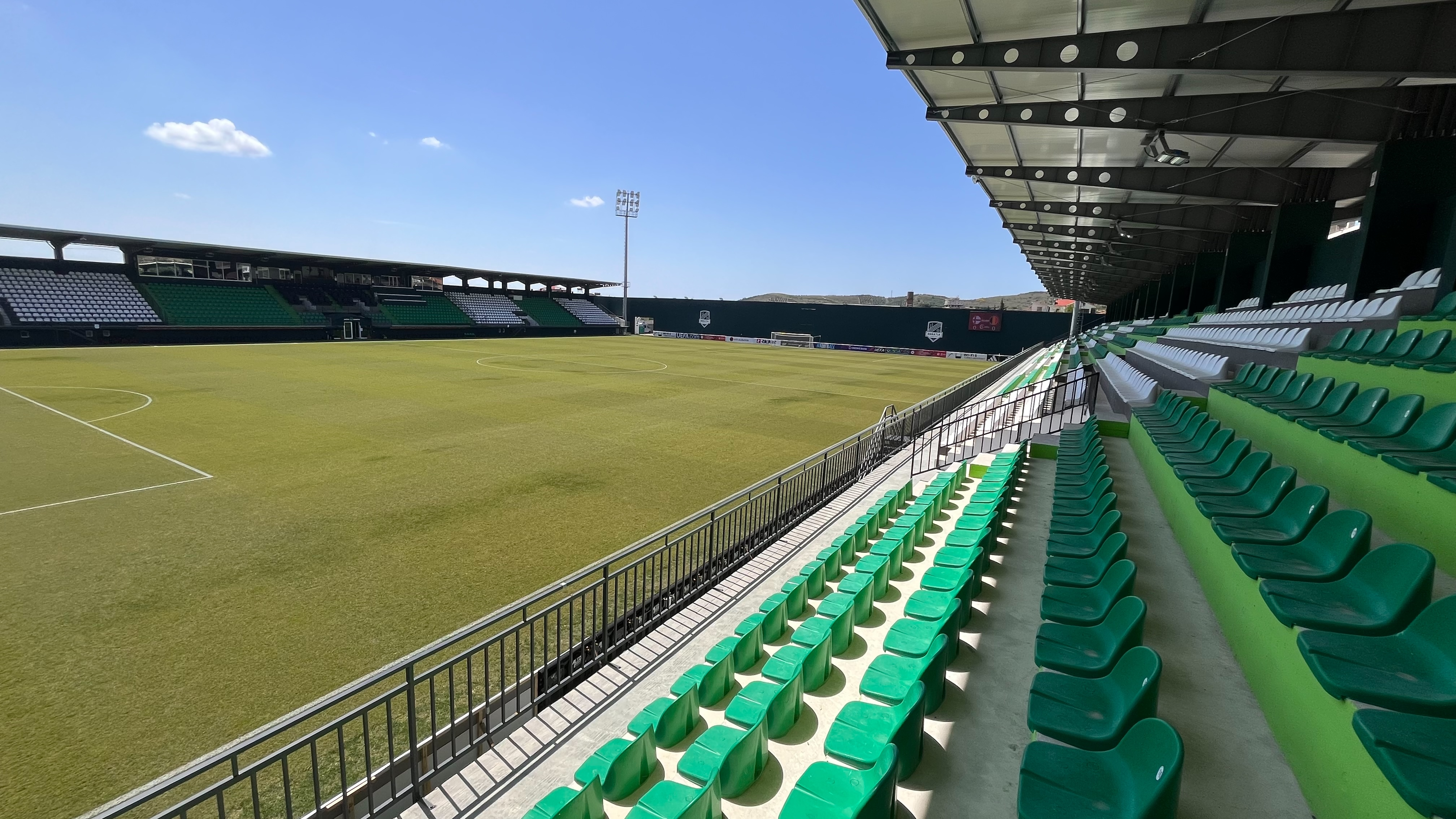
- Interactive map of Egnatia Arena
- Location: Rrogozhinë, Tirana County, Albania
- Coordinates: 41°04′36.5″N 19°39′41.9″E
- Owner: Municipality of Rrogozhinë
- Operator: Municipality of Rrogozhinë
- Capacity: 1,200
- Surface: Grass

Tenant
- Egnatia

Egnatia Arena (Albanian: Arena Egnatia) is a multi-purpose stadium in Rrogozhinë, Albania. It was previously known as the Hasan Zyla Stadium. It is used for football matches and is the home ground of Egnatia. Its capacity is 1200 spectators.

== History ==
The stadium has been used to host international matches for the Albania national under-19 football team and the Albania women's national under-19 football team.

Egnatia Arena underwent renovations in 2021 to rebuild it with a capacity of 2,400 seats in order to meet FIFA standards. The renovation was estimated to cost $2 million. During the start of the 2023–24 Kategoria Superiore, the pitch of the Egnatia Arena was resown and relaid. During this time KF Egnatia played their home games in Tirana but returned to the stadium in October 2023 after requesting permission from the Albanian Football Federation (AFF) to return ahead of schedule, which was approved. It subsequently hosted a 2024–25 UEFA Conference League qualifying between Egnatia and Víkingur Reykjavík from Iceland.

In 2023, Egnatia Arena was selected by the AFF as one of the host venues for the 2025 UEFA European Under-17 Championship. This selection was made, despite the stadium not meeting UEFA criteria at the time. As a result, the AFF invested in renovating the stadium. This included complete reconstruction of the stands as well as improvement in the stadium lighting. The newly-renovated stadium was subsequently inspected and approved by UEFA delegates in January 2025. Egnatia Arena was constructed to meet UEFA stadium category three. One of the new stands was named the "Rafael Duamena stand" after Raphael Dwamena, whom had died the previous year whilst playing for Egnatia.
