= Edi Baša =

Croatian footballer (born 1993)

Personal information
- Date of birth: 29 June 1993 (age 33)
- Place of birth: Pula, Croatia
- Height: 1.80 m (5 ft 11 in)
- Position: Forward

Team information
- Current team: Gjilani
- Number: 11

Youth career
- –2011: Istra 1961

Senior career*
Years	Team	Apps	(Gls)
2011–2013	Istra 1961		
2012–2013	→ Rovinj (loan)		
2013–2014	Jadran Poreč		
2014–2015	Željezničar	5	(0)
2015	Jadran Poreč		
2015–2017	Cibalia	63	(9)
2017–2018	Široki Brijeg	9	(0)
2018	Novigrad	13	(1)
2018–2020	Koper	19	(10)
2020	Asteras Vlachioti		
2021	Borec	11	(3)
2021–2023	Kukësi	67	(14)
2023–	Gjilani	102	(16)
- * Club domestic league appearances and goals as of 22 June 2026

Edi Baša (born 29 June 1993) is a Croatian footballer who plays as a forward for Kosovan club Gjilani.
