= Fabian Beqja =

Albanian footballer (born 1994)

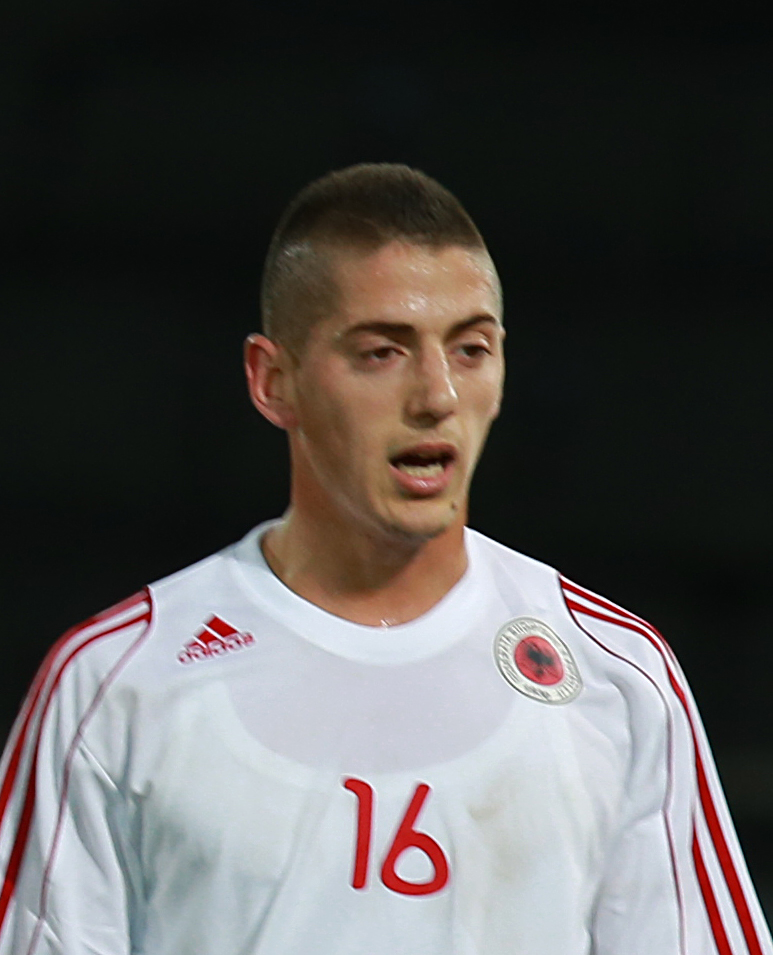

Personal information
- Date of birth: 15 February 1994 (age 32)
- Place of birth: Durrës, Albania
- Height: 1.76 m (5 ft 9 in)
- Position: Midfielder

Team information
- Current team: Flamurtari
- Number: 6

Youth career
- 2011–2013: Teuta

Senior career*
Years	Team	Apps	(Gls)
2013–2021	Teuta	116	(5)
2014–2015	→ Besa Kavajë (loan)	6	(0)
2021–2022	Gjilani	12	(0)
2023–	Flamurtari	35	(3)

International career
2014–2015	Albania U21	1	(0)
- * Club domestic league appearances and goals as of 1 June 2024

Fabian Beqja (born 15 February 1994) is an Albanian professional footballer who plays as a midfielder for Flamurtari.

== Club career ==
Beqja started his career at hometown club Teuta Durrës, where in 2011 he joined the under-19 side at the age of 17 and became a regular in the squad, scoring 2 goals in 21 games. The following season, he scored 15 goals in 27 games and which attracted the attention of the senior team who called him up at the start of the 2013–14 season.

He made it his debut at senior team on 23 October 2013 in the Albanian Cup against Besëlidhja Lezhë, as he included in the starting line up then getting substituted off in the 50th minute for Erjon Mustafaj and the match finished in the victory 1–2. First league debut came on 8 December 2013 against Flamurtari Vlorë as he came in as a substitute in the 58th minute in place of Da Silva Buiu and the match finished in the loss 2–0.

== International career ==
He made it his international debut, with the Albania U-21 on 5 March 2014 against Austria U-21 as he came in as a substitute in the 63rd minute in place of Gjelbrim Taipi, the match finished in the away victory 1–3.
