= 2020 Albanian Supercup =

Tirana	Teuta
1	2
- Date: 31 August 2020
- Venue: Elbasan Arena, Elbasan
- Referee: Enea Jorgji
- Attendance: 0 (Note: The match was played behind closed doors due to the COVID-19 pandemic in Albania.)

The 2020 Albanian Supercup was the 27th edition of the Albanian Supercup, an annual Albanian football match. The teams were decided by taking the previous season's Kategoria Superiore champions and the winners of the Albanian Cup.

The match was contested by Tirana, champions of the 2019–20 Kategoria Superiore, and Teuta, the 2019–20 Albanian Cup winners.

== Details ==
31 August 2020
20:00 CEST

Tirana	1–2	Teuta
Vrapi 75'		Hebaj 21', 33'

Elbasan Arena, Elbasan
Attendance: 0
Referee: (Albania) Enea Jorgji

Match officials:
Assistant referees:
(Albania) Denis Rexha
(Albania) Rejdi Avdo
Additional AR:
(Albania) Eldorjan Hamiti
(Albania) Juxhin Xhaja
Fourth official:
(Albania) Dojando Myftari

Match rules

- 90 minutes
- 30 minutes extra-time if the scores still level
- Penalty shoot-out if scores still level
- Six named substitutes, of which three may be used and additional fourth if extra-time is played

== See also ==
- 2019–20 Kategoria Superiore
- 2019–20 Albanian Cup
