= 2021–22 Kategoria Superiore =

Kategoria Superiore
- Season: 2021–22
- Dates: 10 September 2021 – 26 May 2022
- Champions: Tirana; 26th title
- Relegated: Dinamo Tirana; Skënderbeu
- Champions League: Tirana
- Europa Conference League: Laçi; Partizani; Vllaznia
- Matches: 180
- Goals: 408 (2.27 per match)
- Top goalscorer: Saliou Guindo; Taulant Seferi (19 goals each)
- Biggest home win: Laçi 5–0 Dinamo (3 December 2021); Partizani 5–0 Kukësi (2 March 2022)
- Biggest away win: Kastrioti 1–6 Kukësi (4 December 2021)
- Highest scoring: Vllaznia 6–3 Dinamo (18 October 2021)
- Longest winning run: 7 matches Kastrioti
- Longest unbeaten run: 11 matches Laçi; Vllaznia
- Longest winless run: 17 matches Skënderbeu
- Longest losing run: 7 matches Dinamo
- All statistics correct as of 26 May 2022.

The 2021–22 Kategoria Superiore was the 83rd official season, or 86th season of top-tier football in Albania (including three unofficial championships during World War II) and the 22nd season under the name Kategoria Superiore. The season began in 10 September 2021 and ended on 26 May 2022. Tirana won the league title on 7 May 2022, with 3 matches to spare.

The winners of this season's Kategoria Superiore earned a place in the first qualifying round of the 2022–23 Champions League, with the second and third placed clubs earning a place in the first qualifying round of the 2022–23 Europa Conference League.

== Teams ==
Two clubs have earned promotion from the Kategoria e Parë, Dinamo Tirana (promoted after a nine-year absence) and Egnatia (promoted after a sixteen-year absence). Apolonia (relegated after only one year in the top flight) and Bylis (relegated after two-years in the top flight) were relegated to Kategoria e Parë at the conclusion of last season.

=== Locations ===
2021–22 Kategoria Superiore teams.

Team	Home city	Stadium	Capacity	2020–21 season
Dinamo Tirana	Tirana	Arena Kombëtare	22,500	Runner-up (Kategoria e Parë)
Egnatia	Rrogozhinë	Arena Egnatia	4,000	Champion (Kategoria e Parë)
Kastrioti	Krujë	Kamëz Stadium	5,500	8th
Kukësi	Kukës	Kukës Arena	6,322	6th
Laçi	Laç	Laçi Stadium	2,300	4th
Partizani	Tirana	Arena Kombëtare	22,500	3rd
Skënderbeu	Korçë	Skënderbeu Stadium	12,343	7th
Teuta	Durrës	Niko Dovana Stadium	12,040	Champion
Tirana	Tirana	Selman Stërmasi Stadium	9,500	5th
Vllaznia	Shkodër	Loro Boriçi Stadium	16,000	2nd

=== Stadiums ===
Dinamo Tirana	Egnatia	Kastrioti	Kukësi	Laçi
Arena Kombëtare; UEFA stadium category	Arena Egnatia	Kamëz Stadium	Kukës Arena; UEFA stadium category	Laçi Stadium
Capacity: 22,500	Capacity: 4,000	Capacity: 5,500	Capacity: 6,322	Capacity: 2,300
Partizani	Skënderbeu	Teuta	Tirana	Vllaznia
Arena Kombëtare; UEFA stadium category	Skënderbeu Stadium	Niko Dovana Stadium	Selman Stërmasi Stadium	Loro Boriçi Stadium; UEFA stadium category
Capacity: 22,500	Capacity: 12,343	Capacity: 12,040	Capacity: 9,500	Capacity: 16,000

=== Personnel and kits ===
Note: Flags indicate national team as has been defined under FIFA eligibility rules. Players and Managers may hold more than one non-FIFA nationality.

Team	President	Manager	Captain	Kit manufacturer	Shirt sponsor
Dinamo Tirana	(Albania) Ardian Bardhi	(Italy) Rodolfo Vanoli	(North Macedonia) Agim Ibraimi	Claw	Caffè Pascucci, Palma
Egnatia	(Albania) Agim Demrozi	(North Macedonia) Zekirija Ramadani	(Albania) Gëzim Krasniqi	Uhlsport	−
Kastrioti	(Albania) Petro Kumi	(Albania) Emiliano Çela	(Albania) Sokol Neziri	Uhlsport	Qafshtama
Kukësi	(Albania) Safet Gjici	(Italy) Diego Longo	(Kosovo) Gjelbrim Taipi	Joma	Kevin Construction
Laçi	(Albania) Pashk Laska	(Albania) Shpëtim Duro	(Serbia) Aleksandar Ignjatović	Uhlsport	Caffè Vergnano
Partizani	(Albania) Gazmend Demi	(Albania) Dritan Mehmeti	(Albania) Alban Hoxha	Joma	Emi Trans
Skënderbeu	(Albania) Ardian Takaj	(Albania) Gentian Liçi	(Albania) Vangjel Zguro	Joma	−
Teuta	(Albania) Edmond Hasanbelliu	(Albania) Renato Arapi	(Albania) Emiljano Vila	Macron	Kastrati, Selita
Tirana	(Albania) Refik Halili	(Albania) Orges Shehi	(Albania) Erion Hoxhallari	Uhlsport	−
Vllaznia	(Albania) Alban Xhaferi	(Albania) Mirel Josa	(Albania) Erdenis Gurishta	Suzmar	Bavaria, Intersig

=== Managerial changes ===
Team	Outgoing manager	Manner of departure	Date of vacancy	Position in table	Incoming manager	Date of appointment
Kukësi	(Albania) Mirel Josa	Mutual consent	6 June 2021	Pre-season	(Italy) Diego Longo	16 July 2021
Laçi	(Albania) Shpëtim Duro	Mutual consent	16 August 2021	Pre-season	(Montenegro) Dejan Vukićević	17 August 2021
Laçi	(Montenegro) Dejan Vukićević	Mutual consent	16 October 2021	10th	(Albania) Sero Noka	19 October 2021
Laçi	(Albania) Sero Noka	End of caretaker spell	24 October 2021	7th	(Albania) Mirel Josa	24 October 2021
Teuta	(Albania) Edi Martini	Resigned	26 November 2021	3rd	(Albania) Renato Arapi	26 November 2021
Egnatia	(Albania) Gugash Magani	Sacked	29 November 2021	8th	(Albania) Përparim Daiu	29 November 2021
Egnatia	(Albania) Përparim Daiu	End of caretaker spell	6 December 2021	8th	(North Macedonia) Zekirija Ramadani	6 December 2021
Teuta	(Albania) Renato Arapi	End of caretaker spell	14 December 2021	5th	(Albania) Edi Martini	14 December 2021
Kastrioti	(Albania) Ramadan Ndreu	Mutual consent	23 December 2021	10th	(Albania) Emiliano Çela	23 December 2021
Partizani	(Albania) Ilir Daja	Mutual consent	28 December 2021	6th	(Albania) Dritan Mehmeti	28 December 2021
Teuta	(Albania) Edi Martini	Mutual consent	24 January 2022	6th	(Albania) Renato Arapi	24 January 2022
Dinamo Tirana	(Albania) Bledi Shkëmbi	Mutual consent	7 February 2022	7th	(Albania) Bledar Devolli	7 February 2022
Skënderbeu	(Albania) Migen Memelli	Mutual consent	9 March 2022	10th	(Albania) Skënder Gega	9 March 2022
Vllaznia	(Germany) Thomas Brdarić	Sacked	14 March 2022	4th	(Albania) Elvis Plori	14 March 2022
Dinamo Tirana	(Albania) Bledar Devolli	Mutual consent	14 March 2022	9th	(Italy) Rodolfo Vanoli	16 March 2022
Laçi	(Albania) Mirel Josa	Sacked	5 April 2022	2nd	(Albania) Shpëtim Duro	7 April 2022
Skënderbeu	(Albania) Skënder Gega	Resigned	12 May 2022	10th	(Albania) Gentian Liçi	12 May 2022
Vllaznia	(Albania) Elvis Plori	Mutual consent	15 May 2022	5th	(Albania) Mirel Josa	15 May 2022

== League table ==
Pos	Team	Pld	W	D	L	GF	GA	GD	Pts	Qualification or relegation
1	Tirana (C)	36	22	7	7	64	27	+37	73	Qualification for the Champions League first qualifying round
2	Laçi	36	18	9	9	52	33	+19	63	Qualification for the Europa Conference League first qualifying round
3	Partizani	36	15	13	8	52	30	+22	58	Qualification for the Europa Conference League first qualifying round
4	Kukësi	36	15	10	11	50	44	+6	55 (Note: Kukësi is ahead of Vllaznia on head-to-head goal difference: Kukësi 4, Vllaznia 3)	
5	Vllaznia	36	13	16	7	47	38	+9	55	Qualification for the Europa Conference League second qualifying round (Note: Vllaznia qualified for the Europa Conference League second qualifying round as the 2021–22 Albanian Cup winners.)
6	Teuta	36	13	11	12	39	44	−5	50	
7	Kastrioti	36	13	4	19	30	54	−24	43	
8	Egnatia (O)	36	8	11	17	30	49	−19	35	Qualification for the relegation play-off
9	Dinamo Tirana (R)	36	6	11	19	21	46	−25	29	Relegation to the 2022–23 Kategoria e Parë
10	Skënderbeu (R)	36	4	14	18	23	43	−20	26	Relegation to the 2022–23 Kategoria e Parë

Source: Albanian Football Association, Soccerway
Rules for classification: 1) Points; 2) Head-to-head points; 3) Head-to-head goal difference; 4) Head-to-head goals scored; 5) Goal difference; 6) Goals scored; 7) Draw.
(C) Champions; (O) Play-off winners; (R) Relegated

== Results ==
Clubs will play each other four times for a total of 36 matches each.

=== First half of season ===
Home \ Away	DIN	EGN	KAS	KUK	LAÇ	PAR	SKË	TEU	TIR	VLL
Dinamo	—	1–1	1–0	0–1	1–1	1–1	0–0	0–1	0–1	0–0
Egnatia	1–1	—	2–1	1–3	0–2	0–3	1–1	0–1	0–2	1–1
Kastrioti	0–2	1–0	—	1–6	0–1	0–2	2–0	2–0	1–1	0–1
Kukësi	0–1	2–0	3–1	—	1–2	2–1	1–0	2–3	2–1	2–0
Laçi	5–0	0–1	2–0	2–2	—	1–0	2–0	2–0	1–0	3–5
Partizani	1–0	1–1	0–0	1–1	1–1	—	2–1	2–1	1–2	1–1
Skënderbeu	0–1	2–0	2–1	2–1	0–0	1–1	—	0–1	0–0	0–0
Teuta	0–0	1–2	1–1	0–0	2–4	1–0	2–2	—	2–3	1–1
Tirana	4–0	1–1	3–0	4–0	2–0	1–0	4–2	2–1	—	0–0
Vllaznia	6–3	1–1	3–1	1–1	1–0	1–0	2–0	1–1	0–2	—

Source: Albanian Football Association
Legend: Blue = home team win; Yellow = draw; Red = away team win.

=== Second half of season ===
Home \ Away	DIN	EGN	KAS	KUK	LAÇ	PAR	SKË	TEU	TIR	VLL
Dinamo	—	0–2	0–1	0–2	0–1	0–0	1–1	0–1	2–1	0–0
Egnatia	1–1	—	2–1	0–2	0–2	0–1	2–0	0–1	0–3	3–0
Kastrioti	2–0	2–1	—	1–0	1–1	1–0	1–0	0–1	2–1	1–3
Kukësi	2–1	1–1	4–0	—	0–0	1–2	1–0	1–1	0–0	0–0
Laçi	2–1	0–0	4–1	3–0	—	3–4	0–0	0–1	1–0	1–0
Partizani	3–1	2–2	4–0	5–0	2–1	—	0–0	3–1	1–2	1–1
Skënderbeu	0–1	0–1	2–0	1–1	1–2	1–2	—	0–0	0–4	2–2
Teuta	1–0	3–1	0–1	4–1	2–1	0–4	0–0	—	0–2	1–1
Tirana	1–0	2–0	0–1	2–3	4–1	0–0	3–2	1–1	—	3–1
Vllaznia	2–1	3–1	1–2	2–1	0–0	0–0	1–0	4–2	1–2	—

Source: Albanian Football Association
Legend: Blue = home team win; Yellow = draw; Red = away team win.
For upcoming matches, an "a" indicates there is an article about the rivalry between the two participants.

=== Positions by round ===
The table lists the positions of teams after each week of matches.

Team ╲ Round	1	2	3	4	5	6	7	8	9	10	11	12	13	14	15	16	17	18	19	20	21	22	23	24	25	26	27	28	29	30	31	32	33	34	35	36
Dinamo	4	4	4	5	6	5	5	7	7	5	7	7	7	7	7	7	7	7	7	7	8	8	9	8	9	9	9	9	9	9	9	9	9	9	9	9
Egnatia	9	9	9	6	5	6	6	6	6	8	8	9	9	9	9	9	9	9	9	9	7	7	7	7	8	8	8	8	8	8	8	8	8	8	8	8
Kastrioti	10	10	10	10	8	9	9	10	10	10	10	10	10	10	10	10	10	10	10	10	9	9	8	9	7	7	7	6	6	6	6	6	6	7	7	7
Kukësi	3	1	1	3	4	3	2	2	2	2	2	2	2	2	2	3	3	3	3	3	3	3	3	3	3	3	3	3	3	3	4	4	5	4	4	4
Laçi	7	7	7	9	10	7	7	4	5	6	4	4	4	4	3	2	2	2	2	2	2	2	2	2	2	2	2	2	2	2	2	2	2	2	2	2
Partizani	6	6	6	7	7	8	8	8	8	7	5	6	6	6	6	5	5	5	5	5	5	5	5	5	5	5	5	4	4	4	3	3	4	3	3	3
Skënderbeu	8	8	8	8	9	10	10	9	9	9	9	8	8	8	8	8	8	8	8	8	10	10	10	10	10	10	10	10	10	10	10	10	10	10	10	10
Teuta	5	5	5	2	3	2	3	3	3	4	6	5	5	5	5	6	6	6	6	6	6	6	6	6	6	6	6	7	7	7	7	7	7	6	6	6
Tirana	2	3	3	1	1	1	1	1	1	1	1	1	1	1	1	1	1	1	1	1	1	1	1	1	1	1	1	1	1	1	1	1	1	1	1	1
Vllaznia	1	2	2	4	2	4	4	5	4	3	3	3	3	3	4	4	4	4	4	4	4	4	4	4	4	4	4	5	5	5	5	5	3	5	5	5

Leader and UEFA Champions League first qualifying round
UEFA Europa Conference League first qualifying round
Relegation play-off
2022–23 Kategoria e Parë

=== Relegation play-off ===
31 May 2022
17:00

Egnatia	2−0	Korabi
Delarge 16'; Jackson 81' (pen.)

Arena Egnatia, Rrogozhinë
Referee: Eldorjan Hamiti

Both clubs remained in their respective leagues.

== Season statistics ==
=== Scoring ===
==== Top scorers ====
Rank	Player	Club	Goals
1	(Mali) Saliou Guindo	Laçi	19
1	(Albania) Taulant Seferi	Tirana	19
3	(Albania) Redon Xhixha	Tirana	14
4	(Albania) Liridon Latifi	Vllaznia	12
4	(Brazil) Stênio Júnior	Partizani	12
6	(Croatia) Ante Aralica	Vllaznia	10
6	(Croatia) Edi Baša	Kukësi	10
6	(Brazil) Pedro	Egnatia	10
6	(Albania) Rubin Hebaj	Teuta	10
6	(Albania) Tedi Cara	Partizani	10
6	(Albania) Xhuliano Skuka	Dinamo/Partizani	10

=== Discipline ===
==== Player ====
- Most yellow cards: 14
  - (Albania) Erdenis Gurishta (Vllaznia)
  - (North Macedonia) Goran Siljanovski (Dinamo Tirana)
- Most red cards: 2
  - (Albania) Albion Marku (Partizani)
  - (Albania) Asion Daja (Teuta)
  - (Albania) Bekim Dida (Kastrioti)
  - (North Macedonia) Mevlan Adili (Vllaznia)
  - (Albania) Vangjel Zguro (Skënderbeu)

== Awards ==
=== Annual awards ===
Award	Winner	Club
Manager of the Season	(Albania) Orges Shehi	Tirana
Player of the Season	(Albania) Redon Xhixha	Tirana
Young Player of the Season	(Albania) Simon Simoni	Dinamo Tirana

Team of the Year
Goalkeeper	(Kosovo) Visar Bekaj (Tirana)			
Defenders	(Albania) Erdenis Gurishta (Vllaznia)	(Albania) Eneo Bitri (Partizani)	(North Macedonia) Filip Najdovski (Tirana)	(Albania) Esin Hakaj (Vllaznia)
Midfielders	(Albania) Arinaldo Rrapaj (Partizani)		(Republic of the Congo) Chandrel Massanga (Partizani)	(Kosovo) Mentor Mazrekaj (Laçi)
Forwards	(Albania) Taulant Seferi (Tirana)		(Albania) Xhuliano Skuka (Dinamo/Partizani)	(Albania) Redon Xhixha (Tirana)

== See also ==
- Kategoria Superiore

== Notes and references ==
=== Notes ===
1. Kastrioti plays their 2021–22 home games at the Kamëz Stadium in Kamëz, since their venue, Kastrioti Stadium, is not suitable for Kategoria Superiore matches.
