= Elbasan Arena =

Multi-purpose stadium in Elbasan, Albania

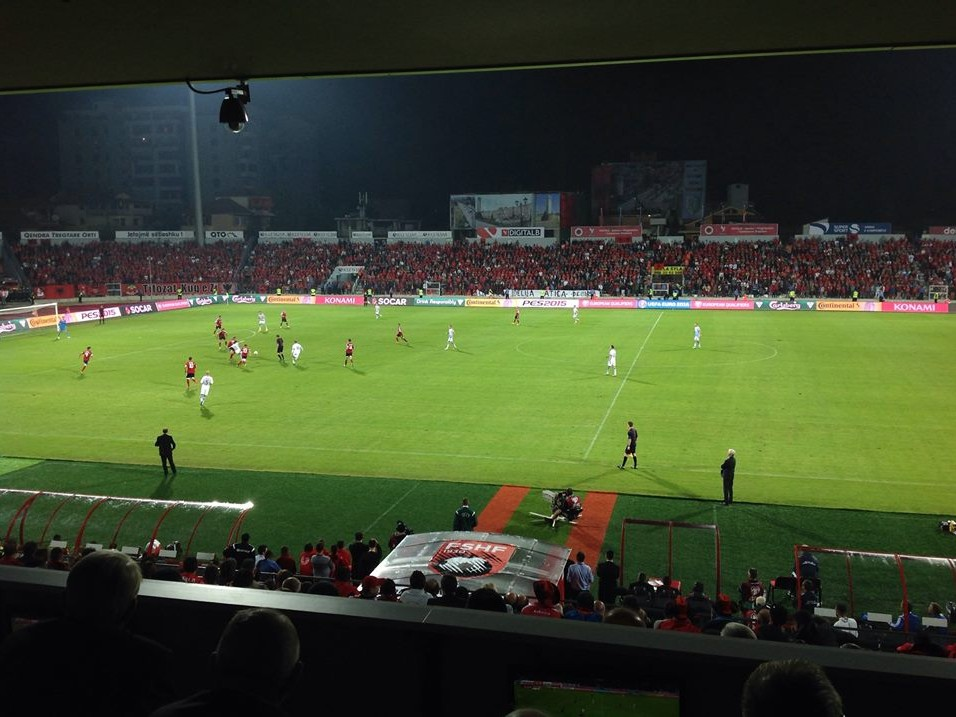
- UEFA
- Interactive map of Elbasan Arena
- Location: Sheshi Ruzhdi Bizhuta 1, 3001 Elbasan, Albania
- Coordinates: 41°06′57.15″N 20°05′31.17″E
- Operator: FSHF
- Capacity: 12,640
- Surface: Grass
- Record attendance: 12.800 Albania vs. Denmark (11/10/2014, Euro 2016)
- Field size: 105 m × 68 m (344 ft × 223 ft)

Construction
- Opened: 1967
- Renovated: 2001, 2014

Tenant
- AF Elbasani

Elbasan Arena (Albanian: Elbasan Arena, formerly known as Ruzhdi Bizhuta) is a multi-purpose stadium in Elbasan, Albania. The stadium was completed in 1967 and it is home ground of AF Elbasani. The stadium was under reconstruction and was officially inaugurated on 8 October 2014 in time for the match against Denmark, valid for the qualifiers of UEFA Euro 2016, with total capacity of 12,800, making it the 3rd largest in Albania, after the Air Albania Stadium in Tirana and Loro Boriçi Stadium in Shkodër.

== History ==
Elbasan Arena first opened in 1967 under the name of Ruzhdi Bizhuta Stadion who was one of KF Elbasani’s most famous players. Constructed in the 1960s, the ground was built to replace the club’s former ground which had slowly become a set of outdated facilities.

For the majority of Ruzhdi Bizhuta’s history, the stadium has been used exclusively by KF Elbasani but in January 2014 it was announced that the ground would host Albania’s qualification matches of Euro 2016. This decision was taken by the Albanian Football Association in order to allow the usual national stadium Qemal Stafa to undergo extensive renovation work.

=== 2014 reconstruction ===
Before Elbasan Arena could host the matches however it would have to undergo refurbishment itself, and in total over €5.5 million invested into the stadium. Work to bring up the stadium to UEFA’s required standards began in February 2014, and finished 7 months later in October.

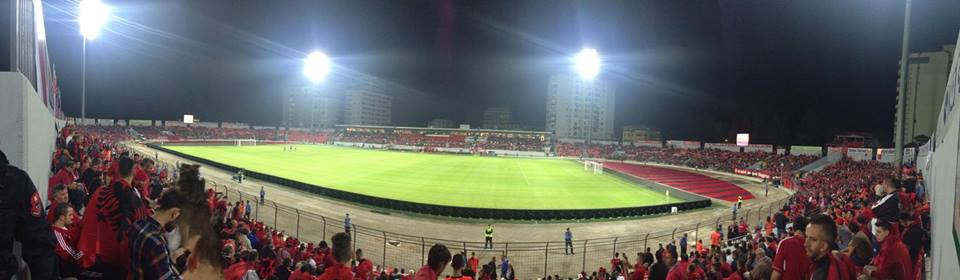
Cheering at Elbasan Arena

Numerous improvements were made to the stadium including the installation of new floodlights, 12,500 new plastic seats, new changing rooms, executive seating areas, new scoreboards, and the laying of a new playing surface.

=== Inauguration ===
The opening ceremony of the stadium was held on 8 October 2014, with an exhibition match between the national football team against the U-19 team of Futboll Klub Elbasani. This was in preparation for a historical match against Denmark on 11 October. Playing at the recently refurbished Elbasan Arena, the hosts grabbed a 38th-minute lead through Ermir Lenjani's deflected strike but Denmark substitute Lasse Vibe slotted home an 81st-minute equaliser as the Group I rivals went joint-top.

11 October 2014
20:45 UTC

Albania	1–1	Denmark
Ermir Lenjani 38'		Lasse Vibe 81'

Elbasan Arena, Elbasan
Attendance: 12,800
Referee: Viktor Kassai

Albania (4–3–3):
GK	1	Etrit Berisha
RB	4	Elseid Hysaj
CB	5	Lorik Cana
CB	15	Mërgim Mavraj
LB	7	Ansi Agolli
DM	13	Burim Kukeli
CM	22	Amir Abrashi
CM	14	Taulant Xhaka (substituted off) 82'
RW	2	Andi Lila (substituted off) 87'
LW	3	Ermir Lenjani
CF	19	Bekim Balaj (substituted off) 69'
Substitutions:
GK	12	Orges Shehi
GK	23	Alban Hoxha
CB	6	Debatik Curri	(substituted on) 87'
RW	8	Herolind Shala
FW	9	Edmond Kapllani
LM	10	Valdet Rama	(substituted on) 82'
RM	11	Emiljano Vila
FW	16	Sokol Cikalleshi	(substituted on) 69'
CM	17	Alban Meha
FW	18	Hamdi Salihi
CM	20	Ergys Kaçe
MF	21	Armando Vajushi
Manager:
Gianni De Biasi

Denmark (4–3–3):
GK	1	Kasper Schmeichel
RB	2	Peter Ankersen
CB	3	Simon Kjær
CB	5	Andreas Bjelland
LB	7	Nicolai Boilesen
RM	9	Pierre-Emile Højbjerg
CM	10	William Kvist
LM	11	Christian Eriksen
RW	12	Yussuf Poulsen
LW	19	Michael Krohn-Dehli
CF	23	Nicklas Bendtner
Manager:
Morten Olsen
