= 2021 Albanian Supercup =

Teuta	Vllaznia
3	0
- Date: 28 August 2021
- Venue: Elbasan Arena, Elbasan
- Referee: Kridens Meta

The 2021 Albanian Supercup was the 28th edition of the Albanian Supercup, an annual Albanian football match. The teams were decided by taking the previous season's Kategoria Superiore champions and the winners of the Albanian Cup.

The match was contested by Teuta, champions of the 2020–21 Kategoria Superiore, and Vllaznia, the 2020–21 Albanian Cup winners.

== Details ==
28 August 2021
19:00 CEST

Teuta	3−0	Vllaznia
Aleksi 57'; Gruda 63'; Plaku 90+3'

Elbasan Arena, Elbasan
Referee: (Albania) Kridens Meta

Match officials:
Assistant referees:
(Albania) Dojando Myftari
(Albania) Rejdi Avdo
Fourth official:
(Albania) Juxhin Xhaja
Video Assistant Referee:
(Albania) Enea Jorgji
Assistant video assistant referee:
(Albania) Denis Rexha

Match rules

- 90 minutes
- 30 minutes extra-time if the scores still level
- Penalty shoot-out if scores still level
- Six named substitutes, of which three may be used and additional fourth if extra-time is played

== See also ==
- 2020–21 Kategoria Superiore
- 2020–21 Albanian Cup
