= 2018–19 FC Drita season =

Drita
2018–19 season
- Chairman: Valon Murseli
- Head coach: Bekim Isufi (until 13 September 2018); Shpëtim Duro (from 17 September 2018); Ardian Nuhiu (from 13 February 2018)
- Stadium: Gjilan City Stadium
- Football Superleague of Kosovo: 4th
- Kosovar Cup: Quarterfinal
- Kosovar Supercup: Winners
- UEFA Champions League: First qualifying round
- UEFA Europa League: Second qualifying round
- Top goalscorer: League: All: Betim Haxhimusa; Endrit Krasniqi (2 goals each)
- Biggest win: Drita 6-1 KF Ballkani
- Biggest defeat: Feronikeli 4-0 Drita
Home colours	Away colours	Third colours
- All statistics correct as of 19 August 2018.

The 2018–19 FC Drita season was the 19th consecutive edition of Football Club Drita in the topflight of Kosovar football, and contested in Football Superleague of Kosovo and Kosovar Cup.

== Season overview ==
=== June ===
On 19 June, before leaving for Gibraltar Drita transferred footballer Betim Haxhimusa from their local rivals.

On 6 June Drita transferred Albanian goalkeeper Edvan Bakaj from KF Liria. Bakaj has signed a one-year contract with the club.

=== July ===
On 3 July after returning from the state of Gjilbardari and winning victories there in the Pre-Eliminary Round in the UEFA Champions League, FC Drita transferred the other player from his local rivals SC Gjilani, midfielder Zgjim Mustafa.

On 21 July was presented the offensive midfielder at Drita Eri Lamçja, was more active to KF Luftetari

=== August ===
On 3 August transferred Edenilson Bergonsi Bergonsi is not unheard of for the supporters as he was part of the Drita for the half-season at the end of 2016. "Edenilson Bergonsi is the next transfer for the 2018/2019 season. Bergonsi has signed a one-year contract with our team and Monday is expected to start drills with the group." said a club official!

On 6 August champions in power have formalized the deal with Filonit Shaqiri, who was the third player to come from rivals in the same city.

On 17 August Football Federation of Kosovo has sentenced FC Drita to 10,000 euros and 2 games without a spectators, with the reason that the supporters of FC Drita had wrong behavior by throwing fireworks on the field that significantly contaminated the air and hampered the course of the match and used offensive expression to the team and the opposing supporters

On 18 August although the transfer deadline for the transfer of players has been completed, FC Drita has presented the latest lead, defender Ervis Kaja. The player was recently part of KF Liria from Prizren, as he previously made his career in KF Tirana, KF Laçi, KF Besa.

=== September ===
On 13 September after Drita loss against KF Llapi, Bekim Isufi resigned from the position of the coach! Under the direction of Bekim Isufi, Drita was the champion of the Kosovo Super League, as well as won the Super Cup of Kosovo.

On 15 September Fisnik Kerçeli resigned from the position of the Sports director of the team. In the message to the Drita's supporters he said: "I can not remain indifferent to the situation that we are in. Recently, with the arrival of some unprofessional people, I think the situation got out of control!"

On 17 September Drita FC has signed a 1-year agreement with the coach from Albania, Shpëtim Duro. Duro in the past has coached Albanian clubs such as KF Partizani from Tirana, KF Flamurtari Vlorë from Vlora, KF Vllaznia from Shkodra, KF Skenderbeu from Korça and KF Shkëndija from Tetovo. This was the first time that Duro lead a team in Kosovo.

On 17 September The club of Gjilan has formalized Ardian Nuhiu as assistant of Shpëtim Duro, who was presented on the same day to The Intellectuals. Nuhiu has signed the two-year contract.

=== December ===
On 20 December, Drita was awarded as the best team of the year, Xhevdet Shabani was awarded as the best player of the year and the coach Bekim Isufi was awarded as the best coach of the year. Betim Haxhimusa and Kastriot Rexha have awarded for the best Superliga scorers with 13 goals each. Whereas for the best formation of the year are selected 3 players of Drita: Xhevdet Shabani, Kastriot Rexha and Endrit Krasniqi.

=== January ===
On 2 January, Drita has held talks with Albania's National Team Player, Jahmir Hyka, by signing a contract for four months with a salary of 10,000 euros for month. But Hyka has rejected this offer due to the poor quality of Kosovo's Super League.

On 6 January, Drita announced the transfer of Arbër Shala loan to FC Kamza. He will stay at this club until the end of the season.

On 10 January, the defender Perparim Osmani was loaned for six months from Prishtina to the Drita.

On 10 January, Drita has reached agreement with midfielder Endrit Krasniqi to continue co-operation for another year. Krasniqi's contract signed before international matches expired in January 2019.

On 16 January, Drita has announced that has unilaterally terminated the contract with the defender from Albania, Ervis Kaja. Kaja, as the club from Gjilan has announced, has not responded to the invitation to start the preparatory phase for the Superliga spring season.

On 21 January, Drita has announced the break-out of cooperation with the Edvan Bakaj the goalkeeper from Tirana.

On 22 January, Viktor Kuka was loaned to KF Ferizaj for 6 month.

On 24 January, Has presented 5 players: Denis Haliti, left defender, who is called back from loan. Festim Krasniqi is another player who will strengthen the wing of the attack. Klajdi Burba a classic forward, and after Edvan Bakaj leave the team Drita has transferred Mario Kirev a goalkeeper from Kamza

=== February ===
On 11 February, Ardian Nuhiu was named the new coach of FC Drita

== Support ==
After the victories in Gibraltar, Drita played the first qualifying match in Mitrovica, as the Gjilan City Stadium did not meet the conditions of UEFA. So "Intellectuals" traveled 30 buses from Gjilan to Mitrovica, where about 10,000 supporters were present. Intellectuals unfold a giant choreographer with the message "A road paved with sacrifice 1990 - 2018", this message was devoted to all Kosovar footballers who sacrificed everything for Kosovo football - While in the return match, around 100 "intellectuals" in Malmö, Sweden, where there unfolded a giant flag of Albania.

After losing from Malmö, Drita played against F91 Dudelange from Luxembourg. About 50 intellectuals were present in Luxembourg, while in the second game that took place in Mitrovica there were about 3,000 intellectuals.

In the SuperCup game between Drita and Prishtina, they traveled around 10 bus with intellectuals. In this game intellectuals threw pyrotechnics in the field, where 3 days after the match the Football Federation of Kosovo sentenced them with 2 games without supporters.

== Squad information ==
As of 31 January 2019

Note: Flags indicate national team as defined under FIFA eligibility rules; some limited exceptions apply. Players may hold more than one non-FIFA nationality.

No.	Pos.	Nation	Player
1	GK	KOS	Leutrim Rexhepi
2	DF	KOS	Premton Isufi
4	DF	KOS	Fidan Gërbeshi (vice-captain)
5	DF	KOS	Ardian Limani (captain)
6	DF	MKD	Sedat Berisha
7	MF	KOS	Endrit Krasniqi
8	DF	KOS	Përparim Osmani (on loan from Prishtina)
9	FW	NGA	Kyrian Nwabueze
10	MF	KOS	Xhevdet Shabani
11	MF	KOS	Përparim Livoreka
13	DF	KOS	Liridon Leci
14	MF	KOS	Fillonit Shaqiri

No.	Pos.	Nation	Player
16	MF	KOS	Albin Krasniqi
20	MF	ALB	Erjon Vucaj
21	DF	KOS	Denis Haliti
22	FW	KOS	Betim Haxhimusa
25	MF	KOS	Bujar Shabani
30	GK	BUL	Mario Kirev
42	MF	ALB	Klajdi Burba
45	FW	KOS	Festim Krasniqi
74	MF	KOS	Zgjim Mustafa
93	MF	ALB	Haxhi Neziraj
94	DF	KOS	Adonis Ruhani

== Transfers ==
=== Summer ===
As of 18 August 2018

In: Note: Flags indicate national team as defined under FIFA eligibility rules; some limited exceptions apply. Players may hold more than one non-FIFA nationality.

No.	Pos.	Nation	Player
8	MF	BRA	Edenilson (from (Cyprus) Enosis Neon Paralimni)
9	FW	BRA	Ricardo Verza (on loan from (Brazil) Goiás)
14	MF	KOS	Fillonit Shaqiri (from Gjilani)
16	MF	KOS	Albin Krasniqi (from Ferizaj)
20	MF	ALB	Erjon Vucaj (from (Albania) Vllaznia Shkodër)
22	FW	KOS	Betim Haxhimusa (from Gjilani)
23	DF	KOS	Arbër Shala (from (Albania) Laçi)
27	FW	ALB	Eri Lamçja (from (Albania) Luftëtari Gjirokastër)
29	DF	ALB	Ervis Kaja (from Liria)
31	GK	ALB	Edvan Bakaj (from Liria)
74	MF	KOS	Zgjim Mustafa (from Gjilani)

Out: Note: Flags indicate national team as defined under FIFA eligibility rules; some limited exceptions apply. Players may hold more than one non-FIFA nationality.

No.	Pos.	Nation	Player
7	MF	KOS	Astrit Fazliu (to Feronikeli)
9	FW	KOS	Leotrim Kryeziu (to (Switzerland) Lugano)
30	GK	KOS	Betim Halimi (to (Estonia) Narva Trans)
99	GK	KOS	Dorart Ramadani (to Dardana)
—	MF	KOS	Alban Rexhepi (to Llapi)
—	MF	KOS	Edison Kqiku (to Gjilani)
—	FW	KOS	Ylli Bislimi (to 2 Korriku)

=== Winter ===
As of 2 February 2019

In: Note: Flags indicate national team as defined under FIFA eligibility rules; some limited exceptions apply. Players may hold more than one non-FIFA nationality.

No.	Pos.	Nation	Player
8	DF	KOS	Përparim Osmani (on loan from Prishtina)
9	FW	NGA	Kyrian Nwabueze (from (North Macedonia) Pobeda)
21	DF	KOS	Denis Haliti
30	GK	BUL	Mario Kirev (from (Albania) Kamza)
45	FW	KOS	Festim Krasniqi (from (North Macedonia) Renova)
42	MF	ALB	Klajdi Burba (from (Norway) Viking U19)

Out: Note: Flags indicate national team as defined under FIFA eligibility rules; some limited exceptions apply. Players may hold more than one non-FIFA nationality.

No.	Pos.	Nation	Player
17	DF	ALB	Ervis Kaja (to (Albania) Dinamo Tirana)
23	DF	KOS	Arbër Shala (to (Albania) Kamza)
27	DF	ALB	Eri Lamçja (to (Albania) Bylis Ballsh)
31	DF	ALB	Edvan Bakaj (to (Albania) Luftëtari Gjirokastër)
62	DF	KOS	Viktor Kuka (to Ferizaj)

== Pre-season and friendlies ==
=== Friendlies ===
15 June 2018 Friendly	Laçi (Albania)	0–1	(Kosovo) Drita	Laç, Albania
17:00 (UTC+1)		Report	Gërbeshi 55' (pen.)	Stadium: Laçi Stadium

19 June 2018 Friendly	Shkupi (North Macedonia)	2–0	(Kosovo) Drita	Čair, Macedonia
17:00 (UTC+1)	Imeri 64'; Muharemi 85'	Report		Stadium: Čair Stadium

== Competitions ==
Win Draw Loss

=== Overview ===
Competition	First match	Last match	Starting round	Final position	Record							
Competition	First match	Last match	Starting round	Final position	Pld	W	D	L	GF	GA	GD	Win %
Football Superleague of Kosovo	19 August 2018	19 May 2019	Matchday 1	TBD	17	7	2	8	25	22	+3	41.18
Kosovar Cup	31 October 2018		Quarter-finals	Eliminated	2	1	0	1	0	0	+0	50.00
Kosovar Supercup	13 August 2018		Final	Winners	1	1	0	0	2	1	+1	100.00
Champions League	26 June 2018	17 July 2018	First qualifying round	Eliminated	4	2	0	2	6	6	+0	50.00
Europa League	26 July 2018	2 August 2018	Second qualifying round	Eliminated	2	0	1	1	2	3	−1	0.00
Total					26	11	3	12	35	32	+3	42.31

Last updated: 19 August 2018
Source: Competitions

=== Football Superleague of Kosovo ===
==== Standings ====
Pos	Team	Pld	W	D	L	GF	GA	GD	Pts	Qualification or relegation
2	Prishtina	33	23	6	4	49	12	+37	75	Qualification for the Europa League preliminary round (Note: Since the winners of the Kosovar Cup, Feronikeli, qualified for the Champions League, the spot given to the Cup winners was passed to the second-placed team.)
3	Llapi	33	22	3	8	54	24	+30	69	
4	Drita	33	14	6	13	47	39	+8	48	
5	Ferizaj	33	14	4	15	39	41	−2	46	
6	Flamurtari	33	12	9	12	33	39	−6	45	

Source: Football Federation of Kosovo (in Albanian), Soccerway
Rules for classification: 1) Points; 2) Goal difference; 3) Goals scored; 4) Draw; 5) Head-to-head points; 6) Head-to-head goal difference; 7) Head-to-head away goals scored (only if between two teams); 8) Head-to-head goals scored; 9) Play-off (tie-breakers 2, 3 and 4 only used for ties that do not involve deciding the champion, play-offs participation or relegation).

===== Results summary =====
Overall								Home						Away					
Pld	W	D	L	GF	GA	GD	Pts	W	D	L	GF	GA	GD	W	D	L	GF	GA	GD
15	7	2	6	25	20	+5	23	3	2	3	23	17	+6	4	0	3	2	3	−1

===== Goalscorers =====
No.	Pos.	Nation	Name	Superleague of Kosovo	Kosovar Cup	Total
7	MF	(Kosovo)	Endrit Krasniqi	4	0	4
22	FW	(Kosovo)	Betim Haxhimusa	7	0	7
4	DF	(Kosovo)	Fidan Gërbeshi	2	0	2
4	DF	(Albania)	Ervis Kaja	1	0	1
93	MF	(Kosovo)	Haxhi Neziraj	2	0	2
10	MF	(Kosovo)	Xhevdet Shabani	3	0	3
25	MF	(Kosovo)	Bujar Shabani	3	0	3
23	MF	(Kosovo)	Arbër Shala	1	0	1
14	MF	(Kosovo)	Filonit Shaqiri	1	0	1
TOTAL				20	0	20

Last updated: 23 September 2018

===== Disciplinary record =====
No.	Pos.	Name	Superliga		Kosovar Cup		Kosovar SuperCup		Total	
No.	Pos.	Name	Booked	Sent off (straight red)	Booked	Sent off (straight red)	Booked	Sent off (straight red)	Booked	Sent off (straight red)
4	DF	(Kosovo) Fidan Gërbeshi	6	0	0	0	0	0	6	0
13	DF	(Kosovo) Liridon Leci	7	0	1	0	0	0	7	1
62	DF	(Kosovo) Viktor Kuka	5	0	0	0	0	0	5	0
10	MF	(Kosovo) Xhevdet Shabani	5	0	0	0	0	0	5	0
93	MF	(Kosovo) Haxhi Neziraj	2	0	0	0	0	0	2	0
23	MF	(Kosovo) Arbër Shala	2	0	0	0	0	0	2	0
25	MF	(Kosovo) Bujar Shabani	5	1	0	0	0	0	5	1
22	MF	(Kosovo) Betim Haxhimusa	6	0	0	0	0	0	6	0
27	MF	(Kosovo) Eri Lamcja	2	0	0	0	0	0	2	0
4	MF	(Kosovo) Filonit Shaqiri	4	0	0	0	0	0	4	0
7	MF	(Kosovo) Endrit Krasniqi	3	0	0	0	0	0	3	0
20	MF	(Kosovo) Erjon Vucaj	1	0	0	0	0	0	1	0
Total			48	0	0	0	0	0	48	2

Last updated: 10 February 2019 Source: ffk-kosova.com

==== Matches ====
19 August 2018 1	Drita	5–0	KEK	Gjilan, Kosovo
15:45	Krasniqi 22', 74'; Haxhimusa 66', 85'; Gërbeshi 80'	Report		Stadium: Gjilan City Stadium; Attendance: 0 Referee: Dardan Çaka; Assistant referees: Besnik Morina; Imran Kabashi; Fourth official: Fatmir Tahiri; Man of the Match: Endrit Krasniqi
Note: This match will be held with no attendance

6 August 2018 2	Drita	1–3	Flamurtari	Gjilan, Kosovo
16:45	Kaja 23'	Report	Kabashi 47'; Shillova 79', 97'	Stadium: Gjilan City Stadium; Attendance: 0 Referee: Selami Isufi; Assistant referees: Farmir Abrashi; Erdual Baliqi; Fourth official: Leutrim Mustafa; Man of the Match: Alban Shillova
Note: This match will be held with no attendance

31 August 2018 3	Liria	3–2	Drita	Prizren, Kosovo
16:45	Gashi 43'; Fetahaj 65', 73'	Report	Shabani 30'; Neziraj 53'	Stadium: Përparim Thaçi Stadium; Referee: Fatmir Tahiri; Assistant referees: Edmond Zeqiri; Imran Kabashi; Fourth official: Alban Shala

12 September 2018 4	Drita	1–2	Llapi	Gjilan, Kosovo
15:45	B. Shabani 37'	Report	Hajdari 10'; Alidema 78'	Stadium: Gjilan City Stadium

15 September 2018 5	Feronikeli	4–0	Drita	Glogovac, Kosovo
15:45		Report		Stadium: Rexhep Rexhepi Stadium

22 September 2018 6	Drita	1-0	Prishtina	Gjilan, Kosovo
15:45	Arbër Shala 59'	Report		Stadium: Gjilan City Stadium; Attendance: 9.340; Man of the Match: Arbër Shala

29 September 2018 7	Gjilani	1-0	Drita	Gjilan, Kosovo
15:30	Wilber Pérez 43'	Report		Stadium: Gjilan City Stadium; Attendance: 13.545; Referee: Genc Nuza; Assistant referees: Fatlum Berisha; Bujar Selimaj; Fourth official: Visar Kastrati

3 October 2018 8	Drita	1-1	Trepça'89	Gjilan, Kosovo
16:00				Stadium: Gjilan City Stadium

7 October 2018 9	Drenica	1-2	Drita	Skenderaj, Kosovo
16:00	Taulant Dajaku 85'		B. Shabani 65'; Xh. Shabani 88'	Stadium: Bajram Aliu

17 November 2018 10	Drita	6-1	Ballkani	Gjilan
16:00	Haxhimusa 12', 89'; Gërbeshi 36' (pen.); Shaqiri 47'; Kukaj^{Own Goal} 59'; Krasniqi 75'	Report	Baftiu 86'	Stadium: Gjilan City Stadium

21 November 2018 11	Ferizaj	0-2	Drita	Ferizaj
16:00		Report	Haxhimusa 31' Neziraj 95'

27 October 2018 12	KEK	1-2	Drita	Obilić
15:45	'88	Report	Haxhiusa 7' (92)	Stadium: Agron Rama Stadium; Man of the Match: Betim Haxhimusa

30 October 2018 13	KF Flamurtari	0-1	Drita	Pristina
14:45		Report	Endrit Krasniqi 25'	Stadium: Xhemail Ibishi Stadium; Man of the Match: Endrit Krasniqi

4 November 2018 14	Drita	0-1	Liria	Pristina
14:45		Report	Liridon Fetahaj 86'	Stadium: Stadiumi i Qytetit

10 November 2018 15	Llapi	1-0	Drita	Pristina
14:45	Festim Alidema 31'	Report		Stadium: Stadiumi i Qytetit

25 November 2018 16	Drita	1-1	Feronikeli	Stadiumi i Qytetit
14:45	Bujar Shabani 69'	Report	Lapidar Lladrovci 41'

2 December 2018 17	Prishtina	2-0	Drita	Pristina
14:45	Meriton Korenica 56'; Basit Abdul Khalid 90+4'	Report		Stadium: Pristina City Stadium

18 February 2019 18	Drita	3-1	Gjilani	Gjilan
14:45	Ardian Limani 8'; Kyrian Nwabueze 72'; Erjon Vucaj 95'; Fidan Gerbeshi (red card) 97'	Report	Fiton Hajdari 69'; (red card) 97' Ansi Nika	Stadium: Gjilan City Stadium; Attendance: 10,000; Referee: Besfort Kosumi; Assistant referees: Edmond Zeqiri; Fatmir Sekiraqa; Fourth official: Ilir Mehmeti; Man of the Match: Kyrian Nwabueze
Note: Kosovo Derby

24 February 2019 19	Trepça 89	1-0	Drita	Mitrovica, Kosovo
14:45	Hyshmeri 13'	Report

1 March 2019 20	Drita	2-1	Drenica	Gjilan, Kosovo
13:30	Nwabueze K. 92'; Xh. Shabani 94'	Report		Stadium: Gjilan City Stadium

5 March 2019 21	KF Ballkani	1-2	Drita	Therandë
13:30	Jetmir Topalli 13'	Report	Haxhi Neziraj 57'; Nwabueze 69'

9 March 2019 22	Drita	1-0	KF Ferizaj	Gjilan, Kosovo
14:45	Nwabueze 14'	Report		Stadium: Gjilan City Stadium

23	Drita	v	KF Ferizaj	Gjilan, Kosovo
				Stadium: Gjilan City Stadium

24	KF Liria	v	Drita

25	Drita	v	KF KEK	Gjilan, Kosovo
				Stadium: Gjilan City Stadium

26	SC Gjilani	v	Drita
Note: Kosovo Derby

27	Drita	v	KF Drenica	Gjilan, Kosovo
				Stadium: Gjilan City Stadium

28	Drita	v	Trepça'89	Gjilan, Kosovo
				Stadium: Gjilan City Stadium

29	KF Llapi	v	Drita

30	Drita	v	FC Prishtina	Gjilan, Kosovo
				Stadium: Gjilan City Stadium

31	KF Feronikeli	v	Drita

32	Drita	v	KF Flamurtari	Gjilan, Kosovo
				Stadium: Gjilan City Stadium

33	KF Ballkani	v	Drita

Last updated: 18 August 2018.
Source: Football Federation of Kosovo

=== Kosovar Supercup ===
As the winners of the 2017–18 Kosovar Cup and 2017–18 Football Superleague of Kosovo, Drita faced the Kosovar Cup winner, Prishtina for the season opening Kosovar Supercup.

13 August 2018 2017–18 Kosovar Supercup	Drita	2–1	Prishtina	Pristina, Kosovo
20:00 (UTC+1)	Gërbeshi 64' (pen.); Haxhimusa 82'	Report	Mankenda 34'	Stadium: Fadil Vokrri Stadium; Attendance: 10,000; Referee: Genc Nuza (Kosovo)

=== Kosovar Cup ===
8 December 2018 Round of 16	Drita	5-3	Minatori	Pristina
11:30 (UTC+1)	Bujar Shabani 24' (57); Shenon Neziraj 38'; Arber Shala 46'; Xhevdet Shabani 70'	Report	Lorik Dobratiqi 8'; Gentrit Bislimi 60'; Flamur Gashi 76'	Stadium: Stadiumi i Qytetit

9 February 2019 Quarter-finals	Vëllaznimi	1-0	Drita	Gjakova, Kosovo
13:00	Tun Bardhoku 42'	Report		Referee: Alban Shala

=== Pre-season and friendlies ===
29 January 2019 Friendly	Drita (Kosovo)	1–2	(Turkey) Antalyaspor	Lara, Turkey
14:30 EET (UTC+2)	Festim Kraniqi			Stadium: Lara Sports Complex

2 February 2019 Friendly	Drita (Kosovo)	1–0	(Romania) Petrolul Ploiești	Lara, Turkey
14:30 EET (UTC+2)	Nwabueze 7'	Report		Stadium: Lara Sports Complex

=== UEFA Champions League ===
Drita competed in the UEFA Champions League for the first time in the 2018–19 season, entering at the preliminary round. On 12 June 2018, in Nyon, the draw was held and Drita were drawn against the Andorran side Santa Coloma. On 26 June 2018, Drita beat Santa Coloma at Victoria Stadium in Gibraltar and became the first Kosovar side to win a UEFA Champions League match.

26 June 2018 Preliminary round	Santa Coloma (Andorra)	0–2 (a.e.t.)	(Kosovo) Drita	Gibraltar
17:00		Report	Shabani 99'; Gërbeshi 105+3' (pen.)	Stadium: Victoria Stadium; Attendance: 288; Referee: Paul Mclaughlin (Republic of Ireland)

29 June 2018 Preliminary round	Lincoln Red Imps (Gibraltar)	1–4 (a.e.t.)	(Kosovo) Drita	Gibraltar
20:30	Corral 61'	Report	Leci 2', 105+3' (pen.); Shabani 120'; Neziraj 120+4'	Stadium: Victoria Stadium; Attendance: 468; Referee: Manfredas Lukjančukas (Lithuania)

10 July 2018 First qualifying round	Drita (Kosovo)	0–3	(Sweden) Malmö	Mitrovica, Kosovo
20:45		Report	Strandberg 13'; Traustason 39'; Rosenberg 82'	Stadium: Olympic Stadium Adem Jashari; Attendance: 9,780; Referee: Boris Marhefka (Slovakia)

17 July 2018 First qualifying round	Malmö (Sweden)	2–0	(Kosovo) Drita	Malmö, Sweden
19:00	Strandberg 55'; Larsson 60'	Report		Stadium: Malmö Stadion, Malmö; Attendance: 10,623; Referee: Laurent Kopriwa (Luxembourg)

=== UEFA Europa League ===
After being eliminated from Malmö, Drita continued to play in the second qualifying round of UEFA Europa League. On 17 July 2018, Drita teaches the upcoming rival which was the champion of 2017–18 Luxembourg National Division, F91 Dudelange.

26 July 2018 Second qualifying round	F91 Dudelange (Luxembourg)	2–1	(Kosovo) Drita	Dudelange, Luxembourg
18:30	Perez 66'; Turpel 81' (pen.)	Report	Shabani 45+2'	Stadium: Stade Jos Nosbaum; Attendance: 737; Referee: Leontios Trattou (Cyprus)

2 August 2018 Second qualifying round	Drita (Kosovo)	1–1	(Luxembourg) F91 Dudelange	Mitrovica, Kosovo
20:45	Limani 26'	Report	Stumpf 46'	Stadium: Olympic Stadium Adem Jashari; Attendance: 2,200; Referee: Michael Tykgaard (Denmark)
