= Kosovo football clubs in European competitions =

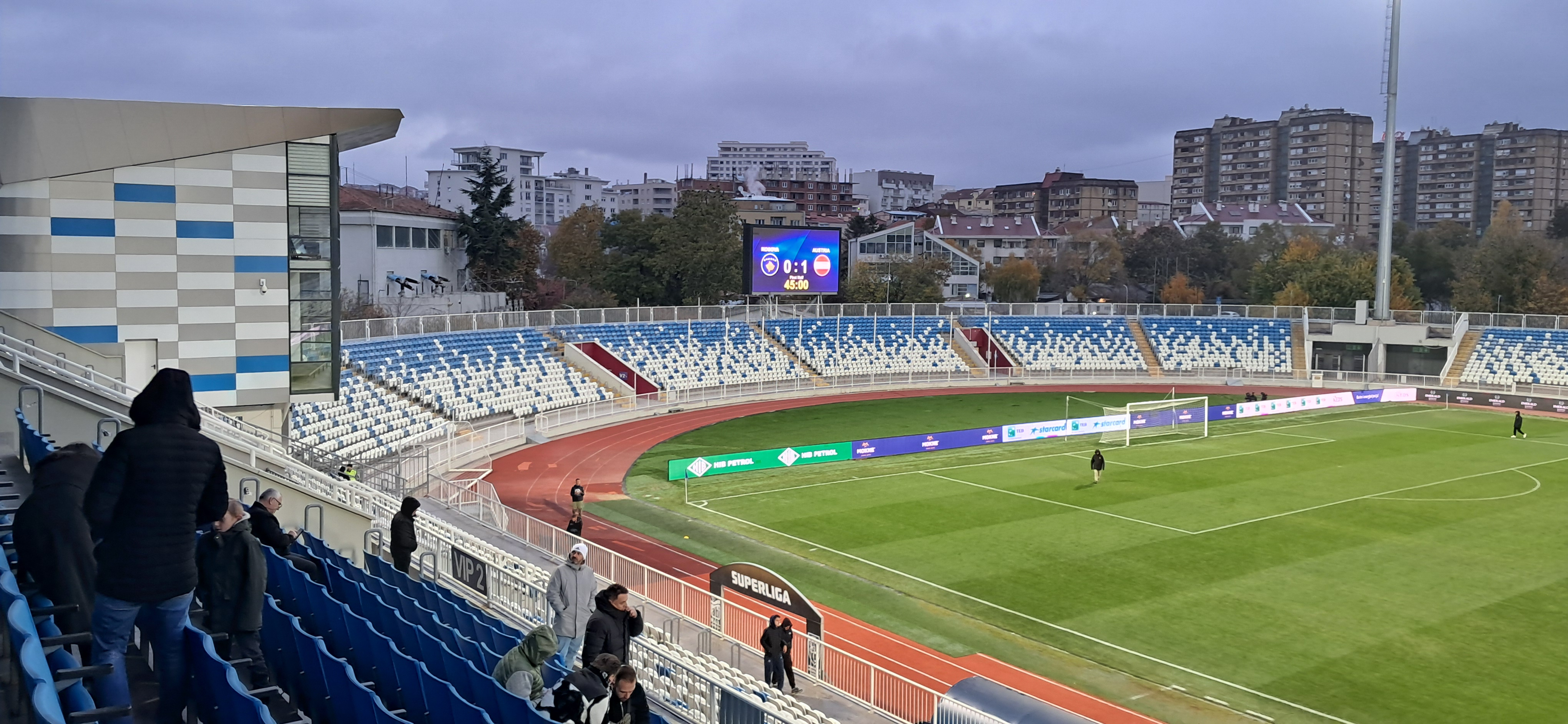
- Kosovo football clubs that participate in European competitions play their home matches at the Fadil Vokrri Stadium in Pristina
- Seasons played: UCL: Nine seasons (2017–); UEL: Six seasons (2017–2020; 2024–); UECL: Five seasons (2021–); UYL: One season (2024–)
- Top scorer: List of top scorers
- First entry: UCL: 2017–18; UEL: 2017–18; UECL: 2021–22; UYL: 2024–25
- Latest entry: UCL: 2025–26; UEL: 2025–26; UECL: 2025–26; UYL: 2024–25

On 3 May 2016, Kosovo became a full member of UEFA, the governing body of association football in Europe. Kosovo football clubs can qualify for UEFA's two of the three main continental competitions, the UEFA Champions League since the 2017–18 season, the UEFA Conference League since the 2021–22 season and the UEFA Europa League since the 2017–18 season, but with a three-season absence (2021–22 season, 2022–23 season and 2023–24 season) due to UEFA's change in the way it qualified for competitions based on country coefficients.

== Competitions ==
=== Main ===
==== UEFA Champions League ====
Performances by clubs
Club	Pld	W	D	L	Win %
Drita	12	5	1	6	41.67
Ballkani	6	2	1	3	33.33
Prishtina	4	2	0	2	50.00
Feronikeli	4	2	1	1	50.00
Trepça '89	2	0	0	2	0.00
Total	28	11	3	14	39.29

Season	Team	Round	Opponent	Home	Away	Agg.
2017–18	Trepça '89	1Q	(Faroe Islands) Víkingur Gøta	1–4	1–2	2–6
2018–19	Drita	PR	(Andorra) FC Santa Coloma	2–0 (a.e.t.)		
2018–19	Drita	PR	(Gibraltar) Lincoln Red Imps	4–1 (a.e.t.)		
2018–19	Drita	1Q	(Sweden) Malmö	0–3	0–2	0–5
2019–20	Feronikeli	PR	(Gibraltar) Lincoln Red Imps	1–0		
2019–20	Feronikeli	PR	(Andorra) FC Santa Coloma	2–1		
2019–20	Feronikeli	1Q	(Wales) The New Saints	0–1	2–2	2–3
2020–21	Drita	PR	(Andorra) Inter d'Escaldes	2–1		
2020–21	Drita	PR	(Northern Ireland) Linfield	0–3 (awarded)		
2021–22	Prishtina	PR	(San Marino) Folgore	2–0		
2021–22	Prishtina	PR	(Andorra) Inter d'Escaldes	2–0		
2021–22	Prishtina	1Q	(Hungary) Ferencváros	1–3	0–3	1–6
2022–23	Ballkani	1Q	(Lithuania) Žalgiris	1–1	0–1 (a.e.t.)	1–2
2023–24	Ballkani	1Q	(Bulgaria) Ludogorets Razgrad	2–0	0–4	2–4
2024–25	Ballkani	1Q	(Andorra) UE Santa Coloma	1–2 (a.e.t.)	2–1	3–3 (5–6 p)
2025–26	Drita	1Q	(Luxembourg) Differdange 03	1–0	3–2	4–2
2025–26	Drita	2Q	(Denmark) Copenhagen	0–1	0–2	0–3
2026–27	Drita	1Q	(Lithuania) Kauno Žalgiris	2–3	1–1	3–4

==== UEFA Europa League ====
Performances by clubs
Club	Pld	W	D	L	Win %
Prishtina	11	2	4	5	18.18
Drita	6	1	1	4	16.67
Gjilani	2	1	0	1	50.00
Feronikeli	2	0	0	2	0.00
Llapi	2	0	0	2	0.00
Total	23	4	5	14	17.39

Season	Team	Round	Opponent	Home	Away	Agg.
2017–18	Prishtina	1Q	(Sweden) Norrköping	0–1	0–5	0–6
2018–19	Prishtina	PR	(Gibraltar) Europa	5–0	1–1	6–1
2018–19	Prishtina	1Q	(Luxembourg) Fola Esch	0–0 (4–5 p)	0–0	0–0 (4–5 p)
2018–19	Drita	2Q	(Luxembourg) F91 Dudelange	1–1	1–2	2–3
2019–20	Prishtina	PR	(Gibraltar) St Joseph's	1–1	0–2	1–3
2019–20	Feronikeli	2Q	(Slovakia) Slovan Bratislava	0−2	1−2	1−4
2020–21	Prishtina	PR	(Gibraltar) Lincoln Red Imps	0–3 (awarded)		
2020–21	Gjilani	PR	(San Marino) Tre Penne	3–1		
2020–21	Gjilani	1Q	(Cyprus) APOEL	0–2 (a.e.t.)		
2020–21	Drita	2Q	(North Macedonia) Sileks	2–0		
2020–21	Drita	3Q	(Poland) Legia Warsaw	0–2		
2021–22 2022–23 2023–24	did not qualify					
2024–25	Llapi	1Q	(Poland) Wisła Kraków	1–2	0–2	1−4
2025–26	Prishtina	1Q	(Moldova) Sheriff Tiraspol	2–1	0–4	2–5
2025–26	Drita	3Q	(Romania) FCSB	1–3	2–3	3–6

==== UEFA Conference League ====
Performances by clubs
Club	Pld	W	D	L	Win %
Ballkani	36	18	5	13	50.00
Drita	28	11	6	11	39.29
Prishtina	6	2	2	2	33.33
Dukagjini	6	2	0	4	33.33
Gjilani	4	1	1	2	25.00
Malisheva	8	3	0	5	37.50
Llapi	6	0	3	3	0.00
Total	94	37	17	40	39.36

Season	Team	Round	Opponent	Home	Away	Agg.
2021–22	Llapi	1Q	(North Macedonia) Shkupi	1–1	0–2	1–3
2021–22	Drita	1Q	(Montenegro) Dečić	2–1	1–0	3–1
2021–22	Drita	2Q	(Netherlands) Feyenoord	0–0	2–3	2–3
2021–22	Prishtina	2Q	(Wales) Connah's Quay Nomads	4–1	2–4	6–5
2021–22	Prishtina	3Q	(Norway) Bodø/Glimt	2–1	0–2	2–3
2022–23	Gjilani	1Q	(Latvia) Liepāja	1–0	1–3	2–3
2022–23	Llapi	1Q	(Montenegro) Budućnost Podgorica	2–2	0–2	2–4
2022–23	Drita	1Q	(Finland) Inter Turku	3–0	0–1	3–1
2022–23	Drita	2Q	(Belgium) Antwerp	0–2	0–0	0–2
2022–23	Ballkani	2Q	(San Marino) La Fiorita	6–0	4–0	10–0
2022–23	Ballkani	3Q	(Faroe Islands) KÍ	3–2	1–2 (a.e.t.)	4–4 (4–3 p)
2022–23	Ballkani	PO	(North Macedonia) Shkupi	1–0	2–1	3–1
2022–23	Ballkani	GS	(Czech Republic) Slavia Prague	0–1	2–3	4th
2022–23	Ballkani	GS	(Romania) CFR Cluj	1–1	0–1	4th
2022–23	Ballkani	GS	(Turkey) Sivasspor	1–2	4–3	4th
2023–24	Gjilani	1Q	(Luxembourg) Progrès Niederkorn	0–2	2–2	2-4
2023–24	Dukagjini	1Q	(Gibraltar) Europa	2–1	3–2	5–3
2023–24	Dukagjini	2Q	(Croatia) Rijeka	0–1	1–6	1–7
2023–24	Drita	2Q	(Czech Republic) Viktoria Plzeň	1–2	0–0	1–2
2023–24	Ballkani	2Q	(Northern Ireland) Larne	3–0	4–1	7–1
2023–24	Ballkani	3Q	(Gibraltar) Lincoln Red Imps	2–0	3–1	5–1
2023–24	Ballkani	PO	(Belarus) BATE Borisov	4–1	0–1	4–2
2023–24	Ballkani	GS	(Croatia) Dinamo Zagreb	2–0	0–3	4th
2023–24	Ballkani	GS	(Czech Republic) Viktoria Plzeň	0–1	0–1	4th
2023–24	Ballkani	GS	(Kazakhstan) Astana	1–2	0–0	4th
2024–25	Malisheva	1Q	(Montenegro) Budućnost Podgorica	1–0	0–3	1–3
2024–25	Llapi	2Q	(Denmark) Brøndby	2–2	0–6	2–8
2024–25	Ballkani	2Q	(Malta) Ħamrun Spartans	0–0	2–0	2–0
2024–25	Ballkani	3Q	(Northern Ireland) Larne	0–1	1–0 (a.e.t.)	1–1 (1–4 p)
2024–25	Drita	2Q	(Iceland) Breiðablik	1–0	2–1	3–1
2024–25	Drita	3Q	(Latvia) Auda	3–1 (a.e.t.)	0–1	3–2
2024–25	Drita	PO	(Poland) Legia Warsaw	0–2	0–1	0–3
2025–26	Malisheva	1Q	(Iceland) Víkingur Reykjavík	0–8	0–1	0–9
2025–26	Prishtina	2Q	(Northern Ireland) Larne	1–1 (a.e.t.)	0–0	1–1 (4–5 p)
2025–26	Ballkani	2Q	(Malta) Floriana	4–2	1–1	5–3
2025–26	Ballkani	3Q	(Republic of Ireland) Shamrock Rovers	1–0	0–4	1–4
2025–26	Drita	PO	(Luxembourg) Differdange 03	2–1	1–0	3–1
2025–26	Drita	LP	(Finland) KuPS	1–1		20th
2025–26	Drita	LP	(Cyprus) Omonia	1–1		20th
2025–26	Drita	LP	(Republic of Ireland) Shelbourne	1–0		20th
2025–26	Drita	LP	(North Macedonia) Shkëndija	1–0		20th
2025–26	Drita	LP	(Netherlands) AZ Alkmaar	0–3		20th
2025–26	Drita	LP	(Spain) Rayo Vallecano	0–3		20th
2025–26	Drita	KPPO	(Slovenia) Celje	2–3	2–3	4–6
2026–27	Ballkani	1Q	(Wales) Connah's Quay Nomads	3–2	0–0	3–2
2026–27	Ballkani	2Q	(Republic of Ireland) Bohemians	3–2 (a.e.t.)	1–2	4–4 (4–5 p)
2026–27	Malisheva	1Q	(Albania) Vllaznia	5–0	1–2	6–2
2026–27	Malisheva	2Q	(Scotland) Hibernian	2–0	1–4	3–4
2026–27	Dukagjini	2Q	(Switzerland) Lugano	1–5	0–1	1–6
2026–27	Drita	2Q	(Malta) Floriana	2–1 (a.e.t.)	1–1	3–2
2026–27	Drita	3Q	(San Marino) Tre Fiori	5–0	4–1	9–1
2026–27	Drita	PO	(Andorra) Inter d’Escaldes	2–2		

=== Other ===
==== UEFA Youth League ====
Performances by clubs
Club	Pld	W	D	L	Win %
2 Korriku	8	5	0	3	62.50
Total	8	5	0	3	62.50

Season	Team	Round	Opponent	Home	Away	Agg.
2024–25	2 Korriku	1R	(Albania) Bylis	2–1	1–2	4–2
2024–25	2 Korriku	2R	(Republic of Ireland) UCD	2–1	1–3	5–1
2024–25	2 Korriku	3R	(Ukraine) Dynamo Kyiv	1–4	5–0	1–9
2025–26	2 Korriku	2R	(Scotland) Hibernian	0-4	1-0	1–4

==== Mitropa Cup ====
Performances by clubs
Club	Pld	W	D	L	Win %
Prishtina	6	2	3	1	33.33
Total	6	2	3	1	33.33

Season	Team	Round	Opponent	Home	Away	Agg.
1983–84	Prishtina	RR	(Austria) Eisenstadt	3–3	2–4	Runners-up
1983–84	Prishtina	RR	(Hungary) Vasas	4–2	1–1	Runners-up
1983–84	Prishtina	RR	(Czechoslovakia) Teplice	2–0	1–1	Runners-up

== Cups and Finals ==
=== Mitropa Cup ===
Team	Winners	Runners-up	Years won	Years runner-up
Prishtina	—N/a	1	—N/a	1983–84

== Records ==
=== Top goalscorers ===
- Players in **bold** are active in the Kosovo Superleague.
- Penalty shootout goals after 120 minutes of play are not included.

UEFA Champions League
As of 15 July 2025

Rank	Name (Club)	Goals
1	4 players: (Kosovo) **Arb Manaj** (Drita); (Kosovo) Endrit Krasniqi (Prishtina); (Kosovo) Mendurim Hoti (Feronikeli/Prishtina); (Kosovo) Xhevdet Shabani (Drita)	3
2	(Kosovo) Liridon Leci (Drita)	2
2	(Kosovo) Mevlan Zeka (Feronikeli)	2
3	14 players: (Kosovo) Astrit Fazliu (Feronikeli); (Albania) Bernard Karrica (Ballkani); (Kosovo) Fidan Gërbeshi (Drita); (Kosovo) Fiton Hajdari (Trepça '89); (Kosovo) Florent Hasani (Trepça '89); (Kosovo) **Hamdi Namani** (Drita); (Albania) Haxhi Neziraj (Drita); (Kosovo) Kastriot Rexha (Feronikeli); (Kosovo) Lindon Emërllahu (Ballkani); (Kosovo) Meriton Korenica (Ballkani); (Albania) Nazmi Gripshi (Ballkani); (Kosovo) Qëndrim Zyba (Ballkani); (Kosovo) **Veton Tusha** (Drita); (Algeria) **Walid Hamidi** (Ballkani)	1

UEFA Europa League
As of 14 August 2025

Rank	Name (Club)	Goals
1	(Albania) Armend Dallku (Prishtina)	3
2	(Kosovo) Ardian Limani (Drita)	2
2	(Kosovo) **Veton Tusha** (Drita)	2
3	14 players: (Albania) Ahmed Januzi (Prishtina); (Kosovo) **Arb Manaj** (Drita); (Albania) Ardit Hila (Gjilani); (Kosovo) **Ardit Tahiri** (Llapi); (Montenegro) Darko Nikač (Gjilani); (Kosovo) Fidan Gërbeshi (Drita); (Kosovo) Fiton Hajdari (Gjilani); (Democratic Republic of the Congo) Gauthier Mankenda (Prishtina); (Kosovo) **Hamdi Namani** (Prishtina); (Kosovo) Mendurim Hoti (Feronikeli); (Kosovo) Meriton Korenica (Prishtina); (Kosovo) **Mërgim Pefqeli** (Prishtina); (Kosovo) **Rin Ahmeti** (Prishtina); (Kosovo) Xhevdet Shabani (Drita)	1

UEFA Conference League
As of 21 August 2025

Rank	Name (Club)	Goals
1	(Kosovo) Albion Rrahmani (Ballkani)	9
2	(Kosovo) Meriton Korenica (Ballkani)	8
3	(Kosovo) Endrit Krasniqi (Prishtina)	5
4	5 players: (Kosovo) **Armend Thaqi** (Ballkani); (Kosovo) **Bleart Tolaj** (Ballkani); (Serbia) **Iljasa Zulfiu** (Dukagjini); (Albania) Nazmi Gripshi (Ballkani); (Nigeria) **Sunday Adetunji** (Ballkani)	4
5	4 players: (Kosovo) **Albert Dabiqaj** (Gjilani/Drita); (Kosovo) **Almir Kryeziu** (Ballkani); (Kosovo) **Besnik Krasniqi** (Drita); (North Macedonia) Marko Simonovski (Drita)	3
6	8 players: Arbnor Muja (Drita); (Kosovo) **Arbnor Ramadani** (Gjilani); (Albania) **Blerim Krasniqi** (Gjilani/Drita); (Montenegro) Edvin Kuč (Ballkani); (Kosovo) Ermal Krasniqi (Ballkani); (Kosovo) Leonit Abazi (Ballkani); (Nigeria) Otto John (Prishtina); (Algeria) **Walid Hamidi** (Ballkani)	2
7	22 players: (Kosovo) Albin Berisha (Ballkani); (Kosovo) Albion Kurtaj (Llapi); (Brazil) Alef Firmino (Llapi); (Kosovo) **Almir Ajzeraj** (Drita); (Kosovo) **Arb Manaj** (Drita); (Kosovo) **Arbër Potoku** (Ballkani); (Kosovo) Arbër Shala (Dukagjini); (North Macedonia) Ardian Cuculi (Drita); (Kosovo) Astrit Fazliu (Drita); (Kosovo) **Bajram Jashanica** (Ballkani); (Albania) Bernard Karrica (Ballkani); (Kosovo) Bujar Shabani (Dukagjini); (Kosovo) Drilon Fazliu (Llapi); (Kosovo) **Elvir Gashjani** (Llapi); **Etnik Brruti** (Malisheva); (Kosovo) **Gjelbrim Taipi** (Prishtina); (Kosovo) Kastriot Selmani (Drita); (Kosovo) Leotrim Bekteshi (Prishtina); (Albania) Lorenc Trashi (Ballkani); (Kosovo) Qëndrim Zyba (Ballkani); (Kosovo) **Rron Broja** (Drita); (Kosovo) **Veton Tusha** (Drita)	1
