= List of FC Drita seasons =

This is a list of all seasons played by FC Drita in national and European football, from 1999 to the most recent completed season.

This list details the club's achievements in all major competitions.

== Seasons ==
Season	Division									Cup	Supercup	European competitions		Top goalscorer(s)	
Season	Division	Pos	Pld	W	D	L	GF	GA	Pts	Cup	Supercup	Competition	Round	Player	Goals
1999–2000	Superleague	2nd	34	21	3	10	66	40	66	—N/a	—N/a				
2000–01	Superleague	4th	30	16	6	8	41	25	51	W	—N/a				
2001–02	Superleague	4th	26	12	4	10	43	28	40	—N/a	RU				
2002–03	Superleague	1st	26	14	9	3	53	22	51	QF	—N/a				
2003–04	Superleague	6th	24	9	6	9	37	33	33	SF	RU				
2004–05	Superleague	11th	32	13	3	16	37	44	42	QF	—N/a				
2005–06	First League	5th	29	11	2	16	47	50	35	R32	—N/a				
2006–07	First League	2nd	26	17	5	4	44	20	56	R16	—N/a				
2007–08	Superleague	12th	30	10	8	12	39	48	38	QF	—N/a				
2008–09	Superleague	16th	30	6	5	19	34	52	23	QF	—N/a				
2009–10	First League	12th	30	11	5	14	51	51	38	R32	—N/a				
2010–11	First League	1st	28	17	8	3	46	20	59	—N/a	—N/a				
2011–12	Superleague	6th	33	13	8	12	44	42	47	R16	—N/a				
2012–13	Superleague	7th	33	11	12	10	44	45	45	R16	—N/a				
2013–14	Superleague	7th	33	11	12	10	43	37	47	SF	—N/a				
2014–15	Superleague	9th	33	10	9	14	30	38	39	R16	—N/a				
2015–16	Superleague	10th	33	9	9	15	33	44	36	RU	—N/a				
2016–17	Superleague	9th	33	9	8	16	21	34	35	R16	—N/a				
2017–18	Superleague	1st	33	18	13	2	53	21	67	QF	—N/a			Kastriot Rexha	13
2018–19	Superleague	4th	33	14	6	13	47	39	48	QF	W	Champions League; Europa League	QR1; QR2	Betim Haxhimusa	9
2019–20	Superleague	1st	33	21	5	7	57	23	68	R32	—N/a			Kastriot Rexha	13
2020–21	Superleague	2nd	36	22	10	4	59	28	76	R16	RU	Champions League; Europa League	PR; QR3	Kastriot Rexha	8
