= 2015–16 Kosovar Cup =

Tournament details
- Country: Kosovo

Final positions
- Champions: FC Prishtina
- Runners-up: KF Drita

The 2015–16 Kosovar Cup was the football knockout competition of Kosovo in the 2015–16 season.

== First round ==
These matches were played on 13, 14 and 21 October 2015.

Team 1	Score	Team 2
KF KEK (II)	3–0 w/o	KF Feronikeli (I)
KF Flamurtari (II)	0–2	KF Trepça '89 (I)
KF Vëllaznimi (II)	0–1	KF Liria (I)
KF Ferizaj (II)	1–1 (11–10 p)	KF Fushë Kosova (I)
KF Dukagjini (II)	2–1	KF Trepça (I)
KF Hajvalia (I)	6–0	KF Kosova Prishtinë (II)
KF Rahoveci (II)	0–0 (4–5 p)	FC Prishtina (I)
KF Tefik Çanga (III)	3–0 w/o	KF Besa Pejë (I)
KF Ballkani (II)	1–2	KF Drita (I)
KF Drenica (I)	4–3	KF Behari (II)
KF Bashkimi (III)	1–3	KF Llapi (I)
KF Istogu (I)	2–0	KF 2 Korriku (II)
KF Vitia (II)	0–2	KF Gjilani (I)
KF Luftëtari (II)	1–2	FC Vushtrria (I)

== 1/8 Final ==
These matches were played on 19, 20 and 21 February 2016.

Team 1	Score	Team 2
KF Trepça '89 (I)	1–0	KF Liria (I)
KF Drenica (I)	2–0	KF KEK (II)
FC Prishtina (I)	5–1	KF Istogu (I)
KF Tefik Çanga (III)	0–6	KF Gjilani (I)
KF Dukagjini (II)	0–1	KF Ferizaj (II)
KF Drita (I)	3–1	KF Hajvalia (I)
FC Vushtrria (I)	0–2 (a.e.t.)	KF Llapi (I)

19 February 2016	KF Trepça '89	1–0	KF Liria	Mitrovica
13:30	Mustafa 25'			Stadium: Riza Lushta Stadium; Referee: B. Gashi

20 February 2016	FC Prishtina	5–1	KF Istogu	Pristina
14:30	D. Gashi 6', 45'; P. Osmani 24'; K. Lushtaku 52'; Begolli 75' (pen.)		D. Gashi 59'	Stadium: Pristina City Stadium

20 February 2016	KF Gjilani	6–0	KF Tefik Çanga	Gjilan
14:30	G. Rusi 18', 40', 65', 85'; A. Rexhepi 80'; Salihu 89'			Stadium: Gjilan City Stadium

20 February 2016	KF Drenica	2–0	KF KEK	Skenderaj
14:30	Arifaj 65', 80'			Stadium: Bajram Aliu Stadium

21 February 2016	KF Dukagjini	0–1	KF Ferizaj	Ferizaj
14:30			Bushi 6'	Stadium: Stadiumi Ismet Shabani

21 February 2016	KF Drita	3–1	KF Hajvalia	Gjilan
14:30	Shabani 41', 57'; Sejdiu 81'		Bushi 6'	Stadium: Gjilan City Stadium

21 February 2016	FC Vushtrria	0–2 (a.e.t.)	KF Llapi	Vushtrri
14:30			Ibishi 100'; Kuka 106'	Stadium: Stadiumi i Qyteti

== Quarterfinals ==
This matches will be played on 16 and 17 March 2016. Prishtina got a bye to the semi-finals.

16 March 2016	KF Drenica	0–1	KF Drita	Skenderaj
14:30			Shabani 90+2'	Stadium: Bajram Aliu Stadium

16 March 2016	KF Llapi	4–0	KF Gjilani	Podujeva
14:30	Emini 33'; Zeqiri 42'; Namani 55'; Zabërgja 70'			Stadium: Stadiumi i Qyteti

17 March 2016	KF Ferizaj	1–3 (a.e.t.)	KF Trepça '89	Ferizaj
14:30	Selimi 20'		Pefqeli 48'; Idrizi 113'; Kurtishaj 116'	Stadium: Stadiumi Ismet Shabani

== Semifinals ==
This matches will be played on 27 April and 18 May 2016.

=== First leg ===
27 April 2016	FC Prishtina	3–0	KF Llapi	Pristina
15:00	Thaçi 68'; Osmani 76' (pen.), 90+2'			Stadium: Stadiumi i Qyteti

27 April 2016	KF Trepça '89	1–0	KF Drita	Mitrovica
16:30	Hajdari 90+2'			Stadium: Riza Lushta Stadium

=== Second leg ===
18 May 2016	KF Llapi	1–1 (1–4 agg.)	FC Prishtina	Pristina
16:30	Sinani 42'		Lushtaku 78'	Stadium: Stadiumi i Qyteti

18 May 2016	KF Drita	3–0 (a.e.t.) (3–1 agg.)	KF Trepça '89	Podujevo
16:30	Kelmendi 27' (pen.); Shabani 94'; Murati 119'			Stadium: Stadiumi Merdar

== Final ==
28 May 2016	FC Prishtina	2–1	KF Drita	Pristina
15:00	Khalid 71', 74'		Sejdiu 31'	Stadium: Pristina City Stadium
