= 2018 Kosovar Supercup =

- Event: Kosovar Supercup
Drita	Prishtina
2	1
- Date: 13 August 2018
- Venue: Fadil Vokrri Stadium, Pristina
- Man of the Match: Betim Haxhimusa
- Referee: Genc Nuza
- Attendance: 10,000

The 2018 Kosovar Supercup was the 27th edition of the Kosovar Supercup, an annual football match played between the winners of the previous season's Kosovo Superleague and Kosovar Cup competitions. The match was played between Drita, champions of the 2017–18 Kosovo Superleague and Prishtina, who beat their opponents to win the 2018 Kosovar Cup Final. Watched by a crowd of 10,000, Drita won the match 2–1 and claimed their first Supercup title.

== Match ==
=== Details ===
On 13 August 2018, after renovation was held a 2018 Kosovar Supercup between the winners of the 2017–18 Football Superleague of Kosovo, Drita and 2017–18 Kosovar Cup, Prishtina. Playing for the first time at the recently refurbished Fadil Vokrri Stadium.

13 August 2018
20:00

Drita	2–1	Prishtina
Fidan Gërbeshi 64' (pen.); Betim Haxhimusa 82'	Report	Gauthier Mankenda 34'

Attendance: 10,000
Referee: Genc Nuza (Kosovo)

Drita	Prishtina

31	(Albania) Edvan Bakaj
5	(Kosovo) Ardian Limani
4	(Kosovo) Fidan Gërbeshi (yellow card) 43'
13	(Kosovo) Liridon Leci (yellow card) 67'
11	(Kosovo) Përparim Livoreka (yellow card) 85'
7	(Kosovo) Endrit Krasniqi (substituted off) 90+4'
25	(Kosovo) Bujar Shabani
27	(Albania) Eri Lamçja (yellow card) 55' (substituted off) 75'
10	(Kosovo) Xhevdet Shabani
93	(Albania) Haxhi Neziraj
22	(Kosovo) Betim Haxhimusa
Substitutions:
1	(Kosovo) Leutrim Rexhepi
99	(Kosovo) Dorant Ramadani
23	(Kosovo) Arbër Shala
8	(Brazil) Edenilson
14	(Kosovo) Fillonit Shaqiri (substituted in) 75'
16	(Kosovo) Albin Krasniqi (substituted in) 90+4'
74	(Kosovo) Zgjim Mustafa
Manager:
(Kosovo) Bekim Isufi

12	(Kosovo) Visar Bekaj
2	(Kosovo) Armend Thaqi
8	(Kosovo) Ahmet Haliti
3	(Ghana) Jamal Arago
13	(Ghana) Abdul Bashiru
21	(Kosovo) Argjend Mustafa
66	(Kosovo) Ergyn Ahmeti
15	(Democratic Republic of the Congo) Gauthier Mankenda
17	(Kosovo) Arbër Hoxha
19	(North Macedonia) Alen Jašaroski (substituted off) 84'
9	(Ghana) Basit Abdul Khalid
Substitutions:
1	(Kosovo) Alban Muqiqi
88	(Kosovo) Përparim Osmani
16	(Kosovo) Donat Hasanaj
5	(Kosovo) Diar Miftaraj
7	(Kosovo) Lorik Boshnjaku (substituted in) 84'
26	(Kosovo) Liridon Fetahaj
22	(Kosovo) Kastriot Selmani
Manager:
(Albania) Mirel Josa

== See also ==
- 2017–18 Football Superleague of Kosovo
- 2017–18 Kosovar Cup
- FC Drita–FC Prishtina rivalry
