= 2014–15 Kosovar Cup =

Tournament details
- Country: Kosovo

Final positions
- Champions: KF Feronikeli
- Runners-up: KF Trepça'89

The 2014–15 Kosovar Cup was the football knockout competition of Kosovo in the 2014–15 season.

== First round ==
These matches were played on 25, 26 and 2 November 2014.

Team 1	Score	Team 2
KF Feronikeli (I)	1–1 (2–1 p)	KF Rahoveci (II)
KF Kosova Vushtrri (I)	4–1	KF Tefik Çanga (III)
KF Liria (II)	1–2	KF Besa (I)
FC Prishtina (I)	5–0	KF Ballkani (II)
KF Trepça'89 (I)	2–0	Vicianumi (III)
KF Fushë Kosova (II)	0–1	KF Drenica (I)
KF Ferizaj (I)	3–1	KF Ulpiana (II)
KF Drita (I)	6–2	KF Vllaznia (II)
KF Dukagjini (II)	2–1	KF Hajvalia (I)
KF Flamurtari (I)	4–1	KF Luftëtari Kosova (IV)
KF KEK (II)	1–3	KF Gjilani (II)
KF Llapi (II)	3–1	KF Kosova Prishtinë (II)

== 1/8 Final ==
These matches were played on 10, 11 and 25, 26 March 2015.

Team 1	Score	Team 2
KF Trepça (I)	1–1 (4–5 p)	KF Trepça'89 (I)
KF Llapi (II)	2–1	FC Prishtina (I)
KF Istogu (I)	1–0	KF Dukagjini (II)
KF Feronikeli (I)	3–0	KF Kosova Vushtrri (I)
KF Besa (I)	2–1	KF 2 Korriku (II)
KF Flamurtari (II)	2–2 (1–4 p)	KF Drita (I)
KF Gjilani (II)	2–0	KF Ferizaj (I)

== Quarterfinals ==
These matches will be played on 22 and 23 April 2015.

Team 1	Score	Team 2
KF Drita (I)	4–6	KF Feronikeli (I)
KF Istogu (I)	0–2	KF Drenica (I)
KF Besa (I)	2–0	KF Llapi (II)
KF Gjilani (II)	0–2	KF Trepça'89 (I)

== Semifinals ==
These matches were played on 20 May and 3 June 2015.

=== First leg ===
20 May 2015	KF Besa Pejë	3–2	KF Trepça'89	Peć
15:00	K. Rexha 2'; F. Kasapi 49' (pen.); F. Karahoda 60'		I. Peci 80'; B. Kurtishaj 84'	Stadium: Shahin Haxhiislami Stadium; Referee: Genc Nuza

20 May 2015	KF Feronikeli	0–0	KF Drenica	Prizren
16:30	Hajdari 90+2'			Stadium: Përparim Thaçi Stadium; Referee: Kreshnik Vula

=== Second leg ===
3 June 2015	KF Trepça'89	2–1 (4–4 agg.)	KF Besa Pejë	Mitrovica
16:00	B. Kurtishaj 19'; E. Baliqi 90+1'		F. Karahoda 55'	Stadium: Riza Lushta Stadium; Referee: Genc Nuza

3 June 2015	KF Drenica	0–1 (a.e.t.) (0–1 agg.)	KF Feronikeli	Skenderaj
16:00			Q. Sejdiu 6' (o.g.)	Stadium: Bajram Aliu Stadium; Referee: Kreshnik Vula

== Final ==
14 June 2015	KF Feronikeli	1–1 (a.e.t.) (5–4 p)	KF Trepça'89	Pristina
	B. Maliqi 93' (pen.)		Sh. Idrizi 96'	Stadium: Pristina City Stadium
