= 2013–14 Kosovar Cup =

Tournament details
- Country: Kosovo

Final positions
- Champions: KF Feronikeli
- Runners-up: KF Hajvalia

The 2013–14 Kosovar Cup was the football knockout competition of Kosovo in the 2013–14 season.

== 1/8 Final ==
These matches were played on 28, 29, November 30, 2013

Team 1	Score	Team 2
KF Besa (I)	3–1	KF Fushë Kosova (I)
KF Drenica (I)	1–1 (1–3p)	KF Istogu (II)
KF Drita (I)	8–0	KF Vëllaznimi (II)
KF Hajvalia (I)	4–3	KF Flamurtari (I)
KF Kosova Vushtrri (I)	11–0	KF Tefik Çanga (III)
KF Gjilani (II)	2–1	KF Ulpiana (II)
KF Trepça (I)	0–1	KF Feronikeli (I)
KF Ferizaj (I)	5–2	KF 2 Korriku (II)

== Quarterfinal ==
These matches will be played on 28 February and 1, 2 and March 3, 2014

Team 1	Score	Team 2
KF Besa (I)	0–1	KF Hajvalia (I)
KF Kosova Vushtrri (I)	1–0	KF Ferizaj (I)
KF Gjilani (II)	1–3	KF Drita (I)
KF Istogu (II)	0–0 (3–4 p)	KF Feronikeli (I)

== Semifinals ==
First legs on 9 and 10 April 2014, second legs on 7 and 8 May 2014

Team 1	Agg.	Team 2	1st leg	2nd leg
Drita	0–1	Feronikeli	0–0	0–1
Hajvalia	3-2	Kosova Vushtrri	3–1	0–1

== Final ==
7 June 2014
17:00 CET

Hajvalia	1–2	Feronikeli
Shkëlqim Pacolli 27'		Elhami Berisha 17'; Përparim Livoreka 88'

Pristina City Stadium, Pristina
