= Arsim Plepolli =

Kosovar Albanian footballer

Personal information
- Full name: Arsim Plepolli
- Date of birth: 11 April 1977 (age 49)
- Place of birth: Pristina, SFR Yugoslavia
- Height: 1.80 m (5 ft 11 in)
- Position: Midfielder

Team information
- Current team: Prishtina (assistant)

Senior career*
Years	Team	Apps	(Gls)
2000–2002	Željezničar	26	(6)
2001	→ Olimpija Ljubljana (loan)	8	(1)
2002–2003	Bosna Visoko		
2003–2004	Bashkimi		
2004	Annabichler SV		
2004–2005	SK St. Andrä	23	(7)
2005–2006	SV Spittal/Drau	13	(2)
2006	SAK Klagenfurt		
2006–2007	Besa Pejë		
2007–2008	Elbasani		
2008–2009	KEK		
2009–2010	Drenica		
2010	Aluminium Hormozgan		
2010–2011	Trepça		
2011–2012	Gjilani		

Managerial career
- 2019–2020: Flamurtari (assistant)
- 2022–: Prishtina (assistant)
- * Club domestic league appearances and goals

Arsim Plepolli (born 11 April 1977), also referred as Arsim Prepolli, is a Kosovan professional football coach and former player who is the current assistant manager of Prishtina.

== Career ==
He initially played for KF Flamurtari from Pristina in Kosovo Superleague, and later for many football clubs as Željezničar and Bosna Visoko in the Bosnian Premier League, Aluminium Hormozgan in the Azadegan League, Olimpija Ljubljana, KF Elbasani, etc. Plepolli joined Aluminium Hormozgan in 2009 after spending the previous seasons at KF KEK in Kosovo and KS Elbasani.

== Honours ==
=== Player ===
Flamurtari

- Kosovar Cup: 1995–96

Željezničar

- Bosnian Premier League: 2001–02
- Bosnian Supercup: 2000

Besa Pejë

- Kosovo Superleague: 2006–07
