= 2018–19 Kosovar Cup =

Tournament details
- Country: Kosovo
- Teams: 106

Final positions
- Champions: Feronikeli
- Runners-up: Trepça'89

Tournament statistics
- Matches played: 33
- Goals scored: 109 (3.3 per match)

The 2018–19 Kosovar Cup was the football knockout competition of Kosovo in the 2018–19 season.

Prishtina were the defending champions but they were eliminated in the quarter-finals. Feronikeli defeated Trepça'89 5–1 in the final to win the trophy for the third time.

== Second round ==
The draw for the second round was held on 6 November 2018. The matches were played between 27 November and 5 December 2018. Defending champions Prishtina began the defence of their title away to Drenica. The match finished 0–0 and Prishtina won 5–4 on penalties. Feronikeli defeated Trepça 2–1 and Trepça'89 won 2–0 against Llapi. Liria recorded the biggest win of the competition as they defeated Lugu i Baranit 11–0.

Second round results
No	Date	Matches
1	27.11.2018	Lugu i Baranit 0–11 Liria
2	27.11.2018	Vllaznia Pozheran 1–2 Besa Pejë
3	27.11.2018	Ferizaj 6–2 Vëllazëria Zh.
4	27.11.2018	Fushë Kosova 3–2 Onix
5	27.11.2018	KEK-u 0–1 Flamurtari
6	27.11.2018	Bashkimi (K) 0–4 Vëllaznimi
7	27.11.2018	Sharri 2–6 (a.e.t.) Gjilani
8	27.11.2018	Istogu 3–1 Ramiz Sadiku
9	27.11.2018	Drenasi 0–1 Ballkani
10	27.11.2018	Dukagjini 3–1 Arbëria
11	27.11.2019	Kika 2–0 Vushtrria
12	27.11.2018	Drenica 0–0 (a.e.t.) (4–5 p) Prishtina
13	28.11.2018	Vitia 1–1 (a.e.t.) (1–3 p) Drita
14	28.11.2018	Trepça'89 2–0 Llapi
15	28.11.2018	Trepça 1–2 Feronikeli
16	05.12.2018	Minatori 3–0 2 Korriku

== Third round ==
The draw for the third round was held on 30 November 2018. The matches were played on 8 and 9 December 2018. Defending champions Prishtina won 4–0 away to Liria. Feronikeli also won 4–0 away to Dukagjini and Trepça'89 defeated Flamurtari 3–0 after extra time.

Third round results
No	Date	Matches
1	08.12.2018	Liria 0–4 Prishtina
2	08.12.2018	Fushë Kosova 1–2 Ferizaj
3	08.12.2018	Drita 5–3 Minatori
4	08.12.2018	Besa Pejë 0–0 (a.e.t.) (2–3 p) Vëllaznimi
5	09.12.2018	Trepça'89 3–0 (a.e.t.) Flamurtari
6	09.12.2018	Kika 2–2 (a.e.t.) (3–1 p) Istogu
7	09.12.2018	Ballkani 3–0 Gjilani
8	09.12.2018	Dukagjini 0–4 Feronikeli

== Quarter-finals ==
The draw for the fourth round was held on 11 December 2018. The matches were played on 9 and 10 December 2018. Prishtina and Trepça'89 drew 0–0 and the defending champions were eliminated 5–4 on penalties. Feronikeli defeated Ferizaj 1–0 and Ballkani won 1–0 after extra time against Kika. Vëllaznimi also advanced to the semi-finals with a 1–0 win against Drita.

Quarter-final results
No	Date	Matches
1	09.02.2019	Prishtina 0–0 (a.e.t.) (4–5 p) Trepça'89
2	09.02.2019	Ferizaj 0–1 Feronikeli
3	09.02.2019	Kika 0–1 (a.e.t.) Ballkani
4	09.02.2019	Vëllaznimi 1–0 Drita

== Semifinals ==
These matches were played on 17 April and 1 May 2019.

=== First leg ===
In the first legs, played on 17 April 2019, Trepça'89 won 4–0 away to Vëllaznimi and Feronikeli defeated Ballkani away from home 2–1.

17 April 2019	KF Vëllaznimi	0–4	KF Trepça'89	Gjakova
15:00		Report	E. Hoti 23'; A. Manaj 45'; A. Muja 85'; L. Traore 89'	Stadium: City Stadium (Gjakova)

17 April 2019	KF Ballkani	1–2	KF Feronikeli	Suva Reka
15:00	V. Berisha 88'	Report	M. Hoti 31'; M. Zeka 50'	Stadium: Shahin Haxhiislami Stadium

=== Second leg ===
The second legs were played on 1 May 2019. Despite a 1–0 home loss to Vëllaznimi, Trepça'89 advanced to the final 4–1 on aggregate. Feronikeli also advanced 4–1 on aggregate after defeating Ballkani 2–0.

1 May 2019	KF Trepça'89	0–1 (4–1 agg.)	KF Vëllaznimi	Mitrovica
15:30		Report	E. Gashi 25'	Stadium: Riza Lushta Stadium

1 May 2019	KF Feronikeli	2–0 (4–1 agg.)	KF Ballkani	Glogovac
16:00	L. Lladrovci 17'; A. Magani 82'	Report		Stadium: Rexhep Rexhepi Stadium

== Final ==
24 May 2019	KF Trepça'89	1–5	KF Feronikeli	Pristina
20:45	A. Muja 73'	Report	A. Fazliu 16'; M. Hoti 27'; A. Morina 66'; K. Rexha 70', 90+2'	Stadium: Fadil Vokrri Stadium; Referee: Genc Nuza
