= Almir Ajzeraj =

Kosovar footballer (born 1997)

Personal information
- Date of birth: 5 October 1997 (age 29)
- Place of birth: Pristina, FR Yugoslavia
- Height: 1.73 m (5 ft 8 in)
- Position: Left midfielder

Team information
- Current team: Drita
- Number: 7

Senior career*
Years	Team	Apps	(Gls)
–2017	Flamurtari	15	(3)
2017	KEK		
2017–2018	Flamurtari	12	(3)
2018–2020	Skënderbeu Korçë	1	(0)
2019	→ Ballkani (loan)	15	(1)
2020–	Drita	199	(18)

International career
2017	Kosovo U21	1	(0)
- * Club domestic league appearances and goals as of 22 June 2026

Almir Ajzeraj (born 5 October 1997) is a Kosovan professional footballer who plays as a left midfielder for Kosovan club Drita.

== Club career ==
=== Skënderbeu Korçë ===
On 23 July 2018, Ajzeraj joined Albanian Superliga side Skënderbeu Korçë, on a four-year contract. On 17 August 2018, he made his debut in a 1–0 home win against Partizani Tirana after coming on as a substitute at 73rd minute in place of Nazmi Gripshi.

==== Loan at Ballkani ====
On 28 January 2019, Ajzeraj joined Kosovo Superleague side Ballkani, on loan until the end of 2018–19 season. On 10 February 2019, he made his debut with Ballkani in the quarter-final of 2018–19 Kosovar Cup against Kika after being named in the starting line-up. He made his league appearance on 16 February after being named in the starting line-up in a 2–0 home win against Drenica.

== International career ==
On 21 March 2017, Ajzeraj received a call-up from Kosovo U21 for a 2019 UEFA European Under-21 Championship qualification match against Republic of Ireland U21 and made his debut after coming on as a substitute at 68th minute in place of Leonard Pllana.

== Honours ==
Drita

- Kosovo Superleague: 2024–25
