= Fadil Vokrri Stadium =

Multi-purpose stadium in Kosovo

- Stadiumi Fadil Vokrri
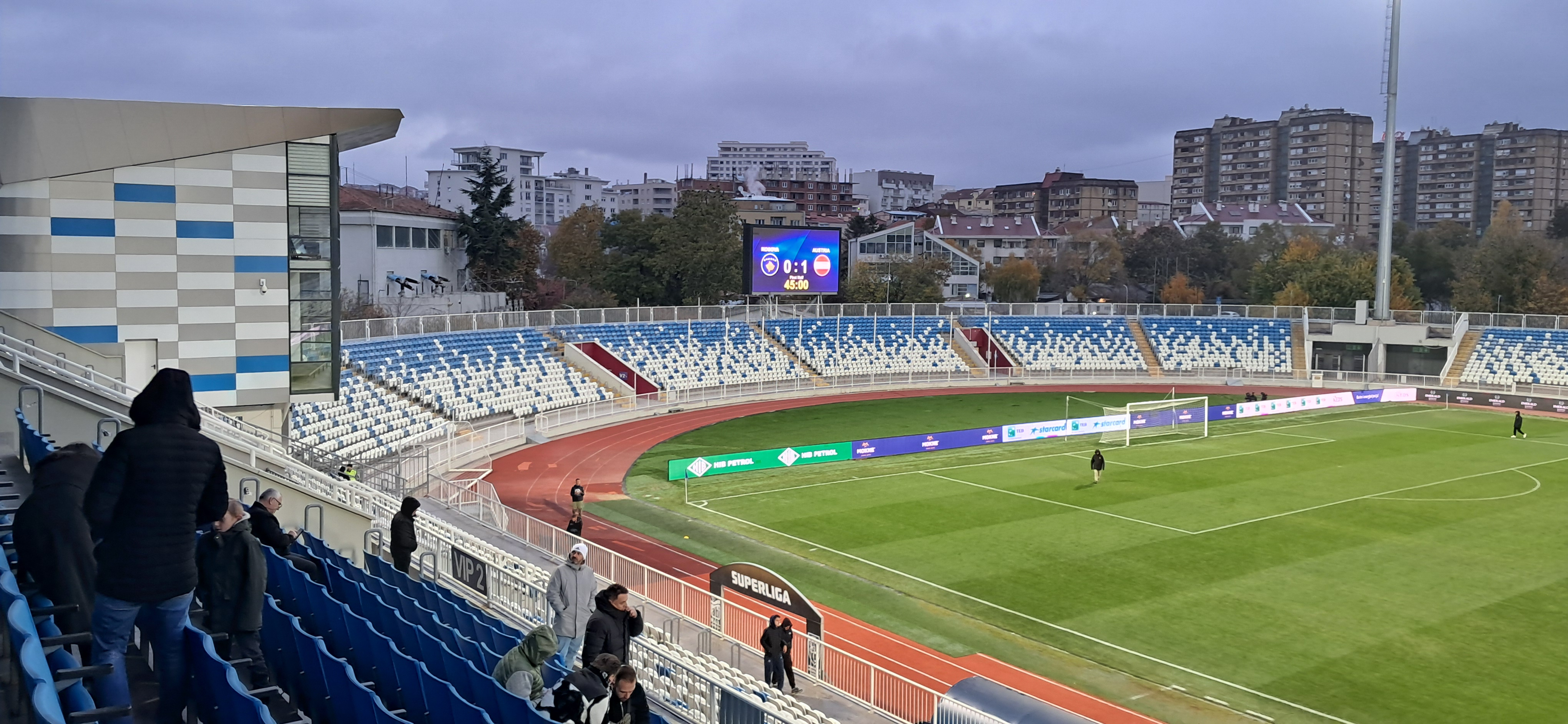
- The stadium in 2024; UEFA
- Interactive map of Fadil Vokrri Stadium
- Former names: Pristina City Stadium (until 2018)
- Address: Enver Zymberi Street, Pristina (near the Palace of Youth and Sports)
- Location: Pristina, Kosovo
- Coordinates: 42.6630°N 21.1569°E
- Owner: Municipality of Pristina
- Operator: FC Prishtina
- Capacity: 13,980
- Surface: Natural grass (until 2024); Hybrid grass (from 2024)
- Scoreboard: LED
- Record attendance: 16,000
- Field size: 105 by 68 metres (114.8 yd × 74.4 yd)
- Public transit: Trafiku Urban bus (Line 1, 3, 4, 6A)

Construction
- Built: 1951–1953
- Opened: 1953; 73 years ago
- Renovated: 2016–2018, 2024
- Closed: 2016–2018, 2024
- Cost: €10.8 million (Note: The 2016–2018 (first) renovation cost €9.50 million, while the second (ongoing) renovation cost €1.3 million.)

Tenants
- FC Prishtina; Kosovar Cup final Kosovo national football teams (selected matches)

The Fadil Vokrri Stadium (Albanian: Stadiumi Fadil Vokrri), previously known as Pristina City Stadium (Albanian: Stadiumi i qytetit të Prishtinës), is a multi-purpose stadium in Pristina, Kosovo, which is used mostly for football matches and is the home ground of FC Prishtina and the Kosovo national football team. The stadium has a capacity of 13,980.

== History ==
The stadium's construction began in 1951 and completed in 1953. It has been used by FC Prishtina since then. On 9 June 2018, the stadium was renamed from Pristina City Stadium to Fadil Vokrri Stadium, following the death of Fadil Vokrri on the same day, who was a football administrator, player and lastly president of Football Federation of Kosovo. The change was announced by Shpend Ahmeti, the Mayor of Pristina.

=== Renovations ===
==== 2016-2018 ====
The renovation of the stadium took place between 2016 and 2018, undergoing significant upgrades to meet UEFA and FIFA standards, allowing it to host international matches. Key aspects of the renovation included an increase in capacity, infrastructure improvements, facilities upgrade and UEFA and FIFA Certification.

==== 2024 ====
Further renovations commenced in March 2024, focusing on extensive updates to the field. The Ministry of Culture, Youth, and Sports (MCYS) and the Football Federation of Kosovo (FFK) have announced that the renovations will include laying a new hybrid turf, upgrading the drainage and irrigation systems, and installing a heating system to ensure the field meets UEFA standards.

This renovation is crucial as Fadil Vokrri Stadium is the only venue in Kosovo licensed by UEFA to host international matches. Due to the heavy usage and adverse weather conditions, the pitch has become unplayable, prompting UEFA to require that Kosovan teams play their home games abroad until the field is restored.

The renovation work started in late March 2024 and is expected to be completed by early July, allowing the stadium to host matches in the next football season.

== Notable events ==
=== International concerts ===
On 17 December 2007 the stadium was filled with 25,000 people for first time after the Kosovo War in a concert by American rapper 50 Cent. On 10 July 2010. The American rapper Snoop Dogg performed in the stadium. This was the second international concert that was held in Pristina after that the 50 Cent concert in 2007 and over 10,000 people attended the concert.

On 15 July 2012. The Albanian rapper Unikkatil held a concert which was the biggest Albanian concert ever held and 25,000 spectators attended the concert to see the "King" of Albanian rap.

=== International matches ===
On 7 September 2002, it hosted for first time after Kosovo War, a friendly match of Kosovo against Albania and finished with a 0–1 win for Albania.

#	Date	Competition	Opponent	Score	Att.	Ref
1	7 September 2002	Friendly	Albania	0–1	15,000	
2	17 February 2010	Friendly	Albania	2–3	10,000	
3	7 September 2014	Friendly	Oman	1–0	10,700	
4	10 October 2015	Friendly	Equatorial Guinea	2–0	6,700	
5	13 November 2015	Friendly	Albania	2–2	16,000	
6	10 September 2018	2018–19 UEFA Nations League D3	Faroe Islands	2–0	12,667	
7	11 October 2018	2018–19 UEFA Nations League D3	Malta	3–1	12,365	
8	20 November 2018	2018–19 UEFA Nations League D3	Azerbaijan	4–0	12,532	
9	21 March 2019	Friendly	Denmark	2–2	13,000	
10	25 March 2019	UEFA Euro 2020 qualifying	Bulgaria	1–1	12,580	
11	7 September 2019	UEFA Euro 2020 qualifying	Czech Republic	2–1	12,678	
12	10 October 2019	Friendly	Gibraltar	1–0	12,000	
13	14 October 2019	UEFA Euro 2020 qualifying	Montenegro	2–0	12,494	
14	17 November 2019	UEFA Euro 2020 qualifying	England	0–4	12,326	—N/a
15	6 September 2020	2020–21 UEFA Nations League C3	Greece	1–2	0	—N/a
16	11 October 2020	2020–21 UEFA Nations League C3	Slovenia	0–1	0	—N/a
17	18 November 2020	2020–21 UEFA Nations League C3	Moldova	1–0	0	—N/a
18	24 March 2021	Friendly	Lithuania	4–0	0	
19	28 March 2021	2022 FIFA World Cup qualification	Sweden	0–3	0	Report (FIFA)
20	1 June 2021	Friendly	San Marino	4–1	0	
22	5 September 2021	2022 FIFA World Cup qualification	Greece	1–1	1,200	Report (FIFA)
23	8 September 2021	2022 FIFA World Cup qualification	Spain	0–2	1,200	Report (FIFA)
24	12 October 2021	2022 FIFA World Cup qualification	Georgia	1–2	3,550	Report (FIFA)
25	10 November 2021	Friendly	Jordan	0–2	1,000	
26	24 March 2022	Friendly	Burkina Faso	5–0		
27	5 June 2022	2022–23 UEFA Nations League C2	Greece	0–1	12,300	
28	9 June 2022	2022–23 UEFA Nations League C2	Northern Ireland	3–2	11,700	
29	27 September 2022	2022–23 UEFA Nations League C2	Cyprus	5–1	10,400	
30	16 November 2022	Friendly	Armenia	2–2	2,000	
31	19 November 2022	Friendly	Faroe Islands	1–1		
32	28 March 2023	UEFA Euro 2024 qualifying	Andorra	1–1	12,600	
33	16 June 2023	UEFA Euro 2024 qualifying	Romania	0–0	11,000	
34	9 September 2023	UEFA Euro 2024 qualifying	Switzerland	2–2	12,700	
35	12 November 2023	UEFA Euro 2024 qualifying	Israel	1–0	5,245	
36	21 November 2023	UEFA Euro 2024 qualifying	Belarus	0–1	5,026	
37	6 September 2024	2024–2025 UEFA Nations League C2	Romania	0–3	12,872	
38	15 October 2024	2024–2025 UEFA Nations League C2	Cyprus	3–0	12,863	
39	18 November 2024	2024–2025 UEFA Nations League C2	Lithuania	1–0	12,856	
40	20 March 2025	2024–25 UEFA Nations League promotion/relegation play-offs	Iceland	2–1	12,857	
41	20 March 2025	Friendly	Armenia	5–2	2,000	
42	20 March 2025	Friendly	Comoros	4–2		
43	8 September 2025	2026 FIFA World Cup qualification	Sweden	2–0	12,887	
44	10 October 2025	2026 FIFA World Cup qualification	Slovenia	0–0	12,268	
45	18 November 2025	2026 FIFA World Cup qualification	Switzerland	1–1	11,215	
46	31 March 2026	2026 FIFA World Cup qualification	Turkey	0–1	12,887	
47	24 September 2026	2026–2027 UEFA Nations League B3	Republic of Ireland	1–0	12,627	
48	4 October 2026	2026–2027 UEFA Nations League B3	Austria	–		
49	14 November 2026	2026–2027 UEFA Nations League B3	Israel	–		

=== European matches ===
The stadium hosted the 2019–20 UEFA Champions League Preliminary Round Tournament.

The clubs involved were:

- (Gibraltar) Lincoln Red Imps
- (Andorra) FC Santa Coloma
- (San Marino) Tre Penne
- (Kosovo) Feronikeli

=== Inauguration ===
On 13 August 2018, after renovation was held a 2018 Kosovar Supercup between the winners of the 2017–18 Football Superleague of Kosovo, Drita and 2017–18 Kosovar Cup, Prishtina. Playing for the first time at the recently refurbished Fadil Vokrri Stadium.

13 August 2018
20:00

Drita	2–1	Prishtina
Fidan Gërbeshi 64' (pen.); Betim Haxhimusa 82'	Report	Gauthier Mankenda 34'

Attendance: 10,000
Referee: Genc Nuza (Kosovo)

Drita	Prishtina

31	(Albania) Edvan Bakaj
5	(Kosovo) Ardian Limani
4	(Kosovo) Fidan Gërbeshi (yellow card) 43'
13	(Kosovo) Liridon Leci (yellow card) 67'
11	(Kosovo) Përparim Livoreka (yellow card) 85'
7	(Kosovo) Endrit Krasniqi (substituted off) 90+4'
25	(Kosovo) Bujar Shabani
27	(Albania) Eri Lamçja (yellow card) 55' (substituted off) 75'
10	(Kosovo) Xhevdet Shabani
93	(Albania) Haxhi Neziraj
22	(Kosovo) Betim Haxhimusa
Substitutions:
1	(Kosovo) Leutrim Rexhepi
99	(Kosovo) Dorant Ramadani
23	(Kosovo) Arbër Shala
8	(Brazil) Edenilson
14	(Kosovo) Fillonit Shaqiri (substituted on) 75'
16	(Kosovo) Albin Krasniqi (substituted on) 90+4'
74	(Kosovo) Zgjim Mustafa
Manager:
(Kosovo) Bekim Isufi

12	(Kosovo) Visar Bekaj
2	(Kosovo) Armend Thaqi
8	(Kosovo) Ahmet Haliti
3	(Ghana) Jamal Arago
13	(Ghana) Abdul Bashiru
21	(Kosovo) Argjend Mustafa
66	(Kosovo) Ergyn Ahmeti
15	(Democratic Republic of the Congo) Gauthier Mankenda
17	(Kosovo) Arbër Hoxha
19	(North Macedonia) Alen Jasharoski (substituted off) 84'
9	(Ghana) Basit Abdul Khalid
Substitutions:
1	(Kosovo) Alban Muqiqi
88	(Kosovo) Përparim Osmani
16	(Kosovo) Donat Hasanaj
5	(Kosovo) Diar Miftaraj
7	(Kosovo) Lorik Boshnjaku (substituted on) 84'
26	(Kosovo) Liridon Fetahaj
22	(Kosovo) Kastriot Selmani
Manager:
(Albania) Mirel Josa
