= Sadat Pajaziti =

Serbian coach (born 1973)

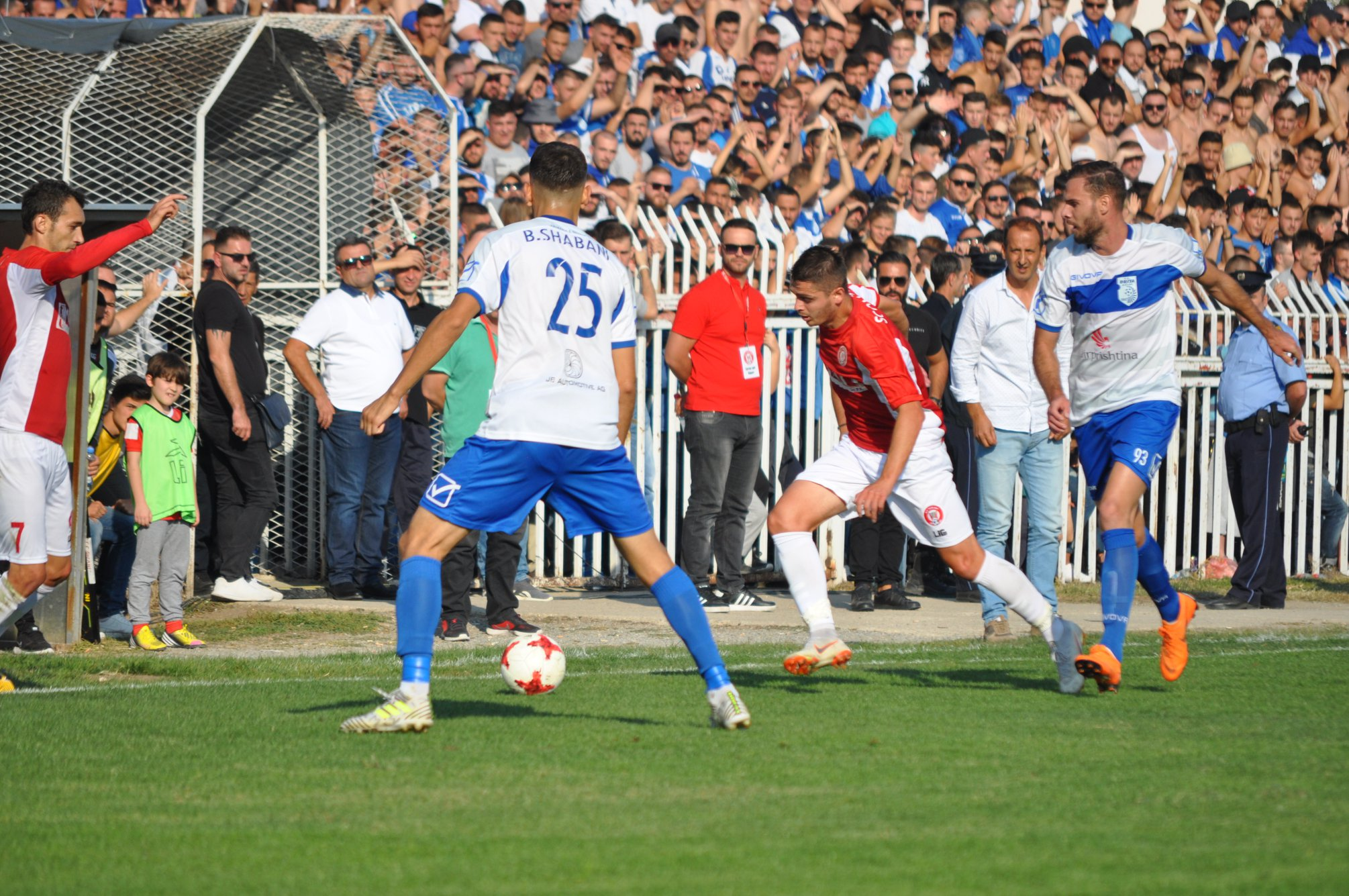
- Pajazit in the background during the Gjilan Derby

Personal information
- Date of birth: 12 June 1973 (age 53)
- Place of birth: Veliki Trnovac, SFR Yugoslavia

Senior career*
Years	Team	Apps	(Gls)
- Tërnoci

Managerial career
- 2011–2013: Tërnoci
- 2013–2014: Teuta (assistant)
- 2015: Gjilani
- 2015: Drita
- 2016–2017: KEK-u
- 2018: Drenica
- 2018–2019: Gjilani
- 2019: Vëllaznimi
- 2019–2021: Dardana
- 2023–2024: Kika
- 2024–2025: Apolonia
- 2025: Kukësi
- * Club domestic league appearances and goals

Sadat Pajaziti (born 12 June 1973) is a Serbian football manager who was most recently in charge of Albanian side Kukësi. He is of Albanian descent.

== Coaching career ==
=== Apolonia (2024–2025) ===
In September 2024, Pajaziti became the head coach of the Kategoria e Parë team Apolonia after Artan Mërgjyshi was relieved of duty.

=== Kukësi (2025–present) ===
On 10 July 2025, he became the head coach of Kukësi of the Kategoria e Parë.
