= Kastriot Rexha =

Kosovar association footballer

Personal information
- Date of birth: 27 September 1988 (age 38)
- Place of birth: Pristina, SFR Yugoslavia
- Height: 1.91 m (6 ft 3 in)
- Position: Centre-forward

Team information
- Current team: Malisheva (assistant)

Senior career*
Years	Team	Apps	(Gls)
2007–2008	2 Korriku	23	(15)
2008–2009	Hysi	4	(0)
2009–2010	KEK-u	20	(9)
2010–2011	Hysi	28	(19)
2011–2012	Trepça '89	16	(17)
2012–2013	Vllaznia	22	(6)
2013–2014	Trepça '89	13	(8)
2014	Prishtina	8	(1)
2014–2017	Besa Pejë	65	(39)
2017–2018	Drita	33	(17)
2018–2020	Feronikeli	48	(34)
2020–2021	Drita	37	(19)
2022–2023	Drenica	6	(0)
Total		323	(184)

Managerial career
- 2023–2025: 2 Korriku (assistant)
- 2025: Prishtina e Re (assistant)
- 2025–: Malisheva (assistant)
- * Club domestic league appearances and goals

Kastriot Rexha (born 27 September 1988) is a Kosovan professional football manager and former player who is the assistant manager of Kosovo Superleague club Malisheva.

== Career ==
Rexha began his career with 2 Korriku in the 2007–08 season, scoring 15 goals in 23 appearances. He later played for Hysi and KEK-u, before returning to Hysi for the 2010–11 season, where he recorded 19 goals in 28 matches. He had two spells with Trepça '89, most notably during the 2011–12 season, when he scored 17 goals in 16 appearances. He also played for Vllaznia and Prishtina, before enjoying his longest continuous period at Besa Pejë between 2014 and 2017, scoring 39 goals in 65 appearances.

He subsequently played for Drita and Feronikeli, registering 17 goals in the 2017–18 season and 34 goals during his time at Feronikeli from 2018 to 2020. He was the top goalscorer of the 2018–19 Football Superleague of Kosovo.

He returned to Drita for the 2020–21 season, scoring 19 goals in 37 matches, and later concluded his playing career with a brief spell at Drenica in the 2022–23 season.

After retiring as a player, he moved into coaching. He served as an assistant coach at 2 Korriku from 2023 to 2025, briefly held the same role at Prishtina e Re in 2025, and has since been working as an assistant coach at Malisheva.
