= Viktor Kuka =

Kosovar footballer

Personal information
- Full name: Viktor Kuka
- Date of birth: 25 June 1990 (age 36)
- Place of birth: Pristina, SFR Yugoslavia
- Height: 1.82 m (6 ft 0 in)
- Position: Defender

Team information
- Current team: Vëllaznimi

Youth career
- Prishtina

Senior career*
Years	Team	Apps	(Gls)
2011–2015	Prishtina		
2015–2016	Teuta Durrës	8	(0)
2016	Llapi	14	(1)
2016–2019	Drita	55	(1)
2019	→ Ferizaj (loan)	11	(0)
2019–2020	Ferizaj	26	(0)
2020–2021	Feronikeli	5	(0)
2021	Malisheva		
2021–2022	Vëllaznimi		
2022	Liria		
2022–2023	Flamurtari		
2023	Drenica	11	(0)
2023–2024	Suhareka		
2024–	Vëllaznimi		
- * Club domestic league appearances and goals as of 22:17, 3 May 2019 (UTC)

Viktor Kuka (born 25 June 1990 in Pristina) is a Kosovar professional footballer who plays as a defender for Vëllaznimi.

== Club career ==
On 24 June 2015, Kuka left Prishtina and signed a two-year contract with Albanian Superliga side Teuta Durrës for an undisclosed fee. He made his début in his team's opening match of the 2015–16 season against Flamurtari Vlorë, playing in the first half before being substituted by Erand Hoxha. Kuka left the team on 4 January of the following year by terminated his contract by mutual consensus, being a free agent in the process. He ended his spell with Teuta by playing 12 matches between league and cup, as he was not able to gain a spot in the starting lineup.

In January 2019, Kuka was loaned out to KF Ferizaj from FC Drita.

== Honours ==
Drita

- Kosovo Superleague: 2017–18
