= Statovci =

Statovci is a surname. Notable people with the surname include:

- Pajtim Statovci (born 1990), Finnish novelist
- Rron Statovci (born 1997), Kosovo Albanian footballer
