= Rron Statovci =

Kosovo Albanian footballer

Personal information
- Date of birth: 18 January 1997 (age 29)
- Place of birth: Pristina, FR Yugoslavia
- Height: 1.76 m (5 ft 9 in)
- Position: Defender

Team information
- Current team: Vushtrria

Senior career*
Years	Team	Apps	(Gls)
–2016	2 Korriku		
2016–2017	Llapi	20	(0)
2017–2018	Vllaznia Pozheran	5	(0)
2018	Flamurtari	15	(0)
2018–2019	Partizani Tirana	0	(0)
2019	Llapi	4	(0)
2019–2020	Trepça '89	23	(0)
2020–2022	2 Korriku		
2022–	Vushtrria		

International career^{‡}
2012	Albania U17	1	(0)
2017	Kosovo U21	2	(0)
- * Club domestic league appearances and goals as of 26 July 2020 ‡ National team caps and goals as of 12 June 2017

Rron Statovci (born 18 January 1997) is a Kosovo Albanian professional footballer who plays as a defender for Albanian club Partizani Tirana.

== Club career ==
=== Llapi ===
On 6 June 2016, Statovci joined Football Superleague of Kosovo side Llapi, on a three-year contract.

=== Vllaznia Pozheran ===
On 22 July 2017, Statovci joined with the newly promoted team of Football Superleague of Kosovo side Vllaznia Pozheran, on a one-year contract.

=== Flamurtari ===
On 5 January 2018, Statovci joined Football Superleague of Kosovo side Flamurtari.

=== Partizani Tirana ===
On 6 July 2018, Statovci joined Albanian Superliga side Partizani Tirana, to replace the departed Arbnor Fejzullahu as the second choice and signed a three-year contract. On 12 September 2018, he made his debut with Partizani Tirana in an Albanian Cup match against Tërbuni Pukë after coming on as a substitute at 57th minute in place of Senad Hysenaj.

=== Return to Llapi ===
On 6 January 2019, Statovci returned to Football Superleague of Kosovo side Llapi.

== International career ==
On 21 March 2017, Statovci received a call-up from Kosovo U21 for a 2019 UEFA European Under-21 Championship qualification match against Republic of Ireland U21 and made his debut after being named in the starting line-up.
