= Albin Krasniqi (footballer, born 2001) =

Kosovan footballer (born 2001)

Personal information
- Date of birth: 3 June 2001 (age 25)
- Place of birth: Kaçanik i Vjetër, Kosovo
- Height: 1.71 m (5 ft 7 in)
- Position: Attacking midfielder

Team information
- Current team: Prishtina (on loan from Kolos Kovalivka)
- Number: 71

Youth career
- –2017: Dinamo Ferizaj
- 2017–2018: Ferizaj

Senior career*
Years	Team	Apps	(Gls)
2018–2023	Drita	57	(1)
2020	→ Ferizaj (loan)	14	(2)
2023	Ferizaj	18	(2)
2023–2025	Prishtina	52	(6)
2025–	Kolos Kovalivka	6	(0)
2026–	→ Prishtina (loan)	22	(6)

International career^{‡}
2018–2019	Kosovo U19	5	(0)
- * Club domestic league appearances and goals as of 7 October 2026 ‡ National team caps and goals as of 19 November 2019

Albin Krasniqi (born 3 June 2001) is a Kosovan professional footballer who plays as an attacking midfielder for Prishtina, on loan from Ukrainian Premier League club Kolos Kovalivka.

== Club career ==
=== Second return to Ferizaj ===
On 16 January 2023, Krasniqi signed a one-and-a-half-year contract with Kosovo Superleague club Ferizaj. His debut with Ferizaj came on 11 February against Gjilani after being named in the starting line-up.

=== Prishtina ===
On 13 June 2023, Krasniqi joined Kosovo Superleague side Prishtina. His debut with Prishtina came two month later against Feronikeli after being named in the starting line-up. He scored the winning goal in the 2024–25 Kosovar Cup final against FC Llapi.

=== Kolos Kovalivka ===
On 4 July 2025, Krasniqi signed a two-year contract with Ukrainian Premier League club Kolos Kovalivka.

== International career ==
On 2 September 2018, Krasniqi was included in Kosovo U19's extended squad for UEFA Euro 2019 qualifications, while a month later he was included in the final squad. His debut with Kosovo U19 came eleven days later against Hungary U19 after being named in the starting line-up.

On 24 December 2019, Krasniqi received a call-up from Kosovo national senior team for the friendly match against Sweden, he was an unused substitute in that match.

== Honours ==
Drita

- Kosovo Superleague: 2019–20
- Kosovar Supercup: 2018

Prishtina

- Kosovar Cup: 2024–25
- Kosovar Supercup: 2023

Individual

- Kosovo Superleague "Star of the Week" Award: 2022–23 (Round 22)
