= 2017–18 Kosovar Cup =

Tournament details
- Country: Kosovo
- Teams: 106

Final positions
- Champions: FC Prishtina
- Runners-up: KF Vëllaznimi

Tournament statistics
- Matches played: 50
- Goals scored: 196 (3.92 per match)

The 2017–18 Kosovar Cup was the football knockout competition of Kosovo in the 2017–18 season.

== First round ==
The draw for the first round was held on 16 October 2017.

Results:

No	Date	Matches
1	18.10.2017	Dardana 1–2 Istogu
2	18.10.2017	KF Xërxa 1–2 KF Përparimi
3	18.10.2017	KF Deçani 4–3 Sharri
4	18.10.2017	KF Uj. Malishevë 4–5 Dardania
5	18.10.2017	KF Leshani w/o KF Dukagjini (N)
6	18.10.2017	KF Ratkoci w/o KF Besa (I)
7	18.10.2017	KF Rinia 6–2 KF Drenoci
8	18.10.2017	Galaksia 10 – 1 KF Luftëtari
9	18.10.2017	KF Ril. e Kosovës 0–3 Behari
10	18.10.2017	KF Dushkaja 2–1 Lepenci
11	18.10.2017	Lugu i Baranit 5–2 Tefik Çanga
12	18.10.2017	KF Vjosa 2–2 Minatori (pso 4–3)
13	18.10.2017	Arbëria 1–1 KF Gryka (a.e.t 3–1)
14	18.10.2017	Ulpiana w/o KF Çeliku

== Second round ==
The draw for the second round was held on 16 October 2017.

Results:

No	Date	Matches
1	01.11.2017	Rahoveci 3–0 Fushë Kosova
2	01.11.2017	Istogu 3–0 Hajvalia
3	01.11.2017	KF Rinia 3–2 KF Përparimi
4	01.11.2017	Vitia 4–2 2 Korriku
5	01.11.2017	KF Ratkoci 7–1 KF Bashkimi (Gj)
6	01.11.2017	Ramiz Sadiku 2–1 Ferizaj
7	01.11.2017	KEK-u 3–0 Bashkimi (K)
8	01.11.2017	Vushtrria 1–0 Onix Banje
9	01.11.2017	Galaksia 4–1 KF Vjosa
10	01.11.2017	Dardania 1–2 Behari
11	01.11.2017	Kosova Prishtinë 2–1 KF Dushkaja
12	01.11.2017	Ulpiana 3–2 Dukagjini
13	01.11.2017	Arbëria w/o KF Deçani
14	01.11.2017	Ballkani w/o Lugu i Baranit
15	01.11.2017	Kika 4–1 KF Dukagjini (N)

== Third round ==
The draw for the third round was held on 7 November 2017.

Results:

No	Date	Matches
1	06.12.2017	Kosova Prishtinë 4–1 Kika
2	07.12.2017	Vllaznia Pozheran 0–1 Llapi
3	06.12.2017	Ramiz Sadiku 1–6 Vushtrria
4	05.12.2017	Arbëria (D) w/o KF Ratkoci
5	06.12.2017	Istogu 2–0 Vitia
6	06.12.2017	Drita 3–0 Feronikeli
7	07.12.2017	Ballkani 1–1 Trepça (a.e.t 3–1)
8	06.12.2017	Besa 0–4 Trepça'89
9	06.12.2017	Ulpiana 1–5 Drenica
10	06.12.2017	Flamurtari 2–3 Prishtina
11	05.12.2017	Gjilani 4–1 KF Rinia
12	06.12.2017	Vëllaznimi w/o Behari
13	06.12.2017	Liria 4–1 KEK-u
14	06.12.2017	Rahoveci w/o Galaksia

== Fourth round ==
The draw for the fourth round was held on 8 December 2017.

No	Date	Matches
1	14.02.2018	Ballkani 0–0 Gjilani (a.e.t 0–1)
2	14.02.2018	Trepça’89 0–2 Llapi
3	14.02.2018	Vëllaznimi 3-1 Rahoveci
4	14.02.2018	Drenica 7–1 Arbëria (D)
5	14.02.2018	Vushtrria 1–1 Liria (pso 7–1)
6	14.02.2018	Istogu 0–1 Drita
7	14.02.2018	Prishtina 4–0 Kosova Prishtinë

== Quarter-finals ==
The draw for the fifth round was held on 16 February 2018. Drenica will qualify direct to Semi-Final.

No	Date	Matches
1	07.03.2018	Llapi 2–2 Prishtina (pso 2–3)
2	06.03.2018	Drita 2–2 Vëllaznimi (pso 5–6)
3	07.03.2018	Gjilani 0–1 Vushtrria

== Semi-finals ==
These matches will be played on 4 and 18 April 2018.

=== First leg ===
4 April 2018	KF Drenica	1-1	KF Vëllaznimi	Skenderaj
14:00	Lorik Rudi 9'	Report	Kreshnik Uka 81'	Stadium: Bajram Aliu Stadium; Referee: Tefik Maloku

4 April 2018	FC Prishtina	1-0	KF Vushtrria	Peć
14:00	Basit Abdul Khalid 19'	Report		Stadium: Shahin Haxhiislami Stadium; Referee: Gramos Shala

=== Second leg ===
18 April 2018	KF Vëllaznimi	0-0 (1-1 agg.)	KF Drenica	Gjakova
15:00		Report		Stadium: City Stadium (Gjakova); Referee: Tefik Maloku

18 April 2018	KF Vushtrria	1-1 (a.e.t.) (1-2 agg.)	FC Prishtina	Vushtrri
15:00	Daut Maxhuni 49'	Report	Basit Abdul Khalid 99'	Stadium: Ferki Aliu Stadium; Referee: Gramos Shala

== Final ==
The final of this year's Kosovo Cup was held on 27 May 2018.

27 May 2018	KF Vëllaznimi	1-1 (a.e.t.) (4-5 p)	FC Prishtina	Mitrovica
16:00	Basit Abdul Khalid 21'	Report	Dardan Rogova 79'	Stadium: Adem Jashari Olympic Stadium; Referee: Fatmir Tahiri
	Penalties
	L. Vula (penalty scored); E. Gashi (penalty scored); J. Dushi (penalty scored); Y. Myrta (penalty missed); B. Krasniqi (penalty scored)		D. Miftaraj (penalty scored); D. Božović (penalty scored); A. Januzi (penalty scored); E. Ahmeti (penalty scored); A. Hoxha (penalty scored)
