= Walid Hamidi =

Algerian footballer (born 1996)

Personal information
- Date of birth: 16 October 1996 (age 30)
- Place of birth: Oran, Algeria
- Height: 1.76 m (5 ft 9 in)
- Position: Forward

Team information
- Current team: Ballkani
- Number: 11

Youth career
- –2015: MC Oran
- 2015–2016: ES Sétif

Senior career*
Years	Team	Apps	(Gls)
2016–2018	MC Oran	6	(0)
2018–2019	ASM Oran	11	(0)
2019–2021	JSM Skikda	23	(1)
2021–2023	Shkupi	61	(6)
2023–	Ballkani	81	(10)
- * Club domestic league appearances and goals as of 22 June 2026

Walid Hamidi (born 16 October 1996) is an Algerian footballer who plays for Ballkani in the Kosovo Superleague.

On 16 May 2017 Hamidi made his senior debut for MC Oran as a second-half substitute against USM Alger.

== Honours ==
(North Macedonia) Macedonian First League:

- Winners : 2021–22

(Kosovo) Superliga e Kosovës

- Winners : 2023–24

(Kosovo) Kupa e Kosovës

- Winners : 2023–24
