= Bekim Isufi =

Kosovan footballer and coach (born 1976)

Personal information
- Full name: Bekim Isufi
- Date of birth: 2 January 1976 (age 50)
- Place of birth: Gjilan, SFR Yugoslavia
- Position: Midfielder

Senior career*
Years	Team	Apps	(Gls)
2002–2003	Prishtina		
2003–2005	Drita		
2006–2007	Flamurtari		

International career
2002	Kosovo	1	(0)

Managerial career
- 2011–2012: Drita
- 2012–2013: Hajvalia
- 2013–2014: Drita
- 2015–2016: Drita
- 2017: Vllaznia Pozheran
- 2017–2018: Drita
- 2019–2020: Ferizaj
- 2021–: Kosovo U21 (assistant)
- 2021: Ballkani
- 2023–24: Kosovo u-20
- 2024–2025: Malisheva
- * Club domestic league appearances and goals

Bekim Isufi (born 2 January 1976) is a Kosovan professional football coach and former player. He last managed KF Malisheva.

== Club career ==
=== Drita ===
Isufi became a famous football player in Kosovo, while playing for Drita in the 2002–03 season and where he had won captain armband for the first time in the Football Superleague of Kosovo.

== International career ==
On 7 September 2002. Isufi made his debut with Kosovo in a friendly match against Albania after coming on as a substitute at 66th minute in place of Xhevdet Llumnica.

== Coaching career ==
=== Fourth term at Drita ===
On 5 November 2017, Isufi became the manager of Drita for a second time, and did the miracle finishing the 2017–18 season as the champion of 29 unbeaten matches and assure participation at the 2018–19 UEFA Champions League preliminary round. On 26 June 2018, Drita beat Andorran side FC Santa Coloma at Victoria Stadium in Gibraltar and became the first Kosovar side to win a UEFA Champions League match.

On 13 September 2018, he resigned from the position of the coach after Drita loss against Llapi and under the direction of Isufi, Drita was the champion of the 2017–18 Football Superleague of Kosovo, won the 2018 Kosovar Supercup and as well made the team as most successful Kosovan team in European competitions since Kosovo was accepted in UEFA.

== Honours ==
=== Manager ===
Drita

- Kosovar League: 2017–18
- Kosovar Supercup: 2018
