= Kaçanik i Vjetër =

Kaçanik i Vjetër: Kaçanik i Vjetër (Albanian); Стари Качаник/Stari Kačanik (Serbian)
- Location in Kosovo
- Location: Kosovo
- District: Ferizaj
- Municipality: Kaçanik

Population (2024)
  - Total: 2,576
- Time zone: UTC+1 (CET)
  - Summer (DST): UTC+2 (CEST)

Kaçanik i Vjetër (Albanian: Kaçanik i Vjetër, Serbian: Стари Качаник/Stari Kačanik) is a village in the municipality of Kaçanik, Kosovo. It is located north of Kaçanik.
