= Xhevdet Shabani =

Kosovar footballer

Personal information
- Date of birth: 10 October 1986 (age 40)
- Place of birth: Kaçanik, SFR Yugoslavia
- Height: 1.82 m (6 ft 0 in)
- Position: Midfielder

Youth career
- 2002–2007: Lepenci

Senior career*
Years	Team	Apps	(Gls)
2007–2009	Lepenci	60	(10)
2009–2010	Ferizaj	25	(4)
2010–2012	Lepenci	46	(12)
2012–2014	Drita	48	(11)
2014	Teuta	14	(3)
2014–2015	Feronikeli	17	(2)
2015–2016	Drita	32	(8)
2016–2017	Besa Pejë	29	(9)
2017–2021	Drita	126	(31)
2021–2022	Prishtina	4	(0)
2022	Malisheva	17	(0)
2022	Feronikeli	0	(0)
- * Club domestic league appearances and goals

Xhevdet Shabani (born 10 October 1986) is a Kosovar former professional footballer who played as a midfielder. He is nicknamed as "Rrapa".

== Club career ==
=== Teuta Durrës ===
In June 2014, Shabani moved for the first time aboard and signed with Albanian Superliga side Teuta Durrës for the 2014–15 season. In an interview, he said that the reason he signed was the project and club's ambition. He commenced the season on 23 August by scoring in the 2–1 loss to Flamurtari Vlorë in the opening week of championship.

Later on 10 September, Shabani scored a brace to lead the team into a 1–5 win over fellow relegation strugglers Elbasani for the first victory of the season. He finished the first part of the season with 14 matches and 3 goals, in addition to 1 cup match, before leaving in January to return to Kosovo.

=== Feronikeli ===
On 11 January 2015, Shabani returned in Kosovo to sign a six-month contract with top flight side Feronikeli. He debuted for the team on 1 March in the matchday 17 against Kosova Vushtrri, receiving a red card in the second half in an eventual 0–2 away win. He scored his maiden Ferronikeli goal on 8 May in the 3–0 home win over Ferizaj to bring the team closer to the title. He finished the second part of the season by appearing in 17 league matches and scoring twice as Ferronikeli won the 2014–15 Football Superleague of Kosovo. Shabani left as a free agent in July 2015 after his contract ran out.

=== Besa Pejë ===
In May 2016, Shabani completed a transfer at Besa Pejë by penning a contract for 2016–17 season. During his first at only season at The Eagles, Shabani scored 9 goals in 29 league appearances as Besa finished 6th in championship.

=== Drita ===
On 16 June 2017, Shabani returned to Drita for a third time by penning a one-year contract, taking the squad number 10 in the process. He made his competitive debut later on 20 August in the opening match of championship against Prishtina, scoring the lone goal of the match. In matchday 5 against Drenica, Shabani produced a Man of the Match performance by assisting the second goal and winning the penalty which lead to the third goal in a 3–0 home win which returned Drita to the winning ways after three consecutive matches. Later on 10 October, he scored his first brace of the season against the leaders of Llapi to bring Drita closer to the lead of championship.

On 6 December, in the 2017–18 Kosovar Cup fourth round against Feronikeli, Shabani scored the opener for a 3–0 win to send Drita through to the next round. His performances throughout the year earned him a spot at Football Superleague of Kosovo Team of the Year 2017. He along with Ardian Limani were the only Drita players to be selected.

Drita won the championship on 20 May 2018 after holding on into a draw in the final matchday versus Prishtina, finishing three points above them and also clinching a spot to 2018–19 UEFA Champions League preliminary round. Shabani was ever-present, playing all matches as starter, netting 10 goals which placed him as the team's second scorer of the 2017–18 season.

On 12 June 2018, it was announced that Drita would play their first Champions League game versus Santa Coloma. The team won the match 2–0, with Shabani scoring Drita's first ever Champions League with a curled shot outside the box to break the deadlock in the 9th minute of extra-time.

== International career ==
On 22 January 2018. Shabani received his first call-up from Kosovo for the friendly match against Azerbaijan. The match however was cancelled two days later, which prolonged his debut.

== Honours ==
=== Club ===
Drita

- Football Superleague of Kosovo: 2017–18

=== Individual ===
- Football Superleague of Kosovo's Team of the Year: 2017
- Kaçanik's sportsperson of the year: 2010
