= Eri Lamçja =

Albanian footballer

Personal information
- Date of birth: 10 March 1994 (age 32)
- Place of birth: Elbasan, Albania
- Height: 1.70 m (5 ft 7 in)
- Position: Striker

Team information
- Current team: Shkumbini

Youth career
- 2010–2012: Elbasani

Senior career*
Years	Team	Apps	(Gls)
2012–2015	Elbasani	61	(11)
2015–2017	Teuta	39	(3)
2017–2018	Luftëtari	45	(5)
2018	Drita	4	(0)
2019	Bylis	8	(3)
2019–2020	Vushtrria	13	(1)
2020	Besa Kavajë	4	(0)
2020–	Shkumbini		
- * Club domestic league appearances and goals as of 1 November 2020

Eri Lamçja (born 10 March 1994) is an Albanian professional footballer who plays as a striker for KF Shkumbini in the Kategoria e Dytë.

== Club career ==
Lamçja left Elbasani after a poor 2014–15 season, which saw the club being relegated after finishing the league in the last position.

On 3 December 2016, he left Teuta Durrës by terminating his contract by mutual consent. The club staff was not happy with his performance during the first part of the 2016–17 season, and Lamçja himself was not happy with the playing time he was given during that time, which lead to the divorce.

On 26 December 2016, Lamçja joined Luftëtari Gjirokastër by signing until December 2019. On 15 May 2017, during the league match against his former side Teuta, Lamçja was involved in a brawl moments after Teuta equalized in the 97th minute. Four days later, he was banned six matches by Commissary Committee of AFA for unsportsmanlike conduct. One the same day, the club issued a statement, citing Lamçja's ban as "scandal", adding that the club will appeal the decision.

He scored his first goals of 2017–18 season in form of a brace in the 5–0 thrashing of Partizani Tirana on 17 December 2017. It was Partizani's biggest loss since returning in top flight in 2013 and Lamçja's first career brace. It was also his first goal since April 2017, ending a barren run of 22 matches in all competitions without scoring. He concluded the 2017–18 season by amassing 30 league appearances and scored 3 goals, with Luftëtari qualifying UEFA Europa League for the first time in history. He left the club afterwards after his contract run out and the parties didn't agree for the financial part.

On 20 July 2018, Lamçja left Albanian football and joined Football Superleague of Kosovo side Drita for the 2018–19 season. He made two appearances as substitute for the team in 2018–19 UEFA Europa League Champions Path second qualifying round against F91 Dudelange. Drita was knocked-out 3–2 on aggregate by the Luxembourgish side. On 13 August, he won the 2018 Kosovar Supercup as Drita won 2–1 against Prishtina at Fadil Vokrri Stadium. On 25 December 2018, Drita announced to have terminate the contract with Lamçja, who failed to adapt and impress during his short tenure at Gjilani side.

On 12 January 2018, Lamçja was presented as the new player of Bylis Ballsh on a deal until the end of the campaign.

After spells at KF Vushtrria and KF Besa Kavajë, Lamçja moved to KF Shkumbini in the Kategoria e Dytë in the summer 2020.

== Career statistics ==
As of 11 October 2018

Club statistics
Club	Season	League			Cup		Europe		Total	
Club	Season	Division	Apps	Goals	Apps	Goals	Apps	Goals	Apps	Goals
Elbasani	2012–13	Albanian First Division	19	4	0	0	—		19	4
Elbasani	2013–14	Albanian First Division	18	3	0	0	—		18	3
Elbasani	2014–15	Albanian Superliga	24	4	4	1	—		28	5
Elbasani	Total		61	11	4	1	—		65	12
Teuta Durrës	2015–16	Albanian Superliga	31	3	3	1	—		34	4
Teuta Durrës	2016–17	Albanian Superliga	8	0	3	0	1 (Note: All appearance(s) in UEFA Europa League)	0	12	0
Teuta Durrës	Total		39	3	6	1	1	0	46	4
Luftëtari Gjirokastër	2016–17	Albanian Superliga	15	2	0	0	—		15	2
Luftëtari Gjirokastër	2017–18	Albanian Superliga	30	3	3	0	—		33	3
Luftëtari Gjirokastër	Total		45	5	3	0	—		48	5
Drita	2018–19	Football Superleague of Kosovo	4	0	1 (Note: One appearance in Kosovar Supercup)	0	2	0	7	0
Bylis Ballsh	2018–19	Albanian First Division	0	0	0	0	—		0	0
Career total			149	19	13	2	3	0	165	21

== Honours ==
Elbasani

- Albanian First Division: 2013–14

Drita

- Kosovar Supercup: 2018
