= Arbër Shala =

Kosovan footballer

Personal information
- Full name: Arbër Shala
- Date of birth: 23 December 1991 (age 34)
- Place of birth: Zočište, Orahovac, Kosovo, SFR Yugoslavia
- Position: Left back

Team information
- Current team: Istogu
- Number: 3

Senior career*
Years	Team	Apps	(Gls)
2010–2014	Gjilani	66	(2)
2014–2015	Hajvalia	20	(1)
2015–2016	Gjilani	25	(1)
2016–2018	Laçi	41	(0)
2018–2019	Drita	7	(1)
2019	→ Kamza (loan)	5	(0)
2019	Liria Prizren	2	(0)
2020	Dukagjini	14	(2)
2020–2021	Renova	13	(1)
2021	Ballkani	4	(1)
2021–2025	Dukagjini	96	(9)
2025–2026	Drenica	13	(0)
2026	Vëllaznimi Gjakovë		
2026–	Istogu	0	(0)
- * Club domestic league appearances and goals as of 29 May 2026

Arbër Shala (born 23 December 1991) is a Kosovan professional footballer who plays as a left back for Dukagjini.

== Club career ==
=== Laçi ===
On 4 August 2016, Shala joined Albanian club Laçi, taking squad number 3 for the 2016–17 season. He made his competitive debut on 7 September in the opening matchday against Korabi Peshkopi which ended in a goalless draw. He quickly established himself in the starting lineup, playing at the back. On 1 April of the following year, during the 2–0 away loss to Teuta Durrës in the matchday 27, Shala was sent-off after a bad tackle on Faisal Bangal. Five days later, he was later suspended for 6 matches for his behaviour towards the match official by the Disciplinary Committee of AFA. He finished his first full season in Albania by making 34 appearances, including 29 in league, collecting 2080 minutes as Laçi secured a spot in the top flight for another season.

The 2017–18 season was less successful for Shala, as he lost the place in the starting lineup, managing to play only 12 league matches, only 7 as starter, collecting 636 minutes as Laçi finished 4th to return to Europa League qualifying rounds once again. He scored his first goal for Laçi on 13 September in the first leg of cup first round versus Sopoti Librazhd; the match finished in a shock result, with Laçi winning 12–0. On 31 May 2018, Shala's contract run out and the parties decided not to continue their cooperation, ending his spell with 41 league matches.

=== Drita ===
On 7 June 2018, Shala joined fellow Football Superleague of Kosovo side and reigning champions Drita, signing a two-year contract. On 8 January 2019, Shala was loaned out to Albanian club FC Kamza.

=== Liria Prizren ===
On 27 July 2019 Liria Prizren announced, that they had signed Shala. He moved on to Dukagjini in January 2020.

=== Renova ===
In mid-August 2020, 28-year old Shala moved to KF Renova in North Macedonia.

== Career statistics ==
As of 14 March 2018

Club statistics
Club	Season	League			Cup		Europe		Total	
Club	Season	Division	Apps	Goals	Apps	Goals	Apps	Goals	Apps	Goals
Laçi	2016–17	Albanian Superliga	29	0	5	0	—		12	4
Laçi	2017–18	Albanian Superliga	12	0	3	1	—		37	18
Laçi	Total		41	0	8	1	—		49	1
Career total			41	0	8	1	—		49	1
