= Haxhi Neziraj =

Swiss-born Albanian footballer

Personal information
- Full name: Haxhi Neziraj
- Date of birth: 16 March 1993 (age 33)
- Place of birth: Lucerne, Switzerland
- Height: 1.87 m (6 ft 2 in)
- Position: Attacking midfielder

Team information
- Current team: SC Buochs

Youth career
- 2010–2013: Luzern

Senior career*
Years	Team	Apps	(Gls)
2013–2016	Luzern	11	(1)
2014–2015	→ Wohlen (loan)	16	(0)
2015–2016	→ Schaffhausen (loan)	27	(4)
2017–2018	Flamurtari Vlorë	21	(1)
2018–2019	Drita	41	(6)
2019	Feronikeli	3	(4)
2021–	SC Buochs	0	(0)

International career
2013	Albania U21	5	(0)
- * Club domestic league appearances and goals as of 2 December 2019

Haxhi Neziraj (born 16 March 1993) is an Albanian professional footballer who plays as an attacking midfielder for SC Buochs.

== Club career ==
=== Flamurtari Vlorë ===
On 30 January 2017. Neziraj joined Albanian Superliga side Flamurtari Vlorë. On 1 February 2017, he made his debut with Flamurtari Vlorë in the fourth round of 2016–17 Albanian Cup against Besëlidhja Lezhë after coming on as a substitute at 29th minute in place of injured Ardit Shehaj.

=== Drita ===
On 31 January 2018. Neziraj signed to Football Superleague of Kosovo side Drita. On 14 February 2018, he made his debut with Drita in the quarter-finals of 2017–18 Kosovar Cup against Istogu and scoring his side's only goal during a 0–1 away win.

== International career ==
On 7 June 2013. Neziraj made his debut with Albania U21 in a 2015 UEFA European Under-21 Championship qualification match against Hungary U21 after being named in the starting line-up.

== Personal life ==
Neziraj was born in Lucerne, Switzerland from Kosovo Albanian parents from Gjakova.
