= Basit Abdul Khalid =

Ghanaian footballer (born 1996)

Personal information
- Full name: Basit Abdul Khalid
- Date of birth: 10 August 1996 (age 30)
- Place of birth: Accra, Ghana
- Height: 1.87 m (6 ft 2 in)
- Position: Centre-forward

Team information
- Current team: Dukagjini
- Number: 20

Youth career
- –2016: Dreams

Senior career*
Years	Team	Apps	(Gls)
2016–2019	Prishtina	50	(13)
2019–2020	Teuta Durrës	9	(0)
2020–2021	Makedonija G.P.	14	(8)
2021	Espérance Tunis	13	(2)
2021–2022	Sheriff Tiraspol	16	(5)
2022	Al-Tadamon		
2023	Makedonija G.P.	12	(1)
2024	Al Ittihad Misurata	5	(0)
2025–	Dukagjini	24	(1)
- * Club domestic league appearances and goals as of 22 June 2026

Basit Abdul Khalid (born 10 August 1996) is a Ghanaian professional footballer who plays as a centre-forward for Dukagjini in Kosovo.

== Club career ==
=== Prishtina ===
==== 2015–16 season ====
In March 2016, Khalid joined Prishtina of Football Superleague of Kosovo by signing a contract until June 2018. During the remaining 2015–16 season, he scored twice in 10 matches as Prishtina finished 8th in the championship.

==== 2016–17 season ====
During the 2016–17 season, he bagged 13 goals in 35 league appearances, being top scorer of the team. He also scored his first career hat-trick on 5 April 2017 in matchday 24 against Drita which finished 1–3 for Khalid's side. Prishtina also reached Kosovar Cup final where they defeated Drita 2–1 thanks to Khalid brace.

==== 2017–18 season ====
The triumph in cup meant that Prishtina has qualified to UEFA Europa League for the first time in history. They were shorted against Sweden's IFK Norrköping. Khalid played in both matches unable to deliver as Prishtina was eliminated 6–0 on aggregate. In October 2017, after dealing for a long time with a meniscus injury, Khalid undergo surgery time and was reported that he will be back in January of the following year.

=== Teuta Durrës ===
In August 2019, Abdul Khalid completed a transfer to Albanian Superliga side Teuta Durrës.

=== Esperance de Tunis ===
Basit joined Espérance on 25 January 2021 for a two-and-a-half-year contract but this contract was terminated by mutual consent on 29 July 2021.

=== Sheriff Tiraspol ===
On 17 September 2021, he signed for Moldovan National Division club Sheriff Tiraspol.

== Career statistics ==
As of 6 October 2017

Club	Season	League			Cup		Europe		Total	
Club	Season	Division	Apps	Goals	Apps	Goals	Apps	Goals	Apps	Goals
Prishtina	2015–16	Football Superleague of Kosovo	10	2	0	0	—		10	2
Prishtina	2016–17	Football Superleague of Kosovo	35	13	1	2	—		37	15
Prishtina	2017–18	Football Superleague of Kosovo	6	1	0	0	2 (Note: All appearance(s) in UEFA Europa League)	0	8	1
Prishtina	Total		51	16	1	2	2	0	54	18
Career total			51	16	1	2	2	0	54	18

== Honours ==
Prishtina

- Kosovar Cup: 2017–18
- Kosovar Supercup: 2016

ES Tunis

- Tunisian Ligue Professionnelle 1: 2020–21
