= KF Kika =

Football club in Kosovo

- Full name: Klub Futbollistik Kika
- Founded: 1974; 52 years ago
- Ground: Kika Stadium
- Capacity: 1,500
- League: Kosovo First League
- 2024–25: Kosovo First League – Group B, 7th of 10

KF Kika (Albanian: Klubi Futbollistik Kika) is a professional football club from Kosovo which competes in the First League. The club is based in Hogosht. Their home ground is the Kika Stadium which has a seating capacity of 500. Due to the COVID-19 pandemic, the second league got canceled which meant they were crowned champions.

== Honours ==
- Kosovar Superliga
  - Runners-up (1): 1992–1993

== Notable players ==
- (Kosovo) Lirim Kastrati
- (Kosovo) Sami Sermaxhaj

== See also ==
- List of football clubs in Kosovo
