= Liridon Leci =

Kosovan footballer (born 1985)

Personal information
- Full name: Liridon Ilaz Leci
- Date of birth: 11 February 1985 (age 41)
- Place of birth: Pristina, SFR Yugoslavia
- Height: 1.86 m (6 ft 1 in)
- Position: Left-back

Team information
- Current team: Liria (manager)

Youth career
- –1997: Traktori Barilevë
- 1997–1999: Kosova Prishtinë
- 1999–2003: Prishtina

Senior career*
Years	Team	Apps	(Gls)
2003–2005	Prishtina	30	(1)
2005–2007	Elbasani	25	(1)
2007–2008	Flamurtari Vlorë	12	(0)
2008–2010	Besa Kavajë	53	(5)
2010–2011	Vllaznia Shkodër	12	(0)
2011–2012	Kastrioti	13	(0)
2012–2013	Kalmar	0	(0)
2013	Landskrona BoIS	15	(1)
2014–2016	Hajvalia	26	(8)
2016–2017	Prishtina	25	(3)
2017–2020	Drita	67	(4)
2020–2021	Llapi	2	(0)
Total		280	(23)

International career
2010	Kosovo	1	(0)

Managerial career
- 2022–2023: Flamurtari (youth)
- 2023–2024: Flamurtari
- 2024: Ferizaj U21
- 2025: Rahoveci
- 2025–: Liria
- * Club domestic league appearances and goals

Liridon Ilaz Leci (born 11 February 1985) is a Kosovan professional football manager and former player who is the manager of Kosovo First League club Liria.

== Club career ==
=== Match fixing scandal ===
On 7 October 2014, Swedish investigative journalism television program Uppdrag granskning published an interview with Leci, filmed with a hidden camera. In the interview, he admits his involvement in match fixing. On the recording, he blatantly speaks about his contacts in the second tier league Superettan and particularly Sweden's highest football league, Allsvenskan.

=== Return to Prishtina ===
On 14 June 2016, Leci joined Football Superleague of Kosovo side Prishtina. His performances throughout the year earned him a spot at 2017 Football Superleague of Kosovo's Team of the Year and he along with Armend Dallku were the only Prishtina players to be selected.

On 30 April 2017, Leci was arrested from Kosovo Police during the match against Besa Pejë in Peja after he entered the field even though he was punished with a red card, this happened after the injury of goalkeeper Alban Muqiqi and for this action, except that he was sentenced by the police was also sentenced by the Football Federation of Kosovo with two non-match games.

=== Drita ===
On 19 July 2017, Leci joined Football Superleague of Kosovo side Drita, along with his teammate Endrit Krasniqi.

== International career ==
On 17 February 2010, Leci made his debut with Kosovo in a friendly match against Albania after coming on as a substitute.

== Managerial career ==
=== Liria ===
On 25 September 2025, Leci was appointed as the head coach of Liria.

== Personal life ==
Leci was born in Pristina, SFR Yugoslavia from Kosovo Albanian parents. On 19 September 2013, he obtained Albanian passport.
