= Ardian Limani =

Kosovar professional footballer (born 1993)

Personal information
- Full name: Ardian Limani
- Date of birth: 18 November 1993 (age 32)
- Place of birth: Gjilan, FR Yugoslavia (now Kosovo)
- Height: 1.83 m (6 ft 0 in)
- Position: Centre-back

Team information
- Current team: Prishtina
- Number: 4

Youth career
- –2013: Drita

Senior career*
Years	Team	Apps	(Gls)
2013–2016	Drita	59	(0)
2016–2017	Feronikeli	11	(1)
2017–2023	Drita	194	(7)
2023–2024	Shkëndija	18	(0)
2024–	Prishtina	64	(8)
- * Club domestic league appearances and goals as of 22 June 2026

Ardian Limani (born 18 November 1993) is a Kosovar professional footballer who plays as a centre-back for Football Superleague of Kosovo club Prishtina

== Club career ==
=== Drita ===
Born in Gjilan, in modern-day Kosovo, with a family originally from the city of Gjilan. Limani played with Drita in the Football Superleague of Kosovo

=== Feronikeli ===
Limani was transferred to Feronikeli in the summer of 2016. He debuted in the Super League of Kosovo, his opponent was Besa Pejë.

Stayed one year and was declared champion in Football Superleague of Kosovo.

=== Drita ===
He returned in 2017 to FC Drita as captain, where he was declared the champion of Kosovo twice and stayed for six years.

=== Shkëndija ===
Limani was transferred to the Albanian team from Macedonia Shkëndija in July 2023, where he stayed for six months

=== Prishtina ===
He moved to Pristina in January 2024 and made his debut in the first match against current Kosovo champions Ballkani in the Kosovo Super Cup, where they won 2–1.
