= Kosovar Cup =

- Organiser(s): Football Federation of Kosovo
- Founded: 1991; 35 years ago
- Region: Kosovo (Europe)
- Teams: 106
- Qualifier for: UEFA Europa League (2017–2020, 2024–); UEFA Europa Conference League (2021–2024)
- Current champions: Dukagjini (1st title)
- Most championships: Prishtina (9th title)
- Broadcaster(s): Artmotion, Klan Kosova
- 2026–27 Kosovar Cup

The Kosovar Cup (Albanian: Kupa e Kosovës) is the major football national cup tournament in Kosovo. It was established in 1991, and is organized by the Football Federation of Kosovo. Prishtina are the current holders, who won their second Kosovar Cup against Gjilani at the 2022–23 Kosovar Cup final held at the Fadil Vokrri Stadium.

== Cup finals ==
=== Independent football association ===
- 1991–92: Trepça
- 1992–93: Flamurtari 1–0 Trepça
- 1993–94: Prishtina 2–1 Vëllaznimi
- 1994–95: Prishtina 1–0 Dukagjini
- 1995–96: Flamurtari 2–1 Dukagjini
- 1996–97: 2 Korriku w/o Gjilani
- 1997–98: tournament not held
- 1998–99: tournament not held

=== Reestablished after establishment of UNMIK ===
- 1999–00 Gjilani 1-0 Besiana
- 2000–01 Drita 1-1 Gjilani [aet, 5-4 pen]
- 2001–02 Besiana 2–1 Gjilani
- 2002–03 KEK 3–1 Prishtina
- 2003–04 Kosova Prishtinë 1–0 Besa Pejë
- 2004–05 Besa Pejë 3–2 KEK
- 2005–06 Prishtina 1–1 Drenica [aet, 5-4 pen]
- 2006–07 Liria 0–0 Flamurtari [aet, 3-0 pen]
- 2007–08 Vëllaznimi 2–0 Trepça'89

=== After the declaration of independence ===
- 2008–09 Hysi 2–1 Prishtina
- 2009–10 Liria 2–1 Vëllaznimi
- 2010–11 Prishtina 1–2 Besa Pejë
- 2011–12 Trepça'89 3–0 Ferizaj
- 2012–13 Prishtina 1–1 Ferizaj [aet, 4–3 pen]
- 2013–14 Hajvalia 1–2 Feronikeli
- 2014–15 Feronikeli 1-1 Trepça'89 [aet, 5-4 pen]
- 2015–16 Prishtina 2–1 Drita

=== After UEFA recognition ===
- 2016–17: Llapi 1–1 Besa [aet, 2–4 pen]
- 2017–18: Vëllaznimi 1–1 Prishtina [aet, 4–5 pen]
- 2018–19: Feronikeli 5–1 Trepça'89
- 2019–20: Prishtina 1–0 Ballkani
- 2020–21: Dukagjini 1–1 Llapi [aet, 3–4 pen]
- 2021–22: Llapi 2–1 Drita
- 2022–23: Gjilani 0–2 Prishtina
- 2023–24: Ballkani 2–2 Prishtina [aet, 4–2 pen]
- 2024–25: Llapi 0–1 Prishtina
- 2025-26: Ferizaj 1–2 Dukagjini

== Performance by club ==
Club	Winners	Winning seasons
Prishtina	9	1993–94, 1994–95, 2005–06, 2012–13, 2015–16, 2017–18, 2019–20, 2022–23, 2024–25
Besa	3	2004–05, 2010–11, 2016–17
Feronikeli	3	2013–14, 2014–15, 2018–19
Liria	2	2006–07, 2009–10
Flamurtari	2	1992–93, 1995–96
Llapi	2	2020–21, 2021–22
Trepça	1	1991–92
2 Korriku	1	1996–97
Gjilani	1	1999–00
Drita	1	2000–01
Besiana	1	2001–02
KEK	1	2002–03
Kosova Prishtinë	1	2003–04
Vëllaznimi	1	2007–08
Hysi	1	2008–09
Trepça'89	1	2011–12
Ballkani	1	2023–24
