= FC 2 Korriku =

Football club in Kosovo

- Full name: Klubi Futbollistik 2 Korriku
- Founded: 1957; 69 years ago
- Ground: Fusha Sportive 2 Korriku
- Capacity: 1,000
- President: Rexhep Baholli
- Manager: Besim Ademi
- League: Kosovo First League
- 2024–25: Kosovo First League – Group B, 6th of 10
- Website: http://www.2korriku.com
Home colours	Away colours

FC 2 Korriku (Albanian: Klubi Futbollistik 2 Korriku Prishtinë) is a professional football club based in the city of Pristina, Kosovo. The club competes in the second tier of football in Kosovo, Liga e Parë.

== History ==
The club was founded in 1957 as Proleteri. In 1990, the club's name was changed to 2 Korriku. The club's name are translated as «July 2» and refers to the date of the proclamation of the First Republic of Kosovo. KF 2 Korriku won the Kosovo Cup in 1996. The club has the most popular football school in Kosovo. Since 1990, this school was the generator of extrodinary talents and in the Kosovo Superleague, almost every club has players from this school. Some famous players that went through the ranks of KF 2 Korriku are Etrit Berisha, Ardian Ismajli and Australian/Albanian Labinot Haliti.

== Stadium ==
The club play their home games at the Fusha Sportive 2 Korriku in Pristina.

== Players ==
=== Current squad ===
Note: Flags indicate national team as defined under FIFA eligibility rules; some limited exceptions apply. Players may hold more than one non-FIFA nationality.

No.	Pos.	Nation	Player
5	DF	KOS	Abit Salihu
6	DF	KOS	Arian Lahu
7	FW	KOS	Florent Molliqaj
8	MF	KOS	Andi Oruqi (Captain)
9	FW	KOS	Albin Prapashtica
10	MF	KOS	Endrit Baholli
11	DF	KOS	Jehon Stublla
12	GK	KOS	Amir Govori
13	MF	KOS	Qendrim Sejdiu
14	MF	KOS	Argjend Xhafa
15	FW	KOS	Erik Stublla

No.	Pos.	Nation	Player
17	MF	KOS	Arbnor Shala
20	MF	KOS	Besmir Osmani
27	GK	KOS	Fatmir Muqiqi
30	MF	USA	Ilirian Gjata
33	DF	KOS	Landrit Rama
77	FW	KOS	Adonis Aliu
99	FW	KOS	Urim Statovci

== European Record ==
Season	Team	Round	Opponent	Home	Away	Agg.
2024–25	2 Korriku	1R	(Albania) Bylis	2–1	1–2	4–2
2024–25	2 Korriku	2R	(Republic of Ireland) UCD	2–1	1–3	5–1
2024–25	2 Korriku	3R	(Ukraine) Dynamo Kyiv	1–4	5–0	1–9
2025–26	2 Korriku	2R	(Scotland) Hibernian	0-4	1-0	1–4

Competition	P	W	D	L	GF	GA	GD	Win %
UEFA Youth League	8	5	0	3	11	16	−5	62.50

=== By country ===
Opponents	Pld	W	D	L	GF	GA	GD
Ireland	2	2	0	0	5	1	+4
Albania	2	2	0	0	4	2	+2
Scotland	2	1	0	1	1	4	−3
Ukraine	2	0	0	2	1	9	−8

== Affiliated clubs ==
- (Turkey) Beşiktaş J.K. (2021–present)
