= FC KEK-u =

Football club in Kosovo

KEK
- Full name: Football Club of the Kosovo Energy Corporation
- Nickname: Elektricistët (The Electricians)
- Founded: 1928; 98 years ago as FK Obilić, later as RMHK Kosovo
- Ground: Agron Rama Stadium
- Capacity: 10,000
- Chairman: Besnik Mjeku
- Manager: Afrim Visoka
- League: Raiffeisen First League
- 2025-26: 10
| Home colours | Away colours |

Football Club of the Kosovo Energy Corporation (Albanian: Klubi Futbollistik Korporata Energjetike e Kosovës), commonly known as KEK-u, is a football club based in Obiliq, Kosovo. The club currently competes in the Liga e Parë.

== History ==
With a long history dating back to 1928, the club has undergone several name and organizational changes over the years. Initially known as KF Obiliq, then as KF KXEKM Kosova and KF Elektroekonomia, it adopted its current name, FC KEK (Kosovo Energy Corporation), in 1999. The club has been part of important events in Kosovan football, achieving successes in both league and cup competitions.

During the years of former Yugoslavia, FC Obiliq made its mark in Kosovan football history by becoming the champion of the Kosovo League in 1966–67 and 1971–72. Another period of success came under the name KF KXEKM Kosova, when they won the Kosovo League in the 1975–76 season.

After the war, football clubs in Kosovo underwent significant changes. FC KEK began its journey in the Second League, eventually earning promotion to the First League in the 2002–03 season. They achieved success that season, winning both the Kosovo Cup and the Supercup.

Over the years, FC KEK has continued to perform respectably in the First League and the Kosovo Superleague. In the 2017–18 season, they were crowned champions of the First League and returned to the Superleague. However, after facing challenges, they were relegated back to the First League in 2018–19.

In the 2023–24 season, FC KEK was crowned champion of the Second League, achieving an outstanding performance by remaining unbeaten in 30 matches.

FC KEK is currently competing in the Raiffeisen First League for the 2025–26 season, continuing to participate at the second tier of football in Kosovo.

=== League history ===
The club was founded in 1928 and for most of the time played in the second tier, the First Football League of Kosovo, having reached promotion to Kosovo highest level in 2018. The club was known as Obilić, RMHK Kosovo and Elektroprivreda when playing in the Yugoslav football league system. KEK won the Kosovar Cup and the Kosovar Super Cup in 2003. FC KEK won the Liga e Dytë in 2024.
