= KF Flamurtari =

Football club in Kosovo

Flamurtari
- Full name: Klubi Futbollistik Flamurtari
- Nicknames: Armata Kuq e Zi (Red and Black Army)
- Founded: August 22, 1968; 58 years ago
- Ground: Xhemail Ibishi Stadium
- Capacity: 5,000
- Coordinates: 42°40′29″N 21°10′16″E
- Manager: Liridon Leci
- League: Kosovo Second League
- 2025–26: Kosovo Second League, 8th of 18
- Website: kfflamurtari.com
Home colours	Away colours

KF Flamurtari is a professional football club based in Pristina, Kosovo. It is the second biggest team in Prishtina.

== History ==
It was founded in 1968 by four friends, brothers Rizah and Ismet Ismaili, and brothers Ibrahim and Fehmi Prapashtica.

The club's name was appointed by Agim Sedllari.

== Competition Performances ==
Flamurtari were finalists of the Kosovar Cup for the 2006–07 season, losing 3–0 on penalties to Liria in the final held in Pristina.

From 1992 to 1999, Flamurtari won the Kosovar Cup twice.

== Players ==
=== Current squad ===
As of 19 September 2022

Note: Flags indicate national team as defined under FIFA eligibility rules; some limited exceptions apply. Players may hold more than one non-FIFA nationality.

No.	Pos.	Nation	Player
—	GK	KOS	Landi Vokrri
—	GK	KOS	Leurat Tahiri
—	DF	KOS	Eldi Sejdiu
—	DF	KOS	Bekim Vitija
—	DF	KOS	Luan Maloku
—	DF	KOS	Butrint Alshiqi
—	DF	KOS	Meridon Haradini
—	DF	KOS	Rrezon Pllana
—	DF	KOS	Valdrin Rakovica
—	DF	KOS	Florent Rexhepi
—	MF	KOS	Endrit Munishi
—	MF	KOS	Rion Reqica
—	MF	KOS	Ylber Toperlaku
—	MF	KOS	Donat Cikaj

No.	Pos.	Nation	Player
—	FW	KOS	Rron Prapashtica (captain)
—	FW	KOS	Lirjon Latifi
—	FW	KOS	Adem Ahmeti
—	FW	KOS	Aldin Koprani
—	FW	KOS	Andi Dragusha
—	FW	KOS	Lirim Osmani

=== Notable former players ===
This is a list of KF Flamurtari players with senior national team appearances:

Albania and Kosovo

- Youth
1. (Albania) Liridon Latifi
2. (Kosovo) Edon Zhegrova
- Senior
1. (Kosovo) Blendi Baftiu
2. (Kosovo) Ismet Munishi
3. (Kosovo) Kushtrim Mushica
4. (Kosovo) Afrim Tovërlani

Other countries

1. (Niger) Adamou Moussa

== Historical list of coaches ==
- (Kosovo) Luan Prekazi (1996)
- (Kosovo) Skender Konjuhi ( - 2022)
- (Kosovo) Agon Krasniqi ( - 2021)
