= KF Drenica =

Association football club in Kosovo

Drenica
- Full name: KF Drenica
- Nicknames: Kuq e Zinjtë (The Red and Blacks); Shqiponjat e Zeza (Black Eagles)
- Short name: KFD, FCD
- Founded: 1958; 68 years ago
- Ground: Bajram Aliu Stadium
- Capacity: 4,000
- Owner: Municipality of Skenderaj
- Chairman: Halim Bajraktari
- Manager: Jeton Mehmeti
- League: Kosovo Superleague
- 2025–26: Kosovo Superleague, 6th of 10
Home colours	Away colours

KF Drenica (Albanian: Klubi Futbollistik Drenica), commonly known as Drenica, is a professional football club based in Skënderaj, Kosovo. The club plays in the Kosovo Superleague, which is the top tier of football in the country.

== History ==
KF Drenica was founded in 1958 in the city of Skenderaj and is considered one of the oldest and most well-known football clubs in Kosovo. During Yugoslav times, the club was known as FK Budućnost (Albanian: KF Buduqnosti or KF Ardhmëria). Since its establishment, the club has proudly represented the Drenica region, wearing the red and black colors and the symbol of the black double-headed eagle as an expression of local identity and resilience.

Over the following decades, KF Drenica went through various stages of development, facing challenges and achieving important milestones. From its modest beginnings, the club gradually became part of the national football scene in Kosovo, with one of its most notable achievements being reaching the 2005–06 Kosovar Cup final, which marked a turning point at the national level despite not winning the trophy.

After the end of the Kosovo War, KF Drenica became a regular participant in the Kosovo Superleague, except for the 2022–23 and 2023–24 seasons when the club was relegated to the Kosovo First League. However, in the 2024–25 season, following strong organization and continuous commitment, Drenica won the First League title and secured promotion back to the Superleague, reaffirming its ambition to remain part of the elite of Kosovar football.

== Players ==
=== Current squad ===
As of 1 September 2026

Note: Flags indicate national team as defined under FIFA eligibility rules; some limited exceptions apply. Players may hold more than one non-FIFA nationality.

No.	Pos.	Nation	Player
1	GK	KOS	Arion Ymeri
2	DF	KOS	Andi Veliqi
4	MF	KOS	Endrit Shala
5	DF	ALB	Harallamb Qaqi
7	FW	KOS	Osman Mëziu
8	MF	KOS	Besfort Dervishaj
9	FW	KOS	Egzon Fazliu
10	MF	KOS	Genc Hamiti (vice-captain)
11	FW	KOS	Aurel Limani
12	GK	KOS	Amrush Bujupi
14	MF	KOS	Alush Gavazaj
17	DF	KOS	Shkëlzen Lushtaku (captain)
19	FW	KOS	Donat Mehmeti
20	MF	ALB	Gjergji Kote (on loan from Partizani)
21	MF	GER	Nikition Delijaj
22	DF	ALB	Omar Musaj

No.	Pos.	Nation	Player
23	DF	KOS	Ermal Veliqi
27	DF	GER	Adrian Durmishaj
28	MF	KOS	Ergyn Ahmeti
29	MF	KOS	Elvis Geci
30	FW	KOS	Amar Demolli (on loan from Prishtina)
33	DF	KOS	Leonard Maloku
34	FW	KOS	Alban Shillova
44	MF	KOS	Dren Aliqku
70	FW	KOS	Altin Vojvoda
74	MF	KOS	Erion Idrizi
77	MF	KOS	Jon Birinxhiku
80	MF	AUT	Denis Suka
89	GK	KOS	Rion Meha
98	GK	KOS	Riad Demiri
—	MF	KOS	Diart Geci

== Personnel ==
Current technical staff
Position	Name
Head coach	(Kosovo) Jeton Mehmeti
Assistant coach	(Kosovo) Bekim Xani (Kosovo) Fillim Guraziu
Chief executive officer	(Kosovo) Basri Jashari
Secretary	(Kosovo) Granit Koci

== List of managers ==
- (Kosovo) Valdet Shoshi (2005–2007)
- (Kosovo) Tahir Lushtaku (–3 Jun 2013)
- (Kosovo) Fadil Rama (30 Jun 2013–18 Sep 2013)
- (Kosovo) Afrim Jashari (19 Sep 2013–16 Mar 2014)
- (Kosovo) Mehmet Mehmeti (18 Mar 2014–Jun 2015)
- (Kosovo) Fadil Rama (29 Jul 2015–Sep 2015)
- (Kosovo) Valdet Shoshi (16 Sep 2015–17 Mar 2016)
- (Kosovo) Fadil Rama (18 Mar 2016–Jun 2016)
- (Kosovo) Afrim Jashari (Jul 2016–25 Nov 2016)
- (Kosovo) Bekim Shotani (17 Jun 2017–Dec 2017)
- (Kosovo) Sadat Pajaziti (4 Jan 2018–Jun 2018)
- (Kosovo) Tahir Lushtaku (Jul 2018–Dec 2019)
- (Kosovo) Gani Sejdiu (2020, 2023)
- (Albania) Bledar Devolli (2020)
- (Kosovo) Gani Sejdiu (2024–2025)
- (Germany) Thomas Brdarić (2025–2026)
- (Kosovo) Jeton Mehmeti (2026-)
