= FC Ferizaj =

Association football club in Kosovo

Ferizaj
- Full name: Football Club Ferizaj
- Nickname: Ujqit (The Wolves)
- Short name: FCF
- Founded: 1923; 103 years ago as FK Borci; 1953; 73 years ago (current form)
- Ground: Ferizaj Synthetic Grass Stadium
- Capacity: 3,000
- Chairman: Lulzim Abazi
- Manager: Arbnor Morina
- League: Kosovo Superleague
- 2025–26: Kosovo Superleague, 9th of 10 (relegated)
- Website: fcferizaj.com
Home colours	Away colours

Football Club Ferizaj (Albanian: Klubi Futbollistik Ferizaj), commonly known as Ferizaj, is a professional football club based in Ferizaj, Kosovo. Founded in 1923, they are the oldest football club in Kosovo, and in 1953 it was re-established with its current name. They currently play in the First League, the second tier of football in the country, after spending two years in the top flight.

== History ==
The club was formed in 1923 as FK Borci (meaning "fighters" in Serbian).

In 1953, a group of local enthusiasts refounded the club as FC Ferizaj with the aim of creating a football club to represent their city. The establishment marked the beginning of its long-term development within regional football. During its early years, the club faced significant challenges, including limited infrastructure and financial resources. Training sessions were often held on school fields, and matches were played in smaller local venues. Despite these constraints, the club continued to develop through the dedication of players, staff, and supporters.

Over time, FC Ferizaj gained recognition within Kosovo football and gradually progressed through the domestic league system. The club later competed in the country’s higher divisions, including appearances in the Kosovo Superleague.

In addition to its competitive activities, the club placed emphasis on youth development through its academy system. Several players developed at the club advanced to professional careers, including participation in national teams and transfers to clubs abroad.

On 7 July 2019, FC Ferizaj held a media conference announcing that a group of English and local investors had assumed leadership of the club. Among the investors was former English international striker Brian Deane, who acquired a 50% share in the club. In December 2019, the English investors withdrew from the club, and the local investors took full ownership of the club.

== Honours ==
FC Ferizaj honours
Type	Competition	Titles	Seasons/Years
Domestic	Kosovo First League	1	2012–13

== Players ==
=== Current squad ===
As of 30 August 2026

Note: Flags indicate national team as defined under FIFA eligibility rules; some limited exceptions apply. Players may hold more than one non-FIFA nationality.

No.	Pos.	Nation	Player
8	MF	KOS	Donart Llabjani
16	FW	KOS	Artin Kurtaj
19	FW	KOS	Erion Sadriu
20	DF	MKD	Filip Gligorov
22	MF	KOS	Betim Haxhimusa (captain)
26	MF	KOS	Gentrit Ramusa (3rd captain)
30	DF	SEN	El Hadji Gueye
32	FW	KOS	Arlind Sejdiu
33	FW	KOS	Leon Miftari
42	DF	CAN	Kosovar Sadiki
45	GK	GUY	Kai McKenzie-Lyle

No.	Pos.	Nation	Player
77	MF	KOS	Planet Veseli
88	MF	ALB	Plarent Fejzaj
99	FW	CMR	Benato Bekima
—	GK	LTU	Ovidijus Šiaulys
—	DF	ALB	Juxhino Zeqiraj
—	DF	POR	Rui Carreira
—	DF	BRA	Westen
—	DF	MKD	Kristijan Toshevski
—	MF	KOS	Ardi Shala
—	MF	KOS	Alban Shabani
—	MF	TTO	Ali Kazim Nakhid
—	FW	MKD	Emir Skenderi
—	FW	KOS	Sinan Kadiri
—	FW	KOS	Arlind Maqedonci
—	FW	CMR	Loiange Ondoa

=== Academy and contracted players ===
Note: Flags indicate national team as defined under FIFA eligibility rules; some limited exceptions apply. Players may hold more than one non-FIFA nationality.

No.	Pos.	Nation	Player
5	DF	KOS	Ensar Murseli (part of under-21 team)
17	FW	KOS	Erti Sherifi (part of under-21 team)
24	FW	KOS	Ledian Krasniqi (part of under-21 team)

No.	Pos.	Nation	Player
—	DF	UZB	Abdugani Kamolov (out due to visa issues)
—	DF	MKD	Antonio Ilievski (out due to injury)
—	GK	KOS	Elvis Shehu
—	FW	KOS	Engjëll Sylejmani
