= 2013–14 Football Superleague of Kosovo =

Raiffeisen Superliga
- Season: 2013–14
- Champions: Llamkos Kosova; 1st title
- Relegated: Fushë Kosova
- Matches: 198
- Goals: 443 (2.24 per match)
- Biggest home win: Ferizaj 5-1 Besa Pejë; Kosova Vushtrri 4-0 Fushë Kosova; Drenica 5-1 Hajvalia
- Biggest away win: Fushë Kosova 0-4 Kosova Vushtrri
- Highest scoring: Drita 5-2 Fushë Kosova

2013–14 Raiffeisen Superliga was the 15th (Note: This season was the 15th season under the name Football Superleague of Kosovo, the 21st season of top-tier football in Kosovo and the 67th season of football in Kosovo overall.) season of top-tier football in Kosovo. The season begun on 23 August 2013. FC Prishtina are the defending champions.

A total of 12 teams competed in the league: 10 sides from the 2012–13 season and two promoted from the Liga e Parë campaign. Fushë Kosova, and Ferizaj were each demoted from the top flight.

== Teams ==
There are 12 competing in the 2013–14 Football Superleague of Kosovo. Last season, Liria and Vëllaznimi were relegated to the Liga e Parë. Ferizaj and Fushë Kosova were promoted.

Location of the 2013–14 Football Superleague of Kosovo teams

Club	Town	Stadium
KF Besa	Peja	Shahin Haxhiislami Stadium
KF Drenica	Skenderaj	Bajram Aliu Stadium
FC Drita	Gjilan	City Stadium (Gnjilane)
KF Ferizaj	Ferizaj	Ismet Shabani Stadium
KF Feronikeli	Drenas	Rexhep Rexhepi Stadium
KF Fushë Kosova	Fushë Kosovë	Ekrem Grajqevci (Kosovo Polje)
KF Hajvalia	Pristina	Hajvalia Stadium
KF Hysi	Podujevo	Merdare Stadium
KF Kosova Vushtrri	Vushtrri	Ferki Aliu Stadium
FC Prishtina	Pristina	Fadil Vokrri Stadium
KF Trepça	Mitrovica	Adem Jashari Olympic Stadium
KF Trepça'89	Mitrovica	Riza Lushta Stadium

== League table ==
Pos	Team	Pld	W	D	L	GF	GA	GD	Pts	Relegation
1	Kosova Vushtrri (C)	33	19	7	7	48	22	+26	64	
2	Trepça'89	33	16	5	12	45	31	+14	53	
3	Prishtina	33	17	6	10	39	26	+13	57 (Note: FC Prishtina deducted 6 points, for not playing against Kosova Vushtrri in the 33rd round according to borozani.com)	
4	Ferizaj	33	15	6	12	43	35	+8	51	
5	Besa	33	15	4	14	37	36	+1	49	
6	Hajvalia	33	13	8	12	40	32	+8	47	
7	Drita	33	12	11	10	43	37	+6	47	
8	Drenica	33	12	9	12	45	42	+3	45	
9	Feronikeli (O)	33	10	11	12	28	33	−5	41	Qualification for the Relegation play-offs
10	Trepça (O)	33	9	9	15	25	32	−7	36	Qualification for the Relegation play-offs
11	Fushë Kosova (R)	33	8	8	17	29	49	−20	32	Relegation to 2014–15 Liga e Parë
12	Hysi (R)	33	8	4	21	21	68	−47	28	Club was expelled from the league

Source: Football Federation of Kosovo (in Albanian), RSSSF
Rules for classification: 1st points; 2nd head-to-head points; 3rd head-to-head goal difference; 4th overall wins; 5th goal difference; 6th goals scored
(C) Champions; (O) Play-off winners; (R) Relegated

== Results ==
=== Matches 1–22 ===
Home \ Away	BES	DRE	DRI	FRZ	FER	FSH	HAJ	HYS	VUS	PRI	TRE	T89
Besa		2–2	2–0	2–0	1–0	1–0	1–0	0–2	1–2	0–1	2–0	1–0
Drenica	0–2		3–0	3–1	0–1	2–1	5–1	3–0 (Note: Match awarded due to the exclusion of Hysi.)	1–1	1–0	1–0	1–1
Drita	0–0	0–0		0–0	2–1	5–2	0–3	2–0	3–0	1–1	0–0	4–2
Ferizaj	5–1	0–0	0–1		0–0	1–0	2–1	3–1	1–1	1–0	2–0	2–0
Feronikeli	3–1	1–2	2–3	2–1		1–1	1–0	0–0	0–1	2–0	2–0	0–4
Fushë Kosova	1–0	1–1	1–1	0–3	1–1		0–0	3–0	0–2	0–0	1–0	1–0
Hajvalia	0–2	4–1	1–0	1–2	0–0	1–1		0–3	2–0	1–3	1–0	1–0
Hysi	0–3	1–1	2–1	2–1	0–0	2–1	0–3		0–3	2–0	0–0	2–0
Kosova Vushtrri	2–1	2–1	3–1	2–1	3–0	4–0	1–0	2–1		0–1	1–0	1–0
Prishtina	3–0	1–2	0–0	1–0	1–0	0–0	1–0	1–2	1–0		2–0	1–0
Trepça	2–0	2–2	1–0	2–2	1–1	3–0	1–0	3–0	0–0	1–0		0–0
Trepça'89	2–0	1–0	1–0	0–1	1–0	2–1	0–4	5–1	0–0	0–2	3–1	

Legend: Blue = home team win; Yellow = draw; Red = away team win.

=== Matches 23–33 ===
Home \ Away	BES	DRE	DRI	FRZ	FER	FSH	HAJ	HYS	VUS	PRI	TRE	T89
Besa		2–0	2–0		1–1			3–0 (Note: Match awarded due to the exclusion of Hysi.)	1–0			2–2
Drenica			3–0	0–4	1–0			3–0	1–3			1–3
Drita				2–0		3–0	1–1	3–0		1–1	3–1	
Ferizaj	2–1					1–0	1–2	3–0		1–4	1–0	
Feronikeli			1–3	1–1			0–0	3–0		1–0	1–0	
Fushë Kosova	2–1	2–1			1–2			3–0	0–4			0–1
Hajvalia	3–0	3–2				1–0			2–2		0–0	
Hysi							0–3					
Kosova Vushtrri			1–1	1–0	0–0			3–0		3–0 (Note: Match awarded.)		0–1
Prishtina	1–0	2–1				3–2	1–1	3–0			3–0	
Trepça	0–1	0–0				2–3		3–0	1–0			1–0
Trepça'89			2–2	4–0	3–0		1–0	3–0		3–1		

Legend: Blue = home team win; Yellow = draw; Red = away team win.

=== Relegation play-offs ===
The relegation play-offs took place on 3–4 June 2015. Both the top tier teams, Feronikeli and Trepça, won their ties against second tier Gjilani and Llapi to keep their place in the Superleague.

3 June 2014

Feronikeli	1–1 (a.e.t.)	Gjilani
Osmani 90'	1 2	? 60'
Penalties
	3–1

4 June 2014

Trepça	2–1 (a.e.t.)	Llapi
	1 2
