= 2012–13 Football Superleague of Kosovo =

Raiffeisen Superliga
- Season: 2012–13
- Champions: Prishtina; 10th title
- Relegated: Liria; Vëllaznimi
- Matches played: 198
- Goals scored: 468 (2.36 per match)
- Biggest home win: Kosova 6–0 Feronikeli
- Biggest away win: Kosova 0–10 Drita
- Highest scoring: Kosova 3–4 Hajvalia

2012–13 Raiffeisen Superliga was the 14th (Note: This season was the 14th season under the name Football Superleague of Kosovo, the 20th season of top-tier football in Kosovo and the 66th season of football in Kosovo overall.) season of top-tier football in Kosovo. The campaign began on 1 August 2012, and ended on 2 June 2013.

== Stadiums and locations ==
Locations of the 2012–13 Football Superleague of Kosovo teams

Team	Club home city	Stadium	Stadium capacity
KF Besa Pejë	Peć	Shahin Haxhiislami Stadium	8,500
KF Drenica	Skenderaj	Bajram Aliu Stadium	3,000
FC Drita	Gjilan	City Stadium	15,000
KF Feronikeli	Glogovac	Rexhep Rexhepi Stadium	2,000
KF Hajvalia	Hajvalia	Hajvalia Studium	1,000
KF Hysi	Podujevo	Merdare Stadium	2,000
KF Vushtrria	Vushtrri	Ferki Aliu Stadium	5.000
KF Liria	Prizren	Përparim Thaçi Stadium	15,000
FC Prishtina	Pristina	Fadil Vokrri Stadium	16,200
KF Trepça	Mitrovica	Adem Jashari Olympic Stadium	29,000
KF Trepça'89	Mitrovica	Riza Lushta	7,000
KF Vëllaznimi	Gjakova	City Stadium	6,000

== League table ==
Pos	Team	Pld	W	D	L	GF	GA	GD	Pts	Relegation
1	Prishtina (C)	33	22	7	4	66	26	+40	73	
2	Trepça'89	33	16	10	7	43	25	+18	58	
3	Besa Pejë	33	14	9	10	38	37	+1	51	
4	Hajvalia	33	12	10	11	43	40	+3	46	
5	Feronikeli	33	12	10	11	33	45	−12	46	
6	Trepça	33	12	9	12	35	34	+1	45	
7	Drita	33	11	12	10	44	45	−1	45	
8	Drenica	33	10	13	10	37	38	−1	43	
9	Hysi	33	11	9	13	34	31	+3	42	
10	Kosova Vushtrri (O)	33	10	12	11	41	34	+7	42	Qualification for the Relegation play-offs
11	Vëllaznimi (R)	33	6	9	18	23	43	−20	27	Relegation to 2013–14 Liga e Parë
12	Liria (R)	33	2	10	21	22	61	−39	16	Relegation to 2013–14 Liga e Parë

Source: 2012–13 Football Superleague of Kosovo
Rules for classification: 1st points; 2nd head-to-head points; 3rd head-to-head goal difference; 4th overall wins; 5th goal difference; 6th goals scored
(C) Champions; (O) Play-off winners; (R) Relegated

== Results ==
=== Matches 1–22 ===
Home \ Away	BES	DRE	DRI	FER	HAJ	HYS	VUS	LIR	PRI	TRE	T89	VLZ
Besa Pejë		1–0	1–1	2–1	1–0	0–0	5–0	0–3	2–4	2–0	1–0	3–0
Drenica	2–2		1–1	2–2	3–1	2–1	1–1	2–0	0–0	1–2	0–0	1–1
Drita	2–0	1–1		4–1	4–1	2–1	0–4	1–1	1–1	4–2	2–1	3–1
Feronikeli	1–0	2–1	2–0		0–0	4–2	2–1	1–1	2–0	1–1	1–4	1–0
Hajvalia	2–0	1–0	3–0	0–0		2–0	1–1	3–0	2–4	0–1	1–0	2–1
Hysi	1–1	0–0	2–1	1–0	3–0		4–0	1–0	0–1	0–0	0–0	1–0
Kosova Vushtrri	0–0	0–0	0–1	0–0	3–4	2–0		2–1	0–0	1–1	0–0	1–0
Liria	0–0	1–1	1–3	2–0	0–0	1–1	1–1		0–1	0–0	0–2	1–1
Prishtina	0–0	3–1	2–1	1–0	1–0	1–2	2–1	3–0		2–1	1–2	2–0
Trepça	5–1	0–0	1–1	2–0	0–0	1–0	1–0	3–1	2–1		0–1	1–0
Trepça'89	2–0	2–2	2–0	0–0	1–1	3–0	2–0	1–0	1–1	1–0		1–0
Vëllaznimi	0–0	1–0	0–0	0–1	1–0	3–1	0–0	3–1	0–1	1–0	1–1	

Legend: Blue = home team win; Yellow = draw; Red = away team win.

=== Matches 23–33 ===
Home \ Away	BES	DRE	DRI	FER	HAJ	HYS	VUS	LIR	PRI	TRE	T89	VLZ
Besa Pejë		4–0	2–0			1–0	0–0	3–0				2–0
Drenica			2–0		2–1	1–0					1–3	3–0
Drita				1–1		0–1	1–0	2–2			2–1	
Feronikeli	3–0	0–1			1–1				1–8	1–0		2–1
Hajvalia	3–0		1–1			2–2	1–3	2–0			2–1	
Hysi				2–0			1–1	5–0	0–1	2–0		
Kosova Vushtrri		2–1		6–0				4–0	0–1	5–0		
Liria		0–1		1–2					0–2	1–3		2–5
Prishtina	5–0	5–3	2–2		3–2						2–0	5–0
Trepça	0–1	0–1	3–1		2–2				0–0			2–0
Trepça'89	2–3			0–0		1–0	3–1	2–1		2–1		
Vëllaznimi			1–1		1–2	0–0	0–1				1–1	

Legend: Blue = home team win; Yellow = draw; Red = away team win.

=== Relegation play-offs ===
5 June 2013

Kosova Vushtrri	2–1	Deçani
