= 2010–11 Football Superleague of Kosovo =

Raiffeisen Superliga
- Season: 2010–11
- Champions: Hysi; 1st title
- Relegated: Flamurtari, Ferizaj

2010–11 Raiffeisen Superliga was the 12th (Note: This season was the 12th season under the name Football Superleague of Kosovo, the 18th season of top-tier football in Kosovo and the 64th season of football in Kosovo overall.) season of top-tier football in Kosovo.

== Stadiums and locations ==
Locations of the 2010–11 Football Superleague of Kosovo teams

Team	Club home city	Stadium	Stadium capacity
KF Ballkani	Suva Reka	Suva Reka City Stadium	unknown
KF Besa Pejë	Peć	Stadiumi Shahin Haxhiislami	8.500
KF Drenica	Skenderaj	Stadiumi Bajram Aliu	3.000
KF Ferizaj	Ferizaj	Stadiumi Ismet Shabani	7.000
KF Flamurtari	Pristina	Stadiumi Xhemajl Ibishi	3.000
KF Hysi	Podujevo	Stadiumi Merdare	2.000
KF KEK	Obilić	Stadiumi Agron Rama	15.000
KF Liria	Prizren	Stadiumi Përparim Thaçi	15.000
FC Prishtina	Pristina	Fadil Vokrri Stadium	16.200
KF Trepça	Mitrovica	Stadiumi Olimpik Adem Jashari	29.000
KF Trepça'89	Mitrovica	Stadiumi Riza Lushta	7.000
KF Vëllaznimi	Gjakova	City Stadium	6.000

== League table ==
Pos	Team	Pld	W	D	L	GF	GA	GD	Pts	Relegation
1	Hysi (C)	33	23	4	6	73	35	+38	73	
2	Prishtina	33	21	6	6	56	23	+33	69	
3	Liria	33	13	8	12	56	49	+7	47	
4	Drenica	33	13	5	15	44	42	+2	44	
5	Besa	33	12	7	14	47	44	+3	43	
6	KEK	33	12	7	14	45	50	−5	43	
7	Trepça'89	33	12	7	14	40	45	−5	43	
8	Trepça	33	11	9	13	37	48	−11	42	
9	Vëllaznimi	33	12	5	16	40	52	−12	41	
10	Ballkani (R)	33	11	8	14	40	47	−7	41	Relegation to 2011–12 Liga e Parë
11	Flamurtari (R)	33	11	6	16	39	46	−7	39	Relegation to 2011–12 Liga e Parë
12	Ferizaj (R)	33	7	8	18	28	64	−36	29	Relegation to 2011–12 Liga e Parë

Source: RSSSF.org
Rules for classification: 1st points; 2nd head-to-head points; 3rd head-to-head goal difference; 4th overall wins; 5th goal difference; 6th goals scored
(C) Champions; (R) Relegated

== Results ==
=== Matches 1–22 ===
Home \ Away	BAL	BES	DRE	FRZ	FLA	HYS	KEK	LIR	PRI	TRE	T89	VLZ
Ballkani		1–1	1–0	1–0	2–1	1–2	0–0	1–1	1–0	0–0	1–1	2–1
Besa	0–0		2–1	7–0	4–1	3–2	2–0	2–2	3–1	2–2	3–0	2–1
Drenica	2–0	1–0		1–0	2–1	2–2	0–1	2–1	0–2	1–2	2–1	6–1
Ferizaj	2–1	0–1	2–0		2–2	2–4	2–1	1–1	1–1	2–1	0–0	1–1
Flamurtari	4–3	1–0	2–0	3–0		0–3	1–2	1–1	1–1	3–1	1–0	0–0
Hysi	1–1	3–1	3–1	1–0	4–2		3–2	5–0	0–1	2–2	4–1	2–1
KEK	2–1	4–2	3–1	3–1	3–0	1–2		4–2	0–1	2–2	1–0	1–1
Liria	3–0	3–0	0–0	3–0	1–0	3–2	3–0		2–3	3–1	0–0	3–2
Prishtina	3–0	2–0	0–0	3–1	3–2	1–0	4–0	1–0		3–1	1–0	3–2
Trepça	2–1	2–0	1–1	3–0	0–0	2–1	2–2	1–0	1–1		3–1	2–0
Trepça'89	3–3	1–1	2–1	5–2	3–1	1–0	3–2	1–0	1–0	1–0		3–0
Vëllaznimi	2–1	0–0	2–0	3–0	2–1	1–2	1–1	2–4	0–3	2–0	3–2	

Legend: Blue = home team win; Yellow = draw; Red = away team win.

=== Matches 23–33 ===
Home \ Away	BAL	BES	DRE	FRZ	FLA	HYS	KEK	LIR	PRI	TRE	T89	VLZ
Ballkani		1–0		5–1	1–0				1–0	6–0		
Besa					2–0		1–2	2–3	0–1		1–0	2–1
Drenica	5–1	3–2		0–0					2–1	3–1		
Ferizaj		4–1			1–0				1–1	1–0		0–2
Flamurtari			2–1			0–1	1–0	4–2				1–0
Hysi	4–1	1–0	3–0	3–0						2–1	5–1	
KEK	2–0		0–4	1–1		0–1		2–2			2–0	
Liria	1–2		2–1	3–0		2–3				3–0	1–1	
Prishtina					1–0	0–0	3–0	3–1			3–1	5–0
Trepça		0–0			0–3		1–0		1–0		1–2	1–0
Trepça'89	2–0		0–1	2–0	0–0							1–2
Vëllaznimi	1–0		1–0			1–2	2–1	2–0				

Legend: Blue = home team win; Yellow = draw; Red = away team win.
