= Fahredin Duraku =

Yugoslav footballer (born 1966)

Personal information
- Date of birth: 18 July 1966 (age 60)
- Place of birth: Mitrovica, SFR Yugoslavia
- Position: Midfielder

Senior career*
| Years | Team | Apps | (Gls) |
| 1984–1986 | Trepça | 38 | (0) |
| 1987–1989 | Prishtina | 21 | (0) |
| 1989–1992 | Rad | 73 | (10) |
| 1992–1993 | Galatasaray | 0 | (0) |
| 1993–1995 | SpVgg Unterhaching | 26 | (2) |
| 1995–1997 | Bursaspor | 0 | (0) |
| 1996 | Tennis Borussia Berlin | 9 | (0) |
| 1997–1999 | Prishtina | | |
| 2000 | VfR Mannheim | | |

International career
| | Yugoslavia U21 | 1 | (0) |

Managerial career
- 2014–2015: Trepça'89
- 2021–2022: Vushtrria
- 2023: Mitrovica (women)
- 2025–: Büyükçekmece Tepecikspor
- * Club domestic league appearances and goals

Fahredin Duraku (born 18 July 1966) is a Kosovan former professional footballer and coach.

== Club career ==
Born in Mitrovica, he started playing in Trepça (1984–86) before moving to Yugoslav First League club Prishtina (1987–89) and Belgrade's FK Rad (1989–92). In 1992, he moved to Turkey where he played in Galatasaray S.K. (1992–93) and Bursaspor (1995–97), while the rest of his career he spend playing in German clubs SpVgg Unterhaching (1994–95), Tennis Borussia Berlin (1996) and VfR Mannheim (2000). He also played for Prishtina again in the late 1990s.

== International career ==
Durak made one appearance for the Yugoslav U21 national team.

== Coaching career ==
=== Trepça'89 ===
On the 29th September 2014, Duraku became the head coach of the Kosovo Superleague team Trepça'89 after Rafet Prekazi was relieved of duty.

== Personal life ==
Born in Mitrovica, Durak is of Albanian descent.
