= 1977–78 Yugoslav Cup =

Marshal Tito Cup

Tournament details
- Country: Yugoslavia

Final positions
- Champions: Rijeka (1st title)
- Runners-up: Trepça

Tournament statistics
- Matches played: 31
- Top goal scorer: Petar Nikezić (4)

The 1977–78 Yugoslav Cup was the 30th season of the top football knockout competition in SFR Yugoslavia, the Yugoslav Cup (Serbo-Croatian: Kup Jugoslavije), also known as the "Marshal Tito Cup" (Kup Maršala Tita), since its establishment in 1946. It was won by Rijeka, for whom it was their first major silverware in history.

This season marked the end of the domination of Hajduk Split in this competition, as their run of five consecutive cup wins came to an end when they were knocked out by eventual winners Rijeka in the semi-final. The other finalists from the previous season, Dinamo Zagreb, also exited in the semi-final following their defeat to minnows Trepča.

Along with Trepča and Rijeka, surprise of the tournament were also Borac Čačak, who were the last team from outside top level in the tournament when they were knocked out in the quarter-finals.

== Calendar ==
Round	Date	Fixtures	Clubs
First round	7 September 1977	16	32 → 16
Second round	26 October 1977	8	16 → 8
Quarter-finals	25 and 26 February 1978	8	8 → 4
Semi-finals	29 March 1978	4	4 → 2
Final	24 May 1978	2	2 → 1

== First round ==
First round proper was played on 7 September 1977. Ties were decided over a single leg, with penalty shootouts used to determine winners when matches ended in a draw after regular time and extra time. Seventeen out of eighteen 1977–78 Yugoslav First League clubs entered the competition at this stage (everyone except Osijek, who had been promoted to top level at the end of the 1976–77 season along with Kosovo-based minnows Trepça).

The seventeen top-level clubs were joined by fifteen lower-level clubs who had reached this stage by qualifying through various regional cups and an unseeded draw was held to determine fixtures. Five top-level clubs were knocked out at this stage: Budućnost, Čelik, OFK Belgrade, Partizan and Radnički Niš.

This round also featured the Slovenian derby in which Ljubljana-based Olimpija beat second-level side Maribor 4–0.

In the following tables winning teams are marked in bold; teams from outside top level are marked in italic script.

Tie no	Home team	Score	Away team
1	Bačka	0–1	**NK Zagreb**
2	**Borac Banja Luka**	6–2	Željezničar
3	**Borac Čačak**	2–1	Vardar
4	**Red Star**	6–3	Solin
5	**Dinamo Vinkovci**	2–1	Tekstilac Odžaci
6	**Dinamo Zagreb**	3–1	Radnički Niš
7	**Bor**	3–1	Slaven Koprivnica
8	**Sarajevo**	3–1	Budućnost
9	**Jedinstvo Bihać**	2–1	OFK Belgrade
10	Leotar	0–2	**Hajduk Split**
11	**Rijeka**	1–0	Partizan
12	**Olimpija**	4–0	Maribor
13	Sutjeska	0–0 (4–5 p)	**Sloboda**
14	**Trepça**	1–0	Napredak Kruševac
15	**Velež**	3–1	Čelik
16	**Vojvodina**	1–0	Radnički Kragujevac

== Second round ==
Second round, or round of 16, was played on 26 October 1977. It featured twelve top flight and four lower-level clubs. Borac Čačak were the only team from outside top level who managed to progress further after winning their away tie against Bosnian side Sloboda on penalties.

Tie no	Home team	Score	Away team
1	Dinamo Vinkovci	0–1	Rijeka
2	Dinamo Zagreb	2–0	Jedinstvo Bihać
3	Hajduk Split	3–0	Red Star
4	NK Zagreb	3–0	Sarajevo
5	Olimpija	0–0 (3–5 p)	Trepça
6	Sloboda	1–1 (4–6 p)	Borac Čačak
7	Velež	2–0	Bor
8	Vojvodina	2–0	Borac Banja Luka

== Quarter-finals ==
Following the winter break, quarter-final ties were played on 25 and 26 February 1978. The only remaining team from outside top level Borac Čačak were knocked out by Trepča. Defending cup winners Hajduk Split were also knocked out in an Adriatic derby against the fellow Croatian side Rijeka.

Tie no	Home team	Score	Away team
1	Borac Čačak	0–1	Trepča
2	Dinamo Zagreb	3–2	Vojvodina
3	Hajduk Split	0–1	Rijeka
4	NK Zagreb	0–1	Velež

== Semi-finals ==
Semi-finals were played on 29 March 1978. The last remaining member of the "Big Four" clubs, Dinamo Zagreb, were sensationally knocked out on penalties after they were held to a goalless draw by Trepča in Mitrovica.

Tie no	Home team	Score	Away team
1	Rijeka	3–1	Velež
2	Trepça	0–0 (5–4 p)	Dinamo Zagreb

== Final ==
Rijeka and Trepça both reached the 1978 cup final for the first time in their respective club histories, marking their greatest success to date and it was one of the few Yugoslav Cup finals which did not feature any of the so-called "Big Four" clubs. During the 1977–78 Yugoslav First League season the clubs experienced wildly differing fortunes - while Rijeka, traditionally a decent competitive side, enjoyed one of their most successful seasons ever finishing fifth in the league, newcomers Trepça struggled in top flight and ended the season in bottom picking up just 24 points in 36 league matches (with 2 points for a win).

In line with the rules adopted by the Football Association of Yugoslavia in the late 1960s the final was to be played as a one-legged tie in Belgrade in cases when both finalists hailed from outside the capital city. The match was thus played at the Red Star Stadium on 24 May 1978, intentionally set so that it would coincide with Youth Day, a national holiday celebrated on 25 May and which doubled as the official commemoration of Josip Broz Tito's birthday, the cup's sponsor.

Played in front of 45,000 spectators, the game ended in a goalless draw after the regular 90 minutes. Rijeka's Milan Radović then scored a winner in the first minute of extra time and as the result remained unchanged until the final whistle, Rijeka won their first major silverware in history. This success also allowed Rijeka to qualify for European competitions for the first time and they went on to appear in the 1978–79 European Cup Winners' Cup.

Keeping most of its key players, Rijeka later managed to defend their title in the following 1978–79 Yugoslav Cup season and also reached the Yugoslav Cup final one more time in the 1986–87 Yugoslav Cup before the competition ceased to exist in 1991. After winning the 1978 and 1979 Yugoslav cups their next domestic silverware came only 26 years later when they won the 2004–05 Croatian Cup.

Trepça on the other hand slipped back down to the Yugoslav Second League at the end of the 1978–79 season and slowly fell into obscurity. Reaching the 1978 cup final is still considered their biggest success in history and their only domestic silverware to date came when they won the Superleague of Kosovo in 2009–10.

=== Match details ===
24 May 1978

Rijeka	1–0 (a.e.t.)	Trepça
Radović 91'

Red Star Stadium, Belgrade
Attendance: 45,000
Referee: Radmilo Ristić (Belgrade)

Rijeka	Trepča

RIJEKA:
GK	1	(Socialist Federal Republic of Yugoslavia) Radojko Avramović
DF	2	(Socialist Federal Republic of Yugoslavia) Sergio Machin
DF	3	(Socialist Federal Republic of Yugoslavia) Miloš Hrstić
DF	4	(Socialist Federal Republic of Yugoslavia) Nikica Cukrov
DF	5	(Socialist Federal Republic of Yugoslavia) Zvjezdan Radin
DF	6	(Socialist Federal Republic of Yugoslavia) Srećko Juričić
MF	7	(Socialist Federal Republic of Yugoslavia) Salih Durkalić
FW	8	(Socialist Federal Republic of Yugoslavia) Milan Radović	Substituted off
FW	9	(Socialist Federal Republic of Yugoslavia) Miodrag Kustudić
MF	10	(Socialist Federal Republic of Yugoslavia) Milan Ružić
FW	11	(Socialist Federal Republic of Yugoslavia) Damir Desnica
Substitutes:
FW	?	(Socialist Federal Republic of Yugoslavia) Zoran Šestan	Substituted on
Manager:
(Socialist Federal Republic of Yugoslavia) Dragutin Spasojević

TREPČA:
GK	1	(Socialist Federal Republic of Yugoslavia) Dragan Mutibarić
DF	2	(Socialist Federal Republic of Yugoslavia) Dragoljub Ljiljak
DF	3	(Socialist Federal Republic of Yugoslavia) Fikret Grbović
DF	4	(Socialist Federal Republic of Yugoslavia) Rafet Prekazi
DF	5	(Socialist Federal Republic of Yugoslavia) Erdogan Celina
DF	6	(Socialist Federal Republic of Yugoslavia) Fisnik Ademi
MF	7	(Socialist Federal Republic of Yugoslavia) Miodrag Radojević	Substituted off
MF	8	(Socialist Federal Republic of Yugoslavia) Ramadan Cimili	Substituted off
FW	9	(Socialist Federal Republic of Yugoslavia) Miško Stolić
MF	10	(Socialist Federal Republic of Yugoslavia) Raif Haxha
MF	11	(Socialist Federal Republic of Yugoslavia) Ilija Savović
Substitutes:
MF	?	(Socialist Federal Republic of Yugoslavia) Ljubomir Radević	Substituted on
MF	?	(Socialist Federal Republic of Yugoslavia) Vahedin Ajeti	Substituted on
Manager:
(Socialist Federal Republic of Yugoslavia) Hysni Maxhuni
(Socialist Federal Republic of Yugoslavia) Ajet Shosholli

== See also ==
- 1977–78 Yugoslav First League
