= 2009–10 Football Superleague of Kosovo =

Raiffeisen Superliga
- Season: 2009–10
- Champions: Trepça; 2nd Kosovan title
- Relegated: Kosova Vushtrri; Gjilani
- Goals scored: 468
- Average goals/game: 2.84
- Top goalscorer: TBA
- Biggest home win: TBA
- Biggest away win: TBA
- Highest scoring: KEK 5–3 Vëllaznimi; Hysi 6–2 Kosova Vushtrri (8 goals)

2009–10 Raiffeisen Superliga was the 11th (Note: This season was the 11th season under the name Football Superleague of Kosovo, the 17th season of top-tier football in Kosovo and the 63rd season of football in Kosovo overall.) season of top-tier football in Kosovo. The campaign began on 15 August 2009, and ended on 30 May 2010.

== Stadiums and locations ==
Locations of the 2009–10 Football Superleague of Kosovo teams

Team	Club home city	Stadium	Stadium capacity
KF Besa Pejë	Peć	Shahin Haxhiislami Stadium	8,500
KF Drenica	Skenderaj	Bajram Aliu Stadium	3,000
KF Ferizaj	Ferizaj	Ismet Shabani Studium	5,000
KF Flamurtari	Pristina	Flamurtari Studium	2,500
SC Gjilani	Gjilan	City Stadium	10,000
KF Hysi	Podujevo	Merdare Stadium	2,000
KF KEK	Obiliq	Agron Rama Studium	15,000
KF Vushtrria	Vushtrri	Ferki Aliu Stadium	5,000
KF Liria	Prizren	Përparim Thaçi Stadium	15,000
FC Prishtina	Pristina	Fadil Vokrri Stadium	25,000
KF Trepça	Mitrovica	Adem Jashari Olympic Stadium	29,000
KF Vëllaznimi	Gjakova	City Stadium	6,000

== League table ==
Pos	Team	Pld	W	D	L	GF	GA	GD	Pts	Relegation
1	Trepça (C)	33	16	11	6	46	27	+19	59	
2	Prishtina	33	16	7	10	38	32	+6	55	
3	KEK	33	15	8	10	50	33	+17	53	
4	Besa	33	15	6	12	43	38	+5	51	
5	Drenica	33	14	7	12	43	28	+15	49	
6	Hysi	33	14	5	14	51	41	+10	47	
7	Flamurtari	33	12	11	10	42	44	−2	47	
8	Liria	33	12	8	13	38	35	+3	44	
9	Ferizaj	33	12	6	15	28	42	−14	42	
10	Vëllaznimi	33	12	6	15	33	42	−9	42	
11	Kosova Vushtrri (R)	33	9	7	17	28	43	−15	34	Relegation to 2010–11 Liga e Parë
12	Gjilani (R)	33	5	10	18	28	52	−24	25	Relegation to 2010–11 Liga e Parë

(C) Champions; (R) Relegated

== Results ==
=== Matches 1–22 ===
Home \ Away	BES	DRE	FER	FLA	GJI	HYS	KEK	VUS	LIR	PRI	TRE	VLZ
Besa Pejë		2–1	1–0	0–0	2–0	3–0	1–0	0–0	5–2	3–1	0–0	2–1
Drenica	3–2		1–0	0–2	2–1	4–2	1–1	3–0	2–2	2–1	2–0	2–0
Ferizaj	2–1	2–0		1–1	1–1	1–1	1–0	1–0	1–1	1–0	1–3	1–0
Flamurtari	2–1	2–0	4–1		3–2	0–0	0–3	1–1	1–0	3–2	1–1	2–1
Gjilani	2–1	0–0	2–2	1–3		0–1	1–0	2–2	0–0	0–2	0–3	3–1
Hysi	1–1	2–0	1–0	2–0	2–0		3–4	6–2	2–1	0–0	4–0	2–0
KEK	0–1	6–0	2–0	1–1	2–1	1–0		1–0	1–2	2–2	1–0	5–3
Kosova Vushtrri	0–2	4–0	2–0	0–0	0–0	1–0	0–0		1–0	0–0	0–3	1–0
Liria	1–0	1–1	1–0	1–0	1–1	3–2	2–2	2–0		3–0	0–0	3–0
Prishtina	1–0	3–0	2–1	2–2	2–1	1–4	1–0	1–0	1–0		1–2	0–0
Trepça	0–0	3–0	0–1	3–2	1–1	3–2	1–1	3–0	1–0	0–0		3–1
Vëllaznimi	0–0	0–0	0–1	3–1	6–1	2–2	0–2	1–0	0–1	2–1	1–0	

Legend: Blue = home team win; Yellow = draw; Red = away team win.

=== Matches 23–33 ===
Home \ Away	BES	DRE	FER	FLA	GJI	HYS	KEK	VUS	LIR	PRI	TRE	VLZ
Besa Pejë			3–0		3–1		4–1	2–1	1–0	0–1		
Drenica	1–0			3–0		2–1				1–0		0–0
Ferizaj		2–1			2–1			2–1		0–3		1–1
Flamurtari	1–0		1–0		1–1	1–2		4–2		1–1		
Gjilani		1–2					2–1		2–0		0–0	0–1
Hysi	2–1		3–1		2–0			1–2	3–1	1–2		
KEK		0–0	3–0	3–0		1–0					1–1	3–0
Kosova Vushtrri		2–1			3–0		1–2		1–0		1–2	
Liria		0–1	2–0	2–1			3–0				2–2	0–1
Prishtina					1–0		1–0	1–0	2–1		1–0	
Trepça	2–1	2–1	2–0	1–1		1–0						3–0
Vëllaznimi	1–0			3–1		1–0		2–0		2–1		

Legend: Blue = home team win; Yellow = draw; Red = away team win.

=== Relegation play-offs ===
Date	10th place Raiffeisen Superliga	Score	3rd place Liga e Parë	Goals
2 June 2010	KF Vëllaznimi	2–0 (0–0)	KF Besiana	1-0 Atdhe Gashi (58.) 2-0 Atdhe Gashi (72.)
