= Liridon Ahmeti =

Kosovar-Albanian footballer

Personal information
- Full name: Liridon Ahmeti
- Date of birth: 16 July 1985 (age 41)
- Place of birth: Vushtrri, SFR Yugoslavia
- Height: 1.85 m (6 ft 1 in)
- Position: Left back

Senior career*
Years	Team	Apps	(Gls)
2005–2006	Flamurtari		
2006–2007	Tistedal TIF		
2007	Oulu		
2007	Besa Kavajë	2	(0)
2007–2009	Teuta	48	(1)
2009–2011	Trepça		
2011	Shkumbini	5	(0)
2012–2013	KF Trepça'89		
2013	Llamkos Kosova		
2014	Partizani	1	(0)
2014–2015	Vushtrria		
2016	Prishtina		
2016	Vushtrria		
- * Club domestic league appearances and goals as of 13 January 2015

Liridon Ahmeti (born 16 July 1985, in Vushtrri) is a Kosovar-Albanian footballer who plays as a defender. He played last for Vushtrria in the Football Superleague of Kosovo and he had a short spell with Partizani in the Albanian Superliga.

== Club career ==
Ahmeti returned to Albania to sign a two-year contract with Partizani Tirana.

He left the club in July 2014.

== Honours ==
Trepça

- Kosovo Superleague: 2009–10
