= Emin Baliqi =

Kosovan footballer and manager

Personal information
- Date of birth: 2 June 1983
- Place of birth: Titova Mitrovica, SFR Yugoslavia
- Height: 1.83 m (6 ft 0 in)
- Position: Midfielder

Youth career
- Minatori'89

Senior career*
Years	Team	Apps	(Gls)
2000–2002	Minatori'89		
2002–2007	Prishtina		
2007–2008	Besëlidhja	7	(1)
2008–2009	Elbasani	6	(0)
2009–2010	Trepça		
2010–2012	Trepça '89		
2013–2014	Drenica		
2014–2015	Trepça '89		
2015–2017	Trepça		

International career
- Kosovo

Managerial career
- 2018–2020: Trepça (youth)
- 2020–2025: Trepça
- 2025: Trepça
- * Club domestic league appearances and goals

Emin Baliqi (born 2 June 1983) is a Kosovan former footballer and head coach of Trepça.

== Playing career ==
Baliqi started his youth career with Minatori'89. He started his professional career with the same club. In 2002, he became part of Prishtina where he stayed until 2007. In 2007, he signed for Besëlidhja and in 2008 for Elbasani.

== Coaching career ==
Baliqi was the manager of Trepça from 2020 until 2025 in the First Football League of Kosovo. In July 2025, he returned to Trepça in the First Football League of Kosovo.

== Personal life ==
His father, Ahmet Baliqi, is a former professional handball player and coach for Trepça.

== Honours ==
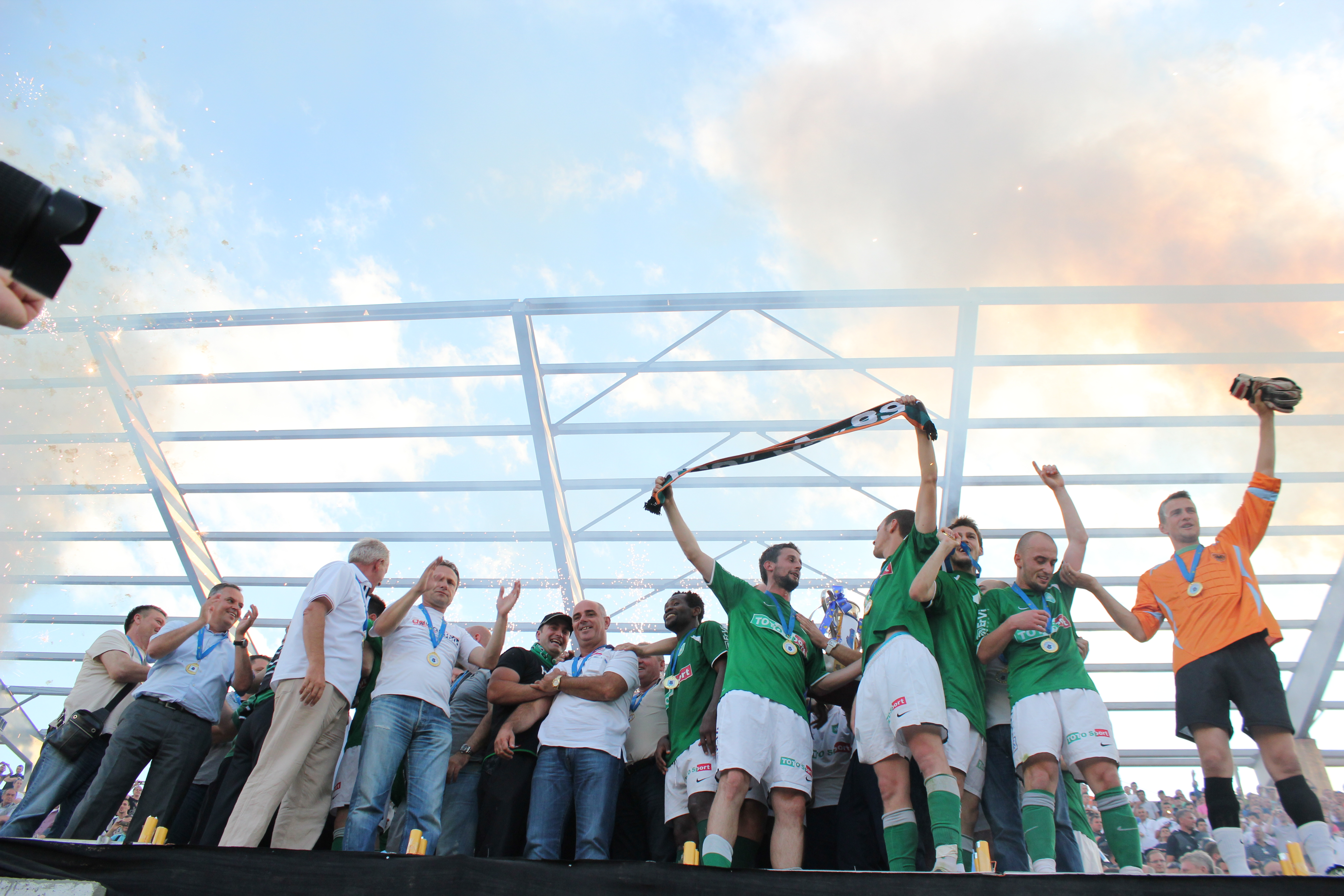
Emin Baliqi with Trepça '89 after winning the Kosovar Cup (2012)

Prishtina

- Kosovo Superleague: 2003–04
- Kosovar Cup: 2005–06

Trepça '89

- Kosovar Cup: 2011–12

Trepça

- Kosovo Superleague: 2009–10
- Kosovo First League: 2015–16
