= Ajeti =

Ajeti is an Albanian surname. Notable people with the surname include:

- Adonis Ajeti (born 1997), Swiss footballer
- Albian Ajeti (born 1997), Swiss footballer
- Arlind Ajeti (born 1993), Albanian footballer
- Bajram Ajeti (born 1989), Kosovan footballer
- Bardhyl Ajeti (1977–2005), reporter for the Albanian-language daily newspaper Bota Sot
- Idriz Ajeti (1917–2019), Albanian linguist
- Melihate Ajeti (1935–2005), Kosovar Albanian actress
- Vahedin Ajeti (born 1960), Kosovar Albanian footballer
