= Liridon =

Liridon is an Albanian male given name shared by the following people:

- Liridon Ahmeti (born 16 July 1985 in Vushtrri), a Kosovar-Albanian footballer who plays as a defender
- Liridon Balaj (born 15 August 1999), Kosovan footballer
- Liridon Kalludra (born 5 November 1991), a Swedish footballer who plays as a midfielder
- Liridon Krasniqi (born 1 January 1992), a Kosovo Albanian footballer
- Liridon Latifi (born 6 February 1994), an Albanian professional footballer who plays as a midfielder
- Liridon Leci (born 1985), a Kosovo Albanian footballer
- Liridon Mulaj (born 4 January 1999), Swiss footballer
- Liridon Osmanaj (born 4 January 1992 in Maribor), a Slovenian footballer
- Liridon Selmani (born 12 June 1992), an Albanian footballer who plays as a forward
- Liridon Vocaj (born 1 October 1993), an Albanian football midfielder
