= Nazmi Rama =

Kosovar Albanian footballer

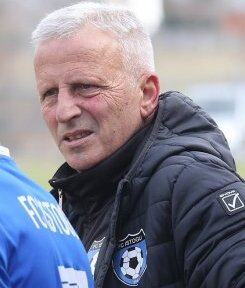
- Nazmi Rama as the coach of Istogu in 2021

Personal information
- Date of birth: 1 October 1960 (age 66)
- Place of birth: Kosovska Mitrovica, FPR Yugoslavia
- Position: Defender

Senior career*
Years	Team	Apps	(Gls)
1981–1984	Trepça	26	(0)
1984–1985	Borac Banja Luka	3	(0)
1985–1986	Novi Pazar	29	(3)
1987–1990	Prishtina	43	(5)
1990	Čelik Zenica	8	(0)
1991	Sloga Jugomagnat		
1991–1994	Bashkimi		
- Trepça
- Prishtina
- Minatori '89
Total		+119	(+8)

Managerial career
- Drenica
- Trepça
- 2010–2020: Kosovo U-19 (assistant)
- 2014–2015: Istogu
- 2016: Trepça
- 2019: Dukagjini
- 2020–2021: Istogu
- 2021–2022: A&N
- 2022–2023: Vllaznia Pozheran
- 2024–2025: Mitrovica
- * Club domestic league appearances and goals

Nazmi Rama (born October 1, 1960) is a Kosovan coach and former footballer. He was for many years assistant coach of the Kosovo national under-19 football team.

== Playing career ==
Born in Mitrovica, Rama started his professional career for Trepça where he made 26 appearances in the Yugoslav Second League. Then, he continued to play for other teams of the Yugoslav Second League like Borac Čačak, Novi Pazar, Prishtina and Čelik Zenica. After the dissolution of Yugoslavia, Rama played for two Macedonian clubs. Before ending his career as a player he played for Trepça, Prishtina and Minatori'89 in the Independent League of Kosovo.

== Coaching career ==
=== Dukagjini ===
On the 15 January 2019, Rama signed for Dukagjini but was sacked later on the 1 April 2019.

=== Istogu ===
On the 4 July 2020, Rama was appointed as the head coach of Istogu.
