= Skënder Shengyli =

Kosovar Albanian footballer (born 1960)

Personal information
- Full name: Skënder Shengyli
- Date of birth: 15 February 1960 (age 66)
- Place of birth: Prizren, FPR Yugoslavia
- Position: Defender

Senior career*
Years	Team	Apps	(Gls)
1981–1983	Liria Prizren	57	(0)
1983–1989	Prishtina (not included 1986–88)	127	(0)
1989–1991	Karşıyaka	36	(0)

Managerial career
- 2009: Prishtina
- Ferizaj
- 2015: Liria
- 2016: Vëllaznimi
- * Club domestic league appearances and goals

Skënder Shengyli (Serbian: Скендер Шенгуљ/Skender Šengulj, born 15 February 1960 in Prizren) is a Kosovar Albanian football former player.

== Managerial career ==
A former manager of Prishtina and Ferizaj, he was appointed manager of Vëllaznimi in March 2016, only to be sacked in July that year.

Shengyli was favorite to retake the helm at Liria Prizren in March 2019.
