= Rexhep Xhaka =

Kosovan coach & footballer (born 1945)

Personal information
- Date of birth: 4 March 1945 (age 81)
- Place of birth: Kosovska Mitrovica, DF Yugoslavia
- Position: Midfielder

Youth career
- 1958–1961: Trepça
- 1961–1966: Remont Mitrovica

Senior career*
Years	Team	Apps	(Gls)
1966–1978	Trepça		

Managerial career
- 1978: Trepça (assistant)
- 1979–1990: Trepça (youth)
- 2000–2003: Trepça
- 2004–2013: Trepça '89 (youth)
- * Club domestic league appearances and goals

Rexhep Xhaka (born 4 March 1945) is a former Kosovan coach and former footballer. With over 600 appearances for Trepça, he holds the record for the most-capped player.

== Honours ==
=== Player ===
Trepça

- Yugoslav Second League: 1976–77
