= Trofeo Ciudad de Zaragoza =

- Organiser(s): Real Zaragoza
- Founded: 1971; 55 years ago
- Region: Spain
- Teams: 2 (Host + Guest)
- Current champions: (Colombia) Millonarios F.C.
- Most championships: Real Zaragoza (29)
- Broadcaster: Aragón TV
- Trofeo Ciudad de Zaragoza 2023

The Trofeo Ciudad de Zaragoza is a soccer tournament organized by Real Zaragoza based in the city of Zaragoza, Spain.

It has been played, since its creation in 1971, at the La Romareda Stadium.

After the death of the former soccer player Carlos Lapetra in 1995, the trophy changed its name in his honor, so since the 1998 edition, it has been held under the name Memorial Carlos Lapetra .

== History ==
The first edition of the Trofeo Ciudad de Zaragoza was held in May 1971, approved with a budget of 3 million pesetas that was expected to be obtained from ticket sales. The first participants were Real Zaragoza, Anderlecht and Colonia, which opened the list of winners. The initiative arose from the director and councilor for festivities, Antonio Mur, encouraged by various sectors of the city.

Initially it was played at the end of the season (in May), later becoming the presentation match for the Zaragoza fans (in August). Currently it is held in autumn, coinciding with the Pilar festivities, when some days of competition have already been held.

In the first editions, the Trophy was held over several days and with four teams fighting for the final victory, being one of the most important summer tournaments. This would last until 1985 when it began to be played in a single match, except for the 1989, 1990 and 2010 editions.

== Honours ==
| Year | Winners | Runners-up | Third | Fourth |
| 1971 | (Germany) Köln | (Belgium) Royal Sporting Club Anderlecht | (Spain) Real Zaragoza | - |
| 1972 | (Germany) Hamburg SV | (Brazil) Sociedade Esportiva Palmeiras | (Spain) Real Zaragoza | - |
| 1973 | (Germany) Borussia Mönchengladbach | (Bulgaria) PFC CSKA Sofia | (Spain) Real Zaragoza | (England) West Ham |
| 1974 | (Spain) Real Zaragoza | (Germany) Eintracht Frankfurt | (Belgium) FC Molenbeek Brussels Strombeek | (Socialist Federal Republic of Yugoslavia) Partizan Belgrade |
| 1975 | (Spain) Real Zaragoza | (Argentina) Club Atlético Boca Juniors | (Socialist Federal Republic of Yugoslavia) FK Vojvodina | (Portugal) Boavista Futebol Clube |
| 1976 | (Spain) Real Zaragoza | (Poland) Górnik Zabrze | (Socialist Federal Republic of Yugoslavia) OFK Belgrade | (Greece) Olympiacos |
| 1977 | (Bulgaria) PFC CSKA Sofia | (Spain) Real Zaragoza | (Socialist Federal Republic of Yugoslavia) FK Radnički Niš | (Spain) RCD Espanyol |
| 1978 | (Spain) Real Zaragoza | (Uruguay) Club Nacional de Football | (Bulgaria) PFC Sliven | (Socialist Federal Republic of Yugoslavia) KF Trepça Mitrovica |
| 1979 | (Spain) Real Zaragoza | (Socialist Federal Republic of Yugoslavia) NK Dinamo Zagreb | (Hungary) Vasas SC | (Socialist Federal Republic of Yugoslavia) FK Sarajevo |
| 1980 | (Spain) RCD Espanyol | (Spain) Real Zaragoza | (Portugal) Sporting Lisboa | (Socialist Federal Republic of Yugoslavia) Partizan Belgrade |
| 1981 | (Spain) Real Zaragoza | (England) Nottingham Forest Football Club | (Hungary) Tisza Volán SC | (Spain) Club Atlético Osasuna |
| 1982 | (England) Manchester United F.C. | (Spain) Real Zaragoza | (Hungary) MTK Hungária FC | (Hungary) Budapest Honvéd FC |
| 1983 | (Spain) Real Zaragoza | (Mexico) Club América | (England) Aston Villa Football Club | (Romania) Politehnica Timişoara |
| 1984 | (Hungary) Videoton SC | (Chile) Universidad Católica | (Spain) Real Zaragoza | (Uruguay) Defensor Sporting Club |
| 1985 | (Spain) FC Barcelona | (Spain) Real Zaragoza | - | - |
| 1986 | (Spain) Real Zaragoza | (Germany) Köln | - | - |
| 1987 | (Spain) Real Zaragoza | (Czech Republic) Czechoslovakia | - | - |
| 1988 | (Uruguay) Club Atlético Peñarol | (Spain) Real Zaragoza | - | - |
| 1989 | (Spain) Real Zaragoza | (Mexico) Club de Fútbol Atlante | Aragon | - |
| 1990 | (Russia) FC Dinamo Moscow | (Spain) Real Zaragoza | (Spain) Real Betis Balompié | - |
| 1991 | (Spain) Real Zaragoza | (Romania) Dinamo Bucharest | - | - |
| 1992 | (Spain) Real Zaragoza | (Spain) FC Barcelona | - | - |
| 1993 | (Brazil) Club de Regatas Vasco da Gama | (Spain) Real Zaragoza | - | - |
| 1994 | (Spain) Real Zaragoza | (Russia) CSKA Moscow | - | - |
| 1995 | (Spain) Real Zaragoza | (Uruguay) Club Nacional de Football | - | - |
| 1996 | (Spain) Real Zaragoza | (Germany) Hamburg SV | - | - |
| 1997 | (Italy) SS Lazio | (Spain) Real Zaragoza | - | - |
| 1998 | (Italy) Parma | (Spain) Real Zaragoza | - | - |
| 1999 | (Spain) Real Zaragoza | (Netherlands) Feyenoord Rotterdam | - | - |
| 2000 | (Spain) Real Zaragoza | (Italy) Parma | - | - |
| 2001 | (Spain) Real Zaragoza | (Netherlands) FC Twente | - | - |
| 2002 | (Spain) Real Zaragoza | (Spain) Athletic Club | - | - |
| 2003 | (Spain) Real Zaragoza | (Italy) Chievo | - | - |
| 2004 | (Spain) Club Atlético de Madrid | (Spain) Real Zaragoza | - | - |
| 2005 | (Spain) Real Zaragoza | (Spain) Real Madrid Club de Fútbol | - | - |
| 2006 | (Spain) Real Zaragoza | (Italy) Associazione Sportiva Livorno Calcio | - | - |
| 2007 | (Spain) Real Zaragoza | (Italy) Juventus Football Club | - | - |
| 2008 | (Spain) Getafe CF | (Spain) Real Zaragoza | - | - |
| 2009 | (Italy) SS Lazio | (Spain) Real Zaragoza | - | - |
| 2010 | (Spain) Sociedad Deportiva Huesca | (Spain) Real Zaragoza | (Spain) CD Teruel | - |
| 2011 | (Spain) Real Zaragoza | (Spain) RCD Espanyol | - | - |
| 2012 | (Spain) Real Zaragoza | (Spain) RCD Espanyol | - | - |
| 2013 | (Spain) Real Zaragoza | (Spain) Getafe CF | - | - |
| 2014 | (Spain) Villarreal CF | (Spain) Real Zaragoza | - | - |
| 2015 | (Spain) Real Zaragoza | (Spain) Real Sociedad | - | - |
| 2016 | (Spain) Real Zaragoza | (Spain) SD Eibar | - | - |
| 2017 | (Spain) SD Eibar | (Spain) Real Zaragoza | - | - |
| 2018 | (Spain) Levante UD | (Spain) Real Zaragoza | - | - |
| 2019 | (Spain) Real Zaragoza | (Spain) Deportivo Alavés | - | - |
| 2020 | Not celebrated | | - | - |
| 2021 | (Spain) Getafe CF | (Spain) Real Zaragoza | - | - |
| 2022 | Postponed* | | - | - |
| 2023 | (Colombia) Millonarios F.C. | (Spain) Real Zaragoza | - | - |
| 2024 | Not celebrated | | - | - |

== Titles ==
=== Titles by clubs ===
The Real Zaragoza, the organizing team, is the clear dominator of the tournament with 29 titles. It is also the only team that has repeated victory along with Lazio and Getafe. However, it was not until the fourth edition of the tournament, in which his first victory came.

| Teams | Titles | Runners-up | Champion years |
|---|---|---|---|
| (Spain) Real Zaragoza | 29 | 16 | 1974, 1975, 1976, 1978, 1979, 1981, 1983, 1986, 1987, 1989, 1991, 1992, 1994, 1995, 1996, 1999, 2000, 2001, 2002, 2003, 2005, 2006, 2007, 2011, 2012, 2013, 2015, 2016, 2019, 2023 |
| (Spain) Getafe CF | 2 | 1 | 2008, 2021 |
| (Italy) SS Lazio | 2 | 0 | 1997, 2009 |
| (Spain) RCD Espanyol | 1 | 2 | 1980 |
| (Germany) 1. FC Köln | 1 | 1 | 1971 |
| (Germany) Hamburger SV | 1 | 1 | 1972. |
| (Bulgaria) P. F. C. CSKA Sofia | 1 | 1 | 1977 |
| (Spain) FC Barcelona | 1 | 1 | 1985 |
| (Italy) Parma F. C. | 1 | 1 | 1998 |
| (Spain) S. D. Eibar | 1 | 1 | 2017 |
| (Germany) VfL Borussia Mönchengladbach | 1 | 0 | 1973 |
| (England) Manchester United F.C. | 1 | 0 | 1982 |
| (Hungary) Videoton F. C. | 1 | 0 | 1984 |
| (Uruguay) C. A. Peñarol | 1 | 0 | 1988 |
| (Russia) FC Dynamo Moscow | 1 | 0 | 1990 |
| (Brazil) C. R. Vasco da Gama | 1 | 0 | 1993 |
| (Spain) C. Atlético de Madrid | 1 | 0 | 2004 |
| (Spain) S. D. Huesca | 1 | 0 | 2010 |
| (Spain) Villarreal CF | 1 | 0 | 2014 |
| (Spain) Levante UD | 1 | 0 | 2018 |
| (Colombia) Millonarios F.C. | 1 | 0 | 2023 |

=== Titles by country ===
| País | Títulos |
|---|---|
| Spain | 38 |
| Italy | 3 |
| Germany | 3 |
| (Bulgaria) Bulgary | 1 |
| England | 1 |
| Hungary | 1 |
| Uruguay | 1 |
| Russia | 1 |
| Brazil | 1 |
| Colombia | 1 |
