= Fisnik Ademi =

Kosovan former footballer

Personal information
- Date of birth: 5 August 1952 (age 74)
- Place of birth: Peja, DF Yugoslavia
- Position: Midfielder

Youth career
- Besa Pejë

Senior career*
Years	Team	Apps	(Gls)
1969–1972	Besa Pejë		
1972–1987	Trepça	220	(22)
- * Club domestic league appearances and goals

Fisnik Ademi (born 5 August 1952) is a Kosovan former footballer. He was one of the best Kosovan midfielders during his time and part of the golden generation of Trepça.

== Career ==
Ademi was part of Besa Pejë back then known as Buduçnosti before moving to Trepça in 1972. He played for Trepça until 1987. He made 220 appearances, scoring 22 goals from 1972 until 1987.

== Honours ==
Trepça

- Yugoslav Second League: 1976–77
- Yugoslav Cup runner-up: 1977–78
