= Blerim Mula =

Footballer and manager (born 1958)

Personal information
- Full name: Blerim Mula
- Date of birth: 21 October 1958 (age 68)
- Place of birth: Gjakova, FPR Yugoslavia
- Position: Defender

Senior career*
Years	Team	Apps	(Gls)
1984–1985	Vlaznimi	30	(0)
1987–1991	Sakaryaspor	125	(1)
1991–1992	Konyaspor	27	(0)
1993–1995	Erdemir Ereğli Spor	54	(2)
1995–1996	Çerkezköyspor	14	(0)
1996–1998	Sapanca Gençlikspor	50	(0)
Total		300	(3)

Managerial career
- 2011–?: Vëllaznimi
- 2014: Vëllaznimi
- 2019: Vëllaznimi
- * Club domestic league appearances and goals

Blerim Mula (born 21 October 1958) is a football manager and former defender who played for clubs in the former Yugoslavia and Turkey.

== Playing career ==
Born in Gjakova, Mula began playing football for local side FK Vlaznimi. He played one season in the Yugoslav Second League during his tenure with the club.

In 1987, Mula moved to Turkey where he would spend the remainder of his playing career. He first joined Turkish Süper Lig side Sakaryaspor, where he would win the 1987–88 Turkish Cup. Four seasons later, he moved to rivals Konyaspor for one season. After a few seasons playing in the second and third divisions, Mula retired from football at the end of the 1997–98 season.

== Managerial career ==
After retiring from playing football, Mula became a coach. He was appointed manager of KF Vëllaznimi on multiple occasions.
