= Ajet Shosholli =

Kosovan coach and former footballer

Personal information
- Date of birth: 15 April 1945 (age 81)
- Place of birth: Kosovska Mitrovica, DF Yugoslavia
- Position: Midfielder

Youth career
- 1957–1966: Trepça

Senior career*
Years	Team	Apps	(Gls)
1966–1968	Trepça		
1968–1970	Remont		

Managerial career
- 1973–1975: Vushtrria
- 1975–1983: Trepça
- 1983–1984: Vëllaznimi
- 1984–1991: Prishtina
- 1993–2002: Kosovo
- 1995–1996: Shkëndija
- 1999–2000: Prishtina
- 2002–2005: Prishtina
- 2008–2009: Trepça '89 (director)
- 2010–2012: Vëllaznimi
- 2013–2014: Vëllaznimi
- 2014–2015: Trepça
- * Club domestic league appearances and goals

Ajet Shosholli (born 15 April 1945) is a Kosovan coach and former footballer. He coached several teams in Kosovo, especially Prishtina, Trepça and Vëllaznimi who are the most successful teams in the country. Since 2024, he is the general director of Trepça.

== Playing career ==
=== Trepça ===
Born in Mitrovica, Shosholli started his youth career in 1957 for Trepça. In 1966, he finally became part of the senior team where he played until 1968.

=== Remont ===
Shosholli spent his last two years playing for KF Remont Mitrovica which played in the Kosovo Province League.

== Coaching career ==
=== Vushtrria (1973–1975) ===
On 14 August 1973, Shosholli became the head coach of Vushtrria.

=== Trepça (1975–1983) ===
In 1975, Shosholli became one of the five managers of Trepça. Together with Hysni Maxhuni, he reached the final of the Yugoslav Cup in 1978.

=== Kosova (1991–1996) ===
On 14 February 1993, following the breakup of Yugoslavia, Kosovo played a friendly match against Albania in which Shosholli coached Kosovo.

=== Shkëndija (1995–1996) ===
From 1995 until 1996, Shosholli was the head coach of Shkëndija.

=== Vëllaznimi (2013–2014) ===
In 2013, he once again became the head coach of Vëllaznimi.

=== Trepça (2014–2015) ===
On 29 October 2014, he was appointed as the head coach of Trepça of the Kosovo Superleague.

== Honours ==
=== Manager ===
Trepça

- Yugoslav Second League: 1976–77

Shkëndija

- Macedonian Second League: 1995–96

Prishtina

- Kosovo Superleague: 1991–92, 1999–2000, 2003–04
- Kosovar Supercup: 2003–04
