= Rafet Prekazi =

Kosovan football coach (born 1959)

Personal information
- Date of birth: 2 January 1959 (age 67)
- Place of birth: Kosovska Mitrovica, FPR Yugoslavia
- Position: Midfielder

Youth career
- 1970–1975: Remont
- 1975–1976: Trepça

Senior career*
Years	Team	Apps	(Gls)
1976–1984	Trepça	11+	(1+)
1984–1986	Prishtina	40	(1)
1986–1991	Trepça		

Managerial career
- 1993–1995: Dukagjini
- 2000–2005: Trepça '89
- 2011–2013: Trepça
- 2013–2014: Trepça '89
- 2014–2020: Kosovo U-21
- 2015–2016: Trepça
- * Club domestic league appearances and goals

Rafet Prekazi (born 2 January 1959) is a Kosovan coach and former footballer. Since 2024, he is the sporting director at Trepça.

== Playing career ==
He started his youth career for the local club KF Remont Mitrovica and later became part of Trepça. He was part of the golden generation of Trepça which played in the Yugoslav First League. In 1984, he became part of Prishtina where he stayed until 1986 and then returned to his hometown club Trepça.

== Coaching career ==
=== Dukagjini ===
Following Kosova's proclaimed independence, Prekazi started to contribute in the Independent League of Kosovo. From 1993 until 1995, he was the head coach of Dukagjini.

=== Kosovo U-21 ===
From 2014 until 2020, he was the head coach of Kosovo U-21.

== Honours ==
=== Player ===
Trepça

- Yugoslav Second League: 1976–77
- Yugoslav Cup runner-up: 1977–78

Prishtina

- Yugoslav Second League: 1982–83

=== Manager ===
Dukagjini

- Kosovo Superleague: 1993–94

Trepça

- Kosovo First League: 2015–16
