= Dragutin Spasojević =

Montenegrin footballer and manager

Personal information
- Date of birth: 15 February 1934
- Place of birth: Nikšić, Kingdom of Yugoslavia
- Date of death: 21 May 2016 (aged 82)
- Place of death: Podgorica, Montenegro
- Position: Defender

Senior career*
Years	Team	Apps	(Gls)
1959–1960	Sutjeska Nikšić		
1961–1962	Priština	17	(1)

Managerial career
- 1964–1966: Priština
- 1966–1967: Trepča
- 1967–1970: Sloga Kraljevo
- 1970: Spartak Subotica
- 1970–1972: Sutjeska Nikšić
- 1972–1973: Bor
- 1974–1976: Bor
- 1976–1979: Rijeka
- 1979–1981: Budućnost Titograd
- 1983–1984: OFK Beograd
- 1984: Čelik Zenica
- 1987–1988: GOŠK-Jug
- 1989–1990: Sutjeska Nikšić
- 1990: Rad
- 1993: Čukarički
- 1993: Borac Čačak
- 1994: Priština
- 1996–1998: Sutjeska Nikšić
- * Club domestic league appearances and goals

Dragutin Spasojević (15 February 1934 – 21 May 2016) was a Montenegrin football player and manager.

He managed NK Rijeka, FK Bor, NK Čelik Zenica, FK Rad, FK Sutjeska Nikšić, FK Trepča, FK Borac Čačak, FK Budućnost Titograd, OFK Beograd, FK Spartak Subotica, FK Čukarički, NK GOŠK-Jug and FK Sloga Kraljevo. He was also president of the board for FSSCG and FSCG.

He is most famous for winning the 1978 Yugoslav Cup with NK Rijeka.

== Managerial career ==
Spasojević began his coaching career in Prizren, 1962 where he formed a football school for youth players.

With Sloga he won Yugoslav Second League in 1970, but failed to qualify for First League losing to Crvenka. He began coaching Sutjeska Nikšić a year later and won the Second League and gained promotion. He also managed FK Bor two times in 1972–73 and 1974–1976.

Spasojević became manager of NK Rijeka in April 1976 replacing Gojko Zec. He stayed with club for two years accumulating over 100 matches. In 1978 he led the club to the Yugoslav Cup final where Rijeka beat his former club Trepča. The same year he also won the Balkans Cup. He became a club legend after winning the clubs first trophies.

== Personal life ==
He was married to Leposava and father of Krsto, Ilija and Mirko. Spasojević was a big supporter of Sutjeska.

== Managerial statistics ==
Club	From	To	Competition	Record				
Club	From	To	Competition	P	W	D	L	Win %
NK Rijeka	20 August 1976	25 March 1979	First League	89	30	33	26	33.71
NK Rijeka	20 August 1976	25 March 1979	Yugoslav Cup	10	8	1	1	80.00
NK Rijeka	20 August 1976	25 March 1979	Balkans Cup	9	7	0	2	77.78
NK Rijeka	20 August 1976	25 March 1979	European Cup Winners' Cup	4	1	2	1	25.00
NK Rijeka total				112	46	36	30	41.07

*Dates of first and last games under Spasojević; not dates of official appointments

== Honours ==
Sloga Kraljevo

- Yugoslav Second League: 1969–70 (East)

Sutjeska Nikšić

- Yugoslav Second League: 1970–71 (South)

Rijeka

- Yugoslav Cup: 1977–78
- Balkans Cup: 1977–78
