= Nurudeen Abdulai =

Ghanaian professional footballer

Personal information
- Date of birth: 24 June 1997 (age 29)
- Place of birth: Accra, Ghana
- Height: 1.92 m (6 ft 4 in)
- Position: Defender

Team information
- Current team: Besa Kavajë
- Number: 13

Senior career*
Years	Team	Apps	(Gls)
2017–2018	Ashanti Gold	13	(0)
2018–2021	Karela United	21	(0)
2021	Aduana Stars	26	(0)
2022–2023	Nsoatreman		
2023–2024	Trepça	10	(0)
2024–	Besa Kavajë	23	(0)
- * Club domestic league appearances and goals as of 6 June 2024

Nurudeen Abdulai (born 24 June 1997) is a Ghanaian professional footballer who plays as a defender for Besa Kavajë in the Kategoria e Parë. He previously played for Ashanti Gold and Karela United.

== Career ==
=== Ashanti Gold ===
Abdulai played for Obuasi-based club Ashanti Gold before moving to Karela United. He featured in 6 league matches in the 2018 Ghanaian Premier League season before the league was abandoned due to the dissolution of the GFA in June 2018, as a result of the Anas Number 12 Expose.

=== Karela United ===
In September 2018, he was signed by Western Region-based club Karela United by then coach Johnson Smith on an initial two-year contract. He became a key member of the club, as he featured in 7 league matches before the league was put on hold and later cancelled due to the COVID-19 pandemic. He featured in 10 league matches in the first round of the 2020–21 Ghana Premier League and helped them to a first round 1st place league position before joining Aduana Stars in March 2021. He played a total of 26 league matches before leaving the club after his contract expired.

=== Aduana Stars ===
In March 2021, when Abdulai's contract with the club expired he left Karela as a free agent after the first round of the season and signed a 2-year deal with Aduana Stars. He was signed to replace the club's defender Farouk Adams who was in custody and standing trial for allegedly killing a Police officer with a car.

=== Trepça ===
On August 21, 2023, Abdulai signed for the Kosovan club KF Trepça which competes in the First Football League of Kosovo.
