= Luan Prekazi =

Kosovan coach and former footballer

Personal information
- Date of birth: 1 December 1946 (age 79)
- Place of birth: Kosovska Mitrovica, FPR Yugoslavia
- Position: Midfielder

Youth career
- 1955–1963: Trepça

Senior career*
Years	Team	Apps	(Gls)
1963–1967	Trepça		
1967–1969	Partizan	38	(3)
1969–1974	Prishtina		
1975–1977	Trepça		

International career
1967	Kosovo	1	(0)

Managerial career
- 1993–1994: Bashkimi
- 1995–1996: Flamurtari
- 2008–2009: Hysi
- * Club domestic league appearances and goals

Luan Prekazi (born 1 December 1946) is a Kosovan former coach and former footballer.

== Club career ==
Prekazi started his professional career for Trepça in 1963. In 1967, he signed for Partizan of the Yugoslav First League and Inter-Cities Fairs Cup. In 38 league appearances he scored 3 goals. In 1969, he left Partizan and signed for Prishtina where he stayed until 1974. He ended his playing career at his hometown club Trepça in 1977.

== Coaching career ==
From 1993 until 1994 Prekazi coached Bashkimi. He was also the head coach of Flamurtari and Hysi. He was the sporting the director of Prishtina for many years.

== Personal life ==
His younger brother is Xhevat Prekazi, who also played for Partizan.

== Honours ==
=== Player ===
Trepça

- Yugoslav Second League: 1976–77

Partizan

- Yugoslav First League runner-up: 1967–68

=== Manager ===
Flamurtari

- Kosovar Cup: 1995–96

Hysi

- Kosovar Cup: 2008–09
