= Afrim Kuçi =

Kosovo Albanian footballer

Personal information
- Date of birth: 19 May 1970
- Place of birth: Kosovska Mitrovica, SFR Yugoslavia
- Date of death: 9 October 2022 (aged 52)
- Place of death: Germany
- Height: 1.90 m (6 ft 3 in)
- Positions: Defender; defensive midfielder

Youth career
- –1988: Trepça

Senior career*
Years	Team	Apps	(Gls)
1988–1992	Minatori'89		
1992–1993	Kosova Prishtina		
1993–1994	Modo FF		
1994	Siarka Tarnobrzeg	1	(0)
1994–1996	SG Betzdorf		
1996–2000	Sportfreunde Siegen	90	(4)
2000–2001	Eintracht Braunschweig	11	(1)
2001–2004	SV Elversberg	84	(6)
2004	FC Eschborn	0	(0)
Total		+186	(+11)

International career
1998	Albania	0	(0)
- * Club domestic league appearances and goals

Afrim Kuçi (19 May 1970 – 9 October 2022) was a Kosovo Albanian footballer who played as a defender and defensive midfielder.

== Career ==
Kuçi was formed in Kosovo in the youth teams of Trepça and as a senior moved to Minatori'89. Then he moved to Europe where he played in Sweden with Modo FF and after a year he moved to Poland to Siarka Tarnobrzeg and then to Germany to SG Betzdorf and Sportfreunde Siegen. In August 1998, after good performances with Sportfreunde Siegen, Kuçi received a call-up from Albania for the friendly match against Cyprus, but due to some problems he could not play. In 2000, he was transferred to Eintracht Braunschweig and after a year to SV Elversberg. On 9 July 2004, Kuçi who had just joined FC Eschborn was admitted to hospital after suffering a stroke on a football pitch during pre-season match, which caused him to leave from football due to hemiparesis and neurological disorders.
