= Kreshnik Bahtiri =

Kosovan footballer

Personal information
- Full name: Kreshnik Bahtiri
- Date of birth: 29 July 1992 (age 34)
- Place of birth: Lipljan, FR Yugoslavia
- Height: 1.80 m (5 ft 11 in)
- Position: Midfielder

Team information
- Current team: Feronikeli
- Number: 23

Senior career*
Years	Team	Apps	(Gls)
–2016	Ulpiana		
2016–2021	Arbëria	32	(7)
2021–2022	Kukësi	14	(1)
2022–2023	Malisheva	9	(0)
2023	Ulpiana		
2023–2025	Prishtina e Re		
2025–	Feronikeli		
- * Club domestic league appearances and goals as of 20 July 2023

Kreshnik Bahtiri (born 29 July 1992) is a Kosovan professional footballer who plays as a midfielder for Kosovo First League club Feronikeli.

== Club career ==
=== Early career and Arbëria ===
Bahtiri was part of Ulpiana until 2016, where he was also captain. In July 2016, Bahtiri joined Second Football League of Kosovo side Arbëria, where he is appointed captain and for five years helped the team to be promoted first in the First League and then culminating in the Superleague. On 18 September 2020, Bahtiri and a good part of the team made their Superleague debut in a 2–0 away win against Trepça '89, where the first goal of the season, but also of Arbëria in the Superleague was scored by he himself after seventeen minutes of play.

=== Kukësi ===
On 2 July 2021, Bahtiri signed a one-year contract with Kategoria Superiore club Kukësi. On 19 September 2021, he was named as a Kukësi substitute for the first time in a league match against Kastrioti. His debut with Kukësi came three days later in the 2020–21 Albanian Cup first round against Maliqi after being named in the starting line-up. Five days after debut, Bahtiri made his league debut in a 2–2 away draw against Laçi after coming on as a substitute at last minutes in place of Shqiprim Taipi.
