= Hysni Maxhuni =

Kosovan coach and former footballer

Personal information
- Date of birth: 23 March 1942 (age 84)
- Place of birth: Kosovska Mitrovica, German-occupied Serbia

Youth career
- –1959: Trepça

Senior career*
Years	Team	Apps	(Gls)
1959–1971	Trepça		

Managerial career
- 1975–1977: Trepça (assistant)
- 1977–1981: Trepça
- 1984–1987: Prishtina (assistant)
- 1989–1990: Prishtina
- 1995: Shkëndija
- 1995–1996: Novi Pazar
- 2003: Drita
- 2006–2007: Bashkimi
- 2009: Trepça
- 2009–2010: Hysi
- * Club domestic league appearances and goals

Hysni Maxhuni (born 23 March 1942) is a Kosovan coach and former footballer.

== Playing career ==
Maxhuni played for his hometown club Trepça in the 1960s when barely Albanians played for Yugoslav teams due to oppressive laws.

== Coaching career ==
=== Trepça ===
In 1975, he was appointed as an assistant manager for Trepça. In 1977, he managed the team together with Ajet Shosholli and reached the final of the 1977–78 Yugoslav Cup.

=== Prishtina ===
During 1989–1990, Maxhuni was the head coach of Prishtina of the Yugoslav Second League.

=== Shkëndija ===
Maxhuni was the head coach of Shkëndija of the Macedonian Second Football League in 1995.

=== Novi Pazar ===
From 1995 until 1996, he managed Novi Pazar.

=== Drita ===
In 2003, he was the manager of Drita for a short period.

== Honours ==
=== Manager ===
Trepça

- Yugoslav Second League: 1976–77
- Yugoslav Cup runner-up: 1977–78

== Personal life ==
His grandson, Edon Maxhuni, is a professional basketball player.
