= Football in Kosovo =

Football in Kosovo is governed by the Football Federation of Kosovo, which was created in 1946 (80 years ago), as a branch of the Yugoslav Football Association. Prishtina is the club from Kosovo with most participations in the Yugoslav First League. Football is the most popular sport in Kosovo. The Kosovo Superleague is the top division of football in Kosovo. The division was set up in 1945 as a regional league within the Yugoslav football league system.

In 2008, Kosovo declared its independence from Serbia. Until 2016, membership in UEFA and FIFA had been denied due to Kosovo's disputed recognition as an independent state. However, Kosovo was also not a member of the NF Board, which represents non-FIFA territories, including unrepresented cultural groups and unrecognized states. Some football clubs, especially from North Kosovo, refuse to enter the Republic of Kosovo's institutions and continue to be part of the Football Association of Serbia. On 3 May 2016, Kosovo became the 55th member of UEFA after a 28–24 vote in their favour, and on 13 May 2016, Kosovo gained FIFA membership after a 141–23 vote in their favour.

== National football team ==
=== 1945: Kosovo under Yugoslavia ===
On 29 November 1942, Kosovo for the first time in its history played a friendly match as part of the celebrations for the 30th anniversary of the Independence of Albania against Tirana. (Note: The alternative name of the Albania national team that was used during this match.)

=== 1967–1975: First encounters for Kosovo in European football ===
On 8 November 1967, Kosovo, for the first time as autonomous province of SFR Yugoslavia, played a friendly match against Yugoslavia and the match ended with a 3–3 home draw. For Yugoslavia this match was a pre-preparation before the UEFA Euro 1968 qualifying match against Albania.

==== Brotherhood and Unity Tournament ====
Eight years after the match against Yugoslavia, Kosovo in 1975 participated for the first and last time in the Brotherhood and Unity Tournament, which was held in Pristina and Prizren, where they won in all four matches of this tournament against Montenegro (2–0), Bosnia and Herzegovina (2–1), Slovenia (2–0) and Macedonia (1–0) and took first place, also its first and sole success under Yugoslavia for Kosovo.

Year	Round	Pos	Pld	W	D	L	GF	GA
(Socialist Republic of Serbia) Brotherhood and Unity Tournament	Winner	1st	4	4	0	0	7	1
Total	Best: Winner	1/1	4	4	0	0	7	1

=== Efforts for internationalization of Kosovo in FIFA and UEFA ===
In September 2012, Albania international Lorik Cana, along with Swiss internationals Granit Xhaka, Valon Behrami and Xherdan Shaqiri, all of them with Kosovo Albanian origin, wrote a declaration to FIFA President Sepp Blatter, asking him to allow Kosovo to play friendly matches. The declaration was also signed by eight other Albanian footballers hailing from Kosovo: Ahmed Januzi, Alban Meha, Armend Dallku, Burim Kukeli, Etrit Berisha, Fatmire Bajramaj, Lorik Cana, Mërgim Mavraj and Samir Ujkani. On 6 February 2013, FIFA decided to allow Kosovan club teams to play friendly games against clubs from countries whose national teams were members of FIFA. However, it was stipulated that Kosovan clubs and teams could not display national symbols such as the Kosovan flag, emblem, etc., or play the Kosovan anthem. On 5 March 2014, the Kosovan football team was allowed by FIFA to play its first international friendly match, against Haiti. This match ended in a 0–0 draw. After the match against Haiti, six more matches followed in 2014, against Turkey, Senegal, Albania, Equatorial Guinea and Oman respectively. Kosovo would secure their first win ever in an international football match after beating Oman 1–0 with a goal from Albert Bunjaku.

=== Membership in UEFA and FIFA ===
In September 2015, at an UEFA Executive Committee meeting in Malta, the request from Kosovo for admission in UEFA was scheduled for deliberation in the next Ordinary Congress, to be held in Budapest. On 3 May 2016, at the Ordinary Congress, Kosovo was accepted into UEFA after members voted 28–24 in favour of Kosovo. Ten days later, Kosovo was accepted in FIFA during their 66th Congress in Mexico, with 141 votes in favour and 23 against.

=== Tough debut for Kosovo during the 2018 FIFA World Cup qualification ===
Kosovo began to make their debut in the 2018 FIFA World Cup qualification, in Group I where Kosovo was assigned with Croatia, Finland, Iceland, Turkey and Ukraine. Kosovo created its first major surprise, by drawing against the host Finland with a 1–1 draw, thanks to a penalty scored by Valon Berisha, but this it turned to be the lone point of Kosovo during the qualification, as the team lost the remaining games and finished last. Despite that Kosovo had some better results during this Period, they were able to turn an 0–2 result around as Atdhe Nuhiu were able to score a goal also in the 49th Minute but it was offside, butin the 53rd Minute he were able to close the result, despite that the Kosovarians whould still lose this Match at the end.

=== 2017-2020: Kosovo's prime during the UEFA Euros 2020 qualification ===
After a disappointing 2018 FIFA World Cup qualification, Kosovo would than go on to be pretty successful at the 2018–19 UEFA Nations League in which they finished in first place in Group D, in League D in which they faced Azerbaijan, Faroe Islands and Malta. Kosovo secured thea promotion after notably beating Azerbaijan at home with 4–0 in the last game. Kosovo finished the league unbeaten (with four wins and two draws) and secured theirfor themselves a play-off spot forin the UEFA Euro 2020. After the successful Nations League encounter, Kosovo entered the UEFA Euro 2020 qualifying in Group A facing England, Czech Republic, Bulgaria and Montenegro respectively. Kosovo was able to upset the opponents after managing their first win against Bulgaria away in Sofia with 2–3, followed by a surprising win against the Czech Republic with 2–1 at the Fadil Vokrri Stadium in Prishtina. Though the game against England away saw Kosovo taking an early lead in the match to surprise, by a goal from Valon Berisha, they went on to lose 3–5 at the end of the match ending the longest unbeaten run of 15 matches in the football history of Kosovo. In the following match, Kosovo would win once more this time defeating Montenegro with 2–0. After that, they faced the Czech Republic away. Despite a surprising lead by a header from Atdhe Nuhiu they were not able to hold on the result and eventually lose close with 2-1 the decider for the UEFA Euro 2020 campaign. Kosovo finished their qualifying campaign in third place with eleven points. In the UEFA Euro 2020 qualifying play-offs Kosovo faced North Macedonia in the Toše Proeski Arena in Skopje. The match itself was very close but North Macedonia would win this match, ending Kosovo's dreams for a debut participation at the UEFA Euro 2020 for them.

== Club football in Kosovo ==
=== Kosovos under Yugoslavia ===
The most popular sport in Kosovo is football. The playing of football in Kosovo is documented since at least 1914. However, only inIn 1922 were the two first football clubs were formed,: FC Gjakova and FC Prishtina. Until 1926 the clubs competed within the several levels of the Belgrade Football Subassociation, and after 1926, clubs from Kosovo were integrated into the newly formed Skopje Football Subassociation. The subassociations organised different levels of leagues which served as qualification leagues for the Yugoslav championship. From 1945 until 1991, football in the former Yugoslavia advanced so fast that in 1946 the Football Federation of Kosovo was formed as a subsidiary of the Football Federation of Yugoslavia. The most successful team from Kosovo in the first league of Yugoslavia was FC Prishtina, while KF Trepça was part of the league for one year. In 1991 the Football Federation of Kosovo was refounded after all football players from Kosovo were banned from the First League in Yugoslavia. The first game was held in KF Flamurtari's stadium on 13 September 1991 in Pristina, which also marked the start of the first independent championship in Kosovo. The governing body in Kosovo is mainly responsible for the national team and for most of the main cup competitions.

The two main clubs in football are FC Prishtina and KF Trepça who have achieved great success in football. The football club Prishtina FC was founded in 1922, while KF Trepça was founded ten years later in 1932. KF Trepça was part of the 1977–78 championship in the former Yugoslavia League in football. One year later they reached huge success since they were able to play in the finals for the former Yugoslavia Cup against HNK Rijeka in which they lost close. They became the only Kosovan Football club ever to reach the finals in the Yugoslav Cup. FC Prishtina became the first member of the league in 1983, and it achieved an impressive victory after beating Red Star in Belgrade with 3–1.

1983–84 Yugoslav First League starting lineup vs. Red Star Belgrade during their famous 1-3 away win (4–4–2)

During this time Fadil Vokrri impressed all with his talent as he was part of so-called "Golden Generation" of Prishtina. They would finish their first season in 8th place. FC Prishtina in the same season played in the Mitropa Cup, in which they came runners up to Eisenstadt from Austria. In the following seasons Prishtina were able to compete in the league until their last season in 1988. In the 1987–88 Yugoslav Cup Prishtina reached the semifinals, in which they would lose against Borac Banja Luka after penalties.

=== 1991- From indenpendence to first UEFA Club Football achievements ===
Currently, Kosovo has a football league system which incorporates a number of clubs. The top division, the Raiffeisen Super League, has 12 teams. The league was founded in 1945 and is organized by the Football Federation of Kosovo. The other three professional divisions are the first league which includes 16 teams, and the second and third league. There are also semi-professional and amateur football clubs that are active as well. The main cup competition in Kosovo is the Republic of Kosovo Cup, which is open to every men's football team that is part of the Football Federation of Kosovo. The most successful clubs are FC Prishtina (twenty championship titles), KF Vëllaznimi (eight championship titles), KF Trepça (seven championship titles), KF Liria (five championship titles), and KF Besa (three championship titles). FC Ballkani being the most recent champion to win (three back to back Championship titles) from the season 2021-22, 2022-23 until the 2023-24 saison to win for the third time straight, in the history of the football club from Suhareka. Another notable Football club of Kosovo is FC Drita from Gjilan, who won the Superleague of Kosovo four times most recently in the saison 2024-25.

The first unofficial Championship in Kosovo was held in 1991 in which 12 clubs participated. After some years without UEFA Club European football Kosovo was finally recognized by the UEFA in 2016. FC Ballkani became the first Kosovan football Club to qualify for an UEFA Competition, as they beat KF Shkupi in the play-off round away and home to take place for the Groupstage of the 2022–23 UEFA Europa Conference League. In Group G Ballkani faced in Prishtina in the debut CFR Cluj from Romania. They drew their first ever UEFA Club competition game with 1-1 thanks to a goal from Armend Thaqi, securing Kosovo's first ever points in a UEFA club competition. After a close loss to Slavia Prague away from home, Ballkani would than secure Kosovo, maiden win in a UEFA competition as they beat Turkish side Sivasspor with an entertaining 3–4 win away in Turkey. Despite some good performances Ballkani could not progress further as they secure only four points in the process, finishing in last place. It is still Kosovo's highest European club football success, in the history of the country.

Ballkani also secured its first ever win for the Country in the UEFA Champions League qualifying after beating in the first leg Bulgarian Football Champions Ludogorets Razgrad with 2–0 in Pristina. After they lost to Ludogorets Razgrad away from home. Ballkani were able to win their next five matches in a row in the 2023–24 UEFA Europa Conference League qualifying against Larne F.C. 3-1 and away with 4-0 as well. They beat Lincoln Red Imps F.C. in the following third round from Gibraltar with 2–0 at home and 3–1 away, to qualify for the Playoffs for the second year running. In the Playoffs Ballkani were able to beat Bate Borisov from Belarus at home in the first leg with 4-1 despite the loss away from home with 0-1 they would qualify still for the 2023–24 UEFA Europa Conference League for the second straight time as a Football Club in the history of Kosovo. They won their second Match in the Club History after Beating GNK Dinamo Zagreb at home 2–0 to secure Kosovo's most recent win at this competition.

In Europe FC Drita is known for their great results at previous seasons, as they nearly overcome the well known side Feyenoord Rotterdam in two legs, losing away with 2–3 in the 2021–22 UEFA Europa Conference League qualifying phase and play-off round despite leading with goals from Marko Simonovski and Astrit Fazliu in the process. Kosovo strongest encounter in recent history. FC Drita impress the following year again, as they draw away from home against the well known Czech Republic side of Viktoria Plzeň in the 2023–24 UEFA Europa Conference League qualifying. Drita reached the second round of the second round after Beating Differdange the round prior. FC Drita qualified In this years Conference League after beating FC Differdange 03 again in the Playoffs 3–1 on aggregate. FC Drita made history as the second Kosovan Football to qualify for the UEFA Conference League in their country's club Football History.

== Honours ==
=== National football team ===
- UEFA European Championship:
  - Playoffs (1): UEFA Euro 2020 qualifying play-offs.
  - Promotion (2): 2018–19 UEFA Nations League D, 2024–25 UEFA Nations League League C
- Kosovo national football team: being 15 Matches unbeaten between 2017 and 2019 winning 11 Matches out of it.
- Unofficial Football World Championships: Kosovo became the Champion in this Championship after beating Sweden at home 2–0. They are the current holders after drawing 1–1 to Switzerland at home.
  - (5 Matches, three Wins and two Draws)

=== Achievements in club football ===
- UEFA Conference League:
  - Groupstage (3): FC Ballkani in 2022-23 and 2023–24, as well as FC Drita in 2025-26
- Mitropa Cup:
  - Runners Up (1): FC Prishtina in the 1983–84 Mitropa Cup.
- Yugoslav Cup:
  - Runners Up (1): by KF Trepça in 1977-78.
  - Semifinalist (1): FC Prishtina in 1987-88.

=== Achievements in youth football ===
- Valais Youth Cup
  - 4th place (1): at the 2013 Valais Youth Cup in Switzerland for the Kosovo national under-21 football team

== League system ==
=== Men's ===
Level	Leagues/Divisions			
1	Kosovo Superleague (10 clubs)			
2	Kosovo First League (18 clubs)			
3	Kosovo Second League (16 clubs)			
4	Kosovo Third League – Group A (16 clubs)		Kosovo Third League – Group B (18 clubs)	
4	Dukagjini Plain's Group A (8 clubs)	Kosovo Plain's Group A (8 clubs)	Dukagjini Plain's Group B (10 clubs)	Kosovo Plain's Group B (8 clubs)

=== Women's ===
Level	Leagues/Divisions
1	Kosovo Superleague (Various by season, currently 8)
2	Kosovo First League (Various by season, currently 5)

Albania national football team

== Kosovar footballers ==
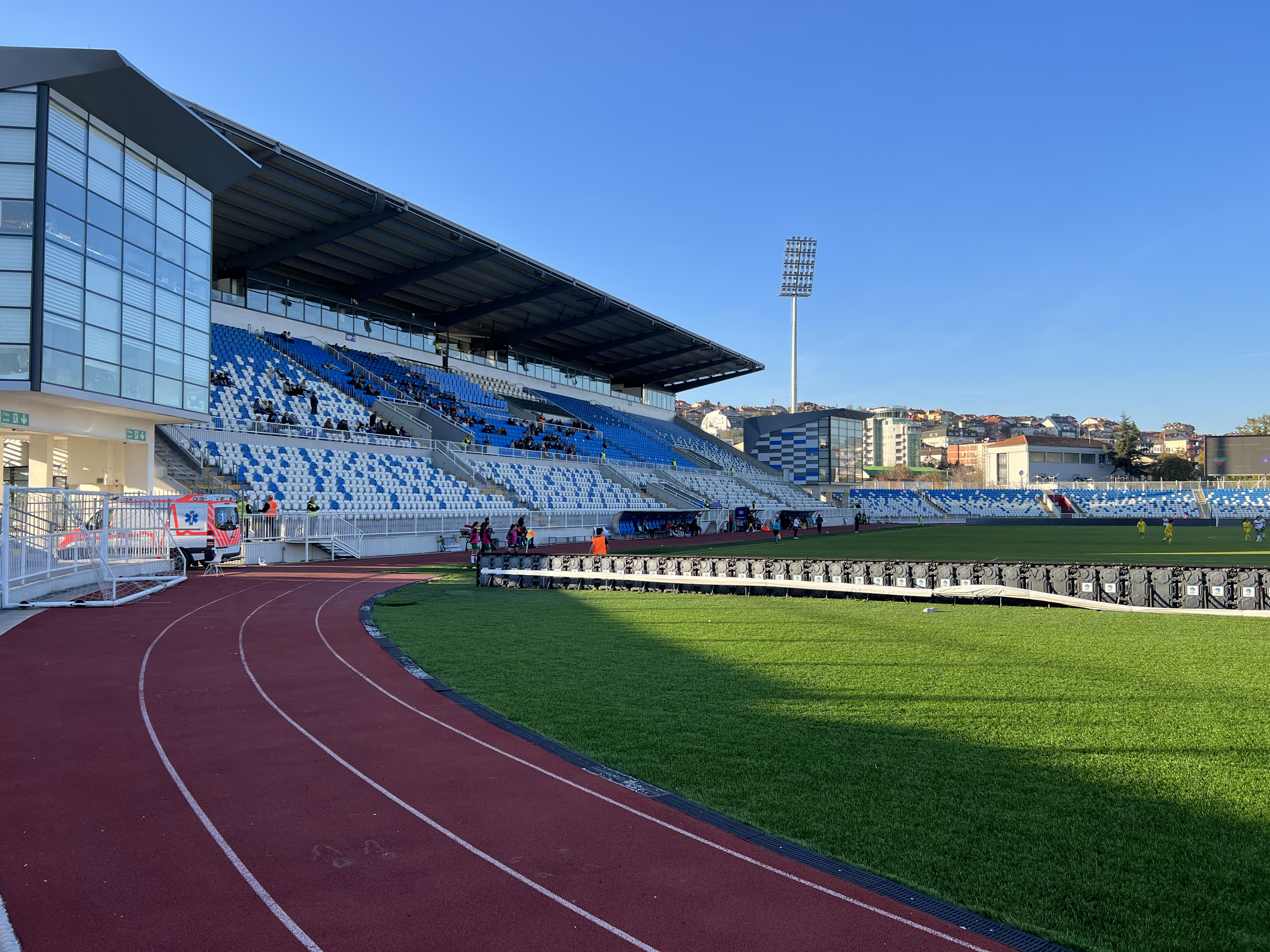
The "Fadil Vokrri" Stadium, the biggest stadium in Pristina

There are several ethnic Albanians from Kosovo who have played, or are playing, football for other national teams. Lorik Cana, who last played for French side Nantes, and would represent the Albania national football team. Valon Behrami is a Kosovo-born Switzerland national football team player for Udinese Calcio. Shefki Kuqi, who last played for Premier League side Newcastle United, is a naturalized citizen of Finland. Xhevat Prekazi, best known for his career with Turkish side Galatasaray S.K., is a naturalized citizen of Turkey. Xherdan Shaqiri is an ethnic Albanian born in Kosovo who plays internationally for the Switzerland national team and played for Premier League side Liverpool. Granit Xhaka is a Swiss-born footballer who plays for the Swiss national team and Bundesliga side Bayer Leverkusen, originally from Kosovo of Albanian descent.

The most famous player in women's football from Kosovo is the former German international Fatmire Alushi, who last played for French side Paris Saint-Germain, she is married to Enis Alushi, a former Kosovo international.

Naim Kryeziu born in Mitrovica in Kosovo started his long footballing career in SK Tirana where he played for six seasons winning four Kategoria Superiore between 1934 and 1939 as well as one Albanian Cup title in 1938–39. He then played for Roma between 1939 and 1947 scoring 27 goals and winning with them the 1941–42 Serie A title. His biggest achievement in his football career. Being the first Albanian footballer to win a Serie A title. He would later play successfully for S.S.C. Napoli scoring in five seasons 39 goals for the Gli Azzurris. Before retiring his footballing career in 1954. He scored 68 goals in the Seria A and is to this day one of the most successful Albanian footballers in the football history in Europe.

He later started a coaching career, serving also as AS Roma head coach for a short time during the 1963–64 season as a replacement for Alfredo Foni. he would coach A.S. Roma once more between 1970 and 1973 in his career.

Riza Lushta is a well known footballer from Kosovo. He started his football career in KF Tirana where he won the Kategoria Superiore four times in six seasons. He would then play for Seria A side S.S.C. Bari for the upcoming season; he scored three times in sixteen matches. His performances with Bari attracted the interest of Juventus Turin which he joined in 1940 after a year with Bari. He would play for the Old Lady for five seasons. His most successful season came in the 1941–42 Serie A where he scored 15 goals for Juve being the highest foreigner goalscorer in the Seria in that particular season. Lushta made history as he won with Juventus Turin the 1941–42 Coppa Italia. He is known for a hattrick he scored against A.C. Milan in the second leg of the finals. Riza Lushta would be the first Albanian footballer to be a record goalscorer in the Coppa Italia with 8 goals in 6 matches

== Attendances ==
The average attendance per top-flight football league season and the club with the highest average attendance:

Season	League average	Best club	Best club average
2023-24	751	KF Llapi	1,989
2022-23	815	KF Llapi	1,483
