= Dragan Mutibarić =

Serbian footballer

Personal information
- Full name: Dragomir Mutibarić
- Date of birth: 10 November 1946 (age 79)
- Place of birth: Sombor, FPR Yugoslavia
- Position: Goalkeeper

Youth career
- Bečej
- Srem

Senior career*
Years	Team	Apps	(Gls)
1966–1975	Vardar	239	(0)
1975–1976	Schalke 04	2	(0)
1976–1977	BSV 07 Schwenningen	22	(0)
1977–1978	Trepča	21	(0)
1979–1984	Vardar	23	(0)
1984–1988	Teteks	44	(0)
1988–1989	Makedonija G.P.	49	(0)
1989–1995	Mikrogranulat Gostivar	57	(0)
Total		457	(0)

International career
1967–1969	Yugoslavia U21	5	(0)
1969–1970	Yugoslavia	10	(0)

Managerial career
- 1995–2006: Vardar (goalkeeper coach)
- 2006–2008: Rabotnički (youth team coach)
- * Club domestic league appearances and goals

Dragomir "Dragan" Mutibarić (Serbian Cyrillic: Драгомир Мутибарић; born 10 November 1946) is a Serbian retired footballer who played as a goalkeeper.

== Career ==
Born in Sombor, SR Serbia, Mutibarić begin his career in 1960 in FK Bečej and afterwards, as a perspective goalkeeper, he signed for lower league FK Srem. It was in this period, more precisely in 1964, that he begin playing for the Yugoslav U21 team with whom he won the 1968 UEFA European U23 Cup.

In 1966, he moved to Skopje and signed with FK Vardar playing back then in the Yugoslav First League. He stayed there nine straight seasons playing a total of 239 league matches. In 1975, he moved to Germany and played one season with FC Schalke 04 in the German Bundesliga. Next season he played with another German club, BSV 07 Schwenningen, before returning in 1977 to sign with Trepča who was playing their first historical season in the top Yugoslav League. That season, the club ended up relegated and after playing another season this time in the Second League he left the club and returned to FK Vardar where he played five further seasons. In 1984, he signed with FK Teteks where he played until 1988 before signing with lower league FK Makedonija Gjorče Petrov where, despite his already advanced age, he made a record of having 1,084 minutes without conceding a goal. He finished his career at age of 49 playing for FK Mikrogranulat Gostivar playing in Vardar Regional League.

Mutibarić played ten matches for the Yugoslavia national team. He debuted on 26 February 1969 in a friendly match against Sweden in 1969.

He played over 600 matches for Vardar, and is considered one of the Macedonian football legends by the Football Federation of Macedonia.
