= FC Vushtrria =

Football club in Kosovo

Vushtrria
- Full name: Football Club Vushtrria
- Nickname: Gladiatorët (The Gladiators)
- Founded: 9 May 1922; 104 years ago
- Ground: Ferki Aliu Stadium
- Capacity: 6,500
- Chairman: Rrahman Rama
- Manager: Fitim Llapashtica
- League: Kosovo Superleague
- 2025–26: Kosovo First League, 1st of 18 (promoted)
- Website: http://llamkosfc.com
Home colours	Away colours

Football Club Vushtrria is a football club based in Vushtrri, Kosovo. The club was founded in 1922, and currently play their home games at the 7,000 seat capacity Ferki Aliu Stadium in the city of Vushtrri. Notable players to have played for the club include former Albania internationals Armend Dallku and Ahmed Januzi, and Kosovo international Milot Rashica.

== History ==
FC Vushtrria was founded in 1922 and is the oldest football club in Kosovo. It has been competing domestically in Kosovo ever since. Throughout the years after World War II, Vushtrri became well known for the production of youth players within the club. Many of these players were transferred to other Kosovar clubs such as Prishtina and Trepça due to them playing in former Yugoslav First League. In the 1960s, the club was known as Radniçki Vushtrri/Radnički Vučitrn. The name of the club was changed in the early 1970s to Kosova Vushtrri.

In 2012, the club was purchased by local steel galvanising plant, Llamkos GalvaSteel. When the club was taken over by Llamkos GalvaSteel and the Core Group, there were immediate investments made which resulted in the club winning their 2013–14 league title, which was the first in its history. Llamkos GalvaSteel then distanced itself from the club as did the club's owner Jeton Sadiku, leaving the financing and management in the hands of the Vushtrri municipality.

== Supporters ==
Their supporters are known as Forca and support all clubs with the name Vushtrria. Forca's main rivals are Torcida of KF Trepça.

== Players ==
=== Current squad ===
As of 1 September 2026

Note: Flags indicate national team as defined under FIFA eligibility rules; some limited exceptions apply. Players may hold more than one non-FIFA nationality.

No.	Pos.	Nation	Player
1	GK	KOS	Drilon Përçuku
2	MF	KOS	Bledion Pllana
3	DF	KOS	Orik Morina
4	DF	KOS	Jon Miftari
5	DF	ALB	Klejdi Paloka
7	FW	KOS	Dardan Ademi
8	MF	KOS	Anis Kollari
9	FW	KOS	Urim Statovci
10	MF	KOS	Albijon Shurdhiqi
11	FW	KOS	Lis Demiri
12	MF	KOS	Reis Maxhuni
14	MF	KOS	Lis Behrami
16	DF	KOS	Ardian Gashi
17	MF	KOS	Auron Hamiti
18	DF	KOS	Ardi Ajdini
19	MF	KOS	Krenar Halili

No.	Pos.	Nation	Player
20	FW	KOS	Daut Maxhuni (captain)
21	DF	KOS	Rigon Spahiu
22	FW	GER	Kim Sané
23	MF	KOS	Andi Mehmeti
24	FW	KOS	Ardit Hasani
25	DF	KOS	Gentian Emini
26	DF	KOS	Arbnor Musa
27	DF	KOS	Leutrim Islami
28	MF	KOS	Rrezon Gashi
29	MF	KOS	Erion Dobërdoli
34	MF	KOS	Kreshnik Bahtiri
45	DF	BIH	Haris Ibrišagić (on loan from Llapi)
66	MF	SRB	Engjëll Sylejmani
70	FW	KOS	Dion Sahiti
91	GK	ALB	Marvin Brozi
99	GK	KOS	Dimal Isufi

== Historical list of coaches ==
- (Socialist Federal Republic of Yugoslavia) Ajet Shosholli (Feb 1973 - 1975)
- (Kosovo) Ismet Munishi (Mar 2013 - Oct 2014)
- (Kosovo) Bekim Shotani (Jul 2015 - 7 Dec 2015)
- (Kosovo) Isa Sadriu (7 Dec 2015 - 12 Jan 2016)
- (Kosovo) Rizvan Jetullahu (12 Jan 2016 - Apr 2016)
- (Kosovo) Bekim Shotani (13 Apr 2016 - May 2016)
- (Kosovo) Isa Sadriu (28 Jun 2017 - 2 Jun 2018)
- (Albania) Samuel Nikaj (14 Jun 2018 - 23 Jun 2019)
- (Kosovo) Bekim Shotani (30 Jun 2019 - Sep 2019)
- (Italy) Antonio Toma (8 Sep 2019 - 22 Oct 2019)
- (Kosovo) Fitim Llapashtica (22 Oct 2019 - )
