= Vahedin Ajeti =

Kosovar Albanian footballer

Personal information
- Full name: Vahedin Ajeti
- Date of birth: December 30, 1960 (age 65)
- Place of birth: Titova Mitrovica, FPR Yugoslavia
- Position: Right midfielder

Senior career*
Years	Team	Apps	(Gls)
1977–1981	Trepça	23	(1)
1981–1983	Liria Prizren	52	(14)
1983–1984	Priština	5	(1)
1984–1985	Trepça	12	(2)
1985–1986	Novi Pazar	5	(0)
1986–1991	Trepça		

Managerial career
- 2019: Fortuna Wiener Neustädter SC
- 2020–2021: SC Katzelsdorf
- * Club domestic league appearances and goals

Vahedin Ajeti (born December 30, 1960) is a former Yugoslav footballer.

Born in Titova Mitrovica, SAP Kosovo, SR Serbia, he played with several clubs in the Yugoslav First and Second leagues, namely, KF Trepça, KF Liria Prizren, KF Prishtina and FK Novi Pazar.

In 2018 he has been named chief scout of the Football Federation of Kosovo with main responsibility for the German-speaking regions in Europe.
