= KF Hysi =

Football club in Kosovo

- Full name: Klubi Futbollistik Hysi
- Nickname: Llapjanët (Llapjanë)
- Founded: 2002; 23 years ago
- Dissolved: 2014
- Ground: Stadiumi Merdar
- Capacity: 2,000
Home colours	Away colours

KF Hysi (Klubi Futbollistik Hysi) was a football club based in Podujevë, in the District of Pristina, Kosovo, that was founded in 2002.

== History ==
They were in the top division of football in Kosovo, the Raiffeisen Superliga. KF Hysi won their promotion from the second division, Liga e Parë, to the top division, then called Kosovar Superliga, during the 2005–06 season.

KF Hysi was coached by Adil Vokrri, the brother of the most famous Kosovar Albanian football player Fadil Vokrri and by the well-known Kosovar football coach, Hysni Maxhuni and Luan Prekazi. Chief executive of the club was Arbnor Morina. Academy coordinator was another Kosovar football legend, Luan Prekazi.

The club was member of the Hysi Group, one of the biggest companies in Kosovo, that are under the ownership of Mr. Isen Sadiku. They were the only private football club in the elite division of Kosovo. KF Hysi opened its new ground in Merdar, near Podujevë, in 2007.

In the 2008–09 season, KF Hysi won the Kosovar Football Cup against the reigning league champions FC Prishtina. In the 2010–11 season, KF Hysi won their first and only Football Superleague of Kosovo title under coach Fadil Ademi.

=== Bankruptcy ===
The club withdrew from the league and ended its membership of the Kosovan FA in February 2014 due to financial issues.

== Honours ==
KF Hysi honours
Type	Competition	Titles	Seasons/Years
Domestic	Football Superleague of Kosovo	1	2010–11
Domestic	Kosovar Cup	1	2008–09
