= Adem Jashari Olympic Stadium =

Multi-purpose stadium in Mitrovica, Kosovo

- Stadiumi Olimpik Adem Jashari
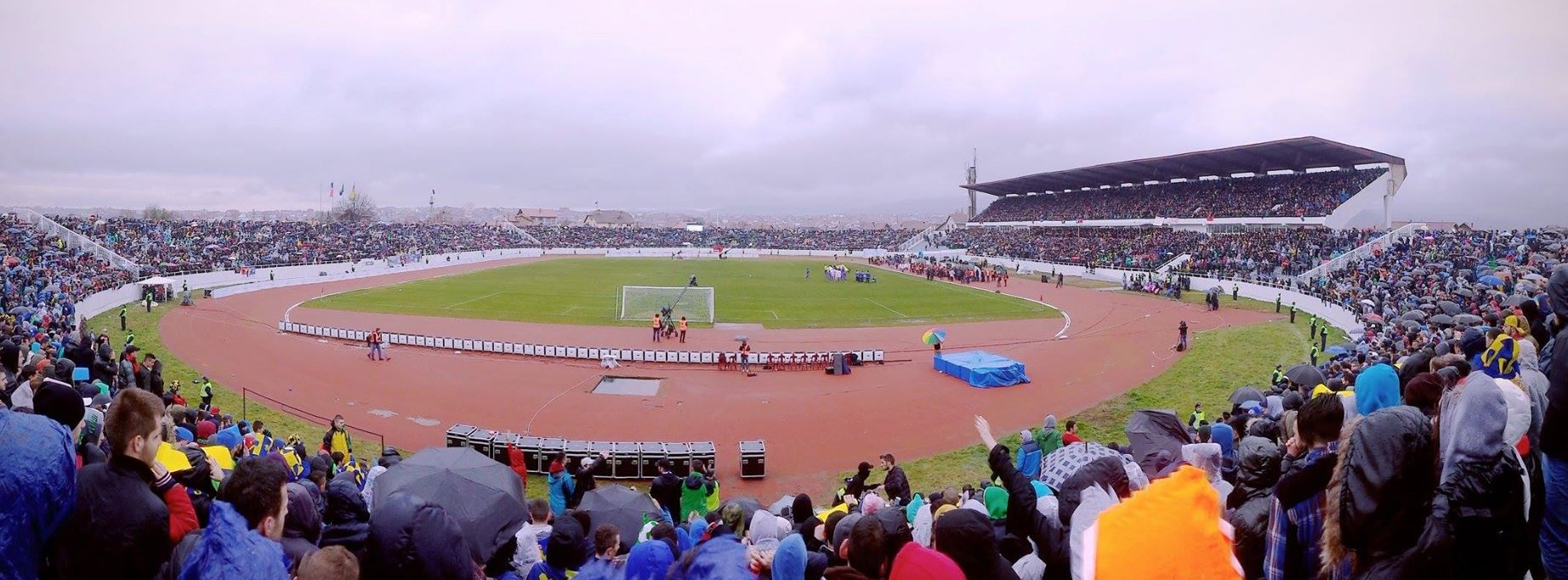
- UEFA
- Interactive map of Adem Jashari Olympic Stadium
- Former names: Trepça/Trepča Stadium (until 1999)
- Location: Mitrovica, Kosovo
- Coordinates: 42.882101°N 20.850997°E
- Owner: Municipality of Mitrovica
- Operator: KF Trepça
- Capacity: 16,300
- Surface: Grass
- Scoreboard: LED
- Record attendance: 25,000
- Field size: 105 by 68 metres (114.8 yd × 74.4 yd)

Construction
- Built: 1970s
- Opened: 1979
- Renovated: 2014, 2017, 2019–ongoing
- Closed: 2019–ongoing
- Cost: €18,24 million (Note: The 2014 (first) renovation cost €740,000, the 2017 (second) renovation cost €1.5 million, while the third (2019–ongoing) renovation cost €16 million (€12.5 million in the first phase and €3.2 million in the second phase).)
- Architect: ALB-Architect

Tenants
- KF Trepça (until 1989, 1999–present); FK Trepča (1989–1999); KFF Mitrovica (selected matches); Kosovo national football teams (selected matches)

The Adem Jashari Olympic Stadium (Albanian: Stadiumi Olimpik Adem Jashari) is a multi-purpose stadium in Mitrovica, Kosovo, which is used mostly for football matches and has been the home ground of the Kosovan football club KF Trepça since 1999. The stadium has a capacity of around 18,500 after renovation is completed. This stadium, built in 1938, was known as Trepça/Trepča Stadium until 1999. After the Kosovo War, the stadium was renamed in honour of Adem Jashari, one of the founders of the Kosovo Liberation Army.

== History ==
=== Club History ===
The Adem Jashari Olympic stadium has always been the home of a football club representing Trepça. From 1989 until 1999, the football club FK Trepča called the stadium its home until the Kosovo War, consequently making the club relocate to North Mitrovica. KF Trepça and FK Trepča both claim the heritage of the Yugoslavian club. From 1999, KF Trepça regularly played their home games in the stadium. To this day both clubs still exist using the same identities but with FK Trepca being a member of the Football Association of Serbia whilst KF Trepca is a member of the Football Federation of Kosovo.

=== International matches ===
On 31 October 1979, it hosted a UEFA Euro 1980 qualifying match of Yugoslavia against Romania and finished with the result 2–1. On 5 March 2014, after 35 years hosted the first permitted by FIFA match of the Kosovo against Haiti and finished with the result 0–0.

#	Date	Competition	Opponent	Score	Att.	Ref
Yugoslavia (1946–1992)
1.	31 October 1979	UEFA Euro 1980 qualifying	Romania	2–1	24,397	
Kosovo (from 2014)
1.	5 March 2014	Friendly	Haiti	0–0	17,000	
2.	21 May 2014	Friendly	Turkey	1–6	17,000	
3.	13 November 2017	Friendly	Latvia	4–3	5,116	

=== Inauguration ===
On 4 July 2017, after renovation was held a qualifying match for 2017–18 UEFA Champions League against Faroese club Víkingur Gøta. Playing for the first time at the recently refurbished Adem Jashari Olympic Stadium.

4 July 2017
18:00

Trepça'89 (Kosovo)	1–4	(Faroe Islands) Víkingur Gøta
Florent Hasani 65'	Report	Sorin Anghel 37'; Perparim Islami 40' (o.g.); Sølvi Vatnhamar 52', 59'

Attendance: 12,000
Referee: Alexander Harkam (Austria)

Trepça'89	Víkingur Gøta

GK	20	(Kosovo) Enis Manxholli
LB	13	(Kosovo) Arbër Potoku
CB	22	(Kosovo) Argjend Mustafa
CB	23	(Kosovo) Ilir Izmaku (yellow card) 90'
RB	21	(Kosovo) Perparim Islami 40' (o.g.) (substituted off) 57'
DM	17	(Kosovo) Ylber Maloku
DM	25	(Kosovo) Rron Broja
CM	11	(Kosovo) Fiton Hajdari (yellow card) 35' (substituted off) 57'
CM	5	(Kosovo) Kushtrim Lushtaku (yellow card) 62' (substituted off) 71'
CM	8	(Kosovo) Florent Hasani 65'
CF	19	(Kosovo) Blerand Kurtishaj (yellow card) 31' (yellow-red card) 33'
Substitutions:
GK	12	(Kosovo) Enes Çitaku
FW	7	(Kosovo) Hasan Hyseni
MF	10	(Kosovo) Shpëtim Idrizi (substituted on) 71'
MF	15	(Kosovo) Muharrem Jashari
FW	19	(Nigeria) Odi Henry Chibueze (substituted on) 57' (yellow card) 89'
DF	29	(Ghana) Asare Richard
FW	99	(Nigeria) Otto John (substituted on) 57'
Manager:
(North Macedonia) (Albania) Zekirija Ramadani

GK	1	(Faroe Islands) Elias Rasmussen
LB	3	(Faroe Islands) Hanus Jacobsen
CB	13	(Faroe Islands) Erling Jacobsen
CB	14	(Faroe Islands) Atli Gregersen
RB	21	(Faroe Islands) Gert Hansen
DM	19	(Faroe Islands) Sorin Anghel (yellow card) 29' (goal) 37' (substituted off) 56'
DM	16	(Faroe Islands) Hans Jørgin Djurhuus (yellow card) 44' (substituted off) 55'
CM	9	(Serbia) Filip Đorđević (yellow card) 67'
CM	24	(Faroe Islands) Gunnar Vatnhamar
CM	10	(Faroe Islands) Sølvi Vatnhamar 52', 59'
CF	30	(Nigeria) Adeshina Lawal (substituted off) 82'
Substitutions:
GK	25	(Faroe Islands) Bárður á Reynatrøð
FW	2	(Faroe Islands) Andreas Olsen (substituted on) 82'
FW	10	(Faroe Islands) Heðin Hansen (substituted on) 55'
MF	15	(Faroe Islands) Jákup Olsen
DF	18	(Faroe Islands) Ási Rasmussen
DF	20	(Faroe Islands) Hans Jákup Lervig (substituted on) 56'
FW	22	(Faroe Islands) Arnbjørn Svensson
Manager:
(Faroe Islands) Sámal Erik Hentze

=== Renovations ===
In 2024, the stadium underwent a complete renovation. The works are being carried out by the Ministry of Culture, Youth and Sports (MCYS) and are aimed at elevating the stadium to UEFA's 4th category standards. This renovation involves significant upgrades to meet international FIFA requirements and improve the facility's infrastructure.
