= KF Vëllaznimi Gjakovë =

Association football club in Kosovo

KF Vëllaznimi
- Full name: Klubi Futbollistik Vëllaznimi
- Nicknames: Kuqezinjët e Jakoves (The Red and Blacks of Jakova)
- Short name: VËLL
- Founded: 1927; 99 years ago
- Ground: Gjakova City Stadium
- Capacity: Currently being renovated;13,800 to 14,500
- Owner: Gjakova Municipality
- President: Gazmend Boshnjaku
- Manager: Leotrim krasniqi
- League: Kosovo First League
- 2024–25: Kosovo First League – Group A, 4th of 10
- Website: www.kfvellaznimi.com
Home colours	Away colours

Klubi i Futbollit Vëllaznimi (transl. Football Club Vëllaznimi), known simply as Vëllaznimi, is a football club based in Gjakova, Kosovo. They currently play in the second division of football in Kosovo, First Football League of Kosovo.

== History ==
Establishment of KF Vëllaznimi (1927) From the "Sword of Kosovo" to today's Brotherhood, a history of nine decades.

Vëllaznimi football club has not had the opportunity to play in the Champions League or UEFA, but the players and talents that came out of this team have played in the Champions League (Besnik Hasi, Ardian Kozniku) and in the 1998 World Cup Ardian Koznik, who defended the colors of Croatia).

Gjakova club or the pride of the city as the residents call it is one of the teams with the most titles won in Kosovo, but it is also known as one of the oldest clubs in Kosovo. Until 1924, the people of Gjakova had not felt the "pleasure" of the football, as Faik Dushi called it, the man who replaced the improvised ball made of wool and rags with the real thing.

Dushi at that time had brought the ball from the capital of Croatia, Zagreb for the first time to his hometown. The first ball had arrived, but when played with it when there were no football fields. But for several years he had rolled through the stone alleys of the city, until 1927, when the first club was formed, which took the name "Sword of Kosovo". Later this name was replaced with "Pashtriku" and "Ylli I kuq", to end with the name that still bears today "Vëllaznimi".

Besides Dushi, the names of Selim Muhaxhiri, Sokol Dobroshi, Ismet Stavilec, Qazim Damonaga, Sherif Lluhani, Iljaz Berisha, Qamil Zhubi, Bektash Guska, Nimon Mulaj are also mentioned in the history of the Gjakova club. These were the initiators of the club, but also the first footballers who in the promotional match defeated the team of Prizren, with results 2–0.

Football matches, as claimed by the participants at the time, were initially held in "Fushë të Tyrbës". Later, they were played on the site of the former military barracks, and most recently, since the 1950s, at the city stadium which was built in those years. During these decades of football development in Gjakova, there have been various difficulties, but it has never stopped its activity. On the contrary, it has only been massing both in terms of the number of athletes and sports workers, as well as in terms of the number of clubs.

In addition to the oldest club 'Vëllaznimi', in Gjakova, its activity has meanwhile been developed by several other football clubs. Thus, for a time, K.F. ‘Deva’. Later, in 1961, within the IT 'Emin Duraku', the football club 'Gjakova' was founded, which still operates today. For a while, the football club ‘Metali ku’ also operated, as well as some village clubs that competed in the Municipal League that operated until 1991. During these 70 years of activity, Gjakova football has achieved various successes. Undoubtedly, K.F ‘Vëllaznimi’ has led in this direction, which has won the title of champion of Kosovo 9 times. The time was difficult but not to stop the reputation of this sport and the love for it among the people of Gjakova.

From the dough that was started by Faik Dushi, new generations emerge, new names such as the case of Hamdi Nuqi, the best red and black goal scorer of all time in Kosovo, or even Avni Zhubi who was one of the main players and strikers of Pristina and helped him to enter the first league of the former Yugoslavia, after passing through Vëllaznimi. The brightest period was when Vllaznim was led by coach Iljaz Sina who was also a player of the club. Under his leadership in 1963-1964 KF Vëllaznimi manages to enter the then joint league of Serbia (namely Kosovo which was the third league of the former Yugoslavia). Also under his leadership Vëllaznimi manages to become champion for four consecutive seasons in this league 1966 -1970 (always sovereign and with a distance of 12-14 points to the second), where they then played in qualifications for the second federal league. The first important trophy was given to the Gjakova Brotherhood by the generation of Bedri Zhubi, the Halilosmani Brothers, Luan Vokshi, Fatmir Zhubi, Fatmir Rraci and many others, when they were adorned with the first title of Champion of Kosovo, which they jealously defended for the next three years. But that remained until 1971, when it qualified for the Second League of the former Yugoslavia. However, many successes of the team are also related to the ardent fans known as the "Red and Blacks of Jakova". Vëllaznimi was the first Kosovar club to wear red and black jerseys for the first time, exactly in 1967.

Zenun Brovina was the first Kosovar to move to a club outside Kosovo. It was this player of Vëllaznimit, who for a while had defended the colors of Partizan Belgrade. Zenun has paved the way for other footballers such as Blerim Mula and Faton Bingazi, who played in several Turkish clubs. However, Ardian Kozniku and Besnik Hasi remained the pride of this city and this club. Both have stepped on the grass of the world's most famous stadiums. While Koznik also has a bronze medal from the 1998 World Cup organized in France, with the Croatia national team, Hasi has several Belgian championship titles and matches in the Champions League, along with the "red and black" national team jersey.

== Honours ==
KF Vëllaznimi honours
Type	Competition	Titles	Seasons/Years
Domestic	Kosovo Province League	9	1967–68, 1968–69, 1969–70, 1970–71, 1973–74, 1979–80, 1981–82, 1985–86, 1989–90
Domestic	Kosovar Cup	1	2007–08
Domestic	Kosovar Province League Cup	3	1984–85, 1986–87, 1987–88

== Historical list of coaches ==
- (Kosovo) Ajet Shosholli (Aug 2013 -Mar 2014)
- (Kosovo) Blerim Mula (Mar 2014 - )
- (Kosovo) Genc Hoxha (Dec 2014 - May 2015)
- (Kosovo) Skënder Shengyli (Mar 2016 - Jul 2016)
- (Kosovo) Haxhi Kurhasku (Jul 2016 - )
- (Kosovo) Ismet Munishi (Jun 2017 - Dec 2017)
- (Kosovo) Arsim Gojani (Jan 2018 - Apr 2018)
- (Kosovo) Gani Sejdiu (1 May 2018 - 24 May 2018)
- (Kosovo) Gani Sejdiu (16 Jun 2018 - Nov 2018)
- (Kosovo) Ismet Munishi (Nov 2018 - Apr 2019)
- (Kosovo) Blerim Mula (Apr 2019 - Jun 2019)
- (Kosovo) Sadat Pajaziti (Jul 2019 - Oct 2019)
- (Kosovo) Haxhi Kurhasku (Oct 2019 - )
- (Albania) Ardian Mema (Oct 2023 - )
