= KF Trepça =

Football club in Kosovo

Trepça
- Full name: Klubi Futbollistik Trepça
- Nickname: Xehetarët (The Miners)
- Founded: 1932; 94 years ago (Note: Both KF Trepça and FK Trepča consider themselves as the official successor of KF Trepça which played in the Yugoslav football system, but officially KF Trepça is considered as the official successor of the club by the Football Federation of Kosovo, while FK Trepča is not considered as the official successor of the club, because it was created in 1989 after the separation of the Football Federation of Kosovo from the Football Association of Yugoslavia.)
- Ground: Adem Jashari Olympic Stadium
- Capacity: 16,300
- Coordinates: 42°53′0″N 20°52′0″E
- Owner: Nexhmedin Haxhiu
- Manager: Shpëtim Babaj
- League: Kosovo First League
- 2024–25: Kosovo First League – Group A, 5th of 10
Home colours	Away colours

Klubi Futbollistik Trepça, commonly known as KF Trepça, is a professional football club based in the southern part of Mitrovica, Kosovo. The club currently plays in the First Football League of Kosovo in Group A. KF Trepça was founded in 1932.

During the Yugoslav era it was the first football club from SAP Kosovo to gain promotion to the First Federal League, Yugoslavia's top football division, in 1977–78, after winning the Second Federal League title in 1976–77. Trepça was one of only two clubs from Kosovo, along with KF Prishtina, who competed in the Yugoslav top level. Trepça also hold the distinction as the only Kosovar club which reached the Yugoslav national cup final, in their first top-level season, losing the 1978 Marshal Tito Cup final to Croatian side Rijeka.

== History ==
=== Early years (1932–1945) ===
Trepça was founded in 1932 by workers of the Trepça Mines in Mitrovica during the period of the Kingdom of Yugoslavia. From the founding year until 1938, the club did not have an own venue, so coached and played on a playing field in the neighboring town Zveçan. In 1938, a small field was built in "Lugu i Çesmës" where they played until the Second World War. Later they received its own stadium, the Trepça Stadium, which offered then about 30,000 spectators. Both Albanians and Serbs played for the club, Albanian players that marked the pre-WWII period were Mazllum Grushti, Hasko Bula, Gota Sezair, Ejup Kerveshi, Adnan Mustafa, Ahmed and Qamil Zajmi, Hysen Murati, Xhati Zhubi, Sali Pllana, Bedri Hamza, Shinasi Rizanolli, Ahmet Shukriu, Burhan Kurkuqi, Jakup Berisha, Qazim Pllana, Sami Konjusha, Agim Deva, Ekrem Neziri, Riza Gashi, etc. Another notable player was Riza Lushta, former Juventus and SSC Napoli player, who spent his youth career at Trepça in 1932–1934.

=== Regional successes (1945–1977) ===
During the Second World War, the Kosovo Albanian players of Trepça, played for the Albanian football club called KF Skënderbeu, which was active during the war and the fascist occupation. After the end of the war, Trepça was long in the shadow of numerous Yugoslav clubs, but achieved regional importance by winning the Kosovo Province League in 1947, 1949, 1950, 1952 and 1955.

=== Successes in Yugoslavian Football (1977–1989) ===
However, in 1977 came the first major success for the club, when they achieved the promotion to the Yugoslav First League. In the following 1977–78 season, the club relegated in the Yugoslav Second League, but managed to achieve the 1977–78 Yugoslav Cup final, where they lost against NK Rijeka by 0–1 after extra time. During this period, the club's nickname Xehetarët (The Miners) was especially popular, and the Trepça players Dragan Mutibarić, Dragan Simeunović and Vladan Radača became members of the Yugoslavia national football team. During the 1960s, 1970s and 1980s the players that emerged in the club were Sali Qubreli, Jakup Abrashi, Ajet Shosholli, Hysni Maxhuni, Luan Prekazi, Rexhep Xhaka, Erdogan Celina, Esat Mehmeti, Ramadan Cimili, Fisnik Ademi, Adnan Zeqiri, Ibrahim Prekazi, Faruk Domi, Aqif Shehu, Mensur Nexhipi, Rafet Prekazi, Genc Hoxha, Avni Juniku, Bakir Burri, Hasan Shasivari, Shemsedin Ajeti, Vahedin Ajeti, Ahmet Turku, Gani Llapashtica, Isa Sadriu, Bardhec Seferi, Sadik Rrahmani, Fahredin Duraku, Nazmi Rama among others. The main supporters of KF Trepça are Torcida Mitrovicë which were formed on 20 March 1984. Over the years Trepça became more and more a monoethnic club, especially in 1987 when under the coach Jashar Peci the absolute majority of the players were Albanians.

=== Kosovo Independent League (1989–1998) ===
On the 25th May 1989, the Albanian players were forced to leave the club even though they formed the majority. As a result, the club divided into two clubs in 1991. Therefore, there were two clubs with the same name, identity and history both claiming the heritage of the successes during the Yugoslavian era and regarding themselves as the successor of Trepça.

In 1991, Kosovo proclaimed independence from Serbia and KF Trepça finally left the Yugoslav football league system like many other clubs did. The Serbian FK Trepča continued to play in the Yugoslav football league system with other phantom clubs like FK Priština, FK Kosovo Polje and Budućnost Peć. KF Trepça became part of Independent League of Kosovo and immediately became one of the dominant football clubs in Kosovo by winning the Kosovar Cup in 1992 and the Independent League of Kosovo in 1993. In 1996 Trepça relegated to the First Football League of Kosovo.

=== Post war (1999–present) ===
Trepça came back to the Football Superleague of Kosovo in 2006 after playing almost one decade in lower tiers. Trepça managed to win the Football Superleague of Kosovo in the 2009-10 season thanks to two goals from the captain Elvis Osmani on the last matchday against Besa Pejë. Nevertheless, Trepça relegated once again after finishing last in 2015. In 2016 they were crowned champions of First Football League of Kosovo and promoted to the Football Superleague of Kosovo. However, they were not able to stay for more than one season in the Superleague after finishing 11th and relegating to the First Football League of Kosovo.

== Supporters ==
Torcida Mitrovicë
- Established: 20 March 1984; 42 years ago
- Type: Supporters' group
- Club: KF Trepça and other sports teams named Trepça
- Headquarters: Mitrovica, Kosovo
- Arena: Adem Jashari Olympic Stadium
- Affiliations: (Albania) Tifozat Kuq e Zi

Trepça's main supporters are Torcida Mitrovicë. They were founded by Shefqet Begu also known as Qeti in 1984. His inspiration came from Torcida Split, the oldest European ultras. Torcida Mitrovicë are considered to be the oldest Albanian ultras. Except of the Trepça clubs, they also support the Albania national team.

=== Rivalries ===
Their biggest rival is FC Prishtina. The rivalry is the most known rivalry in Kosovo due to the history of both clubs. It started in 1945 when Trepça and Prishtina were the dominant clubs in the Kosovo Province League. Both clubs also reached the Yugoslav First League, being the only Kosovan clubs to achieve it, which made the rivalry even more intense. There were several incidents between Torcida and Plisat, Prishtina's supporters club. The incident which made the most headlines was the incident in Elbasan in 2015 where ten fans were arrested and four fans ended up injured. Another rival is KF Trepça'89 who is from the same city. Trepça'89 does not have its own supporter group that is why the derby is less intense.

== Stadium ==
After the Kosovo war in 1999, the city was divided into a southern part with an almost exclusively Kosovo Albanian population and a northern part with a non-Albanian or predominantly Serb population. The 2004 unrest in Kosovo reinforced the ethnic division of the city.

The home ground of the club is now the Adem Jashari Olympic Stadium, the same stadium where the Serbian club FK Trepča played from 1989 until 1999. The stadium is located in the southern part of the city, but FK Trepča is based in North Mitrovica, in North Kosovo; it is not currently possible for them to play their home matches in their former home stadium. Currently, only Albanian teams play in the stadium, including the KF Trepça. The stadium is now called Stadiumi Olimpik Adem Jashari by the Kosovo Albanian population, after Adem Jashari, a former leader of the Albanian paramilitary rebel organisation UÇK. The stadium is the largest in Kosovo with a capacity of 30,000. The stadium is being renovated since 2020. When the renovations are finished the stadium will be a category four stadium.

== Honours ==
- Kosovar Superliga
  - Winners (2): 1992–1993, 2009–10
- Kosovo Province League
  - Winners (5): 1947, 1948–1949, 1949–1950, 1951–52, 1954–55
- Kosovar Cup
  - Winners (1): 1991–1992
- Kosovar Supercup
  - Winners (1): 2009–2010
- Yugoslav Second League
  - Champion: 1976–77 (promoted to Yugoslav First League)
- Yugoslav Cup (1):
  - Runner-up: 1977–78

== Records and statistics ==
=== Players ===
Most appearances

Appearances in competitive matches

Rank	Player	Years	Match
1	(Socialist Federal Republic of Yugoslavia) Rexhep Xhaka	1967–1978	600

== Personnel ==
Current technical staff
Position	Name
Head coach	(Kosovo) Tahir Lushtaku
Assistant coach(es)	(Kosovo) Shpëtim Fetahu
Assistant coach(es)	(Kosovo) Nexhat Zhubi
Goalkeeping coach	(Kosovo) Enis Manxholli
Board members
Office	Name
President	(Kosovo) Nexhmedin Haxhiu
Vice-president	(Kosovo) Avni Haxhiu
General director	(Kosovo) Ajet Shosholli
Sporting director	(Kosovo) Rafet Prekazi

=== List of the managers ===
This is the list of coaches of KF Trepça

1. (Socialist Federal Republic of Yugoslavia) Dragutin Spasojević (1966–67)
2. (Socialist Federal Republic of Yugoslavia) Jakup Abrashi (1975–77)
3. (Socialist Federal Republic of Yugoslavia) Dušan Varagić (1977)
4. (Socialist Federal Republic of Yugoslavia) Ajet Shosholli/Hysni Maxhuni (1977–78)
5. (Socialist Federal Republic of Yugoslavia) Vladica Popović (1978)
6. (Socialist Federal Republic of Yugoslavia) Ajet Shosholli/Hysni Maxhuni (1978–80)
7. (Socialist Federal Republic of Yugoslavia) Jakup Abrashi (1980–81)
8. (Socialist Federal Republic of Yugoslavia) (Turkey) Abdulah Gegić (1981–83)
9. (Socialist Federal Republic of Yugoslavia) Jashar Peci (1987)
10. (Kosovo) Rexhep Xhaka (2000–03)
11. (Kosovo) Nazmi Rama (2006–08)
12. (Kosovo) Gani Sejdiu (2009–10)
13. (Kosovo) Ajet Shosholli (2014–15)
14. (Kosovo) Rafet Prekazi (2015–16)
15. (Kosovo) Fidaim Haxhiu (2019–20)
16. (Kosovo) Emin Baliqi (2020–2025)
17. (Albania) Edi Martini (2025)
18. (Kosovo) Emin Baliqi (2025)
19. (Kosovo) Tahir Lushtaku (2025–present)

=== List of the presidents ===
1. (Socialist Federal Republic of Yugoslavia) Fatmir Agolli (1975–82)
2. (Kosovo) (Kosovo) Nexhmedin Haxhiu (2000–present)

== Players ==
=== Current squad ===
As of 3 September 2023

Note: Flags indicate national team as defined under FIFA eligibility rules; some limited exceptions apply. Players may hold more than one non-FIFA nationality.

No.	Pos.	Nation	Player
1	GK	KOS	Januz Miftari
2	DF	KOS	Sherif Fetahu
3	GK	KOS	Urim Veliu
4	MF	KOS	Arlind Syla
5	DF	BRA	Nicolas Da Silva
6	MF	KOS	Bekim Ferizi
7	FW	KOS	Florent Hyseni
8	DF	KOS	Edmond Turku
9	FW	KOS	Edis Ahmeti
10	MF	KOS	Ardian Neziri
11	MF	KOS	Endrit Emini
12	GK	KOS	Arben Beqiri
13	FW	BRA	Gabriel Coutinho
14	FW	KOS	Dijar Mustafa

No.	Pos.	Nation	Player
15	DF	GHA	Nurudeen Abdulai
16	DF	KOS	Arber Curri
17	DF	KOS	Bleron Istrefi
18	MF	KOS	Edvin Çeshko
19	FW	KOS	Shkelqim Deliu
20	FW	KOS	Ardit Miftari
21	MF	KOS	Liridon Voca
22	DF	KOS	Kushtrim Haxha
23	MF	KOS	Bleron Stublla
24	GK	KOS	Haris Kadriu
29	FW	SEN	Moustapha Ba
30	MF	KOS	Bleron Fetahu
34	MF	RSA	Donald Mokgantle
44	GK	KOS	Ferid Imeri

=== Notable former players ===
This is a list of KF Trepça players with senior national team appearances:

Albania and Kosovo

- Youth
1. (Albania) Afrim Kuçi
2. (Albania) Riza Lushta
- Senior
1. (Albania) (Kosovo) Arbnor Muja
2. (Albania) Rudolf Turkaj
3. (Kosovo) Genc Hoxha
4. (Kosovo) Gani Llapashtica
5. (Kosovo) Ismet Munishi
6. (Kosovo) Ilir Nallbani
7. (Kosovo) Sabit Osmani
8. (Kosovo) Isa Sadriu
9. (Kosovo) Bardhec Seferi
10. (Kosovo) (Socialist Federal Republic of Yugoslavia) Luan Prekazi

Other countries

1. (Finland) Shefki Kuqi
2. (The Gambia) Ismaila Jagne
3. (Saint Kitts and Nevis) Tiquanny Williams
4. (Socialist Federal Republic of Yugoslavia) Dragan Mutibarić
5. (Socialist Federal Republic of Yugoslavia) Vladan Radača

== International matches ==
In 1978, Trepça played two friendlies and participated in the Trofeo Ciudad de Zaragoza.

Season	Competition	Opponent	Result
1978	Preseason game	(United States) New York Eagles	3–3
1978	Trofeo Ciudad de Zaragoza	(Spain) Real Zaragoza	1–3
1978	Trofeo Ciudad de Zaragoza	(Bulgaria) PFC Sliven	1–3
1978	Preseason game	(Albania) Tirana	1–1

== See also ==
- KB Trepça (basketball)
- KH Trepça (handball)
