= Football Superleague of Kosovo =

Men's football league in Kosovo

- Organising body: FFK Competitions Commission
- Founded: 1945; 81 years ago as Kosovo Province League; 1991; 35 years ago as Independent League of Kosovo
- First season: 1945 as Kosovo Province League; 1991–92 as Independent League of Kosovo
- Country: Kosovo
- Confederation: UEFA
- Number of clubs: 10
- Level on pyramid: 1
- Relegation to: Kosovo First League
- Domestic cup(s): Kosovar Cup; Kosovar Supercup
- International cup(s): UEFA Champions League; UEFA Conference League
- Current champions: Drita (5th title) (2025–26)
- Most championships: Prishtina (11 titles)
- Most appearances: Artan Latifi (493)
- Broadcasters: ArtMotion via ArtSport and Klan Kosova
- Website: Official website
- Current: 2026–27 Football Superleague of Kosovo

The Football Superleague of Kosovo (Albanian: Superliga e Futbollit të Kosovës), officially known as the ALBI MALL Superleague of Kosovo (Albanian: ALBI MALL Superliga e Kosovës) for sponsorship reasons, is the top division of the men's football league system in Kosovo. It is organised by the Football Federation of Kosovo (FFK) and, as of the 2024–25 season, is contested by ten clubs playing a 36-match schedule in which each club meets every other side four times. The two lowest-placed teams are relegated to the Kosovo First League, with two clubs promoted in their place.

The competition traces its roots to the Kosovo Province League, founded in 1945 as a regional division within the Yugoslav football pyramid, and to the parallel Independent League of Kosovo, which Kosovar Albanians organised outside state structures between 1991 and the Kosovo War of 1998–99. After 1999 the FFK re-established a unified national championship under the current Superliga name.

Kosovo was admitted to UEFA and FIFA in May 2016, enabling Superleague clubs to enter European competitions. Since then, the Superleague champions have qualified for the preliminary and qualifying rounds of the UEFA Champions League, while other high-placed clubs and the domestic cup winners enter the UEFA Europa Conference League. Prishtina are the most successful club with 11 league titles, while Drita won their fifth championship in 2025–26.

During the 2010s, the Football Superleague of Kosovo gained increased international visibility following Kosovo's admission into UEFA and FIFA in 2016. Participation in UEFA Champions League and UEFA Europa Conference League qualifying rounds provided clubs from Kosovo with greater financial opportunities and international exposure, while also accelerating improvements in stadium infrastructure and licensing standards across the league.

== History ==
=== Early organised football ===
Before World War II, clubs from the territory of present-day Kosovo took part in regional competitions organised by the Belgrade Football Subassociation within the Football Association of Yugoslavia. During the period of Italian and later German occupation, when most of Kosovo was attached to the Albanian Kingdom, local teams were integrated into 1942 Albanian National Championship.

=== Kosovo Province League ===
In 1945, following Kosovo's reintegration into socialist Yugoslavia, the Kosovo Province League (Albanian: Liga e Provincës së Kosovës) was established as a regional division within the Yugoslav football league system. It brought together leading Kosovar clubs that were not competing at federal level, and its champions could progress into the all-Yugoslav tiers. Throughout the socialist period the standard and structure of the league fluctuated, with Kosovar teams occasionally reaching the Yugoslav First or Second Leagues but most clubs remaining at provincial level.

=== Independent League of Kosovo ===
In 1991, amid rising ethnic tensions and the removal of Kosovar Albanians from public institutions, the FFK began organising a parallel, unrecognised competition known as the Independent League of Kosovo (Albanian: Liga e Pavarur e Kosovës). In the summer of that year, after Kosovar clubs were effectively pushed out of the Yugoslav league system, local officials reconstituted the Football Federation of Kosovo as an independent body under president Agim Bytyçi and launched the first separate Republic of Kosova championship. Eight of the ten fixtures in the opening round, played on 13–14 September 1991, went ahead on schedule despite difficult conditions, with the remaining matches completed later.

Matches in the Independent League were often staged on school pitches and improvised village grounds, as Albanian clubs had been denied access to municipal stadiums, and were seen by participants as a way of maintaining sporting life and national identity under conditions of repression. The league operated until the escalation of the Kosovo War in 1998–99, when regular competition became impossible. In 2011 the FFK marked two decades of these parallel structures by publishing the volume Futbolli 1991–2011: 20 vjet mëvetësim, which documents the independent championships and related activities.

=== Post-war Superleague ===
After the end of the conflict, the FFK re-established a unified league structure in 1999, with the top division taking the name Superliga e Kosovës. Serbian clubs from northern municipalities continued to participate in the Serbian football system, while the Superleague became the de facto national championship recognised by the FFK.

In the 2000s and early 2010s, Prishtina, Feronikeli and Drenica were among the leading clubs, with Drita and Gjilani also emerging as title contenders. League champions could not enter UEFA competitions until Kosovo was admitted as a member association in 2016.

Following UEFA and FIFA recognition, Kosovar teams began appearing regularly in European qualifiers. In June 2018, Drita defeated Santa Coloma in the Champions League preliminary round, recording the first victory by a Kosovan club in the competition. In 2022–23, Ballkani became the first Kosovar side to reach the group stage of a UEFA tournament, qualifying for the Europa Conference League group phase.

== Competition format ==
The Superleague currently consists of ten clubs. Each club plays every other side four times—twice at home and twice away—for a total of 36 matches per team and 180 matches in the season. Teams receive three points for a win, one point for a draw and none for a loss. League positions are determined by total points, then goal difference and goals scored.

The bottom two teams in the final table are relegated directly to the Kosovo First League, while the champions and runners-up of that division are promoted to the Superleague. Depending on the competition regulations in a given season, an additional promotion/relegation play-off has sometimes been held between a Superleague club and a high-placed First League team.

== Clubs (2026–27) ==
The leаgue consists of ten teams: the top eight teаms from the previous season, and two teams promoted from the Kosovo First League. Drita enters the season as defending champions.

The promoted teаms are the 2024–25 Kosovo First League winners Vushtrria, who return to the top tier after their last relegation in 2021, and First League runners-up Feronikeli, who only spend one season in the second tier. They replaced the 2025–26 Kosovo Superleague bottom two teams Ferizaj and Prishtina e Re.

Locations of the 2026–27 Football Superleague of Kosovo teams

Note: Table lists in alphabetical order.

Club	Town	Stadium and capacity		UEFA license
Ballkani	Suharekë	Suva Reka City Stadium	1,500	Yes
Drenica	Skenderaj	Bajram Aliu Stadium	3,000	No
Drita	Gjilan	Gjilan Synthetic Grass Stadium (Note: Drita and Gjilani will play their home matches at the Gjilan Synthetic Grass Stadium, instead of their regular stadium Gjilan City Stadium, (Note: Drita and Gjilani use this stadium together and have named the stadium with different names. Drita and their fans named the stadium as Selami Osmani-Bezi Stadium, while Gjilan and their fans named the stadium as Agim Ramadani Stadium, but officially the stadium is named Gjilan City Stadium.) which was under reconstruction.)	1,500	Yes
Dukagjini	Klinë	18 June Stadium	3,000	Yes
Feronikeli	Drenas	Rexhep Rexhepi Stadium	6,500	No
Gjilani	Gjilan	Gjilan Synthetic Grass Stadium	1,500	Yes
Llapi	Podujevë	Zahir Pajaziti Stadium	8,000	Yes
Malisheva	Malishevë	Liman Gegaj Stadium	2,000	Yes
Prishtina	Prishtinë	Fadil Vokrri Stadium	13,000	Yes
Vushtrria	Vushtrri	Various (Note: Vushtrria will play their home matches at various stadiums instead of their regular stadium, Ferki Aliu Stadium, which is currently under reconstruction.)		No

=== Seasons in Superleague ===
There are 37 teams that have taken part in the Football Superleague of Kosovo since 1999. Prishtina is the only team that has played in every season since 1999. As of 2025/26 season; teams in bold are part of current season.

- **26** seasons: **Prishtina**
- **23** seasons: **Drenica**
- **22** seasons: Trepça '89, **Drita**
- **21** seasons: Besa
- **20** seasons: **Gjilani**
- **17** seasons: **Ferizaj**
- **16** seasons: Liria
- **15** seasons: Vëllaznimi, Flamurtari
- **14** seasons: Vushtrria, **Llapi**
- **12** seasons: Feronikeli 74
- **10** seasons: Trepça
- **9** seasons: Besiana, KEK, **Ballkani**
- **8** seasons: Hysi, Kosova VR Prishtinë
- **6** seasons: **Dukagjini**
- **5** seasons: Hajvalia
- **4** seasons: **Malisheva**
- **3** seasons: 2 Korriku, Istogu, Fushë Kosova
- **2** seasons: Shqiponja, Besëlidhja
- **1** season: Lepenci, Ulpiana, Vllaznia Pozheran, Uniteti, Kika, Getoari, Vëllazëria, Rahoveci, Suhareka, **Prishtina e Re**

== Superleague clubs in European competitions ==
Since Kosovo joined UEFA in 2016, the Superleague champions have entered the preliminary and qualifying rounds of the UEFA Champions League, while league runners-up and domestic cup winners qualify for the UEFA Europa Conference League. Clubs must obtain a UEFA licence from the FFK to participate in European competitions.

Drita's preliminary-round win over Santa Coloma in 2018 was the first Champions League victory for a Kosovan side. In 2022 Ballkani reached the Europa Conference League group stage, the first time a team from Kosovo progressed to the main phase of a UEFA club competition, and repeated the achievement in subsequent seasons. Their performances, together with qualifying rounds reached by clubs such as Drita, Prishtina and Feronikeli, have helped improve Kosovo's position in the UEFA association coefficient rankings.

== Champions ==
This is a list of winners of Football Superleague of Kosovo since 1945.

Season	Club	Location
Kosovo Province League (Note: It was one of the leagues forming the fourth level of the Yugoslav football league system. The champion would gain promotion to Yugoslav Inter-Republic League East, one of Yugoslav third tiers.)
1945	Jedinstvo	Pristina
1946	Jedinstvo	Pristina
1947	Trepça	Mitrovica
1947–48	Proleteri	Pristina
1948–49	Trepça	Mitrovica
1950	Trepça	Mitrovica
1951	Kosova	Pristina
1952	Trepça	Mitrovica
1953	Not played due to change of league system	
1953–54	Prishtina	Pristina
1954–55	Trepça	Mitrovica
1955–56	Rudari	Stantërg
1956–57	Rudniku	Hajvalia
1957–58	Rudari	Stantërg
1958–59	Prishtina	Pristina
1959–60	Rudari	Stantërg
1960–61	Prishtina	Pristina
1961–62	Budućnost	Peja
1962–63	Drita	Gjilan
1963–64	Slloga	Lipjan
1964–65	Slloga	Lipjan
1965–66	Budućnost	Peja
1966–67	Obiliq	Obiliq
1967–68	Vëllaznimi	Gjakova
1968–69	Vëllaznimi	Gjakova
1969–70	Vëllaznimi	Gjakova
1970–71	Vëllaznimi	Gjakova
1971–72	Obiliq	Obiliq
1972–73	Fushë Kosova	Kosovo Polje
1973–74	Vëllaznimi	Gjakova
1974–75	Liria	Prizren
1975–76	RHMK Obiliq	Obiliq
1976–77	Prishtina	Pristina
1977–78	Budućnost	Peja
1978–79	Prishtina	Pristina
1979–80	Vëllaznimi	Gjakova
1980–81	Liria	Prizren
1981–82	Vëllaznimi	Gjakova
1982–83	KNI Ramiz Sadiku	Pristina
1983–84	Liria	Prizren
1984–85	Crvena Zvezda	Gjilan
1985–86	Vëllaznimi	Gjakova
1986–87	Liria	Prizren
1987–88	Crvena Zvezda	Gjilan
1988–89	Budućnost	Peja
1989–90	Vëllaznimi	Gjakova
1990–91	Fushë Kosova	Kosovo Polje

Season	Club	Location
Independent League of Kosovo (Note: Unrecognised competition parallel to Serbian league system.)
1991–92	Prishtina	Pristina
1992–93	Trepça	Mitrovica
1993–94	Dukagjini	Klina
1994–95	Liria	Prizren
1995–96	Prishtina	Pristina
1996–97	Prishtina	Pristina
1997–98	Competition not held due to Kosovo War	
1998–99	Competition not held due to Kosovo War	
Football Superleague of Kosovo
1999–2000	Prishtina	Pristina
2000–01	Prishtina	Pristina
2001–02	Besiana	Podujevë
2002–03	Drita	Gjilan
2003–04	Prishtina	Pristina
2004–05	Besa	Peja
2005–06	Besa	Peja
2006–07	Besa	Peja
2007–08	Prishtina	Pristina
2008–09	Prishtina	Pristina
2009–10	Trepça	Mitrovica
2010–11	Hysi	Podujevë
2011–12	Prishtina	Pristina
2012–13	Prishtina	Pristina
2013–14	Vushtrria	Vushtrri
2014–15	Feronikeli	Drenas
2015–16	Feronikeli	Drenas
2016–17	Trepça'89	Mitrovica
2017–18	Drita	Gjilan
2018–19	Feronikeli	Drenas
2019–20	Drita	Gjilan
2020–21	Prishtina	Pristina
2021–22	Ballkani	Suva Reka
2022–23	Ballkani	Suva Reka
2023–24	Ballkani	Suva Reka
2024–25	Drita	Gjilan
2025–26	Drita	

== Most titles ==
The titles won by clubs are shown in the following table:

Club	Titles	Winning years
Prishtina	11	1991–92, 1995–96, 1996–97, 1999–2000, 2000–01, 2003–04, 2007–08, 2008–09, 2011–12, 2012–13, 2020–21
KF Drita	5	2002–03, 2017–18, 2019–20, 2024–25, 2025–26
KF Besa	4	1997–98, 2004–05, 2005–06, 2006–07
Ballkani	3	2021–22, 2022–23, 2023–24
Feronikeli	3	2014–15, 2015–16, 2018–19
Trepça	2	1992–93, 2009–10
Fushë Kosova	1	1990–91
KF Dukagjini	1	1993–94
Liria	1	1994–95
Besiana	1	2001–02
Hysi	1	2010–11
Kosova Vushtrri	1	2013–14

== Top scorers by season ==
Season	Player	Club	Goals
2014–15	(Kosovo) Labinot Osmani	Prishtina	18
2015–16	(Kosovo) Kastriot Rexha	Besa Pejë	12
2016–17	(Nigeria) Otto John	Trepça '89	27
2017–18	(Nigeria) Otto John	Trepça '89	17
2017–18	(Kosovo) Mirlind Daku	Llapi	17
2018–19	(Kosovo) Kastriot Rexha	Feronikeli	21
2019–20	(Kosovo) Blendi Baftiu	Ballkani	19
2020–21	(Kosovo) Mirlind Daku	Ballkani	31
2021–22	(Albania) Gerhard Progni	Gjilani	21
2022–23	(Kosovo) Albion Rrahmani	Ballkani	21
2023–24	(Kosovo) Muhamet Hyseni	Llapi	26
2024–25	(Kosovo) Mevlan Zeka	Suhareka	21
2025–26	(Kosovo) Kreshnik Uka	Drenica	19

== Media and sponsorship ==
From the late 2000s the league has usually carried the name of a title sponsor. The competition’s official designation since 1999 has been Superliga e Futbollit të Kosovës (Football Superleague of Kosovo), but for sponsorship reasons it has been marketed at different times as the:

Name		Period	Notes
Albanian	English	Period	Notes
Raiffeisen Superliga e Kosovës	Raiffeisen Superleague of Kosovo	2008–2016	Sponsored by Raiffeisen Bank Kosovo, a subsidiary of the Raiffeisen Bank International.
Vala Superliga e Kosovës	Vala Superleague of Kosovo	2016–2018	Sponsored by Kosovo Telecom.
IPKO Superliga e Kosovës	IPKO Superleague of Kosovo	2018–2020	Sponsored by IPKO.
BKT Superliga e Kosovës	BKT Superleague of Kosovo	2021–2022	Sponsored by Banka Kombëtare Tregtare.
ALBI MALL Superliga e Kosovës	ALBI MALL Superleague of Kosovo	2022–present	Sponsored by Albi Mall, a subsidiary of the Albi Commerce.

Television rights to the Superleague are held by cable operator ArtMotion via ArtSport and free-to-air channel Klan Kosova under an agreement signed with the FFK in 2023. Matches are broadcast live or in delayed coverage across the two networks, while public broadcaster RTK has shown highlight programmes.
