= List of Kosovan football transfers winter 2020–21 =

This is a list of Kosovan football transfers for the winter sale prior to the 2020–21 season. Only moves from Football Superleague of Kosovo are listed.

== Transfers ==
- All clubs without a flag are Kosovan.
- Flags indicate national team as defined under FIFA eligibility rules. Players may hold more than one non-FIFA nationality.
  Where a player has not declared an international allegiance, nation is determined by place of birth.

=== Arbëria ===
In

No.	Pos.	Nation	Player
14	MF	GER	Andi Seferi (on loan from (Germany) Union Schafhausen)
15	FW	BRA	Marclei (from Feronikeli)
18	MF	ALB	Gresild Lika (on loan from (Albania) Bylis)
19	FW	SRB	Anes Hot (from (North Macedonia) Pelister)
25	MF	MNE	Aldin Adžović (from (Montenegro) Iskra Danilovgrad)
91	DF	ALB	Elmir Lekaj (from (Albania) Vllaznia Shkodër)

Out

No.	Pos.	Nation	Player
4	DF	KOS	Rilind Gërbeshi (to Llapi)
5	DF	KOS	Arbnor Gashi (unattached)
8	MF	KOS	Korab Hasanaj (unattached)
14	MF	KOS	Kujtim Qeli (unattached)
18	MF	KOS	Gzim Rusi (to Dardana)
19	FW	MKD	Sunaj Hasan (to Dardana)
25	FW	MKD	Lutfi Bilalli (to (Slovakia) Partizán Bardejov)
91	MF	KOS	Filonit Shaqiri (unattached)

=== Ballkani ===
In

No.	Pos.	Nation	Player
4	MF	KOS	Diar Miftaraj (from Drenica)
13	DF	KOS	Arbër Shala (from (North Macedonia) Renova)
25	MF	KOS	Albin Kapra (loan return from Trepça '89)
92	GK	MNE	Damir Ljuljanović (from (Montenegro) Dečić)

Out

No.	Pos.	Nation	Player
1	GK	KOS	Armend Ruxhi (to Liria)
4	MF	KOS	Endrit Asllanaj (on loan to Malisheva)
5	DF	KOS	Fatlind Kabashi (on loan to Rahoveci)
14	FW	KOS	Albin Berisha (on loan to Liria Prizren)
16	MF	KOS	Leorant Marmullaku (to Dukagjini)
21	FW	KOS	Liridon Fetahaj (to Liria)
22	FW	MNE	Armin Bošnjak (to (Singapore) Tampines Rovers)
24	FW	KOS	Bleon Sekiraqa (on loan to Malisheva)
25	MF	KOS	Albin Kapra (on loan to Trepça '89)
27	MF	KOS	Durim Gashi (to A&N)
77	DF	MKD	Melos Bajrami (to (Albania) Skënderbeu Korçë)
92	GK	KOS	Flamur Gashi (to Malisheva)
88	MF	KOS	Roni Gashi (to Liria)

=== Besa Pejë ===
In

No.	Pos.	Nation	Player
2	DF	ENG	Guri Hana (from (Germany) Lüneburger SK Hansa)
7	MF	KOS	Erjon Morina (from (Switzerland) Kickers Luzern)
8	MF	ALB	Diellor Beseni (from Dukagjini)
11	FW	KOS	Bekim Maliqi (from Llapi)
13	MF	MTN	Ethmane M'Heimar (from (Mauritania) Académie FFRIM)
19	MF	KOS	Ardi Qorri (on loan from Feronikeli)
27	DF	MTN	Bilal Taghiyoullah (from (Mauritania) Académie FFRIM)
33	FW	KOS	Dhurim Zhuri (on loan from Prishtina)
36	FW	MTN	Ahmed Salem M'bareck (from (Mauritania) Académie FFRIM)

Out

No.	Pos.	Nation	Player
3	DF	MNE	Filip Šćekić (to (Montenegro) Jedinstvo Bijelo Polje)
4	DF	KOS	Andi Alshiqi (on loan to Ramiz Sadiku)
5	MF	KOS	Fisnik Papuçi (retired)
6	FW	BRA	Breno Barbosa Matos (unattached)
7	MF	KOS	Florent Qorraj (to Vëllaznimi)
8	MF	BRA	Lucas Sebastian (to (Brazil) Próspera)
9	FW	BRA	Matheus de Paula (unattached)
11	FW	KOS	Norik Krasniqi (unattached)
37	MF	KOS	Arbër Maznikolli (on loan to Onix Banjë)

=== Drenica ===
In

No.	Pos.	Nation	Player
5	DF	ALB	Eglentin Gjoni (from Llapi)
6	MF	ALB	Behar Ramadani (from (Albania) Vllaznia Shkodër)
18	MF	BRA	Denisson Silva (from (Portugal) Braga B)
19	DF	ALB	Erlis Frashëri (from Gjilani)
20	FW	KOS	Dardan Rogova (from Vëllaznimi)
21	DF	ALB	Donald Rapo (from (Albania) Laçi)
22	MF	ALB	Klevis Shaqe (from (Albania) Turbina)
25	FW	GRE	Dionis Çikani (on loan from (Albania) Partizani Tirana)
28	MF	KOS	Kreshnik Uka (on loan from Prishtina)
29	DF	ALB	Harallamb Qaqi (from (Albania) Skënderbeu Korçë)
90	MF	KOS	Kreshnik Lushtaku (from (Germany) Türkspor Neckarsulm)

Out

No.	Pos.	Nation	Player
4	MF	KOS	Jeton Dushi (to Dukagjini)
5	DF	ALB	Valdo Zeqaj (to A&N)
6	MF	KOS	Arbios Thaçi (to Malisheva)
18	MF	KOS	Flamur Kadriu (unattached)
19	MF	KOS	Lulzim Doshlaku (to KEK)
20	MF	KOS	Diar Miftaraj (to Ballkani)
21	MF	ALB	Almedin Murati (to Dardana)
22	DF	KOS	Muharrem Musa (unattached)
28	FW	MKD	Vildan Kerim (to Dukagjini)
45	MF	KOS	Ehat Gjoka (unattached)
88	MF	KOS	Albutrint Morina (to A&N)
93	GK	ALB	Mikel Kaloshi (to (Albania) Tomori)

=== Drita ===
In

No.	Pos.	Nation	Player
11	MF	NGA	Esosa Priestley Irogue (from (Northern Cyprus) Lefke)
14	DF	NGA	Henry Austine Onoka (returned from career break)

Out

No.	Pos.	Nation	Player
21	MF	KOS	Valmir Azemi (on loan to Vushtrria)

=== Feronikeli ===
In

No.	Pos.	Nation	Player
2	DF	NED	Simon Loshi (from (Poland) Resovia)
3	DF	KOS	Drinor Morina (promoted from youth team)
9	FW	KOS	Sokol Kiqina (promoted from youth team)
17	MF	MNE	Damir Kojašević (from (Montenegro) Sutjeska Nikšić)

Out

No.	Pos.	Nation	Player
9	FW	BRA	Marclei (to Arbëria)
17	MF	ALB	Bedri Greca (unattached)
27	MF	KOS	Argjend Bardhi (unattached)
29	MF	KOS	Ardi Qorri (on loan to Besa Pejë)
62	DF	KOS	Viktor Kuka (to Malisheva)
66	DF	KOS	Alban Pnishi (to (Switzerland) Wohlen)
77	DF	SVN	Ožbej Kuhar (to (Slovenia) Fužinar)

=== Gjilani ===
In

No.	Pos.	Nation	Player
10	MF	KOS	Qëndrim Dautaj (from Vëllaznimi)
13	DF	KOS	Ardin Dallku (returned from career break)
14	DF	KOS	Drin Govori (from (Albania) Skënderbeu Korçë)
30	GK	KOS	Petrit Terziu (from Vitia, previously on loan)

Out

No.	Pos.	Nation	Player
6	DF	BRA	Jackson (to (Albania) Teuta Durrës)
13	MF	KOS	Gramoz Kurtaj (to (Vietnam) Nam Dinh)
19	DF	ALB	Erlis Frashëri (to Drenica)
25	MF	KOS	Lavdrit Mehmeti (on loan to Ulpiana)
26	FW	KOS	Muhamet Dubova (on loan to Vitia)
43	DF	KOS	Albin Halimi (on loan to Vitia)

=== Llapi ===
In

No.	Pos.	Nation	Player
1	GK	CRO	Marijan Ćorić (unattached)
2	DF	KOS	Granit Musa (promoted from youth team)
3	DF	LBN	Amir Hossari (from (Lebanon) Shabab El Bourj)
6	DF	FRA	Anthony Monin (from (Switzerland) Vallorbe-Ballaigues)
11	DF	KOS	Rilind Gërbeshi (from Arbëria)
14	MF	KOS	Enis Stublla (from Onix Banjë)
16	MF	KOS	Ilir Krasniqi (from KEK)
28	MF	KOS	Almedin Klinaku (from KEK)
64	GK	ENG	Drilon Ajeti (unattached)
97	MF	GER	Labinot Jashanica (loan return from Malisheva)
—	FW	KOS	Venhar Hyseni (from Ramiz Sadiku)

Out

No.	Pos.	Nation	Player
11	DF	KOS	Rilind Gërbeshi (on loan to Ulpiana)
16	DF	ALB	Eglentin Gjoni (to Drenica)
24	FW	KOS	Bekim Maliqi (to Besa Pejë)
36	GK	RSA	Steven Hoffman (unattached)
66	GK	ALB	Arlis Shala (to (Albania) Kastrioti)
97	MF	GER	Labinot Jashanica (to Dukagjini)
99	FW	MKD	Premtim Jakupi (on loan to (North Macedonia) Gostivari)

=== Prishtina ===
In

No.	Pos.	Nation	Player
12	GK	KOS	Ardit Nika (from Flamurtari)

Out

No.	Pos.	Nation	Player
6	MF	KOS	Donat Hasanaj (to Dukagjini)
9	FW	KOS	Dhurim Zhuri (on loan to Besa Pejë)
11	MF	KOS	Kreshnik Uka (on loan to Drenica)
12	GK	CRO	Ivan Jelić (to (Croatia) Split)
23	FW	KOS	Nikson Memaj (to Trepça '89)
34	DF	TUN	Ahmed Raddaoui (to (Tunisia) Tataouine)

=== Trepça '89 ===
In

No.	Pos.	Nation	Player
4	FW	KOS	Nikson Memaj (from Prishtina)
5	DF	BRA	Gustavo Carbonieri (from (Bulgaria) Tsarsko Selo)
18	FW	RSA	Ranga Chivaviro (unattached)
24	MF	RSA	Mphakamiseni Nene (from (South Africa) TS Sporting)
31	GK	MKD	Darko Tofiloski (unattached)
—	DF	GHA	Augustine Ameworlorna (from (Turkey) JK Football Academy)
—	MF	KOS	Albin Kapra (on loan from Ballkani)
—	MF	GHA	Daniel Tette (unattached)
—	MF	GHA	Nuhu Umar (unattached)
—	FW	GUI	Moriba Tokpa Lamah (from (Turkey) Denizlispor U19)
—	UNK	RSA	Mvuleni Madikane Logan Mnisi (unattached)
—	UNK	RSA	Njabulo Dube (unattached)

Out

No.	Pos.	Nation	Player
1	GK	KOS	Arben Beqiri (to Vushtrria)
4	MF	SRB	Ervin Kačar (unattached)
6	DF	KOS	Albert Kaçiku (unattached)
8	MF	ALB	Berat Ahmeti (to Ulpiana)
17	MF	KOS	Kreshnik Nebihu (to (Albania) Bylis)
28	MF	KOS	Milot Avdyli (to (Switzerland) Aarau)
45	FW	MLI	Djibril Diawara (to (Sweden) Österlen)
99	FW	GHA	Bismark Charles (to (Bulgaria) CSKA Sofia)
—	MF	KOS	Albin Kapra (loan return to Ballkani)
