= List of Kosovan football transfers summer 2021 =

This is a list of Kosovan football transfers for the summer sale prior to the 2021–22 season. Only moves from Football Superleague of Kosovo are listed.

== Transfers ==
- All clubs without a flag are Kosovan.
- Flags indicate national team as defined under FIFA eligibility rules. Players may hold more than one non-FIFA nationality.
  Where a player has not declared an international allegiance, nation is determined by place of birth.

=== Ballkani ===
In

No.	Pos.	Nation	Player
4	DF	KOS	Astrit Thaqi (from Feronikeli)
9	FW	KOS	Albion Rrahmani (from Malisheva)
19	DF	ALB	Rustem Hoxha (from (Albania) Teuta Durrës)
30	MF	KOS	Argjend Malaj (from Feronikeli)
45	FW	NGA	Theophilus Solomon (from (Croatia) Istra 1961)
61	MF	ALB	Arens Mateli (from (Turkey) Akhisarspor)
77	GK	ALB	Stivi Frashëri (from (Albania) Teuta Durrës)
98	MF	KOS	Malsor Ajeti (from Flamurtari)

Out

No.	Pos.	Nation	Player
4	MF	KOS	Diar Miftaraj (to (Switzerland) FC Linth 04)
9	FW	KOS	Arbër Hoxha (to (Croatia) Lokomotiva)
13	DF	KOS	Arbër Shala (to Dukagjini)
19	FW	KOS	Mirlind Daku (loan return to (Croatia) Osijek II)
30	GK	KOS	Kenan Haxhihamza (to Dukagjini)
33	DF	KOS	Arbër Prekazi (to Gjilani)

=== Drenica ===
In

No.	Pos.	Nation	Player
1	GK	KOS	Visar Haxhijaj (from Besa Pejë)
3	MF	BRA	Bruno Arrabal (from Arbëria)
6	MF	KOS	Arbios Thaçi (from Malisheva)
14	FW	KOS	Erjon Morina (from Besa Pejë)
15	MF	KOS	Armend Abazi (from Malisheva)
18	MF	KOS	Fatlum Gashi (from Dukagjini)
21	DF	KOS	Qlirim Avdulli (from Llapi)
25	DF	KOS	Erdin Dushi (from Prishtina)
61	GK	ALB	Mikel Kaloshi (from (Albania) Tomori)
99	FW	NOR	Samuel Narh (from (Portugal) Länk FCV)

Out

No.	Pos.	Nation	Player
1	GK	KOS	Arion Ymeri (to Gjilani)
4	MF	KOS	Argjent Mustafa (to Ulpiana)
5	DF	ALB	Eglentin Gjoni (to Ulpiana)
6	MF	ALB	Behar Ramadani (to (Albania) Flamurtari)
10	MF	KOS	Qemajl Elshani (to Feronikeli)
14	DF	KOS	Gentrit Dumani (to Malisheva)
16	DF	KOS	Azem Bejta (to Malisheva)
19	DF	ALB	Erlis Frashëri (released)
20	FW	KOS	Dardan Rogova (to Vëllaznimi)
21	DF	ALB	Donald Rapo (to (Albania) Kukësi)
22	MF	ALB	Klevis Shaqe (released)
27	MF	KOS	Gentrit Ulluri (to Malisheva)
93	GK	KOS	Altin Gjokaj (to Besa Pejë)

=== Drita ===
In

No.	Pos.	Nation	Player
4	MF	KOS	Rron Broja (from (Albania) Partizani Tirana)
8	MF	KOS	Arbnor Muja (from (Albania) Skënderbeu Korçë)
9	FW	ALB	Agim Zeka (from Austria Wien)
10	MF	KOS	Muharrem Jashari (from Trepça '89)
19	FW	KOS	Ardit Tahiri (from Besa Pejë)
23	DF	KOS	Përparim Islami (from Feronikeli)
26	DF	LBR	Prince Balde (from Feronikeli)
44	DF	KOS	Tun Bardhoku (from Prishtina)
70	FW	MKD	Marko Simonovski (from Feronikeli)
98	MF	KOS	Almir Kryeziu (from Arbëria)

Out

No.	Pos.	Nation	Player
2	DF	KOS	Enhar Cakolli (on loan to Ferizaj)
3	DF	GHA	Arago Jamal (to (Azerbaijan) Sabail)
4	DF	KOS	Fidan Gërbeshi (to Arbëria)
8	MF	KOS	Ergyn Ahmeti (to Dukagjini)
10	FW	KOS	Xhevdet Shabani (to Prishtina)
14	DF	NGA	Henry Austine Onoka (on loan to Arbëria)
19	MF	KOS	Olti Mehmeti (to Prishtina)
24	FW	KOS	Kastriot Rexha (released)
25	MF	KOS	Bujar Shabani (to (North Macedonia) Shkupi)
77	DF	MKD	Vladica Brdarovski (to (North Macedonia) Shkupi)
97	FW	KOS	Festim Alidema (loan return to (Croatia) Slaven Belupo)

=== Dukagjini ===
In

No.	Pos.	Nation	Player
3	DF	KOS	Arbër Shala (from Ballkani)
14	MF	CRO	Jozef Kuqi (from (Croatia) Opatija)
18	MF	KOS	Ergyn Ahmeti (from Drita)
22	MF	KOS	Argjend Bardhi (unattached)
23	DF	KOS	Ermal Vitija (from Prishtina)
25	GK	KOS	Kenan Haxhihamza (from Ballkani)
27	FW	ALB	Ahmed Januzi (from Llapi)
30	MF	BRA	Jean Carioca (from Feronikeli)
44	DF	KOS	Ardin Dallku (from Gjilani)
88	FW	NGA	Odi Chibueze (from Vëllaznimi)
90	MF	KOS	Bujar Shabani (from (North Macedonia) Shkupi)
—	FW	GUI	Moriba Tokpa Lamah (from Trepça '89)

Out

No.	Pos.	Nation	Player
9	FW	MKD	Vildan Kerim (to (North Macedonia) Vardar)
14	FW	LBR	Abu Kamara (to (North Macedonia) Makedonija GP)
23	FW	KOS	Labinot Osmani (to Vushtrria)
—	MF	KOS	Fatlum Gashi (to Drenica)

=== Feronikeli ===
In

No.	Pos.	Nation	Player
8	MF	KOS	Alban Shabani (from (Albania) Skënderbeu Korçë)
10	MF	KOS	Qemajl Elshani (from Drenica)
14	MF	KOS	Drilon Leku (from Drenasi)
16	DF	KOS	Azem Bejta (from Malisheva)
18	MF	ALB	Berat Ahmeti (from Ulpiana)
20	MF	KOS	Behar Maliqi (from Prishtina)
26	FW	KOS	Diar Prokshi (from Drenasi)
27	FW	KOS	Dren Gashi (from (Albania) Egnatia)
61	DF	KOS	Endrit Kastrati (from Drenasi)

Out

No.	Pos.	Nation	Player
4	MF	KOS	Albert Dabiqaj (to Gjilani)
6	DF	KOS	Astrit Thaqi (to Ballkani)
7	FW	KOS	Mendurim Hoti (to Prishtina)
8	MF	KOS	Argjend Malaj (to Ballkani)
10	MF	MKD	Besmir Bojku (loan return to (North Macedonia) Shkëndija)
11	MF	BRA	Jean Carioca (to Dukagjini)
14	FW	KOS	Adem Maliqi (to Llapi)
17	MF	MNE	Damir Kojašević (to (Montenegro) Dečić)
21	DF	KOS	Përparim Islami (to Drita)
33	MF	MNE	Marko Milićković (to (Montenegro) Petrovac)
61	DF	LBR	Prince Balde (to Drita)
70	FW	MKD	Marko Simonovski (to Drita)
90	GK	KOS	Ilir Avdyli (to Llapi)
99	DF	KOS	Yll Hoxha (to Gjilani)

=== Gjilani ===
In

No.	Pos.	Nation	Player
6	MF	ALB	Fabian Beqja (from (Albania) Teuta Durrës)
7	FW	BRA	Elton Calé (from (Albania) Tirana)
8	MF	KOS	Qëndrim Ismajli (loan return from Dardana)
10	FW	ARG	Agustín Torassa (from (Albania) Tirana)
12	GK	KOS	Petrit Terziu (loan return from Vitia)
14	MF	KOS	Albert Dabiqaj (from Feronikeli)
19	FW	ALB	Blerim Krasniqi (from (Albania) Teuta Durrës)
26	FW	KOS	Muhamed Dubova (loan return from Vitia)
28	MF	KOS	Ukshin Hoti (from Liria Prizren)
33	DF	KOS	Arbër Prekazi (from Ballkani)
43	DF	KOS	Albin Halimi (loan return from Vitia)
88	MF	KOS	Donjet Shkodra (from (Kazakhstan) Atyrau)
95	GK	KOS	Arion Ymeri (from Drenica)
99	DF	KOS	Yll Hoxha (from Feronikeli)

Out

No.	Pos.	Nation	Player
7	MF	ALB	Arbër Çyrbja (to (Albania) Egnatia)
8	MF	ALB	Ardit Hila (to (Albania) Kukësi)
9	FW	CRO	Tomislav Bušić (retired)
10	MF	KOS	Qëndrim Dautaj (released)
12	GK	ALB	Shkëlzen Ruçi (to (Albania) Skënderbeu Korçë)
13	DF	KOS	Drin Govori (released)
14	DF	KOS	Ardin Dallku (to Dukagjini)
21	FW	MNE	Darko Nikač (released)
30	GK	KOS	Petrit Terziu (on loan to Vëllaznimi)
55	DF	CRO	Ivan Fuštar (released)

=== Llapi ===
In

No.	Pos.	Nation	Player
6	DF	KOS	Dardan Jashari (from Ferizaj)
14	FW	KOS	Adem Maliqi (from Feronikeli)
15	DF	ALB	Hajdin Salihu (loan return from (Croatia) Lokomotiva)
17	FW	KOS	Alban Shillova (from Prishtina)
21	MF	KOS	Dren Ahmeti (from Vushtrria)
22	DF	KOS	Qlirim Avdulli (from Arbëria)
22	MF	KOS	Festim Haxhiu (from Besa Pejë)
27	MF	KOS	Ardi Shala (from Ulpiana)
31	MF	MEX	Francisco Rivera (from (Mexico) Mineros de Zacatecas)
33	DF	BRA	Bianor Neto (from (North Macedonia) Shkupi)
90	GK	KOS	Ilir Avdyli (from Feronikeli)
97	FW	KOS	Festim Alidema (from (Croatia) Slaven Belupo)
98	FW	BRA	Alef Firmino (from (Croatia) Dubrava)
99	FW	KOS	Drilon Fazliu (from Vushtrria)
—	MF	MKD	Ardit Demiri (from (North Macedonia) Drita Bogovinë)
—	MF	ENG	Dion Miftari (returned from career break)
—	FW	ALB	Jurgen Peqini (from (Albania) Besa Kavajë)

Out

No.	Pos.	Nation	Player
2	DF	KOS	Granit Musa (released)
11	FW	KOS	Muhamet Hyseni (to Malisheva)
13	DF	KOS	Liridon Leci (released)
14	MF	KOS	Enis Stublla (to Rahoveci)
15	DF	ALB	Hajdin Salihu (to (Croatia) Lokomotiva)
21	MF	SUI	Alban Ramadani (released)
22	DF	KOS	Qlirim Avdulli (to Drenica)
27	FW	ALB	Ahmed Januzi (to Dukagjini)
27	MF	KOS	Ardi Shala (on loan to Ulpiana)
29	FW	MNE	Sava Gardašević (released)
37	MF	KOS	Engjëll Hoti (to (Albania) Tirana)
64	GK	KOS	Drilon Ajeti (on loan to Ulpiana)
88	DF	KOS	Ahmet Haliti (released)
—	MF	MKD	Ardit Demiri (to (North Macedonia) Voska Sport)
—	MF	ENG	Dion Miftari (on loan to A&N)
—	FW	ALB	Jurgen Peqini (to (Albania) Erzeni)

=== Malisheva ===
In

No.	Pos.	Nation	Player
6	MF	KOS	Gentrit Ulluri (from Drenica)
8	DF	KOS	Gentrit Dumani (from Drenica)
9	FW	KOS	Torvioll Stullqaku (from Flamurtari)
10	MF	KOS	Agron Bruqi (from Arbëria)
11	FW	KOS	Muhamet Hyseni (from Llapi)
16	DF	KOS	Azem Bejta (from Drenica)
17	MF	GER	Edison Mazreku (unattached)
19	FW	ENG	Yoan Marc-Olivier (from Istogu)
20	DF	KOS	Arbër Pira (from Arbëria)
21	MF	KOS	Gentian Binishi (from Vllaznia Pozheran)
22	FW	ENG	Ronald Sobowale (from (England) Whitehawk)
24	MF	KOS	Ilir Mustafa (from (Turkey) Ankara Keçiörengücü)
27	MF	KOS	Hasan Hyseni (from A&N)
34	DF	ALB	Agon Xhaka (from Prishtina)
77	MF	KOS	Mërgim Pefqeli (from Prishtina)
—	DF	KOS	Abit Salihu (from 2 Korriku)
—	FW	KOS	Fatlum Lleshi (from (Albania) Burreli)

Out

No.	Pos.	Nation	Player
8	UNK	KOS	Shqipdon Morina (released)
9	FW	KOS	Albion Rrahmani (to Ballkani)
10	UNK	KOS	Edonis Krasniqi (released)
15	MF	KOS	Armend Abazi (to Drenica)
16	DF	KOS	Azem Bejta (to Feronikeli)
24	FW	KOS	Gentrit Bislimi (to Onix Banjë)
25	MF	KOS	Arbios Thaçi (to Drenica)

=== Prishtina ===
In

No.	Pos.	Nation	Player
1	GK	KOS	Betim Halimi (from (Ukraine) Olimpik Donetsk)
5	DF	NGA	Sodiq Atanda (from (Israel) Hapoel Kfar Saba)
6	MF	KOS	Arlind Shabani (from (North Macedonia) Struga)
8	FW	KOS	Xhevdet Shabani (from Drita)
9	FW	KOS	Leotrim Kryeziu (from (Switzerland) Lugano)
11	FW	KOS	Mendurim Hoti (from Feronikeli)
13	MF	ALB	Erando Karabeci (from (Albania) Teuta Durrës)
15	DF	KOS	Benet Ismaili (from Rroni 19)
17	MF	KOS	Gentris Leci (promoted from youth team)
21	FW	KOS	Bleart Tolaj (from (Croatia) Hajduk Split II)
22	MF	KOS	Olti Mehmeti (from Drita)
23	GK	KOS	Laurit Behluli (loan return from Kika)
27	FW	KOS	Ernis Topalli (promoted from youth team)
32	DF	ALB	Kristi Vangjeli (from (Albania) Tirana)
33	FW	KOS	Besart Berisha (from (Australia) Western United)
80	MF	KOS	Florent Avdyli (from (Albania) Teuta Durrës)

Out

No.	Pos.	Nation	Player
1	GK	KOS	Alban Muqiqi (released)
4	DF	KOS	Tun Bardhoku (to Drita)
5	DF	KOS	Lumbardh Dellova (loan return to (Croatia) Hajduk Split)
6	DF	KOS	Erdin Dushi (to Drenica)
8	MF	KOS	Mërgim Pefqeli (to Malisheva)
9	FW	KOS	Leotrim Kryeziu (loan return to (Switzerland) Lugano)
17	FW	KOS	Alban Shillova (to Llapi)
21	MF	ALB	Enis Gavazaj (to (Albania) Dinamo Tirana)
21	DF	KOS	Ermal Vitija (to Dukagjini)
22	DF	ALB	Gentian Muça (to (Albania) Tirana)
23	GK	KOS	Laurit Behluli (to Kika)
24	MF	KOS	Behar Maliqi (to Feronikeli)
27	FW	KOS	Albin Prapashtica (on loan to Vëllaznimi)
34	DF	ALB	Agon Xhaka (to Malisheva)

=== Ulpiana ===
In

No.	Pos.	Nation	Player
9	FW	BRA	Marclei (from Arbëria)
10	MF	BRA	Iran Junior (from (Albania) Teuta Durrës)
14	MF	KOS	Argjent Mustafa (from Drenica)
15	DF	KOS	Leuart Avdyli (from Trepça '89)
16	DF	ALB	Eglentin Gjoni (from Drenica)
17	MF	KOS	Ardi Shala (on loan from Llapi)
19	MF	CMR	Fabrice Boudega (from Istogu)
20	DF	KOS	Denis Haliti (from Flamurtari)
23	FW	ALB	Ermir Rezi (from (Albania) Kastrioti)
31	GK	ALB	Jetmir Basha (from (Albania) Kukësi)
33	DF	ALB	Silvester Shkalla (from (Albania) Kastrioti)
64	GK	ENG	Drilon Ajeti (on loan from Llapi)

Out

No.	Pos.	Nation	Player
6	DF	KOS	Rilind Gërbeshi (to Arbëria)
8	MF	KOS	Endrit Ademi (to Arbëria)
13	MF	KOS	Kujtim Qeli (to Vjosa)
14	MF	ALB	Berat Ahmeti (to Feronikeli)
17	MF	KOS	Ardi Shala (to Llapi)
20	DF	KOS	Denis Haliti (released)
