= 2019–20 Kosovar Cup =

Tournament details
- Country: Kosovo
- Teams: 106

Final positions
- Champions: Prishtina
- Runners-up: Ballkani

Tournament statistics
- Matches played: 32
- Goals scored: 111 (3.47 per match)

The 2019–20 Kosovar Cup is the football knockout competition of Kosovo in the 2019–20 season.

== Second round ==
The draw for the second round was held on 18 November 2019.

Results:

No	Date	Matches
1	28.11.2019	2 Korriku 1–0 Istogu
2	28.11.2019	Dukagjini 2–1 Besa Pejë
3	28.11.2019	Vëllaznimi 2–4 Ferizaj
4	28.11.2019	Vitia 5–1 Ramiz Sadiku
5	28.11.2019	Ulpiana 1–3 Liria
6	28.11.2019	KF Malisheva 0–3 Gjilani
7	28.11.2019	Feronikeli 1–0 Llapi
8	28.11.2019	Dardana 4–3 (a.e.t.) Vllaznia
9	28.11.2019	Ballkani 1–1 (a.e.t.) (5–4 p) Drita
10	28.11.2019	Dardanët 0–5 Trepça '89
11	28.11.2019	Flamurtari 1–3 Vushtrria
12	28.11.2019	Minatori 0–4 Prishtina
13	28.11.2019	Drenica 3–1 Fushë Kosova
14	28.11.2019	Trepça 2–1 (a.e.t.) Drenasi
15	28.11.2019	A&N 4–1 KEK
16	28.11.2019	Arbëria 1–0 Onix

== Third round ==
The draw for the third round was held on 3 December 2019.

Results:

No	Date	Matches
1	07.12.2019	Ballkani 3–0 Trepça '89
2	07.12.2019	Drenica 5–0 Dardana
3	07.12.2019	Feronikeli 4–0 A&N
4	07.12.2019	Vitia 1–2 Dukagjini
5	08.12.2019	Arbëria 0–1 Prishtina
6	08.12.2019	Trepça 2–4 Vushtrria
7	08.12.2019	Liria 1–0 Ferizaj
8	08.12.2019	Gjilani 6–1 2 Korriku

== Quarter-finals ==
The draw for the fourth round was held on 12 December 2019.

Results:

No	Date	Matches
1	08.02.2020	Drenica 2–1 (a.e.t.) Gjilani
2	08.02.2020	Prishtina 4–1 Vushtrria
3	09.02.2020	Dukagjini 0–2 Ballkani
4	12.02.2020	Liria 0–2 Feronikeli

== Semifinals ==
The draw for the fifth round was held on 18 February 2020. Due to COVID-19 pandemic, the semifinal matches were rescheduled for 2 and 3 June, and the return matches were played on 17 June.

=== First leg ===
2 June 2020	FC Prishtina	3–0	KF Drenica	Pristina
18:00 (UTC+2)	Januzi 29', 44'; Korenica 90'			Stadium: Fadil Vokrri Stadium; Attendance: 0

3 June 2020	FC Ballkani	0–0	KF Feronikeli	Suva Reka
16:00 (UTC+2)				Stadium: Suva Reka City Stadium; Attendance: 0

=== Second leg ===
17 June 2020	KF Drenica	2–3 (2–6 agg.)	FC Prishtina	Skenderaj
	Muleci 66', 85'		Abazi 26'; Krasniqi 32' (pen.); Bekteshi 56' (pen.)	Stadium: Bajram Aliu Stadium; Attendance: 0 Referee: Genc Nuza

17 June 2020	KF Feronikeli	1–1 (1–1(a) agg.)	FC Ballkani	Glogovac
	Harmon 65'		Daku 27'	Stadium: Rexhep Rexhepi Stadium; Attendance: 0 Referee: Visar Kastrati

== Final ==
Prishtina and the Ballkani will play in the final of the Digital Cup of Kosovo, which is scheduled for 29 July.

29 July 2020
17:45

FC Prishtina	1–0	FC Ballkani
John 20'	Report

Fadil Vokrri Stadium, Pristina
Attendance: 0
Referee: Genc Nuza
