= 2020–21 First Football League of Kosovo =

First Football League of Kosovo
- Season: 2020–21
- Dates: 19 September 2020 – 15 May 2021
- Matches: 201
- Goals: 432 (2.15 per match)
- Biggest home win: Liria 7–1 Vushtrria (20 March 2021)
- Highest scoring: Liria 7–1 Vushtrria (20 March 2021)
- Lowest attendance: 0
- All statistics correct as of 2 April 2021.

The 2020–21 First Football League of Kosovo season was the 22nd edition of second-tier football in Kosovo. The season began on 18 September 2020 and ended in May or June 2021. A total of 20 teams contested in the league: 18 teams from the 2019–20 season and two teams from the 2019–20 Third Football League of Kosovo.

== Teams ==
20 teams contested in the league – the 18 teams were from the previous season and the two teams promoted from the 2019–20 Third Football League of Kosovo. The promoted teams are Kika and A&N.

=== Stadiums and locations ===
Locations of the 2020–21 First Football League of Kosovo teams: Group A; Group B

Note: Table lists in alphabetical order.

Club	Town	Stadium and capacity	
Group A
A&N	Prizren	Boka-Boka Studium, Koriša	1,500
Drenasi	Glogovac	Glogovac Synthetic Grass Stadium	1,500
Dukagjini	Klina	18 June Stadium	1,000
Istogu	Istok	Demush Mavraj Stadium	6,000
Liria	Prizren	Përparim Thaçi Stadium	15,000
Malisheva	Mališevo	Liman Gegaj Stadium	1,800
Onix Banjë	Banja of Peja	Onix Banjë Stadium	1,500
Trepça	Mitrovica	Adem Jashari Olympic Stadium	18,500
Vëllaznimi	Gjakova	Gjakova City Stadium	6,000
Vushtrria	Vushtrri	Ferki Aliu Stadium	6,000
Group B
2 Korriku	Pristina	2 Korriku Sports Field	1,000
Dardana	Kamenica	Agush Isufi Stadium	1,000
Ferizaj	Ferizaj	Ferizaj Synthetic Grass Stadium	1,500
Flamurtari	Pristina	Xhemail Ibishi Stadium	5,000
KEK	Obilić	Agron Rama Stadium	5,000
Kika	Kamenica	Kika Stadium	1,500
Ramiz Sadiku	Pristina	Ramiz Sadiku Stadium	5,000
Ulpiana	Lipljan	Sami Kelmendi Stadium	2,500
Vitia	Vitina	Vitia City Stadium	3,000
Vllaznia Pozheran	Požaranje	Ibrahim Kurteshi Stadium	3,000

== League table ==
=== Group A ===
Pos	Team	Pld	W	D	L	GF	GA	GD	Pts	Promotion, qualification or relegation
1	Malisheva (P)	27	19	3	5	56	20	+36	60	Promotion to 2021–22 Football Superleague of Kosovo
2	Dukagjini (P, O)	27	17	7	3	52	24	+28	58	Qualification to promotion play-offs
3	Istogu	27	13	8	6	34	18	+16	47	
4	A&N	27	11	4	12	41	36	+5	37	
5	Liria	27	8	10	9	34	25	+9	34	
6	Trepça	27	9	6	12	36	49	−13	33	
7	Vëllaznimi	27	8	5	14	22	36	−14	29	
8	Onix Banjë	27	7	7	13	26	45	−19	28	
9	Drenasi	27	5	10	12	26	40	−14	25	
10	Vushtrria	27	4	8	15	17	51	−34	20	Continued to stay in the First Football League of Kosovo after merging with Dardana.

Updated to match(es) played on 2 April 2021. Source: Football Federation of Kosovo (in Albanian), TopSporti (in Albanian)
Rules for classification: 1) Points; 2) Head-to-head points; 3) Head-to-head goal difference; 4) Goal difference; 5) Goals scored; 6) Play-offs (only if needed to decide champions or teams for promotion).
(O) Play-off winners; (P) Promoted

=== Group B ===
Pos	Team	Pld	W	D	L	GF	GA	GD	Pts	Promotion, qualification or relegation
1	Ulpiana (P)	27	15	8	4	40	19	+21	53	Promotion to 2021–22 Football Superleague of Kosovo
2	Flamurtari (X)	27	14	10	3	43	20	+23	52	Qualification to promotion play-offs
3	2 Korriku	27	13	3	11	43	30	+13	42	
4	Vitia	27	9	8	10	33	36	−3	35	
5	Kika	27	10	4	13	33	42	−9	34	
6	Ramiz Sadiku	27	8	8	11	24	30	−6	32	
7	Dardana	27	8	8	11	25	35	−10	32	It merges with Vushtrria after the end of the season.
8	Vllaznia Pozheran	27	8	7	12	24	42	−18	31	
9	Ferizaj	27	7	9	11	31	38	−7	30	
10	KEK (R)	27	7	7	13	24	32	−8	28	Relegation to 2021–22 Second Football League of Kosovo

Updated to match(es) played on 28 March 2021. Source: Football Federation of Kosovo (in Albanian), TopSporti (in Albanian)
Rules for classification: 1) Points; 2) Head-to-head points; 3) Head-to-head goal difference; 4) Goal difference; 5) Goals scored; 6) Play-offs (only if needed to decide champions or teams for promotion).
(P) Promoted; (R) Relegated; (X) Eliminated on Qualification to promotion play-offs

== Qualification to promotion play-offs ==
=== Semi-final ===
21 May 2021
15:00

Dukagjini	2–1	Flamurtari
Gashi 23'; Osmani 72'	Report	Shala 83'

Rexhep Rexhepi Stadium, Glogovac, Kosovo
Attendance: 0
Referee: Shpëtim Murtezi (Kosovo)

=== Final ===
28 May 2021
16:00

Trepça '89	1–1 (a.e.t.)	Dukagjini
Shala 30'	Report (FFK); Report (TS)	Osmani 52'
Penalties
Berisha (penalty scored); Arb. Muja (penalty scored); Jashari (penalty missed); Ard. Muja (penalty missed); Rrahmani (penalty scored)	3–4	(penalty scored) Osmani; (penalty scored) Kerim; (penalty missed) Basriu; (penalty scored) Merlaku; (penalty scored) Mulaj

Fadil Vokrri Stadium, Pristina, Kosovo
Attendance: 0
Referee: Mervan Bejtullahu (Kosovo)

== Notes and references ==
=== Notes ===
1. Due to the COVID-19 pandemic in Kosovo, all matches of this season will be played behind closed doors until another decision.
2. Vushtrria initially relegated to the 2021–22 Second Football League of Kosovo, but after merging with Dardana, Vushtrria continued to stay in the First Football League of Kosovo, but in Group B taking the place of Dardana after the place of Vushtrria in Group A was taken by Rahoveci.
