= 2019–20 First Football League of Kosovo =

First Football League of Kosovo
- Season: 2019–20
- Dates: 23 August 2019 – 9 March 2020
- Champions: Besa
- Promoted: Besa; Arbëria
- Relegated: none
- Matches: 160
- Goals: 393 (2.46 per match)
- Biggest home win: Onix Banjë 7–0 Vllaznia Pozheran (3 November 2019)
- Biggest away win: Vëllaznimi 1–4 Vllaznia Pozheran (7 October 2019)
- Highest scoring: Vitia 4–4 2 Korriku (2 December 2019)
- All statistics correct as of December 27, 2019.

The 2019–20 First Football League of Kosovo season is the 21st season of second-tier football in Kosovo. The season began on 23 August 2019. Due to the COVID-19 pandemic the league was suspended on 9 March 2020. On 27 May 2020 the league was cancelled by the FFK with no relegated teams and Besa Peje and Arberia are promoted to the Superliga.

== Team changes ==
The following teams have changed division since the 2018–19 season.

=== To First League ===
Promoted from Second Football League of Kosovo

- Dardana
- Malisheva
- Ulpiana

Relegated from Football Superleague of Kosovo

- Liria
- Trepca

=== From First League ===
Promoted to Football Superleague of Kosovo

- Dukagjini
- Vushtrria

Relegated to Second Football League of Kosovo

- Bashkimi Koretin
- Fushë Kosova
- Kika

== Stadiums ==
Club	Location	Stadium	Capacity
2 Korriku	Pristina	Fusha Sportive 2 Korriku	1,000
Arbëria	Lipljan	Sami Kelmendi Stadium	3,200
Besa	Peć	Shahin Haxhiislami Stadium	8,500
Dardana	Kamenicë	Agush Isufi Stadium	1,500
Drenasi	Glogovac	Rexhep Rexhepi Stadium	6,000
Istogu	Istok	Demush Mavraj Stadium	1,000
KEK	Obilić	Agron Rama Stadium	5,000
Liria	Prizren	Përparim Thaçi Stadium	10,000
Malisheva	Mališevo	Liman Gegaj Stadium	1,800
Onix	Pećka Banja	Onix Banjë Stadium	1,500
Ramiz Sadiku	Pristina	Ramiz Sadiku Stadium	5,000
Trepça	Mitrovica	Adem Jashari Olympic Stadium	18,500
Ulpiana	Lipljan	Sami Kelmendi Stadium	3,200
Vëllaznimi	Gjakova	Gjakova City Stadium	6,000
Vitia	Vitina	Vitia City Stadium	1,000
Vllaznia	Požaranje	Ibrahim Kurteshi Stadium	1,000

== League table ==
Pos	Team	Pld	W	D	L	GF	GA	GD	Pts	Qualification or relegation
1	Besa (C, P)	20	12	4	4	29	11	+18	40 (Note: Besa deducted three points for unpaid player wages. On 21 February 2020, the FFK revoked the point deduction of Besa)	Promotion to the 2020–21 Football Superleague of Kosovo
2	Arbëria (P)	20	10	6	4	34	26	+8	36	Promotion to the 2020–21 Football Superleague of Kosovo
3	Liria	20	8	7	5	23	15	+8	31	
4	Istogu	20	8	7	5	22	18	+4	31	
5	Drenasi	20	8	6	6	25	18	+7	30	
6	2 Korriku	20	9	3	8	31	26	+5	30	
7	Malisheva	20	9	3	8	23	18	+5	30	
8	Dardana	20	8	6	6	22	23	−1	30	
9	Onix	20	8	5	7	25	16	+9	29	
10	KEK	20	7	7	6	23	19	+4	28	
11	Trepça	20	6	5	9	25	35	−10	23	
12	Ulpiana	20	5	7	8	22	26	−4	22	
13	Vllaznia Pozheran	20	6	3	11	27	42	−15	21	
14	Ramiz Sadiku	20	5	5	10	22	29	−7	20	
15	Vitia	20	3	8	9	20	33	−13	17	
16	Vëllaznimi	20	3	8	9	20	38	−18	17	

Updated to match(es) played on 9 March 2020. Source: Football Federation of Kosovo (in Albanian)
Rules for classification: 1) Points; 2) Goal difference; 3) Number of goals scored; 4) Head-to-head results; 5) Play-offs (only if needed to decide teams for promotion or relegation).
(C) Champions; (P) Promoted
