= 2021–22 Kosovar Cup =

Tournament details
- Country: Kosovo
- Teams: 34

Final positions
- Champions: Llapi
- Runners-up: Drita

Tournament statistics
- Matches played: 34
- Goals scored: 107 (3.15 per match)
- Top goal scorer(s): Enis Miranaj; Erduan Ibrahimi (3 goals each)
- All statistics correct as of 13 April 2022.

The 2021–22 Kosovar Cup is the football knockout competition of Kosovo in the 2021–22 season.

== Preliminary round ==
The teams of the Third League and the Second League, through elimination come up to 2 winning teams which are then joined in the Round of 32.

| No | Date | Matches | | |
|---|---|---|---|---|
| 1 | 27.10.2021 | KEK-u (III) | 5–0 | Mati (IV) |
| 2 | 27.10.2021 | Prizreni (III) | 3–1 | Fortuna Drenas (IV) |

== Round of 32 ==
The draw for the Round of 32 (second round) was held on 29 November 2021 in Football Federation of Kosovo's offices. 32 teams from Kosovo Superleague, First League and Second League participated in this round.

=== Summary ===
The matches were played on 1 December and 2 December 2021. All matches started at 12:30 CET.

| No | Date | Matches | | |
|---|---|---|---|---|
| 1 | 01.12.2021 | Ramiz Sadiku (II) | 1–1 (2–1 a.e.t.) | Vushtrria (II) |
| 2 | 01.12.2021 | Feronikeli (II) | 0–0 (1–4 p) | Fushë Kosova (II) |
| 3 | 01.12.2021 | KF A&N (II) | 0–1 | Gjilani (I) |
| 4 | 01.12.2021 | Drenica (I) | 3–1 | Vllaznia Pozheran (II) |
| 5 | 01.12.2021 | Besa (II) | 0–4 | Prishtina (I) |
| 6 | 01.12.2021 | Malisheva (I) | 1-0 | Istogu (II) |
| 7 | 01.12.2021 | Ulpiana (I) | 3–0 | Vëllaznimi (II) |
| 8 | 01.12.2021 | Rahoveci (II) | 1–3 | Ballkani (I) |
| 9 | 01.12.2021 | Trepça '89 (II) | 2–2 (3–4 p) | 2 Korriku (II) |
| 10 | 01.12.2021 | Llapi (I) | 2–1 | Kika Hogosht (II) |
| 11 | 01.12.2021 | Prizreni (III) | 1-5 | Phoenix-Banjë (II) |
| 12 | 02.12.2021 | Drita (I) | 0–0 (1–0 a.e.t.) | Drenasi (II) |
| 13 | 02.12.2021 | Liria (II) | 2–4 | Dukagjini (I) |
| 14 | 02.12.2021 | Arbëria (II) | 4–0 | Vitia (II) |
| 15 | 02.12.2021 | KEK-u (III) | 1–0 | Trepça (II) |
| 16 | 02.12.2021 | Flamurtari (II) | 0–0 (0–3 a.e.t.) | Ferizaj (II) |

== Round of 16 ==
The draw for the Round of 16 was held on 7 December 2021. 9 teams from the Kosovo Superleague, 6 from the First League and only one from the Second League will participate in this round.

=== Summary ===
The matches will be played from 5 February until 7 February 2022. All matches will start at 13:00 CET.

| No | Date | Matches | | |
|---|---|---|---|---|
| 1 | 05.02.2022 | Gjilani (I) | 2–1 | Dukagjini (I) |
| 2 | 05.02.2022 | 2 Korriku (II) | 1–6 | Ramiz Sadiku (II) |
| 3 | 05.02.2022 | Phoenix-Banjë (II) | 0–3 Awarded (Note: https://www.ffk-kosova.com/kg-aprovon-ankesen-e-kf-kek-u/) | KEK-u (III) |
| 4 | 05.02.2022 | Ulpiana (I) | 1–1 (2–1 a.e.t.) | Arbëria (II) |
| 5 | 06.02.2022 | Prishtina (I) | 1–1 (2–1 a.e.t.) | Drenica (I) |
| 6 | 06.02.2022 | Ballkani (I) | 1–0 | Malisheva (I) |
| 7 | 06.02.2022 | Fushë Kosova (II) | 0–5 | Drita (I) |
| 8 | 07.02.2022 | Ferizaj (II) | 0–2 | Llapi (I) |

== Quarter-finals ==
The draw for the Quarter-finals was held on 10 February 2022.

=== Summary ===
The matches will take place on 16 and 17 March 2022.

| No | Date | Matches | | |
|---|---|---|---|---|
| 1 | 16.03.2022 | Drita (I) | 3–0 | Ulpiana (I) |
| 2 | 16.03.2022 | Llapi (I) | 2–0 | Gjilani (I) |
| 3 | 16.03.2022 | Ballkani (I) | 1–1 (1–2 a.e.t.) | Prishtina (I) |
| 4 | 17.03.2022 | Ramiz Sadiku (II) | 2–1 | KEK-u (III) |

== Semi-finals ==
The draw for the Semifinals was held on 31 March 2022. The first semifinal matches took place on April 7, while the return matches will be played on April 13.

=== First leg ===
| 7 April 2022 | Drita | 3–0 | Ramiz Sadiku | Gjilan |
| 14:00 (UTC+2) | Krasniqi 8'; Namani 13'; Jashari 39' | Report | | Stadium: Gjilan City Stadium; Referee: Lirim Jashari |

| 7 April 2022 | Prishtina | 2–1 | Llapi | Pristina |
| 14:00 (UTC+2) | Mici 36'; Krasniqi 84' | Report | Ramadani 62' | Stadium: Fadil Vokrri Stadium; Referee: Shpëtim Murtezi |

=== Second leg ===
| 13 April 2022 | Ramiz Sadiku | 2–2 (2–5 agg.) | Drita | Pristina |
| 14:00 (UTC+2) | Misini 51'; Musa 66' | Report | Tahiri 86'; Kryeziu 90+2' | Stadium: Ramiz Sadiku Stadium; Referee: Lirim Jashari |

| 13 April 2022 | Llapi | 2–0 (3–2 agg.) | Prishtina | Podujevë |
| 14:00 (UTC+2) | Bianor 58'; Rivera 79' | Report | | Stadium: Zahir Pajaziti Stadium; Referee: Shpëtim Murtezi |

== Final ==
26 May 2022
20:00 CEST

| Drita | 1–2 | Llapi |
|---|---|---|
| Ardian Nuhiu 37' | | Francisci Rivera 6'; Arbnor Ramadani 48' |

Fadil Vokrri Stadium, Pristina
Attendance: 7,000
Referee: Besfort Kosumi

== Statistics ==
=== Top scorers ===
As of matches played on 13 April 2022

| Rank | Player | Club | Goals |
|---|---|---|---|
| 1 | (Kosovo) Enis Miranaj | Phoenix-Banjë | 3 |
| 1 | (Kosovo) Erduan Ibrahimi | Ramiz Sadiku | 3 |
| 2 | (Nigeria) Otto John | Prishtina | 2 |
| 2 | (Kosovo) Kreshnik Uka | Drenica | 2 |
| 2 | (Brazil) Elton Calé | Gjilani | 2 |
| 2 | (Kosovo) Adonis Përvetica | KEK-u | 2 |
| 2 | (Kosovo) Arbnor Muja | Drita | 2 |
