= 2020–21 Football Superleague of Kosovo =

Football Superleague of Kosovo
- Season: 2020–21
- Dates: 18 September 2020 – 23 May 2021
- Champions: Prishtina
- Relegated: Trepça '89; Arbëria; Besa Pejë
- Champions League: Prishtina
- Europa Conference League: Drita; Llapi
- Matches: 180
- Goals: 474 (2.63 per match)
- Top goalscorer: Mirlind Daku (31 goals)
- Biggest home win: Ballkani 5–0 Drenica (4 October 2020); Llapi 5–0 Trepça '89 (10 November 2020)
- Biggest away win: Arbëria 2–6 Ballkani (11 March 2021)
- Highest scoring: Arbëria 2–6 Ballkani (11 March 2021)
- Lowest attendance: 0
- All statistics correct as of 23 May 2021.

The 2020–21 Football Superleague of Kosovo season was the 22nd season of top-tier football in Kosovo. The season began on 18 September 2020 and ended on 23 May 2021. A total of 10 teams competed in the league: eight teams from the 2019–20 season and two teams from the 2019–20 First Football League of Kosovo. Drita were the defending champions from the previous season.

== Teams ==
Ten teams competed in the league – the top eight teams from the previous season and the two teams promoted from the First Football League of Kosovo. The promoted teams are Besa Pejë and Arbëria. They replaced Flamurtari, Vushtrria, Dukagjini and Ferizaj.

=== Stadiums and locations ===
Locations of the 2020–21 Football Superleague of Kosovo teams

Note: Table lists in alphabetical order.

Club	Town	Stadium and capacity		UEFA license
Arbëria	Dobrajë e Madhe (Lipljan)	Sami Kelmendi Stadium	3,200	No
Arbëria	Dobrajë e Madhe (Lipljan)	Agron Rama Stadium	5,000	No
Ballkani	Suva Reka	Suva Reka City Stadium	1,500	Yes
Besa Pejë	Peja	Shahin Haxhiislami Stadium	8,500	No
Besa Pejë	Peja	Tahir Vokshi Stadium	1,500	No
Drenica	Skenderaj	Bajram Aliu Stadium	3,000	Yes
Drita	Gjilan	Gjilan City Stadium	15,000	Yes
Feronikeli	Drenas	Rexhep Rexhepi Stadium	2,000	Yes
Gjilani	Gjilan	Gjilan City Stadium	15,000	Yes
Llapi	Podujevo	Zahir Pajaziti Stadium	10,000	Yes
Prishtina	Pristina	Fadil Vokrri Stadium	13,000	Yes
Trepça '89	Mitrovica	Riza Lushta Stadium	12,000	Yes

=== Personnel and kits ===
Team	Manager	Captain	Kit manufacturer	Shirt sponsor(s)	
Arbëria	(Kosovo) Arbnor Morina	(Kosovo) Hysen Bytyqi	(Kosovo) SHAFF	(Kosovo) Restaurant Marigona	
Ballkani	(Kosovo) Ardian Basha	(Kosovo) Visar Berisha	(Italy) Macron	(Kosovo) Cima Construction	
Besa Pejë	(Kosovo) Leotrim Krasniqi	(Kosovo) Donart Sheqerolli	(Italy) Erreà	(Kosovo) Elkos Group	
Drenica	(Kosovo) Sami Sermaxhaj	(Kosovo) Azem Bejta	(Kosovo) SHAFF	(Kosovo) ILEAA-GR SH.P.K	
Drita	(North Macedonia) Ardian Nuhiu	(Kosovo) Ardian Limani	(Italy) Macron	(Switzerland) JB Automotive AG	
Feronikeli	(Kosovo) Faruk Elshani	(Kosovo) Lapidar Lladrovci	(Italy) Macron	(Montenegro) Porto Budva	
Gjilani	(Kosovo) Ismet Munishi	(Kosovo) Ylber Kastrati	(Spain) Joma	(Kosovo) Tali SH.P.K	
Llapi	(Kosovo) Tahir Batatina	(Kosovo) Mentor Zhdrella	(United States) Nike	(Germany) FF Bauunternehmung	(Kosovo) N.N.T ABC
Prishtina	(North Macedonia) Zekirija Ramadani	(Kosovo) Lorik Boshnjaku	(Germany) Jako	(Kosovo) Beni Dona	(Kosovo) Eurokoha
Prishtina	(North Macedonia) Zekirija Ramadani	(Kosovo) Lorik Boshnjaku	(Germany) Jako	(Slovenia) (Kosovo) NLB Banka Prishtina	(Italy) (Kosovo) Rio Mare
Trepça '89	(Kosovo) Shpëtim Idrizi	(Kosovo) Ardian Muja	(Kosovo) SHAFF	(Denmark) (Kosovo) JYSK Kosova	(United States) (Kosovo) KFC Kosova

== League table ==
Pos	Team	Pld	W	D	L	GF	GA	GD	Pts	Qualification or relegation
1	Prishtina (C)	36	24	6	6	65	27	+38	78	Qualification for the Champions League preliminary round
2	Drita	36	22	10	4	59	28	+31	76	Qualification for the Europa Conference League first qualifying round
3	Ballkani	36	23	5	8	79	43	+36	74	
4	Gjilani	36	12	12	12	37	38	−1	48	
5	Llapi	36	13	4	19	49	56	−7	43	Qualification for the Europa Conference League first qualifying round (Note: Llapi qualified for the Europa Conference League first qualifying round by winning the 2020–21 Kosovar Cup.)
6	Drenica	36	10	12	14	34	48	−14	42	
7	Feronikeli	36	10	12	14	44	36	+8	42	
8	Trepça '89 (R)	36	12	6	18	38	54	−16	42	Qualification for the relegation play-offs
9	Arbëria (R)	36	11	7	18	42	58	−16	40	Relegation to First Football League of Kosovo
10	Besa Pejë (R)	36	3	6	27	27	86	−59	15	Relegation to First Football League of Kosovo

Source: Football Federation of Kosovo (in Albanian), TopSporti (in Albanian)
Rules for classification: 1) Points; 2) Head-to-head points; 3) Head-to-head goal difference; 4) Goal difference; 5) Goals scored; 6) Play-offs (only if needed to decide champions, teams for relegation or teams for UEFA competitions).
(C) Champions; (R) Relegated

== Results ==
=== First half of season ===
Home \ Away	ARB	BAL	BES	DRE	DRI	FRN	GJI	LLA	PRI	T89
Arbëria	—	2–4	1–0	1–0	0–1	0–0	1–0	1–2	1–1	1–2
Ballkani	2–1	—	4–1	5–0	2–0	3–2	0–4	4–2	2–1	2–0
Besa Pejë	0–3	1–4	—	0–0	1–4	1–1	1–2	2–2	0–2	2–1
Drenica	0–1	1–2	2–1	—	0–3	1–0	0–0	0–1	1–0	2–1
Drita	1–1	2–1	3–1	4–1	—	1–1	0–0	1–0	0–0	1–0
Feronikeli	1–0	1–1	3–0	2–2	1–2	—	4–0	1–0	1–2	2–0
Gjilani	3–1	0–0	1–0	1–0	2–3	0–0	—	2–0	0–3	0–0
Llapi	2–0	1–3	2–0	0–1	1–2	3–2	0–1	—	0–2	5–0
Prishtina	1–0	2–1	4–0	3–0	1–1	0–0	0–2	0–0	—	4–2
Trepça '89	0–2	4–3	4–2	0–0	0–1	0–0	3–0	1–0	1–0	—

Source: Soccerway
Legend: Blue = home team win; Yellow = draw; Red = away team win.
For upcoming matches, an "a" indicates there is an article about the rivalry between the two participants.

=== Second half of season ===
Home \ Away	ARB	BAL	BES	DRE	DRI	FRN	GJI	LLA	PRI	T89
Arbëria	—	2–6	2–1	1–1	1–3	0–3	3–4	3–2	0–4	0–1
Ballkani	2–3	—	4–1	2–1	0–0	1–0	1–0	1–0	0–1	4–3
Besa Pejë	0–3	0–3	—	1–2	1–1	2–1	1–0	1–4	0–3	1–2
Drenica	1–1	2–1	0–0	—	0–3	1–1	0–0	4–2	0–1	2–0
Drita	2–0	1–1	3–1	1–1	—	3–1	2–0	1–0	1–2	1–2
Feronikeli	0–1	0–2	3–1	1–3	0–1	—	1–1	4–0	2–0	3–0
Gjilani	1–1	1–1	5–1	0–0	1–1	1–0	—	0–2	1–2	2–1
Llapi	4–3	1–0	1–0	3–3	2–4	1–1	3–1	—	1–3	2–1
Prishtina	2–0	2–5	5–1	3–1	2–0	2–1	0–0	2–0	—	3–1
Trepça '89	1–1	0–2	1–1	2–1	0–1	0–0	2–1	1–0	1–2	—

Source: Soccerway
Legend: Blue = home team win; Yellow = draw; Red = away team win.
For upcoming matches, an "a" indicates there is an article about the rivalry between the two participants.

=== Relegation play-offs ===
28 May 2021
16:00

Trepça '89	1–1 (a.e.t.)	Dukagjini
Shala 30'	Report (FFK); Report (TS)	Osmani 52'
Penalties
Berisha (penalty scored); Arb. Muja (penalty scored); Jashari (penalty missed); Ard. Muja (penalty missed); Rrahmani (penalty scored)	3–4	(penalty scored) Osmani; (penalty scored) Kerim; (penalty missed) Basriu; (penalty scored) Merlaku; (penalty scored) Mulaj

Fadil Vokrri Stadium, Pristina, Kosovo
Attendance: 0
Referee: Mervan Bejtullahu (Kosovo)

== Season statistics ==
=== Top scorers ===
As of 23 May 2021

#	Player	Club	Goals
1	(Kosovo) Mirlind Daku	Ballkani	31
2	(North Macedonia) Marko Simonovski	Feronikeli	12
3	(Brazil) Marclei	Arbëria	10
3	(Nigeria) Otto John	Prishtina	10
5	(Kosovo) Betim Haxhimusa	Drita	9
5	(Albania) Gerhard Progni	Gjilani	9
5	(Kosovo) Leotrim Kryeziu	Prishtina	9
8	(Kosovo) Ardit Tahiri	Besa Pejë	8
8	(Kosovo) Kastriot Rexha	Drita	8
8	(Kosovo) Besnik Krasniqi	Prishtina	8

=== Hat-tricks ===
- Player in italic is not part of the Superleague.

Player	For	Against	Result	Date	Round
(Kosovo) Mirlind Daku	Ballkani	Besa Pejë	1–4 (A)	19 September 2020	1
(Albania) Bedri Greca	Feronikeli	Gjilani	4–0 (H)	20 September 2020	1
(Kosovo) Mirlind Daku	Ballkani	Feronikeli	3–2 (H)	23 September 2020	2
(Nigeria) Otto John	Prishtina	Besa Pejë	4–0 (H)	17 October 2020	6
(Ghana) Bismark Charles	Trepça '89	Ballkani	4–3 (H)	25 October 2020	8
(Albania) Ardit Hila	Gjilani	Ballkani	0–4 (A)	19 December 2020	12
(Kosovo) Mirlind Daku	Ballkani	Arbëria	2–6 (A)	11 March 2021	24

== Notes and references ==
=== Notes ===
1. Due to the COVID-19 pandemic in Kosovo, all matches of this season will be played behind closed doors until another decision.
2. This season was the 22nd season under the name Football Superleague of Kosovo, the 28th season of top-tier football in Kosovo and the 74th season of football in Kosovo overall.
3. Arbëria played its matches in three stadiums as Agron Rama Stadium (Obilić), Zahir Pajaziti Stadium (Podujevo) and Gjilan Synthetic Grass Stadium (Gjilan), instead of their regular stadium Sami Kelmendi Stadium (Dobrajë e Madhe), which was under reconstruction.
4. Besa Pejë will play their home matches at Tahir Vokshi Stadium (village Bresovik of Peć), instead of their regular stadium Shahin Haxhiislami Stadium (Peć), which was under reconstruction.
5. The two teams, Drita and Gjilan, which use this stadium together with their fans, have named the stadium with different names. Drita and their fans call the stadium as Selami Osmani-Bezi Stadium, while Gjilan and their fans call the stadium as Agim Ramadani Stadium, but officially the stadium is called Gjilan City Stadium.
