= Simon Loshi =

Dutch footballer (born 2000)

Personal information
- Date of birth: 16 February 2000 (age 26)
- Place of birth: Tilburg, Netherlands
- Height: 1.79 m (5 ft 10 in)
- Position: Right-back

Team information
- Current team: Esperanza Pelt
- Number: 27

Youth career
- –2009: Willem II
- 2009–2018: Feyenoord

Senior career*
Years	Team	Apps	(Gls)
2018–2019	Feyenoord U19	7	(0)
2019–2020	Jong ADO	8	(0)
2020	Feronikeli	9	(0)
2020–2021	Resovia	0	(0)
2021–2022	Feronikeli	11	(0)
2022	ASWH	7	(0)
2022–2023	Hoogstraten VV	7	(0)
2024–2025	Wezel Sport	6	(0)
2025	Cappellen		
2025–	Esperanza Pelt	17	(9)
- * Club domestic league appearances and goals as of 8 February 2026

Simon Loshi (16 February 2000) is a footballer who plays as a right-back for Belgian Division 3 club Esperanza Pelt. Born in the Netherlands, he represented Kosovo at international level.

== Club career ==
=== Willem II, Feyenoord and Jong ADO ===
Loshi played in his youth at Willem II and, for ten years, at Feyenoord.

On 3 July 2019, Loshi joined Derde Divisie side Jong ADO. His debut with Jong ADO came on 1 September in a 5–0 away defeat against OSS '20, substituting Nadir Achahbar in the 81st minute.

=== 2019–2022: Feronikeli and Resovia ===
On 3 December 2019, Loshi joined Feronikeli in the Kosovo Superleague. On 12 February 2020, he made his professional cup debut with Feronikeli in the 2019–20 Kosovar Cup quarter-finals against Liria Prizren starting line-up. Ten days later, he made his professional league debut in a 2–1 away defeat against Llapi, again in the starting line-up.

On 5 September 2020, Loshi joined Polish I liga side Resovia after agreeing to a one-year contract with an option to extend it for two years. He did not play a single game for the club. In the winter break of the 2020–21 season, his contract was terminated.

On 1 February 2021, Loshi returned to Feronikeli. Fourteen days later he was fielded, playing in the 1–1 home draw against Gjilani, after replacing Adem Maliqi in the 89th minute.

=== 2022–2023: ASWH and Hoogstraten ===
On 7 February 2022, Loshi and his brother Skender joined the Dutch Tweede Divisie side ASWH. Before the season ended, the Loshis and ASWH separated.

In the 2022–23 season, Simon Loshi played for Hoogstraten VV in Belgium.

== International career ==
On 15 March 2021, Loshi received a call-up from the Kosovo under-21 side for friendly matches against Qatar under-23. He was an unused substitute in these matches.
