= Drilon Cenaj =

Albanian footballer

Personal information
- Date of birth: 12 September 1997 (age 29)
- Place of birth: Gjakova, FR Yugoslavia
- Height: 1.85 m (6 ft 1 in)
- Position: Midfielder

Team information
- Current team: Feronikeli
- Number: 34

Youth career
- 2001–2013: Sarajevo
- 2013–2015: Puskás Akadémia
- 2015–2016: Chievo

Senior career*
Years	Team	Apps	(Gls)
2016–2017	Salernitana	0	(0)
2017	Velež Mostar	1	(0)
2017–2018	Novigrad	16	(2)
2018–2019	Pandurii Târgu Jiu	31	(1)
2019	Botev Vratsa	0	(0)
2019	Viitorul Târgu Jiu	13	(0)
2019–2020	Nyíregyháza	5	(0)
2020	Čelik Zenica	3	(0)
2020	Tuzla City	0	(0)
2020–2022	Szentlőrinc	32	(1)
2022–2023	Prishtina	2	(0)
2023–2024	Fushë Kosova	28	(0)
2024–	Feronikeli	7	(0)

International career^{‡}
2013	Albania U17	2	(0)
- * Club domestic league appearances and goals as of 5 January 2025 ‡ National team caps and goals as of 21 February 2013

Drilon Cenaj (born 12 September 1997) is an Albanian professional footballer who plays as a midfielder for Kosovo Superleague club Feronikeli.

== Club career ==
=== Early career and Salernitana ===
Cenaj is a product of youth team systems of the different Bosnian and Hungarian sides. On 15 September 2015, he signed with under-19 team of Chievo after agreeing to a multiyear deal.

On 2 August 2016, Cenaj signed his first professional contract with Serie B side Salernitana after agreeing to a one-year deal. Five days later, he was named as a Salernitana substitute for the first time in the 2016–17 Coppa Italia second round against Benevento, but was an unused substitute in that match.

=== Velež Mostar ===
On 10 March 2017, Cenaj joined First League of FBiH side Velež Mostar. On 8 April 2017, he made his debut in a 3–0 away defeat against Budućnost Banovići after being named in the starting line-up.

=== Novigrad ===
On 1 August 2017, Cenaj joined Croatian Second League side Novigrad. His debut with Novigrad came eighteen days later in a 1–1 home draw against Varaždin after coming on as a substitute at 56th minute in place of Nemanja Belaković.

=== Pandurii Târgu Jiu ===
On 19 February 2018, Cenaj joined Romanian Liga II side Pandurii Târgu Jiu. On 10 March 2018, he made his debut in a 2–1 home win against Mioveni after coming on as a substitute at 83rd minute in place of Brian Lemac.

=== Botev Vratsa and Viitorul Târgu Jiu ===
On 9 January 2019, Cenaj joined Bulgarian First Professional League side Botev Vratsa. A month later, he joined Romanian Liga II side Viitorul Târgu Jiu. On 23 February 2019, he made his debut in a 0–2 away defeat against Universitatea Cluj after being named in the starting line-up.

=== Nyíregyháza ===
On 12 July 2019, Cenaj joined Nemzeti Bajnokság II side Nyíregyháza. On 18 August 2019, he made his debut in a 3–0 home win against Békéscsaba after being named in the starting line-up.

=== Čelik Zenica ===
On 17 February 2020, Cenaj joined Bosnian Premier League side Čelik Zenica after agreeing to a one-and-a-half-year deal. His debut with Čelik Zenica came six days later in a 0–2 away defeat against Zrinjski Mostar after coming on as a substitute at 46th minute in place of Marko Perišić.

=== Tuzla City and Szentlőrinc ===
On 26 June 2020, Cenaj joined Bosnian Premier League side Tuzla City. However, less than two months later, on 18 August, he suddenly left the club. On 22 October 2020, he joined Nemzeti Bajnokság II side Szentlőrinc. His debut with Szentlőrinc came three days later in a 3–0 away win against Békéscsaba after coming on as a substitute at 72nd minute in place of Alexander Torvund.

=== Prishtina ===
On 21 January 2022, Cenaj joined Kosovo Superleague side Prishtina after agreeing to a one-and-a-half-year deal. On 7 April 2022, he was named as a Prishtina substitute for the first time in the 2021–22 Kosovar Cup semi-finals against Llapi. His debut with Prishtina came on 4 May in a 5–0 home win against Feronikeli after being named in the starting line-up.

=== Fushë Kosova ===
In August 2023, Cenaj joined Kosovo Superleague side Fushë Kosova. His debut with Fushë Kosova came on 19 August in a 1–6 away defeat against Malisheva after being named in the starting line-up.

== International career ==
During the 2012–13 period, Cenaj represented Bosnia and Herzegovina at the U15, and U17 level. In February 2013, he becomes part of Albania U17 with which he made his debut in a 1–1 away draw against Italy after being named in the starting line-up. On 15 March 2014, Cenaj returned to represent Bosnia and Herzegovina again by accepting their call-up from the under-17 team for the 2014 UEFA European Under-17 Championship elite round, but due to injury, could not be part of the national team. In addition to Albania and Bosnia and Herzegovina, he has the right to represent his homeland, Kosovo at the international level.
