= Kristi Kote =

Albanian footballer

Personal information
- Date of birth: 26 September 1998 (age 28)
- Place of birth: Korçë, Albania
- Height: 1.74 m (5 ft 9 in)
- Position: Central midfielder

Team information
- Current team: Istogu
- Number: 20

Youth career
- 2012–2017: Skënderbeu

Senior career*
Years	Team	Apps	(Gls)
2017–2018	Liria Prizren		
2018–2022	Partizani	69	(1)
2019–2022	→ Partizani B	1	(0)
2022	Kukësi	6	(0)
2023	Bylis Ballsh	2	(0)
2023	Erzeni	5	(0)
2024	Fushë Kosova	30	(2)
2024–2026	Trepça	17+	(1+)
2026–	Istogu	0	(0)

International career
2013–2014	Albania U17	4	(0)
2016	Albania U19	1	(0)
- * Club domestic league appearances and goals as of 9 September 2025

Kristi Kote (born 26 September 1998) is an Albanian professional footballer who plays as a central midfielder for Istogu.

== Career ==
=== Fushë Kosova ===
On 4 February 2024, Kote signed for Fushë Kosova of the Football Superleague of Kosovo.

=== Trepça ===
On 29 December 2024, Kote signed for Trepça of the First Football League of Kosovo.

== Personal life ==
His younger brother Gjergji Kote is also a professional footballer and currently plays for Partizani.

== Honours ==
FK Partizani Tirana

- Kategoria Superiore: 2018–19
- Albanian Supercup: 2019
