= Berat Ahmeti =

Kosovar footballer

Personal information
- Date of birth: 26 January 1995 (age 31)
- Place of birth: Pristina, FR Yugoslavia
- Height: 1.77 m (5 ft 9 1/2 in)
- Position: Attacking midfielder

Team information
- Current team: Vëllaznimi

Youth career
- 2005–2009: Flamurtari
- 2009–2013: Prishtina

Senior career*
Years	Team	Apps	(Gls)
2013–2014	Prishtina		
2014	Újpest	4	(0)
2015–2016	Vllaznia	16	(1)
2016–2017	Gjilani	0	(0)
2018–2019	Feronikeli		
2019–2020	Trepça'89	23	(2)
2021	Ulpiana		
2021–2022	Feronikeli	16	(0)
2022–2023	Drenica	22	(0)
2023–2024	Vëllaznimi		
2024–2026	Fushë Kosova		
2026–	Mitrovica		

International career^{‡}
2013	Albania U-19	1	(0)
- * Club domestic league appearances and goals as of 20 April 2023 ‡ National team caps and goals as of 15 October 2013

Berat Ahmeti (born 26 January 1995) is a Kosovar footballer who plays as a forward for Vëllaznimi.

== Career statistics ==
=== Club ===
As of 7 August 2016

Club	Season	League			Cup (Note: Including cup competitions, such as the Magyar Kupa and Albanian Cup)		Continental (Note: Including continental competitions, such as UEFA Champions League and UEFA Europa League)		Other (Note: Including other competitions, such as the Ligakupa and Albanian Supercup)		Total	
Club	Season	Division	Apps	Goals	Apps	Goals	Apps	Goals	Apps	Goals	Apps	Goals
Újpest	2014–15	OTP Bank Liga	4	0	4	0	—		7	2	15	2
Újpest	Total		4	0	4	0	—		7	2	15	2
Vllaznia	2015–16	Albanian Superliga	16	1	3	0	—		—		19	1
Vllaznia	Total		16	1	3	0	—		—		19	1
Career total			20	1	7	0	0	0	7	2	34	3

== Honours ==
Újpest

- Hungarian Super Cup (1): 2014–15
