= Argjent Mustafa =

Kosovar-Albanian footballer

Personal information
- Date of birth: 30 August 1992 (age 34)
- Place of birth: Vushtrri, FR Yugoslavia
- Height: 1.75 m (5 ft 9 in)
- Position: Attacking midfielder

Youth career
- –2008: Vushtrria
- 2008–2009: Prishtina

Senior career*
Years	Team	Apps	(Gls)
2009–2011	Prishtina		
2009–2010	→ Vushtrria (loan)		
2011–2012	Trepça		
2012–2014	Besa Kavajë	40	(1)
2014	Partizani Tirana	6	(0)
2015–2016	Laçi	46	(4)
2016–2017	Tirana	0	(0)
2017–2018	Kamza	1	(0)
2018	Vushtrria		
2018–2019	Flamurtari	31	(0)
2019–2021	Drenica	19	(2)
2021–2022	Ulpiana	20	(1)

International career
2013	Kosovo U21	1	(1)
- * Club domestic league appearances and goals

Argjent Mustafa (born 30 August 1992) is a Kosovar-Albanian former professional footballer who played as an attacking midfielder.

== Club career ==
=== Early career ===
Mustafa began his career at his local team Kosova Vushtrri, where he played for the youth teams. He joined FC Prishtina in 2008 and played for their youth team for a year before joining the senior team. He was loaned back out to Kosova Vushtrri in October 2009 for the remainder of the 2009–10 season.

=== Partizani Tirana ===
Mustafa signed a three-year contract with Partizani Tirana on 29 May 2014 on a free transfer and he was unveiled to the media the same day. He made his official debut with the team on the opening day of the 2014–15 season in a 1–1 draw against Laçi, where he came on at half time for Jurgen Vatnikaj. After making 10 appearances in the first part of the season, including 6 in league, Mustafa announced his departure by breaking his contract with the club.

=== Laçi ===
Shortly after he left Partizani Tirana he joined another Albanian Superliga side in the shape of KF Laçi as a free agent.

=== Tirana ===
On 1 September 2016, Mustafa joined Tirana on a two-year deal. During the course of 2016–17 season, he did not make a single appearance for the club due to injury, as Tirana was relegated for the first time in history and won Albanian Cup for the 16th time, setting a new record.

=== Kamza ===
On 7 August 2017, Mustafa completed a transfer to newly promoted side Kamza by penning a two-year contract.

== International career ==
He was part of the Kosovo national team that participated in the 2008 Coppa Gaetano Scirea, an unofficial friendly tournament which Kosovo were eliminated in the semi-finals in.

== Honours ==
Laçi

- Albanian Cup: 2012–13, 2014–15
