= Iran Júnior =

Brazilian footballer (born 1995)

Personal information
- Full name: Iran da Conceição Gonçalves Júnior
- Date of birth: 10 October 1995 (age 31)
- Place of birth: São Paulo, Brazil
- Height: 1.76 m (5 ft 9 in)
- Position: Attacking midfielder

Team information
- Current team: Madura United
- Number: 10

Youth career
- 2015: América Mineiro

Senior career*
Years	Team	Apps	(Gls)
2016	Ponte Nova	6	(3)
2017	Nacional de Muriaé	10	(2)
2017	Ponte Nova	13	(0)
2018	América-PE	6	(0)
2018	América	7	(0)
2018	Francana	12	(0)
2019	Barretos	11	(1)
2019–2020	Besa	0	(0)
2020–2021	Teuta	10	(0)
2021–2022	Ulpiana	33	(5)
2022–2023	Drita	13	(2)
2023–2024	Dukagjini	22	(1)
2024–	Madura United	51	(6)
- * Club domestic league appearances and goals as of 6 September 2026

Iran da Conceição Gonçalves Júnior (born 10 October 1995) is a Brazilian professional footballer who plays as an attacking midfielder for Super League club Madura United.
