= Church of St. John the Baptist, Banja of Peja =

Church building in Peja, Kosovo

Coordinates: 42°43′5.5″N 20°23′23″E

Church of St. John the Baptist in Peja Banja Црква Зачећа Светог Јована Претече у Пећкој Бањи Kisha e Shën Gjon Pagëzorit
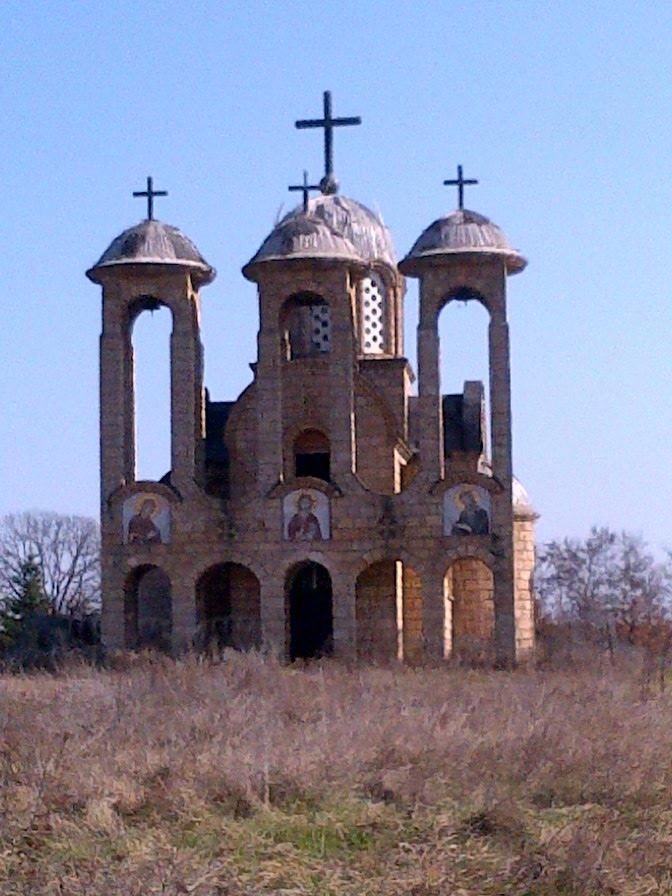
- Church of St. John the Baptist

Religion
- Affiliation: Serbian Orthodox
- Year consecrated: 1998

Location
- Location: Banja of Peja, Kosovo
- Interactive map of Church of St. John the Baptist in Peja Banja; Црква Зачећа Светог Јована Претече у Пећкој Бањи; Kisha e Shën Gjon Pagëzorit

Church of St. John the Baptist in Banja of Peja, in the municipality of Peja, Kosovo, was built in 1998 by Rajović family. It belonged to the Diocese of Raška and Prizren of the Serbian Orthodox Church.

== Architecture ==
The church was designed with complex basis, in three parts with three bell towers. Bell towers are basically open on four sides. A narthex and nave are in the form of an inscribed cross. The authors of the project were Ljubiša Folić and Radomir Folić. The temple was painted by Dragomir Jašović. The frescoes have been painted by a famous Serbian fresco painter and traditional musician Pavle Aksentijević. Mosaics were done by Zdravko Vajagić, and chandelier and crosses were made by Bane Rakalić. The bells were made in the foundry "Popović".

== The destruction of the church in 1999 ==
In 1999, after the arrival of the Italian KFOR troops, the church was burned and damaged by Kosovo Albanians.

== See also ==
- Destroyed Serbian heritage in Kosovo
