= Arlis Shala =

Albanian footballer (born 2000)

Personal information
- Date of birth: 26 July 2000 (age 26)
- Place of birth: Durrës, Albania
- Height: 1.96 m (6 ft 5 in)
- Position: Goalkeeper

Team information
- Current team: Teuta
- Number: 76

Youth career
- 2010–2018: Teuta Durrës
- 2018–2019: Cesena Berretti

Senior career*
Years	Team	Apps	(Gls)
2019	Besa Kavajë	0	(0)
2019	Laçi	0	(0)
2019–2020	Flamurtari	0	(0)
2020	Luftëtari	12	(0)
2020	Llapi	3	(0)
2020–2022	Kastrioti	1	(0)
2022–2023	Drenica	31	(0)
2023–2024	Liria Prizren	23	(0)
2024–2025	Vushtrria	16	(0)
2025–	Teuta	0	(0)

International career
2016	Albania U17	2	(0)
2022–	Albania	0	(0)
- * Club domestic league appearances and goals as of 13 May 2026

Arlis Shala (born 26 July 2000) is an Albanian professional footballer who plays as a goalkeeper for Teuta.

== Club career ==
=== Early career ===
Shala at the age of 10, he started playing football in Teuta Durrës. On 4 February 2017, in an interview for Panorama Sport he confirmed that is in the test at youth club of French club Angers, but unfortunately this test turned out to fail. One year later, he was transferred to Italian club Cesena Berretti. Shala was also part of the Albanian senior clubs like Besa Kavajë (January–July 2019), Laçi (July–August 2019) and Flamurtari (August 2019–January 2020), but unfortunately he was unable to make his debut.

=== Luftëtari ===
In early January 2020, Shala joined Kategoria Superiore side Luftëtari, to replace the departed Panagiotis Paiteris as the second choice. On 31 January 2020, Albanian Football Association confirmed that he had joined as permanent transfer of Luftëtari, after FIFA unlocked the transfer window of Luftëtari that it was blocked due to debt problems. Two days later, Shala made his debut in a 0–3 home defeat against Partizani Tirana after being named in the starting line-up.

=== Llapi ===
On 12 August 2020, Shala signed a three-year contract with Football Superleague of Kosovo club Llapi.

== International career ==
On 29 July 2016, Shala was named as part of the Albania U17 squad for 2016 Kazakhstan President Cup. On 11 August 2016, he made his debut with Albania U17 in a group stage match of 2016 Kazakhstan President Cup against Kazakhstan U17 after coming on as a substitute at last minutes in place of Ilia Sinani.
