= Elmir Lekaj =

Albanian footballer

Personal information
- Date of birth: 18 January 2000 (age 26)
- Place of birth: Shkodër, Albania
- Height: 1.83 m (6 ft 0 in)
- Position: Defender

Youth career
- 2012–2018: Vllaznia

Senior career*
Years	Team	Apps	(Gls)
2018–2021	Vllaznia	9	(0)
2021	Arbëria	11	(0)
2021–2022	Rabat Ajax	11	(2)
2022	Ulpiana	8	(1)
2022–2023	Dolny Kubin	9	(1)

International career
2016	Albania U17	8	(0)
2018	Albania U19	3	(0)
2019	Albania U20	2	(0)
2021	Albania U21	1	(0)
- * Club domestic league appearances and goals

Elmir Lekaj (born 18 January 2000) is an Albanian footballer who plays as a defender for Dolny Kubin.

== Career ==
=== Vllaznia ===
After spending several years in the club's youth system, Lekaj signed with the first team in April 2018. He made his debut in official competition for the club on 24 August 2019, coming on as a 77th-minute substitute for Arsid Kruja in a 1–0 home victory over Laçi.

=== Arbëria ===
In December 2020, Lekaj moved to Kosovan club Arbëria.

=== Rabat Ajax ===
In June 2021, Lekaj Signs in Malta for Rabat Ajax.

=== KF Ulpiana ===
In January 2022 Lekaj signs for Kosovan Team Ulpiana.

=== MFK Dolny Kubin ===
In June 2023 Lekaj Sign for the Slovak Team Dolny Kubin.

== Honours ==
=== Player ===
Vllaznia

- Albanian Cup: 2020–21
