= Dominik Ivkič =

Slovenian footballer

Personal information
- Date of birth: 31 July 1997 (age 29)
- Place of birth: Ljubljana, Slovenia
- Height: 1.90 m (6 ft 3 in)
- Position: Defender

Team information
- Current team: Brinje Grosuplje
- Number: 72

Youth career
- –2013: Interblock
- 2013–2014: Ilirija 1911
- 2014–2016: Domžale

Senior career*
Years	Team	Apps	(Gls)
2013–2014	Ilirija	2	(0)
2016–2017	Domžale	1	(0)
2017	→ Zarica Kranj (loan)	7	(0)
2017	→ Radomlje (loan)	9	(0)
2018	Brinje Grosuplje	11	(1)
2018–2020	Fužinar	41	(2)
2020	Tallinna Kalev	14	(0)
2021	Hrvatski Dragovoljac	18	(2)
2022	Sesvete	8	(1)
2022–2023	Ilirija	28	(4)
2023–2024	Fushë Kosova	28	(4)
2024–2025	Koper	22	(0)
2026	Septemvri Sofia	18	(1)
2026–	Brinje Grosuplje	6	(0)

International career
2012–2013	Slovenia U16	12	(1)
2014	Slovenia U18	4	(0)
2014–2016	Slovenia U19	23	(2)
- * Club domestic league appearances and goals as of 16 October 2026

Dominik Ivkič (born 31 July 1997) is a Slovenian professional footballer who plays as a defender for Slovenian PrvaLiga club Brinje Grosuplje.

== Club career ==
He made his professional debut in the Slovenian PrvaLiga for Domžale on 21 May 2016 in a game against Krško. In January 2026, Ivkič put pen to paper on a deal with Bulgarian team Septemvri Sofia.
