= Siyabonga Dube =

South African soccer player

Personal information
- Date of birth: 12 October 1995 (age 31)
- Place of birth: Durban, South Africa
- Height: 1.70 m (5 ft 7 in)
- Position: Defender

Team information
- Current team: Richards Bay F.C.
- Number: 14

Senior career*
Years	Team	Apps	(Gls)
2014–2022	Lamontville Golden Arrows	117	(1)
2023–24	Liria	16	(0)
2024-	Richards Bay F.C.	7	(0)
- * Club domestic league appearances and goals as of 8/6/25 @ 14:41(AEST)

Siyabonga Dube (born 12 October 1995) is a South African soccer player who played as a defender for Football Superleague of Kosovo side Liria.
