= Arbër Basha =

Albanian footballer

Personal information
- Date of birth: 13 January 1998 (age 28)
- Place of birth: Tirana, Albania
- Height: 1.83 m (6 ft 0 in)
- Position: Midfielder

Team information
- Current team: Liria Prizren
- Number: 10

Youth career
- 2012–2016: Olimpic
- 2016–2017: Akademia e Futbollit

Senior career*
Years	Team	Apps	(Gls)
2017–2018	Vllaznia Pozheran	2	(0)
2018	Kamza	0	(0)
2018–2019	Narva Trans	12	(0)
2019–2022	Kastrioti	57	(3)
2022–2024	Kukësi	9	(0)
2024–	Liria Prizren	13	(1)
- * Club domestic league appearances and goals as of 15 June 2024

Arbër Basha (born 13 January 1998) is an Albanian footballer who plays as a midfielder for Liria Prizren in Kosovo.

== Career ==
=== Narva Trans ===
Basha began his professional career in Kosovo, spending time in the youth ranks at Vllaznia before returning to his native Albania with Kamza, albeit making no first-team appearances. In June 2018, Basha moved to Estonian club Narva Trans. Basha's goal was to use the move to prompt an eventual transfer to the Russian Premier League. He made his competitive debut for the club on 12 July 2018 in a UEFA Europa League tie against Željezničar; a 2–0 defeat. He scored his first goal for the club in August of that year, the fifth in a 7–0 victory over SK Kadrina.

=== Kastrioti ===
In August 2019, Basha returned to Albania, joining then-Albanian First Division club Kastrioti. He made his competitive debut for the club on 14 September 2019 in a 3–2 victory over Egnatia.

== International career ==
In October 2018, Basha was called up to the Albania U21 team.
