= Skender Loshi =

Albanian footballer

Personal information
- Date of birth: 12 February 1999 (age 27)
- Place of birth: Breda, Netherlands
- Height: 1.81 m (5 ft 11 in)
- Position: Forward

Team information
- Current team: Baronie
- Number: 19

Youth career
- –2009: Baronie
- 2009–2019: NAC Breda

Senior career*
Years	Team	Apps	(Gls)
2019–2020	TEC	1	(0)
2020	Feronikeli	0	(0)
2020–2021	Stomil Olsztyn	12	(1)
2021–2022	San Ġwann	10	(3)
2022	ASWH	14	(1)
2022–2023	Dessel Sport	19	(3)
2023	SteDoCo	0	(0)
2023–	Baronie	16	(5)
- * Club domestic league appearances and goals as of 12 February 2024

Skender Loshi (born 12 February 1999) is a professional footballer, who plays as a forward for Baronie. Born in Netherlands, he has chosen to represent Albania at the international level.

== Club career ==
=== 2019–2021: SV TEC, Feronikeli and Stomil Olsztyn ===
On 3 December 2019, Loshi signed a six-month contract with Tweede Divisie club SV TEC and received squad number 24. On 11 January 2020, he made his debut in a 2–2 away draw against ASWH after being named in the starting line-up. He was not fielded again. Seventeen days after debut, SV TEC through a communiqué stated that after a mutual agreement they decided to end the cooperation.

On 29 January 2020, Loshi and his brother Simon joined with Football Superleague of Kosovo club Feronikeli, and received squad number 19. He did not play any games at Feronikeli.

On 22 February 2020, Loshi signed a one-season contract with Polish I liga club Stomil Olsztyn and received squad number 19. On 11 July 2020, he made his debut in a 1–2 home defeat against Miedź Legnica after coming on as a substitute at 82nd minute in place of Sam van Huffel.

=== 2021–2022: San Ġwann and ASWH ===
On 11 September 2021, Loshi made his debut with Maltese Challenge League club San Ġwann against St. George's after being named in the starting line-up and scored his side's two goals during a 4–0 home win. Five days after debut, he officially joined the club.

On 7 February 2022, Loshi and his brother Simon joined the Dutch Tweede Divisie side ASWH. Five days later, he made his ASWH debut in his team's 3–1 home win against GVVV. After being named in the starting line-up, fourteen minutes into the game, he made an assist for Daniël Wissel's first of three goals. On 5 March 2022, Loshi scored for the first and last time for ASWH, in the 69th minute against Jong Sparta in an away game that ASWH won 1–2. Before the season ended, the Loshis and ASWH separated.

=== Since 2022: Dessel, Stedoco and Baronie ===
In the season of 2022–23, Skender Loshi played at Dessel in Belgium.

Next season, Loshi continued to SteDoCo and was let go before the season started. Instead, he started the new season at his youth club Baronie.

== International career ==
On 9 November 2018, Loshi received a call-up from Albania U21 for the friendly matches against Malta U21. He was an unused substitute in those matches.
