= Panorama Sport =

Albanian newspaper devoted to sports

- Language: Albanian
- Website: www.panorama-sport.com

Panorama Sport is a newspaper published in Albania.
