= Adem Maliqi =

Kosovar professional footballer (born 1997)

Personal information
- Full name: Adem Maliqi
- Date of birth: 17 July 1997 (age 29)
- Place of birth: Batllavë, FR Yugoslavia
- Height: 1.83 m (6 ft 0 in)
- Position: Left winger

Team information
- Current team: Trepça '89
- Number: 14

Senior career*
Years	Team	Apps	(Gls)
2018	Ferizaj	0	(0)
2018–2020	Flamurtari	30	(3)
2020–2021	Feronikeli	39	(4)
2021–2023	Llapi	60	(3)
2023	Malisheva	4	(1)
2023–2024	Feronikeli	3	(0)
2024–	Llapi	11	(1)
2024–2025	Suhareka	21	(1)
2025–	Trepça '89	0	(0)
- * Club domestic league appearances and goals as of 13 June 2025

Adem Maliqi (born 17 July 1997) is a Kosovar professional footballer who plays as a left-winger for Kosovo Superleague club Trepça '89.

== Club career ==
Maliqi started his career at 2 Korriku. He played with Ferizaj in the Kosovo Superleague debut season 2018. Maliqi was transferred to Flamurtari in the summer of 2018. He debuted in the Super League of Kosovo two week game, his opponent was Drita and win away 1:3. He stayed two years in Kosovo Superleague. Maliqi to Feronikeli 2020; he played the first match against Gjilani in Kosovo Superleague and stay one year. He was transferred to the Kosovo team Llapi in July 2021, where he stayed for two years. Maliqi moved to Malisheva on 21 February 2023 and made his debut in the first match against with Ferizaj in 1:1 draw.

== Honours ==
Llapi

- Kosovar Cup: 2021–22
- Kosovar Supercup: 2022
