= Eglentin Gjoni =

Albanian footballer

Personal information
- Date of birth: 2 December 1992 (age 33)
- Place of birth: Vorë, Albania
- Height: 1.94 m (6 ft 4 in)
- Position: Defender

Team information
- Current team: Shkumbini Peqin

Senior career*
Years	Team	Apps	(Gls)
2012	Vora		
2012	FK Farka		
2013–2015	Partizani B		
2015	Kamza	21	(1)
2016–2020	Laçi	128	(5)
2020–2021	Llapi	1	(0)
2021	Drenica	15	(2)
2021–2022	Ulpiana	13	(0)
2022	Labëria		
2022–2024	Vora		
2024–	Shkumbini Peqin		

International career^{‡}
2010	Albania U18	2	(0)
- * Club domestic league appearances and goals as of 11 December 2021 ‡ National team caps and goals as of 10 May 2010

Eglentin Gjoni (born 2 December 1992) is an Albanian footballer who plays for Shkumbini Peqin.

== Club career ==
=== Kamza ===
In January 2015, Gjoni moved to then Albanian First Division club FC Kamza. He made his league debut for the club on 7 February 2015 in a 1–0 home victory over Besa Kavajë. He played all ninety minutes of the match. He scored his first league goal for the club on 31 October 2015 in a 3–0 away victory over Ada Velipojë. His goal, the first of the match, came in the 47th minute.
