= Erlis Frashëri =

Albanian footballer

Personal information
- Date of birth: 13 May 1988 (age 38)
- Place of birth: Korçë, Albania
- Height: 1.77 m (5 ft 10 in)
- Position: Midfielder

Team information
- Current team: Flamurtari

Youth career
- 2003–2008: Skënderbeu

Senior career*
Years	Team	Apps	(Gls)
2008–2009	Skënderbeu	27	(2)
2010–2011	Teuta Durrës	36	(7)
2011–2012	Besa Kavajë	11	(1)
2012–2013	Tomori	9	(1)
2013	Partizani Tirana	5	(0)
2013–2014	Himara	1	(0)
2014–2015	Luftëtari	23	(7)
2015–2016	Korabi	24	(0)
2016–2018	Kamza	72	(0)
2019	Teuta Durrës	5	(0)
2019–2021	Gjilani	36	(0)
2021	Drenica	13	(0)
2022–2024	Skënderbeu	62	(1)
2024	Flamurtari	15	(1)
2025	Besa Kavajë	6	(0)
- * Club domestic league appearances and goals

Erlis Frashëri (born 13 May 1988) is an Albanian footballer who plays as a defender for Flamurtari.

== Honours ==
Skënderbeu

- Kategoria e Parë: 2022–23
