= Valdo Zeqaj =

Albanian footballer

Personal information
- Full name: Valdo Zeqaj
- Date of birth: 24 August 1995 (age 31)
- Place of birth: Vlorë, Albania
- Height: 1.88 m (6 ft 2 in)
- Position: Centre back

Team information
- Current team: Flamurtari Prishtina

Youth career
- 2011–2014: Flamurtari Vlorë

Senior career*
Years	Team	Apps	(Gls)
2013–2014	Flamurtari Vlorë	0	(0)
2014	Besa	5	(0)
2015–2016	Flamurtari Vlorë	13	(0)
2016	→ Sopoti (loan)	13	(0)
2016–2017	Apolonia	23	(0)
2017–2018	Luftëtari	11	(0)
2018	Flamurtari Prishtina		
2018-2019	Vllaznia	25	(2)
2019	Flamurtari Vlorë	11	(0)
2020–	Flamurtari Prishtina	12	(1)

International career
2013	Albania U-19	1	(0)
- * Club domestic league appearances and goals

Valdo Zeqaj (born 24 August 1994 in Vlorë) is an Albanian football player who plays as a defender for Flamurtari Prishtina.

== Club career ==
He joined Besa Kavajë after coming from the KS Flamurtari Vlorë academy.
