= Dobrajë e Madhe =

Dobrajë e Madhe: Dobrajë e Madhe (Albanian); Велика Добрања/Velika Dobranja (Serbian)
- Village
- Location within Kosovo
- Coordinates: 42.542444°N 21.046114°E
- Location: Kosovo
- District: Prishtina
- Municipality: Lipjan

Population (2024)
  - Total: 1,751
- Time zone: UTC+1 (CET)
  - Summer (DST): UTC+2 (CEST)

Dobrajë e Madhe (Albanian: Dobrajë e Madhe, Serbian Cyrillic: Велика Добрања/Velika Dobranja) is a village in Lipjan municipality in Kosovo. Dobrajë has seen a big improvement in infrastructure and quality of life in the past decade, with having the road fixed and asphalted, having lights that cover a big part of the village during the night. The villagers have also opened a variety of businesses like a big grocery store, a bakery, a few barber shops, hair salons and more. Dobrajë has also a big wedding venue called "Dielli" for the villagers to hold their festive ceremonies.

== History ==
The village of Dobraje e Madhe was founded by Albanian refugees from Kuršumlija in 1878.

== Notable people ==
- Edon Zhegrova, footballer currently at Juventus.
