= Marclei Santos =

Brazilian footballer

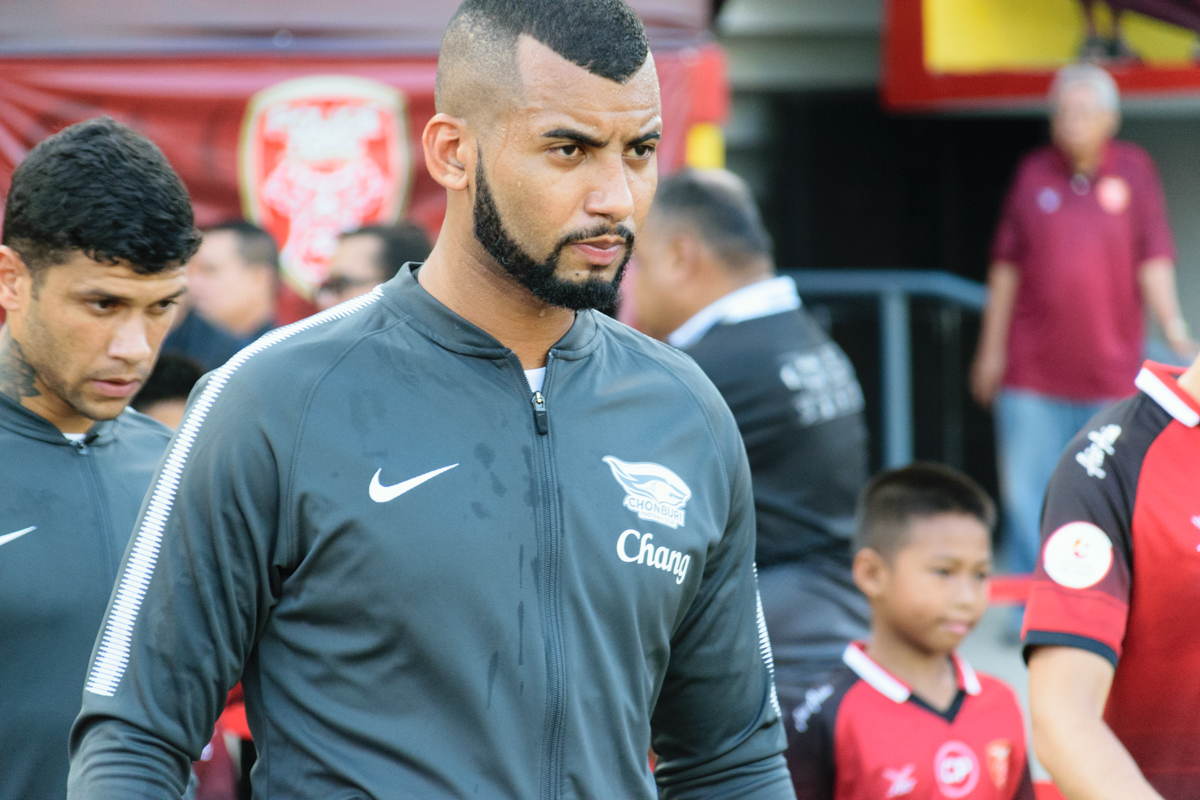

Personal information
- Full name: Marclei César Chaves Santos
- Date of birth: 18 June 1989 (age 37)
- Place of birth: Alagoinhas, Brazil
- Height: 1.85 m (6 ft 1 in)
- Position: Forward

Team information
- Current team: Dukagjini
- Number: 9

Youth career
- Vitória

Senior career*
Years	Team	Apps	(Gls)
2008–2010	Votoraty		
2009	→ Santa Helena (loan)		
2010	→ Sagrada Esperança (loan)		
2011	Vitória	1	(0)
2011	Boa Esporte	8	(0)
2012	Sergipe		
2013	Mixto		
2013	CEOV		
2013	Anápolis	29	(0)
2013	União Rondonópolis		
2014	Ríver	16	(6)
2014	Inhumas		
2015	Jacuipense	7	(1)
2015	CEOV	2	(0)
2016–2017	Bahia de Feira	16	(10)
2017	Mitra Kukar	32	(24)
2018	Chonburi	12	(3)
2018	Ho Chi Minh City	6	(2)
2019	Al-Salmiya		
2020	Bahia de Feira	0	(0)
2020	Feronikeli	6	(3)
2021	Arbëria	15	(9)
2021–2022	Ulpiana	20	(6)
2022	Prishtina	11	(0)
2023–	Dukagjini	19	(5)
- * Club domestic league appearances and goals as of 1 October 2023

Marclei César Chaves Santos (born 18 June 1989), is a Brazilian professional footballer who plays as a forward for Football Superleague of Kosovo club Dukagjini.

== Career ==
Marclei started his professionally career in the Campeonato Brasileiro Série B in 2011 where he played for Boa.

=== Mitra Kukar ===
Previously, Marclei played for the Brazilian club side Bahia de Feira. His contract with the club actually only ends in May 2017. But because of the offer from Indonesian club side Mitra Kukar, he immediately ended his contract with Bahia de Feira as of 10 April 2017.

=== Al-Salmiya SC ===
On 2 February 2019, Marclei confirmed on his Instagram profile, that he had joined Al-Salmiya.

=== FC Feronikeli 74 ===
After a brief return to Bahia de Feira, Marclei moved to Kosovan club Feronikeli in August 2020.

=== FC Prishtina ===
Santos moved to most famous Kosovan club Prishtina in July 2022.

== Honours ==
Boa Esporte

- Campeonato Mineiro Módulo II: 2011

Mixto

- Campeonato Mato-Grossense runner-up: 2013

Ríver

- Campeonato Piauiense: 2014
