= Banja of Peja =

Township in Istog, Kosovo

Coordinates: 42.7269°N 20.3914°E

Banja of Peja Banja e Pejës Пећка Бања
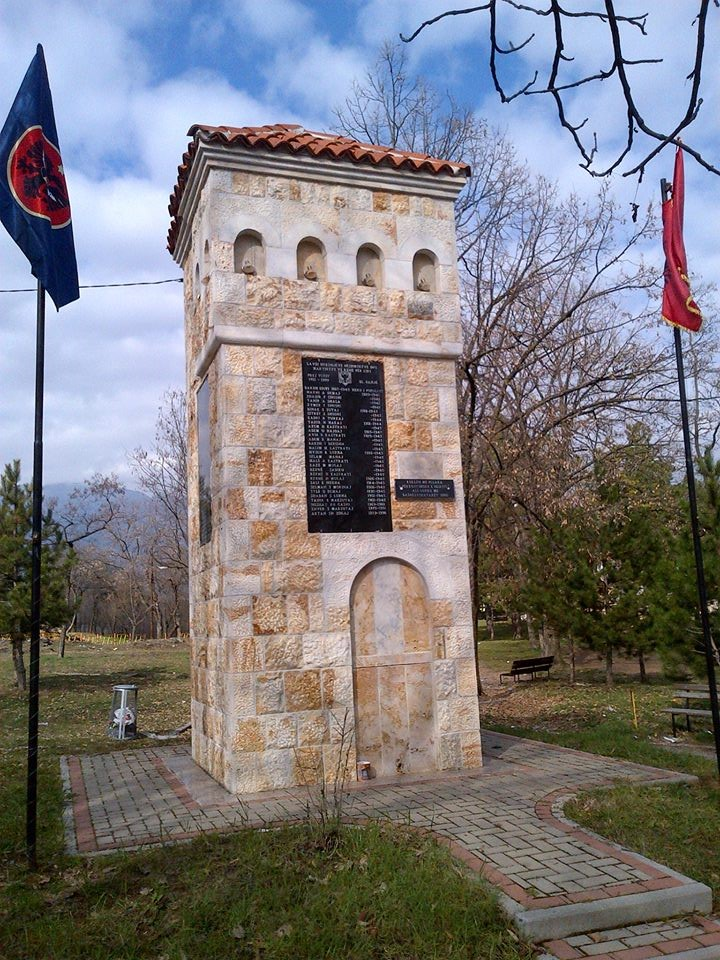
- This monument is built in Banja of Peja. It's about Banja's heroes, during the wars, from World War Two
- Interactive map of Banja of Peja
- Country: Kosovo
- District: Peja
- Municipality: Istog
- Postal code: Banja of Peja 31010

Banja of Peja (Albanian: Banja e Pejës, Serbian Cyrillic: Пећка Бања) is a township located in the municipality of Istog, Kosovo. To many people it is known by the name Ilixhe. It is a tourist health center with services in Istog and in the region, offering quality for inhabitation, highly developed infrastructure and services.

== Location ==
Banja of Peja is a village in the Dukagjini plain, in the municipality of Istok. It shares its borders with the local community Vrellë in north, with the local community Dobrushë in southeast and municipality of Peja in southwest. It is located 80 km away from Pristina and 12 km away from Peja. Nearby flows the White Drin river and Lumbardhi i Pejës river. Banja of Peja sits 520m above sea level.

=== Geographic location ===
Banja of Peja is located in the north geographic width between 42°41’ and 42°45’, and in the east of Greenwich meridian between 18°0’ and 18°6’, in about 520m above sea level. It is located not too far from the radius of Rugova ridges by getting the southwest position related to Mokna and Currova, and the south one with Accursed Mountains, Korenica and Sejnova, as well as the southeastern one related to Zhleb and Ruselina. Through the Rugova ridge and the edge of Cakorri, Banja of Peja is connected to Plav and Gusinje, ending up to Montenegro.

=== Climate ===
Based on the sea levels, its landscape and geographical location, Banja of Peja is characterized with medium continental climate. It has short winters, relatively cool and with much precipitation, whereas summers are hot, long, and quite humid. From all the climate elements, the air temperature affects the quantity of tourists most. The air temperature determines the length and quality of the tourist seasons; both winter and summer. The direction, density and the speed of wind affect the general climate in Banja of Peja, as well as most of the trends in tourism. Rainfall presents a motivating and determinate factor of these trends. Their character and distribution control the health-medical function and the recreational manifestation of the Bath and the entire tourist region of Dukagjini plain.

== History ==
The curing properties of this bath have also been used by the Illyrians. This is shown by the archaeological relics found in Kosovo. In addition there were also discoveries of different baths and various water pipes constructed by the Illyrians. In the main water source, there are natural stone pools which have been used by Ancient Illyrians.

=== Archaeology ===
The archaeological history of Banja of Peja has started in 1974, through the discovery of some archaeological relics while building the hotel. A typical helmet of the Illyrian army was found. In the same year, more digging processes seeking new findings were made, resulting in two graves of a famous couple, which today is named as the royal grave. The grave had a rectangle constructed base covered with stones probably taken nearby. One of the graves was documented with worthy inventory such as needles in omega form, rings and jewelry made of bronze and silver and that led to assumption that it was the grave of the female. The other grave that belonged to the male had guns, plates made of silver and bronze and a ring. This wealthy archaeological inventory belongs to the late Iron Age, the 6th or 4th century BC.

==== Unregistered archaeological sites ====
It has to be emphasized that, except the above-mentioned locations, there is also data found for another archaeological location close to nowadays primary school in Bath, found in the General Urbanistic Plan 1997. This location is assumed to belong to the Iron Age. Moreover, there is data from the inhabitants for the existence of a ceramic tube from the center of Corrolluke village in the southeast direction until the highway Peja – Mitrovica. In this same area, while building gas stations, were found other archaeological materials.

== Economy ==
16% of the income of inhabitants is derived from the public sector, 25% from the private sector, 22% from retirement funds, 5% from the social assistance, 3% from agriculture, and 1% from renting out their properties. An interesting fact is that about 28% of the population provides living from remittances – the money their relatives send from foreign countries. From the employed population, 35% are employed in Bath, 15% are employed in Istok, and 17% travel to Peja to sell goods. 6% of the Banja of Peja population works in Pristina, 4% are employed within different parts of Istok, 1% in different cities, and 22% are employed abroad.

=== Economic and producing objects ===
According to the director of economic development of Istok, there are 192 economic subjects in Bath.

=== Demographics ===
Historical evolution of the population in the locality
Years	1948	1953	1961	1971	1981	1991	2011
Population	158	139	243	374	1168	2126	1360

== Tourism ==
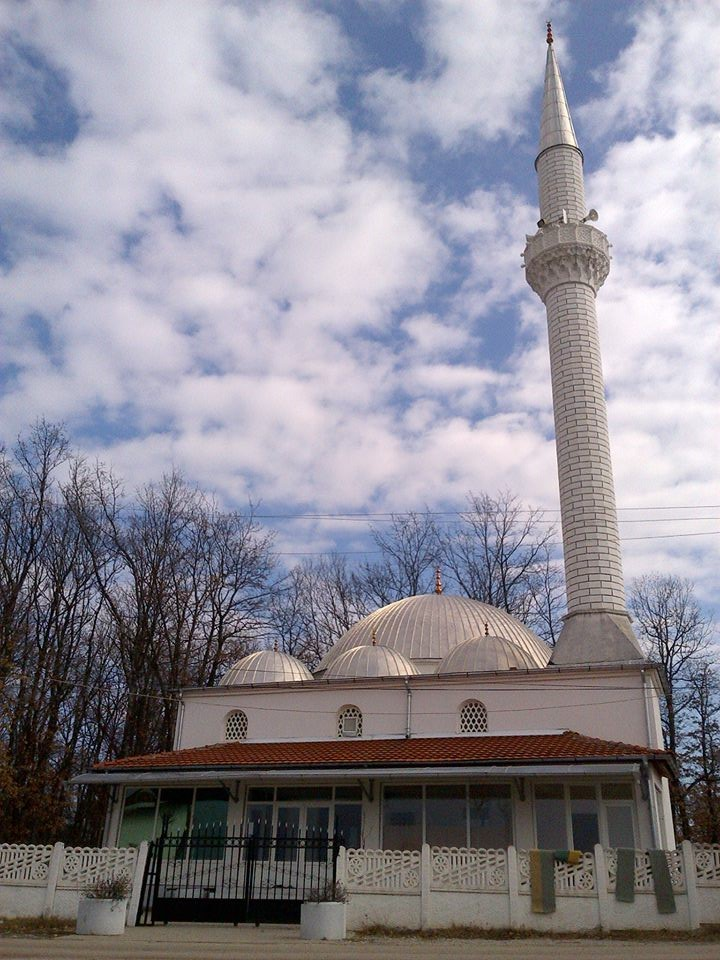
Mosque Ilixhe

The main orientation towards economic development of Banja of Peja is health tourism indeed.

Dating from Illyrio-Dardanians times, tourism in the spa of Peja was a developed one, therefore water springs were used by many people of that time to cure different illnesses that came from other places. Even nowadays, these water springs are used for the same purpose. The difference today is that now we have a much better tourist infrastructure which is now in all corners of Kosovo and further. Part of tourism is the mosque, church and the park. The mosque is located by the end of the main road (center of this town). The park is located in the left side of the center, which is a forest filled with trees. Within this forest is ‘hidden” the small house of stone which has the thermal source.

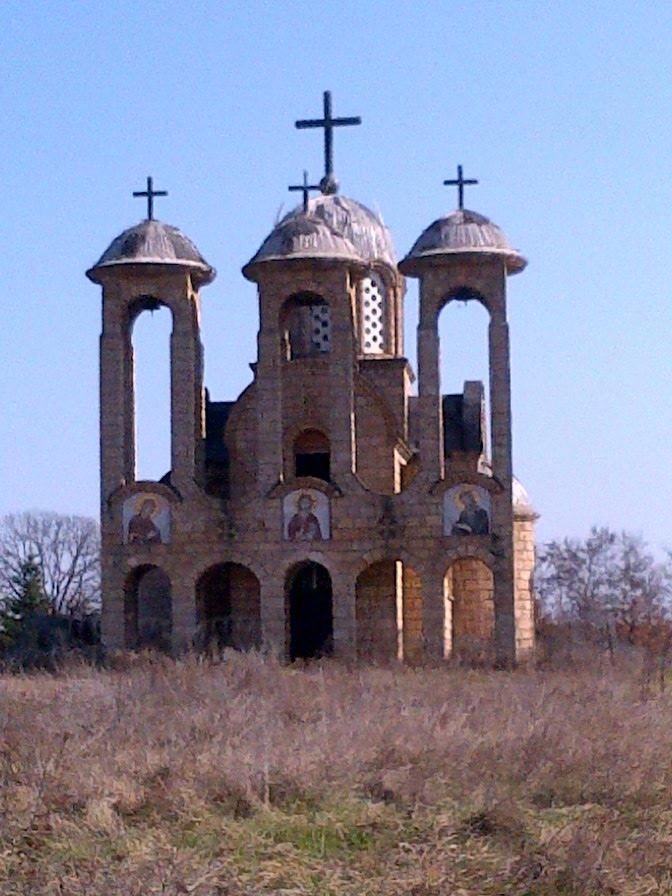
Church of St. John the Baptist

The tourist attractions located close to Banja of Peja are: Rugova, the legacy of Peja and Deçan, the fount of Drin, Istok, Vrelo, the mountains around, etc.

=== Warm water and medical implications ===
Based on the data until 1959 in Banja of Peja were many sources of thermo mineral waters on the temperature of 23–48 degrees Celsius that formed calcareous flows up to 1 kilometer. The amount of water and chemicals can be concluded to be split in three flows for carrying thermo mineral waters. The high pressure of gases prevented this flow from puncturing which caused to become the source of thermo mineral water, and during the flow were formed layers of Calcium carbonate. From the flow of water many onix and bigra limestones, which are still created. These diggings were made by experts from Belgrade and Skopje, till the depth of 9m (meters). The more layers of onix and bigra limestones were formed, the smaller was the amount of water that flowed. The close of this canal caused the forming of two smaller sources close to it. When the plastic tubes were put for water transportation, the water amount was calculated and was 18 liters per second.

=== The chemical composition of thermo mineral waters ===
The latest chemical analysis of thermo mineral wares have been done in several occasions and have given these results:

1. The chemical amount in the thermo mineral waters consists of qualitative Hydrocarbon, Sodium, Calcium and Magnesium groups (HCO3-Na-Ca-Mg)
2. The waters have minerals from 2.04 g/L, pH-6.8

According to research made in 2013 in Banja of Peja, these results were obtained:

The composition of chemical elements in thermal water of Banja of Peja (Lukovic 1962)
Elements	Content (g / l)
Sodium (Na)	0.0429
Calcium (Ca)	0.2748
Kalium (K)	0.0099
Magnesium (Mg)	0.1200
Bicarbonate (HSO_{3})	1.5329
Sulfate (SO_{4})	0.0060
Chlorine (Cl)	0.0174
Water Temperature	47,5 Degrees Celsius (°C)

The composition of chemical elements in thermal water of Banja of Peja (D.Protic 1995)
Elements	Content (mg / l)	Elements	Content (mg / l)
Carbon trioxide (CO_{3})	0	Strontium (Sr)	1.20
Bicarbonate (HCO_{3})	1420.0	Barium (Ba)	0.12
Chlorine (Cl)	52.0	Lithium (Li)	0.10
Sulfate (SO_{4})	10.0	Rubidium (Rb)	0.040
Fluorine (F)	0.6	Arsenic (As)	0.025
Bromine (Br)	0.15	Lead (Pb)	0.020
Iodine (I)	0.07	Manganese (Mn)	0.020
Hydrogen phosphate (HPO_{4})	0.10	Nickel (Ni)	0.010
Hydrogenarsenate (HAsO_{4})	0.05	Copper (Cu)	0.010
Sodium (Na)	252.0	Zinc (Zn)	0.009
Potassium (K)	5.0	Caesium (Cs)	0.008
Calcium (Ca)	145.0	Chromium (Cr)	0.007
Magnesium (Mg)	86.0	Cobalt (Co)	0.005
Ammonium (NH_{4})	0.3	Titanium (Ti)	0.005
Iron oxide (Fe_{2}O_{3})	1.20	Molybdenum (Mo)	0.003
Aluminium oxide (Al_{2}O_{3})	4.48	Cadmium (Cd)	0.0006
Oxoborinic acid (HBO_{2})	3.0	Silver (Ag)	0.0003
Silicon dioxide (SiO_{2})	60.0	Arsenic (As)	0.0002

Carbon dioxide (CO_{2}) dominates in the mineral water. It has Hydrogen sulfide (H_{2}S) and some of the radioactive gas (Rn). From the radioactive elements the amount of Radon has increased (Ra=0.37 mg/L), while the amount of Uranium has decreased (U=0.0008 mg/L), and the amount of the gas of Radon has decreased too (Rn=8.5 mg/L).

=== Healing effects of thermo mineral water ===
According to previously done reports is concluded that thermo mineral water of Banja of Peja has healing effects. Reactions toward thermo mineral water can be used by drinking it, staying in the pools filled with it, and it claimed that it heals these illnesses:

- Rheumatic illnesses (ex. arthritis)
- Ulcers
- Nerve breakdown
- Injuries in muscles and bones
- Wounds
- Gynecological illnesses
- Skin illnesses

=== The layer composition of onix limestone ===
Bigar and onix limestones are products formed by thermo mineral water.

== Facts for visitors ==
The canal that transmits the water in the rehab center has erupted, thus passerby people take off their shoes and put their feet in the hot water. The Bath, except healing importance, is an occurrence with scientific, aesthetic and educative values.

== Urban planning ==
Even though Banja of Peja is a small township, it has a well developed urban plan. It possesses office for services, canalization, water supply, post offices, kindergartens, primary schools, shops, restaurants, parks, hotels etc.

=== Services ===
There is the functional office of the local community open for inhabitants and located where the ambulance used to be. Today the ambulance is located close to ”Oniks” Hotel.

=== Education ===
In the Bath functions one kindergarten, which is through the stationary for physical medicine ”Termal”. The primary school ”Trepca” in Banja of Peja is located in the central zone of the habitat. It serves the whole local community. This school consists of 782 pupils of Albanian and Bosnian nationality. Out of them, 7 pupils are in special education and 43 belong to pre-education. The school has a staff of 49 employees. It is provided with its own library. The parcel of the school has a surface of 2 ha, which includes a small football and basketball court. Most of the inhabitants the school serves are in maximum distance of 800m (metres) from the school.

=== Healthcare ===
There is one Healthcare building which has employed 13 employees: 2 doctors, 1 dentist, 8 nurses, 1 cleaner and one employee for general maintenance. According to private centers for emergency, there is no ambulance that deals with primary care. There are some private dentist offices, and two private specialistic ambulances only.

=== Culture ===
The library of the city is located in the building of the old school. It functions only during the summer. However, there is a cinema within ”Onix” hotel which has 200 seats but for the moment is out of function.

=== Religion and cemetery ===
In the beginning of the road to Orroberde, recently has been built a mosque that serves the needs of Banja inhabitants. There is the Muslim cemetery quite close from the mosque. In the other hand, because of the political strategy of the last invaders, an orthodox Serbian church was built, which has the Orthodox cemetery.

=== Hotels ===
In Banja of Peja, except the public and private hotelier infrastructure that partly functions, there are many private houses and rooms that are available for rent. Most of the time, the second option fits best to the requirements of the tourists.

=== Road infrastructure ===
The habitat in Banja of Peja is not close to the highways or railroad, but it slightly connects from the highway R-101 (from Mitrovica to Peja), and the regional road that passes through the habitat connects Istog with Mitrovica and Peja (i.e. the most important chain of Kosovo and region's traffic). The best connection of railway from Pećka Banja is through the railways of Peja.

=== The telecommunications network ===
In Banja of Peja is located one post office that is the property of Post and Telecom of Kosovo (PTK). It has the digital telephonic central with up to 730 numbers. About 380 numbers are used at the moment. Post and Telecom of Kosovo (PTK) spreads the internet signal through the telephonic lines. The best existing opportunity is the underground network for telephone and internet.

=== Water supply ===
The inhabitants are supplied with water from White Drin river.

=== Canalization ===
The project of the fecal canalization system has predicted to include the entire area of the Bath. In 2009 was built only the first phase of this system which includes only 30% of the habitat.

=== Development objectives ===
Banja of Peja can develop only through the following way of developments:

1. Developing the infrastructure
2. Improving the existing services and offering needed services
3. Increasing the opportunities for employment
4. Improving the tourist preparations
5. Protecting the ecologic stability, biodiversity and special natural assets
6. Decreasing the air population.

Except the healing aspect, thermal waters of Kosovo can be used to produce thermal energy, but until now there is no detailed research to analyse the producing potential of these waters.

== Most important facts ==
Banja is proposed to be included in the list of cultural monuments in Kosovo.

== Gallery ==
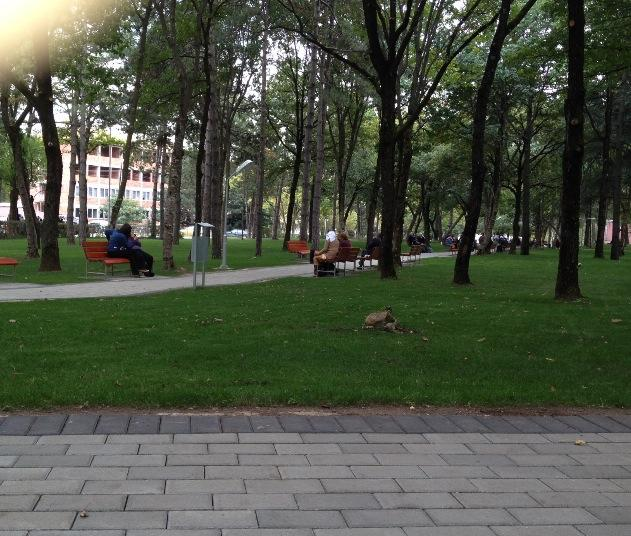

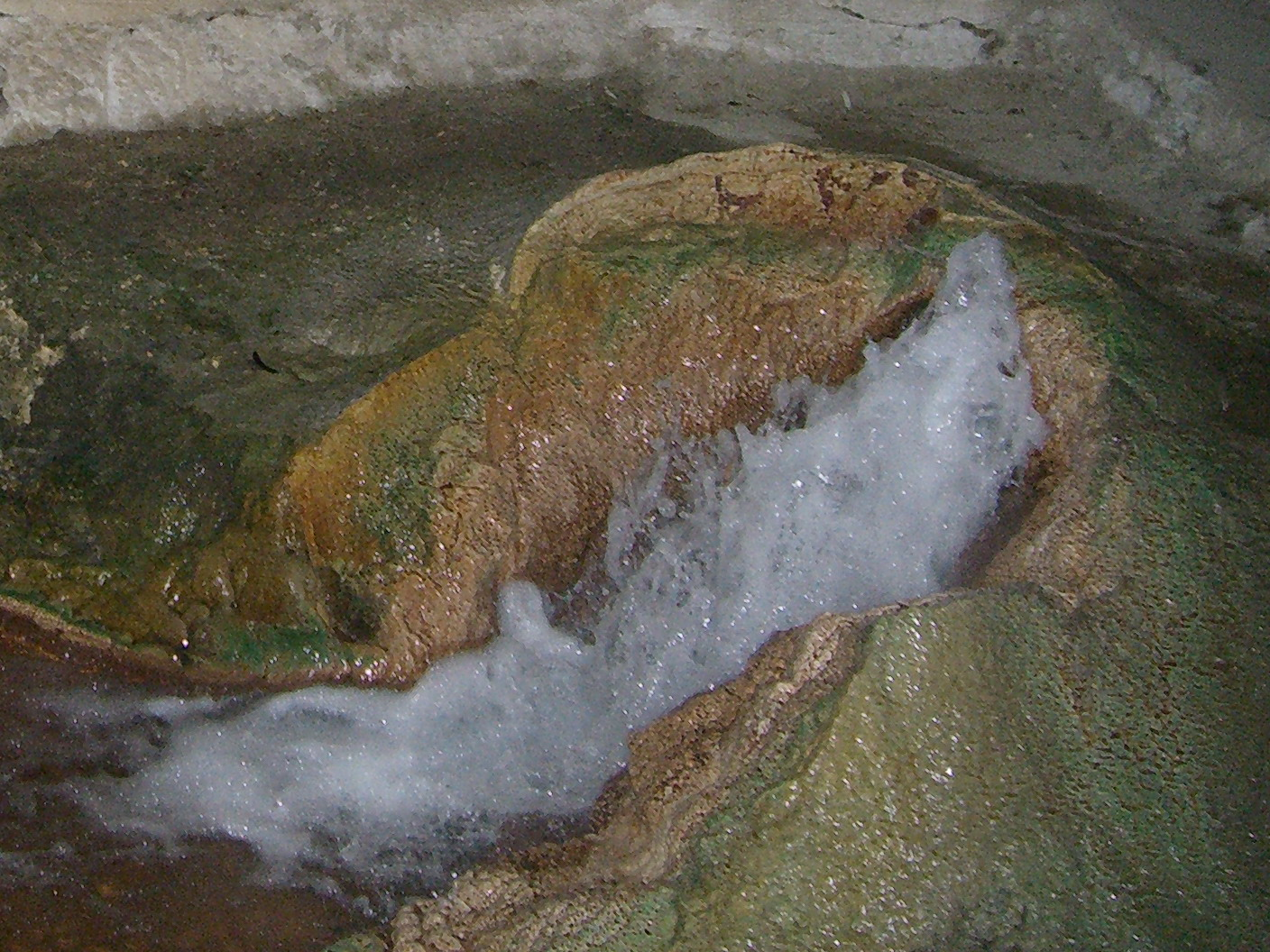
