= KF A&N =

Football club in Kosovo

- Full name: Klub Futbollistik A&N
- Founded: 2017; 9 years ago
- Dissolved: 18 June 2023, merged with FC Suhareka
- Ground: Boka-Boka Studium, Korishë
- Capacity: 1,500
- League: None
- 2022–23 (last): Kosovo First League – Group A, 9th of 10

KF A&N (Albanian: Klubi Futbollistik A&N) was a football club from Kosovo, who competed last time in the Kosovo First League. The club was based in Korishë and their home ground was the Boka-Boka Studium, which was a seating capacity of 1,500. The club dissolved in the 18th of June 2023, after merging to form FC Suhareka.

== Players ==
=== Last squad ===
Note: Flags indicate national team as defined under FIFA eligibility rules; some limited exceptions apply. Players may hold more than one non-FIFA nationality.

No.	Pos.	Nation	Player
1	GK	KOS	Egzon Lekaj
2	DF	KOS	Art Maloku
3	DF	ENG	Dion Miftari (on loan from Llapi)
5	DF	ALB	Valdo Zeqaj
6	DF	KOS	Altin Sylejmani (captain)
7	MF	BRA	Daniel Gonçalves Batista
8	MF	KOS	Lekë Pozhegu
11	FW	KOS	Albin Shabani
12	GK	KOS	Florent Morina
13	DF	KOS	Arvanit Morina

No.	Pos.	Nation	Player
14	MF	KOS	Taulant Kicmari
18	FW	CIV	Noumoufa Diarra
19	FW	ALB	Ardit Jaupaj
20	MF	KOS	Roni Gashi
21	DF	KOS	Ermir Abazi
22	DF	ALB	Aldo Llambi
23	FW	KOS	Abdyl Vaho
24	MF	ALB	Kevin Myslimi
33	MF	KOS	Argjend Qela
77	FW	KOS	Liburn Shala

== See also ==
- List of football clubs in Kosovo
