= FC Fushë Kosova =

Football club in Kosovo

- Full name: Klubi Futbollistik Fushë Kosova
- Nickname(s): Pampurat
- Founded: 1972; 53 years ago
- Ground: Ekrem Grajqevci
- Capacity: 5,000
- Chairman: Klodian Zeqiri
- Manager: Visar Qarri
- League: Kosovo First League
- 2023–24: Kosovo Superleague, 9th of 10 (relegated)
Home colours	Away colours

FC Fushë Kosova (Albanian: Klubi Futbollistik Fushë Kosova) is a football club based in Kosovo Polje, Kosovo.^{[a]} The club has played in the second division of football in Kosovo, First Football League of Kosovo, during the 2005–06 season. However, they won promotion to the top tier of football in Kosovo, the Football Superleague of Kosovo, for the 2006–07 season.

== Honours ==
(Socialist Federal Republic of Yugoslavia) Kosovo Province League (pre-1991)

- Champions: 1973, 1991

First Football League of Kosovo

- Runners-up (2): 2005–06, 2012–13

== Players ==
=== Current squad ===
As of 1 March 2024

Note: Flags indicate national team as defined under FIFA eligibility rules; some limited exceptions apply. Players may hold more than one non-FIFA nationality.

No.	Pos.	Nation	Player
1	GK	(Italy) ITA	Davide Borsellini
2	DF	(Kosovo) KOS	Bekon Podvorica
4	DF	(Kosovo) KOS	Nasuf Berisha (captain)
5	MF	(Kosovo) KOS	Arbenit Krasniqi
6	DF	(Kosovo) KOS	Bleart Kastrati
7	FW	(Montenegro) MNE	Alden Škrijelj
8	MF	(Kosovo) KOS	Valon Hasani
9	FW	(Montenegro) MNE	Eldin Demiri
10	FW	(Kosovo) KOS	Burim Fejzullahu
11	DF	(Kosovo) KOS	Leutrim Islami
12	GK	(Kosovo) KOS	Lorik Tërnava
14	MF	(Kosovo) KOS	Dorent Hajdari
16	MF	(Kosovo) KOS	Lis Demiri

No.	Pos.	Nation	Player
17	FW	(Hungary) HUN	Sinan Sinanović
18	DF	(Kosovo) KOS	Ardi Ajdini (on loan from Prishtina)
19	FW	(Kosovo) KOS	Almir Azemi
20	MF	(Albania) ALB	Kristi Kote
21	MF	(Kosovo) KOS	Diar Grabanica
22	DF	(Kosovo) KOS	Kastriot Rapuca
24	GK	(Kosovo) KOS	Gentrit Paçarada
27	DF	(Slovenia) SVN	Dominik Ivkič
30	MF	(Montenegro) MNE	Damir Kojašević
32	FW	(Kosovo) KOS	Kadri Berisha
33	DF	(Kosovo) KOS	Leart Prapashtica
34	MF	(Albania) ALB	Drilon Cenaj
77	DF	(Kosovo) KOS	Lirigzon Maloku
