= KF Drenasi =

Football club in Kosovo

- Full name: Klub Futbollistik Drenasi
- Founded: 2000; 25 years ago as Gryka, later as Drenasi (football); September 2023; 1 year ago as futsal club
- Dissolved: 30 June 2023, football club merged with KF Vëllaznimi
- Ground: Rexhep Rexhepi Stadium
- Capacity: 6,000
- League: None
- 2022–23 (last): Kosovo First League – Group A, 8th of 10

KF Drenasi (Albanian: Klubi i Futsallit Drenasi, formerly Klubi Futbollistik Drenasi), is a professional futsal and former football club based in Drenas, Kosovo. The club play in the Futsal Superleague of Kosovo, which is the top tier of futsal in the country.

== Players ==
=== Last football squad ===
Note: Flags indicate national team as defined under FIFA eligibility rules; some limited exceptions apply. Players may hold more than one non-FIFA nationality.

No.	Pos.	Nation	Player
3	MF	(Kosovo) KOS	Endrit Dervishi
5	DF	(Kosovo) KOS	Liridon Elshani
6	DF	(Kosovo) KOS	Leutrim Kadriu
7	MF	(Kosovo) KOS	Lirigzon Xhinovci
8	MF	(Kosovo) KOS	Gentijan Foniqi
9	MF	(Kosovo) KOS	Shpresim Zogu
10	MF	(Kosovo) KOS	Dorent Hajdari
11	DF	(Kosovo) KOS	Ermir Karaxha
12	GK	(Kosovo) KOS	Amrush Bujupi (captain)
14	MF	(Kosovo) KOS	Fitim Ferizi

No.	Pos.	Nation	Player
16	DF	(Kosovo) KOS	Endrit Bytyqi
17	FW	(Kosovo) KOS	Ehat Gjoka
18	FW	(Kosovo) KOS	Florent Jashari
21	MF	(Albania) ALB	Ardit Berisha
25	FW	(Kosovo) KOS	Rinor Hoti
26	MF	(Kosovo) KOS	Valmir Demiri
27	GK	(Kosovo) KOS	Donat Mehmeti
33	DF	(Kosovo) KOS	Debatik Sertolli
77	FW	(Kosovo) KOS	Durim Gashi
99	MF	(Kosovo) KOS	Arbnor Xhekaj

== See also ==
- List of football clubs in Kosovo
