= KF Dardana =

Football club in Kosovo

- Full name: Klub Futbollistik Dardana
- Founded: 1991; 35 years ago
- Dissolved: 2 August 2021, merged with FC Vushtrria
- Ground: Agush Isufi Stadium
- Capacity: 1,000

KF Dardana (Albanian: Klubi Futbollistik Dardana) was a professional football club from Kosovo which last competed in the First League. The club was based in Kamenicë/Dardana. Their home ground was the Agush Isufi Stadium which has a seating capacity of 1,000. The merger of Vushtrria and KF Dardana is called KF Dardana 10. Its full name is Klub Futbollistik Dardana 10.

== List of managers ==
- (Albania) Sadat Pajaziti (16 November 2019 – 1 August 2021)

== See also ==
- List of football clubs in Kosovo
