= KF Arbëria =

Football club in Kosovo

Arbëria
- Full name: Klub Futbollistik Arbëria
- Nickname: Stuhia e Kuqe (Red Storm)
- Founded: 1977; 48 years ago as KF Përparimi; 1997; 28 years ago as KF Arbëria; 30 May 2016; 9 years ago (refounded)
- Ground: Sami Kelmendi Stadium
- President: Jahir Krasniqi
- Manager: Arbnor Morina
- League: Kosovo Second League
- 2024–25: Kosovo Second League, 6th of 16
- Website: http://www.fcarberia.com/

Klub Futbollistik Arbëria, commonly known as Arbëria, is a professional football club based in village Dobrajë e Madhe of Lipjan, Kosovo. The club play in the Football Superleague of Kosovo, which is the second tier of football in the country.

== History ==
=== Early years (1977–1990) ===
In 1977, a group of villagers sent a request to the village council of Dobrajë e Madhe expressing the common will to establish a football club. In June of the same year, some young people from the village before the village council proposed that this team be called KF Përparimi and this team would consist of young people from the village. The team at the first season was led by coach Adem Brestovci and part of the team were Xhelil Gashi (GK), Elhami Llugiqi, Elmi Bublica, Enver Llugiqi, Fatmir Bytyqi, Haki Tafili, Heset Llugiqi, Ismet Uka, Nuhi Bahtiri, Nysret Llugiqi, Qemajl Rexhepi, Sali Nuredini, Skender Gashi, Sylejman Statovci, Shefqet Bahtiri, Shemsi Gashi and Xhevat Berbatovci. Some of the players of this team were guides for many other generations by inspiring many young people in the village over the years to play football and all this unfortunately ended temporarily in the 1990s, where due to the deteriorating situation in Kosovo, the Serbian occupators was stopped all activities (including even sports activities) throughout Kosovo.

=== Returning, extinguish and second returning ===
After seven years break, in 1997, it was again the sports fans of the village of Dobrajë e Madhe brought the club back to functionality, but the club would be called KF Arbëria, in honor of the donor of the club of that time, Nazmi Rrustemi, where one of his businesses bore the same name. From 2003 to 2010 it was part of First Football League of Kosovo, while due to financial conditions in 2010, the team was extinguished.

On 30 May 2016, KF Arbëria is reactivated and Jahir Krasniqi was appointed president of the club, the club was registered in the Second Football League of Kosovo and after one season was promoted to the First Football League of Kosovo. In the 2019–20 season, KF Arbëria for the first time in its history secured promotion to the Football Superleague of Kosovo and this came after Football Federation of Kosovo's executive council stopped the all competitions (including even First Football League of Kosovo) due to the COVID-19 pandemic and decided that together with Besa Pejë, which until then were in the two first positions in the table be automatically promoted to the Superleague.

== Players ==
=== Current squad ===
As of 6 February 2021

Note: Flags indicate national team as defined under FIFA eligibility rules; some limited exceptions apply. Players may hold more than one non-FIFA nationality.

No.	Pos.	Nation	Player
1	GK	KOS	Armend Miftari
6	MF	BRA	Bruno Arrabal
7	FW	KOS	Hysen Bytyqi (captain)
8	MF	KOS	Dior Zabërgja
9	MF	KOS	Kreshnik Bahtiri (3rd captain)
10	MF	KOS	Fidan Bahtiri
11	MF	KOS	Agon Llugiqi
12	GK	KOS	Donat Kaqiu
13	DF	KOS	Ergon Hyseni
14	MF	GER	Andi Seferi (on loan from Union Schafhausen)
15	FW	BRA	Marclei
17	DF	KOS	Çlirim Avdulli
18	MF	ALB	Gresild Lika (on loan from Bylis)

No.	Pos.	Nation	Player
19	FW	SRB	Anes Hot
20	DF	KOS	Lavdim Gashi
21	MF	KOS	Almir Kryeziu
22	DF	KOS	Labinot Ibrahimi (vice-captain)
24	MF	KOS	Agron Bruqi
25	MF	MNE	Aldin Adžović
28	DF	KOS	Leutrim Beqiri
30	DF	KOS	Arbër Pira
91	DF	ALB	Elmir Lekaj
96	GK	KOS	Andi Thaqi
98	MF	KOS	Aldrin Uka
99	FW	GER	Çlirim Koshtanjeva
—	MF	SRB	Aladin Đakovac
