= FC Vitia =

Football club in Kosovo

- Full name: Klubi Futbollistik Vitia
- Short name: FCV
- Founded: 2010; 15 years ago
- Ground: Vitia City Stadium
- Capacity: 3,000
- League: None
- 2022–23: Kosovo Second League, 15th of 16 (relegated)
Home colours	Away colours

FC Vitia (Albanian: Klubi Futbollistik Vitia) is a football club based in the town of Viti, in southeastern Kosovo. Founded in 2010, the club has primarily competed in the lower divisions of the Kosovan football league system, with its highest sustained level being the second tier.

After winning promotion from the third tier in its debut season, Vitia spent several years in the First League, achieving a best finish of fourth place in Group B in the 2020–21 campaign. Relegation followed in 2022, and after another drop from the third tier, the club ceased to appear in official competition.
