= FC Phoenix Banjë =

Football club in Kosovo

- Full name: Klubi Futbollistik Phoenix Banjë
- Founded: 2013; 13 years ago
- Dissolved: 6 July 2024; 23 months ago, merged with FC Besa Peja
- Ground: Stadiumi "Tahir Vokshi"
- Capacity: 1,500
- League: None
- 2023–24 (last): Kosovo First League – Group A, 10th of 10 (relegated)

FC Phoenix Banjë (previously known as KF Onix Banjë) was a professional football club from Kosovo which last competed in the First League. The club was based in Banja of Peja. Their home ground is the Stadiumi "Tahir Vokshi" which has a seating capacity of 1,500. The club merged with FC Besa Peja in 2024.

== See also ==
- List of football clubs in Kosovo
