= KF Liria Prizren =

Football club in Kosovo

Liria
- Full name: Football Club Liria
- Nicknames: Arpagjik't (Onion seeds); Bardhezinjtë (The Black-Whites)
- Short name: Liria
- Founded: 1 February 1930; 96 years ago
- Ground: Përparim Thaçi Stadium
- Capacity: 8,000
- Owner: Agon Elshani
- President: Agon Elshani
- Manager: Ismet Munishi
- League: Kosovo First League
- 2025–26: Kosovo First League, 3rd of 18
- Website: https://fcliria.store/
Home colours	Away colours	Third colours

Football Club Liria (Gheg Albanian pronunciation: [ˈklubi futboɫisˈtik ˈliɾia]), commonly known as Liria, is a professional football club based in Prizren, Kosovo. The club plays in the Kosovo first League, which is the second tier of football in the country. The club is one of the oldest and the most successful clubs in Kosovo.

Active departments of KF Liria
Football (men's)	Football (women's)	

== History ==
=== Early years ===
The first football arrived in Prizren in 1922 from Skopje by an unknown photograph. Although little is known about the clubs history, it was found in 1930. They played in the Yugoslav lower leagues until the beginning of World War II, and during this times as an organized club it changed its name to Sharr, probably after the Sharr Mountains. In this time, it competed in different places in the region. When the region was annexed by Albania. Liria, then was renamed as Prizreni, participated for one season in the 1942 Albanian Superliga. By winning the North Zone, they qualified to the final stage of the tournament, where they lost in the semifinals against Tirana.

After the end of the World War II, the club returned to the Yugoslav football league system. During these time, the regime in power calls the club by its new name, Metohija. The club had this name until 1970 when it was given the name it has today, Liria. The name comes from the Albanian word for "Freedom". From 1945 to 1991, Liria competed in the Kosovo Province League which was a part of the Yugoslav football system. The winners of this league would get promotion to the Yugoslav Second League. During this period, Liria won four province league titles, earning them promotion to play on Yugoslav Second League on series of occasions. With this achievements, Liria was one of the most successful clubs in the Kosovo Province League.

=== Kosovo independent league (1991–1998) ===
In 1991, the Football Federation of Kosovo organized the independent system of football competitions in Kosovo. Liria, played a very historical role in these developments, playing the first historical match, with Ballkani in the village of Studençan in Suhareka. The match was played on 20 August 1991 and ended with a draw. The first historical goal of the newly league was also scored by Lirias, Flamur Bytyçi. In the 1994–95 season, Liria won their first Kosovo league title.

=== Post war (1999–2010) ===
After the Kosovo War, Liria continued competing in the top tier of Kosovan football. In the 2002/03 season, Liria finished second last in the league which resulted relegation to the second division. And after one season, they came first in their group(B) and won promotion to the recently formed elite league, Kosovo Superleague. In the season 2004/05 they finished in 6th place enough for the qualifying rounds of championship playoff. They ended up in 5th place in the playoff with Besa Peje being champions. After some disappointing results in the 2006/2007 season, the club was relegated back to the second division. However, the club won the 2006–07 Kosovar Cup, beating Flamurtari 3–0 on penalties in the final held at Fadil Vokrri Stadium. The club stayed in the second tier for two seasons, until they got their promotion back in the 2008–09 season. The next year, the club won the 2009–10 Kosovar Cup, beating Vëllaznimi 3–1 in extra time.

=== Ups and downs (2011–2020) ===
The seasons after winning the Kosovar cup in the 2009/10 season, things went well for Liria until the 2012/13 season. After one of the worst ever seasons in the clubs history, they were relegated after finishing last in the league. Back in the second division, they played there only for two seasons, before finishing 2nd in the 2014/15 season after Llapi and getting promoted back to the elite. In the first season after promotion, Liria came in the 7th place avoiding relegation playoff with four points. The next season did not go any well either, with the 2016/17 season ending in 8th place and avoiding relegation playoff again by two points. 2017/18 season ended, with Liria in 7th place and once again avoiding relegation playoff by four points. After all of these disappointing season results, the 2018/19 season saw Liria being relegated to the second division, after finishing second last with poor results. In the 2019/20 season in second division, Liria finished 3rd and almost got promoted back with only 5 points between them and the second place, Arbëria.

=== Present (2021–) ===
Second season in the second division after their relegation in 2018/19, the club ended the 20/21 season in 5th place in their group (A).

== Ground ==
Liria play their home matches at the Përparim Thaçi Stadium built in 1937. It was named after a former player of Liria, who also fought in the Kosovo War.

== Support ==
Arpagjik't
- Founded: 2000; 26 years ago
- Type: Ultras club
- Team: KF Liria
- Location: Prizren, Kosovo
- Arena: Përparim Thaçi Stadium
- Colors

Arpagjik't is an Ultras group in Prizren, one of the biggest fan groups in Kosovo. They were created in 2000, after the Kosovo war. Besides football, they also support the basketball club, KB Bashkimi.

They have great rivalry with United City Firm (Peja), Torcida (Trepça), Kuqëzinjët e Jakovës (Vellaznimi), Intelektualet (Drita).

Some subgroups of Arpagjik't are: Warrior Boys (WB), Urban City Boys (UCB), Castle Guards (CG), Ultras HQM (HQM), Out of Control Crew (OCC).

== Honours ==
=== Domestic ===
- Superliga e Kosovës/Kosovo Superleague
  - Winners (1): 1994–95
- Liga e Parë/Second Division
  - Winners (2): 2003–04 (joint-winner), 2008–09
- Kupa e Kosovës/Kosovar Cup
  - Winners (2): 2006–07, 2009–10

=== Yugoslav football league system ===
- Kosovo Province League
  - Winners (4): 1974–75, 1980–81, 1983–84, 1986–87

== Players ==
=== Current squad ===
As of 19 September 2024

No.	Pos.	Nation	Player
2	DF	CAN	Klaidi Cela
4	MF	SEN	Mamadou Cissokho (on loan from Manisa)
6	MF	KOS	Edmond Likaj
7	FW	ALB	Aldi Gjumsi
8	MF	ALB	Diellor Beseni
9	FW	SWE	Valmir Berisha
10	MF	ALB	Arbër Basha
11	FW	KOS	Edin Shishko
12	GK	KOS	Drilon Hodaj
14	DF	RSA	Siyabonga Dube
15	MF	KOS	Ermir Abazi
17	FW	ALB	Fluturim Domi
18	FW	KOS	Elez Elezkurtaj
19	MF	KOS	Leonot Bajrami
20	MF	KOS	Roni Gashi

No.	Pos.	Nation	Player
21	DF	KOS	Albin Kapra
22	FW	ALB	Xhelal Terziqi
24	MF	ALB	Andri Stafa
27	DF	KOS	Redon Arifi
29	FW	KOS	Xhevat Susuri
30	DF	KOS	Rigon Spahiu
31	GK	KOS	Florent Molina
33	FW	ALB	Flavio Meçja
77	GK	ALB	Stivi Frashëri
88	GK	ALB	Arlis Shala
—	MF	KOS	Erand Bacaliu
—	MF	KOS	Getoar Dragusha
—	MF	ALB	Klaudio Leka
—	FW	ALB	Enis Gavazaj
—	FW	ALB	Klevis Dragaj

== Coaching staff ==
Current technical staff
Position	Name
Head coach	Ismet Munishi
Assistant coach	Okan Vural
Goalkeeping coach	Arda Erdoğan
Physiotherapist	Ömer Bilazer
Board members
Office	Name
Chairman	(Kosovo) Rahman Kice

=== Managerial history ===
	Name	Notes
1995	(Serbia and Montenegro) Sinan Osmani	
2015–2016	(Kosovo) Erdogan Celina	
2016	(Kosovo) Skënder Kapra	Caretaker
2016	(Kosovo) Ramiz Krasniqi	
2016	(Kosovo) Genc Tamniku	Caretaker
2016–2017	(Kosovo) Agron Beseni	
2017	(Kosovo) Bekim Bakajt	Caretaker
2017–2018	(Albania) Bledi Shkëmbi	
2018–2019	(Italy) Vincenzo Alberto Annese	
2019	(Kosovo) Erdogan Celina	
2019	(Albania) Samuel Nikaj	
2020	(Kosovo) Skënder Shëngyli	
2020–2021	(Kosovo) Naci Şensoy	
2021–2022	(Kosovo) Erdogan Celina	
2022	(Kosovo) Granit Begolli	
2022–	(North Macedonia) Xhengis Rexhepi	

== Seasons ==
Seasons from 1991, as of 2022. The club has spent most of its time in the top-tier only being relegated 4 times, (2002/03, 2006/07, 2012/13, 2018/19).

- Kosovo Independent League/Kosovo Superleague: 23 seasons
- Second Division: 9 seasons
