= KF Ulpiana =

Football club in Kosovo

- Full name: Klub Futbollistik Ulpiana
- Founded: 1926; 100 years ago
- Ground: Stadiumi "Sami Kelmendi"
- Capacity: 2,500
- Chairman: Jeton Gashi
- League: Kosovo Second League
- 2025–26: Kosovo Second League, 7th of 18
Home colours	Away colours

KF Ulpiana (Albanian: Klubi Futbollistik Ulpiana Lipjan) is a professional football club based in Lipjan, Kosovo.^{[a]} The club plays in the second division of football in Kosovo, Football Superleague of Kosovo.

The club plays its home games at the Sami Kelmendi Stadium, which has a capacity of 2,500, it does not meet the criteria of the Union of European Football Associations.

== History ==
The club was founded in 1926. In the Yugoslav era it was known as KF Slloga Lipjan (Serbian: FK Sloga Lipljan) and won the Kosovo Province League in 1964 and 1965. In 1992, the club's name was changed to KF Ulpiana named after the ancient Dardanian city of Ulpiana and started competing in the Independent League of Kosovo.

== Honours ==
(Socialist Federal Republic of Yugoslavia) Kosovo Province League (pre-1991)

- Champions: 1964, 1965

Kosovo First League Group B

- Champions: 2021

== List of managers ==
- (Albania) Edlir Tetova (14 July 2021 – 28 March 2022)
- (Kosovo) Emin Bajrami (12 July 2022 – 30 June 2024)
