= List of football clubs in Kosovo =

This all-time list features professional football clubs that have competed in Kosovo's four divisions, arranged in alphabetical order. Included are clubs from the women's league and clubs that have been disbanded.

== Active clubs ==
As of 7 July 2024

League championships
Cup championships
Supercup championships

=== Men ===
#	Club	Location	Stadium	Capacity	Founded	Trophies		
#	Club	Location	Stadium	Capacity	Founded	League	Cup	Supercup
1	2 Korriku	Prishtinë	Fusha Sportive 2 Korriku	1,000	1957	0	0	0
2	Arbëria	Lipjan	Sami Kelmendi Stadium	3,200	1977	0	0	0
3	Ballkani	Suharekë	Suva Reka City Stadium	1,500	1947	3	1	2
4	Bashkimi Gjilan	Gjilan	Gjilan Sports Complex	1,000	1941	0	0	0
5	Bashkimi Koretin	Kamenicë	Koretin Stadium	1,200	1974	0	0	0
6	Bashkimi Krushë	Krushë e Madhe	Fusha Sportive Krushë e Madhe	500	1959	0	0	0
7	Behar Vitomirica	Pejë	KF Behari Stadium	1,000	1979	0	0	0
8	Besa	Pejë	Shahin Haxhiislami Stadium	8,500	1923	3	3	2
9	Besa Irzniq	Irzniq	Fusha Sportive Irzniq	500	2010	0	0	0
10	KF Dardanët	Gjakovë	Gjakova City Stadium	6,000	1991	0	0	0
11	Dardania	Qyshk	Dardania Stadium	1,000	1992	0	0	0
12	Deçani	Deçan	Fusha Sportive Deçan	500	1949	0	0	0
13	Dejni	Rahovec	Fusha Sportive Rahovec	500	2000	0	0	0
14	Drini i Bardhë	Gjonaj	Fusha Sportive Gjonaj	500	1975	0	0	0
15	Drenica	Skenderaj	Bajram Aliu Stadium	3,000	1958	0	0	0
16	Drita	Gjilan	Gjilan City Stadium	8,900	1947	5	1	2
17	Dukagjini	Klinë	18 Qershori Stadium	1,000	1958	1	0	1
18	Dukagjini Gjakovë	Gjakovë	Gjakova City Stadium	6,000	1975	0	0	0
19	Dushkaja	Gjakovë	Fusha Sportive Dushkajë	500	2000	0	0	0
20	Ferizaj	Ferizaj	Ismet Shabani Stadium	2,000	1923	0	0	0
21	Feronikeli 74	Drenas	Rexhep Rexhepi Stadium	6,000	08.04.1974	3	3	2
22	Flamurtari	Prishtinë	Xhemail Ibishi Stadium	5,000	22.08.1968	0	2	0
23	Fushë Kosova	Fushë Kosovë	Ekrem Grajqevci Stadium	5,000	1972	0	0	0
24	Galaksia	Gjilan	Galaksia Stadium	1,000	2008	0	0	0
25	Gjakova	Gjakovë	Gjakova City Stadium	6,000	1961	0	0	0
26	Gjilani	Gjilan	Gjilan City Stadium	8,900	1945	0	1	1
27	Hajvalia 2020	Hajvalia	Kishniza Stadium	2,000	28.04.2020	0	0	0
28	Istogu	Istog	Demush Mavraj Stadium	500	1947	0	0	0
29	Kastrioti Ferizaj	Ferizaj	Fusha Sportive Ferizaj	1,000	1997	0	0	0
30	KEK	Obiliq	Agron Rama Stadium	5,000	1928	0	1	1
31	Kika	Hogosht	Kika Stadium	500	1974	0	0	0
32	Korenica	Shkugëz	Fusha Sportive Shkugëz	500	2019	0	0	0
33	Kosovari	Bardh i Madh	Fusha Zejnel Salihu	500	17.08.2011	0	0	0
34	Kosova VR	Prishtinë	Fusha Sportive Bërnicë	1,500	1946	0	1	0
35	Lepenci	Kaçanik	Besnik Begunca Stadium	1,000	1945	0	0	0
36	Lidhja e Prizrenit	Prizren	Fusha Sportive Prizren	2,500	2011	0	0	0
37	Lipjani	Lipjan	Sami Kelmendi	2,500	2018	0	0	0
38	Liria	Prizren	Përparim Thaçi Stadium	10,000	01.02.1930	1	2	0
39	Liria Milloshevë	Milloshevë	Fusha Sportive Milloshevë	500	1999	0	0	0
40	Llapi	Podujevë	Zahir Pajaziti Stadium	5,000	05.07.1932	0	2	1
41	Malisheva	Malishevë	Liman Gegaj Stadium	1,800	2016	0	0	0
42	Minatori	Magurë	Minatori Stadium	500	1946	0	0	0
43	Mitrovica	Mitrovicë	Xhevat Jusufi Stadium	1,000	17.05.2009	0	0	0
44	Opoja	Dragash	Fusha Sportive Dragash	1,000	2010	0	0	0
45	Pashtriku	Rogovë	Fusha Sportive Rogovë	500	1958	0	0	0
46	Phoenix Banjë	Banjë e Pejës	Onix Banjë Stadium	1,500	2013	0	0	0
47	Prishtina	Prishtinë	Fadil Vokrri Stadium	13,500	1922	11	7	11
48	Rahoveci	Rahovec	Selajdin Mullabazi Stadium	1,000	1931	0	0	0
49	Ramiz Sadiku	Prishtinë	Ramiz Sadiku Stadium	5,000	1974	0	0	0
50	Rilindja	Prishtinë	Rilindja Stadium	500	1995	0	0	0
51	Rilindja e Kosovës	Skivjan	Fusha Sportive Skivjan	500	2010	0	0	0
52	Rilindja 1974	Pejë	Fusha Sportive Baran	500	1974	0	0	0
53	Rinia	Miradi e Epërme	Fusha Sportive Rinia	500	1965	0	0	0
54	Runiku	Runik	Fusha Sportive Runik	500	2018	0	0	0
55	Sharri	Hani i Elezit	Suad Brava Stadium	500	1973	0	0	0
56	Shqiponja	Pejë	Shahin Haxhiislami Stadium	8,500	1999	0	0	0
57	Tefik Çanga	Tërn	Fusha Sportive Tërn	500	1978	0	0	0
58	Trepça	Mitrovicë	Adem Jashari Olympic Stadium	18,500	1932	2	1	1
59	Trepça ‘89	Mitrovicë	Riza Lushta Stadium	12,000	1992	1	1	2
60	Ulpiana	Lipjan	Sami Kelmendi Stadium	3,200	1926	0	0	0
61	United Boys Gjakova	Gjakovë	Fusha Sportive Gjakovë	3,500	2019	0	0	0
62	Uniteti	Viti	Fusha Sportive Viti	1,000	1976	0	0	0
63	Vëllazëria	Zhur	Zhur Stadium	2,500	1968	0	0	0
64	Vëllaznimi	Gjakovë	Gjakova City Stadium	6,000	1927	0	1	0
65	Vitia	Viti	Vitia City Stadium	1,000	2010	0	0	0
66	Vjosa	Shtimë	Shtime Stadium	1,000	1985	0	0	0
67	Vllaznia Pozheran	Pozheran	Ibrahim Kurteshi Stadium	1,000	1973	0	0	0
68	Vushtrria	Vushtrri	Ferki Aliu Stadium	6,500	09.05.1922	1	0	1
69	Xërxa	Xërxë	Fusha Sportive Xërxë	1,000	1978	0	0	0

=== Women ===
#	Club	Location	Stadium	Capacity	Founded	Trophies	
#	Club	Location	Stadium	Capacity	Founded	League	Cup
1	Bazeli	Kaçanik	Besnik Begunca Stadium	1,000	2005	0	0
2	Feronikeli	Drenas	Rexhep Rexhepi Stadium	6,000	2006	0	0
3	Intelektualet	Gjilan	Gjilan City Stadium	8,900	2010	0	0
4	Jakova	Gjakovë	Gjakova City Stadium	6,000	2010	0	0
5	Kosova VR	Prishtinë	Ramiz Sadiku Stadium	5,000	2000	2	0
6	Liria	Prizren	Përparim Thaçi Stadium	10,000	1930	0	0
7	Llapi	Podujevë	Zahir Pajaziti Stadium	5,000	2015	0	0
8	Malisheva	Malishevë	Liman Gegaj Stadium	1,800	2010	0	0
9	Mitrovica	Mitrovicë	Riza Lushta Stadium	12,000	2004	5	7
10	Vizioni	Ferizaj	Ismet Shabani Stadium	2,000	2010	0	0

== Disbanded clubs ==
As of 7 July 2024

League championships
Cup championships
Supercup championships

=== Men ===
#	Club	Location	Founded	Disbanded	Trophies		
#	Club	Location	Founded	Disbanded	League	Cup	Supercup
1	A&N	Prizren	2017	2023	0	0	0
2	Bardhi	Zhabar i Epërm	1994	n/a	0	0	0
3	Besiana	Podujevë	1994	2011	0	1	1
4	Besëlidhja Prishtinë	Prishtinë	1956	2003	0	0	0
5	Dardana	Kamenicë	1991	2021	0	0	0
6	Drenasi	Drenas	2000	30.06.2023	0	0	0
7	Hajvalia	Hajvalia	1947	2018	0	0	0
8	Hysi	Podujevë	2002	2014	0	1	1
9	Elektroliza (sq)	Kçiq i Madh	1976	0	0	0	0
10	Shala (sq)	Shala e Bajgorës	1979	0	0	0	0
11	Bashkimi Shipol	Shipol	1990	0	0	0	0
12	Kaolini (lt)	Karaçevë, Kamenicë	1979	0	0	0	0

=== Women ===
#	Club	Location	Founded	Disbanded	Trophies		
#	Club	Location	Founded	Disbanded	League	Cup	Supercup
1	A&N	Prizren	2017	2021	0	0	0

== See also ==
- Football Federation of Kosovo
- List of football clubs in Albania
