= 2020–21 Kosovar Cup =

Tournament details
- Country: Kosovo
- Teams: 40

Final positions
- Champions: Llapi
- Runners-up: Dukagjini

Tournament statistics
- Matches played: 40
- Goals scored: 138 (3.45 per match)
- Top goal scorer(s): Ahmed Januzi (4 goals)
- All statistics correct as of 12 May 2021.

The 2020–21 Kosovar Cup is the football knockout competition of Kosovo in the 2020–21 season.

== First round ==
The draw for the first round was held on 26 October 2020. In this round 10 teams from Second League and Third League of Kosovo are involved.

No	Date	Matches		
1	28.10.2020	Sharri	5–2	Opoja
2	28.10.2020	Lidhja e Prizrenit	1–1 (1–4 p)	Mati
3	28.10.2020	Australia	5–1	Tefik Çanga
4	28.10.2020	Kosova VR	1–0	Vjosa
5	28.10.2020	Korenica	0–2	Prizreni

== Second round ==
Five teams previously qualified from First round took part in Second round. Two winners of both paths advanced into Round of 16, all matches were played in November.

Second round
1	Mati	1
2	Kosova VR	4

Third round
1	Kosova VR	6
2	Sharri	3
3	Prizreni (p)	3 (5)
4	Australia	3 (4)

Qualified
1	Kosova VR
2	Prizreni

== Round of 32 ==
The draw for the Round of 32 was firstly scheduled on 27 November 2020 but later was canceled and postponed until 8 December, so the autumn season will finished and the teams could be seeded into pots using their actual positions. According to the new rules of the competition, from this round the team must be separated into pots.

=== Seeding ===
In this round 32 teams are involved. Two winners from the last round, 10 teams from Superleague and 20 teams from First League of Kosovo are involved.

Seeded	Unseeded
Drita; Ballkani; Prishtina; Gjilani; Feronikeli; Arbëria; Trepça ‘89; Drenica; Llapi; Besa; Dukagjini; Flamurtari; Malisheva; Ulpiania; A&N; Vitia	Istogu; Ferizaj; Onix; Kika; Liria; Dardana; Trepça; Ramiz Sadiku; Vëllaznimi; 2 Korriku; Drenasi; Vllaznia; Vushtrria; KEK-u; Kosova VR; Prizreni

=== Summary ===
The draw for the Round of 32 was held on 8 December 2020, 13:00 CET. The matches were played from 12 December to 17 December 2020. All matches started at 12:30 CET.

No	Date	Matches		
1	12.12.2020	Vitia	2–3	Ferizaj
2	13.12.2020	Vllaznia Pozheran	1–4	Dukagjini Klinë
3	13.12.2020	Malisheva	1–1 (2–3 a.e.t.)	KF 2 Korriku
4	13.12.2020	Ulpiana	2–0	Liria Prizren
5	15.12.2020	Gjilani	5–0	KEK-u
6	16.12.2020	Flamurtari	1–1 (2–1 a.e.t.)	Drenasi
7	16.12.2020	A&N	5–1	Kika Hogosht
8	16.12.2020	Besa	0–2	Istogu
9	16.12.2020	Onix Banjë	2–4	Llapi
10	16.12.2020	Kosova VR	2–6	Prishtina
11	16.12.2020	Dardana	0–1	Ballkani
12	17.12.2020	Prizreni	0–4	Feronikeli
13	17.12.2020	Vëllaznimi	1–3	Trepça '89
14	17.12.2020	Drita	2–1	Trepça
15	17.12.2020	Vushtrria	0–1	Drenica
16	17.12.2020	Ramiz Sadiku	1–2	Arbëria

== Round of 16 ==
The draw for the Round of 16 was held on 11 January 2021, 13:00 CET. The matches were played from 9 to 11 February 2021. All matches started at 13:00 CET.

=== Summary ===
No	Date	Matches		
1	09.02.2021	Llapi	0–0 (4–3 p)	Ballkani
2	09.02.2021	Prishtina	0–0 (1–0 a.e.t.)	Drita
3	09.02.2021	Drenica	4–0	Ulpiana
4	10.02.2021	A&N	1–0	Flamurtari
5	10.02.2021	Trepça '89	4–0	Ferizaj
6	10.02.2021	Istogu	2–0	Gjilani
7	10.02.2021	Arbëria	0–1	Feronikeli
8	11.02.2021	Dukagjini Klinë	3–1	KF 2 Korriku

== Quarter-finals ==
The draw for Quarter-finals was held on 18 February 2021. The matches were played on 17 and 18 March 2021.

=== Summary ===
No	Date	Matches		
1	17.03.2021	Feronikeli	0–0 (2–4 p)	Prishtina
2	17.03.2021	Dukagjini Klinë	1–0	Drenica
3	18.03.2021	Trepça '89	1–2	Llapi
4	18.03.2021	Istogu	1–1 (7–6 p)	A&N

== Semi-finals ==
The draw for the Semifinals was held on 23 March 2021 at 13:00 CET, after FFK presented its new brand. The first semifinal matches take place on April 7, while the return matches on April 21.

=== First leg ===
7 April 2021	Istogu	0–3; Awarded (Note: http://www.ffk-kosova.com/vendim-i-komisionit-te-garave-4/)	Dukagjini	Istog
13:00 (UTC+2)	Mazrekaj 75'	Report	Merlaku 28'; Basriu 77'	Stadium: Demush Mavraj Stadium; Referee: Genc Nuza

7 April 2021	Prishtina	2–3	Llapi	Pristina
13:00 (UTC+2)	Prapashtica 66'; Pefqeli 90+1'	Report	Januzi 6', 59'; Shabani 62'	Stadium: Fadil Vokrri Stadium; Referee: Shpëtim Murtezi

=== Second leg ===
21 April 2021	Dukagjini	Bye	Istogu	Klina
15:00 (UTC+2)		Report		Stadium: 18 June Stadium

21 April 2021	Llapi	2–2 (5–4 agg.)	Prishtina	Podujevë
15:00 (UTC+2)	Januzi 16'; Hyseni 88'	Report	Gavazaj 6'; Pefqeli 63'	Stadium: Zahir Pajaziti Stadium

== Final ==
12 May 2021
20:45 (UTC+2)

Dukagjini	1-1 (a.e.t.)	Llapi
Altin Merlaku 113'	Report	Elvis Prençi 120'
Penalties
V. Kerimi (penalty scored); E. Basiru (penalty scored); F. Gashi (penalty scored); I. Syla (penalty missed); A. Merlaku (penalty missed)	3-4	A. Ramadani (penalty scored); S. Gardasevic (penalty scored); B. Idrizi (penalty scored); A. Januzi (penalty missed); M. Hyseni (penalty scored)

Fadil Vokrri Stadium, Pristina
Attendance: 0
Referee: Genc Nuza

== Statistics ==
=== Top scorers ===
As of matches played on 12 May 2021

Rank	Player	Club	Goals
1	(Albania) Ahmed Januzi	Llapi	4
2	(Kosovo) Naim Daci	Sharri	3
2	(Kosovo) Abedin Merlaku	Dukagjini	3
2	(Kosovo) Mërgim Pefqeli	Prishtina	3
2	(Kosovo) Fatlum Shala	Kosova VR	3
6	(North Macedonia) Marko Simonovski	Feronikeli	2
6	(Kosovo) Kastriot Selmani	Llapi	2
6	(Kosovo) Hasan Hyseni	A&N	2
6	(Kosovo) Leotrim Gashi	A&N	2
