= 2022–23 Kosovar Cup =

Tournament details
- Country: Kosovo
- Teams: 40

Final positions
- Champions: Prishtina
- Runners-up: SC Gjilani

Tournament statistics
- Matches played: 38
- Goals scored: 129 (3.39 per match)
- Top goal scorer(s): Albert Dabiqaj (7 goals)
- All statistics correct as of 19 April 2023.

The 2022–23 Kosovar Cup was the football knockout competition of Kosovo in the 2022–23 season.

== Preliminary rounds ==
=== Bracket ===
First Round
Arbana (IV)	1
Opoja (IV)	3
Sharri (III)	1
KEK-u (III)	2
Kosova VR (III)	2
Prizreni (III)	3
Fortuna Drenas (III)	2 (4)
Behar (III)	2 (5p)
Shkëndija Hajvali (III)	(w/o)
Vitia (III)	0

Second Round
Opoja (III)	bye
–	–
KEK-u (III)	2
Prizreni (III)	3
Behar (III)	1
Shkëndija Hajvali (III)	0

Third Round
Opoja (III)	1
Prizreni (III)	2
Behar (III)	bye
–	–

=== First round ===
The draw for the First Round was held on 7 October 2022 in the offices of the Football Federation of Kosovo. Only 10 teams from the Second League and the Third League of Kosovo participated in this round.

No	Date	Matches		
1	11.10.2022	Sharri (III)	1–2	KEK-u (III)
2	12.10.2022	Fortuna Drenas (III)	2–2 (4–5 p)	Behar (III)
3	12.10.2022	Kosova VR (III)	2–3	Prizreni (III)
4	12.10.2022	Shkëndija Hajvali (III)	3–0 (w/o)	Vitia (III)
5	12.10.2022	Arbana (IV)	1–3	Opoja (IV)

=== Second round ===
The draw for the Second Round was held on 14 October 2022. A total of 5 teams participated in this round with Opoja receiving a bye into the Third Round. All matches were played on 19 October 2022.

No	Date	Matches		
1	19.10.2022	Behar (III)	1–0	Shkëndija Hajvali (III)
2	19.10.2022	KEK-u (III)	2–3	Prizreni (III)
3	Opoja (bye) (IV)			

=== Third round ===
Only 3 teams participated in this round. Behar advanced into the Round of 32 without playing a match.

No	Date	Matches		
1	26.10.2022	Opoja (IV)	1–2	Prizreni (III)
2	Behar (bye) (III)			

== Round of 32 ==
The draw for the Round of 32 took place on 11 November 2022, 13:00 CET. According to the competition regulations, teams in this round must be separated into pots.

=== Seeding ===
A total of 32 teams will participate in this round. Two winners from the preliminary rounds, 10 teams from Superleague and 20 teams from First League of Kosovo will be involved.

Seeded	Unseeded
Drita; Ballkani; Gjilani; Prishtina; Llapi; Malisheva; Dukagjini; Trepça ‘89; Drenica; Ferizaj; Feronikeli 74; Istogu; Rahoveci; Fushë Kosova; Ulpiana; Vushtrria	Liria; Phoenix; Drenasi; Rilindja 1974; KF A&N; Trepça; Vëllaznimi; Ramiz Sadiku; Vëllaznimi; Flamurtari; Vjosa; Kika; Arbëria; 2 Korriku; Ramiz Sadiku; Vllaznia

=== Summary ===
The matches will take place on 17 November 2022, starting at 12:00 CET. Teams that have more than 2 players selected for the November international friendlies, will play their matches on 23 and 24 November 2022.

No	Date	Matches		
1	17.11.2022	Llapi (I)	6–2	Vllaznia Pozheran (II)
2	17.11.2022	Vëllaznimi (II)	(w/o)	Prishtina (I)
3	17.11.2022	Dukagjini Klinë (I)	2–0	Rilindja 1974 (II)
4	17.11.2022	Prizreni (III)	0–0 (2–0 a.e.t.)	Istogu (II)
5	17.11.2022	Feronikeli 74 (II)	4–1	2 Korriku (II)
6	17.11.2022	Vushtrria (II)	1–0	Drenasi (II)
7	17.11.2022	Vjosa (II)	1–0	Ulpiana (II)
8	17.11.2022	Drenica (I)	2–2 (7–8 p)	Flamurtari (II)
9	17.11.2022	Behar (III)	3–0; Awarded	Ferizaj (I)
10	17.11.2022	KF A&N (II)	2–1	Rahoveci (II)
11	17.11.2022	Trepça '89 (I)	3–0	Kika (II)
12	17.11.2022	Trepça (II)	0–5	Gjilani (I)
13	17.11.2022	Fushë Kosova (II)	4–1	Arbëria (II)
14	17.11.2022	Ramiz Sadiku (II)	0–4	Malisheva (I)
15	23.11.2022	Drita (I)	1–2	Liria (II)
16	24.11.2022	Phoenix Banjë (II)	1–3	Ballkani (I)

== Round of 16 ==
The draw for the Round of 16 took place on 1 December 2022. The matches will kick-off at 13:00 CET take place on 4 and 5 February 2023.

=== Summary ===
No	Date	Matches		
1	04.02.2023	Liria (II)	2–3	Llapi (I)
2	04.02.2023	Feronikeli 74 (II)	0-3; Awarded	Trepça '89 (I)
3	04.02.2023	Ballkani (I)	2–0	KF A&N (II)
4	04.02.2023	Flamurtari (II)	1–1 (3–4 p)	Vushtrria (II)
5	05.02.2023	Gjilani (I)	4–0	Vjosa (II)
6	05.02.2023	Behar (III)	3–1	Prizreni (III)
7	05.02.2023	Malisheva (I)	2–0	Fushë Kosova (II)
8	06.02.2023	Prishtina (I)	3–1	Dukagjini Klinë (I)

== Quarter-finals ==
The draw for the Quarter-finals was held on 28 February 2023.

=== Summary ===
The matches took place on 15 March 2023.

No	Date	Stadium	Referee	Matches		
1	15.03.2023	Riza Lushta Stadium	Genc Nuza	Trepça '89 (I)	1–5	SC Gjilani (I)
2	15.03.2023	Zahir Pajaziti Stadium	Burim Jahmurataj	Llapi (I)	2–2 (a.e.t.) (6–5 p)	Malisheva (I)
3	15.03.2023	Ferki Aliu Stadium	Visar Kastrati	Vushtrria (II)	1–0	Behari (III)
4	15.03.2022	Fadil Vokrri Stadium	Dardan Çaka	Prishtina (I)	2–0	Ballkani (I)

== Semi-finals ==
The draw for the semi-finals was held on 21 March 2023.

=== First leg ===
5 April 2023	Llapi	1–2	SC Gjilani	Podujevë
15:00 (UTC+2)	Selimi 39'	Report	Jashari 7'; Islami 17'	Stadium: Zahir Pajaziti Stadium; Referee: Gramos Shala

5 April 2023	Vushtrria	1–2	Prishtina	Vushtrri
15:00 (UTC+2)	Chibueze 18'	Report	Krasniqi 83', 90'	Stadium: Ferki Aliu Stadium; Referee: Mervan Bejtullahu

=== Second leg ===
19 April 2023	SC Gjilani	1–0 (3–1 agg.)	Llapi	Gjilan
15:00 (UTC+2)	Ramadani 35'	Report		Stadium: Gjilan City Stadium; Referee: Gramos Shala

19 April 2023	Prishtina	6–0 (8–1 agg.)	Vushtrria	Pristina
15:00 (UTC+2)	Hyseni 8'; Kryeziu 16', 36'; Pefqeli 74'; Jashari 83' (pen.)	Report		Stadium: Fadil Vokrri Stadium; Referee: Mervan Bejtullahu

== Final ==
5 June 2023
18:00 CEST

SC Gjilani	0–2	Prishtina
		Hamiti 67'; Pefqeli 74'

Fadil Vokrri Stadium, Pristina
Referee: Visar Kastrati

== Statistics ==
=== Top scorers ===
As of matches played on 19 April 2023

Rank	Player	Club	Goals
1	(Kosovo) Albert Dabiqaj	Gjilani	7
2	(Kosovo) Leotrim Kryeziu	Prishtina	3
2	(Mexico) Francisco Rivera	Llapi	3
2	(Kosovo) Gramoz Bajra	Prizreni	3
3	(Kosovo) Armend Kryeziu	Prizreni	2
