= 2016–17 Kosovar Cup =

Tournament details
- Country: Kosovo

Final positions
- Champions: KF Besa Pejë
- Runners-up: KF Llapi

The 2016–17 Kosovar Cup was the football knockout competition of Kosovo in the 2016–17 season.

== First round ==
These matches were played on 29 June 2016.

| Team 1 | Score | Team 2 |
|---|---|---|
| KF Opoja (III) | 3–0 | KF Përparimi (III) |
| KF Behari (III) | 3–2 | KF Kaolini (III) |
| KF Australia (III) | 4–3 | KF Kastrioti (III) |
| KF Ratkoci (III) | 1–5 | KF Dardana (III) |
| KF Bashkimi (III) | 3–0 | Ril. e Kosovës (III) |
| KF Besa Irzniq (III) | 5–2 | KF Bashkimi Gjilan (III) |
| KF Ujv. e Malishevës (III) | 6–0 | KF Vjosa (III) |
| KF 18 Korriku (III) | 0–3 | KF Kika (III) |
| KF Lepenci (III) | 2–0 | KF Gryka (III) |
| KF Luftëtari (III) | 3–6 | KF Tefik Çanga (III) |
| KF Xërxa (III) | 5–2 | KF Dukagjini (III) |
| KF Iliria (III) | 0–3 | KF Beselidhja (III) |
| KF Leshani (III) | 4–3 | KF Dushkaja (III) |
| KF Lugu i Baranit (III) | 2–1 | KF Onix Banja (III) |
| KF Galaksia (III) | 4–5 | KF Minatori (III) |

== Second round ==
These matches were played on 25 & 26 October 2016.

| Team 1 | Score | Team 2 |
|---|---|---|
| KF Opoja (III) | 1–4 | KF Flamurtari (II) |
| KF Leshani (III) | 2–5 | KF Australia (III) |
| KF Beselidhja (III) | w/o | KF Lepenci (III) |
| KF Tefik Çanga (III) | 0–2 | KF Fushë Kosova (II) |
| KF Istogu (II) | 4–2 (a.e.t.) | KF Behari (III) |
| KF Lugu i Baranit (III) | 3–2 (a.e.t.) | KF Ramiz Sadiku (II) |
| KF Bashkimi (III) | 2–0 | KF Kika (III) |
| KF Vëllaznimi (II) | 3–1 | KF Vitia (II) |
| KF Ulpiana (II) | 2–0 | KF Kosova Prishtinë (II) |
| KF Ujv. e Malishevës (III) | 2–3 | KF 2 Korriku (II) |
| KF Deçani (II) | 0–4 | KF KEK (II) |
| KF Minatori (III) | 0–8 | KF Dukagjini (III) |
| KF Besa Irzniq (III) | 1–0 | KF Rahoveci (II) |
| KF Vllaznia (II) | 3–1 | KF Dardana (III) |
| KF Xërxa (III) | 0–2 | KF Arbëria (III) |

== Third round ==
These matches were played on 23 November 2016.

| Team 1 | Score | Team 2 |
|---|---|---|
| KF Flamurtari (II) | 1–0 | KF Australia (III) |
| KF Fushë Kosova (II) | 2–2 (a.e.t.) (6–7 p) | KF Dukagjini (III) |
| FC Vushtrria (II) | 0–0 (a.e.t.) (4–5 p) | KF Vllaznia (II) |
| KF 2 Korriku (II) | 2–1 | KF Istogu (II) |
| KF Arbëria (III) | 3–1 | KF Lugu i Baranit (III) |
| KF KEK (II) | 4–1 | KF Ulpiana (II) |
| KF Lepenci (III) | 0–2 | KF Vëllaznimi (II) |
| KF Bashkimi (III) | 3–1 (a.e.t.) | KF Besa Irzniq (III) |

== Fourth round ==
These matches were played on 3 December 2016.

| Team 1 | Score | Team 2 |
|---|---|---|
| KF Flamurtari (II) | 3–1 | KF Vllaznia (II) |
| KF Bashkimi (III) | 3–1 | KF 2 Korriku (II) |
| KF KEK (II) | 3–1 | KF Dukagjini (III) |
| KF Vëllaznimi (II) | 2–1 | KF Arbëria (III) |

== Fifth Round ==
These matches were played on 18, 19, and 21 February 2017.

| Team 1 | Score | Team 2 |
|---|---|---|
| KF Besa Pejë (I) | 3–1 (a.e.t.) | FC Drita (I) |
| KF Drenica (I) | 3–0 | KF KEK (II) |
| KF Ferizaj (I) | 1–0 | KF Gjilani (I) |
| KF Feronikeli (I) | 2–2 (a.e.t.) (2–4 p) | KF Llapi (I) |
| KF Hajvalia (I) | 0–4 | KF Trepça'89 (I) |
| KF Flamurtari (II) | 0–0 (a.e.t.) (4–5 p) | KF Trepça (I) |
| KF Vëllaznimi (II) | 0–1 | FC Prishtina (I) |
| KF Liria (I) | 2–0 | KF Bashkimi (III) |

== Quarter-finals ==
The matches were played on 15 and 16 March 2017.

| Team 1 | Score | Team 2 |
|---|---|---|
| KF Trepça (I) | 2–2 (a.e.t.) (4-3 p) | KF Trepça'89 (I) |
| KF Drenica (I) | 1–0 | KF Ferizaj (I) |
| KF Llapi (I) | 4–3 (a.e.t.) | KF Liria (I) |
| KF Besa Pejë (I) | 1–0 | FC Prishtina (I) |

== Semi-finals ==
These matches will be played on 29 March and 19 April 2017.

=== First leg ===
| 29 March 2017 | KF Trepça | 2–2 | KF Besa Pejë | Mitrovica |
| 14:00 | P. Hajdini 40'; D. Beqiri 70' | Report | Q. Elshani 6'; F. Qorraj 63' | Stadium: Olympic Stadium Adem Jashari; Referee: Besfort Kosumi |

| 29 March 2017 | KF Drenica | 0–0 | KF Llapi | Skenderaj |
| 14:00 | | Report | | Stadium: Bajram Aliu Stadium; Referee: Kreshnik Vula |

=== Second leg ===
| 19 April 2017 | KF Besa Pejë | 6–0 (8–2 agg.) | KF Trepça | Peć |
| 14:00 | Xh. Shabani 3', 31'; D. Sheqerolli 37', 64'; F. Karahoda 70'; K. Rexha 78' | Report | | Stadium: Shahin Haxhiislami Stadium; Referee: Besfort Kosumi |

| 19 April 2017 | KF Llapi | 4–1 (4–1 agg.) | KF Drenica | Podujevë |
| 14:00 | F. Bërbatovci 18', 60'; H.Namani 48', 69' | Report | A. Abazi 90+' | Stadium: Zahir Pajaziti Stadium; Referee: Kreshnik Vula |

== Final ==
The final of the Kosovar Cup for this season will be played on May 31, 2017 at the Riza Lushta Stadium.

| 31 May 2017 | KF Llapi | 1–1 (a.e.t.) (2–4 p) | KF Besa Pejë | Mitrovica |
| 16:30 | F. Krasniqi 49' (pen.) | | D. Miftaraj 28' (pen.) | Stadium: Riza Lushta Stadium; Attendance: 6,000; Referee: Genc Nuza |
| | Penalties |
| | F. Bërbatovci (penalty scored); F. Krasniqi (penalty scored); B. Hyseni (penalty missed); K. Shabani (penalty missed) | | P. Osmani (penalty scored); D. Miftaraj (penalty scored); L. Emini (penalty scored); F. Papuçi (penalty scored); F. Kasapi (penalty missed) |
