= Nue Nreca =

Kosovan footballer

Personal information
- Full name: Nue Nreca
- Date of birth: 25 June 2001 (age 25)
- Place of birth: Gjakova, Kosovo under UN administration
- Height: 1.82 m (6 ft 0 in)
- Position: Left-back

Team information
- Current team: Mitrovica

Youth career
- –2018: Gjakova

Senior career*
Years	Team	Apps	(Gls)
2018–2020	Gjakova		
2020	Vëllazëria		
2020–2021	Rahoveci		
2021–2022	Hrvatski Dragovoljac	2	(0)
2022–2023	Rahoveci		
2023	Prizreni		
2023	Suhareka	0	(0)
2023–2024	Drenica		
2024	Phoenix Banje		
2025	Mitrovica		
2025–	Faetano	0	(0)
- * Club domestic league appearances and goals as of 9 August 2023

Nue Nreca (born 25 June 2001) is a Kosovan professional footballer who plays as a left-back for Faetano.

== Club career ==
=== Gjakova ===
Nreca started playing football in Gjakova and was part of the youth team until 2 September 2018, where he was promoted and made his debut with Gjakova's first team in the league first match against Pashtriku, but he was sent off after receiving red card in the final minutes of the match and was subsequently sentenced with two non-match games.

=== Vëllazëria and Rahoveci ===
On 13 February 2020, Nreca joined Second Football League of Kosovo club Vëllazëria. At the end of the summer transfer period on 27 August 2020, he was transferred to other Second Football League of Kosovo club Rahoveci, where he stayed until January 2021, where he joined Fushë Kosova, but after 24 hours he terminated his contract with Fushë Kosova and was returned to Rahoveci where he extended the contract with them.

=== Hrvatski Dragovoljac ===
On 20 July 2021, Nreca signed his first professional contract with Croatian First Football League side Hrvatski Dragovoljac after agreeing to a three-year deal. Nineteen days later, he made his debut in a 1–2 home defeat against Osijek after being named in the starting line-up.
