= Albion Rrahmani =

Kosovan footballer (born 2000)

Personal information
- Full name: Albion Rrahmani
- Date of birth: 31 August 2000 (age 26)
- Place of birth: Podujevë, Kosovë
- Height: 1.88 m (6 ft 2 in)
- Position: Striker

Team information
- Current team: Venezia
- Number: 7

Youth career
- –2019: Llapi

Senior career*
Years	Team	Apps	(Gls)
2019–2020	Minatori		(16)
2020	Bashkimi Koretin	2	(4)
2020–2021	Malisheva		(16)
2021–2023	Ballkani	49	(24)
2023–2024	Rapid București	28	(18)
2024–2026	Sparta Prague	57	(16)
2026–	Venezia	7	(0)

International career^{‡}
2023–	Kosovo	27	(7)
- * Club domestic league appearances and goals as of 23:53, 25 October 2026 (UTC) ‡ National team caps and goals as of 16:16, 18 November 2026 (UTC)

Albion Rrahmani (born 31 August 2000) is a Kosovar professional footballer who plays as a striker for Serie A club Venezia and the Kosovo national team.

Rrahmani started his senior career in Kosovo at Minatori, Bashkimi Koretin, Malisheva, and Ballkani. With the latter side, he won three domestic trophies and became the top scorer of the national league in the 2022–23 season. Soon after, he moved to Romanian team Rapid București for an initial €600,000 fee, which made him the most expensive player ever signed from the Kosovo Superleague. In 2024, he transferred to Sparta Prague for €5 million, where he stayed until June 2026, when he joined FC Venezia for €7,5 million.

Internationally, Rrahmani earned his first cap for the Kosovo senior team in a 0–2 UEFA Euro qualifier loss to Romania in September 2023.

== Club career ==
=== Early career / Ballkani ===
Rrahmani's youth career began at local club Llapi. At the age of 18, he paused his active career for half a year. On 8 September 2019, Rrahmani returned from career break and joined with Kosovo Second League club Minatori, and during his first season as a senior, he contributed by scoring 16 goals in the first half of the season.

On 24 January 2020, Rrahmani joined Kosovo Second League side Bashkimi Koretin. His debut with Bashkimi Koretin came on 29 February in a 1–1 away draw against Rahoveci. Eight days after debut, Rrahmani scored his first (four) goals for Bashkimi Koretin in his second appearance for the club in a 10–0 home win over Galaksia in Kosovo Second League, the match which was the last for the club due to Football Federation of Kosovo's executive council stopped the all competitions (including even Kosovo Second League) due to the COVID-19 pandemic.

On 25 August 2020, Rrahmani joined Kosovo First League side Malisheva. and during his first season, he contributed by scoring 16 goals, which ensured the club promotion in the Kosovo Superleague for the first time in the history of the club, and for his contribution he received the nickname Lewandowski i Malishevës (Lewandowski of Malisheva).

On 23 June 2021, Rrahmani signed a three-year contract with Kosovo Superleague club Ballkani.

=== Rapid București ===
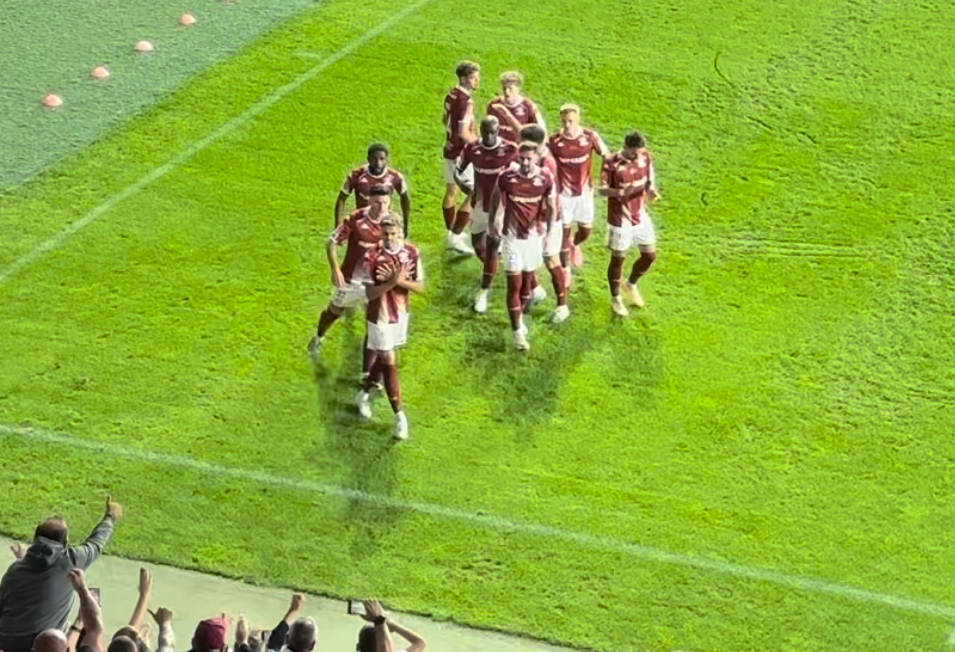
Rrahmani performing the crossed hands after scoring a goal against CFR Cluj, 25 September 2023

On 6 August 2023, Ballkani announced the move of Rrahmani to Romanian club Rapid București. The following day, Rapid București confirmed that he signed a three-year deal and received the squad number 9. The initial €600,000 transfer fee (which raised to €1.35 million after bonuses) made Rrahmani the most expensive player of the Kosovo Superleague, and Rapid reportedly outbid rivals Petrolul Ploiești for his signing. Fellow Liga I clubs CFR Cluj and FCSB had also scouted the player.

Rrahmani recorded his league debut on 25 August 2023, coming on as a 46th-minute substitute for Marko Dugandžić and scoring twice in the 5–3 away win over FC U Craiova. One week later, he scored another two goals in a 4–0 local derby thrashing of Dinamo București. On 25 September, Rrahmani netted his third double of the season in a 3–1 home defeat of CFR Cluj.

On 9 March 2024, Rrahmani scored a double and assisted compatriot Ermal Krasniqi in a 4–0 win over rivals FCSB in the last fixture of the regular season. He scored once more against FCSB on 20 April, in a 2–2 away draw in the championship play-offs. Despite having suffered an injury in October 2023 that sidelined him for several months, Rrahmani finished the season as the third-best goal scorer of the Liga I with 17 goals.

=== Sparta Prague ===
On 17 August 2024, Rapid București shareholder Victor Angelescu announced an agreement for the transfer of Rrahmani to Sparta Prague for €5 million and 15% interest. Two days later, he was officially unveiled by the Czech First League club. Rrahmani was handed the number 10 jersey and made his debut on 27 August, scoring a goal with his first ever touch for the club in a 2–0 victory over Malmö FF in the UEFA Champions League play-off round (4–0 win on aggregate). Upon the return of Jan Kuchta to Sparta on loan from FC Midtjylland, Rrahmani changed his number to 9.

=== Venezia FC ===
On June 9 2026, Albion Rrahmani completed his move to newly promoted Serie A club Venezia FC, for a transfer fee of €7,5 million plus add ons, including a 10% sell-on clause.

== International career ==
=== Youth ===
Rrahmani was called up by the Kosovo national under-21 team for a 2023 UEFA European Championship qualifier against Andorra on 8 June 2021, but was an unused substitute in the 2–0 home win.

=== Senior ===
On 17 March 2023, Rrahmani was included in the Kosovo senior team's extended roster for the Euro 2024 qualifying matches against Israel and Andorra, but was left out of the final squad. He went on to make his full debut on 12 September that year, coming on as an 81st-minute substitute for Bernard Berisha in a 0–2 away loss to Romania in the same competition.

Rrahmani started his first match on 12 October 2023, a 3–0 win against Andorra in which he came off the field in the second half after fracturing his ankle. On 9 September 2024, he scored his first goal in a 4–0 away Nations League thrashing of Cyprus.

On 9 June 2025, Rrahmani scored his first international hat-trick in a friendly match against Comoros in a 4–2 win.

== Career statistics ==
=== Club ===
As of match played 1 November 2026

Appearances and goals by club, season and competition
Club	Season	League			National cup (Note: Includes Kosovar Cup, Cupa României, Czech Cup)		Europe		Total	
Club	Season	Division	Apps	Goals	Apps	Goals	Apps	Goals	Apps	Goals
Ballkani	2021–22	Superleague of Kosovo	14	3	1	1	—		15	4
Ballkani	2022–23	Superleague of Kosovo	35	21	0	0	14 (Note: Two appearances in UEFA Champions League, twelve appearances and seven goals in UEFA Conference League)	7	49	28
Ballkani	2023–24	Superleague of Kosovo	—		—		4 (Note: Two appearances in UEFA Champions League, two appearances and two goals in UEFA Conference League)	2	4	2
Ballkani	Total		49	24	1	1	18	9	68	34
Rapid București	2023–24	Liga I	25	17	1	0	—		26	17
Rapid București	2024–25	Liga I	3	1	—		—		3	1
Rapid București	Total		28	18	1	0	—		29	18
Sparta Prague	2024–25	Czech First League	22	5	4	3	7 (Note: Appearances in UEFA Champions League)	2	33	10
Sparta Prague	2025–26	Czech First League	33	11	2	1	13 (Note: Appearances in UEFA Conference League)	4	48	15
Sparta Prague	Total		55	16	6	4	20	6	81	25
Venezia	2026–27	Serie A	8	0	2	0	—		10	0
Career total			140	58	10	5	38	15	188	77

=== International ===
As of match played 17 November 2026

Appearances and goals by national team and year
National team	Year	Apps	Goals
Kosovo
Kosovo	2023	2	0
Kosovo	2024	9	1
Kosovo	2025	10	5
Kosovo	2026	6	0
Total		27	7

Scores and results list Kosovo's goal tally first, score column indicates score after each Rrahmani goal.

List of international goals scored by Albion Rrahmani
No.	Date	Venue	Opponent	Score	Result	Competition
1	9 September 2024	AEK Arena – Georgios Karapatakis, Larnaca, Cyprus	Cyprus	3–0	4–0	2024–25 UEFA Nations League
2	6 June 2025	Fadil Vokrri Stadium, Pristina, Kosovo	Armenia	4–2	5–2	Friendly
3	6 June 2025	Fadil Vokrri Stadium, Pristina, Kosovo	Armenia	5–2	5–2	Friendly
4	9 June 2025	Fadil Vokrri Stadium, Pristina, Kosovo	Comoros	1–1	4–2	Friendly
5	9 June 2025	Fadil Vokrri Stadium, Pristina, Kosovo	Comoros	2–1	4–2	Friendly
6	9 June 2025	Fadil Vokrri Stadium, Pristina, Kosovo	Comoros	3–1	4–2	Friendly
7	7 June 2026	Fadil Vokrri Stadium, Pristina, Kosovo	Andorra	2–0	3–0	Friendly

== Honours ==
Ballkani

- Kosovo Superleague: 2021–22, 2022–23
- Kosovar Supercup: 2022

Individual

- Kosovo Superleague top scorer: 2022–23
- Gazeta Sporturilor Player of the Month: February 2024
