= 2007–08 Football Superleague of Kosovo =

Football Superleague of Kosovo
- Season: 2007–08
- Champions: FC Prishtina; 7th title
- Relegated: KF KEK, KF Shqiponja, KF Fushë Kosova
- Matches: 241
- Goals: 715 (2.97 per match)
- Average goals/game: 2.36

The 2007–08 Football Superleague of Kosovo season, also known as the Raiffeisen Superleague of Kosovo (Albanian: Raiffeisen Superliga e Kosovës) for sponsorship reasons with Raiffeisen was the ninth (Note: This season was the 9th season under the name Football Superleague of Kosovo, the 15th season of top-tier football in Kosovo and the 61st season of football in Kosovo overall.) season of top-tier football in Kosovo. The campaign began on 25 August 2007, and ended on 1 June 2008.

2007–08 Football Superleague of Kosovo was organized by the Football Federation of Kosovo and the division had a 16-team format. The clubs play each other twice (home and away) during the season for a 30-match schedule. At the end of the season, the bottom three teams in the division were relegated to the second division of football in Kosovo, First Football League of Kosovo.

FC Prishtina won the title for the third time since the end of the war, and the seventh time since the breakup of Yugoslavia.

== Teams ==
Sixteen teams of Football Superleague of Kosovo season 2007–08 and their position at the end of the season:

Locations of the 2007–08 Football Superleague of Kosovo teams

Team	Club home city	2006–07 Season	Stadium	Stadium capacity
KF Besa Pejë	Peć	1st	Shahin Haxhiislami Stadium	8,500
KF Besiana	Podujevo	13th	City Stadium	3,000
KF Drenica	Skenderaj	4th	Bajram Aliu Stadium	3,000
FC Drita	Gjilan	Liga e Parë, 1st	Gjilan City Stadium (Note: Drita and Gjilan use this stadium together and have named the stadium with different names. Drita and their fans named the stadium as Selami Osmani-Bezi Stadium, while Gjilan and their fans named the stadium as Agim Ramadani Stadium, but officially the stadium is named Gjilan City Stadium.)	10,000
KF Flamurtari	Pristina	7th	Flamurtari Stadium	2,500
KF Fushë Kosova	Kosovo Polje	Liga e Parë, 3rd	City Stadium	Unknown
SC Gjilani	Gjilan	10th	Gjilan City	10,000
KF Hysi	Podujevo	6th	Merdarë Stadium	2,000
KF KEK	Obilić	5th	Agron Rama Stadium	15,000
KF 2 Korriku	Pristina	Liga e Parë, 2nd	Stadiumi 2 Korriku	Unknown
KF Kosova Vushtrri	Vushtrri	8th	Ferki Aliu Studium	5,000
FC Prishtina	Pristina	2nd	Fadil Vokrri Stadium	25,000
KF Shqiponja	Peć	9th	Shahin Haxhiislami Stadium	8,500
KF Trepça	Mitrovica	12th	Adem Jashari Olympic Stadium	29,000
KF Trepça'89	Mitrovica	3rd	Riza Lushta	7,000
KF Vëllaznimi	Gjakova	11th	City Stadium	6.000

== League table ==
Pos	Team	Pld	W	D	L	GF	GA	GD	Pts	Relegation
1	Prishtina (C)	30	20	5	5	61	19	+42	65	
2	Vëllaznimi	30	19	4	7	65	32	+33	61	
3	Besa Pejë	30	18	4	8	77	43	+34	58	
4	Gjilani	30	16	8	6	48	25	+23	56	
5	Hysi	30	13	6	11	32	30	+2	45	
6	Flamurtari	30	12	7	11	52	55	−3	43	
7	2 Korriku	30	12	5	13	46	54	−8	41	
8	Kosova Vushtrri	30	11	7	12	44	34	+10	40	
9	Trepça	30	10	10	10	40	36	+4	40	
10	Drenica	30	11	6	13	33	43	−10	39	
11	Trepça'89	30	11	6	13	52	47	+5	39	
12	Drita	30	10	8	12	39	48	−9	38	
13	Besiana	30	10	7	13	31	49	−18	37	
14	Fushë Kosova (R)	30	10	7	13	40	45	−5	37	Relegation to 2008–09 Liga e Parë
15	Shqiponja (R)	30	4	5	21	33	87	−54	17	Relegation to 2008–09 Liga e Parë
16	KEK (R)	30	3	5	22	22	68	−46	14	Relegation to 2008–09 Liga e Parë

Source: rsssf.org
Rules for classification: 1st points; 2nd head-to-head points; 3rd head-to-head goal difference; 4th overall wins; 5th goal difference; 6th goals scored
(C) Champions; (R) Relegated

=== Relegation play-offs ===
Date	13th place Raiffeisen Superliga	Result	14th place Raiffeisen Superliga	Goals
8 June 2008	KF Besiana	0-0 (aet), Pen. 5 - 4	KF Fushë Kosova	

Promotion from Liga e Parë to Raiffeisen Superliga for 2008–09 season have secured: KF Istogu, KF Ferizaj and KF Ulpiana.

== Results ==
Home \ Away	KOR	BES	BSN	DRE	DRI	FLA	FUS	GJI	HYS	KEK	VUS	PRI	SHQ	TRE	T89	VLZ
2 Korriku		1–2	5–2	2–0	2–1	4–2	1–0	0–2	0–2	2–0	2–1	0–1	2–1	2–2	3–2	1–1
Besa Pejë	1–2		2–0	4–1	6–2	4–1	3–0	2–1	1–2	4–1	2–1	1–0	4–1	4–1	4–2	3–2
Besiana	4–2	0–0		2–0	0–0	2–1	2–1	1–1	2–0	1–2	2–0	0–4	4–1	0–3 (Note: Match awarded.)	1–0	0–3
Drenica	1–0	4–3	2–0		4–0	1–1	3–0	0–0	1–0	1–0	1–0	0–1	1–1	0–0	1–1	1–0
Drita	3–1	2–1	3–0	0–0		3–0	0–0	1–1	2–1	3–2	1–1	1–1	3–1	2–0	1–0	1–1
Flamurtari	4–3	4–2	0–0	3–1	4–3		2–3	3–2	1–0	2–0	3–0	2–5	3–0	2–1	3–2	1–2
Fushë Kosova	1–1	2–4	2–1	2–1	1–0	1–1		0–1	0–1	2–0	1–1	2–1	9–3	0–0	1–0	1–0
Gjilani	4–1	0–0	2–1	4–0	2–0	2–0	2–2		1–0	4–0	2–1	1–2	3–0	2–0	1–1	1–0
Hysi	1–1	0–2	0–1	2–0	3–1	1–1	1–0	1–1		2–0	0–0	2–1	3–0	3–1	3–2	0–1
KEK	2–3	1–1	2–3	0–5	0–2	2–2	1–2	1–2	1–2		0–0	0–0	1–0	0–2	0–1	1–2
Kosova Vushtrri	1–0	1–2	2–0	6–1	2–1	0–0	4–0	1–1	0–2	0–0		1–0	8–0	2–1	2–1	3–1
Prishtina	2–0	2–0	5–0	4–0	5–0	0–0	0–0	3–1	3–0	2–0	2–1		3–0	1–0	4–1	4–3
Shqiponja	1–2	2–10	1–1	1–0	2–1	3–5	3–2	0–1	0–0	1–2	3–2	1–2		2–2	1–1	2–3
Trepça	3–3	2–1	0–0	0–1	1–1	1–0	2–1	0–1	2–0	5–2	3–1	0–0	3–0		1–1	0–0
Trepça'89	4–0	3–2	1–1	3–1	2–0	5–0	4–3	1–0	0–0	5–1	1–2	2–1	3–1	2–3		0–1
Vëllaznimi	3–0	2–2	4–0	3–1	4–1	2–1	2–1	3–2	4–0	7–0	1–0	0–2	3–1	2–1	5–1	

Legend: Blue = home team win; Yellow = draw; Red = away team win.
