= FC Hajvalia 2020 =

Football club in Kosovo

- Full name: Football Club Hajvalia 2020 (Klubi Futbollistik Hajvalia 2020)
- Short name: Hajvalia 2020
- Founded: 28 April 2020; 4 years ago
- Ground: Kishnica Stadium
- Owner: Bashkim Rama
- President: Mehdin Pergjegjaj
- League: Kosovo Third League
- 2022–23: Kosovo Third League – Kosovo Plain's Group A, 3rd of 10

Football Club Hajvalia 2020 (Albanian: Klubi Futbollistik Hajvalia 2020), commonly known as Hajvalia 2020, is a football club based in village Hajvalia of Pristina, Kosovo. The team is due to begin play from 2020 to 2021 season in the Second Football League of Kosovo, which is the third tier of football in the country.

== History ==
After the dissolution of KF Hajvalia in the summer of 2018, the village of Hajvalia was left without any sports club. While two years later, respectively on 28 April 2020 (date belonging to the date of club registration in the competent authorities) established FC Hajvalia 2020 by a group of friends and former footballers led by Albatrit Matoshi and his friends with great support from the rest of society, businesses and diaspora, where according to club officials, the club's goal will be not just to advance to the above leagues or participate in competitions, but to create a socialization and education platform that crosses the boundaries of sports, especially for footballers of youth categories. Sixteen days later, former president and investor of KF Hajvalia, Mehdin Pergjegjaj was appointed president of the Hajvalia 2020.

== Players ==
=== Current squad ===
As of 17 May 2020

Note: Flags indicate national team as defined under FIFA eligibility rules; some limited exceptions apply. Players may hold more than one non-FIFA nationality.

No.	Pos.	Nation	Player
—	GK	(Kosovo) KOS	Urim Gashi
—	DF	(Kosovo) KOS	Besart Gashi
—	DF	(Kosovo) KOS	Besir Gashi
—	DF	(Kosovo) KOS	Liridon Xheladini
—	DF	(Kosovo) KOS	Musa Spahiu
—	DF	(Kosovo) KOS	Venhar Kadriu
—	MF	(Kosovo) KOS	Andi Kllokoqi
—	MF	(Kosovo) KOS	Driton Hoti
—	MF	(Kosovo) KOS	Durim Gashi
—	MF	(Kosovo) KOS	Egber Vitia
—	MF	(Kosovo) KOS	Egzon Sopjani

No.	Pos.	Nation	Player
—	MF	(Kosovo) KOS	Elior Blakçori
—	MF	(Kosovo) KOS	Genc Limani
—	MF	(Kosovo) KOS	Gent Rexha
—	MF	(Kosovo) KOS	Habib Vrajolli
—	MF	(Kosovo) KOS	Jetlir Leci
—	MF	(Kosovo) KOS	Jeton Kosumi
—	MF	(Kosovo) KOS	Sami Korqa
—	FW	(Kosovo) KOS	Besnik Hajdini
—	FW	(Kosovo) KOS	Blendon Gërbeshi
—	FW	(Kosovo) KOS	Fatos Morina
—	FW	(Kosovo) KOS	Xhevahir Haxholli
