= KF Liria Milloshevë =

Football club in Kosovo

- Full name: Klub Futbollistik Liria Milloshevë
- Founded: 1999; 26 years ago
- Ground: Muzakaj Sports Field
- Capacity: 500

KF Liria Milloshevë (Albanian: Klubi Futbollistik Liria Milloshevë) is a professional football club from Kosovo which competes in the Third League (Group B). The club is based in Muzakaj, Obiliq. Their home ground is the Muzakaj Sports Field which has a viewing capacity of 500.

== Notable players ==
- (Kosovo) Ardit Tahiri

== See also ==
- List of football clubs in Kosovo
