= KF Gjakova =

Football club in Kosovo

- Full name: Klub Futbollistik Gjakova
- Founded: 1961; 64 years ago
- Ground: Gjakova City Stadium
- Capacity: 6,000

KF Gjakova (Albanian: Klubi Futbollistik Gjakova) is a professional football club from Kosovo which competes in the Second League. The club is based in Gjakovë. Their home ground is the Gjakova City Stadium which has a seating capacity of 6,000.

== History ==
KF Gjakova was founded in 1961 as KF Emin Duraku named after Emin Duraku. It was later renamed to KF Gjakova.

== See also ==
- List of football clubs in Kosovo
