= Yonis Farah =

Somali footballer

Personal information
- Full name: Yonis Abdirizak Farah
- Date of birth: 4 September 1999 (age 27)
- Place of birth: London, England
- Height: 1.75 m (5 ft 9 in)
- Position: Left back

Team information
- Current team: Prizreni

Youth career
- –2018: Southend United

Senior career*
Years	Team	Apps	(Gls)
2018	Leatherhead	3	(0)
2019	Trysil FK	19	(1)
2020	Ytterhogdals	12	(1)
2021–2022	Eskilstuna City	11	(0)
2023	Banbury United	1	(0)
2023	Arlesey Town	1	(0)
2024	Kingstonian	4	(0)
2024	Beaconsfield Town	6	(0)
2025	Mitrovica		
2025–	Prizreni		

International career^{‡}
2019–	Somalia	11	(0)
- * Club domestic league appearances and goals as of 14:22, 5 February 2025 (UTC) ‡ National team caps and goals as of 15:54, 5 February 2026 (UTC)

Yonis Abdirizak Farah (Somali: Yonis Cabdirisaaq Faarax; born 4 September 1999) is a professional footballer who plays as a left back for Prizreni. Born in England, he represents the Somalia national team.

== Club career ==
Farah played youth football for English club Southend United, before being released in May 2018. In 2019, Farah signed for Norwegian club Trysil FK. Ahead of the 2020 season, Farah joined Swedish Division 2 side Ytterhogdals, making his debut on 28 June against Piteå.

On 28 July 2021, Farah returned to Sweden to join Division 2 side Eskilstuna City.

In July 2023, Farah returned to England, joining National League North club Banbury United. Following a short spell with Arlesey Town, he joined Kingstonian in March 2024.

In February 2025, after a spell with Beaconsfield Town, Farah joined First Football League of Kosovo side Mitrovica. In August 2025, he joined league rivals Prizreni.

== International career ==
On 5 September 2019, Farah made his debut for Somalia in a 1–0 win against Zimbabwe, marking Somalia's first ever FIFA World Cup qualification victory.

== Personal life ==
Farah has been described as a cousin of Olympic gold medallist Mo Farah. Yonis Farah's father, Abdirizak, is currently chairman of Somali First Division club Elman.
