= KF Lipjani =

Football club in Kosovo

- Full name: Klub Futbollistik Lipjani
- Founded: 2018; 7 years ago
- Ground: Sami Kelmendi Stadium
- Capacity: 2,500

KF Lipjani (Albanian: Klubi Futbollistik Lipjani) is a professional football club from Kosovo which competes in the Third League (Group B). The club is based in Lipjan. Their home ground is the Sami Kelmendi Stadium which has a seating capacity of 2,500.

== See also ==
- List of football clubs in Kosovo
