= 1968 Albanian National Championship =

Albanian National Championship
- Season: 1968
- Champions: 17 Nëntori; 9th Albanian title
- Relegated: Tomori; Ylli i Kuq
- European Cup: 17 Nëntori
- Cup Winners' Cup: Partizani
- Matches: 182
- Goals: 488 (2.68 per match)
- Top goalscorer: Skënder Hyka (19 goals)

The 1968 Albanian National Championship was the 30th season of the Albanian National Championship, the top professional league for association football clubs, since its establishment in 1930.

== Overview ==
It was contested by 14 teams, and 17 Nëntori won the championship.

== League table ==
Pos	Team	Pld	W	D	L	GF	GA	GR	Pts	Qualification or relegation
1	17 Nëntori (C)	26	21	3	2	63	20	3.150	45	Qualification for the European Cup first round
2	Partizani	26	19	6	1	62	19	3.263	44	Qualification for the Cup Winners' Cup first round
3	Dinamo Tirana	26	18	2	6	68	28	2.429	38	
4	Vllaznia	26	14	6	6	43	23	1.870	34	
5	Flamurtari	26	9	7	10	35	34	1.029	25	
6	Labinoti	26	9	5	12	37	44	0.841	23	
7	Lokomotiva Durrës	26	7	9	10	22	31	0.710	23	
8	Skënderbeu	26	6	9	11	27	32	0.844	21	
9	Traktori	26	8	5	13	28	40	0.700	21	
10	Luftëtari	26	7	7	12	22	51	0.431	21	
11	Besa	26	6	8	12	19	25	0.760	20	
12	Apolonia	26	4	11	11	24	40	0.600	19	
13	Tomori (R)	26	6	6	14	19	42	0.452	18	Relegation to the 1969–70 Kategoria e Dytë
14	Ylli i Kuq (R)	26	4	4	18	19	59	0.322	12	Relegation to the 1969–70 Kategoria e Dytë

Source: RSSSF.org
(C) Champions; (R) Relegated

Note: '17 Nëntori' is Tirana, 'Labinoti' is Elbasani, 'Lokomotiva Durrës' is Teuta, 'Traktori' is Lushnja, 'Ylli i Kuq' is Pogradeci

== Results ==
Home \ Away	17N	APO	BES	DIN	FLA	LAB	LOK	LUF	PAR	SKË	TOM	TRA	VLL	YLL
17 Nëntori		1–1	2–1	2–1	3–1	8–1	2–1	4–0	2–0	3–0	4–0	1–1	1–2	5–1
Apolonia	0–2		1–0	1–4	1–0	2–1	1–1	3–3	1–2	1–1	1–1	1–0	3–3	1–1
Besa	0–2	1–0		1–0	2–1	1–0	0–0	1–1	0–2	0–0	0–0	2–1	1–1	6–0
Dinamo	1–2	4–0	2–0		1–0	4–3	3–0	9–0	2–4	2–0	6–1	3–0	2–1	4–2
Flamurtari	1–2	1–1	1–0	5–3		3–2	2–2	3–0	0–0	1–0	2–0	2–0	1–2	2–0
Labinoti	2–1	1–1	1–0	0–2	2–1		1–0	3–0	1–2	2–1	0–0	5–1	2–4	4–0
Lokomotiva	0–1	1–0	1–0	0–3	2–2	0–0		2–1	0–1	1–1	3–1	3–0	1–0	2–1
Luftëtari	2–4	1–0	1–0	0–0	1–0	2–1	1–1		0–6	2–0	0–1	1–0	1–2	0–0
Partizani	1–1	2–2	3–2	2–1	3–0	4–1	0–0	3–0		2–0	2–0	2–2	1–0	3–1
Skënderbeu	2–3	0–0	1–1	1–1	1–1	1–1	3–1	1–1	0–2		2–0	0–1	2–0	4–2
Tomori	0–1	3–0	0–0	2–4	1–1	1–0	3–0	1–0	0–7	0–2		2–1	0–0	1–0
Traktori	1–2	3–2	3–0	1–3	1–1	0–1	2–0	1–1	1–2	2–1	1–0		0–0	3–1
Vllaznia	0–1	2–0	0–0	0–1	4–2	3–0	2–0	4–1	2–2	1–0	1–0	3–0		5–1
Ylli i Kuq	0–3	1–0	1–0	0–2	0–1	2–2	0–0	1–0	0–4	1–3	2–1	1–2	0–1	

Source: CalcioMondialeWeb.it
Legend: Blue = home team win; Yellow = draw; Red = away team win.
