= 2026–27 FC Ballkani season =

FC Ballkani
2026–27 season
- Manager: Mislav Karoglan
- Football Superleague of Kosovo: Pre-season
- Kosovar Cup: Pre-season
- UEFA Conference League: First qualifying round

The 2026–27 season is the 80th season in the history of Football Club Ballkani. The club will participate in the Kosovo Football League, the Kosovar Cup, and the UEFA Conference League, with competitive play commencing with European competition on 8 July.

== Transfers ==
=== In ===
Pos.	Player	Transferred from	Fee	Date	Source
MF	(Montenegro) Edvin Kuč	(Azerbaijan) Neftçi PFK		1 July 2026	

=== Out ===
Pos.	Player	Transferred to	Fee	Date	Source
MF	(Kosovo) Almir Kryeziu	(North Macedonia) Shkëndija	End of contract	1 July 2026	
MF	(Bulgaria) Stanislav Hristov Petkov			1 July 2026	

== Pre-season and friendlies ==
24 June 2026 Friendly	Hebar Pazardzhik (Bulgaria)	0–1	(Kosovo) Ballkani
18:00 UTC+2			Zekaj 90+1'

26 June 2026 Friendly	Lokomotiv Sofia (Bulgaria)	v	(Kosovo) Ballkani
14:00 UTC+2

27 June 2026 Friendly	Botev Plovdiv (Bulgaria)	2–0	(Kosovo) Ballkani
19:00 UTC+2	8'; 50'

2 July 2026 Friendly	Sileks (North Macedonia)	4–0	(Kosovo) Ballkani
17:00

== Competitions ==
Competition	First match	Last match	Starting round	Record							
Competition	First match	Last match	Starting round	Pld	W	D	L	GF	GA	GD	Win %
Football Superleague of Kosovo			Matchday 1	0	0	0	0	0	0	+0	—
Kosovar Cup				0	0	0	0	0	0	+0	—
UEFA Conference League	8 July 2026		First qualifying round	1	0	1	0	0	0	+0	0.00
Total				1	0	1	0	0	0	+0	0.00

Last updated: 9 July 2026
Source: Competitions

=== Football Superleague of Kosovo ===
==== Results summary ====
Overall								Home						Away					
Pld	W	D	L	GF	GA	GD	Pts	W	D	L	GF	GA	GD	W	D	L	GF	GA	GD
0	0	0	0	0	0	0	0	0	0	0	0	0	0	0	0	0	0	0	0

=== UEFA Conference League ===
==== First qualifying round ====
8 July 2026 First leg	Connah's Quay Nomads (Wales)	0-0	(Kosovo) Ballkani	Colwyn Bay, Wales
18:30 UTC+1				Stadium: Llanelian Road; Referee: Johann Ingi Jonsson (Iceland)

16 July 2026 Second leg	Ballkani (Kosovo)	v	(Wales) Connah's Quay Nomads
20:00 UTC+2
