= KF Dukagjini Gjakovë =

Football club in Kosovo

- Full name: Klub Futbollistik Dukagjini Gjakovë
- Founded: 1975; 50 years ago
- Ground: Gjakova City Stadium
- Capacity: 6,000
- League: Kosovo Third League

KF Dukagjini Gjakovë (Albanian: Klubi Futbollistik Dukagjini Gjakovë) is a professional football club from Kosovo which competes in the Second League. The club is based in Gjakovë. Their home ground is the Gjakova City Stadium which has a seating capacity of 6,000.
