= Ferki Aliu Stadium =

Coordinates: 42.818820°N 20.974744°E

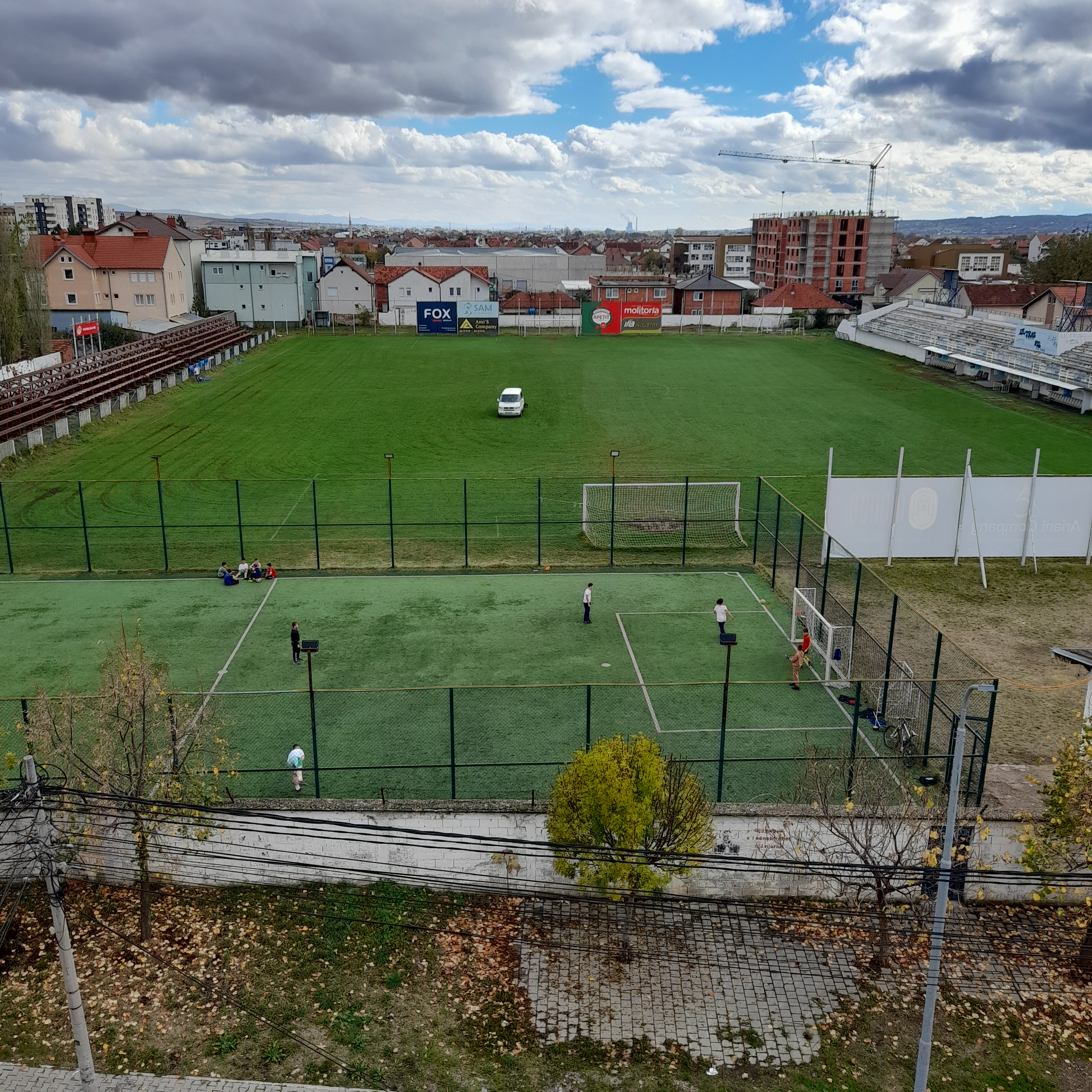
Stadiumi i Vushtrrisë

Ferki Aliu Stadium (Albanian: Stadiumi Ferki Aliu), is a multi-purpose stadium in Vushtrri, Kosovo. It is currently used mostly for football matches and is the home ground of KF Vushtrria, which competes in the First Football League of Kosovo.

== History and naming ==
The stadium is named after Ferki Aliu, a local resident and former player. Following the Kosovo War, many sports facilities in the region were renamed to in honor of local residents.

== Infrastructure ==
The stadium has a seating capacity of approximately 6,000 spectators. The stadium is primarily a football venue; however it has undergone several renovations to meet the licensing criteria set by the Football Federation of Kosovo. The main stands features a covered seating area for VIPs and media. The pitch is natural grass. Training facilities for the club's youth academy are located in the surrounding areas.

== Significant events ==
The stadium was the site of major celebrations in 2014, when KF Vushtrria (then known as FC Llamkos Kosova) won their first Kosovar Superleague title. During this period, the stadium recorded some of its highest attendance figures as the city rallied behind the team.

More recently, the Kosovan Ministry of Culture, Youth and Sports has invested in the stadium's lighting and drainage systems to allow for evening matches and better playing conditions during the winter months.
