= KF Minatori =

Association football club in Kosovo

- Full name: Klub Futbollistik Minatori
- Founded: 1946; 79 years ago
- Ground: Minatori Stadium
- Capacity: 500
- League: Kosovo Second League
- 2022–23: Kosovo Third League – Kosovo Plain's Group B, 3rd of 10

KF Minatori (Albanian: Klubi Futbollistik Minatori) is a professional football club from Kosovo which competes in the Third League. The club is based in Magure, Lipjan. Their home ground is the Minatori Stadium which has a seating capacity of 500.

== Notable players ==
- (Kosovo) Bekim Maliqi
- (Kosovo) Albion Rrahmani

== See also ==
- List of football clubs in Kosovo
