= Gjonaj =

Gjonaj is an Albanian surname. Notable people with the surname include:

- Adriana Gjonaj, Albanian politician
- Algert Gjonaj (born 1987), Albanian basketball player
- Etilda Gjonaj (born 1981), Albanian politician
- Kujtim Gjonaj (1946–2021), Albanian screenwriter
- Mark Gjonaj, American politician
- Salvador Gjonaj (born 1992), Albanian footballer

It is also a geological name:

- Gjonaj, Prizren, village in Kosovo

== See also ==
- Gjoni
