= KF United Boys Gjakova =

Football club in Kosovo

- Full name: Klub Futbollistik United Boys Gjakova
- Founded: 2019; 6 years ago
- Ground: Gjakovë Sports Complex
- Capacity: 3,000
- League: Liga e Tretë (Group A)

KF United Boys Gjakova (Albanian: Klubi Futbollistik United Boys Gjakova) is a professional football club from Kosovo which competes in the Third League (Group A). The club is based in Gjakovë. Their home ground is the Gjakovë Sports Complex which has a viewing capacity of 3,000.

== See also ==
- List of football clubs in Kosovo
