= KF Kastrioti Ferizaj =

Football club in Kosovo

- Full name: Klub Futbollistik Kastrioti Ferizaj
- Founded: 1997; 28 years ago
- Ground: Ferizaj Sports Complex
- Capacity: 1,000

KF Kastrioti Ferizaj (Albanian: Klubi Futbollistik Kastrioti Ferizaj) is a professional football club from Kosovo which competes in the Third League (Group B). The club is based in Ferizaj. Their home ground is the Ferizaj Sports Complex which has a viewing capacity of 1,000.

== See also ==
- List of football clubs in Kosovo
