= Bujar Pllana =

Albanian footballer

Personal information
- Date of birth: 29 October 2001 (age 25)
- Place of birth: Mitrovica, Kosovo under UN administration
- Height: 1.90 m (6 ft 3 in)
- Positions: Centre-back; right-back

Team information
- Current team: Grasshopper
- Number: 44

Youth career
- –2019: Australia
- 2019–2020: Trepça '89

Senior career*
Years	Team	Apps	(Gls)
2020–2022	Feronikeli	35	(0)
2022–2023	Prishtina	40	(4)
2023–2024	Slaven Belupo	18	(1)
2024–2026	Lechia Gdańsk	44	(2)
2026–	Grasshopper	11	(1)

International career^{‡}
2019	Kosovo U19	4	(0)
2021	Kosovo U21	3	(0)
2026–	Albania	2	(0)
- * Club domestic league appearances and goals as of 21 November 2026 ‡ National team caps and goals as of 6 June 2026

Bujar Pllana (born 29 October 2001) is a professional footballer who plays as a centre-back for Swiss Super League club Grasshopper. Born in Kosovo under United Nations administration, he plays for the Albania national team.

He spent part of his youth career in Australia before joining the youth team of Trepça '89 in 2019. He later played for Feronikeli and Prishtina in the Kosovo Superleague. In 2023, he moved abroad to join Slaven Belupo in the Croatian League, before transferring to Lechia Gdańsk in 2024. In August 2026, he signed with Swiss club Grasshopper.

At international level, Pllana represented Kosovo at under-19 and under-21 levels, but in 2026 he switched to play for the Albania national team at senior level.

== Club career ==
=== Early career ===
Pllana began his youth career at Australia Mitrovicë, where he remained until 2019. He then joined Trepça '89 for the 2019–20 season.

On 8 September 2020, Pllana signed with Feronikeli. He made 35 appearances for the club before joining Prishtina on 19 January 2022. During the 2022–23 season, he helped Prishtina win the Kosovar Cup, scoring four goals in 28 appearances across all competitions.

=== Slaven Belupo ===
On 26 June 2023, Pllana joined Croatian League club Slaven Belupo on a three-year contract. After initially struggling to break into the first team, he made his debut on 4 December, coming on as a late substitute in a 2–0 defeat against Dinamo Zagreb. He made his first start six days later in a 4–2 away win over Rijeka and subsequently established himself in the starting line-up.

On 2 March 2024, Pllana scored his first goal for the club, heading in the equaliser in a 3–2 defeat against Lokomotiva Zagreb, although he conceded a penalty later in the match. Ahead of the following match against Dinamo Zagreb, he described himself as ready to play in any position. He finished the 2023–24 Croatian Football League season with 17 league appearances, 16 starts and one goal, as Slaven Belupo finished ninth, second from bottom, retaining their top-flight status. He made 18 appearances in all competitions for Slaven Belupo before joining Lechia Gdańsk in August 2024.

=== Lechia Gdańsk ===
On 9 August 2024, Pllana signed a four-year contract with Polish Ekstraklasa club Lechia Gdańsk. He made his debut seven days later, starting in a 4–1 away defeat against Puszcza Niepołomice.

Despite the difficult start, Pllana established himself as a regular in the starting line-up. He scored his first league goal for Lechia in a 2–1 defeat against Cracovia in November 2024 and provided three assists during the season, including in victories over Jagiellonia Białystok and Korona Kielce. He made 27 league appearances during the 2024–25 Ekstraklasa season, starting 26 matches, as Lechia finished 14th in the league.

During the 2025–26 season, Pllana made 17 league appearances, 13 as a starter, and scored once. On 21 March 2026, he scored his first goal of the season in a 2–1 victory over Pogoń Szczecin, opening the scoring in the 11th minute. In March 2026, following the approval of his change of international allegiance from Kosovo to Albania, Pllana received his first call-up to the Albania national team for the 2026 FIFA World Cup qualifying play-offs.

=== Grasshopper ===
On 12 August 2026, Pllana joined Grasshopper of the Swiss Super League, signing a contract until the end of the 2027–28 season. He made his debut three days later in a 5–0 Swiss Cup victory over Regensdorf. On 5 September, he scored his first goal for the club with a 96th-minute equaliser in a 2–2 draw against Zürich in the Zürich derby.

== International career ==
Between 2019 and 2021, Pllana represented Kosovo at youth international level, playing for the under-19 and under-21 teams, for which he made seven appearances in total.

In February 2026, reports emerged that Pllana could switch his international allegiance to the Albania national team. He obtained Albanian citizenship through a presidential decree on 20 February 2026. On 10 March, FIFA approved his change of association from Kosovo to Albania, making him eligible to represent the latter.

On 21 March 2026, Pllana received his first call-up to the senior Albania team for the 2026 World Cup qualification play-offs. Coach Sylvinho stated that Pllana had been monitored for around six months and that his experience in the Polish league had informed his selection. Pllana was an unused substitute in Albania's 2–1 defeat in play-offs, but made his debut five days later, starting in a 1–0 friendly defeat to Ukraine. He made his second appearance on 6 June under coach Rolando Maran, playing the first half of a 1–0 friendly defeat to Luxembourg.

== Personal life ==
Pllana was born in Mitrovica, Kosovo under UN administration and is the younger brother of former Kosovo under-21 international Leonard Pllana.

== Career statistics ==
=== International ===
As of match played 6 June 2026

Appearances and goals by national team and year
National team	Year	Apps	Goals
Albania
Albania	2026	2	0
Total		2	0

== Honours ==
Prishtina

- Kosovar Cup: 2022–23
