= Agim Ademi =

Kosovan football administrator (born 1961)

President of Football Federation of Kosovo
- Incumbent
- Assumed office 6 July 2018
- Vice President: Bakir Burri; Agim Dibrani
- Preceded by: Fadil Vokrri

Vice-president of Football Federation of Kosovo
- In office 2004 – 6 July 2018 Serving with Haki Demolli (until 2008), Bekim Haxhiu (2008–2016) and Predrag Jović (2008–2018)
- President: Sabri Hashani; Fadil Vokrri
- Preceded by: Adem Çollakaj; Afërdita Fazlija
- Succeeded by: Bakir Burri; Agim Dibrani

Personal details
- Born: Agim Ademi; 19 October 1961 (age 65) Pristina, PR Serbia, FPR Yugoslavia (modern Kosovo)
- Children: Capital T
- Occupation: Footballer; Football administrator
Association football career
Senior career*
Years	Team	Apps	(Gls)
1975–1988	Kosova Prishtinë		
- * Club domestic league appearances and goals

Agim Ademi (born 19 October 1961) is a Kosovan football administrator and former player who is the current president of the Football Federation of Kosovo from 6 July 2018.

== Life and career ==
Agim Ademi was born on 19 October 1961 into an Albanian family in the city of Pristina, Kosovo, at the time part of the Yugoslavia. His son, Trim Ademi known as Capital T, is a rapper, singer, songwriter, philanthropist and former football player. He has a master's degree in Security and Emergency Sciences, and is known as a successful businessman in the field of construction, hospitality and manufacturing.

From 1975 to 1988, he was an active footballer, while from 1992 to 2000, Ademi gave his contribution to the development of Kosovar football as chairman and donor of Kosova Prishtinë, a club which in a period had a successful appearance in the elite of Kosovar football. From 2004 until 6 July 2018, he gave his contribution as vice-president of Football Federation of Kosovo. On 6 July 2018, Ademi is voted unanimously by 58 delegates in the Football Federation of Kosovo's Extraordinary Electoral Assembly and is elected president of the Football Federation of Kosovo for a four-year term (2018–2022) as the position of president had remained vacant after the death of Fadil Vokrri.
