= KF Dejni =

Football club in Kosovo

- Full name: Klub Futbollistik Dejni
- Founded: 2000; 25 years ago
- Ground: Rahovec Sports Field
- Capacity: 500

KF Dejni (Albanian: Klubi Futbollistik Dejni) is a professional football club from Kosovo which competes in the Third League (Group A). The club is based in Rahovec. Their home ground is the Dejni Sports Field which has a viewing capacity of 500.
