= KF Pashtriku =

Football club in Kosovo

- Full name: Klubi i Futbollit Pashtriku
- Nickname: KFPR
- Founded: 1958; 67 years ago
- Ground: Rogovë Sports Field
- Capacity: 500
- President: Agron Shala
- Manager: Valmir Gashi
- League: Kosovo Third League
- 2020/2021: 2nd

KF Pashtriku (Albanian: Klubi i Futbollit Pashtriku) is a professional football club from Kosovo which competes in the Third League (Group A). The club is based in Rogovë, Gjakovë. Their home ground is the Rogovë Sports Field which has a viewing capacity of 500.

== See also ==
- List of football clubs in Kosovo
