= KF Kosovari =

Football club in Kosovo

- Full name: Klub Futbollistik Kosovari
- Founded: 17 August 2011; 14 years ago
- Ground: Zejnel Salihu Field
- Capacity: 500
- League: Kosovo Third League

KF Kosovari (Albanian: Klubi Futbollistik Kosovari) is a professional football club from Kosovo which competes in the Third League (Group B). The club is based in Bardh i Madh, Fushë Kosovë. Their home ground is the Zejnel Salihu Field which has a viewing capacity of 500.

== See also ==
- List of football clubs in Kosovo
