= KF Shqiponja =

Football club in Kosovo

- Full name: Klub Futbollistik Shqiponja Pejë
- Nickname: Dardanët (Dardanians)
- Founded: 1999; 27 years ago
- Ground: Stadiumi Shahin Haxhiislami
- Capacity: 10,000
- Manager: Faton Demiri
| Home colours | Away colours |

Klubi Futbollistik Shqiponja Pejë is a professional football club from Peja, Kosovo. The club was founded in 1999 and competes in the Third League (Group B).

== History ==
The club played in the Superleague of Kosovo in the 2007–08 season but relegated after finishing on the 15th place.

== Notable players ==
- (Montenegro) Fatos Beqiraj
