= KF Xërxa =

Football club in Kosovo

- Full name: Klub Futbollistik Xërxa
- Founded: 1978; 48 years ago
- Ground: Xërxa Sports Complex
- Capacity: 1,000
- League: Kosovo Third League

KF Xërxa (Albanian: Klubi Futbollistik Xërxa) is a professional football club from Kosovo which competes in the Third League (Group A). The club is based in Rahovec. Their home ground is the Xërxa Sports Complex which has a viewing capacity of 1,000.

== Notable players ==
- (Kosovo) Almir Kryeziu

== See also ==
- List of football clubs in Kosovo
