= KF Vëllazëria =

Football club in Kosovo

KF Vëllazëria Zhur
- Full name: Klubi Futbollistik Vëllazëria Zhur
- Founded: 1968; 57 years ago
- Ground: Zhur Stadium
- Capacity: 2,500

KF Vëllazëria Zhur (Albanian: Klubi Futbollistik Vëllazëria Zhur) is a professional football club from Kosovo which competes in the Second League. The club is based in Zhur. Their home ground is the Zhur Stadium which has a seating capacity of 2,500.

== See also ==
- List of football clubs in Kosovo
