= FC Mitrovica =

Football club in Kosovo

- Full name: Klubi Futbollistik Mitrovica
- Nickname: Australianët (The Australians)
- Founded: 20 June 2011; 14 years ago as KF Australia; 23 May 2023; 3 years ago as FC Mitrovica
- Ground: Stadiumi "Xhevat Jusufi"
- Capacity: 1,000
- President: Jeton Ujkani
- Manager: Nazmi Rama
- League: First Football League of Kosovo
Home colours

FC Mitrovica (previously known as Australia) is a professional football club from Mitrovica, Kosovo which competes in the First League. The home games are played in the Xhevat Jusufi Stadium in Mitrovicë which has a capacity for 1,000 people.

== History ==
KF Australia Mitrovicë was founded by Jeton Ujkani on 20 June 2011. The club was named after the country Australia. Australia won the Third League after winning on penalties against Opoja and was promoted to the Second League. On 23 May 2023, the club name was officially changed to FC Mitrovica with the aim to gain more support.

== Honours ==
- Third League
  - Winners (1): 2022

== Notable players ==
- (Albania) Bujar Pllana
- (Kosovo) Kushtrim Fazliu
- (Kosovo) Baton Zabërgja
- (Kosovo) Enis Zabërgja
- (Somalia) Yonis Farah
- (South Africa) Tyroane Sandows
- (United Kingdom) Suleiman Bolatsa Bakalandwa

== See also ==
- List of football clubs in Kosovo
