= 1969–70 Kategoria e Dytë =

Kategoria e Dytë
- Season: 1969–70
- Champions: Tomori
- Promoted: Tomori; Besëlidhja
- Relegated: None

The 1969–70 Kategoria e Dytë was the 24th season of a second-tier association football league in Albania.

== Group A ==
Pos	Team	Pld	W	D	L	GF	GA	GD	Pts	Promotion
1	Besëlidhja (P)	22	15	7	0	51	9	+42	37	Promotion to 1970–71 National Championship
2	Studenti	22	16	4	2	55	19	+36	36	
3	Ylli i Kuq	22	13	3	6	42	26	+16	29	
4	Korabi	22	12	2	8	42	27	+15	26	
5	Përparimi	22	10	4	8	36	33	+3	24	
6	Sopoti	22	7	6	9	28	38	−10	20	
7	31 Korriku	22	7	6	9	37	36	+1	20	
8	10 Korriku	22	8	4	10	34	40	−6	20	
9	8 Nëntori	22	6	5	11	26	36	−10	17	
10	Tërbuni	22	5	4	13	22	38	−16	14	
11	Valbona	22	4	3	15	18	46	−28	11	
12	Minatori (Rr)	22	3	3	16	11	54	−43	9	

(P) Promoted

== Group B ==
Pos	Team	Pld	W	D	L	GF	GA	GD	Pts	Promotion
1	Tomori (C, P)	24	19	4	1	51	12	+39	42	Promotion to 1970–71 National Championship
2	Erzeni	24	15	4	5	41	15	+26	34	
3	Punëtori	24	13	6	5	36	21	+15	32	
4	Gramozi	24	9	8	7	30	25	+5	26	
5	5 Shtatori	24	10	6	8	26	26	0	26	
6	Dajti	24	8	9	7	31	28	+3	25	
7	Butrinti	24	7	10	7	34	30	+4	24	
8	22 Tetori	24	9	5	10	34	30	+4	23	
9	Shkumbini	24	7	8	9	30	35	−5	22	
10	Bistrica	24	5	9	10	15	26	−11	19	
11	Kastrioti	24	4	7	13	18	32	−14	15	
12	Minatori (T)	24	3	7	14	17	52	−35	13	
13	24 Maji	24	3	5	16	17	48	−31	11	

(C) Champions; (P) Promoted

== Championship final ==
Team 1	Score	Team 2
Tomori	3–1	Besëlidhja
