= Almir Kryeziu =

Kosovar professional footballer (born 1998)

Personal information
- Full name: Almir Kryeziu
- Date of birth: 14 December 1998 (age 27)
- Place of birth: Xërxë, FR Yugoslavia
- Height: 1.72 m (5 ft 8 in)
- Position: Left winger

Team information
- Current team: Shkëndija
- Number: 10

Youth career
- 2007–2016: Liria Prizren

Senior career*
Years	Team	Apps	(Gls)
2016–2017	Liria Prizren	0	(0)
2016–2017	→ Rahoveci (loan)		
2017	Xërxa		
2017–2021	Arbëria	36	(5)
2021–2023	Drita	57	(5)
2023–2026	Ballkani	88	(22)
2026–	Shkëndija	8	(1)

International career^{‡}
2020	Kosovo U21	2	(0)
- * Club domestic league appearances and goals as of 24 September 2026 ‡ National team caps and goals as of 17 November 2020

Almir Kryeziu (born 14 December 1998) is a Kosovar professional footballer who plays as a left-winger for Shkëndija.

== Club career ==
=== Rahoveci ===
Kryeziu started his professional career with Rahoveci where he was loaned from Liria Prizren which was his youth club.

=== Arbëria ===
Kryeziu signed for Arbëria in 2017 in the Kosovo Superleague after good performances with his hometown club Xërxa.

=== Drita ===
Kryeziu was transferred to Drita in the summer of 2021. He debuted in the Super League of Kosovo, his opponent was Feronikeli, where Drita won with a score of 2-1

=== Ballkani ===
On 1 July 2023. Kryeziu was transferred to the Kosovo Super League club Ballkani, a month later he made his debut with Ballkani against Liria.

=== Shkëndija ===
After scoring 14 goals and making 16 assists in all competitions in the 2025-26 season with Ballkani, Kryeziu departed Suhareka as a free agent and signed a two-year contract with North Macedonian side KF Shkëndija on 29 June 2026. He scored his first goal for his new club in his debut in a UEFA Conference League game against Europa F.C. in Gibraltar on 9 July 2026.

== International career ==
Kryeziu has played a total of 2 times for the Kosovo National Team in the qualifiers for the U-21 UEFA European Championship. Kryeziu has been selected for the Kosovo National Team in the 2020 season.
