= KF Korenica =

Football club in Kosovo

- Full name: Klub Futbollistik Korenica
- Founded: 2019; 6 years ago
- Ground: Shkugëz Sports Field
- Capacity: 500
- League: Kosovo Third League

KF Korenica (Albanian: Klubi Futbollistik Korenica) is a professional football club from Kosovo which competes in the Third League (Group A). The club is based in Shkugëz, Gjakovë. Their home ground is the Shkugëz Sports Field which has a viewing capacity of 500.

== See also ==
- List of football clubs in Kosovo
