= KF Lidhja e Prizrenit =

Football club in Kosovo

- Full name: Klub Futbollistik Lidhja e Prizrenit
- Founded: 2011; 14 years ago
- Ground: Prizren Sports Complex
- Capacity: 2,500

KF Lidhja e Prizrenit (Albanian: Klubi Futbollistik Lidhja e Prizrenit) is a professional football club from Kosovo which competes in the Third League (Group A). The club is based in Prizren. Their home ground is the Prizren Sports Complex which has a viewing capacity of 2,500.

== See also ==
- List of football clubs in Kosovo
