= KF Runiku =

Football club in Kosovo

KF Runik
- Full name: Klub Futbollistik Përparimi Runik
- Founded: 2000; 25 years ago
- Ground: Runik Sports Field
- Capacity: 500

KF Runiku (Albanian: Klubi Futbollistik Runiku) is a professional football club from Kosovo which competes in the Third League (Group B). The club is based in Runik, Skënderaj. Their home ground is the Runik Sports Field which has a viewing capacity of 500.

== See also ==
- List of football clubs in Kosovo
