= Ardit Tahiri =

Kosovan footballer (born 2002)

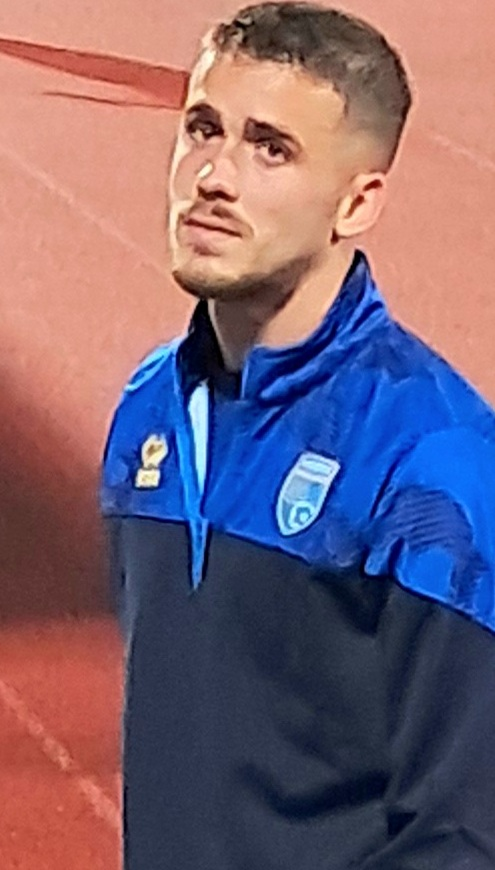
- Tahiri with Kosovo U21 in 2024

Personal information
- Date of birth: 6 October 2002 (age 24)
- Place of birth: Vushtrri, Kosovo under UN administration
- Height: 1.87 m (6 ft 2 in)
- Position: Centre-forward

Team information
- Current team: Kolos Kovalivka
- Number: 11

Youth career
- 2011–2014: Liria Milloshevë
- 2014–2020: 2 Korriku

Senior career*
Years	Team	Apps	(Gls)
2020–2021	Besa Pejë	30	(9)
2021–2024	Drita	81	(16)
2024	Dinamo City	7	(1)
2024–2026	Llapi	34	(16)
2025	→ HJK (loan)	7	(0)
2026–	Kolos Kovalivka	13	(2)

International career^{‡}
2020	Kosovo U19	2	(0)
2021–2024	Kosovo U21	18	(3)
- * Club domestic league appearances and goals as of 3 June 2026 ‡ National team caps and goals as of 11 October 2024

Ardit Tahiri (born 6 October 2002) is a Kosovan professional footballer who plays as a centre-forward for Ukrainian Premier League club Kolos Kovalivka.

== Club career ==
=== Early career / Besa Pejë ===
Tahiri started playing football at the age of 9 with Liria Milloshevë, where after three years he transferred to 2 Korriku, one of the clubs in the capital of Kosovo. On 18 September 2020, he joined Kosovo Superleague side Besa Pejë. His debut with Besa Pejë came a day later against Ballkani after being named in the starting line-up.

=== Drita ===
On 14 August 2021, Tahiri signed a three-year contract with Kosovo Superleague club Drita. His debut with Drita came seven days later against Feronikeli after coming on as a substitute at 66th minute in place of Erjon Vucaj and scored his side's goals during a 2–1 home win.

=== Dinamo City ===
On 15 January 2024, Tahiri joined Kategoria Superiore side Dinamo City. His debut with Dinamo City came nine days later in the 2023–24 Albanian Cup round of 16 against Laçi after coming on as a substitute in the 73rd minute in place of Lorenco Vila.

=== Llapi ===
On 29 June 2024, Tahiri signed a three-year contract with Kosovo Superleague club Llapi. His debut with Llapi came nineteen days later in the 2024–25 UEFA Europa League first qualifying round against Wisła Kraków after coming on as a substitute in the 64th minute in place of Muhamed Useini and scored his side's only goal during a 1–2 home defeat.

==== Loan to HJK Helsinki ====
On 26 August 2025, Tahiri joined Veikkausliiga club HJK Helsinki on a loan deal for the remainder of the season for an initial €50,000 fee plus a €100,000 buy option.

== International career ==
=== Under-19 ===
On 20 January 2020, Tahiri received a call-up from Kosovo U19 for a three-day training camp in Pristina. On 16 February 2020, he was named as part of the Kosovo U19 squad for 2020 Roma Caput Mundi. His debut with Kosovo U19 came two days later in the 2020 Roma Caput Mundi match against Greece U19 after being named in the starting line-up.

=== Under-21 ===
On 24 August 2021, Tahiri received a call-up from Kosovo U21 for the 2021 UEFA European Under-21 Championship qualification match against England U21, and made his debut after coming on as a substitute in the 82nd minute in place of Kreshnik Krasniqi.

== Honours ==
HJK

- Finnish Cup: 2025

Kosovo U19

- Roma Caput Mundi: 2020

Individual

- Kosovo Superleague "Star of the Week" Award: 2021–22 (Round 3), 2024–25 (Round 28)
