= KF Rinia =

Football club in Kosovo

- Full name: Klub Futbollistik Rinia
- Founded: 1965; 60 years ago
- Ground: Rinia Sports Field
- Capacity: 500
- League: Kosovo Third League

KF Rinia (Albanian: Klubi Futbollistik Rinia) is a professional football club from Kosovo which competes in the Third League (Group B). The club is based in Miradi e Epërme, Fushë Kosovë. Their home ground is the Rinia Sports Field which has a viewing capacity of 500.

== See also ==
- List of football clubs in Kosovo
