= KF Besa Irzniq =

Football club in Kosovo

- Full name: Klub Futbollistik Besa Irzniq
- Founded: 2010; 15 years ago
- Ground: Irzniq Sports Field
- Capacity: 500
- League: Kosovo Third League

KF Besa Irzniq (Albanian: Klubi Futbollistik Besa Irzniq) is a professional football club from Kosovo which competes in the Third League (Group A). The club is based in Irzniq, Deçan. Their home ground is the Irzniq Sports Field which has a viewing capacity of 500.
