= KF Rilindja =

Football club in Kosovo

- Full name: Klub Futbollistik Rilindja
- Founded: 1995; 31 years ago
- Ground: Ibrahim Gashi Stadium
- Capacity: 1500
- League: Kosovo Second League
- 2024–25: Kosovo Second League, 12th of 16

KF Rilindja has a well known academy and is a club in Kosovo which competes in the Second Football League of Kosovo. The club is based in Prishtinë. It is also known for their development of youth players. Their home ground is the Ibrahim Gashi Stadium which has a seating capacity of 1,500.

The trophy cabinet of KF Rilindja is filled with medals and trophies that were hosted by the Football Federation of Kosovo. Ibrahim Gashi stadium is as old as the club. It was built during 1995–1996. Rilindja has good training grounds that help young players and talents improve and develop. Young players participate in the Kosovo's Youth League every year. Back in 2018, the 2005/2006 generations won the youth league by completely dominating on it. Klubi Futbollistik i Rilindja is a very successful club in terms of young generations. They also participate in the Veteran players' Division where older non-professional players can have a chance on playing competitively.

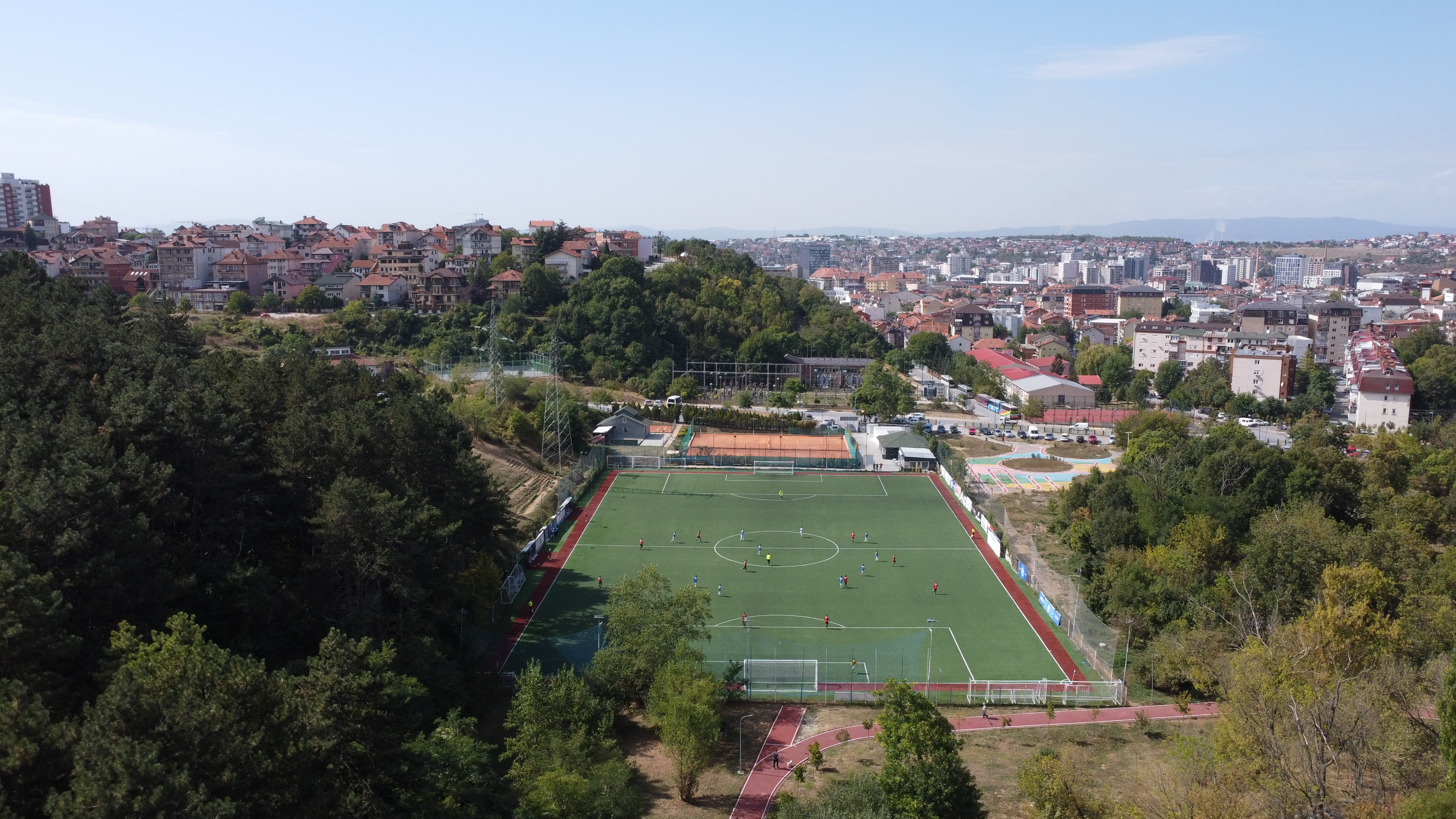
KF Rilindja football court

== See also ==
- List of football clubs in Kosovo
