= KF Dardanët =

Football club in Kosovo

- Full name: Klub Futbollistik Dardanët
- Founded: 1991; 34 years ago
- Ground: Gjakova City Stadium
- Capacity: 6,000
- League: Kosovo Second League
- 2022–23: Kosovo Second League, 12th of 16

KF Dardanët (Albanian: Klubi Futbollistik Dardanët) is a professional football club from Kosovo which competes in the Second League. The club is based in Gjakovë. Their home ground is the Gjakova City Stadium which has a seating capacity of 6,000.
