= KF Bashkimi Gjilan =

Football club in Kosovo

- Full name: Klub Futbollistik Bashkimi Gjilan
- Founded: 1941; 84 years ago
- Ground: Gjilan Sports Complex
- Capacity: 1,000
- League: Kosovo Third League

KF Bashkimi Gjilan (Albanian: Klubi Futbollistik Bashkim Gjilan) is a professional football club from Kosovo which competes in the Third League (Group B). The club is based in Gjilan. Their home ground is the Gjilan Sports Complex which has a viewing capacity of 1,000.
