= KF Rilindja e Kosovës =

Football club in Kosovo

- Full name: Klub Futbollistik Rilindja e Kosovës
- Founded: 2010; 15 years ago
- Ground: Skivjan Sports Field
- Capacity: 500

KF Rilindja e Kosovës (Albanian: Klubi Futbollistik Rilindja e Kosovës) is a football club from Kosovo which competes in the Third League (Group A). The club is based in Skivjan, Gjakovë. Their home ground is the Skivjan Sports Field which has a viewing capacity of 500.

== See also ==
- List of football clubs in Kosovo
