= KF Bashkimi Krushë e Madhe =

Football club in Kosovo

- Full name: Klub Futbollistik Bashkimi Krushë e Madhe
- Founded: 1959; 66 years ago
- Ground: Krushë e Madhe Sports Field
- Capacity: 500

KF Bashkimi Krushë e Madhe (Albanian: Klubi Futbollistik Bashkimi Krushë e Madhe) is a professional football club from Kosovo which competes in the Third League (Group A). The club is based in Krushë e Madhe, Rahovec. Their home ground is the Krushë e Madhe Sports Field which has a viewing capacity of 500.
