= KF Uniteti =

Football club in Kosovo

- Full name: Klubi Futbollistik Uniteti
- Founded: 1976; 49 years ago
- Ground: Viti Sports Complex
- Capacity: 1,000
- League: Kosovo Third League

KF Uniteti (Albanian: Klubi Futbollistik Uniteti) is a professional football club from Kosovo which competes in the Third League (Group B). The club is based in Sadovin e Jerlive [Viti]. Their home ground is the Viti Sports Complex which has a viewing capacity of 1,000.

== See also ==
- List of football clubs in Kosovo
