= Kujtim Gjonaj =

Albanian filmmaker (1946–2021)

Kujtim Gjonaj (3 November 1946 – 1 March 2021) was an Albanian screenwriter, director of documentary films and cartoons, producer and publisher. Gjonaj began his career as an editor of documentaries scenarios in the film studio "New Albania".

== Biography ==
Gjonaj is a descendant of members of the Gjoni (Gjonaj) clan. He started his career in 1969 in Kinostudio.

In 1974 he began his career as a director of film documentaries and as a writer creating scenes for multiple films. His feature film contributions include the script for the 1976 film Call, his first feature film, the 1977 films They Were Four and Circus in the Village and the 1979 movie Advisors. Gjonaj worked for Alba and later established his own film production house, "The Albanian World".

Gjonaj produced biographies of prominent figures such as Ali Pasha Tepelena, Faik Konitza, Jeronim de Rada, Naim, Mother Teresa and Sulejman Pitarka (People's Artist)).

A tribute to Gjonaj was commemorated during the Festival Cup XII of the Albanian Documentary Film Association in Tirana, Albania, in 2006.

On 16 July 2012, Gjonaj was awarded with the title "Grand Master" (Albanian: Mjeshtër i Madh) by the Albanian National Film Archive. (AQSHF).

== Filmography ==
=== Scenarios ===
- Këshilltarët, (1979)
- Ata ishin katër, (1977)
- Thirrja, (1976)

=== Directing ===
- Shëmbja e idhujve, (1995)
- Djemtë e Valiasit, (1984)
