= Runik =

Village in Kosovo

- Village
- Location in Kosovo
- Coordinates: 42°47′01″N 20°42′21″E
- Location: Kosovo
- District: Mitrovica
- Municipality: Skenderaj
- Elevation: 764 m (2,507 ft)

Population (2024)
  - Total: 1,137
- Time zone: UTC+1 (CET)
  - Summer (DST): UTC+2 (CEST)

Runik (Albanian definite form: Runiku) is a village in the Skenderaj municipality of Kosovo. It is located in the Drenica region and has 1,137 inhabitants as of 2024. The village has a football club, KF Përparimi Runik. Runik is the site of an important Neolithic settlement in Kosovo and the wider region. The excavated finds at the site include a baked-clay ocarina, one of the oldest musical instruments which have been in the Balkans and the oldest in Kosovo.

== History ==
In the Ottoman defters of 1455 and 1485 a village is mentioned with the name Runik and in 1485 the village had 31 households Names such as 'Radinha Arbanas', 'Nikolla, son of Arbanas' and 'Stepan, son of Lleshi' indicates an Albanian presence.

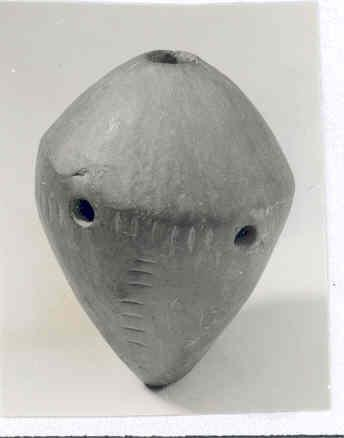
The Neolithic Runik Ocarina is the oldest musical instrument found in Kosovo to date.

It is located the Drenica region, about 25 kilometres (16 mi) southwest of Mitrovica and 10 kilometres (6.2 mi) northwest of Skenderaj (near the Skenderaj-Istog road). The site, one of the most prominent Neolithic sites in Kosovo to date, contains artefacts from the Starcevo, Cardial and Vinca cultures. As of 2020, the two oldest sites of Starcevo are Crkvina near Miokovci, runik Kosovo which are statistically indistinguishable to each other and have been dated to ca. 6238 BCE (6362-6098 BCE at 95% CI) and ca. 6185 BCE (6325–6088 BCE at 95% Cl) respectively.

It was excavated in 1966-68 and in 1984. Research was conducted in about 35 private parcels in the Dardania neighborhood of Runik. Starcevo and Vinca pottery fragments dating to 6500-3500 BC have been found at the site. A 10,000-square-metre (12,000 sq yd) magnetic survey was conducted at the site in March 2010, and the remains of huts reinforced with wooden joists have been found. Monochrome pottery decorated with red gloss, Cardium pottery, barbotine earthenware and ceramic pottery painted with linear and geometric designs have been found, along with anthropomorphic figurines and cult tables (small altars). Ornamental artifacts include a spiral baked-clay vase tinted with ocher, painted in dark colors and decorated as the palm of a hand. A significant find is a baked-clay ocarina 8 centimetres (3.1 in) in length, known as the Runik Ocarina, the oldest musical instrument found in Kosovo to date.

In the village lay also the ruins of the medieval church Shen Gjergj (Saint George).

== Bibliography ==
- Berisha, Milot (2012). "Archaeological Guide of Kosovo" (PDF). Ministry of Culture of Kosovo.
- Porčić, Marko; Blagojević, Tamara; Pendić, Jugoslav; Stefanović, Sofija (2020). "The timing and tempo of the Neolithic expansion across the Central Balkans in the light of the new radiocarbon evidence". Journal of Archaeological Science: Reports. 33 102528. doi:10.1016/j.jasrep.2020.102528.
