= KF Opoja =

Football club in Kosovo

- Full name: Klub Futbollistik Opoja
- Founded: 2010; 15 years ago
- Ground: Dragash Sports Complex
- Capacity: 1,000
- League: Kosovo Second League

KF Opoja (Albanian: Klubi Futbollistik Opoja) is a professional football club from Kosovo which competes in the Third League. The club is based in Dragash/Sharr. Their home ground was the Dragash Sports Complex which has a viewing capacity of 1,000. In 2024, Opoja relegated to the Third League. It was told the club will dissolve however they still compete in the Third League.

== See also ==
- List of football clubs in Kosovo
