= KF Bashkimi Koretin =

Football club in Kosovo

- Full name: Klub Futbollistik Bashkimi Koretin
- Founded: 1974; 52 years ago
- Ground: Koretin Stadium
- Capacity: 600
Home colours	Away colours

KF Bashkimi Koretin (Albanian: Klubi Futbollistik Bashkimi Koretin) is a professional football club from Kosovo which competes in the Second League. The club is based in Koretin. Their home ground is the Koretin Stadium which has a seating capacity of 600.

== Notable players ==
- (Kosovo) Altin Aliu
- (Kosovo) Albion Rrahmani
