= Bardh i Madh =

Bardh i Madh: Bardh i Madh (Albanian); Велики Белаћевац/Veliki Belaćevac (Serbian)
- Village
- Location within Kosovo
- Coordinates: 42.631540°N 21.022181°E
- Location: Kosovo
- District: Prishtinë
- Municipality: Fushë Kosovë

Population (2024)
  - Total: 2,434
- Time zone: UTC+1 (Central European Time)
  - Summer (DST): UTC+2 (CEST)

Bardh i Madh (Serbian: Велики Белаћевац/Veliki Belaćevac, Albanian: Bardh i Madh) is a village in the municipality of Fushë Kosovë, in Kosovo.

== Sports ==
Bardh i Madh is the home of the football club KF Kosovari and the basketball club KB Kosovari.
