= KF Vjosa =

Football club in Kosovo

- Full name: Klub Futbollistik Vjosa
- Founded: 1985; 40 years ago
- Ground: Shtime Sports Complex
- Capacity: 1,000
- Manager: Megzon Visoka
- League: Kosovo First League
- 2024–25: Kosovo First League – Group B, 8th of 10

KF Vjosa (Albanian: Klubi Futbollistik Vjosa) is a professional football club from Kosovo which competes in the First League. The club is based in Shtime. Their home ground is the Shtime Sports Complex which has a viewing capacity of 1,000.

== Honours ==
- Second League
  - Winners (1): 2022

== See also ==
- List of football clubs in Kosovo
