= Xërxë =

Xërxë: Xërxë (Albanian); Зрзе/Zrze (Serbian)
- Village
- Interactive map of Xërxë
- Coordinates: 42.348181°N 20.569335°E
- District: Gjakovë
- Municipality: Rahovec

Population (2024)
  - Total: 2,378
- Time zone: UTC+1 (CET)
  - Summer (DST): UTC+2 (CEST)

Xërxë (Albanian: Xërxë, Serbian Cyrillic: Зрзе/Zrze) is a village in Rahovec municipality.

== History ==
The village Xerxe/Zrze was mentioned as 'Zirzova' in the Ottoman register of the 16th century. The Ottoman defter indicates that Xerxe was significantly Islamised. The inhabitants of Xerxe in the 16th century bore Albanian, Slavic and Islamic names. Fifteen bore Islamic names, Twelve bore Albanian names and the mansions ('Bashtina') listed bore Albanian, Slavic and Islamic names

== Notable people ==
- Almir Kryeziu, Kosovan footballer
