= KF Drini i Bardhë =

Football club in Kosovo

- Full name: Klub Futbollistik Drini i Bardhë
- Founded: 1975; 50 years ago
- Ground: Gjonaj Sports Field
- Capacity: 500

KF Drini i Bardhë (Albanian: Klubi Futbollistik Drini i Bardhë) is a professional football club from Kosovo which competes in the Third League (Group A). The club is based in Gjonaj, Prizren. Their home ground is the Gjonaj Sports Field which has a viewing capacity of 500.

== Honours ==
- Third League
  - Winners (1): 2025
