= FC Galaksia =

Football club in Kosovo

Galaksia
- Full name: Football Club Galaksia
- Founded: 1 March 2008; 17 years ago
- Ground: Galaksia Stadium
- Capacity: 1,000
- League: Kosovo Third League
- 2022–23: Kosovo Third League – Kosovo Plain's Group A, 2nd of 10

Football Club Galaksia (Albanian: Klubi Futbollistik Galaksia), commonly known as Galaksia, is a professional football club from Kosovo which competes in the Second League. The club is based in Gjilan. Their home ground is the Galaksia Stadium which has a seating capacity of 1,000.
