= KF Besëlidhja Prishtinë =

Football club in Kosovo

KF Besëlidhja
- Nickname: KFB
- Founded: 1956; 70 years ago
- Ground: Stadiumi Llukar, Pristina
- Capacity: 3,000
- League: Kosovo Second League (last)
- 2002–03: 10th of 12 (relegated)
Home colours	Away colours

KF Besëlidhja (Klubi Futbollistik Besëlidhja) was a football club based in Pristina, Kosovo. During the 1990s, Besëlidhja competed in the parallel sports system organized by the Football Federation of Kosovo, achieving its best result as league runners-up behind KF Liria in the 1994–95 season. The club competed in the Football Superleague of Kosovo until suffering relegation at the end of the 2000–01 season. Former players who spent time with the club include Mehmet Dragusha and Nazmi Binaku. The senior team ceased competitive league operations following the 2002–03 season.

== See also ==
- Football in Kosovo
- List of football clubs in Kosovo
- Kosovar Cup
