= KF Behar Vitomirica =

Football club in Kosovo

- Full name: Klub Futbollistik Behar Vitomirica
- Founded: 1979; 46 years ago
- Ground: KF Behari Stadium
- Capacity: 1,000+
- Chairman: Sefkija Ceman
- Manager: Senad Hamzic
- League: Kosovo Third League
- 2024–25: Kosovo Second League, 16th of 16 (relegated)

Klubi Futbollistik Behar is a professional football club from Kosovo which competes in the Second League. The club is based in Pejë. Their home ground is the KF Behari Stadium which has a seating capacity of 1,000. This football club is advancing everyday by the contributions of coach, staff and players. This club used to have teams of younger age groups which failed under unknown circumstances. Now, there is a team of girls which is called ''KFF BEHAR'', and the coach of this team is Safet Nurkovic. The stadium of this club is being renovated, the field was laid with modern artificial grass in 2022. Actually, the MKRS (Ministry of Culture, Youth and Sport) is building stadium seats with capacity 1000+ and the placement of stadium lights.
