= Gjonaj, Prizren =

Gjonaj: Gjonaj (Albanian); Ђонај/Đonaj (Serbian)
- village
- Interactive map of Gjonaj
- Coordinates: 42.250550°N 20.617239°E
- Country: Kosovo
- District: Prizren
- Municipality: Prizren
- Elevation: 413 m (1,355 ft)

Population (2024)
  - Total: 4,061
- Time zone: UTC+1 (CET)
  - Summer (DST): UTC+2 (CEST)

Gjonaj (Albanian: Gjonaj, Serbian Cyrillic: Ђонај/Đonaj) is a village in Prizren, Kosovo. The village lies within the Has region.

== Etymology ==
The village name Gjonaj derives from the Albanian name Gjon.

== History ==
The village Gjonaj is first mentioned in 1348 in the chrysobull of Serbian Emperor Stefan Dušan, along with eight other Catholic Albanian villages in the Prizren area, these villages are known with the names Gjinovci (Gjinajt), Magjerci, Bjellogllavci (Kryebardhët), Flokovci (Flokajt), Crnça, Caparci (Çaparajt), Shpinadinci (Shpinajt) and Novaci.

In the place where Gjonaj is today may have stood the town of Guri i Hasit. A church in Gjonaj is possibly one of the oldest Roman Catholic churches in Kosovo. Gjonaj is considered to have been the birthplace of Andrea and Pjetër Bogdani.

== Culture ==
The village is the place that hosts annually the Hasi Jehon Festival. The festival aims to preserve and promote the Albanian spiritual heritage through folk music, dances and popular games.

== Notable people ==
- Andrea Bogdani, 17th century Albanian scholar and priest.
- Pjetër Bogdani, 17th century Albanian priest, scholar and patriot.
- Elvis Rexhbeçaj, footballer (born 1997)*

== Sports ==
Gjonaj is home to the football club KF Drini i Bardhë.
