= FC Sharri =

Football club in Kosovo

- Full name: Klub Futbollistik Sharri
- Founded: 1973; 53 years ago
- Ground: Suad Brava Stadium
- Capacity: 500
- President: Asan Shkreta
- Manager: Kastriot Gashi
- League: Kosovo Second League
- 2024–25: Kosovo Second League, 5th of 16

FC Sharri (Albanian: Klubi Futbollistik Sharri) is a professional football club from Kosovo which competes in the Second League. The club is based in Hani i Elezit. Their home ground is the Suad Brava Stadium which has a seating capacity of 500.
