= KF Kosova VR Prishtinë =

Football club in Kosovo

Kosova VR Prishtinë
- Full name: Klubi Futbollistik Kosova Vranjevc Prishtinë
- Nickname: Hotelierët (Hoteliers)
- Short name: KFKP
- Founded: 1946; 80 years ago (as KF Kosova Prishtinë); 22 January 2020; 6 years ago (as KF Kosova VR Prishtinë)
- Ground: Bërnica Synthetic Grass Stadium
- Capacity: 1,500
- President: Visar Dauti
- Manager: Naim Pefqeli
- League: Kosovo Second League
- 2024–25: Kosovo Second League, 7th of 16

KF Kosova VR Prishtinë (Albanian: Klubi Futbollistik Kosova Vranjevc Prishtinë), commonly referred to as Kosova VR Prishtinë and colloquially known as Kosova VR, is a football club based in Vranjevc, Pristina, Kosovo. The club plays in the Third Football League of Kosovo, which is the fourth tier of football in the country.

== History ==
Kosova Prishtinë are two-time champions of Kosovo, both titles won during the 1950s and one-time winner of the Kosovar Cup, won during the 2003–04 season.

== Honours ==
KF Kosova VR Prishtinë honours
Type	Competition	Titles	Seasons/Years
Domestic	Football Superleague of Kosovo	1	1999–2000
Domestic	Kosovar Cup	1	2003–04

== Players ==
=== Current squad ===
Note: Flags indicate national team as defined under FIFA eligibility rules; some limited exceptions apply. Players may hold more than one non-FIFA nationality.

No.	Pos.	Nation	Player
1	GK	KOS	Visar Llugaliu
2	DF	KOS	Valton Abdullahu
5	DF	KOS	Besfort Krasniqi
6	DF	KOS	Rrezon Rudari
7	FW	KOS	Eris Bllaca
8	MF	KOS	Albin Bllaca
9	FW	KOS	Shkelzen Miftari
10	MF	KOS	Hamit Bunjaku
11	FW	KOS	Fatlum Shala

No.	Pos.	Nation	Player
12	GK	KOS	Petrit Gashi
14	DF	KOS	Laurent Dragusha
16	FW	KOS	Auron Ademi
17	MF	KOS	Trim Osmani
19	MF	KOS	Arber Fona
21	MF	KOS	Kujtim Fetahu
22	DF	KOS	Agim Musa (captain)
24	MF	KOS	Yll Cahani
27	DF	KOS	Endrit Cakolli
