= KF Rahoveci =

Association football club in Kosovo

- Full name: Klubi Futbollistik Rahoveci
- Founded: 1931; 94 years ago
- Ground: Selajdin Mullabazi Stadium
- Capacity: 1,000
- Manager: Liridon Leci
- League: Kosovo Second League
- 2024–25: Kosovo First League – Group A, 10th of 10 (relegated)

KF Rahoveci (Albanian: Klubi Futbollistik Rahoveci) is a professional football club from Kosovo that competes in the First League. The club is based in Rahovec. Their home ground is the City Stadium Stadium which has a seating capacity of 2,000.

== History ==
KF Rahoveci was founded in 1931. It was known as Anadrinia Rahovec (Podrimlje Orahovac) and later as Interplast Rahovec.

== Historical list of coaches ==
- (Kosovo) Liridon Leci (21 January 2025 – 29 April 2025)

== See also ==
- List of football clubs in Kosovo
