= Gjakova City Stadium =

Multipurpose sports venue in Gjakova, Kosovo

Coordinates: 42°23′02″N 20°26′04″E

Stadiumi i Qytetit Gjakove
- Stadiumi i Qytetit Gjakovë
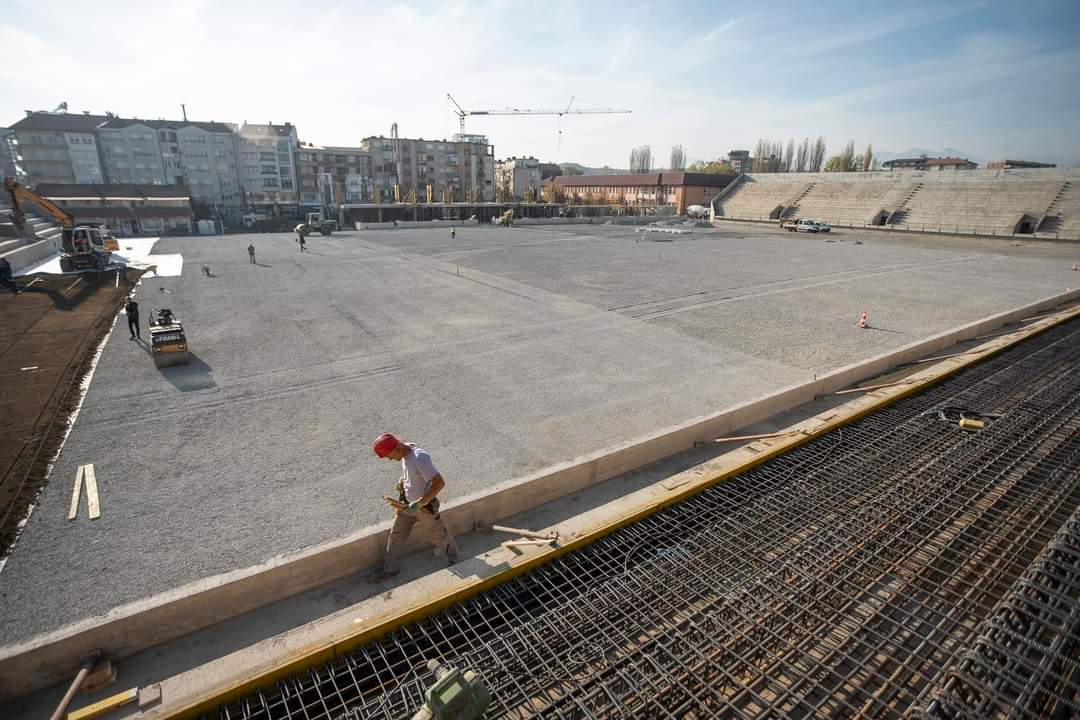
- UEFA
- Interactive map of Stadiumi i Qytetit Gjakove
- Location: Gjakova, Kosovo
- Owner: Municipality of Gjakova
- Operator: Vëllaznimi
- Capacity: 13,800 (After renovation)
- Surface: Grass
- Scoreboard: LED
- Field size: 105 by 68 metres (114.8 yd × 74.4 yd)

Construction
- Built: 1927
- Opened: 1927
- Renovated: 2010,2024-ongoing
- Closed: 2024-ongoing
- Cost: 9,500,000€(2024-ongoing)

Tenant
- KF Vëllaznimi

Gjakova City Stadium, located in Gjakova, Kosovo, is a multipurpose sports venue primarily used for football matches. It serves as the home ground for KF Vëllaznimi, a team in the Kosovar Superliga. The stadium is planned to have a capacity of 13,800 after the renovation is completed.

== History ==
In the 2020s, the Gjakova City Stadium underwent renovation to turn it into a UEFA category four stadium, to enable the Kosovo national football team to be able to play competitive international football matches there. Appeals had been made in the 2010s for funding for the project. Construction first started in 2020 when the Mayor of Gjakova laid the foundation stone. Construction was delayed owing to Gjakova failing to file required legal documentation with the Kosovan government auditor and issues with planning that resulted in a drop in seat numbers and a drop from UEFA category four to three. Full construction did not begin in earnest until 2023, when the Municipality set aside €2.5 million. The full project came about as a result of an agreement between the Ministry of Culture, Youth and Sports and the Municipality of Gjakova, whereby the Kosovan government paid €9 million towards the completion of the stadium reconstruction. The construction is scheduled to be completed in 2026. In February 2025, the Prime Minister of Kosovo, Albin Kurti visited the construction site.

In 2024, the Iniciativa për Progres (INPO) revealed information that the Municipality of Gjakova had discriminated during the tender process for the stadium. It alleged that the municipality openly favoured one bidder over the others, despite it being intended as an open tender process, as well as asking bidders to meet irrelevant standards or excessive safety qualifications. The municipality removed some of the stated requirements after the report was published but did not formally respond.
