= Football Federation of Kosovo =

Governing body of association football in Kosovo

UEFA
- Full name: Football Federation of Kosovo
- Short name: FFK
- Founded: 1946; 80 years ago; 20 August 1991; 35 years ago (current form)
- Headquarters: Pristina
- FIFA affiliation: 13 May 2016; 10 years ago
- UEFA affiliation: 3 May 2016; 10 years ago
- President: Agim Ademi
- Website: ffk-kosova.com (in Albanian)

The Football Federation of Kosovo (Albanian: Federata e Futbollit e Kosovës FFK) is the governing body of football in Kosovo, with headquarters in Pristina. The Football Federation of Kosovo was established in 1946 as a branch of the Football Association of Yugoslavia; it has since become independent and was headed by Fadil Vokrri until his sudden death in 2018. It organizes eight competitions of football in Kosovo.

== History ==
On 17 February 2008, Kosovo declared independence from Serbia. A number of countries such as France, the United States and the United Kingdom immediately recognised the new country. Others, such as Serbia, Russia and China, are opposed to Kosovo's independence.

On 6 May 2008, Kosovo applied for FIFA membership. "It's an historical moment for our country. We hope to be accepted", said Fadil Vokrri, president of the FFK. Kosovo's application was discussed at the FIFA Congress in Zurich in October 2008. FIFA rejected the membership application and denied Kosovo the right to play any friendly matches, as it was deemed not to comply with Article 10 of the FIFA Statutes, which states that only "an independent state recognized by the international community" may be admitted into FIFA. FIFA reverted that decision on 22 May 2012, stating that Kosovo may play other nations in international friendlies according to Article 79 of the FIFA Statutes. The Football Association of Serbia protested and felt the decision by FIFA's executive committee "blatantly contravenes the FIFA statutes". Three days later, permission was withdrawn by FIFA and a decision was delayed following pressure from the Football Association of Serbia and Michel Platini.

Evolution of the FFK logo over the years

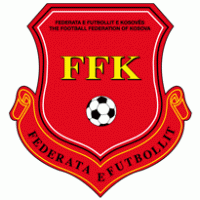
Prior to 2008

2008–2018

2018–2021

In September 2012, Albanian international Lorik Cana, along with Swiss internationals Xherdan Shaqiri, Granit Xhaka and Valon Behrami (all of whom are of Kosovar Albanian origin) wrote a declaration to the president of FIFA, Sepp Blatter, asking him to allow the Kosovo national team to be allowed to play friendly matches. The declaration was also signed by 5 other Albanian footballers. This came about as a consequence of the decision by FIFA not to allow the Kosovo team to play friendly matches against other national teams. In a meeting held in May 2012, FIFA decided to allow friendly matches to be played, a decision it later revoked following a strong protest issued by Football Association of Serbia. A new meeting was planned to be held at FIFA on 27 and 28 September same year in which the Kosovo issue was again planned to be discussed, which was then postponed until December.

In February 2013, FIFA announced that they would allow Kosovo to play against other nations in non-official competitions at youth and amateur level, female international level, and at club level providing that they did not display national symbols on the kit such as a national flag or play a Kosovar national anthem. If the FFK wished for Kosovo to play a game within the Kosovo region, they would require permission to play from the Football Association of Serbia. The first competition that a Kosovar national team entered was the Valais Youth Cup in which the Kosovo Under 21 national team participated, losing on penalties after a 2–2 with Ghana and losing 8–0 to Egypt in the third place playoff.

The Football Associations of Serbia and Kosovo met with FIFA on 10 January 2014 to discuss whether Kosovo should be allowed to play friendlies against other FIFA member associations at full international level. On 13 January 2014, FIFA issued a public statement stating that Kosovo would be allowed to play international friendlies against full FIFA members. FIFA maintained that the Kosovar playing kit should not contain national symbols nor should a Kosovar national anthem be played. FIFA also required that they acted as the intermediary between Serbia and Kosovo, and Kosovo would need to give 21 days' notice should they wish to a host a game.

In September 2015, UEFA announced that FFK's application for membership would be decided in May 2016. In May 2016, FFK was approved to become a member of UEFA following a secret ballot at the 40th Ordinary Congress in Budapest. Following this, on 13 May 2016, Kosovo was voted into FIFA during their 66th congress in Mexico, with 141 votes in favour and 23 against; its existing UEFA membership was cited as a factor in the decision.

Some football clubs, especially from North Kosovo, refuse to enter the Republic of Kosovo's institutions and continue to be part of Football Association of Serbia. The Serbian Zone League, the fourth tier of Serbian football, contains two leagues with clubs from Kosovo: Morava Zone League and League of North Kosovo.

=== Past office bearers ===
Presidents

President	Period
(Republic of Kosova) Agim Bytyqi	1991–1994
(Republic of Kosova) Rexhep Abdullahu	1994–2000
(Kosovo) Sabri Hashani	2000–2008
(Kosovo) Fadil Vokrri	2008–2018
(Kosovo) Agim Ademi	2018–present

Vice-presidents

Vice-presidents	Period
(Republic of Kosova) Hamdi Tovërlani	1991–2000
(Republic of Kosova) Gafurr Kabashi	1991–2000
(Kosovo) Adem Çollakaj	2000–2004
(Kosovo) Afërdita Fazlija	2000–2004
(Kosovo) Haki Demolli	2004–2008
(Kosovo) Agim Ademi	2004–2018
(Kosovo) Bekim Haxhiu	2008–2016
(Kosovo) (Serbia) Predrag Jović	2008–present
(Kosovo) Bakir Burri	2018–present
(Kosovo) Agim Dibrani	2018–present

General Secretary

General Secretary	Period
(Republic of Kosova) Sejdi Mërkoja	1991–1994
(Republic of Kosova) Ali Shkreli	1994–2000
(Kosovo) Blerim Vula	2000–2006
(Kosovo) Eroll Salihu	2006–2022
(Kosovo) Taulant Hodaj (acting)	2022–2023
(Germany) Markus Weidner (acting)	2023–present

== Structure ==
=== Competitions ===
==== Men's ====
Football

- Superleague with 10 clubs
- First League with 18 clubs
- Second League with 18 clubs
- Third League with 34 clubs (separated in 2 groups)
- Cup with 106 clubs
- Supercup with 2 clubs

Youth

- U21 Superleague with 10 clubs
- U19 Superleague with 16 clubs
- U19 First League with 11 clubs
- U17 Superleague with 16 clubs

Futsal

- Superleague with 9 clubs
- First League with 8 clubs

==== Women's ====
- Superleague with 8 clubs
- First League with 6 clubs
- Cup with 14 clubs

=== Executive committee ===
Position	Name
President	(Kosovo) Agim Ademi
Vice-presidents	(Kosovo) Bakir Burri
Vice-presidents	(Kosovo) Agim Dibrani
Vice-presidents	(Kosovo) (Serbia) Predrag Jović
General Secretary Technical Director	(Germany) Markus Weidner (acting)
Members
Members	(Kosovo) Agim Nura
Members	(Kosovo) Ilaz Mjaku
Members	(Kosovo) Ismail Ajeti
Members	(Kosovo) Mirsad Çollaku
Members	(Kosovo) Naser Ajeti
Members	(Kosovo) Vjollca Krasniqi
Members	(Kosovo) Xhelal Broja

=== National teams ===
The Football Federation of Kosovo also organises national football teams representing Kosovo at all age levels:

National team	Head coach	Captain
Men's
Senior	(Germany) Franco Foda	Vedat Muriqi
Under-23	Inactive	Rotation
Under-21	(Kosovo) (Switzerland) Hekuran Kryeziu	Rotation
Under-20	Inactive	Rotation
Under-19	(Kosovo) (Switzerland) Albert Bunjaku	Rotation
Under-18	Inactice	Rotation
Under-17 Under-16	(Kosovo) Fadil Berisha (acting)	Rotation
Under-15	(Kosovo) Ilir Nallbani	Rotation
Futsal	(Kosovo) Agon Ramadani	Rotation
Women's
Senior	(Kosovo) Sanije Krasniqi (acting)	Erëleta Memeti
Under-19	(Albania) (Kosovo) Albina Rrahmani	Rotation
Under-17	(Kosovo) Sanije Krasniqi	Rotation
Under-16 Under-15	(Albania) (Kosovo) Albina Rrahmani	Rotation

=== National educational camp ===
Details

FFK National Educational Camp
- Kampi Edukativ Nacional i FFK-së
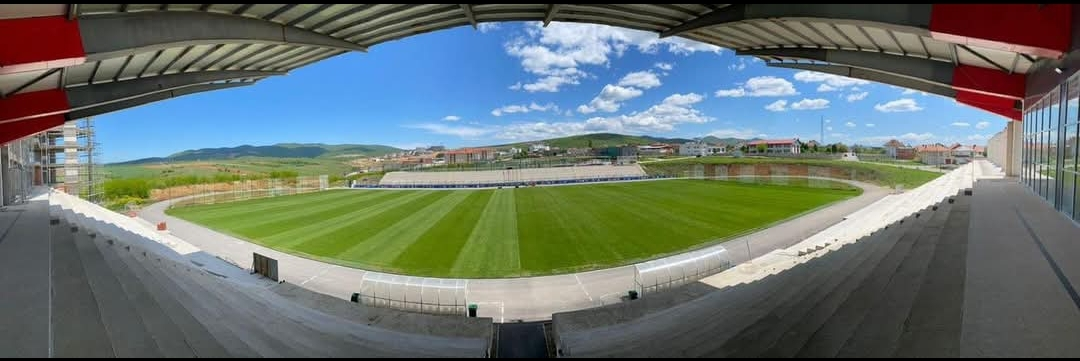
- UEFA
- Interactive map of FFK National Educational Camp
- Full name: Kampi Edukativ Nacional i Federatës së Futbollit të Kosovës
- Former names: Hajvalia Stadium (until 2017)
- Location: Hajvalia, Kosovo
- Coordinates: 42.62677°N 21.18656°E
- Owner: Football Federation of Kosovo
- Operator: Football Federation of Kosovo
- Capacity: 4,000
- Surface: Grass
- Scoreboard: LED
- Field size: 105 by 68 metres (114.8 yd × 74.4 yd)

Construction
- Built: 2017
- Opened: 2017; 9 years ago
- Renovated: 2023–ongoing
- Cost: €1 Million (2017)
- Architect: ALB-Architect

Tenants
- FC Hajvalia (formerly); KF Prishtina e Re; Kosovo national football teams (training sessions)

The FFK National Educational Camp (Albanian: Kampi Edukativ Nacional i FFK-së), previously known as Hajvalia Stadium (Albanian: Stadiumi i Hajvalisë), is a stadium located in the village of Hajvalia, near Pristina, Kosovo. It serves as the training location for the Kosovo national football team, as well as the former home ground for KF Hajvalia, a dissolved club that has competed in various Kosovar football leagues. It currently has a capacity of 4,000 people.
