= First Football League of Kosovo =

Second-tier men's association football league in Kosovo

- Organising body: FFK Competitions Commission
- Country: Kosovo
- Confederation: UEFA
- Number of clubs: 18
- Level on pyramid: 2
- Promotion to: Kosovo Superleague
- Relegation to: Kosovo Second League
- Domestic cup: Kosovar Cup
- Current champions: Group A: Drenica (1st title); Group B: Prishtina e Re (1st title) (2024–25)
- Most championships: Ferizaj (3 titles)
- Broadcaster(s): ArtMotion via ArtSport and Klan Kosova
- Website: FFK competition page
- Current: 2025–26 First Football League of Kosovo

The First Football League of Kosovo (Albanian: Liga e Parë e Futbollit të Kosovës), officially the Raiffeisen First League of Kosovo (Albanian: Raiffeisen Liga e Parë e Kosovës) for sponsorship reasons, is the second tier of the men's football league system in Kosovo. It is organised by the Football Federation of Kosovo (FFK).

As of the 2025–26 season the division consists of 18 clubs in a single nationwide league, following the merger of the previous two-group format used between the 2020–21 and 2024–25 seasons. Clubs are relegated to and promoted from the Second League, while the highest-placed teams move up to the Superleague.

== History ==
=== Early years ===
During the 1990s, amid the breakup of Yugoslavia and the exclusion of Kosovar Albanian clubs from official competitions, the FFK organised a parallel league structure outside state control. The so-called "independent" First League featured clubs from across the districts of Kosovo and was played on improvised grounds until the Kosovo War forced a halt to competition in 1998–99.

=== Post-war reorganisation ===
Following the end of the war in 1999, the FFK re-established a unified national league system and the domestic pyramid was restructured, with the creation of the Superleague as the top tier and the First League operating directly beneath it as the second division, ahead of the Second and Third Leagues. Since then, the First League has consistently been treated in media coverage as the second level of men's football in Kosovo, feeding clubs into the Superleague.

After Kosovo was admitted to UEFA and FIFA in 2016, champions and promoted clubs from the First League gained access to the top flight and, indirectly, to European club competitions through the Superleague.

=== Two-group era and expansion to 18 clubs ===
In the early 2020s the First League was reorganised into two parallel groups of ten clubs (Groups A and B). The winners of each group earned promotion to the Superleague, while lower-placed teams faced relegation or promotion/relegation play-offs with the Second League. In this format Drenica and Prishtina e Re won their respective groups in 2024–25 to secure promotion to the top flight.

Ahead of the 2025–26 season the FFK decided to merge the groups into a single 18-team championship under the Raiffeisen sponsorship, with two newly promoted clubs (including Tefik Çanga and Prizreni) joining established First League sides such as Trepça, Liria and Vëllaznimi. The change was intended to strengthen competitive balance and give clubs a longer, more coherent national schedule.

== Competition format ==
The First League currently consists of 18 clubs. In the 2025–26 season each team plays the others home and away for a total of 34 matches. Teams receive three points for a win, one for a draw and none for a loss, with league positions determined by total points, then goal difference and goals scored where required.

Under the competition regulations introduced for the 2025–26 campaign, the top two clubs at the end of the season are promoted directly to the Superleague. Places three and four enter an additional promotion play-off phase with the club finishing eighth in the Superleague, while the lowest-ranked sides are relegated to the Second League.

Previously, when the league was split into two ten-team groups, each club played 27 or 28 matches within its section. Group winners were promoted to the Superleague, while runners-up and lower-ranked clubs contested relegation and promotion play-offs with Superleague and Second League teams.

== Clubs (2026–27) ==
The 2025–26 season was the first to be played in a single 18-team national division. The following clubs take part in the competition 2026-27:

- 2 Korriku
- Besa Peja
- Dinamo Ferizaj
- Ferizaj
- Istogu
- Kika
- Lepenci
- Liria
- Mitrovica
- Prishtina e Re
- Ramiz Sadiku
- Rilindja 1974
- Suhareka
- Tefik Çanga
- Trepça
- Trepça '89
- Vëllaznimi
- Vjosa

== Media and sponsorship ==
From 1999 the competition has officially been known as Liga e Parë e Futbollit të Kosovës (First Football League of Kosovo), but from the 2020s it has usually carried the name of a title sponsor. For sponsorship reasons it has been marketed at different times as the:

Name		Period	Notes
Albanian	English	Period	Notes
Liga e Parë e Futbollit të Kosovës	First Football League of Kosovo	1999–present	Formal competition name used by the Football Federation of Kosovo in official documents.
Viva Fresh Liga e Parë e Kosovës	Viva Fresh First League of Kosovo	2021–2024	Naming-rights sponsorship by Viva Fresh Store.
Raiffeisen Liga e Parë e Kosovës	Raiffeisen First League of Kosovo	2024–present	Naming-rights sponsorship by Raiffeisen Bank Kosovo, a subsidiary of Raiffeisen Bank International.

Television rights to the First Football League of Kosovo, together with the Superleague and the Kosovar Cup, were awarded in 2021 to cable operator ArtMotion and free-to-air channel Klan Kosova under an agreement signed with the FFK. The deal, linked to the Viva Fresh title sponsorship, granted ArtMotion exclusive live coverage of First League fixtures in 2021–22, with participating clubs receiving a share of the broadcast revenue via the federation. Subsequent renewals have kept ArtMotion and Klan Kosova as primary broadcasters of First League matches and highlights.
