= Second Football League of Kosovo =

Kosovo third division association football league

- Organising body: FFK Competitions Commission
- Country: Kosovo
- Number of clubs: 16
- Level on pyramid: 3
- Promotion to: Kosovo First League
- Relegation to: Kosovo Third League
- Domestic cup: Kosovar Cup
- Current champions: KEK (2023–24)
- Website: Official website

Liga e Dytë is the third level of football in Kosovo. It consists of 16 teams that play each other twice (home and away) during the season. At the end of the season, the top two teams in the division are promoted to the First Football League of Kosovo.

== Clubs (2024–25) ==
Club	Location
Arbëria	Dobrajë e Madhe
Behar Vitomirica	Peja
Dardania	Qyshk
Deçani	Deçan
Dielli	Ferizaj
Dukagjini	Gjakova
Kosova VR	Pristina
Lepenci	Kaçanik
Podujeva	Podujevë
Prizreni	Prizren
Rilindja	Pristina
Sharri	Elez Han
Shqiponjat	Pristina
Tefik Çanga	Tërn, Ferizaj
Ulpiana	Lipjan
Vllaznia	Pozharan
