= Third Football League of Kosovo =

Association football league in Kosovo

- Organising body: FFK Competitions Commission
- Country: Kosovo
- Number of clubs: 24
- Level on pyramid: 4
- Promotion to: Kosovo Second League
- Domestic cup: Kosovar Cup
- Website: Official website

Liga e Tretë is the fourth level of football in Kosovo. It consists of 26 teams that are divided geographically in two groups and play each other twice (home and away) during the season. At the end of the season, the top two teams in the division are promoted to the Second Football League of Kosovo.

From the season 2019–20 the best seven clubs from each group of the previous season of the Liga e Dytë play in new formed and unique Second League while the other clubs have relegated into the new formed Third League.

== Clubs (2024–25) ==
Group A

Dukagjin Region

#	Club	Location			
#	Club	Location	1.	KF Anadrini	Rahovec
2.	FC Arbana	Prizren			
3.	KF Arbanasi	Sërbicë e Poshtme			
4.	KF Dardanët	Gjakovë			
5.	KF Drini i Bardhë	Gjonaj			
6.	KF Istogu 03	Istog			
7.	KF Opoja	Dragash			
8.	KF Rilindja e Kosovës	Skivjan			
9.	KF Runiku	Runik			
10.	KF Xërxa	Xërxë			

Group B

Kosova Region

#	Club	Location			
#	Club	Location	1.	FC Anamorava	Pozharan
2.	FC Barileva	Pristina			
3.	KF Besa 1978	Shipashnicë e Epërme			
4.	KF Dardana 10	Kamenica			
5.	KF Gadimja	Gadime e Ulët			
6.	FC Galaksia	Gjilan			
7.	KF Kosovari	Bardh i Madh			
8.	KF Mati	Pristina			
9.	KF Rinia	Fushë Kosovë			
10.	KF Sllatina	Fushë Kosovë			
11.	KF Studenti	Dobërçan			
12.	FC Tefik Çanga e Re	Tërn			
13.	FC TOP Football	Pristina			
14.	KF Uniteti	Vitina			
