= 2026–27 Football Superleague of Kosovo =

Football Superleague of Kosovo
- Season: 2026–27
- Dates: 15 August 2026 – May 2027
- All statistics correct as of 13 July 2026.

The 2026–27 Football Superleague of Kosovo season, also known as the ALBI MALL Superleague of Kosovo (Albanian: ALBI MALL Superliga e Kosovës) for sponsorship reasons, is the 28th (Note: This season is the 28th season under the name Football Superleague of Kosovo, the 34th season of top-tier football in Kosovo and the 80th season of football in Kosovo overall.) season of top-tier football in Kosovo. The season will begin on 15 August 2026 and will finish in May 2027.

== Teams ==
The leаgue consists of ten teams: the top eight teаms from the previous season, and two teams promoted from the Kosovo First League. Drita enters the season as defending champions.

The promoted teаms are the 2024–25 Kosovo First League winners Vushtrria, who return to the top tier after their last relegation in 2021, and First League runners-up Feronikeli, who only spend one season in the second tier. They replaced the 2025–26 Kosovo Superleague bottom two teams Ferizaj and Prishtina e Re.

=== Stаdiums and locаtions ===
Locations of the 2026–27 Football Superleague of Kosovo teams

Note: Table lists in alphabetical order.

Club	Town	Stadium and capacity		UEFA license
Ballkani	Suharekë	Suva Reka City Stadium	1,500	Yes
Drenica	Skenderaj	Bajram Aliu Stadium	3,000	No
Drita	Gjilan	Gjilan Synthetic Grass Stadium (Note: Drita and Gjilani will play their home matches at the Gjilan Synthetic Grass Stadium, instead of their regular stadium Gjilan City Stadium, (Note: Drita and Gjilani use this stadium together and have named the stadium with different names. Drita and their fans named the stadium as Selami Osmani-Bezi Stadium, while Gjilan and their fans named the stadium as Agim Ramadani Stadium, but officially the stadium is named Gjilan City Stadium.) which was under reconstruction.)	1,500	Yes
Dukagjini	Klinë	18 June Stadium	3,000	Yes
Feronikeli	Drenas	Rexhep Rexhepi Stadium	6,500	No
Gjilani	Gjilan	Gjilan Synthetic Grass Stadium	1,500	Yes
Llapi	Podujevë	Zahir Pajaziti Stadium	8,000	Yes
Malisheva	Malishevë	Liman Gegaj Stadium	2,000	Yes
Prishtina	Prishtinë	Fadil Vokrri Stadium	13,000	Yes
Vushtrria	Vushtrri	Various (Note: Vushtrria will play their home matches at various stadiums instead of their regular stadium, Ferki Aliu Stadium, which is currently under reconstruction.)		No

=== Personnel and kits ===
Club	Manager	Captain	Kit manufacturer	Shirt sponsor^{1}	
Ballkani	vacant	(Montenegro) Edvin Kuč	(Italy) Erreà	(Kosovo) Cima Construction	
Drenica	(Albania) Gentian Mezani	(Kosovo) Genc Hamiti	(Kosovo) Phoenix Sport	(Kosovo) Syla Group	
Drita	(North Macedonia) Ardian Nuhiu	(Kosovo) Rron Broja	(Italy) Macron	(Kosovo) AirTiketa (Kosovo) IPKO	(Switzerland) Rinora4 (Switzerland) Valon AG
Dukagjini	(Albania) Armend Dallku	(Albania) Elton Basriu	(Germany) Jako	(Kosovo) General IMMO Group	
Feronikeli	(Kosovo) Elon Berisha	(Kosovo) Armend Halili	(Germany) Erima	none	
Gjilani	(North Macedonia) Zekirija Ramadani	(Kosovo) Armend Thaqi	(Germany) Jako	(Kosovo) Ceni Plastech (Kosovo) EL-BAU shpk	(Kosovo) Monopol City (Switzerland) PRO Architekten GmbH
Llapi	(Kosovo) Tahir Batatina	(Kosovo) Benjamin Emini	(Germany) Jako	(Switzerland) Batatina GmBH (Switzerland) Bären Baugruppe AG	(Switzerland) EN-OS GmbH (Kosovo) S//SPRINT
Malisheva	(Kosovo) Kastriot Rexha (C)	(Kosovo) Dreni Kryeziu	(Italy) Erreà	(Kosovo) Patroni	
Prishtina	(Albania) Orges Shehi	(Kosovo) Leotrim Kryeziu	(Germany) Jako	(England) (Kosovo) Alexander Chapman SH.P.K. (Kosovo) NLB Banka Prishtina	
Vushtrria	(Kosovo) Fitim Llapashtica	(Kosovo) Daut Maxhuni	(Kosovo) locally produced	none	

1. On the front of shirt.

=== Managerial changes ===
- Dates in italics are pre-season changes.

Team	Outgoing manager	Date of vacancy	Incoming manager	Date of appointment
Prishtina	(Kosovo) Alban Dragusha	4 June 2026	(Albania) Orges Shehi	5 June 2026
Malisheva	(Kosovo) Bylbyl Sokoli	12 June 2026	(Germany) Thomas Brdarić	20 June 2026
Drenica	(Germany) Thomas Brdarić	17 June 2026	(Kosovo) Jeton Mehmeti	15 July 2026
Vushtrria	(Albania) Armend Dallku	16 July 2026	(Kosovo) Besnik Kollari	20 July 2026
Dukagjini	(Kosovo) Arsim Thaqi	2 August 2026	(Albania) Armend Dallku	3 August 2026
Drita	(North Macedonia) Zekirija Ramadani	4 August 2026	(Kosovo) Visar Sermaxhaj (C)	5 August 2026
Drita	(Kosovo) Visar Sermaxhaj (C)	10 August 2026	(North Macedonia) Ardian Nuhiu	10 August 2026
Ballkani	(Bosnia and Herzegovina) Mislav Karoglan	26 August 2026	(Kosovo) Sami Sermaxhaj	27 August 2026
Vushtrria	(Kosovo) Besnik Kollari	30 September 2026	(Kosovo) Fitim Llapashtica	1 October 2026
Malisheva	(Germany) Thomas Brdarić	6 October 2026	(Kosovo) Kastriot Rexha (C)	6 October 2026
Gjilani	(Albania) Debatik Curri	11 October 2026	(Kosovo) Blerim Bunjaku (C)	11 October 2026
Gjilani	(Kosovo) Blerim Bunjaku (C)	16 October 2026	(North Macedonia) Zekirija Ramadani	16 October 2026
Drenica	(Kosovo) Jeton Mehmeti	25 October 2026	(Albania) Gentian Mezani	26 October 2026
Ballkani	(Kosovo) Sami Sermaxhaj	9 November 2026	vacant	

== League table ==
Pos	Team	Pld	W	D	L	GF	GA	GD	Pts	Qualification or relegation
1	Prishtina	14	11	2	1	28	10	+18	35	Qualification for the Champions League first qualifying round
2	Malisheva	14	9	3	2	29	12	+17	30	Qualification for the Conference League first qualifying round
3	Drita	14	8	3	3	23	14	+9	27	Qualification for the Conference League first qualifying round
4	Ballkani	14	7	1	6	20	12	+8	22	
5	Gjilani	14	6	4	4	20	16	+4	22	
6	Dukagjini	14	4	6	4	12	13	−1	18	
7	Feronikeli	14	4	3	7	14	20	−6	15	
8	Drenica	14	2	6	6	13	23	−10	12	Qualification for the Relegation play-off
9	Llapi	14	3	2	9	15	27	−12	11	Relegation to Kosovo First League
10	Vushtrria	14	1	0	13	8	35	−27	3	Relegation to Kosovo First League

Updated to match(es) played on 22 November 2026. Source: Official website
Rules for classification: 1) Points; 2) Head-to-head points; 3) Head-to-head goal difference; 4) Goal difference; 5) Goals scored; 6) Play-offs (only if needed to decide champions, teams for relegation or teams for UEFA competitions)

== Results ==
Home \ Away	BAL	DRE	DRI	DUK	FER	GJI	LLA	MAL	PRI	VUS	BAL	DRE	DRI	DUK	FER	GJI	LLA	MAL	PRI	VUS
Ballkani	—	4–0	0–1	0–0	2–0	3–1			0–1	2–1	—									
Drenica	0–2	—	1–1	0–0	2–2		4–0	0–2	1–4			—								
Drita		0–0	—		4–3	0–0	5–3	0–1	1–2	3–1			—							
Dukagjini		1–1	1–2	—	1–0	1–1	0–1	2–0		1–0				—						
Feronikeli	1–0		1–0	3–0	—	1–3	0–0	0–3		3–1					—					
Gjilani	1–0	3–0		2–2	1–0	—	1–1	3–2	1–2							—				
Llapi	0–1		1–2	1–2		0–2	—	0–4	0–1	4–1							—			
Malisheva	2–1	1–1		2–1	0–0	3–1		—	1–1	2–1								—		
Prishtina	4–2	3–0	0–3	0–0	3–0		4–0		—	1–0									—	
Vushtrria	0–3	0–3	0–1			1–0	0–4	1–6	1–2	—										—

Updated to match(es) played on 22 November 2026. Source: Official website
Legend: Blue = home team win; Yellow = draw; Red = away team win.
For upcoming matches, an "a" indicates there is an article about the rivalry between the two participants.

== Season statistics and awards ==
=== Top scorers ===
As of 20 November 2026

#	Player	Club	Goals
1	(Senegalese Football Federation) Assane Diatta	Prishtina	11
2	(Football Federation of Macedonia) Xhemal Ibishi	Malisheva	6
3	(Football Federation of Kosovo) Albin Berisha	Ballkani	5
4	(Football Federation of Kosovo) Kreshnik Uka	Malisheva	4
4	(Football Federation of Kosovo) Albin Krasniqi	Prishtina	4
4	(Association of Football Federations of Azerbaijan) Vusal Isgandarli	Malisheva	4
4	(Football Federation of Kosovo) Dienit Isufi	Dukagjini	4
4	(Albanian Football Federation) Blerim Krasniqi	Drita	4
9	(Football Federation of Kosovo) Oltion Bilalli	Gjilani	3
9	(Albanian Football Federation) Mark Bushaj	Malisheva	3
9	(Football Federation of Kosovo) Arjanit Fazlija	Prishtina	3
9	(Football Federation of Kosovo) Besnik Krasniqi	Drita	3
9	(Football Federation of Kosovo) Laurent Xhylani	Malisheva	3
9	(Football Federation of Kosovo) Armend Thaqi	Gjilani	3

=== Hat-tricks ===
Player	For	Against	Result	Date	Round
(Azerbaijan) Vusal Isgandarli	Malisheva	Gjilani	3–1	6 September 2026	4
(Senegalese Football Federation) Assane Diatta	Prishtina	Drenica	3–0	20 November 2026	14

=== "Star of the Week" Award ===
Week	Player	Club	Ref	Week	Player	Club	Ref
1	(Football Federation of Kosovo) Albin Krasniqi	Prishtina		19			
2	(Football Federation of Kosovo) Oltion Bilalli	Gjilani		20			
3	(Senegalese Football Federation) Assane Diatta	Prishtina		21			
4	(Azerbaijan) Vusal Isgandarli	Malisheva		22			
5	(Football Federation of Kosovo) Mërgim Pefqeli	Dukagjini		23			
6	(Senegalese Football Federation) Assane Diatta	Prishtina		24			
7	(Albanian Football Federation) Gjergji Kote	Drenica		25			
8	(Football Federation of Macedonia) Xhemal Ibishi	Malisheva		26			
9	(Football Federation of Kosovo) Besnik Krasniqi	Drita		27			
10	(Football Federation of Kosovo) Rin Ahmeti	Prishtina		28			
11	(Football Federation of Kosovo) Albin Prapashtica	Feronikeli		29			
12	(Football Federation of Kosovo) Agron Kolaj	Feronikeli		30			
13				31			
14				32			
15				33			
16				34			
17				35			
18				36			

== Notes and references ==
=== References ===
"Star of the Week" Award
