= 2024–25 Football Superleague of Kosovo =

Football Superleague of Kosovo
- Season: 2024–25
- Dates: 10 August 2024 – 25 May 2025
- Champions: Drita (4th title)
- Relegated: Suhareka; Feronikeli
- Champions League: Drita
- Europa League: Prishtina
- Conference League: Ballkani; Malisheva
- Matches: 105
- Goals: 250 (2.38 per match)
- Top goalscorer: Mevlan Zeka (17 goals)
- Biggest home win: Ballkani 4–0 Ferizaj (28 September 2024); Suhareka 4–0 Llapi (10 December 2024)
- Biggest away win: Feronikeli 1–4 Ballkani (4 November 2024)
- Highest scoring: Prishtina 3–3 Drita (15 February 2025)
- Longest winning run: Drita (5 matches)
- Longest unbeaten run: Drita (14 matches)
- Longest winless run: Feronikeli (14 matches)
- Longest losing run: Feronikeli (6 matches)
- All statistics correct as of 23 February 2025.

The 2024–25 Football Superleague of Kosovo season, also known as the ALBI MALL Superleague of Kosovo (Albanian: ALBI MALL Superliga e Kosovës) for sponsorship reasons with Albi Mall was the 26th (Note: This season was the 26th season under the name Football Superleague of Kosovo, the 32nd season of top-tier football in Kosovo and the 78th season of football in Kosovo overall.) season of top-tier football in Kosovo. The season began on 10 August 2024 and ended on 25 May 2025.

Ballkani were the defending champions from the previous season, but failed to defend their title, falling short to Drita.

== Teams ==
The leаgue consisted of ten teams – the top eight teаms from the previous season and two teams promoted from the 2023–24 First Football League of Kosovo.

The two directly promoted teаms were Suhareka and Ferizaj, winners of the 2023–24 Kosovo First League groups A and B, respectively. They replaced the 2023–24 Kosovo Superleague bottom two teams, Liria Prizren and Fushë Kosova.

=== Stаdiums and locаtions ===
Locations of the 2024–25 Football Superleague of Kosovo teams

Note: Table lists in alphabetical order.

Club	Town	Stadium and capacity		UEFA license
Ballkani	Suhareka	Suva Reka City Stadium	1,500	Yes
Drita	Gjilan	Gjilan Synthetic Grass Stadium (Note: Drita and Gjilani will play their home matches at the Gjilan Synthetic Grass Stadium, instead of their regular stadium Gjilan City Stadium, (Note: Drita and Gjilani use this stadium together and have named the stadium with different names. Drita and their fans named the stadium as Selami Osmani-Bezi Stadium, while Gjilan and their fans named the stadium as Agim Ramadani Stadium, but officially the stadium is named Gjilan City Stadium.) which was under reconstruction.)	1,500	Yes
Dukagjini	Klinë	18 June Stadium	3,000	No
Ferizaj	Ferizaj	Ferizaj Synthetic Grass Stadium	1,500	No
Feronikeli	Drenas	Rexhep Rexhepi Stadium	2,000	No
Gjilani	Gjilan	Gjilan Synthetic Grass Stadium	1,500	Yes
Llapi	Podujevë	Zahir Pajaziti Stadium	8,000	Yes
Malisheva	Malishevë	Liman Gegaj Stadium	2,000	Yes
Prishtina	Prishtinë	Fadil Vokrri Stadium	13,000	Yes
Suhareka	Suhareka	Suhareka City Stadium	1,500	No

=== Personnel and kits ===
Club	Manager	Captain	Kit manufacturer	Shirt sponsor^{1}		
Ballkani	(Albania) Orges Shehi	(Kosovo) Bajram Jashanica	(Italy) Erreà	(Kosovo) Cima Construction		
Drita	(North Macedonia) Zekirija Ramadani	(Kosovo) Rron Broja	(Italy) Macron	(Kosovo) AirTiketa		(Kosovo) ALBTECH
Dukagjini	(Kosovo) Ismet Munishi	(Albania) Elton Basriu	(Germany) Jako	(Kosovo) Benita Corporation		(Kosovo) HAPPY SH.P.K.
Ferizaj	(Kosovo) Arsim Abazi	(Kosovo) Edon Sadriu	(Italy) Macron	(Kosovo) HIB Petrol	(Kosovo) Panorama Residence	(Kosovo) Termoluli
Feronikeli	(Kosovo) Granit Dervisholli	(Kosovo) Lapidar Lladrovci	(Germany) Jako	none		
Gjilani	(North Macedonia) Ardian Nuhiu	(Kosovo) Edison Kqiku	(Germany) Jako	(Kosovo) EL-BAU shpk		
Llapi	(Kosovo) Tahir Batatina	(Kosovo) Benjamin Emini	(Germany) Jako	(Switzerland) Bären Baugruppe AG		(Kosovo) S//SPRINT
Malisheva	(Kosovo) Bekim Isufi	(Kosovo) Dreni Kryeziu	(Italy) Erreà	(Kosovo) Patroni		
Prishtina	(Kosovo) Arsim Thaqi	(Kosovo) Ardian Limani	(Kosovo) Phoenix Sport	(England) (Kosovo) Alexander Chapman SH.P.K.	(Kosovo) IPKO	(Kosovo) NLB Banka Prishtina
Suhareka	(Albania) Mirel Josa	(Kosovo) Yll Hoxha	(Germany) Erima	none		

1. On the front of shirt.

=== Managerial changes ===
- Dates in italics are pre-season changes.

Team	Outgoing manager	Date of vacancy	Incoming manager	Date of appointment
Gjilani	(Albania) Gentian Mezani	25 May 2024	(North Macedonia) Ardian Nuhiu	9 June 2024
Suhareka	(Kosovo) Arsim Thaqi	26 May 2024	(Albania) Shpëtim Duro	26 May 2024
Dukagjini	(Albania) Armend Dallku	27 May 2024	(Kosovo) Ismet Munishi	4 June 2024
Prishtina	(Nigeria) Ndubuisi Egbo	2 June 2024	(France) Jean-Michel Cavalli	9 June 2024
Malisheva	(Kosovo) Qëndrim Kida	26 July 2024	(Kosovo) Bekim Isufi	26 July 2024
Feronikeli	(Finland) Shefki Kuqi	26 August 2024	(Kosovo) Fidan Rexhepi (C)	26 August 2024
Ballkani	(Albania) Ilir Daja	2 September 2024	(North Macedonia) Artim Položani	9 September 2024
Feronikeli	(Kosovo) Fidan Rexhepi (C)	30 August 2024	(Italy) Giovanni Colella	30 August 2024
Suhareka	(Albania) Shpëtim Duro	18 October 2024	(Kosovo) Qëndrim Kida	19 October 2024
Ballkani	(North Macedonia) Artim Položani	4 December 2024	(Albania) Orges Shehi	6 December 2024
Feronikeli	(Italy) Giovanni Colella	18 February 2025	(Kosovo) Granit Dervisholli	21 February 2025
Suhareka	(Kosovo) Qëndrim Kida	1 March 2025	(Kosovo) Armend Simnica (C)	1 March 2025
Suhareka	(Kosovo) Armend Simnica (C)	13 March 2025	(Albania) Mirel Josa	13 March 2025
Prishtina	(France) Jean-Michel Cavalli	5 April 2025	(Kosovo) Arsim Thaqi	6 April 2025

== League table ==
Pos	Team	Pld	W	D	L	GF	GA	GD	Pts	Qualification or relegation
1	Drita (C)	36	22	8	6	59	26	+33	74	Qualification for the Champions League first qualifying round
2	Ballkani	36	17	11	8	61	39	+22	62	Qualification for the Conference League second qualifying round
3	Malisheva	36	14	11	11	44	39	+5	53	Qualification for the Conference League first qualifying round
4	Gjilani	36	13	12	11	48	47	+1	51	
5	Ferizaj	36	14	8	14	42	47	−5	50	
6	Prishtina	36	11	15	10	42	36	+6	48 (Note: Head-to-head points: Prishtina 7, Dukagjini 4.)	Qualification for the Europa League first qualifying round (Note: Prishtina qualified for the Europa League first qualifying round as the 2024–25 Kosovar Cup winners.)
7	Dukagjini	36	13	9	14	35	45	−10	48	
8	Llapi (O)	36	12	11	13	42	41	+1	47	Qualification for the Relegation play-off
9	Suhareka (R)	36	12	7	17	49	62	−13	43	Relegation to Kosovo First League
10	Feronikeli (R)	36	3	6	27	24	64	−40	15	Relegation to Kosovo First League

Source: Football Federation of Kosovo
Rules for classification: 1) Points; 2) Head-to-head points; 3) Head-to-head goal difference; 4) Goal difference; 5) Goals scored; 6) Play-offs (only if needed to decide champions, teams for relegation or teams for UEFA competitions)
(C) Champions; (O) Play-off winners; (R) Relegated

== Results ==
Each team plays each other four times (36 matches each), twice at home and twice away.

=== First half of season ===
Home \ Away	BAL	DRI	DUK	FRZ	FRN	GJI	LLA	MAL	PRI	SUH
Ballkani	—	2–3	2–0	4–0	3–1	3–3	2–1	1–0	1–0	1–0
Drita	1–0	—	2–0	3–1	2–1	1–1	3–1	2–1	3–0	4–2
Dukagjini	0–0	0–2	—	1–0	2–1	2–1	1–0	1–3	0–1	2–2
Ferizaj	1–1	1–2	2–1	—	2–1	3–1	0–1	1–1	1–3	0–1
Feronikeli	1–4	0–0	0–2	0–1	—	0–3	0–2	1–1	1–0	3–1
Gjilani	1–1	1–0	1–2	1–2	2–0	—	2–1	0–1	2–1	1–1
Llapi	0–0	1–0	0–0	1–1	2–2	1–1	—	0–1	1–1	3–0
Malisheva	3–2	0–0	2–1	1–1	0–0	2–1	2–1	—	1–3	2–2
Prishtina	1–1	1–1	3–0	1–0	2–0	2–2	3–2	0–0	—	0–0
Suhareka	0–2	1–2	3–1	0–0	2–0	3–2	4–0	1–3	2–1	—

Source: Soccerway
Legend: Blue = home team win; Yellow = draw; Red = away team win.
For upcoming matches, an "a" indicates there is an article about the rivalry between the two participants.

=== Second half of season ===
Home \ Away	BAL	DRI	DUK	FRZ	FRN	GJI	LLA	MAL	PRI	SUH
Ballkani	—	1–1	1–0	2–1	3–0	1–0	0–1	3–2	1–1	3–1
Drita	2–0	—	0–1	2–0	4–1	4–0	1–0	2–0	2–0	2–0
Dukagjini	0–5	1–1	—	3–1	2–1	0–0	3–1	1–0	0–0	1–1
Ferizaj	2–3	2–1	2–1	—	2–1	2–2	2–1	1–0	1–0	3–1
Feronikeli	3–3	0–1	1–0	0–1	—	2–3	0–3	0–0	0–1	1–3
Gjilani	2–1	0–0	1–1	1–0	1–0	—	2–3	0–0	1–1	3–0
Llapi	1–1	1–0	3–1	1–1	1–0	0–1	—	0–0	1–1	2–0
Malisheva	3–1	1–0	1–1	3–2	1–0	4–1	1–3	—	1–0	1–2
Prishtina	1–0	3–3	0–1	0–0	2–1	1–2	0–0	2–2	—	2–2
Suhareka	2–2	1–2	1–2	1–2	2–1	1–2	4–2	2–1	0–4	—

Source: Soccerway
Legend: Blue = home team win; Yellow = draw; Red = away team win.
For upcoming matches, an "a" indicates there is an article about the rivalry between the two participants.

=== Relegation play-off ===
The two runners-up of the 2024–25 Kosovo First League (Liria Prizren and Vushtrria) faced other in the semi-finals. The winners then faced the Kosovo Superleague eighth-placed team (Llapi) for the final place in the 2025–26 Kosovo Superleague.

==== Semi-final ====
24 May 2025
16:00

Vushtrria	3–1	Liria Prizren
Maxhuni 36'; Solomon 55'; Statovci 90+10'	Report	Nikqi 10'

18 June Stadium, Klina
Referee: Alban Shala (Kosovo)

==== Final ====
31 May 2025
16:00

Vushtrria	0–0 (a.e.t.)	Llapi
	Report
Penalties
Statovci (penalty missed); Iseni (penalty missed); Angelov (penalty scored)	1–4	(penalty scored) Ramadani; (penalty scored) Hasani; (penalty scored) Emini; (penalty scored) Useini

Fadil Vokrri Stadium, Pristina
Attendance: 6,000
Referee: Burim Jahmurataj (Kosovo)

== Season statistics and awards ==
=== Top scorers ===
As of 30 June 2025

#	Player	Club	Goals
1	(Football Federation of Kosovo) Mevlan Zeka	Suhareka	21
2	(Nigeria Football Federation) Sunday Adetunji	Ballkani	18
3	(Football Federation of Kosovo) Ardit Tahiri	Llapi	16
4	(German Football Association) Senad Jarović	Gjilani	13
5	(Football Federation of Kosovo) Drilon Hazrollaj	Malisheva	12
6	(Football Federation of Kosovo) Hekuran Berisha	Dukagjini	11
7	(Football Federation of Kosovo) Albert Dabiqaj	Drita	10
7	(Football Federation of Kosovo) Besnik Krasniqi	Drita	10
7	(Football Federation of Kosovo) Arb Manaj	Drita	10
7	(Football Federation of Kosovo) Leotrim Kryeziu	Pristina	10

=== Hat-tricks ===
Player	For	Against	Result	Date	Round
(Football Federation of Kosovo) Albert Dabiqaj	Drita	Llapi	3–1 (H)	25 November 2024	14
(Football Federation of Kosovo) Ardian Limani	Prishtina	Suhareka	4–0 (A)	12 April 2025	28
(Football Association of Bosnia and Herzegovina) Almir Aganspahić	Gjilani	Feronikeli	3–2 (A)	2 May 2025	32
(Football Federation of Kosovo) Mevlan Zeka	Suhareka	Llapi	4–2 (A)	11 May 2025	34

=== "Star of the Week" Award ===
Week	Player	Club	Ref	Week	Player	Club	Ref
1	(Brazilian Football Confederation) Queven	Ballkani		19	(Football Federation of Kosovo) Kenan Haxhihamza	Gjilani	
2	(Football Federation of Kosovo) Mevlan Zeka	Suhareka		20	(German Football Association) Senad Jarović	Gjilani	
3	(Nigeria Football Federation) Sunday Akinbule	Prishtina		21	(Football Federation of Kosovo) Albion Kurtaj	Ferizaj	
4	(Football Federation of Kosovo) Almir Ajzeraj	Drita		22	(Football Federation of Kosovo) Arlind Veliu	Malisheva	
5	(Football Federation of Kosovo) Arbër Pira	Malisheva		23	(Football Federation of Kosovo) Kenan Haxhihamza	Gjilani	
6	(Albanian Football Federation) Ahmed Januzi	Llapi		24	(Football Federation of Kosovo) Altin Aliu	Malisheva	
7	(Brazilian Football Confederation) Giovanni	Ballkani		25	(Nigeria Football Federation) Sunday Adetunji	Ballkani	
8	(Football Federation of Kosovo) Arlind Veliu	Malisheva		26	(Football Federation of Kosovo) Ron Raçi	Prishtina	
9	(Football Federation of Kosovo) Edon Sadriu	Ferizaj		27	(Football Federation of Kosovo) Faton Neziri	Dukagjini	
10	(Football Federation of Kosovo) Robert Rrahmani	Gjilani		28	(Football Federation of Kosovo) Ardit Tahiri	Llapi	
11	(Football Federation of Kosovo) Albert Dabiqaj	Drita		29	(Football Federation of Kosovo) Veton Tusha	Drita	
12	(Football Federation of Kosovo) Mërgim Pefqeli	Dukagjini		30	(Football Federation of Kosovo) Elvir Gashijan	Llapi	
13	(Football Federation of Kosovo) Lindon Emërllahu	Ballkani		31	(Football Federation of Kosovo) Armend Thaqi	Gjilani	
14	(Football Federation of Kosovo) Albert Dabiqaj	Drita		32	(Football Association of Bosnia and Herzegovina) Almir Aganspahić	Gjilani	
15	(Football Federation of Kosovo) Arb Manaj	Drita		33	(Football Federation of Kosovo) Erion Sadriu	Ferizaj	
16	(Football Federation of Kosovo) Lorik Boshnjaku	Suhareka		34	(Football Federation of Kosovo) Mevlan Zeka	Suhareka	
17	(Football Federation of Kosovo) Armend Thaqi	Gjilani		35	(Football Federation of Kosovo) Ron Raçi	Prishtina	
18	(Football Federation of Kosovo) Rron Broja	Drita		36	(Albanian Football Federation) Ahmed Januzi	Llapi	

== Attendances ==
#	Club	Average
1	Prishtina	892
2	Llapi	656
3	Ballkani	511
4	Ferizaj	506
5	Dukagjini	464
6	Malisheva	414
7	Drita	362
8	Suhareka	358
9	Feronikeli	372
10	Gjilani	233

== Notes and references ==
=== References ===
"Star of the Week" Award
