= 2025–26 FC Drita season =

Drita
2025–26 season
- Chairman: Valon Murseli
- Head coach: Zekirija Ramadani
- Stadium: Gjilan Synthetic Grass Stadium
- Football Superleague of Kosovo: Winners
- Kosovar Cup: Round of 16
- Kosovar Supercup: Winners
- UEFA Champions League: Second qualifying round
- UEFA Europa League: Third qualifying round
- UEFA Conference League: Knockout phase play-offs
- Top goalscorer: League: Besnik Krasniqi (8 goals); All: Besnik Krasniqi (11 goals)
- Biggest win: 3–0 v Besa Peja (Away); 3 December 2025 (Kosovar Cup); 3–0 v Prishtina e Re (Home); 7 March 2026 (Superleague)
- Biggest defeat: 0–3 v AZ Alkmaar (Home); 11 December 2025 (Conference League); 0–3 v Rayo Vallecano (Away); 18 December 2025 (Conference League); 0–3 v Ballkani (Away); 15 March 2026 (Superleague)
Home colours	Away colours	Third colours
- All statistics correct as of 14 April 2026.

The 2025–26 FC Drita season was the 26th consecutive edition of Football Club Drita in the topflight of Kosovar football. The team won both the 2025-26 Football Superleague of Kosovo and the 2025 Kosovar Supercup. In the 2025-26 Kosovar Cup, it was knocked out by KF Llapi in the round of 16. In European football, Drita played in the qualifying rounds of the 2025-26 UEFA Champions League, the 2025-26 UEFA Europa League and the 2025-26 UEFA Conference League. In the last one, the club entered the League Phase and finished in the top-24, reaching the knockout play-off round and becoming the best ever Kosovar club in a European competition before they were eliminated by NK Celje.

== Season overview ==
During the 2025–26 season, Drita became the first club from Kosovo to reach the second qualifying round of the UEFA Champions League by defeating Differdange 03 4–2 on aggregate. They also became the second club from Kosovo to reach the final stage of a European competition by defeating Differdange 03 again during the 2025–26 UEFA Conference League play-off round.

On 6 November 2025, Drita won in the Tallaght Stadium in Dublin against Shelbourne FC its first ever game in a final stage of a European competition. After winning also against Shkëndija Tetovo and having previously drawn against KuPS and Omonia Nicosia, Drita finished the League Phase of the Conference League with 8 points and qualified for the knockout phase play-offs. They lost 6–4 on aggregate against Celje.

== Players ==
=== Current squad ===
As of 20 February 2026

Note: Flags indicate national team as defined under FIFA eligibility rules; some limited exceptions apply. Players may hold more than one non-FIFA nationality.

No.	Pos.	Nation	Player
1	GK	KOS	Faton Maloku
2	DF	KOS	Besnik Krasniqi (vice-captain)
3	DF	MKD	Blerton Sheji
4	MF	KOS	Rron Broja (captain)
5	DF	COL	Juan Camilo Mesa
6	DF	GHA	Hasan Gomda
7	FW	KOS	Almir Ajzeraj
8	MF	GER	Vesel Limaj
9	FW	KOS	Arb Manaj
10	DF	KOS	Liridon Balaj
11	MF	MKD	Florent Ramadani
14	MF	KOS	Albert Dabiqaj
15	DF	MKD	Egzon Bejtullai
19	FW	ALB	Blerim Krasniqi

No.	Pos.	Nation	Player
20	MF	CIV	Mamadou Soumahoro
21	DF	MLI	Abdoul Karim Danté
22	GK	KOS	Laurit Behluli
25	FW	KOS	Veton Tusha
26	DF	CGO	Raddy Ovouka
32	DF	ALB	Jorgo Pëllumbi
36	MF	KOS	Ilir Mustafa
37	FW	KOS	Oniks Grezda
44	DF	GHA	Morris Fuseini (on loan from Pro Players FA)
66	MF	SRB	Engjëll Sylejmani
77	FW	ALB	Kristal Abazaj
93	MF	FRA	Kemehlo Nguena
94	GK	KOS	Leutrim Rexhepi
99	FW	GHA	Mike Arthur (on loan from United Black Eagles SC)

=== Academy players with first-team appearances ===
Note: Flags indicate national team as defined under FIFA eligibility rules; some limited exceptions apply. Players may hold more than one non-FIFA nationality.

No.	Pos.	Nation	Player
16	MF	KOS	Mitat Xhymshiti
35	FW	KOS	Etnik Bislimi

=== Out on loan ===
Note: Flags indicate national team as defined under FIFA eligibility rules; some limited exceptions apply. Players may hold more than one non-FIFA nationality.

No.	Pos.	Nation	Player
23	MF	KOS	Erion Ramushi (at Ramiz Sadiku until 30 June 2026)
74	GK	KOS	Eron Isufi (at Tefik Çanga until 30 June 2026)
98	MF	KOS	Meris Maliqi (at Dukagjini until 30 June 2026)

== Personnel ==
Current technical staff
Position	Name
Head coach	(North Macedonia) Zekirija Ramadani
Assistant coach	(North Macedonia) Sadat Saini
Assistant coach	(Kosovo) Visar Sermaxhaj
General manager	(Kosovo) Jetmir Salihu
Goalkeeping coach	(Kosovo) Afrim Shahini
Physiotherapist	(Kosovo) Fatlum Vranja
Physiotherapist	(Kosovo) Valbon Hoxha
Doctor	(Kosovo) Bujar Fazliu
Conditioning Coach	(Turkey) Abdullah Biricik
Board members
Office	Name
President	(Kosovo) Valon Murseli
President	(Kosovo) Flamur Bunjaku
General director	(Kosovo) Feti Murseli
Sporting director	(Kosovo) Valon Zymeri

== Competitions ==
=== Overview ===
Competition	First match	Last match	Starting round	Final position	Record							
Competition	First match	Last match	Starting round	Final position	Pld	W	D	L	GF	GA	GD	Win %
Football Superleague of Kosovo	17 August 2025	19 May 2026	Matchday 1	Winners	36	20	6	10	50	35	+15	55.56
Kosovar Cup	3 December 2025	10 February 2026	Round of 32	Eliminated	2	1	0	1	4	2	+2	50.00
Kosovar Supercup	25 January 2026		Final	Winners	1	1	0	0	2	1	+1	100.00
Champions League	8 July 2025	29 July 2025	First qualifying round	Eliminated	4	2	0	2	4	4	+0	50.00
Europa League	7 August 2025	14 August 2025	Third qualifying round	Eliminated	2	0	0	2	3	6	−3	0.00
Conference League	21 August 2025	26 February 2026	Play-off round	Eliminated	10	4	2	4	11	15	−4	40.00
Total					55	28	8	19	74	63	+11	50.91

Last updated: 31 May 2026
Source: Competitions

=== Football Superleague of Kosovo ===
==== Standings ====
Pos	Team	Pld	W	D	L	GF	GA	GD	Pts	Qualification or relegation
1	Drita (C)	36	20	6	10	50	35	+15	66	Qualification for the Champions League first qualifying round
2	Malisheva	36	18	5	13	58	50	+8	59	Qualification for the Conference League first qualifying round
3	Ballkani	36	17	7	12	61	41	+20	58	Qualification for the Conference League first qualifying round
4	Dukagjini	36	13	12	11	42	36	+6	51	Qualification for the Conference League second qualifying round (Note: The 2025–26 Kosovar Cup winners (Dukagjini) qualify for the Conference League second qualifying round.)
5	Gjilani	36	14	9	13	47	48	−1	51	

Source: Official website
Rules for classification: 1) Points; 2) Head-to-head points; 3) Head-to-head goal difference; 4) Goal difference; 5) Goals scored; 6) Play-offs (only if needed to decide champions, teams for relegation or teams for UEFA competitions)
(C) Champions

===== Results summary =====
Overall								Home						Away					
Pld	W	D	L	GF	GA	GD	Pts	W	D	L	GF	GA	GD	W	D	L	GF	GA	GD
36	20	6	10	50	35	+15	66	14	1	3	32	13	+19	6	5	7	18	22	−4

== Goalscorers ==
As of match played 31 May 2026

Rank	No.	Pos.	Player	Superleague	Kosovar Cup	Supercup	Europe	Total
1	2	DF	(Kosovo) Besnik Krasniqi	8	0	1	2	11
2	9	FW	(Kosovo) Arb Manaj	3	0	0	6	9
3	25	FW	(Kosovo) Veton Tusha	5	0	0	3	8
4	14	MF	(Kosovo) Albert Dabiqaj	4	0	0	3	7
4	77	FW	(Albania) Kristal Abazaj	6	0	1	0	7
4	19	FW	(Albania) Blerim Krasniqi	2	3	0	2	7
7	10	FW	(Kosovo) Liridon Balaj	4	0	0	1	5
8	99	FW	(Ghana) Mike Arthur	3	1	0	0	4
9	15	DF	(North Macedonia) Egzon Bejtulai	2	0	0	0	2
9	3	DF	(North Macedonia) Blerton Sheji	2	0	0	0	2
9	8	MF	(Germany) Vesel Limaj	2	0	0	0	2
9	32	DF	(Albania) Jorgo Pellumbi	2	0	0	0	2
9	21	DF	(Mali) Abdoul Karim Danté	2	0	0	0	2
14	26	DF	(Republic of the Congo) Raddy Ovouka	1	0	0	0	1
14	7	FW	(Kosovo) Almir Ajzeraj	0	0	0	1	1
14	17	MF	(Benin) Salifu Ibrahim	1	0	0	0	1
14	4	MF	(Kosovo) Rron Broja	1	0	0	0	1
14	37	FW	(Kosovo) Oniks Grezda	1	0	0	0	1
Own goals				1	0	0	0	1
Totals				50	4	2	18	74
