= 2025–26 Football Superleague of Kosovo =

Football Superleague of Kosovo
- Season: 2025–26
- Dates: 17 August 2025 – 31 May 2026
- Champions: Drita
- Relegated: Ferizaj; Prishtina e Re
- Champions League: Drita
- Conference League: Ballkani; Dukagjini; Malisheva
- Matches: 180
- Goals: 481 (2.67 per match)
- Top goalscorer: Kreshnik Uka (19 goals)
- Biggest away win: Malisheva 0–4 Prishtina e Re (17 August 2025)
- Highest scoring: Prishtina e Re 3-2 Prishtina (6 May 2026)
- Longest winning run: Prishtina (7 matches)
- Longest unbeaten run: Ballkani (8 matches)
- Longest winless run: Prishtina e Re (11 matches)
- Highest attendance: 3,000; Drenica 0–0 Llapi (17 August 2025)
- All statistics correct as of 6 May 2026.

The 2025–26 Football Superleague of Kosovo season, also known as the ALBI MALL Superleague of Kosovo (Albanian: ALBI MALL Superliga e Kosovës) for sponsorship reasons with Albi Mall is the 27th (Note: This season is the 27th season under the name Football Superleague of Kosovo, the 33rd season of top-tier football in Kosovo and the 79th season of football in Kosovo overall.) season of top-tier football in Kosovo. The season will begin on 17 August 2025 and end on 31 May 2026.

== Teams ==
The leаgue consisted of ten teams – the top eight teаms from the previous season, and two teams promoted from the Kosovo First League. Drita entered the season as defending champions.

The promoted teаms were the 2024–25 Kosovo First League Group A winners Drenica who return to the top tier after three years, and Group B winners Prishtina e Re. They replaced the 2024–25 Kosovo Superleague bottom two teams Feronikeli and Suhareka.

=== Stаdiums and locаtions ===
Locations of the 2025–26 Football Superleague of Kosovo teams

Note: Table lists in alphabetical order.

Club	Town	Stadium and capacity		UEFA license
Ballkani	Suharekë	Suva Reka City Stadium	1,500	Yes
Drenica	Skenderaj	Bajram Aliu Stadium	3,000	No
Drita	Gjilan	Gjilan Synthetic Grass Stadium (Note: Drita and Gjilani will play their home matches at the Gjilan Synthetic Grass Stadium, instead of their regular stadium Gjilan City Stadium, (Note: Drita and Gjilani use this stadium together and have named the stadium with different names. Drita and their fans named the stadium as Selami Osmani-Bezi Stadium, while Gjilan and their fans named the stadium as Agim Ramadani Stadium, but officially the stadium is named Gjilan City Stadium.) which was under reconstruction.)	1,500	Yes
Dukagjini	Klinë	18 June Stadium	3,000	Yes
Ferizaj	Ferizaj	Ferizaj Synthetic Grass Stadium	3,000	Yes
Gjilani	Gjilan	Gjilan Synthetic Grass Stadium	1,500	Yes
Llapi	Podujevë	Zahir Pajaziti Stadium	8,000	Yes
Malisheva	Malishevë	Liman Gegaj Stadium	2,000	Yes
Prishtina	Prishtinë	Fadil Vokrri Stadium	13,000	Yes
Prishtina e Re	Hajvali	Sami Kelmendi Stadium (Note: Prishtina e Re will play their home matches at the Sami Kelmendi Stadium, instead of their regular stadium FFK National Educational Camp, which was under reconstruction.)	2,500	No

=== Personnel and kits ===
Club	Manager	Captain	Kit manufacturer	Shirt sponsor^{1}			
Ballkani	(Bosnia and Herzegovina) Mislav Karoglan	(Kosovo) Bajram Jashanica	(Italy) Erreà	(Kosovo) Cima Construction			
Drenica	(Germany) Thomas Brdarić	(Kosovo) Genc Hamiti	(Kosovo) Phoenix Sport	(Kosovo) Dardania Residence		(Kosovo) FS Invest LLC	
Drita	(North Macedonia) Zekirija Ramadani	(Kosovo) Rron Broja	(Italy) Macron	(Kosovo) AirTiketa	(Kosovo) IPKO	(Switzerland) Rinora4	(Switzerland) Valon AG
Dukagjini	(Kosovo) Arsim Thaqi	(Albania) Elton Basriu	(Germany) Jako	(Kosovo) General IMMO Group			
Ferizaj	(Kosovo) Arsim Abazi	(Kosovo) Betim Haxhimusa	(Italy) Macron	(Kosovo) Banka Ekonomike		(Kosovo) HIB Petrol	
Gjilani	(Albania) Debatik Curri	(Kosovo) Edison Kqiku	(Germany) Jako	(Kosovo) EL-BAU shpk			
Llapi	(Kosovo) Tahir Batatina	(Kosovo) Benjamin Emini	(Germany) Jako	(Switzerland) Batatina GmBH	(Switzerland) Bären Baugruppe AG	(Switzerland) EN-OS GmbH	(Kosovo) S//SPRINT
Malisheva	(Kosovo) Elon Berisha	(Kosovo) Dreni Kryeziu	(Italy) Erreà	(Kosovo) Patroni			
Prishtina	(Kosovo) Alban Dragusha	(Kosovo) Leotrim Kryeziu	(Kosovo) Phoenix Sport	(England) (Kosovo) Alexander Chapman SH.P.K.		(Kosovo) NLB Banka Prishtina	
Prishtina e Re	(Kosovo) Qëndrim Kida	(Albania) Elvis Prençi	(Kosovo) TRG SPORTS	(Kosovo) M-Technologie			

1. On the front of shirt.

=== Managerial changes ===
Team	Outgoing manager	Date of vacancy	Incoming manager	Date of appointment
Malisheva	(Kosovo) Bekim Isufi	21 July 2025	(Croatia) Qatip Osmani	30 July 2025
Prishtina e Re	(Kosovo) Elon Berisha	22 September 2025	(Kosovo) Shpëtim Babaj	22 September 2025
Ferizaj	(Kosovo) Arsim Abazi	28 September 2025	(Albania) Nevil Dede	3 October 2025
Gjilani	(North Macedonia) Ardian Nuhiu	29 September 2025	(North Macedonia) Orhan Abdi (C)	5 October 2025
Gjilani	(North Macedonia) Orhan Abdi (C)	10 October 2025	(Albania) Debatik Curri	10 October 2025
Malisheva	(Croatia) Qatip Osmani	30 October 2025	(Kosovo) Skender Ulluri (C)	30 October 2025
Dukagjini	(Kosovo) Ismet Munishi	4 November 2025	(Kosovo) Ndue Përgjokaj	5 November 2025
Malisheva	(Kosovo) Skender Ulluri (C)	5 November 2025	(Kosovo) Elon Berisha	5 November 2025
Ballkani	(Albania) Orges Shehi	19 November 2025	(Kosovo) Edon Gashi (C)	19 November 2025
Prishtina e Re	(Kosovo) Shpëtim Babaj	24 November 2025	(Kosovo) Qëndrim Kida	24 November 2025
Prishtina	(Kosovo) Arsim Thaqi	24 November 2025	(Kosovo) Afrim Tovërlani	25 November 2025
Ballkani	(Kosovo) Edon Gashi (C)	25 November 2025	(Bosnia and Herzegovina) Mislav Karoglan	25 November 2025
Drenica	(Kosovo) Bylbyl Sokoli	3 December 2025	(Germany) Thomas Brdarić	9 December 2025
Prishtina	(Kosovo) Afrim Tovërlani	17 March 2026	(Kosovo) Alban Dragusha	18 March 2026
Dukagjini	(Kosovo) Ndue Përgjokaj	22 March 2026	(Kosovo) Arsim Thaqi	26 March 2026
Malisheva	(Kosovo) Elon Berisha	12 April 2026	(Kosovo) Bylbyl Sokoli	13 April 2026
Ferizaj	(Albania) Nevil Dede	19 April 2026	(Kosovo) Arsim Abazi	20 April 2026

== League table ==
Pos	Team	Pld	W	D	L	GF	GA	GD	Pts	Qualification or relegation
1	Drita (C)	36	20	6	10	50	35	+15	66	Qualification for the Champions League first qualifying round
2	Malisheva	36	18	5	13	58	50	+8	59	Qualification for the Conference League first qualifying round
3	Ballkani	36	17	7	12	61	41	+20	58	Qualification for the Conference League first qualifying round
4	Dukagjini	36	13	12	11	42	36	+6	51	Qualification for the Conference League second qualifying round (Note: The 2025–26 Kosovar Cup winners (Dukagjini) qualify for the Conference League second qualifying round.)
5	Gjilani	36	14	9	13	47	48	−1	51	
6	Drenica	36	15	5	16	46	55	−9	50	
7	Prishtina	36	13	10	13	52	51	+1	49	
8	Llapi (O)	36	13	10	13	46	50	−4	49	Qualification for the Relegation play-off
9	Ferizaj (R)	36	9	9	18	40	55	−15	36	Relegation to First Football League of Kosovo
10	Prishtina e Re (R)	36	8	7	21	39	60	−21	31	Relegation to First Football League of Kosovo

Source: Official website
Rules for classification: 1) Points; 2) Head-to-head points; 3) Head-to-head goal difference; 4) Goal difference; 5) Goals scored; 6) Play-offs (only if needed to decide champions, teams for relegation or teams for UEFA competitions)
(C) Champions; (O) Play-off winners; (R) Relegated

== Results ==
Each team plays each other four times (36 matches each), twice at home and twice away.

Home \ Away	BAL	DRE	DRI	DUK	FER	GJI	LLA	MAL	PRI	PRE
Ballkani	—	3–0	2–0	2–0	1–1	1–1	2–4	1–1	3–1	6–1
Ballkani	—	1–0	3–0	2–1	3–0	1–1	0–1	1–2	1–2	3–2
Drenica	2–0	—	3–1	1–1	2–1	0–1	0–0	3–4	3–4	1–0
Drenica	1–2	—	1–0	2–2	3–2	2–1	1–1	4–2	2–2	0–2
Drita	2–3	0–1	—	3–1	3–1	1–1	1–0	2–1	2–0	2–1
Drita	2–0	1–0	—	2–1	2–1	0–2	3–0	2–0	1–0	3–0
Dukagjini	0–0	3–0	1–1	—	2–0	2–0	3–1	1–2	2–3	1–1
Dukagjini	1–0	0–1	2–0	—	1–1	1–1	1–2	0–1	0–1	1–1
Ferizaj	1–3	2–0	1–0	0–1	—	0–1	2–1	0–2	0–5	3–0
Ferizaj	2–1	1–0	0–1	1–2	—	1–2	2–3	1–1	3–0	1–1
Gjilani	1–1	0–1	1–2	0–2	2–2	—	3–0	1–3	3–1	3–2
Gjilani	1–2	0–1	0–1	2–3	1–1	—	1–2	2–1	1–0	3–2
Llapi	2–2	4–3	1–1	0–1	1–1	4–1	—	0–0	2–1	1–1
Llapi	2–0	0–1	0–2	0–0	1–0	2–3	—	3–2	0–0	4–0
Malisheva	0–5	2–0	1–1	0–1	3–1	1–2	1–2	—	1–3	0–4
Malisheva	4–2	4–1	3–2	0–0	1–2	3–1	2–0	—	3–0	1–0
Prishtina	1–0	2–1	2–2	2–0	1–1	0–0	3–0	0–2	—	2–0
Prishtina	1–0	1–2	1–1	1–1	3–3	1–1	4–1	0–1	—	1–1
Prishtina e Re	0–3	0–0	0–2	0–0	0–1	0–1	1–0	0–2	4–1	—
Prishtina e Re	0–1	2–3	0–1	2–3	1–0	1–2	1–1	2–1	3–2	—

Source: Official website
Legend: Blue = home team win; Yellow = draw; Red = away team win.
For upcoming matches, an "a" indicates there is an article about the rivalry between the two participants.

=== Relegation play-off ===
The two runners-up of the 2025–26 Kosovo First League (Dinamo Ferizaj and Liria Prizren) faced other in the semi-finals. The winners then faced the Kosovo Superleague eighth-placed team (Llapi) for the final place in the 2026–27 Kosovo Superleague.

==== Semi-final ====
29 May 2026
16:00

Dinamo Ferizaj	2–0	Liria Prizren
Tette 62'; Shaljani 80'	Report

18 June Stadium, Klina

==== Final ====
6 June 2026
16:00

Dinamo Ferizaj	0–2	Llapi
	Report	Fiton Ademi 12'; Muhamet Hyseni 23' (pen.)

Rexhep Rexhepi Stadium, Drenas

== Season statistics and awards ==
=== Top scorers ===
As of 1 June 2026

#	Player	Club	Goals
1	(Football Federation of Kosovo) Kreshnik Uka	Drenica	19
2	(German Football Association) Senad Jarović	Gjilani	16
3	(Ivorian Football Federation) Valentin Serebe	Ballkani	15
4	(Football Federation of Macedonia) Mario Ilievski	Prishtina	13
4	(Football Federation of Kosovo) Almir Kryeziu	Ballkani	13
6	(Football Federation of Kosovo) Muhamet Hyseni	Llapi	9
6	(Albanian Football Federation) Etnik Brruti	Malisheva	9
6	(Senegalese Football Federation) Assane Diatta	Malisheva	9
6	(Football Federation of Kosovo) Altin Mërlaku	Dukagjini	9
6	(Football Federation of Kosovo) Armend Thaqi	Gjilani	9

=== Hat-tricks ===
Player	For	Against	Result	Date	Round
(Ivorian Football Federation) Valentin Serebe	Ballkani	Drenica	3–0	14 September 2025	4

=== "Star of the Week" Award ===
Week	Player	Club	Ref	Week	Player	Club	Ref
1	(Football Federation of Kosovo) Valmir Veliu	Prishtina		19	(Football Federation of Kosovo) Almir Kryeziu	Ballkani	
2	(Football Federation of Kosovo) Mërgim Pefqeli	Dukagjini		20	(Football Federation of Macedonia) Mario Ilievski	Prishtina	
3	(Ivorian Football Federation) Valentin Serebe	Ballkani		21	(Canadian Soccer Association) Ruben Silva-Richards	Ferizaj	
4	(Ivorian Football Federation) Valentin Serebe	Ballkani		22	(Football Federation of Macedonia) Mario Ilievski	Prishtina	
5	(Football Federation of Kosovo) Robert Rrahmani	Gjilani		23	(Football Federation of Kosovo) Laurent Xhylani	Malisheva	
6	(Football Association of Serbia) Iljasa Zulfiu	Dukagjini		24	(Football Federation of Kosovo) Almir Kryeziu	Ballkani	
7	(French Football Federation) Axel Gnapi	Llapi		25	(Football Federation of Kosovo) Blerind Morina	Gjilani	
8	(Football Federation of Kosovo) Blendi Baftiu	Prishtina		26	(Football Federation of Kosovo) Veton Tusha	Drita	
9	(Football Federation of Kosovo) Almir Kryeziu	Ballkani		27	(Football Federation of Kosovo) Robert Rrahmani	Gjilani	
10	(Football Federation of Kosovo) Altin Aliu	Malisheva		28	(Football Federation of Kosovo) Kreshnik Uka	Drenica	
11	(Football Federation of Kosovo) Bleart Tolaj	Ballkani		29	(Football Federation of Kosovo) Dienit Isufi	Dukagjini	
12	(Football Federation of Kosovo) Igball Jashari	Drenica		30	(Football Federation of Kosovo) Kreshnik Uka	Drenica	
13	(Football Federation of Kosovo) Kreshnik Uka	Drenica		31	(Football Federation of Macedonia) Xhemal Ibishi	Malisheva	
14	(Football Federation of Kosovo) Muhamet Hyseni	Llapi		32	(Football Federation of Kosovo) Arbnor Ramadani	Llapi	
15	(Football Federation of Kosovo) Donat Hasanaj	Prishtina e Re		33	(Football Federation of Kosovo) Kenan Haxhihamza	Drenica	
16	(Football Federation of Kosovo) Arlind Veliu	Malisheva		34	(Football Federation of Kosovo) Arianit Hasani	Llapi	
17	(Football Federation of Kosovo) Armend Thaqi	Gjilani		35	(Football Federation of Kosovo) Kreshnik Uka	Drenica	
18	(Football Federation of Kosovo) Betim Haxhimusa	Ferizaj		36	(Football Federation of Kosovo) Mërgim Pefqeli	Dukagjini	

== Notes and references ==
=== References ===
"Star of the Week" Award
