= Mevlan Zeka =

Kosovan footballer (born 1994

Personal information
- Date of birth: 28 May 1994 (age 32)
- Place of birth: Gjakova, FR Yugoslavia
- Height: 1.82 m (6 ft 0 in)
- Position: Forward

Team information
- Current team: Gjilani
- Number: 23

Senior career*
Years	Team	Apps	(Gls)
–2015	Vëllaznimi		
2015–2017	Feronikeli		
2017–2018	Liria Prizren		
2018–2020	Feronikeli	33	(11)
2020–2022	Ballkani	41	(10)
2022–2023	Gjilani	34	(10)
2023–2025	Suhareka	+35	(+22)
2025	UTA Arad	0	(0)
2025–2026	Malisheva	24	(7)
2026–	Gjilani	10	(2)
- * Club domestic league appearances and goals as of 19 October 2026

Mevlan Zeka (born 28 May 1994) is a Kosovan professional footballer who plays as a forward for Kosovo Superleague club Gjilani.

== Club career ==
=== Early career ===
Zeka started his career with Kosovan side Vëllaznimi Gjakovë. In 2015, he signed for Kosovan side Feronikeli, where for two seasons (2014–15 and 2015–16 season) he helped the club win the league title. Two years later, he signed for Kosovan side Liria Prizren, where he made eleven league appearances and scored three goals. Following his stint there, he returned to Kosovan side Feronikeli in 2018, where he made thirty-three league appearances and scored eleven goals and helped the club win again the league title and the cup.

During the summer of 2020, he signed for Kosovan side Ballkani, where he made forty-one league appearances and scored ten goals and helped the club win the league title. Two years later, he signed for Kosovan side Gjilani, where he made thirty-four league appearances and scored ten goals. Subsequently, he signed for Kosovan side Suhareka in 2023, helping the club achieve promotion from the second tier to the top flight.

=== UTA Arad ===
On 22 June 2025, Zeka signed a two-year contract with Romanian Liga I club UTA Arad, Ten days after joining the team during the preparatory session in Slovenia, he returned to Kosovo for personal reasons. Although initially expected to be a short absence, he did not return due to his wife's illness. As a result, UTA Arad considered taking the case to the FIFA tribunal, a process the player stated he was prepared to face.

=== Malisheva ===
In August 2025, Zeka began training and later joined the Kosovo Superleague club Malisheva. His debut with Malisheva came on 31 August against Dukagjini after coming on as a substitute.

== Personal life ==
Zeka was born on 28 May 1994 in Gjakova, Kosovo and is a native of the city. Growing up, he attended AAB University in Kosovo.
