= Arsim Thaqi =

Kosovan manager

Personal information
- Date of birth: 25 May 1971 (age 55)
- Place of birth: Malisheva, SFR Yugoslavia

Managerial career
- Years: Team
- 1994–1998: 2 Korriku
- 2014–2016: Trepça '89
- 2016-2018: Prishtina
- 2017–2018: Feronikeli
- 2018–2019: Flamurtari
- 2021–2022: Malisheva
- 2023: Drita
- 2023-2024: Suhareka
- 2024–2025: Drenica
- 2025: Prishtina
- 2026: Dukagjini

Arsim Thaqi (born 25 May 1971) is a Kosovan professional football coach who last served as manager of KF Dukagjini. He won the Kosovar Cup two times: the first one as manager of FC Prishtina in 2025 and one year later with Dukagjini. He guided KF Malisheva and FC Suhareka to their first-ever promotions to the Kosovo Superleague.

Thaqi was sacked by Prishtina on 24 November 2025 despite being at the top of the table with 26 points after 13 matches played.

On 26 March 2026, he was appointed manager of KF Dukagjini. The team from Klina was in the sixth position in the 2025-26 Football Superleague of Kosovo and had already qualified for the 2025-26 Kosovar Cup semifinals when Thaqi was officially announced. On 21 May 2026, they won the Cup defeating FC Ferizaj 2-1 in the final. Dukagjini finished the league in the fourth position.

On 2 August 2026, following a heavy defeat against FC Lugano in the second qualifying round of the 2026-27 UEFA Conference League, Dukagjini announced the termination of Thaqi's contract by mutual consent.

== Honours ==
=== Manager ===
Malisheva

- Liga e Parë: 2020-21

Suhareka

- Liga e Parë: 2023-24

Prishtina

- Kosovar Cup: 2024-25

Dukagjini

- Kosovar Cup: 2025-26
