= Nukić =

Nukić is a surname. Notable people with the surname include:

- Ajdin Nukić (born 1997), Bosnian footballer
- Mustafa Nukić (born 1990), Slovenian footballer
