= Axel Gnapi =

French footballer

Personal information
- Full name: Axel Aymeric Gnapi Dable
- Date of birth: 28 August 2001 (age 25)
- Place of birth: Le Mans, France
- Height: 1.92 m (6 ft 4 in)
- Position: Forward

Team information
- Current team: FC Fakel Voronezh
- Number: 9

Youth career
- –2019: Istres FC
- 2019–2020: AS Cannes

Senior career*
Years	Team	Apps	(Gls)
2020–2021	AS Cannes	2	(0)
2021–2023	RC Grasse	30	(4)
2023	AS Furiani-Agliani	8	(0)
2024	Racing Besançon	9	(2)
2024–2025	ASM Belfort	11	(5)
2025	FC Prishtina	17	(2)
2025–2026	KF Llapi	15	(7)
2026–	Fakel Voronezh	26	(1)
- * Club domestic league appearances and goals as of 7 November 2026

Axel Aymeric Gnapi Dable (born 28 August 2001) is a French professional footballer who plays as a forward for Russian club Fakel Voronezh.

== Club career ==
After playing for several clubs in lower leagues in his home country, Gnapi moved to Kosovo and signed for FC Prishtina in 2025. With them, he won the 2024–25 Kosovar Cup. On 14 June 2025, he signed for another Kosovar club, KF Llapi. He was chosen as the official "Player of the Week" of the league after scoring two goals against SC Gjilani in the seventh matchday of the 2025–26 Football Superleague of Kosovo.

On 16 January 2026, Gnapi signed for Russian First League leaders Fakel Voronezh.

== Career statistics ==
As of 7 November 2026

Club	Season	League			Cup		Total	
Club	Season	Division	Apps	Goals	Apps	Goals	Apps	Goals
Cannes	2019–20	Championnat National 3	0	0	0	0	0	0
Cannes	2020–21	Championnat National 3	2	0	—		2	0
Cannes	Total		2	0	0	0	2	0
Grasse	2021–22	Championnat National 2	17	3	0	0	17	3
Grasse	2022–23	Championnat National 2	13	1	1	0	14	1
Grasse	Total		30	4	1	0	31	4
Furiani-Agliani	2023–24	Championnat National 2	8	0	2	0	10	0
Racing Besançon	2023–24	Championnat National 2	9	2	—		9	2
ASM Belfort	2024–25	Championnat National 2	11	5	1	0	12	5
Prishtina	2024–25	Football Superleague of Kosovo	17	2	5	1	22	3
Llapi	2025–26	Football Superleague of Kosovo	15	7	0	0	15	7
Fakel Voronezh	2025–26	Russian First League	13	1	—		13	1
Fakel Voronezh	2026–27	Russian Premier League	13	0	4	0	17	0
Fakel Voronezh	Total		26	1	4	0	30	1
Career total			118	21	13	1	131	22

== Honours ==
Prishtina

- Kosovar Cup: 2024–25

Individual

- Kosovo Superleague "Star of the Week" Award: 2025–26 (Round 7)
