= Egzon Bejtullai =

Macedonian footballer (born 1994)

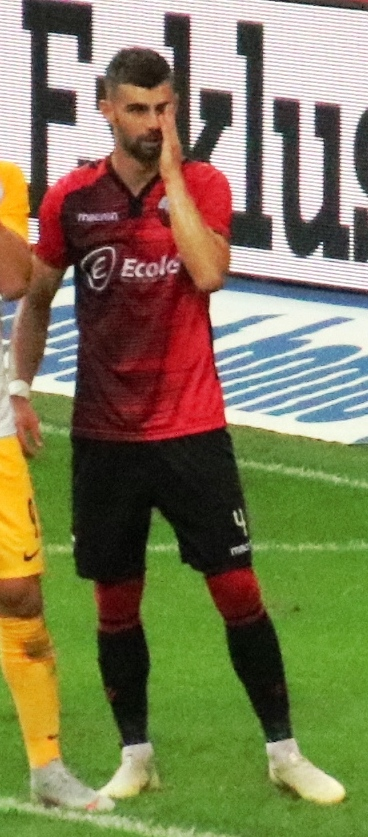
- Bejtullai with Shkëndija in 2018

Personal information
- Date of birth: 7 January 1994 (age 32)
- Place of birth: Tetovo, Macedonia
- Height: 1.86 m (6 ft 1 in)
- Positions: Right-back; centre-back

Team information
- Current team: Drita
- Number: 15

Youth career
- –2011: Teteks

Senior career*
Years	Team	Apps	(Gls)
2011–2013	Teteks	52	(9)
2013–2019	Shkendija	165	(7)
2020	Helsingborg	0	(0)
2020–2023	Shkendija	80	(1)
2023	Gjilani	7	(0)
2024–2026	Drita	76	(3)

International career^{‡}
2012–2014	Macedonia U19	7	(0)
2014–2017	Macedonia U21	8	(0)
2018–	North Macedonia	28	(0)
- * Club domestic league appearances and goals as of 8 November 2026 ‡ National team caps and goals as of 8 November 2026

Egzon Bejtullai (Macedonian: Егзон Бејтулаи; born 7 January 1994) is a Macedonian professional footballer who plays as a defender for North Macedonia national team. His last club was Drita.

== Club career ==
He started his career at FK Teteks, a local club. He made his professional debut in a match against FK Metalurg Skopje on July 30, 2011.

In the summer of 2013, he transferred to KF Shkëndija. He scored his first professional goal against FK Skopje on November 19, 2017.

He transferred to Helsingborgs IF in January 2020, but failed to get a chance to play, so he returned to his old home KF Shkëndija in June of the same year.

After two and a half years playing for Drita in Kosovo, the club from Gjilan announced that his contract had expired on 2 July 2026 and thanked him for contributing to winning two Kosovo Superleagues and one Kosovar Supercup.

== International career ==
Bejtullai is of Albanian Macedonian descent. Bejtullai was a regular in the Macedonia U21 team and performed at the 2017 UEFA European Under-21 Championship in Poland, where he served as first right back choice.

In May 2016 and March 2017 he also received call-ups for Macedonia in friendlies against Azerbaijan, Iran and Belarus, but he did not make his debut until 6 September 2018 during the first round of the 2018–19 UEFA Nations League D competition, when he entered the game against Gibraltar in the 85th minute.

During North Macedonia's opening fixture of the tournament against Austria, immediatedly after striker Marko Arnautović (who is half-Serbian) scored, Arnautović angrily shouted towards Bejtullai and teammate Ezgjan Alioski –both of Albanian descent–what were believed to be anti-Albanian slurs. Football Federation of Macedonia released a statement calling for action by UEFA.

In 2021, he was selected by the coach Igor Angelovski to compete in the UEFA Euro 2020.

== Honours ==
Drita

- Kosovo Superleague: 2024–25, 2025–26
- Kosovar Supercup: 2025
