= Arb Manaj =

Kosovar footballer (born 1998)

Personal information
- Date of birth: 23 July 1998 (age 28)
- Place of birth: Klina, Kosovo
- Height: 1.88 m (6 ft 2 in)
- Position: Centre-forward

Team information
- Current team: Drita
- Number: 9

Youth career
- 2004–2015: Dukagjini

Senior career*
Years	Team	Apps	(Gls)
2015–2017	Dukagjini	+11	(5)
2017–2020	Trepça '89	53	(24)
2020–2022	Ankara Keçiörengücü	17	(4)
2021	→ Balıkesirspor (loan)	14	(6)
2021–2022	→ Bandırmaspor (loan)	13	(1)
2022–2023	Slaven Belupo	23	(1)
2023–2024	Ballkani	4	(1)
2024–	Drita	53	(13)
2024	→ Zhenis (loan)	12	(2)

International career^{‡}
2020	Kosovo U21	1	(0)
2020–2021	Kosovo	3	(1)
- * Club domestic league appearances and goals as of 22 June 2026 ‡ National team caps and goals as of 11 June 2021

Arb Manaj (born 23 July 1998) is a Kosovan professional footballer who plays as a centre-forward for Drita.

== Club career ==
=== Dukagjini ===
Manaj at the age of 6 started playing football in Dukagjini. He before the start of the 2015–16 season was promoted to first team of First Football League of Kosovo club Dukagjini and suffered an ACL injury, two minutes after the start of the match against Ferizaj in third matchday of 2015–16 First Football League of Kosovo. After ten months, Manaj returned from injury, and in the next ten games he scored five goals and assisted three times.

=== Trepça '89 ===
On 22 July 2017, Manaj joined with Kosovo Superleague club Trepça '89.

=== Ankara Keçiörengücü ===
On 5 October 2020, Manaj signed a three-year contract with TFF First League club Ankara Keçiörengücü. Twelve days later, he made his debut in a 1–2 away win against Ümraniyespor after being named in the starting line-up. On 4 November 2020, Manaj scored his first goals for Ankara Keçiörengücü in his third appearance for the club in a 6–0 home win over Büyükçekmece Tepecikspor in 2020–21 Turkish Cup third round.

==== Loan at Balıkesirspor ====
On 1 February 2021, Manaj was loaned to TFF First League side Balıkesirspor until the end of the season. Six days later, he made his debut in a 3–0 home win against Akhisarspor after being named in the starting line-up. Seven days after debut, Manaj scored his first goal for Balıkesirspor in his second appearance for the club in a 1–1 away draw over Menemenspor in TFF First League.

==== Loan at Bandırmaspor ====
On 9 August 2021, Manaj joined TFF First League side Bandırmaspor, on a season-long loan. Five days later, he made his debut in a 0–2 away win against Denizlispor after coming on as a substitute at 81st minute in place of Guy-Michel Landel.

=== Slaven Belupo ===
On 26 July 2022, Manaj signed a two-year contract with Croatian Football League club Slaven Belupo. His debut with Slaven Belupo came on 14 August in a 0–1 away win against Rijeka after coming on as a substitute at 60th minute in place of Marko Žuljević.

== International career ==
=== Youth ===
==== Albania U19 ====
On 30 December 2014, Manaj received a call-up from Albania U19 for the unofficial friendly match against Italy U18, but he was an unused substitute in that match.

==== Kosovo U21 ====
On 11 November 2019, Manaj received a call-up from Kosovo U21 for the 2021 UEFA European Under-21 Championship qualification match against Austria U21. On 4 September 2020, he made his debut with Kosovo U21 in a 2021 UEFA European Under-21 Championship qualification match against England U21 after being named in the starting line-up.

=== Senior ===
On 24 December 2019, Manaj received a call-up from Kosovo for the friendly match against Sweden, and made his debut after coming on as a substitute at 84th minute in place of Elbasan Rashani. On 8 June 2021, Manaj scored his first goal for Kosovo in his second appearance for the country in a 1–2 home defeat over Guinea.

== Honours ==
Drita

- Kosovo Superleague: 2024–25

Individual

- Turkish Cup top scorer: 2021–22

== Career statistics ==
=== Club ===
As of 19 August 2022

Appearances and goals by club, season and competition
Club	Season	League			Cup		Other		Total	
Club	Season	Division	Apps	Goals	Apps	Goals	Apps	Goals	Apps	Goals
Trepça '89	2017–18	Kosovo Superleague	5	3	0	0	—		5	3
Trepça '89	2018–19	Kosovo Superleague	16	4	0	0	—		16	4
Trepça '89	2019–20	Kosovo Superleague	29	17	0	0	—		29	17
Trepça '89	2020–21	Kosovo Superleague	3	0	0	0	—		3	0
Trepça '89	Total		53	24	0	0	—		53	24
Ankara Keçiörengücü	2020–21	TFF First League	12	4	1	2	—		13	6
Balıkesirspor (loan)	2020–21	TFF First League	14	6	0	0	—		14	6
Bandırmaspor (loan)	2021–22	TFF First League	13	1	3	5	—		16	6
Ankara Keçiörengücü	2021–22	TFF First League	5	0	0	0	—		5	0
Slaven Belupo	2022–23	Croatian Football League	2	0	0	0	—		2	0
Career total			99	35	4	7	—		103	42

=== International ===
As of 11 June 2021

Appearances and goals by national team and year
National team	Year	Apps	Goals
Kosovo	2020	1	0
Kosovo	2021	2	1
Total		3	1

Scores and results list Kosovo's goal tally first, score column indicates score after each Manaj goal.

List of international goals scored by Arb Manaj
No.	Date	Venue	Opponent	Score	Result	Competition	Ref.
1	8 June 2021	Arslan Zeki Demirci Sports Complex, Manavgat, Turkey	Guinea	1–2	1–2	Friendly	
