= Assane Diatta =

Senegalese footballer

Personal information
- Date of birth: 5 April 2000 (age 26)
- Place of birth: Thiaroye-sur-Mer, Senegal
- Height: 1.76 m (5 ft 9 in)
- Position: Winger

Team information
- Current team: Prishtina
- Number: 17

Youth career
- –2018: ETICS Mboro

Senior career*
Years	Team	Apps	(Gls)
2018–2020	AS Pikine	?	(?)
2020–2022	Teungueth FC	?	(?)
2022–2023	Guédiawaye FC	?	(?)
2023–2024	Karşıyaka Anamur	?	(?)
2024–2025	Gostivari	21	(2)
2025–2026	Malisheva	31	(9)
2026–	Prishtina	14	(11)
- * Club domestic league appearances and goals as of 20 November 2026

Assane Diatta (born 5 April 2000) is a Senegalese professional footballer who plays as a winger for Kosovar club FC Prishtina.

== Club career ==
After developing in Senegalese football in AS Pikine, Teungueth FC and Guédiawaye FC, Diatta moved to Europe to play for Karşıyaka Anamur in the KTFF Süper Lig in Northern Cyprus, a competition which is organized by a federation not affiliated with FIFA. From there, he signed for North Macedonian club KF Gostivari in 2024 and one year later he moved to Kosovo to play for KF Malisheva. In the 2025-26 Football Superleague of Kosovo, he scored nine goals and attracted interest from abroad before agreeing to remain in the same league signing for FC Prishtina. He scored six goals in the six opening games of the 2026-27 Football Superleague of Kosovo and was selected as the "Player of the Week" in the sixth matchday by the Football Federation of Kosovo.
