= Ismet Munishi =

Kosovan footballer

Personal information
- Date of birth: 3 October 1974 (age 52)
- Place of birth: Gjilan, SFR Yugoslavia
- Height: 1.79 m (5 ft 10 in)
- Position: Midfielder

Team information
- Current team: Liria Prizren

Senior career*
Years	Team	Apps	(Gls)
1995–1996	Flamurtari		
1996–1998	Maribor	26	(1)
1998–1999	Şekerspor	37	(1)
1999–2000	Mura 05	7	(0)
2000–2002	Olimpija Ljubljana	24	(3)
2000–2001	→ Maccabi Herzilya (loan)	10	(0)
2001–2002	→ Korotan (loan)	4	(0)
2002–2003	Kocaelispor	0	(0)
2003	Šmartno	2	(0)
2004	Laçi		
2004–2005	Vorskla Poltava	9	(0)
2005	Besa Kavajë	6	(0)
2006	Tobol Kostanay		
2006–2007	Trepça		
2007–2008	Vëllaznimi		

International career
2002	Kosovo	1	(0)

Managerial career
- 2013–2014: Vushtrria
- 2016–2017: Drita
- 2017: Vëllaznimi
- 2017–2018: Feronikeli
- 2018: Besa Pejë
- 2018–2019: Vëllaznimi
- 2019–2020: Ballkani
- 2021–2022: Gjilani
- 2022–2023: Prishtina
- 2023: Ferizaj
- 2024–2025: Dukagjini
- 2026–: Liria Prizren
- * Club domestic league appearances and goals

Ismet Munishi (born 3 October 1974) is a Kosovan professional football coach and former player. He is the current manager of Liria Prizren.

== Playing career ==
He played football in seven countries: for Flamurtari, Trepça and Vëllaznimi in Kosovo; for Maribor, Mura 05, NK Olimpija Ljubljana, NK Korotan and Šmartno in Slovenia; for Şekerspor and Kocaelispor in Turkey; for Maccabi Herzliya in Israel; for Laçi and Besa Kavajë in Albania; for Vorskla Poltava in Ukraine, and for Tobol Kostanay in Kazakhstan.

In the 96-97 season, he won with Maribor the first Slovenian PrvaLiga title in the club's history.

== Managerial career ==
He won the 2013–14 Football Superleague of Kosovo as manager of KF Vushtrria and was runner-up in the 2019-20 Kosovar Cup with FC Ballkani.

On 4 June 2024, he signed for KF Dukagjini. He resigned for personal reasons on 4 November 2025 after recording 17 wins, ten draws and 15 losses in his 43 matches in charge. Dukagjini was fourth in the 2025-26 Football Superleague of Kosovo in the moment of his departure.

On 9 February 2026, Munishi was named manager of second-tier club Liria Prizren. When he was appointed, Liria was in the sixth position in the First Football League of Kosovo table, three points below the play-off spot and four points below the direct promotion places.
