= Visar Berisha =

Kosovan footballer

Personal information
- Date of birth: 7 December 1986 (age 39)
- Place of birth: Suva Reka, SFR Yugoslavia
- Height: 1.81 m (5 ft 11 in)
- Position: Centre-back

Team information
- Current team: Drenica

Youth career
- –2006: Liria Prizren

Senior career*
Years	Team	Apps	(Gls)
2006–2010	Prishtina		
2009	→ Winterthur (loan)	9	(1)
2009–2010	→ Schaffhausen (loan)	21	(1)
2010–2011	Schaffhausen	15	(0)
2013–2015	Ballkani		
2015–2017	Liria	12	(0)
2017–2018	Drenica	15	(2)
2018–2022	Ballkani	74	(5)
2022–2023	Liria		
2023–	Drenica		
- * Club domestic league appearances and goals as of 19 January 2022

Visar Berisha (born 7 December 1986) is a Kosovan professional footballer who plays as a centre-back for Kosovo First League club Drenica.

== International career ==
=== Albania ===
Berisha was expected to be called up by the Albania national team after his good performances with Schaffhausen, but due to the rupture of the ligaments of his right knee, he lost the chance to be called up from Albania, but also to be transferred to Swiss club Grasshoppers.

=== Kosovo ===
On 22 January 2018, Berisha received a call-up from Kosovo for the friendly match against Azerbaijan. However, the match was cancelled and therefore he was unable to make his debut.
