= Elon Berisha =

Kosovar manager

Personal information
- Date of birth: 27 July 1994 (age 32)
- Place of birth: Kosovo

Team information
- Current team: Feronikeli (manager)

Youth career
- Years: Team
- Ramiz Sadiku
- Prishtina

Managerial career
- 2020–2022: Ramiz Sadiku
- 2022–2025: Prishtina e Re (Note: Previously known as KF Shkëndija Hajvali, the club changed its name to KF Prishtina e Re in August 2023 after securing promotion to the Kosovo First League.)
- 2025–2026: Malisheva
- 2026–: Feronikeli

Elon Berisha (born 27 July 1994) is a Kosovar professional football coach is the current manager of Football Superleague of Kosovo team Feronikeli.

== Career ==
He started his career as a coach at 26 years old in the Kosovo First League team KF Ramiz Sadiku. He then was appointed manager of KF Prishtina e Re when the club was still called Shkëndija Hajvali, and led them from the Second League to the Kosovo Superleague, achieving two promotions in three seasons. He was sacked on 22 September 2025 but found a new club in the Superleague only two months later when he was appointed as the new coach of KF Malisheva on 5 November 2025. He left the club by mutual agreement after a defeat against his former club Prishtina e Re on 12 April 2026.

Berisha signed for newly promoted Kosovo Superleague club Feronikeli on 18 June 2026 replacing Granit Begolli, who had achieved a second place finish in the 2025-26 Liga e Parë.

== Honours ==
=== Manager ===
Shkëndija Hajvali

- Kosovo Second League: 2022–23

Prishtina e Re

- Kosovo First League: 2024–25

== Managerial statistics ==
As of 7 November 2026

Coaching record by team and tenure
Team	Nat	From	To	Record							
Team	Nat	From	To	P	W	D	L	GF	GA	GD	Win %
Ramiz Sadiku	(Kosovo)	1 July 2018	30 June 2022	54	18	12	24	—N/a	—N/a	—N/a	33.3
Prishtina e Re	(Kosovo)	1 July 2022	22 September 2025	89	68	11	10	—N/a	—N/a	—N/a	76.4
Malisheva	(Kosovo)	5 November 2025	12 April 2026	19	9	4	6	29	19	+10	47.37
Feronikeli	(Kosovo)	18 June 2026	Present	13	4	3	6	11	16	−5	30.77
Total				175	99	30	46	40	35	+5	56.57
