= Thomas Brdarić =

German footballer

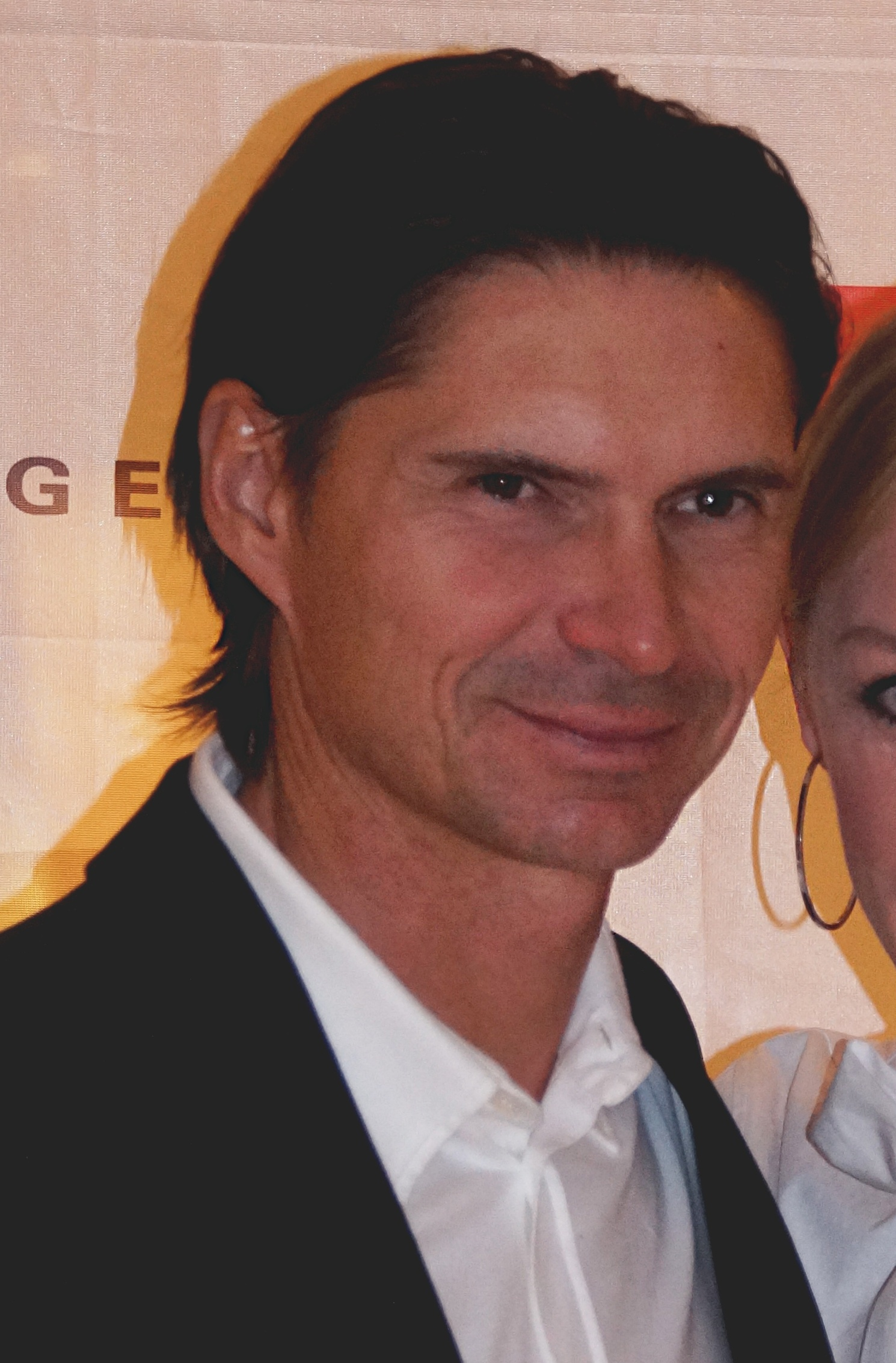
- Brdaric in 2016

Personal information
- Date of birth: 23 January 1975 (age 51)
- Place of birth: Nürtingen, West Germany
- Height: 1.87 m (6 ft 2 in)
- Position: Striker

Team information
- Current team: Al-Bukiryah (manager)

Youth career
- VfB Neuffen
- FV Nürtingen
- Stuttgarter Kickers
- VfL Kirchheim/Teck

Senior career*
Years	Team	Apps	(Gls)
1992–1993	VfL Kirchheim/Teck	12	(4)
1993–1994	VfB Stuttgart (A)	26	(9)
1993–1994	VfB Stuttgart	10	(1)
1994–1996	Fortuna Düsseldorf	30	(1)
1996–1999	Fortuna Köln	80	(24)
1999–2004	Bayer Leverkusen	82	(14)
2003–2004	→ Hannover 96 (loan)	28	(12)
2004–2005	VfL Wolfsburg	32	(12)
2005–2008	Hannover 96	42	(15)
Total		342	(102)

International career
1993–1998	Germany U21	12	(3)
2002–2005	Germany	8	(1)

Managerial career
- 2009: 1. FC Union Solingen
- 2013–2014: TSG Neustrelitz
- 2014–2015: VfL Wolfsburg II
- 2015–2017: TSV Steinbach
- 2017: Shkëndija
- 2017–2018: Tennis Borussia Berlin
- 2018–2019: Rot-Weiß Erfurt
- 2020−2022: Vllaznia
- 2022−2023: Chennaiyin
- 2023: Al-Arabi
- 2024−2025: Vllaznia
- 2025−2026: Drenica
- 2026: Malisheva
- 2026−: Al-Bukiryah
Medal record
Germany
Third place	FIFA Confederations Cup	2005
- * Club domestic league appearances and goals

Thomas Brdarić (Croatian pronunciation: [tômaz bř̩darit͡ɕ]; born 23 January 1975) is a German professional football coach and former player who played as a striker. He is the manager of Saudi First Division club Al-Bukiryah.

== Early life ==
Brdarić's father hails from Zagreb and his mother hails from Novi Sad.

== Club career ==
Brdarić was born in Nürtingen, Baden-Württemberg. He began his professional career with VfB Stuttgart, making his Bundesliga debut as a substitute for Fritz Walter on 29 August 1993 against Bayern Munich. In only his second game, against SG Wattenscheid 09, he scored his first goal in a 4–2 victory. He managed ten games in total in his debut season, but did not manage to keep his place in the squad as he was sold onto Fortuna Düsseldorf in the 2. Bundesliga.

He spent two seasons at the Rheinland club, helping them gain promotion to the top flight and maintaining their position. However, he managed just a solitary goal in his time and was again let go, back to the 2. Bundesliga with rivals Fortuna Köln. His spell here was much more successful as he became a first-team regular and found his finishing touch, particularly in 1998–99 when he managed 13 goals in 29 appearances.

This form caught the eye of Bundesliga club Bayer Leverkusen and they snapped him up in summer 1999. Although he never scored regularly in his time there, he mostly managed to hold down a first team place and enjoyed playing on the biggest stage of his career. During his time with the club, he twice finished second in the league and appeared in the 2002 DFB-Pokal final, and most prestigiously, the UEFA Champions League final that year, where they were defeated by Real Madrid after their shock run in the tournament. Brdarić played 18 games in the UEFA Champions League in total, scoring once (in a 3–1 win over Juventus in the 2002 campaign).

Brdarić's time with Leverkusen though began to wilt soon into the 2002–03 season, which even saw him playing for their amateurs in the Regionalliga North. The following season he was loaned out to fellow Bundesliga team Hannover 96 and managed 12 goals, his best tally yet at the top level.

This attracted VfL Wolfsburg in July 2004, signing for him €1 million in a three-year deal. Although he matched the previous season's tally of 12, this was a much more frustrating season as he found himself often substituted or starting on the bench. These annoyances caused him to fall out with teammates and club officials. Team manager Thomas Strunz labelled Brdarić an "egotist" for putting his own issues before the team.

After this turbulent year, he was quickly sold onto Hannover 96, rejoining the team he had been loaned to on a permanent three-year deal. However, controversy had not fully escaped him as he irked coach Peter Neururer with an interview in which he stated: "As a striker, you have some sort of lust for scoring. That's why a 4–4 with four goals scored by yourself is more important than a win for the team". This led to Brdarić being dropped and subsequently given limited playing opportunities.

This awkward situation was solved though by Neururer's sacking in August 2006, which he welcomed by unleashing criticism at his former coach, branding him "mean and dishonest" in their relationship and claiming he lacked the substance behind his front to aid the club. His time at the club then was much less fractious under Dieter Hecking and he managed five goals in just 11 appearances in the 2006–07 season, where he was blighted by knee problems. His injured knee forced him eventually to end his career as player.

== International career ==
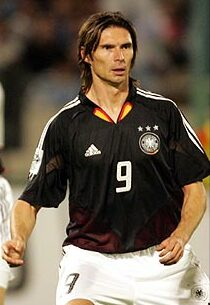
Brdarić with Germany in 2004

Brdarić has also represented his country, making his international debut for Germany on 27 March 2002 against the USA in Rostock. He featured in the 2004 UEFA European Championship, making a substitute appearance against Latvia in the group stage. He was also an unused squad member in the 2005 Confederations Cup. His only international goal came in a friendly win in Iran on 9 October 2004.

== Coaching career ==
On 24 March 2009, Brdarić was named as the new director of sport and later also as manager for 1. FC Union Solingen. He was fired on 17 August 2009. He was appointed manager of TSG Neustrelitz in 2013, and led the team to the 2013–14 Regionalliga Nordost title before losing in the promotion play-offs against FSV Mainz 05 II. He then took over as manager of VfL Wolfsburg II.

In May 2017 he left Shkëndija.

On 10 August 2020, Brdaric signed for Albanian team Vllaznia. He won the 2020–21 Albanian Cup, the club's first title in 13 years.

After managing in India and Kuwait, he returned to Vllaznia on 26 April 2024. He was sacked on 13 May 2025 despite finishing second in the 2024–25 Kategoria Superiore.

On 9 December 2025, he signed as manager of Kosovar club Drenica. His first game in charge was a 2–1 win against Ferizaj in the 17th week of the 2025–26 Kosovo Superleague.

After achieving survival with Drenica, he signed for fellow Kosovar club Malisheva on 20 June 2026.

After winning five of the first seven games of the 2026-27 Football Superleague of Kosovo with Malisheva, Brdaric left the club to sign for Saudi First Division club Al-Bukiryah on 7 October 2026.

== Personal life ==
In 2003, Brdarić recorded a CD entitled "The Wild 13". The song (co-written by Coastland Records' Marco Heggen) mocks goalkeepers Oliver Kahn, Jens Lehmann and Frank Rost. The title stems from Brdarić's shirt number.

During his time at Fortuna Köln, he was nicknamed 'Bambi' because of his very skinny legs.

He is married to wife Antje and has two sons, Tim and Lance.

== Honours ==
Vllaznia

- 2020–21 Albanian Cup
