= Veton Tusha =

Kosovan footballer (born 2002)

Personal information
- Date of birth: 29 December 2002 (age 23)
- Place of birth: Kaçanik, Kosovo under UN administration
- Height: 1.74 m (5 ft 9 in)
- Position: Centre-forward

Team information
- Current team: Celje
- Number: 25

Youth career
- 2008–2017: New Star Football School
- 2017–2018: Arsenal Football School
- 2018–2019: Vardar
- 2020–2021: Denizlispor

Senior career*
Years	Team	Apps	(Gls)
2021–2022	Denizlispor	23	(2)
2022	Termalica	3	(0)
2022–2023	Ballkani	14	(1)
2023–2024	Dinamo	17	(0)
2024-2026	Drita	60	(11)
2026-	Celje	0	(0)

International career
2017–2019	Kosovo U17	7	(2)
2019	Kosovo U19	3	(0)
2021–2024	Kosovo U21	14	(2)
- * Club domestic league appearances and goals as of 22 June 2026

Veton Tusha (born 29 December 2002) is a Kosovan professional footballer who plays as a centre-forward for club Celje.

== Club career ==
=== Denizlispor ===
On 15 January 2021, Tusha signed his first professional contract with Super Lig side Denizlispor after agreeing to a three-and-a-half-year deal and received squad number 25. His debut with Denizlispor came five days later against Galatasaray after coming on as a substitute at 46th minute in place of Hadi Sacko and scored his side's only goal during a 6–1 away deep defeat.

=== Termalica ===
On 18 February 2022, Tusha joined Ekstraklasa side Bruk-Bet Termalica Nieciecza, after agreeing to a one-and-a-half-year deal. His debut with Termalica came a day later in a 0–0 home draw against Legia Warsaw after coming on as a substitute at 81st minute in place of Samuel Štefánik.

=== Ballkani ===
On 2 September 2022, Tusha signed a three-year contract with Football Superleague of Kosovo club Ballkani. Six days later, he was named as a Ballkani substitute for the first time in a 2022–23 UEFA Europa Conference League group stage match against CFR Cluj.

== International career ==
=== Under-17 ===
On 19 November 2017, Tusha was named as part of the Kosovo U17 squad for 2017 Aegean Mercedes Cup. A day later, he made his debut with Kosovo U17 in 2017 Aegean Mercedes Cup match against the host Turkey U17 after coming on as a substitute.

=== Under-19 ===
On 7 November 2019, Tusha was named as part of the Kosovo U19 squad for 2020 UEFA European Under-19 Championship qualifications. Six days later, he made his debut with Kosovo U19 in a match against Russia U19 after coming on as a substitute at 60th minute in place of Adonis Aliu.

=== Under-21 ===
On 15 March 2021, Tusha received a call-up from Kosovo U21 for the friendly matches against Qatar U23. Eleven days later, he made his debut with Kosovo U21 in first match against Qatar U23 after being named in the starting line-up.

== Career statistics ==
As of match played 29 July 2025

Appearances and goals by club, season and competition
Club	Season	League			National cup (Note: Includes Turkish Cup, Kosovar Cup, Albanian Cup)		Europe		Other		Total	
Club	Season	Division	Apps	Goals	Apps	Goals	Apps	Goals	Apps	Goals	Apps	Goals
Denizlispor	2020–21	Süper Lig	11	2	0	0	—		—		11	2
Denizlispor	2021–22	TFF 1. Lig	12	0	1	0	—		—		13	0
Denizlispor	Total		23	2	1	0	—		—		24	2
Bruk-Bet Termalica	2021–22	Ekstraklasa	3	0	—		—		—		3	0
Ballkani	2022–23	Kosovo Superleague	13	1	0	0	2 (Note: Appearances in UEFA Conference League)	0	1 (Note: Appearance in Kosovar Supercup)	0	16	1
Ballkani	2023–24	Kosovo Superleague	1	0	0	0	4 (Note: One appearance in UEFA Champions League, three appearances in UEFA Europa Conference League)	0	0	0	5	0
Ballkani	Total		14	1	0	0	6	0	1	0	21	1
Dinamo	2023–24	Kategoria Superiore	17	0	1	0	—		—		18	0
Drita	2024–25	Kosovo Superleague	33	6	5	1	6	1	—		44	8
Drita	2025–26	Kosovo Superleague	0	0	0	0	4 (Note: Appearances in UEFA Champions League)	1	—		4	1
Drita	Total		33	6	5	1	10	2	0	0	48	9
Career total			90	9	7	1	16	2	1	0	114	12

== Honours ==
Ballkani

- Kosovo Superleague: 2022–23

Drita

- Kosovo Superleague: 2024–25

Individual

- Kosovo Superleague "Star of the Week" Award: 2024–25 (Round 29)
