= Arsim Abazi =

Kosovar footballer and manager

Personal information
- Full name: Arsim Abazi
- Date of birth: 28 November 1972 (age 53)
- Place of birth: Ferizaj, SFR Yugoslavia
- Height: 1.87 m (6 ft 2 in)
- Position: Defender

Team information
- Current team: Ferizaj (manager)

Senior career*
Years	Team	Apps	(Gls)
1997–2000	Sloga Jugomagnat	22	(1)
2000–2001	Vardar	28	(0)
2001–2003	Malatyaspor	34	(0)
2003–2008	Ferizaj		
Total		84	(1)

International career
2002–2005	Kosovo	3	(0)

Managerial career
- 2013: Trepça '89
- 2014: Ferizaj
- 2016–2017: Ferizaj
- 2021–2023: Kosovo U17
- 2023–2025: Ferizaj
- 2026: Dinamo Ferizaj
- 2026–: Ferizaj
- * Club domestic league appearances and goals

Arsim Abazi (born 28 November 1972) is a Kosovan professional football coach and former player who is the current manager of Ferizaj.

== Club career ==
In 1997, Abazi was transferred to Macedonian First Football League club Sloga Jugomagnat and appeared 22 times and scored one goal. Besides being part of Sloga Jugomagnat, he was also part of Macedonian First Football League rivals Vardar (2000–2001) and Malatyaspor (2001–2003). During the last five years of his career, he returned to his homeland and joined the Football Superleague of Kosovo club Ferizaj.

== International career ==
On 7 September 2002, Abazi made his debut with Kosovo in a friendly match against Albania after being named in the starting line-up. He was subsequently called up for KTFF 50th Anniversary Cup, held in Northern Cyprus, and played in both tournament matches against host Northern Cyprus as starter and Sápmi as substitute.

== Managerial career ==
Born in Ferizaj, Abazi has spent most of his career as a coach in his hometown club FC Ferizaj. After managing Kosovo national under-17 football team, he guided Ferizaj to promotion to the Football Superleague of Kosovo in 2024. He resigned as manager of FC Ferizaj on 28 September 2025 after losing five of the first seven games of the 2025-26 Football Superleague of Kosovo. He signed for city rivals Dinamo Ferizaj in January 2026 but left the club four months later when the team was top of the table of the second division. He returned to FC Ferizaj on 20 April 2026. In his first game in charge, Ferizaj drew against KF Llapi in the return leg of the semifinal of the 2025-26 Kosovar Cup and qualified for the final, as the team had won in the first leg before his arrival. After three draws and two defeats in his first five league games in charge, Ferizaj were relegated on 17 May 2026. Four days later, they lost the Cup final against KF Dukagjini and Abazi blamed the referees for both the defeat and relegation.
