= Valentin Serebe =

Ivorian footballer

Personal information
- Full name: Valentin Yacabo Serebe
- Date of birth: 12 December 2002 (age 23)
- Place of birth: Ivory Coast
- Height: 1.81 m (5 ft 11 in)
- Position: Forward

Team information
- Current team: Ballkani
- Number: 9

Youth career
- Zoman FC

Senior career*
Years	Team	Apps	(Gls)
–2023	Zoman FC		
2023–2025	CFR Cluj	3	(0)
2023	→ CSU Alba Iulia (loan)	14	(7)
2025	→ Ballkani (loan)	12	(2)
2025–	Ballkani	35	(15)
- * Club domestic league appearances and goals as of 22 June 2026

Valentin Yacabo Serebe (born 12 December 2002) is an Ivorian professional footballer who plays as a forward for Football Superleague of Kosovo club Ballkani.

== Club career ==
In August 2023, Valentin signed with CFR Cluj and was immediately loaned to CSU Alba Iulia in the Romanian third tier, but after a good performances where he scored 7 goals, he was recalled to CFR Cluj in January 2024. He made his debut for CFR Cluj on 21 January 2024, in a 0–1 Liga I loss to FC Botoşani.

== Honours ==
Individual

- Kosovo Superleague Star of the Week: 2025–26 (Week 3 and Week 4)
