= Kreshnik Uka =

Kosovan footballer

Personal information
- Date of birth: 7 January 1995 (age 31)
- Place of birth: Skënderaj, FR Yugoslavia
- Height: 1.80 m (5 ft 11 in)
- Position: Left winger

Team information
- Current team: Malisheva
- Number: 28

Youth career
- –2013: Drenica

Senior career*
Years	Team	Apps	(Gls)
2013–2019	Drenica	+46	(+12)
2019–2024	Prishtina	49	(9)
2021–2022	→ Drenica (loan)	27	(20)
2024–2026	Drenica	+36	(+19)
2026–	Malisheva	3	(4)
- * Club domestic league appearances and goals as of 29 August 2026

Kreshnik Uka (born 7 January 1995) is a Kosovan professional footballer who plays as a left winger for Malisheva.

== Club career ==
=== Drenica ===
Uka was born in Skënderaj, in modern-day Kosovo, and started playing football with local club Drenica. After scoring eight goals and providing four assists in the 2018–19 Football Superleague of Kosovo for Drenica, he signed a three-year contract with FC Prishtina.

=== Prishtina ===
Uka had limited game time at Prishtina and was loaned back to Drenica in January 2021, signing a six-month contract with an option to extend his stay.

=== Loan to Drenica ===
After scoring seven goals in the second half of the 2020–21 Football Superleague of Kosovo and helping Drenica to survive in the top flight, he extended his stay in his hometown club for another season. He started the 2021–22 Football Superleague of Kosovo in top form, helping his team reach first place in mid-October. He finished the season as runner-up in the league's top scorers list with 20 goals, but Drenica ranked sixth, only two points above the relegation play-offs.

During this period he was also recognised individually by the Football Federation of Kosovo, which named him "Star of the Week" for round 9 of the 2021–22 BKT Superleague after he scored twice in a win over Feronikeli.

=== Return to Prishtina ===
Uka signed a new two-year contract with Prishtina in July 2022. Again, he was unable to reproduce in the capital the impressive form he had shown with Drenica. His contract was not extended when it expired in June 2024.

=== Back to Drenica ===
Uka signed again for his hometown club Drenica on 30 June 2024. The team had been relegated for the first time in 2023 and failed in its attempt to win promotion the following season, so the main goal for Uka was to get them back to the top tier. The team achieved that on 11 May 2025.

In the following season, Uka remained one of Drenica's key attacking players and finished the season as the league top scorer with 19 goals, helping the team avoiding relegation.

=== Malisheva ===
On 25 June 2026, he signed for Malisheva. He joined there his manager in his last season in Drenica, Thomas Brdaric, who had been announced five days before.
