= Ajdin Nukić =

Bosnian footballer

Personal information
- Date of birth: 26 November 1997 (age 28)
- Place of birth: Tuzla, Bosnia and Herzegovina
- Position: Right-back

Team information
- Current team: Velež Mostar
- Number: 44

Senior career*
Years	Team	Apps	(Gls)
2017–2018	Slaven Živinice	27	(1)
2018–2024	Tuzla City	150	(11)
2024–2025	Suhareka	26	(0)
2025–	Velež Mostar	36	(1)

International career
2021	Bosnia and Herzegovina	3	(0)
- * Club domestic league appearances and goals as of 13 September 2026

Ajdin Nukić (born 26 December 1997) is a Bosnian professional footballer who plays as a right-back for Bosnian Premier League club Velež Mostar.

== International career ==
Nukić made his debut for the Bosnia and Herzegovina national team on 6 June 2021 in a friendly match against Denmark. He substituted Andrej Đokanović in the 78th minute in a 2–0 away loss.

== Career statistics ==
=== Club ===
As of match played 13 September 2026

Appearances and goals by club, season and competition
Club	Season	League			National cup (Note: Includes Bosnian Cup, Kosovar Cup.)		Continental		Total	
Club	Season	Division	Apps	Goals	Apps	Goals	Apps	Goals	Apps	Goals
Slaven Živinice	2017–18	First League of FBiH	27	1	1	0	—		28	1
Tuzla City	2018–19	Bosnian Premier League	22	2	1	0	—		23	2
Tuzla City	2019–20	Bosnian Premier League	19	1	3	0	—		22	1
Tuzla City	2020–21	Bosnian Premier League	29	1	5	0	—		34	1
Tuzla City	2021–22	Bosnian Premier League	26	1	4	0	—		30	1
Tuzla City	2022–23	Bosnian Premier League	27	1	4	1	4 (Note: Appearances in UEFA Europa Conference League)	0	35	2
Tuzla City	2023–24	Bosnian Premier League	27	5	1	0	—		28	5
Tuzla City	Total		150	11	18	1	4	0	172	12
FC Suhareka	2024–25	Kosovo Superleague	26	0	1	0	—		27	0
Velež Mostar	2025–26	Bosnian Premier League	29	0	6	1	—		35	1
Velež Mostar	2026–27	Bosnian Premier League	7	1	0	0	4	0	11	1
Velež Mostar	Total		36	1	6	1	4	0	46	2
Career total			239	13	26	2	8	0	273	15
