= Yll Hoxha =

Kosovar footballer

Personal information
- Date of birth: 26 December 1987 (age 38)
- Place of birth: Pristina, SFR Yugoslavia
- Height: 1.83 m (6 ft 0 in)
- Position: Midfielder

Team information
- Current team: Liria Prizren
- Number: 99

Youth career
- 2002–2006: Prishtina

Senior career*
Years	Team	Apps	(Gls)
2006–2009	Prishtina	60	(11)
2009–2010	TPS	10	(0)
2010–2012	Hysi	44	(10)
2012–2015	Kukësi	79	(5)
2015–2016	Flamurtari	33	(2)
2016	Vllaznia Shkodër	7	(0)
2017–2021	Feronikeli	110	(5)
2021–2023	Gjilani	60	(0)
2023–2025	Suhareka	29	(0)
2025–	Liria	30	(15)

International career
2010–2014	Kosovo	3	(0)
- * Club domestic league appearances and goals as of 26 June 2025

Yll Hoxha (born 26 December 1987) is a Kosovar professional footballer who plays for Liria Prizren and the Kosovo national team as a midfielder.

== Club career ==
In 2009, he played for Turun Palloseura (TPS) in the Finnish Veikkausliiga, making his league debut against FC Lahti on 31 May 2009.

In the summer of 2009 he signed for Hysi.

On 27 June 2012, Hoxha agreed personal terms and joined newly promoted top flight side Kukësi by penning a two-year contract. He took squad number 20, and played in the second half in club's first ever Albanian Superliga match versus Luftëtari Gjirokastër which ended in a goalless draw.

On 9 July 2015, Hoxha joined fellow Albanian Superliga side Flamurtari Vlorë on a free transfer.

On 1 August 2016, Hoxha official joined Vllaznia Shkodër by signing a two-year contract. He was presented to the media on the very same day. He made his competitive debut with the club on 8 September in the opening league match against Kukësi, which finished in a goalless home draw. On 3 December, after being used briefly during the first part of the season, Hoxha was involved in a hassle with the coach Armando Cungu. After he was excluded from the training session, Hoxha confronted Cungu by saying to him: "What do you have against me? I don't now why you act like this. An angry Cungu responded: "As long as I'm coach here, you shall get no playing time", which led the parties to a brawl. They were separated by the assistant manager Aleksandër Maxhar, and then Hoxha left the training ground. On 16 December, Hoxha officially left the club after terminating his contract by mutual consent. The club also confirmed his departure via a stetament. Hoxha stated that he left the club due to "Cungu injustice".

On 23 December 2016, shortly after his departure from Vllaznia Shkodër, Hoxha returned to Superleague of Kosovo after a five-years hiatus by signing a one-year deal with Feronikeli. He took squad number 99 and during the second part of 2016–17 season scored 4 goals in 14 league appearances as Feronikeli finished 4th.

== International career ==
He made his international debut for Kosovo in its international friendly match against Turkey which ended in a 1–6 home loss.

== Personal life ==
He was married in June 2015 with his partner in a ceremony held in Pristina, Kosovo.

== Career statistics ==
As of 17 November 2017

Club statistics
Club	Season	League			Cup		Europe		Total	
Club	Season	Division	Apps	Goals	Apps	Goals	Apps	Goals	Apps	Goals
TPS	2009	Veikkausliiga	10	0	1	0	—		11	0
Kukësi	2012–13	Albanian Superliga	20	3	9	2	—		29	5
Kukësi	2013–14	Albanian Superliga	30	1	8	1	8 (Note: All appearance(s) in UEFA Europa League)	1	46	3
Kukësi	2014–15	Albanian Superliga	29	1	3	0	2	0	34	1
Kukësi	Total		79	5	20	3	10	1	109	9
Flamurtari Vlorë	2015–16	Albanian Superliga	33	2	5	0	—		38	2
Vllaznia Shkodër	2016–17	Albanian Superliga	7	0	4	2	—		11	2
Feronikeli	2016–17	Football Superleague of Kosovo	14	4	0	0	—		14	4
Feronikeli	2017–18	Football Superleague of Kosovo	14	0	1	0	—		15	0
Feronikeli	Total		28	4	1	0	—		28	4
Career total			157	11	30	5	10	1	197	17
