= Elvis Prençi =

Albanian footballer

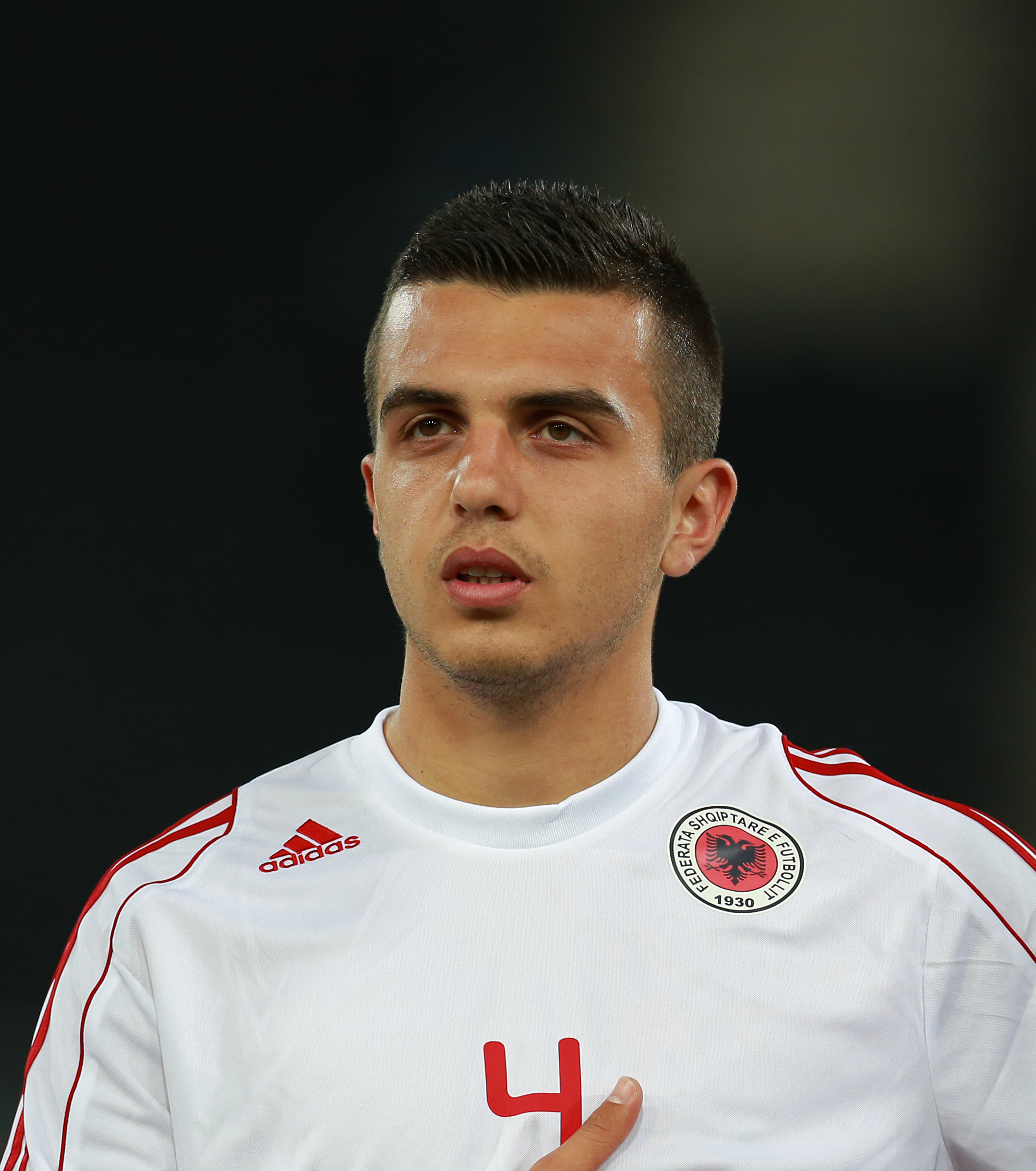

Personal information
- Date of birth: 26 June 1993 (age 33)
- Place of birth: Peshkopi, Albania
- Height: 1.89 m (6 ft 2 in)
- Position: Centre-back

Team information
- Current team: Trepça
- Number: 5

Youth career
- 2005–2011: Tirana

Senior career*
| Years | Team | Apps | (Gls) |
| 2011–2013 | Kukësi | 20 | (2) |
| 2013–2014 | Partizani | 22 | (0) |
| 2014–2015 | Teuta | 6 | (0) |
| 2016–2017 | Korabi | 26 | (1) |
| 2017–2019 | Lushnja | 24 | (1) |
| 2019–2022 | Llapi | 107 | (8) |
| 2022–2025 | Skënderbeu | 91 | (2) |
| 2025–2026 | Prishtina e Re | 35 | (2) |
| 2026– | Trepça | 0 | (0) |

International career
| 2011–2012 | Albania U19 | 3 | (0) |
| 2011–2014 | Albania U21 | 12 | (1) |
- * Club domestic league appearances and goals as of 22 June 2026

Elvis Prençi (born 26 June 1993 in Peshkopi) is an Albanian professional footballer who plays as a centre-back for Trepça.

== Club career ==
Prençi is a product of the KF Tirana academy which he had joined as a child but left in 2011 to join FK Kukësi professional. He played for the side in their successful promotion campaign into the Albanian Superliga during the 2011–12 season where he played in 20 league games scoring 2 goals in the process. The following season FK Kukësi brought in many new faces at the club which meant that spaces were limited for the young players such as Prençi so he left on loan back to the Albanian First Division where he again gained promotion through Partizani Tirana, where his loan spell was extended for the following season where he featured in the top flight for the first time.

In June 2014, Prençi joined Teuta Durrës as a free agent by penning a two-year contract.

Prençi stayed at Teuta only one season. Due to a ligament injury he did not play for next season. In 2016 he signed with the childhood club, Korabi. Prenci played 26 games and scored 1 goal.

Then Prençi signed a 1-year contract with Lushnja where he played 24 matches and scored only 1 goal.

In January 2019, Prençi transferred to Llapi as a free agent. It was part of the first eleven in the first season, and Llapi reached the 3rd position in the Football Superleague of Kosovo. In the season 2019–20 he played 31 matches and scored 1 goal. The 2020–21 season was the most successful for Prençi, as he scored 6 very important goals that helped Llapi to win the Kosovar Cup and Kosovar Supercup.

In August 2026, Prençi signed for Kosovan club Trepça.

== Honours ==
=== Club ===
Llapi

- Kosovar Cup: 2020–21, 2021–22
- Kosovar Supercup: 2021
