= Studençan =

Village in Prizren District, Kosovo

Studençan: Studençan (Albanian); Студенчане (Serbian)
- Village
- Location in Kosovo
- Country: Kosovo
- District: Prizren
- Municipality: Suharekë

Population (2024)
  - Total: 2,486
- Time zone: UTC+1 (CET)
  - Summer (DST): UTC+2 (CEST)

Studençan (Serbian: Studenčane, Serbian Cyrillic: Студенчане) is a village in the municipality of Suva Reka, Kosovo. The new name was given after the Kosovo War. Studençan is close to Suva Reka, 5 km west. The village has approximately 650 houses and over 5000 inhabitants, 2000 of which also live outside of the country for different reasons; work, family, etc., etc. Unemployment issues still affect the village.
