= Artim Pollozhani =

Macedonian footballer

Artim Položani
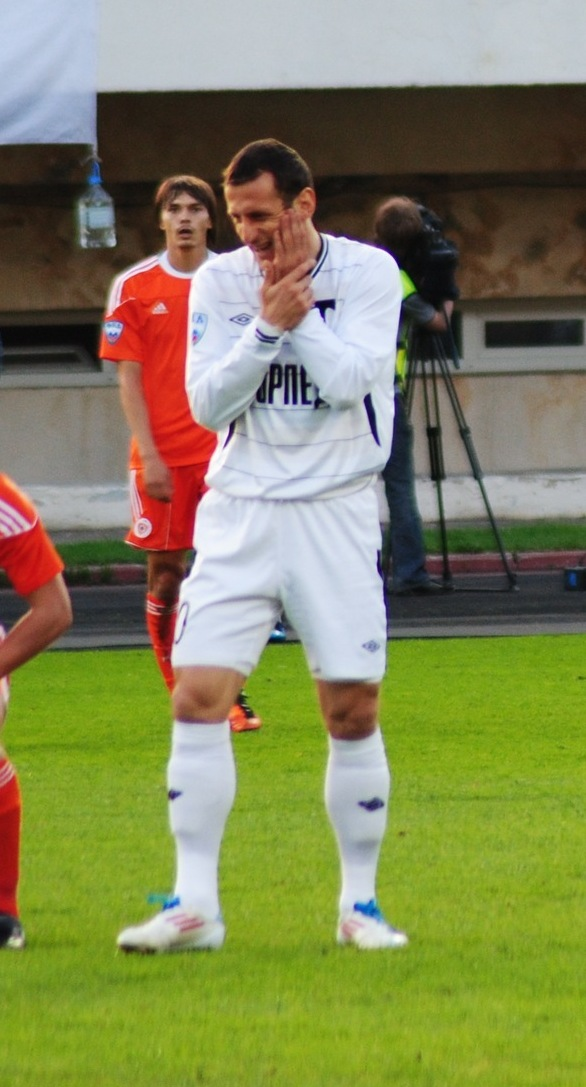

Personal information
- Date of birth: 25 June 1982 (age 44)
- Place of birth: Bidževo, SR Macedonia, SFR Yugoslavia
- Height: 1.80 m (5 ft 11 in)
- Position: Midfielder

Team information
- Current team: Shkëndija

Senior career*
Years	Team	Apps	(Gls)
2000–2002	Apolonia Fier	17	(2)
2002–2003	Dinamo Tirana	21	(1)
2003–2004	Bashkimi	7	(2)
2004–2006	Shkëndija	55	(9)
2006–2007	Makedonija GP	26	(10)
2007–2008	TuS Koblenz	2	(0)
2008	→ Dinamo Tirana (loan)	15	(3)
2008–2009	Vardar	12	(2)
2009–2010	Croatia Sesvete	27	(5)
2010	Vardar	9	(3)
2010	Krylia Sovetov Samara	0	(0)
2011–2012	Torpedo Moscow	25	(1)
2012–2017	Shkëndija	140	(11)
2017–2019	Flamurtari	63	(1)
2019–2020	Skënderbeu	31	(1)

International career
2007–2015	Macedonia	14	(0)

Managerial career
- 2020–2021: Partizani Tirana (assistant)
- 2022–2024: Ballkani (assistant)
- 2024: Ballkani
- 2025: Flamurtari
- 2026–: Shkëndija
- * Club domestic league appearances and goals

Artim Položani or Pollozhani (Albanian: Artim Pollozhani; Macedonian: Артим Положани; born 25 June 1982) is a Macedonian professional football coach and a former player of Albanian descent. He is the current manager of KF Shkëndija.

== Club career ==
Položani joined TuS Koblenz in the German 2. Bundesliga on a three-year contract in June 2007. After recording only two appearances in the first part of 2007–08 season, he was sent on loan at Dinamo Tirana of Albanian Superliga. He played 15 matches and scored 3 goals as Dinamo won the championship. After his loan ended, Položani returned in Macedonia where he signed with Vardar for the 2008–09 season. On 16 June 2010, Položani signed with Russian side FC Krylya Sovetov.

On 7 September 2017, Flamurtari Vlorë manager Shpëtim Duro confirmed that Položani is going to play for the club in the 2017–18 season. The transfer was made official five days later, where he was presented and was given squad number 4. He made his Albanian Superliga appearance on 9 September in the opening matchday against Skënderbeu Korçë which finished in a 0–2 away defeat. Položani concluded his first season by playing 31 league games as the team finished in 6th place despite challenging for the title in mid-season. On 5 July 2018, he signed a new contract for the upcoming season. Položani was named team captain in the beginning of February 2019 following the departure of Tomislav Bušić. His first match as the official captain was the 2–1 home defeat to Kukësi; he scored his first Flamurtari goal with a header in the first half which temporarily leveled the figures. In the second half, he scored an overhead kick, which was disallowed in controversial fashion for dangerous play, which lead Albanian media to draw comparisons to the goal Cristiano Ronaldo scored against Juventus in the 2017–18 UEFA Champions League. During the same match, he was also injured during a duel which resulted in him losing two teeth.

== International career ==
He made his senior debut for Macedonia in a February 2007 friendly match against Albania and has earned a total of 14 caps, scoring no goals. His final international was a March 2015 friendly against Australia.

== Managerial career ==
Pollozhani was assistant manager under Ilir Daja at FK Partizani Tirana and FC Ballkani. He was appointed head coach of the latter on 9 September 2024 after Daja resigned of his post. After a defeat on penalties in the 2024-25 Kosovar Cup against KF Rilindja 1974, he resigned of his post on 4 December 2024.

On 27 March 2025, he was appointed manager of one of his former clubs as a player, Flamurtari Vlorë, with four games remaining of the 2024-25 Kategoria e Parë. He achieved the promotion to Kategoria Superiore on 20 April 2025 after winning away against KF Vora in the last matchday of the season. After the promotion, he left the post as manager and was appointed sporting director. He was dismissed on 9 January 2026.

On 16 July 2026 he was appointed manager of his former club KF Shkëndija.

== Managerial statistics ==
As of 7 November 2026

Team	From	To	Record							
Team	From	To	M	W	D	L	GF	GA	GD	Win %
Ballkani	9 September 2024	4 December 2024	12	5	5	2	18	10	+8	41.67
Flamurtari	26 March 2025	30 June 2025	4	2	1	1	3	2	+1	50.00
Shkëndija	16 July 2026	Present	19	11	4	4	37	17	+20	57.89
Total			35	18	10	7	58	29	+29	51.43

== Honours ==
=== Club ===
Dinamo Tirana

- Albanian Superliga: 2007–08

Shkëndija

- Macedonian Football Cup: 2015–16

=== Individual ===
- Macedonian Domestic Footballer of the Year: 2006
