= Mislav Karoglan =

Bosnian and Croatian football manager (born 1982)

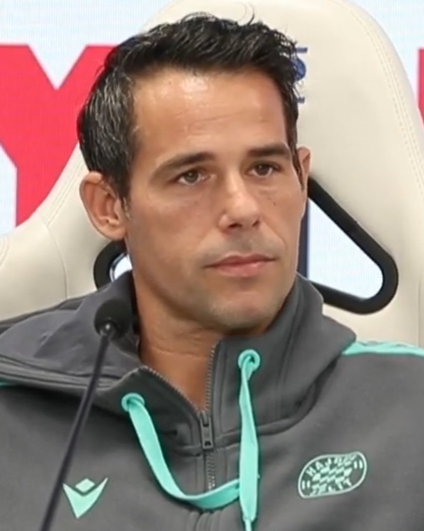
- Karoglan with Hajduk Split in 2024

Personal information
- Date of birth: 14 April 1982 (age 44)
- Place of birth: Imotski, SFR Yugoslavia
- Height: 1.81 m (5 ft 11 in)
- Position: Attacking midfielder

Senior career*
Years	Team	Apps	(Gls)
2001–2003	Posušje		
2003–2004	Kamen Ingrad	12	(0)
2004–2005	Zrinjski Mostar	28	(7)
2005–2006	Hapoel Nazareth Illit	21	(1)
2006–2008	Široki Brijeg	27	(3)
2008–2009	Žilina	5	(0)
2009–2010	Rijeka	4	(0)
2010	→ Široki Brijeg (loan)	10	(1)
2010	→ Imotski (loan)	12	(3)
2011	→ SAFFC (loan)	16	(15)
2011–2013	SAFFC	63	(46)
2014	Imotski		
2014–2016	Kamen Ivanbegovina		

International career
2002–2003	Bosnia and Herzegovina U21	2	(0)

Managerial career
- 2016: Croatia Zmijavci
- 2019: Zadar
- 2019–2021: Hajduk Split U17
- 2022: Hajduk Split (caretaker)
- 2023: Istra 1961
- 2023–2024: Hajduk Split
- 2024–2025: Sheriff Tiraspol
- 2025–2026: Ballkani
- 2026–: Partizani
- * Club domestic league appearances and goals

Mislav Karoglan (born 14 April 1982) is a professional football manager and former player. He is the current head coach of Kategoria Superiore club Partizani.

Born in Imotski, SFR Yugoslavia, present-day Croatia, Karoglan made two appearances for the Bosnia and Herzegovina U21 national team.

== Playing career ==
Karoglan has played for Žilina in the Slovak First Football League. Previously, he played for Široki Brijeg and Zrinjski Mostar in Bosnian Premier League. He also played for Kamen Ingrad in the Croatian Prva HNL. On 20 August 2009, he signed a two-year deal with Croatian side Rijeka.

== Managerial career ==
Karoglan managed Croatia Zmijavci in 2016, leading them to a 9th-placed finish out of 16. In 2022, he was appointed caretaker manager of Hajduk Split.

In the summer of 2023, he was appointed manager of Istra 1961, replacing Gonzalo García who led the club to fifth place in the 2022–23 season. After a disastrous start to the season, he was sacked after only three games in charge.

On 23 October 2023, Karoglan was appointed to replace Ivan Leko as manager of Hajduk Split on a permanent basis. After a series of poor results, resulting in the club losing any chances of winning the league title, Karoglan's contract with Hajduk was terminated on 8 April 2024.

On 5 August 2024, he was appointed manager of Moldovan club Sheriff Tiraspol. Despite not losing any game in the league, he departed the club on 15 April 2025 as Sheriff was in the third position in the table.

On 25 November 2025 Karoglan was appointed manager of Kosovar club FC Ballkani. His first game in charge was a 3–2 away win against reigning league champions FC Drita. He left the club for personal reasons on 26 August 2026.

== Managerial statistics ==
As of match played 7 November 2026

Managerial record by team and tenure
Team	From	To	Record							
Team	From	To	G	W	D	L	GF	GA	GD	Win %
Zadar	16 January 2019	30 June 2019	13	5	2	6	17	16	+1	38.46
Hajduk Split (caretaker)	18 September 2022	31 December 2022	12	8	4	0	26	11	+15	66.67
Istra 1961	11 June 2023	8 August 2023	3	0	1	2	1	10	−9	0.00
Hajduk Split	23 October 2023	8 April 2024	21	12	4	5	33	11	+22	57.14
Sheriff Tiraspol	5 August 2024	15 April 2025	22	14	6	2	52	15	+37	63.64
Ballkani	25 November 2025	26 August 2026	33	16	4	13	54	48	+6	48.48
Partizani Tirana	16 October 2026	Present	5	2	0	3	4	8	−4	40.00
Total			109	57	21	31	187	120	+67	52.29
