= Edison Kqiku =

Kosovo national football player

Personal information
- Date of birth: 16 January 1999 (age 27)
- Place of birth: Gjilan, Kosova
- Height: 1.80 m (5 ft 11 in)
- Position: Midfielder

Team information
- Current team: Llapi
- Number: 17

Senior career*
Years	Team	Apps	(Gls)
2016–2017	Hajvalia	13	(1)
2017–2026	Gjilani	175	(4)
2026-	Llapi	0	(0)

International career^{‡}
2017–2018	Kosovo U19	7	(0)
2019–2020	Kosovo U21	3	(0)
- * Club domestic league appearances and goals as of 20 July 2026 ‡ National team caps and goals as of 04:49, 19 September 2023 (UTC)

Edison Kqiku (born 16 January 1999) is a Kosovo football player who plays as a midfielder for Llapi.

== Career ==
Kqiku, who started his career in KF Hajvalia, one of the Kosovo Superliga teams, made his debut against FC Drita in the 5th week of the 2016–17 season.

Kqiku scored the first goal of his professional career from the penalty spot in the 31st minute of the match against KF Feronikeli on 17 March 2017, in a 6-1 defeat. Kqiku played in 13 matches in the 2016/2017 season and scored 1 goal

Kqiku joined the SC Gjilani team in the 2017–18 season. On 31 May 2021, he extended his contract with Gijilani until 2024. On 23 June 2022, he fractured his fibula in his right leg, requiring surgery.

== International career ==
Kqiku played 7 times in total for the Kosovo national team in the 2017/2018 season, 6 times in the U19European Championship Qualifications. Kqiku was selected for the Kosovo national team in the 2019–20 season
