= KF Prishtina e Re =

Prishtina e Re
- Full name: Klubi Futbollistik Prishtina e Re
- Short name: PRE
- Founded: 2017; 9 years ago as SHF Shkëndija Hajvali; May 2020; 6 years ago as KF Shkëndija Hajvali; 11 August 2023; 2 years ago as KF Prishtina e Re
- Ground: FFK National Educational Camp
- Capacity: 4,000
- Coordinates: 42.62677°N 21.18656°E
- Owner: Rrustem Pacolli
- Chairman: Driton Gashi
- Manager: Qëndrim Kida
- League: Kosovo Superleague
- 2025–26: Kosovo Superleague, 10th of 10 (relegated)

Klubi Futbollistik Prishtina e Re (transl. Football Club Prishtina e Re), commonly known as Prishtina e Re, is a professional football club based in the village Hajvalia of Pristina, Kosovo. From 2025–26 season the club plays in the Kosovo Superleague, the top tier of football in the country.

== History ==
KF Prishtina e Re was founded in 2017 under the name SHF Shkëndija Hajvali (Shkolla e Futbollit Shkëndija Hajvali). The club took its original name from the local primary school in the village of Hajvalia, located near Pristina. In the 2020–21 season, the club decided to expand its activities beyond youth levels and enter senior competitions. This decision came after securing a permanent sponsorship deal with M-Technologie, a company that is part of the Mabetex Group that had previously sponsored football in this village by sponsoring Hajvalia.

The club initially competed in the third league, which is the fourth tier of football in Kosovo and in its inaugural season, the club earned promotion to the second league (third tier). On 11 August 2023, following promotion to the first league (second tier), the club changed its name to KF Prishtina e Re. Although initially thought to be a breakaway from the historic FC Prishtina, the name actually derives from a nearby residential complex of the same name.

== Players ==
=== Current squad ===
As of 7 February 2026

Note: Flags indicate national team as defined under FIFA eligibility rules; some limited exceptions apply. Players may hold more than one non-FIFA nationality.

No.	Pos.	Nation	Player
1	GK	BRA	Maycon Morales
4	DF	MNE	Adrijan Rudović
5	DF	ALB	Elvis Prençi (captain)
7	FW	KOS	Lorik Dobratiqi
8	MF	KOS	Arlind Shabani
9	FW	KOS	Astrit Berisha
10	FW	GNB	Toni Gomes
11	DF	KOS	Leart Zekolli
12	GK	KOS	Florjan Smakiqi
13	MF	CIV	Cheick Doukouré
18	MF	KOS	Ergyn Ahmeti
20	DF	KOS	Donat Hasanaj
21	DF	KOS	Ermal Vitija
22	FW	KOS	Rion Rushiti

No.	Pos.	Nation	Player
23	MF	NGA	Amos Dadet
24	DF	KOS	Endrit Morina
25	MF	ALB	Erisildo Smaçi
28	FW	KOS	Anik Vitija
30	MF	KOS	Endrit Baholli
33	DF	KOS	Arbër Prekazi
44	DF	KOS	Adonis Zeqiri
77	FW	KOS	Drilon Fazliu
82	FW	TOG	Elom Nya-Vedji
86	MF	BIH	Nedim Mekić
88	FW	MKD	Florijan Kadriu
89	FW	BEL	Ibrahim Kargbo Jr.
90	GK	KOS	Zigur Biqkaj
92	DF	SVN	Dejan Trajkovski
