= FC Suhareka =

Football club in Kosovo

- Full name: Klub Futbollistik Suhareka
- Founded: 5 June 2023; 2 years ago
- Ground: Boka-Boka Stadium, Korishë
- Capacity: 1,500
- Owner: Local investors: Adrian Hoxhaj; Avni Aliaj; Edi Berisha; Fadil Bytyqi; Jetmir Bytyqi
- Chairman: Rrustem Aliaj
- Manager: Mirel Josa
- League: Kosovo Superleague
- 2023–24: Kosovo First League – Group A, 1st of 10 (promoted)
- Website: fcsuhareka.com

Football Club Suhareka (Albanian: Klubi Futbollistik Suhareka), commonly known as Suhareka, is a football club based in Suva Reka, Kosovo. The club plays in the Superleague of Kosovo, which is the top tier of football in the country.

== History ==
On 5 June 2023, FC Suhareka was founded by several investors who had previously invested in FC Ballkani. Thirteen days later, an extraordinary joint meeting between KF A&N and FC Suhareka was held at the Boka-Boka Stadium in Korishë and it was decided that from the 2023–24 Kosovo First League they would merge and compete under the name FC Suhareka.

== Players ==
=== Current squad ===
As of 17 June 2025

Note: Flags indicate national team as defined under FIFA eligibility rules; some limited exceptions apply. Players may hold more than one non-FIFA nationality.

No.	Pos.	Nation	Player
1	GK	(Kosovo) KOS	Betim Halimi
2	DF	(Kosovo) KOS	Donat Hasanaj
4	DF	(Albania) ALB	Hysen Memolla
5	DF	(Bosnia and Herzegovina) BIH	Kemal Osmanković
6	MF	(Belgium) BEL	Andi Koshi
7	MF	(Kosovo) KOS	Lorik Boshnjaku
8	MF	(Kosovo) KOS	Fitim Susuri
9	FW	(Kosovo) KOS	Mevlan Zeka (vice-captain)
10	MF	(Kosovo) KOS	Endrit Krasniqi
12	GK	(Kosovo) KOS	Eurolind Avdimetaj
13	DF	(Albania) ALB	Rudolf Turkaj
14	FW	(Kosovo) KOS	Adem Maliqi

No.	Pos.	Nation	Player
17	MF	(Switzerland) SUI	Argtim Ismaili
18	MF	(Kosovo) KOS	Arvanit Rexhaj
20	FW	(Kosovo) KOS	Destan Bytyqi
21	DF	(Kosovo) KOS	Fuad Ajvazi
22	MF	(Albania) ALB	Eneid Kodra
23	FW	(Bosnia and Herzegovina) BIH	Ajdin Nukić
26	GK	(Turkey) TUR	Oytun Özdoğan
27	FW	(Kosovo) KOS	Drin Ymeri
30	MF	(Kosovo) KOS	Liridon Fetahaj
70	FW	(Montenegro) MNE	Alden Škrijelj
88	DF	(Montenegro) MNE	Nikola Stijepović
99	DF	(Kosovo) KOS	Yll Hoxha (captain)
