= Elton Basriu =

Albanian footballer

Personal information
- Full name: Elton Basriu
- Date of birth: 3 August 1987 (age 39)
- Place of birth: Elbasan, Albania
- Position: Centre back

Team information
- Current team: Dukagjini
- Number: 5

Youth career
- Elbasani

Senior career*
Years	Team	Apps	(Gls)
2006–2007	Elbasani	3	(0)
2007–2008	Butrinti	20	(1)
2008–2009	Sopoti	7	(1)
2009–2010	Gramshi	25	(0)
2010–2011	Apolonia	18	(0)
2011–2012	Tërbuni	22	(1)
2012–2013	Gramshi	23	(0)
2013–2016	Bylis	37	(2)
2014–2015	→ Elbasani (loan)	14	(0)
2016–2017	Kamza	22	(1)
2017–2018	Liria Prizren	17	(0)
2018–2019	Trepça'89	30	(0)
2019–	Dukagjini	196	(1)
- * Club domestic league appearances and goals as of 22 June 2026

Elton Basriu (born 3 August 1987 in Elbasan) is an Albanian professional footballer who plays for KF Dukagjini in the Football Superleague of Kosovo.
