= FC Ballkani =

Football club in Kosovo

Ballkani
- Full name: Football Club Ballkani
- Nickname: Xhebrailat (The Gabriels)
- Founded: 1947; 79 years ago as Rinia
- Stadium: Theranda City Stadium
- Capacity: 3,000
- President: Arsim Kabashi
- Head coach: Sami Sermaxhaj
- League: Kosovo Superleague
- 2025–26: Kosovo Superleague, 3rd of 10
- Website: fcballkani.com
Home colours	Away colours	Third colours

Football Club Ballkani (Albanian: Klubi Futbollistik Ballkani), commonly known as Ballkani, is a professional football club based in Suhareka, Kosovo. The club plays in the Kosovo Superleague, which is the top tier of football in the country.

On 25 August 2022, after a victory over Shkupi of North Macedonia, Ballkani made history by qualifying for the group stages of the Europa Conference League; becoming the first ever side from Kosovo to reach the group stages of a UEFA club competition. The following year, they managed to repeat the same achievement and qualified for the 2023–24 edition.

== History ==
The club was established in 1947 under the name Rinia by some athletes whose purpose was to participate in various competitions and tournaments that were organized at that time. In 1952, the club was registered and started competing in official championships. In 1965, it changed the name from KF Rinia to KF Ballkani after Suhareka Chemical and Rubber Industry took the ownership of the club.

The club progressively climbed the Yugoslav league system reaching the Kosovo Provincial League in the season 1973–74. They were relegated, but returned in 1977 and remained in the league until the 1990s. Ballkani was one of the first clubs in Kosovo to leave the league system managed by the Football Association of Yugoslavia, and played instead in the not officially recognized parallel First League of Kosovo until 2000.

In the league organized by the Football Federation of Kosovo, Ballkani played its first match against Liria at Studençan. In the youth levels of Ballkani, many prominent players from Suhareka started their careers, such as Ali Elshani, Arsim Llapatinca, Avni Bytyçi, Bekim Suka, Dervish Shala, Esheref Berisha, Fillim Guraziu, Gafurr Kabashi, Hajrush Berisha, Hevzi Shalaj, Isuf Asllanaj, Isuf Kolgeci, Lulzim Kolgeci, Musli Bylykbashi, Naser Berisha, Nexhat Elshani, Osman Ramadani, Rexhep Kuçi, Salih Hoxha, Urim Bylykbashi, Visar Berisha and many others who made a valuable contribution to the affirmation of football as well as other human values and some still give their contribution to football pitches as managers and in various sports posts.

After years of competing in the top tier of Kosovan football, Ballkani won their first league title in the 2021–22 season. Under the management of Ilir Daja, the team secured the trophy with several games remaining in the season. The club successfully defended their title in the 2022–23 and 2023–24 seasons, marking a period of domestic hegemony.

== Stadium ==
The club plays its home matches at the Theranda City Stadium is a multi-purpose stadium in Suhareka, Kosovo. The stadium has a capacity of 1,500 people all-seater. However, for their inaugural European campaign, home matches were played in Pristina at the Fadil Vokrri Stadium, as the city's stadium in Suhareka did not meet UEFA requirements.

== Honours ==
=== Domestic ===
- (Kosovo) Superliga e Kosovës
  - Winners (3): 2021–22, 2022–23, 2023–24
- (Kosovo) Kupa e Kosovës
  - Winners (1): 2023–24
  - Runners-up (1): 2019–20
- (Kosovo) Superkupa e Kosovës
  - Winners (2): 2022, 2024
  - Runners-up(1): 2023

== Players ==
=== Current squad ===
As of 1 September 2026

Note: Flags indicate national team as defined under FIFA eligibility rules; some limited exceptions apply. Players may hold more than one non-FIFA nationality.

No.	Pos.	Nation	Player
1	GK	KOS	Ardit Nika
4	DF	KOS	Gentrit Halili
5	MF	BIH	Anel Šabanadžović
6	DF	ALB	Diar Vokrri
8	MF	KOS	Toni Domgjoni
9	FW	CIV	Valentin Serebe
10	MF	BRA	Giovanni
11	FW	ALG	Walid Hamidi
12	DF	CIV	Abou Dosso
13	GK	KOS	Ideal Bytyqi
15	DF	KOS	Redon Zekaj
16	MF	KOS	Erlis Xhemajli
17	FW	KOS	Ardi Maksutaj
18	DF	KOS	Lendrit Shala
19	MF	KOS	Engjëll Ajazaj
20	MF	MNE	Edvin Kuč (captain)

No.	Pos.	Nation	Player
27	FW	ALB	Dijar Nikqi
28	DF	CRO	Ivica Batarelo
29	MF	SEN	Albert Diène
30	MF	KOS	Almedin Klinaku
31	GK	TUR	Kaan Karagöz
32	DF	KOS	Bajram Jashanica (vice-captain)
33	MF	KOS	Leonis Murseli
34	DF	KOS	Merlind Kodra
37	MF	ALB	Arens Mateli
44	GK	ALB	Gentian Selmani
45	MF	KOS	Adonis Hoti
88	MF	KOS	Leart Popaj
93	GK	KOS	Art Miftari
98	FW	KOS	Jetmir Topalli
99	FW	KOS	Albin Berisha

=== Out on loan ===
Note: Flags indicate national team as defined under FIFA eligibility rules; some limited exceptions apply. Players may hold more than one non-FIFA nationality.

No.	Pos.	Nation	Player
92	DF	ALB	Elmando Gjini (at AF Elbasani until 30 June 2027)
—	FW	GAM	Ebrima Gaye (at Arsimi until 30 June 2027)

== Personnel ==
As of 19 January 2026

Current technical staff
Position	Name
Head coach	(Kosovo) Sami Sermaxhaj
Assistant coach	(Bulgaria) Radostin Aleksandrov
Assistant coach	(Kosovo) Edon Gashi
Assistant coach	(Kosovo) Ardi Kabashi
Conditional coach	(Kosovo) Alban Shala
Goalkeeping coach	(Kosovo) Valon Babatinca
Video analysis	(Kosovo) Ardi Kabashi
Management
Sporting Director	(North Macedonia) Nderim Nexhipi
Manager officer	(Kosovo) Idriz Hajrizi
Administrator	(Kosovo) Florim Elshani
Secretary	(Kosovo) Arben Osmani
Lawyer	(Kosovo) Ismail Selimi
Coordinator of football school	(Kosovo) Driton Mamaj
Marketing and Media Director	(Kosovo) Kushtrim Reshitaj
Information officer Marketing and media officer	(Kosovo) Jetullah Kuçi
Security officer	(Kosovo) Blerim Kuçi
Scoutings	(Kosovo) Ismet Maksutaj
Scoutings	(Kosovo) Astrit Bekteshi
Medical Staff
Physiotherapist	(Kosovo) Krenar Zenelaj
Physiotherapist	(Kosovo) Arianit Bytyçi
Doctor	(Kosovo) Hadi Hasanaj
Technical Staff
Kitmanager	(Kosovo) Meriton Kryeziu
Cashier	(Kosovo) Arbenita Sejdaj
Operational Support	(Kosovo) Lirim Lezi
Board members
Office	Name
President	(Kosovo) Arsim Kabashi
Vice President	(Kosovo) Visar Maksutaj

== List of managers ==
- (Kosovo) Bekim Shotani (Feb 2018–2 Sep 2018)
- (Kosovo) Sami Sermaxhaj (6 Sep 2018 – 14 Apr 2019)
- (Kosovo) Gani Sejdiu (16 Apr 2019–Jun 2019)
- (Kosovo) Ismet Munishi (8 Jun 2019–December 2020)
- (Kosovo) Ardian Basha (Dec 2020 – Feb 2021)
- (Albania) Bledi Shkëmbi (4 Jan 2021 – 6 May 2021)
- (Kosovo) Bekim Isufi (Jul 2021 – Dec 2021)
- (Albania) Ilir Daja (5 Jan 2022 – 2 Sep 2024)
- (North Macedonia) Artim Položani (9 Sep 2024 – 4 Dec 2024)
- (Albania) Orges Shehi (6 Dec 2024 – 19 November 2025)
- (Bosnia and Herzegovina) Mislav Karoglan (25 Nov 2025 – 26 Aug 2026)
- (Kosovo) Sami Sermaxhaj (27 Aug 2026 –)

== Ballkani in Europe ==
Ballkani achieved a historic milestone for Kosovan football during the 2022–23 UEFA Europa Conference League. After being eliminated in the UEFA Champions League first qualifying round by Žalgiris, the team moved to the Conference League. They defeated La Fiorita, KÍ Klaksvík, and Shkupi in the qualifying rounds, becoming the first club from Kosovo to reach the group stage of a UEFA club competition.

In the 2022–23 group stage, Ballkani was drawn into Group G alongside Slavia Prague, CFR Cluj, and Sivasspor, finishing the group with 4 points.

The club repeated this achievement in the 2023–24 UEFA Europa Conference League. After elimination from the Champions League qualifiers by Ludogorets Razgrad, Ballkani again advanced through the Conference League qualifying rounds, defeating Larne, Lincoln Red Imps, and BATE Borisov to reach the group stage for a second consecutive year.

=== By competition ===
Fully up to date as of match played 30 July 2026

Competition	Pld	W	D	L	GF	GA	GD	Win%
UEFA Champions League	6	2	1	3	6	9	−3	33.33
UEFA Conference League	36	18	5	13	60	41	+19	50.00
Total	42	20	6	16	66	50	+16	47.62

=== Matches ===
Season	Competition	Round	Opponent	Home	Away	Agg.
2022–23	UEFA Champions League	1Q	(Lithuania) Žalgiris	1–1	0–1 (a.e.t.)	1–2
2022–23	UEFA Europa Conference League	2Q	(San Marino) La Fiorita	6–0	4–0	10–0
2022–23	UEFA Europa Conference League	3Q	(Faroe Islands) KÍ	3–2	1–2 (a.e.t.)	4–4 (4–3 p)
2022–23	UEFA Europa Conference League	PO	(North Macedonia) Shkupi	1–0	2–1	3–1
2022–23	UEFA Europa Conference League	GS	(Czech Republic) Slavia Prague	0–1	2–3	4th
2022–23	UEFA Europa Conference League	GS	(Romania) CFR Cluj	1–1	0–1	4th
2022–23	UEFA Europa Conference League	GS	(Turkey) Sivasspor	1–2	4–3	4th
2023–24	UEFA Champions League	1Q	(Bulgaria) Ludogorets Razgrad	2–0	0–4	2–4
2023–24	UEFA Europa Conference League	2Q	(Northern Ireland) Larne	3–0	4–1	7–1
2023–24	UEFA Europa Conference League	3Q	(Gibraltar) Lincoln Red Imps	2–0	3–1	5–1
2023–24	UEFA Europa Conference League	PO	(Belarus) BATE Borisov	4–1	0–1	4–2
2023–24	UEFA Europa Conference League	GS	(Croatia) Dinamo Zagreb	2–0	0–3	4th
2023–24	UEFA Europa Conference League	GS	(Czech Republic) Viktoria Plzeň	0–1	0–1	4th
2023–24	UEFA Europa Conference League	GS	(Kazakhstan) Astana	1–2	0–0	4th
2024–25	UEFA Champions League	1Q	(Andorra) UE Santa Coloma	1–2 (a.e.t.)	2–1	3–3 (5–6 p)
2024–25	UEFA Conference League	2Q	(Malta) Ħamrun Spartans	0–0	2–0	2–0
2024–25	UEFA Conference League	3Q	(Northern Ireland) Larne	0–1	1–0	1–1 (1–4 p)
2025–26	UEFA Conference League	2Q	(Malta) Floriana	4–2	1–1	5–3
2025–26	UEFA Conference League	3Q	(Republic of Ireland) Shamrock Rovers	1–0	0–4	1–4
2026–27	UEFA Conference League	1Q	(Wales) Connah's Quay Nomads	3–2	0–0	3–2
2026–27	UEFA Conference League	2Q	(Republic of Ireland) Bohemians	3–2 (a.e.t.)	1–2	4–4 (4–5 p)
