= KF Dukagjini =

Football club in Kosovo

- Full name: Klubi Futbollistik Dukagjini Klinë
- Nickname: Hithat (The Nettles)
- Founded: 1958; 68 years ago
- Ground: Stadiumi "18 Qershori" ("18 June" Stadium)
- Capacity: 3,000
- President: Fabian Veseli
- Manager: Armend Dallku
- League: Kosovo Superleague
- 2025–26: Kosovo Superleague, 4th of 10
- Website: https://www.kfdukagjini.com/
Home colours	Away colours

KF Dukagjini (Albanian: Klubi Futbollistik Dukagjini Klinë) is a professional football club based in the city of Klina, Kosovo. The club compete in the top tier of football in Kosovo the Kosovo Superleague. They won the 2025-26 Kosovar Cup defeating FC Ferizaj 2-1 in the final.

== Players ==
=== Current squad ===
As of 1 September 2026

Note: Flags indicate national team as defined under FIFA eligibility rules; some limited exceptions apply. Players may hold more than one non-FIFA nationality.

No.	Pos.	Nation	Player
1	GK	KOS	Egzon Lekaj
2	DF	KOS	Denis Hyseni
4	DF	KOS	Ardin Dallku
5	DF	ALB	Elton Basriu (captain)
6	MF	KOS	Arvanit Rexhaj
7	FW	KOS	Granit Elezaj
8	MF	KOS	Kushtrim Gashi
9	FW	KOS	Kron Thaçi
10	FW	KOS	Altin Mërlaku (vice-captain)
11	FW	KOS	Redon Syla
14	DF	KOS	Egzon Sinani
17	MF	KOS	Mërgim Pefqeli
20	MF	KOS	Gentrit Salihu
22	DF	ALB	Arbër Bytyqi

No.	Pos.	Nation	Player
23	FW	SRB	Iljasa Zulfiu
27	MF	KOS	Valentin Hoti
30	GK	KOS	Kenan Haxhihamza
33	DF	BRA	Luan
44	DF	KOS	Tun Bardhoku
47	MF	KOS	Dienit Isufi
66	MF	SRB	Engjëll Sylejmani
77	MF	BRA	Vitor Hugo
87	GK	KOS	Loris Mrijaj
88	FW	KOS	Erjon Krasniqi
90	FW	GHA	Sumaila Abubakari
98	FW	KOS	Meris Maliqi
99	FW	HAI	Jeudi Stevenson

=== Out on loan ===
Note: Flags indicate national team as defined under FIFA eligibility rules; some limited exceptions apply. Players may hold more than one non-FIFA nationality.

No.	Pos.	Nation	Player
15	DF	KOS	Alpi Shahini (at Tefik Çanga until 30 June 2027)
18	MF	KOS	Lendrit Palucaj (at Rilindja 1974 until 30 June 2027)

No.	Pos.	Nation	Player
21	DF	KOS	Hektor Krasniqi (at Admira Wacker II until 30 June 2027)
—	GK	KOS	Roland Myrtaj (at Rilindja 1974 until 30 June 2027)

== List of managers ==
- (Republic of Kosova) Rafet Prekazi (1993–1995)
- (North Macedonia) Xhengis Rexhepi (20 June 2019–27 October 2019)
- (Kosovo) Severin Elezaj (28 October 2019–6 October 2020)
- (Kosovo) Armend Dallku (8 October 2020–)

== European record ==
As of match played 29 July 2026

Season	Competition	Round	Club	Home	Away	Agg.
2023–24	UEFA Europa Conference League	1QR	(Gibraltar) Europa	2–1	3–2	5–3
2023–24	UEFA Europa Conference League	2QR	(Croatia) Rijeka	0–1	1–6	1–7
2026–27	UEFA Conference League	2QR	(Switzerland) Lugano	1–5	0–1	1–6

- QR: Qualifying round

== Honours ==
KF Dukagjini honours
Type	Competition	Titles	Seasons/Years
Domestic	Independent League of Kosovo	1	1993–94
Domestic	Kosovar Cup	1	2025–26
