= KF Malisheva =

Association football club in Kosovo

Malisheva
- Full name: Klubi i Futbollit Malisheva
- Founded: 2016; 10 years ago
- Ground: Liman Gegaj Stadium
- Capacity: 1,800
- Chairman: Driton Morina
- Manager: Vacant
- League: Kosovo Superleague
- 2025–26: Kosovo Superleague, 2nd of 10
- Website: fcmalisheva.com
Home colours	Away colours

Klubi Futbollistik Malisheva (transl. Football Club Malisheva), commonly known as Malisheva, is a professional football club based in Malisheva, Kosovo. Their home ground is Liman Gegaj Stadium which has a seating capacity of 1,800. The club plays in the Kosovo Superleague, which is the top tier of football in the country.

== History ==
FC Malisheva, established in 2016 began as a football school dedicated to nurturing young talent. Due to the overwhelming interest from local youth, the school transformed into a competitive club. Initially competing in the Kosovo Third League, the club quickly rose through the ranks, advancing to the Kosovo Second League by the 2018–19 season. Their ascent continued as they qualified for the Kosovo First League. In the 2020–21 season, FC Malisheva won the First League, earning promotion to the Kosovo Superleague for the 2021–22 season. Currently, FC Malisheva fields both senior and U21 teams in the Superleague and operates a football school with around 200 young footballers competing in age groups from U9 to U17 in the Prizren Regional League.

Malisheva finished in the top-4 of the Football Superleague of Kosovo in three seasons in a row: fourth in 2023-24, third in 2024-25 and second in 2025-26. Two young players who had a big impact in that Golden Era left the club to sign for important clubs abroad: Drilon Hazrollaj was announced at Rapid Bucuresti on 29 March 2025 for a fee reported to be around 800.000 euros, and Etnik Brruti signed for Hajduk Split on 29 May 2026 on a free transfer.

== Players ==
=== Current squad ===
As of 1 September 2026

Note: Flags indicate national team as defined under FIFA eligibility rules; some limited exceptions apply. Players may hold more than one non-FIFA nationality.

No.	Pos.	Nation	Player
1	GK	KOS	Ilir Avdyli
2	DF	KOS	Arlind Veliu
3	DF	ALB	Omer Bajraktari
4	MF	KOS	Ardian Sopaj
5	DF	KOS	Dreni Kryeziu (captain)
6	DF	MKD	Besnik Ferati
7	FW	KOS	Kreshnik Uka
8	MF	ALB	Mark Bushaj
9	FW	KOS	Krenar Dulaj
10	FW	KOS	Laurent Xhylani
11	MF	KOS	Lorent Talla (on loan from Rio Ave U23)
12	FW	KOS	Etnik Kryeziu
13	MF	KOS	Korab Luma

No.	Pos.	Nation	Player
17	FW	AZE	Vusal Isgandarli
18	FW	MKD	Valmir Nafiu
19	MF	KOS	Enis Neziri
20	DF	KOS	Arbër Pira
22	FW	ALB	Rimal Haxhiu
23	GK	KOS	Enes Morina
25	GK	BIH	Adnan Kanurić
27	DF	DEN	Andreas Skovgaard
28	MF	CMR	Robert Mathieu Ndjigi
30	DF	KOS	Donart Vitija
33	DF	MKD	Rexhep Murati
55	FW	ALB	Keslin Shani
99	FW	MKD	Xhemal Ibishi

== European record ==
Season	Competition	Round	Opponent	Home	Away	Agg.
2024–25	UEFA Conference League	1Q	(Montenegro) Budućnost Podgorica	1–0	0−3	1−3
2025–26	UEFA Conference League	1Q	(Iceland) Víkingur Reykjavík	0−1	0−8	0−9
2026–27	UEFA Conference League	1Q	(Albania) Vllaznia Shkodër	5−0	1−2	6−2
2026–27	UEFA Conference League	2Q	(Scotland) Hibernian	2–0	1−4	3−4

== See also ==
- List of football clubs in Kosovo
