= 2023–24 CS Universitatea Craiova season =

Universitatea Craiova
2023–24 season
- Manager: Laurențiu Reghecampf (26 July–19 September); Corneliu Papură (caretaker, 21 September–7 November); Ivaylo Petev (7 November–10 April); Constantin Gâlcă (from 17 April)
- Superliga Regular season: 4th
- Superliga Championship round: 3rd
- Europe play-offs: Winners
- Cupa României: Quarter-finals
- Top goalscorer: League: Alexandru Mitriță (16); All: Alexandru Mitriță (16)
- Biggest win: Universitatea Craiova 5–1 Botoșani
- Biggest defeat: FCSB 3–0 Universitatea Craiova

The 2023–24 campaign was the 76th season in the history of CS Universitatea Craiova, and their 10th consecutive season in Liga I, the top tier of Romanian football. The club also competed in the Cupa României, where they were eliminated in the quarter-finals. The season featured significant managerial changes; on September 19, head coach Laurențiu Reghecampf resigned to assume a position with Saudi Pro League club Al-Tai. Later, on April 10, Bulgarian manager Ivaylo Petev was dismissed from his duties following consecutive, decisive defeats in both the domestic cup and league competitions.

== Transfers ==
=== In ===
Pos.	Player	Transferred from	Fee	Date	Source
FW	(Romania) Alexandru Mitriță	(United States) New York City FC		1 July 2023	
MF	(Slovenia) Jasmin Kurtić	(Italy) Parma		8 August 2023	
MF	(France) Lyes Houri	(Hungary) Videoton FC Fehérvár		29 August 2023	
FW	(Finland) Pyry Soiri	(Finland) HJK Helsinki		30 December 2023	
MF	(Georgia (country)) Anzor Mekvabishvili	(Georgia (country)) Dinamo Tbilisi		19 January 2024	
FW	(Spain) Jalen Blesa	(Kosovo) FC Prishtina		13 February 2024	

=== Out ===
Pos.	Player	Transferred to	Fee	Date	Source
DF	(Romania) Valerică Găman	(Romania) Hermannstadt	End of contract	1 July 2023	
MF	(Slovenia) Jasmin Kurtić	(Italy) Südtirol		5 January 2024	
FW	(Romania) Atanas Trică	(Romania) CS Tunari	Loan	18 January 2024	
MF	(Croatia) Ante Roguljić	(Romania) Universitatea Cluj	Loan	24 January 2024	

== Competitions ==
=== Overall record ===
Competition	First match	Last match	Starting round	Final position	Record							
Competition	First match	Last match	Starting round	Final position	Pld	W	D	L	GF	GA	GD	Win %
Superliga Regular season	17 July 2023	10 March 2024	Matchday 1	4th	30	13	10	7	47	38	+9	43.33
Superliga Championship round	16 March 2024	18 May 2024	Matchday 1	3rd	10	6	1	3	18	14	+4	60.00
Europe play-offs	26 May 2024		First leg	Winners	1	0	1	0	1	1	+0	0.00
Cupa României	27 September 2023	4 April 2024	Group stage	Quarter-finals	4	2	1	1	6	2	+4	50.00
Total					45	21	13	11	72	55	+17	46.67

Source: Competitions

=== Superliga ===
==== Regular season ====
Pos	Team	Pld	W	D	L	GF	GA	GD	Pts	Qualification
2	Rapid București	30	15	10	5	55	32	+23	55	Qualification to play-off round
3	CFR Cluj	30	15	8	7	54	29	+25	53	Qualification to play-off round
4	Universitatea Craiova	30	13	10	7	47	38	+9	49	Qualification to play-off round
5	Farul Constanța	30	11	10	9	37	38	−1	43 (Note: Head to head points: Farul Constanța 6, Sepsi OSK 0)	Qualification to play-off round
6	Sepsi OSK	30	12	7	11	43	34	+9	43	Qualification to play-off round

Source: , Soccerway
Rules for classification: 1) Points; 2) Head-to-head points; 3) Head-to-head goal difference; 4) Head-to-head goals scored; 5) Goal difference; 6) Goals scored; 7) Play-off.

===== Results by round =====
Round	1	2	3	4	5	6	7	8	9	10	11	12	13	14	15	16	17	18	19	20	21	22	23	24	25	26	27	28	29	30
Ground	A	H	A	H	A	H	A	A	H	A	H	A	H	A	H	H	A	H	A	H	A	H	H	A	H	A	H	A	H	A
Result	W	D	D	W	W	W	L	L	W	D	W	D	L	L	D	W	W	W	L	D	D	L	L	W	D	D	W	W	D	W
Position																														

A = Away; H = Home; W = Win; D = Draw; L = Loss

==== Matches ====
17 July 2023 1	Dinamo București	0–2	Universitatea Craiova

24 July 2023 2	Universitatea Craiova	0–0	Oțelul Galați

30 July 2023 3	CFR Cluj	1–1	Universitatea Craiova

4 August 2023 4	Universitatea Craiova	1–0	Hermannstadt

12 August 2023 5	Politehnica Iași	1–4	Universitatea Craiova

18 August 2023 6	Universitatea Craiova	3–0	UTA Arad

27 August 2023 7	Farul Constanța	2–0	Universitatea Craiova

2 September 2023 8	FCSB	3–0	Universitatea Craiova

16 September 2023 9	Universitatea Craiova	2–1	Sepsi OSK

23 September 2023 10	Universitatea Cluj	1–1	Universitatea Craiova

1 October 2023 11	Universitatea Craiova	5–1	Botoșani

7 October 2023 12	Voluntari	0–0	Universitatea Craiova

22 October 2023 13	Universitatea Craiova	1–3	Petrolul Ploiești

29 October 2023 14	Rapid București	2–0	Universitatea Craiova

4 November 2023 15	Universitatea Craiova	1–1	FC U Craiova 1948

12 November 2023 16	Universitatea Craiova	1–0	Dinamo București

26 November 2023 17	Oțelul Galați	1–3	Universitatea Craiova

2 December 2023 18	Universitatea Craiova	1–0	CFR Cluj

10 December 2023 19	Hermannstadt	2–1	Universitatea Craiova

16 December 2023 20	Universitatea Craiova	2–2	Politehnica Iași

20 December 2023 21	UTA Arad	2–2	Universitatea Craiova

21 January 2024 22	Universitatea Craiova	1–2	Farul Constanța

28 January 2024 23	Universitatea Craiova	0–3	FCSB

4 February 2024 24	Sepsi OSK	1–3	Universitatea Craiova

9 February 2024 25	Universitatea Craiova	2–2	Universitatea Cluj

18 February 2024 26	Botoșani	2–2	Universitatea Craiova

26 February 2024 27	Universitatea Craiova	2–1	Voluntari

29 February 2024 28	Petrolul Ploiești	2–3	Universitatea Craiova

4 March 2024 29	Universitatea Craiova	1–1	Rapid București

10 March 2024 30	FC U Craiova 1948	1–2	Universitatea Craiova

==== Championship round ====
Pos	Team	Pld	W	D	L	GF	GA	GD	Pts	Qualification
1	FCSB (C)	10	5	2	3	12	11	+1	49	Qualification to Champions League first qualifying round
2	CFR Cluj	10	6	1	3	19	14	+5	46	Qualification to Conference League second qualifying round
3	Universitatea Craiova (O)	10	6	1	3	18	14	+4	44	Qualification to European competition play-offs
4	Farul Constanța	10	4	2	4	19	20	−1	36	
5	Sepsi OSK	10	3	3	4	17	17	0	34	
6	Rapid București	10	1	1	8	13	22	−9	32	

Source: Soccerway, FRF (in Romanian), LPF (in Romanian)
Rules for classification: 1) Points; 2) Points without rounding; 3) Points in the regular season; 4) Head-to-head points; 5) Head-to-head goal difference; 6) Head-to-head goals scored; 7) Goal difference; 8) Goals scored; 9) Play-off (only if needed to decide champion or teams for UEFA competitions). (Note: only criteria 7 and 8 are applied to establish the classification during the competition.)
(C) Champions; (O) Play-off winners

Round	1	2	3	4	5	6	7	8	9	10
Ground	A	H	A	H	A	H	A	H	A	H
Result	W	W	L	L	W	L	W	W	D	W
Position										

A = Away; H = Home; W = Win; D = Draw; L = Loss

16 March 2024 1	CFR Cluj	1–2	Universitatea Craiova

30 March 2024 2	Universitatea Craiova	2–1	Rapid București

7 April 2024 3	FCSB	2–0	Universitatea Craiova

12 April 2024 4	Universitatea Craiova	1–2	Farul Constanța

21 April 2024 5	Sepsi OSK	1–3	Universitatea Craiova

25 April 2024 6	Universitatea Craiova	0–1	CFR Cluj

29 April 2024 7	Rapid București	1–2	Universitatea Craiova

6 May 2024 8	Universitatea Craiova	2–0	FCSB

13 May 2024 9	Farul Constanța	3–3	Universitatea Craiova

18 May 2024 10	Universitatea Craiova	3–2	Sepsi OSK

==== Europe play-offs ====
26 May 2024	Universitatea Craiova	1–1 (a.e.t.) (5–4 p)	Universitatea Cluj

=== Cupa României ===
==== Group stage ====
27 September 2023 1	Tunari	1–1	Universitatea Craiova

1 November 2023 2	UTA Arad	0–1	Universitatea Craiova

4 December 2023 3	Universitatea Craiova	4–0	Farul Constanța

==== Knockout stage ====
4 April 2024 Quarter-finals	Universitatea Craiova	0–1 (a.e.t.)	Oțelul Galați
