= 2024–25 UEFA Conference League =

European club football competition

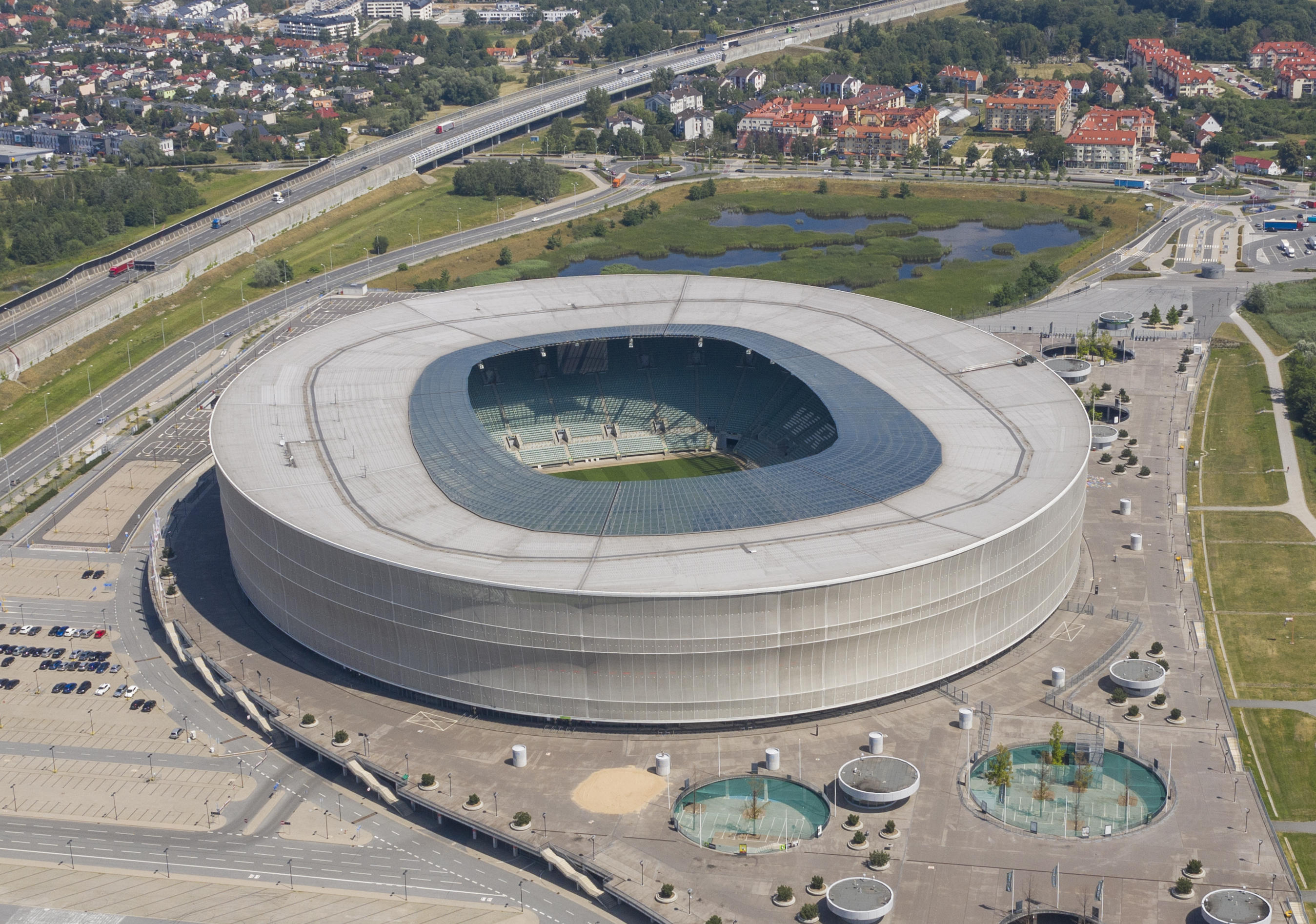
- The Wrocław Stadium in Wrocław hosted the final

Tournament details
- Dates: Qualifying: 10 July – 29 August 2024; Competition proper: 2 October 2024 – 28 May 2025
- Teams: Competition proper: 24+12; Total: 110+54 (from 54 associations)

Final positions
- Champions: (England) Chelsea (1st title)
- Runners-up: (Spain) Real Betis

Tournament statistics
- Matches played: 153
- Goals scored: 451 (2.95 per match)
- Attendance: 2,068,045 (13,517 per match)
- Top scorer(s): (Democratic Republic of the Congo) Afimico Pululu (Jagiellonia Białystok); 8 goals
- Best player: (Spain) Isco (Real Betis)
- Best young player: (Norway) Tobias Gulliksen (Djurgårdens IF)

The 2024–25 UEFA Conference League was the fourth season of the UEFA Conference League, Europe's tertiary club football tournament organised by UEFA.

From this season, the competition was renamed from the UEFA Europa Conference League to the UEFA Conference League. This was also the first edition of the tournament played under a new format involving a 36-team league phase. This increased the total number of matches played in the competition proper from 141 to 153. The new format also did not allow teams to transfer from the Europa League league or knockout phase to the Conference League knockout phase, and thus Conference League winners (Olympiacos in the 2023–24 edition) could no longer defend their title as the winner of the Conference League automatically qualified for the Europa League league phase.

The final was played at the Wrocław Stadium in Wrocław, Poland, between Chelsea and Real Betis, with Chelsea winning the match 4–1. The victory made Chelsea the first club to win all four major European trophies, including all three of the current European competitions. Chelsea’s triumph marked the first English team to beat a Spanish team in a European final since Liverpool defeated Alavés in the 2001 UEFA Cup final.

== Association team allocation ==
A total of 164 teams from 54 of the 55 UEFA member associations participated in the 2024–25 UEFA Conference League. The association ranking based on the UEFA association coefficients was used to determine the number of participating teams for each association:

- Associations 1–12 each had one team.
- Associations 13–33 and 51–55 (except Russia) each had two teams.
- Associations 34–50 each had three teams (except Liechtenstein, which had one).
- 14 teams eliminated from the 2024–25 UEFA Champions League and 41 teams eliminated from the 2024–25 UEFA Europa League were transferred to the Conference League.

=== Association ranking ===
For the 2024–25 UEFA Conference League, the associations were allocated places according to their 2023 UEFA association coefficients, which took into account their performance in European competitions from 2018–19 to 2022–23.

Apart from the allocation based on the association coefficients, associations could have additional teams participating in the Conference League, as noted below:

- (UCL) – Additional teams transferred from the UEFA Champions League
- (UEL) – Additional/vacated teams transferred from/to the UEFA Europa League

Association ranking for 2024–25 UEFA Conference League

Rank	Association	Coeff.	Teams	Notes
1	England	109.570	1	
2	Spain	92.998	1	
3	Germany	82.481	1	
4	Italy	81.926	1	
5	France	61.164	1	
6	Netherlands	59.900	1	
7	Portugal	56.216	1	
8	Belgium	42.200	1	+1 (UEL)
9	Scotland	36.400	1	+2 (UEL)
10	Austria	34.000	1	+2 (UEL)
11	Serbia	32.375	1	+3 (UEL)
12	Turkey	32.100	1	+1 (UEL)
13	Switzerland	31.675	2	+2 (UEL)
14	Ukraine	29.500	2	+1 (UEL)
15	Czech Republic	29.050	2	
16	Norway	29.000	2	+1 (UEL)
17	Denmark	27.825	2	+1 (UEL)
18	Russia	26.215	0	
19	Croatia	25.400	2	+1 (UEL)

Rank	Association	Coeff.	Teams	Notes
20	Greece	25.225	2	–1 (UEL) +1 (UEL)
21	Israel	25.000	2	+1 (UEL)
22	Cyprus	24.475	2	+2 (UEL)
23	Sweden	23.750	2	
24	Poland	20.750	2	+2 (UEL)
25	Hungary	20.625	2	+1 (UEL)
26	Romania	20.500	2	+1 (UEL)
27	Bulgaria	20.000	2	+1 (UEL)
28	Slovakia	19.750	2	+1 (UEL)
29	Azerbaijan	16.625	2	+1 (UEL)
30	Kazakhstan	12.625	2	+1 (UCL) +1 (UEL)
31	Slovenia	12.500	2	+2 (UEL)
32	Moldova	12.250	2	+2 (UEL)
33	Kosovo	11.041	2	+1 (UCL) +1 (UEL)
34	Liechtenstein	11.000	1	
35	Latvia	10.625	3	
36	Republic of Ireland	10.375	3	+1 (UEL)
37	Finland	10.250	3	+1 (UCL)
38	Lithuania	10.000	3	+1 (UEL)

Rank	Association	Coeff.	Teams	Notes
39	Armenia	9.875	3	+1 (UCL)
40	Belarus	9.875	3	+1 (UEL)
41	Bosnia and Herzegovina	9.750	3	+1 (UEL)
42	Luxembourg	9.000	3	+1 (UCL)
43	Faroe Islands	8.750	3	+1 (UEL)
44	Northern Ireland	8.583	3	+1 (UCL)
45	Malta	8.250	3	+1 (UCL)
46	Georgia	8.000	3	+1 (UCL)
47	Estonia	7.582	3	+1 (UCL)
48	Iceland	7.250	3	+1 (UCL)
49	Albania	6.250	3	+1 (UCL)
50	Wales	6.166	3	+1 (UEL)
51	Gibraltar	5.791	2	+1 (UEL)
52	North Macedonia	5.500	2	+1 (UCL)
53	Andorra	5.165	2	+1 (UEL)
54	Montenegro	4.750	2	+1 (UCL)
55	San Marino	1.999	2	+1 (UCL)

=== Distribution ===
The following is the access list for this season.

		Teams entering in this round	Teams advancing from previous round	Teams transferred from Champions League	Teams transferred from Europa League
First qualifying round (50 teams)		9 domestic cup winners from associations 47–55; 21 domestic league runners-up from associations 34–55 (except Liechtenstein); 20 domestic league third-placed teams from associations 30–50 (except Liechtenstein)			
Second qualifying round (98 teams)	Champions Path (12 teams)			12 teams eliminated from Champions League first qualifying round	
Second qualifying round (98 teams)	League Path (86 teams)	13 domestic cup winners from associations 34–46; 17 domestic league runners-up from associations 16–33 (except Russia); 15 domestic league third-placed teams from associations 13–29 (except Russia and title holders); 9 domestic league fourth-placed teams from associations 7–15; 1 domestic league fifth-placed team from association 6	25 winners from the first qualifying round		6 teams eliminated from Europa League first qualifying round
Third qualifying round (60 teams)	Champions Path (8 teams)		6 winners from the second qualifying round (Champions Path)	2 teams eliminated from Champions League first qualifying round	
Third qualifying round (60 teams)	League Path (52 teams)		43 winners from the second qualifying round (League Path)		9 teams eliminated from Europa League second qualifying round
Play-off round (48 teams)	Champions Path (10 teams)		4 winners from the third qualifying round (Champions Path)		6 teams eliminated from Europa League third qualifying round (Champions Path)
Play-off round (48 teams)	League Path (38 teams)	5 domestic league sixth-placed teams from associations 1–5 (EFL Cup winners for England)	26 winners from the third qualifying round (League Path)		7 teams eliminated from Europa League third qualifying round (League Path)
League phase (36 teams)			5 winners from the play-off round (Champions Path); 19 winners from the play-off round (League Path)		12 teams eliminated from Europa League play-off round
Knockout phase play-offs (16 teams)			16 teams ranked 9–24 from the league phase		
Round of 16 (16 teams)			8 teams ranked 1–8 from the league phase; 8 winners from the knockout phase play-offs		

The information here reflects the ongoing suspension of Russia in European football, and so the following changes to the default access list were made:

- The cup winners of associations 39 to 44 (Armenia, Belarus, Bosnia and Herzegovina, Luxembourg, Faroe Islands and Northern Ireland) entered the second qualifying round instead of the first qualifying round.
- As a result of corresponding changes to the Champions League access list, there was one fewer loser from the Champions League first qualifying round transferred to the Conference League second qualifying round (Champions Path) so one transferred team received a bye to the third qualifying round (Champions Path).

As the Champions League title holders (Real Madrid) qualified for the Champions League via their domestic league's standard berth allocation, the following changes to the default access list were made:

- As a result of corresponding changes to the Champions League access list, there was one fewer loser from the Champions League first qualifying round (two fewer in total) transferred to the Conference League second qualifying round (Champions Path), so one transferred team (two in total) received a bye to the third qualifying round (Champions Path).

As the Europa Conference League title holders (Olympiacos) entered the Europa League, the berth they qualified for via league position (Conference League second qualifying round) was vacated, and the following changes to the default access list were made:

- The cup winners of associations 45 (Malta) and 46 (Georgia) entered the second qualifying round instead of the first qualifying round.

=== Teams ===
The labels in the parentheses show how each team qualified for the place of its starting round:

- CW: Domestic cup winners
- 2nd, 3rd, 4th, 5th, 6th, etc.: League position of the previous season
- LC: League cup winners
- RW: Regular season winners
- PW: End-of-season Conference League play-offs winners
- UCL: Transferred from the Champions League
  - Q1: Losers from the first qualifying round
- UEL: Transferred from the Europa League
  - PO: Losers from the play-off round
  - CH/MP Q3: Losers from the third qualifying round (Champions/Main Path)
  - Q2: Losers from the second qualifying round
  - Q1: Losers from the first qualifying round

The second qualifying round, third qualifying round and play-off round were divided into Champions Path (CH) and Main Path (MP).

Qualified teams for 2024–25 UEFA Conference League
Entry round		Teams			
League phase		(Scotland) Heart of Midlothian (UEL PO)	(Austria) LASK (UEL PO)	(Austria) Rapid Wien (UEL PO)	(Serbia) TSC (UEL PO)
League phase		(Switzerland) Lugano (UEL PO)	(Norway) Molde (UEL PO)	(Cyprus) APOEL (UEL PO)	(Poland) Jagiellonia Białystok (UEL PO)
League phase		(Moldova) Petrocub Hîncești (UEL PO)	(Republic of Ireland) Shamrock Rovers (UEL PO)	(Belarus) Dinamo Minsk (UEL PO)	(Bosnia and Herzegovina) Borac Banja Luka (UEL PO)
Play-off round	CH	(Slovenia) Celje (UEL CH Q3)	(Lithuania) Panevėžys (UEL CH Q3)	(Faroe Islands) KÍ (UEL CH Q3)	(Wales) The New Saints (UEL CH Q3)
Play-off round	CH	(Gibraltar) Lincoln Red Imps (UEL CH Q3)	(Andorra) UE Santa Coloma (UEL CH Q3)		
Play-off round	MP	(England) Chelsea (6th)	(Spain) Real Betis (7th)	(Germany) 1. FC Heidenheim (8th)	(Italy) Fiorentina (8th)
Play-off round	MP	(France) Lens (7th)	(Belgium) Cercle Brugge (UEL MP Q3)	(Serbia) Partizan (UEL MP Q3)	(Turkey) Trabzonspor (UEL MP Q3)
Play-off round	MP	(Switzerland) Servette (UEL MP Q3)	(Ukraine) Kryvbas Kryvyi Rih (UEL MP Q3)	(Croatia) Rijeka (UEL MP Q3)	(Greece) Panathinaikos (UEL MP Q3)
Third qualifying round	CH	(Finland) HJK (UCL Q1)	(Northern Ireland) Larne (UCL Q1)		
Third qualifying round	MP	(Scotland) Kilmarnock (UEL Q2)	(Serbia) Vojvodina (UEL Q2)	(Denmark) Silkeborg (UEL Q2)	(Israel) Maccabi Petah Tikva (UEL Q2)
Third qualifying round	MP	(Poland) Wisła Kraków (UEL Q2)	(Romania) Corvinul Hunedoara (UEL Q2)	(Bulgaria) Botev Plovdiv (UEL Q2)	(Slovakia) Ružomberok (UEL Q2)
Third qualifying round	MP	(Moldova) Sheriff Tiraspol (UEL Q2)			
Second qualifying round	CH	(Kazakhstan) Ordabasy (UCL Q1)	(Kosovo) Ballkani (UCL Q1)	(Armenia) Pyunik (UCL Q1)	(Luxembourg) Differdange 03 (UCL Q1)
Second qualifying round	CH	(Malta) Hamrun Spartans (UCL Q1)	(Georgia (country)) Dinamo Batumi (UCL Q1)	(Estonia) Flora (UCL Q1)	(Iceland) Víkingur Reykjavík (UCL Q1)
Second qualifying round	CH	(Albania) Egnatia (UCL Q1)	(North Macedonia) Struga (UCL Q1)	(Montenegro) Dečić (UCL Q1)	(San Marino) Virtus (UCL Q1)
Second qualifying round	MP	(Cyprus) Pafos (UEL Q1)	(Hungary) Paks (UEL Q1)	(Azerbaijan) Zira (UEL Q1)	(Kazakhstan) Tobol (UEL Q1)
Second qualifying round	MP	(Slovenia) Maribor (UEL Q1)	(Kosovo) Llapi (UEL Q1)	(Netherlands) Go Ahead Eagles (PW)	(Portugal) Vitória de Guimarães (5th)
Second qualifying round	MP	(Belgium) Gent (PW)	(Scotland) St Mirren (5th)	Austria Wien (PW)	(Serbia) Radnički 1923 (5th)
Second qualifying round	MP	(Turkey) İstanbul Başakşehir (4th)	(Switzerland) Zürich (4th)	(Switzerland) St. Gallen (5th)	(Ukraine) Dnipro-1 (4th)
Second qualifying round	MP	(Ukraine) Polissya Zhytomyr (5th)	(Czech Republic) Baník Ostrava (4th)	(Czech Republic) Mladá Boleslav (PW)	(Norway) Brann (2nd)
Second qualifying round	MP	(Norway) Tromsø (3rd)	(Denmark) Brøndby (2nd)	(Denmark) Copenhagen (PW)	(Croatia) Hajduk Split (3rd)
Second qualifying round	MP	(Croatia) Osijek (4th)	(Greece) AEK Athens (2nd)	(Israel) Maccabi Haifa (2nd)	(Israel) Hapoel Be'er Sheva (3rd)
Second qualifying round	MP	(Cyprus) AEK Larnaca (2nd)	(Cyprus) Omonia (3rd)	(Sweden) BK Häcken (3rd)	(Sweden) Djurgårdens IF (4th)
Second qualifying round	MP	(Poland) Śląsk Wrocław (2nd)	(Poland) Legia Warsaw (3rd)	(Hungary) Puskás Akadémia (3rd)	(Hungary) Fehérvár (4th)
Second qualifying round	MP	(Romania) CFR Cluj (2nd)	(Romania) Universitatea Craiova (PW)	(Bulgaria) Cherno More (2nd)	(Bulgaria) CSKA 1948 (PW)
Second qualifying round	MP	(Slovakia) DAC Dunajská Streda (2nd)	(Slovakia) Spartak Trnava (3rd)	(Azerbaijan) Sabah (3rd)	(Azerbaijan) Sumgayit (4th)
Second qualifying round	MP	(Kazakhstan) Astana (2nd)	(Slovenia) Olimpija Ljubljana (3rd)	(Moldova) Zimbru Chișinău (3rd)	(Kosovo) Drita (3rd)
Second qualifying round	MP	(Liechtenstein) Vaduz (CW)	(Latvia) Riga (CW)	(Republic of Ireland) St Patrick's Athletic (CW)	(Finland) Ilves (CW)
Second qualifying round	MP	(Lithuania) TransINVEST (CW)	Ararat-Armenia (CW)	(Belarus) Neman Grodno (CW)	(Bosnia and Herzegovina) Zrinjski Mostar (CW)
Second qualifying round	MP	(Luxembourg) Progrès Niederkorn (CW)	(Faroe Islands) HB (CW)	(Northern Ireland) Cliftonville (CW)	(Malta) Sliema Wanderers (CW)
Second qualifying round	MP	(Georgia (country)) Iberia 1999 (CW)			
First qualifying round		(Kazakhstan) Aktobe (3rd)	(Slovenia) Bravo (4th)	(Moldova) Milsami Orhei (4th)	(Kosovo) Malisheva (4th)
First qualifying round		(Latvia) Auda (3rd)	(Latvia) Liepāja (5th)	(Republic of Ireland) Derry City (2nd)	(Republic of Ireland) Shelbourne (4th)
First qualifying round		(Finland) KuPS (2nd)	(Finland) VPS (PW)	(Lithuania) Žalgiris (2nd)	(Lithuania) Šiauliai (3rd)
First qualifying round		(Armenia) Noah (2nd)	(Armenia) Urartu (4th)	(Belarus) Torpedo-BelAZ Zhodino (3rd)	(Belarus) Isloch Minsk Raion (4th)
First qualifying round		(Bosnia and Herzegovina) Velež Mostar (3rd)	(Bosnia and Herzegovina) Sarajevo (4th)	(Luxembourg) F91 Dudelange (3rd)	(Luxembourg) UNA Strassen (6th)
First qualifying round		(Faroe Islands) Víkingur Gøta (2nd)	(Faroe Islands) B36 (4th)	(Northern Ireland) Linfield (2nd)	(Northern Ireland) Crusaders (PW)
First qualifying round		(Malta) Floriana (2nd)	(Malta) Marsaxlokk (4th)	(Georgia (country)) Dinamo Tbilisi (2nd)	(Georgia (country)) Torpedo Kutaisi (3rd)
First qualifying round		(Estonia) FCI Levadia (2nd)	(Estonia) Tallinna Kalev (3rd)	(Estonia) Paide Linnameeskond (4th)	(Iceland) Valur (2nd)
First qualifying round		(Iceland) Stjarnan (3rd)	(Iceland) Breiðablik (4th)	(Albania) Partizani (2nd)	(Albania) Vllaznia (4th)
First qualifying round		(Albania) Tirana (5th)	(Wales) Connah's Quay Nomads (CW)	(Wales) Bala Town (3rd)	(Wales) Caernarfon Town (PW)
First qualifying round		(Gibraltar) St Joseph's (2nd)	(Gibraltar) FCB Magpies (3rd)	(North Macedonia) Tikvesh (CW)	(North Macedonia) Shkëndija (2nd)
First qualifying round		(Andorra) Inter Club d'Escaldes (2nd)	(Andorra) Atlètic Club d'Escaldes (3rd)	(Montenegro) Budućnost Podgorica (CW)	(Montenegro) Mornar (2nd)
First qualifying round		(San Marino) La Fiorita (CW)	(San Marino) Tre Penne (PW)		

Three teams not playing in a national top division took part in the competition: Corvinul Hunedoara (2nd tier), Vaduz (2nd tier) and Wisła Kraków (2nd tier).

Notes

1. Champions League (UCL Q1): Two of the Champions League first qualifying round losers were drawn to receive byes to the third qualifying round (Champions Path), as two fewer losers were transferred to the second qualifying round (Champions Path), due to Champions League league phase berths vacated following the Champions League title holders (Real Madrid) qualifying via league position and the suspension of Russia from the 2024–25 European season.
2. Albania (ALB): Skënderbeu, who finished third in the 2023–24 Kategoria Superiore, were banned from entering UEFA competitions. As a result, their berth in the competition was passed onto the fifth-placed team, Tirana.
3. Georgia (GEO): Georgian Cup winners FC Saburtalo Tbilisi changed their name to FC Iberia 1999 on 27 February 2024.
4. Greece (GRE): Olympiacos qualified for the 2024–25 UEFA Europa League league phase by winning the 2023–24 UEFA Europa Conference League, so their third place berth was vacated.
5. Latvia (LVA): Valmiera, who finished fourth in the 2023 Latvian Higher League, were denied a UEFA licence. As a result, their place in the competition was passed onto the fifth-placed team, Liepāja.
6. Liechtenstein (LIE): The seven teams affiliated with the Liechtenstein Football Association (LFV) all played in the Swiss football league system. The only competition organised by the LFV was the Liechtenstein Football Cup – the winners of which qualified for the UEFA Conference League for the 2024–25 season.
7. Lithuania (LTU): Due to the three-year rule, cup winners FK TransINVEST were not expected to compete as they were less than three years old. However, they were granted an exception and allowed to participate in European competitions.
8. Luxembourg (LUX): Swift Hesperange, who finished second, were denied a UEFA licence. Consequently, their place in the competition was passed onto the next highest-ranked team granted a UEFA licence by the FLF, UNA Strassen, who finished sixth.
9. Russia (RUS): On 28 February 2022, Russian football clubs and national teams were suspended from FIFA and UEFA competitions due to the Russian invasion of Ukraine. The tables reflect Russia's ongoing suspension from UEFA competitions.

== Schedule ==
The schedule of the competition was as follows. Matches were scheduled for Thursdays, with an exclusive day of 19 December, apart from the final, which took place on a Wednesday, though exceptionally could take place on Tuesdays or Wednesdays due to scheduling conflicts.

Schedule for 2024–25 UEFA Conference League
Phase	Round	Draw date	First leg	Second leg
Qualifying	First qualifying round	18 June 2024	11 July 2024	18 July 2024
Qualifying	Second qualifying round	19 June 2024	25 July 2024	1 August 2024
Qualifying	Third qualifying round	22 July 2024	8 August 2024	15 August 2024
Play-offs	Play-off round	5 August 2024	22 August 2024	29 August 2024
League phase	Matchday 1	30 August 2024	3 October 2024	
League phase	Matchday 2	30 August 2024	24 October 2024	
League phase	Matchday 3	30 August 2024	7 November 2024	
League phase	Matchday 4	30 August 2024	28 November 2024	
League phase	Matchday 5	30 August 2024	12 December 2024	
League phase	Matchday 6	30 August 2024	19 December 2024	
Knockout phase	Knockout phase play-offs	20 December 2024	13 February 2025	20 February 2025
Knockout phase	Round of 16	21 February 2025	6 March 2025	13 March 2025
Knockout phase	Quarter-finals	21 February 2025	10 April 2025	17 April 2025
Knockout phase	Semi-finals	21 February 2025	1 May 2025	8 May 2025
Knockout phase	Final	—N/a	28 May 2025 at Wrocław Stadium, Wrocław	

== Qualifying rounds ==
=== First qualifying round ===
The draw for the first qualifying round was held on 18 June 2024. The first legs were played on 10 and 11 July, and the second legs were played on 17 and 18 July 2024.

The winners of the ties advanced to the Main Path second qualifying round. The losers were eliminated from European competitions for the season.

First qualifying round
Team 1	Agg.	Team 2	1st leg	2nd leg
Velež Mostar (Bosnia and Herzegovina)	2–6	(Andorra) Inter Club d'Escaldes	1–1	1–5
Floriana (Malta)	4–2	(San Marino) Tre Penne	3–1	1–1
Torpedo-BelAZ Zhodino (Belarus)	2–4	(Moldova) Milsami Orhei	2–4	0–0
Šiauliai (Lithuania)	0–2	(Estonia) FCI Levadia	0–2	0–0
Bala Town (Wales)	2–3	(Estonia) Paide Linnameeskond	1–2	1–1 (a.e.t.)
La Fiorita (San Marino)	1–1 (4–2 p) (Note: Order of legs reversed after original draw.)	(Belarus) Isloch Minsk Raion	0–1	1–0 (a.e.t.)
Caernarfon Town (Wales)	3–3 (8–7 p)	(Northern Ireland) Crusaders	2–0	1–3 (a.e.t.)
Tallinna Kalev (Estonia)	1–4	(Armenia) Urartu	1–2	0–2
Valur (Iceland)	6–2	(Albania) Vllaznia	2–2	4–0
FCB Magpies (Gibraltar)	3–2	(Republic of Ireland) Derry City	2–0	1–2 (a.e.t.)
Malisheva (Kosovo)	1–3	(Montenegro) Budućnost Podgorica	1–0	0–3
Atlètic Club d'Escaldes (Andorra)	0–3	(Luxembourg) F91 Dudelange	0–1	0–2
Partizani (Albania)	3–2	(Malta) Marsaxlokk	1–1	2–1
Auda (Latvia)	3–0	(Faroe Islands) B36	2–0	1–0
Stjarnan (Iceland)	4–3	(Northern Ireland) Linfield	2–0	2–3
Torpedo Kutaisi (Georgia (country))	2–1	(Albania) Tirana	1–1	1–0
Shelbourne (Republic of Ireland)	3–2	(Gibraltar) St Joseph's	2–1	1–1
Aktobe (Kazakhstan)	3–3 (3–4 p)	(Bosnia and Herzegovina) Sarajevo	0–1	3–2 (a.e.t.)
Bravo (Slovenia)	2–1	(Wales) Connah's Quay Nomads	0–1	2–0 (a.e.t.)
Liepāja (Latvia)	1–3	(Faroe Islands) Víkingur Gøta	1–1	0–2
Noah (Armenia)	4–1	(North Macedonia) Shkëndija	2–0	2–1
Tikvesh (North Macedonia)	4–5	(Iceland) Breiðablik	3–2	1–3
Mornar (Montenegro)	3–2	(Georgia (country)) Dinamo Tbilisi	2–1	1–1
UNA Strassen (Luxembourg)	0–5	(Finland) KuPS	0–0	0–5
VPS (Finland)	1–3	(Lithuania) Žalgiris	1–2	0–1

=== Second qualifying round ===
The draw for the second qualifying round was held on 19 June 2024. The first legs were played on 23, 24 and 25 July, and the second legs were played on 30, 31 July and 1 August 2024.

The winners of the ties advanced to the third qualifying round of their respective path. The losers were eliminated from European competitions for the season.

Second qualifying round
Team 1	Agg.	Team 2	1st leg	2nd leg
Champions Path
HJK (Finland)	Bye	N/A	—	—
Larne (Northern Ireland)	Bye	N/A	—	—
Differdange 03 (Luxembourg)	4–4 (3–4 p)	(Kazakhstan) Ordabasy	1–0	3–4 (a.e.t.)
Víkingur Reykjavík (Iceland)	2–1	(Albania) Egnatia	0–1	2–0
Virtus (San Marino)	2–5	(Estonia) Flora	0–0	2–5 (a.e.t.)
Struga (North Macedonia)	3–4	(Armenia) Pyunik	2–1	1–3
Dinamo Batumi (Georgia (country))	0–2	(Montenegro) Dečić	0–2	0–0
Ballkani (Kosovo)	2–0	(Malta) Hamrun Spartans	0–0	2–0
Main Path
Go Ahead Eagles (Netherlands)	1–2	(Norway) Brann	0–0	1–2
Omonia (Cyprus)	5–2	(Georgia (country)) Torpedo Kutaisi	3–1	2–1
Breiðablik (Iceland)	1–3	(Kosovo) Drita	1–2	0–1
Osijek (Croatia)	6–1	(Estonia) FCI Levadia	5–1	1–0
Olimpija Ljubljana (Slovenia)	4–1	(Ukraine) Polissya Zhytomyr	2–0	2–1
AEK Athens (Greece)	8–3	(Andorra) Inter Club d'Escaldes	4–3	4–0
KuPS (Finland)	0–2	(Norway) Tromsø	0–1	0–1
Valur (Iceland)	1–4	(Scotland) St Mirren	0–0	1–4
Sumgayit (Azerbaijan)	1–2	(Hungary) Fehérvár	1–2	0–0
Ilves (Finland)	5–5 (5–4 p)	Austria Wien	2–1	3–4 (a.e.t.)
CSKA 1948 (Bulgaria)	2–1	(Montenegro) Budućnost Podgorica	1–0	1–1 (a.e.t.)
Zira (Azerbaijan)	6–1	(Slovakia) DAC Dunajská Streda	4–0	2–1
Maribor (Slovenia)	4–3	(Romania) Universitatea Craiova	2–0	2–3
St Patrick's Athletic (Republic of Ireland)	5–3	(Liechtenstein) Vaduz	3–1	2–2
FCB Magpies (Gibraltar)	1–8 (Note: Order of legs reversed after original draw.)	(Denmark) Copenhagen	0–3	1–5
İstanbul Başakşehir (Turkey)	10–1	(San Marino) La Fiorita	6–1	4–0
Legia Warsaw (Poland)	11–0	(Wales) Caernarfon Town	6–0	5–0
Dnipro-1 (Ukraine)	0–6	(Hungary) Puskás Akadémia	0–3 (Note: Dnipro-1 forfeited its two matches due to bankruptcy.)	0–3
Žalgiris (Lithuania)	2–4	(Cyprus) Pafos	2–1	0–3 (a.e.t.)
Djurgårdens IF (Sweden)	3–1	(Luxembourg) Progrès Niederkorn	3–0	0–1
Gent (Belgium)	7–1	(Faroe Islands) Víkingur Gøta	4–1	3–0
F91 Dudelange (Luxembourg)	3–12	(Sweden) BK Häcken	2–6	1–6
Hapoel Be'er Sheva (Israel)	2–1	(Bulgaria) Cherno More	0–0	2–1
Hajduk Split (Croatia)	2–0	(Faroe Islands) HB	2–0	0–0
Zrinjski Mostar (Bosnia and Herzegovina)	3–2	(Slovenia) Bravo	0–1	3–1
Riga (Latvia)	2–3	(Poland) Śląsk Wrocław	1–0	1–3
Floriana (Malta)	0–5	(Portugal) Vitória de Guimarães	0–1	0–4
Stjarnan (Iceland)	2–5	(Estonia) Paide Linnameeskond	2–1	0–4
Cliftonville (Northern Ireland)	1–4	(Latvia) Auda	1–2	0–2
St. Gallen (Switzerland)	5–1	(Kazakhstan) Tobol	4–1	1–0
Mladá Boleslav (Czech Republic)	3–0	(Lithuania) TransINVEST	2–0	1–0
Noah (Armenia)	7–0	(Malta) Sliema Wanderers	7–0	0–0
Baník Ostrava (Czech Republic)	7–1	(Armenia) Urartu	5–1	2–0
Zürich (Switzerland)	3–0	(Republic of Ireland) Shelbourne	3–0	0–0
Brøndby (Denmark)	8–2	(Kosovo) Llapi	6–0	2–2
CFR Cluj (Romania)	5–0	(Belarus) Neman Grodno	0–0	5–0
Zimbru Chișinău (Moldova)	1–6	Ararat-Armenia	0–3	1–3
Radnički 1923 (Serbia)	2–2 (3–4 p)	(Montenegro) Mornar	1–0	1–2 (a.e.t.)
Sarajevo (Bosnia and Herzegovina)	0–3	(Slovakia) Spartak Trnava	0–0	0–3
Maccabi Haifa (Israel)	6–6 (2–3 p)	(Azerbaijan) Sabah	0–3	6–3 (a.e.t.)
Paks (Hungary)	5–0	(Cyprus) AEK Larnaca	3–0	2–0
Iberia 1999 (Georgia (country))	2–0	(Albania) Partizani	2–0	0–0
Milsami Orhei (Moldova)	1–2	(Kazakhstan) Astana	1–1	0–1

=== Third qualifying round ===
The draw for the third qualifying round was held on 22 July 2024. The first legs were played on 6, 7 and 8 August, and the second legs were played on 13, 14 and 15 August 2024.

The winners of the ties advanced to the play-off round of their respective path. The losers were eliminated from European competitions for the season.

Third qualifying round
Team 1	Agg.	Team 2	1st leg	2nd leg
Champions Path
Víkingur Reykjavík (Iceland)	3–2	(Estonia) Flora	1–1	2–1
Ordabasy (Kazakhstan)	0–2	(Armenia) Pyunik	0–1	0–1
Ballkani (Kosovo)	1–1 (1–4 p)	(Northern Ireland) Larne	0–1	1–0 (a.e.t.)
HJK (Finland)	2–2 (4–3 p)	(Montenegro) Dečić	1–0	1–2 (a.e.t.)
Main Path
Mladá Boleslav (Czech Republic)	5–3	(Israel) Hapoel Be'er Sheva	1–1	4–2
Kilmarnock (Scotland)	3–2	(Norway) Tromsø	2–2	1–0
Ararat-Armenia	3–4	(Hungary) Puskás Akadémia	0–1	3–3
Zürich (Switzerland)	0–5	(Portugal) Vitória de Guimarães	0–3	0–2
Paks (Hungary)	5–2	(Montenegro) Mornar	3–0	2–2
BK Häcken (Sweden)	7–2	(Estonia) Paide Linnameeskond	6–1	1–1
Maribor (Slovenia)	2–2 (4–2 p)	(Serbia) Vojvodina	2–1	0–1 (a.e.t.)
Spartak Trnava (Slovakia)	4–4 (11–12 p)	(Poland) Wisła Kraków	3–1	1–3 (a.e.t.)
St Patrick's Athletic (Republic of Ireland)	2–0	(Azerbaijan) Sabah	1–0	1–0
St Mirren (Scotland)	2–4	(Norway) Brann	1–1	1–3
CSKA 1948 (Bulgaria)	2–5	(Cyprus) Pafos	2–1	0–4 (a.e.t.)
Ilves (Finland)	2–4	(Sweden) Djurgårdens IF	1–1	1–3
Corvinul Hunedoara (Romania)	2–8	(Kazakhstan) Astana	1–2	1–6
Ružomberok (Slovakia)	1–0	(Croatia) Hajduk Split	0–0	1–0
Noah (Armenia)	3–2	(Greece) AEK Athens	3–1	0–1
Auda (Latvia)	2–3	(Kosovo) Drita	1–0	1–3 (a.e.t.)
Iberia 1999 (Georgia (country))	0–3	(Turkey) İstanbul Başakşehir	0–1	0–2
Brøndby (Denmark)	3–4	(Poland) Legia Warsaw	2–3	1–1
Maccabi Petah Tikva (Israel)	0–2	(Romania) CFR Cluj	0–1	0–1
Silkeborg (Denmark)	4–5	(Belgium) Gent	2–2	2–3 (a.e.t.)
Osijek (Croatia)	3–3 (1–2 p)	(Azerbaijan) Zira	1–1	2–2 (a.e.t.)
St. Gallen (Switzerland)	4–3	(Poland) Śląsk Wrocław	2–0	2–3
Botev Plovdiv (Bulgaria)	2–3	(Bosnia and Herzegovina) Zrinjski Mostar	2–1	0–2
Omonia (Cyprus)	3–0	(Hungary) Fehérvár	1–0	2–0
Copenhagen (Denmark)	1–1 (2–1 p)	(Czech Republic) Baník Ostrava	1–0	0–1 (a.e.t.)
Olimpija Ljubljana (Slovenia)	4–0	(Moldova) Sheriff Tiraspol	3–0	1–0

== Play-off round ==
The draw for the play-off round was held on 5 August 2024. The first legs were played on 20, 21 and 22 August, and the second legs were played on 28 and 29 August 2024.

The winners of the ties advanced to the league phase. The losers were eliminated from European competitions for the season.

Play-off round
Team 1	Agg.	Team 2	1st leg	2nd leg
Champions Path
Lincoln Red Imps (Gibraltar)	3–4	(Northern Ireland) Larne	2–1	1–3
Pyunik (Armenia)	2–4	(Slovenia) Celje	1–0	1–4
Víkingur Reykjavík (Iceland)	5–0	(Andorra) UE Santa Coloma	5–0	0–0
Panevėžys (Lithuania)	0–3	(Wales) The New Saints	0–3	0–0
KÍ (Faroe Islands)	3–4	(Finland) HJK	2–2	1–2
Main Path
Omonia (Cyprus)	6–1	(Azerbaijan) Zira	6–0	0–1
St. Gallen (Switzerland)	1–1 (5–4 p)	(Turkey) Trabzonspor	0–0	1–1 (a.e.t.)
Lens (France)	2–3	(Greece) Panathinaikos	2–1	0–2
BK Häcken (Sweden)	3–5	(Germany) 1. FC Heidenheim	1–2	2–3
Copenhagen (Denmark)	3–1	(Scotland) Kilmarnock	2–0	1–1
Vitória de Guimarães (Portugal)	7–0	(Bosnia and Herzegovina) Zrinjski Mostar	3–0	4–0
Brann (Norway)	2–3	(Kazakhstan) Astana	2–0	0–3
Legia Warsaw (Poland)	3–0	(Kosovo) Drita	2–0	1–0
Rijeka (Croatia)	1–6	(Slovenia) Olimpija Ljubljana	1–1	0–5
Fiorentina (Italy)	4–4 (5–4 p)	(Hungary) Puskás Akadémia	3–3	1–1 (a.e.t.)
Djurgårdens IF (Sweden)	2–0	(Slovenia) Maribor	1–0	1–0
Wisła Kraków (Poland)	5–7	(Belgium) Cercle Brugge	1–6	4–1
Mladá Boleslav (Czech Republic)	5–2	(Hungary) Paks	2–2	3–0
St Patrick's Athletic (Republic of Ireland)	0–2	(Turkey) İstanbul Başakşehir	0–0	0–2
Chelsea (England)	3–2	(Switzerland) Servette	2–0	1–2
CFR Cluj (Romania)	1–3	(Cyprus) Pafos	1–0	0–3
Partizan (Serbia)	0–2	(Belgium) Gent	0–1	0–1
Kryvbas Kryvyi Rih (Ukraine)	0–5	(Spain) Real Betis	0–2	0–3
Noah (Armenia)	4–3	(Slovakia) Ružomberok	3–0	1–3

== League phase ==
Location of teams of the 2024–25 UEFA Conference League league phase

The league phase draw for the 2024–25 UEFA Conference League took place at the Grimaldi Forum in Monaco on 30 August 2024, 14:30 CEST. The 36 teams were divided into six pots of six teams each based on their UEFA club coefficient.

The 36 teams were manually drawn and then automated software digitally drew their six different opponents at random, determining which of their matches were at home and which ones away. Each team faced one opponent from each of the six pots. Teams could not face opponents from their own association, and could only be drawn against a maximum of two sides from the same association.

Borac Banja Luka, Celje, Cercle Brugge, 1. FC Heidenheim, Jagiellonia Białystok, Larne, Noah, Pafos, Petrocub Hîncești, The New Saints, and Víkingur Reykjavík all made their debut appearances in a major UEFA competition group or league phase. In addition, Noah were the first club in Conference League history to successfully navigate all four rounds of qualification, while The New Saints and Larne were the first teams from the Wales and Northern Ireland associations, respectively, to play in a major UEFA competition group or league stage. (Note: Swansea City, a Wales-based club playing in the English football league system, had previously qualified via one of England's berths. The New Saints are in fact an England-based club but play in the Welsh football league system and qualified via one of Wales' berths.)

A total of 29 national associations were represented in the league phase.

=== Table ===
The top eight ranked teams received a bye to the round of 16. Teams ranked from 9th to 24th contested the knockout phase play-offs, with the teams ranked from 9th to 16th seeded for the draw, while those ranked 17th to 24th were not. Teams ranked from 25th to 36th were eliminated from the competition.

Pos	Team	Pld	W	D	L	GF	GA	GD	Pts	Qualification
1	(The Football Association) Chelsea	6	6	0	0	26	5	+21	18	Advance to round of 16 (seeded)
2	(Portuguese Football Federation) Vitória de Guimarães	6	4	2	0	13	6	+7	14	Advance to round of 16 (seeded)
3	(Italian Football Federation) Fiorentina	6	4	1	1	18	7	+11	13	Advance to round of 16 (seeded)
4	(Austrian Football Association) Rapid Wien	6	4	1	1	11	5	+6	13	Advance to round of 16 (seeded)
5	(Swedish Football Association) Djurgårdens IF	6	4	1	1	11	7	+4	13 (Note: Away goals scored: Djurgårdens IF 5, Lugano 4.)	Advance to round of 16 (seeded)
6	(Swiss Football Association) Lugano	6	4	1	1	11	7	+4	13	Advance to round of 16 (seeded)
7	(Polish Football Association) Legia Warsaw	6	4	0	2	13	5	+8	12	Advance to round of 16 (seeded)
8	(Royal Belgian Football Association) Cercle Brugge	6	3	2	1	14	7	+7	11	Advance to round of 16 (seeded)
9	(Polish Football Association) Jagiellonia Białystok	6	3	2	1	10	5	+5	11	Advance to knockout phase play-offs (seeded)
10	(Football Association of Ireland) Shamrock Rovers	6	3	2	1	12	9	+3	11	Advance to knockout phase play-offs (seeded)
11	(Cyprus Football Association) APOEL	6	3	2	1	8	5	+3	11	Advance to knockout phase play-offs (seeded)
12	(Cyprus Football Association) Pafos	6	3	1	2	11	7	+4	10	Advance to knockout phase play-offs (seeded)
13	(Hellenic Football Federation) Panathinaikos	6	3	1	2	10	7	+3	10	Advance to knockout phase play-offs (seeded)
14	(Football Association of Slovenia) Olimpija Ljubljana	6	3	1	2	7	6	+1	10	Advance to knockout phase play-offs (seeded)
15	(Royal Spanish Football Federation) Real Betis	6	3	1	2	6	5	+1	10	Advance to knockout phase play-offs (seeded)
16	(German Football Association) 1. FC Heidenheim	6	3	1	2	7	7	0	10	Advance to knockout phase play-offs (seeded)
17	(Royal Belgian Football Association) Gent	6	3	0	3	8	8	0	9	Advance to knockout phase play-offs (unseeded)
18	(Danish Football Association) Copenhagen	6	2	2	2	8	9	−1	8	Advance to knockout phase play-offs (unseeded)
19	(Football Association of Iceland) Víkingur Reykjavík	6	2	2	2	7	8	−1	8	Advance to knockout phase play-offs (unseeded)
20	(Football Association of Bosnia and Herzegovina) Borac Banja Luka	6	2	2	2	4	7	−3	8	Advance to knockout phase play-offs (unseeded)
21	(Football Association of Slovenia) Celje	6	2	1	3	13	13	0	7	Advance to knockout phase play-offs (unseeded)
22	(Cyprus Football Association) Omonia	6	2	1	3	7	7	0	7	Advance to knockout phase play-offs (unseeded)
23	(Norwegian Football Federation) Molde	6	2	1	3	10	11	−1	7	Advance to knockout phase play-offs (unseeded)
24	(Football Association of Serbia) TSC	6	2	1	3	10	13	−3	7	Advance to knockout phase play-offs (unseeded)
25	(Scottish Football Association) Heart of Midlothian	6	2	1	3	6	9	−3	7	
26	(Turkish Football Federation) İstanbul Başakşehir	6	1	3	2	9	12	−3	6	
27	(Football Association of the Czech Republic) Mladá Boleslav	6	2	0	4	7	10	−3	6	
28	(Kazakhstan Football Federation) Astana	6	1	2	3	4	8	−4	5	
29	(Swiss Football Association) St. Gallen	6	1	2	3	10	18	−8	5	
30	(Football Association of Finland) HJK	6	1	1	4	3	9	−6	4	
31	(Football Federation of Armenia) Noah	6	1	1	4	6	16	−10	4	
32	(Football Association of Wales) The New Saints	6	1	0	5	5	10	−5	3	
33	(Football Federation of Belarus) Dinamo Minsk	6	1	0	5	4	13	−9	3	
34	(Irish Football Association) Larne	6	1	0	5	3	12	−9	3	
35	(Austrian Football Association) LASK	6	0	3	3	4	14	−10	3	
36	(Moldovan Football Federation) Petrocub Hîncești	6	0	2	4	4	13	−9	2	

Source: UEFA
Rules for classification: League phase tiebreakers

=== Results ===
Matchday 1
Home team	Score	Away team
İstanbul Başakşehir (Turkey)	1–2	(Austria) Rapid Wien
Vitória de Guimarães (Portugal)	3–1	(Slovenia) Celje
1. FC Heidenheim (Germany)	2–1	(Slovenia) Olimpija Ljubljana
Cercle Brugge (Belgium)	6–2	(Switzerland) St. Gallen
Astana (Kazakhstan)	1–0	(Serbia) TSC
Dinamo Minsk (Belarus)	1–2	(Scotland) Heart of Midlothian
Noah (Armenia)	2–0	(Czech Republic) Mladá Boleslav
Legia Warsaw (Poland)	1–0	(Spain) Real Betis
Molde (Norway)	3–0	(Northern Ireland) Larne
Omonia (Cyprus)	4–0	(Iceland) Víkingur Reykjavík
Fiorentina (Italy)	2–0	(Wales) The New Saints
Chelsea (England)	4–2	(Belgium) Gent
Copenhagen (Denmark)	1–2	(Poland) Jagiellonia Białystok
Lugano (Switzerland)	3–0	(Finland) HJK
Petrocub Hîncești (Moldova)	1–4	(Cyprus) Pafos
Borac Banja Luka (Bosnia and Herzegovina)	1–1	(Greece) Panathinaikos
LASK (Austria)	2–2	(Sweden) Djurgårdens IF
Shamrock Rovers (Republic of Ireland)	1–1	(Cyprus) APOEL

Matchday 2
Home team	Score	Away team
Víkingur Reykjavík (Iceland)	3–1	(Belgium) Cercle Brugge
APOEL (Cyprus)	0–1	(Bosnia and Herzegovina) Borac Banja Luka
Djurgårdens IF (Sweden)	1–2	(Portugal) Vitória de Guimarães
St. Gallen (Switzerland)	2–4	(Italy) Fiorentina
Heart of Midlothian (Scotland)	2–0	(Cyprus) Omonia
Jagiellonia Białystok (Poland)	2–0	(Moldova) Petrocub Hîncești
Gent (Belgium)	2–1	(Norway) Molde
Larne (Northern Ireland)	1–4	(Republic of Ireland) Shamrock Rovers
Celje (Slovenia)	5–1	(Turkey) İstanbul Başakşehir
Panathinaikos (Greece)	1–4	(England) Chelsea
Rapid Wien (Austria)	1–0	(Armenia) Noah
Mladá Boleslav (Czech Republic)	0–1	(Switzerland) Lugano
TSC (Serbia)	0–3	(Poland) Legia Warsaw
HJK (Finland)	1–0	(Belarus) Dinamo Minsk
Olimpija Ljubljana (Slovenia)	2–0	(Austria) LASK
Pafos (Cyprus)	0–1	(Germany) 1. FC Heidenheim
Real Betis (Spain)	1–1	(Denmark) Copenhagen
The New Saints (Wales)	2–0	(Kazakhstan) Astana

Matchday 3
Home team	Score	Away team
Víkingur Reykjavík (Iceland)	2–0	(Bosnia and Herzegovina) Borac Banja Luka
Petrocub Hîncești (Moldova)	0–3	(Austria) Rapid Wien
TSC (Serbia)	4–1	(Switzerland) Lugano
HJK (Finland)	0–2	(Slovenia) Olimpija Ljubljana
Gent (Belgium)	1–0	(Cyprus) Omonia
Legia Warsaw (Poland)	4–0	(Belarus) Dinamo Minsk
Pafos (Cyprus)	1–0	(Kazakhstan) Astana
Shamrock Rovers (Republic of Ireland)	2–1	(Wales) The New Saints
APOEL (Cyprus)	2–1	(Italy) Fiorentina
Chelsea (England)	8–0	(Armenia) Noah
Djurgårdens IF (Sweden)	2–1	(Greece) Panathinaikos
Copenhagen (Denmark)	2–2	(Turkey) İstanbul Başakşehir
Heart of Midlothian (Scotland)	0–2	(Germany) 1. FC Heidenheim
Jagiellonia Białystok (Poland)	3–0	(Norway) Molde
Larne (Northern Ireland)	1–2	(Switzerland) St. Gallen
LASK (Austria)	0–0	(Belgium) Cercle Brugge
Real Betis (Spain)	2–1	(Slovenia) Celje
Vitória de Guimarães (Portugal)	2–1	(Czech Republic) Mladá Boleslav

Matchday 4
Home team	Score	Away team
İstanbul Başakşehir (Turkey)	1–1	(Moldova) Petrocub Hîncești
Astana (Kazakhstan)	1–1	(Portugal) Vitória de Guimarães
1. FC Heidenheim (Germany)	0–2	(England) Chelsea
Cercle Brugge (Belgium)	2–0	(Scotland) Heart of Midlothian
Dinamo Minsk (Belarus)	1–2	(Denmark) Copenhagen
Noah (Armenia)	0–0	(Iceland) Víkingur Reykjavík
St. Gallen (Switzerland)	2–2	(Serbia) TSC
Borac Banja Luka (Bosnia and Herzegovina)	2–1	(Austria) LASK
Molde (Norway)	0–1	(Cyprus) APOEL
Celje (Slovenia)	3–3	(Poland) Jagiellonia Białystok
Panathinaikos (Greece)	1–0	(Finland) HJK
The New Saints (Wales)	0–1	(Sweden) Djurgårdens IF
Fiorentina (Italy)	3–2	(Cyprus) Pafos
Lugano (Switzerland)	2–0	(Belgium) Gent
Mladá Boleslav (Czech Republic)	2–1	(Spain) Real Betis
Olimpija Ljubljana (Slovenia)	1–0	(Northern Ireland) Larne
Omonia (Cyprus)	0–3	(Poland) Legia Warsaw
Rapid Wien (Austria)	1–1	(Republic of Ireland) Shamrock Rovers

Matchday 5
Home team	Score	Away team
Víkingur Reykjavík (Iceland)	1–2	(Sweden) Djurgårdens IF
Astana (Kazakhstan)	1–3	(England) Chelsea
Fiorentina (Italy)	7–0	(Austria) LASK
Copenhagen (Denmark)	2–0	(Scotland) Heart of Midlothian
Dinamo Minsk (Belarus)	2–0	(Northern Ireland) Larne
Noah (Armenia)	1–3	(Cyprus) APOEL
Petrocub Hîncești (Moldova)	0–1	(Spain) Real Betis
HJK (Finland)	2–2	(Norway) Molde
İstanbul Başakşehir (Turkey)	3–1	(Germany) 1. FC Heidenheim
Legia Warsaw (Poland)	1–2	(Switzerland) Lugano
Olimpija Ljubljana (Slovenia)	1–4	(Belgium) Cercle Brugge
St. Gallen (Switzerland)	1–4	(Portugal) Vitória de Guimarães
Mladá Boleslav (Czech Republic)	1–0	(Poland) Jagiellonia Białystok
Gent (Belgium)	3–0	(Serbia) TSC
Omonia (Cyprus)	3–1	(Austria) Rapid Wien
Pafos (Cyprus)	2–0	(Slovenia) Celje
Shamrock Rovers (Republic of Ireland)	3–0	(Bosnia and Herzegovina) Borac Banja Luka
The New Saints (Wales)	0–2	(Greece) Panathinaikos

Matchday 6
Home team	Score	Away team
1. FC Heidenheim (Germany)	1–1	(Switzerland) St. Gallen
APOEL (Cyprus)	1–1	(Kazakhstan) Astana
Cercle Brugge (Belgium)	1–1	(Turkey) İstanbul Başakşehir
Chelsea (England)	5–1	(Republic of Ireland) Shamrock Rovers
Djurgårdens IF (Sweden)	3–1	(Poland) Legia Warsaw
Lugano (Switzerland)	2–2	(Cyprus) Pafos
Borac Banja Luka (Bosnia and Herzegovina)	0–0	(Cyprus) Omonia
TSC (Serbia)	4–3	(Armenia) Noah
Heart of Midlothian (Scotland)	2–2	(Moldova) Petrocub Hîncești
Jagiellonia Białystok (Poland)	0–0	(Slovenia) Olimpija Ljubljana
Larne (Northern Ireland)	1–0	(Belgium) Gent
LASK (Austria)	1–1	(Iceland) Víkingur Reykjavík
Molde (Norway)	4–3	(Czech Republic) Mladá Boleslav
Celje (Slovenia)	3–2	(Wales) The New Saints
Panathinaikos (Greece)	4–0	(Belarus) Dinamo Minsk
Real Betis (Spain)	1–0	(Finland) HJK
Rapid Wien (Austria)	3–0	(Denmark) Copenhagen
Vitória de Guimarães (Portugal)	1–1	(Italy) Fiorentina

== Knockout phase ==
In the knockout phase, teams played against each other over two legs on a home-and-away basis, except for the one-match final. The bracket structure for the knockout phase was partially fixed in advance using seeding, with teams' positions in the bracket determined by the final standings in the league phase. In the knockout phase, there is no country protection, with teams from the same association able to face each other in any round. Teams can also face opponents they played during the league phase.

The mechanism of the draws for each round was as follows:

- In the draw for the knockout phase play-offs, the eight teams finishing the league phase in positions 9–16 were seeded, and the eight teams finishing the league phase in positions 17–24 were unseeded. The draw was split into four sections based on the predetermined bracket, with the seeded teams in each section drawn against one of their two possible unseeded opponents. The seeded teams hosted the second leg.
- In the draw for the round of 16, the eight teams finishing the league phase in positions 1–8 were seeded, and the eight winners of the knockout phase play-offs were unseeded. Again, the draw was split into four sections based on the predetermined bracket, with the seeded teams in each section drawn against one of their two possible unseeded opponents. The seeded teams hosted the second leg.
- In the quarter-finals and semi-finals, the exact match pairings were predetermined based on the tournament bracket. A draw was conducted only to determine which team played the first leg at home. The winner of semi-final 1 will be designated as the "home" team for the final (for administrative purposes as it is played at a neutral venue).

=== Bracket ===
Knockout phase play-offs
17	(Belgium) Gent	0	1	1
15	(Spain) Real Betis	3	0	3
24	(Serbia) TSC	1	1	2
9	(Poland) Jagiellonia Białystok	3	3	6
21	(Slovenia) Celje	2	2	4
11	(Cyprus) APOEL	2	0	2
19	(Iceland) Víkingur Reykjavík	2	0	2
13	(Greece) Panathinaikos	1	2	3
22	(Cyprus) Omonia	1	1	2
12	(Cyprus) Pafos	1	2	3
20	(Bosnia and Herzegovina) Borac Banja Luka	1	0	1
14	(Slovenia) Olimpija Ljubljana	0	0	0
23	(Norway) Molde (p)	0	1	1 (5)
10	(Republic of Ireland) Shamrock Rovers	1	0	1 (4)
18	(Denmark) Copenhagen (a.e.t.)	1	3	4
16	(Germany) 1. FC Heidenheim	2	1	3

Round of 16
15	(Spain) Real Betis	2	4	6
2	(Portugal) Vitória de Guimarães	2	0	2
9	(Poland) Jagiellonia Białystok	3	0	3
8	(Belgium) Cercle Brugge	0	2	2
21	(Slovenia) Celje (p)	1	4	5 (3)
6	(Switzerland) Lugano	0	5	5 (1)
13	(Greece) Panathinaikos	3	1	4
3	(Italy) Fiorentina	2	3	5
12	(Cyprus) Pafos	1	0	1
5	(Sweden) Djurgårdens IF	0	3	3
20	(Bosnia and Herzegovina) Borac Banja Luka	1	1	2
4	(Austria) Rapid Wien (a.e.t.)	1	2	3
23	(Norway) Molde	3	0	3
7	(Poland) Legia Warsaw (a.e.t.)	2	2	4
18	(Denmark) Copenhagen	1	0	1
1	(England) Chelsea	2	1	3

Quarter-finals
15	(Spain) Real Betis	2	1	3
9	(Poland) Jagiellonia Białystok	0	1	1
21	(Slovenia) Celje	1	2	3
3	(Italy) Fiorentina	2	2	4
5	(Sweden) Djurgårdens IF (a.e.t.)	0	4	4
4	(Austria) Rapid Wien	1	1	2
7	(Poland) Legia Warsaw	0	2	2
1	(England) Chelsea	3	1	4

Semi-finals
15	(Spain) Real Betis (a.e.t.)	2	2	4
3	(Italy) Fiorentina	1	2	3
5	(Sweden) Djurgårdens IF	1	0	1
1	(England) Chelsea	4	1	5

Final
28 May – Wrocław
15	(Spain) Real Betis	1
1	(England) Chelsea	4

=== Knockout phase play-offs ===
The draw for the knockout phase play-offs was held on 20 December 2024, 13:00 CET. The first legs were played on 13 February, and the second legs were played on 20 February 2025.

Team 1	Agg.	Team 2	1st leg	2nd leg
Gent (Belgium)	1–3	(Spain) Real Betis	0–3	1–0
TSC (Serbia)	2–6	(Poland) Jagiellonia Białystok	1–3	1–3
Celje (Slovenia)	4–2	(Cyprus) APOEL	2–2	2–0
Víkingur Reykjavík (Iceland)	2–3	(Greece) Panathinaikos	2–1	0–2
Copenhagen (Denmark)	4–3	(Germany) 1. FC Heidenheim	1–2	3–1 (a.e.t.)
Molde (Norway)	1–1 (5–4 p)	(Republic of Ireland) Shamrock Rovers	0–1	1–0 (a.e.t.)
Omonia (Cyprus)	2–3	(Cyprus) Pafos	1–1	1–2
Borac Banja Luka (Bosnia and Herzegovina)	1–0	(Slovenia) Olimpija Ljubljana	1–0	0–0

=== Round of 16 ===
The draw for the round of 16 was held on 21 February 2025, 14:00 CET. The first legs were played on 6 March, and the second legs were played on 13 March 2025.

Team 1	Agg.	Team 2	1st leg	2nd leg
Real Betis (Spain)	6–2	(Portugal) Vitória de Guimarães	2–2	4–0
Jagiellonia Białystok (Poland)	3–2	(Belgium) Cercle Brugge	3–0	0–2
Celje (Slovenia)	5–5 (3–1 p)	(Switzerland) Lugano	1–0	4–5 (a.e.t.)
Panathinaikos (Greece)	4–5	(Italy) Fiorentina	3–2	1–3
Copenhagen (Denmark)	1–3	(England) Chelsea	1–2	0–1
Molde (Norway)	3–4	(Poland) Legia Warsaw	3–2	0–2 (a.e.t.)
Pafos (Cyprus)	1–3	(Sweden) Djurgårdens IF	1–0	0–3
Borac Banja Luka (Bosnia and Herzegovina)	2–3	(Austria) Rapid Wien	1–1	1–2 (a.e.t.)

=== Quarter-finals ===
The draw for the order of the quarter-final legs was held on 21 February 2025, 14:00 CET, after the round of 16 draw. The first legs were played on 10 April, and the second legs were played on 17 April 2025.

Team 1	Agg.	Team 2	1st leg	2nd leg
Real Betis (Spain)	3–1	(Poland) Jagiellonia Białystok	2–0	1–1
Celje (Slovenia)	3–4	(Italy) Fiorentina	1–2	2–2
Legia Warsaw (Poland)	2–4 (Note: Order of legs reversed in order to avoid a scheduling conflict with the Europa League's Tottenham Hotspur v Eintracht Frankfurt match in the same city.)	(England) Chelsea	0–3	2–1
Djurgårdens IF (Sweden)	4–2	(Austria) Rapid Wien	0–1	4–1 (a.e.t.)

=== Semi-finals ===
The draw for the order of the semi-final legs was held on 21 February 2025, 14:00 CET, after the round of 16 and quarter-final draws. The first legs were played on 1 May, and the second legs were played on 8 May 2025.

Team 1	Agg.	Team 2	1st leg	2nd leg
Real Betis (Spain)	4–3	(Italy) Fiorentina	2–1	2–2 (a.e.t.)
Djurgårdens IF (Sweden)	1–5 (Note: Order of legs reversed in order to avoid a scheduling conflict with the Europa League's Tottenham Hotspur v Bodø/Glimt match in the same city.)	(England) Chelsea	1–4	0–1

=== Final ===
The final was played on 28 May 2025 at the Wrocław Stadium in Wrocław. The winner of semi-final 1 was designated as the "home" team for administrative purposes.

28 May 2025
21:00 UTC+2

Real Betis (Royal Spanish Football Federation)	1–4	(The Football Association) Chelsea
Ezzalzouli 9'	Report	Fernández 65'; Jackson 70'; Sancho 83'; Caicedo 90+1'

Wrocław Stadium, Wrocław
Attendance: 39,754
Referee: Irfan Peljto (Bosnia and Herzegovina)

== Statistics ==
Statistics exclude qualifying rounds and play-off round.

=== Top goalscorers ===
Rank	Player	Team	Goals	Minutes played
1	(Democratic Republic of the Congo) Afimico Pululu	(Poland) Jagiellonia Białystok	8	1005
2	(Democratic Republic of the Congo) Cédric Bakambu	(Spain) Real Betis	7	1015
3	(Spain) Marc Guiu	(England) Chelsea	6	287
3	(Lithuania) Armandas Kučys	(Slovenia) Celje	6	570
5	(Poland) Krzysztof Piątek	(Turkey) İstanbul Başakşehir	5	465
5	(Republic of Ireland) Johnny Kenny	(Republic of Ireland) Shamrock Rovers	5	475
5	(Serbia) Miloš Pantović	(Serbia) TSC	5	520
5	(France) Christopher Nkunku	(England) Chelsea	5	635
5	(Croatia) Dion Beljo	(Austria) Rapid Wien	5	847
5	(Italy) Rolando Mandragora	(Italy) Fiorentina	5	962

=== Team of the Season ===
The UEFA technical study group selected the following players as the team of the tournament.

Pos.	Player	Team
GK	(Denmark) Filip Jörgensen	(England) Chelsea
DF	(Senegal) Youssouf Sabaly	(Spain) Real Betis
DF	(England) Tosin Adarabioyo	(England) Chelsea
DF	(Brazil) Natan	(Spain) Real Betis
DF	(Germany) Robin Gosens	(Italy) Fiorentina
MF	(Slovenia) Svit Sešlar	(Slovenia) Celje
MF	(Spain) Isco	(Spain) Real Betis
MF	(Argentina) Enzo Fernández	(England) Chelsea
FW	(England) Cole Palmer	(England) Chelsea
FW	(Democratic Republic of the Congo) Afimico Pululu	(Poland) Jagiellonia Białystok
FW	(Norway) Tokmac Nguen	(Sweden) Djurgårdens IF

=== Player of the Season ===
- (Spain) Isco ( (Spain) Real Betis)

=== Young Player of the Season ===
- (Norway) Tobias Gulliksen ( (Sweden) Djurgårdens IF)

== See also ==
- 2024–25 UEFA Champions League
- 2024–25 UEFA Europa League
- 2025 UEFA Super Cup
- 2024–25 UEFA Women's Champions League
- 2024–25 UEFA Youth League
