= 2023–24 Football Superleague of Kosovo =

Football Superleague of Kosovo
- Season: 2023–24
- Dates: 12 August 2023 – 25 May 2024
- Champions: Ballkani
- Relegated: Fushë Kosova; Liria Prizren
- Champions League: Ballkani
- Europa League: Llapi
- Conference League: Drita; Malisheva
- Matches: 180
- Goals: 432 (2.4 per match)
- Top goalscorer: Muhamet Hyseni (26 goals)
- Biggest home win: Malisheva 7–4 Liria Prizren (18 May 2024)
- Biggest away win: Liria Prizren 3–5 Feronikeli 74 (24 September 2023)
- Highest scoring: Malisheva 7–4 Liria Prizren (18 May 2024)
- All statistics correct as of 25 May 2024.

The 2023–24 Football Superleague of Kosovo season, also known as the ALBI MALL Superleague of Kosovo (Albanian: ALBI MALL Superliga e Kosovës) for sponsorship reasons with Albi Mall was the 25th (Note: This season is the 25th season under the name Football Superleague of Kosovo, the 31st season of top-tier football in Kosovo and the 77th season of football in Kosovo overall.) season of top-tier football in Kosovo. The season began on 12 August 2023 and ended on 25 May 2024.

== Teams ==
The leаgue consisted of ten teams – the top seven teаms from the previous season and three teams promoted from the 2022–23 Kosovo First League. Ballkani entered the season as the defending champions.

The two directly promoted teаms were Feronikeli and Fushë Kosova, winners of the 2022–23 Kosovo First League groups A and B, respectively. They replaced the 2022–23 Kosovo Superleague bottom two teams, Drenica and Trepça '89. The First League Group A runners-up, Liria Prizren, won the Kosovo Superleague play-off to also earn promotion, defeating eighth-placed Superleague team Ferizaj to take their place in the league.

=== Stаdiums and locаtions ===
Locations of the 2023–24 Football Superleague of Kosovo teams

Note: Table lists in alphabetical order.

| Club | Town | Stadium and capacity | | UEFA license |
|---|---|---|---|---|
| Ballkani | Suharekë | Suva Reka City Stadium | 1,500 | Yes |
| Drita | Gjilan | Gjilan Synthetic Grass Stadium (Note: Drita and Gjilan played their home matches at the Gjilan Synthetic Grass Stadium, instead of their regular stadium Gjilan City Stadium, (Note: Drita and Gjilan use this stadium together and have named the stadium with different names. Drita and their fans named the stadium as Selami Osmani-Bezi Stadium, while Gjilan and their fans named the stadium as Agim Ramadani Stadium, but officially the stadium is named Gjilan City Stadium.) which was under reconstruction.) | 1,500 | Yes |
| Dukagjini | Klinë | 18 June Stadium | 3,000 | Yes |
| Feronikeli | Drenas | Rexhep Rexhepi Stadium | 2,000 | No |
| Fushë Kosova | Fushë Kosovë | Ekrem Grajqevci Stadium | 5,000 | No |
| Gjilani | Gjilan | Gjilan Synthetic Grass Stadium | 1,500 | Yes |
| Liria Prizren | Prizren | Përparim Thaçi Stadium | 15,000 | No |
| Llapi | Podujevë | Zahir Pajaziti Stadium | 10,000 | Yes |
| Malisheva | Malishevë | Liman Gegaj Stadium | 2,000 | Yes |
| Prishtina | Prishtinë | Fadil Vokrri Stadium | 13,000 | No |

=== Personnel and kits ===
| Club | Manager | Captain | Kit manufacturer | Shirt sponsor^{1} | |
|---|---|---|---|---|---|
| Ballkani | (Albania) Ilir Daja | (Montenegro) Edvin Kuč | (Germany) Uhlsport | (Kosovo) Cima Construction | |
| Drita | (North Macedonia) Zekirija Ramadani | (Kosovo) Rron Broja | (Italy) Macron | (Kosovo) AirTiketa | (Kosovo) ALBTECH |
| Dukagjini | (Albania) Armend Dallku | (Albania) Elton Basriu | (Germany) Jako | (Kosovo) Chio Kosova | |
| Feronikeli | (Finland) Shefki Kuqi | (Kosovo) Lapidar Lladrovci | (Germany) Jako | none | |
| Fushë Kosova | (Kosovo) Shpëtim Bajrami | (Kosovo) Nasuf Berisha | (Switzerland) 14fourteen | (Kosovo) Jona Med | |
| Gjilani | (Albania) Gentian Mezani | (Kosovo) Edison Kqiku | (Germany) Jako | (Kosovo) ALBA Petrol | (Kosovo) VALI RANCH |
| Liria Prizren | (Kosovo) Erdogan Brando | rotation | (Germany) MS SPORTS | (Kosovo) ABI Prizren | |
| Llapi | (Kosovo) Tahir Batatina | (Kosovo) Benjamin Emini | (Kosovo) Sporttex | (Kosovo) N.N.SH "Batatina" | |
| Malisheva | (Kosovo) Qëndrim Kida | (Kosovo) Dreni Kryeziu | (Italy) Givova | (Kosovo) ISP Broadcast | (Kosovo) Patroni |
| Prishtina | (Nigeria) Ndubuisi Egbo | (Kosovo) Mërgim Pefqeli | (Kosovo) Phoenix Sport | (Kosovo) IPKO | (Kosovo) NLB Banka Prishtina |

1. On the front of shirt.

=== Managerial changes ===
| Team | Outgoing manager | Date of vacancy | Incoming manager | Date of appointment |
|---|---|---|---|---|
| Gjilani | (Albania) Klodian Duro | 2 August 2023 | (Albania) Gentian Mezani | 17 August 2023 |
| Malisheva | (Kosovo) Senad Alirifa | 24 October 2023 | (Kosovo) Qëndrim Kida | 24 October 2023 |
| Prishtina | (Albania) Debatik Curri | 26 October 2023 | (Nigeria) Ndubuisi Egbo | 26 October 2023 |
| Liria Prizren | (Turkey) Nedim Yiğit | 5 November 2023 | (Kosovo) Astrit Berisha (C) | 5 November 2023 |
| Liria Prizren | (Kosovo) Astrit Berisha (C) | 29 November 2023 | (North Macedonia) Mirsad Jonuz | 29 November 2023 |
| Drita | (Greece) Akis Vavalis | 27 November 2023 | (North Macedonia) Zekirija Ramadani | 30 November 2023 |
| Feronikeli | (North Macedonia) Xhengiz Rexhepi | 28 December 2023 | (Finland) Shefki Kuqi | 29 December 2023 |
| Liria Prizren | (North Macedonia) Mirsad Jonuz | 31 January 2024 | (Turkey) Ali Güneş | 2 February 2024 |
| Liria Prizren | (Turkey) Ali Güneş | 20 March 2024 | (Kosovo) Erdogan Brando | 24 March 2024 |

== League table ==
| Pos | Team | Pld | W | D | L | GF | GA | GD | Pts | Qualification or relegation |
|---|---|---|---|---|---|---|---|---|---|---|
| 1 | Ballkani (C) | 36 | 23 | 9 | 4 | 62 | 26 | +36 | 78 | Qualification for the Champions League first qualifying round |
| 2 | Llapi | 36 | 21 | 8 | 7 | 56 | 27 | +29 | 71 | Qualification for the Europa League first qualifying round (Note: The 2023–24 Kosovar Cup winners qualified for the Europa League first qualifying round. Since the cup winners (Ballkani) qualified based on league position, the Europa League spot was passed to the second-placed team, the Conference League second round spot was passed to the third-placed team, and the Conference League first round spot was passed to the fourth-placed team.) |
| 3 | Drita | 36 | 19 | 10 | 7 | 49 | 27 | +22 | 67 | Qualification for the Conference League second qualifying round |
| 4 | Malisheva | 36 | 17 | 6 | 13 | 58 | 45 | +13 | 57 | Qualification for the Conference League first qualifying round |
| 5 | Prishtina | 36 | 11 | 16 | 9 | 41 | 32 | +9 | 49 | |
| 6 | Gjilani | 36 | 11 | 12 | 13 | 43 | 38 | +5 | 45 (Note: Ranked on head-to-head points (goal difference): Gjilani 5 (+1), Dukagjini 5 (–1)) | |
| 7 | Dukagjini | 36 | 10 | 15 | 11 | 38 | 48 | −10 | 45 | |
| 8 | Feronikeli (O) | 36 | 12 | 8 | 16 | 39 | 47 | −8 | 44 | Qualification for the Relegation play-off |
| 9 | Fushë Kosova (R) | 36 | 4 | 8 | 24 | 20 | 64 | −44 | 20 | Relegation to Kosovo First League |
| 10 | Liria Prizren (R) | 36 | 2 | 8 | 26 | 26 | 78 | −52 | 14 | Relegation to Kosovo First League |

Source: Football Federation of Kosovo (in Albanian)
Rules for classification: 1) Points; 2) Head-to-head points; 3) Head-to-head goal difference; 4) Goal difference; 5) Goals scored; 6) Play-offs (only if needed to decide champions, teams for relegation or teams for UEFA competitions).
(C) Champions; (O) Play-off winners; (R) Relegated

== Results ==
Each team plays each other four times (36 matches each), twice at home and twice away.

=== First half of season ===
| Home \ Away | BAL | DRI | DUK | FER | FKS | GJI | LIR | LLA | MAL | PRI |
|---|---|---|---|---|---|---|---|---|---|---|
| Ballkani | — | 1–0 | 3–1 | 2–0 | 2–1 | 2–1 | 4–1 | 2–1 | 3–2 | 0–0 |
| Drita | 2–1 | — | 2–2 | 3–1 | 1–0 | 2–0 | 1–1 | 2–0 | 1–2 | 3–0 |
| Dukagjini | 1–1 | 1–0 | — | 1–1 | 1–0 | 1–0 | 0–0 | 0–0 | 0–1 | 0–0 |
| Feronikeli | 0–3 | 0–2 | 1–0 | — | 3–0 | 1–0 | 2–1 | 0–3 | 0–0 | 0–0 |
| Fushë Kosova | 0–2 | 1–1 | 0–3 | 0–1 | — | 2–0 | 2–0 | 1–2 | 0–0 | 2–2 |
| Gjilani | 0–0 | 0–1 | 1–1 | 2–1 | 1–0 | — | 1–0 | 0–2 | 1–0 | 0–0 |
| Liria Prizren | 0–1 | 0–0 | 2–2 | 3–5 | 2–1 | 0–4 | — | 0–2 | 0–1 | 2–2 |
| Llapi | 5–3 | 0–1 | 3–0 | 1–0 | 1–1 | 2–1 | 2–0 | — | 0–1 | 0–0 |
| Malisheva | 0–2 | 1–3 | 3–4 | 4–1 | 6–1 | 1–0 | 1–0 | 2–3 | — | 1–0 |
| Prishtina | 1–1 | 1–0 | 2–2 | 3–1 | 1–0 | 2–1 | 1–1 | 2–2 | 3–1 | — |

Source: Soccerway
Legend: Blue = home team win; Yellow = draw; Red = away team win.
For upcoming matches, an "a" indicates there is an article about the rivalry between the two participants.

=== Second half of season ===
| Home \ Away | BAL | DRI | DUK | FER | FKS | GJI | LIR | LLA | MAL | PRI |
|---|---|---|---|---|---|---|---|---|---|---|
| Ballkani | — | 2–2 | 3–0 | 2–2 | 3–0 | 1–1 | 2–0 | 0–0 | 2–0 | 2–1 |
| Drita | 1–0 | — | 2–0 | 0–0 | 3–1 | 2–2 | 4–2 | 0–1 | 1–1 | 1–0 |
| Dukagjini | 1–2 | 1–1 | — | 1–0 | 0–0 | 2–4 | 2–1 | 1–1 | 2–1 | 1–0 |
| Feronikeli | 0–2 | 0–1 | 3–2 | — | 1–0 | 0–0 | 4–1 | 0–1 | 2–1 | 0–0 |
| Fushë Kosova | 2–0 | 1–0 | 1–2 | 0–3 | — | 1–1 | 0–2 | 0–3 | 1–3 | 0–0 |
| Gjilani | 0–2 | 2–1 | 1–1 | 1–1 | 4–0 | — | 3–0 | 1–1 | 2–3 | 1–1 |
| Liria Prizren | 0–3 | 0–1 | 0–0 | 0–2 | 0–0 | 1–3 | — | 1–5 | 0–3 | 0–1 |
| Llapi | 0–1 | 0–1 | 2–1 | 3–2 | 1–0 | 2–1 | 3–0 | — | 1–0 | 0–0 |
| Malisheva | 0–2 | 1–1 | 1–1 | 2–1 | 4–1 | 0–0 | 7–4 | 2–1 | — | 0–1 |
| Prishtina | 0–0 | 1–2 | 5–0 | 2–0 | 5–0 | 1–3 | 3–1 | 0–2 | 0–2 | — |

Source: Soccerway
Legend: Blue = home team win; Yellow = draw; Red = away team win.
For upcoming matches, an "a" indicates there is an article about the rivalry between the two participants.

=== Relegation play-off ===
The two runners-up of the 2023–24 Kosovo First League will face each other in the semi-finals. The winners will then face the Kosovo Superleague eighth-placed team for the final place in the following Superleague season.

1 June 2024
15:00

| Feronikeli | 1–0 | Prishtina e Re |
|---|---|---|
| Shillova 90+7' |

18 June Stadium, Klina, Kosovo
Referee: Visar Kastrati (Kosovo)

== Season statistics and awards ==
=== Top scorers ===
As of 25 April 2024

| # | Player | Club | Goals |
|---|---|---|---|
| 1 | (Kosovo) Muhamet Hyseni | Llapi | 26 |
| 2 | (Kosovo) Drilon Hazrollaj | Malisheva | 25 |
| 3 | (Albania) Nazmi Gripshi | Ballkani | 15 |
| 4 | (Albania) Blerim Krasniqi | Drita | 12 |
| 5 | (Germany) Senad Jarović | Gjilani | 11 |
| 6 | (Kosovo) Altin Aliu | Malisheva | 9 |
| 6 | (Spain) Jalen Blesa (Note: On 13 February 2024, Jalen Blesa was transferred from Prishtina to the Romanian Liga I club Universitatea Craiova.) | Prishtina | 9 |
| 8 | (Kosovo) Besnik Krasniqi | Drita | 8 |
| 8 | (Kosovo) Kushtrim Shabani | Gjilani | 8 |
| 8 | (Albania) Ahmed Januzi | Llapi | 8 |

=== Hat-tricks ===
| Player | For | Against | Result | Date | Round |
|---|---|---|---|---|---|
| (Kosovo) Drilon Hazrollaj | Malisheva | Fushë Kosova | 6–1 (H) | 19 August 2023 | 2 |
| (Kosovo) Drilon Hazrollaj | Malisheva | Gjilani | 3–2 (A) | 3 March 2024 | 23 |
| (Kosovo) Drilon Hazrollaj | Malisheva | Liria Prizren | 7–4 (H) | 18 May 2024 | 35 |

=== "Star of the Week" Award ===
| Week | Player | Club | Ref | Week | Player | Club | Ref |
|---|---|---|---|---|---|---|---|
| 1 | (Kosovo) Arlind Veliu | Malisheva | | 19 | (Kosovo) Diar Vokrri | Llapi | |
| 2 | (Kosovo) Drilon Hazrollaj | Malisheva | | 20 | (Kosovo) Ardian Limani | Prishtina | |
| 3 | (Kosovo) Ilir Blakçori | Llapi | | 21 | (Kosovo) Muhamet Hyseni | Llapi | |
| 4 | (Kosovo) Kenan Haxhihamza | Dukagjini | | 22 | (Kosovo) Drilon Hazrollaj | Malisheva | |
| 5 | (Kosovo) Ergyn Ahmeti | Llapi | | 23 | (Kosovo) Drilon Hazrollaj | Malisheva | |
| 6 | (North Macedonia) Jakup Berisha | Feronikeli | | 24 | (Albania) Nazmi Gripshi | Ballkani | |
| 7 | (Kosovo) Muhamet Hyseni | Llapi | | 25 | (Montenegro) Alden Skrijelj | Fushë Kosova | |
| 8 | (Albania) Nazmi Gripshi | Ballkani | | 26 | (Croatia) Edi Baša | Gjilani | |
| 9 | (Kosovo) Ilir Avdyli | Llapi | | 27 | (Kosovo) Drilon Islami | Prishtina | |
| 10 | (Kosovo) Almir Kryeziu | Ballkani | | 28 | (Germany) Senad Jarović | Gjilani | |
| 11 | (Spain) Jalen Blesa | Prishtina | | 29 | (Albania) Enea Koliçi | Ballkani | |
| 12 | (Kosovo) Lumbardh Dellova | Ballkani | | 30 | (Kosovo) Hasan Hyseni | Prishtina | |
| 13 | (Kosovo) Muhamet Hyseni | Llapi | | 31 | (Kosovo) Muhamet Hyseni | Llapi | |
| 14 | It is not awarded | | | 32 | (Kosovo) Muhamet Hyseni | Llapi | |
| 15 | (Algeria) Walid Hamidi | Ballkani | | 33 | (Kosovo) Bajram Jashanica | Ballkani | |
| 16 | (Albania) Agon Xhaka | Malisheva | | 34 | (Albania) Ahmed Januzi | Llapi | |
| 17 | (Kosovo) Muhamet Hyseni | Llapi | | 35 | (Albania) Bernard Karrica | Ballkani | |
| 18 | (Kosovo) Faton Neziri | Dukagjini | | 36 | (Germany) Senad Jarović | Gjilani | |

== Notes and references ==
=== References ===
"Star of the Week" Award
