= Muhamet Hyseni =

Kosovan footballer (born 2001)

Personal information
- Date of birth: 6 February 2001 (age 25)
- Place of birth: Podujevë, Kosovo under UN administration
- Height: 1.80 m (5 ft 11 in)
- Position: Forward

Team information
- Current team: Farul Constanța (on loan from Horsens)
- Number: 9

Youth career
- Besiana 09
- –2018: Kurda
- 2018–2019: Llapi

Senior career*
| Years | Team | Apps | (Gls) |
| 2018–2021 | Llapi | 37 | (5) |
| 2021–2022 | Malisheva | 11 | (1) |
| 2022–2023 | Feronikeli | 30 | (16) |
| 2023–2024 | Llapi | 34 | (26) |
| 2024– | Horsens | 14 | (0) |
| 2025–2026 | → Llapi (loan) | 26 | (9) |
| 2026– | → Farul Constanța (loan) | 1 | (0) |

International career^{‡}
| 2017 | Kosovo U17 | 1 | (0) |
| 2018–2019 | Kosovo U19 | 2 | (0) |
| 2023–2024 | Kosovo | 2 | (1) |
- * Club domestic league appearances and goals as of 11 October 2026 ‡ National team caps and goals as of 21 November 2023

Muhamet Hyseni (born 6 February 2001) is a Kosovan professional footballer who plays as a forward for Liga I club Farul Constanța, on loan from Danish Superliga club Horsens.

== Club career ==
=== Return to Llapi ===
On 3 July 2023, Hyseni signed a three-year contract with Kosovo Superleague club Llapi. His debut with Llapi came on 13 August against Drita after being named in the starting line-up. Seven days after debut, he scored his first goal for Llapi in his second appearance for the club in a 3–0 home win over Dukagjini in Kosovo Superleague.

=== Horsens ===
On 13 June 2024, Llapi announced the transfer of Hyseni to Danish 1st Division club Horsens. On the same day, the club confirmed that Hyseni's transfer was permanent and signed a five-year contract with him.

==== Second return to Llapi as loan ====
On 1 September 2025, Hyseni returned to Llapi, joining the club on a one-year loan.

== International career ==
From 2017, until 2018, Hyseni has been part of Kosovo at youth international level, respectively has been part of the U17 and U19 teams and he with these teams played three matches. On 10 November 2023, he received a call-up from Kosovo for the UEFA Euro 2024 qualifying matches against Israel, Switzerland and Belarus. His debut with Kosovo came eight days later in the UEFA Euro 2024 qualifying match against Switzerland after coming on as a substitute at 73rd minute in place of Florent Hadergjonaj and scored his side's only goal during a 1–1 away draw.

== Career statistics ==
=== Club ===
As of match played 11 October 2026

Appearances and goals by club, season and competition
| Club | Season | League | | | National cup (Note: Includes Kosovar Cup, Danish Cup) | | Europe | | Other | | Total | |
| Club | Season | Division | Apps | Goals | Apps | Goals | Apps | Goals | Apps | Goals | Apps | Goals |
|---|---|---|---|---|---|---|---|---|---|---|---|---|
| Llapi | 2017–18 | Superleague of Kosovo | 2 | 0 | 0 | 0 | — | | — | | 2 | 0 |
| Llapi | 2018–19 | Superleague of Kosovo | 3 | 0 | 0 | 0 | — | | — | | 3 | 0 |
| Llapi | 2019–20 | Superleague of Kosovo | 11 | 2 | 1 | 0 | — | | — | | 12 | 2 |
| Llapi | 2020–21 | 21 | 3 | 6 | 1 | — | | — | | 27 | 4 | |
| Total | | 37 | 5 | 7 | 1 | — | | — | | 44 | 6 | |
| Malisheva | 2021–22 | Superleague of Kosovo | 11 | 1 | 1 | 0 | — | | 0 | 0 | 12 | 1 |
| Feronikeli | 2022–23 | Kosovo First League | 30 | 16 | 2 | 1 | — | | — | | 32 | 17 |
| Llapi | 2023–24 | Superleague of Kosovo | 34 | 26 | 2 | 1 | — | | — | | 35 | 27 |
| Horsens | 2024–25 | Danish 1st Division | 14 | 0 | 2 | 2 | — | | — | | 16 | 2 |
| Horsens | 2025–26 | Danish 1st Division | 0 | 0 | 0 | 0 | — | | — | | 0 | 0 |
| Horsens | 2026–27 | Danish Superliga | 0 | 0 | — | | — | | — | | 0 | 0 |
| Horsens | Total | | 14 | 0 | 2 | 2 | — | | — | | 16 | 2 |
| Llapi (loan) | 2025–26 | Superleague of Kosovo | 26 | 9 | 5 | 2 | — | | 1 (Note: Appearances in Superleague of Kosovo promotion/relegation play-offs) | 1 | 32 | 12 |
| Farul Constanța (loan) | 2026–27 | Liga I | 1 | 0 | 0 | 0 | — | | — | | 1 | 0 |
| Career total | | | 153 | 57 | 19 | 7 | — | | 1 | 1 | 173 | 65 |

=== International ===
As of match played 21 November 2023

Appearances and goals by national team and year
| National team | Year | Apps | Goals |
|---|---|---|---|
Kosovo
| Kosovo | 2023 | 2 | 1 |
| Kosovo | 2024 | 0 | 0 |
| Total | | 2 | 1 |

Scores and results list Kosovo's goal tally first, score column indicates score after each Hyseni goal.

| No. | Date | Venue | Opponent | Score | Result | Competition |
|---|---|---|---|---|---|---|
| 1. | 18 November 2023 | St. Jakob-Park, Basel, Switzerland | Switzerland | 1–1 | 1–1 | UEFA Euro 2024 qualification |

== Honours ==
Llapi

- Kosovar Cup: 2020–21

Feronikeli

- Kosovo First League: 2022–23

Individual

- Superleague of Kosovo top scorer: 2023–24
