= Drilon Hazrollaj =

Kosovan footballer (born 2004)

Personal information
- Date of birth: 19 February 2004 (age 22)
- Place of birth: Banjë, Kosovo under UN administration
- Height: 1.78 m (5 ft 10 in)
- Position: Right winger

Team information
- Current team: Tirana (on loan from Rapid București)
- Number: 27

Youth career
- –2014: Malisheva
- 2014–2022: Ramiz Sadiku

Senior career*
| Years | Team | Apps | (Gls) |
| 2022–2025 | Malisheva | 87 | (44) |
| 2025– | Rapid București | 14 | (0) |
| 2026– | → Tirana (loan) | 10 | (3) |

International career
| 2022 | Kosovo U19 | 3 | (0) |
| 2023 | Kosovo U21 | 1 | (0) |
- * Club domestic league appearances and goals as of 11 October 2026

Drilon Hazrollaj (born 19 February 2004) is a Kosovan professional footballer who plays as a right winger for Kategoria Superiore club Tirana, on loan from Liga I club Rapid Bucureşti.

== Club career ==
=== Early career / Malisheva ===
Hazrollaj began his career at the hometown club Malisheva, where he then continued his career with Ramiz Sadiku. On 14 July 2022, Hazrollaj returned to Kosovo Superleague side Malisheva. On 21 August, he was named as a Malisheva substitute for the first time in a league match against Gjilani. His debut with Malisheva came three days later against Ferizaj after coming on as a substitute and scored his side's second goal during a 3–1 home win.

=== Rapid București ===
On 29 March 2025, Hazrollaj signed a three-year precontract with Romanian Liga I club Rapid București, and this transfer would become legally effective on 17 June 2025. Rapid București reportedly paid a €900,000 transfer fee. His debut with Rapid București came on 11 July against Argeș Pitești after coming on as a substitute at 67th minute in place of Claudiu Petrila.

== International career ==
=== Under-19 ===
On 13 November 2022, Hazrollaj was named as part of the Kosovo U19 squad for 2023 UEFA European Under-19 Championship qualifications. His debut with Kosovo U19 came four days later against Ukraine U19 after being named in the starting line-up.

=== Under-21 ===
On 18 March 2023, Hazrollaj received a call-up from Kosovo U21 for the friendly matches against Moldova and Turkey. His debut with Kosovo U21 came on 8 September in the UEFA Euro 2025 qualification match against Poland after coming on as a substitute at 83rd minute in place of Milot Avdyli.

After his debut with Kosovo U21, he was no longer part of the team and the team's head coach Afrim Tovërlani declared that until he is the team's head coach, Hazrollaj will not be part of the team, due to the intervention of his agent regarding his playing time.

=== Senior ===
After his expulsion from Kosovo U21, there were reports that he would switch his allegiance to Albania U21. After this on 15 March 2024, Hazrollaj received a call-up from Kosovo for the friendly matches against Armenia and Hungary, but he was an unused substitute in these matches.

== Career statistics ==
=== Club ===
As of match played 11 October 2026

Appearances and goals by club, season and competition
| Club | Season | League | | | National cup (Note: Includes Kosovar Cup) | | Europe | | Other | | Total | |
| Club | Season | Division | Apps | Goals | Apps | Goals | Apps | Goals | Apps | Goals | Apps | Goals |
|---|---|---|---|---|---|---|---|---|---|---|---|---|
| Malisheva | 2022–23 | Superleague of Kosovo | 21 | 7 | 1 | 0 | — | | — | | 22 | 7 |
| Malisheva | 2023–24 | Superleague of Kosovo | 33 | 25 | 3 | 3 | — | | — | | 36 | 28 |
| Malisheva | 2024–25 | Superleague of Kosovo | 33 | 12 | 2 | 1 | 2 (Note: Appearances in UEFA Conference League) | 0 | — | | 37 | 13 |
| Malisheva | Total | | 87 | 44 | 6 | 4 | 2 | 0 | — | | 95 | 48 |
| Rapid București | 2025–26 | Liga I | 14 | 0 | 0 | 0 | — | | — | | 14 | 0 |
| Rapid București | 2026–27 | Liga I | 0 | 0 | — | | — | | — | | 0 | 0 |
| Rapid București | Total | | 14 | 0 | 0 | 0 | — | | — | | 14 | 0 |
| Tirana (loan) | 2026–27 | Kategoria Superiore | 5 | 2 | 0 | 0 | — | | — | | 5 | 2 |
| Career total | | | 106 | 46 | 6 | 4 | 2 | 0 | — | | 114 | 50 |

== Honours ==
Individual

- Superleague of Kosovo "Star of the Week" Award: 2023–24 (Round 2, 22, 23)
- Superleague of Kosovo's Team of the Year: 2024
