= Jalen Blesa =

Spanish footballer (born 2001)

Personal information
- Full name: Jalen Aleix Miller Blesa
- Date of birth: 24 February 2001 (age 25)
- Place of birth: Barcelona, Spain
- Height: 1.87 m (6 ft 2 in)
- Position: Forward

Team information
- Current team: Rio Ave
- Number: 11

Youth career
- Badalona
- PB Anguera
- –2020: Masnou

Senior career*
Years	Team	Apps	(Gls)
2019–2020	Masnou		
2020–2022	Arlesey Town	29	(16)
2022	Istogu		
2022–2023	Rahoveci	14	(10)
2023–2024	Prishtina	33	(10)
2024–2025	Universitatea Craiova	4	(0)
2024–2025	→ Dinamo Batumi (loan)	23	(9)
2025–2026	Cesena	21	(4)
2026–	Rio Ave	13	(7)
- * Club domestic league appearances and goals as of 25 May 2026

Jalen Aleix Miller Blesa (born 21 February 2001) is a Spanish professional footballer who plays as a forward for Portuguese Primeira Liga club Rio Ave.

== Early life ==
Jalen Blesa was born in Barcelona, Spain to American parents, who later relocated to the United Kingdom - holding citizenship of Spain, the United States and the United Kingdom.

== Career ==
Blesa started his career with Spanish side Masnou. In September 2020, he signed for English side Arlesey Town. Subsequently, he signed for Kosovan side Istogu in January 2022 before signing for Kosovan side Rahoveci in July.

On 11 January 2023, Blesa signed for Kosovan side Prishtina, helping the club win the 2023–24 Kosovar Cup and he receiving interest from Moldovan side Sheriff Tiraspol and Ukrainian side Oleksandriya. On 6 February 2023, he debuted and scored his first two goals for them during a 3–1 home win over Dukagjini in the Kosovar Cup.

Following his stint there, Blesa signed for Romanian side Universitatea Craiova in 2024. During the summer of 2024, he was sent on loan to Georgian side Dinamo Batumi. Georgian newspaper Lelo wrote in 2025 that he "has been playing effectively... and this is a great bonus for the Dinamo Batumi" while playing for the club.

On 2 August 2025, Blesa signed with Cesena in Italian Serie B for one season.

On 2 February 2026, Blesa joined Rio Ave in Portugal and signed a four-and-a-half-year contract with the club for an initial fee of €1.7m rising to up to €2m. Blesa was voted Player of the Month for March 2026 in the Portuguese Primeira Liga after scoring 4 goals in 4 games.

== Honours ==
Prishtina

- Kosovar Cup: 2022–23
- Kosovar Supercup: 2023

Individual

- Kosovo Superleague "Star of the Week" Award: 2023–24 (Round 11)
- Portugal Primeira Liga "Player of the Month" Award: 2025–26 (March 2026)
