= 2024–25 UEFA Conference League qualifying (third and play-off round matches) =

European football competition

This page summarises the matches of the third qualifying and play-off rounds of 2024–25 UEFA Conference League qualifying.

Times are CEST (UTC+2), as listed by UEFA (local times, if different, are in parentheses).

== Third qualifying round ==
=== Summary ===
The first legs were played on 6, 7 and 8 August, and the second legs were played on 13, 14 and 15 August 2024.

The winners of the ties advanced to the play-off round of their respective path. The losers were eliminated from European competitions for the season.

Third qualifying round
Team 1	Agg.	Team 2	1st leg	2nd leg
Champions Path
Víkingur Reykjavík (Iceland)	3–2	(Estonia) Flora	1–1	2–1
Ordabasy (Kazakhstan)	0–2	(Armenia) Pyunik	0–1	0–1
Ballkani (Kosovo)	1–1 (1–4 p)	(Northern Ireland) Larne	0–1	1–0 (a.e.t.)
HJK (Finland)	2–2 (4–3 p)	(Montenegro) Dečić	1–0	1–2 (a.e.t.)
Main Path
Mladá Boleslav (Czech Republic)	5–3	(Israel) Hapoel Be'er Sheva	1–1	4–2
Kilmarnock (Scotland)	3–2	(Norway) Tromsø	2–2	1–0
Ararat-Armenia	3–4	(Hungary) Puskás Akadémia	0–1	3–3
Zürich (Switzerland)	0–5	(Portugal) Vitória de Guimarães	0–3	0–2
Paks (Hungary)	5–2	(Montenegro) Mornar	3–0	2–2
BK Häcken (Sweden)	7–2	(Estonia) Paide Linnameeskond	6–1	1–1
Maribor (Slovenia)	2–2 (4–2 p)	(Serbia) Vojvodina	2–1	0–1 (a.e.t.)
Spartak Trnava (Slovakia)	4–4 (11–12 p)	(Poland) Wisła Kraków	3–1	1–3 (a.e.t.)
St Patrick's Athletic (Republic of Ireland)	2–0	(Azerbaijan) Sabah	1–0	1–0
St Mirren (Scotland)	2–4	(Norway) Brann	1–1	1–3
CSKA 1948 (Bulgaria)	2–5	(Cyprus) Pafos	2–1	0–4 (a.e.t.)
Ilves (Finland)	2–4	(Sweden) Djurgårdens IF	1–1	1–3
Corvinul Hunedoara (Romania)	2–8	(Kazakhstan) Astana	1–2	1–6
Ružomberok (Slovakia)	1–0	(Croatia) Hajduk Split	0–0	1–0
Noah (Armenia)	3–2	(Greece) AEK Athens	3–1	0–1
Auda (Latvia)	2–3	(Kosovo) Drita	1–0	1–3 (a.e.t.)
Iberia 1999 (Georgia (country))	0–3	(Turkey) İstanbul Başakşehir	0–1	0–2
Brøndby (Denmark)	3–4	(Poland) Legia Warsaw	2–3	1–1
Maccabi Petah Tikva (Israel)	0–2	(Romania) CFR Cluj	0–1	0–1
Silkeborg (Denmark)	4–5	(Belgium) Gent	2–2	2–3 (a.e.t.)
Osijek (Croatia)	3–3 (1–2 p)	(Azerbaijan) Zira	1–1	2–2 (a.e.t.)
St. Gallen (Switzerland)	4–3	(Poland) Śląsk Wrocław	2–0	2–3
Botev Plovdiv (Bulgaria)	2–3	(Bosnia and Herzegovina) Zrinjski Mostar	2–1	0–2
Omonia (Cyprus)	3–0	(Hungary) Fehérvár	1–0	2–0
Copenhagen (Denmark)	1–1 (2–1 p)	(Czech Republic) Baník Ostrava	1–0	0–1 (a.e.t.)
Olimpija Ljubljana (Slovenia)	4–0	(Moldova) Sheriff Tiraspol	3–0	1–0

=== Champions Path matches ===
8 August 2024
20:15 (18:15 UTC+0)

Víkingur Reykjavík (Iceland)	1–1	(Estonia) Flora
Ingimundarson 40'	Report	Lepik 21' (pen.)

Víkingsvöllur, Reykjavík
Attendance: 1,069
Referee: Ashot Ghaltakhchyan (Armenia)
15 August 2024
18:00 (19:00 UTC+3)

Flora (Estonia)	1–2	(Iceland) Víkingur Reykjavík
Soomets 52'	Report	Þrándarson 6'; Hansen 36'

Lilleküla Stadium, Tallinn
Attendance: 3,028
Referee: Michal Očenáš (Slovakia)

Víkingur Reykjavík won 3–2 on aggregate.

8 August 2024
17:00 (20:00 UTC+5)

Ordabasy (Kazakhstan)	0–1	(Armenia) Pyunik
	Report	Otubanjo 56'

Almaty Central Stadium, Almaty (Note: Ordabasy played their home match at the Almaty Central Stadium, in Almaty, instead of their regular stadium, the Kazhimukan Munaitpasov Stadium, in Shymkent, which did not meet UEFA requirements.)
Attendance: 7,860
Referee: Ondřej Berka (Czech Republic)
15 August 2024
18:00 (20:00 UTC+4)

Pyunik (Armenia)	1–0	(Kazakhstan) Ordabasy
Otubanjo 66'	Report

Vazgen Sargsyan Republican Stadium, Yerevan
Attendance: 6,287
Referee: Miguel Nogueira (Portugal)

Pyunik won 2–0 on aggregate.

8 August 2024
17:30

Ballkani (Kosovo)	0–1	(Northern Ireland) Larne
	Report	Donnelly 89'

Fadil Vokrri Stadium, Pristina (Note: Ballkani played their home matches at the Zahir Pajaziti Stadium in Podujevo and the Fadil Vokrri Stadium in Pristina, instead of their regular stadium, the Suva Reka City Stadium, in Suva Reka, which did not meet UEFA requirements.)
Attendance: 455
Referee: Jakob Sundberg (Denmark)
15 August 2024
21:00 (20:00 UTC+1)

Larne (Northern Ireland)	0–1 (a.e.t.)	(Kosovo) Ballkani
	Report	Hamidi 45' (pen.)
Penalties
Thomson (penalty scored); Randall (penalty scored); Ryan (penalty scored); Gallagher (penalty scored)	4–1	(penalty missed) Hamidi; (penalty missed) Ajazaj; (penalty scored) Dulaj

Inver Park, Larne
Attendance: 2,100
Referee: Robertas Valikonis (Lithuania)

1–1 on aggregate; Larne won 4–1 on penalties.

8 August 2024
19:30 (20:30 UTC+3)

HJK (Finland)	1–0	(Montenegro) Dečić
Erwin 49'	Report

Bolt Arena, Helsinki
Attendance: 4,238
Referee: Sandi Putros (Denmark)
15 August 2024
21:00

Dečić (Montenegro)	2–1 (a.e.t.)	(Finland) HJK
Puleio 26'; Mašović 90+4'	Report	Plange 43'
Penalties
Božović (penalty scored); Chagas (penalty scored); Stijepović (penalty missed); Mašović (penalty scored); Camaj (penalty missed); Drešaj (penalty missed)	3–4	(penalty missed) Lingman; (penalty scored) Erwin; (penalty missed) Meriluoto; (penalty scored) Tomas; (penalty scored) Möller; (penalty scored) Palumets

Podgorica City Stadium, Podgorica (Note: Dečić played their home matches at the Camp FSCG and the Podgorica City Stadium in Podgorica, instead of their regular stadium, the Stadion Tuško Polje, in Tuzi, which did not meet UEFA requirements.)
Attendance: 1,017
Referee: Adam Ladebäck (Sweden)

2–2 on aggregate; HJK won 4–3 on penalties.

=== Main Path matches ===
8 August 2024
18:00

Mladá Boleslav (Czech Republic)	1–1	(Israel) Hapoel Be'er Sheva
Vydra 39' (pen.)	Report	Yosefi 50'

Lokotrans Aréna, Mladá Boleslav
Attendance: 3,766
Referee: Joni Hyytiä (Finland)
15 August 2024
19:00 (20:00 UTC+3)

Hapoel Be'er Sheva (Israel)	2–4	(Czech Republic) Mladá Boleslav
Ahmed 11'; Lopes 42'	Report	Ladra 49', 82'; Králik 59'; Kušej 90'

Gradski stadion, Lovech, Bulgaria (Note: Due to the Gaza war, Israeli teams were required to play their home matches at neutral venues until further notice.)
Attendance: 40
Referee: Joonas Jaanovits (Estonia)

Mladá Boleslav won 5–3 on aggregate.

8 August 2024
20:00 (19:00 UTC+1)

Kilmarnock (Scotland)	2–2	(Norway) Tromsø
Vassell 6'; Wales 90+3'	Report	Romsaas 50', 64'

Rugby Park, Kilmarnock
Attendance: 6,995
Referee: Menelaos Antoniou (Cyprus)
15 August 2024
19:00

Tromsø (Norway)	0–1	(Scotland) Kilmarnock
	Report	Skjærvik 11' (o.g.)

Alfheim Stadion, Tromsø
Attendance: 5,891
Referee: Andrei Chivulete (Romania)

Kilmarnock won 3–2 on aggregate.

8 August 2024
17:00 (19:00 UTC+4)

Ararat-Armenia	0–1	(Hungary) Puskás Akadémia
	Report	Soisalo 89'

Vazgen Sargsyan Republican Stadium, Yerevan
Attendance: 4,000
Referee: Kristoffer Hagenes (Norway)
15 August 2024
21:00

Puskás Akadémia (Hungary)	3–3	Ararat-Armenia
Nagy 7', 47'; Favorov 90+4'	Report	Serobyan 39'; Harutyunyan 43'; Duarte 85'

Pancho Aréna, Felcsút
Attendance: 1,280
Referee: Genc Nuza (Kosovo)

Puskás Akadémia won 4–3 on aggregate.

8 August 2024
19:00

Zürich (Switzerland)	0–3	(Portugal) Vitória de Guimarães
	Report	Mangas 54'; Gómez 88' (o.g.); N. Oliveira 90+3'

Letzigrund, Zürich
Attendance: 9,367
Referee: Marian Barbu (Romania)
15 August 2024
21:15 (20:15 UTC+1)

Vitória de Guimarães (Portugal)	2–0	(Switzerland) Zürich
Silva 58'; Arcanjo 70'	Report

Estádio D. Afonso Henriques, Guimarães
Attendance: 21,196
Referee: Oleksiy Derevinskyi (Ukraine)

Vitória de Guimarães won 5–0 on aggregate.

7 August 2024
19:00

Paks (Hungary)	3–0	(Montenegro) Mornar
Böde 59'; Szabó 90+9' (pen.); Tóth 90+10'	Report

Fehérvári úti Stadion, Paks
Attendance: 2,671
Referee: Dzmitry Dzmitryieu (Belarus)
13 August 2024
20:45

Mornar (Montenegro)	2–2	(Hungary) Paks
Lenzsér 18' (o.g.); Zorić 60'	Report	Windecker 14' (pen.); Zorić 86' (o.g.)

Gradski stadion, Nikšić (Note: Mornar Bar played their home matches at the DG Arena and the Podgorica City Stadium in Podgorica, instead of their regular stadium, the Stadion Topolica, in Bar, which did not meet UEFA requirements.)
Attendance: 788
Referee: Jasper Vergoote (Belgium)

Paks won 5–2 on aggregate.

7 August 2024
19:00

BK Häcken (Sweden)	6–1	(Estonia) Paide Linnameeskond
Amane 5', 6'; Layouni 35', 90+1'; Inoussa 64'; Agbonifo 89'	Report	Ceesay 32'

Bravida Arena, Gothenburg
Attendance: 2,889
Referee: Daniyar Sakhi (Kazakhstan)
13 August 2024
18:30 (19:30 UTC+3)

Paide Linnameeskond (Estonia)	1–1	(Sweden) BK Häcken
Saarma 33'	Report	Lundqvist 7'

Lilleküla Stadium, Tallinn (Note: Paide played their home matches at the Pärnu Rannastaadion in Pärnu and Lilleküla Stadium in Tallinn, instead of their regular stadium, Paide linnastaadion, in Paide, which did not meet UEFA requirements.)
Attendance: 1,470
Referee: Volen Chinkov (Bulgaria)

BK Häcken won 7–2 on aggregate.

8 August 2024
20:15

Maribor (Slovenia)	2–1	(Serbia) Vojvodina
Iličić 59'; Soudani 90+8'	Report	Zady Sery 77'

Ljudski vrt, Maribor
Attendance: 6,850
Referee: Daniel Stefański (Poland)
15 August 2024
20:00

Vojvodina (Serbia)	1–0 (a.e.t.)	(Slovenia) Maribor
Crnomarković 26'	Report
Penalties
Petrović (penalty scored); Savićević (penalty scored); L. Nikolić (penalty missed); Ivanović (penalty missed)	2–4	(penalty scored) Mbina; (penalty scored) Soudani; (penalty scored) J. Repas; (penalty scored) Vrhovec

TSC Arena, Bačka Topola (Note: Vojvodina played their home match at the TSC Arena, in Bačka Topola, instead of their regular stadium, the Karađorđe Stadium, in Novi Sad, due to a new turf being laid.)
Attendance: 1,900
Referee: Gustavo Correia (Portugal)

2–2 on aggregate; Maribor won 4–2 on penalties.

8 August 2024
20:30

Spartak Trnava (Slovakia)	3–1	(Poland) Wisła Kraków
Ďuriš 47', 68'; Azango 60'	Report	Rodado 26'

Anton Malatinský Stadium, Trnava
Attendance: 13,010
Referee: Sayat Karabayev (Kazakhstan)
15 August 2024
20:30

Wisła Kraków (Poland)	3–1 (a.e.t.)	(Slovakia) Spartak Trnava
Rodado 43' (pen.); Starzyński 60'; Uryga 98'	Report	Ďuriš 107'
Penalties
Uryga (penalty scored); Biedrzycki (penalty missed); Jaroch (penalty missed); Rodado (penalty scored); Carbó (penalty scored); Mikulec (penalty scored); Duarte (penalty scored); Gogół (penalty scored); Baena (penalty scored); Kutwa (penalty scored); Broda (penalty scored); Uryga (penalty scored); Biedrzycki (penalty scored); Jaroch (penalty scored)	12–11	(penalty missed) Ďuriš; (penalty scored) Paur; (penalty scored) Kratochvíl; (penalty scored) Kóša; (penalty missed) Bainović; (penalty scored) Kubista; (penalty scored) Corryn; (penalty scored) Ahl; (penalty scored) Holík; (penalty scored) Azango; (penalty scored) Frelih; (penalty scored) Paur; (penalty scored) Kratochvíl; (penalty missed) Kóša

Henryk Reyman Stadium, Kraków
Attendance: 15,099
Referee: Don Robertson (Scotland)

4–4 on aggregate; Wisła Kraków won 12–11 on penalties.

8 August 2024
20:45 (19:45 UTC+1)

St Patrick's Athletic (Republic of Ireland)	1–0	(Azerbaijan) Sabah
Palmer 35'	Report

Tallaght Stadium, Tallaght (Note: St Patrick's Athletic played their third qualifying round and play-off home matches at Tallaght Stadium, Tallaght, instead of their regular stadium, Richmond Park, Dublin.)
Attendance: 4,352
Referee: Vilhjálmur Thórarinsson (Iceland)
15 August 2024
18:00 (20:00 UTC+4)

Sabah (Azerbaijan)	0–1	(Republic of Ireland) St Patrick's Athletic
	Report	Elbouzedi 48'

Bank Respublika Arena, Masazır
Attendance: 6,132
Referee: Marcel Birsan (Romania)

St Patrick's Athletic won 2–0 on aggregate.

8 August 2024
20:45 (19:45 UTC+1)

St Mirren (Scotland)	1–1	(Norway) Brann
Olusanya 90'	Report	Myhre 75'

St Mirren Park, Paisley
Attendance: 7,023
Referee: Matthew De Gabriele (Malta)
15 August 2024
19:00

Brann (Norway)	3–1	(Scotland) St Mirren
Soltvedt 5'; Myhre 85'; Heggebø 88'	Report	Iacovitti 74'

Brann Stadion, Bergen
Attendance: 14,500
Referee: Radoslav Gidzhenov (Bulgaria)

Brann won 4–2 on aggregate.

8 August 2024
19:30 (20:30 UTC+3)

CSKA 1948 (Bulgaria)	2–1	(Cyprus) Pafos
Ilievski 29'; Thalis 51' (pen.)	Report	Tanković 10'

Vasil Levski National Stadium, Sofia (Note: CSKA 1948 played their home matches at the Vasil Levski National Stadium, instead of their regular stadium, the Stadion Bistritsa, which did not meet UEFA requirements.)
Attendance: 879
Referee: Denys Shurman (Ukraine)
15 August 2024
19:00 (20:00 UTC+3)

Pafos (Cyprus)	4–0 (a.e.t.)	(Bulgaria) CSKA 1948
Luckassen 90+7'; Jajá 94'; Anderson 100'; Daskalov 118' (o.g.)	Report

Alphamega Stadium, Limassol (Note: Pafos played their home matches at the Alphamega Stadium in Limassol, instead of their regular stadium, the Stelios Kyriakides Stadium, in Paphos, which did not meet UEFA requirements.)
Attendance: 2,871
Referee: Lothar D'hondt (Belgium)

Pafos won 5–2 on aggregate.

8 August 2024
18:00

Ilves (Finland)	1–1	(Sweden) Djurgårdens IF
Riski 65'	Report	Wikheim 57'

Tammelan Stadion, Tampere
Attendance: 8,017
Referee: Edgars Maļcevs (Latvia)
15 August 2024
19:00

Djurgårdens IF (Sweden)	3–1	(Finland) Ilves
Šabović 14'; Hümmet 43'; Ståhl 52'	Report	Riski 30'

Tele2 Arena, Stockholm
Attendance: 16,258
Referee: Elchin Masiyev (Azerbaijan)

Djurgårdens IF won 4–2 on aggregate.

8 August 2024
20:00 (21:00 UTC+3)

Corvinul Hunedoara (Romania)	1–2	(Kazakhstan) Astana
Manolache 37'	Report	Camara 62'; Chinedu 80'

Sibiu Municipal Stadium, Sibiu (Note: Corvinul Hunedoara played their home match at the Sibiu Municipal Stadium in Sibiu, instead of their regular stadium, the Michael Klein Stadium, in Hunedoara, which did not meet UEFA requirements.)
Attendance: 6,135
Referee: Ishmael Barbara (Malta)
14 August 2024
16:00 (19:00 UTC+5)

Astana (Kazakhstan)	6–1	(Romania) Corvinul Hunedoara
Chinedu 13', 68'; Tomasov 57', 76'; Gripshi 73'; Astanov 84'	Report	Velisar 78'

Almaty Central Stadium, Almaty (Note: Astana played their home matches at the Almaty Central Stadium in Almaty, instead of their regular stadium, the Astana Arena, in Astana, due to renovation works.)
Attendance: 6,725
Referee: Atilla Karaoğlan (Turkey)

Astana won 8–2 on aggregate.

8 August 2024
18:30

Ružomberok (Slovakia)	0–0	(Croatia) Hajduk Split
	Report

Štadión pod Čebraťom, Ružomberok
Attendance: 4,712
Referee: César Soto Grado (Spain)
15 August 2024
21:00

Hajduk Split (Croatia)	0–1	(Slovakia) Ružomberok
	Report	Šarlija 7' (o.g.)

Stadion Poljud, Split
Attendance: 27,205
Referee: Luca Pairetto (Italy)

Ružomberok won 1–0 on aggregate.

6 August 2024
18:00 (20:00 UTC+4)

Noah (Armenia)	3–1	(Greece) AEK Athens
Pinson 33'; Čančarević 67'; Gregório 90+8'	Report	García 22'

Abovyan City Stadium, Abovyan (Note: Noah played their home matches at the Abovyan City Stadium in Abovyan, instead of their regular stadium, the Armavir City Stadium, in Armavir, which did not meet UEFA requirements.)
Attendance: 2,800
Referee: Visar Kastrati (Kosovo)
15 August 2024
19:30 (20:30 UTC+3)

AEK Athens (Greece)	1–0	(Armenia) Noah
Silva 90+2' (o.g.)	Report

Agia Sophia Stadium, Athens
Attendance: 11,468
Referee: Robert Schröder (Germany)

Noah won 3–2 on aggregate.

8 August 2024
19:00 (20:00 UTC+3)

Auda (Latvia)	1–0	(Kosovo) Drita
Tavares 8'	Report

Skonto Stadium, Riga (Note: Auda played their home matches at the Skonto Stadium in Riga, instead of their regular stadium, the Audas stadions, in Kekava, which did not meet UEFA requirements.)
Attendance: 1,546
Referee: Dario Bel (Croatia)
15 August 2024
16:00

Drita (Kosovo)	3–1 (a.e.t.)	(Latvia) Auda
Be. Krasniqi 75' (pen.); Broja 102'; Dabiqaj 115'	Report	Talla 91'

Fadil Vokrri Stadium, Pristina (Note: Drita played their home matches at the Zahir Pajaziti Stadium in Podujevo and the Fadil Vokrri Stadium in Pristina, instead of their regular stadium, the Gjilan City Stadium, in Gjilan, which did not meet UEFA requirements.)
Attendance: 3,155
Referee: Kristoffer Karlsson (Sweden)

Drita won 3–2 on aggregate.

8 August 2024
18:00 (20:00 UTC+4)

Iberia 1999 (Georgia (country))	0–1	(Turkey) İstanbul Başakşehir
	Report	Davidson 87'

Mikheil Meskhi Stadium, Tbilisi
Attendance: 7,880
Referee: David Dickinson (Scotland)
15 August 2024
19:45 (20:45 UTC+3)

İstanbul Başakşehir (Turkey)	2–0	(Georgia (country)) Iberia 1999
Piątek 50'; Pelkas 61'	Report

Başakşehir Fatih Terim Stadium, Istanbul
Attendance: 4,735
Referee: Paweł Raczkowski (Poland)

İstanbul Başakşehir won 3–0 on aggregate.

8 August 2024
19:00

Brøndby (Denmark)	2–3	(Poland) Legia Warsaw
Bundgaard 19'; Kvistgaarden 36'	Report	Pekhart 24'; Luquinhas 70'; Morishita 87'

Brøndby Stadium, Brøndbyvester
Attendance: 19,502
Referee: Martin Dohal (Slovakia)
15 August 2024
18:00

Legia Warsaw (Poland)	1–1	(Denmark) Brøndby
Pankov 45+3'	Report	Wass 38' (pen.)

Polish Army Stadium, Warsaw
Attendance: 26,823
Referee: Chrysovalantis Theouli (Cyprus)

Legia Warsaw won 4–3 on aggregate.

8 August 2024
20:00

Maccabi Petah Tikva (Israel)	0–1	(Romania) CFR Cluj
	Report	Muhar 9'

Stadion Georgi Asparuhov, Sofia, Bulgaria
Attendance: 147
Referee: Patrik Kolarić (Croatia)
15 August 2024
19:00 (20:00 UTC+3)

CFR Cluj (Romania)	1–0	(Israel) Maccabi Petah Tikva
Krešić 50'	Report

Dr. Constantin Rădulescu Stadium, Cluj-Napoca
Attendance: 5,490
Referee: Tamás Bognár (Hungary)

CFR Cluj won 2–0 on aggregate.

8 August 2024
18:30

Silkeborg (Denmark)	2–2	(Belgium) Gent
Adamsen 49' (pen.), 90+5'	Report	Ganchas 61' (o.g.); Dean 90+3'

JYSK Park, Silkeborg
Attendance: 3,712
Referee: Christian-Petru Ciochirca (Austria)
15 August 2024
20:30

Gent (Belgium)	3–2 (a.e.t.)	(Denmark) Silkeborg
Dean 38'; Gandelman 90+3', 118'	Report	Adamsen 33', 51' (pen.)

Planet Group Arena, Ghent
Attendance: 8,769
Referee: José Luis Munuera Montero (Spain)

Gent won 5–4 on aggregate.

8 August 2024
20:00

Osijek (Croatia)	1–1	(Azerbaijan) Zira
Matković 38'	Report	Utzig 90+4' (pen.)

Opus Arena, Osijek
Attendance: 6,432
Referee: Aristotelis Diamantopoulos (Greece)
15 August 2024
18:30 (20:30 UTC+4)

Zira (Azerbaijan)	2–2 (a.e.t.)	(Croatia) Osijek
Alıyev 54' (pen.); Volkovi 90'	Report	Jugović 37'; Matković 81'
Penalties
Alıyev (penalty missed); Ruan Renato (penalty scored); Nuriyev (penalty missed); Isayev (penalty missed); Utzig (penalty scored)	2–1	(penalty missed) Pušić; (penalty scored) Nejašmić; (penalty missed) Ademi; (penalty missed) Pedro Lima; (penalty missed) Mikolčić

Dalga Arena, Baku (Note: Zira played their home matches at the Dalga Arena in Baku, instead of their regular stadium, the Zira Olympic Sport Complex Stadium, in Zirə, which did not meet UEFA requirements.)
Attendance: 4,000
Referee: Julian Weinberger (Austria)

3–3 on aggregate; Zira won 2–1 on penalties.

7 August 2024
20:30

St. Gallen (Switzerland)	2–0	(Poland) Śląsk Wrocław
Akolo 5'; Geubbels 40'	Report

Kybunpark, St. Gallen
Attendance: 15,090
Referee: Jan Petřík (Czech Republic)
15 August 2024
20:30

Śląsk Wrocław (Poland)	3–2	(Switzerland) St. Gallen
Schwarz 41'; Samiec-Talar 43'; Petkov 45+3'	Report	Toma 21'; Geubbels 90+18' (pen.)

Wrocław Stadium, Wrocław
Attendance: 18,053
Referee: Duje Strukan (Croatia)

St. Gallen won 4–3 on aggregate.

8 August 2024
20:00 (21:00 UTC+3)

Botev Plovdiv (Bulgaria)	2–1	(Bosnia and Herzegovina) Zrinjski Mostar
Akere 35'; Maraš 79'	Report	Ćuže 77'

Stadion Hristo Botev, Plovdiv
Attendance: 9,515
Referee: Fábio Veríssimo (Portugal)
15 August 2024
20:00

Zrinjski Mostar (Bosnia and Herzegovina)	2–0	(Bulgaria) Botev Plovdiv
Mulahusejnović 39'; Kiš 83'	Report

Stadion pod Bijelim Brijegom, Mostar
Attendance: 5,300
Referee: Rob Hennessy (Republic of Ireland)

Zrinjski Mostar won 3–2 on aggregate.

8 August 2024
19:00 (20:00 UTC+3)

Omonia (Cyprus)	1–0	(Hungary) Fehérvár
Stępiński 60'	Report

GSP Stadium, Nicosia
Attendance: 15,071
Referee: Lionel Tschudi (Switzerland)
14 August 2024
18:00

Fehérvár (Hungary)	0–2	(Cyprus) Omonia
	Report	Semedo 28'; Kakoullis 90+5'

Sóstói Stadion, Székesfehérvár
Attendance: 3,840
Referee: Jakob Kehlet (Denmark)

Omonia won 3–0 on aggregate.

7 August 2024
19:00

Copenhagen (Denmark)	1–0	(Czech Republic) Baník Ostrava
Froholdt 90+1'	Report

Parken Stadium, Copenhagen
Attendance: 16,513
Referee: Nathan Verboomen (Belgium)
15 August 2024
19:00

Baník Ostrava (Czech Republic)	1–0 (a.e.t.)	(Denmark) Copenhagen
Prekop 42'	Report
Penalties
Klíma (penalty missed); Ewerton (penalty missed); Kubala (penalty scored); Frydrych (penalty missed); Chaluš (penalty missed)	1–2	(penalty missed) Óskarsson; (penalty scored) Mattsson; (penalty missed) Elyounoussi; (penalty scored) Achouri

Městský stadion, Ostrava
Attendance: 14,458
Referee: Stuart Attwell (England)

1–1 on aggregate; Copenhagen won 2–1 on penalties.

8 August 2024
19:00

Olimpija Ljubljana (Slovenia)	3–0	(Moldova) Sheriff Tiraspol
Pedro Lucas 45+4'; Doffo 65'; Sualehe 84'	Report

Stožice Stadium, Ljubljana
Attendance: 3,797
Referee: Vasilios Fotias (Greece)
15 August 2024
19:00 (20:00 UTC+3)

Sheriff Tiraspol (Moldova)	0–1	(Slovenia) Olimpija Ljubljana
	Report	Ne. Motika 88' (pen.)

Sheriff Arena, Tiraspol
Attendance: 2,422
Referee: Maurizio Mariani (Italy)

Olimpija Ljubljana won 4–0 on aggregate.

== Play-off round ==
=== Summary ===
The first legs were played on 20, 21 and 22 August, and the second legs were played on 28 and 29 August 2024.

The winners of the ties advanced to the league phase. The losers were eliminated from European competitions for the season.

Play-off round
Team 1	Agg.	Team 2	1st leg	2nd leg
Champions Path
Lincoln Red Imps (Gibraltar)	3–4	(Northern Ireland) Larne	2–1	1–3
Pyunik (Armenia)	2–4	(Slovenia) Celje	1–0	1–4
Víkingur Reykjavík (Iceland)	5–0	(Andorra) UE Santa Coloma	5–0	0–0
Panevėžys (Lithuania)	0–3	(Wales) The New Saints	0–3	0–0
KÍ (Faroe Islands)	3–4	(Finland) HJK	2–2	1–2
Main Path
Omonia (Cyprus)	6–1	(Azerbaijan) Zira	6–0	0–1
St. Gallen (Switzerland)	1–1 (5–4 p)	(Turkey) Trabzonspor	0–0	1–1 (a.e.t.)
Lens (France)	2–3	(Greece) Panathinaikos	2–1	0–2
BK Häcken (Sweden)	3–5	(Germany) 1. FC Heidenheim	1–2	2–3
Copenhagen (Denmark)	3–1	(Scotland) Kilmarnock	2–0	1–1
Vitória de Guimarães (Portugal)	7–0	(Bosnia and Herzegovina) Zrinjski Mostar	3–0	4–0
Brann (Norway)	2–3	(Kazakhstan) Astana	2–0	0–3
Legia Warsaw (Poland)	3–0	(Kosovo) Drita	2–0	1–0
Rijeka (Croatia)	1–6	(Slovenia) Olimpija Ljubljana	1–1	0–5
Fiorentina (Italy)	4–4 (5–4 p)	(Hungary) Puskás Akadémia	3–3	1–1 (a.e.t.)
Djurgårdens IF (Sweden)	2–0	(Slovenia) Maribor	1–0	1–0
Wisła Kraków (Poland)	5–7	(Belgium) Cercle Brugge	1–6	4–1
Mladá Boleslav (Czech Republic)	5–2	(Hungary) Paks	2–2	3–0
St Patrick's Athletic (Republic of Ireland)	0–2	(Turkey) İstanbul Başakşehir	0–0	0–2
Chelsea (England)	3–2	(Switzerland) Servette	2–0	1–2
CFR Cluj (Romania)	1–3	(Cyprus) Pafos	1–0	0–3
Partizan (Serbia)	0–2	(Belgium) Gent	0–1	0–1
Kryvbas Kryvyi Rih (Ukraine)	0–5	(Spain) Real Betis	0–2	0–3
Noah (Armenia)	4–3	(Slovakia) Ružomberok	3–0	1–3

=== Champions Path matches ===
22 August 2024
20:00

Lincoln Red Imps (Gibraltar)	2–1	(Northern Ireland) Larne
Gómez 23'; Oliver 42'	Report	Lusty 16'

Estádio Algarve, Faro–Loulé, Portugal (Note: Lincoln Red Imps played their home match at the Estádio Algarve, Faro–Loulé, Portugal, due to renovation works at their regular stadium, the Victoria Stadium, and the only other stadium in Gibraltar, the Europa Sports Park, not meeting UEFA requirements.)
Attendance: 220
Referee: Ishmael Barbara (Malta)
29 August 2024
21:00 (20:00 UTC+1)

Larne (Northern Ireland)	3–1	(Gibraltar) Lincoln Red Imps
Ryan 30' (pen.), 43' (pen.), 83'	Report	Lopes 20'

Inver Park, Larne
Attendance: 2,462
Referee: Lukas Fähndrich (Switzerland)

Larne won 4–3 on aggregate.

22 August 2024
18:00 (20:00 UTC+4)

Pyunik (Armenia)	1–0	(Slovenia) Celje
Buhari 59'	Report

Vazgen Sargsyan Republican Stadium, Yerevan
Attendance: 7,768
Referee: Luka Bilbija (Bosnia and Herzegovina)
29 August 2024
20:15

Celje (Slovenia)	4–1	(Armenia) Pyunik
Nemanič 22'; Bobičanec 42' (pen.); Kučys 73', 85'	Report	Cociuc 63' (pen.)

Stadion Z'dežele, Celje
Attendance: 2,837
Referee: Christian-Petru Ciochirca (Austria)

Celje won 4–2 on aggregate.

22 August 2024
20:00 (18:00 UTC+0)

Víkingur Reykjavík (Iceland)	5–0	(Andorra) UE Santa Coloma
Hansen 29', 90+5'; Ingimundarson 53' (pen.), 77'; Vatnhamar 67'	Report

Víkingsvöllur, Reykjavík
Attendance: 1,070
Referee: Ante Čulina (Croatia)
29 August 2024
20:00

UE Santa Coloma (Andorra)	0–0	(Iceland) Víkingur Reykjavík
	Report

Estadi Nacional, Andorra la Vella
Attendance: 268
Referee: Atilla Karaoglan (Turkey)

Víkingur Reykjavík won 5–0 on aggregate.

22 August 2024
18:30 (19:30 UTC+3)

Panevėžys (Lithuania)	0–3	(Wales) The New Saints
	Report	Davies 52'; D. Williams 64'; Clark 90+1'

LFF Stadium, Vilnius (Note: Panevėžys played their home match at the LFF Stadium in Vilnius, instead of their regular stadium, the Aukštaitija Stadium, in Panevėžys, which did not meet UEFA requirements.)
Attendance: 1,035
Referee: Eldorjan Hamiti (Albania)
29 August 2024
19:30 (18:30 UTC+1)

The New Saints (Wales)	0–0	(Lithuania) Panevėžys
	Report

Park Hall, Oswestry
Attendance: 1,097
Referee: Jakob Sundberg (Denmark)

The New Saints won 3–0 on aggregate.

22 August 2024
20:45 (19:45 UTC+1)

KÍ (Faroe Islands)	2–2	(Finland) HJK
Frederiksberg 55' (pen.); Hansson 63'	Report	Erwin 15', 90+3'

Tórsvøllur, Tórshavn (Note: KÍ played their home match at Tórsvøllur, in Tórshavn, instead of their regular stadium, Við Djúpumýrar, in Klaksvík, which did not meet UEFA requirements.)
Attendance: 1,073
Referee: Lawrence Visser (Belgium)
29 August 2024
18:00

HJK (Finland)	2–1	(Faroe Islands) KÍ
Tomas 90'; Erwin 90+3'	Report	Frederiksberg 57'

Bolt Arena, Helsinki
Attendance: 6,665
Referee: David Fuxman (Israel)

HJK won 4–3 on aggregate.

=== Main Path matches ===
22 August 2024
19:00 (20:00 UTC+3)

Omonia (Cyprus)	6–0	(Azerbaijan) Zira
Khammas 13'; Semedo 34' (pen.), 70'; Stępiński 45+1', 54'; Ewandro 60'	Report

GSP Stadium, Nicosia
Attendance: 16,551
Referee: Juri Frischer (Estonia)
29 August 2024
18:00 (20:00 UTC+4)

Zira (Azerbaijan)	1–0	(Cyprus) Omonia
Utzig 79'	Report

Dalga Arena, Baku
Attendance: 1,700
Referee: Vitālijs Spasjoņņikovs (Latvia)

Omonia won 6–1 on aggregate.

22 August 2024
21:00

St. Gallen (Switzerland)	0–0	(Turkey) Trabzonspor
	Report

Kybunpark, St. Gallen
Attendance: 16,291
Referee: Miguel Nogueira (Portugal)
29 August 2024
19:00 (20:00 UTC+3)

Trabzonspor (Turkey)	1–1 (a.e.t.)	(Switzerland) St. Gallen
Destan 52'	Report	Schmidt 31'
Penalties
Denswil (penalty scored); Trézéguet (penalty scored); Barišić (penalty scored); Drăguș (penalty scored); Savić (penalty missed)	4–5	(penalty scored) Milošević; (penalty scored) Vallçi; (penalty scored) Cissé; (penalty scored) Toma; (penalty scored) Ambrosius

Şenol Güneş Sports Complex, Trabzon
Attendance: 26,064
Referee: Andris Treimanis (Latvia)

1–1 on aggregate; St. Gallen won 5–4 on penalties.

22 August 2024
21:00

Lens (France)	2–1	(Greece) Panathinaikos
Frankowski 4'; Saïd 34'	Report	Ioannidis 53'

Stade Bollaert-Delelis, Lens
Attendance: 37,232
Referee: Gergo Bogár (Hungary)
29 August 2024
20:00 (21:00 UTC+3)

Panathinaikos (Greece)	2–0	(France) Lens
Pellistri 62'; Tetê 85'	Report

Olympic Stadium, Athens
Attendance: 58,500
Referee: Juan Martínez Munuera (Spain)

Panathinaikos won 3–2 on aggregate.

22 August 2024
19:00

BK Häcken (Sweden)	1–2	(Germany) 1. FC Heidenheim
Rygaard 36'	Report	Conteh 31'; Scienza 65'

Bravida Arena, Gothenburg
Attendance: 4,135
Referee: Viktor Kopiievskyi (Ukraine)
29 August 2024
20:30

1. FC Heidenheim (Germany)	3–2	(Sweden) BK Häcken
Pieringer 30'; Wanner 84'; Honsak 90+2'	Report	Inoussa 59'; Agbonifo 79'

Voith-Arena, Heidenheim an der Brenz
Attendance: 11,600
Referee: Giorgi Kruashvili (Georgia)

1. FC Heidenheim won 5–3 on aggregate.

22 August 2024
19:00

Copenhagen (Denmark)	2–0	(Scotland) Kilmarnock
Diks 77' (pen.); Falk 90+6'	Report

Parken Stadium, Copenhagen
Attendance: 17,056
Referee: Fabio Maresca (Italy)
29 August 2024
20:00 (19:00 UTC+1)

Kilmarnock (Scotland)	1–1	(Denmark) Copenhagen
Watkins 16'	Report	Mayo 68' (o.g.)

Rugby Park, Kilmarnock
Attendance: 8,083
Referee: Radoslav Gidzhenov (Bulgaria)

Copenhagen won 3–1 on aggregate.

21 August 2024
18:45 (17:45 UTC+1)

Vitória de Guimarães (Portugal)	3–0	(Bosnia and Herzegovina) Zrinjski Mostar
Mangas 46'; Borevković 51'; Mendes 88'	Report

Estádio D. Afonso Henriques, Guimarães
Attendance: 16,007
Referee: Vassilis Fotias (Greece)
29 August 2024
20:00

Zrinjski Mostar (Bosnia and Herzegovina)	0–4	(Portugal) Vitória de Guimarães
	Report	Manu 32' (pen.); Nuno Santos 42'; N. Oliveira 45+4'; Gustavo Silva 71'

Stadion pod Bijelim Brijegom, Mostar
Attendance: 4,500
Referee: Robert Jones (England)

Vitória de Guimarães won 7–0 on aggregate.

22 August 2024
19:00

Brann (Norway)	2–0	(Kazakhstan) Astana
Myhre 12'; Finne 70'	Report

Brann Stadion, Bergen
Attendance: 14,777
Referee: David Šmajc (Slovenia)
29 August 2024
16:00 (19:00 UTC+5)

Astana (Kazakhstan)	3–0	(Norway) Brann
Chinedu 60', 81'; Karimov 90+1'	Report

Almaty Central Stadium, Almaty
Attendance: 8,276
Referee: Aleksandar Stavrev (North Macedonia)

Astana won 3–2 on aggregate.

22 August 2024
18:00

Legia Warsaw (Poland)	2–0	(Kosovo) Drita
Kramer 56'; Gual 83'	Report

Polish Army Stadium, Warsaw
Attendance: 19,316
Referee: Chris Kavanagh (England)
29 August 2024
20:00

Drita (Kosovo)	0–1	(Poland) Legia Warsaw
	Report	Pekhart 90+1'

Fadil Vokrri Stadium, Pristina
Attendance: 6,853
Referee: Daniel Schlager (Germany)

Legia Warsaw won 3–0 on aggregate.

22 August 2024
20:00

Rijeka (Croatia)	1–1	(Slovenia) Olimpija Ljubljana
Ivanović 33'	Report	Pedro Lucas 76' (pen.)

Stadion Rujevica, Rijeka
Attendance: 6,487
Referee: César Soto Grado (Spain)
29 August 2024
19:00

Olimpija Ljubljana (Slovenia)	5–0	(Croatia) Rijeka
Florucz 2'; Thalisson 13', 45'; Kojić 35'; Pedro Lucas 47'	Report

Stožice Stadium, Ljubljana
Attendance: 12,616
Referee: Urs Schnyder (Switzerland)

Olimpija Ljubljana won 6–1 on aggregate.

22 August 2024
20:00

Fiorentina (Italy)	3–3	(Hungary) Puskás Akadémia
Sottil 45+3'; Martínez Quarta 67'; Kean 75'	Report	Nagy 9' (pen.); Soisalo 12'; Golla 89'

Stadio Artemio Franchi, Florence
Attendance: 12,091
Referee: Willy Delajod (France)
29 August 2024
21:00

Puskás Akadémia (Hungary)	1–1 (a.e.t.)	(Italy) Fiorentina
Nagy 90+7' (pen.)	Report	Kean 59'
Penalties
Komáromi (penalty scored); Favorov (penalty scored); Golla (penalty scored); Szolnoki (penalty missed); Nagy (penalty scored)	4–5	(penalty scored) Mandragora; (penalty scored) Kouamé; (penalty scored) Colpani; (penalty scored) Richardson; (penalty scored) Biraghi

Pancho Aréna, Felcsút
Attendance: 3,528
Referee: António Nobre (Portugal)

4–4 on aggregate; Fiorentina won 5–4 on penalties.

22 August 2024
19:00

Djurgårdens IF (Sweden)	1–0	(Slovenia) Maribor
Nguen 69'	Report

Tele2 Arena, Stockholm
Attendance: 12,579
Referee: Jasper Vergoote (Belgium)
29 August 2024
20:15

Maribor (Slovenia)	0–1	(Sweden) Djurgårdens IF
	Report	Hümmet 4'

Ljudski vrt, Maribor
Attendance: 8,150
Referee: Manfredas Lukjančukas (Lithuania)

Djurgårdens IF won 2–0 on aggregate.

22 August 2024
20:30

Wisła Kraków (Poland)	1–6	(Belgium) Cercle Brugge
Rodado 85'	Report	Minda 8'; Somers 10'; Ravych 36'; Denkey 47'; Ouattara 56'; Olaigbe 83'

Henryk Reyman Stadium, Kraków
Attendance: 25,093
Referee: Philip Farrugia (Malta)
29 August 2024
20:00

Cercle Brugge (Belgium)	1–4	(Poland) Wisła Kraków
Felipe Augusto 77'	Report	Uryga 15'; Kiss 18'; Gogół 73'; Zwoliński 90+4'

Jan Breydel Stadium, Bruges
Attendance: 5,654
Referee: Horațiu Feșnic (Romania)

Cercle Brugge won 7–5 on aggregate.

22 August 2024
18:00

Mladá Boleslav (Czech Republic)	2–2	(Hungary) Paks
Kinyik 65' (o.g.); Ladra 90+7'	Report	Böde 80'; Papp 85'

Lokotrans Aréna, Mladá Boleslav
Attendance: 4,029
Referee: Goga Kikacheishvili (Georgia)
29 August 2024
19:00

Paks (Hungary)	0–3	(Czech Republic) Mladá Boleslav
	Report	Jawo 48'; Králik 55'; Pulkrab 90+2'

Fehérvári úti Stadion, Paks
Attendance: 3,684
Referee: Lawrence Visser (Belgium)

Mladá Boleslav won 5–2 on aggregate.

22 August 2024
20:45 (19:45 UTC+1)

St Patrick's Athletic (Republic of Ireland)	0–0	(Turkey) İstanbul Başakşehir
	Report

Tallaght Stadium, Tallaght
Attendance: 6,219
Referee: Mohammad Al-Emara (Finland)
28 August 2024
18:00 (19:00 UTC+3)

İstanbul Başakşehir (Turkey)	2–0	(Republic of Ireland) St Patrick's Athletic
Şahiner 65'; Kemen 82'	Report

Başakşehir Fatih Terim Stadium, Istanbul
Attendance: 6,223
Referee: Balázs Berke (Hungary)

İstanbul Başakşehir won 2–0 on aggregate.

22 August 2024
21:00 (20:00 UTC+1)

Chelsea (England)	2–0	(Switzerland) Servette
Nkunku 50' (pen.); Madueke 76'	Report

Stamford Bridge, London
Attendance: 37,902
Referee: Jérémie Pignard (France)
29 August 2024
20:30

Servette (Switzerland)	2–1	(England) Chelsea
Guillemenot 32'; Crivelli 72'	Report	Nkunku 14' (pen.)

Stade de Genève, Geneva
Attendance: 28,000
Referee: Marco Di Bello (Italy)

Chelsea won 3–2 on aggregate.

22 August 2024
19:30 (20:30 UTC+3)

CFR Cluj (Romania)	1–0	(Cyprus) Pafos
Korenica 17'	Report

Dr. Constantin Rădulescu Stadium, Cluj-Napoca
Attendance: 5,826
Referee: Novak Simović (Serbia)
29 August 2024
19:00 (20:00 UTC+3)

Pafos (Cyprus)	3–0	(Romania) CFR Cluj
Jajá 28'; Goldar 31'; Tanković 49' (pen.)	Report

Alphamega Stadium, Limassol
Attendance: 4,336
Referee: Craig Pawson (England)

Pafos won 3–1 on aggregate.

22 August 2024
20:15

Partizan (Serbia)	0–1	(Belgium) Gent
	Report	Gandelman 16'

Partizan Stadium, Belgrade
Attendance: 0 (Note: The match was played behind closed doors.)
Referee: Elchin Masiyev (Azerbaijan)
28 August 2024
18:00

Gent (Belgium)	1–0	(Serbia) Partizan
Delorge 88'	Report

Planet Group Arena, Ghent
Attendance: 10,437
Referee: Filip Glova (Slovakia)

Gent won 2–0 on aggregate.

22 August 2024
20:00

Kryvbas Kryvyi Rih (Ukraine)	0–2	(Spain) Real Betis
	Report	Ávila 13'; Rodri 62'

Košická futbalová aréna, Košice, Slovakia (Note: Due to the Russian invasion of Ukraine, Ukrainian teams were required to play their home matches at neutral venues until further notice.)
Attendance: 4,372
Referee: Arda Kardeşler (Turkey)
29 August 2024
21:00

Real Betis (Spain)	3–0	(Ukraine) Kryvbas Kryvyi Rih
Ruibal 40'; Ezzalzouli 41', 43'	Report

Estadio Benito Villamarín, Seville
Attendance: 41,445
Referee: Igor Pajac (Croatia)

Real Betis won 5–0 on aggregate.

20 August 2024
18:00 (20:00 UTC+4)

Noah (Armenia)	3–0	(Slovakia) Ružomberok
Gregório 4'; Manvelyan 79' (pen.); Aiás 90+3'	Report

Abovyan City Stadium, Abovyan
Attendance: 3,100
Referee: Joey Kooij (Netherlands)
29 August 2024
18:30

Ružomberok (Slovakia)	3–1	(Armenia) Noah
Luterán 9'; Hladík 45+2'; Boďa 72' (pen.)	Report	Aiás 88'

Štadión pod Čebraťom, Ružomberok
Attendance: 2,535
Referee: John Beaton (Scotland)

Noah won 4–3 on aggregate.
