= 2020–21 FC Prishtina season =

Prishtina
2020–21 season
- President: Remzi Ejupi
- Head coach: Zekirija Ramadani
- Stadium: Fadil Vokrri Stadium
- Superleague: Pre-season
- Cup: Pre-season
- Supercup: Final
- Europa League: Preliminary round
Home colours	Away colours
- All statistics correct as of 21 August 2018.

The 2020–21 season was Football Club Prishtina's 21st consecutive season in the top flight of Kosovar football. In addition to the domestic league, Prishtina will participate in this season's editions of the Kosovar Cup, the Kosovar Supercup, and the UEFA Europa League. This season covers the period from July 2020 to June 2021.

== Season overview ==
=== July and August ===
- On 31 July 2020, Albanian midfielder Ardit Hila resigned.
- On 5 August 2020, Pristina loaned only for European competition matches from Trepça'89, the former Kosovo U21 midfielder Muharrem Jashari.
- On 6 August 2020, Prishtina announced the departure of Labinot Ibrahimi and Ergyn Ahmeti.
- On 7 August 2020, Prishtina announced were three footballers and four members of the team staff tested positive for coronavirus.
- On 8 August 2020, Prishtina announced the signing of Besnik Krasniqi from Ballkani.
- On 9 August 2020, the draw for Europa League was held and Prishtina were drawn against Gibraltarian side Lincoln Red Imps.
- On 10 August 2020, Prishtina announced the signing of Behar Maliqi from Llapi. The following day on 11 August, Prishtina announced the signing of Albin Prapashtica from 2 Korriku.
- On 18 August 2020, On the day of the UEFA Europa League preliminary round match against Gibraltarian side Lincoln Red Imps confirmed eight infected with coronavirus, A few hours after the confirmation, the teams get ready to play and publish the formations, Prishtina published a half formation with many absences and only three substitutes, but the Gibraltarian authorities stopped the match and forced Prishtina to leave the country.
- On 19 August 2020, Prishtina announced the signing of Mërgim Pefqeli from Llapi. In same day, UEFA decides on the continuation of the postponed match against Gibraltarian side Lincoln Red Imps, but on the condition that in the composition of the team are players who have not been to Gibraltar. A few hours later, Prishtina announced that with the approval of UEFA loaned 23 players from the Superleague and First League teams, these players would be part of replacement squad that will travel back to Gibraltar.

== Squad information ==
=== Current squad ===
As of 11 September 2020

Note: Flags indicate national team as defined under FIFA eligibility rules; some limited exceptions apply. Players may hold more than one non-FIFA nationality.

No.	Pos.	Nation	Player
1	GK	(Kosovo) KOS	Alban Muqiqi
2	DF	(Kosovo) KOS	Besnik Krasniqi
4	DF	(Kosovo) KOS	Tun Bardhoku (vice-captain)
5	DF	(Kosovo) KOS	Lumbardh Dellova (on loan from Hajduk Split)
7	MF	(Kosovo) KOS	Lorik Boshnjaku (captain)
8	MF	(Kosovo) KOS	Mërgim Pefqeli
9	FW	(Kosovo) KOS	Leotrim Kryeziu (on loan from Lugano)
10	MF	(Kosovo) KOS	Endrit Krasniqi
11	MF	(Kosovo) KOS	Kreshnik Uka
13	MF	(Kosovo) KOS	Behar Maliqi
15	MF	(Democratic Republic of the Congo) COD	Gauthier Mankenda
16	MF	(Kosovo) KOS	Donat Hasanaj

No.	Pos.	Nation	Player
17	FW	(Kosovo) KOS	Alban Shillova
18	DF	(Albania) ALB	Gledi Mici
20	MF	(Kosovo) KOS	Qëndrim Zyba
21	DF	(Kosovo) KOS	Ermal Vitija
23	MF	(Kosovo) KOS	Leonit Abazi
28	DF	(Kosovo) KOS	Leotrim Bekteshi
33	MF	(Kosovo) KOS	Jon Bajgora
34	FW	(Kosovo) KOS	Albin Prapashtica
35	GK	(Albania) ALB	Egland Haxho
36	GK	(Kosovo) KOS	Adi Hyla
77	FW	(Nigeria) NGA	Otto John
88	MF	(Albania) ALB	Sabien Lilaj

=== Other players under contract ===
Note: Flags indicate national team as defined under FIFA eligibility rules; some limited exceptions apply. Players may hold more than one non-FIFA nationality.

No.	Pos.	Nation	Player
—	GK	(Croatia) CRO	Ivan Jelić
—	DF	(Tunisia) TUN	Ahmed Raddaoui
—	DF	(Kosovo) KOS	Art Maloku
—	DF	(Kosovo) KOS	Erdin Dushi
—	MF	(Kosovo) KOS	Ramush Ramadani

No.	Pos.	Nation	Player
—	MF	(Kosovo) KOS	Trimron Selimi
—	FW	(Kosovo) KOS	Dhurim Zhuri
—	FW	(Kosovo) KOS	Lis Ahmeti
—	FW	(Kosovo) KOS	Nikson Memaj

== Transfers ==
=== In ===
No.	Pos	Nation	Player	Transferred from	Type	Date	Source
13	DF	KVX	Art Maloku	(Kosovo) Vëllaznimi	End of loan	1 August 2020	—
17	FW	KVX	Alban Shillova	(Kosovo) Drenica	End of loan	1 August 2020	—
33	MF	KVX	Jon Bajgora	(Kosovo) Ulpiana	End of loan	1 August 2020	—
—	DF	ALB	Agon Xhaka	(Kosovo) Besa Pejë	End of loan	1 August 2020	—
—	MF	KVX	Ramush Ramadani	(Kosovo) Ulpiana	End of loan	1 August 2020	—
—	MF	KVX	Trimron Selimi	(Kosovo) Ulpiana	End of loan	1 August 2020	—
—	FW	KVX	Lis Ahmeti	(Kosovo) 2 Korriku	End of loan	1 August 2020	—
22	DF	KVX	Besnik Krasniqi	(Kosovo) Ballkani	Free transfer	8 August 2020	
34	FW	KVX	Albin Prapashtica	(Kosovo) 2 Korriku	Free transfer	10 August 2020	
88	MF	KVX	Behar Maliqi	(Kosovo) Llapi	Free transfer	10 August 2020	
—	MF	KVX	Mërgim Pefqeli	(Kosovo) Llapi	Free transfer	19 August 2020	—

=== Out ===
No.	Pos	Nation	Player	Transferred from	Type	Date	Source
88	MF	ALB	Ardit Hila	(Kosovo) Gjilani	Free transfer	31 July 2020	
—	GK	GER	Laurit Behluli	(Kosovo) Kika	Loan	1 August 2020	—
18	MF	KVX	Ergyn Ahmeti	(Kosovo) Drita	Free transfer	6 August 2020	
22	DF	KVX	Labinot Ibrahimi	(Kosovo) Arbëria	Free transfer	6 August 2020	

=== Loan for European competition matches ===
No.	Pos	Nation	Player	Loaned from	Type	Date		Source
No.	Pos	Nation	Player	Loaned from	Type	In	Out	Source
18	MF	KVX	Muharrem Jashari	(Kosovo) Trepça'89	Normal loan	5 August 2020	25 August 2020	
—	GK	KVX	Ardit Nika	(Kosovo) Flamurtari	Urgent loan for replacement squad	19 August 2020	25 August 2020	
—	GK	KVX	Florian Smakiqi	(Kosovo) Feronikeli	Urgent loan for replacement squad	19 August 2020	25 August 2020	
—	GK	ITA	Giacomo Nava	(Kosovo) Llapi	Urgent loan for replacement squad	19 August 2020	21 August 2020	
—	DF	KVX	Bujar Idrizi	(Kosovo) Llapi	Urgent loan for replacement squad	19 August 2020	25 August 2020	
—	DF	ALB	Elvis Prençi	(Kosovo) Llapi	Urgent loan for replacement squad	19 August 2020	25 August 2020	
—	DF	KVX	Gentrit Dumani	(Kosovo) Flamurtari	Urgent loan for replacement squad	19 August 2020	21 August 2020	
—	DF	KVX	Ilir Berisha	(Kosovo) Feronikeli	Urgent loan for replacement squad	19 August 2020	25 August 2020	
—	DF	KVX	Lapidar Lladrovci	(Kosovo) Feronikeli	Urgent loan for replacement squad	19 August 2020	21 August 2020	
—	DF	KVX	Përparim Osmani	(Kosovo) Drenica	Urgent loan for replacement squad	19 August 2020	25 August 2020	
—	DF	KVX	Yll Hoxha	(Kosovo) Feronikeli	Urgent loan for replacement squad	19 August 2020	25 August 2020	
—	MF	KVX	Albert Dabiqaj	(Kosovo) Feronikeli	Urgent loan for replacement squad	19 August 2020	25 August 2020	
—	MF	KVX	Arbnor Muja	(Kosovo) Trepça'89	Urgent loan for replacement squad	19 August 2020	25 August 2020	
—	MF	KVX	Donat Hasanaj	(Kosovo) Flamurtari	Urgent loan for replacement squad	19 August 2020	25 August 2020	
—	MF	KVX	Kastriot Selmani	(Kosovo) Llapi	Urgent loan for replacement squad	19 August 2020	21 August 2020	
—	MF	KVX	Kushtrim Gashi	(Kosovo) Ballkani	Urgent loan for replacement squad	19 August 2020	25 August 2020	
—	MF	MLI	Lassine Traoré	(Kosovo) Trepça'89	Urgent loan for replacement squad	19 August 2020	21 August 2020	
—	MF	KVX	Mentor Zhdrella	(Kosovo) Llapi	Urgent loan for replacement squad	19 August 2020	25 August 2020	
—	MF	KVX	Mërgim Boshnjaku	(Kosovo) Flamurtari	Urgent loan for replacement squad	19 August 2020	25 August 2020	
—	FW	KVX	Adem Maliqi	(Kosovo) Flamurtari	Urgent loan for replacement squad	19 August 2020	25 August 2020	
—	FW	KVX	Ardian Muja	(Kosovo) Trepça'89	Urgent loan for replacement squad	19 August 2020	25 August 2020	
—	FW	KVX	Ermal Krasniqi	(Kosovo) Ballkani	Urgent loan for replacement squad	19 August 2020	25 August 2020	
—	FW	KVX	Leart Emini	(Kosovo) Trepça'89	Urgent loan for replacement squad	19 August 2020	25 August 2020	
—	FW	KVX	Mendurim Hoti	(Kosovo) Feronikeli	Urgent loan for replacement squad	19 August 2020	21 August 2020	
—	FW	KVX	Valmir Veliu	(Kosovo) Llapi	Urgent loan for replacement squad	19 August 2020	25 August 2020	

== Competitions ==
=== Overview ===
Competition	First match	Last match	Starting round	Record							
Competition	First match	Last match	Starting round	Pld	W	D	L	GF	GA	GD	Win %
Football Superleague of Kosovo	19 September 2020	May 2021	Matchday 1	1	1	0	0	3	0	+3	100.00
Kosovar Cup	—	—	—	0	0	0	0	0	0	+0	—
Kosovar Supercup	September 2020		Final	0	0	0	0	0	0	+0	—
Europa League	22 August 2020		Preliminary	1	0	0	1	0	3	−3	0.00
Total				2	1	0	1	3	3	+0	50.00

Source: Competitions

=== Football Superleague of Kosovo ===
==== Standings ====
Pos	Team	Pld	W	D	L	GF	GA	GD	Pts	Qualification or relegation
1	Prishtina (C)	36	24	6	6	65	27	+38	78	Qualification for the Champions League preliminary round
2	Drita	36	22	10	4	59	28	+31	76	Qualification for the Europa Conference League first qualifying round
3	Ballkani	36	23	5	8	79	43	+36	74	
4	Gjilani	36	12	12	12	37	38	−1	48	
5	Llapi	36	13	4	19	49	56	−7	43	Qualification for the Europa Conference League first qualifying round (Note: Llapi qualified for the Europa Conference League first qualifying round by winning the 2020–21 Kosovar Cup.)

Source: Football Federation of Kosovo (in Albanian), TopSporti (in Albanian)
Rules for classification: 1) Points; 2) Head-to-head points; 3) Head-to-head goal difference; 4) Goal difference; 5) Goals scored; 6) Play-offs (only if needed to decide champions, teams for relegation or teams for UEFA competitions).
(C) Champions

==== Matches ====
19 September 2020 1	Prishtina	3–0	Drenica	Pristina, Kosovo
16:00	Bekteshi 31'; E. Krasniqi 46'; John 74'	Report		Stadium: Fadil Vokrri Stadium; Attendance: 0 Referee: Mervan Bejtullahu

22 September 2020 2	Arbëria	v	Prishtina	Dobrajë e Madhe, Lipljan, Kosovo
				Stadium: Sami Kelmendi Stadium

30 September 2020 3	Prishtina	v	Drita	Pristina, Kosovo
				Stadium: Fadil Vokrri Stadium

4 October 2020 4	Trepça'89	v	Prishtina	Mitrovica, Kosovo
				Stadium: Riza Lushta Stadium

5	Prishtina	v	Llapi	Pristina, Kosovo
				Stadium: Fadil Vokrri Stadium

6	Prishtina	v	Besa Pejë	Pristina, Kosovo
				Stadium: Fadil Vokrri Stadium

7	Feronikeli	v	Prishtina	Glogovac, Kosovo
				Stadium: Rexhep Rexhepi Stadium

8	Prishtina	v	Gjilani	Pristina, Kosovo
				Stadium: Fadil Vokrri Stadium

9	Ballkani	v	Prishtina	Suva Reka, Kosovo
				Stadium: Suva Reka City Stadium

=== UEFA Europa League ===
22 August 2020 Preliminary round	Lincoln Red Imps (Gibraltar)	0–3 (awarded)	(Kosovo) Prishtina	Gibraltar
18:00		Report		Stadium: Victoria Stadium; Attendance: 0 Referee: David Munro (Scotland)
