= 2023 Kosovar Supercup =

- Event: Kosovar Supercup
Ballkani	Prishtina
1	2
- Date: 20 January 2024
- Venue: Mardan Sports Complex, Aksu, Turkey
- Attendance: 0

The 2023 Kosovar Supercup was the 32nd edition of the Kosovar Supercup, an annual football match played between the winners of the previous season's Kosovo Superleague and Kosovar Cup competitions. The match was played between Ballkani, champions of the 2022–23 Kosovo Superleague and Prishtina, who beat their opponents to win the 2022–23 Kosovar Cup Final.

Prishtina won the match 2–1 and claimed their 11th Supercup title.

== Match ==
=== Details ===
20 January 2024
13:00 (UTC+03:00)

Ballkani	1–2	Prishtina
Dulaj 79'	Report	Sinani 9'; Kryeziu 46'

Mardan Sports Complex, Aksu, Turkey
Attendance: 0

Ballkani	Prishtina

1	(Albania) Enea Koliçi (GK)
20	(Montenegro) Edvin Kuč (C) (substituted off) 74'
2	(Kosovo) Armend Thaqi
32	(Kosovo) Bajram Jashanica (yellow card) 55' (substituted off) 62'
4	(Kosovo) Gentrit Halili
3	(Kosovo) Arbër Potoku (substituted off) 62'
11	(Kosovo) Qëndrim Zyba
7	(Algeria) Walid Hamidi
13	(Albania) Marsel Ismailgeci (substituted off) 62'
10	(Albania) Nazmi Gripshi
9	(Kosovo) Albin Berisha (substituted off) 74'
Substitutions:
92	(Montenegro) Damir Ljuljanović (GK)
5	(Kosovo) Lumbardh Dellova (substituted on) 62' (yellow card) 88'
19	(Albania) Lorenc Trashi (substituted on) 62'
8	(Germany) Vesel Limaj (substituted on) 62'
80	(Senegal) Mamadou Danfa
99	(Kosovo) Bleart Tolaj
25	(Albania) Bernard Karrica
33	(Ivory Coast) Bangaly Diawara (substituted on) 74'
27	(Kosovo) Edi Maksutaj
28	(Kosovo) Arjol Bllaca
88	(Kosovo) Arbnor Halitjaha
22	(Kosovo) Krenar Dulaj (substituted on) 74' (goal) 79'
Manager:
(Albania) Ilir Daja

50	(Kosovo) Agron Kolaj (GK)
20	(Kosovo) Ramiz Bytyqi
14	(Kosovo) Egzon Sinani 9' (substituted off) 46'
22	(North Macedonia) Muhamed Useini
11	(Kosovo) Ardian Muja
5	(Kosovo) Drilon Islami
8	(Kosovo) Kushtrim Gashi (yellow card) 38' (substituted off) 60'
77	(Kosovo) Mërgim Pefqeli (C)
7	(Kosovo) Hasan Hyseni (substituted off) 86'
28	(Kosovo) Kreshnik Uka (substituted off) 86'
9	(Kosovo) Leotrim Kryeziu (yellow card) 45+5' (goal) 46' (substituted off) 65'
Substitutions:
12	(Kosovo) Ardit Nika (GK)
3	(Kosovo) Ardian Limani (substituted on) 46'
4	(Albania) Besir Ramadani (substituted on) 60'
10	(Kosovo) Albin Krasniqi
13	(Kosovo) Dion Gallapeni (substituted on) 86'
17	(Kosovo) Rilind Nimani
19	(Kosovo) Ylber Murturi
21	(Kosovo) Genc Hamiti
27	(Kosovo) Olt Pllana
29	(Kosovo) Igball Jashari
30	(Kosovo) Amar Demolli (substituted on) 86'
99	(Spain) Jalen Blesa (substituted on) 65'
Manager:
(Nigeria) Ndubuisi Egbo

== See also ==
- 2022–23 Football Superleague of Kosovo
- 2022–23 Kosovar Cup
