= 2021 Kosovar Supercup =

- Event: Kosovar Supercup
Prishtina	Llapi
1	3
- Date: 17 August 2021
- Venue: Fadil Vokrri Stadium, Pristina, Kosovo
- Referee: Dardan Çaka
- Attendance: 4,000

The 2021 Kosovar Supercup was the 30th edition of the Kosovar Supercup, an annual football match played between the winners of the previous season's Kosovo Superleague and Kosovar Cup competitions. The match was played between Prishtina, champions of the 2020–21 Kosovo Superleague and Llapi, who beat their opponents to win the 2020–21 Kosovar Cup Final.

Llapi won the match 3–1 and claimed their first Supercup title. Also this match was the inaugural match of the VAR system in Kosovar football.

== Match ==
=== Details ===
17 August 2021
20:45

Prishtina	1–3	Llapi
Otto John 66'	Report	Festim Alidema 86' (pen.), 114' (pen.); Valmir Veliu 101'

Fadil Vokrri Stadium, Pristina, Kosovo
Attendance: 4,000
Referee: Dardan Çaka (Kosovo)

Prishtina	Llapi

1	(Kosovo) Betim Halimi (GK) (yellow card) 84' (yellow-red card) 107'
2	(Kosovo) Besnik Krasniqi
3	(Kosovo) Gledi Mici
28	(Kosovo) Leotrim Bekteshi
32	(Albania) Kristi Vangjeli
7	(Kosovo) Lorik Boshnjaku (C) (substituted off) 57'
80	(Kosovo) Florent Avdyli
10	(Kosovo) Endrit Krasniqi (yellow card) 26' (yellow-red card) 27'
11	(Kosovo) Mendurim Hoti
8	(Kosovo) Xhevdet Shabani (substituted off)
9	(Kosovo) Leotrim Kryeziu (substituted off) 114'
Substitutions:
12	(Kosovo) Ardit Nika (GK)
35	(Albania) Eglant Haxho (GK) (substituted in) 114'
6	(Kosovo) Arlind Shabani (substituted in)
18	(Ghana) Samuel Mone Andoh (substituted in)
21	(Kosovo) Bleart Tolaj (substituted in)
22	(Kosovo) Olti Mehmeti
77	(Nigeria) Otto John (substituted in) 57' (goal) 66'
Manager:
(North Macedonia) Zekirija Ramadani

1	(Croatia) Marijan Ćorić (GK)
4	(Kosovo) Bujar Idrizi (C)
5	(Albania) Elvis Prençi (yellow card) 26'
33	(Brazil) Bianor Neto
8	(Kosovo) Benjamin Emini
23	(Kosovo) Kushtrim Shabani
10	(Kosovo) Arbnor Ramadani (yellow card) 61' (yellow-red card) 72'
31	(Mexico) Francisco Rivera
14	(Kosovo) Adem Maliqi
18	(Kosovo) Edon Sadriu
17	(Kosovo) Alban Shillova
Substitutions:
90	(Kosovo) Ilir Avdyli (GK)
11	(Kosovo) Kastriot Selmani (substituted in)
16	(Kosovo) Ilir Krasniqi
77	(Kosovo) Valmir Veliu (substituted in) (goal) 101'
97	(Kosovo) Festim Alidema (substituted in) (goal) 86' (pen.), 114' (pen.)
98	(Brazil) Alef Firmino
99	(Kosovo) Drilon Fazliu (substituted in)
Manager:
(Kosovo) Tahir Batatina

== Match officials ==
Referee: Dardan Çaka

1st Assistant: Fatlum Berisha

2nd Assistant: Bujar Selimaj

4th Official: Mervan Bejtullahu

VAR: Visar Kastrati

AVAR: Elvis Bicaj

VAR Operator: Albert Vokshi

Referee Observer: Malazog Hoxha

Delegate: Abdyl Bellopoja

== See also ==
- 2020–21 Football Superleague of Kosovo
- 2020–21 Kosovar Cup
