= 2020 Kosovar Supercup =

- Event: Kosovar Supercup
Drita	Prishtina
1	3
- Date: 23 January 2021
- Venue: Mardan Sports Complex, Aksu, Antalya, Turkey
- Referee: Abdulkadir Bitigen
- Attendance: 0

The 2020 Kosovar Supercup was the 29th edition of the Kosovar Supercup, an annual football match played between the winners of the previous season's Kosovo Superleague and Kosovar Cup competitions. The match was played between Drita, champions of the 2019–20 Kosovo Superleague and Prishtina, who beat their opponents to win the 2019–20 Kosovar Cup Final. Prishtina won the match 3–1 and claimed their 10th Supercup title.

== Match ==
=== Details ===
23 January 2021
14:00 (UTC+03:00)

Drita	1–3	Prishtina
Rexha 8'	Report	Zyba 3'; Krasniqi 21' (pen.); Shillova 90+3'

Mardan Sports Complex, Aksu, Antalya, Turkey
Attendance: 0
Referee: Abdulkadir Bitigen (Turkey)

Drita	Prishtina

94	(Kosovo) Leutrim Rexhepi (GK)
18	(Kosovo) Ilir Blakçori
3	(Ghana) Jamal Arago
4	(Kosovo) Fidan Gërbeshi
5	(Kosovo) Ardian Limani (C)
7	(Kosovo) Hamdi Namani
20	(Albania) Erjon Vucaj (substituted off) 72'
17	(Kosovo) Almir Ajzeraj (substituted off) 69'
27	(Kosovo) Astrit Fazliu
10	(Kosovo) Xhevdet Shabani
24	(Kosovo) Kastriot Rexha 8'
Substitutions:
99	(Kosovo) Dorant Ramadani (GK)
77	(North Macedonia) Vladica Brdarovski (substituted on) 45' (yellow card) 71'
23	(Kosovo) Drilon Islami
8	(Kosovo) Ergyn Ahmeti (substituted on) 72'
25	(Kosovo) Bujar Shabani (substituted on) 45'
22	(Kosovo) Betim Haxhimusa
97	(Kosovo) Festim Alidema (substituted on) 69'
Manager:
(North Macedonia) Ardian Nuhiu

35	(Albania) Egland Haxho (GK) (substituted off) 40'
2	(Kosovo) Besnik Krasniqi (yellow card) 17' (goal) 21' (pen.)
5	(Kosovo) Lumbardh Dellova
34	(Kosovo) Leotrim Bekteshi
18	(Albania) Gledi Mici
7	(Kosovo) Lorik Boshnjaku (C)
88	(Albania) Sabien Lilaj (yellow card) 90+1'
20	(Kosovo) Qëndrim Zyba 3'
10	(Kosovo) Endrit Krasniqi
23	(Kosovo) Leonit Abazi
9	(Kosovo) Leotrim Kryeziu (yellow card) 34'
Substitutions:
12	(Kosovo) Ardit Nika (GK) (substituted on) 40'
22	(Albania) Gentian Muça
4	(Kosovo) Tun Bardhoku (substituted on) 88'
8	(Kosovo) Mërgim Pefqeli
77	(Albania) Enis Gavazaj
27	(Kosovo) Albin Prapashtica
17	(Kosovo) Alban Shillova (substituted on) 88' (goal) 90+3'
Manager:
(North Macedonia) Zekirija Ramadani

== See also ==
- 2019–20 Football Superleague of Kosovo
- 2019–20 Kosovar Cup
- FC Drita–FC Prishtina rivalry

== Notes and references ==
=== Notes ===
1. The match was played behind closed doors due to the COVID-19 pandemic.
