= 2022 Kosovar Supercup =

- Event: Kosovar Supercup
Ballkani	Llapi
1	0
- Date: 21 January 2023
- Venue: Titanic Deluxe Football Center, Belek, Turkey
- Referee: Krzysztof Jakubik (Poland)
- Attendance: 0

The 2022 Kosovar Supercup was the 31st edition of the Kosovar Supercup, an annual football match played between the winners of the previous season's Kosovo Superleague and Kosovar Cup competitions. The match was played between Ballkani, champions of the 2021–22 Kosovo Superleague and Llapi, who beat their opponents to win the 2021–22 Kosovar Cup Final.

Ballkani won the match 1–0 and claimed their first Supercup title.

== Match ==
=== Details ===
21 January 2023
15:00 (UTC+03:00)

Ballkani	1–0	Llapi
Dellova 62'	Report

Titanic Deluxe Football Center, Belek, Turkey
Referee: Krzysztof Jakubik (Poland)

Ballkani	Llapi

77	(Albania) Stivi Frashëri (GK)
20	(Montenegro) Edvin Kuč (C)
2	(Kosovo) Armend Thaqi
32	(Kosovo) Bajram Jashanica
5	(Kosovo) Lumbardh Dellova
3	(Kosovo) Arbër Potoku
11	(Kosovo) Qëndrim Zyba
6	(Kosovo) Lindon Emërllahu
10	(Albania) Nazmi Gripshi
7	(Kosovo) Meriton Korenica
80	(Kosovo) Albin Berisha
Substitutions:
92	(Montenegro) Damir Ljuljanović (GK)
28	(Kosovo) Leotrim Bekteshi
4	(Kosovo) Astrit Thaqi
21	(Kosovo) Albin Kapra
18	(Kosovo) Leonard Shala
88	(Liberia) Van-Dave Harmon
25	(Kosovo) Veton Tusha
8	(Albania) Lorenc Trashi
22	(Kosovo) Krenar Dulaj
Manager:
(Albania) Ilir Daja

1	(Kosovo) Ilir Avdyli (GK)
23	(Kosovo) Kushtrim Shabani (C)
20	(Brazil) Fernandinho
33	(Brazil) Bianor Neto
16	(Kosovo) Ilir Krasniqi
22	(Kosovo) Bekim Maliqi
21	(Albania) Andri Stafa
10	(Mexico) Francisco Rivera
11	(Kosovo) Trimror Selimi
77	(Albania) Gerhard Progni
18	(Kosovo) Rinor Hoxha
Substitutions:
64	(Kosovo) Art Hoti (GK)
15	(Kosovo) Diar Vokrri
17	(Kosovo) Albion Kurtaj
97	(Kosovo) Festim Alidema
9	(Brazil) Alef Firmino
99	(Kosovo) Drilon Fazliu
27	(Kosovo) Arianit Hasani
80	(Kosovo) Egzon Qerimi
7	(Kosovo) Nderim Hasani
Manager:
(Kosovo) Tahir Batatina

== See also ==
- 2021–22 Football Superleague of Kosovo
- 2021–22 Kosovar Cup
