= 2023–24 Kosovar Cup =

Tournament details
- Country: Kosovo
- Teams: 34

Final positions
- Champions: Ballkani
- Runners-up: Prishtina

Tournament statistics
- Matches played: 34
- Goals scored: 112 (3.29 per match)
- Top goal scorer(s): (Albania) Nazmi Gripshi (6 goals)
- All statistics correct as of 22 May 2024.

The 2023–24 Kosovar Cup is the football knockout competition of Kosovo in the 2023–24 season. The winners qualify for the 2024–25 UEFA Europa League first qualifying round.

== Format ==
Clubs from the lower leagues (Second League and Third League of Kosovo) will enter the preliminary rounds. Participating clubs will compete in a knockout format until only two teams remain.

The two qualified clubs will then advance to the Round of 32, where they will join the clubs from the Superleague and First League of Kosovo. From this point onwards, the competition will follow a straight knock-out round system.

Round	Date	Matches	Clubs
First Round	22 November 2023	2	34 → 32
Round of 32	5–8 December 2023	16	32 → 16
Round of 16	3–4 February 2024	8	16 → 8
Quarterfinals	6–7 March 2024	4	8 → 4
Semifinals	3–17 April 2024	4	4 → 2
Final	22 May 2024	1	2 → 1

== Participating clubs ==
The following teams participated in the competition:

Superliga the 10 clubs of the 2023–24 Superleague	Liga e Parë the 20 clubs of the First League	Liga e Dytë the 3 clubs of the Second League	Liga e Tretë the club of the Third League
Ballkani; Drita; Dukagjini; Feronikeli 74; Fushë Kosova; Gjilani; Liria; Llapi; Malisheva; Prishtina	2 Korriku; Dinamo Ferizaj; Drenica; Ferizaj; Flamurtari; Istogu; Kika; Phoenix; Prishtina e Re; Rahoveci; Ramiz Sadiku; Rilindja 1974; Suhareka; Trepça; Trepça '89; Ulpiana; Vëllaznimi; Vjosa; Vllaznia Pozheran; Vushtrria	Behar; Dardania; KEK-u	Istogu 03

== Preliminary rounds ==
=== First round ===
The draw for the First Round was held on 17 November 2023 in the offices of the Football Federation of Kosovo. Only 4 teams from the Second League and the Third League of Kosovo participated in this round. The winners of each tie qualified automatically for the Round of 32.

No	Date	Matches		
1	22.11.2023	Istogu 03 (IV)	0–4	Behar (III)
2	22.11.2023	KEK-u (III)	w/o	Dardania (III)

=== Round of 32 ===
The draw for the Round of 32 took place on 1 December 2023, 11:00 CET. Teams from Kosovo Superleague and First League of Kosovo were automatically qualified for the Round of 32, alongside the two teams previously qualified from the first round.

This round contained 16 single-legged ties. All matches kicked-off at 12:00 CET.

No	Date	Matches		
1	05.12.2023	Llapi (I)	4–1	Phoenix (II)
2	05.12.2023	Malisheva (I)	3–2	Kika (II)
3	06.12.2023	Flamurtari (II)	0–3	Dukagjini (I)
4	06.12.2023	Rahoveci (II)	0–2	Prishtina (I)
5	06.12.2023	Fushë Kosova (I)	1–3	2 Korriku (II)
6	06.12.2023	Vllaznia Pozheran (II)	2–4	Trepça '89 (II)
7	06.12.2023	Ramiz Sadiku (II)	1–3	Gjilani (I)
8	06.12.2023	Feronikeli 74 (I)	2–0	Istogu (II)
9	06.12.2023	Dardania (III)	0–9	Drita (I)
10	06.12.2023	Liria (I)	2–2 (4–5 p)	Rilindja 1974 (II)
11	06.12.2023	Vëllaznimi (II)	2–1	Ferizaj (II)
12	06.12.2023	Drenica (II)	0–2	Ballkani (I)
13	07.12.2023	Prishtina e Re (II)	7–1	Behar (III)
14	07.12.2023	Suhareka (II)	2–0	Trepça (II)
15	07.12.2023	Ulpiana (II)	1–2	Vjosa (II)
16	08.12.2023	Dinamo Ferizaj (II)	1–0	Vushtrria (II)

== Round of 16 ==
The draw for the Round of 16 took place on 12 December 2023, 11:00 CET. This round contained 8 single-legged ties with matches scheduled for early February 2024, with all matches kicking-off at 13:00 CET.

=== Summary ===
No	Date	Matches		
1	03.02.2024	Gjilani (I)	0–0 (1–4 p)	Prishtina (I)
2	03.02.2024	Vjosa (II)	4–1	2 Korriku (II)
3	03.02.2024	Feronikeli 74 (I)	1–3	Malisheva (I)
4	03.02.2024	Suhareka (II)	3–1	Prishtina e Re (II)
5	04.02.2024	Trepça '89 (II)	4–3 (a.e.t.)	Llapi (I)
6	04.02.2024	Drita (I)	3–0	Rilindja 1974 (II)
7	04.02.2024	Ballkani (I)	1–0	Vëllaznimi (II)
8	04.02.2024	Dukagjini (I)	1–0	Dinamo Ferizaj (II)

== Quarterfinals ==
The draw for the quarterfinals took place on 14 February 2024. The quarterfinals had 4 pairs of single-legged ties. Matches took place on 6 and 7 March 2024.

=== Summary ===
No	Date	Stadium	Referee	Matches		
1	06.03.2024	Sami Kelmendi Stadium	Genc Nuza	Prishtina (I)	5–1	Trepça '89 (II)
2	06.03.2024	18 June Stadium	Mervan Bejtullahu	Dukagjini (I)	0–0 (3–4 p)	Drita (I)
3	07.03.2024	Shtime City Stadium	Ilir Mehmeti	Vjosa (II)	0–1	Suhareka (II)
4	07.03.2024	Liman Gegaj Stadium	Alban Shala	Malisheva (I)	0–3	Ballkani (I)

== Semifinals ==
The draw for the semifinals took place on 15 March 2024 at the Football Federation offices. Four teams will get drawn in two pairs playing each other twice, home and away.

=== Summary ===
The first legs will be played on 3 April, and the returning legs will be played on 24 April 2024. Firstly, scheduled for 17 April the returning matches were postponed after April 17 got declared a day of mourning from the President of Kosovo.

Team 1	Agg.	Team 2	1st leg	2nd leg
Suhareka (II)	2–3	Ballkani (I)	0–1	2–2
Prishtina (I)	1–0	Drita (I)	0–0	1–0 (a.e.t.)

=== Matches ===
==== First leg ====
3 April 2024	Suhareka	0–1	Ballkani	Suhareka
13:00 (UTC+2)		Report	Ismailgeci 90'	Stadium: Suhareka City Stadium; Referee: Alban Shala

3 April 2024	Prishtina	0–0	Drita	Lipjan
13:00 (UTC+2)		Report		Stadium: Stadiumi "Sami Kelmendi"; Referee: Genc Nuza

==== Second leg ====
24 April 2024	Ballkani	2–2 (3–2 agg.)	Suhareka	Suhareka
15:00 (UTC+1)	Gentrit Halili 10'; Nazmi Gripshi 73'	Report	Fitim Susuri 81' 90+1'	Stadium: Suhareka City Stadium

24 April 2024	Drita	0–1 (a.e.t.) (1–0 agg.)	Prishtina	Gjilan
15:00 (UTC+1)		Report	Albert Dabiqaj (o.g.) 111'	Stadium: Stadium with synthetic grass

Some of the information might be subject of change in the future.

== Final ==
The final will be played on May 22 2024.

=== Summary ===
According to the Kosovar Cup regulations, the final shall be played in the capital city of Prishtina. However, due to pitch construction at Fadil Vokrri Stadium at that time, the final was decided to be played at Rexhep Rexhepi Stadium in Drenas.

=== Details ===
The "home" team (for administrative purposes) was determined by the semi-final draw order.

22 May 2024
15:00 CEST (UTC+02:00)

Ballkani	2–2 (a.e.t.)	Prishtina
Hamidi 21'; Korenica 53'	Report	Krasniqi 78', 83' (pen.)
Penalties
Gripshi (penalty scored); Thaqi (penalty scored); Dellova (penalty scored); Tolaj (penalty missed); Ismailgeci (penalty scored)	4–2	(penalty missed) Krasniqi; (penalty scored) Bytyqi; (penalty missed) Muja; (penalty scored) Nimani

Rexhep Rexhepi Stadium, Drenas, Kosovo
Referee: Genc Nuza (Kosovo)

Ballkani	Prishtina

GK	1	(Albania) Enea Koliçi
LB	3	(Kosovo) Arbër Potoku	(yellow card) 76'
CB	5	(Kosovo) Lumbardh Dellova
CB	32	(Kosovo) Bajram Jashanica
RB	2	(Kosovo) Armend Thaqi
DM	6	(Kosovo) Lindon Emërllahu
CM	7	(Kosovo) Meriton Korenica	(yellow card) 56'
CM	20	(Montenegro) Edvin Kuč (c)	(yellow card) 66'
LW	98	(Kosovo) Almir Kryeziu		(substituted off) 65'
RW	11	(Algeria) Walid Hamidi		(substituted off) 86'
CF	10	(Albania) Nazmi Gripshi
Substitutes:
GK	92	(Montenegro) Damir Ljuljanović
LB	14	(Albania) Marsel Ismailgeci		(substituted on) 65'
LB	19	(Albania) Lorenc Trashi
CB	4	(Kosovo) Gentrit Halili
DM	28	(Kosovo) Arjol Bllaca
CM	33	(Ivory Coast) Bangaly Diawara
CM	8	(Germany) Vesel Limaj
CM	88	(Brazil) Queven
LW	25	(Albania) Bernard Karrica
RW	99	(Kosovo) Bleart Tolaj		(substituted on) 76'
CF	22	(Kosovo) Krenar Dulaj
Manager:
(Albania) Ilir Daja

GK	12	(Kosovo) Ardit Nika
LB	11	(Kosovo) Ardian Muja
CB	14	(Kosovo) Egzon Sinani	(yellow card) 39'	(substituted off) 57'
CB	22	(North Macedonia) Muhamed Useini	(yellow card) 76'
RB	4	(Kosovo) Ardian Limani
DM	5	(Kosovo) Drilon Islami
DM	8	(Kosovo) Kushtrim Gashi		(substituted off) 85'
LW	7	(Kosovo) Hasan Hyseni
AM	21	(Kosovo) Genc Hamiti		(substituted off) 57'
RW	77	(Kosovo) Mërgim Pefqeli (c)		(substituted off) 57'
CF	9	(Kosovo) Leotrim Kryeziu
Substitutes:
GK	50	(Kosovo) Agron Kolaj
LB	13	(Kosovo) Dion Gallapeni		(substituted on) 57'
CB	2	(Kosovo) Andi Veliqi
RB	20	(Kosovo) Ramiz Bytyqi		(substituted on) 57'
DM	19	(Kosovo) Ylber Murturi
DM	17	(Kosovo) Rilind Nimani		(substituted on) 85'
CM	25	(Kosovo) Donart Llabjani
LW	23	(Kosovo) Sinan Kadiri
LW	29	(Kosovo) Igball Jashari
LW	70	(Ivory Coast) Yoan Marc-Olivier
RW	30	(Kosovo) Amar Demolli
SS	10	(Kosovo) Albin Krasniqi		(substituted on) 57'
Manager:
(Nigeria) Ndubuisi Egbo

Assistant referees:
- Granit Hyseni
- Arbnor Bullatofci

Fourth official:

- Ilir Mehmeti

Video assistant referee:

- Alban Shala

Assistant video assistant referee:

- Besnik Morina
Match rules
- 90 minutes
- 30 minutes of extra time if necessary
- Penalty shoot-out if scores still level
- Twelve named substitutes
- Maximum of five substitutions, with a sixth allowed in extra time

== Statistics ==
=== Top scorers ===
As of matches played on 22 May 2024

Rank	Player	Club	Goals
1	(Albania) Nazmi Gripshi	Ballkani	6
2	(Kosovo) Blendi Baftiu	Drita	3
2	(Kosovo) Drilon Hazrollaj	Malisheva	3
2	(Kosovo) Toni Salihu	Prishtina e Re	3
88 other players
