= 2022–23 Football Superleague of Kosovo =

Football Superleague of Kosovo
- Season: 2022–23
- Dates: 13 August 2022 – 28 May 2023
- Champions: Ballkani
- Relegated: Ferizaj; Trepça '89; Drenica
- Champions League: Ballkani
- Europa Conference League: Drita; Gjilani; Dukagjkni
- Matches: 180
- Goals: 446 (2.48 per match)
- Top goalscorer: Albion Rrahmani (21 goals)
- Biggest home win: Ballkani 7–2 Trepça '89 (23 April 2023)
- Biggest away win: Ferizaj 0–6 Malisheva (19 October 2022)
- Highest scoring: Ballkani 7–2 Trepça '89 (23 April 2023)
- All statistics correct as of 28 May 2023.

The 2022–23 Football Superleague of Kosovo season, also known as the ALBI MALL Superleague of Kosovo (Albanian: ALBI MALL Superliga e Kosovës) for sponsorship reasons with Albi Mall was the 24th (Note: This season was the 24th season under the name Football Superleague of Kosovo, the 30th season of top-tier football in Kosovo and the 76th season of football in Kosovo overall.) season of top-tier football in Kosovo. The season began on 13 August 2022 and ended on 28 May 2023. A total of ten teams are competing in the league: eight teams from the 2021–22 season and two teams from the 2021–22 First Football League of Kosovo. Ballkani are the defending champions from the previous season.

== Teams ==
Ten teаms will compete in the leаgue – the top eight teаms from the previous season and the two teams promoted from the Kosovo First League. The promoted teаms are Trepça '89 and Ferizaj. They will replаce Ulpiana and Feronikeli.

=== Stаdiums and locаtions ===
Locations of the 2022–23 Football Superleague of Kosovo teams

Note: Table lists in alphabetical order.

Club	Town	Stadium and capacity		UEFA license
Ballkani	Suva Reka	Suva Reka City Stadium	1,500	Yes
Drenica	Skenderaj	Bajram Aliu Stadium	3,000	No
Drita	Gjilan	Gjilan City Stadium (Note: The two teams, Drita and Gjilan, which use this stadium together with their fans, have named the stadium with different names. Drita and their fans named the stadium as Selami Osmani-Bezi Stadium, while Gjilan and their fans named the stadium as Agim Ramadani Stadium, but officially the stadium is named Gjilan City Stadium.)	15,000	Yes
Dukagjini	Klina	18 June Stadium	3,000	Yes
Ferizaj	Ferizaj	Ferizaj Synthetic Grass Stadium	1,500	No
Gjilani	Gjilan	Gjilan City Stadium	15,000	Yes
Llapi	Podujevo	Zahir Pajaziti Stadium	10,000	Yes
Malisheva	Mališevo	Liman Gegaj Stadium	2,000	Yes
Prishtina	Pristina	Fadil Vokrri Stadium	13,000	No
Trepça '89	Mitrovica	Riza Lushta Stadium	12,000	Yes

=== Personnel and kits ===
Team	Manager	Captain	Kit manufacturer	Shirt sponsor^{1}	
Ballkani	(Albania) Ilir Daja	(Kosovo) Arbër Potoku	(Germany) Uhlsport	(Kosovo) Cima Construction	
Drenica	(Albania) Bledar Devolli	(Kosovo) Shkëlzen Lushtaku	(Italy) Givova	(Kosovo) R&Rukolli	
Drita	(Greece) Akis Vavalis	(Kosovo) Ardian Limani	(Italy) Macron	(Switzerland) Rinora4	
Dukagjini	(Albania) Armend Dallku	(Kosovo) Altin Merlaku	(Italy) Macron		
Ferizaj	(Croatia) Andrej Panadić	(Kosovo) Florim Berisha	(Germany) MS SPORTS	(Kosovo) TERMOLULI	
Gjilani	(North Macedonia) Zekirija Ramadani	(Kosovo) Albert Dabiqaj	(Germany) Jako	(Kosovo) Tali SH.P.K	
Llapi	(Kosovo) Tahir Batatina	(Kosovo) Benjamin Emini	(Germany) MS SPORTS	(Kosovo) Berisha Group	
Malisheva	(Kosovo) Bylbyl Sokoli	(Kosovo) Dren Kryeziu	(Italy) Givova	(Kosovo) Patroni	
Prishtina	(Albania) Debatik Curri	(Kosovo) Gledi Mici	(Kosovo) Phoenix Sport	(Italy) (Kosovo) Rio Mare	
Trepça '89	(Kosovo) Shpëtim Idrizi	(Kosovo) Ardian Muja	(Kosovo) SHAFF	(Denmark) (Kosovo) JYSK Kosova	(United States) (Kosovo) KFC Kosova

1. On the front of shirt.

== League table ==
Pos	Team	Pld	W	D	L	GF	GA	GD	Pts	Qualification or relegation
1	Ballkani (C)	36	20	13	3	62	32	+30	73	Qualification for the Champions League first qualifying round
2	Drita	36	20	10	6	63	31	+32	70	Qualification for the Europa Conference League second qualifying round
3	Gjilani	36	13	15	8	34	34	0	54	Qualification for the Europa Conference League first qualifying round
4	Dukagjini	36	14	8	14	41	37	+4	50	Qualification for the Europa Conference League first qualifying round
5	Prishtina	36	12	12	12	46	36	+10	48	(Note: The 2022–23 Kosovar Cup winners, Prishtina, should've qualified for the Europa Conference League second qualifying round, however as they didn't have a UEFA license, 2nd place Drita got that spot and 4th place Dukagjini qualified for the Europa Conference League first qualifying round.)
6	Malisheva	36	12	10	14	52	52	0	46	
7	Llapi	36	11	10	15	44	50	−6	43	
8	Ferizaj (R)	36	10	11	15	31	50	−19	41	Qualification for the relegation play-offs
9	Trepça '89 (R)	36	10	10	16	46	62	−16	40	Relegation to First Football League of Kosovo
10	Drenica (R)	36	6	5	25	27	62	−35	23	Relegation to First Football League of Kosovo

Source: Football Federation of Kosovo (in Albanian)
Rules for classification: 1) Points; 2) Head-to-head points; 3) Head-to-head goal difference; 4) Goal difference; 5) Goals scored; 6) Play-offs (only if needed to decide champions, teams for relegation or teams for UEFA competitions).
(C) Champions; (R) Relegated

== Results ==
=== First half of season ===
Home \ Away	BAL	DRE	DRI	DUK	FER	GJI	LLA	MAL	PRI	T89
Ballkani	—	1–0	0–2	1–0	2–0	2–0	1–4	2–1	1–1	2–0
Drenica	1–1	—	1–3	0–1	0–0	0–0	0–1	0–0	2–1	2–5
Drita	2–2	2–1	—	1–0	1–0	4–1	4–0	3–1	1–2	3–1
Dukagjini	1–1	1–2	0–1	—	4–1	0–1	1–1	4–0	1–2	1–0
Ferizaj	0–3	1–1	1–1	0–0	—	1–1	2–1	0–6	0–0	2–3
Gjilani	0–3	0–2	1–1	1–0	3–2	—	0–1	1–0	1–1	3–1
Llapi	0–3	3–2	4–1	0–1	1–2	0–1	—	1–1	1–2	2–2
Malisheva	2–3	1–2	2–4	1–1	3–1	0–1	0–0	—	2–1	4–0
Prishtina	0–1	0–1	0–0	0–1	2–1	2–2	2–0	4–2	—	2–2
Trepça '89	1–1	1–0	2–2	3–0	1–1	1–1	3–3	2–3	0–3	—

Source: Soccerway
Legend: Blue = home team win; Yellow = draw; Red = away team win.
For upcoming matches, an "a" indicates there is an article about the rivalry between the two participants.

=== Second half of season ===
Home \ Away	BAL	DRE	DRI	DUK	FER	GJI	LLA	MAL	PRI	T89
Ballkani	—	2–1	1–1	1–1	2–0	2–0	1–0	2–2	1–1	7–2
Drenica	0–1	—	1–3	1–4	1–0	1–2	0–1	1–2	0–1	1–2
Drita	1–2	3–0	—	5–1	3–0	1–0	2–0	0–1	1–0	1–1
Dukagjini	1–1	2–0	0–0	—	3–1	0–1	0–1	1–0	1–0	3–1
Ferizaj	0–0	2–0	2–1	2–1	—	2–0	2–1	1–2	1–0	1–0
Gjilani	0–0	1–0	1–1	2–0	0–0	—	2–2	2–2	0–0	1–0
Llapi	3–2	4–0	0–2	1–1	0–0	2–2	—	1–0	0–2	2–1
Malisheva	2–4	3–1	0–0	1–2	1–1	0–2	3–2	—	1–1	1–0
Prishtina	2–2	4–1	1–2	1–2	2–0	0–0	0–0	1–2	—	4–1
Trepça '89	0–1	3–1	1–0	2–1	0–1	0–0	2–1	0–0	2–1	—

Source: Soccerway
Legend: Blue = home team win; Yellow = draw; Red = away team win.
For upcoming matches, an "a" indicates there is an article about the rivalry between the two participants.

=== Relegation play-offs ===
4 June 2023
15:00

Ferizaj	0–0	Liria Prizren
	Report
Penalties
Fazliu (penalty missed); Haxhimusa (penalty missed); Orana (penalty missed)	0–3	(penalty scored) Memaj; (penalty missed) Berisha; (penalty scored) Topallaj; (penalty scored) Jashari

Zahir Pajaziti Stadium, Podujevo, Kosovo
Referee: Visar Kastrati (Kosovo)

Liria Prizren were promoted to 2023–24 Football Superleague of Kosovo; Ferizaj were relegated to 2023–24 First Football League of Kosovo.

== Season statistics and awards ==
- First goal of the season: (Kosovo) Endrit Krasniqi for Prishtina against Dukagjini (13 August 2022).

=== Top scorers ===
As of 28 May 2023

#	Player	Club	Goals
1	(Kosovo) Albion Rrahmani	Ballkani	21
2	(Kosovo) Besnik Krasniqi	Drita	14
3	(North Macedonia) Marko Simonovski	Drita	12
4	(England) Ronald Sobowale	Malisheva	11
5	(Kosovo) Mevlan Zeka	Gjilani	10
5	(Nigeria) Christian Mba (Note: On 29 January 2023, Christian Mba was transferred from Trepça '89 to the Albanian Kategoria Superiore club Partizani Tirana.)	Trepça '89	10
6	(Nigeria) Otto John	Dukagjini	9
6	(Kosovo) Endrit Krasniqi	Prishtina	9
7	(Kosovo) Meriton Korenica	Ballkani	8
7	(Kosovo) Leotrim Kryeziu	Prishtina	8
8	(Kosovo) Ermal Krasniqi (Note: On 10 January 2023, Ermal Krasniqi was transferred from Ballkani to the Romanian Liga I club CFR Cluj.)	Ballkani	7

=== Top assisters ===
As of 28 May 2023

#	Player	Club	Assists
1	(Albania) Nazmi Gripshi	Ballkani	12
2	(Kosovo) Armend Thaqi	Ballkani	10
3	(Kosovo) Besnik Krasniqi	Drita	9
4	(Kosovo) Festim Alidema	Llapi	8
5	(Kosovo) Endrit Krasniqi	Prishtina	7
6	(Kosovo) Ilir Mustafa	Malisheva	6
7	(Kosovo) Almir Ajzeraj	Drita	5
7	(Kosovo) Kastriot Selmani	Drita	5
7	(Brazil) Elton Calé	Gjilani	5
7	(Kosovo) Bleart Tolaj	Malisheva	5
7	(Nigeria) Christian Mba	Trepça '89	5

=== Hat-tricks ===
Player	For	Against	Result	Date	Round
(North Macedonia) Marko Simonovski	Drita	Gjilani	4–1 (H)	14 September 2022	7
(Kosovo) Albion Rrahmani	Ballkani	Malisheva	4–2 (A)	11 February 2023	19

=== "Star of the Week" Award ===
Week	Player	Club	Ref	Week	Player	Club	Ref
1	(Nigeria) Christian Mba	Trepça '89		19	(Kosovo) Albion Rrahmani	Ballkani	
2	(Kosovo) Albion Pllana	Trepça '89		20	(Kosovo) Ilir Avdyli	Llapi	
3	(Kosovo) Bleart Tolaj	Malisheva		21	(Kosovo) Albion Rrahmani	Ballkani	
4	(Kosovo) Endrit Krasniqi	Prishtina		22	(Kosovo) Albin Krasniqi	Ferizaj	
5	(Kosovo) Alush Gavazaj	Malisheva		23	(Albania) Nazmi Gripshi	Ballkani	
6	(Nigeria) Christian Mba	Trepça '89		24	(Kosovo) Edon Sadriu	Ferizaj	
7	(North Macedonia) Marko Simonovski	Drita		25	(North Macedonia) Marko Jovanovski	Ferizaj	
8	(Republic of the Congo) Marly Prince Heritier	Trepça '89		26	(Kosovo) Ardian Muja	Trepça '89	
9	(Kosovo) Meriton Korenica	Ballkani		27	(Kosovo) Bujar Pllana	Prishtina	
10	(Kosovo) Arbnor Ramadani	Gjilani		28	(Kosovo) Kenan Haxhihamza	Dukagjini	
11	(Kosovo) Armend Thaqi	Ballkani		29	(Kosovo) Arbnor Ramadani	Gjilani	
12	(Kosovo) Ermal Krasniqi	Ballkani		30	(England) Ronald Sobowale	Malisheva	
13	(Kosovo) Endrit Krasniqi	Prishtina		31	(Ukraine) Vladyslav Khomutov	Dukagjini	
14	(Kosovo) Festim Alidema	Llapi		32	(Kosovo) Blendi Baftiu	Drita	
15	(Kosovo) Albert Dabiqaj	Gjilani		33	(Kosovo) Lumbardh Dellova	Ballkani	
16	(Mexico) Francisco Rivera	Llapi		34	(Kosovo) Mevlan Zeka	Gjilani	
17	(Albania) Enea Koliçi	Gjilani		35	(Montenegro) Edvin Kuč	Ballkani	
18	(Kosovo) Ermal Krasniqi	Ballkani		36	(Kosovo) Flamur Gashi	Malisheva	

== Attendances ==
#	Football club	Home games	Average attendance
1	KF Llapi	18	1,483
2	FC Prishtina	18	1,413
3	FC Ballkani	18	1,037
4	FC Ferizaj	18	1,079
5	KF Drenica	18	592
6	KF Dukagjini	18	587
7	KF Malisheva	18	450
8	KF Trepça '89	18	419
9	FC Drita	18	409
10	SC Gjilani	18	380

== Notes and references ==
=== References ===
"Star of the Week" Award
