= Meriton Korenica =

Kosovan footballer (born 1996)

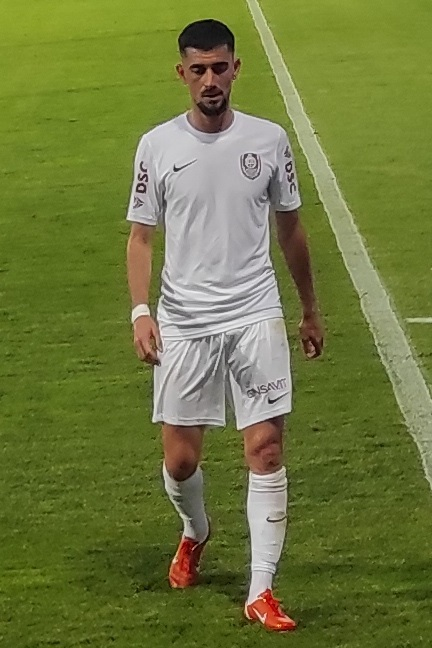
- Korenica with CFR Cluj in 2025

Personal information
- Date of birth: 15 December 1996 (age 29)
- Place of birth: Rahovec, FR Yugoslavia
- Height: 1.75 m (5 ft 9 in)
- Position: Winger

Team information
- Current team: FCSB
- Number: 7

Youth career
- –2015: Rahoveci
- 2015: Shkëndija

Senior career*
Years	Team	Apps	(Gls)
2015–2016	Shkëndija	1	(0)
2016	→ Metalurg Skopje (loan)	8	(0)
2016–2018	Liria Prizren	23	(2)
2018–2020	Prishtina	51	(20)
2020–2023	Ballkani	95	(14)
2023–2024	Manisa	10	(0)
2024	→ Ballkani (loan)	18	(1)
2024–2026	CFR Cluj	83	(18)
2026–	FCSB	8	(1)

International career^{‡}
2017–2018	Kosovo U21	4	(0)
2023–	Kosovo	7	(0)
- * Club domestic league appearances and goals as of 7 November 2026 ‡ National team caps and goals as of 4 October 2026

Meriton Korenica (born 15 December 1996) is a Kosovan professional footballer who plays as a winger for Liga I club FCSB and the Kosovo national team.

== Club career ==
=== Early career ===
Korenica began his youth career at Rahoveci. In 2015, he joined the youth setup of Shkëndija, one of Macedonia's top clubs, and progressed quickly to the senior team. He made his professional debut during the 2015–16 season, appearing once for Shkëndija's first team. In 2016, he was sent on loan to Metalurg Skopje to gain more first-team experience, making eight appearances during his spell.

Later that year, he returned to Kosovo and signed with Liria Prizren, where he played until 2018, making 23 appearances and scoring his first two professional goals. His time at Liria marked an important stage in his development, helping him establish himself as a reliable senior-level player.

=== Ballkani ===
In 2020, Korenica joined FC Ballkani. During his time at the club, Ballkani won the Kosovo Superleague three consecutive times (2021–22, 2022–23, 2023–24), as well as the Kosovar Cup (2023–24) and Kosovar Supercup (2022). Korenica was a regular starter and contributed with both goals and assists.

=== Manisa ===
On 3 September 2023, Korenica signed a two-year contract with TFF First League club Manisa with an option for a further year, and received squad number 77. Manisa reportedly paid a €200,000 transfer fee. His debut with Manisa came fourteen days later against Giresunspor after coming on as a substitute at 57th minute in place of Kerim Frei.

==== Return to Ballkani as loan ====
On 29 January 2024, Korenica returned to Kosovo Superleague side Ballkani, on loan for the remainder of the 2023–24 season.

=== CFR Cluj ===
On 9 July 2024, Korenica transferred to CFR Cluj in Romania's Liga I. In the 2024–25 season, he made 39 league appearances, scored 9 goals, and provided 6 assists. He helped the club win the Cupa României and was awarded CFR Cluj's Player of the Month twice. He was later named to the Liga I Team of the Season.

== International career ==
Korenica represented Kosovo U21 at 2019 UEFA European Under-21 Championship qualifications and played in four matches as a substitute. On 22 January 2018, he received a call-up from Kosovo for the friendly match against Azerbaijan. The match however was cancelled two days later, which prolonged his debut.

On 31 August 2023, Korenica received again a call-up from Kosovo for the UEFA Euro 2024 qualifying matches against Switzerland and Romania. His debut with Kosovo came nine days later in the UEFA Euro 2024 qualifying match against Switzerland after coming on as a substitute in the 81st minute in place of Milot Rashica, and assists in his side's second goal during a 2–2 home draw.

== Career statistics ==
=== Club ===
As of match played 7 November 2026

Appearances and goals by club, season and competition
Club	Season	League			National cup (Note: Includes Kosovar Cup, Turkish Cup, Cupa României)		Europe		Other		Total	
Club	Season	Division	Apps	Goals	Apps	Goals	Apps	Goals	Apps	Goals	Apps	Goals
Shkëndija	2015–16	1. MFL	1	0	—		—		—		1	0
Metalurg Skopje (loan)	2015–16	1. MFL	8	0	—		—		—		8	0
Liria Prizren	2016–17	Superleague of Kosovo	5	1	0	0	—		—		5	1
Liria Prizren	2017–18	Superleague of Kosovo	18	1	0	0	—		—		18	1
Liria Prizren	Total		23	2	0	0	—		—		23	2
Prishtina	2018–19	Superleague of Kosovo	26	11	1	1	4 (Note: Appearances in UEFA Europa League)	1	0	0	31	13
Prishtina	2019–20	Superleague of Kosovo	25	9	4	3	2	0	—		31	12
Prishtina	Total		51	20	5	4	6	1	0	0	62	25
Ballkani	2020–21	Superleague of Kosovo	30	3	2	0	—		—		32	3
Ballkani	2021–22	Superleague of Kosovo	31	3	1	0	—		—		32	3
Ballkani	2022–23	Superleague of Kosovo	33	8	1	0	14 (Note: Two appearances in UEFA Champions League, twelve appearances and six goals in UEFA Conference League)	6	1 (Note: Appearance in Kosovar Supercup)	0	49	14
Ballkani	2023–24	Superleague of Kosovo	1	0	—		8 (Note: Two appearances and one goal in UEFA Champions League, six appearances and two goals in UEFA Conference League)	3	—		10	3
Ballkani	Total		95	14	4	0	22	9	1	0	122	23
Manisa	2023–24	TFF 1. Lig	10	0	1	1	—		—		11	1
Ballkani (loan)	2023–24	Superleague of Kosovo	18	1	3	1	—		—		21	2
CFR Cluj	2024–25	Liga I	39	9	5	1	6 (Note: Appearances in UEFA Conference League)	2	—		50	12
CFR Cluj	2025–26	Liga I	39	9	4	2	7 (Note: Six appearances in UEFA Europa League, one appearance and one goal in UEFA Conference League)	1	0	0	50	12
CFR Cluj	2026–27	Liga I	5	0	1	1	4	2	—		10	3
CFR Cluj	Total		83	18	10	4	17	5	0	0	110	27
FCSB	2026–27	Liga I	8	1	1	0	—		—		9	1
Career total			297	56	24	10	45	15	1	0	367	81

=== International ===
As of match played 4 October 2026

Appearances and goals by national team and year
National team	Year	Apps	Goals
Kosovo
Kosovo	2023	5	0
Kosovo	2024	0	0
Kosovo	2025	1	0
Kosovo	2026	1	0
Total		7	0

== Honours ==
Prishtina

- Kosovar Cup: 2019–20
- Kosovar Supercup runner-up: 2018

Ballkani

- Superleague of Kosovo: 2021–22, 2022–23, 2023–24
- Kosovar Cup: 2023–24
- Kosovar Supercup: 2022

CFR Cluj

- Cupa României: 2024–25
- Supercupa României runner-up: 2025

Individual

- Superleague of Kosovo "Star of the Week" Award: 2022–23 (Round 9)
- Liga I Team of the Season: 2024–25, 2025–26
- CFR Cluj – Player of the Month: Awarded twice during the 2024–25 season
