= Armend Thaqi =

Kosovan footballer (born 1992)

Personal information
- Full name: Armend Qazim Thaqi
- Date of birth: 10 October 1992 (age 34)
- Place of birth: Pristina, FR Yugoslavia
- Height: 1.79 m (5 ft 10 in)
- Position: Right-back

Team information
- Current team: Gjilani
- Number: 2

Youth career
- 2003–2011: KEK
- 2011–2013: Hajvalia

Senior career*
Years	Team	Apps	(Gls)
2013–2016	Prishtina	+29	(+1)
2016–2018	Gjilani	46	(3)
2018–2020	Prishtina	69	(10)
2020–2024	Ballkani	136	(11)
2024	CFR Cluj	4	(0)
2024–	Gjilani	77	(19)

International career^{‡}
2013	Kosovo U21	2	(0)
2017–	Kosovo	5	(0)
- * Club domestic league appearances and goals as of 2 November 2026 ‡ National team caps and goals as of 19 December 2025

Armend Qazim Thaqi (also spelled Thaçi; born 10 October 1992) is a Kosovan professional footballer who plays as a right-back for Kosovo Superleague club Gjilani.

== Club career ==
=== Prishtina ===
On 22 June 2013, Thaqi signed a three-year contract with Kosovo Superleague club Prishtina.

=== Gjilani ===
On 13 July 2016, Thaqi signed a one-year contract with Kosovo Superleague club Gjilani.

=== Return to Prishtina ===
On 31 May 2018, Thaqi signed a two-year contract with Kosovo Superleague club Prishtina. His debut with Prishtina came on 11 July in first qualifying round of UEFA Europa League against Luxembourgish side Fola Esch. Thaqi was also named to the Football Superleague of Kosovo Team of the Year in 2018.

=== Ballkani ===
On 25 August 2020, Thaqi signed a two-year contract with Kosovo Superleague club Ballkani.

== International career ==
=== Under-21 ===
In June 2013, Thaqi was named as part of the Kosovo U21 squad for 2013 Valais Youth Cup. On 12 June 2013, he made his debut with Kosovo U21 in 2013 Valais Youth Cup semi-final against Ghana U20 after being named in the starting line-up.

=== Senior ===
On 8 November 2017, Thaqi received a call-up from Kosovo for the friendly match against Latvia, and made his debut after coming on as a substitute at 83rd minute in place of Fidan Aliti.

== Career statistics ==
=== International ===
As of match played 11 June 2021

Appearances and goals by national team and year
National team	Year	Apps	Goals
Kosovo
Kosovo	2017	1	0
Kosovo	2020	1	0
Kosovo	2021	2	0
Total		5	0

== Honours ==
Prishtina

- Kosovar Cup: 2015–16, 2019–2016

Ballkani

- Kosovo Superleague: 2021–22, 2022–23, 2023–24
- Kosovar Cup: 2023–24
- Kosovar Supercup: 2022, 2023
