= Albin Berisha =

Kosovan footballer (born 2001)

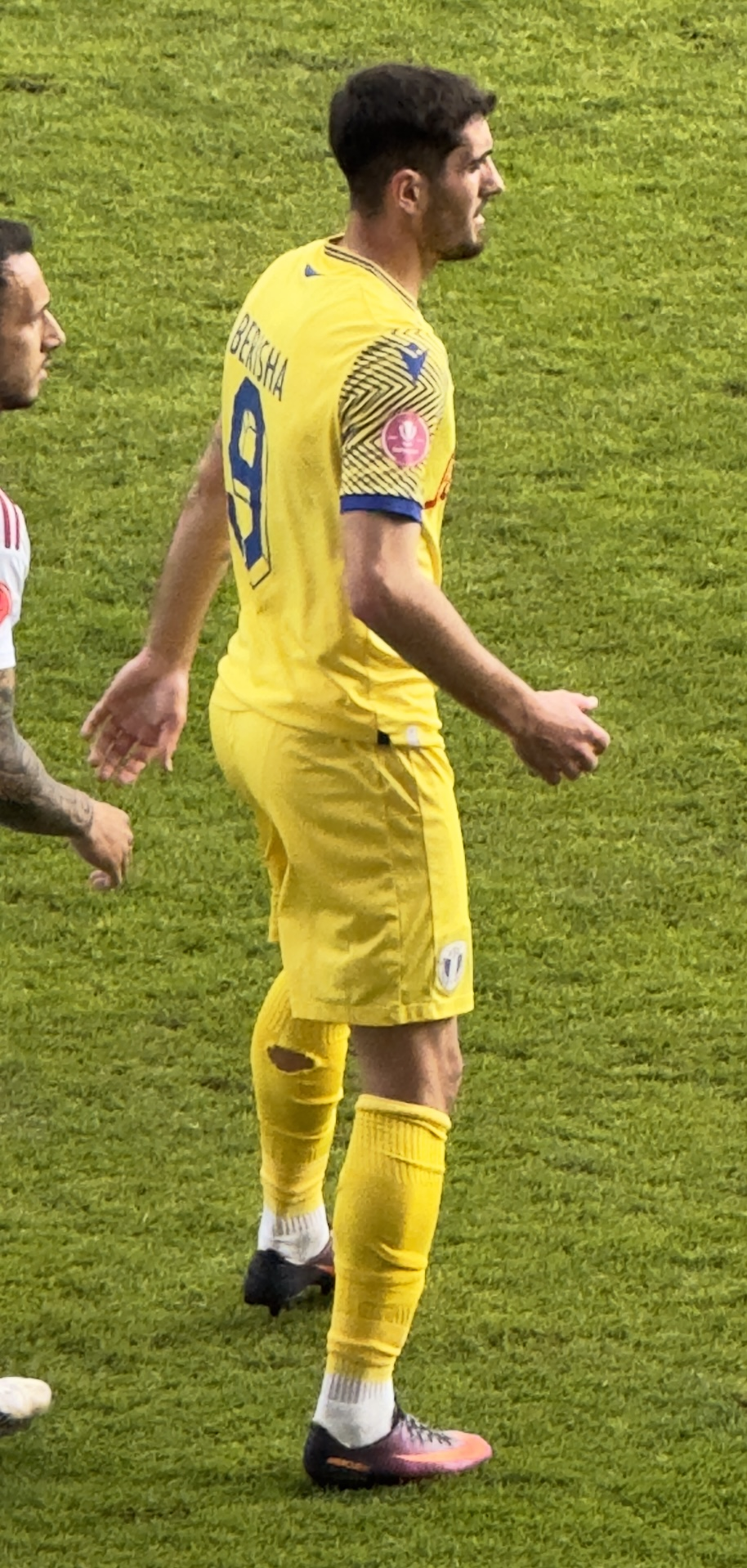
- Berisha with Petrolul Ploiești in 2024

Personal information
- Date of birth: 14 January 2001 (age 25)
- Place of birth: Gjinoc, Kosovo under UN administration
- Height: 1.89 m (6 ft 2 in)
- Position: Forward

Team information
- Current team: Ballkani
- Number: 99

Youth career
- –2017: Ballkani
- 2017–2018: Kukësi
- 2018–2019: Laçi

Senior career*
Years	Team	Apps	(Gls)
2018	Kukësi	0	(0)
2018–2019	Laçi	0	(0)
2019	Besa Pejë		
2019–2024	Ballkani	45	(11)
2020–2021	→ Liria Prizren (loan)		
2022	→ Malisheva (loan)	9	(3)
2024	Petrolul Ploiești	17	(4)
2024–2026	Hansa Rostock	4	(0)
2026	Kapfenberger SV	5	(0)
2026–	Ballkani	11	(5)
- * Club domestic league appearances and goals as of 31 October 2026

Albin Berisha (born 14 January 2001) is a Kosovan professional footballer who plays as a forward for Ballkani.

Berisha began his senior career at Kategoria Superiore clubs Kukësi and Laçi, before returning to his native Kosovo at Besa Pejë in 2019. In the summer of that year, he moved to Kosovo Superleague club Ballkani, with which he won several domestic honours following loans at Liria Prizren and Malisheva. In 2024, he signed for Romanian team Petrolul Ploiești.

== Club career ==
=== Early career and Albania ===
Berisha started his junior career at his hometown club Ballkani, from where he was transferred to Albanian side Kukësi in 2017. He was initially assigned to the under-17 and under-19 teams, and on 6 February 2018 was promoted to the first team. On 10 March that year, he was named as a substitute for the first time in a Kategoria Superiore match against Teuta Durrës.

Berisha then moved to fellow league team Laçi in the summer of 2018. He made his debut on 26 September, starting and scoring two goals in a 9–0 home rout of Naftëtari in the first round of the Albanian Cup. Midway through the 2018–19 campaign, Berisha returned to his native Kosovo by signing for Besa Pejë, recently relegated to the second division.

=== Ballkani ===
On 28 July 2019, Berisha rejoined his former youth side Ballkani in the Kosovo Superleague.

==== Loan to Liria Prizren and first return from loan ====
Following his debut season, Berisha was sent on a one-year loan to Liria Prizren on 7 September 2020. On 21 August 2021, he returned from his loan and extended his contract until 2025. Berisha played his first match after his return a day later against Dukagjini, coming on as a 61st-minute substitute for Ermal Krasniqi.

==== Loan to Malisheva ====
Berisha played for Ballkani during the first half of the 2021–22 campaign, but moved on loan to fellow league team Malisheva on 1 February 2022. He made his debut 12 days later against Prishtina, being named in the starting lineup.

==== Second return from loan ====
On 5 July 2022, Berisha registered his debut in European competitions by starting in a 1–1 home draw to Žalgiris in the first qualifying round of the UEFA Champions League. On 19 July, he scored his first European goal in a 4–0 away thrashing of La Fiorita in the second qualifying round of the Europa Conference League.

Berisha made six appearances in the group stage of the latter competition, but only started in a 0–1 away loss to CFR Cluj on 3 November. On 21 January 2023, he started in the 1–0 victory over Llapi in the 2022 Kosovar Supercup.

Berisha won his second national title with Ballkani at the end of the 2022–23 season. His side qualified again to the Europa Conference League, and this time he started in all six matches of the group stage, including the 2–0 home win over Dinamo Zagreb on 5 October 2023.

=== Petrolul Ploiești ===
On 5 February 2024, Berisha signed a three-and-a-half-year contract with Romanian club Petrolul Ploiești, for a rumoured fee of €200,000 plus 20% interest on a future sale. He made his debut eleven days later, scoring a late winner in a 2–1 home Liga I victory over Politehnica Iași.

On 29 July 2024, Berisha scored his first goal of the season in a 1–0 league derby win over Rapid București.

=== Hansa Rostock ===
On 14 August 2024, Berisha moved to German side Hansa Rostock for an undisclosed transfer fee. He scored a goal in his very first game for Hansa, in the cup match against Hertha BSC (1–5). After that, he only made three more appearances for the North-German club until the winter break.

On 6 February 2026, his contract with Hansa was mutually terminated.

=== Return to Ballkani ===
After playing a few months for Kapfenberger SV in the Austrian Second League, he returned to Kosovo on 6 June 2026 signing again for Ballkani.

== International career ==
In 2019, Berisha was called up by the Kosovo national under-19 team for a training camp held between 7 and 9 May. On the 20th that month, he received another call-up for the friendlies against Albania, but was an unused substitute in both matches.

== Honours ==
Ballkani

- Kosovo Superleague: 2021–22, 2022–23, 2023–24
- Kosovar Cup runner-up: 2019–20
- Kosovar Supercup: 2022

Hansa Rostock

- Mecklenburg-Vorpommern Cup: 2024–25
