= Arbër Potoku =

Kosovan footballer

Personal information
- Full name: Arbër Potoku
- Date of birth: 19 April 1994 (age 32)
- Place of birth: Mitrovicë, FR Yugoslavia (modern Kosovo)
- Height: 1.74 m (5 ft 9 in)
- Position: Left-back

Team information
- Current team: Gjilani
- Number: 3

Senior career*
Years	Team	Apps	(Gls)
2015–2018	Trepça '89	26	(1)
2018–2026	Ballkani	218	(6)
2019	→ Feronikeli (loan)	0	(0)
2026–	Gjilani	7	(1)
- * Club domestic league appearances and goals as of 22 June 2026 ‡ National team caps and goals as of 15 September 2023

Arbër Potoku (born 19 April 1994) is a Kosovan professional footballer who plays as a left-back for Kosovan club Gjilani.

== Honours ==
Trepça '89

- Kosovar Superliga
  - Winners (1): 2017

Ballkani

- Kosovo Superleague
- Winners (3): 2021–22, 2022–23, 2023–24
- Kosovar Supercup
- Winner (1) 2022
