= Christian Mba =

Nigerian professional footballer (born 1999)

Personal information
- Date of birth: 12 October 1999 (age 27)
- Place of birth: Asaba, Nigeria
- Height: 1.90 m (6 ft 3 in)
- Position: Forward

Team information
- Current team: Chornomorets Odesa (on a loan from FC Kharkiv)
- Number: 99

Senior career*
Years	Team	Apps	(Gls)
2022–2023	Trepça '89	18	(10)
2023–2025	Partizani Tirana	63	(15)
2025–2026	Kharkiv	33	(4)
2026–	→ Chornomorets Odesa (loan)	1	(0)
- * Club domestic league appearances and goals

Christian Mba (born 12 October 1999) is a Nigerian professional footballer who plays as a forward for Ukrainian club Chornomorets Odesa.

Mba appeared in the European football in the beginning of 2022, when as 22-year-old he arrived from Nigeria to join Kosovar side Trepça '89. During the 2022–23 Football Superleague of Kosovo, he was recognized as the most valuable player of the week (Star of the Week) on a couple of occasions. And although he only played a half of the 2022–23 season, Mba placed fifth on the league's top scorers list, sharing it with Mevlan Zeka. During a winter break in January 2023, he moved to FK Partizani Tirana playing in a "sister" competition 2022–23 Kategoria Superiore of the neighboring Albania. That season, Partizani Tirana became the Albanian champions.

On 11 July 2023, Mba made his first appearance in the UEFA Champions League, when Partizani was hosting Belarusian BATE.

A couple of seasons later, on 11 January 2025, Partizani announced about selling of Mba to Ukrainian side Kharkiv (at that time Metalist 1925).

In September 2026, FC Chornomorets Odesa loaned Christian from Kharkiv.
