= Alban Shillova =

Kosovan footballer

Personal information
- Date of birth: 13 August 1992 (age 34)
- Place of birth: Zllatar, Pristina, FR Yugoslavia
- Height: 1.88 m (6 ft 2 in)
- Position: Centre-forward

Team information
- Current team: Prishtina
- Number: 17

Youth career
- SH.F. Vigani

Senior career*
Years	Team	Apps	(Gls)
–2013	Fushë Kosova		(1)
2014	Bylis	6	(0)
2014–2015	Trepça		
2015–2016	Drita	29	(8)
2016–2017	Liria Prizren	3	(1)
2017	Drita	9	(1)
2017–2018	Vllaznia Pozheran	3	(1)
2018–2019	Flamurtari	42	(14)
2019–2020	Prishtina	22	(4)
2020	→ Drenica (loan)	12	(8)
2021–2022	Llapi	24	(2)
2022–2023	Malisheva	23	(5)
2023–2025	Feronikeli	37	(4)
2025–	Prishtina	12	(0)
- * Club domestic league appearances and goals as of 28 May 2025

Alban Shillova (born 13 August 1992) is a Kosovar professional footballer who plays as a Centre-forward for Prishtina.

== Career ==
=== Bylis (2014) ===
In 2014, Shillova joined the Kategoria Superiore club Bylis. His debut with Bylis came on 16 February 2014 in a home loss against Tirana.

=== Prishtina (2019–2020) ===
On June 15, 2019, Shillova signed for Prishtina of the Football Superleague of Kosovo.

=== Llapi (2021–2022) ===
On June 18, 2021, Shillova signed for Llapi of the Football Superleague of Kosovo. He made his debut on the 21 August 2021 against Ulpiana.

== Honours ==
Prishtina

- Kosovo Superleague: 2020–21
- Kosovar Cup: 2024–25

Llapi

- Kosovar Cup: 2021–22
- Kosovar Supercup: 2021
