= Drilon Islami =

Kosovan association football player (born 2000)

Personal information
- Date of birth: 18 July 2000 (age 26)
- Place of birth: Ferizaj, Kosovo under UN administration
- Height: 1.77 m (5 ft 10 in)
- Position: Defensive midfielder

Team information
- Current team: Shkëndija
- Number: 5

Youth career
- –2019: Ferizaj

Senior career*
Years	Team	Apps	(Gls)
2019–2023	Drita	43	(1)
2023	Ferizaj	15	(0)
2023–2025	Prishtina	62	(3)
2025–2026	CFR Cluj	0	(0)
2026–	Shkëndija	16	(1)
- * Club domestic league appearances and goals as of 18 June 2026

Drilon Islami (born 18 July 2000) is a Kosovan professional footballer who plays as a defensive midfielder for Macedonian First League club Shkëndija.

== Club career ==
=== Return to Ferizaj ===
On 16 January 2023, Islami signed a one-and-a-half-year contract with Kosovo Superleague club Ferizaj. His debut with Ferizaj came on 11 February against Gjilani after being named in the starting line-up.

=== Prishtina ===
On 13 June 2023, Islami joined Kosovo Superleague side Prishtina. His debut with Prishtina came two month later against Feronikeli after being named in the starting line-up.

=== CFR Cluj ===
On 2 June 2025, Islami joined Romanian Liga I side CFR Cluj.

== Honours ==
Drita

- Kosovo Superleague: 2019–20
- Kosovar Supercup runner-up: 2020

Prishtina

- Kosovar Cup: 2024–25
- Kosovar Supercup: 2023

Individual

- Kosovo Superleague "Star of the Week" Award: 2023–24 (Round 27)
