= Ilir Daja =

Albanian football manager (born 1966)

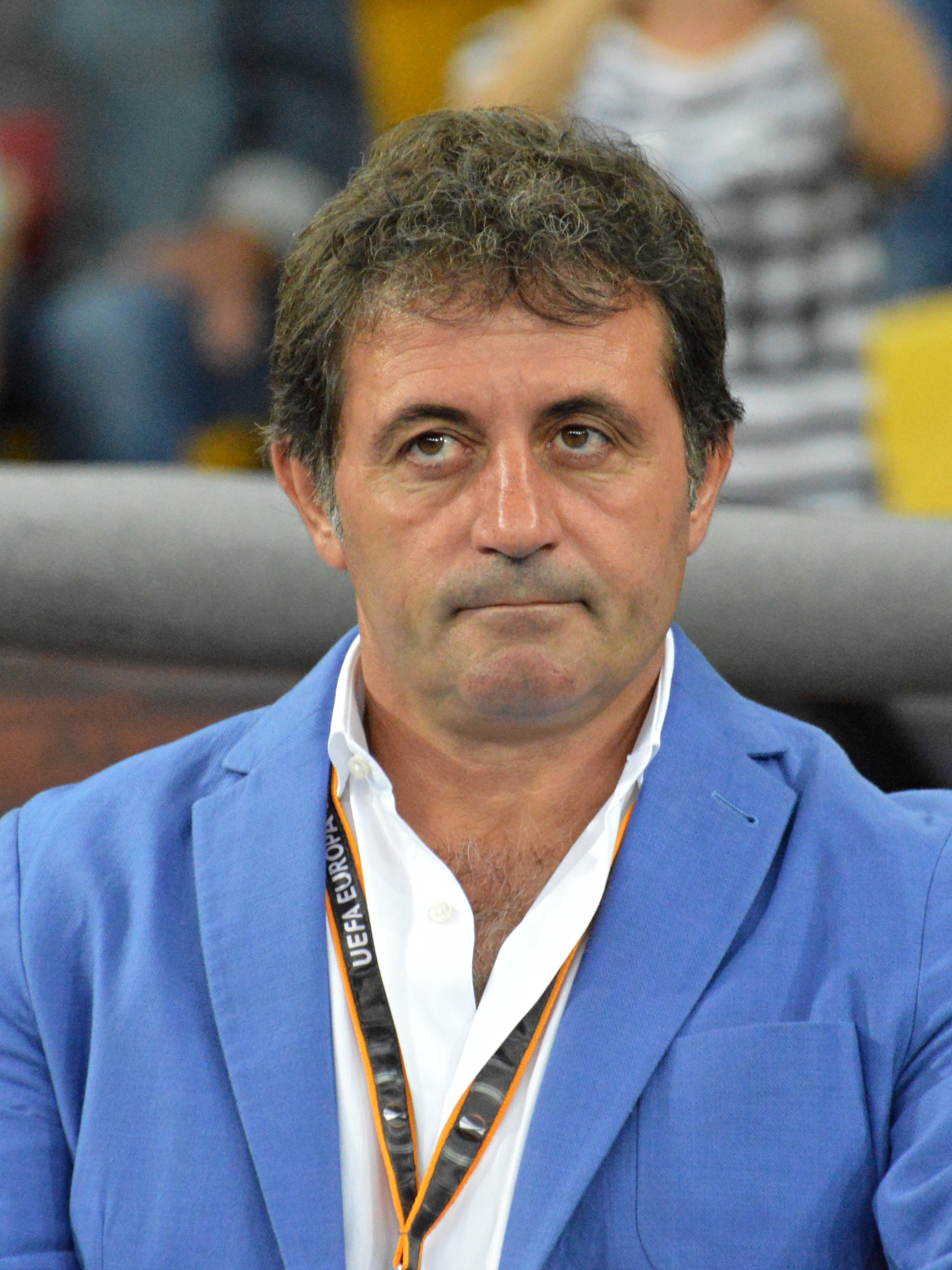
- Daja in 2017

Personal information
- Full name: Ilir Daja
- Date of birth: 20 October 1966 (age 60)
- Place of birth: Tirana, PR Albania
- Position: Midfielder

Team information
- Current team: Dinamo City (manager)

Youth career
- 1974–1980: 17 Nëntori
- 1980–1987: Dinamo Tirana

Senior career*
Years	Team	Apps	(Gls)
1987–1988	Besa		
1988–1991	Dinamo Tirana		

Managerial career
- 2004–2005: Pogradeci
- 2005–2006: Elbasani
- 2007–2008: Dinamo Tirana
- 2008–2009: Besa Kavajë
- 2011: Dinamo Tirana
- 2012: Besa
- 2015–2016: Tirana
- 2017–2018: Skënderbeu
- 2018–2019: Flamurtari
- 2019–2020: Skënderbeu
- 2020–2021: Partizani
- 2022–2024: Ballkani
- 2024–: Dinamo City
- * Club domestic league appearances and goals

Ilir Daja (born 20 October 1966) is an Albanian professional football manager and former player. He is the current manager of Dinamo City. He has won the Albanian League as a coach with three clubs: Elbasani, Dinamo Tirana and Skënderbeu. He also won the Kosovo Superleague three times with FC Ballkani and lead them to qualification for the group stage of UEFA Europa Conference League in 2022–23 and 2023–24.

== Club career ==
Daja spent his youth career with 17 Nëntori, before playing for Dinamo Tirana for ten years. In 1989, in Dinamo's European Champion Clubs' Cup clash against Dinamo București, Daja suffered a major knee injury that forced him to go on surgery several times.

== Managerial career ==
Daja started his managerial career in 2005 with Elbasani whom he stayed until 2007, helping the club to win the Kategoria Superiore in 2005–06 season. Then he signed with Dinamo Tirana two seasons later to prevail again in this competition.

=== Tirana ===
In October 2015, Daja begun negotiations with Tirana and on 28th, Daja signed a contract until the end of the season. He was presented to the media the next day. Tirana defeated Kukësi 2–1 at home in Daja's first match in charge, returning in winning ways after three league matches. On 1 November 2016, following the goalless draw against Vllaznia, Daja was released from his contract by club president Refik Halili.

=== Skënderbeu ===
On 3 January 2017, Daja was hired as the new coach of Skënderbeu hours after the departure of Andrea Agostinelli, who was released from the club. He was introduced the next day, declaring that if the team didn't win the league, it would be a big failure.

In the summer of 2017, Daja guided the team in the 2017–18 UEFA Europa League qualifying rounds, being the mastermind as Skënderbeu achieved group stage for the second time ever and also become the first Albanian club to pass four rounds. They easily won in the first qualifying round versus amateur side Sant Julià, progressing to the next round 6–0 on aggregate. In the second round, Skënderbeu managed a 1–1 draw versus Kairat at Almaty Central Stadium for the first leg; despite being down in the first ten minutes after a Gerard Gohou, the team pushed for an equalizer and got it thanks to a Bakary Nimaga tap-in. In the second leg, Daja's team won 2–0 to progress to next round 3–1 on aggregate; his decision to play Sebino Plaku for James Adeniyi resulted a success as the striker scored the second goal with a lob.

In the first match of third round versus Mladá Boleslav, Skënderbeu lost 2–1 after a late goal scored by the opposition, only one minute after Skënderbeu's equalizer. In the second match, Daja's side won with the same score, which led the match to penalty shootouts where his side was more precise as they won 4–2 to reach the play-off for the third time in history. In the play-off round, the team played Dinamo Zagreb; they earned a 1–1 draw at Stadion Maksimir despite being on lead until the injury time, before holding on to a goalless draw in the returning leg to group stage on away goal rule.

On 9 May 2018, Skënderbeu was confirmed as Kategoria Superiore champion following a 4–2 win at Lushnja and Kukësi's 3–2 away defeat to Teuta. Later on 27 May, he led to team to the Albanian Cup success, by defeating 1–0 Laçi in the final for their first ever Albanian Cup title. Skënderbeu thus completed the domestic double for the first time in history. Daja also become the first manager since Sulejman Mema in 1999 to achieve this feat.

On 19 June 2018, after Court of Arbitration for Sport upheld UEFA's decision to exclude Skënderbeu from UEFA competitions for the next 10 years, Daja announced his departure from the club.

=== Ballkani ===
Daja was appointed as manager of Kosovo Superleague club FC Ballkani on 5 January 2022. He won three league titles, one Kosovar Cup and one Kosovar Supercup in his three seasons in the club. He also guided the team to the group stage of UEFA Conference League in 2022-23 and 2023-24. In doing so, Ballkani became the first team from Kosovo to qualify for the final stage of a UEFA club competition. Daja resigned from his post on 2 September 2024 after the team failed to qualify for a European competition for the third time in a row. His last game was a league defeat against KF Malisheva away.

=== Dinamo City ===
On 11 September 2024, Daja was appointed as new manager of FC Dinamo City, the club formerly known as Dinamo Tirana. He had previously played for the club and had also been their manager in two different spells. When he took over, Dinamo had played three games in the 2024-25 Kategoria Superiore, winning one and losing two. His first game was a 2-2 away draw in a local derby against his former club FK Partizani Tirana on 12 September 2024. The season finished with Dinamo achieving the fourth position of the league and winning the 2024-25 Albanian Cup, the first title for the club since 2010.

In the 2025–26 UEFA Conference League qualifying, Dinamo defeated Atlètic Escaldes in the second round before knocking out croatian giants Hajduk Split in the third. They were eliminated from the competition in the play-off round by Polish side Jagiellonia Bialystok.

On 28 December 2025, Dinamo won the 2025 Albanian Supercup defeating Egnatia 3-1 in the Air Albania Stadium.

On 13 May 2026, Dinamo won the Albanian Cup for the second year in a row after defeating Egnatia in the 2025-26 Albanian Cup final.

In the 2026–27 UEFA Conference League qualifying rounds, Dinamo knocked out Astana, NK Aluminij and FK Auda before losing against Pafos in the extra time of the play-off round.

== Managerial statistics ==
As of 9 November 2026

Team	From	To	Record					
Team	From	To	G	W	D	L	Win %	Ref.
Tirana	28 October 2015	1 November 2016	37	16	14	7	43.24	
Skënderbeu	3 January 2017	19 June 2018	79	47	16	16	59.49	
Flamurtari	19 June 2018	30 June 2019	40	18	9	13	45.00	
Skënderbeu	8 August 2019	9 August 2020	41	20	8	13	48.78	
Partizani	10 August 2020	27 December 2021	61	29	19	13	47.54	
Ballkani	5 January 2022	2 September 2024	135	81	28	26	60.00	
Dinamo City	11 September 2024	Present	113	46	35	32	40.71	
Total			506	257	129	120	50.79	—

== Honours ==
=== Player ===
- Kategoria Superiore: 1

1990

=== Manager ===
Elbasani

- Kategoria Superiore: 2005–06

Dinamo Tirana/City

- Kategoria Superiore: 2007–08
- Albanian Cup: 2024–25, 2025–26
- Albanian Supercup: 2025

Skënderbeu

- Kategoria Superiore: 2017–18
- Albanian Cup: 2017–18

Ballkani

- Superleague of Kosovo: 2021–22, 2022–23, 2023–24
- Kosovar Cup: 2023–24
- Kosovar Supercup: 2022, 2024
