= Qëndrim Zyba =

Kosovan footballer (born 2001)

Personal information
- Date of birth: 3 February 2001 (age 25)
- Place of birth: Suva Reka, Kosovo under UN administration
- Height: 1.84 m (6 ft 0 in)
- Position: Midfielder

Team information
- Current team: Slovan Liberec
- Number: 34

Youth career
- –2017: Ballkani
- 2017–2019: Prishtina

Senior career*
Years	Team	Apps	(Gls)
2019–2022	Prishtina	56	(2)
2022–2024	Ballkani	44	(4)
2024	→ Legia Warsaw (loan)	6	(0)
2024	→ Legia Warsaw II (loan)	3	(1)
2024–	Slovan Liberec	20	(3)

International career^{‡}
2017	Kosovo U17	5	(1)
2019	Kosovo U19	3	(0)
2021–2022	Kosovo U21	7	(0)
2023–	Kosovo	4	(0)
- * Club domestic league appearances and goals as of 17 June 2025 ‡ National team caps and goals as of 21 November 2023

Qëndrim Zyba (born 3 February 2001) is a Kosovan professional footballer who plays as a midfielder for Czech First League club Slovan Liberec and the Kosovo national team.

== Club career ==
=== Prishtina ===
On 1 November 2017, Zyba signed his first professional contract with Kosovo Superleague side Prishtina after agreeing to a three-year deal with the possibility of extension for another two years, even though he signed the professional contract with the senior team most of the time he was part of the U17 and later U19 teams. His debut with Prishtina came on 27 June 2019 in the 2019–20 UEFA Europa League preliminary round against St Joseph's after coming on as a substitute in the 78th minute in place of Ergyn Ahmeti.

=== Ballkani ===
On 6 June 2022, Zyba returned to Kosovo Superleague side Ballkani after agreeing to a three-year deal. His debut with Ballkani came a month later in the 2022–23 UEFA Champions League first qualifying round against Žalgiris after coming on as a substitute in the 72nd minute in place of Nazmi Gripshi.

=== Legia Warsaw ===
On 2 February 2024, Zyba was loaned to Polish Ekstraklasa club Legia Warsaw for six months, with a preemptive option to buy for another two-and-a-half years. On the eve of the last matchday of the 2023–24 season, Legia announced Zyba would return to Ballkani at the conclusion of his loan.

=== Slovan Liberec ===
On 10 July 2024, Zyba signed a contract with Slovan Liberec until 2027.

== International career ==
From 2017 until 2022, Zyba represented Kosovo at youth international level, with the U17, U19 and U21 teams, appearing in fifteen matches and scoring once across all age groups. On 6 October 2023, Zyba received a call-up to the senior team for the UEFA Euro 2024 qualifying matches against Andorra and Israel. His debut came six days later against Andorra after being named in the starting line-up.

== Honours ==
Prishtina

- Kosovo Superleague: 2020–21
- Kosovar Cup: 2019–20
- Kosovar Supercup: 2020

Ballkani

- Kosovo Superleague: 2022–23
- Kosovar Supercup: 2022
