= Marko Jovanovski =

Macedonian footballer

Personal information
- Date of birth: 24 July 1988 (age 38)
- Place of birth: Skopje, SFR Yugoslavia
- Height: 1.86 m (6 ft 1 in)
- Position: Goalkeeper

Senior career*
Years	Team	Apps	(Gls)
2009	Vardar	2	(0)
2010–2011	Teteks	45	(0)
2011–2012	Shkëndija	28	(0)
2012–2013	Ethnikos Achna	0	(0)
2013–2017	Shkëndija	98	(0)
2017	Pelister	14	(0)
2018	Sepsi OSK	0	(0)
2018–2020	Makedonija	56	(0)
2020–2021	Gostivar		
2021–2023	Akademija Pandev	58	
2023–2026	Ferizaj	60	(0)

International career^{‡}
	Macedonia U17	1	(0)
	Macedonia U19	2	(0)
2007–2009	Macedonia U21	3	(0)
- * Club domestic league appearances and goals as of 1 June 2026 ‡ National team caps and goals as of 03:39, 14 September 2021 (UTC)

Marko Jovanovski (born 24 July 1988) is a Macedonian professional footballer who plays as a goalkeeper for Ferizaj.

== Career ==
In his career Jovanovski has also played for teams such as Vardar, Teteks, Shkëndija, Pelister and Cypriot side Ethnikos Achna as well as North Macedonia youth national teams.
