= Gledi Mici =

Albanian footballer (born 1991)

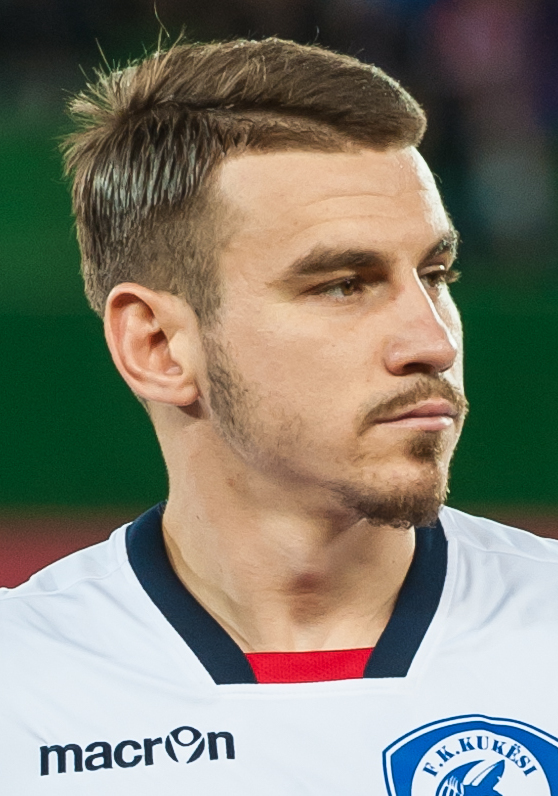
- Mici with Kukësi in 2016

Personal information
- Date of birth: 6 February 1991 (age 35)
- Place of birth: Tirana, Albania
- Height: 1.76 m (5 ft 9 in)
- Position: Left-back

Team information
- Current team: Struga
- Number: 6

Youth career
- 2000–2007: Tirana
- 2007–2009: Apolonia Fier

Senior career*
Years	Team	Apps	(Gls)
2009–2012	Kamza	24	(2)
2012–2015	Flamurtari	65	(1)
2015–2016	Kukësi	45	(1)
2016–2018	Skënderbeu	63	(0)
2018–2020	Shkëndija	52	(2)
2020–2023	Prishtina	99	(1)
2023–2025	Tirana	55	(0)
2025–	Struga	28	(0)

International career^{‡}
2007	Albania U17	3	(0)
- * Club domestic league appearances and goals as of 18 June 2026 ‡ National team caps and goals as of 30 May 2026

Gledi Mici (born 6 February 1991) is an Albanian professional footballer who plays as a left-back for Macedonian First League club Struga.

== Club career ==
=== Kukësi ===
On 4 January 2015, Mici declared that he had terminated his contract with Flamurtari through mutual consent and had joined the league leaders Kukësi as a free agent. He made his debut for the club twenty days later in a 2–1 away win against Vllaznia Shkodër, where he started the game at left-back and played the full 90 minutes. Mici made 11 league appearances during the second half of the campaign as his new side finished runner-up in the Kategoria Superiore. In the Albanian Cup he made 5 appearances for the club, as they reached the final against Laçi, where Mici played the full game in the 2–1 loss.

On 4 August 2016, Mici expressed his intention to leave the club by posting a status in his Facebook account, accusing the club for injustice against him. The player wanted to terminate his contract with the club and to do that he send the case to the Albanian Football Association's Disciplinary Committee. However, he was included in the list of the preparation phrase in Ohrid, He also accused the club president Safet Gjici for "making an unfair contract with him". Following that, Gjici said that it was worthless to keep Mici on the team, adding that he was transfer listed.

=== Skënderbeu Korçë ===
==== 2016–17 season ====
"Six titles convinced me, Skënderbeu cannot be refused."

— Mici during his presentation to Skënderbeu Korçë.

On 16 August 2016, Mici completed a move to Skënderbeu Korçë for €30,000 and signing a contract until 2018. He made his league debut for the club on 7 September 2016 in a 2–1 home win against his former club Flamurtari.

==== 2017–18 season ====
During the 2017–18 season, Mici helped Skënderbeu to qualify at Group B of UEFA Europa League group stage, where he featured in all the games. He also helped Skënderbeu Korçë win their 8th Kategoria Superiore trophy. He opted to leave the club at the end of the season, however, after UEFA announced they banned Skënderbeu Korçë from all UEFA competition for 10 years due to match-fixing.

=== Shkëndija ===
On 21 July 2018, Mici signed a two-year contract with Macedonian First League club Shkëndija. Eighteen days later, he made his debut with Shkëndija in the 2018–19 UEFA Champions League third qualifying round against the Austrian side Red Bull Salzburg after coming on as a substitute at 77th minute in place of Mevlan Murati.

=== Prishtina ===
On 10 September 2020, Mici joined Kosovo Superleague side Prishtina. Nine days later, he made his debut against Drenica after being named in the starting line-up and assists in his side's first goal during a 3–0 home win. On 3 June 2021, after he helped Prishtina win the title, he signed a 3-year extension.

== International career ==
"I am sorry that I do not play with "Dardanians" in these two matches, Kosovo has always been Albania."

— Mici after not being allowed by the club to join Kosovo.

Mici represented Albania U17 at 2008 UEFA European Under-17 Championship qualifying round and played in all three games as a starter. On 31 May 2021, the Football Federation of Kosovo announced that Mici has decided to represent their national team and received call-up for the friendly matches against Guinea and Gambia, but a day later the Football Federation of Kosovo confirmed that he and his three Prishtina teammates who were called up for these matches will not be part of the national team following the club's request to release them from the squad in order to be as fresh as possible for the 2021–22 UEFA Champions League preliminary round matches.

== Personal life ==
Mici was born in Albania's capital city Tirana to Albanian parents from Fier. In addition to the Albanian passport, he also has United States passport and is in the process of obtaining Kosovan passport.

== Career statistics ==
As of 8 May 2024

Club statistics
Club	Season	League			Cup		Continental		Other		Total	
Club	Season	Division	Apps	Goals	Apps	Goals	Apps	Goals	Apps	Goals	Apps	Goals
Kamza	2011–12	Kategoria Superiore	24	2	12	0	—		1 (Note: All appearance(s) in Kategoria Superiore relegation playoffs)	0	37	2
Flamurtari	2012–13	Kategoria Superiore	23	0	7	0	2 (Note: All appearance(s) in UEFA Europa League)	0	—		32	0
Flamurtari	2013–14	Kategoria Superiore	27	1	5	0	—		—		32	1
Flamurtari	2014–15	Kategoria Superiore	15	0	0	0	4	0	1 (Note: Appearance in Albanian Supercup)	0	20	0
Flamurtari	Total		89	3	24	0	6	0	2	0	121	3
Kukësi	2014–15	Kategoria Superiore	11	0	5	0	—		—		16	0
Kukësi	2015–16	Kategoria Superiore	34	1	7	0	6	0	—		47	1
Kukësi	2016–17	Kategoria Superiore	—		—		4	0	—		4	0
Kukësi	Total		45	1	12	0	10	0	—		67	1
Skënderbeu Korçë	2016–17	Kategoria Superiore	32	0	6	0	—		1	0	39	0
Skënderbeu Korçë	2017–18	Kategoria Superiore	31	0	7	0	14	0	—		52	0
Skënderbeu Korçë	Total		63	0	13	0	14	0	1	0	91	0
Shkëndija	2018–19	Macedonian First League	32	1	2	0	4 (Note: Appearance(s) in UEFA Champions League & UEFA Europa League)	0	—		38	1
Shkëndija	2019–20	Macedonian First League	20	1	1	0	4	0	—		25	1
Shkëndija	Total		52	2	3	0	8	0	0	0	63	2
Prishtina	2020–21	Kosovo Superleague	33	1	3	0	—		1 (Note: Appearance in Kosovar Supercup)	0	37	1
Prishtina	2021–22	Kosovo Superleague	33	0	3	1	8	0	1	0	45	1
Prishtina	2021–22	Kosovo Superleague	33	0	4	0	—		—		37	0
Prishtina	Total		99	1	10	1	8	0	2	0	119	2
Tirana	2023–24	Kategoria Superiore	25	0	4	0	1	0	—		30	0
Career total			373	7	66	1	47	0	5	0	491	8

== Honours ==
=== Club ===
Flamurtari

- Albanian Cup: 2013–14

Kukësi

- Albanian Cup: 2015–16

Skënderbeu Korçë

- Kategoria Superiore: 2017–18
- Albanian Cup: 2017–18

Shkëndija

- Macedonian First League: 2018–19

Prishtina

- Kosovar Supercup: 2020
- Kosovo Superleague: 2020–21

=== Individual ===
- Kategoria Superiore Talent of the Season: 2012–13
