= Giacomo Nava =

Italian footballer (born 1997)

Personal information
- Date of birth: 27 January 1997 (age 29)
- Place of birth: Lavagna, Italy
- Height: 1.94 m (6 ft 4 in)
- Position: Goalkeeper

Youth career
- –2016: Sampdoria

Senior career*
Years	Team	Apps	(Gls)
2015–2017	Sampdoria	0	(0)
2015–2016	→ RapalloBogliasco (loan)	25	(0)
2016–2017	→ Lentigione (loan)	33	(0)
2017–2018	Lecco	34	(0)
2018–2019	Rimini	15	(0)
2020–2021	Llapi	20	(0)
2022–2023	Birkirkara	20	(0)

International career^{‡}
2012	Italy U15	1	(0)
- * Club domestic league appearances and goals as of 21 April 2023 ‡ National team caps and goals as of 28 April 2012

Giacomo Nava (born 27 January 1997) is an Italian professional footballer who last played as a goalkeeper for Maltese club Birkirkara.

== Club career ==
=== Llapi ===
On 7 January 2020, Nava signed a one-and-a-half-year contract with Kosovo Superleague club Llapi to replace the departed Bledar Hajdini as the first choice. On 16 February 2020, he made his debut in a 0–0 away draw against Dukagjini after being named in the starting line-up.

== International career ==
On 20 April 2012, Nava was named as part of the Italy U15 squad for 2012 Torneo delle Nazioni to replace the injured Andrea Zaccagno. Eight days later, he made his debut with Italy U15 in a 2012 Torneo delle Nazioni match against Croatia U16 after being named in the starting line-up.

== Honours ==
Birkirkara

- Maltese FA Trophy: 2022–23
