= Abdulkadir Bitigen =

Turkish football referee

- Born: 12 February 1983 (age 43); Kayseri, Turkey

Domestic
Years	League	Role
2007–2012	TFF Third League	Referee
2011–2018	TFF Second League	Referee
2013–2019	TFF First League	Referee
2014–	Süper Lig	Referee

International
Years	League	Role
2021–	FIFA listed	Referee

Abdulkadir Bitigen (born 12 February 1983) is a Turkish football referee who officiates in the Süper Lig. He has been a FIFA referee since 2021, and is ranked as a UEFA second category referee.

== Refereeing career ==
Bitigen began officiating in the TFF Third League in 2007, the TFF Second League in 2011, the TFF First League in 2013 and the Süper Lig in 2014. His first Süper Lig match as referee was on 30 August 2014 between Eskişehirspor and Konyaspor. In 2021, he was put on the FIFA referees list.

Bitigen often works as a video assistant referee, including in the 2019 and 2020 editions of the Turkish Super Cup. He was also the assistant VAR in the 2020 Turkish Cup Final between Trabzonspor and Alanyaspor. In January 2021, he officiated the 2020 Kosovar Supercup between Drita and Prishtina.

On 23 April 2021, Bitigen was selected by FIFA as a video assistant referee for the football tournaments at the 2020 Summer Olympics in Japan.
