= Nazmi Gripshi =

Albanian footballer (born 1997)

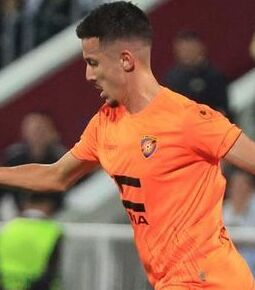
- Gripshi with Ballkani in 2023

Personal information
- Date of birth: 5 July 1997 (age 29)
- Place of birth: Durrës, Albania
- Height: 1.76 m (5 ft 9 in)
- Position: Attacking midfielder

Team information
- Current team: Rubin Kazan
- Number: 11

Youth career
- 2011–2014: Teuta

Senior career*
Years	Team	Apps	(Gls)
2014–2015	Teuta B	8	(1)
2014–2017	Teuta	32	(2)
2017–2020	Skënderbeu	89	(12)
2020–2024	Ballkani	120	(24)
2024–2026	Astana	38	(22)
2026–	Rubin Kazan	20	(1)

International career^{‡}
2015	Albania U19	3	(0)
2017	Albania U21	1	(0)
2025–	Albania	1	(0)
- * Club domestic league appearances and goals as of 31 October 2026 ‡ National team caps and goals as of 14 October 2025

Nazmi Gripshi (born 5 July 1997) is an Albanian professional footballer who plays as an attacking midfielder for Russian Premier League club Rubin Kazan and the Albania national team.

== Club career ==
=== Teuta Durrës ===
Gripshi came up through the Teuta Durrës youth academy and made his senior league debut for the club on 9 May 2015 in a 3–2 away loss to Kukësi. He was subbed on in the 78th minute for Resul Kastrati. He scored his first senior goal on 19 September 2015 in the 3–1 league win over bottom side Tërbuni Pukë, netting the third in injury time with a counter-attack.

=== Skënderbeu Korçë ===
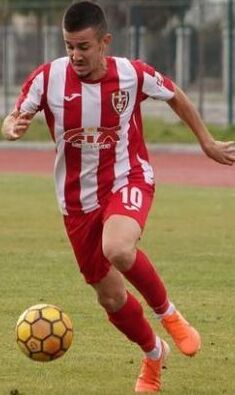
Gripshi with Skënderbeu Korçë in 2019

On 29 January 2017, Gripshi completed a move to fellow Kategoria Superiore side Skënderbeu Korçë for a fee of €60,000. He was presented two days later where he penned a four-year contract. He made his league debut for the club on 6 February 2017 in a 1–0 away win over Korabi Peshkopi, entering in the final minutes in place of Cornel Predescu. He opened his scoring account on the final game versus Partizani Tirana which finished in a 2–2 draw at home.

In the 2017–18 season, Gripshi made 15 appearances between league and cup with Skënderbeu Korçë completing the domestic double for the first time in history.

In July 2018, ahead of the 2018–19 season, Gripshi changed his squad number from 97 to 10, which was vacated for two years following the retirement of club legend Bledi Shkëmbi.

On 24 August 2019, in Skënderbeu's opening match of the 2019–20 season against Flamurtari Vlorë, Gripshi scored the only goal of the match in the 95th minute in a 1–0 home win in Kategoria Superiore.

=== Rubin Kazan ===
On 19 February 2026, Gripshi signed a three-and-a-half-year contract with Russian club Rubin Kazan.

== International career ==
=== Youth ===
In March 2017, during a training camp with the Albania national under-21 team for friendly matches against Moldova, Keidi Bare was called up to the Albania national senior team, leaving the U21 camp. As a result, coach Alban Bushi called up Gripshi as a replacement to take part in the second match against Moldova U21 on 27 March 2017, where he appeared as a substitute in the second half.

In January 2018, Gripshi received his first call-up to the Albania national under-20 team from coach Alban Bushi for friendly matches against Azerbaijan U21, scheduled for 21 and 26 January 2018.

=== Senior ===
After four years at Ballkani and his stay in Kosovo, it was rumored that Gripshi as a potential candidate to be called up by the Kosovo national team and he did not rule out the possibility of accepting the invitation. But Kosovo's team manager, Bajram Shala, dismissed these rumors, stating that players of Albania should play for Albania and players of Kosovo should play for Kosovo.

On 7 October 2025, Gripshi received a call-up to the Albania national team for the 2026 World Cup qualification match against Serbia and friendly match against Jordan, replacing the injured Adrion Pajaziti, who had withdrawn from the squad.

== Career statistics ==
=== Club ===
As of match played 31 October 2026

Appearances and goals by club, season and competition
Club	Season	League			Cup		Europe		Other		Total	
Club	Season	Division	Apps	Goals	Apps	Goals	Apps	Goals	Apps	Goals	Apps	Goals
Teuta Durrës B	2014–15	Kategoria e Dytë	8	1	—		—		—		8	1
Teuta Durrës	2014–15	Kategoria Superiore	2	0	0	0	—		—		2	0
Teuta Durrës	2015–16	Kategoria Superiore	14	2	3	2	—		—		17	4
Teuta Durrës	2016–17	Kategoria Superiore	19	1	2	1	2 (Note: Appearance(s) in UEFA Europa League)	0	—		23	2
Teuta Durrës	Total		43	4	5	3	2	0	0	0	50	7
Skënderbeu Korçë	2016–17	Kategoria Superiore	10	1	3	0	—		—		13	1
Skënderbeu Korçë	2017–18	Kategoria Superiore	9	1	6	1	0	0	—		15	2
Skënderbeu Korçë	2018–19	Kategoria Superiore	34	2	5	2	0	0	1 (Note: Appearance in Albanian Supercup)	0	40	4
Skënderbeu Korçë	2019–20	Kategoria Superiore	36	8	4	0	—		—		40	8
Skënderbeu Korçë	Total		89	12	18	3	0	0	1	0	108	15
Ballkani	2020–21	Kosovo Superleague	31	6	1	0	—		—		32	6
Ballkani	2021–22	Kosovo Superleague	32	3	1	0	—		—		33	3
Ballkani	2022–23	Kosovo Superleague	26	0	1	0	10 (Note: Two appearances, one goal in UEFA Champions League, eight appearances, one goal in UEFA Conference League)	2	1 (Note: Appearances in Kosovar Supercup)	0	38	2
Ballkani	2023–24	Kosovo Superleague	31	15	4	2	14 (Note: Two appearances in UEFA Champions League, twelve appearances, three goals in UEFA Conference League)	3	1	0	50	20
Ballkani	Total		120	24	7	2	24	5	2	0	153	37
Astana	2024	Kazakhstan Premier League	12	6	0	0	10 (Note: Appearance(s) in the UEFA Conference League)	2	2 (Note: Appearance(s) in the Kazakhstan League Cup)	1	24	9
Astana	2025	Kazakhstan Premier League	26	16	0	0	3	0	0	0	29	16
Astana	Total		38	22	0	0	13	2	2	1	53	25
Rubin Kazan	2025–26	Russian Premier League	11	1	—		—		—		11	1
Rubin Kazan	2026–27	Russian Premier League	9	0	5	0	—		—		14	0
Rubin Kazan	Total		20	1	5	0	0	0	0	0	25	1
Career total			310	63	35	8	39	7	5	1	389	79

== Honours ==
Skënderbeu Korçë

- Kategoria Superiore: 2017–18
- Albanian Cup: 2017–18
- Albanian Supercup: 2018

Ballkani

- Kosovo Superleague: 2021–22, 2022–23, 2023–24
- Kosovar Cup: 2023–24
- Kosovar Supercup: 2022, 2024

Astana

- Kazakhstan League Cup: 2024
