= Edvin Kuč =

Montenegrin footballer

Personal information
- Full name: Edvin Kuč
- Date of birth: 27 October 1993 (age 33)
- Place of birth: Tuzi, FR Yugoslavia
- Height: 1.79 m (5 ft 10 in)
- Position: Defensive midfielder

Team information
- Current team: Ballkani
- Number: 20

Youth career
- –2012: Ibar

Senior career*
Years	Team	Apps	(Gls)
2012–2013	Berane	10	(0)
2013–2014	Dečić	29	(3)
2014–2015	Ústí nad Labem	14	(0)
2015–2016	Mladost Podgorica	12	(0)
2016–2017	Dečić	31	(6)
2017–2019	Rudar Pljevlja	44	(6)
2019–2024	Ballkani	159	(20)
2024–2026	Neftçi	37	(1)
2026–	Ballkani	0	(0)

International career^{‡}
2023–	Montenegro	7	(3)
- * Club domestic league appearances and goals as of 22 June 2026 ‡ National team caps and goals as of 9 June 2024

Edvin Kuč (Albanian: Edvin Kuçi; born 27 October 1993) is a Montenegrin professional footballer who plays as a defensive midfielder for Azerbaijani club Neftçi and the Montenegro national team.

== International career ==
Kuč was eligible to represent three countries on international level, either Bosnia and Herzegovina, Montenegro or Kosovo, with the latter, he has expressed interest in joining. On 19 May 2023, the then head coach of Kosovo, Primož Gliha declared that he did not count on Kuč because of his age, and seven days later, he was called up to the Montenegro national team for the first time.

=== International goals ===
Scores and results list Montenegro's goal tally first, score column indicates score after each Kuč goal.

No.	Date	Venue	Opponent	Score	Result	Competition
1	12 October 2023	Podgorica City Stadium, Podgorica, Montenegro	Lebanon	1–0	3–2	Friendly
2	12 October 2023	Podgorica City Stadium, Podgorica, Montenegro	Lebanon	2–0	3–2	Friendly
3	16 November 2023	Podgorica City Stadium, Podgorica, Montenegro	Lithuania	1–0	2–0	UEFA Euro 2024 qualifying
4	26 March 2025	Stadion kraj Bistrice, Nikšić, Montenegro	Faroe Islands	1–0	1–0	UEFA World cup 2026 qualification

== Personal life ==
Kuč descends from the Kuči from his father, and is of Kosovo Albanian descent through his mother, and comes from a family of footballers where his two siblings, Adis and Armisa were professional footballers, the latter is one of the most important players in Montenegro women's national team.

== Honours ==
=== Club ===
Mladost Podgorica

- Montenegrin First League: 2015–16

Ballkani

- Kosovo Superleague: 2021–22, 2022–23
- Kosovar Supercup: 2022
