= Valmir Veliu =

Kosovan footballer

Personal information
- Date of birth: 4 June 2000 (age 26)
- Place of birth: Podujevë, Kosovo under UN administration
- Height: 1.77 m (5 ft 10 in)
- Position: Winger

Team information
- Current team: Prishtina
- Number: 7

Youth career
- Liridoni Football School
- –2018: Ramiz Sadiku

Senior career*
Years	Team	Apps	(Gls)
2018–2022	Llapi	104	(20)
2022–2023	Gaziantep	18	(1)
2023	→ İstanbulspor (loan)	1	(0)
2023–2025	Llapi	40	(5)
2025–	Prishtina	34	(7)

International career^{‡}
2020–2022	Kosovo U21	11	(1)
2020–	Kosovo	2	(0)
- * Club domestic league appearances and goals as of 22 June 2026 ‡ National team caps and goals as of 16 November 2022

Valmir Veliu (born 4 June 2000) is a Kosovan professional footballer who plays as a winger for Prishtina and the Kosovo national team.

== Club career ==
=== Llapi ===
On 18 June 2018, Veliu signed his first professional contract with Football Superleague of Kosovo side Llapi after agreeing to a three-year deal. On 29 September 2018, he made his debut in a 2–0 home win against KEK after coming on as a substitute of Festim Alidema.

=== Gaziantep ===
On 26 June 2022, Veliu signed a three-year contract with Süper Lig club Gaziantep. Gaziantep reportedly paid a €180 thousand transfer fee. On 6 August 2022, he made his debut in a 1–1 away draw against Sivasspor after coming on as a substitute at 64th minute in place of Lazar Marković. Veliu's contract with Gazianstep was terminated on 27 September 2023.

== International career ==
On 24 December 2019, Veliu received a call-up from Kosovo for the friendly match against Sweden, and made his debut after coming on as a substitute at 46th minute in place of Herolind Shala.

== Honours ==
Individual

- Kosovo Superleague Stars of the Week: 2025–26 (Week 1)
