= Egland Haxho =

Albanian footballer

Personal information
- Date of birth: 10 November 1988 (age 38)
- Place of birth: Tirana, Albania
- Position: Goalkeeper

Team information
- Current team: Prishtina
- Number: 35

Senior career*
Years	Team	Apps	(Gls)
2006–2010	Apolonia	25	(0)
2010–2011	Kamza	1	(0)
2011–2012	Tomori	2	(0)
2012–2014	Bylis	12	(0)
2014	Kukësi	1	(0)
2014–2015	Butrinti	25	(0)
2015–2016	Tërbuni	24	(0)
2016–2017	Renova	35	(0)
2017–2018	Partizani	0	(0)
2018–2019	Llapi	17	(0)
2019–2022	Prishtina	33	(0)
2022–2023	Valbona	0	(0)

International career
2009–2010	Albania U21	0	(0)
- * Club domestic league appearances and goals as of 16:49, 7 November 2019 (UTC)

Egland Haxho (also spelled Eglant, born 10 November 1988) is an Albanian football player who plays as a goalkeeper for FC Prishtina in the Football Superleague of Kosovo.

== Club career ==
He joined newly promoted Albanian Superliga side Tërbuni Pukë ahead of the club's debut season in the top flight. On 4 July 2019, Haxho joined Prishtina of the Football Superleague of Kosovo.

== Honours ==
Prishtina

- Kosovo Superleague: 2020–21
