= Bujar Idrizi =

Kosovar footballer (born 1991)

Personal information
- Full name: Bujar Idrizi
- Date of birth: 11 December 1991 (age 34)
- Place of birth: Podujevo, SFR Yugoslavia
- Height: 1.89 m (6 ft 2 in)
- Position: Defender

Team information
- Current team: Llapi
- Number: 4

Youth career
- 2008–2012: Hysi

Senior career*
Years	Team	Apps	(Gls)
2012–2014	Hysi		
2014	Llapi		
2014–2015	Trepça		
2015–2016	Trepça'89	30	(1)
2016–2017	Llapi	29	(1)
2017–2018	Kukësi	25	(1)
2018–2023	Llapi	105	(5)
2023–2025	Kosova Düsseldorf	69	(3)
2025–	Llapi	23	(0)
- * Club domestic league appearances and goals as of 1 June 2026

Bujar Idrizi (born 11 December 1991) is a Kosovar professional footballer who plays as a midfielder for Kosovo Superleague club Llapi.

== Club career ==
=== Llapi ===
In July 2016, Idrizi completed a transfer to Llapi by penning a 12-month contract, returning in his hometown for the first time in two-and-a-half years. In the 2016–17 season, he went on to make 29 league appearances, scoring once as Llapi finished 3rd, four points short of Europa League first qualifying round. He also played in the Kosovar Cup final in a losing effort to Besa Pejë.

=== Kukësi ===
Idrizi moved for the first time aboard Kosovo in June 2017 by signing with Kategoria Superiore side Kukësi on a one-year contract. He began his season as an unused substitute in the 2017 Albanian Supercup match in which his team was defeated by Tirana. Idrizi played his first match for Kukësi later on 16 October by entering in the last 15 minutes of a 4–2 home win versus Teuta Durrës. He netted his maiden Kukësi goal on 4 March of the following, the opener of the 2–1 win at bottom side Lushnja. Idrizi concluded his first season at Kukësi by playing 31 matches between league and cup, as Kukësi finished runner-up in championship and was knocked-out by Laçi in the Albanian Cup. Following the end of the season, Idrizi left the club after he was not given a contract renewal.

== Career statistics ==
As of 23 May 2018

Club statistics
Club	Season	League			Cup		Europe		Other		Total	
Club	Season	Division	Apps	Goals	Apps	Goals	Apps	Goals	Apps	Goals	Apps	Goals
Trepça'89	2015–16	Football Superleague of Kosovo	30	1	0	0	—		—		30	1
Llapi	2016–17	Football Superleague of Kosovo	29	1	1	0	—		—		29	1
Kukësi	2017–18	Albanian Superliga	25	1	6	0	0	0	0	0	31	1
Career total			84	3	7	0	0	0	0	0	91	3
