= Lumbardh Dellova =

Kosovar association football player

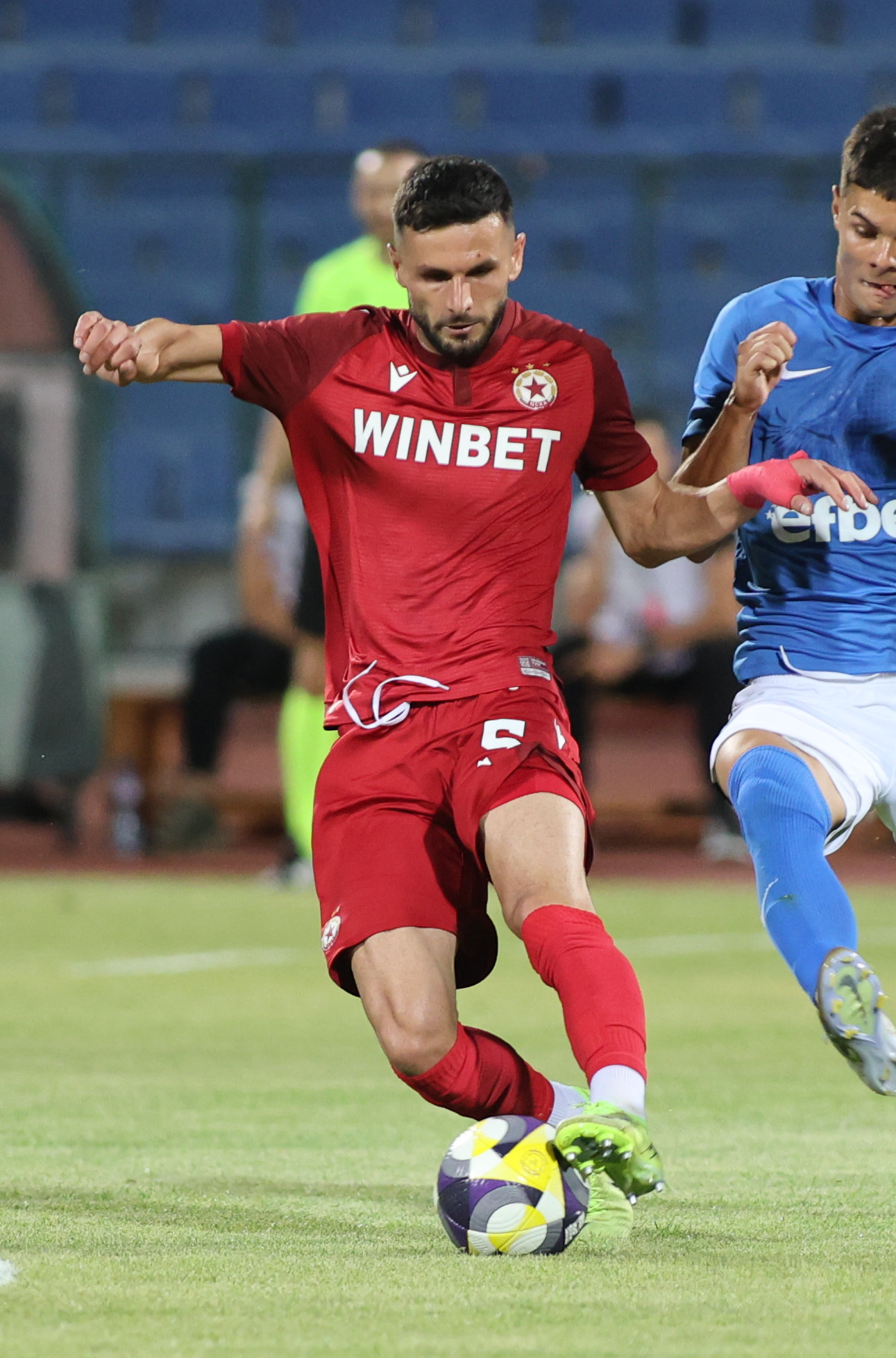

Personal information
- Full name: Lumbardh Dellova
- Date of birth: 1 January 1999 (age 27)
- Place of birth: Krushë e Madhe, FR Yugoslavia
- Height: 1.87 m (6 ft 2 in)
- Position: Centre-back

Team information
- Current team: Amedspor
- Number: 35

Youth career
- –2017: Liria Prizren

Senior career*
Years	Team	Apps	(Gls)
2016–2017	Liria Prizren		
2017–2018	Slovan		
2018	Liria Prizren		
2018–2020	Hajduk Split II	16	(0)
2020–2022	Hajduk Split	3	(0)
2020–2021	→ Prishtina (loan)	27	(1)
2022–2024	Ballkani	74	(9)
2024–2026	CSKA Sofia	60	(3)
2026–	Amedspor	3	(0)

International career^{‡}
2017	Kosovo U19	3	(0)
2019–2020	Kosovo U21	2	(0)
2022–	Kosovo	27	(3)
- * Club domestic league appearances and goals as of 10:04, 1 September 2026 (UTC) ‡ National team caps and goals as of 19:05, 4 October 2026 (UTC)

Lumbardh Dellova (born 1 January 1999) is a Kosovan professional footballer who plays as a centre-back for Süper Lig club Amedspor and the Kosovo national team.

== Club career ==
=== Hajduk Split ===
==== Beginnings in the second team ====
On 1 September 2018, Dellova signed a three-year contract with Croatian Second Football League club Hajduk Split II. On 22 March 2019, he was named as a Hajduk Split II substitute for the first time in a league match against Varaždin. His debut with Hajduk Split II came on 26 April in a 0–1 away win against Hrvatski Dragovoljac after being named in the starting line-up.

==== Unused substitute in the senior team ====
On 21 July 2019, Dellova was named as a Hajduk Split substitute for the first time in a league match against Istra 1961 and received squad number 77. In addition to this match, he has fourteen matches as an unused substitute.

===== Loan at Prishtina =====
On 8 September 2020, Dellova joined Kosovo Superleague side Prishtina, on a season-long loan. Eleven days later, he made his debut in a 3–0 home win against Drenica after being named in the starting line-up.

==== Return from loan ====
On 13 July 2021, Dellova returned to Croatian First Football League side Hajduk Split after agreeing to a four-year contract extension agreement and received squad number 16. Five days later, he made his debut in a 2–2 away draw against Lokomotiva after coming on as a substitute at 81st minute in place of Gergő Lovrencsics.

==== CSKA Sofia ====
In July 2024, he joined Bulgarian team CSKA Sofia.

== International career ==
=== Under-19 ===
On 1 October 2017, Dellova was named as part of the Kosovo U19 squad for 2018 UEFA European Under-19 Championship qualifications. Two days later, he made his debut with Kosovo U19 in a match against Austria U19 after being named in the starting line-up.

=== Under-21 ===
On 11 November 2019, Dellova received a call-up from Kosovo U21 for the 2021 UEFA European Under-21 Championship qualification match against Austria U21, and made his debut after coming on as a substitute at 66th minute in place of Leonat Vitija.

=== Senior ===
On 31 May 2021, Dellova received a call-up from Kosovo for the friendly matches against Guinea and Gambia, but a day later the Football Federation of Kosovo confirmed that he and his three Prishtina teammates who were called up for these matches will not be part of the national team following the club's request to release them from the squad in order to be as fresh as possible for the 2021–22 UEFA Champions League preliminary round matches. His debut with Kosovo came on 24 March 2022 in a friendly match against Burkina Faso after coming on as a substitute in the 72nd minute in place of Mërgim Vojvoda.

== Career statistics ==
=== Club ===
As of 25 May 2026

Appearances and goals by club, season and competition
Club	Season	League			Cup		Continental		Other		Total	
Club	Season	Division	Apps	Goals	Apps	Goals	Apps	Goals	Apps	Goals	Apps	Goals
Hajduk Split II	2018–19	Croatian Second League	4	0	0	0	—				4	0
Hajduk Split II	2019–20	Croatian Second League	12	0	0	0	—				12	0
Hajduk Split II	Total		16	0	0	0	—				16	0
Hajduk Split	2020–21	Croatian First League	0	0	0	0	—				0	0
Hajduk Split	2021–22	Croatian First League	3	0	0	0	—				3	0
Hajduk Split	Total		3	0	0	0	—				3	0
Prishtina (loan)	2020–21	Kosovo Superleague	27	1	2	0	—		1	0	30	1
Prishtina (loan)	2021–22	Kosovo Superleague	0	0	0	0	2	0	—		2	0
Prishtina (loan)	Total		27	1	2	0	2	0	1	0	32	1
Ballkani	2021–22	Kosovo Superleague	12	3	1	0	—				13	3
Ballkani	2022–23	Kosovo Superleague	30	3	1	1	14	0	1	1	46	5
Ballkani	2023–24	Kosovo Superleague	32	3	4	0	13	0	1	0	50	3
Ballkani	Total		74	9	6	1	27	0	2	1	109	11
CSKA Sofia	2024–25	Bulgarian First League	30	1	5	1	—		1	0	36	2
CSKA Sofia	2025–26	Bulgarian First League	30	2	3	0	—		0	0	33	2
CSKA Sofia	Total		60	3	8	1	0	0	1	0	69	4
Career total			180	11	16	2	29	0	4	1	229	16

=== International ===
As of match played 4 October 2026

National team	Year	Apps	Goals
Kosovo
Kosovo	2022	3	0
Kosovo	2023	4	0
Kosovo	2024	6	1
Kosovo	2025	8	2
Kosovo	2026	6	0
Total		27	3

=== International goals ===
No.	Date	Venue	Opponent	Score	Result	Competition
1.	9 September 2024	AEK Arena – Georgios Karapatakis, Larnaca, Cyprus	Cyprus	4–0	4–0	2024–25 UEFA Nations League C
2.	20 March 2025	Fadil Vokrri Stadium, Pristina, Kosovo	Iceland	1–0	2–1	2024–25 UEFA Nations League promotion/relegation play-offs
3.	6 June 2025	Fadil Vokrri Stadium, Pristina, Kosovo	Armenia	1–1	5–2	Friendly

== Honours ==
Prishtina

- Kosovo Superleague: 2020–21

Hajduk Split

- Croatian Cup: 2021–22

Ballkani

- Kosovo Superleague: 2021–22, 2022–23, 2023–24
- Kosovar Cup: 2023–24
- Kosovar Supercup: 2024

CSKA Sofia

- Bulgarian Cup: 2025–26
