= Ilir Avdyli =

Kosovar footballer

Personal information
- Full name: Ilir Avdyli
- Date of birth: 20 May 1990 (age 36)
- Place of birth: Podujevë, SFR Yugoslavia (now Kosovo)
- Height: 1.90 m (6 ft 3 in)
- Position: Goalkeeper

Team information
- Current team: Malisheva
- Number: 91

Youth career
- 2000–2007: KEK

Senior career*
Years	Team	Apps	(Gls)
2007–2012	KEK	117	(0)
2012–2013	Drenica	18	(0)
2013–2014	Ferizaj	52	(0)
2014–2016	Hajvalia	52	(0)
2016	Tirana	1	(0)
2016–2017	Llapi	27	(0)
2017–2018	Shkëndija	1	(0)
2018–2019	Kamza	36	(0)
2019–2020	Kukësi	13	(0)
2020–2021	Feronikeli	23	(0)
2021–2025	Llapi	113	(0)
2025–	Malisheva	43	(0)
- * Club domestic league appearances and goals as of 22 June 2026

Ilir Avdyli (born 20 May 1990) is a Kosovar professional footballer who plays as a goalkeeper for Kosovo Superleague club Malisheva.

== Club career ==
=== Tirana ===
On 14 January 2016. Avdyli joined Albanian Superliga side Tirana. On 8 May 2016, he made his debut in a 2–1 away defeat against Flamurtari Vlorë after being named in the starting line-up.

=== Llapi ===
On 12 July 2016. Avdyli joined Football Superleague of Kosovo side Llapi.

=== Shkëndija ===
On 26 June 2017. Avdyli joined Macedonian First Football League side Shkëndija. On 30 December 2017, he left Shkëndija, due to fierce competition.

=== Kamza ===
On 4 January 2018. Avdyli joined Albanian Superliga side Kamza, to replace the departed Argjent Halili as the second choice. On 18 March 2018, he made his debut in a 2–0 away defeat against Laçi after being named in the starting line-up.

== International career ==
On 20 May 2014. Avdyli received an urgent call-up from Kosovo for the friendly matches against Turkey and Senegal to replace the injured Samir Ujkani as the second choice, but he was an unused substitute in these matches. On 15 March 2024, he received again a call-up from Kosovo for the friendly matches against Armenia and Hungary.
