= Leotrim Bekteshi =

Kosovan footballer

Personal information
- Date of birth: 21 April 1992 (age 34)
- Place of birth: Berlin, Germany
- Height: 1.87 m (6 ft 2 in)
- Position: Centre-back

Team information
- Current team: Llapi
- Number: 28

Youth career
- –2012: Trepça '89

Senior career*
Years	Team	Apps	(Gls)
2012–2015	Trepça '89		
2015–2016	Besa Pejë		
2016	Iskra Borčice	6	(0)
2016–2018	Gjilani	30	(0)
2018–2022	Prishtina	106	(5)
2022	Mjøndalen	9	(0)
2022–2023	Ballkani	20	(1)
2023–2024	Llapi	33	(2)

International career^{‡}
2020	Kosovo	1	(0)
- * Club domestic league appearances and goals as of 15 June 2024 ‡ National team caps and goals as of 12 January 2020

Leotrim Bekteshi (born 21 April 1992) is a Kosovan former professional footballer who last played as a centre-back for Football Superleague of Kosovo club Llapi.

== Club career ==
=== Prishtina ===
On 31 May 2018, Bekteshi signed a two-year contract with Football Superleague of Kosovo club Prishtina. On 26 August 2018, he made his debut in a 2–0 away win against Trepça '89 after being named in the starting line-up.

=== Mjøndalen ===
On 16 February 2022, Bekteshi joined Norwegian First Division side Mjøndalen. On 4 April 2022, he made his debut in a 1–0 home win against Kongsvinger after being named in the starting line-up. On 13 August 2022, Bekteshi had his contract terminated by mutual consent.

=== Ballkani ===
On 27 August 2022, Bekteshi signed a two-year contract with Football Superleague of Kosovo club Ballkani. His debut with Ballkani came twelve days later in the 2022–23 UEFA Europa Conference League group stage against CFR Cluj after coming on as a substitute at 79th minute in place of Qëndrim Zyba.

== International career ==
On 24 December 2019, Bekteshi received a call-up from Kosovo for the friendly match against Sweden, and made his debut after being named in the starting line-up.

== Personal life ==
Bekteshi was born in Berlin, Germany from Kosovo Albanian parents from Mitrovica.
