= Mardan Sports Complex =

Football stadium in Antalya, Turkey

Coordinates: 36°53′28″N 30°54′19″E

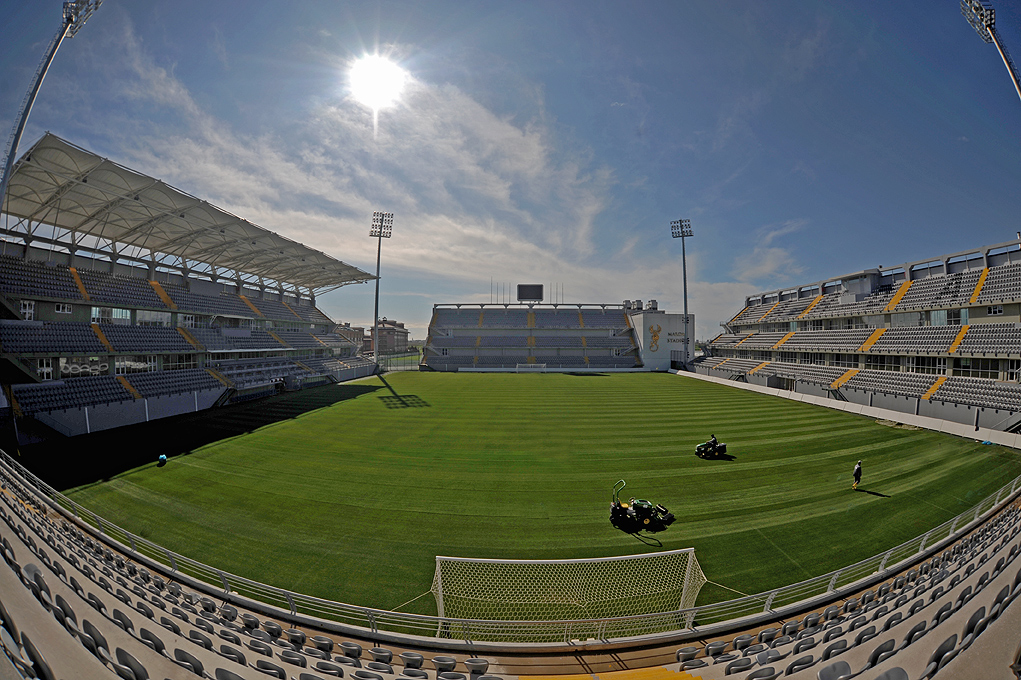
- Interactive map of Mardan Sports Complex
- Location: Aksu, Antalya, Turkey
- Capacity: 7,428
- Surface: Grass
- Field size: 105 by 68 metres (115 by 74 yards)

Construction
- Groundbreaking: 2007
- Built: 2007–2008
- Opened: 2008

Tenant
- Antalyaspor

Mardan Sports Complex (Turkish: Mardan Spor Kompleksi) is a multi-purpose stadium in Aksu, Antalya, Turkey. It is currently used mostly for football matches, and it hosted matches during the 2008 UEFA European Under-17 Championship, including the final. The stadium has a seating capacity of 7,428.
