= Besnik Krasniqi =

Kosovar footballer

Personal information
- Date of birth: 1 February 1990 (age 36)
- Place of birth: Pristina, Kosovo
- Height: 1.81 m (5 ft 11 in)
- Position: Right back

Team information
- Current team: Drita
- Number: 2

Youth career
- 1999–2009: Prishtina

Senior career*
Years	Team	Apps	(Gls)
2009–2013	Prishtina	80	(13)
2013–2014	Partizani	31	(0)
2014	Teuta	15	(1)
2015	Istogu	33	(6)
2015	Gjilani	6	(0)
2016	Flamurtari	16	(0)
2016–2017	Feronikeli	2	(0)
2017	Llapi	7	(0)
2018	Vëllaznimi	16	(2)
2018–2020	Ballkani	55	(3)
2020–2022	Prishtina	67	(21)
2022–	Drita	139	(43)
- * Club domestic league appearances and goals as of 13 October 2026

Besnik Krasniqi (born 1 February 1990) is a Kosovar professional footballer who plays as a right back for Drita in the Kosovo Superleague.

== Career ==
Krasniqi joined newly promoted Albanian Superliga side Partizani Tirana in June 2013.

He joined Teuta Durrës ahead of the 2014–15 season as a free agent, and he made 15 league appearances, scoring one goal, as well featuring in 3 cup games before leaving the club in January 2015 to return to Kosovo. He signed a 6-month contract with KF Istogu in the Football Superleague of Kosovo in January 2015, and he scored 5 goals in 13 league games as he helped the club avoid the relegation play-offs. He left the club at the end of the season to return to Albania.

Krasniqi joined newly promoted Albanian Superliga side Bylis Ballsh just before the start of the 2015–16 season.

On 28 August 2025 he scored from the penalty spot the winning goal against FC Differdange 03 that ensured FC Drita qualification for the 2025-26 UEFA Conference League league phase.

== Honours ==
Prishtina

- Kosovo Superleague: 2011–12, 2012–13, 2020–21
- Kosovar Cup: 2012-13
- Kosovar Supercup: 2013, 2020

Drita

- Kosovo Superleague: 2024–25, 2025–26
- Kosovar Supercup: 2025
