= Festim Alidema =

Kosovar footballer

Personal information
- Date of birth: 5 October 1997 (age 29)
- Place of birth: Požaranje, FR Yugoslavia
- Height: 1.80 m (5 ft 11 in)
- Position: Right winger

Team information
- Current team: Besëlidhja Lezhë
- Number: 9

Youth career
- –2017: Vllaznia Pozheran

Senior career*
Years	Team	Apps	(Gls)
2017–2018	Vllaznia Pozheran	14	(3)
2018–2019	Llapi	46	(12)
2019–2021	Slaven Belupo	5	(0)
2020	→ Hrvatski Dragovoljac (loan)	0	(0)
2020–2021	→ Drita (loan)	31	(7)
2021–2022	Llapi	57	(11)
2023–2024	Liria	17	(1)
2024	Erzeni	4	(0)
2024–2025	Pogradeci	21	(6)
2025–2026	Ballkani	17	(1)
2026–	Besëlidhja Lezhë	11	(6)
- * Club domestic league appearances and goals as of 22 June 2026

Festim Alidema (born 5 October 1997) is a Kosovan professional footballer who plays as a right winger for Besëlidhja Lezhë.

== Club career ==
=== Llapi ===
On 9 January 2018, Alidema joined Football Superleague of Kosovo side Llapi after agreeing to a one-and-a-half-year deal. On 18 February 2018, he made his debut in a 2–0 away defeat against Prishtina after coming on as a substitute at 46th minute in place of Gentrit Begolli.

=== Slaven Belupo ===
On 17 July 2019, Alidema joined Croatian First Football League side Slaven Belupo after agreeing to a two-year deal with the option of continuation for another two years. On 24 August 2019, he made his debut in a 1–1 home draw against Varaždin after coming on as a substitute at 84th minute in place of Bruno Bogojević.

==== Loan at Hrvatski Dragovoljac ====
On 7 February 2020, Alidema was loaned to Croatian Second Football League club Hrvatski Dragovoljac. Eight days later is confirmed that he had joined on a four-month-long loan and received squad number 9.

==== Loan at Drita ====
On 26 August 2020, Alidema joined Football Superleague of Kosovo side Drita, on a season-long loan.

== International career ==
On 3 June 2019, Alidema received a call-up from Kosovo for second training session before the UEFA Euro 2020 qualifying matches against Montenegro and Bulgaria, but did not become part of the final team.

== Career statistics ==
=== Club ===
As of 26 October 2019

Club	Season	League			Cup		Continental		Other		Total	
Club	Season	Division	Apps	Goals	Apps	Goals	Apps	Goals	Apps	Goals	Apps	Goals
Vllaznia Pozheran	2017–18	Football Superleague of Kosovo	15	3	1	0	—				16	3
Llapi	2017–18	Football Superleague of Kosovo	14	0	1	0	—				15	0
Llapi	2018–19	Football Superleague of Kosovo	30	12	1	0	—				31	12
Llapi	Total		59	15	3	0	—				62	15
Slaven Belupo	2019–20	Prva HNL	5	0	0	0	—				5	0
Slaven Belupo	Total		5	0	0	0	—				5	0
Career total			64	15	0	0	—				67	15
