= Leotrim Kryeziu =

Kosovar association football player

Personal information
- Date of birth: 25 January 1999 (age 27)
- Place of birth: Kamenica, FR Yugoslavia
- Height: 1.81 m (5 ft 11 in)
- Position: Forward

Team information
- Current team: Prishtina
- Number: 9

Youth career
- –2016: Drita

Senior career*
Years	Team	Apps	(Gls)
2016–2018	Drita	49	(7)
2018–2021	Lugano	1	(0)
2018–2019	→ Lugano U21	19	(19)
2019–2020	→ Chiasso (loan)	13	(0)
2020–2021	→ Prishtina (loan)	29	(9)
2021–	Prishtina	161	(32)

International career^{‡}
2017–2018	Kosovo U19	6	(5)
- * Club domestic league appearances and goals as of 22 June 2026 ‡ National team caps and goals as of 27 March 2018

Leotrim Kryeziu (born 25 January 1999) is a Kosovan professional footballer who plays as a centre-forward for Kosovan club Prishtina.

== Club career ==
=== Lugano ===
On 23 August 2018, Kryeziu signed a four-year contract with Swiss Super League club Lugano. Two days later, he made his debut with Lugano, but with under-21 team in a league match against Ibach after being named in the starting line-up and scored his first two goals during a 0–2 away win. On 2 December 2018, Kryeziu made his debut with first team in a 2–2 home win against Neuchâtel Xamax after coming on as a substitute at 83rd minute in place of Mattia Bottani.

==== Loan at Chiasso ====
On 21 August 2019, Kryeziu joined Swiss Challenge League side Chiasso, on a season-long loan. One month later, he made his debut in a 3–0 away defeat against Stade Lausanne-Ouchy after being named in the starting line-up.

=== Prishtina ===
==== 2020–21 season as loan ====
On 28 August 2020, Kryeziu joined Kosovo Superleague side Prishtina, on a season-long loan and received squad number 9. On 19 September 2020, he made his debut in a 3–0 home win against Drenica after coming on as a substitute at 85th minute in place of Lorik Boshnjaku.

==== 2021–22 season ====
On 1 July 2021, Kryeziu returned and signed a three-year contract with Kosovo Superleague side Prishtina. Five days later, he made his debut with Prishtina in the 2021–22 UEFA Champions League first qualifying round against the Hungarian side Ferencváros after being named in the starting line-up.

== International career ==
=== Under-19 ===
On 1 October 2017, Kryeziu was named as part of the Kosovo U19 squad for 2018 UEFA European Under-19 Championship qualifications. On 3 October 2017, he made his debut with Kosovo U19 in a match against Austria U19 after being named in the starting line-up.

=== Senior ===
On 22 January 2018, Kryeziu received his first call-up from Kosovo for the friendly match against Azerbaijan. The match however was cancelled two days later, postponing his debut.

== Honours ==
Drita

- Kosovo Superleague: 2017–18

Prishtina

- Kosovo Superleague: 2020–21
- Kosovar Cup: 2023–24, 2024–25
