= Kosovar Supercup =

- Organiser(s): Football Federation of Kosovo
- Founded: 1992; 34 years ago
- Region: Kosovo
- Teams: 2
- Current champions: Drita (2nd title)
- Most championships: Prishtina (11 titles)
- 2025 Kosovar Supercup

The Kosovar Supercup is an annual football match played between the winners of the previous season's Kosovo Superleague and Kosovar Cup competitions. The match is played since 1992, and is recognized by UEFA since 2016. Drita are the defending champions.

== Finals by year ==
=== 2020–2029 ===
23 January 2021 29th edition	Drita	1–3	Prishtina	Aksu, Turkey
14:00 (UTC+03:00)	Rexha 8'	Report	Zyba 3'; Krasniqi 21' (pen.); Shillova 90+3'	Stadium: Mardan Sports Complex; Attendance: 0 (Note: The match was played behind closed doors due to the COVID-19 pandemic.); Referee: Abdulkadir Bitigen (Turkey)

17 August 2021 30th edition	Prishtina	1–3	Llapi	Pristina, Kosovo
20:45	John 66'	Report	Alidema 86' (pen.), 114' (pen.); Veliu 101'	Stadium: Fadil Vokrri Stadium; Attendance: 4,000; Referee: Dardan Çaka (Kosovo)

21 January 2023 31st edition	Ballkani	1–0	Llapi	Belek, Turkey
15:00 (UTC+03:00)	Dellova 62'	Report		Stadium: Titanic Deluxe Football Center; Attendance: 0 Referee: Krzysztof Jakubik (Poland)

20 January 2024 32nd edition	Ballkani	1–2	Prishtina	Aksu, Turkey
13:00 (UTC+03:00)	Dulaj 79'	Report	Sinani 9'; Kryeziu 46'	Stadium: Mardan Sports Complex; Attendance: 0

2024 33rd edition	Ballkani (as winners double)	Kosovo
	Report

25 January 2026 34th edition	Drita	2–1	Prishtina	Aksu, Turkey
14:30 (UTC+03:00)	Bes. Krasniqi 39'; Abazaj 50'	Report	Kryeziu 8'	Stadium: Mardan Sports Complex

== Titles ==
=== By team ===
Team	W	RU	Years won	Years runners-up
Prishtina	11	6	1995, 1996, 2001, 2004, 2006, 2008, 2009, 2013, 2016, 2020, 2023	1994, 2000, 2012, 2018, 2021, 2025
Besa Pejë	2	3	2005, 2007	2006, 2011, 2017
Drita	2	2	2018, 2025	2001, 2020
Feronikeli	2	2	2015, 2019	2014, 2016
Ballkani	2	1	2022, 2024	2023
Trepça'89	2	0	2012, 2017	—
Hysi	1	1	2011	2009
Llapi	1	0	2021	—
Vushtrria	1	0	2014	—
Trepça	1	0	2010	—
KEK	1	0	2003	—
Besiana	1	0	2002	—
Gjilani	1	0	2000	—
Dukagjini	1	0	1994	—

=== League-and-Cup Doubles ===
Team	Winner	Years won
Feronikeli	2	2015, 2019
Ballkani	1	2024
Prishtina	1	2013
Besa Pejë	1	2005
Besiana	1	2002
