= Maltese football clubs in European competitions =

This is a list of Maltese football clubs in European competitions. Maltese clubs have participated since 1961, when Hibernians entered the 1961–62 European Cup and Floriana entered the 1961–62 European Cup Winners' Cup.

== Active competitions ==
=== European Cup / UEFA Champions League ===
The competition was named the European Cup until 1991–92, when it switched its name to the UEFA Champions League.

Season	Team	Round	Opponent	Home	Away	Aggregate
European Cup
1961–62	Hibernians	PR	(Switzerland) Servette	1–2	0–5	1–7
1962–63	Floriana	PR	(England) Ipswich Town	1–4	0–10	1–14
1963–64	Valletta	PR	(Czechoslovakia) Dukla Prague	0–2	0–6	0–8
1964–65	Sliema Wanderers	PR	(Romania) Dinamo București	0–2	0–5	0–7
1965–66	Sliema Wanderers	PR	(Greece) Panathinaikos	1–0	1–4	2–4
1966–67	Sliema Wanderers	PR	(Bulgaria) CSKA Sofia	1–2	0–4	1–6
1967–68	Hibernians	1R	(England) Manchester United	0–0	0–4	0–4
1968–69	Floriana	1R	(Finland) Reipas Lahti	1–1	0–2	1–3
1969–70	Hibernians	1R	(Czechoslovakia) Spartak Trnava	2–2	0–4	2–6
1970–71	Floriana	1R	(Portugal) Sporting CP	0–4	0–5	0–9
1971–72	Sliema Wanderers	1R	(Iceland) ÍA Akranes	0–0	4–0	4–0
1971–72	Sliema Wanderers	2R	(Scotland) Celtic	1–2	0–5	1–7
1972–73	Sliema Wanderers	1R	(Poland) Górnik Zabrze	0–5	0–5	0–10
1973–74	Floriana	1R	(Belgium) Club Brugge	0–2	0–8	0–10
1974–75	Valletta	1R	(Finland) HJK Helsinki	1–0	1–4	2–4
1975–76	Floriana	1R	(Socialist Federal Republic of Yugoslavia) Hajduk Split	0–5	0–3	0–8
1976–77	Sliema Wanderers	1R	(Finland) TPS Turku	2–1	0–1	2–2 (a)
1977–78	Floriana	1R	(Greece) Panathinaikos	1–1	0–4	1–5
1978–79	Valletta	1R	(Switzerland) Grasshopper	3–5	0–8	3–13
1979–80	Hibernians	1R	(Republic of Ireland) Dundalk	1–0	0–2	1–2
1980–81	Valletta	PR	(Hungary) Budapest Honvéd	0–3	0–8	0–11
1981–82	Hibernians	1R	(Socialist Federal Republic of Yugoslavia) Red Star Belgrade	1–2	1–8	2–10
1982–83	Hibernians	1R	(Poland) Widzew Łódź	1–4	1–3	2–7
1983–84	Ħamrun Spartans	1R	(Scotland) Dundee United	0–3	0–3	0–6
1984–85	Valletta	1R	Austria Wien	0–4	0–4	0–8
1985–86	Rabat Ajax	1R	(Cyprus) Omonia	0–5	0–5	0–10
1986–87	Rabat Ajax	1R	(Portugal) Porto	0–1	0–9	0–10
1987–88	Ħamrun Spartans	1R	(Austria) Rapid Wien	0–1	1–3	1–4
1988–89	Ħamrun Spartans	1R	(Albania) 17 Nëntori	2–1	0–2	2–3
1989–90	Sliema Wanderers	1R	(Albania) 17 Nëntori	1–0	0–5	1–5
1990–91	Valletta	1R	(Scotland) Rangers	0–4	0–6	0–10
1991–92	Ħamrun Spartans	1R	(Portugal) Benfica	0–6	0–4	0–10
UEFA Champions League
1992–93	Valletta	PR	(Israel) Maccabi Tel Aviv	1–2	0–1	1–3
1993–94	Floriana	PR	(Lithuania) Ekranas	1–0	1–0	2–0
1993–94	Floriana	1R	(Portugal) Porto	0–0	0–2	0–2
1994–95	None entered^{1}					
1995–96	None entered^{1}					
1996–97	None entered^{1}					
1997–98	Valletta	1QR	(Latvia) Skonto Riga	1–0	0–2	1–2
1998–99	Valletta	1QR	(Cyprus) Anorthosis Famagusta	0–2	0–6	0–8
1999–00	Valletta	1QR	(Wales) Barry Town	3–2	0–0	3–2
1999–00	Valletta	2QR	(Austria) Rapid Wien	0–2	0–3	0–5
2000–01	Birkirkara	1QR	(Iceland) KR Reykjavík	1–2	1–4	2–6
2001–02	Valletta	1QR	(Finland) Haka	0–0	0–5	0–5
2002–03	Hibernians	1QR	(Republic of Ireland) Shelbourne	2–2	1–0	3–2
2002–03	Hibernians	2QR	(Portugal) Boavista	3–3	0–4	3–7
2003–04	Sliema Wanderers	1QR	(Latvia) Skonto Riga	2–0	1–3	3–3 (a)
2003–04	Sliema Wanderers	2QR	(Denmark) Copenhagen	0–6	1–4	1–10
2004–05	Sliema Wanderers	1QR	(Lithuania) FBK Kaunas	0–2	1–4	1–6
2005–06	Sliema Wanderers	1QR	(Moldova) Sheriff Tiraspol	1–4	0–2	1–6
2006–07	Birkirkara	1QR	(Faroe Islands) B36 Tórshavn	0–3	2–2	2–5
2007–08	Marsaxlokk	1QR	(Bosnia and Herzegovina) Sarajevo	0–6	1–3	1–9
2008–09	Valletta	1QR	(Slovakia) Artmedia	0–2	0–1	0–3
2009–10	Hibernians	1Q	(Montenegro) Mogren	0–2	0–4	0–6
2010–11	Birkirkara	1QR	(Andorra) FC Santa Coloma	4–3	3–0^{2}	7–3
2010–11	Birkirkara	2QR	(Slovakia) MŠK Žilina	1–0	0–3	1–3
2011–12	Valletta	1QR	(San Marino) Tre Fiori	2–1	3–0	5–1
2011–12	Valletta	2QR	(Lithuania) Ekranas	2–3	0–1	2–4
2012–13	Valletta	1QR	(Andorra) Lusitanos	8–0	1–0	9–0
2012–13	Valletta	2QR	(Serbia) Partizan	1–4	1–3	2–7
2013–14	Birkirkara	2QR	(Slovenia) Maribor	0–0	0–2	0–2
2014–15	Valletta	2QR	(Azerbaijan) Qarabağ	0–1	0–4	0–5
2015–16	Hibernians	2QR	(Israel) Maccabi Tel Aviv	2–1	1–5	3–6
2016–17	Valletta	1QR	(Faroe Islands) B36 Tórshavn	1–0	1–2	2–2 (a)
2016–17	Valletta	2QR	(Serbia) Red Star Belgrade	1–2	1–2	2–4
2017–18	Hibernians	1QR	(Estonia) FCI Tallinn	2–0	1–0	3–0
2017–18	Hibernians	2QR	(Austria) Red Bull Salzburg	0–3	0–3	0–6
2018–19	Valletta	1QR	(Albania) Kukësi	1–1	0–0	1–1 (a)
2019–20	Valletta	1QR	(Luxembourg) F91 Dudelange	1–1	2–2	3–3 (a)
2019–20	Valletta	2QR	(Hungary) Ferencváros	1–1	1–3	2–4
2020–21	Floriana	1QR	(Romania) CFR Cluj	0–2	—N/a	—N/a
2021–22	Hibernians	1QR	(Estonia) Flora	0–3	0–2	0–5
2022–23	Hibernians	1QR	(Republic of Ireland) Shamrock Rovers	0–0	0–3	0−3
2023–24	Ħamrun Spartans	1QR	(Israel) Maccabi Haifa	0–4	1–2	1−6
2024–25	Ħamrun Spartans	1QR	(Gibraltar) Lincoln Red Imps	0–1	1–0	1–1 (4–5 p.)
2025–26	Ħamrun Spartans	1QR	(Lithuania) FK Žalgiris	2–0	0–2	2–2 (11–10 p.)
2025–26	Ħamrun Spartans	2QR	(Ukraine) FC Dynamo Kyiv	0–3	0–3	0–6
2026–27	Floriana	1QR	(Republic of Ireland) Shamrock Rovers	2–0	1–5	3–5

PR = Preliminary round; 1R/2R = First/Second round; 1QR/2QR = First/Second qualifying round; QF = Quarter-finals

Note 1: No clubs entered the Champions League during these seasons as a result of restructuring by UEFA, with entry to the competition limited to the continent's top 24 countries. The league champions entered the UEFA Cup instead.
Note 2: Match originally postponed due to bad pitch conditions caused by heavy rain. FC Santa Coloma suggested an alternative on 30 June, but UEFA awarded Birkirkara a 3–0 away win on 1 July.

=== Inter-Cities Fairs Cup / UEFA Cup / UEFA Europa League ===
While the Inter-Cities Fairs Cup (1955–1971) is recognised as the predecessor to the UEFA Cup, it was not organised by UEFA. Consequently, UEFA does not consider clubs' records in the Fairs Cup to be part of their European record. The competition was named UEFA Cup from 1971–72 until 2008–09, than it switched name to UEFA Europa League.

Season	Team	Round	Opponent	Home	Away	Aggregate
Inter-Cities Fairs Cup
1968–69	Hibernians	1R	(Greece) Aris Thessaloniki	0–6	0–1	0–7
1969–70	Floriana	1R	(Romania) Dinamo Bacău	0–1	0–6	0–7
1970–71	Sliema Wanderers	1R	(Denmark) Akademisk BK	2–3	0–7	2–10
UEFA Cup
1971–72	Marsa	1R	(Italy) Juventus	0–6	0–5	0–11
1972–73	Valletta	1R	(Italy) Inter Milan	0–1	1–6	1–7
1973–74	Sliema Wanderers	1R	(Bulgaria) Lokomotiv Plovdiv	0–2	0–1	0–3
1975–76	Sliema Wanderers	1R	(Portugal) Sporting CP	1–2	1–3	1–5
1977–78	Sliema Wanderers	1R	(West Germany) Eintracht Frankfurt	0–0	0–5	0–5
1979–80	Valletta	1R	(England) Leeds United	0–4	0–3	0–7
1980–81	Sliema Wanderers	1R	(Spain) Barcelona	0–2	0–1	0–3
1981–82	Sliema Wanderers	1R	(Greece) Aris Thessaloniki	2–4	0–4	2–8
1982–83	Żurrieq	1R	(Socialist Federal Republic of Yugoslavia) Hajduk Split	1–4	0–4	1–8
1983–84	Rabat Ajax	1R	(Czechoslovakia) Inter Bratislava	0–10	0–6	0–16
1984–85	Rabat Ajax	1R	(Socialist Federal Republic of Yugoslavia) Partizan	0–2	0–2	0–4
1985–86	Ħamrun Spartans	1R	(Albania) Dinamo Tirana	0–0	0–1	0–1
1987–88	Valletta	1R	(Italy) Juventus	0–4	0–3	0–7
1988–89	Sliema Wanderers	1R	(Romania) Victoria București	0–2	1–6	1–8
1989–90	Valletta	1R	(Austria) First Vienna	1–4	0–3	1–7
1991–92	Floriana	1R	(Switzerland) Neuchâtel Xamax	0–0	0–2	0–2
1992–93	Floriana	1R	(Germany) Borussia Dortmund	0–1	2–7	2–8
1993–94	Valletta	1R	(Turkey) Trabzonspor	1–3	1–3	2–6
1994–95	Hibernians	PR	(Belarus) Dinamo Minsk	4–3	1–3	5–6 (a.e.t.)
1994–95	Valletta	PR	(Romania) Rapid București	2–6	1–1	3–7
1995–96	Hibernians	PR	(Ukraine) Chornomorets Odesa	2–5	0–2	2–7
1995–96	Sliema Wanderers	PR	(Cyprus) Omonia	1–2	0–3	1–5
1996–97	Floriana	PR	(Israel) Beitar Jerusalem'	1–5	1–3	2–8
1996–97	Sliema Wanderers	PR	(Georgia (country)) Margveti Zestafoni	1–3	3–0	4–3
1996–97	Sliema Wanderers	QR	(Denmark) Odense BK	0–2	1–7	1–9
1997–98	Birkirkara	1QR	(Slovakia) Spartak Trnava	0–1	1–3	1–4
1998–99	Birkirkara	1QR	(Ukraine) Shakhtar Donetsk	0–4	1–2	1–6
1999–00	Birkirkara	QR	(Denmark) Lyngby BK	0–0	0–7	0–7
1999–00	Sliema Wanderers	QR	(Switzerland) FC Zürich	0–3	0–1	0–4
2000–01	Sliema Wanderers	QR	(Serbia and Montenegro) Partizan	2–1	1–4	3–5
2000–01	Valletta	QR	(Croatia) Rijeka	4–5	2–3	6–8 (a.e.t.)
2001–02	Birkirkara	QR	(Georgia (country)) Locomotive Tbilisi	0–0	1–1	1–1 (a)
2001–02	Birkirkara	1R	(Russia) Dynamo Moscow	0–0	0–1	0–1
2001–02	Sliema Wanderers	QR	(Slovakia) Matador Púchov	2–1	0–3	2–4
2002–03	Birkirkara	QR	(Ukraine) Metalurh Zaporizhya	0–0	0–3	0–3
2002–03	Sliema Wanderers	QR	(Poland) Polonia Warsaw	1–3	0–2	1–5
2003–04	Birkirkara	QR	(Hungary) Ferencváros	0–5	0–1	0–6
2003–04	Valletta	QR	(Switzerland) Neuchâtel Xamax	0–2	0–2	0–4
2004–05	Birkirkara	1QR	(Albania) Partizani	2–1	2–4	4–5
2004–05	Marsaxlokk	1QR	(Slovenia) Primorje	0–1	0–2	0–3
2005–06	Birkirkara	1QR	(Cyprus) APOEL	0–2	0–4	0–6
2005–06	Hibernians	1QR	(Cyprus) Omonia	0–3	0–3	0–6
2006–07	Sliema Wanderers	1QR	(Romania) Rapid București	0–1	0–5	0–6
2006–07	Hibernians	1QR	(Romania) Dinamo București	0–4	1–5	1–9
2007–08	Hibernians	1QR	(Serbia) Vojvodina	0–2	1–5	1–7
2007–08	Sliema Wanderers	1QR	(Bulgaria) Litex Lovech	0–3	0–4	0–7
2008–09	Birkirkara	1QR	(Croatia) Hajduk Split	0–3	0–4	0–7
2008–09	Marsaxlokk	1QR	(Croatia) Slaven Belupo	0–4	0–4	0–8
UEFA Europa League
2009–10	Birkirkara	1QR	(Croatia) Slaven Belupo	0–1	0–0	0–1
2009–10	Sliema Wanderers	2QR	(Israel) Maccabi Netanya	0–0	0–3	0–3
2009–10	Valletta	1QR	(Iceland) Keflavík	3–0	2–2	5–2
2009–10	Valletta	2QR	(Republic of Ireland) St Patrick's Athletic	0–1	1–1	1–2
2010–11	Sliema Wanderers	1QR	(Croatia) Šibenik	0–3	0–0	0–3
2010–11	Valletta	2QR	(Poland) Ruch Chorzów	1–1	0–0	1–1 (a)
2011–12	Birkirkara	1QR	(Albania) Vllaznia	0–1	1–1	1–2
2011–12	Floriana	2QR	(Cyprus) AEK Larnaca	0–8	0–1	0–9
2012–13	Birkirkara	1QR	(North Macedonia) Metalurg Skopje	2–2	0–0	2–2 (a)
2012–13	Floriana	1QR	(Sweden) Elfsborg	0–4	0–8	0–12
2012–13	Hibernians	1QR	(Bosnia and Herzegovina) Sarajevo	4–4	2–5	6–9
2013–14	Birkirkara	2QR	(Slovenia) Maribor	0–0	0–2	0–2
2013–14	Hibernians	1QR	(Serbia) Vojvodina	1–4	2–3	3–7
2013–14	Sliema Wanderers	1QR	(Azerbaijan) Khazar Lankaran	1–1	0–1	1–2
2013–14	Valletta	1QR	(San Marino) Fiorita	1–0	3–0	4–0
2013–14	Valletta	2QR	(Belarus) Minsk	1–1	0–2	1–3
2014–15	Birkirkara	1QR	(Hungary) Diósgyőr	1–2	1–4	2–6
2014–15	Hibernians	1QR	(Slovakia) Spartak Trnava	2–4	0–5	2–9
2014–15	Sliema Wanderers	1QR	(Hungary) Ferencváros	1–1	1–2	2–3
2015–16	Balzan	1QR	(Bosnia and Herzegovina) Željezničar	0–2	0–1	0–3
2015–16	Birkirkara	1QR	(Armenia) Ulisses	0–0	3–1	3–1
2015–16	Birkirkara	2QR	(England) West Ham	1–0	0–1	1–1 (3–5 p)
2015–16	Valletta	1QR	(Wales) Newtown	1–2	1–2	2–4
2016–17	Balzan	1QR	(Azerbaijan) Neftçi Baku	0–2	2–1	2–3
2016–17	Birkirkara	1QR	(Bosnia and Herzegovina) Široki Brijeg	2–0	1–1	3–1
2016–17	Birkirkara	2QR	(Scotland) Heart of Midlothian	0–0	2–1	2–1
2016–17	Birkirkara	3QR	(Russia) Krasnodar	0–3	1–3	1–6
2016–17	Hibernians	1QR	(Slovakia) Spartak Trnava	0–3	0–3	0–6
2017–18	Balzan	1QR	(Hungary) Videoton	3–3	0–2	3−5
2017–18	Floriana	1QR	(Serbia) Red Star Belgrade	3–3	0–3	3–6
2017–18	Valletta	1QR	(San Marino) Folgore	2–0	1–0	3–0
2017–18	Valletta	2QR	(Netherlands) FC Utrecht	0–0	1–3	1–3
2018–19	Balzan	1QR	(Azerbaijan) Keşla	4−1	1−2	5−3
2018–19	Balzan	2QR	(Slovakia) Slovan Bratislava	2–1	1−3	3−4
2018–19	Birkirkara	PR	(Faroe Islands) KÍ Klaksvík	1–1	1–2	2–3
2018–19	Gżira United	PR	(Andorra) Sant Julià	2–1	2–0	4–1
2018–19	Gżira United	1QR	(Serbia) Radnički Niš	0–1	0–4	0–5
2018–19	Valletta	2QR	(Bosnia and Herzegovina) Zrinjski Mostar	1–2	1–1	2–3
2019–20	Balzan	1QR	(Slovenia) Domžale	3–4	0–1	3–5
2019–20	Hibernians	1QR	(Belarus) Shakhtyor Soligorsk	0–1	0–1	0–2
2019–20	Gżira United	1QR	(Croatia) Hajduk Split	0–2	3–1	3–3 (a)
2019–20	Gżira United	2QR	(Latvia) Ventspils	2–2	0–4	2–6
2019–20	Valletta	3QR	(Kazakhstan) Astana	1–5	0–4	1–9
2020–21	Floriana	2QR	(Northern Ireland) Linfield	—N/a	1–0	—N/a
2020–21	Floriana	3QR	(Estonia) Flora	0–0 (2–4 p)	—N/a	—N/a
2020–21	Hibernians	1QR	(Liechtenstein) Vaduz	—N/a	2–0	—N/a
2020–21	Hibernians	2QR	(Hungary) Fehérvár	0–1	—N/a	—N/a
2020–21	Sirens	1QR	(Bulgaria) CSKA Sofia	—N/a	1−2	—N/a
2020–21	Valletta	1QR	(Wales) Bala Town	0–1	—N/a	—N/a
2025–26	Ħamrun Spartans	3QR	(Israel) Maccabi Tel Aviv	1–2	1–3	2–5

PR = Preliminary round; QR = Qualifying round; 1R/2R = First/Second round; 1QR/2QR/3QR = First/Second/Third qualifying round

=== UEFA Conference League ===
Season	Team	Round	Opponent	Home	Away	Aggregate
2021–22	Birkirkara	1QR	(San Marino) La Fiorita	1–0	1–1	2–1
2021–22	Birkirkara	2QR	(Slovenia) Olimpija Ljubljana	1–0	0–1	1–1 (4–5 p)
2021–22	Gżira United	1QR	(Andorra) Sant Julià	1–1 (a.e.t.)	0–0	1–1 (5–3 p)
2021–22	Gżira United	2QR	(Croatia) Rijeka	0–2	0–1	0–3
2021–22	Hibernians	2QR	(San Marino) Folgore	4–2	3–1	7–3
2021–22	Hibernians	3QR	(Latvia) Riga	1–4	1–0	2−4 (a.e.t.)
2021–22	Mosta	1QR	(Slovakia) Spartak Trnava	3–2	0–2	3–4
2022–23	Floriana	1QR	(Moldova) Petrocub Hîncești	0–0	0–1	0–1
2022–23	Gżira United	1QR	(Andorra) Atlètic Club d'Escaldes	1–1	1–0	2–1 (a.e.t.)
2022–23	Gżira United	2QR	(Serbia) Radnički Niš	2–2	3–3 (a.e.t.)	5–5 (3–1 p)
2022–23	Gżira United	3QR	(Austria) Wolfsberger AC	0–4	0–0	0–4
2022–23	Ħamrun Spartans	1QR	(Armenia) Alashkert	4–1	0–1	4–2
2022–23	Ħamrun Spartans	2QR	(Bosnia and Herzegovina) Velež Mostar	1–0	1–0	2–0
2022–23	Ħamrun Spartans	3QR	(Bulgaria) Levski Sofia	0–1	2–1 (a.e.t.)	2–2 (4–1 p)
2022–23	Ħamrun Spartans	PO	(Serbia) Partizan	3–3	1–4	4–7
2022–23	Hibernians	2QR	(Estonia) FCI Levadia	3–2	1–1	4–3
2022–23	Hibernians	3QR	(Latvia) RFS	1–3	1–1	2−4
2023–24	Balzan	1QR	(Slovenia) Domžale	1–3 (a.e.t.)	4–1	5–4
2023–24	Balzan	2QR	(Belarus) Neman Grodno	0–0	0–2	0–2
2023–24	Birkirkara	1QR	(Slovenia) Maribor	1–2	1–1	2–3
2023–24	Gżira United	1QR	(Northern Ireland) Glentoran	2–2	1–1 (a.e.t.)	3–3 (14–13 p)
2023–24	Gżira United	2QR	(Luxembourg) F91 Dudelange	2–0	1–2	3–2
2023–24	Gżira United	3QR	(Czech Republic) Viktoria Plzeň	0–2	0–4	0–6
2023–24	Ħamrun Spartans	2QR	(Georgia (country)) Dinamo Tbilisi	2–1	1–0	3–1
2023–24	Ħamrun Spartans	3QR	(Hungary) Ferencváros	1–6	1–2	2–8
2024–25	Floriana	1QR	(San Marino) Tre Penne	3–1	1–1	4–2
2024–25	Floriana	2QR	(Portugal) Vitória de Guimarães	0–1	0–4	0–5
2024–25	Marsaxlokk	1QR	(Albania) Partizani Tirana	1–2	1–1	2–3
2024–25	Sliema Wanderers	2QR	(Armenia) Noah	0–0	0–7	0–7
2024–25	Ħamrun Spartans	3QR	(Kosovo) Ballkani	0–2	0–0	0–2
2025–26	Birkirkara	1QR	(Moldova) Petrocub Hîncești	1–0	0–3	1–3
2025–26	Floriana	1QR	(Wales) Haverfordwest County	2–1	3–2	5–3
2025–26	Floriana	2QR	(Kosovo) Ballkani	2–4	1–1	3–5
2025–26	Hibernians	2QR	(Slovakia) Spartak Trnava	1–2	1–5	2–7
2025–26	Ħamrun Spartans	PO	(Latvia) RFS	1–0	2–2	3–2
2025–26	Ħamrun Spartans	LP	(Poland) Jagiellonia Białystok	—N/a	0–1	33rd place
2025–26	Ħamrun Spartans	LP	(Switzerland) Lausanne-Sport	0–1	—N/a	33rd place
2025–26	Ħamrun Spartans	LP	(Turkey) Samsunspor	—N/a	0–3	33rd place
2025–26	Ħamrun Spartans	LP	(Gibraltar) Lincoln Red Imps	3–1	—N/a	33rd place
2025–26	Ħamrun Spartans	LP	(Ukraine) Shakhtar Donetsk	0–2	—N/a	33rd place
2025–26	Ħamrun Spartans	LP	(Republic of Ireland) Shamrock Rovers	—N/a	1–3	33rd place
2026–27	Floriana	2QR	(Kosovo) Drita	1–1	1–2 (a.e.t.)	2–3
2026–27	Ħamrun Spartans	1QR	(Faroe Islands) NSÍ	1–2	1–1	2–3
2026–27	Marsaxlokk	1QR	(Armenia) Pyunik	0–3	0–1	0–4
2026–27	Valletta	2QR	(Poland) Raków Częstochowa	0–4	1–3	1–7

1QR/2QR/3QR = First/Second/Third qualifying round; PO = Play-off round; LP = League phase

== Defunct competitions ==
=== European Cup Winners' Cup / UEFA Cup Winners' Cup ===
Season	Team	Round	Opponent	Home	Away	Aggregate
European Cup Winners' Cup
1961–62	Floriana	PR	(Hungary) Újpest	2–5	2–10	4–15
1962–63	Hibernians	PR	(Greece) Olympiacos	w/o		—N/a
1962–63	Hibernians	1R	(Spain) Atlético Madrid	0–1	0–4	0–5
1963–64	Sliema Wanderers	PR	(Wales) Borough United	0–0	0–2	0–2
1964–65	Valletta	1R	(Spain) Real Zaragoza	0–3	1–5	1–8
1965–66	Floriana	1R	(West Germany) Borussia Dortmund	1–5	0–8	1–13
1966–67	Floriana	1R	(Netherlands) Sparta Rotterdam	1–1	0–6	1–7
1967–68	Floriana	1R	(Netherlands) NAC Breda	1–2	0–1	1–3
1968–69	Sliema Wanderers	1R	(Luxembourg) US Rumelange	1–0	1–2	2–2 (a)
1968–69	Sliema Wanderers	2R	(Denmark) Randers Freja	0–2	0–6	0–8
1969–70	Sliema Wanderers	1R	(Sweden) IFK Norrköping	1–0	1–5	2–5
1970–71	Hibernians	1R	(Spain) Real Madrid	0–0	0–5	1–7
1971–72	Hibernians	1R	(Romania) Steaua București	0–0	0–1	0–1
1972–73	Floriana	1R	(Hungary) Ferencvárosi	1–0	0–6	2–5
1973–74	Gżira United	1R	(Norway) Brann	0–2	0–7	0–9
1974–75	Sliema Wanderers	1R	(Finland) Reipas Lahti	2–0	1–4	3–4
1975–76	Valletta	1R	(Hungary) Haladás VSE	1–1	0–7	1–8
1976–77	Floriana	1R	(Poland) Śląsk Wrocław	1–4	0–2	1–6
1977–78	Valletta	1R	(Soviet Union) Dynamo Moscow	0–2	0–5	0–7
1978–79	Floriana	1R	(Italy) Inter Milan	1–3	0–5	1–8
1979–80	Sliema Wanderers	1R	(Portugal) Boavista	2–1	0–8	2–9
1981–82	Floriana	1R	(Belgium) Standard Liège	1–3	0–9	1–12
1982–83	Sliema Wanderers	1R	(Wales) Swansea City	0–5	0–12	0–17
1983–84	Valletta	1R	(Scotland) Rangers	0–8	0–10	0–18
1984–85	Ħamrun Spartans	1R	(Northern Ireland) Ballymena United	2–1	1–0	3–1
1984–85	Ħamrun Spartans	2R	(Soviet Union) Dynamo Moscow	0–1	0–5	0–6
1985–86	Żurrieq	1R	(West Germany) Bayer Uerdingen	0–3	0–9	0–12
1986–87	Żurrieq	1R	(Wales) Wrexham	0–3	0–4	0–7
1987–88	Sliema Wanderers	1R	(Albania) Vllaznia	0–4	0–2	0–6
1988–89	Floriana	1R	(Scotland) Dundee United	0–0	0–1	0–1
1989–90	Ħamrun Spartans	1R	(Spain) Real Valladolid	0–1	0–5	0–6
1990–91	Sliema Wanderers	1R	(Czechoslovakia) Dukla Prague	1–2	0–2	1–4
1992–93	Ħamrun Spartans	QR	(Slovenia) Maribor	2–1	0–4	2–5
1993–94	Sliema Wanderers	QR	(Sweden) Degerfors	1–3	0–3	1–6
UEFA Cup Winners' Cup
1994–95	Floriana	QR	(Republic of Ireland) Sligo Rovers	2–2	0–1	2–3
1995–96	Valletta	QR	(Slovakia) Inter Bratislava	0–0	2–5	2–5
1996–97	Valletta	QR	(Romania) Gloria Bistrița	1–2	1–2	2–4
1997–98	Hibernians	QR	(Iceland) ÍBV	0–1	0–3	0–4
1998–99	Hibernians	QR	(Poland) Amica Wronki	0–1	0–4	0–5

PR = Preliminary round; QR = Qualifying round; 1R/2R = First/Second round

=== UEFA Intertoto Cup ===
Although the tournament was founded in 1961–62, it was only taken over by UEFA in 1995.

Season	Team	Round	Opponent	Home	Away	Aggregate
1995	Floriana	GS	(Austria) Tirol Innsbruck	0–4	—N/a	5th
1995	Floriana	GS	(Israel) Hapoel Petah Tikva	—N/a	1–1	5th
1995	Floriana	GS	(France) Strasbourg	0–4	—N/a	5th
1995	Floriana	GS	(Turkey) Gençlerbirliği	—N/a	0–3	5th
1996	Hibernians	GS	(Russia) Uralmash	0–4	—N/a	5th
1996	Hibernians	GS	(Bulgaria) CSKA Sofia	—N/a	1–4	5th
1996	Hibernians	GS	(France) Strasbourg	0–2	—N/a	5th
1996	Hibernians	GS	(Turkey) Kocaelispor	—N/a	3–5	5th
1997	Floriana	GS	(Austria) SV Ried	1–2	—N/a	5th
1997	Floriana	GS	(Georgia (country)) Tbilisi	—N/a	0–5	5th
1997	Floriana	GS	(Russia) Torpedo Moscow	0–1	—N/a	5th
1997	Floriana	GS	(Greece) Iraklis	—N/a	0–1	5th
1998	Sliema Wanderers	1R	(Hungary) Diósgyőr	2–3	0–2	2–5
1999	Floriana	1R	(Wales) Aberystwyth Town	2–1	2–2	4–3
1999	Floriana	2R	(Finland) Jokerit	1–1	1–2	2–3
2000	Floriana	1R	(Norway) Stabæk	1–1	0–2	1–3
2001	Hibernians	1R	(Poland) Zagłębie Lubin	1–0	0–4	1–4
2002	Valletta	1R	(Albania) Teuta	1–2	0–0	1–2
2003	Hibernians	1R	(Finland) AC Allianssi	1–1	0–1	1–2
2004	Hibernians	1R	(Croatia) Slaven Belupo	2–1	0–3	2–4
2005	Valletta	1R	(Serbia and Montenegro) Budućnost Podgorica	0–5	2–2	2–7
2006	Marsaxlokk	1R	(Bosnia and Herzegovina) Zrinjski Mostar	1–1	0–3	1–4
2007	Birkirkara	1R	(Slovenia) Maribor	0–3	1–2	1–5
2008	Hibernians	1R	(Slovenia) Gorica	0–3	0–0	0–3

GS = Group stage; 1R/2R = First/Second round
