= 2026–27 UEFA Conference League qualifying =

Qualification phase of the 2026–27 UEFA Conference League

The 2026–27 UEFA Conference League qualifying phase and play-off round began on 7 July and ended on 27 August 2026.

A total of 153 teams competed in the qualifying system of the 2026–27 UEFA Conference League, which consisted of the qualifying phase and the play-off round. Of these, 20 teams entered through the Champions Path and 133 through the Main Path. The 24 winners of the play-off round advanced to the league phase, where they joined the 12 losers of the Europa League play-off round.

Times are CEST (UTC+2), as listed by UEFA (local times, if different, are in parentheses).

== Format ==
The qualifying phase and play-off round were split into two paths – the Champions Path and the Main Path. The Champions Path contained teams which were eliminated from the Champions League Champions Path and the Europa League Champions Path, and the Main Path contained teams which qualified through their domestic league or as domestic cup winners as well as teams eliminated from the Europa League Main Path.

Each tie was played over two legs, with each team playing one leg at home. The team that scored more goals on aggregate over the two legs advanced to the next round. If the aggregate score was level at the end of normal time of the second leg, extra time was played, and if the same number of goals was scored by both teams during extra time, the tie was decided by a penalty shoot-out.

In the draws for each round, teams were seeded based on their UEFA club coefficients at the beginning of the season, with the teams divided into seeded and unseeded pots containing the same number of teams. A seeded team was drawn against an unseeded team, with the order of legs in each tie decided by draw. As the identity of the winners of the previous round may not have been known at the time of the draws, the seeding was carried out under the assumption that the team with the higher coefficient of an undecided tie advanced to the subsequent round, which meant if the team with the lower coefficient advanced, it simply took the seeding of its opponent.

Prior to the draws, UEFA could form "groups" in accordance with the principles set by the Club Competitions Committee, purely for the convenience of the draw and not to resemble any real groupings in the sense of the competition. Teams from associations with political conflicts as decided by UEFA could not be drawn into the same tie. After the draws, the order of legs of a tie could be reversed by UEFA due to scheduling or venue conflicts.

== Schedule ==
The schedule of the competition was as follows. Matches were scheduled for Thursdays, though exceptionally could take place on Tuesdays or Wednesdays due to scheduling conflicts.

Schedule for 2026–27 UEFA Conference League
Round	Draw date	First leg	Second leg
First qualifying round	16 June 2026	9 July 2026	16 July 2026
Second qualifying round	17 June 2026	23 July 2026	30 July 2026
Third qualifying round	20 July 2026	6 August 2026	13 August 2026
Play-off round	3 August 2026	20 August 2026	27 August 2026

== Teams ==
=== Champions Path ===
The Champions Path included league champions which were eliminated from the Champions Path qualifying phase of the Champions League and the Champions Path qualifying phase of the Europa League and consisted of the following rounds:

- Second qualifying round (12 teams): 12 of the 14 losers of the Champions League first qualifying round (two of the teams received a bye to the third qualifying round).
- Third qualifying round (8 teams): 6 winners of the second qualifying round, and 2 losers of the Champions League first qualifying round that received a bye.
- Play-off round (10 teams): 4 winners of the third qualifying round, and 6 losers of the Europa League Champions Path third qualifying round.

Below were the participating teams of the Champions Path (with their 2026 UEFA club coefficients, not used as seeding for the Champions Path, however), grouped by their starting rounds.

Key to colours
Winners of play-off round advanced to league phase

Play-off round
Team	Coeff.
(Republic of Ireland) Shamrock Rovers	19.375
(Finland) KuPS	14.000
(Gibraltar) Lincoln Red Imps	13.500
(Iceland) Víkingur Reykjavík	11.750
(Faroe Islands) KÍ	10.500
(Northern Ireland) Larne	9.000

Third qualifying round
Team	Coeff.
(Andorra) Inter Club d'Escaldes	7.500
(San Marino) Tre Fiori	2.500

Second qualifying round
Team	Coeff.
(Kosovo) Drita	13.625
(Bosnia and Herzegovina) Borac Banja Luka	13.125
(Latvia) Riga	10.500
(Estonia) Flora	10.000
(Moldova) Petrocub Hîncești	9.000
(Wales) The New Saints	9.000
(Montenegro) Sutjeska	6.000
(Hungary) ETO Győr	5.437
(Malta) Floriana	4.000
(North Macedonia) Vardar	1.551
(Belarus) ML Vitebsk	1.325
(Luxembourg) Atert Bissen	1.325

Notes

1. ^{UEL CH Q3} Losers of Europa League third qualifying round (Champions Path).
2. ^{UCL Q1} Losers of Champions League first qualifying round.

=== Main Path ===
The Main Path included league non-champions and domestic cup winners and consisted of the following rounds:

- First qualifying round (52 teams): 52 teams which entered in this round.
- Second qualifying round (86 teams): 54 teams which entered in this round, 6 losers of the Europa League Main Path first qualifying round, and 26 winners of the first qualifying round.
- Third qualifying round (52 teams): 9 losers of the Europa League Main Path second qualifying round, and 43 winners of the second qualifying round.
- Play-off round (38 teams): 5 teams which entered this round, 7 losers of the Europa League Main Path third qualifying round, and 26 winners of the third qualifying round.

Below were the participating teams of the League Path (with their 2026 UEFA club coefficients), grouped by their starting rounds.

Key to colours
Winners of play-off round advanced to league phase

Play-off round
Team	Coeff.
(Italy) Atalanta	84.000
(Scotland) Rangers	59.250
(Germany) SC Freiburg	56.500
(France) Monaco	56.000
(Greece) PAOK	48.250
(Israel) Maccabi Tel Aviv	32.500
(Cyprus) Pafos	24.125
(England) Brighton & Hove Albion	23.903
(Spain) Getafe	19.409
(Scotland) Heart of Midlothian	11.500
(Czech Republic) Hradec Králové	9.705
(Poland) Górnik Zabrze	9.350

Third qualifying round
Team	Coeff.
(Denmark) Midtjylland	48.250
(Azerbaijan) Qarabağ	42.750
(Moldova) Sheriff Tiraspol	20.000
(Ukraine) Dynamo Kyiv	17.500
(Netherlands) Twente	13.585
(Croatia) Hajduk Split	10.000
(Norway) Tromsø	8.247
(Switzerland) St Gallen	6.940
(Sweden) Hammarby	6.000

Second qualifying round
Team	Coeff.
(Portugal) Braga	63.750
(Netherlands) Ajax	58.250
(Denmark) Copenhagen	54.375
(Belgium) Gent	39.000
(Austria) Rapid Wien	29.750
(Greece) Panathinaikos	29.250
(Bulgaria) Ludogorets Razgrad	28.750
(Romania) FCSB	25.500
(Poland) Raków Częstochowa	22.250
(Serbia) Partizan	22.000
(Switzerland) Lugano	21.250
(Cyprus) AEK Larnaca	20.250
(Turkey) İstanbul Başakşehir	19.500
(Croatia) Rijeka	18.625
(Romania) CFR Cluj	17.500
(Finland) HJK	14.000
(Bosnia and Herzegovina) Zrinjski Mostar	13.250
(Norway) Brann	12.250
(Armenia) Noah	10.750
(Slovakia) Spartak Trnava	10.500
(Czech Republic) Jablonec	9.705
Austria Wien	9.500
(Poland) GKS Katowice	9.350
(Liechtenstein) Vaduz	8.500
(Denmark) Nordsjælland	8.421
(Kazakhstan) Tobol	8.000
(Cyprus) Apollon Limassol	7.138
(Scotland) Hibernian	7.000
(Faroe Islands) HB	7.000
(Switzerland) Sion	6.940
(Lithuania) Panevėžys	6.500
(Azerbaijan) Neftçi	6.500
(Scotland) Motherwell	6.410
(Slovakia) DAC Dunajská Streda	6.000
(Sweden) GAIS	5.925
(Sweden) IFK Göteborg	5.925
(Croatia) Varaždin	5.631
(Israel) Beitar Jerusalem	5.500
(Slovakia) Žilina	5.500
(Serbia) Vojvodina	5.500
(Israel) Hapoel Tel Aviv	5.500
(Hungary) Paks	5.437
(Hungary) Debrecen	5.437
(Ukraine) Polissya Zhytomyr	5.182
(Ukraine) LNZ Cherkasy	5.182
(Serbia) Železničar Pančevo	5.150
(Romania) Universitatea Cluj	5.050
(Slovenia) Koper	4.893
(Slovenia) Bravo	4.893
(Slovenia) Aluminij	4.893
(Moldova) Zimbru Chișinău	4.500
(Iceland) Valur	4.500
(Latvia) Auda	4.500
(Bulgaria) CSKA 1948	4.212
(Republic of Ireland) Shelbourne	4.000
(Republic of Ireland) Derry City	4.000
(Iceland) Vestri	3.304
(Kosovo) Dukagjini	2.797
(Malta) Valletta	1.800
(Northern Ireland) Coleraine	1.450

First qualifying round
Team	Coeff.
(Latvia) RFS	12.500
(Kazakhstan) Astana	12.500
(Lithuania) Žalgiris	12.000
(North Macedonia) Shkëndija	10.875
(Kosovo) Ballkani	10.000
(Armenia) Pyunik	10.000
(Northern Ireland) Linfield	9.500
(Malta) Hamrun Spartans	8.500
(Moldova) Milsami Orhei	7.500
(Estonia) FCI Levadia	7.500
(Estonia) Paide Linnameeskond	7.500
(Luxembourg) Differdange 03	6.500
(Belarus) Dinamo Minsk	6.500
(Albania) Vllaznia	6.500
(Faroe Islands) Víkingur	6.000
(San Marino) La Fiorita	6.000
(Azerbaijan) Zira	5.500
(Montenegro) Dečić	5.500
(Georgia (country)) Dila Gori	5.500
(Belarus) BATE Borisov	5.500
(Bosnia and Herzegovina) Sarajevo	5.000
(Andorra) Atlètic Club d'Escaldes	5.000
(Gibraltar) St Joseph's	5.000
(Andorra) FC Santa Coloma	5.000
(Georgia (country)) Dinamo Tbilisi	5.000
(Armenia) Alashkert	5.000
(Georgia (country)) Torpedo Kutaisi	4.500
(Bosnia and Herzegovina) Velež Mostar	4.500
(San Marino) Virtus	4.000
(Latvia) Liepāja	4.000
(Finland) Ilves	3.500
(Wales) Connah's Quay Nomads	3.500
(Republic of Ireland) Bohemians	3.468
(Iceland) Stjarnan	3.304
(Gibraltar) Europa	3.000
(Finland) Inter Turku	2.800
(Kosovo) Malisheva	2.797
(Kazakhstan) Yelimay	2.750
(Albania) Dinamo City	2.500
(Luxembourg) UNA Strassen	2.500
(Lithuania) Hegelmann	2.000
(Wales) Penybont	2.000
(Faroe Islands) NSÍ	2.000
(North Macedonia) Sileks	2.000
(Montenegro) Mornar	2.000
(Northern Ireland) Glentoran	2.000
(Malta) Marsaxlokk	1.800
(Estonia) Nõmme Kalju	1.641
(Albania) Elbasani	1.625
(Wales) Caernarfon Town	1.500
(Luxembourg) Mondorf-les-Bains	1.325
(Montenegro) Petrovac	1.316

Notes

1. ^{UEL MP Q3} Losers of Europa League third qualifying round (Main Path).
2. ^{UEL MP Q2} Losers of Europa League second qualifying round (Main Path).
3. ^{UEL MP Q1} Losers of Europa League first qualifying round (Main Path).

== First qualifying round ==
The draw for the first qualifying round was held on 16 June 2026.

=== Seeding ===
A total of 52 teams played in the first qualifying round. Seeding of the teams was based on their 2026 UEFA club coefficients. Before the draw, UEFA allocated the teams into five groups: four groups of five seeded teams and five unseeded teams, and one group of six seeded teams and six unseeded teams, in accordance with the principles set by the Club Competitions Committee. UEFA pre-assigned numbers to the teams so that the draw could be conducted in one run for the four groups consisting of five seeded and five unseeded teams each. The remaining group, consisting of six seeded and six unseeded teams, was drawn separately. The team represented by the ball drawn first was designated as the home team for the first leg.

Main Path
Group 1		Group 2		Group 3	
Seeded	Unseeded	Seeded	Unseeded	Seeded	Unseeded
(Lithuania) Žalgiris (2); (Moldova) Milsami Orhei (1); (Azerbaijan) Zira (3); (Belarus) BATE Borisov (5); (Armenia) Alashkert (4)	(Georgia (country)) Torpedo Kutaisi (6); (Bosnia and Herzegovina) Velež Mostar (7); (Kazakhstan) Yelimay (8); (Albania) Elbasani (9); (Montenegro) Petrovac (10)	(Latvia) RFS (5); (Estonia) FCI Levadia (2); (Luxembourg) Differdange 03 (3); (Faroe Islands) Víkingur (4); (Gibraltar) St Joseph's (1)	(Finland) Ilves (6); (Republic of Ireland) Bohemians (7); (Iceland) Stjarnan (8); (Northern Ireland) Glentoran (9); (Wales) Caernarfon Town (10)	(Kazakhstan) Astana (1); (Armenia) Pyunik (2); (Belarus) Dinamo Minsk (3); (Georgia (country)) Dila Gori (4); (Andorra) Atlètic Club d'Escaldes (5)	(San Marino) Virtus (8); (Albania) Dinamo City (7); (North Macedonia) Sileks (6); (Montenegro) Mornar (9); (Malta) Marsaxlokk (10)
Group 4		Group 5			
Seeded	Unseeded	Seeded	Unseeded		
(Kosovo) Ballkani (1); (Estonia) Paide Linnameeskond (2); (Montenegro) Dečić (3); (Bosnia and Herzegovina) Sarajevo (4); (Georgia (country)) Dinamo Tbilisi (5)	(Latvia) Liepāja (6); (Wales) Connah's Quay Nomads (7); (Finland) Inter Turku (8); (Lithuania) Hegelmann (10); (Luxembourg) Mondorf-les-Bains (9)	(North Macedonia) Shkëndija (1); (Northern Ireland) Linfield (2); (Malta) Hamrun Spartans (3); (Albania) Vllaznia (4); (San Marino) La Fiorita (5); (Andorra) FC Santa Coloma (6)	(Gibraltar) Europa (7); (Kosovo) Malisheva (8); (Luxembourg) UNA Strassen (9); (Wales) Penybont (10); (Faroe Islands) NSÍ (11); (Estonia) Nõmme Kalju (12)		

=== Summary ===
The first legs were played on 7, 8 and 9 July, and the second legs were played on 14, 15 and 16 July 2026.

The winners of the ties advanced to the second qualifying round.

First qualifying round
Team 1	Agg.	Team 2	1st leg	2nd leg
Velež Mostar (Bosnia and Herzegovina)	2–1	(Moldova) Milsami Orhei	1–1	1–0
Bohemians (Republic of Ireland)	2–0	(Gibraltar) St Joseph's	2–0	0–0
Dinamo City (Albania)	4–2	(Kazakhstan) Astana	0–1	4–1 (a.e.t.)
Connah's Quay Nomads (Wales)	2–3	(Kosovo) Ballkani	0–0	2–3
Zira (Azerbaijan)	6–0	(Georgia (country)) Torpedo Kutaisi	3–0	3–0
Differdange 03 (Luxembourg)	1–3	(Finland) Ilves	0–0	1–3
Dinamo Minsk (Belarus)	1–1 (6–5 p)	(North Macedonia) Sileks	0–1	1–0 (a.e.t.)
Liepāja (Latvia)	3–1 (Note: Order of legs reversed after original draw.)	(Montenegro) Dečić	1–0	2–1
Elbasani (Albania)	1–1 (4–5 p)	(Belarus) BATE Borisov	1–1	0–0 (a.e.t.)
Glentoran (Northern Ireland)	1–4	(Latvia) RFS	1–2	0–2
Atlètic Club d'Escaldes (Andorra)	4–2	(Montenegro) Mornar	2–1	2–1
Mondorf-les-Bains (Luxembourg)	2–3	(Georgia (country)) Dinamo Tbilisi	1–2	1–1 (a.e.t.)
Petrovac (Montenegro)	2–5	(Lithuania) Žalgiris	1–3	1–2
Caernarfon Town (Wales)	0–10	(Estonia) FCI Levadia	0–5	0–5
Marsaxlokk (Malta)	0–4	(Armenia) Pyunik	0–3	0–1
Hegelmann (Lithuania)	1–4	(Estonia) Paide Linnameeskond	1–1	0–3
Alashkert (Armenia)	3–3 (6–5 p)	(Kazakhstan) Yelimay	1–1	2–2 (a.e.t.)
Stjarnan (Iceland)	5–3	(Faroe Islands) Víkingur	3–1	2–2
Dila Gori (Georgia (country))	3–2	(San Marino) Virtus	3–1	0–1
Sarajevo (Bosnia and Herzegovina)	2–3	(Finland) Inter Turku	1–1	1–2
Europa (Gibraltar)	0–6	(North Macedonia) Shkëndija	0–5	0–1
Nõmme Kalju (Estonia)	3–2	(Northern Ireland) Linfield	1–0	2–2
Penybont (Wales)	0–4	(Andorra) FC Santa Coloma	0–1	0–3
NSÍ (Faroe Islands)	3–2	(Malta) Hamrun Spartans	1–1	2–1
UNA Strassen (Luxembourg)	3–0	(San Marino) La Fiorita	1–0	2–0
Vllaznia (Albania)	2–6	(Kosovo) Malisheva	2–1	0–5

== Second qualifying round ==
The draw for the second qualifying round was held on 17 June 2026.

=== Seeding ===
A total of 98 teams played in the second qualifying round: 12 in the Champions Path and 86 in the Main Path. Seeding of the teams was based on their 2026 UEFA club coefficients. For the winners of the first qualifying round, whose identity was not known at the time of the draw, the club coefficient of the highest-ranked remaining team in each tie was used. For the losers of the Champions League first qualifying round and the Europa League first qualifying round, the club coefficient of the lower-ranked team in each tie was used. Before the draw, UEFA divided the teams and/or pairings into groups in accordance with the principles set by the Club Competitions Committee. In the Champions Path, the 12 pairings were divided into two groups, each containing three seeded and three unseeded pairings. In the Main Path, the 86 teams and/or pairings were divided into nine groups: seven groups of ten and two groups of eight, each with an equal number of seeded and unseeded teams and/or pairings. For the Main Path draw, the entries in each group were randomly assigned numbers so that the draw could be conducted in two runs: one for Groups 1 to 7, in which seeded entries were assigned numbers 1 to 5 and unseeded entries numbers 6 to 10, and one for Groups 8 and 9, in which seeded entries were assigned numbers 1 to 4 and unseeded entries numbers 5 to 8. The team or pairing represented by the ball drawn first was designated as the home team for the first leg.

Champions Path
Group 1		Group 2	
Seeded	Unseeded	Seeded	Unseeded
(Bosnia and Herzegovina) Borac Banja Luka; (Montenegro) Sutjeska; (Hungary) ETO Győr	(Moldova) Petrocub Hîncești; (Belarus) ML Vitebsk; (Luxembourg) Atert Bissen	(Latvia) Riga; (Wales) The New Saints; (Kosovo) Drita	(Estonia) Flora; (Malta) Floriana; (North Macedonia) Vardar

Main Path
Group 1		Group 2		Group 3	
Seeded	Unseeded	Seeded	Unseeded	Seeded	Unseeded
(Greece) Panathinaikos (1); (Croatia) Rijeka (2); (North Macedonia) Shkëndija (3); Austria Wien (4); (Bosnia and Herzegovina) Velež Mostar (5)	(Slovakia) DAC Dunajská Streda (6); (Latvia) Liepāja (7); (Hungary) Paks (8); (Slovenia) Bravo (9); (Republic of Ireland) Derry City (10)	(Portugal) Braga (1); (Turkey) İstanbul Başakşehir (2); (Norway) Brann (3); (Armenia) Pyunik (4); (Switzerland) Sion (5)	(Belarus) BATE Borisov (6); (Hungary) Debrecen (7); (Serbia) Železničar Pančevo (8); (Romania) Universitatea Cluj (9); (Finland) Inter Turku (10)	(Netherlands) Ajax (1); (Switzerland) Lugano (2); (Estonia) Nõmme Kalju (3); (Denmark) Nordsjælland (4); (Finland) Ilves (5)	(Iceland) Stjarnan (6); (Sweden) GAIS (7); (Serbia) Vojvodina (8); (Republic of Ireland) Shelbourne (9); (Kosovo) Dukagjini (10)
Group 4		Group 5		Group 6	
Seeded	Unseeded	Seeded	Unseeded	Seeded	Unseeded
(Denmark) Copenhagen (1); (Finland) HJK (2); (Bosnia and Herzegovina) Zrinjski Mostar (3); (Estonia) FCI Levadia (4); (Faroe Islands) HB (5)	(Scotland) Motherwell (6); (Sweden) IFK Göteborg (7); (Ukraine) Polissya Zhytomyr (8); (Iceland) Valur (9); (Northern Ireland) Coleraine (10)	(Belgium) Gent (1); (Romania) FCSB (2); (Armenia) Noah (3); (Poland) GKS Katowice (4); (Kazakhstan) Tobol (5)	(Lithuania) Panevėžys (6); (Slovakia) Žilina (7); (Ukraine) LNZ Cherkasy (8); (Moldova) Zimbru Chișinău (9); (Latvia) Auda (10)	(Austria) Rapid Wien (1); (Latvia) RFS (2); (Lithuania) Žalgiris (3); (Czech Republic) Jablonec (4); (Scotland) Hibernian (5)	(Kosovo) Malisheva (6); (Croatia) Varaždin (7); (Andorra) FC Santa Coloma (8); (Georgia (country)) Dinamo Tbilisi (9); (Iceland) Vestri (10)
Group 7		Group 8		Group 9	
Seeded	Unseeded	Seeded	Unseeded	Seeded	Unseeded
(Bulgaria) Ludogorets Razgrad (1); (Poland) Raków Częstochowa (2); (Albania) Dinamo City (3); (Cyprus) Apollon Limassol (4); (Belarus) Dinamo Minsk (5)	(Azerbaijan) Neftçi (6); (Georgia (country)) Dila Gori (7); (Israel) Hapoel Tel Aviv (8); (Slovenia) Aluminij (9); (Malta) Valletta (10)	(Cyprus) AEK Larnaca (1); (Romania) CFR Cluj (2); (Slovakia) Spartak Trnava (3); (Estonia) Paide Linnameeskond (4)	(Israel) Beitar Jerusalem (5); (Azerbaijan) Zira (6); (Armenia) Alashkert (7); (Bulgaria) CSKA 1948 (8)	(Serbia) Partizan (1); (Kosovo) Ballkani (2); (Faroe Islands) NSÍ (3); (Liechtenstein) Vaduz (4)	(Luxembourg) UNA Strassen (5); (Andorra) Atlètic Club d'Escaldes (6); (Republic of Ireland) Bohemians (7); (Slovenia) Koper (8)

Notes

1. ^{†} Losers of the Champions League first qualifying round, whose identity was not known at the time of draw. Teams in italics lost to a team with a lower coefficient, thus effectively taking the coefficient of their opponent in the draw.
2. ^{††} Winners of the first qualifying round, whose identity was not known at the time of draw. Teams in italics defeated a team with a higher coefficient, thus effectively taking the coefficient of their opponent in the draw.
3. ^{†††} Losers of the Europa League first qualifying round, whose identity was not known at the time of draw. Teams in italics lost to a team with a lower coefficient, thus effectively taking the coefficient of their opponent in the draw.
4. ^{‡} Following the exclusion of Karviná from UEFA Europa League and the subsequent adjustment of the Czech clubs' access places, Hradec Králové was moved to the UEFA Europa League second qualifying round and was replaced by Jablonec. Jablonec therefore effectively inherited the seeded status associated with Hradec Králové's place in the draw.

=== Summary ===
The first legs were played on 21, 22 and 23 July, and the second legs were played on 28, 29 and 30 July 2026.

The winners of the ties advanced to the third qualifying round.

Second qualifying round
Team 1	Agg.	Team 2	1st leg	2nd leg
Champions Path
Tre Fiori (San Marino)	Bye	N/A	—	—
Inter Club d'Escaldes (Andorra)	Bye	N/A	—	—
Borac Banja Luka (Bosnia and Herzegovina)	6–3	(Moldova) Petrocub Hîncești	3–0	3–3
Atert Bissen (Luxembourg)	3–7	(Hungary) ETO Győr	2–6	1–1
ML Vitebsk (Belarus)	5–1	(Montenegro) Sutjeska	3–0	2–1
Flora (Estonia)	1–1 (4–2 p)	(Wales) The New Saints	1–0	0–1 (a.e.t.)
Floriana (Malta)	2–3	(Kosovo) Drita	1–1	1–2 (a.e.t.)
Vardar (North Macedonia)	4–8	(Latvia) Riga	2–3	2–5 (a.e.t.)
Main Path
Rijeka (Croatia)	2–0	(Republic of Ireland) Derry City	1–0	1–0
İstanbul Başakşehir (Turkey)	1–3	(Finland) Inter Turku	1–1	0–2
Lugano (Switzerland)	6–1	(Kosovo) Dukagjini	1–0	5–1
HJK (Finland)	8–0	(Northern Ireland) Coleraine	5–0	3–0
FCSB (Romania)	3–7	(Latvia) Auda	2–3	1–4
RFS (Latvia)	5–2	(Iceland) Vestri	4–1	1–1
Raków Częstochowa (Poland)	7–1	(Malta) Valletta	3–1	4–0
Liepāja (Latvia)	1–5	Austria Wien	0–2	1–3
Debrecen (Hungary)	1–0	(Armenia) Pyunik	1–0	0–0
GAIS (Sweden)	1–6	(Denmark) Nordsjælland	1–0	0–6
IFK Göteborg (Sweden)	4–3	(Estonia) FCI Levadia	1–2	3–1 (a.e.t.)
Žilina (Slovakia)	3–4	(Poland) GKS Katowice	2–1	1–3
Varaždin (Croatia)	3–4	(Czech Republic) Jablonec	3–2	0–2
Dila Gori (Georgia (country))	0–7	(Cyprus) Apollon Limassol	0–4	0–3
Bravo (Slovenia)	3–4	(North Macedonia) Shkëndija	2–1	1–3
Universitatea Cluj (Romania)	3–5	(Norway) Brann	2–2	1–3
Shelbourne (Republic of Ireland)	6–4	(Estonia) Nõmme Kalju	5–2	1–2
Valur (Iceland)	3–2	(Bosnia and Herzegovina) Zrinjski Mostar	1–0	2–2
Zimbru Chișinău (Moldova)	2–3	(Armenia) Noah	1–1	1–2
Dinamo Tbilisi (Georgia (country))	5–7	(Lithuania) Žalgiris	3–0	2–7
Aluminij (Slovenia)	1–4	(Albania) Dinamo City	1–1	0–3
DAC Dunajská Streda (Slovakia)	4–0	(Bosnia and Herzegovina) Velež Mostar	1–0	3–0
BATE Borisov (Belarus)	1–5	(Switzerland) Sion	1–1	0–4
Stjarnan (Iceland)	2–2 (4–5 p)	(Finland) Ilves	1–0	1–2 (a.e.t.)
Motherwell (Scotland)	5–0	(Faroe Islands) HB	2–0	3–0
Panevėžys (Lithuania)	2–2 (2–3 p)	(Kazakhstan) Tobol	1–1	1–1 (a.e.t.)
Malisheva (Kosovo)	3–4	(Scotland) Hibernian	2–0	1–4
Neftçi (Azerbaijan)	3–4	(Belarus) Dinamo Minsk	2–4	1–0
Paks (Hungary)	3–4	(Greece) Panathinaikos	1–2	2–2
Železničar Pančevo (Serbia)	0–5	(Portugal) Braga	0–1	0–4
Vojvodina (Serbia)	2–8	(Netherlands) Ajax	1–4	1–4
Polissya Zhytomyr (Ukraine)	4–5	(Denmark) Copenhagen	3–3	1–2
LNZ Cherkasy (Ukraine)	0–0 (2–4 p)	(Belgium) Gent	0–0	0–0 (a.e.t.)
FC Santa Coloma (Andorra)	3–9	(Austria) Rapid Wien	1–3	2–6
Hapoel Tel Aviv (Israel)	4–2	(Bulgaria) Ludogorets Razgrad	2–0	2–2
Alashkert (Armenia)	1–4	(Romania) CFR Cluj	1–1	0–3
Bohemians (Republic of Ireland)	4–4 (5–4 p)	(Kosovo) Ballkani	2–1	2–3 (a.e.t.)
Paide Linnameeskond (Estonia)	2–1	(Azerbaijan) Zira	1–0	1–1
Vaduz (Liechtenstein)	6–0	(Andorra) Atlètic Club d'Escaldes	4–0	2–0
Spartak Trnava (Slovakia)	0–0 (3–5 p)	(Bulgaria) CSKA 1948	0–0	0–0 (a.e.t.)
NSÍ (Faroe Islands)	3–3 (4–3 p)	(Slovenia) Koper	0–2	3–1 (a.e.t.)
AEK Larnaca (Cyprus)	3–3 (3–4 p)	(Israel) Beitar Jerusalem	0–1	3–2 (a.e.t.)
Partizan (Serbia)	5–0	(Luxembourg) UNA Strassen	4–0	1–0

== Third qualifying round ==
The draw for the third qualifying round was held on 20 July 2026.

=== Seeding ===
A total of 60 teams played in the third qualifying round: eight in the Champions Path and 52 in the Main Path. Seeding of the teams was based on their 2026 UEFA club coefficients. For the winners of the second qualifying round, whose identity was not known at the time of the draw, the club coefficient of the highest-ranked team in each tie was used. For the losers of the Europa League second qualifying round, the club coefficient of the lower-ranked team in each tie was used. Before the draw, UEFA divided the teams and/or pairings into groups in accordance with the principles set by the Club Competitions Committee. In the Champions Path, the eight teams and/or pairings were divided into two groups of four, each containing two seeded and two unseeded entries. In the Main Path, the 52 teams and/or pairings were divided into six groups: four groups of eight and two groups of ten, each with an equal number of seeded and unseeded entries. For the Main Path draw, the entries in each group were randomly assigned numbers so that the draw could be conducted in two runs: one for Groups 1 to 4, in which seeded entries were assigned numbers 1 to 4 and unseeded entries numbers 5 to 8, and one for Groups 5 and 6, in which seeded entries were assigned numbers 1 to 5 and unseeded entries numbers 6 to 10. In each tie, the team or pairing represented by the ball drawn first was designated as the home team for the first leg.

Champions Path
Group 1		Group 2	
Seeded	Unseeded	Seeded	Unseeded
(Kosovo) Drita; (Bosnia and Herzegovina) Borac Banja Luka	(Belarus) ML Vitebsk; (San Marino) Tre Fiori	(Latvia) Riga; (Estonia) Flora	(Andorra) Inter Club d'Escaldes; (Hungary) ETO Győr

Main Path
Group 1		Group 2		Group 3	
Seeded	Unseeded	Seeded	Unseeded	Seeded	Unseeded
(Netherlands) Ajax (1); (Finland) Inter Turku (2); (Romania) CFR Cluj (3); (Iceland) Valur (4)	(Liechtenstein) Vaduz (5); (Denmark) Nordsjælland (6); (Norway) Tromsø (7); (Republic of Ireland) Shelbourne (8)	(Latvia) Auda (1); (Moldova) Sheriff Tiraspol (4); (Ukraine) Dynamo Kyiv (3); (Lithuania) Žalgiris (2)	(Croatia) Hajduk Split (5); (Switzerland) St. Gallen (6); (Azerbaijan) Qarabağ (7); (Albania) Dinamo City (8)	(Israel) Hapoel Tel Aviv (4); (Serbia) Partizan (2); (Norway) Brann (3); (Armenia) Noah (1)	(Poland) GKS Katowice (6); (Kazakhstan) Tobol (5); (Cyprus) Apollon Limassol (7); (Switzerland) Sion (8)
Group 4		Group 5		Group 6	
Seeded	Unseeded	Seeded	Unseeded	Seeded	Unseeded
(Portugal) Braga (1); (Greece) Panathinaikos (2); (Switzerland) Lugano (3); (Israel) Beitar Jerusalem (4)	(Bulgaria) CSKA 1948 (5); Austria Wien (6); (Belarus) Dinamo Minsk (8); (Faroe Islands) NSÍ (7)	(Denmark) Copenhagen (5); (Austria) Rapid Wien (2); (Poland) Raków Częstochowa (3); (Croatia) Rijeka (4); (North Macedonia) Shkëndija (1)	(Hungary) Debrecen (6); (Estonia) Paide Linnameeskond (7); (Scotland) Hibernian (8); (Sweden) Hammarby (9); (Finland) Ilves (10)	(Belgium) Gent (1); (Denmark) Midtjylland (2); (Finland) HJK (3); (Netherlands) Twente (4); (Latvia) RFS (5)	(Republic of Ireland) Bohemians (7); (Czech Republic) Jablonec (6); (Sweden) IFK Göteborg (8); (Scotland) Motherwell (9); (Slovakia) DAC Dunajská Streda (10)

Notes

1. ^{†} Winners of the second qualifying round, whose identity was not known at the time of draw. Teams in italics defeated a team with a higher coefficient, thus effectively taking the coefficient of their opponent in the draw.
2. ^{††} Losers of the Europa League second qualifying round, whose identity was not known at the time of draw. Teams in italics lost to a team with a lower coefficient, thus effectively taking the coefficient of their opponent in the draw.

=== Summary ===
The first legs were played on 4, 5 and 6 August, and the second legs were played on 11, 12 and 13 August 2026.

The winners of the ties advanced to the play-off round.

Third qualifying round
Team 1	Agg.	Team 2	1st leg	2nd leg
Champions Path
Tre Fiori (San Marino)	1–9	(Kosovo) Drita	1–4	0–5
Borac Banja Luka (Bosnia and Herzegovina)	2–2 (4–2 p)	(Belarus) ML Vitebsk	1–0	1–2 (a.e.t.)
Inter Club d'Escaldes (Andorra)	6–0 (Note: Order of legs reversed after original draw.)	(Estonia) Flora	2–0	4–0
Riga (Latvia)	2–1	(Hungary) ETO Győr	1–0	1–1
Main Path
Inter Turku (Finland)	4–3	(Liechtenstein) Vaduz	2–1	2–2
Žalgiris (Lithuania)	2–9	(Croatia) Hajduk Split	2–5	0–4
Partizan (Serbia)	5–1	(Kazakhstan) Tobol	3–0	2–1
Panathinaikos (Greece)	3–2	(Bulgaria) CSKA 1948	1–1	2–1 (a.e.t.)
Ajax (Netherlands)	5–3	(Republic of Ireland) Shelbourne	3–1	2–2
Auda (Latvia)	1–4	(Albania) Dinamo City	1–0	0–4
Noah (Armenia)	3–4	(Switzerland) Sion	2–2	1–2
Braga (Portugal)	1–0	(Belarus) Dinamo Minsk	1–0	0–0
Valur (Iceland)	0–7	(Denmark) Nordsjælland	0–2	0–5
Sheriff Tiraspol (Moldova)	2–8	(Switzerland) St. Gallen	1–3	1–5
Hapoel Tel Aviv (Israel)	3–2	(Poland) GKS Katowice	2–0	1–2
Beitar Jerusalem (Israel)	3–3 (2–4 p)	Austria Wien	1–2	2–1 (a.e.t.)
CFR Cluj (Romania)	1–7	(Norway) Tromsø	0–5	1–2
Dynamo Kyiv (Ukraine)	1–2	(Azerbaijan) Qarabağ	1–0	0–2
Brann (Norway)	4–3	(Cyprus) Apollon Limassol	0–1	4–2 (a.e.t.)
Lugano (Switzerland)	4–2	(Faroe Islands) NSÍ	2–0	2–2
Raków Częstochowa (Poland)	1–0	(Sweden) Hammarby IF	0–0	1–0
HJK (Finland)	1–3	(Scotland) Motherwell	1–1	0–2
Hibernian (Scotland)	2–1	(North Macedonia) Shkëndija	2–1	0–0
IFK Göteborg (Sweden)	1–2	(Belgium) Gent	0–1	1–1
Paide Linnameeskond (Estonia)	1–6	(Austria) Rapid Wien	1–4	0–2
Bohemians (Republic of Ireland)	2–5	(Denmark) Midtjylland	0–2	2–3
Debrecen (Hungary)	1–8	(Denmark) Copenhagen	0–3	1–5
Jablonec (Czech Republic)	4–1	(Latvia) RFS	2–0	2–1
Rijeka (Croatia)	2–1	(Finland) Ilves	1–0	1–1
Twente (Netherlands)	9–3	(Slovakia) DAC Dunajská Streda	6–0	3–3

== Play-off round ==
The draw for the play-off round was held on 3 August 2026.

=== Seeding ===
A total of 48 teams played in the play-off round: ten in the Champions Path and 38 in the Main Path. Seeding of the teams was based on their 2026 UEFA club coefficients. For the winners of the third qualifying round, whose identity was not known at the time of the draw, the club coefficient of the highest-ranked team in each tie was used. For the losers of the Europa League third qualifying round, the club coefficient of the lower-ranked team in each tie was used. Before the draw, UEFA divided the teams and/or pairings into groups in accordance with the principles set by the Club Competitions Committee. In the Champions Path, the ten pairings were divided into one group of four and one group of six, each containing an equal number of seeded and unseeded pairings. In the Main Path, the 38 teams and/or pairings were divided into three groups of ten and one group of eight, each with an equal number of seeded and unseeded entries. For the Main Path draw, the entries in each group were randomly assigned numbers so that the draw could be conducted in two runs: one for Groups 1 to 3, in which seeded entries were assigned numbers 1 to 5 and unseeded entries numbers 6 to 10, and one for Group 4, in which seeded entries were assigned numbers 1 to 4 and unseeded entries numbers 5 to 8. In each tie, the team or pairing represented by the ball drawn first was designated as the home team for the first leg.

Champions Path
Group 1		Group 2	
Seeded	Unseeded	Seeded	Unseeded
(Bosnia and Herzegovina) Borac Banja Luka; (Finland) KuPS	(Iceland) Víkingur Reykjavík; (Republic of Ireland) Shamrock Rovers	(Kosovo) Drita; (Gibraltar) Lincoln Red Imps; (Latvia) Riga	(Faroe Islands) KÍ; (Andorra) Inter Club d'Escaldes; (Northern Ireland) Larne

Main Path
Group 1		Group 2	
Seeded	Unseeded	Seeded	Unseeded
(Italy) Atalanta (1); (Germany) SC Freiburg (2); (Austria) Rapid Wien (4); (Greece) Panathinaikos (3); (Switzerland) St. Gallen (5)	(Scotland) Motherwell (9); (Scotland) Heart of Midlothian (7); (Czech Republic) Hradec Králové (8); (Israel) Hapoel Tel Aviv (6); (Denmark) Nordsjælland (10)	(France) Monaco (2); (Denmark) Midtjylland (1); (Belgium) Gent (3); (England) Brighton & Hove Albion (4); (Cyprus) Pafos (5)	(Croatia) Rijeka (6); (Norway) Tromsø (7); (Scotland) Hibernian (8); (Poland) Górnik Zabrze (9); (Albania) Dinamo City (10)
Group 3		Group 4	
Seeded	Unseeded	Seeded	Unseeded
(Netherlands) Ajax (5); (Denmark) Copenhagen (2); (Greece) PAOK (3); (Poland) Raków Częstochowa (4); (Scotland) Rangers (1)	(Czech Republic) Jablonec (6); (Norway) Brann (8); (Croatia) Hajduk Split (7); (Switzerland) Sion (10); (Finland) Inter Turku (9)	(Portugal) Braga (1); (Azerbaijan) Qarabağ (2); (Serbia) Partizan (3); (Switzerland) Lugano (4)	(Spain) Getafe (5); (Netherlands) Twente (6); Austria Wien (7); (Israel) Maccabi Tel Aviv (8)

Notes

1. ^{†} Winners of the third qualifying round, whose identity was not known at the time of the draw. Teams in italics defeated a team with a higher coefficient, thus effectively taking the coefficient of their opponent in the draw.
2. ^{††} Losers of the Europa League third qualifying round, whose identity was not known at the time of the draw. Teams in italics lost to a team with a lower coefficient, thus effectively taking the coefficient of their opponent in the draw.

=== Summary ===
The first legs were played on 20 August, and the second legs were played on 26 and 27 August 2026.

The winners of the ties advanced to the league phase.

Play-off round
Team 1	Agg.	Team 2	1st leg	2nd leg
Champions Path
Víkingur Reykjavík (Iceland)	2–6	(Bosnia and Herzegovina) Borac Banja Luka	1–3	1–3
Shamrock Rovers (Republic of Ireland)	1–2	(Finland) KuPS	1–1	0–1
Drita (Kosovo)	2–2 (2–4 p)	(Andorra) Inter Club d'Escaldes	2–2	0–0 (a.e.t.)
KÍ (Faroe Islands)	1–2	(Latvia) Riga	0–0	1–2
Lincoln Red Imps (Gibraltar)	3–2	(Northern Ireland) Larne	0–2	3–0 (a.e.t.)
Main Path
Motherwell (Scotland)	2–7	(Germany) SC Freiburg	1–3	1–4
Górnik Zabrze (Poland)	3–7	(France) Monaco	2–3	1–4
Inter Turku (Finland)	1–4	(Denmark) Copenhagen	0–0	1–4
Heart of Midlothian (Scotland)	4–4 (4–3 p)	(Austria) Rapid Wien	2–2	2–2 (a.e.t.)
Tromsø (Norway)	0–4	(England) Brighton & Hove Albion	0–0	0–4
Hajduk Split (Croatia)	5–4	(Poland) Raków Częstochowa	2–2	3–2 (a.e.t.)
Panathinaikos (Greece)	4–3	(Czech Republic) Hradec Králové	2–2	2–1 (a.e.t.)
Gent (Belgium)	3–2	(Scotland) Hibernian	0–0	3–2
PAOK (Greece)	3–4	(Norway) Brann	1–1	2–3
Atalanta (Italy)	1–0	(Israel) Hapoel Tel Aviv	0–0	1–0
Midtjylland (Denmark)	6–1	(Croatia) Rijeka	2–0	4–1
Rangers (Scotland)	1–1 (3–4 p)	(Czech Republic) Jablonec	1–0	0–1 (a.e.t.)
Nordsjælland (Denmark)	4–2	(Switzerland) St. Gallen	1–0	3–2
Dinamo City (Albania)	3–5	(Cyprus) Pafos	1–1	2–4 (a.e.t.)
Sion (Switzerland)	5–9	(Netherlands) Ajax	2–4	3–5
Braga (Portugal)	2–0	Austria Wien	2–0	0–0
Twente (Netherlands)	4–2	(Azerbaijan) Qarabağ	0–1	4–1 (a.e.t.)
Getafe (Spain)	4–3	(Serbia) Partizan	3–1	1–2
Lugano (Switzerland)	3–2	(Israel) Maccabi Tel Aviv	2–1	1–1
