= 2026–27 UEFA Conference League qualifying (first and second round matches) =

European football qualifying matches for the 2026–27 UEFA Conference League

This page summarises the matches of the first and second qualifying rounds of 2026–27 UEFA Conference League qualifying.

Times are CEST (UTC+2), as listed by UEFA (local times, if different, are in parentheses).

== First qualifying round ==
=== Summary ===
The first legs were played on 7, 8 and 9 July, and the second legs were played on 14, 15 and 16 July 2026.

The winners of the ties advanced to the second qualifying round.

First qualifying round
Team 1	Agg.	Team 2	1st leg	2nd leg
Velež Mostar (Bosnia and Herzegovina)	2–1	(Moldova) Milsami Orhei	1–1	1–0
Bohemians (Republic of Ireland)	2–0	(Gibraltar) St Joseph's	2–0	0–0
Dinamo City (Albania)	4–2	(Kazakhstan) Astana	0–1	4–1 (a.e.t.)
Connah's Quay Nomads (Wales)	2–3	(Kosovo) Ballkani	0–0	2–3
Zira (Azerbaijan)	6–0	(Georgia (country)) Torpedo Kutaisi	3–0	3–0
Differdange 03 (Luxembourg)	1–3	(Finland) Ilves	0–0	1–3
Dinamo Minsk (Belarus)	1–1 (6–5 p)	(North Macedonia) Sileks	0–1	1–0 (a.e.t.)
Liepāja (Latvia)	3–1 (Note: Order of legs reversed after original draw.)	(Montenegro) Dečić	1–0	2–1
Elbasani (Albania)	1–1 (4–5 p)	(Belarus) BATE Borisov	1–1	0–0 (a.e.t.)
Glentoran (Northern Ireland)	1–4	(Latvia) RFS	1–2	0–2
Atlètic Club d'Escaldes (Andorra)	4–2	(Montenegro) Mornar	2–1	2–1
Mondorf-les-Bains (Luxembourg)	2–3	(Georgia (country)) Dinamo Tbilisi	1–2	1–1 (a.e.t.)
Petrovac (Montenegro)	2–5	(Lithuania) Žalgiris	1–3	1–2
Caernarfon Town (Wales)	0–10	(Estonia) FCI Levadia	0–5	0–5
Marsaxlokk (Malta)	0–4	(Armenia) Pyunik	0–3	0–1
Hegelmann (Lithuania)	1–4	(Estonia) Paide Linnameeskond	1–1	0–3
Alashkert (Armenia)	3–3 (6–5 p)	(Kazakhstan) Yelimay	1–1	2–2 (a.e.t.)
Stjarnan (Iceland)	5–3	(Faroe Islands) Víkingur	3–1	2–2
Dila Gori (Georgia (country))	3–2	(San Marino) Virtus	3–1	0–1
Sarajevo (Bosnia and Herzegovina)	2–3	(Finland) Inter Turku	1–1	1–2
Europa (Gibraltar)	0–6	(North Macedonia) Shkëndija	0–5	0–1
Nõmme Kalju (Estonia)	3–2	(Northern Ireland) Linfield	1–0	2–2
Penybont (Wales)	0–4	(Andorra) FC Santa Coloma	0–1	0–3
NSÍ (Faroe Islands)	3–2	(Malta) Hamrun Spartans	1–1	2–1
UNA Strassen (Luxembourg)	3–0	(San Marino) La Fiorita	1–0	2–0
Vllaznia (Albania)	2–6	(Kosovo) Malisheva	2–1	0–5

=== Matches ===
9 July 2026
19:00

Velež Mostar (Bosnia and Herzegovina)	1–1	(Moldova) Milsami Orhei
Ignatov 90+2'	Report	Odubia 54'

Bilino Polje Stadium, Zenica (Note: Velež Mostar played their home matches at Bilino Polje Stadium in Zenica instead of their own stadium, Stadion Rođeni in Mostar, which did not fulfil UEFA requirements.)
Attendance: 1,294
Referee: Ioannis Christodoulou (Cyprus)
16 July 2026
19:00 (20:00 UTC+3)

Milsami Orhei (Moldova)	0–1	(Bosnia and Herzegovina) Velež Mostar
	Report	Mešić 82'

CSR Orhei, Orhei
Attendance: 2,200
Referee: Duncan Nicolson (Scotland)

Velež Mostar won 2–1 on aggregate.

9 July 2026
19:00 (18:00 UTC+1)

Bohemians (Republic of Ireland)	2–0	(Gibraltar) St Joseph's
James-Taylor 60' (pen.); Parsons 90+1'	Report

Dalymount Park, Dublin
Attendance: 3,683
Referee: Lasse Læbel Graagaard (Denmark)
16 July 2026
18:00

St Joseph's (Gibraltar)	0–0	(Republic of Ireland) Bohemians
	Report

Europa Sports Park, Gibraltar
Attendance: 1,044
Referee: Kristaps Ratnieks (Latvia)

Bohemians won 2–0 on aggregate.

9 July 2026
21:00

Dinamo City (Albania)	0–1	(Kazakhstan) Astana
	Report	Karimov 69'

Elbasan Arena, Elbasan (Note: Dinamo City played their home matches at Elbasan Arena in Elbasan instead of their own stadium, Selman Stërmasi Stadium in Tirana, which did not fulfil UEFA requirements.)
Attendance: 400
Referee: Lukáš Dzivjak (Slovakia)
16 July 2026
17:00 (20:00 UTC+5)

Astana (Kazakhstan)	1–4 (a.e.t.)	(Albania) Dinamo City
Islamkhan 23' (pen.)	Report	Dita 50' (pen.); Berisha 62'; Vila 93'; Koma 120+4'

Astana Arena, Astana
Attendance: 15,270
Referee: Oscar Johnson (Sweden)

Dinamo City won 4–2 on aggregate.

8 July 2026
19:30 (18:30 UTC+1)

Connah's Quay Nomads (Wales)	0–0	(Kosovo) Ballkani
	Report

Llanelian Road, Old Colwyn (Note: Connah's Quay Nomads played their home match at Llanelian Road in Old Colwyn instead of their own stadium, Deeside Stadium in Connah's Quay, which did not meet UEFA requirements.)
Attendance: 965
Referee: Johann Ingi Jonsson (Iceland)
16 July 2026
20:00

Ballkani (Kosovo)	3–2	(Wales) Connah's Quay Nomads
Kuč 20'; Giovanni 49'; Serebe 58'	Report	Woodcock 69' (pen.); Mehasseb 76'

Fadil Vokrri Stadium, Pristina (Note: Ballkani played their home matches at Fadil Vokrri Stadium in Priština instead of their own stadium, Theranda City Stadium in Suhareka, which did not fulfil UEFA requirements.)
Attendance: 957
Referee: Ashot Ghaltakhchyan (Armenia)

Ballkani won 3–2 on aggregate.

8 July 2026
18:00 (20:00 UTC+4)

Zira (Azerbaijan)	3–0	(Georgia (country)) Torpedo Kutaisi
Renato 32', 63' (pen.); Volkovi 47'	Report

Sumgayit City Stadium, Sumgait (Note: Zira played their home matches at Sumgayit City Stadium in Sumgait instead of their own stadium, Zira Olympic Sport Complex Stadium in Zira, which did not fulfil UEFA requirements.)
Attendance: 1,490
Referee: Joni Hyytiä (Finland)
16 July 2026
18:00 (20:00 UTC+4)

Torpedo Kutaisi (Georgia (country))	0–3	(Azerbaijan) Zira
	Report	Aydın 25', 70'; Seydiyev 39'

Ramaz Shengelia Stadium, Kutaisi
Attendance: 3,500
Referee: Mihály Káprály (Hungary)

Zira won 6–0 on aggregate.

8 July 2026
19:30

Differdange 03 (Luxembourg)	0–0	(Finland) Ilves
	Report

Stade Municipal de la Ville de Differdange, Differdange
Attendance: 1,355
Referee: Igor Bosca (Moldova)
16 July 2026
18:00 (19:00 UTC+3)

Ilves (Finland)	3–1	(Luxembourg) Differdange 03
Raap 57'; Kanga 68' (pen.); Riski 75'	Report	Thill 45'

Tammelan Stadion, Tampere
Attendance: 4,009
Referee: Jakob Sundberg (Denmark)

Ilves won 3–1 on aggregate.

9 July 2026
19:00 (20:00 UTC+3)

Dinamo Minsk (Belarus)	0–1	(North Macedonia) Sileks
	Report	Hasukić 42' (pen.)

Stadion Beroe, Stara Zagora, Bulgaria (Note: Due to the country's involvement in the Russian invasion of Ukraine, Belarusian teams were required to play their home matches at neutral venues and behind closed doors until further notice.)
Attendance: 0
Referee: Jóhan Hendrik Ellefsen (Faroe Islands)
16 July 2026
20:00

Sileks (North Macedonia)	0–1 (a.e.t.)	(Belarus) Dinamo Minsk
	Report	Malashevich 16'
Penalties
Velinovski (penalty scored); Bogdanovski (penalty scored); Mishov (penalty scored); Delimeđac (penalty scored); Angjeleski (penalty scored); Timovski (penalty missed)	5–6	(penalty scored) Begunov; (penalty scored) Abdullahi; (penalty scored) Sokolovskiy; (penalty scored) Alykulov; (penalty scored) Lutskovich; (penalty scored) Kalinin

Petar Miloševski Training Centre, Skopje (Note: Sileks played their home match at Petar Miloševski Training Centre in Skopje instead of their own stadium, City Stadium Sileks in Kratovo, which did not meet UEFA requirements.)
Attendance: 1,100
Referee: Marius Hansen Grøtta (Norway)

1–1 on aggregate; Dinamo Minsk won 6–5 on penalties.

9 July 2026
18:00 (19:00 UTC+3)

Liepāja (Latvia)	1–0	(Montenegro) Dečić
Oloko 64'	Report

Daugava Stadium, Liepāja
Attendance: 1,960
Referee: Ben McMaster (Northern Ireland)
15 July 2026
20:30

Dečić (Montenegro)	1–2	(Latvia) Liepāja
Kontić 12'	Report	Leidsman 45+1'; Fellipe 61'

Stadion Tuško Polje, Tuzi
Attendance: 853
Referee: Tural Kurbanov (Azerbaijan)

Liepāja won 3–1 on aggregate.

7 July 2026
20:00

Elbasani (Albania)	1–1	(Belarus) BATE Borisov
Nikaj 45+1'	Report	Rusakov 67'

Elbasan Arena, Elbasan
Attendance: 4,123
Referee: Ion Orlic (Moldova)
16 July 2026
19:00 (21:00 UTC+4)

BATE Borisov (Belarus)	0–0 (a.e.t.)	(Albania) Elbasani
	Report
Penalties
Dubovskiy (penalty scored); Angban (penalty scored); Sakhonchik (penalty missed); Rusakov (penalty scored); Kress (penalty scored); Khramtsevich (penalty scored)	5–4	(penalty scored) Lleshi; (penalty scored) Lulaj; (penalty scored) Boye; (penalty scored) Lila; (penalty missed) Karrica; (penalty missed) Epitaux

Sumgayit City Stadium, Sumgait, Azerbaijan
Attendance: 44
Referee: Daniyar Sakhi (Kazakhstan)

1–1 on aggregate; BATE Borisov won 5–4 on penalties.

9 July 2026
20:30 (19:30 UTC+1)

Glentoran (Northern Ireland)	1–2	(Latvia) RFS
Rossi 38'	Report	Ķigurs 45', 70'

The Oval, Belfast
Attendance: 2,422
Referee: Ross Hardie (Scotland)
16 July 2026
18:30 (19:30 UTC+3)

RFS (Latvia)	2–0	(Northern Ireland) Glentoran
Saidy 5'; Ikaunieks 61'	Report

LNK Sporta Parks, Riga
Attendance: 1,537
Referee: Peiman Simani (Finland)

RFS won 4–1 on aggregate.

9 July 2026
16:00

Atlètic Club d'Escaldes (Andorra)	2–1	(Montenegro) Mornar
Borja Morales 83', 90+3'	Report	Zorić 8'

Estadi Nacional, Andorra la Vella
Attendance: 150
Referee: Bálint Kišš (Slovakia)
16 July 2026
20:45

Mornar (Montenegro)	1–2	(Andorra) Atlètic Club d'Escaldes
Dašić 20'	Report	Valero 90' (pen.), 90+3' (pen.)

Stadion pod Goricom, Podgorica (Note: Mornar played their home match at Stadion pod Goricom in Podgorica instead of their own stadium, Stadion Topolica in Bar, which did not meet UEFA requirements.)
Attendance: 1,140
Referee: Aaron Wyn Jones (Wales)

Atlètic Club d'Escaldes won 4–2 on aggregate.

9 July 2026
19:15

Mondorf-les-Bains (Luxembourg)	1–2	(Georgia (country)) Dinamo Tbilisi
Far 71'	Report	Bah 2'; Vatsadze 19'

Stade Achille Hammerel, Luxembourg City (Note: Mondorf-les-Bains played their home match at Stade Achille Hammerel in Luxembourg instead of their own stadium, Stade John Grün in Mondorf-les-Bains, which did not meet UEFA requirements.)
Attendance: 1,219
Referee: Heini Ziskason Viðoy (Faroe Islands)
16 July 2026
19:00 (21:00 UTC+4)

Dinamo Tbilisi (Georgia (country))	1–1 (a.e.t.)	(Luxembourg) Mondorf-les-Bains
Ninua 111' (pen.)	Report	Couturier 87'

Mikheil Meskhi Stadium, Tbilisi (Note: Dinamo Tbilisi played their home matches at Mikheil Meskhi Stadium instead of their own stadium, Boris Paichadze Dinamo Arena.)
Attendance: 3,900
Referee: Gal Levi (Israel)

Dinamo Tbilisi won 3–2 on aggregate.

9 July 2026
20:45

Petrovac (Montenegro)	1–3	(Lithuania) Žalgiris
Carević 27'	Report	Petković 18', 58'; Bilenkyi 87'

Stadion pod Goricom, Podgorica (Note: Petrovac played their home match at Stadion pod Goricom in Podgorica instead of their own stadium, Stadion Mitar Mićo Goliš in Petrovac, which did not meet UEFA requirements.)
Attendance: 1,650
Referee: Dmytro Kubriak (Ukraine)
16 July 2026
19:00 (20:00 UTC+3)

Žalgiris (Lithuania)	2–1	(Montenegro) Petrovac
Petković 60' (pen.); Mihajlović 75'	Report	Selimi 87'

LFF Stadium, Vilnius
Attendance: 5,067
Referee: Ian McNabb (Northern Ireland)

Žalgiris won 5–2 on aggregate.

9 July 2026
19:30 (18:30 UTC+1)

Caernarfon Town (Wales)	0–5	(Estonia) FCI Levadia
	Report	Peetson 15'; João Pedro 41'; Roosnupp 45+1'; Ainsalu 47'; Otoo 79'

The Oval, Caernarfon
Attendance: 1,274
Referee: Dovydas Švėgžda (Lithuania)
16 July 2026
18:30 (19:30 UTC+3)

FCI Levadia (Estonia)	5–0	(Wales) Caernarfon Town
Otoo 4'; Wendell 21'; João Pedro 33' (pen.); Tambedou 70'; Ainsalu 89'	Report

Lilleküla Stadium, Tallinn
Attendance: 1,082
Referee: Ryan Lee (Scotland)

FCI Levadia won 10–0 on aggregate.

9 July 2026
19:00

Marsaxlokk (Malta)	0–3	(Armenia) Pyunik
	Report	Yansané 41' (pen.); Dashyan 51'; Kovalenko 87'

Centenary Stadium, Ta' Qali
Attendance: 396
Referee: Miloš Gigović (Bosnia and Herzegovina)
16 July 2026
18:00 (20:00 UTC+4)

Pyunik (Armenia)	1–0	(Malta) Marsaxlokk
Kulikov 80' (pen.)	Report

Vazgen Sargsyan Republican Stadium, Yerevan
Attendance: 2,350
Referee: Aaron O'Dowd (Republic of Ireland)

Pyunik won 4–0 on aggregate.

9 July 2026
18:00 (19:00 UTC+3)

Hegelmann (Lithuania)	1–1	(Estonia) Paide Linnameeskond
Armanavičius 45+1'	Report	Badamosi 37'

Raudondvaris Stadium, Raudondvaris
Attendance: 510
Referee: Cihan Aydın (Turkey)
16 July 2026
18:00 (19:00 UTC+3)

Paide Linnameeskond (Estonia)	3–0	(Lithuania) Hegelmann
Sohna 17'; Badamosi 42'; Piht 69'	Report

Pärnu Rannastaadion, Pärnu (Note: Paide played their home matches in the first and second qualifying rounds at Pärnu Rannastaadion in Pärnu, rather than at their regular home ground, the Paide kunstmuruväljak in Paide, which did not fulfil UEFA requirements.)
Attendance: 1,140
Referee: Stojancho Trpchevski (North Macedonia)

Paide Linnameeskond won 4–1 on aggregate.

9 July 2026
18:00 (20:00 UTC+4)

Alashkert (Armenia)	1–1	(Kazakhstan) Yelimay
Terteryan 86'	Report	Ashirbek 60'

Yerevan Football Academy Stadium, Yerevan (Note: Alashkert played their home matches at Yerevan Football Academy Stadium instead of their own stadium, Alashkert Stadium, which did not fulfil UEFA requirements.)
Attendance: 1,264
Referee: Vlatko Ilioski (North Macedonia)
16 July 2026
17:00 (20:00 UTC+5)

Yelimay (Kazakhstan)	2–2 (a.e.t.)	(Armenia) Alashkert
Bakhtiyarov 11'; Ilić 96' (pen.)	Report	Touré 4'; Gabriel 120+1' (o.g.)
Penalties
Payruz (penalty scored); Ilić (penalty scored); Belančić (penalty scored); Sviridov (penalty missed); Ashirbek (penalty scored); Murillo (penalty scored); Palacio (penalty missed)	5–6	(penalty scored) Piloyan; (penalty scored) Massoumou; (penalty scored) Cézar; (penalty missed) Beglaryan; (penalty scored) Granado; (penalty scored) Togola; (penalty scored) Sadoyan

Spartak Stadium, Semey
Attendance: 7,900
Referee: Aleko Aptsiauri (Georgia)

3–3 on aggregate; Alashkert won 6–5 on penalties.

9 July 2026
21:00 (19:00 UTC)

Stjarnan (Iceland)	3–1	(Faroe Islands) Víkingur
Atlason 42' (pen.), 66', 78' (pen.)	Report	Benjaminsen 12'

Stjörnuvöllur, Garðabær
Attendance: 710
Referee: Mohammad Usman Aslam (Norway)
16 July 2026
19:00 (18:00 UTC+1)

Víkingur (Faroe Islands)	2–2	(Iceland) Stjarnan
Benjaminsen 59'; Vatnhamar 61'	Report	Ingason 68'; Nökkvason 81'

Við Djúpumýrar, Klaksvík (Note: Víkingur played their home match at Við Djúpumýrar in Klaksvík instead of their own stadium, Sarpugerði in Norðragøta, which did not meet UEFA requirements.)
Attendance: 527
Referee: Karl Koppel (Estonia)

Stjarnan won 5–3 on aggregate.

9 July 2026
18:00 (20:00 UTC+4)

Dila Gori (Georgia (country))	3–1	(San Marino) Virtus
Shekiladze 8'; Anoff 14'; Kante 64'	Report	Benincasa 3'

Tengiz Burjanadze Stadium, Gori
Attendance: 1,635
Referee: Miloš Bošković (Montenegro)
16 July 2026
21:00

Virtus (San Marino)	1–0	(Georgia (country)) Dila Gori
Ciacci 90+3'	Report

San Marino Stadium, Serravalle
Attendance: 288
Referee: Mervan Bejtullahu (Kosovo)

Dila Gori won 3–2 on aggregate.

9 July 2026
21:00

Sarajevo (Bosnia and Herzegovina)	1–1	(Finland) Inter Turku
Barišić 90+4'	Report	Conteh 7'

Asim Ferhatović Hase Stadium, Sarajevo
Attendance: 10,107
Referee: Fotios Polychronis (Greece)
16 July 2026
17:00 (18:00 UTC+3)

Inter Turku (Finland)	2–1	(Bosnia and Herzegovina) Sarajevo
Conteh 58'; Jephta 87'	Report	Kyeremeh 22'

Veritas Stadion, Turku
Attendance: 2,516
Referee: Karel Rouček (Czech Republic)

Inter Turku won 3–2 on aggregate.

9 July 2026
19:30

Europa (Gibraltar)	0–5	(North Macedonia) Shkëndija
	Report	Ndzengue 28'; Tamba 52', 75'; Kryeziu 83'; Ibraimi 88'

Europa Sports Park, Gibraltar
Attendance: 582
Referee: Konstantinos Fellas (Cyprus)
16 July 2026
20:00

Shkëndija (North Macedonia)	1–0	(Gibraltar) Europa
Krstevski 86'	Report

Toše Proeski Arena, Skopje (Note: Shkëndija played their home matches at Toše Proeski Arena in Skopje instead of their own stadium, Ecolog Arena in Tetovo, which did not fulfil UEFA requirements.)
Attendance: 1,145
Referee: Anton Lashuk (Belarus)

Shkëndija won 6–0 on aggregate.

9 July 2026
18:00 (19:00 UTC+3)

Nõmme Kalju (Estonia)	1–0	(Northern Ireland) Linfield
Baptista 47'	Report

Pärnu Rannastaadion, Pärnu (Note: Nõmme Kalju played their home matches at Pärnu Rannastaadion in Pärnu instead of their own stadium, Hiiu Stadium in Tallinn, which did not fulfil UEFA requirements.)
Attendance: 712
Referee: Andreu Simarro (Andorra)
16 July 2026
20:45 (19:45 UTC+1)

Linfield (Northern Ireland)	2–2	(Estonia) Nõmme Kalju
McGee 11'; Offord 49'	Report	Musolitin 27'; Orlov 90+2'

Windsor Park, Belfast
Attendance: 2,603
Referee: Jacob Karlsen (Denmark)

Nõmme Kalju won 3–2 on aggregate.

9 July 2026
20:45 (19:45 UTC+1)

Penybont (Wales)	0–1	(Andorra) FC Santa Coloma
	Report	G. López 16'

Cardiff City Stadium, Cardiff (Note: Penybont played their home match at Cardiff City Stadium in Cardiff, rather than at their regular home ground, the Dragonbet Stadium in Bridgend, because the latter did not meet UEFA specifications for European football.)
Attendance: 1,986
Referee: Michele Beltrano (San Marino)
16 July 2026
19:00

FC Santa Coloma (Andorra)	3–0	(Wales) Penybont
Muñoz 20'; Gómez 59'; Temenuzhkov 82'	Report

Estadi Nacional, Andorra la Vella
Attendance: 372
Referee: Mathias Støfringshaug (Norway)

FC Santa Coloma won 4–0 on aggregate.

9 July 2026
20:45 (19:45 UTC+1)

NSÍ (Faroe Islands)	1–1	(Malta) Hamrun Spartans
P. Knudsen 26'	Report	Bjørnstad 56'

Við Djúpumýrar, Klaksvík (Note: NSÍ played their home matches at Við Djúpumýrar in Klaksvík instead of their own stadium, Við Løkin in Runavík, which did not fulfil UEFA requirements.)
Attendance: 697
Referee: Kevin O'Sullivan (Republic of Ireland)
16 July 2026
19:30

Hamrun Spartans (Malta)	1–2	(Faroe Islands) NSÍ
Ćorić 53'	Report	Przybylski 43'; P. Knudsen 90+4' (pen.)

Centenary Stadium, Ta' Qali (Note: Hamrun Spartans played their home match at Centenary Stadium in Ta' Qali instead of their own stadium, Victor Tedesco Stadium in Hamrun, which did not meet UEFA requirements.)
Attendance: 1,490
Referee: Jérémy Muller (Luxembourg)

NSÍ won 3–2 on aggregate.

7 July 2026
19:15

UNA Strassen (Luxembourg)	1–0	(San Marino) La Fiorita
Cicarelli 85' (o.g.)	Report

Stade Achille Hammerel, Luxembourg City (Note: UNA Strassen played their home matches at Stade Achille Hammerel in Luxembourg City instead of their own stadium, Stade An de Millewisen in Strassen, which did not fulfil UEFA requirements.)
Attendance: 807
Referee: Ihar Shumilau (Belarus)
14 July 2026
21:00

La Fiorita (San Marino)	0–2	(Luxembourg) UNA Strassen
	Report	Perez 8'; Steinmetz 38'

San Marino Stadium, Serravalle
Attendance: 298
Referee: Seth Galia (Gibraltar)

UNA Strassen won 3–0 on aggregate.

9 July 2026
20:00

Vllaznia (Albania)	2–1	(Kosovo) Malisheva
Qato 37'; Musta 56'	Report	Xhylani 4'

Loro Boriçi Stadium, Shkodër
Attendance: 2,500
Referee: Giorgi Avazashvili (Georgia)
15 July 2026
16:30

Malisheva (Kosovo)	5–0	(Albania) Vllaznia
Uka 34', 52'; Ibishi 45+2'; Veliu 57'; Dulaj 89'	Report

Kampi Nacional Hajvalia, Hajvalia (Note: Malisheva played their first qualifying round home match at Kampi Nacional Hajvalia in Hajvalia, rather than at their regular home ground, the Liman Gegaj Stadium in Malisheva.)
Attendance: 837
Referee: Tom Owen (Wales)

Malisheva won 6–2 on aggregate.

== Second qualifying round ==
=== Summary ===
The first legs were played on 21, 22 and 23 July, and the second legs were played on 28, 29 and 30 July 2026.

The winners of the ties advanced to the third qualifying round.

Second qualifying round
Team 1	Agg.	Team 2	1st leg	2nd leg
Champions Path
Tre Fiori (San Marino)	Bye	N/A	—	—
Inter Club d'Escaldes (Andorra)	Bye	N/A	—	—
Borac Banja Luka (Bosnia and Herzegovina)	6–3	(Moldova) Petrocub Hîncești	3–0	3–3
Atert Bissen (Luxembourg)	3–7	(Hungary) ETO Győr	2–6	1–1
ML Vitebsk (Belarus)	5–1	(Montenegro) Sutjeska	3–0	2–1
Flora (Estonia)	1–1 (4–2 p)	(Wales) The New Saints	1–0	0–1 (a.e.t.)
Floriana (Malta)	2–3	(Kosovo) Drita	1–1	1–2 (a.e.t.)
Vardar (North Macedonia)	4–8	(Latvia) Riga	2–3	2–5 (a.e.t.)
Main Path
Rijeka (Croatia)	2–0	(Republic of Ireland) Derry City	1–0	1–0
İstanbul Başakşehir (Turkey)	1–3	(Finland) Inter Turku	1–1	0–2
Lugano (Switzerland)	6–1	(Kosovo) Dukagjini	1–0	5–1
HJK (Finland)	8–0	(Northern Ireland) Coleraine	5–0	3–0
FCSB (Romania)	3–7	(Latvia) Auda	2–3	1–4
RFS (Latvia)	5–2	(Iceland) Vestri	4–1	1–1
Raków Częstochowa (Poland)	7–1	(Malta) Valletta	3–1	4–0
Liepāja (Latvia)	1–5	Austria Wien	0–2	1–3
Debrecen (Hungary)	1–0	(Armenia) Pyunik	1–0	0–0
GAIS (Sweden)	1–6	(Denmark) Nordsjælland	1–0	0–6
IFK Göteborg (Sweden)	4–3	(Estonia) FCI Levadia	1–2	3–1 (a.e.t.)
Žilina (Slovakia)	3–4	(Poland) GKS Katowice	2–1	1–3
Varaždin (Croatia)	3–4	(Czech Republic) Jablonec	3–2	0–2
Dila Gori (Georgia (country))	0–7	(Cyprus) Apollon Limassol	0–4	0–3
Bravo (Slovenia)	3–4	(North Macedonia) Shkëndija	2–1	1–3
Universitatea Cluj (Romania)	3–5	(Norway) Brann	2–2	1–3
Shelbourne (Republic of Ireland)	6–4	(Estonia) Nõmme Kalju	5–2	1–2
Valur (Iceland)	3–2	(Bosnia and Herzegovina) Zrinjski Mostar	1–0	2–2
Zimbru Chișinău (Moldova)	2–3	(Armenia) Noah	1–1	1–2
Dinamo Tbilisi (Georgia (country))	5–7	(Lithuania) Žalgiris	3–0	2–7
Aluminij (Slovenia)	1–4	(Albania) Dinamo City	1–1	0–3
DAC Dunajská Streda (Slovakia)	4–0	(Bosnia and Herzegovina) Velež Mostar	1–0	3–0
BATE Borisov (Belarus)	1–5	(Switzerland) Sion	1–1	0–4
Stjarnan (Iceland)	2–2 (4–5 p)	(Finland) Ilves	1–0	1–2 (a.e.t.)
Motherwell (Scotland)	5–0	(Faroe Islands) HB	2–0	3–0
Panevėžys (Lithuania)	2–2 (2–3 p)	(Kazakhstan) Tobol	1–1	1–1 (a.e.t.)
Malisheva (Kosovo)	3–4	(Scotland) Hibernian	2–0	1–4
Neftçi (Azerbaijan)	3–4	(Belarus) Dinamo Minsk	2–4	1–0
Paks (Hungary)	3–4	(Greece) Panathinaikos	1–2	2–2
Železničar Pančevo (Serbia)	0–5	(Portugal) Braga	0–1	0–4
Vojvodina (Serbia)	2–8	(Netherlands) Ajax	1–4	1–4
Polissya Zhytomyr (Ukraine)	4–5	(Denmark) Copenhagen	3–3	1–2
LNZ Cherkasy (Ukraine)	0–0 (2–4 p)	(Belgium) Gent	0–0	0–0 (a.e.t.)
FC Santa Coloma (Andorra)	3–9	(Austria) Rapid Wien	1–3	2–6
Hapoel Tel Aviv (Israel)	4–2	(Bulgaria) Ludogorets Razgrad	2–0	2–2
Alashkert (Armenia)	1–4	(Romania) CFR Cluj	1–1	0–3
Bohemians (Republic of Ireland)	4–4 (5–4 p)	(Kosovo) Ballkani	2–1	2–3 (a.e.t.)
Paide Linnameeskond (Estonia)	2–1	(Azerbaijan) Zira	1–0	1–1
Vaduz (Liechtenstein)	6–0	(Andorra) Atlètic Club d'Escaldes	4–0	2–0
Spartak Trnava (Slovakia)	0–0 (3–5 p)	(Bulgaria) CSKA 1948	0–0	0–0 (a.e.t.)
NSÍ (Faroe Islands)	3–3 (4–3 p)	(Slovenia) Koper	0–2	3–1 (a.e.t.)
AEK Larnaca (Cyprus)	3–3 (3–4 p)	(Israel) Beitar Jerusalem	0–1	3–2 (a.e.t.)
Partizan (Serbia)	5–0	(Luxembourg) UNA Strassen	4–0	1–0

=== Champions Path matches ===
23 July 2026
20:30

Borac Banja Luka (Bosnia and Herzegovina)	3–0	(Moldova) Petrocub Hîncești
Hrelja 20'; Juričić 64'; Roguljić 87'	Report

Banja Luka City Stadium, Banja Luka
Attendance: 7,352
Referee: Jakob Sundberg (Denmark)
30 July 2026
19:00 (20:00 UTC+3)

Petrocub Hîncești (Moldova)	3–3	(Bosnia and Herzegovina) Borac Banja Luka
Rotaru 13', 52'; Popescu 19'	Report	Savić 50'; Hiros 56'; Roguljić 78'

Zimbru Stadium, Chișinău (Note: Petrocub Hîncești played their home match at Zimbru Stadium instead of their regular stadium, Hîncești Municipal Stadium, which did not meet UEFA requirements.)
Attendance: 4,153
Referee: Duje Strukan (Croatia)

Borac Banja Luka won 6–3 on aggregate.

21 July 2026
20:15

Atert Bissen (Luxembourg)	2–6	(Hungary) ETO Győr
Ferber 20'; Abi 75'	Report	Bumba 12'; Vitális 24'; Njie 44', 47'; Đukanović 83'; Bánáti 90+1'

Stade de Luxembourg, Luxembourg City (Note: Atert Bissen played their home match at Stade de Luxembourg instead of their regular stadium, Terrain ZAC Klengbousbierg, which did not meet UEFA requirements.)
Attendance: 1,021
Referee: Iwan Arwel Griffith (Wales)
30 July 2026
19:00

ETO Győr (Hungary)	1–1	(Luxembourg) Atert Bissen
Krpić 76' (pen.)	Report	Ferber 28'

ETO Park, Győr
Attendance: 4,235
Referee: Dmytro Kubriak (Ukraine)

ETO Győr won 7–3 on aggregate.

23 July 2026
19:00

ML Vitebsk (Belarus)	3–0	(Montenegro) Sutjeska
Gromyko 31'; Gomanov 37'; Diabaté 65'	Report

Mezőkövesdi Városi Stadion, Mezőkövesd, Hungary
Attendance: 0
Referee: Jérémy Muller (Luxembourg)
30 July 2026
21:00

Sutjeska (Montenegro)	1–2	(Belarus) ML Vitebsk
Tošković 84'	Report	Kontsevoy 16'; Diabaté 90'

Gradski stadion, Nikšić
Attendance: 1,110
Referee: Oguzhan Çakir (Turkey)

ML Vitebsk won 5–1 on aggregate.

23 July 2026
18:00 (19:00 UTC+3)

Flora (Estonia)	1–0	(Wales) The New Saints
Valdmets 31'	Report

Lilleküla Stadium, Tallinn
Attendance: 1,257
Referee: Kristoffer Karlsson (Sweden)
30 July 2026
19:30 (18:30 UTC+1)

The New Saints (Wales)	1–0 (a.e.t.)	(Estonia) Flora
B. Wilson 90+1'	Report
Penalties
B. Wilson (penalty missed); Brobbel (penalty scored); Lock (penalty missed); D. Williams (penalty scored)	2–4	(penalty scored) Teeväli; (penalty scored) Alliku; (penalty missed) Varjund; (penalty scored) Kalimullin; (penalty scored) Usta

Park Hall, Oswestry
Attendance: 958
Referee: Vitālijs Spasjoņņikovs (Latvia)

1–1 on aggregate; Flora won 4–2 on penalties.

21 July 2026
19:30

Floriana (Malta)	1–1	(Kosovo) Drita
Drina 90+9'	Report	Balaj 90+4'

Centenary Stadium, Ta' Qali
Attendance: 770
Referee: Marius Hansen Grøtta (Norway)
28 July 2026
20:00

Drita (Kosovo)	2–1 (a.e.t.)	(Malta) Floriana
Pëllumbi 88'; Kauan 91' (o.g.)	Report	Mbong 40'

Fadil Vokrri Stadium, Pristina (Note: Drita played their home match at Fadil Vokrri Stadium instead of their regular stadium, Gjilan City Stadium, which did not meet UEFA requirements.)
Attendance: 2,370
Referee: Horațiu Feșnic (Romania)

Drita won 3–2 on aggregate.

22 July 2026
20:00

Vardar (North Macedonia)	2–3	(Latvia) Riga
Castañeda 28'; Rodrigues 66'	Report	Galo 35'; Iago 39', 81'

Toše Proeski Arena, Skopje
Attendance: 2,708
Referee: Philip Farrugia (Malta)
28 July 2026
19:00 (20:00 UTC+3)

Riga (Latvia)	5–2 (a.e.t.)	(North Macedonia) Vardar
Taiwo 87'; Aouani 92'; Iago 105'; Ramires 109'; Caio 117'	Report	Babunski 17'; Omeragić 66'

Skonto Stadium, Riga
Attendance: 3,852
Referee: Wojciech Myć (Poland)

Riga won 8–4 on aggregate.

=== Main Path matches ===
23 July 2026
20:45

Rijeka (Croatia)	1–0	(Republic of Ireland) Derry City
Fruk 52'	Report

Stadion Rujevica, Rijeka
Attendance: 5,844
Referee: José Luis Munuera Montero (Spain)
30 July 2026
19:30 (18:30 UTC+1)

Derry City (Republic of Ireland)	0–1	(Croatia) Rijeka
	Report	Adu-Adjei 14'

Ryan McBride Brandywell Stadium, Derry
Attendance: 3,645
Referee: João Gonçalves (Portugal)

Rijeka won 2–0 on aggregate.

22 July 2026
19:45 (20:45 UTC+3)

İstanbul Başakşehir (Turkey)	1–1	(Finland) Inter Turku
Bayram 54'	Report	Jephta 16'

Başakşehir Fatih Terim Stadium, Istanbul
Attendance: 7,164
Referee: Juan Martínez Munuera (Spain)
30 July 2026
18:00 (19:00 UTC+3)

Inter Turku (Finland)	2–0	(Turkey) İstanbul Başakşehir
Tuominen 18'; Jephta 47'	Report

Kupittaa Football Stadium, Turku
Attendance: 4,188
Referee: Nathan Verboomen (Belgium)

Inter Turku won 3–1 on aggregate.

23 July 2026
20:30

Lugano (Switzerland)	1–0	(Kosovo) Dukagjini
Steffen 31'	Report

Lugano Arena, Lugano
Attendance: 5,917
Referee: Viktar Shymusik (Belarus)
29 July 2026
16:30

Dukagjini (Kosovo)	1–5	(Switzerland) Lugano
Maliqi 10'	Report	Behrens 6', 36', 58'; Dos Santos 9'; Sinani 51' (o.g.)

Kampi Nacional Hajvalia, Hajvalia (Note: Dukagjini played their home match at Kampi Nacional Hajvalia in Hajvalia, rather than at their regular home ground, the 18 June Stadium in Klina, which did not fulfil UEFA requirements.)
Attendance: 973
Referee: Karel Rouček (Czech Republic)

Lugano won 6–1 on aggregate.

23 July 2026
18:00 (19:00 UTC+3)

HJK (Finland)	5–0	(Northern Ireland) Coleraine
Möller 12'; Mentu 32'; Mero 47'; Pukki 80', 82'	Report

Töölö Football Stadium, Helsinki
Attendance: 4,287
Referee: Novak Simović (Serbia)
30 July 2026
20:45 (19:45 UTC+1)

Coleraine (Northern Ireland)	0–3	(Finland) HJK
	Report	Mero 12'; Cicale 34'; Guèye 53'

Inver Park, Larne (Note: Coleraine played their home match at Inver Park in Larne, rather than at their regular home ground, the The Showgrounds in Coleraine, which did not fulfil UEFA requirements.)
Attendance: 1,028
Referee: Seth Galia (Gibraltar)

HJK won 8–0 on aggregate.

23 July 2026
19:45 (20:45 UTC+3)

FCSB (Romania)	2–3	(Latvia) Auda
O. Popescu 23'; Boutoutaou 71'	Report	Dašķevičs 5'; Diedhiou 32'; K. Kone 90+4'

Steaua Stadium, Bucharest (Note: FCSB played their home match at Steaua Stadium, rather than at their regular home ground, the Arena Națională in Bucharest.)
Attendance: 13,319
Referee: David Fuxman (Israel)
30 July 2026
18:00 (19:00 UTC+3)

Auda (Latvia)	4–1	(Romania) FCSB
Diedhiou 45+2', 67'; K. Kone 84'; Hrvoj 90+3'	Report	João Paulo 58'

Skonto Stadium, Riga (Note: Auda played their second qualifying round home match at Skonto Stadium in Riga, rather than at their regular home ground, the Ķekava Stadium in Ķekava, which did not fulfil UEFA requirements.)
Attendance: 3,618
Referee: Tom Owen (Wales)

Auda won 7–3 on aggregate.

23 July 2026
18:30 (19:30 UTC+3)

RFS (Latvia)	4–1	(Iceland) Vestri
Panić 18'; Ikaunieks 23'; Ndjiki 43'; Lemajić 66'	Report	Mörfelt 63'

LNK Sporta Parks, Riga
Attendance: 1,436
Referee: Aaron Wyn Jones (Wales)
30 July 2026
20:00 (18:00 UTC)

Vestri (Iceland)	1–1	(Latvia) RFS
Hafþórsson 12'	Report	Sylla 16'

Valbjarnarvöllur, Reykjavík (Note: Vestri played their home match at Valbjarnarvöllur in Reykjavík instead of their regular stadium, Torfnesvöllur in Ísafjörður, which did not fulfil UEFA requirements.)
Attendance: 423
Referee: Menelaos Antoniou (Cyprus)

RFS won 5–2 on aggregate.

23 July 2026
18:30

Raków Częstochowa (Poland)	3–1	(Malta) Valletta
Emreli 53'; Makuch 78'; Svarnas 90'	Report	Morello 23'

Miejski Stadion Piłkarski Raków, Częstochowa
Attendance: 5,302
Referee: Kadir Sağlam (Turkey)
30 July 2026
19:30

Valletta (Malta)	0–4	(Poland) Raków Częstochowa
	Report	Ameyaw 22'; Pieńko 31'; Molnár 54'; Makuch 78'

Centenary Stadium, Ta' Qali
Attendance: 1,398
Referee: Pavle Ilić (Serbia)

Raków Częstochowa won 7–1 on aggregate.

23 July 2026
17:00 (18:00 UTC+3)

Liepāja (Latvia)	0–2	Austria Wien
	Report	Wustinger 31'; Wels 55'

Sloka Stadium, Jurmala (Note: Liepāja played their second round home match at Sloka Stadium in Jurmala, rather than at their regular home ground, the Daugava Stadium in Liepāja.)
Attendance: 1,368
Referee: Helgi Mikael Jónasson (Iceland)
30 July 2026
20:30

Austria Wien	3–1	(Latvia) Liepāja
Feddersen 19'; Boateng 29'; Ranflt 66'	Report	Haïdara 4'

Generali Arena, Vienna
Attendance: 8,300
Referee: Luca Zufferli (Italy)

Austria Wien won 5–1 on aggregate.

23 July 2026
18:00

Debrecen (Hungary)	1–0	(Armenia) Pyunik
Cibla 55'	Report

Nagyerdei Stadion, Debrecen
Attendance: 8,523
Referee: Jacob Karlsen (Denmark)
30 July 2026
18:00 (20:00 UTC+4)

Pyunik (Armenia)	0–0	(Hungary) Debrecen
	Report

Vazgen Sargsyan Republican Stadium, Yerevan
Attendance: 3,895
Referee: Igor Stojchevski (North Macedonia)

Debrecen won 1–0 on aggregate.

23 July 2026
19:00

GAIS (Sweden)	1–0	(Denmark) Nordsjælland
De Brienne 42'	Report

Gamla Ullevi, Gothenburg
Attendance: 11,714
Referee: Peiman Simani (Finland)
30 July 2026
19:00

Nordsjælland (Denmark)	6–0	(Sweden) GAIS
Norheim 11', 59'; Berthelsen 14'; Boe 37'; Amoako 63'; Røjkjær 81'	Report

Right to Dream Park, Farum
Attendance: 5,477
Referee: Giorgi Avazashvili (Georgia)

Nordsjælland won 6–1 on aggregate.

21 July 2026
19:00

IFK Göteborg (Sweden)	1–2	(Estonia) FCI Levadia
Nwankwo 90+2' (o.g.)	Report	Wendell 33', 45+1'

Gamla Ullevi, Gothenburg
Attendance: 15,749
Referee: Dmytro Panchyshyn (Ukraine)
30 July 2026
18:30 (19:30 UTC+3)

FCI Levadia (Estonia)	1–3 (a.e.t.)	(Sweden) IFK Göteborg
Skvortsov 120+1'	Report	Bergmark Wiberg 57', 93'; Alioum 103'

Lilleküla Stadium, Tallinn
Attendance: 7,725
Referee: Sigurd Kringstad (Norway)

IFK Göteborg won 4–3 on aggregate.

23 July 2026
20:30

Žilina (Slovakia)	2–1	(Poland) GKS Katowice
Káčer 29' (pen.); Hranica 48'	Report	Klemenz 6'

Štadión pod Dubňom, Žilina
Attendance: 7,067
Referee: Sven Wolfensberger (Switzerland)
30 July 2026
20:30

GKS Katowice (Poland)	3–1	(Slovakia) Žilina
Zreľák 48'; Wdowiak 79'; Shkurin 82'	Report	Kóša 57'

Arena Katowice, Katowice
Attendance: 12,012
Referee: Bence Csonka (Hungary)

GKS Katowice won 4–3 on aggregate.

23 July 2026
20:00

Varaždin (Croatia)	3–2	(Czech Republic) Jablonec
Tavares 24'; Mamut 68'; Mamić 82'	Report	Cedidla 27'; Tekijaški 56'

Stadion Varteks, Varaždin
Attendance: 3,508
Referee: Matteo Marchetti (Italy)
30 July 2026
18:00

Jablonec (Czech Republic)	2–0	(Croatia) Varaždin
Punčec 29' (o.g.); Pavlović 54'	Report

Stadion Střelnice, Jablonec nad Nisou
Attendance: 4,423
Referee: Florian Lata (Albania)

Jablonec won 4–3 on aggregate.

23 July 2026
18:00

Dila Gori (Georgia (country))	0–4	(Cyprus) Apollon Limassol
	Report	Brandon 14'; Weissbeck 28'; Kikabidze 51' (o.g.); Ožbolt 88'

Tengiz Burjanadze Stadium, Gori
Attendance: 2,599
Referee: Daniel Higraff (Norway)
28 July 2026
19:00 (20:00 UTC+3)

Apollon Limassol (Cyprus)	3–0	(Georgia (country)) Dila Gori
Brandon 22'; Rodrigues 62'; Escriche 90+2'	Report

Alphamega Stadium, Limassol
Attendance: 5,332
Referee: Klym Zabroda (Ukraine)

Apollon Limassol won 7–0 on aggregate.

23 July 2026
20:45

Bravo (Slovenia)	2–1	(North Macedonia) Shkëndija
Kopatin 19'; Stanković 56'	Report	Krasniqi 11' (pen.)

Stožice Stadium, Ljubljana
Attendance: 800
Referee: Joni Hyytiä (Finland)
30 July 2026
20:00

Shkëndija (North Macedonia)	3–1	(Slovenia) Bravo
Jovan 36' (o.g.); Kryeziu 50'; Gjorgjievski 88'	Report	Stanković 17'

Toše Proeski Arena, Skopje
Attendance: 5,200
Referee: Márton Rúsz (Hungary)

Shkëndija won 4–3 on aggregate.

23 July 2026
19:00 (20:00 UTC+3)

Universitatea Cluj (Romania)	2–2	(Norway) Brann
Lukić 85'; Pedro Pinho 87'	Report	Castro 40'; Myhre 53'

Sepsi Arena, Sfântu Gheorghe (Note: Universitatea Cluj played their second qualifying round home match at Sepsi Arena in Sfântu Gheorghe instead of their regular stadium, Cluj Arena in Cluj-Napoca.)
Attendance: 2,821
Referee: Henrik Nalbandyan (Armenia)
30 July 2026
19:00

Brann (Norway)	3–1	(Romania) Universitatea Cluj
Castro 8', 75'; Mathisen 45'	Report	Lukić 26'

Brann Stadion, Bergen
Attendance: 12,308
Referee: Mateo Erceg (Croatia)

Brann won 5–3 on aggregate.

23 July 2026
20:45 (19:45 UTC+1)

Shelbourne (Republic of Ireland)	5–2	(Estonia) Nõmme Kalju
Freitas 3'; Moore 21', 47'; Coote 25'; Ring 89'	Report	Esono 40', 90+1'

Tolka Park, Dublin
Attendance: 3,357
Referee: Szabolcs Kovacs (Romania)
30 July 2026
18:00 (19:00 UTC+3)

Nõmme Kalju (Estonia)	2–1	(Republic of Ireland) Shelbourne
Esono 49'; Jabir 75'	Report	Kelly 14'

Pärnu Rannastaadion, Pärnu
Attendance: 452
Referee: Jóhan Hendrik Ellefsen (Faroe Islands)

Shelbourne won 6–4 on aggregate.

23 July 2026
21:15 (19:15 UTC)

Valur (Iceland)	1–0	(Bosnia and Herzegovina) Zrinjski Mostar
Haraldsson 64'	Report

Hlíðarendi, Reykjavík
Attendance: 310
Referee: Amine Kourgheli (Belarus)
30 July 2026
20:30

Zrinjski Mostar (Bosnia and Herzegovina)	2–2	(Iceland) Valur
Bilbija 11' (pen.); Sakota 75'	Report	Haraldsson 44', 45+2'

Stadion pod Bijelim Brijegom, Mostar
Attendance: 5,107
Referee: Aleko Aptsiauri (Georgia)

Valur won 3–2 on aggregate.

23 July 2026
19:00 (20:00 UTC+3)

Zimbru Chișinău (Moldova)	1–1	(Armenia) Noah
Bîtca 43'	Report	Costache 88'

Zimbru Stadium, Chișinău
Attendance: 5,143
Referee: Karl Koppel (Estonia)
30 July 2026
18:00 (20:00 UTC+4)

Noah (Armenia)	2–1	(Moldova) Zimbru Chișinău
Manvelyan 31'; Sangaré 47'	Report	Jonathas 76'

Vahagn Tumasyan Stadium, Abovyan
Attendance: 3,100
Referee: Mateo Tozan (Slovenia)

Noah won 3–2 on aggregate.

23 July 2026
19:00 (21:00 UTC+4)

Dinamo Tbilisi (Georgia (country))	3–0	(Lithuania) Žalgiris
Kurdić 14'; Léo Santos 26'; Ugrekhelidze 30'	Report

Mikheil Meskhi Stadium, Tbilisi
Attendance: 4,728
Referee: Robin Hensgens (Netherlands)
30 July 2026
19:00 (20:00 UTC+3)

Žalgiris (Lithuania)	7–2	(Georgia (country)) Dinamo Tbilisi
Bilenkyi 25', 82', 90'; Petković 59', 73'; Teixeira 71'; Mihajlović 88'	Report	Léo Santos 40'; Vatsadze 72'

LFF Stadium, Vilnius
Attendance: 4,722
Referee: Vlatko Ilioski (North Macedonia)

Žalgiris won 7–5 on aggregate.

23 July 2026
20:00

Aluminij (Slovenia)	1–1	(Albania) Dinamo City
Vrbanec 83'	Report	Berisha 15'

Ljudski vrt, Maribor (Note: Aluminij played their home match at Ljudski Vrt in Maribor instead of their regular stadium, Aluminij Sports Park in Kidričevo, which did not fulfil UEFA requirements.)
Attendance: 1,005
Referee: Ivar Orri Kristjansson (Iceland)
30 July 2026
21:00

Dinamo City (Albania)	3–0	(Slovenia) Aluminij
Vila 24'; Qefalija 43'; Përndreca 77'	Report

Elbasan Arena, Elbasan
Attendance: 682
Referee: Kamal Umudlu (Azerbaijan)

Dinamo City won 4–1 on aggregate.

23 July 2026
18:30

DAC Dunajská Streda (Slovakia)	1–0	(Bosnia and Herzegovina) Velež Mostar
Gagua 59' (pen.)	Report

MOL Aréna, Dunajská Streda
Attendance: 4,923
Referee: Stefan Ebner (Austria)
30 July 2026
19:00

Velež Mostar (Bosnia and Herzegovina)	0–3	(Slovakia) DAC Dunajská Streda
	Report	Ramadan 22', 38'; Gueye 90+2'

Stadion Bilino Polje, Zenica
Attendance: 2,263
Referee: Artem Gasparyan (Armenia)

DAC Dunajská Streda won 4–0 on aggregate.

23 July 2026
19:00 (21:00 UTC+4)

BATE Borisov (Belarus)	1–1	(Switzerland) Sion
Varaksa 16'	Report	Nivokazi 42'

Sumgayit City Stadium, Sumgait, Azerbaijan
Attendance: 0
Referee: Miloš Savović (Montenegro)
30 July 2026
20:15

Sion (Switzerland)	4–0	(Belarus) BATE Borisov
Boteli 5'; Nivokazi 38'; Batata 58'; Berdayes 68'	Report

Stade Tourbillon, Sion
Attendance: 6,500
Referee: Joakim Östling (Sweden)

Sion won 5–1 on aggregate.

23 July 2026
21:00 (19:00 UTC)

Stjarnan (Iceland)	1–0	(Finland) Ilves
Nökkvason 84'	Report

Stjörnuvöllur, Garðabær
Attendance: 591
Referee: Oscar Johnson (Sweden)
30 July 2026
18:00 (19:00 UTC+3)

Ilves (Finland)	2–1 (a.e.t.)	(Iceland) Stjarnan
Kilo 52'; Miettunen 113'	Report	Krkalić 107' (o.g.)
Penalties
Riski (penalty scored); Popvitch (penalty scored); Ala-Myllymäki (penalty scored); Tamminen (penalty scored); Kanga (penalty scored)	5–4	(penalty missed) Bjarnason; (penalty scored) Nökkvason; (penalty scored) Gunnarsson; (penalty scored) Vilhjálmsson; (penalty scored) Matthíasson

Tammelan Stadion, Tampere
Attendance: 4,201
Referee: Mervan Bejtullahu (Kosovo)

2–2 on aggregate; Ilves won 5–4 on penalties.

23 July 2026
20:45 (19:45 UTC+1)

Motherwell (Scotland)	2–0	(Faroe Islands) HB
Moormann 15'; Fadinger 57'	Report

Fir Park, Motherwell
Attendance: 7,767
Referee: Patryk Gryckiewicz (Poland)
30 July 2026
19:00 (18:00 UTC+1)

HB (Faroe Islands)	0–3	(Scotland) Motherwell
	Report	Fadinger 25' (pen.); Charles-Cook 36'; Williams 50'

Gundadalur, Tórshavn
Attendance: 1,050
Referee: Joonas Jaanovits (Estonia)

Motherwell won 5–0 on aggregate.

23 July 2026
17:30 (18:30 UTC+3)

Panevėžys (Lithuania)	1–1	(Kazakhstan) Tobol
Keita 45'	Report	Cavnić 84'

Aukštaitija Stadium, Panevėžys
Attendance: 1,872
Referee: Mohammad Usman Aslam (Norway)
30 July 2026
16:00 (19:00 UTC+5)

Tobol (Kazakhstan)	1–1 (a.e.t.)	(Lithuania) Panevėžys
Talal 45+3'	Report	Petkevičius 33'
Penalties
Guerra (penalty scored); Cavnić (penalty scored); Tagybergen (penalty scored); Ndiaye (penalty missed); Asrankulov (penalty missed)	3–2	(penalty missed) Rasimavičius; (penalty scored) Ramanauskas; (penalty scored) Kurtsev; (penalty missed) Keita; (penalty missed) Bačanin

Kostanay Central Stadium, Kostanay
Attendance: 5,837
Referee: Denys Shurman (Ukraine)

2–2 on aggregate; Tobol won 3–2 on penalties.

23 July 2026
16:30

Malisheva (Kosovo)	2–0	(Scotland) Hibernian
Uka 21'; Nafiu 90'	Report

Fadil Vokrri Stadium, Pristina (Note: Malisheva played their second qualifying round home match at Fadil Vokrri Stadium in Pristina, rather than at their regular home ground, the Liman Gegaj Stadium in Malisheva.)
Attendance: 2,873
Referee: Romain Lissorgue (France)
30 July 2026
21:00 (20:00 UTC+1)

Hibernian (Scotland)	4–1	(Kosovo) Malisheva
Elding 9'; Passlack 15'; Lowe 37'; Boyle 57'	Report	Bajraktari 83'

Easter Road, Edinburgh
Attendance: 15,182
Referee: Mihály Káprály (Hungary)

Hibernian won 4–3 on aggregate.

22 July 2026
18:00 (20:00 UTC+4)

Neftçi (Azerbaijan)	2–4	(Belarus) Dinamo Minsk
Mahmudov 2'; Selyava 8' (o.g.)	Report	Vardanyan 36', 57'; Malashevich 47'; Alykulov 77'

Neftçi Arena, Baku
Attendance: 7,684
Referee: Konstantinos Fellas (Cyprus)
30 July 2026
19:00 (20:00 UTC+3)

Dinamo Minsk (Belarus)	0–1	(Azerbaijan) Neftçi
	Report	Almeida 12'

Stadion Beroe, Stara Zagora, Bulgaria
Attendance: 40
Referee: Tim Marshall (Northern Ireland)

Dinamo Minsk won 4–3 on aggregate.

23 July 2026
20:00

Paks (Hungary)	1–2	(Greece) Panathinaikos
Böde 71'	Report	Vas 41' (o.g.); Andino 55'

Fehérvári úti Stadion, Paks
Attendance: 3,524
Referee: Luka Bilbija (Bosnia and Herzegovina)
30 July 2026
20:30 (21:30 UTC+3)

Panathinaikos (Greece)	2–2	(Hungary) Paks
Jagušić 44'; Rastoder 85'	Report	Pető 35'; Győrfi 57'

Olympic Stadium, Athens
Attendance: 22,414
Referee: Marc Nagtegaal (Netherlands)

Panathinaikos won 4–3 on aggregate.

22 July 2026
21:00

Železničar Pančevo (Serbia)	0–1	(Portugal) Braga
	Report	Horta 67' (pen.)

SC Mladost Stadium, Pančevo
Attendance: 2,824
Referee: Mehmet Türkmen (Turkey)
30 July 2026
21:00 (20:00 UTC+1)

Braga (Portugal)	4–0	(Serbia) Železničar Pančevo
Horta 27' (pen.); Silva 44'; Víctor 63'; Navarro 85'	Report

Estádio Municipal, Braga
Attendance: 12,312
Referee: Dalibor Černý (Czech Republic)

Braga won 5–0 on aggregate.

23 July 2026
20:00

Vojvodina (Serbia)	1–4	(Netherlands) Ajax
Sukačev 28'	Report	Klaassen 3'; Berghuis 38'; Gloukh 58'; Abdalla 90+3'

Stadion Karađorđe, Novi Sad
Attendance: 7,473
Referee: Miguel Nogueira (Portugal)
30 July 2026
20:00

Ajax (Netherlands)	4–1	(Serbia) Vojvodina
Klaassen 44'; Gloukh 53', 58', 71'	Report	Crnomarković 40'

Johan Cruyff Arena, Amsterdam
Attendance: 51,251
Referee: Christos Vergetis (Greece)

Ajax won 8–2 on aggregate.

23 July 2026
20:00

Polissya Zhytomyr (Ukraine)	3–3	(Denmark) Copenhagen
Krasnopir 6'; Fedor 36'; Filippov 88'	Report	Robert 4', 55'; Madsen 83'

Košická futbalová aréna, Košice, Slovakia (Note: Due to the Russian invasion of Ukraine, Ukrainian teams were required to play their home matches at neutral venues until further notice.)
Attendance: 2,268
Referee: David Da Silva (Portugal)
29 July 2026
19:00

Copenhagen (Denmark)	2–1	(Ukraine) Polissya Zhytomyr
Elyounoussi 27' (pen.); Robert 61'	Report	Hayduchyk 90+3'

Parken Stadium, Copenhagen
Attendance: 20,541
Referee: Marek Radina (Czech Republic)

Copenhagen won 5–4 on aggregate.

23 July 2026
20:30

LNZ Cherkasy (Ukraine)	0–0	(Belgium) Gent
	Report

Kazimierz Górski Stadium, Płock, Poland
Attendance: 920
Referee: Granit Maqedonci (Sweden)
30 July 2026
20:30

Gent (Belgium)	0–0 (a.e.t.)	(Ukraine) LNZ Cherkasy
	Report
Penalties
Kadri (penalty scored); De Vlieger (penalty scored); Leonardo Lopes (penalty scored); Sonko (penalty scored)	4–2	(penalty scored) Talles; (penalty missed) Tverdokhlib; (penalty scored) Kravchuk; (penalty missed) Kuzyk

Planet Group Arena, Ghent
Attendance: 9,674
Referee: Genc Nuza (Kosovo)

0–0 on aggregate; Gent won 4–2 on penalties.

23 July 2026
19:00

FC Santa Coloma (Andorra)	1–3	(Austria) Rapid Wien
Muñoz 54'	Report	Raux-Yao 50'; Demir 56'; Haïdara 89'

Estadi Nacional, Andorra la Vella
Attendance: 627
Referee: Matthew MacDermid (Scotland)
29 July 2026
20:30

Rapid Wien (Austria)	6–2	(Andorra) FC Santa Coloma
Kara 10', 33', 63'; Dahl 24'; Cvetković 58'; Wurmbrand 82'	Report	Guti 30'; Abreu 87'

Allianz Stadion, Vienna
Attendance: 13,208
Referee: Visar Kastrati (Kosovo)

Rapid Wien won 9–3 on aggregate.

23 July 2026
20:30

Hapoel Tel Aviv (Israel)	2–0	(Bulgaria) Ludogorets Razgrad
Altman 45'; Chico 89'	Report

Diósgyőri Stadion, Miskolc, Hungary (Note: Due to the Gaza war, Israeli teams were required to play their home matches at neutral venues until further notice.)
Attendance: 3,944
Referee: Alessandro Dudic (Switzerland)
30 July 2026
20:00 (21:00 UTC+3)

Ludogorets Razgrad (Bulgaria)	2–2	(Israel) Hapoel Tel Aviv
Tekpetey 47'; Salido 54'	Report	Boateng 16', 58'

Huvepharma Arena, Razgrad
Attendance: 5,632
Referee: Sayat Karabayev (Kazakhstan)

Hapoel Tel Aviv won 4–2 on aggregate.

23 July 2026
17:00 (19:00 UTC+4)

Alashkert (Armenia)	1–1	(Romania) CFR Cluj
Rafael Jesus 35'	Report	Sfait 47'

Yerevan Football Academy Stadium, Yerevan
Attendance: 1,152
Referee: Eldorjan Hamiti (Albania)
30 July 2026
20:30 (21:30 UTC+3)

CFR Cluj (Romania)	3–0	(Armenia) Alashkert
Muhar 3'; Korenica 45'; Fica 77'	Report

Stadionul Dr. Constantin Rădulescu, Cluj-Napoca
Attendance: 5,465
Referee: Vilhjálmur Þórarinsson (Iceland)

CFR Cluj won 4–1 on aggregate.

22 July 2026
19:00 (18:00 UTC+1)

Bohemians (Republic of Ireland)	2–1	(Kosovo) Ballkani
James-Taylor 76'; Tierney 90'	Report	Domgjoni 29' (pen.)

Dalymount Park, Dublin
Attendance: 3,648
Referee: Jakob Semler (Austria)
30 July 2026
20:00

Ballkani (Kosovo)	3–2 (a.e.t.)	(Republic of Ireland) Bohemians
Serebe 10'; Giovanni 50'; Domgjoni 58'	Report	James-Taylor 20' (pen.); Hickey 88'
Penalties
Jashanica (penalty missed); Ismailgeci (penalty scored); Berisha (penalty scored); Diène (penalty scored); Dosso (penalty scored)	4–5	(penalty scored) Whelan; (penalty scored) Devoy; (penalty scored) Byrne; (penalty scored) Rooney; (penalty scored) Flores

Stadiumi Fadil Vokrri, Pristina
Attendance: 867
Referee: Volen Chinkov (Bulgaria)

4–4 on aggregate; Bohemians won 5–4 on penalties.

23 July 2026
18:00 (19:00 UTC+3)

Paide Linnameeskond (Estonia)	1–0	(Azerbaijan) Zira
Cham 87'	Report

Pärnu Rannastaadion, Pärnu
Attendance: 943
Referee: Roman Jitari (Moldova)
30 July 2026
18:00 (20:00 UTC+4)

Zira (Azerbaijan)	1–1	(Estonia) Paide Linnameeskond
Aydın 5'	Report	Anier 71'

Sumgayit City Stadium, Sumgait
Attendance: 1,500
Referee: Dario Bel (Croatia)

Paide Linnameeskond won 2–1 on aggregate.

23 July 2026
19:30

Vaduz (Liechtenstein)	4–0	(Andorra) Atlètic Club d'Escaldes
Eberhard 11', 54'; Cabrera 80'; Sorgić 89'	Report

Rheinpark Stadion, Vaduz
Attendance: 1,403
Referee: Dumitri Muntean (Moldova)
30 July 2026
16:00

Atlètic Club d'Escaldes (Andorra)	0–2	(Liechtenstein) Vaduz
	Report	Djokic 9'; Simani 73'

Estadi Nacional, Andorra la Vella
Attendance: 100
Referee: Dominik Starý (Czech Republic)

Vaduz won 6–0 on aggregate.

22 July 2026
20:30

Spartak Trnava (Slovakia)	0–0	(Bulgaria) CSKA 1948
	Report

Anton Malatinský Stadium, Trnava
Attendance: 10,164
Referee: Mathieu Vernice (France)
28 July 2026
19:30 (20:30 UTC+3)

CSKA 1948 (Bulgaria)	0–0 (a.e.t.)	(Slovakia) Spartak Trnava
	Report
Penalties
Dvali (penalty scored); Franco (penalty scored); Cuéllar (penalty scored); Maciel (penalty scored); A. Iliev (penalty scored)	5–3	(penalty scored) Gong; (penalty scored) Koštrna; (penalty missed) Laušić; (penalty scored) Bukovský

Vasil Levski National Stadium, Sofia (Note: CSKA 1948 played their second qualifying round home match at Vasil Levski National Stadium in Sofia, rather than at their regular home ground, Stadion Bistritsa in Bistritsa, which did not fulfil UEFA requirements.)
Attendance: 472
Referee: Walter Altmann (Austria)

0–0 on aggregate; CSKA 1948 won 5–3 on penalties.

23 July 2026
20:45 (19:45 UTC+1)

NSÍ (Faroe Islands)	0–2	(Slovenia) Koper
	Report	Irabor 82', 85'

Við Djúpumýrar, Klaksvík
Attendance: 752
Referee: Igor Bosca (Moldova)
30 July 2026
20:45

Koper (Slovenia)	1–3 (a.e.t.)	(Faroe Islands) NSÍ
N'Diaye 102' (pen.)	Report	Nolsøe 35'; Lindh 70'; Przybylski 120+2'
Penalties
Iličić (penalty missed); N'Diaye (penalty scored); Roncal (penalty missed); Manseri (penalty scored); Longonda (penalty scored); Damjanović (penalty missed)	3–4	(penalty missed) P. Knudsen; (penalty scored) Benjaminsen; (penalty missed) Davidsen; (penalty scored) Elísson; (penalty scored) K. Olsen; (penalty scored) Obbekjær

Bonifika Stadium, Koper
Attendance: 978
Referee: Matthias Jöllenbeck (Germany)

3–3 on aggregate; NSÍ won 4–3 on penalties.

23 July 2026
18:30 (19:30 UTC+3)

AEK Larnaca (Cyprus)	0–1	(Israel) Beitar Jerusalem
	Report	Carabalí 77'

AEK Arena – Georgios Karapatakis, Larnaca
Attendance: 4,227
Referee: Eric Wattellier (France)
30 July 2026
19:30 (20:30 UTC+3)

Beitar Jerusalem (Israel)	2–3 (a.e.t.)	(Cyprus) AEK Larnaca
Atzili 45+2' (pen.), 88'	Report	Miličević 26' (pen.), 52'; Bajić 90+2'
Penalties
Carabalí (penalty scored); Ansah (penalty scored); Y. Cohen (penalty scored); Muzie (penalty scored)	4–3	(penalty scored) Miličević; (penalty scored) Ivanović; (penalty missed) Rubio; (penalty scored) Pileas; (penalty missed) Kyriakou

Stadionul Ilie Oană, Ploiești, Romania
Attendance: 2,651
Referee: Fabio Verissimo (Portugal)

3–3 on aggregate; Beitar Jerusalem won 4–3 on penalties.

23 July 2026
21:00

Partizan (Serbia)	4–0	(Luxembourg) UNA Strassen
Kojzek 5'; Agović 29' (o.g.); Zubairu 68'; Ugrešić 80'	Report

Partizan Stadium, Belgrade
Attendance: 10,637
Referee: Daniyar Sakhi (Kazakhstan)
30 July 2026
20:15

UNA Strassen (Luxembourg)	0–1	(Serbia) Partizan
	Report	Kostić 48'

Stade de Luxembourg, Luxembourg City
Attendance: 2,283
Referee: Ben McMaster (Northern Ireland)

Partizan won 5–0 on aggregate.
