= Enock Otoo =

Ghanaian footballer (born 2004)

Personal information
- Full name: Enock Kofi Otoo
- Date of birth: 28 June 2004 (age 22)
- Place of birth: Gomoa Nsuaem, Ghana
- Height: 1.75 m (5 ft 9 in)
- Position: Attacking midfielder

Team information
- Current team: Levadia
- Number: 33

Youth career
- 2014–2022: Right to Dream
- 2022–2024: Nordsjælland
- 2024: Lyngby

Senior career*
Years	Team	Apps	(Gls)
2024–2025	Lyngby	5	(0)
2025–	Levadia	53	(10)
- * Club domestic league appearances and goals as of 17 November 2026

Enock Kofi Otoo (born 28 June 2004) is a Ghanaian footballer who plays as a midfielder for Estonian Meistriliiga club FCI Levadia Tallinn.

== Club career ==
=== FC Nordsjælland ===
Otoo joined FC Nordsjælland from the Right to Dream Academy in the summer 2022. Despite good performances in the U19 team, Otoo struggled to break through to the first team and was only on the bench once in the Danish Superliga, but without making his debut.

=== Lyngby BK ===
On 26 January 2024, Otoo moved to Danish Superliga club Lyngby Boldklub, where he signed a deal until June 2027. On 18 January 2024, Otoo made his debut for Lyngby in a league match against his former club, FC Nordsjælland, where he was in the starting lineup.

After just 4 appearances for Lyngby in his first half year at the club, and 0 minutes in the first six games of 2024–25, it was rumored in the media that Otoo and Lyngby were working on finding a new club for the former. During the first 10 games of the 2024–25 season, Otoo played a total of just 15 minutes for Lyngby, which was in a Danish Cup match against BK Frem, and was also only selected for three Danish Superliga matches, where he was an unused substitute in all three.

=== Levadia ===
On 6 January 2025, it was confirmed that Otoo transferred to Estonian Meistriliiga club FCI Levadia Tallinn. It was not reported how long a contract Otoo had been given.
