= Gomoa Nsuaem =

Town In Central Region, Ghana

Gomoa Nsuaem is a small village located within the Gomoa East District in the Central Region of Ghana. The area forms part of the broader Gomoa traditional area, which is predominantly inhabited by the Fante subgroup of the Akan people.

== History ==
Gomoa Nsuaem, also known historically as Kwaakwatsia, traces its origins to the wider migration history of the Fante and Gomoa peoples. Oral traditions among the Fante and Gomoa indicate that their ancestors originally lived in Takyiman (present-day Bono East Region) before migrating southwards into the Central Region of Ghana. After a prolonged stay at Mankessim, population growth and other socio-economic pressures compelled sections of the group to move eastwards in search of new settlements.

== Socio-Economic Activities ==
Gomoa Nsuaem's residents engage primarily in agriculture, including crop farming and small-scale trading, which are typical economic activities in many Central Region rural communities.

== Conflicts ==
In April 2022, a group of farmers in Gomoa Nsuaem protested the ongoing sale of farmland in their community, which they said was affecting their ability to cultivate crops. The farmers reported that several acres of agricultural land had been sold to private developers, and as a result, their traditional access routes to farm plots were blocked by fences erected by the buyers.

The protestors, who wore red armbands as a sign of their displeasure, described how continued land sales by local leaders were causing economic hardship and cited difficulty reaching their farms to harvest crops for sale.

== Crown Forest Eco Park ==
The Crown Forest eco-tourism and wildlife development initiative located is at Gomoa Nsuaem. The forest is developed by Crown Forest Limited and was publicly commissioned in 2017 as a safari-style eco-park and tourism destination. The park sits on an 820-acre tract of land in Gomoa Nsuaem and it is described as a 500-acre safari eco-park, intended to house a variety of wildlife species such as zebras, giraffes, impalas, waterbucks and other game animals. The Forest also has Bon Crown Hotel which accommodate visitors to the Park.
