= 2021–22 Football Superleague of Kosovo =

Football Superleague of Kosovo
- Season: 2021–22
- Dates: 21 August 2021 – 22 May 2022
- Champions: Ballkani
- Relegated: Ulpiana; Feronikeli
- Champions League: Ballkani
- Europa Conference League: Drita; Gjilani; Llapi
- Matches: 180
- Goals: 463 (2.57 per match)
- Top goalscorer: Gerhard Progni (23 goals)
- Biggest home win: Drita 7–0 Feronikeli (12 February 2022)
- Biggest away win: Ulpiana 0–6 Llapi (19 October 2021)
- Highest scoring: Drenica 3–5 Llapi (25 November 2021); Ulpiana 6–2 Feronikeli (15 May 2022)
- All statistics correct as of 22 May 2022.

The 2021–22 Football Superleague of Kosovo season, also known as the BKT Superleague of Kosovo (Albanian: BKT Superliga e Kosovës) for sponsorship reasons with Banka Kombëtare Tregtare was the 23rd season of top-tier football in Kosovo. The season began on 21 August 2021 and ended on 22 May 2022. A total of 10 teams are competing in the league: seven teams from the 2020–21 season and three teams from the 2020–21 First Football League of Kosovo. Prishtina are the defending champions from the previous season.

== Teams ==
Ten teams will compete in the league – the top seven teams from the previous season and the three teams promoted from the First Football League of Kosovo. The promoted teams are Malisheva, Ulpiana and Dukagjini. They will replace Trepça '89, Arbëria and Besa Pejë.

=== Stadiums and locations ===
Locations of the 2021–22 Football Superleague of Kosovo teams

Note: Table lists in alphabetical order.

Club	Town	Stadium and capacity		UEFA license
Ballkani	Suva Reka	Suva Reka City Stadium	1,500	Yes
Drenica	Skenderaj	Bajram Aliu Stadium	3,000	No
Drita	Gjilan	Gjilan City Stadium	15,000	Yes
Dukagjini	Klina	18 June Stadium	3,000	No
Feronikeli	Drenas	Rexhep Rexhepi Stadium	2,000	No
Gjilani	Gjilan	Gjilan City Stadium	15,000	Yes
Llapi	Podujevo	Zahir Pajaziti Stadium	10,000	Yes
Malisheva	Mališevo	Liman Gegaj Stadium	2,000	No
Prishtina	Pristina	Fadil Vokrri Stadium	13,000	Yes
Ulpiana	Lipljan	Qatiq Bytyqi Stadium	2,000	No

=== Personnel and kits ===
Team	Manager	Captain	Kit manufacturer	Shirt sponsor		
Ballkani	(Albania) Ilir Daja	(Kosovo) Arbër Potoku	Uhlsport	Cima Construction		
Drenica	(Kosovo) Tahir Lushtaku	(Kosovo) Arbios Thaçi	Givova	ILEAA-GR		
Drita	(North Macedonia) Ardian Nuhiu	(Kosovo) Ardian Limani	Macron	JB Automotive AG	Rinora4	Valon AG
Dukagjini	(Albania) Armend Dallku	(Kosovo) Altin Merlaku	Macron	Mirusha Company		
Feronikeli	(Kosovo) Faruk Elshani	(Kosovo) Endrit Kastrati	Macron	Porto Budva		
Gjilani	(Kosovo) Alban Hyseni	(Albania) Gerhard Progni	Joma	Tali SH.P.K		
Llapi	(Kosovo) Tahir Batatina	(Kosovo) Bujar Idrizi	Macron	FF Bauunternehmung		
Malisheva	(Kosovo) Arsim Thaqi	(Kosovo) Dren Kryeziu	Givova	Patroni		
Prishtina	(Albania) Debatik Curri	(Kosovo) Lorik Boshnjaku	Jako	JYSK Kosovo	NLB Banka Prishtina	Rio Mare
Ulpiana	(Kosovo) Fadil Ademi	(Kosovo) Shqiprim Kelmendi	LiG	Bageri Company	Dino Company	Urban Center

=== Managerial changes ===
Team	Outgoing manager	Manner of departure	Date of vacancy	Pos	Incoming manager	Date of appointment
Prishtina	(North Macedonia) Zekirija Ramadani	Sacked	14 November 2021	6th	(Bosnia and Herzegovina) Abdulah Ibraković	14 November 2021
Ballkani	(Kosovo) Bekim Isufi	Sacked	21 November 2021	3rd	(Albania) Ilir Daja	5 January 2022
Ulpiana	(Albania) Edlir Tetova	Sacked	28 March 2022	9th	(Kosovo) Fadil Ademi	28 March 2022
Gjilani	(Kosovo) Ismet Munishi	Sacked	25 April 2022	3rd	(Kosovo) Alban Hyseni	25 April 2022
Prishtina	(Bosnia and Herzegovina) Abdulah Ibraković	Mutual consent	14 May 2022	5th	(Albania) Debatik Curri	14 May 2022

== League table ==
Pos	Team	Pld	W	D	L	GF	GA	GD	Pts	Qualification or relegation
1	Ballkani (C)	36	23	7	6	61	26	+35	76	Qualification for the Champions League first qualifying round
2	Drita	36	18	10	8	56	25	+31	64	Qualification for the Europa Conference League first qualifying round
3	Gjilani	36	16	14	6	57	36	+21	62	Qualification for the Europa Conference League first qualifying round
4	Llapi	36	15	9	12	57	44	+13	54	Qualification for the Europa Conference League first qualifying round
5	Prishtina	36	14	9	13	49	37	+12	51	
6	Drenica	36	14	8	14	51	48	+3	50 (Note: Head-to-head points: Drenica 9, Dukagjini 3.)	
7	Dukagjini	36	12	14	10	37	34	+3	50	
8	Malisheva (O)	36	13	9	14	45	43	+2	48	Qualification for the relegation play-offs
9	Ulpiana (R)	36	6	9	21	34	72	−38	27	Relegation to First Football League of Kosovo
10	Feronikeli (R)	36	3	3	30	16	98	−82	12	Relegation to First Football League of Kosovo

Source: Football Federation of Kosovo (in Albanian), TopSporti (in Albanian)
Rules for classification: 1) Points; 2) Head-to-head points; 3) Head-to-head goal difference; 4) Goal difference; 5) Goals scored; 6) Play-offs (only if needed to decide champions, teams for relegation or teams for UEFA competitions).
(C) Champions; (O) Play-off winners; (R) Relegated

== Results ==
=== First half of season ===
Home \ Away	BAL	DRE	DRI	DUK	FER	GJI	LLA	MAL	PRI	ULP
Ballkani	—	3–2	2–0	2–2	0–0	0–1	2–0	2–0	2–0	3–2
Drenica	0–1	—	0–2	2–0	4–0	1–1	3–5	1–0	2–1	0–1
Drita	0–0	1–0	—	4–0	2–1	0–2	0–0	1–0	0–0	3–1
Dukagjini	0–0	1–2	2–1	—	1–0	1–1	0–0	2–0	1–2	1–1
Feronikeli	0–1	0–2	0–2	1–0	—	0–1	0–2	0–1	0–4	1–0
Gjilani	1–1	2–1	1–0	0–0	1–0	—	2–1	3–1	1–1	2–3
Llapi	4–1	1–1	1–3	1–0	0–2	0–0	—	0–3	3–2	1–1
Malisheva	0–0	2–0	0–1	2–2	1–0	1–1	0–1	—	1–1	1–2
Prishtina	0–1	1–0	0–1	0–0	2–0	1–1	1–2	2–1	—	1–1
Ulpiana	2–1	0–1	1–1	0–0	0–0	1–2	0–6	1–3	0–3	—

Source: Soccerway
Legend: Blue = home team win; Yellow = draw; Red = away team win.
For upcoming matches, an "a" indicates there is an article about the rivalry between the two participants.

=== Second half of season ===
Home \ Away	BAL	DRE	DRI	DUK	FER	GJI	LLA	MAL	PRI	ULP
Ballkani	—	2–0	3–2	4–1	6–0	2–0	1–0	2–3	2–0	3–0
Drenica	3–1	—	2–1	0–1	6–0	1–1	1–0	2–3	0–0	3–1
Drita	0–1	1–1	—	0–0	7–0	1–1	1–1	3–1	2–0	5–0
Dukagjini	0–1	1–2	0–0	—	4–0	2–0	3–2	0–0	2–1	2–1
Feronikeli	0–2	2–3	0–5	0–3	—	1–3	0–2	0–2	0–3	2–2
Gjilani	0–3	5–0	0–0	2–1	5–1	—	1–1	3–4	1–2	2–0
Llapi	1–1	3–3	1–0	1–2	4–2	2–4	—	3–0	1–2	2–0
Malisheva	2–0	0–0	1–2	0–0	6–1	0–0	0–2	—	2–1	1–0
Prishtina	0–2	1–1	0–1	0–1	5–0	2–2	2–1	3–2	—	2–0
Ulpiana	0–3	3–1	2–3	1–1	6–2	0–4	0–2	1–1	0–3	—

Source: Soccerway
Legend: Blue = home team win; Yellow = draw; Red = away team win.
For upcoming matches, an "a" indicates there is an article about the rivalry between the two participants.

=== Positions by round ===
The table lists the positions of teams after each week of matches.

Team ╲ Round	1	2	3	4	5	6	7	8	9	10	11	12	13	14	15	16	17	18	19	20	21	22	23	24	25	26	27	28	29	30	31	32	33	34	35	36
Ballkani	3	2	1	2	1	1	2	1	2	1	1	2	1	3	2	1	1	3	2	1	1	1	1	1	1	1	1	1	1	1	1	1	1	1	1	1
Drenica	5	3	2	1	4	4	1	2	1	2	2	4	4	5	6	6	6	6	6	5	5	5	5	5	7	7	6	6	7	7	7	8	8	8	7	6
Drita	1	4	3	3	2	3	5	5	4	4	4	1	3	2	3	3	3	2	1	3	3	3	3	3	3	3	2	2	3	2	2	3	3	3	3	2
Dukagjini	2	7	7	8	9	9	8	8	8	8	8	9	8	9	8	9	9	8	8	9	9	9	8	8	8	8	8	8	8	8	6	6	6	6	5	7
Feronikeli	10	10	6	5	5	7	7	7	7	9	10	10	10	10	10	10	10	10	10	10	10	10	10	10	10	10	10	10	10	10	10	10	10	10	10	10
Gjilani	7	5	4	6	6	5	3	3	3	3	3	3	2	1	1	2	2	1	3	2	2	2	2	2	2	2	3	3	2	3	3	2	2	2	2	3
Llapi	6	6	8	9	10	10	10	10	9	7	7	6	5	4	4	4	4	4	4	4	4	4	4	4	4	4	4	4	4	4	4	4	4	4	4	4
Malisheva	8	1	5	4	3	2	4	4	5	6	6	8	9	8	9	7	7	7	7	7	7	7	7	7	6	5	7	7	6	6	8	7	7	7	8	8
Prishtina	4	8	9	7	7	6	6	6	6	5	5	5	6	6	5	5	5	5	5	6	6	6	6	6	5	6	5	5	5	5	5	5	5	5	6	5
Ulpiana	9	9	10	10	8	8	9	9	10	10	9	7	7	7	7	8	8	9	9	8	8	8	9	9	9	9	9	9	9	9	9	9	9	9	9	9

Leader and Champions League first qualifying round
Europa Conference League first qualifying round
Relegation play-offs
2022–23 First Football League of Kosovo

Source: Football Federation of Kosovo (in Albanian)

=== Relegation play-offs ===
28 May 2022
16:00

Vushtrria	1–3	Malisheva
Gashi 90+17'	Report	Marc-Olivier 17'; Pefqeli 26', 90+4' (pen.)

Zahir Pajaziti Stadium, Podujevo, Kosovo
Referee: Gramos Shala (Kosovo)

== Season statistics and awards ==
- First goal of the season: (Brazil) Denisson Silva for Drenica against Gjilani (21 August 2021).
- Last goal of the season: (Kosovo) Almir Ajzeraj for Drita against Ulpiana (22 May 2021).

=== Top scorers ===
As of 15 July 2022

#	Player	Club	Goals
1	(Albania) Gerhard Progni	Gjilani	23
2	(Kosovo) Kreshnik Uka	Drenica	20
3	(North Macedonia) Marko Simonovski	Drita	15
3	(Kosovo) Ermal Krasniqi	Ballkani	15
5	(Kosovo) Besnik Krasniqi	Prishtina	11
6	(Kosovo) Valmir Veliu	Llapi	10
7	(Kosovo) Ardit Tahiri	Drita	9
7	(Kosovo) Altin Merlaku	Dukagjini	9
7	(Albania) Blerim Krasniqi	Gjilani	9
10	(England) Ronald Sobowale	Malisheva	8

=== Top assisters ===
As of 30 April 2022

#	Player	Club	Assists
1	(Albania) Nazmi Gripshi	Ballkani	8
1	(Kosovo) Kastriot Selmani	Llapi	8
2	(Kosovo) Valmir Veliu	Llapi	7
3	(Kosovo) Genc Hamiti	Drenica	6
3	(Kosovo) Ilir Blakçori	Drita	6
4	(Kosovo) Armend Thaqi	Ballkani	5
4	(Kosovo) Muharrem Jashari	Drita	5
4	(Kosovo) Ergyn Ahmeti	Dukagjini	5
4	(Brazil) Elton Calé	Gjilani	5
4	(England) Yoan Marc-Olivier	Malisheva	5
5	(Kosovo) Ermal Krasniqi	Ballkani	4

=== Hat-tricks ===
Player	For	Against	Result	Date	Round
(Kosovo) Kreshnik Uka	Drenica	Llapi	3–5 (H)	25 November 2021	15
(Kosovo) Hamdi Namani	Drita	Feronikeli	7–0 (H)	12 February 2022	19
(Kosovo) Kreshnik Uka	Drenica	Feronikeli	6–0 (H)	3 April 2022	27
(Albania) Gerhard Progni	Gjilani	Ulpiana	0–4 (A)	30 April 2022	32
(Ghana) Sadam Sulley	Prishtina	Feronikeli	5–0 (H)	4 May 2022	33
(Albania) Blerim Krasniqi	Gjilani	Llapi	2–4 (A)	8 May 2022	34
(Kosovo) Altin Merlaku	Dukagjini	Llapi	3–2 (H)	15 May 2022	35

=== "Star of the Week" Award ===
Week	Player	Club	Ref	Week	Player	Club	Ref
1	It is not awarded			19	(Kosovo) Hamdi Namani	Drita	
2	(Kosovo) Ermal Krasniqi	Ballkani		20	(Kosovo) Genc Hamiti	Drenica	
3	(Kosovo) Ardit Tahiri	Drita		21	(Kosovo) Blendi Baftiu	Ballkani	
4	(Kosovo) Torvioll Stullqaku	Malisheva		22	(Kosovo) Valmir Veliu	Llapi	
5	(Brazil) Marclei	Ulpiana		23	(Kosovo) Fatlum Gashi	Drenica	
6	(Albania) Gerhard Progni	Gjilani		24	(Kosovo) Kreshnik Uka	Drenica	
7	(Albania) Ahmed Januzi	Dukagjini		25	(Kosovo) Hasan Hyseni	Malisheva	
8	(Kosovo) Armend Thaqi	Ballkani		26	(Albania) Ahmed Januzi	Dukagjini	
9	(Kosovo) Kreshnik Uka	Drenica		27	(North Macedonia) Marko Simonovski	Drita	
10	(Kosovo) Valmir Veliu	Llapi		28	(Democratic Republic of the Congo) Gauthier Mankenda	Prishtina	
11	(Kosovo) Ermal Krasniqi	Ballkani		29	(Kosovo) Ergyn Ahmeti	Dukagjini	
12	(Kosovo) Ardi Shala	Ulpiana		30	(Kosovo) Altin Merlaku	Dukagjini	
13	(Nigeria) Theophilus Solomon	Ballkani		31	(Kosovo) Ermal Krasniqi	Ballkani	
14	(Brazil) Alef Firmino	Llapi		32	(Albania) Gerhard Progni	Gjilani	
15	(Kosovo) Kreshnik Uka	Drenica		33	(Kosovo) Andi Thaqi	Ulpiana	
16	(Kosovo) Leotrim Kryeziu	Prishtina		34	(Kosovo) Altik Muhaxhiri	Dukagjini	
17	(North Macedonia) Marko Simonovski	Drita		35	(Kosovo) Altin Merlaku	Dukagjini	
18	(Albania) Gerhard Progni	Gjilani		36	(Kosovo) Altik Muhaxhiri	Dukagjini	

== Notes and references ==
=== Notes ===
1. This season was the 23rd season under the name Football Superleague of Kosovo, the 29th season of top-tier football in Kosovo and the 75th season of football in Kosovo overall.
2. The two teams, Drita and Gjilan, which use this stadium together with their fans, have named the stadium with different names. Drita and their fans named the stadium as Selami Osmani-Bezi Stadium, while Gjilan and their fans named the stadium as Agim Ramadani Stadium, but officially the stadium is named Gjilan City Stadium.

=== References ===
"Star of the Week" Award
