= 2018–19 Football Superleague of Kosovo =

Football Superleague of Kosovo
- Season: 2018–19
- Dates: 18 August 2018 – 19 May 2019
- Champions: Feronikeli
- Relegated: KEK-u; Liria
- Champions League: Feronikeli
- Europa League: Prishtina
- Matches: 195
- Goals: 481 (2.47 per match)
- Top goalscorer: Kastriot Rexha (21 goals)
- Biggest home win: Liria 6–2 KEK-u (16 September 2018)
- Biggest away win: KEK-u 1–5 Trepça'89 (12 September 2018)
- Highest scoring: Liria 6–2 KEK-u (16 September 2018)
- Longest winning run: 22 matches Prishtina
- Longest unbeaten run: 22 matches Prishtina
- Longest winless run: 32 matches KEK-u
- Longest losing run: 32 matches KEK-u
- All statistics correct as of 19 May 2019.

The 2018–19 Football Superleague of Kosovo season, also known as the IPKO Superleague of Kosovo (Albanian: IPKO Superliga e Kosovës) for sponsorship reasons with IPKO was the 20th season of top-tier football in Kosovo. The season began on 18 August 2018 and will end on 19 May 2019. A total of 12 teams are competing in the league: nine teams from the 2017–18 season and three teams from the 2017–18 First Football League of Kosovo. Drita are the defending champions from the previous season.

== Teams and stadiums ==
Locations of the 2018–19 Football Superleague of Kosovo teams

Besa Pejë and Vllaznia Pozheran were relegated after finishing the previous season in eleventh and twelfth-place respectively. They will be replaced by the champions and runners-up of the 2017–18 First League, Ballkani and KEK-u respectively. Ferizaj defeated Vëllaznimi in play-off to claim their top-flight spot.

Note: Table lists in alphabetical order.

Club	Town	Stadium and capacity		UEFA license
Ballkani	Suva Reka	Suva Reka City Stadium	1,500	No
Drenica	Skenderaj	Bajram Aliu Stadium	3,000	No
Drita	Gjilan	Gjilan City Stadium	15,000	Yes
Ferizaj	Ferizaj	Ferizaj Synthetic Grass Stadium	1,500	No
Feronikeli	Drenas	Rexhep Rexhepi Stadium	2,000	No
Flamurtari	Pristina	Xhemail Ibishi Stadium	5,000	No
Gjilani	Gjilan	Gjilan City Stadium	15,000	Yes
KEK-u	Obiliq	Agron Rama Stadium	5,000	No
Liria	Prizren	Përparim Thaçi Stadium	15,000	Yes
Llapi	Podujevo	Zahir Pajaziti Stadium	10,000	Yes
Prishtina	Pristina	Fadil Vokrri Stadium	13,000	Yes
Trepça'89	Mitrovica	Riza Lushta Stadium	12,000	Yes

== League table ==
Pos	Team	Pld	W	D	L	GF	GA	GD	Pts	Qualification or relegation
1	Feronikeli (C)	33	25	5	3	64	14	+50	80	Qualification for the Champions League preliminary round
2	Prishtina	33	23	6	4	49	12	+37	75	Qualification for the Europa League preliminary round (Note: Since the winners of the Kosovar Cup, Feronikeli, qualified for the Champions League, the spot given to the Cup winners was passed to the second-placed team.)
3	Llapi	33	22	3	8	54	24	+30	69	
4	Drita	33	14	6	13	47	39	+8	48	
5	Ferizaj	33	14	4	15	39	41	−2	46	
6	Flamurtari	33	12	9	12	33	39	−6	45	
7	Drenica	33	11	10	12	41	34	+7	43	
8	Ballkani	33	12	7	14	35	36	−1	43	
9	Trepça'89 (O)	33	11	9	13	40	45	−5	42	Qualification for the relegation play-offs
10	Gjilani (O)	33	10	8	15	28	37	−9	38	Qualification for the relegation play-offs
11	Liria (R)	33	8	4	21	31	60	−29	28	Relegation to First Football League of Kosovo
12	KEK-u (R)	33	0	1	32	24	104	−80	1	Relegation to First Football League of Kosovo

Source: Football Federation of Kosovo (in Albanian), Soccerway
Rules for classification: 1) Points; 2) Goal difference; 3) Goals scored; 4) Draw; 5) Head-to-head points; 6) Head-to-head goal difference; 7) Head-to-head away goals scored (only if between two teams); 8) Head-to-head goals scored; 9) Play-off (tie-breakers 2, 3 and 4 only used for ties that do not involve deciding the champion, play-offs participation or relegation).
(C) Champions; (O) Play-off winners; (R) Relegated

== Results ==
Each team plays three times against every opponent (either twice at home and once away or once at home and twice away) for a total of 33 games played each.

=== Matches 1–22 ===
Home \ Away	BAL	DRE	DRI	FZJ	FRN	FLA	GJI	KEK	LIR	LLA	PRI	T89
Ballkani	—	2–0	1–2	0–1	0–1	1–0	4–1	3–0	1–0	0–3	1–1	0–0
Drenica	2–1	—	1–2	3–1	0–0	1–1	0–0	5–1	1–0	0–2	0–1	3–0
Drita	6–1	2–0	—	1–0	1–1	1–3	3–1	5–0	0–1	1–2	1–0	1–1
Ferizaj	1–0	2–0	0–2	—	0–2	2–3	0–2	4–1	1–0	0–1	0–0	2–0
Feronikeli	1–0	2–1	4–0	2–0	—	2–0	3–0	4–1	4–2	2–0	0–1	1–1
Flamurtari	0–0	0–3	0–1	1–0	1–3	—	1–1	1–0	3–1	0–1	2–0	0–2
Gjilani	1–3	1–0	1–0	1–0	1–0	0–0	—	2–0	0–1	0–1	0–3	1–0
KEK-u	2–2	2–4	1–2	1–2	0–1	3–4	2–3	—	0–3	0–3	1–2	1–5
Liria	0–1	1–1	3–2	0–0	0–2	1–0	1–1	6–2	—	2–3	0–1	0–4
Llapi	0–1	0–1	1–0	5–1	0–1	0–0	3–1	2–0	1–0	—	1–0	3–1
Prishtina	2–0	1–0	2–0	0–0	1–1	1–1	1–0	3–0	4–0	2–1	—	2–0
Trepça'89	1–0	1–1	1–0	2–0	0–1	2–2	1–1	4–1	1–2	1–1	0–2	—

Source: Football Federation of Kosovo (in Albanian)
Legend: Blue = home team win; Yellow = draw; Red = away team win.
For upcoming matches, an "a" indicates there is an article about the rivalry between the two participants.

=== Matches 23–33 ===
Home \ Away	BAL	DRE	DRI	FZJ	FRN	FLA	GJI	KEK	LIR	LLA	PRI	T89
Ballkani	—	—	2–0	2–4	—	2–0	1–0	—	—	—	0–2	—
Drenica	1–1	—	—	0–0	0–1	—	0–0	—	—	0–2	—	2–0
Drita	—	2–2	—	—	—	1–2	—	4–0	2–0	—	1–1	1–1
Ferizaj	—	—	1–2	—	—	3–1	2–1	—	3–1	—	0–2	—
Feronikeli	1–0	—	4–1	1–2	—	—	2–0	—	—	—	1–0	5–0
Flamurtari	—	0–0	—	—	0–0	—	—	2–1	0–1	3–2	—	—
Gjilani	—	—	0–0	—	—	0–1	—	2–0	4–0	—	0–1	1–1
KEK-u	0–3	1–5	—	2–5	0–4	—	—	—	—	0–1	—	—
Liria	0–0	2–3	—	—	0–4	—	—	3–1	—	0–4	—	—
Llapi	1–1	—	1–0	2–0	1–3	—	2–1	—	—	—	—	4–1
Prishtina	—	2–1	—	—	—	3–0	—	1–0	3–0	1–0	—	3–0
Trepça'89	2–1	—	—	1–2	—	1–0	—	4–0	2–1	—	—	—

Source: Football Federation of Kosovo (in Albanian)
Legend: Blue = home team win; Yellow = draw; Red = away team win.
For upcoming matches, an "a" indicates there is an article about the rivalry between the two participants.

=== Relegation play-offs ===
The ninth and tenth-placed teams, Trepça'89 and Gjilani respectively, each paired off against the third and fourth-placed teams from the 2018–19 First Football League of Kosovo season, Vëllaznimi and Besa Pejë respectively; the two winners will play in the top-flight next season. As with previous seasons, both play-offs will be played on neutral ground.

1 June 2019
16:00 (CEST)

Trepça'89	4–2	Vëllaznimi
R. Asare 14'; A. Manaj 54'; H. Hyseni 65'; E. Hoti 86'	Report	T. Bardhoku 26'; A. Murati 42'

Fadil Vokrri Stadium

Trepça'89 retained their spot in 2019–20 Football Superleague of Kosovo; Vëllaznimi remained in 2019–20 First Football League of Kosovo.

30 May 2019
16:00 (CEST)

Gjilani	1–0	Besa Pejë
K. Rezak 24'	Report

Fadil Vokrri Stadium
Referee: Tefik Maloku

Gjilani retained their spot in 2019–20 Football Superleague of Kosovo; Besa Pejë remained in 2019–20 First Football League of Kosovo.

== Season statistics ==
=== Scoring ===
==== Top scorers ====
As of matches played on 19 May 2019.

Rank	Player	Club	Goals
1	(Kosovo) Kastriot Rexha	Feronikeli	21
2	(Albania) Ahmed Januzi	Llapi	12
2	(Kosovo) Festim Alidema	Llapi	12
4	(Kosovo) Meriton Korenica	Prishtina	11
5	(Kosovo) Mendurim Hoti	Feronikeli	10
5	(Kosovo) Alban Shillova	Flamurtari	10
5	(Kosovo) Jetmir Topalli	Ballkani	10
8	(Kosovo) Betim Haxhimusa	Drita	9
8	(Brazil) Jean Carioca	Feronikeli	9
10	(Kosovo) Kreshnik Uka	Drenica	8
10	(Kosovo) Liridon Fetahaj	Liria	8
10	(Albania) Mario Morina	Prishtina	8

== Notes and references ==
=== Notes ===
1. This season was the 20th season under the name Football Superleague of Kosovo, the 26th season of top-tier football in Kosovo and the 72nd season of football in Kosovo overall.
2. The two teams, Drita and Gjilan, which use this stadium together with their fans, have named the stadium with different names. Drita and their fans call the stadium as Selami Osmani-Bezi Stadium, while Gjilan and their fans call the stadium as Agim Ramadani Stadium, but officially the stadium is called Gjilan City Stadium.
