= 2019–20 Football Superleague of Kosovo =

Football Superleague of Kosovo
- Season: 2019–20
- Dates: 17 August 2019 – 26 July 2020
- Champions: Drita
- Relegated: Flamurtari; Vushtrria; Dukagjini; Ferizaj
- Champions League: Drita
- Europa League: Gjilani; Prishtina
- Matches: 192
- Goals: 548 (2.85 per match)
- Top goalscorer: Blendi Baftiu (19 goals)
- Biggest home win: Prishtina 8–1 Ferizaj (7 June 2020)
- Biggest away win: Flamurtari 1–5 Llapi (23 September 2019)
- Highest scoring: Prishtina 8–1 Ferizaj (7 June 2020) Trepca 89 5–4 Llapi (18 July 2020)
- Longest winning run: Drita (8 matches)
- Longest unbeaten run: Gjilani; Ballkani (10 matches)
- Longest winless run: Dukagjini (19 matches)
- Longest losing run: Dukagjini (8 matches)
- Highest attendance: 9,000; Prishtina 0–0 Ballkani (29 February 2020)
- All statistics correct as of 23 July 2020.

The 2019–20 Football Superleague of Kosovo season, also known as the IPKO Superleague of Kosovo (Albanian: IPKO Superliga e Kosovës) for sponsorship reasons with IPKO was the 21st season of top-tier football in Kosovo. The season began on 17 August 2019 and will end on 26 July 2020. A total of 12 teams are competing in the league: ten teams from the 2018–19 season and two teams from the 2018–19 First Football League of Kosovo. Feronikeli are the defending champions from the previous season.

After UEFA permission Kosovo will be represented with 3 teams in European competitions, Superleague winner will take part in Champions League while domestic league runners-up and domestic cup winner will take part in Europa League.

The Football Federation of Kosovo has also announced that the current season will be the last season with 12 teams. 4 teams will be relegated to First Football League of Kosovo and 2 teams from First Football League of Kosovo will be promoted to Superleague of Kosovo to complete the 10 teams for the 2020–21 season.

== Teams and stadiums ==
Locations of the 2019–20 Football Superleague of Kosovo teams

Liria and KEK were relegated after finishing the previous season in eleventh and twelfth-place respectively. They will be replaced by the champions and runners-up of the 2018–19 First League, Vushtrria and Dukagjini respectively.

Note: Table lists in alphabetical order.

Club	Town	Stadium and capacity		UEFA license
Ballkani	Suva Reka	Suva Reka City Stadium	1,500	Yes
Drenica	Skenderaj	Bajram Aliu Stadium	3,000	Yes
Drita	Gjilan	Gjilan City Stadium	15,000	Yes
Dukagjini	Klina	18 June Stadium	2,000	No
Ferizaj	Ferizaj	Ferizaj Synthetic Grass Stadium	1,500	No
Feronikeli	Drenas	Rexhep Rexhepi Stadium	2,000	Yes
Flamurtari	Pristina	Xhemail Ibishi Stadium	5,000	No
Gjilani	Gjilan	Gjilan City Stadium	15,000	Yes
Llapi	Podujevo	Zahir Pajaziti Stadium	10,000	Yes
Prishtina	Pristina	Fadil Vokrri Stadium	13,000	Yes
Trepça'89	Mitrovica	Riza Lushta Stadium	12,000	Yes
Vushtrria	Vushtrri	Ferki Aliu Stadium	6,000	No

== League table ==
Pos	Team	Pld	W	D	L	GF	GA	GD	Pts	Qualification or relegation
1	Drita (C)	33	21	5	7	57	23	+34	68	Qualification for the Champions League preliminary round
2	Gjilani	33	21	5	7	61	27	+34	68	Qualification for the Europa League preliminary round
3	Ballkani	33	19	10	4	59	25	+34	67	
4	Prishtina	33	18	8	7	59	25	+34	62	Qualification for the Europa League preliminary round (Note: Prishtina qualified for the Europa League preliminary round by winning the 2019–20 Kosovar Cup.)
5	Feronikeli	33	14	5	14	50	40	+10	47	
6	Llapi	33	13	6	14	51	62	−11	45	
7	Trepça '89	33	12	8	13	55	55	0	44	
8	Drenica	33	12	8	13	39	40	−1	44	
9	Flamurtari (R)	33	12	7	14	42	56	−14	43	Relegation to the First Football League of Kosovo
10	Ferizaj (R)	33	9	2	22	34	70	−36	29	Relegation to the First Football League of Kosovo
11	Vushtrria (R)	33	5	6	22	34	76	−42	21	Relegation to the First Football League of Kosovo
12	Dukagjini (R)	33	5	4	24	27	69	−42	19	Relegation to the First Football League of Kosovo

Source: Football Federation of Kosovo (in Albanian)
Rules for classification: 1) Points; 2) Head-to-head points; 3) Head-to-head goal difference; 4) Goal difference; 5) Goals scored; 6) Play-offs (only if needed to decide champions, teams for relegation or teams for UEFA competitions).
(C) Champions; (R) Relegated

== Results ==
Each team plays three times against every opponent (either twice at home and once away or once at home and twice away) for a total of 33 games played each.

=== Matches 1–22 ===
Home \ Away	BAL	DRE	DRI	DUK	FZJ	FRN	FLA	GJI	LLA	PRI	T89	VUS
Ballkani	—	3–0	2–0	3–0	3–0	3–1	3–1	2–1	1–1	1–0	3–2	5–2
Drenica	0–1	—	1–1	3–0	0–2	1–0	3–1	0–2	3–0	1–3	3–2	3–0
Drita	2–0	4–1	—	1–0	0–1	1–0	3–0	2–0	2–0	2–1	1–1	5–1
Dukagjini	0–0	1–3	0–4	—	0–1	0–2	1–2	0–4	0–0	0–0	1–0	1–0
Ferizaj	1–2	0–1	0–2	2–0	—	1–1	1–0	0–3	2–0	0–2	4–0	0–1
Feronikeli	0–2	4–1	0–0	4–2	5–0	—	2–1	1–2	1–2	1–0	3–0	2–0
Flamurtari	2–1	0–0	1–0	2–0	1–0	2–2	—	1–4	1–5	1–1	4–3	2–0
Gjilani	1–0	1–1	0–1	1–0	4–0	2–1	2–0	—	3–0	0–0	0–2	2–0
Llapi	0–0	1–0	2–2	2–1	2–4	2–1	1–4	2–1	—	1–4	4–1	4–1
Prishtina	0–0	0–0	1–0	2–0	3–2	2–3	2–0	2–1	0–1	—	1–0	4–0
Trepça'89	0–0	1–1	3–1	2–1	1–0	1–1	5–1	4–1	1–2	0–1	—	1–0
Vushtrria	1–0	2–2	2–3	3–3	3–1	0–1	2–2	1–3	1–0	0–3	1–1	—

Source: Football Federation of Kosovo (in Albanian)
Legend: Blue = home team win; Yellow = draw; Red = away team win.
For upcoming matches, an "a" indicates there is an article about the rivalry between the two participants.

=== Matches 23–33 ===
Home \ Away	BAL	DRE	DRI	DUK	FZJ	FRN	FLA	GJI	LLA	PRI	T89	VUS
Ballkani	—	0–0	2–1	—	—	—	—	—	5–1	2–2	3–1	3–1
Drenica	—	—	—	1–0	3–0	—	1–2	—	—	—	2–4	2–1
Drita	—	1–0	—	2–0	2–0	2–1	1–0	0–2	—	—	—	—
Dukagjini	1–5	—	—	—	—	0–2	—	1–3	—	—	3–2	2–1
Ferizaj	1–1	—	—	0–4	—	2–4	—	0–3	—	—	2–5	—
Feronikeli	0–1	0–0	—	—	—	—	—	0–2	2–1	—	1–2	3–1
Flamurtari	0–0	—	—	4–3	3–2	1–0	—	0–1	—	—	—	—
Gjilani	2–2	2–0	—	—	—	—	—	—	2–2	2–1	1–1	3–0
Llapi	—	0–2	0–4	4–1	2–1	—	1–0	—	—	1–1	—	—
Prishtina	—	1–0	1–1	4–1	8–1	3–1	3–0	—	—	—	—	—
Trepça'89	—	—	0–2	—		—	1–1	—	5–4	2–1	—	1–1
Vushtrria	—	—	0–4	—	1–0	—	2–2	—	5–3	0–2	—	—

Updated to match(es) played on 26 July 2020. Source: Football Federation of Kosovo (in Albanian)
Legend: Blue = home team win; Yellow = draw; Red = away team win.
For upcoming matches, an "a" indicates there is an article about the rivalry between the two participants.

== Season statistics ==
=== Top scorers ===
As of matches played on 23 July 2020.

Rank	Player	Club	Goals
1	(Kosovo) Blendi Baftiu	Ballkani	19
2	(Kosovo) Arb Manaj	Trepça'89	17
3	(Albania) Ahmed Januzi	Prishtina	14
4	(Kosovo) Kastriot Rexha	Drita	13
5	(Albania) Gerhard Progni	Gjilani	12
6	(Kosovo) Fiton Hajdari	Gjilani	11
6	(Kosovo) Alban Shillova	Drenica	11
8	(Kosovo) Betim Haxhimusa	Drita	10
8	(Kosovo) Shend Kelmendi	Flamurtari	10
8	(Nigeria) Otto John	Prishtina	10
8	(Kosovo) Bashkim Shala	Feronikeli	10

== Notes ==
1. This season was the 21st season under the name Football Superleague of Kosovo, the 27th season of top-tier football in Kosovo and the 73rd season of football in Kosovo overall.
2. The two teams, Drita and Gjilan, which use this stadium together with their fans, have named the stadium with different names. Drita and their fans call the stadium as Selami Osmani-Bezi Stadium, while Gjilan and their fans call the stadium as Agim Ramadani Stadium, but officially the stadium is called Gjilan City Stadium.
