= Prince Balde =

Liberian footballer

Personal information
- Date of birth: 23 March 1998 (age 28)
- Place of birth: Monrovia, Liberia
- Height: 1.87 m (6 ft 2 in)
- Position: Center-back

Team information
- Current team: Trelleborgs FF
- Number: 12

Senior career*
| Years | Team | Apps | (Gls) |
| 2015–2016 | Champasak United | | |
| 2016–2018 | Monrovia Club Breweries | | |
| 2018–2021 | Feronikeli | 28 | (0) |
| 2019 | → Drenica (loan) | 22 | (1) |
| 2021–2023 | Drita | 33 | (2) |
| 2023 | Al-Diwaniya | | |
| 2024–2026 | FC Rosengård | 47 | (1) |
| 2026– | Trelleborgs FF | 11 | (1) |

International career^{‡}
| 2017– | Liberia | 26 | (1) |
- * Club domestic league appearances and goals as of 16 November 2026 ‡ National team caps and goals as of 31 March 2026

Prince Balde (born 23 March 1998) is a Liberian professional footballer who plays as a center-back for Swedish club Trelleborgs FF and the Liberia national team.

== Club career ==
=== Drita ===
On 1 July 2021, Balde signed a two-year contract with Kosovan club Drita and received squad number 26. On 21 August, he made his debut in a 2–1 home win against his former club Feronikeli.

== International career ==
In July 2017, Balde made his debut for Liberia in a friendly match against Mauritania.

== Career statistics ==
=== Club ===
As of match played 8 March 2026

Appearances and goals by club, season and competition
| Club | Season | League | | | National cup | | Europe | | Other | | Total | |
| Club | Season | Division | Apps | Goals | Apps | Goals | Apps | Goals | Apps | Goals | Apps | Goals |
|---|---|---|---|---|---|---|---|---|---|---|---|---|
| Feronikeli | 2018–19 | Football Superleague of Kosovo | 0 | 0 | 0 | 0 | — | | — | | 0 | 0 |
| Feronikeli | 2019–20 | Football Superleague of Kosovo | 6 | 0 | 1 | 0 | — | | — | | 7 | 0 |
| Feronikeli | 2020–21 | Football Superleague of Kosovo | 22 | 0 | 3 | 0 | — | | — | | 25 | 0 |
| Feronikeli | Total | | 28 | 0 | 4 | 0 | — | | — | | 32 | 0 |
| Drenica (loan) | 2018–19 | Football Superleague of Kosovo | 7 | 0 | — | | — | | — | | 7 | 0 |
| Drenica (loan) | 2019–20 | Football Superleague of Kosovo | 15 | 1 | — | | — | | — | | 15 | 1 |
| Drenica (loan) | Total | | 22 | 1 | — | | — | | — | | 22 | 1 |
| FC Drita | 2021–22 | Football Superleague of Kosovo | 29 | 1 | 6 | 0 | — | | — | | 35 | 1 |
| FC Drita | 2022–23 | Football Superleague of Kosovo | 4 | 1 | 0 | 0 | 4 (Note: Appearances in UEFA Conference League) | 0 | — | | 8 | 1 |
| FC Drita | Total | | 33 | 2 | 6 | 0 | 4 | 0 | — | | 43 | 2 |
| FC Rosengård | 2024 | Ettan Fotboll | 23 | 1 | — | | — | | — | | 23 | 1 |
| FC Rosengård | 2025 | Ettan Fotboll | 24 | 0 | — | | — | | — | | 24 | 0 |
| FC Rosengård | Total | | 47 | 1 | — | | — | | — | | 47 | 1 |
| Trelleborgs FF | 2026 | Ettan Fotboll | 3 | 0 | — | | — | | — | | 3 | 0 |
| Career total | | | 133 | 4 | 10 | 0 | 4 | 0 | 0 | 0 | 147 | 4 |

=== International ===
As of match played 31 March 2026

Appearances and goals by national team and year
| National team | Year | Apps | Goals |
|---|---|---|---|
| Liberia | 2017 | 2 | 0 |
| Liberia | 2021 | 7 | 0 |
| Liberia | 2022 | 3 | 0 |
| Liberia | 2023 | 2 | 0 |
| Liberia | 2024 | 3 | 0 |
| Liberia | 2025 | 7 | 0 |
| Liberia | 2026 | 2 | 1 |
| Total | | 26 | 1 |

Scores and results list Liberia's goal tally first, score column indicates score after each Balde goal.

List of international goals scored by Prince Balde
| No. | Date | Venue | Opponent | Score | Result | Competition |
|---|---|---|---|---|---|---|
| 1 | 31 March 2026 | Stade Larbi Zaouli, Casablanca, Morocco | Libya | 2–2 | 2–2 | Friendly |
