= Ardian Nuhiu =

Macedonian footballer

Ardijan Nuhiji
Personal information
- Full name: Ardijan Nuhiji; Ардијан Нухии
- Date of birth: 7 December 1978 (age 47)
- Place of birth: Skopje, SR Macedonia, SFR Yugoslavia (modern North Macedonia)
- Height: 1.72 m (5 ft 8 in)
- Position: Midfielder

Team information
- Current team: Drita (manager)

Senior career*
Years	Team	Apps	(Gls)
2000–2001	Vardar	1	(0)
2001–2004	Sloga Jugomagnat	47	(9)
2004–2006	Rabotnichki	39	(6)
2006–2007	Dinamo Tirana	15	(3)
2007–2008	Elbasani	29	(3)
2008	Rabotnichki	4	(1)
2009	Metalurg	8	(2)
2009	Steel Azin	15	(1)
2009–2010	Hapoel Acre	5	(2)
2010	Vardar	9	(4)
2010–2011	Shkendija	29	(7)
2011–2012	11 Oktomvri	7	(0)
2012–2013	Drita Bogovinë	30	(9)
2013	Shkëndija	14	(4)
2014–2016	Shkupi	22	(4)

International career^{‡}
2005	Macedonia B	2	(1)
2003–2005	Macedonia	3	(0)

Managerial career
- 2016–2018: Shkupi
- 2019–2022: Drita
- 2023: Shkëndija
- 2024–2025: Gjilani
- 2025–2026: Tirana
- 2026–: Drita
- * Club domestic league appearances and goals as of 7 June 2016 ‡ National team caps and goals as of 7 June 2016

Ardian Nuhiu (Macedonian: Ардијан Нухии; Ardijan Nuhiji, born 7 December 1978 in Skopje) is a retired association footballer and manager born in the Socialist Republic of Macedonia, within the Socialist Federal Republic of Yugoslavia. An ethnic Albanian, he represented Macedonia at the international level. He is the current manager of Drita.

== Playing career ==
Nuhiji played as an attacking midfielder or striker.

=== Club ===
He had previously played in Republic of Macedonia and in Albania.

=== International ===
He made his senior debut for Macedonia in an October 2003 friendly match against Ukraine and has earned a total of 5 caps (2 unofficial), scoring 1 goal. His final international was a November 2005 friendly against Paraguay.

== Managerial career ==
After a retirement, Nuhiji was from 2016 to 2018 a manager of the club where he finished his playing career, FK Shkupi.

He was appointed manager of kosovar club FC Drita in February 2019 and won win them the 2019-20 Football Superleague of Kosovo.

After managing KF Shkëndija in his home country for a few months in 2023, he returned to Kosovo in June 2024 and signed for Drita's local rivals SC Gjilani. He left the club on 29 September 2025 in a mutual agreement after a 4–1 loss against KF Llapi.

On 31 October 2025, only one month after leaving SC Gjilani, Nuhiu signed as the new manager of KF Tirana in the Albanian Kategoria Superiore. He left the club on 23 February 2026 with Tirana placed in the relegation zone.

On 10 August 2026, Nuhiu returned to Drita replacing Zekirija Ramadani. His first month was very difficult, as Drita was knocked out of the 2026-27 UEFA Conference League in the Play-Off round after losing against Inter Club d'Escaldes in the penalty shoot-out.

== Managerial statistics ==
As of 22 November 2026

Coaching record by team and tenure
Team	Nat	From	To	Record							
Team	Nat	From	To	P	W	D	L	GF	GA	GD	Win %
Shkupi	(North Macedonia)	29 November 2016	13 March 2018	43	12	14	17	44	54	−10	27.91
Drita	(Kosovo)	11 February 2019	24 November 2022	161	88	37	36	263	141	+122	54.66
Shkëndija	(North Macedonia)	5 June 2023	14 December 2023	20	11	5	4	29	19	+10	55.00
Gjilani	(Kosovo)	3 June 2024	29 September 2025	45	16	13	16	60	62	−2	35.56
Tirana	(Albania)	31 October 2025	23 February 2026	18	4	6	8	13	25	−12	22.22
Drita	(Kosovo)	10 August 2026	Present	17	9	5	3	30	16	+14	52.94
Total				304	140	80	84	439	317	+122	46.05

== Honours ==
=== Manager ===
Drita

- Kosovar League: 2019–20
