= Ilir Blakçori =

Kosovar professional footballer (born 1993)

Personal information
- Full name: Ilir Blakçori
- Date of birth: 1 February 1993 (age 33)
- Place of birth: Podujevë, FR Yugoslavia (now Kosovo)
- Height: 1.73 m (5 ft 8 in)
- Position: Left-back

Team information
- Current team: Llapi
- Number: 18

Senior career*
Years	Team	Apps	(Gls)
2015-2016	Llapi	34	(5)
2016-2017	Gjilani	7	(0)
2017–2019	Llapi	55	(2)
2019-2023	Drita	132	(3)
2023–	Llapi	93	(8)
- * Club domestic league appearances and goals as of 1 June 2026

Ilir Blakçori (born 1 February 1993) is a Kosovar professional footballer who plays as a left-back for Football Superleague of Kosovo club Llapi.

== Club career ==
=== Llapi ===
Born in Podujevo, in modern-day Kosovo, with a family originally from the village of Podujevo. Blakçori played with Llapi in the Football Superleague of Kosovo

=== Gjilani ===
Blakçori was transferred to Gjilani in the summer of 2016. He debuted in the Super League of Kosovo, his opponent was Drita, which is considered one of the biggest derbies in Kosovo, where Gjilani won with a score of 0:1.

=== Return Llapi ===
On 1 July 2017, Blakçori signed a two-year contract with Kosovo Superliga club Llapi twelve days later, he made his debut with Llapi in the 2017 Kosovo Supercup against Vllaznia Pozheran.

=== Drita ===
On 01 July 2019, Blakçori signed a three-half-year contract with Football Superleague of Kosovo club Drita and received squad number 18. One month later, he made his debut in a 0–1 home defeat against Ferizaj after being named in the starting line-up.

In 2020, Blakçori won the title of champion in the Football Superleague of Kosovo

=== Llapi ===
He moved to Llapi in July 2023 and made his debut in the first match against his former team Drita where they lost 2-0
