= Bylbyl Sokoli =

Kosovar football manager (born 1957)

Personal details
- Born: 19 December 1958 (age 67) Rahovec, FPR Yugoslavia
- Party: Vetëvendosje
- Education: University of Pristina
Association football career
- Position: Defender
Senior career*
Years	Team	Apps	(Gls)
- Rahoveci
–1982	Ramiz Sadiku		
Managerial career
- 2000–2001: Drita
- 2002–2005: Kosovo
- 2005–2006: Bashkimi
- 2007: Milano Kumanovë
- 2007–2008: Renova
- 2008–2009: Milano Kumanovë
- 2009–2010: KEK-u
- 2010: Hysi
- 2010–2011: Renova
- 2013–2014: Ferizaj
- 2014–2015: Prishtina
- 2015–2016: Gjilani
- 2017: Vllaznia Pozheran
- 2018: Ferizaj
- 2018: Llapi
- 2019: Ferizaj
- 2019: Prishtina
- 2020–2021: Gjilani
- 2023: Malisheva
- 2024: Dinamo Ferizaj
- 2024: Drenica
- 2025: Drenica
- 2026: Malisheva
- * Club domestic league appearances and goals

Bylbyl Sokoli (born 19 December 1957) is a football manager, former player and university professor. His most recent job in football was as manager of KF Malisheva.

== Managerial career ==
Sokoli began his managerial career in the late 1990s with Ramiz Sadiku and later Flamurtari and 2 Korriku. He has managed various clubs in Kosovo such as KF Prishtina, KF Liria, KF Ferizaj, and KF Drenica. Additionally, he has managed the Kosovo national team on two occasions.

== Achievements ==
As a manager, Sokoli has won:

- Kosovo Superleague in 2001 and 2002 with KF Prishtina
- Kosovo Cup in 2000 with KF Prishtina and in 2006 with KF Liria

== Coaching style ==
Sokoli is known for his attacking style of football and expects high levels of effort and commitment from his players.

== Academic contributions ==
Sokoli graduated from the Faculty of Physical Education in Pristina in 1985 and completed his postgraduate studies, earning a doctorate in 2003. He obtained a UEFA coaching certificate in 2004 and a UEFA Pro Licence in 2006. Sokoli is also a lecturer of football at the Faculty of Sports Sciences at the University of Pristina.

== Honours and recognition ==
Sokoli has been named Coach of the Year three times. His career as both a player and a coach, along with his academic contributions, have had a notable impact on football in Kosovo.

== See also ==
- Sport in Kosovo
