= Faton Maloku =

Kosovan footballer

Personal information
- Full name: Faton Maloku
- Date of birth: 11 June 1991 (age 35)
- Place of birth: Gjilan, SFR Yugoslavia
- Height: 1.89 m (6 ft 2 in)
- Position: Goalkeeper

Team information
- Current team: Drita
- Number: 1

Senior career*
| Years | Team | Apps | (Gls) |
| 2010–2012 | Gjilani | | |
| 2012–2013 | Feronikeli | | |
| 2013 | Hajvalia | | |
| 2013–2016 | Gjilani | 35 | (0) |
| 2016–2018 | Feronikeli | 44 | (0) |
| 2018–2019 | Kukësi | 6 | (0) |
| 2019– | Drita | 179 | (0) |
- * Club domestic league appearances and goals as of 22 June 2026

Faton Maloku (born 11 June 1991) is a Kosovan professional footballer who plays as a goalkeeper for Kosovo club Drita.

== Club career ==
=== Return to Feronikeli ===
On 30 December 2016, Maloku returned to his former club, Feronikeli and signed a 1,5 year contract.

=== Kukësi ===
On 5 June 2018, Maloku signed to Albanian Superliga side Kukësi and became the fifth goalkeeper at the club. On 16 August, he made his debut with Kukësi in the third qualifying round of 2018–19 UEFA Europa League against Georgian side Torpedo Kutaisi.

== International career ==
On 8 November 2017, Maloku received a call-up from Kosovo for the friendly match against Latvia, he was an unused substitute in that match.
