= Blendi Baftiu =

Kosovan footballer

Personal information
- Full name: Blendi Xhemajl Baftiu
- Date of birth: 17 February 1998 (age 28)
- Place of birth: Pristina, FR Yugoslavia (now Kosovo)
- Height: 1.81 m (5 ft 11 in)
- Position: Attacking midfielder

Team information
- Current team: Prishtina
- Number: 10

Youth career
- –2015: Ramiz Sadiku
- 2015–2016: Skënderbeu Korçë
- 2016–2018: Prishtina

Senior career*
Years	Team	Apps	(Gls)
2015	Ramiz Sadiku		
2015–2016	Skënderbeu Korçë	0	(0)
2016–2018	Prishtina	23	(1)
2017–2018	→ Flamurtari (loan)	14	(1)
2018–2022	Ballkani	69	(28)
2022–2024	Drita	72	(13)
2024–2025	Llapi	32	(4)
2025–	Prishtina	29	(5)

International career^{‡}
2019	Kosovo U21	4	(1)
2020	Kosovo	1	(0)
- * Club domestic league appearances and goals as of 22 June 2026 ‡ National team caps and goals as of 17 January 2020

Blendi Xhemajl Baftiu (born 17 February 1998) is a Kosovan professional footballer who plays as an attacking midfielder for Kosovan club FC Prishtina. He has been capped for the Kosovo national team.

== Club career ==
=== Early career ===
Baftiu began his football career with the youth team of Ramiz Sadiku until 25 September 2015, where he signed a long-term contract with Albanian Superliga club Skënderbeu Korçë, but he during the 2015–16 season would play with under-19 team.

=== Prishtina ===
On 1 June 2016, Baftiu joined Football Superleague of Kosovo side Prishtina, on a three-year contract.

=== Loan at Flamurtari ===
On 10 August 2017, Baftiu joined Football Superleague of Kosovo side Flamurtari, on a season-long loan.

=== Ballkani ===
On 14 June 2018, Baftiu joined Football Superleague of Kosovo side Ballkani, on a two-year contract. On 19 August 2018, he made his debut in a 0–1 away win against Liria after being named in the starting line-up. He was the 2019-20 Football Superleague of Kosovo top scorer as Ballkani finished third, only one point short of its first league title.

=== Return to Pristina ===
After playing for FC Drita from 2022 to 2024 and for FC Llapi in the 24-25 season, he returned to his hometown club FC Prishtina on 14 June 2025.

== International career ==
On 21 March 2017, Baftiu received a call-up from Kosovo U21 for a 2019 UEFA European Under-21 Championship qualification match against Republic of Ireland U21. On 6 June 2019, he made his debut with Kosovo U21 in a match against Andorra U21 after coming on as a substitute at 86th minute in place of Arbnor Muja.

On 24 December 2019, Baftiu received a call-up from Kosovo for the friendly match against Sweden and made his debut after coming on as a substitute at 46th minute in place of Ylldren Ibrahimaj.
