= Hamdi Namani =

Kosovar professional footballer (born 1994)

Personal information
- Full name: Hamdi Namani
- Date of birth: 16 October 1994 (age 32)
- Place of birth: Podujevë, FR Yugoslavia (now Kosovo)
- Height: 1.89 m (6 ft 2 in)
- Position: Defensive midfielder

Team information
- Current team: Gjilani (on loan from Prishtina)
- Number: 34

Senior career*
Years	Team	Apps	(Gls)
2013–2019	Llapi	129	(22)
2019–2023	Drita	123	(12)
2023–2025	Llapi	64	(6)
2025–	Prishtina	17	(2)
2026–	→ Gjilani (loan)	6	(0)
- * Club domestic league appearances and goals as of 22 June 2026

Hamdi Namani (born 16 October 1994) is a Kosovar professional footballer who plays as a defensive midfielder for Football Superleague of Kosovo club Gjilani, on loan from Prishtina.

== Club career ==
=== Llapi ===
Born in Podujevo, in modern-day Kosovo, Namani played with Llapi in the Football Superleague of Kosovo

He started his career here and made his debut in the Kosovo Super League with Llapi jersey against the opponent Vushtrri, which they won with a score of 0:1 in the first leg.

=== Drita ===
On 1 July 2019, Namani signed a three-year contract with Kosovo Superliga club Drita one month later, he made his debut with Drita in the 2019 Football Superleague of Kosovo against Ferizaj. where they lost 0:1 at home

At the end of the championship, Namani was declared the champion of Kosovo with his team Drita

=== Return Llapi ===
On 1 July 2023 he moved to Llapi in July 2023 and made his debut in the first match against his former team Drita where they lost 2-0
