= Debatik Curri =

Kosovar footballer (born 1983)

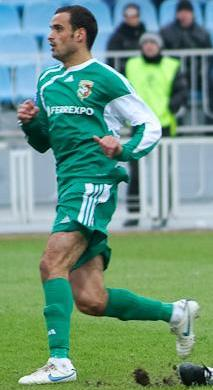
- Curri with Vorskla Poltava in 2010

Personal information
- Full name: Debatik Nazmi Curri
- Date of birth: 28 December 1983 (age 42)
- Place of birth: Pristina, SFR Yugoslavia (now Kosovo)
- Height: 1.89 m (6 ft 2 in)
- Position: Defender

Youth career
- –2001: Prishtina

Senior career*
Years	Team	Apps	(Gls)
2001–2005	Prishtina	75	(8)
2005–2010	Vorskla Poltava	148	(19)
2010–2013	Gençlerbirliği	33	(0)
2013	Hoverla Uzhhorod	5	(0)
2014	Sevastopol	7	(0)
2014–2015	Tirana	27	(2)
2015–2016	Flamurtari	8	(0)
2016–2018	Prishtina	58	(3)
Total		286	(24)

International career
2006–2015	Albania	44	(1)
2014	Kosovo	1	(0)

Managerial career
- 2018–2023: Prishtina (assistant)
- 2022: Prishtina (caretaker)
- 2023: Prishtina
- 2024: Suhareka (assistant)
- 2025–2026: Gjilani
- * Club domestic league appearances and goals

Debatik Nazmi Curri (born 28 December 1983) is a Kosovar professional football coach and former player.

From 2006 to 2015 he was also part of Albania national team, collecting 44 appearances and scoring once. He began his career as a defensive midfielder, but his position was changed to a centre-back when he joined the Albania national team in 2006.

== Club career ==
=== Early career ===
Curri began his professional career with Prishtina soon after the Kosovo War.

=== Vorskla Poltava ===
On 1 July 2005, Curri signed with Ukrainian side Vorskla Poltava. He played for many years on the team, together with fellow Albanians, Armend Dallku & Ahmed Januzi.

=== Genclerbirliği ===
On 16 May 2010, Curri signed a three-year contract with Turkish Süper Lig side Gençlerbirliği.

=== Hoverla Uzhhorod ===
On 23 July 2013 he returned to Ukrainian Premier League by signing a two-years contract with FC Hoverla Uzhhorod.

=== Sevastopol ===
After he prematurely ended his contract with FC Hoverla Uzhhorod, where he had a deal until 2015, he returned to Ukrainian Premier League on 18 January 2014, signing with Sevastopol, joining Besart Ibraimi, an Albanian from North Macedonia. After some games as an unused substitute, he made his debut on 29 March 2014 against Karpaty Lviv, playing a full 90 minutes in a match which finished in a goalless draw. For the next fixture match, a week later on 4 April 2014, Curri played another full 90-minutes against his former team for 5 consecutive seasons Vorskla Poltava, which finished in a 1–0 victory. He became a regular starter in the team as he continued by playing the entire match against Tavriya Simferopol on 17 April 2014, a match that ended in the 0–2 victory.

=== Tirana ===
At the beginning of the summer transfers window for 2014, numerous Albanian clubs, such as Flamurtari Vlorë and Tirana showed interest in signing Curri, who was a free agent. Initially, Tirana withdrew due to the financial requests of Curri. However, on 27 July, Tirana agreed terms with Curri to sign with them.

He made it his debut on 24 August 2014, playing the full 90-minutes against Apolonia Fier, in the opening day of 2014–15 season, winning the match 3–0. He scored his first goal on 14 September 2014, to give his team the 2–1 victory by scoring at the end of stoppage time, in the 90+3' minute against Elbasani. On 18 October 2014 Curri scored his second goal for Tirana, scoring against Kukësi, after he noticed the wrong placement of goalkeeper Argjent Halili, and taking a shot from the midfield.

=== Flamurtari Vlorë ===
He remained in Albania after his contract with Tirana had expired, as he signed a one-year contract with Flamurtari Vlorë with the option of a further year. On 10 August, during the training session in Slovenia, Curri suffered a bone-breaking in the calf below the knee on the right leg after a collision with Bruno Telushi, thus keeping him sidelined for the next three months.

=== Prishtina ===
On 14 June 2016, Curri returned to Kosovo to join his first club Prishtina, signing a one-year contract, taking the vacant squad number 6. He was presented on the same day along with players such as Ahmed Januzi and Armend Dallku, his former international teammates. Curri made his official debut with the club on 13 August in the Kosovan Supercup, where Prishtina beat 1–0 Feronikeli to win the first silverware of the season. He made his league debut on 19 August in the opening league match against Llapi, playing full-90 minutes in a 3–1 home success. He scored his first goal of the season on 24 September against Feronikeli, the lone goal of the match which allowed Prishtina to take the first spot in the league. Five days later he scored another matchwinner, this time against Ferizaj to give Prishtina another three points to extend the league lead. He played 28 matches and scored twice as Prishtina finished runner-up in the championship.

== International career ==
=== Albania ===
Curri received the Albanian citizenship on 28 February 2006. Curri made it his international debut with Albania national team on 22 March 2006 by playing in starting line up under the coach Otto Barić in a goalless draw against Georgia, where he completed the first half and was substituted by Klodian Duro at the half-time. Curri scored his first goal for his national team on 11 October 2006 against Netherlands in the UEFA Euro 2008 qualification finished in the 2–1 loss in where Curri scored in the 64th minute the match closing goal.

In the 2010 FIFA World Cup qualification, under a new coach Arie Haan, Curri was ever-presented, playing every minute of all 10 matches of the Group 1. He formed the duo-centerbacks partnership with Lorik Cana mostly and a few times with his teammate at Vorskla Poltava, Armend Dallku and once with Elvin Beqiri. Albania was ranked in the 5th place behind of Denmark, Portugal, Sweden, Hungary and only above Malta, by where collected 1 win, 4 draws and 6 goals for, 13 goal against.

In the UEFA Euro 2012 qualifying Curri played just four out of ten matches, all as a starter, in which he was substituted off just once. He mostly wasn't available for selection by the coach Josip Kuže due to injuries. For the 2014 FIFA World Cup qualification Curri was called up to participate in five of the eight matches, in which he had game time just twice, as this time the new Albania coach Gianni De Biasi had created a strongly duo-partnership in defense with Captain of the national team Lorik Cana and Mërgim Mavraj.

Curri was an unused substitute in the opening match of the UEFA Euro 2016 qualifying against Portugal on 7 September 2014. He played as a substitute in the 2nd Group I match against Denmark on 11 October 2014. Curri officially announced his retirement from Albania against Kosovo.

=== Kosovo ===
On 21 May 2014, Curri played for his original country's birthplace, Kosovo, a full 90-minutes match against Turkey finished in the 1–6 home loss at the Adem Jashari Olympic Stadium, Mitrovica, Kosovo.

== Style of play ==
Curri is considered a defensive all-rounder, as he can be deployed in any defensive position. Curri's main playing position is as a centre back, but he can also be deployed as right or left-sided full-back and also as a defensive midfielder. He played in that position in his early days with Albania national team before converting into a centre back, forming a partnership with Lorik Cana.

== Career statistics ==
=== Club ===
As of 4 November 2017

Appearances and goals by club, season and competition
Club	Season	League			Cup		Europe		Total	
Club	Season	Division	Apps	Goals	Apps	Goals	Apps	Goals	Apps	Goals
Prishtina	2001–02	Football Superleague of Kosovo	14	0	0	0	—		14	0
Prishtina	2002–03	Football Superleague of Kosovo	23	0	0	0	—		23	0
Prishtina	2003–04	Football Superleague of Kosovo	25	3	0	0	—		25	3
Prishtina	2004–05	Football Superleague of Kosovo	13	5	0	0	—		13	5
Prishtina	Total		75	8	0	0	0	0	75	8
Vorskla Poltava	2004–05	Ukrainian Premier League	14	1	0	0	—		14	1
Vorskla Poltava	2005–06	Ukrainian Premier League	28	4	0	0	—		28	4
Vorskla Poltava	2006–07	Ukrainian Premier League	24	1	0	0	—		24	1
Vorskla Poltava	2007–08	Ukrainian Premier League	28	6	2	1	—		30	7
Vorskla Poltava	2008–09	Ukrainian Premier League	28	4	3	0	—		31	4
Vorskla Poltava	2009–10	Ukrainian Premier League	26	3	2 (Note: One appearance in Ukrainian Super Cup)	1	2 (Note: Appearance(s) in UEFA Europa League)	0	30	4
Vorskla Poltava	Total		148	19	7	2	2	0	157	21
Gençlerbirliği	2010–11	Süper Lig	6	0	0	0	—		6	0
Gençlerbirliği	2011–12	Süper Lig	14	0	1	1	—		15	1
Gençlerbirliği	2012–13	Süper Lig	13	0	1	0	—		14	0
Gençlerbirliği	Total		33	0	2	1	0	0	35	1
Hoverla Uzhhorod	2013–14	Ukrainian Premier League	5	0	0	0	—		5	0
Sevastopol	2013–14	Ukrainian Premier League	7	0	0	0	—		7	0
Tirana	2014–15	Albanian Superliga	27	2	4	0	—		31	2
Flamurtari Vlorë	2015–16	Albanian Superliga	8	0	1	0	—		9	0
Prishtina	2016–17	Football Superleague of Kosovo	28	2	2 (Note: One appearance in Kosovar Supercup)	0	—		30	2
Prishtina	2017–18	Football Superleague of Kosovo	13	1	0	0	2	0	15	1
Prishtina	Total		41	3	2	0	2	0	45	3
Career total			344	32	16	3	4	0	363	35

=== International ===
Appearances and goals by national team and year
National team	Year	Apps	Goals
Albania	2006	4	1
Albania	2007	9	0
Albania	2008	7	0
Albania	2009	9	0
Albania	2010	5	0
Albania	2011	3	0
Albania	2012	2	0
Albania	2013	2	0
Albania	2014	3	0
Total		44	1
Kosovo	2014	1	0
Total		2	0

Scores and results list Albania's goal tally first, score column indicates score after each Curri goal.

List of international goals scored by Debatik Curri
No.	Date	Venue	Cap	Opponent	Score	Result	Competition
1	11 October 2006	Amsterdam Arena, Amsterdam, Netherlands	4	Netherlands	1–2	1–2	UEFA Euro 2008 qualifying

== Honours ==
Vorskla Poltava

- Ukrainian Cup: 2008–09
- Ukrainian Super Cup Runner-up: 2009

Prishtina

- Kosovar Supercup: 2016

== Managerial statistics ==
As of 11 October 2026

Coaching record by team and tenure
Team	Nat	From	To	Record							
Team	Nat	From	To	P	W	D	L	GF	GA	GD	Win %
Prishtina	(Kosovo)	14 May 2022	9 June 2022	1	1	0	0	2	1	+1	100.00
Prishtina	(Kosovo)	13 March 2023	26 October 2023	23	9	10	4	36	20	+16	39.13
Gjilani	(Kosovo)	10 October 2025	11 October 2026	36	15	10	11	50	44	+6	41.67
Total				60	25	20	15	88	65	+23	41.67
