= Blerton Sheji =

Macedonian footballer (born 2000)

Personal information
- Full name: Blerton Sheji
- Date of birth: 21 October 2000 (age 26)
- Place of birth: Ohrid, Macedonia
- Height: 1.81 m (5 ft 11 in)
- Position: Left back

Team information
- Current team: Drita
- Number: 3

Youth career
- –2017: Shkëndija
- 2017–2019: Struga

Senior career*
| Years | Team | Apps | (Gls) |
| 2019–2021 | Struga | 45 | (0) |
| 2021–2024 | Shkupi | 83 | (0) |
| 2024– | Drita | 62 | (2) |

International career
| 2019 | Albania U21 | 1 | (0) |
| 2019 | Albania U20 | 1 | (0) |
| 2020–2021 | North Macedonia U21 | 11 | (0) |
- * Club domestic league appearances and goals as of 22 June 2026

Blerton Sheji (born 21 October 2000) is a Macedonian professional footballer who plays as a Left Back for Drita. Born in Ohrid, he represented Albania and later North Macedonia.

== Career ==
=== Shkupi (2021–2024) ===
On 24 May, 2021, Sheji joined Shkupi of the Macedonian First Football League.

== Honours ==
Shkupi

- Macedonian First Football League: 2021–22

Drita

- Kosovo Superleague: 2024–25
- Kosovar Supercup: 2025
