= Artan Latifi =

Kosovar footballer and coach

Personal information
- Full name: Artan Isa Latifi
- Date of birth: 5 April 1983 (age 43)
- Place of birth: Gjilan, SAP Kosovo, SFR Yugoslavia (modern Kosovo)
- Height: 1.88 m (6 ft 2 in)
- Position: Goalkeeper

Team information
- Current team: London Soccer School (goalkeeping coach)

Youth career
- 1996–1999: Drita

Senior career*
Years	Team	Apps	(Gls)
1999–2004	Drita	83	(0)
2004–2006	KEK	90	(0)
2006–2009	Hysi	103	(0)
2009–2010	Besiana	54	(0)
2010–2017	Drita	163	(0)
Total		493	(0)

Managerial career
- 2017–: London Soccer School (goalkeeping coach)
- * Club domestic league appearances and goals

Artan Isa Latifi (born 5 April 1983) is a Kosovar professional football coach and former player who is the current goalkeeping coach of London Soccer School.

== Club career ==
=== Drita and KEK ===
In 1996 Latifi began his career at Drita as a 13-year-old cadet and later joined the junior and senior team. In 2004, he was transferred to Kosovo Superleague side KEK.

=== Hysi and Besiana ===
In 2006 Latifi joined Football Superleague of Kosovo side Hysi, where he stayed for three years. In 2009, he joined First Football League of Kosovo side Besiana, on a one-year contract.

=== Return to Drita ===
In 2010 Latifi returned to Football Superleague of Kosovo side Drita, where he became the squad captain.

=== Retirement ===
On 10 March 2017 Latifi announced the retirement via a status on their official Facebook account, that he would retire at the end of 2016–17 season with the reason being to spend time with his family.
