= Zekirija Ramadani =

Macedonian association football manager and former player

Personal information
- Date of birth: 21 January 1978 (age 48)
- Place of birth: Skopje, SR Macedonia, SFR Yugoslavia (now North Macedonia)
- Height: 1.75 m (5 ft 9 in)
- Position: Defender

Team information
- Current team: Gjilani (manager)

Youth career
- 1995–1999: Shkëndija Haraçinë

Senior career*
Years	Team	Apps	(Gls)
1999–2004	Sloga Jugomagnat	104	(11)
2004–2005	Bashkimi	21	(2)
2005	Vëllazërimi 77	12	(0)
2005	Dinamo Tirana	1	(0)
2005-2007	Belasitsa Petrich	25	(1)
2006	→ Rabotnički (loan)	4	(1)
2007–2008	Besa Kavajë	23	(0)
2008–2009	Qarabağ	15	(0)
2009–2010	Shkëndija	0	(0)
2010	Vardar	2	(0)
2010–2011	Flamurtari	15	(0)
Total		222	(15)

International career
2001–2004	Macedonia	6	(0)

Managerial career
- 2014–2015: Shkupi
- 2016: Flamurtari
- 2017: Trepça'89
- 2017: Feronikeli
- 2018: Shkupi
- 2018–2019: Feronikeli
- 2020–2021: Prishtina
- 2021–2022: Egnatia
- 2022–2023: Gjilani
- 2023: Ohod
- 2023–2026: Drita
- 2026–: Gjilani
- * Club domestic league appearances and goals

Zekirija Ramadani (Macedonian: Зекирија Рамадани; born 21 January 1978) is a Macedonian professional football coach and former player of Albanian descent who is the manager of Kosovan club Gjilani. He has won the Kosovo Superleague as a manager five times with four different clubs.

== Club career ==
Ramadani began his professional career at Sloga Jugomagnat, where he played from 1999 to 2004. During his time with the Skopje-based club, he featured in European competitions, including the UEFA Champions League qualifying rounds in 2000 and 2001, as well as the UEFA Cup qualifying phase.

Following his stint at Sloga, Ramadani moved to Bashkimi for the 2004–05 season, followed by short spells at Vëllazërimi 77 and Albanian side Dinamo Tirana. In 2005, he transferred to the Bulgarian club Belasitsa Petrich, where he spent two seasons. During the summer of 2006, he returned to North Macedonia on loan to Rabotnički, making appearances in the UEFA Cup qualifiers.

In January 2007, Ramadani returned to Belasitsa Petrich before moving to the Albanian Superliga club Besa Kavajë later that year. He was a key part of the Besa squad that competed in the UEFA Intertoto Cup and the UEFA Cup qualifiers. In 2008, he signed with the Azerbaijani club Qarabağ, where he won the Azerbaijan Cup in the 2008–09 season. He concluded his playing career in 2011 after a season with Flamurtari in Vlorë.

== International career ==
Ramadani made his senior debut for the Macedonia national team on 26 July 2000 in a friendly match against Azerbaijan. He earned a total of 7 caps for his country between 2000 and 2004. His final international appearance came on 27 January 2004 in a friendly match against China.

== Managerial career ==
=== Early career and success in Kosovo ===
Ramadani began his managerial career in 2014 with the Macedonian club Shkupi, where he served two stints (2014–2015 and 2018). Between these spells, he briefly managed the Albanian club Flamurtari Vlorë in early 2016.

In 2017, Ramadani took charge of Trepça '89 in the Kosovo Superleague. He led the club to its first-ever league title in the 2016–17 season, making history as the first manager to guide a Kosovan club into UEFA Champions League qualifying. Following this success, he joined Feronikeli in 2018. During the 2018–19 campaign, Ramadani won his second Kosovo Superleague title, along with the Kosovar Cup and Supercup, completing a domestic treble.

Ramadani was appointed manager of Prishtina in September 2020. In the 2020–21 season, he guided the capital club to their first league title in eight years, securing his third championship with a third different club in Kosovo. After leaving Prishtina, he managed Egnatia in the Kategoria Superiore (2021–2022) and Gjilani (2022–2023).

=== Ohod ===
On 20 June 2023, Ramadani moved to Saudi Arabia to manage the First Division side Ohod Club. His tenure was brief, and he departed the club in September 2023.

=== Drita ===
On 30 November 2023, Ramadani returned to the Kosovo Superleague, signing a one-and-a-half-year contract with Drita. In his second season, he led Drita to the 2024–25 Kosovo Superleague title, marking his fourth league championship in Kosovo with four different teams.

This title victory qualified Drita for the 2025–26 UEFA Conference League. On 28 August 2025, Ramadani's side secured a historic qualification for the League Phase after defeating the Luxembourgish champions Differdange 03 in the play-off round. He became only the second manager, after Ilir Daja, to reach the group/league stage of a UEFA competition with a Kosovan club.

During the League Phase, Ramadani achieved a notable away victory on 6 November 2025, defeating Shelbourne FC 1–0 at Tallaght Stadium in Dublin. Following additional positive results, including a win against Shkëndija and draws against KuPS and Omonia Nicosia, Drita finished the phase with 8 points, qualifying for the knockout phase play-offs. They lost 6–4 on aggregate against Celje.

After winning the 2025-26 Football Superleague of Kosovo -his second league title with Drita, and his fifth overall-, his team lost against FK Kauno Zalgiris in the first qualifying round of the 2026-27 UEFA Champions League. Despite winning against Floriana F.C. in the extra-time in the second qualifying round of the 2026-27 UEFA Conference League, Ramadani and Drita parted ways on 31 July 2026.

=== Return to Gjilani ===
Ramadani signed for Drita local rivals SC Gjilani on 16 October 2026, returning to a club where he had been the manager in the 2022-23 Football Superleague of Kosovo, achieving a third-place finish and reaching the 2022-23 Kosovar Cup final, in which they were defeated by Prishtina. It was the only Kosovar club in which he didn't win silverware as a coach. When he was appointed for this second term, Gjilani were in the fourth position in the 2026-27 Football Superleague of Kosovo, six points behind leaders Malisheva and second-placed Prishtina (who had a game in hand).

== Managerial statistics ==
As of 7 November 2026

Coaching record by team and tenure
Team	Nat	From	To	Record							
Team	Nat	From	To	P	W	D	L	GF	GA	GD	Win %
Shkupi	(North Macedonia)	1 July 2014	4 January 2016	48	22	15	11	74	38	+36	45.83
Flamurtari	(Albania)	5 January 2016	18 May 2016	22	6	7	9	17	27	−10	27.27
Trepça '89	(Kosovo)	14 January 2017	13 September 2017	25	16	3	6	61	23	+38	64.00
Feronikeli	(Kosovo)	1 October 2017	13 December 2017	12	4	6	2	17	9	+8	33.33
Shkupi	(North Macedonia)	13 March 2018	24 August 2018	18	6	7	5	25	21	+4	33.33
Feronikeli	(Kosovo)	3 September 2018	2 August 2019	42	32	4	6	84	24	+60	76.19
Prishtina	(Kosovo)	9 September 2020	17 November 2021	63	34	13	16	105	64	+41	53.97
Egnatia	(Albania)	6 December 2021	30 June 2022	28	7	8	13	24	36	−12	25.00
Gjilani	(Kosovo)	1 July 2022	14 June 2023	44	19	15	10	53	41	+12	43.18
Ohod	(Saudi Arabia)	20 June 2023	24 September 2023	6	1	0	5	4	11	−7	16.67
Drita	(Kosovo)	30 November 2023	4 August 2026	129	66	27	36	188	125	+63	51.16
Gjilani	(Kosovo)	16 October 2026	Present	4	2	2	0	6	4	+2	50.00
Total				441	215	107	119	658	423	+235	48.75

== Honours ==
=== Player ===
Sloga Jugomagnat

- Macedonian First League: 1999–2000, 2000–01
- Macedonian Cup: 1999–2000, 2003–04

Bashkimi

- Macedonian Cup: 2004–05

Vëllazërimi

- Macedonian Second League: 2004–05

Qarabağ

- Azerbaijan Cup: 2008–09

Shkëndija

- Macedonian Second League: 2009–10

=== Manager ===
Shkupi

- Macedonian Second League: 2014–15

Trepça '89

- Kosovo Superleague: 2016–17
- Kosovar Supercup: 2017

Feronikeli

- Kosovo Superleague: 2018–19
- Kosovar Cup: 2018–19
- Kosovar Supercup: 2019

Prishtina

- Kosovo Superleague: 2020–21
- Kosovar Supercup: 2020

Drita

- Kosovo Superleague: 2024–25, 2025–26
- Kosovar Supercup: 2025
