= Intelektualët =

- Founded: 23 December 1998; 27 years ago
- Type: Ultras group
- Team: Drita; All clubs with name Drita from Gjilan
- Motto: Drita krenari, Drita Dashuri Proud Drita, Love Drita
- Location: Gjilan, Kosovo
- Arena: Gjilan City Stadium
- Colors
- Affiliations: Blue Section Crew, Blue City Defenders, Blue King Hooligans, Bojanina Blue Boys, Brigada 138, DH-B Hools, E7 Hools, Hienat, PM Mahalla, Q.Q Hools and GC Hools

Intelektualët (transl. Intellectuals) is an ultras group in Gjilan, Kosovo. Founded in January, 1998, Intelektualët are one of the major football fan groups in Kosovo and one of the largest in Southeast Europe. One thing that distinguishes this group is that they support all sports clubs named Drita in Gjilan.

== History ==
Drita in the 1997–98 championship was great wherever in Kosovo and in many sporting games. In the Gjilan Derby the board succumbed and after many debates the name Intelektualët (Intellectuals) was assigned because most of the players except they played were also writers, poets, politicians and so on.

The Intellectuals are the biggest ultras group in Kosovo, with many transfers outside Gjilan. They also have the record of audience in football of Kosovo, the biggest was against Gjilani in 2011 with 13,000 fans and they traveled also in 2002 with 30,000 fans to the final of the Kosovar Cup in the Fadil Vokrri Stadium.

== 2010s ==
Football in Kosovo began to be modernized, and the fan mentality also began to grow. The 2010s were characterized by large gatherings of supporters, especially in the derby between Drita and Gjilani

The recent years characterized as weak for the club, but although the support was one of biggest, even though Drita was at the bottom of the Kosovo Superleague table.

On 21 May 2018, in the end of championship, Prishtina allowed only 100 supporters to enter in their stadium. 100 "Intellectuals" went to Peja, they were wearing military uniforms to support the team and to protest to Football Federation of Kosovo. But a surprise happened before the game, where thousands of supporters of Drita had arrived in Peja, even though the police did not let them enter the stadium, they stayed a few meters away from the stadium, and some also climbed to the tallest buildings to see the match. But this match did not go without incident, where "Intellectuals" beat some opposing fans outside of stadium. 13 fans of Prishtina were injured. On 10 July 2018 Drita played the first qualifying match in Mitrovica. So "Intelektualët" traveled with 30 buses from Gjilan to Mitrovica, where about 10,000 supportes were present. Intellectuals unfolded a giant choreograph with the message "A road paved with sacrifice 1990 - 2018", this message was devoted to all Kosovar footballers who sacrificed everything for Kosovo football while in the return match, around 100 "Intellectuals" in Malmö, Sweden, where they unfolded a giant Flag of Albania.

On 13 August 2018 Supercup game between Drita and Prishtina, they traveled around 10 buses with Intellectuals. In this game Intellectuals threw pyrotechnics in the field, where 3 days after the match the Football Federation of Kosovo sentenced them with 2 games without supporters.
