= Gjilan derby =

Football rivalry in Kosovo

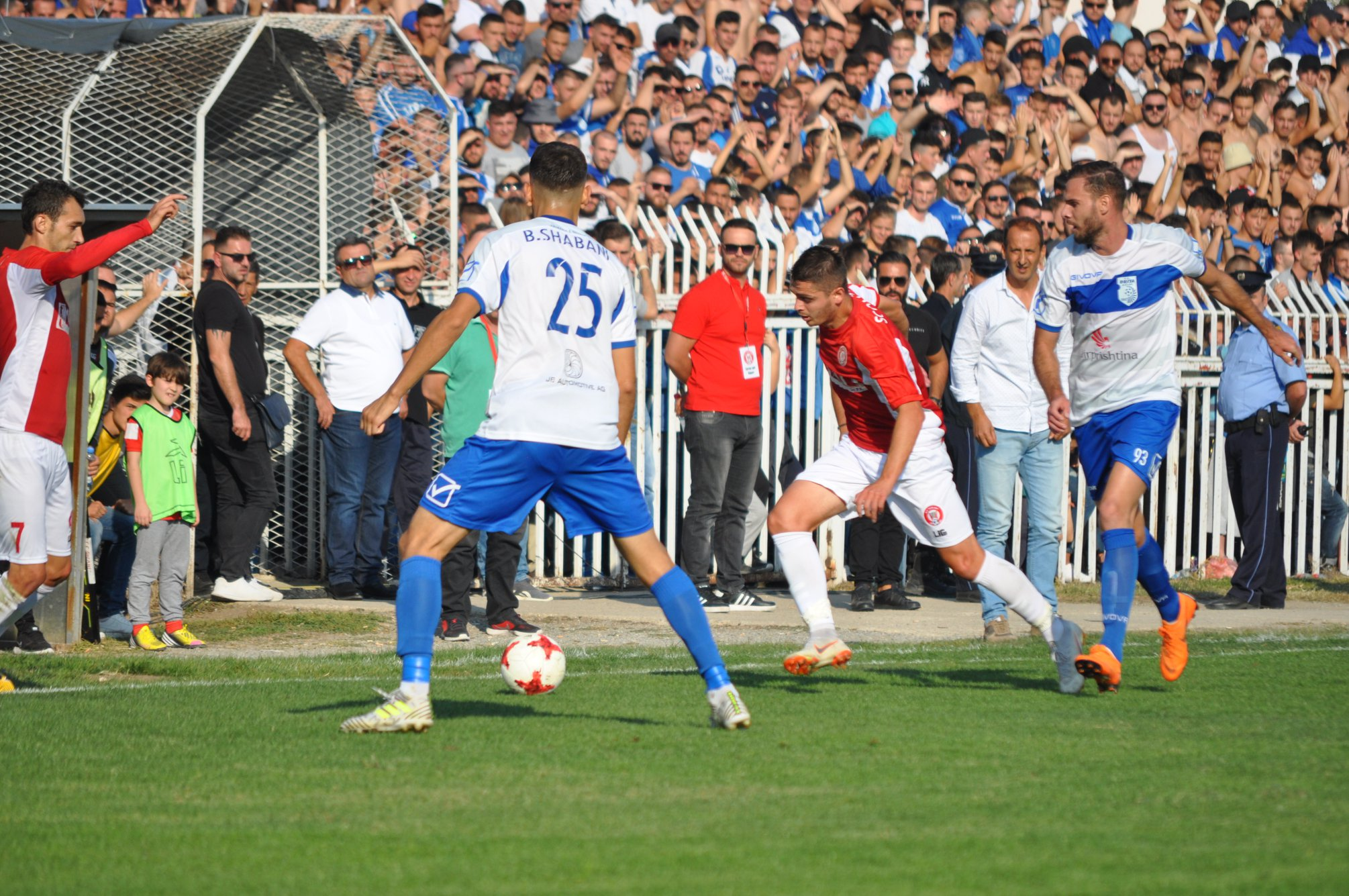
- The Gjilan derby at Gjilan City Stadium on 30 September 2018
- Other names: Anamorava Derby
- Location: Gjilan, Kosovo
- Teams: Drita; Gjilani
- First meeting: Drita 1–1 Gjilani; 1999–2000 Independent League of Kosovo (28 September 1999)
- Latest meeting: Drita 0–0 Gjilani; Football Superleague of Kosovo (17 May 2025)
- Next meeting: TBD
- Stadiums: Gjilan City Stadium

Statistics
- Total meetings: Competitive matches: 32
- Most wins: Competitive matches: Gjilani (9); Total matches: Gjilani (19)
- Largest victory: Gjilani 1–6 Drita; 2002–03 Football Superleague of Kosovo (2002)

Drita	Gjilani

The Gjilan derby (Albanian: Derbi i Gjilanit), also known as Anamorava derby (Albanian: Derbi i Anamoravës), is a football rivalry between fierce rivals Drita and Gjilani. Both of the clubs are from Gjilan, the fourth-largest city in Kosovo. The derby was started in 1995 after the split of Drita. Initially the Kosovo media did not give importance to this derby but since 2012 the media has changed opinion for the derby. The rivalry comes about as Gjilani split from Drita and thus a new club was created.

== History ==
For the past 20 years the match had attracted tens of thousands of partisan fans, even as Kosovo remained in political and sporting limbo following its war of independence from what is now Serbia between 1997 and 1998. Gjilan derby has added importance. In May, 2015, Kosovo was recognised by UEFA.

In 1995, the last stage of the championship of the Kosovo Superleague 1994/95, the main players of the Drita were dissatisfied with the leaders of the club, respectively with the treatment they had, so they split from Drita and created a new club in the city of Gjilan, which was originally called Gjilan '95

Until 1999, when the Kosovo War ended, this game was difficult to develop because the Serbian government did not allow Albanians to play at the stadiums.

Fans accused each other of lying about the foundations of the clubs. Intelektualët believe that SC Gjilani was founded in 1995 only after they inherited the FK Crvena Zvezda Gnjilane that was founded in 1945, Crvena Zvezda Gnjilane is accused by Intelektualët as a Serb nationalist club. While Skifterat accuse that FC Drita before had the name KF Poleti which was founded by Serbs and after a few years after many Albanians were in the club, for this reason the club changed its name to Drita. Both stories have been rejected by many officials from both clubs and citizen of the city.

== Supporters ==
=== Intelektualët ===
Drita, in the 1997–98 championship was a great team wherever in Kosovo and in many sporting games, the meetings started but it was difficult to name the fans. The Ballkani and Drita match was a tough game because Ballkani fought for the survival and Drita for champion, so the fans traveled to Suva Reka for the last time without a name after this game, before the game against biggest rival Gjilani, the board succumbed and after many debates the name Intelektualët (Intellectuals) was assigned because most of the players except they played were also writers, poets, politicians and so on.

The Intellectuals are the biggest ultras group in Kosovo, with many transfers outside Gjilan. They also have the record of audience in football of Kosovo, the biggest was against Gjilani in 2011 with 13,000 fans and they traveled also in 2002 with 30,000 fans to the final of the Kosovar Cup in the Fadil Vokrri Stadium.

=== Skifterat ===
Skifterat (Falcons) are the clubs ultras group. They are formed in 1999, and are the biggest rivals of Drita supporters.

=== Incidents ===
The great rivalry among these teams has also led to hooliganism. A few days before the game is played, the tensions between the two groups increase, where there have been mass incidents between them. Even often they have conquered the pitch of stadium to face each other.

== Official match results ==
Source: Dates are in dd/mm/yyyy form.

- SF = Semi-final
- QF = Quarter-final
- R16 = Round of 16
- R32 = Round of 32
- GS = Group stage
- R1 = Round 1
- R2 = Round 2

Drita win Draw Gjilani win

#	Date	Home	Away	Result
1.	1999	Drita	Gjilani	1–1
2.	1999–2000	Drita	Gjilani	3–0
3.	1999–2000	Gjilani	Drita	3–1
4.	2000–01	Drita	Gjilani	0–0
5.	2000–01	Gjilani	Drita	3–0
6.	2001–02	Gjilani	Drita	0–1
7.	2001–02	Drita	Gjilani	3–0
8.	2002–03	Drita	Gjilani	0–0
9.	2002–03	Gjilani	Drita	1–6
10.	2007–08	Drita	Gjilani	1–1
11.	2007–08	Gjilani	Drita	2–0
12.	2008–09	Gjilani	Drita	2–1
13.	2008–09	Drita	Gjilani	1–3
14.	2010–11	Drita	Gjilani	0–0
15.	2010–11	Drita	Gjilani	0–0
16.	2011–12	Gjilani	Drita	0–1
17.	2011–12	Drita	Gjilani	2–0
18.	2011–12	Drita	Gjilani	2–1
19.	2015–16	Drita	Gjilani	0–3
20.	2015–16	Gjilani	Drita	0–2
21.	2015–16	Drita	Gjilani	0–1
22.	2016–17	Drita	Gjilani	0–1
23.	2016–17	Gjilani	Drita	0–2
24.	2016–17	Drita	Gjilani	0–1
25.	26 February 2017	Gjilani	Drita	1–1
26.	20 May 2017	Gjilani	Drita	0-1
27.	28 September 2017	Drita	Gjilani	1–1
28.	3 December 2017	Gjilani	Drita	0–0
29.	2 May 2018	Gjilani	Drita	1–1
30.	30 September 2018	Gjilani	Drita	1–0
31.	16 February 2019	Drita	Gjilani	3–1
32.	4 July 2019	Gjilani	Drita	0–0
33.	29 September 2019	Gjilani	Drita	0–1
34.	16 February 2020	Drita	Gjilani	2–0
35.	18 July 2020	Drita	Gjilani	0–2
36.	18 October 2020	Drita	Gjilani	0–0

== Statistics ==
Matches	Wins Drita	Wins Gjilani	Draws	Goals Drita	Goals Gjilani
Drita	9	11	8	25	29
Gjilani	9	9	3	26	27
Total	17	19	11	57	56

== See also ==
- List of association football club rivalries in Europe
