= Ahmed Januzi =

Albanian footballer (born 1988)

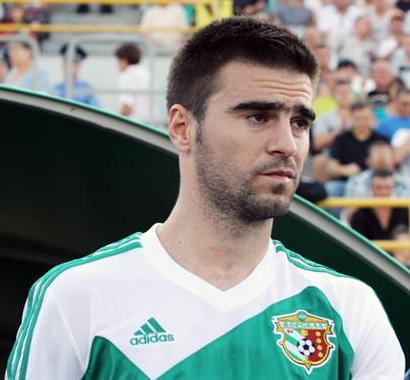
- Januzi with Vorskla Potlava in 2013

Personal information
- Date of birth: 8 July 1988 (age 38)
- Place of birth: Vučitrn, SFR Yugoslavia (present-day Vushtrri, Kosovo)
- Height: 1.84 m (6 ft 0 in)
- Position: Striker

Youth career
- –2006: Kosova Vushtrri

Senior career*
Years	Team	Apps	(Gls)
2006–2007	Besa Kavajë	30	(7)
2007–2015	Vorskla Poltava	169	(28)
2016–2018	Prishtina	18	(11)
2018–2019	Llapi	35	(20)
2019—2020	Prishtina	26	(14)
2020–2021	Llapi	27	(5)
2021–2023	Dukagjini	26	(7)
2023–2025	Llapi	59	(15)

International career^{‡}
2009–2010	Albania U21	7	(1)
2010–2013	Albania	8	(0)
- * Club domestic league appearances and goals as of 26 June 2025 ‡ National team caps and goals as of 23 December 2015

Ahmed Januzi (born 8 July 1988) is a former professional footballer who played as a striker. Born in Kosovo, he represented the Albania national team.

== Club career ==
=== Early career ===
Ahmed Januzi was born in Vučitrn to Kosovar Albanian parents.

=== Prishtina ===
On 14 June 2016, Januzi returned to Kosovo by completing a transfer to Prishtina, signing a one-year contract, and taking the vacant squad number 27. He was presented on the same day along with players such as Armend Dallku and Debatik Curri, his former international teammates. During the 2016–17 season, he made 18 league appearances and scored 2 goals as Prishtina finished runner-up in the championship, securing a spot Europa League first qualifying round.

== International career ==
=== Under-21 ===
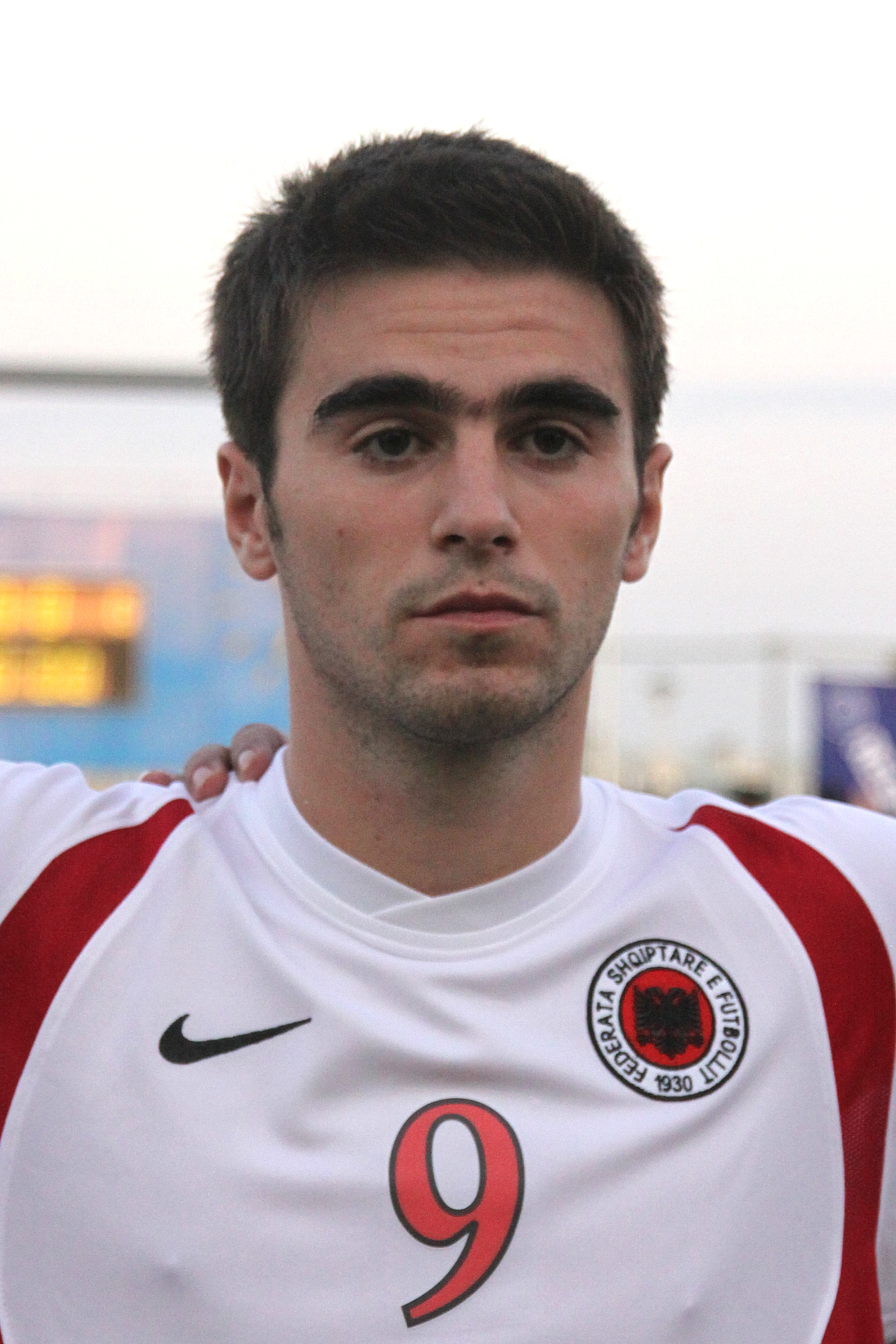
Januzi starting for Albania U21 in 2009

Januzi was part of Albania under-21 squad in the qualifiers of 2011 UEFA European Under-21 Championship. He was the main striker, collecting six matches and scoring one goal. He made his under-21 debut on 28 March 2008 in the first match against Scotland which finished in a 0–1 home defeat. His first under-21 goal came in his fifth appearance for the team in the 4–2 away loss to Belarus. Albania finished Group A in fourth place tied on points with Azerbaijan.

=== Senior ===
Januzi made his senior international debut on 17 November 2010 during the goalless home draw against Macedonia by appearing as a substitute in the second half. A year later, Januzi received his second call up by coach Josip Kuže for the last UEFA Euro 2012 qualifying matches against France and Romania on 7 and 11 October 2011 respectively. He played in both matches as substitute and collected 60 minutes, making his competitive debut in the process.
