= Rexhep Rexhepi Stadium =

Multi-purpose stadium in Glogovac, Kosovo

- Stadiumi Rexhep Rexhepi
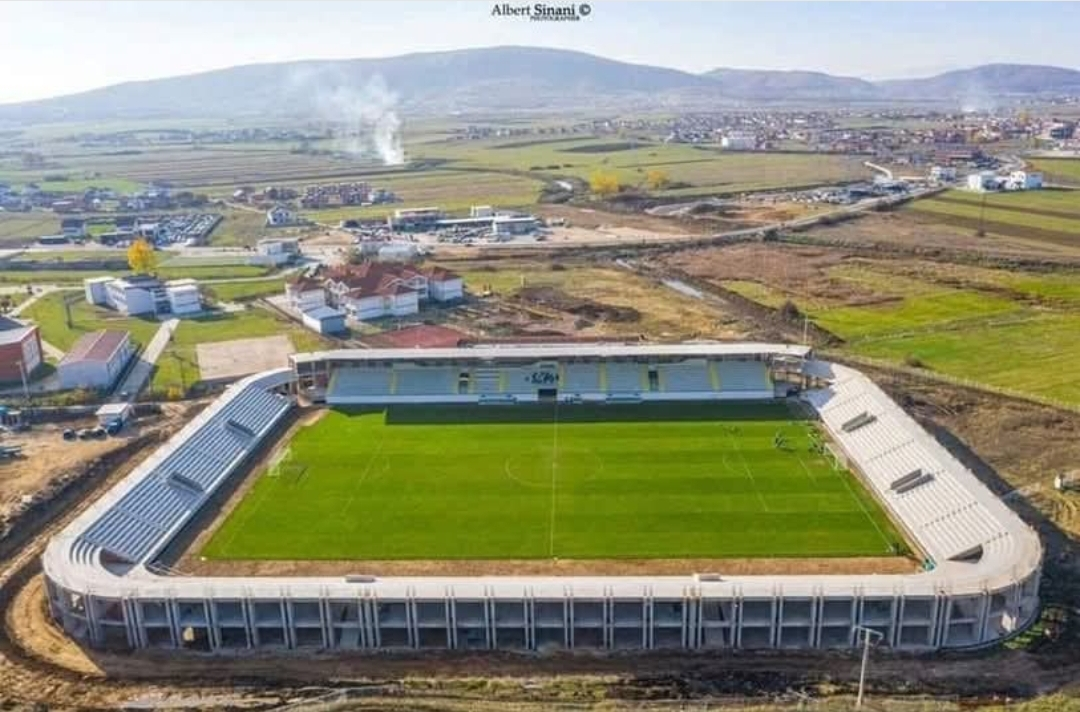
- Interactive map of Rexhep Rexhepi Stadium
- Full name: Stadiumi Rexhep Rexhepi
- Location: Drenas, Kosovo
- Coordinates: 42.616446°N 20.903551°E
- Owner: Munipacity of Drenas
- Operator: KF Feronikeli
- Capacity: 6,500
- Surface: Grass
- Scoreboard: LED
- Field size: 105 by 68 metres (114.8 yd × 74.4 yd)

Construction
- Built: 1976
- Opened: 1976
- Renovated: 2012-2015, 2020–2023
- Cost: €200,000 (2012-2015)

Tenant
- KF Feronikeli

The Rexhep Rexhepi Stadium is located in Drenas, Kosovo, and serves as the home ground for KF Feronikeli, a football club that competes in the Football Superleague of Kosovo. The stadium is named after Rexhep Rexhepi, a former player and captain of KF Feronikeli who was also a member of the Kosovo Liberation Army and was killed during the Kosovo War in 1999.

== Renovation ==
In December 2012 work began on the ground in order to renovate the single stand, the playing field as well as the clubhouse, with funding coming from the Ministry of Culture, Youth and Sports. In January 2014 the local municipality began to seek investment form the central government and the Ministry of Culture, Youth and Sports to complete a full renovation of the stadium in order to convert into a 2,000 all seater stadium, and this was granted on 23 May 2014, when the Ministry of Culture, Youth and Sports along with the Gllogoc municipality signed the agreement to invest €100,000 into a three-stage renovation process. The entire project cost a total of €200,000, and stage two was completed during the 2014–15 season, while the third stage was completed after the end of the season in the summer of 2015.
