= Gjilan City Stadium =

Football stadium in Gjilan, Kosovo

- Agim Ramadani ^{for SC Gjilani} Selami Osmani ^{for FC Drita}
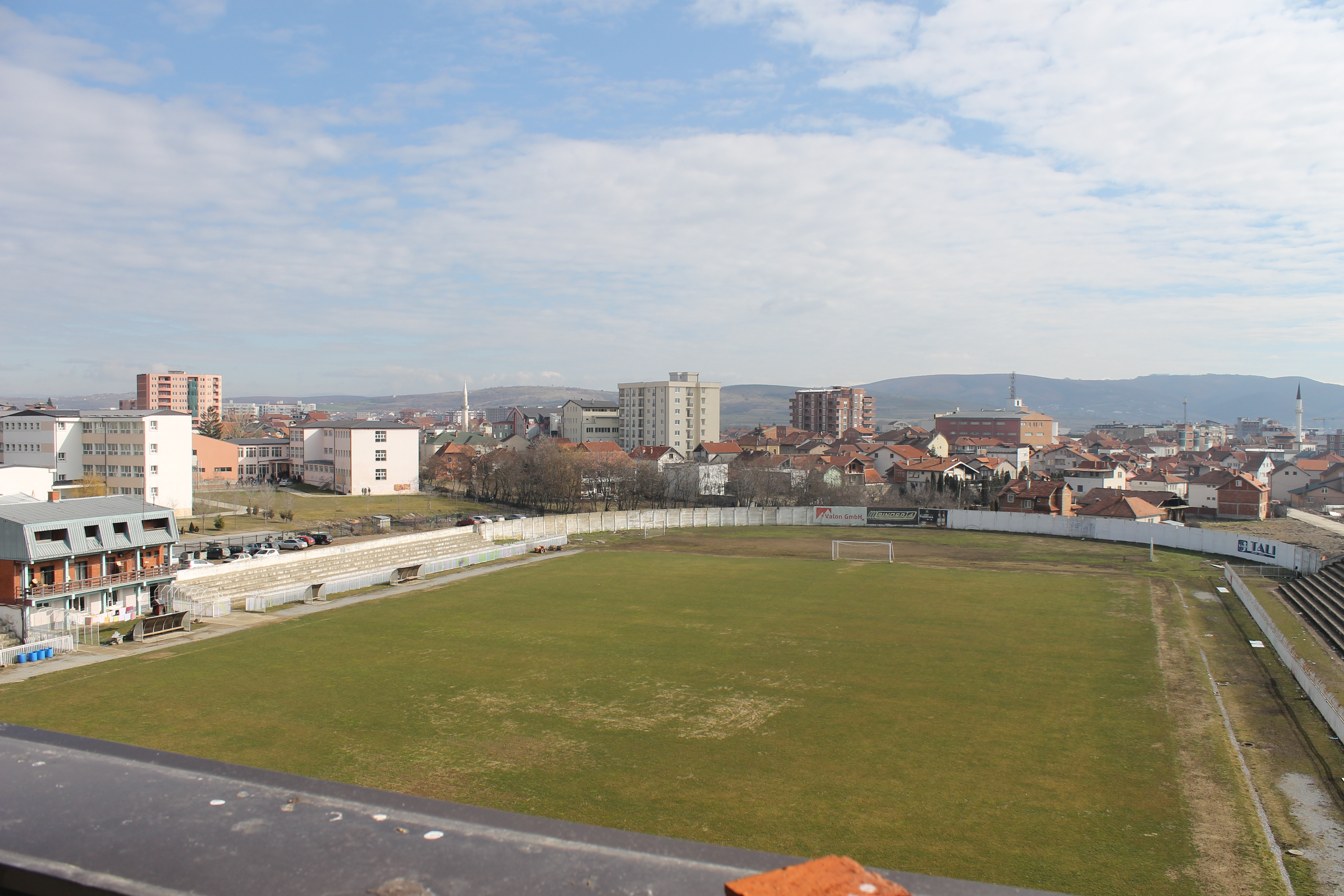
- Interactive map of Gjilan City Stadium
- Location: Gjilan, Kosovo
- Coordinates: 42°28′00″N 21°27′52″E
- Owner: Municipality of Gjilan
- Operator: FC Drita; SC Gjilani
- Capacity: 9,500(after renovation)
- Surface: Grass
- Scoreboard: LED (After renovation)
- Record attendance: 20.000, ^{6 November 2011}
- Field size: 105 by 68 metres (114.8 yd × 74.4 yd)

Construction
- Opened: 1967
- Renovated: 2015, 2017-Ongoing
- Closed: 2017-ongoing
- Demolished: 2017
- Cost: €21.000.000 (All phases of 2017)

Tenants
- FC Drita; SC Gjilani

The Gjilan City Stadium (Albanian: Stadiumi i Qytetit të Gjilanit) is a football stadium in Gjilan, Kosovo. It is currently used mostly for football matches and is the home ground of SC Gjilani and FC Drita of the Kosovo Superleague. The stadium was completed in 1967 but since 2017 is in the process of renovation.

== History ==
The Gjilan City Stadium, located in the city of Gjilan, Kosovo, has a rich history closely tied to local football culture. The stadium has been home to two of the most prominent football teams in Kosovo, KF Drita and SC Gjilani, both of which compete in the Kosovo Super League.

The stadium, originally built during the Yugoslav era, has served as a key venue for football in the region. However, over time, it became evident that the stadium's infrastructure was inadequate for modern football standards, prompting calls for renovation.

In April 2017, re-construction of the Gjilan City Stadium started. This project was projected to be completed after three years, with a capacity of 15,000 seats. The stadium is designed as the fourth category according to UEFA regulations. The reconstruction value of the stadium is 6 million euros. Tribunes will be built even after the gates, while a part of the stands will be covered. There will be reflectors and the stadium will be foreseen to have about 10,000 seats.

The renovations were supposed to have been completed by October 2020, but the project was interrupted in 2022, when the Municipality of Gjilan terminated the contract with the contracted company. Despite these setbacks, the Ministry of Culture, Youth, and Sports, in cooperation with the Gjilan Municipality, allocated €12 million for the stadium's renovation. In May 2025, a new contract was signed.

== Name ==
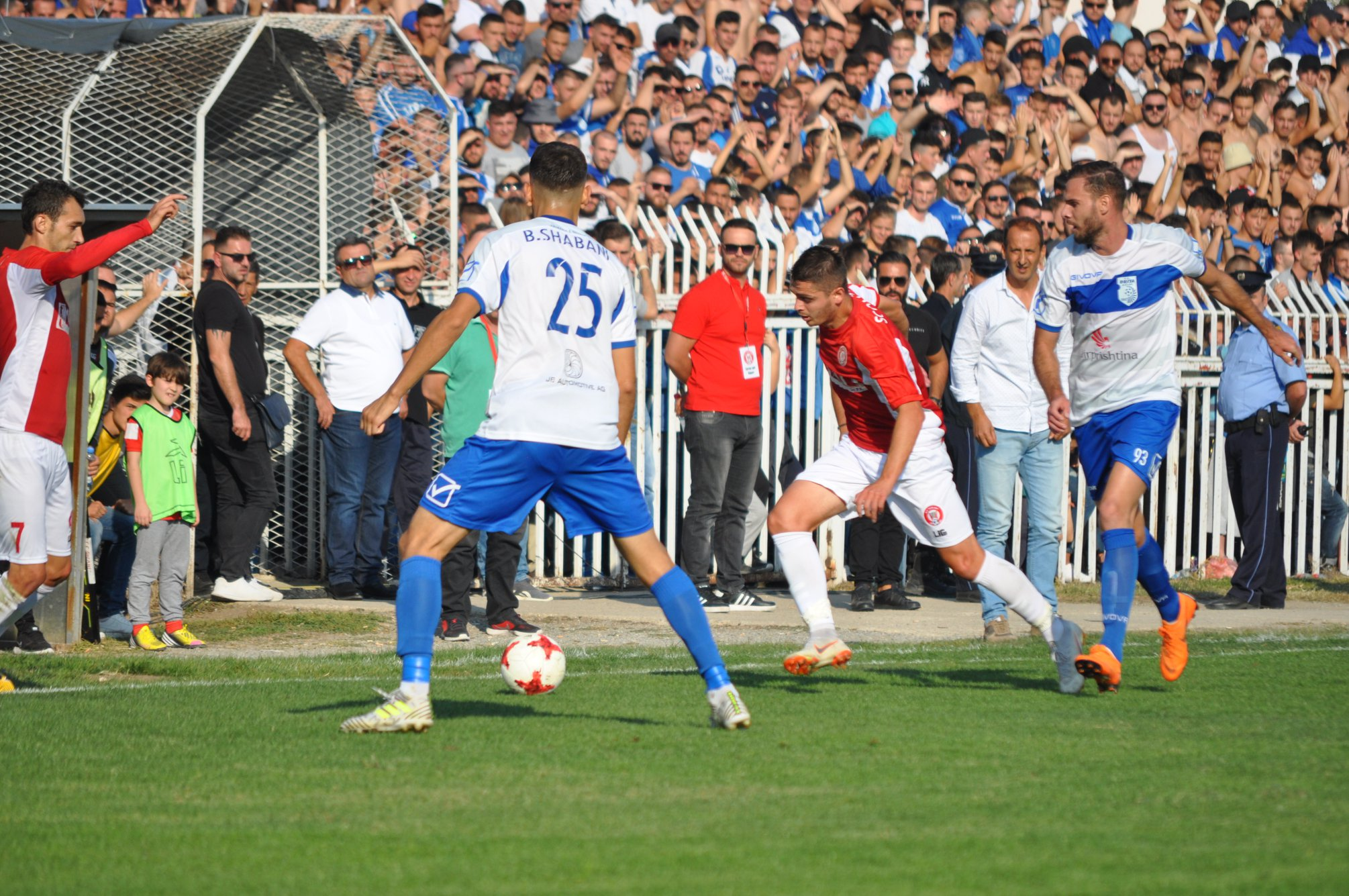
The Gjilan derby at Gjilan City Stadium on 30 September 2018

Fans of the two clubs of the city of Gjilan. The Intellectuals of FC Drita and Skifterat of SC Gjilani, have named the stadium of the city according to their wishes. Intellectuals have stressed that the stadium has the name of Selami Osmani - Bezi, while Skifterat named Agim Ramadani. But officially the stadium is called "Gjilan City Stadium".
