= KF Vllaznia Pozheran =

Association football club in Kosovo

Vllaznia Pozheran
- Full name: Klubi Futbollistik Vllaznia Pozheran
- Nickname(s): Tigrat (The Tigers)
- Founded: 1973; 52 years ago
- Ground: Ibrahim Kurteshi Stadium
- Coordinates: 42°22′0″N 21°20′0″E
- Owner: Ardian Kurteshi
- Manager: Erdin Hashani
- League: Kosovo First League
- 2022–23: Kosovo First League – Group B, 6th of 10
Home colours	Away colours

KF Vllaznia Pozheran (Klubi Futbollistik Vllaznia Pozheran) is a football club based in Pozharan, Viti, Kosovo. The club played in the top division of football in Kosovo, Football Superleague of Kosovo for first time in the 2017–18 season and ended up getting relegated after finishing in the last place.
