= FC Drita =

Association football club in Kosovo

Dritа
- Full name: Football Club Drita (Albanian: Klubi Futbollistik Drita)
- Nickname: Intelektualët (Intellectuals)
- Short name: DFC or DRI
- Founded: 1947; 79 years ago
- Ground: Gjilan City Stadium
- Capacity: 9,000
- Owner: Flamur Bunjaku
- President: Valon Murseli
- Manager: Ardian Nuhiu
- League: Kosovo Superleague
- 2025–26: Kosovo Superleague, 1st of 10 (champions)
- Website: www.dritafc.com
Home colours	Away colours	Third colours

Football Club Drita (Albanian: Klubi Futbollistik Drita), commonly known as Drita, is a professional football club based in Gjilan, Kosovo. The club competes in the Kosovo Superleague.

The club's home ground is the Gjilan City Stadium. It was built in 1947 when the club played within the Yugoslav league system. However, from 1990 until the end of the Kosovo War, the club split in two different clubs with one team staying as the official club, playing in the home stadium and league system.

== History ==
In 1947, Drita was founded by Gjilan citizens, the name Drita meaning 'light' in Albanian and the name was taken from other sports clubs from the city. In the beginning, conditions were difficult, even more so because the team rivaled the other team of the city, Crvena zvezda Gnjilane. Contrary to them, Drita founders and footballers were exclusively Albanians. This insistence in nationalistic differentiation meant that, in 1952 the team was abolished by the regime. Former footballers went to the already multi-ethnic team of Zvezda, but the team didn't get erased completely. They competed in the Kosovo Province League where they were declared champions in the 1962–63 season.

=== Post-1990 ===
In 1991, at the time of the dissolution of Yugoslavia. the football of Kosovo was in its zenith and consistently had 4-5 clubs in both federal leagues. But the deterioration of the political situation was also reflected in sports. In 1991, Albanian separatist complaining about the situation, formed the Football Federation of Kosovo with all its organs. Drita then joined the new league system in Kosovo, where they played in the fields of the mountains around the city of Gjilan.

=== Selami Osmani era ===
After the 90s, Drita was taken into management by Selami Osmani - Bezi with whom for 15 years reached the tops of Kosovan football, thanks to the players that brought in Gjilan, he who for 15 years contributed to Drita. Under his management Drita managed to adorn the title of the Kosovo championship in 2002–03, win the cup in 2000–01 and be a runner-up in 1999–2000 and 2001–02. Drita also reached the semifinals in 1999–00, 2001–02, and 2002–03, breaking a Kosovo record that for four consecutive years did not descend below the third position and for four years at least until the semifinals of the Kosovar Cup.

=== Valon Murseli and Flamur Bunjaku era ===
On 21 July 2016, Valon Murseli and Flamur Bunjaku took over the club, the two businessmen promised big things to the club, where in 2017–18 they relied on them, by winning the title for the second time in their history.

=== Ardian Nuhiu era ===
After starting working in the club as assistant coach of Shpëtim Duro in 2018, Ardian Nuhiu was named first team manager in 2019. On 22 July 2020, he won the 2019-20 Football Superleague of Kosovo.

In the semi-final of preliminary round of the 2020-21 UEFA Champions League qualifying, Drita won against Inter Club d'Escaldes. But they were not allowed to play the final against Linfield FC three days later. The Northern Irish team was awarded a 3–0 win after the match was cancelled due to Drita players testing positive for SARS-CoV-2.

After finishing as runner-up in the 2020-21 Football Superleague of Kosovo, two points under champions FC Prishtina, Drita entered the 2021-22 UEFA Conference League. After defeating FK Dečić from Montenegro in the first qualifying round, Nuhiu's team faced Feyenoord in the second round. The first leg ended with a 0–0 draw in Pristina. In the return leg, Drita lost 3–2, with Guus Til scoring the winner for the Dutch side in the added time.

Drita was again the runner-up in the 2021-22 Football Superleague of Kosovo and also lost the final of the 2021-22 Kosovar Cup against FC Llapi. In the 2022-23 UEFA Conference League, they defeated Inter Turku from Finland in the first qualifying round but were knocked out by Belgian side Antwerp in the second round.

Nuhiu left the club on 24 November 2022 after the defeat in the 2022-23 Kosovar Cup against Liria Prizren.

=== Zekirija Ramadani era ===
Zekirija Ramadani became the head coach of Drita on 30 November 2023.

Drita won the 2024-25 Football Superleague of Kosovo under Ramadani on 4 May 2025.

During the 2025–26 season, Drita became the first club from Kosovo to reach the second qualifying round of the UEFA Champions League by defeating Differdange 03 4–2 on aggregate. They also became the second club from Kosovo to reach the final stage of a European competition by defeating Differdange 03 again during the 2025–26 UEFA Conference League play-off round.

On 6 November 2025, Drita won in the Tallaght Stadium in Dublin against Shelbourne FC its first ever game in a final stage of a European competition. After winning also against Shkëndija Tetovo and having previously drawn against KuPS and Omonia Nicosia, Drita finished the League Phase of the Conference League with 8 points and qualified for the knockout phase play-offs. They lost 6–4 on aggregate against Celje.

After winning the 2025-26 Football Superleague of Kosovo -his second league title with Drita, and his fifth overall-, his team lost against FK Kauno Zalgiris in the first qualifying round of the 2026-27 UEFA Champions League. Despite winning against Floriana F.C. in the extra-time in the second qualifying round of the 2026-27 UEFA Conference League, Ramadani left Drita on 31 July 2026.

=== Second Ardian Nuhiu era ===
On 10 August 2026, Nuhiu returned to Drita replacing Zekirija Ramadani. His first month was very difficult, as Drita was knocked out of the 2026-27 UEFA Conference League in the Play-Off round after losing against Inter Club d'Escaldes in the penalty shoot-out.

== Support ==
Intelektualët
- Founded: 23 December 1998; 27 years ago
- Type: Ultras group
- Team: All clubs with name Drita from Gjilan
- Motto: No one likes us, we don't care
- Location: Gjilan, Kosovo
- Arena: Gjilan City Stadium
- Colors
- Affiliations: Blue City Defenders, Blue Section Crew, Blue King Hooligans, Bojanina Blue Boys, Brigada 138, DH-B Hools, E7 Hools, Hienat, PM Mahalla, Q.Q Hools and GC Hools

In the 1997–98 season, Drita had a great support in Kosovo, but their fans group had not a name. After a game against Ballkani in which the supporters travelled to Suva Reka and just before a game against their biggest rival Gjilani, a meeting was held and the name Intelektualët (Intellectuals) was assigned because most of the players were also writers, poets and politicians.

The Intellectuals are the biggest ultras group in Kosovo, with many travels to watch games outside of Gjilan. They also have the record of audience in football of Kosovo: in a derby against Gjilani in 2011, 13,000 fans attended the game. In 2002, 30,000 fans travelled to the final of the Kosovar Cup in the Fadil Vokrri Stadium.

=== Incidents ===
Also at Intelektualët (Intellectuals) there are groups of hooligans who do incidents especially during the derby towards Gjilani.

But there are also other incidents with other groups, The incident with Plisat of Prishtina was where during the last game of the championship there was attack on the fans of Prishtina, the worst incident was the violation of the fans of Prishtina by the hooligans from Gjilan where 13 fans were injured.

== Club rivalries ==
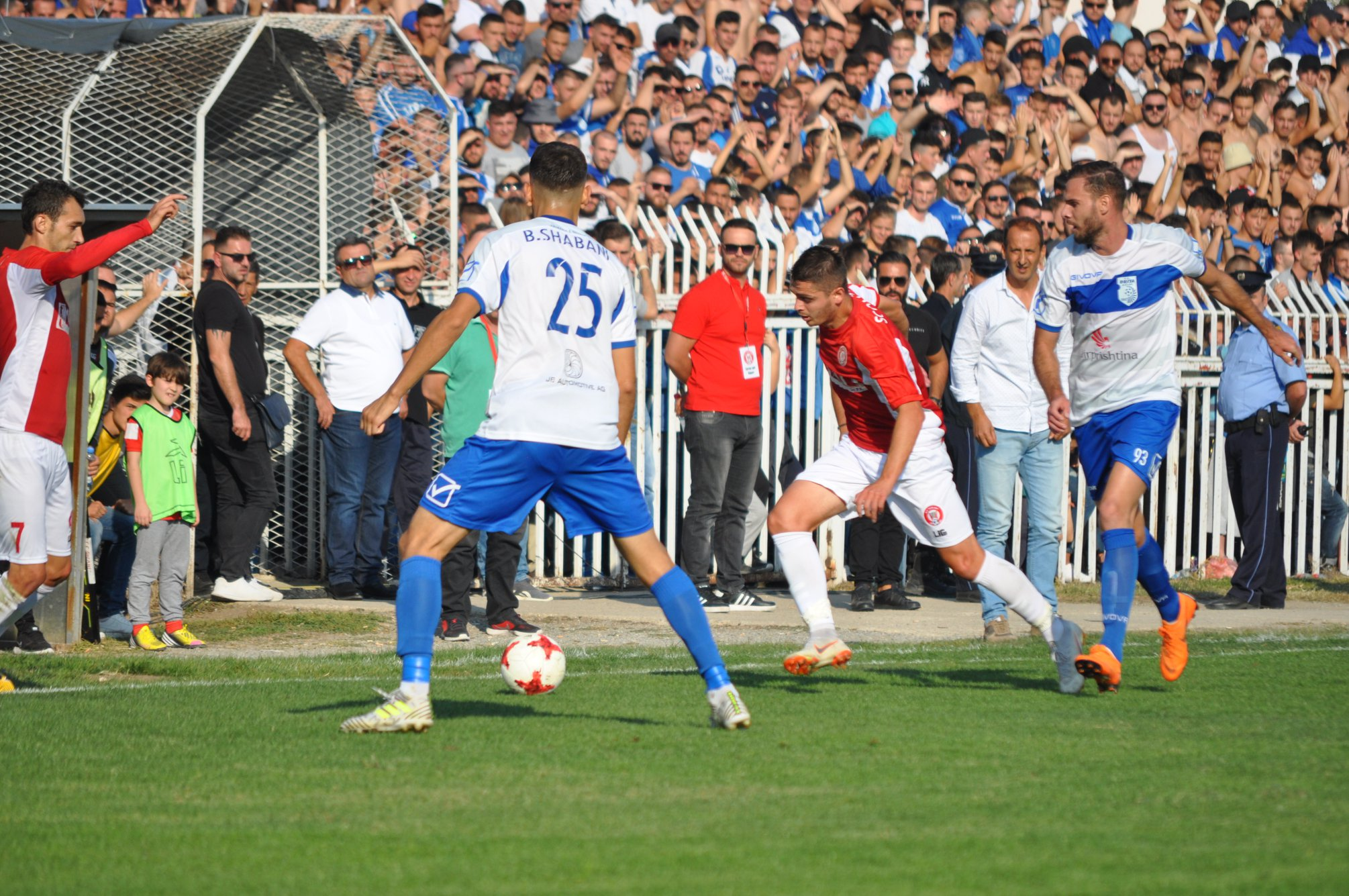
The Kosovo Derby at Gjilan City Stadium on 30 September 2018

=== Gjilani ===
There is a fierce rivalry in the Football Superleague of Kosovo, where the game between Drita and Gjilani is known as the Anamorava Derby. According to the tradition of the city of Gjilan, the party starts with fans organization, who try to give the maximum support for the respective clubs from Skifterat (Falcons) and Intelektualët (Intellectuals).

Three days before the match, the derby's recreational areas such as bars are flooded with people, everywhere in the cafe bars is an atmosphere that occurs only during national holidays, where fans are seen by both the Skifterat (Falcons) and Intelektualët (Intellectuals) to anticipate the soccer match.

One hour before the match, the two camps are organized in groups and always avoid eventual incidents between the two ultras groups. They divide the streets from where they will go to the stadium, because the Kosovo Police organised themselves in a way to avoid the breakdown of this holiday and the much anticipated confrontation in Gjilan.

For a brief few moments, everything apart from the dozens of flares that littered the pitch, that'd had disappeared from view. Gone were the two white minarets that usually overlook the stadium in eastern Kosovo. Gone too were the lines of riot police patrolling the front of the main stand along with the 10,000 strong crowd, all enveloped in a monstrous blue cloud of smoke. On the other side of the pitch, a similar scene was being played out, but the consuming cloud was red. The only evidence of a football match being played was the thunderous noise of drums and chants rising ethereally from the fog.

== Records and statistics ==
Drita in the 2017–18 season has not suffered any losses, so it has broken its record since 2002–03 season with 30 undefeated games.

Accomplishment	Record	Ref
Players
Most matches	(Kosovo) Artan Latifi with 241 match	
Most goals	(Kosovo) Xhevdet Shabani with 63 goals	
Team records
Biggest ever European victory	4–1 away against (Gibraltar) Lincoln Red Imps, 29 June 2018	
Biggest ever European defeat	0–3 home against (Sweden) Malmö, 10 July 2018	
Biggest ever European defeat	0–3 w/o neutral against (Northern Ireland) Linfield, 2020	
Longest unbeaten run at all competitions	31 games in 2017–18 season	
Longest unbeaten run at Kosovo Superleague	29 games in 2017–18 season	
Longest unbeaten run at Kosovo Superleague	30 games in Kosovo Superleague between 2 seasons	

== Kit evolution ==
After the war, the financial condition of clubs did not allow them to look after their kits, it happened that within a season the club's shirts have changed. But since joining UEFA and FIFA, this problem has disappeared. During the presentation of Betim Haxhimusa, they also unveiled the new kits that would be worn in the 2018–19 season, while the traditional colors are interwoven in a design inspired by the famous sportswear brand Givova. While in the UEFA Champions League match against Malmö in Sweden, Drita played with their third kits making the presentation in public for the first time.

=== Period ===
1999–2016: Home / Away; No manufacturer	2016–2018: Home / Away; (Italy) Givova	2018–: Home / Away / Third; (Italy) Givova (2018–2019), (Italy) Macron (2019–)

== Stadium ==
The club has played its home games at the Gjilan City Stadium (Albanian: Stadiumi i Qytetit të Gjilanit) is a multi-purpose stadium in Gjilan, Kosovo. The stadium has a capacity of 10,000 people all seater. Since 2017, the stadium is under renovation as it does not meet any level required by UEFA and the goal is to get the stadium to become a fourth-tier UEFA stadium.

== Honours ==
FC Drita honours
Type	Competition	Titles	Seasons/Years
Domestic	Kosovo Superleague	5	2002–03, 2017–18, 2019–20, 2024–25, 2025–26
Domestic	Kosovar Supercup	2	2017–18, 2025–26
Domestic	Kosovar Cup	1	2000–01
Domestic	Kosovo Province League	1	1962–63

== Players ==
=== Current squad ===
As of 1 September 2026

Note: Flags indicate national team as defined under FIFA eligibility rules; some limited exceptions apply. Players may hold more than one non-FIFA nationality.

No.	Pos.	Nation	Player
1	GK	KOS	Faton Maloku
2	DF	KOS	Besnik Krasniqi (vice-captain)
3	DF	MKD	Blerton Sheji
4	MF	KOS	Rron Broja (captain)
5	DF	COL	Juan Camilo Mesa
6	DF	GHA	Hasan Gomda
7	MF	KOS	Igball Jashari
8	MF	GER	Vesel Limaj
9	FW	KOS	Arb Manaj
10	DF	KOS	Liridon Balaj
14	MF	KOS	Albert Dabiqaj
16	MF	ALB	Marsel Ismailgeci
17	FW	KOS	Oniks Grezda
19	FW	ALB	Blerim Krasniqi

No.	Pos.	Nation	Player
21	DF	MLI	Abdoul Karim Danté
22	GK	KOS	Laurit Behluli
23	MF	ALB	Eduart Rroca
24	MF	BEL	William Baeten
25	DF	KOS	Altin Bytyçi
26	DF	CGO	Raddy Ovouka
28	DF	ALB	Agan Mjaki
32	DF	ALB	Jorgo Pëllumbi
36	MF	KOS	Ilir Mustafa
55	DF	ALB	Hajdin Salihu
74	GK	KOS	Eron Isufi
77	FW	ALB	Kristal Abazaj
93	MF	FRA	Kemehlo Nguena
99	FW	GHA	Mike Arthur

== Personnel ==
Current technical staff
Position	Name
Head coach	(North Macedonia) Ardian Nuhiu
Assistant coach	(Kosovo) Visar Sermaxhaj
General manager	(Kosovo) Jetmir Salihu
Goalkeeping coach	(Kosovo) Afrim Shahini
Physiotherapist	(Kosovo) Fatlum Vranja
Physiotherapist	(Kosovo) Valbon Hoxha
Doctor	(Kosovo) Bujar Fazliu
Conditioning Coach	(Turkey) Abdullah Biricik
Board members
Office	Name
President	(Kosovo) Valon Murseli
President	(Kosovo) Flamur Bunjaku
General director	(Kosovo) Feti Murseli
Sporting director	(Kosovo) Valon Zymeri

== List of managers ==
Below is a list of Drita managers from 1999, until the present day.

- (Kosovo) Reshat Osmani (1999–2000)
- (Kosovo) Kemajl Halimi (1999–2000)
- (Kosovo) Bylbyl Sokoli (2000–01)
- (Kosovo) Kemajl Halimi (2001–02)
- (Kosovo) Fadil Muriqi (2001–02)
- (Kosovo) Hysni Maxhuni (2002 as caretaker)
- (Kosovo) Ramadan Cimili (2002–03)
- (Kosovo) Kemajl Halimi (2003 as caretaker)
- (Kosovo) Muharrem Sahiti (2003–04)
- (Kosovo) Reshat Osmani (2007 as caretaker)
- (Kosovo) Milaim Zuzaku (2007–08)
- (Kosovo) Refik Rexhepaj (2008 as caretaker)
- (Kosovo) Milaim Zuzaku (2008–09)
- (Kosovo) Bekim Isufi (2011–12)
- (Kosovo) Arbnor Morina (2012–13)
- (Kosovo) Musa Selimi (2013)
- (Kosovo) Arbnor Morina (2013)
- (Kosovo) Bekim Isufi (2013–14)
- (Kosovo) Agron Selmani (2014)
- (Kosovo) Afrim Shahini (2014–15)
- (Kosovo) Sadat Pajaziti (2015)
- (Kosovo) Bekim Isufi (2015–16)
- (Bosnia and Herzegovina) Amir Alagić (2016)
- (Kosovo) Ismet Munishi (2016)
- (Kosovo) Milaim Zuzaku (2016–17)
- (Kosovo) Bekim Isufi (2017–18)
- (Albania) Shpëtim Duro (2018–19)
- (North Macedonia) Ardian Nuhiu (2019–2022)
- (Kosovo) Arsim Thaqi (2022–2023)
- (Greece) Akis Vavalis (2023)
- (North Macedonia) Zekirija Ramadani (2023–2026)
- (Kosovo) Visar Sermaxhaj (2026)
- (North Macedonia) Ardian Nuhiu (2026–)

== Drita in Europe ==

2018–19 UEFA Champions League preliminary round final starting lineup vs. Lincoln Red Imps (4–4–2)

Drita competed in the UEFA Champions League for the first time in the 2018–19 season, entering at the preliminary round. On 12 June 2018, in Nyon, the draw was held and Drita were drawn against the Andorran side FC Santa Coloma. On 26 June 2018, Drita beat Santa Coloma at Victoria Stadium in Gibraltar and became the first Kosovar side to win a UEFA Champions League match.

After being eliminated from Malmö, Drita continued to play in the second qualifying round of UEFA Europa League. On 17 July 2018, Drita learns the upcoming rival which was the champion of 2017–18 Luxembourg National Division, F91 Dudelange.

=== By competition ===
As of 18 December 2025

Competition	P	W	D	L	GF	GA	GD	Win %
UEFA Champions League	10	5	0	5	12	14	−2	50.00
UEFA Europa League	6	1	1	4	7	11	−4	16.67
UEFA Europa Conference League	29	13	5	11	25	31	−6	44.83
Total	45	19	6	20	44	56	−12	42.22

=== Matches ===
Season	Competition	Round	Opponent	Home	Away	Agg.
2018–19	UEFA Champions League	PR	(Andorra) Santa Coloma	2–0 (a.e.t.)		
2018–19	UEFA Champions League	PR	(Gibraltar) Lincoln Red Imps	4–1 (a.e.t.)		
2018–19	UEFA Champions League	1Q	(Sweden) Malmö	0–3	0–2	0–5
2018–19	UEFA Europa League	2Q	(Luxembourg) F91 Dudelange	1–1	1–2	2–3
2020–21	UEFA Champions League	PR	(Andorra) Inter d'Escaldes	2–1		
2020–21	UEFA Champions League	PR	(Northern Ireland) Linfield	0–3 (awarded)		
2020–21	UEFA Europa League	2Q	(North Macedonia) Sileks	2–0		
2020–21	UEFA Europa League	3Q	(Poland) Legia Warsaw	0–2		
2021–22	UEFA Europa Conference League	1Q	(Montenegro) Dečić	2–1	1–0	3–1
2021–22	UEFA Europa Conference League	2Q	(Netherlands) Feyenoord	0–0	2–3	2–3
2022–23	UEFA Europa Conference League	1Q	(Finland) Inter Turku	3–0	0–1	3–1
2022–23	UEFA Europa Conference League	2Q	(Belgium) Antwerp	0–2	0–0	0–2
2023–24	UEFA Europa Conference League	2Q	(Czech Republic) Viktoria Plzeň	1–2	0–0	1–2
2024–25	UEFA Conference League	2Q	(Iceland) Breiðablik	1–0	2–1	3–1
2024–25	UEFA Conference League	3Q	(Latvia) Auda	3–1 (a.e.t.)	0–1	3–2
2024–25	UEFA Conference League	PO	(Poland) Legia Warsaw	0–1	0–2	0–3
2025–26	UEFA Champions League	1Q	(Luxembourg) Differdange 03	1–0	3–2	4–2
2025–26	UEFA Champions League	2Q	(Denmark) Copenhagen	0–1	0–2	0–3
2025–26	UEFA Europa League	3Q	(Romania) FCSB	1–3	2–3	3–6
2025–26	UEFA Conference League	PO	(Luxembourg) Differdange 03	2–1	1–0	3–1
2025–26	UEFA Conference League	LP	(Finland) KuPS	1–1		20th
2025–26	UEFA Conference League	LP	(Cyprus) Omonia	1–1		20th
2025–26	UEFA Conference League	LP	(Republic of Ireland) Shelbourne	1–0		20th
2025–26	UEFA Conference League	LP	(North Macedonia) Shkëndija	1–0		20th
2025–26	UEFA Conference League	LP	(Netherlands) AZ Alkmaar	0–3		20th
2025–26	UEFA Conference League	LP	(Spain) Rayo Vallecano	0–3		20th
2025–26	UEFA Conference League	KPO	(Slovenia) Celje	2–3	2–3	4–6
2026–27	UEFA Champions League	1Q	(Lithuania) Kauno Žalgiris	2–3	1–1	3–4
2026–27	UEFA Conference League	2Q	(Malta) Floriana	2–1 (a.e.t.)	1–1	3–2
2026–27	UEFA Conference League	3Q	(San Marino) Tre Fiori	5–0	4–1	9–1
2026–27	UEFA Conference League	PO	(Andorra) Inter d'Escaldes	2–2	0–0 (a.e.t.)	2–2 (2–4 p)

=== UEFA club coefficient ranking ===
As of 21 December 2025

Rank	Team	Points
111	(Finland) HJK	14.000
112	(Israel) Hapoel Be'er Sheva	14.000
113	(Kosovo) Drita	13.625
114	(Gibraltar) Lincoln Red Imps	13.500
115	(Netherlands) Twente	13.500

== See also ==
- Gjilan Derby
