= KF Llapi =

Football club in Kosovo

Llapi
- Full name: Klubi Futbollistik Llapi (Football Club Llapi)
- Nickname: Legjendat (Legends)
- Founded: 5 July 1932; 94 years ago
- Ground: Zahir Pajaziti Stadium
- Capacity: 3,312
- Owner: Batatina family
- President: Beqir Batatina
- Manager: Tahir Batatina
- League: Kosovo Superleague
- 2025–26: Kosovo Superleague, 8th of 10
- Website: www.kfllapi.com
Home colours	Away colours	Third colours

Klubi Futbollistik Llapi (Football Club Llapi), commonly known as Llapi, is a professional football club based in Podujevë, Kosovo.

The club plays in the Kosovo Superleague, which is the top tier of football in the country.

== History ==
KF Llapi was founded on 5 July 1932, becoming the oldest club in Podujevë. The club was known as FK Lab (Serbo-Croatian: Fudbalski klub Lab) during Yugoslav period.

=== Reorganization ===
In 2013, KF Llapi with the aim of better organization with the initiation of the municipality of Podujevë led by Mayor Agim Veliu, held the electoral assembly with the board of directors who supported the long-term project presented by Nexhat Dumnica as president and Tahir Batatina as chief of the technical staff and thus began the mission towards the Kosovo Superleague, with clear ambitions and clear organization. In the first meeting of the football fund, club leaders Nexhat Dumnica and Muhamet Hasani presented their plan for a revived Llapi financially and with new goals.

== European record ==
As of match played 25 July 2024

Season	Competition	Round	Opponent	Home	Away	Agg.
2021–22	UEFA Europa Conference League	1Q	(North Macedonia) Shkupi	1–1	0–2	1–3
2022–23	UEFA Europa Conference League	1Q	(Montenegro) Budućnost Podgorica	2–2	0–2	2–4
2024–25	UEFA Europa League	1Q	(Poland) Wisła Kraków	1–2	0–2	1–4
2024–25	UEFA Conference League	2Q	(Denmark) Brøndby IF	2–2	0–6	2–8

== Players ==
=== Current squad ===
As of 1 September 2026

Note: Flags indicate national team as defined under FIFA eligibility rules; some limited exceptions apply. Players may hold more than one non-FIFA nationality.

No.	Pos.	Nation	Player
1	GK	NED	Tein Troost
2	DF	BIH	Enedin Mulalić
3	DF	KOS	Arbnor Aliu
4	DF	KOS	Bujar Idrizi
5	DF	KOS	Fuad Ajvazi
6	DF	KOS	Gentrit Jaha
7	MF	KOS	Arianit Hasani
8	DF	KOS	Benjamin Emini (captain)
9	FW	MKD	Fiton Ademi
10	MF	KOS	Arbnor Ramadani
11	MF	CRO	Pjero Škarić
12	GK	ALB	Vokli Laroshi
14	MF	NED	Joep Kluskens
15	DF	KOS	Gentrit Hetemaj
17	DF	KOS	Edison Kqiku
18	DF	KOS	Ilir Blakçori
19	FW	NED	Yaid Marhoum

No.	Pos.	Nation	Player
20	DF	MKD	Nikola Najdovski
21	FW	KOS	Mërgim Cërnavërni
22	MF	KOS	Rilind Hetemi
23	MF	KOS	Loris Kolgeci
25	MF	SUI	Ammar Munishi
26	FW	KOS	Benjamin Zyberi
27	FW	MKD	Zani Nazifi
30	GK	KOS	Aridon Bllaca
31	MF	KOS	Arlind Maloku
33	GK	KOS	Miran Qela
34	DF	ALB	Agon Xhaka
37	DF	SUI	Aris Sörensen
44	FW	ALB	Drilon Sadiku
53	DF	SUI	Sami Bashaj
70	FW	CMR	Abdoulaye Yahaya
97	FW	TOG	Kevin D'Almeida
99	GK	GER	Maximilian Grote

=== Out on loan ===
Note: Flags indicate national team as defined under FIFA eligibility rules; some limited exceptions apply. Players may hold more than one non-FIFA nationality.

No.	Pos.	Nation	Player
28	MF	KOS	Blendion Llalloshi (at Vjosa until 30 June 2027)
29	FW	KOS	Enes Beqiri (at Vjosa until 30 June 2027)
82	DF	BIH	Haris Ibrišagić (at Vushtrria until 30 June 2027)

No.	Pos.	Nation	Player
—	GK	KOS	Erijon Salihu (at Lepenci until 30 June 2027)
—	MF	KOS	Endi Halili (at Mitrovica until 30 June 2027)
—	MF	KOS	Milot Nazifi (at Vjosa until 30 June 2027)

=== Retired numbers ===
Two days after the death of Fadil Vokrri, a former footballer of KF Llapi who later served as president of the Football Federation of Kosovo from 16 February 2008 until his death on 9 June 2018, KF Llapi decided to retire the number 9 shirt as a posthumous honour.

However, during the period 2022–2026, the number was occasionally used by Alef Firmino (2022–23), Muhamet Hyseni (2023–24), Mërgim Cërnavërni (2024–25), Axel Gnapi (2025–26) and Fiton Ademi (2026–present).

Note: Flags indicate national team as defined under FIFA eligibility rules; some limited exceptions apply. Players may hold more than one non-FIFA nationality.

No.	Pos.	Nation	Player
9	FW	KOS	Fadil Vokrri (1976–79) – posthumous honour (2018–2022)

== Personnel ==
As of 29 July 2020

Current technical staff
Position	Name
Head coach	(Kosovo) Tahir Batatina
Assistant coach	(Albania) Ahmed Januzi
Assistant coach	(Kosovo) Mehmet Agushi
Conditional coach	(France) Youssef Eddagni
Goalkeeping coach	(Kosovo) Bekim Mulliqi
Doctor	(Kosovo) Albon Uka
Physiotherapist	(Kosovo) Dion Kastrati
Board members
Office	Name
President	(Kosovo) Beqir Batatina
Vice-president	(Kosovo) Bahri Ademi
Chief Financial Officer	(Kosovo) Muhamet Batatina
Secretary	(Kosovo) Muhamet Rexhepi
Head of Media and Communications	(Kosovo) Petrit Miftari
Team Organiser	(Kosovo) Besart Hoti
Photographer	(Kosovo) Elvir Syla

=== Historical list of coaches ===
Name	Date Appointed	Date Dismissed	Time in office	Matches	Points per match
Tahir Batatina (Kosovo)	20 Mar 2019	-	-	-	-
Xhengis Rexhepi (North Macedonia)	Dec 2018	19 Mar 2019	-	-	-
Bekim Shotani (Kosovo)	9 Oct 2018	19 Dec 2018	-	-	-
Bylbyl Sokoli (Kosovo)	Jul 2018	10 Oct 2018	-	-	-
Tahir Batatina (Kosovo)	Jul 2014	Jun 2018	-	-	-

== Club records ==
- Most capped player: (Kosovo) Benjamin Emini 288
- Most goals: (Kosovo) Muhamet Hyseni 45
- Youngest Goal Scorer: (Kosovo) Elvir Gashijan (17 years 01 months 25 days)
- Oldest Goal Scorer: (Albania) Besar Musolli (37 years 01 months 11 days)

=== Kosovo Superleague ===
- 2019/2020 - 6th
- 2018/2019 - 3rd
- 2017/2018 - 3rd

=== Cup record ===
==== Kosovar Cup ====
- Winners (2): 2020–21, 2021–22

Season	Round	Opposition	Score
2024/2025	Final	FC Prishtina	0:1
2022/2023	Semi-Finals	SC Gjilani	1:3 (over two legs)
2021/2022	Final	FC Drita	1:2
2020/2021	Final	KF Dukagjini	1:1, 4:3 on pens
2019/2020	Second round	KF Feronikeli	0:1
2018/2019	Second round	KF Trepça '89	0:2
2017/2018	Quarter-Finals	FC Prishtina	4:5 on pens
2016/2017	Final	FC Besa Pejë	3:5 on pens
2015/2016	Semi-Finals	FC Prishtina	1:4 (over two legs)
