= SC Gjilani =

Football club in Kosovo

Gjilani
- Full name: Sport Club Gjilani
- Nickname: Skifterat (Falcons)
- Founded: 1945; 81 years ago as FK Crvena Zvezda Gnjilane/Ylli i Kuq Gjilan
- Ground: Gjilan City Stadium
- Capacity: 15,000
- Owners: Local investors: Afrim Veliu; Fatlum Pireva; Qëndrim Demiri; Shaban Bajrami; Valmir Emini
- Chairman: Afrim Veliu
- Manager: Debatik Curri
- League: Kosovo Superleague
- 2025–26: Kosovo Superleague, 5th of 10
- Website: scgjilani.com
Home colours	Away colours

Sport Club Gjilani (Albanian: Klubi Futbollistik Gjilani), commonly known as Gjilani, is a professional football club based in Gjilan, Kosovo. The club plays in the Kosovo Superleague, which is the top tier of football in the country.

SC Gjilani was formed in 1995 by Afrim Kqiku and is regarded as the successor of Crvena Zvezda Gnjilane/Ylli i Kuq Gjilan from 1945.

Five years after its foundation, they won the Kosovar Cup and got a promotion to the top-level Kosovar league, the Football Superleague of Kosovo.

== Supporters ==
Skifterat
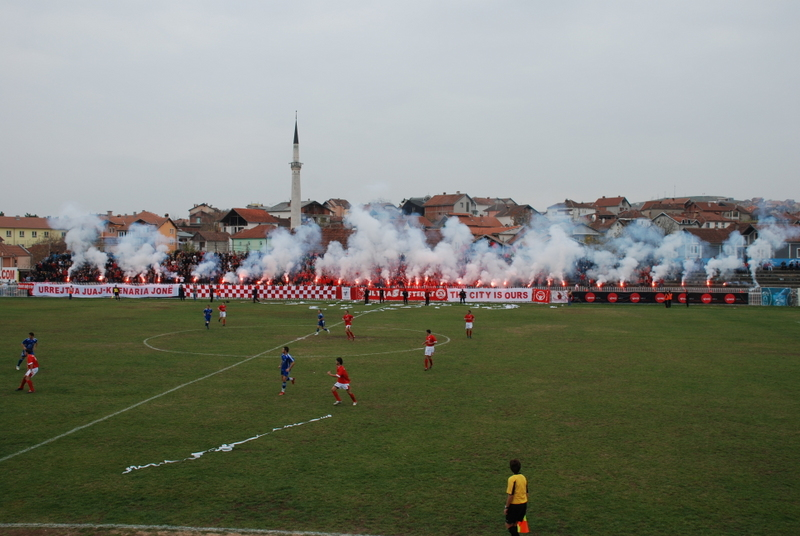
- Skifterat during a match
- Founded: 1999; 27 years ago
- Type: Ultras club
- Team: Gjilani
- Location: Gjilan, Kosovo
- Arena: Gjilan City Stadium
- Colors

Skifterat is the club's ultras group which formed in 1999 after Kosovo war. They are also known as the Red and White Boys. They were named after a KLA brigade called the Falcons.

=== Incidents ===
At Skifterat, there were groups of hooligans who do incidents especially during the derby against Drita. There have also been other incidents involving hooligans coming to blows with one another which ended up with some injured. There was an incident between the fans of Gjilan and Drenica and also the most dangerous incident was between Gjilan and Vëllaznimi in 2017–18 season, where 23 people injured. There have also been incidents of burning of flags of countries like Serbia, North Macedonia, Greece, or Montenegro.

== Club rivalries ==
=== Drita ===
There is often a fierce rivalry between Drita and Gjilani. The game between these two teams is known as the Gjilan Derby. The derby, according to the tradition of the city of Gjilan, the party starts with fans organizations showing spirit for their respective teams.

== Crest and colours ==
The club's first design and colours were created in 1995, with red and white in the center with a circle and ball that formed the badge of the club. In 2000, the colours were changed by the new president of the club to purple and light blue, but early into the 2008–09 season at the initiative of the leadership of Gjilan's supporter club Skifterat (Falcons), the colours were changed back to red and white.

== Stadium ==
The club plays its home games at the Gjilan City Stadium (Albanian: Stadiumi i Qytetit të Gjilanit). It is a multi-purpose stadium in Gjilan, Kosovo. The stadium has a capacity of 10,000 people all seater.

== Honours ==
SC Gjilani honours
Type	Competition	Titles	Seasons/Years
Domestic	Kosovar Cup	1	1999–2000
Domestic	Kosovar Supercup	1	1999–2000

== European record ==
Gjilani competed in the UEFA Europa League for the first time in the 2020–21 season, entering at the preliminary round. On 9 August 2020, the draw was held and Gjilani were drawn against Sammarinese side Tre Penne. On 21 August 2020, Gjilani beat the Sammarinese side Tre Penne at San Marino Stadium in Serravalle.

Season	Competition	Round	Opponent	Home	Away	Agg.
2020–21	UEFA Europa League	PR	(San Marino) Tre Penne	3–1		
2020–21	UEFA Europa League	1Q	(Cyprus) APOEL	0–2 (a.e.t.)		
2022–23	UEFA Europa Conference League	1Q	(Latvia) Liepāja	1–0	1–3	2–3
2023–24	UEFA Europa Conference League	1Q	(Luxembourg) Progrès Niederkorn	0–2	2–2	2–4

== Players ==
=== Current squad ===
As of 1 September 2026

Note: Flags indicate national team as defined under FIFA eligibility rules; some limited exceptions apply. Players may hold more than one non-FIFA nationality.

No.	Pos.	Nation	Player
1	GK	CRO	Marijan Ćorić
2	DF	KOS	Armend Thaqi (captain)
3	DF	KOS	Arbër Potoku
4	DF	KOS	Ardian Limani
6	MF	KOS	Lorik Boshnjaku
7	MF	KOS	Oltion Bilalli
8	MF	KOS	Robert Rrahmani
9	FW	KOS	Mevlan Zeka
10	FW	KOS	Bleart Tolaj
11	MF	KOS	Milazim Bajraktari
12	GK	KOS	Rrezon Matoshi
13	DF	KOS	Eugen Ramadani
14	MF	KOS	Blerind Morina

No.	Pos.	Nation	Player
15	DF	KOS	Granit Jashari
16	DF	MKD	Besart Krivanjeva
19	MF	KOS	Arjol Bllaca
20	DF	KOS	Olt Haziri
23	MF	KOS	Hamdi Namani
24	MF	KOS	Ermal Sadiku
29	FW	KOS	Elton Isufi
30	GK	KOS	Loran Gërbovci
33	DF	KOS	Yll Ibrahimi
34	DF	KOS	Davud Sylaj
77	MF	KOS	Dior Gërbovci
91	FW	KOS	Gentrit Klaiqi
92	FW	KOS	Riol Hasani

== Personnel ==
Current technical staff
Position	Name
Head coach	(North Macedonia) Ardian Nuhiu
Assistant coach	(Kosovo) Agim Maliqi
Assistant coach	(Kosovo) Alban Hyseni
Assistant coach	(Kosovo) Shallah Sherifi
Goalkeeping coach	(Kosovo) Afrim Ajdini
Physiotherapist	(Kosovo) Nysret Rexhepi
Doctor	(Kosovo) Arben Bislimi
Board members
Office	Name
President	(Kosovo) Florim Zuka
Executive director	(Kosovo) Sevdail Robelli
Financial director	(Kosovo) Arlind Behluli
Sports director	(Kosovo) Naser Ajeti
Secretary	(Kosovo) Roland Ajeti
Media Officer	(Kosovo) Mërgim Qerimi

== Managerial history ==
- (Serbia and Montenegro) Muharrem Sahiti (2002–2004)
- (Kosovo) Muharrem Sahiti (2007–2009)
- (Kosovo) Musa Selimi (12 Jul 2014 – 19 Apr 2015)
- (Kosovo) Sadat Pajaziti (12 Jul 2015 – 5 Nov 2015)
- (Kosovo) Bylbyl Sokoli (6 Nov 2015 – 5 Apr 2016)
- (Kosovo) Arbnor Morina (17 Apr 2016 – 11 Apr 2018)
- (Kosovo) Alban Hyseni (12 Apr 2018 – Jun 2018)
- (Kosovo) Sadat Pajaziti (Jul 2018 – 20 Feb 2019)
- (Kosovo) Alban Hyseni (Feb 2019 – Mar 2019)
- (Albania) Gentian Mezani (20 Mar 2019 – Nov 2020)
- (Kosovo) Bylbyl Sokoli (Nov 2020 – Mar 2022)
- (Kosovo) Ismet Munishi (Mar 2022 – Apr 2022)
- (Kosovo) Alban Hyseni (Apr 2022 – Jun 2022)
- (North Macedonia) Zekirija Ramadani (Jun 2022 – Jun 2023)
- (Albania) Klodian Duro (Jun 2023 – Aug 2023)
- (Albania) Gentian Mezani (Aug 2023 – May 2024)
- (North Macedonia) Ardian Nuhiu (Jun 2024 –)
