= 2017–18 KF Skënderbeu Korçë season =

Skënderbeu Korçë
2017–18 season
- President: Ardian Takaj
- Head coach: Ilir Daja
- Stadium: Skënderbeu Stadium
- Kategoria Superiore: Winners
- Albanian Cup: Winners
- Europa League: Group stage
- Top goalscorer: League: Ali Sowe (21); All: Ali Sowe (28)
Home colours	Away colours	Third colours

Skënderbeu Korçë are an Albanian football team which are based in Korçë. During the 2017/18 campaign they will compete in the following competitions: Kategoria Superiore, Albanian Cup, UEFA Europa League.

== Players ==
As of 21 January 2018

Note: Flags indicate national team as defined under FIFA eligibility rules; some limited exceptions apply. Players may hold more than one non-FIFA nationality.

No.	Pos.	Nation	Player
1	GK	ALB	Orges Shehi (Captain)
3	DF	ALB	Gledi Mici
4	DF	ALB	Bruno Lulaj
5	DF	KOS	Bajram Jashanica
6	DF	KOS	Fidan Aliti
7	MF	ALB	Enis Gavazaj
8	MF	MLI	Bakary Nimaga
9	FW	ALB	Sebino Plaku
10	FW	KOS	Donjet Shkodra
11	MF	KOS	Leonit Abazi
12	GK	ALB	Mario Dajsinani
13	MF	ALB	Jorgo Pëllumbi
14	FW	CZE	Martin Nešpor
17	MF	ALB	Gjergji Muzaka
18	FW	MNE	Goran Vujović
18	MF	ETH	Beneyam

No.	Pos.	Nation	Player
19	DF	ALB	Tefik Osmani
21	MF	KOS	Suad Sahiti
22	MF	ALB	Bruno Dita
26	MF	ALB	Afrim Taku
27	MF	ALB	Liridon Latifi
32	DF	ALB	Kristi Vangjeli
33	DF	CRO	Marko Radaš
44	MF	ALB	Uerdi Mara
77	FW	IRI	Reza Karimi
78	FW	NGR	James Adeniyi
88	MF	ALB	Sabien Lilaj
90	FW	GAM	Ali Sowe
95	GK	ALB	Aldo Teqja
97	MF	ALB	Nazmi Gripshi
98	MF	ALB	Anteo Osmanllari

- Italics players who left the team during the season.
- Bold players who came in the team during the season.

== Pre-season and friendlies ==
15 June 2017	Videoton (Hungary)	1–0	(Albania) Skënderbeu
17:30 CET

15 June 2017	Rabotnički (North Macedonia)	1–1	(Albania) Skënderbeu
17:30 CET		Summary

== Competitions ==
=== Kategoria Superiore ===
==== League table ====
Pos	Team	Pld	W	D	L	GF	GA	GD	Pts	Qualification or relegation
1	Skënderbeu (Note: In March 2018, Skënderbeu was handed a 10-year ban from UEFA club competitions over match fixing.) (C)	36	22	6	8	68	41	+27	72	
2	Kukësi	36	18	9	9	61	41	+20	63	Qualification to the Champions League first qualifying round
3	Luftëtari	36	16	11	9	47	37	+10	59	Qualification to the Europa League first qualifying round (Note: Skënderbeu qualified for the Europa League first qualifying round by winning the 2017–18 Albanian Cup. However, since they were banned from entering UEFA competitions, the spot awarded to the cup winners was passed down the league.)
4	Laçi	36	16	8	12	45	39	+6	56	Qualification to the Europa League first qualifying round
5	Partizani	36	15	8	13	41	36	+5	53	Qualification to the Europa League first qualifying round

Source: Albanian Football Association (in Albanian), Soccerway
Rules for classification: 1) Points; 2) Head-to-head points; 3) Head-to-head goal difference; 4) Head-to-head goals scored; 5) Goal difference; 6) Goals scored; 7) Draw.
(C) Champions

==== Results summary ====
Overall								Home						Away					
Pld	W	D	L	GF	GA	GD	Pts	W	D	L	GF	GA	GD	W	D	L	GF	GA	GD
36	22	6	8	68	41	+27	72	14	1	3	38	19	+19	8	5	5	30	22	+8

Last updated: 23 May 2018.
Source: Competitive matches

==== Results by round ====
Round	1	2	3	4	5	6	7	8	9	10	11	12	13	14	15	16	17	18	19	20	21	22	23	24	25	26	27	28	29	30	31	32	33	34	35	36
Ground	H	A	H	A	H	H	A	H	A	A	H	A	H	A	A	H	A	H	H	A	H	A	H	H	A	H	A	A	H	A	H	A	A	H	A	H
Result	W	D	W	W	W	W	W	W	W	D	D	D	W	L	W	W	L	W	W	W	W	D	W	W	D	W	L	W	W	W	L	L	W	L	L	L
Position	1	1	1	1	1	1	1	1	1	1	1	1	1	1	1	1	1	1	1	1	1	1	1	1	1	1	1	1	1	1	1	1	1	1	1	1

Source: Competitive matches
A = Away; H = Home; W = Win; D = Draw; L = Loss

==== Matches ====
9 September 2017 1	Skënderbeu	2–0	Flamurtari	Korçë
20:00 CET	Lilaj 2' (pen.); Radaš (yellow card) 21'; Muzaka 64'	Report	Sidibe (yellow card) 6'; Useini (yellow card) 21'; Položani (yellow card) 29'; Jakovljević (yellow card) 57'	Stadium: Skënderbeu Stadium; Attendance: 3,000; Referee: Adrian Beqiri

18 September 2017 2	Kamza	1–1	Skënderbeu	Kamëz
16:00 CET	Neziri (yellow card) 16'; Rezi 67'	Report	Shkodra 28'; Lilaj (yellow card) 80'	Stadium: Kamëz Stadium; Attendance: 2,000; Referee: Klajdi Kola

23 September 2017 3	Skënderbeu	2–0	Partizani	Korçë
19:00 CET	Sowe 65'; Lilaj 86' (pen.)	Report	Batha (yellow card) 55'; La Camera (yellow card) 58'	Stadium: Skënderbeu Stadium; Attendance: 4,200; Referee: Remzi Sadiku

2 October 2017 4	Kukësi	1–2	Skënderbeu	Kukës
14:00 CET	Bakaj 37'; Calé (yellow card) 76'	Report	Dita 31'; Lilaj 84' (pen.)	Stadium: Zeqir Imeri Stadium; Attendance: 1,500; Referee: Kridens Meta

12 October 2017 5	Skënderbeu	2–1	Laçi	Korçë
17:00 CET	Ademir 27' (o.g.); Jashanica 75'; Vangjeli (yellow card) 83'	Report	Lushkja 58'; Sefgjinaj (yellow card) 77'	Stadium: Skënderbeu Stadium; Attendance: 3,000; Referee: Klodian Shahini

15 October 2017 6	Skënderbeu	2–1	Lushnja	Korçë
17:00 CET	Taku 20', 42'; Sowe 75'; Adeniyi 80'	Report	Sefa 29'; Mone (yellow card) 53'; Bizhyti (yellow card) 66'	Stadium: Skënderbeu Stadium; Attendance: 1,500; Referee: Orlando Kuka

23 October 2017 7	Teuta	1–4	Skënderbeu	Durrës
17:00 CET	Amadu 7'; Shkalla (yellow card) 42'; Dedić (yellow card) 46'	Report	Adeniyi (yellow card) 37'; Osmani (yellow card) 47'; Taku 50'; Mici (yellow card) 60'; Lilaj 67' (pen.); Sowe 72'; Muzaka 77' (pen.)	Stadium: Niko Dovana Stadium; Attendance: 1,000; Referee: Klajdi Kola

28 October 2017 8	Skënderbeu	2–0	Luftëtari	Korçë
17:00 CET	Lilaj 4' (pen.); Aliti (yellow card) 53'; Vangjeli (yellow card) 66'; Gavazaj 80'	Report	Ruçi (yellow card) 4'; Ramadani (yellow card) 68'; Zguro (yellow card) 78'	Stadium: Skënderbeu Stadium; Attendance: 800; Referee: Olsid Ferataj

5 November 2017 9	Vllaznia	0–2	Skënderbeu	Korçë (Note: The match was held at Skënderbeu Stadium due to reconstruction of the field of Loro Boriçi Stadium.)
14:00 CET	Krymi (yellow card) 43'	Report	Taku 57'; Sowe 85'	Stadium: Skënderbeu Stadium; Attendance: 800; Referee: Mario Apap (Malta)

=== Albanian Cup ===
==== First round ====
6 September 2017 First leg	Adriatiku	0–8	Skënderbeu	Mamurras
16:00 CET		Report	Kelmendi 17'; Muzaka 37', 53' (pen.); Shkodra 63'; Nešpor 77'; Demte 79'; Sowe 80', 86'	Stadium: Mamurras Stadium; Attendance: 600; Referee: Erald Demiraj

5 October 2017 Second leg	Skënderbeu	9–1 (17–1 agg.)	Adriatiku	Korçë
14:00 CET	Nešpor 4', 17'; Shkodra 7'; Mara 11', 25'; Gripshi 38'; Eqerem Liqeri 65'; Lulaj 68'; Taku 86'	Report	Trungshi 71'	Stadium: Skënderbeu Stadium; Attendance: 300; Referee: Xhulio Mema

==== Second round ====
29 November 2017 First leg	Besëlidhja	0–1	Skënderbeu	Lezhë
14:00 CET	Bajri (yellow card) 21'; Dyca (yellow card) 38'	Report	Kelmendi 27'; Teqja (yellow card) 49'; Nimaga (yellow card) 63'	Stadium: Brian Filipi Stadium; Attendance: 500; Referee: Klodian Shahini

13 December 2017 Second leg	Skënderbeu	3–1 (4–1 agg.)	Besëlidhja	Kavajë
13:00 CET	Kelmendi 3'; Demte 74'; Adeniyi 82'; Lulaj (yellow card) 86'	Report	Ndreca (yellow card) 18'; Camara 27'; Ajazi (red card) 63'	Stadium: Besa Stadium; Attendance: 100; Referee: Kreshnik Cjapi

==== Quarter-finals ====
31 January 2018 First leg	Teuta	0−2	Skënderbeu	Durrës
14:00 CET	Çyrbja (yellow card) 38'; Hila (yellow card) 88'	Report	James 35', 79'	Stadium: Niko Dovana Stadium; Attendance: 800; Referee: Adrian Beqiri

14 February 2018 Second leg	Skënderbeu	3−0 (5–0 agg.)	Teuta	Korçë
17:00 CET	Lilaj 44'; Sowe 60', 71'	Report	Bilali (yellow card) 39'; Beqja (yellow card) 81'	Stadium: Skënderbeu Stadium; Attendance: 200; Referee: Orlando Kuka

==== Semi-finals ====
4 April 2018 First leg	Skënderbeu	0−1	Flamurtari	Korçë
17:00 CET	Nimaga (yellow card) 59'; Dita (yellow card) 67'	Report	Nedeljković (yellow card) 31'; Danilo Alves 83' (yellow card) 85'	Stadium: Skënderbeu Stadium; Attendance: 2,000; Referee: Enea Jorgji

18 April 2018 Second leg	Flamurtari	0−2 (1–2 agg.)	Skënderbeu	Vlorë
18:30 CET	Zuka (yellow card) 27'	Report	Osmani (yellow card) 36'; Sowe 60'; Nimaga 62'; Vangjeli (yellow card) 86'	Stadium: Flamurtari Stadium; Attendance: 3,500; Referee: Laver Alla

==== Final ====
27 May 2018 Final	Skënderbeu	1–0	Laçi	Elbasan
19:00 CET	Osmani (yellow card) 25'; Radaš (yellow card) 58' (yellow-red card) 90'; Lilaj 68' (pen.); Vangjeli (yellow card) 80'	Report	Lushkja (yellow card) 45'; Uzuni (yellow card) 45+1'; Fangaj (yellow card) 50'; Sefgjinaj (yellow card) 67'	Stadium: Elbasan Arena; Attendance: 3,000; Referee: Eldorjan Hamiti

=== UEFA Europa League ===
==== First qualifying round ====
29 June 2017 First leg	Skënderbeu (Albania)	1–0	(Andorra) Sant Julià	Korçë
20:00 CET	Latifi 69'	Report	Luis Blanco (yellow card) 31'; Fabio Alves (yellow card) 53'; José Villanueva (yellow card) 67'; Leonel Alves (yellow card) 90+1'	Stadium: Skënderbeu Stadium; Attendance: 2,700; Referee: Robert Hennessy (Republic of Ireland)

6 July 2017 Second leg	Sant Julià (Andorra)	0–5 (0–6 agg.)	(Albania) Skënderbeu	Andorra la Vella
20:30 CET	Firpo (yellow card) 41'; Luis Blanco (yellow card) 52'	Report	Vujović 2' (yellow card) 41'; Adeniyi 37'; Latifi 79', 90+3'; Vangjeli 90+1'	Stadium: Estadi Comunal; Attendance: 700; Referee: Kai Erik Steen (Norway)

==== Second qualifying round ====
13 July 2017 First leg	Kairat (Kazakhstan)	1–1	(Albania) Skënderbeu	Almaty
17:45 CET	Gohou 9'; Isael (yellow card) 45+2'; Bakayev (yellow card) 50'; Akhmetov (yellow card) 90+3'	Report	Radaš (yellow card) 50'; Mici (yellow card) 63'; Nimaga 72'; Vangjeli (yellow card) 76'	Stadium: Central Stadium; Attendance: 7,054; Referee: Leontios Trattou (Cyprus)

20 July 2017 Second leg	Skënderbeu (Albania)	2–0 (3–1 agg.)	(Kazakhstan) Kairat	Korçë
17:45 CET	Lilaj (yellow card) 28' (yellow-red card) 75' (goal) 50'; Plaku 83'	Report	Elek (yellow card) 59'; César Arzo (red card) 86'; Kuat (yellow card) 90'	Stadium: Skënderbeu Stadium; Attendance: 4,800; Referee: Jens Maae (Denmark)

==== Third qualifying round ====
27 July 2017 First leg	Mladá Boleslav (Czech Republic)	2–1	(Albania) Skënderbeu	Mladá Boleslav
18:00 CET	Chramosta 42'; Jánoš 87'	Report	Nimaga (yellow card) 45+1'; Plaku (yellow card) 63'; Radaš (yellow card) 71'; Čmovš 86' (o.g.)	Stadium: Městský stadion Attendance: 4,487; Referee: Alan Mario Sant (Malta)

3 August 2017 Second leg	Skënderbeu (Albania)	2–1 (a.e.t.) (4–2 p)	(Czech Republic) Mladá Boleslav	Elbasan
20:00 CET	Vangjeli (yellow card) 12'; Lilaj 55' (pen.); Plaku 83'	Report	Jánoš 18'; Komlichenko (yellow card) 53'; Mareš (yellow card) 74'; Přikryl (yellow card) 81'	Stadium: Elbasan Arena; Attendance: 4,850; Referee: Serhiy Boyko (Ukraine)
	Penalties
	Shehi (penalty scored); Latifi (penalty scored); Muzaku (penalty scored); Lilaj (penalty scored)		(penalty scored) Mareš; (penalty scored) Přikryl; (penalty missed) Rada; (penalty missed) Mebrahtu

==== Play-off round ====
17 August 2017 First leg	Dinamo Zagreb (Croatia)	1–1	(Albania) Skënderbeu	Zagreb
18:00 CET	Gojak (yellow card) 13'; Stojanović (yellow card) 35'; Henríquez 90+4'	Report	Latifi 37'; Osmani (yellow card) 45+3'; Nimaga (yellow card) 49'	Stadium: Stadion Maksimir; Attendance: 9,369; Referee: Andris Treimanis (Latvia)

24 August 2017 Second leg	Skënderbeu (Albania)	0–0 (1a–1 agg.)	(Croatia) Dinamo Zagreb	Elbasan
19:00 CET	Nimaga (yellow card) 27' (yellow-red card) 78'; Radaš (yellow card) 78'; Osmani (yellow card) 80'; Mici (yellow card) 81'; Shehi (yellow card) 84'	Report	Sigali (yellow card) 43'; Fernándes (yellow card) 81'	Stadium: Elbasan Arena; Attendance: 11,230; Referee: István Vad (Hungary)

==== Group stage ====
Pos	Team	Pld	W	D	L	GF	GA	GD	Pts	Qualification	DKV	PAR	YB	SKE
1	(Ukraine) Dynamo Kyiv	6	4	1	1	15	9	+6	13	Advance to knockout phase	—	4–1	2–2	3–1
2	(Serbia) Partizan	6	2	2	2	8	9	−1	8	Advance to knockout phase	2–3	—	2–1	2–0
3	(Switzerland) Young Boys	6	1	3	2	7	8	−1	6		0–1	1–1	—	2–1
4	(Albania) Skënderbeu	6	1	2	3	6	10	−4	5		3–2	0–0	1–1	—

Source: UEFA
Rules for classification: Group stage tiebreakers

14 September 2017 1	Dynamo Kyiv (Ukraine)	3–1	(Albania) Skënderbeu	Kyiv
19:00 CET	González (yellow card) 23'; Sydorchuk 47'; Júnior Moraes 50'; Mbokani 65' (pen.); Buyalskyi (yellow card) 72'	Report	Muzaka 39' (yellow card) 41'; Vangjeli (yellow card) 57'; Mici (yellow card) 64'; Radaš (yellow card) 89'	Stadium: NSC Olimpiyskiy Stadium; Attendance: 24,893; Referee: Bart Vertenten (Belgium)

28 September 2017 2	Skënderbeu (Albania)	1–1	(Switzerland) Young Boys	Elbasan
21:05 CET	Sowe 65'; Nimaga (yellow card) 86'	Report	Assalé (yellow card) 30' (goal) 72'	Stadium: Elbasan Arena; Attendance: 3,300; Referee: Kevin Blom (Netherlands)

19 October 2017 3	Skënderbeu (Albania)	0–0	(Serbia) Partizan	Elbasan
21:05 CET	Lilaj (yellow card) 38'; Jashanica (yellow card) 60'; Mici (yellow card) 90+3'	Report	Tawamba (yellow card) 34'; Miletić (yellow card) 62'; Tošić (yellow card) 90+3'	Stadium: Elbasan Arena; Attendance: 6,300; Referee: Daniel Stefański (Poland)

2 November 2017 4	Partizan (Serbia)	2–0	(Albania) Skënderbeu	Belgrade
19:00 CET	Tošić 39' (yellow card) 52'; Jevtović (yellow card) 43'; Tawamba 66'; Miletić (yellow card) 71'	Report	Jashanica (yellow card) 65'	Stadium: Partizan Stadium; Attendance: 12,659; Referee: Carlos del Cerro Grande (Spain)

23 November 2017 5	Skënderbeu (Albania)	3–2	(Ukraine) Dynamo Kyiv	Elbasan
21:05 CET	Lilaj 18'; Adeniyi 52' (yellow card) 90+3'; Sowe 56'; Radaš (yellow card) 77'	Report	Tsyhankov 16'; Rusyn 90+1'; Buschan (yellow card) 90+3'	Stadium: Elbasan Arena; Attendance: 100 (Note: The Skënderbeu Korçë v Dynamo Kyiv match was played behind closed doors due to punishment by UEFA.); Referee: Oliver Drachta (Austria)

7 December 2017 6	Young Boys (Switzerland)	2–1	(Albania) Skënderbeu	Bern
19:00 CET	Ngamaleu (yellow card) 4'; Joss (yellow card) 16'; Hoarau 55' (yellow card) 73'; Assalé 90+5'; Schick (yellow card) 90+7'	Report	Aliti (yellow card) 32'; Gavazaj 51'; Beneyam (yellow card) 66'; Mici (yellow card) 89'; Nimaga (yellow card) 90+5'	Stadium: Stade de Suisse; Attendance: 8,209; Referee: Simon Lee Evans (Wales)
