= 2017–18 Albanian Cup =

Kupa e Shqipërisë

Tournament details
- Country: Albania
- Teams: 34

Final positions
- Champions: Skënderbeu
- Runners-up: Laçi

Tournament statistics
- Matches played: 63
- Goals scored: 188 (2.98 per match)
- Top goal scorer(s): Redon Xhixha; Sindrit Guri (7 goals)

2017–18 Albanian Cup (Albanian: Kupa e Shqipërisë) was the sixty-sixth season of Albania's annual cup competition. Tirana are the defending champions. Skënderbeu won the title for the first time in their history.

Ties are played in a two-legged format similar to those of European competitions. If the aggregate score is tied after both games, the team with the higher number of away goals advances. If the number of away goals is equal in both games, the match is decided by extra time and a penalty shoot-out, if necessary.

== Preliminary round ==
In order to reduce the number of participating teams for the first round to 32, a preliminary tournament is played. In contrast to the main tournament, the preliminary tournament is held as a single-leg knock-out competition. Matches were played on 6 September 2017 and involved the four best teams from Albanian Second Division.

| Team 1 | Score | Team 2 |
|---|---|---|
| Egnatia (II) | 3−1 (a.e.t.) | Vora (III) |
| Naftëtari (II) | 3–2 | Oriku (III) |

== First round ==
All 28 teams of the 2017–18 Superliga and First Division entered in this round along with the two qualifiers from the preliminary round. The first legs were played on 13 September 2017 and the second legs took place on 27 September 2017.

| Team 1 | Agg. | Team 2 | 1st leg | 2nd leg |
|---|---|---|---|---|
| Egnatia (II) | 1–4 | Kukësi (I) | 1−0 | 0–4 |
| Naftëtari (II) | 2–13 | Partizani (I) | 2−6 | 0–7 |
| Adriatiku (III) | 1−17 | Skënderbeu (I) | 0–8 | 1−9 |
| Elbasani (III) | 0−6 | Luftëtari (I) | 0−3 | 0−3 |
| Tërbuni (II) | 1−2 | Teuta (I) | 1−0 | 0−2 |
| Sopoti (III) | 0–15 | Laçi (I) | 0−12 | 0–3 |
| Kastrioti (II) | 0−4 | Vllaznia (I) | 0−0 | 0−4 |
| Dinamo Tirana (II) | 1−6 | Flamurtari (I) | 0−2 | 1−4 |
| Besa (II) | 1−4 | Tirana (II) | 1−2 | 0−2 |
| Turbina (II) | 4−3 | Korabi (II) | 3−2 | 1−1 |
| Iliria (II) | 1−7 | Kamza (I) | 0−2 | 1−5 |
| Apolonia (II) | 2−2 (1−3 p) | Lushnja (I) | 1−1 | 1−1 (a.e.t.) |
| Shënkolli (II) | 0−3 | Besëlidhja (II) | 0−2 | 0−1 |
| Tomori (II) | 2−4 | Bylis (II) | 0−3 | 2−1 |
| Burreli (II) | 2−2 (a) | Erzeni (II) | 2−1 | 0−1 |
| Shkumbini (II) | 1−3 | Pogradeci (II) | 0−2 | 1−1 |

| 13 September 2017 | Egnatia | 1−0 | Kukësi | Egnatia Stadium, Rrogozhinë |
| 16:00 CEST | Bakiasi 17' | | | Referee: Eraldo Demiraj |

| 27 September 2017 | Kukësi | 4–0 | Egnatia | Internacional Complex, Pezë Helmës |
| 14:00 CEST | Guri 18', 51'; Krkotić 24'; Calé 33' | | | Referee: Klodian Shahini |

Kukësi advanced to the second round.

| 13 September 2017 | Naftëtari | 2−6 | Partizani | Bashkim Sulejmani Stadium, Kuçovë |
| 16:00 CEST | Nallbati 12'; Kajo 80' | | Djidjiwa 19', 72'; Malota 44'; Çani 59'; Herrera 65'; Batha 86' (pen.) | Referee: Klodian Shahini |

| 27 September 2017 | Partizani | 7−0 | Naftëtari | National Sports Centre, Kamëz |
| 13:00 CEST | Djidjiwa 4'; Bardhi 45', 89'; Basrak 50'; Herrera 67'; Adorján 74'; Shahinas 79' | | | Referee: Erjon Bastari |

Partizani advanced to the second round.

| 6 September 2017 | Adriatiku | 0−8 | Skënderbeu | Skënderbeu Stadium, Korçë |
| 16:00 CEST | | | Kelmendi 17'; Muzaka 37', 53' (pen.); Shkodra 63'; Nešpor 77'; Demte 79'; Sowe 80', 86' | Referee: Eraldo Demiraj |

| 5 October 2017 | Skënderbeu | 9−1 | Adriatiku | Skënderbeu Stadium, Korçë |
| 14:00 CEST | Nešpor 4', 17'; Shkodra 7'; Mara 11', 25'; Gripshi 38'; Liqeri 65'; Lulaj 68'; Taku 86' | | Trungshi 71' (pen.) | Referee: Xhulio Mema |

KF Skënderbeu advanced to the second round.

| 13 September 2017 | Elbasani | 0−3 | Luftëtari | Elbasan Arena, Elbasan |
| 16:00 CEST | | | Janku 39'; Zogaj 43'; Núñez 83' | Referee: Erjon Bastari |

| 27 September 2017 | Luftëtari | 3−0 | Elbasani | Gjirokastra Stadium, Gjirokastër |
| 15:30 CEST | Núñez 20' (pen.); Facundo 33'; Zijai 77' | | | Referee: Altin Stefi |

Luftëtari advanced to the second round.

| 13 September 2017 | Tërbuni | 1−0 | Teuta | Ismail Xhemali Stadium, Pukë |
| 16:00 CEST | Shaba 34' | | | Referee: Klodjan Prenga |

| 27 September 2017 | Teuta | 2−0 | Tërbuni | Niko Dovana Stadium, Durrës |
| 15:30 CEST | Latif 79'; Lena 83' (pen.) | | | Referee: Edvaldo Durmishi |

Teuta advanced to the second round.

| 13 September 2017 | Sopoti | 0−12 | Laçi | National Sports Centre, Kamëz |
| 13:00 CEST | | | Bushi 16'; Uzuni 26'; Mbombo 28', 65'; Lushkja 47'; Shala 49'; Xhixha 52', 57', 82' (pen.), 85', 89'; Fangaj 87' | Referee: Labian Mustafaraj |

| 27 September 2017 | Laçi | 3−0; Awarded | Sopoti |
| 15:30 CEST |

Laçi advanced to the second round.

| 13 September 2017 | Kastrioti | 0−0 | Vllaznia | Kastrioti Stadium, Krujë |
| 16:00 CEST | | | | Referee: Albano Stolaj |

| 27 September 2017 | Vllaznia | 4−0 | Kastrioti | Reshit Rusi Stadium, Shkodër |
| 15:30 CEST | Tafili 11'; Ribaj 30'; Borshi 60' (o.g.); Vucaj 75' | | | Referee: Edvin Hoxha |

Vllaznia advanced to the second round.

| 13 September 2017 | Dinamo Tirana | 0−2 | Flamurtari | Internacional Complex, Pezë Helmës |
| 16:00 CEST | | | Hoxhaj 50'; Musta 67' | Referee: Besnard Kaimi |

| 27 September 2017 | Flamurtari | 4−1 | Dinamo Tirana | Pylli i Sodës, Vlorë |
| 15:30 CEST | Deliaj 13'; Juffo 22' (pen.); Toungara 47' (pen.); Hyseni 76' | | Hasa 21' | Referee: Alvi Paco |

Flamurtari advanced to the second round.

| 13 September 2017 | Besa | 1−2 | Tirana | Besa Stadium, Kavajë |
| 16:00 CEST | Perja 29' | | Karabeci 31' (pen.), 67' | Referee: Olsion Yzeiraj |

| 27 September 2017 | Tirana | 2−0 | Besa | Skënder Halili Complex, Tirana |
| 15:30 CEST | Ngoo 9', 13' | | | Referee: Hermal Llapra |

Tirana advanced to the second round.

| 13 September 2017 | Turbina | 3−2 | Korabi | National Sports Centre, Kamëz |
| 16:00 CEST | Bakiu 29'; Gërxho 36'; Peqini 55' | | Hyseni 4'; Murrja 20' | Referee: Edvin Hoxha |

| 27 September 2017 | Korabi | 1−1 | Turbina | Korabi Stadium, Peshkopi |
| 15:30 CEST | Murrja 21' | | Roshi 76' | Referee: Klodjan Prenga |

Turbina advanced to the second round.

| 13 September 2017 | Iliria | 0−2 | Kamza | Redi Maloku Stadium, Fushë-Krujë |
| 16:00 CEST | | | Račić 25'; Plaku 57' | Referee: Roxhers Muska |

| 28 September 2017 | Kamza | 5−1 | Iliria | National Sports Centre, Kamëz |
| 13:00 CEST | Mehmeti 28'; Frashëri 37'; Mumajesi 40'; Rezi 45', 52' | | Ikonomi 42' | Referee: Arlind Pirani |

Kamza advanced to the second round.

| 13 September 2017 | Apolonia | 1−1 | Lushnja | Loni Papuçiu Stadium, Fier |
| 16:00 CEST | Krasniqi 82' (pen.) | | Pepa 12' | Referee: Hermal Llapra |

| 27 September 2017 | Lushnja | 1−1 (a.e.t.) (3−1 p) | Apolonia |
| 15:30 CEST | Bufasi 27' | | Krasniqi 57' | Referee: Mikele Dyrmishi |
| | Penalties |
| | Gava (penalty missed); Magani (penalty missed); Alushi (penalty scored); Pepa (penalty scored); Meto (penalty scored) | | (penalty missed) Krasniqi; (penalty missed) Troka; (penalty missed) Broshka; (penalty scored) Çako |

Lushnja advanced to the second round.

| 13 September 2017 | Shënkolli | 0−2 | Besëlidhja | Shënkoll Stadium, Shënkoll |
| 16:00 CEST | | | Dyca 56' | Referee: Bekris Dragusha |

| 27 September 2017 | Besëlidhja | 1−0 | Shënkolli | Brian Filipi Stadium, Lezhë |
| 15:30 CEST | Bangura 43' | | | Referee: Amarildo Gjeci |

Besëlidhja advanced to the second round.

| 13 September 2017 | Tomori | 0−3; Awarded | Bylis | Skrapar Sports Field, Çorovodë |
| 16:00 CEST | | | | Referee: Granit Sulko |

| 27 September 2017 | Bylis | 1−2 | Tomori | Adush Muça Stadium, Ballsh |
| 15:30 CEST | Buzi 35' | | Onuh 52'; Hyseni 75' | Referee: Elidon Halo |

Bylis advanced to the second round.

| 13 September 2017 | Burreli | 2−1 | Erzeni | Liri Ballabani Stadium, Burrel |
| 16:00 CEST | Kaloshi 49'; Farruku 77' | | Vathi 75' | Referee: Amarildo Gjeci |

| 27 September 2017 | Erzeni | 1−0 | Burreli | Tofik Jashari Stadium, Shijak |
| 15:30 CEST | Pasha 63' (pen.) | | | Referee: Endrit Zhuli |

Erzeni advanced to the second round.

| 13 September 2017 | Shkumbini | 0−2 | Pogradeci | Shkumbini Stadium, Peqin |
| 16:00 CEST | | | Çekiçi 5'; Kame 77' | Referee: Alvi Paco |

| 27 September 2017 | Pogradeci | 1−1 | Shkumbini | Gjorgji Kyçyku Stadium, Pogradec |
| 15:30 CEST | Dragoj 90' | | Nexha 28' | Referee: Geisi Velcani |

Pogradeci advanced to the second round.

== Second round ==
All the 16 qualified teams from the first round progressed to the second round. The first legs were played on 29 November 2017 and the second legs took place on 13 December 2017.

| Team 1 | Agg. | Team 2 | 1st leg | 2nd leg |
|---|---|---|---|---|
| Erzeni (II) | 2−9 | Kukësi (I) | 1−4 | 1−5 |
| Besëlidhja (II) | 1−4 | Skënderbeu (I) | 0−1 | 1−3 |
| Kamza (I) | 1−5 | Teuta (I) | 1−1 | 0−4 |
| Tirana (II) | 2−1 | Vllaznia (I) | 2−0 | 0−1 |
| Pogradeci (II) | 0−4 | Partizani (I) | 0–1 | 0−3 |
| Bylis (II) | 2−4 | Luftëtari (I) | 2−1 | 0−3 |
| Lushnja (I) | 2−3 | Laçi (I) | 1−3 | 1−0 |
| Turbina (II) | 3−11 | Flamurtari (I) | 1−6 | 2−5 |

| 29 November 2017 | Erzeni | 1−4 | Kukësi | Tofik Jashari Stadium, Shijak |
| 14:00 CET | Goxha 87' | | Guri 9', 14'; Koldashi 51'; Peposhi 88' | Referee: Olsid Ferataj |

| 13 December 2017 | Kukësi | 5−1 | Erzeni | Internacional Complex, Pezë Helmës |
| 13:00 CET | Koldashi 12', 25'; Ethemi 38'; Aliyev 56'; Shtubina 63' | | Troplini 69' | Referee: Orlando Kuka |

Kukësi advanced to the quarter finals.

| 29 November 2017 | Besëlidhja | 0−1 | Skënderbeu | Brian Filipi Stadium, Lezhë |
| 14:00 CET | | | Kelmendi 30' | Referee: Klodian Shahini |

| 13 December 2017 | Skënderbeu | 3−1 | Besëlidhja | Besa Stadium, Kavajë |
| 13:00 CET | Kelmendi 3', 84'; Demte 74' | | Tourad 27' | Referee: Kreshnik Cjapi |

Skënderbeu advanced to the quarter finals.

| 29 November 2017 | Kamza | 1−1 | Teuta | Kamëz Stadium, Kamëz |
| 14:00 CET | Rezi 1' | | Latif 30' | Referee: Juxhin Xhaja |

| 13 December 2017 | Teuta | 4−0 | Kamza | Niko Dovana Stadium, Durrës |
| 13:00 CET | Hila 33' (pen.), 70'; Beqaj 84'; Osemene 90' | | | Referee: Ardian Beqiri |

Teuta advanced to the quarter finals.

| 29 November 2017 | Tirana | 2−0 | Vllaznia | Selman Stërmasi Stadium, Tirana |
| 18:00 CET | Greca 68'; Oliveira 83' | | | Referee: Laver Alla |

| 13 December 2017 | Vllaznia | 1−0 | Tirana | Loro Boriçi Stadium, Shkodër |
| 13:00 CET | Kalaja 59' | | | Referee: Enea Jorgji |

Tirana advanced to the quarter finals.

| 30 November 2017 | Pogradeci | 0−1 | Partizani | Gjorgji Kyçyku Stadium, Pogradec |
| 14:00 CET | | | Sukaj 85' | Referee: Emirion Sino |

| 13 December 2017 | Partizani | 3−0 | Pogradeci | Kamëz Stadium, Kamëz |
| 13:00 CET | Fili 57'; Progni 70'; Batha 78' | | | Referee: Fatjon Xhemalaj |

Partizani advanced to the quarter finals.

| 29 November 2017 | Bylis | 2−1 | Luftëtari | Adush Muça Stadium, Ballsh |
| 14:00 CET | Kolgega 14'; Murataj 22' | | Pergjini 84' | Referee: Fatjon Xhemalaj |

| 13 December 2017 | Luftëtari | 3−0; Awarded | Bylis | Gjirokastra Stadium, Gjirokastër |
| 13:00 CET |

Luftëtari advanced to the quarter finals.

| 29 November 2017 | Lushnja | 1−3 | Laçi | Abdurrahman Roza Haxhiu Stadium, Lushnjë |
| 14:00 CET | Pepa 69' | | Xhixha 26', 30'; Bushi 67' | Referee: Enea Jorgji |

| 13 December 2017 | Laçi | 0−1 | Lushnja | Laçi Stadium, Laç |
| 13:00 CET | | | Bizhyti 79' | Referee: Indrit Myrtja |

Laçi advanced to the quarter finals.

| 29 November 2017 | Turbina | 1−6 | Flamurtari | Nexhip Trungu Stadium, Cërrik |
| 14:00 CET | Dollani 61' | | Liçaj 18' (pen.); Camara 30'; Toungara 39', 85'; Hyseni 73'; Hoxhaj 83' (pen.) | Referee: Orlando Kuka |

| 13 December 2017 | Flamurtari | 5−2 | Turbina | Petro Ruci Stadium, Orikum |
| 13:00 CET | Toungara 25'; Liçaj 32' (pen.); Diamanti 59'; Tushi 69'; Muçollari 74' | | Sallaku 42', 90' | Referee: Eraldo Demiraj |

Flamurtari advanced to the quarter finals.

== Quarter-finals ==
All eight qualified teams from the second round progressed to the quarter-finals. The first legs were played on 31 January 2018 and the second legs took place on 14 February 2018.

| Team 1 | Agg. | Team 2 | 1st leg | 2nd leg |
|---|---|---|---|---|
| Tirana (II) | 1–2 | Kukësi (I) | 1–1 | 0–1 |
| Teuta (I) | 0–5 | Skënderbeu (I) | 0−2 | 0–3 |
| Flamurtari (I) | 2–2 (a) | Partizani (I) | 1–0 | 1–2 |
| Laçi (I) | 4–0 | Luftëtari (I) | 3−0 | 1–0 |

| 31 January 2018 | Tirana | 1−1 | Kukësi | Selman Stërmasi Stadium, Tirana |
| 17:00 CET | Sentamu 40' | | Guri 87' | Referee: Klajdi Koka |

| 14 February 2018 | Kukësi | 1−0 | Tirana | Zeqir Ymeri Stadium, Kukës |
| 13:00 CET | Guri 5' | | | Referee: Juxhin Xhaja |

Kukësi advanced to the semi finals.

| 31 January 2018 | Teuta | 0−2 | Skënderbeu | Niko Dovana Stadium, Durrës |
| 14:00 CET | | | James 35', 79' | Referee: Ardian Beqiri |

| 14 February 2018 | Skënderbeu | 3−0 | Teuta | Skënderbeu Stadium, Korçë |
| 17:00 CET | Lilaj 44'; Sowe 60', 71' | | | Referee: Orlando Kuka |

Skënderbeu advanced to the semi finals.

| 31 January 2018 | Flamurtari | 1−0 | Partizani | Flamurtari Stadium, Vlorë |
| 17:00 CET | Alves 72' | | | Referee: Kridens Meta |

| 14 February 2018 | Partizani | 2−1 | Flamurtari | Selman Stërmasi Stadium, Tirana |
| 17:00 CET | Trashi 38'; Asani 79' | | Sidibe 11' | Referee: Emirion Sino |

Flamurtari advanced to the semi finals.

| 31 January 2018 | Laçi | 3−0 | Luftëtari | Laçi Stadium, Laç |
| 14:00 CET | Nika 23'; Reginaldo 30'; Qaqi 79' | | | Referee: Olsi Sokoli |

| 14 February 2018 | Luftëtari | 0−1 | Laçi | Gjirokastra Stadium, Gjirokastër |
| 13:00 CET | | | Reginaldo 51' | Referee: Klodian Shahini |

Laçi advanced to the semi finals.

== Semi-finals ==
The first legs were played on 4 April and the second legs were played on 18 April 2018.

| Team 1 | Agg. | Team 2 | 1st leg | 2nd leg |
|---|---|---|---|---|
| Laçi (I) | 1–1 (a) | Kukësi (I) | 0−0 | 1−1 |
| Skënderbeu (I) | 2−1 | Flamurtari (I) | 0−1 | 2−0 |

| 4 April 2018 | Laçi | 0−0 | Kukësi | Laçi Stadium, Laç |
| 14:00 CEST | | | | Referee: Andi Koçi |

| 18 April 2018 | Kukësi | 1−1 | Laçi | Zeqir Ymeri Stadium, Kukës |
| 15:30 CEST | Guri 20' (pen.) | | Reginaldo 78' | Referee: Eldorjan Hamiti |

Laçi advanced to the final.

| 4 April 2018 | Skënderbeu | 0−1 | Flamurtari | Skënderbeu Stadium, Korçë |
| 17:00 CEST | | | Alves 83' | Referee: Enea Jorgji |

| 18 April 2018 | Flamurtari | 0−2 | Skënderbeu | Flamurtari Stadium, Vlorë |
| 18:30 CEST | | | Sowe 60'; Nimaga 62' | Referee: Laver Alla |

Skënderbeu advanced to the final.

== Final ==
27 May 2018
19:00

| Skënderbeu | 1–0 | Laçi |
|---|---|---|
| Lilaj 68' (pen.) |

Elbasan Arena, Elbasan
Attendance: 3,000
Referee: Eldorjan Hamiti
