= Ded Bushi =

Albanian footballer

Personal information
- Date of birth: 2 October 1998 (age 28)
- Place of birth: Laç, Albania
- Position: Midfielder

Team information
- Current team: Shënkolli

Youth career
- 2012–2016: Brians
- 2016–2019: Laçi
- 2016: → Brians (loan)

Senior career*
Years	Team	Apps	(Gls)
2016–2019	Laçi	19	(0)
2019–2022	Besëlidhja	52	(5)
2022–	Shënkolli		

International career^{‡}
2017	Albania U20	1	(0)
- * Club domestic league appearances and goals as of 16 April 2022 ‡ National team caps and goals as of 14 November 2017

Ded Bushi (born 2 October 1998) is an Albanian professional footballer who plays as a midfielder for Albanian club Shënkolli .

== Club career ==
=== Laçi ===
Bushi was first included in the senior squad in May 2016 where he was in the team for the league fixture versus Skënderbeu Korçë. He made his professional debut by playing in the first 37 minutes of the match before making space for Endri Muçmata in an overwhelming 6–1 away loss. This was his only appearance of the 2015–16 season.

He played only twice in the following season, featuring twice as a substitute in the league matches versus Teuta Durrës and Korabi Peshkopi.

Bushi found more space to play in the 2017–18 season where he amassed 12 league appearances, collecting 359 minutes as Laçi finished in 4th position which returned them to UEFA Europa League after three years. He scored his first senior goal in the 12–0 crushing win of Laçi versus Sopoti Librazhd in the first round of 2017–18 Albanian Cup. He was on target again in this competition, scoring the third of a 3–1 win at Lushnja in the first leg of second round. Laçi eventually made their way to the final, where they were defeated 1–0 by Skënderbeu Korçë via a controversial penalty of Sabien Lilaj, with Bushi remaining on bench.

In July 2018, new manager Besnik Prenga included him in the team for the 2018–19 UEFA Europa League campaign. He made his debut in the competition on 19 July by entering in the final 10 minutes of the second leg match versus Anorthosis Famagusta with Laçi winning 1–0 and progressing to the next round on away goal rule after losing the first leg.

== International career ==
Bushi burst on to the international scene in 2017 where he was called up by Alban Bushi of the Albania under-20 side for the friendly match against Georgia. He entered as a substitute in the 65th minute for Agon Mucolli in an eventual 3–0 loss.

== Career statistics ==
As of 23 July 2018

Club statistics
Club	Season	League			Cup		Europe		Other		Total	
Club	Season	Division	Apps	Goals	Apps	Goals	Apps	Goals	Apps	Goals	Apps	Goals
Laçi	2015–16	Albanian Superliga	1	0	—		—		—		1	0
Laçi	2016–17	Albanian Superliga	2	0	—		—		—		2	0
Laçi	2017–18	Albanian Superliga	12	0	3	2	—		—		15	2
Laçi	2018–19	Albanian Superliga	0	0	0	0	1 (Note: All appearance(s) in UEFA Europa League)	0	—		1	0
Laçi	Total		15	0	3	2	1	0	—		19	2
Career total			15	0	3	2	1	0	—		19	2
