= Blerim Krasniqi =

Albanian footballer

Personal information
- Date of birth: 5 July 1996 (age 30)
- Place of birth: Kavajë, Albania
- Height: 1.87 m (6 ft 2 in)
- Position: Forward

Team information
- Current team: Drita
- Number: 19

Youth career
- 2010–2014: Besa

Senior career*
Years	Team	Apps	(Gls)
2013–2015	Besa	14	(1)
2015–2017	Apolonia	55	(23)
2018–2020	Skënderbeu	70	(15)
2020–2021	Teuta	34	(4)
2021–2022	Gjilani	35	(8)
2022–2023	Mioveni	23	(2)
2023–	Drita	94	(22)

International career
2013–2015	Albania U19	4	(2)
- * Club domestic league appearances and goals as of 4 November 2026

Blerim Krasniqi (born 5 July 1996) is an Albanian professional footballer who plays as a forward for ALBI MALL Superleague club Drita.

== Club career ==
=== Besa ===
Krasniqi was born into a Kosovo Albanian family that had settled in his hometown of Kavajë, which is where he started his football career at the youth team of local club Besa at the age of 14 in 2010. He made his senior league debut for the club on 11 May 2013 in a 1–1 away draw with Bylis, entering in the final 15 minutes in place of Didmar Duro. He scored his first league goal for the club on 1 November 2014 in a 3–1 away loss to Iliria. His goal, the first of the match, came in the 16th minute.

=== Apolonia ===
On 3 September 2015, Krasniqi moved to Kategoria e Parë club Apolonia by signing for an undisclosed fee. He made his league debut for the club nine days later in a 3–2 home loss against KS Pogradeci. He scored his first league goal for the club on 17 October 2015 versus Elbasani, netting the temporally equalizer in 70th minute in an eventual 2–1 home win.

=== Skënderbeu ===
With 6 months remained in his contract with Apolonia, Krasniqi signed a pre-contract with Skënderbeu to join the club in Summer transfers window. Later on, the Skënderbeu's coach Ilir Daja was looking forward for a striker to compete with Ali Sowe and convinced the club to approach him for the winter transfers window. On 8 January 2018 Krasniqi gave the club last goodbye to join Skënderbeu the following day. Skënderbeu paid €15,000 to Apolonia and both clubs agreed that the later would keep 20% of his card. Then the following day Krasniqi went to Antalya, Turkey where the club was in preparatory stage and signed a 3.5 year contract.

Krasniqi made his league debut for the club on 26 January 2018 in a 2–0 away loss to Luftëtari. He was subbed on for Emiljano Vila in the 85th minute. His first score-sheet contribution came later on 4 March during the 4–0 home win over Laçi, with Krasniqi scoring the fourth of the match in 84th minute, just eight minutes after he had been subbed on.

He played 9 league appearances during the second part of 2017–18 season as Skënderbeu won the championship for the 7th time in the last 8 seasons, marking Krasniqi's first silverware. In 2017–18 Albanian Cup, he made 3 appearances as substitute, but did not play in the final, in which the team won 1–0 to Laçi for their first ever trophy. The success also meant that Skënderbeu had completed the domestic double for the first time in history.

Krasniqi was projected as a starter in the lineup by the newly appointed manager Orges Shehi ahead of 2018–19 season following the departure of Ali Sowe. He began the season by playing full-90 minutes in the 2018 Albanian Supercup match against Laçi, being a constant threat to the opposite defenders as the team won 3–2 at Elbasan Arena. His performance was goodly received by the media. He opened his scoring account for the 2018–19 season on 17 September in the 2–0 win at Flamurtari.

=== Mioveni ===
On 19 August 2022, Krasniqi joined Liga I club Mioveni.

== International career ==
Krasniqi received his first Albania under-21s call up by coach Alban Bushi for a gathering between 14 and 17 May 2017 with most of the players selected from Albanian championship.

== Career statistics ==
=== Club ===
As of 20 May 2023

Club statistics
Club	Season	League			Cup		Europe (Note: Including continental competitions, such as UEFA Champions League, UEFA Europa League, and UEFA Europa Conference League)		Other		Total	
Club	Season	Division	Apps	Goals	Apps	Goals	Apps	Goals	Apps	Goals	Apps	Goals
Besa	2012–13	Kategoria Superiore	1	0	0	0	—		—		1	0
Besa	2013–14	Kategoria Superiore	0	0	2	1	—		—		2	1
Besa	2014–15	Kategoria e Parë	13	1	1	0	—		—		14	1
Besa	Total		14	1	3	1	—		—		17	2
Apolonia	2015–16	Kategoria e Parë	19	4	4	0	—		—		23	4
Apolonia	2016–17	Kategoria e Parë	25	9	3	0	—		—		28	9
Apolonia	2017–18	Kategoria e Parë	11	10	2	2	—		—		13	12
Apolonia	Total		55	23	9	2	—		—		64	25
Skënderbeu	2017–18	Kategoria Superiore	9	1	3	0	—		—		12	1
Skënderbeu	2018–19	Kategoria Superiore	29	6	4	1	—		1 (Note: Appearance in Albanian Supercup)	0	34	7
Skënderbeu	2019–20	Kategoria Superiore	32	8	2	0	—		—		34	8
Skënderbeu	Total		70	15	9	1	—		1	0	80	16
Teuta	2020–21	Kategoria Superiore	34	4	3	0	2	1	1	0	40	5
Teuta	2021–22	Kategoria Superiore	—		—		1	0	—		1	0
Teuta	Total		34	4	3	0	3	1	1	0	41	5
Gjilani	2021–22	Kosovar Superliga	35	8	2	0	—		—		37	8
Gjilani	2022–23	Kosovar Superliga	—		—		2	1	—		2	1
Gjilani	Total		35	8	2	0	2	1	0	0	39	9
Mioveni	2022–23	Liga I	23	2	3	0	—		—		26	2
Career total			231	53	29	4	5	2	2	0	267	59

== Honours ==
Skënderbeu

- Kategoria Superiore: 2017–18
- Albanian Cup: 2017–18
- Albanian Supercup: 2018

Teuta

- Kategoria Superiore: 2020–21
- Albanian Supercup: 2020

Drita

- Kosovo Superleague: 2024–25, 2025–26
- Kosovar Supercup: 2025
