= Suad Sahiti =

Association football player

Personal information
- Full name: Suad Sahiti
- Date of birth: 6 February 1995 (age 31)
- Place of birth: Belgrade, Serbia, FR Yugoslavia
- Height: 1.79 m (5 ft 10 in)
- Position: Right winger

Team information
- Current team: Ferizaj
- Number: 28

Youth career
- 2002–2012: Ramiz Sadiku
- 2012–2013: Marseille
- 2013–2014: Hajvalia

Senior career*
Years	Team	Apps	(Gls)
2014–2017	Rabotnički	57	(7)
2017–2018	Skënderbeu Korçë	13	(0)
2018–2019	AEL	8	(0)
2019	Septemvri Sofia	8	(1)
2019–2020	Wisła Płock	18	(0)
2020–2021	Zrinjski Mostar	5	(0)
2021–2023	Šibenik	38	(2)
2023	Llapi	0	(0)
2023–2024	Shkupi	10	(2)
2024–2025	Feronikeli	11	(1)
2025	Prishtina e Re		
2025–	Ferizaj	1	(0)

International career^{‡}
2017	Kosovo	1	(0)
- * Club domestic league appearances and goals as of 19 February 2026 ‡ National team caps and goals as of 13 November 2017

Suad Sahiti (born 6 February 1995) is a Kosovan professional footballer who plays as a right winger for Kosovo Superleague club Ferizaj.

== Club career ==
=== Early career ===
At the age of seven, Sahiti started playing football in Ramiz Sadiku, where after ten years he moved to Marseille, where he stayed for a year and was close to signing a professional contract which was rejected by his agent. In April 2014, Sahiti after returning to Kosovo and joined Hajvalia, together with his brother Emir was in the test to Belgian team Standard Liège, but unfortunately this test failed even though it was warned that they would sign contract.

=== Rabotnički ===
On 2 September 2014, Sahiti signed a two-year contract with Macedonian First League club Rabotnički. On 5 October 2014, he made his debut in a 1–2 away win against Metalurg Skopje after coming on as a substitute in the 77th minute in place of Marjan Altiparmakovski. On 23 July 2015, Sahiti scored his first goal for Rabotnički in his 18th appearance for the club in a 2–0 home win over the Latvian side Jelgava in 2015–16 UEFA Europa League second qualifying round.

=== Skënderbeu Korçë ===
On 28 August 2017, Sahiti signed a three-year contract with Kategoria Superiore club Skënderbeu Korçë, to replace the departed Liridon Latifi as the second choice. His debut with Skënderbeu Korçë came nine days later in the 2017–18 Albanian Cup first round against Adriatiku Mamurras after being named in the starting line-up.

=== AEL ===
On 3 July 2018, Sahiti signed a three-year contract with Super League Greece club AEL. On 25 August 2018, he made his debut in a 0–1 away win against Apollon Smyrnis after being named in the starting line-up. On 29 January 2019, Sahiti disconnected the contract with AEL due to accumulation of financial arrears against him.

=== Septemvri Sofia ===
On 15 February 2019, Sahiti joined Bulgarian First League side Septemvri Sofia. Ten days later, he made his debut in a 0–0 home draw against Vitosha Bistritsa after coming on as a substitute at 82nd minute in place of Boris Galchev. On 12 April 2019, Sahiti scored his first goal for Septemvri Sofia in his fifth appearance for the club in a 1–0 home win over Lokomotiv Plovdiv in Bulgarian First League.

=== Wisła Płock ===
On 24 July 2019, Sahiti joined Ekstraklasa side Wisła Płock after agreeing to a one-year deal with the option of continuation for another season and received squad number 44. On 18 August 2019, he made his debut in a 1–0 away defeat against Piast Gliwice after coming on as a substitute at 72nd minute in place of Ricardinho.

=== Zrinjski Mostar ===
On 1 October 2020, Sahiti signed a two-year contract with Bosnian Premier League club Zrinjski Mostar. Fifteen days later, he made his debut in a 0–4 away win against Tuzla City after coming on as a substitute at 86th minute in place of Miloš Filipović.

=== Šibenik ===
On 4 March 2021, Sahiti signed a two-year contract with Croatian First League club Šibenik and received squad number 77. He found his brother Emir who was part of Šibenik as loan from Hajduk Split. One day later, he made his debut in a 3–2 away defeat against Istra 1961 after coming on as a substitute at 67th minute in place of Ignacio Bailone.

=== Llapi ===
On 21 February 2023, Sahiti signed a one-and-a-half-year contract with Kosovo Superleague club Llapi, but he failed to debut with the team.

=== Shkupi ===
On 5 July 2023, Sahiti joined Macedonian First League side Shkupi after agreeing to a one-year deal with the option of continuation for another season.

== International career ==
=== Macedonia ===
On 21 March 2016, Sahiti received a call-up from Macedonia U21 for 2017 UEFA European Under-21 Championship qualification matches against Iceland U21 and France U21, but even though he was part of the team he could not play due to problems with documentation, namely the lack of passport. After receiving the passport he was on the plans of the Macedonia national senior team which was led by Igor Angelovski who during time of he was part of Rabotnički, Angelovski was head coach, but there was no official call-up.

=== Kosovo ===
On 8 November 2017, Sahiti switched his allegiance to Kosovo and received the call-up for the friendly match against Latvia, and made his debut after coming on as a substitute at 75th minute in place of Milot Rashica.

== Personal life ==
Sahiti was born in Belgrade, FR Yugoslavia to Albanian parents from Medveđa, and is the older brother of Kosovo international Emir Sahiti. He holds Kosovan, Macedonian, and Albanian passports.

== Career statistics ==
=== Club ===
As of 5 March 2021

Club	Season	League			Cup		Continental		Total	
Club	Season	Division	Apps	Goals	Apps	Goals	Apps	Goals	Apps	Goals
Rabotnički	2014–15	Macedonian First League	14	0	2	0	—		16	0
Rabotnički	2015–16	Macedonian First League	19	0	4	0	7	1	30	1
Rabotnički	2016–17	Macedonian First League	22	7	0	0	2	0	24	7
Rabotnički	2017–18	Macedonian First League	2	0	0	0	4	1	6	1
Rabotnički	Total		57	7	6	0	13	2	76	9
Skënderbeu Korçë	2017–18	Kategoria Superiore	13	0	3	0	4	0	20	0
AEL	2018–19	Super League Greece	8	0	2	0	—		10	0
Septemvri Sofia	2018–19	Bulgarian First League	8	1	4	0	—		12	1
Wisła Płock	2019–20	Ekstraklasa	18	0	1	0	—		19	0
Zrinjski Mostar	2020–21	Bosnian Premier League	5	0	1	0	—		6	0
Zrinjski Mostar	Total		52	1	11	0	4	0	67	1
Šibenik	2020–21	Croatian First League	1	0	0	0	—		1	0
Šibenik	Total		1	0	0	0	—		1	0
Career total			110	8	17	0	17	2	144	10

=== International ===
As of 13 November 2017

National team	Year	Apps	Goals
Kosovo
Kosovo	2017	1	0
Total		1	0

== Honours ==
Rabotnički

- Macedonian Cup: 2014–15

Skënderbeu Korçë

- Kategoria Superiore: 2017–18
- Albanian Cup: 2017–18
