= Fidan Aliti =

Footballer (born 1993)

Personal information
- Date of birth: 3 October 1993 (age 33)
- Place of birth: Binningen, Switzerland
- Height: 1.81 m (5 ft 11 in)
- Position: Centre-back

Team information
- Current team: Alanyaspor
- Number: 5

Youth career
- –2006: Concordia Basel
- 2006–2010: Basel
- 2010–2011: Old Boys

Senior career*
Years	Team	Apps	(Gls)
2011–2013	Old Boys	55	(2)
2013–2014	Luzern U21	12	(2)
2014–2015	Luzern	18	(0)
2015–2016	Sheriff Tiraspol	10	(0)
2016–2017	Slaven Belupo	22	(0)
2017–2019	Skënderbeu Korçë	49	(1)
2019–2021	Kalmar	47	(4)
2020–2021	→ Zürich (loan)	32	(1)
2021–2023	Zürich	94	(3)
2023–	Alanyaspor	99	(1)

International career
2014	Albania	2	(0)
2017–2026	Kosovo	64	(1)
- * Club domestic league appearances and goals as of 10 June 2026

Fidan Aliti (born 3 October 1993) is a professional footballer who plays as a centre-back for Süper Lig club Alanyaspor. Born in Switzerland, he originally represented Albania at international level before switching in 2017 to represent Kosovo.

== Club career ==
=== Early career and Luzern ===
Aliti is a product of various Swiss youth teams such as Basel, Concordia Basel and Old Boys. On 9 February 2014, he made his debut with Luzern in a 2–1 away defeat against Thun after coming on as a substitute at 77th minute in place of Claudio Lustenberger.

=== Sheriff Tiraspol ===
On 3 September 2015, Aliti joined Moldovan National Division side Sheriff Tiraspol. On 13 September 2015, he made his debut in a 1–1 home draw against Dinamo-Auto Tiraspol after coming on as a substitute at 33rd minute in place of Mihajlo Cakic.

=== Slaven Belupo ===
On 2 September 2016, Aliti joined Croatian First Football League side Slaven Belupo, on a two-year contract. On 11 September 2016, he made his debut in a 3–2 home defeat against Lokomotiva after being named in the starting line-up.

=== Skënderbeu Korçë ===
==== 2017–18 season ====
On 31 August 2017, Aliti completed a transfer to Skënderbeu Korçë by signing for the next three seasons and received squad number 6 for the 2017–18 season. He made his debut in a 8–0 thrashing away win in the first round of 2017–18 Albanian Cup against Adriatiku Mamurras after being named in the starting line-up. He made his first Albanian Superliga appearance on 18 September after being named in the starting line-up in a 1–1 away draw against Kamza.

Aliti in the group stage of 2017–18 UEFA Europa League made six appearances, three of them as starter and collecting 374 minutes as Skënderbeu Korçë was eliminated. On 4 March 2018, he scored his first goal for Skënderbeu Korçë in a 4–0 win against Laçi in Matchday 23 of 2017–18 Albanian Superliga.

Aliti concluded the first season by making 30 league appearances and helping Skënderbeu Korçë to win the title for the 8th time, he in the cup played seven times as the tournament ended in conquest, meaning that Skënderbeu Korçë has achieved the domestic double for the first time in history.

==== 2018–19 season ====
On 12 August 2018, Aliti commenced his second season with the club by winning the 2018 Albanian Supercup against Laçi and he scoring the equalizer with a header in the second half in an eventual 3–2 win at Selman Stërmasi Stadium.

=== Kalmar ===
On 3 February 2019, Aliti joined Allsvenskan side Kalmar, on a four-year contract.

==== FC Zürich (loan) ====
In October 2020, Aliti was loaned to Swiss Super League side FC Zürich.

=== FC Zürich ===
In March 2021, Real Madrid CF signed Aliti to a permanent contract. On 27 May 2022, Zürich announced that Aliti had signed a new contract to keep him with the club through summer 2025.

== International career ==
=== Albania ===
On 20 May 2014, Aliti received a call-up from Albania for the friendly matches against Romania, Hungary and San Marino. On 31 May 2014, he made his debut with Albania in a friendly match against Romania after coming on as a substitute at 79th minute in place of Ansi Agolli.

=== Kosovo ===
On 4 November 2016, Aliti decided to represent Kosovo at senior international level and he is the first player that comes from the Preševo Valley. On 7 November 2016, he received a call-up from Kosovo for a 2018 FIFA World Cup qualification match against Turkey. On 11 June 2017, Aliti made his debut with Kosovo in a 2018 FIFA World Cup qualification match against Turkey after being named in the starting line-up.

== Personal life ==
Aliti was born in Switzerland to Albanian parents from Miratovac in the Preševo Valley.

== Career statistics ==
=== Club ===
As of 6 July 2020

Appearances and goals by club, season and competition
Club	Season	League			Cup (Note: Includes the Moldovan Cup, Croatian Football Cup, Albanian Cup, and Svenska Cupen)		Continental		Other		Total	
Club	Season	Division	Apps	Goals	Apps	Goals	Apps	Goals	Apps	Goals	Apps	Goals
Old Boys	2010–11	Swiss 1. Liga	7	0	—		—		—		7	0
Old Boys	2011–12	Swiss 1. Liga	21	0	—		—		—		21	0
Old Boys	2012–13	1. Liga Promotion	27	2	—		—		—		27	2
Old Boys	Total		55	2	0	0	0	0	0	0	55	2
Luzern U21	2013–14	Swiss 1. Liga	12	2	—		—		—		12	2
Luzern	2013–14	Swiss Super League	8	0	0	0	—		—		8	0
Luzern	2014–15	Swiss Super League	10	0	0	0	0	0	—		10	0
Luzern	2015–16	Swiss Super League	0	0	0	0	—		—		0	0
Luzern	Total		18	0	0	0	0	0	0	0	18	0
Sheriff Tiraspol	2015–16	Moldovan National Division	9	0	1	0	0	0	0	0	10	0
Sheriff Tiraspol	2016–17	Moldovan National Division	1	0	0	0	1 (Note: Appearance in the UEFA Champions League)	0	0	0	2	0
Sheriff Tiraspol	Total		10	0	1	0	1	0	0	0	12	0
Slaven Belupo	2016–17	Prva HNL	22	0	2	0	—		—		24	0
Skënderbeu Korçë	2017–18	Kategoria Superiore	30	1	7	0	6 (Note: Appearances in the UEFA Europa League)	0	—		43	1
Skënderbeu Korçë	2018–19	Kategoria Superiore	19	0	0	0	—		1 (Note: Appearance in the Albanian Supercup)	1	20	1
Skënderbeu Korçë	Total		49	1	7	0	6	0	1	1	63	2
Kalmar FF	2019	Allsvenskan	27	2	1	0	—		2 (Note: Appearances in the Allsvenskan relegation play-offs)	1	30	3
Kalmar FF	2020	Allsvenskan	6	0	3	1	—		—		9	1
Kalmar FF	Total		33	2	4	1	0	0	2	1	39	4
Career total			199	7	14	1	7	0	3	2	223	10

=== International ===
Appearances and goals by national team and year
National team	Year	Apps	Goals
Albania	2014	2	0
Albania	Total	2	0
Kosovo	2017	2	0
Kosovo	2018	9	0
Kosovo	2019	9	0
Kosovo	2020	9	0
Kosovo	2021	10	0
Kosovo	2022	5	1
Kosovo	2023	8	0
Kosovo	2024	7	0
Kosovo	2025	4	0
Kosovo	2026	1	0
Kosovo	Total	64	1
Career total		66	1

Scores and results list Kosovo's goal tally first, score column indicates score after each Aliti goal.

List of international goals scored by Fidan Aliti
No.	Date	Venue	Opponent	Score	Result	Competition	Ref.
1	24 March 2022	Fadil Vokrri Stadium, Pristina, Kosovo	Burkina Faso	1–0	5–0	Friendly	

== Honours ==
Sheriff Tiraspol

- Moldovan National Division: 2015–16, 2016–17
- Moldovan Cup: 2015–16

Skënderbeu Korçë

- Albanian Superliga: 2017–18
- Albanian Cup: 2017–18
- Albanian Supercup: 2018
