= Nešpor =

Nešpor (feminine: Nešporová) is a Czech surname. The surname was derived from the Old Czech word nešpor (with origins in the Latin word vesper), which means 'the time between noon and evening' and referred to afternoon devotions. Notable people with the surname include:

- Daniel Nešpor (born 1987), Czech footballer
- Marina Nespor (born 1949), Italian linguist
- Martin Nešpor (born 1990), Czech footballer
