= 2018 Albanian Supercup =

Skënderbeu	Laçi
3	2
- Date: 12 August 2018
- Venue: Selman Stërmasi Stadium, Tirana
- Referee: Juxhin Xhaja

The 2018 Albanian Supercup was the 25th edition of the Albanian Supercup, an annual Albanian football match. The teams were decided by taking the winner of the previous season's Albanian Superliga and the runner-up of the Albanian Cup.

The match was contested by Skënderbeu, champions of the 2017–18 Albanian Superliga, and Laçi, the 2017–18 Albanian Cup runner-up. The match was held at Selman Stërmasi Stadium in Tirana for the third consecutive year.

== Details ==
12 August 2018
19:45 CEST

Skënderbeu	3−2	Laçi
Aliti 54'; Muzaka 68' (pen.); Bregu 71'		Lushkja 48'; Xhixha 84'

Selman Stërmasi Stadium, Tirana

Match officials:

- Assistant referees:
  - Rejdi Avdo
  - Ridiger Cokaj
- Fourth official: Ardian Beqiri (Albania)

Match rules

- 90 minutes
- 30 minutes extra-time if the scores still level
- Penalty shoot-out if scores still level
- Six named substitutes, of which three may be used

== See also ==
- 2017–18 Albanian Superliga
- 2017–18 Albanian Cup
