= Troplini =

Troplini is a surname. Notable people with the surname include:

- Rejnaldo Troplini (born 1994), Albanian footballer
- Shkëlqim Troplini (born 1966), Albanian wrestler
