= Donjet Shkodra =

Kosovo Albanian footballer

Personal information
- Full name: Donjet Shkodra
- Date of birth: 30 April 1989 (age 37)
- Place of birth: Pristina, SFR Yugoslavia
- Height: 1.82 m (6 ft 0 in)
- Position: Attacking midfielder

Senior career*
Years	Team	Apps	(Gls)
2008–2010	KRC Waregem		
2010–2011	Wielsbeke	27	(4)
2011–2012	Sint-Niklaas	2	(0)
2012–2013	Ronse	32	(10)
2013–2015	Eendracht Aalst	61	(12)
2015–2016	Deinze	26	(3)
2016–2017	Flamurtari	26	(9)
2017–2018	Skënderbeu	6	(1)
2018	Kukësi	35	(2)
2019	Shakhter Karagandy	28	(4)
2020	Zhetysu	17	(2)
2021	Atyrau	9	(0)
- * Club domestic league appearances and goals as of 09:44, 28 July 2021 (UTC)

Donjet Shkodra (born 30 April 1989) is a Kosovo Albanian professional footballer who plays as an attacking midfielder for KF Gjilani.

== Club career ==
=== Eendracht Aalst ===
On 24 April 2013, Shkodra joined Eendracht Aalst by signing a one-year contract with an option of a further one. He made his official debut for the club on 3 August 2013 by playing as a substitute in a 2–0 away defeat against Antwerp.

=== Deinze ===
For the 2015–16 season Shkodra signed with Deinze of Belgian First Division B. He league debut would come on 8 August 2015 in team's 1–0 win over Patro Eisden, where Shkodra was sent off in the 82nd minute after a second bookable offence.

=== Flamurtari Vlorë ===
On 4 July 2016, Shkodra completed a move to Flamurtari Vlorë of Albanian Superliga as a free agent. He was presented on the same day, where he was handed squad number 10. He made his competitive debut on 7 September in the opening league match of 2016–17 season, scoring his team's only goal in a 2–1 away defeat to Skënderbeu Korçë. In the second matchday against the newly promoted side Luftëtari Gjirokastër, Shkodra scored two goals, both long-range strikes, in an eventual 5–0 home win for the first three points of the campaign. On 5 November, Shkodra scored the first goal of the 2–0 home win against Skënderbeu Korçë, giving the team its second consecutive league win.

On 6 December, he was again on the scoresheet, netting the winner against Tirana to give the team 3 vital points. Later that month, Shkodra suffered an injury in right leg which kept him sidelined for about three months. He returned in action in March of the following year, making his first appearance on 11th, starting and playing the whole match against Partizani Tirana. He finished his first and only Flamurtari season by making 30 appearances, including 26 in league, scoring 11 goals, including 9 leagues goals, as the team avoided the relegation by just one point. In June 2017, Shkodra confirmed his departure from the club.

=== Skënderbeu Korçë ===
On 3 June 2017, Skënderbeu Korçë's president Ardian Takaj confirmed that the club has reached an agreement with Shkodra. Three days later, Shkodra confirmed via an open letter that he was leaving Flamurtari for Skënderbeu. He was presented to the media on 7 June where he penned a two-year contract. He stated: "I'm happy to be part of the best team in Albania in the recent years. I'm ready to give 100% for this team.

He played mostly as second-fiddle in Skënderbeu's historic run in the 2017–18 UEFA Europa League qualifying rounds, becoming the first Albanian club to pass four rounds. He made only four appearances, all of them as substitute, collecting 103 minutes on the field. He started the domestic season by scoring in the first leg of 2017–18 Albanian Cup first round against Adriatiku Mamurras. Three days later he played his first Albanian Superliga match for Skënderbeu in the opening matchday against Flamurtari Vlorë, contributing in a 2–0 home win. He scored his maiden league goal in the next matchday at newly promoted Kamza, finished in a 1–1 draw.

Shkodra failed to make an impact and remained mostly to bench during his stint, making only 6 league appearances, collecting only 298 minutes.

=== Kukësi ===
On 3 January 2018, Shkodra agreed personal terms and joined defending champions Kukësi. He signed a contract running until 2020 worth €8,000 per month and was allocated squad number 10. Shkodra made his competitive debut later on 26 January in the 1–3 win at Vllaznia Shkodër, assisting the second goal scored by Filip Žderić. His first score-sheet contributions came in his sixth league appearance for the club, netting the second in an eventual 2–2 home draw versus his ex team Skënderbeu Korçë. He refused to celebrate in the process.

=== Shakhter Karagandy ===
On 24 February 2019, Shakhter Karagandy announced the signing of Shkodra on a one-year contract. On 20 June 2019, Shakhter Karagandy extended their contract with Shkodra until the end of the 2020 season.

== Style of play ==
He is famous due to his long-range strikes and free kicks.

== Personal life ==
Shkodra was born in Pristina to Kosovar Albanian parents but grew up in Gnjilane. He emigrated to Belgium from Kosovo in 1998 during the war time along with his family.

== Career statistics ==
As of 4 March 2018

Club statistics
Club	Season	League			Cup		Continental		Total	
Club	Season	Division	Apps	Goals	Apps	Goals	Apps	Goals	Apps	Goals
KSC Wielsbeke	2010–11	Belgian Second Amateur Division	27	4	—		—		27	4
Sint-Niklaas	2011–12	Belgian First Division B	2	0	—		—		2	0
Ronse	2012–13	Belgian Second Amateur Division	32	10	—		—		32	10
Eendracht Aalst	2013–14	Belgian First Division B	32	4	—		—		32	4
Eendracht Aalst	2014–15	Belgian First Division B	29	8	1	0	—		30	8
Eendracht Aalst	Total		61	12	1	0	—		62	12
Deinze	2015–16	Belgian First Division B	26	3	2	0	—		28	3
Flamurtari Vlorë	2016–17	Albanian Superliga	26	9	4	2	—		30	11
Skënderbeu Korçë	2017–18	Albanian Superliga	6	1	4	2	5 (Note: All appearance(s) in UEFA Europa League)	0	15	3
Kukësi	2017–18	Albanian Superliga	7	1	2	0	—		9	1
Career total			187	40	13	4	5	0	205	44
