= Danilo Alves (footballer, born 1991) =

Brazilian footballer

Personal information
- Full name: Danilo Almeida Alves
- Date of birth: 11 April 1991 (age 35)
- Place of birth: Baixa Grande, Brazil
- Height: 1.87 m (6 ft 2 in)
- Position: Forward

Team information
- Current team: ABC
- Number: 23

Senior career*
Years	Team	Apps	(Gls)
2011	Quixadá	8	(1)
2011	Penapolense	0	(0)
2011	Luverdense	3	(0)
2012	Portuguesa	10	(1)
2013	Avaí	11	(1)
2013	Vila Nova	0	(0)
2014	Sorocaba	12	(6)
2014	Bragantino	5	(0)
2014	Criciúma	5	(0)
2014–2015	São Bento	8	(0)
2016–2018	Flamurtari	73	(13)
2018	Afjet Afyonspor	2	(0)
2018	Flamurtari	10	(4)
2019	Okzhetpes	27	(6)
2020	Suwon FC	12	(3)
2021	Kyzylzhar	11	(3)
2021–2022	Suphanburi	26	(11)
2022–2023	Chonburi	23	(14)
2023–2024	BG Pathum United	21	(6)
2024	PSS Sleman	12	(2)
2025–	ABC	7	(0)
- * Club domestic league appearances and goals as of 13 April 2025

Danilo Almeida Alves (born 11 April 1991) is a Brazilian professional footballer who plays as a forward for Brazilian club ABC.

== Career ==
=== Flamurtari Vlorë ===
On 4 January 2016, Alves joined Albanian Superliga side Flamurtari Vlorë by penning a contract until the end of the season. He was presented on the same day where he was allocated squad number 99. He made his competitive debut later on 24 January, starting in the first leg of 2015–16 Albanian Cup quarter-final tie against Tirana, unable to avoid the 1–0 home defeat. Alves' league debut would come six days later in the matchday 19 against Teuta Durrës, playing the entire match as Flamurtari took the first three points of 2016. Alves endured a 653-minute scoreless run across seven matches until 2 April, when he scored his maiden Flamurtari goal, in a 1–1 away draw against the same opponents.

He had a slow first part of season, netting only once in 16 league matches; the opening of a 3–1 home win over newbie Lushnja on 16 September. Two weeks later, Alves received criticism from manager Shpëtim Duro after missing several good chances to score in the goalless home draw versus Luftëtari Gjirokastër. Alves responded the next day via a Facebook status, stating that Duro has put many players out of position, including him. The issue was solved two days later by club administrator Sinan Idrizi.

Alves captained Flamurtari for the first time on 19 November 2017 in the 1–0 win at Lushnja, wearing the armband from 41st minute following the substitution of Tomislav Bušić. In December 2017, he signed a new three-year contract that would keep him at Vlora until 2021.

Alves was the main protagonist of the 2017–18 Albanian Cup quarter-final first leg versus Partizani Tirana by netting a volley from 25 metres following a mistake from goalie Alban Hoxha to give Flamurtari the 1–0 win at home. It was his first goal after four months and 15 matches. Following the match Alves described the goal as a "big relief". Alves scored his first league goal since September 2017 on 4 February, a header in the 1–1 draw at Kukësi; it was the first time ever that Flamurtari doesn't lose at Zeqir Ymeri Stadium.

== Career statistics ==
As of 27 December 2024

Appearances and goals by club, season and competition
Club	Season	League			Cup		Other		Total	
Club	Season	Division	Apps	Goals	Apps	Goals	Apps	Goals	Apps	Goals
Flamurtari Vlorë	2015–16	Albanian Superliga	16	5	4	0	—		20	5
Flamurtari Vlorë	2016–17	Albanian Superliga	29	5	3	0	—		32	5
Flamurtari Vlorë	2017–18	Albanian Superliga	28	3	4	2	—		32	7
Flamurtari Vlorë	Total		73	13	11	2	—		84	15
Afjet Afyonspor	2018–19	TFF First League	2	0	0	0	—		2	0
Flamurtari Vlorë	2018–19	Albanian Superliga	10	4	1	1	—		11	5
Okzhetpes	2019	Kazakhstan Premier League	27	6	0	0	—		27	6
Suwon	2020	K League	12	3	1	0	—		13	3
Kyzylzhar	2021	Kazakhstan Premier League	11	3	0	0	—		11	3
Suphanburi	2021–22	Thai League 1	26	11	4	6	—		30	17
Chonburi	2022–23	Thai League 1	23	14	1	0	—		24	14
BG Pathum United	2023–24	Thai League 1	21	6	1	1	—		22	7
PSS Sleman	2024–25	Liga 1	12	2	0	0	—		12	2
Career total			217	62	19	10	0	0	236	72

== Honours ==
BG Pathum United

- Thai League Cup: 2023–24
