= Shend Kelmendi =

Kosovar footballer

Personal information
- Date of birth: 21 September 1994 (age 32)
- Place of birth: Pristina, FR Yugoslavia
- Height: 1.87 m (6 ft 2 in)
- Position: Right winger

Team information
- Current team: Gjilani
- Number: 27

Youth career
- –2013: Prishtina

Senior career*
Years	Team	Apps	(Gls)
2013–2017	Prishtina	67	(11)
2017	Trepça'89	0	(0)
2017–2018	Skënderbeu Korçë	1	(0)
2018	→ Trepça'89 (loan)	4	(0)
2018	Llapi	7	(1)
2019–2020	Flamurtari	40	(14)
2020–	Gjilani	50	(11)
- * Club domestic league appearances and goals as of 25 March 2024

Shend Kelmendi (born 21 September 1994) is a Kosovar professional footballer who plays as a forward for Gjilani.

== Club career ==
=== Prishtina ===
On 13 September 2013. Kelmendi made his debut with Prishtina in a Football Superleague of Kosovo match against Gjilani after coming on as a substitute at 29th minute in place of Liridon Latifi.

=== Trepça'89 ===
On 22 July 2017. Kelmendi signed to Football Superleague of Kosovo side Trepça'89.

=== Skënderbeu Korçë ===
On 10 August 2017. Kelmendi completed a transfer to Skënderbeu Korçë by signing for the next three seasons and received squad number 9. One day later, the club confirmed that Kelmendi had joined on a permanent transfer.

On 6 September 2017. Kelmendi made his competitive debut for the club in the first leg of 2017–18 Albanian Cup first round, scoring the opener in an 8–0 thrashing of Adriatiku Mamurras. Later, on 29 November 2017. Kelmendi was on the score-sheet again in this competition, where he netted the lone goal of the match against Besëlidhja Lezhë for the second round.

He made his first Albanian Superliga appearance on 22 December by entering in the last minutes of the 3–1 home win over Teuta Durrës.

==== Loan to Trepça'89 ====
On 20 January 2018, Kelmendi was sent on loan at Football Superleague of Kosovo outfit KF Trepça'89 for the remainder of the season.

=== KF Llapi ===
On 17 June 2018, Kelmendi signed for KF Llapi on a 2-year deal.

=== KF Flamurtari ===
On 27 December 2018, it was announced that Kelmendi had signed with KF Flamurtari.

== Career statistics ==
As of 20 January 2018

Club	Season	League			Cup		Europe		Other		Total	
Club	Season	Division	Apps	Goals	Apps	Goals	Apps	Goals	Apps	Goals	Apps	Goals
Prishtina	2013–14	Football Superleague of Kosovo	16	2	—						16	2
Prishtina	2014–15	Football Superleague of Kosovo	—									
Prishtina	2015–16	Football Superleague of Kosovo	28	7	—						28	7
Prishtina	2016–17	Football Superleague of Kosovo	23	2	1	0	—		1 (Note: Appearance in Kosovan Supercup)	0	24	2
Prishtina	2017–18	Football Superleague of Kosovo	0	0	0	0	1 (Note: All appearance(s) in UEFA Europa League)	0	0	0	1	0
Prishtina	Total		67	11	1	0	1	0	1	0	69	11
Trepça'89	2017–18	Football Superleague of Kosovo	0	0	0	0	—		—		0	0
Skënderbeu Korçë	2017–18	Albanian Superliga	1	0	4	3	—		—		5	3
Trepça'89 (loan)	2017–18	Football Superleague of Kosovo	1	0	1	0	—		—		2	0
Career total			69	11	6	3	1	0	1	0	76	15
