= Erjon Dragoj =

Albanian footballer

Personal information
- Date of birth: 6 September 1999 (age 27)
- Place of birth: Pogradec, Albania
- Height: 1.80 m (5 ft 11 in)
- Position: Forward

Team information
- Current team: Lushnja
- Number: 70

Youth career
- 2011–2018: Pogradeci
- 2018–2019: Laçi

Senior career*
Years	Team	Apps	(Gls)
2016–2018	Pogradeci	2	(0)
2018–2019	Laçi	1	(0)
2019–2021	Pogradeci	40	(8)
2021–2024	Korabi	70	(6)
2024–	Lushnja	17	(0)
- * Club domestic league appearances and goals as of 1 June 2024

Erjon Dragoj (born 6 September 1999) is an Albanian professional footballer who plays as a forward for Lushnja.

== Club career ==
He participated for the first time with the first team of Pogradeci under coach Gentian Stojku on 5 December 2015 in a 2015–16 Albanian First Division match against Dinamo Tirana where he was on the bench for the entire game. His next game would come later the next season on 28 September 2016 against the same opponent Dinamo Tirana in a match valid for the 2016–17 Albanian Cup where Dragoj made his debut coming on as a substitute in the 63rd minute for Eldjon Topllari in a 2–1 loss. His third game for Pogradeci came later in the following season on 27 September 2017 against Shkumbini Peqin in a match valid for the 2017–18 Albanian Cup where Dragoj played the full 90-minutes match and managed to score his first professional goal in the last minute to give his side the 1–1 draw in the deadly end which however was not enough as Shkumbini Peqini qualified on aggregate 3–1 after winning the first leg 2–0. Erjon Dragoj was transferred from Pogradeci first division in Albania to Laci in Superliga at January 2018 and stay at this club until January 2019. He debut in Superliga in 25/11/2018 Laci-Kastrioti 2–1. He played for the first time with team Laci in official match at 12/09/2018 in national cup Naftetari-Laci 0–5.

== International career ==
He received his first call up for the Albania under-20 side by coach of the under-21 team Alban Bushi for the double friendly match against Azerbaijan U-21 on 21 & 26 January 2018.
