= Ermir Rezi =

Albanian footballer (born 1994)

Personal information
- Full name: Ermir Zyber Rezi
- Date of birth: 12 May 1994 (age 32)
- Place of birth: Maminas, Durrës County, Albania
- Height: 1.74 m (5 ft 9 in)
- Position: Second striker

Team information
- Current team: Erzeni
- Number: 11

Youth career
- 2007–2011: Tirana
- 2011–2013: Teuta Durrës

Senior career*
Years	Team	Apps	(Gls)
2012–2013	Teuta Durrës	2	(0)
2013–2014	Elbasani	9	(0)
2014–2015	Dinamo Tirana	22	(2)
2015–2016	Erzeni	25	(22)
2016–2019	Kamza	80	(12)
2019–2020	Erzeni	4	(2)
2020–2021	Kastrioti	32	(3)
2021–2022	Ulpiana	29	(5)
2022–2023	Tërbuni Pukë	11	(1)
2023–	Arenzano		

International career^{‡}
2013	Albania U20	4	(0)
2014	Albania U21	1	(0)
- * Club domestic league appearances and goals as of 9 October 2019 ‡ National team caps and goals as of 6 May 2014

Ermir Zyber Rezi (born 12 May 1994) is an Albanian professional footballer who plays as a secondary striker for Albanian club Erzeni Shijak in the Albanian First Division.

== Club career ==
=== Early career ===
Began his career with KF Tirana at the age of 13 in 2007, where he would travel from his hometown Maminas in Durrës to Tirana for training under former Albanian international footballer Skënder Hodja. At the age of 15 he enrolled at the national sports school Bernardina Qerraxhia, where the school's football team was Shkëndija Durrës. As he had done at KF Tirana, he competed with age group two years older than himself, meaning he joined the under-17 team at Shkëndija, where he scored 19 goals before progressing to the under-19 side.

He became the best goalscorer in Albania at under-19 level, scoring 36 goals in 29 games to help his team finish 6th in the U-19 championship. The following season, he scored 7 goals in the first half of the campaign before transferring to the club he supported throughout his life, Teuta Durrës. During his time with Shkëndija he scored 62 goals in 65 games for both the U-17s and U-19s. At Teuta he initially joined the under-19s and scored 13 goals in the second half of the season and narrowly missed out on the national U-19 championship to Shkëndija Tiranë.

=== Teuta Durrës ===
He made his senior professional debut in an Albanian Cup match against Laçi on 20 February 2013, shortly after joining the club and scoring on his debut with the under-19s. On his debut he came on as a 55th-minute substitute for Alfred Deliallisi in the 1–0 win for his side. He made his first Albanian Superliga appearance once again in a 1–0 home win over Laçi, on 3 May 2013, coming on in the 76th minute for Ansi Nika.

He made 1 league appearance and 4 Albanian Cup appearances in the first half of the season before being loaned out to Albanian First Division side Elbasani in January 2014 for the remainder of the 2013–14 campaign. He made 9 league appearances, 6 of those from the starting lineup, as Elbasani won the First Division and achieved promotion to the Albanian Superliga.

=== Dinamo Tirana ===
On 2 September 2014, Rezi completed a transfer to fellow First Division side Dinamo Tirana by penning a one-year contract. He played his first match for the new club in the opening matchday against Luftëtari Gjirokastër, contributing with a goal in the injury time in an eventual 2–0 away win. He made 22 appearances throughout the year, scoring two goals, as Dinamo finished 6th in Group B. He left the club once his contract run out.

== International career ==
=== Albania U20 ===
Rezi was called up at Albania national under-20 football team by coach Skënder Gega to participate in the 2013 Mediterranean Games football tournament which began on 19 June 2013 in Mersin, Turkey. Rezi played in 4 out 5 Albania U20s matches in which 3 of them were full 90-minutes and 1 as a substitute. Albania U20 was ranked in the last place out of 8 teams.

=== Albania U21 ===
Rezi debuted with Albania national under-21 football team on 6 May 2014 against Italy U21 under the coach Skënder Gega coming on as a substitute in the 51st minute in place of Maldin Ymeraj as the match ended in the 1–0 loss.

== Career statistics ==
=== Club ===
As of 23 May 2018

Club statistics
Club	Season	League			Cup		Europe (Note: Including continental competitions, such as UEFA Champions League and UEFA Europa League)		Other (Note: Including other competitions, such as Albanian Supercup)		Total	
Club	Season	Division	Apps	Goals	Apps	Goals	Apps	Goals	Apps	Goals	Apps	Goals
Teuta Durrës	2012–13	Albanian Superliga	1	0	1	0	—		—		2	0
Teuta Durrës	2013–14	Albanian Superliga	1	0	5	0	—		—		6	0
Teuta Durrës	Total		2	0	6	0	—		—		8	0
Elbasani	2013–14	Albanian First Division	9	0	—		—		—		9	0
Dinamo Tirana	2014–15	Albanian First Division	22	2	—		—		—		22	2
Erzeni Shijak	2015–16	Albanian First Division	25	22	2	0	—		—		27	22
Kamza	2016–17	Albanian First Division	26	7	3	1	—		—		29	8
Kamza	2017–18	Albanian Superliga	35	5	3	3	—		—		38	8
Kamza	Total		61	12	6	4	—		—		67	16
Career total			119	36	14	4	—		—		133	40

== Honours ==
=== Club ===
Elbasani

- Albanian First Division: 2013–14

Kamza

- Albanian First Division: 2016–17

Individual

- Albania Championship U-19 top scorer: 2011-12
