= Sabien Lilaj =

Albanian footballer

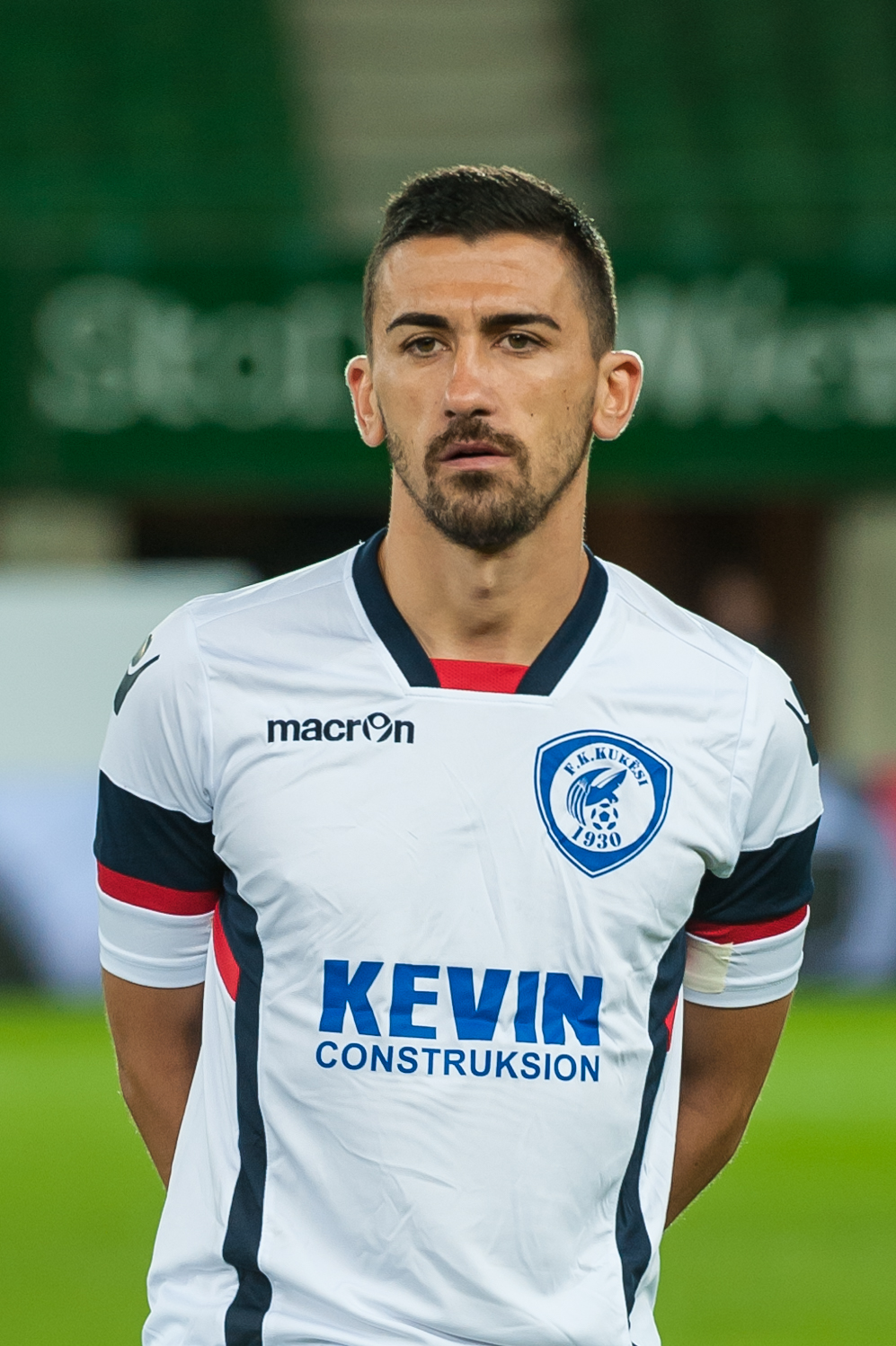
- Lila with Kukësi in the UEFA Europa League

Personal information
- Date of birth: 18 February 1989 (age 37)
- Place of birth: Maliq, Albania
- Height: 1.81 m (5 ft 11 in)
- Position: Central midfielder

Youth career
- 1999–2008: Tirana

Senior career*
Years	Team	Apps	(Gls)
2008–2011	Tirana	67	(3)
2011–2012	Lokomotiva Zagreb	15	(0)
2012–2018	Skënderbeu	164	(20)
2018–2019	Gabala	23	(0)
2019–2020	Sektzia Ness Ziona	21	(1)
2020–2022	Prishtina	27	(3)
2022–2023	Dinamo Tirana	34	(2)

International career
2009-2010	Albania U20	2	(0)
2009–2010	Albania U21	7	(0)
2011–2018	Albania	16	(0)

Managerial career
- 2024–2025: Tirana (assistant)
- 2025–: Struga (assistant)
- * Club domestic league appearances and goals

Sabien Lilaj (born 18 February 1989) is an Albanian former professional footballer who played as a central midfielder.

== Club career ==
=== Early career ===
Lilaj was born in Maliq, Korçë County, but moved to the capital Tirana along with his family at the age of eight, where he began playing football at the Loro Boriçi sports mastery school at the age of ten, playing for the school's football team Shkëndija Tiranë.

=== Tirana ===
In the summer of 2008, he went on trial with KF Tirana, where he was spotted by the head coach Blaž Slišković, who was impressed with the 19-year-old and signed him ahead of the 2008–09 campaign. He made his league debut in the opening game of the 2008–09 Albanian Superliga against Vllaznia Shkodër, where he started the game in midfield in a goalless draw. He scored his first professional goal in a 3–2 away win over local rivals Dinamo Tirana. In total he made 20 league appearances in his debut season, where he also won the Albanian Superliga for the first time. He also made two appearances in the club's Albanian Cup run, where they reached the final but eventually lost 1–2 against Flamurtari Vlorë.

The following season, Lilaj made his European debut in the Second qualifying round of the 2009–10 UEFA Champions League against Norwegian side Stabæk, a match which ended in a 1–1 draw. He also started the return leg that ended in a 4–0 loss to his side which eliminated them from the competition. He came on at half time for Blerti Hajdari in the 2009 Albanian Supercup as they defeated 1–0 Flamurtari Vlorë, which beat them in the previous cup final. In the league, he made 23 appearances, most of which were off the bench as he struggled to establish himself in midfield in a season where his side failed to win the league where they finished third, or the cup where they reached the third round.

Lilaj began the 2010–11 season playing against Hungarian side Zalaegerszegi TE in the First qualifying round of the 2010–11 UEFA Europa League, where both legs finished in goalless draws, meaning that extra time was needed after the second leg in Zalaegerszeg, where Tirana won the tie through an Erando Karabeci free-kick in the 107th minute. His side were drawn against Dutch side FC Utrecht, where they lost the first leg 4–0 away at the Stadion Galgenwaard, but they held Utrecht to a 1–1 in the return leg at the Qemal Stafa Stadium but were ultimately knocked out of the competition. In the Albanian Superliga, his side struggled throughout the season and they finished in fifth place out of 12 teams, just two points above the relegation playoff places, but Lilaj still managed to show some good form as he made 24 appearances and scored one goal. His side did, however, have a successful 2010–11 Albanian Cup run as they defeated Dinamo Tirana on penalties in the final to win their first Albanian Cup since 2006. Lilaj scored once in the run up to the final, as well as featuring in six games, including both legs of the quarter and semi-finals, respectively and the final, where he played the full 120 minutes as Tirana won on penalties to rescue their season. He was then allowed to leave the club at the end of the season, as did many other first team players, including Andi Lila, Jahmir Hyka, Tefik Osmani and Pero Pejić.

=== Lokomotiva ===
In the summer transfer window of 2011, Lilaj joined Croatian Prva HNL side Lokomotiva Zagreb, where he struggled to compete with the likes of Mateo Poljak and Marcelo Brozović for a first team place. He made just 15 league appearances as his side finished in a respectable seventh place out of 16 teams; his side also did not qualify for the 2011–12 Croatian Football Cup, meaning he could not play any other games that season. Despite having a difficult personal season, his performances did attract the interest of Albania national team head coach Josip Kuže, who gave him his first senior international call up and cap. After one season in Croatia, he left Lokomotiva to return to Albania, where he was subject to interest from a host of Albanian Superliga sides in the summer of 2012.

=== Skënderbeu ===
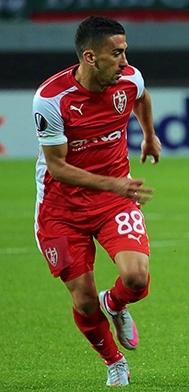
Lilaj in action during a Europa League match against Lokomotiv Moscow.

On 7 August 2012, Lilaj completed a transfer to reigning Superliga champions Skënderbeu, returning to his birthplace. He signed a three-year deal and took squad number 88. There he found his old Tirana teammates, including Ditmar Bicaj, Ivan Gvozdenović, Pero Pejić, Sebino Plaku and Daniel Xhafa.

He made his debut for the club in the 2012 Albanian Supercup where he started the game but was substituted off in the second half in the 2–1 defeat to his former side Tirana. He impressed in his first season at Skënderbeu, despite competition in the centre of midfield with captain Bledi Shkëmbi and Nurudeen Orelesi. On 3 October 2012, Lilaj scored his first goal in nearly 20 months against Olimpik in a 7–2 Albanian Cup win which also saw him receive a red card in the 85th minute. This goal was followed up by another one four days later in a Superliga match against Shkumbini Peqin. Lilaj featured in 20 league games and scored four league goals to help his side retain the Superliga title for a third consecutive season. In the Albanian Cup, he scored four goals in five appearances, including his side's only goal in the semi-finals against Bylis, who knocked out Skënderbeu after a 2–1 aggregate win over two legs. He scored 8 times in 30 games in all competitions in the 2012–13 season.

As Lilaj's side won the league the previous season, he began the 2013–14 campaign playing in the second qualifying round of the Champions League, where he played against Azerbaijani side Neftchi PFK, which Skënderbeu defeated 1–0 on aggregate after extra time, as both legs ended in goalless draws in regulation time. In the next round they faced Kazakh side Shakhter Karagandy, which defeated Skënderbeu 3–0 in the first leg, but Lilaj and his side showed resilience in the return leg as they went 3–0 up in the opening 29 minutes, only to concede twice either side of half time to win the game 3–2 as they ultimately lost the tie 5–3 on aggregate that saw them get knocked out of the Champions League. They did, however, qualify for the play-off round of the Europa League, where they were drawn against Ukrainian side Chornomorets Odesa, with the first leg in Ukraine ending in 1–0 loss for Skënderbeu. In the return leg in Albania, his side won the game 1–0 and took the tie to extra time, which did not produce any goals meaning the tie went to penalties for a spot in the group stage of the Europa League. Lilaj took his side's fifth penalty and successfully converted, but his teammates Nurudeen Orelesi and Bakary Nimaga missed the next two penalties as his side lost 7–6.

On 12 August 2014, Lilaj signed a two–year contract with Polish Ekstraklasa side Ruch Chorzów, where he even completed his medical and was presented to the media, only for the move to be annulled. He therefore returned to Skënderbeu for another season as the Albanian side claimed to have automatically renewed his contract at the end of the 2013–14 season for another year.

In June 2015, Lilaj agreed another contract extension, signing for the 2015–16 season. Later on 5 November 2015, Lilaj scored twice in just under 20 minutes as Skënderbeu recorded a 3–0 victory over Sporting CP in the 2015–16 UEFA Europa League group stage. His first goal was scored after teammates Peter Olayinka and Esquerdinha missed opportunities, but Lilaj netted in the rebound to put Skënderbeu ahead 1–0. His second came from the penalty spot as teammate Liridon Latifi was fouled by Sporting goalkeeper Rui Patrício, who was then sent off. Lilaj scored the resulting penalty past substitute goalkeeper Marcelo Boeck to put Skënderbeu 2–0 up at the Elbasan Arena. Skënderbeu eventually ran out 3–0 winners and recorded their first ever win in a major tournament.

On 28 December 2015, Lilaj was named Albanian Footballer of the Year. At the end of 2015–16 season, Lilaj earned Fair Play Award by association "Sporti na bashkon". Skënderbeu won the championship for a record 6th time, but was later revoked by Albanian Football Association; the club was also banned by UEFA from participating in the 2016–17 European competitions by UEFA for match-fixing.

In the summer of 2017, Lilaj played a vital role in Skënderbeu's 2017–18 UEFA Europa League qualifying rounds campaign, as the team achieved group stage for the second time ever and also become the first Albanian club to pass four rounds. His goal from a narrow position in the returning leg of second qualifying round against Kairat on 20 July was deciding as Skënderbeu won 2–0 and progressed 3–1 on aggregate.

Lilaj enjoyed a prolific form at the start of championship, scoring from penalty spot against Flamurtari Vlorë in opening week, Partizani Tirana in week 3, Kukësi in week 4, Teuta Durrës in week 7 and Luftëtari Gjirokastër in week 8, which lifted his tally to 5 league goals, a new personal best. He was named Albanian Superliga Player of the Month for September which made him only the fifth player to win it twice. Skënderbeu finished first phase with 25 points from 9 matches, a record in Albanian football. His performances throughout the year were rewarded as he was named Albanian Footballer of the Year for a second time on 22 December, becoming only the second player to win it twice. He finished the championship by scoring 7 goals in 27 appearances as Skënderbeu won their 8th Albanian Superliga title in history. On 27 May 2018, Lilaj played in the 2018 Albanian Cup Final against Laçi and scored the only goal of the match with a penalty kick to give the club their first ever Albanian Cup trophy. By doing so, Skënderbeu completed the domestic double for the first time ever.

After Skënderbeu was excluded from European competitions by UEFA for the next 10 years, Lilaj, whose contract ran out, decided not to renew and announced his departure after six years, in which he made more than 200 appearances and won 8 trophies.

=== Gabala ===
On 16 June 2018, Lilaj become a Gabala played by penning a one-year contract with an option of a further one, worth €500,000 per year. On 4 June 2019, Gabala confirmed that they had released Lilaj at the end of his contract.

== International career ==
=== Youth ===
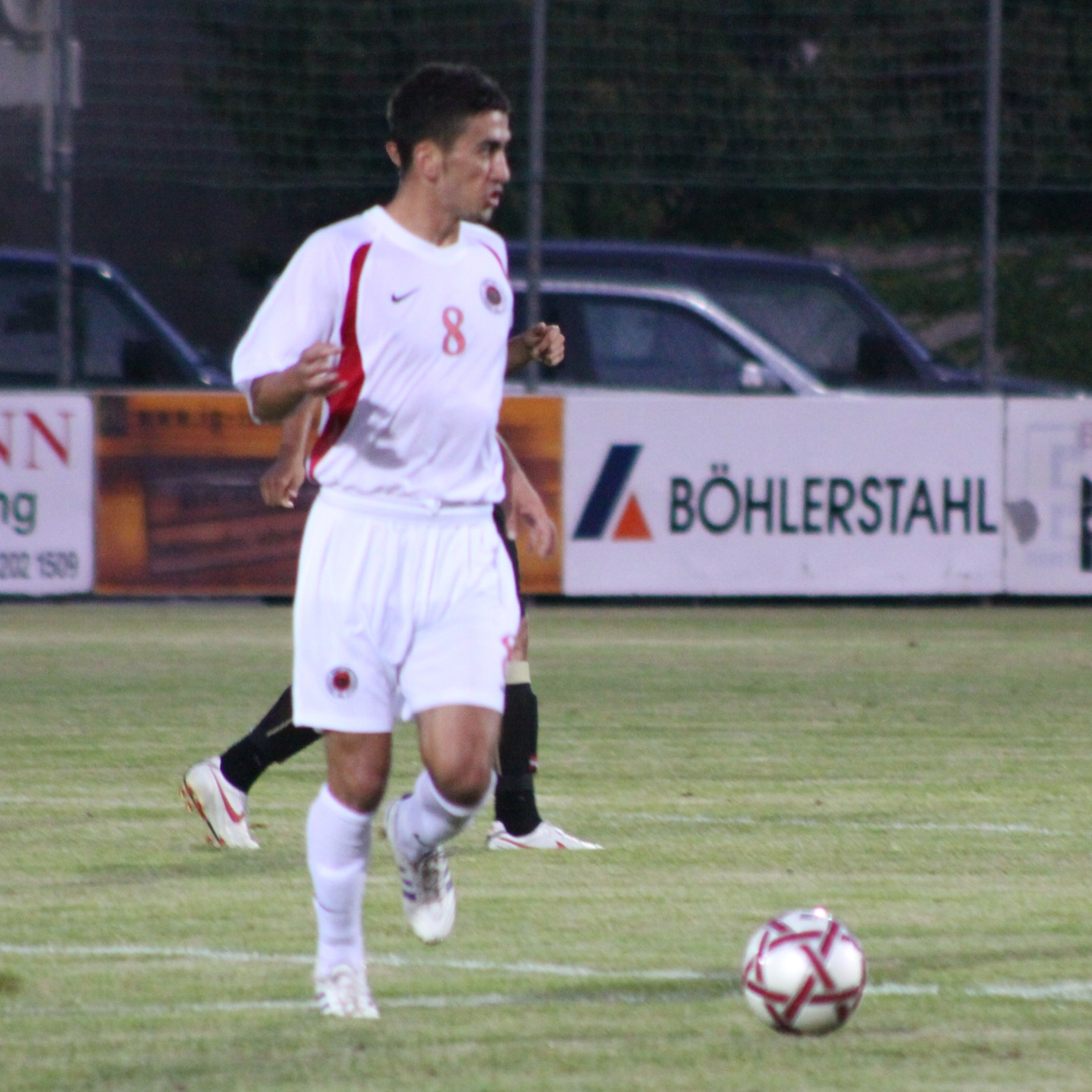
Lilaj playing with Albania U21

In June 2009, Lilaj was called up by manager of Albania under-20 side Artan Bushati to be part of the team at 2009 Mediterranean Games. He was ever-present in both matches of Group D; the first, a 1–2 loss to Tunisia, and the second, a 0–3 loss to Spain which brought the elimination from the tournament.

Lilaj was first selected for the Albania under-21 squad by coach Artan Bushati for a friendly match against Macedonia. He was picked in the 23-man squad that travelled to Macedonia for the friendly along with two other KF Tirana teammates, Enri Tafaj and Migen Metani. However, he was not able to play the friendly in Ohrid on 19 November 2008 due to an injury incurring just days before the fixture. This meant that fellow Tirana teammate Metani took his place in the squad. He was again picked by Bushati in February 2009, this time preparation for the 2011 UEFA European Under-21 Championship qualification. He was picked in the squad once again with fellow club teammate Metani.

Lilaj participated with Albania U21 in the 2011 UEFA European Under-21 Championship qualification where he was a regular starter under coach Artan Bushati playing overall 7 matches as a starter completing 5 full 90-minutes. The only game which he missed out was due to yellow card suspension.

=== Senior ===
Lilaj was first approached to Albania senior team by manager Josip Kuže for the last UEFA Euro 2012 qualifying matches against France and Romania respectively on 7 and 11 October 2011. He made his senior international debut against France on 7 October 2011, coming on as a substitute in the 81st minute for Gilman Lika in a 3–0 loss. He played also four days later against Romania the full 90-minutes match which finished in a 1–1 draw.

Lilaj then was called up by interim-manager Džemal Mustedanagić for the post-Euro 2012 qualifying friendlies against Azerbaijan and Macedonia on 11 and 15 November 2011. He played in the last 6 minutes against Macedonia on 15 November replacing Jahmir Hyka in a goalless draw. Lilaj was called up by new arrived coach Gianni De Biasi for friendlies against Qatar and Iran in May 2012. Under coach De Biasi, he played as a starter for over 60 minutes in both matches forming the defensive midfielder partnership with Ervin Bulku as Albania managed to win both matches, where they beat Qatar 2–1 in Madrid on 22 May and Iran 1–0 on 27 May in Istanbul.

Lilaj was called up regularly for the 2014 FIFA World Cup qualification but didn't make any appearances, standing on the bench for 8 matches. He was used mostly on friendlies, earning two other caps, first against Cameroon on 14 November where he played the whole first half and later 81 minutes in the second friendly against Lithuania on 26 March 2013 to help his side to take a 4–1 win at Qemal Stafa Stadium in Tirana.

== Career statistics ==
=== Club ===
As of match played 8 September 2020

Appearances and goals by club, season and competition
Club	Season	League			Cup		Europe		Other		Total	
Club	Season	Division	Apps	Goals	Apps	Goals	Apps	Goals	Apps	Goals	Apps	Goals
Tirana	2008–09	Albanian Superliga	20	1	2	0	—		—		22	1
Tirana	2009–10	Albanian Superliga	23	0	0	0	2 (Note: Appearance(s) in UEFA Champions League)	0	1 (Note: Appearance in Albanian Supercup)	0	26	0
Tirana	2010–11	Albanian Superliga	24	1	6	1	4 (Note: Appearance(s) in UEFA Europa League)	0	—		34	2
Tirana	Total		67	2	8	1	6	0	1	0	82	3
Lokomotiva Zagreb	2011–12	Prva HNL	15	0	—		—		—		15	0
Skënderbeu Korçë	2012–13	Albanian Superliga]	20	4	5	4	—		1	0	26	8
Skënderbeu Korçë	2013–14	Albanian Superliga]	29	2	7	0	6 (Note: Four appearances in UEFA Champions League, two in UEFA Europa League)	0	1	0	43	2
Skënderbeu Korçë	2014–15	Albanian Superliga]	33	4	6	1	2	0	0	0	41	5
Skënderbeu Korçë	2015–16	Albanian Superliga]	30	3	1	0	10 (Note: Four appearances in UEFA Champions League, six appearances and two goals in UEFA Europa League)	2	1	0	42	5
Skënderbeu Korçë	2016–17	Albanian Superliga]	25	0	2	0	—		1	0	30	0
Skënderbeu Korçë	2017–18	Albanian Superliga]	27	7	4	2	13	3	—		44	12
Skënderbeu Korçë	Total		164	20	25	7	31	5	4	0	224	32
Kukësi (loan)	2016–17	Albanian Superliga	—		—		2	0	—		2	0
Gabala	2018–19	Azerbaijan Premier League	23	0	4	0	2	0	—		29	0
Sektzia Ness Ziona	2019–20	Israeli Premier League	30	1	1	0	0	0	4	1	35	2
FC Prishtina	2020–21	Football Superleague of Kosovo	0	0	0	0	0	0	—		0	0
Career total			300	23	37	8	41	5	9	1	387	37

=== International ===
As of 3 June 2018

Appearances and goals by national team and year
National team	Year	Apps	Goals
Albania	2011	3	0
Albania	2012	3	0
Albania	2013	2	0
Albania	2014	2	0
Albania	2015	3	0
Albania	2017	1	0
Albania	2018	2	0
Total		16	0

== Honours ==
Tirana

- Albanian Superliga: 2008–09
- Albanian Cup: 2010–11
- Albanian Supercup: 2009

Skënderbeu Korçë

- Albanian Superliga: 2012–13, 2013–14, 2014–15, 2015–16, 2017–18
- Albanian Cup: 2017–18
- Albanian Supercup: 2013, 2014

Gabala

- Azerbaijan Cup: 2018–19

Individual

- Albanian Superliga Player of the Month: October 2012, September 2017
- Albanian Footballer of the Year: 2015, 2017
- Albanian Superliga Fair Play Award: 2015–16
