= Skerdian Perja =

Albanian footballer (born 1991)

Personal information
- Date of birth: 3 March 1991 (age 35)
- Place of birth: Kavajë, Albania
- Position: Defender

Team information
- Current team: Besa Kavajë
- Number: 3

Senior career*
Years	Team	Apps	(Gls)
2010–	Besa Kavajë	218	(12)
- * Club domestic league appearances and goals as of 1 June 2024

Skerdian Perja (born 3 March 1991) is an Albanian footballer who currently plays as a defender for KF Besa Kavajë in the Albanian First Division.
