= Shkëlqim Troplini =

Albanian wrestler (1966–2020)

Personal information
- Nationality: Albanian
- Born: 1 October 1966; Durrës, People's Republic of Albania
- Died: 7 November 2020 (aged 54); Durrës, Albania
- Height: 180 cm (5 ft 11 in)
- Weight: 100 kg (220 lb; 15 st 10 lb)

Sport
- Sport: Wrestling

Shkëlqim Troplini (1 October 1966 – 7 November 2020) was an Albanian wrestler who competed in the 1996 Summer Olympics. His son is footballer Rejnaldo Troplini.

== Death ==
On 7 November 2020, Troplini died of COVID-19 at the age of 54, during the COVID-19 pandemic in Albania.
