= Daniel Nešpor =

Czech footballer (born 1987)

Personal information
- Date of birth: 28 September 1987 (age 39)
- Place of birth: Czechoslovakia
- Position: Defender

Team information
- Current team: Vlašim
- Number: 19

Senior career*
Years	Team	Apps	(Gls)
2008–	Vlašim	44	(1)
2010	→ Bohemians 1905 (loan)	11	(0)
2011	→ Slovácko (loan)	3	(0)
- * Club domestic league appearances and goals as of 31 December 2011

Daniel Nešpor (born 28 September 1987) is a Czech football player who currently plays for Vlašim.
