= Denis Dyca =

Albanian footballer (born 1996)

Personal information
- Date of birth: 11 January 1996 (age 30)
- Place of birth: Shkodër, Albania
- Height: 1.70 m (5 ft 7 in)
- Position: Midfielder

Youth career
- 2010–2015: Vllaznia

Senior career*
Years	Team	Apps	(Gls)
2015–2017	Vllaznia	21	(1)
2017	Kastrioti	11	(4)
2018	Vllaznia B	14	(0)
2018–2019	Tomori	17	(1)
2019–2020	Veleçiku	20	(1)
2020–2021	Burreli	0	(0)
- * Club domestic league appearances and goals as of 18:19, 12 April 2021 (UTC)

Denis Dyca (born 11 January 1996) is an Albanian football player who plays as a striker.
