= Beneyam Demte =

Ethiopian footballer (born 1998)

Personal information
- Full name: Beneyam Belye Demte
- Date of birth: 18 July 1998 (age 28)
- Place of birth: Dire Dawa, Ethiopia
- Height: 1.70 m (5 ft 7 in)
- Position: Attacking midfielder

Team information
- Current team: Saint George
- Number: 7

Senior career*
Years	Team	Apps	(Gls)
2014–2017	CBE SA	74	(38)
2017–2019	Skënderbeu	25	(1)
2019–2020	Syrianska	26	(2)
2020	Umeå	22	(1)
2021	Sidama Coffee	6	(0)
2021–2022	Defence Force	23	(2)
2022–	Saint George	50	(3)

International career^{‡}
2015–	Ethiopia	35	(1)
- * Club domestic league appearances and goals as of 20:27, 8 July 2023 (UTC) ‡ National team caps and goals as of 13:55, 18 July 2026 (UTC)

Beneyam Belye Demte (Amharic: ቤኔያም ዴምቴ; born 18 July 1998) is an Ethiopian professional footballer who plays as an attacking midfielder for Ethiopian Premier League club Saint George and the Ethiopia national team.

== Club career ==
Beneyam began his career at CBE SA. From June 2017 he completed a trial in Germany at the second division Dynamo Dresden. In mid-July 2017, it was announced that Belye will not receive a contract. He then trained with the league rivals FC Erzgebirge Aue. He also had an invitation at Austria Bundesliga club FC Red Bull Salzburg for a test training. He was not obliged by both.

In August 2017, Belye finally signed with Albania to KF Skënderbeu Korçë. He made his league debut for the club on 15 October 2017 in a 4–1 home victory over KF Lushnja. He was subbed on for Ali Sowe in the 78th minute. On 23 February 2019 Beneyam joined Swedish Division 1 Norra, second Tier team Syrianska FC on a free transfer.

== International career ==
Beneyam made a debut for Ethiopia in September 2015 as he was used as a substitute in a friendly match against the Republic of Botswana.

== Career statistics ==
=== Club ===
As of 26 October 2017

Club	Season	League			Cup		Europe		Other		Total	
Club	Season	Division	Apps	Goals	Apps	Goals	Apps	Goals	Apps	Goals	Apps	Goals
Skënderbeu Korçë	2017–18	Albanian Superliga	6	0	4	2	1	0	0	0	11	2
Skënderbeu Korçë	Total		6	0	4	2	1	0	0	0	11	2
Career total			6	0	4	2	1	0	0	0	11	2

=== International ===
As of match played 9 June 2026

Appearances and goals by national team and year
National team	Year	Apps	Goals
Ethiopia	2015	10	0
Ethiopia	2016	3	0
Ethiopia	2017	–	
Ethiopia	2018	3	0
Ethiopia	2019	2	0
Ethiopia	2020	–	
Ethiopia	2021	–	
Ethiopia	2022	3	0
Ethiopia	2023	7	0
Ethiopia	2024	4	0
Ethiopia	2025	1	0
Ethiopia	2026	2	1
Total		35	1

Scores and results list Ethiopia goal tally first, score column indicates score after each Beneyam goal.

List of international goals scored by Beneyam Demte
No.	Date	Venue	Opponent	Score	Result	Competition
1	9 June 2026	Dire Dawa Stadium, Dire Dawa, Ethiopia	Malawi	1–1	1–1	Friendly
