= Daniel Fernández (football manager, born 1973) =

Uruguayan football manager

Personal information
- Full name: Hebert Daniel Fernández De Onofrio
- Date of birth: 20 February 1973 (age 53)
- Place of birth: Montevideo, Uruguay

Managerial career
- Years: Team
- 2012: Potencia
- 2012–2013: Torque (assistant)
- 2012: Salus
- 2013: Canadian (assistant)
- 2014: Canadian
- 2015: Bella Vista
- 2015: Huracán
- 2016: Liverpool (youth)
- 2017: Luftëtari

Hebert Daniel Fernández De Onofrio (born 20 February 1973), commonly known as Daniel Fernández, is an Uruguayan football manager.
