= Xhuljo Mehmeti =

Albanian footballer

Personal information
- Full name: Xhuljo Mehmeti
- Date of birth: 29 December 1993 (age 32)
- Place of birth: Kamëz, Albania
- Position: Midfielder

Team information
- Current team: Liria Prizren
- Number: 10

Youth career
- 2004–2012: Kamza

Senior career*
| Years | Team | Apps | (Gls) |
| 2012–2019 | Kamza | 123 | (10) |
| 2019–2021 | Kastrioti | 51 | (4) |
| 2021–2022 | KF Erzeni | 23 | (6) |
| 2022–2024 | Kastrioti | 49 | (4) |
| 2024– | Liria Prizren | 0 | (0) |
- * Club domestic league appearances and goals as of 9 August 2024

Xhuljo Mehmeti (born 29 December 1993) is an Albanian footballer who plays for Liria Prizren.

== Career ==
Ahead of the 2019/20 season, Mehmeti joined newly relegated Albanian First Division club KS Kastrioti.
