= Anteo Osmanllari =

Albanian footballer

Personal information
- Date of birth: 11 October 1998 (age 28)
- Place of birth: Korçë, Albania
- Position: Forward

Team information
- Current team: Drenica
- Number: 27

Youth career
- 2013–2016: Skënderbeu Korçë

Senior career*
Years	Team	Apps	(Gls)
2016–2018	Skënderbeu	1	(0)
2017	Korabi	10	(0)
2018	Burreli	12	(0)
2018–2019	Pogradeci	29	(2)
2020	Partizani	0	(0)
2021–2024	Erzeni	69	(0)
2024–2025	Partizani	5	(0)
2025–	Drenica	27	(0)

International career
2016	Albania U17	2	(0)
- * Club domestic league appearances and goals as of 22 June 2026

Anteo Osmanllari (born 11 October 1998) is an Albanian professional footballer who plays as a forward for Drenica in the Kosovo Superleague.

== Club career ==
=== Early career ===
Osmanllari started his youth career at KF Skënderbeu Korçë in the summer of 2013 as a 14 year old and was eventually promoted to the under-19 side ahead of the 2016–17 campaign where he scored 10 goals in 26 games.

=== Skënderbeu Korçë ===
Osmanllari was promoted to the first team by Andrea Agostinelli, who handed the 17 year old his professional debut in the Albanian Cup against KF Butrinti Sarandë on 28 September 2016. He came on as a 60th-minute substitute for Anesti Pejo in what was an inexperienced side who struggled against lower league opposition in a 1–1 away draw.

=== Drenica ===
In August, 2025, he joined Drenica of the Football Superleague of Kosovo.

== Career statistics ==
=== Club ===
As of 23 August 2017

Season	Club	League country	League		League Cup		Europe		Total	
Season	Club	League country	Apps	Goals	Apps	Goals	Apps	Goals	Apps	Goals
2016–17	Skënderbeu Korçë	Albanian Superliga	1	0	1	0	—		2	0
2016–17	Skënderbeu Korçë	Albanian Superliga	0	0	0	0	0	0	0	0
Total			1	0	1	0	0	0	2	0
Career total			1	0	1	0	0	0	2	0
