= Rejnaldo Troplini =

Albanian footballer

Personal information
- Full name: Rejnaldo Troplini
- Date of birth: 9 November 1994 (age 31)
- Place of birth: Durrës, Albania
- Height: 1.66 m (5 ft 5 1/2 in)
- Positions: Right midfielder; defender

Team information
- Current team: KF Erzeni
- Number: 9

Youth career
- –2013: Teuta

Senior career*
| Years | Team | Apps | (Gls) |
| 2013 | Teuta | 0 | (0) |
| 2014 | Laçi | 2 | (0) |
| 2014– | Erzeni | 152 | (13) |
- * Club domestic league appearances and goals as of 17 October 2023

Rejnaldo Troplini (born 9 November 1994 in Durrës) is an Albanian football player who currently plays for Erzeni Shijak in the Albanian Second Division. His main position is on the right side of the midfield, but he is also capable of playing as a right back. His father was Olympic wrestler Shkëlqim Troplini.
