= Ariel Muçollari =

Albanian footballer

Personal information
- Date of birth: 19 April 2001 (age 25)
- Place of birth: Vlorë, Albania
- Height: 1.87 m (6 ft 2 in)
- Position: Center-back

Team information
- Current team: Bylis
- Number: 18

Youth career
- –2019: Flamurtari

Senior career*
Years	Team	Apps	(Gls)
2019–2021	Flamurtari	36	(0)
2021–	Bylis	41	(1)
- * Club domestic league appearances and goals as of 1 June 2024

Ariel Muçollari (born 19 April 2001) is an Albanian footballer who plays as a defender for Bylis in the Kategoria Superiore.

== Career ==
=== Flamurtari ===
A graduate of the club's youth academy, Muçollari made his competitive debut for the club on 13 December 2017, coming on as a 65th-minute substitute for Xhonatan Merkaj in a 5-2 Cup victory over Turbina. It was in this match that Muçollari scored his first senior goal for the club, netting eight minutes after coming on and making the score 5–1 in favor of Flamurtari. Nearly two years later, he made his Albanian Superliga debut, playing the entirety of a 1–0 away defeat to Skënderbeu in August 2019.
