= Martin Nešpor =

Czech footballer

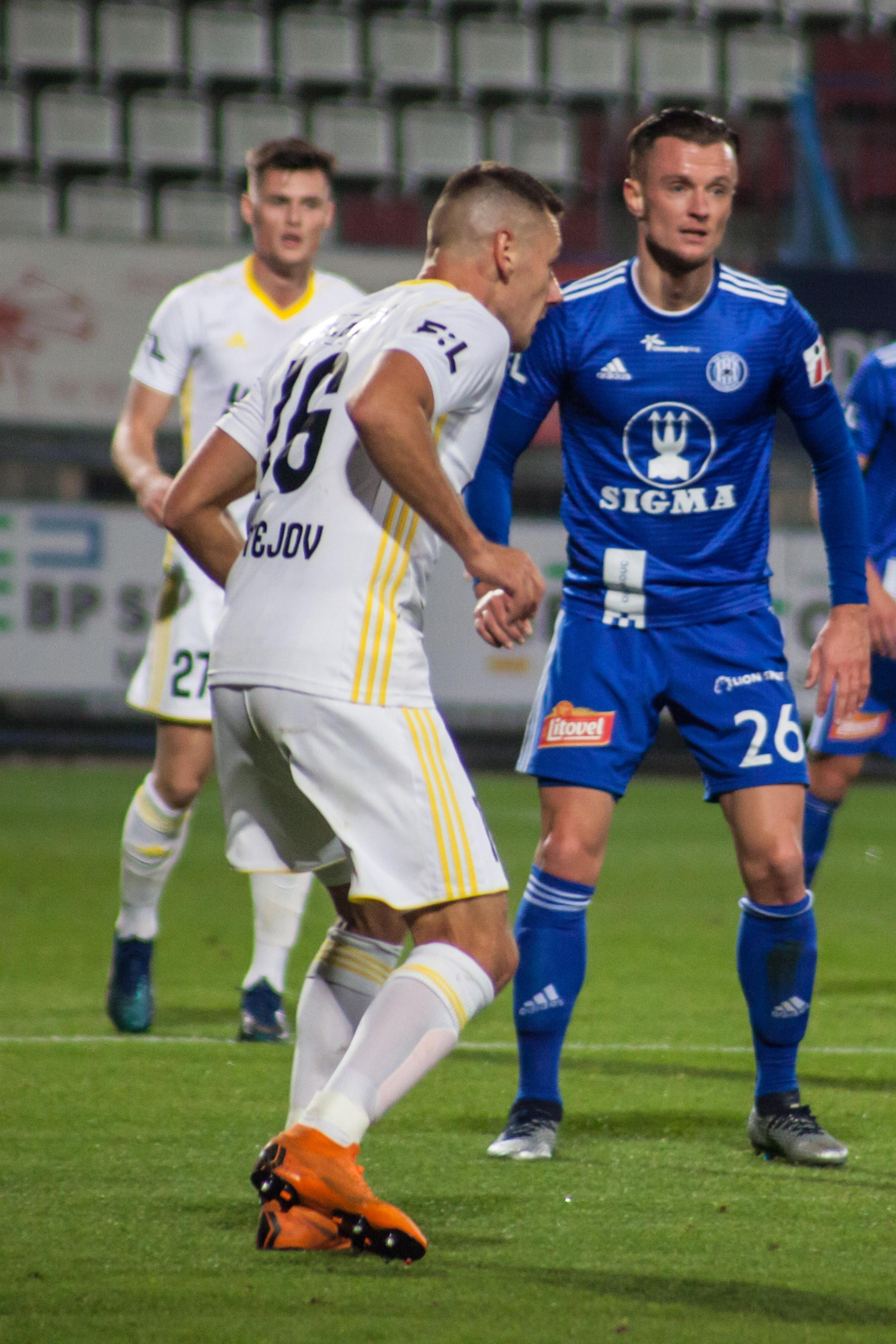
- Martin Nešpor (in blue) with Sigma Olomouc

Personal information
- Full name: Martin Nešpor
- Date of birth: 5 June 1990 (age 36)
- Place of birth: Prague, Czechoslovakia
- Height: 1.84 m (6 ft 0 in)
- Position: Forward

Youth career
- –2009: Bohemians 1905

Senior career*
Years	Team	Apps	(Gls)
2009–2013	Bohemians 1905	54	(8)
2012–2013	→ Mladá Boleslav (loan)	28	(6)
2013–2014	Mladá Boleslav	24	(9)
2014–2016	Sparta Prague	3	(1)
2015–2016	→ Piast Gliwice (loan)	33	(11)
2016–2018	Zagłębie Lubin	29	(6)
2017–2018	Zagłębie Lubin II	7	(3)
2017	→ Skënderbeu (loan)	5	(1)
2018–2021	Sigma Olomouc	63	(14)
2021–2022	Jablonec	11	(0)
2022–2023	Silon Táborsko	14	(2)
2023	SC Amaliendorf		
2023–2024	Benešov		

International career
2011	Czech Republic U20	1	(0)
2011	Czech Republic U21	2	(0)
- * Club domestic league appearances and goals as of 30 May 2024

Martin Nešpor (born 5 June 1990) is a Czech former professional footballer who last played as a forward for Benešov.

== Club career ==
=== Sparta Prague ===
On 16 June 2016, Nešpor signed to Czech First League side Sparta Prague.

==== Loan at Piast Gliwice ====
On 9 July 2017, Nešpor joined Ekstraklasa side Piast Gliwice, on a season-long loan.

=== Zagłębie Lubin ===
On 23 August 2016, Nešpor signed to Ekstraklasa side Zagłębie Lubin.

==== Loan at Skënderbeu ====
On 1 September 2017, Nešpor signed to Kategoria Superiore side Skënderbeu. On 6 September 2017, he made his debut with Skënderbeu in an Albanian Cup match against Adriatiku after being named in the starting line-up.

=== Silon Táborsko ===
On 8 July 2022, Nešpor signed a one-year contract with Czech National Football League club Silon Táborsko.

== Honours ==
Zagłębie Lubin II

- IV liga Lower Silesia West: 2016–17
