= 2018 Albanian Cup final =

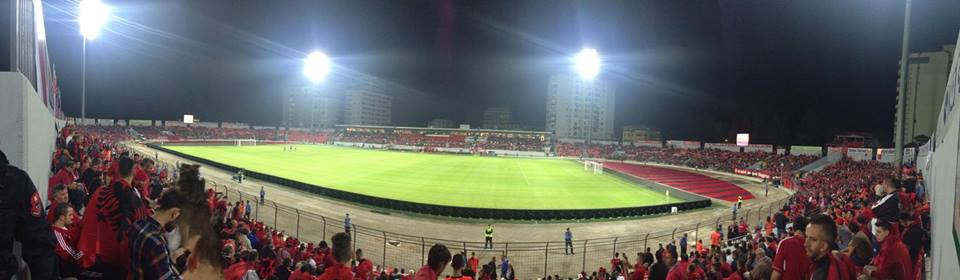
- The Elbasan Arena in Elbasan held the final
- Event: 2017–18 Albanian Cup
| Skënderbeu Korçë | Laçi |
| 1 | 0 |
- Date: 26 May 2018
- Venue: Elbasan Arena, Elbasan
- Referee: Eldorjan Hamiti
- Attendance: 3,000
- Weather: Sunny; 20 °C (68 °F); 37% humidity

The 2018 Albanian Cup final was a football match played on 27 May 2018 to decide the winner of the 2017–18 Albanian Cup, the 66th edition of Albania's primary football cup.

The match was between Skënderbeu Korçë and Laçi at the Elbasan Arena in Elbasan.

Skënderbeu Korçë won the final 1–0 for their first ever Albanian Cup title.

== Match ==
=== Details ===
27 May 2018
19:00

| Skënderbeu | 1–0 | Laçi |
|---|---|---|
| Lilaj 68' (pen.) |

Elbasan Arena, Elbasan
Attendance: 3,000
Referee: Eldorjan Hamiti
