= Abdurraman Fangaj =

Albanian footballer

Personal information
- Full name: Abdurraman Fangaj
- Date of birth: 12 October 1997 (age 29)
- Place of birth: Shkodër, Albania
- Height: 1.82 m (6 ft 0 in)
- Position: Right-back

Team information
- Current team: Egnatia
- Number: 44

Youth career
- 2011–2012: Shkodra
- 2012–2015: Vllaznia Shkodër

Senior career*
Years	Team	Apps	(Gls)
2015–2016	Vllaznia	0	(0)
2016	→ Tërbuni (loan)	14	(0)
2016–2020	Laçi	102	(3)
2020–2022	Vllaznia Shkodër	9	(0)
2022–	Egnatia	135	(1)

International career
2018	Albania U21	1	(0)
- * Club domestic league appearances and goals as of 25 June 2026

Abdurraman Fangaj (born 12 October 1997) is an Albanian professional footballer who plays for Kategoria Superiore club Egnatia. He is primarily a right-back, but can also play as a centre-back.

== Club career ==
=== Early career ===
Fangaj started his youth career at the age of 14 with Vllaznia Shkodër. During the 2011–12 season he played with Vllaznia Shkodër under-16 side. Then he moved on loan to Tërbuni Pukë under-19 for the entire 2012–13 season. He returned to Vllaznia Shkodër in 2013 where he played for the under-19 side, before he became professional aged 18 when he was called up to the first team by coach Armir Grimaj for the 2015–16 Albanian Cup match against Apolonia Fier on 28 October 2015. He was unused substitute for the entire match.

=== Tërbuni Pukë ===
In January 2016 he was loaned out one more time to Tërbuni Pukë until the end of the 2015–16 season. He was an unused substitute in his first match for Tërbuni Pukë on 6 February 2016 against Bylis Ballsh before making his debut one week later against Skënderbeu Korçë playing the full 90-minutes match in a 1–3 loss.

== International career ==
He was invited at Albania national under-19 football team for the 2016 UEFA European Under-19 Championship qualification from 12 to 17 November 2015 by coach Arjan Bellaj but he didn't manage to participate in any match.

== Career statistics ==
=== Club ===
As of 13 February 2016

Season	Club	League country	League		League Cup		Europe		Total	
Season	Club	League country	Apps	Goals	Apps	Goals	Apps	Goals	Apps	Goals
2015–16	Vllaznia Shkodër	Albanian Superliga	-	-	0	0	-	-	0	0
2015–16	Total		0	0	0	0	0	0	0	0
2015–16	Tërbuni Pukë	Albanian Superliga	1	0	0	0	-	-	1	0
Total			1	0	0	0	0	0	1	0
Career total			1	0	0	0	0	0	1	0

== Honours ==
Egnatia

- Albanian Cup: 2022–23, 2023–24
