= Latif Amadu =

Ghanaian footballer (born 1993)

Personal information
- Full name: Abdul Latif Amadu
- Date of birth: 20 August 1993 (age 33)
- Place of birth: Ghana
- Height: 1.80 m (5 ft 11 in)
- Position: Forward

Senior career*
Years	Team	Apps	(Gls)
2013–2014	Berekum Chelsea		
2014–2015	Asante Kotoko		
2016	Dinamo Brest	8	(1)
2017–2019	Teuta	59	(18)
2019–2020	F.C. Kafr Qasim	16	(3)
2020	Al-Khaleej	15	(4)
2020–2021	Al-Ansar		
2022	Llapi	10	(2)
2022	Pietà Hotspurs	9	(0)

International career
2014–2015	Ghana U23		
- * Club domestic league appearances and goals as of 31 December 2022

Abdul Latif Amadu (born 20 August 1993) is a Ghanaian professional footballer plays as a forward.
