= Uerdi Mara =

Albanian footballer

Personal information
- Date of birth: 30 January 1999 (age 27)
- Place of birth: Korçë, Albania
- Height: 1.78 m (5 ft 10 in)
- Position: Midfielder

Team information
- Current team: Dinamo Batumi
- Number: 10

Youth career
- 2011–2018: Skënderbeu Korçë

Senior career*
Years	Team	Apps	(Gls)
2015–2022	Skënderbeu Korçë	92	(3)
2022–2025	Ankara Keçiörengücü	21	(2)
2023	→ Beroe (loan)	10	(1)
2024	→ Dinamo Batumi (loan)	25	(3)
2025–	Dinamo Batumi	48	(8)

International career
2016	Albania U17	2	(0)
- * Club domestic league appearances and goals as of 10 December 2025

Uerdi Mara (born 30 January 1999) is an Albanian professional footballer who plays as a midfielder for Georgian Erovnuli Liga club Dinamo Batumi.

== Club career ==
Mara started his youth career at Skënderbeu Korçë in September 2011. During the 2015–16 season he debuted with the under-17 side, where he played 13 matches and scored also 10 goals. During the season he played a match for the under-19 side before he gained entry also with the first team.

He made it his professional debut on 12 October 2015 in the 2015–16 Albanian Cup match against Vllaznia Shkodër coming on as a substitute in the 27th minute in place of Bujar Shabani where the match finished in the 1–1 draw.

On 24 May 2016 Mara went to a trial with Primavera team of Italian Serie A side Udinese, where he participated in a friendly tournament Medunarodni Omladinski Turnir in Rijeka, Croatia.

In January 2023, Mara joined Bulgarian First League club Beroe on loan until the end of the season.

On 15 February 2024, Georgian Erovnuli Liga champions Dinamo Batumi announced the signing of Mara.

== International career ==
Mara was called up for the first time at international level in the Albania national under-17 team by coach Dzemal Mustedanagić for the two friendly match against Italy U-17 on 17 and 19 March 2015.

He was called up also for a friendly tournament in Austria against Mexico, Austria and Brazil on match-dates 25–27 April 2015. He made it his first international debut against Mexico on 25 April 2015 playing as a starter in the match finished in the 0–0 draw. He played also in the next day against Austria, coming on as a substitute in the 78th minute, where the match finished in the 2–0 loss.

== Career statistics ==
=== Club ===
As of 12 October 2015

Season	Club	League country	League		League Cup		Europe		Total	
Season	Club	League country	Apps	Goals	Apps	Goals	Apps	Goals	Apps	Goals
2015–16	Skënderbeu Korçë	Albanian Superliga	-	-	1	0	-	-	1	0
Total			0	0	1	0	0	0	1	0
Career total			0	0	1	0	0	0	1	0
