= 2017–18 Kategoria Superiore =

Kategoria Superiore
- Season: 2017–18
- Dates: 9 September 2017 – 23 May 2018
- Champions: Skënderbeu; 8th title
- Relegated: Lushnja; Vllaznia
- Champions League: Kukësi
- Europa League: Laçi; Luftëtari; Partizani
- Matches: 180
- Goals: 458 (2.54 per match)
- Top goalscorer: Ali Sowe (21 goals)
- Biggest home win: Partizani 6–0 Lushnja (28 February 2018)
- Biggest away win: Skënderbeu 1–5 Vllaznia (23 May 2018)
- Highest scoring: Teuta 6–2 Lushnja (19 May 2018)
- Longest winning run: 7 matches Skënderbeu
- Longest unbeaten run: 13 matches Skënderbeu
- Longest winless run: 22 matches Lushnja
- Longest losing run: 12 matches Lushnja
- All statistics correct as of 23 May 2018.

The 2017–18 Albanian Superliga was the 79th official season, or 82nd season of top-tier football in Albania (including three unofficial championships during World War II) and the 18th season under the name Kategoria Superiore. The season began on 9 September 2017 and ended on 18 May 2018. Title record-holders KF Tirana did not participate in the top flight for the first time since competition's foundation. Kukësi are the defending champions. Skënderbeu, won the league title on 9 May 2018 with 3 matches to spare.

Since Skënderbeu is banned from UEFA competitions, the runners-up of this season's Superliga earned a place in the first qualifying round of the 2018−19 Champions League, with the third and fourth placed clubs earning a place in the first qualifying round of the 2018−19 Europa League.

== Teams ==
Two clubs earned promotion from the Kategoria e Parë, Kamza and Lushnja, and joined the Superliga this season. Korabi Peshkopi and Tirana were relegated at the conclusion of last season.

=== Locations ===
Locations of the 2017–18 Kategoria Superiore teams

Team	Home city	Stadium	Capacity	2016–17 season
Flamurtari	Vlorë	Flamurtari Stadium	8,200	8th
Kamza	Kamëz	Kamëz Stadium	5,500	Kategoria e Parë
Kukësi	Kukës	Zeqir Ymeri Stadium	10,000	Champions
Laçi	Laç	Laçi Stadium	4,300	6th
Luftëtari	Gjirokastër	Gjirokastra Stadium	8,400	4th
Lushnja	Lushnjë	Abdurrahman Roza Haxhiu Stadium	8,000	Kategoria e Parë
Skënderbeu	Korçë	Skënderbeu Stadium	8,724	3rd
Partizani	Tirana	Selman Stërmasi Stadium^{(1)}	9,600	2nd
Teuta	Durrës	Niko Dovana Stadium	12,400	5th
Vllaznia	Shkodër	Loro Boriçi Stadium	18,022	7th

- (1) Partizani play their 2017–18 home games at the Selman Stërmasi Stadium in Tirana. The club's former home ground, the Qemal Stafa Stadium, was demolished and their new home ground at the Partizani Complex is currently under construction.

=== Stadiums ===
Flamurtari	Kamza	Kukësi	Laçi	Luftëtari
Flamurtari Stadium	Kamëz Stadium	Zeqir Ymeri Stadium	Laçi Stadium	Gjirokastra Stadium
Capacity: 8,200	Capacity: 5,200	Capacity: 10,000	Capacity: 2,300	Capacity: 8,400
Lushnja	Partizani	Skënderbeu	Teuta	Vllaznia
Abdurrahman Roza Haxhiu Stadium	Selman Stërmasi Stadium	Skënderbeu Stadium	Niko Dovana Stadium	Loro Boriçi Stadium
Capacity: 8,500	Capacity: 9,600	Capacity: 12,343	Capacity: 12,040	Capacity: 16,022

=== Personnel and kits ===
Note: Flags indicate national team as has been defined under FIFA eligibility rules. Players and Managers may hold more than one non-FIFA nationality.

Team	President	Manager	Captain	Kit manufacturer	Shirt sponsor
Flamurtari	(Albania) Sinan Idrizi	(Albania) Ardian Behari	(Albania) Franc Veliu	Kappa	—
Kamza	(Albania) Naim Qarri	(Albania) Julian Ahmataj	(Albania) Argjend Halili	Uhlsport	Mokador
Kukësi	(Albania) Safet Gjici	(Austria) Peter Pacult	(Albania) Ylli Shameti	Macron	Kevin Construction
Laçi	(Albania) Pashk Laska	(Albania) Gentian Mezani	(Albania) Taulant Sefgjinaj	Uhlsport	Baste Live
Luftëtari	(Albania) Grigor Tavo	(Albania) Hasan Lika	(Albania) Orjand Beqiri	Legea	−
Lushnja	(Albania) Fatos Tushe	(Albania) Ilir Gjyla	(Albania) Fatjon Sefa	Legea	−
Partizani	(Albania) Gazment Demi	(Albania) Klevis Dalipi	(Albania) Idriz Batha	Joma	—
Skënderbeu	(Albania) Ardian Takaj	(Albania) Ilir Daja	(Albania) Orges Shehi	Puma	Ama Cafè
Teuta	(Albania) Edmond Hasanbelliu	(Albania) Gentian Begeja	(Albania) Rustem Hoxha	Kappa	Caffè Pascucci
Vllaznia	(Albania) Municipality of Shkodër	(Albania) Ervis Kraja	(Albania) Ndriçim Shtubina	Legea	–

=== Managerial changes ===
Team	Outgoing manager	Manner of departure	Date of vacancy	Position in table	Incoming manager	Date of appointment
Luftëtari	(Serbia) Mladen Milinković	End of contract	30 June 2017	Pre-season	(Uruguay) Daniel Fernández	10 August 2017
Partizani	(Albania) Sulejman Starova	Mutual consent	6 July 2017	Pre-season	(Italy) Mark Iuliano	22 July 2017
Kukësi	(Albania) Ernest Gjoka	Sacked	23 July 2017	Pre-season	(Serbia) Mladen Milinković	29 July 2017
Laçi	(Albania) Stavri Nica	Resigned	26 September 2017	7th	(Albania) Gentian Mezani	26 September 2017
Luftëtari	(Uruguay) Daniel Fernández	Sacked	15 October 2017	7th	(Albania) Hasan Lika	18 October 2017
Vllaznia	(Albania) Armando Cungu	Mutual consent	19 October 2017	8th	(Albania) Ernest Gjoka	19 October 2017
Lushnja	(Albania) Artan Bano	Resigned	23 October 2017	10th	(Albania) Hysen Dedja	31 October 2017
Partizani	(Italy) Mark Iuliano	Mutual consent	5 November 2017		(Albania) Sulejman Starova	7 November 2017
Kukësi	(Serbia) Mladen Milinković	Resigned	23 December 2017	4th	(Austria) Peter Pacult	3 January 2018
Teuta	(Albania) Gugash Magani	Resigned	26 December 2017		(Albania) Stavri Nica	4 January 2018
Teuta	(Albania) Stavri Nica	Resigned	12 February 2018	9th	(Albania) Gentian Begeja	12 February 2018
Lushnja	(Albania) Hysen Dedja	Resigned	14 February 2018	10th	(Albania) Dritan Çuko	20 February 2018
Partizani	(Albania) Sulejman Starova	Mutual consent	5 March 2018	5th	(Albania) Klevis Dalipi	5 March 2018
Lushnja	(Albania) Dritan Çuko	End of caretaker spell	21 March 2018	10th	(Albania) Ilir Gjyla	21 March 2018
Kamza	(Albania) Ramadan Ndreu	Sacked	10 April 2018	7th	(Albania) Julian Ahmataj	11 April 2018
Flamurtari	(Albania) Shpëtim Duro	Resigned	18 April 2018	6th	(Albania) Ardian Behari	18 April 2018
Vllaznia	(Albania) Ernest Gjoka	Resigned	14 May 2018	9th	(Albania) Ervis Kraja	14 May 2018

== League table ==
Pos	Team	Pld	W	D	L	GF	GA	GD	Pts	Qualification or relegation
1	Skënderbeu (Note: In March 2018, Skënderbeu was handed a 10-year ban from UEFA club competitions over match fixing.) (C)	36	22	6	8	68	41	+27	72	
2	Kukësi	36	18	9	9	61	41	+20	63	Qualification to the Champions League first qualifying round
3	Luftëtari	36	16	11	9	47	37	+10	59	Qualification to the Europa League first qualifying round (Note: Skënderbeu qualified for the Europa League first qualifying round by winning the 2017–18 Albanian Cup. However, since they were banned from entering UEFA competitions, the spot awarded to the cup winners was passed down the league.)
4	Laçi	36	16	8	12	45	39	+6	56	Qualification to the Europa League first qualifying round
5	Partizani	36	15	8	13	41	36	+5	53	Qualification to the Europa League first qualifying round
6	Flamurtari	36	11	13	12	37	37	0	46	
7	Kamza	36	12	10	14	37	41	−4	46	
8	Teuta	36	12	10	14	55	58	−3	46	
9	Vllaznia (R)	36	12	8	16	38	42	−4	44	Relegation to 2018–19 Kategoria e Parë
10	Lushnja (R)	36	2	5	29	29	86	−57	11	Relegation to 2018–19 Kategoria e Parë

Source: Albanian Football Association (in Albanian), Soccerway
Rules for classification: 1) Points; 2) Head-to-head points; 3) Head-to-head goal difference; 4) Head-to-head goals scored; 5) Goal difference; 6) Goals scored; 7) Draw.
(C) Champions; (R) Relegated

== Results ==
Clubs will play each other four times for a total of 36 matches each.

=== First half of season ===
Home \ Away	FLA	KAM	KUK	LAÇ	LUF	LUS	PAR	SKË	TEU	VLL
Flamurtari	—	1–0	1–1	0–1	0–0	3–1	1–0	1–1	0–0	2–0
Kamza	0–3	—	2–2	3–1	0–1	2–1	1–0	1–1	1–1	1–0
Kukësi	1–1	1–0	—	3–0	1–2	1–3	1–2	1–2	4–2	2–2
Laçi	1–1	0–1	0–1	—	0–1	3–1	1–0	1–0	0–0	2–0
Luftëtari	1–1	1–2	0–3	1–1	—	2–0	5–0	2–0	2–3	0–0
Lushnja	0–1	0–0	0–2	0–3	0–0	—	0–3	1–3	2–1	0–2
Partizani	0–1	2–1	0–0	0–2	2–0	0–0	—	0–0	2–1	3–1
Skënderbeu	2–0	1–1	2–1	2–1	2–0	4–1	2–0	—	3–1	4–1
Teuta	1–2	0–1	1–2	1–1	2–1	2–2	1–2	1–4	—	1–0
Vllaznia	1–1	3–2	1–3	1–2	2–1	2–1	0–1	0–2	0–1	—

Source: Albanian Football Association
Legend: Blue = home team win; Yellow = draw; Red = away team win.

=== Second half of season ===
Home \ Away	FLA	KAM	KUK	LAÇ	LUF	LUS	PAR	SKË	TEU	VLL
Flamurtari	—	2–2	1–2	0–0	0–1	2–0	1–2	0–3	3–1	1–1
Kamza	1–0	—	0–1	1–2	0–0	2–1	0–1	1–2	1–2	0–0
Kukësi	2–2	0–1	—	1–0	2–2	2–1	4–0	2–2	3–2	2–0
Laçi	4–2	2–0	0–0	—	2–2	3–1	0–3	3–2	4–2	1–0
Luftëtari	2–1	1–0	2–1	2–1	—	2–0	2–2	3–1	0–0	0–0
Lushnja	0–2	2–3	1–2	1–3	1–2	—	1–1	2–4	2–3	0–2
Partizani	1–0	0–1	1–3	0–0	3–0	6–0	—	0–1	1–3	2–0
Skënderbeu	1–0	3–2	0–1	4–0	2–1	3–1	1–0	—	1–3	1–5
Teuta	0–0	3–3	3–2	1–0	2–3	6–2	1–1	1–1	—	2–0
Vllaznia	3–0	0–0	2–1	1–0	0–2	4–0	0–0	2–1	2–0	—

Source: Albanian Football Association
Legend: Blue = home team win; Yellow = draw; Red = away team win.

== Season statistics ==
=== Scoring ===
==== Top scorers ====
Rank	Player	Club	Goals
1	(The Gambia) Ali Sowe	Skënderbeu	21
2	(Albania) Sindrit Guri	Kukësi	20
3	(Mozambique) Reginaldo	Laçi	18
4	(Albania) Kristal Abazaj	Luftëtari	13
4	(Albania) Sebino Plaku	Kamza	13
6	(Albania) Elis Bakaj	Kukësi	12
7	(Albania) Fatjon Sefa	Lushnja	10
7	(Nigeria) James Adeniyi	Skënderbeu	10
7	(Albania) Myrto Uzuni	Laçi	10
7	(Albania) Xhevahir Sukaj	Vllaznia	10

==== Hat-tricks ====
Player	For	Against	Result	Date	Ref
(Mozambique) Reginaldo	Laçi	Flamurtari	4–2 (H)	10 March 2018	
(Albania) Sindrit Guri	Kukësi	Partizani	4–0 (H)	14 April 2018	
(The Gambia) Ali Sowe	Skënderbeu	Lushnja	4–2 (A)	9 May 2018	

Note

^{4} Player scored 4 goals; (H) – Home; (A) – Away

=== Clean sheets ===
Rank	Player	Club	Clean sheets
1	(Albania) Alban Hoxha	Partizani	14
2	(Albania) Gentian Selmani	Laçi	13
3	(Kosovo) Adis Nurković	Flamurtari	12
4	(Albania) Shkëlzen Ruçi	Luftëtari	9
5	(Albania) Orges Shehi	Skënderbeu	8
6	(Albania) Enea Koliçi	Kukësi	7

=== Discipline ===
- Most yellow cards: 11
  - (Albania) Taulant Sefgjinaj (Laçi)
- Most red cards: 2
  - (Albania) Taulant Sefgjinaj (Laçi)
  - (Albania) Ditmar Bicaj (Vllaznia)

== Attendances ==
#	Club	Average
1	Skënderbeu	2,772
2	Vllaznia	1,800
3	Flamurtari	1,684
4	Partizani	1,565
5	Luftëtari	1,033
6	Kukësi	882
7	Kamza	817
8	Teuta	617
9	Laçi	550
10	Lushnja	542

== See also ==
- Albanian Superliga
