= 2024–25 Kosovar Cup =

Tournament details
- Country: Kosovo
- Teams: 33

Final positions
- Champions: Prishtina
- Runners-up: Llapi
- Europa League: Prishtina

Tournament statistics
- Matches played: 34
- Goals scored: 110 (3.24 per match)
- Top goal scorer(s): (Kosovo) Fatjon Bunjaku (Kosovo) Norik Krasniqi (Kosovo) Ardian Muja (4 goals each)
- All statistics correct as of 22 May 2025.

The 2024–25 Kosovar Cup was the football knockout competition of Kosovo in the 2024–25 season. The winners qualified for the 2025–26 UEFA Europa League first qualifying round.

Prishtina won the cup (their ninth Kosovar Cup win) on 22 May 2025, defeating Llapi 1–0 in the final.

== Format ==
Clubs from the lower leagues (Second League and Third League) entered the preliminary rounds, competing in a knockout format until only two teams remained.

The two qualified clubs then advanced to the Round of 32, where they joined the clubs from the Superleague and the First League. From this point onwards, the competition followed a straight knockout format.

Round	Date	Matches	Clubs
First Round	26 November 2024	1	34 → 32
Round of 32	3–4 December 2024	16	32 → 16
Round of 16	11–13 February 2025	8	16 → 8
Quarterfinals	26–27 February 2025	4	8 → 4
Semifinals	8–9 April 2025 (first leg) 23 April 2025 (second leg)	4	4 → 2
Final	22 May 2025	1	2 → 1

== Bracket ==
Round of 16
Vëllaznimi	2
Gjilani	1
Prishtina	4
Suhareka	0
Feronikeli 74	0
Prishtina e Re	2
Drita	0 (5)
Dukagjini	0 (4)
Trepça	0 (2)
Drenica	0 (4)
Ferizaj	1
Rilindja 1974	0
Dinamo Ferizaj	0
Malisheva	2
Llapi	2
Vushtrria	0

Quarterfinals
Vëllaznimi	0
Prishtina	4
Prishtina e Re	0
Drita	4
Drenica	1
Ferizaj	0
Malisheva	0
Llapi	1

Semifinals
Prishtina	1	3	4
Drita	0	0	0
Drenica	0	0	0
Llapi	2	2	4

Final
Prishtina	1
Llapi	0

== Participating clubs ==
The following teams participated in the competition:

Superliga the 10 clubs of the Superleague	Liga e Parë the 20 clubs of the First League	Liga e Dytë the club of the Second League	Liga e Tretë the clubs of the Third League
Ballkani; Drita; Dukagjini; Ferizaj; Feronikeli 74; Gjilani; Llapi; Malisheva; Prishtina; Suhareka	2 Korriku; Besa Peja; Dinamo Ferizaj; Drenica; Flamurtari; Fushë Kosova; Istogu; Kika; KEK-u; Liria; Mitrovica; Prishtina e Re; Rahoveci; Ramiz Sadiku; Rilindja 1974; Trepça; Trepça '89; Vëllaznimi; Vjosa; Vushtrria	Dardania	Istogu 03; TOP Football

== Preliminary rounds ==
=== First round ===
The first-round match took place on 26 November 2024, ahead of the Round of 32 draw. Only two clubs from the Third League confirmed participation in this round. The winner of this match, along with Dardania (the only club from the Second League), advanced to the Round of 32.

Matches
26 November 2024
Istogu 03 (IV)	3–3 (5–6 p)	TOP Football (IV)

=== Round of 32 ===
The draw for the Round of 32 took place on 29 November 2024 at 13:00 CET. Teams from the Superleague and the First League were automatically qualified for the Round of 32, alongside the two teams previously qualified from the first round.

==== Seeding ====
A total of 32 teams participated in this round. All clubs from the Superleague, along with the top three clubs from each group of the First League, were seeded for this round.

Seeded	Unseeded
Ballkani; Drita; Dukagjini; Ferizaj; Feronikeli 74; Gjilani; Llapi; Malisheva; Prishtina; Suhareka; Drenica; Vëllaznimi; Trepça; Prishtina e Re; Vushtrria; Dinamo Ferizaj	Trepça '89; Liria; Besa Peja; Rilindja 1974; Istogu; Rahoveci; Mitrovica; KEK-u; Ramiz Sadiku; Vjosa; 2 Korriku; Kika; Fushë Kosova; Flamurtari; Dardania; TOP Football

==== Summary ====
This round contained 16 single-legged ties. The matches were played on 3 and 4 December 2024, with all matches kicking off at 12:00 CET.

Matches
3 December 2024
Rahoveci (II) (Note: Although the match was played in Gjilan, Rahovec was considered the home team.)	0–3	Drita (I)
4 December 2024
Vjosa (II)	0–5	Drenica (II)
Vushtrria (II)	1–0	KEK-u (II)
Flamurtari (II)	0–5	Llapi (I)
Ferizaj (I)	4–0	Ramiz Sadiku (II)
Mitrovica (II)	3–4	Vëllaznimi (II)
Gjilani (I)	4–1	Liria (II)
TOP Football (IV)	1–5	Prishtina (I)
Dukagjini (I)	6–2	Dardania (III)
Rilindja 1974 (II)	1–1 (10–9 p)	Ballkani (I)
Besa Peja (II)	1–2	Prishtina e Re (II)
Istogu (II)	1–2	Feronikeli 74 (I)
2 Korriku (II)	1–1 (1–4 p)	Dinamo Ferizaj (II)
Trepça '89 (II)	1–3 (a.e.t.)	Suhareka (I)
Fushë Kosova (II)	0–5	Malisheva (I)
Kika (II)	2–6	Trepça (II)

== Round of 16 ==
The draw for the Round of 16 took place on 11 December 2024, 14:00 CET. No seeding was applied in this round.

=== Summary ===
This round contained 8 single-legged ties. Matches were held on 11, 12, and 13 February 2025.

Matches
11 February 2025
Trepça (II)	0–0 (2–4 p)	Drenica (II)
12 February 2025
Vëllaznimi (II)	2–1	Gjilani (I)
Llapi (I)	2–0	Vushtrria (II)
Drita (I)	0–0 (5–4 p)	Dukagjini (I)
Prishtina (I)	4–0	Suhareka (I)
Dinamo Ferizaj (II)	0–2	Malisheva (I)
13 February 2025
Feronikeli 74 (I)	0–2	Prishtina e Re (II)
Ferizaj (I)	1–0	Rilindja 1974 (II)

== Quarterfinals ==
The draw for the quarterfinals took place on 19 February 2025, 13:00 CET. Eight tie winners from the previous round joined the quarterfinals, with no seeding applied.

=== Summary ===
This round contained 4 single-legged ties. Matches were held on 26 and 27 February 2025.

Matches
26 February 2025
Drenica (II)	1–0	Ferizaj (I)
Malisheva (I)	0–1	Llapi (I)
27 February 2025
Vëllaznimi (II)	0–4	Prishtina (I)
Prishtina e Re (II)	0–4	Drita (I)

== Semifinals ==
Four tie winners from the previous round joined the semifinals, with no seeding applied.

=== Summary ===
Four teams were drawn in two pairs playing each other twice, home and away. The first legs were held on 9 and 10 April 2025, followed by the second legs on 23 April 2025.

Team 1	Agg.	Team 2	1st leg	2nd leg
Drita (I)	0–4	Prishtina (I)	0–1	0–3
Llapi (I)	4–0	Drenica (II)	2–0	2–0

=== Matches ===
==== First leg ====
9 April 2025	Drita	0–1	Prishtina	Gjilan
15:00 (UTC+2)		Report	Muja 5'; Limani (red card) 26'	Stadium: Stadium with synthetic grass Referee: Ilir Mehmeti

10 April 2025	Llapi	2–0	Drenica	Podujevë
15:00 (UTC+2)	Bytyqi 29'; Marku (o.g.) 36'	Report		Stadium: Zahir Pajaziti Stadium; Referee: Dardan Çaka

==== Second leg ====
23 April 2025	Drenica	0–2 (0–4 agg.)	Llapi	Skenderaj
15:00 (UTC+2)		Report	Hasani 66', 77'	Stadium: Bajram Aliu Stadium

23 April 2025	Prishtina	3–0 (4–0 agg.)	Drita	Pristina
20:00 (UTC+2)	Muja 10', 39'; Krasniqi 44'	Report		Stadium: Fadil Vokrri Stadium

== Final ==
Originally scheduled for 14 May 2025, the final was first moved to 21 May because of a request from both club finalists and then rescheduled again to 22 May due to a conflict with the UEFA Europa League final.

=== Summary ===
According to the Kosovar Cup regulations, the final was played in the capital city of Prishtina.

=== Details ===
The "home" team (for administrative purposes) was determined by a draw.

22 May 2025
20:00 CEST (UTC+02:00)
Final

Prishtina	1–0	Llapi
A. Krasniqi 60'	Report (FFK); Report (KOHA)

Fadil Vokrri Stadium, Pristina
Attendance: 7,500
Referee: Robert Schröder (Germany)

Prishtina	Llapi

GK	50	(Kosovo) Agron Kolaj
CB	21	(Kosovo) Ron Raçi
CB	22	(Niger) Philippe Boueye
CB	3	(Kosovo) Leonat Vitija	(yellow card) 62'
LM	13	(Kosovo) Dion Gallapeni
CM	5	(Kosovo) Drilon Islami (c)
CM	4	(Kosovo) Ardian Limani
RM	20	(Kosovo) Ramiz Bytyqi
LW	10	(Kosovo) Albin Krasniqi	60'	(substituted off) 80'
RW	29	(France) Axel Gnapi	(yellow card) 69'	(substituted off) 73'
CF	9	(Kosovo) Leotrim Kryeziu
Substitutes:
GK	12	(Kosovo) Ardit Nika
DM	6	(Kosovo) Gentrit Salihu
DM	7	(Kosovo) Rilind Nimani
LB	11	(Kosovo) Ardian Muja	(substituted on) 73'	(yellow card) 89'
CB	15	(Kosovo) Diar Halili
CF	17	(Kosovo) Alban Shillova	(substituted on) 80'	(yellow card) 90'
CB	18	(Kosovo) Ardi Ajdini
LW	19	(Kosovo) Sinan Kadiri
RW	25	(Ivory Coast) Paul Junior Ngatta
RW	27	(Kosovo) Rin Ahmeti
CF	90	(England) Ronald Sobowale
CF	97	(North Macedonia) Dashmir Elezi
Manager:
(Kosovo) Arsim Thaqi

GK	1	(Croatia) Marijan Ćorić
LB	18	(Kosovo) Ilir Blakçori		(substituted off) 73'
CB	15	(Kosovo) Landrit Rama
CB	22	(North Macedonia) Muhamed Useini		(substituted off) 80'
RB	6	(Kosovo) Diar Vokrri
CM	7	(Kosovo) Hamdi Namani (c)	(yellow card) 90+5'
DM	23	(Kosovo) Besar Musolli
CM	10	(Kosovo) Arbnor Ramadani		(yellow card) 55' (yellow-red card) 58'
LW	70	(Kosovo) Valmir Veliu		(substituted off) 80'
RW	24	(Kosovo) Arianit Hasani
CF	99	(Kosovo) Ardit Tahiri
Substitutes:
GK	12	(Albania) Vokli Laroshi
CB	3	(Kosovo) Eris Avdullahu
DM	4	(Kosovo) Gentrit Talla
RB	8	(Kosovo) Benjamin Emini		(substituted on) 80'
CM	16	(Kosovo) Gentrit Limani
AM	17	(Kosovo) Ergyn Ahmeti
LB	19	(Albania) Arbër Bytyqi		(substituted on) 80'
CM	20	(Kosovo) Lulzim Peci
CF	27	(Albania) Ahmed Januzi		(substituted on) 73'
LW	29	(Kosovo) Erijon Konjufca
AM	66	(South Korea) Se-yoon Cheon
RW	77	(Kosovo) Elvir Gashijan
Manager:
(Kosovo) Tahir Batatina

Assistant referees:
- Dominik Schaal (Germany)
- Marco Achmüller (Germany)

Fourth official:

- Florian Exner (Germany)

Video assistant referee:

- Johann Pfeifer (Germany)

Assistant video assistant referee:

- Tobias Reichel (Germany)
Match rules
- 90 minutes
- 30 minutes of extra time if necessary
- Penalty shoot-out if scores still level
- Twelve named substitutes
- Maximum of five substitutions, with a sixth allowed in extra time

== Statistics ==
=== Top scorers ===
As of matches played on 22 May 2025

Rank	Player	Club	Goals
1	(Kosovo) Fatjon Bunjaku	Malisheva	4
1	(Kosovo) Norik Krasniqi	Vëllaznimi	4
1	(Kosovo) Ardian Muja	Prishtina	4
3	(Nigeria) Sunday Akinbule	Prishtina	3
3	(Kosovo) Dion Gallapeni	Prishtina	3
3	(South Africa) Kamohelo Hoala	Trepça	3
~85 other players
