= 2025–26 Kosovar Cup =

Tournament details
- Country: Kosovo
- Teams: 32

Final positions
- Champions: Dukagjini
- Runners-up: Ferizaj

Tournament statistics
- Matches played: 33
- Goals scored: 95 (2.88 per match)
- Top goal scorer(s): (Kosovo) Altin Merlaku (Kosovo) Kushtrim Shabani (4 goals each)
- All statistics correct as of 22 April 2026.

The 2025–26 Kosovar Cup was the football knockout competition of Kosovo in the 2025–26 season. KF Dukagjini won his first title and qualified for the 2026–27 UEFA Conference League second qualifying round.

== Format ==
Clubs from the lower leagues (Second League and Third League of Kosovo) will enter the preliminary rounds, competing in a knockout format until only two teams remain.

The two qualified clubs will then advance to the Round of 32, where they will join the clubs from the Superleague and the First League. From this point onwards, the competition will follow a straight knockout format.

| Round | Date | Matches | Clubs |
|---|---|---|---|
| Round of 32 | 3–5 December 2025 | 16 | 32 → 16 |
| Round of 16 | 10–18 February 2026 | 8 | 16 → 8 |
| Quarterfinals | 4–5 March 2026 | 4 | 8 → 4 |
| Semifinals | 8 April 2026 (first leg) 22 April 2026 (second leg) | 4 | 4 → 2 |
| Final | 21 May 2026 | 1 | 2 → 1 |

== Bracket ==
Round of 16
Drita | 1
Llapi | 2
Trepça '89 | 0
Malisheva | 4
Drenica | 0 (3)
Ferizaj (p) | 0 (4)
Vushtrria | 2
Vëllaznimi | 0
Prishtina | 3 (10)
Ballkani (p) | 3 (11)
Gjilani | 2
Liria | 1
Dukagjini | 1
Prishtina e Re | 0
Feronikeli 74 | 2
Dinamo Ferizaj | 1

Quarterfinals
Llapi (p) | 2 (3)
Malisheva | 2 (2)
Ferizaj | 2
Vushtrria | 0
Ballkani | 2
Gjilani | 1
Dukagjini | 3
Feronikeli 74 | 0

Semifinals
Llapi | 1 | 0 | 1
Ferizaj | 2 | 0 | 2
Ballkani | 0 | 2 | 2
Dukagjini | 3 | 3 | 6

Final
Ferizaj | 1
Dukagjini | 2

== Participating clubs ==
The following teams participated in the competition:

| Superliga (the 10 clubs of the Superleague) | Liga e Parë (the 18 clubs of the First League) | Liga e Dytë (the 3 clubs of the Second League) | Liga e Tretë (the club of the Third League) |
| Ballkani; Drenica; Drita; Dukagjini; Ferizaj; Gjilani; Llapi; Malisheva; Prishtina; Prishtina e Re | 2 Korriku; Besa Peja; Dinamo Ferizaj; Feronikeli 74; Istogu; KEK-u; Kika; Liria; Prizreni; Ramiz Sadiku; Rilindja 1974; Suhareka; Tefik Çanga; Trepça; Trepça '89; Vëllaznimi; Vjosa; Vushtrria | Flamurtari; Lepenci; TOP Football | Istogu 03 |

== Preliminary rounds ==
=== Round of 32 ===
The draw for the Round of 32 took place on 26 November 2025 at 13:00 CET. Teams from the Superleague and the First League were automatically qualified for the Round of 32.

==== Seeding ====
| Seeded | Unseeded |
|---|---|
| Ballkani; Dinamo Ferizaj; Drenica; Drita; Dukagjini; Ferizaj; Feronikeli 74; Gjilani; Liria; Llapi; Malisheva; Prishtina; Prishtina e Re; Trepça '89; Vëllaznimi; Vushtrria | 2 Korriku; Besa Peja; Flamurtari; Istogu; Istogu 03; KEK-u; Kika; Lepenci; Prizreni; Ramiz Sadiku; Rilindja 1974; Suhareka; Tefik Çanga; TOP Football; Trepça; Vjosa |

A total of 32 teams participated in this round. All clubs from the Superleague, along with the top six clubs from the First League, were seeded for this round.

==== Summary ====
This round contained 16 single-legged ties. The matches will be played from 3 to 5 December 2025, with all matches kicking off at 12:30 CET.

Matches
3 December
| Dukagjini | 3–1 | Ramiz Sadiku |
| Ballkani | 1–0 | Rilindja 1974 |
| Drenica | 1–0 | Prizreni |
| Prishtina e Re | 4–1 | Lepenci |
| Gjilani | 2–1 | Istogu |
| Besa Peja | 0–3 | Drita |
| Llapi | 4–1 | Vjosa |
| Trepça | 1–2 | Malisheva |
| Ferizaj | 2–0 | Tefik Çanga |
4 December
| 2 Korriku | 0–3 | Dinamo Ferizaj |
| Flamurtari | 0–2 | Vushtrria |
| KEK-u | 0–2 | Vëllaznimi |
| Liria | 2–1 (a.e.t.) | Suhareka |
| Istogu 03 | 0–2 | Feronikeli 74 |
| TOP Football | 0–2 | Prishtina |
5 December
| Kika | 2–4 | Trepça '89 |

== Round of 16 ==
The draw for the Round of 16 took place on 10 December 2025.

=== Summary ===
This round contained 8 single-legged ties. Matches were held from 10 to 18 February 2026.

Matches
10 February 2026
| Drenica | 0–0 (3–4 p) | Ferizaj |
| Drita | 1–2 | Llapi |
11 February 2026
| Dukagjini | 1–0 | Prishtina e Re |
| Prishtina | 3–3 (10–11 p) | Ballkani |
12 February 2026
| Gjilani | 2–1 | Liria |
| Trepça '89 | 0–4 | Malisheva |
| Vushtrria | 2–0 | Vëllaznimi |
18 February 2026
| Feronikeli 74 | 2–1 | Dinamo Ferizaj |

== Quarterfinals ==
The draw for the quarterfinals took place on 20 February 2026. Eight tie winners from the previous round joined the quarterfinals, with no seeding applied.

=== Summary ===
Matches of this round were played on 4 and 5 March 2026.

Matches
4 March 2026
| Ballkani | 2–1 | Gjilani |
| Dukagjini | 3–0 | Feronikeli 74 |
| Ferizaj | 2–0 | Vushtrria |
March 2026
| Llapi | 2–2 (3–2 p) | Malisheva |

== Semifinals ==
The four winners from the quarterfinals advanced to the semifinals, with no seeding applied. The semifinals will be two-legged. Draw took place on 10 March 2026.

=== Summary ===
Four teams were drawn in two pairs playing each other twice, home and away. The first legs were held on 9 and 10 April 2025, followed by the second legs on 23 April 2025.

| Team 1 | Agg. | Team 2 | 1st leg | 2nd leg |
|---|---|---|---|---|
| Llapi | 1–2 | Ferizaj | 1–2 | 0–0 |
| Ballkani | 2–6 | Dukagjini | 0–3 | 2–3 |

=== Matches ===
==== First leg ====
| 8 April 2026 | Llapi | 1–2 | Ferizaj | Podujevë |
| 15:00 (UTC+2) | Musolli 90+4' | Report | Hyseni (o.g.) 14'; Shabani 86' | Stadium: Zahir Pajaziti; Attendance: ~500; Referee: Alban Shala |

| 8 April 2026 | Ballkani | 0–3 | Dukagjini | Suharekë |
| 15:00 (UTC+2) | | Report | Berisha 8' Pefqeli 37' (pen.) Maliqi 90+6' | Stadium: City Stadium; Attendance: ~1,000; Referee: Lirim Jashari |

==== Second leg ====
| 22 April 2026 | Ferizaj | 0–0 | Llapi | Ferizaj |
| 15:00 (UTC+2) | | Report | | Stadium: City Stadium; Attendance: ~500; Referee: Alban Shala |

| 22 April 2026 | Dukagjini | 3–2 | Ballkani | Klinë |
| 15:00 (UTC+2) | Basriu 29' Pefqeli 75' Isufi 90+4' | Report | Tolaj 34', 58'; Diène (red card) 40' | Stadium: 18 Qershori; Attendance: ~500; Referee: Lirim Jashari |

Ferizaj and Dukagjini advance into the final.

== Final ==
The final is scheduled for 21 May 2026. According to the Kosovar Cup regulations, the final will be played in the capital city of Prishtina.

=== Summary ===
Dukagjini are set to play the fourth cup final in their history, meanwhile the third one for Ferizaj in this competition.

=== Details ===
Ferizaj was determined as he "home" team (for administrative purposes) by the competition committee.

21 May 2026
20:00 CEST (UTC+02:00)
Final

| Ferizaj | 1–2 | Dukagjini |
|---|---|---|
| K. Shabani 23' | Report | Mërlaku 17'; Berisha 74' |

Fadil Vokrri Stadium, Pristina
Attendance: 6,000
Referee: Genc Nuza (Kosovo)

| Ferizaj | Dukagjini |

| GK | 45 | (Guyana) Kai McKenzie-Lyle |
| CB | 18 | (North Macedonia) Mexhit Neziri |
| CB | 42 | (Canada) Kosovar Sadiki |
| CB | 4 | (North Macedonia) Ardit Iljazi (substituted off) 56' |
| LW | 11 | (North Macedonia) Jakup Berisha (substituted off) 86' |
| CM | 6 | (Kosovo) Alban Shabani (yellow card) 65' (substituted off) 86' |
| CM | 34 | (Kosovo) Kushtrim Shabani 23' |
| RW | 20 | (North Macedonia) Filip Gligorov (substituted off) 79' |
| AM | 49 | (Canada) Ruben Silva-Richards |
| CF | 70 | (Nigeria) Ade Oguns |
| CF | 22 | (Kosovo) Betim Haxhimusa (c) (yellow card) 35' (yellow-red card) 90+1' |
Substitutes:
| GK | 1 | (Kosovo) Petrit Terziu |
| LB | 21 | (Kosovo) Qlirim Avdulli (substituted on) 79' |
| DM | 88 | (Albania) Plarent Fejzaj (substituted on) 86' |
| LW | 7 | (Albania) Ergys Peposhi (substituted on) 86' (yellow card) 88' |
| LW | 19 | (Kosovo) Erion Sadriu (substituted on) 56' |
| LW | 32 | (Kosovo) Arlind Sejdiu |
| CM | 8 | (Kosovo) Donart Llabjani |
| CM | 26 | (Kosovo) Gentrit Ramusa |
| CM | 77 | (Kosovo) Planet Veseli |
| RW | 16 | (Kosovo) Artin Kurtaj |
| RW | 33 | (Kosovo) Leon Miftari |
| AM | 44 | (Kosovo) Dior Gërbovci |
Manager:
(Kosovo) Arsim Abazi

| GK | 1 | (Kosovo) Egzon Lekaj |
| LB | 44 | (Kosovo) Tun Bardhoku |
| CB | 4 | (North Macedonia) Besir Iseni (substituted off) 90+1' |
| CB | 5 | (Albania) Elton Basriu (c) |
| RB | 2 | (Kosovo) Albion Pllana |
| DM | 77 | (Brazil) Vitor Hugo (substituted off) 75' |
| DM | 6 | (Kosovo) Erlis Xhemajli (yellow card) 65' (yellow-red card) 70' |
| LW | 10 | (Kosovo) Altin Mërlaku 17' |
| AM | 47 | (Kosovo) Dienit Isufi (substituted off) 67' |
| RW | 8 | (Kosovo) Dardan Morina (substituted off) 46' |
| CF | 29 | (Kosovo) Hekuran Berisha 74' |
Substitutes:
| GK | 99 | (Kosovo) Dimal Isufi |
| LB | 13 | (Kosovo) Donart Syla |
| CB | 3 | (Kosovo) Melos Zenunaj (substituted on) 90+1' |
| CB | 15 | (Kosovo) Alpi Shahini |
| RB | 93 | (Kosovo) Eldonit Shaqiri |
| LW | 7 | (Kosovo) Granit Elezaj |
| CM | 17 | (Kosovo) Mërgim Pefqeli (substituted on) 67' |
| CM | 27 | (Kosovo) Valentin Hoti |
| CM | 88 | (Kosovo) Kushtrim Gashi (substituted on) 75' |
| RW | 23 | (Serbia) Iljasa Zulfiu (substituted on) 46' |
| RW | 98 | (Kosovo) Meris Maliqi |
| CF | 20 | (Ghana) Basit Abdul Khalid |
Manager:
(Kosovo) Arsim Thaqi

Assistant referees:
- Fatlum Berisha
- Bujar Selimaj

Fourth official:

- Bardh Ajeti

Video assistant referee:

- Burim Jahmurati

Assistant video assistant referee:

- Besnik Morina
Match rules
- 90 minutes
- 30 minutes of extra time if necessary
- Penalty shoot-out if scores still level
- Twelve named substitutes
- Maximum of five substitutions, with a sixth allowed in extra time

== Statistics ==
=== Top scorers ===
As of matches played on 21 May 2026

| Rank | Player | Club | Goals |
|---|---|---|---|
| 1 | (Kosovo) Altin Mërlaku | Dukagjini | 4 |
| 1 | (Kosovo) Kushtrim Shabani | Ferizaj Llapi | 4 |
| 2 | (Kosovo) Mërgim Pefqeli | Dukagjini | 3 |
| 2 | (Kosovo) Bleart Tolaj | Ballkani | 3 |
| 3 | (Kosovo) Erion Sadriu | Ferizaj | 2 |
| 3 | (Kosovo) Besar Musolli | Llapi | 2 |
| 3 | (Kosovo) Muhamet Hyseni | Llapi | 2 |
| 3 | (Senegal) Assane Diatta | Malisheva | 2 |
~65 other players
