= Baran Valley =

Region near Peja, Kosovo

Baran Valley Lugu i Baranit Баранска долина
- Etno-cultural and geographic region of Kosovo
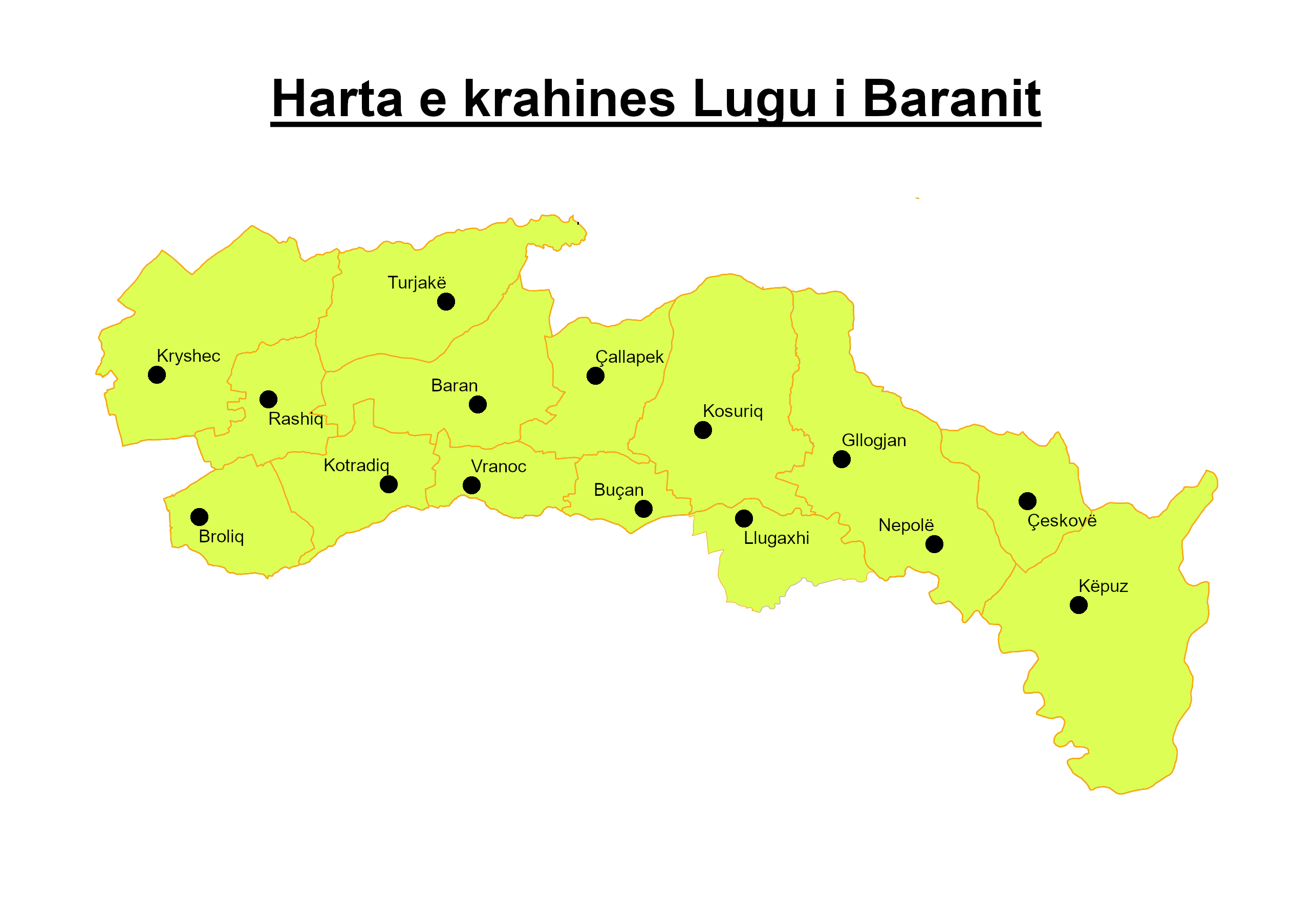
- Map of the region
- Location: Kosovo
- District: Pejë
- Municipality: Peja and Klina

Area
  - Total: 75 km^{2} (29 sq mi)

Population (2011)
  - Total: 10,112
  - Density: 130/km^{2} (350/sq mi)

The Baran Valley (Albanian: Lugu i Baranit) is an ethnographic and geographic province (Krahinë) situated on the Dukagjini plain. It is located on the basin of the Deçan Bistrica and divided into 15 villages.

== Geography ==
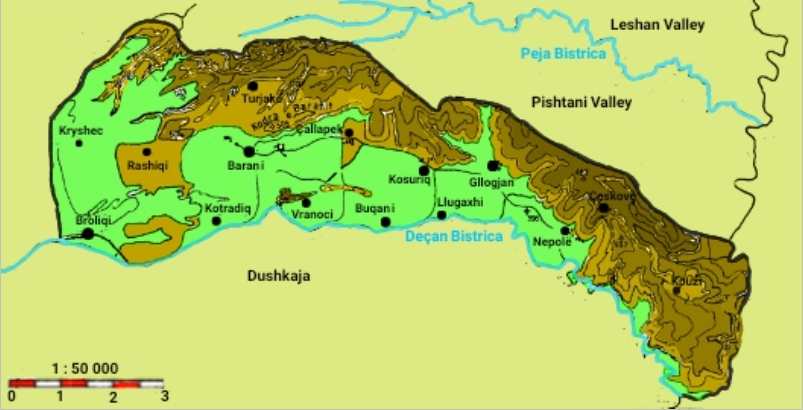
Geographic map of the Baran Valley

The Baran Valley is a geographic and ethnographic region of Kosovo located 10 km east of Peja. It is located in the region of Dukagjin with a surface area of 75 km^{2}. The region lies between the valleys of Leshan and Pishtan to the north, the Deçani Bistrica to the south, the White Drin in the east and the Accursed Mountains and Deçan Valley to the west. The region consists of 15 villages, 13 in the Peja municipality and 2 in the Klina municipality.

=== Terrain ===
The terrain of the Baran Valley is a mixture between hills and flatlands. The flatlands are mostly situated near the Deçani Bistrica, while the hills lie to the north and east. The tallest hills in the northern side are the hills of Duboçakë (522m) and Turjakë (503m). The hills in the east include the hills of Baran (499m), Çeskova (485m) and Kpuza (457m). The hill of Vranoc is another hill in the valley described by Mark Krasniqi as a "lonely island" compared to the surrounding flatlands. Due to erosion caused by the bistrica in the south, many gorges have also been formed near the river bank.

=== Hydrology ===
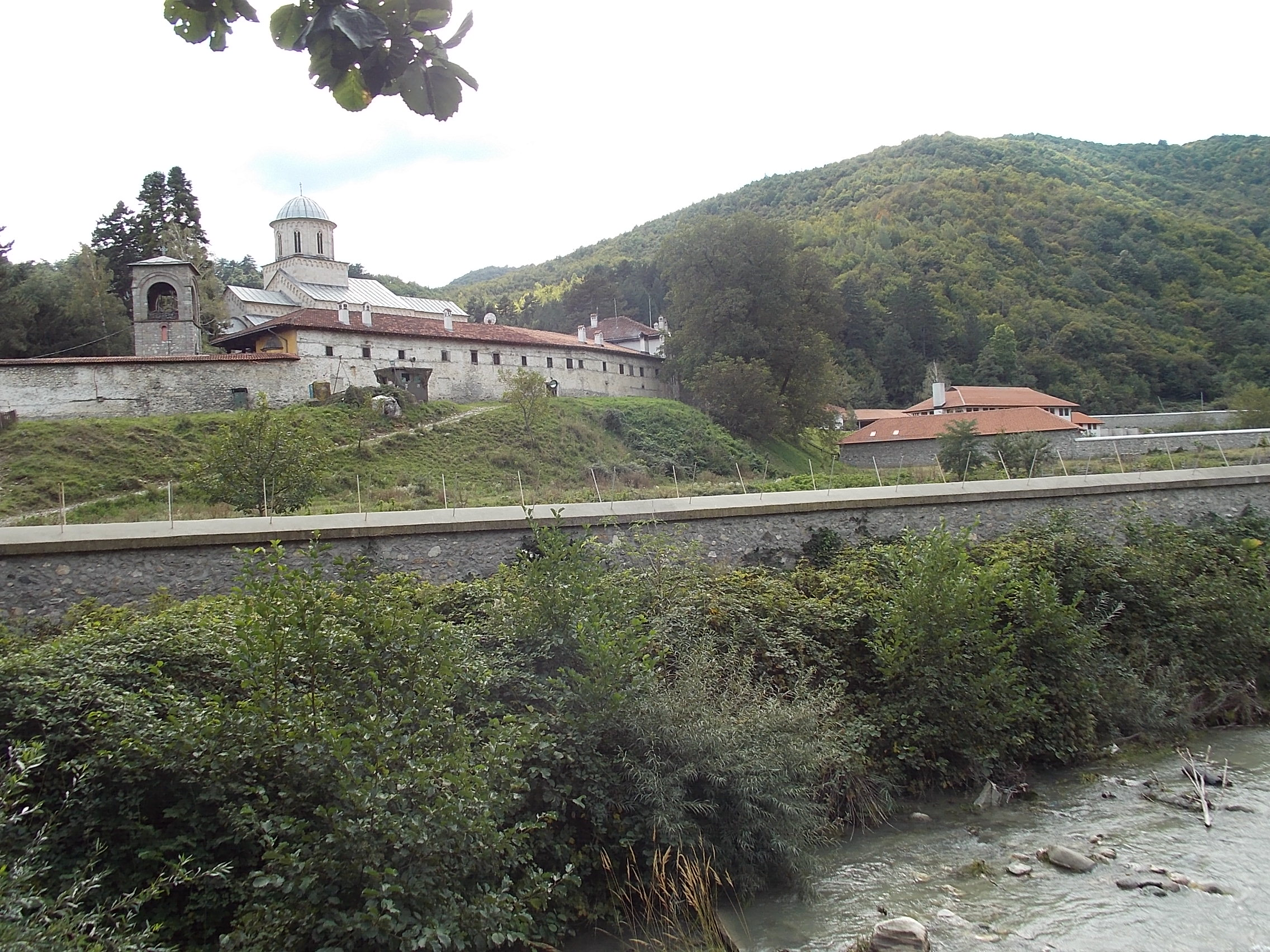
The Deçan Bistrica

The main river in the region is the Deçan Bistrica, referred to simply as the "bistrica" by the locals, which flows through the southern parts of the region. It starts in the mountains of Deçan and Reka and continues to flow until it reaches the White Drin, situated on the east of the region. The river has several branches, the most notable of which is the Kozhnjer Bistrica. The Deçan Bistrica also forms several streams which take the names of the villages near which they are located, such as the Stream of Dashinoc, Bardhaniq, Broliq and Kosuriq. There are also several streams in the hills of the valley, including the Stream of Gjesë, Beleg, Zall (sand stream) and Rupa.

=== Climate ===
The climate and weather of the city of Peja apply to its nearby neighbors, including the Baran Valley. The region has an Oceanic climate.

Climate data for Peja and Baran (1961–1990)
Month	Jan	Feb	Mar	Apr	May	Jun	Jul	Aug	Sep	Oct	Nov	Dec	Year
Record high °C (°F)	15.4 (59.7)	22.6 (72.7)	25.0 (77.0)	28.0 (82.4)	31.5 (88.7)	35.8 (96.4)	38.2 (100.8)	35.9 (96.6)	34.1 (93.4)	28.3 (82.9)	22.9 (73.2)	18.9 (66.0)	38.2 (100.8)
Mean daily maximum °C (°F)	2.8 (37.0)	6.0 (42.8)	10.9 (51.6)	16.1 (61.0)	20.9 (69.6)	24.1 (75.4)	26.5 (79.7)	26.4 (79.5)	22.7 (72.9)	16.9 (62.4)	10.1 (50.2)	4.5 (40.1)	15.7 (60.3)
Daily mean °C (°F)	−0.5 (31.1)	2.1 (35.8)	6.4 (43.5)	11.2 (52.2)	15.9 (60.6)	19.0 (66.2)	21.1 (70.0)	20.8 (69.4)	17.2 (63.0)	11.8 (53.2)	5.9 (42.6)	1.2 (34.2)	11.1 (52.0)
Mean daily minimum °C (°F)	−3.6 (25.5)	−1.5 (29.3)	2.0 (35.6)	6.1 (43.0)	10.3 (50.5)	13.3 (55.9)	15.0 (59.0)	14.8 (58.6)	11.5 (52.7)	6.8 (44.2)	2.3 (36.1)	−1.8 (28.8)	6.3 (43.3)
Record low °C (°F)	−24.8 (−12.6)	−19.3 (−2.7)	−13.6 (7.5)	−3.8 (25.2)	0.6 (33.1)	3.5 (38.3)	6.7 (44.1)	5.2 (41.4)	−1.2 (29.8)	−4.8 (23.4)	−15.3 (4.5)	−15.2 (4.6)	−24.8 (−12.6)
Average precipitation mm (inches)	85.9 (3.38)	71.5 (2.81)	65.2 (2.57)	67.2 (2.65)	68.2 (2.69)	53.0 (2.09)	54.7 (2.15)	48.0 (1.89)	52.1 (2.05)	75.3 (2.96)	118.2 (4.65)	91.4 (3.60)	850.7 (33.49)
Average precipitation days (≥ 0.1 mm)	12.0	12.3	11.3	11.5	13.0	13.2	9.9	8.7	8.1	9.5	12.3	13.3	135.1
Average snowy days	8.1	6.0	3.7	0.6	0.0	0.0	0.0	0.0	0.0	0.1	2.0	6.5	27.0
Average relative humidity (%)	81	75	68	63	64	64	60	60	67	73	81	83	70
Mean monthly sunshine hours	69.5	93.3	143.0	172.0	207.8	257.7	274.3	264.9	206.3	152.6	86.8	55.3	1,983.5
Source: Republic Hydrometeorological Service of Serbia

=== Pedology ===
The region of Baran has a similar sediment and ground structure to its neighboring valleys. Some parts of the region however have a different type of ground structure from others. The ground of Baran consists mostly of vertisol, alluvium and podzol. Alluvium, located near the river banks and in the flatlands, is used by the people of Baran for agriculture. Podzol makes up the ground near the hills and is not cultivated. Vertisol is located in the lands between Kosuriq and Kpuz. Most of the soil composition was brought to the valley through the Bistrica, with erosion also playing an important role in the pedology of the region.

=== Flora ===
The Baran valley has a large ecosystem of plants which includes shrubs, wild scrubs and juniper plants. The region has a vast variety of forests including oak (Quercus), hornbeams (Carpinus), common hazel (Corylus avellana), black elder (Sambucus nigra), common spindle (Euonymus europaeus) and cornelian cherry (Cornus mas).

=== Fauna ===
The Baran valley has a poor fauna, mostly dominated by livestock. Despite having significant presence in the first half of the 19th century, many wild animals such as wolves and boars are rarely found in the region, while foxes mostly live in caves. The most widespread wild animals are rabbits, hedgehogs and badgers. The Baran valley also hosts several bird species, including ravens, crows, wild ducks, storks, swallows, cuckoos, doves, sparrows, shrikes and song thrushes. In the Deçan Bistrica there is also a presence of trout, common babel, carp and eel.

== History ==
=== Ancient history ===
Up until the 1980s, the ancient history of the Baran Valley was unknown due to the lack of archeological excavations in the area. Excavations in the early 1980s revealed a series of ancient Illyrian tools and weapons, showing evidence of ancient settlements in the area. During the Roman period the region was likely part of the municipium of Siparantum (Peja).

=== Medieval history ===
In the medieval period most mentions of the region come from chrysobulls of the Serbian Empire. Under the rule of the Nemanja dynasty several monasteries and churches were built. Stefan Dušan, whose possession stretched to Albania and Northern Greece, gave the Deçan monastery large control over the region. Under Stefan Uroš several villages were given to the Hilandar monastery in the region of Peja, including the "two-Vraniks", Upper Vranoc and Lower Vranoc (modern-day Vranoc) during 1292–1303. The villages of Çeskovë, Çallapek, Gllogjan, Kosuriq and Nepole are mentioned in a document written by Stefan Dečanski in 1327, while Broliq and Kryshec are first mentioned in the Dečani chrysobulls in 1330. Under both Serbian and Ottoman rule, the inhabitants of the region had to pay heavy taxes.

=== Modern history ===
The history of the Baran valley from the 15th to mid-19th century is the most undocumented period in the history of the region. Baran was under the control of the Vranoc Bajraktar and the locals continued to pay large taxes similar to the Middle Ages. The region played a significant during the League of Prizren, with several members such as Rexhë Bajraktari and Ali Bajraktari, who also partook in the League of Peja, hailing from the region. Baran was included in a large battle that occurred on 11 July 1893 between the forces of the League of Peja commanded by Haxhi Zeka, against the Ottoman army commanded by Mustafa Çerkez Pasha. Despite heavy resistance, the Albanian forces retreated.

After the First World War the region fell under the control of the Kingdom of Yugoslavia which continued oppression in the region. Several incidents occurred during the Interwar period and Second World War, with the bloodiest incident occurring in February 1937, during a local election. During this time a radical party was in control of the area, carrying out several violations towards the people of Baran, who sought out to vote the non-violent Democratic party. The Radical party, backed up by the Yugoslav Gendarmerie, planned ro rig the election by guarding the voting center and intimidating the locals. The tension ultimately culminated in a bloody shootout where the gendarmerie fired at the Albanians, killing 7 and injuring 30. During the incident, several Albanians snuck into the voting center and ripped several lists and votes for the Radical party. This led to the election being won by the Radical party, with Manojlo Manojlović being elected as mayor.

The region also played an important role in the Kachak Movement, with several hundred fighters hailing from the area. Between 8 and 9 August 1921 a battle occurred between the villages Rosuja and Nepole when the gendarmerie ambushed a group of Kachaks. The battle resulted in the deaths of 30 Kachaks and 3 Yugoslav troops.

Several villages in the region were also the cite of several engagements during the Kosovo conflict. The village of Çallapek was the sight of two attacks by the Kosovo Liberation Army (KLA) in 1997, one on 13 October when a police station was attacked, and another on 20 October as a part of a series of attacks which also included the stations of Baballoq and Kliçina.

== Demographics ==
The earliest documents on the population of the Baran Valley are the Deçani chrysobulls which mention a large Serbian population together with a Vlach family made up of the father, Radoslav, and his sons, Miloš, Dragoš and Radoslav. Most of the vlachs in the Deçani chrysobulls however are considered to be Albanian. The Ottoman defter of 1485 stated that most of the Baran valley, as well as the surrounding villages of Peja, were a mixture of Albanians and Slavs. This can also been seen in the defter of 1582-1583 where 85 villages had a mixed Albanian and Slavic anthroponomy.

According to the 2011 consensus, the villages of Baran had a combined population of 10,112 made up of 9,880 Albanians, 98 Egyptians, 89 Romas, 23 Bosniaks, 7 Ashkalis and 15 unknown.

== Culture ==
=== Social relations ===
The families in the Baran Valley were usually patriarchal, where the man of the house would make most of the decisions, however in recent times families are more contemporary. Families were large and made up of dozens of members which lived together in one home. The largest family was that of Tahir Smajli in Nepolë, which in 1971 had 45 members which lived in the same home. The locals also followed a series of traditional social norms. The traditional Albanian way of greeting guests is practiced in the region. Another norm is the "Upria" which is the help towards families without workers. The region also used to have its own marriage norms, where a girl was not allowed to be engaged to man until she finishes the eighth grade, and that for a girls hand in marriage the price could not exceed 5 million old dinars. The tax norm that was followed in Baran was the "për tim" (for smoke). Each village had its individual government, where the leader was the village chief. In the parliament when problems occurred, each household had equal rights.

==== Tribal factions ====
The region of Baran had several notable Albanian tribes (fis). The tribe with the most presence were the Berisha, with 266 households, the second were the Krasniqi with 254, followed by the Gashi with 195, Shala with 85, Thaçi with 48, Kelmendi with 47, Bytyqi and Morina with 15, Kabashi with 10 and Mirëditë with 9.

=== Sport ===
Baran has an association football team, KF Rilindja 1974, previously known as KF Lugu i Baranit, which plays in the fourth tier of Kosovar football. The club uses to play in the First Football League of Kosovo. The team plays in the Baran Sports Field, a 500-person capacity stadium.

== Settlements ==
Baran is composed of 15 villages, which are:

- Nepolë
- Gllogjan
- Llugaxhi
- Kosuriq
- Buçan
- Vranoc
- Çallapek
- Turjakë
- Baran
- Kotradiq
- Rashiq
- Kryshec
- Broliq
- Këpuz
- Çeskovë

The village of Rosulë, despite culturally being a part of the region, geographically lies in the Pishtan Valley.

== Notable people ==
- Sali Çekaj, KLA general born in the village of Broliq.
- Ali Berisha, former mayor of Peja and medical doctor born in Çallapek.
- Sylë Rexha, 18th century feudal lord and eponymous founder of the Syle Rexha Tower House, born in Vranoc.
- Rexhë Bajraktari, Albanian rebel of the League of Prizren
- Ali Bajraktari, member of the League of Peja and participant of the oath swearing at Verrat e Llukës.
- Harry Bajraktari, successful Kosovar-American businessman.

== Sources ==
- Krasniqi, Mark (1984). Lugu i Baranit: Monografi Etno-gjeografike [The Baran Valley: Etno-geographic monograph]. Pristina: Academy of Science and Art of Kosovo.
