= Gabela, Bosnia and Herzegovina =

Village in Bosnia and Herzegovina

Gabela
- Village
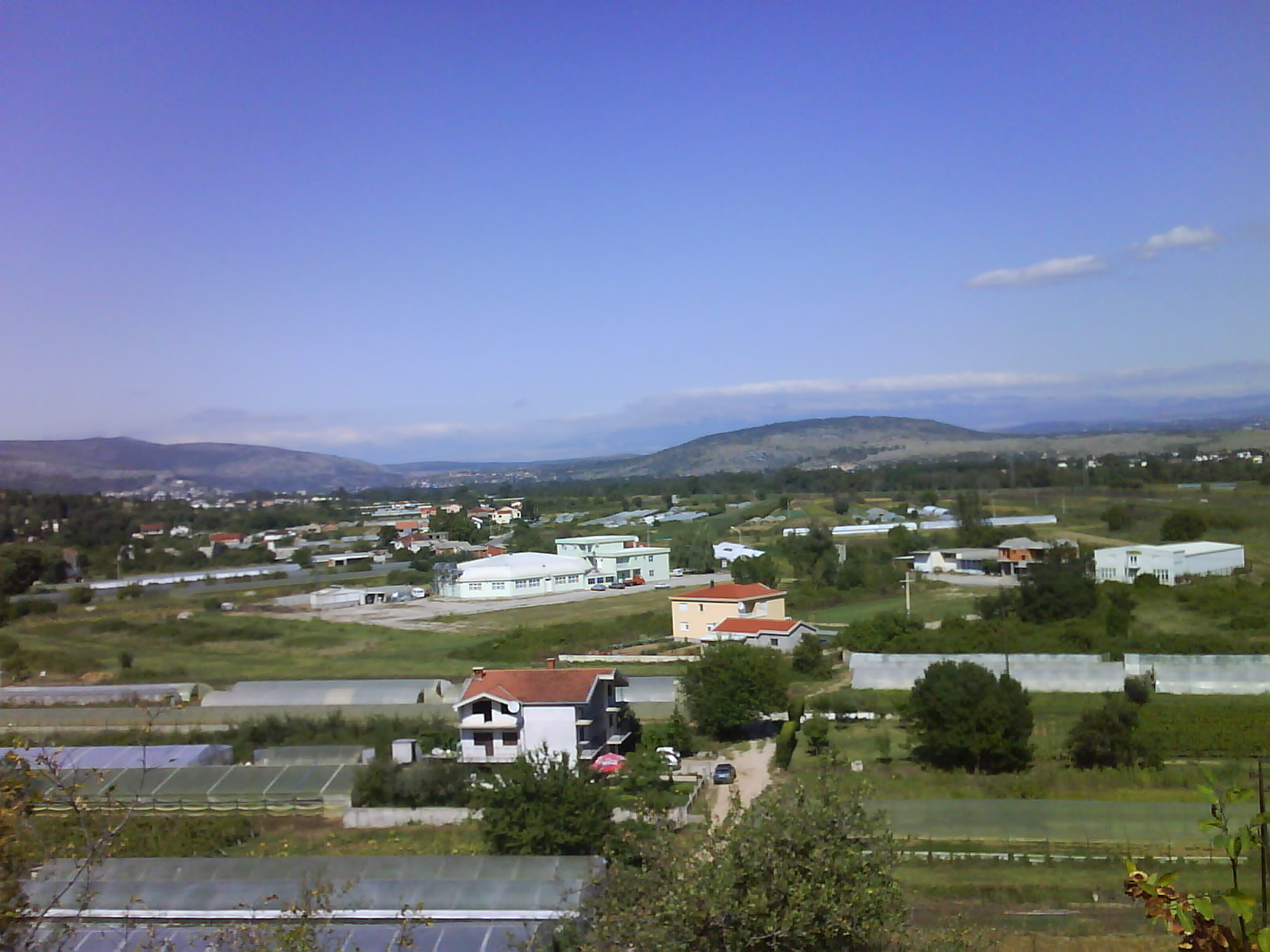
- Gabela

- Location within Bosnia and Herzegovina
- Country: Bosnia and Herzegovina
- Entity: Federation of Bosnia and Herzegovina
- Canton: Herzegovina-Neretva
- Municipality: Čapljina

Area
  - Total: 6.77 sq mi (17.53 km^{2})

Population (2013)
  - Total: 2,315
  - Density: 342.0/sq mi (132.1/km^{2})
- Time zone: UTC+1 (CET)
  - Summer (DST): UTC+2 (CEST)

Gabela is a village in southern Bosnia and Herzegovina, 5 kilometres south of Čapljina and 4 kilometers from Metković, in Croatia. It is situated in the navigable lower course of the Neretva, off the major road linking the coast with the mountainous hinterland.

== Etymology ==
The name Gabela could derive from the Arabic word "alcabala" (qabāla) which means a "contract" or "tax". Kabalá, qabala, qabalah, kabbalah, in Hebrew literally means “something received”.

== History ==
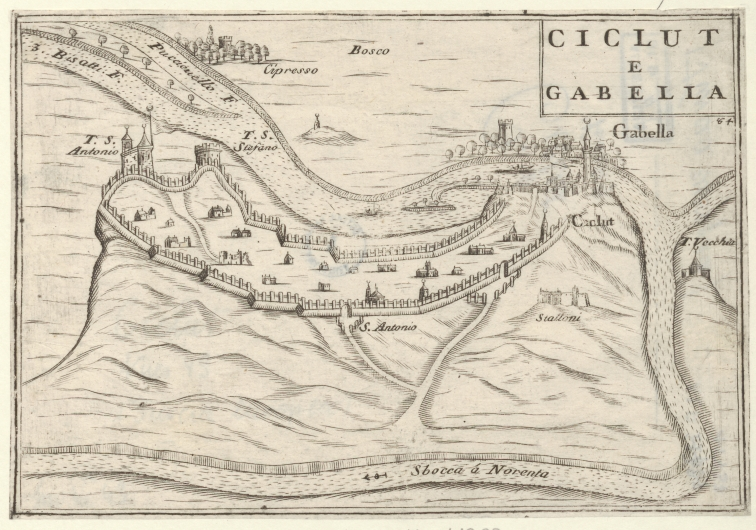
Drijeva on an old hand-drawn map.

According to history, Gabela was first mentioned in a contract between the Serbian ruler Nemanja and the Republic of Ragusa as Drijeva (the old Serbo-Croatian word for ship or ferry). Up to the end of the 12th century it was called Drijevo and was an important centre for the trade between the Bosnian kings and Dubrovnik, in which goods were flowing from Dubrovnik and Republic of Venice: salt, oil, wine, fabrics, glass, weapons and luxury goods, and from the inside: wood, meet, corn, wool, honey and cheese, until it became a Dubrovnik colony known as Osobljane.

Drijeva rapidly became a port for slave trading, along with Brštanik, and this was sanctioned by law. This can be seen in the archives of Dubrovnik, where the Mercantum Narenti (Forum Narenti) is mentioned, and in the Statute of Dubrovnik of 1272, where in the sixth book there is a series of passages (42-52) dealing with the social status of slaves.

In the 14th century the Bosnian kings began to implement forceful measures against this "trade in human flesh on the Neretva" and under pressure from them in 1400 the Dubrovnik Senate banned the trade in human lives, and the transport of slaves in Ragusan ships in 1416 under the threat of six months imprisonment in the underground dungeons in Dubrovnik in the Rector's Palace in Dubrovnik, as well as a fine. Under the name Gabela (it. Gabella - "customs house") the town was mentioned in 1399.

The Ottomans occupied the town in 1529 and built the Sedislam fortress on the right-hand bank of the Neretva. It became the center of the Gabela captany (organized before 1561). In 1537 Gabela becomes part of Nevesinje kadiluk.

In the middle of 17th century Ali-Pasha Čengić rebuilt and reinforced the fort, which was also referred as Novi grad (transl. New town). In 1693 it was conquered by the Venetians who repaired the Ottoman buildings, especially in Novi grad and Džerzelez fortress, but they destroyed these buildings again when the Ottomans attacked and recaptured it in 1715. In 1718 the Ottomans themselves rebuilt part of the settlement. The fragments of the walls and towers, the ruins of two churches, as well as Careva džamija (transl. the Sultan's Mosque) which the Venetians converted into a church of Sveti Stjepan (transl. the St. Stephen), and added stone sculptures of lions, the symbol of the Venetian Republic, are all still visible.

Until 1878 it was an important border town between Bosnia Eyalet in Ottoman Empire and Dalmatia as part of Venice and later Austria-Hungary, but the role of Gabela as the border-fort would periodically also befell on town of Počitelj.

Since 1945, Gabela is a village in Čapljina municipality in Bosnia and Herzegovina about 3 km from the border with Croatia on the right bank of the Neretva river.

In the 1980s, a Mexican author named Roberto Salinas Price published a work called Homer's blind audience: an essay on the Iliad's geographical prerequisites for the site of Ilios in which he claimed Gabela was the location of Troy. This was met with quite some interest in Yugoslavia at the time, and the local scientific community was slow to react to this pseudoscientific claim.

Since the breakup of Yugoslavia in the early 1990s and the border becoming an international border, Gabela is an important point of transit, with a rail road passing through it.

During the Bosnian War in the 1990s, Gabela camp was a prison camp run by the Croatian Community of Herzeg-Bosnia and Croatian Defence Council. The camp consisted of detention facilities and a munitions warehouse. "Outside observers were not allowed to visit Gabela until August 1993. At this time the ICRC registered 1,100 inmates."

== Demographics ==
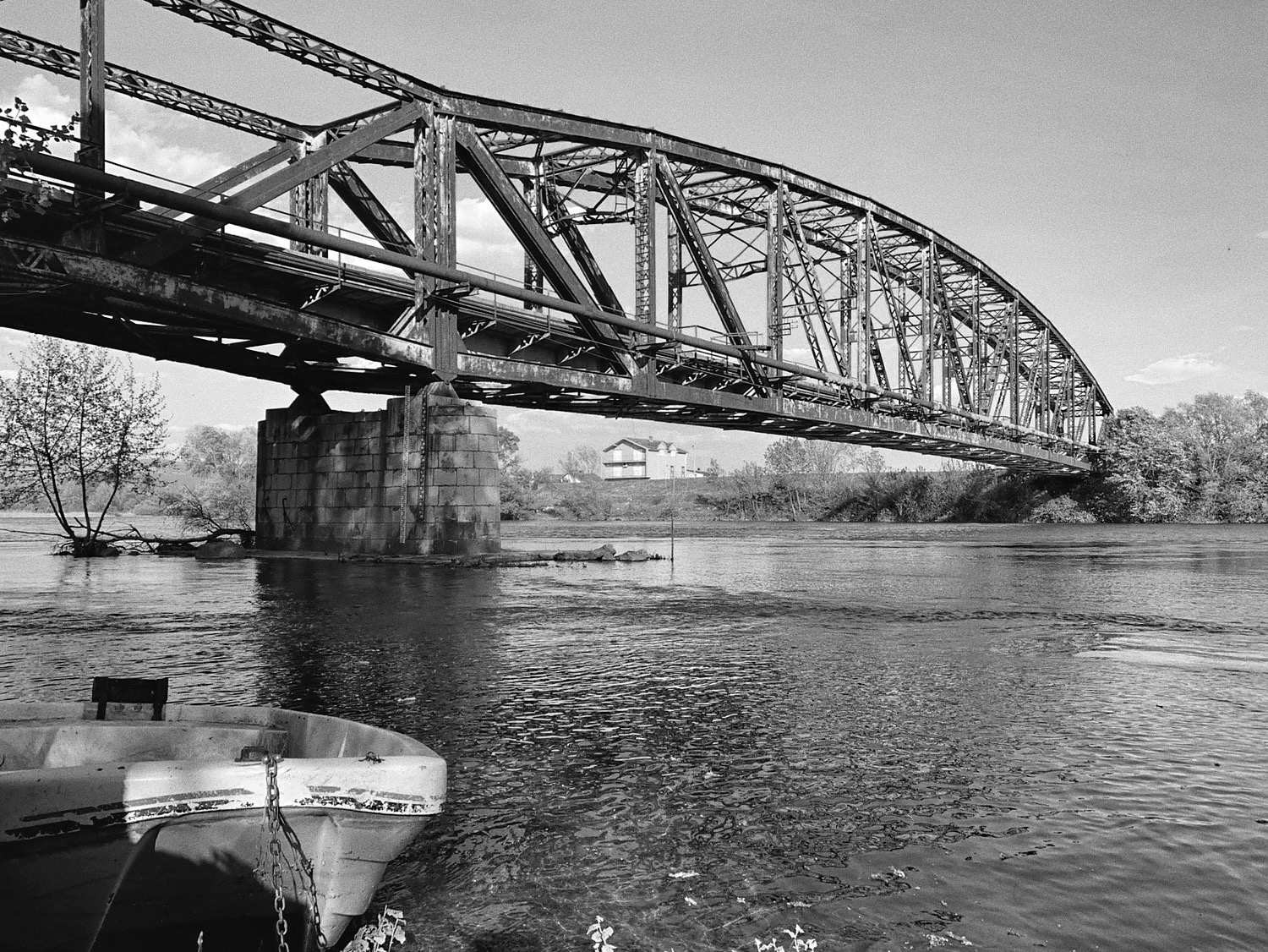
Gabela bridge

According to the 2013 census, its population was 2,315.

Ethnicity in 2013
Ethnicity	Number	Percentage
Croats	2,234	96.5%
Serbs	68	2.9%
Bosniaks	6	0.2%
other/undeclared	8	0.3%
Total	2,315	100%

== Sports ==
Local football club NK GOŠK has spent a few seasons on Bosnia and Herzegovina's top level and play their home games at the Stadium Perica-Pero Pavlović.
