= Adnan Haxhaj =

Kosovar-Albanian footballer

Personal information
- Date of birth: 16 September 1988 (age 38)
- Place of birth: Vushtrri, SFR Yugoslavia
- Height: 1.85 m (6 ft 1 in)
- Position: Centre back

Team information
- Current team: Feronikeli 74

Youth career
- Vushtrria
- Trepça

Senior career*
Years	Team	Apps	(Gls)
2009–2015	Prishtina		
2015–2016	Vllaznia Shkodër	6	(0)
2016	Llapi	6	(0)
2016–2017	Liria Prizren	2	(0)
2017–2018	Drenica	10	(0)
2018–2019	Ferizaj	14	(0)
2019–2021	Besa Pejë		
2021	KEK		
2021–2022	Vëllaznimi		
2022	Phoenix Banjë		
2022–2023	Feronikeli 74	6	(0)
- * Club domestic league appearances and goals as of 15 June 2024

Adnan Haxhaj (born 16 September 1988) is a Kosovar–Albanian former professional footballer who played as a centre back.

== Career ==
Born in Vushtrria, Haxhaj started his youth career for Vushtrria and later joined Trepça where he made his professional debut.

In 2019, Haxhaj joined KF Besa Pejë.

== Career statistics ==
=== Club ===
As of 20 February 2018

Club	Season	League			Cup		Europe		Other		Total	
Club	Season	Division	Apps	Goals	Apps	Goals	Apps	Goals	Apps	Goals	Apps	Goals
FC Prishtina	2013–14	Superleague of Kosovo	21	2	?	?	—		—		21	2
FC Prishtina	2014–15	Superleague of Kosovo	19	0	?	?	—		—		19	?
FC Prishtina	Total		40	2	?	?	—		—		40	2
Vllaznia Shkodër	2015–16	Albanian Superliga	1	0	0	0	—		—		1	0
Vllaznia Shkodër	Total		1	0	0	0	—		—		1	0
Career total			41	2	0	0	—		—		41	2

== Honours ==
Prishtina

- Superleague of Kosovo (2): 2011–12, 2012–13
- Kosovar Cup (1): 2012–13
- Kosovar Supercup (1): 2012–13

Feronikeli

- First League of Kosovo (1): 2022–23
