= Valdet Shoshi =

Kosovar manager

Personal information
- Full name: Valdet Shoshi
- Date of birth: 9 September 1964 (age 62)
- Place of birth: Peja, SFR Yugoslavia
- Position: Left-back

Senior career*
Years	Team	Apps	(Gls)
–1990	Prishtina		
1991	MFK Vítkovice	1	(0)

Managerial career
- 2004–2005: Besa Pejë
- 2005–2007: Drenica
- 2008: Besa Pejë
- 2010–2013: Besa Pejë
- 2014: Besa Pejë
- 2015–2016: Drenica
- 2019–2020: Istogu
- 2022: Dardania
- 2022: Rilindja 1974
- * Club domestic league appearances and goals

Valdet Shoshi (born 9 September 1964) is a Kosovan professional football coach and former player.

== Playing career ==
He came to MFK Vítkovice from Prishtina. In the Czechoslovak First League, he played one full match on June 16, 1991, against Slovan Bratislava.

== Coaching career ==
Since 2004, Shoshi was the head coach of Besa Pejë several times including in the 2004–05 Superleague season when they were crowned champions for the first time.

In 2019, he became the head coach of Istogu.

== Honours ==
=== Manager ===
Besa Pejë

- Kosovo Superleague: 2004–05
- Kosovar Cup: 2004–05, 2010–11
