= Hekuran Berisha =

Kosovan footballer (born 2005)

Personal information
- Date of birth: 3 October 2005 (age 21)
- Place of birth: Pejë, UN-administered Kosovo
- Height: 1.88 m (6 ft 2 in)
- Position: Forward

Team information
- Current team: Dinamo City
- Number: 29

Youth career
- –2024: Dukagjini

Senior career*
Years	Team	Apps	(Gls)
2024–2025	Dukagjini	37	(11)
2025–	Dinamo City	12	(3)
2026	→ Dukagjini (loan)	18	(5)

International career^{‡}
2024–	Kosovo U21	15	(3)
- * Club domestic league appearances and goals as of 30 September 2026 ‡ National team caps and goals as of 24 September 2026

Hekuran Berisha (born 3 October 2005) is a Kosovan professional footballer who plays as a forward for Albanian Kategoria Superiore club Dinamo City.

== Club career ==
=== Dukagjini ===
Berisha began his career at Dukagjini, where he was gradually promoted to the first team during the second half of the 2023–24 season. On 22 February 2024, he was named in Dukagjini's first-team squad for the first time as a substitute in a Kosovo Superleague match against Liria Prizren. After being an unused substitute in eight matches, he made his debut for Dukagjini on 18 May 2024 in a 3–2 away defeat to Feronikeli, coming on as a substitute at the start of the second half in place of Iran Júnior.

=== Dinamo City ===
Following a season in which he scored 11 league goals, Berisha joined Albanian club Dinamo City on 19 June 2025. He scored his first goal for the club on 14 August, netting in the 111th minute of extra time in a 3–1 victory over Hajduk Split in the second leg of the 2025–26 UEFA Conference League third qualifying round. The win secured Dinamo a 4–3 aggregate victory and a place in the play-off round.

==== Loan to Dukagjini ====
On 1 February 2026, Berisha returned to Dukagjini on loan from Dinamo City. He scored the winning goal in the 2025–26 Kosovar Cup final against FC Ferizaj on 21 May, striking from near the halfway line to secure a 2–1 victory and the trophy for Dukagjini.

==== Return from loan ====
Following the conclusion of his loan spell, Berisha returned to Dinamo City ahead of the 2026–27 season. During the 2026–27 UEFA Conference League qualifying rounds, he scored twice, finding the net against Astana and Aluminij. Dinamo went on to eliminate Astana, Aluminij and Auda to reach the play-off round, where their campaign ended with elimination by Pafos.

== Honours ==
Dinamo City

- Albanian Supercup: 2025

Dukagjini

- Kosovar Cup: 2026
