= Arbnor Muja =

Albanian footballer (born 1998)

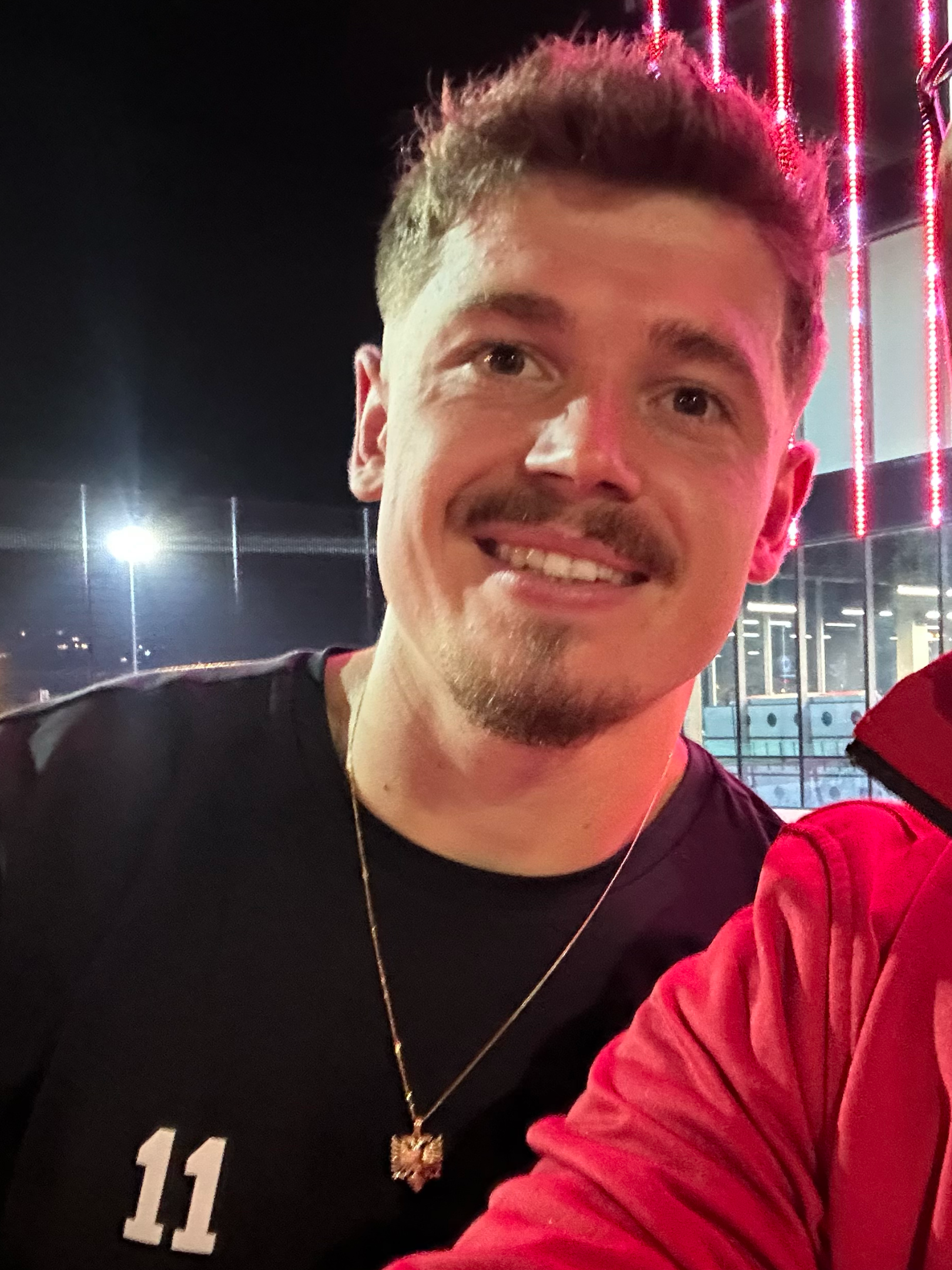
- Muja in 2023

Personal information
- Date of birth: 29 November 1998 (age 27)
- Place of birth: Mitrovica, FR Yugoslavia
- Height: 1.79 m (5 ft 10 in)
- Position: Winger

Team information
- Current team: Sint-Truiden

Youth career
- 2006–2015: Bardhi
- 2015–2016: Trepça

Senior career*
Years	Team	Apps	(Gls)
2016–2017	Trepça	4	(0)
2017–2018	Trepça '89	2	(0)
2018–2019	Eintracht Braunschweig II	17	(7)
2019–2021	Skënderbeu Korçë	9	(1)
2020–2021	→ Trepça '89 (loan)	42	(9)
2021–2022	Drita	20	(4)
2022–2024	Antwerp	50	(8)
2024–2026	Samsunspor	46	(4)
2025–2026	→ Sint-Truiden (loan)	26	(6)
2026–	Sint-Truiden	0	(0)

International career^{‡}
2018–2019	Kosovo U21	6	(0)
2023–	Albania	5	(0)
- * Club domestic league appearances and goals as of 31 May 2026 ‡ National team caps and goals as of 21 November 2023

Arbnor Muja (born 29 November 1998) is a professional footballer who plays as a winger for Belgian Pro League club Sint-Truiden. Born in Kosovo, he plays for the Albania national team.

== Club career ==
=== Eintracht Braunschweig II ===
On 15 August 2018, Muja signed a two-year contract with Oberliga Niedersachsen club Eintracht Braunschweig II. Seventeen days later, he made his debut against Arminia Hannover after being named in the starting line-up and scored his side's second goal during a 3–3 home draw. One month after debut, he was named as a first team substitute for the first time in the 2018–19 Lower Saxony Cup quarter-finals against SV Drochtersen/Assel.

=== Skënderbeu Korçë ===
On 31 August 2019, Muja signed a two-year contract with Kategoria Superiore club Skënderbeu Korçë. Fourteen days later, he made his debut in a 3–1 away defeat against Tirana after coming on as a substitute in the 41st minute in place of injured Gjergji Muzaka.

==== Return to Trepça '89 as loan ====
On 31 January 2020, Muja joined as loan to Kosovo Superleague club Trepça '89. One month later, he made his debut in a 3–0 away defeat against Feronikeli after being named in the starting line-up.

=== Drita ===
On 16 June 2021, Muja signed a three-year contract with Kosovo Superleague club Drita. On 8 July 2021, he made his debut with Drita in the 2021–22 UEFA Europa Conference League first qualifying round against the Montenegrin side Dečić after being named in the starting line-up, and assists in his side's second goal during a 2–1 home win.

=== Antwerp ===
On 28 July 2022, Belgian First Division A club Antwerp reached an agreement with Drita for the transfer of Muja and this deal was made a few minutes after Antwerp defeated Drita in the second leg of the 2022–23 UEFA Europa Conference League second qualifying round. Eight days later, the club confirmed that Muja's transfer was permanent and he received squad number 11. Antwerp reportedly paid a €400 thousand transfer fee, becoming the most expensive transfer in the history of the Kosovo Superleague. His debut with Antwerp came on 2 October in a 2–1 away defeat against Kortrijk after coming on as a substitute in the 45th minute in place of Koji Miyoshi.

Muja won the Belgian league and cup double with Royal Antwerp in his first season at the club, first seeing off Mechelen 2–0 in the 2023 Belgian Cup final, before edging out Racing Genk on the final day of the league season, drawing 2–2 away to their title rivals thanks to a 94th-minute equaliser from captain Toby Alderweireld.

It was Antwerp's first league crown in 66 years, having last lifted the title in 1957.

=== Samsunspor ===
On 9 February 2024, Samsunspor announced the signing of Muja on a three-and-a-half-year contract. He scored on his Süper Lig debut three days later, in a 2–0 home win over Antalyaspor, after coming on as a second-half substitute.

=== Sint-Truiden ===
On 27 August 2025, Muja was loaned out to Sint-Truiden for the 2025–26 season. On 14 August 2026, Muja returned to Sint-Truiden on a permanent basis.

== International career ==
=== Kosovo ===
On 4 October 2018, Muja received a call-up from Kosovo U21 for the 2019 UEFA European Under-21 Championship qualification match against Israel U21, and made his debut after coming on as a substitute at 64th minute in place of Muharrem Jashari.

On 17 March 2023, Muja received a call-up from Kosovo for the UEFA Euro 2024 qualifying matches against Israel and Andorra, but he was an unused substitute in these matches. In June 2023, Muja received again a call-up from Kosovo for the UEFA Euro 2024 qualifying matches against Romania and Belarus, but he declined the call-up as he had not received a guarantee that he will start in these matches.

=== Albania ===
On 15 August 2023, Muja obtained the Albanian passport, making him eligible to play for the Albania national team. Head of the Department of Public Relations of the Albanian Football Association, Andi Verçani confirmed two days later through an interview for Koha Ditore that Muja will be called up by Albania in September 2023 for the UEFA Euro 2024 qualifying matches against Czech Republic and Poland. On 1 September 2023, he formalizes the decision and accept their call-up for the UEFA Euro 2024 qualifying matches against Czech Republic and Poland. He made his debut in the match drawn 1–1 at home to the Czechs.

== Personal life ==
Muja was born in Mitrovica, FR Yugoslavia and is the younger brother Ardian Muja is a footballer who plays as a right winger for the Kosovan club Prishtina, and have been teammates in the Kosovan clubs Trepça (before 2017) and Trepça '89 (2017–2018, 2021–2022).

== Career statistics ==
=== Club ===
As of 11 November 2023

Appearances and goals by club, season and competition
Club	Season	League			National cup		Continental		Other		Total	
Club	Season	Division	Apps	Goals	Apps	Goals	Apps	Goals	Apps	Goals	Apps	Goals
Trepça	2016–17	Kosovo Superleague	4	0	—		—		—		4	0
Trepça '89	2017–18	Kosovo Superleague	2	0	—		—		—		2	0
Eintracht Braunschweig II	2018–19	Oberliga Niedersachsen	17	7	—		—		—		17	7
Skënderbeu Korçë	2019–20	Albanian Superliga	9	1	2	1	—		—		11	2
Trepça '89 (loan)	2019–20	Kosovo Superleague	11	1	—		—		—		11	1
Trepça '89 (loan)	2020–21	Kosovo Superleague	31	8	1	0	—		—		32	8
Trepça '89 (loan)	Total		42	9	1	0	—		—		43	9
Drita	2021–22	Kosovo Superleague	20	4	3	2	4 (Note: Appearances in UEFA Europa Conference League)	0	—		27	6
Drita	2022–23	Kosovo Superleague	—		—		4	2	—		4	2
Drita	Total		20	4	3	2	8	2	—		31	8
Antwerp	2022–23	Belgian Pro League	21	3	6	1	—		6	0	33	4
Antwerp	2023–24	Belgian Pro League	14	4	1	0	4 (Note: Appearances in UEFA Champions League)	1	1	0	20	5
Antwerp	Total		35	7	7	1	4	1	7	0	53	9
Samsunspor	2023–24	Süper Lig	0	0	0	0	—		0	0	0	0
Career total			129	28	13	4	12	3	7	0	161	35

=== International ===
As of match played 17 November 2023

Appearances and goals by national team and year
National team	Year	Apps	Goals
Albania	2023	5	0
Total		5	0

== Honours ==
Trepça '89

- Kosovar Supercup: 2017

Antwerp

- Belgian Pro League: 2022–23
- Belgian Cup: 2022–23
- Belgian Super Cup: 2023
