= Fiton Hajdari =

Kosovar professional footballer (born 1991)

Personal information
- Full name: Fiton Hajdari
- Date of birth: 19 September 1991 (age 35)
- Place of birth: Podujevo, Kosovo
- Height: 1.88 m (6 ft 2 in)
- Position: Left winger

Team information
- Current team: Vjosa
- Number: 11

Senior career*
Years	Team	Apps	(Gls)
2015–2018	Trepça 89	26	(11)
2018–2019	Llapi	17	(2)
2019–2022	Gjilani	94	(21)
2022–2023	Malisheva	24	(2)
2023–2024	Feronikeli	22	(2)
2024	Liria	0	(0)
2025–	Vjosa		
- * Club domestic league appearances and goals as of 15 June 2024

Fiton Hajdari (born 19 September 1991) is a Kosovar professional footballer who plays as a left-winger for Football Superleague of Kosovo club Feronikeli.

== Club career ==
=== Trepça '89 ===
Hajdari played with Trepça 89 in the Football Superleague of Kosovo in 2017, Kosovo started participating in the Champions League qualifications where Trepça 89 took part in these competitions, their opponent was Vikingur Gota from the Faroe Islands where they lost the first match with a score of 2:1 and the scorer in the 39th minute was Fiton Hajdari where scored a super goal to equalize the result.

=== Llapi ===
Hajdari was transferred to Llapi in the summer of 2018. During his debut in the Super League of Kosovo, his opponent was Drenica.

=== Gjilani ===
Hajdari was transferred to Gjilani in the winter of 2019, where he stayed with the Gjilan team for about three years.

=== Malisheva ===
Hajdari was transferred to the Malisheva team in the summer of 2022, where he stayed for only one year

=== Feronikeli ===
Hajdari moved to Feronikeli In July 2023 and made his debut in the first match against Pristina where they lost with a score of 3:1 and the only goal for his team was scored by Hajdari.
