= Armend =

Armend is an Albanian male given name meaning "golden mind". Notable people with this name include:

- Armend Alimi (born 1987), Macedonian football player
- Armend Dallku (born 1983), Albanian football coach and player
- Armend Halili (born 1997), Kosovan professional footballer
- Armend Kabashi (born 1995), Finnish football player
- Armend Mehaj (born 1981), Kosovar Albanian–Norwegian military officer
- Armend Muja (born 1981), Kosovar politician
- Armend Thaqi (born 1992), Kosovan football player
