= Fisnik Papuçi =

Kosovar footballer

Personal information
- Full name: Fisnik Papuçi
- Date of birth: 1 July 1983 (age 43)
- Place of birth: Peć, SFR Yugoslavia
- Height: 1.81 m (5 ft 11 1/2 in)
- Positions: Leftback; centerback

Senior career*
Years	Team	Apps	(Gls)
2001–2006	Besa Pejë	211	(10)
2006–2007	Elbasani	15	(0)
2008	Vëllaznimi	20	(1)
2008–2009	Jedinstvo Bijelo Polje	24	(1)
2009–2011	Hysi	39	(11)
2011–2013	Vëllaznimi	30	(0)
2013–2017	Besa Pejë	110	(8)
2017–2019	Gjilani	51	(1)

International career
2007–2010	Kosovo	2	(0)

Managerial career
- 2022–2023: Rilindja 1974
- 2023–2024: Deçani
- 2024–: Dardania
- * Club domestic league appearances and goals

Fisnik Papuçi (Serbo-Croatian: Fisnik Papuči) (born 1 July 1983) is a Kosovar former footballer and current football manager.

== Club career ==
Born in Peć (Pejë), Socialist Autonomous Province of Kosovo, SR Serbia, SFR Yugoslavia (modern Kosovo), Papuçi played as defender for KF Elbasani in the Albanian Superliga and FK Jedinstvo Bijelo Polje in the Montenegrin First League. In Kosovo he played with his home-town club SC Besa Pejë and also with KF Vëllaznimi and KF Hysi.

In July 2017, he joined Gjilani.

== International career ==
He was part of the Kosovo national football team in 2007 and 2010.
