= KF Bardhi =

Football club in Kosovo

- Full name: Klub Futbollistik Bardhi
- Founded: 1994; 31 years ago
- Ground: Stadiumi i Zhabarit
- Capacity: 1,000
- Chairman: Bardhec Seferi
- League: Mitrovica Regional Football League
Home colours	Away colours

Klubi Futbollistik Bardhi is a football club from Zhabar i Epërm, Mitrovicë, Kosovo. The club was founded in 1994 under the name KF Skënderbeu Zhabar but changed its name later. It competed in the Third League in the beginning of the 21st century.

KF Bardhi's focusses on developing youth talents. Many notable players were part of the club like Arbnor Muja, Ervin Kurti, Ardian Muja or Januz Miftari.

== History ==
=== KF Skënderbeu Zhabar (1994–2002) ===
The club was founded in 1994 by Bardhec Seferi, former footballer for Trepça, Liria, Dukagjini and Kosovo national team, where with the latter Seferi has played in the first match following the breakup of Yugoslavia. The club was known as KF Skënderbeu Zhabar until 2002. KF Skënderbeu competed in the Third League during 2000–2002.

=== KF Bardhi (2002–present) ===
In 2002, the club was named Bardhi meaning white in English, but it had another meaning that also coincides with the first four letters of his name. In 2020, KF Bardhi received financial help from the Municipality of Mitrovica. In 2022, former Bardhi player Arbnor Muja was sold to Antwerp. Therefore, the club received a percentage from the transfer fee.

== Stadium ==
The stadium is located in the village of Zhabar.

== Notable players ==
- (Albania) Arbnor Muja
- (Kosovo) Ardit Miftari
- (Kosovo) Januz Miftari
- (Kosovo) Ardian Muja
- (Serbia) Ervin Kurti

== See also ==
- List of football clubs in Kosovo
