= Leonat Vitija =

Kosovar footballer

Personal information
- Date of birth: 22 August 2000 (age 26)
- Place of birth: Pristina, Kosovo under UN administration
- Height: 1.87 m (6 ft 1 1/2 in)
- Position: Centre-back

Team information
- Current team: Tirana
- Number: 6

Youth career
- –2016: KEK
- 2016–2018: Prishtina

Senior career*
Years	Team	Apps	(Gls)
2018–2019	Prishtina	0	(0)
2018–2019	→ KEK (loan)	27	(2)
2019–2022	Skënderbeu	58	(0)
2022–2024	Drita	50	(2)
2024–2026	Prishtina	55	(4)
2026–	Tirana	6	(0)

International career^{‡}
2018	Kosovo U19	3	(0)
2019	Kosovo U21	2	(0)
- * Club domestic league appearances and goals as of 22 June 2026 ‡ National team caps and goals as of 20 April 2023

Leonat Vitija (born 22 August 2000) is a Kosovar footballer who plays as centre-back for Tirana .

== Honours ==
Prishtina

- Kosovar Cup: 2024–25
