= TyrT operon =

The tyrT operon is a series of genes encoding the tRNA for tyrosine in Escherichia coli. It is activated in response to amino acid starvation.

== Components ==
The tyrT operon consists of an upstream activation sequence, the gene for the tyrosine tRNA called tRNA_{1}^{Tyr}, and an RNA called rtT RNA which has an unknown function.

== Regulation ==
Transcription of the tyrT operon is activated by the stringent response. Binding of the FIS protein to the operon's upstream activation sequence tightly bends the DNA, promoting transcription.
