= Fatjon Bunjaku =

Kosovar footballer (2003–2026)

Personal information
- Full name: Fatjon Bunjaku
- Date of birth: 14 October 2003
- Place of birth: Samadrexhë, Kosovo
- Date of death: 7 June 2026 (aged 22)
- Place of death: Pristina, Kosovo
- Height: 1.80 m (5 ft 11 in)
- Position: Forward

Youth career
- –2018: El Clasico Football School
- 2018–2020: Trepça

Senior career*
Years	Team	Apps	(Gls)
2020–2022	Trepça		
2022	Zmaj Makarska	11	(5)
2022–2023	Trepça		
2023	Phoenix Banjë	26	(14)
2023–2024	Liria Prizren	16	(0)
2024	Gjilani	13	(0)
2024–2025	Malisheva	29	(5)
2025–2026	AF Elbasani	28	(3)

International career
2021	Kosovo U19	3	(0)
2024	Kosovo U21	4	(0)
- * Club domestic league appearances and goals

Fatjon Bunjaku (14 October 2003 – 7 June 2026) was a Kosovar professional footballer who played as a forward.

== Club career ==
=== Liria Prizren ===
On 13 June 2023, Bunjaku joined Kosovo Superleague side Liria Prizren. His debut with Liria Prizren came two months later against Ballkani after coming on as a substitute at 60th minute in place of Aprocius Petrus.

=== Gjilani ===
On 17 January 2024, Bunjaku joined Kosovo Superleague side Gjilani and received squad number 8. His debut with Gjilani came seventeen days later in the 2023–24 Kosovar Cup round of 16 against Prishtina after coming on as a substitute at 85th minute in place of Elvedin Herić. Seven days after debut, he made his league debut in a 1–1 away draw against Fushë Kosova after coming on as a substitute at 73rd minute in place of Edi Baša.

=== Malisheva ===
On 24 June 2024, Bunjaku joined Kosovo Superleague side Malisheva. His debut with Malisheva came seventeen days later in the 2024–25 UEFA Conference League first qualifying round against Budućnost Podgorica after coming on as a substitute at 79th minute in place of Ronald Sobowale. About a month after debut, Bunjaku scored his first goal for Malisheva in his third appearance for the club in a 1–1 home draw over Ferizaj in Kosovo Superleague.

=== AF Elbasani ===
On 26 July 2025, Bunjaku joined Albanian Kategoria Superiore side AF Elbasani. AF Elbasani reportedly paid a €50,000 transfer fee. His debut with AF Elbasani came on 23 August against Flamurtari after coming on as a substitute at 76th minute in place of José Gomes.

== International career ==
=== Under-19 ===
On 30 September 2021, Bunjaku was named as part of the Kosovo U19 squad for UEFA Euro 2022 qualifications. His debut with Kosovo U19 came six days later in the match against Norway U19 after being named in the starting line-up.

=== Under-21 and training with seniors ===
On 16 March 2024, Bunjaku received a call-up from Kosovo U21 for the UEFA Euro 2025 qualification match against Germany, and made his debut after being named in the starting line-up. On 9 January 2025, he received a call-up from Kosovo national senior team for a three-day training camp in Pristina.

== Death ==
On 7 June 2026, Bunjaku died following a traffic collision near Maxhunaj, Kosovo. Bunjaku, who was driving the vehicle, and two passengers were injured and transported for medical treatment. He died from his injuries at the University Clinical Center of Kosovo in Pristina, at age 22. An investigation into the circumstances of the collision was launched by the Regional Traffic Unit.

== Honours ==
Individual

- Kosovar Cup top scorer: 2024–25
