= Ervin Kurti =

Kosovar footballer

Personal information
- Date of birth: 29 March 1995 (age 31)
- Place of birth: Novi Pazar, FR Yugoslavia
- Height: 1.80 m (5 ft 11 in)
- Position: Forward

Team information
- Current team: Kosova München
- Number: 34

Youth career
- –2013: Bardhi

Senior career*
Years	Team	Apps	(Gls)
2013–2017	Trepça	4	(1)
2017–2019	Jošanica	10	(0)
2019	Sloga Sjenica		
2019–2020	Jošanica		
2020–2021	Novi Pazar	7	(1)
2020	→ Tutin (loan)		
2021–2022	Türksport Kempten	14	(13)
2022–2023	Cambodunum Kempten	21	(39)
2023–2024	Jošanica		
2024–2026	1906 Haidhausen	56	(45)
2026–	Kosova München	11	(6)
- * Club domestic league appearances and goals as of 27 September 2026

Ervin Kurti (Serbian Cyrillic: Ервин Курти; born 29 March 1995) is a Serbian footballer of Albanian origin who plays as a midfielder for German-based Albanian diaspora club Kosova München.

== Career ==
=== Early career ===
Kurti started playing football at Kosovan club Bardhi, one of the famous football schools in Mitrovica and was part of all team levels from youth to junior, he besides being was part of Bardhi, he was part even of Trepça (2013–2017), FK Jošanica (2017–2019; 2019–2020) and Sloga Sjenica (2019).

=== Novi Pazar ===
On 26 July 2020, Kurti joined Serbian SuperLiga side Novi Pazar, on a one-year contract and received squad number 8. Six days later, he made his debut in a 3–0 away defeat against Red Star Belgrade after coming on as a substitute at 64th minute in place of Mirza Delimeđac.

== Honours ==
Trepça

- Kosovo First League: 2015–16
