= Erlis Xhemajli =

Kosovo national football player

Personal information
- Date of birth: 10 July 2003 (age 23)
- Place of birth: Gjilan, Kosovo under UN administration
- Height: 1.86 m (6 ft 1 in)
- Position: Midfielder

Team information
- Current team: Ballkani
- Number: 16

Youth career
- –2022: Gjilani

Senior career*
Years	Team	Apps	(Gls)
2022-2023	Gjilani	12	(0)
2022	→ Kika (loan)		
2024–2026	Dukagjini	64	(1)
2026–	Ballkani	7	(0)

International career^{‡}
2021	Kosovo U19	2	(0)
- * Club domestic league appearances and goals as of 7 October 2026 ‡ National team caps and goals as of 23:40, 19 October 2025 (UTC)

Erlis Xhemajli (born 10 July 2003, Gjilan, Kosovo) is a Kosovo football player who plays as a midfielder for Ballkani.

== Career ==
Xhemajli, who started his career in SC Gjilani, one of the Kosovo Superliga teams, made his debut against FC Ballkani in the 27th week of the 2022-23 season.

Xhemajli joined the SC Gjilani team in the 2022–23 season. On 1 July 2022, he was loaned as a player in the first category of Kosovo football with the team KF Kika where he was part of the team for 6 months.

On 29 June 2024, he signed for Dukagjini. He was a regular starter in his first season with the club.

On 21 May 2026, he was sent-off in the 2025-26 Kosovar Cup final as his team Dukagjini won the title defeating FC Ferizaj 2-1.

On 5 July 2026, he was signed by Ballkani.

== International career ==
Xhemajli played 2 times in the U19 European Championship Qualifications.

== Honours ==
Dukagjini

- Kosovar Cup: 2026
