= Roberto Salinas Price =

Mexican author

Roberto Salinas Price (1938 in Mexico City - August 13, 2012 in Mexico City) was a Mexican author and amateur scholar of Homer.

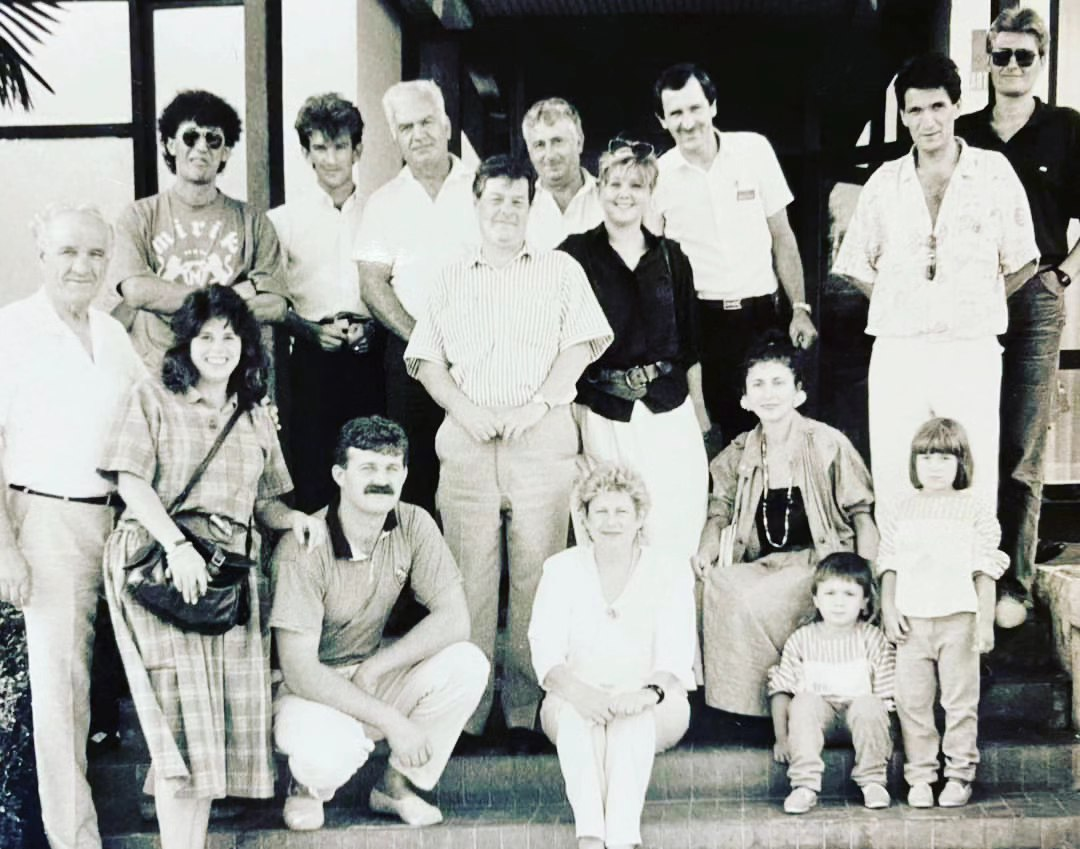
Roberto Salinas Price with collaborators in Čapljina, Bosnia & Herzegovina, SFR Yugoslavia 1985

== Biography ==
Salinas comes from an industrialist family, his father was co-founder of the furniture company Salinas y Rocha (today Grupo Salinas). Salinas was occupied with the Iliad and the Odyssey since his youth. He worked as a hotelier and restaurateur for 20 years before devoting himself entirely to his Homer studies. He was a member of the Mont Pelerin Society.

== Theory ==
Salinas advocates a theory that Troy was located on the border of southern Dalmatia coast and Herzegovina in village of Gabela (between towns of Čapljina and Metković). He justifies this with numerous references and inconsistencies in Homer's epics. In the specialist science this theory is not taken seriously.

== Selected bibliography ==
- Homer's blind audience: an essay on the Iliad's geographical prerequisites for the site of Ilios, Scylax Press, San Antonio 1985.
- Atlas of Homeric geography, Scylax Press, San Antonio 1992.
- with Carlos A. Ball: La satanización de serbios: opiniones diversas sobre la campaña malévola de Bill Clinton y la propaganda de desinformación, Ediciones Huicalco, 2000.
- Homeric Whispers. Intimations of Orthodoxy in the Iliad and Odyssey, Scylax Press, San Antonio 2006. ISBN 978-0-910865-11-1
