= Dion Gallapeni =

Kosovan footballer

Personal information
- Date of birth: 22 December 2004 (age 21)
- Place of birth: Suharekë, Kosovo
- Height: 1.82 m (6 ft 0 in)
- Position: Left-back

Team information
- Current team: Wisła Płock
- Number: 19

Youth career
- Winner Prizren
- –2023: Prishtina

Senior career*
Years	Team	Apps	(Gls)
2023–2025	Prishtina	49	(2)
2025–2026	Widzew Łódź	10	(1)
2026	→ Wisła Płock (loan)	10	(0)
2026–	Wisła Płock	12	(0)

International career^{‡}
2024	Kosovo U21	3	(0)
2025–	Kosovo	19	(0)
- * Club domestic league appearances and goals as of 15:06, 9 November 2026 (UTC) ‡ National team caps and goals as of 23:41, 17 November 2026 (UTC)

Dion Gallapeni (born 22 December 2004) is a Kosovan professional footballer who plays as a left-back for Ekstraklasa club Wisła Płock and the Kosovo national team.

== Club career ==
Gallapeni began his career at Winner Prizren and then transferred to Prishtina. On 4 January 2023, he signed his first professional contract with the first team competing in the Kosovo Superleague. On 12 February, he was named as a Prishtina substitute for the first time in a league match against Dukagjini. His debut with Prishtina came on 19 April in the 2022–23 Kosovar Cup semi-finals against Vushtrria after coming on as a substitute at 46th minute in place of Gledi Mici.

On 30 June 2025, Gallapeni joined Polish Ekstraklasa club Widzew Łódź on a four-year contract, after Widzew activated his €300,000 release clause. On 16 February 2026, he joined fellow Ekstraklasa side Wisła Płock on loan for the remainder of the season, with an option to buy. On 31 May 2026, Wisła triggered the buy option in Gallapeni's loan deal; he joined the club permanently on a four-year deal, for a fee reported to be between €700,000 and €800,000.

== International career ==
In May 2024, Gallapeni received a call-up from Kosovo U20 for a three-day training camp in Hajvalia. On 2 September 2024, he received a urgent call-up from Kosovo U21 for the UEFA Euro 2025 qualification match against Israel. On 9 January 2025, Gallapeni received a call-up from Kosovo national senior team for a three-day training camp in Pristina.

After his call-up from Kosovo, there were reports that he would switch his allegiance to Albania. After this on 14 March 2025, Gallapeni received again a call-up from Kosovo for the 2024–25 UEFA Nations League play-offs against Iceland. His debut with Kosovo came seven days later in the 2024–25 UEFA Nations League play-offs against Iceland after coming on as a substitute at 87th minute in place of Florent Muslija.

== Career statistics ==
=== International ===
As of match played 17 November 2026

Appearances and goals by national team and year
National team	Year	Apps	Goals
Kosovo	2025	9	0
Kosovo	2026	10	0
Total		19	0

== Honours ==
Prishtina

- Kosovar Cup: 2022–23, 2024–25
- Kosovar Supercup: 2023
