= Liridon Balaj =

Kosovan footballer (born 1999)

Personal information
- Date of birth: 15 August 1999 (age 27)
- Place of birth: La Chaux-de-Fonds, Switzerland
- Height: 1.74 m (5 ft 9 in)
- Position: Midfielder

Team information
- Current team: Drita
- Number: 10

Youth career
- –2014: Rinia Isniq
- 2014–2018: Besa Pejë

Senior career*
Years	Team	Apps	(Gls)
2016–2019	Besa Pejë	46	(27)
2019–2022	Aarau	86	(17)
2022–2024	Deinze	19	(0)
2023–2024	→ Schaffhausen (loan)	21	(1)
2024–2025	Skënderbeu	18	(1)
2025–	Drita	36	(6)

International career^{‡}
2017–2018	Kosovo U19	5	(0)
2021–	Kosovo	2	(0)
- * Club domestic league appearances and goals as of 26 October 2026 ‡ National team caps and goals as of 26 July 2025

Liridon Balaj (born 15 August 1999) is a Kosovan footballer who plays as a midfielder for Drita of the Kosovo Superleague and the Kosovo national team.

== Club career ==
=== Besa Pejë ===
He started his professional career with Besa Pejë in 2016.

=== Aarau ===
On 7 August 2019, Balaj signed a two-year contract with Swiss Challenge League club Aarau and received squad number 9. One day later, he made his debut in a 4–2 away defeat against Chiasso after coming on as a substitute in the 74th minute in place of Petar Mišić.

=== Deinze ===
On 2 September 2022, Balaj joined Deinze in Belgium on a two-year contract.

=== Schaffhausen ===
On 8 September 2023, Balaj moved on loan to Schaffhausen back in Switzerland.

=== Skënderbeu ===
On 18 September 2024, Balaj signed a three-year contract with KF Skënderbeu in the Albanian Kategoria Superiore.

=== Drita ===
After Skënderbeu were relegated, Balaj signed a two-year contract with FC Drita in the Football Superleague of Kosovo on 26 May 2025. He was part of the team that reached the 2025-26 UEFA Conference League knockout phase play-offs and scored one goal and gave two assists in that round against NK Celje.

== International career ==
On 31 May 2021, Balaj received a call-up from Kosovo for the friendly matches against Guinea and Gambia. Eight days later, he made his debut with Kosovo in a friendly match against Guinea after coming on as a substitute at 46th minute in place of Arbër Hoxha.

== Honours ==
Drita

- Kosovar Supercup: 2025
