= Blažo Rajović =

Montenegrin footballer

Personal information
- Date of birth: 26 March 1986 (age 40)
- Place of birth: Titograd, SFR Yugoslavia
- Height: 1.92 m (6 ft 4 in)
- Position: Centre back

Team information
- Current team: Grbalj

Senior career*
Years	Team	Apps	(Gls)
2003–2004	Mladost Podgorica	13	(1)
2004–2005	Dečić	13	(2)
2004–2005	Kom	10	(4)
2005–2006	Budućnost Podgorica	67	(0)
2009–2011	Vllaznia	50	(5)
2011–2013	Flamurtari	42	(1)
2013–2014	Vllaznia Shkodër	6	(0)
2014–2015	Zeta	5	(1)
2015	Dečić		
2015–2016	Naxxar Lions	13	(1)
2016	Mornar	9	(0)
2016	Petrovac	16	(0)
2017	Laçi	1	(0)
2018–2019	Besa Pejë		
2019	Lovćen	15	(0)
2019–2020	Petrovac	13	(0)
2020–2021	Besa Pejë	0	(0)
2021–	Grbalj	0	(0)

International career^{‡}
2006–2008	Montenegro U21	5	(1)
- * Club domestic league appearances and goals ‡ National team caps and goals as of 27 May 2019

Blažo Rajović (Serbian Cyrillic: Блажо Рајовић; born 26 March 1986) is a Montenegrin professional footballer who plays as a defender for Grbalj.

== Honours ==
- Montenegrin First League: 2007–08
