= Hin recombinase =

DNA-invertase hin

Identifiers
- Organism: Salmonella enterica subsp. enterica serovar Typhimurium str. LT2
- Symbol: hin
- Orthologs: OMA: entry
- UniProt: P03013
Search for
- Structures: Swiss-model
- Domains: InterPro

Hin recombinase is a 21kD protein composed of 198 amino acids that is found in the bacteria Salmonella. Hin belongs to the serine recombinase family (B2) of DNA invertases in which it relies on the active site serine to initiate DNA cleavage and recombination. The related protein, gamma-delta resolvase shares high similarity to Hin, of which much structural work has been done, including structures bound to DNA and reaction intermediates. Hin functions to invert a 900 base pair (bp) DNA segment within the salmonella genome that contains a promoter for downstream flagellar genes, fljA and fljB. Inversion of the intervening DNA alternates the direction of the promoter and thereby alternates expression of the flagellar genes. This is advantageous to the bacterium as a means of escape from the host immune response.

Hin functions by binding to two 26bp imperfect inverted repeat sequences as a homodimer. These hin binding sites flank the invertible segment which not only encodes the Hin gene itself, but also contains an enhancer element to which the bacterial Fis proteins binds with nanomolar affinity. Four molecules of Fis bind to this site as a homodimers and are required for the recombination reaction to proceed.

The initial reaction requires binding of Hin and Fis to their respective DNA sequences and assemble into a higher-order nucleoprotein complex with branched plectonemic supercoils with the aid of the DNA bending protein HU. At this point, it is believed that the Fis protein modulates subtle contacts to activate the reaction, possibly through direct interactions with the Hin protein. Activation of the 4 catalytic serine residues within the Hin tetramer make a 2-bp double stranded DNA break and forms a covalent reaction intermediate. The DNA cleavage event also requires the divalent metal cation magnesium. A large conformational change reveals a large hydrophobic interface that allows for subunit rotation which may be driven by superhelical torsion within the protein-DNA complex. After this 180° rotation, Hin returns to its native conformation and re-ligates the cleaved DNA, without the aid of high energy cofactors and without the loss of any DNA.
