= Ardian Muja =

Kosovan footballer

Personal information
- Date of birth: 9 December 1997 (age 28)
- Place of birth: Mitrovica, FR Yugoslavia
- Height: 1.79 m (5 ft 10 in)

Team information
- Current team: Prishtina
- Number: 11

Youth career
- –2014: Bardhi
- 2014–2016: Trepça

Senior career*
Years	Team	Apps	(Gls)
2016–2017	Trepça		
2017–2023	Trepça '89	92	(11)
2023–	Prishtina	98	(7)
- * Club domestic league appearances and goals as of 22 June 2026

Ardian Muja (born 9 December 1997) is a Kosovar professional footballer who plays as a Left Back for Prishtina.

== Personal life ==
Muja was born in Mitrovica, FR Yugoslavia and is the elder brother of Arbnor Muja who is also a footballer who plays as a right winger for the Turkish club Samsunspor, and have been teammates in the Kosovan clubs Trepça (before 2017) and Trepça '89 (2017–2018, 2021–2022).

== Honours ==
Trepça

- Kosovo First League: 2015–16

Trepça '89

- Kosovar Supercup: 2017

Prishtina

- Kosovar Cup: 2024–25
- Kosovar Supercup: 2024–25

Individual

- Kosovar Cup top scorer: 2024–25
