= Gani Sejdiu =

Kosovan coach and former footballer

Personal information
- Date of birth: 21 August 1961 (age 65)
- Place of birth: Kosovska Mitrovica, FPR Yugoslavia

Senior career*
Years	Team	Apps	(Gls)
- Trepça

Managerial career
- 2005: Renova
- 2009–2011: Trepça
- 2012–2013: Trepça '89
- 2014–2015: Feronikeli
- 2016: Trepça '89
- 2016–2017: Besa Pejë
- 2017: Feronikeli
- 2017: Trepça '89
- 2018: Vëllaznimi
- 2019–2020: Ballkani
- 2020: Drenica
- 2020–2021: Vushtrria
- 2022: Vëllaznimi
- 2022–2023: Phoenix Banjë
- 2024–2025: Drenica
- 2025–: Trepça '89
- * Club domestic league appearances and goals

Gani Sejdiu (born 21 August 1961) is a Kosovan coach and former footballer.

== Honours ==
=== Player ===
Trepça

- Kosovo Superleague: 1992–93

=== Manager ===
Trepça

- Kosovo Superleague: 2009–10
- Kosovar Supercup: 2009–10

Feronikeli

- Kosovo Superleague: 2014–15
- Kosovar Cup: 2014–15

Besa Pejë

- Kosovar Cup: 2015–16

== Personal life ==
His nephew, Arlind Sejdiu, is a professional football player.
