= Armend Halili =

Kosovan footballer (born 1997)

Personal information
- Date of birth: 22 June 1997 (age 29)
- Place of birth: Pristina, FR Yugoslavia
- Height: 1.83 m (6 ft 0 in)
- Position: Left-back

Team information
- Current team: Feronikeli 74
- Number: 3

Youth career
- 2010–2015: Ramiz Sadiku

Senior career*
Years	Team	Apps	(Gls)
2015–2016	Kukësi		
2016–2017	Hajvalia		
2017–2018	KEK		
2018–2023	Gjilani	110	(2)
2023–	Feronikeli 74	44	(0)
- * Club domestic league appearances and goals as of 26 June 2025

Armend Halili (born 22 June 1997) is a Kosovan professional footballer who plays as a left-back for Feronikeli 74.

== Club career ==
Halili signed a contract with the football club Gjilani on 6 July 2018.

Halili was selected in the formation of the 2021–22 autumn season in the position of centre-back in the Football Superleague of Kosovo.
