= Tahir Batatina =

Kosovan football manager (born 1977)

Personal details
- Born: 12 July 1977 (age 49) Podujevë, SFR Yugoslavia (modern Kosovo)
- Occupation: Football manager Military officer

Military service
- Allegiance: (Republic of Kosova) Kosovo
- Branch/service: Kosovo Liberation Army; Kosovo Protection Corps; Kosovo Security Force
Association football career
Managerial career
- Years: Team
- 2013–2018: Llapi
- 2018–2019: Llapi (sporting director)
- 2019–: Llapi

Tahir Batatina (born 12 July 1977) is a Kosovan football manager and former military officer who manages Llapi.

== Life and career ==
Batatina was born on 12 July 1977 in Podujevë, at the time part of Yugoslavia. He started aspiring to become a football manager at the age of seven. He played football. He obtained a master's degree in sports science. He has served in the Kosovo Liberation Army and the Kosovo Security Force. He has worked in the construction industry. He obtained a UEFA A License. He has been regarded to prefer the 4-2-3-1 formation.

He has been described as "one of the most successful coaches in Kosovo, while he has graced football with his bombastic statements to the media". In 2013, he was appointed manager of Llapi. He has also financially contributed to the club. He helped them achieve third place in the league. In 2018, he was appointed sporting director of Llapi. In 2019, he returned as manager of Llapi. He helped them win the 2020–21 Kosovar Cup, 2021–22 Kosovar Cup, and 2021 Kosovar Supercup.

== Honours ==
Llapi

- Kosovar Cup: 2020–21, 2021–22
