= Brštanik =

- Village
- Location within Bosnia and Herzegovina
- Coordinates: 43.1735071°N 17.9285716°E
- Country: Bosnia and Herzegovina
- Entity: Republika Srpska; Federation of Bosnia and Herzegovina
- Canton: Herzegovina-Neretva
- Municipality: Berkovići; Stolac

Area
  - Total: 3.66 sq mi (9.47 km^{2})

Population (2013)
  - Total: 1
  - Density: 0.27/sq mi (0.11/km^{2})
- Time zone: UTC+1 (CET)
  - Summer (DST): UTC+2 (CEST)

Brštanik is a village in the municipalities of Berkovići, Republika Srpska, and Stolac, the Herzegovina-Neretva Canton, the Federation of Bosnia and Herzegovina, Bosnia and Herzegovina.

== Demographics ==
According to the 2013 census, only one Croat was living in the Berkovići part with no one living in the Stolac part.
