= Vokli Laroshi =

Albanian footballer

Personal information
- Date of birth: 6 August 2001 (age 25)
- Place of birth: Elbasan, Albania
- Height: 1.89 m (6 ft 2 in)
- Position: Goalkeeper

Team information
- Current team: Gjilani
- Number: 1

Youth career
- 2012–2013: Gostima
- 2013–2016: Turbina
- 2016–2019: Shkëndija Durrës

Senior career*
Years	Team	Apps	(Gls)
2019–2021	Turbina	36	(0)
2021–2022	Partizani	0	(0)
2022–2023	Turbina	11	(2)
2023–2025	Llapi	18	(0)
2025–	Gjilani	22	(0)

International career
2021	Albania U21	1	(0)
- * Club domestic league appearances and goals as of 22 June 2026

Vokli Laroshi (born 6 August 2001) is an Albanian professional footballer who plays as a goalkeeper for the Kosovan club Gjilani.
