= Zhabar i Epërm =

- Village
- Location in Kosovo
- Coordinates: 42°51′50″N 20°49′55″E
- Location: Kosovo
- District: Mitrovicë
- Municipality: Mitrovicë
- Elevation: 579 m (1,900 ft)

Population (2024)
  - Total: 936
- Time zone: UTC+1 (CET)
  - Summer (DST): UTC+2 (CEST)

Zhabar i Epërm (in Albanian) is a village in the municipality of Mitrovica in the District of Mitrovica, Kosovo. According to the 2024 census, it has 936 inhabitants.

== Demography ==
In 2024 census, the village had in total 936 inhabitants, all of them Albanians.
