= KF Tefik Çanga =

Football club in Kosovo

- Full name: Klub Futbollistik Tefik Çanga
- Founded: 1978; 48 years ago
- Ground: Tërn Sports Field
- Capacity: 500
- League: Kosovo First League
- 2025–26: Kosovo First League, 9th of 18

KF Tefik Çanga (Albanian: Klubi Futbollistik Tefik Çanga) is a professional football club from Kosovo which competes in the second tier (liga e par) . The club is based in Tërn, Ferizaj. Their home ground is the Tërn Sports Field which has a viewing capacity of 500.

== See also ==
- List of football clubs in Kosovo
