= KF Dardania =

Football club in Kosovo

- Full name: Klub Futbollistik Dardania
- Founded: 1992; 33 years ago
- Ground: Dardania Stadium
- Capacity: 1,000
- Manager: Fisnik Papuçi
- League: Kosovo Second League
- 2022–23: Kosovo Second League, 13th of 16

KF Dardania (Albanian: Klubi Futbollistik Dardania) is a professional football club from Kosovo which competes in the Second League. The club is based in Qyshk. Their home ground is the Dardania Stadium which has a seating capacity of 1,000.
