= FC Besa Peja =

Football club in Kosovo

Besa Peja
- Full name: Football Club Besa Peja (Klubi Futbollistik Besa Peja)
- Nickname: Besa Boys (Djemtë e Besës)
- Founded: 1923; 103 years ago as Behari i Ri; 4 December 2023; 2 years ago (current form)
- Ground: Shahin Haxhiislami Stadium
- Capacity: 8,500
- President: vacant
- Manager: vacant
- League: Kosovo First League
- 2025–26: Kosovo First League, 11th of 18
Home colours	Away colours

Football Club Besa Peja (Albanian: Klubi Futbollistik Besa Peja) is a football club based in Peja, Kosovo. Their home ground is Shahin Haxhiislami and they compete in the Second Football League of Kosovo. The club went defunct after having lots of financial problems and not being able to climb up the Kosovo football league system, but were refounded the following year after a merger with another club, thus adopting a new name, new colors for the club and a new crest.

== History ==
=== Early history (1923–1945) ===
The current club is considered to be the successor of a number of different football and sports clubs that had been active in the city of Peja since 1923, with the first being Behari i Ri who were the original club that today's FC Besa Peja is based on. In 1924, another club named Gajret Pejë was formed, but ended disbanded soon after. Other clubs that were also formed in Peja at the time were Zeleni Venac in 1925, Tarabosh in 1927, Dukagjini Pejë in 1928, Radnički Peć in 1930, Budućnost Peć in 1935, and Ardhmëria Pejë who were active between 1941 and 1945.

Between 1923 and World War II, the different clubs representing the city of Peja competed only in friendly tournaments as none of the clubs were members of the Belgrade Football Subassociation. A club representing the city competed in the 1942 Albanian Superliga, but the war period championships that were held in Albania are not recognised by the Albanian Football Association.

=== Development of football (1945–1991) ===
Following the end of World War II, football in Peja and the rest of the Kosovo region became more prominent and this was in no part due to the rise in tournaments and championships that were held regularly. The most dominant club of the post war era was Yugoslav backed FK Budućnost Peć, which won the Kosovo Province League three times, in the 61/62, 65/66 and 77/78 seasons. Other clubs were also active including Përparimi Pejë, who only functioned between 1949 and 1951. Other clubs active after World War II included Kombinati i Drurit, Klubi Kristal, who were active between 1973 and 1990. Another club that was formed in the 1970s was Klubi Kombinatit Bujqësor Industrial, a club heavily involved in the agricultural business at the time. In 1974, the first club to be called Besa was formed, which is where the current name of the club comes from, which is an Albanian cultural precept meaning "faith" and "to keep a promise". Other clubs were formed to represent the different professions in the city at the time, including Klubi Fabrikës së Autopjesëve of the automobile parts factory, Klubi Kombinatit të Lëkur-Këpucëve of the leather and footwear factory and Kosovatransi Klubi Ndërrmarjes Transportuese Të Udhëtarëve of the shipyard passenger transport profession.

=== End of Yugoslavia (1991–1998) ===
There was widespread ethnic tension in Yugoslavia in the 1990s. The three main clubs that were left in Peja at the time, Besa, Budućnost and Kristal, held a joint assembly early in 1991 and decided to merge the clubs in order to create what is now known as FC Besa Peja that was to compete in the independent League of Kosovo that was organised by the Football Federation of Kosovo, which was out of the Yugoslav football league system. This parallel competitions were of poor standard and were limited to matches played in remote villages on fields rather since the stadiums were still property of the clubs which were competing in the Yugoslav leagues. Until 1996 the Kosovo Superleague was held in four different groups, whose winners would then face each other in a playoff to determine the champions, but in 1996, the original league format was restored. The 1997–98 Kosovo Superleague was interrupted due to the start of the Kosovo War while KF Besa was top of the league.

=== Post war rebuilding (1999–2003) ===
The Kosovo War devastated the country, including Peja, and sports activities were put on hold in 1999. Football, much like most things in Kosovo, had to restart once again and the development of FC Besa Peja was slow as the club began to rebuild from 1999. The club relied on donors from the city, and the main donor of the post war period was Birra Peja and the brewery, who became the club's main financier in July 2003.

== Honours ==
Kosovo Superleague

- Winners (3): 2004–05, 2005–06, 2006–07

Kosovar Province League (as FK Budućnost Peć)

- Winners (3): 1961–62, 1965–66, 1977–78

Kosovar Cup

- Winners (3): 2004–05, 2010–11, 2016–17

Kosovar Supercup

- Winners (1): 2004–05

== Players ==
=== Current squad ===
As of 6 February 2021

Note: Flags indicate national team as defined under FIFA eligibility rules; some limited exceptions apply. Players may hold more than one non-FIFA nationality.

No.	Pos.	Nation	Player
1	GK	KOS	Agron Kolaj
2	DF	ENG	Guri Hana
3	DF	KOS	Valton Ibrahimi
5	DF	KOS	Ardi Ajdini
6	FW	KOS	Gentrit Salihu
7	MF	KOS	Erjon Morina
8	MF	ALB	Diellor Beseni
9	FW	KOS	Ardit Tahiri
10	MF	KOS	Donart Sheqerolli (captain)
11	FW	KOS	Bekim Maliqi
13	MF	MTN	Ethmane M'Heimar
15	MF	KOS	Diar Halili
16	GK	KOS	Kreshnik Nreca

No.	Pos.	Nation	Player
17	MF	KOS	Festim Haxhiu
18	DF	MNE	Blažo Rajović
19	MF	KOS	Ardi Qorri (on loan from Feronikeli)
21	MF	KOS	Ron Raçi
22	FW	KOS	Dren Idrizi
27	DF	MTN	Bilal Taghiyoullah
26	FW	KOS	Redon Syla
30	MF	KOS	Etnik Brruti
33	FW	KOS	Dhurim Zhuri (on loan from Prishtina)
34	DF	ALB	Agon Xhaka (on loan from Prishtina)
36	FW	MTN	Ahmed Salem M'bareck
37	MF	KOS	Boiken Shala
40	GK	KOS	Visar Haxhijaj

=== Out on loan ===
Note: Flags indicate national team as defined under FIFA eligibility rules; some limited exceptions apply. Players may hold more than one non-FIFA nationality.

No.	Pos.	Nation	Player
4	DF	KOS	Andi Alshiqi (at Ramiz Sadiku until 30 June 2021)
—	MF	KOS	Arbër Maznikolli (at Onix Banjë until 30 June 2021)

=== Notable former players ===
This is a list of Besa Peja players with senior national team appearances:

Albania and Kosovo

- Youth
1. (Albania) Bekim Kastrati
- Senior
1. (Albania) (Kosovo) Arbër Hoxha
2. (Kosovo) Liridon Balaj
3. (Kosovo) Bernard Berisha
4. (Kosovo) Leotrim Bekteshi
5. (Kosovo) Ilir Nallbani
6. (Kosovo) Fisnik Papuçi
7. (Kosovo) Ron Raçi
8. (Kosovo) Kastriot Rexha

Other countries

1. (Mauritania) Abdoul Ba
2. (Montenegro) Fatos Beqiraj

== Personnel ==
Current technical staff
Position	Name
Head coach	(Kosovo) Leotrim Krasniqi
Assistant coach(es)	(Kosovo) Fisnik Papuçi
Conditioning coach	(France) Tahar Ben-Romdhane
Goalkeeping coach	(Kosovo) Valmir Bytyqi
Scout	(Kosovo) Fetim Kasapi
Physiotherapist	(Kosovo) Fatlind Maraj
Board members
Office	Name
President	(Kosovo) Ylli Kullashi
Advisor	(Kosovo) Dritëro Daci

== List of managers ==
- (Kosovo) Valdet Shoshi (2004–2005)
- (Kosovo) Genc Hoxha (2005–2007)
- (Kosovo) Miftar Rama (2013)
- (Kosovo) Arbnor Morina (27 Aug 2014–7 Apr 2016)
- (Kosovo) Ilir Nallbani (Apr 2016–May 2016) (caretaker)
- (Kosovo) Gani Sejdiu (23 May 2016–Mar 2017)
- (Kosovo) Astrit Imami (13 Mar 2017–Jul 2017)
- (Kosovo) Valdet Shoshi (27 Jul 2017–May 2018)
- (Kosovo) Ismet Munishi (25 May 2018–14 Sep 2018)
- (Kosovo) Miftar Rama (2019–)
