= Nemanja =

Stefan Nemanja
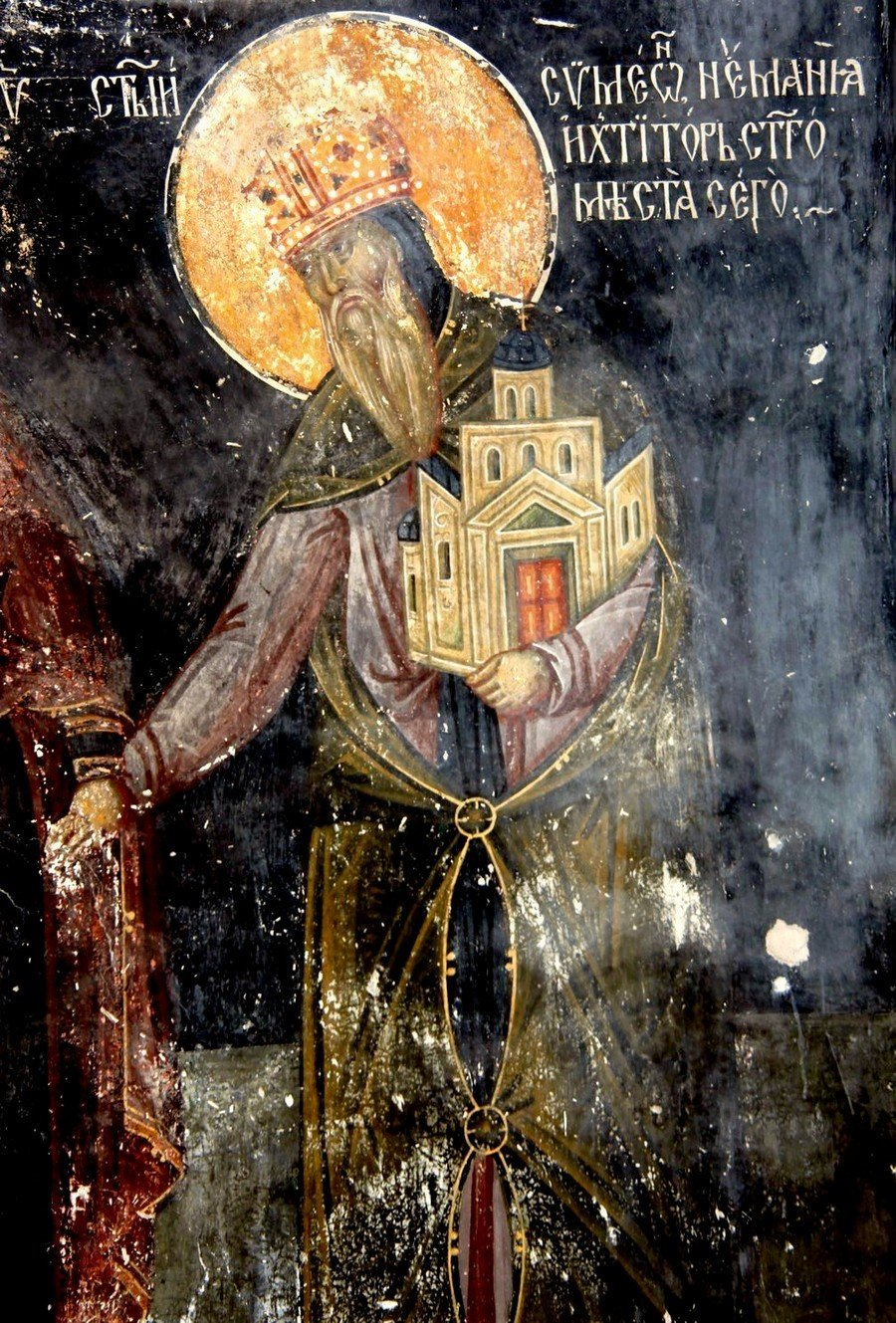
- Pronunciation: [němaɲa]
- Gender: masculine
- Language: Serbian

Origin
- Meaning: That he has no flaw
- Region of origin: Serbia

Other names
- Alternative spelling: Nemanya; Немања

Nemanja (Serbian Cyrillic: Немања) is a masculine Serbian given name. It is derived from the by-name borne by the founder of the Nemanjić dynasty, Stefan Nemanja (1114–1199), a Serbian grand prince who was venerated as a saint after his death.

Etymologically, many think the name most likely derives from a meaning "No Flaw", from Serbian Ne manjka – Nemanja " (basically means that he has no flaw)"

== Modern given name ==
In Serbia, the name rose to popularity in the 1980s. Between 2003 and 2005, the name was 9th most popular name given to newly-born boys.

- Nemanja Aleksandrov (born 1987), Serbian basketball player
- Nemanja Bezbradica (born 1993), Serbian basketball player
- Nemanja Bilbija (born 1990), Bosnian footballer
- Nemanja Bjelica (born 1988), Serbian basketball player
- Nemanja Čorović (born 1975), Serbian footballer
- Nemanja Dangubić (born 1993), Serbian basketball player
- Nemanja Dimitrijević (born 1992), Serbian paralympian athlete
- Nemanja Glavčić (born 1997), Serbian footballer
- Nemanja Gordić (born 1988), Bosnian basketball player
- Nemanja Gudelj (born 1991), Serbian footballer
- Nemanja Ilić (born 1990), Serbian handball player
- Nemanja Jovanović (born 1984), Serbian footballer
- Nemanja Kojić (footballer) (born 1990), Serbian footballer
- Nemanja Krstić (born 1993), Serbian basketball player
- Emir Nemanja Kusturica (born 1954), Serbian film director, screenwriter, actor, film producer and musician
- Nemanja Kuzmanović (born 1989), Serbian footballer
- Nemanja Majdov (born 1996), Serbian judoka
- Nemanja Maksimović (born 1995), Serbian footballer
- Nemanja Matić (born 1988), Serbian footballer
- Nemanja Mijušković (born 1992), Montenegrin footballer
- Nemanja Miljković (1990–2020), Serbian basketball player
- Nemanja Milisavljević (born 1984), Serbian footballer
- Nemanja Mirosavljev (born 1970), Serbian shooter
- Nemanja Mladenović (born 1994), Serbian handball player
- Nemanja Nedović (born 1991), Serbian basketball player
- Nemanja Nikolić (footballer born 1987), Serbian-Hungarian footballer
- Nemanja Nikolić (footballer born 1988), Montenegrin footballer
- Nemanja Obradović (born 1991), Serbian handball player
- Nemanja Obrić (born 1984), Serbian footballer
- Nemanja Pavlović (born 1977), Serbian footballer
- Nemanja Pejčinović (born 1987), Serbian footballer
- Nemanja Petrić (born 1987), Serbian volleyball player
- Nemanja Pribak (born 1984), Serbian-Macedonian handball player
- Nemanja Radoja (born 1993), Serbian footballer
- Nemanja Radonjić (born 1996), Serbian footballer
- Nemanja Radulović (born 1985), Serbian violinist
- Nemanja Rnić (born 1984), Serbian footballer
- Nemanja Stevanović (born 1992), Serbian footballer
- Nemanja Tomić (born 1988), Serbian footballer
- Nemanja Vidić (born 1981), Serbian footballer
- Nemanja Vuković (born 1984), Montenegrin footballer
- Nemanja Zelenović (born 1990), Serbian handball player

== See also ==
- Slavic names
