= KF Rilindja 1974 =

Football club in Kosovo

- Full name: Klub Futbollistik Rilindja 1974
- Founded: 1974; 52 years ago
- Ground: Baran Sports Field
- Capacity: 500
- Manager: Behar Maliqi

KF Rilindja 1974 (Albanian: Klubi Futbollistik Rilindja 1974; previously known as KF Lugu i Baranit) is a professional football club from Kosovo which competes in the First League (Group A). The club is based in Baran, Pejë, in the Baran Valley region. Their home ground is the Baran Sports Field which has a viewing capacity of 500. In the 2021/2022 Second League, Rilindja was the second place after KF Vjosa and promoted to the First League.

== List of managers ==
- (Kosovo) Behar Maliqi (12 August 2026 – )

== See also ==
- List of football clubs in Kosovo
