= FC Feronikeli 74 =

Association football club in Kosovo

Feronikeli 74
- Full name: Football Club Feronikeli 74
- Nickname: Tigrat e Zi (The Black Tigers)
- Founded: 8 April 1974; 52 years ago as Nikeli, later as Feronikeli; 20 August 2022; 4 years ago as Feronikeli 74
- Ground: Rexhep Rexhepi Stadium
- Capacity: 6,000
- President: Alban Veseli
- Manager: Elon Berisha
- League: Kosovo Superleague
- 2025–26: Kosovo First League, 2nd of 18 (promoted)
- Website: feronikelifc.com
Home colours	Away colours

FC Feronikeli 74 (Albanian: Klubi Futbollistik Feronikeli 74), commonly referred to as Feronikeli 74 and also known as Feronikeli is a professional football club based in Drenas, Kosovo. The club has played in the Kosovo First League, which is the second tier of football in the country.

== History ==
In 1974, the club was founded as Nikeli. During the spring and summer of 1974, an intense activity took place in all aspects for the formation of the football club, its registration and inclusion in the Inter-Municipal Football League level, namely, at the District League of Pristina. At the top of this activity was the physical education teacher, Hashim Mala.

On 8 April 1974, the Founding Assembly of the Football Club was held in the Glogovac Municipal Assembly Hall. In this assembly was founded the club, which was named Nikeli with headquarters in Glogovac. Then, the headship of the club was elected, the 11-member presidency with Tahir Ajazi as president, vice-president Murtes Zogu, secretary Jusuf Dobra, treasurer Habib Kukiqi and board members were Fetah Elshani, Ismail Bajraktari, Mehdi Bardhi, Nazif Sejda, Rade Jevremović, Remzi Heta and Sylejman Kastrati. This assembly elected Mehdi Bardhi as technical director, while coach was Hashim Mala.

The club has historically closely been associated with NewCo Feronikeli, the nearby ore mining and metallurgical complex, ever since the plant was built in 1984. In the 2014–15 season, they were crowned champions for the first time in the club's history. They won the 2018–19 championship as well, qualifying for the UEFA Champions League preliminary rounds for the first time in their history.

== Stadium ==
The club has played its home games at the Rexhep Rexhepi Stadium (Albanian: Stadiumi Rexhep Rexhepi) is a multi-purpose stadium in Glogovac, Kosovo. The stadium has a capacity of 6,000 people all seater and is named after the club's former player and captain Rexhep Rexhepi, who fought for the Kosovo Liberation Army and was killed on 12 February 1999 by Serb forces during KLA insurgency right before the start of the Kosovo War.

== Supporters ==
Tigrat e Zi
- Founded: 2014; 12 years ago
- Type: Supporters' group
- Location: Drenas, Kosovo
- Arena: Rexhep Rexhepi Stadium
- Stand: West

Tigrat e Zi are the clubs' supporters. The supporters stand in the West part of the stadium. They named themselves after the special operations forces ‘Tigrat e Zi’ of the 111th brigade ‘Adem Jashari’ of the Kosovo Liberation Army as that’s where they were active during the Kosovo War.

== Honours ==
FC Feronikeli honours
Type	Competition	Titles	Seasons/Years
Domestic	Kosovo Superleague	3	2014–15, 2015–16, 2018–19
Domestic	Kosovar Cup	3	2013–14, 2014–15, 2018–19
Domestic	Kosovar Supercup	2	2015, 2019
International	Albania Independence Cup	1	2014

== Players ==
=== Current squad ===
As of 1 September 2026

Note: Flags indicate national team as defined under FIFA eligibility rules; some limited exceptions apply. Players may hold more than one non-FIFA nationality.

No.	Pos.	Nation	Player
2	DF	KOS	Granit Musa (3rd captain)
3	DF	KOS	Armend Halili (captain)
4	DF	KOS	Fatmir Rexhaj (4th captain)
5	DF	KOS	Astrit Thaqi
7	FW	KOS	Albin Prapashtica
8	MF	KOS	Herolind Shala (vice-captain)
9	FW	KOS	Shpresim Zogu
10	MF	KOS	Ibrahim Cërvadiku
11	FW	GHA	Daniel Tette
12	GK	UKR	Artem Odyntsov
13	DF	ALB	Indrit Prodani
14	MF	KOS	Adonis Qorri
18	DF	KOS	Bejtë Rexhepi
19	FW	CRO	Ivan Delić

No.	Pos.	Nation	Player
20	MF	KOS	Butrint Ademi
23	FW	BIH	Andrija Drljo
24	DF	KOS	Avni Selmani
25	DF	KOS	Kamer Rudari
26	MF	KOS	Gjelbrim Taipi
30	MF	KOS	Endrit Baholli
34	MF	CRO	Krešimir Luetić
44	DF	CPV	Jorginho Soares
45	FW	ENG	Udoyen Akpan
50	GK	KOS	Agron Kolaj
58	GK	KOS	Dokleat Kastrati
77	FW	KOS	Lorik Dobratiqi
78	FW	KOS	Ylber Murturi
88	MF	KOS	Arlind Shabani

=== Other players under contract ===
Note: Flags indicate national team as defined under FIFA eligibility rules; some limited exceptions apply. Players may hold more than one non-FIFA nationality.

No.	Pos.	Nation	Player
—	DF	GHA	Noah Yannick
—	MF	GHA	Franklin Kamleu

=== Out on loan ===
Note: Flags indicate national team as defined under FIFA eligibility rules; some limited exceptions apply. Players may hold more than one non-FIFA nationality.

No.	Pos.	Nation	Player
—	FW	KOS	Enes Hajrullahu (at Tefik Çanga until 30 June 2027)

== Personnel ==
Current technical staff
Position	Name
Head coach	(Kosovo) Elon Berisha
Assistant coach(es)	(Kosovo) Faruk Elshani
Team Manager	(Kosovo) Argjend Bardhi
Goalkeeping coach	(Kosovo) Avni Hasani
Physiotherapist	(Kosovo) Besim Bytyqi
Physiotherapist	(Kosovo) Arton Lestrani
Physiotherapist	(Kosovo) Kushtrim Ajazi
Board members
Office	Name
President	(Kosovo) Alban Veseli
Vice-president	(Kosovo) Ramadan Krasniqi
General director	(Kosovo) Artan Berisha
Secretary	(Kosovo) Isak Ismajli
Board members
Board members	(Kosovo) Shpend Bogiqi
Board members	(Kosovo) Leutrim Krasniqi
Board members	(Kosovo) Brahim Qorri
Board members	(Kosovo) Faruk Elshani
Board members	(Kosovo) Haxhi Lladrovci
Information and media officer	(Kosovo) Valdrin Krasniqi
Photographer	(Kosovo) Lindrit Sinani

== List of managers ==
No.	Name	From	To	Ref
1.	(Kosovo) Ramiz Krasniqi	2010	2011	—N/a
2.	(Kosovo) Musa Selimi	2011	2012	
3.	(Kosovo) Arbnor Morina	July 2013	7 October 2013	
4.	(Kosovo) Ramiz Krasniqi	7 October 2013	6 July 2014	
5.	(Kosovo) Gani Sejdiu	6 July 2014	7 December 2015	
6.	(Kosovo) Afrim Tovërlani	9 December 2015	April 2017	
7.	(Kosovo) Gani Sejdiu	13 July 2017	27 September 2017	
8.	(North Macedonia) (Albania) Zekirija Ramadani	1 October 2017	17 December 2017	
9.	(Kosovo) Ismet Munishi	17 December 2017	20 March 2018	
10.	(Albania) Sulejman Starova	20 March 2018	2 September 2018	
11.	(North Macedonia) (Albania) Zekirija Ramadani	3 September 2018	July 2019	
12.	(Montenegro) Dejan Vukićević	6 August 2019	October 2019	
13.	(North Macedonia) (Kosovo) (Sweden) Agim Sopi	1 November 2019	22 February 2020	
14.	(Kosovo) (Montenegro) Malsor Gjonbalaj	29 February 2020	5 March 2020	
15.	(Kosovo) Afrim Tovërlani	5 March 2020	5 October 2020	
16.	(Albania) Klodian Duro	6 October 2020	1 May 2021	
17.	(Kosovo) Faruk Elshani	1 May 2021	30 June 2022	—N/a
18.	(Kosovo) Granit Begolli	1 July 2022	13 June 2023	—N/a
19.	(North Macedonia) (Albania) Xhengiz Rexhepi	21 June 2023	28 December 2023	—N/a
20.	(Finland) (Kosovo) Shefki Kuqi	8 January 2024	26 August 2024	—N/a
21.	(Kosovo) Fidan Rexhepi	27 August 2024	30 August 2024	—N/a
22.	(Italy) Giovanni Colella	30 August 2024	18 February 2025	—N/a
22.	(Kosovo) Granit Dervisholli	21 February 2025		—N/a

== FC Feronikeli in Europe ==
Feronikeli will compete in the UEFA Champions League for the first time in the 2019–20 season, entering at the preliminary round. On 11 June 2019, in Nyon, the draw was held and Feronikeli were drawn against the Gibraltarian side Lincoln Red Imps. On 25 June 2019, Feronikeli beat the Gibraltarian side Lincoln Red Imps at Fadil Vokrri Stadium in Pristina.

After being eliminated from The New Saints, Feronikeli continued to play in the second qualifying round of UEFA Europa League. On 17 July 2019, Feronikeli learns the upcoming rival which was the champion of 2018–19 Slovak First Football League, Slovan Bratislava.

Season	Competition	Round	Opponent	Home	Away	Agg.
2019–20	UEFA Champions League	PR	(Gibraltar) Lincoln Red Imps	1–0		
2019–20	UEFA Champions League	PR	(Andorra) FC Santa Coloma	2–1		
2019–20	UEFA Champions League	1Q	(Wales) The New Saints	0−1	2–2	2–3
2019–20	UEFA Europa League	2Q	(Slovakia) Slovan Bratislava	0−2	1−2	1−4
