= List of football stadiums in Kosovo =

This is a list of football stadiums in Kosovo, ranked in order of capacity, with the minimum capacity being 1,000.

== Current stadiums ==
#	Image	Stadium	Capacity	City	Home team(s)	Opened	UEFA rank
1		Adem Jashari Olympic Stadium	18,500	Mitrovica	KF Trepça; KFF Mitrovica; Kosovo national teams	1938 Being renovated as of March 2026	4/4 stars
2		Fadil Vokrri Stadium	13,980	Prishtinë	FC Prishtina; Kosovo national teams	1953	4/4 stars
3		Shahin Haxhiislami Stadium	8,500	Pejë	Besa, Shqiponja	1938 Being Renovated	
4		Përparim Thaçi Stadium	7,000	Prizren	Liria	2000	
5		Rexhep Rexhepi Stadium	6,000	Drenas	Feronikeli	2012	
6		Riza Lushta Stadium	5,000	Mitrovicë	Trepça'89	1938	
7		Zahir Pajaziti Stadium	4,500	Podujevë	KF Llapi	2015	
8		Ferki Aliu Stadium	4,000	Vushtrri	Vushtrria		
9		Bajram Aliu Stadium	3,000	Skënderaj	Drenica		
10		Stadiumi ndihmës në Ferizaj	3,000	Ferizaj	Ferizaj		
11		Demush Mavraj Stadium	2,800	Istog	Istogu		
12		Sami Kelmendi Stadium	2,500	Lipjan	Lipjan		
13		Besnik Begunca Stadium	2,000	Kaçanik	Lepenci		
14		Liman Gegaj Stadium	2,000	Malishevë	Malishevë		
15		Agron Rama Stadium	1,500	Kastriot	KEK		
16		Flamurtari Stadium	1,500	Prishtinë	Flamurtari, Kosova Prishtinë		
17		Llukar Stadium	1,000	Prishtinë	Beselidhja		
18		Suva Reka City Stadium	1,500	Therandë	Ballkani		
19		Deçan City Stadium	1,500	Deçan	KF Deçani		
20		2 Korriku Sports Field	1,500	Prishtinë	2 Korriku		

== Stadiums under construction/renovation ==
Image	Stadium	Capacity	City	Home team(s)	Opening	UEFA rank
	Gjakova City Stadium	14,000	Gjakovë	Vëllaznimi	2027	4/4 stars
	Hajvalia Stadium	14,000	Hajvalia, Prishtinë	Hajvalia	2026	4/4 stars
	Gjilan City Stadium	9,050	Gjilan	Gjilani, Drita	2027	4/4 stars
	New Ferizaj Stadium	8,500	Ferizaj	FC Ferizaj	2028	3/4 stars
	New Suhareaka Stadium	6,500	Suhareka	KF Ballkani	2027	
	Shtime Stadium	2,500	Shtime	KF Vjosa	2025	

== Planned future stadiums ==
Image	Stadium	Capacity	City	Home team	Status	UEFA rank
	Kosovo National Stadium	30,000	Drenas	Kosovo national football team	TBD	4/4 stars
	New Peja Stadium	10,000	Pejë	KF Besa	TBD	3/4 stars

== See also ==
- List of association football stadiums by capacity
- List of stadiums in Europe
- List of European stadiums by capacity
- Lists of stadiums
