= Kosovar Supercup finals (1992–2019) =

This is a list of Kosovar Supercup finals from 1992 to 2019.

== Fixtures and results ==
=== 1992–1999 ===
1992 1st edition	Prishtina	N/A	Trepça	Kosovo
		Report

1993 2nd edition	Trepça	N/A	Flamurtari	Kosovo
		Report

1994 3rd edition	Dukagjini	0–0 (5–4 p)	Prishtina	Kosovo
		Report

1995 4th edition	Liria	N/A	Prishtina	Kosovo
		Report

1996 5th edition	Prishtina (as winners double)	Kosovo
	Report

1997 6th edition	Prishtina	N/A	2 Korriku	Kosovo
		Report

1998 7th edition	Not held	Kosovo
	Report

1999 8th edition	Not held	Kosovo
	Report

=== 2000–2009 ===
2000 9th edition	Prishtina	1–4	Gjilani	Kosovo
		Report

2001 10th edition	Prishtina	3–0	Drita	Kosovo
		Report

2002 11th edition	Besiana (as winners double)	Kosovo
	Report

16 August 2003 12th edition	Drita	1–2	KEK	Mitrovica, Kosovo
	Hasani 80'	Report	Ademi 54'; Hashani 85'	Stadium: Riza Lushta Stadium; Attendance: 1,500; Referee: Sokol Jareci (Albania)

20 August 2004 13th edition	Prishtina	4–0	Kosova (P)	Pristina, Kosovo
	Baliqi 69'; Humolli 87'; Bekteshi 90'; Curri 90+3' (pen.)	Report		Stadium: Pristina City Stadium; Attendance: 8,000; Referee: Muhedin Ferati (Kosovo)

2005 14th edition	Besa Pejë (as winners double)	Kosovo
	Report

13 August 2006 15th edition	Besa Pejë	1–3	Prishtina	Mitrovica, Kosovo
	Zeka 24'	Report	Zhjeçi 56'; Dushi 63'; Emra 84'	Stadium: Riza Lushta Stadium; Attendance: 3,000; Referee: Mustafa (Kosovo)

2007 16th edition	Besa Pejë (as winners double)	Kosovo
	Report

29 August 2008 17th edition	Prishtina	1–0	Vëllaznimi	Pristina, Kosovo
	Hyseni 27'	Report		Stadium: Pristina City Stadium; Attendance: 4,000; Referee: Muhedin Ferati (Kosovo)

10 August 2009 18th edition	Prishtina	5–2	Hysi	Pristina, Kosovo
		Report		Stadium: Pristina City Stadium

=== 2010–2019 ===
8 August 2010 19th edition	Trepça	2–0 (a.e.t.)	Liria	Obilić, Kosovo
	Osmani 97'; Sejdiu 98'	Report		Stadium: Agron Rama Stadium; Attendance: 500; Referee: Hasani (Kosovo)

13 August 2011 20th edition	Hysi	3–1	Besa Pejë	Mitrovica, Kosovo
	Zabërxha 42', 63'; Zhdrella 44' (pen.)	Report	Gacaferri 56'	Stadium: Adem Jashari Olympic Stadium; Attendance: 1,500; Referee: Domi (Kosovo)

12 August 2012 21st edition	Prishtina	0–1	Trepça'89	Peć, Kosovo
		Report		Stadium: Shahin Haxhiislami Stadium

2013 22nd edition	Prishtina (as winners double)	Kosovo
	Report

10 August 2014 23rd edition	Vushtrria	2–0	Feronikeli	Mitrovica, Kosovo
	Osmani 18' (pen.); Rashica 88'	Report		Stadium: Riza Lushta Stadium

2015 24th edition	Feronikeli (as winners double)	Kosovo
	Report

13 August 2016 25th edition	Feronikeli	1–2	Prishtina	Peć, Kosovo
	Maliqi 40' (pen.)	Report	Krasniqi 35'; Januzi 73'	Stadium: Shahin Haxhiislami Stadium

12 August 2017 26th edition	Trepça'89	5–0	Besa Pejë	Gjilan, Kosovo
	Chibueze 43'; Idrizi 57'; Arb. Muja 78'; Hasani 85'; John 90+1'	Report		Stadium: Gjilan City Stadium

13 August 2018 27th edition	Drita	2–1	Prishtina	Pristina, Kosovo
20:00	Gërbeshi 64' (pen.); Haxhimusa 82'	Report	Mankenda 34'	Stadium: Fadil Vokrri Stadium; Attendance: 10,000; Referee: Genc Nuza (Kosovo)

2019 28th edition	Feronikeli (as winners double)	Kosovo
	Report

== Notes and references ==
=== Notes ===
1. If a Supercup was organised in 1992, presumably the cup winners Trepça defeated champions Prishtina, who certainly did not win it that year.
2. If a Supercup was organised in 1993, it should have been contested by champions Trepça and cup winners Flamurtari.
3. If (as is likely) a Supercup was organised in 1997, cup winners 2 Korriku, presumably defeated champions Prishtina, who certainly did not win it that year.
4. Competition not held due to Kosovo War.
