= List of Kosovo international footballers =

Players of the Kosovo national football team

The Kosovo national football team played its first official international match on 5 March 2014, drawing 0–0 to Haiti in Mitrovica. In total, 125 players have represented the Kosovo national team. The players are initially ordered by number of caps. All statistics are correct up to and including the match played on 5 June 2024 against Sweden.

== Players ==
As of 1 October 2026

- A yellow background indicates the most recent match.
- Players in **bold** are called up to the squad in last 12 months and are still active at international level.
- Players with flags in front of their name are players who represented Kosovo, but now represent another national team.
- Player is not available at international level due to FIFA eligibility rules.

Name	Pos.	Caps	Goals	First cap		Last cap		Ref
Name	Pos.	Caps	Goals	Opponent	Date	Opponent	Date	Ref
=== 10+ caps ===
**Mërgim Vojvoda**	DF	78	3	Turkey	11 June 2017	Israel	1 October 2026	
**Vedat Muriqi**	FW	70	33	Ukraine	9 October 2016	Austria	27 September 2026	
**Amir Rrahmani**	DF	67	7	Senegal	25 May 2014	Switzerland	18 November 2025	
**Milot Rashica**	MF	66	12	Finland	5 September 2016	Israel	1 October 2026	
**Fidan Aliti**	DF	64	1	Turkey	11 June 2017	Turkey	31 March 2026	
**Arijanet Muric**	GK	53	0	Azerbaijan	20 November 2018	Austria	27 September 2026	
**Valon Berisha**	MF	52	4	Finland	5 September 2016	Switzerland	18 November 2025	
**Edon Zhegrova**	MF	49	6	Madagascar	24 March 2018	Israel	1 October 2026	
**Florent Muslija**	MF	40	3	Czech Republic	7 September 2019	Turkey	31 March 2026	
**Florent Hadergjonaj**	DF	39	1	Bulgaria	10 June 2019	Slovakia	26 March 2026	
Bersant Celina	MF	38	2	Oman	7 September 2014	Hungary	26 March 2024	
Leart Paqarada	DF	37	1	Oman	7 September 2014	Switzerland	5 September 2025	
Samir Ujkani	GK	36	0	Haiti	5 March 2014	Cyprus	27 September 2022	
Besar Halimi	MF	34	3	Equatorial Guinea	10 October 2015	Greece	14 November 2021	
Arbër Zeneli	MF	33	9	Croatia	6 October 2016	Andorra	28 March 2023	
Hekuran Kryeziu	MF	30	0	Albania	13 November 2015	Belarus	19 June 2023	
Elbasan Rashani	FW	29	5	Albania	13 November 2015	Norway	5 June 2024	
Bernard Berisha	MF	27	1	Equatorial Guinea	10 October 2015	Norway	5 June 2024	
Herolind Shala	MF	27	0	Croatia	6 October 2016	Greece	14 November 2021	
Zymer Bytyqi	MF	26	1	Haiti	5 March 2014	Lithuania	18 November 2024	
**Lumbardh Dellova**	DF	26	3	Burkina Faso	24 March 2022	Israel	1 October 2026	
**Albion Rrahmani**	FW	25	7	Romania	12 September 2023	Israel	1 October 2026	
Ibrahim Drešević	DF	25	0	Gibraltar	10 October 2019	Romania	12 September 2023	
Benjamin Kololli	MF	24	4	Turkey	12 November 2016	Greece	5 June 2022	
Florian Loshaj	MF	24	0	Sweden	12 January 2020	Hungary	26 March 2024	
Betim Fazliji	DF	23	0	Albania	11 November 2020	Andorra	7 June 2026	
**Ilir Krasniqi**	MF	22	0	Cyprus	27 September 2022	Israel	1 October 2026	
**Fisnik Asllani**	FW	19	4	Romania	6 September 2024	Israel	1 October 2026	
Atdhe Nuhiu	FW	19	3	Iceland	24 March 2017	North Macedonia	8 October 2020	
**Donat Rrudhani**	MF	19	2	Guinea	8 June 2021	Comoros	9 June 2025	
Lirim M. Kastrati	FW	19	2	Malta	11 October 2018	Faroe Islands	19 November 2022	
**Elvis Rexhbecaj**	MF	18	2	Romania	6 September 2024	Andorra	7 June 2026	
**Ermal Krasniqi**	FW	18	2	Faroe Islands	19 November 2022	Israel	1 October 2026	
**Dion Gallapeni**	DF	16	0	Iceland	23 March 2025	Israel	1 October 2026	
**Lindon Emërllahu**	MF	15	2	Cyprus	27 September 2022	Andorra	7 June 2026	
**Muharrem Jashari**	MF	15	1	Guinea	8 June 2021	Israel	1 October 2026	
Idriz Voca	MF	15	0	Madagascar	24 March 2018	Malta	4 June 2021	
Lirim R. Kastrati	DF	15	0	Iceland	9 October 2017	Belarus	21 November 2023	
Anel Rashkaj	MF	14	0	Haiti	5 March 2014	Slovenia	15 November 2020	
Fanol Përdedaj	MF	12	0	Haiti	5 March 2014	Albania	29 May 2018	
**Veldin Hodza**	MF	11	1	Sweden	8 September 2025	Israel	1 October 2026	
**Visar Bekaj**	GK	11	0	Albania	13 November 2015	Andorra	7 June 2026	
Mirlind Kryeziu	DF	10	0	Georgia	2 September 2021	Andorra	28 March 2023	
Enis Alushi	MF	10	0	Haiti	5 March 2014	Finland	5 September 2017	
**Leon Avdullahu**	MF	10	0	Switzerland	5 September 2025	Israel	1 October 2026	
=== 1–9 caps ===
Blendi Idrizi	MF	9	0	San Marino	1 June 2021	Norway	5 June 2024	
Florent Hasani	MF	8	1	England	10 September 2019	Slovenia	15 November 2020	
Alban Pnishi	DF	8	0	Albania	13 November 2015	Iceland	9 October 2017	
Bajram Jashanica	DF	8	0	Turkey	21 May 2014	Guinea	8 June 2021	
**Albian Hajdari**	DF	8	0	Switzerland	10 October 2025	Republic of Ireland	24 September 2026	
**Baton Zabërgja**	FW	8	0	Armenia	6 June 2025	Austria	27 September 2026	
**Kreshnik Hajrizi**	DF	7	1	Faroe Islands	19 November 2022	Turkey	31 March 2026	
Emir Sahiti	MF	7	1	Northern Ireland	9 June 2022	Iceland	23 March 2025	
Albert Bunjaku	FW	6	3	Haiti	5 March 2014	Croatia	6 October 2016	
Donis Avdijaj	FW	6	2	Iceland	24 March 2017	Malta	17 November 2018	
**Meriton Korenica**	MF	6	0	Switzerland	9 September 2023	Comoros	9 June 2025	
Jetmir Topalli	FW	6	0	Sweden	12 January 2020	Romania	16 June 2023	
**Amir Saipi**	GK	6	0	Lithuania	12 October 2024	Israel	1 October 2026	
Astrit Selmani	FW	5	1	Sweden	9 October 2021	Burkina Faso	24 March 2022	
**Vesel Demaku**	MF	5	0	Kosovo	20 March 2025	Andorra	7 June 2026	
(Albania) Mirlind Daku	FW	5	0	Albania	11 November 2020	Gambia	11 June 2021	
Armend Thaqi	DF	5	0	Latvia	13 November 2017	Gambia	11 June 2021	
Flamur Kastrati	FW	5	0	Haiti	5 March 2014	Sweden	12 January 2020	
Avni Pepa	DF	5	0	Haiti	5 March 2014	Croatia	6 October 2016	
Toni Domgjoni	MF	4	1	Burkina Faso	24 March 2022	Greece	12 June 2022	
**Valmir Matoshi**	MF	4	1	Czech Republic	31 May 2026	Israel	1 October 2026	
Qëndrim Zyba	MF	4	0	Andorra	12 October 2023	Belarus	21 November 2023	
Destan Bajselmani	DF	4	0	San Marino	1 June 2021	Gambia	11 June 2021	
Valmir Sulejmani	FW	4	0	Equatorial Guinea	10 October 2015	San Marino	1 June 2021	
Eroll Zejnullahu	MF	4	0	Senegal	25 May 2014	Gambia	11 June 2021	
(Albania) Loret Sadiku	MF	4	0	Haiti	5 March 2014	Albania	13 November 2015	
Shpëtim Hasani	FW	4	0	Haiti	5 March 2014	Albania	13 November 2015	
Kristian Nushi	MF	4	0	Haiti	5 March 2014	Oman	7 September 2014	
**Ron Raçi**	DF	4	0	Comoros	9 June 2025	Austria	27 September 2026	
Altin Zeqiri	MF	3	1	Andorra	12 October 2023	Belarus	21 November 2023	
(Albania) Arbër Hoxha	FW	3	1	Sweden	12 January 2020	Gambia	11 June 2021	
Arb Manaj	FW	3	1	Sweden	12 January 2020	Gambia	11 June 2021	
Imran Bunjaku	MF	3	1	Senegal	25 May 2014	Equatorial Guinea	10 October 2015	
David Domgjoni	DF	3	0	Guinea	8 June 2021	Sweden	9 October 2021	
Blendi Baftiu	MF	3	0	Sweden	12 January 2020	Gambia	11 June 2021	
Rron Broja	MF	3	0	Sweden	12 January 2020	Gambia	11 June 2021	
Lum Rexhepi	DF	3	0	Haiti	5 March 2014	Faroe Islands	3 June 2016	
Ilir Berisha	DF	3	0	Oman	7 September 2014	Albania	13 November 2015	
(Malaysia) Liridon Krasniqi	MF	3	0	Haiti	5 March 2014	Equatorial Guinea	10 October 2015	
Shkodran Metaj	MF	3	0	Turkey	21 May 2014	Oman	7 September 2014	
Dardan Rexhepi	FW	3	0	Turkey	21 May 2014	Oman	7 September 2014	
Faton Toski	MF	3	0	Haiti	5 March 2014	Senegal	25 May 2014	
Mërgim Brahimi	MF	2	2	Equatorial Guinea	10 October 2015	Albania	13 November 2015	
Muhamet Hyseni	FW	2	1	Switzerland	18 November 2023	Belarus	21 November 2023	
(Switzerland) Uran Bislimi	MF	2	1	Armenia	16 November 2022	Faroe Islands	19 November 2022	
**Florian Haxha**	FW	2	0	Armenia	6 June 2025	Comoros	9 June 2025	
(Finland) Agon Sadiku	FW	2	0	Armenia	16 November 2022	Faroe Islands	19 November 2022	
Arianit Ferati	MF	2	0	Armenia	16 November 2022	Faroe Islands	19 November 2022	
**Leard Sadriu**	DF	2	0	Armenia	16 November 2022	Slovenia	10 October 2025	
Liridon Balaj	MF	2	0	Guinea	8 June 2021	Gambia	11 June 2021	
Lavdrim Hajrulahu	DF	2	0	Guinea	8 June 2021	Gambia	11 June 2021	
Mersim Asllani	MF	2	0	Guinea	8 June 2021	Gambia	11 June 2021	
Valmir Veliu	MF	2	0	Sweden	12 January 2020	Armenia	16 November 2022	
**Ismet Lushaku**	MF	2	0	Sweden	12 January 2020	Comoros	9 June 2025	
Ardin Dallku	DF	2	0	Latvia	13 November 2017	Faroe Islands	29 May 2018	
Gjelbrim Taipi	MF	2	0	Burkina Faso	27 March 2018	Albania	29 May 2018	
Erton Fejzullahu	FW	2	0	Equatorial Guinea	10 October 2015	Croatia	2 September 2017	
Alban Meha	MF	2	0	Finland	5 September 2016	Ukraine	9 October 2016	
Denis Markaj	DF	2	0	Oman	7 September 2014	Albania	13 November 2015	
(Germany) Enis Bunjaki	FW	2	0	Senegal	25 May 2014	Oman	7 September 2014	
Ardian Gashi	MF	2	0	Haiti	5 March 2014	Oman	7 September 2014	
Kushtrim Mushica	GK	2	0	Turkey	21 May 2014	Senegal	25 May 2014	
Yll Hoxha	DF	2	0	Turkey	21 May 2014	Senegal	25 May 2014	
Alban Bunjaku	MF	2	0	Turkey	21 May 2014	Senegal	25 May 2014	
(Albania) Albion Avdijaj	FW	2	0	Turkey	21 May 2014	Senegal	25 May 2014	
Mentor Zhdrella	MF	2	0	Turkey	21 May 2014	Senegal	25 May 2014	
**Milot Avdyli**	MF	2	0	Austria	27 September 2026	Israel	1 October 2026	
**Dion Kacuri**	MF	1	0	Israel, 1 October 2026				
**Erblin Osmani**	MF	1	0	Republic of Ireland, 24 September 2026				
**Dardan Shabanhaxhaj**	FW	1	0	Andorra, 7 June 2026				
**Rilind Nivokazi**	FW	1	0	Czech Republic, 31 May 2026				
**Bledian Krasniqi**	MF	1	0	Comoros, 9 June 2025				
**Andi Hoti**	DF	1	0	Lithuania, 18 November 2024				
Eliot Bujupi	FW	1	0	Cyprus, 9 September 2024				
Art Smakaj	MF	1	0	Norway, 5 June 2024				
Alban Ajdini	MF	1	0	Belarus, 21 November 2023				
Ismajl Beka	DF	1	0	Romania, 12 September 2023				
Jozef Pukaj	GK	1	0	Faroe Islands, 19 November 2022				
Eris Abedini	MF	1	0	Armenia, 16 November 2022				
Jetmir Haliti	DF	1	0	Armenia, 16 November 2022				
Betim Halimi	GK	1	0	Gambia, 11 June 2021				
Lorik Emini	MF	1	0	San Marino, 1 June 2021				
Lapidar Lladrovci	DF	1	0	Sweden, 12 January 2020				
Leotrim Bekteshi	DF	1	0	Sweden, 12 January 2020				
Ylldren Ibrahimaj	MF	1	0	Sweden, 12 January 2020				
Arbenit Xhemajli	DF	1	0	Gibraltar, 10 October 2019				
Shkelqim Demhasaj	FW	1	0	Malta, 17 November 2018				
(Albania) Ardian Ismajli	DF	1	0	Albania, 29 May 2018				
Jetmir Krasniqi	DF	1	0	Albania, 29 May 2018				
Bledar Hajdini	GK	1	0	Latvia, 13 November 2017				
Suad Sahiti	MF	1	0	Latvia, 13 November 2017				
Besar Musolli	MF	1	0	Ukraine, 6 October 2017				
Adis Nurković	GK	1	0	Turkey, 11 June 2017				
Besart Berisha	FW	1	0	Iceland, 24 March 2017				
Leonit Abazi	MF	1	0	Equatorial Guinea, 10 October 2015				
Kushtrim Lushtaku	MF	1	0	Oman, 7 September 2014				
Julian Bibleka	GK	1	0	Senegal, 25 May 2014				
(Albania) Debatik Curri	DF	1	0	Turkey, 21 May 2014				
(Finland) Mehmet Hetemaj	MF	1	0	Turkey, 21 May 2014				
Ilir Azemi	FW	1	0	Haiti, 5 March 2014				
