= 2017–18 Football Superleague of Kosovo =

Football Superleague of Kosovo
- Season: 2017–18
- Dates: 18 August 2017 – 20 May 2018
- Champions: Drita (2nd title)
- Relegated: Vllaznia Pozheran; Besa Pejë; Vëllaznimi
- Champions League: Drita
- Europa League: Prishtina
- Matches: 209
- Goals: 469 (2.24 per match)
- Top goalscorer: Otto John; Mirlind Daku (16 goals each)
- Biggest home win: Drenica 6–2 Vllaznia Pozheran (28 April 2018)
- Biggest away win: Besa Pejë 1–6 Llapi (22 November 2017)
- Highest scoring: Drenica 6–2 Vllaznia Pozheran (28 April 2018)
- Longest winning run: 28 matches Drita
- Longest unbeaten run: 18 matches Prishtina
- Longest winless run: 25 matches Vllaznia Pozheran
- Longest losing run: 25 matches Vllaznia Pozheran
- All statistics correct as of 20 May 2018.

The 2017–18 Football Superleague of Kosovo season, also known as the Vala Superleague of Kosovo for sponsorship reasons, was the 19th season of top-tier football in Kosovo. The season began on 18 August 2017 and concluded on 20 May 2018. Trepça'89 are the defending champions from the previous season. A total of 12 teams are competing in the league: nine teams from the 2016–17 season and three promoted from the 2016–17 First League.

== Teams and stadiums ==
Locations of the 2017–18 Football Superleague of Kosovo teams

Trepça and Hajvalia were relegated after finishing the previous season in eleventh and twelfth-place respectively. They were replaced by the champions and runners-up of the 2016–17 First League, Flamurtari and Vëllaznimi respectively. Vllaznia Pozheran defeated Ferizaj in a play-off to claim their top-flight spot.

Note: Table lists in alphabetical order.

Club	Town	Stadium	UEFA license
Besa Pejë	Peć	Shahin Haxhiislami Stadium	No
Drenica	Skenderaj	Bajram Aliu Stadium	No
Drita	Gjilan	Gjilan City Stadium	Yes
Feronikeli	Glogovac	Rexhep Rexhepi Stadium	No
Flamurtari	Pristina	Fadil Vokrri Stadium	No
Gjilani	Gjilan	Gjilan City Stadium	Yes
Liria	Prizren	Përparim Thaçi Stadium	Yes
Llapi	Podujevo	Zahir Pajaziti City Stadium	Yes
Prishtina	Pristina	Fadil Vokrri Stadium	Yes
Trepça'89	Mitrovica	Riza Lushta Stadium	Yes
Vëllaznimi	Gjakova	Gjakova City Stadium	No
Vllaznia Pozheran	Požaranje	Gjilan City Stadium	No

Source:Scoresway

== League table ==
Pos	Team	Pld	W	D	L	GF	GA	GD	Pts	Qualification or relegation
1	Drita (C)	33	18	13	2	53	21	+32	67	Qualification for the Champions League preliminary round
2	Prishtina	33	18	10	5	39	18	+21	64	Qualification for the Europa League preliminary round
3	Llapi	33	16	6	11	51	41	+10	54	
4	Trepça'89	33	14	11	8	41	25	+16	53	
5	Liria	33	13	9	11	34	30	+4	48	
6	Feronikeli	33	10	18	5	32	18	+14	48	
7	Drenica	33	13	9	11	34	27	+7	48	
8	Gjilani	33	10	16	7	29	21	+8	46	
9	Vëllaznimi (R)	33	10	14	9	29	28	+1	44	Qualification for the relegation play-offs
10	Flamurtari (O)	33	6	7	20	28	53	−25	25	Qualification for the relegation play-offs
11	Besa Pejë (R)	33	6	4	23	28	64	−36	22	Relegation to First Football League of Kosovo
12	Vllaznia Pozheran (R)	33	3	5	25	16	68	−52	14	Relegation to First Football League of Kosovo

Source: Football Federation of Kosovo (in Albanian), Soccerway
Rules for classification: 1) Points; 2) Goal difference; 3) Goal scored; 4) Head-to-head points; 5) Head-to-Head goal difference; 6) Head-to-Head away goal scored; 7) Head-to-Head goal scored; 8) Play-offs (only if needed to decide champion or teams for relegation).
(C) Champions; (O) Play-off winners; (R) Relegated

== Results ==
Each team plays three times against every opponent (either twice at home and once away or once at home and twice away) for a total of 33 games played each.

=== Matches 1–22 ===
Home \ Away	BES	DRE	DRI	FRN	FLA	GJI	LIR	LLA	PRI	T89	VËL	VLL
Besa Pejë	—	0–2	2–0	0–5	2–0	0–0	2–0	1–6	1–3	0–1	1–2	3–1
Drenica	2–2	—	0–0	0–0	4–1	1–0	1–0	1–2	1–1	1–0	1–0	1–0
Drita	2–0	3–0	—	1–0	0–0	1–1	4–3	3–1	0–0	1–1	1–1	3–0
Feronikeli	2–1	1–0	1–1	—	1–0	2–1	0–1	0–0	0–0	0–1	3–0	1–0
Flamurtari	3–1	1–2	1–1	2–2	—	0–1	0–0	2–1	0–2	2–2	0–3	2–1
Gjilani	2–1	2–1	0–0	1–1	1–0	—	1–0	2–0	0–0	0–0	1–1	1–0
Liria	3–0	1–0	2–0	1–0	2–0	0–0	—	3–0	1–0	1–0	2–2	2–1
Llapi	2–0	1–0	0–1	1–1	1–0	1–1	0–2	—	3–0	0–0	2–0	4–1
Prishtina	4–0	0–2	0–1	0–0	3–1	2–1	1–0	2–0	—	2–0	1–0	2–1
Trepça'89	3–0	1–0	1–1	0–0	3–1	1–2	2–0	3–1	0–2	—	1–0	2–0
Vëllaznimi	1–0	1–1	1–1	0–0	2–0	0–0	1–0	0–3	0–0	0–0	—	3–0
Vllaznia Pozheran	1–0	0–0	0–4	0–3	2–0	0–0	0–0	0–1	0–2	2–1	1–2	—

Source: Football Federation of Kosovo (in Albanian)
Legend: Blue = home team win; Yellow = draw; Red = away team win.

=== Matches 23–33 ===
Home \ Away	BES	DRE	DRI	FRN	FLA	GJI	LIR	LLA	PRI	T89	VËL	VLL
Besa Pejë	—	0–1	0–2	—	0–4	1–0	—	3–4	—	—	—	—
Drenica	—	—	—	0–0	2–0	—	1–1	—	1–0	—	—	6–2
Drita	—	3–1	—	3–1	3–1	—	3–0	—	—	3–1	—	2–0
Feronikeli	2–1	—	—	—	—	—	0–0	2–2	0–0	0–0	1–1	—
Flamurtari	—	—	—	0–3	—	—	1–2	—	0–2	—	1–0	4–1
Gjilani	—	1–1	1–1	0–0	0–0	—	—	—	—	2–0	—	4–0
Liria	2–2	—	—	—	—	3–2	—	1–2	0–1	0–2	1–1	—
Llapi	—	1–0	1–3	—	3–1	1–0	—	—	—	3–3	—	2–0
Prishtina	1–0	—	0–0	—	—	2–1	—	3–2	—	0–0	2–2	—
Trepça'89	2–0	1–0	—	—	0–0	—	—	—	—	—	3–0	6–1
Vëllaznimi	0–0	1–0	0–1	—	—	0–0	—	2–0	—	—	—	—
Vllaznia Pozheran	1–4	—	—	0–0	—	—	0–0	—	0–1	—	0–2	—

Source: Football Federation of Kosovo (in Albanian)
Legend: Blue = home team win; Yellow = draw; Red = away team win.

=== Relegation play-offs ===
The ninth and tenth-placed teams, Vëllaznimi and Flamurtari respectively, each paired off against the third and fourth-placed teams from the 2017–18 First Football League of Kosovo season, Vushtrria and Ferizaj respectively; the two winners will play in the top-flight next season. As with previous seasons, both play-offs will be played on neutral ground.

23 May 2018
16:00 (CEST)

Vushtrria	1–1 (a.e.t.)	Flamurtari
J. Topalli 83'	Report	A. Ajzeraj 14'
Penalties
(penalty scored) L. Osmani; (penalty scored) A. Prishtina; (penalty scored) F. Ibrahimi; (penalty scored) E. Halimi; (penalty scored) D. Maxhuni; (penalty missed) D. Dragusha	5–6	(penalty scored) A. Azemi; (penalty scored) V. Shabani; (penalty scored) S. Sahiti; (penalty scored) G. Ahmeti; (penalty scored) A. Ajzeraj; (penalty scored) A. Shillova

Rexhep Rexhepi Stadium, Glogovac
Referee: B. Batalli

Flamurtari retained their spot in 2018–19 Football Superleague of Kosovo; Vushtrria remained in 2018–19 First Football League of Kosovo.

24 May 2018
16:00 (CEST)

Ferizaj	0–0 (a.e.t.)	Vëllaznimi
	Report
Penalties
(penalty missed) B. Shabani; (penalty missed) E. Hashani; (penalty scored) D. Qerkini; (penalty scored) F. Berisha; (penalty scored) F. Guraziu	3–2	(penalty scored) L. Vula; (penalty missed) T. Bardhoku; (penalty missed) R. Asare; (penalty scored) B. Qorri; (penalty missed) B. Krasniqi

Rexhep Rexhepi Stadium, Glogovac

Ferizaj were promoted to 2018–19 Football Superleague of Kosovo; Vëllaznimi were relegated to 2018–19 First Football League of Kosovo.

== Season statistics ==
=== Scoring ===
==== Top scorers ====
As of matches played on 20 May 2018.

Rank	Player	Club	Goals
1	(Nigeria) Otto John	Trepça'89	17
1	(Kosovo) Mirlind Daku	Llapi	17
2	(Albania) Artur Magani	Liria	13
2	(Kosovo) Kastriot Rexha	Drita	13
3	(Kosovo) Genc Hamiti	Drenica	12
4	(Kosovo) Xhevdet Shabani	Drita	10
4	(Kosovo) Betim Haxhimusa	Gjilani	10
5	(Kosovo) Mark Milicaj	Feronikeli	8
5	(Kosovo) Albutrint Morina	Feronikeli	8
5	(Albania) Ahmed Januzi	Prishtina	8
6	(Kosovo) Fetim Kasapi	Besa Pejë	7
6	(Kosovo) Fidan Gërbeshi	Drita	7
6	(Kosovo) Mendurim Hoti	Feronikeli	7
6	(Democratic Republic of the Congo) Gauthier Mankenda	Prishtina	7
7	(Kosovo) Mentor Zhdrella	Llapi	6
7	(Kosovo) Florim Bërbatovci	Llapi	6
7	(Kosovo) Florent Hasani	Trepça'89	6
8	(Kosovo) Alban Shillova	Flamurtari	5
8	(Kosovo) Armend Thaqi	Gjilani	5
8	(Kosovo) Gëzim Rusi	Gjilani	5
8	(Kosovo) Hamdi Namani	Llapi	5
8	(Kosovo) Semir Zeneli	Vëllaznimi	5
8	(Albania) Denis Peposhi	Drenica	5
9	(Albania) Ardit Jaupaj	Flamurtari	4
9	(Albania) Zenel Gavazaj	Liria	4
9	(Kosovo) Gentrit Begolli	Llapi	4
9	(Kosovo) Altin Merlaku	Llapi	4
9	(Albania) Armend Dallku	Prishtina	4
9	(Kosovo) Shpëtim Idrizi	Trepça'89	4
9	(Kosovo) Lekë Vula	Vëllaznimi	4
9	(Kosovo) Almedin Murati	Vllaznia Pozheran	4

== Notes and references ==
=== Notes ===
1. This season was the 19th season under the name Football Superleague of Kosovo, the 25th season of top-tier football in Kosovo and the 71st season of football in Kosovo overall.
2. The two teams, Drita and Gjilan, which use this stadium together with their fans, have named the stadium with different names. Drita and their fans call the stadium as Selami Osmani-Bezi Stadium, while Gjilan and their fans call the stadium as Agim Ramadani Stadium, but officially the stadium is called Gjilan City Stadium.
3. Match awarded 3–0 to Vëllaznimi due to crowd violence caused by the Flamurtari fans; the match was abandoned in the 90th minute, with the result being 1–1.
