= 2015–16 Football Superleague of Kosovo =

Football Superleague of Kosovo
- Season: 2015–16
- Champions: Feronikeli
- Relegated: Kosova Vushtrri; Istogu
- Matches: 198
- Goals: 443 (2.24 per match)
- Top goalscorer: Kastriot Rexha (12)
- Biggest home win: Trepça'89 6–0 Liria (8 May 2016)
- Biggest away win: Drencia 0–4 Drita (23 April 2016); Drita 0–4 Trepça'89 (11 May 2016)
- Highest scoring: Drencia 6–2 Kosova Vushtrri (11 May 2016)
- All statistics correct as of 1 May 2016.

The 2015–16 Football Superleague of Kosovo was the 17th (Note: This season was the 17th season under the name Football Superleague of Kosovo, the 23rd season of top-tier football in Kosovo and the 69th season of football in Kosovo overall.) season of football in Kosovo. The season began on 22 August 2015 and ended on 22 May 2016; the relegation play-offs were on 1/2 June 2016. Feronikeli were the defending champions.

A total of 12 teams competed in the league: nine sides from the 2014–15 season and three promoted from the Liga e Parë campaign. Liria, Gjilani and Llapi were each promoted to the top-flight.

== Teams ==
Location of the 2015–16 Football Superleague of Kosovo teams

Club	Town	Stadium
KF Liria	Prizren	Përparim Thaçi Stadium
KF Drenica	Skenderaj	Bajram Aliu Stadium
FC Drita	Gjilan	Gjilan City Stadium (Note: The two teams, Drita and Gjilan, which use this stadium together with their fans, have named the stadium with different names. Drita and their fans call the stadium as Selami Osmani-Bezi Stadium, while Gjilan and their fans call the stadium as Agim Ramadani Stadium, but officially the stadium is called Gjilan City Stadium.)
KF Llapi	Podujevo	Zahir Pajaziti Stadium
KF Feronikeli	Glogovac	Rexhep Rexhepi Stadium
SC Gjilani	Gjilan	Gjilan City Stadium
KF Hajvalia	Hajvalia	Hajvalia Stadium
KF Istogu	Istok	Demush Mavraj Stadium
KF Kosova Vushtrri	Vushtrri	Ferki Aliu Stadium
FC Prishtina	Pristina	Fadil Vokrri Stadium
KF Besa Pejë	Peć	Shahin Haxhiislami Stadium
KF Trepça'89	Mitrovica	Riza Lushta Stadium

== League table ==
Pos	Team	Pld	W	D	L	GF	GA	GD	Pts	Relegation
1	Feronikeli (C)	33	21	6	6	53	27	+26	69	
2	Hajvalia	33	17	8	8	44	26	+18	59	
3	Trepça'89	33	16	8	9	53	30	+23	56	
4	Besa	33	16	5	12	37	27	+10	53	
5	Gjilani	33	14	7	12	29	27	+2	49	
6	Llapi	33	12	8	13	44	44	0	44	
7	Liria	33	12	8	13	35	45	−10	44	
8	Prishtina	33	12	7	14	29	34	−5	43	
9	Drenica (O)	33	12	4	17	38	48	−10	40	Qualification for the relegation play-offs
10	Drita (O)	33	9	9	15	33	43	−10	36	Qualification for the relegation play-offs
11	Istogu (R)	33	10	4	19	24	40	−16	34	Relegation to Liga e Parë
12	Vushtrria (R)	33	6	8	19	24	52	−28	26	Relegation to Liga e Parë

Source: Football Federation of Kosovo (in Albanian), Soccerway
Rules for classification: 1) Points; 2) Goal difference; 3) Goal scored; 4) Head-to-head points; 5) Head-to-Head goal difference; 6) Head-to-Head away goal scored; 7) Head-to-Head goal scored; 8) Play-offs (only if needed to decide champion or teams for relegation).
(C) Champions; (O) Play-off winners; (R) Relegated

With Kosovo's admittance to FIFA and UEFA on 3 May 2016, UEFA evaluated the Raiffeisen Superliga's readiness to enter the UEFA Champions League for its 2016–17 season. Later, UEFA decided not to allow them to play in the Champions League just yet.

== Results ==
=== Matches 1–22 ===
Home \ Away	BES	DRE	DRT	FRN	GJI	HAJ	IST	KSV	LIR	LLA	PRI	T89
Besa		3–1	2–0	2–1	0–0	1–0	1–0	0–0	3–0	0–0	3–0	1–0
Drenica	3–1		1–0	1–0	1–2	1–3	1–1	2–1	2–0	2–1	1–0	1–1
Drita	1–0	0–1		1–1	0–3	1–0	1–0	5–1	1–1	2–2	1–0	1–1
Feronikeli	2–1	2–1	1–0		1–1	0–0	3–1	1–0	3–0	1–0	3–1	1–1
Gjilani	1–0	1–0	0–2	1–0		0–0	2–1	2–0	3–1	1–1	0–0	0–1
Hajvalia	2–0	1–2	2–1	3–2	2–0		1–0	0–0	3–0	1–0	1–0	3–0
Istogu	1–0	2–1	2–0	0–0	1–0	1–3		4–0	1–3	0–1	0–0	0–2
Kosova Vushtrri	0–1	1–0	2–0	1–3	0–1	1–0	1–0		1–1	0–1	1–1	0–0
Liria	3–1	1–1	1–0	2–3	1–0	0–0	1–0	1–1		5–2	1–1	2–0
Llapi	1–0	2–1	3–3	1–0	1–1	1–1	5–0	1–0	1–0		2–0	1–2
Prishtina	0–1	1–1	1–1	0–1	1–0	1–2	1–0	1–0	2–0	2–1		3–2
Trepça'89	2–1	2–0	5–1	1–3	0–1	2–0	4–0	0–2	1–1	1–2	2–0	

Source: Football Federation of Kosovo (in Albanian)
Legend: Blue = home team win; Yellow = draw; Red = away team win.

=== Matches 23–33 ===
Home \ Away	BES	DRE	DRT	FRN	GJI	HAJ	IST	KSV	LIR	LLA	PRI	T89
Besa		3–0	1–0			3–2		2–0		2–0		0–0
Drenica			0–4				2–1	6–2	2–0		0–1	
Drita				0–2	0–1			3–1	1–0			0–4
Feronikeli	3–1	3–1					3–0		2–0	2–1	1–0	
Gjilani	0–0	2–1		0–1			1–0		0–1		0–1	
Hajvalia		1–0	0–0	2–2	3–1			4–1				1–0
Istogu	1–0		0–0			1–0		3–1		2–0		
Kosova Vushtrri				0–1	2–0				0–0		2–3	2–2
Liria	2–1					3–0	0–1			3–2	1–0	
Llapi		3–1	1–1		1–3	1–3		3–0				1–1
Prishtina	1–2		3–2			0–0	1–0			3–1		
Trepça'89		2–0		3–1	3–1		1–0		6–0		1–0	

Source: Football Federation of Kosovo (in Albanian)
Legend: Blue = home team win; Yellow = draw; Red = away team win.

=== Relegation play-offs ===
The ninth and tenth-placed teams (Drenica and Drita respectively) played the third and fourth-placed teams (Flamurtari and Dukagjini respectively) from the 2015–16 Liga e Parë; the two winners will play in the top-flight next season.

1 June 2016
16:00

Drenica	2–1	Dukagjini
Tahiri 58'; Syla 83'	Report	Merlaku 63'

Riza Lushta Stadium, Mitrovica

2 June 2016
16:00

Drita	1–1 (a.e.t.)	Flamurtari
Haliti 90+2'	Report	Krasniqi 34'
Penalties
	4–2

Rexhep Rexhepi Stadium, Glogovac
