= 2014–15 Football Superleague of Kosovo =

Raiffeisen Superliga
- Season: 2014–15
- Champions: Feronikeli
- Relegated: Trepça, Ferizaj, Vëllaznimi
- Matches: 198
- Goals: 453 (2.29 per match)
- Biggest home win: Kosova (V) 5–0 Istogu (31 August 2014); Drenica 5–0 Drita (12 September 2014); Vëllaznimi 5–0 Besa (14 September 2014)
- Biggest away win: Feronikeli 2–5 Hajvalia (17 August 2014); Ferizaj 0–3 Hajvalia (12 September 2014); Trepça 0–3 Prishtina (28 September 2014); Trepça 0–3 Trepça 89 (26 April 2015)
- Highest scoring: Feronikeli 2–5 Hajvalia (17 August 2014); Trepça 89 4–3 Istogu (16 October 2014)

Raiffeisen Superliga 2014–15 was the 16th (Note: This season was the 16th season under the name Football Superleague of Kosovo, the 22nd season of top-tier football in Kosovo and the 68th season of football in Kosovo overall.) season of top-tier football in Kosovo. The season began on 16 August 2014. Kosova (V) are the defending champions.

A total of 12 teams competed in the league: 10 sides from the 2013–14 season and two promoted from the Liga e Parë campaign. Vëllaznimi, and Istogu were each demoted from the top flight.

== Teams ==
Locations of the 2014–15 Football Superleague of Kosovo teams

Club	Town	Stadium
KF Besa Pejë	Peć	Shahin Haxhiislami Stadium
KF Drenica	Skenderaj	Bajram Aliu Stadium
FC Drita	Gjilan	City Stadium (Gnjilane)
KF Ferizaj	Ferizaj	Ismet Shabani Stadium
KF Feronikeli	Glogovac	Rexhep Rexhepi Stadium
KF Vëllaznimi	Gjakova	City Stadium
KF Hajvalia	Pristina	Hajvalia Stadium
KF Istogu	Istok	Demush Mavraj Stadium
KF Kosova Vushtrri	Vushtrri	City Stadium (Vushtrri)
FC Prishtina	Pristina	Fadil Vokrri Stadium
KF Trepça	Mitrovica	Adem Jashari Olympic Stadium
KF Trepça'89	Mitrovica	Riza Lushta Stadium

== League table ==
Pos	Team	Pld	W	D	L	GF	GA	GD	Pts	Relegation
1	Feronikeli (C)	33	19	10	4	51	25	+26	67	
2	Besa	33	20	6	7	51	37	+14	66	
3	Prishtina	33	15	11	7	43	28	+15	56	
4	Hajvalia	33	15	9	9	46	32	+14	54	
5	Kosova Vushtrri	33	13	11	9	36	27	+9	50	
6	Trepça'89	33	12	12	9	52	36	+16	48	
7	Drenica	33	12	8	13	39	35	+4	44	
8	Istogu	33	12	7	14	41	45	−4	43	
9	Drita (O)	33	10	9	14	30	38	−8	39	Qualification for the relegation play-offs
10	Vëllaznimi (R)	33	8	10	15	24	38	−14	34	Qualification for the relegation play-offs
11	Ferizaj (R)	33	5	6	22	22	55	−33	21	Relegation to 2015–16 Liga e Parë
12	Trepça (R)	33	4	7	22	18	57	−39	19	Relegation to 2015–16 Liga e Parë

Source: Football Federation of Kosovo (in Albanian)
Rules for classification: 1) Points; 2) Goal difference; 3) Goal scored; 4) Head-to-Head points; 5) Head-to-Head goal difference; 6) Head-to-Head away goal scored; 7) Head-to-Head goal scored; 8) Play-offs (only if needed to decide champion or teams for relegation).
(C) Champions; (O) Play-off winners; (R) Relegated

== Results ==
=== Matches 1–22 ===
Home \ Away	BES	DRE	DRI	FRZ	FER	HAJ	IST	VUS	PRI	TRE	T89	VLZ
Besa		2–1	1–0	1–0	1–1	1–1	2–1	2–0	1–2	1–0	3–3	2–0
Drenica	3–0		5–0	1–0	0–0	1–0	2–3	1–1	2–0	2–0	0–0	2–0
Drita	1–1	4–0		3–0	1–3	1–2	0–0	1–0	1–1	0–0	3–2	0–0
Ferizaj	0–1	3–1	0–0		2–2	0–3	2–1	0–1	0–1	3–1	0–0	2–0
Feronikeli	2–1	0–2	1–0	4–0		2–5	3–1	0–0	1–1	0–0	2–1	3–0
Hajvalia	1–3	1–0	2–1	1–1	0–1		2–3	1–1	2–3	2–1	4–2	1–0
Istogu	1–2	1–0	1–1	1–0	0–1	2–1		1–2	0–0	2–2	1–0	2–2
Kosova Vushtrri	2–0	0–0	0–1	4–2	0–2	1–1	5–0		1–0	1–0	0–0	2–0
Prishtina	2–1	3–0	2–0	1–1	0–1	0–2	2–1	0–0		3–0	0–0	1–1
Trepça	0–1	1–0	2–1	1–0	0–1	0–0	1–2	1–1	0–3		1–1	1–2
Trepça'89	1–1	1–1	3–0	1–0	1–1	3–0	4–3	2–0	2–2	3–1		2–0
Vëllaznimi	5–0	2–1	1–0	2–0	0–0	0–1	2–1	0–0	0–2	1–0	0–1	

Legend: Blue = home team win; Yellow = draw; Red = away team win.

=== Matches 23–33 ===
Home \ Away	BES	DRE	DRI	FRZ	FER	HAJ	IST	VUS	PRI	TRE	T89	VLZ
Besa		3–2		3–0	1–0	2–1	1–0	2–3				
Drenica			0–0	2–0			0–0			4–1		1–0
Drita	0–1				1–0		2–1			2–0	2–1	
Ferizaj			1–2			0–0		2–1	1–3			1–2
Feronikeli		4–2		3–0		1–0	2–1	3–1	2–2			
Hajvalia		0–0	2–1						2–0	4–0	1–0	2–0
Istogu				2–1		0–0		2–0	0–1			1–0
Kosova Vushtrri		2–0	3–0			1–1			0–1	2–1		0–0
Prishtina	2–4	0–2	1–0							4–0	0–0	0–0
Trepça	0–2			2–0	0–2		0–3				0–3	
Trepça'89	1–1	3–1		4–0	1–3		2–3	0–1				
Vëllaznimi	1–3		1–1		0–0					1–1	1–4	

Legend: Blue = home team win; Yellow = draw; Red = away team win.

=== Relegation play-offs ===
The Relegation play-offs took place on Thursday 11 June 2015. In the draw, Drita drew Flamurtari, while Vëllaznimi drew Gjilani.

11 June 2015

Drita (O)	1–1 (a.e.t.)	Flamurtari
Limani 100'	(report)	A. Bojniku 95'
Penalties
A. Kastrati (penalty missed); Limani (penalty scored); P. Osmani (penalty missed); A. Shillova (penalty scored); I. Ramushi (penalty scored)	3–1	E. Rama (penalty scored); D. Qorri (penalty missed); G. Cana (penalty missed); L. Troshupa (penalty missed)

11 June 2015

Vëllaznimi	0–0 (a.e.t.)	Gjilani (O)
	(report)
Penalties
	3–4
