= Arbër Hoxha =

Albanian footballer (born 1998)

Personal information
- Date of birth: 6 October 1998 (age 28)
- Place of birth: Heidelberg, Germany
- Height: 1.85 m (6 ft 1 in)
- Position: Left winger

Team information
- Current team: Dinamo Zagreb
- Number: 11

Youth career
- –2016: Istogu
- 2016–2017: Prishtina

Senior career*
Years	Team	Apps	(Gls)
2015–2016	Istogu	8	(2)
2016–2019	Prishtina	29	(2)
2016–2017	→ Hajvalia (loan)	1	(0)
2017–2018	→ Besa Pejë (loan)	19	(3)
2019–2021	Ballkani	41	(14)
2021–2022	Lokomotiva Zagreb	8	(0)
2022–2024	Slaven Belupo	61	(11)
2024–	Dinamo Zagreb	88	(11)

International career^{‡}
2019	Kosovo U21	1	(0)
2020–2021	Kosovo	3	(1)
2024–	Albania	31	(2)
- * Club domestic league appearances and goals as of 22 November 2026 ‡ National team caps and goals as of 15 November 2026

Arbër Hoxha (Albanian pronunciation: [ˈaɾbər ˈhɔd͡ʒa]; born 6 October 1998) is a Albanian professional footballer who plays as a left winger for Croatian club Dinamo Zagreb and the Albania national team.

He began his senior career in Kosovo, playing for Istogu, Prishtina, Hajvalia, Besa Pejë and Ballkani. In 2021 he moved abroad to Croatia, joining Lokomotiva Zagreb, before later playing for Slaven Belupo and subsequently Dinamo Zagreb, where he won two domestic doubles of the Croatian League and the Croatian Cup in the 2023–24 and 2025–26 seasons, as well as the corresponding Croatian Super Cup titles awarded to the club following both league and cup triumphs.

Hoxha represented the Kosovo national team in few friendly matches. In 2024, he switched his international allegiance to the Albania national team, whom he went on to represent at UEFA Euro 2024.

== Club career ==
=== Early career in Kosovo ===
Hoxha began his youth football with Istogu, before moving to the youth setup of Prishtina. In the 2016–17 season he was loaned to Hajvalia, where he made his senior debut, a single first-team appearance. The following season he was sent on loan to Besa Pejë, scoring three goals in 19 league matches in the Kosovo Superleague. After returning to Prishtina, Hoxha made around 29 league appearances across two campaigns, adding two goals for the club.

In August 2019 he transferred to Ballkani, where he enjoyed a breakthrough, scoring 14 goals in 41 league appearances during two seasons, establishing himself as one of the most promising wingers in the domestic league. With Ballkani, he established himself as one of the most promising wingers in the league, contributing with goals and assists over two seasons.

=== Lokomotiva Zagreb ===
On 5 July 2021, Hoxha joined Croatian First League side Lokomotiva. He was presented as a young talent making the step into the Croatian top division. He made his debut on 14 August 2021 in a 4–0 home win over Istra 1961, coming on as a substitute in the 70th minute for Lukas Kačavenda. During his stint at Lokomotiva, Hoxha made 8 league appearances, 11 matches in all competitions, without finding the net. His total minutes played for the club were modest, reflecting his role as a rotational option.

Although Hoxha did not score during his time at Lokomotiva, the period provided him with exposure to the Croatian top flight and helped him adapt to a higher level of competition, laying groundwork for his later transfer to Slaven Belupo.

=== Slaven Belupo ===
On 8 February 2022, Hoxha signed a three-year contract with Croatian First League club Slaven Belupo. Ten days later, he made his debut in a 3–0 away win against Gorica after coming on as a substitute in the 80th minute in place of Hansel Zapata. Within two months, he established himself as a starter in the team, eventually registering 10 league appearances by the end of the season in which he contributed with two assists.

In the 2022–23 Prva HNL season, Hoxha quickly established himself as a starter, recording 33 league appearances (32 as a starter), while also being one of the most used players of the campaign. On 14 October 2022, in a league match against Šibenik, Hoxha scored twice – once with a header in the 71st minute and once with a long-range shot from about 20 meters – to lead Slaven Belupo to a 2–0 victory. Hoxha ended the campaign with a goal in Slaven Belupo's final match (1-1) vs Istra, scoring with a header in the 56th minute. This was his 7th league goal of the season.

During the first half of the 2023–24 season, before his departure, he featured in 18 league matches, scoring 5 goals and adding 1 assist, maintaining his reputation as one of the team's key offensive outlets. On 20 September 2023, in the Croatian Cup Round of 16, Hoxha scored in the 35th minute in Slaven Belupo's 4–2 away win over Moslavina. On 6 October 2023, in the game against Varazdin, Hoxha scored in the 16th minute to give Slaven Belupo the lead in an eventual 3–2 victory. On 24 November 2023, in the match against his ex-team Lokomotiva Zagreb, Hoxha opened the scoring in the 14th minute, contributing decisively to a much-needed win 3–1 after a spell without victories. On 10 December 2023, he scored against Hajduk Split a late goal in the 85th minute with a chip/parabola to complete a 4–2 win for Slaven Belupo.

Overall, in all competitions, Hoxha made 63 appearances, scored 11 goals and provided 7 assists for Slaven Belupo. His performances attracted interest from larger Croatian clubs, and by the end of the winter transfer window in January 2024 he departed Slaven Belupo to join Dinamo Zagreb, marking a major step in his career.

=== Dinamo Zagreb ===
In January 2024, Hoxha joined Dinamo Zagreb for a reported fee of around €2 million. He made his debut shortly after signing, appearing in the league match against city rivals and his former club Lokomotiva Zagreb.

==== Impact in a double domestic titles ====
On 22 February 2024, Hoxha provided a decisive assist in the UEFA Europa Conference League round of 16 first leg against Real Betis (1–1 draw at home), helping Dinamo advance after winning the away leg 1–0. He scored his first goal for Dinamo in the Conference League second leg against PAOK, netting early in the second half, although Dinamo were eliminated on aggregate. On 5 May 2024, Hoxha came on as a substitute in the 87th minute and scored the decisive goal in a 1–0 away victory over Rijeka, Dinamo's main rival for the title, a result regarded as pivotal in the championship race. Dinamo won the 2023–24 Croatian First League, finishing four points ahead of Rijeka, with Hoxha contributing 15 appearances during the second half of the season. On 22 May 2024, he assisted twice in the Croatian Cup final second leg against Rijeka, helping Dinamo secure a 3–1 away victory and complete the domestic double.

==== 2024–25 season ====
In the 2024–25 Prva HNL season, Hoxha had several impactful moments. In the opening match on 2 August, he scored with a header within 13 minutes against Istra 1961. He also found the net in the following round away to Osijek, scoring the equalizer in the 21st minute of a match Dinamo eventually won 2–1. With two goals in the opening two league fixtures, he was considered one of the key performers in Dinamo's strong start to the season. On 7 February 2025, he came off the bench against Šibenik and, within four minutes, scored once and provided an assist, securing the victory for Dinamo and his display was described as one of his most decisive performances of the campaign.

Across the league campaign, Hoxha made 31 appearances, scoring 3 goals and providing 3 assists, as Dinamo finished second in the table, level on 65 points with champions Rijeka but placed behind due to the head-to-head record. In addition, Hoxha played three matches in the Croatian Cup and seven in the UEFA Champions League, but Dinamo did not secure any trophies that season.

==== 2025–26 season ====
After establishing himself as a starter in mid-September 2025, Hoxha scored in the eternal derby against Hajduk Split on 20 September, helping his side to secure a 2–0 away win. He continued his form in European competition, providing an assist in the UEFA Europa League fixture against Fenerbahçe in a spectacular 3–1 win by Dinamo, where he was described as one of standout players. On 28 September, he faced his former team Slaven Belupo, scoring once and providing an assist in the first half as Dinamo led 2–0 at half-time. He was substituted at the break due to a minor thigh issue, with Dinamo eventually winning the match 4–1. His performances in this run saw him included in the “team of the week” in Croatia, with media outlets rating him highly. On 6 December 2025, he scored a stoppage-time equaliser in the 90+12' minute in another derby against Hajduk Split, with the match finishing in a 1–1 draw. On 19 April 2026, he won a late penalty to help Dinamo Zagreb avoid defeat against Rijeka, in what was his 100th appearance for the club. On 27 April 2026, Hoxha won the Croatian league title, securing the championship with four matches remaining after a 2–1 victory over Varaždin. On 2 May 2026, he scored against Gorica from outside the penalty area in the 5th minute, marking his seventh league goal of the season. On 13 May 2026, Hoxha also won the Croatian Cup after Dinamo Zagreb defeated Rijeka 2–0 in the final, completing a domestic double for the club.

== International career ==
Although born in Germany and holding both Kosovan and Albanian nationality, Hoxha has represented both Kosovo and later Albania at international level.

=== Kosovo ===
On 14 March 2018, Hoxha received his first call-up for the Kosovo U21 squad for the 2019 UEFA European Under-21 Championship qualification matches against Azerbaijan and Germany. He made his U21 debut on 15 October 2019 in a 2021 UEFA European Under-21 Championship qualification match against Albania, coming on as a substitute in the 78th minute for Ismet Lushaku and providing an assist in Kosovo's only goal in a 2–1 away defeat.

Hoxha received his first senior call-up on 24 December 2019 for a friendly match against Sweden. He made his senior debut the following month, coming on as a substitute in the 46th minute for Zymer Bytyqi. On 11 June 2021, Hoxha scored his first senior international goal in his third appearance, securing a 1–0 home win over Gambia.

=== Albania ===
In August 2023, Hoxha was granted an Albanian passport, and in January 2024 he confirmed his switch of international allegiance to Albania, explaining that although he had played three matches for Kosovo, he had not been called up recently and now intended to represent Albania.

On 15 March 2024, Hoxha received his first call-up to Albania for friendly matches against Chile and Sweden. He made his debut on 22 March 2024 in a match against Chile. On 8 June 2024, coach Sylvinho included Hoxha in the final squad of 26 players for Euro 2024. During the tournament, Hoxha appeared as a substitute in all three of Albania's group stage matches, coming on in the second half against Italy, Spain, and Croatia. Albania finished bottom of Group B with one point.

During the 2026 FIFA World Cup qualification (UEFA) campaign, Hoxha featured in all eight matches in Group K, playing both as a starter and as a substitute, including three full matches, as the team achieved four wins without conceding, two draws, and two defeats against England. Albania secured qualification to the play-off for the first time in its history. In the play-off on 26 March 2026 against Poland, Hoxha started and scored Albania's only goal before half-time, as Albania lost 2–1 after initially taking the lead and was eliminated.

== Career statistics ==
=== Club ===
As of match played 22 November 2026

Appearances and goals by club, season and competition
Club	Season	League			National cup (Note: Includes Kosovar Cup, Croatian Cup)		Continental		Total	
Club	Season	Division	Apps	Goals	Apps	Goals	Apps	Goals	Apps	Goals
Istogu	2015–16	Kosovo Superleague	8	2	1	0	—		9	2
Prishtina	2016–17	Kosovo Superleague	3	0	0	0	—		3	0
Prishtina	2017–18	Kosovo Superleague	13	1	1	0	—		14	1
Prishtina	2018–19	Kosovo Superleague	14	1	1	0	2 (Note: Appearances in UEFA Europa League)	0	17	1
Prishtina	Total		38	4	3	0	2	0	43	4
Hajvalia (loan)	2016–17	Kosovo Superleague	1	0	0	0	—		1	0
Besa Pejë (loan)	2017–18	Kosovo Superleague	19	3	0	0	—		19	3
Ballkani	2019–20	Kosovo Superleague	24	6	5	1	—		29	7
Ballkani	2020–21	Kosovo Superleague	17	8	1	0	—		18	8
Ballkani	Total		41	14	6	1	—		47	15
Lokomotiva Zagreb	2021–22	Croatian First League	8	0	3	0	—		11	0
Slaven Belupo	2021–22	Croatian First League	10	0	0	0	—		10	0
Slaven Belupo	2022–23	Croatian First League	33	7	2	0	—		35	7
Slaven Belupo	2023–24	Croatian First League	18	5	2	1	—		20	6
Slaven Belupo	Total		61	12	4	1	—		65	13
Dinamo Zagreb	2023–24	Croatian First League	15	1	3	0	4 (Note: Appearances in UEFA Conference League)	1	22	1
Dinamo Zagreb	2024–25	Croatian First League	31	3	3	0	7 (Note: Appearances in UEFA Champions League)	0	41	3
Dinamo Zagreb	2025–26	Croatian First League	31	6	2	0	9	0	42	6
Dinamo Zagreb	2026–27	Croatian First League	11	1	0	0	9 (Note: Five appearances and one goal in UEFA Champions League, four appearances in UEFA Europa League)	1	20	2
Dinamo Zagreb	Total		88	11	8	0	29	2	125	13
Career total			256	44	24	2	31	2	311	48

=== International ===
As of 15 November 2026

Appearances and goals by national team and year
National team	Year	Apps	Goals
Kosovo	2020	1	0
Kosovo	2021	2	1
Total		3	1
Albania	2024	11	0
Albania	2025	10	1
Albania	2026	10	1
Total		31	2

List of international goals scored by Arbër Hoxha^{Scores and results list Kosovo's and Albania's goal tally first, score column indicates score after each Hoxha goal.}
No.	Date	Venue	Opponent	Score	Result	Competition	Ref.
Kosovo goals
1.	11 June 2021	Arslan Zeki Demirci Sports Complex, Manavgat, Turkey	Gambia	1–0	1–0	Friendly	
Albania goals
1.	14 October 2025	Arena Kombëtare, Tirana, Albania	Jordan	3–1	4–2	Friendly	
2.	26 March 2026	Stadion Narodowy, Warsaw, Poland	Poland	1–0	1–2	2026 FIFA World Cup qualification second round (play-off semi-finals)	

== Honours ==
Dinamo Zagreb

- Croatian League: 2023–24 & 2025–26
- Croatian Cup: 2023–24 & 2025–26
- Croatian Super Cup: 2024 & 2026
