= 2016–17 First Football League of Kosovo =

First Football League of Kosovo
- Season: 2016-17
- Dates: 27 August 2016 – 27 May 2017
- Champions: Vëllaznimi
- Promoted: Vëllaznimi; Flamurtari; Vllaznia Pozheran
- Relegated: Istogu; Deçani
- Matches: 240
- Goals: 599 (2.5 per match)

The 2016–17 First Football League of Kosovo (Albanian: Liga e Parë e Futbollit të Kosovës) is the 71st season of 2nd division football in Kosovo. The season began on 27 August 2016 and ended on 27 May 2017, with the playoffs concluding on 6 June 2017.

== League table ==
Pos	Team	Pld	W	D	L	GF	GA	GD	Pts	Promotion, qualification or relegation
1	Vëllaznimi (C, P)	30	21	5	4	60	27	+33	68	Promotion to Football Superleague of Kosovo
2	Flamurtari (P)	30	21	5	4	44	12	+32	68	Promotion to Football Superleague of Kosovo
3	Vllaznia Pozheran (O, P)	30	15	7	8	43	25	+18	52	Qualification for the promotion Play-offs
4	Dukagjini	30	15	7	8	50	28	+22	52	Qualification for the promotion Play-offs
5	2 Korriku	30	12	11	7	48	33	+15	47	
6	Vushtrria	30	13	6	11	42	32	+10	45	
7	Fushë Kosova	30	12	6	12	34	28	+6	42	
8	Vitia	30	10	11	9	38	38	0	41	
9	KEK	30	11	7	12	35	38	−3	40	
10	Ballkani	30	9	8	13	32	45	−13	35	
11	Ramiz Sadiku	30	10	5	15	34	51	−17	35	
12	Kosova Prishtinë	30	10	4	16	44	58	−14	34	
13	Ulpiana (R)	30	8	8	14	34	52	−18	32	Qualification for the relegation play-offs
14	Rahoveci (O)	30	8	6	16	22	39	−17	30	Qualification for the relegation play-offs
15	Istogu (R)	30	6	7	17	37	52	−15	25	Relegation to Second Football League of Kosovo
16	Deçani (R)	30	4	7	19	26	65	−39	19	Relegation to Second Football League of Kosovo

Source: Football Federation of Kosovo (in Albanian), RSSSF
Rules for classification: 1) Points; 2) Goal difference; 3) Goals scored; 4) Head-to-head points; 5) Head-to-head goal difference; 6) Head-to-head away goals scored; 7) Head-to-head goals scored; 8) Play-offs (only if needed to decide champion or teams for relegation).
(C) Champions; (O) Play-off winners; (P) Promoted; (R) Relegated

== Results ==
Each team plays twice against every opponent (once at home and once away) for a total of 30 games played each

== Relegation play-offs ==
5 June 2017

Ulpiana	0-0 (a.e.t.)	Kika
Penalties
	9-10

KF Ulpiana were relegated to the 2nd League, while KF Kika got promoted to the First League

6 June 2017

Rahoveci	2-0	Lugu i Baranit

Rahoveci & KF Lugu i Baranit remained in their respective leagues
