= Otto John (footballer) =

Nigerian footballer (born 1998)

Personal information
- Full name: John Otto John
- Date of birth: 25 January 1998 (age 28)
- Place of birth: Akwa Ibom, Nigeria
- Height: 1.80 m (5 ft 11 in)
- Position: Forward

Team information
- Current team: Asswehly
- Number: 8

Youth career
- –2015: 36 Lion FC

Senior career*
Years	Team	Apps	(Gls)
2015–2020	Skënderbeu Korçë	43	(5)
2015–2018	→ Trepça '89 (loan)	67	(43)
2020–2022	Prishtina	19	(13)
2022–2023	Dukagjini	30	(9)
2023–2025	Turan Tovuz	57	(14)
2025	Al-Madina	17	(12)
2025–	Asswehly	11	(4)
- * Club domestic league appearances and goals as of 02nd August 2026

John Otto John (born 25 January 1998), commonly known as Otto John, is a Nigerian professional footballer who plays as a forward for Lybian club Asswehly SC.

== Club career ==
=== Skënderbeu Korçë ===
In December 2015, John joined Albanian Superliga side Skënderbeu Korçë.

==== Loan at Trepça'89 ====
===== 2015–16 season =====
In the 2015–16 season, John joined Kosovo Superleague side Trepça '89, on a season-long loan and during that season, he played only 3 matches.

===== 2016–17 season =====
John enjoyed a great form during the 2016–17 season, netting 26 goals in 33 matches. His performances throughout the year earned him league's top goalscorer award and a spot in 2016 Football Superleague of Kosovo's Team of the Year.

===== 2017–18 season =====
John's first match for the 2017–18 season was a match in the framework of first qualifying round of 2017–18 UEFA Champions League and in that match he played after being named in the starting line-up.

After Trepça '89 were eliminated from the UEFA Champions League, John continued to be part of the team, and during the 2017–18 season he scored 17 goals in 31 matches and was named the league's top goalscorer for the second time, together with Mirlind Daku of Llapi. On 27 June 2018, John left the club after his loan ended having scored 43 goals in 69 appearances in all competitions.

==== Return to Skënderbeu Korçë ====
On 9 July 2018, John returned to his parent club Skënderbeu Korçë, ahead of the 2018–19 season. On 12 August 2018, he won his first trophy as a Skënderbeu Korçë player, the 2018 Albanian Supercup as the team defeated Laçi 3–2 at the Elbasan Arena. John was an unused substitute in the match.

On 17 August 2018, John made his debut in a 1–0 home win in the opening week of the 2018–19 Albanian Superliga against Partizani Tirana after coming on as a late substitute in place of Blerim Krasniqi. In the second matchday versus newly-promoted side Kastrioti, he come on as a late substitute and assisted the third goal in a 3–0 victory.

On 12 September 2018, John scored his first goal for Skënderbeu Korçë in a 3–0 win against Veleçiku Koplik in the first round of Albanian Cup. His first Albanian Superliga goal came five days later in the 2–0 win at Flamurtari Vlorë, netting the second of the match eight minutes after coming on as a substitute.

=== Prishtina ===
On 8 January 2020, John joined Kosovo Superleague side Prishtina. One month later, he made his debut with Prishtina in the quarter-final of 2019–20 Kosovar Cup against Vushtrria after being named in the starting line-up and scored two goals during a 4–1 home win.

=== Turan Tovuz ===
On 7 July 2024, Azerbaijan Premier League club Turan Tovuz announced the signing of John from Dukagjini. On 2 February 2025, Turan Tovuz announced that John had left the club to sign for Al-Madina.

== International career ==
"Yes, I would accept to play for Kosovo. If they think I can help I'm ready. It would be a new challenge for me. Since I've been in Kosovo for more than a year I'm here and I am adopted."

— Otto John in an interview for a sport show in March 2017.

Because of his talent, there were numerous discussions about making John the first foreign player for the Kosovo national team. John said that would gladly accept an invitation from the coach Albert Bunjaki, although he would have to obtain a Kosovan passport in advance.

== Personal life ==
John was born in Akwa Ibom, a one of Nigeria's 36 states to Nigerian parents. He stated that he grew up idolizing Didier Drogba due to his strength and Samuel Eto'o due to his goalscoring abilities.

The May 5, 2022, John was arrested for human trafficking.

== Career statistics ==
=== Club ===
As of 8 February 2020

Club	Season	League			Cup		Continental		Other		Total	
Club	Season	Division	Apps	Goals	Apps	Goals	Apps	Goals	Apps	Goals	Apps	Goals
Skënderbeu Korçë	2018–19	Albanian Superliga	28	4	5	2	—				33	6
Skënderbeu Korçë	2019–20	Albanian Superliga	15	1	0	0	—				15	1
Skënderbeu Korçë	Total		43	5	5	2	—				48	7
Trepça '89 (loan)	2015–16	Kosovo Superleague	3	0	0	0	—				3	0
Trepça '89 (loan)	2016–17	Kosovo Superleague	33	26	0	0	—				33	26
Trepça '89 (loan)	2017–18	Kosovo Superleague	31	17	0	0	2 (Note: All appearance(s) in UEFA Champions League)	0	—		33	17
Trepça '89 (loan)	Total		67	43	0	0	2	0	—		69	43
Prishtina	2019–20	Football Superleague of Kosovo	7	7	3	2	—		—		10	9
Prishtina	Total		7	7	3	2	—		—		10	9
Career total			117	55	8	4	2	0	0	0	127	59

== Honours ==
=== Club ===
Skënderbeu Korçë

- Albanian Supercup: 2018

Trepça'89

- Kosovo Superleague: 2016–17
- Kosovar Supercup: 2017

=== Individual ===
- Kosovo Superleague top goalscorer: 2016–17, 2017–18 (shared)
- Kosovo Superleague's Team of the Year: 2016
