= Mentor Zhdrella =

Kosovan footballer (born 1988)

Personal information
- Date of birth: 10 June 1988 (age 38)
- Place of birth: Pristina, Kosovo, Yugoslavia
- Height: 1.84 m (6 ft 0 in)
- Position: Midfielder

Team information
- Current team: Llapi (sporting director)

Senior career*
| Years | Team | Apps | (Gls) |
| 2005–2006 | KEK | | |
| 2006–2008 | 2 Korriku | | |
| 2008–2009 | Prishtina | | |
| 2008–2013 | Hysi | | |
| 2014 | Drita | | |
| 2014 | Partizani | 0 | (0) |
| 2014–2015 | Prishtina | 33 | (5) |
| 2015–2017 | Feronikeli | 44 | (11) |
| 2017–2021 | Llapi | 97 | (20) |
| 2022 | Dukagjini | 9 | (3) |

International career
| 2014 | Kosovo | 2 | (0) |

Managerial career
- 2023–: Llapi (sporting director)
- * Club domestic league appearances and goals

Mentor Zhdrella (born 10 June 1988) is a Kosovan professional football official and a former midfielder. He is the sporting director for Llapi. He has been hailed as one of Kosovo's greatest talent, having been named four times as Footballer of the Year of Kosovo, in 2009, 2010, 2011 and 2012. Mentor Zhdrella is known for his pace, dribbling and his speciality is free kicks.

== Club career ==
=== Drita ===
On 28 March 2014, Zhdrella joined fellow top flight side Drita for the remaining part of 2013–14 season.

=== Partizani Tirana ===
In June 2014, Zhdrella signed with Albanian Superliga side Partizani Tirana and was handed squad number 7. He left the club after only one month after being unable to live away from his family.

=== Prishtina ===
On 22 July 2014, Zhdrella completed a transfer to Prishtina by penning a one-year contract. He was presented on the same day and was assigned squad number 7, stating: Prishtina is the biggest club of country, it's normal to be part of it." He made his debut on 16 August in the opening matchday of 2014–15 Football Superleague of Kosovo against Istogu where his cross in the ninth minute turned into an own goal by Istogu's Elvis Gacaferri in an eventual 2–1 away win.

His first score-sheet contributions came in his sixth appearance for the club on 20 September, netting in the 1–1 home draw against Vëllaznimi, ending a run of defeats. He had to wait until 1 April of the following year to score his second goals, netting the second in the 3–0 home win over Drenica. He finished the season with 5 goals in 33 league appearances, being ever-presented as Prishtina finished 3rd in the championship. Following the end of the contract, Zhderlla left as a free agent.

=== Feronikeli ===
On 3 August 2015, Zhdrella joined Feronikeli on a one-year deal. In his first season, he played 22 matches and scored 6 goals as the team won the championship in the 2015–16 season. In the 2016–17 season, he played 20 matches and scored 5 goals but Feronikeli didn't retain the title. In January 2017, Zhdrella was named in the Best XI of Football Superleague of Kosovo for 2016. He left the club on 12 July 2017. His departure was confirmed by Feronikeli's chairman, Arton Berisha.

=== Llapi ===
On 14 July 2017, Zhdrella signed a contract with Llapi as a free agent. He took the squad number 7, and made his debut on 19 August in the opening match of championship against Drenica which finished in a 1–0 home win. He opened his scoring account on 29 October in the matchday 13 against bottom side Vllaznia Pozheran, netting twice inside eight minutes, including one with free kick, to overturn the score from 0–1 to 2–1 in an eventual 4–1 home win.

== International career ==
On 19 May 2014. Zhdrella received a call-up from Kosovo for the friendly matches against Turkey and Senegal. On 21 May 2014, he made his debut with Kosovo in friendly match against Turkey after coming on as a substitute at 72nd minute in place of Dardan Rexhepi.

== Personal life ==
Zhdrella is a Muslim. On 20 July 2015, he became a father for the first time when his wife gave birth to the couple's first son, named Kaon.

== Honours ==
Feronikeli

- Football Superleague of Kosovo: 2015–16

Individual

- Best Footballer of the Year of Kosovo: 2009, 2010, 2011 and 2012
- Football Superleague of Kosovo Best XI: 2016
