= 2016–17 Football Superleague of Kosovo =

Football Superleague of Kosovo
- Season: 2016–17
- Champions: Trepça'89 (1st title)
- Relegated: Ferizaj; Trepça; Hajvalia
- Champions League: Trepça'89
- Europa League: Prishtina
- Matches: 198
- Goals: 473 (2.39 per match)
- Top goalscorer: Otto John (27 goals)
- Biggest home win: Liria 9–1 Hajvalia (28 May 2017)
- Biggest away win: Hajvalia 1–6 Besa (5 April 2017)
- Highest scoring: Liria 9–1 Hajvalia (28 May 2017)

The 2016–17 Football Superleague of Kosovo season, also known as the Vala Superleague of Kosovo for sponsorship reasons, was the 18th (Note: This season was the 18th season under the name Football Superleague of Kosovo, the 24th season of top-tier football in Kosovo and the 70th season of football in Kosovo overall.) season of top-tier football in Kosovo. The season began on 19 August 2016 and concluded on 28 May 2017; the relegation play-offs will follow. Feronikeli are the defending champions.

A total of 12 teams are competing in the league: 10 sides from the 2015–16 season and two promoted from the Liga e Parë.

The 2016–17 season will be the first full season that the Football Federation of Kosovo will be a member of FIFA and UEFA. Qualification for the UEFA Champions League will be determined at the end of the season, pending re-evaluation of the league's adherence to UEFA Financial Fair Play Regulations and stadium standards.

On 9 May 2017, Trepça'89 defeated Besa 2–0 away from home to clinch their first league title. Trepça'89 participated in the first qualifying round of the 2017–18 UEFA Champions League, the first team from Kosovo to participate in the competition.

== Teams and stadiums ==
Locations of the 2016–17 Football Superleague of Kosovo teams

Istogu and Vushtrria were relegated after finishing the previous season in eleventh and twelfth-place respectively. They were replaced by the champions and runners-up of the 2015–16 Liga e Parë, Trepça and Ferizaj respectively.

Note: Table lists in alphabetical order.

Club	Town	Stadium	Capacity
Besa	Peć	Shahin Haxhiislami	8,500
Drenica	Skenderaj	Bajram Aliu	3,000
Drita	Gjilan	Gjilan City Stadium (Note: The two teams, Drita and Gjilan, which use this stadium together with their fans, have named the stadium with different names. Drita and their fans call the stadium as Selami Osmani-Bezi Stadium, while Gjilan and their fans call the stadium as Agim Ramadani Stadium, but officially the stadium is called Gjilan City Stadium.)	15,000
Ferizaj	Ferizaj	Ismet Shabani	2,000
Feronikeli	Glogovac	Rexhep Rexhepi	2,000
Gjilani	Gjilan	Gjilan City Stadium	15,000
Hajvalia	Hajvalia	Hajvalia Stadium	2,000
Liria	Prizren	Përparim Thaçi	15,000
Llapi	Podujevë	Zahir Pajaziti	8,000
Prishtina	Pristina	Agron Rama	16,200
Trepça	Mitrovica	Olympic Stadium Adem Jashari	18,000
Trepça'89	Mitrovica	Riza Lushta	12,000

Source: Scoresway

== League table ==
Pos	Team	Pld	W	D	L	GF	GA	GD	Pts	Qualification or relegation
1	Trepça'89 (C)	33	24	5	4	72	24	+48	77	Qualification for the Champions League first qualifying round
2	Prishtina	33	22	6	5	46	18	+28	72	Qualification for the Europa League first qualifying round
3	Llapi	33	21	5	7	44	30	+14	68	
4	Feronikeli	33	20	5	8	61	27	+34	65	
5	Gjilani	33	13	9	11	36	28	+8	48	
6	Besa (Note: Besa would have qualified for the Europa League first qualifying round as the winners of the 2016–17 Kosovar Cup, but failed to obtain a UEFA licence. As a result, the berth was given to the league runners-up, Prishtina.)	33	13	8	12	42	39	+3	47	
7	Drenica	33	10	10	13	37	47	−10	40	
8	Liria	33	10	7	16	41	39	+2	37	
9	Drita (O)	33	9	8	16	21	34	−13	35	Qualification for the relegation play-offs
10	Ferizaj (R)	33	6	13	14	24	36	−12	31	Qualification for the relegation play-offs
11	Trepça (R)	33	5	8	20	37	64	−27	23	Relegation to Liga e Parë
12	Hajvalia (R)	33	1	4	28	12	87	−75	7	Relegation to Liga e Parë

Source: Football Federation of Kosovo (in Albanian), Soccerway
Rules for classification: 1) Points; 2) Goal difference; 3) Goals scored; 4) Head-to-head points; 5) Head-to-head goal difference; 6) Head-to-head away goals scored; 7) Head-to-head goals scored; 8) Play-offs (only if needed to decide champion or teams for relegation).
(C) Champions; (O) Play-off winners; (R) Relegated

== Results ==
Each team plays three times against every other team, either twice at home and once away or once at home and twice away, for a total of 33 matches played each.

=== Matches 1–22 ===
Home \ Away	BES	DRE	DRI	FRZ	FRN	GJI	HAJ	LIR	LLA	PRI	TRE	T89
Besa	—	2–1	2–0	2–0	1–1	0–0	4–0	2–0	1–0	1–1	1–2	2–3
Drenica	1–1	—	1–1	1–1	1–2	1–1	1–0	2–1	2–0	0–0	1–0	2–3
Drita	1–1	2–1	—	0–0	0–1	0–1	0–1	1–0	0–1	0–1	2–2	0–0
Ferizaj	0–1	2–3	1–0	—	2–0	1–2	4–0	0–0	0–0	0–0	2–2	0–1
Feronikeli	1–2	1–0	1–0	2–1	—	1–0	6–1	1–0	1–0	0–1	5–1	4–1
Gjilani	0–1	2–0	1–1	0–1	2–1	—	1–0	0–0	0–1	1–0	0–0	1–2
Hajvalia	0–0	0–1	0–1	0–0	2–3	1–2	—	2–4	0–2	0–0	1–1	0–4
Liria	0–1	1–1	3–1	3–0	1–3	1–0	3–0	—	0–0	1–2	1–0	0–3
Llapi	3–2	1–0	1–0	0–0	0–3 (Note: Match awarded 3–0 to Feronikeli due to crowd violence.)	1–0	3–1	2–0	—	0–0	2–1	2–0
Prishtina	2–0	6–0	0–1	1–0	0–0	1–0	3–0	1–0	3–1	—	2–1	0–2
Trepça	1–1	0–0	0–1	1–1	0–1	0–2	3–0	1–4	0–1	1–2	—	1–3
Trepça'89	2–1	4–0	1–0	4–1	0–0	1–1	1–0	2–0	3–0	1–0	6–1	—

Source: Football Federation of Kosovo (in Albanian)
Legend: Blue = home team win; Yellow = draw; Red = away team win.

=== Matches 23–33 ===
Home \ Away	BES	DRE	DRI	FRZ	FRN	GJI	HAJ	LIR	LLA	PRI	TRE	T89
Besa	—	—	—	1–0	—	1–1	—	1–0	—	1–2	1–3	0–2
Drenica	3–1	—	2–0	—	—	—	4–0	—	—	1–3	—	0–0
Drita	2–0	—	—	2–1	—	—	2–0	—	—	1–3	—	0–2
Ferizaj	—	1–1	—	—	0–4	0–0	—	—	1–2	—	2–1	—
Feronikeli	4–1	1–3	0–0	—	—	—	6–0	1–1	—	1–2	—	—
Gjilani	—	4–1	0–1	—	1–0	—	3–0	2–0	1–1	—	—	—
Hajvalia	1–6	—	—	0–1	—	—	—	—	—	0–1	1–3	0–3
Liria	—	0–0	3–0 (Note: Match awarded 3–0 to Liria due to crowd violence caused by the Drita fans; the match was abandoned in the 90th minute, with Liria leading 1–0.)	1–1	—	—	9–1	—	—	—	3–1	—
Llapi	2–0	4–1	2–0	—	2–0	—	2–0	2–0	—	—	—	—
Prishtina	—	—	—	1–0	—	1–0	—	3–1	1–2	—	2–1	1–0
Trepça	—	2–1	1–1	—	1–3	3–5	—	—	1–3	—	—	—
Trepça'89	—	—	—	0–0	0–3	5–2	—	2–0	8–1	—	3–1	—

Source: Football Federation of Kosovo (in Albanian)
Legend: Blue = home team win; Yellow = draw; Red = away team win.

=== Relegation play-offs ===
The ninth and tenth-placed teams, Drita and Ferizaj respectively, each paired off against the third and fourth-placed teams from the 2016–17 First Football League of Kosovo season, Vllaznia and Dukagjini respectively; the two winners will play in the top-flight next season. As with previous seasons, both play-offs were played on neutral ground.

3 June 2017
16:00 CEST

Ferizaj	1–1 (a.e.t.)	Vllaznia
E. Kuka 108'	Report	L. Ferati 97'
Penalties
B. Shabani (penalty scored); Q. Tërshana (penalty scored); M. Bushi (penalty missed); E. Kuka (penalty missed); Sh. Salihu (penalty missed)	2–3	(penalty missed) L. Ferati; (penalty missed) F. Merovci; (penalty scored) E. Bruti; (penalty scored) Sh. Sulimani; (penalty scored) L. Kallaba

Riza Lushta Stadium, Mitrovica
Attendance: 1,000
Referee: Kreshnik Vula

Vllaznia were promoted to 2017–18 Football Superleague of Kosovo; Ferizaj were relegated to 2017–18 First Football League of Kosovo.

4 June 2017
16:00 CEST

Dukagjini	1–2	Drita
E. Zallaj 35'	Report	S. Zeneli 64'; A. Shillova 90+1'

Riza Lushta Stadium, Mitrovica
Attendance: 1,000
Referee: Fatmir Tahiri

Drita retained their spot in 2017–18 Football Superleague of Kosovo; Dukagjini remained in 2017–18 First Football League of Kosovo.

== Season statistics ==
=== Top scorers ===
As of matches played on 28 May 2017.

Rank	Player	Club	Goals
1	(Nigeria) Otto John	KF Trepça'89	27
2	(Kosovo) Florent Hasani	KF Trepça'89	16
3	(Kosovo) Granit Arifaj	KF Drenica	14
4	(Ghana) Basit Abdul Khalid	FC Prishtina	13
5	(Kosovo) Betim Haxhimusa	KF Gjilani	11
5	(Kosovo) Qemail Elshani	KF Besa Pejë	11
6	(Kosovo) Xhevdet Shabani	KF Besa Pejë	10
6	(Kosovo) Fiton Hajdari	KF Trepça'89	10
6	(Democratic Republic of the Congo) Gauthier Mankenda	FC Prishtina	10
7	(Kosovo) Florim Bërbatovci	KF Llapi	9
8	(Kosovo) Hasan Hyseni	KF Trepça'89	8
8	(Kosovo) Labinot Osmani	KF Feronikeli	8
8	(Kosovo) Isa Eminhaziri	KF Gjilani	8
8	(Kosovo) Berat Hyseni	KF Llapi	8
8	(Kosovo) Shkëmbim Salihu	KF Ferizaj	8
8	(Kosovo) Mendurim Hoti	KF Feronikeli	8
9	(Kosovo) Liridon Fetahaj	KF Liria	7
9	(Kosovo) Kreshnik Lushtaku	KF Drenica	7
9	(Kosovo) Mirlind Daku	KF Llapi	7
