= Muharrem Jashari =

Kosovar association football player

Personal information
- Full name: Muharrem Jashari
- Date of birth: 21 February 1998 (age 28)
- Place of birth: Mitrovica, FR Yugoslavia (now Kosovo)
- Height: 1.82 m (6 ft 0 in)
- Position: Midfielder

Team information
- Current team: LNZ Cherkasy
- Number: 10

Youth career
- 2005–2016: Trepça '89

Senior career*
Years	Team	Apps	(Gls)
2016–2021	Trepça '89	102	(11)
2021–2024	Drita	75	(8)
2024–	LNZ Cherkasy	62	(8)

International career^{‡}
2017–2020	Kosovo U21	9	(0)
2021–	Kosovo	15	(1)
- * Club domestic league appearances and goals as of 3 June 2026 ‡ National team caps and goals as of 20:06, 1 October 2026 (UTC)

Muharrem Jashari (born 21 February 1998) is a Kosovan professional footballer who plays as a midfielder for Ukrainian Premier League club LNZ Cherkasy and the Kosovo national team.

== Club career ==
=== Drita ===
On 16 June 2021, Jashari signed a three-year contract with Kosovo Superleague club Drita, and receiving squad number 10. Drita reportedly paid an €80 thousand transfer fee. On 8 July 2021, he made his debut with Drita in the 2021–22 UEFA Europa Conference League first qualifying round against the Montenegrin side Dečić after being named in the starting line-up.

=== LNZ Cherkasy ===
On 31 January 2024, Jashari signed for the Ukrainian Premier League club LNZ Cherkasy.

== International career ==
On 31 May 2021, Jashari received a call-up from Kosovo for the friendly matches against Guinea and Gambia. Eight days later, on 8 June 2021, he made his debut with Kosovo in a friendly match against Guinea after coming on as a substitute at 76th minute in place of Rron Broja.

On 18 November 2024, during a 2024–25 UEFA Nations League C game against Lithuania, he scored his first goal with Kosovo at the 5th minute, but was expelled after receiving a direct red car at the end of the first half. Kosovo went on to win the game 1–0.

== Career statistics ==
=== International ===
As of match played 1 October 2026

Appearances and goals by national team and year
National team	Year	Apps	Goals
Kosovo	2021	1	0
Kosovo	2022	2	0
Kosovo	2023	0	0
Kosovo	2024	4	1
Kosovo	2025	6	0
Kosovo	2026	2	0
Total		15	1

Scores and results list Kosovo's goal tally first, score column indicates score after each Jashari goal.

List of international goals scored by Jashari
No.	Date	Venue	Cap	Opponent	Score	Result	Competition
1	18 November 2024	Fadil Vokrri Stadium, Pristina, Kosovo	6	Lithuania	1–0	1–0	2024–25 UEFA Nations League C

== Honours ==
- Kosovar Superliga
  - Winners (1): 2017
- Kosovar Supercup
  - Winners (1): 2016–17
