= Bledar Hajdini =

Kosovo-Albanian footballer

Personal information
- Full name: Bledar Hajdini
- Date of birth: 19 June 1995 (age 31)
- Place of birth: Fürstenfeldbruck, Germany
- Height: 1.91 m (6 ft 3 in)
- Position: Goalkeeper

Youth career
- –2013: Hysi
- 2013–2015: Prishtina

Senior career*
Years	Team	Apps	(Gls)
2015–2018	Trepça'89	65	(0)
2018–2020	Llapi	7	(0)
2019	→ Ballkani (loan)	7	(0)

International career^{‡}
2017	Kosovo	1	(0)
- * Club domestic league appearances and goals as of 5 October 2019 ‡ National team caps and goals as of 13 November 2017

Bledar Hajdini (born 19 June 1995) is a Kosovo Albanian professional footballer who last played as a goalkeeper for Kosovan club Llapi.

== Club career ==
=== Early career ===
Hajdini began his football career playing for hometown club Hysi at the age of ten. During his time at the club, one of his youth coaches described him as a "gifted" goalkeeper, he spent eight years at the club before moving to Prishtina in 2013 and played two years before moving to Trepça'89.

=== Trepça'89 ===
In June 2015, Hajdini joined Football Superleague of Kosovo side Trepça'89.

=== Llapi ===
On 1 June 2018, Hajdini joined Football Superleague of Kosovo side Llapi.

==== Loan at Ballkani ====
On 14 December 2018, Hajdini joined Football Superleague of Kosovo side Ballkani, on loan until the end of 2018–19 season.

== International career ==
On 2 October 2016, Hajdini received a call-up from Kosovo for a 2018 FIFA World Cup qualification matches against Croatia and Ukraine. On 13 November 2017, he made his debut with Kosovo in a friendly match against Latvia after coming on as a substitute at 68th minute in place of Samir Ujkani.

== Personal life ==
Hajdini was born in Fürstenfeldbruck, Germany from Kosovo Albanian parents from Podujevo.

== Honours ==
Trepça '89

- Kosovo Superleague: 2016–17
- Kosovar Supercup: 2017
