= Kabba Sambou =

Gambian footballer

Personal information
- Date of birth: 20 April 1996 (age 30)
- Place of birth: Manjai Kunda, The Gambia
- Height: 1.90 m (6 ft 3 in)
- Position: Midfielder

Team information
- Current team: Bourges

Senior career*
Years	Team	Apps	(Gls)
2014–2015	Banjul Hawks		
2015–2016	Stade de Mbour		
2016–2017	Trepça'89		
2017–2019	Skënderbeu Korçë	24	(0)
2020–2021	Samtredia	25	(0)
2021–	Bourges	9	(1)
2022–	Bourges B	1	(0)

International career
2015–2016	Gambia	6	(0)
- * Club domestic league appearances and goals as of 04:29, 21 February 2022 (UTC)

Kabba Sambou (born 20 April 1996) is a Gambian professional footballer who plays as a midfielder for Championnat National 1 club Bourges.

== Club career ==
Born in Manjai Kunda, Sambou has played club football for Banjul Hawks, Stade de Mbour, Trepça'89, Skënderbeu Korçë and Samtredia.

== International career ==
Sambou made his international debut for the Gambia in 2015.
