= Berat Hyseni =

Kosovar footballer

Personal information
- Date of birth: 26 October 1986 (age 39)
- Place of birth: SFR Yugoslavia
- Height: 1.80 m (5 ft 11 in)
- Position: Striker

Youth career
- 2000–2005: Flamurtari

Senior career*
Years	Team	Apps	(Gls)
2005–2008	Flamurtari	44	(20)
2007–2008	Tirana	10	(0)
2008–2009	Prishtina	20	(8)
2009–2010	Teuta	17	(1)
2010–2012	Trepça '89	48	(15)
2011	Hysi		
2013	Drenica		
2013	Prishtina		
2014	Ferizaj		
2014–2015	Trepça '89		
2015	Hajvalia	2	(0)
2016	Prishtina	2	(1)
2016–2017	Llapi	24	(8)
2018	Ballkani	3	(0)
2019	Llapi		
- * Club domestic league appearances and goals

Berat Hyseni (Serbo-Croatian: Berat Hiseni; born 26 October 1986) is a Kosovar former footballer.

== Club career ==
A journeyman striker, Hyseni started his career with Pristina side KF Flamurtari but then moved to Albania with KF Tirana in January 2008 after signing an 18-month contract with a foreign club release clause. However, he only managed to complete 6 unsuccessful months at the club before moving back to Kosovo with Prishtina, signing a 12-month contract. After a good season back in Kosovo Hyseni decided on a move back to the Albanian Superliga, this time with Teuta Durrës.
