= Demush Mavraj Stadium =

Stadium in Istog, Kosovo

Demush Mavraj Stadium is a stadium in Istog and is the home ground of KF Istogu of the First Football League of Kosovo. It has a seating capacity of 6,000.
