= Mirlind Daku =

Albanian footballer (born 1998)

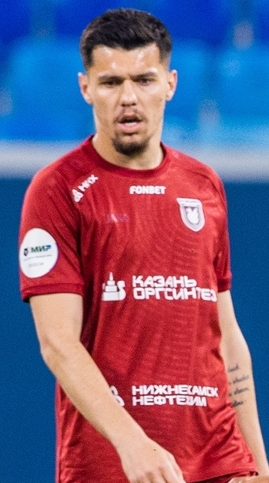

Personal information
- Date of birth: 1 January 1998 (age 28)
- Place of birth: Përlepnicë, Republic of Kosova
- Height: 1.92 m (6 ft 4 in)
- Position: Striker

Team information
- Current team: Spartak Moscow
- Number: 19

Youth career
- Gjilani
- –2017: Hajvalia

Senior career*
Years	Team	Apps	(Gls)
2017	Hajvalia	3	(0)
2017–2018	Llapi	45	(23)
2018–2021	Osijek II	15	(2)
2019–2020	→ Kukësi (loan)	13	(1)
2020–2021	→ Ballkani (loan)	42	(35)
2021–2023	Osijek	12	(3)
2022–2023	→ Mura (loan)	49	(24)
2023–2026	Rubin Kazan	80	(37)
2026–	Spartak Moscow	12	(3)

International career^{‡}
2017–2020	Kosovo U21	12	(3)
2020–2021	Kosovo	5	(0)
2023–	Albania	22	(1)
- * Club domestic league appearances and goals as of 22 November 2026 ‡ National team caps and goals as of 15 November 2026

Mirlind Daku (Albanian pronunciation: [miɾˈlind ˈdaku]; born 1 January 1998) is a professional footballer who plays as a striker for Russian Premier League club Spartak Moscow and the Albania national team.

Daku began his senior career with Hajvalia, making his professional debut in the Kosovo Superleague before joining Llapi in 2017, where his prolific form earned him a move abroad to Osijek in 2018. He later spent time on loan at Kukësi, Ballkani and Mura, notably becoming one of the top scorers in Slovenia's Slovenian PrvaLiga. Since joining Rubin Kazan in 2023, Daku has established himself as a key attacking player in the Russian Premier League.

At international level, he represented the Kosovo national team in 2020 and 2021, before switching allegiance to Albania in 2023. Following his debut, Daku became part of Albania's regular squad during the UEFA Euro 2024 qualifying campaign, contributing to the team's qualification, and later making his debut in a major international tournament at UEFA Euro 2024.

== Club career ==
=== Early career at Hajvalia ===
Daku began playing youth football in one of the two biggest clubs in his hometown, Gjilani, where he later moved to Hajvalia, a club based near Pristina, where he was spotted in his early teens for his technical ability and finishing instinct. Starting from Hajvalia's youth system, he quickly progressed through the club's ranks and began training with the senior squad while still a teenager. His early performances in youth competitions earned him recognition as one of the most promising young forwards in the Kosovar system. During the 2016–17 season, Daku made his senior debut for Hajvalia in the Kosovo Superleague, registering three league appearances before the club's financial difficulties led to the departure of several players. Despite limited opportunities at the senior level, he was noted for his work rate and off-the-ball movement, which caught the attention of Llapi's scouting staff. By the end of 2016, Daku had already scored multiple goals for Hajvalia's youth teams and had begun to attract attention from other Superleague clubs. His performances ultimately earned him a move to Llapi in January 2017, where he signed his first long-term professional contract.

=== Llapi ===
On 24 January 2017, Daku signed a five-year contract with Kosovo Superleague club Llapi. He made his debut for Llapi on 18 February 2017 in the Kosovar Cup fifth round against Feronikeli, coming on as a 95th-minute substitute in place of Berat Hyseni and scoring his side's second goal during a 4–2 away win after penalties.

In his first full season with the club, Daku quickly established himself as one of the most promising young forwards in the Kosovo Superleague, known for his pace, intelligent movement, and clinical finishing. Between 2017 and 2018, he made around 45 appearances and scored 23 goals in all competitions for Llapi, helping the club consistently challenge for the upper positions in the league table.

During the 2017–18 season, Daku enjoyed a breakout campaign, scoring 17 league goals and finishing among the top scorers of the Superleague. His goals were instrumental in helping Llapi secure third place in the championship and qualify for the Kosovar Cup semi-finals. Thanks to his performances, he was widely recognized by local media as one of the most exciting attacking prospects in Kosovar football.

Daku's performances at Llapi attracted interest from several clubs abroad, and his consistent scoring form led to his first call-up to the Kosovo U21 side. In later years, when Daku moved to international clubs such as Osijek and Rubin Kazan, Llapi benefited financially through a sell-on clause, reportedly earning around €180,000 from his transfer to the Russian Premier League.

=== Osijek ===
On 20 July 2018, Daku signed a four-year contract with Osijek, one of the leading clubs in the Croatian First League, in what was described as a major step forward for a Kosovar Superleague player. Upon his arrival, Daku was assigned to the club's reserve side, Osijek II, competing in the Croatian Second League. He made his debut on 25 August 2018 in a 2–2 away draw against Šibenik, starting the match and playing 71 minutes before being substituted. Eight days later, he scored his first goal for Osijek II in a 1–0 home win over Sesvete, securing the team's first victory of the season. Throughout his first season, Daku adapted to a higher level of competition, playing primarily as a centre forward but occasionally deployed as a supporting striker. His performances in the Croatian Second League were praised for his physicality and pressing, though he faced strong competition for a starting spot from the club's more experienced forwards. By the end of the 2018–19 season, Daku had recorded 18 league appearances and 5 goals for Osijek II. His solid adaptation, consistent performances and work ethic led to consideration for promotion to the first team's pre-season training camp, with Osijek's coaching staff highlighting him as a player with long-term potential.

==== Loan at Kukësi ====
On 24 July 2019, Daku joined Kategoria Superiore club Kukësi on a season-long loan. He made his competitive debut on 18 August 2019 in the 2019 Albanian Supercup against Partizani Tirana, coming on as a 66th-minute substitute for Vasil Shkurtaj. A month later, Daku scored his first goal for the club in his sixth appearance, a 3–1 away win over Shkumbini in the first round of the Albanian Cup. During his half-season spell, Daku featured mainly as a rotational forward in both league and cup competitions due to competition from established forwards such as Vasil Shkurtaj and Patrick Friday Eze. Using the loan spell to gain experience in Albania's top division, he made a total of 10 appearances and scored once in all competitions before returning to Osijek.

==== Loan at Ballkani ====
On 11 January 2020, Daku was loaned out to Kosovo Superleague club Ballkani until the end of the 2019–20 season. He made his debut on 29 February 2020 in a 0–0 away draw against Prishtina, coming on as a 59th-minute substitute for Artur Magani.

Despite the season being interrupted shortly after due to the COVID-19 pandemic, Daku quickly established himself as one of Ballkani's key attacking options. He scored several important goals after the league's restart, helping the club compete for the championship title. By the end of the campaign, he had registered 9 goals in 17 appearances across all competitions. His strong performances at Ballkani marked a turning point in his career, drawing attention from both domestic and international clubs and earning him a recall to NK Osijek for the following season.

==== Return from loan as first team player ====
Following two loan spells in Kosovo and Albania, Daku returned to Osijek main team ahead of the 2021–22 Croatian First League. On 8 August 2021, he made his first-team debut in a 2–1 away win against Hrvatski Dragovoljac, coming on as a 78th-minute substitute for Antonio Mance. The following day, Daku signed a new four-year contract with Osijek, confirming his promotion to the senior squad on a long-term basis. Three days later, he made his continental debut in the third qualifying round against Bulgarian side CSKA Sofia, appearing as a second-half substitute for Yevhen Cheberko. On 15 September 2021, he scored his first goal for the first team in a 3–0 away win over Bednja Beletinec in the first round of the Croatian Cup.

On 19 September 2021, Daku came off the bench and scored two goals in a 3–2 victory for Osijek, helping the team secure three points in a tightly contested league match. He also demonstrated composure in knockout matches: in the Croatian Cup match against Slaven Belupo, he entered from the 72nd minute and scored the decisive penalty to take Osijek into the semi-finals. In the 2021-22 Croatian First League season, Daku made 12 appearances for Osijek, scoring 3 goals in the league.

Despite not yet being a regular starter, his contract extension until summer 2024 underlines the club's belief in his long-term potential.

==== Loan at Mura ====
On 7 February 2022, Daku was loaned out to Slovenian PrvaLiga club Mura until the end of the 2021–22 season. Six days later, he made his debut against Bravo after being named in the starting line-up, providing two assists during a 2–2 home draw.

Daku quickly adapted to Slovenian football, becoming one of Mura's most effective attacking players in the second half of the campaign. He scored five goals in sixteen league appearances, helping the club secure a top-half finish in the league table. Following his strong performances, Mura announced in June 2022 that Daku's loan would be extended for another season.

During his second season in Slovenia, Daku established himself as one of the most prolific forwards in the league. He consistently featured in the starting line-up and was instrumental in Mura's attacking play. On 27 August 2022, he scored his first goal of the season in a 3–1 home win over Gorica.

Daku continued his scoring form throughout the campaign, registering multiple braces and decisive goals. By the end of the season, he had scored 20 goals in 36 league appearances, finishing as the league's top scorer and earning widespread recognition for his performances.

His achievements attracted interest from clubs abroad, with media reports linking him with potential moves to Croatia and Hungary.

=== Rubin Kazan ===
On 11 July 2023, Daku signed a three-year contract with Russian Premier League club Rubin Kazan. He made his official debut for Rubin on 22 July 2023 in a league match against Lokomotiv Moscow, coming on as a substitute in the second half. On 13 August 2023, Daku scored his first goal for the club in a 2–0 home win over Fakel Voronezh. Throughout the 2023–24 season, Daku became one of Rubin's most consistent attacking options, noted for his work rate and finishing ability. He ended the campaign with 9 goals and 5 assists across all competitions, helping the team secure a mid-table finish in their first season back in the top flight. On 13 July 2025, after a successful debut campaign and continued progress, Daku's contract was extended until June 2029, reflecting the club's long-term confidence in his development.

During the 2024–25 season, Daku became one of the standout performers for Rubin Kazan. He finished the campaign as the club's top scorer with 15 goals and added 6 assists across all competitions, confirming his status as one of the most effective forwards in the league. Among his most notable moments was a last-minute winner against Akron Tolyatti in a 2–1 league victory in August 2024, which drew praise from both local media and supporters for his composure under pressure. On 21 September 2024, Daku captained Rubin Kazan for the first time in a League match against CSKA Moscow, leading his team to a 1–1 draw. Another key performance came in May 2025, when he scored a stoppage-time equaliser in a 2–2 home draw against CSKA Moscow, earning the Man of the Match award and further establishing himself as a clutch performer for the club. Due to his consistency and work ethic, Daku played a decisive role in Rubin's attack, helping the club secure a stable mid-table finish in their second consecutive season back in the Russian Premier League.

During the 2025–26 season, Daku established himself as Rubin Kazan's leading striker. By early October 2025, he had made 10 league appearances, all as a starter, scoring 8 goals and registering 26 shots on target. On 28 September 2025, he scored twice in a 3–0 home victory over Akron Tolyatti, earning the man of the match award and further cementing his reputation as one of the league's most effective forwards. His consistent form has positioned him among the top scorers in the Russian Premier League, with local media highlighting his improved finishing, off-the-ball movement, and work rate as key factors in Rubin's strong early-season performance.

On 26 July 2026, Daku started the 2026–27 season scoring in the 12th minute of a 3–1 defeat to Krasnodar on the opening matchday of the 2026–27 Russian Premier League. In the following week on 2 August 2026, Daku scored the winning goal in Rubin Kazan's 2–1 victory over Akron Tolyatti before receiving an emotional farewell from teammates and supporters after the final whistle, amid growing reports linking him with a move to Spartak Moscow.

=== Spartak Moscow ===
On 6 August 2026, Daku joined fellow Russian Premier League club Spartak Moscow on a three-year contract with an option for a further year. Three days later, Daku made his debut for the club, coming on in the 68th minute of a 2–1 home defeat to Krasnodar. The following week, Daku made his first start for the club and provided an assist in a 2–1 away victory over Baltika on 16 August, helping Spartak secure its first win of the season.

== International career ==
=== Kosovo ===
On 21 March 2017, Daku received his first international call-up from the Kosovo under-21 team for a UEFA European Under-21 Championship qualifier against the Republic of Ireland. He made his debut on 9 November in a 0–4 home defeat to Israel, coming on as a 54th-minute substitute for Ardit Gashi.

On 22 January 2018, Daku was called up to the Kosovo senior national team for a scheduled friendly against Azerbaijan, but the match was cancelled after the teams were drawn in the same UEFA Nations League group. He eventually made his senior debut on 11 November 2020 in a friendly against Albania, coming on as an 84th-minute substitute for Florent Hadergjonaj.

=== Albania ===
In June 2023, Daku obtained an Albanian passport, making him eligible to represent the Albania national team. On 1 September, he received his first call-up from Albania for the UEFA Euro 2024 qualifying matches against the Czech Republic and Poland. Daku made his debut on 7 September in a 1–1 away draw against the Czech Republic, coming on as a second-half substitute. Three days later, he scored his first international goal in a 2–0 home victory over Poland, finding the net with his first touch shortly after coming on in the 62nd minute. He made three further appearances as Albania finished top of the group for the first time, collecting 15 points, level with the Czech Republic but ahead on head-to-head record, and qualified for the European Championship finals for the second time.

On 8 June 2024, Daku was included in Albania's 26-man squad for the UEFA Euro 2024. He made his only appearance of the tournament on 19 June, coming on as a late substitute with Albania trailing 2–1 against Croatia and contributing to the build-up to Klaus Gjasula's stoppage-time equaliser in the 2–2 draw. After the match, Daku was filmed using a megaphone while leading supporters in offensive chants directed towards North Macedonia and Serbia. Daku subsequently apologised for his actions, before UEFA imposed a two-match suspension following a disciplinary review.

During the 2026 FIFA World Cup qualification, Daku made limited appearances in Group K, primarily as a substitute. Albania secured a place in the play-offs for the first time in its history.

== Career statistics ==
=== Club ===
As of match played 22 November 2026

Appearances and goals by club, season and competition
Club	Season	League			Cup		Europe		Other		Total	
Club	Season	Division	Apps	Goals	Apps	Goals	Apps	Goals	Apps	Goals	Apps	Goals
Hajvalia	2016–17	Kosovo Superleague	3	0	—		—		—		3	0
Llapi	2016–17	Kosovo Superleague	15	6	4	1	—		—		19	7
Llapi	2017–18	Kosovo Superleague	30	17	3	3	—		—		33	20
Llapi	Total		45	23	7	4	—		—		52	27
Osijek II	2018–19	Croatian Second League	15	2	—		—		—		15	2
Kukësi (loan)	2019–20	Kategoria Superiore	13	1	2	1	—		1 (Note: Appearance in Albanian Supercup)	0	16	2
Ballkani (loan)	2019–20	Kosovo Superleague	8	4	3	1	—		—		11	5
Ballkani (loan)	2020–21	Kosovo Superleague	34	31	1	0	—		—		35	31
Ballkani (loan)	Total		42	35	4	1	—		—		46	36
Osijek	2021–22	Croatian First League	12	3	3	1	1 (Note: Appearances in UEFA Europa Conference League)	0	—		16	4
Mura (loan)	2021–22	Slovenian PrvaLiga	16	5	0	0	—		—		16	5
Mura (loan)	2022–23	Slovenian PrvaLiga	33	19	2	2	3	2	—		38	23
Mura (loan)	Total		49	24	2	2	3	2	—		54	28
Rubin Kazan	2023–24	Russian Premier League	28	10	5	0	—		—		33	10
Rubin Kazan	2024–25	Russian Premier League	26	15	3	0	—		—		29	15
Rubin Kazan	2025–26	Russian Premier League	24	10	5	1	—		—		29	11
Rubin Kazan	2026–27	Russian Premier League	2	2	0	0	—		—		2	2
Rubin Kazan	Total		80	37	13	1	—		—		93	38
Spartak Moscow	2026–27	Russian Premier League	12	3	4	2	—		—		16	5
Career total			271	128	35	12	4	2	1	0	311	142

=== International ===
As of match played 15 November 2026

Appearances and goals by national team and year
National team	Year	Apps	Goals
Kosovo
Kosovo	2020	1	0
Kosovo	2021	4	0
Total		5	0
Albania
Albania	2023	5	1
Albania	2024	4	0
Albania	2025	6	0
Albania	2026	7	0
Total		22	1

Scores and results list Albania's goal tally first, score column indicates score after each Daku goal.

List of international goals scored by Mirlind Daku
No.	Date	Venue	Opponent	Score	Result	Competition
1	10 September 2023	Arena Kombëtare, Tirana, Albania	Poland	2–0	2–0	UEFA Euro 2024 qualifying
