= Florent Hasani =

Footballer (born 1997)

Personal information
- Date of birth: 30 March 1997 (age 29)
- Place of birth: Vushtrri, FR Yugoslavia
- Height: 1.83 m (6 ft 0 in)
- Positions: Forward; attacking midfielder

Team information
- Current team: Kayserispor
- Number: 9

Youth career
- –2014: Vushtrria

Senior career*
Years	Team	Apps	(Gls)
2014–2015	Vushtrria	15	(1)
2015–2018	Trepça '89	76	(21)
2018–2021	Diósgyőr	91	(10)
2021	Hapoel Kfar Saba	10	(0)
2021–2022	Gyirmót	32	(3)
2022–2023	Tirana	50	(26)
2024–2025	Rapid București	31	(1)
2025–2026	Boluspor	36	(22)
2026	Amedspor	19	(4)
2026–	Kayserispor	1	(0)

International career^{‡}
2017–2018	Kosovo U21	10	(3)
2019–	Kosovo	8	(1)
- * Club domestic league appearances and goals as of 9 August 2026 ‡ National team caps and goals as of 15 November 2020

Florent Hasani (born 30 March 1997) is a Kosovan professional footballer who plays as a forward or an attacking midfielder for Turkish club Kayserispor.

== Club career ==
=== Early career and Trepça '89 ===
Hasani was part of all youth teams of Vushtrria until December 2014, where he was promoted to the senior team with which he played 15 matches and scored a goal. On 20 June 2015, Hasani joined Kosovo Superleague side Trepça '89.

=== Diósgyőr ===
On 25 January 2018, Hasani joined as free transfer to Nemzeti Bajnokság I club Diósgyőr. Four days later, the club confirmed that Hasani's transfer was permanent. On 20 February 2018, he made his debut with Diósgyőr in the 2017–18 Magyar Kupa round of 16 against Vác after being named in the starting line-up.

=== Hapoel Kfar Saba ===
On 10 February 2021, Hasani signed a one-and-a-half-year contract with Israeli Premier League club Hapoel Kfar Saba. Nine days later, he made his debut with Hapoel Kfar Saba in the 2020–21 Israel State Cup eighth round against Kafr Qasim after being named in the starting line-up.

=== Gyirmót ===
On 23 June 2021, Hasani signed a two-year contract with the newly promoted Nemzeti Bajnokság I club Gyirmót. On 30 July 2021, he made his debut in a 1–1 home draw against MTK Budapest after coming on as a substitute at 85th minute in place of Kristóf Herjeczki.

== International career ==
=== Under-21 ===
On 21 March 2017, Hasani received a call-up from Kosovo U21 for a 2019 UEFA European Under-21 Championship qualification match against Republic of Ireland U21, and made his debut after being named in the starting line-up.

=== Senior ===
On 22 January 2018, Hasani received his first call-up from national senior team in a friendly match against Azerbaijan. The match however was cancelled two days later, which prolonged his debut. His debut with Kosovo came on 10 September 2019 in the UEFA Euro 2020 qualifying match against England after coming on as a substitute at 85th minute in place of Valon Berisha. One month after debut, Hasani scored his first goal for Kosovo in his second appearance for the country in a 1–0 home minimal win over Gibraltar.

== Career statistics ==
=== Club ===
As of match played 9 August 2026

Appearances and goals by club, season and competition
Club	Season	League			National cup (Note: Includes Magyar Kupa, Israel State Cup, Albanian Cup, Cupa României)		Other		Total	
Club	Season	Division	Apps	Goals	Apps	Goals	Apps	Goals	Apps	Goals
Diósgyőr	2017–18	Nemzeti Bajnokság I	12	0	3	0	—		15	0
Diósgyőr	2018–19	Nemzeti Bajnokság I	31	7	2	1	—		33	8
Diósgyőr	2019–20	Nemzeti Bajnokság I	33	3	3	2	—		36	5
Diósgyőr	2020–21	Nemzeti Bajnokság I	15	0	1	0	—		16	0
Diósgyőr	Total		91	10	9	3	—		100	13
Hapoel Kfar Saba	2020–21	Israeli Premier League	10	0	2	0	—		12	0
Gyirmót	2021–22	Nemzeti Bajnokság I	32	3	3	0	—		35	3
Tirana	2022–23	Kategoria Superiore	34	16	3	2	5 (Note: Two appearances in UEFA Champions League, two appearances in UEFA Conference League, one appearance and one goal in Albanian Supercup)	1	42	19
Tirana	2023–24	Kategoria Superiore	16	10	—		4 (Note: Appearances in UEFA Conference League)	0	20	10
Tirana	Total		50	26	3	2	9	1	62	29
Rapid București	2023–24	Liga I	17	0	—		—		17	0
Rapid București	2024–25	Liga I	14	1	3	0	—		17	1
Rapid București	Total		31	1	3	0	—		34	1
Boluspor	2024–25	TFF 1. Lig	18	8	—		—		18	8
Boluspor	2025–26	TFF 1. Lig	18	14	—		—		18	14
Boluspor	Total		36	22	—		—		36	22
Amedspor	2025–26	TFF 1. Lig	19	4	—		—		19	4
Kayserispor	2026–27	TFF 1. Lig	1	0	—		—		1	0
Career total			270	66	20	5	9	1	299	72

=== International ===
As of 15 November 2020

Appearances and goals by national team and year
National team	Year	Apps	Goals
Kosovo
Kosovo	2019	3	1
Kosovo	2020	5	0
Total		8	1

Scores and results list Kosovo's goal tally first, score column indicates score after each Hasani goal.

List of international goals scored by Florent Hasani
No.	Date	Venue	Opponent	Score	Result	Competition	Ref.
1	10 October 2019	Fadil Vokrri Stadium, Pristina, Kosovo	Gibraltar	1–0	1–0	Friendly	

== Honours ==
Trepça'89

- Kosovo Superleague: 2016–17
- Kosovar Supercup: 2017

Tirana

- Albanian Cup runner-up: 2022–23
- Albanian Supercup: 2022

Individual

- Kategoria Superiore top scorer: 2022–23
- Kategoria Superiore Team of the Year: 2022–23
- Kategoria Superiore Player of the Month: April 2023
