= KF Deçani =

Football club in Kosovo

- Full name: Klub Futbollistik Deçan
- Founded: 1949; 76 years ago
- Ground: Deçan Sports Field
- Capacity: 500
- League: Kosovo Third League

KF Deçani (Albanian: Klubi Futbollistik Deçani) is a professional football club from Kosovo which competes in the Third League (Group A). The club is based in Deçan. Their home ground is the Deçan Sports Field which has a viewing capacity of 500.
