= Shahin Haxhiislami Stadium =

Stadium in Pejë, Kosovo

Coordinates: 42°54′18″N 21°11′41″E

Stadiumi Shahin Haxhiislami
- Shahin Haxhiislami
- Interactive map of Stadiumi Shahin Haxhiislami
- Location: Pejë, Kosovo
- Owner: Municipality of Pejë
- Operator: Besa Pejë
- Capacity: 8,500
- Surface: Grass
- Scoreboard: LED
- Field size: 105 by 68 metres (114.8 yd × 74.4 yd)

Construction
- Built: 1938
- Opened: 1938
- Renovated: 2024-ongoing
- Cost: 14,500,000€(2024-ongoing)

Tenant
- Besa Pejë

The Shahin Haxhiislami Stadium is a multi-use stadium located in Pejë, Kosovo. It primarily hosts football matches and serves as the home ground for KF Besa Pejë, a team in the Kosovar Superliga. The stadium has a seating capacity of 8,500 after renovation completed and features a grass playing surface that measures 105 by 68 meters.In addition to being the home of KF Besa Pejë, the stadium is also used by KF Deçani. The facility is owned by the Municipality of Pejë.

== History ==
The stadium is named after Shahin Haxhiislami, one of the football legends of Peja. It is owned by the Municipality of Pejë and also hosts matches for other local teams because their stadiums do not meet the minimum standards for holding matches, including football clubs from neighboring municipalities such as KF Deçani (Shahin Haxhiislami Stadium) (http://wikimapia.org/7387281/Shahin-Haxhiislami-Stadium).

For more detailed information, you might visit resources like Wikipedia or sport-related websites that offer insights into various stadiums in Kosovo (Shahin Haxhiislami Stadium) (https://sport.wikisort.org/stadium/en/Stadium/Shahin_Haxhiislami_Stadium).

== Renovation ==
The Shahin Haxhiislami Stadium in Pejë is undergoing a comprehensive renovation project with a budget of 14.5 million euros. This significant investment is spearheaded by the Ministry of Culture, Youth, and Sports, under the leadership of Minister Hajrulla Çeku. The renovation aims to modernize the stadium entirely, enhancing its facilities and infrastructure to meet contemporary standards.

The project involves a detailed planning phase, with the completion of the implementation project to be followed by the selection of contractors through a formal tender process (https://www.dukagjini.com/stadiumi-shahin-haxhiislami-ne-peje-ne-renovim-14-5-milione-euro-per-projektin/) (https://telegrafi.com/ministri-sportit-hajrulla-ceku-ndane-14-5-milione-euro-per-rinovimin-e-stadiumit-shahin-haxhiislami-ne-peje/) (https://indeksonline.net/ndahen-14-5-milione-euro-per-renovimin-e-stadiumit-shahin-haxhiislami/) (https://albeu.com/sport/ministria-e-sportit-ndan-14-5-milione-euro-per-rinovimin-e-stadiumit-shahin-haxhiislami-ne-peje/653180/).
