= Bajram Aliu Stadium =

Stadium in Skenderaj, Kosovo

Coordinates: 42°44′48.4″N 20°47′39.8″E

- KF Drenica
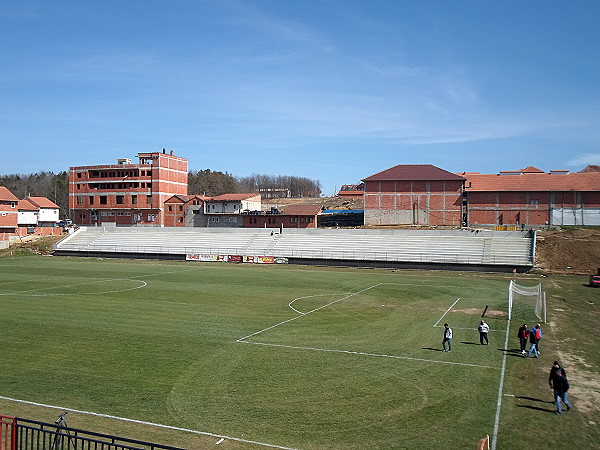
- Interactive map of Bajram Aliu Stadium
- Former names: Skenderaj City Stadium (until 1999)
- Location: Skenderaj, Kosovo
- Owner: Municipality of Skenderaj
- Operator: KF Drenica
- Capacity: 1,000
- Surface: Grass
- Field size: 105 by 68 metres (114.8 yd × 74.4 yd)

Tenant
- KF Drenica

The Bajram Aliu Stadium is a multi-use stadium in Skenderaj, Kosovo. It is currently used mostly for football matches and is the home ground of Drenica of the Kosovar Superliga. The stadium holds around 1,000 people. It was built prior to the Kosovo War.

After a 25-year attempt to join the UEFA (and by extension FIFA), Kosovo was permitted to join in 2016, which opened them up to much-needed financial sponsorship that would be put into renovating and restoring existing football facilities.
