= FC Hajvalia =

Football club in Kosovo

Hajvalia
- Full name: Klubi Futbollistik Hajvalia
- Nickname: Arushat (Bears)
- Short name: FCH
- Founded: 1999; 27 years ago
- Dissolved: 2018
- Ground: Hajvalia Stadium
- Capacity: 1,000
- League: None
- 2017–18 (last): Kosovo First League, 15th of 16
- Website: http://fchajvalia.com/
Home colours	Away colours

FC Hajvalia (Albanian: Klubi Futbollistik Hajvalia), commonly known as Hajvalia, was a professional football club based in the village Hajvalia of Pristina, Kosovo. The club last played in the First Football League of Kosovo, which is the second-tier of football in the country.

In June 2014, after Luis Suárez was suspended from FIFA due to biting Giorgio Chiellini, Hajvalia sent an offer to Liverpool for Suárez to play with Hajvalia for the four-month duration of his ban. The offer was £24,000 (€30,000) and a salary of €1,500 for each month.

== Honours ==
KF Hajvalia honours
Type	Competition	Titles	Seasons/Years
Domestic	First Football League of Kosovo	1	2011–12

== Notable former players ==
This is a list of KF Hajvalia players with senior national team appearances:

Albania and Kosovo

1. (Albania) (Kosovo) Mirlind Daku
2. (Albania) (Kosovo) Arbër Hoxha
3. (Kosovo) Betim Halimi
4. (Kosovo) Liridon Leci
5. (Kosovo) Armend Thaqi
6. (Kosovo) Suad Sahiti
7. (Kosovo) Eduar Orani

== See also ==
- FC Hajvalia 2020
