= Riza Lushta Stadium =

Stadium in Mitrovica, Kosovo

Coordinates: 42°53′17.0″N 20°51′41.1″E

- Mitrovica Old Stadium
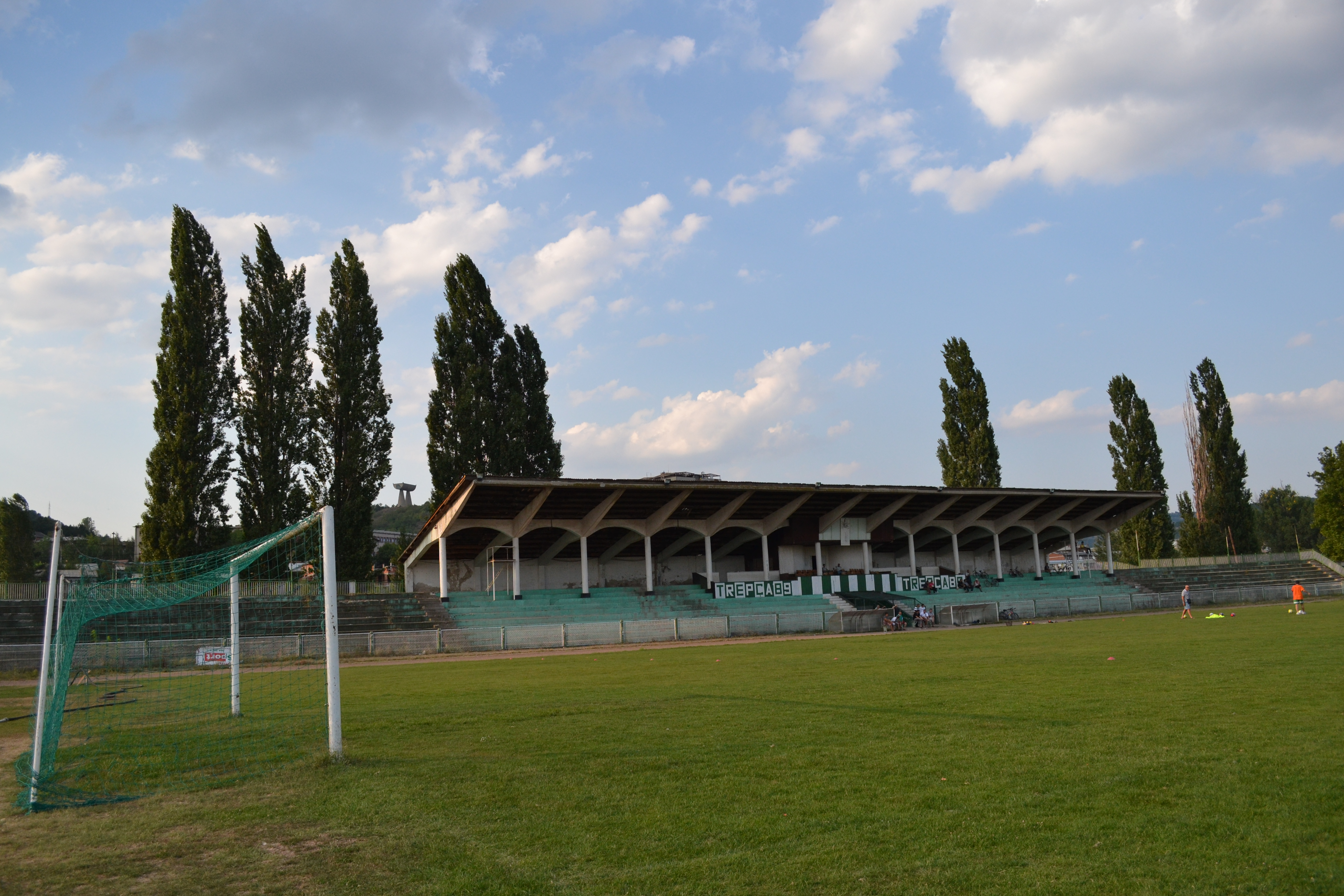
- Interactive map of Riza Lushta Stadium
- Full name: Riza Lushta Old City Stadium
- Former names: Mitrovica Old City Stadium (before 1999)
- Location: Mitrovica, Kosovo
- Owner: Municipality of Mitrovica
- Operator: KF Trepça '89
- Capacity: 5,000
- Surface: Grass
- Field size: 105 by 68 metres (114.8 yd × 74.4 yd)

Construction
- Opened: 1938

Tenant
- KF Trepça '89

Riza Lushta Stadium is a multi-use stadium in Mitrovica, Kosovo. It was named after notable Juventus player Riza Lushta, who was from Mitrovica, and is used mostly for football matches and is the home ground of Trepça'89 of the Kosovar Superliga. The stadium has a capacity of 5,000 people with 1,879 individual seats.
