= KF Istogu =

Football club in Kosovo

Istogu
- Full name: Klubi Futbollistik Istogu
- Nickname(s): Troftat (The Trouts)
- Founded: 1947; 78 years ago
- Ground: Demush Mavraj Stadium
- Chairman: Fazli Bytyçi
- Manager: Bekim Shotani
- League: Kosovo First League
- 2022–23: Kosovo First League – Group A, 4th of 10
Home colours	Away colours

FC Istogu (Albanian: Klubi Futbollistik Istogu), commonly known as Istogu is a football club based in Istog, Kosovo. The club plays in the First Football League of Kosovo, which is the second tier of football in the country.

== History ==
The club have been playing in the lower divisions of Yugoslavia and now Kosovo for almost all the time since they were founded. KF Istogu don't have any big merits which they have been winning. In the season 2007–08, their best scorer ever, Suad Saliagić was sold to FC Prishtina for an unknown sum, he scored 26 goals in 11 games which is a record in Kosovo. Since the 1960s, the club has always been a "middle club" in the lower divisions.

=== Supporters ===
Their fan club is known as Gjimmat and they were formed in 2000.

== Players ==
=== Current squad ===
As of 29 January 2020

Note: Flags indicate national team as defined under FIFA eligibility rules; some limited exceptions apply. Players may hold more than one non-FIFA nationality.

No.	Pos.	Nation	Player
—	GK	(Kosovo) KOS	Dardan Podrimaj
—	GK	(Kosovo) KOS	Valmir Hajrizaj
—	DF	(Kosovo) KOS	Bleon Alushaj
—	DF	(Kosovo) KOS	Dardan Bajraktari
—	DF	(Kosovo) KOS	Egzon Kurteshi
—	DF	(Kosovo) KOS	Fatmir Rexhaj
—	DF	(Kosovo) KOS	Granit Ademaj
—	DF	(Kosovo) KOS	Ragip Mazrekaj
—	MF	(Cameroon) CMR	Dylan Effa (on loan from Ballkani)
—	MF	(Kosovo) KOS	Faton Neziri

No.	Pos.	Nation	Player
—	MF	(Kosovo) KOS	Herolind Zekaj
—	MF	(Kosovo) KOS	Kushtrim Sylaj
—	MF	(Cameroon) CMR	Marius Stephane
—	MF	(Kosovo) KOS	Qëndrim Jahaj (captain)
—	MF	(Kosovo) KOS	Qëndrim Krasniqi
—	FW	(Kosovo) KOS	Erjon Qeta
—	FW	(Kosovo) KOS	Florent Rexhaj
—	FW	(Kosovo) KOS	Malsor Blakaj
—	FW	(England) ENG	Yoan Marc-Olivier
—	FW	(Timor-Leste) TLS	Bertrand Dorsalfin

== Personnel ==
Current technical staff
Position	Name
Head coach	(Kosovo) Bekim Shotani
Assistant coaches	(Kosovo) Hysni Kabashi
Assistant coaches	(Kosovo) Mehdi Arifaj
Goalkeeping coach	(Kosovo) Kemajl Saliagić
