= KF Trepça '89 =

Football club in Kosovo

Trepça '89
- Full name: Klubi Futbollistik Trepça '89
- Nicknames: Minatorët (Miners); Luanët e nëntokës (Underground lions)
- Short name: T'89
- Founded: 1940; 86 years ago as Rudari Stari Trg; 1992; 34 years ago as Minatori '89
- Ground: Riza Lushta Stadium,
- Capacity: 5,000
- President: Abedin Zeka
- Manager: Gani Sejdiu
- League: Kosovo First League
- 2025–26: Kosovo First League, 5th of 18
Home colours	Away colours

Klubi Futbollistik Trepça '89, commonly known as Trepça '89, is a professional football club based in Mitrovica, Kosovo. The club plays in the First Football League of Kosovo, which is the second tier of football in the country.

== History ==
=== Rudari (1940–1992) ===
The club was founded as KF Rudari Stari Trg in 1940. Rudari won the Kosovo Province League in 1956, 1958 and 1960.

=== Minatori 89 (1992–2000) ===
In 1992, The club was refounded as Minatori '89 and relocated from Stari Trg to Mitrovicë. The number 89, symbolizes the year of the 1989 Kosovo miners' strike.

=== Trepça’89 (2000–present) ===
In the 2016–17 season, they were crowned champions for the first time in the club's history. KF Trepça '89 was the first Kosovan club to participate in the UEFA Champions League qualification in 2017.

== Honours ==
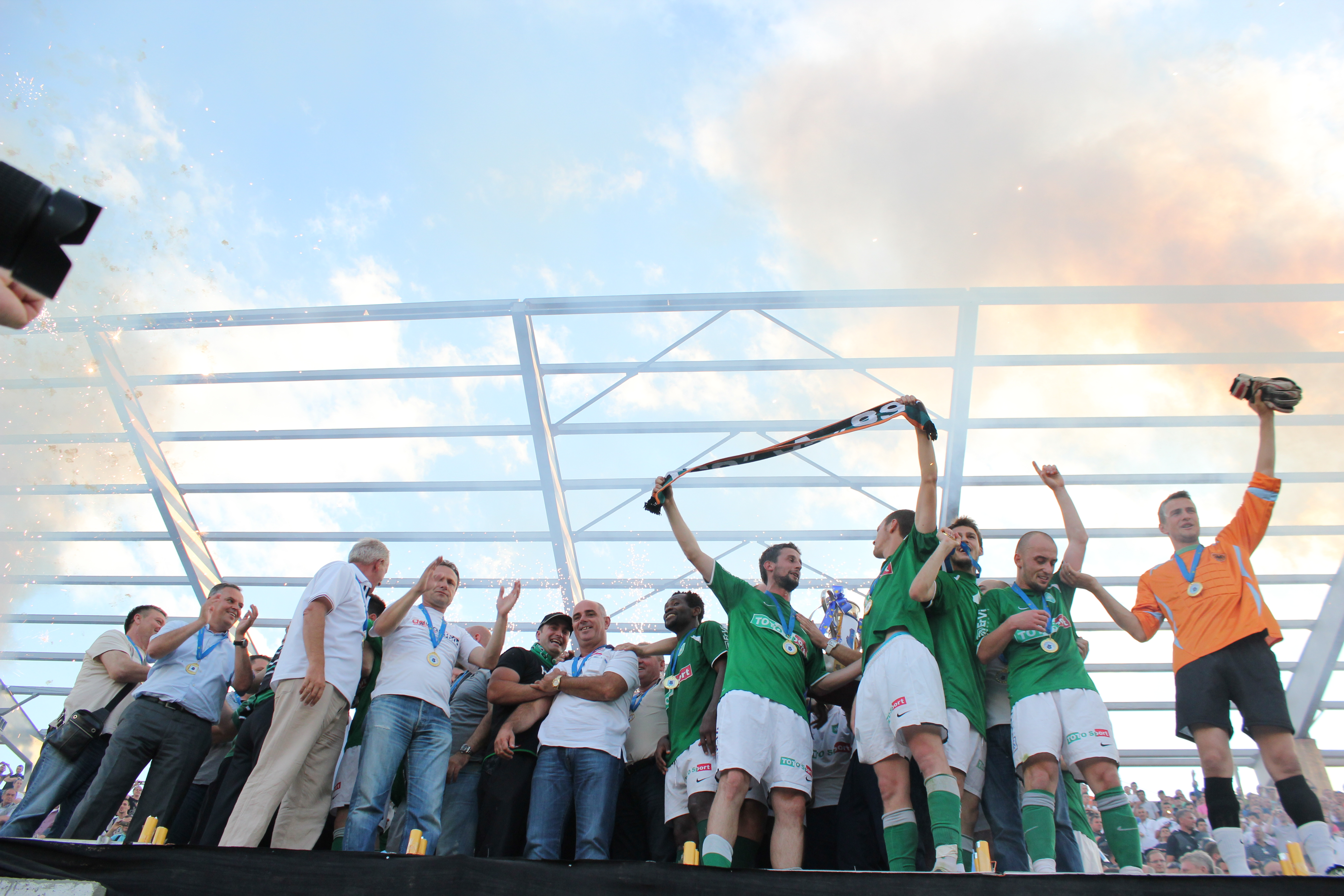
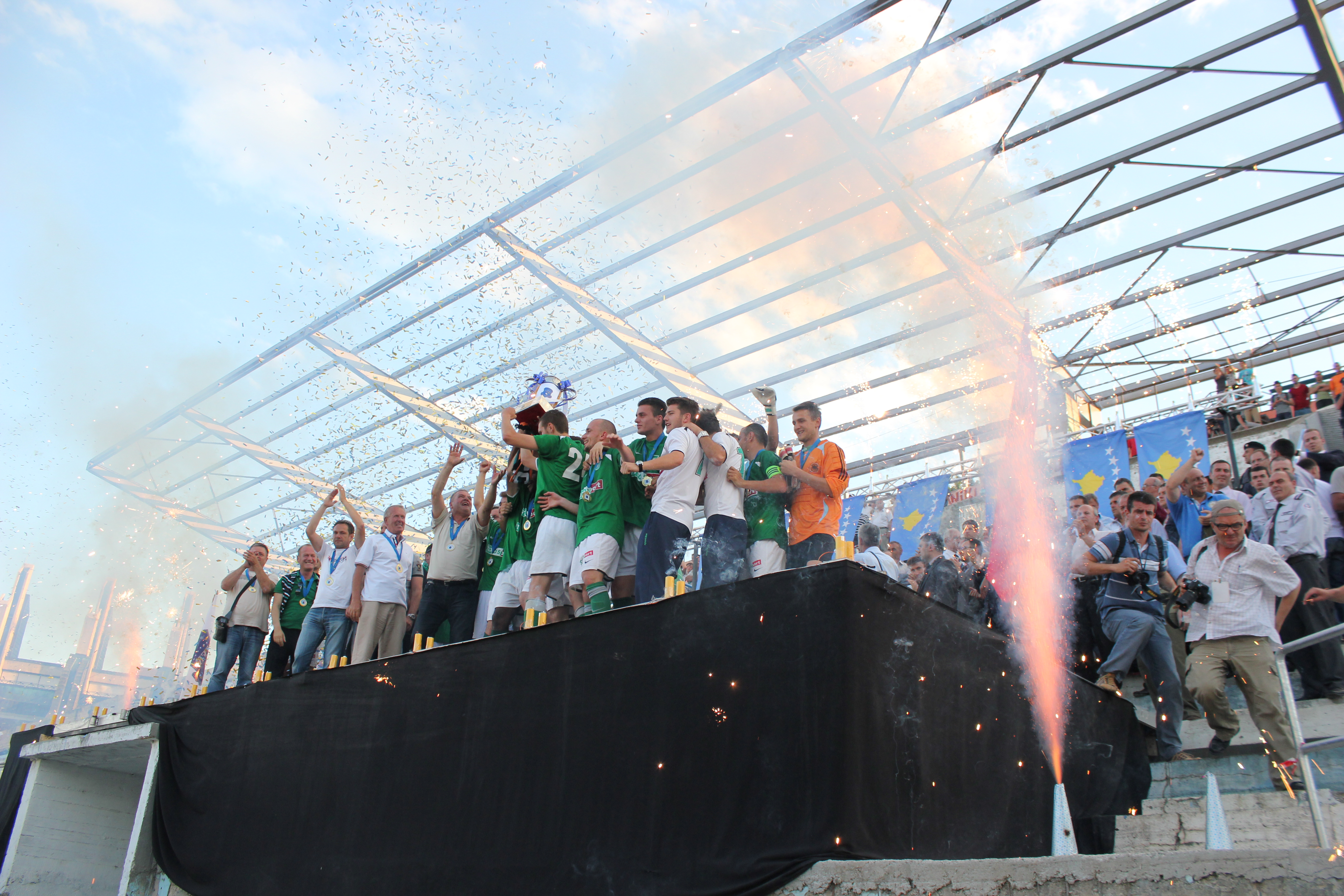
Trepça'89, the winner of 2011–12 Kosovar Cup.

KF Trepça'89 honours
Type	Competition	Titles	Seasons/Years
Domestic	Football Superleague of Kosovo	1	2016–17
Domestic	First Football League of Kosovo	1	2009–10
Domestic	Kosovar Cup	1	2011–12
Domestic	Kosovar Supercup	1	2016–17

== Players ==
=== Current squad ===
As of 19 February 2024

Note: Flags indicate national team as defined under FIFA eligibility rules; some limited exceptions apply. Players may hold more than one non-FIFA nationality.

No.	Pos.	Nation	Player
1	GK	KOS	Amar Emini
3	DF	KOS	Edison Dushi
4	DF	KOS	Erdin Dushi
5	DF	KOS	Fatbardh Latifi
6	MF	KOS	Lulzim Peci (vice-captain)
7	MF	KOS	Samir Sahiti (captain)
8	MF	KOS	Milazim Bajraktari
9	FW	KOS	Ardian Hasani
10	FW	KOS	Bleon Sekiraqa
11	FW	KOS	Armend Gashi
12	GK	KOS	Donat Kaçiu
14	MF	KOS	Andi Mehmeti
16	FW	KOS	Ylli Ngucati
17	MF	KOS	Dard Beka

No.	Pos.	Nation	Player
18	FW	KOS	Egzon Fazliu
19	DF	GHA	Augustine Ameworlorna
21	FW	NGR	John Idahor
22	DF	ALB	Xhoel Plaku
23	MF	CMR	Williams Boum Kouame
24	FW	GAM	Madi Karamo Fatty
25	FW	GUI	Mohamed Diaby
26	FW	ALB	Kostika Beçka (on loan from Skënderbeu Korçë)
28	DF	KOS	Andi Kadriu
30	MF	KOS	Erion Doberdoli
45	MF	BRA	Jhonatas da Silva
99	MF	KOS	Ardi Qorri
89	MF	KOS	Elvidon Islami
NA	MF	KOS	Butrint Idrizi
NA	FW	KOS	Enkel Ramiqi

=== Retired numbers ===
Note: Flags indicate national team as defined under FIFA eligibility rules; some limited exceptions apply. Players may hold more than one non-FIFA nationality.

No.	Pos.	Nation	Player
15	MF	KOS	Erion Kajtazi (2022) – posthumous honour)

=== Notable former players ===
This is a list of KF Trepça '89/Minatori 89 players with senior national team appearances:

Albania and Kosovo

1. (Albania) (Kosovo) Arbnor Muja
2. (Kosovo) Leotrim Bekteshi
3. (Kosovo) Rron Broja
4. (Kosovo) Bledar Hajdini
5. (Kosovo) Florent Hasani
6. (Kosovo) Muharrem Jashari
7. (Kosovo) Lapidar Lladrovci
8. (Kosovo) Arb Manaj
9. (Kosovo) Ron Raçi
10. (Kosovo) (Albania) Emir Sahiti

Other countries

1. (The Gambia) Kabba Sambou
2. (North Macedonia) Sedat Berisha
3. (North Macedonia) Martin Mirchevski
4. (North Macedonia) Darko Tofiloski
5. (Palestine) Mohamed Darwish

== Personnel ==
Current technical staff
Position	Name
Head coach	(Kosovo) Gani Sejdiu
Assistant coach	(Kosovo) Seid Onbashi
Assistant coach	(Kosovo) Samir Sahiti
Goalkeping coach	(Kosovo) Enver Salihi
Club Doctor	(Kosovo) Veton Pllana
Physiotherapist	(Kosovo) Endrit Bimbashi
Physiotherapist	(Kosovo) Nysret Ymeri
Board members
Office	Name
President	(Kosovo) Abedin Zeka
Vice-President	(Kosovo) Arsim Islami
Sports director	(Kosovo) Veton Çitaku

=== Historical list of coaches ===
- (Kosovo) Gani Sejdiu (Aug 2012 - Sep 2013)
- (Kosovo) Arsim Abazi (22 Sep 2013 - Oct 2013)
- (Kosovo) Fahredin Duraku (29 Sep 2014 - 22 Mar 2015)
- (Kosovo) Afrim Tovërlani (23 Mar 2015 - Jun 2015)
- (Kosovo) Arsim Thaqi (24 Jun 2015 - Dec 2015)
- (Kosovo) Gani Sejdiu (13 Jan 2016 - May 2016)
- (Kosovo) Bekim Shotani (17 Jun 2016 - 15 Sep 2016)
- (Kosovo) Veton Çitaku (16 Sep 2016 - 11 Jan 2017)
- (North Macedonia) Zekirija Ramadani (17 Jan 2017 - 13 Sep 2017)
- (Kosovo) Sabit Osmani (14 Sep 2017 - 18 Oct 2017) (caretaker)
- (Kosovo) Gani Sejdiu (18 Oct 2017 - 3 Dec 2017)
- (Albania) Gugash Magani (29 Dec 2017 - 1 Nov 2018)
- (Kosovo) Shpëtim Idrizi (4 Aug 2019 - 2024)
- (North Macedonia) (Albania) Xhengis Rexhepi (2024)

== Trepça'89 in Europe ==
Trepça'89 competed in the UEFA Champions League for the first time in the 2017–18 season, entering at the first qualifying round. On 19 June 2017, in Nyon, the draw was held and Trepça'89 were drawn against Faroese side Víkingur Gøta.

Season	Competition	Round	Opponent	Home	Away	Agg.
2017–18	UEFA Champions League	1Q	(Faroe Islands) Víkingur Gøta	1–4	1–2	2–6

=== UEFA club coefficient ranking ===
As of June 2022

Rank	Team	Points	Country Part
398	(Kosovo) Gjilani	1000	1.633
399	(Kosovo) Feronikeli	1500	1.633
400	(Kosovo) Trepça'89	0.500	1.633
401	(Armenia) Aarat	1500	1.625
402	(Republic of Ireland) Sligo	1000	1.625
403	(Armenia) Shirak	1250	1.625
