= List of Albania international footballers =

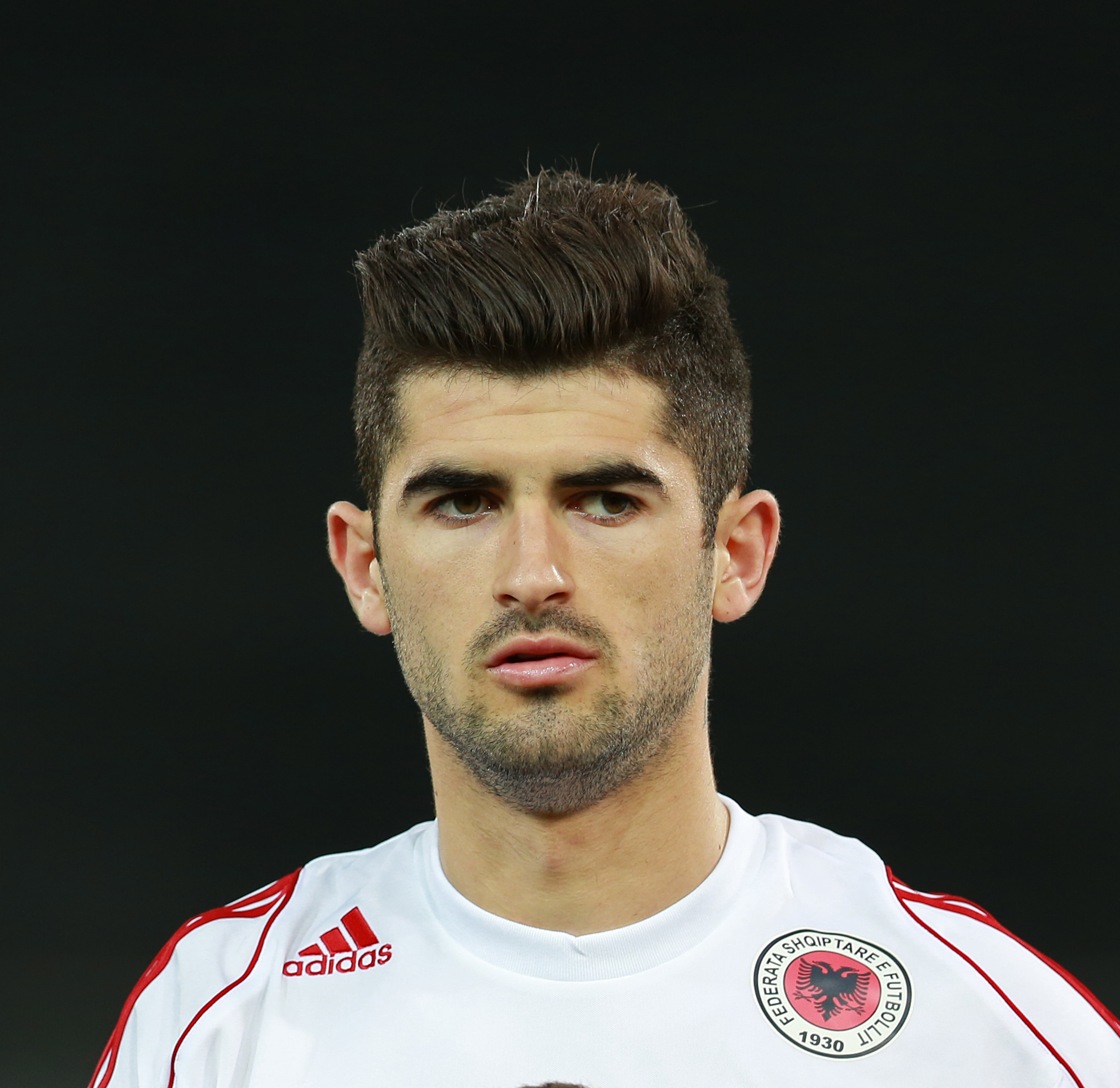
Elseid Hysaj is the most capped player in the history of Albania with 100 caps.

The Albania national football team has represented Albania in international association football since 1946. The Albanian Football Association (Federata Shqiptare e Futbollit; FSHF) was founded in 1930 and became a member of the Fédération Internationale de Football Association (FIFA) two years later. However, the team did not play its first official international match until 7 October 1946, suffering a 2–3 defeat to Yugoslavia in the 1946 Balkan Cup. In 1954, Albania was one of the founding members of the Union of European Football Associations (UEFA) and continues to compete as a member of the organisation, which encompasses the countries of Europe and Israel. As of March 2026, Albania have played 400 international fixtures, winning 110, drawing 84 and losing 206. They have played more fixtures against Romania than any other national side, losing 13 of the 19 matches between the sides. In global and continental competitions, the team has competed in qualification groups for both the FIFA World Cup, since 1966, and the UEFA European Championship, since 1964. The team has qualified for one international tournament during its history, UEFA Euro 2016, where they were eliminated in the group stage. In minor competitions, the team won the 1946 Balkan Cup and the 2000 Malta International Football Tournament.

As of June 2026, Albania's most capped player is Elseid Hysaj, who has made 100 appearances for the senior team during his career. He made his international debut in February 2013 in a 1–2 defeat against Georgia and won his record-breaking 94th cap in October 2025 in a 4–2 victory over Jordan in a friendly match. The nation's leading goalscorer is Erjon Bogdani, who scored 18 times during his international career between 1996 and 2013. Bogdani overtook the previous record holder, Alban Bushi, in September 2011 after scoring in three consecutive international fixtures. Bushi had claimed the record from Altin Rraklli in 2004.

The first player to reach 25 caps for Albania was Panajot Pano, who reached the total in April 1973 in a match against East Germany. Pano was later named as his country's "golden player" by the FSHF during the UEFA Jubilee Awards in 2004 as Albania's "single most outstanding player". Foto Strakosha is the most capped goalkeeper in the national team's history and held the overall cap record until 2011, when his total was surpassed by Altin Lala. The record was later surpassed by Lorik Cana in June 2014, before eventually being overtaken by Hysaj.

== Players ==
Appearances and goals are composed of FIFA World Cup and UEFA European Championship and each competition's required qualification matches, as well as UEFA Nations League matches and numerous international friendly tournaments and matches. Players are listed by number of caps. If the number of caps is equal, the players are then listed by time of debut. Statistics updated following match played on 6 June 2026.

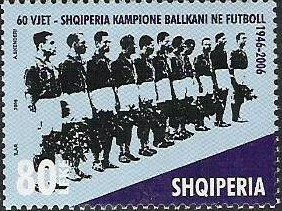
A 60th anniversary stamp commemorating the team's victory in the 1946 Balkan Cup

Note: Albania played a friendly match against Kosovo on 13 November 2015, before Kosovo became a member of FIFA or UEFA and is not recognised as an official match by either organisation but is recognised by the FSHF. As such, the match is included from the totals in the table below and the '#1' symbol indicates which players appeared in the match.

	Key
*	Still active for the national team (Note: Players who are still active for the national team are players who have not retired from international football and are, subsequently, eligible to be called up.)
=	Player is tied for the number of caps
GK	Goalkeeper
DF	Defender
MF	Midfielder
FW	Forward

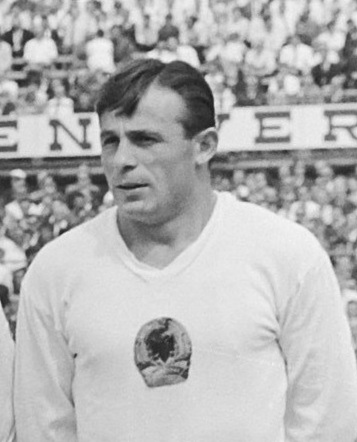
Panajot Pano was selected by the Albanian Football Federation in 2004 as the most outstanding player of the past 50 years.

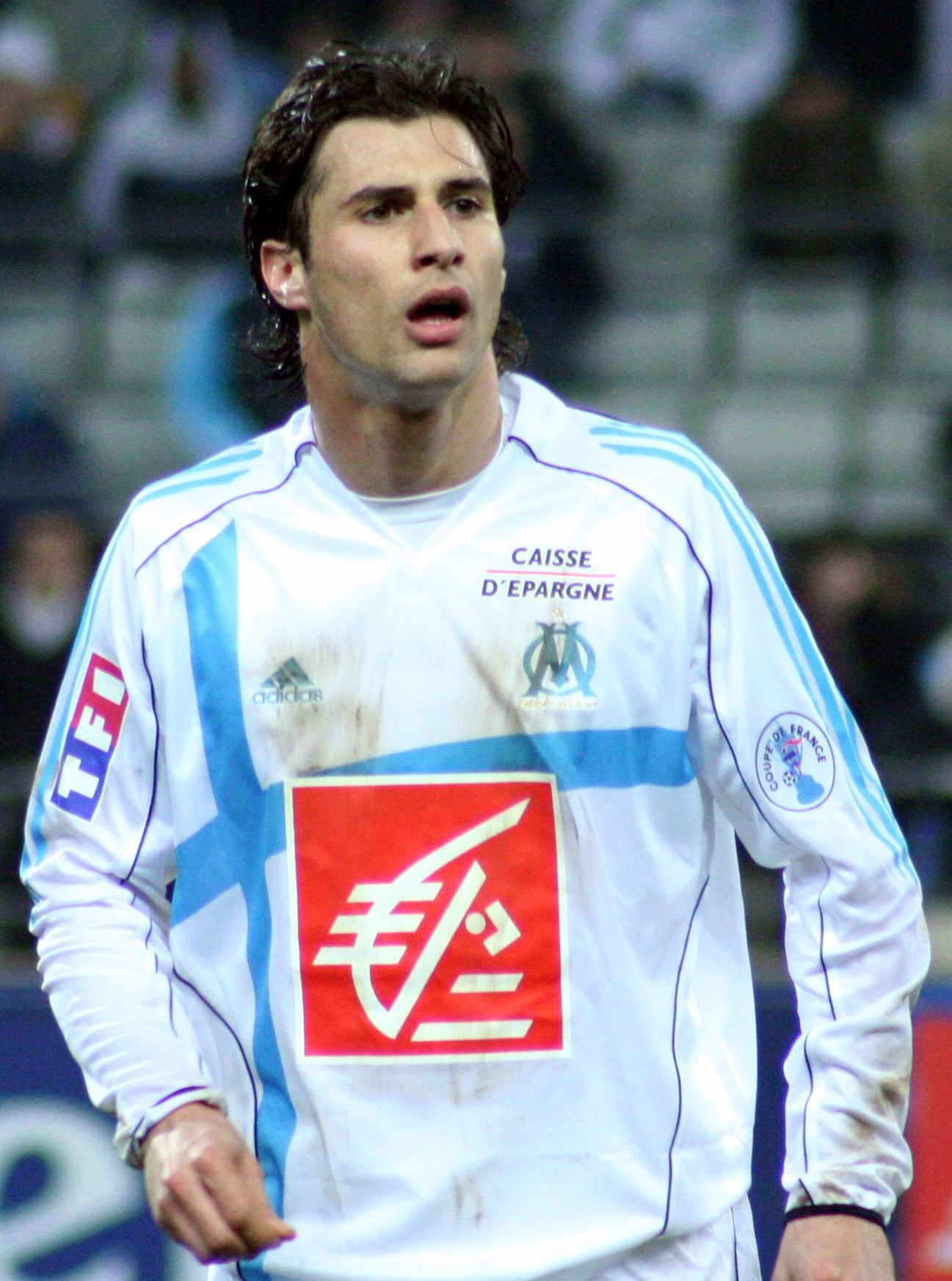
Lorik Cana played 93 times for Albania and held the caps record between 2014 and 2025.

Albania national team footballers of all times
No.	Name	Position	National team career	Caps	Goals	Honours
1	Elseid Hysaj*	DF	2013–2026	100^{#1}	2	
2	Lorik Cana	DF	2003–2016	93^{#1}	1	
3	Etrit Berisha*	GK	2012–2024	81^{#1}	0	
4	Altin Lala	MF	1998–2011	79	3	
5	Klodian Duro	MF	2001–2011	77	6	
6	Ervin Skela	MF	2000–2011	75	13	(Malta) 2000 Rothmans
=	Erjon Bogdani	FW	1996–2013	75	18	
8	Foto Strakosha	GK	1990–2005	73	0	
=	Ansi Agolli	DF	2005–2017	73	3	
=	Berat Gjimshiti*	DF	2015–2026	73^{#1}	1	
11	Odise Roshi	MF	2011–2022	71^{#1}	5	
12	Andi Lila	DF	2007–2018	70^{#1}	0	
13	Igli Tare	FW	1997–2007	68	10	
14	Alban Bushi	FW	1995–2007	67	14	
=	Altin Haxhi	MF	1995–2009	67	3	
16	Armend Dallku	DF	2005–2013	64	1	
17	Altin Rraklli	FW	1992–2005	63	11	
18	Sokol Cikalleshi	FW	2014–2024	60^{#1}	13	
19	Rudi Vata	DF	1990–2001	59	5	(Malta) 2000 Rothmans
20	Ervin Bulku	MF	2002–2014	56	1	
21	Amir Abrashi	MF	2013–2024	51	1	
22	Hamdi Salihi	FW	2006–2015	50	11	
=	Mërgim Mavraj	DF	2012–2019	50	3	
=	Ylber Ramadani*	MF	2018–2026	50	1	
25	Arjan Xhumba	DF	1989–2003	48	0	
=	Bekim Balaj	FW	2012–2022	48	9	
=	Myrto Uzuni*	MF	2018–2026	48	6	
=	Qazim Laçi*	MF	2020–2026	48	4	
29	Elvin Beqiri	DF	2002–2009	47	0	
=	Jahmir Hyka	MF	2007–2018	47	2	
=	Ardian Ismajli*	MF	2018–2026	47	3	
=	Thomas Strakosha*	GK	2017–2026	47	0	
33	Sulejman Demollari	MF	1983–1995	45	1	
=	Ermir Lenjani	MF	2013–2022	45^{#1}	5	
=	Frédéric Veseli*	DF	2015–2023	45^{#1}	0	
=	Rey Manaj*	FW	2015–2025	45^{#1}	11	
=	Nedim Bajrami*	MF	2021–2026	45	8	
38	Debatik Curri	DF	2006–2014	44	1	
=	Ledian Memushaj	MF	2010–2021	44	1	
40	Edvin Murati	MF	1998–2006	43	4	(Malta) 2000 Rothmans
=	Besnik Hasi	MF	2000–2007	43	2	
=	Arjan Beqaj	GK	1998–2011	43	0	(Malta) 2000 Rothmans
43	Kristjan Asllani*	MF	2022–2026	42	4	
44	Edmond Kapllani	FW	2004–2014	41	6	
=	Arlind Ajeti*	DF	2014–2026	41^{#1}	1	
46	Ilir Shulku	DF	1993–1999	40	1	
47	Bledar Kola	MF	1990–2001	39	6	
=	Devi Muka	MF	1998–2007	39	1	(Malta) 2000 Rothmans
=	Armando Sadiku*	FW	2012–2023	39^{#1}	12	
50	Armando Broja*	MF	2020–2026	37	6	
51	Hysen Zmijani	MF	1984–1995	36	2	
52	Kristi Vangjeli	DF	2007–2012	35	0	
53	Geri Çipi	DF	1995–2005	34	0	(Malta) 2000 Rothmans
=	Migjen Basha	MF	2013–2019	34^{#1}	3	
55	Mario Mitaj*	DF	2021–2026	33	0	
56	Sokol Kushta	FW	1987–1996	31	10	
=	Nevil Dede	DF	1995–2007	31	0	
=	Taulant Xhaka	MF	2014–2019	31^{#1}	1	
59	Artur Lekbello	MF	1987–1996	30	0	
=	Arjan Bellaj	MF	1994–2003	30	1	
61	Adrian Aliaj	MF	2002–2006	29	8	
=	Keidi Bare*	MF	2018–2024	29	2	
=	Klaus Gjasula	MF	2019–2024	29	1	
64	Panajot Pano	FW	1963–1973	28	4	
=	Arben Minga	FW	1980–1989	28	2	
66	Mirel Josa	MF	1984–1992	27	1	
=	Elis Bakaj	MF	2007–2013	27	1	
=	Emiljano Vila	MF	2009–2014	27	3	
=	Burim Kukeli	MF	2012–2017	27	0	
=	Taulant Seferi*	MF	2019–2026	27	3	
71	Marash Kumbulla*	MF	2019–2025	26	0	
=	Jasir Asani*	FW	2023–2026	26	6	
73	Indrit Fortuzi	FW	1992–2002	25	1	
=	Ervin Fakaj	DF	1995–2002	25	1	
=	Florian Myrtaj	FW	2002–2006	25	3	
=	Ergys Kaçe	MF	2013–2019	25	2	
=	Arbër Hoxha*	FW	2024–2026	25	1	
78	Loro Boriçi	FW	1946–1957	24	6	1946 Balkan Cup
=	Iván Balliu*	DF	2017–2026	24	0	
80	Perlat Musta	GK	1981–1993	23	0	
=	Gjergji Muzaka	MF	2008–2013	23	1	
82	Muhedin Targaj	DF	1980–1985	22	3	
=	Agustin Kola	FW	1980–1994	22	1	
84	Safet Berisha	DF	1970–1981	21	0	
=	Skënder Hodja	MF	1984–1990	21	0	
=	Enea Mihaj*	MF	2018–2025	21	0	
87	Rexhep Spahiu	DF	1946–1952	20	0	1946 Balkan Cup
=	Muhamet Dibra	DF	1946–1953	20	0	1946 Balkan Cup
=	Ramazan Rragami	FW	1965–1973	20	1	
=	Lefter Millo	MF	1988–1996	20	0	
=	Samir Ujkani^{KOS}	GK	2009–2013	20	0	
92	Sllave Llambi	MF	1946–1950	19	0	1946 Balkan Cup
=	Eduard Abazi	MF	1985–1997	19	2	
=	Redi Jupi	MF	1995–2006	19	0	(Malta) 2000 Rothmans
=	Gilman Lika	MF	2008–2013	19	0	
=	Admir Teli	DF	2006–2013	19	0	
=	Sabien Lilaj	MF	2011–2018	19	0	
=	Naser Aliji*	MF	2015–2025	19^{#1}	0	
99	Aristidh Parapani	MF	1946–1952	18	1	1946 Balkan Cup
=	Salvador Kaçaj	MF	1991–1997	18	1	
=	Blendi Nallbani	GK	1989–2002	18	0	(Malta) 2000 Rothmans
102	Vasif Biçaku	MF	1946–1950	17	1	1946 Balkan Cup
=	Fatmir Vata	FW	1996–2002	17	0	
=	Besart Berisha^{KOS}	FW	2006–2009	17	1	
=	Isli Hidi	GK	2005–2011	17	0	
=	Shkëlzen Gashi	MF	2013–2016	17	1	
=	Ernest Muçi*	FW	2021–2026	17	3	
=	Mirlind Daku*	MF	2023–2026	17	1	
109	Shkëlqim Muça	MF	1982–1987	16	2	
=	Edmond Dalipi	FW	1993–2000	16	1	(Malta) 2000 Rothmans
=	Edgar Çani	FW	2012–2016	16	4	
112	Lin Shllaku	MF	1963–1970	15	0	
=	Sabah Bizi	MF	1967–1976	15	1	
=	Ilir Përnaska	FW	1971–1981	15	5	
=	Haxhi Ballgjini	MF	1976–1985	15	1	
=	Fatbardh Jera	DF	1985–1990	15	0	
=	Saimir Malko	DF	1994–1996	15	0	
=	Valdet Rama	MF	2013–2015	15	3	
=	Lorenc Trashi*	MF	2019–2021	15	1	
120	Xhevdet Shaqiri	DF	1947–1957	14	0	
=	Ali Mema	MF	1963–1967	14	0	
=	Ferid Rragami	MF	1980–1985	14	0	
=	Bedri Omuri	MF	1982–1987	14	3	
=	Bledi Shkëmbi	MF	2002–2006	14	0	
=	Ilion Lika	GK	2002–2006	14	0	
126	Bahri Kavaja	DF	1946–1950	13	0	
=	Qamil Teliti	FW	1946–1952	13	6	1946 Balkan Cup
=	Mahir Halili	MF	1996–1999	13	1	
=	Arjan Peço	MF	1996–2002	13	0	
=	Eros Grezda	MF	2017–2019	13	1	
=	Kastriot Dermaku	MF	2018–2021	13	1	
132	Zihni Gjinali	FW	1948–1952	12	3	
=	Fatbardh Deliallisi	DF	1957–1965	12	0	
=	Fatmir Frashëri	DF	1963–1970	12	0	
=	Mihal Gjika	DF	1971–1973	12	1	
=	Kliton Bozgo	FW	1993–2000	12	0	(Malta) 2000 Rothmans
=	Ardit Beqiri	DF	2002–2006	12	0	
=	Tefik Osmani	DF	2005–2013	12	0	
139	Qemal Vogli	GK	1947–1953	11	0	
=	Besim Fagu	DF	1946–1958	11	0	1946 Balkan Cup
=	Skënder Halili	DF	1963–1965	11	0	
=	Medin Zhega	FW	1965–1971	11	3	
=	Faruk Sejdini	MF	1971–1976	11	0	
=	Ilir Lame	MF	1980–1984	11	0	
=	Rrapo Taho	DF	1986–1993	11	0	
=	Adnan Oçelli	DF	1984–1993	11	0	
=	Kastriot Peqini	FW	1992–1993	11	0	
=	Mehmet Dragusha	MF	2003–2005	11	1	
=	Endri Çekiçi*	MF	2020–2022	11	1	
=	Juljan Shehu*	MF	2025–2026	11	0	
151	Arian Hametaj	DF	1982–1985	10	0	
=	Skënder Gega	DF	1987–1989	10	0	
=	Ylli Shehu	FW	1988–1995	10	1	
=	Arbën Milori	MF	1991–1995	10	0	
=	Gjergji Dëma	MF	1990–1997	10	0	
=	Alpin Gallo	DF	1994–1998	10	0	
=	Endrit Vrapi	MF	2006–2011	10	0	
158	Pal Mirashi	FW	1946–1950	9	4	1946 Balkan Cup
=	Mikel Janku	GK	1964–1967	9	0	
=	Teodor Vaso	DF	1967–1971	9	0	
=	Bujar Çani	DF	1970–1972	9	0	
=	Sefedin Braho	FW	1973–1983	9	1	
=	Alfred Ferko	MF	1986–1992	9	0	
=	Ledio Pano	MF	1987–1996	9	1	
=	Afrim Tole	MF	1995–1998	9	0	
166	Giacomo Poselli	GK	1946–1948	8	0	1946 Balkan Cup
=	Skënder Jareçi	FW	1949–1958	8	1	
=	Gëzim Kasmi	DF	1963–1971	8	0	
=	Iljaz Çeço	MF	1964–1971	8	0	
=	Koço Dinella	GK	1967–1973	8	0	
=	Rifat Ibërshimi	DF	1971–1976	8	0	
=	Ferdinand Lleshi	FW	1976–1981	8	0	
=	Petro Ruçi	DF	1982–1983	8	0	
=	Luan Vukatana	MF	1982–1983	8	0	
=	Ardian Mema	MF	1995–1998	8	0	
=	Ahmed Januzi	FW	2010–2013	8	0	
=	Orges Shehi	GK	2010–2016	8^{#1}	0	
=	Adrion Pajaziti*	MF	2025–2026	8	0	
179	Mehdi Bushati	MF	1963–1965	7	0	
=	Robert Jashari	FW	1963–1965	7	1	
=	Bashkim Muhedini	GK	1971–1973	7	0	
=	Millan Baçi	DF	1976–1981	7	1	
=	Kastriot Hysi	DF	1980–1981	7	0	
=	Kreshnik Çipi	DF	1980–1992	7	0	
=	Ilir Kepa	FW	1988–1993	7	1	
=	Artan Bano	MF	1993–1996	7	0	
=	Sokol Prenga	MF	1995–1997	7	0	
=	Franc Veliu	DF	2011–2013	7	0	
=	Alban Meha^{KOS}	MF	2012–2015	7	2	
=	Albi Doka*	DF	2020–2021	7	0	
=	Sherif Kallaku*	MF	2020–2022	7	0	
192	Bimo Fakja	MF	1946–1948	6	0	1946 Balkan Cup
=	Besim Boriçi	DF	1949–1950	6	0	
=	Refik Resmja	FW	1952–1963	6	1	
=	Astrit Ziu	DF	1970–1972	6	1	
=	Jani Kaçi	GK	1976–1981	6	0	
=	Vasillaq Zëri	FW	1976–1982	6	0	
=	Arjan Bimo	DF	1982–1985	6	0	
=	Halim Mersini	GK	1988–1989	6	0	
=	Agim Bubeqi	FW	1987–1989	6	0	
=	Alvaro Zalla	MF	1993–1996	6	0	
=	Fatos Daja	DF	1991–1997	6	0	
=	Enkeleid Dobi	FW	1995–2003	6	1	(Malta) 2000 Rothmans
=	Suad Liçi	MF	2000–2005	6	0	(Malta) 2000 Rothmans
=	Dorian Bylykbashi	MF	2006–2010	6	0	
=	Armando Vajushi	MF	2011–2014	6	1	
=	Herolind Shala^{KOS}	MF	2014–2016	6^{#1}	0	
=	Azdren Llullaku*	MF	2016–2017	6	0	
=	Emanuele Ndoj*	MF	2018–2019	6	1	
=	Hysen Memolla*	MF	2017–2021	6	0	
=	Giacomo Vrioni*	MF	2018–2022	6	0	
=	Arbnor Muçolli*	MF	2022–2024	6	0	
=	Enis Çokaj*	MF	2021–2025	6	0	
214	Sulejman Vathi	MF	1947–1950	5	0	
=	Sulejman Maliqati	GK	1950–1963	5	0	
=	Pavllo Bukoviku	FW	1963–1965	5	0	
=	Lorenç Vorfi	MF	1963–1967	5	0	
=	Perikli Dhales	DF	1970–1971	5	0	
=	Roland Luçi	FW	1981–1982	5	0	
=	Dashnor Bajaziti	FW	1980–1983	5	0	
=	Andrea Marko	MF	1980–1985	5	0	
=	Latif Gjondeda	MF	1987–1992	5	0	
=	Adrian Barbullushi	MF	1990–1992	5	0	
=	Xhevahir Kapllani	GK	1993–1996	5	0	
=	Zamir Shpuza	DF	1991–1997	5	0	
=	Albert Duro	MF	1999–2000	5	0	
=	Luan Pinari	DF	1998–2003	5	1	
=	Rezart Dabulla	DF	1999–2003	5	0	(Malta) 2000 Rothmans
=	Elvis Sina	DF	2002–2005	5	0	
=	Liridon Latifi*	MF	2017	5	0	
=	Egzon Binaku*	DF	2018	5	0	
=	Arbnor Muja*	MF	2023	5	0	
=	Indrit Tuci*	FW	2024–2025	5	0	
=	Anis Mehmeti*	MF	2023–2026	5	0	
235	Skënder Begeja	MF	1947	4	0	
=	Hamdi Bakalli	FW	1950–1953	4	0	
=	Fiqiri Duro	FW	1963–1965	4	0	
=	Jani Rama	GK	1967–1973	4	0	
=	Gani Xhafa	DF	1967–1973	4	0	
=	Milto Gurma	MF	1972–1976	4	0	
=	Kristaq Eksarko	DF	1983–1984	4	0	
=	Roland Iljadhi	DF	1987–1990	4	0	
=	Sotir Shkurti	GK	1987–1990	4	0	
=	Eqerem Memushi	DF	1990–1991	4	0	
=	Ermal Tahiri	MF	1990–1991	4	0	
=	Edmond Dosti	FW	1991–1995	4	0	
=	Viktor Paço	FW	1996–1997	4	0	
=	Përparim Daiu	DF	1995–1998	4	0	
=	Armir Grimaj	GK	1998–2000	4	0	(Malta) 2000 Rothmans
=	Roland Zajmi	FW	1995–2000	4	1	(Malta) 2000 Rothmans
=	Johan Driza	MF	1998–2000	4	0	(Malta) 2000 Rothmans
=	Vioresin Sinani	FW	2000–2002	4	1	(Malta) 2000 Rothmans
=	Hair Zeqiri	MF	2012	4	0	
=	Renato Arapi	DF	2011–2013	4	0	
=	Kamer Qaka*	MF	2017–2018	4	0	
=	Alban Hoxha*	GK	2015–2020	4	0	
=	Lindon Selahi*	MF	2019–2020	4	0	
=	Erion Hoxhallari*	MF	2020–2022	4	0	
=	Gentian Selmani*	GK	2021–2022	4	0	
=	Xhuliano Skuka*	DF	2022	4	1	
=	Medon Berisha*	MF	2024–2025	4	0	
=	Andi Hadroj*	DF	2022–2026	4	0	
263	Dodë Tahiri	GK	1946	3	0	1946 Balkan Cup
=	Alfred Bonati	GK	1947–1950	3	0	
=	Rexhep Lacej	FW	1949–1950	3	0	
=	Sabri Peqini	MF	1950–1952	3	0	
=	Muhamet Vila	DF	1952–1953	3	0	
=	Simon Dëda	FW	1953–1958	3	0	
=	Koleç Kraja	FW	1957–1963	3	2	
=	Mexhit Haxhiu	FW	1964–1965	3	1	
=	Bahri Ishka	FW	1964–1967	3	0	
=	Niko Xhaçka	FW	1965–1967	3	0	
=	Josif Kazanxhi	MF	1967	3	0	
=	Mehmet Xhafa	MF	1972–1973	3	0	
=	Ismet Hoxha	FW	1973	3	0	
=	Millan Vaso	MF	1973	3	0	
=	Agim Murati	FW	1973–1976	3	0	
=	Kujtim Çoçoli	DF	1981	3	0	
=	Alfred Zijai	MF	1986–1987	3	0	
=	Pjerin Noga	DF	1989–1990	3	0	
=	Arben Arbëri	FW	1989–1990	3	0	
=	Kujtim Majaçi	FW	1989–1990	3	0	
=	Arjan Stafa	DF	1989–1990	3	0	
=	Genc Ibro	DF	1990	3	0	
=	Aleksandër Vasi	MF	1992	3	0	
=	Avenir Dani	GK	1992	3	0	
=	Artan Pali	DF	1992–1995	3	0	
=	Anesti Qendro	MF	1992–1995	3	1	
=	Eduard Kaçaçi	FW	1990–1996	3	0	
=	Ilir Alliu	DF	1995–1996	3	0	
=	Ervin Lamce	MF	1995–1997	3	0	
=	Uliks Kotri	MF	1998	3	0	
=	Lulzim Hushi	DF	2002	3	0	
=	Paulin Dhëmbi	MF	2002	3	0	
=	Erion Xhafa	MF	2006–2007	3	0	
=	Blerim Rrustemi	DF	2007	3	0	
=	Agon Mehmeti	FW	2013	3	0	
=	Enis Gavazaj	MF	2018	3	0	
=	Kristi Qose*	MF	2014–2019	3	0	
=	Adrian Bajrami^{SUI}	DF	2022	3	1	
=	Eneo Bitri*	DF	2022	3	0	
=	Elhan Kastrati*	GK	2022–2025	3	0	
=	Mario Dajsinani*	GK	2022–2025	3	0	
=	Alen Sherri*	GK	2022–2026	3	0	
=	Cristian Shpendi*	FW	2025–2026	3	0	
304	Hivzi Sakiqi	MF	1947	2	0	
=	Muharrem Karanxha	FW	1950	2	0	
=	Miço Ndini	FW	1957–1958	2	1	
=	Qamil Alluni	MF	1957–1958	2	0	
=	Gani Merja	DF	1957–1958	2	0	
=	Shefqet Topi	GK	1957–1963	2	0	
=	Foto Andoni	FW	1965–1967	2	0	
=	Frederik Jorgaqi	DF	1967	2	0	
=	Maksut Leshteni	FW	1971	2	0	
=	Vladimir Balluku	DF	1971–1972	2	0	
=	Naim Allaj	MF	1973	2	0	
=	Shyqyri Ballgjini	FW	1981	2	0	
=	Aleko Bregu	DF	1980–1982	2	0	
=	Ilir Luarasi	GK	1981–1982	2	0	
=	Pandeli Xhaho	MF	1983	2	0	
=	Arben Vila	MF	1984–1985	2	0	
=	Artur Lekbello	GK	1987	2	0	
=	Lorenc Leskaj	DF	1990	2	0	
=	Anesti Arapi	GK	1990	2	0	
=	Dashnor Dume	MF	1991	2	0	
=	Shyqyri Shala	MF	1993	2	0	
=	Besnik Prenga	FW	1992–1994	2	0	
=	Edi Martini	MF	1994–1995	2	0	
=	Auron Miloti	FW	1995	2	0	
=	Elton Koça	FW	1995–1996	2	0	
=	Bajram Fraholli	MF	1996	2	1	
=	Amarildo Zela	MF	1992–1997	2	0	
=	Artan Vila	DF	1996–1997	2	0	
=	Bledar Devolli	MF	2000	2	0	(Malta) 2000 Rothmans
=	Altin Rrica	MF	2000	2	0	(Malta) 2000 Rothmans
=	Ilir Dibra	DF	2000	2	0	(Malta) 2000 Rothmans
=	Çlirim Basha	DF	2000	2	0	(Malta) 2000 Rothmans
=	Eldorado Merkoçi	MF	1999–2001	2	0	
=	Klevis Dalipi	FW	2002	2	0	(Malta) 2000 Rothmans
=	Ogert Muka	MF	2002	2	0	
=	Luan Zmijani	DF	2002	2	0	
=	Julian Ahmataj	MF	2002–2003	2	0	
=	Bledar Mancaku	FW	2002–2003	2	0	
=	Efstrat Billa	GK	2003	2	0	
=	Henri Ndreka	DF	2004	2	0	
=	Bekim Kastrati	MF	2006	2	0	
=	Jetmir Sefa	MF	2009	2	0	
=	Emiliano Veliaj	MF	2010–2012	2	0	
=	Jurgen Gjasula	MF	2013	2	0	
=	Fidan Aliti^{KOS}	MF	2014	2	0	
=	Amir Rrahmani^{KOS}	DF	2014–2015	2^{#1}	1	
=	Milot Rashica^{KOS}	MF	2016	2	0	
=	Valon Ahmedi*	FW	2017	2	0	
=	Bujar Lika*	DF	2018	2	0	
=	Sindrit Guri*	FW	2018	2	0	
=	Herdi Prenga*	DF	2018	2	0	
=	Kristal Abazaj*	FW	2018–2022	2	0	
=	Marsel Ismailgeci*	DF	2020–2022	2	0	
=	Erdenis Gurishta*	DF	2022	2	0	
=	Rudolf Turkaj*	DF	2022	2	0	
=	Redon Xhixha*	FW	2022	2	0	
=	Stivian Janku*	DF	2022	2	0	
=	Esin Hakaj*	DF	2022	2	0	
=	Arinaldo Rrapaj*	MF	2022	2	0	
=	Tedi Cara*	FW	2022	2	0	
=	Stavro Pilo*	DF	2026	2	0	
=	Bujar Pllana*	DF	2026	2	0	
368	Xhelal Juka	FW	1946	1	2	1946 Balkan Cup
=	Ruzhdi Bizhuta	MF	1946	1	1	1946 Balkan Cup
=	Foto Janku	DF	1946	1	0	1946 Balkan Cup
=	Prenge Gjeloshi	MF	1946	1	0	1946 Balkan Cup
=	Xhavit Demneri	DF	1946	1	0	1946 Balkan Cup
=	Zyhdi Barbullushi	MF	1947	1	0	
=	Fadil Vogli	DF	1952	1	0	
=	Isuf Pelingu	MF	1952	1	0	
=	Leonidha Dashi	DF	1953	1	0	
=	Dhimitër Qoshja	GK	1957	1	0	
=	Shyqyri Rreli	FW	1957	1	0	
=	Enver Shehu	MF	1957	1	0	
=	Eqerem Tallushi	MF	1957	1	0	
=	Abdulla Duma	MF	1958	1	0	
=	Dhimitraq Gjyli	MF	1958	1	0	
=	Miço Papadhopulli	DF	1963	1	0	
=	Andon Zaho	MF	1963	1	0	
=	Enver Ibërshimi	FW	1963	1	0	
=	Sotir Seferaj	FW	1964	1	0	
=	Bashkim Rudi	FW	1965	1	0	
=	Skënder Hyka	FW	1967	1	0	
=	Frederik Gjinali	DF	1967	1	0	
=	Agim Janku	FW	1971	1	0	
=	Dhori Kalluçi	MF	1973	1	0	
=	Spiko Çuri	FW	1973	1	0	
=	Fatmir Ismaili	GK	1973	1	0	
=	Ahmet Ahmedani	DF	1976	1	0	
=	Antonin Naçi	MF	1976	1	0	
=	Uran Xhafa	FW	1981	1	0	
=	Luan Seiti	FW	1981	1	0	
=	Ardan Popa	FW	1981	1	0	
=	Sulejman Mema	MF	1983	1	0	
=	Milutin Kërçiç	FW	1983	1	0	
=	Genc Tomorri	FD	1983	1	1	
=	Hasan Lika	MF	1983	1	0	
=	Kristaq Mile	MF	1985	1	0	
=	Besnik Bilali	DF	1987	1	0	
=	Krenar Alimehmeti	MF	1988	1	0	
=	Anesti Stoja	MF	1988	1	0	
=	Muharrem Dosti	GK	1989	1	0	
=	Fatmir Hasanpapa	MF	1989	1	0	
=	Naum Kove	DF	1990	1	0	
=	Ardian Sukaj	MF	1990	1	0	
=	Agim Canaj	DF	1991	1	0	
=	Josif Gjergji	DF	1991	1	0	
=	Blendi Sokoli	MF	1992	1	0	
=	Ferdinand Bilali	MF	1992	1	0	
=	Ramiz Bisha	MF	1992	1	0	
=	Shpëtim Kapidani	MF	1993	1	0	
=	Ardian Dashi	MF	1994	1	0	
=	Gentian Stojku	MF	1994	1	0	
=	Romeo Haxhiaj	MF	1994	1	0	
=	Nordik Ruhi	DF	1995	1	0	
=	Gentjan Çoçja	MF	1995	1	0	
=	Neritan Novi	MF	1995	1	0	
=	Ardian Behari	DF	1996	1	0	
=	Artan Mërgjyshi	DF	1996	1	0	
=	Dritan Baholli	DF	1996	1	0	
=	Skerdi Bejzade	FW	1998	1	0	
=	Oltion Osmani	DF	1998	1	0	
=	Artur Maxhuni	FW	1998	1	0	
=	Artion Poçi	MF	2001	1	0	
=	Julian Gjeloshi	GK	2002	1	0	
=	Dritan Babamusta	MF	2002	1	0	
=	Arjan Sheta	DF	2002	1	0	
=	Fjodor Xhafa	FW	2002	1	0	
=	Arjan Pisha	DF	2003	1	0	
=	Daniel Xhafaj	FW	2007	1	0	
=	Xhevahir Sukaj	FW	2008	1	0	
=	Migen Memelli	FW	2009	1	0	
=	Ervin Llani	GK	2010	1	0	
=	Ditmar Bicaj	DF	2010	1	0	
=	Parid Xhihani	MF	2010	1	0	
=	Igli Allmuça	MF	2011	1	0	
=	Agonit Sallaj	DF	2011	1	0	
=	Mërgim Brahimi^{SUI-21}	MF	2012	1	0	
=	Vullnet Basha	MF	2013	1	0	
=	Albi Dosti	MF	2014	1	0	
=	Arbnor Fejzullahu	DF	2015	1	0	
=	Albi Alla*	DF	2017	1	0	
=	Astrit Ajdarević	MF	2017	1	0	
=	Ramën Çepele*	DF	2020	1	0	
=	Jon Mersinaj*	DF	2022	1	0	
=	Albion Marku*	DF	2022	1	0	
=	Ardit Deliu*	MF	2022	1	0	
=	Esat Mala*	MF	2022	1	0	
=	Ardit Toli*	MF	2022	1	0	
=	Lorenco Vila*	FW	2022	1	0	
=	Serxho Ujka*	MF	2022	1	0	
=	Herald Marku*	MF	2022	1	0	
=	Marvin Çuni*	MF	2023	1	0	
=	Sebastjan Spahiu*	MF	2024	1	0	
=	Maldini Kacurri*	DF	2025	1	0	
=	Simon Simoni*	GK	2025	1	0	
=	Klisman Cake*	DF	2025	1	0	
=	Nazmi Gripshi*	MF	2025	1	0	
=	Luis Hasa*	MF	2026	1	0	

- ^{KOS} = Withdrew to play for Kosovo.
- ^{SUI} = Withdrew to play for Switzerland.
- ^{SUI-21} = Withdrew to play for Switzerland U21.

== See also ==
- List of Albania international footballers (1–24 caps)
- List of Albania international footballers born outside Albania
