= List of Albania international footballers (1–24 caps) =

The List of Albania international footballers includes all the individual players who made between 1 and 24 appearances for Albania in the qualifiers of the UEFA European Football Championship, the FIFA World Cup, friendly matches as well as its participation in the Balkan Cup and in the Malta (Rothmans) International Tournament, from 1946 to the present.

== Players ==
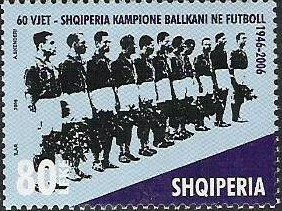
Stamps of Albania, 2006. 60th Anniversary of Victory at the Balkan Cup

Below is a full-list of the players who have made between 1 and 24 appearances for Albania, as of 11 June 2016 after the match against Israel.

Players that are still active
Part of the squad that won the 1946 Balkan Cup
Part of the squad that won the 2000 Rothmans International Tournament

Rank	Position	Name	Career	Caps	Goals
55
55	FW	Loro Boriçi	1946–1958	24	6
55	MF	Ledian Memushaj	2010–	24	1
57	GK	Perlat Musta	1981–1993	23	0
57	MF	Gjergji Muzaka	2008–2013	23	1
59	DF	Muhedin Targaj	1980–1985	22	3
59	FW	Agustin Kola	1980–1994	22	1
61	DF	Safet Berisha	1970–1981	21	0
61	MF	Skënder Hodja	1984–1990	21	0
61	FW	Bekim Balaj	2012–	21	4
64
64	DF	Muhamet Dibra	1946–1953	20	0
64	GK	Samir Ujkani^{KOS}	2008–2013	20	0
64	MF	Lefter Millo	1988–1996	20	0
64	FW	Ramazan Rragami	1965–1973	20	1
64	DF	Rexhep Spahiu	1946–1952	20	0
69
69	MF	Sllave Llambi	1946–1950	19	0
69	MF	Eduard Abazi	1985–1997	19	2
69	MF	Redi Jupi	1995–2006	19	0
69	DF	Admir Teli	2006–2013	19	0
69	MF	Gilman Lika	2008–2013	19	0
69	MF	Ergys Kaçe	2013–	19	2
75
75	MF	Aristidh Parapani	1946–1952	18	1
75	GK	Blendi Nallbani	1989–2002	18	0
75	MF	Salvador Kaçaj	1991–1997	18	1
75	MF	Taulant Xhaka	2014–	18	0
79
79	MF	Vasif Biçaku	1946–1950	17	1
79	FW	Fatmir Vata	1996–2002	17	0
79	GK	Isli Hidi	2005–2011	17	0
79	FW	Besart Berisha	2006–2009	17	1
79	MF	Shkëlzen Gashi	2013–	17	1
84	MF	Shkëlqim Muça	1982–1987	16	2
84	FW	Edmond Dalipi	1993–2000	16	1
84	FW	Edgar Çani	2012–	16	4
87	MF	Lin Shllaku	1963–1970	15	0
87	MF	Sabah Bizi	1967–1976	15	1
87	FW	Ilir Përnaska	1971–1981	15	5
87	MF	Haxhi Ballgjini	1976–1985	15	1
87	DF	Fatbardh Jera	1985–1990	15	0
87	DF	Saimir Malko	1994–1996	15	0
87	MF	Valdet Rama	2013–2015	15	3
94	DF	Xhevdet Shaqiri	1947–1957	14	0
94	MF	Ali Mema	1963–1967	14	0
94	MF	Ferid Rragami	1980–1985	14	0
94	MF	Bedri Omuri	1982–1987	14	3
94	GK	Ilion Lika	2002–2006	14	0
94	MF	Bledi Shkëmbi	2002–2006	14	0
94	DF	Arlind Ajeti	2014–	14	1
94	DF	Berat Djimsiti	2015–	14	1
102
102	FW	Qamil Teliti	1946–1952	13	6
102	DF	Bahri Kavaja	1946–1950	13	0
102	FW	Kliton Bozgo	1993–2003	13	0
102	MF	Mahir Halili	1996–1999	13	1
102	MF	Arjan Peço	1996–2002	13	0
102	MF	Sabien Lilaj	2011–2016	13	0
108	FW	Zihni Gjinali	1948–1952	12	3
108	DF	Fatbardh Deliallisi	1957–1965	12	0
108	DF	Fatmir Frashëri	1963–1970	12	0
108	DF	Mihal Gjika	1971–1974	12	1
108	DF	Ardit Beqiri	2002–2006	12	0
108	DF	Tefik Osmani	2005–2013	12	0
114
114	DF	Besim Fagu	1946–1958	11	0
114	GK	Qemal Vogli	1947–1953	11	0
114	DF	Skënder Halili	1963–1965	11	0
114	FW	Medin Zhega	1965–1971	11	3
114	MF	Faruk Sejdini	1971–1976	11	0
114	MF	Ilir Lame	1980–1984	11	0
114	DF	Adnan Oçelli	1984–1993	11	0
114	DF	Rrapo Taho	1986–1993	11	0
114	FW	Kastriot Peqini	1991–1994	11	0
114	MF	Mehmet Dragusha	2003–2005	11	1
114	DF	Endri Vrapi	2006–2011	11	0
125	DF	Arian Hametaj	1982–1985	10	0
125	DF	Skënder Gega	1987–1989	10	0
125	FW	Ylli Shehu	1988–1995	10	1
125	DF	Gjergji Dëma	1990–1997	10	0
125	MF	Arbën Milori	1991–1995	10	0
125	DF	Alpin Gallo	2002–2005	10	0
125	DF	Naser Aliji	2015–	10	0
132
132	FW	Pal Mirashi	1946–1950	9	4
132	GK	Mikel Janku	1964–1967	9	0
132	DF	Teodor Vaso	1967–1971	9	0
132	DF	Bujar Çani	1970–1972	9	0
132	FW	Sefedin Braho	1973–1983	9	1
132	MF	Alfred Ferko	1986–1992	9	0
132	MF	Ledio Pano	1987–1996	9	1
132	MF	Afrim Tole	1995–2000	9	0
140
140	GK	Giacomo Poselli	1946–1948	8	0
140	FW	Skënder Jareçi	1949–1958	8	1
140	DF	Gëzim Kasmi	1963–1971	8	0
140	MF	Iljaz Çeço	1964–1971	8	0
140	GK	Koço Dinella	1967–1973	8	0
140	DF	Rifat Ibërshimi	1971–1976	8	0
140	FW	Ferdinand Lleshi	1976–1981	8	0
140	DF	Petro Ruçi	1982–1983	8	0
140	MF	Luan Vukatana	1982–1983	8	0
140	MF	Ardian Mema	1995–1998	8	0
140	FW	Ahmed Januzi	2010–2013	8	0
140	DF	Frederic Veseli	2015–	8	0
152	FW	Robert Jashari	1963–1965	7	1
152	MF	Mehdi Bushati	1963–1965	7	0
152	GK	Bashkim Muhedini	1971–1973	7	0
152	DF	Millan Baçi	1976–1981	7	1
152	DF	Kreshnik Çipi	1980–1992	7	0
152	DF	Kastriot Hysi	1980–1981	7	0
152	FW	Ilir Kepa	1988–1993	7	1
152	MF	Artan Bano	1993–1996	7	0
152	MF	Sokol Prenga	1995–1997	7	0
152	GK	Orges Shehi	1998; 2010–	7	0
152	DF	Franc Veliu	2009–2013	7	0
152	MF	Alban Meha^{KOS}	2012–2015	7	2
164
164	MF	Bimo Fakja	1946–1948	6	0
164	DF	Besim Boriçi	1949–1950	6	0
164	FW	Refik Resmja	1952–1963	6	1
164	DF	Astrit Ziu	1970–1972	6	1
164	FW	Vasillaq Zëri	1976–1982	6	0
164	GK	Jani Kaçi	1976–1981	6	0
164	DF	Arjan Bimo	1982–1985	6	0
164	FW	Agim Bubeqi	1987–1989	6	0
164	GK	Halim Mersini	1988–1989	6	0
164	DF	Fatos Daja	1991–1997	6	0
164	MF	Alvaro Zalla	1993–1996	6	0
164	FW	Enkeleid Dobi	1995–2003	6	1
164	MF	Suad Liçi	2000–2005	6	0
164	MF	Dorian Bylykbashi	2006–2010	6	0
164	MF	Armando Vajushi	2011–2014	6	1
164	MF	Herolind Shala^{KOS}	2014–2016	6	0
180	MF	Sulejman Vathi	1947–1950	5	0
180	GK	Sulejman Maliqati	1950–1963	5	0
180	MF	Lorenç Vorfi	1963–1967	5	0
180	FW	Pavllo Bukoviku	1963–1965	5	0
180	DF	Perikli Dhales	1970–1971	5	0
180	MF	Andrea Marko	1980–1985	5	0
180	FW	Dashnor Bajaziti	1980–1983	5	0
180	FW	Roland Luçi	1981–1982	5	0
180	MF	Latif Gjondeda	1987–1992	5	0
180	MF	Adrian Barbullushi	1990–1992	5	0
180	DF	Zamir Shpuza	1991–1997	5	0
180	GK	Xhevahir Kapllani	1993–1996	5	0
180	DF	Luan Pinari	1998–2003	5	1
180	DF	Rezart Dabulla	1999–2003	5	0
180	MF	Albert Duro	1999–2000	5	0
180	DF	Elvis Sina	2002–2005	5	0
196	MF	Skënder Begeja	1947	4	0
196	FW	Hamdhi Bakalli	1950–1953	4	0
196	FW	Fiqiri Duro (Thoma)	1963–1965	4	0
196	DF	Gani Xhafa	1967–1973	4	0
196	GK	Jani Rama	1967–1973	4	0
196	MF	Milto Gurma	1972–1976	4	0
196	DF	Kristaq Eksarko	1983–1984	4	0
196	GK	Sotir Shkurti	1987–1990	4	0
196	DF	Roland Iljadhi	1987–1990	4	0
196	MF	Ermal Tahiri	1990–1991	4	0
196	DF	Eqerem Memushi	1990–1991	4	0
196	FW	Edmond Dosti	1991–1995	4	0
196	DF	Përparim Daiu	1995–1998	4	0
196	FW	Roland Zajmi	1995–2000	4	1
196	FW	Viktor Paço	1996–1997	4	0
196	GK	Armir Grimaj	1998–2000	4	0
196	MF	Johan Driza	1998–2000	4	0
196	FW	Vioresin Sinani	2000–2002	4	1
196	DF	Renato Arapi	2011–2015	4	0
196	MF	Hair Zeqiri	2012	4	0
196	GK	Thomas Strakosha	2016–	4	0
217
217	GK	Dodë Tahiri	1946	3	0
217	GK	Alfred Bonati	1947–1950	3	0
217	FW	Rexhep Lacej	1949–1950	3	0
217	MF	Sabri Peqini	1950–1952	3	0
217	DF	Muhamet Vila	1952–1953	3	0
217	FW	Simon Dëda	1953–1958	3	0
217	FW	Koleç Kraja	1957–1963	3	2
217	FW	Bahri Ishka	1964–1967	3	0
217	FW	Mexhit Haxhiu	1964–1965	3	1
217	FW	Niko Xhaçka	1965–1967	3	0
217	MF	Josif Kazanxhi	1967	3	0
217	MF	Mehmet Xhafa	1972–1973	3	0
217	FW	Agim Murati	1973–1976	3	0
217	MF	Millan Vaso	1973	3	0
217	FW	Ismet Hoxha	1973	3	0
217	DF	Kujtim Çoçoli	1981	3	0
217	MF	Alfred Zijai	1986–1987	3	0
217	DF	Arjan Stafa	1989–1990	3	0
217	FW	Kujtim Majaçi	1989–1990	3	0
217	DF	Pjerin Noga	1989–1990	3	0
217	FW	Arben Arbëri	1989–1990	3	0
217	DF	Genc Ibro	1990	3	0
217	DF	Artan Pali	1992–1995	3	0
217	MF	Aleksandër Vasi	1992	3	0
217	GK	Avenir Dani	1992	3	0
217	MF	Anesti Qendro	1992–1995	3	1
217	DF	Ilir Alliu	1995–1996	3	0
217	MF	Ervin Lamce	1995–1997	3	0
217	MF	Uliks Kotri	1998	3	0
217	MF	Paulin Dhëmbi	2002	3	0
217	DF	Lulzim Hushi	2002	3	0
217	DF	Erjon Xhafa	2006–2007	3	0
217	DF	Blerim Rrustemi	2007	3	0
217	FW	Agon Mehmeti	2013	3	0
217	MF	Azdren Llullaku	2013–	3	0
217	GK	Alban Hoxha	2014–	3	0
217	FW	Rey Manaj	2015–	3	1
217	MF	Liridon Latifi	2016–	3	0
255	MF	Hivzi Sakiqi	1947	2	0
255	FW	Muharrem Karanxha	1950	2	0
255	GK	Shefqet Topi	1957–1963	2	0
255	MF	Miço Ndini	1957–1958	2	1
255	DF	Gani Merja	1957–1958	2	0
255	MF	Qamil Alluni	1957–1958	2	0
255	FW	Foto Andoni	1965–1967	2	0
255	DF	Frederik Jorgaqi	1965–1967	2	0
255	FW	Maksut Leshteni	1971	2	0
255	DF	Vladimir Balluku	1971–1972	2	0
255	MF	Naim Allaj	1973	2	0
255	DF	Aleko Bregu	1980–1982	2	0
255	FW	Shyqyri Ballgjini	1980–1982	2	0
255	GK	Ilir Luarasi	1981–1982	2	0
255	MF	Pandeli Xhaho	1983	2	0
255	MF	Arben Vila	1984–1985	2	0
255	GK	Artur Lekbello	1987	2	0
255	DF	Lorenc Leskaj	1990	2	0
255	FW	Eduard Kaçaçi	1990	2	0
255	GK	Anesti Arapi	1990	2	0
255	MF	Dashnor Dume	1990	2	0
255	FW	Besnik Prenga	1992–1994	2	0
255	MF	Amarildo Zela	1992–1997	2	0
255	DF	Shyqyri Shala	1993	2	0
255	MF	Edi Martini	1994–1995	2	0
255	FW	Auron Miloti	1995	2	0
255	FW	Elton Koça	1995–1996	2	0
255	DF	Artan Vila	1996–1997	2	0
255	MF	Bajram Fraholli	1996	2	1
255	MF	Eldorado Merkoçi	1999–2001	2	0
255	MF	Altin Rrica	2000	2	0
255	MF	Bledar Devolli	2000	2	0
255	DF	Ilir Dibra	2000	2	0
255	DF	Çlirim Basha	2000	2	0
255	DF	Luan Zmijani	2000	2	0
255	FW	Klevis Dalipi	2002	2	0
255	MF	Ogert Muka	2002	2	0
255	FW	Bledar Mancaku	2002–2003	2	0
255	MF	Julian Ahmataj	2002–2003	2	0
255	GK	Estref Billa	2003	2	0
255	DF	Henri Ndreka	2004	2	0
255	FW	Bekim Kastrati	2006	2	0
255	MF	Jetmir Sefa	2009	2	0
255	MF	Emiljano Veliaj	2010–2012	2	0
255	MF	Jurgen Gjasula	2013	2	0
255	DF	Amir Rrahmani^{KOS}	2014–2016	2	1
255	DF	Fidan Aliti^{KOS}	2014	2	0
255	MF	Milot Rashica^{KOS}	2016	2	0
255	MF	Eros Grezda	2016–	2	0
302
302	FW	Xhelal Juka	1946	1	2
302	DF	Xhavit Demneri	1946	1	0
302	MF	Ruzhdi Bizhuta	1946	1	1
302	DF	Foto Janku	1946	1	0
302	MF	Prenge Gjeloshi	1946	1	0
302	MF	Zyhdi Barbullushi	1947	1	0
302	DF	Fadil Vogli	1952	1	0
302	MF	Isuf Pelingu	1952	1	0
302	DF	Leonidha Dashi	1953	1	0
302	MF	Eqerem Tallushi	1957	1	0
302	GK	Dhimiter Qoshja	1957	1	0
302	MF	Enver Shehu	1957	1	0
302	FW	Shyqyri Rreli	1957	1	0
302	MF	Abdulla Duma	1958	1	0
302	MF	Dhimitraq Gjyli	1958	1	0
302	DF	Miço Papadophulli	1963	1	0
302	FW	Enver Ibërshimi	1963	1	0
302	MF	Andon Zaho	1963	1	0
302	FW	Sotir Seferaj	1964	1	0
302	FW	Bashkim Rudi	1965	1	0
302	FW	Skënder Hyka	1967	1	0
302	DF	Frederik Gjinali	1967	1	0
302	FW	Agim Janku	1971	1	0
302	MF	Dhori Kalluçi	1973	1	0
302	FW	Spiko Çuri	1973	1	0
302	GK	Fatmir Ismaili	1973	1	0
302	MF	Antonin Naçi	1976	1	0
302	DF	Ahmet Ahmedani	1976	1	0
302	FW	Uran Xhafa	1981	1	0
302	FW	Luan Seiti	1981	1	0
302	FW	Ardan Popa	1981	1	0
302	MF	Sulejman Mema	1983	1	0
302	FW	Milutin Kërçiç	1983	1	0
302	DF	Genc Tomorri	1983	1	1
302	MF	Hasan Lika	1983	1	0
302	MF	Kristaq Mile	1985	1	0
302	DF	Besnik Bilali	1985	1	0
302	MF	Krenar Alimehmeti	1988	1	0
302	MF	Anesti Stoja	1988	1	0
302	GK	Muharrem Dosti	1989	1	0
302	MF	Fatmir Hasanpapa	1989	1	0
302	DF	Naum Kove	1990	1	0
302	MF	Ardian Sukaj	1990	1	0
302	DF	Agim Canaj	1991	1	0
302	DF	Josif Gjergji	1991	1	0
302	MF	Blendi Sokoli	1992	1	0
302	MF	Ferdinand Bilali	1992	1	0
302	MF	Ramiz Bisha	1992	1	0
302	MF	Shpëtim Kapidani	1993	1	0
302	DF	Ardian Dashi	1994	1	0
302	MF	Romeo Haxhiaj	1994	1	0
302	DF	Gentian Stojku	1994	1	0
302	MF	Neritan Novi	1995	1	0
302	DF	Nordik Ruhi	1995	1	0
302	MF	Gentjan Çoçja	1995	1	0
302	DF	Artan Mergjyshi	1996	1	0
302	DF	Ardian Behari	1996	1	0
302	FW	Dashnor Kastrioti	1996	1	0
302	DF	Dritan Baholli	1996	1	0
302	DF	Oltion Osmani	1998	1	0
302	FW	Artur Maxhuni	1998	1	0
302	MF	Artion Poçi	2001	1	0
302	GK	Julian Gjeloshi	2002	1	0
302	DF	Arjan Sheta	2002	1	0
302	MF	Dritan Babamusta	2002	1	0
302	FW	Fjodor Xhafa	2002	1	0
302	DF	Arjan Pisha	2003	1	0
302	FW	Daniel Xhafaj	2007	1	0
302	FW	Xhevahir Sukaj	2008	1	0
302	FW	Migen Memelli	2009	1	0
302	MF	Parid Xhihani	2010	1	0
302	DF	Ditmar Bicaj	2010	1	0
302	GK	Ervin Llani	2010	1	0
302	MF	Igli Allmuça	2011	1	0
302	DF	Agonit Sallaj	2011	1	0
302	MF	Mërgim Brahimi^{SUI}	2012	1	0
302	MF	Vullnet Basha	2013	1	0
302	DF	Kristi Qose	2014	1	0
302	MF	Albi Dosti	2014	1	0
302	DF	Arbnor Fejzullahu	2015	1	0
302	DF	Albi Alla	2017–	1	0
