= Gjinali =

Gjinali is an Albanian surname. Notable people with the surname include:

- Frederik Gjinali (born 1942), Albanian footballer
- Zihni Gjinali (1926–2005), Albanian footballer
