= Kujtim =

Kujtim is an Albanian masculine given name with the meaning "memory, remembrance" in Albanian. The feminine variant of the name is Kujtime. Notable people with the name include:

- Kujtim Bala (born 1990), Swedish football player of Kosovar descent
- Kujtim Çashku (born 1950), Albanian film director and screenwriter
- Kujtim Çoçoli (born 1952), Albanian football player
- Kujtim Gjonaj (1946–2021), Albanian screenwriter and film director
- Kujtime Kurbogaj (born 1996), Swedish-born Albanian football player
- Kujtim Majaci (1962–2009), Albanian football player
- Kujtim Shala (born 1964), Croatian football player of Kosovo Albanian descent

== See also ==
- Kujtim Fejzulai, perpetrator at the 2020 Vienna attack
