= Balluku =

Balluku is a surname. Notable people with the surname include:

- Belinda Balluku (born 1973), Albanian politician
- Beqir Balluku (1917–1975), Albanian politician
- Vladimir Balluku (born 1951), Albanian footballer
