= Artur Lekbello =

Artur Lekbello may refer to:

- Artur Lekbello (footballer, born 1958), Albanian footballer
- Artur Lekbello (footballer, born 1966), Albanian footballer
