= Ilir Dibra =

Albanian retired footballer

Personal information
- Full name: Ilir Dibra
- Date of birth: 16 August 1977 (age 49)
- Place of birth: Albania
- Position: Defender

Senior career*
Years	Team	Apps	(Gls)
1994–2000	Vllaznia	109	(3)
2000–2001	Bylis	22	(2)
2001–2003	Vllaznia	51	(3)
2004	Apolonia		
2005	Flamurtari		
2005	Lushnja	12	(0)
2006	Teuta	7	(0)
2006–2007	Luftëtari	24	(0)
2007–2008	Vllaznia	2	(0)
2008–2009	Bylis	0	(0)

International career
2000	Albania	2	(0)
- * Club domestic league appearances and goals as of 24 November 2009

Ilir Dibra (born 16 August 1977) is an Albanian retired footballer who won a league title with Vllaznia Shkodër.

== International career ==
He made his debut for Albania in a February 2000 Malta International Football Tournament match against Azerbaijan and earned a total of 2 caps, scoring no goals. His final international was in the same month at the same tournament against Malta.

== Honours ==
- Albanian Superliga: 1

1998
