= Gëzim Kasmi =

Albanian footballer

Personal information
- Full name: Gëzim Kasmi
- Date of birth: 25 July 1942
- Place of birth: Tirana, Albania
- Date of death: 17 October 2016 (aged 74)
- Place of death: Tirana, Albania
- Position: Left back

Youth career
- 17 Nëntori

Senior career*
Years	Team	Apps	(Gls)
1960–1966	17 Nëntori		
1967–1968	5 Shtatori		
1968–1972	17 Nëntori		

International career
1963–1971	Albania	8	(0)
Medal record
Dacia Unirea Brăila
Runner-up	Romanian Cup	1993
- * Club domestic league appearances and goals

Gëzim Kasmi (25 July 1942 – 17 October 2016) was an Albanian footballer who played for 17 Nëntori Tirana (present day KF Tirana) and the Albania national team.

== International career ==
He made his debut for Albania in a June 1963 Olympic Games qualification match against Bulgaria and earned a total of 8 caps, scoring no goals. His final international was a May 1971 Olympic Games qualification match against Romania.

== Honours ==
- Albanian Superliga: 4

1965, 1966, 1968, 1970
