= Ilir Kepa =

Albanian footballer

Personal information
- Date of birth: 21 April 1966 (age 60)
- Place of birth: Shkodër, Albania
- Height: 1.80 m (5 ft 11 in)
- Position: Striker

Senior career*
Years	Team	Apps	(Gls)
1987–1991	Vllaznia Shkodër		
1991–1994	RWDM	41	(8)
1994–1996	Louhans-Cuiseaux	24	(14)
1996–1998	Olympic Charleroi	51	

International career
1988–1993	Albania	7	(1)

Managerial career
- 2007: RWDM47
- * Club domestic league appearances and goals

Ilir Kepa (born 21 April 1966 in Shkodër) is an Albanian retired football striker who played for the Albania national team.

== Playing career ==
=== Club ===
Kepa played for Vllaznia Shkodër but fled communist Albania on 30 March 1991 alongside six other internationals (among them Rudi Vata), when the left the national team's hotel in Paris right after the European Championship qualification match against France. He ended up in Belgium and joined Hugo Broos' RWDM and stayed for three years. He then had a couple of seasons at French third tier with Louhans-Cuiseaux, before returning to Belgium and finish his career at Olympic Charleroi, for whom he played 51 matches.

=== International ===
He made his debut for Albania in a September 1988 friendly match away to Romania and earned a total of 7 caps, scoring 1 goal. His final international was a September 1993 FIFA World Cup qualification match against Spain.

== Managerial career ==
Kepa was appointed coach of reformed RWDM47 in 2007. In 2009 he took charge of the Ganshoren reserves team.
