= Johan Driza =

Albanian footballer

Personal information
- Date of birth: 20 August 1976 (age 50)
- Place of birth: Vlorë, Albania
- Position: Defender

Senior career*
| Years | Team | Apps | (Gls) |
| 1992–1998 | Flamurtari | 111 | (3) |
| 1998 | Wacker Burghausen | 15 | (1) |
| 1999 | Flamurtari | 11 | (0) |
| 1999–2000 | Tirana | 25 | (0) |
| 2000–2001 | Flamurtari | 11 | (0) |
| 2000–2001 | Bylis | 35 | (1) |
| 2001–2003 | Dinamo Tirana | 5 | (0) |
| 2003–2004 | Teuta | 32 | (0) |
| 2004–2007 | Flamurtari | 26 | (0) |
| 2007–2009 | Bylis | 12 | (0) |
| Total | | 283 | (5) |

International career
| 1997 | Albania U21 | 5 | (0) |
| 1998–2000 | Albania | 4 | (0) |
- * Club domestic league appearances and goals

Johan Driza (born 20 August 1976) is an Albanian retired professional footballer who played for Flamurtari Vlorë, Wacker Burghausen, KF Tirana, Bylis Ballsh, Dinamo Tirana and Teuta Durrës as well as the Albania national team.

== International career ==
He made his debut for Albania in an August 1998 friendly match away against Cyrus and earned a total of four caps, scoring no goals. His final international was a February 2000 Malta International Football Tournament match against tournament hosts Malta.

== Honours ==
- Kategoria Superiore: 2000, 2002
