= Josif Kazanxhi =

Albanian footballer

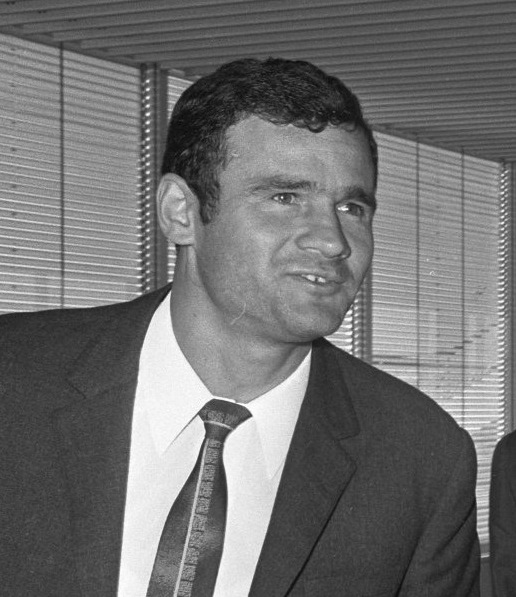

Personal information
- Full name: Josif Kazanxhi-Xuxi
- Date of birth: 13 June 1943
- Place of birth: Tirana, Albania
- Date of death: 9 November 2012 (aged 69)
- Place of death: Milan, Italy
- Position: Midfielder

Youth career
- 1959–1962: 17 Nëntori Tirana

Senior career*
Years	Team	Apps	(Gls)
1962	17 Nëntori Tirana		
1962–1965	Partizani		
1965–1972	17 Nëntori Tirana		

International career
1967	Albania	3	(0)
- * Club domestic league appearances and goals

Josif Kazanxhi-Xuxi (13 June 1943 – 9 November 2012) was an Albanian footballer who played for Partizani Tirana, 17 Nëntori Tirana and the Albania national team in a career that lasted ten years between 1962 and 1972.

== International career ==
He made his debut for Albania in an April 1967 European Championship qualification match away against West Germany and earned a total of 3 caps, scoring no goals. His final international was the home leg of the same Euro qualifying tournament against West Germany.

== Honours ==
- Albanian Superliga: 3

1966, 1968, 1970
