= Shyqyri Shala =

Albanian footballer

Personal information
- Date of birth: 5 July 1965 (age 61)
- Place of birth: Kavajë, Albania
- Position: Defender

Senior career*
Years	Team	Apps	(Gls)
1986-1993	Besa	62+	(6+)

International career
1993	Albania	2	(0)
- * Club domestic league appearances and goals

Shyqyri Shala (born 5 July 1965) is a retired Albanian footballer who played as a defender for Besa Kavajë in the Albanian Superliga. He was capped 2 times with the Albania national football team.

== International career ==
He made his debut for Albania in a May 1993 FIFA World Cup qualification match against Latvia and earned a total of 2 caps, scoring no goals. His other international game was another World Cup qualification match, 11 days after his first, against the Republic of Ireland.

== Personal life ==
Shala was a cousin of Apolonia legend Kujtim Majaci.
