= Altin Rrica =

Albanian footballer

Personal information
- Full name: Altin Rrica
- Date of birth: 13 December 1973 (age 52)
- Place of birth: Kavajë, Albania
- Position: Midfielder

Senior career*
Years	Team	Apps	(Gls)
1992–1997	Besa	83	(8)
1997	Tirana	10	(0)
1998-1999	Besa	23	(2)
1999	Partizani	25	(3)
2000	Shqiponja	7	(0)
Total		148	(13)

International career
- Albania U-21
2000	Albania	2	(0)
- * Club domestic league appearances and goals

Altin Rrica (born 13 December 1973) is an Albanian retired footballer who played for Besa Kavajë, KF Tirana, Partizani Tirana and Shqiponja Gjirokastër as well as the Albania national team.

== Club career ==
=== Career ending accident ===
His career came to an abrupt end at the age of 27 on 22 July 2000 following an accident sustained by the rocks at Lake Ohrid which left him permanently disabled from the waist down. While in pre-season with Shqiponja Gjirokastër, Rrica jumped into the lake and crushed into the rocks knocking him unconscious.

== International career ==
He made his debut for Albania in a February 2000 Rothmans International Tournament match against Andorra and earned his second and final cap during the same tournament against hosts Malta.
