= Skënder Hyka =

Albanian footballer

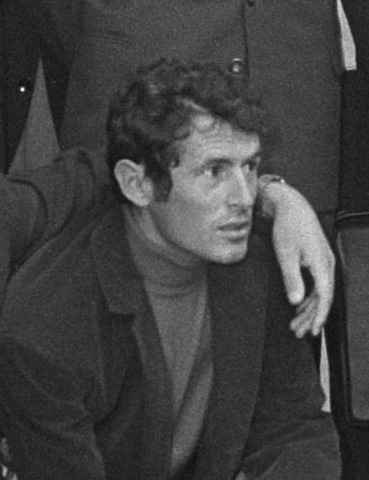

Personal information
- Full name: Skënder Hyka
- Date of birth: 6 September 1944
- Place of birth: Tirana, Albania
- Date of death: 5 July 2018 (aged 73)
- Position: Forward

Youth career
- 1957–1963: 17 Nëntori Tirana

Senior career*
Years	Team	Apps	(Gls)
1963–1974	17 Nëntori Tirana		(60)
Total			(60)

International career
1967	Albania	1	(0)
- * Club domestic league appearances and goals

Skender Hyka (6 September 1944 – 5 July 2018) was an Albanian footballer who spent his entire career at his hometown club 17 Nëntori Tirana (present day KF Tirana) as a forward. He also represented the Albania national team, although he only earned one senior cap at international level. He worked for Albanian Football Association as an executive committee member and he was head of the Competition Commission since 2009.

== Career ==
=== Early career ===
Hyka was born and raised in Tirana, where he went attended high school as well as university. He studied at the Institute of Physical Culture and Sport and graduated in 1968, whilst still playing professional football. He joined the 17 Nëntori Tirana youth setup at the age of 13 in 1957, where he played for the different age groups before being promoted to the first team in the early 1960s.

=== 17 Nëntori Tirana ===
Once turning professional Hyka quickly established himself as a key member of the 17 Nëntori Tirana team, helping them win the Kategoria Superiore four times during his career. He scored 60 league goals with 17 Nëntori which at the time of his retirement in 1974 made him the club's all-time top goalscorer (5th as of 2012). He played in around 400 games.

== International career ==
Despite a successful club career with 17 Nëntori, Hyka never managed to break through into the Albania national team. This was due to the high competition for a place in the attacking positions, especially with the likes of Medin Zhega and Panajot Pano playing in the same time period as Hyka, limiting his chances of being able to play international football. His only senior appearance came on 8 April 1967 against West Germany in Dortmund, a game which Albania lost 6-0 thanks to four goals by Gerd Müller and a double by Hannes Löhr. Hyka would not represent Albania again after this game as this was his only international cap.

== Albanian FA ==
In the years 1992 - 1995, has been Secretary of the Athletic Club Zanzibar. In 1997 has been Secretary General of the Albanian FA. From 1992 onwards, a member of the executive committee of the Albanian FA.

== Personal life ==
Hyka's son Endi also won two league titles playing for Tirana in the 1990s and his cousin Renisi did the same in 1989. Skënder Hyka died in July 2018.

== Honours ==
- Albanian Superliga: 3

1966, 1968, 1970
