= Roland Luçi =

Albanian footballer

Personal information
- Date of birth: 24 February 1960 (age 66)

International career
Years	Team	Apps	(Gls)
1981–1982	Albania	5	(0)

Roland Luçi (born 24 February 1960) is an Albanian footballer. He played in five matches for the Albania national football team from 1981 to 1982.
