= Ardian Popa =

Albanian footballer

Personal information
- Date of birth: 15 April 1962 (age 64)

International career
Years	Team	Apps	(Gls)
1981	Albania	1	(0)

Ardian Popa (born 15 April 1962) is an Albanian footballer. He played in one match for the Albania national football team in 1981.
