= Uran Xhafa =

Albanian footballer

Personal information
- Date of birth: 1951 (age 74–75)

International career
Years	Team	Apps	(Gls)
1973–1981	Albania	3	(0)

Uran Xhafa (born 1951) is an Albanian former footballer. He played in three matches for the Albania national football team from 1973 to 1981.
