= Enver Ibërshimi =

Albanian footballer

Personal information
- Full name: Enver Ibërshimi
- Date of birth: 30 November 1939 (age 86)
- Place of birth: Elbasan, Albania
- Position: Striker

Senior career*
Years	Team	Apps	(Gls)
1960–1973	Labinoti		(92)

International career
1971–1972	Albania U23	5	(0)
1963	Albania	1	(0)
- * Club domestic league appearances and goals

Enver Ibërshimi (born 30 November 1939 in Elbasan) is an Albanian retired football player who was a one club man, having spent the entirely of his career with Labinoti Elbasan between 1960 and 1973. He scored 92 league goals for the club throughout his career, making him the current 17th top goalscorer in Albanian history.

== International career ==
He made his debut for Albania in an October 1963 European Championship qualification match against Denmark in Tirana, it proved to be his sole international match.
