= Anesti Stoja =

Albanian footballer

Personal information
- Date of birth: 24 June 1963 (age 63)
- Position: Midfielder

Senior career*
Years	Team	Apps	(Gls)
1984–1995	KF Tirana		

International career
1988	Albania	1	(0)
- * Club domestic league appearances and goals

Anesti Stoja (born 24 June 1963) is a retired Albanian football midfielder.

== International career ==
He made his debut for Albania in an October 1988 FIFA World Cup qualification match against Poland, coming on as a second-half substitute for Ylli Shehu. It proved to be his only international game.

== Honours ==
- Albanian Superliga: 4

1985, 1988, 1989, 1995
