= Nordik Ruhi =

Albanian footballer

Personal information
- Date of birth: 24 August 1970 (age 56)
- Position: Defender

Senior career*
Years	Team	Apps	(Gls)
1990–1992	Dinamo Tirana		
1992–1995	FK Partizani Tirana		
1995–2000	KF Tirana		

International career
1995	Albania	1	(0)
- * Club domestic league appearances and goals

Nordik Ruhi (born 24 August 1970) is an Albanian former footballer who played as a defender. He made one appearance for the Albania national team in 1995.
