= Kastriot Hysi =

Albanian footballer (born 1958)

Personal information
- Date of birth: 26 February 1958 (age 68)

International career
Years	Team	Apps	(Gls)
1980–1981	Albania	7	(0)

Kastriot Hysi (born 26 February 1958) is an Albanian footballer. He played in seven matches for the Albania national football team from 1980 to 1981.
