= Arbën Milori =

Albanian footballer

Personal information
- Full name: Arbën Milori
- Date of birth: 22 November 1969 (age 56)
- Place of birth: Albania
- Height: 1.83 m (6 ft 0 in)
- Position: Midfielder

Youth career
- –1989: Dinamo Tirana

Senior career*
Years	Team	Apps	(Gls)
1989–1992	Dinamo Tirana	25+	(2+)
1992–1993	Kolindros		
1993–1994	Pierikos		
1995–1997	Partizani	44	(9)

International career
1990–1991	Albania U-21	5	(0)
1991–1995	Albania	10	(0)

Managerial career
- 2012-2013: Olimpiku
- * Club domestic league appearances and goals

Arbën Milori (born 22 November 1969) is an Albanian former professional footballer who played for Dinamo Tirana, Pierikos and Partizani Tirana, and the Albania national team.

== International career ==
He made his debut for Albania in a May 1991 European Championship qualification match against Czechoslovakia in Tirana and earned a total of 10 caps, scoring no goals. His final international was a November 1995 European Championship qualification match against Wales.

== Managerial career ==
Milori was in charge of Albanian First Division side Olimpiku Tirana in 2013.

== Honours ==
Dinamo Tirana

- Albanian Superliga: 1990
