= Ramiz Bisha =

Albanian footballer

Personal information
- Full name: Ramiz Bisha
- Date of birth: 21 November 1967 (age 58)
- Place of birth: Albania
- Position: Midfielder

Senior career*
Years	Team	Apps	(Gls)
1991	Budućnost Titograd		
1992–1993	Vllaznia Shkodër	11	(2)

International career
1992	Albania	1	(0)
- * Club domestic league appearances and goals

Ramiz Bisha (born 21 November 1967) is an Albanian retired international footballer.

== Club career ==
He played alongside compatriot Zamir Shpuza with FK Budućnost Podgorica in Yugoslavia and KF Vllaznia Shkodër in Albania.

== International career ==
He made his debut for Albania as a second half sub for Besnik Prenga in a November 1992 FIFA World Cup qualification match against Latvia in Tirana. It remained his sole international match.

== Honours ==
Vllaznia

- Albanian Superliga: 1991–92
