= Fiqiri Duro =

Albanian footballer

Personal information
- Full name: Fiqiri Thoma Duro
- Date of birth: November 30, 1938 (age 87)
- Position: Forward

International career
| Years | Team | Apps | (Gls) |
| 1963–1965 | Albania | 4 | (0) |

Fiqiri Thoma Duro (born Nov 30, 1938) is an Albanian footballer. He played in four matches for the Albania national football team from 1963 to 1965.
