= Antonin Naçi =

Albanian footballer

Personal information
- Date of birth: 12 October 1953 (age 73)

International career
| Years | Team | Apps | (Gls) |
| 1976 | Albania | 1 | (0) |

Antonin Naçi (born 12 October 1953) is an Albanian footballer. He played in one match for the Albania national football team in 1976.
