= Millan Vaso =

Albanian footballer

Personal information
- Date of birth: 1951 (age 74–75)

International career
Years	Team	Apps	(Gls)
1973	Albania	3	(0)

Millan Vaso (born 1951) is an Albanian footballer. He played in three matches for the Albania national football team in 1973.
