= Ardian Behari =

Albanian footballer

Personal information
- Full name: Ardian Behari
- Date of birth: 12 March 1973 (age 53)
- Place of birth: Tirana, PR Albania
- Height: 1.87 m (6 ft 1 1/2 in)
- Position: Defender

Senior career*
Years	Team	Apps	(Gls)
1991–2000	Flamurtari	65	(4)
2000–2004	Partizani	70	(1)
2004–2005	Tirana	15	(0)
2005–2007	Flamurtari	19	(0)

International career
1996	Albania	1	(0)

Managerial career
- 2018: Flamurtari
- * Club domestic league appearances and goals

Ardian "Ardi" Behari (born 12 March 1973) is a former Albanian football player.

== Club career ==
He last played for Flamurtari Vlore in the Albanian Superliga.

== International career ==
He was part of the Albania National Team in 1996 and earned 1 cap in a friendly against Bosnia and Herzegovina in Zenica in April 1996.

He has been coach of Flamurtari Vlore youth team and was put in charge of the first team in April 2018 to see out the remainder of the 2017–18 season. After becoming chief scout, he is now director of the education section of the Albanian Football Federation in March 2026.

== Personal life ==
In October 2016, Behari was arrested for his involvement in a car accident which took the life of a 74-year old.
