= Dritan Baholli =

Albanian footballer and coach

Personal information
- Full name: Dritan Baholli
- Date of birth: 23 July 1974 (age 52)
- Place of birth: Tirana, Albania
- Position: Defender

Senior career*
Years	Team	Apps	(Gls)
1991–1995	Tirana	56	(2)
1995–1997	Partizani	46	(3)
1997	Austria Wien	0	(0)
1997	SV Würmla		
1998	Kremser SC		
1998	First Vienna		
1999–2000	Nußdorfer AC		
2000–2001	FC Stadlau		
2001–2003	DSV Fortuna 05 Wien		
2003–2004	SV Wienerberg		

International career^{‡}
1996	Albania	1	(0)

Managerial career
- 2005–2006: Rapid Wien (Fitness coach)
- 2006–2007: Albania (Fitness coach)
- 2010–2011: SC Wiener Neustadt (Fitness coach)
- 2011–2013: Rapid Wien (Assistant)
- * Club domestic league appearances and goals as of 28 June 2011 ‡ National team caps and goals as of 28 June 2011

Dritan Baholli (born 23 July 1974) is an Albanian football coach and a former professional footballer.

He has been assistant manager and fitness coach at Austrian Bundesliga side Rapid Vienna.

== Club career ==
Born in Tirana, Baholli played for Albanian giants SK Tirana and Partizani Tirana in the 1990s before moving to Austria to play for several Austrian lower league clubs.

== International career ==
Baholli made his debut for Albania in an April 1996 friendly match against Bosnia and Hercegovina. It proved to be his only international game.
