= Avenir Dani =

Albanian footballer (born 1965)

Personal information
- Date of birth: 24 April 1965 (age 61)
- Place of birth: Shkodër, Albania
- Position: Goalkeeper

International career
Years	Team	Apps	(Gls)
1992	Albania	3	(0)

Avenir Dani (born 24 April 1965) is an Albanian footballer. He played in three matches for the Albania national football team in 1992.
