= Zamir Shpuza =

Albanian football player and coach

Personal information
- Date of birth: 26 June 1968
- Place of birth: Shkodër, Albania
- Date of death: 10 January 2014 (aged 45)
- Place of death: Speyer, Germany
- Position: Defender

Youth career
- ?–1987: Vllaznia Shkodër
- 1987–1988: Veleçiku

Senior career*
Years	Team	Apps	(Gls)
1988–1989	Vllaznia		
1989-1990	Partizani		
1990–1991	Vllaznia	33	(1)
1991	Budućnost	8	(0)
1992–1993	Vllaznia	9	(0)
1994–1995	FV Speyer		
1995–1996	Waldhof Mannheim	0	(0)
1996–1997	Viktoria Griesheim		
2000–2007	FV Speyer		

International career
- Albania U-21
- Albania Olympic
1991–1997	Albania	5	(0)

Managerial career
- 2000–2007: FV Speyer
- * Club domestic league appearances and goals

Zamir Shpuza (26 June 1968 – 10 January 2014) was an Albanian international football player and coach.

== Club career ==
Born and raised in a traditional family from Shkodër, Shpuza was noticed on the U19 team of KF Vllaznia Shkodër, debuting for the senior squad in the season 1988–89. At that time Albania was still ruled by a communist regime, and in a secret meeting of the local communist party committee, Zamir was playing for Vllaznia U17 team, were expelled from the team as party enemies because their uncles were considered undesired by the party. Their uncle was caught illegally crossing the border and then labeled as "traitor". Nicknamed Tutoja, Zamir and his brother didn't give up football, and joined Veleçiku from Koplik. Soon after, democratic transition began in Albania, and Zamir and Luan joined democratic and anti-communist moviments in Shkodër. They joined the Democratic Party. Coaches Astrit Hafizi and Neptun Bajko took Zamir to the capital to join Albanian giants FK Partizani Tirana. He had the opportunity to show his exceptional talent there, and was rewarded with first calls to Albanian national U21 and Olympic teams.

In 1991 he moved to the Yugoslav side Budućnost Titograd along his compatriot Ramiz Bisha. He played in the 1991–92 Yugoslav First League. and became known as "Albanian Belodedici". In 1992 he returned to Albania, joining KF Vllaznia Shkodër and winning the Albanian championship in 1992. In 1994, he moved to Speyer, Germany, asking for asylum, where is a large Albanian community. There he joined local side FV Speyer. In the 1995–96 season he played with 2. Bundesliga side Waldhof Mannheim but failed to make any league appearance. In 1996 he joined Viktoria Griesheim. Between 2000 and 2007 he was a player-coach of FV Speyer.

== International career ==
He played for Albanian national U21 and Olympic teams before debuting for the main team in 1991. He made his senior debut for Albania in a May 1991 European Championship qualification match against Czechoslovakia and earned a total of 5 caps, scoring no goals. His final international was a June 1997 FIFA World Cup qualification match against Portugal.

== Personal life ==
Shpuza died in Germany in January 2014 from sudden brain hemorrhage. He had a wife and two children.

== Honours ==
Vllaznia

- Albanian Superliga: 1992
