= Anesti Qendro =

Albanian footballer

Nesti Qendro
Personal information
- Full name: Anesti Qendro
- Date of birth: 23 December 1973 (age 52)
- Position: Midfielder

Senior career*
Years	Team	Apps	(Gls)
1990–1991	Lokomotiva	11	(1)
1992–1998	Teuta	136	(11)
-2009	Villabiagio		
2009-2010	ACD Papiano		

International career
1993	Albania U-21		
1992–1995	Albania	3	(1)
- * Club domestic league appearances and goals

Anesti Qendro (born 23 December 1973) is a retired Albanian football midfielder.

== Club career ==
He was a squad member of Teuta Durrës, when they surprisingly won the league title in 1994.

He later played in the Italian amateur leagues.

== International career ==
Qendro played for the Albania national under-21 football team and made his senior debut for Albania in a May 1992 FIFA World Cup qualification match against the Republic of Ireland and earned a total of 3 caps, scoring 1 goal. His final international was a November 1995 friendly match 2–0 win over Bosnia in which he scored the first goal.

== Honours ==
- Albanian Superliga: 1

1994
