= Çlirim Bashi =

Albanian footballer

Personal information
- Date of birth: 5 February 1971 (age 55)
- Height: 1.82 m (6 ft 0 in)
- Position: Defender

Senior career*
Years	Team	Apps	(Gls)
1991–1993	KF Vllaznia Shkodër		
1993–1997	FV Speyer		
1997–1998	Waldhof Mannheim		
1998–2002	Alemannia Aachen		
2005–2006	FV Speyer		

International career
2000	Albania	2	(0)
- * Club domestic league appearances and goals

Çlirim Bashi (born 5 February 1971) is an Albanian former professional footballer who played as a defender. He made two appearances for the Albania national team in 2000.
