= Ismet Hoxha =

Albanian footballer

Personal information
- Date of birth: 23 March 1948 (age 78)

International career
Years	Team	Apps	(Gls)
1973	Albania	3	(0)

Ismet Hoxha (born 23 March 1948) is an Albanian footballer. He played in three matches for the Albania national football team in 1973. His grandson, Sidni, has swum for Albania at three Olympics Games.
