= Milutin Kërçiç =

Albanian footballer

Personal information
- Date of birth: 1958
- Place of birth: Korçë, PR Albania
- Date of death: 7 February 2021 (aged 63)
- Place of death: Gusinje, Montenegro
- Position: Striker

Youth career
- –1975: Skënderbeu

Senior career*
Years	Team	Apps	(Gls)
1975–1983	Skënderbeu		

International career
- Albania U21
1983	Albania	1	(0)

Managerial career
- 2010–2013: Skënderbeu (assistant and translator)
- * Club domestic league appearances and goals

Milutin Kërçiç (Montenegrin: Milutin Kerčić; 1958 – 7 February 2021) was an Albanian football manager and former player who played as a striker.

== Career ==
Born in Korçë, PR Albania to Montenegrin parents from Gusinje, Kërçiç began his football career with local club Skënderbeu, where he played in the youth ranks until 1975 before being promoted to the senior team. He spent his entire senior career at Skënderbeu from 1975 to 1983, representing the club in domestic competitions.

Kërçiç also had a brief international career, featuring for the Albania U21 team, and earning one cap for the senior Albania national team in 1983. Although he did not score at the international level, his contributions at club level made him a notable figure in Albanian football during the late 1970s and early 1980s.

After retiring as a player, Kërçiç worked in football management, serving as an assistant and translator for Slavic-speaking players at Skënderbeu from 2010 to 2013. He died on 7 February 2021 in Gusinje, Montenegro, at the age of 63.
