= Dashnor Dume =

Albanian former footballer and coach

Personal information
- Full name: Dashnor Dume
- Date of birth: 17 September 1963 (age 63)
- Place of birth: Qyteti Stalin, Albania
- Height: 1.87 m (6 ft 2 in)
- Position: Midfielder

Senior career*
Years	Team	Apps	(Gls)
1982	Naftëtari		
1990–1993	Tomori	55+	(5+)
1993–1994	Oțelul Galați	3	(0)
1997–2000	Bylis	72	(8)
2000–2001	Tomori	19	(0)

International career^{‡}
1991	Albania	2	(0)

Managerial career
- 2008: Bylis Ballsh
- 2012–2013: Naftëtari (TD)
- 2015: Naftëtari
- * Club domestic league appearances and goals as of 18 November 2016 ‡ National team caps and goals as of 18 November 2016

Dashnor Dume (born 17 September 1963) is an Albanian former footballer and coach.

== Club career ==
Dume played most of his club career in Albania representing hometown club Naftëtari Qyteti Stalin as well as local rivals Tomori Berat and Bylis Ballsh, and also had a brief spell in Romania with Oțelul Galați alongside compatriot Altin Masati.

Dume was part of Bylis Ballsh's golden days, helped the club reach Europe for the first time in their history, and they were tied against Slovak side FK Senica, whom they lost to 5–1 on aggregate, with Dume captaining the team in both games.

== International career ==
Dume is also a former Albania international, playing two matches. He made his international debut on 30 March 1991 in the 5–0 away defeat at France for the UEFA Euro 1992 qualifying.

=== International statistics ===
Albania national team
Year	Apps	Goals
1991	2	0
Total	2	0

== Coaching career ==
After his retirement, Dume took care of Bylis Ballsh as a coach for only one match. In 2012/13 he was technical director at Naftëtari Kuçovë.
