= Ahmet Ahmedani =

Albanian footballer

Personal information
- Date of birth: 15 January 1949 (age 77)
- Position: Goalkeeper

International career
Years	Team	Apps	(Gls)
1976	Albania	1	(0)

Ahmet Ahmedani (born 15 January 1949) is an Albanian footballer. He played in one match for the Albania national football team in 1976.
