= Artan Vila =

Albanian footballer

Personal information
- Date of birth: 4 May 1970 (age 56)
- Place of birth: Durrës, Albania
- Height: 1.81 m (5 ft 11 in)
- Position: Defender

Senior career*
Years	Team	Apps	(Gls)
1992–1996	Teuta	93	(3)
1996–1997	Besa	14	(0)
1997–1998	Teuta	7	(0)

International career
1996–1997	Albania	2	(0)
- * Club domestic league appearances and goals

Artan Vila (born 4 May 1970) is a retired Albanian football defender.

== Club career ==
Vila played the majority of his career for hometown club Teuta Durrës, with whom he won the 1994 league title.

== International career ==
He made his debut for Albania in a November 1996 FIFA World Cup qualification match against Armenia in Tirana and earned a total of 2 caps, scoring no goals. His other international game was a June 1997 World Cup qualification match against Portugal.

== Honours ==
- Albanian Superliga: 1

1994
