= Agonit Sallaj =

Albanian footballer (born 1992)

Personal information
- Full name: Agonit Azem Sallaj
- Date of birth: 14 February 1992 (age 34)
- Place of birth: Gjakova, SFR Yugoslavia
- Height: 1.84 m (6 ft 0 in)
- Position: Centre back

Senior career*
Years	Team	Apps	(Gls)
2010–2012	Neuchâtel Xamax	0	(0)
2011–2012	→ Biel-Bienne (loan)	24	(2)
2012–2013	Biel-Bienne	3	(0)
2013	→ Fribourg (loan)	1	(0)
2014	Bulle	10	(1)
2014–2015	Le Mont	5	(0)
2015–2017	Neuchâtel Xamax	3	(0)

International career
2011−2013	Albania U21	10	(0)
2012−2013	Albania	1	(0)
- * Club domestic league appearances and goals as of 30 July 2017

Agonit Azem Sallaj (born 14 February 1992) is a footballer who played mainly as a defender. Born in Yugoslavia, he represented Albania internationally.

== Club career ==
Sallaj began his career at Neuchâtel Xamax in Switzerland, he spent two years at the club without making an appearance. For the 2011–12 season Sallaj joined Biel-Bienne on a seasons loan where he made twenty-four league appearances whilst scoring two goals, he also played in three Swiss Cup matches, scoring in one of them, during the loan spell. Once Sallaj's loan ended he was released by parent club Neuchâtel Xamax.

In summer 2012, Sallaj had a trial at English club Portsmouth, after featuring in two games against Aldershot Town and Bolton Wanderers in friendly matches, manager Michael Appleton ended his interest in signing Sallaj.

Biel-Bienne resigned Sallaj permanently in September 2012. His permanent spell at Biel-Bienne was less successful after he made just three appearances, due to his lack of game time he joined Fribourg on loan in January 2013 for the remainder of the season.

Sallaj made one appearance while at Fribourg, he returned to Biel-Bienne where he was subsequently released in July 2013. It took Sallaj seven months to find a new club until he joined Bulle in January 2014, he remained at the Swiss club before leaving in July of that year to join Le Mont. Salaj stayed with Le Mont until February 2015 when he rejoined former club Neuchâtel Xamax on a contract lasting until the summer of 2016.

In summer 2017 he quit football due to a persistent knee injury sustained in an August 2015 match against former club Biel-Bienne.

== International career ==
Being born in Kosovo, then Serbia, FR Yugoslavia, to ethnic Albanian parents and raised in Switzerland, Sallaj was eligible to play for Switzerland, Albania and Kosovo if a national team should be formed, but in March 2011 he answered the call by Albania's U-21 coach Artan Bushati for a friendly tournament in Slovenia. He was then given Albanian citizenship in order to represent the country.

Sallaj was selected by Josip Kuže for a friendly against Argentina on 20 June 2011. He made his debut in the 67th minute as a substitute in a game which ended in a 4–0 loss.
