= Efstrat Billa =

Albanian footballer

Personal information
- Date of birth: 13 June 1980 (age 46)
- Place of birth: Vlorë, Albania
- Position: Goalkeeper

Senior career*
Years	Team	Apps	(Gls)
1997–2003	Flamurtari	81	(0)
2003–2004	Atromitos	8	(0)
2004	Partizani	2	(0)
2004	Egnatia	7	(0)
2005	Shkumbini	20	(0)
2005	Egnatia	0	(0)
2005–2006	Akratitos	4	(0)
2006–2007	Flamurtari	1	(0)
2007–2008	Skënderbeu	8	(0)
2008–2010	Gramshi	19	(0)

International career
2003	Albania	2	(0)
- * Club domestic league appearances and goals

Efstrat Billa (born 13 June 1980, in Vlorë) is a retired Albanian football player. He has played for Albania national team.

== International career ==
He made his debut for Albania in an October 2003 friendly match against Portugal in Lisbon and earned a total of 2 caps, scoring no goals. His other international game was a November 2003 friendly match against Estonia. In both games he came on as a sub for Foto Strakosha.

=== National team statistics ===
Albania national team
Year	Apps	Goals
2003	2	0
Total	2	0

== Coaching career ==
In January 2014, Billa was appointed goalkeeper coach of Kukësi.
