= Aleko Bregu =

Albanian footballer

Personal information
- Date of birth: 2 July 1957 (age 69)
- Position: Defender

International career
Years	Team	Apps	(Gls)
1980–1982	Albania	2	(0)

Aleko Bregu (born 2 July 1957) is an Albanian footballer. He played in two matches for the Albania national football team from 1980 to 1982.
