= Julian Gjeloshi =

Albanian footballer

Personal information
- Full name: Julian (Luljan) Gjeloshi
- Date of birth: 1 April 1974 (age 52)
- Place of birth: Lezhë, Albania
- Position: Goalkeeper

Senior career*
Years	Team	Apps	(Gls)
1993–1996	Besëlidhja	82	(7)
1996–1997	Flamurtari	12	(0)
1997–1998	Partizani	28	(0)
1998–1999	Vllaznia	23	(0)
1999–2000	Hemel Hempstead	15	(0)
2000–2001	Partick Thistle	0	(0)
2002–2003	Atromitos	15	(0)
2003	Proodeftiki	0	(0)
2004	Torpedo-SKA Minsk	8	(0)
2004–2005	Atromitos	9	(0)
2005	Apollon Smyrnis	13	(0)
2006–2009	Laçi		

International career^{‡}
2002	Albania	1	(0)
- * Club domestic league appearances and goals as of July 2009 ‡ National team caps and goals as of 2 November 2009

Julian (Luljan) Gjeloshi (born 1 April 1974, in Lezhë) is a retired Albanian footballer/goalkeeper who last played for KF Laçi in Albania.

== Club career ==
Gjeloshi played for Atromitos F.C. in the Beta Ethniki during the 2002–03 season. He joined Proodeftiki F.C. in the Alpha Ethniki for the next season, but he did not appear in any league matches.

== International career ==
He made his debut for Albania in a January 2002 Bahrain Tournament match against hosts Bahrain, coming on as a second half sub for Ilion Lika. It would remain his only cap.
