= Naim Allaj =

Albanian footballer

Personal information
- Date of birth: 30 November 1950 (age 75)
- Place of birth: Kavajë, PR Albania
- Position: Midfielder

Senior career*
Years	Team	Apps	(Gls)
- Besa Kavajë

International career
1973	Albania	2	(0)
- * Club domestic league appearances and goals

Naim Allaj (born 30 November 1950) is an Albanian retired international footballer who played as a midfielder. He played for Besa Kavajë in the Albanian Superliga.

== International career ==
Allaj made his debut for Albania in a 1974 FIFA World Cup qualification match against Finland. His other cap was earned in a November 1973 friendly against China.
