= Uliks Kotrri =

Albanian footballer

Personal information
- Date of birth: 21 June 1975 (age 51)
- Place of birth: Shkodër, Albania
- Height: 1.83 m (6 ft 0 in)
- Position: Midfielder

Senior career*
| Years | Team | Apps | (Gls) |
| 1992–1995 | Vllaznia | 60 | (7) |
| 1995–1996 | Austria Klagenfurt | 13 | (4) |
| 1996 | Vllaznia | 13 | (2) |
| 1997–1998 | Energie Cottbus | 2 | (0) |
| 1998–2000 | Vllaznia | 29 | (1) |
| 2003–2004 | Tavriya Simferopol | 1 | (0) |
| 2004–2006 | Otago United | | |
| 2006–2008 | Vllaznia | 42 | (1) |
| Total | | 160 | (15) |

International career
| 1998 | Albania | 3 | (0) |
- * Club domestic league appearances and goals

Uliks Kotrri (born 21 June 1975) is an Albanian former professional footballer who played as a midfielder.

== Club career ==
Kotrri was born in Shkodër. At club level, he played for hometown club Vllaznia Shkodër and abroad for Austria Klagenfurt, Energie Cottbus, Tavriya Simferopol, and Otago United.

== International career ==
He made his debut for Albania in a January 1998 friendly match against Turkey and earned a total of three caps, scoring no goals. His final international was a February 1998 Malta Tournament match against Latvia.

== Personal life ==
Kotrri now works as a FIFA agent.

His son Enea Uliks Kotrri has played for the Albania U16 national team and for Energie Cottbus academy.
