= Qemal Vogli =

Albanian footballer

Personal information
- Full name: Qemal Vogli
- Date of birth: 29 September 1929
- Place of birth: Kavajë, Albania
- Date of death: 4 July 2004 (aged 74)
- Place of death: Albania
- Height: 1.90 m (6 ft 3 in)
- Position: Goalkeeper

Senior career*
Years	Team	Apps	(Gls)
1946	Besa Kavajë		
1947	Ylli i Kuq Durrës		
1950–1951	Dinamo Tirana		
1955–1956	Dinamo Tirana		

International career
1947–1953	Albania	11	(0)
- * Club domestic league appearances and goals

Qemal Vogli (29 September 1929 – 4 July 2004) was a famous Albanian footballer who played most of his professional career as goalkeeper for Dinamo Tirana football club. Vogli is widely considered as the greatest goalkeeper in the history of Albanian football.

== Club career ==
Born on either 29 September or 15 March 1929 in Kavajë, Vogli made his senior debut in 1946 for hometown club Besa.

=== Escape from and return to Albania ===
Since the communist regime of Enver Hoxha had deemed the Vogli family as enemies of the state due to alleged links to the Nazis, Vogli was forced to join Ministry of Interior club Dinamo Tirana and to spy on people for the regime. He finally escaped the country in West Berlin on 3 September 1956, only to be brought back to Albania shortly afterwards by the Sigurimi and the Stasi. He was sentenced to 15 years in prison, but was released after five years. He was however never allowed to play football again and was kept under constant surveillance by the Sigurimi until the collapse of communism. It was claimed Minister of Interior Kadri Hazbiu was a big fan of Vogli and allowed him to play in Berlin against communist rules, because of Vogli having two brothers in prison. he was called: the black cat.

== International career ==
At the age of 17 he became the youngest goalkeeper ever to wear the Albania national football team kit, making his debut in a May 1947 Balkan Cup match against Romania. He earned a total of 11 caps, scoring no goals. His final international was a November 1953 friendly match against Poland.

== Personal life ==
After leaving prison, Vogli worked at the automobile park and was allowed to train goalkeepers. After the fall of communism he was honoured for his contribution to Albanian football. Hospital records claimed he died from diabetes in July 2004, his health had worsened after he was injured in a car accident the month before. He was survived by his wife Liri and their children.

== Honours ==
- Albanian Superliga: 4

1950, 1951, 1955, 1956
