= Fatos Daja =

Albanian footballer and manager

Personal information
- Full name: Fatos Daja
- Date of birth: 11 January 1968 (age 58)
- Place of birth: Tirana, Albania
- Position: Defender

Senior career*
Years	Team	Apps	(Gls)
1987–1992	17 Nëntori		
1992–1999	St. Patrick	121	(19)
1999–2001	Ħamrun Spartans	44	(4)
2001–2002	Qormi	17	(2)

International career
1991–1997	Albania	6	(0)

Managerial career
- 2001–2002: Qormi
- 2002–2003: Balzan Youths
- 2023–2024: St. Patrick (asst.)
- * Club domestic league appearances and goals

Fatos Daja (born 11 January 1968, in Albania) is a former Albanian football defender. He earned 6 caps for the Albania national team during 1991 to 1997.

== International career ==
He made his debut for Albania in a May 1991 European Championship qualification match in Tirana against Czechoslovakia and earned a total of 6 caps, scoring no goals. His final international was a March 1997 FIFA World Cup qualification match against Ukraine.

== Managerial career ==
As a manager, Daja got relegated with Qormi to the third level in 2002 and was coach of then-Maltese First Division side Balzan Youths in the 2002–03 season.

== Honours ==
as a player

- Maltese Challenge League: 2

1995, 2000
