= Skënder Halili =

Albanian footballer

Personal information
- Full name: Skënder Ahmet Halili
- Date of birth: 20 August 1940
- Place of birth: Tirana, Albania
- Date of death: 13 December 1982 (aged 42)
- Place of death: Tirana, Albania
- Position: Centre back

Youth career
- 1954–1957: Puna Tirana

Senior career*
Years	Team	Apps	(Gls)
1957–1959	17 Nëntori		
1959–1961	Dinamo		
1963–1966	17 Nëntori		

International career
1963–1965	Albania	11	(0)
- * Club domestic league appearances and goals

Skënder Ahmet Halili (born 20 August 1940 – 13 December 1982) was an Albanian football player who played for 17 Nëntori, Dinamo and the Albania national team.

== Club career ==
Halili played for Dinamo Tirana from December 1959 until December 1961, when he was suspended for a year after he wanted to, but was not allowed to, leave Dinamo.

== International career ==
He made his debut for Albania in a June 1963 Olympic Games qualification match against Bulgaria and earned a total of 11 caps, scoring no goals. His final international was a November 1965 FIFA World Cup qualification match against Northern Ireland.

== Personal life ==
In 1966, he was arrested and imprisoned for 11 months for allegedly doing business on the black market and later sent to work in the copper mines. It automatically meant his playing career finished at 26. He died in December 1982 from a serious illness.

== Honours ==
Dinamo

- Albanian National Championship (1): 1960

17 Nëntori

- Albanian National Championship (2): 1964–65, 1965–66
- Republic Cup (1): 1962–63
