= Sotir Shkurti =

Albanian footballer (born 1962)

Personal information
- Date of birth: 27 August 1962 (age 64)
- Place of birth: Albania
- Position: Goalkeeper

Senior career*
Years	Team	Apps	(Gls)
1982–1992	Besa Kavajë		

International career
1982	Albania U-18		
1987–1990	Albania	4	(0)
- * Club domestic league appearances and goals

Sotir "Til" Shkurti (born 27 August 1962) is an Albanian retired footballer, who played his entire professional career as goalie for Besa Kavajë football club.

== International career ==
In 1982, Shkurti played in an Albania national under-18 football team comprising fellow future senior international players like Skënder Gega, Mirel Josa and Sulejman Demollari.

He made his senior debut for Albania in an October 1987 Euro Championship qualification match against Romania and earned a total of 4 caps, scoring no goals.

His final international was a September 1990 friendly match against Greece.
