= Bimo Fakja =

Albanian footballer (1920–1982)

Personal information
- Full name: Bimo Fakja
- Date of birth: 1920
- Place of birth: Kiras, Shkodër, Principality of Albania
- Date of death: 15 February 1982 (aged 61–62)
- Height: 1.75 m (5 ft 9 in)
- Position: Left midfielder

Senior career*
Years	Team	Apps	(Gls)
1936–1939	Vllaznia		
1940–1947	Vllaznia		
1947–1949	Partizani		
1949–1950	Flamurtari		
1950–1951	Vllaznia		

International career
1946–1948	Albania	6	(0)
- * Club domestic league appearances and goals

Bimo Fakja (1920 – 15 February 1982) was an Albanian footballer who played for Vllaznia Shkodër, Partizani Tirana and Flamurtari Vlorë as well as the Albania national team. He was also known for being part of the 1946 Albania vs Yugoslavia football match, which was Albania's first official match. In total, he earned 6 caps for the national team between 1946 and 1952.

== International career ==
Fakja made his debut for Albania in an August 1946 friendly match against Montenegro in Shkodër and earned a total of 6 caps, scoring no goals. His final international was a May 1948 Balkan Cup match against Romania.

== Death ==
Bimo Fakja died on 15 February 1982.

== Honours ==
- Kategoria Superiore (3): 1945, 1946, 1948.
