= Mihal Gjika =

Albanian footballer

Personal information
- Date of birth: 3 January 1947 (age 79)
- Position: Defender

International career
Years	Team	Apps	(Gls)
1971–1974	Albania	12	(1)

Mihal Gjika (born 3 January 1947) is an Albanian footballer who played as a defender. He made twelve appearances for the Albania national team from 1971 to 1974.

== Personal life ==
Gjika had eight siblings: five brothers and three sisters. He and his brothers all played for clubs in the town of Elbasan while his sister was one the first girls from Elbasan to play basketball.
