= Luan Seiti =

Albanian footballer

Personal information
- Date of birth: 1957 (age 68–69)

International career
Years	Team	Apps	(Gls)
1981	Albania	1	(0)

Luan Seiti (born 1957) is an Albanian footballer. He played in one match for the Albania national football team in 1981.
