= Pjerin Noga =

Albanian footballer

Personal information
- Date of birth: 13 January 1963 (age 63)
- Place of birth: Albania
- Position: Defender

Senior career*
Years	Team	Apps	(Gls)
1979–1990	Dinamo Tirana		
1994	Connecticut Wolves		

International career
1989–1990	Albania	3	(0)
- * Club domestic league appearances and goals

Pjerin Noga (born 13 January 1963) is an Albanian retired footballer, who played the majority of his career as a defender for Dinamo Tirana.

== International career ==
He made his debut for Albania in an April 1989 FIFA World Cup qualification match against England and earned a total of 3 caps, scoring no goals.

His final international was a May 1990 European Championship qualification match against Iceland.

=== Defection ===
Noga disappeared from the Dinamo Tirana squad in September 1990 at Marseille Airport after playing a European Champions Cup match against Olympique Marseille. At the time, Albania was still ruled by the communists. He later announced he would apply for political asylum in France. Noga was the first player not to return to Albania.

He later moved to the United States.

== Honours ==
- Albanian Superliga: 3

1980, 1986, 1990
