= Adrian Barbullushi =

Albanian footballer

Personal information
- Date of birth: 12 December 1968 (age 57)
- Place of birth: Albania
- Position: Midfielder

Senior career*
Years	Team	Apps	(Gls)
1990–1991	FK Vllaznia	38	(7)
1991–1992	Egaleo		
1992–1995	Ionikos	15	(0)

International career
1990–1992	Albania	5	(0)
- * Club domestic league appearances and goals

Adrian Barbullushi (born 12 December 1968) is a retired Albanian international football player.

== Club career ==
Barbullushi played for Ionikos F.C. in the Greek Alpha Ethniki during the 1992–93 and 1994–95 seasons. He also played for Ionikos in the Beta Ethniki during the 1993–94 season.

== International career ==
Barbullushi made his debut for Albania in a September 1990 friendly match against Greece and has earned a total of 5 caps, scoring no goals. He has represented his country in 1 FIFA World Cup qualification match.

His final international was an April 1992 FIFA World Cup qualification match against Spain.
