= Spiko Çuri =

Albanian footballer

Personal information
- Date of birth: 30 November 1953 (age 72)
- Place of birth: Forward

International career
| Years | Team | Apps | (Gls) |
| 1983 | Albania | 1 | (0) |

Spiko Çuri (born 30 November 1953) is an Albanian footballer. He played in one match for the Albania national football team in 1973.
