= Alvaro Zalla =

Albanian footballer

Personal information
- Date of birth: 22 December 1973 (age 52)
- Place of birth: Durrës, Albania
- Height: 1.76 m (5 ft 9 in)
- Position: Midfielder

Senior career*
Years	Team	Apps	(Gls)
1990–1995	Teuta		
1995–1996	SV Wehen-Taunusstein		
1995–1996	SV Wehen-Taunusstein II		
1996–1997	KF Tirana		
1997–1998	SV Wehen-Taunusstein		
1997–1998	SV Wehen-Taunusstein II		
1998–1999	Viktoria Aschaffenburg		
1999–2005	Eintracht Nordhorn		
2005–2006	SV Meppen		
2006–2008	FC Oberneuland	44	(1)

International career
1993–1996	Albania	6	(0)
- * Club domestic league appearances and goals

Alvaro Zalla (born 22 December 1973) is an Albanian former footballer who played as a midfielder. He made six appearances for the Albania national team from 1993 to 1996.
