= Mehdi Bushati =

Albanian footballer

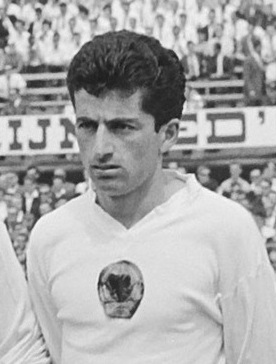
- Bushati in 1964

Personal information
- Date of birth: 20 February 1939 (age 87)
- Position: Midfielder

International career
Years	Team	Apps	(Gls)
1963–1965	Albania	6	(0)

Mehdi Bushati (born 20 February 1939) is an Albanian footballer. He played in six matches for the Albania national football team from 1963 to 1965.
