= Ferdinand Lleshi =

Albanian footballer

Personal information
- Date of birth: 1956 (age 69–70)

International career
Years	Team	Apps	(Gls)
1976–1981	Albania	8	(0)

Ferdinand Lleshi (born 1956) is an Albanian footballer. He played in eight matches for the Albania national football team from 1976 to 1981.
