= Shefqet Topi =

Albanian footballer

Personal information
- Full name: Shefqet Topi
- Date of birth: 1 January 1934
- Place of birth: Kavajë, Albania
- Date of death: 1 January 1998 (aged 64)
- Position: Goalkeeper

Senior career*
Years	Team	Apps	(Gls)
1956-1957	Partizani		
1958–1970	Besa		

International career
1957–1963	Albania	2	(0)
- * Club domestic league appearances and goals

Shefqet Topi (1934–1998) was an Albanian footballer who played most of his professional career as a goalkeeper for Besa Kavajë football club. He was also capped with the Albania National Football Team in the early 1960s.

A picture of an acrobatic save by Topi in a match against 17 Nëntori in 1961 became one of Albania's most iconic football photos.

== International career ==
He made his debut for Albania in a September 1957 friendly match away against China and earned a total of 2 caps, scoring no goals. His other international game was an October 1963 European Championship qualification match against Denmark.

== Honours ==
- Albanian Superliga: 1

1957
