= Rudi Vata =

Albanian footballer and manager (born 1969)

Personal information
- Date of birth: 13 February 1969 (age 57)
- Place of birth: Shkodër, Albania
- Height: 1.83 m (6 ft 0 in)
- Position: Defender

Youth career
- 1980–1988: Vllaznia

Senior career*
Years	Team	Apps	(Gls)
1988–1990	Vllaznia	40	(5)
1990–1991	Dinamo Tirana	20	(2)
1991	Le Mans	18	(0)
1992	Tours		
1992–1993	Dinamo Tirana	22	(3)
1993–1996	Celtic	45	(4)
1996–1998	Apollon Limassol	50	(9)
1998–2001	Energie Cottbus	81	(2)
2001–2002	Rot-Weiß Ahlen	10	(0)
2002–2003	Tirana	30	(2)
2003	Yokohama FC	24	(3)
2003–2004	St Johnstone	15	(0)
2004–2005	Partizani	20	(1)
Total		375	(31)

International career
1990–2001	Albania	59	(5)

Managerial career
- 2011–2012: Vllaznia
- * Club domestic league appearances and goals

Rudi Vata (born 13 February 1969) is an Albanian former professional footballer who played as a defender, and had also a short stint as a manager of Albanian team KF Vllaznia Shkodër.

== Club career ==
=== Early life ===
Vata was born in the northern city of Shkodër and joined local side Vllaznia Shkodër at a young age, making his first team debut in 1988. Whilst travelling with the Albania national football team in France he sought political asylum in 1991.

Vata's career in Western football began in France in 1991, when the KS Dinamo Tirana player claimed political asylum following an international match. He played for Le Mans and Tours, before playing for Celtic between January 1993 and 1995–96. He became the first Albanian to win an honour in a major European country when he won the 1995 Scottish FA Cup with Celtic.

Vata went on to play for Apollon Limassol (1996–1998), Energie Cottbus (1998–2001), Rot-Weiß Ahlen (January–June 2002) and SK Tirana (2002–2003). This was followed by a spell in Japan, after which he signed for St Johnstone in 2004. He retired from football in 2005 after a brief stint with KF Partizani Tirana.

Since retiring from the professional game, Vata has become a sports agent, specialising in Eastern European football, and facilitating the transfer of players such as Garry O'Connor and Aiden McGeady.

== International career ==
He made his debut for Albania in a May 1990 European Championship qualification match away against Iceland and earned a total of 59 caps, scoring 5 goals. His final international was a 1 September 2001 FIFA World Cup qualification match against Finland.

== Personal life ==
Vata is married to Anne Frances from Wishaw, Lanarkshire in Scotland, whom he met during his time playing at Celtic. They have two sons together, Ruan and Rocco, both of whom were born in Scotland. They live in Hamilton, Scotland.

Rocco plays for English Championship club Watford and received his first Ireland senior call up in March 2025.

== Career statistics ==
=== Club ===
Appearances and goals by club, season and competition
Club	Season	League		
Club	Season	Division	Apps	Goals
Vllaznia Shkodër	1988–89	Superliga		
Vllaznia Shkodër	1989–90	Superliga		
Vllaznia Shkodër	Total			
Dinamo Tirana	1990–91	Superliga	6	0
Le Mans	1991–92	Division 2		
Tours	1991–92	Division 2		
Dinamo Tirana	1992–93	Superliga		
Celtic	1992–93	Premier Division	22	2
Celtic	1993–94	Premier Division	10	1
Celtic	1994–95	Premier Division	7	1
Celtic	1995–96	Premier Division	6	0
Celtic	Total		60	4
Apollon Limassol	1996–97	First Division	25	4
Apollon Limassol	1997–98	First Division	24	5
Apollon Limassol	Total		49	9
Energie Cottbus	1998–99	2. Bundesliga	25	0
Energie Cottbus	1999–2000	2. Bundesliga	25	1
Energie Cottbus	2000–01	Bundesliga	30	1
Energie Cottbus	2001–02	Bundesliga	1	0
Energie Cottbus	Total		81	2
LR Ahlen	2001–02	2. Bundesliga	8	0
Tirana	2002–03	Superliga	13	4
Yokohama FC	2003	J2 League	24	3
St Johnstone	2003–04	First Division	15	0
Career total			241	22

=== International ===
Appearances and goals by national team and year
National team	Year	Apps	Goals
Albania	1990	1	0
Albania	1991	1	0
Albania	1992	5	0
Albania	1993	6	0
Albania	1994	3	0
Albania	1995	5	1
Albania	1996	4	0
Albania	1997	7	1
Albania	1998	8	0
Albania	1999	8	1
Albania	2000	7	2
Albania	2001	4	0
Total		59	5

== Honours ==
Dinamo Tirana

- Albanian Superliga: 1990

Celtic

- Scottish Cup: 1994–95

KF Tirana

- Albanian Superliga: 2003
- Albanian Supercup: 2002

Albania

- Malta International Tournament: 2000
