= Ervin Lamçe =

Albanian footballer

Personal information
- Date of birth: 11 September 1972 (age 54)
- Place of birth: Tirana, Albania
- Position: Midfielder

Senior career*
| Years | Team | Apps | (Gls) |
| 1989–1992 | KF Tirana | | |
| 1995–1998 | VfL 93 Hamburg | | |
| 1998–2007 | VfR Neumünster | | |

International career
| 1995–1997 | Albania | 3 | (0) |

Managerial career
- 2003–2007: VfR Neumünster (assistant)
- 2007–2014: VfR Neumünster
- * Club domestic league appearances and goals

Ervin Lamçe (born 11 September 1972) is an Albanian former footballer who played as a midfielder. He made three appearances for the Albania national team from 1995 to 1997.
