= Artur Maxhuni =

Albanian footballer

Personal information
- Date of birth: 27 October 1972 (age 54)
- Place of birth: Kavajë, Albania
- Height: 1.80 m (5 ft 11 in)
- Position: Forward

Senior career*
Years	Team	Apps	(Gls)
1992–1993	Tirana	18	(2)
1997–1998	Wehen Wiesbaden	33	(13)
1998–1998	FC St. Pauli	11	(1)
1999–2000	Darmstadt 98	12	(2)
2000–2001	Wehen Wiesbaden	7	(0)
2001–2002	Concordia Hamburg		
2002–2005	VfL 93 Hamburg		

International career
1998	Albania	1	(0)
- * Club domestic league appearances and goals

Artur Maxhuni (born 27 October 1972) is an Albanian former professional footballer who played as a forward in the 2. Bundesliga for SV Wehen Wiesbaden, FC St. Pauli, Darmstadt 98 and SC Concordia Hamburg.

== International career ==
Maxhuni made his debut for Albania as a late substitute for Arjan Peço in a September 1998 European Championship qualification match against Georgia, which remained his sole cap.
