= Roland Iljadhi =

Albanian footballer (born 1963)

Personal information
- Date of birth: 18 August 1963 (age 63)
- Place of birth: Vlorë, Albania
- Position: Defender

Senior career*
Years	Team	Apps	(Gls)
1987–1991	Flamurtari Vlorë		
1991–1994	Panachaiki	31	(3)

International career
1987–1990	Albania	4	(0)
- * Club domestic league appearances and goals

Roland Iljadhi (born 18 August 1963) is an Albanian retired footballer, who played as a defender for Flamurtari Vlorë.

== Club career ==
As soon as Albanians were free to leave the country after the end of the communist era, Iljadhi moved abroad to play alongside compatriot Alfred Ferko in neighboring Greece for Panachaiki Patras.

== International career ==
He made his debut for Albania in an October 1987 European Championship qualification match against Romania and earned a total of 4 caps, scoring no goals.

His final international was a May 1990 European Championship qualification match against Iceland.

== Honours ==
- Albanian Superliga: 1

1991
