= Jani Rama =

Albanian footballer

Personal information
- Date of birth: 12 November 1944 (age 81)

International career
Years	Team	Apps	(Gls)
1967–1973	Albania	4	(0)

Jani Rama (born 12 November 1944) is an Albanian footballer. He played in four matches for the Albania national football team from 1967 to 1973.
