= Përikli Dhales =

Albanian footballer

Personal information
- Date of birth: 2 August 1947
- Date of death: 13 June 2018 (aged 70)
- Position: Defender

International career
Years	Team	Apps	(Gls)
1963–1965	Albania	5	(0)

Përikli Dhales (2 August 1947 – 13 June 2018) was an Albanian footballer. He played in five matches for the Albania national football team from 1963 to 1965.
