= Fatmir Hasanpapa =

Albanian footballer

Personal information
- Date of birth: 19 April 1965 (age 61)
- Place of birth: Albania
- Position: Midfielder

Senior career*
Years	Team	Apps	(Gls)
1986–1991	Partizani Tirana	4	
- SC 09 Erkelenz
- TuS Kückhoven
1997–2001	FC Wegberg-Beeck		
2001–2005	SC Jülich 1910		
2005–2007	SC Rheindahlen		

International career
1989	Albania	1	(0)
- * Club domestic league appearances and goals

Fatmir Hasanpapa (born 19 April 1965) is an Albanian retired footballer, who played as a midfielder for Partizani Tirana and later in Germany.

== Club career ==
Hasanpapa played for Partizani in the 1991–92 European Cup Winners' Cup game against Dutch club Feyenoord in Rotterdam and decided not to return to communist Albania after the match, but to leave for Germany where he played for Erkelenz, Kückhoven and Wegberg. He made a total of 4 appearances for the club. He later surfaced at SC Jülich, where he became subject of a TV documentary. At 42, he still played for fellow German amateur side SC Rheindahlen.

== International career ==
He made his debut for Albania in an April 1989 FIFA World Cup qualification match against England, which proved to be his sole international game. He started that game after Mirel Josa was out injured.

== Honours ==
- Albanian Superliga: 1987
