= Bajram Fraholli =

Albanian footballer

Personal information
- Full name: Bajram Fraholli
- Date of birth: 14 September 1968 (age 58)
- Place of birth: Qyteti Stalin, Albania
- Height: 1.72 m (5 ft 7 1/2 in)
- Position: Left midfielder

Senior career*
Years	Team	Apps	(Gls)
- Naftëtari
1992–1993	Pogradeci	28	(2)
1993–1994	Teuta	39	(5)
1995–1996	Besa	41	(3)
1996–1997	Lushnja	17	(0)

International career
1996	Albania	2	(1)

Managerial career
- 2008–2010: Naftëtari
- 2011–2012: Naftëtari
- 2013–2014: Jehona
- 2015: Naftëtari
- 2015–2016: Jehona
- 2016–: Naftëtari
- * Club domestic league appearances and goals

Bajram Fraholli (born 14 September 1968 in Qyteti Stalin) is a former Albanian footballer who played as a left sided midfielder.

== International career ==
He made his debut for Albania in a November 1996 FIFA World Cup qualification match against Armenia in Tirana and earned a total of 2 caps, scoring 1 goal. His final international was a December 1996 World Cup qualification match against Northern Ireland.

== Honours ==
- Albanian Superliga: 1

1994
