= Afrim Tole =

Albanian footballer and politician

Afrim Tola

Director of State and Quality of the Environment
- Incumbent
- Assumed office 29 January 2014
- Preceded by: office established

Director of KS Partizani Tirana
- In office unknown–unknown

Director of KS Partizani Tirana
- In office unknown–unknown

Personal details
- Born: 10 April 1970 (age 56) Albania
- Party: Republican Party
Association football career
- Height: 1.74 m (5 ft 9 in)
- Position: Midfielder
Senior career*
Years	Team	Apps	(Gls)
1991–1992	Dinamo Tiranaa		
1994–1995	Tirana		
1995–1998	Partizani		
1998–2000	Teuta		
International career
1995–1998	Albania	9	(0)
- * Club domestic league appearances and goals

Afrim Tola (born 10 April 1970) is an Albanian former professional footballer who played as a midfielder. He has previously been the director of KS Partizani Tirana in the 2000s.
