= Gentjan Çoçja =

Albanian footballer

Gentian Çoçja
Personal information
- Full name: Gentian Çoçja
- Date of birth: 18 March 1974 (age 52)
- Place of birth: Albania
- Position: Midfielder

Senior career*
Years	Team	Apps	(Gls)
199x–199x	Vllaznia	?	(?)

International career
1995	Albania	1	(0)
- * Club domestic league appearances and goals

Gentian Çoçja (born 18 March 1974) is an Albanian former footballer.

== International statistics ==
As of 23 March 2020

Albania national team
Year	Apps	Goals
1995	1	0
Total	1	0
