= Artur Lekbello (footballer, born 1958) =

Albanian footballer

Personal information
- Full name: Artur Shkëlqim Lekbello
- Date of birth: 25 January 1958 (age 68)
- Place of birth: Lezhë, Albania
- Height: 1.86 m (6 ft 1 in)
- Position: Goalkeeper

Youth career
- 1974–1978: Partizani Tirana

Senior career*
Years	Team	Apps	(Gls)
1978–1984	Partizani		
1984–1986	17 Nëntori		
1986–1987	Flamurtari		
1987–1988	Lokomotiva Durrës	33	(0)
1988–1990	17 Nëntori		
1990–1991	Lokomotiva Durrës	7	(0)
1991–1992	Partizani		

International career
1987	Albania	2	(0)
- * Club domestic league appearances and goals

Artur Lekbello (born 25 January 1958) is an Albanian retired footballer who played as a goalkeeper.

== Club career ==
Lekbello came into football during his school years in Durrës and when he joined the army's tank brigade in 1975 he became reserve goalkeeper at army team Partizani Tirana alongside Perlat Musta. During the communist era it was not common for players to change clubs but Lekbello returned to his hometown to play for Lokomotiva Durrës in 1985, only to be ordered by the football federation to join Flamurtari to play in the 1986 UEFA Cup against FC Barcelona after their first goalkeeper Luan Birçe was not allowed to travel and young reserve Anesti Arapi was deemed too inexperienced. Lekbello became an instant hero as Flamurtari was only beaten on away goals by the Spanish giants. He returned to Lokomotiva and was suddenly lured back, somewhat overweight, to join Partizani when Musta left for Romania in 1991.

=== Cult hero status ===
He became something of a cult hero again at Feyenoord when he kept the Rotterdam club at bay for a long period in a 1991–92 European Cup Winners' Cup game, only to concede a late goal to lose and for Partizani to go out 0–1 on aggregate.

== International career ==
Lekbello made his debut for Albania in an October 1987 European Championship qualification match against Romania and earned his second and final cap against Spain in the same year.

== Personal life ==
Lekbello has two daughters and has been working for the Civil Emergency Office in Durrës County after his football career. He had also coached youth teams at Teuta. In 2016 he was goalkeeper coach with the Albania U19s.

== Honours ==
- Albanian Superliga: 4

1979, 1981, 1985, 1989

- Albanian Cup: 2

1980, 1986
