= Ilir Lame =

Albanian footballer

Personal information
- Date of birth: 11 October 1956 (age 70)

International career
Years	Team	Apps	(Gls)
1980–1984	Albania	11	(0)

Ilir Lame (born 11 October 1956) is an Albanian footballer. He played in eleven matches for the Albania national football team from 1980 to 1984.
