= Rifat Ibërshimi =

Albanian footballer

Personal information
- Date of birth: 29 October 1950 (age 75)

International career
| Years | Team | Apps | (Gls) |
| 1972–1976 | Albania | 7 | (0) |

Rifat Ibërshimi (born 29 October 1950) is an Albanian footballer. He played in seven matches for the Albania national football team from 1972 to 1976.
