= Milto Gurma =

Albanian footballer

Personal information
- Date of birth: 7 August 1951 (age 75)

International career
Years	Team	Apps	(Gls)
1972–1976	Albania	5	(0)

Milto Gurma (born 7 August 1951) is an Albanian footballer. He played in five matches for the Albania national football team from 1972 to 1976.
