= Aleksandër Vasi =

Albanian footballer

Personal information
- Date of birth: 13 April 1968 (age 58)

International career
Years	Team	Apps	(Gls)
1992	Albania	3	(0)

Aleksandër Vasi (born 13 April 1968) is an Albanian footballer. He played in three matches for the Albania national football team in 1992.
