= Artan Pali =

Albanian footballer

Personal information
- Date of birth: 18 March 1973 (age 53)
- Position: Defender

Senior career*
Years	Team	Apps	(Gls)
1991–1993	KF Tirana		
1994–1995	VfL 93 Hamburg		
1996–1998	SpVg Aurich		
2000–2002	Concordia Ihrhove		
2002–2006	BV Cloppenburg		

International career
1992–1995	Albania	3	(0)
- * Club domestic league appearances and goals

Artan Pali (born 18 March 1973) is an Albanian former footballer who played as a defender. He made three appearances for the Albania national team from 1992 to 1995.
