= Koço Dinella =

Albanian footballer

- Dinella with 17 Nëntori in 1970

Personal information
- Date of birth: 23 April 1947 (age 79)
- Position: Goalkeeper

International career
Years	Team	Apps	(Gls)
1967–1973	Albania	8	(0)

Koço Dinella (born 23 April 1947) is an Albanian footballer. He played in eight matches for the Albania national football team from 1967 to 1973.
