= Halim Mersini =

Albanian footballer

Personal information
- Full name: Halim Mersini
- Date of birth: 22 September 1961 (age 65)
- Place of birth: Vlorë, Albania
- Position: Goalkeeper

Senior career*
Years	Team	Apps	(Gls)
1978–1983	Shkëndija Tiranë		
1983–1990	17 Nëntori Tirana		

International career
1982–1986	Albania U21	20	(0)
1988–1989	Albania	6	(0)

Managerial career
- 2010–: Kamza (goalkeeping)
- –2013: Tërbuni (goalkeeping)
- * Club domestic league appearances and goals

Halim Mersini (born 22 September 1961 in Vlorë) is an Albanian retired football goalkeeper who played for the Albania national team.

== Club career ==
Mersini played for Shkëndija Tiranë, but as an international player had to move to 17 Nëntori Tirana when Shkëndija was relegated and won three league titles with Nëntori.

== International career ==
He made his debut for Albania in an August 1988 friendly match at home against Cuba and earned a total of 6 caps, scoring no goals. His final international was an October 1989 FIFA World Cup qualification match against Sweden.

== Personal life ==
He coached a Kosovar team in Sweden after leaving Albania in the early 1990s and later lived in Bulgaria for 3 years as well as 12 years in Argentina. He returned to Albania in 2010.

== Honours ==
- Kategoria Superiore (3): 1985, 1988, 1989
- Kupa e Shqipërisë (2): 1984, 1986
