= Gjergji Dëma =

Albanian footballer

Personal information
- Full name: Gjergji Dëma
- Date of birth: 7 August 1971 (age 55)
- Place of birth: Vlorë, Albania
- Height: 1.83 m (6 ft 0 in)
- Position: Defender

Senior career*
Years	Team	Apps	(Gls)
1987–1994	Flamurtari		
1994–1995	Svoboda Ljubljana	11	(4)
1995–1997	Rudar Velenje	28	(2)
1997–1998	Vevče Ljubljana	11	(1)
1998–1999	Beltinci	10	(0)
1999–2000	Dravograd	22	(0)
2000–2005	NK Ljubljana	106	(6)
2005–2007	Radomlje		
2007–2008	NK Ljubljana		

International career
1990–1997	Albania	10	(0)
- * Club domestic league appearances and goals

Gjergji Dëma (born 7 August 1971) is a retired Albanian international football player.

== Club career ==
Dema spent his Albanian career with Flamurtari in the 1980s and 1990s, winning a league title in a team featuring fellow international players Eqerem Memushi, Kreshnik Çipi, Rrapo Taho, Sokol Kushta and Agim Bubeqi.

== International career ==
He made his debut for Albania in a December 1990 European Championship qualification defeat by Spain and earned a total of 10 caps, scoring no goals. His final international was a March 1997 FIFA World Cup qualification match against Ukraine.

== Career statistics ==
=== International ===
Appearances and goals by national team and year
National team	Year	Apps	Goals
Albania	1990	1	0
Albania	1991	1	0
Albania	1992	–	
Albania	1993	1	0
Albania	1994	3	0
Albania	1995	2	0
Albania	1996	1	0
Albania	1997	1	0
Total		10	0

== Honours ==
- Albanian Superliga: 1

1991

== External sources ==
- Gjergji Dëma at National-Football-Teams.com
- Gjergji Dëma on Playerhistory.com
