= Niko Xhaçka =

Albanian footballer

Personal information
- Date of birth: 12 January 1944 (age 82)

International career
| Years | Team | Apps | (Gls) |
| 1965–1967 | Albania | 3 | (0) |

Niko Xhaçka (born 12 January 1944) is an Albanian footballer. He played in three matches for the Albania national football team from 1965 to 1967.
