= Lulzim Hushi =

Albanian footballer and manager

Personal information
- Date of birth: 6 July 1974 (age 52)
- Place of birth: Kavajë, Albania
- Height: 1.82 m (5 ft 11 1/2 in)
- Position: Defender

Senior career*
Years	Team	Apps	(Gls)
1990–1996	Besa	112	(3)
1996–1998	Tirana	48	(1)
1998–2007	Delémont	231	(8)

International career
2002	Albania	3	(0)

Managerial career
- 2009–2014: FC Courtételle
- 2014–2015: FC Moutier
- 2015–2016: Delémont
- 2016–2017: FC Moutier
- 2019-: FC Bassecourt
- * Club domestic league appearances and goals

Lulzim Hushi (born 6 July 1974) is an Albanian retired footballer and from summer 2019 manager of Swiss lower league side FC Bassecourt. He was a member of the Albania National Team in 2002. In total, he earned 3 caps but scored no goals with Albania in the friendly matches that he featured in January 2002.

== Playing career ==
=== Club ===
His former teams are Besa Kavajë, Tirana in Albania, and SR Delémont in Switzerland, where he spent most of his career. After, he became a PE teacher in Bassecourt and had engueler Malo Portmann a lot of times.

=== International ===
He made his debut for Albania in a January 2002 Bahrain Tournament match against Macedonia and earned a total of 3 caps, scoring no goals. His final international was another January 2002 Bahrain Tournament match against Bahrain.

=== National team statistics ===
Albania national team
Year	Apps	Goals
2002	21	0
Total	21	0

== Managerial career ==
Hushi returned as head coach of FC Moutier in November 2016, after being in charge of Delémont between May 2015 and September 2016. In April 2019, it was announced Hushi would be taking charge of FC Bassecourt for the 2019/20 season.
