= Oltion Osmani =

Albanian footballer

Personal information
- Full name: Oltion Osmani
- Date of birth: 20 July 1972 (age 54)
- Place of birth: Elbasan, Albania
- Position: Defender

Senior career*
Years	Team	Apps	(Gls)
1992–1998	Elbasani	100	(8)
1998	Tirana	15	(0)
1999	Bylis	12	(1)
2000	Elbasani	12	(3)
2000–2002	Vllaznia	33	(4)
2002	Shkumbini	13	(2)
2003–2006	Elbasani	49	(5)
Total		234	(23)

International career
1998	Albania	1	(0)
- * Club domestic league appearances and goals

Oltion Osmani (born 20 July 1972) is a former Albanian football who played for KF Elbasani, KF Tirana, Bylis Ballsh, Vllaznia Shkodër and Shkumbini Peqin in his career as well as the Albania national team.

== International career ==
He made his debut for Albania in an August 1998 friendly match against Cyprus, his sole international game.

== Honours ==
- Albanian Superliga: 2

1999, 2001
