= Foto Andoni =

Albanian footballer

Personal information
- Date of birth: 7 January 1946 (age 80)
- Position: Forward

International career
Years	Team	Apps	(Gls)
1965–1967	Albania	2	(0)

Foto Andoni (born 7 January 1946) is an Albanian footballer. He played in two matches for the Albania national football team from 1965 to 1967.
