= Lorenç Vorfi =

Albanian footballer

Lorenc Vorfi
Personal information
- Date of birth: 24 January 1940 (age 86)

International career
Years	Team	Apps	(Gls)
1963–1967	Albania	0	(0)

Lorenc Vorfi (born 24 January 1940) is an Albanian footballer. He played in five matches for the Albania national football team from 1963 to 1967.
