= Kristaq Eksarko =

Albanian footballer (1959–2025)

Personal information
- Date of birth: 29 November 1959
- Date of death: 29 December 2025 (aged 66)
- Position: Midfielder

Senior career*
| Years | Team | Apps | (Gls) |
| 1980–1986 | Partizani Tirana | | |

International career
| 1983–1984 | Albania | 4 | (0) |
- * Club domestic league appearances and goals

Kristaq Eksarko (29 November 1959 – 29 December 2025) was an Albanian footballer who played as a midfielder. He made four appearances for the Albania national team from 1983 to 1984.

Eksarko died on 29 December 2025, at the age of 66. He had been paralysed for over 19 years.
