= Bujar Çani =

Albanian footballer

Personal information
- Date of birth: 7 October 1946
- Date of death: 17 September 2012 (aged 65)
- Position: Defender

International career
Years	Team	Apps	(Gls)
1970–1972	Albania	9	(0)

Bujar Çani (7 October 1946 – 17 September 2012) was an Albanian footballer. He played in nine matches for the Albania national football team from 1970 to 1972.
