= Frederik Jorgaqi =

Albanian footballer

Personal information
- Date of birth: 1942 (age 83–84)

International career
Years	Team	Apps	(Gls)
1965–1967	Albania	2	(0)

Frederik Jorgaqi (born 1942) is an Albanian footballer. He played in two matches for the Albania national football team from 1965 to 1967.
