= Arjan Bimo =

Albanian footballer

Personal information
- Full name: Arjan Bimo
- Date of birth: 1 January 1959 (age 67)
- Place of birth: Tirana, Albania
- Height: 1.75 m (5 ft 9 in)
- Position: Leftback

Senior career*
Years	Team	Apps	(Gls)
1978–1986	17 Nëntori Tiranë		

International career
1982–1985	Albania	6	(0)
- * Club domestic league appearances and goals

Arjan Bimo (born 1 January 1959) is a former Albanian football player.

== Club career ==
He played for 17 Nëntori Tiranë (now KF Tirana) alongside Albanian greats Agustin Kola and Arben Minga during the 1980s and won 2 league titles with them.

== International career ==
He made his debut for Albania in an October 1982 European Championship qualification match away against Turkey and earned a total of 6 caps, scoring no goals. His final international was an October 1985 FIFA World Cup qualification match against Greece.

== Honours ==
- Kategoria Superiore: 2

1982, 1985
