= Skënder Begeja =

Albanian footballer

Personal information
- Full name: Skënder Begeja
- Date of birth: 5 February 1924
- Place of birth: Tirana, Albania
- Date of death: 3 October 2010 (aged 86)
- Position: Forward

Senior career*
Years	Team	Apps	(Gls)
1942–1944	Shprefeja		
1945–1947	SK Tirana		
1948–1950	Akademik Sofia		
1952–1958	Dinamo Tirana		

International career
1947	Albania	4	(0)
- * Club domestic league appearances and goals

Skënder Begeja (5 February 1924 - 3 October 2010) was a former Albanian football forward. He made four appearances for the Albania national team.

== Club career ==
Begeja studied at the Qemal Stafa High School, in Tirana, Albania. He was the first Albanian athlete to run the 100 meters under 11 seconds.

During his football career Begeja played for Shprefeja (1942–1945), Bulgarian Akademik Sofia (1948–50) and Dinamo Tirana (1952–58).

== International career ==
He made his debut for Albania in a May 1947 Balkan Cup match against Romania and earned a total of 4 caps, scoring no goals. His final international was a September 1947 Balkan Cup match against Yugoslavia.

== Personal life and death ==
After retiring as a player in 1958, Begeja worked as a reserve team coach with Dinamo and was deputy to head coach Skënder Jareci. He also worked for the FSHF and the Albanian Olympic committee. He died on 3 October 2010, aged 86.

== Honours ==
=== Dinamo Tirana ===
- Kategoria Superiore (6): 1950, 1951, 1952, 1953, 1955, 1956.
- Kupa e Shqipërisë (3): 1952, 1953, 1954.
