= 1969–70 Albanian National Championship =

Albanian National Championship
- Season: 1969–70
- Champions: 17 Nëntori; 10th Albanian title
- Relegated: Tekstilisti; Naftëtari
- European Cup: 17 Nëntori
- Cup Winners' Cup: Partizani
- Matches: 182
- Goals: 407 (2.24 per match)
- Top goalscorer: Panajot Pano (17 goals)

The 1969–70 Albanian National Championship was the 31st season of the Albanian National Championship, the top professional league for association football clubs, since its establishment in 1930.

== Overview ==
It was contested by 14 teams, and 17 Nëntori won the championship.

== League table ==
Pos	Team	Pld	W	D	L	GF	GA	GR	Pts	Qualification or relegation
1	17 Nëntori (C)	26	19	6	1	56	10	5.600	44	Qualification for the European Cup first round
2	Partizani	26	14	10	2	51	19	2.684	38	Qualification for the Cup Winners' Cup preliminary round
3	Vllaznia	26	13	9	4	34	10	3.400	35	
4	Dinamo Tirana	26	14	7	5	38	23	1.652	35	
5	Besa	26	10	12	4	32	19	1.684	32	
6	Labinoti	26	10	7	9	30	25	1.200	27	
7	Skënderbeu	26	7	13	6	21	20	1.050	27	
8	Traktori	26	8	11	7	23	27	0.852	27	
9	Flamurtari	26	7	9	10	26	25	1.040	23	
10	Lokomotiva Durrës	26	5	10	11	17	28	0.607	20	
11	Luftëtari	26	5	8	13	22	41	0.537	18	
12	Apolonia	26	5	7	14	24	42	0.571	17	
13	Tekstilisti (R)	26	3	8	15	24	44	0.545	14	Relegation to the 1970–71 Kategoria e Dytë
14	Naftëtari (R)	26	2	3	21	9	74	0.122	7	Relegation to the 1970–71 Kategoria e Dytë

Source: RSSSF.org
(C) Champions; (R) Relegated

Note: '17 Nëntori' is Tirana, 'Labinoti' is Elbasani, 'Traktori' is Lushnja, 'Lokomotiva Durrës' is Teuta

== Results ==
Home \ Away	17N	APO	BES	DIN	FLA	LAB	LOK	LUF	NAF	PAR	SKË	TEK	TRA	VLL
17 Nëntori		3–0	2–0	3–0	4–0	3–1	2–0	5–0	6–0	0–0	1–1	3–0	3–0	1–1
Apolonia	1–2		1–0	1–2	1–0	2–1	2–1	2–1	2–1	1–3	1–1	2–3	1–1	0–1
Besa	0–0	2–0		1–0	0–0	3–2	1–1	5–0	2–0	3–3	1–0	1–0	1–1	1–2
Dinamo	2–3	2–0	1–1		1–0	1–1	1–0	3–1	4–1	1–1	3–2	1–0	3–0	0–0
Flamurtari	0–1	2–0	1–1	0–1		1–2	1–0	2–0	6–0	1–2	0–0	3–2	2–0	0–0
Labinoti	1–2	1–1	0–2	2–2	1–0		3–0	1–0	3–0	1–1	1–0	2–0	0–0	1–0
Lokomotiva	0–1	1–1	0–0	0–2	0–0	2–0		2–1	5–1	1–3	1–1	1–0	0–0	1–0
Luftëtari	0–1	2–0	1–1	1–1	2–1	3–2	0–0		4–0	0–0	1–0	1–1	0–1	1–0
Naftëtari	0–5	2–1	0–1	0–3	0–0	0–1	0–2	2–0		1–6	0–1	1–2	0–2	0–0
Partizani	1–1	3–0	1–1	2–0	4–2	1–0	3–0	1–0	6–0		1–0	4–0	1–1	0–0
Skënderbeu	1–0	1–0	1–1	0–0	0–0	1–0	1–1	0–0	2–0	1–0		0–0	2–1	0–0
Tekstilisti	1–3	4–2	1–3	1–2	1–1	1–2	0–0	2–2	0–0	1–2	2–2		0–1	1–1
Traktori	0–1	1–1	0–0	0–1	2–1	0–0	0–0	2–1	2–0	1–1	3–3	3–1		1–0
Vllaznia	0–0	1–0	1–0	2–1	2–1	0–0	2–0	4–0	8–0	2–1	2–0	1–0	4–0	

Source: CalcioMondialeWeb.it
Legend: Blue = home team win; Yellow = draw; Red = away team win.
