= Zihni Gjinali =

Albanian footballer (1926–2005)

Personal information
- Date of birth: 5 May 1926
- Place of birth: Tirana, Albania
- Date of death: 19 July 2005 (aged 79)
- Position: Striker

Senior career*
| Years | Team | Apps | (Gls) |
- Besa
| 1947–1949 | Partizani | | |
| 1950-1956 | Dinamo Tirana | | |

International career
| 1948-1952 | Albania | 12 | (3) |

Managerial career
- 1949-1956: Dinamo Tirana
- 1971-1973: Apolonia
- 1976: Traktori Lushnja
- 1994: Besa
- * Club domestic league appearances and goals

Zihni Gjinali (5 May 1926 – 19 July 2005) was an Albanian footballer who played his professional career for Besa, Dinamo Tirana and Partizani Tirana football clubs. He was the captain and head coach of the Dinamo Dynasty of the 1950s. Gjinali was also a successful forward with the Albania national football team.

== International career ==
He made his debut for Albania in a May 1948 Balkan Cup match against Hungary and earned a total of 12 caps, scoring 3 goals. His final international was a December 1952 friendly match against Czechoslovakia.

== Managerial career ==
During his spell at Dinamo, Gjinali acted as player coach. He later worked at Apolonia and Besa and was coach of Traktori Lushnja for several years.
