= Vladimir Balluku =

Albanian footballer

Personal information
- Date of birth: 7 October 1951 (age 75)
- Position: Midfielder

International career
Years	Team	Apps	(Gls)
1971–1972	Albania	2	(0)

Vladimir Balluku (born 7 October 1951) is an Albanian footballer. He played in two matches for the Albania national football team from 1971 to 1972.
