= Kujtim Çoçoli =

Albanian footballer

Personal information
- Date of birth: 12 September 1952 (age 74)
- Position: Defender

International career
Years	Team	Apps	(Gls)
1981	Albania	3	(0)

Kujtim Çoçoli (born 12 September 1952) is an Albanian footballer. He played in three matches for the Albania national football team in 1981.
