= Frederik Gjinali =

Albanian footballer (born 1942)

Personal information
- Date of birth: 29 July 1942 (age 84)
- Place of birth: Tirana, Albania
- Height: 1.76 m (5 ft 9 in)
- Position: Defender

Youth career
- 196x–1966: Dinamo Tirana

Senior career*
Years	Team	Apps	(Gls)
1966–1975	Dinamo Tirana		

International career^{‡}
1967	Albania	1	(0)
- * Club domestic league appearances and goals as of 8 October 2017 ‡ National team caps and goals as of 8 October 2017

Frederik Gjinali (born 29 July 1942) is an Albanian former footballer who played as a defender. He is a one-club man, having spent his 9-year career at Dinamo Tirana, winning three championships and two Albanian Cups.

== International career ==
Gjinali has also been a former Albania international, playing one match in 1967. He was part of squad that played in the qualifiers of UEFA Euro 1968. He made his competitive debut on 17 December 1967 in the preliminary round against West Germany where he had a goal disallowed for allegedly offside as the match finished in a goalless draw. Albania eventually finished last in Group 4.

=== International statistics ===
National team	Year	Apps	Goals
Albania
Albania	1967	1	0
Total		1	0

== Honours ==
- Albanian Superliga: 1

1967, 1973, 1975
