= Kujtim Majaci =

Albanian footballer

Personal information
- Full name: Kujtim Majaci
- Date of birth: 20 March 1962
- Place of birth: Fier, Albania
- Date of death: 14 July 2009 (aged 47)
- Place of death: Fier, Albania
- Height: 1.76 m (5 ft 9 in)
- Position: Striker

Youth career
- 1976–1980: Apolonia Fier

Senior career*
Years	Team	Apps	(Gls)
1980–1992	Apolonia Fier	300	(174)

International career
- Albania U-21
1989–1990	Albania	3	(0)
- * Club domestic league appearances and goals

Kujtim Majaci (20 March 1962 - 14 July 2009) was an Albanian football player.

== Club career ==
He played for Apolonia Fier for his entire career, playing around 300 league games and scoring 174 goals, making him the club's highest goalscorer. He was also a member of the Albania national team, earning 3 senior caps.

== International career ==
Majaci made his debut for Albania in a January 1989 friendly match against Greece and has earned a total of 3 caps, scoring no goals.

His final international was a November 1990 UEFA Euro 1992 qualification match against France.

== Death ==
He died of a heart attack in July 2009, aged 47, after collapsing on Seman Beach near Fier. In his honour, a statue was erected in Fier.
