= 2000 Malta International Football Tournament =

Tournament details
- Host country: Malta
- Dates: 6–10 February
- Teams: 4
- Venue(s): 1 (in 1 host city)

Final positions
- Champions: Albania (1st title)
- Runners-up: Malta
- Third place: Andorra
- Fourth place: Azerbaijan

Tournament statistics
- Matches played: 6
- Goals scored: 10 (1.67 per match)
- Attendance: 16,381 (2,730 per match)
- Top scorer(s): (Malta) Gilbert Agius (2 goals)

The 2000 Malta International Tournament (known as the Rothmans Tournament for sponsorship reasons) was the tenth edition of the Malta International Tournament. The tournament, held between 6 February and 10 February 2000, was contested by Malta, Albania, Andorra and Azerbaijan.

== Matches ==
| Pos | Team | Pld | W | D | L | GF | GA | GD | Pts |
|---|---|---|---|---|---|---|---|---|---|
| 1 | Albania (C) | 3 | 3 | 0 | 0 | 5 | 0 | +5 | 9 |
| 2 | Malta (H) | 3 | 1 | 1 | 1 | 4 | 2 | +2 | 4 |
| 3 | Andorra | 3 | 0 | 2 | 1 | 1 | 4 | −3 | 2 |
| 4 | Azerbaijan | 3 | 0 | 1 | 2 | 0 | 4 | −4 | 1 |

Source: RSSSF
(C) Champions; (H) Hosts
6 February 2000

| Albania | 3–0 | Andorra |
|---|---|---|
| Dalipi 63' (pen.); Vata 86'; Zajmi 90' | Report |

National Stadium, Ta' Qali
Attendance: 2,500
Referee: Joseph Attard (Malta)

6 February 2000

| Malta | 3–0 | Azerbaijan |
|---|---|---|
| Buttigieg 31'; Agius 53', 90' (pen.) | Report |

National Stadium, Ta' Qali
Attendance: 2,603
Referee: Bujar Pregia (Albania)

8 February 2000

| Albania | 1–0 | Azerbaijan |
|---|---|---|
| Murati 37' | Report |

National Stadium, Ta' Qali
Attendance: 3,000
Referee: Emanuel Zammit (Malta)

8 February 2000

| Malta | 1–1 | Andorra |
|---|---|---|
| Mallia 15' | Report | Sonejee 2' |

National Stadium, Ta' Qali
Attendance: 2,624
Referee: Bujar Pregia (Albania)

10 February 2000

| Andorra | 0–0 | Azerbaijan |
|---|---|---|
| | Report |

National Stadium, Ta' Qali
Attendance: 2,000
Referee: Lawrence Sammut (Malta)

10 February 2000

| Malta | 0–1 | Albania |
|---|---|---|
| | Report | Sinani 54' |

National Stadium, Ta' Qali
Attendance: 3,654
Referee: Xaqani Məmmədov (Azerbaijan)

== Winner ==
2000 Malta Tournament winner

Albania
First title

== Statistics ==
=== Goalscorers ===
There were 10 goals scored in 6 matches, for an average of 1.67 goals per match.

2 goals

- (Malta) Gilbert Agius

1 goal

- (Albania) Edmond Dalipi
- (Albania) Edvin Murati
- (Albania) Vioresin Sinani
- (Albania) Rudi Vata
- (Albania) Roland Zajmi
- (Malta) John Buttigieg
- (Malta) George Mallia
- (Andorra) Óscar Sonejee

== See also ==
China Cup
Cyprus International Football Tournament
