= Albania national football team records and statistics =

Statistical records of the Albania national football team

This article details the competitive records and statistics of the Albania national football team.

Statistics are updated after each official match and are correct as of 12 November 2026.

== Honours and achievements ==
Major

- UEFA European Championship
  - Group stage: 2016, 2024

Regional

- Balkan Cup
  - Winners: 1946
  - Fifth place: 1947, 1948

Minor

- Malta (Rothmans) International Tournament
  - Winners: 2000
  - Third place: 1998

== Individual records ==
=== Appearances ===
Most appearances

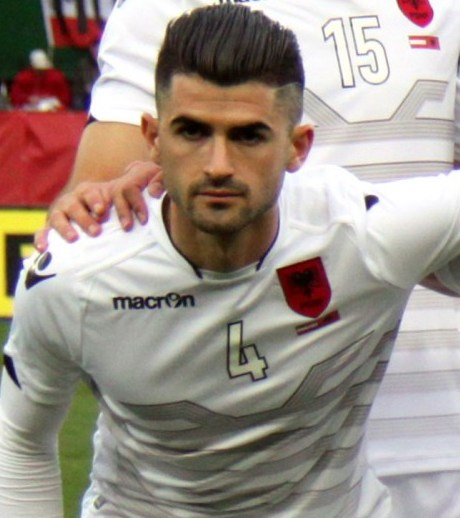
Elseid Hysaj is Albania's most capped player, with 105 appearances.

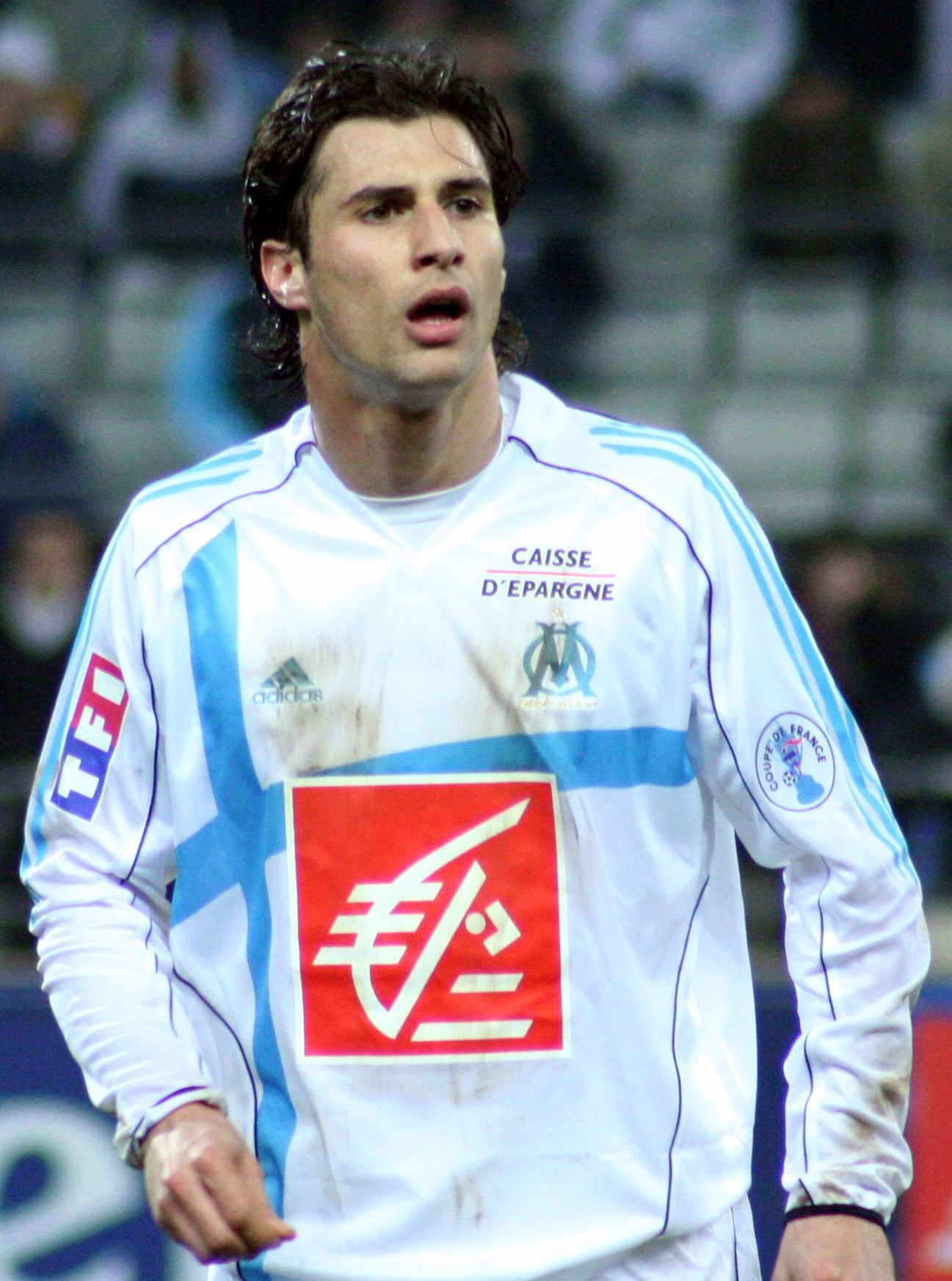
Lorik Cana is Albania's second most capped player, with 93 appearances.

As of 15 November 2026

No.	Pos.	Name	National team career	Caps	Goals	Honours and achievements
1	DF	Elseid Hysaj*	2013–	105	2	UEFA Euro 2016 squad UEFA Euro 2024 squad
2	DF	Lorik Cana	2003–2016	93	1	UEFA Euro 2016 squad
3	GK	Etrit Berisha*	2012–	85	0	UEFA Euro 2016 squad UEFA Euro 2024 squad
4	MF	Altin Lala	1998–2011	79	3	
=	DF	Berat Gjimshiti*	2015–	79	1	UEFA Euro 2024 squad
6	MF	Klodian Duro	2001–2011	77	6	
7	FW	Erjon Bogdani	1996–2013	75	18	
=	MF	Ervin Skela	2000–2011	75	13	2000 Rothmans (gold)
9	GK	Foto Strakosha	1990–2005	73	0	
=	DF	Ansi Agolli	2005–2017	73	3	UEFA Euro 2016 squad

	Key
*	Still active for the national team (Note: Players who are still active for the national team are players who have not retired from international football and are, subsequently, eligible to be called up.)
=	Player is tied for the number of caps

First player to reach 100 appearances
Elseid Hysaj, 6 June 2026, 0–1 vs. Luxembourg

Fastest to reach 100 appearances
Elseid Hysaj, 13 years and 4 months (6 February 2013 – 6 June 2026)

Youngest to reach 100 appearances
Elseid Hysaj, 32 years, 4 months and 4 days (6 June 2026, vs. Luxembourg)

Longest Albania career span (Note: Career span is measured from first inclusion in an international matchday squad to his final squad inclusion.)
Orges Shehi, 18 years, 9 months and 6 days (5 September 1998 – 11 June 2017) (Note: Although he did not make his senior debut until 2010, Shehi made only sporadic appearances in Albania squads beforehand, largely serving as a reserve goalkeeper, and earned relatively few caps overall.)

Longest Albania career length (Note: Career length is measured from a player's first appearance to their last appearance for Albania. Unlike career span, it is based solely on playing appearances rather than squad selections.)
Erjon Bogdani, 16 years, 11 months and 2 days (24 April 1996 – 26 March 2013)

Oldest player (Note: Indicates the player's age at their last match.)
Foto Strakosha, 39 years 10 months 17 days, 9 February 2005, 0–2 vs. Ukraine

Youngest player
Ramën Çepele, 17 years 7 months 21 days, 11 November 2020, 0–2 vs. Kosovo

Most consecutive Albania matches played
Etrit Berisha, 41 (16 October 2012 – 12 November 2016)
Kristjan Asllani, 28 (16 November 2022 – 10 June 2025)
Ervin Skela, 26 (11 October 2003 – 11 October 2006)
Elseid Hysaj, 24 (29 May 2016 – 10 September 2018)
Nedim Bajrami, 23 (27 March 2023 – 21 March 2025)
Mario Mitaj, 21 (17 June 2023 – 19 November 2024)
Arbër Hoxha, 20 (19 November 2024 – 15 November 2026)

Most consecutive Albania matches played (pre-2000 era)
Mirel Josa, 19 (17 October 1984 – 8 March 1989)

Most appearances as a substitute
Odise Roshi, 32
Jahmir Hyka, 28
Bekim Balaj, 28
Edmond Kapllani, 24
Alban Bushi, 23
Devi Muka, 23
Myrto Uzuni, 23

Most appearances in competitive matches (World Cup, European Championship, Nations League and qualifiers)
Elseid Hysaj (2013–2026), 71

Most appearances in FIFA World Cup qualifiers
Ervin Skela & Lorik Cana, 28 each

Most appearances at the UEFA European Championship
Elseid Hysaj & Arlind Ajeti, 5 each

Most appearances at the UEFA European Championship qualifying
Foto Strakosha & Altin Lala, 29 each

Most appearances in UEFA European Championship and UEFA European Championship qualifying combined
Lorik Cana, 29

Most UEFA European Championship squads
Elseid Hysaj, Arlind Ajeti, Etrit Berisha, Amir Abrashi & Naser Aliji – 2 each (2016 & 2024)

Most minutes played at the UEFA European Championship
Elseid Hysaj, 450 minutes
Arlind Ajeti, 445 minutes

Most UEFA European Championship tournaments played in
Elseid Hysaj & Arlind Ajeti, 2 each

Most consecutive starts at the UEFA European Championship
Elseid Hysaj & Arlind Ajeti, 5 each

Most appearances as a substitute at the UEFA European Championship
Arbër Hoxha, 3

Most UEFA European Championship matches won
14 players, all 1

Most UEFA European Championship points won
Elseid Hysaj and Arlind Ajeti, 4 points (Note: Hysaj and Ajeti both appeared in the two UEFA European Championship matches in which Albania earned points: a 1–0 victory over Romania on 19 June 2016 and a 2–2 draw with Croatia on 19 June 2024.)

Oldest player named in a UEFA European Championship matchday squad
Orges Shehi, 38 years 8 months 24 days, 19 June 2016, 1–0 vs. Romania

Oldest player to play at the UEFA European Championship
Klaus Gjasula, 34 years 6 months 5 days, 19 June 2024, 2–2 vs. Croatia

Youngest player to play at the UEFA European Championship
Medon Berisha, 20 years 238 days, 15 June 2024, 1–2 vs. Italy

Most selections without playing at the UEFA European Championship finals
Naser Aliji, 2 (2016 and 2024)

Diverse players with many appearances who have not played in a major tournament
Altin Lala, 79 (1998–2011). Played 51 matches across FIFA World Cup qualification and UEFA European Championship qualifying, but never qualified for a major tournament.

Ervin Bulku, 56 (2002–2014). Participated in Euro 2016 qualifying, but was not selected for the Euro 2016 final tournament squad. (Note: Ervin Bulku was regularly included in Albania squads during the Euro 2016 qualifying Group I campaign, including as an unused substitute against Armenia on 29 March 2015. Albania ultimately qualified for the tournament in France, but Bulku was not included in the final 27-man squad.)

Myrto Uzuni, 54 (2018–2026). Featured in Euro 2024 qualifying, but was not included in the final tournament squad. (Note: Myrto Uzuni appeared in six of Albania's eight Euro 2024 qualifying matches as a starter, but was not selected for the final tournament squad. He has continued to represent Albania in subsequent competitions, though without reaching another major tournament.)

Ardian Ismajli, 53 (2018–2026). Was included in Albania's Euro 2024 squad but did not make an appearance at the final tournament. (Note: Ardian Ismajli played in six of eight Euro 2024 qualifying matches and was included in the final tournament squad, where he remained an unused substitute. He has continued to represent Albania in subsequent competitions, though without reaching another major tournament.)

Hamdi Salihi, 50 (2006–2015). Made one appearance during Euro 2016 qualifying, but was not selected for the final tournament squad. (Note: Hamdi Salihi featured in most of Albania's Euro 2016 qualifying matches, making one substitute appearance against Armenia on 29 March 2015, but was ultimately not included in the final tournament squad.)

Jahmir Hyka, 47 (2007–2018). Featured in multiple qualification campaigns, but did not participate in Euro 2016 qualifying, during which Albania qualified for its first major tournament, and was not included in the final tournament squad. He later returned for the 2018 FIFA World Cup qualification, though Albania did not qualify. (Note: Jahmir Hyka made his debut during Euro 2008 qualifying and featured regularly in qualifying campaigns through 2014. He did not participate in Euro 2016 qualifying, in which Albania secured qualification for its first-ever major tournament, and was not selected for the final tournament squad. Hyka later returned during 2018 FIFA World Cup qualification, but Albania did not qualify for the finals.)

Marash Kumbulla, 27 (2019–2026). Was included in Albania's Euro 2024 squad but did not make an appearance at the final tournament. (Note: Marash Kumbulla made one appearance in Euro 2024 qualifying and was included in the final tournament squad, but did not play. He has continued to represent Albania in subsequent competitions, though without reaching another major tournament.)

Naser Aliji, 19 (2015–2025). Was included in the squads for Euro 2016 and Euro 2024 but did not make an appearance at either final tournament.

Most appearances in the UEFA Nations League
Ardian Ismajli, 19

Most appearances at the Balkan Cup
Loro Boriçi, Muhamet Dibra, Vasif Biçaku and Sllave Llambi – 11 each.

Most Balkan Cups played in
Loro Boriçi, Muhamet Dibra, Aristidh Parapani, Vasif Biçaku, Sllave Llambi, Rexhep Spahiu, Bahri Kavaja, Giacomo Poselli, Bimo Fakja, and Besim Fagu – 3 each

Most appearances at the Malta (Rothmans) International Tournament
Rudi Vata, 5

Most Malta (Rothmans) International Tournaments played in
Rudi Vata, Arjan Beqaj and Armir Grimaj – 2 each

Most appearances at the Summer Olympics qualifications
Panajot Pano, 4

Most appearances in a calendar year
13 in 2024 – Nedim Bajrami, Kristjan Asllani, Jasir Asani, Mario Mitaj & Qazim Laçi

Most consecutive years of appearances
Foto Strakosha, 16, 1990 to 2005 inclusive (Note: Strakosha appeared in at least one match in each of the years from 1990 to 2005. Erjon Bogdani represented Albania between 1996 and 2013 but had no appearances in 1997 (playing for under-21 and under-23 teams) and in 2004 (injured), resulting in nine consecutive years with at least one appearance.)

Most consecutive years of appearances for an outfield player
14 – Altin Rraklli, 1992 to 2005 inclusive, Altin Lala, 1998 to 2011 inclusive, Lorik Cana, 2003 to 2016 inclusive & Elseid Hysaj, 2013 to 2026 inclusive.

Most often teammates appearances
Etrit Berisha & Elseid Hysaj, 63 matches
Elseid Hysaj & Berat Gjimshiti, 60 matches
Ervin Skela & Klodian Duro, 58 matches

Oldest debutant
Orges Shehi, 33 years 1 month 28 days, 17 November 2010, 0–0 vs. Macedonia

Oldest debutant in a competitive match
Daniel Xhafaj, 30 years 2 months 29 days, 6 June 2007, 0–3 vs. Luxembourg

Most matches completed
Elseid Hysaj 82 (2013–2026)
Lorik Cana 80 (2003–2016)

Most matches as a starter
Elseid Hysaj – 94 (2013–2026)
Lorik Cana – 88 (2003–2016)

Most consecutive matches as a starter
Etrit Berisha, 83, 16 October 2012 vs Slovenia – 15 November 2026 vs. Belarus
Berat Djimsiti, 73, 29 March 2016 vs. Luxembourg – 15 November 2026 vs. Belarus
Rudi Vata, 58, 30 May 1990 vs Iceland – 6 June 2001 vs. Germany
Foto Strakosha, 56, 30 May 1990 vs Iceland – 2 April 2003 vs. Bulgaria

Most appearances all as a starter
Arjan Xhumba, 48 (1989–2003)
Thomas Strakosha, 47 (2017–2026)
Hysen Zmijani, 36 (1984–1995)
Artur Lekbello, 30 (1984–1995)
Perlat Musta, 23 (1981–1993)

Most appearances with every match completed
Panajot Pano, 28 (1963–1973)
Ramazan Rragami, 20 (1965–1973)

Most appearances with every match completed since 1988 (Note: Before 1988, substitutions in international football were generally permitted only in cases of injury. From 1988, the Laws of the Game allowed tactical substitutions (initially two per match), increasing the likelihood of players being replaced and reducing the number of matches completed.)
Fatbardh Jera, 15 (1985–1990)
Adnan Oçelli, 11 (1984–1993)

First player to debut as a substitute in the competitive era (post-1963)
Rifat Ibërshimi, 14 November 1971, 3–0 vs. Turkey

Most appearances as a substitute without ever starting a game
Enkeleid Dobi, 6 (30 November 1995 – 12 February 2003)

Most consecutive appearances without completing a full match
Jasir Asani, 16 (Note: Jasir Asani started and was substituted off in all 16 matches from his debut onwards.) (27 March 2023 – 7 September 2024)

Most appearances for an outfield player without ever scoring
Andi Lila, 70 (21 November 2007 – 2 November 2018)

Most appearances against the same opponent
Foto Strakosha, 8 vs. Greece

Most appearances against the same opponent by an outfield player
Igli Tare, 7 vs. Georgia
Elseid Hysaj, 7 vs. Israel
Berat Djimsiti, 6 vs. Israel
Jahmir Hyka, 5 vs. Macedonia
Taulant Seferi, 5 vs. Czech Republic
Elseid Hysaj, 5 vs. Poland
Myrto Uzuni, 5 vs. Poland

Most appearances without featuring in a competitive match (Note: Competitive matches include World Cup, European Championship, Nations League and their qualifying matches. Several players made appearances for Albania between 22 September 1946 and 1 May 1958, prior to its first competitive match in June 1963.)
Orges Shehi, 8 (17 November 2010 – 29 March 2016) (Note: All eight appearances were in friendly matches. For most of his international career, Orges Shehi served as understudy goalkeeper to Etrit Berisha during coach Gianni De Biasi's tenure, including at Euro 2016.)

Fewest appearances in total, having played at the European Championship finals (Note: This record is subject to change, as Medon Berisha remains active. Shkëlzen Gashi holds the record among retired players, with 17 appearances between 14 August 2013 and 5 September 2016. He was included in Albania's squad for UEFA Euro 2016 and made one appearance under coach Gianni De Biasi.)
Medon Berisha, 4 (3 June 2024 – 4 September 2025) – Was included in Albania's squad for UEFA Euro 2024 and made one appearance under coach Sylvinho.

Most appearances playing on a winning team
Elseid Hysaj, 44 (105 total appearances)

Most appearances playing on a team that ended in a draw
20 – Lorik Cana (93 appearances), Klodian Duro (77 appearances), Ansi Agolli (73 appearances) and Armend Dallku (64 appearances)

Most appearances on a team without ever taking a draw
Mehmet Dragusha, 11 (2003–2005)

Most appearances playing on a losing team
Elseid Hysaj, 45 (103 appearances)

Foto Strakosha, 43 (73 appearances)

Altin Lala, 41 (79 appearances)

Highest positive win–loss difference
Mario Mitaj, 19–12 (39 appearances)
Jahmir Hyka, 20–14 (47 appearances)

Highest positive goal difference (Note: Amir Abrashi holds the record among retired players with a goal difference of +11. The records of the other players listed remain subject to change.)
+20 – Mario Mitaj (51–31, 39 appearances)

Most appearances playing only in wins without conceding a goal
Roland Zajmi, 4 (1995–2000)

Most appearances without ever playing on a losing team
Arbnor Muja, 5 (2023–2024)

Most appearances without ever playing on a winning team
Fatbardh Jera, 15 (1985–1990)

Most appearances playing only in defeats
Agim Bubeqi, 6 (1987–1989)

Highest negative win–loss and goal difference by a player
Sulejman Demollari, 5–33, 27–93 (45 appearances)

Highest negative win–loss and goal difference by a player in the current millennium
Altin Rraklli, 12–38, 57–104 (63 appearances)

Appearances in three different decades
Blendi Nallbani – 1980s, 1990s, 2000s
Arjan Xhumba – 1980s, 1990s, 2000s
Erjon Bogdani – 1990s, 2000s, 2010s
Altin Lala – 1990s, 2000s, 2010s
Arjan Beqaj – 1990s, 2000s, 2010s

Most appearances at the former national stadium Qemal Stafa
Erjon Bogdani, 39
Lorik Cana, 37

Most appearances at provisional national stadiums (Note: Following the closure of Qemal Stafa Stadium in 2013, Albania played its home matches at Elbasan Arena and Loro Boriçi Stadium before moving permanently to Air Albania Stadium (originally Arena Kombëtare) in 2019.)
Etrit Berisha, 19 (13 at Elbasan Arena and 6 at Loro Boriçi Stadium)

Most appearances at the current national stadium Air Albania

Elseid Hysaj, 25
Ylber Ramadani, 25
Myrto Uzuni, 24
Kristjan Asllani, 22
Berat Gjimshiti, 21

Most appearances while representing the same club
Altin Lala, 75, while playing for Hannover 96

Most appearances while representing an Albanian club
Nevil Dede – 31 with Tirana

Most appearances while representing only one club
Nevil Dede of Tirana, Taulant Xhaka of Basel, Arbër Hoxha of Dinamo Zagreb, 31 each

First appearance by a player who had never played for an Albanian club
Altin Lala (Borussia Fulda), 21 January 1998, 4–1 vs. Turkey

Club providing the most players in a major tournament squad
2 – Basel (Note: The players in question were Taulant Xhaka & Naser Aliji) Nantes (Note: Lorik Cana & Ermir Lenjani), Rijeka (Note: Odise Roshi & Bekim Balaj) at UEFA Euro 2016 and Lecce (Note: Ylber Ramadani & Medon Berisha) at UEFA Euro 2024

Club providing the most Albania internationals in total
Partizani Tirana 98

Non-Albanian club providing the most Albania internationals in total
Lokomotiva Zagreb 8

Club providing the most players in a single match
Starting XI – Partizani Tirana – 9, 12 June 1971 vs. West Germany

Including substitutes – 17 Nëntori Tirana – 7, 30 October 1985 vs. Greece

Albanian clubs providing the most players in a single match under foreign managers (Note: Since the early 2000s, Albania has been managed exclusively by foreign coaches. During this period, the national team has predominantly consisted of players based abroad, while players from Albanian clubs have been selected less frequently, except in certain friendly matches.)
9 November 2022 vs. Qatar – Starting XI: 3, Partizani Tirana and Laçi; including substitutes: 5, Partizani Tirana.

Albanian club providing the most players in a single unofficial match under foreign managers
Partizani Tirana, 4, 26 October 2022 vs. Saudi Arabia.

Albanian club providing the most players in a single match with all other players based abroad
Skënderbeu Korçë, 3, 15 November 2013 vs. Belarus.

Non-Albanian club providing the most players in a single match
Starting XI: 3 – Eintracht Frankfurt, 6 September 2003 vs. Georgia – Kryvbas Kryvyi Rih, 3 March 2010 vs. Northern Ireland, 27 May 2010 vs. Montenegro & 2 June 2010 vs. Andorra – Basel, 11 October 2015 vs. Armenia – Empoli, 10 June 2022 vs. Israel

Including substitutes: 3 – Kryvbas Kryvyi Rih, 27 May 2008 vs. Poland, Zürich, 4 September 2015 vs. Denmark & 11 October 2015 vs. Armenia – Basel, 13 November 2015 vs. Kosovo

Major tournament: 2 – Nantes, Lorik Cana & Ermir Lenjani, 11 June 2016, 0–1 vs. Switzerland & Rijeka, Bekim Balaj & Odise Roshi, 19 June 2016, 1–0 vs. Romania – Lecce, Ylber Ramadani & Medon Berisha, 24 June 2024, 0–1 vs. Spain

Most clubs represented by one player in an Albania career
Klodian Duro (25 April 2001 – 7 October 2011) & Ervin Skela (15 August 2000 – 6 September 2011), 10 each

Most appearances while playing in a country's second division
Altin Rraklli, 34, 9 September 1992 – 18 February 2004, as part of SC Freiburg in the 1992–93 2. Bundesliga, Hertha BSC, SpVgg Unterhaching and SSV Jahn Regensburg in the 2. Bundesliga.
Ledian Memushaj, 29, 9 February 2011 – 28 March 2021, as part of Portogruaro, Carpi and Pescara in the Serie B.
Odise Roshi, 28, 15 August 2012 – 16 November 2022, as part of FSV Frankfurt in the 2. Bundesliga, Boluspor and Sakaryaspor in the TFF 1. Lig.
Edmond Kapllani, 27, 18 August 2004 – 8 June 2014, as part of Karlsruher SC, FC Augsburg, TuS Koblenz, SC Paderborn 07 and FSV Frankfurt in the 2. Bundesliga.
Adrian Aliaj, 23, 20 August 2003 – 11 October 2006, as part of Rot-Weiß Oberhausen in the 2. Bundesliga, Brest in the 2005–06 Ligue 2 and Solin in the 2006–07 Croatian Second Football League.
Ervin Skela, 23, 15 August 2000 – 12 October 2010, as part of Chemnitzer FC, SV Waldhof Mannheim, Eintracht Frankfurt and TuS Koblenz, all in the 2. Bundesliga.
Frédéric Veseli, 22, 6 October 2017 – 27 September 2022, as part of Empoli, Salernitana and Benevento in the Serie B.
Altin Lala, 21, 19 August 1998 – 17 April 2002, as part of Hannover 96 in the 2. Bundesliga.
Keidi Bare, 18, 7 September 2019 – 25 March 2024, as part of Málaga and Espanyol in the Segunda División.
Klaus Gjasula, 18, 4 September 2020 – 27 March 2023, as part of Hamburger SV in the 2020–21 2. Bundesliga and Darmstadt 98 in the 2021–22 2. Bundesliga and 2022–23 2. Bundesliga.
Qazim Laçi, 16, 7 September 2020 – 29 March 2022, as part of Ajaccio in the Ligue 2.
Rey Manaj, 16, 29 May 2018 – 17 November 2019, while playing for Granada and Albacete Balompié in the Segunda División and 26 September 2026 – 15 November 2026 as part of Sivasspor in the TFF 1. Lig.
Myrto Uzuni, 9, 24 September 2022 – 19 November 2024, as part of Granada in the Segunda División.
Arlind Ajeti, 7, 31 March 2021 – 3 June 2026, as part of Reggiana in the Serie B & Bodrum in the TFF 1. Lig.
Anis Mehmeti, 5, 27 March 2023 – 3 June 2026, as part of Bristol City and Ipswich Town in the EFL Championship.

Most appearances by a player from the second division of Albania
Arjan Xhumba, 1, 29 January 1992, vs. Greece, as part of Shqiponja Gjirokastër in the 1991–92 Kategoria e Dytë.

Most appearances by a player from 3 different non-top divisions of a country
Florian Myrtaj, 25, 5 January 2002 – 1 March 2006, as part of Teramo in the Serie D, Cesena in the Serie C, Verona and Catanzaro in the Serie B.

Most appearances by a player from a country's third division
Rey Manaj, 12 (4 September 2020 – 8 June 2021), while playing for Barcelona B (Note: Rey Manaj earned 12 caps and scored 3 goals for Albania while playing regularly for Barcelona B in the 2019–20 Segunda División B and 2020–21 Segunda División B. Although he was under contract with FC Barcelona, he did not make a first-team appearance during that period, apart from being an unused substitute in one 2019–20 La Liga match.) in the Segunda División B, the third tier of Spanish football
Ilir Shulku, 10 (19 August 1998 – 9 October 1999), while playing for Eintracht Nordhorn in the 1998–99 Regionalliga, the third tier of German football

Most appearances by a player from a country's fourth division
Florian Myrtaj, 4 (5 January 2002 – 17 April 2002), while playing for Teramo in the Serie D, the fourth tier of Italian football.
Ramën Çepele, 1 (11 November 2020), 0–2 vs. Kosovo, while playing for Hannover 96 II in the 2020–21 Regionalliga, the fourth tier of German football.

Most appearances by a player from a country's fifth division
Zamir Shpuza, 3 (29 March 1997 – 7 June 1997), while playing for SC Viktoria 06 Griesheim in the 1996–97 NRW-Liga, the fifth tier of German football.

Most appearances by a player from a youth team
Maldini Kacurri, 1, 4 September 2025, as part of Arsenal U-21 in the Professional Development League, youth league of English football.

Appearances under the most managers
10, Erjon Bogdani, (24 April 1996 – 26 March 2013), Neptun Bajko (1 app.), Astrit Hafizi (11), Medin Zhega (7), Sulejman Demollari (3), Giuseppe Dossena (2), Hans-Peter Briegel (13), Otto Barić (13), Slavko Kovačić (caretaker) (2), Arie Haan (6), Josip Kuže (16), Džemal Mustedanagić (caretaker) (2) and Gianni De Biasi (8). (Note: Two other players also appeared under eight full managers. Foto Strakosha (30 May 1990 – 9 February 2005), Agron Sulaj (1 app.), Bejkush Birçe (9), Neptun Bajko (12), Astrit Hafizi (21), Medin Zhega (11), Sulejman Demollari (1), Giuseppe Dossena (2) and Hans-Peter Briegel (20). Altin Lala (21 January 1998 – 11 October 2011), Astrit Hafizi (13 apps.), Medin Zhega (9), Sulejman Demollari (3), Giuseppe Dossena (2), Hans-Peter Briegel (23), Otto Barić (11), Arie Haan (8) and Josip Kuže (9), but under only one caretaker Slavko Kovačić (2). Instead, Arjan Beqaj (21 January 1998 – 10 August 2011) also participated in Albanian squads under ten different managers but did not earn a cap under Giuseppe Dossena; he earned caps under Astrit Hafizi (4), Medin Zhega (6), Sulejman Demollari (3), Hans-Peter Briegel (5), Otto Barić (11), Slavko Kovačić (caretaker) (2), Arie Haan (5), Josip Kuže (5) and Džemal Mustedanagić (caretaker) (2).) Altin Haxhi (30 November 1995 – 14 October 2009), Neptun Bajko (3), Astrit Hafizi (17), Medin Zhega (9), Sulejman Demollari (2), Giuseppe Dossena (2), Hans-Peter Briegel (22), Otto Barić (13) and Slavko Kovačić (caretaker) (1). (Note: Arjan Xhumba (15 November 1989 – 12 February 2003) also appeared under eight full managers, Shyqyri Rreli (1 app.), Bejkush Birçe (1), Neptun Bajko (12), Astrit Hafizi (16), Medin Zhega (10), Sulejman Demollari (4), Giuseppe Dossena (2) and Hans-Peter Briegel (1). He also participated in Albanian squads managed by Agron Sulaj but did not earn a cap.)

Most appearances under the same manager
Etrit Berisha, 43 (27 May 2012 – 16 November 2016), under Gianni De Biasi

Most appearances under the same manager by outfield players
39 – Andi Lila (29 February 2012 – 11 June 2017) and Odise Roshi (29 February 2012 – 11 June 2017), under Gianni De Biasi
38 – Ansi Agolli (29 February 2012 – 24 March 2017), under Gianni De Biasi

Most appearances under a single manager
Shkëlzen Gashi, 17 (14 August 2013 – 5 September 2016), under Gianni De Biasi
Edgar Çani, 16 (29 February 2012 – 12 November 2016), under Gianni De Biasi
Lorenc Trashi, 15 (14 October 2019 – 12 November 2021), under Edoardo Reja
Valdet Rama, 15 (26 March 2013 – 13 June 2015), under Gianni De Biasi

Longest gap between appearances
Sulejman Maliqati, 7 years 7 months 7 days (24 September 1950, 0–12 vs. Hungary – 1 May 1958, 1–1 vs. East Germany)
Iljaz Çeço, 5 years 11 months 19 days (25 October 1964, 0–2 vs. Netherlands – 14 October 1970, 0–3 vs. Poland)

Longest gap between appearances in the competitive era (post-1963)
Sefedin Braho, 6 years 10 months (3 November 1973, 1–4 vs. East Germany – 3 September 1980, 2–0 vs. Finland)

Tefik Osmani, 6 years 6 months 12 days (17 August 2005, 2–1 vs. Azerbaijan – 29 February 2012, 1–2 vs. Georgia) (Note: Osmani made six appearances in 2005 during World Cup qualification and returned in 2012, adding six other caps until 2013.)

Perlat Musta, 6 years 27 days (29 April 1987, 0–1 vs. Austria – 26 May 1993, 1–2 vs. Republic of Ireland)

Ervin Bulku, 4 years 9 months 21 days (17 April 2002, 0–2 vs. Andorra – 7 February 2007, 0–1 vs. Macedonia) (Note: Ervin Bulku made early appearances in 2002 and returned to the national team in 2007, continuing his international career in later years.)

Pair of brothers appearing in the same match
Haxhi Ballgjini and Shyqyri Ballgjini, 2 September 1981, 1–2 vs. Finland (Note: The first pair of brothers to appear in the same Albania match; both started and completed the game.)
Migjen Basha and Vullnet Basha, 14 August 2013, 2–0 vs. Armenia (Note: The second pair of brothers to appear in the same Albania match. Unlike the Ballgjini brothers, they did not play simultaneously, as Migjen was substituted before Vullnet entered the match.)

Relatives
Sllave Llambi (b. 1919) 19 caps, 1946–1950 & Pavllo Bukoviku (b. 1939) 5 caps, 1963–1965 – Uncle & nephew
Zyhdi Barbullushi (b. 1926) 1 cap, 1947 & Ardian Barbullushi (b. 1968) 2 caps, 1990–1992 – Log
Zihni Gjinali (b. 1926) 12 caps, 1948–1952 & Frederik Gjinali (b. 1942) 1 cap, 1967 – Log
Sabri Peqini (b. 1926) 3 caps, 1950–1952 & Kastriot Peqini (b. 1974) 11 caps, 1992–1993 – Log
Enver Ibërshimi (b. 1939) 1 cap, 1963 & Rifat Ibërshimi (b. 1950) 8 caps, 1971–1976 – Log
Artur "Tushe" Lekbello (b. 1966) 30 caps, 1987–1996 & Artur Shkëlqim Lekbello (b. 1958) 2 caps, 1987 – Cousins
Muhamet Vila (b. 1928) 3 caps, 1952–1953 & Arben Vila (b. 1961) 2 caps, 1984–1985 – Father & Son
Pavllo Bukoviku (b. 1939) 5 caps, 1963–1965 & Millan Baçi (b. 1955) 7 caps, 1976–1981 – Uncle & nephew
Panajot Pano (born 1939) 28 caps, 1963–1973 & Ledio Pano (born 1968) 9 caps, 1987–1996 – Father & Son
Ali Mema (b. 1943) 14 caps, 1963–1967 & Ardian Mema (b. 1971) 8 caps, 1995–1998 – Father & Son – Sulejman Mema (b. 1955) 1 cap, 1983 – Their nephew
Gani Xhafa (b. 1946) 4 caps, 1967–1973 & Erion Xhafa (b. 1982) 3 caps, 2006–2007 – Father & Son — Cousins with Uran Xhafa (b. 1951) 1 cap, 1981 & Fjodor Xhafa (b. 1977) 1 cap, 2002 – Father & Son
Agim Janku (b. 1949) 1 cap, 1971 & Mikel Janku (b. 1941) 9 caps, 1964–1967 – Brothers – Foto Janku (b. 1919) 1 cap, 1946 & Stivian Janku (b. 1997) 2 caps, 2022 – Log
Haxhi Ballgjini (b. 1958) 15 caps, 1976–1985 & Shyqyri Ballgjini (b. 1954) 2 caps, 1981 – Brothers
Kreshnik Çipi (b. 1960) 8 caps, 1980–1992 & Geri Çipi (b. 1976) 34 caps, 1995–2005 – "Uncle & nephew
Foto Strakosha (b. 1965) 73 caps, 1990–2004 & Thomas Strakosha (b. 1995) 47 caps, 2016–2026 – Father & Son – Andrea Marko (b. 1956) 5 caps, 1980–1985 – Their cousin
Besnik Prenga (b. 1969) 73 caps, 1992–1994 & Herdi Prenga (b. 1994) 2 caps, 2018 – Father & Son
Xhevahir Kapllani (b. 1974) 5 caps, 1993–1996 & Edmond Kapllani (b. 1982) 41 caps, 2004–2014 – Brothers
Klodian Duro (b. 1977) 77 caps, 2001–2011 & Albert Duro (b. 1978) 5 caps, 1999–2000 – Brothers
Armando Sadiku (b. 1991) 39 caps, 2012–2023 & Taulant Xhaka (b. 1991) 31 caps, 2014–2019 – Cousins
Migjen Basha (b. 1987) 34 caps, 2013–2019 & Vullnet Basha (b. 1990) 1 cap, 2013 – Brothers
Klaus Gjasula (b. 1989) 29 caps, 2019–2024 & Jürgen Gjasula (b. 1985) 2 caps, 2013 – Brothers
Tedi Cara (b. 2000) 2 caps, 2022 & Mario Dajsinani (b. 1998) 4 caps, 2022–2026 – Cousins

All-time XI based on appearances

No.	Position	Player	Caps	Years
1	Goalkeeper	Etrit Berisha	85	2012–2026
4	Right back	Elseid Hysaj	105	2013–2026
5	Central defence	Lorik Cana	93	2003–2016
6	Central defence	Berat Gjimshiti	79	2015–2026
7	Left back	Ansi Agolli	73	2005–2017
2	Defensive midfield	Andi Lila	70	2007–2018
3	Defensive midfield	Altin Lala	79	1998–2011
10	Side midfield	Klodian Duro	77	2001–2011
8	Side midfield	Odise Roshi	71	2011–2022
11	Offensive midfield	Ervin Skela	75	2000–2011
9	Forward	Erjon Bogdani	75	1996–2013

=== Goals ===
Most goals

As of 15 November 2026, Albania's leading goalscorers are:

No.	Name	Goals	Caps	Average	National team career
1	Erjon Bogdani	18	75	0.24	1996–2013
2	Rey Manaj*	15	51	0.29	2015–
3	Alban Bushi	14	67	0.21	1995–2007
4	Ervin Skela	13	75	0.17	2000–2011
=	Sokol Cikalleshi*	13	60	0.22	2014–2024
6	Armando Sadiku*	12	39	0.31	2012–2023
7	Altin Rraklli	11	63	0.17	1992–2005
=	Hamdi Salihi	11	50	0.22	2006–2015
9	Igli Tare	10	68	0.15	1997–2007
=	Sokol Kushta	10	31	0.32	1987–1996

* Active players

First goal (unofficial)
Qamil Teliti, 22 August 1946, 5–0 vs. Montenegro

First official goal
Pal Mirashi, 7 October 1946, 2–3 vs. Yugoslavia

Most competitive goals
Rey Manaj 13
Erjon Bogdani 11 (Note: Erjon Bogdani scored 4 goals in World Cup 2006 qualification, 1 in Euro 2008 qualifying, 3 in World Cup 2010 qualification, 2 in Euro 2012 qualifying and 1 in World Cup 2014 qualification.)

Most goals by a substitute
Erjon Bogdani, Myrto Uzuni and Armando Broja, 4 each

Oldest goalscorer
Erjon Bogdani, 35 years 10 months 23 days, 6 February 2013, 1–2 vs. Georgia

Youngest goalscorers under-20
Haxhi Ballgjini, 18 years 4 months 19 days, 3 November 1976, 3–0 vs. Algeria

Rey Manaj, 18 years 8 months 20 days, 13 November 2015, 2–2 vs. Kosovo

Medin Zhega, 19 years 3 months 1 day, 2 May 1965, 0–1 vs. Switzerland

Armando Broja, 19 years 11 months 26 days, 5 September 2021, 1–0 vs. Hungary

Oldest debutant to score on debut
Bajram Fraholli, 28 years 1 month 26 days, 9 November 1996, 1–1 vs. Armenia

Fastest goal
Nedim Bajrami, 23 seconds, 15 June 2024, 2–0 vs. Italy, Euro 2024

Fastest goal by a substitute
Rey Manaj, 12 seconds, 13 November 2015, 2–2 vs. Kosovo

Fastest goal at the old Qemal Stafa Stadium
Jahmir Hyka, 46 seconds, 20 August 2008, 2–0 vs. Liechtenstein

First goal by a substitute
Kolec Kraja, 15 September 1957, 2–3 vs. China

Second goal by a substitute
Mahir Halili, 21 January 1998, 4–1 vs. Turkey

First competitive goal by a substitute
Devi Muka, 4 September 1999, 3–3 vs. Latvia, Euro 2000 qualifying

Scoring in most consecutive Albania matches
Adrian Aliaj, 5 matches

Scoring in most consecutive competitive appearances
Sokol Cikalleshi, 4 matches, 14 October 2019, 4–0 vs. Moldova (Euro 2020 qualifying) – 18 November 2020, 3–2 vs. Belarus (2020–21 UEFA Nations League C)

Scoring in most consecutive Albania matches in the same tournament
3 – Sokol Cikalleshi (Euro 2020 qualifying), Armando Broja (World Cup 2022 qualifying), and Nedim Bajrami (Euro 2024 qualifying)

Goals in three separate decades
Erjon Bogdani, 1990s, 2000s, 2010s

Most goals at the old Qemal Stafa Stadium
Erjon Bogdani, 12

Most goals at the new Air Albania Stadium
Kristjan Asllani, 5
Rey Manaj, 5
Sokol Cikalleshi, 3
Jasir Asani, 3
Nedim Bajrami, 3

Most goals at the UEFA European Championship
Armando Sadiku, Nedim Bajrami, Qazim Laçi and Klaus Gjasula – 1 each

Most goals at a single European Championship
Armando Sadiku, Nedim Bajrami, Qazim Laçi and Klaus Gjasula – 1 each

First goal in a European Championship match
Armando Sadiku, 19 June 2016, 1–0 vs. Romania

Players with most European Championships scorerd in
1 – Armando Sadiku (2016), Nedim Bajrami (2024), Qazim Laçi (2024) and Klaus Gjasula (2024)

Most goals across European Championship and qualifying
Nedim Bajrami, 4

Oldest goalscorer at the European Championship
Klaus Gjasula, 34 years 6 months 5 days, 19 June 2024, 2–2 vs. Croatia

Youngest goalscorer at the European Championship
Armando Sadiku, 25 years 23 days, 19 June 2016, 1–0 vs. Romania

Fastest goal by a substitute at the European Championship
Klaus Gjasula, 23 minutes, 19 June 2024, 2–2 vs. Croatia

First goal in European Championship qualifying
Panajot Pano, 30 October 1963, 1–0 vs. Denmark

Most goals in European Championship qualifying
Edmond Kapllani and Sokol Cikalleshi, 5

Most goals in a single European Championship qualifying campaign
Edmond Kapllani, 5, Euro 2008 qualifying

Most goals in World Cup qualifiers
Erjon Bogdani, 8

First goal in a World Cup qualifying match
Robert Jashari, 7 May 1965, 1–4 vs. Northern Ireland, 1966 FIFA World Cup qualification – UEFA Group 5

Most goals in a single World Cup qualifying campaign
Erjon Bogdani, 4, 2006 FIFA World Cup qualification

First goal in a World Cup qualifying play-off match
Arbër Hoxha, 26 March 2026, 1–2 vs. Poland, 2026 FIFA World Cup qualification second round (semi-finals)

First goal in a UEFA Nations League match
Taulant Xhaka, 7 September 2018, 1–0 vs. Israel

Most UEFA Nations League goals
Rey Manaj, 6
Sokol Cikalleshi and Kristjan Asllani, 4 each

Most goals in a single UEFA Nations League campaign
4 – Sokol Cikalleshi, 2020–21 League C and Rey Manaj, 2026–27 League C

First goal in a Balkan Cup
Pal Mirashi, 7 October 1946, 1–1 vs. Yugoslavia

Most goals at the Balkan Cup
Loro Boriçi and Pal Mirashi – 3 each

Most goals at a single Balkan Cup
Loro Boriçi, Pal Mirashi and Qamil Teliti – 2 each at the 1946 edition

Most Balkan Cups scored in
2 – Loro Boriçi, in the 1946 and 1947 editions; and Qamil Teliti, in the 1946 and 1948 editions

Most consecutive Balkan Cups scored in
2 – Loro Boriçi, 1946 & 1947

First goal in a Malta (Rothmans) International Tournament match
Ilir Shulku, 6 February 1998, 1–1 vs. Malta

Most goals at the Malta (Rothmans) International Tournament
Bledar Kola, 2

Most goals at a single Malta (Rothmans) International Tournament
Bledar Kola, 2

Most goals in Summer Olympics qualifying
Medin Zhega and Panajot Pano, 1 each

First goal in a Summer Olympics qualifying match
Medin Zhega, 18 April 1971, 1–2 vs. Romania

Goal at the Bahrain Shoot Soccer Tournament
Indrit Fortuzi, 1 (7 January 2002, 1–1 vs. Finland)

Most goals scored in a calendar year
5 – Edmond Kapllani in 2007 and Armando Sadiku in 2016

Most consecutive years of scoring
Ervin Skela, 8, 2003–2010

Most competitive goals scored against the same opponent
3 – Sokol Kushta vs. Moldova, Bledar Kola vs. Germany, Igli Tare vs. Georgia, Edmond Kapllani vs. Luxembourg, Sokol Cikalleshi vs. Belarus and Moldova, Rey Manaj vs. Andorra and San Marino and Myrto Uzuni vs. San Marino

Most goals scored against the same opponent in competitive and friendly matches
Erjon Bogdani, 3 vs. Malta

Most goals by a midfielder
Ervin Skela, 13

Most goals by a defender
Adrian Aliaj, 8

Most goals from a penalty kick
Ervin Skela and Kristjan Asllani – 4 each

Most goals from a penalty kick in a single match
Ervin Skela and Bledar Kola, 2 each

Most goals on debut
2 – Xhelal Juka and Qamil Teliti, both on 22 September 1946, 5–0 vs. Montenegro

Most appearances while scoring in every match
1 – Xhelal Juka (2 goals), Ruzhdi Bizhuta and Genc Tomorri

Most goalscorers in a match
5, 12 August 2009, 6–1 vs. Cyprus – Ervin Skela (2), Erjon Bogdani, Klodian Duro, Ansi Agolli and Emiljano Vila
5, 8 September 2021, 5–0 vs. San Marino – Rey Manaj, Qazim Laçi, Armando Broja, Elseid Hysaj and Myrto Uzuni

Most goals with an Albanian club
Ilir Përnaska, 5 with Dinamo Tirana

Most goals with a non-Albanian club
Hamdi Salihi, 8 with Rapid Wien
Adrian Aliaj, 7 with Rot-Weiß Oberhausen
Rey Manaj, 7 with Sivasspor

Most goals by a player from the second division of a country
Adrian Aliaj, 8, scored between 11 October 2003 and 4 September 2004 as part of Rot-Weiß Oberhausen in the 2. Bundesliga, and on 1 March 2006, 2–1 vs. Lithuania, as part of Brest in the 2005–06 Ligue 2.
Rey Manaj, 6, scored between 14 October 2019 – 14 November 2019, as part of Albacete Balompié in the Segunda División and on 15 November 2026 as part of Sivasspor in the TFF 1. Lig.
Ervin Skela, 4, scored between 25 April 2001 with Chemnitzer FC and 11 June 2003 with Eintracht Frankfurt, and on 3 March 2010 with TuS Koblenz, all three clubs in the 2. Bundesliga.
Altin Rraklli, 3, scored on 17 February 1993, 1–2 vs. Northern Ireland, as part of SC Freiburg in the 1992–93 2. Bundesliga, and twice on 21 January 1998, 4–1 vs. Turkey, as part of SpVgg Unterhaching in the 1997–98 2. Bundesliga.
Igli Tare, 3, scored between 11 October 1997 and 5 June 1999 as part of Fortuna Düsseldorf in the 2. Bundesliga.
Edmond Kapllani, 3, scored within five days between 2 and 6 June 2007, in 2–0 and 3–0 victories over Luxembourg, as part of Karlsruher SC in the 2006–07 2. Bundesliga.
Sokol Cikalleshi, 3, scored between 7 September and 14 October 2019, including in a 4–0 victory over Moldova, as part of Akhisar Belediyespor in the 2019–20 TFF First League.

Most goals by a player from the third division of a country
Rey Manaj, 3, 4 September 2020 – 8 June 2021, while playing for Barcelona B in the Segunda División B.

Youngest player to score a brace in unofficial matches
Xhelal Juka, 20 years 5 months 17 days, 22 September 1946, 5–0 vs. Montenegro

Youngest player to score a brace in official matches
Ilir Përnaska, 20 years 6 months 7 days, 14 November 1971, 3–0 vs. Turkey

First player to score a brace in unofficial matches
Qamil Teliti, 22 September 1946, 5–0 vs. Montenegro

First player to score a brace in official matches
Loro Boriçi, 7 October 1946, 2–3 vs. Yugoslavia

Youngest player to score a brace in a World Cup qualifying match
Bledar Kola, 24 years 8 months 1 day, 2 April 1997, 2–3 vs. Germany

Youngest player to score a brace in a European Championship qualifying match
Edmond Kapllani, 24 years 10 months 6 days, 6 June 2007, 0–3 vs. Luxembourg

Youngest player to score a brace in a Nations League match
Kristjan Asllani, 24 years 6 months 28 days, 6 October 2026, 2–1 vs. San Marino

Oldest player to score a brace in a Nations League match
Sokol Cikalleshi, 30 years 3 months 22 days, 18 November 2020, 3–2 vs. Belarus

Longest gap between goals
Altin Haxhi, 8 years 9 months 14 days, 19 August 1998, 2–3 vs. Cyprus – 2 June 2007, 2–0 vs. Luxembourg

Panajot Pano, 8 years 15 days, 30 October 1963, 1–0 vs. Denmark – 14 November 1971, 3–0 vs. Turkey

Missed penalties
Altin Rraklli, 2 April 1997 vs. Germany, 14th minute
Klodian Duro, 29 March 2003 vs. Russia, 18th minute
Ervin Skela, 18 February 2004 vs. Sweden, 90th minute
Ervin Skela, 17 October 2007 vs. Bulgaria, 90th minute
Sokol Cikalleshi, 20 June 2023 vs. Faroe Islands, 32nd minute
Rey Manaj, 7 June 2025 vs. Serbia, 45th minute

Own goals
European Championship qualifying
Agustin Kola, 22 September 1982, 5–0 vs. Austria
Hysen Zmijani, 30 March 1991, 5–0 vs. France
Nevil Dede, 11 October 2006, 2–1 vs. Netherlands
Mërgim Mavraj, 29 March 2015, 2–1 vs. Armenia
European Championship
Klaus Gjasula, 19 June 2024, 2–2 vs. Croatia

Hat-tricks

None

=== Goalkeeping ===
Most clean sheets
Etrit Berisha, 39

Longest unbeaten streak
Arjan Beqaj, 552 minutes

Least number of goals conceded in a single European Championship by a starting goalkeeper
Etrit Berisha, 3

Most clean sheets in a single European Championship
Etrit Berisha, 1

Most consecutive clean sheets in European Championship qualifying
Arjan Beqaj, 4

Longest unbeaten streak at the European Championship
Etrit Berisha, 174 minutes

Longest unbeaten streak in European Championship qualifying matches
Arjan Beqaj, 497 minutes

Longest unbeaten streak in European Championship and qualifying matches
Thomas Strakosha, 240 minutes

Most consecutive clean sheets in World Cup qualifiers
Thomas Strakosha, 3

Longest unbeaten streak in World Cup qualifying matches
Thomas Strakosha, 388 minutes

Most consecutive clean sheets in the Nations League
Etrit Berisha, 3
Thomas Strakosha, 2

Longest unbeaten streak in the Nations League
Etrit Berisha, 407 minutes

Most penalty kicks saved
Samir Ujkani, 2

Most penalty kicks saved in World Cup qualifying
1 – Ilion Lika, Alban Hoxha and Thomas Strakosha

Most penalty kicks saved in a single match
Samir Ujkani, 2, 29 February 2012, vs. Georgia

Youngest goalkeeper to feature in a match
Qemal Vogli, 17 years 7 months 26 days, 25 May 1947, vs. Romania

Youngest goalkeeper to start in a competitive match
Blendi Nallbani, 17 years 10 months 27 days, 26 April 1989, vs. England

Most matches completed by a goalkeeper
Etrit Berisha, 73 (2012–2026) (Note: Etrit Berisha started 84 of his 85 matches for Albania, was substituted off 9 times and was sent-off twice.)

Most matches as a starter by a goalkeeper
Etrit Berisha, 84, 2012–2026

Most appearances by a goalkeeper from the second division of a country
Foto Strakosha, 11, 4 September 1991 – 11 November 1992 as part of Ethnikos Piraeus and 20 August 2003 – 15 November 2003 as part of Ethnikos Asteras, both in the Beta Ethniki.
Etrit Berisha, 7, 11 October 2020 – 28 March 2021 as part of SPAL in the Serie B.

Most appearances by a goalkeeper from the third division of a country
Samir Ujkani, 3, 12 August 2009 – 14 October 2009 as part of Novara in the 2009–10 Lega Pro Prima Divisione, the third tier of Italian football.

=== Coaching ===
Most manager appearances on the Albania bench
Gianni De Biasi, 52

Most European Championship appearances as a manager
Gianni De Biasi and Sylvinho, 3 each

=== Captains ===
First captain
Loro Boriçi, 22 August 1946, 5–0 vs. Montenegro

Most appearances as captain
Lorik Cana, 41

Most appearances as captain as a goalkeeper
Etrit Berisha, 22

Most appearances as captain at the UEFA European Championship
Berat Djimsiti, 3
Ansi Agolli, 2 (Note: Agolli served as Albania's acting captain at UEFA Euro 2016 after Lorik Cana was sent off in the opening match against Switzerland. He captained the team in the next fixture and again in the final group match against Romania, with Cana beginning the latter game on the bench.)

Longest serving captain
Loro Boriçi, 1946–1953

List of captaincy periods of the various captains throughout the years.

- 1946–1953 Loro Boriçi
- 1946 → Bahri Kavaja (Vice-captain)
- 1958 Besim Fagu
- 1963–1964 Fatbardh Deliallisi
- 1964–1970 Lin Shllaku
- 1967 → Mikel Janku (Vice-captain)
- 1970–1973 Panajot Pano
- 1971 → Bashkim Muhedini (Vice-captain)
- 1973 → Ramazan Rragami (Vice-captain)
- 1976 Sabah Bizi
- 1980–1981 Safet Berisha
- 1982 Ilir Luarasi
- 1982–1985 Muhedin Targaj
- 1983 → Haxhi Ballgjini (Vice-captain)
- 1986–1989 Arben Minga
- 1987 → Perlat Musta (Vice-captain)
- 1987 → Shkëlqim Muça (Vice-captain)
- 1989–1990 Skënder Hodja
- 1990–1995 Sulejman Demollari
- 1990–1991 → Hysen Zmijani (Vice-captain)
- 1992 → Agustin Kola (Vice-captain)
- 1993 → Sokol Kushta (Vice-captain)
- 1995 → Foto Strakosha (Vice-captain)
- 1995 → Ilir Shulku (Vice-captain)
- 1995–1996 Sokol Kushta
- 1996 → Foto Strakosha (Vice-captain)
- 1997–2002 Rudi Vata
- 2000 → Edvin Murati (Vice-captain)
- 2001 → Foto Strakosha (Vice-captain)
- 2002 → Indrit Fortuzi (Vice-captain)
- 2002–2004 Foto Strakosha
- 2004 → Besnik Hasi (Vice-captain)
- 2005–2007 Igli Tare
- 2005 → Altin Haxhi (Vice-captain)
- 2005–2006 → Altin Lala (Vice-captain)
- 2005 → Alban Bushi (Vice-captain)
- 2005 → Besnik Hasi (Vice-captain)
- 2007–2009 Altin Lala
- 2007 → Klodian Duro (Vice-captain)
- 2007 → Altin Haxhi (Vice-captain)
- 2007–2009 → Ervin Skela (Vice-captain)
- 2009–2011 Ervin Skela
- 2009 → Elvin Beqiri (Vice-captain)
- 2010–2011 → Altin Lala (Vice-captain)
- 2010 → Lorik Cana (Vice-captain)
- 2011 Altin Lala
- 2011 → Lorik Cana (Vice-captain)
- 2011 → Arjan Beqaj (Vice-captain)
- 2011–2016 Lorik Cana
- 2012–2013 → Ervin Bulku (Vice-captain)
- 2013 → Erjon Bogdani (Vice-captain)
- 2014 → Etrit Berisha (Vice-captain)
- 2015–2016 → Ansi Agolli (Vice-captain)
- 2016 → Ledian Memushaj (Vice-captain)
- 2016 → Elseid Hysaj (Vice-captain)
- 2016–2017 Ansi Agolli
- 2016–2017 → Mërgim Mavraj (Vice-captain)
- 2017 → Elseid Hysaj (Vice-captain)
- 2017 → Etrit Berisha (Vice-captain)
- 2017–2018 Etrit Berisha
- 2018 → Odise Roshi (Vice-captain)
- 2018 → Jahmir Hyka (Vice-captain)
- 2018 → Elseid Hysaj (Vice-captain)
- 2018–2019 Mërgim Mavraj
- 2018–2019 → Elseid Hysaj (Vice-captain)
- 2019 → Ledian Memushaj (Vice-captain)
- 2019 → Amir Abrashi (Vice-captain)
- 2019–2020 Elseid Hysaj
- 2020–2022 Etrit Berisha
- 2020–2022 → Elseid Hysaj (Vice-captain)
- 2021 → Amir Abrashi (Vice-captain)
- 2022 → Sokol Cikalleshi (Vice-captain)
- 2022 → Odise Roshi (Vice-captain)
- 2022 → Sherif Kallaku (Vice-captain)
- 2023 Elseid Hysaj
- 2023– Berat Djimsiti
- 2023 → Thomas Strakosha (Vice-captain)
- 2024 → Etrit Berisha (Vice-captain)
- 2024 → Elseid Hysaj (Vice-captain)
- 2024 → Ardian Ismajli (Vice-captain)
- 2025–2026 → Rey Manaj (Vice-captain)

=== Disciplinary ===
Most yellow cards
Lorik Cana, 26

Most red cards
Edvin Murati, 3

First player to be sent off at a UEFA European Championship
Lorik Cana, double-yellow, 11 June 2016, vs. Switzerland

== Team records ==
Venue most played in
Qemal Stafa Stadium, 131

Largest victory
5–0 vs. Vietnam, 12 February 2003
6–1 vs. Cyprus, 12 August 2009
5–0 vs. San Marino, 9 September 2021

Largest unofficial victory
5–0 vs. Montenegro, 22 September 1946

Largest UEFA European Championship victory
1–0 vs. Romania, 19 June 2016

Largest defeat
0–12 vs. Hungary, 24 September 1950

Largest UEFA European Championship defeat
0–2 vs. France, 15 June 2016

Most total goals in a single match
0–12 vs. Hungary, 24 September 1950

Most consecutive victories
5, 4 September 2025 vs Gibraltar – 13 November 2025 vs Andorra

4, achieved 3 times:
9 October 1999 vs. Georgia – 10 February 2000 vs. Malta
3 March 2010 vs. Northern Ireland – 11 August 2010 vs. Uzbekistan
11 November 2020 vs. Kosovo – 3 March 2021 vs. Andorra

Most consecutive matches without defeat
8, achieved thrice:
14 November 2009 vs. Estonia – 8 October 2010 vs. Bosnia and Herzegovina
17 June 2023 vs. Moldova – 20 November 2023 vs. Faroe Islands
24 March 2025 vs Andorra – 13 November 2025 vs Andorra

Most consecutive matches with at least one Albanian goal scored
8, 10 September 2003 vs. Georgia – 4 September 2004 vs. Greece

Most consecutive matches with no goals conceded
5, achieved twice:
24 March 2007 vs. Slovenia – 22 August 2007 vs. Malta
3 March 2010 vs. Northern Ireland – 11 August 2010 vs. Uzbekistan

Most consecutive draws
3, achieved twice:
23 May 1948 vs. Hungary – 23 October 1948 vs. Romania
15 October 2008 vs. Portugal – 11 February 2009 vs. Malta

Most consecutive matches without a draw
18, 8 March 1989 vs. England – 9 September 1992 vs. Northern Ireland
Most consecutive defeats
10, 8 March 1989 vs. England – 1 May 1991 vs. Czechoslovakia

Most consecutive matches without victory
25, 27 February 1985 vs. Greece – 1 May 1991 vs. Czechoslovakia

== Competition records ==
=== FIFA World Cup ===
FIFA World Cup record										Qualification record						
Year	Round	Pos.	Pld	W	D	L	GF	GA	Squad	Pos.	Pld	W	D	L	GF	GA
(Uruguay) 1930	Not a FIFA member									Not a FIFA member						
(Italy) 1934 to (Chile) 1962	Did not participate									Did not participate						
(England) 1966	Did not qualify									4th	6	0	1	5	2	12
(Mexico) 1970	Entry not accepted									Entry not accepted						
(West Germany) 1974	Did not qualify									4th	6	1	0	5	3	13
(Argentina) 1978	Did not participate									Did not participate						
(Spain) 1982	Did not qualify									4th	8	1	0	7	4	22
(Mexico) 1986	Did not qualify									3rd	6	1	2	3	6	9
(Italy) 1990	Did not qualify									4th	6	0	0	6	3	15
(United States) 1994	Did not qualify									7th	12	1	2	9	6	26
(France) 1998	Did not qualify									6th	10	1	1	8	7	20
(South Korea) (Japan) 2002	Did not qualify									5th	8	1	0	7	5	14
(Germany) 2006	Did not qualify									5th	12	4	1	7	11	20
(South Africa) 2010	Did not qualify									5th	10	1	4	5	6	13
(Brazil) 2014	Did not qualify									5th	10	3	2	5	9	11
(Russia) 2018	Did not qualify									3rd	10	4	1	5	10	13
(Qatar) 2022	Did not qualify									3rd	10	6	0	4	12	12
(Canada) (Mexico) (United States) 2026	Did not qualify									2nd R2 P.O	9	4	2	3	8	7
(Spain) (Portugal) (Morocco) 2030 (Note: Additional matches are scheduled to be played in Argentina, Paraguay, and Uruguay in commemoration of the 100th anniversary of the first world cup, however they are not considered to be official hosts of the tournament.)	To be determined									To be determined						
(Saudi Arabia) 2034	To be determined									To be determined						
Total	—	0/23	0	0	0	0	0	0	—	14/23	123	28	16	79	92	207

=== UEFA European Championship ===
UEFA European Championship record										Qualifying record						
Year	Round	Pos.	Pld	W	D	L	GF	GA	Squad	Pos.	Pld	W	D	L	GF	GA
(France) 1960	Did not participate									Did not participate						
(Spain) 1964	Did not qualify									R16	4	3	0	1	7	4
(Italy) 1968	Did not qualify									3rd	4	0	1	3	0	12
(Belgium) 1972	Did not qualify									4th	6	1	1	4	5	9
(Socialist Federal Republic of Yugoslavia) 1976 to (Italy) 1980	Did not participate									Did not participate						
(France) 1984	Did not qualify									5th	8	0	2	6	4	14
(West Germany) 1988	Did not qualify									4th	6	0	0	6	2	17
(Sweden) 1992	Did not qualify									5th	7	1	0	6	2	21
(England) 1996	Did not qualify									5th	10	2	2	6	10	16
(Belgium) (Netherlands) 2000	Did not qualify									5th	10	1	4	5	8	14
(Portugal) 2004	Did not qualify									4th	8	2	2	4	11	15
(Austria) (Switzerland) 2008	Did not qualify									5th	12	2	5	5	12	18
(Poland) (Ukraine) 2012	Did not qualify									5th	10	2	3	5	7	14
(France) 2016	Group stage	18th	3	1	0	2	1	3	Squad	2nd	8	4	2	2	10	5
(Europe) 2020	Did not qualify									4th	10	4	1	5	16	14
(Germany) 2024	Group stage	21st	3	0	1	2	3	5	Squad	1st	8	4	3	1	12	4
(England) (Scotland) (Republic of Ireland) (Wales) 2028	To be determined									To be determined						
(Italy) (Turkey) 2032	To be determined									To be determined						
Total	Group stage	2/17	6	1	1	4	4	8	—	14/17	111	26	26	59	100	177

Albania's European Championship record
First match	Albania 0–1 Switzerland (Stade Bollaert-Delelis, Lens, France; 11 June 2016)
Biggest win	Romania 0–1 Albania (Parc Olympique Lyonnais, Lyon, France; 19 June 2016)
Biggest defeat	France 2–0 Albania (Stade Vélodrome, Marseille, France; 15 June 2016)
Best result	Group stage in 2016 and 2024
Worst result	Group stage in 2016 and 2024

=== UEFA Nations League ===
UEFA Nations League record
League phase**												Finals							
Season	L&G	Pos.	Pld	W	D	L	GF	GA	P/R	RK	Year	Pos.	Pld	W	D*	L	GF	GA	Squad
2018–19	C1	3rd	4	1	0	3	1	8	Same position	34th	(Portugal) 2019	Did not qualify							
2020–21	C4	1st	6	3	2	1	8	4	▲	35th	(Italy) 2021	Did not qualify							
2022–23	B2	3rd	4	0	2	2	4	6	Same position	27th	(Netherlands) 2023	Did not qualify							
2024–25	B1	4th	6	2	1	3	4	6	▼	29th	(Germany) 2025	Did not qualify							
2026–27	C1	1st	6	5	0	1	12	3	▲	34th	2027	Did not qualify							
2028–29	B	-	-	-	-	-	-	-			2029	Did not qualify							
2030–31	To be determined										2031								
Total			26	11	5	10	29	27	27th		Total	—	—	—	—	—	—	—	—

*Draws include knockout matches decided via penalty shoot-out.
**League stage played home and away. Flag shown represents host nation for the finals stage.

=== Summer Olympics ===
Olympic Games record										Qualification record						
Year	Result	Pos.	Pld	W	D	L	GF	GA	Squad	Pos.	Pld	W	D	L	GF	GA
(United Kingdom) 1908 to (Germany) 1936	Team did not exist									Team did not exist						
(United Kingdom) 1948 to (Italy) 1960	Did not participate									Did not participate						
(Japan) 1964	Did not qualify									PR	2	0	0	2	0	2
(Mexico) 1968	Did not participate									Did not participate						
(West Germany) 1972	Did not qualify									PO	2	0	0	2	2	4
(Canada) 1976 to (South Korea) 1988	Did not participate									Did not participate						
Since (Spain) 1992	See Albania national under-23 team									See Albania national under-23 team						
Total	—	0/2	0	0	0	0	0	0	—	2/2	4	0	0	4	2	6

=== Other tournaments ===
Champions Runners-up Third place Tournament played fully or partially on home soil

Year	Ranking	Pos.	Pld	W	D	L	GF	GA	Squad
Balkan Cup
(Albania) 1946	Winner	1st	3	2	0	1	6	4	Squad
1947	Fifth place	5th	4	0	0	4	2	13	Squad
1948	Fifth place	5th	3	1	2	0	1	0	Squad
Malta International Tournament
1998	Third place	3rd	3	0	2	1	3	6	Squad
2000	Winner	1st	3	3	0	0	5	0	Squad
Bahrain Shoot Tournament
2002	Third place	3rd	3	0	2	1	1	4	Squad
Total	Best: Winner	6/6	19	6	6	7	18	27	—

=== Medal table overview ===
Overview
Event	1st place	2nd place	3rd place
World Cup	0	0	0
UEFA European Championship	0	0	0
UEFA Nations League	0	0	0
Summer Olympics	0	0	0
Mediterranean Games	0	0	0
Balkan Cup	1	0	0
Malta International Tournament	1	0	1
Bahrain Shoot Tournament	0	0	1

== FIFA rankings ==
As of 7 October 2026

Best Ranking Worst Ranking Best Mover Worst Mover

Albania's FIFA world rankings
Rank	Year	Pld	Best		Worst	
Rank	Year	Pld	Rank	Move	Rank	Move
66	2026	8	63	▲1	67	▼3
63	2025	10	61	▲4	68	▼3
65	2024	13	64	▲2	67	▼2
62	2023	9	59	▲3	68	▼3
66	2022	11	65	▲1	69	▼1
66	2021	12	63	▲3	69	▼3
66	2020	7	66	▲3	69	▼3
66	2019	9	61	▲2	66	▼4
60	2018	9	56	▲2	60	▼3
62	2017	9	51	▲9	71	▼12
49	2016	12	35	▲5	49	▼10
38	2015	7	22	▲15	63	▼7
58	2014	9	45	▲25	70	▼16
57	2013	8	37	▲16	71	▼13
63	2012	9	58	▲17	97	▼10
74	2011	11	50	▲23	75	▼14
65	2010	9	58	▲13	97	▼7
96	2009	9	78	▲3	98	▼11
81	2008	7	73	▲19	102	▼18
80	2007	11	66	▲11	88	▼12
87	2006	6	62	▲20	88	▼13
82	2005	10	82	▲7	93	▼4
86	2004	8	86	▲5	94	▼5
89	2003	11	86	▲13	101	▼5
93	2002	9	92	▲4	97	▼5
96	2001	7	74	▲1	96	▼6
72	2000	8	72	▲13	94	▼6
83	1999	8	83	▲15	95	▼2
106	1998	8	97	▲14	109	▼8
116	1997	7	113	▲8	124	▼4
116	1996	5	90	▲6	116	▼12
91	1995	8	87	▲13	106	▼6
100	1994	5	93	▲9	113	▼11
92	1993	7	91	▲1	93	▼6
86	1992	6	86	–	86	–

== Head-to-head record ==
As of 15 November 2026 after the match against Belarus.

Key
Positive balance (more Wins)
Neutral balance (Wins = Losses)
Negative balance (more Losses)

Opponent	Pld	W	D	L	GF	GA	GD	Win %	Reference
Algeria (Note: Includes match against the Algeria Olympic team.)	2	1	1	0	4	1	+3	50%	H2H results H2H results*
Andorra	9	7	1	1	15	4	+11	77.77%	H2H results
Argentina	1	0	0	1	0	4	−4	0%	H2H results
Armenia	6	4	1	1	10	5	+5	66.6%	H2H results
Austria	7	0	0	7	2	19	−17	0%	H2H results
Azerbaijan	6	4	1	1	8	4	+4	66.6%	H2H results
Bahrain	1	0	0	1	0	3	−3	0%	H2H results
Belarus	9	5	2	2	14	10	+4	55.5%	H2H results
Belgium	2	1	0	1	3	3	0	50%	H2H results
Bosnia and Herzegovina	5	1	2	2	4	5	−1	20%	H2H results
Bulgaria	14	3	4	7	10	17	−7	21.4%	H2H results
Cameroon	1	0	1	0	0	0	0	0%	H2H results
Chile	1	0	0	1	0	3	−3	0%	H2H results
China	2	0	1	1	3	4	−1	0%	H2H results H2H results*
Croatia	1	0	1	0	2	2	0	0%	H2H results
Cuba	1	0	1	0	0	0	0	0%	H2H results
Cyprus	6	2	2	2	12	7	+5	33.3%	H2H results
Czech Republic (Note: Includes matches against Czechoslovakia.)	10	3	2	5	11	16	−5	30%	H2H results
Denmark	10	1	3	6	4	19	−15	10%	H2H results
East Germany	3	0	1	2	2	7	−5	0%	H2H results
England	8	0	0	8	1	23	−22	0%	H2H results
Estonia	4	1	3	0	3	1	+2	25%	H2H results
Faroe Islands	2	1	1	0	3	1	+2	50%	H2H results
Finland	9	3	1	5	9	10	−1	33%	H2H results
France	9	1	1	7	4	20	−16	11.1%	H2H results
Georgia	17	4	4	9	14	24	−10	23.5%	H2H results
Germany (Note: Includes matches against West Germany.)	14	0	1	13	10	38	−28	0%	H2H results
Gibraltar	1	1	0	0	1	0	+1	100%	H2H results
Greece (Note: Includes awarded matches at the Euro 1964 qualifying.)	15	6	3	6	16	13	+3	50%	H2H results
Hungary	8	2	1	5	2	19	−17	25%	H2H results
Iceland	9	3	2	4	11	12	−1	33.3%	H2H results
Iran	1	1	0	0	1	0	+1	100%	H2H results
Israel	7	2	0	5	6	10	−4	28.5%	H2H results
Italy	5	0	0	5	2	9	−5	0%	H2H results
Jordan	2	1	1	0	4	2	+2	50%	H2H results
Kazakhstan	4	3	1	0	6	2	+4	75%	H2H results
Kosovo	7	5	1	1	13	9	+1	71%	H2H results
Latvia	7	1	6	0	8	7	+1	14.28%	H2H results
Liechtenstein	4	4	0	0	6	0	+9	100%	H2H results
Lithuania	6	2	1	3	7	7	0	33.3%	H2H results
Luxembourg	8	3	1	4	8	8	0	37.5%	H2H results
North Macedonia	10	2	4	4	7	12	−5	20%	H2H results
Malta	8	5	2	1	14	3	+11	62.5%	H2H results
Mexico	1	0	0	1	0	4	−4	0%	H2H results
Moldova	7	5	2	0	15	3	+12	71.4%	H2H results
Montenegro	3	3	0	0	9	2	+7	100%	H2H results 1946 match
Morocco	1	0	1	0	0	0	0	0%	H2H results
Netherlands	4	0	0	4	1	7	−6	0%	H2H results
Northern Ireland	9	2	2	5	5	13	−8	22.2%	H2H results
Norway	5	1	2	2	5	6	−1	20%	H2H results
Poland	16	2	3	11	11	22	−11	12.5%	H2H results
Portugal	7	1	1	5	5	13	−8	14.2%	H2H results
Qatar	3	2	0	1	5	3	+2	66.6%	H2H results
Republic of Ireland	4	0	1	3	2	6	−4	0%	H2H results
Romania (Note: Includes matches against the Romania Olympic team at 1971 Mediterranean Games qualifying.)	19	3	3	13	12	45	−33	15.7%	H2H results H2H results*
Russia	2	1	0	1	4	5	−1	50%	H2H results
Scotland	2	0	0	2	0	6	−6	0%	H2H results
San Marino	6	6	0	0	18	1	+16	100%	H2H results
Saudi Arabia	1	0	1	0	1	1	0	0%	H2H results
Serbia (Note: Includes matches against Yugoslavia.)	9	2	2	5	8	15	−7	22.2%	H2H results
Slovenia	7	1	2	4	2	6	−4	14.2%	H2H results
Spain	9	0	0	9	3	32	−28	0%	H2H results
Sweden	6	1	1	4	5	11	−6	16.6%	H2H results
Switzerland	7	0	1	6	4	12	−8	0%	H2H results
Turkey	12	4	2	6	14	13	+1	33.3%	H2H results
Ukraine	9	1	1	7	7	17	−10	11.1%	H2H results
Uzbekistan	1	1	0	0	1	0	+1	100%	H2H results
Vietnam	1	1	0	0	5	0	+5	100%	H2H results
Wales	4	1	2	1	2	3	−1	25%	H2H results
69 nations	415	121	85	209	405	606	−201	28.9%	All H2H results
