= List of Albania national football team captains =

This is a list of all the players who have captained the Albania national football team

== List of captains ==
List of captaincy periods of the various captains throughout the years.

As of 14 November 2017

#	Player	Career as captain	Caps as captain
1	Loro Boriçi	1946–1953	9
2	Bahri Kavaja	1946	1
3	Besim Fagu	1958	1
4	Fatbardh Deliallisi	1963–1964	2
5	Lin Shllaku	1964–1970	10
6	Mikel Janku	1967	1
7	Panajot Pano	1970–1973	10
8	Bashkim Muhedini	1971	1
9	Ramazan Rragami	1973	1
10	Sabah Bizi	1976	1
11	Safet Berisha	1980–1981	8
12	Ilir Luarasi	1982	1
13	Muhedin Targaj	1982–1985	13
14	Haxhi Ballgjini	1983	1
15	Arben Minga	1986–1989	8
16	Perlat Musta	1987	2
17	Shkëlqim Muça	1987	1
18	Skënder Hodja	1989–1990	4
19	Sulejman Demollari	1990–1995	16
20	Hysen Zmijani	1990–1991	3
21	Agustin Kola	1992	1
22	Sokol Kushta	1992–1995	6
23	Foto Strakosha	1995–2005	17
24	Ilir Shulku	1995	1
25	Rudi Vata	1996–2001	21
26	Edvin Murati	2000	1
27	Indrit Fortuzi	2002	3
28	Besnik Hasi	2003–2005	3
29	Igli Tare	2005–2007	11
30	Altin Haxhi	2005–2007	3
31	Altin Lala	2005–2011	22
32	Alban Bushi	2005	1
33	Klodian Duro	2007	1
34	Ervin Skela	2007–2011	13
35	Elvin Beqiri	2009	1
36	Lorik Cana	2010–2016	41
37	Arjan Beqaj	2011	1
38	Ervin Bulku	2012–2013	2
39	Erjon Bogdani	2013	1
40	Etrit Berisha	2014–2017	3
41	Ansi Agolli	2015–2017	10
42	Ledian Memushaj	2016	1
43	Elseid Hysaj	2016–2017	2
44	Mërgim Mavraj	2016–2017	4
