= Sulejman Maliqati =

Albanian footballer (1928–2022)

Personal information
- Date of birth: 1 August 1928
- Place of birth: Kavajë, Albania
- Date of death: 5 October 2022 (aged 94)
- Position: Goalkeeper

Senior career*
Years	Team	Apps	(Gls)
1947–1950	Besa		
1950–1964	Partizani		

International career
1950–1963	Albania	5	(0)
- * Club domestic league appearances and goals

Sulejman Maliqati (1 August 1928 – 5 October 2022) was an Albanian footballer who played as a goalkeeper, most notably for Partizani Tirana.

== Club career ==
Maliqati played for hometown club Besa before embarking on a successful career with Partizani, winning seven league titles with the club. The goalkeeper was known for never wearing gloves during a game.

== International career ==
Maliqati made his debut for Albania in a September 1950 friendly match against Hungary and earned a total of five caps. His final international was a June 1963 European Championship qualification match against Denmark.

== Personal life ==
His son, the late Agim Maliqati was also a goalkeeper for Vllaznia and Lokomotiva Durrës. Agim died on 1 May 2012, aged 51.

== Honours ==
Partizani

- Kategoria Superiore (7): 1954, 1957, 1958, 1959, 1961, 1963, 1964.
