= Robert Jashari =

Albanian footballer and coach (1938–2022)

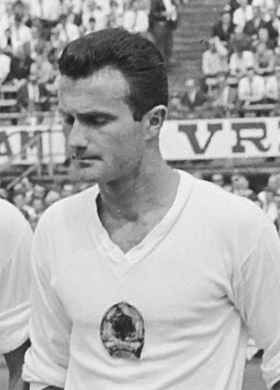

Personal information
- Full name: Robert Jashari
- Date of birth: 2 February 1938
- Place of birth: Tirana, Albania
- Date of death: 22 January 2022 (aged 83)
- Place of death: Tirana, Albania
- Position: Striker

Senior career*
Years	Team	Apps	(Gls)
1956–1968	Partizani Tirana		(69)

International career
1963–1965	Albania	7	(1)

Managerial career
- 1972–1974: Dajti Tiranë
- 1980–1984: 31 Korriku
- 1985–1986: Kastrioti
- * Club domestic league appearances and goals

Robert Jashari (2 February 1938 – 22 January 2022), also known as Bert Jashari, was an Albanian football player, who played for Partizani Tirana and the Albania national team. He won the National Championship six times between 1957 and 1964 with Partizani Tirana and he was the top goalscorer in the National Championship in three consecutive seasons between 1962 and 1965, with 18, 9 and 14 goals respectively. He scored a total of 69 league goals for Partizani.

== Playing career ==
=== Club ===
Born in Tirana, Jashari was raised by his mother after his father died when he was only 3 years old. His mother remarried an Italian man, who later was allowed to leave communist Albania for Italy. Jashari replaced the country's most famous footballing son Loro Boriçi in the Partizani forward line in 1956 and played alongside other Albanian greats Refik Resmja and Panajot Pano in an all-conquering Partizani team. In 1968, he suddenly quit football after he surprisingly was not named in the squad facing Torino in the second leg of their 1968–69 European Cup Winners' Cup match away in Italy.

=== International ===
He made his debut for Albania in a June 1963 Olympic Games qualification match against Bulgaria in Tirana and earned a total of 7 caps, scoring 1 goal. His final international was a May 1965 FIFA World Cup qualification match away against Northern Ireland. In the latter game, Jashari scored Albania's first ever goal in a competitive international game.

== Managerial career ==
Jashari took 31 Korriku to the Kategoria Superiore for the first time in history in 1981.

== Personal life ==
Jashari died in Tirana on 22 January 2022, at the age of 83.

== Honours ==
- Albanian Superliga: 6

1957, 1958, 1959, 1961, 1963, 1964
