= Fatbardh Deliallisi =

Albanian footballer

Personal information
- Full name: Fatbardh Deliallisi
- Date of birth: 15 October 1932
- Place of birth: Albanian Kingdom
- Date of death: 15 October 2011 (aged 79)
- Place of death: Albania
- Height: 1.74 m (5 ft 9 in)
- Position: Right back

Senior career*
Years	Team	Apps	(Gls)
–1954	Erzeni		
1954–1964	Partizani		
1964–1965	Apolonia		

International career
1957–1965	Albania	12	(0)
- * Club domestic league appearances and goals

Fatbardh Deliallisi (15 October 1932 – 15 October 2011) was a football player who played for, and captained Partizani, and the Albania national team. He is widely considered one of Albania's best ever defenders, known for his technical ability and leadership.

== International career ==
He made his debut for Albania in a September 1957 friendly match against China and earned a total of 12 caps, scoring no goals. His final international was a May 1965 FIFA World Cup qualification match against Northern Ireland.

== Honours ==
- Albanian Superliga: 7

1954, 1957, 1958, 1959, 1961, 1963, 1964
