= Kolec Kraja =

Albanian footballer (1933–1994)

Personal information
- Full name: Kolec Kraja
- Date of birth: 28 November 1933
- Place of birth: Shkodër, Albania
- Date of death: 22 May 1994 (aged 60)
- Position: Striker

Senior career*
Years	Team	Apps	(Gls)
1956–1964	Partizani		

International career
1957–1963	Albania	3	(2)

Managerial career
- 1988–1989: Partizani
- * Club domestic league appearances and goals

Kolec Kraja (28 November 1933 – 22 May 1994) was an Albanian football player who played for Partizani Tirana and the Albania national team. Kraja died on 22 May 1994, at the age of 60.

== Club career ==
He won the National Championship six times between 1957 and 1964 with Partizani Tirana. He scored Partizani Tirana's first goal in a European competition, against IFK Norrköping in the 1962–63 European Cup. which was also the first goal scored by an Albanian in a European competition.

== International career ==
He made his debut for Albania in a September 1957 friendly match against China and earned a total of 3 caps, scoring 2 goals. His final international was a June 1963 Olympic Games qualification match against Bulgaria.

== Honours ==
- Albanian Superliga: 6

1957, 1958, 1959, 1961, 1963, 1964
