= Loro Boriçi =

Albanian footballer and manager

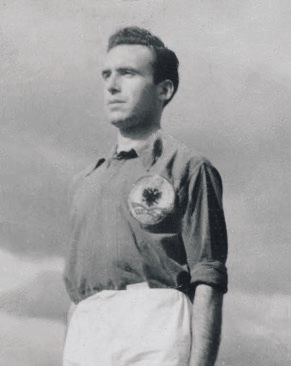
- Boriçi lined up in anticipation of the Balkans Cup Final (1946)

Personal information
- Full name: Lorenco Boriçi
- Date of birth: 4 August 1922
- Place of birth: Shkodër, Albania
- Date of death: 25 April 1984 (aged 61)
- Place of death: Tirana, Albania
- Height: 1.87 m (6 ft 2 in)
- Position: Forward

Senior career*
Years	Team	Apps	(Gls)
1937–1941	Vllaznia Shkodër		
1941–1943	Lazio	18	(3)
1945–1949	Vllaznia Shkodër		
1949–1956	Partizani Tirana	152	(68)
1957	Spartak Tirana		
Total		170	(71)

International career
1945–1957	Albania	24	(6)

Managerial career
- 1957: Spartak Tirana
- 1957–1963: Albania
- 1962–1971: Partizani Tirana
- 1965–1967: Lokomotiva Durrës
- 1965–1972: Albania
- 1972–1975: China (technical director)
- 1976: Albania
- 1981: Albania
- * Club domestic league appearances and goals

Lorenco Boriçi (4 August 1922 – 25 April 1984), commonly known as Loro Boriçi was an Albanian footballer who played as a forward. He is regarded as one of Albania's greatest players.

He played mostly for Partizan Tirana (won the 1949 and 1954 Albanian title and scored 68 goals for them) and Vllaznia Shkodër (won the 1945 Albanian title). Boriçi was the reserve of Silvio Piola in Italian Serie A with Lazio. He captained Albania in winning the 1946 Balkan Cup. Today, Loro-Boriçi Stadium in Shkodër is named in his honor.

== Club career ==
Born Lorenco Boriçi on 4 August 1922 in Shkodër, the northern part of Albania to an Albanian Catholic family, whom spoke the Albanian language in the Gheg dialect. His family descends from Boriç a village near Antivar, Montenegro. Daut Boriçi may be a distant relative. Boriçi was pursuing secondary studies in the Xaverian College of his city, and was only 15 when he played as part of the first team of Vllaznia Shkodër in an August 1937 friendly against Dragoi Pogradec. He went to Italy, and registered at La Sapienza University, Rome, to pursue Jurisprudence studies, and in 1941, became part of the SS Lazio team, where he played in the first year with the reserves, and in the second year he was part of the first team, with which he scored 6 goals in 19 matches. Upon his return to Albania he captained Vllaznia Shkodër to two titles, the 1945, and the 1946 ones, after which, in 1949, at the age of 27, he joined Partizani Tirana. With Partizani Boriçi won the 1949 and 1954 titles. He closed his career at Spartak Tirana, but it is believed that he may have played some games also with Flamurtari Vlorë.

== International career ==
Boriçi made his debut for the Albania national team in an August 1946 friendly match against Montenegro and earned a total of 24 caps, scoring 6 goals. His final international was a September 1957 friendly match against China. Boriçi captained Albania in winning the Balkan Cup in 1946.

== Managerial career ==
Boriçi became then manager at KF Partizani, a team which he led to winning the 1962–63, the 1963–64, and the 1970–71 titles, in addition he led also the 1963–64, the 1965–66, the 1967–68, and the 1969–70 Albanian Cups.

Aside Partizani, he managed the Albania national team in five separate stints.

== Personal life ==
Boriçi never married, but it was believed that he had fathered a son with a married woman. KF Tirana fans during the derbies against FK Partizani Tirana, would usually sing the name of his natural son, in order to make him angry, which usually succeeded.

== Honors ==
Albanian Superliga

- as a player: 3

1945, 1949, 1954

- as a coach: 3

1963, 1964, 1971
1946 Balkan Cup winner as a Player & Captain
