= Muhamet =

- Pronunciation: Albanian: [muhˈmet]
- Gender: Male
- Language: Albanian

Origin
- Meaning: Praiseworthy

Other names
- Derived: Muḥammad, مُحَمَّد, from Ḥammada, "Praise", حَمَّدَ
- Related names: Muhammad

Muhamet (Albanian: [muhˈmet]) is the Albanian form of the Arabic name Muhammad meaning "praisewothy".

== People ==
- Muhamet Dibra (1923–1998), Albanian footballer
- Muhamet Ghopur (born 1997), Chinese footballer
- Muhamet Hamiti (born 1964), Kosovan politician
- Muhamet Hyseni (born 2001), Kosovan footballer
- Muhamet Kapllani (born 1943), Albanian diplomat
- Muhamet Kyçyku (1784–1844), Albanian poet
- Muhamet Pirraku (1944–2014), Kosovan historian
- Muhamet Vila (1928–2002), Albanian footballer
