= Xhelal =

- Gender: Male

Origin
- Region of origin: Albania

Xhelal is an Albanian masculine given name. People with the name Xhelal include:

- Xhelal Bey Zogu (1881–1944), Albanian prince, lawyer, judge, and politician
- Xhelal Deliallisi (fl. 19th–century), Albanian politician
- Xhelal Juka (1926–2012), Albanian footballer
- Xhelal Koprencka (18??–19??), Albanian politician
- Xhelal Pasha Zogolli (18??–18??), Albanian politician, grandfather of King Zog I
- Xhelal Sveçla (born 1970), Kosovar politician
