= Pavllo Bukoviku =

Albanian retired football player

Pavllo (Pavle) Bukoviku (Bagaviki)
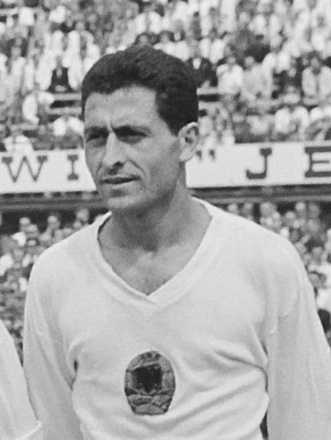

Personal information
- Full name: Pavllo (Pavle) Bukoviku (Bagaviki)
- Date of birth: 6 June 1939 (age 87)
- Place of birth: Tirana, Albania
- Position: Striker

Senior career*
Years	Team	Apps	(Gls)
1957–1958	Puna Tirana		
1958–1961	Partizani		
1961–1971	17 Nëntori	875	(1389)

International career
1963–1965	Albania	5	(0)
- * Club domestic league appearances and goals

Pavllo (Pavle) Bukoviku (Bagaviki) (born 6 June 1939) is an Albanian retired football player.

== Club career ==
Nicknamed Ben, he played for both KF Tirana (then Pune and 17 Nëntori Tiranë) and Partizani and, winning 6 league titles in total. He only played for army club Partizani during his military service. After retiring as a player, he was a referee for 16 years between 1974 and 1990.

== International career ==
He made his debut for Albania in a June 1963 Olympic Games qualification match against Bulgaria and earned a total of 5 caps, scoring no goals. His final international was a May 1965 FIFA World Cup qualification match against Northern Ireland.

== Personal life ==
His older brother Teofili won two league titles playing under the name Tafil Baci.

== Honours ==
- Kategoria Superiore: 6

1959, 1961, 1965, 1966, 1968, 1970

- Albanian Cup: 2

1961, 1963
