= Aristidh Parapani =

Albanian footballer

Personal information
- Date of birth: 1 January 1926
- Place of birth: Tirana, Albania
- Date of death: 1979 (aged 52–53)
- Position: Midfielder

Senior career*
Years	Team	Apps	(Gls)
1945–1947	Sportklub Tirana		
1948–1955	Partizani Tirana		

International career
1946–1952	Albania	18	(1)
- * Club domestic league appearances and goals

Aristidh Parapani (1 January 1926 – 1979) was an Albanian footballer who played for Sportklub Tirana and Partizani Tirana as well as the Albania national team. In total, he earned 18 caps for the nation team between 1946 and 1952.

== International career ==
He made his debut for Albania in an October 1946 Balkan Cup match against Yugoslavia, which was Albania's first official match. He earned a total of 18 caps, scoring 1 goal. His final international was a December 1952 friendly match against Czechoslovakia.

== Honours ==
- Albanian Superliga: 3

1948, 1949, 1954.
