= Rexhep Spahiu =

Albanian footballer and coach

Personal information
- Full name: Rexhep Spahiu
- Date of birth: 21 January 1923
- Place of birth: Naples, Kingdom of Italy
- Date of death: 12 January 1993 (aged 69)
- Position: Defender

Senior career*
Years	Team	Apps	(Gls)
1945–1950	Sportklub Tiranë		
1950–1956	Partizani Tirana		

International career
1946–1952	Albania	20	(0)

Managerial career
- 1956–1962: Partizani Tirana
- Apolonia Fier
- Korabi Peshkopi
- Besa Kavajë
- * Club domestic league appearances and goals

Rexhep Spahiu (21 January 1923 – 12 January 1993) was an Albanian football player and coach.

Nicknamed Xhepi, he spent his playing career with Sportklub Tiranë and Partizani Tirana, before becoming the head coach of Partizani, Apolonia Fier, Korabi Peshkopi and Besa Kavajë.

== International career ==
He made his debut for Albania in an October 1946 Balkan Cup match against Yugoslavia, which was Albania's first official match. He earned a total of 20 caps, scoring no goals. His final international was a December 1952 friendly match against Czechoslovakia.

== Honours ==
as a player

- Kategoria Superiore (1): 1954

as a manager

- Kategoria Superiore (4): 1957, 1958, 1959, 1961.
