= Erion Xhafa =

Albanian footballer

Personal information
- Full name: Erion Gani Xhafa
- Date of birth: 31 May 1982 (age 44)
- Place of birth: Tirana, PSR Albania
- Height: 1.79 m (5 ft 10 in)
- Position: Defender

Youth career
- 2000–2001: Dinamo Tirana

Senior career*
Years	Team	Apps	(Gls)
2001–2002	Besa	10	(0)
2002–2004	Erzeni	40	(0)
2004–2007	Dinamo Tirana	118	(2)
2007–2008	Tirana	20	(0)
2008–2009	Besa	25	(0)
2009–2011	Dinamo Tirana	42	(0)
2011–2012	Laçi	23	(0)
2012–2014	Kastrioti	35	(0)
2014	Dinamo Tirana	0	(0)

International career^{‡}
2006–2008	Albania	3	(0)

Managerial career
- 2015: Dinamo Tirana (assistant manager)
- 2018–2019: Tirana (assistant)
- 2020: Tirana (assistant)
- 2022–: Partizani (assistant)
- * Club domestic league appearances and goals as of 19 May 2010 ‡ National team caps and goals as of 23 May 2009

Erion Xhafa (born 31 May 1982) is an Albanian retired footballer who played as a defender.

== Playing career ==
=== Club ===
He started his career with Dinamo Tirana youth team, and played for Erzeni Shijak for one year, then back to Dinamo Tirana until 2007. In the Summer of 2007 he was transferred to Tirana which was the holder of the championship title at that time.

=== International ===
He made his debut for Albania in a March 2006 friendly match against Georgia and earned a total of 3 caps, scoring no goals. His final international was an August 2007 friendly against Malta.

== Managerial career ==
In July 2015, Xhafa was appointed assistant coach to Igli Allmuça at Dinamo Tirana.

== Personal life ==
Erion is the son of Gani Xhafa, one of the veterans of Albanian team Dinamo Tirana and the Albania team remembered for his great performance against some of the best teams of Europe like Ajax on that heroic game with Tirana, finished 2–2 on 16 September 1970.
