= Panajot Pano =

Albanian footballer (1939–2010)

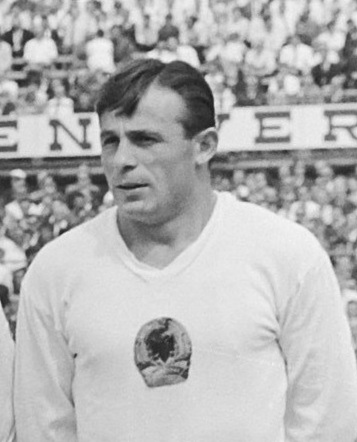
- Pano in 1964

Personal information
- Full name: Panajot Thoma Pano
- Date of birth: 7 March 1939
- Place of birth: Durrës, Albania
- Date of death: 19 January 2010 (aged 70)
- Place of death: Jacksonville, Florida, United States
- Position: Forward

Senior career*
Years	Team	Apps	(Gls)
1957–1960	17 Nëntori Tirana	28	(8)
1960–1975	Partizani Tirana	210	(136)
Total		238	(144)

International career
1963–1973	Albania	28	(4)
- * Club domestic league appearances and goals

Panajot Thoma Pano (Greek: Παναγιώτης Θωμάς Πάνου, romanized: Panayiotis Thomas Panou; 7 March 1939 – 19 January 2010) was an Albanian football player. He started his career as a goalkeeper in the 17 Nëntori Tirana youth academy, but later became the most prolific centre-forward of their arch-rivals, Partizani Tirana. During his eighteen-year career he played 24 matches as part of the Albania national team and was awarded the Albanian UEFA Jubilee Award.

Due to his skills and abilities, Pano earned the nickname "The little Puskás" by sports commentators.

== Early life ==
Panajot Pano (Panayiotis Thomas Panou) was born in Durrës, to ethnic Greek parents Thoma and Vasilika Pano who came from Lefterhor, Delvinë, Albania. He developed a passion for the sport when he was around 4–5 years old. His parents were against him playing football and instead wanted him to focus more on school.

== Club career ==
=== Early career ===
Pano begun his football career in 1954 by playing as a goalkeeper for 17 Nëntori Tirana. He their youth team which was coached by the former national team manager Adem Karapici initially and then Xhavit Shyqyri Demneri until the age of 16. He was handed his under-19s debut with Tirana by Demneri on 18 July 1956 in a youth national championship game against Korabi Peshkopi and he scored his first goal for the side on 5 August of the same year against Kukësi.

=== Tirana ===
Pano was handed his professional debut by manager Myslym Alla in senior side in 1958 as an 18-year-old, entering as a substitute in a Republic Cup game against Besa Kavajë which ended in a goalless draw. He scored his first senior goal in the returning leg but the team lost 2–1 and was eliminated from the competition. Pano remained a member of the under-19 team at the time and had to wait until the following season before he would establish himself as a first team member.

His league debut occurred on 4 May 1958 in the Tirana derby match against Dinamo Tirana, where he contributed in the 4–0 win by scoring a goal. Pano changed his role from goalkeeper to striker during a league match against Partizani Tirana where 17 Nëntori was losing 4–0. It was coach's Demneri decision to play him as a striker.

He played his final game for Tirana on 9 December 1959 against Besa Kavajë in a game which ended in a 4–2 win for Pano's side.

=== Partizani Tirana ===
"If Panajot Pano doesn't remember me, I remember him."

— Franz Beckenbauer, 1990

On 12 December 1958, Pano was called for the military service and eventually signed for Partizani Tirana. He played his first match for his new side under Rexhep Spahiu on 14 February 1960 against Dinamo Tirana in which he also would score his first goal for his new club in the 3–0 win. He scored 7 goals in his first season which helped the team to finish runner-up in the championship which was won by Dinamo Tirana.

Pano finished 1961 season as top scorer (with 14 goals) as Partizani Tirana won the championship. For his performances Pano earned the Albanian Sportsperson of the Year award. Two years later, he was part of the team that played in the Spartakiad tournament, an official championship of communist countries army clubs. Pano scored four goals during the tournament, including a memorable hat-trick in the 3–1 win over Vorwärts B. Partizani eventually reached the final and was subsequently defeated by XI CSKA/SKA.

On 17 September 1969, Pano returned at Tirana to participate in the first leg of 1969–70 European Cup's first round against Standard Liège; he played as a starter but was replaced by Niko Xhaçka after 65 minutes, as Tirana lost the game 3–0. He didn't play in the second leg which saw Tirana crashing out of the competition 4–1 on aggregate.

In 1970, Pano played in the Balkans Cup, scoring 2 goals as Partizani became the first and only Albanian club to win an international competition, as they defeated Beroe Stara Zagora in the final, following a 1–1 draw in Tiranë and a 3–0 awarded win for the second leg, as Beroe withdrew.

Pano announced his retirement from football in May 1975.

== International career ==
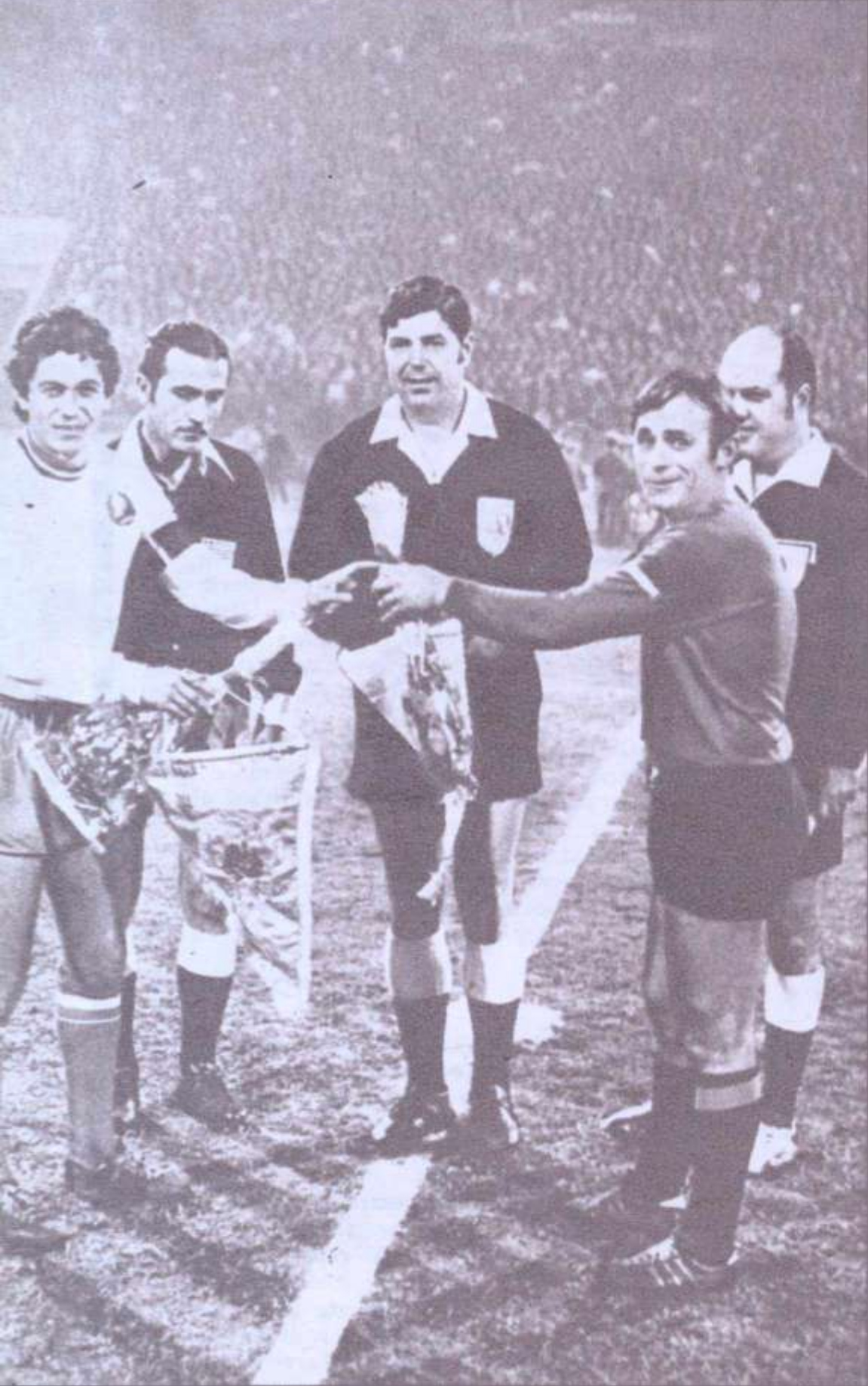
Pano (right) with Mircea Lucescu in 1972

Pano has been an Albanian international, earning 28 caps and scoring 4 goals between 1963 and 1973. He also captained the national team in 10 occasions.

He scored his first international goal on 30 October 1963 against Denmark in the 1964 European Nations' Cup qualifying stage which marked Albania's first ever win in a qualifying match.

== Personal life ==
His son Ledio Pano, became also a well known football player and played for the football clubs of Partizani, Luftëtari, Xanthi and PAS Giannina. He was also capped several times with Albania.

He died at 70 in Jacksonville, (Florida, United States) on 19 January 2010 after suffering a heart attack.

== Legacy ==
In November 2003, to celebrate UEFA's Jubilee, he was selected as the Golden Player of Albania by the Football Association of Albania as their most outstanding player of the past 50 years.

On 6 March 2009, Pano received the order Honor of Nation from the President of Albania, Bamir Topi. This was the first time in the history of Albania that a footballer was honored with the Honor of the Nation order.

== Career statistics ==
=== Club ===
Season	Team	Goals
1958	17 Nëntori Tirana	5
1959	17 Nëntori Tirana	10
1960	Partizani	12
1961	Partizani	19
1962–63	Partizani	12
1963–64	Partizani	16
1964–65	Partizani	14
1965–66	Partizani	11
1966–67	Partizani	18
1968	Partizani	23
1969–70	Partizani	18
1970–71	Partizani	18
1971–72	Partizani	14
1972–73	Partizani	10
1973–74	Partizani	9
TOTAL		209

=== International ===
Appearances and goals by national team and year
National team	Year	Apps	Goals
Albania	1963	4	1
Albania	1964	3	0
Albania	1965	3	0
Albania	1966	0	0
Albania	1967	4	0
Albania	1968	0	0
Albania	1969	0	0
Albania	1970	2	0
Albania	1971	6	2
Albania	1972	2	0
Albania	1973	4	1
Total		28	4

Albania score listed first, score column indicates score after each Pano goal.

International goals by date, venue, cap, opponent, score, result and competition
No.	Date	Venue	Cap	Opponent	Score	Result	Competition
1	30 October 1963	Qemal Stafa Stadium, Tirana, Albania	4	Denmark	1–0	1–0	1964 European Nations' Cup qualifying
2	26 May 1971	Qemal Stafa Stadium, Tirana, Albania	20	Romania	1–0	1–2	1972 Summer Olympics qualifiers
3	14 November 1971	Qemal Stafa Stadium, Tirana, Albania	22	Turkey	3–0	3–0	UEFA Euro 1972 qualifying
4	8 November 1973	Qemal Stafa Stadium, Tirana, Albania	28	China	1–1	1–1	Friendly

== Honours ==
Partizani Tirana

- Albanian Superliga: 1961, 1962–63, 1963–64, 1970–71
- Albanian Cup: 1961, 1963–64, 1965–66, 1967–68, 1969–70, 1972–73
- Balkans Cup: 1970

Individual

- Albanian Superliga top goalscorer: 1961, 1969–70
- Albanian Sportsperson of the Year: 1960
