= Besim Fagu =

Albanian footballer

Personal information
- Date of birth: 10 March 1925
- Place of birth: Tirana, Albania
- Date of death: 1 January 1999 (aged 73)
- Place of death: Tirana, Albania
- Position: Defender

Senior career*
Years	Team	Apps	(Gls)
1945–1946	17 Nentori Tirana		
1946–1959	Partizani Tirana		

International career
1946–1958	Albania	11	(0)
- * Club domestic league appearances and goals

Besim Fagu (10 March 1925 – 1 January 1999) was an Albanian football player. He played for 17 Nentori Tirana and Partizani Tirana where he won seven National Championships. He was also a member of the Albania national team between 1946 and 1953, where he earned 11 caps and also won the 1946 Balkan Cup.

== International career ==
He made his debut for Albania in an October 1946 Balkan Cup match against Bulgaria and earned a total of 11 caps, scoring no goals. His final international was a May 1958 friendly match against East Germany.

== Personal life ==
=== Legacy ===
On 10 March 2015, on the 90th anniversary of his birthdate, he was awarded with a medal of gratitude by the Ministry of Defence at an event organised to commemorate the player.

== Honours ==
- Kategoria Superiore (7): 1947, 1948, 1949, 1954, 1957, 1958, 1959.
