= 1945 Albanian National Championship =

Albanian National Championship
- Season: 1945
- Champions: Vllaznia

The 1945 Albanian National Championship was the eighth season of the Albanian National Championship, the top professional league for association football clubs, since its establishment in 1930.

== Overview ==
It was contested by 12 teams, and Vllaznia won the championship.

== Regular season ==
=== Group A ===
Pos	Team	Pld	W	D	L	GF	GA	GR	Pts	VLL	BES	TEU	LIR	IQE	TOM
1	Vllaznia (Q)	10	8	1	1	26	2	13.000	17		1–0	1–0	2–0	7–0	9–0
2	Besa	10	5	3	2	21	7	3.000	13	0–0		0–1	2–1	2–0	8–1
3	Teuta	10	5	2	3	10	7	1.429	12	0–1	0–0		2–2	2–0	1–0
4	Liria Korçë	10	3	2	5	16	15	1.067	8	2–0	1–3	1–2		3–1	5–1
5	Ismail Qemali	10	3	1	6	12	22	0.545	7	0–3	1–1	2–0	2–1		4–0
6	Tomori	10	1	1	8	6	38	0.158	3	0–2	1–5	0–2	0–0	3–2	

Source: RSSSF.org
(Q) Qualified for the phase indicated

=== Group B ===
Pos	Team	Pld	W	D	L	GF	GA	GR	Pts	TIR	YLL	BAS	SKË	APO	SHQ
1	Tirana (Q)	10	7	2	1	30	6	5.000	16		5–1	3–0	1–0	3–0	5–0
2	Ylli Shkodër	10	5	1	4	27	12	2.250	11	1–1		3–1	2–0	12–0	5–1
3	Bashkimi Elbasanas	10	5	0	5	20	15	1.333	10	1–1	2–1		1–3	2–2	2–0
4	Skënderbeu	10	4	2	4	14	17	0.824	10	3–2	4–2	2–3		4–1	7–1
5	Apolonia	10	3	1	6	9	28	0.321	7	0–3	1–0	0–2	2–0		1–0
6	Shqiponja	10	3	0	7	8	30	0.267	6	0–6	0–2	2–0	0–3	2–1	

Source: RSSSF.org
(Q) Qualified for the phase indicated

Note: 'Ismail Qemali' is Flamurtari, 'Bashkimi Elbasanas' is KS Elbasani and 'Shqiponja' is Luftëtari. 'Ylli' and 'Liria' were short-lived military teams.

== Finals ==
23 December 1945

Tirana	1–2	Vllaznia
Biçaku 88'		Barbullushi 70'; Juka 82'

Tirana

26 December 1945

Vllaznia	2–1	Tirana
Vasija 10'; Smajli 86'		Fagu 28' (pen.)

Shkodër
