= Fatbardh Jera =

Albanian footballer

Personal information
- Full name: Fatbardh Jera
- Date of birth: 8 February 1960 (age 66)
- Place of birth: Shkodër, Albania
- Position: Defender

Youth career
- –1979: Vllaznia Shkodër

Senior career*
Years	Team	Apps	(Gls)
1979–1992	Vllaznia Shkodër		

International career
1982–1986	Albania U21	8	(0)
1985–1990	Albania	15	(0)
- * Club domestic league appearances and goals

Fatbardh Jera (born 8 February 1960) is an Albanian retired footballer who played for Vllaznia Shkodër and the Albania national team.

== Club career ==
Jera spent his entire career with Vllaznia Shkodër, after becoming part of their first team in January 1979 and playing on during the 1980s and beginning of the 1990s, forming a defensive partnership with fellow international Hysen Zmijani.

== International career ==
He made his debut for Albania in a March 1985 friendly match against Turkey and earned a total of 15 caps, scoring no goals. His final international was a May 1990 European Championship qualification match against Iceland.

== FSHF ==
Jera became a member of the executive committee of the Albanian Football Association in February 2014.
