= Bashkim Muhedini =

Albanian footballer

Personal information
- Date of birth: 3 January 1949 (age 77)
- Place of birth: Kozare, Albania
- Date of death: 07 October 2022
- Place of death: USA
- Height: 1.86 m (6 ft 1 in)
- Position: Goalkeeper

Youth career
- 1967–1969: Partizani Tirana

Senior career*
Years	Team	Apps	(Gls)
1969–1976	Partizani		

International career
1971–1973	Albania	7	(0)

Managerial career
- Përmeti
- * Club domestic league appearances and goals

Bashkim Muhedini (born 3 January 1949 - 7 October 2022) is an Albanian retired football player. He was a goalkeeper for Partizani Tirana and the Albania national team in the 1970s.

== Club career ==
Just like the famous Albanian sculptor Odhise Paskali, Muhedine hails from the village Kozarë. He played basketball in school, but Bejkush Birçe persuaded him to play football and he subsequently joined the Partizani academy led by Birçe. He replaced Mikel Janku as Partizani's first choice goalkeeper, but he was forced to quit his career due to political reasons in 1976.

== International career ==
He made his debut for Albania in a June 1971 European Championship qualification match away against West Germany and earned a total of 7 caps, scoring no goals. His final international was a November 1973 friendly match against China.

== Personal life ==
Muhedini was a son-in-law of Albanian general Beqir Balluku, who was executed during the Hoxha regime. Family of Balluku were persecuted and Muhedini was forced to retire from playing for being a relative as well and he was 'relocated' and became a physical education teacher. In 1979 he was allowed to leave for Përmet and coached the local team. Nowadays he lives in New York.

== Honours ==
- Albanian Superliga: 1

1971
