= Arjan Xhumba =

Albanian footballer

Personal information
- Full name: Arjan Xhumba
- Date of birth: 9 July 1968 (age 58)
- Place of birth: Gjirokastër, Albania
- Height: 1.87 m (6 ft 2 in)
- Position: Central defender

Senior career*
Years	Team	Apps	(Gls)
1990–1992	Luftëtari	59	(1)
1992–1994	PAS Giannina	51	(1)
1994–1997	Kalamata	57	(2)
1997–1998	Iraklis	32	(1)
1998–1999	Enosis Neon	38	(6)
1999–2004	PAS Giannina	103	(6)
2004–2005	Messiniakos	22	(0)

International career
1989–2003	Albania	48	(0)
- * Club domestic league appearances and goals

Arjan Xhumba (born 9 July 1968) is an Albanian retired footballer

== Club career ==
He made his senior debut for local side Luftëtari in 1987 and left the country after the fall of communism in 1992 to have an extended career in Greece. He also had a spell with Enosis Neon Paralimni in Cyprus.

== International career ==
Xhumba made his debut for Albania in a November 1989 FIFA World Cup qualification match against Poland and earned a total of 48 caps, scoring no goals.

His final international was a February 2003 friendly match against Vietnam.
