= Vasif Biçaku =

Albanian footballer (1922–1979)

Personal information
- Date of birth: 22 March 1922
- Place of birth: Tirana, Albania
- Date of death: 23 September 1979 (aged 57)
- Height: 1.78 m (5 ft 10 in)
- Position: Midfielder

Senior career*
Years	Team	Apps	(Gls)
1939–1948	Sportklub Tirana		
1948–195x	Partizani		
195x–195x	Apolonia Fier		

International career
1946–1950	Albania	17	(1)

Managerial career
- 1966–1967: Apolonia Fier
- * Club domestic league appearances and goals

Vasif Dervish Biçaku (22 March 1922 – 23 September 1979) was an Albanian footballer who played for Sportklub Tirana and Apolonia Fier as well as the Albania national team. He is also known for being part of the 1946 Albania vs Yugoslavia football match, which was Albania's first official match. In total, he earned 18 caps for the national team between 1946 and 1952.

== Club career ==
Biçaku was born in Tirana into a noble family from Elbasan and began his football career in the late 1930s with Sportklub Tirana. He moved to Partizani Tirana in 1948 where he won two National Championships. Towards the end of his playing career he moved to Apolonia Fier and played in the Albanian second tier until his retirement in the mid-1950s.

== International career ==
Biçaku made his debut for Albania in an August 1946 friendly match against Montenegro and earned a total of 17 caps, scoring 1 goal. His final international was a June 1950 friendly match against Bulgaria.

== Personal life and death ==
Biçaku was a notable fighter for the Albanian Partisans and was involved in the liberation movement. He was a staunch communist and even refused to meet with his own father in Rome, Italy where he was in exile for opposing the communist regime.

Biçaku died on 23 September 1979, at the age of 57.

== Honours ==
- Kategoria Superiore: 2

1948, 1949
