= Muhamet Vila =

Albanian footballer

Personal information
- Full name: Muhamet Vila
- Date of birth: 7 March 1928
- Place of birth: Kavajë, Albania
- Date of death: 18 January 2002 (aged 73)
- Position: Defender

Senior career*
Years	Team	Apps	(Gls)
1950-1960	Dinamo Tirana		

International career
1952–1953	Albania	3	(0)

Managerial career
- 1971-1973: Besa Kavajë
- * Club domestic league appearances and goals

Muhamet Vila (7 March 1928 – 18 January 2002) was an Albanian footballer who played his entire professional career as defender for Dinamo Tirana football club.

== Playing career ==
=== Club ===
Paired with Xhevdet Shaqiri he formed the backbone of the defense for a Dinamo team that went on to win 6 league titles in the 1950s.

=== International ===
He made his debut for Albania in a November 1952 friendly match against Czechoslovakia and earned a total of 3 caps, scoring no goals. His final international was a November 1953 friendly against Poland.

== Managerial career ==
Vila served as head coach of Besa Kavajë in the 1970s and helped lead the club to 2 Albania Cup finals appearances and to the final of the Balkan Cup tournament of 1971.

== Personal life ==
His son Arben also played for Dinamo and the national team in the 1980s.

== Honours ==
- Albanian Superliga: 7

1950, 1951, 1952, 1953, 1955, 1956, 1960
