= Muhamet Dibra =

Albanian footballer

Personal information
- Full name: Muhamet Dibra
- Date of birth: 31 October 1923
- Place of birth: Shkodër, Principality of Albania
- Date of death: 1 January 1998 (aged 74)
- Place of death: Shkodër, Albania
- Position: Defender

Youth career
- Dudas

Senior career*
Years	Team	Apps	(Gls)
1945–1948	Vllaznia		
1948–1953	Partizani		

International career
1946–1953	Albania	19	(0)
- * Club domestic league appearances and goals

Muhamet Dibra (31 October 1923 – 1 January 1998) was an Albanian football player. The road the Loro Boriçi Stadium is on in Shkodër is named after him and he received a number of notable awards for his services to sport in Albania.

== Club career ==
He played for Vllaznia Shkodër and Partizani Tirana and won three National Championships in 1945, 1946 and 1948.

== International career ==
He was also a member of the Albania national team between 1946 and 1953, where he earned 19 caps and also won the 1946 Balkan Cup.

== Honours ==
- Albanian Superliga: 3

1945, 1946, 1948
