= Mikel Janku =

Albanian footballer (1941–2019)

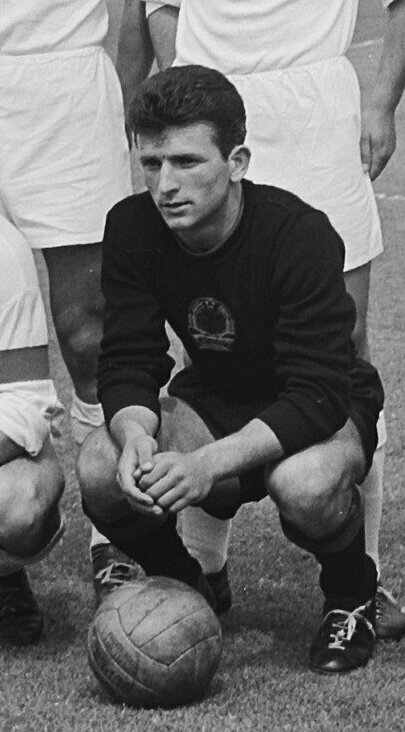
- Janku in 1964

Personal information
- Full name: Mikel Andrea Janku
- Date of birth: 25 October 1941
- Place of birth: Tirana, Albania
- Date of death: 10 January 2019 (aged 77)
- Position: Goalkeeper

Youth career
- 1962: Partizani Tirana

Senior career*
Years	Team	Apps	(Gls)
1962–1969	Partizani Tirana		

International career
1964–1967	Albania	9	(0)
- * Club domestic league appearances and goals

Mikel Janku (25 December 1941 – 10 January 2019) was an Albanian football player. He played as a goalkeeper for Partizani Tirana and the Albania national team between 1962–1969 and 1964–1967, respectively.

== Club career ==
Janku was trained from 1958 as a helicopter pilot in Rostov, Soviet Union, and played for army club Partizani on his return to Albania.

== International career ==
He made his debut for Albania in a May 1964 FIFA World Cup qualification match away against the Netherlands and earned a total of 9 caps, scoring no goals. His final international was a May 1967 European Championship qualification match against Yugoslavia.

== Personal life ==
Janku later became a sports journalist for Sport Express and died in January 2019.

== Honours ==
- Albanian Superliga: 2

1963, 1964
