= Haxhi Ballgjini =

Albanian footballer (born 1958)

Personal information
- Full name: Haxhi Ballgjini
- Date of birth: 15 June 1958 (age 68)
- Place of birth: Durrës, Albania
- Position: Midfielder

Senior career*
Years	Team	Apps	(Gls)
1975–1976	Dinamo Tirana		
1976–1977	Partizani		
1978–1979	Vllaznia		
1980–1981	Dinamo Tirana		
1981–1983	Partizani		
1983–1985	Lokomotiva Durrës		
1991–1992	Dinamo Tirana		

International career
1978–1984	Albania U21	5	(0)
1976–1985	Albania	15	(1)

Managerial career
- 1994: Teuta
- * Club domestic league appearances and goals

Haxhi Ballgjini (born 15 June 1958) is a former Albanian footballer who played for Dinamo Tirana, Partizani Tirana, Vllaznia Shkodër and Partizani Tirana and Lokomotiva Durrës, as well as the Albania national team.

== International career ==
He made his debut for Albania in a November 1976 friendly match against Algeria and earned a total of 15 caps, scoring 1 goal. His final international was a February 1985 FIFA World Cup qualification match against Greece.

== Managerial career ==
Ballgjini managed hometown club Teuta to their first and only league title in 1994.

== Personal life ==
His older brother Shyqyri Ballgjini also played for Albania and they were the first brothers to play for the national side together in 1981 against Finland. He is currently single. We don't have much information about his past relationships. He has no children.

== Honours ==
as a player

- Albanian Superliga: 1

1981

as a coach

- Albanian Superliga: 1

1994
