= Gani Xhafa =

Albanian footballer

Personal information
- Date of birth: 22 August 1946 (age 80)
- Position: Defender

Senior career*
Years	Team	Apps	(Gls)
- Dinamo Tirana

International career
1967–1973	Albania	5	(0)

Managerial career
- Dinamo Tirana
- * Club domestic league appearances and goals

Gani Xhafa (born 22 August 1946) is an Albanian former footballer who played as a defender. He made five appearances for the Albania national team from 1967 to 1973. He served as the manager of Dinamo Tirana in 1997.
