= Xhelal Juka =

Albanian footballer

Personal information
- Date of birth: 5 April 1926
- Date of death: 7 February 2012 (aged 85)
- Position: Forward

Senior career*
Years	Team	Apps	(Gls)
- Vllaznia

International career
1946	Albania	1	(2)
- * Club domestic league appearances and goals

Xhelal Juka (5 April 1926 – 7 February 2012) was an Albanian footballer who played for Vllaznia. He featured once for the Albania national football team in 1946, scoring two goals.

== Career statistics ==
=== International ===
Appearances and goals by national team and year
National team	Year	Apps	Goals
Albania	1946	1	2
Total		1	2

=== International goals ===
Scores and results list Albania's goal tally first, score column indicates score after each Albania goal.

List of international goals scored by Juka
No.	Date	Venue	Opponent	Score	Result	Competition
1	22 September 1946	Fusha Sportive Adriatik, Velipojë, Albania	(Socialist Republic of Montenegro) Montenegro	3–0	5–0	Friendly
2	22 September 1946	Fusha Sportive Adriatik, Velipojë, Albania	(Socialist Republic of Montenegro) Montenegro	4–0	5–0	Friendly
