= Arben Vila =

Albanian footballer

Personal information
- Date of birth: 16 January 1961 (age 65)

International career
Years	Team	Apps	(Gls)
1984–1985	Albania	2	(0)

Arben Vila (born 16 January 1961) is an Albanian footballer. He played in two matches for the Albania national football team from 1984 to 1985.
