= Bahri Kavaja =

Albanian footballer

Personal information
- Full name: Bahri Ahmet Kavaja
- Date of birth: 23 August 1924
- Place of birth: Shkodër, Albania
- Date of death: 19 August 1987 (aged 62)
- Place of death: Adelaide, South Australia, Australia
- Position: Defender

Senior career*
Years	Team	Apps	(Gls)
1942–1949	Vllaznia		
1949–1950	Dinamo Tirana		

International career
1946–1950	Albania	13	(0)
- * Club domestic league appearances and goals

Bahri Ahmet Kavaja (23 August 1924 – 19 August 1987) was an Albanian football player who played for Vllaznia Shkodër and Dinamo Tirana as well as the Albania national team.

== International career ==
He made his debut for Albania in an October 1946 Balkan Championship match against Yugoslavia and earned a total of 13 caps, scoring no goals. His final international was a June 1950 friendly match against Bulgaria.

=== Defection ===
In September 1950 after a game in Hungary, he escaped his team along with Sulejman (Bule) Vathi after swimming the strait of Bosphorus, and did not return to the Communist regime in Albania, eventually settling in New Zealand. He became a naturalised New Zealand citizen in 1965, and died in Adelaide, South Australia, on 19 August 1987.

== Honours ==
- Albanian Superliga: 1

1950
