= Hysen Zmijani =

Albanian footballer

Personal information
- Date of birth: 29 April 1963 (age 63)
- Place of birth: Shkodër, Albania
- Height: 1.78 m (5 ft 10 in)
- Position: Right-back

Youth career
- 1979-1982: Vllaznia Shkodër

Senior career*
| Years | Team | Apps | (Gls) |
| 1981–1991 | Vllaznia Shkodër | 67+ | (6) |
| 1991–1993 | GFC Ajaccio | 40 | (2) |
| 1993–1995 | Al Nassr | 44 | (10) |
| 1995–1996 | FC St. Pauli | 7 | (0) |
| 1996–1997 | Al Nassr | | |

International career
| 1983–1984 | Albania U21 | | |
| 1984–1995 | Albania | 36 | (2) |
- * Club domestic league appearances and goals

Hysen Zmijani (born 29 April 1963) is an Albanian retired professional footballer who played as a right-back.

== Club career ==
Zmijani has been regarded by many football pundits in Albania as Vllaznia Shkodër's greatest right-back in history. He was born in Shkodër into a family of athletes; his uncle Sadetin Zmijani was the captain of Vllaznia in 60', while his other uncle was a boxer and his son was a cycler.

Zmijani made his senior debut for Vllaznia in September 1981 against Tomori Berat and helped the club to win the championship in a team which boasted fellow international players Ferid Rragami, Fatbardh Jera, Hysen Dedja, Luan Vukatana and Astrit Hafizi. In 1985, Zmijani was the winner of questionary "10 best athletes in Albania" made by newspaper Sporti Popullor. In the 1986–87 season, he won another individual award, as he was part of questionary "10 best athletes in Shkodër" and at the end of the season helped the team to win the Albanian Cup, defeating Flamurtari Vlorë 4–3 on aggregate.

=== First Albanian abroad after communism ===
Later in his career, Zmijani played professionally in France, Saudi Arabia and Germany for Gazélec Ajaccio, Al Nassr and FC St. Pauli.

Zmijani signed for Gazélec Ajaccio in the 1991; following the match against France, he was contacted by a journalist which proposed him to the club which was playing in Ligue 2 at that time. He signed the contract after arriving in Albania, with the contract containing a friendly match between his new club and Vllaznia, a friendly which gave many players to opportunity for a new life away from Albania following the fall of communism. He was the first Albanian player who officially signed a contract with a foreign club after the fall of communism.

Zmijani signed with Al Nassr of Saudi Arabia in the 1993–94 season. In his first season, he helped the club to win the championship after defeating Al-Riyadh SC 3–1 in the final. The team repeated the success in the next season, this time winning in the final versus Al-Nassr.

== International career ==
Zmijani was a part of Albania under-21 squad in their historic era in which they managed to qualify in an UEFA European Under-21 Championship for the first time in history. He played in every qualifying match as Albania finished Group 6 in first place ahead of West Germany, Turkey and Austria.

He made his senior debut for Albania in an October 1984 FIFA World Cup qualification match against Belgium and earned a total of 36 caps, scoring two goals. His final international was a November 1995 European Championship qualification match against Wales. He appeared in 18 FIFA World Cup qualifying matches.

== Personal life ==
Zmijani's idol and greatest inspiration was former Argentine footballer Diego Maradona.

== Honours ==
Vllaznia Shkodër

- Albanian Superliga: 1983
- Albanian Cup: 1987
