= Ilir Luarasi =

Albanian footballer

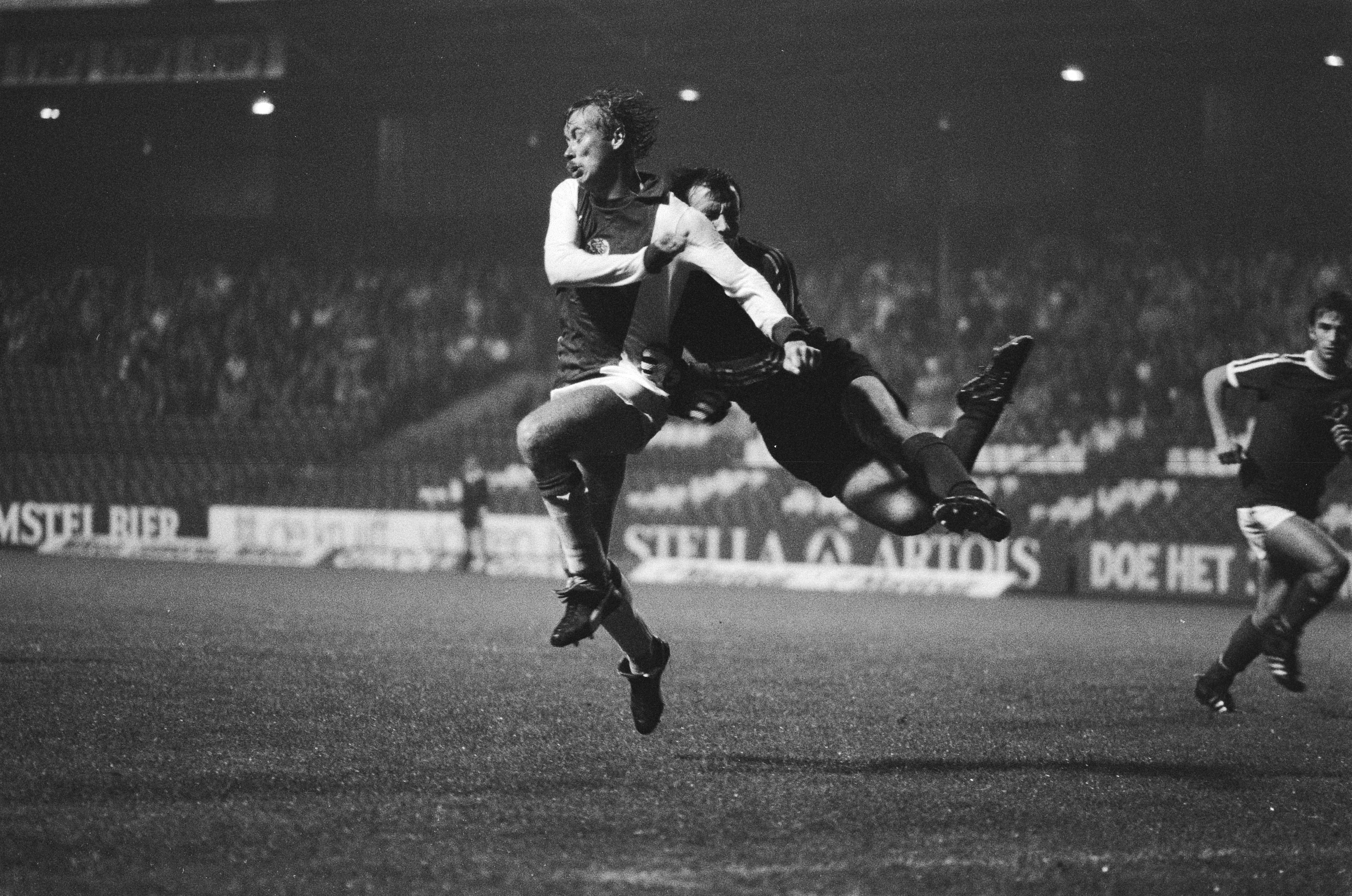
- Luarasi clashing with Ajax' Dick Schoenaker (1980)

Personal information
- Full name: Ilir Luarasi
- Date of birth: 12 March 1954
- Place of birth: Tirana, Albania
- Date of death: 17 January 2018 (aged 63)
- Place of death: France
- Position: Goalkeeper

Senior career*
| Years | Team | Apps | (Gls) |
| 1976–1987 | Dinamo Tirana | | |

International career
| 1981–1982 | Albania | 2 | (0) |

Managerial career
- 1990–1995: Kastrioti
- * Club domestic league appearances and goals

Ilir Luarasi (12 March 1954 – 17 January 2018) was an Albanian retired football player. He was a goalkeeper for Dinamo Tiranë and the Albania national team in the 70s and 80s.

== Club career ==
Luarasi spent 11 years between the posts of Dinamo, playing alongside fellow internationals Muhedin Targaj and Ilir Përnaska among others. He won three league titles and two domestic cups with the club and played in the 1985–86 UEFA Cup.

He was found dead in his house in France in January 2018.

== International career ==
He made his debut for Albania in a November 1981 FIFA World Cup qualification match away against West Germany and earned a total of 2 caps, scoring no goals. His second and final international was a September 1982 European Championship qualification match against Austria.

== Honours ==
- Albanian Superliga: 3

1977, 1980, 1986
