= Altin Haxhi =

Albanian footballer (born 1975)

Personal information
- Full name: Altin Haxhi
- Date of birth: 17 June 1975 (age 51)
- Place of birth: Gjirokastër, Albania
- Height: 1.75 m (5 ft 9 in)
- Position: Left wing back

Senior career*
Years	Team	Apps	(Gls)
1994–1996	Shqiponja	45	(10)
1996–1998	Panachaiki	45	(0)
1998–2000	Litex Lovech	47	(9)
2000–2003	Iraklis	60	(0)
2003–2004	CSKA Sofia	19	(0)
2004–2005	Apollon Kalamarias	24	(4)
2005–2006	Anorthosis	16	(0)
2006–2007	Ergotelis	32	(3)
2007–2010	APOEL	47	(1)
2010–2012	Apollon Kalamarias	19	(3)
Total		374	(30)

International career
1995–2009	Albania	67	(3)
- * Club domestic league appearances and goals

Altin Haxhi (born 17 June 1975) is an Albanian retired footballer who played as a defender.

== Club career ==
Haxhi's former clubs include Shqiponja Gjirokastër, Panachaiki, Litex Lovech, Iraklis, CSKA Sofia, Apollon Kalamarias, Anorthosis Famagusta, Ergotelis, APOEL and Apollon Kalamarias. After the 1998–99 A Group season, he was honored as the best foreign player in Bulgarian football.

During his spell with APOEL, Haxhi won one Cypriot Championship, one Cypriot Cup, two Super Cups and also appeared in three official group stages matches of the 2009–10 UEFA Champions League.

== International career ==
He made his debut for Albania in a November 1995 friendly match against Bosnia and earned a total of 67 caps, the 11th highest in the national team's history. He has also scored 3 goals for his country.

His final international was an October 2009 FIFA World Cup qualification match away against Sweden.

=== International career statistics ===
National team	Year	Apps	Goals
Albania	1995	1	0
Albania	1996	2	0
Albania	1997	7	1
Albania	1998	4	1
Albania	1999	6	0
Albania	2000	5	0
Albania	2001	4	0
Albania	2002	4	0
Albania	2003	5	0
Albania	2004	4	0
Albania	2005	9	0
Albania	2006	5	0
Albania	2007	10	1
Albania	2008	0	0
Albania	2009	1	0
Total		67	3
