= 1949 Albanian National Championship =

Albanian National Championship
- Season: 1949
- Champions: Partizani

The 1949 Albanian National Championship was the twelfth season of the Albanian National Championship, the top professional league for association football clubs, since its establishment in 1930.

== Overview ==
It was contested by 9 teams, and Partizani won the championship.

== League standings ==
Pos	Team	Pld	W	D	L	GF	GA	GR	Pts	Qualification or relegation
1	Partizani (C)	16	14	2	0	61	7	8.714	30	Champions
2	Shkodra	16	12	2	2	55	11	5.000	26	
3	Ylli i Kuq Durrës	16	9	2	5	25	14	1.786	20	
4	Tirana	16	7	2	7	25	19	1.316	16	
5	Kavaja	16	7	2	7	32	27	1.185	16	
6	Korça	16	4	4	8	17	41	0.415	12	
7	Elbasani	16	4	1	11	17	41	0.415	9	
8	Fieri	16	3	3	10	17	54	0.315	9	
9	Shijaku (R)	16	1	4	11	13	48	0.271	6	Relegation to the 1950 Kategoria e Dytë

Source: RSSSF.org
(C) Champions; (R) Relegated
- Vlora were withdraw from the league after two rounds.

Note: 'Shkodra' is Vllaznia, 'Ylli i Kuq Durrësi' is KS Teuta Durrës, 'Tirana' is SK Tirana, 'Kavaja' is Besa, 'Korça' is Skënderbeu, 'Fieri' is Apolonia and 'Shijaku' is Erzeni

== Results ==
Home \ Away	ELB	FIE	KAV	KOR	PAR	SHI	SHK	TIR	YIK
Elbasani		4–3	1–4	2–0	0–3	2–0	1–3	3–2	0–1
Fieri	1–0		3–3	2–3	0–6	1–0	0–7	2–1	0–1
Kavaja	4–1	4–2		5–0	1–1	6–1	0–2	0–1	1–0
Korça	2–1	0–0	2–1		0–3	2–2	2–4	1–1	2–1
Partizani	6–0	9–0	6–0	6–1		6–1	3–1	3–1	4–1
Shijaku	1–1	2–2	1–2	0–0	0–2		1–3	3–1	0–4
Shkodra	5–0	9–0	3–0	6–0	1–2	7–1		2–0	2–1
Tirana	2–0	2–1	2–1	5–1	0–1	4–0	0–0		3–0
Ylli i Kuq Durrës	4–1	3–0	1–0	2–1	0–0	5–0	0–0	1–0	

Source: RSSSF.org
Legend: Blue = home team win; Yellow = draw; Red = away team win.
