= 1961 Albanian National Championship =

Albanian National Championship
- Season: 1961
- Champions: Partizani; 8th Albanian title
- Relegated: None
- European Cup: Partizani
- Cup Winners' Cup: None
- Matches: 90
- Goals: 240 (2.67 per match)
- Top goalscorer: Panajot Pano (14 goals)

The 1961 Albanian National Championship was the 24th season of the Albanian National Championship, the top professional league for association football clubs, since its establishment in 1930.

== Overview ==
It was contested by 10 teams, and Partizani won the championship.

== League standings ==
Pos	Team	Pld	W	D	L	GF	GA	GR	Pts	Qualification
1	Partizani (C)	18	14	2	2	46	13	3.538	30	Qualification for the European Cup first round (Note: Partizani and Dinamo Tirana finished the season level on points so the Albanian Football Association decided to organise a championship playoff game to determine the winner of the 1961 Albanian National Championship.)
2	Dinamo Tirana	18	14	2	2	41	12	3.417	30	
3	17 Nëntori	18	9	5	4	27	18	1.500	23	
4	Labinoti	18	8	2	8	23	26	0.885	18	
5	Flamurtari	18	5	6	7	21	26	0.808	16	
6	Skënderbeu	18	6	3	9	24	26	0.923	15	
7	Besa	18	6	3	9	17	24	0.708	15	
8	Traktori	18	3	6	9	16	26	0.615	12	
9	Vllaznia	18	4	3	11	10	26	0.385	11	
10	Tomori	18	3	4	11	15	43	0.349	10	

Source: RSSSF.org
(C) Champions

== Results ==
Home \ Away	17N	BES	DIN	FLA	LAB	PAR	SKË	TOM	TRA	VLL
17 Nëntori		1–0	0–1	2–1	3–1	2–2	3–1	3–0	2–0	1–2
Besa	0–1		0–1	1–1	2–0	0–2	1–0	2–1	3–0	2–0
Dinamo	2–0	3–0		4–2	6–0	2–1	7–2	3–1	2–0	3–0
Flamurtari	1–1	3–2	2–1		2–1	1–2	0–1	1–1	2–2	2–1
Labinoti	1–3	2–0	0–1	2–1		1–0	2–0	6–1	2–1	1–0
Partizani	2–2	4–1	3–1	2–1	2–0		2–0	6–0	4–0	3–0
Skënderbeu	1–2	0–0	1–1	3–0	3–1	1–2		6–0	1–0	2–0
Tomori	1–1	3–0	0–2	0–0	0–2	1–6	2–0		2–0	1–1
Traktori	0–0	1–1	0–0	0–1	1–1	0–1	2–2	3–1		4–1
Vllaznia	2–0	1–2	0–1	0–0	0–0	0–2	1–0	1–0	0–2	

Source: CalcioMondialeWeb.it
Legend: Blue = home team win; Yellow = draw; Red = away team win.

== Final ==
Team 1	Score	Team 2
Partizani	1–1 (a.e.t.)	Dinamo Tirana

=== Replay ===
Team 1	Score	Team 2
Partizani	1–0 (a.e.t.)	Dinamo Tirana

Note: '17 Nëntori' is SK Tirana, 'Labinoti' is KS Elbasani, 'Traktori' is KS Lushnja
