= 1963–64 Albanian National Championship =

Announcement of the soccer tournament

Albanian National Championship
- Season: 1963–64
- Champions: Partizani; 10th Albanian title
- Relegated: Luftëtari
- European Cup: Partizani
- Cup Winners' Cup: None
- Matches: 132
- Goals: 346 (2.62 per match)
- Top goalscorer: Robert Jashari (9 goals)

The 1963–64 Albanian National Championship was the 26th season of the Albanian National Championship, the top professional league for association football clubs, since its establishment in 1930.

== Overview ==
It was contested by 12 teams, and Partizani won the championship.

== League table ==
Pos	Team	Pld	W	D	L	GF	GA	GR	Pts	Qualification or relegation
1	Partizani (C)	22	15	7	0	46	10	4.600	37	Qualification for the European Cup first round
2	Dinamo Tirana	22	14	4	4	44	26	1.692	32	
3	Besa	22	11	7	4	31	19	1.632	29	
4	Labinoti	22	11	5	6	37	29	1.276	27	
5	Flamurtari	22	9	8	5	22	18	1.222	26	
6	17 Nëntori	22	8	9	5	32	21	1.524	25	
7	Lokomotiva Durrës	22	8	6	8	28	20	1.400	22	
8	Tomori	22	5	6	11	23	37	0.622	16	
9	Skënderbeu	22	5	5	12	20	33	0.606	15	
10	Traktori	22	7	0	15	21	40	0.525	14	
11	Vllaznia (O)	22	4	6	12	29	49	0.592	14	Qualification for the relegation play-offs
12	Luftëtari (R)	22	2	3	17	13	44	0.295	7	Relegation to the 1964–65 Kategoria e Dytë

Source: RSSSF.org
(C) Champions; (O) Play-off winners; (R) Relegated

Note: 'Labinoti' is Elbasani, '17 Nëntori' is Tirana, 'Lokomotiva Durrës' is Teuta, 'Traktori' is Lushnja

== Results ==
Home \ Away	17N	BES	DIN	FLA	LAB	LOK	LUF	PAR	SKË	TOM	TRA	VLL
17 Nëntori		1–1	0–1	1–1	2–0	1–0	2–0	0–0	3–0	3–0	3–0	3–1
Besa	2–1		1–1	1–0	5–2	0–1	2–0	1–1	1–0	2–1	1–0	3–0
Dinamo	2–1	2–1		2–3	4–3	3–2	3–0	0–0	3–2	4–1	3–1	2–1
Flamurtari	1–1	0–0	2–1		1–1	2–0	1–0	0–1	1–0	2–1	1–0	2–1
Labinoti	3–3	1–1	4–3	2–1		1–0	2–0	0–1	2–0	1–0	4–0	2–1
Lokomotiva	2–0	2–1	0–1	0–0	0–1		1–0	1–1	2–0	0–0	6–0	3–1
Luftëtari	2–1	0–1	0–3	1–1	1–2	1–1		0–3	1–2	0–2	2–1	2–2
Partizani	2–2	2–1	2–1	2–0	1–0	2–1	3–0		4–0	4–1	2–0	8–1
Skënderbeu	0–0	0–1	0–0	1–1	0–2	1–1	4–0	0–4		5–1	1–0	2–0
Tomori	1–1	1–1	0–1	1–1	1–1	3–3	3–2	0–2	1–0		2–0	0–1
Traktori	1–0	4–2	1–3	1–0	1–0	1–0	2–0	0–1	3–0	0–2		3–1
Vllaznia	2–2	0–2	1–1	0–1	3–3	0–2	2–1	1–1	2–2	3–1	5–3	

Source: CalcioMondialeWeb.it
Legend: Blue = home team win; Yellow = draw; Red = away team win.

== Relegation/promotion playoff ==
Team 1	Agg.	Team 2	1st leg	2nd leg
Vllaznia	3–1	Naftëtari	1–1	2–0
