= 1962–63 Albanian National Championship =

Albanian National Championship
- Season: 1962–63
- Champions: Partizani; 9th Albanian title
- Relegated: Korabi
- European Cup: Partizani
- Cup Winners' Cup: None
- Matches: 132
- Goals: 362 (2.74 per match)
- Top goalscorer: Robert Jashari (18 goals)

The 1962–63 Albanian National Championship was the 25th season of the Albanian National Championship, the top professional league for association football clubs, since its establishment in 1930.

== Overview ==
It was contested by 12 teams, and Partizani won the championship with 36 points.

== League table ==
Pos	Team	Pld	W	D	L	GF	GA	GR	Pts	Qualification or relegation
1	Partizani (C)	22	15	6	1	53	15	3.533	36	Qualification for the European Cup first round
2	Dinamo Tirana	22	11	10	1	43	25	1.720	32	
3	Besa	22	13	5	4	41	23	1.783	31	
4	17 Nëntori	22	7	10	5	33	28	1.179	24	
5	Labinoti	22	8	6	8	37	32	1.156	22	
6	Lokomotiva Durrës	22	7	7	8	29	36	0.806	21	
7	Flamurtari	22	7	6	9	26	27	0.963	20	
8	Skënderbeu	22	6	7	9	21	25	0.840	19	
9	Vllaznia	22	5	8	9	27	29	0.931	18	
10	Tomori	22	5	8	9	27	32	0.844	18	
11	Traktori	22	4	7	11	17	42	0.405	15	
12	Korabi (R)	22	1	6	15	8	48	0.167	8	Relegation to the 1963–64 Kategoria e Dytë

Source: RSSSF.org
(C) Champions; (R) Relegated

Note: '17 Nëntori' is Tirana, 'Labinoti' is Elbasani, 'Lokomotiva Durrës' is Teuta, 'Traktori' is KS Lushnja

== Results ==
Home \ Away	17N	BES	DIN	FLA	KOR	LAB	LOK	PAR	SKË	TOM	TRA	VLL
17 Nëntori		2–2	1–1	2–1	5–0	2–2	2–1	0–4	1–1	1–0	7–1	2–0
Besa	1–0		3–0	4–1	4–0	3–1	2–0	0–2	2–1	3–0	3–0	2–0
Dinamo	3–1	4–1		1–0	3–1	3–1	2–2	3–3	3–1	3–0	1–0	2–1
Flamurtari	0–0	2–0	2–2		0–0	2–0	0–0	0–1	3–1	3–0	3–0	2–0
Korabi	1–1	0–1	0–3	0–0		0–1	0–1	0–1	1–0	0–0	1–1	2–2
Labinoti	2–2	3–3	2–2	1–0	3–0		4–0	2–3	4–1	3–1	3–0	0–1
Lokomotiva	1–0	1–1	2–2	4–2	3–0	0–1		0–2	3–1	0–0	3–2	2–0
Partizani	4–0	2–0	1–1	3–0	3–0	4–1	5–1		1–1	2–1	5–0	2–2
Skënderbeu	0–0	0–1	0–0	3–0	2–0	1–1	3–0	1–0		1–1	0–1	1–0
Tomori	1–1	2–1	2–2	3–2	7–1	1–0	4–2	1–1	0–0		0–0	3–1
Traktori	2–3	1–1	1–1	1–2	2–1	1–1	1–1	0–3	2–0	1–0		0–0
Vllaznia	0–0	2–2	0–1	1–1	5–0	2–1	2–2	1–1	1–2	3–1	3–0	

Source: CalcioMondialeWeb.it
Legend: Blue = home team win; Yellow = draw; Red = away team win.
