= 1954 Albanian National Championship =

Albanian National Championship
- Season: 1954
- Champions: Partizani

The 1954 Albanian National Championship was the seventeenth season of the Albanian National Championship, the top professional league for association football clubs, since its establishment in 1930.

== Overview ==
It was contested by 12 teams, and Partizani won the championship.

== League standings ==
Pos	Team	Pld	W	D	L	GF	GA	GR	Pts
1	Partizani (C)	22	21	1	0	93	8	11.625	43
2	Dinamo Tirana	22	16	4	2	56	13	4.308	36
3	Puna Tiranë	22	14	3	5	47	21	2.238	31
4	Puna Shkodër	22	9	5	8	22	28	0.786	23
5	Luftëtari Sh.B.O. "Enver Hoxha"	22	9	4	9	28	27	1.037	22
6	Puna Kavajë	22	9	2	11	28	37	0.757	20
7	Puna Vlorë	22	8	4	10	23	32	0.719	20
8	Dinamo Durrësi	22	7	6	9	21	37	0.568	20
9	Puna Durrës	22	5	4	13	15	46	0.326	14
10	Puna Korçë	22	4	5	13	16	35	0.457	13
11	Spartaku Tiranë	22	4	5	13	26	52	0.500	13
12	Puna Elbasan	22	3	3	16	22	61	0.361	9

Source: RSSSF.org
(C) Champions

== Results ==
Home \ Away	DID	DIT	LUF	PAR	DUR	ELB	KAV	KOR	SHK	TIR	VLO	SPA
Dinamo Durrësi		1–3	1–0	0–3	1–0	4–3	1–1	1–0	0–0	1–1	3–0	1–0
Dinamo Tirana	7–0		2–1	1–1	5–0	6–0	2–0	1–0	4–2	2–0	2–0	5–0
Luftëtari "Enver Hoxha"	1–2	1–1		2–3	3–0	5–0	2–1	1–0	1–0	0–0	2–1	1–0
Partizani	4–1	1–0	6–0		8–1	5–0	7–0	5–0	5–0	2–1	7–0	6–1
Puna Durrës	0–0	0–1	0–1	0–7		1–0	1–0	1–0	3–0	1–0	1–1	0–2
Puna Elbasan	2–2	0–2	0–2	0–5	3–2		1–0	1–1	0–2	3–4	0–2	4–1
Puna Kavajë	1–0	1–2	1–0	0–3	5–2	2–1		2–0	0–0	3–5	1–0	3–0
Puna Korçë	1–0	1–1	0–0	0–5	1–0	3–3	1–2		1–1	0–1	3–0	2–1
Puna Shkodër	2–0	0–2	2–1	0–1	0–0	4–0	1–0	2–1		1–0	2–1	1–0
Puna Tiranë	4–0	3–1	3–1	0–1	4–0	2–1	3–0	3–0	4–1		2–0	4–1
Puna Vlorë	3–1	1–1	1–0	0–2	1–1	3–0	2–1	1–0	3–0	1–2		2–1
Spartaku	1–1	0–5	3–3	1–6	3–1	3–0	3–4	3–1	1–1	1–1	0–0	

Source: CalcioMondialeWeb.it
Legend: Blue = home team win; Yellow = draw; Red = away team win.
