= 1959 Albanian National Championship =

Albanian National Championship
- Season: 1959
- Champions: Partizani

The 1959 Albanian National Championship was the 22nd season of the Albanian National Championship, the top professional league for association football clubs, since its establishment in 1930.

== Overview ==
It was contested by 8 teams, and Partizani won the championship.

== League standings ==
Pos	Team	Pld	W	D	L	GF	GA	GR	Pts
1	Partizani (C)	14	9	5	0	27	6	4.500	23
2	17 Nëntori	14	8	3	3	20	11	1.818	19
3	Flamurtari	14	5	4	5	17	15	1.133	14
4	Dinamo Tirana	14	4	6	4	16	14	1.143	14
5	Besa	14	6	1	7	20	23	0.870	13
6	Labinoti	14	4	3	7	12	17	0.706	11
7	Vllaznia	14	3	4	7	13	24	0.542	10
8	Skënderbeu	14	3	2	9	13	28	0.464	8

Source: RSSSF.org
(C) Champions

Note: '17 Nëntori' is SK Tirana and 'Labinoti' is KS Elbasani

== Results ==
Home \ Away	17N	BES	DIN	FLA	LAB	PAR	SKË	VLL
17 Nëntori		4–2	2–0	2–0	0–1	2–2	2–0	1–0
Besa	1–2		2–1	3–1	2–0	1–1	2–0	3–2
Dinamo	1–1	3–1		0–0	1–0	0–1	3–1	0–0
Flamurtari	0–1	2–0	1–1		3–1	0–1	4–1	2–0
Labinoti	2–1	1–2	0–0	0–1		0–0	1–1	4–2
Partizani	0–0	3–0	1–0	3–1	2–0		6–1	3–0
Skënderbeu	1–2	2–1	1–3	0–0	2–0	0–3		3–0
Vllaznia	1–0	1–0	3–3	2–2	0–2	1–1	1–0	

Source: CalcioMondialeWeb.it
Legend: Blue = home team win; Yellow = draw; Red = away team win.
