= Foto Strakosha =

Albanian footballer and manager (born 1965)

Personal information
- Full name: Fotaq Strakosha
- Date of birth: 29 March 1965 (age 61)
- Place of birth: Memaliaj, PR Albania
- Height: 1.93 m (6 ft 4 in)
- Position: Goalkeeper

Team information
- Current team: Lazio Youth (goalkeeping coach)

Youth career
- 1982–1985: Minatori Tepelenë

Senior career*
Years	Team	Apps	(Gls)
1985–1988	Minatori Tepelenë	1 (Note: At least one appearance for Minatori Tepelenë is known.)	(0)
1988–1990	Dinamo Tirana	38	(0)
1991	PAS Giannina	3	(0)
1991–1993	Ethnikos Piraeus	33	(0)
1993–1997	Olympiacos	39	(0)
1997–1999	Panionios	56	(0)
1999–2002	Ionikos	75	(0)
2002–2003	Kallithea	14	(0)
2003	Kalamata	18	(0)
2003–2004	Ethnikos Asteras	13	(0)
2004	Proodeftiki	13	(0)
2004–2005	Panionios	5	(0)
Total		307	(0)

International career
1989	Albania U21	1	(0)
1990–2005	Albania	73	(0)

Managerial career
- 2005–2006: Akraatitos (goalkeeping coach)
- 2006–2007: Olympiacos Academy (goalkeeping coach)
- 2007–2010: APOEL (goalkeeping coach)
- 2010–2011: Panionios (goalkeeping coach)
- 2011–2014: Albania U19
- 2014–2017: Olympiacos (goalkeeping coach)
- 2017–: Lazio Youth (goalkeeping coach)
- * Club domestic league appearances and goals

Fotaq "Foto" Strakosha (Albanian pronunciation: [fɔˈtac stɾaˈkɔʃa]; born 29 March 1965) is an Albanian former professional footballer who played as a goalkeeper and is currently a goalkeeping coach with Lazio Youth.

Strakosha is regarded as one of Albania's most popular goalkeepers. During his 20-year playing career, he represented 11 different clubs, starting in Albania before moving to Greece in 1991, where he spent the majority of his career until his retirement in 2005.

Strakosha began his senior career with Minatori Tepelenë in 1985 before moving Dinamo Tirana. In his first season with Dinamo, he won the Albanian Cup and the Albanian Supercup. The following season proved even more successful, as he won all three domestic competitions: the Albanian Superliga, the Albanian Cup, and the Albanian Supercup. After spending another half-season at Dinamo, Strakosha moved to Greece, joining PAS Giannina for the remainder of the 1990–91 season. He later played in Piraeus for Ethnikos Piraeus for two years before joining Olympiacos, where he spent four seasons. During his time at Olympiacos, the club consistently finished among the top teams in the Greek top-flight, winning the league title in the 1996–97 season. He then signed for Panionios, where he played for two seasons, becoming the club's first-choice goalkeeper and winning the Greek Cup in his first season. Strakosha later joined Ionikos, spending three and a half seasons there, before moving to Kallithea for the first half of the 2002–03 season. He continued in the Greek second division with Kalamata and later Ethnikos Asteras. He returned to the top flight with Proodeftiki for the remainder of the 2003–04 season, before rejoining Panionios for the 2004–05 season, which marked the end of his playing career.

At international level, Strakosha captained the Albania national team for several years. He earned 73 caps between 1990 and 2005, becoming Albania's most capped player at the time of his retirement.

== Early life ==
Fotaq Strakosha was born on 29 March 1965 in Memaliaj, to Lefter Strakosha and his wife Theano Jerasimo Duni. He spent his childhood and completed his early education in his hometown Memaliaj, near Tepelenë, an area known for its coal mines, where he also worked for a short period. In his hometown, he began playing football at a young age, initially through school and local sporting activities. From the age of nine, he showed an early interest in the sport, playing regularly with his peers in local fields and developing the foundations of his goalkeeping skills, which he also mentioned being influenced by goalkeepers he admired, including Harald Schumacher, Rinat Dasayev, and Jean-Marie Pfaff. Strakosha later joined the youth teams of local club Minatori in 1982, progressing through the club's youth system before being promoted to the senior team, which competed in the Kategoria e Parë.

== Club career ==
=== Early career ===
Strakosha played for Minatori Tepelenë between 1985 and 1988. He made his debut senior debut in a league match against Apolonia, coming into the team after the first‑choice goalkeeper was injured; Minatori lost 3–0, but Strakosha was noted for his performance in goal. During this period, he established himself as the team's first-choice goalkeeper and was identified as a promising young goalkeeper earning a regular place in the first team by early age. He attracted attention from several clubs competing in the Albanian top division, including Flamurtari, Luftëtari and Apolonia. Despite this interest, potential transfers were delayed due to political and biographical restrictions in place during the communist period in Albania.

In 1986, discussions regarding a move to Dinamo Tirana were initiated following contacts between Minatori head coach Skënder Ibrahimi and Dinamo coach Bejkush Birçe. The transfer was eventually completed after assurances were given by state authorities that Strakosha would not face restrictions related to his background, allowing him to continue his career at a higher competitive level. His move to Dinamo marked a significant step, transitioning from a non-elite club in the lower divisions to one of Albania's most successful teams of the era.

=== Dinamo Tirana ===
Strakosha joined Dinamo Tirana in 1988, where he competed for the goalkeeper position alongside Ilir Bozhiqi. He established himself as a regular member of the squad during his first season, adapting quickly to the demands of playing for one of Albania's most successful clubs. Through consistent performances, he became the club's first-choice goalkeeper during the following campaigns. Strakosha made 38 league appearances for Dinamo in the Albanian National Championship. During his time at the club, Dinamo won the Albanian Cup in the 1988–89 and 1989–90 seasons, the Albanian Supercup in 1989, and secured the Albanian National Championship title in the 1989–90 season. His performances during this period contributed to Dinamo's domestic success before his departure from the club in 1991.

Strakosha also made his debut in European competition during the 1989–90 European Cup Winners' Cup Preliminary round, featuring in the second leg against Chernomorets. He kept a clean sheet in a 4–0 home victory, which allowed Dinamo to overturn a 3–1 first-leg defeat and advance to the regular rounds of the competition. In the first round of the competition, Strakosha featured against Dinamo București in September 1989. He kept a clean sheet in the first leg, a 1–0 home victory for Dinamo Tirana, but conceded two goals in the return leg, a 2–0 away defeat, which resulted in Dinamo's elimination from the tournament on aggregate.

In the 1990–91 European Cup First round, Strakosha played both legs against Marseille. Dinamo Tirana lost the first leg 5–1 away, and although Strakosha kept a clean sheet in the second leg at home in a goalless draw, the team was eliminated.

=== PAS Giannina ===
Following the collapse of the communist regime in Albania and the opening of the country's borders, in December 1990, Strakosha arrived in Greece and applied for political asylum; he underwent a trial with PAS Giannina and subsequently signed a contract, marking the beginning of his professional career in Greek football.

He made his debut for the club during the latter part of the 1990–91 season, marking his first experience outside Albania. In one of his early appearances, Strakosha featured in a match against Panathinaikos, during which he saved a penalty, despite PAS Giannina's defeat. During his brief spell at the club, he made three league appearances in total.

His performances at PAS Giannina contributed to his continued progression in Greek football, leading to further opportunities within the country's top divisions later in his career.

After a six-month spell at PAS Giannina, during which he made three official appearances, Strakosha left the club due to administrative and documentation issues.

=== Ethnikos Piraeus ===
He subsequently joined Greek side Ethnikos Piraeus in 1991, but however his registration with the club was delayed for several months due to administrative and contractual issues related to his previous agreement with PAS Giannina. That transfer however marked the beginning of a longer and more stable period in his career in Greece. Between 1991 and 1993, Strakosha established himself as the club's first-choice goalkeeper, making 33 league appearances for Ethnikos. His regular involvement at the club contributed to his growing experience in Greek football and helped consolidate his position as a reliable goalkeeper at senior level.

Following his first season at the club, he held discussions regarding a potential transfer to AEK Athens, including meetings with the club's officials. The move did not materialise after Ethnikos requested a transfer fee that was not accepted.

Following the unsuccessful transfer negotiations, Strakosha remained with Ethnikos Piraeus and competed with the club in the Greek second division (Beta Ethniki) during the following season. He later transferred to Olympiacos.

=== Olympiacos ===
Strakosha had attracted the interest of Olympiacos early in 1993, and he joined the club, signing a long-term contract and becoming part of the squad alongside experienced goalkeeper Alekos Rantos. His move represented a step up to one of the most competitive teams in Greek football at the time. During his spell at Olympiacos, Strakosha worked under several head coaches, including Ljupko Petrović, Nikos Alefantos, Stavros Diamantopoulos, Thijs Libregts and Dušan Bajević , and competed regularly for the goalkeeper position, contributing to the team's consistent presence near the top of the Greek top division.

Strakosha made his debut early in the start of the 1993–94 Alpha Ethniki season on 29 August 1993 in a 1–1 draw away to Aris Thessaloniki, appearing . In his first league stages, Strakosha established himself as a regular starter, keeping four clean sheets in his first nine league appearances and conceding only five goals. Olympiacos finished in third place in the final league standings.

Strakosha also featured in European competition during the season, making three appearances in the 1993–94 UEFA Cup. The club recorded two wins against Botev Plovdiv and one loss against Tenerife across two rounds of the tournament.

In the 1994–95 Alpha Ethniki, Strakosha began the campaign with a clean sheet in a 1–0 victory against Doxa Drama and made three early league appearances. He did not feature again until February 1995, after which he played in all remaining league matches, bringing his total to 17 appearances for the season and recorded five clean sheets and conceded 17 goals, while Olympiacos suffered only one defeat in games in which he appeared. Olympiacos finished in second place in the Greek top division, behind Panathinaikos in the final league standings.

In the 1995–96 Alpha Ethniki season, Strakosha played 12 matches, Olympiacos finished in third place in the final league standings. Strakosha featured also in the 1995–96 Greek Cup.

At the start of the 1996–97 season, Strakosha featured in the opening two 1996–97 Alpha Ethniki matches under a new head coach Dušan Bajević. keeping clean sheets in both fixtures as Olympiacos recorded two victories. He also appeared in both legs of the first round of the 1996–97 UEFA Cup against Ferencváros, with Olympiacos being eliminated 5–3 on aggregate.

Despite his involvement at the beginning of the season, these proved to be his only appearances during the 1996–97 campaign. For a variety of reasons, he was unable to establish himself further in the team. Olympiacos went on to win the league title for the first time after a decade. Upon the completion of the fourth year of his contract, Strakosha requested to leave the club, despite the management's desire for him to stay. He had originally signed a five-year contract with the club, but however a mutual agreement was reached, allowing him to depart under the condition that he would not join a direct rival, and he subsequently joined Panionios.

=== Panionios ===
Strakosha joined Panionios in the summer of 1997 on a two-year contract, arriving with the aim of re-establishing himself as a regular first-team goalkeeper.

Strakosha made his debut for Panionios on 31 August 1997 in a 3–0 home defeat against Panathinaikos in the Greek top division.

Following his debut, he went on to establish himself as the team's first-choice goalkeeper, recording two clean sheets in the matches that followed. Throughout the season, the club faced administrative and financial difficulties; however, the squad maintained cohesion on the pitch, where Strakosha played a key role for the club, contributing to a successful period that included the winning of domestic silverware with Panionios.

During the 1997–98 Alpha Ethniki season, Strakosha made 32 league appearances for Panionios, keeping eight clean sheets in total. Panionios however ended 11th in ranking table.

During the 1997–98 Greek Cup, Strakosha made five appearances for Panionios, featuring in both quarter-final and semi-final legs, as well as the final, as the club went on to win the competition, defeating Panathinaikos 1–0 in the final played on 29 April 1998 at the Karaiskakis Stadium, with Strakosha starting and being decisive throughout the match.

In the following season, Strakosha made 24 appearances, keeping five clean sheets in the 1998–99 Alpha Ethniki, as the club finished 15th in the league. He also made one appearance in the 1998–99 Greek Cup.

During the 1998–99 UEFA Cup Winners' Cup, Strakosha featured in all of Panionios' matches as the club reached the quarter-finals of the competition, before being eliminated by eventual champions Lazio in the quarter-finals, finishing among the last eight teams in the tournament.

Strakosha described his spell at Panionios as one of the most significant periods of his career, citing the strong sense of trust and respect he experienced at the club. During his time in Nea Smyrni, he developed a close personal connection with the area, choosing to settle there permanently, a bond he has continued to highlight long after his playing career.

=== Ionikos ===
In the summer of 1999, Strakosha moved to Ionikos.

He made his competitive debut for the club in mid-September 1999 in the 1999–2000 UEFA Cup, featuring in both legs against Nantes, as Ionikos were eliminated 4–1 on aggregate.

Later the same month, Strakosha made his league debut in the 1999–2000 Alpha Ethniki in a 1–1 away draw against Panachaiki.

He subsequently established himself as Ionikos’ first-choice goalkeeper during the season, providing stability at the back as the club enjoyed a solid campaign in the Greek top division. In total, Strakosha made 32 league appearances, while Ionikos finished 10th in the standings.

Ionikos also reached the final of the 1999–2000 Greek Cup, with Strakosha starting in goal in the final, where the team were defeated 3–0 by AEK Athens.

In the following 2000–01 Alpha Ethniki season, Strakosha made 25 league appearances, keeping five clean sheets during the campaign. Ionikos finished the season in sixth place in the league standings, achieving one of the club's strongest league performances at the time.

During the 2001–02 Alpha Ethniki season, Strakosha made 18 league appearances for Ionikos, recording three clean sheets.

=== Kallithea ===
Strakosha had considered retiring from professional football, but however, he decided to continue his playing career following encouragement from Hans-Peter Briegel, head coach of the Albania national team at the time.

In the 2002–03 season, Strakosha joined Kallithea. During the 2002–03 Alpha Ethniki campaign, he made 13 league appearances for the club. Kallithea finished the season in 13th place, narrowly avoiding relegation from the Greek top division.

=== Later career ===
==== 2003–04 season ====
In the summer of 2003, Strakosha joined second-division side Ethnikos Asteras, where he spent six months and made 13 league appearances.

Strakosha mutually terminated his contract with Ethnikos Asteras in January 2004 and moved to Proodeftiki in the Greek top division at the age of 38. He spent six months at the club during the second half of the 2003–04 season, making 12 league appearances in the 2003–04 Alpha Ethniki and keeping two clean sheets.

Proodeftiki nevertheless finished last in the league table and were relegated at the end of the season.

==== Return to Panionios ====
In the summer of 2004, Strakosha returned to Panionios for his final season. During the 2004–05 season, he made five league appearances in the 2004–05 Alpha Ethniki, only during the last part of the season (April–May 2005).

Strakosha had initially considered retiring earlier, but continued until the end of the season due to a combination of factors, including an agreement with the club president and the need for additional goalkeeping cover following the absence of first-choice goalkeeper Jaroslav Drobný.

Strakosha set a record in the Greek top division by becoming the goalkeeper with the most penalties saved in the history of the competition; on 3 April 2005, in a league match against Kerkyra, he saved a penalty to reach a total of 14 penalties in the Alpha Ethniki, surpassing the previous record held by Georgios Dafkos since 1995.

He concluded his professional playing career at Panionios, a club he had strong ties with.

== International career ==
Strakosha first appeared at international level with the Albania under-21 team, featuring in a 1990 UEFA European Under-21 Championship qualifying match against Poland on 14 November 1989, which ended in a 1–0 defeat.

Strakosha then represented the Albania senior team from 1990 to 2005.

He made his senior debut under coach Bejkush Birçe on 30 May 1990 in a UEFA Euro 1992 qualifying match against Iceland, where Albania lost the match 2–0 in Reykjavík; he was 25 years old at the time.

Following his move abroad to Greece in early 1991, Strakosha earned additional caps from 1991 onwards, appearing regularly in the starting line-up. During this period, he recorded two clean sheets in international matches against Greece.

During the 1994 FIFA World Cup qualification – UEFA Group 3, Strakosha played in five of Albania's twelve matches and the national team earned only one point in the matches in which he featured.

In mid-1993, following his transfer to Olympiacos, Strakosha established himself as Albania's first-choice goalkeeper. He was an almost ever-present member of the national team during the UEFA Euro 1996 qualifying Group 7, playing nearly every minute of the qualification process and missing a total of only eight minutes throughout the entire campaign.

Strakosha delivered notable performances in both matches against Moldova; on 29 March 1995, he kept a clean sheet in a 3–0 victory and was substituted in the final eight minutes, marking the only time he was replaced during the qualifying campaign. In the return fixture on 7 June 1995, he captained Albania for the first time and played the full match in a 3–2 away victory.

In addition Albania earned two further points during the campaign, recording 1–1 draws against Bulgaria and Wales and finished the group stage level on points with Wales but placed last on head-to-head records.

During the 1998 FIFA World Cup qualification – UEFA Group 9, Strakosha played seven full matches for Albania and kept one clean sheet, in a 1–0 victory over Northern Ireland, which was Albania's only win in the qualifying group.

During the UEFA Euro 2000 qualifying campaign in Group 2, Strakosha played every minute in nine of Albania's ten matches and recorded two clean sheets, including a goalless draw against Greece early in the qualification process. Following the match, he briefly announced his intention to retire from international football amid criticism directed at him, but the decision was temporary and he continued his international career thereafter. Albania recorded four draws overall and concluded the campaign with a 2–1 home victory over Georgia, finishing second from bottom in the group standings; this marked the first time Albania avoided last place in a European Championship qualifying campaign.

During the 2002 FIFA World Cup qualification – UEFA Group 9, Strakosha played seven full matches for Albania and kept a clean sheet in a 2–0 victory over Greece, which was Albania's only win in the qualifying group. On 6 June 2001, he made his 50th international appearance in the penultimate match of the qualification group against Germany ended in a 0–2 loss.

In Albania's final match of the group on 5 September 2001 against England, Strakosha was appointed team captain by newly appointed head coach Sulejman Demollari.

Strakosha was confirmed team captain during the UEFA Euro 2004 qualifying campaign, initially under head coach Giuseppe Dossena and later under Hans-Peter Briegel. During his tenure under Briegel, Strakosha later stated that the German coach had encouraged him to continue his playing career at a time when he was considering retirement.

During the UEFA Euro 2004 qualifying Group 10, Strakosha was an almost ever-present member of national team, featuring in all eight matches and missing only 12 minutes of playing time. During these qualifying campaigns, Strakosha surpassed Rudi Vata to become the Albanian national team player with the most international appearances at the time. Albania recorded an improved campaign compared to previous editions, remaining unbeaten at home and securing two wins and two draws to collect eight points. As in the previous European Championship qualifying campaign, Albania concluded the group stage by defeating Georgia and finished second from bottom in the standings.

The 2006 FIFA World Cup qualification – UEFA Group 2 campaign marked Strakosha's final international season. It began on 4 September 2004 with a historic 1–0 home victory over Greece, the reigning European champions at the time; that same night, a tragic incident occurred in Greece when an Albanian immigrant supporter celebrating the win was attacked and killed by local hooligans.

Strakosha also kept a clean sheet in a 1–0 away win against Kazakhstan and played a total of five matches during the campaign, as his final international appearance came on 9 February 2005 in a 2–0 loss to Ukraine. He also became the oldest player to represent Albania, at the age of 39 years, 10 months, and 17 days.

By the end of his international career, Strakosha had earned a total of 73 caps for Albania, maintaining his position as the player with the most appearances for the national team at the time.

Strakosha also holds the unique records for the most appearances by an Albanian player in UEFA European Championship qualifying matches, a record he shares with Altin Lala, with 29 appearances each, and for the most consecutive years of appearances, playing in every year from 1990 to 2005, a total of 16 consecutive years.

== Personal life ==
Strakosha was born in Memaliaj, Southern Albania. His elder brother, Vaso, was described as a talented midfielder whose career was cut short by a serious knee injury, and later became a person with a legal and administrative capacity. Strakosha married Adelina at the age of 26 and the couple have two sons. His youngest son Thomas is a professional footballer and plays as a goalkeeper for AEK Athens and the Albania national football team. His eldest son Dhimitri played as a striker in the lower leagues of Albania and Greece.

== Managerial career ==
After retiring, Strakosha initially oversaw some goalkeeping coaching duties at Panionios, but due to other commitments, his wife assisted in managing responsibilities.

He then worked briefly as a goalkeeping coach with Akraatitos, during the club's spell in the Greek top division.

He subsequently joined the academies of Olympiacos, where he spent two years working as a goalkeeping coach and also served as a youth team coach at under-15 level.

In 2007, he moved to Cyprus to work with APOEL as a goalkeeping coach for three years.

In 2010, he returned to Panionios as a full-time goalkeeping coach and worked for approximately one-and-a-half year.

In 2011, he moved into international youth football, becoming the head coach of Albania national under-19 team, serving three years.

He left Albania U19 on 12 August 2014 to work for Olympiacos for a second spell as goalkeeping coach.

He left Olympiacos and moved at Lazio Youth to work again as goalkeeping coach, rejoining his son Thomas who was part of Lazio's senior team.

== Career statistics ==
=== Club ===
Appearances and goals by club, season and competition
Club	Season	League			Cup (Note: Includes Albanian Cup and Greek Cup.)		Europe (Note: Includes UEFA Champions League, UEFA Cup Winners' Cup and UEFA Cup.)		Supercup (Note: Includes Albanian Supercup.)		Total	
Club	Season	Division	Apps	Goals	Apps	Goals	Apps	Goals	Apps	Goals	Apps	Goals
Minatori Tepelenë	1985–86	Kategoria e Dytë					—		—			
Minatori Tepelenë	1986–87	Kategoria e Dytë					—		—			
Minatori Tepelenë	1987–88	Kategoria e Dytë					—		—			
Minatori Tepelenë	Total		1*				—		—		1*	0
Dinamo Tirana	1988–89	Albanian National Championship					—		—			
Dinamo Tirana	1989–90	Albanian National Championship	31	0			3 (Note: Three appearances in the 1989–90 European Cup Winners' Cup early rounds)	0	1 (Note: One appearance in the 1989 Albanian Supercup)	0	32	0
Dinamo Tirana	1990–91	Albanian National Championship	7	0			2 (Note: Two appearances in the 1989–90 European Cup Winners' Cup Preliminary round)	0	—		9	0
Dinamo Tirana	Total		38	0			5	0	1	0	44	0
PAS Giannina	1990–91	Alpha Ethniki	3	0	—		—		—		3	0
Ethnikos Piraeus	1991–92	Alpha Ethniki	17	0	—		—		—		17	0
Ethnikos Piraeus	1992–93	Beta Ethniki	16	0	—		—		—		16	0
Ethnikos Piraeus	Total		33	0	—		—		—		33	0
Olympiacos	1993–94	Alpha Ethniki	8	0	—		3 (Note: Three appearances in the 1993–94 UEFA Cup)	0	—		11	0
Olympiacos	1994–95	Alpha Ethniki	17	0	—		—		—		17	0
Olympiacos	1995–96	Alpha Ethniki	12	0	1 (Note: One appearance in the 1995–96 Greek Cup)	0	—		—		13	0
Olympiacos	1996–97	Alpha Ethniki	2	0	—		2	0	—		4	0
Olympiacos	Total		39	0	1	0	5	0	—		45	0
Panionios	1997–98	Alpha Ethniki	32	0	5 (Note: Five appearances in the 1997–98 Greek Cup)	0	—		—		37	0
Panionios	1998–99	Alpha Ethniki	24	0	1 (Note: One appearance in the 1995–96 Greek Cup)	0	6	0	—		31	0
Panionios	Total		56	0	6	0	6	0	—		68	0
Ionikos	1999–2000	Alpha Ethniki	32	0	1 (Note: One appearance in the 1999–2000 Greek Cup final)	0	2	0	—		35	0
Ionikos	2000–01	Alpha Ethniki	25	0	—		—		—		25	0
Ionikos	2001–02	Alpha Ethniki	18	0	—		—		—		18	0
Ionikos	Total		75	0	1	0	2	0	—		78	0
Kallithea	2002–03	Alpha Ethniki	14	0	—		—		—		14	0
Kalamata	2002–03	Beta Ethniki	18	0	—		—		—		18	0
Ethnikos Asteras	2003–04	Beta Ethniki	13	0	—		—		—		13	0
Proodeftiki	2003–04	Alpha Ethniki	13	0	—		—		—		13	0
Panionios	2004–05	Alpha Ethniki	5	0	—		—		—		5	0
Career total			308*	0	8	0	18	0	1	0	335*	0

=== International ===
Appearances and goals by national team and year
National team	Year	Apps	Goals
Albania	1990	1	0
Albania	1991	2	0
Albania	1992	4	0
Albania	1993	2	0
Albania	1994	4	0
Albania	1995	6	0
Albania	1996	2	0
Albania	1997	6	0
Albania	1998	6	0
Albania	1999	7	0
Albania	2000	5	0
Albania	2001	6	0
Albania	2002	2	0
Albania	2003	11	0
Albania	2004	8	0
Albania	2005	1	0
Total		73	0

== Honours ==
Dinamo Tirana

- Albanian Superliga: 1989–90
- Albanian Cup: 1988–89, 1989–90
- Albanian Supercup: 1989, 1990

Olympiacos

- Super League Greece: 1996–97

Panionios

- Greek Cup: 1997–98
