= 1990 Albanian Supercup =

- Event: Albanian Supercup
Dinamo Tirana	Flamurtari Vlorë
3	3
- Flamurtari Vlorë won 8–7 on penalties
- Date: 11 January 1991
- Venue: Qemal Stafa Stadium, Tirana
- Man of the Match: Sokol Kushta (Flamurtari Vlorë)
- Referee: Plarent Kotherja

The 1990 Albanian Supercup was the second edition of the Albanian Supercup, an annual Albanian football match. The match was contested by Dinamo Tirana, champions of the 1989–90 Albanian Superliga and 1989–90 Albanian Cup, and Flamurtari Vlorë, which was the runner-up in cup. It was held at the Qemal Stafa Stadium on 11 January 1991.

The regular and extra-time finished in a 3–3 draw, with Flamurtari's Sokol Kushta notably scoring a hat-trick. Dinamo then won on penalty shootouts.

== Match details ==
11 January 1991
14:00 CET

Dinamo Tirana	3–3 (a.e.t.)	Flamurtari Vlorë
Tahiri 39', 41'; Demollari 83'		Kushta 4' (pen.), 22', 75'
Penalties
Ibro (penalty scored); Gjergji (penalty scored); Abazi (penalty missed); Ferko (penalty scored); Tahiri (penalty scored); Xhafa (penalty missed)	7–8	(penalty scored) Kushta; (penalty missed) Memushi; (penalty scored) Ziu; (penalty scored) Gjondeda; (penalty scored) Arapi; (penalty scored) Lutaj

Qemal Stafa Stadium, Tirana
Referee: Plarent Kotherja

== See also ==
- 1989–90 Albanian Superliga
- 1989–90 Albanian Cup
