= Arjan Stafa =

Albanian footballer

Personal information
- Date of birth: 13 June 1964 (age 62)
- Place of birth: Tirana, Albania
- Height: 1.75 m (5 ft 9 in)
- Position: Leftback

Senior career*
Years	Team	Apps	(Gls)
1984–1991	Dinamo Tirana		
1993–1994	Teramo		

International career
1989–1990	Albania	3	(0)
- * Club domestic league appearances and goals

Arjan Stafa (born 13 June 1964) is an Albanian retired football defender who played for the Albania national team.

== Club career ==
Stafa played for Dinamo Tirana during the 1980s alongside fellow internationals Sulejman Demollari and Agim Canaj. Following the fall of communism, Stafa was among the first players to move abroad, ending up in Italy where he played for Teramo.

== International career ==
He made his debut for Albania in a January 1989 friendly match at home against Greece and earned a total of 3 caps, scoring no goals. His final international was the December 1990 European Championship qualification 9–0 defeat at Spain.

== Honours ==
- Kategoria Superiore (2): 1985–86, 1989–90
- Kupa e Shqipërisë (2): 1985–86, 1989–90
- Superkupa së Shqipërisë (1) : 1990
