= 1987–88 Balkans Cup =

Tournament details
- Country: Balkans
- Teams: 10

Final positions
- Champions: (Bulgaria) Slavia Sofia
- Runners-up: (Romania) Argeș Pitești

Tournament statistics
- Matches played: 30
- Goals scored: 110 (3.67 per match)

The 1987–88 Balkans Cup was an edition of the Balkans Cup, a football competition for representative clubs from the Balkan states. It was contested by 10 teams and Slavia Sofia won the trophy.

== Format ==
The ten teams are drawn into one group of four teams and two groups of three teams. The top two teams from the group of four, and the winners of the two three-team groups, qualify for the semi-finals. Semi-finals and final are two-legged ties.

== Group Stage ==
=== Group A ===
Pos	Team	Pld	W	D	L	GF	GA	GR	Pts	Qualification
1	(Romania) Argeș Pitești	6	4	1	1	10	5	2.000	9	Advances to semifinals
2	(Bulgaria) Slavia Sofia	6	3	0	3	9	7	1.286	6	Advances to semifinals
3	(Albania) Luftëtari Gjirokastër	6	2	1	3	6	12	0.500	5	
4	(Greece) PAOK	6	2	0	4	10	11	0.909	4	

Source: rsssf.com
Rules for classification: 1) points; 2) goal average; 3) number of goals scored
1 October 1987

PAOK (Greece)	2–0	(Romania) Argeș Pitești

Toumba Stadium, Thessaloniki

1 October 1987

Luftëtari Gjirokastër (Albania)	2–0	(Bulgaria) Slavia Sofia

Gjirokastra Stadium, Gjirokastra

22 October 1987

Slavia Sofia (Bulgaria)	4–0	(Greece) PAOK

Slavia Stadium, Sofia

22 October 1987

Argeș Pitești (Romania)	2–0	(Albania) Luftëtari Gjirokastër

1 Mai, Pitești

4 November 1987

Luftëtari Gjirokastër (Albania)	1–0	(Greece) PAOK

Gjirokastra Stadium, Gjirokastra

5 November 1987

Argeș Pitești (Romania)	2–0	(Bulgaria) Slavia Sofia

1 Mai, Pitești

18 February 1988

Slavia Sofia (Bulgaria)	4–1	(Albania) Luftëtari Gjirokastër

Slavia Stadium, Sofia

24 March 1988

Luftëtari Gjirokastër (Albania)	0–0	(Romania) Argeș Pitești

Gjirokastra Stadium, Gjirokastra

6 April 1988

PAOK (Greece)	6–2	(Albania) Luftëtari Gjirokastër

Toumba Stadium, Thessaloniki

20 April 1988

Argeș Pitești (Romania)	4–2	(Greece) PAOK

1 Mai, Pitești

31 May 1988

Slavia Sofia (Bulgaria)	1–2	(Romania) Argeș Pitești

Slavia Stadium, Sofia

PAOK (Greece)	0–1	(Bulgaria) Slavia Sofia

Toumba Stadium, Thessaloniki

=== Group B ===
Pos	Team	Pld	W	D	L	GF	GA	GR	Pts	Qualification
1	(Bulgaria) Sliven	4	3	0	1	16	5	3.200	6	Advances to semifinals
2	(Turkey) Samsunspor	4	2	0	2	12	14	0.857	4	
3	(Greece) Iraklis	4	1	0	3	7	16	0.438	2	

Source: rsssf.com
Rules for classification: 1) points; 2) goal average; 3) number of goals scored
1 October 1987

Samsunspor (Turkey)	3–2	(Bulgaria) Sliven
Dinler 30', 77'; Yücel 75'		Plamen 16'; Vurkov 27'

Samsun 19 Mayıs Stadium, Samsun

21 October 1987

Iraklis (Greece)	4–3	(Turkey) Samsunspor
Hatzilaris 33'; Anastasiadis 47'; Maloumidis 83', 86' (pen.)		Dinler 38', 57', 62'

Kaftanzoglio Stadium, Thessaloniki

12 November 1987

Sliven (Bulgaria)	4–0	(Greece) Iraklis

Hadzhi Dimitar Stadium, Sliven

16 December 1987

Sliven (Bulgaria)	7–0	(Turkey) Samsunspor

Hadzhi Dimitar Stadium, Sliven

1988

Iraklis (Greece)	2–3	(Bulgaria) Sliven

Kaftanzoglio Stadium, Thessaloniki

1988

Samsunspor (Turkey)	6–1	(Greece) Iraklis
Çolak 7', 31'; Koloğlu 20', 85'; Coşkundere 67'; Sinecek 78'		Tsinekilis 37'

Samsun 19 Mayıs Stadium, Samsun

=== Group C ===
Pos	Team	Pld	W	D	L	GF	GA	GR	Pts	Qualification
1	(Romania) Corvinul Hunedoara	4	2	2	0	10	5	2.000	6	Advances to semifinals
2	(Turkey) Eskişehirspor	4	1	1	2	9	10	0.900	3	
3	(Albania) Dinamo Tirana	4	1	1	2	4	8	0.500	3	

Source: rsssf.com
Rules for classification: 1) points; 2) goal average; 3) number of goals scored
1 October 1987

Dinamo Tirana (Albania)	3–1	(Turkey) Eskişehirspor
Abazi 8'; Canaj 29'; Demollari 83'		Tortaş 89' (pen.)

Dinamo Stadium, Tirana

22 October 1987

Corvinul Hunedoara (Romania)	2–0	(Albania) Dinamo Tirana

Corvinul, Hunedoara

5 November 1987

Eskişehirspor (Turkey)	2–2	(Romania) Corvinul Hunedoara
Beadini 4'; Medjodovic 20'		17'; 76'

Eskişehir Atatürk Stadium, Eskişehir

16 March 1988

Eskişehirspor (Turkey)	4–0	(Albania) Dinamo Tirana
Beadini 14'; Yazıcı 39'; Demirbilek 51'; Medjodovic 83'

Eskişehir Atatürk Stadium, Eskişehir

11 May 1988

Corvinul Hunedoara (Romania)	5–2	(Turkey) Eskişehirspor
Târnoveanu 10', 45'; Petcu 30', 82', 90'		Beadini 66', 73'

Corvinul, Hunedoara

9 June 1988

Dinamo Tirana (Albania)	1–1	(Romania) Corvinul Hunedoara

Dinamo Stadium, Tirana

== Semi-finals ==
Team 1	Agg.	Team 2	1st leg	2nd leg
Corvinul Hunedoara (Romania)	1–2	(Romania) Argeș Pitești	0–1	1–1
Sliven (Bulgaria)	2–4	(Bulgaria) Slavia Sofia	1–3	1–1

=== First leg ===
27 July 1988

Argeș Pitești (Romania)	1–1	(Romania) Corvinul Hunedoara
Grigoriu 89'		Hanganu 14'

Miercurea Ciuc

1988

Slavia Sofia (Bulgaria)	1–1	(Bulgaria) Sliven

Slavia Stadium, Sofia

=== Second leg ===
30 July 1988

Corvinul Hunedoara (Romania)	0–1	(Romania) Argeș Pitești
		Eduard 83'

Odorheiu Secuiesc

Argeș Pitești won 2–1 on aggregate.

1988

Sliven (Bulgaria)	1–3	(Bulgaria) Slavia Sofia

Hadzhi Dimitar Stadium, Sliven

Slavia Sofia won 4–2 on aggregate.

== Finals ==
Team 1	Agg.	Team 2	1st leg	2nd leg
Slavia Sofia (Bulgaria)	6–1	(Romania) Argeș Pitești	5–1	1–0

=== First leg ===
16 August 1988

Slavia Sofia (Bulgaria)	5–1	(Romania) Argeș Pitești
Aleksandrov 1' 11' 71'; Simionov 9'; Pîrvu 73' (o.g.)	Report	D. Zamfir 53'

Slavia Stadium, Sofia

=== Second leg ===
24 August 1988

Argeș Pitești (Romania)	0–1	(Bulgaria) Slavia Sofia
	Report	Mitev 64'

1 Mai, Pitești

Slavia Sofia won 6–1 on aggregate.
