= 1984 UEFA European Under-21 Championship squads =

This article displays the squads for the 1984 UEFA European Under-21 Championship. Although teams could have a maximum of three older players, the remaining squad members had to have been born on or after 1 January 1960. Players in bold have later been capped at full international level.

== Albania ==
Managers: (Albania) Shyqyri Rreli and (Albania) Ramazan Rragami

The following players participated in the 1984 UEFA European Under-21 Championship two-legged match against Italy U21 on 14 March & 4 April 1984.

No.	Pos.	Player	Date of birth (age)	Caps	Goals	Club
11	MF	**Sulejman Demollari**	15 May 1964 (aged 19)	2	0	(Albanian Football Federation) Dinamo Tirana
16	DF	**Fatbardh Jera**	8 November 1960 (aged 23)	2	0	(Albanian Football Federation) Vllaznia Shkodër
8	MF	**Mirel Josa**	1 June 1963 (aged 20)	2	0	(Albanian Football Federation) 17 Nëntori Tirana
1	GK	**Halim Mersini**	22 September 1961 (aged 22)	2	0	(Albanian Football Federation) 17 Nëntori Tirana
14	DF	**Adnan Oçelli**	6 August 1963 (aged 20)	2	0	(Albanian Football Federation) Partizani Tirana
6	MF	Albert Topçiu	28 January 1961 (aged 23)	2	0	(Albanian Football Federation) 17 Nëntori Tirana
4	DF	Agim Canaj	14 July 1962 (aged 21)	2	0	(Albanian Football Federation) Dinamo Tirana
18	MF	**Arben Vila**	16 January 1961 (aged 23)	2	0	(Albanian Football Federation) 17 Nëntori Tirana
9	FW	**Sefedin Braho**	18 August 1953 (aged 30)	1	0	(Albanian Football Federation) Luftëtari Gjirokastër
3	DF	**Muhedin Targaj**	19 March 1955 (aged 28)	1	0	(Albanian Football Federation) Dinamo Tirana
15	MF	**Hysen Zmijani**	29 April 1963 (aged 20)	1	0	(Albanian Football Federation) Vllaznia Shkodër
7	FW	**Sokol Kushta**	17 April 1964 (aged 19)	1	0	(Albanian Football Federation) Flamurtari Vlorë
5	MF	**Haxhi Ballgjini**	15 June 1958 (aged 25)	1	0	(Albanian Football Federation) Lokomotiva Durrës
19	MF	**Skënder Hodja**	30 May 1960 (aged 23)	1	0	(Albanian Football Federation) 17 Nëntori Tirana
2	DF	Leonard Liti	12 December 1961 (aged 22)	1	0	(Albanian Football Federation) 17 Nëntori Tirana
13	FW	Viktor Briza	4 May 1962 (aged 21)	1	0	(Albanian Football Federation) Vllaznia Shkodër

== England ==
Manager: (England) Dave Sexton

The following players participated in the 1984 UEFA European Under-21 Championship.

No.	Pos.	Player	Date of birth (age)	Caps	Goals	Club
1	GK	**Gary Bailey**	9 August 1958 (aged 25)			(The Football Association) Manchester United F.C.
13	GK	Peter Hucker	28 October 1959 (aged 24)			(The Football Association) Queens Park Rangers F.C.
2	DF	Tommy Caton	6 October 1962 (aged 21)			(The Football Association) Arsenal F.C.
3	DF	**Gary Mabbutt**	23 August 1961 (aged 22)			(The Football Association) Tottenham Hotspur F.C.
5	DF	Derek Mountfield	2 November 1962 (aged 21)			(The Football Association) Everton F.C.
12	DF	**Mel Sterland**	1 October 1961 (aged 22)			(The Football Association) Sheffield Wednesday F.C.
24	DF	**Gary Stevens**	30 March 1962 (aged 21)			(The Football Association) Tottenham Hotspur F.C.
16	DF	**Danny Thomas**	12 November 1961 (aged 22)			(The Football Association) Tottenham Hotspur F.C.
19	DF	**Dave Watson**	20 November 1961 (aged 22)			(The Football Association) Norwich City F.C.
4	MF	**Nick Pickering**	4 August 1963 (aged 20)			(The Football Association) Sunderland A.F.C.
6	MF	**Paul Bracewell**	19 July 1962 (aged 21)			(The Football Association) Sunderland A.F.C.
10	MF	Kevin Brock	9 September 1962 (aged 21)			(The Football Association) Oxford United F.C.
11	MF	Nigel Callaghan	12 September 1962 (aged 21)			(The Football Association) Watford F.C.
23	MF	**Steve Hodge**	25 October 1962 (aged 21)			(The Football Association) Nottingham Forest F.C.
15	MF	Stewart Robson	6 November 1964 (aged 19)			(The Football Association) Arsenal F.C.
17	MF	**Mark Chamberlain**	19 November 1961 (aged 22)			(The Football Association) Stoke City F.C.
20	MF	**Danny Wallace**	21 January 1961 (aged 23)			(The Football Association) Southampton F.C.
8	FW	**Paul Walsh**	1 October 1962 (aged 21)			(The Football Association) Luton Town F.C.
9	FW	Mich d'Avray	19 February 1962 (aged 22)			(The Football Association) Ipswich Town F.C.
14	FW	Howard Gayle	18 May 1958 (aged 25)			(The Football Association) Birmingham City F.C.
18	FW	**Mark Hateley**	7 November 1961 (aged 22)			(The Football Association) Portsmouth F.C.
21	FW	Steve Moran	10 January 1961 (aged 23)			(The Football Association) Southampton F.C.
7	FW	**Brian Stein**	19 October 1957 (aged 26)			(The Football Association) Luton Town F.C.
