= 1989 Albanian Supercup =

- Event: Albanian Supercup
Dinamo Tirana	17 Nëntori
2	0
- Date: 11 January 1990
- Venue: Qemal Stafa Stadium, Tirana
- Referee: Plarent Kotherja
- Attendance: 10,000

The 1989 Albanian Supercup was the first edition of the Albanian Supercup since its establishment in 1989. The match was contested between the 1988–89 Albanian Cup winners Dinamo Tirana and the 1988–89 Albanian Superliga champions 17 Nëntori. Dinamo won the match 2–0.

== Match details ==
11 January 1990
14:00 CET

Dinamo Tirana	2–0	17 Nëntori
Abazi 4'; Demollari 84' (pen.)

Qemal Stafa Stadium, Tirana
Attendance: 10,000
Referee: Plarent Kotherja

== See also ==
- 1988–89 Albanian Superliga
- 1988–89 Albanian Cup
