= Skënder Hodja =

Albanian footballer

Personal information
- Full name: Skënder Hodja
- Date of birth: 30 May 1960 (age 66)
- Place of birth: Albania
- Position: Midfielder

Senior career*
Years	Team	Apps	(Gls)
1984–1991	17 Nëntori Tirana		

International career
1984–1990	Albania	21	(0)
- * Club domestic league appearances and goals

Skënder Hodja (born 30 May 1960) is an Albanian retired footballer.

== Playing career ==
=== Club ===
His former team is 17 Nëntori Tirana, where he played all of his career and won three league titles in a team boasting the likes of international players Mirel Josa, Shkëlqim Muça, Arben Minga and Agustin Kola.

=== International ===
Hodja was part of Albania's 1984 UEFA European Under-21 Championship squad. He made his senior debut for Albania in an October 1984 FIFA World Cup qualification match against Belgium and earned a total of 21 caps, scoring no goals. His final international was a November 1990 European Championship qualification match against France.

== Managerial career ==
He is currently the head coach of KF Tirana U-17.

== Honours ==
- Albanian Superliga (3): 1984–85, 1987–88, 1988–89
