= Ermal Tahiri =

Albanian footballer

Personal information
- Full name: Ermal Tahiri
- Date of birth: 27 April 1969 (age 57)
- Place of birth: Tirana, Albania
- Position: Midfielder

Senior career*
Years	Team	Apps	(Gls)
1988–1992	Dinamo Tirana	50	(10)
1995–1996	PAS Giannina	20	(0)
1996–1997	Ialysos	22	(5)
1997–1998	Panegialios	26	(1)
1998–1999	PAS Giannina	10	(0)
1999–2000	Thesprotos	13	(7)
2000–2001	Marko		
Total		141	(23)

International career
1990–1991	Albania	4	(0)
- * Club domestic league appearances and goals

Ermal Tahiri (born 27 April 1969) is an Albanian retired footballer who played as a midfielder for a number of clubs in Albania and Greece as well as for the Albania national team.

== Club career ==
Tahiri began his career in Albania, playing several seasons with Dinamo Tirana and winning the 1989–90 Albanian championship.

Tahiri moved to Greece to play in the Greek second division with PAS Giannina on a six-month contract in December 1995. He would move to Ialysos and Panegialios before returning to PAS Giannina for six months in December 1997.

== International career ==
He made his debut for Albania in a September 1990 friendly match against Greece and earned a total of 4 caps, scoring no goals. His final international was another friendly against Greece, in September 1991.

== Personal life ==
Today he runs a business in the Greek city of Ioannina and he is coach of the junior team of PAS Giannina. In 2014, he was director of the Loro Boriçi National Football School.

== Honours ==
Dinamo Tirana

- Albanian Superliga: 1990
