= Sulejman Demollari =

Albanian footballer and coach

Personal information
- Date of birth: 15 May 1964 (age 62)
- Place of birth: Tirana, Albania
- Position: Midfielder

Senior career*
Years	Team	Apps	(Gls)
1980–1991	Dinamo Tirana (Note: The statistics for the 1982–83, 1983–84, 1984–85, 1985–86 and 1986–87 Albanian National Championship seasons are unavailable.)	124	(40)
1991–1994	Dinamo București	100	(36)
1995	Panionios	24	(1)
1996–1997	Győr	5	(1)

International career
1982	Albania U18	3	(0)
1982–1984	Albania U21	10	(1)
1983–1995	Albania	45	(1)

Managerial career
- 2001–2002: Albania
- 2003–2004: Dinamo Tirana
- 2004–2005: Lushnja
- 2005–2006: Shkumbini
- 2006: Lushnja
- 2006: Dinamo Tirana
- 2009–2011: Albania U15
- 2015–2024: Albania U19 (assistant)
- * Club domestic league appearances and goals

Sulejman Demollari (born 15 May 1964 in Tirana) also known as Sul Demollari is an Albanian former football player and coach.

== Early life ==
Demollari was born on 15 May 1964 in Albania's capital Tirana, where he completed his primary education at the Qemal Stafa High School. From a young age he was part of the 'KF Vojo Kushi' sports institution. Despite still being in school, Demollari had impressed many football specialists and was quickly picked to play for Dinamo Tirana's youth team where he managed to become one of its best players. At just the age of 15 he was called up to play for Dinamo's senior team, alongside fellow midfield legends such as Ilir Përnaska, Shyqyri Ballgjini and Muhedin Targaj.

== Club career ==
=== Dinamo Tirana ===
Demollari played his entire career in Albania for Dinamo Tirana, alongside fellow internationals Genc Ibro, Eduard Abazi and Agim Canaj. His first performance was winning the 1985–86 title under coach Fatmir Frashëri. In the same season, he helped the club get past Hamrun Spartans in the first round of the 1985–86 UEFA Cup, being eliminated by Sporting Lisbon in the second round. In the following season, Demollari played in both legs of the 3–0 aggregate loss to Beşiktaş in the first round of the 1986–87 European Cup. Afterwards he won the 1988–89 Albanian Cup with Dinamo, scoring a brace in the 3–1 win over Partizani in the final.

Dinamo started the following season by winning the 1989 Albanian Supercup, with Demollari netting a penalty in the 84th minute for a 2–0 victory against 17 Nëntori. Then he scored two goals in the preliminary round of the 1989–90 European Cup Winners' Cup, as his side eliminated Chernomorets Burgas with 5–3 on aggregate, but were defeated in the following round by Dinamo București. They finished the season by winning The Double and Demollari contributed with 14 goals in the 33 league matches that coach Bejkush Birçe used him. Subsequently, he helped them win the 1990 Albanian Supercup by scoring in the 83rd minute for a 3–3 draw against Flamurtari Vlorë, leading to extra time and an eventual penalty shoot-out victory. Then he played in both matches of the 5–1 aggregate loss to Olympique Marseille in the first round of the 1990–91 European Cup.

=== Dinamo București ===
Following the fall of communism, Demollari was among the first players to pursue a career abroad, signing for Romanian side Dinamo București in 1991. Demollari was wanted there by coach Florin Halagian, who had seen him in an Albania U21 – West Germany U21 1–1 draw, and he also made a good impression when he played against them in Dinamo Tirana's 2–1 aggregate loss in the 1989–90 European Cup Winners' Cup. Demollari made his Divizia A debut on 25 August 1991 in a 6–0 victory against Petrolul Ploiești in which he scored two goals and provided an assist, being nicknamed "Dobrin of Albania" by the Gazeta Sporturilor newspaper. He became the first foreign player to score in the derby against Steaua București, netting the only goal of a 1–0 victory. Afterwards, the fans had a chant dedicated to him during the games:Demollari omoară militarii (English: Demollari kills the military men). In his first season spent at the club, Demollari scored 18 goals in 30 league games and was the team's second top-scorer after Gábor Gerstenmájer, helping Dinamo win the title undefeated. In the same season, he played in Dinamo's 2–1 victory on aggregate against Luis Figo's Sporting Lisbon in the 1991–92 UEFA Cup.

In the following season, Demollari scored a goal that helped them advance past Kuusysi Lahti in the first round of the 1992–93 Champions League. Dinamo faced Olympique Marseille in the second round, where they drew 0–0 in the first leg but lost the subsequent game with 2–0, the French ultimately winning the competition. His last Divizia A appearance took place on 7 December 1994 in a 4–0 loss to Inter Sibiu. Demollari appeared in a total of 100 Divizia A matches in which he scored 36 goals and received only one yellow card, being considered one of the best foreign footballers who played in Romania.

=== Panionios and Győr ===
Demollari went to play in 1995 at Greek side Panionios. There, he was coached by Emerich Jenei. He made 24 league appearances for Panionios in which he scored once.

Subsequently, Demollari joined Hungarian team Győr, making his Nemzeti Bajnokság I debut under coach József Póczik on 16 March 1996 in a 2–1 loss to Budapest Honvéd. On 20 April he netted a goal in a 3–2 victory against Csepel. That was his only goal scored in the five league matches played for Győr.

He played a total of 25 games with three goals scored in European competitions. Throughout his career, Demollari was named player of the season on six occasions by the Sporti Popullor newspaper in 1983, 1985, 1991, 1992, 1993 and 1994.

== International career ==
Demollari represented Albania's under-18 national team in the 1982 European Championship, playing three games as his side failed to progress from their group. He was also part of Albania's under-21 generation that finished first in the 1984 European Championship qualification group, above West Germany U21, against whom he scored once in a 1–1 draw. The team reached the quarter-finals where they were eliminated by Italy U21 after a double 1–0 loss.

Demollari played 45 matches and scored one goal for Albania, making his debut on 27 April 1983 under coach Shyqyri Rreli in a 1–0 loss to Northern Ireland during the Euro 1984 qualifiers. He played six games in the 1986 World Cup qualifiers, including a 2–0 victory against Belgium. Demollari went on to play six games during the Euro 1988 qualifiers, another six in the 1990 World Cup qualifiers and five during the Euro 1992 qualifiers, but with the exception of a 1–0 win over Iceland, all the other matches were losses. Subsequently, he made nine appearances in which he scored his only goal for the national team in a 3–1 loss to Lithuania in the 1994 World Cup qualifiers. His last nine matches for the national team were during the Euro 1996 qualifiers, with the last one taking place on 7 October 1995 in a 3–0 loss to Bulgaria. Of his 45 caps, only three were friendlies, in 41 he was in the starting XI and he was captain in 18 matches.

In 2021, the International Federation of Football History & Statistics (IFFHS) included Demollari in its "Albania's all-time dream team" first XI.

=== International goals ===
Scores and results list Albania's goal tally first, score column indicates score after each Demollari goal.

List of international goals scored by Sulejman Demollari
#	Date	Venue	Cap	Opponent	Score	Result	Competition
1	14 April 1993	Žalgirio stadionas, Vilnius, Lithuania	33	Lithuania	1–3	1–3	1994 World Cup qualifiers

== Managerial career ==
Demollari started his coaching career at Albania's national team, making his debut on 1 September 2001 in a 2–0 loss to Finland in the 2002 World Cup qualifiers. Four days later he led the team in another 2–0 loss to England in the same qualifiers. On 27 March 2002, Albania defeated Azerbaijan 1–0 in a friendly. Demollari's last match at the national team was a 2–0 friendly loss to Andorra, having a total of 9 games (1 victory, 3 draws, 5 losses).

Subsequently, he coached the club at which he began his playing career, Dinamo Tirana during the 2003–04 season. Then he worked for Lushnja on two occasions, Shkumbini and had a second spell at Dinamo Tirana in 2006.

In 2009, Demollari became the first coach of Albania's under-15 national team. He led them during the 2010 Summer Youth Olympics qualifiers, where after defeating Liechtenstein 2–0, they lost 2–1 to Montenegro, thus failing to qualify. From 2011 to 2012, Demollari worked as a scout for Dinamo București, bringing Elis Bakaj to the club. Afterwards he worked as an assistant coach for Albania U19 between 2015 and 2024.

== Personal life ==
On 11 May 2018, Demollari was awarded by the President of Albania, Ilir Meta, with the "Mjeshtër i Madh" – (Grand Master) title.

== Honours ==
=== Club ===
Dinamo Tirana

- Kategoria Superiore: 1985–86, 1989–90
- Albanian Cup: 1988–89, 1989–90
- Albanian Supercup: 1989, 1990

Dinamo București

- Divizia A: 1991–92

=== Individual ===
- Sporti Popullor player of the season: 1983, 1985, 1991, 1992, 1993, 1994
- Mjeshtër i Merituar i Sportit (Deserved Master of Sport)
- Nderi i Sportit Shqiptar (Honour of Albanian Sport)
- Captain of Albania Senior, U-21 and youth national teams
