= Lubonja =

Lubonja is an Albanian surname. Notable people with the surname include:

- Fatos Lubonja (born 1951), Albanian writer and dissident
- Stavri Lubonja (1935–2024), Albanian footballer and manager
