= Ilir Bozhiqi =

Albanian retired footballer

Personal information
- Date of birth: 22 May 1965 (age 61)
- Place of birth: Kuçovë, PR Albania
- Position: Goalkeeper

Senior career*
Years	Team	Apps	(Gls)
1984–1985	Naftëtari Qyteti Stalin		
1985–1991	Dinamo Tirana		
1991–1995	FC Brașov	57	(0)
1995–1996	Tractorul Brașov		
- * Club domestic league appearances and goals

Ilir Bozhiqi (born 22 May 1965 in Qyteti Stalin) is an Albanian retired footballer who played as a goalkeeper for Dinamo Tirana.

== Club career ==
Bozhiqi started his career with hometown club Naftëtari Qyteti Stalin, before moving to Dinamo Tirana, with whom he won two league titles and two Albanian cups in six years. He played in the infamous promotion/relegation playoff match in Qyteti Stalin against his former club Naftëtari in June 1988, which ended in riots and burning of the Dinamo team bus and led to the suspension of Naftëtari from playing football for a year.

He was the first foreign goalkeeper to play in the Romanian football. He transferred from Dinamo Tirana to FC Brașov in 1991, where he stayed for four seasons, before moving to another Romanian team Tractorul Braşov in 1995. In his spell at FC Braşov he came up to 57 caps in the first division, although having tough competition from teammates Şanta, Todericiu and Adrian Ene. In this time he also learned Romanian, saying in a visit back there: "The time spent in Romania was the most beautiful of my career. I can not forget Braşov and the colleagues that I had, starting from Şanta and Ene, up to Săvoiu and Marian Ivan."

== Retirement ==
He started a career as a goalkeeping coach and worked with Dinamo from 1997 to 2012, Skenderbeu from 2012 to 2020, Partizani from 2020 to 2023 and now is back at Dinamo.He is also the goalkeeper coach of the Albania national team and has been working there since 2008.

== Honours ==
- Albanian Superliga: 2

1986, 1990
