= Lorenc Leskaj =

Albanian footballer

Personal information
- Date of birth: 2 October 1968 (age 58)
- Place of birth: Tirana, Albania
- Height: 1.78 m (5 ft 10 in)
- Position: Defender

Senior career*
Years	Team	Apps	(Gls)
1986–1991	Partizani Tirana		

International career
1990	Albania	2	(0)
- * Club domestic league appearances and goals

Lorenc Leskaj (born 2 October 1968) is an Albanian retired footballer who played as a defender for Partizani Tirana.

== Club career ==
Leskaj played for Partizani Tirana in an infamous September 1987 European Cup first leg in Lisbon against Benfica that saw Partizani lose 4–0 and end the game with 7 men as 4 players were sent off and with Leskaj himself getting a yellow card. Partizani were punished by UEFA for the incidents, and they were knocked out of the competition following a walkover victory for Benfica in what would have been the second leg, and they were also banned from Europe for 4 years.

== International career ==
He made his debut for Albania in a September 1990 friendly match against Greece and earned a total of 2 caps, scoring no goals.

His second and final international was a November 1990 European Championship qualification match against France.

=== Defection ===
Leskaj, alongside national team members Genc Ibro and Eduard Kaçaçi, disappeared from the national team squad in March 1991 in Geneva on their way to Paris to play a European Championship qualifier against France. At the time, Albania was still ruled by the communists. The players were later reported to have sought asylum in Switzerland.

== Honours ==
- Albanian Superliga: 1

1987
