= Stavri Lubonja =

Albanian footballer and manager (1935–2024)

Personal information
- Date of birth: 12 September 1935
- Place of birth: Korçë, Albania
- Date of death: 27 December 2024 (aged 89)
- Position: Forward

Senior career*
Years	Team	Apps	(Gls)
1955–1961	Dinamo Tirana		

Managerial career
- -1968: Flamurtari
- 1979–1981: Dinamo Tirana
- * Club domestic league appearances and goals

Stavri Lubonja (12 September 1935 – 27 December 2024) was an Albanian football player and manager.

== Playing career ==
Lubonja spent his six-year playing career with capital club Dinamo Tirana, winning three national championships.

During the 1959 season, Lubonja was the league's top goalscorer with 11 goals, with Dinamo, who finished in 3rd place.

== Managerial career ==
Lubonja also served at Dinamo Tirana as the manager in 1979–1981, winning the league in the 1979–80 season.

== Personal life and death ==
Lubonja was married to his long-time partner Mediha Lubonja (née Veçani), who was a dancer. He also held American citizenship, since his father had emigrated to the USA only to return to Korçë in 1931, four years before Stavri was born.

Lubonja died on 27 December 2024, at the age of 89.

== Honours ==
Dinamo Tirana

- Albanian Superliga: 1955, 1956, 1960
