= 1987–88 Kategoria e Dytë =

Kategoria e Dytë
- Season: 1987–88
- Champions: Traktori
- Promoted: Traktori
- Relegated: Dajti; Tërbuni; Minatori (T); Vetëtima; Naftëtari (expelled)

The 1987–88 Kategoria e Dytë was the 41st season of a second-tier association football league in Albania.

== Group A ==
=== First phase ===
Pos	Team	Pld	W	D	L	GF	GA	GD	Pts	Qualification
1	Traktori	18	10	5	3	22	13	+9	25	Qualification for the Championship round
2	Veleçiku	18	9	4	5	21	11	+10	22	Qualification for the Championship round
3	Erzeni	18	8	4	6	25	22	+3	20	Qualification for the Championship round
4	Korabi	18	7	5	6	23	18	+5	19	Qualification for the Championship round
5	Perparimi	18	7	5	6	22	19	+3	19	Qualification for the Championship round
6	Studenti	18	5	8	5	27	18	+9	18	Qualification for the Championship round
7	Ylli i Kuq (Note: Ylli i Kuq was deducted 4 points.)	18	9	4	5	23	16	+7	18	Qualification for the Relegation round
8	Dajti	18	4	8	6	23	28	−5	16	Qualification for the Relegation round
9	10 Korriku	18	5	6	7	22	29	−7	16	Qualification for the Relegation round
10	Tërbuni	18	0	3	15	17	51	−34	3	Qualification for the Relegation round

=== Final phase ===
==== Championship round ====
Pos	Team	Pld	W	D	L	GF	GA	GD	Pts	Qualification
1	Traktori (C, P)	28	16	5	7	38	19	+19	37	Qualification for the Championship final
2	Perparimi	28	13	8	7	36	25	+11	34	
3	Veleçiku	28	13	7	8	34	22	+12	33	
4	Erzeni	28	10	9	9	36	38	−2	29	
5	Korabi	28	9	10	9	37	36	+1	28	
6	Studenti	28	7	11	10	37	34	+3	25	

(C) Champions; (P) Promoted

==== Relegation round ====
Pos	Team	Pld	W	D	L	GF	GA	GD	Pts	Relegation
7	Ylli i Kuq (Note: Ylli i Kuq was deducted 4 points .)	24	11	7	6	28	21	+7	25	
8	10 Korriku	24	8	7	9	34	34	0	23	
9	Dajti (R)	24	7	8	9	31	37	−6	22	Relegation to 1988–89 Kategoria e Tretë
10	Tërbuni (R)	24	0	4	20	21	66	−45	4	Relegation to 1988–89 Kategoria e Tretë

(R) Relegated
Notes:

Note: The final records are inconsistent with those of the first phase.

== Group B ==
=== First phase ===
Pos	Team	Pld	W	D	L	GF	GA	GD	Pts	Qualification
1	Naftëtari	18	8	4	6	26	17	+9	20	Qualification for the Championship round
2	Bistrica	18	8	4	6	18	19	−1	20	Qualification for the Championship round
3	Butrinti	18	7	4	7	23	21	+2	18	Qualification for the Championship round
4	5 Shtatori	18	7	4	7	18	21	−3	18	Qualification for the Championship round
5	Ballshi i Ri	18	7	4	7	16	19	−3	18	Qualification for the Championship round
6	Kastrioti	18	7	3	8	20	21	−1	17	Qualification for the Championship round
7	Sopoti	18	7	3	8	20	22	−2	17	Qualification for the Relegation round
8	24 Maji	18	7	3	8	18	20	−2	17	Qualification for the Relegation round
9	Minatori (T) (Note: Minatori (T) was deducted 4 points.)	18	9	2	7	21	17	+4	16	Qualification for the Relegation round
10	Vetëtima	18	5	5	8	17	20	−3	15	Qualification for the Relegation round

=== Final phase ===
==== Championship round ====
Pos	Team	Pld	W	D	L	GF	GA	GD	Pts	Qualification
1	Naftëtari (D)	28	15	6	7	52	31	+21	36	Qualification for the Championship final
2	Bistrica	28	13	6	9	38	36	+2	32	
3	Butrinti	28	10	7	11	34	34	0	27	
4	Ballshi i Ri	28	11	5	12	26	33	−7	27	
5	Kastrioti	28	10	5	13	37	39	−2	25	
6	5 Shtatori	28	9	6	13	29	40	−11	24	

(D) Disqualified

==== Relegation round ====
Pos	Team	Pld	W	D	L	GF	GA	GD	Pts	Relegation
7	Sopoti	24	13	2	9	32	25	+7	28	
8	24 Maji	24	10	4	10	23	25	−2	24	
9	Minatori (T) (Note: Minatori (T) was deducted 4 points.) (R)	24	10	3	11	28	28	0	19	Relegation to 1988–89 Kategoria e Tretë
10	Vetëtima (R)	24	6	6	12	24	32	−8	18	Relegation to 1988–89 Kategoria e Tretë

(R) Relegated
Notes:

Note: The final records are inconsistent with those of the first phase.

== Championship final ==
Team 1	Score	Team 2
Traktori	3–0	Naftëtari

With the win, Traktori was promoted to the 1989–90 National Championship. However, Naftëtari had another chance for promotion, as the losing team played another two-legged tie against the 11th placed team of the National Championship Dinamo Tirana.

== Promotion/relegation playoffs and Qyteti Stalin riots ==
After losing the first match 1–0 away to Albanian giants and Ministry of Interior club Dinamo Tirana, the second match in Qyteti Stalin on 5 June 1988 ended in riots and burning of the Dinamo team bus partly because the game was led by a referee and assistants from Tirana. Dinamo also won the second leg 1-0- and the subsequent riots led to the suspension of Naftëtari from playing football for a year and demotion to the third tier. Their coach Pandi Angjeli and players Meta and Makashi were suspended for life and club manager Fatmir Ismaili was dismissed.

Team 1	Agg.	Team 2	1st leg	2nd leg
Dinamo Tirana	2–0	Naftëtari	1–0	1–0
