= 1989–90 Albanian Cup =

Kupa e Shqipërisë

Tournament details
- Country: Albania

Final positions
- Champions: Dinamo Tirana
- Runners-up: Flamurtari

1989–90 Albanian Cup (Albanian: Kupa e Shqipërisë) was the thirty-eighth season of Albania's annual cup competition. It began in August 1989 with the First Round and ended in May 1990 with the Final match. The winners of the competition qualified for the 1990-91 first round of the UEFA Cup. Dinamo Tirana were the defending champions, having won their eleventh Albanian Cup last season. The cup was won by Dinamo Tirana.

The first round was played in a single round-robin matches within 4 qualifying groups. The other rounds were played in a two-legged format similar to those of European competitions. If the aggregated score was tied after both games, the team with the higher number of away goals advanced. If the number of away goals was equal in both games, the match was decided by extra time and a penalty shootout, if necessary.

== First round ==
Games were played on August & September 1989

=== Group A ===
Pos	Team	Pld	W	D	L	GF	GA	GD	Pts	Qualification
1	Flamurtari	6	5	1	0	18	1	+17	11	Advance to quarter-finals
2	17 Nëntori	6	4	1	1	12	2	+10	9	Advance to quarter-finals
3	Tomori	6	3	0	3	9	7	+2	6	
4	Kastrioti	6	2	2	2	3	7	−4	6	
5	5 Shtatori	6	2	1	3	3	8	−5	5	
6	31 Korriku	6	2	0	4	6	10	−4	4	
7	Minatori Rrëshen	6	0	1	5	6	22	−16	1	

Source: Calciomondialeweb.it
Rules for classification: 1) points; 2) goal difference; 3) number of goals scored.

=== Group B ===
Pos	Team	Pld	W	D	L	GF	GA	GD	Pts	Qualification
1	Vllaznia	6	4	1	1	11	7	+4	9	Advance to quarter-finals
2	24 Maji	6	4	0	2	11	7	+4	8	Advance to quarter-finals
3	Luftëtari	6	3	2	1	8	6	+2	8	
4	Traktori	6	1	4	1	7	6	+1	6	
5	Labinoti	6	2	1	3	12	12	0	5	
6	Butrinti	6	2	1	3	8	12	−4	5	
7	Minatori Tepelena	6	0	1	5	8	15	−7	1	

Source: Calciomondialeweb.it
Rules for classification: 1) points; 2) goal difference; 3) number of goals scored.

=== Group C ===
Pos	Team	Pld	W	D	L	GF	GA	GD	Pts	Qualification
1	Lokomotiva Durrës	6	5	1	0	14	4	+10	11	Advance to quarter-finals
2	Apolonia	6	4	1	1	15	5	+10	9	Advance to quarter-finals
3	Besëlidhja	6	3	1	2	11	10	+1	7	
4	Përparimi	6	2	1	3	7	7	0	5	
5	Korabi	6	2	0	4	10	13	−3	4	
6	Tërbuni	6	2	0	4	8	16	−8	4	
7	Valbona	6	1	0	5	6	16	−10	2	

Source: Calciomondialeweb.it
Rules for classification: 1) points; 2) goal difference; 3) number of goals scored.

=== Group D ===
Pos	Team	Pld	W	D	L	GF	GA	GD	Pts	Qualification
1	Partizani	6	5	1	0	18	7	+11	11	Advance to quarter-finals
2	Dinamo Tirana	6	4	2	0	18	3	+15	10	Advance to quarter-finals
3	Ylli i Kuq	6	3	1	2	6	9	−3	7	
4	Skënderbeu	6	3	0	3	10	6	+4	6	
5	Sopoti	6	2	0	4	6	14	−8	4	
6	Gramozi	6	1	1	4	4	13	−9	3	
7	10 Korriku	6	0	1	5	6	16	−10	1	

Source: Calciomondialeweb.it
Rules for classification: 1) points; 2) goal difference; 3) number of goals scored.

== Quarter-finals ==
In this round entered the 8 winners from the previous round.

Team 1	Agg.	Team 2	1st leg	2nd leg
24 Maji	1–3	Flamurtari	1–0	0–3
17 Nëntori	1–2	Vllaznia	1–0	0–2
Dinamo Tirana	3–2	Lokomotiva Durrës	1–1	2–1
Apolonia	2–1	Partizani	2–0	0–1

== Semi-finals ==
In this round entered the four winners from the previous round.

Team 1	Agg.	Team 2	1st leg	2nd leg
Dinamo Tirana	0–0 (4–3 p)	Vllaznia	0–0	0–0
Apolonia	1–2	Flamurtari	1–1	0–1

== Final ==
6 June 1990
17:00

Dinamo Tirana	1–1	Flamurtari
Xhafa 95'		Kushta 100' (pen.)
Penalties
Ibro (penalty scored); Stafa (penalty scored); Gjergji (penalty scored); Jançe (penalty scored)	4–2	(penalty scored) Memushi; (penalty missed) Paço; (penalty scored) Gjondeda; (penalty missed) Gj. Iljadhi

Niko Dovana Stadium, Durrës
Attendance: 14,500
Referee: Arseni Hoxha
