= 1988–89 Albanian National Championship =

Albanian National Championship
- Season: 1988–89
- Champions: 17 Nëntori; 14th Albanian title
- Relegated: Skënderbeu; Traktori
- European Cup: 17 Nëntori
- UEFA Cup: Dinamo Tirana
- Cup Winners' Cup: Apolonia
- Matches: 192
- Goals: 439 (2.29 per match)
- Top goalscorer: Agustin Kola (19 goals)

The 1988–89 Albanian National Championship was the 50th season of the Albanian National Championship, the top professional league for association football clubs, since its establishment in 1930.

== Overview ==
It was contested by 12 teams, and 17 Nëntori won the championship.

== First phase ==
=== League table ===
Pos	Team	Pld	W	D	L	GF	GA	GD	Pts	Qualification
1	17 Nëntori	22	14	4	4	39	18	+21	32	Qualification for the Championship round
2	Partizani	22	13	4	5	33	17	+16	30	Qualification for the Championship round
3	Dinamo Tirana	22	12	6	4	29	19	+10	30	Qualification for the Championship round
4	Apolonia	22	10	7	5	29	10	+19	27	Qualification for the Championship round
5	Besëlidhja	22	10	4	8	28	24	+4	24	Qualification for the Championship round
6	Labinoti	22	9	5	8	27	25	+2	23	Qualification for the Championship round
7	Vllaznia	22	9	4	9	28	26	+2	22	Qualification for the Relegation round
8	Flamurtari	22	9	2	11	26	30	−4	20	Qualification for the Relegation round
9	Lokomotiva Durrës	22	5	6	11	16	31	−15	16	Qualification for the Relegation round
10	Besa	22	7	1	14	27	36	−9	15	Qualification for the Relegation round
11	Skënderbeu	22	4	6	12	14	30	−16	14	Qualification for the Relegation round
12	Traktori	22	3	5	14	12	42	−30	11	Qualification for the Relegation round

Source: RSSSF.org

=== Results ===
Home \ Away	17N	APO	BES	BSL	DIN	FLA	LAB	LOK	PAR	SKË	TRA	VLL
17 Nëntori		1–0	2–1	2–1	3–0	2–1	1–0	1–0	0–2	2–0	7–0	5–2
Apolonia	0–1		5–0	0–0	0–1	1–0	2–0	6–0	1–0	1–0	1–1	2–1
Besa	0–2	2–0		3–3	0–1	1–0	4–0	1–0	1–2	2–1	3–1	1–2
Besëlidhja	1–2	1–1	2–1		0–1	1–0	2–1	1–1	1–0	2–0	2–0	1–0
Dinamo	1–2	1–0	1–0	2–1		4–1	1–1	2–2	1–1	2–0	1–0	0–0
Flamurtari	1–0	0–2	1–2	3–2	2–2		2–1	1–1	1–0	1–0	1–0	4–0
Labinoti	0–0	1–1	3–2	2–0	1–0	2–3		2–1	2–0	2–1	4–0	1–0
Lokomotiva	0–0	0–4	2–0	0–2	1–2	1–0	0–0		0–1	0–1	3–0	0–2
Partizani	3–2	0–0	1–0	1–0	2–0	4–2	2–1	3–0		5–0	2–0	1–1
Skënderbeu	2–1	0–0	3–2	1–2	0–0	1–2	1–1	1–1	2–0		0–0	0–1
Traktori	1–1	0–2	2–0	1–3	1–4	1–0	1–2	0–1	1–1	0–0		1–0
Vllaznia	2–2	0–0	2–1	2–0	1–2	2–0	1–0	1–2	1–2	3–0	4–1	

Source: CalcioMondialeWeb.it
Legend: Blue = home team win; Yellow = draw; Red = away team win.

== Final phase ==
=== Championship round ===
Pos	Team	Pld	W	D	L	GF	GA	GD	Pts	Qualification
1	17 Nëntori (C)	32	21	6	5	58	25	+33	48	Qualification for the European Cup first round
2	Partizani	32	18	9	5	48	23	+25	45	
3	Dinamo Tirana	32	16	10	6	46	31	+15	42	Qualification for the Cup Winners' Cup preliminary round
4	Apolonia	32	12	9	11	36	24	+12	33	Qualification for the UEFA Cup first round
5	Labinoti	32	12	7	13	37	37	0	31	
6	Besëlidhja	32	10	7	15	33	46	−13	27	

Source: RSSSF.org
(C) Champions

==== Results ====
Home \ Away	17N	APO	BSL	DIN	LAB	PAR
17 Nëntori		3–0	4–0	4–3	2–1	1–1
Apolonia	0–1		2–0	2–0	1–1	1–3
Besëlidhja	0–1	0–0		1–4	0–1	1–1
Dinamo	1–0	3–1	2–2		2–0	0–0
Labinoti	0–2	1–0	4–1	1–1		0–1
Partizani	1–1	2–0	3–0	1–1	2–1	

Source: CalcioMondialeWeb.it
Legend: Blue = home team win; Yellow = draw; Red = away team win.

=== Relegation round ===
Pos	Team	Pld	W	D	L	GF	GA	GD	Pts	Relegation
7	Vllaznia	32	14	9	9	46	33	+13	37	
8	Flamurtari	32	13	6	13	33	36	−3	32	
9	Besa	32	11	4	17	36	47	−11	26	
10	Lokomotiva Durrës	32	7	11	14	26	40	−14	25	
11	Skënderbeu (R)	32	6	9	17	21	43	−22	21	Relegation to the 1989–90 Kategoria e Dytë
12	Traktori (R)	32	4	9	19	19	54	−35	17	Relegation to the 1989–90 Kategoria e Dytë

Source: RSSSF.org
(R) Relegated

Note: '17 Nëntori' is Tirana, 'Labinoti' is Elbasani, 'Lokomotiva Durrës' is Teuta, 'Traktori' is Lushnja

==== Results ====
Home \ Away	BES	FLA	LOK	SKË	TRA	VLL
Besa		1–2	2–1	1–0	2–1	0–0
Flamurtari	0–0		1–0	0–0	1–0	1–1
Lokomotiva	2–0	0–1		2–0	2–2	0–0
Skënderbeu	1–1	1–0	2–2		1–0	1–2
Traktori	0–1	0–0	0–0	3–0		0–0
Vllaznia	4–1	3–1	1–1	2–1	5–1	

Source: CalcioMondialeWeb.it
Legend: Blue = home team win; Yellow = draw; Red = away team win.

== Season statistics ==
=== Top scorers ===
Rank	Player	Club	Goals
1	(Albania) Agustin Kola	17 Nëntori	19
2	(Albania) Vladimir Tafani	Labinoti	16
3	(Albania) Pandeli Tole	Apolonia	12
4	(Albania) Eduard Abazi	Dinamo Tirana	11
5	(Albania) Sulejman Demollari	Dinamo Tirana	10
6	(Albania) Arben Minga	17 Nëntori	9
