= 1987–88 Albanian National Championship =

Albanian National Championship
- Season: 1987–88
- Champions: 17 Nëntori; 13th Albanian title
- Relegated: Luftëtari; Tomori; 31 Korriku
- European Cup: 17 Nëntori
- UEFA Cup: None
- Cup Winners' Cup: Flamurtari
- Matches: 268
- Goals: 546 (2.04 per match)
- Top goalscorer: Agustin Kola (18 goals)

The 1987–88 Albanian National Championship was the 49th season of the Albanian National Championship, the top professional league for association football clubs, since its establishment in 1930.

== Overview ==
It was contested by 14 teams, and 17 Nëntori won the championship.

== First phase ==
=== League table ===
Pos	Team	Pld	W	D	L	GF	GA	GD	Pts	Qualification or relegation
1	17 Nëntori	26	11	11	4	41	20	+21	33	Qualification for the Championship round
2	Flamurtari	26	10	9	7	38	27	+11	29	Qualification for the Championship round
3	Labinoti	26	10	9	7	22	19	+3	29	Qualification for the Championship round
4	Apolonia	26	11	6	9	36	28	+8	28	Qualification for the Championship round
5	Besa	26	8	12	6	28	22	+6	28	Qualification for the Championship round
6	Vllaznia	26	11	6	9	30	26	+4	28	Qualification for the Championship round
7	Besëlidhja	26	9	10	7	24	28	−4	28	Qualification for the Relegation round
8	Lokomotiva Durrës	26	9	9	8	27	28	−1	27	Qualification for the Relegation round
9	Partizani	26	9	8	9	38	34	+4	26	Qualification for the Relegation round
10	Skënderbeu	26	8	10	8	17	26	−9	26	Qualification for the Relegation round
11	Dinamo Tirana	26	7	11	8	33	32	+1	25	Qualification for the Relegation round
12	Luftëtari	26	7	10	9	19	19	0	24	Qualification for the Relegation round
13	Tomori (R)	26	8	7	11	29	34	−5	23	Relegation to the 1988–89 Kategoria e Dytë
14	31 Korriku (R)	26	3	4	19	22	61	−39	10	Relegation to the 1988–89 Kategoria e Dytë

Source: RSSSF.org
(R) Relegated

Note 1: After the regular season, Tomori and 31 Korriku were relegated immediately, while the other 12 teams were divided in 2 groups in the final phase

=== Results ===
Home \ Away	17N	31K	APO	BES	BSL	DIN	FLA	LAB	LOK	LUF	PAR	SKË	TOM	VLL
17 Nëntori		4–0	1–1	1–1	1–0	1–1	4–2	2–0	1–1	0–0	3–1	3–0	4–1	3–1
31 Korriku	1–4		2–0	0–1	2–2	0–4	2–3	1–0	1–2	1–3	0–0	0–1	1–1	2–0
Apolonia	1–2	1–0		2–1	5–0	1–1	3–2	1–0	4–0	1–0	3–0	0–0	1–0	2–1
Besa	1–1	6–1	3–1		1–1	1–0	0–0	1–0	2–2	0–0	1–1	0–0	1–1	1–0
Besëlidhja	0–0	3–1	1–1	2–1		0–0	1–0	1–1	2–1	1–0	0–0	3–1	2–1	1–3
Dinamo	0–0	2–0	1–3	0–1	4–0		2–2	1–1	1–0	1–1	4–3	1–1	4–3	1–3
Flamurtari	1–0	6–0	1–1	1–0	1–0	0–0		4–1	0–0	1–0	3–0	0–0	1–1	2–1
Labinoti	2–1	3–0	1–1	0–0	0–0	2–1	1–0		1–0	0–0	2–0	1–1	1–0	1–0
Lokomotiva	1–1	3–3	1–0	1–0	1–0	2–1	2–1	1–1		3–0	0–0	2–0	1–0	0–0
Luftëtari	0–0	2–1	2–1	0–0	0–1	3–0	2–2	0–0	2–0		1–1	1–0	2–1	1–1
Partizani	1–1	5–2	4–1	3–1	0–1	3–1	3–2	0–1	2–1	0–0		5–0	2–2	1–0
Skënderbeu	1–3	1–0	1–0	2–1	0–0	1–1	0–0	1–0	1–1	1–0	1–0		1–0	0–1
Tomori	1–0	1–0	2–1	1–2	1–0	0–0	2–3	1–2	1–0	1–0	3–2	1–1		3–2
Vllaznia	1–0	3–1	1–0	1–1	2–2	1–1	1–0	1–0	3–1	1–0	0–1	2–1	0–0	

Source: CalcioMondialeWeb.it
Legend: Blue = home team win; Yellow = draw; Red = away team win.

== Final phase ==
=== Championship round ===
Pos	Team	Pld	W	D	L	GF	GA	GD	Pts	Qualification
1	17 Nëntori (C)	36	18	12	6	59	29	+30	48	Qualification for the European Cup first round
2	Flamurtari	36	15	11	10	55	38	+17	41	Qualification for the Cup Winners' Cup first round
3	Labinoti	36	14	11	11	31	33	−2	39	
4	Apolonia	36	16	6	14	51	43	+8	38	
5	Besa	36	11	13	12	38	36	+2	35	
6	Vllaznia	36	13	8	15	40	42	−2	34	

Source: RSSSF.org
(C) Champions

==== Results ====
Home \ Away	17N	APO	BES	FLA	LAB	VLL
17 Nëntori		4–2	2–0	2–1	3–0	1–0
Apolonia	2–1		2–0	1–2	3–1	3–1
Besa	3–2	2–0		0–1	1–1	3–2
Flamurtari	0–0	1–2	2–1		3–0	4–1
Labinoti	0–1	1–0	1–0	3–2		1–0
Vllaznia	1–2	2–0	1–0	1–1	1–1	

Source: CalcioMondialeWeb.it
Legend: Blue = home team win; Yellow = draw; Red = away team win.

=== Relegation round ===
Pos	Team	Pld	W	D	L	GF	GA	GD	Pts	Qualification or relegation
7	Lokomotiva Durrës	36	11	16	9	34	35	−1	38	
8	Besëlidhja	36	12	14	10	38	42	−4	38	
9	Partizani	36	12	13	11	51	44	+7	37	
10	Skënderbeu	36	11	14	11	26	33	−7	36	
11	Dinamo Tirana (O)	36	10	14	12	41	42	−1	34	Qualification for the relegation play-offs
12	Luftëtari (R)	36	11	11	14	31	34	−3	33	Relegation to the 1988–89 Kategoria e Dytë

Source: RSSSF.org
(O) Play-off winners; (R) Relegated

Note 2: '17 Nëntori' is Tirana, 'Labinoti' is Elbasani, 'Lokomotiva Durrës' is Teuta

==== Results ====
Home \ Away	BSL	DIN	LOK	LUF	PAR	SKË
Besëlidhja		2–2	0–0	3–2	2–2	1–0
Dinamo	2–1		0–1	2–0	0–0	2–0
Lokomotiva	2–2	1–0		0–0	1–1	1–1
Luftëtari	2–1	1–0	3–1		1–2	1–0
Partizani	0–2	4–0	0–0	3–1		1–1
Skënderbeu	2–0	0–0	0–0	3–1	2–0	

Source: CalcioMondialeWeb.it
Legend: Blue = home team win; Yellow = draw; Red = away team win.

== Promotion/relegation playoffs and Qyteti Stalin riots ==
Naftëtari Qyteti Stalin qualified for a promotion/relegation playoff after finishing runners-up to second tier champions Traktori Lushnja. After losing the first match 1–0 away to Albanian giants and Ministry of Interior club Dinamo Tirana, the second match in Qyteti Stalin on 5 June 1988 ended in riots and burning of the Dinamo team bus partly because the game was led by a referee and assistants from Tirana. Dinamo also won the second leg 1-0- and the subsequent riots led to the suspension of Naftëtari from playing football for a year and demotion to the third tier. Their coach Pandi Angjeli and players Meta and Makashi were suspended for life and club manager Fatmir Ismaili was dismissed.

Team 1	Agg.	Team 2	1st leg	2nd leg
Dinamo Tirana	2–0	Naftëtari	1–0	1–0

== Season statistics ==
=== Top scorers ===
Rank	Player	Club	Goals
1	(Albania) Agustin Kola	17 Nëntori	18
2	(Albania) Arben Minga	17 Nëntori	16
3	(Albania) Ylli Shehu	Partizani	14
4	(Albania) Roland Agallin	Partizani	12
5	(Albania) Sokol Kushta	Flamurtari	10
5	(Albania) Agim Bubegi	Flamurtari	10
