= 1988–89 Kategoria e Dytë =

Kategoria e Dytë
- Season: 1988–89
- Champions: Luftëtari
- Promoted: Luftëtari; Tomori
- Relegated: None

The 1988–89 Kategoria e Dytë was the 42nd season of a second-tier association football league in Albania.

== Group A ==
=== First phase ===
Pos	Team	Pld	W	D	L	GF	GA	GD	Pts	Qualification
1	Tomori	18	12	4	2	39	10	+29	28	Qualification for the Championship round
2	Erzeni	18	9	7	2	22	15	+7	25	Qualification for the Championship round
3	Korabi	18	8	7	3	23	16	+7	23	Qualification for the Championship round
4	Turbina	18	7	3	8	18	17	+1	17	Qualification for the Championship round
5	Përparimi	18	6	5	7	20	21	−1	17	Qualification for the Championship round
6	Kastrioti	18	5	7	6	14	17	−3	17	Qualification for the Championship round
7	10 Korriku	18	4	6	8	12	23	−11	14	Qualification for the Placement round
8	Veleçiku	18	2	10	6	9	20	−11	14	Qualification for the Placement round
9	31 Korriku (Note: 31 Korriku and Studenti were deducted 4 points.)	18	5	6	7	16	17	−1	12	Qualification for the Placement round
10	Studenti	18	2	5	11	5	22	−17	5	Qualification for the Placement round

=== Final phase ===
==== Championship round ====
Pos	Team	Pld	W	D	L	GF	GA	GD	Pts	Promotion
1	Tomori (P)	28	18	6	4	52	19	+33	42	Promotion to 1989–90 National Championship
2	Erzeni	28	12	8	8	39	32	+7	32	
3	Korabi	28	16	7	5	38	25	+13	39	
4	Turbina	28	10	6	12	23	23	0	26	
5	Kastrioti	28	7	11	10	24	30	−6	25	
6	Përparimi	28	8	7	13	30	37	−7	23	

(P) Promoted

==== Placement round ====
Pos	Team	Pld	W	D	L	GF	GA	GD	Pts
7	Veleçiku	24	7	9	8	23	26	−3	23
8	31 Korriku (Note: 31 Korriku and Studenti were deducted 4 points.)	24	8	8	8	27	24	+3	20
9	10 Korriku	24	5	8	11	18	32	−14	18
10	Studenti	24	3	6	15	9	35	−26	8

== Group B ==
=== First phase ===
Pos	Team	Pld	W	D	L	GF	GA	GD	Pts	Qualification
1	Luftëtari	16	8	5	3	23	11	+12	21	Qualification for the Championship round
2	Minatori (T)	16	7	4	5	15	14	+1	18	Qualification for the Championship round
3	Bistrica	16	7	3	6	16	16	0	17	Qualification for the Championship round
4	24 Maji	16	7	3	6	13	15	−2	17	Qualification for the Championship round
5	Butrinti	16	5	6	5	16	11	+5	16	Qualification for the Championship round
6	5 Shtatori	16	7	3	6	16	20	−4	17	Qualification for the Championship round
7	Ylli i Kuq	16	5	6	5	12	10	+2	16	Qualification for the Placement round
8	Ballshi i Ri	16	6	4	6	12	11	+1	16	Qualification for the Placement round
9	Domozdova	16	1	4	11	7	22	−15	6	Qualification for the Placement round

=== Final phase ===
==== Championship round ====
Pos	Team	Pld	W	D	L	GF	GA	GD	Pts	Promotion
1	Luftëtari (C, P)	26	15	6	5	40	20	+20	36	Promotion to 1989–90 National Championship
2	Minatori (T)	26	12	6	8	29	29	0	30	
3	24 Maji	26	11	5	10	24	25	−1	27	
4	5 Shtatori	26	12	3	11	31	34	−3	27	
5	Bistrica	26	9	7	10	30	32	−2	25	
6	Butrinti	26	7	7	12	26	28	−2	21	

(C) Champions; (P) Promoted

==== Placement round ====
Pos	Team	Pld	W	D	L	GF	GA	GD	Pts
7	Ylli i Kuq	20	8	7	5	19	13	+6	23
8	Ballshi i Ri	20	8	5	7	19	16	+3	21
9	Domozdova	20	1	4	15	10	32	−22	6

== Championship playoff ==
Team 1	Score	Team 2
Luftëtari	3–0	Tomori
