= SSD Città di Teramo =

Italian football club

Teramo Calcio 1913
- Full name: Società Sportiva Dilettantistica; Città di Teramo
- Nicknames: Il diavolo (The Devil); Biancorossi (White and reds); Aprutini (Abruzzese)
- Founded: 25 August 1929; 97 years ago 2008 (refounded); 2022 (refounded)
- Ground: Stadio Gaetano Bonolis, Teramo, Italy
- Capacity: 7,498
- Chairman: Eddy Rastelli
- Manager: Marco Pomante
- League: Eccellenza Abruzzo
- 2022–23: Promozione Abruzzo Group B, 1st of 15 (promoted)
- Website: teramocalcio1913.it

Società Sportiva Dilettantistica Città di Teramo is an Italian association football club based in Teramo, Abruzzo that plays in Serie D.

The club was founded in 1929, but its origin is traditionally traced back to 1913 when the first football match was played in the city of Teramo. The team throughout its history has played mainly in Serie C.

The club's record includes two Serie C2 championships (1985–86 and 2001-2002) and three Serie D championships (1973–74, 1993–94 and 2011–12). The club also came 2nd place in the 1984 Anglo-Italian Cup

== History ==
The first recorded football match in Teramo took place on 15 July 1913. On 25 August 1929 l'Associazione Sportiva Teramo was founded originally playing in red and yellow kits, however in the following year the club was bankrupt and was taken over by the Sportiva Società Ginnastica Gran Sasso Teramo which gave the team their famous red and white kits. In 1935, the team goes bankrupt once again and in 1936 l'Associazione Polisportiva Interamnia was formed and football was once again played.

After several seasons in Serie C1, Teramo had a difficult 2006–07 campaign, finishing in 15th place, a position that forced them to play in the relegation playoffs. The club lost by a two-goal margin, 4–2 on aggregate to the 16th-place team, Ancona and was thus relegated to Serie C2.

In the 2007–08 campaign, the team finished 8th in Serie C2/B, but declare bankruptcy at the end of the season and was removed from the professional leagues.

The team was refounded for the 2008–09 season, and won the league of Promozione Abruzzo A, the seventh tier of Italian football. Teramo continued the movement up the Italian football pyramid the following year, winning the Eccellenza Abruzzo and obtaining promotion to Serie D. In its first season in the division Teramo lost the Lega Pro Seconda Divisione playoff to Rimini Calcio, however, earned direct promotion to the then Italian fourth division by winning the league the following year.

In its first season in Lega Pro Seconda Divisione, Teramo Calcio achieved a promotional playoff to Lega Pro Prima Divisione where it lost in a 2-game showdown against L'Aquila Calcio. In the 2013–14 season, Teramo competed once again in the Lega Pro Seconda Divisione and secured the promotion on 6 April 2014, on a home match against Arzanese.

The following season the white and reds won a historic Lega Pro division title and ascended to Serie B for the first time in their 102 years of history, however, the title was subsequently revoked and promotion was denied due to Teramo's part in the 2015 Italian football scandal.

In July 2022, Teramo was excluded from Serie C due to financial issues. The club was subsequently reformed as S.S.D. Città di Teramo and was admitted to play at the regional amateur Promozione level.

== Colours and badge ==
Teramo's home kit is a white shirt with vertical red stripes and red shorts.

The official mascot of the club is a devil nicknamed "Sajettino" which means chili pepper.

Badge used from 2019

== Notable players ==
The following notable players had international caps for their respective countries. Players whose name is listed in bold represented their countries while playing for S.S. Teramo.

- (Senegal) Lys Gomis
- (Slovakia) Richard Lásik
- (Honduras) Julio de León
- (Romania) Vasile Mogoș
- (Albania) Florian Myrtaj
- (Italy) Simone Pepe
- (Albania) Arjan Stafa
- (Italy) Mario Tortul
- (Nigeria) Adewale Wahab
- (Nigeria) Jero Shakpoke
- (Italy) Enrico Chiesa
- (Romania) Daniel Bîrligea
