= 1986–87 Kategoria e Dytë =

Kategoria e Dytë
- Season: 1986–87
- Champions: Besëlidhja
- Promoted: Besëlidhja; 31 Korriku
- Relegated: Shkumbini (expelled)

The 1986–87 Kategoria e Dytë was the 40th season of a second-tier association football league in Albania.

== League table ==
| Pos | Team | Pld | W | D | L | GF | GA | GD | Pts | Promotion or relegation |
|---|---|---|---|---|---|---|---|---|---|---|
| 1 | Besëlidhja (C, P) | 30 | 16 | 8 | 6 | 50 | 26 | +24 | 40 | Promotion to 1987–88 National Championship |
| 2 | 31 Korriku (P) | 30 | 16 | 8 | 6 | 46 | 22 | +24 | 40 | Promotion to 1987–88 National Championship |
| 3 | Erzeni | 30 | 14 | 8 | 8 | 34 | 34 | 0 | 36 | |
| 4 | Korabi | 30 | 10 | 14 | 6 | 27 | 20 | +7 | 34 | |
| 5 | Butrinti | 30 | 13 | 4 | 13 | 33 | 36 | −3 | 30 | |
| 6 | Studenti | 30 | 8 | 12 | 10 | 32 | 34 | −2 | 28 | |
| 7 | Ylli i Kuq | 30 | 12 | 4 | 14 | 27 | 32 | −5 | 28 | |
| 8 | 5 Shtatori | 30 | 10 | 8 | 12 | 30 | 36 | −6 | 28 | |
| 9 | Përparimi | 30 | 11 | 6 | 13 | 37 | 45 | −8 | 28 | |
| 10 | Vetëtima | 30 | 12 | 4 | 14 | 35 | 50 | −15 | 28 | |
| 11 | 24 Maji | 30 | 10 | 7 | 13 | 30 | 26 | +4 | 27 | |
| 12 | Ballshi i Ri | 30 | 10 | 7 | 13 | 33 | 33 | 0 | 27 | |
| 13 | Sopoti | 30 | 7 | 13 | 10 | 29 | 33 | −4 | 27 | |
| 14 | Minatori (T) | 30 | 8 | 11 | 11 | 23 | 30 | −7 | 27 | Qualification to the Relegation Playoff |
| 15 | Kastrioti | 30 | 10 | 6 | 14 | 27 | 30 | −3 | 26 | Qualification to the Relegation Playoff |
| 16 | Shkumbini (D) | 30 | 11 | 4 | 15 | 27 | 33 | −6 | 26 | Qualification to the Relegation Playoff |

(C) Champions; (D) Disqualified; (P) Promoted

== Championship playoff ==
Besëlidhja and 31 Korriku finished the season level on points so the Albanian Football Association decided to organise a championship playoff game to determine the winner of the 1986–87 Kategoria e Dytë.

| Team 1 | Score | Team 2 |
|---|---|---|
| Besëlidhja | 3–2 | 31 Korriku |

== Relegation/promotion playoff ==
=== Group Lezhë ===
| Team 1 | Score | Team 2 |
|---|---|---|
| Minatori (Rr) | 5–0 | Valbona |
| Kastrioti | 0–0 | Tërbuni |
| Tërbuni | 2–0 | Minatori (Rr) |
| Kastrioti | 2–0 | Valbona |
| Tërbuni | 2–0 | Valbona |
| Kastrioti | 0–0 | Minatori (Rr) |

| Pos | Team | Pld | W | D | L | GF | GA | GD | Pts | Promotion |
|---|---|---|---|---|---|---|---|---|---|---|
| 1 | Tërbuni (P) | 3 | 2 | 1 | 0 | 4 | 0 | +4 | 5 | Promotion to 1987–88 Kategoria e Dytë |
| 2 | Kastrioti | 3 | 1 | 2 | 0 | 2 | 0 | +2 | 4 | Promotion to 1987–88 Kategoria e Dytë |
| 3 | Minatori (Rr) | 3 | 1 | 1 | 1 | 5 | 2 | +3 | 3 | |
| 4 | Valbona | 3 | 0 | 0 | 3 | 0 | 9 | −9 | 0 | |

(P) Promoted

=== Group Ballsh ===
| Team 1 | Score | Team 2 |
|---|---|---|
| Minatori (T) | 1–1 | Shkumbini |
| 10 Korriku | 1–0 | Gramozi |
| Minatori (T) | 5–1 | Gramozi |
| Shkumbini | ann. | 10 Korriku |
| Shkumbini | 3–1 | Gramozi |
| 10 Korriku | 1–1 | Minatori (T) |

| Pos | Team | Pld | W | D | L | GF | GA | GD | Pts | Promotion |
|---|---|---|---|---|---|---|---|---|---|---|
| 1 | Minatori (T) | 3 | 1 | 2 | 0 | 7 | 3 | +4 | 4 | Promotion to 1987–88 Kategoria e Dytë |
| 2 | 10 Korriku (P) | 3 | 1 | 1 | 1 | 2 | 2 | 0 | 3 | Promotion to 1987–88 Kategoria e Dytë |
| 3 | Gramozi | 3 | 0 | 0 | 3 | 2 | 9 | −7 | 0 | |
| 4 | Shkumbini (D) | 3 | 2 | 1 | 0 | 5 | 2 | +3 | 5 | Disqualified (Note: Shkumbini was disqualified following disturbances in the match against 10 Korriku.) |

(D) Disqualified; (P) Promoted
