= Eduard Kaçaçi =

Albanian footballer

Personal information
- Date of birth: 9 January 1967 (age 59)
- Place of birth: Tirana, Albania
- Height: 1.84 m (6 ft 0 in)
- Position: Forward

Senior career*
Years	Team	Apps	(Gls)
1986–1991	Partizani Tirana		
1998–1999	FSG Schiffweiler	34	(23)

International career
1990	Albania	2	(0)
- * Club domestic league appearances and goals

Eduard Kaçaçi (born 9 January 1967) is an Albanian retired footballer who played as a forward for Partizani Tirana.

== International career ==
Kaçaçi made his debut for Albania in a September 1990 friendly match against Greece and earned a total of two caps, scoring no goals.

His second and final international was a November 1990 European Championship qualification match against France.

== Defection ==
Kaçaçi, alongside national team members Lorenc Leskaj and Genc Ibro, disappeared from the national team squad in March 1991 in Geneva on their way to Paris to play a European Championship qualifier against France. At the time, Albania was still ruled by the communists. The players were later reported to have sought asylum in Switzerland.

== Honours ==
- Albanian Superliga: 1987
