= Vasil Bici =

Albanian football coach

Personal information
- Date of birth: 1 January 1960 (age 66)
- Place of birth: Lezhë, PR Albania

Managerial career
- Years: Team
- 1984–1985: Besëlidhja
- 1993–1995: Besëlidhja
- 1996–1998: Shkumbini
- 1998–1999: Vllaznia
- 2000: Bylis
- 2001–2002: Besëlidhja
- 2003: Shkumbini
- 2003: Teuta
- 2003–2004: Shkumbini
- 2004–2005: Vllaznia
- 2005: Dinamo Tirana
- 2006: Dinamo Tirana
- 2006: Dinamo Tirana
- 2006: Shkumbini
- 2006–2007: Besa
- 2007–2008: Kastrioti
- 2008–2009: Lushnja

Vasil Bici (born 20 January 1954) is an Albanian football coach. He was most recently the manager of Albanian football clubs Dinamo Tirana (2005–06), Besa (2006–2007), Kastrioti (2006–2007) and Lushnja (2008–2009).
