= Genc Ibro =

Albanian footballer

Personal information
- Date of birth: 7 July 1967 (age 59)
- Place of birth: Albania
- Position: Defender

Senior career*
Years	Team	Apps	(Gls)
1985–1991	Dinamo Tirana		
1991–1995	Civitacastellana		
1995–1996	Anagni		

International career
1990	Albania	3	(0)
- * Club domestic league appearances and goals

Genc Ibro (born 7 July 1967) is an Albanian retired footballer, who played as a defender for Dinamo Tirana football club and for the Albania national team.

== International career ==
He made his debut for Albania in a September 1990 friendly match against Greece and earned a total of 3 caps, scoring no goals.

His final international was a December 1990 European Championship qualification match against Spain.

=== Defection ===
Ibro, alongside national team members Lorenc Leskaj and Eduard Kaçaçi, disappeared from the national team squad in March 1991 in Geneva on their way to Paris to play a European Championship qualifier against France. At the time, Albania was still ruled by the communists. The players were later reported to have sought asylum in Switzerland.

== Honours ==
- Albanian Superliga: 2

1986, 1990
