= 1960 Albanian National Championship =

Albanian National Championship
- Season: 1960
- Champions: Dinamo Tirana; 7th Albanian title
- Relegated: Lokomotiva Durrës
- European Cup: None
- Cup Winners' Cup: None
- Matches: 90
- Goals: 219 (2.43 per match)
- Top goalscorer: Skënder Jareci (13 goals)

The 1960 Albanian National Championship was the 23rd season of the Albanian National Championship, the top professional league for association football clubs, since its establishment in 1930.

== Overview ==
It was contested by 10 teams, and Dinamo Tirana won the championship.

== League standings ==
| Pos | Team | Pld | W | D | L | GF | GA | GR | Pts | Qualification or relegation |
|---|---|---|---|---|---|---|---|---|---|---|
| 1 | Dinamo Tirana (C) | 18 | 15 | 2 | 1 | 44 | 9 | 4.889 | 32 | Champions |
| 2 | Partizani | 18 | 12 | 4 | 2 | 41 | 12 | 3.417 | 28 | |
| 3 | 17 Nëntori | 18 | 8 | 4 | 6 | 22 | 17 | 1.294 | 20 | |
| 4 | Skënderbeu | 18 | 7 | 5 | 6 | 23 | 27 | 0.852 | 19 | |
| 5 | Besa | 18 | 6 | 6 | 6 | 18 | 19 | 0.947 | 18 | |
| 6 | Flamurtari | 18 | 5 | 6 | 7 | 18 | 17 | 1.059 | 16 | |
| 7 | Labinoti | 18 | 3 | 7 | 8 | 13 | 28 | 0.464 | 13 | |
| 8 | Tomori | 18 | 4 | 4 | 10 | 18 | 34 | 0.529 | 12 | |
| 9 | Vllaznia | 18 | 4 | 4 | 10 | 11 | 30 | 0.367 | 12 | |
| 10 | Lokomotiva Durrës (R) | 18 | 3 | 4 | 11 | 11 | 26 | 0.423 | 10 | Relegation to the 1961 Kategoria e Dytë |

Source: RSSSF.org
(C) Champions; (R) Relegated

Note: '17 Nëntori' is KF Tirana, 'Labinoti' is KS Elbasani and 'Lokomotiva Durrës' is Teuta

== Results ==
| Home \ Away | 17N | BES | DIN | FLA | LAB | LOK | PAR | SKË | TOM | VLL |
|---|---|---|---|---|---|---|---|---|---|---|
| 17 Nëntori | | 1–0 | 0–1 | 1–0 | 1–0 | 4–0 | 2–2 | 2–2 | 4–2 | 2–0 |
| Besa | 0–1 | | 1–2 | 2–1 | 1–1 | 3–1 | 0–0 | 2–1 | 3–1 | 0–0 |
| Dinamo | 2–0 | 4–0 | | 2–0 | 6–1 | 1–0 | 2–0 | 5–1 | 2–0 | 4–0 |
| Flamurtari | 2–0 | 0–1 | 1–1 | | 3–2 | 2–2 | 1–1 | 1–1 | 2–0 | 3–0 |
| Labinoti | 1–1 | 1–1 | 0–4 | 0–0 | | 2–0 | 0–1 | 1–0 | 1–1 | 1–0 |
| Lokomotiva | 1–0 | 1–1 | 0–0 | 1–0 | 1–0 | | 1–1 | 1–2 | 0–2 | 0–1 |
| Partizani | 2–1 | 1–0 | 3–1 | 1–0 | 4–0 | 1–0 | | 4–1 | 7–0 | 6–0 |
| Skënderbeu | 1–1 | 2–1 | 1–3 | 2–1 | 2–0 | 1–0 | 0–2 | | 2–1 | 3–1 |
| Tomori | 0–1 | 1–2 | 1–2 | 0–0 | 1–1 | 3–1 | 2–1 | 1–1 | | 1–0 |
| Vllaznia | 1–0 | 0–0 | 0–2 | 0–1 | 1–1 | 2–1 | 1–4 | 0–0 | 4–1 | |

Source: CalcioMondialeWeb.it
Legend: Blue = home team win; Yellow = draw; Red = away team win.
