= 1988–89 Albanian Cup =

Kupa e Shqipërisë

Tournament details
- Country: Albania

Final positions
- Champions: Dinamo Tirana
- Runners-up: Partizani

1988–89 Albanian Cup (Albanian: Kupa e Shqipërisë) was the thirty-seventh season of Albania's annual cup competition. It began in August 1988 with the First Round and ended in May 1989 with the Final match. The winners of the competition qualified for the 1989-90 first round of the UEFA Cup. Flamurtari were the defending champions, having won their second Albanian Cup last season. The cup was won by Dinamo Tirana.

The first round was played in a single round-robin matches within 4 qualifying groups. The other rounds were played in a two-legged format similar to those of European competitions. If the aggregated score was tied after both games, the team with the higher number of away goals advanced. If the number of away goals was equal in both games, the match was decided by extra time and a penalty shootout, if necessary.

== First round ==
Games were played on August & September 1988

=== Group A ===
Pos	Team	Pld	W	D	L	GF	GA	GD	Pts	Qualification
1	17 Nëntori	5	3	2	0	8	3	+5	8	Advance to quarter-finals
2	Skënderbeu	5	2	2	1	5	3	+2	6	Advance to quarter-finals
3	Ballshi i Ri	5	1	2	2	8	8	0	4	
4	Luftëtari	5	1	2	2	5	7	−2	4	
5	Labinoti	5	2	0	3	4	6	−2	4	
6	Minatori Tepelena	5	1	2	2	8	11	−3	4	

Source: Calciomondialeweb.it
Rules for classification: 1) points; 2) goal difference; 3) number of goals scored.

=== Group B ===
Pos	Team	Pld	W	D	L	GF	GA	GD	Pts	Qualification
1	Partizani	5	3	2	0	13	6	+7	8	Advance to quarter-finals
2	Vllaznia	5	2	2	1	13	9	+4	6	Advance to quarter-finals
3	Lokomotiva Durrës	5	2	2	1	6	5	+1	6	
4	Korabi	5	2	1	2	6	6	0	5	
5	Përparimi	5	2	1	2	5	8	−3	5	
6	Turbina	5	0	0	5	4	13	−9	0	

Source: Calciomondialeweb.it
Rules for classification: 1) points; 2) goal difference; 3) number of goals scored.

=== Group C ===
Pos	Team	Pld	W	D	L	GF	GA	GD	Pts	Qualification
1	Besëlidhja	5	4	0	1	13	4	+9	8	Advance to quarter-finals
2	Traktori	5	3	1	1	7	7	0	7	Advance to quarter-finals
3	24 Maji	5	3	0	2	8	7	+1	6	
4	Ylli i Kuq	5	1	2	2	3	4	−1	4	
5	Apolonia	5	1	1	3	5	8	−3	3	
6	5 Shtatori	5	0	2	3	8	14	−6	2	

Source: Calciomondialeweb.it
Rules for classification: 1) points; 2) goal difference; 3) number of goals scored.

=== Group D ===
Pos	Team	Pld	W	D	L	GF	GA	GD	Pts	Qualification
1	Dinamo Tirana	5	2	3	0	10	4	+6	7	Advance to quarter-finals
2	Tomori	5	2	3	0	4	2	+2	7	Advance to quarter-finals
3	Flamurtari	5	3	1	1	8	7	+1	7	
4	Erzeni	5	1	2	2	4	6	−2	4	
5	Besa	5	1	1	3	5	6	−1	3	
6	Kastrioti	5	1	0	4	5	11	−6	2	

Source: Calciomondialeweb.it
Rules for classification: 1) points; 2) goal difference; 3) number of goals scored.

== Quarter-finals ==
In this round entered the 8 winners from the previous round.

Team 1	Agg.	Team 2	1st leg	2nd leg
Vllaznia	2–5	Dinamo Tirana	1–1	1–4
Skënderbeu	3–5	Besëlidhja	1–0	2–5
Traktori	1–4	Partizani	1–1	0–3
17 Nëntori	1–1 (a)	Tomori	0–0	1–1

== Semi-finals ==
In this round entered the four winners from the previous round.

Team 1	Agg.	Team 2	1st leg	2nd leg
Partizani	5–0	Besëlidhja	1–0	4–0
17 Nëntori	0–1	Dinamo Tirana	0–1	0–0

== Final ==
31 May 1989
17:00

Dinamo Tirana	0–0	Partizani

Qemal Stafa Stadium, Tirana
Attendance: 20,000
Referee: Pajtim Aliko

=== Replay ===
2 June 1989
17:00

Dinamo Tirana	3–1	Partizani
Abazi 4'; Demollari 49', 90'		Shehu 43'

Qemal Stafa Stadium, Tirana
Attendance: 18,000
Referee: Besnik Kaimi
