= Bejkush Birçe =

Albanian footballer and coach (1943–2024)

Personal information
- Date of birth: 13 February 1943
- Place of birth: Vlore, Albania
- Date of death: 30 June 2024 (aged 81)

Youth career
- 1952–1954: 17 Nëntori
- 1954–1955: Flamurtari

Senior career*
Years	Team	Apps	(Gls)
–1962	Partizani		

Managerial career
- 1962–1969: Partizani Academy
- 1969–1972: Partizani
- 1972–1975: Naftëtari
- 1975–1978: Flamurtari
- 1978–1984: Partizani
- Lokomotiva Durrës
- 1987–1991: Dinamo Tirana
- 1990: Albania
- 1991–1994: Albania
- 1994–1996: Flamurtari
- * Club domestic league appearances and goals

Bejkush Birçe (13 February 1943 – 30 June 2024) was an Albanian football player and coach who coached the Albania national team. (Note: Bejkush Birçe at WorldFootball.net)

== Managerial career ==
During a 25-year career, Birçe managed Partizani Tirana, Dinamo Tirana, Flamurtari, Lokomotiva and Naftëtari as well as the Albania national team. He won two league titles with Partizani and one with Dinamo.

He also was vice-president of the Albanian FA from 1997 to 2001. Birçe died on 30 June 2024, at the age of 81.
