= Agim Canaj =

Albanian footballer and manager (born 1962)

Personal information
- Date of birth: 14 July 1962 (age 64)
- Place of birth: Vlorë, PR Albania
- Position: Defender

Team information
- Current team: Korabi (manager)

Senior career*
Years	Team	Apps	(Gls)
1985–1991	Dinamo Tirana	107	(33)
1991–1994	FC Brașov	67	(7)

International career
1991	Albania	1	(0)

Managerial career
- 2003: Dinamo Tirana
- 2003–2004: Lushnja
- 2004–2005: Shkumbini
- 2005: Dinamo Tirana
- 2005: Besa Kavajë
- 2006: Skënderbeu
- 2006: Flamurtari
- 2007–2008: Dinamo Tirana
- 2008–2009: Vllaznia
- 2009–2010: Gramozi
- 2010: Shkumbini
- 2011: Bylis Ballsh
- 2012: Bylis Ballsh
- 2013–2014: Vllaznia
- 2014: Kukësi
- 2015: Bylis Ballsh
- 2015: Tërbuni
- 2019: Vllaznia
- 2021: Korabi
- 2022: Lushnja
- 2024: Iliria
- 2024–: Korabi
- * Club domestic league appearances and goals

Agim Canaj (born 14 July 1962) is an Albanian football coach and former international player. He is the manager of Korabi.

== Club career ==
As a player, Canaj played with Dinamo Tirana as a defender in the European Cup Winners' Cup 1989–90. A soon as Albanians were free to leave the country after the end of the communist era, Canaj moved abroad to play alongside compatriot Arbën Minga in Romania for FC Brașov.

== International career ==
Canaj made his debut for Albania in a March 1991 UEFA Euro 1992 qualification match against France, which remained his only cap.

== Managerial career ==
As a manager, Canaj led Vllaznia Shkodër into the 2nd qualifying round of the UEFA Cup 2008–09, losing to S.S.C. Napoli. In the summer of 2015 he was named coach of Bylis Ballsh for the third time.

== Honours ==
- Albanian Superliga: 1986, 1990
- Albanian Cup: 2003, 2008
