= 1985–86 Albanian National Championship =

Albanian National Championship
- Season: 1985–86
- Champions: Dinamo Tirana; 14th Albanian title
- Relegated: Besëlidhja; Shkëndija Tiranë
- European Cup: Dinamo Tirana
- UEFA Cup: Flamurtari
- Cup Winners' Cup: 17 Nëntori
- Matches: 182
- Goals: 459 (2.52 per match)
- Top goalscorer: Kujtim Majaci (20 goals)

The 1985–86 Albanian National Championship was the 47th season of the Albanian National Championship, the top professional league for association football clubs, since its establishment in 1930.

== Overview ==
It was contested by 14 teams, and Dinamo Tirana won the championship.

== League table ==
Pos	Team	Pld	W	D	L	GF	GA	GD	Pts	Qualification or relegation
1	Dinamo Tirana (C)	26	16	7	3	50	20	+30	39	Qualification for the European Cup first round
2	Flamurtari	26	15	8	3	42	20	+22	38	Qualification for the UEFA Cup first round
3	17 Nëntori	26	16	5	5	57	29	+28	37	Qualification for the Cup Winners' Cup first round
4	Lokomotiva Durrës	26	9	12	5	31	22	+9	30	
5	Partizani	26	11	8	7	34	29	+5	30	
6	Vllaznia	26	11	7	8	42	29	+13	29	
7	Apolonia	26	9	8	9	35	40	−5	26	
8	Luftëtari	26	7	8	11	22	34	−12	22	
9	Traktori	26	7	8	11	24	43	−19	22	
10	Tomori	26	8	5	13	31	37	−6	21	
11	Labinoti	26	8	5	13	26	36	−10	21	
12	Naftëtari	26	7	6	13	32	46	−14	20	
13	Besëlidhja (R)	26	5	9	12	19	26	−7	19	Relegation to the 1986–87 Kategoria e Dytë
14	Shkëndija Tiranë (R)	26	2	6	18	16	49	−33	10	Relegation to the 1986–87 Kategoria e Dytë

Source: RSSSF.org
(C) Champions; (R) Relegated

Note: '17 Nëntori' is Tirana, 'Lokomotiva Durrës' is Teuta, 'Traktori' is Lushnja, 'Labinoti' is Elbasani

== Results ==
Home \ Away	17N	APO	BSL	DIN	FLA	LAB	LOK	LUF	NAF	PAR	SHK	TOM	TRA	VLL
17 Nëntori		6–0	0–0	3–5	0–0	3–0	3–2	3–0	5–2	1–2	2–0	1–0	4–0	3–1
Apolonia	4–1		2–1	1–3	1–0	2–1	1–1	0–0	0–0	0–2	2–1	1–1	3–1	3–1
Besëlidhja	0–1	2–0		1–2	2–3	1–0	0–0	0–0	4–3	0–0	3–0	0–0	0–0	0–1
Dinamo	0–0	1–1	0–0		1–0	2–1	1–1	3–1	2–1	1–0	2–0	3–0	7–1	2–2
Flamurtari	1–1	3–1	1–0	3–1		2–1	2–0	0–0	3–1	2–0	1–1	3–2	5–0	2–1
Labinoti	0–0	1–0	3–1	0–2	0–1		0–2	1–0	1–1	1–1	2–1	2–0	2–1	2–0
Lokomotiva	2–1	3–0	3–1	0–0	1–1	0–0		1–1	2–0	2–0	0–0	1–0	0–1	1–1
Luftëtari	0–1	2–2	0–0	0–3	1–1	1–0	1–0		2–1	1–2	2–1	5–2	2–0	2–0
Naftëtari	1–5	4–3	2–0	0–3	0–1	3–0	2–2	3–0		1–1	1–1	1–0	1–1	1–0
Partizani	3–7	3–2	2–0	0–1	0–0	4–1	1–1	2–0	2–1		1–0	2–0	1–1	2–0
Shkëndija	1–3	0–0	0–3	0–3	1–4	1–2	1–2	3–1	1–0	1–1		1–4	0–0	0–1
Tomori	0–1	1–3	1–0	2–1	1–1	3–1	0–1	1–0	2–0	2–1	4–1		1–1	2–3
Traktori	1–2	0–2	0–0	1–1	1–2	2–1	3–2	0–0	1–2	2–0	1–0	2–1		3–2
Vllaznia	4–0	1–1	2–0	1–0	2–0	2–2	1–1	4–0	4–0	1–1	4–0	1–1	2–0	

Source: CalcioMondialeWeb.it
Legend: Blue = home team win; Yellow = draw; Red = away team win.

== Season statistics ==
=== Top scorers ===
Rank	Player	Club	Goals
1	(Albania) Kujtim Majaci	Apolonia	20
2	(Albania) Arben Minga	17 Nëntori	16
3	(Albania) Roland Luçi	Vllaznia	13
3	(Albania) Eduard Abazaj	Dinamo Tirana	13
3	(Albania) Agustin Kola	17 Nëntori	13
6	(Albania) Përparim Kovaçi	Tomori	10
