= Eduard Abazi =

Albanian footballer and manager (born 1963)

Eduard Abazaj
Personal information
- Date of birth: 29 November 1963 (age 62)
- Place of birth: Tirana, Albania
- Height: 1.85 m (6 ft 1 in)
- Position: Left back

Senior career*
Years	Team	Apps	(Gls)
1985–1990	Dinamo Tirana		
1990–1993	Hajduk Split	22	(2)
1993–1994	Benfica	0	(0)
1993–1994	→ HNK Šibenik (loan)	24	(2)
1994–1995	Boavista	28	(4)
1995	Manchester City	0	(0)
1996–1999	Académica de Coimbra	79	(4)
1999–2001	C.F. Os Marialvas		

International career
1984–1997	Albania	19	(2)

Managerial career
- 2002–2003: Shkumbini
- * Club domestic league appearances and goals

Eduard Abazaj (born 29 November 1963) is an Albanian-Portuguese retired international footballer who played as a left-back. His sons Richard Abazaj (born 2003) and Romeu Abazaj are also Luso-Albanian footballers.

== Club career ==
Abazaj was born in Tirana in 1963. He made his league debut for Dinamo Tirana in 1985. He was one of the first players to move abroad after Albania's borders opened up in 1990 and he played for clubs such as Hajduk Split, S.L. Benfica, Boavista FC and Manchester City.

== National team statistics ==
Albania national team
Year	Apps	Goals
1985	1	0
1990	1	0
1991	2	1
1992	5	1
1993	2	0
1995	3	0
1996	2	0
1997	3	0
Total	19	2

== Honours ==
- Albanian Superliga: 1985–86, 1989–90
- Albanian Cup: 1989, 1990
- Croatian League: 1992
- Croatian Cup: 1992–93
- Croatian Supercup: 1992, 1993
- Portuguese Liga: 1993–94
