= 1989–90 Albanian National Championship =

Albanian National Championship
- Season: 1989–90
- Champions: Dinamo Tirana; 15th Albanian title
- Relegated: Besëlidhja
- European Cup: Dinamo
- UEFA Cup: Partizani
- Cup Winners' Cup: Flamurtari
- Matches: 198
- Goals: 446 (2.25 per match)
- Top goalscorer: Kujtim Majaci (19 goals)

The 1989–90 Albanian National Championship was the 51st season of the Albanian National Championship, the top professional league for association football clubs, since its establishment in 1930.

== League table ==
Pos	Team	Pld	W	W3	D	L3	L	GF	GA	GD	Pts	Qualification or relegation
1	Dinamo Tirana (C)	33	16	3	9	0	5	45	22	+23	50	Qualification for the European Cup first round
2	Partizani (Note: Partizani were deducted two points.)	33	16	4	8	1	4	56	25	+31	49	Qualification for the UEFA Cup first round
3	Flamurtari	33	13	2	7	0	11	39	27	+12	39	Qualification for the Cup Winners' Cup first round
4	17 Nëntori	33	11	2	8	0	12	40	34	+6	36	
5	Vllaznia	33	11	1	9	1	11	45	46	−1	33	
6	Apolonia (Note: Apolonia were deducted one point.)	33	13	0	7	2	11	42	46	−4	30	
7	Luftëtari	33	11	2	5	3	12	31	39	−8	30	
8	Besa	33	6	1	14	3	9	31	47	−16	26	
9	Tomori	33	5	1	15	3	9	26	36	−10	25	
10	Lokomotiva Durrës	33	8	0	9	0	16	33	45	−12	25	
11	Labinoti	33	11	0	5	3	14	27	41	−14	24	
12	Besëlidhja (Note: Besëlidhja were deducted three points.) (R)	33	6	1	12	1	13	31	38	−7	23	Relegation to the 1990–91 Kategoria e Dytë

Source: RSSSF.org
Rules for classification: 2 points for a win, 3 points for a win with a 3 or greater goal difference, 1 points for a draw, 0 points for a loss, -1 points for a loss with a 3 or greater goal difference.
(C) Champion; (R) Relegated
Notes:

Note: '17 Nëntori' is Tirana, 'Lokomotiva Durrës' is Teuta, 'Labinoti' is Elbasani

== Results ==
=== First and second round ===
Home \ Away	17N	APO	BES	BSL	DIN	FLA	LAB	LOK	LUF	PAR	TOM	VLL
17 Nëntori		2–0	1–0	0–1	0–1	1–1	2–0	2–0	3–0	1–0	2–1	4–1
Apolonia	2–1		2–0	2–0	1–2	0–2	2–0	4–2	0–1	1–1	2–0	5–4
Besa	0–0	0–1		3–2	0–0	1–0	3–0	3–3	1–0	2–2	1–1	2–0
Besëlidhja	2–2	2–1	1–1		0–0	2–0	0–0	1–0	4–0	1–1	0–0	1–2
Dinamo	0–1	2–1	4–0	3–1		2–1	4–3	1–0	1–0	2–2	1–0	1–2
Flamurtari	2–0	0–0	0–0	2–1	2–1		1–2	0–1	0–0	1–0	3–0	2–0
Labinoti	3–1	0–1	1–0	1–0	0–0	1–0		1–0	1–0	1–2	1–0	1–1
Lokomotiva	2–1	1–2	2–1	2–1	0–0	0–1	1–0		1–0	1–1	1–1	0–0
Luftëtari	0–0	1–1	1–0	3–0	1–0	1–0	1–0	2–1		0–2	3–0	3–2
Partizani	2–0	3–0	6–0	0–0	1–2	2–1	4–0	4–2	3–1		2–1	1–0
Tomori	1–1	2–2	1–1	1–0	1–1	0–0	0–0	1–0	1–1	4–0		1–1
Vllaznia	0–1	0–0	4–0	2–2	0–1	2–1	2–1	1–1	1–0	2–1	2–0	

Source: CalcioMondialeWeb.it
Legend: Blue = home team win; Yellow = draw; Red = away team win.

=== Third round ===
Home \ Away	17N	APO	BES	BSL	DIN	FLA	LAB	LOK	LUF	PAR	TOM	VLL
17 Nëntori		1–2				1–1	2–1	1–2	4–2			2–0
Apolonia						1–2	2–1	0–2	2–0		1–1	1–1
Besa	2–2	4–3		1–1	0–0					0–0		
Besëlidhja	2–1	2–0			0–0	0–1				0–1		
Dinamo	2–0	2–0				1–0			3–0			2–1
Flamurtari			1–0				3–0	3–2	3–1		2–2	3–1
Labinoti			1–2	1–0	0–1					1–1	2–1	
Lokomotiva			2–2	2–2	2–2		0–1				0–1	
Luftëtari			2–0	0–0			1–0	2–0			1–0	
Partizani	1–0	4–0			2–0	1–0		2–0	2–1			1–0
Tomori	0–0		2–0	1–0	0–3					0–1		
Vllaznia			1–1	4–2			3–2	1–0	3–2		1–1	

Source: CalcioMondialeWeb.it
Legend: Blue = home team win; Yellow = draw; Red = away team win.

== Season statistics ==
=== Top scorers ===
Rank	Player	Club	Goals
1	(Albania) Kujtim Majaci	Apolonia	19
2	(Albania) Sokol Kushta	Flamurtari	15
3	(Albania) Eduard Abazi	Dinamo Tirana	14
3	(Albania) Sulejman Demollari	Dinamo Tirana	14
5	(Albania) Albert Stroni	Dinamo Tirana	11
