= FC Dinamo City =

Albanian football club

Dinamo City
- Full name: Football Club Dinamo City
- Nicknames: Dinamovitët; Blutë; Nëndetësja Blu
- Founded: 3 March 1950; 76 years ago
- Ground: Selman Stërmasi Stadium
- Capacity: 7,308
- President: Ardian Bardhi
- Manager: Ilir Daja
- League: Kategoria Superiore
- 2025–26: Kategoria Superiore, 4th
- Website: fcdinamocity.al
| Home colours | Away colours | Third colours |

Football Club Dinamo City, commonly referred to as Dinamo City and colloquially known as Dinamo, is an Albanian professional football club based in Durrës, moving from Tirana. They compete in the Kategoria Superiore, the top tier of Albanian football. Founded in 1950, the club was historically affiliated to the Interior Ministry and having won 18 National Championships, it is considered to be the second most decorated club after local rivals KF Tirana.

== History ==
The club was officially founded on 3 March 1950 by the Interior Ministry of Albania during the communist regime under dictator Enver Hoxha. They won four consecutive championships from 1950 to 1953. During this time, Dinamo recorded a hot streak of 25 consecutive wins, a record in Albanian football and 4th longest domestic winning streak in Europe.

In 1967, Dinamo won its ninth championship by leaving Tirana, then 17 Nëntori, one point behind, who was expelled for the tournament three weeks before the end. This championship is not officially recognised by UEFA, however.

In 1989, Dinamo eventually finished third in the league which was won by 17 Nëntori, which made eligible to play in European Cup Winners' Cup for the third time in their history. In the preliminary round of the tournament the team faced Chernomorets Burgas, losing the first leg 1–3 (Demollari scoring the lone goal for Dinamo City) but winning the second 4–0 at home, thus recording its biggest win in a UEFA club competition. The team then was eliminated in the first round by Dinamo București despite winning the first leg in Tirana 1–0 because Dinamo București won the second leg 2–0.

In 1995, the team were renamed KS Olimpik Tirana to leave behind the "communist past", but the club returned to their original name two years later.

Original logo

After finishing third in the table in 2005–06 season, Dinamo City named Faruk Sejdini as their new coach. One of Albania's best teachers of footballing fundamentals, he had a spell at the club last term before being dismissed by president Besnik Sulaj. Having returned following a spell at Shkumbini, Sejdini said: "It's nice to be back." On 23 October 2006, he was fired.

At the start of the 2007–08 season, Agim Canaj took over as head coach, replacing Ilir Daja who led Dinamo towards the championship title, after a dramatic win against Partizani 2–1 in the final match, playing for 36 minutes with 9 players. In the summer of 2008, Ilir Daja moved into a position as director in order to make place for Marcelo Javier Zuleta from Argentina. The Argentinian coach also brought with him four Argentinian players; goalkeeper Daniel Bertoya, defender Alejandro Palladino, midfielder Agustín González, and striker Cristian Campozano. Zuleta only lasted for the first Champions League qualification match against Bosnians FK Modriča before he was replaced as coach by Artan Mërgjyshi, for only one match.

Together with Zuleta, the four Argentinian players also left the club. After Mërgjyshi left, Zlatko Dalić, the current head coach of Croatia, was appointed as new coach for Dinamo. He signed a two-year contract with the club. That deal was broken when Dinamo lost its second game in the re-beginning of the 2008–09 season against Partizani. Shkëlqim Muça was then appointed manager of the club five days after of Zlatko Dalić's leave. In the 2009–10 season, Dinamo won the championship again, registering its 18th success.

In 2011–12 season, the club experienced its worst period of all time, finishing last in the league with 13 points from 26 matches, winning only 3 times. They were relegated to the Kategoria e Parë for the first time in their history. Since the 2012–13 season, the club have played in the Kategoria e Parë and have risked relegation to the third tier several times. After spending nine seasons in the Second Division, Dinamo clinched the promotion to the Superiore, confirming first place in Group A following a 2–0 win against FK Vora.

On 25 August 2023, it was officially announced by President Bardhi that the club would rebrand to Dinamo City, ahead of the 2023–24 Kategoria Superiore season, thanks to a project to be part of the network of Manchester City.

== Stadium ==
Dinamo City has historically played at Selman Stërmasi Stadium which was also known as Dinamo Stadium when it first opened. After a spell playing at Niko Dovana Stadium, Durrës, Dinamo rebranded in 2023 and now play at the Elbasan Arena in Elbasan.

== Supporters ==
The "Blue Boys" are an Ultras group for the Albanian football team, Dinamo City. The group were formed in 2008 and have gained 5,000 followers as of 2021. They organise meetings and trips to matches in Tirana and also away matches in Albania and even abroad. They promote Dinamo City to the local public and influence fans of the club in a number of ways.

== Divisional movements ==
| Series | Years | Last | Promotions | Relegations |
|---|---|---|---|---|
| Kategoria Superiore | 66 | 2025–26 | | ▼2 (2011–2012, 2021–22) |
| Kategoria e Parë | 10 | 2022–23 | ▲2 (2020–21, 2022–23) | ▼0 |

== Honours ==
=== Domestic ===
Dinamo are the second most successful and decorated club in Albania, having won (18) league titles Kategoria Superiore. The club also holds the win Albanian Cups (15) and Albanian Supercups (3). The club's most recent trophy was the 2025 Albanian Supercup won on 28 December 2025.

| Type | Competition | Titles | Seasons |
|---|---|---|---|
| Domestic | Kategoria Superiore | 18 | 1950, 1951, 1952, 1953, 1955, 1956, 1960, 1966–67, 1972–73, 1974–75, 1975–76, 1976–77, 1979–80, 1985–86, 1989–90, 2001–02, 2007–08, 2009–10 |
| Domestic | Albanian Cup | 15 | 1950, 1951, 1952, 1953, 1954, 1960, 1970–71, 1973–74, 1977–78, 1981–82, 1988–89, 1989–90, 2002–03, 2024–25, 2025–26 |
| Domestic | Albanian Supercup | 3 | 1989, 2008, 2025 |
| Domestic | Double | 6 | 1950, 1951, 1952, 1953, 1960, 1989–90 |

Internationally, they lost a final in the Balkan Cup in 1969 against Beroe Stara Zagora. They won the first leg in Tirana 1–0 with a goal by Bahri Ishka, but in the return match they lost 3–0 by forfeit because during the regime of Enver Hoxha, travel wasn't allowed to Bulgaria.

== FC Dinamo City in Europe ==
Dinamo City have given good performances in Europe among Albanian squads, winning 8 ties in Europe.

Submarine blues In their European path, Dinamo have played against "big guns" such as: Ajax, Austria Wien, etc. Drawn against teams such as Sporting Lisbona, Beşiktaş, Dinamo București, Olympique Marseille, Brøndby, CSKA Sofia, Sheriff Tiraspol, CZ Jena, Aberdeen, Hajduk Split, etc. Dinamo has passed 8 rounds in the European cups, defeating opponents like Ħamrun Spartans, Chernomorets Burgas, Kaunas, Atlètic Club d'Escaldes ,Hajduk Split ,FC Astana ,Aluminij and Auda.

The evening of August 14, 2025 is historic for Dinamo as for the first time after almost 15 years of absence from European cups, they reached the play-off stage of the UEFA Conference League where they defeated HNK Hajduk Split 3-1 with goals from Zabërgja and Qardaku and Hekuran Berisha.

Dinamo made history by winning away against Astana 4-1, the deepest victory for the blue team on away matches, while on July 30 they again advanced to the second round, defeating 3-0 Aluminij with goals from Vila, Kefalia and Përndreca.

| Season | Competition | Round | Country | Club | Home | Away | Aggregate |
| 1961–63 | Balkans Cup | Group B | (Romania) | Dinamo București | 1–1 | 3–2 | **2nd** |
| 1961–63 | Balkans Cup | Group B | (Bulgaria) | Levski Sofia | 0–0 | 2–2 | **2nd** |
| 1961–63 | Balkans Cup | Group B | (Turkey) | Fenerbahçe | 3–2 | 0–1 | **2nd** |
| 1963–64 | Balkans Cup | Group A | (Turkey) | Beşiktaş | 2–0 | 0–1 | **3rd** |
| 1963–64 | Balkans Cup | Group A | (Romania) | Rapid București | 1–1 | 1–2 | **3rd** |
| 1963–64 | Balkans Cup | Group A | (Bulgaria) | Levski Sofia | 1–1 | 1–1 | **3rd** |
| 1967–68 | European Cup | 1R | (West Germany) | Eintracht Braunschweig | (w/o) | (w/o) | **(w/o)** |
| 1969 | Balkans Cup | Group A | (Romania) | Universitatea Craiova | 2–0 | 1–3 | **1st** |
| 1969 | Balkans Cup | Group A | (Socialist Federal Republic of Yugoslavia) | Bor | 4–1 | 2–2 | **1st** |
| 1969 | Balkans Cup | Final | (Bulgaria) | Beroe Stara Zagora | 1–0 | 0–3 | **1–3** |
| 1971–72 | European Cup Winners' Cup | 1R | (Austria) | Austria Wien | 1–1 | 0–1 | **1–2** |
| 1976 | Balkans Cup | Group B | (Socialist Federal Republic of Yugoslavia) | Dinamo Zagreb | 1–2 | 1–2 | **2nd** |
| 1976 | Balkans Cup | Group B | (Greece) | Ethnikos Piraeus | 2–0 | 3–4 | **2nd** |
| 1980–81 | European Cup | 1R | (Netherlands) | Ajax | 0–2 | 0–1 | **0–3** |
| 1981–82 | UEFA Cup | 1R | (East Germany) | Carl Zeiss Jena | 1–0 | 0–4 | **1–4** |
| 1982–83 | European Cup Winners' Cup | 1R | (Scotland) | Aberdeen | 0–0 | 0–1 | **0–1** |
| 1985–86 | UEFA Cup | 1R | (Malta) | Ħamrun Spartans | 1–0 | 0–0 | **1–0** |
| 1985–86 | UEFA Cup | 2R | (Portugal) | Sporting CP | 0–0 | 0–1 | **0–1** |
| 1986–87 | European Cup | 1R | (Turkey) | Beşiktaş | 0–1 | 0–2 | **0–3** |
| 1987–88 | Balkans Cup | Group B | (Turkey) | Eskişehirspor | 3–1 | 0–4 | **3rd** |
| 1987–88 | Balkans Cup | Group B | (Romania) | Corvinul Hunedoara | 1–1 | 0–2 | **3rd** |
| 1989–90 | European Cup Winners' Cup | QR | (Bulgaria) | Chernomorets Burgas | 4–0 | 1–3 | **5–3** |
| 1989–90 | European Cup Winners' Cup | 1R | (Romania) | Dinamo București | 1–0 | 0–2 | **1–2** |
| 1990–91 | European Cup | 1R | (France) | Marseille | 0–0 | 1–5 | **1–5** |
| 2001–02 | UEFA Cup | 1QR | (Romania) | Dinamo București | 1–3 | 0–1 | 1–4 |
| 2002–03 | UEFA Champions League | 1QR | (Lithuania) | FBK Kaunas | 0–0 | 3–2 | **3–2** |
| 2002–03 | UEFA Champions League | 2QR | (Denmark) | Brøndby IF | 0–4 | 0–1 | **0–5** |
| 2003–04 | UEFA Cup | QR | (Belgium) | Lokeren | 0–4 | 1–3 | **1–7** |
| 2004–05 | UEFA Cup | 1QR | (Romania) | Oțelul Galați | 1–4 | 0–4 | **1–8** |
| 2005 | UEFA Intertoto Cup | 1R | (Croatia) | Varteks | 2–1 | 1–4 | **3–5** |
| 2006–07 | UEFA Cup | 1QR | (Bulgaria) | CSKA Sofia | 0–1 | 1–4 | **1–5** |
| 2008–09 | UEFA Champions League | 1QR | (Bosnia and Herzegovina) | Modriča | 0–2 | 1–2 | **1–4** |
| 2009–10 | UEFA Europa League | 1QR | (Finland) | Lahti | 2–0 | 1–4 | **3–4** |
| 2010–11 | UEFA Champions League | 2QR | (Moldova) | Sheriff Tiraspol | 1–0 | 1–3 | **2–3** |
| 2025–26 | UEFA Conference League | 2QR | (Andorra) | Atlètic Club d'Escaldes | 1–1 | 2–1 | **3–2** |
| 2025–26 | UEFA Conference League | 3QR | (Croatia) | Hajduk Split | 3–1 (a.e.t.) | 1–2 | **4–3** |
| 2025–26 | UEFA Conference League | PO | (Poland) | Jagiellonia Białystok | 1–1 | 0–3 | **1–4** |
| 2026–27 | UEFA Conference League | 1QR | (Kazakhstan) | Astana | 0–1 | 4–1 (a.e.t.) | **4–2** |
| 2026–27 | UEFA Conference League | 2QR | (Slovenia) | Aluminij | 3–0 | 1–1 | **4–1** |
| 2026–27 | UEFA Conference League | 3QR | (Latvia) | Auda | 4–0 | 0–1 | **4–1** |
| 2026–27 | UEFA Conference League | PO | (Cyprus) | Pafos | 1–1 | 2–4 (a.e.t.) | **3–5** |

- QR = Qualifying Round
- 1QR = 1st Round
- 2QR = 2nd Round
- 3QR = 3rd Round
- PO = Play-Off
- Clubs which ultimately won the tournament in that same season are indicated in **bold**

=== Europe ===
- Biggest ever European home victory: Dinamo 4–0 (Bulgaria) PFC Chernomorets Burgas (30 August 1989)
  **Dinamo 4–0** (Latvia) FK Auda (13 August 2026)
- Biggest ever European home defeat: Dinamo 0–4 (Denmark) Brøndby IF (7 August 2002)
  Dinamo 0–4 (Belgium) KSC Lokeren (14 August 2003)
- Biggest ever European away victory: (Kazakhstan) FC Astana 1–4 Dinamo (16 July 2026)
- Biggest ever European away defeat: (France) Olympique Marseille 5–1 Dinamo (19 September 1990)
- Most European appearances: (Albania) Arjan Pisha (24)
- Most European goals: (Albania) Sulejman Demollari (6)

=== UEFA club coefficient ranking ===
| Rank | Team | Points |
|---|---|---|
| 271 | (Luxembourg) Progrès Niederkorn | 3.000 |
| 272 | (Iceland) Valur | 3.000 |
| **273** | (Albania) **FC Dinamo City** | **2.500** |
| 274 | (Norway) Fredikstad | 2.500 |
| 275 | (Turkey) Adana Demirspor | 2.500 |

=== Record transfers ===
| Rank | Player | To | Fee | Year |
|---|---|---|---|---|
| 1. | (Albania) Eduard Abazaj | (Croatia) Hajduk Split | €1.00m | 1990 |
| 2. | (Kosovo) Baton Zabërgja | (Ukraine) Metalist 1925 | €800k | 2025 |
| 3. | (Nigeria) Peter Itodo | (Ukraine) Metalist 1925 | €700k | 2025 |
| 4. | (Albania) Simon Simoni | (Germany) Eintracht Frankfurt | €600k | 2022 |
| 5. | (Albania) Elis Bakaj | (Romania) Dinamo București | €250k | 2010 |
| 5. | (Albania) Jahmir Hyka | (Norway) Rosenborg | €250k | 2005 |

=== Last Season of Dinamo in Kategoria Superiore ===
| Season | Division | Pos. | Pl. | W | D | L | GS | GA | P | Cup | Supercup | Europe | | Top scorer |
|---|---|---|---|---|---|---|---|---|---|---|---|---|---|---|
| 2000–01 | Kampionati Shqiptar | 3rd | 26 | 15 | 7 | 4 | 43 | 21 | 52 | SR | — | — | — | (Albania) Ilir Qorri 15 |
| 2001–02 | Kampionati Shqiptar | 1st | 26 | 19 | 6 | 1 | 55 | 15 | 63 | RU | — | UC | **1QR** | (Albania) Daniel Xhafaj 10 (Albania) Klodian Asllani 10 |
| 2002–03 | Kampionati Shqiptar | 6th | 26 | 10 | 8 | 8 | 29 | 24 | 39 | W | **RU** | UCL | **2QR** | (Zambia) January Zyambo 8 |
| 2003–04 | Kategoria Superiore | 2nd | 36 | 21 | 8 | 7 | 68 | 39 | 71 | RU | **RU** | UC | **1QR** | (Albania) Ilir Qorri 15 |
| 2004–05 | Kategoria Superiore | 3rd | 36 | 18 | 8 | 10 | 51 | 30 | 62 | SR | — | UC | **1QR** | (Zambia) January Zyambo 13 |
| 2005–06 | Kategoria Superiore | 3rd | 36 | 17 | 10 | 9 | 53 | 35 | 61 | SF | — | UIC | **1QR** | (Senegal) El Hadji Goudjabi 15 |
| 2006–07 | Kategoria Superiore | 5th | 33 | 14 | 5 | 14 | 41 | 39 | 57 | QF | — | UC | **1QR** | (Croatia) Pero Pejić 9 |
| 2007–08 | Kategoria Superiore | 1st | 33 | 21 | 7 | 5 | 56 | 14 | 70 | SF | — | — | — | (Croatia) Pero Pejić 18 |
| 2008–09 | Kategoria Superiore | 3rd | 33 | 14 | 10 | 9 | 48 | 34 | 52 | QF | **W** | UCL | **1QR** | (Albania) Sebino Plaku 17 |
| 2009–10 | Kategoria Superiore | 1st | 33 | 19 | 4 | 10 | 56 | 41 | 61 | THR | — | UEL | **1QR** | (Albania) Elis Bakaj 16 |
| 2010–11 | Kategoria Superiore | 10th | 33 | 10 | 9 | 14 | 46 | 50 | 39 | RU | **RU** | UCL | **2QR** | (Albania) Emiljano Vila 13 |
| 2011–12 | Kategoria Superiore | ↓14th | 33 | 3 | 7 | 16 | 25 | 47 | 13 | SR | — | — | — | (Albania) Bekim Kuli 6 |
| 2021–22 | Kategoria Superiore | ↓9th | 36 | 6 | 11 | 19 | 21 | 46 | 29 | QF | — | — | — | (North Macedonia) Agim Ibraimi 8 |
| 2023–24 | Kategoria Superiore | 7th | 36 | 13 | 8 | 15 | 42 | 43 | 47 | QF | — | — | — | (Albania) Luis Kaçorri 9 |
| 2024–25 | Kategoria Superiore | 4th | 38 | 14 | 13 | 11 | 51 | 45 | 55 | W | — | — | — | (Nigeria) Peter Itodo 13 |
| 2025–26 | Kategoria Superiore | 4th | 39 | 13 | 13 | 13 | 45 | 38 | 52 | W | **W** | UECL | PO | (Albania) Dejvi Bregu 10 |
| 2026–27 | Kategoria Superiore | | | | | | | | | | | UECL | PO | |

== Players ==
=== Current squad ===
As of 1 September 2026

Note: Flags indicate national team as defined under FIFA eligibility rules; some limited exceptions apply. Players may hold more than one non-FIFA nationality.

| No. | Pos. | Nation | Player |
|---|---|---|---|
| 1 | GK | ALB | Edmir Sali |
| 2 | DF | ALB | Ysni Ismaili |
| 3 | MF | ALB | Skënder Meta |
| 5 | DF | ALB | Erion Hoxhallari |
| 6 | MF | NGR | Adamu Alhassan |
| 7 | FW | KOS | Almir Ajzeraj |
| 8 | MF | ALB | Eridon Qardaku |
| 10 | MF | ALB | Lorenco Vila |
| 11 | FW | ITA | Ruben Silva-Richards |
| 14 | DF | KOS | Bekim Maliqi |
| 16 | MF | ALB | Noel Bleta |
| 17 | DF | SEN | Saliou Sembène |
| 18 | FW | ALB | Dejvi Metaj |
| 19 | FW | NGR | Ibrahim Mustapha |
| 20 | MF | NGR | Malomo Ayodeji |

| No. | Pos. | Nation | Player |
|---|---|---|---|
| 21 | MF | ALB | Klevi Qefalija |
| 22 | MF | ALB | Bruno Dita (captain) |
| 24 | FW | ALB | Florenc Farruku |
| 27 | DF | ALB | Naser Aliji |
| 28 | MF | ALB | Isi Manellari |
| 29 | FW | KOS | Hekuran Berisha |
| 30 | MF | ALB | Rigers Rama |
| 44 | DF | NGR | Jonathan Ochiche |
| 45 | FW | NGR | Bright James |
| 47 | MF | BRA | Lorran Quintanilha |
| 77 | GK | ALB | Aldo Teqja |
| 88 | MF | ALB | Flamur Ruçi |
| 93 | DF | KOS | Faton Neziri |
| 97 | GK | ALB | Tomas Kiri |
| 99 | FW | ALB | Oresti Rifa |

=== Out on loan ===
Note: Flags indicate national team as defined under FIFA eligibility rules; some limited exceptions apply. Players may hold more than one non-FIFA nationality.

| No. | Pos. | Nation | Player |
|---|---|---|---|
| — | DF | ALB | Ardit Manjani (on loan at Besa) |

== Current staff ==
| Position | Name |
|---|---|
| Head coach | (Albania) Ilir Daja |
| Assistant coach | (Albania) Renaldo Kalari |
| Goalkeeping coach | (Albania) Ilir Bozhiqi |
| Goalkeeping coach | (Albania) Blendi Baholli |
| Fitness coach | (Italy) Korrado Sacone |
| Team manager | (Albania) Ergi Kasmi |
| Physio | (Albania) Mirban Gorenca |
| Physio | (Albania) Ramiz Reçi |
| President | (Albania) Adrian Bardhi |
| General director | (Albania) Ermal Barushi |
| Sports director | (Albania) Luan Pinari |

=== Top scorers (Golden Boot) ===
| Season | Player | Goals |
|---|---|---|
| 1955 | (Albania) Skënder Jareci | 23 |
| 1958 | (Albania) Skënder Jareci | 14 |
| 1960 | (Albania) Skënder Jareci | 16 |
| 1970–71 | (Albania) Ilir Përnaska | 19 |
| 1971–72 | (Albania) Ilir Përnaska | 17 |
| 1972–73 | (Albania) Ilir Përnaska | 12 |
| 1973–74 | (Albania) Ilir Përnaska | 19 |
| 1974–75 | (Albania) Ilir Përnaska | 17 |
| 1975–76 | (Albania) Ilir Përnaska | 18 |

== List of managers ==
- (Albania) Zihni Gjinali (1949–1956)
- (Albania) Zyber Konçi (1959–1961)
- (Albania) Xhevdet Shaqiri (1960s)
- (Albania) Skënder Jareci (1966–1973)
- (Albania) Sabri Peqini (1974–1975)
- (Albania) Durim Shehu (1975–1977)
- (Albania) Saimir Dauti (1977–1980)
- (Albania) Stavri Lubonja (1979–1981)
- (Albania) Fatmir Frashëri (1985–1986)
- (Albania) Bejkush Birçe (1987–1991)
- (Albania) Neptun Bajko (1991)
- (Albania) Faruk Sejdini (1992–1993)
- (Albania) Vasillaq Zëri (1994)
- (Albania) Faruk Sejdini (1994–1997)
- (Albania) Gani Xhafa (1997)
- (Albania) Faruk Sejdini (1998–1999)
- (Albania) Bujar Kasmi (1999–2000)
- (Albania) Shpëtim Duro (2000)
- (Albania) Faruk Sejdini (2000–2001)
- (Albania) Astrit Hafizi (2001)
- (Albania) Faruk Sejdini (Sep 2001 – Aug 2002)
- (Romania) Aurel Țicleanu (2002–03)
- (Albania) Agim Canaj (May 2003 – Jun 2003)
- (Albania) Andrea Marko (Aug 2003 – Oct 2003)
- (Albania) Sulejman Demollari (4 Oct 2003 – 20 Feb 2004)
- (Albania) Vasil Bici (15 Mar 2004 – Jul 2004)
- (Albania) Faruk Sejdini (Jul 2004 – 25 Sep 2004)
- (Argentina) Pedro Pasculli (25 Sep 2004 – 30 Oct 2004)
- (Albania) Faruk Sejdini (30 Oct 2004 – 15 Jan 2005)
- (Argentina) Pedro Pasculli (15 Jan 2005 – 27 Feb 2005)
- (Albania) Agim Canaj (27 Feb 2005 – Jun 2005)
- (Argentina) Ramón Cabrero (Jul 2005)
- (Croatia) Luka Bonačić (Jul 2005 – 29 Aug 2005)
- (Albania) Vasil Bici (29 Aug 2005 – 15 Nov 2005)
- (Croatia) Ivan Katalinić (15 Nov 2005 – 15 Feb 2006)
- (Albania) Vasil Bici (15 Feb 2006 – 15 Mar 2006)
- (Albania) Sulejman Demollari (15 Mar 2006 – 25 Mar 2006)
- (Albania) Vasil Bici (25 Mar 2006 – Jun 2006)
- (Albania) Faruk Sejdini (Jul 2006 – 25 Oct 2006)
- (Albania) Redi Jupi (25 Oct 2006 – Jun 2007)
- (Albania) Agim Canaj (Jul 2007 – 24 Feb 2008)
- (Albania) Ilir Daja (24 Feb 2008 – Jun 2008)
- (Argentina) Marcelo Javier Zuleta (July 2008)
- (Croatia) Zlatko Dalić (July 2008 – 6 Feb 2009)
- (Albania) Shkëlqim Muça (06 Feb 2009 – May 2010)
- (Argentina) Luis Manuel Blanco (July 2010 – 31 Dec 2010)
- (Albania) Ilir Daja (1 Jan 2011 – 7 Feb 2011)
- (Albania) Artan Mërgjyshi (7 Feb 2011 – Jun 2011)
- (Albania) Faruk Sejdini (Jul 2011 – 19 Nov 2011)
- (Albania) Artan Mërgjyshi (19 Nov 2011 – Jun 2012)
- (Albania) Eduard Zhupa (Jun 2012 - Oct 2012)
- (Albania) Dritan Mehmeti (Oct 2012 - Jan 2013)
- (Albania) Edmond Dalipi (Jan 2013 –May 2013)
- (Albania) Dritan Mehmeti (Jul 2013 - Mar 2015)
- (Albania) Igli Allmuça (Jun 2015 - Oct 2019)
- (Italy) Mauro Manzoni (Oct 2019 - Nov 2019)
- (Italy) Fabrizio Cammarata (Nov 2019– Dec 2020)
- (Italy) Francesco Moriero (Jan 2021– Mar 2021 )
- (Albania) Olsi Uku (Mar 2021– May 2021 )
- (Albania) Bledi Shkëmbi (Jun 2021– Feb 2022)
- (Albania) Bledar Devolli (Feb 2022– Mar 2022)
- (Italy) Rodolfo Vanoli (Mar 2022– Apr 2022)
- (Albania) Nevil Dede (Jun 2022– Feb 2023)
- (Albania) Dritan Mehmeti (Feb 2023– Jul 2023)
- (Italy) Luigi di Biagio (Aug 2023– Oct 2023)
- (Albania) Dritan Mehmeti (Oct 2023– Aug 2024)
- (Albania) Erjon Xhafa (Aug 2024– Sep 2024)
- (Albania) Ilir Daja (Sep 2024– )

=== Managerial records ===
| Name | Kategoria Superiore | Albanian Cup | Supercup | Total |
|---|---|---|---|---|
| (Albania) Zihni Gjinali | 6 | 5 | — | 11 |
| (Albania) Bejkush Birçe | 1 | 2 | 1 | 4 |
| (Albania) Ilir Daja | 1 | 2 | 1 | 4 |
| (Albania) Skënder Jareci | 2 | — | — | 2 |
| (Albania) Durim Shehu | 2 | — | — | 2 |
| (Albania) Shkëlqim Muça | 1 | — | — | 1 |
| (Albania) Stavri Lubonja | 1 | — | — | 1 |
| (Albania) Fatmir Frashëri | 1 | — | — | 1 |
| (Albania) Faruk Sejdini | 1 | — | — | 1 |
| (Albania) Sabri Peqini | 1 | — | — | 1 |
| (Albania) Zyber Konçi | 1 | — | — | 1 |
| (Albania) Agim Canaj | – | 1 | — | 1 |
| (Croatia) Zlatko Dalić | – | — | 1 | 1 |
