= Leonidha Çuri =

Albanian footballer and manager

Personal information
- Date of birth: 7 May 1951 (age 75)
- Place of birth: Vlorë, Albania
- Height: 1.73 m (5 ft 8 in)
- Position: Leftback

Youth career
- 1968–1970: Shkëndija

Senior career*
Years	Team	Apps	(Gls)
1970–1976	Shkëndija		
1977–1981	Flamurtari		

Managerial career
- 1983–1988: Flamurtari
- 1988–1990: Traktori
- 1990: Albania (assistant)
- 1992–1993: Levadiakos (assistant)
- 1996–1997: Flamurtari
- 2001–2002: Greece (futsal)
- 2003: Flamurtari
- 2006–2007: Albania (futsal)
- * Club domestic league appearances and goals

Leonidha Çuri (born May 7, 1951) is a former Albanian footballer and manager. He played for KS Flamurtari Vlorë from 1975 to 1981 as a left back and managed the club.

As a player, he started every game at left back in his six-year tenure at Flamurtari Vlorë and also appeared 7 times for the Albania National Football Team. However, he achieved most of is fame at the coaching level. He has the most successful international coaching career in Albania.

== Early beginnings and playing career ==
Leonidha Çuri was born in Vlore, Albania, in 1951. He started playing soccer out on the beach with his friends every day. At the age of 16 he went to the Institute of Soccer Excellence in Tirana. At the age of 19 he became a football player with the newly formed KiF Shkëndija in Tirana. He played with Kif Shkendija for 6 years. In 1977, at the age of 26, Leonidha signed with Flamurtari Vlorë, where he would play alongside Edmond Liçaj, Kreshnik Çipi, Petro Ruçi and Vasil Ruci as well as his brother Spiro Çuri for two years. Before he came Flamurtari finished 10th in the Albanian Superliga. When he came they finished 5th. In 47 years of Flamurtari Vlore football, they finished 11 times in the top five without Leonidha. When Leonidha was with Flamurtari they finished 3 times in the top 5 in Leonidha's four-year tenure at Flamurtari. In 1981 Leonidha Çuri retired from football at the age of thirty.

== Managerial career ==
=== Flamurtari ===
Two years after retiring from football, in 1983 Leonidha became manager of KS Flamurtari. In his first year with Flamurtari as a manager, Flamurtari finished 4th in the 1983–1984 Albanian Superliga, but finished runner-up in the Albanian Cup losing to 17 Nëntori Tirana 2–1. In the 1984–1985 season, Leonidha Çuri led Flamurtari to their first piece of silverware. Even though Flamurtari finished 5th in the Albanian Superliga, they won 1985 Albanian cup beating Partizani Tiranë 2–1. In the 1985–1986 season for Flamurtari they finished 2nd in the Superliga tied with Dinamo Tirana with 38 points losing only to goal difference. Leonidha led Flamurtari to the 1985–86 European Cup Winners' Cup. They faced HJK Helsinki but lost 5–3 in aggregates. In the 1986–1987 season Flamurtari finished 2nd behind Partizan Tiranë, but that wasn't the story of Flamurtari's season. They had qualified for the Uefa Cup that year. They were drawn to verse FC Barcelona. Flamurtari was eliminated after two draws (1–1 in Vlorë, 0–0 in Barcelona) thanks to the away goal rule. Flamurtari showed their strength by drawing the first match in Barcelona and taking the lead in the 26th minute in Vlorë, but FC Barcelona scored a late away goal to deny them of glory. Leonidha Çuri's formation was dominant even though he couldn't score a goal in Barcelona. He used a 4-4-2 formation but when Barcelona had the ball they would always have eight players back, always ready to counterattack. In Flamurtari's 1987–1988 season they finished 2nd in the Superliga. In the first round they had to play against Partizan Belgrade. After a 2–0 win in Vlorë, a result of a great Rrapo Taho goal and an own goal, Flamurtari were playing at Narodna Armija Stadium on September 30, 1987. Partizan were leading 2–0 until the 76th minute when Sokol Kushta scored an absolute beauty to take Flamurtari into the next round. In the second round Flamurtari were drawn against Wismut Aue. In the first game in Aue, Flamurtari lost 0-1 being denied many times by keeper Jörg Weißflog, however in the second leg there was nothing to do for Aue as Flamurtari defeated them 2–0. In the third round Flamurtari were drawn once again against FC Barcelona. The first leg was played at Camp Nou on 25 November. Flamurtari scored in the first half and the players went to the first half break with a score Flamurtari-Barcelona 1–0. In the second half Barcelona equalized with a controversial goal. After the equalizer Flamurtari were shocked, conceding three goals in just five minutes. The match finished 4–1 for FC Barcelona. The longest European adventure of Flamurtari ended after second leg. Even won narrowly 1–0 against Spanish giants, FC Barcelona. In the same season Leonidha Çuri won Flamurtari its second Albanian Cup after beating Partizani Tiranë 1–0. After that year Leonidha Curi was fired. Then in 1988 Leonidha was chosen by Traktori Lushnja to manage their team.

In 1990 Leonidha was hired to become an assistant for the Albania national football team with fellow friend and manager of that team, Agron Sulaj. He stayed until that year.

In 1992 Leonidha Çuri became the assistant manager of Levadiakos FC. While staying until 1993. In 1996, Leonidha returned to Flamurtari Vlorë finishing 3rd in the 1996–1997 Albanian Superliga.

He later managed the Greece National Futsal Team, Flamurtari, and the Albania National Futsal Team. Leonidha Çuri is widely regarded as one of Albania’s greatest managers.

== Honours ==
- Albanian Cup: 2

1985, 1988
