= Alfred Zijai =

Albanian footballer

Personal information
- Date of birth: 7 February 1961
- Place of birth: Vlorë, Albania
- Date of death: 11 February 2013 (aged 52)
- Position: Midfielder

Senior career*
Years	Team	Apps	(Gls)
1979–1991	Flamurtari Vlorë		

International career
1986–1987	Albania	3	(0)
- * Club domestic league appearances and goals

Alfred Zijai (7 February 1961 – 11 February 2013) was an Albanian footballer who played as a midfielder.

== Club career ==
Born in Vlorë, Zijai spent his entire career with hometown club Flamurtari during the 1970s and 1980s, during the club's golden years alongside fellow international players like Sokol Kushta, Kreshnik Çipi, Petro Ruçi, Alfred Ferko and Rrapo Taho. Playing for them between 1979 and 1991, he won the Albanian Cup in 1985 and 1988, and the Kategoria e Parë in 1991. In the 1987–88 season, he and his Flamurtari teammates managed to knock out Partizan Belgrade and Wismut Aue, before losing for a second successive year to Spanish giants FC Barcelona in the UEFA Cup.

== International career ==
He made his debut for Albania in an October 1986 European Championship qualification match away at Austria and earned a total of 3 caps, scoring no goals. His final international was a November 1987 European Championship qualification match against Spain.

== Futsal ==
Zijai became a member of the executive committee of the Albanian Football Association, and founded the Futsal Organisation of Albania.

== Personal life and death ==
A father of two, Zijai suffered from a liver disease. He died on 11 February 2013, at the age of 52.

== Honours ==
- Albanian Superliga: 1

1991

- Albanian Cup: 2

1985, 1988
