= Latif Gjondeda =

Albanian footballer

Personal information
- Date of birth: 28 December 1960 (age 65)
- Place of birth: Albania
- Position: Defender

Youth career
- Flamurtari

Senior career*
Years	Team	Apps	(Gls)
1983–1996	Flamurtari		

International career
1987–1992	Albania	5	(0)

Managerial career
- 1997: Flamurtari
- * Club domestic league appearances and goals

Latif Gjondeda (born 28 December 1960) is an Albanian retired football defender, who played for Flamurtari and the Albania national team.

== Club career ==
Gjondeda spent his entire career with Flamurtari in the 1980s and 1990s during the club's golden years, alongside fellow international players like Eqerem Memushi, Kreshnik Çipi, Rrapo Taho, Roland Iljadhi and Agim Bubeqi.

== International career ==
He made his debut for Albania in an October 1987 European Championship qualification match against Romania and earned a total of 5 caps, scoring no goals. His final international was a January 1992 friendly match against Greece.

== Later years ==
Gjondeda was assistant to manager Eqerem Memushi when Flamurtari won the 2009 Albanian Cup. After he was a teacher at “rilindja” school in Vlore

== Honours ==
- Albanian Superliga: 1

1991

- Albanian Cup: 2

1985, 1988
