= 1990–91 Albanian Cup =

Kupa e Shqipërisë

Tournament details
- Country: Albania

Final positions
- Champions: Partizani
- Runners-up: Flamurtari

1990–91 Albanian Cup (Albanian: Kupa e Shqipërisë) was the thirty-ninth season of Albania's annual cup competition. It began in August 1990 with the First Round and ended in May 1991 with the Final match. The winners of the competition qualified for the 1991-92 first round of the UEFA Cup. Dinamo Tirana were the defending champions, having won their twelfth Albanian Cup last season. The cup was won by Partizani.

The first round was played in a single round-robin matches within 8 qualifying groups. The other rounds were played in a two-legged format similar to those of European competitions. If the aggregated score was tied after both games, the team with the higher number of away goals advanced. If the number of away goals was equal in both games, the match was decided by extra time and a penalty shootout, if necessary.

== First round ==
Games were played on August & September 1990

=== Group 1 ===
Pos	Team	Pld	W	D	L	GF	GA	GD	Pts	Qualification
1	Dinamo Tirana	5	4	0	1	18	2	+16	8	Advance to second round
2	Erzeni	5	3	1	1	8	2	+6	7	Advance to second round
3	Industriali	5	2	1	2	9	7	+2	5	
4	Tërbuni	5	2	1	2	5	11	−6	5	
5	Korabi	5	1	2	2	5	7	−2	4	
6	18 Shkurti	5	0	1	4	3	19	−16	1	

Source: Calciomondialeweb.it
Rules for classification: 1) points; 2) goal difference; 3) number of goals scored.

=== Group 2 ===
Pos	Team	Pld	W	D	L	GF	GA	GD	Pts	Qualification
1	Partizani	5	4	1	0	15	0	+15	9	Advance to second round
2	Skënderbeu	5	4	0	1	12	5	+7	8	Advance to second round
3	Studenti	5	2	1	2	8	10	−2	5	
4	Dajti	5	1	2	2	6	11	−5	4	
5	Domozdova	5	0	2	3	6	12	−6	2	
6	10 Korriku	5	0	2	3	5	14	−9	2	

Source: Calciomondialeweb.it
Rules for classification: 1) points; 2) goal difference; 3) number of goals scored.

=== Group 3 ===
Pos	Team	Pld	W	D	L	GF	GA	GD	Pts	Qualification
1	Flamurtari	5	5	0	0	16	4	+12	10	Advance to second round
2	24 Maji	5	4	0	1	6	6	0	8	Advance to second round
3	Traktori	5	2	1	2	11	6	+5	5	
4	Minatori Tepelena	5	1	2	2	7	5	+2	4	
5	Trbeshina	5	1	0	4	1	12	−11	2	
6	Minatori Memaliaj	5	0	1	4	1	9	−8	1	

Source: Calciomondialeweb.it
Rules for classification: 1) points; 2) goal difference; 3) number of goals scored.

=== Group 4 ===
Pos	Team	Pld	W	D	L	GF	GA	GD	Pts	Qualification
1	Kastrioti	5	4	1	0	9	5	+4	9	Advance to second round
2	17 Nëntori	5	3	1	1	16	3	+13	7	Advance to second round
3	Butrinti	5	1	2	2	6	11	−5	4	
4	Ballshi i Ri	5	2	0	3	7	10	−3	4	
5	21 Shkurti	4	1	1	2	3	4	−1	3	
6	Vullneti	4	0	1	3	3	11	−8	1	

Source: Calciomondialeweb.it
Rules for classification: 1) points; 2) goal difference; 3) number of goals scored.

=== Group 5 ===
Pos	Team	Pld	W	D	L	GF	GA	GD	Pts	Qualification
1	Vllaznia	5	3	2	0	16	9	+7	8	Advance to second round
2	Veleçiku	5	3	1	1	9	5	+4	7	Advance to second round
3	Besëlidhja	5	3	0	2	12	8	+4	6	
4	31 Korriku	5	3	0	2	10	8	+2	6	
5	Përparimi	5	1	0	4	5	16	−11	2	
6	Valbona	5	0	1	4	3	9	−6	1	

Source: Calciomondialeweb.it
Rules for classification: 1) points; 2) goal difference; 3) number of goals scored.

=== Group 6 ===
Pos	Team	Pld	W	D	L	GF	GA	GD	Pts	Qualification
1	Apolonia	5	3	2	0	16	3	+13	8	Advance to second round
2	Naftëtari	5	3	1	1	8	2	+6	7	Advance to second round
3	Labinoti	5	3	1	1	8	7	+1	7	
4	Vetëtima	5	1	2	2	6	8	−2	4	
5	Bistrica	5	0	2	3	4	13	−9	2	
6	Sopoti	5	1	0	4	3	12	−9	2	

Source: Calciomondialeweb.it
Rules for classification: 1) points; 2) goal difference; 3) number of goals scored.

=== Group 7 ===
Pos	Team	Pld	W	D	L	GF	GA	GD	Pts	Qualification
1	Luftëtari	5	4	0	1	13	5	+8	8	Advance to second round
2	Ylli i Kuq	5	3	2	0	7	3	+4	8	Advance to second round
3	Lokomotiva Durrës	5	2	1	2	7	5	+2	5	
4	5 Shtatori	5	2	0	3	7	8	−1	4	
5	Devolli	5	1	1	3	4	11	−7	3	
6	Gramozi	5	0	2	3	4	10	−6	2	

Source: Calciomondialeweb.it
Rules for classification: 1) points; 2) goal difference; 3) number of goals scored.

=== Group 8 ===
Pos	Team	Pld	W	D	L	GF	GA	GD	Pts	Qualification
1	Besa	5	4	1	0	11	4	+7	9	Advance to second round
2	Tomori	5	3	2	0	15	2	+13	8	Advance to second round
3	Shkumbini	5	2	1	2	9	11	−2	5	
4	Punëtori	5	2	0	3	9	10	−1	4	
5	Turbina	5	0	2	3	4	8	−4	2	
6	Minatori Rrëshen	5	1	0	4	8	21	−13	2	

Source: Calciomondialeweb.it
Rules for classification: 1) points; 2) goal difference; 3) number of goals scored.

== Second round ==
All sixteen teams of the 1989–90 Superliga and First Division entered in this round. First and second legs were played in January 1991.

Team 1	Agg.	Team 2	1st leg	2nd leg
Vllaznia	1–3	17 Nëntori	1–0	0–3
Veleçiku	1–2	Partizani	1–0	0–2
Dinamo Tirana	3–1	24 Maji	3–0	0–1
Naftëtari	4–5	Apolonia	3–1	1–4
Kastrioti	6–1	Skënderbeu	3–0	3–1
Flamurtari	6–0	Tomori	4–0	2–0
Ylli i Kuq	1–3	Luftëtari	1–1	0–2
Besa	3–1	Erzeni	3–0	0–1

== Quarter-finals ==
In this round entered the 8 winners from the previous round.

Team 1	Agg.	Team 2	1st leg	2nd leg
Apolonia	4–0	Luftëtari	2–0	2–0
Partizani	4–0	Besa	2–0	2–0
Kastrioti	3–4	Dinamo Tirana	2–1	1–3
Flamurtari	2–1	17 Nëntori	2–0	0–1

== Semi-finals ==
In this round entered the four winners from the previous round.

Team 1	Score	Team 2
Partizani	1–0	Apolonia
Flamurtari	4–1	Dinamo Tirana

== Final ==
15 June 1991
17:30

Partizani	1–1	Flamurtari
Berberi 9'		Lutaj 22'
Penalties
Musta (penalty scored); Dosti (penalty scored); Shulku (penalty missed); Hasanpapa (penalty scored); Muça (penalty scored)	4–3	(penalty scored) Memushi; (penalty scored) Gjondeda; (penalty scored) Lutaj; (penalty missed) Daullja; (penalty missed) Arapi

Qemal Stafa Stadium, Tirana
Attendance: 18,600
Referee: Plarent Kotherja
