= Football in Albania =

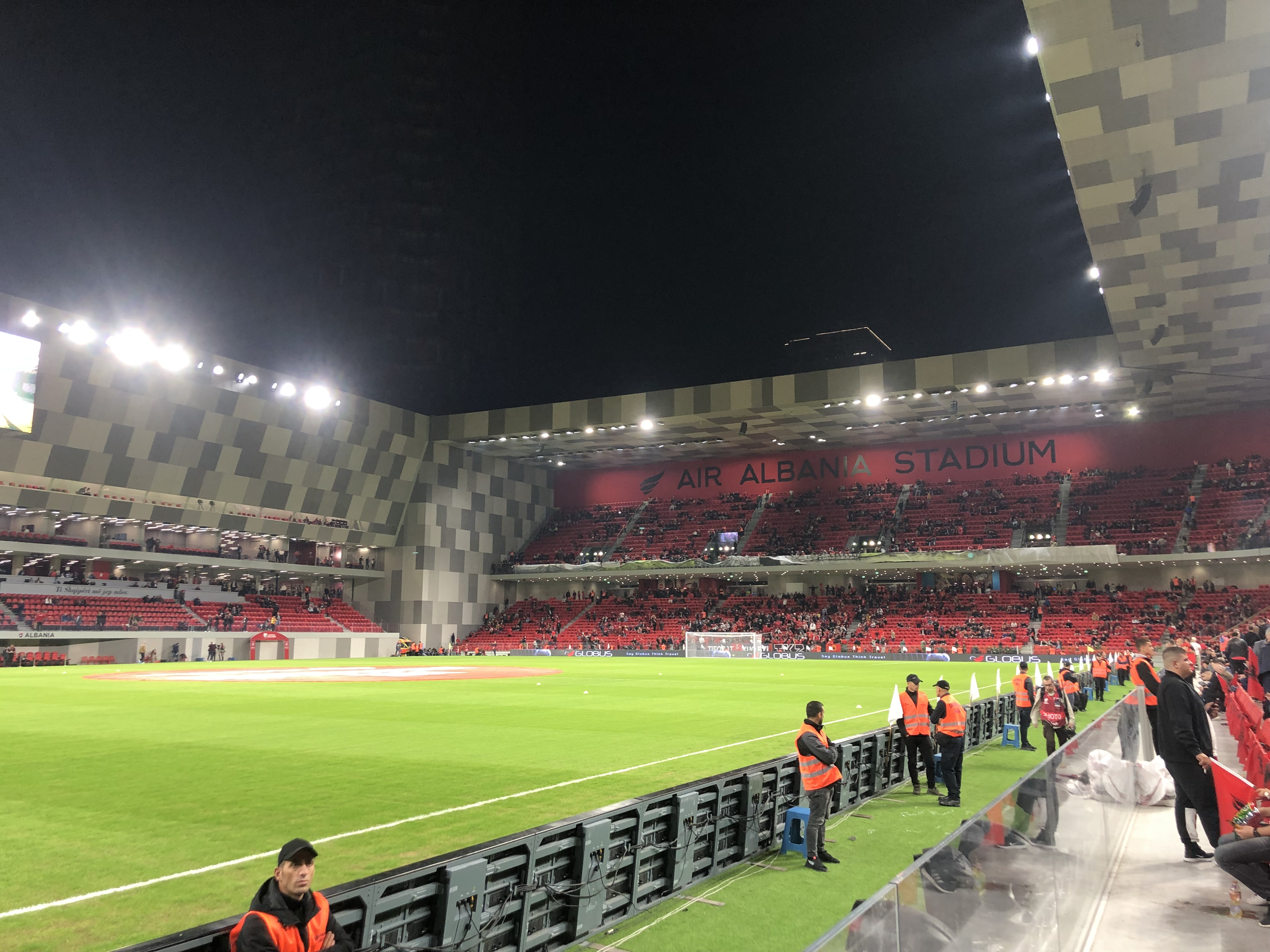
- The Arena Kombëtare during inauguration match between Albania and France
- Country: Albania
- Governing body: Albanian Football Association
- National team: Men's national team

National competitions
- FIFA World Cup; UEFA European Championship; UEFA Nations League

Club competitions
- Cups: Albanian Cup Albanian Supercup League: Kategoria Superiore Kategoria e Parë Kategoria e Dytë Kategoria e Tretë Sunday League Tiranë Sunday League Korçë Kategoria Amatore I Kategoria Amatore II Kategoria Amatore III

International competitions
- FIFA Club World Cup; UEFA Champions League; UEFA Europa League; UEFA Europa Conference League; UEFA Super Cup

Football is the most popular sport in Albania, both at a participatory and spectator level. The sport is governed by the Albanian Football Federation (FSHF) (Albanian: Federata Shqiptare e Futbollit).

== History of football in Albania ==
Football arrived in Albania at the beginning of the 20th century. The first recorded match was between students at a Christian mission in Shkodër. The game increased in popularity and by 1919 the first club, KS Vllaznia Shkodër, had been founded. In 1920 SK Tirana was founded. Other towns and cities followed suit and on 6 June 1930 the Football Association of Albania (FSHF) was established. The association became a member of football's governing body FIFA in 1932, and joined the European governing body UEFA in 1954 as a founding member.

A domestic championship began in 1930 with 6 teams. KF Tirana were the inaugural winners. They, together with such sides are KS Dinamo Tirana, Vllaznia Shkodër and FK Partizani, have continued to dominate the Albanian scene until the present day. The years following World War II saw a new political order, with the introduction of a communist system which had a positive impact as far as the game's appeal was concerned. Football was used as popular entertainment. Its infrastructure grew stronger as the game was organized and developed in state enterprises, schools, villages and towns. New institutional clubs were founded such as Partizani Tirana (1946) and Dinamo Tirana (1950) (governed respectively by the Ministry of Defence and the Ministry of Internal Affairs). Until 1990 they were privileged in relation to the other clubs as they were able to get players from other teams.

From 1991, there were crucial political and economic changes that had a tremendous effect on the nation, as the centralized economy and political system came to an end. The result for the country's footballers was an opportunity to play their trade on foreign fields. Neighbouring Greece and the Balkan states were popular destinations for players who were good enough to go abroad.

== League and Cup system ==
The Albanian league is split into 4 divisions. The Albanian Superliga (Albanian: Kategoria Superiore) was formed in 1930. In 1998 it took its current name and is the highest level of Albanian Football. It currently comprises 10 teams. The Superliga displaced the First Division (Albanian: Kategoria e Parë) as the top division, and this is now Albanian Football's second tier. Below this is Second Division (Albanian: Kategoria e Dytë), which is divided geographically into A & B.

The winners of the league are entitled to compete in the UEFA Champions League at the First qualifying round stage. The runners-up are entitled to compete in the UEFA Conference League, also at the First qualifying round stage. KF Tirana hold the record for Albanian league titles, with 26.

Level	League(s)/Division(s)
1	Kategoria Superiore; 10 clubs
	↓↑ 2-3 clubs
2	Kategoria e Parë; 12 clubs
	↓↑ 2-4 clubs
3	Kategoria e Dytë; 23 clubs
	↓↑ 2-4 clubs
4	Kategoria e Tretë; 21 clubs

=== Cup competitions ===
The Albanian Football Cup (Albanian: Kupa e Shqipërisë), which is the country's main knockout cup competition, was established in 1939. The winners are entitled to compete in the UEFA Europa League, at the First qualifying round stage. The most successful team in this competition, KF Partizani Tirana, has won the cup 15 times.

The Albanian Supercup, which started in 1989, is a single match played at the beginning of the season between the winners of the Superliga and the Albanian Cup. The most successful team in this competition, KF Tirana, has won 9 times.

=== Women's football ===
- Top-tier: Kategoria Superiore Femra

== Albanian football clubs in European competitions ==
Albanian football clubs have a long history in European football. The most successful clubs in the past were KF Tirana and Flamurtari FC as well as FK Partizani Tirana. In recent history KF Skënderbeu Korçë were quite successful in the UEFA Europa League.

=== European Cup / UEFA Champions League ===
The first Albanian club to enter the European Cup was FK Partizani Tirana in 1962-63 playing in the first round against Norrköping losing out after two legs despite drawing at home with 1–1 in the second leg. The following year, Partizani won their first-ever match in the European Cup 1963-64 in the first leg against Plovdiv through a goal from Kolec Kraja. In the second leg away from home, Partizani nearly qualified for the second round but lost 1-3 despite a goal from Panajot Pano. One year later in 1964–65 Partizani Tirana faced 1. FC Köln from Germany in the preliminary round. The Albanians surprised the Germans and held a 0–0 draw at home. In the second leg in Cologne Partizani Tirana lost the match 0–2.

KF Tirana first entered the European Football scene in 1969-70. After losing the first leg against Belgian team Standard Liège 0–3 away from home, they drew at home 1–1 thanks to a late goal from Josif Kazanxhi.

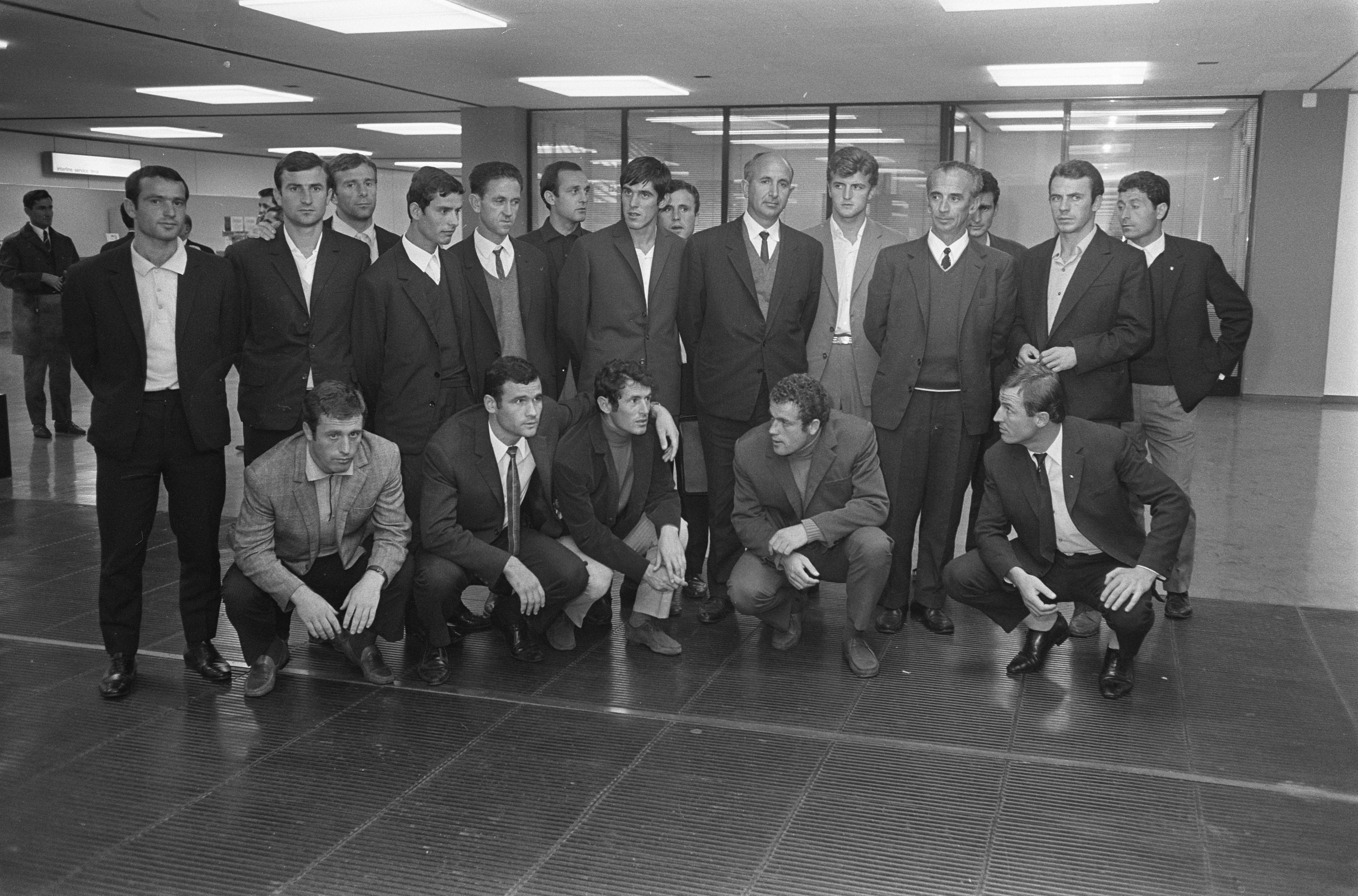
KF Tirana (Sept. 1970) before facing Ajax Amsterdam

In the following year, KF Tirana faced Eredivisie team AFC Ajax in the 1970–71 European Cup in the first round. Tirana drew Ajax 2–2 after losing 0–2 at home. The Albanians equalized the game thanks to goals from Josif Kazanxhi and Ceco. Tirana faced Ajax in the second leg at the Olympisch Stadion in Amsterdam. Ajax won the game 2–0 and went on to win the Cup.

KF Vllaznia Shkodër debuted at the European Cup 1978-79 facing FK Austria Wien in the first round. Vllaznia beat Austria in the first leg 2–0 with goals from Medin Zhega and Shyqyri Ballgjini. In the following match, Vllaznia had good chances to qualify as the first Albanian football club in the round of 16. The hopes were dashed for Vllaznia as they lost with 4–1 away in Wien.

Partizani Tirana qualified for the Cup for the fourth time in 1979–80 and beat Celtic 1–0 in the first match with a header from Agim Murati in the 35th minute. Celtic turned things around and beat Partizani 4–1 despite an own goal in the Celtic Park in Glasgow.

Two years later in the 1981–82 European Cup, Partizani Tirana faced Austria Wien in the first round. Partizani lost the first leg away match 1–3. The Albanians played the second leg at home in the Qemal Stafa Stadium and won 1–0. Haxhi Ballgjini scored the goal for Partizani in the 31st minute. Partizani needed to score two goals to qualify into the second round, and they were eliminated from the competition despite the victory.

=== The historical 1980's in the European cup for the Albanian Football clubs ===
The following year at the 1982–83 European Cup KF Tirana faced Linfield F.C. in the first round. The teams played the first leg in Tirana. Tirana won the match 1–0 with a goal from Agustin Kola. In the second leg match, Tirana faced Linfied at Windsor Park in Belfast. Arben Minga scored in the 28th minute, but Linfied scored two quick goals in the final minutes of the match. Despite the 2–1 away loss, KF Tirana qualified as the first Albanian football club in history for the round of 16 in the European Cup. The team would have played against Dynamo Kyiv in the round of 16, but Tirana did not participate.

After several years without success for Albania, KF Tirana competed for the sixth time in history at the European Cup in 1988-89. The team faced the Hamrun Spartans from Malta in the first round. In the first leg, they played away from home at National Stadium in Ta' Qali. KF Tirana started with a goal from Anesti Stoja in the 5th minute, but Ħamrun scored two goals to win the match 2–1. In the second leg, Tirana defeated the Spartans 2–0 to qualify for the round of 16. In the first leg of the round of 16, Tirana faced IFK Göteborg at home and lost the match 0–3. Tirana defeated IFK Göteborg 1–0 in the second leg at Ullevi stadium but did not qualify for the quarter-finals.

In the following European Cup in 1989–90, KF Tirana faced Maltese team Sliema Wanderers F.C. in the first round. The first leg was played away from home in the National Stadium. The Albanians lost 0–1. KF Tirana won the second leg game 5–0 with goals from Agustin Kola, Bardhi, Hodja, and Florian Riza to advance to the round of 16 for the third time in the club's history. In the round of 16, KF Tirana faced Bundesliga team FC Bayern Munich from Germany. In the first leg at the Olympiastadion in Munich, KF Tirana lost 3–1. In the second match, Tirana faced Bayern at home and lost 0–3.

=== UEFA Cup / UEFA Europa League ===
Albania did not compete in the UEFA Cup as much as they did in the UEFA Cup Winners' Cup or in the European Cup, despite Albania's success in the late '80s. Flamutari Vlora and, in recent years, KF Skënderbeu Korçë have been the most successful Albanian teams in the UEFA Cup.

Dinamo Tirana became the first Albanian football team to debut in the UEFA Cup during the 1981-82 competition. In the first round, they faced Carl Zeiss Jena from East Germany. In the first leg, Dinamo faced the opposition at home at Selman Stërmasi Stadium, winning 1–0 with a goal from Vasillaq Zëri. Dinamo Tirana had to travel to Jena to face Carl Zeiss at Ernst-Abbe-Sportfeld in the second leg. The Albanians lost 4–0 and failed to qualify for the second round.

In the 1985–86 UEFA Cup Dinamo Tirana faced the Ħamrun Spartans from Malta. In the first leg, Dinamo defeated the Spartans 1–0 at home with a goal from Eduard Abazi. Dinamo drew the away game in the second leg 0–0 to qualify as the first Albanian football club in the second round. In the second round, Dinamo Tirana faced Portuguese side Sporting Lisabon. In the first leg, Tirana held a 0–0 draw at home. Away from home at José Alvalade Stadium in Lisbon, Tirana lost 0–1 and was knocked out of the competition.

Flamurtari Vlora debuted at the UEFA Cup 1986–87. They faced FC Barcelona in the first round. The teams played the first leg at the Flamurtari Stadium. Flamutari put themselves in front with a goal from Vasil Ruci in the 68 minute. Barcelona equalized in the 88th minute to secure a 1–1 draw in Vlora. In the second leg, Flamutari traveled to Spain to face Barcelona at Camp Nou. The game ended in a 0–0 draw. Barcelona advanced and knocked Flamutari out of the competition due to the away rule.

Flamutari qualified for a second consecutive UEFA Cup in 1987–88. Flamutari faced in the first round Yugoslavian side Partizan Belgrad. Flamutari won the first leg match at home 2–0 through an own goal and a goal from Roland Iljadhi. The teams played the second leg at Partizan Stadium in Belgrade. The situation was tense between the Albanians and Serbians, due to the political unrest in Kosovo. Partizan led the match 2–0 until Sokol Kushta scored to clinch a 2–1 result and advance Flamutari to the second round for the first time in the history for Albania in the UEFA Cup.

Flamutari Vlora faced East German side Wismut Aue in the second round. Flamutari lost the first leg match at the Otto-Grotewohl-Stadion in Aue 1–0. They won the second leg match at home 2–0 with goals from Rrapo Taho and Vasil Ruci to become the first Albanian team to qualify for the round of 16 in the UEFA Cup. They also became the first Albanian side to beat two clubs in a UEFA competition after two rounds were played.

Flamutari faced FC Barcelona for the second time in their history in the third round at the Camp Nou. Flamutari was down 1–0 at halftime, but three quick goals in the second half put Barca up 4–0. Vasil Ruci scored a penalty kick to bring the final score to 4–1. In the following leg, Flamutari defeated Barca 1–0 in the fully crowded Flamurtari Stadium in Vlora with a goal from Sokol Kushta. Despite the win, Flamutari did not qualify for the quarterfinals. As of May 2022, Flamutari's 1987–88 UEFA Cup performance was the most successful result for Albania in a UEFA competition.

=== UEFA Cup Winners' Cup ===
Several Albanian football clubs, including KF Besa Kavajë, KF Tirana, and KF Vllaznia Shkodër have participated in the UEFA Cup Winners' Cup.

Albania's debut at the competition came in 1968-69 when FK Partizani Tirana faced Italian side Torino F.C. In the first leg, Partizani Tirana defeated Torino at home. In the second leg, the Albanians lost 3–1 away and failed to advance to the quarterfinals. Torino advanced directly to the quarterfinals after the match.

In the 1970–71 European Cup Winners' Cup, Partizani Tirana faced Swedish team Åtvidabergs FF in the preliminary round in the Kopparvallen. Partizani drew the away match 1–1. In the following leg at home, the Albanians won 2–0 with goals from Panajot Pano and Ramazan Rragami. The round was the first time Partizani advanced in a UEFA competition after drawing in the first leg.

At the following 1971–72 European Cup Winners' Cup, Dinamo Tirana debuted against Austrian side Austria Wien. Dinamo held a 1–1 draw at home with a penalty goal from Iljaz Çeço. At the following game at the Praterstadion in Vienna, the Albanians lost 1–0 and failed to advance to the round of sixteen.

In the following 1972-73 UEFA Cup Winners' season, KF Besa Kavajë debuted in the first round against Fremad Amager from Denmark. The Albanians drew away from home 1–1 and secured a 0–0 draw at home to become the first Albanian club to advance to the round of sixteen at the competition.

The Albanians faced Scottish side Hibernian in the round of sixteen. In the first leg away, Besa lost 7–1 despite a goal from M.Kariqi. In the following leg at the Besa Stadium, the Albanians failed to make up the six goal deficit and were knocked out of the competition, drawing 1–1 with a goal from K.Pagria.

After some years in which Albania couldn't take place at this competition, they would return several years later in 1980-81 in which FK Partizani Tirana, faced Malmö from Sweden. In the first round. Despite a close match they would lose the first leg with 1–0 away. Notably they drew their home leg with 0–0, still not enough to qualify further.

Two years later in the 1982-83 edition Dinamo Tirana faced in the first round Aberdeen F.C. from Scotland. In the first leg they would lose close with 1–0 despite playing a good match. At the second leg they couldn't overcome a 0–0 in Tirana and so left the competition once again in the first round. Notable fact Aberdeen would than go on and eventually win the competition that particular year, after winning against Real Madrid in the finals.

In the 1983-84 edition 17 Nëntori Tirana would make their debut, at this competition. Their first tie was against Swedish side Hammarby. Away from home they couldn't compete against the opponent, as they faced a staggering defeat in the Söderstadion with 4–0 in the end. Despite losing the first match, in the second leg they, improved on their performance. Winning at home with 2–1 thanks to goals from Arben Vila and Sulejman Mema. Securing Albania their first win after more than 10 years, in this competition.

== The history of the Albania national football team ==
=== Pre war history of Albania ===
Founded on 6 June 1930, Albania had to wait 16 years to play its first international match, which was against Yugoslavia in 1946. In 1932, Albania had already joined FIFA (during the congress 12–16 June) and in 1954 it was one of the founding members of UEFA. Albania was invited to play in the 1938 World Cup, but did not take part due to logistical problems.

=== Champion of the Balkans in 1946 ===
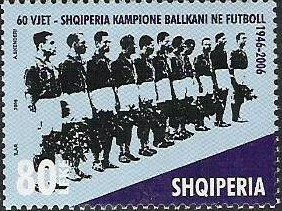
2007 postage stamp of Albania dedicated to the Albania squad that won the 1946 Balkan Cup

The early years oversaw a notably successful Balkan Cup in the 1946 campaign. Albania won the cup after overcoming Yugoslavia on level points but a better goal difference. The final match ended in a 1–0 win against Romania. Four days earlier, Albania had already beaten Bulgaria 3–1. Albania wasn't expected to participate, but the withdrawal of Greece from the tournament offered Albania a chance to join in the re-established post-war cup.

=== Between the best 16 Teams in Europe at the UEFA Euro 1964 ===
Albania qualified for the first time in their history at the UEFA Euro 1964 in Spain, for its first-ever major men's national football Tournament. Albania faced Greece in the first round. They wouldn't participate as Greece withdrew and Albania being given a walkover and advancing so to the Round of 16 in this Tournament. In the Round of 16 the Albanians would face Denmark. In the first leg they lost out with 4–0 away from home. Despite their win at the second leg in Tirana, through an early goal from Panajot Pano. Albania couldn't progress to the quarterfinals. At the end of this tournament Albania ranked 9th. It was the only time Albania was between the best 16 teams of Europe.

=== 1964–72 Albania participating in Football at the Summer Olympics qualifying tournaments ===
Albania would participate for the first time in their history at the 1964 Summer Olympics in the men's qualification tournament. In which the Albanians faced Bulgaria in the preliminary round. Albania would lose both matches close with 0–1 against the Bulgarians, missing out on the next stage. Albania then participate for the second and last time in their Football history at the 1972 Summer Olympics held in Munich. In the Men's European Qualifiers they would face Romania in the play-off stage. In the first leg they lost with 2–1 away from home despite an equalizer scored by Medin Zhega in the 55th Minute of this match. At the second leg Albania faced the Romanians in the Qemal Stafa Stadium in Tirana. The Albanians started the match well as Panajot Pano puts Albania in front in the 29th minute but once again they couldn't held on to the result. As Romania scored further two goals in the end, to beat Albania once more with 1–2 this time around.

=== Albania's historical 1986 FIFA World Cup qualification ===
Albania would face in this qualification Belgium, Poland and their rivals Greece. In the first match they faced Belgium in Brussels. The Albanians lost with 3–1 despite the equalizer from Bedri Omuri in the 71st minute. Albania would face away from home against Poland in the Stadion Stali Mielec. They drew the result through goals from Bedri Omuri and even the leading goal from Agustin Kola with 2-1 but at the end Poland scored again. Albania missing out on their first win, in this qualification. After that Albania famously beat Belgium at home with 2–0 in the Qemal Stafa Stadium. The goals were scored by Mirel Josa and Arben Minga securing Albania their first and only win in this qualification. As Albania loss their next two games against Greece away with 2-0 and against Poland at home close with 0–1. Missing out close to qualify for the 1986 FIFA World Cup. In their last match they faced Greece at home in Tirana. They go in front by a goal from Bedri Omuri but they couldn't hold on as Greece equalized the result in the 54th minute. At the end playing a 1–1 draw. Despite finishing their campaign with four points in the third place. Albania came close to qualify as they nearly beat every opponent in this group. It was their most successful FIFA World Cup qualification in the history of Albania.

=== Albania's turn around in results between 2004 and 2006 ===
After a poor start in which Albania would draw at home against Switzerland with 1–1 by a goal from Edvin Murati but lost in the next match away against Russia with 4–1 despite an earlier equalizer scored by Klodian Duro Albania sacked their manager Giuseppe Dossena and replaced him with German Hans-Peter Briegel for the following match. against Russia in the Loro Boriçi Stadium in Shkodër. In which the Albanians won 3-1 through goals from Altin Rraklli, Altin Lala and Igli Tare to secure Hans-Peter Briegel in his debut match, as a manager, his maiden win for Albania. He led Albania to an undefeated run at home matches by drawing against Republic of Ireland 0–0 and beating in the last match Georgia 3–1 by goals from Besnik Hasi, Igli Tare and striker Alban Bushi. Despite the good results, Albania finished the group in the penultimate spot with eight points. Away, Albania could not score any points, but managed to score 4 goals. Missing close out on the Playoffs stage by six points.

Two months after Greece beat Portugal to win the European Championship, Albania defeated Greece 2–1 at home by two quick goals from Edvin Murati and Adrian Aliaj, denting the Greeks' possibility to qualify. The Albanians led the table for the first time in a qualification after this match. Albania went on to disappoint by losing to Georgia away and Denmark at home, before returning to winning ways by beating Kazakhstan 0–1 with a goal from Alban Bushi. Then, Albania played Ukraine, Turkey, and Greece, losing all three matches. Later Albania beat Georgia 3–2 by two goals from Igli Tare and one from Ervin Skela as well as beating Kazakhstan with 2–1 by goals from Florian Myrtaj and striker Erjon Bogdani. The last positive result for Albania in this qualification would be a 2–2 away draw with Ukraine where Bogdani scored two goals. At the end, Albania got 13 points, and four wins in their best result then. They surpassed for the first time in their history two nations in the qualifying standings.

=== World Cup 2014 qualifying ===
Albania started the qualifiers well, notably defeating Cyprus with 3–1 by goals from Armando Sadiku, Edgar Çani and Erjon Bogdani as well as beating Slovenia at home with 1–0 by a goal from Odise Roshi. which was followed by an unprecedent away win at Norway in Oslo after a stunning goal from Hamdi Salihi. Albania would also draw against Norway at home despite leading the match with a goal from Valdet Rama, this match ending in a 1–1 draw. The team was at one point 2nd with 6 matches played and 4 to spare, but failed to be successful in the last four, losing away in Slovenia and Iceland, as well at home against Switzerland, and drawing in Cyprus. With De Biasi, the Albania national team reached an unprecedented high number of players, who although are ethnically Albanian, were not born in Albania, but either in Kosovo, or outside of Kosovo, while hailing from Kosovo Albania parents. In 2011–13, 14 Albanians of Kosovo origin were either part of the start-up team, or had received recent call-ups.

=== UEFA Euro 2016 qualification ===
The qualifying draw took place on 23 February 2014. Albania was drawn in Group I along with Portugal, Denmark, Serbia, and Armenia. Qualifying matches started in September 2014. Albania started the qualifiers with a historic result as they beat group favourites Portugal 1–0 away thanks to a goal from Bekim Balaj. In the second match against Denmark at the newly renovated Elbasan Arena, Albania was in the lead until the 82nd minute where Lasse Vibe equalized, with the match ending 1–1. In the next game against Serbia at Partizan Stadium, the match was abandoned in 42nd minute after several on and off the field incidents. Despite the violence by Serbia's hooligans against Albania at Partizan Stadium, Serbia was awarded the 3–0 victory after the decision by UEFA. The decision was appealed by both Serbia and Albania, but the decision was upheld by UEFA. Both associations then filed further appeals to the Court of Arbitration for Sport, and on 10 July 2015 the Court of Arbitration for Sport rejected the appeal filed by the Serbian FA, and upholds in part the appeal filed by the Albanian FA, meaning the match is deemed to have been forfeited by Serbia with 0–3 and they are still deducted three points.

In the fourth match against Armenia at home, Albania were behind from the 4th minute after an own goal from Mërgim Mavraj, but Mavraj equalized in the 77th minute with a powerful header. Four minutes later Shkëlzen Gashi scored the winner, putting Albania in the 2nd position along with Denmark with 10 points. It was the first time that Albania ended the first part of the qualifiers in the second spot. Albania made history again by beating one-time world champions and UEFA Euro 2016 hosts France at the Elbasan Arena in the "Group I" friendly match. After a draw against Denmark, Albania clinched at least a play-off place. Despite losing to Portugal and Serbia, Albania defeated Armenia 3–0 in Yerevan and qualified for UEFA Euro 2016, for its first appearance at a major men's football tournament after 50 years.

=== Albania at the UEFA Euro 2016 ===
Albania qualified for the UEFA Euro 2016 held in France. They were drawn in a strong group with the host France, Switzerland and Romania. In their second ever campaign Albania started their first Groupstage Match against Switzerland. Despite being 0–1 down after an unlucky conceded goal from F.Schär in the 5th minute. Albania did play a strong match even though with 10 men because Lorik Cana got a red card for holding the ball with his hand in the 36th minute. Albania did everything in the second half and had 6 minutes before the end an amazing chance to equalize in the closing stage of the match, to get a deserved draw but Shkelzen Gashi missed a sitter in front off the goal. Despite that the Albanian team was praised by the football community for their strong performance. Albania would play against France in their second group game. Until the end Albania hold in Marseille a strong 0–0 draw but in the end Albania conceded two goals from Antoine Griezmann and Dimitri Payet to lose in the end with 2–0. Albania would face in their last Groupstage match Romania. Albania would win this match with 0–1 by a beautiful header scored by Armando Sadiku in the 43rd minute. In the second half Albania defended the result and secured their first win after 50 years in a UEFA European Championship in their history. However, the team finished last among the third-placed teams and didn't progress beyond the group stage.

In 2020, Albania won for the first time a group by finishing first in group 4 of UEFA Nations League C. Albania also won a spot for the play-offs of 2022 World Cup and was promoted in UEFA Nations League B.

=== 2021–2023: From FIFA World Cup 2022 campaign to qualification for the UEFA Euro 2024 ===
After their close miss to qualify for the 2022 FIFA World Cup in Katar, in which Albania finished third in the Group with a record of six wins and 18 points along the way. Notably beating Hungary twice in fact with the same score. Albania would depart its way with Edoardo Reja after a shocking display for Albania in the 2022–23 UEFA Nations League Group 2 in Division B. In which the Albanians were performing badly especially against Israel losing at home 1–2 and away with the same score. Securing only two points in total both against Iceland 1–1 and 1–1 away as well. Still Albania secured another year in the same Division B after Russia being excluded from Group 2 in the first place.

In the UEFA Euro 2024 qualifying Group E Albania were drawn together with Czech Republic, Poland, Faroe Islands and Moldova. In which the new coach Sylvinho gave his debut for the Country. Albania lost his first match against Poland away close with 1-0 despite playing well. In the following matches Albania wouldn't lose any of them. Beating Moldova at home 2–0 with Jasir Asani scoring the goal of the Matchday for his side. Followed by a win against the Faroe Islands 1–3 away in which Kristjan Asllani scored a beautiful UEFA Match day winning goal for the second time running for Albania in their campaign. After a hard-earned 1–1 draw in Prague against the Czech Republic with a screamer goal from Nedim Bajrami. The Albanians were able to beat Poland in the Arena Kombëtare with 2–0 and another Jasir Asani mega goal. For the third time Albania scored the most beautiful goal of the Matchday. They would also beat the Czech Republic with a dominant 3–0 display. Albania would secure the Qualification for the second time in the History for the UEFA European Championship at the UEFA Euro 2024 in Germany, after drawing to Moldova 1–1 despite leading most of the match. Although drawing once more against the Faroe Islands Albania would finish the qualifications in the first place with 15 Points for the first time ever in their history. Being also eight Matches unbeaten during that period. They secured the second pot for the UEFA Group stage draws after ranking 10th in the power rankings.

== Achievements by Albania ==
- UEFA European Championship:
  - Round of 16 (1): 1964 European Nations' Cup qualification.
  - Groupstage (2): UEFA Euro 2016 in France, UEFA Euro 2024 in Germany.
- Balkan Cup:
  - Champions (1): 1946
- Malta International Football Tournament:
  - Champions (1): 2000
- UEFA Nations League
  - Promotion (1): 2020–21 UEFA Nations League C
- UEFA European Under-21 Championship
  - Quarterfinals (1): in 1984
- Balkan Youth Championship
  - Winners (2): 1978, 1981
- Football at the Mediterranean Games
  - 6th Place finish (1): at the 1991 Mediterranean Games for Albania (U23)
- UEFA European Under-19 Championship
  - Groupstage (1): by the Albania U19 in 1982
- WAFF U-19 Championship
  - Groupstage (1): in 2024
- UEFA European Under-17 Championship
  - Groupstage (2): by the Albania U17 in 1994 and also hosting the 2025 UEFA European Under-17 Championship.

=== Albanian football clubs in UEFA Club Competitions ===
- UEFA Champions League:
  - Round of 16 (3): KF Tirana in 1982, 1988, 1989 European Cup
- UEFA Europa League:
  - Round of 16 (1): Flamutari Vlora in 1987
  - Groupstage (2): KF Skënderbeu Korçë in 2015–16 and 2017–18
- UEFA Cup Winners' Cup:
  - Round of 16 (3): KF Besa Kavajë in 1972, KF Tirana in 1986 and KF Vllaznia Shkodër in the 1987 European Cup Winners' Cup
- Balkans Cup:
  - Winners (1): Partizani Tirana,
  - 1970 Balkans Cup

==== Albanian Female Football clubs in UEFA Competitions ====
- UEFA Women's Champions League
  - Round of 32 (1): by Vllaznia Shkodër in 2019–20 and they qualified to the Groupstage (1): by Vllaznia Shkodër in 2022–23

== Youth football in Albania ==
=== Balkan Youth Championship ===
Albania Under-21 participated in the Balkan Youth Championship as a successor to the Under-23 team, in the 1976–78 and 1981 competitions, winning both with finals against Romania and Bulgaria. Notably in 1978, the second leg of the final match against Romania was characterized by a large Albania's win 7–1, which is the largest win ever recorded by Albania U-21.

=== 1984 UEFA European Under-21 Football Championship ===
Albania Under-21s have managed to qualify only once in their history, and that came in the year 1984. They managed to qualify for the 1984 UEFA European Under-21 Football Championship, even though it was their first time competing in such tournament. Albania was drawn against a competitive group which included West Germany, Turkey and Austria. This historic event was the first time an Albanian squad qualified for a Europe or World Championship, and the fifth time any Albanian squad had qualified for the major championships. To this day, the team that qualified for 1984 UEFA European Under-21 Football Championship are still regarded as the most successful team in Albanian football history. Albania Under-21s managed to qualify without losing a single game and by getting two very good draws against the powerful football nation of West Germany.

Albania played the quarter-finals against Italy, against which it lost twice 0–1, and 0–1, in Albania and Italy respectively.

=== Albania under-19 football team ===
Than the Albania national under-18 football team were able to participate for the first time ever in the 1982 UEFA European Under-18 Championship after beating Cyprus 4–2 on aggregate in the Playoffs. in the Groupstage they faced in Group D: Scotland, Netherlands, and Turkey. Albania couldn't qualify after losing their first two matches against Scotland and the Netherlands, they secure one point against turkey in the last Groupstage match respectively. Their best result so far in their U19/18 history. In the following 1983 UEFA European Under-18 Championship Albania came close to qualify once more but they lost the Playoff Round against Bulgaria with 4–1 despite the close win in the second leg.

=== Albania under-17 football team ===
The Albania national under-17 football team debut participating came at the 1994 UEFA European Under-16 Championship in Ireland. In which Albania secured only one draw against Belarus. Losing close before to Austria and to Spain as well.

After more than thirty years without a participation the Under 17 of Albania will host the 2025 UEFA European Under-17 Championship, who will be held in Tirana.

== Albanian footballers ==
In the past Albania produced players such as Loro Boriçi who captained the Albania national football team, as well as Panajot Pano, Naim Kryeziu and Riza Lushta.

Naim Kryeziu started his long football career in SK Tirana where he played for six seasons winning four Kategoria Superiore between 1934 and 1939 as well as one Albanian Cup title in 1938–39. After 1939 he was noted by an Italian sports professor who suggested him to play for AS Roma. He then played for Roma between 1939 and 1947 scoring 27 goals and winning with them the 1941–42 Serie A title. His biggest achievement in his football career. Being the first Albanian footballer to win a Serie A title. He later would play successfully for S.S.C. Napoli scoring in five seasons 39 goals for the Gli Azzurris. Before retiring his footballing career in 1954. He scored 68 goals in the Seria A and is still even to this day one of the most successful Albanian footballers in the football history in Europe.

He later started a coaching career, serving also as AS Roma head coach for a short time during the 1963–64 season as a replacement for Alfredo Foni. he would coach A.S. Roma once more between 1970 and 1973 in his career.

Riza Lushta is a well known footballer in Albania and Italy. He started his football career in KF Tirana where he won the Kategoria Superiore four times in six seasons, he played with. He would then play for Seria A side S.S.C. Bari for the upcoming season. Where he scored three times in sixteen matches. His performances with Bari attracted the interest of Juventus Turin who he joined in 1940 after just one year with Bari. He would play for the Old Lady for five seasons. His most successful season came in the 1941–42 Serie A where he scored 15 goals for Juve being the highest foreigner goalscorer in the Seria in that particular season. Lushta made history as he won with Juventus Turin the 1941–42 Coppa Italia. Where he is known for his hattrick he scored against A.C. Milan in the second leg of the finals. Riza Lushta would be the first Albanian footballer to be a record goalscorer in the Coppa Italia with 8 goals in 6 matches.

Loro mostly played for Partizani Tirana in his footballing career, winning with them three times the Kategoria Superiore as well with Albania the 1946 Balkan Cup in home soil. He had a short spell in Italy with Lazio Rome where he scored three goals being the first Albanian footballer to play abroad in the Seria A.

Loro Boriçi captained the team in winning the 1946 Balkan Cup.

Panajot Pano is a well known football player in Albania. He spend most of his career with Partizani Tirana. Where he played for 15 years between 1960 and 1975 scoring 136 goals for them. He won with them the Albanian Superliga four times as well as winning the Albanian cup six times and one Balkans Cup title in 1970 his only international title with Partizani Tirana. He played for Albania 24 times between 1963 and 1973 where he is known for his goal against Denmark in the 1964 European Nations' Cup round of 16 second leg securing Albania's first ever win in a tournament.

Due to his skills and abilities, Pano earned the nickname "The little Puskás" by sports commentators. He is also well remembered by world known players such as Franz Beckenbauer, Willi Schulz as well as Fenerbahçe president of Albanian descent Myslym Bey praising him as a talented striker comparing him to Pelé and Eusébio.

"If Panajot Pano doesn't remember me, I remember him."

— Franz Beckenbauer, 1990

In November 2003 he was selected as the Golden Player by the Football Association of Albania as their most outstanding player of the past 50 years.

On 6 March 2009, Pano received the Honor of the Nation Decoration from the President of Albania, Bamir Topi. This was the first time in the history of Albania that a footballer was honored with the Honor of the Nation order.

In recent history Albania produced top talented players such as Lorik Cana he played for Paris Saint-Germain F.C. which who he won the Coupe de France in 2003–04 as well playing for their rivals Olympique de Marseille. He also played for Seria A side S.S. Lazio which who he won the 2012–13 Coppa Italia. Lorik Cana is the most capped player in the History off Albania with 93 games in total. He competed with Albania at the UEFA Euro 2016 held in France. Playing two out of their three matches in the Groupstage. After that he retired as a professional football player.

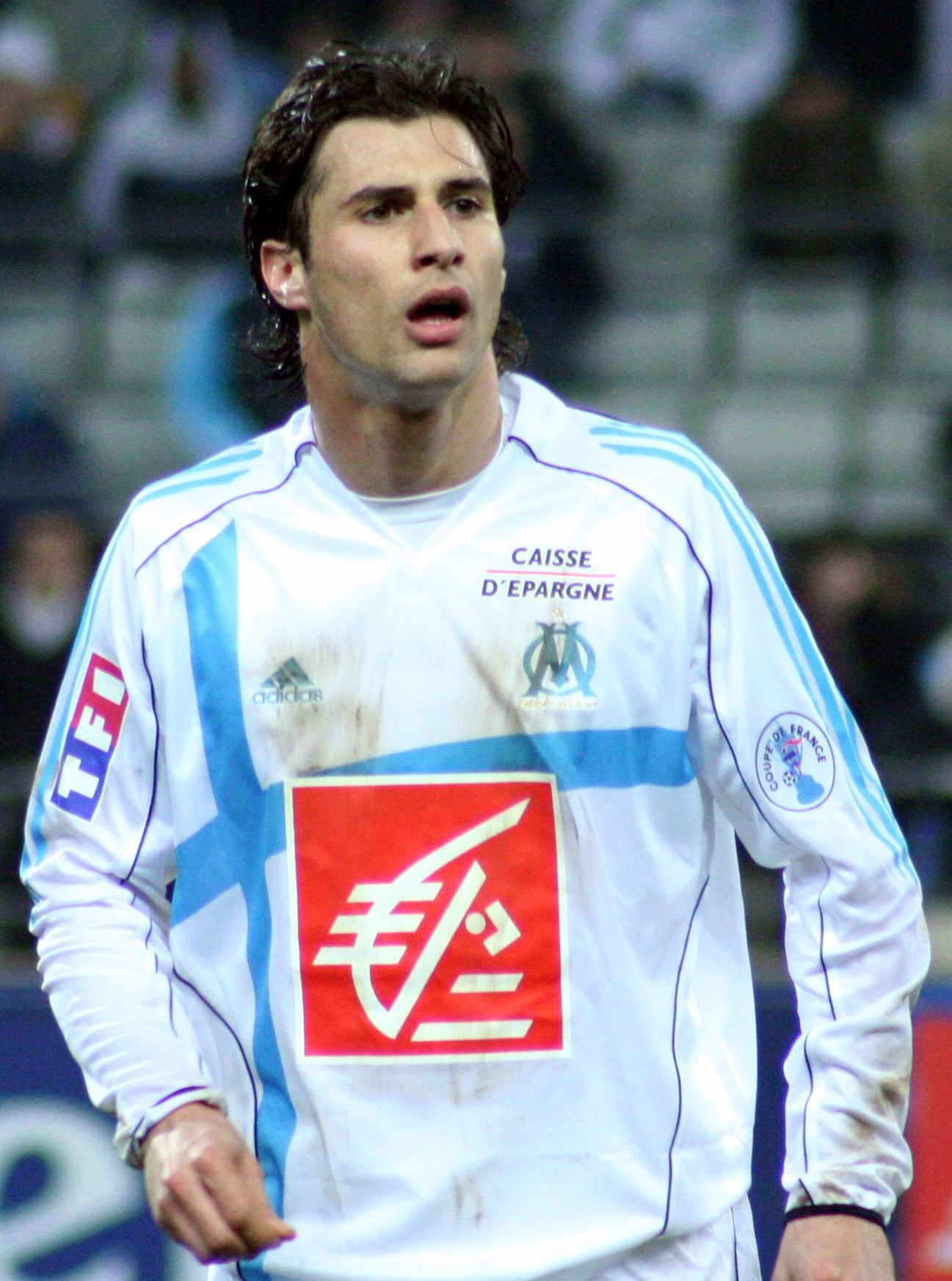
Lorik Cana is the most capped player in the history of the national team with 93 caps; he overtook Altin Lala in 2014 and is seen by many as the symbol of Albanians and the national team.

The most famous player at the moment is Thomas Strakosha, goalkeeper for Lazio in the Serie A winning with them two Coppa Italia in 2012–13 and 2018–19. He has won also two times the Supercoppa Italiana in 2017 and 2019 both against Juventus Turin. Elseid Hysaj who played in the past for S.S.C. Napoli which he won with them the Coppa Italia in 2019–20. He is playing right now for Lazio Rome. Berat Djimsiti is playing for Atalanta B.C.

== Supporters ==
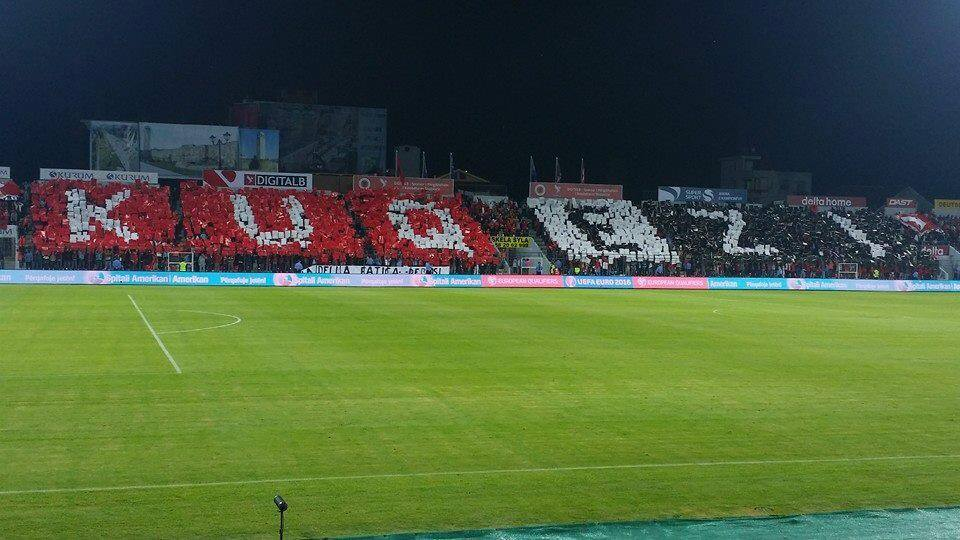
A choreography of Tifozat Kuq e Zi in the national team's first match at Elbasan Arena against Denmark in October 2014.

Tifozat Kuq e Zi (English: Red and Black Fans, also known as the Albania National Football Team Supporters Club) is a non-profit football supporters' association for the Albania national football team and various national team sportive activities. It was founded on 25 December 2003. In cooperation with FSHF, it organises trips for football fans to visit games, and develops and sells merchandise to support itself and fund sporting related projects.

Tifozat Kuq e Zi stands firm in the political view that Albanians should share only one national team and have continuous aspirations to join in one state (Një Komb, Një Kombëtare), i.e. unification of Albania, Kosovo, etc. In this sense, TKZ is joined by different supporters' associations throughout Albanian-speaking regions mainly in Kosovo (Shqiponjat of Peja, Kuqezinjet e Jakoves of Gjakova, Plisat of Prishtina, Torcida of Mitrovica, etc.), North Macedonia (Ballistët of Tetovë, Ilirët of Kumanovë, Shvercerat of Shkupi, etc.) and in Albania itself (Ultras Guerrils of Partizani Tirana, Tirona Fanatics of KF Tirana, Vllaznit Ultras of Vllaznia Shkodër, Ujqërit e Deborës of Skënderbeu Korçë, Shqiponjat of KF Besa Pejë and many other different Albanian fans).

The ongoing dispute between the Ministry of Culture, Youth and Sports and the Football Association of Albania has been seen as a political intrusion by FIFA and UEFA, which led to the banning of Albania from international sportive activities. FSHF president Armand Duka is highly unwanted by the TKZ who have numerously asked for his resignation believing he is responsible for internal corruption in the Albanian Football Association.

The TKZ have been praised by many different football players and managers, whom were not just Albanian. One example is with Switzerland's former coach, Ottmar Hitzfeld, who was astonished by how many Albanian fans turned up and how enthusiastic they were in 2014 FIFA World Cup qualifying match between Switzerland and Albania where the Swiss won 2–0 thanks to goals from Gökhan Inler and Kosovo-born Xherdan Shaqiri. He didn't believe that there was 12,000 Albanian fans in the stands which was more than how many Swiss fans turned up for the game. He stated that "Albanian fans are fantastic and the most passionate fans I have ever seen". During that campaign, TKZ attended all games Albania played apart from a match against Cyprus in Nicosia and were also large in numbers in the away games to Slovenia in Maribor and Norway in Oslo.

=== International football ===
==== Most popular national teams ====
As Albania qualifies not often for international tournaments (having never qualified for the FIFA World Cup and having qualified for the UEFA European Championship twice in history, failing to make it past the group stage on both occasions), in international tournaments where Albania is absent, many Albanians choose to support another national team.

Most supported national teams by Albanians, excluding Albania (2022)
Team	%
Argentina	10.7%
Brazil	27.6%
England	2.2%
France	4.0%
Germany	24.3%
Italy	14.0%
Netherlands	5.5%
Portugal	4.2%
Spain	3.9%
Other	3.5%

== Attendances ==
The average attendance per top-flight football league season and the club with the highest average attendance:

Season	League average	Best club	Best club average
2019–20	1,478	Tirana	4,934
2018–19	1,283	Partizani	2,986
2017–18	1,230	Skënderbeu	2,772
2016–17	1,795	Skënderbeu	2,658
2015–16	1,484	Partizani	3,232
2014–15	1,942	Partizani	3,578
2013–14	2,180	Skënderbeu	3,708
2012–13	1,504	Skënderbeu	3,862
2011–12	1,775	Skënderbeu	4,323
2010–11	2,349	Skënderbeu	6,738
2003–04	2,383	Vllaznia	4,255
2002–03	2,198	Vllaznia	5,431
2001–02	2,665	Vllaznia	5,454

== See also ==
- Sports in Albania
- Albanian Football Association
- List of stadiums in Albania
