= Kreshnik Çipi =

Albanian footballer and politician

Personal information
- Full name: Kreshnik Çipi
- Date of birth: 15 February 1958 (age 68)
- Place of birth: Vlorë, Albania
- Position: Defender

Youth career
- 1973–1977: Flamurtari

Senior career*
Years	Team	Apps	(Gls)
1977–1992	Flamurtari		

International career
1980–1992	Albania	7	(0)
- * Club domestic league appearances and goals

Kreshnik Çipi

Member of the Albanian parliament
- In office 2009–2013

Personal details
- Party: Democratic Party

Kreshnik Çipi (born 15 February 1958) is an Albanian retired footballer who played for Flamurtari and the Albania national team. He later became a member of the Assembly of the Republic of Albania for the Democratic Party of Albania.

== Football career ==
=== Club ===
Çipi started out as a winger, moved to fullback and ended up as a central defender. He spent his entire playing career with hometown club Flamurtari in the 1980s, captaining the team during the club's golden years involving fellow international players like Sokol Kushta, Rrapo Taho, Petro Ruçi, Alfred Ferko and Alfred Zijai.

=== International ===
He made his debut for Albania in an October 1980 FIFA World Cup qualification match against Bulgaria and earned a total of 7 caps, scoring no goals. His final international was an April 1992 FIFA World Cup qualification match against Spain.

=== Honours ===
- Albanian Superliga: 1

1991

- Albanian Cup: 2

1985, 1988

== Personal life ==
His nephew Geri also played for Flamurtari and the national team.
