= Rrapo Taho =

Albanian footballer

Personal information
- Full name: Rrapo Taho
- Date of birth: 17 August 1959 (age 67)
- Place of birth: Vlorë, Albania
- Position: Defender

Youth career
- 1975–1980: Flamurtari

Senior career*
Years	Team	Apps	(Gls)
1980–1993	Flamurtari		

International career
1986–1993	Albania	11	(0)
- * Club domestic league appearances and goals

Rrapo Taho (born 17 August 1959) is an Albanian retired footballer who played as a central defender.

== Club career ==
Taho spent his entire career with hometown club Flamurtari during the 1970s and 1980s, during the club's golden years alongside fellow international players like Sokol Kushta, Kreshnik Çipi, Petro Ruçi, Alfred Ferko and Alfred Zijai.

== International career ==
He made his debut for Albania in an October 1986 European Championship qualification match against Austria and earned a total of 11 caps, scoring no goals. His final international was an April 1993 FIFA World Cup qualification match against Lithuania.

== Personal life ==
His son, Rexhino Taho is also a footballer, having also played for Flamurtari.

== Honours ==
- Albanian Superliga: 1

1991

- Albanian Cup: 2

1985, 1988
