= 1986–87 Albanian Cup =

Kupa e Shqipërisë

Tournament details
- Country: Albania

Final positions
- Champions: Vllaznia
- Runners-up: Flamurtari

1986–87 Albanian Cup (Albanian: Kupa e Shqipërisë) was the thirty-fifth season of Albania's annual cup competition. It began in August 1986 with the First Round and ended in May 1987 with the Final matches. The winners of the competition qualified for the 1987-88 first round of the UEFA Europa League. 17 Nëntori were the defending champions, having won their seventh Albanian Cup last season. The cup was won by Vllaznia.

The rounds were played in a two-legged format similar to those of European competitions. If the aggregated score was tied after both games, the team with the higher number of away goals advanced. If the number of away goals was equal in both games, the match was decided by extra time and a penalty shootout, if necessary.

== First round ==
Games were played in August 1986.

Team 1	Agg.	Team 2	1st leg	2nd leg
Ylli i Kuq	2–2 (3–2 p)	Tomori	2–0	0–2
Bistrica	1–4	Besëlidhja	1–0	0–4
5 Shtatori	2–5	Flamurtari	2–3	0–2
Studenti	2–5	Luftëtari	0–1	2–4
Minatori Tepelena	2–5	Naftëtari	2–1	0–4
Butrinti	2–4	Labinoti	1–0	1–4
Vetëtima	1–4	Apolonia	1–0	0–4
Shkumbini	0–1	Partizani	0–0	0–1
31 Korriku	2–3	Lokomotiva Durrës	2–1	0–2
Dajti	1–8	Dinamo Tirana	0–5	1–3
Sopoti	2–0	Erzeni	1–0	1–0
Përparimi	1–3	Skënderbeu	1–0	0–3
Kastrioti	0–3	Vllaznia	0–0	0–3
24 Maji	2–0	Traktori	2–0	0–0
Korabi	3–1	Besa	2–0	1–1
Ballshi i Ri	0–4	17 Nëntori	0–0	0–4

== Second round ==
Games were played in January 1987.

Team 1	Agg.	Team 2	1st leg	2nd leg
Besëlidhja	1–2	Vllaznia	1–0	0–2
Ylli i Kuq	1–2	Lokomotiva Durrës	1–0	0–2
Labinoti	3–3 (a)	17 Nëntori	2–2	1–1
Naftëtari	2–6	Partizani	1–1	1–5
Sopoti	2–7	Flamurtari	1–1	1–6
Dinamo Tirana	3–2	Skënderbeu	2–1	1–1
Korabi	1–2	Luftëtari	1–0	0–2
24 Maji	2–4	Apolonia	0–2	2–2

== Quarter-finals ==
In this round entered the 8 winners from the previous round. Games were played in February 1987.

Team 1	Agg.	Team 2	1st leg	2nd leg
Vllaznia	2–1	17 Nëntori	2–0	0–1
Partizani	1–0	Lokomotiva Durrës	1–0	0–0
Luftëtari	4–3	Dinamo Tirana	4–2	0–1
Apolonia	1–2	Flamurtari	0–1	1–1

== Semi-finals ==
In this round entered the four winners from the previous round. Games were played in April 2000.

Team 1	Agg.	Team 2	1st leg	2nd leg
Vllaznia	5–4	Partizani	3–2	2–2
Luftëtari	1–1 (a)	Flamurtari	1–1	0–0

== Finals ==
In this round entered the two winners from the previous round. Games were played in May 1987.

Team 1	Agg.	Team 2	1st leg	2nd leg
Vllaznia	4–3	Flamurtari	3–0	1–3

=== First leg ===
7 June 1987

Vllaznia	3–0	Flamurtari
Rragami 69'; Pashaj 83'; Briza 88'

Vojo Kushi Stadium, Shkodër
Attendance: 15,000
Referee: Namik Jareci

=== Second leg ===
14 June 1987

Flamurtari	3–1	Vllaznia
Ruci 16', 62'; Bubeqi 53'		Rragami 78'

Flamurtari Stadium, Vlorë
Attendance: 11,000
Referee: Plarent Kotherja
