= Anesti Arapi =

Albanian footballer

Personal information
- Date of birth: 6 July 1963 (age 63)
- Place of birth: Albania
- Height: 1.86 m (6 ft 1 in)
- Position: Goalkeeper

Senior career*
Years	Team	Apps	(Gls)
1986–1991	Flamurtari		
1991–1992	Iraklis	3	(0)
1992–1997	Flamurtari	95	(0)

International career
1990	Albania	2	(0)
- * Club domestic league appearances and goals

Anesti Arapi (born 6 July 1963) is an Albanian retired footballer, who played the majority of his career as a goalkeeper for Flamurtari Vlorë. He also played for the Albania national team.

== Club career ==
A soon as Albanians were free to leave the country after the end of the communist era, Arapi moved abroad to play alongside Flamurtari teammate and compatriot Sokol Kushta in neighboring Greece for Iraklis. He returned to Flamurtari however after just one season in Saloniki.

=== UEFA Cup matches against Barcelona ===
As Flamurtari's reserve goalkeeper, Arapi was deemed too young and inexperienced to play in the 1986–87 UEFA Cup against Spanish giants FC Barcelona after their first goalkeeper Luan Birçe was not allowed to travel so the football federation ordered Lokomotiva Durrës keeper Artur Lekbello to stand in at the club for a season. Arapi did however play when they met Barcelona again in the 1987–88 UEFA Cup.

== International career ==
He made his debut for Albania in a November 1990 European Championship qualification match against France and earned his second and final cap in a 0–9 defeat by Spain in December in the same year.

== Honours ==
- Albanian Superliga: 1

1991
