= Flamurtari FC B =

Albanian football club

- Full name: Flamurtari Football Club B
- Owner: Bashkia Vlorë, TRK
- President: Sinan Idrizi
Home colours	Away colours

Flamurtari FC B is an Albanian football club based in the city of Vlorë. It's a B team of Flamurtari Vlorë. The team is currently not competing in the any football league.
