= 1985–86 Albanian Cup =

Kupa e Shqipërisë

Tournament details
- Country: Albania

Final positions
- Champions: 17 Nëntori
- Runners-up: Vllaznia

1985–86 Albanian Cup (Albanian: Kupa e Shqipërisë) was the thirty-fourth season of Albania's annual cup competition. It began in August 1985 with the First Round and ended in May 1986 with the Final match. The winners of the competition qualified for the 1986-87 first round of the UEFA Cup. Flamurtari were the defending champions, having won their first Albanian Cup last season. The cup was won by 17 Nëntori.

The rounds were played in a two-legged format similar to those of European competitions. If the aggregated score was tied after both games, the team with the higher number of away goals advanced. If the number of away goals was equal in both games, the match was decided by extra time and a penalty shootout, if necessary.

== First round ==
Games were played on August & September 1985. Flamurtari were received a bye as a cup holders.

Team 1	Agg.	Team 2	1st leg	2nd leg
5 Shtatori	4–4 (a)	Lokomotiva Durrës	3–2	1–2
Minatori Tepelena	1–4	Luftëtari	0–3	1–1
24 Maji	1–3	Tomori	1–0	0–3
Shkumbini	3–4	Apolonia	1–1	2–3
Kastrioti	0–2	Partizani	0–0	0–2
Sopoti	2–2	Traktori	2–1	0–1
Vetëtima	2–3	Naftëtari	2–0	0–3
Butrinti	3–4	Labinoti	2–1	1–3
31 Korriku	2–3	Besëlidhja	1–1	1–2
Erzeni	3–1	Shkëndija Tirana	1–0	2–1
Korabi	3–4	Skënderbeu	3–0	0–4
Ylli i Kuq	1–1 (a)	Besa	0–0	1–1
Bistrica	4–6	Dinamo Tirana	2–2	2–4
Turbina	1–5	17 Nëntori	1–1	0–4
Përparimi	2–10	Vllaznia	2–3	0–7
Flamurtari	bye			

== Second round ==
All sixteen teams of the 1984–85 Superliga and First Division entered in this round. First and second legs were played in January 1986.

Team 1	Agg.	Team 2	1st leg	2nd leg
Labinoti	2–3	17 Nëntori	2–0	0–3
Partizani	3–3 (5–4 p)	Dinamo Tirana	2–1	1–2
Ylli i Kuq	3–9	Vllaznia	3–2	0–7
Skënderbeu	2–1	Luftëtari	1–0	1–1
Naftëtari	2–4	Tomori	1–3	1–1
Besëlidhja	2–4	Apolonia	1–0	1–4
Erzeni	0–0 (4–1 p)	Lokomotiva Durrës	0–0	0–0
Traktori	2–6	Flamurtari	1–2	1–4

== Quarter-finals ==
In this round entered the 8 winners from the previous round.

Team 1	Agg.	Team 2	1st leg	2nd leg
Partizani	2–1	Flamurtari	0–1	2–0
Skënderbeu	1–1 (a)	Vllaznia	1–1	0–0
Erzeni	3–5	Tomori	2–1	1–4
Apolonia	3–5	17 Nëntori	1–1	2–4

== Semi-finals ==
In this round entered the four winners from the previous round.

Team 1	Agg.	Team 2	1st leg	2nd leg
17 Nëntori	2–1	Partizani	2–1	0–0
Vllaznia	4–2	Tomori	4–1	0–1

== Final ==
1 June 1986

17 Nëntori	3–1	Vllaznia
Kola 21', 54' (pen.); Muça 77'		Jera 65'

Qemal Stafa Stadium, Tirana
Attendance: 10,000
Referee: Dhori Prifti
