= Dritan =

- Gender: Male

Origin
- Meaning: light
- Region of origin: Albania, Kosovo

Other names
- Related names: Driton

Dritan (also spelled Driton) is an Albanian masculine given name, which is derived from the Albanian word dritë, meaning "light". The name may refer to:

- Dritan Abazović (born 1985), Albanian-Montenegrin politician
- Dritan Babamusta (born 1981), Albanian football player
- Dritan Baholli (born 1974), Albanian football player and coach
- Dritan Dajti (born 1981), Albanian criminal
- Dritan Hoxha (1968–2008), Albanian businessman
- Dritan Mehmeti (born 1980), Albanian football player
- Dritan Resuli (born 1976), Albanian football manager
- Dritan Smajli (born 1985), Albanian football player
- Dritan Stafsula (born 1981), Albanian football player
- Driton Camaj (born 1997), Albanian-Montenegrin football player
- Driton Dovolani (born 1973), Albanian-American dancer
- Driton Selmanaj (born 1979), Kosovo-Albanian politician
