= Ferko =

Ferko is a surname. Notable people with the surname include:

- Alfred Ferko (born 1964), Albanian football player and coach
- Frank Ferko (born 1950), American composer
