= Rragami =

Rragami is a surname of Albanian origin. Notable people with the surname include:

- Ferid Rragami (born 1957), Albanian footballer
- Ramazan Rragami (1944–2022), Albanian footballer and coach
