= Dritan Resuli =

Albanian footballer and manager

Personal information
- Full name: Dritan Resuli
- Date of birth: 25 April 1976 (age 50)
- Place of birth: Vlorë, PSR Albania
- Position: Defender

Senior career*
Years	Team	Apps	(Gls)
1995–2004	Flamurtari		
2004–2005	Egnatia		

Managerial career
- 2010–2011: Himara
- 2014–2015: Flamuartari U19
- 2015–2016: Flamuartari U17
- 2016–2020: Flamuartari U19
- 2020: Flamurtari (caretaker)
- 2020–2022: Flamurtari
- 2023–: Flamurtari
- * Club domestic league appearances and goals

Dritan Resuli (born 25 April 1976) is an Albanian football manager and former player.
