= Marcello Troisi =

Brazilian footballer

Personal information
- Full name: Marcello Troisi Moreira
- Date of birth: 9 April 1976 (age 50)
- Place of birth: Santos, São Paulo, Brazil
- Height: 1.82 m (6 ft 0 in)
- Position: Striker

Youth career
- 1988–1993: Santos

Senior career*
Years	Team	Apps	(Gls)
1994–1995	Santos		
1996	Corinthians		
1997	Santo André		
1997–1999	Edessaikos		
1999	AEL		
2000	PAOK		
2001	Kilkisiakos		
2002	Prudentópolis		
2002	União de Rondonópolis		
2003	Levadiakos		
2004	Oriente Petrolero		
2004	Sampaio Corrêa		
2004	Al-Hait		
2005	Matonense		
2005	Piauí		
2006	Democrata		
2007	Piauí		
2007	Imperatriz		
2008	Remo		
2008	São Bernardo		
2009	Parnahyba		

Managerial career
- 2012: Cabofriense
- 2013: Piauí (General manager)
- 2014: Partizani (General manager)
- 2015: Kukësi
- 2016: Skënderbeu (Scout)
- 2016: Laçi
- 2017: Bylis
- 2017: Kallithea
- 2018: Bylis
- 2018: AEL U-20
- 2018–2019: Apollon Larissa
- 2019: Iraklis
- 2019: Ialysos
- 2020: Flamurtari
- 2020: Turbina
- 2022–2023: Flamurtari
- 2026: Ionikos
- * Club domestic league appearances and goals

Marcello Troisi Moreira (born 9 March 1976) is a Brazilian retired footballer who played as a striker, who most recently managed Ionikos.

== Career ==
After playing for Santos, Corinthians and Remo in his home country, Troisi moved abroad where he played in Greece.
