= Sokol Kushta =

Albanian association football player (born 1964)

Personal information
- Full name: Sokol Kushta
- Date of birth: 17 April 1964 (age 62)
- Place of birth: Vlorë, PR Albania
- Position: Striker

Senior career*
Years	Team	Apps	(Gls)
1981–1984	Flamurtari	40	(14)
1984–1987	Partizani	70	(31)
1987–1991	Flamurtari	81	(41)
1991–1993	Iraklis Thessaloniki	36	(2)
1993–1994	Apollon Kalamaria	24	(10)
1994–1995	Olympiakos Nicosia	26	(13)
1995–1996	Ethnikos Achna	19	(3)
Total		296	(114)

International career^{‡}
1987–1996	Albania	31	(10)

Managerial career
- 2000–2001: Flamurtari
- * Club domestic league appearances and goals as of October 7, 2009 ‡ National team caps and goals as of October 7, 2009

Sokol Kushta (born 17 April 1964) is an Albanian retired association football player, who was arguably one of his country's best players in the latter half of the 1980s and the early 1990s and one of the first to be allowed by the communist party to play abroad.

Kushta was a striker and was ranked 30th in the 1987 European Footballer of the Year, matching in the ranking players such as Alessandro Altobelli, Glenn Hoddle, and Rudi Völler.

== Club career ==
Born in Vlorë, Kushta spent the large part of his Albanian league career with hometown club Flamurtari during the 1980s, the club's golden years alongside fellow international players like Alfred Zijai, Kreshnik Çipi, Petro Ruçi, Alfred Ferko and Rrapo Taho. In the 1987–88 season, he and his Flamurtari teammates managed to knock out Partizan Belgrade and Wismut Aue, before losing for a second successive year to Spanish giants FC Barcelona in the round of 16 in the UEFA Cup. He also had three seasons with army club Partizani Tirana.

One of the most high-profile Albanian players at the time, Kushta moved abroad following the fall of communism and joined Greek side Iraklis alongside fellow international and Flamurtari goalkeeper Anesti Arapi and later played for Apollon Kalamarias and in Cyprus for Ethnikos Achnas and Olympiakos Nicosia.

Kushta is the current joint-top goalscorer of Albanian Supercup along with KF Tirana's Mahir Halili, having scored a hat-trick in the 1990 edition against Dinamo Tirana.

== International career ==
Kushta made his debut for Albania in a March 1987 European Championship qualification match away at Romania and earned a total of 31 caps, scoring a then national record 10 goals. His final international was an October 1996 FIFA World Cup qualification match against Portugal.

== Honours ==
=== Partizani ===
- Albanian Superliga: 1986–87

=== Flamurtari ===
- Albanian Superliga: 1990–91
