= Eqerem Memushi =

Albanian footballer and manager

Personal information
- Date of birth: 7 May 1965 (age 61)
- Place of birth: Vlorë, PR Albania
- Position: Defender

Team information
- Current team: Flamurtari (manager)

Youth career
- –1986: Flamurtari Vlorë

Senior career*
Years	Team	Apps	(Gls)
1986–1987	Partizani Tirana		
1987–1996	Flamurtari		

International career
1985–1987	Albania U21	4	(0)
1990–1991	Albania	4	(0)

Managerial career
- 2006: Flamurtari
- 2007–2008: Flamurtari
- 2009: Flamurtari
- 2010–2011: Tomori
- 2011: Apolonia
- 2011: Vlora
- 2011–2012: Tomori
- 2012–2014: Naftëtari
- 2014: Tomori
- 2016–2017: Bylis
- 2017–2020: Albania U15
- 2019–2020: Oriku
- 2024–: Flamurtari
- * Club domestic league appearances and goals

Eqerem Memushi (born 7 May 1965) is an Albanian football manager and a former player who is the manager of Flamurtari. During his playing career he was a defender and spent most of his career playing for his hometown club Flamurtari Vlorë. He also represented the Albania national team in 1990–1991, playing 4 matches.

== Playing career ==
=== Club ===
Memushi won a league title with army club Partizani Tirana in 1987, before returning to his hometown club Flamurtari with whom he won another in 1991. He played for Flamurtari in the 1987–88 UEFA Cup against Spanish giants FC Barcelona.

=== International ===
He made his debut for Albania in a September 1990 friendly match against Greece and earned a total of 4 caps, scoring no goals. His final international was another friendly against Greece in September 1991.

== Managerial career ==
On 27 January 2017 Memushi was named as the Albania national under-15 football team manager to take vacant place left by departed Alessandro Recenti. Following a 3-months selection in some zones around Albania, on 28 April 2017 an under-15 squad was contoured by Memushi with 20 players which participated in a 5 days gathering between 9–13 May 2017. A week after, Memushi started another gathering in Durrës, Albania between dates 17–19 May 2017 with a squad which contained 21 players. Memushi made his first gathering to play his first match as the under-15 head coach in September 2017 for the double friendly matches against Montenegro U15 on 28 & 30 September 2017. Memushi lost the first match at Reshit Rusi Stadium, Shkodër, Albania 0–4.

== Career statistics ==
=== International ===
As of 4 September 1991

Albania national team
Year	Apps	Goals
1990	1	0
1991	3	0
Total	4	0

=== Honours ===
- Albanian Superliga: 2

1987, 1991

- Albanian Cup: 1

1988
