= Gerd Haxhiu =

Albanian football coach (born 1972)

Personal information
- Full name: Gerd Haxhiu
- Date of birth: 1 October 1972 (age 54)
- Place of birth: Vlorë, PR Albania

Managerial career
- Years: Team
- 2007: Flamurtari
- 2007–2008: Apolonia
- 2008: Ibar
- 2009: Bylis
- 2009: Skënderbeu
- 2010: Partizani
- 2010–2011: Besa
- 2016: Luftëtari
- 2016–2017: Korabi
- 2026–: Oriku

Gerd Haxhiu (born 11 October 1972) is an Albanian football coach who has managed Apolonia Fier, Bylis Ballsh, Skënderbeu Korçë, Besa Kavajë.
