= Ferid Rragami =

Albanian footballer

Personal information
- Full name: Ferid Rragami
- Date of birth: 1 June 1957 (age 69)
- Place of birth: Albania
- Position: Midfielder

Youth career
- 1972–1974: Shkëndija Tiranë

Senior career*
Years	Team	Apps	(Gls)
1974–1976	Shkëndija		
1976–1978	Vllaznia		
1978–1982	Partizani		
1982–1988	Vllaznia		

International career
1977	Albania U23	1	(0)
1980–1985	Albania	14	(0)
- * Club domestic league appearances and goals

Ferid Rragami (born 1 June 1957), is an Albanian retired footballer.

== Club career ==
Rragami played for Shkëndija Tiranë, Vllaznia Shkodër and Partizani Tirana between 1972 and 1988, winning three league titles and 2 domestic cups.

=== Suspension ===
In November 1987, Rragami's playing career was more or less ended by the communist regime, who suspended him for two years for his role in the defection of Vllaznia players Lulëzim Bërshemi and Arvid Hoxha in Helsinki after a European tie with Finnish side Rovaniemi PS. He was punished to forced labour in Pult alongside team manager Bahri Aqemi, head coach Astrit Hafizi and club doctor Zyhdi Çoba.

== International career ==
He made his debut for Albania in a September 1980 World Cup qualification match against Finland in Tirana and earned a total of 14 caps, scoring no goals. His final international was a March 1985 friendly match against Turkey.

== Honours ==
- Albanian Superliga: 3

1979, 1981, 1983

- Albanian Cup: 2

1980, 1987
