= Sinan Idrizi =

Albanian businessman (born 1968)

- Born: Sinan Idrizi; July 20, 1968 (age 58); Vlorë, Albania
- Education: Faculty of Geology and Mining
- Alma mater: Polytechnic University of Tirana
- Occupation: Businessman
- Known for: Owner of MDN Investment; Shareholder of Air Albania; President of Flamurtari FC

Sinan Idrizi (born 20 July 1968) is an Albanian businessman who is the major shareholder of Air Albania and is also the president of Albanian football club Flamurtari FC. He first started business in 1993, trading goods from Turkey. In 2014 he became the president of Flamurtari FC who won the Albanian Cup (2013–2014). In 2018 he became the shareholder of Air Albania.

== Early life ==
Idrizi was born in Vlorë to a Cham father and a Lab mother. He studied at the Faculty of Geology and Mining at the Polytechnic University of Tirana in the late 1980s. Idrizi started his first businesses between 1993 and 1994, importing goods from Turkey.

== Controversies ==
Air Albania under Idrizi's influence has faced serious criticism due to systematic mismanagement, financial intransparency, and repeated failures to pay suppliers, including catering and aircraft leasing companies. Court rulings confirmed several unpaid obligations, such as unpaid catering bills totaling millions of euros. Observers and media reports suggest that many of these financial problems arose not merely from incompetence but from decisions made under Idrizi's direction that prioritized other interests over the airline's financial health, contributing directly to the airline's collapse. These issues have prompted public debate about the accountability of major shareholders and the potential for deliberate mismanagement in state-backed private ventures.

== Career ==
Idrizi became widely known as a major shareholder in Air Albania, the national airline of Albania, which was established in 2018 as a joint venture between Turkish Airlines (49%), MDN Investment (41%), and the Albanian government (10%). Although Idrizi was not the CEO, as the principal shareholder he held significant influence over the airline's operations and financial decisions. During his tenure, Air Albania faced financial difficulties, including unpaid debts to suppliers and leasing companies. Reports in Albanian media and court documents indicate that the airline accumulated substantial debts and failed to pay some of its contractors, leading to lawsuits and public criticism. Observers have described Idrizi as having major control over financial and operational decisions, contributing to questions about the management and transparency of the airline.
