= Sunday League Tiranë =

Albanian football league

- Founded: 2022
- First season: 2022
- Country: Albania
- Confederation: UEFA
- Leagues: 2
- Level on pyramid: 5
- Current champions: Vila-L (1st title) (2023–24)
- Website: https://fshf.org/fshf-sunday-league-tirane/

Sunday League Tiranë is the fifth and highest level of amateur football in Albania. In the 2023–24 season, 34 teams are participating. Matches are mostly played at the National Sports Centre in Kamëz.

== Group A Clubs (2023–24) ==
Team	Location
ATS	Tirana
Barrikada	Tirana
Dymbedhjeta	Tirana
ELSO	Tirana
Ferraj	Tirana
Hidro Alfa	Tirana
Illyrian Eagles	Tirana
Immi	Tirana
Legjendat 9x9	Tirana
Luminesen	Tirana
MD	Tirana
Panthers Shkodër	Tirana
Pasioni	Tirana
PRIMO	Tirana
Raiffeisen Bank	Tirana
Vater	Tirana
Vila-L	Tirana

== Group B Clubs (2023–24) ==
Team	Location
Al-Ar	Tirana
Albamer	Tirana
Antigonean	Tirana
Big-Bite	Tirana
Coca-Cola Tepelena	Tirana
Confucius	Tirana
Dajti	Tirana
Friends Team	Tirana
Futura Dent	Tirana
Gaia Triumph	Tirana
Jata Market	Tirana
JU-AR Plast	Tirana
Kastriotët	Tirana
Musa	Tirana
North Gate	Tirana
Parku	Tirana
Roamel	Tirana
