= Agim Bubeqi =

Albanian footballer (1963–2026)

Personal information
- Date of birth: 7 April 1963
- Place of birth: Vlorë, Albania
- Date of death: August 2026 (aged 63)
- Position: Forward

Senior career*
Years	Team	Apps	(Gls)
1987–2003	Flamurtari Vlorë		

International career
1987–1989	Albania	6	(0)
- * Club domestic league appearances and goals

Agim Bubeqi (7 April 1963 – 13 August 2026) was an Albanian footballer who played as a forward, spending his entire professional career with Flamurtari Vlorë and was played for them during the club's Golden Era in the 1980s. He scored the winning goal in the 1988 Albanian Cup Final.

Bubeqi also made six appearances for the Albania national team.

== International career ==
Bubeqi made his debut for Albania in an April 1987 Euro Championship qualification match against Austria and earned a total of 6 caps, scoring no goals.

His final international was a November 1989 FIFA World Cup qualification match against Poland.

== Personal life and death ==
Bubeqi was arrested by police in Vlorë on 16 July 2009 after stabbing a young man to death in front of a bar and injuring four others. It was reported Bubeqi suffered from mental problems after being involved in a car collision in August the year before, and that he thought the victims were making fun of him.

Bubeqi's death at the age of 63 was announced on 13 August 2026; his body was found in his flat after his neighbours had not seen him in several days.

== Honours ==
Flamurtari Vlorë

- Albanian Superliga: 1991
- Albanian Cup: 1988
