= Agron Sulaj =

Albanian footballer

Personal information
- Full name: Agron Feim Sulaj
- Date of birth: 26 November 1952
- Place of birth: Vlorë, Albania
- Date of death: 8 April 1996 (aged 43)
- Position: Defender

Senior career*
Years	Team	Apps	(Gls)
197?–1974	Shkëndija Tiranë		
1974–1979	Flamurtari		

Managerial career
- 1979–1983: Flamurtari
- 1985–1987: Albania
- 1990: Albania
- 1991–1992: Potenza
- * Club domestic league appearances and goals

Agron Sulaj (26 November 1952 – 8 April 1996) was an Albanian footballer and from 1985 until 1987 and for a short time again in 1990 coach of the Albania national team.

== Managerial career ==
Born in Vlorë, Sulaj's playing career was cut short by injury at 27 and he became the youngest coach of hometown club Flamurtari Vlorë.
