= Vasil Ruci =

Albanian footballer

Personal information
- Full name: Vasil Ruci
- Date of birth: 17 February 1958 (age 68)
- Place of birth: Vlorë, PR Albania
- Height: 1.74 m (5 ft 9 in)
- Position: Striker

Youth career
- –1976: Flamurtari Vlorë

Senior career*
Years	Team	Apps	(Gls)
1976–1993	Flamurtari Vlorë	304	(93)

Managerial career
- 1998–1999: Flamurtari
- 2006–2007: Flamurtari
- 2007–2008: Turbina Cërrik
- 2009–2010: Himara
- 2011–2012: Vlora
- * Club domestic league appearances and goals

Vasil Ruci (born 17 February 1958) is an Albanian retired football player and coach from Vlorë who spent his entire career with Flamurtari Vlorë between 1976 and 1993. He is most noted for being an important figure in the club's famous 1986–87 UEFA Cup and 1987–88 UEFA Cup runs.

== Club career ==
He is a one-club man, having spent the entirety of his playing career at Flamurtari Vlorë, where he scored 93 league goals between 1976 and 1993, making him the current 16th top goalscorer in Albanian history. He made his debut for Flamurtari under coach Bejkush Birçe in 1976 against Besa Kavajë and won a 1991 league medal with them, despite Ruci being out injured for the season. He twice topped the Albanian league's goalscoring charts in 1982 and 1984.

He put Flamurtari 1–0 up against Spanish giants FC Barcelona in the famous 1–1 UEFA Cup draw in Vlora on 16 September 1986 with Barcelona qualifying for the next round on away goals two weeks later. He also scored a consolation goal in the 4–1 loss at Barcelona on 25 November 1987, the second successive season the clubs met each other in the UEFA Cup.

== Honours ==
- Albanian Superliga: 1

1991

- Albanian Cup: 2

1985, 1988

== See also ==
- List of one-club men in football
