= Petro Ruçi =

Albanian footballer

Petro Ruci
Personal information
- Date of birth: 3 March 1957
- Place of birth: Vlorë, Albania
- Date of death: 2 July 2009 (aged 52)
- Place of death: Athens, Greece
- Position: Defender

Youth career
- Flamurtari

Senior career*
Years	Team	Apps	(Gls)
1975–	Flamurtari		
1982–1984	Dinamo Tirana		
1984–1989	Flamurtari		

International career
1982–1983	Albania	8	(0)
- * Club domestic league appearances and goals

Petro Ruci (3 March 1957 – 2 July 2009) was an Albanian footballer who played as a defender for Flamurtari, Dinamo Tirana and the Albania national team.

== Club career ==
Ruci had a spell at Dinamo Tirana and was part of Flamurtari's golden team of the mid-1980s who played Spanish giants FC Barcelona in two successive UEFA Cup seasons.

== International career ==
He made his debut for Albania in a September 1982 European Championship qualification match against Austria and earned a total of 8 caps, scoring no goals. His final international was a November 1983 European Championship qualification match against West Germany.

== Death ==
Ruci died of a long illness in July 2009 in Athens, Greece, where he was scouting youth players.

== Honours ==
- Albanian Cup: 2

1985, 1988
