= Alfred Ferko =

Albanian footballer and coach (born 1964)

Personal information
- Full name: Alfred Ferko
- Date of birth: 15 October 1964 (age 62)
- Place of birth: Vlorë, PR Albania
- Height: 1.82 m (5 ft 11 1/2 in)
- Position: Midfielder

Senior career*
Years	Team	Apps	(Gls)
1983–1984	Partizani Tirana		
1984–1989	Flamurtari		
1989–1991	Dinamo Tirana		
1991–1994	Panachaiki	77	(8)

International career
1986–1992	Albania	9	(0)

Managerial career
- 2003–2004: Flamurtari
- 2004–2005: Egnatia
- 2005: Shkumbini
- 2006: Teuta
- * Club domestic league appearances and goals

Alfred Ferko (born 15 October 1964) is a former Albanian footballer who played as a midfielder for the Albania national team. After retiring as a player, he became a coach.

== Club career ==
As soon as Albanians were free to leave the country after the end of the communist era, Ferko moved abroad to play alongside compatriot Roland Iljadhi in neighboring Greece for Panachaiki Patras.

== International career ==
He made his debut for Albania in an October 1986 European Championship qualification match against Austria and earned a total of 9 caps, scoring no goals.

His final international was a January 1992 friendly match against Greece.

== Honours ==
- Albanian Superliga: 1

1990
