= 1984–85 Albanian Cup =

Kupa e Shqipërisë

Tournament details
- Country: Albania

Final positions
- Champions: Flamurtari
- Runners-up: Partizani

1984–85 Albanian Cup (Albanian: Kupa e Shqipërisë) was the thirty-third season of Albania's annual cup competition. It began in August 1984 with the First Round and ended in February 1985 with the Final match. The winners of the competition qualified for the 1985-86 first round of the UEFA Europa League. 17 Nëntori were the defending champions, having won their sixth Albanian Cup last season. The cup was won by Flamurtari.

The rounds were played in a two-legged format similar to those of European competitions. If the aggregated score was tied after both games, the team with the higher number of away goals advanced. If the number of away goals was equal in both games, the match was decided by extra time and a penalty shootout, if necessary.

== First round ==
Games were played in August 1984*

- Results unknown.

== Second round ==
Games were played in January 1985*

Team 1	Agg.	Team 2	1st leg	2nd leg
Shkëndija Tiranë	3–4	17 Nëntori	2–2	1–2
Besëlidhja	1–2	Lokomotiva Durrës	1–1	0–1
Labinoti	1–1 (3–4 p)	Partizani	1–0	0–1
Skënderbeu	1–0	Tomori	1–0	0–0
Apolonia	3–3 (4–3 p)	Luftëtari	2–1	1–2
Besa	1–4	Flamurtari	0–1	1–3
Naftëtari	1–11	Dinamo Tirana	1–3	0–8
Traktori	1–5	Vllaznia	1–3	0–2

== Quarter-finals ==
In this round entered the 8 winners from the previous round. Games were played in February 1985.

Team 1	Agg.	Team 2	1st leg	2nd leg
Skënderbeu	0–3	Partizani	0–0	0–3
Lokomotiva Durrës	0–4	17 Nëntori	0–1	0–3
Apolonia	1–1 (a)	Flamurtari	1–1	0–0
Dinamo Tirana	2–2 (3–4 p)	Vllaznia	2–0	0–2

== Semi-finals ==
In this round entered the four winners from the previous round. Games were played in April 1985.

Team 1	Agg.	Team 2	1st leg	2nd leg
Partizani	2–0	17 Nëntori	0–0	2–0
Flamurtari	2–2 (a)	Vllaznia	1–0	1–2

== Final ==
8 February 1985

Flamurtari	2–1	Partizani
Ruci 32'; Bubeqi 49'		Hametaj 41'

Ruzhdi Bizhuta Stadium, Elbasan
Attendance: 17,000
Referee: Dhori Prifti
