= 1987–88 Albanian Cup =

Kupa e Shqipërisë

Tournament details
- Country: Albania

Final positions
- Champions: Flamurtari
- Runners-up: Partizani

1987–88 Albanian Cup (Albanian: Kupa e Shqipërisë) was the thirty-sixth season of Albania's annual cup competition. It began in August 1987 with the First Round and ended in May 1988 with the Final match. The winners of the competition qualified for the 1988-89 first round of the UEFA Cup. Vllaznia were the defending champions, having won their fifth Albanian Cup last season. The cup was won by Flamurtari.

The rounds were played in a two-legged format similar to those of European competitions. If the aggregated score was tied after both games, the team with the higher number of away goals advanced. If the number of away goals was equal in both games, the match was decided by extra time and a penalty shootout, if necessary.

== First round ==
Games were played on August & September 1987*

- Results unknown

== Second round ==
All sixteen teams of the 1986–87 Superliga and First Division entered in this round. First and second legs were played in January 1988.

Team 1	Agg.	Team 2	1st leg	2nd leg
Studenti	3–4	Besa	1–1	2–3
Tomori	1–3	Apolonia	1–1	0–2
Skënderbeu	1–7	Flamurtari	0–3	1–4
Besëlidhja	4–3	Lokomotiva Durrës	4–2	0–1
Luftëtari	4–1	Labinoti	4–1	0–0
31 Korriku	2–1	17 Nëntori	2–0	0–1
Dinamo Tirana	2–3	Vllaznia	2–1	0–2
Bistrica	1–5	Partizani	0–1	1–4

== Quarter-finals ==
In this round entered the 8 winners from the previous round.

Team 1	Agg.	Team 2	1st leg	2nd leg
31 Korriku	3–5	Partizani	2–1	1–4
Besëlidhja	3–3 (2–4 p)	Apolonia	2–1	1–2
Besa	1–1	Flamurtari	1–1	0–0
Luftëtari	2–5	Vllaznia	2–1	0–4

== Semi-finals ==
In this round entered the four winners from the previous round.

Team 1	Agg.	Team 2	1st leg	2nd leg
Apolonia	1–3	Partizani	1–1	0–2
Flamurtari	5–3	Vllaznia	0–1	5–2

== Final ==
9 June 1988
17:00

Flamurtari	1–0	Partizani
Bubeqi 53'

Loro Boriçi Stadium, Shkodër
Attendance: 8,000
Referee: Dhori Prifti
