= 1990–91 Albanian National Championship =

Albanian National Championship
- Season: 1990–91
- Champions: Flamurtari; 1st Albanian title
- Relegated: Luftëtari
- European Cup: Flamurtari
- UEFA Cup: Vllaznia
- Cup Winners' Cup: Partizani
- Matches: 273
- Goals: 649 (2.38 per match)
- Top goalscorer: Kliton Bozgo (29 goals)

The 1990–91 Albanian National Championship was the 52nd season of the Albanian National Championship, the top professional league for association football clubs, since its establishment in 1930.

== Teams ==
=== Stadia and last season ===
Locations of the 1990–91 Albanian National Championship teams

Team	Location	Stadium	Capacity	Last season
17 Nëntori	Tirana	Qemal Stafa Stadium (Note: 17 Nëntori, Dinamo Tirana and Partizani all shared the Qemal Stafa Stadium as well as the Selman Stërmasi Stadium.)	19,700	4th
Apolonia	Fier	Loni Papuçiu Stadium	10,000	6th
Besa	Kavajë	Besa Stadium	8,000	8th
Dinamo Tirana	Tirana	Qemal Stafa Stadium	19,700	Champions
Flamurtari	Vlorë	Flamurtari Stadium	15,000	3rd
Kastrioti	Krujë	Kastrioti Stadium	10,000	Kategoria e Dytë
Labinoti	Elbasan	Ruzhdi Bizhuta Stadium	15,000	12th
Lokomotiva	Durrës	Niko Dovana Stadium	12,040	10th
Luftëtari	Gjirokastër	Gjirokastër Stadium	9,000	7th
Partizani	Tirana	Qemal Stafa Stadium	19,700	2nd
Skënderbeu	Korçë	Skënderbeu Stadium	12,000	Kategoria e Dytë
Tomori	Berat	Tomori Stadium	14,750	9th
Traktori	Lushnjë	Abdurrahman Roza Haxhiu Stadium	12,000	Kategoria e Dytë
Vllaznia	Shkodër	Loro Boriçi Stadium	15,000	5th

== League table ==
Pos	Team	Pld	W	D	L	GF	GA	GD	Pts	Qualification or relegation
1	Flamurtari (C)	39	24	6	9	63	32	+31	54	Qualification for the European Cup first round
2	Partizani	39	18	12	9	52	35	+17	48	Qualification for the Cup Winners' Cup first round
3	Vllaznia	39	16	13	10	57	47	+10	45	Qualification for the UEFA Cup first round
4	17 Nëntori	39	16	12	11	52	40	+12	44	
5	Tomori	39	13	14	12	62	47	+15	40	
6	Dinamo Tirana	39	13	14	12	53	44	+9	40	
7	Apolonia	39	13	12	14	49	47	+2	38	
8	Lokomotiva Durrës	39	12	12	15	30	38	−8	36	
9	Labinoti	39	11	14	14	29	37	−8	36	
10	Skënderbeu	39	10	15	14	46	55	−9	35	
11	Besa	39	11	12	16	45	50	−5	34	
12	Kastrioti	39	12	10	17	41	62	−21	34	
13	Traktori	39	10	12	17	39	60	−21	32	
14	Luftëtari (R)	39	12	6	21	31	55	−24	30	Relegation to the 1991–92 Kategoria e Dytë

Source: RSSSF.org
Rules for classification: 1) Points; 2) Head-to-head points; 3) Head-to-head goal difference; 4) Head-to-head goals scored; 5) Goal difference; 6) Goals scored; 7) Draw.
(C) Champions; (R) Relegated

== Results ==
=== First and second round ===
Home \ Away	17N	APO	BES	DIN	FLA	KAS	LAB	LOK	LUF	PAR	SKË	TOM	TRA	VLL
17 Nëntori		1–0	1–0	1–1	1–2	4–1	1–0	2–2	3–1	2–3	1–1	3–1	3–1	1–1
Apolonia	1–0		2–0	1–1	1–2	4–1	0–0	0–0	5–2	2–2	2–0	1–0	1–0	3–3
Besa	0–2	3–2		0–0	0–0	3–1	2–1	3–0	1–1	0–0	2–1	2–3	1–0	1–2
Dinamo	1–1	1–0	2–0		0–1	6–1	1–0	4–0	2–0	2–3	2–2	1–1	2–0	3–0
Flamurtari	1–0	1–0	1–0	3–2		3–0	0–1	4–1	3–0	3–0	2–0	1–0	4–0	2–0
Kastrioti	0–0	0–1	2–1	1–0	1–0		1–0	1–2	1–0	1–0	2–2	2–0	2–2	0–0
Labinoti	1–0	0–3	1–1	1–1	1–3	0–0		2–0	3–0	1–1	1–0	1–0	0–0	3–2
Lokomotiva	0–0	0–0	0–0	2–0	0–1	0–0	0–1		1–0	1–0	3–0	0–1	1–0	0–0
Luftëtari	2–1	2–1	2–1	0–1	0–1	2–1	0–0	2–0		2–1	2–1	1–1	1–0	0–1
Partizani	1–0	1–0	1–1	2–3	0–0	6–2	2–0	1–0	1–0		2–1	3–1	3–0	1–1
Skënderbeu	2–2	2–0	4–0	1–1	2–0	1–0	2–1	2–1	1–0	2–2		1–1	3–0	0–0
Tomori	0–0	1–1	1–1	1–1	1–1	4–0	1–0	1–1	5–1	0–0	3–1		5–0	2–2
Traktori	0–1	2–1	2–1	1–1	0–0	2–2	0–0	2–1	1–0	1–1	2–0	1–1		1–0
Vllaznia	2–0	1–1	3–2	2–1	1–0	2–2	0–0	2–0	1–0	0–0	1–1	5–2	1–0	

Source: CalcioMondialeWeb.it
Legend: Blue = home team win; Yellow = draw; Red = away team win.

=== Third round ===
Home \ Away	17N	APO	BES	DIN	FLA	KAS	LAB	LOK	LUF	PAR	SKË	TOM	TRA	VLL
17 Nëntori		3–1	1–1			2–1	2–1	2–1			0–2	2–1		
Apolonia			1–0			2–1	0–0	0–0			4–1	2–1	1–1	
Besa					3–1				3–0	2–1			4–4	2–1
Dinamo	1–5	1–1	2–0			2–3	2–0				1–1	1–1	1–0	
Flamurtari	3–1	4–1		1–0						1–0	0–0	2–1		5–2
Kastrioti			0–3		4–2			1–0	2–0	0–0			1–1	
Labinoti			2–1		0–0	1–0		1–1	1–1				1–0	
Lokomotiva			0–0	2–1	3–2				1–0	1–0			3–0	1–0
Luftëtari	0–0	2–1		2–0	2–1									1–0
Partizani	1–2	4–1		0–0			2–1		2–0		1–0	2–1		1–0
Skënderbeu			2–0			0–2	0–0	1–1	1–1				2–2	
Tomori			0–0			2–0	3–0	1–0	3–0		5–0		6–5	
Traktori	1–0				3–2				2–1	0–1				2–1
Vllaznia	1–1	3–1		3–1		2–1	4–2				5–3	2–0		

Source: CalcioMondialeWeb.it
Legend: Blue = home team win; Yellow = draw; Red = away team win.

== Season statistics ==
=== Top scorers ===
Rank	Player	Club	Goals
1	(Albania) Kliton Bozgo	Tomori	29
2	(Albania) Altin Rraklli	Besa	27
3	(Albania) Ilir Kepa	Vllaznia	16
4	(Albania) Ermal Tahiri	Dinamo Tirana	14
5	(Albania) Sokol Kushta	Flamurtari	13
5	(Albania) Eduard Kaçaçi	Partizani	13
7	(Albania) Edmond Dosti	Kastrioti	12
7	(Albania) Kujtim Majaci	Apolonia	12
9	(Albania) Edmond Voda	Tomori	11
9	(Albania) Krenar Alimehmeti	17 Nëntori	11
