= Flamurtari FC =

Albanian football club

Flamurtari
- Full name: Flamurtari Football Club
- Nicknames: Kuq e Zinjtë; Flota Kuq e Zi
- Founded: 23 March 1923; 103 years ago as Shoqëria Sportive Vlorë
- Ground: Flamurtari Stadium
- Capacity: 9,500
- Owner(s): Bashkia Vlorë, TRK MW Group,
- President: Sinan Idrizi
- Manager: Oltijon Kërnaja
- League: Kategoria e Parë
- 2025–26: Kategoria Superiore, 10th (relegated)
Home colours	Away colours	Third colours

Flamurtari Football Club is an Albanian professional football club based in Vlorë, Albania. The club plays in the Kategoria e Parë, which is the second tier of football in the country.

Founded in 1923, the club is one of the oldest in Albania, also being one of its most successful clubs, having won one Albanian Superliga title in 1991, four Albanian Cups, and two Albanian Supercups. Flamurtari is also known for their European runs in the 1980s, where they famously reached the last sixteen in the 1987–88 UEFA Cup, where they beat Spanish giants Barcelona in Vlorë but lost on aggregate.

== History ==
=== Early years ===
KS Flamurtari Vlorë were founded on 23 March 1923, as Shoqeria Sportive Vlorë with Milto Korçari as the club's first ever President, while Malo Ismaili held the role of the secretary and Faslli Zoga that of the financier. The club was created to make sports more organised and popular, with a focus on football. Its financial needs were covered by donations from the members or from different activities organised in the city of Vlorë. Shoqeria Sportive played their first football match against Shoqëria Sportive Jeronim de Rada, a local team created from students from Vlorë. The match ended in a 2–2 draw. The goals for Shoqeria Sportive were scored by Adem Gavani and Hazbi Tepelena. During the 1920s the club played several friendlies with other Albanian and foreign teams. Interesting were the matches against Crnogorac Cetinje and the football team of the Livorno Naval Institute which the Red and Black Fleet both won 1–0 and 3–2 respectively. Shoqeria Sportive Vlorë were a founder member of the Albanian Football Association and participated in the first championship. Its first official match was against Skënderbeu Korçë in Vlorë and ended with a 2–0 win. The team's first captain in an official match was Jani Kosta. In the first championship Shoqeria Sportive finished bottom of the table with two wins (vs. Skënderbeu Korçë at home, 2–0, and vs. Urani Elbasan away, 2–1), two draws (vs. Skënderbeu Korçë away, 0–0, and vs. Bashkimi Shkodran at home, 1–1) and six losses.

=== World War II ===
In the 1931 championship Shoqeria Sportive played in Group A against Tirana and Bashkimi Shkodran collecting a win at home against Bashkimi Shkodran and three losses, with a negative goal difference of 4–9. Finishing last of the table meant that the team was relegated to the Kategoria e Dyte. Shoqeria Sportive was drawn to play for the next season in Group C of the Kategoria e Dyte against Leka i Madh Permet, Narta and Shqiponja Gjirokastër. The championship ended with success as the team was crowned champions of Group C and thus qualified for the play-off final against the Group B champion, Sportklub Kavajë. The one-legged tie ended 3–1 in favour of Sportklub Kavajë, which meant that Shoqeria Sportive remained for another year in the Second Division. In the next championship Nimet Abazi Delvinë and Vetëtima Himarë entered the competition, while Sportklub Narta withdrew. The season proved once again the superiority of the Red and Black team against their Second Division opponents, by finishing once again top of the Group C and securing promotion. In the two-legged final against Sportklub Elbasan, which determined the winner of the Second Division, Shoqeria Sportive lost 4–3 on aggregate, thus ending the season as runners-up.

The 1934 started with big problems for the team and ended in the worst ways possible, with the Kuqezinjte drawing one and losing the rest of their matches, closing with a −32 goal difference. A total revolution was needed and it came in 1935, when President of the club was chosen Kristaq Strati. He quickly organised the staff and made affiliations with the local amateur teams in Vlore, thus securing young talented players. The team changed the way of playing focusing more on technique and speed and creating its own style of play thanks to the job done by an early activist of the team, Besim Qorri. To complete the revolution on the team, the Board decided to change the team's name from Shoqëria Sportive Vlorë to Shoqata Sportive Ismail Qemali. The next season proved to be more positive and Sh.S. Ismail Qemali finished seventh out of eight teams, but this time with three wins, three draws and eight losses with e goal difference of −21 (GF 14 – GA 35). Even though the team had some great results during the season, the most memorable being the 0–2 away win against Bashkimi Elbasanas, it still didn't avoid a record 11–0 defeat against rivals Tirana. The 1937 championship was almost the same with the previous season with the team finishing 9th out of ten teams, leaving behind only Tomori Berat thanks to a better goal difference.

On 7 April 1939, Albania was invaded by Italy and became an Italian protectorate. However, the invaders were careful to keep football going and thus the 1939 championship started on 1 July 1939. Eight teams were separated in groups of four and played in a knock-out system with two-legged matches to qualify to the semi-finals. Sh.S. Ismail Qemali was drawn to play against Teuta. The first match was played in Kavajë on July 2 and ended in a 1–1 draw. The second was played in the Shallvare Ground in Tirana on 6 August 1939 and ended 3–2 in favour of Teuta. This match was one of the earliest football matches to be transmitted on Radio Tirana, by Albanian journalist Anton Mazreku. After the end of the game, Sh.S. Ismail Qemali appealed the result, pretending that the last minutes of the game were played on total darkness and the result was affected by the lack of lighting. The Technical Commission decided that the game would be replayed. On 10 September 1939, once again at the Shallvare Ground the two teams tried to eliminate each other but Teuta was superior and won the match by three to one. This meant the knockout of Sh.S. Ismail Qemali from the tournament.

=== 1945–1980 ===
In November 1944, Shoqata Sportive Ismail Qemali was re-opened. The championship began on 16 September 1945 and the club was playing against Vllaznia. SH.S. Ismail Qemali lost 1–0. The 1945 season saw the team end in fourth place in a 6 team league. The next championship would be better for The Fleet. On 22 June 1946, the club renamed itself Klubi Sportiv Flamurtari Vlorë. The 1946 season saw Flamurtari going to the championship final after winning First Division Group B. The final was played in two legs, one in Vlorë and one in Shkodër. Flamurtari lost both matches with an aggregated score of 5–0. In 1948, Flamurtari played once again in the final, still losing to Partizani Tirana, 6–2 in Qemal Stafa. In 1951 the club changed its name to Puna Vlorë, but in 1958 the club used once again the name Flamurtari. In 1954 Flamurtari participated in the Spartak Cup and won the competition after beating Vllaznia 6–0 and KS Teuta and Ylli i Kuq Pogradec 2–0. After reaching twice the championship final, in 1960 made it to the Albanian Cup final. In the first round playing against Ylli i Kuq Pogradec and beating them both at home and away matches. In the second round Flamurtari would play against Besa Kavajë. The teams drew both matches and had to go on extra time. After 90 minutes played in Kavaje and 135 minutes played in Vlorë the two teams were still equal. Flamurtari passed the second round thanks to the corners rule: the team that had more corners would qualify. These were 8 to 5 for Flamurtari. In the third round Flamurtari played against Skënderbeu Korçë. The first match in Vlorë ended in a 3–0 win for the home side. In Korçë, in the 2nd leg match, Skënderbeu Korçë were leading 3–0 in half-time. In the second half Flamurtari made one of the greatest comebacks in the history of Albanian football winning 4–3 in the end of the 90 minutes. In the final the team played against Dinamo Tirana and they lost 1–0 after a hard-fought match. The next years were almost same for the team, placed always in mid-table.

=== Golden generation ===
In the 1980s Flamurtari regained their former status as one of the big names in Albanian football. Flamurtari finished in 8th place in the 1980–81 season, but in the following season rose to second, runners-up to SK Tirana. During the season Flamurtari remained unbeaten in all matches at home in all competitions. In 1981 Flamurtari would participate for the first time in an international cup, the Balkans Cup. They played AEK Athens but they lost 3–2 in the Olympic Stadium of Athens.

They finished second in their group with two wins and two losses, achieving 7–8 goals in the process. In 1983–84 Flamurtari once again reached the Albanian Cup final but lost to Tirana. In the season after, Flamurtari won the Albanian Cup. They defeated KF Partizani and thus claimed their first ever professional trophy.

During the 1985-86 season, Flamurtari finished as runners-up in the Kategoria Superiore, level on points with Dinamo Tirana but placed second due to an inferior goal difference. As a result, Flamurtari qualified for European competition for the first time in their history, earning a place in the UEFA Cup. In the first round of the tournament, they were drawn against FC Barcelona.

In the first leg in Vlorë, Flamurtari took a 1–0 lead in the 26th minute. FC Barcelona equalized in injury time. The second leg at Camp Nou ended 0-0. Despite remaining unbeaten over the two matches, Flamurtari were eliminated on the away goals rule.

Flamurtari finished the domestic league season as runners-up in the Kategoria Superiore and reached the final of the Albanian Cup, where they were defeated 4-3 on aggregate by Vllaznia Shkodër. The following season, Flamurtari qualified for the UEFA Cup for a second consecutive year. In the first round, they defeated FK Partizan 3-2 on aggregate, winning 2-1 defeat in the return leg at stadion JNA, where Sokol Kushta scored the decisive away goal.

In the second round, Flamurtari were drawn against FC Erzgebirge Aue (then competing as Wismut Aue). After losing the first leg 1-0 in Aue, they won the return leg 2-0 in Albania to progress on aggregate, becoming the first Albanian club to reach the third round of a European competition.

In the third round, Flamurtari again faced FC Barcelona. The first leg at Camp Nou on November 25th ended in a 4-1 victory for the spanish side after Flamurtari had led 1-0 at halftime. In the return leg, Flamurtari won 1-0, but were eliminated 4-2 on aggregate.

During the same period, Flamurtari won the Albanian Cup, defeating KF Partizani Tirana 1-0 in the final to secure their second title in the competition. In 1989, they competed in the European Cup Winners' Cup against Lech Poznań and were eliminated 4-2 on aggregate. The team later won their first Kategoria Superiore title, finishing six points ahead of the runners-up after notable results during the season. In the same year, Flamurtari also won the Albanian Supercup.

=== The 1990s ===
After the fall of communism, Flamurtari had difficult moments. Many players left the club and went to play abroad. In the 1991–92 season the club started the championship with −6 points because of financial irregularities. Flamurtari finished the Kategoria e Pare in sixth place. In the next season the club faced a huge crisis finishing the season 13th out of 16 teams. But the team improved a lot and many new players from the Youth Academy were brought in. The 1993–94 season saw Flamurtari finishing 2nd and making Stadiumi Flamurtari a fortress, winning nine and drawing four out of 13 matches played home, but away from home the team had some horrible results culminating with a 5–0 away defeat to KF Laçi. The next two seasons Flamurtari would finish in fourth place. The 1996–97 would be the best season for Flamurtari after the fall of communism. The team had a great start in the season with eight wins in the first nine games. Finishing the 1st phase of the championship in the first place, Flamurtari started the second phase while Albania was suffering the 1997 riots. Flamurtari was leading until the week the championship was suspended and the Albanian Football Association decided to play all games after in Tirana, something Flamurtari could not afford because of the danger. So, after the games were played KF Tirana ended up winning the Championship, while Flamurtari finished in third place. The next seasons would be the worst for the team in the last 30 years with the team having its best placement in the 1998–99 season finishing 11th in a 16 team league.

== Supporters ==
Flamurtari Vlorë fans are considered as the most passionate in Albania. They are, also, the vast majority of all Albania, with at least 20% of all Albanians. This is related with the fact that there has not been other football team in Vlorë. Usually, as mentioned in Petraq Hanxhari's book "Per ty, Flamurtar! (For you, Flamurtar!)" from Monday to Thursday the fans used to talk in every pub about the team's last game and condition of the players. On Thursday, after the team's usual test match with any local side, the fans would talk about the next game. But nowadays, the support for Flamurtari has been going down. Even though the ticket sales and the number of season-ticket holders has increased rapidly since 1999 (the lowest average attendance in the entire Flamurtari's history), there are much fewer in comparison with the Communist era. The two fan clubs supporting Flamurtari are "Dragonjte Kuqezi (Red and Black Dragons)" and "Flota Kuqezi (The Red and Black Fleet)". The latter usually stay in the East Stand, commonly known as "Tribuna C".

== Club rivalries ==
Flamurtari Vlorë's main rival is KF Vllaznia Shkodër. During the 1970s, both clubs used to play the most beautiful football in Albania and the matches between them were the most attended from the supporters. The relations between the two clubs in and out of field were rude and supporters usually have had troubles and violence. Other rivals include the capital teams: Dinamo Tirana, KF Tirana and Partizani Tirana. The rivalry with the capital teams comes from the 1980s famous matches between the clubs. There is a lesser rivalry with Apolonia Fier and Teuta. The matches against Teuta are called the "coastal derbies". At years 2011–13, Flamurtari Vlorë had some troubles against Skënderbeu Korçë because of a clash between the fans of each team but the violence has subsided.

== Stadium ==
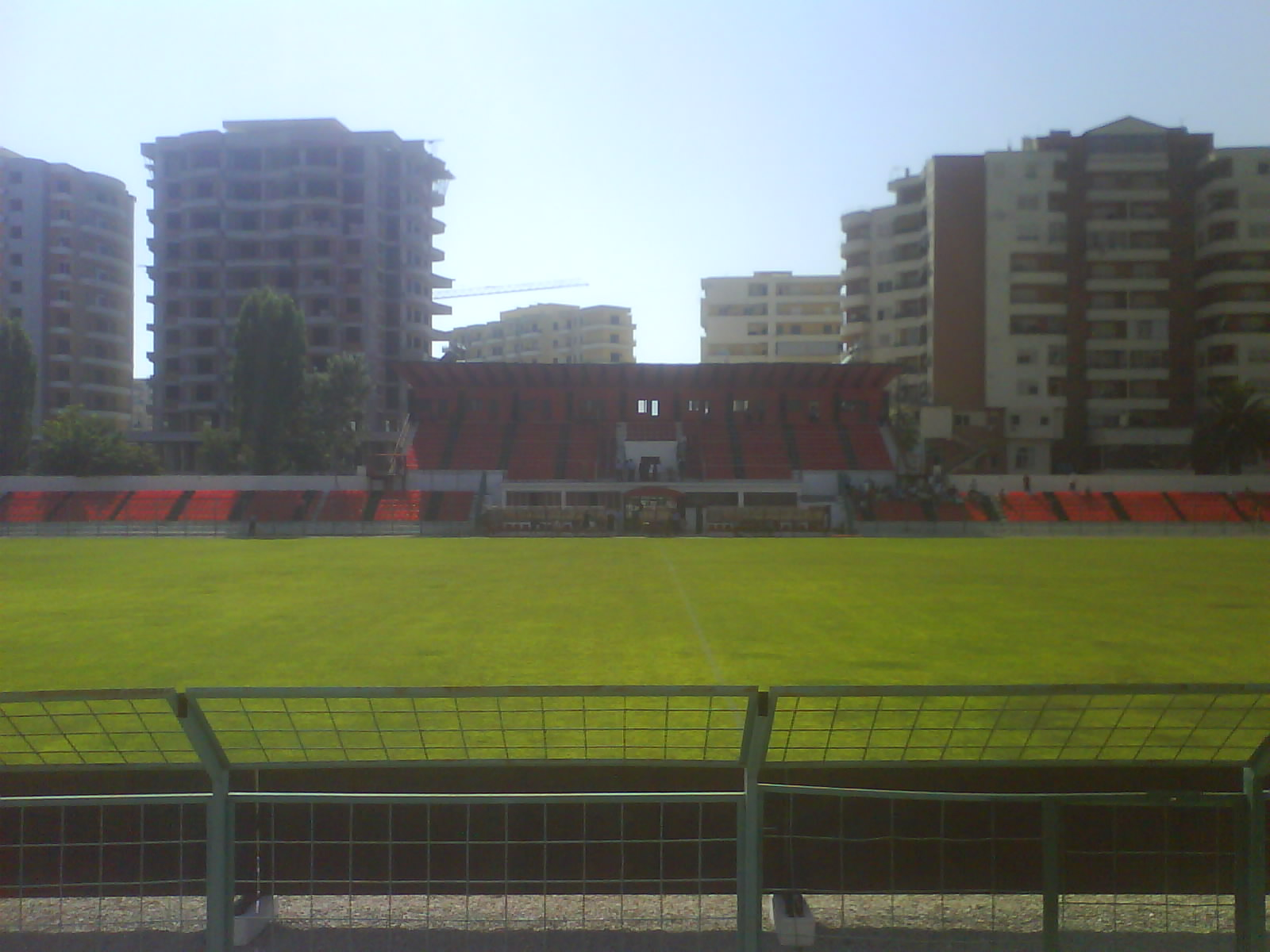
The main stand at the Flamurtari Stadium

Before the construction of the stadium, the club played their home games on a field known as Varri i Halimit, which translates to Halimi's Tomb. The field was located near Uji i Ftohtë, which is where the club's training ground is located. The stadium was built in 1961 with an initial capacity of 6,500, and was expanded to 11,000 in 1975 following reconstruction. During the club's golden era the stadium would attract crowds of up to 15,000 spectators and in 1987 when the club faced Barcelona in the UEFA Cup there was a crowd of 18,500, making it the ground's record attendance. Between 2004 and 2012 the ground was under recurring development with the aid of the Albanian Football Association which saw the ground converted into an all-seater stadium with a capacity of 8,500. In addition to the construction of the stands and the installation of seats, a new parking lot was built and floodlights were installed for the first time.

== Crest and colours ==
=== Badges ===
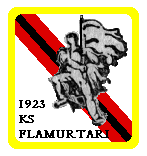
Flamurtari's first crest.

The club's traditional colours are red and black, after the Albanian flag which was used by Ismail Qemali to declare Albania's independence in Vlorë on 28 November 1912. When the club was founded, it was agreed that the colours of the club would match those of the flag, as it had a played a significant role in the city's history. Flamurtari's first crest was designed in 1930 ahead of the club's first competitive match in the inaugural Albanian Football Championship, and it was designed to resemble the Vlorë Municipality coat of arms. Following the Second World War the club changed its crest to the shape of a shield, with the initial F in black in the middle of the shield on a red background. In the 1980s the club's crest changed once again but the shape and style still remained, but the club still placed the initial F on the football kits rather than the full crest until 2000. On 3 August 2015 the club announced that the crest would be changed ahead of the 2015–16 campaign as part of rebranding strategy, but they faced immediate pressure from fans as well as the local municipality who were unhappy at both the decision to change the crest and the new design. The shield shape was replaced by a circle with an F and half of a double headed eagle, as found on the Albanian flag.

=== Kits ===
Flamurtari kits during 1987–88 season.

A photograph of the first ever official championship game, taken on 6 April 1930, shows the players wearing a white jersey with a thick black horizontal stripe at the chest, black shorts and black socks. This design was common in England where post office worker and Flamurtari's president, Milto Korcari, ordered them from. Later, in 1937, the team adopted the vertical stripes and started playing in a red jersey with thin vertical black stripes, black shorts and black socks. In the first years of the team's history the kits featured even the team's emblem while later this was replaced with a golden "F" sewn in the middle of the chest.

After World War II, the team started using red kits, white shorts and red socks. In different championships the team used black shorts instead of white, similar to the design of the Albania national football team. The away kit was all white. This proved to be a popular design with the fans because it reminded them of the national team. In the 1960s however the primary kit was changed again and a new one was introduced. The new kit was white with three vertical stripes in the center (Red – Black – Red), black shorts and black socks. The red kit which earlier had been used as a home kit was now used as an away kit for the first team but it remained as a home kit for the youth team. In 1975 the club decided to reverse once again the kits and the red kit with white shorts and red socks became again the home kit. Away the team used its traditional white kit with the three central vertical stripes.

1981 marked the start of a new era at the club. Apart from a new promising generation of footballers blooming from the youth setup and great results on the pitch, a new kit was introduced which remains until today, with minor changes, the club's home kit. The kit was similar to the one used in the late 1930s, red with thin vertical black stripes, red shorts and red socks while the away kit was still the same. The kit proved to be popular with the fans, primarily because of the colours, which are the Albanian national colours, but also with the great achievements the team reached in this period.

Over the years the home kit has not had major changes and the design has remained almost the same, with the change being in the primary colour of the team, sometimes red and sometimes black, and in the colour of the shorts and socks which have changed from red to black. The away kit has been for many years the same with the club using an all-white in only five seasons since 1981.

A new third kit was introduced for the first time in 2005 to celebrate the team winning the Albanian First Division title. It was all red with red shirts, red shorts and red socks. The kit was used rarely and was dropped for the next season. In 2007 the numbers on the back were of golden colour for the first time in the club's history as the colour mainly used has been white. For the 2011–12 Albanian Superliga the team used an outfit based mostly on black. The kit featured a black chevron and red and black stripes below it, black shorts and black socks. The away kit remained the traditional away kit.

For the 2012–13 Albanian Superliga, Flamurtari used a Legea design based primarily on red with black thick stripes, black shorts and black socks, while the club decided to drop the traditional away kit in favour of an all-white one.

=== Kit evolution ===
1937–45	1946–61, 1975–81	1961–75	1975–90	Late 90s–present

=== Shirt sponsors ===
Sponsor Type	Name
Main sponsor	(Albania) Municipality of Vlorë
Secondary sponsors	Air Albania
Secondary sponsors	(Turkey) TRK
Official clothing provider	(Italy) Macron

== Honours ==
Flamurtari Vlorë honours
Type	Competition	Titles	Seasons/Years
Domestic	Kategoria Superiore	1	1990–91
Domestic	Kategoria e Parë	1	2005–06
Domestic	Kategoria e Dytë	1	2021–22
Domestic	Albanian Cup	4	1984–85, 1987–88, 2008–09, 2013–14
Domestic	Albanian Supercup	2	1990, 1991
Minor	Bashkimi Cup of Journal	3	1962, 1963, 1987
Minor	Trade Unions of Albania Cup	1	1948
Minor	Party of Labour of Albania Cup	1	1976
Minor	Birra Norga Trophy	1	2007

== Players ==
=== Current squad ===
As of 1 January 2026

Note: Flags indicate national team as defined under FIFA eligibility rules; some limited exceptions apply. Players may hold more than one non-FIFA nationality.

No.	Pos.	Nation	Player
1	GK	ALB	Sinan Dani
2	DF	MKD	Todor Todoroski
3	DF	ALB	Hizdion Sulejmani
4	DF	MNE	Momčilo Rašo
5	DF	ALB	Denis Pjeshka (captain)
6	DF	ALB	Marjus Korreshi
7	FW	MKD	Jakup Berisha
8	MF	ALB	Eslit Sala
9	FW	ALB	Mario Gjata
10	FW	GUI	Thierno Barry
11	FW	ALB	Mehdi Coba
15	DF	ALB	Blerim Kotobelli
16	MF	MKD	Hamza Rahmani
17	FW	ALB	Hetem Lushaj

No.	Pos.	Nation	Player
19	DF	ALB	Joni Nurja
20	MF	POR	Paulo Estrela
24	MF	ALB	Antonio Aliaj
22	DF	MKD	Filip Boshkovski
27	FW	SEN	Cheick Mariam Diane
28	DF	ALB	Bjori Doku
29	FW	ALB	Hetem Lushaj
32	MF	ARG	Rodrigo Migone
44	FW	ALB	Elvi Kamaberi
60	GK	ALB	Fjoraldo Bejdollari
66	MF	ALB	Luciano Myrto
70	FW	GAM	Sarjo Abdou
71	GK	ALB	Ariol Kaloshi
99	FW	NGA	Chigozie Kenneth Ani

== Personnel ==
Current technical staff
Position	Name
Head Coach	(Albania) Oltijon Kernaja
Assistant Coach	(Albania) Lejdi Liçaj
Goalkeeping coach	(Albania) Josel Shtrepi
Fitness Coach	(Albania) Mishel Kita
U19 coach	(Albania) Gentjan Ballaj
U17 coach	(Albania) Aldo Guna
Physiotherapist	(Albania) Enis Malaj
Doctor	(Albania) Amarildo Prifti
Board members
Office	Name
President	(Albania) Sinan Idrizi
Vice-president	(Albania) Kreshnik Çipi
Sport director	(Albania) Fabian Beqja
Technical director	(Albania) Eqerem Memushi
Academi director	(Albania) Dritan Resuli
Club Secretary	(Albania) Alfred Ferko

== List of managers ==
1. (Albania) Stavri Lubonja (–1968)
2. (Albania) Hasan Luçi (1968–)
3. (Albania) Bejkush Birçe (1975–1978)
4. (Albania) Agron Sulaj (1979–1983)
5. (Albania) Leonidha Çuri (1983–1988)
6. (Albania) Edmond Liçaj (1990–1994)
7. (Albania) Bejkush Birçe (1994–1996)
8. (Albania) Leonidha Çuri (1996–1997)
9. (Albania) Latif Gjondeda (1997)
10. (Albania) Uran Xhafa (1998)
11. (Albania) Vasil Ruci (1998–1999)
12. (Albania) Edmond Liçaj (1999–2000)
13. (Albania) Sokol Kushta (2000–2001)
14. (Albania) Gjergji Leka (2001)
15. (Albania) Mexhid Haxhiu (2001)
16. (Bulgaria) Nikolay Arabov (2002)
17. (Albania) Petraq Bifsha (2002)
18. (Albania) Leonidha Çuri (2003)
19. (Albania) Petraq Bifsha (2003)
20. (Albania) Alfred Ferko (2003–2004)
21. (Albania) Agim Canaj (2006)
22. (Albania) Eqerem Memushi (2006)
23. (Albania) Vasil Ruci (2006–2007)
24. (Albania) Gerd Haxhiu (2007)
25. (Albania) Eqerem Memushi (2007–2008)
26. (Croatia) Slavko Kovačić (2008)
27. (Albania) Edmond Liçaj (2008–2009)
28. (Albania) Eqerem Memushi (2009)
29. (Albania) Gugash Magani (2009–2011)
30. (Albania) Edmond Lutaj (2011)
31. (Albania) Shkëlqim Muça (2011–2012)
32. (Spain) Julián Rubio (2012)
33. (Albania) Ernest Gjoka (2012–2014)
34. (Italy) Ernestino Ramella (2014–2015)
35. (Czech Republic) Stanislav Levý (2015)
36. (Albania) Gentian Mezani (2015–2016)
37. (North Macedonia) Zekirija Ramadani (2016)
38. (Albania) Gugash Magani (2016)
39. (Albania) Gentian Mezani (2016–2017)
40. (Albania) Shpëtim Duro (2017–2018)
41. (Albania) Ardian Behari (2018)
42. (Albania) Ilir Daja (2018–2019)
43. (Brazil) Marcello Troisi (2019)
44. (Albania) Gerd Haxhiu (2019)
45. (Albania) Dritan Sadedini (2019)
46. (Albania) Luan Birce (2019)
47. (Albania) Dritan Resuli (2020)
48. (Brazil) Marcello Troisi (2020)
49. (Albania) Dritan Resuli (2020 − Mar 2021)
50. (Portugal) Rui Sampaio (2021)
51. (Albania) Fjodor Xhafa (2021)
52. (Albania) Dritan Resuli (Sep 2021 − Sep 2022)
53. (Brazil) Marcello Troisi (Sep 2022 – Mar 2023)
54. (Italy) Diego Longo (Mar 2023 – Jun 2023)
55. (Albania) Emiliano Çela (Jun 2023 − 27 Nov 2023)
56. (Albania) Dritan Resuli (28 Nov 2023 − 30 Jan 2024)
57. (Albania) Alfred Ferko (30 Jan 2024 − 2 Feb 2024)
58. (Albania) Eqerem Memushi (3 Feb 2024– 1 Jun 2024)
59. (Italy) Andrea Agostinelli (13 Jul 2024– 26 Mar 2025)
60. (North Macedonia) Artim Položani (27 Mar 2025– 25 May 2025)
61. (Spain) Carlos García Badías (28 Jun 2025– 6 Oct 2025)
62. (Italy) Francesco Moriero (8 Oct 2025– 8 Mar 2026)
63. (Albania) Andi Ribaj (9 Mar 2026– 1 Jun 2026)
64. (Albania) Oltijon Kernaja (18 Jun 2026– )

== Recent seasons ==
As of 23 May 2018

Season	League	Pos	Pld	W	D	L	GF	GA	Pts	Cup
2006–07	Kategoria Superiore	9th	33	9	7	17	35	41	34	R16
2007–08	Kategoria Superiore	8th	33	10	14	9	35	37	44	R16
2008–09	Kategoria Superiore	6th	33	10	12	11	33	33	42	W
2009–10	Kategoria Superiore	5th	33	13	8	2	42	39	47	R16
2010–11	Kategoria Superiore	2nd	33	22	3	8	62	27	66^{−3}	R16
2011–12	Kategoria Superiore	4th	26	13	7	6	42	20	46	SF
2012–13	Kategoria Superiore	4th	26	13	7	6	49	33	46	QF
2013–14	Kategoria Superiore	7th	33	14	9	10	45	40	48^{−3}	W
2014–15	Kategoria Superiore	6th	36	10	8	18	29	37	38	QF
2015–16	Kategoria Superiore	8th	36	9	11	16	34	44	35^{−3}	SF
2016–17	Kategoria Superiore	8th	36	12	10	14	42	34	40^{−6}	QF
2017–18	Kategoria Superiore	6th	36	11	13	12	37	37	46	SF
2018–19	Kategoria Superiore	5th	36	15	9	12	35	32	54	SR
2019–20	Kategoria Superiore	9th	36	2	9	25	32	72	15	SR
2020–21	Kategoria e Parë	7th	20	5	2	13	14	30	14	SR
2021–22	Kategoria e Dytë	1st	22	18	4	0	57	7	58	QF
2022–23	Kategoria e Parë	3rd	26	13	7	6	48	23	46	R16
2023–24	Kategoria e Parë	3rd	33	16	10	7	46	29	58	R16
2024–25	Kategoria e Parë	2nd	33	23	6	4	62	21	75	R32
2025–26	Kategoria Superiore	10th	36	8	12	16	39	45	36	R16
2026–27	Kategoria e Parë									

== European record ==
At an international level, Flamurtari are best known for a series of good results obtained in the late 1980s, being one of the most successful Albanian teams in the history of European Competitions. In the 1986–87 UEFA Cup season, they played against Barcelona, who eliminated them with a 1–1 scoreline in Vlorë and a 0–0 draw in Barcelona. In the next season, Flamurtari managed to knock out Partizan as 2–0 in Vlorë and 1–2 in Belgrade and Wismut Aue as 0–1 in Aue and 2–0 in Vlorë before losing again to Barcelona as 1–4 in Barcelona and 1–0 in Vlorë. In the 2009–10 UEFA Europa League campaign, they faced Motherwell from the Scottish Premier League. The team put in a strong performance despite playing against technically gifted opponents to record a 1–0 home victory. However, despite going to Scotland with confidence boosted, they were beaten 8–1.

Season	Competition	Round	Opponent	Home	Away
1980–81	Balkans Cup	Group A	(Greece) AEK Athens	2–1	2–3
1980–81	Balkans Cup	Group A	(Socialist Federal Republic of Yugoslavia) Velež Mostar	2–1	1–4
1985–86	UEFA Cup Winners' Cup	1R	(Finland) HJK Helsinki	1–2	2–3
1986–87	UEFA Cup	1R	(Spain) Barcelona	1–1	0–0
1987–88	UEFA Cup	1R	(Socialist Federal Republic of Yugoslavia) Partizan	2–0	1–2
1987–88	UEFA Cup	2R	(East Germany) Wismut Aue	2–0	0–1
1987–88	UEFA Cup	1/16	(Spain) Barcelona	1–0	1–4
1988–89	UEFA Cup Winners' Cup	1R	(Poland) Lech Poznan	2–3	0–1
1990–91	UEFA Cup Winners' Cup	1R	(Greece) Olympiacos	0–2	1–3
1991–92	UEFA European Cup	1R	(Sweden) IFK Göteborg	1–1	0–0
1996–97	UEFA Cup Winners' Cup	QR	(Slovakia) Humenné	0–2	0–1
2009–10	UEFA Europa League	2QR	(Scotland) Motherwell	1–0	1–8
2011–12	UEFA Europa League	1QR	(Montenegro) Buducnost Podgorica	1–2	3–1
2011–12	UEFA Europa League	2QR	(Czech Republic) Baumit Jablonec	0–2	1–5
2012–13	UEFA Europa League	1QR	(Hungary) Budapest Honvéd	0–1	0–2
2014–15	UEFA Europa League	1QR	(Georgia (country)) Sioni Bolnisi	1–2	3–2
2014–15	UEFA Europa League	2QR	(Romania) Petrolul Ploiești	1–3	0–2

== Notable European campaigns ==
Season	Achievement	Notes
UEFA Europa League
1986–87	First Round	eliminated by (Spain) FC Barcelona 1–1 on aggregate*
1987–88	Round of 16	eliminated by (Spain) FC Barcelona 4–2 on aggregate

Season	Achievement	Notes
UEFA Champions League
1991–92	First Round	eliminated by (Sweden) IFK Göteborg 1–1 on aggregate*

*Using away goals rule
