= 2022–23 KF Tirana season =

Tirana
2022–23 season
- President: Refik Halili
- Head Coach: Orges Shehi
- Stadium: Selman Stërmasi Stadium
- Albanian Superliga: 2nd
- Albanian Cup: Runner-ups
- Albanian Supercup: Winners
- Champions League: First qualifying round
- Conference League: Second qualifying round
Home colours	Away colours

The 2022–23 season was Tirana's 93rd season in their history of the Albanian Superliga and came in as the defending champions. Along with the Superliga, the club was also participated in the Albanian Supercup, Albanian Cup, and the Champions League qualifying stage. The season began in August 2022 and ended in May 2023.

== First team squad ==
Goals & Appearances as of 31 May 2023

No.	Player	Nat.	Position(s)	Date of birth (age)	Signed in	Contract ends	Signed from	Transfer fee	Notes	Apps	Goals
Goalkeepers
1	Ilion Lika	(Albania)	GK	17 May 1980 (age 46)	2016	2023	(Albania) Flamurtari Vlorë	Free		105	0
31	Tomas Kiri	(Albania)	GK	2 January 2005 (age 21)	2022	2025	(Albania) Tirana U-21	Free	From Youth system	0	0
97	Visar Bekaj	(Kosovo)	GK	24 May 1997 (age 29)	2020	2023	(Kosovo) Prishtina	€55k		103	0
Defenders
2	Kristijan Toshevski	(North Macedonia)	RB	6 May 1994 (age 32)	2020	2023	(North Macedonia) Vardar Skopje	Free		84	0
4	Besir Iseni	(North Macedonia)	CB	2 May 2000 (age 26)	2022	2025	(North Macedonia) Struga Trim-Lum	Free		7	0
5	Filip Najdovski (C.)	(North Macedonia)	CB	6 October 1997 (age 29)	2020	2024	(North Macedonia) Vardar Skopje	Free		89	4
18	Florjan Përgjoni	(Albania)	LB	22 June 1997 (age 29)	2021	2024	(Albania) Besëlidhja Lezhë	Free		54	2
20	Jocelin Behiratche	(Ivory Coast)	CB	8 May 2000 (age 26)	2021	2023	(Italy) Giorgione Castelfranco Veneto	Free		73	3
33	Ermal Meta	(Albania)	CB	20 June 2005 (age 21)	2023	2025	(Albania) Tirana U-21	Free	From Youth system	0	0
44	Bruno Lulaj	(Albania)	CB	2 April 1995 (age 31)	2022	2023	(Albania) Kukësi	Free		24	2
Midfielders
6	Albano Aleksi	(Albania)	DM	10 October 1992 (age 34)	2022	2023	(Albania) Teuta Durrës	Free		32	0
10	Regi Lushkja	(Albania)	CM	17 May 1996 (age 30)	2023	2023	(Moldova) Sheriff Tiraspol	Free		16	0
15	Jurgen Sina	(Albania)	CM	12 November 2004 (age 21)	2022	2025	(Albania) Tirana U-21	Free	From Youth system	0	0
21	Klevi Qefalija	(Albania)	CM	12 December 2003 (age 22)	2021	2025	(Albania) Tirana U-21	Free	From Youth system	19	0
22	Ardit Deliu	(Albania)	CM	26 October 1997 (age 29)	2022	2023	(Latvia) Liepāja	Free		30	1
27	Ardit Hila	(Albania)	CM	6 January 1993 (age 33)	2022	2023	(Albania) Kukësi	Free		29	6
29	Nicollas Gustavo	(Brazil)	CM	27 April 2004 (age 22)	2022	2025	(Albania) Tirana U-21	Free	From Youth system	0	0
45	Alen Lutaj	(Albania)	CM	19 November 2004 (age 21)	2022	2025	(Albania) Tirana U-21	Free	From Youth system	0	0
55	Hajrulla Tola	(Albania)	CM	1 July 2004 (age 22)	2022	2025	(Albania) Tirana U-21	Free	From Youth system	1	0
66	Danilo Bajraktari	(Albania)	CM	8 July 2004 (age 22)	2022	2025	(Albania) Tirana U-21	Free	From Youth system	1	0
88	Alkejd Ajazi	(Albania)	CM	16 January 2004 (age 22)	2023	2025	(Albania) Tirana U-21	Free	From Youth system	0	0
99	Erlind Qehaja	(Albania)	CM	16 June 2004 (age 22)	2023	2025	(Albania) Tirana U-21	Free	From Youth system	0	0
Forwards
7	Elvi Berisha	(Albania)	LW	2 March 1999 (age 27)	2022	2025	(Albania) Skënderbeu Korçë	€66k		16	0
9	Florent Hasani	(Kosovo)	RW	25 March 1997 (age 29)	2022	2024	(Hungary) Gyirmót Győr	Free		34	16
14	Rimal Haxhiu	(Albania)	RW	4 March 1999 (age 27)	2023	2024	(Albania) Apolonia Fier	Free		17	2
17	Aldi Gjumsi	(Albania)	RW/LW	15 March 2002 (age 24)	2020	2025	(Albania) Tirana U-21	Free	From Youth system	47	1
24	Serxhio Tafa	(Albania)	ST	31 March 2003 (age 23)	2022	2025	(Albania) Tirana U-21	Free	From Youth system	0	0
30	Dijar Nikqi	(Albania)	ST	20 October 2004 (age 22)	2021	2025	(Albania) Tirana U-21	Free	From Youth system	38	4
77	Kristal Abazaj	(Albania)	LW	6 July 1996 (age 30)	2023	2024	(Turkey) İstanbulspor	Free		14	5
98	Patrick	(Brazil)	ST	11 May 1998 (age 28)	2022	2023	(Austria) Admira Wacker Mödling	Free		22	6

== Transfers ==
=== Transfers in ===
Date	Pos.	Nat.	Name	From	Fee	Ref.
2 June 2022	MF	(Albania)	Albano Aleksi	Teuta Durrës	Free Transfer	
8 June 2022	FW	(Kosovo)	Florent Hasani	(Hungary) Gyirmót Győr	Free Transfer	
12 June 2022	MF	(Albania)	Ardit Hila	Kukësi	Free Transfer	
30 June 2022	DF	(North Macedonia)	Besir Iseni	(North Macedonia) Struga Trim-Lum	Free Transfer	
15 July 2022	MF	(Nigeria)	Lukman Hussein	Kastrioti Krujë	Free Transfer	
9 August 2022	MF	(Albania)	Sherif Kallaku	(Croatia) Lokomotiva Zagreb	Free Transfer	
18 August 2022	FW	(Brazil)	Patrick	(Austria) Admira Wacker Mödling	Free Transfer	
25 August 2022	MF	(Albania)	Elvi Berisha	Skënderbeu Korçë	€66k	
27 August 2022	MF	(Albania)	Ardit Deliu	(Latvia) Liepāja	Free Transfer	
1 September 2022	DF	(Albania)	Bruno Lulaj	Kukësi	Free Transfer	
10 January 2023	MF	(Albania)	Regi Lushkja	(Moldova) Sheriff Tiraspol	Free Transfer	
22 January 2023	FW	(Albania)	Kristal Abazaj	(Turkey) İstanbulspor	Free Transfer	
31 January 2023	FW	(Albania)	Rimal Haxhiu	Apolonia Fier	Free Transfer	

=== Transfers out ===
Date	Pos.	Nat.	Name	To	Fee	Ref.
2 June 2022	DF	(Albania)	Erion Hoxhallari	(Romania) UTA Arad	Released	
10 June 2022	MF	(Albania)	Andri Stafa	(Kosovo) Llapi Podujevë	Released	
12 June 2022	MF	(Kosovo)	Engjëll Hoti	Partizani Tirana	Released	
14 June 2022	FW	(Albania)	Mario Beshiraj	Erzeni Shijak	Released	
1 July 2022	DF	(Albania)	Gentian Muça	Retired	Released	
1 July 2022	DF	(Albania)	Ardit Toli	(Ukraine) Vorskla Poltava	€120k	
1 July 2022	FW	(England)	Michael Ngoo	Unattached	Released	
2 August 2022	MF	(North Macedonia)	Ennur Totre	(Ukraine) Vorskla Poltava	€250k	
16 August 2022	FW	(Brazil)	Devid	(Malaysia) Kelantan United	Released	
22 August 2022	FW	(Albania)	Taulant Seferi	(Ukraine) Vorskla Poltava	€500k	
30 August 2022	DF	(Albania)	Marlind Nuriu	Unattached	Released	
4 January 2023	DF	(Albania)	Realf Zhivanaj	Dinamo Tirana	Released	
11 January 2023	DF	(Nigeria)	Lukman Hussein	(Kosovo) Drenica Skënderaj	Released	
12 January 2023	DF	(Albania)	Arbër Bytyqi	(Kosovo) Llapi Podujevë	Released	
13 January 2023	MF	(Albania)	Sherif Kallaku	Teuta Durrës	Released	
23 January 2023	MF	(Germany)	Vesel Limaj	(Romania) Hermannstadt	Released	
24 January 2023	FW	(Albania)	Redon Xhixha	(Azerbaijan) Qarabağ Bakı	€550k	
31 January 2023	DF	(Albania)	Marsel Ismajlgeci	(Bosnia and Herzegovina) Zrinjski Mostar	€150k	

=== Loans out ===
Date	Pos.	Nat.	Name	To	Date until	Ref.
14 July 2022	MF	(Albania)	Enes Kuka	Besa Kavajë	30 June 2023	
11 August 2022	DF	(Albania)	Omar Musaj	Turbina Cërrik	30 June 2023	
31 January 2023	GK	(Albania)	Leon Kozi	(Kosovo) Drenica Skënderaj	30 June 2023	

== Friendlies ==
Win Draw Loss

16 June 2022 Friendly	Tirana (Albania)	1–2	(Moldova) Dinamo-Auto Tiraspol	Boluspor Training Field, Bolu (Turkey)
11:00 CEST	Xhixha 48'	Report	71'; 75'

19 June 2022 Friendly	Shkupi (North Macedonia)	0–2	(Albania) Tirana	Boluspor Training Field, Bolu (Turkey)
15:00 CEST		Report	Limaj; Seferi

22 June 2022 Friendly	Tirana (Albania)	0–0	(Romania) Hermannstadt	Boluspor Training Field, Bolu (Turkey)
16:00 CEST		Report

25 June 2022 Friendly	Fenerbahçe (Turkey)	4–0	(Albania) Tirana	Şükrü Saracoğlu Stadium, Istanbul (Turkey)
17:00 CEST	Berisha 9'; Novák 53'; Pelkas 84'; Samatta 88'	Report

6 August 2022 Friendly	Erzeni Shijak	0–2	Tirana	Tofik Jashari Stadium, Shijak
18:00 CEST		Report	Xhixha 65' (pen.); Hasani 85'

13 August 2022 Friendly	Bylis Ballsh	1–3	Tirana	Adush Muça Stadium, Ballsh
17:00 CEST	Ruçi 39'	Report	Xhixha 42' (pen.); Ismailgeci 45+1'; Hila 76'

26 November 2022 Friendly	Tirana	3–1	Besa Kavajë	Selman Stërmasi Stadium, Tirana
12:00 CET	Xhixha; Patrick; Nikqi	Report

7 January 2023 Friendly	Tirana	2–0	Tërbuni Pukë	Selman Stërmasi Stadium, Tirana
11:30 CET	Xhixha; Nikqi	Report

25 March 2023 Friendly	Vora	2–0	Tirana	Stadiumi Vora, Vorë
15:30 CET	Prengaj 47' 82'	Report

== Competitions ==
=== Overview ===
Competition	First match	Last match	Starting round	Final position	Record							
Competition	First match	Last match	Starting round	Final position	Pld	W	D	L	GF	GA	GD	Win %
Kategoria Superiore	19 August 2022	29 July 2023	Matchday 1	2nd	36	20	7	9	56	33	+23	55.56
Albanian Cup	28 September 2022	1 June 2023	First round	Runners-up	9	6	2	1	18	6	+12	66.67
Albanian Supercup	7 December 2022		Final	Winners	1	1	0	0	4	2	+2	100.00
Champions League	6 July 2022	12 July 2022	First qualifying round	First qualifying round	2	0	0	2	1	3	−2	0.00
Conference League	19 July 2022	28 July 2022	Second qualifying round	Second qualifying round	2	0	0	2	2	4	−2	0.00
Total					50	27	9	14	81	48	+33	54.00

Last updated: 29 May 2023
Source: Soccerway

=== Albanian Supercup ===
7 December 2022 Final	Tirana	3–2	Vllaznia Shkodër	Air Albania Stadium, Tirana
19:00 CET	Najdovski (yellow card) 35'; Patrick 39'; Deliu (yellow card) 49'; Hasani 53'; Hila (yellow card) 85'; Përgjoni (yellow card) 85'; Xhixha 90+2' (yellow card) 90+3'; Bekaj (yellow card) 90+5'	Report	Mala 8'; Shehi (yellow card) 81'; Latifi 86' (pen.)	Referee: Eldorjan Hamiti (Lezhë)

=== Albanian Superliga ===
==== League table ====
Pos	Team	Pld	W	D	L	GF	GA	GD	Pts	Qualification or relegation
1	Partizani (C)	36	20	7	9	56	37	+19	67 (Note: Head to head points: Partizani 7, Tirana 4)	Qualification for the Champions League first qualifying round
2	Tirana	36	20	7	9	56	33	+23	67	Qualification for the Europa Conference League first qualifying round (Note: Egnatia, the winners of the 2022–23 Albanian Cup, qualified for European competitions based on league position. Therefore, the Europa Conference League berth awarded to the Albanian Cup winners was transferred to the fourth-placed team.)
3	Egnatia	36	14	10	12	46	32	+14	52	Qualification for the Europa Conference League first qualifying round
4	Vllaznia	36	13	11	12	39	37	+2	50	Qualification for the Europa Conference League first qualifying round
5	Laçi	36	14	6	16	45	46	−1	48 (Note: Head to head points: Laçi 12, Teuta 0)	

Source: Albanian Football Association
Rules for classification: 1) Points; 2) Head-to-head points; 3) Head-to-head goal difference; 4) Head-to-head goals scored; 5) Goal difference; 6) Goals scored; 7) Draw.
(C) Champions

==== Results summary ====
Overall								Home						Away					
Pld	W	D	L	GF	GA	GD	Pts	W	D	L	GF	GA	GD	W	D	L	GF	GA	GD
36	20	7	9	56	33	+23	67	10	3	5	35	20	+15	10	4	4	21	13	+8

Last updated: 29 May 2023.
Source: Competitive matches

==== Results by round ====
Round	1	2	3	4	5	6	7	8	9	10	11	12	13	14	15	16	17	18	19	20	21	22	23	24	25	26	27	28	29	30	31	32	33	34	35	36
Ground	A	A	H	A	H	A	H	A	H	H	H	A	H	A	H	A	H	A	A	A	H	A	H	A	H	A	H	H	H	A	H	A	H	A	H	A
Result	D	W	L	D	W	W	D	W	L	W	W	D	W	L	L	W	W	W	L	W	L	W	L	L	W	D	W	W	W	W	W	L	D	W	D	W
Position	5	3	4	6	4	2	2	2	3	2	1	1	1	2	2	2	1	1	1	1	1	1	1	2	1	2	2	1	1	1	1	1	1	1	2	2

Updated to match(es) played on 29 May 2023. Source: Competitive matches
A = Away; H = Home; W = Win; D = Draw; L = Loss

==== Matches ====
19 August 2022 1	Kukësi	1–1	Tirana	Kukës Arena, Kukës
17:00 CEST	Daci 3' (red card) 71'; Ndreca (yellow card) 41'; Hasaj (yellow card) 55'; Haxhiu (yellow card) 78'	Report	Xhixha 56'; Iseni (yellow card) 72'; Qefalija (yellow card) 86'	Referee: Enea Jorgji (Elbasan)

28 August 2022 2	Egnatia	0–2	Tirana	Rrogozhinë Stadium, Rrogozhinë
17:00 CEST	Ojediran (yellow card) 42'; Jackson (yellow card) 52'	Report	Kallaku 14'; Hasani 54'; Hila (yellow card) 90'	Referee: Laver Alla (Lushnjë)

2 September 2022 3	Tirana	1–2	Vllaznia Shkodër	Selman Stërmasi Stadium, Tirana
16:00 CEST	Përgjoni (yellow card) 11'; Zhivanaj (red card) 21'; Xhixha 47' (yellow card) 52'; Gjumsi (yellow card) 87'	Report	Marku 22' (pen.) (yellow card) 30' (yellow-red card) 50'; Bulatović (yellow card) 27'; Kainã 29'; Gurishta (yellow card) 83'; Çoba (yellow card) 90+4'	Referee: Enea Jorgji (Elbasan)

10 September 2022 4	Kastrioti Krujë	0–0	Tirana	Kamëz Stadium, Kamëz
15:00 CEST	Stojanović (yellow card) 5'; Selmani (yellow card) 47'	Report	Xhixha (yellow card) 38'; Patrick (yellow card) 68'	Referee: Andi Koçi (Durrës)

16 September 2022 5	Tirana	4–0	Teuta Durrës	Selman Stërmasi Stadium, Tirana
16:00 CEST	Xhixha 43' 59' 90+2' (pen.); Hasani 49'	Report	L. Vila (yellow card) 41'; Kotobelli (yellow card) 90+1'; Çyrbja (yellow card) 90+1'	Referee: Klodjan Prenga (Laç)

2 October 2022 6	Partizani Tirana	0–2	Tirana	Air Albania Stadium, Tirana
19:00 CEST	Sota (yellow card) 47'; Massanga (red card) 90+5'	Report	Lulaj (red card) 38'; Xhixha 45+1' 69'; Bekaj (yellow card) 79'	Referee: Juxhin Xhaja (Tirana)

7 October 2022 7	Tirana	3–3	Laçi	Selman Stërmasi Stadium, Tirana
15:00 CEST	Xhixha 23' 36' 73'; Behiratche (yellow card) 61'; Hussein (yellow card) 66'	Report	Ujka (yellow card) 19'; Mazrekaj 21' 89'; Cucin (yellow card) 41'; Roganović (yellow card) 54'; Borysiuk 63' (pen.)	Referee: Silvio Dyrmishi (Elbasan)

16 October 2022 8	Bylisi Ballsh	0–1	Tirana	Adush Muça Stadium, Ballsh
15:00 CEST	Lajthia (yellow card) 37'; Kaçorri (yellow card) 45'; Trumçi (yellow card) 90+2'; Janku (yellow card) 90+8'	Report	Deliu (yellow card) 61'; Hasani 80'; Aleksi (yellow card) 89'; Hila (yellow card) 89'; Xhixha (yellow card) 90+1'; Hussein (yellow card) 90+8'	Referee: Klodjan Prenga (Laç)

22 October 2022 9	Tirana	0–1	Erzeni Shijak	Elbasan Arena, Elbasan
17:45 CEST	Aleksi (yellow card) 34'; Behiratche (yellow card) 79'; Patrick (yellow card) 88'	Report	Kahrimanović 15' (pen.); Mehmeti (yellow card) 60'; Avdiu (yellow card) 77'; Iljazi (yellow card) 79'	Referee: Dorjan Maletaj (Tropojë)

30 October 2022 10	Tirana	4–1	Kukësi	Selman Stërmasi Stadium, Tirana
14:00 CET	Hasani 43'; Aleksi (yellow card) 63'; Behiratche 72'; Patrick 81'; Limaj 87' (pen.)	Report	Ebert (yellow card) 23'; Baša 45+2'; Ndreca (red card) 59'; Tafa (yellow card) 82'	Referee: Andi Koçi (Durrës)

3 November 2022 11	Tirana	1–0	Egnatia	Selman Stërmasi Stadium, Tirana
13:00 CET	Patrick 52'; Bekaj (yellow card) 90+2'	Report	Malota (yellow card) 14'; Mëllugja (yellow card) 34'; Agbekpornu (yellow card) 59'	Referee: Orlando Kuka (Tirana)

13 November 2022 12	Vllaznia Shkodër	0–0	Tirana	Selman Stërmasi Stadium, Tirana
13:00 CET		Report		Referee: Olsion Yzeiraj (Patos)

12 December 2022 13	Tirana	4–0	Kastrioti Krujë	Selman Stërmasi Stadium, Tirana
13:00 CET	Xhixha 14'; Kallaku 36'; Patrick 45'; Nikqi 83'	Report	A. Selmani (yellow card) 5'	Referee: Enea Jorgji (Elbasan)

16 December 2022 14	Teuta Durrës	1–0	Tirana	Niko Dovana Stadium, Durrës
15:45 CET	Marku 65'; Beqja (yellow card) 72'	Report	Iseni (yellow card) 39'; Najdovski (yellow card) 68'; Deliu (yellow card) 71'; Bekaj (yellow card) 89'	Referee: Eldorjan Hamiti (Lezhë)

21 December 2022 15	Tirana	0–1	Partizani Tirana	Air Albania Stadium, Tirana
20:00 CET	Iseni (yellow card) 39'	Report	Skuka 4' (yellow card) 83'; Sota (yellow card) 41'; Mensah (yellow card) 80'	Referee: Eldorjan Hamiti (Lezhë)

13 January 2023 16	Laçi	1–2	Tirana	Laçi Stadium, Laç
13:00 CET	Shkurtaj 2'; Borysiuk (yellow card) 30'; Ziko (yellow card) 45'	Report	Lulaj 45+3' (yellow card) 45+3'; Hasani 47'; Deliu (yellow card) 83'	Referee: Andi Koçi (Durrës)

21 January 2023 17	Tirana	4–1	Bylisi Ballsh	Air Albania Stadium, Tirana
16:00 CET	Hasani 10' (pen.); Patrick 27' 30' 69'; Najdovski (yellow card) 36'; Deliu (yellow card) 38'	Report	Souza 61'	Referee: Klodjan Prenga (Laç)

26 January 2023 18	Erzeni Shijak	0–2	Tirana	Niko Dovana Stadium, Durrës
19:00 CET	Nonato (yellow card) 51'; Iljazi (yellow card) 62'	Report	Gjumsi (yellow card) 58'; Hasani 83' (pen.) 90+5'; Hila (yellow card) 88'	Referee: Enea Jorgji (Elbasan)

29 January 2023 19	Kukësi	2–0	Tirana	Kukës Arena, Kukës
13:00 CET	Ebert (yellow card) 18'; Owusu 31'; Barbosa (yellow card) 55'; Bytyçi 58'; Halimi (yellow card) 85'	Report	Deliu (yellow card) 11'; Najdovski (yellow card) 30'	Referee: Eldorjan Hamiti (Lezhë)

6 February 2023 20	Egnatia	1–2	Tirana	Rrogozhinë Stadium, Rrogozhinë
13:00 CET	Dwamena 10'; Kacbufi (yellow card) 30'; Atanda (yellow card) 52'; Zejnullai (yellow card) 60'; Emsis (yellow card) 90+1'	Report	Përgjoni 1'; Aleksi (yellow card) 23'; Hasani 67' (pen.); Nikqi (yellow card) 90+13'	Referee: Olsion Yzeiraj (Patos)

12 February 2023 21	Tirana	0–1	Vllaznia Shkodër	Loro Boriçi Stadium, Shkodër
16:00 CET	Përgjoni (yellow card) 83'; Hasani (yellow card) 90+8'	Report	Marku 51' (pen.); Hakaj (yellow card) 69'	Referee: Enea Jorgji (Elbasan)

19 February 2023 22	Kastrioti Krujë	0–1	Tirana	Kamëz Stadium, Kamëz
13:00 CET	Rami (yellow card) 35'; Çela (red card) 83'; Stojanović (yellow card) 89'; Mihana (yellow card) 90+3'	Report	Haxhiu (yellow card) 58'; Aleksi (red card) 83'; Nikqi 90+10'	Referee: Juxhin Xhaja (Tirana)

25 February 2023 23	Tirana	0–2	Teuta Durrës	Air Albania Stadium, Tirana
16:00 CET		Report	E. Vila 11' 79'; Gruda (yellow card) 45+1' (yellow-red card) 73'	Referee: Kridens Meta (Tirana)

6 March 2023 24	Partizani Tirana	2–0	Tirana	Air Albania Stadium, Tirana
19:00 CET	Mba 20' (yellow card) 45+5'; Cara 80' (yellow card) 86'; Rexhepi (yellow card) 84'	Report	Aleksi (yellow card) 45+4'; Najdovski (yellow card) 63'	Referee: Juxhin Xhaja (Tirana)

11 March 2023 25	Tirana	3–2	Laçi	Elbasan Arena, Elbasan
19:00 CET	Hasani 5' 19'; Lulaj 45+3'; Iseni (yellow card) 71'	Report	Ujka (yellow card) 29' (goal) 90+3'; Spahiu (yellow card) 54'; Guindo 55' (pen.)	Referee: Kridens Meta (Tirana)

18 March 2022 26	Bylisi Ballsh	1–1	Tirana	Adush Muça Stadium, Ballsh
13:00 CET	Kaçorri (yellow card) 41'; Esquerdinha (yellow card) 52' (goal) 65'; Zguro (yellow card) 86'	Report	Damchevski 90+2' (o.g.)	Referee: Enea Jorgji (Elbasan)

2 April 2023 27	Tirana	3–1	Erzeni Shijak	Elbasan Arena, Elbasan
18:00 CEST	Hasani 48' 75' 89'; Najdovski (yellow card) 68'	Report	Mehmeti (yellow card) 11'; Enck 72' (yellow card) 84'	Referee: Orlando Kuka (Tirana)

10 April 2023 28	Tirana	2–1	Kukësi	Elbasan Arena, Elbasan
18:00 CEST	Hila 42'; Aleksi (yellow card) 50'; Hasani 89' (pen.) (yellow card) 90+7'	Report	Rashiti 51'; Ndreca (yellow card) 78'	Referee: Laver Alla (Lushnjë)

16 April 2023 29	Tirana	2–1	Egnatia	Elbasan Arena, Elbasan
18:00 CEST	Abazaj 37' 57'; Hasani (yellow card) 48'; Behiratche (yellow card) 56'	Report	Mëllugja (yellow card) 10'; Kasa 22'; Atanda (yellow card) 59'; Fernando (yellow card) 64'	Referee: Olsid Ferataj (Patos)

22 April 2023 30	Vllaznia Shkodër	0–1	Tirana	Loro Boriçi Stadium, Shkodër
18:00 CEST		Report	Toshevski (yellow card) 36'; Abazaj 43'; Behiratche (yellow card) 87'; Najdovski (yellow card) 90+6'	Referee: Kreshnik Cjapi (Fier)

30 April 2023 31	Tirana	1–0	Kastrioti Krujë	Elbasan Arena, Elbasan
15:00 CEST	Gjumsi (yellow card) 51'; Abazaj (yellow card) 79'; Hila 90'; Bekaj (yellow card) 90+3'; Deliu (yellow card) 90+5'	Report	Mehmeti (yellow card) 43'; Karakaçi (yellow card) 45' (yellow-red card) 90+3'; Sali (yellow card) 85'; A. Selmani (red card) 90+3'	Referee: Olsion Yzeiraj (Patos)

6 May 2023 32	Teuta Durrës	2–1	Tirana	Niko Dovana Stadium, Durrës
18:00 CEST	Goxha (yellow card) 38'; Gjinollari (yellow card) 50'; Qaqi (yellow card) 56'; E. Vila 64'; L. Vila 73'	Report	Hasani (yellow card) 27'; Behiratche (yellow card) 36' (red card) 81'; Hila (yellow card) 45+1'; Haxhiu 52'	Referee: Eldorjan Hamiti (Lezhë)

17 May 2023 33	Tirana	1–1	Partizani Tirana	Air Albania Stadium, Tirana
18:30 CEST	Najdovski (yellow card) 14'; Lushkja (yellow card) 32'; Aleksi (yellow card) 54'; Deliu 81'; Bekaj (yellow card) 90+2'; Toshevski (yellow card) 90+5'; Gjumsi (yellow card) 90+10'	Report	Da Silva 53'; Murataj (yellow card) 63'	Referee: Kreshnik Cjapi (Fier)

21 May 2023 34	Laçi	1–3	Tirana	Laçi Stadium, Laç
16:00 CEST	Bibo (yellow card) 56'; Guindo 90'	Report	Hasani 17'; Deliu (yellow card) 39'; Përgjoni (yellow card) 51'; Hila 65' (yellow card) 66' (goal) 72'; Lulaj (yellow card) 88'	Referee: Klodian Shahini (Durrës)

25 May 2023 35	Tirana	2–2	Bylisi Ballsh	Rrogozhinë Stadium, Rrogozhinë
16:00 CEST	Hila 22' 53' (yellow card) 54'; Aleksi (yellow card) 31'	Report	Danladi 27'; Adili (yellow card) 45+3' (goal) 80' (pen.); Esquerdinha (yellow card) 84'; Trumçi (yellow card) 90+2'; Maçolli (yellow card) 90+7'	Referee: Kridens Meta (Tirana)

29 May 2023 36	Erzeni Shijak	1–2	Tirana	Niko Dovana Stadium, Durrës
16:00 CEST	Iljazi (yellow card) 28'; Ademi 40'	Report	Behiratche (yellow card) 5'; Haxhiu 37'; Abazaj 90+7'	Referee: Olsid Ferataj (Patos)

=== Albanian Cup ===
28 September 2022 First round	Veleçiku Koplik	0–3	Tirana	Kompleksi Vëllezërit Duli, Koplik
15:00 CEST	Rrustemaj (yellow card) 74'; Alfred Kaçaj (yellow card) 86'	Report	Hila 9'; Berisha 13'; Limaj 86' (pen.)	Referee: Ditmir Grimci (Shkodër)

12 October 2022 First round	Tirana	2–2 (5–2 agg.)	Veleçiku Koplik	Selman Stërmasi Stadium, Tirana
14:00 CEST	Zhivanaj 45+2' (pen.) 85'; Patrick (yellow card) 53'; Iseni (yellow card) 81'	Report	Hajdari 38' (pen.) 40'	Referee: Mirela Çemeri (Durrës)

17 January 2023 Second round	Lushnja	0–3	Tirana	Abdurrahman Roza Haxhiu Stadium, Lushnjë
13:00 CET	Magani (yellow card) 56'	Report	Patrick 10', 20'; Hila 23'	Referee: Olsid Ferataj (Patos)

2 February 2023 Second round	Tirana	1–0 (4–0 agg.)	Lushnja	Selman Stërmasi Stadium, Tirana
13:00 CET	Lushkja 58' (yellow card) 75'; Gjumsi (yellow card) 64'	Report	Isufi (yellow card) 75'	Referee: Ermal Gryka (Tirana)

28 February 2023 Quarterfinals	Kastrioti Krujë	1–4	Tirana	Kamëz Stadium, Kamëz
13:00 CET	Karakaçi (yellow card) 8'; Hasani (yellow card) 14'; A. Selmani (yellow card) 21'; S. Selmani 57' (pen.); Reginaldo (yellow card) 90'	Report	Patrick (yellow card) 8' (goal) 46', 48'; Berisha 58'; Nikqi 72'	Referee: Klodian Shahini (Durrës)

14 March 2023 Quarterfinals	Tirana	2–2 (6–3 agg.)	Kastrioti Krujë	Selman Stërmasi Stadium, Tirana
13:00 CET	Hasani 13' (pen.); Najdovski 23'; Toshevski (yellow card) 45'; Tola (yellow card) 65'; Iseni (yellow card) 72'; Qefalija (yellow card) 78'	Report	Ajazi (yellow card) 21' (goal) 82' (pen.); Reginaldo (yellow card) 34'; Arapi (red card) 43'; Iseni 74' (o.g.)	Referee: Emanuela Rusta (Elbasan)

26 April 2023 Semifinals	Tirana	3–0	Teuta Durrës	Elbasan Arena, Elbasan
18:00 CEST	Hasani 43' (yellow card) 45+3'; Lulaj 65'; Lushkja 71'; Deliu (yellow card) 77'	Report	Beqja (yellow card) 77'	Referee: Olsid Ferataj (Patos)

10 May 2023 Semifinals	Teuta Durrës	0–0 (0–3 agg.)	Tirana	Niko Dovana Stadium, Durrës
17:00 CEST	Kotobelli (yellow card) 18'; Gjinollari (yellow card) 74'	Report	Toshevski (yellow card) 21'; Najdovski (yellow card) 83'; Gjumsi (yellow card) 89'	Referee: Kreshnik Cjapi (Fier)

1 June 2023 Final	Egnatia	1–0 (a.e.t.)	Tirana	Elbasan Arena, Elbasan
19:00 CEST	Mëllugja (yellow card) 4'; Jackson (yellow card) 34' (yellow-red card) 120+3' (goal) 114'; Malota (yellow card) 72'; Memolla (yellow card) 78'; Paulauskas (yellow card) 90+3'; Sherri (yellow card) 120'	Report	Najdovski (yellow card) 11'; Qefalija (yellow card) 19'; Berisha (red card) 25'; Behiratche (yellow card) 120+4'	Referee: Enea Jorgji (Elbasan)

=== UEFA Champions League ===
==== First qualifying round ====
6 July 2022 First leg	Diddeleng (Luxembourg)	1–0	(Albania) Tirana	Stade Jos Nosbaum, Dudelange (Luxembourg)
19:30 CEST	Kirch (yellow card) 29' (yellow-red card) 54'; Nader 71'	Report	Totre (yellow card) 62'; Limaj (yellow card) 65' (yellow-red card) 68'	Attendance: 1,555; Referee: Rohit Saggi (Norway)

12 July 2022 Second leg	Tirana (Albania)	1–2 (1–3 agg.)	(Luxembourg) Diddeleng	Arena Kombëtare, Tirana (Albania)
20:00 CEST	Aleksi (yellow card) 39'; Xhixha (yellow card) 69' (goal) 78'; Hasani (yellow card) 80'; Najdovski (yellow card) 81'; Ismailgeci (yellow card) 82'; Përgjoni (yellow card) 90+8'	Report	Stumpf (yellow card) 14'; Bojić 49'; Sinani 61' (yellow card) 62'; Ninte Junior (yellow card) 87'	Attendance: 6,000; Referee: Cesar Soto Grado (Spain)

=== UEFA Europa Conference League ===
==== Second qualifying round ====
19 July 2022 First leg	Tirana (Albania)	0–1	(Bosnia and Herzegovina) Zrinjski Mostar	Air Albania Stadium, Tirana (Albania)
20:00 CEST	Najdovski (yellow card) 52'	Report	Bilbija 12' (pen.); Janković (yellow card) 52'; Kamenar (yellow card) 68'	Attendance: 4,136; Referee: Loukas Sotiriou (Cyprus)

28 July 2022 Second leg	Zrinjski Mostar (Bosnia and Herzegovina)	3–2 (4–2 agg.)	(Albania) Tirana	Stadion pod Bijelim Brijegom, Mostar (Bosnia)
21:00 CEST	Janković 25'; Tičinović 36'; Jukić (yellow card) 52'; Ćuže 80'; Sučić (yellow card) 82'; Malekinušić (yellow card) 84'; Barišić (yellow card) 86'; Mandić (yellow card) 87'; Ilinković (yellow card) 88'	Report	Ismailgeci 51' (yellow card) 56'; Xhixha 83' (yellow card) 90'	Attendance: 5,000; Referee: Yasar Kemal Ugurlu (Turkey)

== Statistics ==
=== Appearances and goals ===
No.	Pos	Nat	Player	Total		Kategoria Superiore		Albanian Cup		Champions League		Conference League		Albanian Supercup	
No.	Pos	Nat	Player	Apps	Goals	Apps	Goals	Apps	Goals	Apps	Goals	Apps	Goals	Apps	Goals
Goalkeepers
1	GK	(Albania) ALB	Ilion Lika	7	0	2	0	5	0	0	0	0	0	0	0
31	GK	(Albania) ALB	Tomas Kiri	2	0	0	0	0+2	0	0	0	0	0	0	0
97	GK	(Kosovo) KOS	Visar Bekaj	43	0	34	0	4	0	2	0	2	0	1	0
Defenders
2	DF	(North Macedonia) MKD	Kristijan Toshevski	34	0	22+2	0	6	0	2	0	2	0	0	0
4	DF	(North Macedonia) MKD	Besir Iseni	15	0	2+5	0	6+2	0	0	0	0	0	0	0
5	DF	(North Macedonia) MKD	Filip Najdovski	38	1	30	0	3	1	2	0	2	0	1	0
18	DF	(Albania) ALB	Florjan Përgjoni	42	1	28+4	1	6+1	0	0+1	0	0+1	0	1	0
20	DF	(Ivory Coast) CIV	Jocelin Behiratche	39	1	22+6	1	5+1	0	2	0	2	0	1	0
33	DF	(Albania) ALB	Ermal Meta	4	0	0	0	1+3	0	0	0	0	0	0	0
44	DF	(Albania) ALB	Bruno Lulaj	31	3	18+6	2	4+2	1	0	0	0	0	0+1	0
Midfielders
6	MF	(Albania) ALB	Albano Aleksi	41	0	32	0	4	0	2	0	2	0	1	0
10	MF	(Albania) ALB	Regi Lushkja	20	2	13+3	0	4	2	0	0	0	0	0	0
15	MF	(Albania) ALB	Jurgen Sina	2	0	0	0	2	0	0	0	0	0	0	0
21	MF	(Albania) ALB	Klevi Qefalija	22	0	3+9	0	4+2	0	0+2	0	1+1	0	0	0
22	MF	(Albania) ALB	Ardit Deliu	37	1	26+4	1	1+5	0	0	0	0	0	1	0
27	MF	(Albania) ALB	Ardit Hila	39	8	16+13	6	7+1	2	1	0	0	0	0+1	0
29	MF	(Brazil) BRA	Nicollas Gustavo	1	0	0	0	0+1	0	0	0	0	0	0	0
45	MF	(Albania) ALB	Alen Lutaj	1	0	0	0	1	0	0	0	0	0	0	0
55	MF	(Albania) ALB	Hajrulla Tola	7	0	0+1	0	3+3	0	0	0	0	0	0	0
66	MF	(Albania) ALB	Danilo Bajraktari	4	0	0+1	0	0+3	0	0	0	0	0	0	0
88	MF	(Albania) ALB	Alkejd Ajazi	2	0	0	0	0+2	0	0	0	0	0	0	0
99	MF	(Albania) ALB	Erlind Qehaja	1	0	0	0	0+1	0	0	0	0	0	0	0
Forwards
7	FW	(Albania) ALB	Elvi Berisha	25	2	2+14	0	8+1	2	0	0	0	0	0	0
9	FW	(Kosovo) KOS	Florent Hasani	42	19	34	16	3	2	0+2	0	1+1	0	1	1
14	FW	(Albania) ALB	Rimal Haxhiu	21	2	16+1	2	3+1	0	0	0	0	0	0	0
17	FW	(Albania) ALB	Aldi Gjumsi	25	0	3+14	0	5+2	0	0	0	0+1	0	0	0
24	FW	(Albania) ALB	Serxhio Tafa	3	0	0	0	1+2	0	0	0	0	0	0	0
30	FW	(Albania) ALB	Dijar Nikqi	27	3	5+16	2	4+2	1	0	0	0	0	0	0
77	FW	(Albania) ALB	Kristal Abazaj	14	5	9+5	5	0	0	0	0	0	0	0	0
98	FW	(Brazil) BRA	Patrick	27	11	18+4	6	2+2	4	0	0	0	0	1	1
Players transferred out during the season
8	MF	(North Macedonia) MKD	Ennur Totre	4	0	0	0	0	0	2	0	1+1	0	0	0
8	MF	(Albania) ALB	Sherif Kallaku	16	2	14+1	2	0	0	0	0	0	0	1	0
10	MF	(Germany) GER	Vesel Limaj	20	2	5+9	1	2	1	1	0	2	0	0+1	0
11	DF	(Albania) ALB	Arbër Bytyqi	3	0	0+1	0	1+1	0	0	0	0	0	0	0
14	DF	(Albania) ALB	Marsel Ismajlgeci	23	1	16+2	0	0	0	2	0	2	1	1	0
19	FW	(Albania) ALB	Redon Xhixha	22	14	17	11	0	0	2	1	2	1	1	1
24	DF	(Nigeria) NGR	Lukman Hussein	8	0	3+2	0	1+1	0	0	0	0+1	0	0	0
26	DF	(Albania) ALB	Marlind Nuriu	1	0	0	0	0	0	0	0	0+1	0	0	0
27	FW	(Brazil) BRA	Devid	4	0	0	0	0	0	2	0	1+1	0	0	0
33	DF	(Albania) ALB	Realf Zhivanaj	5	2	2+1	0	2	2	0	0	0	0	0	0
99	FW	(Albania) ALB	Taulant Seferi	5	0	1	0	0	0	2	0	2	0	0	0

Source: Competitions
