= 2020–21 Albanian Cup =

Kupa e Shqipërisë

Tournament details
- Country: Albania
- Teams: 32

Final positions
- Champions: Vllaznia (7th title)
- Runners-up: Skënderbeu

Tournament statistics
- Matches played: 31
- Goals scored: 100 (3.23 per match)
- Top goal scorer(s): Alfred Mensah; Haris Dilaver; Kyrian Nwabueze (4 goals each)

2020–21 Albanian Cup (Albanian: Kupa e Shqipërisë) was the sixty-ninth season of Albania's annual cup competition, the Albanian Cup. Teuta were the defending champions. Vllaznia won the cup, their seventh title in the competition.

== Format ==
Unlike the previous season, all ties are played in a one-leg format, due to a congested schedule. If the score is tied after the regular time, the match is decided by extra time and a penalty shoot-out, if necessary. The preliminary round did not take place.

== First round ==
All 27 eligible teams of the 2020–21 Kategoria Superiore and Kategoria e Parë entered in this round along with 5 teams from the Kategoria e Dytë. The matches were played on 1 November 2020.

Team 1	Score	Team 2
Tirana (I)	4−1	Shkumbini (III)
Laçi (I)	3−0	Vora (II)
Teuta (I)	4−0	Tërbuni (III)
Bylis (I)	2−1	Veleçiku (II)
Flamurtari (II)	1−2	Dinamo Tirana (II)
Kastrioti (I)	2−1	Burreli (II)
Besëlidhja (II)	1−1 (a.e.t.) (3−4 p)	Egnatia (II)
Korabi (II)	2−0	Erzeni (II)
Kukësi (I)	5−0	Maliqi (III)
Skënderbeu (I)	1−0	Tomori (II)
Partizani (I)	5−0	Iliria (III)
Vllaznia (I)	7−0	Devolli (III)
Luftëtari (II)	0−3	Elbasani (II)
Apolonia (I)	4−1	Turbina (II)
Pogradeci (II)	9−1	Oriku (II)
Lushnja (II)	0−1 (a.e.t.)	Besa (II)

1 November 2020	Tirana	4−1	Shkumbini	Skënder Halili Complex, Tirana
13:30 CET	Ramazani 26' (o.g.); Vrapi 39'; Muçi 41', 73'		Mustafaj 52' (pen.)	Referee: Xhulio Agolli

Tirana advanced to the second round.

1 November 2020	Laçi	3−0	Vora	Laçi Stadium, Laç
13:30 CET	Nwabueze 6', 46'; Malota 18'			Referee: Florjan Lata

Laçi advanced to the second round.

1 November 2020	Teuta	4−0	Tërbuni	Olympic Park, Durrës
13:30 CET	Jazxhi 37'; Kapllani 38'; Gruda 52'; Vila 54'			Referee: Qazim Copa

Teuta advanced to the second round.

1 November 2020	Bylis	2−1	Veleçiku	Adush Muça Stadium, Ballsh
13:30 CET	Lika 12'; Trumçi 34'		Shekaj 90+3'	Referee: Elidon Halo

Bylis advanced to the second round.

1 November 2020	Flamurtari	1−2	Dinamo Tirana	Flamurtari Stadium, Vlorë
13:30 CET	Mukoj 75'		Djidjiwa 68'; Maranhão 90' (pen.)	Referee: Laver Alla

Dinamo Tirana advanced to the second round.

1 November 2020	Kastrioti	2−1	Burreli	Redi Maloku Stadium, Fushë-Krujë
13:30 CET	Shkalla 55'; Okebugwu 82'		Mallunxa 75'	Referee: Klodjan Prenga

Kastrioti advanced to the second round.

1 November 2020	Besëlidhja	1−1 (a.e.t.) (3–4 p)	Egnatia	Brian Filipi Stadium, Lezhë
13:30 CET	Hoxha 66'		Magani 61'	Referee: Olsion Yzeiraj

Egnatia advanced to the second round.

1 November 2020	Korabi	2−0	Erzeni	Korabi Stadium, Peshkopi
13:30 CET	Skuka 68'; Xhebrahimi 84' (pen.)			Referee: Bekris Dragusha

Korabi advanced to the second round.

1 November 2020	Kukësi	5−0	Maliqi	Football Republic, Barbas
13:30 CET	Gavazaj 2'; Kotobelli 27'; Eze 65' (pen.), 82'; Ibraimi 78' (pen.)			Referee: Besnard Kaimi

Kukësi advanced to the second round.

1 November 2020	Skënderbeu	1−0	Tomori	Skënderbeu Stadium, Korçë
13:30 CET	Mensah 25'			Referee: Erald Demiraj

Skënderbeu advanced to the second round.

1 November 2020	Partizani	5−0	Iliria	Sopoti Stadium, Librazhd
13:30 CET	Solomon 22', 57'; Asani 38' (pen.); Broja 52'; Cordeiro 68'			Referee: Silvio Dyrmishi

Partizani advanced to the second round.

1 November 2020	Vllaznia	7−0	Devolli	Loro Boriçi Stadium, Shkodër
13:30 CET	Dilaver 6', 36', 65'; Imeri 11'; Marku 27' (pen.); Isaevski 57'; Jonuzi 63'			Referee: Edvin Hoxha

Vllaznia advanced to the second round.

1 November 2020	Luftëtari	0−3; Awarded	Elbasani	Gjirokastra Stadium, Gjirokastër
13:30 CET

Elbasani advanced to the second round.

1 November 2020	Apolonia	4−1	Turbina	Fusha Sportive Apolonia, Fier
13:30 CET	Yeboah 23'; Gjata 26' (pen.); Mihana 48'; Eyoh 88'		Sallaku 83'	Referee: Endrit Zhuli

Apolonia advanced to the second round.

1 November 2020	Pogradeci	9−1	Oriku	Gjorgji Kyçyku Stadium, Pogradec
13:30 CET	Abazaj 2', 63'; Dragoj 4' (pen.), 14'; Topllari 10'; Kasa 25'; Tako 37'; Balla 72'; Toma 85'		Shaba 59'	Referee: Olsi Sokoli

Pogradeci advanced to the second round.

1 November 2020	Lushnja	0−1 (a.e.t.)	Besa	Roza Haxhiu Stadium, Lushnjë
13:30 CET			Kainã 115'	Referee: Klodian Shahini

Besa advanced to the second round.

== Second round ==
All the 16 qualified teams from the First Round progressed to the Second Round and The matches were played on 12, 13 and 14 November 2020.

Team 1	Score	Team 2
Tirana (I)	0−1 (a.e.t.)	Korabi (II)
Laçi (I)	3−1 (a.e.t.)	Egnatia (II)
Teuta (I)	5−0	Kastrioti (I)
Bylis (I)	1−2 (a.e.t.)	Dinamo Tirana (II)
Kukësi (I)	2−1	Besa (II)
Skënderbeu (I)	3−0	Pogradeci (II)
Partizani (I)	1−0	Apolonia (I)
Vllaznia (I)	8−0	Elbasani (II)

12 November 2020	Tirana	0−1 (a.e.t.)	Korabi	Skënder Halili Complex, Tirana
13:30 CET			Skuka 119'	Referee: Albert Doda

Korabi advanced to the quarter finals.

14 November 2020	Laçi	3−1 (a.e.t.)	Egnatia	Laçi Stadium, Laç
13:30 CET	Teco 85'; Nwabueze 107' (pen.), 118'		Jackson 25'	Referee: Hermal Llapra

Laçi advanced to the quarter finals.

12 November 2020	Teuta	5−0	Kastrioti	Niko Dovana Stadium, Durrës
13:30 CET	Arapi 13'; Bregu 29'; Iran Junior 72'; Vila 84' (pen.); Gruda 86'			Referee: Laver Alla

Teuta advanced to the quarter finals.

12 November 2020	Bylis	1−2 (a.e.t.)	Dinamo Tirana	Adush Muça Stadium, Ballsh
13:30 CET	Anthony 8'		Djidjiwa 71'; Maranhão 114' (pen.)	Referee: Fatjon Xhemalaj

Dinamo Tirana advanced to the quarter finals.

12 November 2020	Kukësi	2−1	Besa	Internacional Complex, Pezë Helmës
13:30 CET	Limaj 67'; Ibraimi 73'		Koleci 8'	Referee: Mirela Cemeri

Kukësi advanced to the quarter finals.

12 November 2020	Skënderbeu	3−0	Pogradeci	Skënderbeu Stadium, Korçë
13:30 CET	Berisha 13'; Mensah 57', 66'			Referee: Silvio Dyrmishi

Skënderbeu advanced to the quarter finals.

12 November 2020	Partizani	1−0	Apolonia	Gjorgji Kyçyku Stadium, Pogradec
13:30 CET	Brown 19'			Referee: Blerim Ziri

Partizani advanced to the quarter finals.

13 November 2020	Vllaznia	8−0	Elbasani	Loro Boriçi Stadium, Shkodër
13:30 CET	Dilaver 4'; Imeri 15' (pen.), 40'; Dunga 29'; Mandiangu 67'; Çoba 76' da Silva 83', 88'			Referee: Endrit Zhuli

Vllaznia advanced to the quarter finals.

== Quarter-finals ==
All eight qualified teams from the second round progressed to the quarter-finals. The matches were played on 17 March 2021.

Team 1	Score	Team 2
Laçi (I)	0−0 (a.e.t.) (4−3 p)	Partizani (I)
Vllaznia (I)	1−0	Korabi (II)
Teuta (I)	1−0	Kukësi (I)
Dinamo Tirana (II)	1−3	Skënderbeu (I)

17 March 2021	Laçi	0−0 (a.e.t.) (4−3 p)	Partizani	Laçi Stadium, Laç
13:00 CET				Referee: Kridens Meta
	Penalties
	Shehu (penalty scored); Musta (penalty missed); Deliu (penalty scored); Ignjatović (penalty scored); Mazrekaj (penalty scored)		(penalty scored) Çinari; (penalty scored) Mala; (penalty missed) Bardhi; (penalty missed) Cara; (penalty scored) Murataj

Laçi advanced to the semi finals.

17 March 2021	Vllaznia	1−0	Korabi	Loro Boriçi Stadium, Shkodër
16:00 CET	Kruja 16'			Referee: Blerim Ziri

Vllaznia advanced to the semi finals.

17 March 2021	Teuta	1−0	Kukësi	Niko Dovana Stadium, Durrës
16:00 CET	Vila 9'			Referee: Kreshnik Cjapi

Teuta advanced to the semi finals.

17 March 2021	Dinamo Tirana	1−3	Skënderbeu	Selman Stërmasi Stadium, Tirana
13:00 CET	Welber 63'		Mensah 21'; Berisha 43'; Pusi 58'	Referee: Mario Shabanaj

Skënderbeu advanced to the semi finals.

== Semi-finals ==
The matches were played on 14 April.

Team 1	Score	Team 2
Vllaznia (I)	1−0	Laçi (I)
Teuta (I)	0−2	Skënderbeu (I)

14 April 2021	Vllaznia	1−0	Laçi	Loro Boriçi Stadium, Shkodër
16:00 CEST	Hoxhaj 22'			Referee: Juxhin Xhaja

Vllaznia advanced to the final.

14 April 2021	Teuta	0−2	Skënderbeu	Niko Dovana Stadium, Durrës
16:00 CEST			Meksi 2' (pen.); Berisha 44'	Referee: Enea Jorgji

Skënderbeu advanced to the final.

== Final ==
31 May 2021
19:00 CEST

Skënderbeu	0−1	Vllaznia
		da Silva 39'

Arena Kombëtare, Tirana
Attendance: 1,000
Referee: Juxhin Xhaja
