= Dijar Nikqi =

Albanian footballer

Personal information
- Date of birth: 20 October 2004 (age 22)
- Place of birth: Peja, Kosovo under UN administration
- Height: 1.85 m (6 ft 1 in)
- Position: Centre-forward

Team information
- Current team: Liria Prizren
- Number: 27

Youth career
- 2 Korriku
- –2020: Futastic Football School
- 2020–2021: Laçi
- 2021–2022: Akademia e Futbollit
- 2022–2023: Tirana

Senior career*
Years	Team	Apps	(Gls)
2022–2024	Tirana	39	(6)
2023–2024	→ Teuta (loan)	3	(0)
2024–2025	Vora	8	(0)
2025–	Liria Prizren	11	(2)

International career^{‡}
2020	Kosovo U16	1	(0)
2021	Albania U18	1	(0)
2021–2023	Albania U21	5	(0)
- * Club domestic league appearances and goals as of 18 October 2023 ‡ National team caps and goals as of 27 March 2023

Dijar Nikqi (born 20 October 2004) is an Albanian professional footballer who plays as a centre-forward for Kosovo First League club Liria Prizren.

== Club career ==
=== Early career and Laçi ===
Nikqi is a product of youth team systems of the different Kosovan and Albanian sides. In the summer 2020 transfer window, he joined with Kategoria Superiore club Laçi. His debut with Laçi came on 1 November in the 2020–21 Albanian Cup first round against Vora after coming on as a substitute in the 57th minute in place of Kyrian Nwabueze.

=== Akademia e Futbollit ===
At the start of January 2021, Nikqi joined with Albanian club Akademia e Futbollit. His debut with Akademia e Futbollit came on 9 January in a 2020–21 Albanian U19 Cup match against Butrinti after being named in the starting line-up and scored his side's three goals during a 3–2 away win.

=== Tirana ===
At the start of January 2022, Nikqi joined with Kategoria Superiore club Tirana. His debut with Tirana came on 20 February against Kastrioti after coming on as a substitute in the 82nd minute in place of Redon Xhixha and scored his side's only goal during a 1–2 away defeat.

==== Loan to Teuta ====
In August 2023, Nikqi was sent on a six-month-long loan to Kategoria Superiore club Teuta, to replace the departed Lorenco Vila as the first choice. His debut with Teuta came on 2 September against his parent club Tirana after coming on as a substitute at 68th minute in place of Ergys Peposhi.

=== Vora ===
On 8 August 2024, Nikqi joined Kategoria e Parë side Vora. On 31 August 2024, he was named as a Vora substitute for the first time in a league match against Kukësi. His debut with Vora came twelve days later against Flamurtari after coming on as a substitute at 69th minute in place of Manfredas Ruzgis.

=== Liria Prizren ===
On 19 January 2025, Nikqi joined Kosovo First League club Liria Prizren.

== International career ==
On 21 July 2018, Nikqi was selected by the Peja selection of Kosovo U15. In October 2020, he received the Albanian passport and this paved the way for him to represent Albania. On 5 August 2021, Nikqi received a call-up from Albania U18 for the friendly match against Italy U18, and made his debut after being named in the starting line-up. Twenty-two days later, he received a call-up from Albania U21 for the UEFA Euro 2023 qualification match against Czech Republic, and made his debut after coming on as a substitute in the 46th minute in place of Bernard Karrica.

== Honours ==
=== Club ===
Tirana

- Kategoria Superiore: 2021–22
  - Runner-up: 2022–23
- Kupa e Shqipërisë
  - Runner-up: 2022–23
- Albanian Supercup: 2022
