= Realf Zhivanaj =

Albanian footballer

Personal information
- Date of birth: 15 March 1998 (age 28)
- Place of birth: Tirana, Albania
- Height: 1.85 m (6 ft 1 in)
- Position: Central defender

Team information
- Current team: Kastrioti
- Number: 33

Youth career
- 2008–2016: Dinamo Tirana

College career
Years	Team	Apps	(Gls)
2017	MSUB Yellowjackets	16	(4)
2018	St. Francis B. Terriers	7	(0)

Senior career*
Years	Team	Apps	(Gls)
2016–2017	Tirana	0	(0)
2019	Vora	6	(0)
2019–2020	Tërbuni Puke	20	(1)
2020–2021	Kastrioti	13	(0)
2021–2023	Tirana	16	(0)
2021–2023	→ Tirana U-21	2	(1)
2023	Dinamo City	7	(0)
2023–2024	Kastrioti	14	(0)

Managerial career
- 2025−: Partizani (assistant manager)
- 2025−: Partizani B
- * Club domestic league appearances and goals as of 4 May 2024

Realf Zhivanaj (born 15 March 1998) is an Albanian footballer who plays as a center back for Kastrioti.

== Club career ==
After spending 10 years at Tirana Academy, Zhivanaj had a season in American college soccer with Montana State Billings Yellowjackets, scoring 4 goals in 16 games. He then also had a few months with St. Francis Brooklyn Terriers before returning to Albania in 2019.

== Honours ==
=== Club ===
Tirana

- Kategoria Superiore (1) : 2021–22
- Albanian Supercup (2) :2017, 2022
