= Aldi Gjumsi =

Albanian association football player

Personal information
- Date of birth: 15 March 2002 (age 24)
- Place of birth: Tirana, Albania
- Height: 1.76 m (5 ft 9 in)
- Position: Forward

Team information
- Current team: Skënderbeu Korçë
- Number: 17

Youth career
- 2011–2020: Tirana

Senior career*
Years	Team	Apps	(Gls)
2020–2023	Tirana	47	(1)
2021–2022	→Tirana U-21	1	(0)
2023	Teuta Durrës	10	(0)
2024	Liria Prizren	15	(5)
2024–2025	Tirana	29	(0)
2025	→Tirana B	9	(5)
2026–	Skënderbeu Korçë	1	(0)

International career^{‡}
2021	Albania U20	2	(0)
- * Club domestic league appearances and goals as of 15 June 2024 ‡ National team caps and goals as of 14 September 2021

Aldi Gjumsi (born 15 March 2002) is an Albanian professional footballer who plays as a forward.

== Career statistics ==
=== Club ===
As of 14 September 2021.

== Honours ==
=== Club ===
Tirana

- Kategoria Superiore: 2021–22
  - Runner-up:2022–23
- Albanian Supercup: 2022
- Kupa e Shqipërisë
  - Runner-up:2022–23

Club	Season	League			Cup		Continental		Other		Total	
Club	Season	Division	Apps	Goals	Apps	Goals	Apps	Goals	Apps	Goals	Apps	Goals
Tirana	2020–21	Kategoria Superiore	4	1	1 (Note: Appearances in the Albanian Cup)	0	–		0	0	5	1
Tirana	2021–22	Kategoria Superiore	1	0	0	0	–		0	0	1	0
Career total			5	1	1	0	0	0	0	0	6	1
