= Florjan Përgjoni =

Albanian footballer

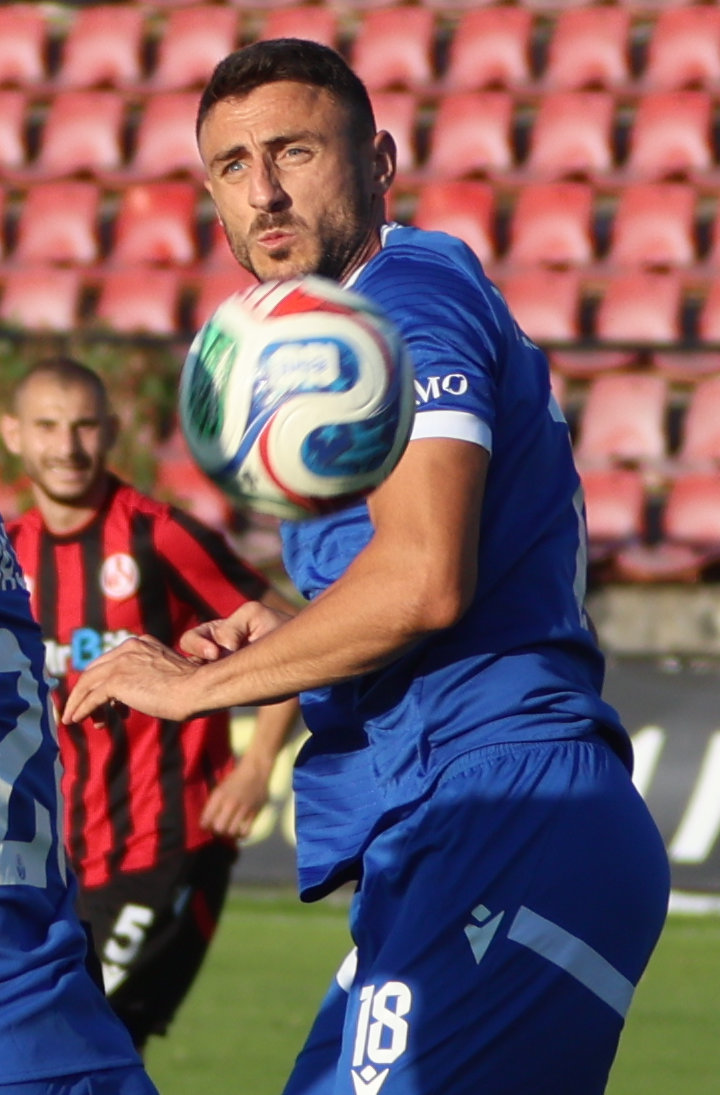

Personal information
- Full name: Florjan Përgjoni
- Date of birth: 22 June 1997 (age 29)
- Place of birth: Lezhë, Albania
- Height: 1.85 m (6 ft 1 in)
- Position: Left-back

Team information
- Current team: Teuta
- Number: 18

Youth career
- 2011–2012: Besëlidhja Lezhë
- 2012–2016: Shkëndija Durrës

Senior career*
| Years | Team | Apps | (Gls) |
| 2016–2018 | Besëlidhja Lezhë | 77 | (6) |
| 2018 | → Burreli (loan) | 8 | (0) |
| 2021–2025 | Tirana | 111 | (6) |
| 2025– | Teuta | 35 | (0) |
- * Club domestic league appearances and goals as of 13 May 2026

Florjan Përgjoni (born 22 June 1997) is an Albanian professional footballer who plays as a left-back for Teuta.

== Career ==
=== Tirana ===
Përgjoni signed a three-year contract with Kategoria Superiore side Tirana on 5 July 2021. He was an unused substitute in the club's opening two league games, and made his debut on 22 September 2021 in a Kupa e Shqipërisë game away at Shkumbini where he played the full game in the 3–0 win. He would make his league debut a few days later on 25 September 2021 in a 1–1 away draw to Kastrioti, where he came on as a 73rd-minute substitute for Macedonian defender Filip Najdovski. Përgjoni made his first league start for Tirana on 17 October 2021 in a thrilling 3–2 away win against the reigning Kategoria Superiore champions Teuta.

== Honours ==
=== Club ===
Tirana

- Kategoria Superiore: 2021–22
  - Runner-up:2022–23
- Albanian Supercup: 2022
- Kupa e Shqipërisë
  - Runner-up:2022–23
