= Lorougnon Doukouo =

Ivorian footballer

Personal information
- Full name: Lorougnon Henri Joel Doukouo
- Date of birth: 16 November 2002 (age 23)
- Place of birth: Ivory Coast
- Height: 1.81 m (5 ft 11 in)
- Position: Forward

Team information
- Current team: Egnatia
- Number: 14

Senior career*
| Years | Team | Apps | (Gls) |
| 2021–2022 | Al-Yarmouk | | |
| 2022– | Egnatia | 27 | (1) |
| 2022– | → Egnatia U21 | 19 | (15) |
- * Club domestic league appearances and goals as of 1 June 2024

Lorougnon Doukouo (born 16 November 2002) is an Ivorian professional footballer who plays as a forward for Albanian club Egnatia in the Kategoria Superiore.

== Career statistics ==
=== Club ===
As of 1 November 2023

| Club | Season | League | | | Cup | | Continental | | Other | | Total | |
| Club | Season | Division | Apps | Goals | Apps | Goals | Apps | Goals | Apps | Goals | Apps | Goals |
|---|---|---|---|---|---|---|---|---|---|---|---|---|
| Egnatia | 2022–23 | Kategoria Superiore | 6 | 0 | 3 | 0 | — | | — | | 9 | 0 |
| Egnatia | 2023–24 | Kategoria Superiore | 0 | 0 | 0 | 0 | — | | — | | 0 | 0 |
| Egnatia | Total | Kategoria Superiore | 6 | 0 | 3 | 0 | 0 | 0 | 0 | 0 | 9 | 0 |
| Egnatia U21 | 2022–23 | Kategoria Superiore U-21 | 17 | 15 | — | | — | | — | | 17 | 15 |
| Egnatia U21 | 2023–24 | Kategoria Superiore U-21 | 2 | 0 | — | | — | | — | | 2 | 0 |
| Egnatia U21 | Total | | 19 | 15 | 0 | 0 | 0 | 0 | 0 | 0 | 19 | 15 |
| Career Total | | | 97 | 45 | 7 | 7 | - | - | 0 | 0 | 104 | 52 |

== Honours ==
Egnatia

- Albanian Cup: 2022–23, 2023–24
