= Regi Lushkja =

Albanian footballer

Personal information
- Full name: Regi Lushkja
- Date of birth: 17 May 1996 (age 30)
- Place of birth: Kavajë, Albania
- Height: 1.84 m (6 ft 0 in)
- Position: Midfielder

Team information
- Current team: Al Dhafra

Youth career
- 2011–2014: Besa Kavajë

Senior career*
Years	Team	Apps	(Gls)
2014–2016	Besa Kavajë	30	(2)
2016–2022	Laçi	181	(21)
2022–2023	Sheriff Tiraspol	16	(2)
2023–2024	Tirana	51	(2)
2024–2025	Egnatia	34	(16)
2025–	Tractor	5	(2)

International career
2014	Albania U19	1	(0)
2017–2019	Albania U21	0	(0)
- * Club domestic league appearances and goals as of 18 October 2023

Regi Lushkja (born 17 May 1996) is an Albanian professional footballer who plays as a midfielder for Persian Gulf Pro League club Tractor.

== Club career ==
=== Early career ===
Lushkja started his youth career at Besa in 2011. During the 2012–13 season he played for the under-17 side managed by Ylli Teliti forming a strong duo striker partnership with Ardit Deliu, where in the first half of the season the duo scored 90% off all Besa Under-17 goals. He gained entry with the first team during the 2014–15 season where he soon established himself as a starter under coach Bledar Sinella playing 15 matches as a starter and 3 other as a substitute. In the next season he retained his starting place playing 12 matches and completing 10 as full-90 minutes.

=== Laçi ===
On 20 January 2016, Lushkja joined Laçi for an undisclosed fee. He made his competitive debut later on 7 February in a 0–3 home defeat to Tirana valid for the matchday 20.

=== Sheriff Tiraspol ===
On 2 February 2022, Lushkja joined Sheriff Tiraspol.

=== Tirana ===
On 10 January 2023, Lushkja officially signed with reigning Kategoria Superiore champions KF Tirana.

== International career ==
Lushkja has represented Albania at under-19 level, making his debut on 29 August 2014 in a friendly against Bulgaria.

Following injures of 3 players at Albania national under-21 football team, Qazim Laçi, Leonardo Maloku & Emanuele Ndoj during the gathering for the Friendly match against France U21 on 5 June 2017 and the 2019 UEFA European Under-21 Championship qualification opening match against Estonia U21 on 12 June 2017, coach Alban Bushi chose Lushkja among Agim Zeka as a replacement. He was not part of the 18-man squad which featured in the opening match of the qualifiers against Estonia U21.

== Career statistics ==
As of match played 12 April 2023

Club statistics
Club	Season	League			National cup (Note: Includes Albanian Cup, Moldovan Cup)		Europe		Other		Total	
Club	Season	Division	Apps	Goals	Apps	Goals	Apps	Goals	Apps	Goals	Apps	Goals
Besa Kavajë	2013–14	Kategoria e Parë	—		1	0	—		—		1	0
Besa Kavajë	2014–15	Kategoria e Parë	18	1	2	0	—		—		20	1
Besa Kavajë	2015–16	Kategoria e Parë	12	1	—		—		—		12	1
Besa Kavajë	Total		30	2	3	0	—		—		33	2
Laçi	2015–16	Kategoria Superiore	7	0	1	0	—		—		8	0
Laçi	2016–17	Kategoria Superiore	31	2	5	0	—		—		36	2
Laçi	2017–18	Kategoria Superiore	32	3	7	1	—		—		39	4
Laçi	2018–19	Kategoria Superiore	32	3	4	0	4	0	1 (Note: Appearance in Albanian Supercup)	1	41	4
Laçi	2019–20	Kategoria Superiore	32	4	1	0	2	0	—		35	4
Laçi	2020–21	Kategoria Superiore	33	5	3	0	2	0	—		38	5
Laçi	2021–22	Kategoria Superiore	17	6	4	0	6	2	—		27	8
Laçi	Total		184	23	25	1	14	2	1	1	224	27
Sheriff	2021–22	Divizia Națională	7	2	2	1	0	0	—		9	3
Sheriff	2022–23	Divizia Națională	9	0	0	0	5	0	—		14	0
Sheriff	Total		16	2	2	1	5	0	—		23	3
Tirana	2022–23	Kategoria Superiore	11	0	2	1	0	0	—		13	1
Career total			241	27	32	3	19	2	1	1	293	33

== Honours ==
Sheriff Tiraspol

- Moldovan National Division: 2021–22
- Moldovan Cup: 2021–22

Egnatia

- Kategoria Superiore: 2024–25
- Albanian Supercup: 2024
