= Akademia e Futbollit =

Albanian football club

- Full name: Akademia e Futbollit
- Nickname: Akademia
- Founded: September 22, 2015; 10 years ago
- Ground: National Sports Centre; Kamëz, Tirana
- Capacity: 500
- President: Alban Bushi
- League: Kategoria Superiore U-21
Home colours	Away colours

Akademia e Futbollit is an Albanian football academy based in Tirana. The academy was opened on 22 September 2015 by former Albania international Alban Bushi. They operate age groups between under-7s and under-21s. The club currently competes in the Kategoria Superiore U-21, the newly-formed under-21 top flight.

== Players ==
=== Notable former players ===
This is a list of Akademia e Futbollit players with senior national team appearances:

1. (Albania) Sherif Kallaku
2. (Albania) Indrit Tuci
