= Jocelin Behiratche =

Ivorian footballer

Personal information
- Date of birth: 8 May 2000 (age 26)
- Place of birth: Yamoussoukro, Ivory Coast
- Height: 1.86 m (6 ft 1 in)
- Position: Centre-back

Team information
- Current team: Slovácko

Youth career
- 2014–2020: Giorgione
- 2020: → Virtus Verona (loan)

Senior career*
Years	Team	Apps	(Gls)
2018–2020	Giorgione	0	(0)
2020–2023	Tirana	73	(3)
2020–2022	→Tirana U-21	6	(2)
2023–2024	Dinamo City	33	(0)
2024–2025	Sheriff Tiraspol	14	(1)
2025–2026	Oleksandriya	17	(0)
2026–	Slovácko	0	(0)
- * Club domestic league appearances and goals as of 3 June 2026

Jocelin Behiratche (born 8 May 2000) is an Ivorian professional footballer who plays as a centre-back for Czech First League club Slovácko.

== Career ==
On 10 June 2024, Sheriff Tiraspol announced the signing of Behiratchel. On 20 June 2025, Sheriff announced the departure of Behiratchel.

On 7 July 2025, Ukrainian Premier League club Oleksandriya, announced the signing of Behiratche on a contract until June 2027, with the option of an additional year.

On 10 July 2026, Behiratche signed a three-year contract with Czech First League club Slovácko.

== Honours ==
=== Club ===
Tirana

- Kategoria Superiore: 2021–22
  - Runner-up:2022–23
- Kupa e Shqipërisë
  - Runner-up:2022–23
- Albanian Supercup: 2022
