= Altin Bytyçi =

Kosovan footballer (born 2001)

Personal information
- Date of birth: 14 January 2001 (age 25)
- Place of birth: Suva Reka, Kosovo under UN administration
- Height: 1.88 m (6 ft 2 in)
- Position: Centre-back

Team information
- Current team: Partizani
- Number: 5

Youth career
- –2016: Ballkani
- 2016–2018: Kukësi
- 2018–2019: Laçi

Senior career*
Years	Team	Apps	(Gls)
2018	Kukësi	1	(0)
2018–2019	Laçi	0	(0)
2019–2020	Besa Pejë		
2020	Međimurje	0	(0)
2020–2023	Kukësi	80	(1)
2023–	Partizani Tirana	65	(2)

International career^{‡}
2019	Kosovo U19	5	(0)
- * Club domestic league appearances and goals as of 13 May 2026 ‡ National team caps and goals as of 3 November 2021

Altin Bytyçi (born 14 January 2001) is a Kosovan professional footballer who plays as a centre-back for Albanian club Partizani Tirana.

== Club career ==
=== Međimurje ===
On 30 January 2020, Bytyçi joined Croatian Second Football League side Međimurje. On 21 February 2020, he was named as a Međimurje substitute for the first time in a league match against Hrvatski Dragovoljac.

=== Return to Kukësi ===
On 12 September 2020, Bytyçi signed a three-year contract with Kategoria Superiore club Kukësi. His debut with Kukësi came on 1 November in the 2020–21 Albanian Cup first round against Maliqi after being named in the starting line-up. Seven days after debut, Bytyçi made his league debut in a 0–2 home defeat against Partizani Tirana after being named in the starting line-up.

== International career ==
=== Under-19 ===
On 20 May 2019, Bytyçi received a call-up from Kosovo U19 for the friendly matches against Albania U19. His debut with Kosovo U19 came fourteen days later in the first friendly match against Albania U19. Two days after debut, Bytyçi scored his first goal for Kosovo U19 in his second appearance for the country in a 1–4 defeat over Albania U19.

=== Under-21 ===
==== Albania ====
On 20 March 2021, Bytyçi received a call-up from Albania U21 for a training camp held from 22 to 30 March 2021 and for unofficial friendly matches against Tirana and Bylis.

==== Return to Kosovo ====
On 3 November 2021, Bytyçi received a call-up from Kosovo U21 for the 2023 UEFA European Under-21 Championship qualification match against Albania U21.
