= Visar Bekaj =

Kosovo-Albanian footballer (born 1997)

Personal information
- Full name: Visar Bekaj
- Date of birth: 24 May 1997 (age 29)
- Place of birth: Pristina, FR Yugoslavia
- Height: 1.90 m (6 ft 3 in)
- Position: Goalkeeper

Team information
- Current team: Tirana
- Number: 77

Youth career
- 2003–2013: Ramiz Sadiku
- 2013–2015: Prishtina

Senior career*
Years	Team	Apps	(Gls)
2014–2020	Prishtina	159	(0)
2020–2023	Tirana	103	(0)
2023–2026	Hatayspor	32	(0)
2026–	Tirana	24	(0)

International career^{‡}
2013	Albania U17	3	(0)
2017–2018	Kosovo U21	8	(0)
2015–	Kosovo	11	(0)
- * Club domestic league appearances and goals as of 14 May 2025 ‡ National team caps and goals as of 20:00, 7 June 2026 (UTC)

Visar Bekaj (born 24 May 1997) is a Kosovan professional footballer who plays as a goalkeeper for Albanian club Tirana and the Kosovo national team.

== Club career ==
=== Prishtina ===
==== 2019–20 season ====
On 27 June 2019, Bekaj commenced his fifth season with a draw in 2019–20 UEFA Europa League preliminary round match against Gibraltarian side St Joseph's after being named in the starting line-up.

===== Failure to join with 1899 Hoffenheim =====
On 4 July 2019, Prishtina through a communiqué stated that Bekaj, most likely in Gibraltar against St Joseph's has played his last official match with Prishtina and is soon expected to move to 1899 Hoffenheim. On 4 September 2019, Bota Sot confirms that Bekaj's transfer to 1899 Hoffenheim has failed after the German club request in TMS system to Prishtina was missing.

===== Return to Prishtina =====
Bekaj returned to Football Superleague of Kosovo side Prishtina, On 13 September 2019, he played the first game after the return against Llapi after being named in the starting line-up.

=== Tirana ===
On 29 August 2020, Bekaj signed a three-year contract with Kategoria Superiore club Tirana. His debut with Tirana came on 1 October in the 2020–21 UEFA Europa League play-off round against Young Boys after being named in the starting line-up.

== International career ==
=== Youth career and first senior call-up ===
In December 2012, Bekaj received a call-up from Albania U17 for a selection camp in Pristina, Kosovo from 3–4 December 2012. On 7 October 2015, he received a call-up from Kosovo for the friendly match against Equatorial Guinea. His debut with Kosovo came on 13 November in a friendly match against Albania after coming on as a substitute at 89th minute in place of captain Samir Ujkani.

=== Return to youth team ===
On 21 March 2017, Bekaj received a call-up from Kosovo U21 for a 2019 UEFA European Under-21 Championship qualification match against Republic of Ireland U21, and made his debut after being named in the starting line-up.

== Honours ==
Tirana

- Kategoria Superiore: 2021–22; runner-up: 2022–23
- Kupa e Shqipërisë runner-up: 2022–23
- Albanian Supercup: 2022
