= Alen Sherri =

Albanian footballer (born 1997)

Personal information
- Date of birth: 15 December 1997 (age 28)
- Place of birth: Shkodër, Albania
- Height: 1.97 m (6 ft 6 in)
- Position: Goalkeeper

Team information
- Current team: Cagliari
- Number: 12

Youth career
- 2012–2015: Vllaznia
- 2016: → Savona (loan)

Senior career*
Years	Team	Apps	(Gls)
2013–2020	Vllaznia	84	(0)
2016–2017	→ Vllaznia B	8	(0)
2016	→ Savona (loan)	0	(0)
2020–2022	Laçi	38	(0)
2022–2024	Egnatia	71	(0)
2024–	Cagliari	7	(0)
2025–2026	→ Frosinone (loan)	0	(0)

International career^{‡}
2015–2016	Albania U21	2	(0)
2022–	Albania	5	(0)
- * Club domestic league appearances and goals as of 24 January 2026 ‡ National team caps and goals as of 3 October 2026

Alen Sherri (born 15 December 1997) is an Albanian professional footballer who plays as a goalkeeper for Serie A club Cagliari and the Albania national team. He is noted for his aerial ability and distribution.

He developed at Vllaznia Shkodër, making his senior debut in April 2015, before playing for Laçi and Egnatia, with whom he won the Albanian Cup in 2023 and the domestic league and cup double in 2024. He joined Cagliari in July 2024.

Sherri represented Albania at under-21 level before making his senior international debut in November 2022, later becoming a regular squad member in 2024.

== Club career ==
=== Vllaznia ===
Sherri joined the youth academy of hometown club Vllaznia Shkodër in 2012, entering its under-17 team at age 14 before progressing through the youth ranks and winning the Albanian Under-19 Superliga in the 2013–14 season. He first joined the senior squad during the 2013–14 season, remaining an unused substitute in an Albanian Cup round of 32 match against Veleçiku on 6 November. He was also named on the bench for two Albanian Superliga matches, in December 2013 and March 2014, but made no senior appearances.

During the 2014–15 season, Sherri served as Vllaznia's backup goalkeeper, making seven league appearances. He made his professional debut on 12 April 2015 against Tirana, in a 2–1 defeat after Vllaznia took the lead before conceding twice in the second half while playing with ten men.

Sherri became Vllaznia's third-choice goalkeeper during the 2015–16 season following the arrival of Andrija Dragojević. In October 2015, he had a one-week trial with Roma, where he impressed the club's staff but was not signed because of restrictions on registering non-EU players. He subsequently made three league appearances and one Albanian Cup appearance for Vllaznia that season.

Following the arrival of Jasmin Agović in August 2016, manager Armando Cungu arranged for Sherri to join Savona, recently relegated from Serie D, on loan, but however, the proposed move did not materialise, and Sherri made no appearances for the Italian club. During the second-half of the 2016–17 season, Sherri made appearances for both Vllaznia's senior team and its reserve side in the Kategoria e Dytë.

During the 2017–18 season, Sherri established himself in Vllaznia's first team, making 26 appearances in the Kategoria Superiore and three in the Albanian Cup, earning praise for his performances under manager Ernest Gjoka, as the club finished ninth and were relegated.

During the 2018–19 season, Sherri made 21 appearances in the Kategoria e Parë as Vllaznia finished first in Group A of the promotion round and secured an immediate return to the Kategoria Superiore.

During the 2019–20 season, Sherri remained Vllaznia's first-choice in the Kategoria Superiore, making 27 league appearances and two in the Albanian Cup.

In August 2020, Sherri left the club to join fellow Albanian Superliga club Laçi, amid a dispute over his departure and the club's training compensation claims.

=== Laçi ===
On 9 August 2020, Sherri joined Laçi as a free agent. On 27 August, he saved the decisive penalty in a shoot-out victory over Keşla in the 2020–21 UEFA Europa League first qualifying round, sending Laçi through after a goalless draw. Laçi were eliminated in the following round after a 2–1 home defeat to Hapoel Be'er Sheva.

In the following season, Sherri featured in all six of Laçi's matches in the 2021–22 UEFA Europa Conference League qualifying campaign, helping the club reach the third round, where they were eliminated by Anderlecht.

He made 53 appearances across domestic and European competitions during his two seasons and announced his departure on 12 June 2022, thanking the club, staff, teammates and supporters for his time there.

=== Egnatia ===
On 13 June 2022, Sherri joined Egnatia on a two-year contract. He established himself as the first-choice goalkeeper, making 35 league appearances in his debut season and helping the club win the 2022–23 Albanian Cup, their first title in the competition, after a 1–0 victory over Tirana in the final on 1 June 2023.

During the 2023–24 season, Sherri made 36 league appearances as Egnatia won their first Albanian Superliga title and retained the Albanian Cup, completing the domestic double.

He left the club after 71 league appearances over two seasons to join Italian Serie A club Cagliari in July 2024.

=== Cagliari ===
On 24 July 2024, Sherri signed a three-year contract with Cagliari, initially serving as backup to Simone Scuffet. He made his debut on 24 September, keeping a clean sheet in a 1–0 Coppa Italia victory over Cremonese. He subsequently made six consecutive Serie A appearances as manager Davide Nicola rotated between him and Scuffet. Sherri made his league debut on 9 November in a 3–3 draw against Milan, becoming the first Albanian goalkeeper to play for Cagliari in the competition. He also played in a 2–2 draw against Genoa and kept a clean sheet in a 1–0 win over Hellas Verona, before conceding in defeats to Fiorentina (1–0), Atalanta (1–0) and Venezia (2–1). Scuffet regained his place in late December before joining Napoli on loan in January 2025, while Elia Caprile arrived as first choice, leaving Sherri as an unused substitute for the remainder of the league season, as Cagliari finished 15th and retained their Serie A status.

On 10 July 2025, Sherri joined Frosinone on loan in Serie B for the 2025–26 season, with an option to buy and a counter-option for Cagliari. He made his debut on 17 August in a 1–0 Coppa Italia victory over Monza, but suffered multiple facial fractures during the match, which sidelined him for several months.

The loan was terminated early on 4 January 2026, and he returned to Cagliari. He became the club's second-choice goalkeeper behind Caprile, replacing Boris Radunović after the latter joined Spezia on loan, but remained an unused substitute throughout the remainder of the 2025–26 Serie A season and Cagliari's opening league matches of the following campaign.

== International career ==
Sherri represented the Albania under-21 national team in 2015, making two appearances.

Sherri received his first call-up to the senior national team from head coach Edoardo Reja for two friendlies in June 2021, remaining an unused substitute in both matches. He made his senior international debut on 9 November 2022, coming on at half-time in a 1–0 friendly defeat to Qatar ahead of the latter's hosting of the 2022 FIFA World Cup.

Following Etrit Berisha's omission from the national team in 2024, Sherri became a regular member of Albania's squads under head coach Sylvinho, serving as a backup goalkeeper during the 2024–25 UEFA Nations League B and the first half of the 2026 FIFA World Cup qualifiers, without making an appearance.

Following the appointment of Rolando Maran as head coach, Sherri returned to the national squad for friendlies against Luxembourg in June 2026, replacing injured first-choice goalkeeper Thomas Strakosha, starting both matches and playing the full 90 minutes in each. However, following Berisha's return to the national team, Sherri again served as backup despite Strakosha's continued absence, making his fifth senior appearance on 3 October as a substitute for forward Arbër Hoxha in the 25th minute of Albania's 2026–27 UEFA Nations League C match against Finland following Berisha's dismissal, conceding from the resulting free kick and receiving a yellow card for unsporting behaviour in a 2–1 defeat.

== Style of play ==
Standing at 1.97 metres tall, he is noted for his aerial ability and distribution.

== Career statistics ==
=== Club ===
As of match played 17 August 2025

Appearances and goals by club, season and competition
Club	Season	League			Cup		Europe (Note: Including continental competitions, such as UEFA Champions League and UEFA Europa League)		Other (Note: Including other competitions, such as Albanian Supercup)		Total	
Club	Season	Division	Apps	Goals	Apps	Goals	Apps	Goals	Apps	Goals	Apps	Goals
Vllaznia Shkodër	2013–14	Albanian Superliga	0	0	0	0	—		—		0	0
Vllaznia Shkodër	2014–15	Albanian Superliga	7	0	0	0	—		—		7	0
Vllaznia Shkodër	2015–16	Albanian Superliga	3	0	2	0	—		—		5	0
Vllaznia Shkodër	2017–18	Albanian Superliga	26	0	3	0	—		—		29	0
Vllaznia Shkodër	2018–19	Albanian First Division	21	0	0	0	—		—		21	0
Vllaznia Shkodër	2019–20	Albanian Superliga	27	0	2	0	—		—		29	0
Vllaznia Shkodër	Total		84	0	7	0	—		—		91	0
Vllaznia Shkodër B	2015–16	Albanian Third Division	3	0	—		—		—		3	0
Vllaznia Shkodër B	2016–17	Albanian Second Division	3	0	—		—		—		3	0
Vllaznia Shkodër B	2017–18	Albanian First Division	2	0	—		—		—		2	0
Vllaznia Shkodër B	Total		8	0	—		—		—		8	0
Laçi	2020–21	Albanian Superliga	35	0	4	0	2	0	—		41	0
Laçi	2021–22	Albanian Superliga	3	0	3	0	6	0	—		12	0
Laçi	Total		38	0	7	0	8	0	—		53	0
Egnatia	2022–23	Albanian Superliga	35	0	5	0	—		—		40	0
Egnatia	2023–24	Albanian Superliga	34	0	6	0	2	0	3	0	45	0
Egnatia	2024–25	Albanian Superliga	—		—		2	0	—		2	0
Egnatia	Total		69	0	11	0	4	0	3	0	87	0
Cagliari	2024–25	Serie A	7	0	1	0	—		—		8	0
Cagliari	2025–26	Serie A	0	0	—		—		—		0	0
Cagliari	Total		7	0	1	0	—		—		8	0
Frosinone (loan)	2025–26	Serie B	0	0	1	0	—		—		1	0
Career total			206	0	27	0	12	0	3	0	248	0

=== International ===
As of match played 3 October 2026

Appearances and goals by national team and year
National team	Year	Apps	Goals
Albania
Albania	2022	1	0
Albania	2023	0	0
Albania	2024	0	0
Albania	2025	0	0
Albania	2026	4	0
Total		5	0

== Honours ==
Egnatia

- Kategoria Superiore: 2023–24
- Albanian Cup: 2022–23, 2023–24
