= Arbër Bytyqi =

Albanian footballer

Personal information
- Date of birth: 16 October 2003 (age 23)
- Place of birth: Prizren, Kosovo under UN administration
- Height: 1.80 m (5 ft 11 in)
- Positions: Right back; central midfielder

Team information
- Current team: Dukagjini
- Number: 19

Youth career
- –2019: Liria
- 2019–2020: Laçi

Senior career*
Years	Team	Apps	(Gls)
2019–2022	Laçi	17	(0)
2022–2023	Tirana	4	(0)
2023–2026	Llapi	63	(0)
2026–	Dukagjini	7	(0)

International career
2019–2020	Albania U17	2	(0)
2022	Albania U19	3	(0)
- * Club domestic league appearances and goals as of 11 October 2026

Arbër Bytyqi (born 16 October 2003) is a professional footballer who plays as a right back and central midfielder for Dukagjini. Born in Kosovo, he represented Albania at youth level.

== Career ==
=== Laçi ===
Born in Prizren, modern-day Kosovo, Bytyqi joined Albanian club Laçi in 2019 where he would initially play for the club's under-17 and under-19 sides. After impressive displays for the club's youth sides, he was called up to the first team by head coach Armando Cungu and was an unused substitute in their 2–1 home loss to Tirana on 22 December 2019. He would go on to make his professional debut on towards the end of the 2019–20 Kategoria Superiore season in a 3–1 home win against Luftëtari on 11 July 2020, coming on as an 83rd-minute substitute for Rudolf Turkaj.

== Honours ==
Tirana

- Kategoria Superiore: 2021–22
- Albanian Supercup: 2022
