= Herald Marku =

Albanian footballer

Personal information
- Date of birth: 18 May 1996 (age 30)
- Place of birth: Laç, Albania
- Height: 1.88 m (6 ft 2 in)
- Position: Midfielder

Team information
- Current team: Flamurtari
- Number: 21

Youth career
- 2011–2012: Dinamo Tirana
- 2012–2014: Partizani

Senior career*
Years	Team	Apps	(Gls)
2013–2016	Partizani	1	(0)
2015–2016	→ Tërbuni (loan)	23	(1)
2016–2017	Ludwigsfelder FC		
2017–2018	1. FC Frankfurt II		
2018	Ludwigsfelder FC		
2018–2019	Kastrioti	23	(5)
2019–2021	Vllaznia	63	(4)
2021–2022	Partizani	27	(2)
2022–2023	Vllaznia	35	(7)
2023–2024	UTA Arad	13	(0)
2024–	Flamurtari	58	(8)

International career^{‡}
2022–	Albania	1	(0)
- * Club domestic league appearances and goals as of 13 May 2026 ‡ National team caps and goals as of 9 November 2022

Herald Marku (born 18 May 1996) is an Albanian professional footballer who plays as a midfielder for Albanian club Flamurtari.

== Club career ==
On 17 June 2021, Partizani announced to have signed Marku on a two-year contract.

On 29 June 2022, Marku joined Vllaznia by signing a one-year contract with an option of another one, thus returning to the club.

On 12 July 2023, Marku joined Romanian club UTA Arad, on a contract valid for the next two seasons.

== International career ==
=== Albania U17 ===
Marku received his first Albania under-17 call-up by manager Džemal Mustedanagić for a friendly tournament developed in August 2012 in Romania.

== Career statistics ==
As of 9 November 2022

National team	Year	Apps	Goals
Albania	2022	1	0
Total		1	0

== Honours ==
Vllaznia

- Albanian Cup: 2020–21
- Albanian Supercup runner-up: 2022
