= Besir Iseni =

Macedonian professional footballer

Personal information
- Date of birth: 2 May 2000 (age 26)
- Place of birth: Skopje, Macedonia
- Height: 1.88 m (6 ft 2 in)
- Position: Centre-back

Team information
- Current team: Livingston
- Number: 21

Youth career
- Beshiktash Çair
- Shkupi

Senior career*
Years	Team	Apps	(Gls)
2020–2021	Vëllazërimi		
2021–2022	Struga	16	(0)
2022–2023	Tirana	7	(0)
2023–2026	Dukagjini	62	(1)
2026–	Livingston	0	(0)

International career
2021–2022	Macedonia U21	2	(0)
- * Club domestic league appearances and goals as of 22 June 2026

Besir Iseni (born 2 May 2000) is a Macedonian professional footballer who plays as a centre-back for Scottish Premiership club Livingston.

He previously played for Kosovo Superleague club Dukagjini and, after attracting interest from Hibernian and other clubs in Scotland and Croatia, signed a two-year deal with Livingston upon the expiry of his Dukagjini contract.

== Honours ==
=== Club ===
Tirana

- Albanian Supercup
  - Winner: 2022
- Albanian Cup
  - Runner-up: 2023
