= Leon Kozi =

Albanian footballer

Personal information
- Date of birth: 4 February 2003 (age 23)
- Place of birth: Tirana, Albania
- Position: Goalkeeper

Youth career
- 2011–2012: Ali Demi
- 2012–2014: Tirana
- 2014–2015: Rinia EL
- 2015–2017: Internacional Tirana
- 2017–2019: Dinamo Tirana
- 2019–2021: Tirana

Senior career*
Years	Team	Apps	(Gls)
2021–2025	Tirana	15	(0)
2021–2023	→Tirana U–21	12	(0)
2023	→ Drenica (loan)	3	(0)

International career^{‡}
2021	Albania U19	1	(0)
- * Club domestic league appearances and goals as of 21 December 2023 ‡ National team caps and goals as of 21 December 2023

Leon Kozi (born 4 February 2003) is an Albanian professional footballer who plays as a goalkeeper for Kategoria Superiore club Tirana.

== Honours ==
=== Club ===
Tirana

- Kategoria Superiore: 2021–22
  - Runner-up: 2022–23
- Kupa e Shqipërisë
  - Runner-up: 2022–23
- Albanian Supercup: 2022
