= Armando Rami =

Albanian footballer

Personal information
- Date of birth: 24 September 1997 (age 29)
- Place of birth: Burrel, Albania
- Height: 1.77 m (5 ft 10 in)
- Position: Defender

Youth career
- –2017: Kukësi

Senior career*
Years	Team	Apps	(Gls)
2017–2019	Kamza	1	(0)
2019–2023	Kastrioti	109	(2)
2023–2024	AF Elbasani	13	(0)
- * Club domestic league appearances and goals as of 24 January 2024

Armando Rami (born 24 September 1997) is an Albanian footballer who plays as a defender.

== Career ==
=== Kastrioti ===
In January 2019, Rami signed with Kastrioti in the Albanian Superliga. He made his debut for the club on 27 January 2019, coming on as a 76th-minute substitute for Lukman Hussein in a 5–1 away victory over Luftëtari. In this match, Rami also scored his first goal for the club, netting in the 86th minute and making the score 4–1 to Kastrioti.

== Career statistics ==
=== Club ===
As of match played 17 November 2021

Appearances and goals by club, season and competition
Club	Season	League			Cup		Other		Total	
Club	Season	Division	Apps	Goals	Apps	Goals	Apps	Goals	Apps	Goals
Kamza	2017–18	Albanian Superliga	0	0	3 (Note: Appearance(s) in Albanian Cup)	0	—	—	3	0
Kamza	2018–19	Albanian Superliga	1	0	1	0	—	—	2	0
Kamza	Total		1	0	4	0	—	—	5	0
Kastrioti	2018–19	Albanian Superliga	2	1	2	0	—	—	4	1
Kastrioti	2019–20	Kategoria e Parë	18	0	1	0	1 (Note: Appearance(s) in Kategoria e Parë championship final)	0	20	0
Kastrioti	2020–21	Albanian Superliga	30	0	1	0	—	—	31	0
Kastrioti	2021–22	Albanian Superliga	8	1	4	0	—	—	12	1
Kastrioti	Total		58	2	8	0	1	0	67	2
Career total			59	2	12	0	1	0	72	2
