= Klevi Qefalija =

Albanian footballer

Personal information
- Date of birth: 12 December 2003 (age 22)
- Place of birth: Tirana, Albania
- Height: 1.74 m (5 ft 8 1/2 in)
- Position: Central midfielder

Team information
- Current team: Dinamo City
- Number: 21

Youth career
- 2011–2013: EMV Rinia
- 2013–2014: Ali Demi
- 2014–2017: Dinamo Tirana
- 2017–2018: Ali Demi
- 2018–2022: Tirana

Senior career*
Years	Team	Apps	(Gls)
2021–2024	Tirana	26	(1)
2021–2024	→ Tirana U21	8	(3)
2024–	Dinamo City	64	(6)

International career^{‡}
2019	Albania U17	2	(0)
2021	Albania U19	6	(1)
2023–2024	Albania U21	5	(0)
2026–	Albania	1	(0)
- * Club domestic league appearances and goals as of 30 October 2026 ‡ National team caps and goals as of 29 September 2026

Klevi Qefalija (born 12 December 2003) is an Albanian professional footballer who plays as a central midfielder for Kategoria Superiore club Dinamo City and the Albania national team.

== Club career ==
Qefalija began his youth career with EMV Rinia, where he played from 2011 to 2013. He then joined Ali Demi for the 2013–14 season. In 2014, he moved to Dinamo Tirana, where he spent three years in the club's youth ranks before returning to Ali Demi for the 2017–18 season. Qefalija joined Tirana's academy in 2018 and later progressed to the club's first team. He was part of the first-team squad that won the 2021–22 Kategoria Superiore and made 26 league appearances, scoring once, during his spell with the club.

On 27 January 2024, Qefalija returned to Dinamo City, signing a contract with the club after leaving Tirana. During the remainder of the 2023–24 season, he made 15 league appearances and scored three goals for Dinamo.

In the 2024–25 season, Qefalija made 27 league appearances and scored once. On 1 May 2025, he started in the Albanian Cup final against Egnatia. Dinamo City won the competition after a 2–2 draw, defeating Egnatia 5–4 in the penalty shoot-out.

On 28 December 2025, Qefalija scored from the penalty spot in stoppage time as Dinamo City defeated Egnatia 3–1 in the 2025 Albanian Supercup, securing the trophy for his club.

During the 2025–26 season, he made 29 league appearances, scoring twice, as Dinamo City continued to compete for domestic honours. On 13 May 2026, Dinamo retained the Albanian Cup, defeating Egnatia 3–2 in the final to secure the trophy for the second consecutive season.

In the summer of 2026, Qefalija featured prominently in Dinamo City's 2026–27 UEFA Conference League qualifying campaign. He scored in the club's 3–0 victory over Slovenian side Aluminij on 30 July 2026, which secured a 4–1 aggregate win in the second qualifying round. He also scored in a 4–0 victory over Latvian club Auda on 13 August, helping Dinamo progress to the play-off round.

Dinamo subsequently faced Pafos in the play-off round but were eliminated after losing 4–2 in the second leg following extra time, having drawn the first leg 1–1. Qefalija finished the qualifying campaign with eight appearances and two goals in the competition.

== International career ==
Between 2019 and 2024, Qefalija represented Albania at youth international level, featuring for the U17, U19 and U21 teams, making 13 appearances and scoring one goal.

On 21 September 2026, Qefalija received his first call-up to the Albania senior national team for the 2026–27 UEFA Nations League, replacing the injured Adrion Pajaziti. His senior international debut came eight days later in the 2026–27 UEFA Nations League match against San Marino, coming on as a second-half substitute in Albania's 3–0 away victory.

== Career statistics ==
=== Club ===
As of match played 30 October 2026

Appearances and goals by club, season and competition
Club	Season	Division	League		Cup		Europe		Other		Total	
Club	Season	Division	Apps	Goals	Apps	Goals	Apps	Goals	Apps	Goals	Apps	Goals
Tirana	2020–21	Kategoria Superiore	1	0	—		—		—		1	0
Tirana	2021–22	Kategoria Superiore	6	0	—		—		—		6	0
Tirana	2022–23	Kategoria Superiore	12	0	5	0	4	0	—		21	0
Tirana	2023–24	Kategoria Superiore	7	1	—		1	0	—		8	1
Tirana	Total		26	1	5	0	5	0	—		36	1
Dinamo City	2023–24	Kategoria Superiore	15	3	—		—		—		15	3
Dinamo City	2024–25	Kategoria Superiore	27	1	5	0	—		1 (Note: Appearance in the Albanian Supercup.)	1	33	2
Dinamo City	2025–26	Kategoria Superiore	29	2	4	0	5	0	—		38	2
Dinamo City	2026–27	Kategoria Superiore	4	0	—		8	2	—		12	2
Dinamo City	Total		75	6	9	0	13	2	1	1	98	9
Career total			101	7	14	0	18	2	1	1	134	10

== Honours ==
Tirana

- Kategoria Superiore: 2021–22

Dinamo City

- Albanian Cup: 2024–25, 2025–26
- Albanian Supercup: 2025
