= Ardit Hila =

Albanian footballer

Personal information
- Date of birth: 6 January 1993 (age 33)
- Place of birth: Elbasan, Albania
- Height: 1.74 m (5 ft 9 in)
- Position: Midfielder

Team information
- Current team: Besëlidhja
- Number: 17

Youth career
- 2005–2011: Elbasani

Senior career*
Years	Team	Apps	(Gls)
2011–2015	Elbasani	82	(10)
2015–2018	Teuta Durrës	91	(13)
2018–2019	Partizani Tirana	27	(1)
2019–2020	Prishtina	21	(0)
2020–2021	Gjilani	30	(5)
2021–2022	Kukësi	19	(1)
2022–2024	Tirana	41	(8)
2024–2025	AF Elbasani	14	(1)
2025	→ Prishtina e Re (loan)	6	(0)
2025–	Besëlidhja	0	(0)
- * Club domestic league appearances and goals as of 1 June 2024

Ardit Hila (born 6 January 1993) is an Albanian professional footballer who plays as a midfielder for AF Elbasani.

== Club career ==
=== Elbasani ===
Hila made his professional debut on 16 May 2011 by playing full-90 minutes in a 1–2 home defeat to Shkumbini Peqin in the last championship game of 2010–11 season. Elbasani was eventually relegated after finishing in last position, collecting only 12 points.

=== Teuta Durrës ===
Following Elbasani's relegation from the Albanian Superliga, Hila signed a three-year contract with Teuta Durrës along with his teammate Emiljano Musta.

Hila scored his first goal for his new side on 4 October 2015 in a 3–0 league win over Bylis Ballsh. Later, he went on to score the only goal of both quarter-final legs of the Albanian Cup against Kukësi.

Hila enjoyed his most productive season in the 2017–18 under Gugash Magani and later Gentian Begeja, scoring 11 goals, including 9 in league, finishing it as team joint-top scorer along with Latif Amadu. In addition to that, he also had the worst disciplinary record among his teammates, receiving 13 yellow cards during the season.

He left the club on 26 May 2018 with the aim a pursuing a career outside of Albania.

=== Partizani Tirana ===
On 26 June 2018, fellow Superliga side Partizani Tirana announced to have acquired Hila on a 1+1 contract.

=== FC Prishtina ===
He signed with FC Prishtina for 2 years.

== Career statistics ==
As of 23 May 2018

Club	Season	League			Cup		Europe		Total	
Club	Season	Division	Apps	Goals	Apps	Goals	Apps	Goals	Apps	Goals
Elbasani	2010–11	Albanian Superliga	1	0	0	0	—		1	0
Elbasani	2011–12	Albanian First Division	25	4	2	0	—		27	4
Elbasani	2012–13	Albanian First Division	10	1	2	0	—		12	1
Elbasani	2013–14	Albanian First Division	16	5	1	0	—		17	5
Elbasani	2014–15	Albanian Superliga	30	0	1	0	—		31	0
Elbasani	Total		82	10	4	0	—		86	10
Teuta Durrës	2015–16	Albanian Superliga	30	3	3	1	—		33	4
Teuta Durrës	2016–17	Albanian Superliga	28	1	6	2	2 (Note: All appearance(s) in UEFA Europa League)	0	36	3
Teuta Durrës	2017–18	Albanian Superliga	33	9	4	2	—		37	11
Teuta Durrës	Total		91	13	13	5	2	0	106	18
Partizani Tirana	2018–19	Albanian Superliga	0	0	0	0	0	0	0	0
Career total			173	23	19	5	2	0	194	28

== Honours ==
Elbasani

- Albanian First Division: 2013–14

Partizani

- Kategoria Superiore: 2018–19

Prishtina

- Kosovar Cup: 2019–20

Tirana

- Kategoria Superiore: 2021–22
  - Runner-up:2022–23
- Kupa e Shqipërisë
  - Runner-up:2022–23
- Albanian Supercup: 2022
