= Kategoria Superiore U-21 =

- Organising body: Albanian Football Association
- Founded: November 2020; 4 years ago
- Country: Albania
- Confederation: UEFA
- Number of clubs: 13
- Level on pyramid: 1
- Relegation to: None
- Current champions: KF Apolonia (1st)
- Website: Superiore U-21
- Current: 2024–25

Kategoria Superiore U-21, also called U-21 Superiore, is a reserve league competition for football clubs in Albania. The league was formed in November 2020 and the first season comprised 13 teams which is due to end on 19 May 2021.

== List of champions ==
Season	Champion	Runner-up	Third place	Top scorer(s)	Goals
2020–21	Bylis	Laçi	Teuta	Eridon Qardaku	19
2021–22	Bylis	Vllaznia	Dinamo	Eridon Qardaku	20
2022–23	Vllaznia	Partizani	Bylis		
2023–24	Bylis	Partizani	Vora		
2024–25	Apolonia	Bylis	Vllaznia		

== Teams ==
Team	Town/city	Ground
Akademia e Futbollit	Tirana	National Sports Centre
Apolonia	Fier	Loni Papuçiu Stadium Annex
Bylis	Ballsh	Adush Muça Stadium
Dinamo Tirana	Tirana	Internacional Complex
Football Republic	Tirana	Football Republic Complex
Kastrioti	Krujë	National Sports Centre
Kukësi	Kukës	Football Republic Complex
Laçi	Laç	National Sports Centre
Shënkolli	Shënkoll	National Sports Centre
Teuta	Durrës	Niko Dovana Stadium Annex
Tirana	Tirana	Skënder Halili Complex
Turbina	Cërrik	Football Republic Complex
Vllaznia	Shkodër	Reshit Rusi Stadium
