= Kristijan Toshevski =

Macedonian footballer (born 1994)

Personal information
- Full name: Kristijan Toshevski; Кристијан Тошевски
- Date of birth: 6 May 1994 (age 32)
- Place of birth: Tetovo, Republic of Macedonia
- Height: 1.82 m (5 ft 11 1/2 in)
- Position: Right back

Team information
- Current team: Ferizaj

Youth career
- –2012: Teteks

Senior career*
Years	Team	Apps	(Gls)
2012–2016	Teteks	39	(1)
2016–2017	Pelister	51	(0)
2018–2020	Vardar	55	(1)
2020–2023	Tirana	84	(0)
2023–2025	Shkupi	34	(0)
2025–2026	Pogradeci	0	(0)
2026–	Ferizaj	0	(0)

International career^{‡}
2014–2016	Macedonia U21	3	(0)
2017–	North Macedonia	9	(0)
- * Club domestic league appearances and goals as of 8 August 2025 ‡ National team caps and goals as of 19 November 2019

Kristijan Toshevski (Macedonian: Кристијан Тошевски; born 6 May 1994) is a Macedonian professional footballer who plays for as a right-back for Ferizaj and the North Macedonia national team.

== Playing career ==
=== International career ===
Toshevski has been part of the Macedonia national under-21 football team since 2013 and has been capped 3 times. On 28 March 2017, he also made his debut for the senior national team in a friendly match against Belarus, which ended in a 3–0 victory for Macedonia. As of May 2020, has earned a total of 8 caps, scoring no goals.

== Honours ==
=== Club ===
Teteks

- Macedonian Football Cup
  - Winner: 2012–13
  - Runner-up: 2014–15
- Macedonian Super Cup
  - Runner-up: 2013

Pelister

- Macedonian Football Cup
  - Winner: 2016–17

Tirana

- Abissnet Superiore
  - Winner:2021–22
- Albanian Supercup
  - Winner:2022
  - Runner-up: 2020
