= 2023 Albanian Cup final =

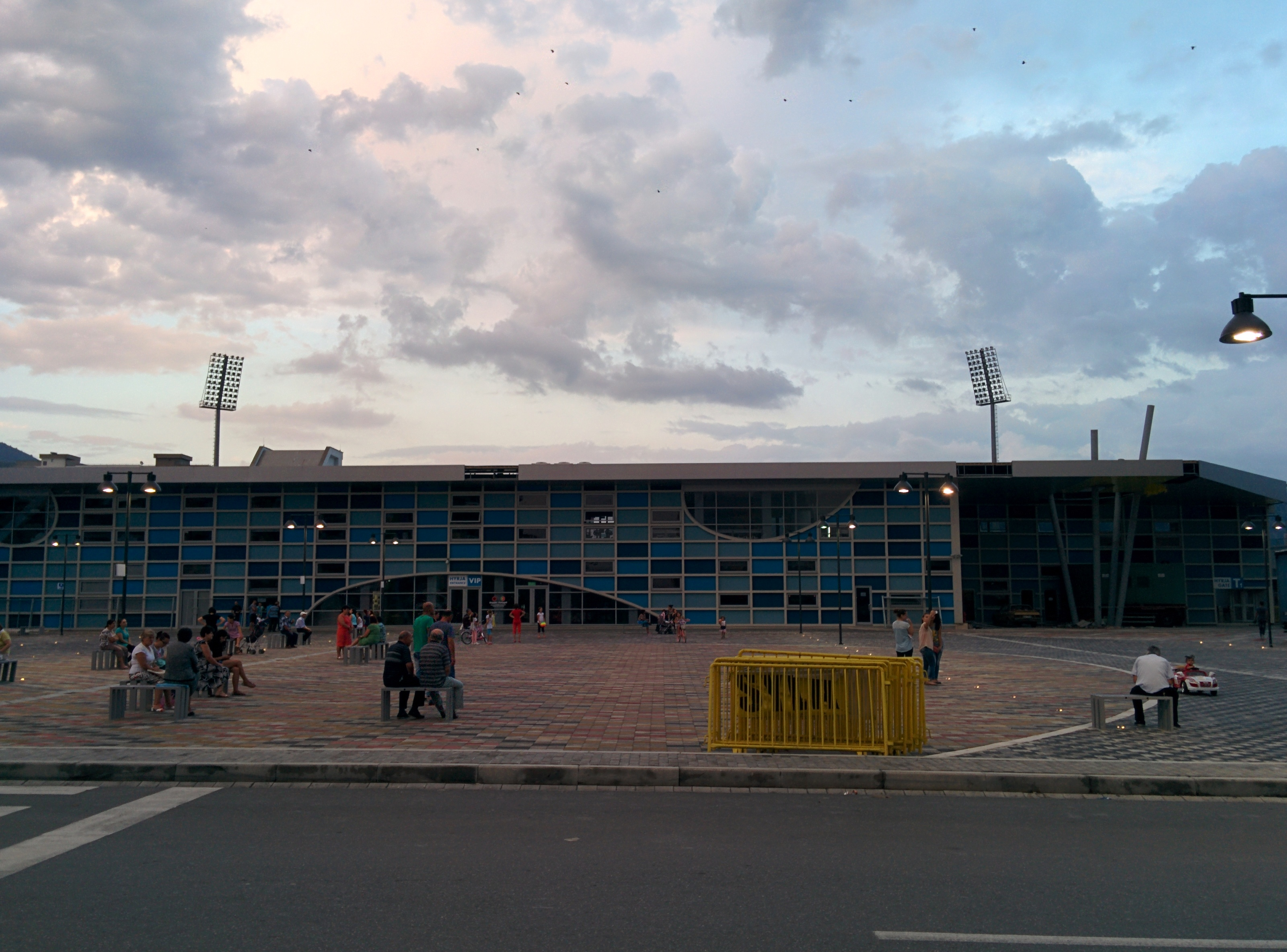
- The match was played at the Elbasan Arena in Elbasan
- Event: 2022–23 Albanian Cup
Tirana	Egnatia
0	1
- After extra time
- Date: 1 June 2023
- Venue: Elbasan Arena, Elbasan
- Referee: Enea Jorgji

The 2023 Albanian Cup final was a football match that was played on 1 June 2023 to decide the winner of the 2022–23 Albanian Cup, the 71st edition of the Albanian Cup. The match was played between Tirana and Egnatia at the Elbasan Arena in Elbasan. Egnatia won the match 0−1 after extra time to earn their first Albanian Cup title.

== Match ==
=== Details ===
1 June 2023
19:00

Tirana	0−1 (a.e.t.)	Egnatia
	Report	Jackson 114'

Elbasan Arena, Elbasan
Referee: Enea Jorgji
