= Ermal Meta (footballer) =

Albanian footballer

Personal information
- Full name: Ermal Meta
- Date of birth: 20 June 2005 (age 21)
- Place of birth: Elbasan, Albania
- Position: Defensive midfielder

Team information
- Current team: Tirana
- Number: 33

Youth career
- 2016–2022: Elbasani
- 2022–2023: Tirana

Senior career*
Years	Team	Apps	(Gls)
2023–	Tirana	59	(0)

International career^{‡}
2022	Albania U18	2	(0)
2023–2025	Albania U19	9	(0)
- * Club domestic league appearances and goals as of 1 February 2024 ‡ National team caps and goals as of 1 February 2024

Ermal Meta (born 20 June 2005) is an Albanian professional footballer who plays as a defensive midfielder for Kategoria Superiore club Tirana.

== Career statistics ==
=== Club ===
As of 1 February 2024

Club statistics
Club	Season	League			Cup		Europe (Note: Including continental competitions, such as UEFA Champions League and UEFA Europa League)		Other		Total	
Club	Season	Division	Apps	Goals	Apps	Goals	Apps	Goals	Apps	Goals	Apps	Goals
Tirana	2022–23	Kategoria Superiore	0	0	4	0	—		0	0	4	0
Tirana	2023–24	Kategoria Superiore	11	0	1	0	0	0	0	0	12	0
Career total			11	0	5	0	0	0	0	0	16	0

== Honours ==
=== Club ===
Tirana

  - Runner-up: Kategoria Superiore: 2022–23
  - Runner-up: Kupa e Shqipërisë: 2022–23
