= Angelo Tafa =

Footballer (born 2000)

Personal information
- Full name: Angelo Tafa
- Date of birth: 5 July 2000 (age 26)
- Place of birth: Athens, Greece
- Height: 1.84 m (6 ft 0 in)
- Position: Goalkeeper

Team information
- Current team: Boluspor
- Number: 1

Youth career
- –2019: AEK Athens

Senior career*
Years	Team	Apps	(Gls)
2017–2019	AEK Athens	0	(0)
2017	→ Loutraki (loan)		
2018	→ Keratsini (loan)		
2019–2020	Ionikos	2	(0)
2020–2024	Kukësi	103	(0)
2023	→ Gjilani (loan)	2	(0)
2024–2025	Teuta Durrës	33	(0)
2025–2026	Tirana	23	(0)
2026-	Boluspor	6	(0)

International career
2017	Albania U19	1	(0)
2017–	Albania U21	5	(0)
- * Club domestic league appearances and goals as of 15 September 2026

Angelo Tafa (born 5 July 2000) is a professional footballer who plays as a goalkeeper.
