= Elvi Berisha =

Albanian professional footballer

Personal information
- Date of birth: 2 March 1999 (age 27)
- Place of birth: Fier, Albania
- Height: 1.87 m (6 ft 2 in)
- Position: Left midfielder

Team information
- Current team: Kastrioti

Youth career
- 2012–2014: Apolonia Fier
- 2014–2017: Tirana

Senior career*
Years	Team	Apps	(Gls)
2016–2017	Tirana	0	(0)
2017–2018	Leganés B	4	(3)
2018–2020	Laçi	24	(0)
2020–2022	Skënderbeu Korçë	67	(7)
2022–2023	Tirana	15	(0)
2023–2024	Flamurtari Vlorë	8	(0)
2024	Bylis	7	(0)
2024–	Kastrioti	24	(2)

International career
2014–2015	Albania U17	3	(1)
2016–2017	Albania U19	4	(0)
- * Club domestic league appearances and goals as of 29 September 2025

Elvi Berisha (born 2 March 1999) is an Albanian professional footballer who plays as a wide midfielder for Kastrioti.

== Club career ==
=== Early career ===
Berisha started his youth career aged 12 with FK Fieri under-13. After spending one season there, he moved at fellow Fieri club KF Apolonia Fier under-15. During the 2014 Summer window transfers, Berisha signed with KF Tirana.

On 20 June 2016 Berisha had a trial by Roma in a Serie D club.

=== Leganés ===
On 12 August 2017, Berisha started a trial at Spanish side CD Leganés. In his first trial game with the reserves he scored twice against Guadalajara in a 4–2 win, where he wore the shirt number 7. Following that, the club was convinced to sign him three days later. Berisha agreed a four-year contract joining on a free transfer since he had no professional contract with Tirana. Tirana were, however, entitled to €90,000 due to FIFA's rules that the club where a player was raised earns €30,000 for each year the player was part of the club.

Berisha was subsequently assigned to the B-team in the regional leagues. On 12 November 2017, he scored a hat-trick for the side in a 5–2 home routing of CDV Rayo Serranillos.

== International career ==
=== Albania U17 ===
Berisha was called up by Albania national under-17 football team coach Džemal Mustedanagić to participate in the 2015 UEFA European Under-17 Championship qualification where Albania U17 was placed in Group 9. He made his debut on 8 October 2014 in the opening match against Norway coming on as a second-half substitute in the 47th minute in place of Gezim Pepsi in an eventual 3–0 defeat. He played also as a second-half substitute in the closing match against San Marino U17 on 13 October replacing Rubin Hebaj in the 60th minute and managed to score a goal in the 74th minute to sign the 5–1 victory.

Berisha was re-called at Albania under-17 by coach Džemal Mustedanagić to participate in the 2016 UEFA European Under-17 Championship qualification from 22 to 27 October 2015. He played 1 match as a starter against Netherlands U17 on 24 October and was substituted off in the half-time for Arlind Demaj.

=== Albania U19 ===
He was called up at Albania national under-19 football team by coach Arjan Bellaj to participate in the 2017 UEFA European Under-19 Championship qualification from 6–11 October 2016. He was an unused substitute in the opening match against Republic of Ireland U19 and played two full 90-minutes matches against Germany U19 in 3–2 loss and against Gibraltar U19 in a 1–0 victory.

Berisha was re-called at Albania under-19 by new coach Erjon Bogdani for a gathering in Durrës, Albania in April 2017 where they also played two friendly matches.

== Career statistics ==
=== Club ===
As of 14 August 2017

Appearances and goals by club, season and competition
Club	Season	League			Cup		Europe (Note: Including continental competitions, such as UEFA Champions League and UEFA Europa League)		Other		Total	
Club	Season	Division	Apps	Goals	Apps	Goals	Apps	Goals	Apps	Goals	Apps	Goals
Tirana	2015–16	Albanian Superliga	0	0	—		—		—		0	0
Tirana	2017–18	Albanian First Division	—		—		2 (Note: Appearances in the UEFA Europa League)	0	—		2	0
Tirana	Total		0	0	—		2	0	—		2	0
Leganés B	2017–18	Segunda Regional	4	3	—		—		—		4	3
Career total			4	3	—		2	0	—		6	3

== Honours ==
=== Club ===
Tirana

- Albanian Supercup: 2022
- Albanian Cup
  - Runner-up: 2023
