= Adolf Selmani =

Albanian footballer (born 2000)

Personal information
- Full name: Adolf Selmani
- Date of birth: 26 June 2000 (age 26)
- Place of birth: Krujë, Albania
- Position: Centre-back

Team information
- Current team: Kastrioti
- Number: 3

Youth career
- 2013–2016: Partizani
- 2016–2017: Iliria
- 2017–2018: Laçi
- 2018–2019: Iliria

Senior career*
Years	Team	Apps	(Gls)
2019–2020	Kastrioti	17	(0)
2020–2021	Laçi	31	(1)
2021–2022	Teuta	10	(0)
2022–	Kastrioti	45	(1)

International career
2020–	Albania U21	9	(2)
- * Club domestic league appearances and goals as of 28 April 2023

Adolf Selmani (born 26 June 2000) is an Albanian professional footballer who plays as a centre-back for Albanian club Kastrioti.

He is the younger brother of Gentian Selmani of Turkish club Boluspor and the Albania national team, as well as the older brother of Santiago Selmani who also plays for Kastrioti.
