= Rimal Haxhiu =

Albanian footballer

Personal information
- Date of birth: 4 March 1999 (age 27)
- Place of birth: Krujë, Albania
- Height: 1.81 m (5 ft 11 in)
- Position: Winger

Team information
- Current team: Malisheva
- Number: 14

Youth career
- 2011–2015: Iliria
- 2015–2018: Partizani Tirana

Senior career*
Years	Team	Apps	(Gls)
2018–2019	Blumenthaler SV	10	(7)
2019	Bremer SV	12	(3)
2019–2020	Iliria	10	(3)
2020	Luftëtari	12	(2)
2020–2023	Apolonia	28	(1)
2021–2022	→ Dinamo Tirana (loan)	23	(1)
2022–2023	→ Kukësi (loan)	17	(0)
2023–2026	Tirana	108	(7)
2026–	Malisheva	2	(0)

International career^{‡}
2017–2018	Albania U19	3	(0)
- * Club domestic league appearances and goals as of 11 October 2026 ‡ National team caps and goals as of 1 August 2020

Rimal Haxhiu (born 4 March 1999) is an Albanian professional footballer who plays as a winger.

== Career ==
=== Germany ===
Following a youth career with Partizani Tirana in his native Albania, Haxhiu joined German club Blumenthaler SV in 2018. In January 2019, Haxhiu moved to Bremer SV.

=== Luftëtari ===
In January 2020, Haxhiu joined Albanian Superliga club KF Luftëtari. He made his league debut for the club on 2 February 2020 in a 3–0 home defeat to former club Partizani Tirana.

== Honours ==
Tirana

- Albanian Superliga runner-up: 2022–23
- Albanian Cup runner-up: 2022–23
