= Vesel Limaj =

Albanian footballer

Personal information
- Date of birth: 1 December 1996 (age 29)
- Place of birth: Freising, Germany
- Height: 1.83 m (6 ft 0 in)
- Position: Attacking midfielder

Team information
- Current team: Drita
- Number: 8

Youth career
- 2003–2004: SSV Ulm 1846
- 2004–2007: 1. FC Neukölln
- 2007–2008: SV Lichtenberg 47
- 2008–2010: Berliner FC Dynamo
- 2010–2013: Tennis Borussia Berlin
- 2013–2015: Energie Cottbus

Senior career*
| Years | Team | Apps | (Gls) |
| 2015–2017 | Hamburger SV II | 9 | (0) |
| 2017 | SV Horn | 1 | (0) |
| 2017–2018 | Bylis | 11 | (1) |
| 2018–2021 | Kukësi | 93 | (13) |
| 2021–2023 | Tirana | 49 | (6) |
| 2023 | Hermannstadt | 15 | (1) |
| 2023–2024 | Ballkani | 29 | (1) |
| 2024–2025 | Malisheva | 31 | (2) |
| 2025– | Drita | 32 | (2) |
- * Club domestic league appearances and goals as of 22 June 2026

Vesel Limaj (born 1 December 1996) is a German professional footballer who plays as an attacking midfielder for Drita.

== Early career ==
Born in Freising, Germany to Kosovo Albanian parents from Malisheva, Limaj started his youth career at SSV Ulm 1846 at the age of 6, before going on to play for 1. FC Neukölln, SV Lichtenberg 47, Berliner FC Dynamo, Tennis Borussia Berlin and Energie Cottbus at youth level. He joined Hamburger SV II in the summer of 2015 where he would remain until January 2017, which is when he signed for Austrian Football First League club SV Horn. He signed a one-and-a-half-year contract with SV Horn but made just one substitute appearance in the league before leaving the club at the end of the 2016–17 season

In July 2023, Limaj signed a contract with Ballkani.

== Honours ==
Kukësi

- Albanian Cup: 2018–19
- Albanian Supercup runner-up: 2019

Tirana

- Kategoria Superiore: 2021–22
- Albanian Supercup: 2022

Drita

- Kosovar Supercup: 2025
