= Ardit Deliu =

Albanian footballer (born 1997)

Personal information
- Date of birth: 26 October 1997 (age 29)
- Place of birth: Durrës, Albania
- Height: 1.73 m (5 ft 8 in)
- Position: Defensive midfielder

Team information
- Current team: Ballkani
- Number: 21

Youth career
- 2011–2015: Besa
- 2016: RNK Split

Senior career*
Years	Team	Apps	(Gls)
2014–2015	Besa Kavajë	4	(2)
2016	RNK Split	1	(0)
2017–2018	Hajduk Split II	6	(1)
2018–2022	Laçi	106	(4)
2022	Liepāja	8	(0)
2022–2024	Tirana	61	(3)
2024–2025	Vllaznia Shkodër	23	(1)
2025–	Ballkani	29	(0)

International career
2013–2014	Albania U17	5	(0)
2015	Albania U19	2	(0)
2017–2019	Albania U21	4	(0)
2022	Albania	1	(0)
- * Club domestic league appearances and goals as of 22 June 2026

Ardit Deliu (born 26 October 1997) is an Albanian professional footballer who plays as a defensive midfielder for Ballkani.

== Club career ==
=== Early career ===
Deliu started his youth career in 2011 at hometown club Besa as a 14 years old. During the 2012–13 season he played for the under-17 side managed by Ylli Teliti forming a strong duo striker partnership with Regi Lushkja, where in the first half of the season the duo scored 90% off all Besa Under-17 goals.

=== Besa ===
He gained entry with the first team in 2014 as he was included by the coach Artan Mërgjyshi to participate in an Albanian Cup match against Veleçiku on 22 October 2014 where he also made his debut by coming on as a substitute in the 46th minute in place of Darlien Bajaziti. One month later Deliu made his league debut against Burreli on 22 November 2014 and also scored his first goal for Besa.

He concluded the season with 4 league appearances in total scoring 2 goals and a single Domestic cup appearance.

=== RNK Split ===
On 27 August 2015 Deliu signed with Croatian side RNK Split following the recommendation of Sokol Cikalleshi, the fellow Albanian player of RNK Split during the 2014–15 season. Being underage, he wasn't registered until February 2016.

=== Hajduk Split ===
On 7 February 2017 Deliu signed with HNK Hajduk Split II until June 2018.

== International career ==
=== Albania U17 ===
Deliu was part of the Albania national under-17 football team of coach Džemal Mustedanagić in the 2014 UEFA European Under-17 Championship, appearing in 5 out 6 matches between qualifying round and elite round, completing 3 full 80-minute matches in the qualifying round and two appearances as a substitute in the elite round.

=== Albania U19 ===
Deliu advanced at Albania national under-19 football team as he was invited by coach Arjan Bellaj to participate in the 2016 UEFA European Under-19 Championship qualification from 12 to 17 November 2015. He played two full 90-minutes matches against Austria U19 in a 1–2 loss and Georgia U19 in the 0–1 loss, where he received a yellow card yellow card for each match and missed the closing match.

=== Albania U21 ===
Deliu received a call up at Albania national under-21 football team by coach Alban Bushi for a gathering in Durrës, Albania from 18 to 25 January 2017. He was invited again in the next gathering two months later for a double Friendly match against Moldova U21 on 25 & 27 March 2017.

== Career statistics ==
=== Club ===
As of 9 June 2022

Club statistics
Club	Season	League			Cup		Europe (Note: Including continental competitions, such as UEFA Champions League and UEFA Europa League)		Other		Total	
Club	Season	Division	Apps	Goals	Apps	Goals	Apps	Goals	Apps	Goals	Apps	Goals
Besa	2014–15	Kategoria e Parë	4	2	1	0	—		—		5	2
RNK Split	2015–16	Croatian First League	0	0	—		—		—		0	0
RNK Split	2016–17	Croatian First League	1	0	—		—		—		1	0
RNK Split	Total		1	0	—		—		—		1	0
Hajduk Split II	2016–17	Croatian Third League			—		—		—			
Hajduk Split II	2017–18	Croatian Second League	6	1	—		—		—		6	1
Hajduk Split II	Total		6	1	—		—		—		6	1
Laçi	2018–19	Kategoria Superiore	8	0	2	0	—		0	0	10	0
Laçi	2019–20	Kategoria Superiore	35	1	2	0	2	0	—		39	1
Laçi	2020–21	Kategoria Superiore	33	1	4	0	2	0	—		39	1
Laçi	2021–22	Kategoria Superiore	30	2	7	1	4	1	—		41	4
Laçi	Total		106	4	15	1	8	1	0	0	129	6
Career total			117	7	16	1	8	1	0	0	141	9

== Honours ==
=== Club ===
Tirana

- Kategoria Superiore: 2021–22
  - Runner-up:2022–23
- Kupa e Shqipërisë
  - Runner-up:2022–23
- Albanian Supercup: 2022
