= Edison Ndreca =

Albanian footballer

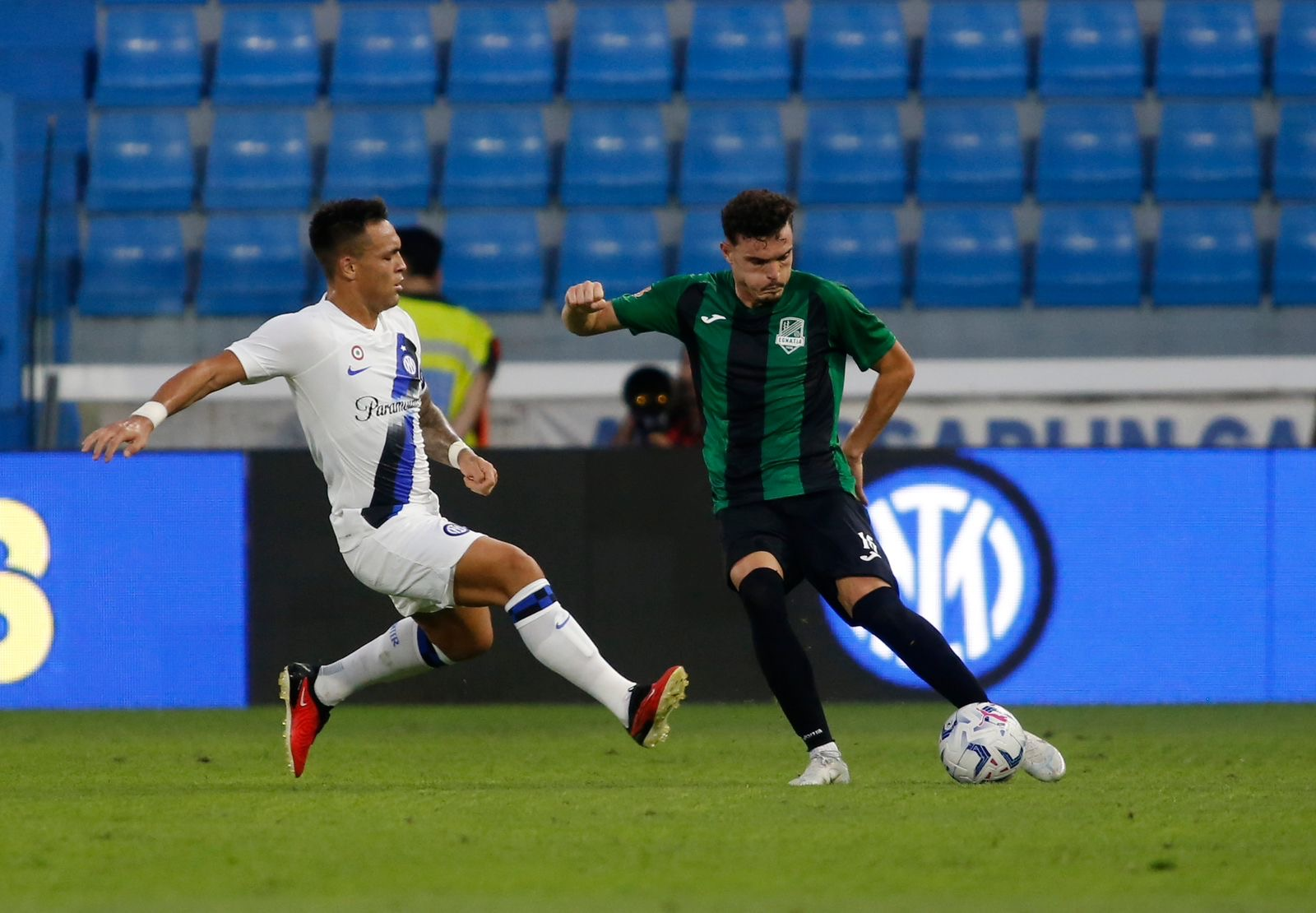

Personal information
- Date of birth: 5 July 1994 (age 32)
- Place of birth: Rrëshen, Albania
- Height: 1.86 m (6 ft 1 in)
- Position: Left-back

Youth career
- 2011–2013: Laçi

Senior career*
Years	Team	Apps	(Gls)
2013–2015	Laçi	22	(1)
2016	Burreli	13	(0)
2016–2018	Besëlidhja	48	(7)
2018–2019	Teuta	4	(0)
2019	Kastrioti	15	(1)
2019–2021	Bylis	57	(9)
2021–2023	Kukësi	66	(5)
2022	→ Partizani (loan)	0	(0)
2023–2026	Egnatia	68	(10)
2026	Yelimay	3	(0)
- * Club domestic league appearances and goals as of 1 July 2026

Edison Ndreca (born 5 July 1994) is an Albanian professional footballer who plays as a left-back.

== Club career ==
Ndreca was a member of the KF Laçi under-19 side for 2 years between 2011 and 2013, where he featured in 52 games and scored 13 goals, which earned him a promotion to the senior team ahead of the 2013–14 season.

On 2 June 2018, Ndreca agreed personal terms and joined Teuta until June 2020. After only six months and limited with playing time, Ndreca joined KS Kastrioti in January 2019.

== Career statistics ==
As of 5 May 2018

Appearances and goals by club, season and competition
Club	Season	League			Cup		Europe		Other		Total	
Club	Season	Division	Apps	Goals	Apps	Goals	Apps	Goals	Apps	Goals	Apps	Goals
Laçi	2013–14	Kategoria Superiore	13	1	3	1	—		—		16	2
Laçi	2014–15	Kategoria Superiore	7	0	3	0	3 (Note: All appearance(s) in UEFA Europa League)	0	—		13	0
Laçi	2015–16	Kategoria Superiore	2	0	3	0	0	0	1 (Note: Appearance in Albanian Supercup)	0	6	0
Laçi	Total		22	1	9	1	3	0	1	0	35	2
Burreli	2015–16	Kategoria e Parë	13	0	0	0	—		—		13	0
Besëlidhja	2016–17	Kategoria e Parë	24	2	8	0	—		—		32	2
Besëlidhja	2017–18	Kategoria e Parë	24	5	4	0	—		—		28	4
Besëlidhja	Total		48	7	12	0	—		—		60	7
Teuta	2018–19	Kategoria Superiore	0	0	0	0	—		—		0	0
Career total			83	8	21	1	3	0	1	0	108	9

== Honours ==
Laçi

- Albanian Cup: 2014–15

Egnatia

- Albanian Cup: 2023–24
