= Enes Kuka =

Albanian footballer

Personal information
- Date of birth: 14 January 2002 (age 24)
- Height: 1.80 m (5 ft 11 in)
- Position: Midfielder

Team information
- Current team: Kastrioti
- Number: 21

Youth career
- 2013–2018: Internacional Tirana
- 2018–2020: Tirana

Senior career*
Years	Team	Apps	(Gls)
2020–2023	Tirana	23	(0)
2022–2023	→ Besa Kavajë (loan)	24	(1)
2023–	Kastrioti	54	(3)

International career^{‡}
2019	Albania U18	1	(0)
- * Club domestic league appearances and goals as of 4 May 2024 ‡ National team caps and goals as of 25 April 2019

Enes Kuka (born 14 January 2002) is an Albanian professional footballer who plays as a midfielder for Kastrioti.

== Career statistics ==
=== Club ===
As of 14 September 2021.

Club	Season	League			Cup		Continental		Other		Total	
Club	Season	Division	Apps	Goals	Apps	Goals	Apps	Goals	Apps	Goals	Apps	Goals
Tirana	2020–21	Kategoria Superiore	7	0	0	0	–		0	0	7	0
Tirana	2021–22	Kategoria Superiore	1	0	0	0	–		0	0	1	0
Career total			8	0	0	0	0	0	0	0	8	0

== Honours ==
Tirana

- Kategoria Superiore: 2021–22
