= Edmir Sali =

Albanian footballer

Personal information
- Date of birth: 7 August 1997 (age 29)
- Place of birth: Vlorë, Albania
- Height: 1.91 m (6 ft 3 in)
- Position: Goalkeeper

Team information
- Current team: Dinamo City
- Number: 1

Youth career
- 2012–2016: Flamurtari
- 2013: → Vlora (loan)

Senior career*
Years	Team	Apps	(Gls)
2014–2018	Flamurtari	5	(0)
2016	Flamurtari B	2	(0)
2017	→ Oriku (loan)	13	(0)
2019–2021	Laçi	3	(0)
2021–2023	Kastrioti Krujë	63	(0)
2023–	Dinamo City	43	(0)
- * Club domestic league appearances and goals as of 18 August 2025

Edmir Sali (born 7 August 1997) is an Albanian professional footballer who plays as a goalkeeper for Albanian club Dinamo City.
