= Lukman Hussein =

Nigerian association football player

Personal information
- Full name: Lukman Olayemi Hussein
- Date of birth: 28 August 1996 (age 30)
- Place of birth: Lagos, Nigeria
- Height: 1.83 m (6 ft 0 in)
- Position: Defender

Team information
- Current team: Drenica
- Number: 2

Youth career
- –2014: 36 Lion

Senior career*
Years	Team	Apps	(Gls)
2016	36 Lion	12	(0)
2016–2017	Burreli	24	(2)
2017–2022	Kastrioti	100	(0)
2022	Tirana	5	(0)
2023–	Drenica	12	(0)
- * Club domestic league appearances and goals as of 28 May 2023

Lukman Olayemi Hussein (born 28 August 1996) is a Nigerian footballer who plays as a defender for Kosovan club Drenica.

== Career statistics ==
=== Club ===
As of 8 December 2018.

Club	Season	League			Cup		Continental		Other		Total	
Club	Season	Division	Apps	Goals	Apps	Goals	Apps	Goals	Apps	Goals	Apps	Goals
Burreli	2016–17	Albanian First Division	24	2	1 (Note: Appearances in the Albanian Cup)	0	–		0	0	25	2
Kastrioti	2017–18	Albanian First Division	14	0	0	0	–		0	0	14	0
Kastrioti	2018–19	Albanian First Division	14	0	0	0	–		0	0	14	0
Career total			52	2	1	0	0	0	0	0	53	2

== Honours ==
=== Club ===
Tirana

- Albanian Supercup: 2022
