= Filip Najdovski =

Macedonian footballer

Personal information
- Full name: Filip Najdovski
- Date of birth: 13 September 1992 (age 34)
- Place of birth: Skopje, Macedonia
- Height: 1.85 m (6 ft 1 in)
- Positions: Defender; midfielder

Team information
- Current team: Vardar
- Number: 5

Youth career
- 2002–2009: Cementarnica 55

Senior career*
| Years | Team | Apps | (Gls) |
| 2009–2010 | Cementarnica 55 | 10 | (0) |
| 2010–2014 | Napredok | 65 | (5) |
| 2014–2015 | Teteks | 28 | (3) |
| 2016–2018 | Pobeda | 58 | (7) |
| 2018–2020 | Vardar | 49 | (3) |
| 2020–2024 | Tirana | 114 | (5) |
| 2024– | Vardar | 24 | (0) |

International career^{‡}
| 2010–2011 | Macedonia U19 | 9 | (0) |
| 2012–2013 | Macedonia U21 | 15 | (0) |
- * Club domestic league appearances and goals as of 23 May 2026 ‡ National team caps and goals as of 6 November 2020

Filip Najdovski (Macedonian: Филип Hajдoвcки; born 13 September 1992) is a Macedonian professional footballer who plays for Macedonian First League club Vardar as both a defender and midfielder.

== Tirana ==
Najdovski joined Albanian club and Kategoria Superiore champions KF Tirana on 12 August 2020 on a free transfer, immediately joining the rest of the squad at their pre-season training camp in Pogradec

== Honours ==
Vardar

- Macedonian First Football League: 2019–20

Tirana

- Kategoria Superiore: 2021–22
- Albanian Supercup:2022
- Albanian Cup Runner-up: 2023
