= National Sports Centre (Albania) =

Stadium in Kamëz, Tiranë, Albania

- Qendra Kombetare Sportive
- Location: Kamëz, Tiranë, Albania
- Operator: Albanian Football Association
- Capacity: 50

Construction
- Opened: March 25, 2004; 22 years ago

Tenants
- Albania national team (training); Albania women's national team Albania U21 (training); Albania U19 (training); Albania U17 (training); Albania U15 (training); KF Tirana B

National Sports Centre (Albanian: Qendra Kombetare Sportive) is a purpose-built stadium in Kamëz, Tiranë, Albania.
