= Mehdi Çoba =

Albanian footballer

Personal information
- Date of birth: 9 March 2000 (age 26)
- Place of birth: Shkodër, Albania
- Height: 1.82 m (6 ft 0 in)
- Position: Forward

Team information
- Current team: Drenica
- Number: 96

Youth career
- AAS Academy
- 2020: FK Sabah-2

Senior career*
Years	Team	Apps	(Gls)
2020–2025	Vllaznia Shkodër	111	(9)
2025	Gjilani	6	(0)
2026–	Drenica	2	(0)

International career^{‡}
2021–	Albania U21	1	(0)
- * Club domestic league appearances and goals as of 22 June 2026 ‡ National team caps and goals as of 30 October 2021

Mehdi Çoba (born 9 March 2000) is an Albanian footballer who plays as a forward for Drenica in the Football Superleague of Kosovo.

== Career ==
=== Early career ===
In September 2019, Çoba traveled to Azerbaijan to train with Sabah FC. He signed an 18-month contract with the club in January 2020, joining the club's youth team.

=== Vllaznia ===
In August 2020, Çoba returned to his native Albania, signing with Kategoria Superiore club Vllaznia. He made his league debut for the club on 29 November 2020, coming on as a 74th-minute substitute for Ismael Dunga in a 4–2 home defeat to Kukësi. in February 2022, he signed a three-year contract extension with the club.

== Career statistics ==
=== Club ===
As of match played 24 October 2021

Appearances and goals by club, season and competition
Club	Season	League			Cup (Note: Includes appearances in the Albanian Football Cup and Albanian Supercup)		Continental (Note: Includes appearances in the UEFA Europa Conference League)		Other		Total	
Club	Season	Division	Apps	Goals	Apps	Goals	Apps	Goals	Apps	Goals	Apps	Goals
Vllaznia	2020–21	Kategoria Superiore	4	0	1	1	—	—	—	—	5	1
Vllaznia	2021–22	Kategoria Superiore	5	0	3	1	4	1	—	—	12	2
Career total			9	0	4	2	4	1	0	0	17	3
