= Aleksandër Trumçi =

Albanian association football player

Personal information
- Full name: Aleksandër Trumçi
- Date of birth: 31 December 2000 (age 25)
- Place of birth: Shkodër, Albania
- Position: Right-back

Team information
- Current team: Shkëndija
- Number: 2

Youth career
- 2014–2019: Shkodra

Senior career*
Years	Team	Apps	(Gls)
2020	Veleçiku	9	(2)
2020–2024	Bylis	101	(4)
2024	→ Shkëndija (loan)	17	(1)
2025–	Shkëndija	40	(0)
- * Club domestic league appearances and goals as of 18 June 2026 ‡ National team caps and goals as of 20 December 2022

Aleksandër Trumçi (born 31 December 2000) is an Albanian professional footballer who plays as a right-back for Shkëndija.

== Career ==
In June 2024, Trumçi joined Macedonian First League club Shkëndija on an initial six-month loan deal with the obligation to buy.

== Honours ==
Shkëndija

- Macedonian First Football League: 2024–25

== Career statistics ==
=== Club ===
As of 20 December 2022

Club	Season	League			Cup		Continental		Other		Total	
Club	Season	Division	Apps	Goals	Apps	Goals	Apps	Goals	Apps	Goals	Apps	Goals
Veleçiku	Kategoria e Parë	2019–20	9	2	1	0	–		0	0	10	2
Veleçiku	Total		9	2	1	0	0	0	0	0	10	2
Bylis	Kategoria Superiore	2020–21	10	0	2	1	–		0	0	12	1
Bylis	Kategoria e Parë	2021–22	28	0	4	0	–		0	0	32	0
Bylis	Kategoria Superiore	2022–23	13	1	0	0	–		0	0	13	1
Bylis	Total		51	1	6	1	0	0	0	0	57	2
Career total			60	3	7	1	0	0	0	0	67	4
