= Alfred Mensah =

Ghanaian footballer

Personal information
- Date of birth: 8 August 1999 (age 27)
- Place of birth: Nkawkaw, Ghana
- Height: 1.90 m (6 ft 3 in)
- Position: Forward

Team information
- Current team: Tirana
- Number: 9

Youth career
- –2019: Glory FC
- 2019–2020: Storm Soccer Academy

Senior career*
Years	Team	Apps	(Gls)
2020–2022	Skënderbeu	79	(18)
2022–2024	Partizani	49	(6)
2024	Ballkani	6	(0)
2025	Vllaznia Shkodër	17	(1)
2025	Tirana	8	(0)
- * Club domestic league appearances and goals as of 5 January 2025

Alfred Mensah (born 8 August 1999) is a Ghanaian professional footballer who plays as a forward.
