= Jackson (footballer, born 1999) =

Brazilian footballer

Personal information
- Full name: Jackson Kênio Santos Laurentino
- Date of birth: 24 April 1999 (age 27)
- Place of birth: Santana do Ipanema, Brazil
- Height: 1.78 m (5 ft 10 in)
- Position: Forward

Team information
- Current team: Rustavi
- Number: 7

Senior career*
Years	Team	Apps	(Gls)
2017–2018	ABC	2	(0)
2018	Ypiranga		
2018	América-MG	0	(0)
2019	SK Vorwärts Steyr	5	(0)
2020	Murici		
2020–2023	Egnatia	83	(13)
2023–2025	İstanbulspor	46	(1)
2025	Riga FC	5	(0)
2025–2026	Auda	9	(2)
2026–	Rustavi	8	(1)
- * Club domestic league appearances and goals as of 17 November 2025

Jackson Kênio Santos Laurentino (born 24 April 1999), commonly known as Jackson, is a Brazilian footballer who plays as a midfielder for Erovnuli Liga club Rustavi.

== Career statistics ==
=== Club ===
As of 29 March 2019.

Club	Season	League			Cup		Other		Total	
Club	Season	Division	Apps	Goals	Apps	Goals	Apps	Goals	Apps	Goals
ABC	2017	Série B	2	0	0	0	0	0	2	0
ABC	2018	Série C	0	0	0	0	1 (Note: Appearances in the Campeonato Potiguar)	0	1	0
América-MG	2018	Série A	0	0	0	0	0	0	0	0
SK Vorwärts Steyr	2018–19	Second League	5	0	0	0	0	0	5	0
Career total			5	0	0	0	1	0	6	0
