= Esat Mala =

Albanian professional footballer (born 1998)

Personal information
- Full name: Esat Reshat Mala
- Date of birth: 18 October 1998 (age 28)
- Place of birth: Mushtisht, FR Yugoslavia
- Height: 1.74 m (5 ft 9 in)
- Position: Midfielder

Team information
- Current team: Teuta Durrës
- Number: 20

Youth career
- 2015–2017: Shkëndija Tiranë
- 2017: Hajduk Split

Senior career*
Years	Team	Apps	(Gls)
2017–2018	Ballkani	12	(6)
2018–2021	Partizani Tirana	103	(9)
2021–2022	Giresunspor	0	(0)
2021–2022	→ Partizani Tirana (loan)	33	(2)
2022–2026	Vllaznia Shkodër	132	(14)
2026–	Teuta Durrës	0	(0)

International career^{‡}
2018–2020	Albania U21	12	(1)
2022	Albania	1	(0)
- * Club domestic league appearances and goals as of 24 June 2026 ‡ National team caps and goals as of 28 October 2022

Esat Reshat Mala (born 18 October 1998) is a professional footballer who plays as a midfielder for Albanian club Teuta Durrës. Born in Yugoslavia, he represented Albania internationally.

== Club career ==
=== Ballkani ===
Mala spent the first part of the 2017–18 season in the First Football League of Kosovo representing Ballkani. In the meantime, he also trained with Partizani B squad. He made 12 appearances and scored 8 goals, also giving 10 assists during his spell at the club K.F.C Ballkani.

=== Partizani Tirana ===
On 27 December 2017, Partizani Tirana announced the acquisition of Mala, on a 2 1/2 years contract. He made his competitive debut on 4 February 2018 by playing in the second half of a 2–1 home win over Kamza. He quickly won his place in the starting lineup under Sulejman Starova, winning the league's player of the month award in March. Mala finished the season with 17 league appearances, including one cup appearance, as Partizani finished 5th in the league. Following the end of the season, he was named as one of the talents of the season by the association Sporti na bashkon.

== International career ==
On 28 May 2018. Mala made his debut with Albania U21 in a friendly match against Bosnia and Herzegovina U21 after being named in the starting line-up.

== Career statistics ==
As of 9 May 2018

Club	Season	League			Cup		Continental		Other		Total	
Club	Season	Division	Apps	Goals	Apps	Goals	Apps	Goals	Apps	Goals	Apps	Goals
Partizani Tirana	2017–18	Albanian Superliga	15	0	1	0	—				16	0
Partizani Tirana	Total		15	0	1	0	—				16	0
Career total			15	0	1	0	—				16	0

== Honours ==
=== Individual ===
- Albanian Superliga Player of the Month: March 2018
- Albanian Superliga Talent of the Season: second place 2017–18
