= KF Tirana U-21 =

Association football club in Albania

KF Tirana
- Full name: Klubi i Futbollit Tirana
- Nickname(s): Tirona U-21
- Founded: 2020; 5 years ago
- Ground: Skënder Halili Complex
- Capacity: 500
- Owners: Refik Halili (66%); Municipality of Tirana (34%)
- President: Refik Halili
- Head coach: Gentian Muca
- League: Kategoria Superiore U-21
- Website: http://www.kftirana.al/
Home colours	Away colours

Klubi i Futbollit Tirana Under-21 (KF Tirana U-21) is an Albanian football club based in the country's capital city, Tirana. The under-21 football club is part of the multi-disciplinary sports club SK Tirana, and is a feeder team of the senior side, KF Tirana. They play their home games at the Skënder Halili Complex in Tirana and they play in the Kategoria Superiore U-21.

== Players ==
=== Squad ===
As of 13 March 2025

Note: Flags indicate national team as defined under FIFA eligibility rules; some limited exceptions apply. Players may hold more than one non-FIFA nationality.

No.	Pos.	Nation	Player
1	GK	(Albania) ALB	Klajdi Muça
2	DF	(Italy) ITA	Giovani Cara
3	DF	(Albania) ALB	Sead Dojka
6	MF	(Albania) ALB	Marius Zena
8	MF	(Albania) ALB	Airton Ramaj
9	MF	(Albania) ALB	Rejan Isakaj
10	FW	(Albania) ALB	Greg Llupo
13	FW	(Albania) ALB	Andri Gjini
14	DF	(Albania) ALB	Leonel Qoshku (captain)
16	FW	(Albania) ALB	Ergi Bastari
17	MF	(Albania) ALB	Marsel Koromani
18	MF	(Albania) ALB	Dejvi Duro
19	FW	(Albania) ALB	Daniel Zaimi
20	MF	(Albania) ALB	Emiljano Mihana
21	MF	(Albania) ALB	Serxhio Vogli
22	MF	(Albania) ALB	Anxhelo Tahiraj
27	MF	(Albania) ALB	Gerald Marku

No.	Pos.	Nation	Player
28	DF	(Albania) ALB	Donald Dollaku
30	MF	(Albania) ALB	Enio Dervishleri
32	MF	(Albania) ALB	Oni Patushi
33	FW	(Albania) ALB	Ledian Hajdaraj
38	FW	(Albania) ALB	Valentin Pergjoni
40	MF	(Albania) ALB	Eris Reçi
42	MF	(Albania) ALB	Frenki Doda
55	FW	(Albania) ALB	Amin Tahiri
65	MF	(Albania) ALB	Santi Bregu
77	DF	(Switzerland) SUI	Vozza Noah
80	DF	(Albania) ALB	Enes Xhepa
89	FW	(Albania) ALB	Melsi Cereni
97	GK	(Albania) ALB	Rejan Cali

== Managers ==
- (Albania) Johanes Tafaj (1 January 2019 – 11 November 2020 )
- (Albania) Arber Abilaliaj (12 November 2020 – 7 December 2020 )
- (Albania) Olsi Uku (12 December 2020 – 25 January 2021 )
- (Albania) Arber Abilaliaj (26 January 2021 – 30 June 2021 )
- (Albania) Erbim Fagu (1 July 2021 – 10 June 2022 )
- (Albania) Gentian Muca (1 August 2022 – )

== Recent seasons ==
Year	Division	Position
2020–21	Kategoria Superiore U-21	7
2021–22	Kategoria Superiore U-21	4
2022–23	Kategoria Superiore U-21	9
2023–24	Kategoria Superiore U-21	4
2024–25	Kategoria Superiore U-21	8
