= 2022 Albanian Supercup =

Tirana	Vllaznia
3	2
- Date: 7 December 2022
- Venue: Arena Kombëtare, Tirana
- Referee: Eldorjan Hamiti

The 2022 Albanian Supercup was the 29th edition of the Albanian Supercup, an annual Albanian football match. The teams were decided by taking the trophy winners of the previous season's Kategoria Superiore champions and the winners of the Albanian Cup.

The match was contested by Tirana, champions of the 2021–22 Kategoria Superiore, and Vllaznia, the 2021–22 Albanian Cup winners.

== Details ==
7 December 2022
19:00 CET

Tirana	3–2	Vllaznia
Patrick 39'; Hasani 53'; Xhixha 90+2'		Mala 8'; Latifi 86' (pen.)

Arena Kombëtare, Tirana
Referee: Eldorjan Hamiti

Match officials:
Assistant referees:
Denis Rexha
Ridiger Çokaj
Fourth official:
Emanuela Rusta
Video Assistant Referee:
Enea Jorgji
Assistant video assistant referee:
Juxhin Xhaja

Match rules

- 90 minutes
- 30 minutes extra-time if the scores still level
- Penalty shoot-out if scores still level
- Six named substitutes, of which three may be used and additional fourth if extra-time is played

== See also ==
- 2021–22 Kategoria Superiore
- 2021–22 Albanian Cup
