= 2020–21 Kategoria Superiore =

Kategoria Superiore
- Season: 2020–21
- Dates: 4 November 2020 – 26 May 2021
- Champions: Teuta; 2nd title
- Relegated: Bylis; Apolonia
- Champions League: Teuta
- Europa Conference League: Vllaznia; Partizani; Laçi
- Matches: 180
- Goals: 378 (2.1 per match)
- Top goalscorer: Dejvi Bregu (16 goals)
- Biggest home win: Laçi 6–1 Apolonia (29 November 2020); Teuta 6–1 Apolonia (26 May 2021)
- Biggest away win: Apolonia 0–6 Vllaznia (18 April 2021)
- Highest scoring: Laçi 6–1 Apolonia (29 November 2020); Skënderbeu 4–3 Bylis (30 December 2020); Teuta 6–1 Apolonia (26 May 2021); Tirana 5–2 Apolonia (4 April 2021)
- Longest winning run: 5 matches Kukësi; Laçi
- Longest unbeaten run: 12 matches Teuta
- Longest winless run: 15 matches Apolonia
- Longest losing run: 6 matches Bylis
- All statistics correct as of 26 May 2021.

The 2020–21 Kategoria Superiore was the 82nd official season, or 85th season of top-tier football in Albania (including three unofficial championships during World War II) and the 21st season under the name Kategoria Superiore. The season ended on 26 May 2021. It was initially planned to begin on 12 September 2020 but it was delayed after all participating clubs decided to boycott the competition, until the government would meet their demands. After 2 months of negotiations, the clubs ended the boycott and agreed to begin the season on 4 November 2020. Teuta won the league title on 26 May 2021, on the final matchday.

The winners of this season's Kategoria Superiore earned a place in the first qualifying round of the 2021-22 Champions League, with the second and third placed clubs earning a place in the first qualifying round of the 2021-22 Europa Conference League.

== Teams ==
Two clubs have earned promotion from the Kategoria e Parë, Apolonia and Kastrioti. Flamurtari and Luftëtari were relegated to Kategoria e Parë at the conclusion of last season.

=== Locations ===
Locations of the 2020–21 Kategoria Superiore teams

Team	Home city	Stadium	Capacity	2019–20 season
Apolonia	Fier	Loni Papuçiu Stadium	6,800	Champion (Kategoria e Parë)
Bylis	Ballsh	Adush Muça Stadium	5,200	7th
Kastrioti	Krujë	Kamëz Stadium	5,500	Runner-up (Kategoria e Parë)
Kukësi	Kukës	Elbasan Arena	12,800	2nd
Laçi	Laç	Laçi Stadium	2,300	3rd
Partizani	Tirana	Elbasan Arena	12,800	6th
Skënderbeu	Korçë	Skënderbeu Stadium	12,343	4th
Teuta	Durrës	Niko Dovana Stadium	12,040	5th
Tirana	Tirana	Selman Stërmasi Stadium	9,500	Champion
Vllaznia	Shkodër	Loro Boriçi Stadium	16,000	8th

=== Stadiums ===
Apolonia	Bylis	Kastrioti	Kukësi	Laçi
Loni Papuçiu Stadium	Adush Muça Stadium	Kamëz Stadium	Elbasan Arena; UEFA stadium category	Laçi Stadium
Capacity: 6,800	Capacity: 5,200	Capacity: 5,500	Capacity: 12,800	Capacity: 5,300
Partizani	Skënderbeu	Teuta	Tirana	Vllaznia
Elbasan Arena; UEFA stadium category	Skënderbeu Stadium	Niko Dovana Stadium	Selman Stërmasi Stadium	Loro Boriçi Stadium; UEFA stadium category
Capacity: 12,800	Capacity: 12,343	Capacity: 12,040	Capacity: 9,500	Capacity: 16,000

=== Personnel and kits ===
Note: Flags indicate national team as has been defined under FIFA eligibility rules. Players and Managers may hold more than one non-FIFA nationality.

Team	President	Manager	Captain	Kit manufacturer	Shirt sponsor
Apolonia	(Albania) Koço Kokëdhima	(Italy) Fabrizio Cammarata	(Albania) Romeo Harizaj	(Spain) Joma	Abissnet
Bylis	(Albania) Besnik Kapllanaj	(Serbia) Veljko Dovedan	(Albania) Franc Ymeralilaj	(Germany) Uhlsport	−
Kastrioti	(Albania) Petro Kumi	(Albania) Ramadan Ndreu	(Albania) Emiliano Çela	(Germany) Uhlsport	Qafshtama
Kukësi	(Albania) Safet Gjici	(Albania) Mirel Josa	(North Macedonia) Agim Ibraimi	(Spain) Joma	Kevin Construction
Laçi	(Albania) Pashk Laska	(Albania) Shpëtim Duro	(Serbia) Aleksandar Ignjatović	(Germany) Uhlsport	Arbëria Palace
Partizani	(Albania) Gazmend Demi	(Albania) Ilir Daja	(Albania) Alban Hoxha	(Spain) Joma	−
Skënderbeu	(Albania) Ardian Takaj	(Albania) Migen Memelli	(Albania) Jorgo Meksi	(Germany) Uhlsport	Tona
Teuta	(Albania) Edmond Hasanbelliu	(Albania) Edi Martini	(Albania) Renato Arapi	(Italy) Macron	Caffè Pascucci
Tirana	(Albania) Refik Halili	(Albania) Orges Shehi	(Albania) Idriz Batha	(Germany) Uhlsport	−
Vllaznia	(Albania) Municipality of Shkodër	(Germany) Thomas Brdarić	(Albania) Erdenis Gurishta	−	Fujifilm

=== Managerial changes ===
Team	Outgoing manager	Manner of departure	Date of vacancy	Position in table	Incoming manager	Date of appointment
Kukësi	(Albania) Orges Shehi	Mutual consent	30 July 2020	Pre-season	(Albania) Skënder Gega	30 July 2020
Partizani	(Albania) Renaldo Kalari	End of caretaker spell	10 August 2020	Pre-season	(Albania) Ilir Daja	10 August 2020
Vllaznia	(Albania) Hysen Dedja	End of contract	10 August 2020	Pre-season	(Germany) Thomas Brdarić	10 August 2020
Skënderbeu	(Albania) Ilir Daja	Signed for Partizani	10 August 2020	Pre-season	(Albania) Julian Ahmataj	19 August 2020
Apolonia	(Albania) Artan Mërgjyshi	Mutual consent	31 August 2020	Pre-season	(Italy) Giovanni Colella	1 September 2020
Tirana	(Nigeria) Emmanuel Egbo	Sacked	12 November 2020	5th	(Albania) Nevil Dede	13 November 2020
Laçi	(Albania) Armando Cungu	Mutual consent	26 November 2020	8th	(Albania) Stavri Nica	26 November 2020
Apolonia	(Italy) Giovanni Colella	Resigned	30 November 2020	10th	(Albania) Nikolin Çoçlli	30 November 2020
Laçi	(Albania) Stavri Nica	Caretaker replaced	5 December 2020	6th	(Albania) Klevis Hima	5 December 2020
Laçi	(Albania) Klevis Hima	End of caretaker spell	12 December 2020	7th	(Albania) Shpëtim Duro	12 December 2020
Apolonia	(Albania) Nikolin Çoçlli	Sacked	17 December 2020	9th	(Albania) Bledar Borova	17 December 2020
Kukësi	(Albania) Skënder Gega	Resigned	27 December 2020	4th	(Albania) Rrahman Hallaçi	27 December 2020
Apolonia	(Albania) Bledar Borova	End of caretaker spell	2 January 2021	10th	(Italy) Fabrizio Cammarata	2 January 2021
Kukësi	(Albania) Rrahman Hallaçi	End of caretaker spell	25 January 2021	5th	(Albania) Mirel Josa	25 January 2021
Tirana	(Albania) Nevil Dede	Mutual consent	25 January 2021	6th	(Albania) Orges Shehi	27 January 2021
Skënderbeu	(Albania) Julian Ahmataj	Mutual consent	31 January 2021	9th	(Albania) Migen Memelli	3 February 2021

== League table ==
Pos	Team	Pld	W	D	L	GF	GA	GD	Pts	Qualification or relegation
1	Teuta (C)	36	17	15	4	42	16	+26	66	Qualification for the Champions League first qualifying round
2	Vllaznia	36	19	9	8	44	22	+22	66	Qualification for the Europa Conference League first qualifying round (Note: Vllaznia, the winners of the 2020–21 Albanian Cup, already qualified for European competition based on league position. Therefore, the Europa Conference League berth awarded to the Albanian Cup winners transfers to the fourth-placed team.)
3	Partizani	36	17	14	5	53	23	+30	65	Qualification for the Europa Conference League first qualifying round
4	Laçi	36	16	13	7	41	26	+15	61	Qualification for the Europa Conference League first qualifying round
5	Tirana	36	15	13	8	41	26	+15	58	
6	Kukësi	36	13	6	17	47	48	−1	45	
7	Skënderbeu	36	9	10	17	34	55	−21	37	
8	Kastrioti (O)	36	8	11	17	26	44	−18	35	Qualification for the relegation play-off
9	Bylis (R)	36	7	10	19	28	51	−23	31	Relegation to the 2021–22 Kategoria e Parë
10	Apolonia (R)	36	4	9	23	22	67	−45	21	Relegation to the 2021–22 Kategoria e Parë

Source: Albanian Football Association, Soccerway
Rules for classification: 1) Points; 2) Head-to-head points; 3) Head-to-head goal difference; 4) Head-to-head goals scored; 5) Goal difference; 6) Goals scored; 7) Draw.
(C) Champions; (O) Play-off winners; (R) Relegated

== Results ==
Clubs will play each other four times for a total of 36 matches each.

=== First half of season ===
Home \ Away	APO	BYL	KAS	KUK	LAÇ	PAR	SKË	TEU	TIR	VLL
Apolonia	—	2–2	2–1	1–3	1–0	0–3	1–0	0–1	0–1	0–1
Bylis	3–1	—	2–1	0–3	1–1	1–2	0–2	0–0	0–0	0–1
Kastrioti	1–1	1–0	—	1–0	1–0	2–1	2–2	0–1	1–1	0–3
Kukësi	1–0	2–1	0–1	—	1–0	0–2	3–1	0–3	0–0	0–1
Laçi	6–1	2–0	1–1	3–2	—	3–2	1–1	1–0	0–1	1–0
Partizani	1–1	0–0	2–0	4–1	0–0	—	4–0	0–0	1–0	0–0
Skënderbeu	1–1	4–3	1–2	0–4	1–1	1–2	—	1–3	1–1	0–2
Teuta	1–0	2–0	1–1	0–0	1–1	1–1	1–1	—	1–1	0–0
Tirana	3–0	0–0	2–1	2–0	0–1	0–0	2–0	0–1	—	1–1
Vllaznia	2–0	1–0	0–0	2–4	1–2	1–0	5–1	1–0	3–2	—

Source: Albanian Football Federation
Legend: Blue = home team win; Yellow = draw; Red = away team win.

=== Second half of season ===
Home \ Away	APO	BYL	KAS	KUK	LAÇ	PAR	SKË	TEU	TIR	VLL
Apolonia	—	0–1	2–1	0–3	0–1	1–1	1–2	0–2	1–1	0–6
Bylis	1–0	—	1–1	2–1	0–1	2–4	1–0	1–1	0–0	0–1
Kastrioti	0–0	1–1	—	0–3	0–0	0–3	0–2	1–2	1–2	0–1
Kukësi	1–1	2–1	1–2	—	1–2	1–2	0–1	0–2	2–2	3–1
Laçi	1–1	2–1	1–0	2–0	—	2–2	0–0	0–0	1–2	0–0
Partizani	1–0	3–0	3–1	4–0	1–1	—	0–1	0–0	0–0	0–1
Skënderbeu	2–0	2–1	0–1	2–1	0–2	1–1	—	0–1	0–0	1–1
Teuta	6–1	4–0	0–0	2–2	1–0	0–1	2–0	—	0–2	1–0
Tirana	5–2	2–0	1–0	0–2	0–1	1–2	3–1	0–1	—	1–0
Vllaznia	1–0	1–2	1–0	0–0	2–0	0–0	2–1	0–0	1–2	—

Source: Albanian Football Federation
Legend: Blue = home team win; Yellow = draw; Red = away team win.

=== Relegation play-off ===
30 May 2021
16:00

Kastrioti	2−1	Tomori
Mehmeti 45'; Rezi 62'		Qato 90+3'

Kamëz Stadium, Kamëz
Referee: Kridens Meta

Both clubs remained in their respective leagues.

== Season statistics ==
=== Scoring ===
==== Top scorers ====
Rank	Player	Club	Goals
1	(Albania) Dejvi Bregu	Teuta	16
2	(North Macedonia) Agim Ibraimi	Kukësi	15
2	(Nigeria) Patrick Friday Eze	Kukësi	15
4	(Albania) Ardit Hoxhaj	Vllaznia	12
5	(Bosnia and Herzegovina) Haris Dilaver	Vllaznia	11
6	(Nigeria) Beji Anthony	Bylis	10
6	(Brazil) Devid	Kastrioti	10
6	(Albania) Lorenco Vila	Teuta	10

=== Discipline ===
==== Player ====
- Most yellow cards: 15
  - (Albania) Indrit Prodani (Kastrioti)
- Most red cards: 2
  - (Nigeria) Kyrian Nwabueze (Laçi)

== Awards ==
=== Annual awards ===
Award	Winner	Club
Manager of the Season	(Germany) Thomas Brdarić	Vllaznia
Player of the Season	(Albania) Dejvi Bregu	Teuta
Young Player of the Season	(Albania) Marsel Ismailgeci	Tirana

Team of the Year
Goalkeeper	(Kosovo) Visar Bekaj (Tirana)			
Defenders	(Albania) Erdenis Gurishta (Vllaznia)	(North Macedonia) Mevlan Adili (Vllaznia)	(North Macedonia) Egzon Belica (Partizani)	(Albania) Erion Hoxhallari (Tirana)
Midfielders	(Albania) Juljan Shehu (Laçi)		(Albania) Regi Lushkja (Laçi)	(Albania) Albano Aleksi (Teuta)
Forwards	(Albania) Jasir Asani (Partizani)		(Albania) Dejvi Bregu (Teuta)	(North Macedonia) Agim Ibraimi (Kukësi)

== See also ==
- Kategoria Superiore

== Notes and references ==
=== Notes ===
1. Kastrioti played their 2020–21 home games at the Kamëz Stadium in Kamëz, since their venue, Kastrioti Stadium, is not suitable for Kategoria Superiore matches.
2. Kukësi played their 2020–21 home games at the Elbasan Arena in Elbasan, due to the reconstruction of the Zeqir Ymeri Stadium in Kukës.
3. Partizani played their 2020–21 home games at the Elbasan Arena in Elbasan. Their new home ground, Partizani Complex, is currently under construction.
