= 2024–25 Albanian Cup =

Kupa e Shqipërisë

Tournament details
- Country: Albania
- Teams: 42

Final positions
- Champions: Dinamo City
- Runners-up: Egnatia

Tournament statistics
- Matches played: 39
- Goals scored: 152 (3.9 per match)
- Top goal scorer(s): Peter Itodo (8 goals)

The 2024–25 Albanian Cup (Albanian: Kupa e Shqipërisë) was the seventy-third season of Albania's annual cup competition, the Albanian Cup. There were 42 participating teams. The winners qualified for the 2025–26 UEFA Conference League second qualifying round.

Egnatia were the defending champions, but lost on penalties against Dinamo City in the final after a 2−2 draw. It was the club's fourteenth Albanian Cup title overall.

== Participating teams ==
Kategoria Superiore; The 10 clubs of the 2024–25 season	Kategoria e Parë; Twelve clubs of the 2024–25 season	Kategoria e Dytë; Twenty clubs of the 2024–25 season
Bylis; Dinamo City; Egnatia; Elbasani; Laçi; Partizani; Skënderbeu; Teuta; Tirana; Vllaznia	Apolonia; Besa; Burreli; Erzeni; Flamurtari; Kastrioti; Korabi; Kukësi; Lushnja; Pogradeci; Valbona; Vora	Adriatiku; Albanët; Basania; Besëlidhja; Butrinti; Devolli; Gramshi; Iliria; Këlcyra; Luftëtari; Luzi 2008; Murlani; Naftëtari; Oriku; Shkumbini; Sopoti; Tërbuni; Tomori; Turbina; Veleçiku

== Format and seeding ==
Teams will enter the competition at various stages, as follows:

- First phase (one-legged fixtures)
  - Preliminary round: four teams from Kategoria e Dytë will start the tournament
  - Round of 64: the two winners will be joined by 14 Kategoria e Dytë teams, 12 Kategoria e Parë teams, and 2 teams from Kategoria Superiore
  - Round of 32: the 16 winners will face each other
- Second phase
  - Round of 16 (one-legged): the eight winners will be joined by Kategoria Superiore clubs, seeded 1–8
  - Quarter-finals (two-legged): the eight winners will face each other
  - Semi-finals (two-legged): the four winners will face each other
  - Final (one-legged): the two winners will face each other

== Round dates ==
Phase	Round	Clubs remaining	Clubs involved	From previous round	Entries in this round	First leg	Second leg
First stage	Preliminary round	42	4	none	4	25 September 2024	
First stage	Round of 64	40	32	2	30	16 October 2024	
First stage	Round of 32	24	16	16	none	20 November 2024	
Second stage	Round of 16	16	16	8	8	14 & 15 January 2025	
Second stage	Quarter-finals	8	8	8	none	5 & 6 February 2025	25 & 26 February 2025
Second stage	Semi-finals	4	4	4	none	2 & 3 April 2025	23 April 2025
Second stage	Final	2	2	2	none	1 May 2025	

== Preliminary round ==
A total of four teams from Kategoria e Dytë competed in this round, two of which advanced.

Team 1	Score	Team 2
Naftëtari (III)	4–2	Basania (III)
Murlani (III)	3–5	Albanët (III)

25 September 2024	Naftëtari	4–2	Basania	Bashkim Sulejmani Stadium, Kuçovë
14:00 CEST	Kajo 22' (pen.); Adebayou 66', 87'; Gjishti 90'		Konate 5', 52'	Referee: Endrit Zhuli

Naftëtari advanced to the round of 64.

25 September 2024	Murlani	3–5	Albanët	Barbullush Stadium, Barbullush
14:00 CEST	Cubi 35'; Uku 56', 73'		Meçuli 16'; Xhabafti 26'; Ahmati 38', 90'; Alushi 75' (pen.)

Albanët advanced to the round of 64.

== Round of 64 ==
A total of 32 teams (2 winners from the preliminary round, 14 teams from Kategoria e Dytë, 12 teams from Kategoria e Parë and 2 Kategoria Superiore teams) competed in this round, 16 of which advanced to the second round.

Team 1	Score	Team 2
Erzeni (II)	1−0	Naftëtari (III)
Kukësi (II)	6−0	Albanët (III)
Elbasani (I)	4−0	Turbina (III)
Bylis (I)	5−1	Adriatiku (III)
Flamurtari (II)	15−1	Devolli (III)
Apolonia (II)	3−0	Këlcyra (III)
Vora (II)	6−1	Gramshi (III)
Korabi (II)	5−2	Veleçiku (III)
Kastrioti (II)	3−1	Butrinti (III)
Lushnja (II)	0−1	Oriku (III)
Burreli (II)	4−0	Sopoti (III)
Besa (II)	4−3	Tërbuni (III)
Luzi 2008 (III)	5−0	Shkumbini (III)
Tomori (III)	1−2	Iliria (III)
Pogradeci (II)	2−0	Luftëtari (III)
Valbona (II)	1−0	Besëlidhja (III)

16 October 2024	Erzeni	1−0	Naftëtari	Tofik Jashari Stadium, Shijak
13:30 CEST	Radovani 18'			Referee: Geisi Velçani

Erzeni advanced to the round of 32.

16 October 2024	Kukësi	6−0	Albanët	Kukës Arena, Kukës
13:30 CEST	Jaiyeola 28', 40'; Mejdani 32'; Metani 63', 65'; Hilaj 72'			Referee: Egli Menkshi

Kukësi advanced to the round of 32.

16 October 2024	Elbasani	4−0	Turbina	Kompleksi Sportiv Shefqet Lamçja, Elbasan
13:30 CEST	Gjoni 10', 20'; Melo 33'; Halili 81'			Referee: Besnard Kaimi

Elbasani advanced to the round of 32.

16 October 2024	Bylis	5−1	Adriatiku	Adush Muçaj Stadium, Ballsh
13:30 CEST	Treni 8'; Çelaj 36'; Bruno 44'; Gjata 45'; Laércio 88'		Hasani 60'	Referee: Erjon Bylykbashi

Bylis advanced to the round of 32.

16 October 2024	Flamurtari	15−1	Devolli	Flamurtari Stadium, Vlorë
13:30 CEST	Beqja 9'; Selimi 11'; Kacbufi 32'; Pjeshka 40'; Hoxhaj 44', 53'; Shkurtaj 50', 51', 70', 82', 87'; Adem 58'; Hasa 60'; Oshafi 75', 84'		Ivani 86' (pen.)	Referee: Erald Demiraj

Flamurtari advanced to the round of 32.

16 October 2024	Apolonia	3−0	Këlcyra	Loni Papuçiu Stadium, Fier
13:30 CEST	Eneh 77'; Umejiego 81'; Onywuenyi 90'			Referee: Kristi Hoxha

Apolonia advanced to the round of 32.

16 October 2024	Vora	6−1	Gramshi	Vorë Stadium, Vorë
13:30 CEST	Lika 19', 45'; Marinaj 30'; Rushiti 42'; Hoxha 56'; Nikqi 73'		Dedja 44'	Referee: Xhulian Bacaj

Vora advanced to the round of 32.

16 October 2024	Korabi	5−2	Veleçiku	Fusha e Sportit Ahmetaq, Ahmetaq
13:30 CEST	Ndrejaj 20'; Shehu 59' (pen.), 74', 80'; Reçi 90'		Shekaj 41' (pen.); Pjetracaj 73'	Referee: Mario Shabanaj

Korabi advanced to the round of 32.

16 October 2024	Kastrioti	3−1	Butrinti	Redi Maloku Stadium, Fushë-Krujë
13:30 CEST	Maurício 20'; Ajine 75', 88'		Córdoba 69'	Referee: Granit Sulko

Kastrioti advanced to the round of 32.

16 October 2024	Lushnja	0−1	Oriku	Roza Haxhiu Stadium, Lushnjë
13:30 CEST			Shkreli 41'	Referee: Gerard Çokaj

Oriku advanced to the round of 32.

16 October 2024	Burreli	4−0	Sopoti	Liri Ballabani Stadium, Burrel
13:30 CEST	Ferruku 11' (pen.); Sina 42'; Marllon 44'; Arango Aristizabal 69'			Referee: Memet Koçi

Burreli advanced to the round of 32.

16 October 2024	Besa	4−3	Tërbuni	Kompleksi Sportiv Egnatia, Lekaj
13:30 CEST	Kurt 17', 44'; Goxha 36'; Alexandre 69'		Kaçubela 54', 79'; Gjini 86'	Referee: Egli Spahiu

Besa advanced to the round of 32.

16 October 2024	Luzi 2008	5−0	Shkumbini	Luz i Vogël Stadium, Luz i Vogël
13:30 CEST	Meta 9' (o.g.); Xhika 36' (pen.); Morina 79', 85'; Hasa 81'			Referee: Klajdi Qendraj

Luzi 2008 advanced to the round of 32.

16 October 2024	Tomori	1−2	Iliria	Tomori Stadium, Berat
13:30 CEST	Ngene 41'		A. Selmani 90+2'; B. Selmani 90+5'	Referee: Ardit Merdanaj

Iliria advanced to the round of 32.

16 October 2024	Pogradeci	2−0	Luftëtari	Gjorgji Kyçyku Stadium, Pogradec
13:30 CEST	Lila 24'; Kastrati 67'			Referee: Ervin Kotemelo

Pogradeci advanced to the round of 32.

16 October 2024	Valbona	1−0	Besëlidhja	Internacional Complex, Pezë Helmës
13:30 CEST	Lawal 87'			Referee: Rebani Gemi

Valbona advanced to the round of 32.

== Round of 32 ==
The 16 winning teams from the first round competed in the second round, 8 of which advanced to the round of 16.

Team 1	Score	Team 2
Erzeni (II)	2–1	Valbona (II)
Kukësi (II)	2–1	Pogradeci (II)
Elbasani (I)	3−1	Iliria (III)
Bylis (I)	3–1	Luzi 2008 (III)
Flamurtari (II)	0–1	Besa (II)
Vora (II)	3–1	Oriku (III)
Apolonia (II)	3–1	Burreli (II)
Korabi (II)	1–4	Kastrioti (II)

20 November 2024	Erzeni	2–1	Valbona	Tofik Jashari Stadium, Shijak
13:00 CET	Duraku 67'; Yori 81'		Krasniqi 90+4' (pen.)	Referee: Granit Sulko

Erzeni advanced to the round of 16.

20 November 2024	Kukësi	2–1	Pogradeci	Kukës Arena, Kukës
13:00 CET	Beshiraj 60'; Mejdani 80'		Panadić 9'	Referee: Mikele Dyrmishi

Kukësi advanced to the round of 16.

20 November 2024	Elbasani	3−1	Iliria	Elbasan Arena, Elbasan
13:00 CET	Hila 45+3'; Melo 52'; Abdiu 82'		Veriu 4'	Referee: Erald Demiraj

Elbasani advanced to the round of 16.

20 November 2024	Bylis	3–1	Luzi 2008	Adush Muçaj Stadium, Ballsh
13:00 CET	Treni 41'; Abazaj 44'; Igor 66'		Longcat 79'	Referee: Ardit Merdanaj

Bylis advanced to the round of 16.

20 November 2024	Flamurtari	0–1	Besa	Flamurtari Stadium, Vlorë
13:00 CET			Kanu 4'	Referee: Indrit Myrtja

Besa advanced to the round of 16.

20 November 2024	Vora	3–1	Oriku	Vorë Stadium, Vorë
13:00 CET	Ismaili 51'; Dalipi 54'; Shehi 68'		Zholi 15'	Referee: Emanuela Rusta

Vora advanced to the round of 16.

20 November 2024	Apolonia	3–1	Burreli	Loni Papuçiu Stadium, Fier
13:00 CET	Eneh 26'; Umejiego 37'; Trifoni 90+3'		Arango 42'	Referee: Mario Shabanaj

Apolonia advanced to the round of 16.

20 November 2024	Korabi	1–4	Kastrioti	Internacional Complex, Pezë Helmës
13:00 CET	Shehu 76'		Musaj 5'; Murati 41'; Çela 53'; Biba 59'	Referee: Memet Koçi

Kastrioti advanced to the round of 16.

=== Bracket ===
Round of 16
Tirana	1
Bylis (a.e.t.)	2
Egnatia	4
Kastrioti	0
Laçi	3
Kukësi	1
Partizani	2
Apolonia	0
Teuta	0
Elbasani (a.e.t.)	2
Vllaznia (a.e.t.)	1
Besa	0
Dinamo City	6
Erzeni	1
Skënderbeu	1
Vora	0

Quarter-finals
Bylis	1	2	3
Egnatia	3	2	5
Laçi	0	1	1
Partizani	0	2	2
Elbasani	0	3	3 (4)
Vllaznia (p)	0	3	3 (5)
Dinamo City (a.e.t.)	0	4	4
Skënderbeu	2	0	2

Semi-finals
Egnatia (a.e.t.)	0	2	2
Partizani	1	0	1
Vllaznia	0	3	3
Dinamo City	0	4	4

Final
Egnatia	2 (4)
Dinamo City (p)	2 (5)

== Round of 16 ==
The round of 16 matches were played between the eight winners from the second round and clubs seeded 1–8 in the 2023–24 Kategoria Superiore.

15 January 2025	Dinamo City	6−1	Erzeni	Elbasan Arena, Elbasan
13:30 CET	Itodo 12', 58', 61'; Bregu 37' (pen.); Nani 71'; Vila 87'		Hoxha 19' (o.g.)	Referee: Laver Alla

Dinamo City advanced to the quarter finals.

15 January 2025	Teuta	0−2 (a.e.t.)	Elbasani	Niko Dovana Stadium, Durrës
17:00 CET			Tsague 98'; Lleshi 113'	Referee: Erjon Bastari

Elbasani advanced to the quarter finals.

15 January 2025	Vllaznia	1−0 (a.e.t.)	Besa	Loro Boriçi Stadium, Shkodër
17:00 CET	Çoba 108'			Referee: Emanuela Rusta

Vllaznia advanced to the quarter finals.

15 January 2025	Partizani	2−0	Apolonia	Arena e Demave, Tirana
17:00 CET	Keko 48', 66'			Referee: Daniel Vrapi

Partizani advanced to the quarter finals.

14 January 2025	Laçi	3−1	Kukësi	Laçi Stadium, Laç
13:00 CET	Tresa 45+7'; Bullari 45+10' (pen.), 66'		Badjie 20'	Referee: Klodian Shahini

Laçi advanced to the quarter finals.

14 January 2025	Tirana	1−2 (a.e.t.)	Bylis	Vora Stadium, Vorë
13:00 CET	Ernest 10'		Marku 22'; Ruçi 113'	Referee: Silvio Dyrmishi

Bylis advanced to the quarter finals.

15 January 2025	Skënderbeu	1−0	Vora	Devolli Stadium, Bilisht
13:00 CET	Rabiu 71'

Skënderbeu advanced to the quarter finals.

15 January 2025	Egnatia	4−0	Kastrioti	Egnatia Arena, Rrogozhinë
13:00 CET	Aliyev 17'; Ndreca 77' (pen.); Melo 82'; Doukouo 89'			Referee: Adrian Beqiraj

Egnatia advanced to the quarter finals.

== Quarter-finals ==
The quarter-final matches were played between clubs advancing from the round of 16.

5 February 2025	Bylis	1−3	Egnatia	Adush Muçaj Stadium, Ballsh
13:30 CET	Ruçi 68'		Ujka 23'; Wotlai 34'; Kasa 66'	Referee: Emanuela Rusta

26 February 2025	Egnatia	2−2	Bylis	Egnatia Arena, Rrogozhinë
13:30 CET	Xhemajli 41'; Bakayoko 71'		Gjata 24' (pen.); Kane 79'	Referee: Silvio Dyrmishi

Egnatia advanced to the semi finals.

5 February 2025	Elbasani	0−0	Vllaznia	Elbasan Arena, Elbasan
17:00 CET				Referee: Daniel Vrapi

25 February 2025	Vllaznia	3−3 (a.e.t.) (5−4 p)	Elbasani	Loro Boriçi Stadium, Shkodër
17:00 CET	Lila 15' (o.g.); Gurishta 56'; Krymi 90'		Lajthia 25', 49'; Olberkis 90+6'	Referee: Klodian Shahini
	Penalties
	Gurishta (penalty scored); Bajrami (penalty missed); Deliu (penalty missed); Qato (penalty scored); Balaj (penalty scored); Gruda (penalty scored); Krymi (penalty scored)		(penalty scored) Loukili; (penalty scored) Musta; (penalty missed) Lila; (penalty scored) Dros; (penalty missed) Kasa; (penalty scored) Gjoni; (penalty missed) Olberkis

Vllaznia advanced to the semi finals.

5 February 2025	Laçi	0−0	Partizani	Laçi Stadium, Laç
13:30 CET				Referee: Dorjan Maletaj

25 February 2025	Partizani	2−1	Laçi	Arena e Demave, Tirana
17:00 CET	Podstrelov 17'; Keko 89'		Bibo 56'	Referee: Eldorjan Hamiti

Partizani advanced to the semi finals.

6 February 2025	Dinamo City	0−2	Skënderbeu	Elbasan Arena, Elbasan
17:00 CET			Charles 50'; Lorran 56' (o.g.)	Referee: Erjon Bylykbashi

26 February 2025	Skënderbeu	0−4 (a.e.t.)	Dinamo City	Skënderbeu Stadium, Korçë
16:30 CET			Nasto 30' (o.g.); Itodo 90+4'; Qardaku 94'; Zabërgja 115'	Referee: Emanuela Rusta

Dinamo City advanced to the semi finals.

== Semi-finals ==
The two-legged semi-finals were played between clubs advancing from the quarter-finals.

2 April 2025	Vllaznia	0−0	Dinamo City	Loro Boriçi Stadium, Shkodër
19:00 CEST				Referee: Kreshnik Cjapi

23 April 2025	Dinamo City	4−3	Vllaznia	Elbasan Arena, Elbasan
19:00 CEST	Itodo 17', 51'; Zabërgja 36', 59'		Gruda 72'; Balaj 80'; Kahrimanovic 86'	Referee: Kreshnik Barjamaj

Dinamo City advanced to the final.

3 April 2025	Egnatia	0−1	Partizani	Egnatia Arena, Rrogozhinë
19:00 CEST			Keko 85' (pen.)	Referee: Kreshnik Barjamaj

23 April 2025	Partizani	0−2 (a.e.t.)	Egnatia	Arena e Demave, Tirana
19:00 CEST			Xhemajli 76'; Guindo 93'	Referee: Olsid Ferataj

Egnatia advanced to the final.

== Final ==
1 May 2025
18:00 CEST

Egnatia	2−2 (a.e.t.)	Dinamo City
Guindo 45+3'; Bakayoko 90+5'		Itodo 17', 61'
Penalties
Aleksi (penalty missed); Bakayoko (penalty scored); Ujka (penalty scored); Zejnullai (penalty scored); Xhemajli (penalty scored); Yahaya (penalty missed)	4−5	(penalty scored) Aliji; (penalty scored) Qardaku; (penalty missed) Meksi; (penalty scored) Teqja; (penalty scored) Zabërgja; (penalty scored) Dita

Elbasan Arena, Elbasan
Referee: Eldorjan Hamiti

== Top goalscorers ==
Rank	Player	Club	Goals
1	(Nigeria) Peter Itodo	Dinamo City	8
2	(Albania) Vasil Shkurtaj	Flamurtari	5
3	(Albania) Albers Keko	Partizani	4
3	(Albania) Ertigen Shehu	Korabi	4
5	(Kosovo) Baton Zabërgja	Dinamo City	3
5	(Brazil) Léo Melo	Egnatia/Elbasani	3
