= 2025–26 Kategoria e Parë =

Kategoria e Parë
- Season: 2025–26
- Champions: Laçi; 3rd title
- Promoted: Laçi; Skënderbeu
- Relegated: Luftëtari; Apolonia; Lushnja
- Matches: 198
- Goals: 480 (2.42 per match)
- Top goalscorer: Saleh Nasr (18 goals)
- Biggest home win: Laçi 4−0 Burreli (25 October 2025); Pogradeci 4−0 Kastrioti (25 October 2025); Pogradeci 5−1 Kastrioti (4 April 2026); Pogradeci 5−1 Kukësi (11 April 2026); Skënderbeu 4−0 Kastrioti (19 April 2026)
- Biggest away win: Lushnja 1−5 Laçi (28 February 2026)
- Highest scoring: Apolonia 4−4 Burreli (3 May 2026); Laçi 5−3 Besa (18 March 2026)
- Longest winning run: 13 matches Laçi
- Longest unbeaten run: 28 matches Laçi
- Longest winless run: 19 matches Apolonia
- Longest losing run: 6 matches Lushnja

The 2025–26 Kategoria e Parë was the 78th official season of the Albanian football second-tier since its establishment. The season began on 23 August 2025 and ended on 4 May 2026. There were 12 teams competing this season. The winning and runner-up teams gained promotion to the 2026–27 Kategoria Superiore. The promotion play-offs winner played a promotion play-off match against the 8th ranked team of the 2025–26 Kategoria Superiore. Laçi and Skënderbeu were promoted to the 2026–27 Kategoria Superiore. Apolonia, Luftëtari and Lushnja were relegated to the 2026–27 Kategoria e Dytë.

== Changes from last season ==
=== Team changes ===
==== From Kategoria e Parë ====
Promoted to Kategoria Superiore:

- Flamurtari
- Vora

Relegated to Kategoria e Dytë:

- Erzeni
- Valbona

==== To Kategoria e Parë ====
Relegated from Kategoria Superiore:

- Laçi
- Skënderbeu

Promoted from Kategoria e Dytë:

- Iliria
- Luftëtari

== Teams ==
2025–26 Kategoria e Parë teams.

=== Stadia by capacity and locations ===
Team	Location	Stadium	Capacity
Apolonia	Fier	Loni Papuçiu Stadium	3,159
Besa	Kavajë	Luz i Vogël Stadium	550
Burreli	Burrel	Liri Ballabani Stadium	3,000
Iliria	Fushë-Krujë	Redi Maloku Stadium	1,000
Kastrioti	Krujë	Redi Maloku Stadium	1,000
Korabi	Peshkopi	Korabi Stadium	6,000
Kukësi	Kukës	Kukës Arena	6,322
Laçi	Laç	Laçi Stadium	2,271
Luftëtari	Gjirokastër	Gjirokastra Stadium	8,400
Lushnja	Lushnjë	Roza Haxhiu Stadium	8,500
Pogradeci	Pogradec	Gjorgji Kyçyku Stadium	10,700
Skënderbeu	Korçë	Skënderbeu Stadium	5,800

=== Personnel and kits ===
Note: Flags indicate national team as has been defined under FIFA eligibility rules. Players and Managers may hold more than one non-FIFA nationality.

Team	President	Manager	Captain	Kit manufacturer	Shirt sponsor
Apolonia	(Albania) Koço Kokëdhima	(Serbia) Marko Jovanović	(Albania) Ersildjo Asllanaj	Joma	
Besa	(Albania) Nexhat Bizhdili	(Albania) Gugash Magani	(Albania) Redon Danaj	Macron	
Burreli	(Albania) Agron Malaj	(Albania) Samuel Nikaj	(Albania) Aleks Dedgjonaj	Givova	Flumen Park
Iliria	(Albania) Nazmi Selmani	(Argentina) Matías Tatangelo	(Albania) Adolf Selmani	Dominer	Carpe Diem Beach
Kastrioti	(Albania) Alban Vogli	(Albania) Ramadan Ndreu	(Albania) Dejvid Kapllani	Joma	Qafshtama
Korabi	(Albania) Fehmi Mëziu	(Albania) Alfred Deliallisi	(Albania) Sokol Mziu	Joma	
Kukësi	(Albania) Atilio Biba	(Albania) Bledi Kadiu	(Albania) Klevis Hilaj	Suzmar	Lajthiza
Laçi	(Albania) Pashk Laska	(Kosovo) Naci Şensoy	(Albania) Stiven Bibo	Macron	
Luftëtari	(Albania) Mustafa Hysi	(Albania) Neritan Novi	(Albania) Behar Ramadani	Macron	Pik
Lushnja	(Albania) Eriselda Sefa	(Albania) Artan Bano	(Albania) Mikel Canka	Givova	La Bontà
Pogradeci	(Albania) Ilir Xhakolli	(Albania) Emiliano Çela	(Albania) Vangjel Zguro	Macron	Armaar Group
Skënderbeu	(Albania) Ardian Takaj	(Albania) Ernest Gjoka	(Albania) Marco Alia	Cohl's	

== League table ==
Pos	Team	Pld	W	D	L	GF	GA	GD	Pts	Promotion or relegation
1	Laçi (C, P)	33	24	7	2	60	23	+37	79	Promotion to 2026–27 Kategoria Superiore
2	Skënderbeu (P)	33	24	5	4	57	25	+32	77	Promotion to 2026–27 Kategoria Superiore
3	Pogradeci	33	20	8	5	63	31	+32	68	Promotion play-off to 2026–27 Kategoria Superiore
4	Iliria	33	11	12	10	32	33	−1	45	Promotion play-off to 2026–27 Kategoria Superiore
5	Besa	33	10	9	14	41	43	−2	39	Promotion play-off to 2026–27 Kategoria Superiore
6	Kastrioti	33	11	6	16	44	57	−13	39	Promotion play-off to 2026–27 Kategoria Superiore
7	Burreli	33	9	10	14	27	45	−18	37	
8	Korabi	33	8	12	13	31	39	−8	36	
9	Luftëtari (R)	33	7	13	13	37	43	−6	34	Relegation play-out to 2026–27 Kategoria e Dytë
10	Kukësi (O)	33	8	7	18	31	50	−19	31	Relegation play-out to 2026–27 Kategoria e Dytë
11	Apolonia (R)	33	6	10	17	31	44	−13	28	Relegation to 2026–27 Kategoria e Dytë
12	Lushnja (R)	33	5	11	17	26	47	−21	26	Relegation to 2026–27 Kategoria e Dytë

Rules for classification: 1) Points; 2) Head-to-head points; 3) Head-to-head goal difference; 4) Head-to-head goals scored; 5) Goal difference; 6) Goals scored; 7) Draw.
(C) Champions; (O) Play-off winners; (P) Promoted; (R) Relegated

=== Rounds 1–22 ===
Home \ Away	APO	BES	BUR	ILI	KAS	KOR	KUK	LAÇ	LUF	LUS	POG	SKË
Apolonia	—	2–0	1–2	0–0	2–0	0–3	2–0	0–2	1–1	0–0	2–2	2–3
Besa	1–2	—	2–0	3–1	1–1	3–1	3–1	0–0	1–1	1–1	1–1	2–3
Burreli	2–0	2–1	—	1–1	0–0	0–3	2–0	1–2	1–0	0–0	2–0	1–2
Iliria	2–0	2–1	2–2	—	0–1	2–1	1–0	1–2	1–1	2–1	0–0	0–2
Kastrioti	1–0	2–1	1–1	1–1	—	0–0	2–1	2–2	3–1	2–1	2–4	3–2
Korabi	0–0	0–0	0–1	2–1	3–2	—	1–0	0–2	1–1	2–0	1–2	0–0
Kukësi	2–1	1–0	2–0	0–1	0–1	4–2	—	0–3	2–2	1–1	1–3	0–1
Laçi	1–1	2–1	4–0	1–1	3–1	2–0	2–1	—	1–0	2–1	0–0	2–1
Luftëtari	0–2	1–2	0–0	1–2	2–1	1–1	3–1	0–0	—	1–2	2–3	0–1
Lushnja	0–1	0–1	0–1	1–0	3–2	2–0	0–0	0–1	1–1	—	1–2	1–1
Pogradeci	1–0	0–0	2–0	0–0	4–0	3–1	2–0	1–0	2–3	0–0	—	0–1
Skënderbeu	3–2	1–0	3–0	2–0	2–1	3–2	3–0	1–0	1–1	4–3	1–2	—

Legend: Blue = home team win; Yellow = draw; Red = away team win.
For upcoming matches, an "a" indicates there is an article about the rivalry between the two participants.

=== Rounds 23–33 ===
Home \ Away	APO	BES	BUR	ILI	KAS	KOR	KUK	LAÇ	LUF	LUS	POG	SKË
Apolonia		1–2	4–4							0–0	1–2	0–1
Besa			1–0			1–1				0–0	2–3	0–1
Burreli				0–0		0–0	0–0			1–0	0–3	0–1
Iliria	2–1	1–0			1–0		1–1	1–1	1–2			
Kastrioti	1–0	2–3	5–2				0–2	1–2	1–2			
Korabi	0–0			1–1	1–0			0–1	1–0			
Kukësi	2–0	2–1				1–1			0–0	3–2		
Laçi	2–1	5–3	3–1				2–1		2–1		2–0	
Luftëtari	2–2	2–3	2–0								3–0	0–3
Lushnja				0–3	1–4	2–1		1–5	0–0			
Pogradeci				3–0	5–1	4–1	5–1			3–1		1–1
Skënderbeu				1–0	4–0	0–0	2–1	0–1		2–0		

Legend: Blue = home team win; Yellow = draw; Red = away team win.
For upcoming matches, an "a" indicates there is an article about the rivalry between the two participants.

=== Positions by round ===
The table lists the positions of teams after each week of matches.

Team ╲ Round	1	2	3	4	5	6	7	8	9	10	11	12	13	14	15	16	17	18	19	20	21	22	23	24	25	26	27	28	29	30	31	32	33
Laçi	3	1	2	2	2	2	2	2	2	2	2	2	2	2	2	2	2	2	2	2	2	2	2	2	2	2	2	2	2	2	2	2	1
Skënderbeu	1	2	1	1	1	1	1	1	1	1	1	1	1	1	1	1	1	1	1	1	1	1	1	1	1	1	1	1	1	1	1	1	2
Pogradeci	9	9	3	5	4	6	7	4	3	3	3	3	3	3	3	3	3	3	3	3	3	3	3	3	3	3	3	3	3	3	3	3	3
Iliria	11	11	12	8	6	3	3	3	4	4	4	4	5	6	5	5	8	8	9	6	6	6	5	5	4	4	4	4	4	4	4	4	4
Besa	4	6	10	11	11	11	10	11	10	8	10	10	8	9	8	7	5	6	6	7	7	7	7	7	7	7	7	8	6	6	5	5	5
Kastrioti	5	12	11	12	12	12	11	12	11	9	8	7	6	8	6	6	4	4	4	5	4	4	4	4	5	5	5	5	5	5	6	6	6
Burreli	12	3	4	4	5	7	4	6	6	5	5	5	7	5	7	9	6	5	5	4	5	5	6	6	6	6	6	6	7	8	8	7	7
Korabi	6	7	9	10	9	8	5	7	7	7	6	8	9	7	9	8	9	9	7	8	8	8	8	8	8	8	8	7	8	7	7	8	8
Luftëtari	7	5	7	6	8	9	9	8	8	10	11	11	11	11	11	11	11	11	11	11	11	11	11	11	11	11	10	12	12	12	9	9	9
Kukësi	2	4	5	9	10	10	12	10	12	12	12	12	12	12	12	12	12	12	12	12	12	12	12	12	12	12	12	10	9	9	10	10	10
Apolonia	10	10	6	3	3	4	6	5	5	6	7	6	4	4	4	4	7	7	8	9	9	9	9	9	9	9	9	9	10	10	11	11	11
Lushnja	8	8	8	7	7	5	8	9	9	11	9	9	10	10	10	10	10	10	10	10	10	10	10	10	10	10	11	11	11	11	12	12	12

Leader and promotion to 2026−27 Kategoria Superiore
Promotion to 2026−27 Kategoria Superiore
Promotion play-off
Relegation play-off
Relegation to 2026–27 Kategoria e Dytë

== Promotion play-offs ==
=== Bracket ===
Semi-finals
Pogradeci	3
Kastrioti	0
Iliria	0
Besa	2

Final
Pogradeci (a.e.t.)	1
Besa	0

=== Semi-finals ===
7 May 2026
16:00

Pogradeci	3−0	Kastrioti
Greca 15'; Pius 89', 90+1'

Gjorgji Kyçyku Stadium, Pogradec
Referee: Ermis Çelaj

7 May 2026
16:00

Iliria	0−2	Besa
		Cordeiro 8'; Chinwendu 11'

Redi Maloku Stadium, Fushë-Krujë
Referee: Olsion Yzeiraj

=== Final ===
11 May 2026
17:00

Pogradeci	1−0 (a.e.t.)	Besa
Índio Oliveira 105'

Elbasan Arena, Elbasan
Referee: Olsion Yzeiraj

Pogradeci qualified to the final play-off match.

== Relegation play-offs ==
9 May 2026
16:00

Luftëtari	1−1 (a.e.t.)	Sopoti
Diamanti 6' (pen.)		Jargavani 79'
Penalties
Ikeocha (penalty missed); Lukão (penalty scored); Anthony (penalty scored); Diamanti (penalty missed)	2−4	(penalty scored) Idris; (penalty scored) Jargavani; (penalty scored) Atanda; (penalty scored) Tabaku

Flamurtari Stadium, Vlorë
Referee: Olsid Ferataj

9 May 2026
16:00

Kukësi	1−1 (a.e.t.)	Bylis B
Ballhysa 68'		Murić 90+3'
Penalties
Gama (penalty scored); Paulo Henrique (penalty scored); Bespallov (penalty scored); Schepanski (penalty scored); Ballhysa (penalty missed)	4−5	(penalty scored) Murić; (penalty scored) Stoilov; (penalty scored) Igor; (penalty scored) Beqaj; (penalty scored) Dimov

Vora Stadium, Vorë
Referee: Kreshnik Barjamaj

Bylis B could not be promoted due to their A team's relegation to Kategoria e Parë. An additional match between Kukësi and the Kategoria e Dytë Group B's play-off final loser, Butrinti, was played to decide the remaining vacant spot.

28 May 2026
15:00

Kukësi	2−0	Butrinti
Matheus Alisson 40'; Abiodoun 46'

Egnatia Arena, Rrogozhinë
Referee: Albert Doda

== Top scorers ==
Rank	Player	Club	Goals
1	(Egypt) Saleh Nasr	Skënderbeu	18
2	(Albania) Olsi Myrta	Laçi	17
3	(Albania) Taulant Marku	Korabi	14
4	(Albania) Dejvid Kapllani	Kastrioti	12
5	(Democratic Republic of the Congo) Kalonji Nyanguila	Luftëtari	11
6	(Nigeria) Freeman Pius	Pogradeci	10

== Notes and references ==
=== Notes ===
1. Besa will play their 2025–26 home games at the Luz i Vogël Stadium in Luz i Vogël, since their venue, Besa Stadium, is undergoing reconstruction.
2. Kastrioti will play their 2025–26 home games at the Redi Maloku Stadium in Fushë-Krujë, since their venue, Kastrioti Stadium, is not suitable for Kategoria e Parë matches.
