= 2019–20 Kategoria Superiore =

Kategoria Superiore
- Season: 2019–20
- Dates: 23 August 2019 – 29 July 2020
- Champions: Tirana; 25th title
- Relegated: Flamurtari; Luftëtari
- Champions League: Tirana
- Europa League: Kukësi; Laçi; Teuta
- Matches: 180
- Goals: 454 (2.52 per match)
- Top goalscorer: Kyrian Nwabueze (23 goals)
- Biggest home win: Partizani 8–1 Luftëtari (14 June 2020)
- Biggest away win: Luftëtari 0–5 Tirana (7 June 2020)
- Highest scoring: Partizani 8–1 Luftëtari (14 June 2020)
- Longest winning run: 7 matches Tirana
- Longest unbeaten run: 14 matches Tirana
- Longest winless run: 21 matches Flamurtari
- Longest losing run: 10 matches Luftëtari
- All statistics correct as of 29 July 2020.

The 2019–20 Kategoria Superiore was the 81st official season, or 84th season of top-tier football in Albania (including three unofficial championships during World War II) and the 20th season under the name Kategoria Superiore. The season began on 23 August 2019 and ended on 29 July 2020. Tirana, won the league title on 19 July 2020 with 2 matches to spare.

The winners of this season's Kategoria Superiore earned a place in the first qualifying round of the 2020-21 Champions League, with the second and third placed clubs earning a place in the first qualifying round of the 2020-21 Europa League. The competition was suspended from 12 March to 3 June 2020, due to a pandemic of COVID-19 in Albania.

== Teams ==
Two clubs earned promotion from the Kategoria e Parë, Bylis and Vllaznia. Kastrioti was relegated to Kategoria e Parë at the conclusion of last season, Kamza was excluded from the championship and relegated to the Kategoria e Dytë, after a violent incident during a match against Laçi in the 24th round.

=== Locations ===
Locations of the 2019–20 Kategoria Superiore teams

Team	Home city	Stadium	Capacity	2018–19 season
Bylis	Ballsh	Adush Muça Stadium	5,200	Champion (Kategoria e Parë)
Flamurtari	Vlorë	Flamurtari Stadium	8,500	5th
Kukësi	Kukës	Various		2nd
Laçi	Laç	Laçi Stadium	2,300	6th
Luftëtari	Gjirokastër	Gjirokastra Stadium	8,400	8th
Partizani	Tirana	Selman Stërmasi Stadium	9,500	Champion
Skënderbeu	Korçë	Skënderbeu Stadium	12,343	4th
Teuta	Durrës	Niko Dovana Stadium	12,040	3rd
Tirana	Tirana	Selman Stërmasi Stadium	9,500	7th
Vllaznia	Shkodër	Loro Boriçi Stadium	16,000	Runner-up (Kategoria e Parë)

- (1) Kukësi will play their 2019–20 home games at various stadiums, due to the reconstruction of the Zeqir Ymeri Stadium in Kukës.
- (2) Partizani will play their 2019–20 home games at the Selman Stërmasi Stadium in Tirana. Their new home ground, Partizani Complex, is currently under construction.

=== Stadiums ===
Bylis	Flamurtari	Kukësi	Laçi	Luftëtari
Adush Muça Stadium	Flamurtari Stadium	Various	Laçi Stadium	Gjirokastra Stadium
Capacity: 5,200	Capacity: 11,200		Capacity: 5,300	Capacity: 8,400
Partizani	Skënderbeu	Teuta	Tirana	Vllaznia
Selman Stërmasi Stadium	Skënderbeu Stadium	Niko Dovana Stadium	Selman Stërmasi Stadium	Loro Boriçi Stadium; UEFA stadium category
Capacity: 9,500	Capacity: 12,343	Capacity: 12,040	Capacity: 9,500	Capacity: 16,000

=== Personnel and kits ===
Note: Flags indicate national team as has been defined under FIFA eligibility rules. Players and Managers may hold more than one non-FIFA nationality.

Team	President	Manager	Captain	Kit manufacturer	Shirt sponsor
Bylis	(Albania) Besnik Kapllanaj	(Serbia) Veljko Dovedan	(Albania) Valentino Murataj	(Germany) Uhlsport	−
Flamurtari	(Albania) Sinan Idrizi	(Brazil) Marcello Troisi	(Albania) Andi Ribaj	(Spain) Joma	−
Kukësi	(Albania) Safet Gjici	(Albania) Orges Shehi	(Kosovo) Besar Musolli	(Italy) Macron	Kevin Construction
Laçi	(Albania) Pashk Laska	(Albania) Armando Cungu	(Serbia) Aleksandar Ignjatović	(Germany) Uhlsport	Pavin Caffe
Luftëtari	(Albania) Bekim Halilaj	(Albania) Neritan Novi	(Albania) Erald Hyseni	(Italy) Macron	Energ Company
Partizani	(Albania) Gazmend Demi	(Albania) Renaldo Kalari	(Albania) Alban Hoxha	(Spain) Joma	MCN
Skënderbeu	(Albania) Ardian Takaj	(Albania) Ilir Daja	(Kosovo) Bajram Jashanica	(Spain) Joma	Fix
Teuta	(Albania) Edmond Hasanbelliu	(Albania) Edi Martini	(Albania) Renato Arapi	(Germany) Uhlsport	Caffè Pascucci
Tirana	(Albania) Refik Halili	(Nigeria) Emmanuel Egbo	(Albania) Erando Karabeci	(Germany) Uhlsport	−
Vllaznia	(Albania) Municipality of Shkodër	(Albania) Hysen Dedja	(Albania) Gilman Lika	(Germany) Uhlsport	−

=== Managerial changes ===
Team	Outgoing manager	Manner of departure	Date of vacancy	Position in table	Incoming manager	Date of appointment
Partizani	(Albania) Skënder Gega	Mutual consent	2 June 2019	Pre-season	(Italy) Franco Lerda	17 June 2019
Skënderbeu	(Albania) Orges Shehi	Resigned	8 June 2019	Pre-season	(Albania) Ilir Daja	8 August 2019
Vllaznia	(Albania) Agim Canaj	Mutual consent	19 July 2019	Pre-season	(North Macedonia) Mirsad Jonuz	19 July 2019
Kukësi	(Albania) Ernest Gjoka	Sacked	19 July 2019	Pre-season	(Albania) Shpëtim Duro	25 July 2019
Flamurtari	(Albania) Gerd Haxhiu	Resigned	14 August 2019	Pre-season	(Albania) Dritan Sadedini	14 August 2019
Luftëtari	(Albania) Klevis Dalipi	Resigned	23 August 2019	Pre-season	(Albania) Klodian Duro	23 August 2019
Luftëtari	(Albania) Klodian Duro	Mutual consent	5 September 2019	10th	(Greece) Georgios Marantas	6 September 2019
Laçi	(Albania) Sulejman Starova	Mutual consent	15 October 2019	8th	(Albania) Armando Cungu	15 October 2019
Flamurtari	(Albania) Dritan Sadedini	Mutual consent	24 October 2019	10th	(Albania) Luan Birçe	24 October 2019
Tirana	(Albania) Ardian Mema	Mutual consent	25 October 2019	6th	(Albania) Julian Ahmataj	25 October 2019
Tirana	(Albania) Julian Ahmataj	Resigned	9 December 2019	8th	(Nigeria) Ndubuisi Egbo	9 December 2019
Luftëtari	(Greece) Georgios Marantas	Sacked	14 December 2019	9th	(Albania) Neritan Novi	14 December 2019
Partizani	(Italy) Franco Lerda	Sacked	14 December 2019	3rd	(Albania) Renaldo Kalari	14 December 2019
Teuta	(Albania) Bledi Shkëmbi	Sacked	14 December 2019	7th	(Albania) Edi Martini	15 December 2019
Luftëtari	(Albania) Neritan Novi	End of caretaker spell	3 January 2020	9th	(Albania) Nikolin Çoçlli	3 January 2020
Partizani	(Albania) Renaldo Kalari	End of caretaker spell	4 January 2020	5th	(Italy) Adolfo Sormani	4 January 2020
Flamurtari	(Albania) Dritan Resuli	End of caretaker spell	25 January 2020	10th	(Brazil) Marcello Troisi	25 January 2020
Luftëtari	(Albania) Nikolin Çoçlli	Resigned	24 February 2020	9th	(Albania) Neritan Novi	24 February 2020
Kukësi	(Albania) Shpëtim Duro	Sacked	29 February 2020	2nd	(Albania) Orges Shehi	2 March 2020
Vllaznia	(North Macedonia) Mirsad Jonuz	End of contract	5 June 2020	8th	(Albania) Hysen Dedja	9 June 2020
Partizani	(Italy) Adolfo Sormani	Mutual consent	13 July 2020	6th	(Albania) Renaldo Kalari	9 June 2020

== League table ==
Pos	Team	Pld	W	D	L	GF	GA	GD	Pts	Qualification or relegation
1	Tirana (C)	36	21	7	8	67	35	+32	70	Qualification for the Champions League first qualifying round
2	Kukësi	36	19	9	8	59	31	+28	66	Qualification for the Europa League first qualifying round
3	Laçi	36	19	7	10	61	34	+27	64	Qualification for the Europa League first qualifying round
4	Skënderbeu	36	17	7	12	42	43	−1	58	
5	Teuta	36	15	12	9	41	34	+7	57	Qualification for the Europa League first qualifying round (Note: Teuta qualified for the Europa League first qualifying round as the 2019–20 Albanian Cup winners.)
6	Partizani	36	15	8	13	51	40	+11	53	
7	Bylis	36	12	15	9	46	38	+8	51	
8	Vllaznia (O)	36	12	10	14	36	41	−5	46	Qualification for the relegation play-off
9	Flamurtari (R)	36	2	9	25	32	72	−40	15	Relegation to the 2020–21 Kategoria e Parë
10	Luftëtari (R)	36	2	8	26	19	86	−67	14	Relegation to the 2020–21 Kategoria e Parë

Source: Albanian Football Association, Soccerway
Rules for classification: 1) Points; 2) Head-to-head points; 3) Head-to-head goal difference; 4) Head-to-head goals scored; 5) Goal difference; 6) Goals scored; 7) Draw.
(C) Champions; (O) Play-off winners; (R) Relegated

== Results ==
Clubs will play each other four times for a total of 36 matches each.

=== First half of season ===
Home \ Away	BYL	FLA	KUK	LAC	LUF	PAR	SKE	TEU	TIR	VLL
Bylis	—	5–0	2–1	1–0	1–0	2–1	2–3	0–0	3–1	0–0
Flamurtari	2–2	—	0–3	3–3	1–1	1–1	1–1	1–3	2–2	1–3
Kukësi	2–1	1–0	—	1–1	4–1	1–0	1–1	4–0	2–1	1–2
Laçi	0–0	3–0	1–0	—	4–0	1–0	1–2	3–0	1–2	3–0
Luftëtari	1–1	2–1	0–0	1–1	—	0–1	2–0	0–0	0–3	0–2
Partizani	1–1	1–0	0–0	1–0	2–0	—	3–1	1–1	1–2	1–0
Skënderbeu	0–3	1–0	0–0	1–4	2–0	3–2	—	1–0	2–1	0–1
Teuta	1–0	1–0	1–0	0–1	3–1	1–0	1–0	—	1–1	0–0
Tirana	2–1	2–0	1–3	2–1	3–0	1–2	3–1	0–0	—	0–0
Vllaznia	0–1	2–0	1–2	1–0	0–0	1–3	4–0	0–0	0–2	—

Source: Albanian Football Federation
Legend: Blue = home team win; Yellow = draw; Red = away team win.

=== Second half of season ===
Home \ Away	BYL	FLA	KUK	LAC	LUF	PAR	SKE	TEU	TIR	VLL
Bylis	—	0–0	1–1	0–3	2–0	1–1	1–0	1–0	1–3	2–2
Flamurtari	2–3	—	1–4	1–3	6–1	1–2	0–1	2–3	0–2	1–3
Kukësi	1–0	4–1	—	3–1	2–1	1–0	0–0	3–0	1–2	0–0
Laçi	2–1	2–1	2–0	—	3–1	1–3	1–0	1–1	3–1	5–2
Luftëtari	1–1	0–1	2–5	0–2	—	0–3	0–1	1–5	0–5	0–1
Partizani	2–2	2–0	1–3	1–0	8–1	—	1–2	0–1	1–1	3–0
Skënderbeu	1–1	1–0	2–1	1–1	2–0	4–1	—	3–2	1–2	2–1
Teuta	1–0	1–1	2–2	2–3	1–1	0–0	1–0	—	1–0	3–1
Tirana	1–1	2–0	1–2	1–0	5–1	5–1	1–1	2–1	—	3–0
Vllaznia	2–2	1–1	1–0	0–0	4–0	1–0	0–1	0–3	0–1	—

Source: Albanian Football Federation
Legend: Blue = home team win; Yellow = draw; Red = away team win.

=== Relegation play-off ===
2 August 2020
19:00

Vllaznia	3−1	Besëlidhja
Kruja 15'; Marku 19'; Lika 78'		Djordjević 33'

Loro Boriçi Stadium, Shkodër
Attendance: 0
Referee: Laver Alla

Both clubs remained in their respective leagues.

== Season statistics ==
=== Scoring ===
==== Top scorers ====
Rank	Player	Club	Goals
1	(Nigeria) Kyrian Nwabueze	Laçi	23
2	(Albania) Vasil Shkurtaj	Kukësi	22
3	(Albania) Sherif Kallaku	Teuta	14
4	(England) Michael Ngoo	Tirana	13
5	(Albania) Redon Xhixha	Laçi	12
6	(Albania) Dejvi Bregu	Skënderbeu	10
6	(Albania) Eraldo Çinari	Partizani	10
6	(Albania) Gilman Lika	Vllaznia	10
6	(Albania) Idriz Batha	Tirana	10
6	(Albania) Kristal Abazaj	Kukësi	10
6	(Mali) Saliou Guindo	Bylis	10

=== Discipline ===
==== Player ====
- Most yellow cards: 14
  - (Albania) Albano Aleksi (Teuta)
- Most red cards: 2
  - (Argentina) Agustín Torassa (Tirana)
  - (North Macedonia) Blagoja Todorovski (Teuta)
  - (Albania) Donald Mëllugja (Bylis)
  - (Albania) Fabian Beqja (Teuta)
  - (Albania) Erion Hoxhallari (Tirana)
  - (Nigeria) Theophilus Solomon (Partizani)
  - (Albania) Valdo Zeqaj (Flamurtari)

== Attendances ==
#	Football club	Average attendance
1	KF Tirana	4,934
2	FK Partizani Tirana	2,591
3	KF Vllaznia Shkodër	2,217
4	KF Skënderbeu Korçë	1,354
5	FK Kukësi	1,200
6	KF Bylis	783
7	KF Teuta	654
8	KF Laçi	625
9	KF Luftëtari	394
10	Flamurtari FC	383

== See also ==
- Kategoria Superiore
