= Avernold Qyrani =

Albanian footballer

Personal information
- Full name: Avernold Qyrani
- Date of birth: 20 April 1998 (age 28)
- Place of birth: Gjirokastër, Albania
- Height: 1.85 m (6 ft 1 in)
- Position: Goalkeeper

Team information
- Current team: Korabi
- Number: 1

Youth career
- 2011–2017: Luftëtari

Senior career*
Years	Team	Apps	(Gls)
2015–2020	Luftëtari	11	(0)
2018	→ Naftëtari (loan)	5	(0)
2018	→ Korabi (loan)	2	(0)
2019	→ Butrinti (loan)		
2021–	Korabi	50	(0)
- * Club domestic league appearances and goals as of 1 June 2024

Avernold Qyrani (born 20 April 1998) is an Albanian professional footballer who plays as a goalkeeper for Albanian club KF Korabi Peshkopi.

== Career statistics ==
=== Club ===
As of 13 May 2020

Club statistics
Club	Season	League			Cup		Europe (Note: Including continental competitions, such as UEFA Champions League and UEFA Europa League)		Other (Note: Including other competitions, such as Albanian Supercup)		Total	
Club	Season	Division	Apps	Goals	Apps	Goals	Apps	Goals	Apps	Goals	Apps	Goals
Luftëtari	2015–16	Albanian First Division	0	0	1	0	—		—		1	0
Luftëtari	2016–17	Albanian Superliga	0	0	0	0	0	0	—		0	0
Luftëtari	2017–18	Albanian Superliga	0	0	0	0	0	0	—		0	0
Luftëtari	2018–19	Albanian Superliga	0	0	0	0	0	0	—		0	0
Luftëtari	2019–20	Albanian Superliga	9	0	2	0	—		—		11	0
Luftëtari	Total		9	0	3	0	0	—	—		12	0
Naftëtari	2017–18	Albanian First Division	5	0	—		—		—		5	0
Korabi	2018–19	Albanian First Division	2	0	2	0	—		—		4	0
Career total			9	0	2	0	—		—		11	0
