= Demiri =

Demiri is a surname. Notable people with the surname include:

- Alajdin Demiri (1954–2019), Albanian politician
- Besir Demiri (born 1994), Albanian footballer
- Elidon Demiri (born 1979), Albanian football coach and former player
- Ertan Demiri (born 1979), Macedonian footballer
- Muhamed Demiri (born)

== See also ==
- Stringos
