= Eridon Qardaku =

Albanian footballer

Personal information
- Date of birth: 10 August 2000 (age 26)
- Place of birth: Laç, Albania
- Height: 1.81 m (5 ft 11 in)
- Position: Attacking midfielder

Team information
- Current team: Dinamo City
- Number: 99

Youth career
- 2011–2014: Shkodra
- 2014–2019: Vllaznia Shkodër

Senior career*
Years	Team	Apps	(Gls)
2019–2023	Bylis Ballsh	113	(22)
2023–2024	Vora	28	(9)
2024–	Dinamo City	43	(3)

International career^{‡}
2019–2021	Albania U21	3	(0)
- * Club domestic league appearances and goals as of 25 June 2026 ‡ National team caps and goals as of 28 April 2023

Eridon Qardaku (born 10 August 2000) is an Albanian professional footballer who plays as an attacking midfielder for Albanian club Dinamo City.

== Honours ==
=== Club ===
Dinamo City

- Albanian Cup: 2024–25

== Career statistics ==
=== Club ===
As of 24 March 2020

Club	Season	League			Cup		Europe		Total	
Club	Season	Division	Apps	Goals	Apps	Goals	Apps	Goals	Apps	Goals
Bylis	2019–20	Albanian Superliga	20	1	3	0	—		23	1
Career total			20	1	3	0	—		23	1
