= AF Luftëtari =

Albanian football club

Luftëtari
- Full name: Akademia e Futbollit Luftëtari
- Nickname: Bluzinjtë
- Founded: 18 December 2020; 5 years ago
- Ground: Gjirokastra Stadium
- Capacity: 8,400
- Owner: Bashkia Gjirokastër
- President: Mustafa Hysi
- Manager: Neritan Novi
- League: Kategoria e Dytë, Group B
- 2025–26: Kategoria e Parë, 9th (relegated)
Home colours

Akademia e Futbollit Luftëtari, commonly known as Luftëtari (Albanian pronunciation: [luftətaɾi]), is a football club based in Gjirokastër. The club plays in the Kategoria e Dytë, which is the third tier of football in the country.

== History ==
After the dissolution of KF Luftëtari due to debts, the Gjirokastra Municipality in December 2020 set in motion to establish a new club as successor of the KF Luftëtari, and at the beginning of February 2021 all the criteria set by the Albanian Football Association for the functioning of the team were met and the name of the team and the logo were revealed which would again stand with the blue and black colours, exactly those characteristic of KF Luftëtari in 91 years of history.

== Players ==
=== Current squad ===
As of 2 February 2024

Note: Flags indicate national team as defined under FIFA eligibility rules; some limited exceptions apply. Players may hold more than one non-FIFA nationality.

| No. | Pos. | Nation | Player |
|---|---|---|---|
| 1 | GK | ALB | Sadik Basha |
| 2 | MF | ALB | Alvi Ahmetaj |
| 3 | DF | BRA | Val Baiano |
| 4 | DF | ALB | Benito Culli |
| 5 | DF | BRA | Glauber |
| 6 | MF | ALB | Andri Celo |
| 7 | FW | ALB | Nazmi Gaba |
| 8 | MF | ALB | Stiven Puci |
| 9 | FW | ALB | Angjelo Radovani |
| 10 | FW | ALB | Ardit Ziaj |
| 12 | GK | BRA | Marcelo |
| 13 | MF | GUI | Issiaga Camara |

| No. | Pos. | Nation | Player |
|---|---|---|---|
| 17 | FW | ALB | Xhuljano Mirani |
| 19 | FW | ALB | Vasili Tuni |
| 20 | MF | ALB | Thoma Puci |
| 21 | FW | ALB | Mario Merkuri |
| 22 | MF | ALB | Xhilardinjo Avduli |
| 33 | GK | GHA | Clement Ashietey Boye |
| 70 | MF | BRA | Hudson |
| 77 | MF | ALB | Astrit Rama |
| — | MF | ALB | Ardit Gaba |
| — | MF | ALB | Resaed Kendella |
| — | FW | BRA | Lucas Mello |

== Honours ==
=== League titles ===
- Kategoria e Tretë

Winners (1): 2021

== List of managers ==
- (Serbia) Marko Jovanović (1 Aug 2020– 11 Dec 2020)
- (Albania) Neritan Novi (14 Dec 2020– 1 Aug 2021)
- (Albania) Petraq Meci (6 Aug 2021– 30 Jun 2022)
- (Albania) Fotis Kristidhi (1 Jul 2022 – 25 Jun 2023)
- (Albania) Edmond Dalipi (1 Jul 2023– 30 Jun 2024)
- (Albania) Besmir Shabani (1 Jul 2024– 10 Nov 2025)
- (Albania) Arber Bisri (11 Nov 2025– 25 Nov 2025)
- (Albania) Bledar Devolli (26 Nov 2025– 7 Apr 2026)
- (Albania) Neritan Novi (8 Apr 2026– )
