= Luftëtari FC =

Luftëtari
- Full name: Luftëtari Football Club
- Nicknames: Bluzinjtë (Blue & Blacks)
- Founded: 15 March 1930; 96 years ago as Shqiponja Gjirokastër
- Dissolved: 29 September 2020
- Ground: Gjirokastra Stadium
- Capacity: 8,400
- Owner(s): Bekim Halilaj (75%); Municipality of Gjirokastër (25%)
- President: Bekim Halilaj
- Manager: Neritan Novi
- 2019–20: Kategoria Superiore, 10th (relegated)
Home colours	Away colours

Luftëtari Football Club (Albanian: Klubi i Futbollit Luftëtari) was an Albanian football club based in Gjirokastër. The club was founded in 1930 as Shqiponja and has played at its home ground, the Gjirokastra Stadium, since 1973. They last competed in the Kategoria Superiore, the first tier of football in the country.

== History ==
=== Early history ===
The club was founded in 1930 under the name Shqiponja Gjirokastër. It underwent many subsequent name changes over the years: Gjirokastër (1949), Puna Gjirokastër (1951), Luftëtari Gjirokastër (1958), Shqiponja Gjirokastër (1992) and to its current name Luftëtari Gjirokastër in 2002.

During the Communist Albania Luftetari was deemed to have a good football academy, which provided for several national team players, such as Theodhori Kalluci, Sefedin Braho, Lefter Millo, Arjan Xhumba, Arjan Bellaj, Altin Haxhi, and Gjergji Kalluci.

Luftëtari finished as the league runner-up in the 1977–78 season, their highest achievement ever.

=== Final years and collapse ===
On 2 July 2015 Mustafa Hysi was appointed as the club's head coach Gentian Nora as general sport director of the 2015–16 Albanian Superliga season, with the aim of achieving promotion back to the Albanian Superliga.

Luftëtari were promoted back to Albanian Superliga after a three-year absence as they defeated Apolonia Fier on the last matchday of the regular season in Group B of the Albanian First Division. They then faced Group A winners Korabi Peshkopi in the championship final at the Qemal Stafa Stadium on 19 May 2016, where they clinched their 8th First Division title as they won 11–10 in a penalty shootout that saw 24 penalties being taken following a goalless draw and extra time. Making a surprise performance in 2016–2017 season Luftetari finished in 4th Position after more than 20 years with Mladen Milinkovic as Head coach and Gentian Nora as General and Sport Director By finishing third in the Albanian Superliga 2017–18 season with Hasan Lika as Head coach and Gentian Nora as Sport Director, they will make its debut in the 2018-19 UEFA Europa League season.Gentian Nora, who served as General and Sport Director, and Hasan Lika, the coach who led Luftëtari to European competition for the first time in its history, both emigrated to the United States in 2019. After their departure, the club underwent several changes in management and coaching staff. In 2021, due to internal conflicts between stakeholders, the club decided not to participate in the Albanian championships anymore.

A new club, AF Luftëtari, was later established in the same city by a group of fans. However, this new entity has no official connection with the historic KF Luftetari A new team was established and named AF Luftëtari which had to start at the third tier of Albanian football.

== Stadium ==
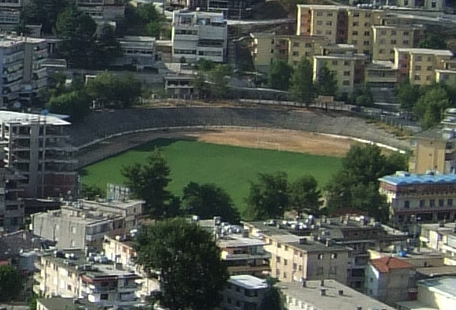
Gjirokastër Stadium

The club plays its home games at the Gjirokastra Stadium, which was built in 1973 and is located near the centre of Gjirokastër and holds 8,400 spectators. Following Luftëtari's promotion back to the Albanian Superliga in 2016, the stadium required a complete renovation in order to meet the necessary requirements to host home games in the top flight. Work on the stadium began in August 2016 and the surface was to be replaced and plastic seats were to be installed throughout the stadium. The first stage of the reconstruction was completed in November 2016, which meant that the stadium was able to host Albanian Superliga games once again. The first stage consisted of replacing the playing surface, the installation of 300 plastic seats in the main stand, the installation of CCTV as well as the refurbishment of the changing room for both players and officials. The cost of the work carried out totalled 15,000,000 Albanian lek, around €110,000 at the time, and it was a joint investment by the Municipality of Gjirokastër, the Albanian Football Association as well as the club's owner Grigor Tavo. The first game of the 2016–17 season to take place at the stadium came against Partizani which ended 1–1 with around 7,000 fans in attendance.

== Honours ==
=== Major trophies ===
League

- Kategoria Superiore
  - Runners-up (1): 1977–78
- Kategoria e Parë (Tier 2)
  - Winners (8): 1934, 1962–63, 1965–66, 1974–75, 1988–89, 1993–94, 1998–99, 2011–12, 2015–16
  - Runners-up (2): 1954, 1960

=== Minor trophies ===
- Zëri i Popullit Cup
  - Winners (1): 1977
- Bashkimi Cup
  - Winners (1): 1983
- Zëri i Rinisë Cup
  - Winners (1): 1982
- Shtypi Popullor Shqiptar Cup
  - Winners (1): 1977
- 50th Anniversary of Football in Albania Cup
  - Winners (1): 1963

== European record ==
As of 12 July 2018

Season	Competition	Round	Club	Home	Away	Agg.
2018–19	UEFA Europa League	1QR	(Latvia) Ventspils	3–3	0−5	3–8

Notes

- QR: Qualifying round

== Current squad ==
As of 17 June 2020

Note: Flags indicate national team as defined under FIFA eligibility rules; some limited exceptions apply. Players may hold more than one non-FIFA nationality.

No.	Pos.	Nation	Player
1	GK	ALB	Avernold Qyrani
2	DF	ALB	Aurel Demo
3	DF	ALB	Enes Isufi
5	DF	ALB	Armenis Kukaj
6	DF	ALB	Donald Açka
7	MF	ALB	Rimal Haxhiu
7	FW	ALB	Serxhio Emini
8	MF	ALB	Erald Hyseni
9	FW	ALB	Joan Çela
11	FW	ALB	Jurgen Dushkaj
15	DF	ALB	Stiven Puci
16	DF	ALB	Klaus Alinani

No.	Pos.	Nation	Player
17	MF	ALB	Alvi Ahmetaj
19	DF	ALB	Franci Lala
21	MF	ALB	Gresild Lika
22	MF	ALB	Klinti Qato
24	GK	ALB	Sadik Basha
27	DF	ALB	Redon Dragoshi
28	DF	ALB	Mikel Brahilika
44	DF	ALB	Amer Duka
45	FW	ALB	Arbër Mehmetllari (on loan from Lokomotiva)
66	MF	ALB	Elian Çelaj
88	GK	ALB	Arlis Shala
99	MF	ALB	Aldrit Oshafi

=== Other players under contract ===
Note: Flags indicate national team as defined under FIFA eligibility rules; some limited exceptions apply. Players may hold more than one non-FIFA nationality.

No.	Pos.	Nation	Player
—	FW	ALB	Rudion Mahmutaj
—	MF	ALB	Kostantinos Kondili
—	DF	ALB	Brunild Naçi
—	DF	ALB	Klevan Kendella

No.	Pos.	Nation	Player
—	FW	ALB	Sebastian Molla
—	GK	ALB	Andrea Shumeli
—	FW	ALB	Dhimiter Andoni
—	MF	ALB	Erind Jahelezi

=== Out on loan ===
Note: Flags indicate national team as defined under FIFA eligibility rules; some limited exceptions apply. Players may hold more than one non-FIFA nationality.

No.	Pos.	Nation	Player
—	DF	ALB	Stivian Janku (Bylis)

== List of managers ==
- (Albania) Adem Karapici
- (Albania) Bahri Ishka
- (Albania) Hito Hitaj (1978–1991)
- (Albania) Dhori Kalluci (1993–1994)
- (Albania) Hito Hitaj (1994–1995)
- (Albania) Mustafa Hysi (1995–1996)
- (Albania) Kristaq Ciko (1997)
- (Albania) Mustafa Hysi (1997–1999)
- (Albania) Faruk Sejdini (1999–2000)
- (Albania) Hysen Dedja (2000)
- (Albania) Mustafa Hysi (2001)
- (Albania) Mihal Çoni (2001)
- (Albania) Ruzhdi Lamaj (2001–2002)
- (Albania) Andrea Marko (2002)
- (Albania) Mihal Çabi (2002–2003)
- (Albania) Andrea Çulli (2002–2003)
- (Albania) Arben Kumbulla (2003–2004)
- (Albania) Mustafa Hysi ( – 30 Aug 2006)
- (Albania) Ilir Spahiu (30 Aug 2006 – 12 Mar 2007)
- (Albania) Mustafa Hysi (12 Mar 2007 – 8 Apr 2007)
- (Albania) Edi Martini (8 Apr 2007 – Jun 2007)
- (Albania) Andrea Çulli (2007 - 2008)
- (Albania) Mustafa Hysi (Jul 2011 – 31 Dec 2011)
- (Albania) Nevil Dede (1 Jan 2012 – 28 Oct 2012)
- (Albania) Edi Martini (28 Oct 2012 - 1 Apr 2013)
- (Albania) Arjan Bellaj (1 Apr 2013 – Oct 2013)
- (Albania) Petraq Bifsha (2013 - 2014)
- (Albania) Bledar Devolli (8 Jul 2014 - 8 Feb 2015)
- (Albania) Vladimir Gjoni (Mar 2015 - May 2015)
- (Albania) Mustafa Hysi (Aug 2015 - 29 Feb 2016)
- (Albania) Gerd Haxhiu (29 Feb 2016 – May 2016)
- (Serbia) Mladen Milinković (Jul 2016 - Jun 2017)
- (Uruguay) Daniel Fernández (Aug 2017 - Oct 2017)
- (Albania) Hasan Lika (Oct 2017 - May 2018)
- (Slovenia) Miloš Kostić (1 Jul 2018 - 19 Sep 2018)
- (Albania) Gentian Mezani (19 Sep 2018 - 28 Jan 2019)
- (Albania) Julian Ahmataj (29 Jan 2019 - 1 June 2019)
- (Albania) Klodian Duro (3 June 2019 - 23 Sep 2019)
- (Greece) Georgios Marantas (24 Sep 2019 - 14 Dec 2019)
- (Albania) Neritan Novi (15 Dec 2019 - 5 Jan 2020)
- (Albania) Nikolin Çoçlli (6 Jan 2020 - 2020)

== Presidents ==
Name	Nationality	Years
Grigor Tavo	(Albania)	1999–2001
Flamur Bime	(Albania)	2003–2004
Flamur Bime	(Albania)	2012–2015
Zamira Rami	(Albania)	2015–2016
Grigor Tavo	(Albania)	2016–2019
Bekim Halilaj	(Albania)	2019-2020
