= Edmond Dalipi =

Albanian footballer

Personal information
- Date of birth: 3 March 1972 (age 54)
- Place of birth: Lushnjë, PR Albania
- Position: Striker

Team information
- Current team: AS Luftëtari (manager)

Senior career*
Years	Team	Apps	(Gls)
1988–1991	Lushnja	37	(3)
1991–1996	Dinamo Tirana	106	(22)
1996–1997	Lushnja	12	(3)
1997	Partizani	4	(0)
1998	Dinamo Tirana	32	(8)
1999	Apollon Smyrnis	22	(2)
2000	Trikala	13	(0)
2001	Bylis	25	(7)
2001–2002	Vllaznia	21	(3)
2002–2003	Dinamo Tirana	21	(3)
2004	Lushnja		
2004	Dinamo Tirana		
2004–2005	Laçi	5	(0)
2007–2008	Skrapari		(6)

International career
1993–2000	Albania	16	(1)

Managerial career
- 2011: Skrapari
- 2012: Tërbuni
- 2013: Dinamo Tirana
- 2013: Adriatiku
- 2015: Sopoti
- 2020–2021: Tërbuni
- 2021–2022: Luzi United
- 2023–: Luftëtari
- * Club domestic league appearances and goals

Edmond Dalipi (born 03 March 1972) is an Albanian football coach and a former player who is the manager of Luftëtari. He played for Dinamo Tirana, KS Lushnja, Partizani Tirana, Bylis Ballsh, Vllaznia Shkodër and KF Laçi in Albania as well as Greek sides Apollon Smyrnis and Trikala.

== International career ==
Dalipi made 16 appearances for the Albania national football team from 1993 to 2000.
