= Elian Çelaj =

Albanian footballer

Personal information
- Date of birth: 3 February 1999 (age 27)
- Place of birth: Tirana, Albania
- Height: 1.73 m (5 ft 8 in)
- Position: Midfielder

Youth career
- –2016: Internacional Tirana
- 2016–2017: Akademia e Futbollit
- 2017: Internacional Tirana
- 2017–2018: Partizani Tirana

Senior career*
Years	Team	Apps	(Gls)
2018–2019	Luftëtari	9	(0)
2019–2020	Flamurtari	7	(0)
2020	Luftëtari	13	(0)
2020–2021	Kukësi	0	(0)
2023–2024	Erzeni	1	(0)
2024–2025	Trepça	12	(1)

International career
2016	Albania U19	1	(0)
- * Club domestic league appearances and goals as of 20 April 2025

Elian Çelaj (born 3 February 1999) is an Albanian footballer who last played as a midfielder for Trepça.

== Career ==
=== KF Luftëtari ===
Çelaj began his professional career with Luftëtari, joining the club in August 2018 after leaving the Partizani Tirana academy. He made his competitive debut for the club on 12 September 2018 in a 4–0 victory over Vora in the Albanian Football Cup. In his first season, Çelaj made just nine league appearances, eight of which were off the bench, tallying 223 total minutes. With Luftëtari struggling financially following the 2018–19 season, Çelaj dissolved his contract with the club.

=== Trepça ===
On September 6, 2024, he signed for the Kosovan club Trepça. On March 2, 2025, Çelaj scored his first goal against Rilindja 1974.
