= Andrea Marko (footballer) =

Albanian footballer and manager

Personal information
- Date of birth: 3 November 1956 (age 69)
- Place of birth: Tirana, Albania
- Position: Midfielder

Youth career
- 1972-1975: Dinamo Tirana

Senior career*
Years	Team	Apps	(Gls)
1975–1987	Dinamo Tirana		(90)

International career
1976–1978	Albania U21	6	(0)
1980–1985	Albania	5	(0)

Managerial career
- 2002: Luftëtari
- 2002: Bylis
- 2003: Dinamo Tirana
- 2003-2004: Pogradeci
- 2006: Albpetrol
- 2007: Apolonia Fier
- 2010: Skënderbeu
- 2012: Kastrioti
- * Club domestic league appearances and goals

Andrea Marko (born 3 November 1956) is an Albanian retired footballer and football manager.

== Playing career ==
=== Club ===
Marko played his entire career for hometown club Dinamo Tirana as a midfielder.

=== International ===
He made his debut for Albania in a September 1980 FIFA World Cup qualification match against Finland in Tirana and earned a total of 5 caps, scoring no goals. His final international was a May 1985 FIFA World Cup qualification match against Poland.

== Managerial career ==
In April 2012, he was named manager of Kastrioti Krujë

== Personal life ==
His family was one of the rich families from Dhërmi and his grandfather was killed by the communists in 1944. In 1986 Marko was arrested for alleged gambling and perhaps as being member of that family. He also is the cousin of former Albania international goalkeeper Foto Strakosha.

== Honours ==
- Albanian Superliga: 2

1977, 1980

- Albanian Cup: 2

1978, 1982
