= Georgios Marantas =

Greek footballer

Personal information
- Date of birth: 5 August 1973 (age 53)
- Place of birth: Mangana, Greece

Managerial career
- Years: Team
- 2008: Odysseas Anagennisi
- 2008–2009: Lamia
- 2009: Makedonikos
- 2010: Panachaiki
- 2010–2011: Megas Alexandros Irakleia
- 2012–2013: Kavala
- 2013–2014: Kavala
- 2014: Fokikos
- 2014–2015: Panelefsiniakos
- 2015: Panegialios
- 2015–2016: Trikala
- 2017: Acharnaikos
- 2018–2019: Aris Avato
- 2019: KF Luftëtari

Georgios Marantas (Greek: Γεώργιος Μαραντάς; born 5 August 1973) is a Greek football manager.
