= Hudson (footballer, born 1996) =

Brazilian footballer

Personal information
- Full name: Hudson Felipe Gonçalves
- Date of birth: 24 January 1996 (age 30)
- Place of birth: Rio de Janeiro, Brazil
- Height: 1.80 m (5 ft 11 in)
- Position: Midfielder

Team information
- Current team: Luftëtari
- Number: 70

Youth career
- 2009: Vasco da Gama
- 2009–2010: Olaria
- 2011–2015: Fluminense
- 2016: Cruzeiro

Senior career*
Years	Team	Apps	(Gls)
2017–2018	Santa Cruz de Natal	1	(0)
2017	→ Portimonense (loan)	1	(0)
2018	Jelgava		
2018	JK Järve	6	(2)
2019	CRB	1	(0)
2019	Mamoré		
2020	ASSU	5	(0)
2020	Athletic		
2021–2022	Ovarense		
2022	Fiães		
2023	Valonguense		
2023–2024	Vista Alegre		
2024–	Luftëtari		
- * Club domestic league appearances and goals as of 16 February 2020

Hudson Felipe Gonçalves, known as Hudson (born 24 January 1996) is a Brazilian football player who plays for Albanian club Luftëtari.

== Club career ==
He made his professional debut in the Segunda Liga for Portimonense on 22 February 2017 in a game against Sporting Covilhã.
