= Baton Zabërgja =

Kosovan footballer

Personal information
- Date of birth: 18 April 2001 (age 25)
- Place of birth: Vushtrri, Kosovo under UN administration
- Height: 1.85 m (6 ft 1 in)
- Position: Winger

Team information
- Current team: Kharkiv
- Number: 7

Youth career
- 2010–2015: Vushtrria
- 2015–2017: Australia
- 2017–2018: El Clasico Football School
- 2018–2019: IK Tord
- 2019–2020: Vushtrria

Senior career*
Years	Team	Apps	(Gls)
2020	Vushtrria	11	(1)
2020–2022	Drenica	57	(8)
2022–2023	Gjilani	33	(5)
2023–2025	Dinamo City	69	(17)
2025–	Kharkiv	31	(10)

International career^{‡}
2021–2022	Kosovo U21	6	(0)
2025–	Kosovo	11	(0)
- * Club domestic league appearances and goals as of 21 October 2026 ‡ National team caps and goals as of 16:16, 18 November 2026 (UTC)

Baton Zabërgja (born 18 April 2001) is a Kosovan professional footballer who plays as a winger for Ukrainian Premier League club Kharkiv and the Kosovo national team.

== Club career ==
=== Early career ===
Zabërgja was part of several youth clubs like Vushtrria, Australia, El Clasico Football School, IK Tord and again in Vushtrria. In the second half of the 2019–20 season, he was promoted to the Vushtrria's senior team who competed in the Kosovo Superleague. On 15 February 2020, he made his debut in a 0–4 away defeat against Prishtina after being named in the starting line-up. In the final matchweek of the league, Zabërgja scored his first professional goal in his eleventh appearance for the club in a 5–3 home draw against Llapi. On 20 August 2020, Zabërgja joined Kosovo Superleague side Drenica.

=== Gjilani ===
On 24 June 2022, Zabërgja signed a two-year contract with Kosovo Superleague club Gjilani. His debut with Gjilani came thirteen days later in the 2022–23 UEFA Europa Conference League first qualifying round against Liepāja after being named in the starting line-up.

=== Dinamo City ===
On 31 July 2023, Zabërgja joined Kategoria Superiore side Dinamo City. His debut with Dinamo City came on 27 August against Tirana after being named in the starting line-up. On 17 September 2023, Zabërgja scored his first goal in his fourth appearance for the club in a 1–2 away defeat against Erzeni Shijak.

== International career ==
=== Under-21 ===
On 15 March 2021, Zabërgja received a call-up from Kosovo U21 for the friendly matches against Qatar U23. Eleven days later, he made his debut with Kosovo U21 in first match against Qatar U23 after coming on as a substitute at 87th minute in place of Rilind Nivokazi.

=== Senior ===
On 9 November 2024, Zabërgja received a call-up from Kosovo for the 2024–25 UEFA Nations League matches against Romania and Lithuania. His debut with Kosovo came on 6 June 2025 in a friendly match against Armenia after being named in the starting line-up.

== Career statistics ==
=== International ===
As of match played 17 November 2026

Appearances and goals by national team and year
National team	Year	Apps	Goals
Kosovo
Kosovo	2025	3	0
Kosovo	2026	8	0
Total		11	0

== Honours ==
Dinamo City

- Albanian Cup: 2024–25
