= FK Apolonia =

Albanian football club

Apolonia
- Full name: Futboll Klub Apolonia
- Founded: 17 June 1925; 101 years ago Apollonia (1925–27) Myzeqeja (1927–30) SK Fieri (1930–36) Apollonia (1936–49) Fieri (1949–50) Puna Fier (1951–57) Apollonia (1958–82) Apolonia (1982–present)
- Ground: Loni Papuçiu Stadium
- Capacity: 3,159
- Owner: Koço Kokëdhima
- Manager: Santiliano Dule
- League: Kategoria e Dytë, Group B
- 2025–26: Kategoria e Parë, 11th (relegated)
Home colours	Away colours	Third colours

Futboll Klub Apolonia is an Albanian football club based in Fier. The club was founded on 17 June 1925 and took its name from the nearby ruins of the ancient city of Apollonia. The club currently competes in Kategoria e Dytë, the third tier of Albanian football. Their home ground is the Loni Papuçiu Stadium.

== History ==
=== Early years ===
During the early 1920s, sports activities began being organised in the city of Fier, much like other cities in Albania at the time. Students from the region returning from their studies in larger Albanian cities and abroad had learned about football, which they then played back in Fier, which soon became so popular that almost every neighbourhood in the city had children and adults alike playing football. The first official football game to be held in Fier was organised by the Bashkimi Culturual Society on 17 July 1924, which was played between a selection of players from Fier and neighbouring city Vlorë. The following summer in 1925, a group of local students led by Namik Resuli founded the Shoqeria Sportive Apollonia, which translates in English to the Apollonia Sports Society, taking the name from the nearby ruins of the ancient Illyrian city of Apollonia. The club was a multidisciplinary one, ad featured one of the first official football clubs in Fier. In 1927 the club's name was changed to SK Myzeqeja and the following year in 1928 the club became a fully professional one, and along with this re-organised its structure by adding the club's regulations and the board of directors, who would plan every activity and match held by the club.

=== 1930–1945 ===
In 1930, the Albanian Football Association was established and the first officially recognised competitions were held in the country. The club had entered to compete in a national competition for the first time, and were placed in the inaugural second tier championship along with Shqiponja Gjirokastër, SK Lushnja, Bardhyli Lezhë and Muzaka Berat. Before the championship had begun, the club had renamed itself to SK Fier, thus dropping the Apollonia from the name. Muzaka Berat won the first second tier championship and they achieved promotion to the old First Division, with SK Fier, Shqiponja Gjirokastër, Bardhyli Lezhë and SK Lushnja missing out on promotion. There was no Second Division held the following year in 1931, but the competition returned in 1932 and was played in three groups between April and May. SK Fier competed in Group B along with Erzeni Shijak, SK Kavajë, Kongresi i Lushnjës and Muzaka Berat, where SK Kavajë finished top of the group and progressed to the final stage against SK Vlorë, who they beat to win the competition. For the following two seasons SK Fier competed in Group B of the Second Division to no avail as they failed to the reach the final stage of the competition. There were no footballing activities held in 1935, but with their return in 1936, SK Fier did not compete in the Second Division initially. However, due to the financial problems of the original finalist Leka i Madh Përmet the club was invited by the Albanian Football Association to compete in a rematch tournament, where SK Fier finished in third and last place with 3 points, behind Kongresi i Lushnjës who also had 3 points and the winners and the promoted side Tomori Berat with 5 points. Between 1937 and 1939 there was no Second Division held, and shortly after World War II broke out which meant that many clubs including SK Fier ceased sporting activities until 1945.

=== 1945–1949 ===
Following the return of football activities, the club changed its name back to Apollonia Fier and began functioning in 1945 and entered to compete in the top flight for the first time, participating in the 1945 Albanian Championship, where they were placed in Group B. The club finished sixth out of seven teams in the group, with 2 wins, 1 draw and 6 losses, earning them a total of 7 points and a goal difference of −19 as they conceded 28 goals and only scored 9 in total. They were eventually relegated and as there was no Second Division held at the time the club was reduced to playing friendly games, before successfully joining the 1948 Albanian Championship, again in Group B. Their second top flight season proved to be far more successful as they finished in third place out of eight sides, with 7 wins, 5 draws and 2 losses and a total of 19 points, just one point behind group winners Flamurtari Vlorë. However, due to changes in the format of footballing competitions by the Albanian Football Association, in order to employ a western format, the club was unable to play in the 1948–49 Albanian Championship as they were placed in the new eight-team Second Division, where they were ranked second behind Partizani Tirana B before the competition was annulled under Soviet pressure who ordered the reinstatement of the Soviet format.

=== 1990–present ===
After the fall of communism just like in every club in Albania, many players left to continue their career abroad. In 1992, the football branch was separated from the main club and continued as KF Apolonia Fier under chairman Koço Kokëdhima. The club started its revival in 1997 after making some impressive appearances to end in the fifth place. The next season the club would finish in a disappointing seventh place but they managed to reach for the first and only time in their history the final of the Albanian Cup. The club would face in the final their arch-rivals KS Lushnja. Apolonia managed to win the game with 1–0 and bring home the only cup. From 2001 onwards, the club took the name "FK Apolonia". After some good years in the Albanian Superliga, the club got relegated in 2002–03. Apolonia stayed in the Second Division until their promotion in 2005–06 when they finished as runners-up. Romanian Silviu Dumitrescu, who has a lot of experience, was the new coach for the 2006–07 season. On 10 October 2006, Dumitrescu resigned and was replaced by Dhimitër Papuçiu. Even though he started with some good results the club could not manage to leave the last place of the table. Papuçiu was replaced by Andrea Marko at the start of 2007. But their Superliga season would be difficult and they would finish bottom of the table. In the next season after a hard-fought championship they managed to get promoted back to the Superliga. This season under manager Esad Karishik they have managed to establish themselves in the middle of the table.

== Stadium ==
=== New stadium ===
The president of the Albanian Football Association, Armand Duka announced on a visit to Fier on 23 November 2010 that plans are under way to build a new stadium that will be shared by both Apolonia Fier and Flamurtari Vlorë. The stadium will seat between 15,000 and 20,000 people, making it the second biggest stadium in Albania behind the new under construction Qemal Stafa Stadium. The stadium will be located between the two neighbouring cities near the 'Vlorë Fier Bridge' and is due to be completed by 2013. The shareholders that have taken responsibility in building the new stadium are the Vlorë Council, Fier Council, Apolonia Fier, Flamurtari Vlorë and the Albanian Football Association, who have all promised to invest 20% of the costs each.

=== Loni Papuçiu Stadium ===
The club's existing stadium Loni Papuçiu Stadium reconstructed in 2013, and was completed 7 months later in February 2014 in time for a home fixture against Ada Velipojë on 15 February 2014. The reconstruction of the stadium involved the installation of floodlights for the first time, a brand new field and 4,000 plastic seating all around the stadium.

== Rivalries ==
Apollonia's biggest rivals are KS Lushnja and the match between the two clubs is referred as "The Myzeqe Derby". The rivalry between the two clubs became more tense when in 1998 the two clus faced each other in the final of the Albanian Cup. Other rivals include Flamurtari, KF Çlirimi second team of Fieri and KS Bylis Ballsh.

== Colours and badge ==
The club's name comes from the nearby ancient city of Apollonia. In the badge are shown the antic ruins of the city in a red background. The club's traditional colours are white and green and this is the reason why they are usually referred to as "Bardhegjelberit" (English:"White and Green").

== Honours ==
- Kategoria e Parë
  - Winners (5): 1966–67, 1971–72, 1978–79, 1984–85, 2019–20
- Albanian Cup
  - Winners (1): 1997–98
- Albanian Supercup
  - Runners-up (1): 1998
- Gazeta Bashkimi Cup
  - Winners (2): 1985, 1988

== FK Apolonia in Europe ==
As of December 2008

Season	Competition	Round	Country	Club	Home	Away	Aggregate
1989–90	UEFA Cup	1R	(France)	AJ Auxerre	0–3	0–5	0–8
1998–99	UEFA Cup Winners' Cup	QR	(Belgium)	KRC Genk	1–5	0–4	1–9

- QR = Qualifying Round
- 1R = 1st Round

== Current squad ==
As of 1 March 2024

Note: Flags indicate national team as defined under FIFA eligibility rules; some limited exceptions apply. Players may hold more than one non-FIFA nationality.

No.	Pos.	Nation	Player
1	GK	ALB	Henri Bega
2	MF	ALB	Enea Topi
3	DF	ALB	Klark Kalus
4	DF	ALB	Ersildio Asllanaj
5	MF	KEN	Umar Yasin
6	MF	ALB	Mateo Shanaj
7	FW	ALB	Xhovalin Trifoni
8	MF	ALB	Rubin Hebeja
11	MF	ALB	Mikael Rakipaj
13	DF	ALB	Serjan Repaj
15	MF	ALB	Abjel Bejzade

No.	Pos.	Nation	Player
16	DF	NGR	Ndubuisi Francis Eneh
17	MF	ALB	Fabricio Culli
18	MF	ALB	Stefano Omeri
21	MF	NGR	Nurudeen Orelesi
22	FW	CMR	Calice Nwatsock A Ekoro
55	GK	ALB	Romeo Harizaj
76	FW	ALB	Erald Maksuti
96	GK	ALB	Aldo Bushi
99	FW	NGR	Mmesoma Umejiego
—	MF	KEN	Kevin Owino Odongo
—	FW	KEN	Lewis Shivachi

== List of managers ==
- (Albania) Bahri Ishka
- (Albania) Rexhep Spahiu
- (Albania) Vasif Biçaku (1966–1967)*
- (Albania) Zihni Gjinali (1971–1973)*
- (Albania) Mersin Gjoka (1973–1975)
- (Albania) Kozma Mone (1978–1980)
- (Albania) Vangjel Capo (1980–1982)
- (Albania) Vangjel Capo (1983–1992)
- (Albania) Sotiraq Tegu (1993–1995)
- (Albania) Thanas Tupe (1995–1996)
- (Albania) Miço Papuçiu (1996 – 10 February 1997)
- (Albania) Feim Breca (10 February 1997 – 1998)*
- (Albania) Dhimitër Papuçiu (1998–1999)
- (Albania) Vangjel Capo (1999–2000)
- (Albania) Iljaz Haxhiaj (2000)
- (Albania) Shpëtim Duro (2000–2001)
- (Albania) Dhimitër Papuçiu (2001)
- (Albania) Edmond Liçaj (2002)
- (Albania) Vangjel Capo (2002)
- (Albania) Faruk Sejdini (2003)
- (Romania) Silviu Dumitrescu (Jul 2006 – Oct 2006)
- (Albania) Dhimitër Papuçiu (Oct 2006 – Jan 2007)
- (Albania) Andrea Marko (Jan 2007 – Jun 2007)
- (Albania) Gerd Haxhiu (Jul 2007 – Nov 2008)
- (Serbia) Esad Karišik (Nov 2008 – Nov 2009)
- (Albania) Hasan Lika (Nov 2009 – May 2010)
- (Albania) Ernest Gjoka (3 Jul 2010 – 14 Feb 2011)
- (Albania) Eqerem Memushi (23 Feb 2011 – 28 Jul 2011)
- (Albania) Stavri Nica (31 Jul 2011 – 13 Mar 2012)
- (Albania) Dhimitër Papuçiu (13 Mar 2012 – 30 Jun 2012)
- (Albania) Ernest Gjoka (1 July 2012 – 31 Oct 2012)
- (Albania) Elidon Demiri (1 Nov 2012 – 1 Dec 2014)
- (Albania) Marjol Miho (1 Dec 2014 – 3 Jan 2015)
- (Albania) Artan Mërgjyshi (3 Jan 2015 - Jun 2016)
- (Albania) Elidon Demiri (Aug 2016 – May 2017)
- (Albania) Ndriçim Kashami (Aug 2017 - Apr 2018)
- (Albania) Mariglen Kule (Apr 2018 - May 2018 )
- (Albania) Marjol Miho (1 Jul 2018 - 15 Dec 2018)
- (Albania) Mariglen Kule (16 Dec 2018 - Dec 2018)
- (Albania) Gentian Stojku (Mar 2019 - May 2019)
- (Albania) Artan Mërgjyshi (Jul 2019 - 31 Aug 2020)
- (Italy) Giovanni Colella (1 Sep 2020 - 30 Nov 2020)
- (Albania) Nikolin Çoçlli (1 Dec 2020 - 17 Dec 2020)
- (Albania) Bledar Borova (18 Dec 2020 - 2 Jan 2021)
- (Italy) Fabrizio Cammarata (2 Jan 2021 - 30 Jun 2021)
- (Italy) Manuele Blasi (1 Jul 2021 - 15 Aug 2021)
- (Italy) Juriy Cannarsa (19 Jul 2021 - 1 June 2022)
- (Albania) Klevis Dalipi (1 Jul 2022 - 22 Sep 2022)
- (Albania) Mariglen Kule (23 Sep 2022 - 30 Nov 2022)
- (Bosnia and Herzegovina) Veljko Dovedan (1 Dec 2022 - 3 Jan 2023)
- (Albania) Besmir Shabani (3 Jan 2023 - 5 Jan 2023)
- (Bosnia and Herzegovina) Veljko Dovedan (6 Jan 2023 - 24 May 2023)
- (Spain) Yeray Rodríguez (20 Jun 2023 - ,29 Dec 2023)
- (Albania) Artan Mërgjyshi (14 Jan 2024 - 22 Sep 2024)
- (Albania) Nikolin Çoçlli (23 Sep 2024 -28 Sep 2024)
- (Serbia) Sadat Pajaziti (29 Sep 2024 -18 Mar 2025)
- (Albania) Rudin Nako (19 Mar 2025 -29 Mar 2025)
- (Argentina) Matias Tatangelo (29 Mar 2025 - 26 May 2025)
- (Serbia) Marko Jovanović (7 Jul 2025 - 7 May 2026)
- (India) Noor Alam (22 May 2026 - 1 Oct 2026)
- (Albania) Marenglen Meta (2 Oct 2026 - 19 Oct 2026)
- (Albania) Santiliano Dule (20 Oct 2026 -)
