= Franc Ymeralilaj =

Albanian footballer

Personal information
- Date of birth: 14 January 1995 (age 31)
- Place of birth: Ballsh, Albania
- Height: 1.79 m (5 ft 10 in)
- Position: Right-back

Team information
- Current team: Diagoras
- Number: 7

Youth career
- Diagoras

Senior career*
| Years | Team | Apps | (Gls) |
| 2012–2015 | Diagoras | 0 | (0) |
| 2018 | AS Rodos | | |
| 2019–2021 | Bylis | 44 | (0) |
| 2021–2022 | Egnatia | 34 | (0) |
| 2022–2023 | Chania | 15 | (0) |
| 2023–2024 | Ionikos | 13 | (0) |
| 2024–2025 | Rodos | 0 | (0) |
| 2025– | Diagoras | 9 | (2) |

International career
| 2011–2012 | Albania U17 | 8 | (2) |
| 2013 | Albania U19 | 1 | (0) |
- * Club domestic league appearances and goals as of 1 August 2024

Franc Ymeralilaj (born 14 January 1995) is an Albanian professional footballer who plays as a right-back for Gamma Ethniki club Diagoras.
