= Elidon Demiri =

Albanian footballer and coach

Personal information
- Full name: Elidon Demiri
- Date of birth: 13 May 1979 (age 47)
- Place of birth: Fier, Albania
- Position: Defender

Senior career*
Years	Team	Apps	(Gls)
1997–2001	Apolonia	52	(1)
1997–2001	Bylis	21	(0)
1997–2001	Apolonia	20	(1)
2001–2003	Teuta	22	(2)
2003–2004	Besa		
2004–2005	Skënderbeu		
2006–2007	Apolonia	6	(0)
2007–2008	Skënderbeu	14	(0)
2008–2009	Vlora		
2009–2010	Bilisht Sport		

Managerial career
- 2011–2012: Bylis (assistant)
- 2012–2014: Apolonia
- 2016–2017: Apolonia
- * Club domestic league appearances and goals

Elidon Demiri (born 13 May 1979 in Fier) is an Albanian football coach and former player, who most recently was manager of Apolonia Fier in the Albanian Superliga.

== Managerial career ==
He succeeded Ernest Gjoka as manager of Apolonia in November 2012.
