= Ibrahim Mustapha =

Ibrahim Mustapha may refer to:

- Ibrahim Mustapha (Nigerian footballer) (born 1996)
- Ibrahim Mustapha (Ghanaian footballer) (born 2000)
