= Glauber (footballer, born 1996) =

Brazilian footballer

Personal information
- Full name: Glauber Gomes dos Santos
- Date of birth: 25 June 1996 (age 30)
- Place of birth: Brasília, Brazil
- Position: Defender

Team information
- Current team: Luftëtari
- Number: 5

Senior career*
Years	Team	Apps	(Gls)
2021–2022	Butrinti	27	(1)
2022–	Luftëtari		
- * Club domestic league appearances and goals as of 7 May 2022

Glauber Gomes dos Santos (born 25 June 1996), commonly known as Glauber, is a Brazilian professional footballer who plays as a defender for Albanian side Luftëtari.

== Career statistics ==
=== Club ===
As of 2 February 2022.

Appearances and goals by club, season and competition
Club	Season	League			Cup		Other		Total	
Club	Season	Division	Apps	Goals	Apps	Goals	Apps	Goals	Apps	Goals
Butrinti	2021–22	Kategoria e Parë	15	1	1 (Note: Appearances in the Albanian Cup)	0	0	0	16	1
Career total			15	1	1	0	0	0	16	1
