= Naci Şensoy =

Kosovar-Turkish footballer and manager

Personal information
- Date of birth: 20 February 1958 (age 68)
- Place of birth: Prizren, FPR Yugoslavia (present-day Kosovo)
- Position: Midfielder

Senior career*
| Years | Team | Apps | (Gls) |
| 1988–1991 | Manisaspor | 50 | (0) |
| 1991–1992 | Vanspor | 31 | (1) |
| 1992–1993 | Tarisspor | 5 | (0) |

Managerial career
- 2000–2001: Istanbulspor (assistant)
- 2001–2002: Alibeyköy
- 2002–2003: Turan Tovuz
- 2003–2004: Slavia Sofia (assistant)
- 2004–2005: Turan Tovuz
- 2006–2007: Belasitsa Petrich
- 2007–2008: Pirin Blagoevgrad
- 2008–2009: Vihren Sandanski
- 2010–2011: Lokomotiv Plovdiv
- 2011: BSK Borča
- 2011–2012: Bylis
- 2012: Turan
- 2012–2013: Bylis Ballsh
- 2013–2014: Kukësi
- 2014–2015: Gençlerbirliği (assistant)
- 2015–2016: Pirin Blagoevgrad
- 2016–2017: Pelister
- 2019–2020: Makedonija G.P.
- 2023: Bylis
- 2023–2024: Vihren Sandanski
- 2025–2026: Laçi
- * Club domestic league appearances and goals

Naci Şensoy (Albanian: Naxhi Shensoj; born 20 February 1958) is a Kosovar football manager and former player.

== Playing career ==
Born to Albanian parents in Prizren, Yugoslavia (modern Kosovo), he moved to Turkey where he began his footballing career, playing for Manisaspor and Vanspor.

== Coaching career ==
Following his playing career, he began his coaching career in Turkey, becoming assistant manager in Istanbulspor. Afterwards, he managed a couple of lower league Turkish clubs, before taking over Azerbaijani Turan Tovuz. He managed a number of Bulgarian clubs, being Lokomotiv Plovdiv the last in the succession. On July 2, 2011, he took charge of Serbian SuperLiga club BSK Borča, however after only a month, he left even before the season had started. Şensoy took over as head coach of Pirin Blagoevgrad in October 2015, being credited with improving the fortunes for the team that was firmly rooted to the bottom of the Bulgarian First League standings at the time of his appointment. Under Şensoy's management, Pirin managed to avoid relegation at the end of the season.

== Honours ==
Pelister

- Macedonian Football Cup: 2016–17

Laçi

- Kategoria e Parë:2025–26
