= Bekim Halilaj =

Albanian businessman

- Born: Bekim Halilaj; Albania
- Occupations: Businessman; President of Luftëtari FC
- Status: Pardoned
- Conviction: Fraud
- Penalty: 5 years imprisonment

Bekim Halilaj is an Albanian businessman who is the majority shareholder and president of Albanian football club Luftëtari.

== Early life ==
Halilaj was convicted of fraud in Albania in 1996 and was sentenced to five years in prison, but he did not serve any prison time as he moved to Greece shortly after the conviction. He settled in Thessaloniki where he lived for over a decade before his sentence was pardoned and he was able to return to Albania.
