= Shpëtim Duro =

Albanian football manager (born 1959)

Personal information
- Full name: Shpëtim Duro
- Date of birth: 24 December 1959 (age 66)
- Place of birth: Tirana, PR Albania

Managerial career
- Years: Team
- 1999–2000: Bylis
- 2000: Dinamo Tirana
- 2000–2001: Apolonia
- 2001–2002: Partizani
- 2006–2007: Albania (assistant)
- 2008–2009: Partizani
- 2009–2010: Besa Kavajë
- 2011: Skënderbeu
- 2012: Vllaznia
- 2013: Partizani
- 2013–2014: Shkëndija
- 2014–2015: Partizani
- 2015: Shkëndija
- 2017–2018: Flamurtari
- 2018–2019: Drita
- 2019–2020: Kukësi
- 2020–2021: Laçi
- 2022: Laçi
- 2022–2023: Egnatia
- 2023–2024: Struga Trim-Lum
- 2024: Suhareka
- 2025: Besa Kavajë

Shpëtim Duro (born 24 December 1959) is an Albanian professional football coach.

== Managerial career ==
Duro won his first major title as coach of KF Besa Kavajë when his team beat KF Vllaznia in the 2010 Albanian Cup final.

He won the 2010–11 Kategoria Superiore as manager of KF Skënderbeu Korçë. It was the first league title of Skënderbeu since 1933.

He was named the manager of Macedonian First League side FK Shkëndija on 24 November 2013, just 15 hours after the sacking of Gjore Jovanovski. He was first hired as a temporary caretaker manager for the club's next three games, but he signed a contract with the club to be the manager for the remainder of the 2013–14 season.

On 27 May 2014, he officially rejoined Partizani on a three-year contract.

He replaced Bekim Isufi as manager of Kosovan side Drita in September 2018 and on 25 July 2019, Duro was announced as head coach of Kukësi.

He won the 2022–23 Macedonian First Football League as manager of FC Struga, the first ever national championship for the club. In the following season, he was sacked three games before the end of the season, which finished with a new league title for Struga.

In July 2024 he was appointed manager of FC Suhareka, recently promoted to the Football Superleague of Kosovo. His contract was terminated by mutual agreement on 18 October 2024. He recorded four wins, one draw and two defeats in his seven games in charge.
