= Arlind Rustemi =

Albanian footballer

Personal information
- Full name: Arlind Rustemi
- Date of birth: 7 February 1986 (age 40)
- Place of birth: Vlorë, Albania
- Position: Forward

Senior career*
Years	Team	Apps	(Gls)
2006?–2009	Flamurtari	35	(4)
2009–2010	Gramozi	20	(1)
2010–2011	Vlora		
2011–2012	Rabat Ajax	9	(3)
2012–2013	Himara	6	(0)

International career
2004–2005	Albania U-19	5	(2)
- * Club domestic league appearances and goals as of 17 October 2011

Arlind Rustemi (born 7 February 1986 in Vlorë) is an Albanian footballer who plays as a forward.

== Club career ==
As of the 2010–11 season he played for KF Vlora in the Albanian First Division. In October 2011 he moved to Maltese side Rabat Ajax, and scored on his debut. Later he played for Himara.

He previously played for KS Gramozi Ersekë and KS Flamurtari Vlorë in the Albanian Superliga.
