= Jorgo Meksi =

Greek-born Albanian footballer

Personal information
- Date of birth: 21 March 1995 (age 31)
- Place of birth: Greece
- Height: 1.72 m (5 ft 8 in)
- Position: Right-back

Team information
- Current team: Dinamo
- Number: 23

Youth career
- –2014: Panionios

Senior career*
Years	Team	Apps	(Gls)
2014–2015	Panionios	0	(0)
2015–2019	Ilisiakos		
2019–2022	Skënderbeu	80	(6)
2022–2023	Kukësi	7	(0)
2024–	Dinamo	57	(1)

International career
2013	Albania U19	2	(0)
- * Club domestic league appearances and goals as of 25 June 2026

Jorgo Meksi (born 21 March 1995) is a professional footballer who plays as a right-back for Dinamo City. Born in Greece, he has represented Albania at youth international level.

== Honours ==
=== Club ===
Dinamo City

- Albanian Cup: 2024–25
