= 2010 Albanian Cup final =

Association football competition

- Event: 2009–10 Albanian Cup
Besa	Vllaznia
2	1
- Date: 9 May 2010
- Venue: Qemal Stafa Stadium, Tirana
- Referee: Darko Čeferin (Slovenia)
- Attendance: 10,000

The 2010 Albanian Cup final was the 58th final of the Albanian Cup. The final was played at the Qemal Stafa Stadium in Tirana on 9 May 2010. The match was contested by Besa, who beat Shkumbini in their semi-final, and Vllaznia who beat Teuta.

== Match ==
=== Details ===
9 May 2010
20:45 CEST

Besa	2–1 (a.e.t.)	Vllaznia
Arapi 85'; Dhëmbi 97'	Report	Balaj 63'

Qemal Stafa Stadium, Tirana
Attendance: 10,000
Referee: Darko Čeferin (Slovenia)
