= Sigitas Olberkis =

Lithuanian footballer

Personal information
- Date of birth: 19 April 1997 (age 29)
- Place of birth: Pakruojis, Lithuania
- Height: 1.92 m (6 ft 3 1/2 in)
- Position: Centre back

Youth career
- 2013–2014: Kruoja

Senior career*
Years	Team	Apps	(Gls)
2014–2015	Kruoja	8	(0)
2015	→ Kruoja-2	21	(3)
2015	Šiauliai	3	(0)
2016	Panevėžys	28	(3)
2017	Dnepr Mogilev	8	(0)
2018	Jelgava	22	(0)
2019	Žalgiris	8	(0)
2019	Senglea Athletic	18	(0)
2020	Sligo Rovers	3	(0)
2021	Legion Tallinn	29	(3)
2022	Dalkurd	9	(0)
2023–2024	FA Šiauliai	62	(2)
2025–2026	Elbasani	27	(1)

International career
2017–2018	Lithuania U21	9	(0)
- * Club domestic league appearances and goals as of 24 June 2026

Sigitas Olberkis (born 19 April 1997) is a Lithuanian professional footballer who plays as a centre-back.

== Career ==
=== FK Jelgava ===
Olberkis signed for FK Jelgava in March 2018, but left the club at the end of the year.

In the first half of the 2019 season, he was member of FK Žalgiris.
