= Artan Mërgjyshi =

Albanian footballer and coach

Personal information
- Date of birth: 6 May 1968 (age 58)
- Place of birth: Tirana, PR Albania
- Height: 1.81 m (5 ft 11 in)
- Position: Defender

Youth career
- Partizani

Senior career*
Years	Team	Apps	(Gls)
1988–1990	Korabi		
1992–2000	Partizani		
2000–2001	Dinamo Tirana	8	(0)
2001–2002	Erzeni	11	(0)
2002–2003	Besa	23	(2)
2003–2004	Apolonia	6	(0)

International career
1996	Albania	1	(0)

Managerial career
- 2008–2011: Dinamo Tirana (assistant)
- 2011: Dinamo Tirana
- 2011–2012: Dinamo Tirana
- 2012: Kastrioti
- 2013–2014: Besa
- 2015–2016: Apolonia
- 2016: Korabi
- 2017–2018: Bylis
- 2018: Laçi
- 2019–2020: Apolonia
- 2022-2023: Vora
- 2024–: Apolonia
- * Club domestic league appearances and goals

Artan Mërgjyshi (born 6 May 1968) is an Albanian professional football coach and former player.

During his playing career, he enjoyed his best years with Partizani, while also having stints with Dinamo Tirana, Erzeni, Besa and Apolonia. He has been a former Albanian international, making one senior appearance in 1996.

== International career ==
Mërgjyshi has only one cap with Albania. He played his first and only match with Red and Blacks on 24 April 1996 against the newest national team of Bosnia and Herzegovina, playing full-90 minutes in a goalless draw.

== Managerial career ==
In January 2015, Mërgjyshi was appointed as manager of struggling Apolonia with the only goal to avoid the team's relegation in Kategoria e Parë. Apolonia, however, was relegated one division lower after losing 1–0 at Niko Dovana Stadium against the survival rivals of Teuta in the penultimate week of the 2014–15 season.

On 7 August 2018, Mërgjyshi was named the new manager of Laçi, replacing Besnik Prenga. In December 2018 he was replaced by Migen Memelli. In the summer of 2019 he was reappointed manager of Apolonia.

== Honours ==
Partizani

- Albanian Cup: 1996–97
