= Indrit Prodani =

Albanian footballer

Personal information
- Date of birth: 20 May 1998 (age 28)
- Place of birth: Laç, Albania
- Position: Defender

Team information
- Current team: Drenica
- Number: 13

Youth career
- 2012–2013: Adriatiku
- 2013–2015: AF Brians
- 2016: Laçi
- 2016–2017: Partizani Tirana

Senior career*
Years	Team	Apps	(Gls)
2017–2018	Laçi	2	(0)
2018–2019	Hrvatski Dragovoljac	0	(0)
2019–2020	NK Zagreb		
2020–2022	Kastrioti	54	(2)
2022–2023	Dinamo City	38	(5)
2024–2025	Laçi	34	(1)
2025–	Drenica	33	(1)
- * Club domestic league appearances and goals as of 22 June 2026

Indrit Prodani (born 20 May 1998) is an Albanian footballer who plays as a defender for Laçi in the Kategoria Superiore.

== Career ==
=== Kastrioti ===
In January 2020, Prodani signed with Kastrioti, returning to his home country after a year and a half abroad. He made his league debut for the club on 15 February 2020, playing the entirety of a 1–0 victory over Dinamo Tirana.

=== Dinamo Tirana ===
On 31 January 2022, Prodani signed with Dinamo Tirana.

=== Drenica ===
In August, 2025, Prodani joined Drenica of the Football Superleague of Kosovo.
