= Bledar Borova =

Albanian coach manager (born 1983)

Personal information
- Full name: Bledar Borova
- Date of birth: 27 October 1983 (age 43)
- Place of birth: Fier, Albania

Team information
- Current team: Apolonia (academy director)

Managerial career
- Years: Team
- 20xx–2020: Apolonia U17
- 20xx–: Apolonia U19
- 2020–2021: Apolonia (caretaker)
- 2023–: Albpetrol Patos

Bledar Borova (born 27 October 1983) is an Albanian football coach of Albpetrol Patos. He was the director of Apolonia's academy and the head coach of the club's under-19s side.
