= Ibrahim Mustapha (Nigerian footballer) =

Nigerian footballer

Personal information
- Date of birth: 1 September 1996 (age 30)
- Place of birth: Maiduguri, Nigeria
- Height: 1.71 m (5 ft 7 in)
- Position: Striker

Team information
- Current team: Dinamo City
- Number: 19

Senior career*
Years	Team	Apps	(Gls)
2016	El-Kanemi Warriors	20	(9)
2017–2018	Enyimba	52	(8)
2019	Gombe United	2	(0)
2019–2021	Plateau United	37	(19)
2020–2021	→ Dibba Al-Hisn (loan)	7	(3)
2021–2022	Al-Hilal Club		
2022–2023	Plateau United	14	(5)
2023–2024	Kano Pillars	30	(11)
2024–2025	El-Kanemi Warriors	14	(7)
2025–2026	Bylis	29	(9)
2026–	Dinamo City	11	(0)

International career^{‡}
2018	Nigeria	4	(0)
- * Club domestic league appearances and goals as of 25 June 2026 ‡ National team caps and goals as of 19:06, 6 March 2023 (UTC)

Ibrahim Mustapha (born 1 September 1996) is a Nigerian international footballer who plays as a striker for Dinamo City and the Nigeria national team.

== Career ==
Born in Maiduguri, he has played club football for El-Kanemi Warriors, Enyimba, Gombe United and Plateau United. He sent 3 months on loan at UAE side Dibba Al-Hisn. Following his return from his loan spell, he was linked with a transfer to Egypt. He moved to Al-Hilal Club in 2021, but returned to Plateau in 2022.

He rejoined his boyhood club, El-Kanemi Warriors in 2024 after spending a season with Kano Pillars.

He made his international debut for Nigeria in 2018.
