= Korabi Stadium =

Albanian multi-use stadium

- Interactive map of Korabi Stadium
- Location: Peshkopi, Albania
- Coordinates: 41°40′49.3″N 20°25′31.1″E
- Owner: Korabi Peshkopi
- Capacity: 6,000
- Surface: Grass

Tenant
- Korabi Peshkopi

Korabi Stadium (Albanian: Stadiumi I Korabit is a multi-use stadium in Peshkopi, Albania. The stadium has a capacity of 6,000 people and it is mostly used for football matches and it is the home ground of Korabi Peshkopi.
