= KS Korabi =

Albanian football club

- Full name: Klubi Sportiv Korabi
- Nicknames: Arbrit Ultras; Dibranët
- Founded: March 3, 1935; 91 years ago
- Ground: Korabi Stadium
- Capacity: 6,000
- President: Fehmi Meziu
- Manager: Sokol Mziu
- League: Kategoria e Parë
- 2025–26: Kategoria e Parë, 8th
Home colours	Away colours	Third colours

KS Korabi is an Albanian football club based in Peshkopi, named after the nearby Mount Korab, which is the tallest mountain in Albania and North Macedonia. The club's home ground is the Korabi Stadium.

== History ==
=== Early years ===
The club was founded on 3 March 1935 as Bashkimi Dibran Peshkopi, and they competed in the Albanian First Division for the first time in 1936, where they were placed in Group B alongside Devolli Bilisht, and the eventual group winners Shkumbini Peqin. The club did not compete in another national competition before it was dissolved in 1944, which led to the creation of the Shoqeria Sportive Korabi (Korabi Sports Society) in 1945 with a total of 60 members and 32 associates. The club changed its name to Peshkopia in 1949, as they competed in the First Division once again, where they were placed in one of 13 regional groups alongside local amateur clubs Brezhda, Dohoshisht, Greva, Homesh, Maqellara and Shupenza. Peshkopia won the group and progressed through to the second round, where they failed to finish in the top 3 to reach the final round. In 1950, the club participated in the First Division again, and they defeated KF Bulqiza in the first round before being eliminated to Ylli Kuq Kamëz in the second round.

The club participated for the first time in the Albanian First Division in 1963. Between 1963 and 2004, they played in the Albanian Second Division. In 2004–2015, they played in the Albanian Third Division. In the 2014/2015 season, Trainer was Erblin Laci, Vice trainer Shpetim Toska, Club Director Sokol Muho, President Femi Meziu.

=== Recent revival ===
In the 2014–2015 season, KS Korabi is in First place in Second Albanian League with 24 match played 22 wins and 1 draw 1 loss. Scored 44 goals and conceded 12. Korabi lost 3–1 the supercup against Gramshi in the final between the first places in Group A and B in Second Category. A 3–0 win over KF Albpetrol on 10 May 2015, the club was promoted back to the Albanian Second Division.

Korabi completed back to back promotions as they defeated Ada Velipojë 1–0 at the Reshit Rusi Stadium on the final matchday of the regular season in Group A of the Albanian First Division to secure promotion to the Albanian Superliga after a 54-year absence. They then faced Group B winners Luftëtari Gjirokastër in the championship final at the Qemal Stafa Stadium on 19 May 2016, where they failed to win their first trophy since 1983, as they lost 11–10 in a penalty shootout that saw 24 penalties being taken following a goalless draw and extra time. Following their return to the top flight the club's head coach Dritan Mehmeti left the club along with his coaching staff and on 11 July 2016 it was announced that former Korabi Peshkopi player Artan Mërgjyshi would be the head coach for the 2016–17 season, with Ermal Nexhipi as his assistant. As the Korabi Stadium failed to meet the licensing criteria for the Albanian Superliga and all of the 2016–17 games were to be played behind closed doors due to a stadium ban, the club was unable to play its home games in Peshkopi, and on 16 July an agreement was reached with KF Tirana and its chairman Refik Halili that allowed the club to play its home games at the Selman Stërmasi Stadium and for the squad to train at KF Tirana's Skender Halili Complex.

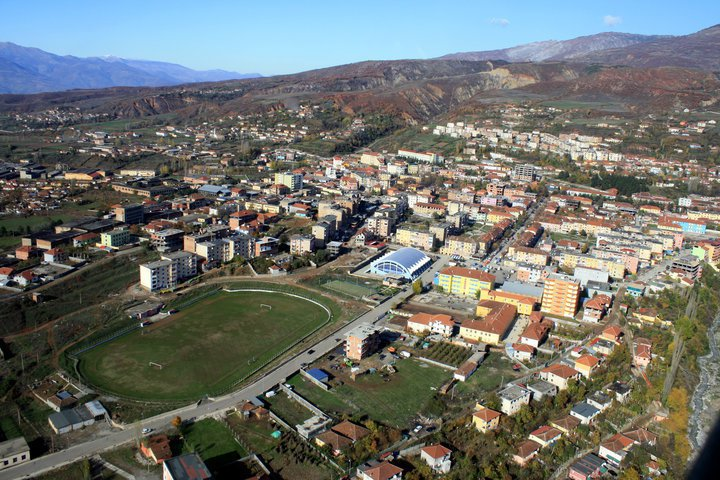
Aerial view of the Korabi Stadium

== Honours ==
League

Kategoria e Parë

- Runners-up (2): 1961, 2015–16

Kategoria e Dytë

- Winners (2): 1977–78, 1982–83
- Runners-up (1): 2014–15

== Current squad ==
As of 31 January 2024

Note: Flags indicate national team as defined under FIFA eligibility rules; some limited exceptions apply. Players may hold more than one non-FIFA nationality.

No.	Pos.	Nation	Player
1	GK	ALB	Leonid Varfi
3	DF	ALB	Gjevahir Paplekaj
4	DF	ALB	Andri Xhafa
6	FW	ALB	Klajdi Kryemadhi
7	MF	ALB	Sokol Mziu
8	MF	ENG	Henry Marku
9	FW	ALB	Taulant Marku
10	MF	ALB	Irgi Kasalla
11	FW	ALB	Ariel Dobra
12	GK	ALB	Avernold Qyrani
13	DF	ALB	Vilson Lila
14	MF	ALB	Antonio Tanushi
17	MF	ALB	Klodian Nuri
18	MF	ALB	Klaidi Tershalla
20	MF	ALB	Envi Bocka

No.	Pos.	Nation	Player
23	FW	ALB	Benardo Fida
24	MF	ALB	Ridi Koci
25	FW	ALB	Segerso Geci
26	MF	ALB	Bradly Buci
29	MF	ALB	Laurenc Xheka
77	DF	ALB	Skender Lilaj
99	DF	ALB	Klaus Hasaj
—	DF	ALB	Raul Rahimi
—	DF	ALB	Erjon Sina
—	MF	CAN	Egzon Jetishi
—	FW	ALB	Marko Çema
—	FW	ALB	Dionis Çikani
—	FW	ALB	Hernan Reci
—	FW	ALB	Ertigen Shehu

== List of managers ==
- (Albania) Rexhep Spahiu
- (Albania) Bexhet Shehu (1963–1986)
- (Albania) Dritan Mehmeti (Sep 2015 – Jun 2016)
- (Albania) Artan Mërgjyshi (Jul 2016 - Oct 2016)
- (Albania) Gerd Haxhiu (Nov 2016 - Apr 2017)
- (Albania) Julian Ahmataj (Aug 2017 – Dec 2017)
- (Albania) Dorjan Bubeqi (Jan 2018 - Feb 2020)
- (Albania) Klevis Dalipi (Feb 2020 - Jan 2021)
- (Albania) Agim Canaj (Jan 2021 - Jun 2021)
- (Albania) Artan Mërgjyshi (Aug 2021 - Apr 2022)
- (Albania) Donald Mëziu (Jun 2022 - Jun 2022)
- (Albania) Shpend Kumbarçe (Jul 2022– 1 Jul 2024)
- (Albania) Agim Canaj (2 Jul 2024– 4 Mar 2025)
- (Albania) Ermal Nexhipi (4 Mar 2025 - 6 Mar 2025)
- (Albania) Alfred Deliallisi (7 Mar 2025 - 1 Jun 2026)
- (Albania) Sokol Mziu (1 Jul 2026 -)
