= Alvi Ahmetaj =

Albanian footballer (born 1998)

Personal information
- Date of birth: 12 July 1998 (age 28)
- Place of birth: Gjirokastër, Albania
- Height: 1.75 m (5 ft 9 in)
- Position: Midfielder

Team information
- Current team: Luftëtari
- Number: 17

Youth career
- –2017: Luftëtari FC

Senior career*
| Years | Team | Apps | (Gls) |
| 2017– | Tirana B | 7 | (0) |
| 2017–2018 | Tirana | 1 | (0) |
| 2019– | Luftëtari FC | 5 | (0) |
- * Club domestic league appearances and goals as of 23 December 2017

Alvi Ahmetaj (born 12 July 1998) is an Albanian footballer who plays as a midfielder for Luftëtari Gjirokastër.
