= Mangana, Xanthi =

Mangana Μάγγανα
- Community
- Location within Greece
- Coordinates: 40°57′N 24°52′E
- Country: Greece
- Administrative region: East Macedonia and Thrace
- Regional unit: Xanthi
- Municipality: Topeiros
- Municipal unit: Topeiros

Population (2021)
  - Community: 551
- Time zone: UTC+2 (EET)
  - Summer (DST): UTC+3 (EEST)

Mangana (Greek: Μάγγανα) is a settlement in the municipality Topeiros in the Xanthi regional unit of Greece. In 2021, the population was 551.
