= Neritan Novi =

Albanian footballer and manager

Personal information
- Full name: Neritan Novi
- Date of birth: 3 September 1970 (age 56)
- Place of birth: Gjirokastër, Albania
- Position: Midfielder

Senior career*
| Years | Team | Apps | (Gls) |
| 199x–2000 | Shqiponja | | |
| 2000–2001 | Tomori | | |
| 2002–2003 | Besa | | |
| 2006–2008 | Luftëtari | | |
| 2008–2009 | Bylis | | |
| 2009–2010 | Luftëtari | | |

International career
| 1995 | Albania | 1 | (0) |

Managerial career
- 2020: Luftëtari
- * Club domestic league appearances and goals

Neritan Novi (born 3 September 1970) is an Albanian football manager and former player.

== International statistics ==
As of 23 March 2020

Albania national team
| Year | Apps | Goals |
|---|---|---|
| 1995 | 1 | 0 |
| Total | 1 | 0 |
