= Klinti Qato =

Albanian footballer

Personal information
- Date of birth: 23 December 1997 (age 28)
- Place of birth: Kuçovë, Albania
- Height: 1.70 m (5 ft 7 in)
- Position: Midfielder

Team information
- Current team: Vllaznia Shkodër
- Number: 25

Senior career*
Years	Team	Apps	(Gls)
2018–2019	Teuta Durrës	1	(0)
2019–2020	Luftëtari Gjirokaster	22	(0)
2020–2021	Tomori Berat	18	(2)
2021–2024	Laçi	62	(3)
2024–	Vllaznia Shkodër	63	(5)
- * Club domestic league appearances and goals as of 24 June 2026

Klinti Qato (born 23 December 1997) is an Albanian footballer who plays as a midfielder for Vllaznia Shkodër in the Kategoria Superiore.

== Career ==
=== Luftëtari ===
In August 2019, Qato joined Luftëtari in the Albanian Superliga. He made his league debut for the club on 24 August 2019 in a 3–0 away defeat to KF Tirana.

=== Tomori ===
In the summer 2020 he joined KF Tomori on a free transfer.Qato scored he's first professional goal against KF Lushnja on February 27, 2021.
