= Beji Anthony =

Nigerian footballer

Personal information
- Full name: Amos Beji Anthony
- Date of birth: 4 January 1999 (age 27)
- Place of birth: Pankshin, Nigeria
- Height: 1.78 m (5 ft 10 in)
- Position: Midfielder

Team information
- Current team: Flamurtari
- Number: 13

Senior career*
Years	Team	Apps	(Gls)
2017–2019	Egnatia	14	(3)
2018–2019	→ Bylis (loan)	20	(8)
2019–2023	Bylis	71	(16)
2023–	Flamurtari	13	(1)
- * Club domestic league appearances and goals as of 10 February 2024

Amos Beji Anthony (born 4 January 1999) is a Nigerian footballer who plays as a midfielder for Flamurtari in the Kategoria e Parë.

== Career statistics ==
=== Club ===
As of 22 July 2018.

Club	Season	League			Cup		Continental		Other		Total	
Club	Season	Division	Apps	Goals	Apps	Goals	Apps	Goals	Apps	Goals	Apps	Goals
FK Egnatia	2017–18	Albanian First Division	14	3	0	0	–		0	0	14	3
FK Egnatia	2018–19	Albanian First Division	0	0	0	0	–		0	0	0	0
Career total			14	3	0	0	0	0	0	0	14	3
