= Nikolin Çoçlli =

Albanian footballer and manager

Personal information
- Full name: Nikolin Çoçlli
- Date of birth: 17 October 1968 (age 58)
- Place of birth: Korçë, Albania
- Position: Midfielder

Senior career*
Years	Team	Apps	(Gls)
198x–1990	Skënderbeu		
1990–1994	Partizani		
1995–1999	Tirana		
1999–2000	Partizani	?	(1)

Managerial career
- 2010–2011: Rubiku
- 2011–2012: Olimpic Tirana
- 2012: Partizani
- 2013–2018: Partizani U17
- 2018–2019: Football Republic
- 2020: Luftëtari
- * Club domestic league appearances and goals

Nikolin Çoçlli (born 17 October 1968) is an Albanian football manager and former player.
