= KF Bylis =

Albanian football club

Bylis
- Full name: Klubi i Futbollit Bylis
- Founded: 14 July 1972; 54 years ago as U.P.TH.N Unaza e Përpunimit të Thellë të Naftës (1972–80) Ballshi i Ri (1980–91) Ballshi (1991–92) Bylis (1992–present)
- Ground: Adush Muça Stadium
- Capacity: 2,464
- President: Besnik Kapllanaj
- Manager: Arlind Rustemi
- League: Kategoria e Parë
- 2025–26: Kategoria Superiore, 9th (relegated)
| Home colours | Away colours |

Klubi i Futbollit Bylis is an Albanian professional football club based in Ballsh, part of Mallakastër municipality. They compete in Kategoria e Parë, the second tier of Albanian football. Their home ground is Adush Muça Stadium.

== History ==
=== Early years ===
The club was formed on 14 July 1972 as Ballshi i Ri, and they played in the Albanian Third Division between 1973 and 1976. But between 1976 and 1981, they were not allowed to participate in Albanian football due to laws restricting a single team from each district. They began playing once again in the Third Division in 1981, which they eventually won in 1986 and were promoted to the Albanian Second Division. The club played in the Second Division for 10 years between 1986 and 1996, where they were promoted following a successful 1995–96 season which saw the club score 124 goals and concede just 21, as the best goal scorer was Agim Metaj, making it a national record which was even noted by the prestigious French magazine France Football. However, despite their record breaking season they only finished as runners-up in the league but still achieved promotion to the Albanian Superliga.

=== Golden days ===
In their debut season in the top flight of Albanian football the club finished in 14th place out of 18 teams. During the 1998–99 season, the club finished in third place, just 2 points behind the eventual champions KF Tirana this earned the club a place in the UEFA Cup for the first time. In their first European experience, KF Bylis played Slovak side Inter Bratislava, whom they lost 5–1 to on aggregate. The following season they would again finish strongly, this time in 5th place, joint on points with 4th-place side Vllaznia Shkodër, who they lost 4–3 to in the play-off for the UEFA Intertoto Cup place. In the 2000–01 season, they finished 5th once again and earned a place in the UEFA Intertoto Cup, where they met Romanian side FC Universitatea Craiova the following season. They lost 4–3 on aggregate, after a memorable 3–3 draw away in Romania and a 1–0 home loss.

=== Recent history ===
KF Bylis then began to struggle, eventually getting relegated after a poor 2002–03 season, which saw them finish second to last with just 26 points and 3 wins from 26 games. They were relegated once again to the third tier after the 2004–05 season in which they scored just 13 league goals in total. Between 2007 and 2009 the club achieved consecutive promotions back to the Albanian Superliga for the 2008–09 season.

Besnik Kapllanaj was the club's president between 2006 and 2014 and owned a 75% share in the club, with the remaining 25% owned by the Ballsh Municipality.

On 15 March 2014 in a home tie against KF Laçi, the club's president was involved in an altercation with the FSHS head of competitions, Besnik Çela. Kapllanaj hit the FSHF delegate Çela in the head with a baton which required him to be rushed to hospital due to the injury. Cela refused to start the game due to overcrowding inside the Adush Muça Stadium. Once some of the fans had left they began to throw rock into the stadium in disapproval of the FSHF's decision to not let them watch the match, which kicked off 20 minutes later than scheduled. Kapllanaj then allegedly caused a power cut so that SuperSport Albania cameras could not transmit the game live as was planned. In the closing stages of the game KF Laçi were awarded a penalty which caused crowd trouble, as they began to throw rocks onto the pitch. KF Laçi's president Pashk Laska instructed captain and penalty taker Erjon Vuçaj to miss the penalty intentionally to avoid further trouble and danger for his teammates. Following the final whistle, Kapllanaj physically abused KF Laçi's players by hitting them with a baton, as well as Besnik Çela, who later filed a police report against Kapllanaj once he left the hospital. On 19 March, the club's president Besnik Kapllanaj resigned from his post hours before the verdict from the FSHF disciplinary commission, who punished him with a lifetime ban from sporting activities in Albania. The commission also expelled the club from the Albanian Superliga with 9 remaining games of the 2013–14 season, relegating the club to the Albanian First Division for the 2014–15 season as well as handing KF Laçi a 3–0 victory in the game which originally ended 0–0. The following day, Kapllanaj turned himself in to the Fier police authorities after being charged for assault.

== Recent seasons ==
| Season | Division | Pos. | Pl. | W | D | L | GS | GA | P | Cup | Top scorer |
|---|---|---|---|---|---|---|---|---|---|---|---|
| 2010–11 | Kategoria Superiore | 6th | 33 | 13 | 4 | 16 | 44 | 48 | 43 | QF | (Albania) Fjodor Xhafa 10 |
| 2011–12 | Kategoria Superiore | 6th | 26 | 9 | 8 | 9 | 40 | 37 | 35 | QF | (Albania) Amarildo Dimo 9 |
| 2012–13 | Kategoria Superiore | 9th | 26 | 9 | 6 | 11 | 32 | 29 | 33 | RU | (Nigeria) Solomonson Izuchukwuka 11 |
| 2013–14 | Kategoria Superiore | 12th | 33 | 5 | 9 | 19 | 20 | 54 | 24 | QF | (Nigeria) Solomonson Izuchukwuka 7 |
| 2014–15 | Kategoria e Parë | 1st | 27 | 17 | 2 | 8 | 46 | 26 | 53 | SR | (Albania) Brunild Pepa 10 |
| 2015–16 | Kategoria Superiore | 9th | 36 | 8 | 8 | 20 | 27 | 53 | 32 | SR | (Albania) Ardit Hoxhaj 7 |
| 2016–17 | Kategoria e Parë | 2nd | 26 | 17 | 6 | 3 | 40 | 15 | 57 | SR | (Albania) Jasmin Raboshta 5 (Albania) Aldo Mitraj 5 |
| 2017–18 | Kategoria e Parë | 2nd | 26 | 14 | 7 | 5 | 43 | 24 | 41 | SR | (Albania) Niko Zisi 9 |
| 2018–19 | Kategoria e Parë | 1st | 26 | 21 | 3 | 2 | 52 | 10 | 42 | SR | (Nigeria) Beji Anthony 6 (Togo) Dosseh Koffi 6 |
| 2019–20 | Kategoria Superiore | 7th | 36 | 12 | 15 | 9 | 46 | 38 | 51 | SF | (Mali) Saliou Guindo 10 |
| 2020–21 | Kategoria Superiore | 9th | 36 | 7 | 10 | 19 | 28 | 51 | 31 | SR | (Nigeria) Beji Anthony 10 |
| 2021–22 | Kategoria e Parë | 1st | 30 | 22 | 3 | 5 | 51 | 18 | 69 | SR | (Albania) Eridon Qardaku 20 |
| 2022–23 | Kategoria Superiore | 9th | 36 | 9 | 11 | 16 | 31 | 42 | 38 | SR | (Albania) Luis Kaçorri 6 |
| 2023–24 | Kategoria e Parë | 2nd | 33 | 22 | 5 | 6 | 55 | 31 | 71 | R16 | (Brazil) Kibe 8 |
| 2024–25 | Kategoria Superiore | 7th | 36 | 11 | 9 | 16 | 33 | 50 | 42 | QF | (Germany) Erich Berko 6 |
| 2025–26 | Kategoria Superiore | 9th | 36 | 10 | 11 | 15 | 38 | 50 | 41 | QF | (Nigeria) Ibrahim Mustapha 7 |
| 2026–27 | Kategoria e Parë | | | | | | | | | | |

== Honours ==
- Albanian Cup
  - Runners-up (1): 2012–13
- Kategoria e Parë
  - Champions (4): 2007–08, 2009–10, 2014–15, 2021–22
  - Runners-up (2): 1995–96, 2023–24
- Kategoria e Dytë
  - Champions (2): 1984–85, 2006–07
- Kategoria e Tretë
  - Champions (2): 2005-06, 2009-10

== KF Bylis in Europe ==
As of December, 2008.

| Season | Competition | Round | Country | Club | Home | Away | Aggregate |
|---|---|---|---|---|---|---|---|
| 1999–00 | UEFA Cup | QR | (Slovakia) | Inter Bratislava | 0–2 | 1–3 | 1–5 |
| 2001 | UEFA Intertoto Cup | 1R | (Romania) | Universitatea Craiova | 0–1 | 3–3 | 3–4 |

- QR = Qualifying Round
- 1R = 1st Round

== Players ==
=== Current squad ===
As of 31 January 2026

Note: Flags indicate national team as defined under FIFA eligibility rules; some limited exceptions apply. Players may hold more than one non-FIFA nationality.

| No. | Pos. | Nation | Player |
|---|---|---|---|
| 1 | GK | ALB | Renato Beqaj |
| 2 | DF | ROU | Radu Negru |
| 3 | DF | BRA | Bruno Nascimento |
| 4 | DF | ALB | Petro Marku |
| 5 | DF | ALB | Kristian Gjini |
| 6 | MF | SEN | Ousmane Kané |
| 7 | FW | NGR | Rabiu Abdullahi |
| 8 | MF | BRA | Guilherme Buranelli |
| 9 | FW | BRA | Olávio Santos |
| 13 | DF | ALB | Fabjan Përndreca |
| 14 | DF | BRA | Igor Almeida |
| 15 | MF | ALB | Paulo Pjeshka |
| 16 | FW | NGR | Olamilekan Adeduro |
| 17 | FW | NIG | Aboubacar Camara |
| 18 | FW | ALB | Ergi Hodo |
| 19 | DF | MKD | Dime Dimov |

| No. | Pos. | Nation | Player |
|---|---|---|---|
| 20 | MF | POR | Tomás Castro |
| 21 | MF | ALB | Henri Sulovari |
| 22 | FW | ALB | Ilir Gjuzi |
| 23 | DF | GHA | McCarthy Ofori |
| 25 | GK | LAT | Roberts Ozols |
| 27 | DF | CMR | Kodji Mouctar |
| 29 | FW | ALB | Serxhio Emini |
| 37 | FW | GHA | Faisal Charwetey |
| 41 | FW | NGR | Ibrahim Akibu |
| 44 | DF | ALB | Aurel Marku (captain) |
| 45 | FW | FRA | Jacques Fokam |
| 70 | FW | ITA | Ahmed Sanogo |
| 76 | MF | ALB | Arli Përgjoni |
| 77 | FW | POR | Pedro Vieira |
| 88 | MF | MKD | Gjorgi Stoilov |
| 98 | MF | BRA | Walisson Martins |

== Notable players ==
Had international caps for their respective countries. Players whose name is listed in bold represented their countries while playing for Bylis Ballsh.

Past (and present) players who are the subjects of Wikipedia articles can be found

- (Albania) Agim Metaj
- (Albania) Julian Ahmataj
- (Albania) Klodian Asllani
- (Albania) Engert Bakalli
- (Albania) Endri Bakiu
- (Albania) Ferdinand Bilali
- (Albania) Edmond Dalipi
- (Albania) Klevis Dalipi
- (Albania) Bledar Devolli
- (Albania) Ilir Dibra
- (Albania) Amarildo Dimo
- (Albania) Johan Driza
- (Albania) Anesti Vito
- (Albania) Dashnor Dume
- (Albania) Stivi Frashëri
- (Albania) Alpin Gallo
- (Albania) Romeo Haxhiaj
- (Albania) Isli Hidi
- (Albania) Akil Jakupi
- (Albania) Maringlen Kule
- (Albania) Gentian Muça
- (Albania) Olgert Muka
- (Albania) Oltion Osmani
- (Albania) Artion Poçi
- (Albania) Jetmir Sefa
- (Albania) Gentian Stojku
- (Albania) Daniel Xhafa
- (Albania) Fjodor Xhafa
- (Albania) Ardit Hoxhaj
- (Albania) Niko Zisi
- (Albania) Andi Hadroj
- (Albania) Luis Kaçorri
- (Albania) Eridon Qardaku
- (Albania) Valentino Murataj
- (Albania) Marin Abazaj
- (North Macedonia) Borjan Pancevski
- (North Macedonia) Dimitar Kapinkovski
- (North Macedonia) Kire Ristevski
- (North Macedonia) Mirza Durakovic
- (Serbia) Miloš Stojanović
- (Slovenia) Patrik Bordon
- (Germany) Erich Berko
- (Ecuador) Alex Peralta
- (Brazil) Marco Morgon
- (Brazil) João Ananias
- (Brazil) Kibe
- (Brazil) Birungueta
- (Brazil) Alan Henrique
- (Nigeria) Ndubuisi Egbo
- (Nigeria) Peter Olayinka
- (Nigeria) James Adeniyi
- (Nigeria) Solomonson Izuchukwuka
- (Nigeria) Kehinde Owoeye
- (Nigeria) Odirah Ntephe
- (Nigeria) Beji Anthony
- (Nigeria) Ibrahim Mustapha
- (Nigeria) Malomo Ayodeji
- (Togo) Dosseh Koffi
- (Zambia) January Ziambo
- (Cameroon) Guy Madjo
- (Mali) Saliou Guindo

== List of managers ==
- (Albania) Migjen Skënderi (1995–1998)
- (Albania) Vangjel Capo (1998)
- (Albania) Hysen Dedja (1999)
- (Albania) Shpëtim Duro (1999–2000)
- (Albania) Vasil Bici (2000)
- (Albania) Vangjel Capo (2001)
- (Albania) Petraq Bisha (2001)
- (Albania) Ilir Gjyla (2002)
- (Albania) Andrea Marko (21 Sep 2002 - 7 Dec 2002)
- (Albania) Migjen Skënderi (2003)
- (Albania) Agim Metaj (2003)
- (Albania) Kristaq Mile (2003–2004)
- (Albania) Faruk Sejdini (Jul 2007 – 15 Sep 2008)
- (Albania) Hysen Dedja (15 Sep 2008 – 4 May 2009)
- (Albania) Gerd Haxhiu (4 May 2009 - Jun 2009)
- (Albania) Ilir Spahiu (Jul 2009 - 13 Sep 2010)
- (Albania) Agim Metaj (2010)
- (North Macedonia) Nikola Ilievski (13 Sep 2010 - 7 Mar 2011)
- (Albania) Agim Canaj (7 Mar 2011 - Jun 2011)
- (Kosovo) (Turkey) Naci Şensoy (Jul 2011 - Jun 2012)
- (Albania) Agim Canaj (Jul 2012 - 20 Nov 2012)
- (Kosovo) (Turkey) Naci Şensoy (20 Nov 2012 - Jun 2013)
- (Nigeria) (Albania) Ndubuisi Egbo (1 Aug 2013 – 30 May 2014)
- (Albania) Roland Nenaj (1 Jul 2014 - 31 May 2015)
- (Albania) Agim Canaj (28 Jul 2015 - 8 Oct 2015)
- (Italy) Mauro De Vecchis (8 Oct 2015 - 23 Oct 2015)
- (Albania) Marenglen Kule (23 Oct 2015 - 29 Jan 2016)
- (Bosnia and Herzegovina) Adnan Zildžović (29 Jan 2016 - Jul 2016)
- (Albania) Julian Ahmataj (Sep 2016 - Oct 2016)
- (Albania) Eqerem Memushi (14 Oct 2016 - 26 Jan 2017)
- (Albania) Artan Mërgjyshi (Jan 2017 - Apr 2017)
- (Brazil) Marcello Troisi (Apr 2017 – May 2017)
- (Albania) Bledar Devolli (5 Aug 2017 - 4 Oct 2017)
- (Albania) Stavri Nica (Oct 2017 - Nov 2017)
- (Brazil) Marcello Troisi (Jan 2018 – Feb 2018)
- (Bosnia and Herzegovina) Veljko Dovedan (1 July 2018 – 6 June 2021)
- (North Macedonia) Jeton Beqiri (7 June 2021 – 15 Aug 2022 )
- (Albania) Arjan Bellaj (16 Aug 2022 - 22 Jan 2023)
- (Kosovo) (Turkey) Naci Şensoy (23 Jan 2023 - 5 Jun 2023)
- (Albania) Febron Ziu (10 Jul 2023 - 6 Aug 2023)
- (Albania) Arjan Bellaj (7 Aug 2023 - 23 May 2024)
- (Nigeria) (Albania) Ndubuisi Egbo (4 Jul 2024 - 24 Sep 2024)
- (Albania) Nevil Dede (25 Sep 2024 - 9 Feb 2025)
- (Albania) Gentian Mezani (11 Feb 2025 - 1 Jun 2025)
- (Albania) Mirel Josa (21 Jul 2025 - 1 Jun 2026)
- (Albania) Arlind Rustemi (24 Jul 2025 -)
