= 2020–21 FK Apolonia Fier season =

Apolonia Fier
2020–21 season
- Owner: Koço Kokëdhima
- Manager: Fabrizio Cammarata
- Stadium: Loni Papuçiu Stadium
- Kategoria Superiore: 10th
- Albanian Cup: Round of 16
Home colours	Away colours	Third colours

Apolonia Fier are an Albanian football club based in Fier. The 2020–21 season will be the clubs 95th competitive season since the club was founded. During this season the club will have competed in the following competitions: Kategoria Superiore, Albanian Cup.

== Current squad ==
As of 22 February 2021

Note: Flags indicate national team as defined under FIFA eligibility rules; some limited exceptions apply. Players may hold more than one non-FIFA nationality.

No.	Pos.	Nation	Player
1	GK	ALB	Gazmir Çepele
3	DF	ALB	Benito Culli
4	DF	ALB	Ersildio Asllanaj
5	DF	ALB	Rei Zaimi (on loan from Turbina)
7	MF	ALB	Redon Mihana
8	MF	ALB	Aleksandro Zaimaj
9	FW	ALB	Mario Gjata
10	MF	ALB	Erisildo Smaçi
13	DF	ALB	Serjan Repaj
14	MF	ALB	Skerdilajd Levendi
17	FW	ALB	Mariel Sota
18	MF	ALB	Stefano Omeri
19	MF	ALB	Ksement Mehmeti

No.	Pos.	Nation	Player
20	FW	ALB	Jeton Krasniqi
24	DF	ALB	Arlind Kurti
25	MF	ALB	Mateo Shanaj
28	DF	ALB	Eljon Sota
30	DF	GHA	Benjamin Agyare
31	GK	ALB	Endrit Cako
33	FW	ALB	Krisild Zoga
55	GK	ALB	Romeo Harizaj
66	DF	SEN	Ismaila Diop
67	FW	NGA	Effiong Eyoh
77	FW	CRO	Mario Vasilj (on loan from Dinamo Zagreb)
88	MF	GHA	Kofi Yeboah
99	MF	ALB	Rimal Haxhiu

== Competitions ==
=== Kategoria Superiore ===
==== League table ====
Pos	Team	Pld	W	D	L	GF	GA	GD	Pts	Qualification or relegation
6	Kukësi	36	13	6	17	47	48	−1	45	
7	Skënderbeu	36	9	10	17	34	55	−21	37	
8	Kastrioti (O)	36	8	11	17	26	44	−18	35	Qualification for the relegation play-off
9	Bylis (R)	36	7	10	19	28	51	−23	31	Relegation to the 2021–22 Kategoria e Parë
10	Apolonia (R)	36	4	9	23	22	67	−45	21	Relegation to the 2021–22 Kategoria e Parë

Source: Albanian Football Association, Soccerway
Rules for classification: 1) Points; 2) Head-to-head points; 3) Head-to-head goal difference; 4) Head-to-head goals scored; 5) Goal difference; 6) Goals scored; 7) Draw.
(O) Play-off winners; (R) Relegated

==== Results summary ====
Overall								Home						Away					
Pld	W	D	L	GF	GA	GD	Pts	W	D	L	GF	GA	GD	W	D	L	GF	GA	GD
36	4	9	23	22	67	−45	21	4	3	11	12	30	−18	0	6	12	10	37	−27

Last updated: 26 May 2021.
Source: Soccerway

==== Matches ====
4 November 2020 Match 1	Vllaznia Shkodër	2–0	Apolonia Fier	Shkodër
16:45 CET	Krymi (yellow card) 38'; Dilaver 54'; Imami (yellow card) 67'; Dunga 82'	Report	Erisildo Smaçi (yellow card) 22'; Yeboah (yellow card) 34'	Stadium: Loro Boriçi Stadium; Attendance: 0 Referee: (Albania) Juxhin Xhaja
Note: COVID-19 pandemic in Albania

8 November 2020 Match 2	Apolonia Fier	2–2	Bylis	Fier
13:45 CET	Rimal Haxhiu 7'; Mihana 18'; Bernard Arthur (yellow card) 67'	Report	Ndreca 28' 69'	Stadium: Loni Papuçiu Stadium; Attendance: 0 Referee: (Albania) Klajdi Kola
Note: COVID-19 pandemic in Albania

21 November 2020 Match 3	Kastrioti Krujë	1–1	Apolonia Fier	Kamëz
13:45 CET	Boyom (yellow card) 27'; Çela (yellow card) 61'; Sebino Plaku 85' (pen.)	Report	Rimal Haxhiu (yellow card) 48'; Ksement Mehmeti (yellow card) 60'; Harizaj (yellow card) 67'; Mihana 80'; Sota (yellow card) 84'; Bernard Arthur (yellow card) 84'	Stadium: Kamëz Stadium; Attendance: 0 Referee: (Albania) Roxhers Muska
Note: COVID-19 pandemic in Albania

25 November 2020 Match 4	Apolonia Fier	0–3	Partizani Tirana	Fier
13:45 CET		Report	Bitri 41'; Bardhi 58'; Idrizaj 80'	Stadium: Loni Papuçiu Stadium; Attendance: 0 Referee: (Albania) Blerim Ziri
Note: COVID-19 pandemic in Albania

29 November 2020 Match 5	Laçi	6–1	Apolonia Fier	Laç
13:45 CET	Nwabueze 37' 39' 61'; Turkaj (yellow card) 55'; Selmani (yellow card) 57'; Xhixha 64' 90+3'; Marku 85'	Report	Erisildo Smaçi (yellow card) 17'; Stefano Omeri 23'; Rubin Hebeja (yellow card) 50'; Drago Bumbar (yellow card) 60'; Mihana (yellow card) 70'	Stadium: Laçi Stadium; Attendance: 0 Referee: (Albania) Erjon Bastari
Note: COVID-19 pandemic in Albania

5 December 2020 Match 6	Kukësi	1–0	Apolonia Fier	Elbasan
16:45 CET	Taipi (yellow card) 70'; Eze 76'	Report	Rimal Haxhiu (yellow card) 57'; Sota (yellow card) 70'; Mihana (yellow card) 77'	Stadium: Elbasan Arena; Attendance: 0 Referee: (Albania) Indrit Myrtja
Note: COVID-19 pandemic in Albania

9 December 2020 Match 7	Apolonia Fier	1–0	Skënderbeu Korçë	Fier
13:45 CET	Erisildo Smaçi (yellow card) 13'; Gjata 80' (pen.); Stefano Omeri (yellow card) 90+2'	Report	Rrapaj (yellow card) 45'; Ditmar Bicaj (yellow card) 90'	Stadium: Loni Papuçiu Stadium; Attendance: 0 Referee: (Albania) Eldorjan Hamiti
Note: COVID-19 pandemic in Albania

13 December 2020 Match 8	Tirana	3–0	Apolonia Fier	Tirana
13:45 CET	Najdovski (yellow card) 15'; Ismailgeci 49'; Batha 74'; Vangjeli (yellow card) 77'; Muçi 86'	Report		Stadium: Selman Stërmasi Stadium; Attendance: 0 Referee: (Albania) Florjan Lata
Note: COVID-19 pandemic in Albania

19 December 2020 Match 9	Apolonia Fier	0–1	Teuta Durrës	Fier
13:45 CET	Drago Bumbar (yellow card) 47'; Harizaj (yellow card) 90+2'; Sota (yellow card) 90+2'	Report	Vila 28'; Aleksi (yellow card) 67'; Daja (yellow card) 88'	Stadium: Loni Papuçiu Stadium; Attendance: 0 Referee: (Albania) Laver Alla
Note: COVID-19 pandemic in Albania

23 December 2020 Match 10	Apolonia Fier	0–1	Vllaznia Shkodër	Fier
13:45 CET	Serjan Repaj (yellow card) 53'; Erisildo Smaçi (yellow card) 63'; Eyoh (yellow card) 88'	Report	Hoxhaj 40'; Shehi (yellow card) 66'; Imeri (yellow card) 70'	Stadium: Loni Papuçiu Stadium; Attendance: 0 Referee: (Albania) Andi Koçi
Note: COVID-19 pandemic in Albania

=== Albanian Cup ===
1 November 2020 First Round	Apolonia Fier	4–1	Turbina Cërrik	Fier
13:30 CET	Yeboah 23' (yellow card) 32'; Gjata 26' (pen.); Mihana 48'; Stefano Omeri (yellow card) 81'; Eyoh 88'; Mariel Sota (yellow card) 89'	Report	Mikel Brahilika (yellow card) 42'; Aladin Sallaku 83'	Stadium: Loni Papuçiu Stadium; Attendance: 0 Referee: (Albania) Endrit Zhuli

12 November 2020 Round of 16	Partizani Tirana	1–0	Apolonia Fier	Pogradec
13:30 CET	Brown 19'; Bitri (yellow card) 85'	Report		Stadium: Gjorgji Kyçyku Stadium; Attendance: 0 Referee: (Albania) Blerim Ziri
