= 2022–23 FK Partizani Tirana season =

Partizani Tirana
2022–23 season
- President: Gazmend Demi
- Head coach: Dritan Mehmeti (until 9 August 2022); Giovanni Colella (from 11 August 2022)
- Stadium: Arena e Demave; Elbasan Arena
- Kategoria Superiore: 1st
- Albanian Cup: Quarter-finals
- Europa Conference League: First qualifying round
- Top goalscorer: League: Victor da Silva (13); All: Victor da Silva (14)
Home colours	Away colours

In the 2022–23 season, Partizani Tirana competed in the Kategoria Superiore for the tenth consecutive season. In that season, the club won their 17th championship title, and their first after four years.

== First-team squad ==
Squad at end of season

Note: Flags indicate national team as defined under FIFA eligibility rules; some limited exceptions apply. Players may hold more than one non-FIFA nationality.

No.	Pos.	Nation	Player
3	DF	MKD	David Atanaskoski
4	DF	AUS	Steven Havales
6	FW	KOS	Leart Zekolli
7	MF	BRA	Victor da Silva
8	MF	CGO	Chandrel Massanga
9	FW	MKD	Remzifaik Selmani
10	MF	KOS	Engjëll Hoti
12	GK	ALB	Alban Hoxha (captain)
14	MF	SEN	Maguette Gueye
17	MF	ALB	Bruno Telushi
18	MF	ALB	Henri Zuna
19	FW	ALB	Endri Çelaj
21	MF	ALB	Valentino Murataj
22	FW	ALB	Tedi Cara

No.	Pos.	Nation	Player
23	DF	ALB	Marçelino Preka
24	FW	ALB	Xhafer Hodo
25	FW	GHA	Alfred Mensah
26	DF	ALB	Paulo Buxhelaj
28	DF	ALB	Eljon Sota
31	DF	SVK	Jozef Menich
34	DF	SEN	Saliou Sembene
40	GK	MKD	Bekim Rexhepi
42	FW	ALB	Fabian Shahaj (on loan from ADO Den Haag)
44	DF	ALB	Andi Hadroj
88	DF	MKD	Sabit Bilali
90	FW	NGR	Christian Mba
91	FW	ALB	Klevis Dragaj
99	FW	ALB	Arinaldo Rrapaj (on loan from Ludogorets Razgrad)

=== Out on loan ===
Note: Flags indicate national team as defined under FIFA eligibility rules; some limited exceptions apply. Players may hold more than one non-FIFA nationality.

No.	Pos.	Nation	Player
1	GK	ALB	Aldo Teqja (on loan at Bylis Ballsh)
11	FW	GRE	Dionis Çikani (on loan at Drenica)

No.	Pos.	Nation	Player
19	MF	ALB	Agim Dajçi (on loan at Besa Kavajë)

== Competitions ==
=== Overview ===
Competition	First match	Last match	Starting round	Final position	Record							
Competition	First match	Last match	Starting round	Final position	Pld	W	D	L	GF	GA	GD	Win %
Kategoria Superiore	20 August 2022	29 May 2023	Matchday 1	Winners	36	20	7	9	56	37	+19	55.56
Albanian Cup	28 September 2022	15 March 2023	First round	Quarter-finals	6	4	1	1	10	4	+6	66.67
Europa Conference League	7 July 2022	14 July 2022	First qualifying round	First qualifying round	2	1	0	1	1	1	+0	50.00
Total					44	25	8	11	67	42	+25	56.82

Last updated: 29 May 2023
Source: Competitions

=== Kategoria Superiore ===
==== League table ====
Pos	Team	Pld	W	D	L	GF	GA	GD	Pts	Qualification or relegation
1	Partizani (C)	36	20	7	9	56	37	+19	67 (Note: Head to head points: Partizani 7, Tirana 4)	Qualification for the Champions League first qualifying round
2	Tirana	36	20	7	9	56	33	+23	67	Qualification for the Europa Conference League first qualifying round (Note: Egnatia, the winners of the 2022–23 Albanian Cup, qualified for European competitions based on league position. Therefore, the Europa Conference League berth awarded to the Albanian Cup winners was transferred to the fourth-placed team.)
3	Egnatia	36	14	10	12	46	32	+14	52	Qualification for the Europa Conference League first qualifying round
4	Vllaznia	36	13	11	12	39	37	+2	50	Qualification for the Europa Conference League first qualifying round
5	Laçi	36	14	6	16	45	46	−1	48 (Note: Head to head points: Laçi 12, Teuta 0)	

Source: Albanian Football Association
Rules for classification: 1) Points; 2) Head-to-head points; 3) Head-to-head goal difference; 4) Head-to-head goals scored; 5) Goal difference; 6) Goals scored; 7) Draw.
(C) Champions

==== Results summary ====
Overall								Home						Away					
Pld	W	D	L	GF	GA	GD	Pts	W	D	L	GF	GA	GD	W	D	L	GF	GA	GD
36	20	7	9	56	37	+19	67	11	2	5	28	17	+11	9	5	4	28	20	+8

Last updated: 29 May 2023.
Source: Competitive matches

==== Results by round ====
Round	1	2	3	4	5	6	7	8	9	10	11	12	13	14	15	16	17	18	19	20	21	22	23	24	25	26	27	28	29	30	31	32	33	34	35	36
Ground	H	H	A	H	A	H	A	H	A	A	A	H	A	H	A	H	A	H	H	H	A	H	A	H	A	H	A	A	A	H	A	H	A	H	A	H
Result	W	W	W	L	W	L	W	D	W	L	L	W	D	W	W	L	D	L	D	L	W	W	L	W	D	W	W	D	L	W	W	W	D	W	W	W
Position	3	1	1	1	1	1	1	1	1	1	2	2	2	1	1	1	2	2	2	3	3	2	2	1	2	1	1	2	2	2	2	2	2	2	1	1

Updated to match(es) played on 29 May 2023. Source: Competitive matches
A = Away; H = Home; W = Win; D = Draw; L = Loss

==== Matches ====
20 August 2022 1	Partizani	2–1	Egnatia	Elbasan
19:30 CEST	Hoti 56' (pen.); Skuka 90+8'	Report	Camaj 32'	Stadium: Elbasan Arena; Referee: Eldorjan Hamiti

29 August 2022 2	Partizani	1–0	Laçi	Elbasan
19:30 CEST	Skuka 45' (pen.)	Report		Stadium: Elbasan Arena; Referee: Klodian Shahini

4 September 2022 3	Bylis	0–1	Partizani	Ballsh
15:00 CEST		Report	Skuka 31'	Stadium: Adush Muça Stadium; Referee: Juxhin Xhaja

11 September 2022 4	Partizani	0–1	Erzeni	Elbasan
17:45 CEST		Report	Patrick 12'	Stadium: Elbasan Arena; Referee: Orlando Kuka

19 September 2022 5	Kukësi	1–2	Partizani	Kukës
15:00 CEST	Daci 48'	Report	Cara 14'; Bitri 73'	Stadium: Kukës Arena; Referee: Eldorjan Hamiti

2 October 2022 6	Partizani	0–2	Tirana	Tirana
19:00 CEST		Report	Xhixha 45+1', 69'	Stadium: Arena Kombëtare; Referee: Juxhin Xhaja

7 October 2022 7	Vllaznia	1–2	Partizani	Shkodër
17:45 CEST	Hoxhaj 38'	Report	da Silva 66'; Skuka 86'	Stadium: Loro Boriçi Stadium; Referee: Kreshnik Cjapi

16 October 2022 8	Partizani	0–0	Kastrioti	Elbasan
17:45 CEST		Report		Stadium: Elbasan Arena; Referee: Eldorjan Hamiti

21 October 2022 9	Teuta	1–4	Partizani	Durrës
17:45 CEST	Gruda 11'	Report	Hoti 2', 29'; da Silva 17'; Skuka 75'	Stadium: Niko Dovana Stadium; Referee: Kreshnik Barjamaj

30 October 2022 10	Egnatia	3–0	Partizani	Rrogozhinë
14:00 CET	Medeiros 45+4' (pen.); Zejnullai 45+5', 70'	Report		Stadium: Arena Egnatia; Referee: Enea Jorgji

3 November 2022 11	Laçi	1–0	Partizani	Laç
14:00 CET	Rexhepi 17' (o.g.)	Report		Stadium: Laçi Stadium; Referee: Kreshnik Cjapi

14 November 2022 12	Partizani	2–1	Bylis	Tirana
16:00 CET	Skuka 17' (pen.), 63'	Report	Sousa 80'	Stadium: Arena e Demave; Referee: Erjon Bastari

11 December 2022 13	Erzeni	3–3	Partizani	Durrës
15:45 CET	Patrick 8'; Kadriu 90+2'; Kahrimanović 90+9' (pen.)	Report	Cara 13'; Rrapaj 47'; Skuka 55'	Stadium: Niko Dovana Stadium; Referee: Albert Doda

15 December 2022 14	Partizani	2–1	Kukësi	Tirana
15:45 CET	Bitri 25'; Skuka 30'	Report	Baša 69' (pen.)	Stadium: Arena e Demave; Referee: Kreshnik Cjapi

21 December 2022 15	Tirana	0–1	Partizani	Tirana
20:00 CET		Report	Skuka 4'	Stadium: Arena Kombëtare; Referee: Eldorjan Hamiti

13 January 2023 16	Partizani	1–2	Vllaznia	Tirana
16:00 CET	Gueye 62'	Report	Jonuzi 77'; Çoba 90'	Stadium: Arena e Demave; Referee: Kreshnik Barjamaj

21 January 2023 17	Kastrioti	1–1	Partizani	Kamëz
13:00 CET	Zogaj 66'	Report	Cara 54' (pen.)	Stadium: Kamëz Stadium; Referee: Kreshnik Cjapi

25 January 2023 18	Partizani	0–2	Teuta	Tirana
16:00 CET		Report	Marku 39'; Kallaku 63' (pen.)	Stadium: Arena e Demave; Referee: Laver Alla

30 January 2023 19	Partizani	1–1	Egnatia	Tirana
19:00 CET	Hoti 80'	Report	Dwamena 87'	Stadium: Arena e Demave; Referee: Ardian Beqiri

6 February 2023 20	Partizani	1–2	Laçi	Tirana
16:00 CET	da Silva 28'	Report	Turkaj 45+4'; Shkurti 66'	Stadium: Arena e Demave; Referee: Andi Koçi

13 February 2023 21	Bylis	0–1	Partizani	Ballsh
13:00 CET		Report	Mensah 77'	Stadium: Adush Muça Stadium; Referee: Kreshnik Barjamaj

18 February 2023 22	Partizani	3–0	Erzeni	Tirana
19:00 CET	Rrapaj 45+1'; da Silva 46'; Hoti 71'	Report		Stadium: Arena e Demave; Referee: Laver Alla

24 February 2023 23	Kukësi	1–0	Partizani	Kukës
13:00 CET	Taipi 22'	Report		Stadium: Kukës Arena; Referee: Eldorjan Hamiti

6 March 2023 24	Partizani	2–0	Tirana	Tirana
19:00 CET	Mba 20'; Cara 80'	Report		Stadium: Arena Kombëtare; Referee: Juxhin Xhaja

11 March 2023 25	Vllaznia	1–1	Partizani	Shkodër
17:00 CET	Balaj 8' (pen.)	Report	da Silva 3'	Stadium: Loro Boriçi Stadium; Referee: Florjan Lata

19 March 2023 26	Partizani	4–1	Kastrioti	Tirana
16:00 CET	Cara 35'; Matondo 40'; Selmani 45+2'; Mba 78'	Report	Redon Mihana	Stadium: Arena e Demave; Referee: Andi Koçi

1 April 2023 27	Teuta	0–2	Partizani	Durrës
18:00 CEST		Report	Mba 10'; Hoti 83'	Stadium: Niko Dovana Stadium; Referee: Juxhin Xhaja

10 April 2023 28	Egnatia	1–1	Partizani	Rrogozhinë
15:00 CEST	Zejnullai 90+1'	Report	Mba 23'	Stadium: Arena Egnatia; Referee: Kreshnik Cjapi

16 April 2023 29	Laçi	3–2	Partizani	Laç
15:00 CEST	Guindo 43', 79'; Shkurti 48'	Report	da Silva 39' (pen.); Mba 88'	Stadium: Laçi Stadium; Referee: Juxhin Xhaja

23 April 2023 30	Partizani	2–1	Bylis	Tirana
18:00 CEST	Rrapaj 18'; da Silva 55' (pen.)	Report	Esquerdinha 34'	Stadium: Arena e Demave; Referee: Erjon Bastari

29 April 2023 31	Erzeni	1–2	Partizani	Durrës
18:00 CEST	Kahrimanović 90+9' (pen.)	Report	da Silva 60'; Hoti 86'	Stadium: Niko Dovana Stadium; Referee: Florjan Lata

6 May 2023 32	Partizani	3–1	Kukësi	Tirana
18:00 CEST	da Silva 25' (pen.), 59'; Atanaskoski 29'	Report	Taipi 9'	Stadium: Arena e Demave; Referee: Juxhin Xhaja

17 May 2023 33	Tirana	1–1	Partizani	Tirana
18:30 CEST	Deliu 81'	Report	da Silva 53'	Stadium: Arena Kombëtare; Referee: Kreshnik Cjapi

21 May 2023 34	Partizani	2–1	Vllaznia	Tirana
17:00 CEST	Rrapaj 26'; Sota 33'	Report	Balaj 52'	Stadium: Arena e Demave; Referee: Florjan Lata

25 May 2023 35	Kastrioti	1–4	Partizani	Elbasan
17:00 CEST	Greca 9'	Report	Rrapaj 40'; da Silva 45', 63'; Murataj 58'	Stadium: Elbasan Arena; Referee: Kreshnik Cjapi

29 May 2023 36	Partizani	2–0	Teuta	Tirana
16:00 CEST	Rrapaj 38'; Cara 90+7'	Report		Stadium: Arena e Demave; Referee: Eldorjan Hamiti

=== Albanian Cup ===
==== First round ====
28 September 2022 First leg	Oriku	0−0	Partizani	Tirana
15:00 CEST		Report		Stadium: Arena e Demave; Referee: Geisi Velçani

12 October 2022 Second leg	Partizani	2−0 (2–0 agg.)	Oriku	Elbasan
14:00 CEST	Menich 43'; Skuka 57'	Report		Stadium: Elbasan Arena; Referee: Olti Çela

==== Second round ====
17 January 2023 First leg	Korabi	1−3	Partizani	Peshkopi
13:00 CET	Beshiraj 60'	Report	Skuka 38', 53'; Murataj 80'	Stadium: Korabi Stadium; Referee: Indrit Myrtja

2 February 2023 Second leg	Partizani	3−0 (6–1 agg.)	Korabi	Tirana
13:00 CET	Sota 38'; da Silva 43'; Hoti 62'	Report		Stadium: Arena e Demave; Referee: Silvio Dyrmishi

==== Quarter-finals ====
1 March 2023 First leg	Vllaznia	3−1	Partizani	Shkodër
17:00 CET	Kainã 11', 51'; Çoba 33'	Report	Massanga 44'	Stadium: Loro Boriçi Stadium; Referee: Kreshnik Cjapi

15 March 2023 Second leg	Partizani	1−0 (2–3 agg.)	Vllaznia	Tirana
16:00 CET	Mensah 25'	Report		Stadium: Arena e Demave; Referee: Kreshnik Barjamaj

=== UEFA Europa Conference League ===
==== First qualifying round ====
7 July 2022 First leg	Saburtalo Tbilisi (Georgia (country))	0–1	(Albania) Partizani	Gori, Georgia
18:00		Report	Cara 47'	Stadium: Tengiz Burjanadze Stadium; Attendance: 2,000; Referee: Mohammed Al-Emara (Finland)

14 July 2022 Second leg	Partizani (Albania)	0–1 (a.e.t.) (1–1 agg.) (4–5 p)	(Georgia (country)) Saburtalo Tbilisi	Tirana, Albania
20:00		Report	Sikharulidze 53'	Stadium: Arena Kombëtare; Attendance: 4,178; Referee: Darren England (England)
	Penalties
	Atanaskoski (penalty missed); Bitri (penalty scored); Telushi (penalty scored); Skuka (penalty scored); Rrapaj (penalty missed); Sota (penalty scored); Gueye (penalty missed)		(penalty missed) Jinjolava; (penalty scored) Chaduneli; (penalty scored) Guliashvili; (penalty missed) Nonikashvili; (penalty scored) Sikharulidze; (penalty scored) Gocholeishvili; (penalty scored) G. Mamageishvili
