= 2022–23 Albanian Cup =

Kupa e Shqipërisë

Tournament details
- Country: Albania
- Teams: 34

Final positions
- Champions: Egnatia
- Runners-up: Tirana

Tournament statistics
- Matches played: 63
- Goals scored: 164 (2.6 per match)
- Top goal scorer(s): Patrick (4 goals)

2022–23 Albanian Cup (Albanian: Kupa e Shqipërisë) was the seventy-first season of Albania's annual cup competition, the Albanian Cup. Egnatia won the cup, their first title in the competition.

== Format ==
Ties are played in a two-legged format similar to those of European competitions. If the aggregate score is tied after both games, the match is decided by extra time and a penalty shoot-out, if necessary.

== Preliminary round ==
In order to reduce the number of participating teams for the first round to 32, a preliminary tournament is played. In contrast to the main tournament, the preliminary tournament is held as a single-leg knock-out competition. The matches were played on 15 September 2022.

Team 1	Score	Team 2
Veleçiku (III)	3−0	Murlani (III)
Devolli (III)	5−1	Sopoti (III)

15 September 2022	Veleçiku	3−0	Murlani	Kompleksi Vëllezërit Duli, Koplik
15:00 CEST	Marku 8'; Banushaj 16'; Dibra 70'	Report		Referee: Bekris Dragusha

Veleçiku advanced to the first round.

15 September 2022	Devolli	5−1	Sopoti	Bilisht Stadium, Bilisht
15:00 CEST	Muçollari 10'; Teixeira 23'; Kame 64'; Romero 69'; Ivani 78'	Report	Rreshka 19'	Referee: Rinaldo Abazaj

Devolli advanced to the first round.

== First round ==
All 26 eligible teams of the 2022–23 Kategoria Superiore and 2022–23 Kategoria e Parë will enter in this round along with 8 teams from Kategoria e Dytë. The matches were played on 25, 26, 28 September 2022 as well as 11 and 12 October 2022.

Team 1	Agg.	Team 2	1st leg	2nd leg
Veleçiku (III)	2−5	Tirana (I)	0−3	2−2
Oriku (II)	0−2	Partizani (I)	0−0	0−2
Flamurtari (II)	2−4 (a.e.t.)	Vllaznia (I)	2−1	0−3
Kastrioti (I)	1−0	Vora (III)	1−0	0−0
Butrinti (III)	0−4	Dinamo Tirana (II)	0−1	0−3
Pogradeci (III)	1−10	Bylis (I)	0−3	1−7
Besa (II)	1−4	Korabi (II)	1−1	0−3
Lushnja (II)	4−3 (a.e.t.)	Tërbuni (II)	2−0	2−3
Devolli (III)	0−7	Laçi (I)	0−2	0−5
Labëria (III)	0−5	Kukësi (I)	0−3	0−2
Luzi 2008 (II)	0−2	Teuta (I)	0−0	0−2
Shkumbini (III)	0−6	Egnatia (I)	0−3	0−3
Maliqi (III)	1−8	Skënderbeu (II)	1−5	0−3
Turbina (II)	1−6	Erzeni (I)	1−2	0−4
Besëlidhja (II)	1−2	Apolonia (II)	0−1	1−1
Burreli (II)	2−5 (a.e.t.)	Tomori (II)	2−1	0−4

28 September 2022	Veleçiku	0−3	Tirana	Kompleksi Vëllezërit Duli, Koplik
15:00 CEST		Report	Hila 9'; Berisha 13'; Limaj 86' (pen.)	Referee: Ditmir Grimci

12 October 2022	Tirana	2−2	Veleçiku	Skënder Halili Complex, Tirana
14:00 CEST	Zhivanaj 45+1', 85'	Report	Hajdari 38' (pen.), 40'	Referee: Mirela Çemeri

Tirana advanced to the second round.

28 September 2022	Oriku	0−0	Partizani	Partizani Complex, Tirana
15:00 CEST		Report		Referee: Geisi Velçani

12 October 2022	Partizani	2−0	Oriku	Elbasan Arena, Elbasan
14:00 CEST	Menich 43'; Skuka 57'	Report		Referee: Olti Çela

Partizani advanced to the second round.

26 September 2022	Flamurtari	2−1	Vllaznia	Flamurtari Stadium, Vlorë
15:00 CEST	Fernandinho 20'; Disha 36'	Report	Vulaj 11'	Referee: Olsi Sokoli

12 October 2022	Vllaznia	3−0 (a.e.t.)	Flamurtari	Loro Boriçi Stadium, Shkodër
14:00 CEST	Jurić 41'; Aralica 92'; Kruja 94'	Report		Referee: Adrian Beqiraj

Vllaznia advanced to the second round.

26 September 2022	Kastrioti	1−0	Vora	Redi Maloku Stadium, Fushë-Krujë
15:00 CEST	Ajazi 53'	Report		Referee: Granit Sulko

12 October 2022	Vora	0−0	Kastrioti	Internacional Complex, Pezë Helmës
14:00 CEST		Report		Referee: Ditmir Grimci

Kastrioti advanced to the second round.

28 September 2022	Butrinti	0−1	Dinamo Tirana	Andon Lapa Stadium, Sarandë
13:00 CEST		Report	Silva 56'	Referee: Daniel Haskaj

11 October 2022	Dinamo Tirana	3−0; Awarded	Butrinti	Selman Stërmasi Stadium, Tirana
14:00 CEST

Dinamo Tirana advanced to the second round.

26 September 2022	Pogradeci	0−3	Bylis	Gjorgji Kyçyku Stadium, Pogradec
15:00 CEST		Report	Fall 20'; Lajthia 66'; Atshimene 85'	Referee: Mario Shabanaj

11 October 2022	Bylis	7−1	Pogradeci	Adush Muça Stadium, Ballsh
14:00 CEST	Souza 15', 24', 33' (pen.); Sousa 27' (pen.), 82'; Atshimene 55'; Hodo 89'	Report	Blaçeri 4'	Referee: Ardit Merdanaj

Bylis advanced to the second round.

26 September 2022	Besa	1−1	Korabi	Shkumbini Stadium, Peqin
15:00 CEST	Onuh 44'	Report	Lala 3'	Referee: Mikele Dyrmishi

12 October 2022	Korabi	3−0	Besa	Korabi Stadium, Peshkopi
14:00 CEST	Beshiraj 51', 67'; Tabaku 55'	Report		Referee: Klodian Prenga

Korabi advanced to the second round.

28 September 2022	Lushnja	2−0	Tërbuni	Roza Haxhiu Stadium, Lushnjë
15:00 CEST	Haxhiu 30'; Mehmeti 43'	Report		Referee: Ardit Merdanaj

11 October 2022	Tërbuni	3−2 (a.e.t.)	Lushnja	Internacional Complex, Pezë Helmës
15:00 CEST	Zagani 9'; Xhabrahimi 69'; Hysa 80'	Report	Korreshi 90+4'; Andoni 104'	Referee: Olsi Sokoli

Lushnja advanced to the second round.

26 September 2022	Devolli	0−2	Laçi	Bilisht Stadium, Bilisht
15:00 CEST		Report	Barjamaj 6'; Prengaj 85'	Referee: Erald Demiraj

11 October 2022	Laçi	5−0	Devolli	Internacional Complex, Pezë Helmës
13:00 CEST	Prengaj 23'; Babatunde 36', 71'; Geci 38', 66'	Report		Referee: Besnard Kaimi

Laçi advanced to the second round.

26 September 2022	Labëria	0−3	Kukësi	Labëria Complex, Nartë
15:00 CEST		Report	Daci 7'; Barbosa 44'; Gyasi 51'	Referee: Egli Spahiu

12 October 2022	Kukësi	2−0	Labëria	National Sports Centre, Kamëz
14:00 CEST	Bytyçi 58'; Moraes 75'	Report		Referee: Albano Stolaj

Kukësi advanced to the second round.

26 September 2022	Luzi 2008	0−0	Teuta	Tofik Jashari Stadium, Shijak
15:00 CEST		Report		Referee: Ermal Gryka

11 October 2022	Teuta	2−0	Luzi 2008	Niko Dovana Stadium, Durrës
14:00 CEST	Karabeci 55'; Hebaj 89' (pen.)	Report		Referee: Blerim Ziri

Teuta advanced to the second round.

28 September 2022	Shkumbini	0−3	Egnatia	Shkumbini Stadium, Peqin
15:00 CEST		Report	Bambam 4', 87' (pen.); Camaj 59'	Referee: Xhulian Bacaj

12 October 2022	Egnatia	3−0	Shkumbini	Arena Egnatia, Rrogozhinë
14:00 CEST	Camaj 34', 72'; Jackson 81'	Report		Referee: Sokol Bebja

Egnatia advanced to the second round.

28 September 2022	Maliqi	1−5	Skënderbeu	Skënderbeu Stadium, Korçë
15:00 CEST	Meçollari 85'	Report	Liço 5'; Pusi 15', 51'; Hysolli 60'; Vecaj 89' (pen.)	Referee: Sokol Bebja

12 October 2022	Skënderbeu	3−0	Maliqi	Skënderbeu Stadium, Korçë
14:00 CEST	Beçka 67'; Abubakari 73'; Pecani 80'	Report		Referee: Erald Demiraj

Skënderbeu advanced to the second round.

26 September 2022	Turbina	1−2	Erzeni	Nexhip Trungu Stadium, Cërrik
15:00 CEST	Buxhelaj 50'	Report	Doksani 85'; Patrick 90+4'	Referee: Ervin Kotemelo

12 October 2022	Erzeni	4−0	Turbina	Tofik Jashari Stadium, Shijak
14:00 CEST	Thioub 35'; Enck 51', 74'; Isteri 67'	Report		Referee: Mikele Dyrmishi

Erzeni advanced to the second round.

25 September 2022	Besëlidhja	0−1	Apolonia	Brian Filipi Stadium, Lezhë
15:00 CEST		Report	Umejiego 67'	Referee: Bekris Dragusha

12 October 2022	Apolonia	1−1	Besëlidhja	Loni Papuçiu Stadium, Fier
12:00 CEST	Eneh 40'	Report	Shehu 9'	Referee: Emanuela Rusta

Apolonia advanced to the second round.

28 September 2022	Burreli	2−1	Tomori	Liri Ballabani Stadium, Burrel
15:00 CEST	Ferruku 32' (pen.); Kurbneshi 90'	Report	González 60'	Referee: Endrit Zhuli

12 October 2022	Tomori	4−0 (a.e.t.)	Burreli	Tomori Stadium, Berat
14:00 CEST	Sharavolli 56' (pen.); Olaoye 93', 115'; Alinani 120'	Report		Referee: Xhulio Agolli

Tomori advanced to the second round.

== Second round ==
All the 16 qualified teams from the first round progressed to the second round. The first legs were played on 17 and 18 January 2023 while the second legs took place on 2 and 3 February 2023.

Team 1	Agg.	Team 2	1st leg	2nd leg
Lushnja (II)	0−4	Tirana (I)	0−3	0−1
Korabi (II)	1−6	Partizani (I)	1−3	0−3
Bylis (I)	1−3	Vllaznia (I)	0−2	1−1
Dinamo Tirana (II)	1−3	Kastrioti (I)	1−3	0−0
Tomori (II)	2−5	Laçi (I)	1−3	1−2
Apolonia (II)	0−5	Kukësi (I)	0−0	0−5
Erzeni (I)	1−2	Teuta (I)	1−1	0−1
Skënderbeu (II)	1−2	Egnatia (I)	0−1	1−1

17 January 2023	Lushnja	0−3	Tirana	Roza Haxhiu Stadium, Lushnjë
13:00 CET		Report	Patrick 10', 20'; Hila 23'	Referee: Olsid Ferataj

2 February 2023	Tirana	1−0	Lushnja	Selman Stërmasi Stadium, Tirana
13:00 CET	Lushkja 58'	Report		Referee: Ermal Gryka

Tirana advanced to the quarter finals.

17 January 2023	Korabi	1−3	Partizani	Korabi Stadium, Peshkopi
13:00 CET	Beshiraj 60'	Report	Skuka 38', 53'; Murataj 80'	Referee: Indrit Myrtja

2 February 2023	Partizani	3−0	Korabi	Partizani Complex, Tirana
13:00 CET	Sota 38' da Silva 43'; Hoti 62'	Report		Referee: Silvio Dyrmishi

Partizani advanced to the quarter finals.

17 January 2023	Bylis	0−2	Vllaznia	Adush Muça Stadium, Ballsh
13:00 CET		Report	Jonuzi 36'; Kainã 90+4'	Referee: Silvio Dyrmishi

3 February 2023	Vllaznia	1−1	Bylis	Loro Boriçi Stadium, Shkodër
13:00 CET	Alivoda 86'	Report	Kaçorri 76'	Referee: Daniel Vrapi

Vllaznia advanced to the quarter finals.

17 January 2023	Dinamo Tirana	1−3	Kastrioti	Selman Stërmasi Stadium, Tirana
13:00 CET	Danaj 4'	Report	Hasani 13'; Zogaj 51'; Arapi 90'	Referee: Klodian Shahini

2 February 2023	Kastrioti	0−0	Dinamo Tirana	Redi Maloku Stadium, Fushë-Krujë
13:00 CET		Report		Referee: Bekris Dragusha

Kastrioti advanced to the quarter finals.

17 January 2023	Tomori	1−3	Laçi	Tomori Stadium, Berat
13:00 CET	Ismailaj 83'	Report	Spahiu 39'; Babatunde 50'; Borysiuk 62'	Referee: Daniel Vrapi

2 February 2023	Laçi	2−1	Tomori	Internacional Complex, Pezë Helmës
13:00 CET	Biba 61'; Myrta 83'	Report	Lamçe 90+3'	Referee: Ardit Merdanaj

Laçi advanced to the quarter finals.

18 January 2023	Apolonia	0−0	Kukësi	Loni Papuçiu Stadium, Fier
13:00 CET		Report		Referee: Ermis Çelaj

2 February 2023	Kukësi	5−0	Apolonia	Kukës Arena, Kukës
13:00 CET	Peposhi 17'; Barbosa 49'; Domi 64', 82'; Berisha 67'	Report		Referee: Blerim Ziri

Kukësi advanced to the quarter finals.

18 January 2023	Erzeni	1−1	Teuta	Niko Dovana Stadium, Durrës
16:00 CET	Kapllani 81'	Report	Kapllani 85' (o.g.)	Referee: Juxhin Xhaja

3 February 2023	Teuta	1−0	Erzeni	Niko Dovana Stadium, Durrës
16:00 CET	Gruda 83'	Report		Referee: Kreshnik Barjamaj

Teuta advanced to the quarter finals.

18 January 2023	Skënderbeu	0−1	Egnatia	Skënderbeu Stadium, Korçë
13:00 CET		Report	Paulauskas 90+6'	Referee: Emanuela Rusta

2 February 2023	Egnatia	1−1	Skënderbeu	Arena Egnatia, Rrogozhinë
13:00 CET	Medeiros 54'	Report	Agbekpornu 45+2' (o.g.)	Referee: Andi Koçi

Egnatia advanced to the quarter finals.

== Quarter-finals ==
All eight qualified teams from the second round progressed to the quarter-finals. The first legs were played on 28 February and 1 March 2023 while the second legs took place on 14 and 15 March 2023.

Team 1	Agg.	Team 2	1st leg	2nd leg
Kastrioti (I)	3−6	Tirana (I)	1−4	2−2
Vllaznia (I)	3−2	Partizani (I)	3−1	0−1
Egnatia (I)	3−0	Laçi (I)	0−0	3−0
Teuta (I)	3−2	Kukësi (I)	2−0	1−2

28 February 2023	Kastrioti	1−4	Tirana	Kamëz Stadium, Kamëz
13:00 CET	Selmani 57' (pen.)	Report	Patrick 46', 48'; Berisha 58'; Nikqi 72'	Referee: Klodian Shahini

14 March 2023	Tirana	2−2	Kastrioti	Selman Stërmasi Stadium, Tirana
13:00 CET	Hasani 13' (pen.); Najdovski 23'	Report	Iseni 74' (o.g.); Ajazi 82' (pen.)	Referee: Emanuela Rusta

Tirana advanced to the semi finals.

1 March 2023	Vllaznia	3−1	Partizani	Loro Boriçi Stadium, Shkodër
17:00 CET	Kainã 11', 51'; Çoba 33'	Report	Massanga 44'	Referee: Kreshnik Cjapi

15 March 2023	Partizani	1−0	Vllaznia	Partizani Complex, Tirana
16:00 CET	Mensah 25'	Report		Referee: Kreshnik Barjamaj

Vllaznia advanced to the semi finals.

28 February 2023	Egnatia	0−0	Laçi	Arena Egnatia, Rrogozhinë
13:00 CET		Report		Referee: Adrian Beqiraj

15 March 2023	Laçi	0−3	Egnatia	Laçi Stadium, Laç
13:00 CET		Report	Medeiros 20', 66'; Kasa 54'	Referee: Eldorjan Hamiti

Egnatia advanced to the semi finals.

1 March 2023	Teuta	2−0	Kukësi	Niko Dovana Stadium, Durrës
17:00 CET	Kallaku 59' (pen.), 72'	Report		Referee: Erjon Bastari

14 March 2023	Kukësi	2−1	Teuta	Kukës Arena, Kukës
13:00 CET	Rashiti 49'; Taipi 85' (pen.)	Report	Gruda 29'	Referee: Juxhin Xhaja

Teuta advanced to the semi finals.

== Semi-finals ==
The first legs were played on 26 April while the second legs took place on 10 May 2023.

Team 1	Agg.	Team 2	1st leg	2nd leg
Vllaznia (I)	1−2	Egnatia (I)	1−1	0−1
Tirana (I)	3−0	Teuta (I)	3−0	0−0

26 April 2023	Vllaznia	1−1	Egnatia	Loro Boriçi Stadium, Shkodër
18:00 CEST	Hoxhaj 90+6'	Report	Dwamena 68'	Referee: Kridens Meta

10 May 2023	Egnatia	1−0	Vllaznia	Arena Egnatia, Rrogozhinë
14:00 CEST	Jackson 90'	Report		Referee: Enea Jorgji

Egnatia advanced to the final.

26 April 2023	Tirana	3−0	Teuta	Elbasan Arena, Elbasan
18:00 CEST	Hasani 43'; Lulaj 65'; Lushkja 71'	Report		Referee: Olsid Ferataj

10 May 2023	Teuta	0−0	Tirana	Niko Dovana Stadium, Durrës
17:00 CEST		Report		Referee: Kreshnik Cjapi

Tirana advanced to the final.

== Final ==
1 June 2023
19:00 CEST

Tirana	0−1 (a.e.t.)	Egnatia
	Report	Jackson 114'

Elbasan Arena, Elbasan
Referee: Enea Jorgji
