= 2019–20 Kategoria e Parë =

Kategoria e Parë
- Season: 2019–20
- Champions: Apolonia; 5th title
- Promoted: Apolonia; Kastrioti
- Relegated: Devolli; Iliria; Shënkolli; Shkumbini; Tërbuni
- Matches: 241
- Goals: 604 (2.51 per match)
- Top goalscorer: Klodian Nuri (17 goals)
- Biggest home win: Apolonia 7−0 Elbasani (7 December 2019)
- Biggest away win: Iliria 0−3 Turbina (29 July 2020); Shënkolli 0−3 Turbina (21 June 2020); Tërbuni 0−3 Dinamo Tirana (29 July 2020); Tërbuni 1−4 Veleçiku (7 March 2020); Veleçiku 0−3 Dinamo Tirana (20 June 2020); Veleçiku 0−3 Erzeni (14 September 2019)
- Highest scoring: Apolonia 8−5 Besa (28 June 2020)
- Longest winning run: 6 matches Pogradeci
- Longest unbeaten run: 13 matches Apolonia
- Longest winless run: 10 matches Shënkolli
- Longest losing run: 8 matches Shënkolli

The 2019–20 Kategoria e Parë was the 72nd official season of the Albanian football second-tier since its establishment. The season began on 14 September 2019 and ended on 29 July 2020. There were 20 teams competing this season, split in 2 groups, each with 10 teams. The 2 winners of each group gained promotion to the 2020-21 Kategoria Superiore, and played the division's final against each other. The runners-up of each group played a play-off match between them. The winners of the play-off played another promotion play-off match against the 8th ranked team of the 2019–20 Kategoria Superiore. Apolonia and Kastrioti were promoted to the 2020–21 Kategoria Superiore. Devolli, Iliria, Shënkolli, Shkumbini and Tërbuni were relegated to the 2020–21 Kategoria e Dytë. Apolonia won their fifth Kategoria e Parë title on 22 July 2020 after beating Kastrioti in the final match. The competition was completely suspended from 12 March to 7 June 2020, due to a pandemic of COVID-19 in Albania.

== Changes from last season ==
=== Team changes ===
==== From Kategoria e Parë ====
Promoted to Kategoria Superiore:

- Bylis
- Vllaznia

Relegated to Kategoria e Dytë:

- Tomori
- Vora

==== To Kategoria e Parë ====
Relegated from Kategoria Superiore:

- Kastrioti

Promoted from Kategoria e Dytë:

- Devolli
- Shkumbini
- Tërbuni

=== Locations ===
2019–20 Kategoria e Parë Group A teams.
2019–20 Kategoria e Parë Group B teams.

=== Stadia by capacity and locations ===
==== Group A ====
Team	Location	Stadium	Capacity
Besëlidhja	Lezhë	Brian Filipi Stadium	5,000
Burreli	Burrel	Liri Ballabani Stadium	2,500
Dinamo Tirana	Tirana	Internacional Complex	1,000
Egnatia	Rrogozhinë	Egnatia Stadium	4,000
Erzeni	Shijak	Tofik Jashari Stadium	4,000
Kastrioti	Krujë	Kastrioti Stadium	8,400
Korabi	Peshkopi	Korabi Stadium	6,000
Shkumbini	Peqin	Shkumbini Stadium	5,000
Tërbuni	Pukë	Ismail Xhemali Stadium	1,950
Veleçiku	Koplik	Kompleksi Vellezërit Duli	2,000

==== Group B ====
Team	Location	Stadium	Capacity
Apolonia	Fier	Loni Papuçiu Stadium	6,800
Besa	Kavajë	Besa Stadium	8,000
Devolli	Bilisht	Bilisht Stadium	1,050
Elbasani	Elbasan	Elbasan Arena	12,800
Iliria	Fushë-Krujë	Redi Maloku Stadium	3,000
Lushnja	Lushnjë	Abdurrahman Roza Haxhiu Stadium	8,500
Oriku	Orikum	Petro Ruci Stadium	2,000
Pogradeci	Pogradec	Gjorgji Kyçyku Stadium	10,700
Shënkolli	Shënkoll	Shënkoll Stadium	500
Turbina	Cërrik	Nexhip Trungu Stadium	6,600

== First phase ==
=== Group A ===
Pos	Team	Pld	W	D	L	GF	GA	GD	Pts	Qualification
1	Kastrioti	16	11	4	1	19	4	+15	37	Qualification to the Promotion round
2	Besëlidhja	16	8	4	4	19	12	+7	28	Qualification to the Promotion round
3	Korabi	16	8	1	7	16	15	+1	25	Qualification to the Promotion round
4	Erzeni	16	7	4	5	18	10	+8	25	Qualification to the Promotion round
5	Burreli	16	6	6	4	17	16	+1	24	Qualification to the Relegation round
6	Egnatia	16	4	7	5	14	13	+1	19	Qualification to the Relegation round
7	Tërbuni	16	3	6	7	11	16	−5	15	Qualification to the Relegation round
8	Veleçiku	16	3	4	9	11	22	−11	13	Qualification to the Relegation round
9	Dinamo Tirana	16	3	2	11	9	26	−17	11	Qualification to the Relegation round
10	Shkumbini (Note: Shkumbini was excluded from the league and relegated to the Kategoria e Dytë for the next season, after a violent incident during a match against Dinamo Tirana in the 11th round. They were also deducted 3 points.) (R, D)	0	0	0	0	0	0	0	−3	Excluded from the league

Source: Soccerway
Rules for classification: 1) points; 2) goal difference; 3) number of goals scored; 4) head-to-head points; 5) head-to-head goal difference; 6) draw. (Head-to-head record is applied for clubs with the same number of points only once all matches between said clubs have been played.)
(D) Disqualified; (R) Relegated

=== Group B ===
Pos	Team	Pld	W	D	L	GF	GA	GD	Pts	Qualification
1	Pogradeci	18	12	3	3	30	15	+15	39	Qualification to the Promotion round
2	Apolonia	18	11	4	3	36	14	+22	37	Qualification to the Promotion round
3	Lushnja	18	11	2	5	30	18	+12	35	Qualification to the Promotion round
4	Besa	18	8	3	7	28	24	+4	27	Qualification to the Promotion round
5	Oriku	18	6	6	6	12	15	−3	24	Qualification to the Relegation round
6	Devolli	18	7	3	8	29	30	−1	24	Qualification to the Relegation round
7	Iliria	18	4	6	8	18	23	−5	18	Qualification to the Relegation round
8	Shënkolli	18	3	8	7	17	28	−11	17	Qualification to the Relegation round
9	Turbina	18	4	4	10	14	26	−12	16	Qualification to the Relegation round
10	Elbasani	18	4	1	13	14	35	−21	13	Qualification to the Relegation round

Source: Soccerway
Rules for classification: 1) points; 2) goal difference; 3) number of goals scored; 4) head-to-head points; 5) head-to-head goal difference; 6) draw. (Head-to-head record is applied for clubs with the same number of points only once all matches between said clubs have been played.)

== Second phase ==
=== Promotion round ===
==== Group A ====
Pos	Team	Pld	W	D	L	GF	GA	GD	Pts	Promotion
1	Kastrioti (P)	22	14	5	3	29	13	+16	47	Promotion to 2020–21 Kategoria Superiore
2	Besëlidhja	22	11	6	5	30	19	+11	39	Play-off promotion to 2020–21 Kategoria Superiore
3	Korabi	22	11	3	8	26	22	+4	36	
4	Erzeni	22	7	5	10	25	25	0	26	

Source: Soccerway
Rules for classification: 1) points; 2) goal difference; 3) number of goals scored; 4) head-to-head points; 5) head-to-head goal difference; 6) draw. (Head-to-head record is applied for clubs with the same number of points only once all matches between said clubs have been played.)
(P) Promoted

==== Group B ====
Pos	Team	Pld	W	D	L	GF	GA	GD	Pts	Promotion
1	Apolonia (C, P)	24	15	6	3	55	26	+29	51	Promotion to 2020–21 Kategoria Superiore
2	Pogradeci	24	14	4	6	39	24	+15	46	Play-off promotion to 2020–21 Kategoria Superiore
3	Lushnja	24	14	2	8	42	29	+13	44	
4	Besa	24	9	4	11	42	46	−4	31	

Source: Soccerway
Rules for classification: 1) points; 2) goal difference; 3) number of goals scored; 4) head-to-head points; 5) head-to-head goal difference; 6) draw. (Head-to-head record is applied for clubs with the same number of points only once all matches between said clubs have been played.)
(C) Champions; (P) Promoted

=== Relegation round ===
==== Group A ====
Pos	Team	Pld	W	D	L	GF	GA	GD	Pts	Relegation
5	Egnatia	24	7	10	7	21	19	+2	31	
6	Burreli	24	8	7	9	23	25	−2	31	
7	Dinamo Tirana	24	8	3	13	20	29	−9	27	
8	Veleçiku (O)	24	6	7	11	21	30	−9	25	Play-out relegation to 2020–21 Kategoria e Dytë
9	Tërbuni (Note: Tërbuni was excluded from the league and relegated to the Kategoria e Dytë for the next season, after a violent incident during a match against Egnatia in the 22nd round.) (R, D)	24	5	8	11	20	33	−13	23	Excluded from the league

Source: Soccerway
Rules for classification: 1) points; 2) goal difference; 3) number of goals scored; 4) head-to-head points; 5) head-to-head goal difference; 6) draw. (Head-to-head record is applied for clubs with the same number of points only once all matches between said clubs have been played.)
(D) Disqualified; (O) Play-off winners; (R) Relegated

==== Group B ====
Pos	Team	Pld	W	D	L	GF	GA	GD	Pts	Relegation
5	Oriku	28	11	7	10	22	25	−3	40	
6	Turbina	28	11	5	12	39	35	+4	38	
7	Elbasani	28	12	1	15	42	50	−8	37	
8	Devolli (R)	28	10	4	14	39	43	−4	34	Play-out relegation to 2020–21 Kategoria e Dytë
9	Iliria (R)	28	9	6	13	35	44	−9	33	Relegation to 2020–21 Kategoria e Dytë
10	Shënkolli (R)	28	3	9	16	31	64	−33	18	Relegation to 2020–21 Kategoria e Dytë

Source: Soccerway
Rules for classification: 1) points; 2) goal difference; 3) number of goals scored; 4) head-to-head points; 5) head-to-head goal difference; 6) draw. (Head-to-head record is applied for clubs with the same number of points only once all matches between said clubs have been played.)
(R) Relegated

== Final ==
22 July 2020
19:00

Kastrioti	1−2	Apolonia
Ajazi 40'		Mihana 43'; Ajazi 67' (o.g.)

Elbasan Arena, Elbasan

== Promotion play-off ==
29 July 2020
18:00

Besëlidhja	3−2	Pogradeci
Rrustemaj 14'; Moqi 67'; Čokić 90+4'		Alillari 45+1'; Topllari 51'

Elbasan Arena, Elbasan

Besëlidhja qualified to the final play-off match.

== Relegation play-offs ==
4 August 2020
17:00

Veleçiku	2−1	Maliqi
Shekaj 89'; Zaraj 90+5'		Muçollari 63'

Nexhip Trungu Stadium, Cërrik
Referee: Enea Jorgji

Both teams remained in their respective leagues.

5 August 2020
17:00

Devolli	3−4 (a.e.t.)	Partizani B
Pere 22' (pen.); Ivani 60'; Demollari 66'		Llanaj 2', 113'; Bardhi 7'; Bitri 82'

Elbasan Arena, Elbasan
Referee: Juxhin Xhaja

Partizani B were promoted to the Kategoria e Parë, while Devolli were relegated to the Kategoria e Dytë.

== Season statistics ==
=== Scoring ===
==== Top scorers ====
Rank	Player	Club	Goals
1	(Albania) Klodian Nuri	Elbasani	17
2	(Albania) Mario Gjata	Apolonia	16
2	(Albania) Mikel Canka	Lushnja	16
4	(Albania) Artion Alillari	Pogradeci	12
4	(Brazil) Iran da Conceição	Besa	12
4	(Albania) Xhuliano Skuka	Korabi	12
