= 2026–27 Kategoria Superiore =

Kategoria Superiore
- Season: 2026–27
- Dates: 21 August 2026 – 9 May 2027
- Matches: 60
- Goals: 146 (2.43 per match)
- Top goalscorer: Bernard Karrica (7 goals)
- Biggest home win: Egnatia 5–1 Vora (8 November 2026); Tirana 4–0 Vora (6 September 2026)
- Biggest away win: Dinamo 0–2 Skënderbeu (8 November 2026); Dinamo 0–2 Teuta (16 October 2026); Laçi 0–2 Egnatia (5 September 2026); Laçi 1–3 Teuta (5 September 2026); Partizani 2–4 Dinamo (12 September 2026); Partizani 0–2 Skënderbeu (24 October 2026); Partizani 1–3 Tirana (11 October 2026); Vllaznia 0–2 Teuta (18 September 2026); Vora 1–3 Egnatia (31 August 2026)
- Highest scoring: Egnatia 5–1 Vora (8 November 2026); Partizani 2–4 Dinamo (12 September 2026)
- Longest winning run: 6 matches Teuta
- Longest unbeaten run: 8 matches Teuta
- Longest winless run: 6 matches Partizani; Skënderbeu
- Longest losing run: 6 matches Partizani
- All statistics correct as of 22 November 2026.

The 2026–27 Kategoria Superiore is the 88th official season, or 91st season of top-tier football in Albania (including three unofficial championships during World War II) and the 27th season under the name Kategoria Superiore. The season began on 21 August 2026 and end on 9 May 2027.

The winners of this season's Kategoria Superiore will earn a place in the first qualifying round of the 2027–28 UEFA Champions League, with the second and third placed clubs earning a place in the first qualifying round of the 2027–28 UEFA Conference League.

== Teams ==
Two clubs have earned promotion from the Kategoria e Parë, Laçi (promoted after a one-year absence) and Skënderbeu (promoted after a one-year absence). Bylis (relegated after two years in the top flight) and Flamurtari (relegated after one year in the top flight) were relegated to Kategoria e Parë at the conclusion of last season.

=== Locations ===
2026–27 Kategoria Superiore teams.

Team	Home city	Stadium	Capacity	2025–26 season
Dinamo City	Tirana	Elbasan Arena	12,800	4th
Egnatia	Rrogozhinë	Egnatia Arena	4,267	Champion
Elbasani	Elbasan	Elbasan Arena	12,800	2nd
Laçi	Laç	Laçi Stadium	2,271	Champion (Kategoria e Parë)
Partizani	Tirana	Arena e Demave	3,959	5th
Skënderbeu	Korçë	Skënderbeu Stadium	5,800	Runner-up (Kategoria e Parë)
Teuta	Durrës	Niko Dovana Stadium	12,040	8th
Tirana	Tirana	Selman Stërmasi Stadium	7,308	6th
Vllaznia	Shkodër	Loro Boriçi Stadium	16,022	3rd
Vora	Vorë	Vora Stadium	1,436	7th

=== Stadiums ===
Dinamo City	Egnatia	Elbasani	Laçi	Partizani
Elbasan Arena	Egnatia Arena	Elbasan Arena	Laçi Stadium	Arena e Demave
Capacity: 12,640	Capacity: 4,267	Capacity: 12,640	Capacity: 2,271	Capacity: 3,959
Skënderbeu	Teuta	Tirana	Vllaznia	Vora
Skënderbeu Stadium	Niko Dovana Stadium	Selman Stërmasi Stadium	Loro Boriçi Stadium	Vora Stadium
Capacity: 5,800	Capacity: 12,040	Capacity: 7,308	Capacity: 16,022	Capacity: 1,436

=== Personnel and kits ===
Note: Flags indicate national team as has been defined under FIFA eligibility rules. Players and Managers may hold more than one non-FIFA nationality.

Team	President	Manager	Captain	Kit manufacturer	Shirt sponsor
Dinamo City	(Albania) Adrian Bardhi	(Albania) Ilir Daja	(Albania) Bruno Dita	Kappa	Caffè Pascucci
Egnatia	(Albania) Agim Demrozi	(Albania) Nevil Dede	(Albania) Albano Aleksi	Magma	Demrozi Construction
Elbasani	(Albania) Kujtim Llupa	(Albania) Glen Daja	(Albania) Bruno Lulaj	Kappa	Lori Caffe
Laçi	(Albania) Pashk Laska	(North Macedonia) Qatip Osmani	(Albania) Arlind Kurti	Macron	DigitAlb
Partizani	(Albania) Gazmend Demi	(Bosnia and Herzegovina) Mislav Karoglan	(Albania) Xhuliano Skuka	Joma	
Skënderbeu	(Albania) Ardian Takaj	(Albania) Julian Ahmataj	(Ghana) Bismark Charles	Cohl's	ABI Bank
Teuta	(Albania) Fatos Troplini	(Albania) Edlir Tetova	(Albania) Artan Jazxhi	Macron	
Tirana	(Albania) Refik Halili	(Croatia) Dean Klafurić	(Albania) Redon Xhixha	Joma	Lajthiza
Vllaznia	(Albania) Alban Xhaferi	(Hungary) Csaba László	(Albania) Bekim Balaj	Suzmar	SIGAL
Vora	(Albania) Albert Xhabafti	(Albania) Arjan Bellaj	(Albania) Mario Barjamaj	Macron	Your Space

=== Managerial changes ===
Team	Outgoing manager	Manner of departure	Date of vacancy	Position in table	Incoming manager	Date of appointment
Laçi	(Kosovo) Naci Şensoy	End of contract	4 May 2026	Pre-season	(North Macedonia) Qatip Osmani	30 June 2026
Skënderbeu	(Albania) Ernest Gjoka	End of contract	4 May 2026	Pre-season	(Albania) Julian Ahmataj	1 July 2026
Tirana	(Albania) Orges Shehi	End of contract	10 May 2026	Pre-season	(Croatia) Dean Klafurić	3 July 2026
Partizani	(Albania) Realf Zhivanaj (caretaker)	End of caretaker spell	10 May 2026	Pre-season	(Romania) Florin Bratu	6 July 2026
Teuta	(Albania) Bledar Hodo (caretaker)	End of caretaker spell	16 May 2026	Pre-season	(Albania) Edlir Tetova	29 May 2026
Vllaznia	(Albania) Edi Martini	Sacked	1 October 2026	10th	(Hungary) Csaba László	2 October 2026
Partizani	(Romania) Florin Bratu	Sacked	12 October 2026	9th	(Bosnia and Herzegovina) Mislav Karoglan	15 October 2026
Elbasani	(Serbia) Ivan Gvozdenović	Resigned	18 October 2026	6th	(Albania) Glen Daja	21 October 2026

== League table ==
Pos	Team	Pld	W	D	L	GF	GA	GD	Pts	Qualification or relegation
1	Egnatia	12	9	0	3	25	11	+14	27	Qualification for the Championship round
2	Teuta	12	7	2	3	15	5	+10	23	Qualification for the Championship round
3	Skënderbeu	12	4	5	3	14	12	+2	17	Qualification for the Championship round
4	Dinamo City	12	5	2	5	15	15	0	17	Qualification for the Championship round
5	Elbasani	12	4	5	3	14	13	+1	17	Qualification for the Championship round
6	Tirana	12	4	4	4	15	15	0	16	Qualification for the Championship round
7	Vllaznia	12	4	3	5	13	16	−3	15	Qualification for the Relegation round
8	Vora	12	3	4	5	13	21	−8	13	Qualification for the Relegation round
9	Laçi	12	3	2	7	10	16	−6	11	Qualification for the Relegation round
10	Partizani	12	3	1	8	12	22	−10	10	Qualification for the Relegation round

Updated to match(es) played on 22 November 2026. Source: Albanian Football Association
Rules for classification: 1) Points; 2) Head-to-head points; 3) Head-to-head goal difference; 4) Head-to-head goals scored; 5) Goal difference; 6) Goals scored; 7) Draw.

== Results ==
Clubs will play each other four times for a total of 36 matches each.

=== First half of season ===
Home \ Away	DIN	EGN	ELB	LAÇ	PAR	SKË	TEU	TIR	VLL	VOR
Dinamo	—	2–1	2–1	3–1		0–2	0–2	a		0–1
Egnatia		—			2–1	2–1	1–0	3–0	3–1	5–1
Elbasani	1–0	2–1	—	2–1	2–1				1–1	1–1
Laçi		0–2	1–1	—	0–1		1–3		2–0	1–0
Partizani	2–4			1–2	—	0–2	0–0	1–3	0–1	
Skënderbeu	0–1	1–0	2–1	1–1		—		1–1	1–1	
Teuta			0–0	1–0	0–1	2–0	—	3–1		2–0
Tirana	1–1	1–2	2–2	1–0	a		1–0	—		4–0
Vllaznia	1–0		1–0		2–3	2–2	0–2	2–0	—	
Vora	2–2	1–3			4–1	1–1		0–0	2–1	—

Updated to match(es) played on 22 November 2026. Source: Albanian Football Association
Legend: Blue = home team win; Yellow = draw; Red = away team win.

=== Second half of season ===
Home \ Away	DIN	EGN	ELB	LAÇ	PAR	SKË	TEU	TIR	VLL	VOR
Dinamo	—							a		
Egnatia		—								
Elbasani			—							
Laçi				—						
Partizani					—			a		
Skënderbeu						—				
Teuta							—			
Tirana	a				a			—		
Vllaznia									—	
Vora										—

First match(es) will be played: 2027. Source: Albanian Football Association
Legend: Blue = home team win; Yellow = draw; Red = away team win.

== Season statistics ==
=== Scoring ===
==== Top scorers ====
As of 21 November 2026

Rank	Player	Club	Goals
1	(Albania) Bernard Karrica	Vora	7
2	(Albania) Atdhe Mazari	Elbasani	6
2	(Ghana) Bismark Charles	Skënderbeu	6
4	(Belgium) Alessandro Albanese	Egnatia	5
4	(Albania) Ardit Nikaj	Elbasani	5
4	(Albania) Bekim Balaj	Vllaznia	5
4	(Portugal) Pedro Martelo	Teuta	5
4	(Albania) Redon Xhixha	Tirana	5

=== Hat-tricks ===
Player	Club	Against	Result	Date
(Albania) Bernard Karrica	Vora	Partizani	4–1 (H)	18 October 2026

Notes

(H) – Home team
(A) – Away team

== Notes and references ==
1. Dinamo City is playing their 2026–27 home games at the Elbasan Arena in Elbasan.
