= Ysni Ismaili =

Albanian footballer

Personal information
- Date of birth: 13 March 2002 (age 24)
- Place of birth: Bitola, North Macedonia
- Height: 1.75 m (5 ft 9 in)
- Position: Right-back

Team information
- Current team: Dinamo City
- Number: 2

Youth career
- 2018–2020: Pelister

Senior career*
Years	Team	Apps	(Gls)
2020–2022	Pelister	24	(0)
2022–2023	Voska Sport		
2023	Karaorman		
2023–2024	Vora	54	(2)
2024	→ Vora U21	2	(1)
2024–	Dinamo City	20	(0)

International career^{‡}
2018	Albania U17	3	(0)
2019	Albania U18	4	(0)
2021	Albania U20	2	(0)
2023–2024	Albania U21	4	(0)
- * Club domestic league appearances and goals as of 25 June 2026 ‡ National team caps and goals as of 15 August 2025

Ysni Ismaili (born 13 March 2002) is a professional footballer who plays as a right-back for Albanian club Dinamo City. Born in North Macedonia, he plays for the Albania national team.

== Club career ==
=== Early career ===
Ismaili began his senior career with Pelister in 2020, making 24 league appearances over two seasons.

On 16 February 2022, he joined Voska Sport on a one-year contract, having previously played for Pelister.

On 15 February 2023, Ismaili joined Karaorman from Voska Sport.

=== Vora ===
He moved to Albanian club Vora on 1 July 2023, where he spent the following two seasons; during the 2023–24 season, he made 28 appearances in the Kategoria e Parë and scored once, and remained with the club for the following season, recording 26 league appearances and another goal, as Vora secured promotion to the Kategoria Superiore by winning the 2024–25 league title.

He left the club and joined fello Kategoria Superiore side Dinamo City.

Ismaili made eight appearances in the 2026–27 UEFA Conference League qualifying rounds, playing 695 minutes and recording one assist, while receiving two yellow cards.

== International career ==
Ismaili received his first call-up to the senior Albania national team for the 2026–27 UEFA Nations League matches against Finland and Belarus on 12 and 15 November 2026, respectively.

== Career statistics ==
=== Club ===
As of 15 August 2025

Club	Season	League			Cup		Europe		Total	
Club	Season	Division	Apps	Goals	Apps	Goals	Apps	Goals	Apps	Goals
Vora	2023–24	Kategoria e Parë	28	1	1	0	—		29	1
Vora	2024–25	Kategoria e Parë	26	1	1	1	—		27	2
Career total			54	2	2	1	—		56	3

== Honours ==
=== Club ===
Vora

- Kategoria e Parë: 2024–25

Dinamo City

- Albanian Cup: 2025–26
- Albanian Supercup: 2025
