= 2023–24 Kategoria e Parë =

Kategoria e Parë
- Season: 2023–24
- Champions: Elbasani; 1st title
- Promoted: Elbasani; Bylis
- Relegated: Luzi 2008; Tomori
- Matches: 198
- Goals: 517 (2.61 per match)
- Top goalscorer: Peter Itodo (19 goals)
- Biggest home win: Elbasani 5−0 Tomori (4 May 2024)
- Biggest away win: Besa 0−5 Elbasani (9 March 2024)
- Highest scoring: Besa 4−3 Lushnja (13 September 2023); Elbasani 5−2 Luzi 2008 (17 February 2024); Lushnja 4−3 Vora (28 March 2024)
- Longest winning run: 6 matches Bylis
- Longest unbeaten run: 25 matches Elbasani
- Longest winless run: 13 matches Tomori
- Longest losing run: 10 matches Tomori

The 2023–24 Kategoria e Parë was the 76th official season of the Albanian football second-tier since its establishment. The season began on 2 September 2023 and ended on 9 May 2024. There were 12 teams competing this season. The winning and runner-up teams gained promotion to the 2024–25 Kategoria Superiore. The promotion play-offs winner will play a promotion play-off match against the 8th ranked team of the 2023–24 Kategoria Superiore. Bylis and Elbasani were promoted to the 2024–25 Kategoria Superiore. Luzi 2008 and Tomori were relegated to the 2024–25 Kategoria e Dytë.

== Changes from last season ==
=== Team changes ===
==== From Kategoria e Parë ====
Promoted to Kategoria Superiore:

- Dinamo Tirana
- Skënderbeu

Relegated to Kategoria e Dytë:

- Besëlidhja
- Oriku
- Tërbuni
- Turbina

==== To Kategoria e Parë ====
Relegated from Kategoria Superiore:

- Bylis
- Kastrioti

Promoted from Kategoria e Dytë:

- Elbasani
- Vora

== Locations ==
2023–24 Kategoria e Parë teams.

=== Stadia by capacity and locations ===
Team	Location	Stadium	Capacity
Apolonia	Fier	Loni Papuçiu Stadium	6,800
Besa	Kavajë	Luz i Vogël Stadium	600
Burreli	Burrel	Liri Ballabani Stadium	3,000
Bylis	Ballsh	Adush Muça Stadium	5,200
Elbasani	Elbasan	Elbasan Arena	12,800
Flamurtari	Vlorë	Flamurtari Stadium	8,200
Kastrioti	Krujë	Redi Maloku Stadium	3,000
Korabi	Peshkopi	Korabi Stadium	6,000
Lushnja	Lushnjë	Roza Haxhiu Stadium	8,500
Luzi 2008	Luz i Vogël	Luz i Vogël Stadium	600
Tomori	Berat	Tomori Stadium	19,230
Vora	Vorë	Vora Stadium	

== League table ==
Pos	Team	Pld	W	D	L	GF	GA	GD	Pts	Promotion or relegation
1	Elbasani (C, P)	33	24	7	2	76	32	+44	79	Promotion to 2024–25 Kategoria Superiore
2	Bylis (P)	33	22	5	6	55	31	+24	71	Promotion to 2024–25 Kategoria Superiore
3	Flamurtari	33	16	10	7	46	29	+17	58	Promotion play-off to 2024–25 Kategoria Superiore
4	Vora	33	15	5	13	61	50	+11	50	Promotion play-off to 2024–25 Kategoria Superiore
5	Apolonia	33	12	10	11	44	31	+13	46	Promotion play-off to 2024–25 Kategoria Superiore
6	Korabi	33	12	8	13	42	38	+4	44	Promotion play-off to 2024–25 Kategoria Superiore
7	Kastrioti	33	10	10	13	43	47	−4	40	
8	Burreli	33	12	4	17	28	43	−15	40	
9	Lushnja (O)	33	10	8	15	38	53	−15	38	Relegation play-out to 2024–25 Kategoria e Dytë
10	Besa (O)	33	10	8	15	34	47	−13	38	Relegation play-out to 2024–25 Kategoria e Dytë
11	Luzi 2008 (R)	33	9	4	20	41	56	−15	31	Relegation to 2024–25 Kategoria e Dytë
12	Tomori (R)	33	4	5	24	21	72	−51	17	Relegation to 2024–25 Kategoria e Dytë

Rules for classification: 1) Points; 2) Head-to-head points; 3) Head-to-head goal difference; 4) Head-to-head goals scored; 5) Goal difference; 6) Goals scored; 7) Draw.
(C) Champions; (O) Play-off winners; (P) Promoted; (R) Relegated

=== Rounds 1–22 ===
Home \ Away	APO	BES	BUR	BYL	ELB	FLA	KAS	KOR	LUS	LUZ	TOM	VOR
Apolonia	—	1–1	3–0	0–1	0–1	1–1	1–1	2–2	4–1	1–0	4–1	2–1
Besa	0–0	—	0–0	0–2	0–1	1–2	1–1	0–1	4–3	2–0	2–0	0–1
Burreli	1–0	4–1	—	1–2	0–1	1–0	0–0	1–0	0–2	1–5	2–0	0–0
Bylis	3–1	0–0	1–0	—	0–0	2–0	3–1	1–0	1–0	3–1	1–1	2–0
Elbasani	3–2	2–0	2–0	2–2	—	1–1	3–1	2–1	3–2	5–2	4–0	3–2
Flamurtari	0–0	0–0	4–2	0–1	2–1	—	1–0	2–0	3–0	2–1	1–0	2–1
Kastrioti	1–1	3–1	0–0	2–1	1–1	0–0	—	1–0	1–1	1–0	3–1	2–3
Korabi	0–1	2–0	1–0	2–1	2–1	0–1	3–2	—	1–0	0–0	4–0	1–2
Lushnja	0–3	2–1	2–0	0–2	0–1	0–4	3–1	0–0	—	2–1	2–2	2–1
Luzi 2008	0–3	0–2	2–0	1–2	2–4	1–1	3–1	0–0	1–2	—	2–0	0–1
Tomori	2–1	2–2	0–1	0–2	1–3	1–4	1–0	0–0	0–0	1–0	—	0–1
Vora	1–0	4–2	3–1	2–3	1–1	3–1	4–2	1–0	2–2	3–1	5–1	—

Legend: Blue = home team win; Yellow = draw; Red = away team win.
For upcoming matches, an "a" indicates there is an article about the rivalry between the two participants.

=== Rounds 23–33 ===
Home \ Away	APO	BES	BUR	BYL	ELB	FLA	KAS	KOR	LUS	LUZ	TOM	VOR
Apolonia		0–1		4–1			2–0	1–1			2–1	2–1
Besa					0–5	1–0	3–2	0–0		4–1		
Burreli	2–1	0–1		1–0					2–0			2–1
Bylis		2–0			2–3	4–2	2–0	3–2			2–1	
Elbasani	1–0		3–0						3–1	2–1	5–0	2–0
Flamurtari	0–0		0–1		2–2				0–0	1–0	3–1	
Kastrioti			3–1		2–2	0–2		4–2		1–0		
Korabi			2–3		2–3	1–1			2–1	5–1	2–1	
Lushnja	1–1	2–0		1–2			0–0					4–3
Luzi 2008	1–0		2–1	3–1					4–0			3–3
Tomori		1–4	1–0				0–3		0–2	1–2		
Vora		3–0		0–0		2–3	1–3	2–3			3–0	

Legend: Blue = home team win; Yellow = draw; Red = away team win.
For upcoming matches, an "a" indicates there is an article about the rivalry between the two participants.

=== Positions by round ===
The table lists the positions of teams after each week of matches.

Team ╲ Round	1	2	3	4	5	6	7	8	9	10	11	12	13	14	15	16	17	18	19	20	21	22	23	24	25	26	27	28	29	30	31	32	33
Elbasani	4	3	2	1	1	2	2	3	2	2	2	2	2	2	2	2	1	1	2	2	2	2	2	1	1	1	1	1	1	1	1	1	1
Bylis	3	2	3	2	2	1	1	1	1	1	1	1	1	1	1	1	2	2	1	1	1	1	1	2	2	2	2	2	2	2	2	2	2
Flamurtari	5	8	8	7	5	5	4	4	5	5	4	4	4	3	4	4	4	4	4	4	4	4	4	4	3	3	3	3	3	3	3	3	3
Vora	2	5	4	5	4	3	5	5	3	3	5	5	5	5	3	3	3	3	3	3	3	3	3	3	4	4	4	4	4	4	4	4	4
Apolonia	1	1	1	4	3	4	3	2	4	4	3	3	3	4	5	5	5	5	5	5	5	5	5	5	5	5	5	5	5	5	5	5	5
Korabi	8	11	10	6	8	7	8	6	6	6	6	6	6	6	6	6	6	6	6	6	6	6	6	6	6	6	6	6	6	6	6	6	6
Kastrioti	6	7	7	9	7	8	7	8	9	10	8	8	8	8	8	8	9	9	10	10	9	8	9	9	9	9	9	9	10	8	7	7	7
Burreli	10	10	11	12	12	9	10	11	11	8	9	9	9	9	9	9	8	8	8	8	8	9	8	7	8	8	8	8	9	9	9	8	8
Lushnja	12	12	12	10	10	10	9	9	7	7	7	7	7	7	7	7	7	7	7	7	7	7	7	8	7	7	7	7	7	7	8	9	9
Besa	11	6	6	8	9	11	11	10	10	11	10	10	10	10	10	11	10	11	9	9	10	10	10	10	11	10	10	10	8	10	10	10	10
Luzi 2008	7	9	9	11	11	12	12	12	12	12	12	12	12	12	12	10	11	12	12	12	12	11	11	11	10	11	11	11	11	11	11	11	11
Tomori	9	4	5	3	6	6	6	7	8	9	11	11	11	11	11	12	12	10	11	11	11	12	12	12	12	12	12	12	12	12	12	12	12

Leader and promotion to 2024−25 Kategoria Superiore
Promotion to 2024−25 Kategoria Superiore
Promotion play-off
Relegation play-off
Relegation to 2024–25 Kategoria e Dytë

== Promotion play-offs ==
=== Bracket ===
Semi-finals
Flamurtari	0
Korabi	0
Vora	3
Apolonia	4

Final
Flamurtari (a.e.t.)	0 (4)
Apolonia	0 (3)

=== Semi-finals ===
12 May 2024
15:00

Flamurtari	0−0	Korabi

Flamurtari Stadium, Vlorë
Referee: Adrian Beqiraj

Flamurtari qualified to the final as the team with the higher ranking.

12 May 2024
15:00

Vora	3−4	Apolonia
Prengaj 31', 44'; Raboshta 49' (pen.)		Hebeja 22'; Maksuti 68'; Omeri 72'; Umejiego 81'

Vora Stadium, Vorë
Referee: Silvio Dyrmishi

=== Final ===
15 May 2024
16:00

Flamurtari	0−0 (a.e.t.)	Apolonia
Penalties
Shkurtaj (penalty scored); Ramadani (penalty scored); Deliaj (penalty scored); Oliveira (penalty missed); Teqja (penalty scored)	4−3	(penalty scored) Omeri; (penalty missed) Injehu; (penalty missed) Shanaj; (penalty scored) Asllanaj; (penalty scored) Harizaj

Elbasan Arena, Elbasan
Referee: Florjan Lata

Flamurtari qualified to the final play-off match.

== Relegation play-offs ==
16 May 2024
16:00

Lushnja	2−0	Iliria
Kasmollari 4'; Dragoj 90'

Egnatia Arena, Rrogozhinë
Referee: Enea Jorgji

16 May 2024
16:00

Besa	3−1	Luftëtari
Emini 7'; Dabo 32'; Spahiu 55'		Ziaj 49'

Flamurtari Stadium, Vlorë
Referee: Olsid Ferataj

== Top scorers ==
Rank	Player	Club	Goals
1	(Nigeria) Peter Itodo	Luzi 2008	19
2	(Albania) Bedri Greca	Elbasani	18
3	(Albania) Jasmin Raboshta	Vora	16
4	(Albania) Dejvid Kapllani	Kastrioti	14
4	(Albania) Patrik Treni	Luzi 2008	14
6	(Albania) Fatmir Prengaj	Vora	13
7	(Albania) Arsen Lleshi	Elbasani	12

== Notes and references ==
=== Notes ===
1. Besa will play their 2023–24 home games at the Luz i Vogël Stadium in Luz i Vogël, since their venue, Besa Stadium, is not suitable for Kategoria e Parë matches.
2. Kastrioti will play their 2023–24 home games at the Redi Maloku Stadium in Fushë-Krujë, since their venue, Kastrioti Stadium, is not suitable for Kategoria e Parë matches.
