= Artion =

Artion is an Albanian given name. Notable people with the name include:

- Artion Alillari (born 1995), Albanian professional footballer
- Artion Poçi (born 1977), Albanian former footballer
