= Klodian Nuri =

Albanian footballer

Personal information
- Date of birth: 23 July 1995 (age 31)
- Place of birth: Tirana, Albania
- Height: 1.80 m (5 ft 11 in)
- Position: Forward

Youth career
- 2011–2014: Shkëndija Tiranë

Senior career*
| Years | Team | Apps | (Gls) |
| 2014–2015 | Besa | 16 | (2) |
| 2015 | Kastrioti | 9 | (0) |
| 2016 | Besa | 5 | (0) |
| 2017–2018 | Partizani B | 33 | (5) |
| 2018 | Vora | 11 | (1) |
| 2019–2021 | Elbasani | 45 | (20) |
| 2021 | Oriku | 15 | (4) |
| 2021–2022 | Turbina | 1 | (0) |
| 2022–2023 | Lushnja | 17 | (3) |
| 2023–2024 | Korabi | 5 | (1) |

International career^{‡}
| 2009 | Albania U15 | 2 | (0) |
- * Club domestic league appearances and goals as of 11 November 2023 ‡ National team caps and goals as of 19 October 2009

Klodian Nuri (born 23 July 1995) is an Albanian former footballer who last played as a forward for Kategoria e Parë club Korabi.

== Honours ==
Individual

- Kategoria e Parë Golden Shoe: 2019–20
