= Dajan Shehi =

Albanian footballer

Personal information
- Date of birth: 19 March 1997 (age 29)
- Place of birth: Elbasan, Albania
- Height: 1.91 m (6 ft 3 in)
- Position: Centre-back

Team information
- Current team: Vora
- Number: 33

Youth career
- 2012–2015: Elbasani
- 2015–: Teuta Durrës

Senior career*
Years	Team	Apps	(Gls)
2015	Elbasani	2	(0)
2015–2019	Teuta Durrës	9	(0)
2017	→ Besa Kavajë (loan)	13	(2)
2018	→ Hajduk Split II (loan)	1	(0)
2018−2019	→ Kastrioti (loan)	18	(0)
2019–2021	Vllaznia Shkodër	53	(2)
2021–2022	Partizani Tirana	6	(0)
2022	Skënderbeu Korçë	15	(0)
2022–2023	Vllaznia Shkodër	22	(0)
2023–2024	Gjilani	22	(0)
2024–	Vora	61	(4)
- * Club domestic league appearances and goals as of 13 May 2026

Dajan Shehi (born 19 March 1997) is an Albanian professional footballer who plays as a centre-back for Albanian club Vora.

== Club career ==
=== Early career ===
Shehi started his youth career aged 15 with KF Elbasani in September 2012. In his first 2012–13 season with under-17 side he played 9 matches. In the next season he managed to appear for both under-17 & under-19 side playing 21 matches and scoring 1 goal for U17 and 6 matches for U19.

=== Elbasani ===
During the 2014–15 season he gained entry with the first team and made his debut on 17 May 2015 against Laçi playing the full 90-minutes match which finished in the 2–0 loss. He played another match for Elbasani and moved to Teuta Durrës during the Window Summer Transfers.

=== Teuta Durrës ===
He made it his debut for Teuta Durrës against Ada Velipojë on 16 September 2015, valid for the 2015–16 Albanian Cup, coming on as a substitute in the 60th minute in place of Nertil Ferraj, where the match finished in the 1–5 victory.

== International career ==
He was called up for the first time at international level in the Albania national under-19 football team by coach Arjan Bellaj for two friendly matches against Kosovo U19 on 13 & 15 October 2015.

== Career statistics ==
=== Club ===
As of 17 February 2016

Season	Club	League country	League		League Cup		Europe		Total	
Season	Club	League country	Apps	Goals	Apps	Goals	Apps	Goals	Apps	Goals
2014–15	Elbasani	Albanian Superliga	2	0	-	-	-	-	2	0
Total			2	0	0	0	0	0	2	0
2015–16	Teuta Durrës	Albanian Superliga	1	0	2	0	-	-	3	0
Total			1	0	2	0	0	0	3	0
Career total			3	0	2	0	0	0	5	0
