= Fatmir Prengaj =

Albanian footballer

Personal information
- Date of birth: 1 May 2001 (age 25)
- Place of birth: Mamurras, Albania
- Height: 1.80 m (5 ft 11 in)
- Position: Forward

Team information
- Current team: Vora
- Number: 20

Youth career
- Laçi

Senior career*
Years	Team	Apps	(Gls)
2018–2023	Laçi	42	(2)
2022	→ Erzeni (loan)	15	(5)
2023	→ Vora (loan)	13	(5)
2023–2024	Vora	32	(15)
2024–2025	Tirana	28	(2)
2026–	Vora	9	(0)

International career
2019	Albania U19	3	(0)
2021	Albania U21	2	(0)
- * Club domestic league appearances and goals as of 13 May 2026

Fatmir Prengaj (born 1 May 2001) is an Albanian professional footballer who plays as a forward for Vora.

== Club career ==
Prengaj made his first-team debut during the first leg of an Albanian Cup first-round matchup against Naftëtari on 12 September 2018, and scored his first goal in the 9–0 second-leg victory two weeks later. He went on to make his Kategoria Superiore debut on 28 October, replacing Elvi Berisha in the final minutes of a 1–0 defeat to Kukësi.

Prengaj was loaned out to Erzeni in 2022.

== International career ==
Prengaj played for the Albania U19s in 2019. He later appeared for the Albania U21s in 2023 UEFA European Under-21 Championship qualifiers.

== Career statistics ==
=== Club ===
As of 2 February 2020.

Club	Season	League			Cup		Continental		Other		Total	
Club	Season	Division	Apps	Goals	Apps	Goals	Apps	Goals	Apps	Goals	Apps	Goals
Laçi	2018–19	Kategoria Superiore	4	0	3 (Note: Appearances in the Albanian Cup)	1	–		0	0	7	1
Laçi	2019–20	Kategoria Superiore	3	0	0	0	–		0	0	3	0
Career total			7	0	3	1	0	0	0	0	10	1
