= Elis Doksani =

Albanian footballer

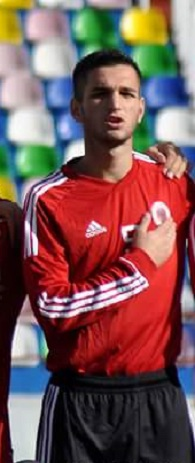
- Elis Doksani with Albania U19 during the 2016 UEFA European Under-19 Championship qualification in Tbilisi, Georgia

Personal information
- Full name: Elis Doksani
- Date of birth: 5 July 1998 (age 28)
- Place of birth: Fier, Albania
- Height: 1.88 m (6 ft 2 in)
- Position: Defender

Team information
- Current team: KF Lushnja
- Number: 5

Youth career
- 2011–2015: Tirana
- 2014–2015: Partizani Tirana
- 2015: Tirana

Senior career*
Years	Team	Apps	(Gls)
2015–2016	Bylis Ballsh	1	(0)
2016–2017	Partizani Tirana	1	(0)
2017–2018	Dinamo Tirana	26	(0)
2018–2019	Bylis Ballsh	13	(0)
2019–2020	Egnatia	6	(0)
2021–2022	Turbina Cerrik	18	(1)
2022	Erzeni Shijak	0	(0)
2023–	Lushnja	6	(0)

International career^{‡}
2015–2016	Albania U-19	5	(0)
- * Club domestic league appearances and goals as of 20 May 2023 ‡ National team caps and goals as of 11 October 2016

Elis Doksani (born 5 July 1998) is an Albanian professional footballer who plays as a defender for the Albanian club Lushnja.

== Club career ==
=== Early career ===
Doksani started his youth career at KF Tirana in 2011. He was loaned to FK Partizani Tirana for a half season and was returned to KF Tirana. Then he moved to KF Bylis Ballsh

=== Bylis Ballsh ===
Doksani started his professional career at KF Bylis Ballsh in 2015 when he was only 17. He played for 1 year at Bylis Ballsh. His debut in the Albanian Superliga as a professional football player came on 12 December 2015, when his team Bylis Ballsh draw against Partizani Tirana. He played 90 minutes in that game being one of the best in the match.

=== FK Partizani Tirana ===
In August 2016 Doksani signed with a FK Partizani Tirana and during the 2016–17 season he played for under-19 side featuring in 22 matches where he scored also 1 goal and was part of Partizani Tirana B in 3 matches playing 2 full 90-minutes. He played also a cup match for the first team. At this time he was only 18 years old.

== International career ==
=== Albania U19 ===
Doksani was called up at the Albania national under-19 football team by coach Arjan Bellaj to participate in the 2016 UEFA European Under-19 Championship qualification from 12 to 17 November 2015. Doksani played in all 3 matches as full 90-minutes, against Austria U19 in a 2–1 loss, Georgia U19 in another 1–0 loss and Wales U19 in a 3–2 win which resulted an elimination from the tournament for Albania U19 as they were ranked in the 3rd out 4 place collecting 1 win, 2 losses and a total of 4-5 goals collected.

Doksani was recalled at the Albania national under-19 football team by same coach Arjan Bellaj to participate in another qualification campaign, the 2017 UEFA European Under-19 Championship qualification from 6–11 October 2016. He played two full 90-minute in 2 first matches against Republic of Ireland U19 in a 1–0 loss and Germany U19 in a 3–2 loss and was an unused substitute in the closing match against Gibraltar U19.
