= Erald Maksuti =

Albanian footballer (born 2004)

Personal information
- Date of birth: 10 May 2004 (age 22)
- Place of birth: Shkodër, Albania
- Height: 1.82 m (6 ft 0 in)
- Position: Forward

Team information
- Current team: Akhmat Grozny
- Number: 76

Youth career
- 2013–2014: Bërdica
- 2018–2020: Brians
- 2020–2025: Apolonia Fier

Senior career*
Years	Team	Apps	(Gls)
2021–2025	Apolonia Fier	75	(20)
2025–2026	Flamurtari Vlorë	34	(12)
2026–	Akhmat Grozny	10	(1)

International career^{‡}
2018–2019	Albania U15	3	(2)
2022	Albania U19	3	(0)
2024–	Albania U21	8	(1)
- * Club domestic league appearances and goals as of 31 October 2026 ‡ National team caps and goals as of 30 March 2026

Erald Maksuti (born 10 May 2004) is an Albanian professional footballer who plays as a forward for Akhmat Grozny in the Russian Premier League and the Albania national under-21 team.

He came through the youth academies of Bërdica, Brians, and Apolonia Fier, making his senior debut for the latter at the age of 17 before spending four seasons in the Albanian second tier and joining Flamurtari for the 2025–26 season in top-flight.

He has also represented Albania at various youth international levels, including the under-15, under-19 and under-21 national teams.

== Club career ==
=== Early career ===
Born in Shkodër, Albania, Maksuti emigrated to Greece with his family at the age of four, where he began playing football in local youth academies and spent several years developing his skills before returning to Albania at the age of nine. In 2013, he joined Bërdica in their youth system at under-11 level. He played for Brians at under-17 level during the 2018–19 season. He later underwent trials with several clubs in Italy, but due to restrictions related to the COVID-19 pandemic, he returned to Albania.

He joined Apolonia Fier in 2020, initially featuring for the club's under-17 side and subsequently progressing to the under-19 team, with whom he won the Albanian Under-19 Superliga title during the 2021–22 season. During the 2022–23 season, he took part in the 2022–23 UEFA Youth League and scored three goals across two knockout-round ties.

=== Apolonia Fier ===
He received his first senior team call-up at the age of 17 for an Albanian Cup group stage match against Flamurtari on 13 October 2021, although he did not feature in the match. He made his senior debut in the 2021–22 Kategoria e Parë match against Turbina on 24 November 2021, coming on as a substitute in the 62nd minute and scoring his first senior goal ten minutes later in a 2–0 victory. He went on to make two further substitute appearances for the club during the same season.

During the first half of the 2023–24 Kategoria e Parë season, Maksuti recorded four goals, four assists and won four penalties in his favour. He finished with seven goals as Apolonia finished in 5th place and reached the promotion play-off final, where they were defeated by Flamurtari.

In his final season with Apolonia, Maksuti was one of the club's standout performers, scoring 12 goals in 23 appearances in the 2024–25 Kategoria e Parë before leaving in July 2025 after four seasons to join Flamurtari.

=== Flamurtari ===
On 21 July 2025, Maksuti completed his transfer to Flamurtari in the Kategoria Superiore ahead of the 2025–26 season.

On 29 April 2026, Maksuti scored a hat-trick in Flamurtari's 3–1 home victory over Dinamo City on matchday 33 of the 2025–26 Kategoria Superiore, becoming the only domestic player in the league to score a hat-trick that season.

Following a standout season, Maksuti was sold to Russian Premier League club Akhmat Grozny in May 2026 for a reported fee of €700,000, a record sale for the club in recent years.

=== Akhmat Grozny ===
On 25 May 2026, Maksuti signed a four-year contract with Akhmat Grozny.

== Career statistics ==
As of 31 October 2026

Club	Season	League			Cup		Other		Total	
Club	Season	Division	Apps	Goals	Apps	Goals	Apps	Goals	Apps	Goals
Apolonia Fier	2021–22	Kategoria e Parë	3	1	0	0	0	0	3	1
Apolonia Fier	2022–23	Kategoria e Parë	20	2	1	0	1 (Note: Appearances in promotion play-offs)	0	22	2
Apolonia Fier	2023–24	Kategoria e Parë	30	6	2	0	2	1	34	7
Apolonia Fier	2024–25	Kategoria e Parë	22	11	1	0	1	1	24	12
Apolonia Fier	Total		75	20	4	0	4	2	83	22
Flamurtari Vlorë	2025–26	Kategoria Superiore	34	12	1	0	—		35	12
Akhmat Grozny	2026–27	Russian Premier League	10	1	4	0	—		14	1
Career total			119	33	9	0	4	2	132	35
