= Effiong Eyoh =

Nigerian football Striker

Personal information
- Full name: Effiong Ekemini Eyoh
- Date of birth: 12 July 1996 (age 30)
- Place of birth: Lagos, Nigeria
- Position: Winger

Team information
- Current team: Dinamo Ferizaj

Youth career
- –2016: Jesus Amigos FC

Senior career*
Years	Team	Apps	(Gls)
2016–2017	Dinamo Tirana	24	(5)
2017	Laçi	2	(0)
2018	Turbina	21	(6)
2019	Besa	8	(1)
2019	Shkumbini	10	(5)
2020–2021	Apolonia	25	(2)
2021–2022	Burreli	13	(0)
2022	Al-Sinaa		
2023	A&N		
2023–2024	Vëllaznimi		
2024–2025	Dinamo Ferizaj		
2025–2026	Sopoti		
2026–	Lepenci		
- * Club domestic league appearances and goals

Effiong Eyoh (born 12 July 1996) is a Nigerian football forward who plays for Kosovan club Lepenci.

== Honours ==
Apolonia

- Kategoria e Parë: 2019–20
