= KF Shkodra =

Albanian football club

- Full name: Klubi i Futbollit Shkodra
- Nickname: Arinjtë
- Founded: 9 November 1996; 29 years ago
- Ground: Kompleksi Zmijani
- President: Taip Piraniqi
- Manager: Rudi Piraniqi
- League: Kategoria e Tretë, Group A
- 2025–26: Kategoria e Tretë, Group A, 7th
Home colours	Away colours

KF Shkodra is an Albanian professional football club based in Shkodër. They are currently competing in the Kategoria e Tretë, the fourth tier of Albanian football. Their home ground is Kompleksi Zmijani.

== History ==
Klubi i Futbollit Shkodra was established on 25 September 25 1996, by Taip Piraniqi, a former player and manager of Vllaznia Shkodër. As the second football team in the city, KF Shkodra focused on developing youth talents by creating a structured system for players aged 7 to 19.

The club has developed several highly successful players, including Albania internationals Elseid Hysaj and Armando Vajushi. Other former club members include Arsid Kruja, Antonio Marku, Sindri Guri, Rubin Xhepaj, Ervin Rexha, Marçelino Preka, Donati Toma, Rejan Alivoda, and Elis Kabuni.

In celebration of its 25th anniversary on November 9, 2021, the club adopted the slogan “You’ll Never Walk Alone.” In February 2022, its U-10 team secured a second-place finish at the international "Mimoza Polino Cup", held in Montenegro, narrowly losing 1–2 in the final.

Since August 2022, the club has embarked on a strategic collaboration with Vllaznia Shkodër to further advance youth development in the region.

In 2025, KF Shkodra's senior team returned to professional football and started playing in the Kategoria e Tretë for the 2025–26 season.

== Club colors ==
Initially, the club’s uniforms were yellow and black, but in later years, KF Shkodra adopted its current official colors: purple, white, and black.
