= Paolo Ivani =

Albanian footballer

Personal information
- Date of birth: 12 January 1997 (age 29)
- Place of birth: Korçë, Albania
- Height: 1.90 m (6 ft 3 in)
- Position: Striker

Team information
- Current team: Pogradeci

Youth career
- Skënderbeu

Senior career*
Years	Team	Apps	(Gls)
2016–2021	Skënderbeu	0	(0)
2017	→ Korabi (loan)	11	(0)
2017	→ Vëllaznimi (loan)		
2018	→ Burreli (loan)	8	(1)
2018	→ Pogradeci (loan)	21	(2)
2019–2021	→ Devolli (loan)		
2021–2022	Maliqi	23	(6)
2022–	Pogradeci	30	(1)

International career^{‡}
2013–2014	Albania U17	6	(0)
2015	Albania U19	1	(0)
- * Club domestic league appearances and goals as of 27 February 2017 (UTC) ‡ National team caps and goals as of 17 November 2015

Paolo Ivani (born 12 January 1997) is an Albanian professional footballer who plays as a striker for Albanian club Pogradeci and the Albania national under-19 football team.
