= Arsid Kruja =

Albanian footballer

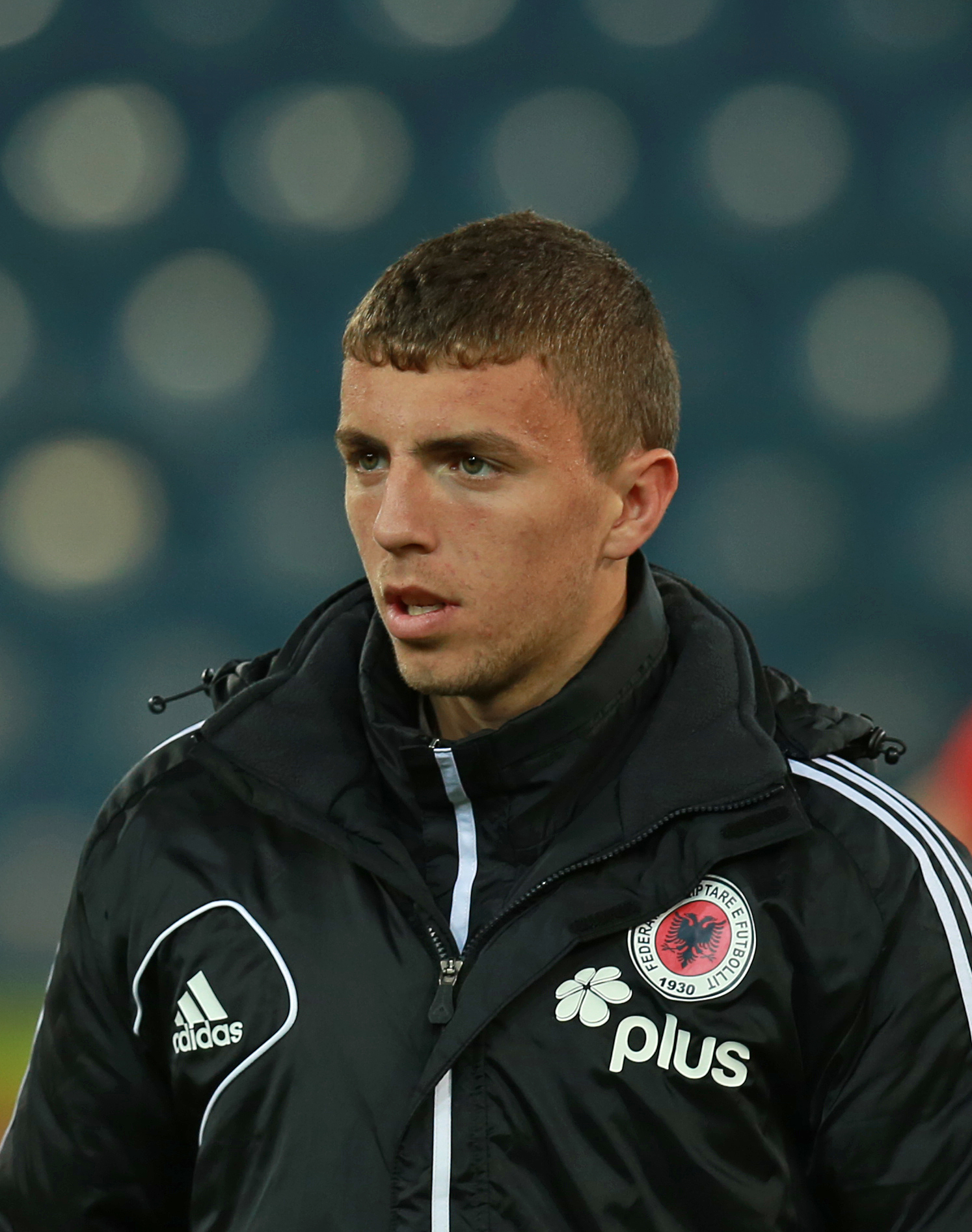

Personal information
- Date of birth: 8 June 1993 (age 33)
- Place of birth: Shkodër, Albania
- Height: 1.79 m (5 ft 10 in)
- Position: Attacking midfielder

Youth career
- 2006–2007: KF Shkodra
- 2008–2012: Vllaznia Shkodër

Senior career*
Years	Team	Apps	(Gls)
2012–2014	Vllaznia Shkodër	56	(6)
2015–2016	Hajer	0	(0)
2015	→ Flamurtari (loan)	14	(1)
2015	→ Laçi (loan)	14	(1)
2016–2018	Vllaznia Shkodër	20	(0)
2018–2019	Teuta Durrës	24	(0)
2019–2023	Vllaznia Shkodër	120	(2)
2023–2025	Teuta Durrës	68	(3)

International career
2013–2015	Albania U-21	3	(0)
- * Club domestic league appearances and goals as of 1 June 2024

Arsid Kruja (born 8 June 1993) is an Albanian football player who plays for in the Kategoria Superiore.

== Career ==
=== Early career ===
Kruja signed a three-year contract extension in January 2014 with a €100,000 release clause.

In January 2015 he joined Saudi Professional League side Hajer Club for a transfer fee of $70,000, where he signed a three-year contract worth $300,000.

He was loaned back to the Albanian Superliga as he signed an 18-month loan deal with Flamurtari Vlorë shortly after signing for Hajer Club. However, Kruja's loan at Flamurtari was cut short and he subsequently went to join another Superliga club in Laçi on a season-long loan deal.
