= David Atanaskoski =

Macedonian footballer

Personal information
- Date of birth: 21 August 1996 (age 30)
- Place of birth: Skopje, Macedonia
- Height: 1.76 m (5 ft 9 in)
- Position: Left-back

Team information
- Current team: Partizani
- Number: 3

Youth career
- –2014: Teteks

Senior career*
| Years | Team | Apps | (Gls) |
| 2015–2016 | Teteks | 9 | (1) |
| 2016 | Horizont Turnovo | | |
| 2017–2020 | Akademija Pandev | 72 | (1) |
| 2020–2021 | Makedonija GP | 25 | (0) |
| 2021–2022 | Shakhter Karagandy | 20 | (0) |
| 2022 | Makedonija GP | 14 | (1) |
| 2022–2024 | Partizani | 63 | (2) |
| 2024 | Politehnica Iași | 14 | (0) |
| 2025– | Partizani | 37 | (0) |

International career
| 2016 | Macedonia U20 | 1 | (0) |
| 2017 | North Macedonia U21 | 1 | (0) |
- * Club domestic league appearances and goals as of 13 May 2026

David Atanaskoski (Macedonian: Давид Атанаскоски; born 21 October 1996) is a Macedonian professional footballer who plays as a left-back for Kategoria Superiore club Partizani.

== Career ==
=== Partizani ===
Atanaskoski joined Albanian club Partizani on 21 June 2022, signing a one-year contract the following day where he was presented to the media before joining the rest of the squad on their pre-season camp in Slovenia.

== Honours ==
Teteks

- Macedonian Cup runner-up: 2014–15

Akademija Pandev

- Macedonian Cup: 2018–19

Shakhter Karagandy

- Kazakhstan Cup runner-up: 2021

Makedonija GP

- Macedonian Cup: 2021–22

Partizani

- Kategoria Superiore: 2022–23
- Albanian Supercup: 2023
