= Paulo Buxhelaj =

Albanian footballer

Personal information
- Full name: Paulo Buxhelaj
- Date of birth: 1 May 2003 (age 23)
- Place of birth: Kuç, Vlorë, Albania
- Height: 1.76 m (5 ft 9 in)
- Position: Left-back

Team information
- Current team: Partizani
- Number: 26

Youth career
- 2015–2016: Himara
- 2019–2022: Partizani

Senior career*
Years	Team	Apps	(Gls)
2022–	Partizani	80	(0)
2021–2022	→ Partizani U21	6	(1)

International career^{‡}
2022	Albania U20	0	(0)
2023–	Albania U21	5	(0)
- * Club domestic league appearances and goals as of 13 May 2026 ‡ National team caps and goals as of 15 September 2023

Paulo Buxhelaj (born 1 May 2003) is an Albanian professional footballer who plays as a left-back for Albanian club Partizani.

== Career statistics ==
=== Club ===
As of 12 September 2023

Club statistics
Club	Season	League			Cup		Europe (Note: Including continental competitions, such as UEFA Champions League and UEFA Europa League)		Other (Note: Including other competitions, such as Albanian Supercup)		Total	
Club	Season	Division	Apps	Goals	Apps	Goals	Apps	Goals	Apps	Goals	Apps	Goals
Partizani	2021–22	Kategoria Superiore	1	0	0	0	—		—		1	0
Partizani	2022–23	Kategoria Superiore	26	0	2	0	0	0	—		28	0
Partizani	2023–24	Kategoria Superiore	0	0	0	0	0	0	—		0	0
Partizani	Total		27	0	2	0	0	0	—		29	0
Partizani U21	2021–22	Kategoria Superiore U-21	6	1	—		—		—		6	1
Partizani U21	Total		6	1	—		—		—		6	1
Career total			33	1	2	0	0	0	0	0	35	1
