= David Olaoye =

English footballer (born 1996)

Personal information
- Date of birth: 18 October 1996 (age 30)
- Place of birth: Goodmayes, Essex, England
- Height: 1.85 m (6 ft 1 in)
- Position: Forward

Team information
- Current team: Deportivo Miranda

Youth career
- Junior Hammers
- Elite Pro Sports
- 2015–2016: OFI

Senior career*
Years	Team	Apps	(Gls)
- Barking
- Newham
- Tottenham Phoenix
- Ware
2016	AO Tympakiou	10	(2)
2017	NK Bravo		
2017–2018	El Porvenir	2	(0)
2019	Nybergsund	16	(1)
2020	Årdal	0	(0)
2020–2022	Jiskra Domažlice	3	(0)
2020–2022	Jiskra Domažlice B	3	(3)
2021	→ Viktoria Otrokovice (loan)	7	(0)
2022–2023	Tomori Berat	11	(5)
2023	Monasterace		
2023–2024	Akragas	5	(0)
2024–2025	ASD Partincaudace	22	(10)
2026–	Deportivo Miranda	2	(0)
- * Club domestic league appearances and goals as of 14 March 2026

David Olaoye (born 18 October 1996) is an English professional footballer who plays as a forward for Liga FUTVE 2 club Deportivo Miranda.

== Career ==
Olaoye spent his youth career with Junior Hammers and Elite Pro Sports. He began his senior career with English non-league sides Barking, Newham, Tottenham Phoenix and Ware. In 2016, he joined Greek regional side AO Tympakiou; amid interest from Sheffield United. After twelve total appearances and two goals in Greece, Olaoye departed to subsequently join NK Bravo of Slovenia in January 2017. His stay lasted a further six months, but four of those were spent off-field due to a notable ligament injury. In August 2017, Primera C Metropolitana side El Porvenir signed Olaoye; signing a two-year contract.

He made his debut on 20 November versus Berazategui, becoming the first English professional to play in Argentine football. He left El Porvenir in June 2018, subsequently having a trial with UAI Urquiza. The trial came to an end due injury to his rib cage which occurred in training, which left him sidelined for over a month. In 2019, Olaoye switched Argentina for Norway after agreeing terms with Nybergsund of the 3. divisjon. He scored on his second appearance against Verdal, though received a red card later in the match. Olaoye moved across the division to join Årdal for 2020. He didn't appear competitively for them, due to the COVID-19 pandemic, and departed midway through the year to sign for Jiskra Domažlice in the Czech Republic.

Olaoye initially featured for Jiskra Domažlice's B team in the fifth tier, scoring twice on his debut versus Baník Stříbro on 12 September. His first appearance for their senior side came on 19 September against Admira Prague, as he was substituted on for the final minutes of a 4–2 win in the Bohemian Football League.

== Personal life ==
Olaoye grew up in Forest Gate, London with Nigerian parents. He supports Arsenal. Two of his three brothers, Daniel & Jonathan, are also footballers.

== Career statistics ==
As of 10 October 2020.

Club statistics
Club	Season	League			Cup		Continental		Other		Total	
Club	Season	Division	Apps	Goals	Apps	Goals	Apps	Goals	Apps	Goals	Apps	Goals
AO Tympakiou	2016–17	A1 Division	10	2	2	0	—		0	0	12	2
El Porvenir	2017–18	Primera C Metropolitana	2	0	0	0	—		0	0	2	0
Nybergsund	2019	3. divisjon	16	1	1	0	—		0	0	17	1
Årdal	2020	3. divisjon	0	0	0	0	—		0	0	0	0
Jiskra Domažlice	2020–21	Bohemian Football League	3	0	0	0	—		0	0	3	0
Jiskra Domažlice B	2020–21	Plzeň Championship	3	3	—		—		0	0	3	3
FK Tomori Berat	2022-2023	Kategoria e Parë	11	2	2	3	—		0	0	11	5
Career total			34	6	3	0	—		0	0	48	11
