= Kofi Yeboah =

Ghanaian footballer (born 1995)

Personal information
- Date of birth: 14 May 1995 (age 31)
- Place of birth: Kumasi, Ghana
- Height: 1.67 m (5 ft 6 in)
- Position: Midfielder

Team information
- Current team: Apolonia Fier
- Number: 88

Senior career*
Years	Team	Apps	(Gls)
2013–2017	Wa All Stars	37	(4)
2017–2020	Tadamon Sour	41	(4)
2020–	Apolonia Fier	27	(0)

International career
2015	Ghana U20	6	(0)
- * Club domestic league appearances and goals as of 14:56, 30 June 2022 (UTC)

Kofi Yeboah (born 14 May 1995) is a Ghanaian professional footballer who plays as a midfielder.

== Club career ==
Yeboah played for Wa All Stars in the Ghana Premier League. In September 2017, he joined Lebanese Premier League side Tadamon Sour on a one-year deal, ahead of the 2017–18 season. After his contract had expired, in October 2020, Yeboah moved to newly promoted Kategoria Superiore side Apolonia Fier in Albania, on a short-term contract with an option to extend at the end of the season.

== International career ==
Yeboah represented Ghana internationally at under-20 level, and competed at the 2015 FIFA U-20 World Cup.
