= Marçelino Preka =

Albanian footballer

Personal information
- Date of birth: 2 August 2003 (age 23)
- Place of birth: Shkodër, Albania
- Height: 1.90 m (6 ft 3 in)
- Position: Defender

Team information
- Current team: Partizani
- Number: 23

Youth career
- 2016: Djelmnia Shkodrane
- 2016–2020: Shkodra
- 2020–2022: Bylis
- 2022–: Partizani

Senior career*
Years	Team	Apps	(Gls)
2020–2022	Bylis	25	(1)
2022–	FK Partizani	72	(3)

International career
2018–2019	Albania U17	9	(1)
2021	Albania U19	5	(0)
- * Club domestic league appearances and goals as of 13 May 2026

Marçelino Preka (born 2 August 2003) is an Albanian professional footballer who plays as a defender for FK Partizani.
