= Benjamin Agyare =

Ghanaian footballer (born 1994)

Personal information
- Date of birth: 8 May 1994 (age 32)
- Place of birth: Accra, Ghana
- Height: 1.80 m (5 ft 11 in)
- Position: Centre-back

Team information
- Current team: Naft Al-Basra

Senior career*
Years	Team	Apps	(Gls)
2014–2018	Heart of Lions	2+	(0+)
2018–2020	Accra Hearts of Oak	20	(0)
2020–2021	Apolonia	32	(0)
2022–2024	Drita	13	(0)
2022	→ Drenica (loan)	12	(0)
2024–	Naft Al-Basra		
- * Club domestic league appearances and goals as of 20 December 2023

Benjamin Agyare (born 8 May 1994) is a Ghanaian professional footballer who plays as a centre-back for Iraqi club Naft Al-Basra. He was signed by FC Drita in August 2022, and same month loaned out to Drenica. In January 2023 he returned to FC Drita.
