= Ismaila Diop =

Senegalese football player

Personal information
- Date of birth: 19 December 1999 (age 26)
- Height: 1.90 m (6 ft 3 in)
- Position: Defender

Team information
- Current team: Civitanovese

Youth career
- –2018: Ascoli

Senior career*
Years	Team	Apps	(Gls)
2017–2019	Ascoli	0	(0)
2018–2019	→ Paganese (loan)	17	(0)
2019–2020	Fano	10	(0)
2020–2021	Fermana	1	(0)
2021–2022	Apolonia	33	(3)
2022–2023	Montegiorgio	32	(2)
2023	Città di Varese	0	(0)
2023–2024	Sant'Angelo	10	(0)
2024–	Civitanovese	12	(0)
- * Club domestic league appearances and goals as of 17 November 2024

Ismaila Diop (born 19 December 1999) is a Senegalese football player who plays as a defender for the Italian Serie D club Civitanovese.

== Club career ==
=== Ascoli ===
On 26 May 2017, Diop signed his first professional contract with Ascoli for a three-year term.

==== Loan to Paganese ====
On 24 August 2018, Diop joined Paganese on a season-long loan. He made his Serie C debut for Paganese on 16 September 2018 in a game against Rende.

=== Serie C ===
On 31 July 2019, he signed a 2-year contract with Serie C club Fano.

On 5 October 2020, he joined Fermana. On 27 January 2021, his contract with Fermana was terminated by mutual consent.

=== Albania ===
After his release by Fermana, he joined the Albanian club Apolonia and made his debut for the club on 31 January 2021 against KF Tirana.
