= American Bank of Investments (Albania) =

Albanian bank

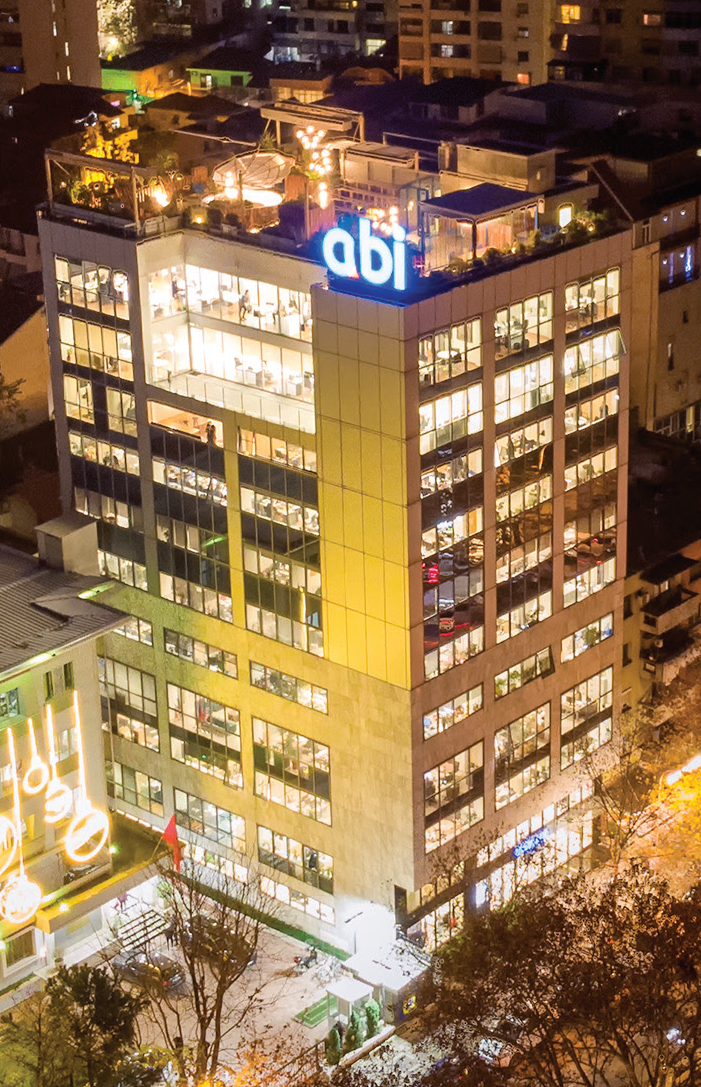
- ABI Bank headquarters in Tirana, Albania
- Company type: Private
- Industry: Banking; Financial services
- Founded: 1999
- Headquarters: Tirana, Albania
- Number of locations: 30
- Area served: Albania
- Key people: Andi Ballta (CEO)
- Products: Banking services; Term deposit; Payments; Debit cards; Credit cards Online banking; Consumer loans; Mortgage loans; Investment loans; Overdrafts
- Revenue: ALL 6,436 million (2024)
- Operating income: ALL 3,777.6 million (2024)
- Net income: ALL 3,205.7 million (2024)
- Total assets: ALL 140,722.8 million (2024)
- Total equity: ALL 12,374.5 million (2024)
- Number of employees: 436 (2024)
- Parent: NCH Capital
- Website: www.abi.al

American Bank of Investments (ABI Bank) is a privately owned commercial bank headquartered in Tirana, Albania. Founded in 1999, it provides banking and financial services to individuals, small businesses, and corporate clients across Albania. ABI is licensed and regulated by Bank of Albania.

The bank was originally known as Intercommercial Bank and after several name changes, was rebranded Emporiki Bank, operating as a local branch of Greece's Emporiki Bank Group. In March 2010 it became part of France's Crédit Agricole Group when it acquired 100% stake at the Greek parent company. In October 2015 Crédit Agricole Albania was acquired by Tranzit sh.p.k, a subsidiary of NCH Capital, a multi-billion dollar private equity fund based in New York and registered with the Security and Exchange Commission (SEC). Subsequently, Credit Agricole Albania changed its name to American Bank of Investments. As of March 2025, ABI Bank has a network of 30 branches in major cities throughout Albania and a total of 436 employees.

== History ==
American Bank of Investments (ABI) was established in 1999 originally known as Intercommercial Bank and after several name changes, was rebranded Emporiki Bank Albania, a subsidiary of Greece's Emporiki Bank Group. It operated as a local branch, providing financial services in Albania for over a decade.

In March 2010, France's Crédit Agricole Group acquired a 100% stake in Emporiki Bank Group, bringing the Albanian subsidiary under the Crédit Agricole Albania brand.

In October 2015, Crédit Agricole Albania was acquired by Tranzit sh.p.k a subsidiary of NCH Capital, a multi-billion dollar private equity fund based in New York and registered with SEC (Security and Exchange Commission). Following the acquisition, the bank was rebranded as American Bank of Investments (ABI Bank) and shifted its focus toward expanding its presence in the Albanian financial sector.

In July 2018, ABI acquired Banka NBG Albania, the Albanian subsidiary of National Bank of Greece (NBG). This acquisition led to the merge of the two banks.

ABI Bank owns 100% of ABI Invest and ABI Broker, operating in investment and insurance markets. ABI Bank is a shareholder of the Albanian Stock Exchange (ALSE) and the Albanian Securities Register (ALREG) the first depository for non-government securities in the Republic of Albania.

In August 2025, ABI Bank announced a merger with the non-banking financial institution NOA, both owned by Tranzit sh.p.k., to consolidate operations and expand lending. The merger was approved by the Bank of Albania in November 2025 and was completed on 27 November 2025, formalizing the integration of NOA into ABI Bank. NOA's assets and staff were transferred to ABI Bank, while the NOA brand continues for microfinance-related services within the bank's structure. At the time of the announcement, NOA operated a network of 29 branches nationwide.

As of 30 September 2025, according to data published by the Albanian Association of Banks, ABI Bank had total assets of ALL 152,832 million, representing approximately 6.9% of the Albanian banking system's assets, and a share of about 7.3% of total lending, making it the seventh-largest bank in Albania by total assets. The same data indicate cumulative net profit of ALL 2,747 million and a return on equity of 29.49%.

== Corporate Social Responsibility ==
In April 2020, during the COVID-19 pandemic, ABI Bank donated medical ventilators to the Ministry of Health in Albania to support the national healthcare response.

In June 2020, ABI Bank provided 3.2 tons of food products to families in need, including those with disabilities, in the Tirana, Shkodër, and Mat districts. The initiative was conducted in collaboration with the Albanian Red Cross, Food Bank Albania, and Down Syndrome Albania.

In 2022, ABI Bank partnered with the United Nations Development Programme (UNDP) to support fifty micro and small businesses in Durrës and Lezha, contributing $100,000 to aid recovery efforts following the 2019 Albania earthquake.
