= Artion Alillari =

Albanian footballer

Personal information
- Full name: Artion Alillari
- Date of birth: 11 September 1995 (age 31)
- Place of birth: Pogradec, Albania
- Positions: Midfielder; forward

Team information
- Current team: Dinamo Tirana
- Number: 7

Youth career
- 2011–2013: Pogradeci

Senior career*
| Years | Team | Apps | (Gls) |
| 2013–2020 | Pogradeci | 104 | (20) |
| 2020– | Dinamo Tirana | 21 | (1) |
- * Club domestic league appearances and goals

Artion Alillari (born 11 September 1995) is an Albanian professional footballer who plays as a midfielder for Albanian club Dinamo Tirana. In January 2022, he was expelled from Pogradeci due to indiscipline.
