= Arjan Bellaj =

Albanian footballer (born 1971)

Arjan Bella
Personal information
- Date of birth: 1 February 1971 (age 55)
- Place of birth: Gjirokastër, Albania
- Height: 1.83 m (6 ft 0 in)
- Position: Defensive midfielder

Team information
- Current team: Vora (manager)

Youth career
- Luftëtari

Senior career*
Years	Team	Apps	(Gls)
1990–1992	Luftëtari	18	(3)
1992–1994	PAS Giannina	58	(25)
1994–1996	Kalamata	43	(9)
1996–1997	Apollon Smyrnis	10	(0)
1997–1998	Ethnikos Piraeus	10	(0)
1998–2002	PAS Giannina	120	(17)
2002–2003	Panionios	42	(5)
2003–2004	Kerkyra	22	(3)
2004–2007	PAS Giannina	86	(9)
Total		409	(71)

International career
1994–2003	Albania	29	(1)

Managerial career
- 2013: Luftëtari
- 2015–2016: Albania U19
- 2019–2020: Apollon Larissa
- 2021: Kalamata (assistant)
- 2022: Kalamata (caretaker)
- 2022–2023: Bylis
- 2023–2024: Bylis
- 2024–: Vora
- * Club domestic league appearances and goals

Arjan Bella (born 1 February 1971) is an Albanian professional football manager and a former midfielder. He is the manager of Vora.

== Club career ==
Bellaj played for PAS Giannina, Kalamata F.C., Apollon Athens, Ethnikos Piraeus F.C. and Panionios F.C. in the Greek Alpha Ethniki.

== International career ==
Bellaj made 31 appearances for the Albania national team from 1994 to 2001.

== Honours ==
=== Player ===
PAS Giannina

- Greek Second Division: 2000
- Greek Cup semi-finals: 2006–07

=== Manager ===
Vora

- Kategoria e Parë: 2024–25
