= Victor (footballer, born 1995) =

Brazilian footballer

Personal information
- Full name: Victor Matheus da Silva Matos
- Date of birth: 4 January 1995 (age 31)
- Place of birth: Cuiabá, Brazil
- Height: 1.78 m (5 ft 10 in)
- Positions: Attacking midfielder; forward

Team information
- Current team: Gokulam Kerala

Youth career
- São Caetano
- 2010–2014: Chievo

Senior career*
Years	Team	Apps	(Gls)
2013–2019	Chievo	1	(0)
2014–2015	→ Pescara (loan)	5	(2)
2015	→ Brescia (loan)	14	(2)
2015–2016	→ Teramo (loan)	16	(2)
2016	→ Istra 1961 (loan)	13	(0)
2016–2017	→ Perugia (loan)	1	(0)
2017	→ Lupa Roma (loan)	5	(0)
2017–2019	→ Fermana (loan)	36	(3)
2019	→ Fano (loan)	3	(0)
2019–2020	Virtus Verona	10	(0)
2020–2022	Vllaznia Shkodër	50	(11)
2022–2023	Partizani Tiranë	32	(14)
2024–2025	Nasaf	12	(0)
2025	Bylis Ballsh	11	(2)
2025–2026	Partizani Tiranë	5	(0)
2025–2026	Partizani Tiranë B	2	(0)
2026	Drenica	5	(0)
2026–	Gokulam Kerala	0	(0)
- * Club domestic league appearances and goals as of 16 September 2026

Victor Matheus da Silva Matos (born 4 January 1995), commonly known as Victor da Silva or simply Victor, is a Brazilian professional footballer who plays as an attacking midfielder or forward for Indian Football League club Gokulam Kerala.

== Club career ==
Born in Cuiabá, Victor da Silva played youth football with São Caetano before moving to Chievo in the 2010 summer. On 19 May 2013 he made his first-team debut, coming on as a second-half substitute in a 2–2 draw at Atalanta. In the 2014–15 season, he played in Serie B for Pescara, scoring two goals. In January 2016, Da Silva moved on loan to Brescia until the end of the season.

On 4 December Victor da Silva scored his first goal, the last of a 4–1 home routing over Reggina, for the campaign's Coppa Italia.

On 15 January 2019, he joined Fano on loan. For the 2019–20 season, he moved to Virtus Verona.

In August 2020, da Silva moved to Albanian club KF Vllaznia Shkodër.

== Honours ==
Partizani Tiranë

- Kategoria Superiore: 2022–23
