= Engjëll Hoti =

Kosovan footballer (born 1997)

Personal information
- Date of birth: 26 February 1997 (age 29)
- Place of birth: Stuttgart, Germany
- Height: 1.88 m (6 ft 2 in)
- Position: Midfielder

Youth career
- –2012: FSV Waiblingen
- 2012: Besa Stuttgart
- 2012–2014: VfB Stuttgart
- 2014: 1. FC Kaiserslautern
- 2014–2015: VfR Aalen
- 2015–2016: Eintracht Braunschweig

Senior career*
Years	Team	Apps	(Gls)
2016–2017	Eintracht Braunschweig II	18	(1)
2017	Rot Weiss Ahlen	8	(1)
2018	TSG Backnang	10	(1)
2019–2020	Trepça '89	30	(5)
2020–2021	Llapi	27	(4)
2021–2022	Tirana	32	(3)
2022–2023	Partizani Tirana	29	(7)
2023–2024	ŁKS Łódź	30	(4)
2024–2026	Ümraniyespor	66	(7)

International career
2016	Albania U21	5	(1)
2017	Kosovo U21	2	(0)
- * Club domestic league appearances and goals as of 6 May 2026

Engjëll Hoti (born 26 February 1997) is an Albanian-Kosovan professional footballer who plays as a midfielder.

== Club career ==
=== Trepça '89 ===
On 1 February 2019, Hoti signed a one-year contract with Kosovo Superleague club Trepça '89. Nine days later, he made his debut with Trepça '89 in the 2018–19 Kosovar Cup quarter-finals against Prishtina after being named in the starting line-up. Six days after debut, he made his league debut in a 2–0 away defeat against Ferizaj after being named in the starting line-up.

=== Llapi ===
On 10 August 2020, Hoti signed a one-year contract with Kosovo Superleague club Llapi and received squad number 16. On 23 September 2020, he was named as a Llapi substitute for the first time in a league match against Gjilani. His debut with Llapi came seven days later in a 1–3 home win against Ballkani after being named in the starting line-up.

=== Tirana ===
On 22 July 2021, Hoti signed a two-year contract with Kategoria Superiore club Tirana, and received squad number 7. On 11 September 2021, he made his debut in a 4–2 home win against Skënderbeu Korçë after being named in the starting line-up.

== International career ==
=== Under-21 ===
==== Albania ====
On 21 January 2016, Hoti was named as part of the Albania U21 squad for 2016 Antalya Cup. His debut with Albania U21 came a day later in 2016 Antalya Cup match against Saudi Arabia U21. Six days after debut, Hoti scored his first goal for Albania U21 in his fourth appearance for the country in a 1–1 draw over Kosovo U21.

==== Kosovo ====
On 21 March 2017, Hoti received a call-up from Kosovo U21 for a 2019 UEFA European Under-21 Championship qualification match against Republic of Ireland U21, and made his debut after being named in the starting line-up.

== Honours ==
Llapi

- Kosovar Cup: 2020–21

Tirana

- Kategoria Superiore: 2021–22

Partizani Tirana

- Kategoria Superiore: 2022–23
