= 2024–25 Kategoria e Parë =

Kategoria e Parë
- Season: 2024–25
- Champions: Vora; 1st title
- Promoted: Vora; Flamurtari
- Relegated: Valbona; Erzeni
- Matches: 198
- Goals: 478 (2.41 per match)
- Top goalscorer: Manfredas Ruzgis (24 goals)
- Biggest home win: Apolonia 5−0 Erzeni (30 October 2024); Lushnja 5−0 Kukësi (26 October 2024)
- Biggest away win: Kukësi 0−5 Besa (30 October 2024)
- Highest scoring: Kastrioti 4−3 Korabi (3 November 2024); Valbona 3−4 Vora (8 December 2024)
- Longest winning run: 9 matches Flamurtari
- Longest unbeaten run: 17 matches Vora
- Longest winless run: 18 matches Erzeni
- Longest losing run: 8 matches Erzeni

The 2024–25 Kategoria e Parë was the 77th official season of the Albanian football second-tier since its establishment. The season began on 24 August 2024 and ended on 20 April 2025. There were 12 teams competing this season. The winning and runner-up teams gained promotion to the 2025–26 Kategoria Superiore. The promotion play-offs winner will play a promotion play-off match against the 8th ranked team of the 2024–25 Kategoria Superiore. Flamurtari and Vora were promoted to the 2025–26 Kategoria Superiore. Erzeni and Valbona were relegated to the 2025–26 Kategoria e Dytë.

== Changes from last season ==
=== Team changes ===
==== From Kategoria e Parë ====
Promoted to Kategoria Superiore:

- Bylis
- Elbasani

Relegated to Kategoria e Dytë:

- Luzi 2008
- Tomori

==== To Kategoria e Parë ====
Relegated from Kategoria Superiore:

- Erzeni
- Kukësi

Promoted from Kategoria e Dytë:

- Pogradeci
- Valbona

== Locations ==
2024–25 Kategoria e Parë teams.

=== Stadia by capacity and locations ===
Team	Location	Stadium	Capacity
Apolonia	Fier	Loni Papuçiu Stadium	6,800
Besa	Kavajë	Egnatia Arena	2,196
Burreli	Burrel	Liri Ballabani Stadium	3,000
Erzeni	Shijak	Tofik Jashari Stadium	4,000
Flamurtari	Vlorë	Flamurtari Stadium	8,200
Kastrioti	Krujë	Redi Maloku Stadium	3,000
Korabi	Peshkopi	Korabi Stadium	6,000
Kukësi	Kukës	Kukës Arena	6,322
Lushnja	Lushnjë	Roza Haxhiu Stadium	8,500
Pogradeci	Pogradec	Gjorgji Kyçyku Stadium	10,700
Valbona	Bajram Curri	Vëllezërit Gega Stadium	2,400
Vora	Vorë	Vorë Stadium	4,000

== League table ==
Pos	Team	Pld	W	D	L	GF	GA	GD	Pts	Promotion or relegation
1	Vora (C, P)	33	24	4	5	55	24	+31	76	Promotion to 2025–26 Kategoria Superiore
2	Flamurtari (P)	33	23	6	4	62	21	+41	75	Promotion to 2025–26 Kategoria Superiore
3	Besa	33	22	8	3	54	18	+36	74	Promotion play-off to 2025–26 Kategoria Superiore
4	Burreli	33	16	10	7	36	22	+14	58	Promotion play-off to 2025–26 Kategoria Superiore
5	Pogradeci	33	14	7	12	33	35	−2	49	Promotion play-off to 2025–26 Kategoria Superiore
6	Apolonia	33	11	12	10	45	32	+13	45	Promotion play-off to 2025–26 Kategoria Superiore
7	Lushnja	33	13	5	15	39	41	−2	44	
8	Korabi	33	12	5	16	35	48	−13	41	
9	Kastrioti (O)	33	11	5	17	35	49	−14	38	Relegation play-out to 2025–26 Kategoria e Dytë
10	Kukësi (O)	33	8	4	21	29	56	−27	28	Relegation play-out to 2025–26 Kategoria e Dytë
11	Valbona (R)	33	3	7	23	29	59	−30	16	Relegation to 2025–26 Kategoria e Dytë
12	Erzeni (R)	33	2	5	26	16	63	−47	11	Relegation to 2025–26 Kategoria e Dytë

Rules for classification: 1) Points; 2) Head-to-head points; 3) Head-to-head goal difference; 4) Head-to-head goals scored; 5) Goal difference; 6) Goals scored; 7) Draw.
(C) Champions; (O) Play-off winners; (P) Promoted; (R) Relegated

=== Rounds 1–22 ===
Home \ Away	APO	BES	BUR	ERZ	FLA	KAS	KOR	KUK	LUS	POG	VAL	VOR
Apolonia	—	1–2	1–1	5–0	1–1	2–2	4–2	2–3	0–1	0–0	0–0	2–0
Besa	0–2	—	3–0	2–3	0–0	3–0	1–0	2–1	1–0	0–0	2–1	1–1
Burreli	0–1	1–1	—	1–0	1–1	3–1	0–0	0–0	1–0	2–1	0–0	0–1
Erzeni	0–0	0–0	0–2	—	0–2	2–3	0–2	0–1	0–1	1–2	1–1	0–1
Flamurtari	3–1	3–1	1–2	2–1	—	3–0	3–0	2–0	2–1	4–0	2–0	3–0
Kastrioti	1–0	0–1	2–1	2–1	0–1	—	4–3	1–0	2–1	2–0	1–1	0–2
Korabi	0–3	0–3	0–0	1–1	1–2	2–1	—	2–1	0–0	3–1	4–2	0–1
Kukësi	1–2	0–5	0–3	1–0	1–2	0–1	1–0	—	1–2	3–1	1–1	0–4
Lushnja	2–1	0–0	0–1	0–0	0–3	2–0	3–1	5–0	—	1–0	0–2	1–3
Pogradeci	1–0	0–2	0–2	1–0	0–0	3–1	1–0	2–0	1–0	—	1–0	1–1
Valbona	1–1	0–2	0–4	1–0	0–1	0–0	0–1	1–2	2–4	2–3	—	3–4
Vora	1–0	1–1	2–0	5–1	3–2	3–2	3–0	2–0	1–0	1–0	2–1	—

Legend: Blue = home team win; Yellow = draw; Red = away team win.
For upcoming matches, an "a" indicates there is an article about the rivalry between the two participants.

=== Rounds 23–33 ===
Home \ Away	APO	BES	BUR	ERZ	FLA	KAS	KOR	KUK	LUS	POG	VAL	VOR
Apolonia			0–0		1–2		3–0		0–0		2–1	
Besa	2–0		0–0	2–0				2–1	3–0			1–0
Burreli				1–0	0–0	1–0	1–2			1–0	2–1	
Erzeni	1–5					2–3	0–2	0–3			2–1	
Flamurtari		0–2		2–0		2–1	4–1			1–2	2–0	
Kastrioti	1–1	2–3						2–0		0–0		0–1
Korabi		0–2				1–0		1–1		3–0		0–1
Kukësi	1–2		1–2		1–1				1–2		3–0	
Lushnja			1–3	3–0	0–4	1–0	0–1				4–1	
Pogradeci	1–1	0–1		3–0				3–0	2–2			1–0
Valbona		1–3				3–0	1–2			1–2		0–1
Vora	1–1		2–0	2–0	0–1			1–0	4–2			

Legend: Blue = home team win; Yellow = draw; Red = away team win.
For upcoming matches, an "a" indicates there is an article about the rivalry between the two participants.

=== Positions by round ===
The table lists the positions of teams after each week of matches.

Team ╲ Round	1	2	3	4	5	6	7	8	9	10	11	12	13	14	15	16	17	18	19	20	21	22	23	24	25	26	27	28	29	30	31	32	33
Vora	5	2	3	3	3	3	3	2	2	2	2	3	3	1	1	1	1	1	1	1	1	1	1	1	1	1	1	1	1	1	1	1	1
Flamurtari	8	5	2	2	2	2	2	1	1	1	1	1	1	3	3	3	2	2	2	2	2	2	2	2	2	2	2	2	2	2	2	2	2
Besa	2	1	1	1	1	1	1	3	3	3	3	2	2	2	2	2	3	3	3	3	3	3	3	3	3	3	3	3	3	3	3	3	3
Burreli	3	3	4	4	4	4	4	5	4	4	5	5	5	5	4	4	4	4	4	4	4	4	4	4	4	4	4	4	4	4	4	4	4
Pogradeci	1	6	9	10	7	8	7	7	7	8	6	7	6	6	7	6	6	7	7	7	5	5	6	6	6	6	6	6	5	5	5	5	5
Apolonia	9	8	5	7	10	10	10	10	8	7	8	8	8	9	9	9	8	8	8	8	8	8	8	8	8	8	8	7	7	7	7	6	6
Lushnja	7	4	7	5	5	7	6	6	6	6	7	6	7	7	6	7	7	6	6	6	7	6	5	5	5	5	5	5	6	6	6	7	7
Korabi	6	9	11	6	9	9	9	9	10	9	9	10	10	10	10	10	10	10	10	10	10	9	9	9	9	9	9	9	8	9	8	8	8
Kastrioti	11	10	6	9	6	5	5	4	5	5	4	4	4	4	5	5	5	5	5	5	6	7	7	7	7	7	7	8	9	8	9	9	9
Kukësi	4	7	10	11	8	6	8	8	9	10	10	9	9	8	8	8	9	9	9	9	9	10	10	10	10	10	10	10	10	10	10	10	10
Valbona	12	11	8	8	11	11	11	11	11	11	11	11	11	11	11	11	11	11	11	11	11	11	11	11	11	11	11	11	11	11	11	11	11
Erzeni	10	12	12	12	12	12	12	12	12	12	12	12	12	12	12	12	12	12	12	12	12	12	12	12	12	12	12	12	12	12	12	12	12

Leader and promotion to 2025−26 Kategoria Superiore
Promotion to 2025−26 Kategoria Superiore
Promotion play-off
Relegation play-off
Relegation to 2025–26 Kategoria e Dytë

== Promotion play-offs ==
=== Bracket ===
Semi-finals
Besa	1
Apolonia	1
Burreli	0
Pogradeci	1

Final
Besa	0
Pogradeci	1

=== Semi-finals ===
24 April 2025
15:00

Besa	1−1	Apolonia
Abdulai 86'		Maksuti 75'

Niko Dovana Stadium, Durrës
Referee: Ditmir Grimci

Besa qualified to the final as the team with the higher ranking.

24 April 2025
15:00

Burreli	0–1	Pogradeci
		Krasniqi 21'

Liri Ballabani Stadium, Burrel
Referee: Erjon Bastari

=== Final ===
28 April 2025
17:00

Besa	0−1	Pogradeci
		Alidema 14'

Elbasan Arena, Elbasan
Referee: Eldorjan Hamiti

Pogradeci qualified to the final play-off match.

== Relegation play-offs ==
27 April 2025
15:00

Kastrioti	1−0	Luzi 2008
Hoxha 62'

Vora Stadium, Vorë
Referee: Andi Koçi

26 April 2025
16:00

Kukësi	1−0	Oriku
Danaj 31' (pen.)

Arena e Demave, Tirana
Referee: Olsion Yzeiraj

== Top scorers ==
Rank	Player	Club	Goals
1	(Lithuania) Manfredas Ruzgis	Vora	24
2	(Albania) Aldrit Oshafi	Flamurtari	16
3	(Albania) Florenc Ferruku	Burreli	15
4	(Albania) Xhovalin Trifoni	Apolonia	13
5	(Albania) Taulant Marku	Korabi	12
6	(Albania) Erald Maksuti	Apolonia	11

== Notes and references ==
=== Notes ===
1. Besa will play their 2024–25 home games at the Egnatia Arena in Rrogozhinë, since their venue, Besa Stadium, is not suitable for Kategoria e Parë matches.
2. Kastrioti will play their 2024–25 home games at the Redi Maloku Stadium in Fushë-Krujë, since their venue, Kastrioti Stadium, is not suitable for Kategoria e Parë matches.
