= Mario Gjata =

Albanian footballer

Personal information
- Full name: Mario Gjata
- Date of birth: 6 July 2000 (age 26)
- Place of birth: Fier, Albania
- Position: Centre-forward

Team information
- Current team: Skënderbeu
- Number: 29

Youth career
- 2011–2012: Fieri
- 2012–2015: Apolonia 98
- 2015–2019: Apolonia

Senior career*
Years	Team	Apps	(Gls)
2017–2021	Apolonia	86	(28)
2021–2022	Dinamo Tirana	3	(0)
2022–2023	Apolonia	21	(6)
2023–2024	Teuta	13	(1)
2024	Egnatia	5	(1)
2024–2025	Bylis	25	(2)
2025–	Skënderbeu	8	(1)

International career
2021–2023	Albania U-21	2	(0)
- * Club domestic league appearances and goals as of 12 December 2025

Mario Gjata (born 6 July 2000) is an Albanian professional footballer who plays as a centre-forward for Albanian club Bylis.

== Club career ==
=== Skënderbeu (2025–present) ===
On 1 September 2025, Gjata joined the Kategoria e Parë club Skënderbeu.

== Honours ==
Egnatia

- Kategoria Superiore: 2023–24
- Albanian Cup: 2023–24
