= Mario Barjamaj =

Albanian footballer

Personal information
- Date of birth: 27 July 1998 (age 28)
- Place of birth: Tirana, Albania
- Position: Midfielder

Team information
- Current team: Vora
- Number: 27

Youth career
- –2017: Partizani Tirana

Senior career*
Years	Team	Apps	(Gls)
2017–2018	Partizani Tirana	1	(0)
2018–2021	Bylis	50	(3)
2021–2022	Tomori	32	(4)
2022–2024	Laçi	51	(3)
2024–	Vora	46	(0)
- * Club domestic league appearances and goals as of 13 May 2026

Mario Barjamaj (born 27 June 1998) is an Albanian footballer who plays as a midfielder for Vora in the Kategoria Superiore.

== Career ==
=== Bylis ===
In August 2018, Barjamaj signed with then-Albanian First Division club KF Bylis on a free transfer. He made his league debut for the club on 9 September 2018, coming on as a 57th-minute substitute for Beji Anthony in a 1–0 away defeat to Egnatia. A month later, Barjamaj scored his first goal for the club in official competition, netting in the 42nd minute of a 3-0 league victory over Elbasani.
