= Romeo Harizaj =

Albanian footballer

Personal information
- Date of birth: 26 September 1998 (age 28)
- Place of birth: Ballsh, Albania
- Height: 1.90 m (6 ft 3 in)
- Position: Goalkeeper

Team information
- Current team: Vora
- Number: 55

Youth career
- 2010–2013: Bylis Ballsh
- 2013–2016: Shkëndija Durrës

Senior career*
Years	Team	Apps	(Gls)
2016–2024	Apolonia	128	(1)
2017–2018	→ Albpetrol (loan)	25	(0)
2021–2022	→ Dinamo Tirana (loan)	14	(0)
2024–2025	Tirana	0	(0)
2025–	Vora	19	(0)

International career
2019	Albania U21	1	(0)
- * Club domestic league appearances and goals as of 13 May 2026

Romeo Harizaj (born 26 September 1998) is an Albanian professional footballer who plays as a goalkeeper for Kategoria Superiore club Vora.
