= Redon Mihana =

Albanian footballer

Personal information
- Date of birth: 28 June 1999 (age 27)
- Place of birth: Tirana, Albania
- Height: 1.81 m (5 ft 11 in)
- Position: Winger

Team information
- Current team: Marsaxlokk
- Number: 28

Youth career
- 2014–2015: Laçi
- 2015–2017: Apolonia

Senior career*
Years	Team	Apps	(Gls)
2017–2021	Apolonia	92	(27)
2021–2022	Dinamo Tirana	30	(1)
2022–2023	Egnatia	10	(0)
2023	→ Kastrioti (loan)	12	(4)
2023–2024	Erzeni	33	(5)
2024	Kapaz	4	(0)
2025	Ħamrun Spartans	11	(0)
2025–	Marsaxlokk	17	(1)

International career^{‡}
2017–2018	Albania U19	1	(0)
2019–	Albania U21	3	(0)
- * Club domestic league appearances and goals as of 7 May 2026 ‡ National team caps and goals as of 29 September 2020

Redon Mihana (born 28 June 1999) is an Albanian professional footballer who plays as a winger for Maltese Premier League club Marsaxlokk.

== Club career ==
Mihana started his youth career at KF Laçi in 2014 and spent one season there before moving at Apolonia. In the 2016–17 season he played 10 games and scored 4 goals with the under-19 side.

In July 2024, Mihana joined Azerbaijan Premier League club Kapaz on an initial one-year deal.

== International career ==
Mihana debuted at international level with Albania under-19 team under coach Erjon Bogdani on 30 August 2017 against Georgia U19 playing as a starter in a 1–0 victory at Loni Papuçiu Stadium in Fier.

== Career statistics ==
=== Club ===
As of 23 December 2017

Club statistics
Club	Season	League			Cup		Europe (Note: Including continental competitions, such as UEFA Champions League and UEFA Europa League)		Other (Note: Including other competitions, such as Albanian Supercup)		Total	
Club	Season	Division	Apps	Goals	Apps	Goals	Apps	Goals	Apps	Goals	Apps	Goals
Apolonia	2017–18	Kategoria e Parë	6	2	2	0	—		—		8	2
Career total			6	2	2	0	—		—		8	2
