= Eljon Sota =

Albanian footballer

Personal information
- Date of birth: 24 May 1998 (age 28)
- Place of birth: Fier, Albania
- Height: 1.86 m (6 ft 1 in)
- Position: Defender

Team information
- Current team: Egnatia
- Number: 28

Youth career
- 2011–2014: Qendra Sociale Murialdo
- 2014–2017: Apollonia

Senior career*
Years	Team	Apps	(Gls)
2016–2021	Apolonia	96	(2)
2021–2024	Partizani Tirana	86	(3)
2024	Suwon	1	(0)
2025–	Egnatia	36	(3)
- * Club domestic league appearances and goals as of 25 June 2026

Eljon Sota (born 24 June 1998) is an Albanian footballer who plays as a defender for Egnatia in the Kategoria Superiore.
