= Vora FK =

Albanian football club

Vora
- Full name: Vora Futboll Klub
- Founded: 1989; 37 years ago
- Ground: Vora Stadium
- Capacity: 3,200
- Owner: Albert Xhabafti
- Chairman: Klevis Xhabafti
- Manager: Arjan Bellaj
- League: Kategoria Superiore
- 2025–26: Kategoria Superiore, 7th
Home colours	Away colours

Vora Futboll Klub is an Albanian professional football club based in Vorë. Founded in 1989, the club spent much of its early history competing in the lower divisions of Albanian football before achieving a rapid rise through the 2010s and 2020s. During the 2024–25 season, the club earned its first ever promotion to Kategoria Superiore.

== History ==
Vora FK was founded in 1989 and spent its early years competing in the lower divisions of Albanian football.

The club achieved the first major success during the 2013–14 season, when it made its debut in the Albanian Third Division. Vora won the league title by defeating Spartak Tirana 2–1 in the final at Selman Stërmasi Stadium, earning promotion to the Second Division. This success was largely credited to head coach Elidon Topi and administrator Emiljano Gega, who oversaw the club’s development for six consecutive seasons until the conclusion of the 2019–20 campaign.

Since 2020, the club has been led by president Albert Xhabafti in collaboration with the Vorë municipal administration.

During the 2024–25 Albanian First Division season, managed by Arjan Bellaj, Vora achieved promotion to Kategoria Superiore for the first time in its history after a 2–0 victory over Burreli, with two matches remaining.

== Honours ==
- Kategoria e Parë:
  - Champions (1): 2024–25
- Kategoria e Dytë:
  - Champions (3): 2017–18, 2019–20, 2022–23
- Kategoria e Tretë:
  - Champions (1): 2011-12

== Current squad ==
As of 1 September 2026

Note: Flags indicate national team as defined under FIFA eligibility rules; some limited exceptions apply. Players may hold more than one non-FIFA nationality.

No.	Pos.	Nation	Player
1	GK	ALB	Bjorni Betoja
2	DF	ALB	Henri Zuna
4	DF	ALB	Ersildjo Asllanaj
5	DF	ALB	Rajmond Marinaj
6	DF	ALB	Cristian Shiba
7	FW	ALB	Bernard Karrica
8	MF	ALB	Françesko Hasaj
9	FW	BRA	Pedro Clemente
10	MF	ALB	Klaus Kashari
11	FW	MKD	Dimitar Trajkov
14	MF	ALB	Jurgen Vrapi
16	MF	ALB	Orgito Ruçi
17	DF	ALB	Milan Kovaçi

No.	Pos.	Nation	Player
18	DF	ENG	Kevin Dalipi
19	MF	NGR	Adeloye Ayodele
21	MF	ALB	Leandro Frroku
22	FW	ALB	Emiljano Mihana
23	GK	ALB	Shkëlzen Ruçi
24	FW	ALB	Dario Daka
27	MF	ALB	Mario Barjamaj
29	FW	KOS	Kevin Halabaku
33	DF	ALB	Dajan Shehi (captain)
55	GK	ALB	Romeo Harizaj
77	FW	ALB	Briajan Gjyla
99	DF	GRE	Konstantinos Dionellis
—	DF	ALB	Renato Halili

== Head coaches ==
- (Albania) Gerald Cani (1 Aug 2015 – 30 Jun 2022)
- (Albania) Artan Mërgjyshi (20 Jul 2022 – 25 Oct 2023)
- (Albania) Klodian Arbëri (30 Oct 2023 – 10 Mar 2024)
- (Albania) Endri Zjarri (11 Mar 2024 – 30 Jun 2024)
- (Albania) Arjan Bellaj (1 Jul 2024 –)
