= 2024 Albanian Cup final =

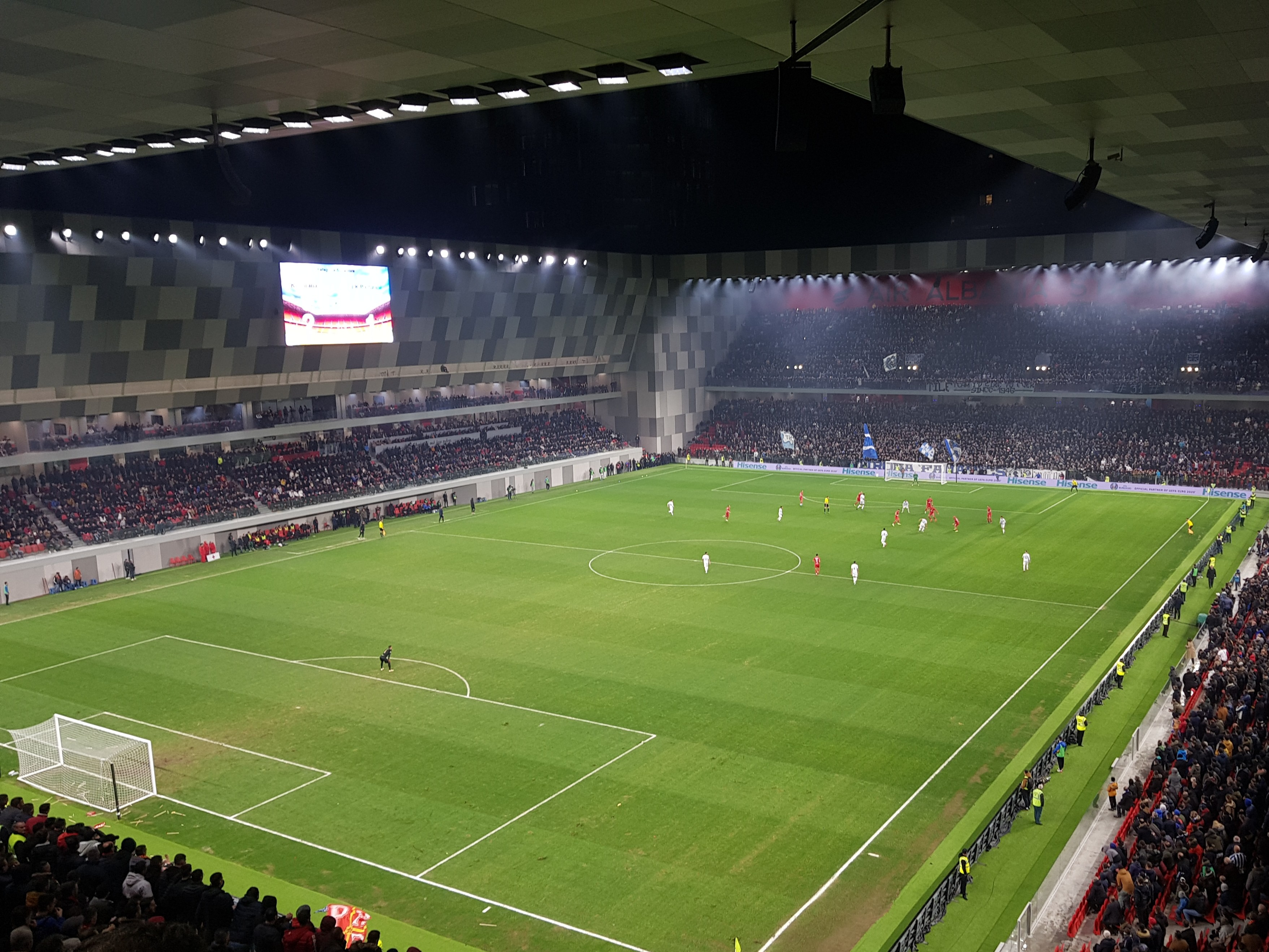
- The Arena Kombëtare in Tirana hosted the final
- Event: 2023–24 Albanian Cup
Kukësi	Egnatia
0	1
- Date: 14 May 2024
- Venue: Arena Kombëtare, Tirana
- Referee: Juxhin Xhaja

The 2024 Albanian Cup final was the final match of the 2023–24 edition of the Albanian Cup, and the 72nd final of Albania's premier national football cup. It was played on 14 May 2024 between Kukësi and Egnatia.

Egnatia won the match 1–0 for their second consecutive and second overall Albanian Cup title.

== Background ==
Kukësi had previously played in four Albanian Cup finals, winning twice. Their most recent final appearance was in 2019, a 2–1 victory against Tirana; while their other win was in 2016, a 5–4 victory over penalties against Laçi. Egnatia had already won the previous edition while also being on a sixteen matches unbeaten streak. Their most recent final appearance was a 1–0 extra time victory against Tirana in 2023.

== Road to the final ==
Note: In all results below, the score of the finalist is given first (H: home; A: away).

Kukësi		Round	Egnatia
Opponent	Result	2023–24 Albanian Cup	Opponent	Result
Elbasani	1–0	Round of 16	Lushnja	2–0
Partizani	0–1 (H), 1−0 (A) (1–1 agg.), (5–3 pen.)	Quarter-finals	Laçi	1−0 (A), 3−1 (H) (4–1 agg.)
Tirana	2–0 (H), 0–1 (A) (2–1 agg.)	Semi-finals	Vllaznia	1–0 (H), 1–1 (A) (2–1 agg.)

== Match ==
=== Details ===
14 May 2024
19:00 CEST

Kukësi	0–1	Egnatia
	Report	Ndreca 38'

Arena Kombëtare, Tirana
Referee: Juxhin Xhaja

Kukësi	Egnatia

1	(Albania) Angelo Tafa (c)
4	(Albania) Franko Lamçe		(substituted off) 71'
5	(Albania) Endri Reçi	(yellow card) 80'
6	(Greece) Vasilios Zogos	(yellow card) 78'
8	(Albania) Kleandro Lleshi	(yellow card) 81'	(substituted off) 87'
17	(Albania) Redon Dragoshi		(substituted off) 24'
18	(Greece) Theodoros Mingos
44	(Nigeria) Mustapha Gbolahan
46	(Albania) Franci Lala
88	(Albania) Plarent Fejzaj	(yellow card) 77'
17	(Moldova) Nicolai Solodovnicov	(yellow card) 63'
Substitutes:
12	(Albania) Kristjan Rroku
3	(Albania) Endri Murati
9	(Albania) Atdhe Rashiti		(substituted on) 71'
10	(Albania) Françesko Hasaj		(substituted on) 24'
14	(Nigeria) Daniel Momoh
16	(Nigeria) Adetola Lawal
22	(Albania) Geri Selita
26	(Albania) Nikolin Duka
33	(Kosovo) Melos Zenunaj		(substituted on) 87'
97	(Brazil) Matheus Motta
Manager:
(Albania) Bledar Devolli

1	(Albania) Alen Sherri
3	(Haiti) François Dulysse	(yellow card) 90'
9	(Costa Rica) Jurguens Montenegro
11	(Brazil) Fernando Medeiros	(yellow card) 52'	(substituted off) 84'
13	(Albania) Renato Malota (c)
16	(Albania) Edison Ndreca
17	(Albania) Arbin Zejnullai	(yellow card) 62'
19	(Kosovo) Arbenit Xhemajli
28	(Italy) Alessandro Ahmetaj
44	(Albania) Abdurraman Fangaj
77	(Turkey) Melih İbrahimoğlu
Substitutes:
12	(Albania) Ilir Dabjani
4	(Albania) Amer Duka
7	(France) Youba Dramé
14	(Ivory Coast) Lorougnon Doukouo
22	(Albania) Irdi Morina
23	(Lithuania) Jouzas Lubas
24	(Albania) Rezart Rama		(substituted on) 62'
29	(Albania) Mario Gjata		(substituted on) 81'
70	(Albania) Sebastjan Spahiu
Manager:
(Albania) Edlir Tetova

Assistant referees:
Denis Rexha
Arbër Zalla
Fourth official:
Eldorjan Hamiti
Video assistant referee:
Kreshnik Barjamaj
Assistant video assistant referee:
Florjan Lata

Match rules

- 90 minutes.
- 30 minutes of extra time if necessary.
- Penalty shoot-out if scores still level.
- Fifteen named substitutes.
- Maximum of five substitutions, with a sixth allowed in extra time.
