= Kibe =

Kibe may refer to:

- Kibbeh, a family of dishes based on spiced ground meat and grain
- Kibe, a surname
- A kibe, or ulcerated chilblain
- Kibe, a lineage of the Jōdo Shinshū school of Buddhism
- KIBE FM, a radio station licensed to Broken Bow, Oklahoma, United States
- Kibe (footballer) (born 2000), Brazilian footballer
