= Bulticë =

- Village
- Location within Albania
- Coordinates: 41°16′32″N 19°46′49″E
- Country: Albania
- County: Tirana
- Municipality: Tirana
- Administrative unit: Vaqarr
- Time zone: UTC+1 (CET)
  - Summer (DST): UTC+2 (CEST)

Bulticë is a village in the former municipality of Vaqarr in Tirana County, Albania. At the 2015 local government reform it became part of the municipality Tirana. The Xhabafti family are natives to the village. The population of the village is over 600 people.
