= Meanings of minor-planet names: 129001–130000 =

As minor planet discoveries are confirmed, they are given a permanent number by the IAU's Minor Planet Center (MPC), and the discoverers can then submit names for them, following the IAU's naming conventions. The list below concerns those minor planets in the specified number-range that have received names, and explains the meanings of those names.

Official naming citations of newly named small Solar System bodies are approved and published in a bulletin by IAU's Working Group for Small Bodies Nomenclature (WGSBN). Before May 2021, citations were published in MPC's Minor Planet Circulars for many decades. Recent citations can also be found on the JPL Small-Body Database (SBDB). Until his death in 2016, German astronomer Lutz D. Schmadel compiled these citations into the Dictionary of Minor Planet Names (DMP) and regularly updated the collection.

Based on Paul Herget's The Names of the Minor Planets, Schmadel also researched the unclear origin of numerous asteroids, most of which had been named prior to World War II. This article incorporates text from this source, which is in the public domain: SBDB New namings may only be added to this list below after official publication as the preannouncement of names is condemned. The WGSBN publishes a comprehensive guideline for the naming rules of non-cometary small Solar System bodies.

== 129001–129100 ==
Named minor planet	Provisional	This minor planet was named for...	Ref · Catalog
129026 Conormcmenamin	2004 TE_{345}	Conor Brendan McMenamin (born 1989) is a student engineer at the Massachusetts Institute of Technology working as the Thermal Engineer guiding the design and stable temperature performance of the student-built Regolith X-ray Imaging Spectrometer aboard the OSIRIS-REx asteroid sample-return mission.	JPL · 129026
129050 Lowellcogburn	2004 VW_{9}	Lowell Cogburn (born 1955) is lead dynamics analyst responsible for Touch and Go dynamic analysis and Sample Return Capsule release dynamic analysis for the OSIRIS-REx asteroid sample-return mission. He was the Dynamics lead on the GRAIL lunar mission.	JPL · 129050
129051 Chrismay	2004 VO_{10}	Chris May (born 1972) is the Thermal Lead for the OSIRIS-REx asteroid sample-return mission. He was the Thermal Lead for the GRAIL lunar mission and thermal engineer on the Mars Phoenix lander, Mars Reconnaissance Orbiter and Mars Odyssey missions.	JPL · 129051
129052 Nîmeshdave	2004 VC_{11}	Nîmesh Dave (born 1972) is the Certified Principal Engineer (CPE) for the OSIRIS-REx asteroid sample-return mission. He was the structures CPE on the GRAIL lunar mission, and mechanical design engineer on ORION and MSL Aeroshell.	JPL · 129052
129053 Derekshannon	2004 VP_{12}	Derek Shannon (born 1976) is the Mechanical Analysis Lead and mechanical Certified Test Conductor for the OSIRIS-REx asteroid sample-return mission. He held the same role on the GRAIL mission, and was a stress analyst on Juno and MSL Aeroshell.	JPL · 129053
129060 Huntskretsch	2004 VH_{21}	Hunts Kretsch (born 1957) is the Certified Principal Engineer for the capsule of the OSIRIS-REx asteroid sample-return mission.	JPL · 129060
129061 Karlfortney	2004 VM_{22}	Karl Fortney (born 1962) is the Mechanisms Certified Principal Engineer for the OSIRIS-REx asteroid sample-return mission. He was a mechanical engineer on the MAVEN and Juno missions as well as the MSL Aeroshell.	JPL · 129061
129063 Joshwood	2004 VF_{26}	Josh Wood (born 1977) is the flight system System Design Lead and CPE at Lockheed Martin for the OSIRIS-REx asteroid sample-return mission. He was also Systems/ Electrical/Payload Accommodations Engineer for the GRAIL program, and the STL lead for the Phoenix Mars Lander.	JPL · 129063
129064 Jeanneladewig	2004 VT_{26}	Jeanne Ladewig (born 1957) is the flight system Payload Accommodation Lead Engineer and the TAGCAMS CPE at Lockheed Martin for the OSIRIS-REx asteroid sample-return mission and the Payload Accommodation Lead Engineer on the Juno and Phoenix missions. She has multi-mission experience working payloads on NASA interplanetary missions.	JPL · 129064
129068 Alexmay	2004 VU_{52}	Alex May (born 1981) is the flight system Touch-And-Go Mission Phase Lead at Lockheed Martin for the OSIRIS-REx asteroid sample-return mission. Alex has worked on a number of missions and research programs developing proximity operations technologies within System Engineering and Guidance, Navigation and Control teams.	JPL · 129068
129071 Catriegle	2004 VF_{54}	Cat Riegle (born 1976) is the flight system Contamination Control Lead at Lockheed Martin for the OSIRIS-REx asteroid sample-return mission. She has supported multiple NASA interplanetary missions helping to ensure that contamination control and planetary protection requirements are met.	JPL · 129071
129073 Sandyfreund	2004 VP_{59}	Sandy Freund (born 1979) is the flight system Fault Protection Lead and Launch and SRC Release Mission Phase lead at Lockheed Martin on the OSIRIS-REx asteroid sample-return mission. She was the fault protection lead on MAVEN and was a mission operations development lead on the Phoenix Mission's EDL critical mission phase.	JPL · 129073
129078 Animoo	2004 VL_{65}	Animoo, title of artistic work by Laurent "Lillo" Steidle, Swiss geologist and painter	JPL · 129078
129082 Oliviabillett	2004 VK_{76}	Olivia Billett (born 1980) is the flight system Lead Software Systems Engineer, Science Mission Phase lead and flight system CPE delegate at Lockheed Martin on the OSIRIS-REx asteroid sample-return mission. She previously served as the SSE on the MAVEN mission, and supported multiple interplanetary missions within Mission Operations.	JPL · 129082
129092 Snowdonia	2004 WB_{10}	Snowdon, the highest peak in Wales	JPL · 129092
129095 Martyschmitzer	2004 XC_{1}	Martin Schmitzer (born 1970) is the RF Subsystem Lead for the OSIRIS-REx asteroid sample-return mission. He served as the RF lead for the GRAIL mission, MRO and Odyssey Mars missions, and Spitzer Space Telescope and was a team member on the Stardust comet sample return mission and 1998 Mars Surveyor Program.	JPL · 129095
129096 Andrewleung	2004 XU_{1}	Andrew Leung (born 1986) is the EPS ATLO Lead for the OSIRIS-REx asteroid sample-return mission. Prior to serving in this role, he was the PDDU CPE delegate, SASM and BCM Card Lead for OSIRIS-REx, and a card level electronics engineer for the ISIS airship program.	JPL · 129096
129099 Spoelhof	2004 XU_{3}	William Spoelhof (1909–2008), American president of Calvin College (Src)	JPL · 129099
129100 Aaronammons	2004 XY_{4}	Aaron Ammons (born 1970) is the Command And Data Handling (C&DH) Certified Principal Engineer Lead for the OSIRIS-REx asteroid sample-return mission. He was a team member to the Advanced Programs Low Power Avionics study and on the C&DH team for the GRAIL mission.	JPL · 129100

== 129101–129200 ==
back to top

Named minor planet	Provisional	This minor planet was named for...	Ref · Catalog
129101 Geoffcollyer	2004 XF_{6}	Geoff Collyer (born 1958), Canadian computer scientist	JPL · 129101
129102 Charliecamarotte	2004 XO_{9}	Charles Camarotte (born 1953) is the Lockheed Martin Power Systems Lead for the OSIRIS-REx asteroid sample-return mission. He was also the C&DH Lead for OSIRIS-REx, as well as the C&DH Lead for the Juno Mission, and a flight team member of the Tethered Satellite mission.	JPL · 129102
129108 Kristianwaldorff	2004 XO_{24}	Kristian Waldorff is the flight system GN&C LIDAR CPE at Lockheed Martin for the OSIRIS-REx asteroid sample-return mission. He was a Payload Accommodation Engineer on the MAVEN mission and was on the Electrical System Engineering teams on the GRAIL and Phoenix missions.	JPL · 129108
129114 Oliverwalthall	2004 XZ_{72}	Oliver Walthall (born 1972) is the LIDAR algorithm subject matter expert at Lockheed Martin for the OSIRIS-REx asteroid sample-return mission. He was also a Guidance, Navigation and Control engineer on the MAVEN and Orion programs.	JPL · 129114
129119 Ericmuhle	2004 XA_{111}	Eric Muhle (born 1981) is a Guidance, Navigation and Control engineer at Lockheed Martin on the OSIRIS-REx asteroid sample-return mission, responsible for momentum management. He also served in GN&C Operations at LM IS&GS.	JPL · 129119
129125 Chrisvoth	2004 XA_{162}	Chris Voth (born 1965) is the Guidance, Navigation and Control Subsystem Lead for OSIRIS-REx asteroid sample-return mission and the Subsystem CPE. He was also the attitude determination lead on Juno and other Lockheed Martin SES space missions.	JPL · 129125
129137 Hippolochos	2005 AP_{27}	Hippolochos, son of Antimachos, a Trojan warrior from Greek mythology. He was killed by Agamemnon.	JPL · 129137
129138 Williamfrost	2005 AN_{38}	William A. Frost (born 1976) is the Lockheed Martin system test engineering lead for the OSIRIS-REx asteroid sample-return mission. Prior to serving in this role, he supported the MAVEN mission to Mars, the GRAIL lunar mission, the GLM program and the TIROS program.	JPL · 129138
129146 Stevenglenn	2005 CF_{38}	Steven J. Glenn (born 1961) is the Lockheed Martin operations lead for the OSIRIS-REx asteroid sample-return mission. He has worked on many missions, including Magellan, Transfer Orbit Stage, Mars Global Surveyor, Mars Climate Orbiter, Genesis, MRO, Defense Systems, MER, MSL, GRAIL and MAVEN.	JPL · 129146
129148 Sheilahaggard	2005 ET_{49}	Sheila D. Gray Haggard (born 1971) is a Lockheed Martin test engineer for the OSIRIS-REx asteroid sample-return mission, responsible for development of system verification tests. She has worked many other NASA missions including MGS, Stardust, Odyssey, Spitzer, Genesis, MRO, Grail, MAVEN and InSight.	JPL · 129148
129149 Richwitherspoon	2005 EP_{51}	Richard A. Witherspoon (born 1981) is the Lockheed Martin lead electrical test conductor for the OSIRIS-REx asteroid sample-return mission. He also worked at Surrey Spacecraft Technologies.	JPL · 129149
129151 Angelaboggs	2005 EE_{99}	Angela Boggs (born 1978) is the Lockheed Martin Simulation Software Lead for the OSIRIS-REx asteroid sample-return mission. She was also the Simulation Software Lead for the Mars Atmosphere and Volatile Evolution Mission.	JPL · 129151
129152 Jaystpierre	2005 EQ_{133}	Jay St. Pierre (born 1969) is the Lockheed Martin Guidance Navigation and Control (GNC) Flight and Simulation Software Lead for the OSIRIS-REx asteroid sample-return mission. He was the GNC Subsystem Lead on the Juno Mission and was a GNC analyst and software developer for the Mars Reconnaissance Orbiter.	JPL · 129152
129154 Georgesondecker	2005 EG_{188}	George Ralph Sondecker IV (born 1986), the original Lead Student Engineer at the Massachusetts Institute of Technology	JPL · 129154
129158 Michaelmellman	2005 FD_{8}	Michael J. Mellman (born 1977) is the Lockheed Martin electrical ground equipment lead and test engineer for the OSIRIS-REx asteroid sample-return mission. He was also a shop lead for an electronics laboratory and a surveyor.	JPL · 129158
129160 Ericpeters	2005 GH_{41}	Eric Peters (born 1989) worked as a student engineer at Massachusetts Institute of Technology, where he designed and tested a preliminary structural model for the student-built Regolith X-ray Imaging Spectrometer aboard the OSIRIS-REx asteroid sample-return mission.	JPL · 129160
129161 Mykallefevre	2005 GP_{64}	Mykal Lefevre (born 1986) is the Mission Operations System Lead for the OSIRIS-REx asteroid sample-return mission. She was also instrumental in the MAVEN Mars orbit insertion sequence development and implementation teams.	JPL · 129161
129165 Kevinstout	2005 GP_{113}	Kevin Dale Stout (born 1988) worked as a student engineer at the Massachusetts Institute of Technology, where he developed a thermal design and thermal control system for the student-built Regolith X-ray Imaging Spectrometer aboard the OSIRIS-REx asteroid sample-return mission.	JPL · 129165
129167 Dianelambert	2005 JZ_{18}	Diane S. Doran-Lambert (born 1981) worked on the OSIRIS-REx asteroid sample-return mission as a Stereophotoclinometry Scientist contributing to the testing of mission-critical software and the development of Digital Terrain Models	JPL · 129167
129172 Jodizareski	2005 JP_{137}	Jodi Zareski (born 1982) is a central member of the Lockheed Martin Mission Operations Development team for the OSIRIS-REx asteroid sample-return mission. She has been the primary operations test lead and block development engineer.	JPL · 129172
129173 Mattgoman	2005 JG_{139}	Matt Goman (born 1979) is the Lockheed Martin Operations Ground System Development Lead for the OSIRIS-REx asteroid sample-return mission telemetry systems and tools. He was also Ground System Development Lead and tools engineer for the MAVEN and InSight missions.	JPL · 129173
129176 Gerardcarter	2005 LM_{2}	Gerard Carter (born 1958) is the Lockheed Martin Quality Engineering Lead for the OSIRIS-REx asteroid sample-return mission. Prior to serving in this role, he was the QE Lead for the MAVEN Mars Orbiter Mission and several other deep space missions.	JPL · 129176
129177 Jeanneeha	2005 LN_{2}	Jeanne Eha (born 1960) is the Lockheed Martin Lead Parts Materials and Processes (PMP) Engineer for the OSIRIS-REx asteroid sample-return mission. She was also the PMP Engineer for the MAVEN Mars Mission, the Juno and GRAIL missions.	JPL · 129177
129185 Jonburroughs	2005 LO_{47}	Jonathan C. Burroughs (born 1982), the Lead Mission Assurance Engineer for the OSIRIS-REx asteroid sample-return mission.	JPL · 129185
129186 Joshgrindlay	2005 LJ_{48}	Jonathan E. Grindlay (born 1944), a high energy astrophysicist and Professor at the Harvard College Observatory.	JPL · 129186
129187 Danielalfred	2005 LB_{50}	Daniel Alfred (born 1985) was the lead thermal engineer for the OCAMS camera system of the OSIRIS-REx asteroid sample-return mission	JPL · 129187
129188 Dangallagher	2005 MM_{4}	Daniel Gallagher (born 1980) is a Multimedia Producer at NASA's Goddard Spaceflight Center. He is supporting the OSIRIS-REx asteroid sample-return mission with videos, animations and other media products	JPL · 129188
129196 Mitchbeiser	2005 MV_{52}	Mitchell Beiser (born 1991) worked as a mechanical design engineer on the OSIRIS-REx asteroid sample-return mission OCAMS camera system. He is passionate about the outdoors and the night sky.	JPL · 129196

== 129201–129300 ==
back to top

Named minor planet	Provisional	This minor planet was named for...	Ref · Catalog
129201 Brandenallen	2005 NF_{10}	Branden Allen (born 1979), an astronomer at the Harvard College Observatory	JPL · 129201
129209 Robertburt	2005 NP_{60}	Robert Burt (born 1964), a longtime aerospace electronics engineer at Space Dynamics Laboratory, worked as the lead detector electronics designer on the OCAMS camera system of the OSIRIS-REx asteroid sample-return mission. He was supported in this effort by his wife and five children.	JPL · 129209
129214 Gordoncasto	2005 NW_{69}	Gordon Casto (born 1960), the OSIRIS-REx Visible and near InfraRed Spectrometer (OVIRS) mechanical lead, ensuring the instrument can operate properly under cryogenic conditions.	JPL · 129214
129216 Chloecastle	2005 NQ_{82}	Chloe Castle (born 1990) worked as a Hofstadter Analytical Services test engineer on the OCAMS camera system for the OSIRIS-REx asteroid sample-return mission, her first space mission.	JPL · 129216
129234 Silly	2005 PS_{5}	Didier Silly (born 1950), French optician and amateur astronomer, friend of the discoverer Bernard Christophe	JPL · 129234
129259 Tapolca	2005 QD_{75}	The town of Tapolca, birthplace of Hungarian astronomer Dorottya Szám who co-discovered this minor planet	JPL · 129259
129277 Jianxinchen	2005 RC_{10}	Jianxin Chen (born 1963) worked as the OSIRIS-REx asteroid sample-return mission OCAMS Camera Control Module electronics architect and the FPGA designer. He also designed the Ion and Electron Spectrometer FPGA and controller on the Rosetta mission, and the C&DH module for the Ralph camera on New Horizons.	JPL · 129277

== 129301–129400 ==
back to top

Named minor planet	Provisional	This minor planet was named for...	Ref · Catalog
129307 Tomconnors	2005 SL_{190}	Thomas Connors (born 1959) served as a lead mechanical engineer on the OSIRIS-REx asteroid sample-return mission OCAMS camera. He also worked as systems engineer on the LBTI and Kepler Technology Demonstration projects, as well as future telescope architecture studies.	JPL · 129307
129312 Drouetdaubigny	2005 SH_{214}	Christian Drouet d'Aubigny (born 1972) served as the deputy instrument scientist and lead optical designer for OSIRIS-REx Asteroid Sample Return Mission OCAMS camera. He also worked on technology development for terahertz imaging radars, imaging spectrometers, and for NASA's proposed Terrestrial Planet Finder.	JPL · 129312
129314 Dathongolish	2005 SM_{220}	Dathon Golish (born 1979) was the lead image analyst on the OSIRIS-REx asteroid sample-return mission OCAMS camera. He also worked on terahertz astronomical receivers for telescopes in Arizona and at the South Pole, as well as image formation software for the DARPA AWARE gigapixel camera.	JPL · 129314
129318 Sarahschlieder	2005 TC_{23}	Sarah Elizabeth Schlieder (born 1995) is a science communications specialist. She worked as a Public Affairs Specialist for the OSIRIS-REx asteroid sample-return mission.	JPL · 129318
129321 Tannercampbell	2005 TS_{24}	Tanner S. Campbell (born 1991) worked on the OSIRIS-REx asteroid sample-return mission as a Stereophotoclinometry Scientist and Programmer, working to test and develop the mission-critical digital terrain mapping software	JPL · 129321
129324 Johnweirich	2005 TH_{72}	John R. Weirich (born 1979) is a researcher at the Planetary Science Institute. Currently his research focus is testing and preparing code that will be used to build a shape model of asteroid Bennu for the OSIRIS-REx asteroid sample-return mission. He also conducts age dating on impact-melted meteorites	JPL · 129324
129325 Jedhancock	2005 TW_{72}	Jed Hancock (born 1977) served as the detector assembly lead on the OSIRIS-REx asteroid sample-return mission OCAMS camera. He was Civil Space Division director at the Utah State University Space Dynamics Laboratory and managed development of camera assemblies on NASA's Ionospheric Connect Explorer mission.	JPL · 129325
129327 Davehamara	2005 TG_{134}	Dave Hamara (born 1960) served as lead electronic designer for the Camera Control Module on the OSIRIS-REx asteroid sample-return mission OCAMS camera. He worked with gamma ray and neutron instruments and data on Mars Odyssey, Mars Phoenix, Messenger and Lunar Reconnaissance Orbiter missions	JPL · 129327
129328 Loriharrison	2005 TZ_{171}	Lori Harrison (born 1978) worked as the Integration and Test Lead Engineer for the OSIRIS-REx asteroid sample-return mission OCAMS camera. She was a Test Engineer for the Phoenix Mars Mission. She enjoys hiking, traveling, taking pictures in space and playing the bagpipes.	JPL · 129328
129330 Karlharshman	2005 UH_{18}	Karl Harshman (born 1957) served as the lead software engineer on the OCAMS camera and as the Science Processing Operations Center Manager for the OSIRIS-REx asteroid sample-return mission.	JPL · 129330
129332 Markhunten	2005 UJ_{50}	Mark Hunten (born 1954) worked as a senior electrical engineer on the OSIRIS-REx asteroid sample-return mission OCAMS camera. He also worked on the Gemini 8-m telescopes and the MONSOON CCD and IR array controller.	JPL · 129332
129333 Ashleylancaster	2005 UR_{55}	Ashley Lancaster (born 1990) worked as a test engineer on the OSIRIS-REx asteroid sample-return mission OCAMS camera. She also worked on the ATST Solar Telescope.	JPL · 129333
129335 Edwardlittle	2005 UM_{70}	Edward Little (born 1978) worked as a calibration and test engineer on the OSIRIS-REx asteroid sample-return mission OCAMS camera. He is an avid amateur astronomer and optical designer.	JPL · 129335
129338 Andrewlowman	2005 UZ_{74}	Andrew Lowman (born 1967) worked as an optical designer on OSIRIS-REx asteroid sample-return mission OCAMS camera. He also worked as an optical engineer on the Lick Automated Planet Finder, SkyMapper, the Magdalena Ridge telescopes and on the Optical Navigation Camera for the Mars Reconnaissance Orbiter	JPL · 129338
129342 Ependes	2005 VA_{4}	The Swiss village of Épendes, located in the Canton of Fribourg	JPL · 129342

== 129401–129500 ==
back to top

Named minor planet	Provisional	This minor planet was named for...	Ref · Catalog
129452 Ashleydawn	1991 TJ_{16}	Ashley Dawn Leonty (b. 1987), the daughter-in-law of the discoverer.	IAU · 129452
129453 Madeleinenettie	1991 TO_{16}	Madeleine Nettie Senegas-Lowe (b. 2023), the first granddaughter of the discoverer.	IAU · 129453

== 129501–129600 ==
back to top

Named minor planet	Provisional	This minor planet was named for...	Ref · Catalog
129550 Fukuten	1996 TN_{14}	Fukushima Tenmon Doukoukai is a local astronomical association with 40 members. It has hosted star-parties and photo exhibitions for Fukushima citizens since its establishment in 1968.	JPL · 129550
129555 Armazones	1996 UB_{3}	Cerro Armazones, the Chilean mountain selected as location for the Extremely Large Telescope by the European Southern Observatory (ESO) in 2010	JPL · 129555
129561 Chuhachi	1997 CS_{21}	Chūhachi Ninomiya (1866–1936), the first Japanese to fly a propeller-driven model aircraft	JPL · 129561
129564 Christy	1997 ER_{40}	James W. Christy (born 1938), American astronomer who discovered Pluto's moon Charon	JPL · 129564
129595 Vand	1997 VD	Vladimír Vand (1911–1968), Czech astronomer and molecular spectroscopist	JPL · 129595

== 129601–129700 ==
back to top

Named minor planet	Provisional	This minor planet was named for...	Ref · Catalog
There are no named minor planets in this number range

== 129701–129800 ==
back to top

Named minor planet	Provisional	This minor planet was named for...	Ref · Catalog
129743 Grimaldi	1999 CF_{82}	Francesco Maria Grimaldi (1618–1663) was one of the first telescopic observers of the Moon. He wrote De lumine, the first treatise on the wave nature of light.	IAU · 129743
129773 Catmerrill	1999 JJ_{1}	Catherine Merrill (born 1979) was the Lead Systems Engineer and Deputy Program Manager for the OCAMS camera on the OSIRIS-REx asteroid sample-return mission, involved in all aspects of its development and delivery. She is presently the project manager of the primary mirror system for the Giant Magellan Telescope	JPL · 129773

== 129801–129900 ==
back to top

Named minor planet	Provisional	This minor planet was named for...	Ref · Catalog
129801 Tommcmahon	1999 KB_{1}	Tom McMahon (born 1962) was electronics lead on the OCAMS camera for the OSIRIS-REx asteroid sample-return mission. He also served as project manager for the Large Binocular Telescope Interferometer and systems engineer for the Multi-band Imaging Spectrometer (MIPS) on the Spitzer Space Telescope	JPL · 129801
129807 Stefanodougherty	1999 KV_{17}	Stefan O'Dougherty (born 1998) worked as a calibration and test engineer on the OCAMS camera system of the OSIRIS-REx asteroid sample-return mission.	JPL · 129807
129811 Stacyoliver	1999 LY_{33}	Stacy Oliver (born 1969) worked as information technologies and documentation specialist on the OSIRIS-REx asteroid sample-return mission.	JPL · 129811
129876 Stevenpeterson	1999 RA_{254}	Steven Peterson (born 1953) worked as an optical systems calibration and test engineer on the OCAMS camera of the OSIRIS-REx asteroid sample-return mission. He also worked at Kitt Peak National Observatory and served as an officer of the Tucson Amateur Astronomy Association	JPL · 129876
129879 Tishasaltzman	1999 SV_{4}	Tisha Saltzman (born 1966) served as the business manager on the OCAMS camera of the OSIRIS-REx asteroid sample-return mission. She also worked on the Phoenix Mars mission SSI and Ground Operations teams	JPL · 129879
129881 Chucksee	1999 SK_{16}	Charles See (born 1956) worked as a calibration and test engineer on the OCAMS camera of the OSIRIS-REx asteroid sample-return mission. He also filled many roles on the Descent Imager/Spectral Radiometer team on the Cassini-Huygens probe to Titan, including systems, calibration and test lead, and data analyst.	JPL · 129881
129882 Ustica	1999 TO	Ustica, a volcanic island 70 km north of Palermo, Sicily, famous for being the first Marine Protected Area in Italy (1986).	JPL · 129882
129898 Sanfordselznick	1999 TP_{39}	Sanford Selznick (born 1969) was the telemetry lead for the Science Processing Operations Center of the OSIRIS-REx asteroid sample-return mission. He also designed the commanding and telemetry interface used for the Mars Odyssey mission, the Mars Phoenix mission, and contributed to OSIRIS-REx OCAMS camera hardware development.	JPL · 129898

== 129901–130000 ==
back to top

Named minor planet	Provisional	This minor planet was named for...	Ref · Catalog
129954 Corksauve	1999 TA_{236}	Corwynn Sauve (born 1961) was as a mechanical designer on the OCAMS camera suite of the OSIRIS-REx asteroid sample-return mission	JPL · 129954
129955 Eriksyrstad	1999 TY_{248}	Erik Syrstad (born 1978) was the detector assembly contamination control lead for the OCAMS camera of the OSIRIS-REx asteroid sample-return mission. As an instrument scientist at the Utah State University Space Dynamics Laboratory, he was the program manager for the FUV spectrograph camera on NASA's ICON mission.	JPL · 129955
129962 Williamverts	1999 TY_{294}	William Verts (born 1968) worked as a senior mechanical designer on the OCAMS camera of the OSIRIS-REx asteroid sample-return mission. He also helped design TEGA II on the Phoenix Mars Mission and Mars Polar Lander and GRS on the Odyssey Mars Mission	JPL · 129962
129963 Marvinwalthall	1999 TZ_{296}	Marvin Walthall (born 1983) worked as an optical and stray light analyst on the OCAMS camera of the OSIRIS-REx asteroid sample-return mission	JPL · 129963
129966 Michaelward	1999 UU_{5}	Michael Ward (born 1964) served as the configuration manager on the OCAMS camera of the OSIRIS-REx asteroid sample-return mission. He also worked as mission operations manager for GRS on Mars Odyssey	JPL · 129966
129968 Mitchwhiteley	1999 UA_{15}	Mitchell Whiteley (born 1972) designed the camera FPGA read-out electronics on the OCAMS camera of the OSIRIS-REx asteroid sample-return mission. He also designed the SOFIE Sun Tracker for NASA-AIM and served as the USURF-SDL Digital Imaging Space Camera lead	JPL · 129968
129969 Bradwilliams	1999 UV_{16}	Bradley Williams (born 1989) worked as a systems engineer on the OCAMS camera of the OSIRIS-REx asteroid sample-return mission. He also worked on the Phoenix Mars mission.	JPL · 129969
129973 Michaeldaly	1999 UW_{25}	Michael Daly (born 1965) is a professor of planetary science at York University and is the lead scientist for the laser altimeter of the OSIRIS-REx asteroid sample-return mission. Prior to this, he was the lead engineer for the development of Phoenix MET, Canada's first instruments to operate on the surface of Mars.	JPL · 129973
129980 Catherinejohnson	1999 UN_{42}	Catherine Johnson (born 1967) is a planetary geophysicist and a Co-Investigator for the OSIRIS-REx asteroid sample-return mission and for the InSight mission to Mars. She was a Participating Scientist on the MESSENGER mission to Mercury and is a Fellow of the American Geophysical Union	JPL · 129980
129982 Jeffseabrook	1999 UJ_{45}	Jeff Seabrook (born 1976) is part of the altimetry team developing the capability to generate topography and shape models from the laser altimeter of the OSIRIS-REx asteroid sample-return mission. Prior to this, he was a graduate student who developed and deployed atmospheric ozone lidars, and part of the MET team on the Phoenix Mars Mission.	JPL · 129982
129985 Jimfreemantle	1999 UP_{51}	Jim Freemantle (born 1958) is the Project Manager for the OLA Science Team on the OSIRIS-REx asteroid sample-return mission. He was also the Project Manager for the Canadian MET Sensor on board the Phoenix Mars Lander. He has had a long career using remote sensing to monitor environmental change	JPL · 129985
129988 Camerondickinson	1999 VH_{4}	Cameron S. Dickinson (born 1974) is the Technical Lead for the laser altimeter of the OSIRIS-REx asteroid sample-return mission. Previously, Cameron was the Operations Lead for the Phoenix Mars Lander Meteorological Station	JPL · 129988

back to top

Preceded by 128,001–129,000	Meanings of minor-planet names List of minor planets: 129,001–130,000	Succeeded by 130,001–131,000
