= Prush =

- Village
- Location within Albania
- Coordinates: 41°19′N 19°44′E
- Country: Albania
- County: Tirana
- Municipality: Tirana
- Administrative unit: Vaqarr
- Time zone: UTC+1 (CET)
  - Summer (DST): UTC+2 (CEST)

Prush ('something that is burned' or 'ember' in Albanian) is a village in the former municipality of Vaqarr in Tirana County, Albania. At the 2015 local government reform it became part of the municipality Tirana.
