= Kibe (surname) =

Kibe is a surname. Notable people with the surname include:

- Akira Kibe (born 1976), Japanese mixed martial artist
- Madhav Vinayak Kibe (1877–?), Indian scholar
- Petro Kasui Kibe (1587–1639), Japanese Christian and a Jesuit priest
- Shigeno Kibe (1903–1980), Japanese aviator
