= Mikekado Station =

Railway station in Buzen, Fukuoka Prefecture, Japan

Mikekado Station 三毛門駅
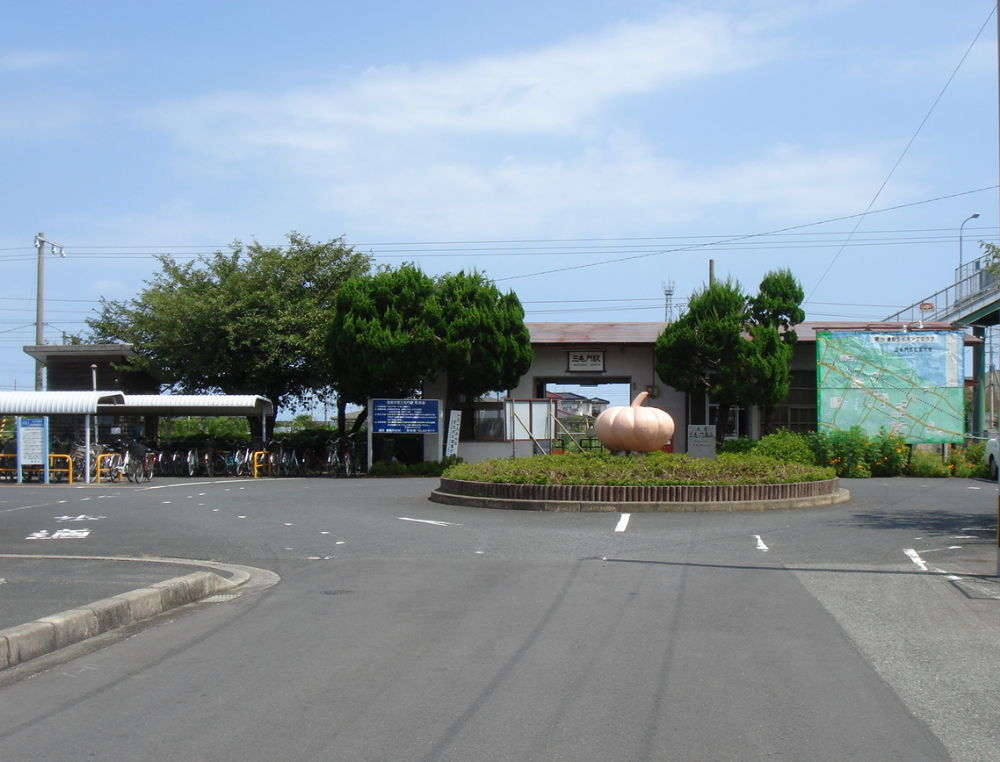
- Mikekado Station in August 2006

General information
- Location: 715 Mikekado, Buzen-shi, Fukuoka-ken 828-0031; Japan
- Coordinates: 33°36′54″N 131°09′20″E
- Operator: JR Kyushu
- Line: ■ Nippō Main Line
- Distance: 48.0 km from Kokura
- Platforms: 1 island platform
- Tracks: 2

Other information
- Status: Unstaffed
- Website: Official website

History
- Opened: 11 February 1956

Passengers
- FY2020: 252 daily

Services
Preceding station	JR Kyushu	Following station
Yoshitomi towards Kagoshima	Nippō Main Line	Unoshima towards Kokura
Location
- Location within Fukuoka Prefecture Location within Japan

Mikekado Station (三毛門駅, Mikekado-eki) is a passenger railway station located in the city of Buzen, Fukuoka Prefecture, Japan. It is operated by JR Kyushu.

== Lines ==
The station is served by the Nippō Main Line and is located 48.0 km from the starting point of the line at Kokura.

== Layout ==
The station consists of one island platform serving two tracks connected to the station building by a footbridge. The station is unattended. In the station square, there is a statue of a Mikekado pumpkin, a specialty of this area.

=== Platforms ===
1	■ ■ Nippō Main Line	for Yukuhashi and Kokura
2	■ ■ Nippō Main Line	for Nakatsu and Yanagigaura

== History ==
The station was opened 11 February 1956 as an additional station on the existing track of the Nippō Main Line.

== Passenger statistics ==
In fiscal 2020, there was a daily average of 252 boarding passengers at this station.

== Surrounding area ==
- Buzen City Mikekado Elementary School

== See also ==
- List of railway stations in Japan
