= Ukita Kōkichi =

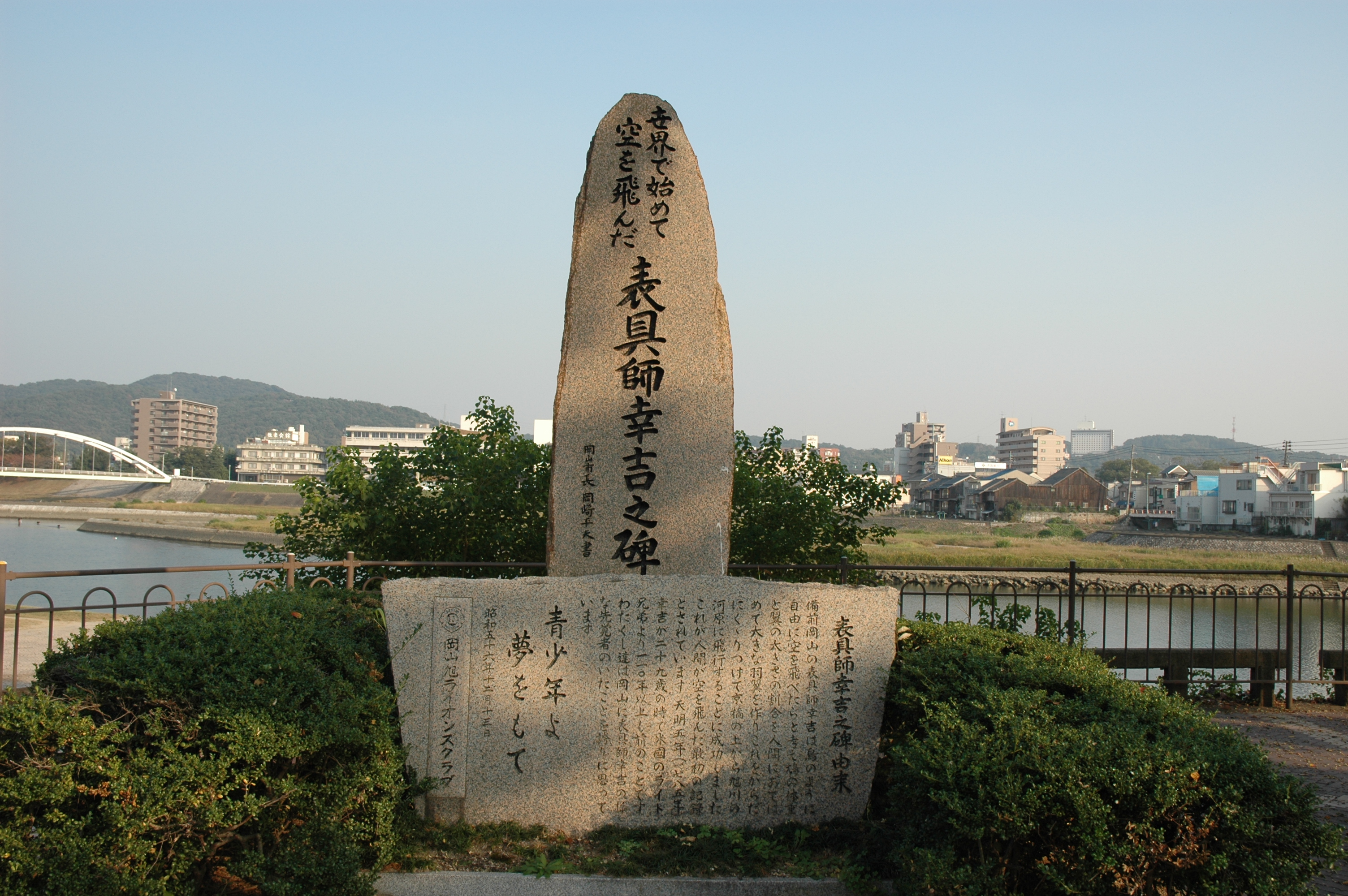
Monument to Kōkichi beside the Asahi River in Okayama

Ukita Kōkichi (浮田 幸吉; 1757 – 1847?) was a Japanese aviation pioneer who experimented with artificial wings and is considered the first Japanese person to fly. He is also called Kōkichi the Birdman (鳥人 幸吉, Chōjin Kōkichi), Kōkichi the Papermaker (表具師 幸吉, Hyōgu-shi Kōkichi), Sakuraya Kōkichi (櫻屋 幸吉), Bizen'ya Kōkichi (備前屋 幸吉), or Binkōsai (備考斎).

== Biography ==
Ukita was born in 1757 during the Edo period in Hachihama, Kojima District, Bizen Province (now Hachihama, Tamano, Okayama) as the second son of Ukita (or Sakuraya) Seibei (浮田（櫻屋）清兵衛). His father died when Ukita was seven years old, after which he moved to the city of Okayama and apprenticed to a papermaker (hyogu-shi, a maker of shōji or fusuma).

Interested in how birds fly, Ukita researched and concluded that by "computing the ratio of the wing's surface area to the body weight and using that ratio to create artificial wings, a human, too, will be able to fly like a bird."

He used his skill in papermaking to create wings, constructing the delicate ribs from bamboo, covering them with paper and fabric, and varnishing the surface with lacquer from Japanese persimmons. After discarding many prototypes, Ukita attempted to fly from a bridge over the Asahi River in the summer of 1785. Some references assert that he glided several meters; others that he simply fell. Immediately after his attempt, Ukita was arrested by samurai of the Okayama Domain and exiled from the domain by Lord Ikeda Harumasa (池田治政). His contemporary, scholar/poet Kan Sazan (菅茶山), referred to this event in his writing.

Ukita then moved to the town of Sunpu in Suruga province (now Shizuoka, Shizuoka) and opened a cotton shop under the name Bizen'ya Kōkichi. Once the business was established, he turned the shop over to his nephew and became a dental technician under the name Binkōsai, earning his reputation with excellent dentures.

Little is known about his later years. One theory is that Ukita flew again in Sunpu and was executed for the crime of rioting. Another is that Ukita moved to Mitsuke in Tōtōmi Province (now Iwata, Shizuoka), where he quietly spent the rest of his life with his wife and children and died peacefully in 1847 at age 92.

His tomb is at Daiken-ji Temple (大見寺) in Iwata, Shizuoka Prefecture. His posthumous (Buddhist) name is 釋帝玄居士.

Incidentally, Lord Ikeda's descendant, Ikeda Takamasa (池田隆政), cancelled the exile order in 1997.

== See also ==
- Abbas Ibn Firnas
- Eilmer of Malmesbury
- Hezarfen Ahmet Celebi
- Carl Friedrich Meerwein
- Albrecht Berblinger
- Chūhachi Ninomiya - 19th-century Japanese aviation pioneer.
