= Hiroshi Yagi =

Japanese baseball player and coach

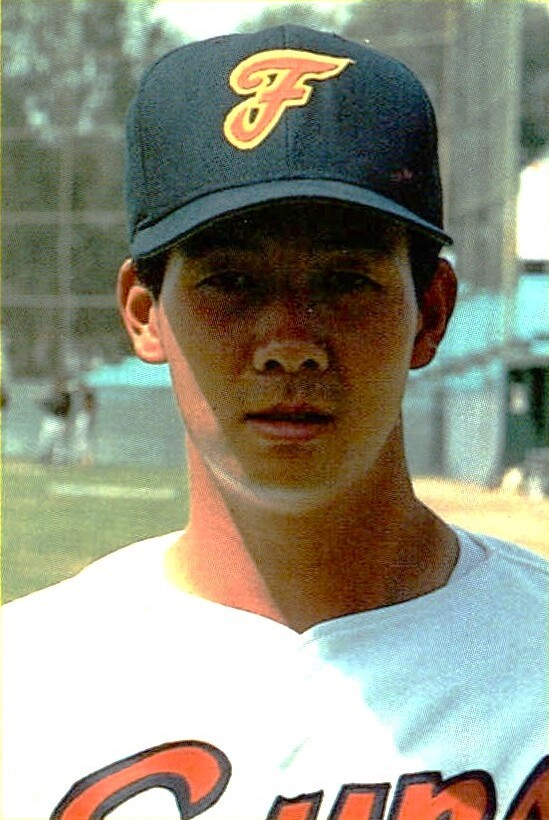
- Yagi with the Fresno Suns in 1988
- Coach / Infielder / Outfielder
- Born: June 8, 1965 (age 60); Tamano, Okayama, Japan
- Batted: Right Threw: Right

NPB debut
- May 12, 1987, for the Hanshin Tigers

Last NPB appearance
- October 10, 2004, for the Hanshin Tigers

NPB statistics
- Batting average: .247
- Home runs: 126
- Runs batted in: 383
- Stats at Baseball Reference

Teams
- As player: Hanshin Tigers (1987–2004); As coach: Hanshin Tigers (2009–2015); Hokkaido Nippon-Ham Fighters (2023–2025)

Career highlights and awards
- JCB Most Exciting Player Award (1990); NPB All-Star (1992)

Hiroshi Yagi (八木 裕; born June 8, 1965) is a retired Japanese baseball player for the Hanshin Tigers. He was an All-Star in 1990 and a member of the Tigers' 2003 championship team. In the later years of his career, he was known as the team's "God of Pinch Hitting". After retiring at the end of the 2004 season, he spent some time in the media before becoming a hitting coach for Hanshin in 2009. He was named as the hitting coach for the club's second team for the 2015 season. Yagi was hospitalized with swelling and bleeding on the brain after being hit in the head by a broken bat while in the dugout during a game on September 9, 2025.
