= Juozas Lubas =

Lithuanian footballer

Personal information
- Full name: Juozas Lubas
- Date of birth: 22 May 2002 (age 24)
- Place of birth: Vilnius, Lithuania
- Height: 1.86 m (6 ft 1 in)
- Position: Left winger

Team information
- Current team: DFK Dainava
- Number: 11

Youth career
- –2019: Kauno Žalgiris

Senior career*
Years	Team	Apps	(Gls)
2019	Stumbras	0	(0)
2019–2024	Riteriai	15	(0)
2019–2022	→ Riteriai B (loan)	?	(?)
2022	→ Jonava (loan)	15	(2)
2023	→ Džiugas Telšiai (loan)	28	(2)
2024–	Egnatia	10	(0)
2024	→ Besa Kavajë (loan)	0	(0)
2024–	Ferizaj		
2025	FK TransINVEST		
2025–	DFK Dainava	14	(1)

International career^{‡}
	Lithuania U16	?	(?)
	Lithuania U17	5	(0)
2019	Lithuania U19	4	(0)
2022	Lithuania U21	2	(0)
- * Club domestic league appearances and goals as of 10 November 2025 ‡ National team caps and goals as of 2 May 2024

Juozas Lubas (born 22 May 2002) is a Lithuanian professional footballer who plays as a defender and winger for Lithuanian Dainava Club in the A Lyga.

== Honours ==
Egnatia

- Albanian Cup: 2023–24
