= 2023–24 Albanian Cup =

Kupa e Shqipërisë

Tournament details
- Country: Albania
- Teams: 44

Final positions
- Champions: Egnatia
- Runners-up: Kukësi

Tournament statistics
- Matches played: 50
- Goals scored: 141 (2.82 per match)
- Top goal scorer(s): Bekim Balaj; Bobby Clement; Bruno Gomes; Mamady Oulare; Jurguens Montenegro (3 goals each)

The 2023–24 Albanian Cup (Albanian: Kupa e Shqipërisë) was the seventy-second season of Albania's annual cup competition, the Albanian Cup. There were 44 participating teams. The winners qualified for the 2024–25 UEFA Conference League first qualifying round.

Egnatia were the defending champions, and retained their title after defeating Kukësi 1–0 in the final. It was the club's second Albanian Cup title overall.

== Participating teams ==
Kategoria Superiore; The 10 clubs of the 2023–24 season	Kategoria e Parë; Twelve clubs of the 2023–24 season	Kategoria e Dytë; Twenty-two clubs of the 2023–24 season
Dinamo City; Egnatia; Erzeni; Laçi; Partizani; Kukësi; Skënderbeu; Teuta; Tirana; Vllaznia	Apolonia; Besa; Burreli; Bylis; Elbasani; Flamurtari; Kastrioti; Korabi; Lushnja; Luzi 2008; Tomori; Vora	Adriatiku; Albanët; Besëlidhja; Butrinti; Delvina; Devolli; Gramshi; Iliria; Labëria; Luftëtari; Maliqi; Murlani; Naftëtari; Oriku; Pogradeci; Shënkolli; Shkumbini; Sopoti; Tërbuni; Turbina; Valbona; Veleçiku

== Format and seeding ==
Teams will enter the competition at various stages, as follows:

- First phase (one-legged fixtures)
  - Preliminary round: eight teams from Kategoria e Dytë will start the tournament
  - Round of 64: the four winners will be joined by 14 Kategoria e Dytë teams, 12 Kategoria e Parë teams, and 2 teams from Kategoria Superiore
  - Round of 32: the 16 winners will face each other
- Second phase
  - Round of 16 (one-legged): the eight winners will be joined by Kategoria Superiore clubs, seeded 1–8
  - Quarter-finals (two-legged): the eight winners will face each other
  - Semi-finals (two-legged): the four winners will face each other
  - Final (one-legged): the two winners will face each other

== Round dates ==
Phase	Round	Clubs remaining	Clubs involved	From previous round	Entries in this round	First leg	Second leg
First stage	Preliminary round	44	8	none	8	27 September 2023	
First stage	Round of 64	40	32	4	28	17 & 18 October 2023	
First stage	Round of 32	24	16	16	none	6 December 2023	
Second stage	Round of 16	16	16	8	8	24 January 2024	
Second stage	Quarter-finals	8	8	8	none	20 & 21 February 2024	5 & 6 March 2024
Second stage	Semi-finals	4	4	4	none	3 April 2024	24 April 2024
Second stage	Final	2	2	2	none	14 May 2024	

== Preliminary round ==
A total of eight teams from Kategoria e Dytë competed in this round, four of which advanced.

Team 1	Score	Team 2
Iliria (III)	2−0	Adriatiku (III)
Murlani (III)	2−2 (a.e.t.) (8−7 p)	Gramshi (III)
Shkumbini (III)	2−1	Albanët (III)
Delvina (III)	3−0	Maliqi (III)

28 September 2023	Iliria	2−0	Adriatiku	Redi Maloku Stadium, Fushë-Krujë
15:00 CEST	Stafa 18'; Villarreal 31'	Report		Referee: Armir Qaushi

Iliria advanced to the round of 64.

27 September 2023	Murlani	2−2 (a.e.t.) (8−7 p)	Gramshi	Barbullush Stadium, Barbullush
15:00 CEST	Markaj 41'; Djepaxhia 79'	Report	Latifi 57' (pen.); Do Nascimento 81'	Referee: Gerard Çokaj

Murlani advanced to the round of 64.

27 September 2023	Shkumbini	2−1	Albanët	Shkumbini Stadium, Peqin
15:00 CEST	Teqja 40'; Xhelili 90'	Report	Dumoye 26'	Referee: Rigert Zeneli

Shkumbini advanced to the round of 64.

27 September 2023	Delvina	3−0; Awarded	Maliqi	Panajot Pano Stadium, Delvinë
15:00 CEST		Report

Delvina advanced to the round of 64.

== Round of 64 ==
A total of 32 teams (4 winners from the preliminary round, 14 teams from Kategoria e Dytë, 12 teams from Kategoria e Parë and 2 Kategoria Superiore teams) competed in this round, 16 of which advanced to the second round.

Team 1	Score	Team 2
Bylis (II)	4−1	Murlani (III)
Kastrioti (II)	3−2	Shkumbini (III)
Skënderbeu (I)	3−0	Delvina (III)
Dinamo City (I)	3−0	Iliria (III)
Flamurtari (II)	2−0	Luftëtari (III)
Tomori (II)	1−0	Shënkolli (III)
Korabi (II)	4−0	Devolli (III)
Apolonia (II)	4−0	Naftëtari (III)
Luzi 2008 (II)	3−2	Butrinti (III)
Besa (II)	3−2	Sopoti (III)
Lushnja (II)	3−0	Labëria (III)
Burreli (II)	1−1 (a.e.t.) (5−4 p)	Valbona (III)
Oriku (III)	2−0	Pogradeci (III)
Turbina (III)	4−0	Veleçiku (III)
Besëlidhja (III)	0−3	Elbasani (II)
Tërbuni (III)	2−4	Vora (II)

18 October 2023	Bylis	4−1	Murlani	Adush Muça Stadium, Ballsh
13:30 CEST	Oulare 36' (pen.), 45+3' (pen.), 48'; Hodo 47'	Report	Lekaj 66' (pen.)	Referee: Klajdi Qendraj

Bylis advanced to the round of 32.

18 October 2023	Kastrioti	3−2	Shkumbini	Redi Maloku Stadium, Fushë-Krujë
13:30 CEST	Gjinaj 45'; Diamanti 53', 78'	Report	Nexha 30'; Sejdini 67'	Referee: Besnard Kaimi

Kastrioti advanced to the round of 32.

18 October 2023	Skënderbeu	3−0; Awarded	Delvina	Skënderbeu Stadium, Korçë
13:30 CEST		Report

Skënderbeu advanced to the round of 32.

18 October 2023	Dinamo City	3−0	Iliria	Kompleksi Sportiv FC Dinamo, Arbanë
13:30 CEST	Silva 51', 53'; Marku 83'	Report		Referee: Ervin Kotemelo

Dinamo City advanced to the round of 32.

17 October 2023	Flamurtari	2−0	Luftëtari	Flamurtari Stadium, Vlorë
13:00 CEST	Beqja 64'; Di Estefano 90+2'	Report		Referee: Olsi Sokoli

Flamurtari advanced to the round of 32.

18 October 2023	Tomori	1−0	Shënkolli	Tomori Stadium, Berat
13:30 CEST	Beçka 81'	Report		Referee: Xhulio Agolli

Tomori advanced to the round of 32.

18 October 2023	Korabi	4−0	Devolli	Kamëz Stadium, Kamëz
13:30 CEST	Marku 18'; Nuri 40', 42'; Kryemadhi 45+1'	Report		Referee: Gerard Çokaj

Korabi advanced to the round of 32.

18 October 2023	Apolonia	4−0	Naftëtari	Loni Papuçiu Stadium, Fier
13:30 CEST	Kaçanolli 7', 83'; Umejiego 18', 20'	Report		Referee: Erjon Bylykbashi

Apolonia advanced to the round of 32.

18 October 2023	Luzi 2008	3−2	Butrinti	Luz i Vogël Stadium, Luz i Vogël
13:30 CEST	Çuçka 22'; Hoxha 28'; Treni 90+2'	Report	Mërkuri 64' (pen.); Çulli 77'	Referee: Geisi Velçani

Luzi 2008 advanced to the round of 32.

18 October 2023	Besa	3−2	Sopoti	Kompleksi Sportiv Egnatia, Lekaj
13:30 CEST	Shehu 31'; Ajazi 38'; Xhabrahimi 81' (pen.)	Report	Goçi 8', 17' (pen.)	Referee: Egli Spahiu

Besa advanced to the round of 32.

18 October 2023	Lushnja	3−0	Labëria	Fusha e Plugut, Plug
13:30 CEST	Preknicaj 55', 73'; Gega 85'	Report		Referee: Kristi Hoxha

Lushnja advanced to the round of 32.

18 October 2023	Burreli	1−1 (a.e.t.) (5−4 p)	Valbona	Liri Ballabani Stadium, Burrel
13:30 CEST	Muriel 57'	Report	Mziu 11' (pen.)	Referee: Ditmir Grimci
	Penalties
	Torres (penalty scored); Dani (penalty scored); Muriel (penalty scored); Bubeqi (penalty missed); Ferruku (penalty scored); Kola (penalty scored)		(penalty missed) Progni; (penalty scored) Joti; (penalty scored) Zuna; (penalty scored) Kovaçi; (penalty scored) Mashi; (penalty missed) Taku

Burreli advanced to the round of 32.

18 October 2023	Oriku	2−0	Pogradeci	Orikum Stadium, Orikum
13:30 CEST	Bunkhoev 45'; Owusu 68'	Report		Referee: Rigert Zeneli

Oriku advanced to the round of 32.

18 October 2023	Turbina	4−0	Veleçiku	Nexhip Trungu Stadium, Cërrik
13:30 CEST	Gjoka 17'; Stafa 23' (o.g.); Karaj 62'; Hysa 88'	Report		Referee: Besmir Lesaj

Turbina advanced to the round of 32.

17 October 2023	Besëlidhja	0−3	Elbasani	Brian Filipi Stadium, Lezhë
13:00 CEST		Report	Rami 41'; Clement 43'; Melo 83'	Referee: Ermal Gryka

Elbasani advanced to the round of 32.

18 October 2023	Tërbuni	2−4	Vora	Ismail Xhemali Stadium, Pukë
13:30 CEST	Filipi 48'; Tabaku 77'	Report	Fejzulla 20' (pen.); Tafa 23', 45'; Qardaku 90+11'	Referee: Mario Shabanaj

Vora advanced to the round of 32.

== Round of 32 ==
The 16 winning teams from the first round competed in the second round, 8 of which advanced to the round of 16.

Team 1	Score	Team 2
Bylis (II)	2−2 (a.e.t.) (3−2 p)	Vora (II)
Kastrioti (II)	2−3	Elbasani (II)
Skënderbeu (I)	4−0	Turbina (III)
Dinamo City (I)	2−0	Oriku (III)
Flamurtari (II)	2−0	Burreli (II)
Tomori (II)	0−3	Lushnja (II)
Korabi (II)	2−2 (a.e.t.) (5−4 p)	Besa (II)
Apolonia (II)	2−1	Luzi 2008 (II)

6 December 2023	Bylis	2−2 (a.e.t.) (3−2 p)	Vora	Adush Muça Stadium, Ballsh
13:00 CET	Ruçi 62'; Kibe 68'	Report	Qardaku 51' (pen.); Vrapi 89'	Referee: Daniel Vrapi
	Penalties
	Lajthia (penalty missed); Kibe (penalty scored); Kasaj (penalty missed); Trumçi (penalty scored); Abazaj (penalty scored)		(penalty missed) Qardaku; (penalty scored) Sefa; (penalty scored) Thana; (penalty missed) Avdiu; (penalty missed) Vrapi

Bylis advanced to the round of 16.

6 December 2023	Kastrioti	2−3	Elbasani	Redi Maloku Stadium, Fushë-Krujë
13:00 CET	Çela 36' (pen.); Marinaj 56' (pen.)	Report	Clement 23', 53'; Hoxhaj 33'	Referee: Sokol Bebja

Elbasani advanced to the round of 16.

6 December 2023	Skënderbeu	4−0	Turbina	Skënderbeu Stadium, Korçë
13:00 CET	Merlim 8' (pen.), 26'; Muharem 24'; Ajine 44'	Report		Referee: Erald Demiraj

Skënderbeu advanced to the round of 16.

6 December 2023	Dinamo City	2−0	Oriku	Kompleksi Sportiv FC Dinamo, Arbanë
13:00 CET	Goudiaby 15'; Andoni 52'	Report		Referee: Ervin Kotemelo

Dinamo City advanced to the round of 16.

6 December 2023	Flamurtari	2−0	Burreli	Flamurtari Stadium, Vlorë
13:00 CET	Zogaj 6'; Mrdja 24'	Report		Referee: Olti Çela

Flamurtari advanced to the round of 16.

6 December 2023	Tomori	0−3	Lushnja	Tomori Stadium, Berat
13:00 CET		Report	Ismailaj 9' (pen.); Ayinde 85'; Tabaku 90+1'	Referee: Bekris Dragusha

Lushnja advanced to the round of 16.

6 December 2023	Korabi	2−2 (a.e.t.) (5−4 p)	Besa	Korabi Stadium, Peshkopi
13:00 CET	Boçka 18'; Geci 28'	Report	Deliu 37' (pen.); Balla 72'	Referee: Blerim Ziri

Korabi advanced to the round of 16.

6 December 2023	Apolonia	2−1	Luzi 2008	Loni Papuçiu Stadium, Fier
13:00 CET	Nwatsock 4', 9'	Report	Pjetri 44'	Referee: Ardit Merdanaj

Apolonia advanced to the round of 16.

=== Bracket ===
Round of 16
Kukësi	1
Elbasani	0
Partizani	3
Apolonia	1
Teuta	2
Skënderbeu	0
Tirana	3
Korabi	0
Laçi	1
Dinamo City	0
Egnatia	2
Lushnja	0
Erzeni	2
Bylis	1
Vllaznia	4
Flamurtari	0

Quarter-finals
Kukësi (p)	0	1	1 (5)
Partizani	1	0	1 (3)
Teuta	0	1	1 (5)
Tirana (p)	0	1	1 (6)
Laçi	0	1	1
Egnatia	1	3	4
Erzeni	2	1	3
Vllaznia (a.e.t.)	1	6	7

Semi-finals
Kukësi	2	0	2
Tirana	0	1	1
Egnatia (a.e.t.)	1	1	2
Vllaznia	0	1	1

Final
Kukësi	0
Egnatia	1

== Round of 16 ==
The round of 16 matches were played between the eight winners from the second round and clubs seeded 1–8 in the 2022–23 Kategoria Superiore.

24 January 2024	Partizani	3−1	Apolonia	Arena e Demave, Tirana
13:00 CET	Skuka 56'; Hadroj 65' (pen.); Mensah 87'	Report	Harizaj 55'	Referee: Emanuela Rusta

Partizani advanced to the quarter finals.

24 January 2024	Tirana	3−0	Korabi	Selman Stërmasi Stadium, Tirana
13:00 CET	Lulaj 28'; Latifi 39'; Hoxhallari 47'	Report		Referee: Ermis Çelaj

Tirana advanced to the quarter finals.

24 January 2024	Egnatia	2−0	Lushnja	Egnatia Arena, Rrogozhinë
13:00 CET	Medeiros 45+4'; Gjata 83'	Report		Referee: Ditmir Grimci

Egnatia advanced to the quarter finals.

24 January 2024	Vllaznia	4−0	Flamurtari	Loro Boriçi Stadium, Shkodër
17:00 CET	Balaj 28' (pen.); Mala 30'; Alivoda 41'; Boshnjaku 77' (pen.)	Report		Referee: Laver Alla

Vllaznia advanced to the quarter finals.

24 January 2024	Laçi	1−0	Dinamo City	Laçi Stadium, Laç
13:00 CET	Janku 53' (o.g.)	Report		Referee: Klodian Shahini

Laçi advanced to the quarter finals.

24 January 2024	Teuta	2−0	Skënderbeu	Niko Dovana Stadium, Durrës
17:00 CET	Daci 48'; Arifi 56'	Report		Referee: Erjon Bastari

Teuta advanced to the quarter finals.

24 January 2024	Kukësi	1−0	Elbasani	Redi Maloku Stadium, Fushë-Krujë
13:00 CET	Rashiti 90'	Report		Referee: Kreshnik Cjapi

Kukësi advanced to the quarter finals.

24 January 2024	Erzeni	2−1	Bylis	Elbasan Arena, Elbasan
13:00 CET	Kahrimanović 23' (pen.); Mihana 28'	Report	Kibe 75'	Referee: Erjon Bylykbashi

Erzeni advanced to the quarter finals.

== Quarter-finals ==
The quarter-final matches were played between clubs advancing from the round of 16.

21 February 2024	Erzeni	2−1	Vllaznia	Egnatia Arena, Rrogozhinë
13:30 CET	Asani 63'; Kacbufi 90'	Report	Smajli 87'	Referee: Erjon Bastari

6 March 2024	Vllaznia	6−1 (a.e.t.)	Erzeni	Loro Boriçi Stadium, Shkodër
17:00 CET	Mala 13'; Balaj 45+1', 108'; Gomes 98', 115', 120+1'		Stojanović 63' (o.g.)	Referee: Orlando Kuka

Vllaznia advanced to the semi finals.

20 February 2024	Teuta	0−0	Tirana	Niko Dovana Stadium, Durrës
17:00 CET		Report		Referee: Kreshnik Cjapi

6 March 2024	Tirana	1−1 (a.e.t.) (6−5 p)	Teuta	Elbasan Arena, Elbasan
13:30 CET	Latifi 90+7'		Peposhi 27' (pen.)	Referee: Olsid Ferataj
	Penalties
	Latifi (penalty scored); Mici (penalty scored); Jonuzi (penalty missed); Përgjoni (penalty scored); Lulaj (penalty scored); Nikqi (penalty scored); Haxhiu (penalty scored)		(penalty scored) Kruja; (penalty scored) Gjini; (penalty missed) Kotobelli; (penalty scored) Beqja; (penalty scored) Peposhi; (penalty scored) Arifi; (penalty missed) Jazxhi

Tirana advanced to the semi finals.

21 February 2024	Laçi	0−1	Egnatia	Laçi Stadium, Laç
13:30 CET		Report	Aleksi 90+5' (pen.)	Referee: Dorjan Maletaj

5 March 2024	Egnatia	3−1	Laçi	Egnatia Arena, Rrogozhinë
13:30 CET	Montenegro 19', 49'; Aleksi 38' (pen.)	Report	Myrta 61'	Referee: Eldorjan Hamiti

Egnatia advanced to the semi finals.

20 February 2024	Kukësi	0−1	Partizani	Kukës Arena, Kukës
13:30 CET		Report	Taipi 43'	Referee: Indrit Myrtja

5 March 2024	Partizani	0−1 (a.e.t.) (3−5 p)	Kukësi	Arena e Demave, Tirana
17:00 CET		Report	Hasaj 21'	Referee: Laver Alla
	Penalties
	Atanaskoski (penalty missed); Mikulić (penalty scored); Cara (penalty scored); Murataj (penalty scored)		(penalty scored) Zogos; (penalty scored) Tafa; (penalty scored) Lleshi; (penalty scored) Mingos; (penalty scored) Gbolahan

Kukësi advanced to the semi finals.

== Semi-finals ==
The two-legged semi-finals were played between clubs advancing from the quarter-finals.

3 April 2024	Kukësi	2−0	Tirana	Kukës Arena, Kukës
15:00 CEST	Mingos 19'; Solodovnicov 59'	Report		Referee: Kreshnik Cjapi

24 April 2024	Tirana	1−0	Kukësi	Arena Kombëtare, Tirana
18:00 CEST	Deliu 17'	Report		Referee: Enea Jorgji

Kukësi advanced to the final.

3 April 2024	Egnatia	1−0	Vllaznia	Egnatia Arena, Rrogozhinë
15:00 CEST	Medeiros 30'	Report		Referee: Enea Jorgji

24 April 2024	Vllaznia	1−1 (a.e.t.)	Egnatia	Loro Boriçi Stadium, Shkodër
18:00 CEST	Alivoda 29'	Report	Montenegro 103'	Referee: Juxhin Xhaja

Egnatia advanced to the final.

== Final ==
14 May 2024
19:00 CEST

Kukësi	0−1	Egnatia
	Report	Ndreca 38'

Arena Kombëtare, Tirana
Referee: Juxhin Xhaja

== Top goalscorers ==
Rank	Player	Club	Goals
1	(Albania) Bekim Balaj	Vllaznia	3
1	(Nigeria) Bobby Clement	Elbasani	3
1	(Brazil) Bruno Gomes	Vllaznia	3
1	(Guinea) Mamady Oulare	Bylis	3
1	(Costa Rica) Jurguens Montenegro	Egnatia	3
6	(Albania) Albano Aleksi	Egnatia	2
6	(Cameroon) Calice Nwatsock A Ekoro	Apolonia	2
6	(Brazil) Denisson Silva	Dinamo City	2
6	(Albania) Endri Goçi	Sopoti	2
6	(Albania) Eridon Qardaku	Vora	2
6	(Albania) Esat Mala	Vllaznia	2
6	(Brazil) Fernando Medeiros	Egnatia	2
6	(Albania) Gersi Diamanti	Kastrioti	2
6	(Brazil) Kibe	Bylis	2
6	(Albania) Klodian Nuri	Korabi	2
6	(Albania) Kristian Preknicaj	Lushnja	2
6	(Albania) Liridon Latifi	Tirana	2
6	(Nigeria) Mmesoma Umejiego	Apolonia	2
6	(Albania) Redi Kaçanolli	Apolonia	2
6	(Albania) Serxhio Tafa	Vora	2
6	(Brazil) Yuri Merlim	Skënderbeu	2
