= Alessandro Ahmetaj =

Italian footballer (born 2000)

Personal information
- Date of birth: 2 January 2000 (age 26)
- Place of birth: Novafeltria, Italy
- Height: 1.80 m (5 ft 11 in)
- Position: Midfielder

Team information
- Current team: Egnatia
- Number: 28

Youth career
- –2017: Cesena
- 2017–2020: Sassuolo

Senior career*
Years	Team	Apps	(Gls)
2020–2021	Koper	0	(0)
2021	→ Dekani (loan)	7	(1)
2021–2023	Gorica	55	(3)
2023–	Egnatia	27	(1)

International career^{‡}
2015–2016	Italy U16	14	(1)
2016	Italy U17	7	(0)
- * Club domestic league appearances and goals as of 1 June 2024 ‡ National team caps and goals as of 14 August 2023

Alessandro Ahmetaj (born 2 January 2000) is an Italian footballer who plays as a midfielder for Egnatia.

== Honours ==
Egnatia

- Albanian Cup: 2023–24
