= Buzen, Fukuoka =

Buzen 豊前市
- City
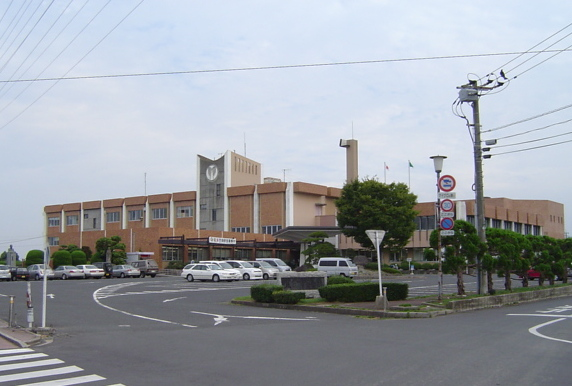
- Buzen City Hall

- Flag Emblem
- Interactive map of Buzen
- Location in Japan
- Coordinates: 33°36′41″N 131°07′49″E
- Country: Japan
- Region: Kyushu
- Prefecture: Fukuoka

Government
  - Mayor: Motohide Goto

Area
  - Total: 111.10 km^{2} (42.90 sq mi)

Population (December 31, 2023)
  - Total: 23,844
  - Density: 214.62/km^{2} (555.86/sq mi)
- Time zone: UTC+09:00 (JST)
- City hall address: 955 Yoshiki, Buzen, Fukuoka Prefecture, Japan 828-0051
- Website: Official website
- Symbols
- Flower: Rhododendron
- Tree: Myrica rubra

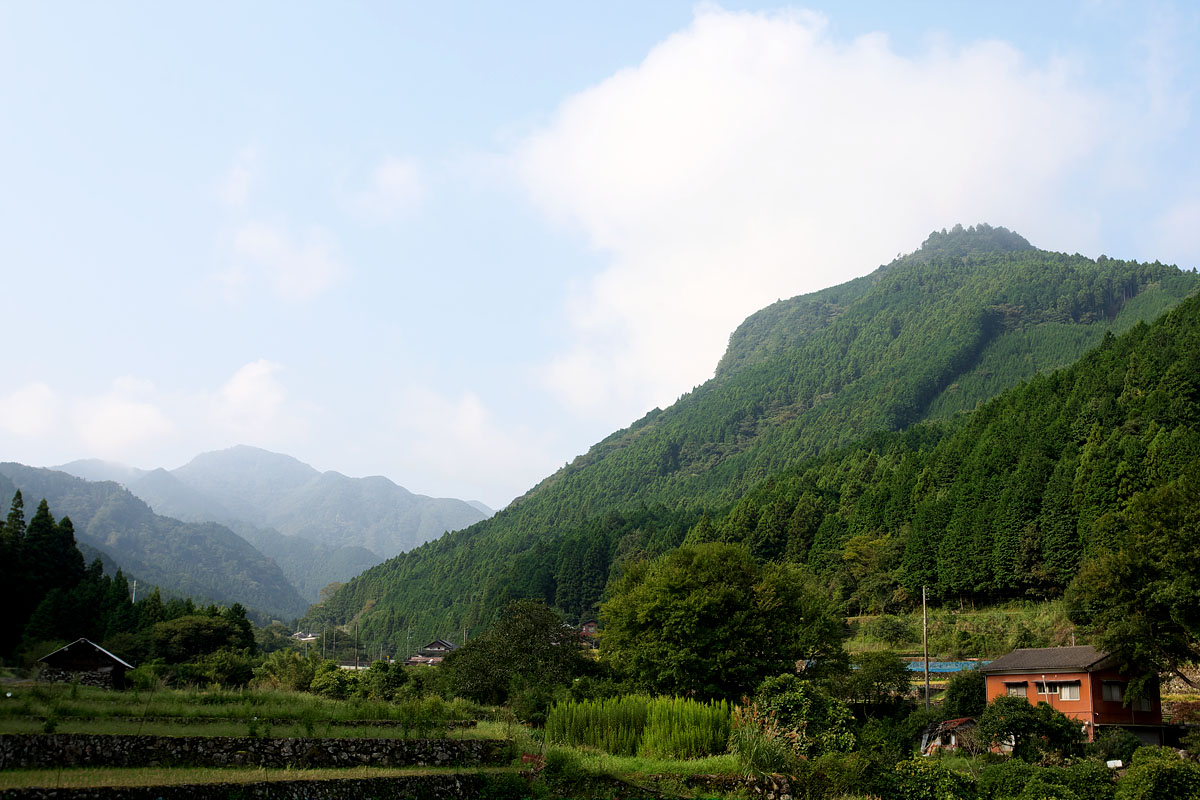
Mt. Kubote and Mt. Inugadake

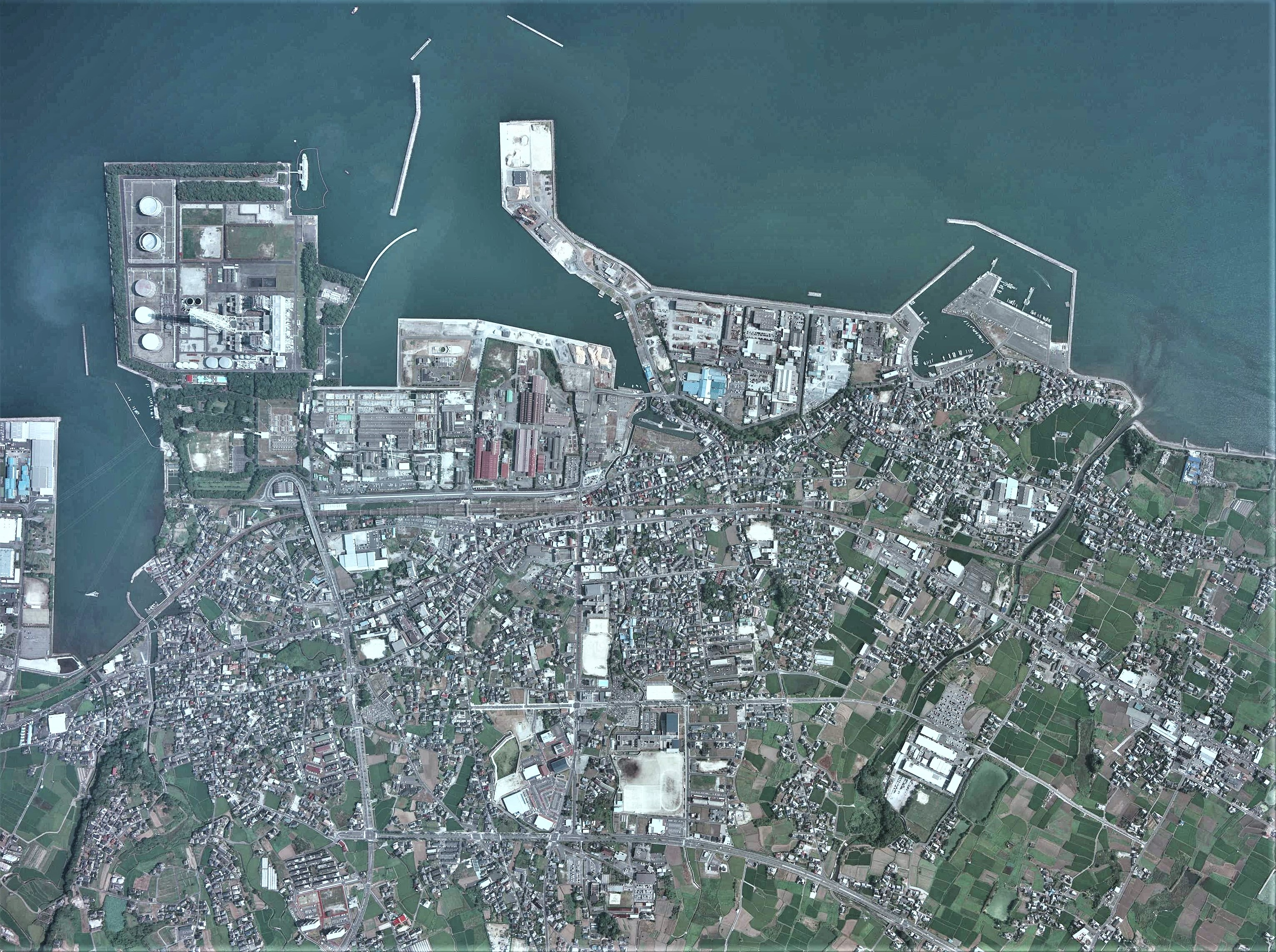
Buzen city center

Buzen (豊前市, Buzen-shi; Japanese pronunciation: [bɯ̈́.(d͡)zè̞ɴ̀, bɯ̈̀.(d͡)zé̞ɰ̃̀.ɕì]) is a city located in Fukuoka Prefecture, Japan. As of 31 December 2023, the city had an estimated population of 23,844 in 11794 households, and a population density of 210 persons per km². The total area of the city is 111.10 km^{2} (42.90 sq mi).

== Geography ==
Buzen is located in the eastern part of Fukuoka Prefecture, approximately halfway between Yukuhashi, Fukuoka and Nakatsu, Ōita. In the southern part of the city is the Chikushi Mountains, which includes mountains such as Mount Kubote and Mount Inugadake. The northern part of the city faces the Gulf of Suo on the Seto Inland Sea. The town is mostly rural and extends nearly 100 km² inland towards more mountainous terrain. The city is roughly 80 kilometers from the prefectural capital at Fukuoka and 43 kilometers from Kitakyushu.

=== Neighboring municipalities ===
Fukuoka Prefecture

- Chikujō
- Kōge
- Yoshitomi

Ōita Prefecture

- Hiji
- Kunisaki
- Nakatsu
- Usa

=== Climate ===
Buzen has a humid subtropical climate (Köppen Cfa) characterized by warm summers and cool winters with light to no snowfall. The average annual temperature in Buzen is 15.3 °C. The average annual rainfall is 1623 mm with September as the wettest month. The temperatures are highest on average in August, at around 26.4 °C, and lowest in January, at around 4.3 °C.

=== Demographics ===
Per Japanese census data, the population of Buzen is as shown below

Historical population
Year	Pop.	±%
1940	28,839	—
1950	37,384	+29.6%
1960	34,818	−6.9%
1970	32,049	−8.0%
1980	31,701	−1.1%
1990	31,089	−1.9%
2000	29,133	−6.3%
2010	27,051	−7.1%
2020	25,189	−6.9%

== History ==
The area of Buzen was part of ancient Buzen Province. During the Edo period it was mostly under control of Nakatsu Domain, with smaller areas as tenryō territory under direct control of the Tokugawa Shogunate. After the Meiji restoration, the towns of Hachiya and Ujima were established on May 1, 1889, with the creation of the modern municipalities system. The two towns merged on April 1, 1935, retaining the name of Hachiya. On April 10, 1955, Hachiya merged with the villages of Kakuda, Yamada, Mikekado, Kurotsuchi, Senzoku, Yokobu, Aikawa, and Iwaya to form the city of Ujima. On April 14, 1955 Ujima was renamed Buzen.

== Government ==
Buzen has a mayor-council form of government with a directly elected mayor and a unicameral city council of 13 members. Buzen, collectively with the municipalities of Chikujō District, Fukuoka contributes one member to the Fukuoka Prefectural Assembly. In terms of national politics, the city is part of the Fukuoka 11th district of the lower house of the Diet of Japan.

== Economy ==
Buzen has a mainly rural economy based on rice cultivation and commercial fishing for shrimp. An industrial zone has been formed around Ujima Port, with Daihatsu Auto Body moving into neighboring Nakatsu City, automobile-related factories have also been built in Buzen. The Kyushu Electric Power Buzen Thermal Power Plant is located in the city

== Education ==
Buzen has ten public elementary schools and four public junior high schools operated by the city government and one public high school operated by the Fukuoka Prefectural Board of Education. The Buzen Chikujo Medical Association Nursing Advanced Vocational School is also located in the city.

== Transportation ==
=== Railways ===
JR Kyushu - Nippō Main Line

- Buzen-Shōe - Unoshima - Mikekado

=== Highways ===
- Higashikyushu Expressway
- National Route 10

== Local attractions ==
- Ootomi Shrine.

== Noted people from Buzen ==
- Shigeno Kibe, early aviator
- Denjirō Ōkōchi, actor
- Ryōichi Yazu, inventor
