= Tsuneyama Station =

Railway station in Tamano, Okayama Prefecture, Japan

Tsuneyama Station 常山駅
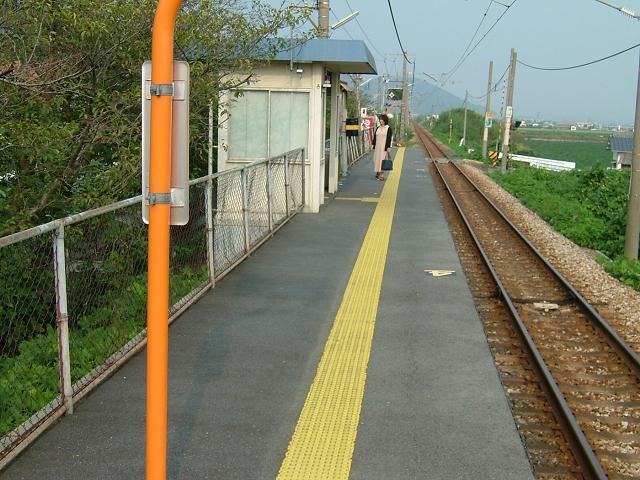
- Tsuneyama station platform, September 2005

General information
- Location: 714-2 Utogi, Tamano-shi, Okayama-ken 706-0133; Japan
- Coordinates: 34°31′53.43″N 133°53′33.9″E
- Owner: West Japan Railway Company
- Operator: West Japan Railway Company
- Line: L Uno Line
- Distance: 24.1 km (15.0 miles) from Okayama
- Platforms: 1 side platform
- Tracks: 1
- Connections: Bus stop

Other information
- Status: Unstaffed
- Station code: JR-L12
- Website: Official website

History
- Opened: January 1, 1939
- Closed: 1 November 1940 to 15 November 1950

Passengers
- FY2019: 435 daily
Location
- Location within Okayama Prefecture Location within Japan

Tsuneyama Station (常山駅, Tsuneyama-eki) is a passenger railway station located in the city of Tamano, Okayama Prefecture, Japan, operated by the West Japan Railway Company (JR West).

== Lines ==
Tsuneyama Station is served by the JR Uno Line, and is located 24.1 kilometers from the terminus of the line at Okayama and 9.5 kilometers from Chayamachi.

== Station layout ==
The station consists of one ground-level side platform serving a single bi-directional track. There is no station building and the station is unattended.

== Adjacent stations ==
«	Service	»
JR West Uno Line
Hazakawa	Local	Hachihama

== History ==
Tsuneyama Station was opened on 1 January 1939. The station was closed from 1 November 1940 to 15 November 1950. With the privatization of Japanese National Railways (JNR) on 1 April 1987, the station came under the control of JR West.

== Passenger statistics ==
In fiscal 2019, the station was used by an average of 435 passengers daily

== Surrounding area ==
- Tamano Driving School
- Tsuneyama Castle ruins
- Japan National Route 30

== See also ==
- List of railway stations in Japan
