= Unoshima Station =

Railway station in Buzen, Fukuoka Prefecture, Japan

Unoshima Station 宇島駅
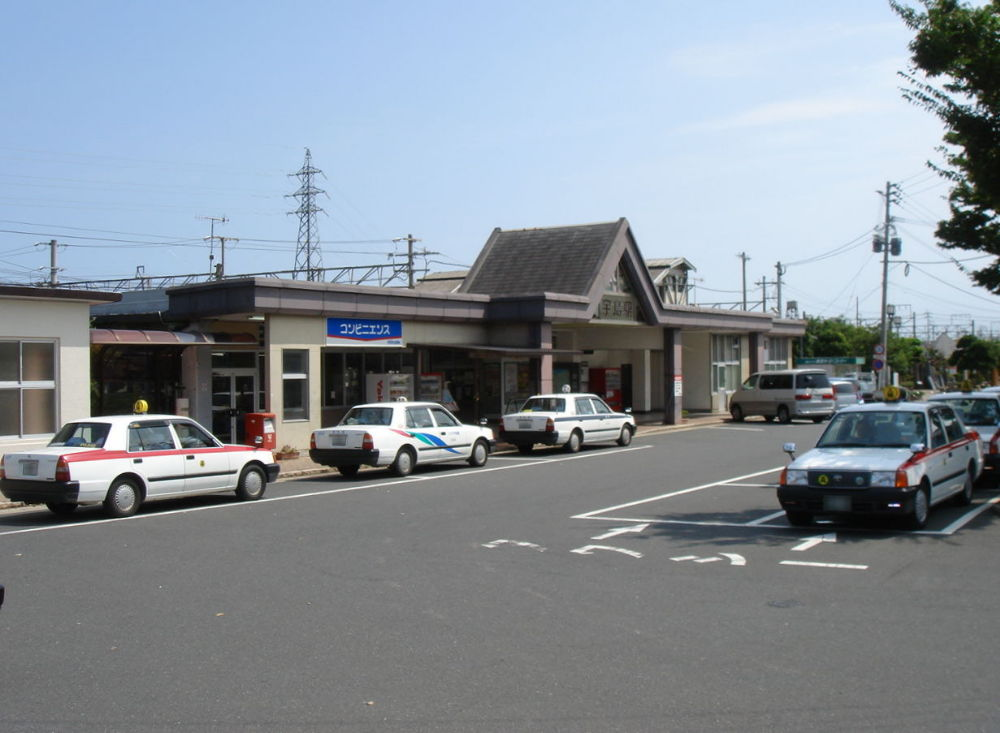
- Unoshima Station in August 2006

General information
- Location: Hachiya, Buzen-shi, Fukuoka-ken 828-0021; Japan
- Coordinates: 33°37′16″N 131°07′36″E
- Operator: JR Kyushu
- Line: ■ Nippō Main Line
- Distance: 45.2 km from Kokura
- Platforms: 1 side + island platform
- Tracks: 3

Other information
- Status: Unstaffed
- Website: Official website

History
- Opened: 25 September 1897

Passengers
- FY2020: 1382 daily

Services
Preceding station	JR Kyushu	Following station
Mikekado towards Kagoshima	Nippō Main Line	Buzen-Shōe towards Kokura
Location
- Location within Fukuoka Prefecture Location within Japan

Unoshima Station (宇島駅, Unoshima-eki) s a passenger railway station located in the city of Buzen, Fukuoka Prefecture, Japan. It is operated by JR Kyushu.

== Lines ==
The station is served by the Nippō Main Line and is located 45.2 km from the starting point of the line at Kokura.

== Layout ==
The station consists of one side platform and island platform serving three tracks connected to the station building by a footbridge. The station is unattended.

=== Platforms ===
1	■ ■ Nippō Main Line	for Kokura and Hakata
2	■ ■ Nippō Main Line	for bi-directional traffic
3	■ ■ Nippō Main Line	for Nakatsu and Ōita

== History ==
The station was opened on September 25, 1897 with the opening of the private Hōshū Railway between Yukuhashi and Yanagigaura. The Hōshū railway was acquired by the Kyushu Railway on September 3, 1903. The Kyushu Railway was nationalised on 1 July 1907. Japanese Government Railways (JGR), designated the track as the Hōshū Main Line on 12 October 1909 and expanded it southwards in phases. On 15 December 1923, the Hōshū Main Line was renamed the Nippō Main Line. With the privatization of Japanese National Railways (JNR), the successor of JGR, on 1 April 1987, the station came under the control of JR Kyushu.

== Passenger statistics ==
In fiscal 2020, there was a daily average of 1382 boarding passengers at this station.

== Surrounding area ==
- Buzen City Hall
- Fukuoka Prefectural Aotoyo High School

== See also ==
- List of railway stations in Japan
