= Tamano =

Tamano 玉野市
- City
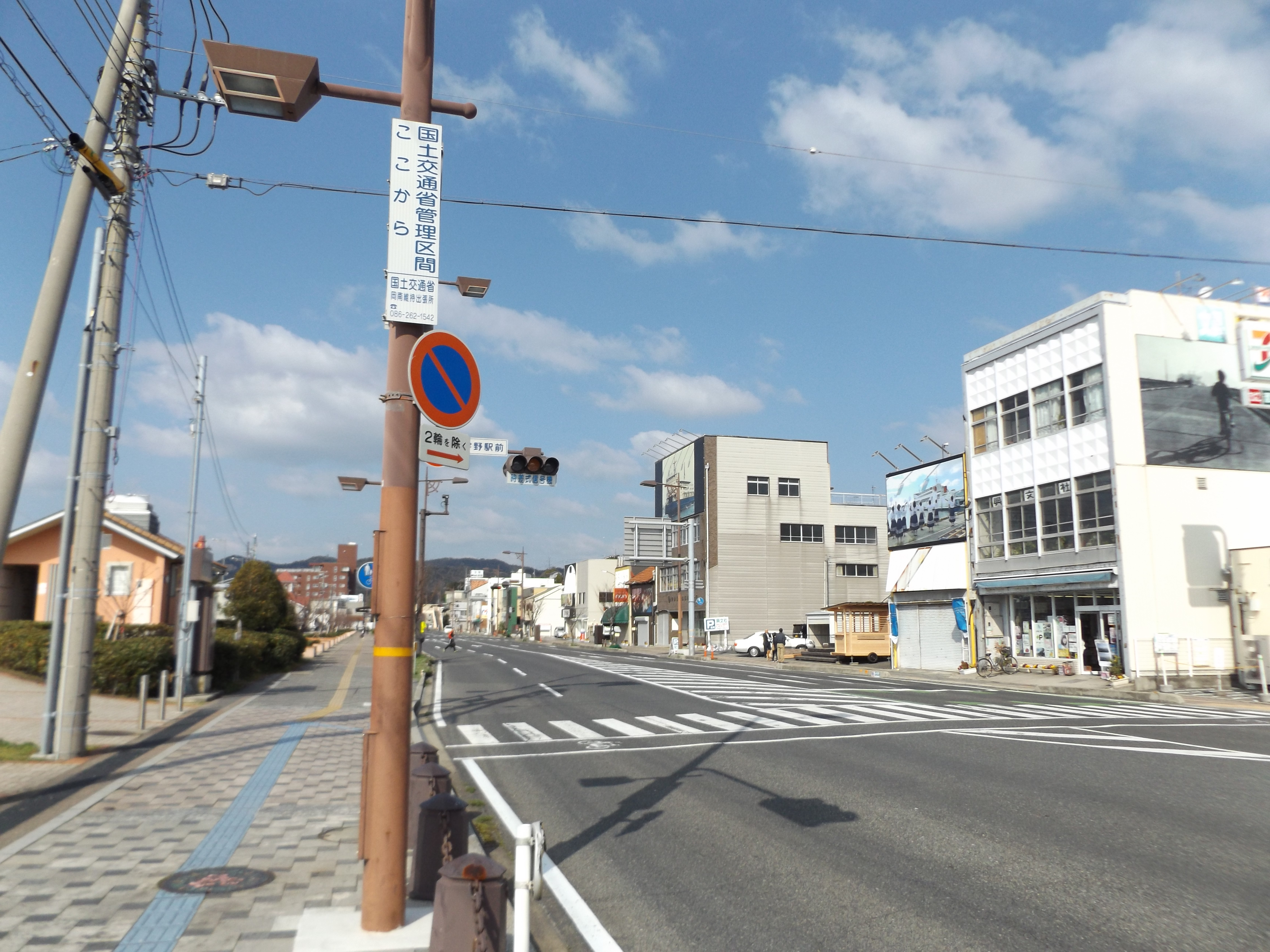
- Crossing in Tamano City

- Flag Seal
- Location of Tamano in Okayama Prefecture

- Location in Japan
- Coordinates: 34°29′19″N 133°56′55″E
- Country: Japan
- Region: Chūgoku (San'yō)
- Prefecture: Okayama

Government
  - Mayor: Susumu Kuroda (since October 2005)

Area
  - Total: 103.58 km^{2} (39.99 sq mi)

Population (October 31, 2022)
  - Total: 55,889
  - Density: 539.57/km^{2} (1,397.5/sq mi)
- Time zone: UTC+09:00 (JST)
- City hall address: 1-27-1 Uno, Tamano-shi, Okayama-ken 706-8510
- Climate: Cfa
- Website: Official website
- Symbols
- Fish: "Sebastes inermis" (Mebaru in Japanese)
- Flower: Azalea
- Tree: Quercus

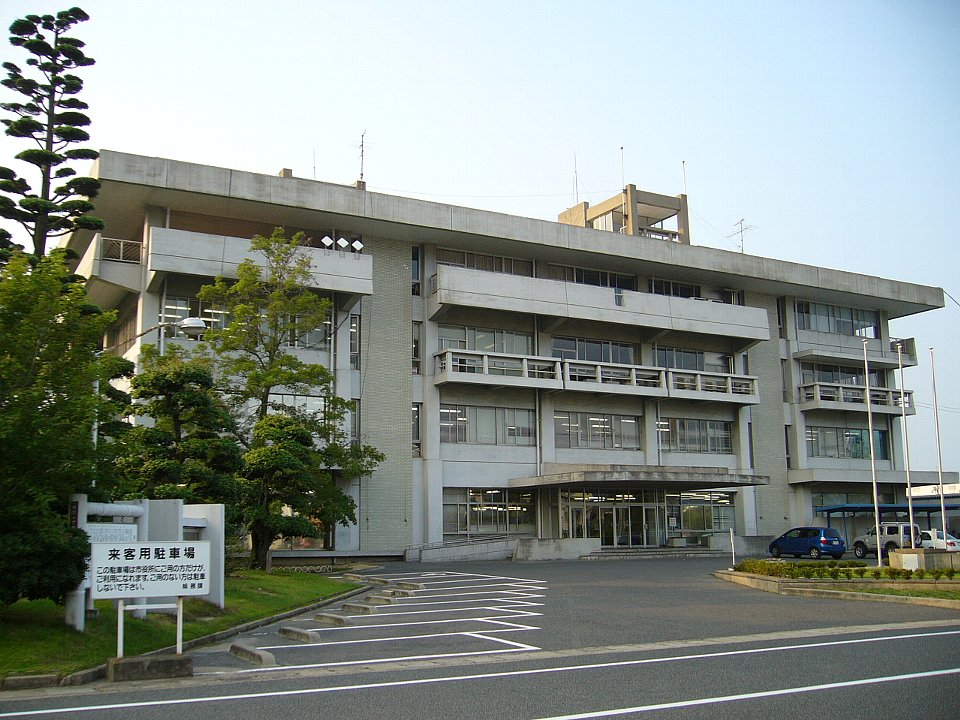
Tamano City Hall

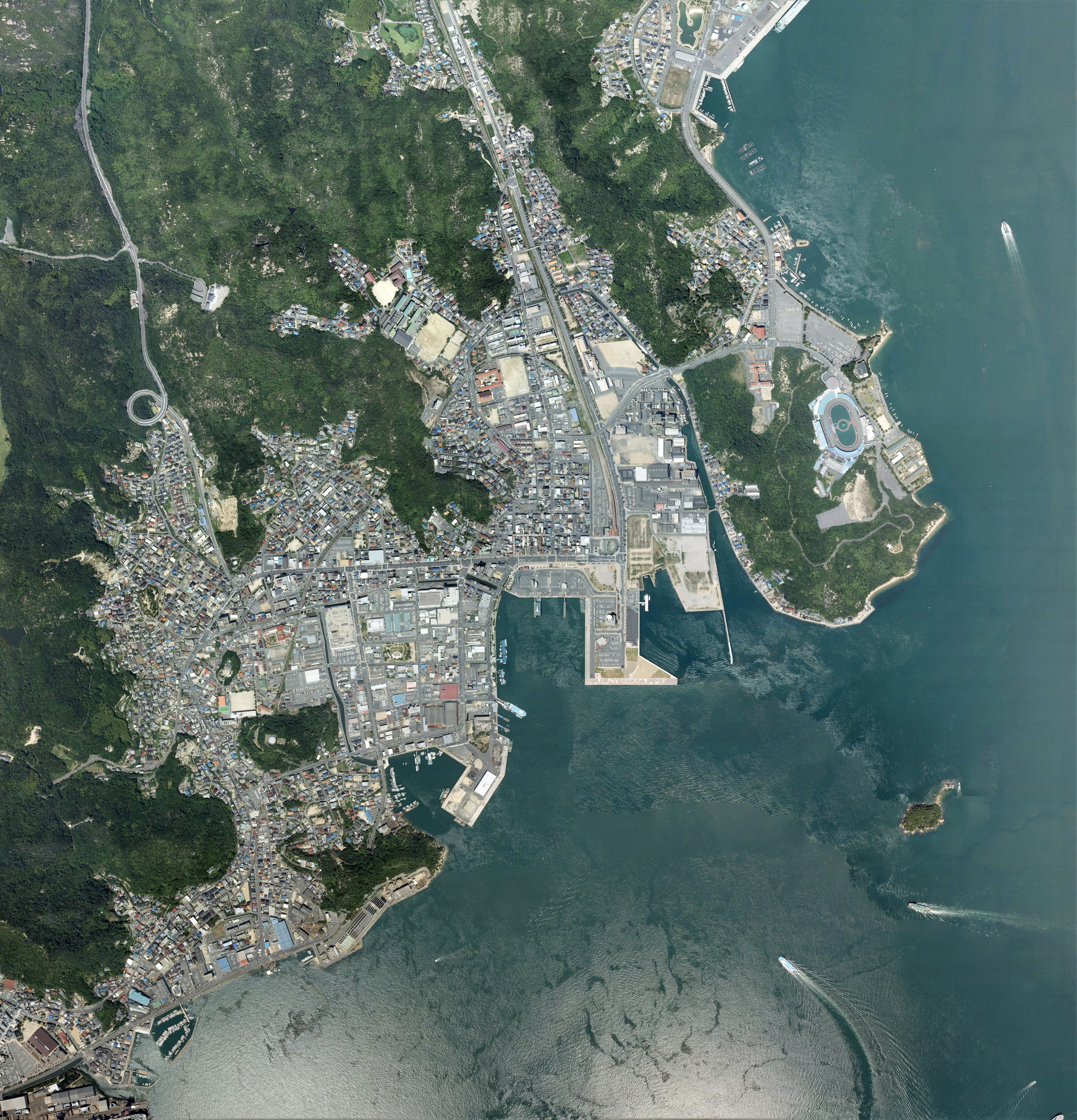
Aerial view of Tamano city center

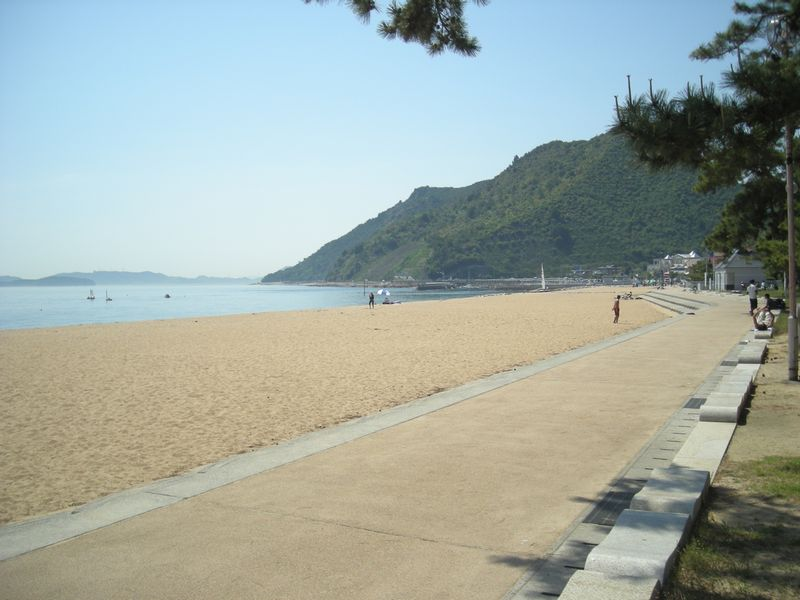
Shibukawa beach in Tamano

Tamano (玉野市, Tamano-shi) is a city located in southern Okayama Prefecture, Japan. As of 31 October 2022, the city had an estimated population of 55,889 in 27087 households, and a population density of 540 persons per km^{2} . Its total area is 103.58 square kilometres (39.99 sq mi)

== Geography ==
Tamano is located in southern Okayama Prefecture. It faces the Seto Inland Sea to the south, and parts of the city are within the borders of the Setonaikai National Park.

=== Adjoining municipalities ===
Okayama Prefecture

- Kurashiki
- Okayama

=== Climate ===
Tamano has a humid subtropical climate (Köppen climate classification Cfa). The average annual temperature in Tamano is 16.1 °C (61.0 °F). The average annual rainfall is 1,038.5 mm (40.89 in) with July as the wettest month. The temperatures are highest on average in August, at around 28.1 °C (82.6 °F), and lowest in January, at around 5.5 °C (41.9 °F). The highest temperature ever recorded in Tamano was 38.2 °C (100.8 °F) on 19 August 1995; the coldest temperature ever recorded was −6.4 °C (20.5 °F) on 26 February 1981.

Climate data for Tamano (1991−2020 normals, extremes 1976−present)
Month	Jan	Feb	Mar	Apr	May	Jun	Jul	Aug	Sep	Oct	Nov	Dec	Year
Record high °C (°F)	17.2 (63.0)	19.8 (67.6)	24.4 (75.9)	29.0 (84.2)	32.3 (90.1)	36.1 (97.0)	37.1 (98.8)	38.2 (100.8)	37.1 (98.8)	31.5 (88.7)	26.0 (78.8)	20.9 (69.6)	38.2 (100.8)
Mean daily maximum °C (°F)	9.2 (48.6)	9.7 (49.5)	13.0 (55.4)	18.1 (64.6)	22.9 (73.2)	26.0 (78.8)	30.3 (86.5)	32.1 (89.8)	28.6 (83.5)	23.1 (73.6)	17.2 (63.0)	11.7 (53.1)	20.2 (68.3)
Daily mean °C (°F)	5.5 (41.9)	5.8 (42.4)	8.8 (47.8)	13.7 (56.7)	18.5 (65.3)	22.2 (72.0)	26.3 (79.3)	28.1 (82.6)	24.7 (76.5)	19.0 (66.2)	13.1 (55.6)	7.9 (46.2)	16.1 (61.0)
Mean daily minimum °C (°F)	2.0 (35.6)	2.0 (35.6)	4.6 (40.3)	9.5 (49.1)	14.6 (58.3)	19.2 (66.6)	23.5 (74.3)	25.2 (77.4)	21.4 (70.5)	15.3 (59.5)	9.2 (48.6)	4.3 (39.7)	12.6 (54.6)
Record low °C (°F)	−4.0 (24.8)	−6.4 (20.5)	−5.1 (22.8)	0.1 (32.2)	5.7 (42.3)	10.4 (50.7)	17.5 (63.5)	18.3 (64.9)	11.6 (52.9)	5.8 (42.4)	1.7 (35.1)	−3.5 (25.7)	−6.4 (20.5)
Average precipitation mm (inches)	35.5 (1.40)	42.9 (1.69)	77.9 (3.07)	78.7 (3.10)	103.1 (4.06)	146.2 (5.76)	152.5 (6.00)	78.3 (3.08)	137.4 (5.41)	97.4 (3.83)	48.4 (1.91)	40.3 (1.59)	1,038.5 (40.89)
Average precipitation days (≥ 1.0 mm)	5.4	6.5	9.1	9.0	8.8	10.7	9.1	5.6	8.5	7.3	5.9	5.8	91.7
Mean monthly sunshine hours	158.5	152.4	182.3	202.1	212.7	166.2	203.6	237.8	171.1	179.1	161.6	159.8	2,187.1
Source: Japan Meteorological Agency

=== Demographics ===
Per Japanese census data, the population of Tamano in 2020 is 56,531 people. Tamano has been conducting censuses since 1920.

Historical population

Year	Pop.	±%
1920	35,355	—
1925	32,647	−7.7%
1930	36,382	+11.4%
1935	40,717	+11.9%
1940	51,879	+27.4%
1945	62,237	+20.0%
1950	65,625	+5.4%
1955	68,076	+3.7%
1960	70,933	+4.2%
1965	71,419	+0.7%
1970	73,478	+2.9%

Year	Pop.	±%
1975	78,516	+6.9%
1980	77,803	−0.9%
1985	76,954	−1.1%
1990	73,238	−4.8%
1995	71,330	−2.6%
2000	69,567	−2.5%
2005	67,047	−3.6%
2010	64,553	−3.7%
2015	60,736	−5.9%
2020	56,531	−6.9%

Tamano population statistics

== History ==
The Tamano area is part of ancient Bizen Province. During the Edo Period, it was part of the holdings of Okayama Domain. Following the Meiji restoration, the area was organized into villages within Kojima District, Okayama with the creation of the modern municipalities system on April 1, 1889. The city of Tamano was officially founded on August 3, 1940 by the merger of the towns of Uno and Hibi.

== Government ==
Tamano has a mayor-council form of government with a directly elected mayor and a unicameral city council of 19 members. Tamano contributes two members to the Okayama Prefectural Assembly. In terms of national politics, the city is part of the Okayama 2nd district of the lower house of the Diet of Japan.

== Economy ==
Tamano has a mixed economy of heavy industry, commercial fishing and agriculture. Shipbuilding and metal refining are major industries, with one of the largest shipbuilding yards in Japan, operated by Mitsui Engineering & Shipbuilding, is located in Tamano. Other industries include textiles, chemicals, oil refining and salt production.

== Education ==
Tamano has 14 public elementary schools, seven public junior high schools and two public high schools operated by the city government, and two public high schools operated by the Okayama prefectural Board of Education.

== Transportation ==
The JR Uno Line connects it to Okayama. Before the Great Seto Bridge was opened, there was a train ferry between Uno Port in Tamano and Takamatsu on Shikoku. Then, Tamano was the major entrance to Shikoku. Today there still exist many ferry lines between Uno port and Takamatsu, and also the islands of Shōdoshima and Naoshima.

=== Railway ===
JR West (JR West) - Uno Line

- Tsuneyama - Hachihama - Bizen-Tai - Uno

=== Highways ===
- National Route 30
- National Route 430

== Sister cities ==
- Tongyeong, South Gyeongsang, Republic of Korea since August 3, 1981
- Jiujiang, Jiangxi , China, friendship city since 1996
- Gloucester, Massachusetts, United States, since July 23, 2004

== Notable people from Tamano ==
- Yukari Ichijo, manga artist
- Hisaichi Ishii, manga artist
- Ukita Kōkichi, aviation pioneer
- Taiyo Sugiura, actor
- Tetsuo Takashima, author
- Katsuya Terada, artist
- Hiroshi Yagi, baseball player
