= Ilir Dabjani =

Albanian footballer

Personal information
- Full name: Ilir Dabjani
- Date of birth: 20 January 2001 (age 25)
- Place of birth: Kavajë, Albania
- Position: Goalkeeper

Team information
- Current team: Egnatia
- Number: 12

Youth career
- 2013–2019: Besa Kavajë

Senior career*
Years	Team	Apps	(Gls)
2018–2023	Besa Kavajë	72	(0)
2023–2025	Egnatia	22	(0)
2023–2025	→ Laçi (loan)	4	(0)
2025–	Vushtrria	0	(0)

International career
2019	Albania U19	3	(0)
- * Club domestic league appearances and goals as of 18 July 2025

Ilir Dabjani (born 20 January 2001) is an Albanian professional footballer who plays as a goalkeeper for Albanian club Egnatia.

== Honours ==
Egnatia

- Albanian Superliga :2023-24, 2024-25
- Albanian Cup: 2023–24
