= Buzen-Shōe Station =

Railway station in Buzen, Fukuoka Prefecture, Japan

Buzen-Shōe Station 豊前松江駅
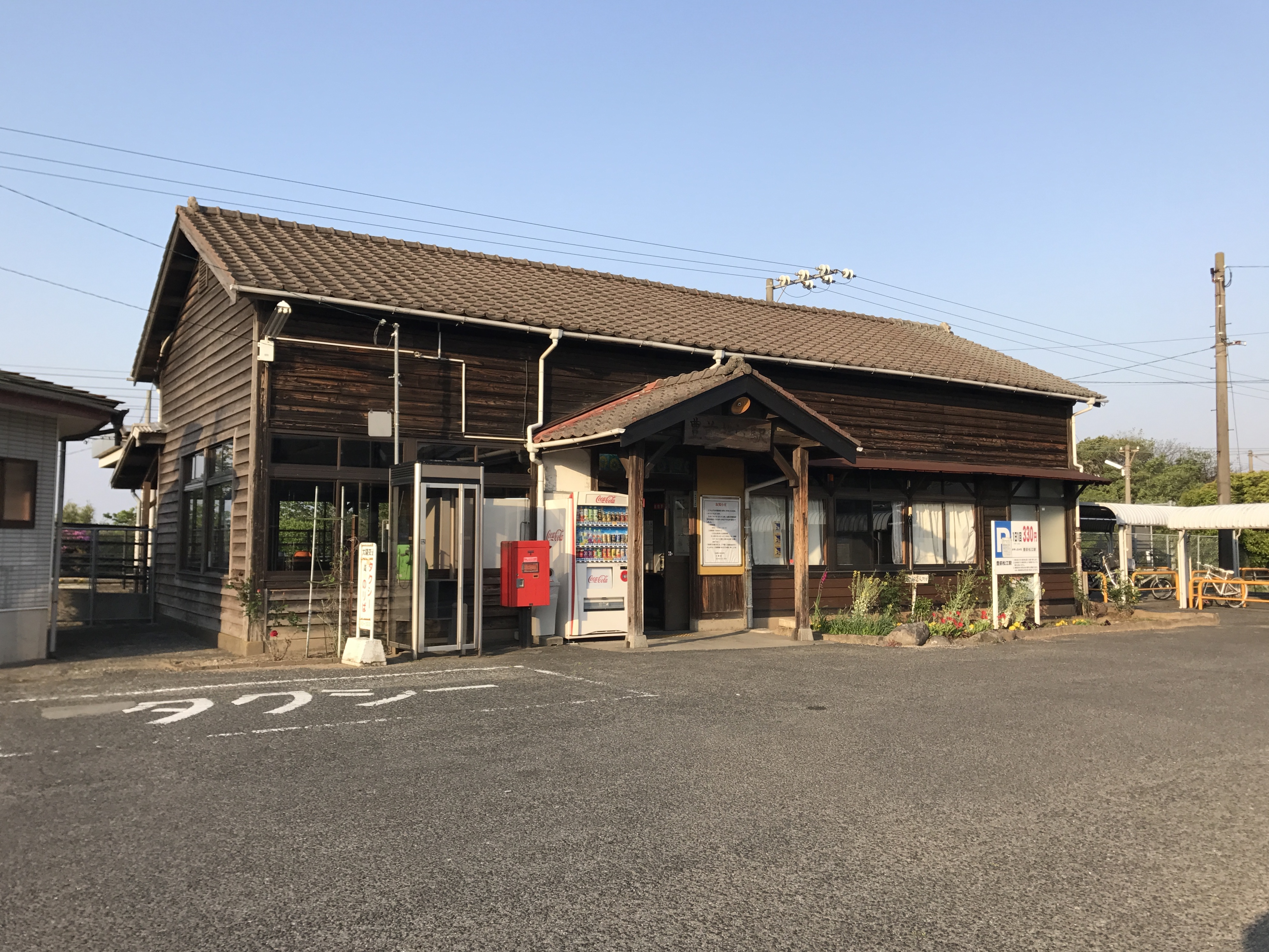
- Buzen-Shōe Station building in April 2017

General information
- Location: Shoe, Buzen-shi, Fukuoka-ken 828-0002; Japan
- Coordinates: 33°37′21″N 131°05′42″E
- Operator: JR Kyushu
- Line: ■ Nippō Main Line
- Distance: 41.8 km from Kokura
- Platforms: 2 side platforms
- Tracks: 2

Other information
- Status: Unstaffed
- Website: Official website

History
- Opened: 25 September 1897
- Former names: Shōe (to 1945)

Services
| Preceding station | JR Kyushu | Following station |
|---|---|---|
| Unoshima towards Kagoshima | Nippō Main Line | Shiida towards Kokura |
Location
- Location within Fukuoka Prefecture Location within Japan

Buzen-Shōe Station (豊前松江駅, Buzen-Shōe-eki) or Buzen-Matsue station is a passenger railway station located in the city of Buzen, Fukuoka Prefecture, Japan. It is operated by JR Kyushu.

== Lines ==
The station is served by the Nippō Main Line and is located 41.8 km from the starting point of the line at Kokura.

== Layout ==
The station consists of two parallel side platforms serving two tracks connected to the station building by a footbridge. The station is unattended.

=== Platforms ===
| 1 | ■ ■ Nippō Main Line | for Yukuhashi and Kokura |
| 2 | ■ ■ Nippō Main Line | for Unoshima and Nakatsu |

== History ==
The station was opened as Shōe Station or Matsue station (豊前松江駅, Shōe-eki) on September 25, 1897 with the opening of the private Hōshū Railway between Yukuhashi and Yanagigaura. The Hōshū railway was acquired by the Kyushu Railway on September 3, 1903. The Kyushu Railway was nationalised on 1 July 1907. Japanese Government Railways (JGR), designated the track as the Hōshū Main Line on 12 October 1909 and expanded it southwards in phases. On 15 December 1923, the Hōshū Main Line was renamed the Nippō Main Line. The station was renamed to its present name on May 1, 1945 to avoid confusion with Matsue on the San'in Main Line, which used the same kanji. With the privatization of Japanese National Railways (JNR), the successor of JGR, on 1 April 1987, the station came under the control of JR Kyushu.

== Surrounding area ==
- Japan National Route 10
- Buzen City Kakuda Elementary School
- Buzen City Kakuda Junior High School

== See also ==
- List of railway stations in Japan
