= Ryōichi Yazu =

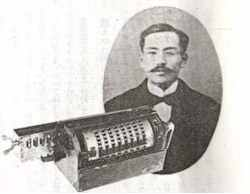
Ryōichi Yazu and his Patent Yazu Arithmometer.

Ryōichi Yazu (矢頭 良一, Yazu Ryōichi, 30 June 1878 – 16 October 1908) was a Japanese inventor. He is best known for his invention of Japan's first mechanical calculator.

== Birth and education ==
Ryōichi Yazu was born in Buzen, Fukuoka as the son of a village mayor. He attended primary and middle school in his home village of Iwaya and the city of Buzen. At the age of 16 he left middle school and travelled to Osaka to pursue his interest in flight, studying mathematics and engineering at a private school in Osaka.

At the age of 22 he returned to Buzen and began work on a thesis on the mechanics of flight. Two years later he brought the thesis and a model of his calculator on a visit to the novelist and army physician Mori Ōgai. Impressed, Ōgai wrote recommendations that led to a special research position at the Tokyo Imperial College of Engineering, where he worked on the design of a propeller-driven airplane.

== Mechanical calculator ==
In March 1902 Yazu applied for a patent on his mechanical calculator, called the Yazu Arithmometer. It was a gear type calculator with a single cylinder and 22 gears, capable of arithmetic calculations up to 16 digits, with automatic carry and end of calculation functions. A special feature was that it accepted input in the biquinary number system familiar to users of the soroban (Japanese abacus).

The patent was granted in 1903, and a shop was established to manufacture it. About 200 units were produced and sold, mainly to government agencies, including the Ministry of War, the Home Ministry, the statistics bureau, and agricultural experiment stations, and also to companies such as Nippon Railway. The calculator was expensive, costing 250 yen, more than ten times the monthly salary of a newspaper reporter or lower-level government official. Yazu invested the profits in a factory to build his airplane. But that project was abandoned after his untimely death from pleurisy at the age of 31.

One of the calculators is preserved in the Kitakyūshū City Museum of Literature. In 2008 the Yazu Arithmometer was listed as item No. 30 in the Mechanical Engineering Heritage (Japan).

== See also ==
- Earliest calculators
- Chūhachi Ninomiya
