= 2019 Albanian Cup final =

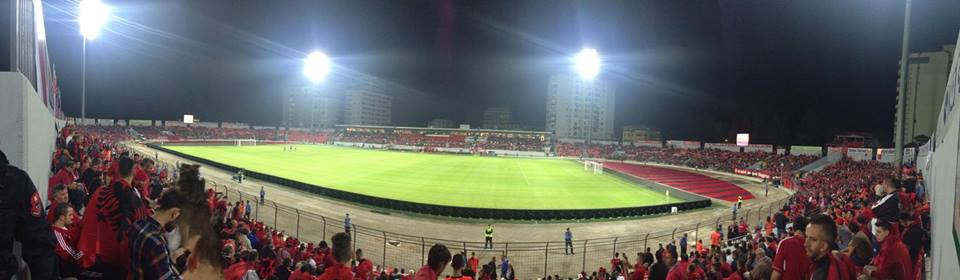
- The Elbasan Arena in Elbasan will hold the final
- Event: 2018–19 Albanian Cup
Kukësi	Tirana
2	1
- Date: 2 June 2019
- Venue: Elbasan Arena, Elbasan
- Referee: Enea Jorgji
- Attendance: 1,500

The 2019 Albanian Cup final was a football match played on 2 June 2019 to decide the winner of the 2018–19 Albanian Cup, the 67th edition of Albania's primary football cup.

The match was played between Kukësi and Tirana at the Elbasan Arena in Elbasan.

Kukësi won the match 2-1, their second time winning the Albanian Cup.

== Match ==
=== Details ===
2 June 2019
19:00

Kukësi	2–1	Tirana
Shkurtaj 4'; Reginaldo 78'		Ngoo 66'

Elbasan Arena, Elbasan
Attendance: 1,500
Referee: Enea Jorgji
