= Jurguens Montenegro =

Costa Rican football player (born 2000)

Personal information
- Full name: Jurguens Josafat Montenegro Vallejo
- Date of birth: 13 December 2000 (age 25)
- Place of birth: Puntarenas, Costa Rica
- Height: 1.77 m (5 ft 10 in)
- Position: Forward

Team information
- Current team: Herediano
- Number: 77

Youth career
- 2016–2018: Alajuelense

Senior career*
Years	Team	Apps	(Gls)
2017–2023	Alajuelense	80	(17)
2019	→ Cartaginés (loan)	17	(3)
2020	→ Jicaral (loan)	19	(8)
2021	→ Bolívar (loan)	11	(1)
2022–2023	→ Puntarenas (loan)	28	(6)
2023	→ Pérez Zeledón (loan)	21	(5)
2024	Egnatia	19	(5)
2024–2025	Municipal Liberia	25	(7)
2025–	Herediano	29	(2)

International career^{‡}
2018	Costa Rica U20	6	(1)
2020–	Costa Rica U23	3	(0)
2021–	Costa Rica	5	(0)
- * Club domestic league appearances and goals as of 25 June 2026 ‡ National team caps and goals as of 18:50, 5 December 2021 (UTC)

Jurguens Josafat Montenegro Vallejo (born 13 December 2000) is a Costa Rican professional footballer who plays as a forward for Herediano.

== Club career ==
=== LD Alajuelense ===
Growing up in Fray Casiano, Chacarita, Puntarenas, Montenegro played a lot matches on the beach along the central Pacific coast of Costa Rica. Montenegro left his home when he was 16 years old to move to the province of Alajuela to play for the academy teams of the LD Alajuelense in mid 2016, after the club discovered him. As revealed by Montenegro, he sometimes had to borrow money to go to train with Alajuelense and also went out several times with his stepfather to fish. He started on the clubs U17 team and in just 12 games, scored 16 goals.

On 5 November 2017, 17-year old Montenegro got his professional debut for Alajuelense against A.D. Municipal Liberia in the Liga FPD, when he came on as a substitute for Barlon Sequeira in the 77th minute. He played a total of 74 minutes, spread over four games, in that season. In the 2018–19 season, he played 557 minutes in 14 games and scored two goals.

==== Loan spells ====
To continue his development and add some more minutes, Montenegro was loaned out to C.S. Cartaginés on 17 July 2020 for six months. Montenegro played 17 games and scored three goals for the club.

Returning to the club at the end of 2019, he was loaned out once again, this time to A.D.R. Jicaral until June 2020. Here, he played 19 games, 15 of them as a starter and 4 as a substitute, and scored eight goals.

==== Return to Alajuelense ====
He returned to Alajuelense in the summer 2020 Although starting the pre-season with an injury, Montenegro played in the first ten games for Alajuelense. In October 2020, Montenegro's agent revealed, that there was interest in Montenegro from international clubs.

On 27 July 2021 it was confirmed, that Montenegro had joined Bolivian club Club Bolívar on a one-year loan with an option to buy. However, Bolívar didn't trigger the option, and Montenegro returned to Alajuelense at the end of 2021, after 1 goal in 11 games for the Bolivian club.

==== New loan spell ====
In July 2022, Montenegro once again departed on loan, this time to Puntarenas for one year - until June 2023. After returning, he joined Pérez Zeledón on a new loan deal, this time until the end of 2023.

=== Egnatia ===
On 11 January 2024, Montenegro joined Albanian Kategoria Superiore side Egnatia.

=== Municipal Liberia ===
In August 2024, Montenegro returned to Costa Rica, signing for Municipal Liberia.

=== Herediano ===
On 31 May 2025, Herediano confirmed that they had signed Montenegro.

== International career ==
On 26 October 2018, Montenegro was called up for the Costa Rican U20 national team to participate in the 2018 CONCACAF U-20 Championship that started on 1 November in the United States. Montenegro scored his first goal in the first game against the Bermuda U-20 on 1 November 2018, in Costa Rica's 5–0 victory. He played a total of six games in the tournament.

Montenegro also played games for Costa Rica U23 during 2020. In August 2020, he was also called up for the training of the Costa Rican A-national team.

He made his debut for Costa Rica national football team on 3 June 2021 in a CONCACAF Nations League semi-final against Mexico. He substituted Randall Leal in the 85th minute.

== Honours ==
Alajuelense

- Liga FPD: Apertura 2020
- CONCACAF League: 2020

Egnatia

- Albanian Cup: 2023–24

== Personal life ==
=== Family ===
In the summer 2020, Montenegro revealed that he came from a family with financial difficulties and that his father was an alcoholic. He also said, that when he sometimes goes to visit his hometown Fray Casiano, Chacarita, Puntarenas, he finds his father on the streets.
