= Chūhachi Ninomiya =

Japanese pioneer of aviation

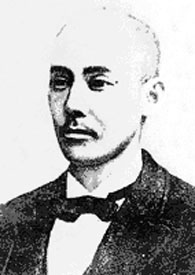
Chūhachi Ninomiya

Chūhachi Ninomiya (二宮 忠八, Ninomiya Chūhachi; 20 June 1866 – 8 April 1936) was a Japanese aviation pioneer. He is remembered for his unique aircraft designs - the "Karasu-gata mokei hikouki" ("Crow-type model aircraft", 1891) and the "Tamamushi-gata hikouki" ("Jewel beetle type flyer", 1893). He designed a flying machine with three engines earlier than the Wright brothers, which contributed to Japan's accumulation of capabilities to design and manufacture aircraft by the 1930s.

== Early life ==
Chūhachi was born in Yawatahama-ura, Uwa District, Iyo Province (now Yawatahama, Ehime). At the age of 12, his father, a local merchant, died, forcing him to take up a job to make a living. While working at a printing office, drug store, and elsewhere, he taught himself physics and chemistry. He also became an expert at making kites and the sale of his original models earned him money for books.

== Idea for flying ==
In 1887 Chūhachi was conscripted into the Imperial Japanese Army. In November 1889, during maneuvers, he saw crows gliding and noticed that they did not flap. He developed the idea of fixed wing aircraft.

Chūhachi made his first model, "Karasu-gata mokei hikouki"(烏型模型飛行器, "Crow-type model aircraft"). This was also the first model aircraft in Japan. It was a monoplane, with a wingspan of 45 centimetres. The wing was at a dihedral angle. The four-blade pusher propeller, inspired from a bamboo-copter, was driven by a rubber band. The model was equipped with a horizontal stabilizer at its tail, and a vertical stabilizer at its nose. It had three wheels as landing gear. On 29 April 1891 the model ran 3 metres after which it took off and flew 10 metres. The next day, it flew about 36 metres with a hand-launch.

His second model was "Tamamushi-gata hikouki"(玉虫型飛行器, "Jewel beetle type flyer"), a tailless biplane. The lower wing, which was smaller than the upper, was a movable control surface. The model was also equipped with a four-blade pusher propeller. Chūhachi failed to attract the interest of the Army. During the period he only made scale models (wingspan: 2 metres) in October 1893.

Chūhachi served in the First Sino-Japanese War as a combat medic. After the war, he retired from the army and worked at a pharmaceutical company. He decided to develop a flying machine on his own. Until he became the branch manager in 1906, development stagnated for lack of money. During this period, the Wright brothers succeeded with a manned flight. But Chūhachi did not hear the news. He built the whole hull of the "Tamamushi model" and planned to equip it with a 12 hp gasoline engine. However, in 1907 or 1908, he learned of the success of manned flights of heavier-than-air aircraft in Europe and America. He despaired and stopped development.

Some experts insist that the "Tamamushi model" would not have flown even if it were completed, since it was just too heavy. In April 1991 a replica of the "Tamamushi model", with alterations to improve stability, successfully flew a distance of 50 meters (136 feet).

== Later life ==
He concentrated on his work at the pharmaceutical company.

In 1915 he founded Hiko Shrine dedicated to people who have died in aviation accidents.

In 1921, lieutenant general Yoshinori Shirakawa surveyed Chūhachi's plan and recognized the value. In 1922, the Army commended him. Minister Adachi Kenzo (in 1925), and Prince Kuni Kuniyoshi (in 1926) also commended him. In 1927, he was awarded order.

In his last years, he became a kannushi (priest of shinto) to pray for dead people who were killed in aviation accidents.

Chūhachi died of stomach cancer on 8 April 1936.

== See also ==
- Kokichi Ukita
- Ryōichi Yazu
