= Shigeno Kibe =

Japanese woman aviator

Shigeno Kibe 木部 シゲノ
- Born: Buzen, Fukuoka Prefecture
- Died: July 29, 1980 (aged 76); Buzen
- Education: Daiichi Aviation School
- Known for: the first Japanese women aviator licensed second class
- Awards: 1966: the sixth Order of the Precious Crown
- Aviation career
- Famous flights: acrobatics tour in cities across Japan
- Flight license: 1923: third class aviator 1927: second class aviator 1927: acrobatics

Shigeno Kibe（木部 シゲノ (Kibe Shigeno) (12 November 1903 – 29 July 1980) was an early female avitor in Japan.

== Biography ==
Born in Buzen, in east Fukuoka Prefecture, Shigeno Kibe and her family relocated to Namp'o, South Pyongan Province, Korea when she was three years old.

She moved to Tokyo in 1923 and was admitted to Daiichi Aviation School in Yokohama. She worked for a shipping company while training at school, obtained a driver's license, cut her hair short, and wore male attire that she kept her whole life. One year after graduation from the aviation school, she obtained the third class aviator license and she gained popularity as "a beauty in male attire" who traveled to cities, maneuvered aviation and gave lectures at many cities, and They issued her bromides for her admirers.

In August 1927 when Kibe became the first woman aviator licensed second class aviator, she planned to gain acrobatics license and applied to army aviation program which allowed civilians to join training. She arranged an interview with a commander at Kasumigaura Airfield of Imperial Japanese Navy Air Service, and he accepted her for exceptional ten days' probational trainee, and she obtained acrobatics license. That November, Kibe demonstrated aviation at three cities on Korean Peninsula, Namp'o, Pyongyang and present day Keijo aboard an Avro 504 K, with additional demo flights in August and September 1928 at several places in northern Kyushu including her hometown, Fukuoka and Kokura. It was during that she was seriously injured on 6 September 1928 at present day Fukuchi and canceled the tour. Her Ministry of Communications surplus Nieuport 24 – C1 fighter swayed in strong wind, touched its wing on an embankment and went down. Returning to Kanto region, she taught at Daiichi Aviation School as an assistant instructor.

Her retirement was in 1933 and she returned to Nam'po to operate a taxi company which she sold when gasoline supply was limited due to the Second Sino-Japanese War and moved to Beijing in 1938. She was an instructor for aviation, training students with sailplanes, and during the Pacific War, she worked as a supplementary member assisting military affairs.

After World War II, she returned from Beijing in 1948, participated in the founding of the Japan Ladies' Aviators Association, that appointed her as its President. Working from her office at Haneda Airport she toured and helped tourists in the facilities. She returned to Buzen at the later years of her life, and died in 1980.

The heroine of a very popular TV drama was said to be created using parts of her experience by NHK, titled Kumono Jutan (ja).

=== Honors ===
- Order of the Precious Crown, sixth rank, 1966—for her continued service to aviation
