= Ergis Arifi =

Albanian footballer (born 2007)

Personal information
- Date of birth: 11 January 2007 (age 19)
- Place of birth: Durrës, Albania
- Height: 1.82 m (6 ft 0 in)
- Positions: Attacking midfielder; second striker

Team information
- Current team: Teuta

Youth career
- 2016–2023: Teuta

Senior career*
Years	Team	Apps	(Gls)
2023–	Teuta	83	(5)

International career^{‡}
2021	Albania U15	1	(0)
2022–2023	Albania U17	3	(1)
2023	Albania U16	3	(0)
2023–2025	Albania U19	19	(0)
2026–	Albania U21	1	(0)
- * Club domestic league appearances and goals as of 16 May 2026 ‡ National team caps and goals as of 30 March 2026

Ergis Arifi (born 11 January 2007) is an Albanian professional footballer who plays as a Attacking midfielder for Kategoria Superiore club Teuta and the Albania national under-21 team.

A product of the club's youth academy, Arifi joined Teuta at the age of nine and progressed through the youth ranks before being promoted to the senior team in 2023. A versatile attacking midfielder, he is primarily deployed as an advanced playmaker, but is also capable of operating in central midfield or as a second striker. Despite his young age, he has been noted for his maturity, determination and high technical ability, establishing himself as an important member of the squad as he developed within the club system.

He has also represented Albania at various youth international levels, including the under-15, under-16, under-17, under-19 and under-21 national teams.

== Club career ==
Born in Durrës, Albania, Arifi joined Teuta's youth academy at the age of nine in 2016 and progressed through all age groups of the club before being promoted to the senior team in 2023.

On 15 March 2026, Arifi scored the only goal in Teuta's 1–0 away victory over Dinamo, securing all three points for his side and earning the "Man of the Match" award for his performance in a match described by the club as key in their push for a place in the 2025–26 Kategoria Superiore Final Four.
