= Petro Kasui Kibe =

Japanese Jesuit

Blessed Petro Kasui Kibe SJ
- Born: 1587; Bungo Province, Kyushu
- Died: July 4, 1639 (aged 52); Japan
- Venerated in: Catholic Church
- Beatified: 24 November 2008 by Pope Benedict XVI
- Feast: 4 July

Peter Kasui Kibe, SJ (Japanese: ペトロ・カスイ岐部, romanized: Petoro Kasui Kibe; born Kibe Shigekatsu, 岐部 茂勝; 1587 – 4 July 1639) was a Jesuit who was one of the first Japanese people to visit major cities west of his native Japan, such as Rome and Jerusalem. He was killed in 1639 and beatified as a martyr in 2008.

== Early life ==
Peter was born in 1587, in Bungo Province, to Christian parents.

In 1614, he was exiled to Portuguese Macau, after the emperor ordered a deportation order of Christians. He learned Latin and theology at a theological school in Macau. However, he and other Japanese knew it would be hard to be priests because of nationality discrimination, so they left the school to go to Rome.

He went to Portuguese Malacca and Goa in Portuguese India by ship, and then left for Europe on foot via Persia, the Strait of Hormuz and Baghdad, finally becoming the first Japanese Christian to arrive in Jerusalem. After a difficult journey that lasted three years he arrived in Rome after sailing through the Mediterranean Sea.

From Macau, a letter telling "Japanese who left Macau would go to Rome, but don't talk to them." was sent to Rome. However, in Rome, Jesuits examined Kibe and found out he had enough knowledge and was suited for a priest. On 15 November 1620, he became a Jesuit priest at age of 32 at the Basilica of St. John Lateran.

Afterward, he was trained for two years at a Jesuit training school in Rome, and took his vows as a Jesuit priest in Lisbon. In 1623, he departed for India with twenty Jesuits. Next year, he arrived at Goa via Cape of Good Hope.

== Return to Japan ==
Kibe made the decision to return to Japan; a dangerous undertaking due to the decision of Tokugawa Ieyasu to ban Christianity and the entry of Christian missionaries, owing to the perceived poor behaviour of the Jesuits. Kibe had difficulty finding a ship which would allow him to board. He traveled around Southeast Asia, and then finally he succeeded in boarding a ship from Manila to Japan in 1630. The ship wrecked but reached Kagoshima in southern Japan. He returned to Japan sixteen years after he left home.

Kibe hid himself and escaped from severe oppression and exposure. He went to northeast Japan via Nagasaki and encouraged Christians. In 1639, he was caught when he was hiding at the home of a Christian and was arrested. Sent to Edo, Kibe was tortured severely, but did not convert, encouraging other prisoners to also refuse to do so. As a result, the infuriated guards pulled him out of the hole and executed him via spearing.

== Legacy ==
In Kibe Kunimi-town Kunisaki-city Oita prefecture, there is the Father Kibe Memorial Park which was founded by Father Sekki. Kibe's statue which is made by Yasutake Funakoshi stands at the park. On May 7, 2006, the Roman Curia Congregation for the Causes of Saints decided Father Kibe and other 187 Japanese Christians who were martyred should be declared blessed.

The beatification of Peter Kibe and 187 other martyrs took place on November 24, 2008, in Nagasaki. For the liturgical celebration in Nagasaki Stadium more than 30,000 participants attended.

On July 1, 2022 the first icon of Kibe was revealed by Japanese Jesuits. It was a commission carried out by artist Aleksandr Griaznov.
