= Kibe (footballer) =

Brazilian footballer

Personal information
- Full name: Jefferson Pessanha Agostinho
- Date of birth: 13 March 2000 (age 26)
- Place of birth: Rio de Janeiro, Brazil
- Height: 1.91 m (6 ft 3 in)
- Position: Forward

Team information
- Current team: Nagaworld
- Number: 20

Youth career
- São José-RS
- Marítimo

Senior career*
Years	Team	Apps	(Gls)
2019−2023	Marítimo B	29	(9)
2020−2023	Marítimo	6	(0)
2022–2023	→ Canelas 2010 (loan)	8	(2)
2023–2024	Bylis	25	(8)
2024–2025	Leixões	9	(1)
2025–2026	Marco 09	15	(2)
2026–	Nagaworld	7	(4)
- * Club domestic league appearances and goals as of 9 November 2026

Jefferson Pessanha Agostinho (born 13 March 2000), known simply as Kibe, is a Brazilian professional footballer who plays for Portuguese Cambodian Premier League club Nagaworld as a forward.

== Professional career ==
Kibe made his professional debut with Marítimo in a 1-0 Primeira Liga loss to Vitória S.C. on 19 July 2020.
