= Vaqarr =

Village in Albania

- Administrative unit
- Location within Albania
- Coordinates: 41°18′N 19°45′E
- Country: Albania
- County: Tirana
- Municipality: Tirana
  - Administrative unit: 45.71 km^{2} (17.65 sq mi)

Population (2023)
  - Administrative unit: 9,221
  - Administrative unit density: 201.7/km^{2} (522.5/sq mi)
- Time zone: UTC+1 (CET)
  - Summer (DST): UTC+2 (CEST)
- Postal Code: 1041
- Area Code: (0)48

Vaqarr (Albanian: [vacar]) is a village and administrative unit in the municipality of Tirana, central Albania. As of the 2011 census, the administrative unit of Vaqarr had an estimated population of 9,106 of whom 4,838 were men and 4,268 women. The Lake of Vaqarr has become a popular recreation area in the municipality of Tirana.

Historical population
Year	Pop.	±%
1989	7,720	—
2001	7,732	+0.2%
2011	9,106	+17.8%
2023	9,221	+1.3%
