= List of Kategoria Superiore hat-tricks =

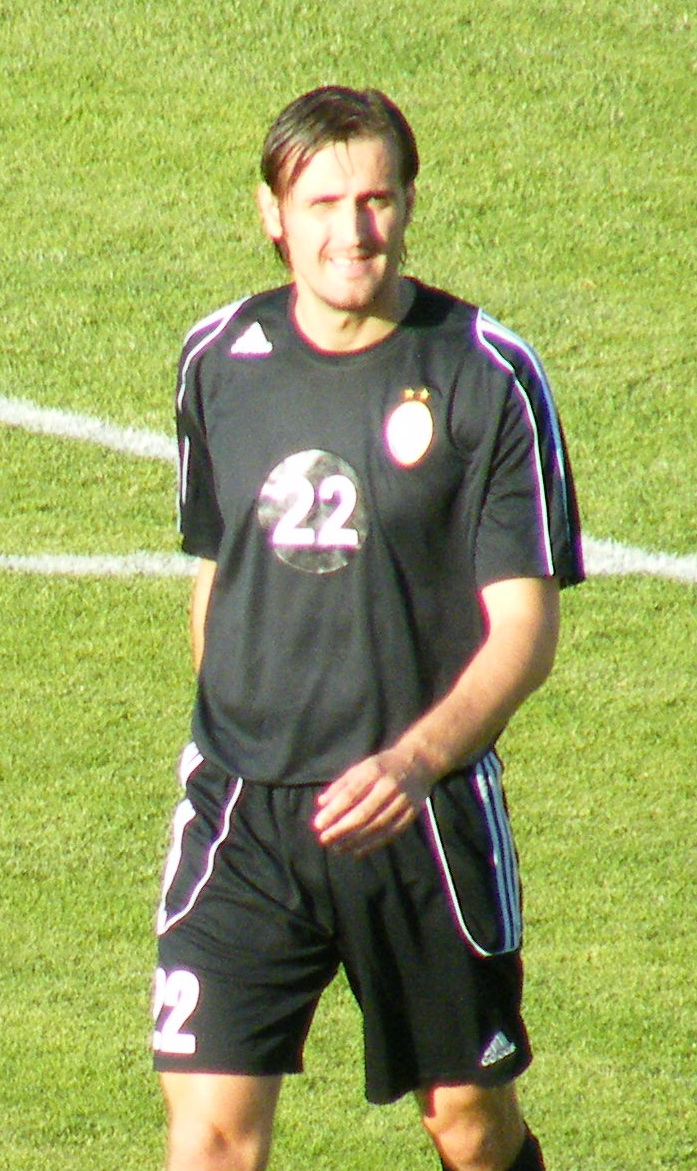
Pero Pejić scored seven Kategoria Superiore hat-tricks, for Dinamo Tirana, Skënderbeu Korçë and Kukësi.

Below is the list of players that have scored a hat-trick in a Kategoria Superiore match since the beginning of the league in 1930. The first edition was held in 1911, but it is not officially recognized by AFA.

The fixture between Besëlidhja Lezhë and Tomori Berat at Lezhë in 2001 saw both Xhelal Farruku and Gëzim Tabaku score a hat-trick for the home team, while Kliton Cafi scored three goals of Tomori. This is also the only match in which three players have scored a hat-trick. Refik Resmja is the only player in history to score a hat-trick in four consecutive matches, while Indrit Fortuzi and Pero Pejić are the only players to score a hat-trick in two consecutive matches. Resmja is also the only player to score six and seven goals in one match, while he, Roland Dervishi, Dorian Bylykbashi and Indrit Fortuzi are the only players to have scored five goals in one match.

Refik Resmja has scored three or more goals in ten times in the Kategoria Superiore, more than any other player. He has set this record in only one season, during 1951 Albanian Superliga season where he scored 59 goals in only 23 matches, being followed by Vioresin Sinani with nine hat-tricks and Croatian forward Pero Pejić with seven hat-tricks; Hamdi Salihi has scored six hat-trick while Indrit Fortuzi and Daniel Xhafa have scored five hat-tricks each. Only two players have each scored hat-tricks for three clubs: Pero Pejić (Dinamo Tirana, Skënderbeu Korçë and Kukësi) and Daniel Xhafa (Bylis Ballsh, Teuta Durrës and Besa Kavajë).

== Hat-tricks ==
Key
^{4}	Player scored four goals
^{5}	Player scored five goals
^{6}	Player scored six goals
^{7}	Player scored seven goals
†	Player scored hat-trick as a substitute
*	The home team

Note: The results column shows the home team score first

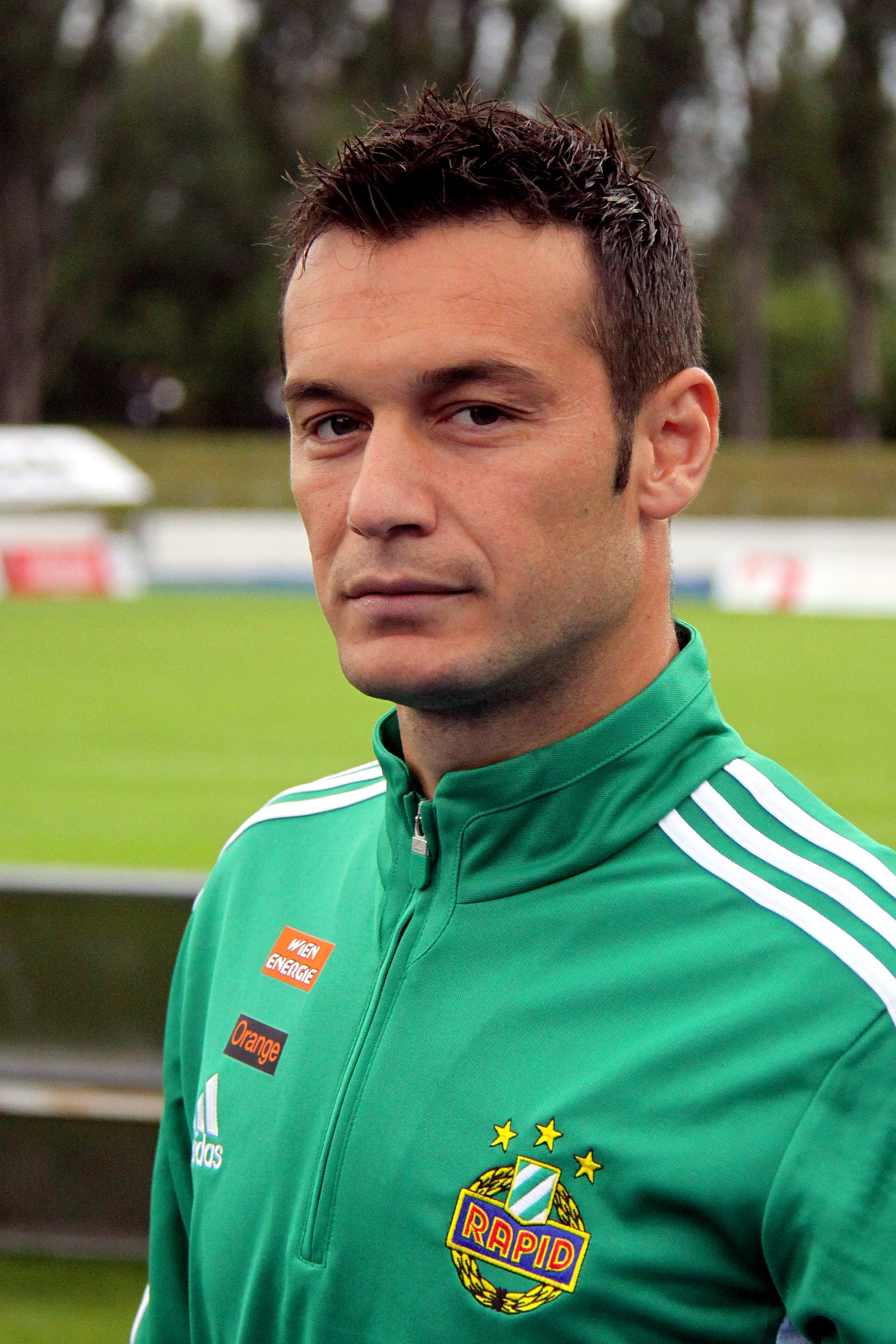
Hamdi Salihi scored five hat-tricks for Vllaznia Shkodër and Tirana between 2002 and 2007.

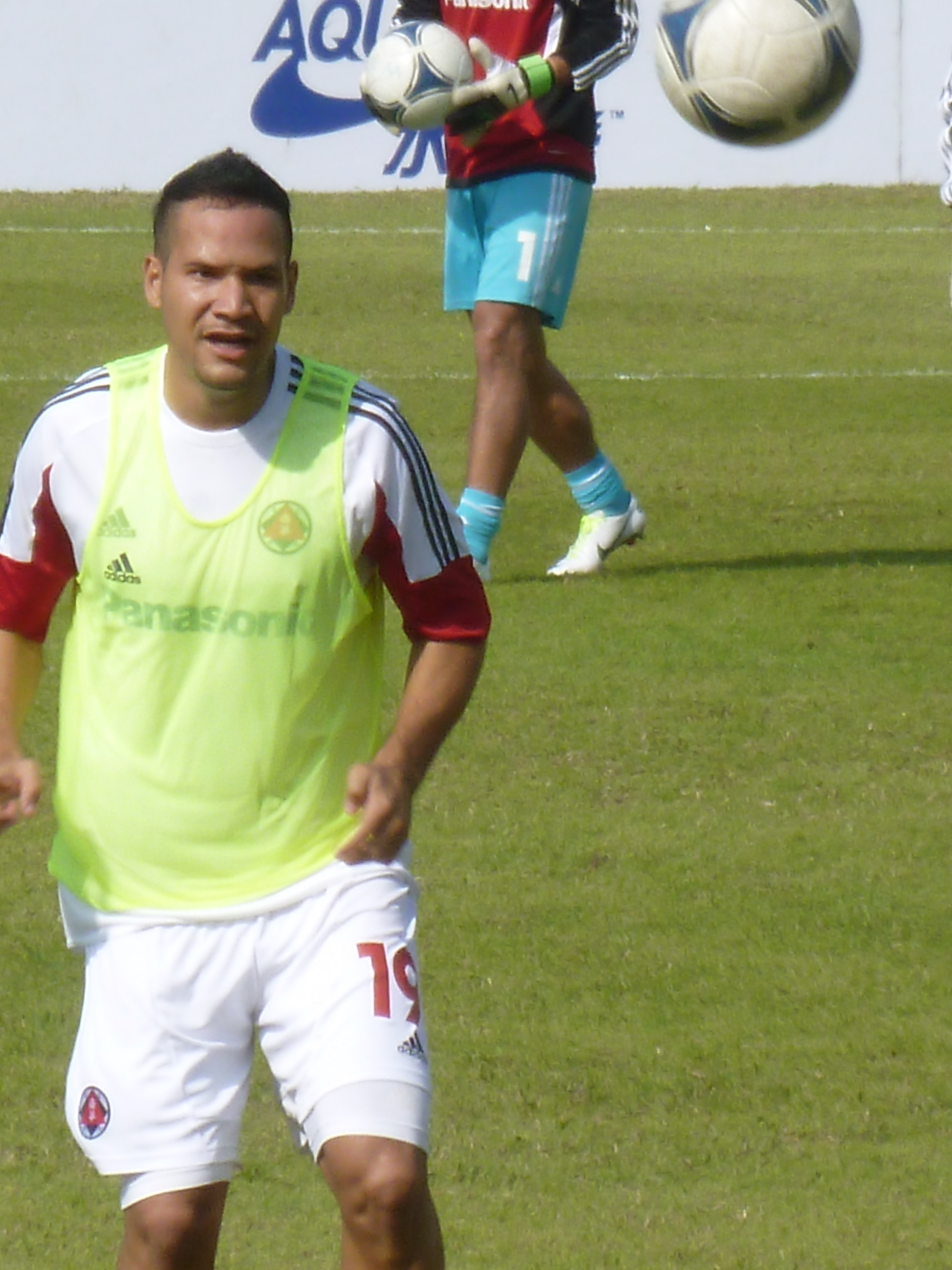
Dhiego Martins scored the first hat-trick of 2014–15 season.

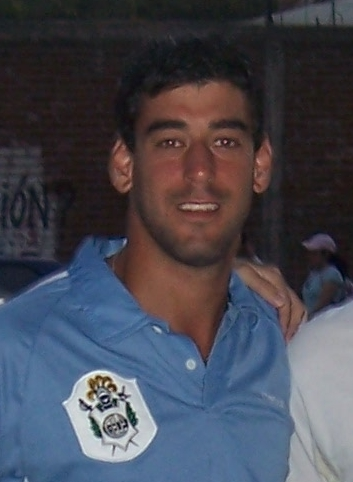
Néstor Martirena is the first and only Argentine to score a hat-trick in Albanian Superliga

.

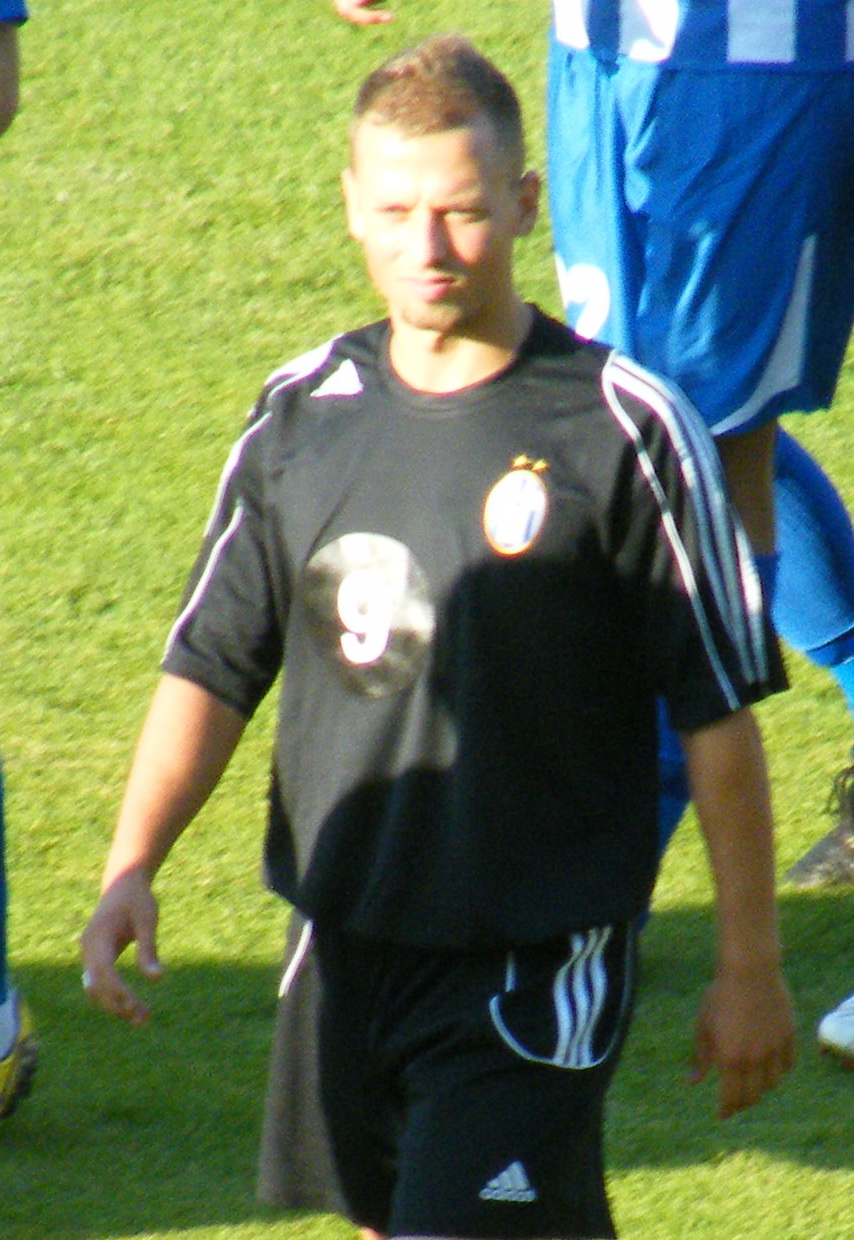
Sebino Plaku scored his first and only hat-trick on 25 April 2009.

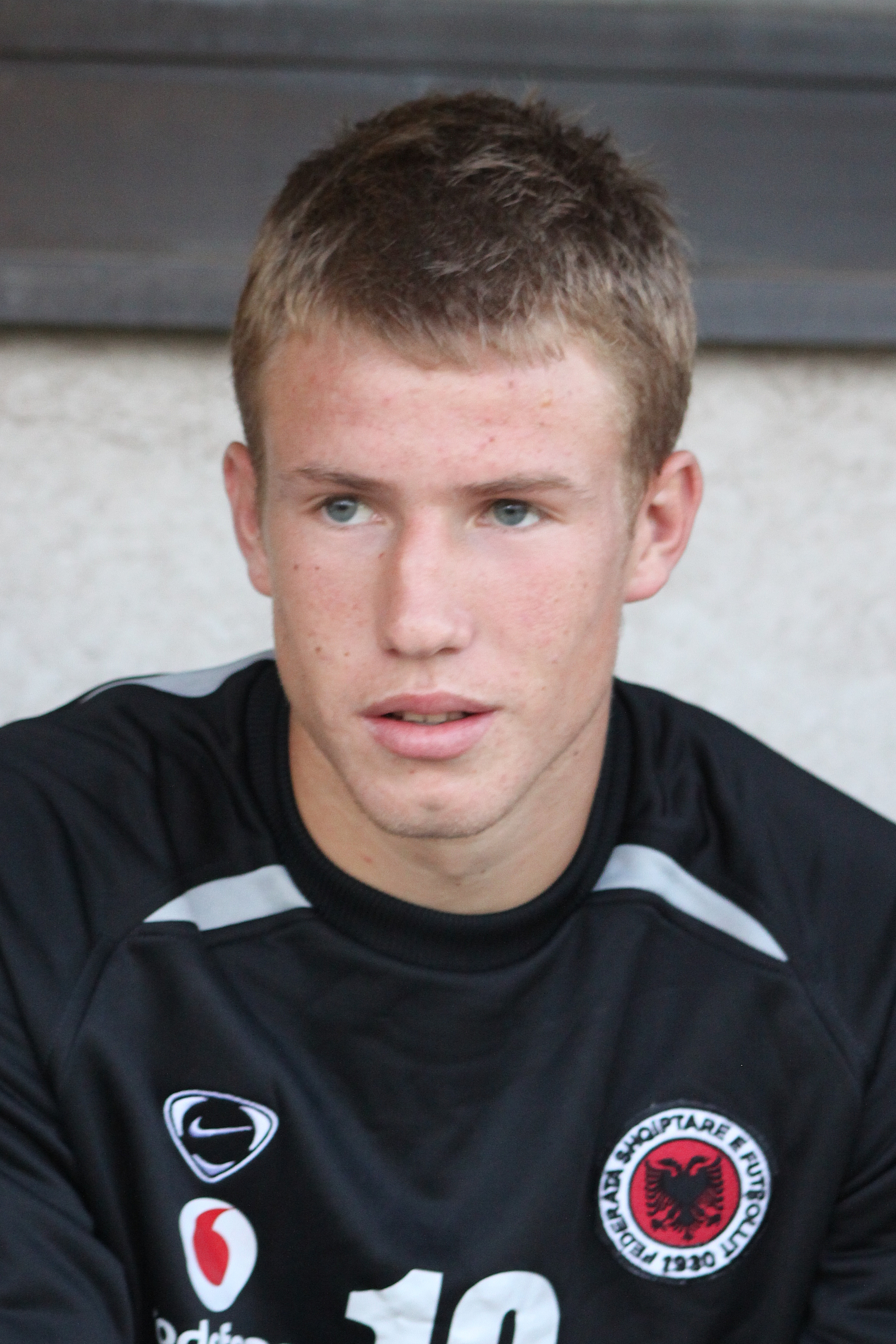
Bekim Balaj is the youngest player to score a hat-trick at 21 years. 9 months and 12 days.

Player	Nationality	For	Against	Result	Date	Ref
Refik Resmja^{7}	Albania	Partizani Tirana*	Puna Berat	14–0	31 January 1951	
Refik Resmja^{6}	Albania	Partizani Tirana	Puna Gjirokastër*	8–0	18 February 1951	
Refik Resmja^{7}	Albania	Partizani Tirana*	Puna Fier	11–0	25 February 1951	
Refik Resmja^{7}	Albania	Partizani Tirana*	Spartaku Qyteti Stalin	9–0	4 March 1951	
Refik Resmja^{4}	Albania	Partizani Tirana	Puna Kavajë*	6–0	12 March 1951	
Refik Resmja	Albania	Partizani Tirana*	Puna Durrës	6–0	15 April 1951	
Refik Resmja	Albania	Partizani Tirana*	Puna Tiranë	6–0	6 May 1951	
Refik Resmja^{4}	Albania	Partizani Tirana	Spartak Shkodër*	6–0	13 May 1951	
Refik Resmja^{4}	Albania	Partizani Tirana	Puna Fier*	6–0	27 May 1951	
Refik Resmja^{5}	Albania	Partizani Tirana	Spartaku Qyteti Stalin*	11–0	3 June 1951	
Agim Murati	Albania	Partizani Tirana*	Tirana	3–2	28 December 1980	
Arben Minga	Albania	Tirana*	Partizani Tirana	7–3	22 September 1985	
Rigels Qose	Albania	Skënderbeu Korçë	Partizani Tirana*	3–2	21 April 2000	
Klodian Arberi	Albania	Tomori Berat*	Bylis Ballsh	4–3	28 April 2000	
Daniel Xhafaj	Albania	Bylis Ballsh	Tomori Berat*	4–2	28 April 2000	
Anesti Vito	Albania	Tirana*	Dinamo Tirana	4–0	23 May 2000	
Indrit Fortuzi^{5}	Albania	Tirana	Apolonia Fier*	5–0	28 September 2000	
Mahir Halili	Albania	Tirana*	Lushnja	7–1	13 October 2000	
Indrit Fortuzi^{4}	Albania	Tirana*	Besëlidhja Lezhë	6–0	27 October 2000	
Indrit Fortuzi	Albania	Tirana*	Besa Kavajë	3–0	4 May 2001	
Xhelal Farruku	Albania	Besëlidhja Lezhë*	Tomori Berat	6–3	18 May 2001	
Gëzim Tabaku	Albania	Besëlidhja Lezhë*	Tomori Berat	6–3	18 May 2001	
Kliton Cafi	Albania	Tomori Berat*	Besëlidhja Lezhë	6–3	18 May 2001	
Indrit Fortuzi	Albania	Tirana*	Bylis Ballsh	6–0	9 November 2001	
Indrit Fortuzi	Albania	Tirana	Tomori Berat*	4–0	16 November 2001	
Carioca^{4}	Brazil	Partizani Tirana*	Apolonia Fier	4–0	1 December 2001	
Edi Martini^{4}	Albania	Vllaznia Shkodër*	Erzeni Shijak	6–0	1 March 2002	
Artan Bano	Albania	Lushnja*	Shkumbini Peqin	4–0	22 March 2002	
Fatjon Ymeri	Albania	Erzeni Shijak*	Teuta Durrës	3–2	26 April 2002	
Albert Kaçi	Albania	Vllaznia Shkodër*	Tomori Berat	7–1	10 May 2002	
Gentian Begeja	Albania	Teuta Durrës*	Flamurtari Vlorë	3–1	29 November 2002	
Bledar Mançaku	Albania	Teuta Durrës*	Besa Kavajë	5–0	13 December 2002	
Elton Ceno	Albania	Shkumbini Peqin	Bylis Ballsh*	4–0	7 March 2003	
Bledar Mançaku	Albania	Teuta Durrës*	Apolonia Fier	3–1	19 April 2003	
Gentian Stojku	Albania	Elbasani*	Bylis Ballsh	6–1	26 April 2002	
Dorian Bubeqi	Albania	Shkumbini Peqin*	Flamurtari Vlorë	4–1	3 May 2003	
Mahir Halili	Albania	Tirana	Partizani Tirana*	3–1	3 May 2003	
Mahir Halili^{4}	Albania	Tirana*	Bylis Ballsh	6–1	9 May 2003	
Vaske Ruko	Albania	Apolonia Fier	Vllaznia Shkodër*	3–2	23 May 2003	
Carioca	Brazil	Partizani Tirana*	Besa Kavajë	4–5	23 May 2003	
Ilir Qorri^{4}	Albania	Dinamo Tirana	Shkumbini Peqin*	4–1	29 August 2003	
Edi Martini	Albania	Vllaznia Shkodër*	Shkumbini Peqin	4–0	17 October 2003	
Vioresin Sinani	Albania	Vllaznia Shkodër*	Besa Kavajë	3–1	12 December 2003	
Daniel Xhafaj	Albania	Teuta Durrës*	Besa Kavajë	4–1	23 December 2003	
Gjergji Muzaka	Albania	Partizani Tirana*	Dinamo Tirana	5–2	25 February 2004	
Vioresin Sinani	Albania	Vllaznia Shkodër*	Partizani Tirana	3–1	3 April 2004	
Erjon Rizvanolli	Albania	Shkumbini Peqin*	Flamurtari Vlorë	4–0	1 May 2004	
Vioresin Sinani^{4}	Albania	Vllaznia Shkodër*	Besa Kavajë	6–0	7 May 2004	
Skerdi Bejzade	Albania	Besa Kavajë*	Partizani Tirana	3–4	14 May 2004	
Abílio	Brazil	Vllaznia Shkodër	Shkumbini Peqin*	5–3	15 October 2004	
Hamdi Salihi	Albania	Vllaznia Shkodër*	Laçi	7–0	22 October 2004	
Kreshnik Ivanaj	Albania	Shkumbini Peqin*	Laçi	5–1	12 November 2004	
Hamdi Salihi	Albania	Vllaznia Shkodër	Laçi*	7–1	17 December 2004	
Skerdi Bejzade	Albania	Elbasani*	Laçi	7–0	14 January 2005	
Vioresin Sinani	Albania	Vllaznia Shkodër*	Laçi	8–0	4 March 2005	
Daniel Xhafaj	Albania	Teuta Durrës*	Laçi	5–0	23 April 2005	
Daniel Xhafaj	Albania	Teuta Durrës*	Tirana	3–5	6 May 2005	
Altin Rraklli	Albania	Tirana	Teuta Durrës*	5–3	6 May 2005	
Dorian Bylykbashi	Albania	Partizani Tirana	Shkumbini Peqin*	4–3	14 May 2005	
Dorian Bylykbashi^{5}	Albania	Partizani Tirana*	Laçi	5–5	20 May 2005	
Hamdi Salihi	Albania	Tirana*	Shkumbini Peqin	4–4	10 November 2005	
Hamdi Salihi	Albania	Tirana	Skënderbeu Korçë*	3–4	29 November 2005	
Vioresin Sinani^{4}	Albania	Vllaznia Shkodër*	Besa Kavajë	5–2	17 February 2006	
Dorian Bubeqi	Albania	Besa Kavajë*	Lushnja	6–0	17 March 2006	
Skerdi Bejzade	Albania	Lushnja*	Elbasani	4–2	14 April 2006	
Vioresin Sinani	Albania	Tirana*	Kastroti Krujë	7–3	8 September 2006	
Hamdi Salihi	Albania	Tirana*	Kastroti Krujë	7–3	8 September 2006	
Roland Nenaj	Albania	Flamurtari Vlorë*	Apolonia Fier	4–0	8 September 2006	
Daniel Xhafaj	Albania	Teuta Durres*	Apolonia Fier	4–1	4 May 2007	
Pero Pejić^{4}	Croatia	Dinamo Tirana*	Shkumbini Peqin	5–0	5 May 2007	
Marius Ngjela	Albania	Skënderbeu Korçë*	Tirana	4–2	15 September 2007	
Pero Pejić	Croatia	Dinamo Tirana*	Kastroti Krujë	4–0	15 September 2007	
Skerdi Bejzade	Albania	Elbasani*	Skënderbeu Korçë	4–0	29 September 2007	
Vioresin Sinani	Albania	Vllaznia Shkodër	Teuta Durrës*	3–0	31 October 2007	
Pero Pejić^{4}	Croatia	Dinamo Tirana*	Skënderbeu Korçë	7–0	28 December 2007	
Vioresin Sinani	Albania	Vllaznia Shkodër*	Tirana	4–1	28 December 2007	
Klodian Duro	Albania	Tirana*	Vllaznia Shkodër	5–1	19 April 2008	
Migen Memelli	Albania	Tirana*	Flamurtari Vlorë	3–1	27 September 2008	
Migen Memelli^{4}	Albania	Tirana*	Bylis Ballsh	6–2	27 December 2008	
Xhevahir Sukaj	Albania	Vllaznia Shkodër*	Besa Kavajë	4–1	4 February 2009	
Fatjon Sefa	Albania	Dinamo Tirana*	Apolonia Fier	3–2	15 February 2009	
Sebino Plaku	Albania	Dinamo Tirana*	Shkumbini Peqin	3–0	25 April 2009	
Edi Çajku	Albania	Skënderbeu Korçë*	Gramozi Ersekë	4–1	19 September 2009	
Fatjon Sefa	Albania	Dinamo Tirana*	Vllaznia Shkodër	4–2	16 December 2009	
Daniel Xhafaj	Albania	Besa Kavajë*	Gramozi Ersekë	6–4	14 May 2010	
Bekim Kuli	Albania	Shkumbini Peqin*	Skënderbeu Korçë	3–1	12 September 2010	
Néstor Martirena	Argentina	Dinamo Tirana	Vllaznia Shkodër*	4–0	25 September 2010	
Mladen Brkić	Serbia	Skënderbeu Korçë*	Kastroti Krujë	5–1	24 October 2010	
Vioresin Sinani	Albania	Vllaznia Shkodër	Teuta Durrës*	3–0	30 January 2011	
Mate Dragičević	Croatia	Laçi	Shkumbini Peqin*	5–2	11 March 2011	
Brunild Pepa	Albania	Teuta Durrës*	Besa Kavajë	4–2	16 April 2011	
Xhevahir Sukaj	Albania	Vllaznia Shkodër*	Laçi	3–1	10 September 2011	
Roland Dervishi^{5}	Albania	Shkumbini Peqin*	Tomori Berat	6–2	1 October 2011	
Bekim Balaj	Albania	Tirana*	Bylis Ballsh	3–2	23 October 2011	
Endri Bakiu^{4}	Albania	Tomori Berat	Apolonia Fier*	6–5	12 May 2012	
Roland Dervishi	Albania	Shkumbini Peqin	Vllaznia Shkodër*	4–4	12 May 2012	
Pero Pejić	Croatia	Skënderbeu Korçë	Vllaznia Shkodër*	3–1	24 August 2012	
Migen Memelli	Albania	Flamurtari Vlorë	Luftëtari Gjirokastër*	3–2	27 October 2012	
Solomonson Izuchukwuka	Nigeria	Bylis Ballsh*	Laçi	4–0	28 October 2012	
Migen Memelli	Albania	Flamurtari Vlorë*	Bylis Ballsh	3–0	13 February 2013	
Lazar Popović	Serbia	Kukësi*	Shkumbini Peqin	5–1	30 March 2013	
Julian Malo	Albania	Partizani Tirana*	Teuta Durrës	3–0	9 November 2013	
Joel Apezteguía^{4}	Cuba	Teuta Durrës*	Lushnja	6–2	2 February 2014	
Fatjon Sefa	Albania	Besa Kavajë*	Lushnja	3–0	26 April 2014	
Sokol Cikalleshi	Albania	Kukësi*	Lushnja	4–1	4 May 2014	
Dhiego Martins	Brazil	Skënderbeu Korçë*	Apolonia Fier	6–0	23 November 2014	
Pero Pejić	Croatia	Kukësi*	Elbasani	3–0	31 January 2015	
Pero Pejić	Croatia	Kukësi	Teuta Durrës*	3–2	9 May 2015	
Andi Ribaj	Albania	Apolonia Fier*	Elbasani	4–1	9 May 2015	
Pero Pejić	Croatia	Kukësi*	Tirana	3–2	17 May 2015	
Hamdi Salihi	Albania	Skënderbeu Korçë*	Flamurtari Vlorë	5–1	20 March 2016	
Elis Bakaj	Albania	Tirana*	Tërbuni Pukë	3–0	3 April 2016	
Xhevahir Sukaj	Albania	Partizani Tirana*	Tërbuni Pukë	4–0	30 April 2016	
Liridon Latifi	Albania	Skënderbeu Korçë	Laçi*	5–1	23 April 2017	
Pero Pejić	Croatia	Kukësi	Korabi Peshkopi*	3–1	15 May 2017	
Reginaldo Faife	Mozambique	Laçi*	Flamurtari Vlorë	4–2	10 March 2018	
Sindrit Guri	Albania	Kukësi*	Partizani Tirana	4–0	14 April 2018	
Ali Sowe	Gambia	Skënderbeu Korçë	Lushnja*	4–2	9 May 2018	
Reginaldo Faife	Mozambique	Kukësi*	Tirana	3–1	2 September 2018	
Ismael Dunga	Kenya	Luftëtari Gjirokastër	Partizani Tirana*	3–1	6 April 2019	
Eraldo Çinari^{4}	Albania	Partizani Tirana*	Luftëtari Gjirokastër	8–1	14 June 2020	
Vasil Shkurtaj	Albania	Kukësi*	Flamurtari Vlorë	4–1	15 June 2020	
Sherif Kallaku	Albania	Teuta Durrës	Luftëtari Gjirokastër*	5–1	20 June 2020	
Ardit Hoxhaj	Albania	Flamurtari Vlorë*	Luftëtari Gjirokastër	6–1	27 June 2020	
Redon Xhixha	Albania	Tirana*	Teuta Durrës	4–0	16 September 2022	
Redon Xhixha	Albania	Tirana*	Laçi	3–3	7 October 2022	
Patrick	Brazil	Tirana*	Bylis Ballsh	4–0	21 January 2023	
Florent Hasani	Kosovo	Tirana*	Erzeni Shijak	3–1	2 April 2023	
Raphael Dwamena	Ghana	Egnatia Rrogozhinë*	Erzeni Shijak	4–3	13 September 2023	
Archange Bintsouka	Congo	Partizani Tirana*	Kukësi	4–3	8 October 2023	
Ildi Gruda	Albania	Vllaznia Shkodër*	Skënderbeu Korçë	5–0	22 December 2023	
Arsen Lleshi	Albania	Elbasani*	Teuta Durrës	3–1	11 January 2025	
Bekim Balaj	Albania	Vllaznia Shkodër*	Skënderbeu Korçë	4–0	19 January 2025	
Saleh Nasr	Egypt	Skënderbeu Korçë*	Dinamo City	4–1	30 March 2025	
Soumaila Bakayoko	Ivory Coast	Egnatia Rrogozhinë*	Bylis Ballsh	5–1	22 September 2025	
Ibrahim Mustapha	Nigeria	Bylis Ballsh*	Elbasani	3–2	20 December 2025	
Daniel Adjessa	Cameroon	Egnatia Rrogozhinë*	Bylis Ballsh	3–0	4 April 2026	
Erald Maksuti	Albania	Flamurtari Vlorë*	Dinamo City	3–1	28 April 2026	
Bernard Karrica	Albania	Vora*	Partizani Tirana	4–1	18 October 2026	

== Multiple hat-tricks ==
The following table lists the minimum number of hat-tricks scored by players who have scored two or more hat-tricks.

Bold are still active in the Albanian Superliga.

Rank	Player	Hat-tricks	Last hat-trick
1	(Albania) Refik Resmja	10	3 June 1951
2	(Albania) Vioresin Sinani	9	30 January 2011
3	(Croatia) Pero Pejić	8	15 May 2017
4	(Albania) Hamdi Salihi	6	20 March 2016
5	(Albania) Indrit Fortuzi	5	16 November 2001
5	(Albania) Daniel Xhafaj	5	14 May 2011
7	(Albania) Skerdi Bejzade	4	29 September 2007
7	(Albania) Migen Memelli	4	13 February 2013
9	(Albania) Mahir Halili	3	9 May 2003
9	(Albania) Fatjon Sefa	3	26 April 2014
9	(Albania) Xhevahir Sukaj	3	30 April 2016
12	(Albania) Dorian Bubeqi	2	17 March 2006
12	(Albania) Dorian Bylykbashi	2	20 May 2005
12	(Brazil) Carioca	2	23 May 2003
12	(Albania) Bledar Mançaku	2	19 April 2003
12	(Albania) Edi Martini	2	17 October 2003
12	(Mozambique) Reginaldo Faife	2	2 September 2018
12	(Albania) Redon Xhixha	2	7 October 2022
12	(Albania) Bekim Balaj	2	19 January 2025
20	(Albania) Bernard Karrica	1	18 October 2026

== See also ==
- Albanian Superliga
- Albanian Superliga Player of the Month
- List of Albanian Superliga all-time goalscorers
