= Sindrit Guri =

Albanian footballer (born 1993)

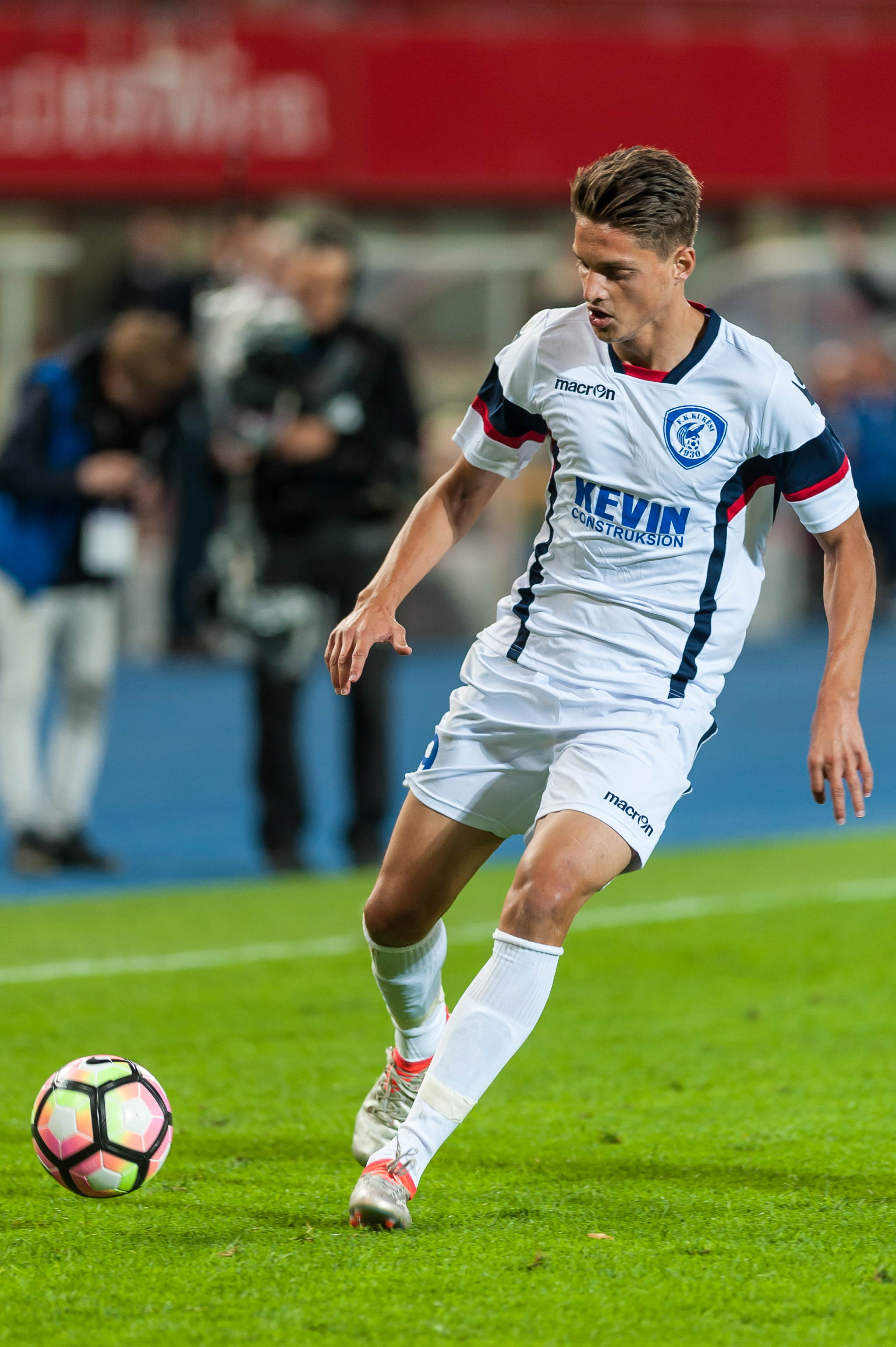
- Guri playing for Kukësi in the UEFA Europa League in 2016

Personal information
- Date of birth: 23 October 1993 (age 33)
- Place of birth: Shkodër, Albania
- Height: 1.89 m (6 ft 2 in)
- Position: Forward

Team information
- Current team: Varesina
- Number: 10

Youth career
- 2005–2011: Shkodra

Senior career*
Years	Team	Apps	(Gls)
2011–2015	Vllaznia	20	(1)
2013–2014	→ Besa (loan)	27	(1)
2014–2015	→ Kastrioti (loan)	11	(0)
2015–2016	Korabi	27	(20)
2016–2018	Kukësi	59	(22)
2018–2021	Oostende	48	(5)
2021–2022	Shkëndija	25	(10)
2022–2023	İstanbulspor	12	(0)
2023–2024	Città di Varese	9	(1)
2024	Prishtina	0	(0)
2024–	Varesina	2	(0)

International career^{‡}
2011	Albania U18	2	(0)
2011	Albania U19	3	(0)
2018	Albania	2	(0)
- * Club domestic league appearances and goals as of 15 September 2024 ‡ National team caps and goals as of 7 September 2018

Sindrit Guri (born 23 October 1993) is an Albanian professional footballer who plays as a forward for Italian Serie D club Varesina and the Albania national team.

== Club career ==
=== Early career ===
Guri first joined local side Vllaznia in 2005 at the age of 12, where he played for the academy side at different age groups before being promoted to the first team during the 2011–12 season, where he made his professional debut in an Kategoria Superiore match against Apolonia on 19 November 2011, coming on as a late substitute for Xhevahir Sukaj in the 4–1 away win. He went on to make 9 league and 2 cup appearances under Rudi Vata during his debut season, as his side finished mid table in the league and reached the quarter-finals of the Albanian Cup.

=== Kukësi ===
On 7 June 2016, Guri joined Kukësi on a free transfer, returning in Kategoria Superiore after one season absence. He was presented on the same day where he officially signed the contract.

On 7 July, in the second leg of 2016–17 UEFA Europa League first qualifying round against Rudar Pljevlja, Guri made his Kukësi debut as well as his European debut by coming on as a second-half substitute and scored the winner in the 79th minute, helping the team to win 1–0 and to progress to the second round with the aggregate 2–1.

Guri become Kukësi's first striker for the 2017–18 season following the departure of Pero Pejić and Izair Emini. He made his UEFA Champions League debut on 12 July in the first leg of second qualifying round versus Sheriff Tiraspol as Kukësi lost 0–1. He also played in the returning leg at Elbasan Arena as Kukësi won 2–1 but was eliminated on away goal rule.

Guri begun the domestic season on 6 September by playing in the 2017 Albanian Supercup against Tirana as Kukësi lost 0–1 at Selman Stërmasi Stadium. He scored his first goals of the season in form of a brace in the 4–0 home win over Egnatia in the first leg of 2017–18 Albanian Cup first round. Guri's first league goal came on matchday 5 at newbie Lushnja, netting the opener with a shot from 25 yards as Kukësi won 2–0. He added another two at cup as Kukësi won 4–1 at Erzeni in the first leg of second round.

Guri enjoyed a fine form in 2018, notably netting in each leg of cup's quarter-final as Kukësi saw off Tirana to progress to semi-finals; he reached double-figures in the process. This was followed by a brace in the league encounter versus Partizani, including one in the 96th minute as Kukësi won 3–1 to continue their battle for the second position. His performances were rewarded as he was named Kategoria Superiore Player of the Month for February 2018.

On 8 April, Guri confirmed that he would leave Kukësi at the end of 2017–18 season with the aim of playing with a top league club. Six days later, he scored three goals, including a free-kick, in the 4–0 home win over third-placed team Partizani, recording his first top flight hat-trick. He also reached the 20-goal landmark and also become the first player to score a hat-trick versus capital club since Skerdi Bejzade in 2004. Later that month, he scored a second-half winner against Skënderbeu to give Kukësi the first win at the opposition turf since September 2013. His performances earned him another Player of the Month award, becoming the first player in history to win in twice in a season.

On the final day of the season, Guri scored a free-kick in the 2–2 home draw versus Flamurtari to finish the season with 21 goals from 34 appearances, one goal short from winning the Golden Boot. He also scored 7 goals in Albanian Cup, finishing it as top scorer jointly with Laçi's Redon Xhixha.

=== Oostende ===
On 15 May 2018, it was announced that Guri would join K.V. Oostende of Belgian First Division A, on a three-year contract starting from 1 July. Kukësi earned €710,000 from the transfer and also retained part ownership. Guri however joined the team in mid-June and scored a brace in his first match for his new side.

He made his official debut for the team on 28 July in the opening match of championship versus Royal Excel Mouscron, setting up the first goal in an eventual 2–1 home win. Guri's first goal came in his second appearance for the club on 5 August, netting in the second half of the 5–2 loss to Anderlecht.

=== Shkëndija ===
On 4 September 2021, he joined Shkëndija in the Macedonian First Football League on a one-year deal.

=== İstanbulspor ===
On 26 August 2022, Guri signed a three-year contract with Turkish Süper Lig club İstanbulspor. In July 2023, the Istanbul-based side announced that Guri's contract had been terminated by mutual agreement.

=== Città di Varese ===
On 26 September 2023, Guri joined Italian Serie D club Città di Varese.

=== Prishtina ===
On 4 March 2024, Guri signed a precontract with Kosovo Superleague club Prishtina, and this transfer would become legally effective in July 2024.

== International career ==
Guri was called up to the Albania U19 side for the 2012 UEFA European Under-19 Championship qualification. He made his debut on 5 October 2011 in the 1–0 defeat to Denmark, where he played for 57 minutes. He went on to play the remaining two matches as Albania finished the Group 12 in the third position, failing to secure a spot for 2012 UEFA European Under-19 Championship.

On 21 May 2018, following a good run on club level, Guri received his first senior call-up by manager Christian Panucci for the friendlies against Kosovo and Ukraine. He started the game against Kosovo, thus earning his first senior cap, making a good overall performance for around 70 minutes before making place for defender Mërgim Mavraj.

== Style of play ==
Guri is a striker known for his goal-scoring ability.A technically skilled player, he is also effective in aerial duels.

== Personal life ==
Guri currently resideis in Tirana; he is married and has a child, born in 2016. He stated that his favourite footballer is Argentine international Lionel Messi.

== Career statistics ==
=== Club ===
As of match played 30 May 2023

Appearances and goals by club, season and competition
Club	Season	League			Cup		Continental		Other		Total	
Club	Season	Division	Apps	Goals	Apps	Goals	Apps	Goals	Apps	Goals	Apps	Goals
Vllaznia	2011–12	Kategoria Superiore	9	0	2	0	0	0	—		11	0
Vllaznia	2012–13	Kategoria Superiore	4	1	3	2	—		—		7	3
Vllaznia	2014–15	Kategoria Superiore	7	0	0	0	—		—		7	0
Vllaznia	Total		20	1	5	2	0	0	—		25	3
Besa (loan)	2013–14	Kategoria Superiore	27	1	0	0	—		—		27	1
Kastrioti	2014–15	Kategoria e Parë	11	0	2	0	—		—		13	0
Korabi	2015–16	Kategoria e Parë	27	20	0	0	—		—		27	20
Kukësi	2016–17	Kategoria Superiore	25	2	5	2	3 (Note: Appearance(s) in UEFA Europa League)	1	0	0	33	5
Kukësi	2017–18	Kategoria Superiore	34	20	7	7	2 (Note: Appearance(s) in UEFA Champions League)	0	1 (Note: Appearance in Albanian Supercup)	0	44	27
Kukësi	Total		59	22	12	9	5	1	1	0	77	32
Oostende	2018–19	Belgian First Division A	30	3	3	2	—		—		33	5
Oostende	2019–20	Belgian First Division A	15	2	1	0	—		—		16	2
Oostende	2020–21	Belgian First Division A	3	0	0	0	—		—		3	0
Oostende	Total		48	5	4	2	—		—		52	7
Shkëndija	2021–22	Macedonian First League	25	10	1	0	0	0	—		26	10
Shkëndija	2022–23	Macedonian First League	0	0	0	0	6 (Note: Appearance(s) in UEFA Europa Conference League)	2	—		6	2
Shkëndija	Total		25	10	1	0	6	2	—		32	12
İstanbulspor	2022–23	Süper Lig	12	0	2	0	—		—		14	0
Città di Varese	2023–24	Serie D	0	0	0	0	—		0	0	0	0
Career total			229	59	26	13	11	3	1	0	267	75

=== International ===
As of match played 7 September 2018

Appearances and goals by national team and year
National team	Year	Apps	Goals
Albania	2018	2	0
Total		2	0

== Honours ==
Kukësi

- Kategoria Superiore: 2016–17
- Albanian Supercup: 2016

Individual

- Kategoria Superiore Player of the Month: February 2018, April 2018
- Albanian Cup top goalscorer: 2017–18 (shared with Redon Xhixha)
