= Albanian Footballer of the Year =

Annual award given to best professional Albanian footballer

Albanian Footballer of the Year is an annual award given to the best professional Albanian footballer elected by Football Association of Albania members, coaches and captains of the Kategoria Superiore clubs. The award can also be given to a foreign player in the Kategoria Superiore, as Croatian striker Pero Pejić was nominated for the 2014 award after becoming the first foreign player to win the golden boot for the 2013–14 season.

== Winners ==
Year	Player	Club	Ref
2003	Lorik Cana	(France) Paris Saint-Germain	
2004	Fatmir Vata	(Germany) Arminia Bielefeld	
2006	Nevil Dede	(Albania) Elbasani (Albania) Tirana	
2009	Elis Bakaj	(Albania) Dinamo Tirana	
2010	Elis Bakaj	(Albania) Dinamo Tirana	
2011	Armando Vajushi	(Albania) Vllaznia Shkoder	
2012	Orges Shehi	(Albania) Skënderbeu Korçë	
2013	Daniel Xhafaj	(Albania) Teuta Durrës	
2014	Alban Hoxha	(Albania) Partizani Tirana	
2015	Sabien Lilaj	(Albania) Skënderbeu Korçë	
2016	Hamdi Salihi	(Albania) Skënderbeu Korçë	
2017	Sabien Lilaj	(Albania) Skënderbeu Korçë	
2018	Lorenc Trashi	(Albania) Partizani Tirana	
2020	Idriz Batha	(Albania) Tirana	
2022	Redon Xhixha	(Albania) Tirana	
2023	Arinaldo Rrapaj	(Albania) Partizani Tirana	
2024	Bekim Balaj	(Albania) Vllaznia Shkodër	
2025	Bekim Balaj	(Albania) Vllaznia Shkodër	

== Number of awards per player ==
Player	Number	Years
Elis Bakaj	2	2009, 2010
Sabien Lilaj	2	2015, 2017
Bekim Balaj	2	2024, 2025
Lorik Cana	1	2003
Fatmir Vata	1	2004
Nevil Dede	1	2006
Armando Vajushi	1	2011
Orges Shehi	1	2012
Daniel Xhafa	1	2013
Alban Hoxha	1	2014
Hamdi Salihi	1	2016
Lorenc Trashi	1	2018
Idriz Batha	1	2020
Redon Xhixha	1	2022
Arinaldo Rrapaj	1	2023

== See also ==
- Kategoria Superiore Player of the Month
