= List of Kategoria Superiore all-time goalscorers =

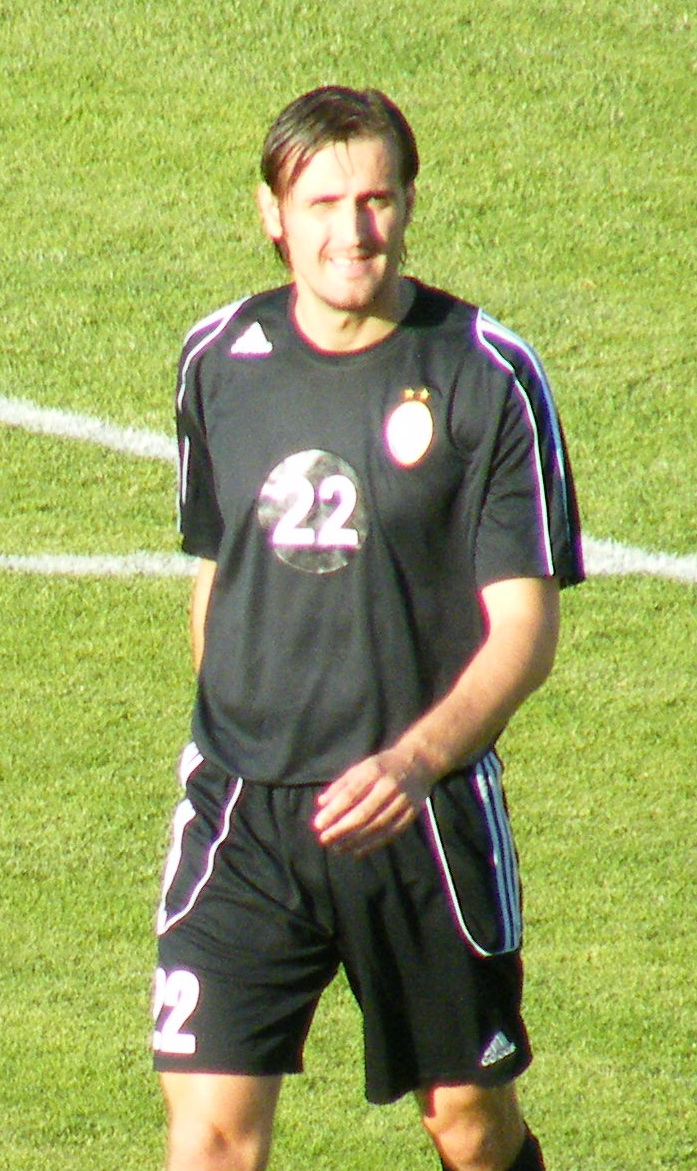
The Croatian forward Pero Pejić is the foreign player with most goals scored, having won the "Top Scorer" award three times

Below is the list of Kategoria Superiore top goalscorers since it began in 1930. The all-time top goalscorer is Vioresin Sinani, who scored 207 goals before retiring at the start of 2012–13 season. Refik Resmja is the played who has scored more goals with a single team, 180 goals with Partizani. He also holds the record for most goals in a single season at 59, and he also holds the record for most awards won, with seven.

== Top goalscorers ==
As of 29 July 2020

List of Kategoria Superiore all-time goalscorers
Rank	Player	Club(s) of Kategoria Superiore	Goals
1	(Albania) Vioresin Sinani	Vllaznia Shkodër, Tirana, Besa Kavajë	207
2	(Albania) Daniel Xhafaj	Flamurtari Vlorë, Bylis Ballsh, Dinamo Tirana, Teuta Durrës, Tirana, Besa Kavajë, Skënderbeu Korçë	204
3	(Albania) Refik Resmja	Tirana, Partizani Tirana	184
4	(Albania) Kujtim Majaci	Apolonia Fier	174
5	(Albania) Indrit Fortuzi	Dinamo Tirana, Tirana	168
6	(Albania) Panajot Pano	Tirana, Partizani Tirana	144
7	(Albania) Agustin Kola	Tirana	140
8	(Croatia) Pero Pejić	Dinamo Tirana, Tirana, Flamurtari Vlorë, Skënderbeu Korçë, Kukësi	138
9	(Albania) Arben Minga	Tirana	136
9	(Albania) Ilir Përnaska	Dinamo Tirana	136
10	(Albania) Skënder Jareci	Teuta Durrës, Dinamo Tirana	122
11	(Albania) Migen Memelli	Skënderbeu Korçë, Teuta Durrës, Elbasani, Tirana, Flamurtari Vlorë, Partizani Tirana, Laçi	115
12	(Albania) Hamdi Salihi	Vllaznia Shkodër, Tirana, Skënderbeu Korçë	114
13	(Albania) Sebino Plaku	Apolonia Fier, Dinamo Tirana, Tirana, Flamurtari Vlorë, Kastrioti Krujë, Skënderbeu Korçë, Kamza	110
14	(Albania) Gjergji Muzaka	Partizani Tirana, Tirana, Dinamo Tirana, Skënderbeu Korçë, Flamurtari Vlorë	109
15	(Albania) Medin Zhega	Vllaznia Shkodër, Tirana	101
15	(Albania) Fjodor Xhafa	Flamurtari Vlorë, Bylis Ballsh, Dinamo Tirana, Tirana, Elbasani	101
16	(Albania) Elis Bakaj	Partizani Tirana, Dinamo Tirana, Tirana, Kukësi	98
17	(Albania) Dejvi Bregu	Flamurtari, Luftëtari, Skënderbeu, KF Teuta, Dinamo City	94
18	(Albania) Vasil Ruci	Flamurtari Vlorë	93
19	(Albania) Enver Ibërshimi	Elbasani	92
20	(Albania) Xhevahir Sukaj	Vllaznia Shkodër, Elbasani, Partizani Tirana, Flamurtari Vlorë	86
21	(Albania) Bledar Mançaku	Teuta Durrës, Besa Kavajë	82
22	(Albania) Gentian Begeja	Teuta Durrës, Luftëtari Gjirokastër, Shkumbini Peqin	80
23	(Albania) Edi Martini	KF Vllaznia, Luftëtari, Apollonia	80
24	(Albania) Devi Muka	Flamurtari Vlorë, Partizani Tirana, Tirana	79
25	(Albania) Bekim Balaj	Tirana, Vllaznia Shkodër	77
26	(Albania) Dorian Bylykbashi	Elbasani, Vllaznia Shkodër, Partizani Tirana	72
27	(Albania) Emiljano Vila	Teuta, Dinamo Tirana,Partizani Tirana,Skënderbeu Korçë	68
28	(Albania) Altin Rraklli	Besa Kavajë, Tirana	66
(Italics denotes players still playing professional football; **Bold** denotes players still playing in the Kategoria Superiore)

== See also ==
- Kategoria Superiore
- List of Kategoria Superiore hat-tricks
- List of Premier League players with 100 or more goals
- List of FIFA World Cup hat-tricks
