= 2004–05 Kategoria Superiore =

Kategoria Superiore
- Season: 2004–05
- Dates: 21 August 2004 – 20 May 2005
- Champions: Tirana; 22nd Albanian title
- Relegated: Egnatia; Laçi
- Champions League: Tirana
- UEFA Cup: Elbasani; Teuta
- Intertoto Cup: Dinamo Tirana
- Matches: 180
- Goals: 510 (2.83 per match)
- Top goalscorer: Dorian Bylykbashi (24 goals)

The 2004–05 Kategoria Superiore was the 69th season of top-tier football in Albania and the seventh season under the name Kategoria Superiore.

== Teams ==
=== Stadia and last season ===
Locations of the 2004–05 Kategoria Superiore teams

Team	Location	Stadium	Capacity	Last season
Dinamo Tirana	Tirana	Qemal Stafa Stadium (Note: Dinamo Tirana, Partizani and Tirana all shared the Qemal Stafa Stadium as well as the Selman Stërmasi Stadium.)	19,700	2nd
Egnatia	Rrogozhinë	Rrogozhinë Stadium	4,000	Kategoria e Parë
Elbasani	Elbasan	Ruzhdi Bizhuta Stadium	15,000	8th
Laçi	Laçi	Laçi Stadium	11,000	Kategoria e Parë
Lushnja	Lushnjë	Abdurrahman Roza Haxhiu Stadium	12,000	6th
Partizani	Tirana	Qemal Stafa Stadium	19,700	4th
Shkumbini	Peqin	Shkumbini Stadium	6,000	7th
Teuta	Durrës	Niko Dovana Stadium	12,040	5th
Tirana	Tirana	Qemal Stafa Stadium	19,700	Champions
Vllaznia	Shkodër	Loro Boriçi Stadium	15,000	3rd

== League table ==
Pos	Team	Pld	W	D	L	GF	GA	GD	Pts	Qualification or relegation
1	Tirana (C)	36	26	6	4	82	32	+50	84	Qualification for the Champions League first qualifying round
2	Elbasani	36	24	7	5	59	27	+32	79	Qualification for the UEFA Cup first qualifying round
3	Dinamo Tirana	36	18	8	10	51	30	+21	62	Qualification for the Intertoto Cup first round
4	Vllaznia	36	19	4	13	80	47	+33	61	
5	Teuta	36	16	4	16	47	49	−2	52	Qualification for the UEFA Cup first qualifying round (Note: Teuta qualified for the UEFA Cup first qualifying round by winning the 2004–05 Albanian Cup.)
6	Shkumbini	36	14	6	16	49	47	+2	48	
7	Lushnja	36	13	9	14	43	47	−4	48	
8	Partizani	36	13	7	16	59	58	+1	46	
9	Egnatia (R)	36	7	7	22	26	48	−22	28	Relegation to the 2005–06 Kategoria e Parë
10	Laçi (R)	36	0	2	34	13	124	−111	2	Relegation to the 2005–06 Kategoria e Parë

Source: Albanian Football Association (in Albanian), RSSSF.org
Rules for classification: 1) points; 2) points in head-to-head matches; 3) goal difference in head-to-head matches; 4) goals scored in head-to-head matches; 5) total goal difference; 6) total goals scored; 7) draw
(C) Champions; (R) Relegated

== Results ==
Each team plays every opponent four times, twice at home and twice away, for a total of 36 games.

=== First half of season ===
Home \ Away	DIN	EGN	ELB	LAÇ	LUS	PAR	SKU	TEU	TIR	VLL
Dinamo		1–0	0–0	6–1	1–1	3–2	3–2	0–1	2–1	0–1
Egnatia	2–1		0–1	1–0	0–2	1–0	0–2	1–2	0–2	1–0
Elbasani	0–0	1–0		2–0	2–0	2–1	2–1	2–0	3–1	1–0
Laçi	0–3	0–2	0–1		0–1	0–4	1–3	0–1	0–3	1–2
Lushnja	0–2	2–1	0–1	1–1		1–0	3–1	1–1	0–3	2–0
Partizani	0–1	2–1	2–2	4–1	3–0		1–1	2–1	2–5	2–0 (Note: Match awarded.)
Shkumbini	2–1	1–1	1–2	5–1	2–0	2–0		1–0	1–2	3–5
Teuta	1–0	1–0	1–0	6–1	1–1	0–1	1–2		0–2	3–2
Tirana	3–1	3–1	2–2	1–0	3–0	3–3	1–0	2–0		2–1
Vllaznia	0–2	3–2	4–1	7–0	2–0	3–1	2–0	6–1	1–2	

Source: Albanian Football Association
Legend: Blue = home team win; Yellow = draw; Red = away team win.

=== Second half of season ===
Home \ Away	DIN	EGN	ELB	LAÇ	LUS	PAR	SKU	TEU	TIR	VLL
Dinamo		3–1	0–0	4–0	1–0	2–0	2–1	0–2	0–1	1–0
Egnatia	0–0		0–1	2–0	0–0	0–0	0–0	0–2 (Note: Match awarded.)	0–1	1–1
Elbasani	1–1	2–1		7–0	3–1	2–1	4–2	3–0	2–2	1–0
Laçi	0–1	0–3	0–1		0–3	0–5	0–2	0–1	0–5	1–7
Lushnja	2–2	3–1	3–2	5–0		1–3	1–0	1–0	1–3	2–0
Partizani	0–2	4–1	0–2	5–5	1–1		1–0	1–0	0–1	1–1
Shkumbini	1–0	1–1	1–0	1–0	0–0	4–3		3–1	0–1	0–1
Teuta	2–2	1–0	0–1	5–0	2–1	1–2	1–0		3–5	3–2
Tirana	0–2	3–1	0–1	6–0	1–1	4–0	2–0	2–2		2–2
Vllaznia	2–1	2–0	2–1	8–0	4–2	4–2	3–3	2–0	0–2	

Source: Albanian Football Association
Legend: Blue = home team win; Yellow = draw; Red = away team win.

== Season statistics ==
=== Top goalscorers ===
As of matches played 20 May 2005.

Rank	Player	Club	Goals
1	(Albania) Dorian Bylykbashi	Partizani	24
2	(Albania) Daniel Xhafa	Teuta	21
3	(Brazil) Abílio	Vllaznia	20
4	(Albania) Altin Rraklli	Tirana	19
5	(Albania) Hamdi Salihi	Vllaznia	16
6	(Albania) Skerdi Bejzade	Elbasani	15
6	(Albania) Vioresin Sinani	Vllaznia	15
8	(Albania) Devi Muka	Tirana	14
9	(Albania) Indrit Fortuzi	Tirana	12
10	(Albania) Klodian Arbëri	Lushnja	11
10	(Albania) Gentian Begeja	Shkumbini	11

=== Hat-tricks ===
Player	Nationality	For	Against	Result	Date	Ref
Abílio	Brazil	Vllaznia	Shkumbini	3–5	15 October 2004	
Hamdi Salihi	Albania	Vllaznia	Laçi	7–0	22 October 2004	
Kreshnik Ivanaj	Albania	Shkumbini	Laçi	5–1	12 November 2004	
Hamdi Salihi	Albania	Vllaznia	Laçi	1–7	17 December 2004	
Skerdi Bejzade	Albania	Elbasani	Laçi	7–0	14 January 2005	
Vioresin Sinani	Albania	Vllaznia	Laçi	8–0	4 March 2005	
Daniel Xhafa	Albania	Teuta	Laçi	5–0	23 April 2005	
Daniel Xhafa	Albania	Teuta	Tirana	3–5	6 May 2005	
Altin Rraklli	Albania	Tirana	Teuta	3–5	6 May 2005	
Dorian Bylykbashi	Albania	Partizani	Shkumbini	4–3	14 May 2005	
Dorian Bylykbashi^{5}	Albania	Partizani	Laçi	5–5	20 May 2005	
