= Isli Hidi =

Albanian footballer

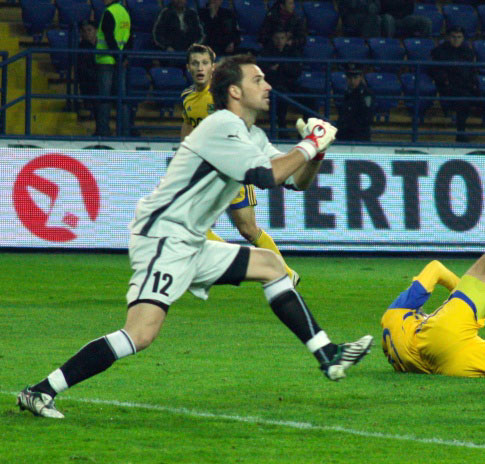
- Hidi with Kryvbas Kryvyi Rih in 2009

Personal information
- Date of birth: 15 October 1980 (age 46)
- Place of birth: Tirana, Albania
- Height: 1.90 m (6 ft 3 in)
- Position: Goalkeeper

Youth career
- –1998: Tirana

Senior career*
Years	Team	Apps	(Gls)
1998–2007	Tirana	117	(0)
2001–2002	→ Bylis (loan)	24	(0)
2007–2008	Kryvbas Kryvyi Rih	18	(0)
2008–2009	Alki	12	(0)
2009–2010	Kryvbas Kryvyi Rih	21	(0)
2010	Dinamo Tirana	8	(0)
2011	Olympiakos Nicosia	10	(0)
2011–2013	AEL Limassol	6	(0)
2013–2016	Apollon Limassol	0	(0)
2016	Nea Salamina	0	(0)
2016–2018	Olympiakos Nicosia	30	(0)
2018–2019	Teuta	33	(0)
2019–2020	Bylis	33	(7)
2020–2021	Kastrioti	36	(0)
2021–2022	Erzeni	29	(3)
2022–2023	Vora	7	(0)
Total		377	(10)

International career
2005–2011	Albania	17	(0)
- * Club domestic league appearances and goals

Isli Hidi (born 15 October 1980) is a former Albanian professional footballer who played as a goalkeeper.

He started his career with KF Tirana, where he won six Kategoria Superiore winners medals, three Kupa e Shqipërisë winners medals and six Superkupa e Shqipërisë winners medals. In Albania he has also played for KF Bylis, Dinamo Tirana, KF Teuta and KS Kastrioti. He also played in Ukraine for Kryvbas Kryvyi Rih and in Cyprus for Alki Larnaca, Olympiakos Nicosia, AEL Limassol, Apollon Limassol and Nea Salamina. During his time in Cyprus he won one Cypriot First Division winners medal with AEL Limassol and one Cypriot Cup with Apollon Limassol.

== Club career ==
Hidi started off his career at his hometown club, Tirana in 1998. After very few appearances, he was loaned out to Bylis. After making a huge impact, he returned to Tirana to compete for the number 1 shirt. He signed for the Ukrainian club Kryvbas Kryvyi Rih in August 2007. In 2008, Hidi moved to Alki Larnaca for the remainder of the 2008–09 season. Hidi rejoined Kryvbas Kryvyi Rih on a three-year contract for around one million dollars per season on 3 March 2009.

On 6 July 2010, he signed for Dinamo Tirana for the 2010–11 season. On 7 January 2011, Hidi joined Cyprus's Olympiakos Nicosia by inking a contract until the end of the season.

In July 2018, Hidi joined Teuta on a one-year contract, returning to Kategoria Superiore after eight years. In November, he was named league's player of the month after some strong performances. He concluded the 2018–19 season by making 33 league appearances, missing only one match, the one against Tirana in April 2019.

In August 2019, Hidi completed a transfer to Bylis, returning in Ballsh for the first time since 2002 when he was on loan. He took squad number 1 for the 2019–20 season. Hidi made his debut on 24 August in the 1–0 away defeat to his former side Teuta. On 1 September, in his third appearance of the season, Hidi scored his first career goal, a penalty in the 3–0 win at Skënderbeu, guiding the team to their first seasonal win. On 15 September, in the first match following the international break, Hidi scored another penalty, this time at home against Kukësi, aiding Byis to achieve a 2–1 comeback win which lifted them in 4th place in championship. His first goal in Albanian Cup came on 12 February 2020 in the second leg of competition's second round against Laçi, helping Bylis advance to quarter-finals 4–3 on aggregate.

On 14 May 2023, Hidi announced his retirement from football a few days after winning the Kategoria e Dytë title with Vora. He played seven matches as captain in his last season.

== International career ==
Hidi received his first senior international call-up in May 2005 for the friendly match versus Poland by German coach Hans-Peter Briegel who was impressed by Hidi's performances in Kategoria Superiore with his club at the time Tirana. He earned his first cap in that match, but things could not have started any worse for him as Poland scored in under two minutes with Maciej Żurawski. Hidi's second appearance for Albania came later that year, on 17 August against Azerbaijan at Qemal Stafa Stadium; he started again and conceded another early goal, but this time the team bounced back and won 2–1 in front of around 7,300 Albanian fans.

== Personal life ==
In 2017, Hidi begun the application for Cypriot passport.

== Career statistics ==
=== Club ===
As of 12 February 2020

Appearances and goals by club, season and competition
Club	Season	League			Cup		Europe		Other		Total	
Club	Season	Division	Apps	Goals	Apps	Goals	Apps	Goals	Apps	Goals	Apps	Goals
Tirana	1998–99	Kategoria Superiore	4	0	0	0	0	0	—		4	0
Tirana	1999–2000	Kategoria Superiore	1	0	0	0	0	0	—		1	0
Tirana	2000–01	Kategoria Superiore	2	0	0	0	1 (Note: Appearance(s) in UEFA Champions League)	0	—		3	0
Tirana	2001–02	Kategoria Superiore	0	0	0	0	0	0	1 (Note: Appearance(s) in Albanian Supercup)	0	1	0
Tirana	2002–03	Kategoria Superiore	21	0	0	0	0	0	1	0	22	0
Tirana	2003–04	Kategoria Superiore	20	0	0	0	0	0	1	0	21	0
Tirana	2004–05	Kategoria Superiore	28	0	0	0	4	0	1	0	33	0
Tirana	2005–06	Kategoria Superiore	20	0	0	0	4	0	1	0	25	0
Tirana	2006–07	Kategoria Superiore	21	0	0	0	3 (Note: Appearance(s) in UEFA Cup)	0	—		24	0
Tirana	2007–08	Kategoria Superiore	0	0	0	0	2	0	1	0	3	0
Tirana	Total		117	0	0	0	14	0	6	0	137	0
Bylis (loan)	2001–02	Kategoria Superiore	24	0	0	0	—		—		24	0
Kryvbas Kryvyi Rih	2007–08	Ukrainian Premier League	18	0	0	0	—		—		18	0
Alki Larnaca	2008–09	Cypriot First Division	12	0	0	0	—		—		12	0
Kryvbas Kryvyi Rih]	2008–09	Ukrainian Premier League	12	0	0	0	0	0	—		12	0
Kryvbas Kryvyi Rih]	2009–10	Ukrainian Premier League	9	0	0	0	0	0	—		9	0
Kryvbas Kryvyi Rih]	Total		21	0	0	0	—		—		21	0
Dinamo Tirana	2010–11	Kategoria Superiore	8	0	2	0	2	0	1	0	13	0
Olympiakos Nicosia	2010–11	Cypriot First Division	7	0	0	0	—		—		7	0
AEL Limassol	2011–12	Cypriot First Division	1	0	0	0	—		—		1	0
AEL Limassol	2012–13	Cypriot First Division	6	0	1	0	0	0	—		7	0
AEL Limassol	Total		7	0	1	0	0	0	—		8	0
Apollon Limassol	2013–14	Cypriot First Division	0	0	0	0	2 (Note: Appearance(s) in UEFA Europa League)	0	—		2	0
Apollon Limassol	2014–15	Cypriot First Division	1	0	0	0	1	0	—		2	0
Apollon Limassol	2015–16	Cypriot First Division	0	0	0	0	0	0	—		0	0
Apollon Limassol	Total		1	0	0	0	3	0	—		4	0
Olympiakos Nicosia	2016–17	Cypriot Second Division	25	0	0	0	—		—		25	0
Olympiakos Nicosia	2017–18	Cypriot First Division	30	0	1	0	—		—		31	0
Olympiakos Nicosia	Total		55	0	1	0	—		—		56	0
Teuta	2018–19	Kategoria Superiore	33	0	2	0	—		—		35	0
Teuta	2019–20	Kategoria Superiore	0	0	0	0	2	0	—		2	0
Teuta	Total		33	0	2	0	2	0	—		37	0
Bylis	2019–20	Kategoria Superiore	20	4	2	1	—		—		22	5
Career total			320	4	8	1	21	0	7	0	356	5

=== International ===
As of 15 November 2011

Appearances and goals by national team and year
National team	Year	Apps	Goals
Albania	2005	2	0
Albania	2006	1	0
Albania	2007	1	0
Albania	2008	2	0
Albania	2009	5	0
Albania	2010	3	0
Albania	2011	3	0
Total		17	0

== Honours ==
Tirana

- Kategoria Superiore: 1998–99, 1999–00, 2002–03, 2003–04, 2004–05, 2006–07
- Kupa e Shqipërisë: 1998–99, 2000–01, 2005–06
- Superkupa e Shqipërisë: 2000, 2002, 2003, 2005, 2006, 2007

AEL Limassol

- Cypriot First Division: 2011–12

Apollon Limassol

- Cypriot Cup: 2015–16

Individual

- Kategoria Superiore Player of the Month: November 2018
