= 2003–04 Kategoria e Parë =

Kategoria e Parë
- Season: 2003–04
- Champions: Laçi
- Promoted: Laçi; Egnatia
- Relegated: Veleçiku
- Matches: 122
- Goals: 335 (2.75 per match)

The 2003–04 Kategoria e Parë was the 57th season of a second-tier association football league in Albania.

== First stage ==
Pos	Team	Pld	W	D	L	GF	GA	GD	Pts	Qualification
1	Egnatia	18	10	6	2	30	15	+15	36	Qualification to the Promotion group
2	Bylis	18	11	2	5	41	21	+20	35	Qualification to the Promotion group
3	Laçi	18	9	6	3	24	15	+9	33	Qualification to the Promotion group
4	Tomori	18	8	6	4	23	16	+7	30	Qualification to the Promotion group
5	Naftëtari	18	7	6	5	28	22	+6	27	Qualification to the Promotion group
6	Besëlidhja	18	7	4	7	26	24	+2	25	Qualification to the Classification group
7	Apolonia	18	5	5	8	15	23	−8	20	Qualification to the Classification group
8	Erzeni	18	6	2	10	19	28	−9	20	Qualification to the Classification group
9	Luftëtari	18	4	6	8	27	30	−3	18	Qualification to the Classification group
10	Veleçiku (R)	18	1	1	16	13	52	−39	4	Withdrew

(R) Relegated

== Second stage ==
=== Championship/promotion group ===
Pos	Team	Pld	W	D	L	GF	GA	GD	Pts	Promotion
1	Laçi (C, P)	26	15	7	4	44	21	+23	52 (Note: Laçi and Egnatia finished the season level on points so the Albanian Football Association decided to organise a championship playoff game to determine the winner of the 2003–04 Kategoria e Parë.)	Promotion to 2004–05 Kategoria Superiore
2	Egnatia (P)	26	15	7	4	40	20	+20	52	Promotion to 2004–05 Kategoria Superiore
3	Tomori	26	13	7	6	39	26	+13	46	
4	Bylis	26	11	3	12	48	45	+3	36	
5	Naftëtari	26	8	8	10	37	39	−2	32	

(C) Champions; (P) Promoted

=== Classification group ===
- Veleçiku was withdrew before 19th round
- The group was originally called a relegation group, but was named as Classification group since the ninth team Apolonia were spared from the relegation as the 2nd level is extended to 12 clubs from the next season.

Pos	Team	Pld	W	D	L	GF	GA	GD	Pts
6	Besëlidhja	24	11	4	9	36	33	+3	37
7	Erzeni	24	9	4	11	26	31	−5	31
8	Luftëtari	24	6	7	11	33	37	−4	25
9	Apolonia	24	6	6	12	19	31	−12	24

== Championship playoff ==
20 May 2004

Egnatia	0–1	Laçi
		Rexha 80'

Niko Dovana Stadium, Durrës
Referee: Kridens Meta
