= Kategoria Superiore Player of the Month =

Albanian football award

- Sport: Football
- League: Kategoria Superiore
- Local name: Lojtari i Muajit i Kategorisë Superiore
- Sponsored by: Sporti Na Bashkon
- Country: Albania

History
- First award: 2010; 15 years ago
- Final award: 2019; 7 years ago
- First winner: Hair Zeqiri
- Most wins: 8 players

The Kategoria Superiore Player of the Month (Albanian: Lojtari i Muajit i Kategorisë Superiore) is an association football award that recognises the best Kategoria Superiore player each month of the season. It is presented by association "Sporti Na Bashkon". This award was established in the 2010–11 season.

== Winners ==
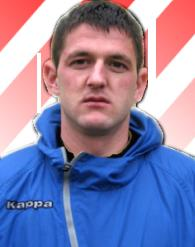
Stevan Račić, become the third foreign player to win Player of the Month award in September 2014

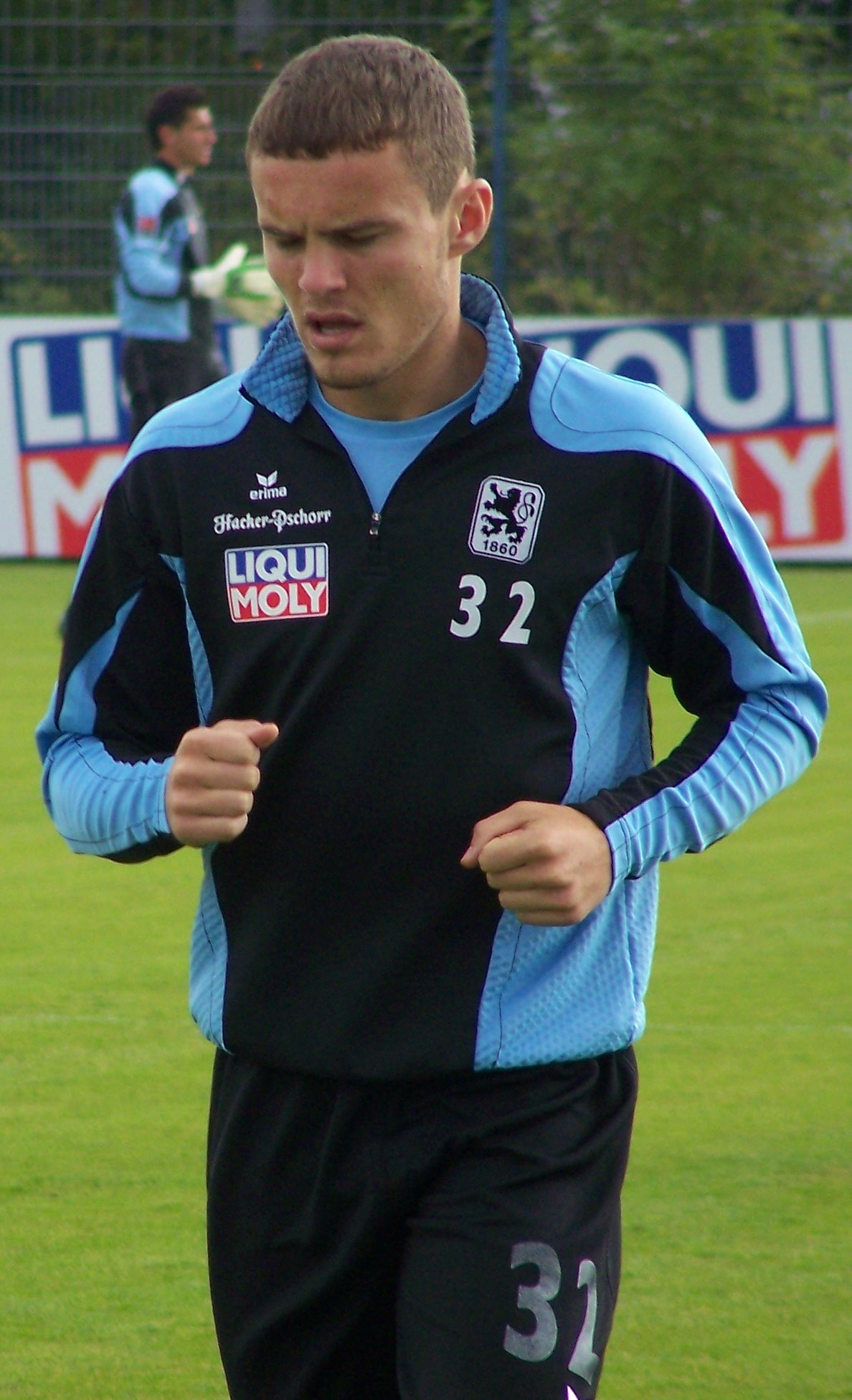
Kushtrim Lushtaku became the first Kosovar player to win the award in November 2014

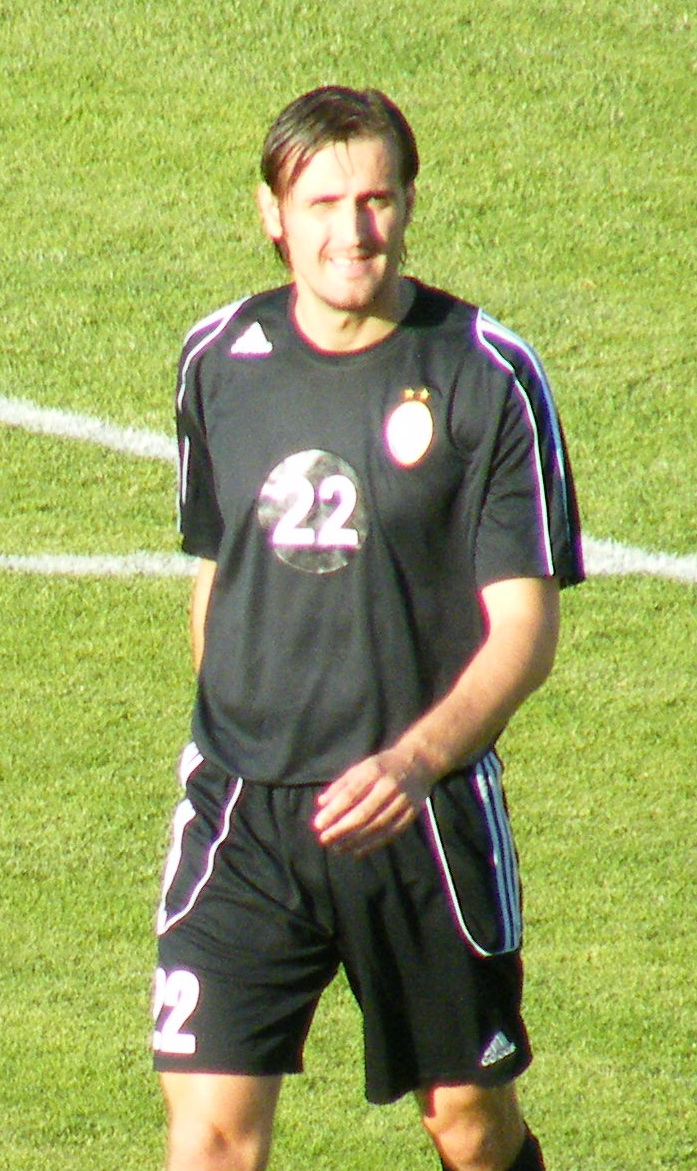
Pero Pejić was the second Skënderbeu Korçë player to win the award in September 2012

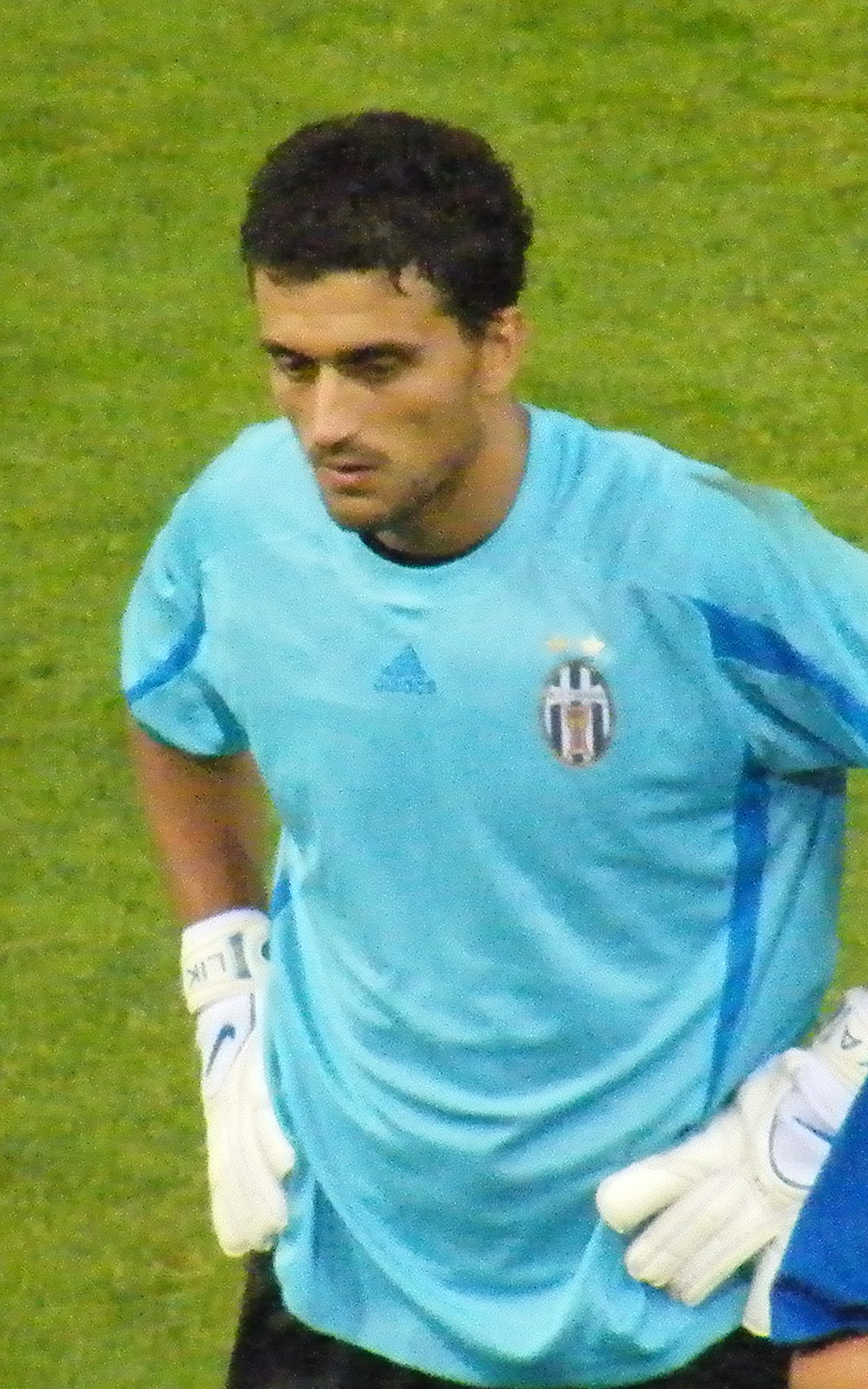
Ilion Lika become the only second goalkeeper to win the award in April 2014

Month	Year (Note: Each year is linked to an article on the particular season associated with the month of that year.)	Nationality	Player	Team	Position	Ref
September	2010	Albania	Hair Zeqiri	Flamurtari Vlorë	MF	
October	2010	Albania	Erjon Mustafaj	Shkumbini Peqin	FW	
November	2010	Albania	Franc Veliu	Flamurtari Vlorë	DF	
September	2011	Albania	Gilman Lika	Tirana	MF	
February	2012	Albania	Armando Vajushi	Vllaznia Shkodër	MF	
April	2012	Croatia	Marko Radaš	Skënderbeu Korçë	DF	
September	2012	Croatia	Pero Pejić	Skënderbeu Korçë	FW	
October	2012	Albania	Sabien Lilaj	Skënderbeu Korçë	MF	
November	2012	Albania	Gerhard Progni	Kukësi	MF	
February	2013	Albania	Migen Memelli	Flamurtari Vlorë	FW	
March	2013	Albania	Gjergji Muzaka	Flamurtari Vlorë	MF	
April	2013	Albania	Gilman Lika	Tirana	MF	
September	2013	Albania	Daniel Xhafaj	Teuta Durrës	FW	
October	2013	Albania	Bledjan Rizvani	Teuta Durrës	GK	
November	2013	Albania	Hair Zeqiri	Flamurtari Vlorë	MF	
December	2013	Albania	Bledi Shkëmbi	Skënderbeu Korçë	MF	
February	2014	Albania	Gentian Muça	Tirana	DF	
March	2014	Albania	Sokol Cikalleshi	Kukësi	FW	
April	2014	Albania	Ilion Lika	Tirana	GK	
September	2014	Serbia	Stevan Račić	Partizani Tirana	FW	
October	2014	Albania	Elis Bakaj	Tirana	MF	
November	2014	Kosovo	Kushtrim Lushtaku	Kukësi	MF	
January	2015	Albania	Erando Karabeci	Tirana	MF	
March	2015	Albania	Alban Hoxha	Partizani Tirana	GK	
September	2015	Kosovo	Bernard Berisha	Skënderbeu Korçë	MF	
October	2015	Albania	Xhevahir Sukaj	Partizani Tirana	FW	
January	2016	Albania	Elis Bakaj	Tirana	MF	
February	2016	Albania	Arbnor Fejzullahu	Partizani Tirana	DF	
April	2016	Nigeria	Sodiq Atanda	Partizani Tirana	DF	
September	2016	Croatia	Pero Pejić	Kukësi	FW	
October	2016	Albania	Lorenc Trashi	Partizani Tirana	MF	
November	2016	Albania	Afrim Taku	Tirana	MF	
December	2016	Ghana	Caleb Ekuban	Partizani Tirana	FW	
February	2017	Albania	Enea Koliçi	Kukësi	GK	
March	2017	Albania	Liridon Latifi	Skënderbeu Korçë	MF	
September	2017	Albania	Sabien Lilaj	Skënderbeu Korçë	MF	
October	2017	Gambia	Ali Sowe	Skënderbeu Korçë	FW	
November	2017	Albania	Sebino Plaku	Kamza	FW	
December	2017	Albania	Kristal Abazaj	Luftëtari Gjirokastër	FW	
February	2018	Albania	Sindrit Guri	Kukësi	FW	
March	2018	Kosovo	Esat Mala	Partizani Tirana	MF	
April	2018	Albania	Sindrit Guri	Kukësi	FW	
September	2018	Mozambique	Reginaldo	Kukësi	FW	
October	2018	Albania	Gjergji Muzaka	Skënderbeu Korçë	MF	
November	2018	Albania	Isli Hidi	Teuta Durrës	GK	
December	2018	Albania	Sherif Kallaku	Teuta Durrës	MF	
February	2019	Albania	Bruno Telushi	Partizani Tirana	MF	
March	2019	Albania	Jasir Asani	Partizani Tirana	FW	
April	2019	Albania	Enea Koliçi	Flamurtari Vlorë	GK	

== Multiple winners ==
The below table lists those who have won on more than one occasion.

*	Indicates current Kategoria Superiore player
**Bold**	Indicates players still playing professional football

Rank	Player	Wins
1st	Elis Bakaj	2
1st	**Sindrit Guri**	2
1st	**Enea Koliçi**	2
1st	Gilman Lika	2
1st	Sabien Lilaj	2
1st	Gjergji Muzaka	2
1st	Pero Pejić	2
1st	Hair Zeqiri	2

== Awards won by ==
By position

Position	Wins
Midfielder	22
Forward	16
Goalkeeper	6
Defender	5

By nationality

Country	Wins
Albania	38
Croatia	3
Kosovo	3
Gambia	1
Ghana	1
Mozambique	1
Nigeria	1
Serbia	1

By club

Club	Wins
Partizani Tirana	9
Skënderbeu Korçë	9
Kukësi	8
Tirana	8
Flamurtari Vlorë	6
Teuta Durrës	4
Kamza	1
Luftëtari Gjirokastër	1
Shkumbini Peqin	1
Vllaznia Shkodër	1

== See also ==
- List of Kategoria Superiore all-time goalscorers
- List of Kategoria Superiore hat-tricks
