= Carioca (footballer, born 1974) =

Brazilian footballer

Personal information
- Full name: Alexander Antonio Viana
- Date of birth: 24 April 1974 (age 52)
- Place of birth: Brazil
- Position: Forward

Senior career*
Years	Team	Apps	(Gls)
2001–2005	Partizani	?	(21)
- * Club domestic league appearances and goals

Alexander Antonio Viana (born 24 April 1974), commonly known as Carioca, is a retired Brazilian footballer who played for Partizani Tirana in the Albanian Superliga between 2001 and 2005. He became the first foreign player in the Albanian Superliga to score a hattrick and is currently one of two foreign players to have scored multiple hattricks in the league, alongside Croatian striker Pero Pejić.
