= Redon Xhixha =

Albanian footballer (born 1998)

Personal information
- Date of birth: 14 July 1998 (age 28)
- Place of birth: Laç, Albania
- Height: 1.81 m (5 ft 11 in)
- Position: Striker

Team information
- Current team: Tirana
- Number: 19

Youth career
- 2016–2017: Shkëndija Tiranë

Senior career*
Years	Team	Apps	(Gls)
2017–2021	Laçi	129	(26)
2021–2023	Tirana	46	(25)
2023–2025	Qarabağ	51	(7)
2025–2026	CR Belouizdad	5	(0)
2026–	Tirana	23	(10)

International career^{‡}
2019–2020	Albania U21	10	(0)
2022	Albania	2	(0)
- * Club domestic league appearances and goals as of 24 June 2026 ‡ National team caps and goals as of 21 January 2023

Redon Xhixha (born 14 July 1998) is an Albanian professional footballer who plays as a striker for Kategoria Superiore club Tirana and the Albania national team.

== Club career ==
=== Laçi ===
On 20 July 2017, Xhixha signed his first professional contract and joined Kategoria Superiore side Laçi. He was an unused substitute in the opening matchday away against Partizani on 10 September, in which Laçi caused an upset by winning 2–0. Just three days later, Xhixha made his Albanian Cup debut in the first leg of the first round, where he bagged 5 goals in a 12–0 hammering of Sopoti. He dedicated the goals to his family.

He made his Kategoria Superiore debut on 24 September, in matchday 2 against Kukësi, which finished in a 3–0 away loss. He netted his first league goals one week later in a 2–0 home win over Vllaznia.

He left the club at the end of the 2020–21 campaign after his contract expired.

=== Qarabağ ===
On 24 January 2023, Azerbaijan Premier League club Qarabağ announced the signing of Xhixha on a contract until 30 June 2026.

=== CR Belouizdad ===
On 12 July 2025, he joined Algerian club CR Belouizdad.

=== Tirana ===
On 7 January 2026, Xhixha returned to Tirana.

== Personal life ==
His favourite players are Hamdi Salihi and Robert Lewandowski.

== Career statistics ==
=== Club ===
As of 30 September 2017

Appearances and goals by club, season and competition
Club	Season	League			Cup		Europe		Total	
Club	Season	Division	Apps	Goals	Apps	Goals	Apps	Goals	Apps	Goals
Laçi	2017–18	Kategoria Superiore	2	2	1	5	—		3	7
Career total			2	2	1	5	—		3	7

== Honours ==
Tirana

- Kategoria Superiore: 2021–22
- Albanian Supercup: 2022

Qarabağ

- Azerbaijan Premier League: 2022–23

Individual

- Albanian Footballer of the Year: 2022
