= Hamdi Salihi =

Albanian footballer (born 1984)

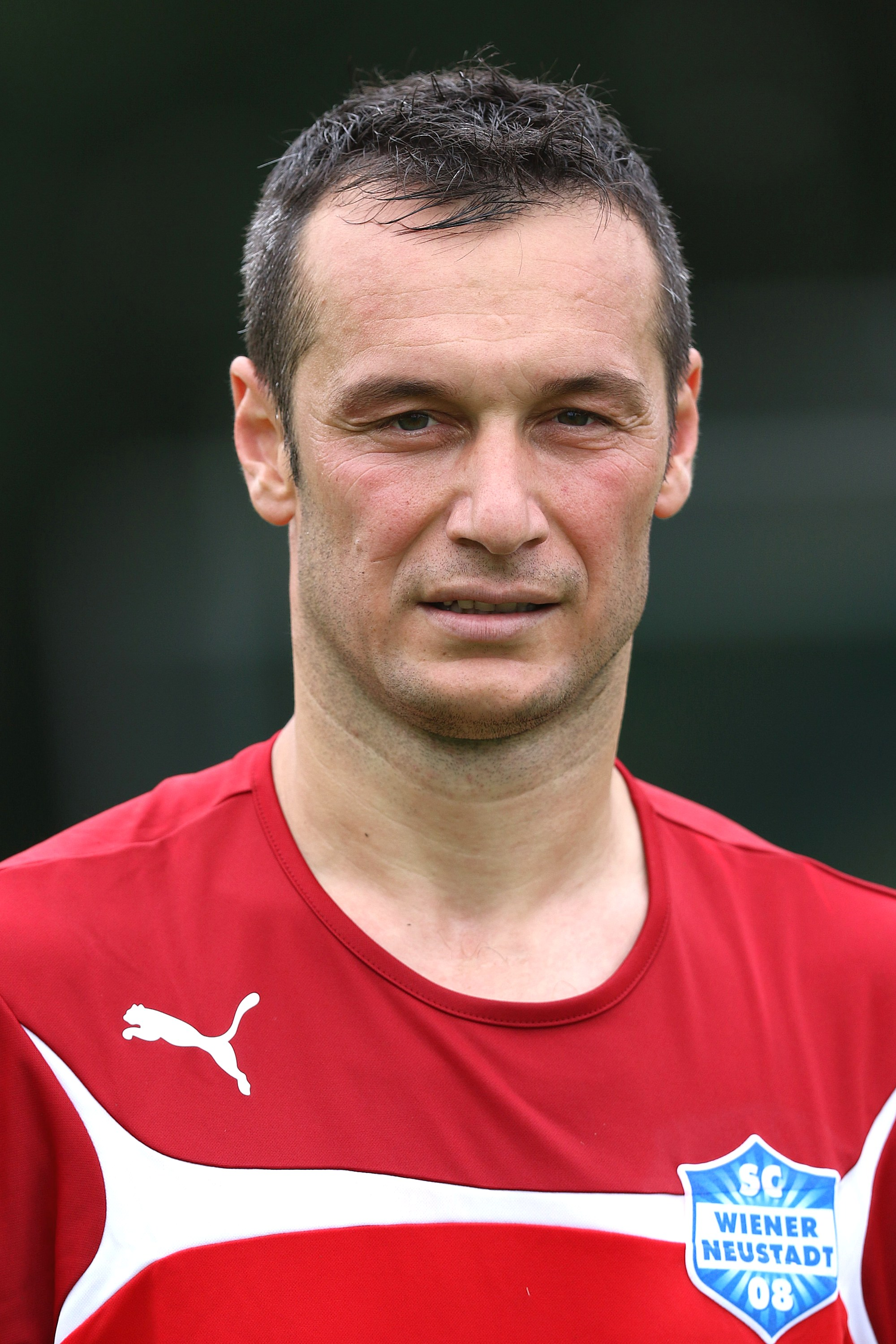
- Salihi with Wiener Neustadt in 2017

Personal information
- Full name: Hamdi Abdullah Salihi
- Date of birth: 19 January 1984 (age 42)
- Place of birth: Shkodër, PSR Albania
- Height: 1.85 m (6 ft 1 in)
- Position: Forward

Team information
- Current team: Albania (assistant)

Youth career
- 2000–2002: Vllaznia Shkodër

Senior career*
Years	Team	Apps	(Gls)
2002–2004	Vllaznia	55	(30)
2004–2005	Panionios	6	(0)
2005–2007	Tirana	52	(42)
2007–2009	Ried	82	(34)
2009–2012	Rapid Wien	67	(36)
2012–2013	D.C. United	23	(6)
2013–2014	Jiangsu Sainty	28	(9)
2014–2015	Hapoel Acre	33	(14)
2015	Hapoel Haifa	10	(4)
2015–2017	Skënderbeu	63	(42)
2017–2019	Wiener Neustadt	49	(27)
Total		468	(244)

International career
2002–2003	Albania U19	2	(0)
2003–2005	Albania U21	12	(1)
2006–2015	Albania	50	(11)

Managerial career
- 2019: Wiener Neustadt (assistant)
- 2019–2023: Albania (assistant)
- * Club domestic league appearances and goals

Hamdi Abdullah Salihi (born 19 January 1984) is an Albanian retired professional footballer who played as a forward. Nicknamed 'The Bomber' by his former international coach Otto Barić who would compare him to Gerd Müller, Salihi is known for being a prolific goalscorer both in Albania and Austria, the two countries where he has spent the majority of his career. He earned 50 international caps for Albania and was a regular starter from 2009 to 2013.

== Club career ==
=== Early years ===
Salihi begun his professional career at his boyhood club Vllaznia Shkodër, where he was promoted in the first team by coach Artan Bushati in the 2002–03 season; he made two appearances as the team finished runner-up to eventual champions Tirana. He had his breakthrough season in the 2003–04 season, netting his first Albanian Superliga goal in the opening week, a 4–1 away loss to Partizani Tirana. In cup, he notably scored four goals in a 9–0 away win versus Ada Velipojë in the second leg of second round. Salihi finished his first full-season by netting 14 goals in 33 league appearances, with Vllaznia finishing third.

Salihi scored his first top-flight hat-trick on 23 October 2004 in Vllaznia's 7–0 hammering of Laçi. He was the most in-from striker during the first part of 2004–05 season in which he managed to score 16 goals in only 20 matches which ensured him a transfer to Greece.

In January 2005, Salihi moved for the first time outside the country by joining Panionios in then Alpha Ethniki on a three-year contract. The young Albanian striker managed to play in 6 games, mostly coming on as a substitute in the last few minutes. He left the club following the end of the season and came back to Albania. Many years later he stated that the transfer was a mistake, adding that he was not ready to leave the country at such young age.

=== Tirana ===
Salihi moved back to Albania and played for Tirana starting from the 2005–06 season. In his first match since returning in Albania, Salihi scored as Tirana started the Albanian Superliga with a 2–1 away win at Vllaznia Shkodër. Later on 16 September in the match day 4 against city rivals Dinamo, Salihi scored a brace, including a last-minute winner, to rescue his side a point. His was followed by another brace one week later against Skënderbeu Korçë. He had a very successful season winning the Albanian Cup and the Golden Boot as the highest scorer of the Albanian Superliga.

He continued with Tirana for another half season, again being the highest scorer in the league before he left to purchase a career outside Albania. During his time at Tirana, Salihi became well-known all over the world for his goalscoring abilities. He finished eighth in The IFFHS World's best Top Division Goal Scorer 2006. Salihi later would go on to say that the transfer to Tirana was the best choice of his career, adding that at Tirana he matured as a player and person.

=== SV Ried ===
In January 2007, Salihi completed a transfer to SV Ried of the Austrian Bundesliga. In the remaining part of 2006–07, Salihi scored 6 goals in 15 league appearances as Ried finished runner-up in championship. By finishing second in the league, Ried won the right to play European football. On 19 July 2007, in the first leg of 2007–08 UEFA Cup first qualifying round, Salihi netted in the last minute of regular time as Ried won 3–1 against Neftchi Baku. He also scored his team's only goal in the returning leg as Ried was defeated 1–2 but progressed 4–3 on aggregate.

In the 2007–08 season, Salihi enjoyed a decent season at the club, becoming the league's joint fourth top scorer along with Carsten Jancker of SV Mattersburg with 12 league goals. Despite this, SV Ried only finished seventh out of 10 in the league. In the 2008–09 season Salihi improved himself to 14 league goals at Ried, scoring one fourth of his team's goals. Ried placed fifth at the end of the season. On the 2009–10 season Salihi played 6 games which he score twist for his club but couple weeks later he was sold to Rapid Wien.

=== Rapid Wien ===
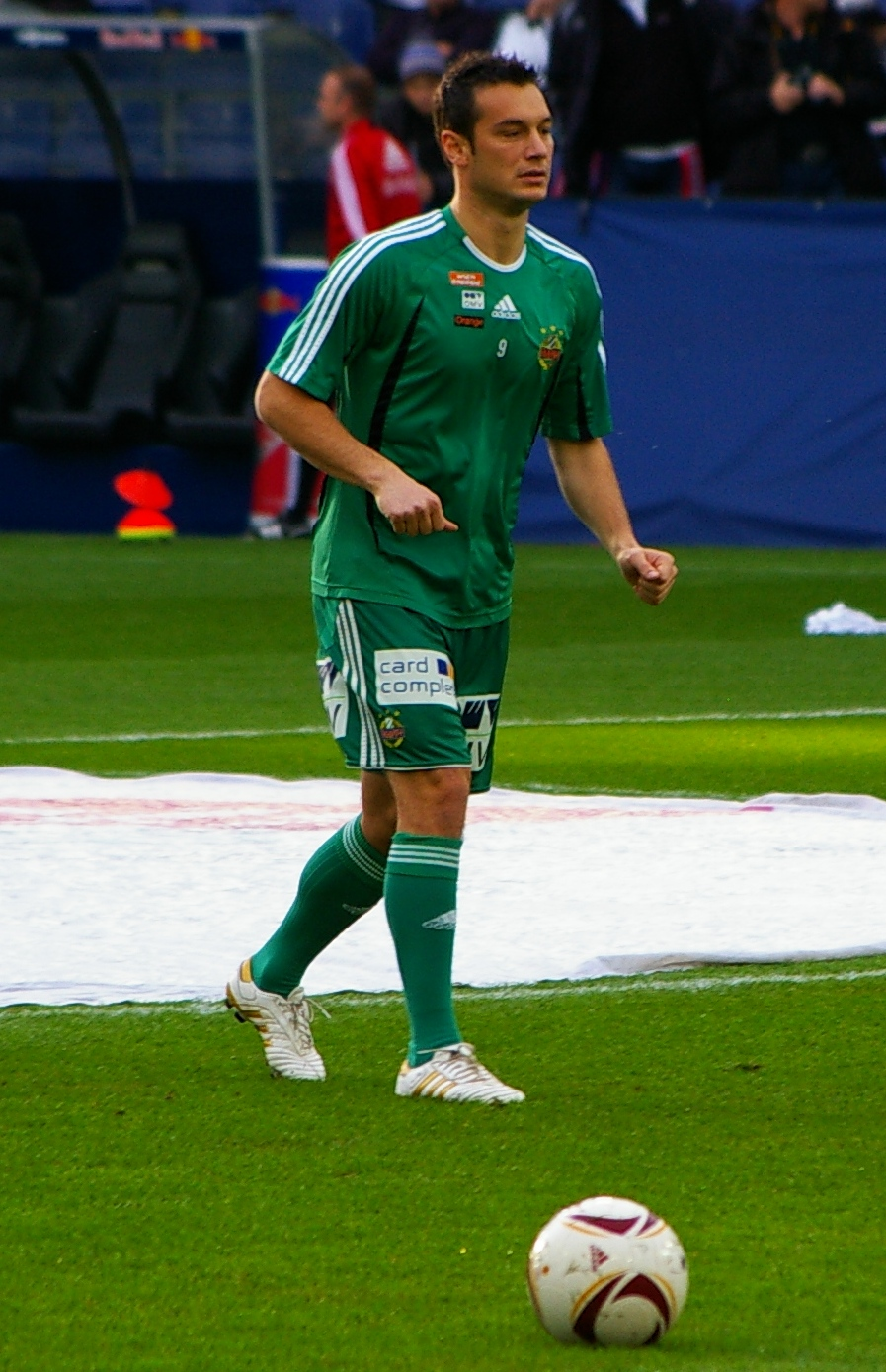
Salihi warming up before the start of the match

On 31 August 2009, Salihi completed a transfer to Austrian giants SK Rapid Wien by penning a three-year contract. On his debut match, brought from the bench and netted in the 83rd minute in the match against Red Bull Salzburg which saved Rapid from the loss as the match ended 2–2.

At the end of the season Salihi scored 17 goals, 2 of which were from the previous club Ried making him the fifth leading goalscorer behind two of his teammates Steffen Hofmann, who was in first, and Nikica Jelavić who was tied in third. At the end of the season Rapid Wien was in third place three points behind champions Red Bull Salzburg and two points behind Austria Wien. Rapid Wien qualified for the 2010–11 UEFA Europa League Second qualifying round.

Salihi opened his scoring account in the 2010–11 season in the match versus SV Mattersburg on 22 August 2010. It was followed by a brace in the 3–2 home win against Kapfenberger SV on 25 September. Then he scored in the match day 4 of UEFA Europa League Group L against CSKA Sofia as the match was lost. Salihi produced a splendid performance later that month by netting four goals in the 5–0 home win against LASK Linz which lifted his tally to 7 seven goals. The goals were followed by the winner against Austria Wien which lifted the team in sixth position, 5 points short of "European zone".

=== D.C. United ===
On 2 February 2012, Salihi signed with Major League Soccer side D.C. United as a designated player. On 25 February 2012, he scored his first goal with DC United in a preseason match.

=== Jiangsu Sainty ===
On 3 February 2013, Chinese Super League side Jiangsu Sainty official announced that they had signed Hamdi Salihi from D.C. United to replace injured Cristian Dănălache. On 26 February, he scored his first goal in his debut for Jiangsu, in a 5–1 away defeat against K League champions FC Seoul in the first round of 2013 AFC Champions League group stage match. On 3 March, Salihi won his first title in China in the 2013 Chinese FA Super Cup which Jiangsu Sainty beat Super League and FA Cup winners Guangzhou Evergrande 2–1. He forced Guangzhou's Zhang Linpeng to score an own goal in the 18th minute. He then squeezed in his first goal in the league in another 2–1 win against the newly promoted Wuhan Zall with a low-fly header. He scored twice (a penalty kick and a last-minute equalizer) in the following home fixture, who witnessed a tough 2–2 tie of his team against Shanghai Shenxin. Hamdi Salihi scored again in 2013 AFC Champions League group stage against Japan team Vegalta Sendai in last match in Group E.

=== Hapoel Ironi Acre ===
On 1 February 2014, Salihi joined Hapoel Ironi Acre on a free transfer by penning an 18-month contract. He took squad number 14, and made his debut nine days later in the 2–1 home win over Hapoel Tel Aviv. He opened his scoring account on 15 February by scoring twice against Ironi Ramat Hasharon finished in the victory 4–3 coming from behind of 1–3 in the first half, where Salihi scored goal of 2–3 in the 53rd minute and an equalizing goal to make it 3–3 in 57th minute. Later on 1 March 2014, Salihi scored an overhead bicycle kick inside the zone to beat goalkeeper Amir Edri for his side only goal in the home draw against Maccabi Haifa. The goal took international notoriety.

Then, he endured a 540-minute scoreless run across 6 matches, receiving critics from Israel's media. He returned to scoring on 26 April by netting the matchwinner against Hapoel Haifa. Following that, on 3 May, Salihi netted the opener via penalty kick against Beitar Jerusalem finished in an away victory 0–2. This was followed by another penalty goal in the next match against Ironi Ramat Hasharon which ended in a 1–2 home loss. Salihi ended the season with 13 matches played on where scored in total 6 goals.

He started another season with Hapoel Acre, the 2014–15 season with the match valid for the 2014–15 Israel State Cup against Maccabi Haifa on 13 August 2014, finished in the 2–1 loss, where Salihi scored a goal as well, in the 27th minute the opening goal. On 13 September 2014, he played his first league match in the 1–1 draw against Hapoel Haifa. On 13 December 2014, Salihi scored two important goals in the 2–2 away draw against the top table team, Hapoel Ironi Kiryat Shmona. When his team were losing 2–0, he scored with a precise header in the 59th minute and then scored again in the 75th minute to make equal balanced everything from behind.

=== Hapoel Haifa ===
On 2 February 2015, Salihi signed with Israeli club Hapoel Haifa becoming one of the highest paid players in the domestic league, with a salary of $20,000 per month. He closed recent disputes between manager Niki Vaknin and club managers, who then agreed and he signed for a year and a half. Salihi scored 4 goals in 10 games helping the club to ensure survival in the Israeli Premier League.

=== Skënderbeu Korçë ===
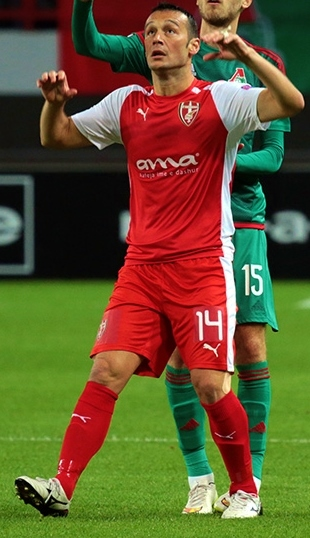
Salihi playing with Skënderbeu Korçë in the Europa League

In July 2015, it was reported that Salihi joined Skënderbeu Korçë for their UEFA Champions League campaign, taking the vacant number 14. The team coach Mirel Josa said that he was happy for the signing of Salihi, adding that "Salihi would be a great value if he stayed until the end of the season. I'm more than happy for this transfer".

==== 2015–16 season ====
He made his debut on 14 July 2015, in the first leg of second qualifying round of 2015–16 UEFA Champions League against Crusaders, scoring two goals for a crucial 4–1 victory. In the second leg on 21 July, Salihi assisted the second goal of his team scored by Latifi, with Skënderbeu losing 3–2 but qualifying on aggregate 6–4.

In the third round, the team was seeded with Moldavian side Milsami Orhei. In the first leg at Zimbru Stadium, Salihi was again the matchwinner by scoring twice, helping the team to prevail 2–0. In the returning leg at Elbasan Arena, Salihi was again in the scoresheet as Skënderbeu recorded another 2–0 win, advancing in play-off round with the aggregate 4–0. By doing this, Skenderbeu become first Albanian club to reach the Champions League play-offs.

On 12 August, in the 2015 Albanian Supercup match against Laçi at Qemal Stafa Stadium, Salihi came on the field in place of the injured Arbër Abilaliaj and scored twice in an eventual 2–2 draw; Laçi, however, won the trophy after beating Skënderbeu 8–7 in the penalty shootouts, Salihi himself scored his attempt.

In play-off, Skënderbeu was easily defeated by Croatian giants Dinamo Zagreb with the aggregate 6–2. Skënderbeu secured the Europa League group stage, becoming first Albanian club to reach that. After the end of the team's Champions League campaign, Salihi was second top goalscorer with five goals, two behind from Maccabi Tel Aviv's Eran Zahavi. After the end of the club's UEFA Champions League campaign, the club itself confirmed via its official Facebook page that Salihi would remain in the club for the rest of 2015–16 season.

Salihi made his league debut on 9 September in the 1–0 away win against Vllaznia Shkodër, suffering an early injury and was subbed off in the 19th minute. However, he was recovered in time for the Europa League group stage match against Beşiktaş, where he played in the last 20 minutes of a 0–1 home defeat. Salihi scored his first league goal of the season on 26 September in a 4–1 away win against Bylis Ballsh, netting the third of the match.

Later on 5 October, Salihi scored a brace in Skënderbeu's 3–0 defeat of Laçi, including one goal with penalty. Twenty days later, in the 2–1 away defeat to Partizani Tirana, Salihi scored with a bicycle kick from the penalty area in the eighth minute, gaining international notoriety. Salihi started November with a brace in team's 3–1 home victory against his former side Vllaznia Shkodër on eighth, taking his tally up to 8 goals, overtaking Xhevahir Sukaj in the process. On the last day of November, Salihi scored his tenth league goal in the 2–1 away win against Tirana in the inaugural match in the newly renovated Selman Stërmasi Stadium.

On 20 December, during the league match against the title rivals of Partizani Tirana, Salihi broke his hand in a collision with the goalkeeper Alban Hoxha in the 53rd minute of the match. It was later reported that Salihi would go to Austria for further examinations and he would be out for one month. Salihi kicked off 2016 on 7 February by scoring twice in the 3–1 home win against the rivals Kukësi, placing Skënderbeu two points clear at the top. This was followed by another brace six days later against Tërbuni Pukë in a 3–1 away win. On 22 February, Salihi scored the matchwinner via e penalty kick against Tirana, keeping the team in the first place in the league.

On 20 March, Salihi scored his sixth Albanian Superliga hat-trick in team's 5–1 home defeat of Flamurtari Vlorë, taking his tally up to 23 league goals. In April and May, Salihi went to score three more goals, concluding the season with 27 league goals, as Skënderbeu won the title for the sixth year in a row. He finished the season with 35 goals from 42 match across all competitions, setting a new personal best. Salihi ended the season winning the Albanian Superliga Golden Boot for the second time, finishing six goals ahead of Xhevahir Sukaj with 21 goals.

==== 2016–17 season ====
Salihi did not play any European football match due to Skënderbeu ban over match-fixing allegations. He started the season by playing full-90 minutes in the 2016 Albanian Supercup match against Kukësi which ended in a 3–1 defeat at Selman Stërmasi Stadium. Salihi started the league by scoring a brace in the opening match day against Flamurtari Vlorë as Skënderbeu won 2–1 at home. This was followed by another strike in the second match day at newly promoted Korabi Peshkopi for a 2–0 win. On 1 October, Salihi scored another brace to take his tally up to 5 goals as Skënderbeu won against Vllaznia Shkodër to extend the league lead to 5 points.

In December 2016, Salihi was named Albanian Footballer of the Year, becoming the third Skënderbeu player to win it.

On 20 May 2017, during the decisive match against Kukësi for the championship, Salihi along with other teammates were included in a massive brawl with referee Enea Jorgji. Salihi notably was caught tearing the referee's red card and insulting him in the process, however, he was not seen by the referee. Everything started in the 59th minute when the referee didn't give a clear penalty to Skënderbeu after a foul inside the zone on Liridon Latifi, instead booking him for diving. Skënderbeu eventually were defeated 2–0 at Zeqir Ymeri Stadium, meaning that they have failed to win the championship for the first time in six years. Disciplinary Committee of AFA handed him a ten-game ban for all domestic competitions.

On 30 June 2017, following a season full of ups and down on individual aspect, also adding the ban, Salihi officially left Skënderbeu after two seasons. During his time in Korçë, he played 80 matches, including 63 in league, 5 in cup, 2 in supercup and 10 in European competitions, scoring 51 goals, including 42 in league, 2 in cup, 2 in supercup and 5 in European competitions.

=== Wiener Neustadt ===
On 30 June 2017, Salihi completed a transfer to Austrian First League club Wiener Neustadt for an undisclosed fee. The transfer was made official by the club only on 21 July, after he was cleared from his 10-match ban, which could have been a factor to cancel the agreement between the parties.

Salihi made his first appearance on the same day by playing 70 minutes in a 1–0 away win against Ried, making a good overall appearance. His first score-sheet contributions came in his second ever appearance for the club seven days later, scoring a header just inside the zone as Wiener Neustadt recorded a 4–0 home win over Blau-Weiß Linz to take the championship lead. Later on 20 October, Salihi scored all four goals as Wiener Neustadt recorded a 4–2 home win over Kapfenberger SV to stay top of league tied on points with Ried. Salihi reached double figures and took the lead of goalscoring table with 13 goals; it was his second "poker" in career, first being in November 2010. The feat was followed by the winner against Wattens in the next match day which put Wiener Neustadt top of the table.

The team, however, couldn't keep up the good results in the second part of the season, eventually falling to fourth place. On 4 May 2018, Salihi netted his 20th goal of the season with a 96th minute free-kick to give Neustadt the win over Floridsdorfer AC and to keep their hopes for a top flight spot alive. He finished the regular campaign as joint-top scorer along with Ried's Seifedin Chabbi, bagging 22 goals from 33 appearances, all of them as starter, as Wiener Neustadt achieved a play-off spot by finishing third in the championship with 62 points.

Salihi was named club captain ahead of 2018–19 season. On 28 March 2019, Salihi announced that the league game against Wacker Innsbruck two days later would be the last of his career, adding that he would retire afterwards. He played as starter for 52 minutes, unable to prevent a 2–1 home loss.

== International career ==
Salihi scored his first goal for the Albania national team in a 3–0 win over Malta on 23 August 2007. He was sent in the game on the 22nd minute replacing Erjon Bogdani. Only after 12 minutes played, The Bomber took advantage of a mistake made by the Maltese goalie and scored. Salihi also scored the advantage goal in the unofficial friendly against Milan for the Taçi Oil Cup; the match eventually ended 3–3 with Albania losing on penalty shootouts.

The second international goal of Salihi came against Sweden, when he scored for Albania in the last match of the 2010 World Cup qualifiers, where Albania lost 4–1 at Råsunda Stadium. Neither Sweden or Albania qualified for the 2010 World Cup.

For the 2014 World Cup qualifiers, new coach Gianni De Biasi had introduced young forwards into the senior national team to create more competition for places in the first team. Young players forwards such as Edgar Çani, Armando Sadiku and Bekim Balaj provided competition for the established and mature internationals which were Salihi and Erjon Bogdani. In opening group game of the qualifiers, Albania took on Cyprus at the Qemal Stafa Stadium in Tirana, Salihi started the game upfront alongside 21-year-old Armando Sadiku who was making his competitive debut, having featured in three friendly games prior to the game against Cyprus. The pair combined well in the early stages and Salihi had a good chance to score in the first half, before Sadiku opened the scoring in the 36th minute. The game ended in a 3–1 win for Albania following goals from substitutes Edgar Çani and Erjon Bogdani.

On 23 March 2013, Albania played against Norway away at a freezing Ullevaal Stadion in a crucial encounter for both sides. Salihi started the game upfront with Çani and immediately created problems for the Norwegians with a shot on target from an overhead kick in the third minute. He scored the only goal of the game in the 67th minute following a clever run inside the box to put the ball in the right hand corner of the net. The win stunned the hosts to the delight of the away fans who almost outnumbered the home fans. This moved Albania into joint second place in the group 9 points, ahead of Norway who were left on 7 points. Salihi scored his second goal of the campaign on 11 October 2013 in the penultimate match against Switzerland in the 89th minute with a penalty to send the score 2–1, where the game ended with the same score as well. Albania were eliminated from the qualifiers ranking in the fifth place with 11 points, 1 less than Norway, 2 less than Slovenia.

Salihi was called up regularly by the coach Gianni De Biasi in the team's successful UEFA Euro 2016 qualifying campaign. He was, however, used only once in the whole qualifiers, playing the last 21 minutes of the 2–1 home win against Armenia in Elbasan Arena. He was not called up in the provisional 27-man UEFA Euro 2016 squad. This led him to consider the retirement from international football.

== Coaching career ==
On 2 May 2019, Salihi was appointed assistant manager of SC Wiener Neustadt, where he at the time also was playing for. Ahead of the 2019–20 season, he was appointed assistant manager of Edoardo Reja at the Albania national team.

== Career statistics ==
=== Club ===
Appearances and goals by club, season and competition
Club	Season	League			Cup		Continental		Other		Total	
Club	Season	Division	Apps	Goals	Apps	Goals	Apps	Goals	Apps	Goals	Apps	Goals
Vllaznia Shkodër	2002–03	Albanian Superliga	2	0	1	0	—		—		3	0
Vllaznia Shkodër	2003–04	Albanian Superliga	33	14	2	4	2 (Note: All appearance(s) in UEFA Cup)	0	—		37	18
Vllaznia Shkodër	2004–05	Albanian Superliga	20	16	4	4	4 (Note: All appearance(s) in UEFA Intertoto Cup)	2	—		28	22
Vllaznia Shkodër	Total		55	30	7	8	6	2	—		68	40
Panionios	2004–05	Alpha Ethniki	6	0	1	1	—		—		7	1
Tirana	2005–06	Albanian Superliga	35	29	4	2	4 (Note: All appearance(s) in UEFA Champions League)	1	1 (Note: Appearance in Albanian Supercup)	0	44	32
Tirana	2006–07	Albanian Superliga	17	13	2	1	4	2	1	1	24	17
Tirana	Total		52	42	6	3	8	3	2	1	68	49
Ried	2006–07	Austrian Football Bundesliga	15	6	2	0	—		—		17	6
Ried	2007–08	Austrian Football Bundesliga	33	12	2	2	4	2	—		39	16
Ried	2008–09	Austrian Football Bundesliga	28	14	3	2	—		—		31	16
Ried	2009–10	Austrian Football Bundesliga	6	2	1	2	—		—		7	4
Ried	Total		82	34	8	6	4	2	—		94	42
Rapid Wien	2009–10	Austrian Football Bundesliga	23	15	3	1	5 (Note: All appearance(s) in UEFA Europa League)	1	—		31	17
Rapid Wien	2010–11	Austrian Football Bundesliga	32	18	5	6	7	1	—		44	25
Rapid Wien	2011–12	Austrian Football Bundesliga	12	3	3	8	—		—		15	11
Rapid Wien	Total		67	36	11	15	12	2	—		90	53
D.C. United	2012	Major League Soccer	23	6	2	1	—		—		25	7
Jiangsu Sainty	2013	Chinese Super League	28	9	2	1	5 (Note: All appearance(s) in AFC Champions League)	2	1 (Note: Appearance in Chinese FA Super Cup)	0	36	12
Hapoel Acre	2013–14	Israeli Premier League	13	6	—		—		—		13	6
Hapoel Acre	2014–15	Israeli Premier League	20	8	5	1	—		—		25	9
Hapoel Acre	Total		33	14	5	1	—		—		38	15
Hapoel Haifa	2014–15	Israeli Premier League	10	4	—		—		—		10	4
Skënderbeu Korçë	2015–16	Albanian Superliga	30	27	1	1	10 (Note: Five appearances and five goals in UEFA Champions League, five appearances in UEFA Europa League)	5	1	2	42	35
Skënderbeu Korçë	2016–17	Albanian Superliga	33	15	4	1	—		1	0	38	16
Skënderbeu Korçë	Total		63	42	5	2	10	5	2	2	80	51
Wiener Neustadt	2017–18	Austrian Football Second League	33	22	—		—		2 (Note: All appearance(s) in Austrian Football First League promotion play-offs)	1	35	23
Wiener Neustadt	2018–19	Austrian Football Second League	16	5	3	1	—		—		19	6
Wiener Neustadt	Total		49	27	3	1	—		2	1	54	29
Career total			468	244	50	39	45	16	7	4	570	303

=== International ===
Appearances and goals by national team and year
National team	Year	Apps	Goals
Albania	2006	1	0
Albania	2007	5	1
Albania	2008	4	0
Albania	2009	8	1
Albania	2010	9	4
Albania	2011	10	3
Albania	2012	4	0
Albania	2013	6	2
Albania	2014	2	0
Albania	2015	1	0
Total		50	11

Scores and results list Albania's goal tally first, score column indicates score after each Salihi goal.

List of international goals scored by Hamdi Salihi
No.	Date	Venue	Cap	Opponent	Score	Result	Competition
1	22 August 2007	Qemal Stafa Stadium, Tirana, Albania	4	Malta	2–0	3–0	Friendly
2	14 October 2009	Råsunda Stadium, Stockholm, Sweden	17	Sweden	1–4	1–4	2010 FIFA World Cup qualification
3	25 May 2010	Podgorica City Stadium, Podgorica, Montenegro	20	Montenegro	1–0	1–0	Friendly
4	2 June 2010	Qemal Stafa Stadium, Tirana, Albania	21	Andorra	1–0	1–0	Friendly
5	11 August 2010	Niko Dovana Stadium, Durrës, Albania	22	Uzbekistan	1–0	1–0	Friendly
6	7 September 2010	Qemal Stafa Stadium, Tirana, Albania	24	Luxembourg	1–0	1–0	UEFA Euro 2012 qualifying
7	26 March 2011	Qemal Stafa Stadium, Tirana, Albania	29	Belarus	1–0	1–0	UEFA Euro 2012 qualifying
8	10 August 2011	Loro Boriçi Stadium, Shkoder, Albania	31	Montenegro	3–2	3–2	Friendly
9	11 October 2011	Qemal Stafa Stadium, Tirana, Albania	35	Romania	1–0	1–1	UEFA Euro 2012 qualifying
10	23 March 2013	Ullevaal Stadion, Oslo, Norway	42	Norway	1–0	1–1	2014 FIFA World Cup qualification
11	11 October 2013	Qemal Stafa Stadium, Tirana, Albania	46	Switzerland	1–2	1–2	2014 FIFA World Cup qualification

== Honours ==
Vllaznia Shkodër

- Albanian Superliga: runner-up 2002–03

Tirana

- Albanian Superliga: 2006–07; runner-up 2005–06
- Albanian Cup: 2005–06
- Albanian Supercup: 2005, 2006

SV Ried

- Austrian Bundesliga: runner-up 2006–07

Jiangsu Sainty

- Chinese FA Super Cup: 2013

Skënderbeu Korçë

- Albanian Superliga: 2015–16
- Albanian Supercup: runner-up 2016

Individual

- Albanian Superliga Golden Boot: 2005–06, 2015–16
- Albanian Footballer of the Year: 2016
