= Dorian Bylykbashi =

Albanian footballer

Personal information
- Full name: Dorian Bylykbashi
- Date of birth: 8 August 1980 (age 46)
- Place of birth: Elbasan, Albania
- Height: 1.80 m (5 ft 11 in)
- Position: Attacking midfielder

Youth career
- 1995–1997: Elbasani

Senior career*
Years	Team	Apps	(Gls)
1997–1999	Elbasani	45	(9)
1999–2001	Vllaznia	34	(12)
2001–2003	Elbasani	25	(7)
2003–2006	Partizani	94	(41)
2006–2011	Kryvbas Kryvyi Rih	79	(14)
2011–2015	Elbasani	38	(6)
2015–2016	Partizani	13	(2)
Total		328	(91)

International career
2006–2010	Albania	6	(0)
- * Club domestic league appearances and goals

Dorian Bylykbashi (born 8 August 1980, in Elbasan) is a former Albanian footballer. He mainly played as an attacking midfielder and he has previously played for KF Elbasani and Vllaznia Shkodër in Albania as well as for Ukrainian side Kryvbas Kryvyi Rih.

He was in the Partizani squad that won the Albanian Cup and Albanian Supercup in the 2003–04 season.

== Club career ==
=== Elbasani ===
In January 2011, Bylykbashi signed a five-month contract with his first club Elbasani, with Bylykbashi earning €35,000 a season.

=== Partizani Tirana ===
He was unveiled as Partizani Tirana's first January signing at the club's end of year party on 21 December 2014, before the transfer window had opened.

== International career ==
He made his debut for Albania in a March 2006 friendly match against Lithuania and earned a total of 6 caps, scoring no goals. His final international was an August 2010 friendly match against Uzbekistan.

== Honours ==
=== Club ===
Vllaznia

- Albanian Superliga (1): 2000–01

Partizani

- Albanian Cup (1): 2003–04
- Albanian Supercup (1): 2004

Elbasani

- Albanian First Division (2): 2001–02, 2013–14

=== Individual ===
- Albanian Superliga Top goalscorer (1): 2004–05
