= Abílio (footballer) =

Brazilian footballer (born 1975)

Personal information
- Full name: Abílio Neves dos Reis
- Date of birth: 25 March 1975 (age 51)
- Place of birth: Brasília, Brazil
- Height: 1.78 m (5 ft 10 in)
- Position: Forward

Senior career*
| Years | Team | Apps | (Gls) |
| 1997 | Mixto | | |
| 1998 | EC Operário | | |
| 2000 | Pinheiros-RO | | |
| 2000–2004 | Partizani | 66 | (32) |
| 2004–2005 | Vllaznia | 35 | (20) |
| 2005–2006 | Diagoras | | |
| 2008–2009 | Dajti | | |
| 2010 | Operário Ltda. | | |
| 2020 | Santa Cruz-MT | 3 | (1) |
- * Club domestic league appearances and goals

Abílio Neves dos Reis (born 25 March 1975), commonly known as Abílio, is a Brazilian retired footballer who played for Partizani Tirana and Vllaznia Shkodër Albanian Superliga as well as Dajti in the Albanian First Division.
