= Kreshnik Ivanaj =

Albanian footballer

Personal information
- Full name: Kreshnik Ivanaj
- Date of birth: 27 January 1982 (age 44)
- Place of birth: Lezhë, Albania
- Position: Striker

Youth career
- Besëlidhja Lezhë

Senior career*
Years	Team	Apps	(Gls)
2000–2003	Besëlidhja	48	(11)
2003	Bylis		
2004–2005	Shkumbini	33+	(8+)
2006–2008	Besëlidhja	16+	(8+)
2008–2009	Laçi	28	(13)
2009	Kamza	6	(0)
2010	Besëlidhja	14	(3)
2010–2011	Adriatiku	20	(9)
2011	Kukësi	14	(9)
2012	Burreli	14	(18)
2012–2014	Iliria	25+	(9+)
Total		218+	(169)
- * Club domestic league appearances and goals

Kreshnik Ivanaj (born 27 January 1982) is a retired Albanian football player.

== Personal life ==
He is now a physical education teacher at a school in Lezhë.

== Honours ==
Individual

- Albanian First Division Top Goalscorer (1): 2011-12
