= Skerdi Bejzade =

Albanian footballer (born 1974)

Personal information
- Date of birth: 30 November 1974 (age 51)
- Place of birth: Elbasan, Albania
- Position: Forward

Team information
- Current team: Erzeni (manager)

Senior career*
Years	Team	Apps	(Gls)
1991–1993	Dinamo Tirana		
1993–1996	Arminia Hannover		
1996	Dinamo Tirana		
1997–2002	Arminia Hannover		
2002–2003	Vllaznia	21	(8)
2003–2005	Partizani		
2005–2006	Elbasani		
2006–2007	Vllaznia	24	(6)
2007–2009	Elbasani	42	(14)
2009–2011	Partizani	6	(1)

Managerial career
- 2009–2010: Partizani
- 2010–2011: Kamza
- 2013: Kamza
- 2018–2019: Arminia Hannover Youth
- 2019–2022: Arminia Hannover
- 2023: Laçi
- 2024: Erzeni
- * Club domestic league appearances and goals

Skerdi Bejzade (born 30 November 1974) is an Albanian football coach and former player who is head coach of Erzeni in the Kategoria Superiore.

== Managerial career ==
On 3 December 2010, Bejzade became the manager of Albanian First Division side KS Kamza. He left as manager of the club on 10 June 2011 ahead of their first-ever season in the Albanian Superliga, as his children were to begin their education in Germany.

In June 2012, he was named technical director of Elbasani.
