= Pero Pejić =

Croatian footballer (born 1982)

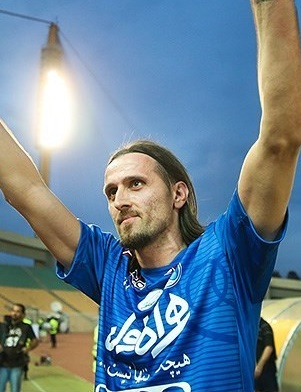
- Pejić with Esteghlal in 2016

Personal information
- Date of birth: 28 November 1982 (age 43)
- Place of birth: Makarska, SR Croatia, Yugoslavia
- Height: 1.90 m (6 ft 3 in)
- Position: Forward

Senior career*
Years	Team	Apps	(Gls)
2000–2002	Vrbovec		
2002–2003	Croatia Sesvete		
2003–2007	Slaven Belupo	90	(12)
2007–2008	Dinamo Tirana	45	(24)
2008–2010	Kapfenberger SV	13	(2)
2010	Croatia Sesvete	13	(1)
2010–2011	Tirana	28	(14)
2011	Al-Faisaly	8	(1)
2012	Flamurtari	13	(9)
2012–2014	Skënderbeu	53	(32)
2014–2015	Kukësi	35	(31)
2015–2016	Esteghlal	13	(3)
2016–2017	Kukësi	34	(28)
2017–2018	Slaven Belupo	22	(3)
Total		367	(160)

International career
2003	Croatia U20	1	(1)
- * Club domestic league appearances and goals

Pero Pejić (born 28 November 1982) is a Croatian retired professional footballer who played as a forward.

With over 100 goals to his name, he is the highest-scoring foreign player in Albanian football history. In 2015, Pejić ranked among the top five goalscorers in Europe.

== Club career ==
=== Early career ===
Pejić began his career at local club NK Zmaj Makarska but soon moved to play for Vrbovec in 2000. After two years at the club, he decided to move to Croatia Sesvete, from there he moved to a bigger club, Slaven Belupo. After three and a half years at the Koprivnica club moved abroad for the first time to play for Albanian side Dinamo Tirana.

=== Dinamo Tirana ===
Pejić moved to Dinamo Tirana in January 2007 and became an immediate hit with fans and players alike, with his scoring ability and his general presence in the side. His first game in Albania was on 3 February 2007 away from home against Kastrioti Krujë in a hard-fought victory. He had to wait until 28 April for his first goal, which was to come in the Tirana derby against Tirana, Pejić scored in the 27th minute but it would prove to be only a consolation as the match was lost 2–1.

However that goal was to open the floodgates of the strikers scoring in Albania, as he managed to hit four goals past Shkumbini Peqin the next week in an emphatic 5–0 victory. The 2006–07 season was not a successful one for Dinamo Tirana as they did not win any trophies and the club only managed a 5th-place finish, although Pejić did score 6 times in 13 games for his side.

He started the 2007–08 season by scoring a hat-trick in the matchday 3 against Kastrioti Krujë, giving his team a comfortable 4–0 home win. Throughout the season, Pejić scored 18 league goals in 31 appearances, as Dinamo Tirana clinched its 17 Albanian Superliga title.

=== Kapfenberger SV ===
In July 2008, Pejić moved to Austria with Kapfenberger SV. His debut in the Austrian top division came on 27 July 2008 against Red Bull Salzburg, after some delay because of the players pass, he came on as a 68th minute replacement for Arno Kozelsky. In the 2008–09 season, he scored in twelve league games completed two hits. After only one use in the 2009–10 season, he was dismissed by the Croatian Association for sports but also for disciplinary reasons

=== Return to Croatia Sesvete ===
In December 2010, Pejić returned to his original club Croatia Sesvete.

=== Tirana ===
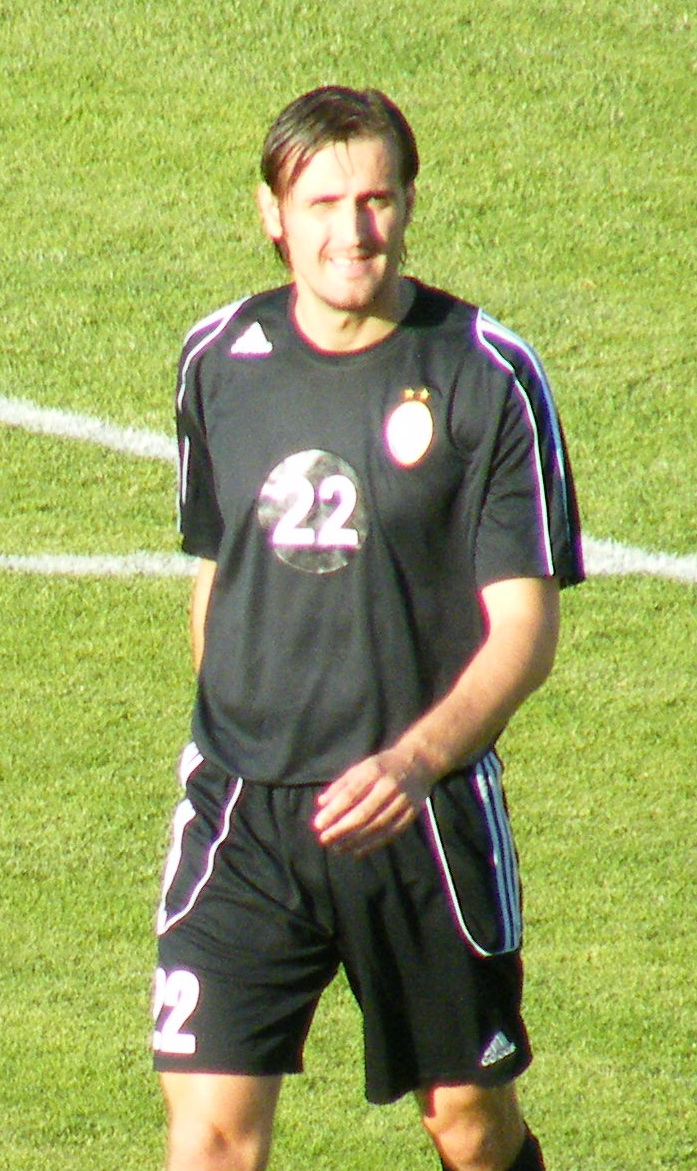
Pejić in action with Tirana during a league match

On 22 June 2010, Pejić returned to Albania by signing a one-year contract with Tirana for €300,000. He was handed squad number 22, and made his competitive debut on 1 July in the goalless draw against Zalaegerszegi in the 2010–11 UEFA Europa League first qualifying round. Tirana progressed to the next round by winning the second match 1–0 after extra time, where they were eliminated 5–1 on aggregate by Utrecht; Pejić played in both matches, and ended his European campaign with four matches.

Pejić made his domestic debut on 22 August in the 1–1 away draw against Elbasani, and scored his first goals for the team in the matchday 3 against Bylis Ballsh, giving his team the first victory of the season.

=== Flamurtari Vlorë ===
Pejić signed for Flamurtari Vlorë on 10 January 2012, along with fellow Croatian Toni Pezo. He made his league debut on 11 February in the 0–1 away win against Kamza, and scored his first goal on 4 March in the 1–1 draw against Teuta Durrës in his second appearance.

=== Skënderbeu Korçë ===
On 1 August 2012, Pejić joined the reigning champions Skënderbeu Korçë on a free transfer. He scored a hat-trick in his league debut on 24 August in the opening league match against Vllaznia Shkodër, which finished in a 3–1 win. He followed that by scoring in team's 1–1 home draw against Bylis Ballsh. Pejić continued with his solid performances by scoring his fifth league goal of the season in the 3–0 home win against Laçi in the matchday 4.

In his Albanian Cup debut for the club, Pejić scored twice in an eventual 7–2 thrashing of Olimpic in the first leg of the first round. Later on 27 October, Pejić scored both goals in the league encounter against his former club Tirana, placing Skënderbeu in the first place; that was his eighth league goal of the season and tenth overall. He added another two to his tally during the match against Flamurtari Vlorë, which finished in a 3–1 home win.

On 15 December, Pejić scored two times in the 4–2 convincing win against Kukësi in the first match of Albanian Cup Group A. He scored again in this competitions four days later in the 2–1 win against Kastrioti Krujë.

Pejić started 2013 by scoring two goals in the 5–1 home win against Kastrioti Krujë in the team's first competitive match of the year. After going scoreless in the next two matches, Pejić returned on the scoresheet on 24 February during the 3–0 win against Bylis Ballsh. During the match, he suffered in injury which kept him sidelined for the match against Laçi. He returned on the field on 9 March in the match against Tomori Berat by entering as a substitute, and scored his first goal after three months during the 4–3 away defeat to Kukësi. Pejić finished the season by scoring 18 goals between league and cup in 29 appearances, as Skënderbeu Korçë were crowned champions of Albania for the third consecutive season.

=== Kukësi ===
On 16 June 2014, Pejić joined Kukësi on free agent, signing a one-year contract with worth €80,000 a year. He was handed squad number 22, a number which he previously held with Skënderbeu Korçë. During his presentation, the Croatian striker explained that the reason he signed with Kukësi was due to the expiry of his contract with Skënderbeu on 31 May and because a debt which the club had not paid to him. This was the reason why he did not sign the renewal contract with Albanian champions.

He made his competitive debut on 24 August in the opening league match of the season against Vllaznia Shkodër at Loro Boriçi Stadium, scoring the first of the match in an eventual 2–1 win. He followed that by scoring in the 3–0 home win against the newly promoted side Elbasani on 31 August. He returned in the scoresheet on 26 September in the matchday 5, scoring the lone goal against Apolonia Fier. On 1 October, in the first leg of Albanian Cup first round, Pejić scored twice to help the team overcome the 1–0 disadvantage against the underdogs of Vora. He continued with his goalscoring form, scoring the winner against Teuta Durrës on 5 October and another two against Elbasani on 2 November. Pejić started December with a brace against Teuta Durrës on 12th, helping the team to win the match 0–3, and later scored the only goal in the 1–0 victory against Flamurtari Vlorë. Kukësi ended the first part of the season as the "winter champions" with 38 points, while Pejić scored 10 goals in 17 matches.

=== Esteghlal ===
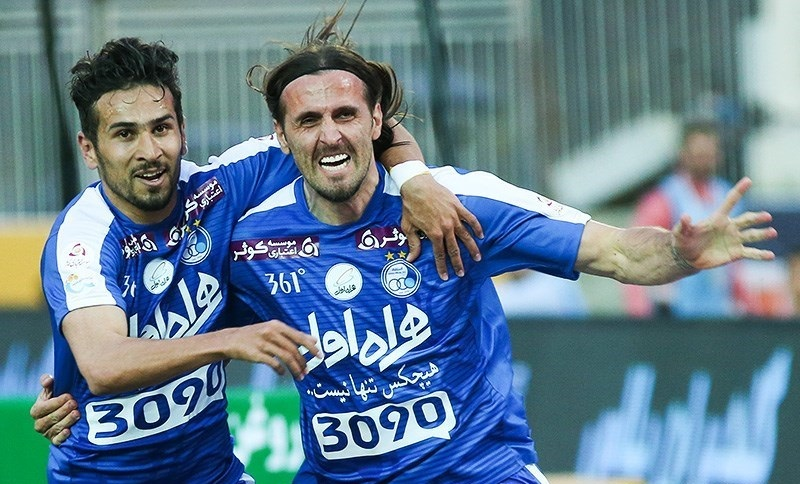
Pejić with Sajjad Shahbazzadeh after scoring a goal against Saipa, 28 April 2016

On 2 August 2015, Pejić Joined Iranian Pro League club Esteghlal signing a two-year contract. On 14 August 2015, he made his debut for Esteghlal in a match against Zob Ahan. He scored his debut goal in a Hazfi Cup match against Shahrdari Semnan. On 20 November 2015, Pejić came off the bench in the 86th minute and scored the second goal in a 2–0 away victory over Foolad.

=== Return to Kukësi ===
Pejić returned to Albania and despite interest from several Albanian Superliga clubs he decided to return to Kukësi on 30 July 2016 following a year long absence. He made his return debut on 25 August in the 2016 Albanian Supercup against Skënderbeu, starting and scoring his team's third goal in an eventual 3–1 win, winning his first silverware with the club. He made his first league appearance of the season on 7 September in the goalless draw against Vllaznia in the opening day, and scored his first two goals in the following match, a 3–0 home win against Teuta.

In September 2016, he was named Albanian Superliga Player of the Month for the second time in his career after bagging three goals in four matches. He also become the first foreign player to win the award twice and the first to win it with two different teams. On 1 October, in the clash against the rivals of Partizani at home, Pejić scored the lone goal, heading home a Rrahman Hallaçi cross in the 47th minute to give his team the second ever victory against the capital club. On 18 December, in the match against title challengers Skënderbeu at home, Pejić scored both goals to seal a 2–0 win, becoming the first player to reach double figures in the league. In the last match of 2016, Pejić scored his 11th goal of the season via penalty kick in the away confrontation against Luftëtari, as Kukësi ended the first part of the league as "Winter Champions".

Pejić started 2017 on 27 January in team's league match Vllaznia, notably scoring the winner with a curled right-footed free-kick to help Kukësi extend the gap. Later on 15 April, Pejić scored both goals in a 2–1 home win over Laçi to keep Kukësi top of table tied with Partizani with 5 matches remaining. On 15 May, he scored his first hat-trick of the season and the 8th Albanian Superliga hat-trick against Korabi, becoming the third player with most hat-tricks scored in the league. Five days later, in the decisive league match against Skënderbeu, Pejić produced a Man of the Match performance by scoring both goals, including a last-minute goal, as Kukësi defeated nine-man Skënderbeu 2–0 at home to be crowned Albanian Superliga champions for the first time in history. It was Pejić's 4th Albanian Superliga trophy with three different teams.

=== Return to Slaven Belupo ===
On 29 July 2017, Pejić returned to his homeland and joined Croatian top flight Slaven Belupo on a one-year contract, returning at The Pharmacists after 10 years. He was allocated squad number 9 for the 2017–18 season. Pejić made his return debut on 5 August by playing the second half of the 2–1 home win over Cibalia, and opened his scoring account later on 26 August by netting in the 2–2 draw versus Rudeš.

== Personal life ==
Pejić is married and has two sons (twins). He speaks fluent Croatian and Albanian.

== Career statistics ==
As of 3 June 2018

Appearances and goals by club, season and competition
Club	Season	League			Cup		Continental		Other		Total	
Club	Season	Division	Apps	Goals	Apps	Goals	Apps	Goals	Apps	Goals	Apps	Goals
Slaven Belupo	2003–04	Prva HNL	28	6	0	0	—		—		28	6
Slaven Belupo	2004–05	Prva HNL	15	1	0	0	—		—		15	1
Slaven Belupo	2005–06	Prva HNL	23	5	0	0	1 (Note: Appearance in 2005 UEFA Intertoto Cup)	0	—		24	5
Slaven Belupo	2006–07	Prva HNL	17	1	0	0	—		—		17	1
Slaven Belupo	Total		83	13	0	0	1	0	—		84	13
Dinamo Tirana	2006–07	Albanian Superliga	13	6	0	0	—		—		13	6
Dinamo Tirana	2007–08	Albanian Superliga	31	18	0	0	—		—		31	18
Dinamo Tirana	Total		44	24	0	0	—		—		44	24
Kapfenberger SV	2008–09	Austrian Bundesliga	12	2	3	0	—		—		15	2
Kapfenberger SV	2009–10	Austrian Bundesliga	1	0	1	0	—		—		2	0
Kapfenberger SV	Total		13	2	4	0	—		—		17	2
Croatia Sesvete	2009–10	Prva HNL	13	1	0	0	—		—		13	1
Tirana	2010–11	Albanian Superliga	28	14	4	2	4 (Note: All appearance(s) in UEFA Europa League)	0	—		36	16
Al-Faisaly	2011–12	Saudi Professional League	8	1	0	0	—		—		8	1
Flamurtari Vlorë	2011–12	Albanian Superliga	13	9	8	6	—		—		21	15
Flamurtari Vlorë	2012–13	Albanian Superliga	—		—		2	0	—		2	0
Flamurtari Vlorë	Total		13	9	8	6	2	0	—		23	15
Skënderbeu Korçë	2012–13	Albanian Superliga	23	12	6	6	—		1 (Note: Appearance in Albanian Supercup)	0	30	18
Skënderbeu Korçë	2013–14	Albanian Superliga	30	20	3	1	4 (Note: All appearance(s) in UEFA Champions League)	0	1	1	38	22
Skënderbeu Korçë	Total		53	32	9	7	4	0	2	1	68	40
Kukësi	2014–15	Albanian Superliga	35	31	5	4	1	0	—		41	35
Kukësi	2015–16	Albanian Superliga	—		—		4	3	—		4	3
Kukësi	Total		35	31	5	4	5	3	—		45	38
Esteghlal	2015–16	Persian Gulf Pro League	13	3	3	2	—		—		16	5
Kukësi	2016–17	Albanian Superliga	34	28	1	0	—		1	1	35	29
Kukësi	2017–18	Albanian Superliga	—		—		2	1	—		2	1
Kukësi	Total		34	28	1	0	2	1	1	1	38	30
Slaven Belupo	2017–18	Prva HNL	22	3	2	0	—		—		24	3
Career total			359	161	36	21	18	4	3	2	415	188

== Honours ==
Dinamo Tirana

- Albanian Superliga: 2007–08

Tirana

- Albanian Cup: 2010–11

Skënderbeu Korçë

- Albanian Superliga: 2012–13, 2013–14
- Albanian Supercup: 2013

Kukësi

- Albanian Superliga: 2016-17
- Albanian Supercup: 2016

Individual

- Albanian Superliga Golden Boot: 2013–14, 2014–15, 2016–17
- Albanian Superliga Player of the Month: September 2012, September 2016
