= 2025–26 Kategoria Superiore =

Kategoria Superiore
- Season: 2025–26
- Dates: 22 August 2025 – 31 May 2026
- Champions: Egnatia; 3rd title
- Relegated: Bylis; Flamurtari
- Champions League: Egnatia
- Conference League: Elbasani; Vllaznia; Dinamo City
- Matches: 186
- Goals: 414 (2.23 per match)
- Top goalscorer: Bekim Balaj (14 goals)
- Biggest home win: Dinamo 6–2 Tirana (3 December 2025); Egnatia 5–1 Bylis (22 November 2025)
- Biggest away win: Elbasani 0–4 Egnatia (17 May 2026)
- Highest scoring: Dinamo 6–2 Tirana (3 December 2025)
- Longest winning run: 7 matches Vllaznia
- Longest unbeaten run: 9 matches Egnatia; Elbasani; Tirana; Vllaznia
- Longest winless run: 12 matches Tirana
- Longest losing run: 5 matches Flamurtari; Teuta
- All statistics correct as of 31 May 2026.

The 2025–26 Kategoria Superiore was the 87th official season, or 90th season of top-tier football in Albania (including three unofficial championships during World War II) and the 26th season under the name Kategoria Superiore. The season began on 22 August 2025 and ended on 31 May 2026. Egnatia won the league title on 31 May 2026, beating Dinamo City in the final match.

The winners of this season's Kategoria Superiore earned a place in the first qualifying round of the 2026–27 UEFA Champions League, with the second and third placed clubs earning a place in the first qualifying round of the 2026–27 UEFA Conference League.

== Teams ==
Two clubs have earned promotion from the Kategoria e Parë, Flamurtari (promoted after a five-year absence) and Vora (promoted for the first time in their history). Laçi (relegated after sixteen years in the top flight) and Skënderbeu (relegated after two years in the top flight) were relegated to Kategoria e Parë at the conclusion of last season.

=== Locations ===
2025–26 Kategoria Superiore teams.

Team	Home city	Stadium	Capacity	2024–25 season
Bylis	Ballsh	Adush Muçaj Stadium	2,464	7th
Dinamo City	Tirana	Arena Kombëtare	22,500	4th
Egnatia	Rrogozhinë	Egnatia Arena	4,267	Champion
Elbasani	Elbasan	Elbasan Arena	12,800	5th
Flamurtari	Vlorë	Flamurtari Stadium	5,600	Runner-up (Kategoria e Parë)
Partizani	Tirana	Arena e Demave	3,959	3rd
Teuta	Durrës	Niko Dovana Stadium	12,040	6th
Tirana	Tirana	Selman Stërmasi Stadium	7,308	8th
Vllaznia	Shkodër	Loro Boriçi Stadium	16,022	2nd
Vora	Vorë	Vora Stadium	1,436	Champion (Kategoria e Parë)

=== Stadiums ===
Bylis	Dinamo City	Egnatia	Elbasani	Flamurtari
Adush Muçaj Stadium	Arena Kombëtare; UEFA stadium category	Egnatia Arena	Elbasan Arena; UEFA stadium category	Flamurtari Stadium
Capacity: 2,464	Capacity: 22,500	Capacity: 4,267	Capacity: 12,800	Capacity: 5,600
Partizani	Teuta	Tirana	Vllaznia	Vora
Arena e Demave	Niko Dovana Stadium	Selman Stërmasi Stadium	Loro Boriçi Stadium; UEFA stadium category	Vora Stadium
Capacity: 3,959	Capacity: 12,040	Capacity: 7,308	Capacity: 16,022	Capacity: 3,200

=== Personnel and kits ===
Note: Flags indicate national team as has been defined under FIFA eligibility rules. Players and Managers may hold more than one non-FIFA nationality.

Team	President	Manager	Captain	Kit manufacturer	Shirt sponsor
Bylis	(Albania) Besnik Kapllanaj	(Albania) Mirel Josa	(Albania) Aurel Marku	Macron	
Dinamo City	(Albania) Ardian Bardhi	(Albania) Ilir Daja	(Albania) Bruno Dita	Kappa	Caffè Pascucci
Egnatia	(Albania) Agim Demrozi	(Albania) Nevil Dede	(Albania) Albano Aleksi	Joma	Demrozi Construction
Elbasani	(Albania) Kujtim Llupa	(Serbia) Ivan Gvozdenović	(Albania) Bruno Lulaj	Cohl's	Kurum
Flamurtari	(Albania) Sinan Idrizi	(Albania) Andi Ribaj	(Albania) Denis Pjeshka	Adidas	
Partizani	(Albania) Gazmend Demi	(Albania) Realf Zhivanaj	(Albania) Alban Hoxha	Joma	
Teuta	(Albania) Fatos Troplini	(Albania) Bledar Hodo	(Albania) Blerim Kotobelli	Macron	
Tirana	(Albania) Refik Halili	(Albania) Orges Shehi	(Albania) Redon Xhixha	Joma	
Vllaznia	(Albania) Alban Xhaferi	(Albania) Edi Martini	(Albania) Bekim Balaj	Suzmar	AL Invest
Vora	(Albania) Albert Xhabafti	(Albania) Arjan Bellaj	(Albania) Xhuljo Tabaku	Macron	RAMS Global

=== Managerial changes ===
Team	Outgoing manager	Manner of departure	Date of vacancy	Position in table	Incoming manager	Date of appointment
Vllaznia	(Germany) Thomas Brdarić	Sacked	13 May 2025	Pre-season	(Albania) Edi Martini	15 May 2025
Flamurtari	(North Macedonia) Artim Pollozhani	Mutual consent	26 May 2025	Pre-season	(Spain) Carlos García	27 June 2025
Tirana	(Albania) Bledi Shkëmbi	Mutual consent	19 June 2025	Pre-season	(Albania) Vangjel Mile	14 July 2025
Teuta	(Albania) Bledar Hodo	Mutual consent	7 July 2025	Pre-season	(Albania) Enkeleid Dobi	7 July 2025
Bylis	(Albania) Gentian Mezani	Mutual consent	21 July 2025	Pre-season	(Albania) Mirel Josa	21 July 2025
Partizani	(Albania) Skënder Gega	Resigned	23 July 2025	Pre-season	(Serbia) Mladen Milinković	6 August 2025
Tirana	(Albania) Vangjel Mile	Mutual consent	7 September 2025	10th	(Italy) Roberto Bordin	7 September 2025
Partizani	(Serbia) Mladen Milinković	Sacked	6 October 2025	9th	(Albania) Oltijon Kërnaja	7 October 2025
Flamurtari	(Spain) Carlos García	Mutual consent	7 October 2025	10th	(Italy) Francesco Moriero	8 October 2025
Tirana	(Italy) Roberto Bordin	Mutual consent	31 October 2025	9th	(North Macedonia) Ardian Nuhiu	31 October 2025
Tirana	(North Macedonia) Ardian Nuhiu	Mutual consent	23 February 2026	9th	(Albania) Orges Shehi	23 February 2026
Flamurtari	(Italy) Francesco Moriero	Mutual consent	9 March 2026	9th	(Albania) Andi Ribaj	9 March 2026
Partizani	(Albania) Oltijon Kërnaja	Sacked	30 April 2026	5th	(Albania) Realf Zhivanaj	30 April 2026
Egnatia	(Albania) Edlir Tetova	Mutual consent	3 May 2026	3rd	(Albania) Nevil Dede	4 May 2026
Teuta	(Albania) Enkeleid Dobi	Resigned	3 May 2026	6th	(Albania) Bledar Hodo	3 May 2026

== League table ==
Pos	Team	Pld	W	D	L	GF	GA	GD	Pts	Qualification or relegation
1	Vllaznia	36	18	9	9	42	27	+15	63	Qualification for the Final four round
2	Elbasani	36	17	11	8	48	37	+11	62	Qualification for the Final four round
3	Egnatia (C)	36	16	9	11	42	34	+8	57	Qualification for the Final four round
4	Dinamo City	36	12	13	11	43	33	+10	49	Qualification for the Final four round
5	Partizani	36	13	9	14	38	48	−10	48	
6	Tirana	36	11	11	14	36	46	−10	44	
7	Vora	36	10	12	14	39	40	−1	42	
8	Teuta (O)	36	9	15	12	32	37	−5	42	Qualification for the relegation play-off
9	Bylis (R)	36	10	11	15	38	50	−12	41	Relegation to the 2026–27 Kategoria e Parë
10	Flamurtari (R)	36	8	12	16	39	45	−6	36	Relegation to the 2026–27 Kategoria e Parë

Source: Albanian Football Association
Rules for classification: 1) Points; 2) Head-to-head points; 3) Head-to-head goal difference; 4) Head-to-head goals scored; 5) Goal difference; 6) Goals scored; 7) Draw.
(C) Champions; (O) Play-off winners; (R) Relegated

== Results ==
Clubs will play each other four times for a total of 36 matches each.

=== First half of season ===
Home \ Away	BYL	DIN	EGN	ELB	FLA	PAR	TEU	TIR	VLL	VOR
Bylis	—	0–0	0–1	3–2	0–1	3–1	1–1	0–0	0–1	2–1
Dinamo	0–0	—	1–2	1–1	2–0	2–0	0–0	6–2	3–1	2–1
Egnatia	5–1	0–0	—	1–1	0–1	2–1	1–0	2–0	2–2	2–0
Elbasani	2–1	1–0	1–0	—	1–0	0–0	0–0	1–1	1–0	1–2
Flamurtari	3–3	0–3	1–2	0–1	—	0–1	2–2	1–1	1–0	1–1
Partizani	1–0	1–3	0–0	0–1	2–1	—	0–0	0–3	1–1	1–0
Teuta	1–0	1–0	0–1	0–0	3–2	2–3	—	1–1	1–1	1–1
Tirana	0–2	1–2	0–1	1–4	1–1	0–2	0–0	—	1–1	0–2
Vllaznia	1–1	1–0	2–0	1–0	3–2	4–1	0–1	3–1	—	2–0
Vora	4–1	0–2	0–1	0–1	1–0	0–0	0–1	3–1	0–0	—

Source: Albanian Football Association
Legend: Blue = home team win; Yellow = draw; Red = away team win.

=== Second half of season ===
Home \ Away	BYL	DIN	EGN	ELB	FLA	PAR	TEU	TIR	VLL	VOR
Bylis	—	1–1	2–2	2–1	2–1	1–2	2–0	0–1	2–1	1–0
Dinamo	0–0	—	2–0	4–1	1–1	0–2	0–1	1–1	0–2	2–2
Egnatia	3–0	1–0	—	2–2	0–2	2–0	4–2	0–1	0–0	0–2
Elbasani	1–1	2–0	0–0	—	1–1	3–0	2–1	1–3	3–1	2–1
Flamurtari	3–0	3–1	0–1	1–2	—	1–2	1–1	1–1	1–0	1–1
Partizani	1–1	2–1	2–0	2–2	1–4	—	2–1	2–0	0–2	0–1
Teuta	2–1	0–0	3–2	1–2	1–1	2–2	—	0–1	0–1	1–1
Tirana	1–0	1–1	3–1	0–1	1–0	2–1	0–1	—	1–0	3–0
Vllaznia	0–2	0–0	1–0	2–1	2–0	1–0	1–0	3–1	—	1–0
Vora	5–2	1–2	1–1	4–2	0–0	2–2	1–0	1–1	0–0	—

Source: Albanian Football Association
Legend: Blue = home team win; Yellow = draw; Red = away team win.

== Final four round ==
The four teams that qualified to the final four round played an additional round between each other. Their points were halved, rounded downwards. All matches were played in Arena Kombëtare, which serves as a neutral ground.

=== Final four table ===
Pos	Team	Pld	W	D	L	GF	GA	GD	Pts	Qualification or relegation	EGN	ELB	VLL	DIN
1	Egnatia (C)	3	3	0	0	8	1	+7	37 (Note: Tied on head to head points. Head to head goal difference: Egnatia +3, Elbasani –3.)	Qualification for the Champions League first qualifying round				2–0
2	Elbasani	3	2	0	1	5	5	0	37	Qualification for the Conference League first qualifying round (Note: Dinamo City qualified for the Conference League first qualifying round as the 2025–26 Albanian Cup winners.)	0–4			3–0
3	Vllaznia	3	0	0	3	2	6	−4	31	Qualification for the Conference League first qualifying round	1–2	1–2		0–2
4	Dinamo City	3	1	0	2	2	5	−3	27	Qualification for the Conference League first qualifying round				

Source: Albanian Football Association
Legend: Blue = home team win; Yellow = draw; Red = away team win.
Rules for classification: 1) Points; 2) Head-to-head points; 3) Head-to-head goal difference; 4) Head-to-head goals scored; 5) Goal difference; 6) Goals scored; 7) Draw.
(C) Champions

== Relegation play-off ==
16 May 2026
16:00

Teuta	1−0	Pogradeci
Daci 90+3'

Niko Dovana Stadium, Durrës
Referee: Enea Jorgji

== Season statistics ==
=== Scoring ===
==== Top scorers ====
As of 31 May 2026

Rank	Player	Club	Goals
1	(Albania) Bekim Balaj	Vllaznia	14
2	(Albania) Irgi Kasalla	Vora	13
3	(Albania) Erald Maksuti	Flamurtari	12
4	(Cameroon) Blaise Tsague	Elbasani	11
5	(Albania) Dejvi Bregu	Dinamo City	10
5	(Albania) Xhonatan Lajthia	Elbasani	10

=== Hat-tricks ===
Player	Club	Against	Result	Date
(Ivory Coast) Soumaila Bakayoko	Egnatia	Bylis	5–1 (H)	22 November 2025
(Nigeria) Ibrahim Mustapha	Bylis	Elbasani	3–2 (H)	20 December 2025
(Cameroon) Daniel Adjessa	Egnatia	Bylis	3–0 (H)	4 April 2026
(Albania) Erald Maksuti	Flamurtari	Dinamo City	3–1 (H)	27 April 2026

Notes

(H) – Home team
(A) – Away team

== See also ==
- 2025–26 Kategoria e Parë
- 2025–26 Kategoria e Dytë
- 2025–26 Kategoria e Tretë
- 2025–26 Albanian Cup

== Notes and references ==
1. Dinamo City is playing their 2025–26 home games in various stadiums depending on availability.
