= 2022–23 Kategoria Superiore =

Kategoria Superiore
- Season: 2022–23
- Dates: 19 August 2022 – 29 May 2023
- Champions: Partizani; 17th title
- Relegated: Bylis; Kastrioti
- Champions League: Partizani
- Europa Conference League: Tirana; Egnatia; Vllaznia
- Matches: 180
- Goals: 399 (2.22 per match)
- Top goalscorer: Florent Hasani (16 goals)
- Biggest home win: Tirana 4–0 Kastrioti (12 December 2022); Tirana 4–0 Teuta (16 September 2022); Vllaznia 4–0 Teuta (22 December 2022)
- Biggest away win: Vllaznia 0–4 Egnatia (30 April 2023)
- Highest scoring: Laçi 4–3 Teuta (30 January 2023)
- Longest winning run: 5 matches Tirana
- Longest unbeaten run: 7 matches Partizani; Teuta; Tirana
- Longest winless run: 11 matches Erzeni
- Longest losing run: 5 matches Laçi
- All statistics correct as of 29 May 2023.

The 2022–23 Kategoria Superiore was the 84th official season, or 87th season of top-tier football in Albania (including three unofficial championships during World War II) and the 23rd season under the name Kategoria Superiore. The season began on 19 August 2022 and ended on 29 May 2023. Partizani won the league title on 29 May 2023, on the last matchday.

The winners of this season's Kategoria Superiore earned a place in the first qualifying round of the 2023–24 Champions League, with the second and third placed clubs earning a place in the first qualifying round of the 2023–24 Europa Conference League.

== Teams ==
Two clubs have earned promotion from the Kategoria e Parë, Bylis (promoted after a one-year absence) and Erzeni (promoted after a nineteen-year absence). Dinamo Tirana (relegated after only one year in the top flight) and Skënderbeu (relegated after thirteen years in the top flight) were relegated to Kategoria e Parë at the conclusion of last season.

=== Locations ===
2022–23 Kategoria Superiore teams.

| Team | Home city | Stadium | Capacity | 2022–23 season |
|---|---|---|---|---|
| Bylis | Ballsh | Adush Muça Stadium | 5,200 | Champion (Kategoria e Parë) |
| Egnatia | Rrogozhinë | Arena Egnatia | 4,000 | 8th |
| Erzeni | Shijak | Niko Dovana Stadium | 12,040 | Runner-up (Kategoria e Parë) |
| Kastrioti | Krujë | Kamëz Stadium | 5,500 | 7th |
| Kukësi | Kukës | Kukës Arena | 6,322 | 4th |
| Laçi | Laç | Laçi Stadium | 2,300 | 2nd |
| Partizani | Tirana | Partizani Complex | 4,500 | 3rd |
| Teuta | Durrës | Niko Dovana Stadium | 12,040 | 6th |
| Tirana | Tirana | Selman Stërmasi Stadium | 9,500 | Champion |
| Vllaznia | Shkodër | Loro Boriçi Stadium | 16,000 | 5th |

=== Stadiums ===
| Bylis | Egnatia | Erzeni | Kastrioti | Kukësi |
| Adush Muça Stadium | Arena Egnatia | Niko Dovana Stadium | Kamëz Stadium | Kukës Arena; UEFA stadium category |
| Capacity: 5,200 | Capacity: 4,000 | Capacity: 12,040 | Capacity: 5,500 | Capacity: 6,322 |
| Laçi | Partizani | Teuta | Tirana | Vllaznia |
| Laçi Stadium | Partizani Complex | Niko Dovana Stadium | Selman Stërmasi Stadium | Loro Boriçi Stadium; UEFA stadium category |
| Capacity: 2,300 | Capacity: 4,500 | Capacity: 12,040 | Capacity: 9,500 | Capacity: 16,000 |

=== Personnel and kits ===
Note: Flags indicate national team as has been defined under FIFA eligibility rules. Players and Managers may hold more than one non-FIFA nationality.

| Team | President | Manager | Captain | Kit manufacturer | Shirt sponsor |
|---|---|---|---|---|---|
| Bylis | (Albania) Besnik Kapllanaj | (Kosovo) Naci Şensoy | (Albania) Aldo Teqja | Joma | Atlantik |
| Egnatia | (Albania) Agim Demrozi | (Albania) Edlir Tetova | (Brazil) Jackson | Joma | Spitali Amavita |
| Erzeni | (Albania) Elton Arbana | (Albania) Alfred Deliallisi | (Albania) Gëzim Krasniqi | Macron | Sinani |
| Kastrioti | (Albania) Alban Vogli | (Albania) Emiliano Çela | (Albania) Abaz Karakaçi | Joma | Qafshtama |
| Kukësi | (Albania) Safet Gjici | (Albania) Rrahman Hallaçi | (Kosovo) Gjelbrim Taipi | Joma | Kevin Construction |
| Laçi | (Albania) Pashk Laska | (Albania) Stavri Nica | (Kosovo) Mentor Mazrekaj | Uhlsport | —N/a |
| Partizani | (Albania) Gazmend Demi | (Italy) Giovanni Colella | (Albania) Bruno Telushi | Macron | —N/a |
| Teuta | (Albania) Edmond Hasanbelliu | (Albania) Edi Martini | (Albania) Blerim Kotobelli | Macron | Tibo |
| Tirana | (Albania) Refik Halili | (Albania) Orges Shehi | (Albania) Ilion Lika | Cohl's | Lori Caffe |
| Vllaznia | (Albania) Alban Xhaferi | (North Macedonia) Goce Sedloski | (Albania) Erdenis Gurishta | Suzmar | Hospital One |

=== Managerial changes ===
| Team | Outgoing manager | Manner of departure | Date of vacancy | Position in table | Incoming manager | Date of appointment |
|---|---|---|---|---|---|---|
| Kukësi | (Italy) Diego Longo | Mutual consent | 28 May 2022 | Pre-season | (Albania) Skënder Gega | 28 May 2022 |
| Egnatia | (North Macedonia) Zekirija Ramadani | End of contract | 1 June 2022 | Pre-season | (Albania) Edlir Tetova | 4 June 2022 |
| Erzeni | (Albania) Nevil Dede | Signed for Dinamo Tirana | 8 July 2022 | Pre-season | (Albania) Xhevahir Kapllani | 13 July 2022 |
| Laçi | (Albania) Shpëtim Duro | Sacked | 31 July 2022 | Pre-season | (Montenegro) Dejan Vukićević | 3 August 2022 |
| Partizani | (Albania) Dritan Mehmeti | Sacked | 9 August 2022 | Pre-season | (Italy) Giovanni Colella | 11 August 2022 |
| Bylis | (North Macedonia) Jeton Beqiri | Mutual consent | 15 August 2022 | Pre-season | (Albania) Arjan Bellaj | 16 August 2022 |
| Teuta | (Albania) Renato Arapi | Mutual consent | 4 September 2022 | 9th | (Albania) Bledi Shkëmbi | 6 September 2022 |
| Kukësi | (Albania) Skënder Gega | Resigned | 10 September 2022 | 10th | (Albania) Enkeleid Dobi | 11 September 2022 |
| Egnatia | (Albania) Edlir Tetova | Mutual consent | 15 October 2022 | 7th | (Albania) Shpëtim Duro | 17 October 2022 |
| Laçi | (Montenegro) Dejan Vukićević | Resigned | 18 November 2022 | 7th | (Albania) Gentian Mezani | 20 November 2022 |
| Teuta | (Albania) Bledi Shkëmbi | Sacked | 21 November 2022 | 10th | (Albania) Edi Martini | 23 November 2022 |
| Kukësi | (Albania) Enkeleid Dobi | Resigned | 11 December 2022 | 8th | (Albania) Rrahman Hallaçi | 11 December 2022 |
| Kastrioti | (Albania) Emiliano Çela | Resigned | 12 December 2022 | 7th | (Albania) Ardian Mema | 14 December 2022 |
| Bylis | (Albania) Arjan Bellaj | Mutual consent | 22 January 2023 | 8th | (Kosovo) Naci Şensoy | 23 January 2022 |
| Egnatia | (Albania) Shpëtim Duro | Sacked | 27 January 2023 | 5th | (Albania) Edlir Tetova | 28 January 2022 |
| Kastrioti | (Albania) Ardian Mema | Resigned | 13 February 2023 | 10th | (Albania) Emiliano Çela | 13 February 2023 |
| Vllaznia | (Albania) Mirel Josa | Mutual consent | 20 March 2023 | 5th | (Albania) Auron Miloti | 20 March 2023 |
| Vllaznia | (Albania) Auron Miloti | End of caretaker spell | 3 April 2023 | 4th | (North Macedonia) Goce Sedloski | 3 April 2023 |
| Laçi | (Albania) Gentian Mezani | Sacked | 5 April 2023 | 8th | (Albania) Stavri Nica | 5 April 2023 |
| Erzeni | (Albania) Xhevahir Kapllani | Sacked | 19 May 2023 | 8th | (Albania) Alfred Deliallisi | 19 May 2023 |

== League table ==
| Pos | Team | Pld | W | D | L | GF | GA | GD | Pts | Qualification or relegation |
|---|---|---|---|---|---|---|---|---|---|---|
| 1 | Partizani (C) | 36 | 20 | 7 | 9 | 56 | 37 | +19 | 67 (Note: Head to head points: Partizani 7, Tirana 4) | Qualification for the Champions League first qualifying round |
| 2 | Tirana | 36 | 20 | 7 | 9 | 56 | 33 | +23 | 67 | Qualification for the Europa Conference League first qualifying round (Note: Egnatia, the winners of the 2022–23 Albanian Cup, qualified for European competitions based on league position. Therefore, the Europa Conference League berth awarded to the Albanian Cup winners was transferred to the fourth-placed team.) |
| 3 | Egnatia | 36 | 14 | 10 | 12 | 46 | 32 | +14 | 52 | Qualification for the Europa Conference League first qualifying round |
| 4 | Vllaznia | 36 | 13 | 11 | 12 | 39 | 37 | +2 | 50 | Qualification for the Europa Conference League first qualifying round |
| 5 | Laçi | 36 | 14 | 6 | 16 | 45 | 46 | −1 | 48 (Note: Head to head points: Laçi 12, Teuta 0) | |
| 6 | Teuta | 36 | 12 | 12 | 12 | 33 | 40 | −7 | 48 | |
| 7 | Kukësi | 36 | 12 | 9 | 15 | 31 | 35 | −4 | 45 | |
| 8 | Erzeni (O) | 36 | 8 | 16 | 12 | 36 | 48 | −12 | 40 | Qualification for the relegation play-off |
| 9 | Bylis (R) | 36 | 9 | 11 | 16 | 31 | 42 | −11 | 38 | Relegation to the 2023–24 Kategoria e Parë |
| 10 | Kastrioti (R) | 36 | 8 | 11 | 17 | 26 | 49 | −23 | 35 | Relegation to the 2023–24 Kategoria e Parë |

Source: Albanian Football Association
Rules for classification: 1) Points; 2) Head-to-head points; 3) Head-to-head goal difference; 4) Head-to-head goals scored; 5) Goal difference; 6) Goals scored; 7) Draw.
(C) Champions; (O) Play-off winners; (R) Relegated

== Results ==
Clubs will play each other four times for a total of 36 matches each.

=== First half of season ===
| Home \ Away | BYL | EGN | ERZ | KAS | KUK | LAÇ | PAR | TEU | TIR | VLL |
|---|---|---|---|---|---|---|---|---|---|---|
| Bylis | — | 0–0 | 4–1 | 2–0 | 0–0 | 0–1 | 0–1 | 0–0 | 0–1 | 1–0 |
| Egnatia | 0–1 | — | 1–1 | 0–0 | 1–2 | 2–0 | 3–0 | 1–2 | 0–2 | 3–0 |
| Erzeni | 1–1 | 0–0 | — | 1–1 | 0–2 | 1–0 | 3–3 | 0–0 | 0–2 | 1–0 |
| Kastrioti | 3–0 | 2–3 | 0–0 | — | 1–1 | 0–1 | 1–1 | 2–1 | 0–0 | 1–0 |
| Kukësi | 2–0 | 0–1 | 0–2 | 1–2 | — | 1–0 | 1–2 | 0–1 | 1–1 | 0–1 |
| Laçi | 0–1 | 0–1 | 1–0 | 4–1 | 0–1 | — | 1–0 | 3–1 | 1–2 | 1–1 |
| Partizani | 2–1 | 2–1 | 0–1 | 0–0 | 2–1 | 1–0 | — | 0–2 | 0–2 | 1–2 |
| Teuta | 1–1 | 1–1 | 1–2 | 2–0 | 0–0 | 0–1 | 1–4 | — | 1–0 | 0–0 |
| Tirana | 4–1 | 1–0 | 0–1 | 4–0 | 4–1 | 3–3 | 0–1 | 4–0 | — | 1–2 |
| Vllaznia | 2–1 | 0–1 | 2–2 | 1–0 | 2–1 | 4–1 | 1–2 | 4–0 | 0–0 | — |

Source: Albanian Football Association
Legend: Blue = home team win; Yellow = draw; Red = away team win.

=== Second half of season ===
| Home \ Away | BYL | EGN | ERZ | KAS | KUK | LAÇ | PAR | TEU | TIR | VLL |
|---|---|---|---|---|---|---|---|---|---|---|
| Bylis | — | 2–3 | 1–1 | 1–0 | 1–1 | 0–2 | 0–1 | 2–2 | 1–1 | 1–2 |
| Egnatia | 2–0 | — | 3–2 | 4–1 | 0–1 | 1–1 | 1–1 | 1–1 | 1–2 | 0–0 |
| Erzeni | 1–2 | 2–1 | — | 0–0 | 1–1 | 1–1 | 1–2 | 1–1 | 1–2 | 3–2 |
| Kastrioti | 0–2 | 1–0 | 2–2 | — | 1–0 | 2–1 | 1–4 | 0–0 | 0–1 | 2–2 |
| Kukësi | 2–0 | 0–3 | 0–0 | 1–0 | — | 3–0 | 1–0 | 0–0 | 2–0 | 0–0 |
| Laçi | 0–1 | 0–1 | 1–1 | 3–0 | 1–2 | — | 3–2 | 4–3 | 1–3 | 2–0 |
| Partizani | 2–1 | 1–1 | 3–0 | 4–1 | 3–1 | 1–2 | — | 2–0 | 2–0 | 2–1 |
| Teuta | 1–0 | 1–0 | 2–0 | 1–0 | 1–0 | 1–2 | 0–2 | — | 2–1 | 1–1 |
| Tirana | 2–2 | 2–1 | 3–1 | 1–0 | 2–1 | 3–2 | 1–1 | 0–2 | — | 0–1 |
| Vllaznia | 0–0 | 0–4 | 3–1 | 0–1 | 2–0 | 1–1 | 1–1 | 1–0 | 0–1 | — |

Source: Albanian Football Association
Legend: Blue = home team win; Yellow = draw; Red = away team win.

=== Positions by round ===
The table lists the positions of teams after each week of matches.

| Team ╲ Round | 1 | 2 | 3 | 4 | 5 | 6 | 7 | 8 | 9 | 10 | 11 | 12 | 13 | 14 | 15 | 16 | 17 | 18 | 19 | 20 | 21 | 22 | 23 | 24 | 25 | 26 | 27 | 28 | 29 | 30 | 31 | 32 | 33 | 34 | 35 | 36 |
|---|---|---|---|---|---|---|---|---|---|---|---|---|---|---|---|---|---|---|---|---|---|---|---|---|---|---|---|---|---|---|---|---|---|---|---|---|
| Partizani | 3 | 1 | 1 | 1 | 1 | 1 | 1 | 1 | 1 | 1 | 2 | 2 | 2 | 1 | 1 | 1 | 2 | 2 | 2 | 3 | 3 | 2 | 2 | 1 | 2 | 1 | 1 | 2 | 2 | 2 | 2 | 2 | 2 | 2 | 1 | 1 |
| Tirana | 5 | 3 | 4 | 6 | 4 | 2 | 2 | 2 | 3 | 2 | 1 | 1 | 1 | 2 | 2 | 2 | 1 | 1 | 1 | 1 | 1 | 1 | 1 | 2 | 1 | 2 | 2 | 1 | 1 | 1 | 1 | 1 | 1 | 1 | 2 | 2 |
| Egnatia | 7 | 10 | 7 | 4 | 6 | 6 | 6 | 8 | 5 | 4 | 5 | 5 | 3 | 3 | 3 | 3 | 5 | 5 | 5 | 6 | 5 | 5 | 4 | 3 | 3 | 3 | 3 | 3 | 3 | 3 | 3 | 3 | 3 | 3 | 3 | 3 |
| Vllaznia | 8 | 6 | 2 | 5 | 3 | 5 | 5 | 6 | 4 | 5 | 3 | 4 | 5 | 6 | 5 | 4 | 3 | 3 | 4 | 2 | 2 | 3 | 3 | 4 | 4 | 5 | 4 | 4 | 4 | 4 | 5 | 5 | 4 | 4 | 5 | 4 |
| Laçi | 1 | 5 | 8 | 8 | 8 | 10 | 9 | 10 | 9 | 9 | 6 | 7 | 6 | 5 | 6 | 6 | 6 | 6 | 6 | 5 | 6 | 6 | 7 | 8 | 8 | 8 | 8 | 6 | 5 | 5 | 4 | 4 | 5 | 6 | 6 | 5 |
| Teuta | 9 | 8 | 9 | 9 | 9 | 9 | 10 | 9 | 10 | 10 | 10 | 10 | 10 | 9 | 10 | 9 | 8 | 7 | 9 | 7 | 7 | 7 | 6 | 6 | 7 | 7 | 7 | 8 | 8 | 6 | 6 | 6 | 6 | 5 | 4 | 6 |
| Kukësi | 6 | 7 | 10 | 10 | 10 | 8 | 8 | 4 | 6 | 7 | 9 | 8 | 8 | 10 | 9 | 10 | 10 | 10 | 8 | 9 | 8 | 9 | 8 | 7 | 6 | 6 | 6 | 7 | 7 | 8 | 8 | 8 | 7 | 7 | 7 | 7 |
| Erzeni | 4 | 4 | 3 | 2 | 2 | 4 | 3 | 3 | 2 | 3 | 4 | 3 | 4 | 4 | 4 | 5 | 4 | 4 | 3 | 4 | 4 | 4 | 5 | 5 | 5 | 4 | 5 | 5 | 6 | 7 | 7 | 7 | 8 | 8 | 8 | 8 |
| Bylis | 2 | 2 | 5 | 3 | 5 | 3 | 4 | 5 | 7 | 8 | 8 | 9 | 9 | 8 | 8 | 8 | 9 | 8 | 7 | 8 | 9 | 8 | 9 | 9 | 9 | 9 | 9 | 9 | 9 | 9 | 9 | 9 | 9 | 9 | 9 | 9 |
| Kastrioti | 10 | 9 | 6 | 7 | 7 | 7 | 7 | 7 | 8 | 6 | 7 | 6 | 7 | 7 | 7 | 7 | 7 | 9 | 10 | 10 | 10 | 10 | 10 | 10 | 10 | 10 | 10 | 10 | 10 | 10 | 10 | 10 | 10 | 10 | 10 | 10 |

| Leader and UEFA Champions League first qualifying round |
| UEFA Europa Conference League first qualifying round |
| Relegation play-off |
| 2023–24 Kategoria e Parë |

=== Relegation play-off ===
4 June 2023
17:00

| Erzeni | 2−1 (a.e.t.) | Korabi |
|---|---|---|
| Sadiki 4'; Mehmeti 93' | | Tabaku 19' |

Niko Dovana Stadium, Durrës
Referee: Eldorjan Hamiti

Both clubs remained in their respective leagues.

== Season statistics ==
=== Scoring ===
==== Top scorers ====
As of 29 May 2023

| Rank | Player | Club | Goals |
|---|---|---|---|
| 1 | (Kosovo) Florent Hasani | Tirana | 16 |
| 2 | (Brazil) Victor da Silva | Partizani | 13 |
| 3 | (Brazil) Patrick Nonato | Erzeni | 12 |
| 4 | (Ghana) Raphael Dwamena | Egnatia | 11 |
| 4 | (Albania) Redon Xhixha | Tirana | 11 |
| 4 | (Mali) Saliou Guindo | Laçi | 11 |
| 7 | (Albania) Xhuliano Skuka | Partizani | 10 |

=== Hat-tricks ===
| Player | Club | Against | Result | Date |
|---|---|---|---|---|
| (Albania) Redon Xhixha | Tirana | Teuta | 4–0 (H) | 16 September 2022 |
| (Albania) Redon Xhixha | Tirana | Laçi | 3–3 (H) | 7 October 2022 |
| (Brazil) Patrick | Tirana | Bylis | 4–1 (H) | 21 January 2023 |
| (Kosovo) Florent Hasani | Tirana | Erzeni | 3–1 (H) | 2 April 2023 |

Notes

(H) – Home team
(A) – Away team

=== Discipline ===
==== Player ====
- Most yellow cards: 12
  - (Albania) Abaz Karakaçi (Kastrioti)
- Most red cards: 2
  - (Albania) Abaz Karakaçi (Kastrioti)
  - (Albania) Xhoeli Maçolli (Bylis)

== Awards ==
=== Monthly awards ===
| Month | Player of the Month | Club | Coach of the Month | Club |
| Month | Player | Club | Coach | Club |
|---|---|---|---|---|
| September | (Albania) Xhuliano Skuka | Partizani | (Albania) Xhevahir Kapllani | Erzeni |
| October | (Albania) Redon Xhixha | Tirana | (Albania) Orges Shehi | Tirana |
| December | (Albania) Tedi Cara | Partizani | (Albania) Shpëtim Duro | Egnatia |
| January | (Albania) Fjoart Jonuzi | Vllaznia | (Albania) Rrahman Hallaçi | Kukësi |
| February | (Albania) Pano Qirko | Teuta | (Albania) Edi Martini | Teuta |
| March | (Ghana) Raphael Dwamena | Egnatia | (Italy) Giovanni Colella | Partizani |
| April | (Kosovo) Florent Hasani | Tirana | (Albania) Orges Shehi | Tirana |
| May | (Albania) Arinaldo Rrapaj | Partizani | (Albania) Edlir Tetova | Egnatia |

=== Annual awards ===
| Award | Winner | Club |
|---|---|---|
| Manager of the Season | (Albania) Orges Shehi | Tirana |
| Player of the Season | (Albania) Arinaldo Rrapaj | Partizani |
| Young Player of the Season | (Albania) Arlind Kurti | Laçi |

Team of the Year
| Goalkeeper | (Albania) Alen Sherri (Egnatia) | | | |
| Defenders | (Albania) Florjan Përgjoni (Tirana) | (North Macedonia) Filip Najdovski (Tirana) | (Albania) Renato Malota (Egnatia) | (Albania) Andi Hadroj (Partizani) |
| Midfielders | (Brazil) Fernando Medeiros (Egnatia) | | (Albania) Albano Aleksi (Egnatia) | (Albania) Arinaldo Rrapaj (Partizani) |
| Forwards | (Kosovo) Florent Hasani (Tirana) | | (Ghana) Raphael Dwamena (Egnatia) | (Albania) Tedi Cara (Partizani) |

== See also ==
- Kategoria Superiore

== Notes and references ==
=== Notes ===
1. Kastrioti will play their 2022–23 home games at the Kamëz Stadium in Kamëz, since their venue, Kastrioti Stadium, is not suitable for Kategoria Superiore matches.
2. Erzeni will play their 2022–23 home games at the Niko Dovana Stadium in Durrës, since their venue, Tofik Jashari Stadium, is not suitable for Kategoria Superiore matches.
