= Bledar =

- Gender: Male
- Language: Albanian

Origin
- Region of origin: Albania

Bledar is an Albanian masculine given name. People bearing the name include:

- Bledar Borova (born 1983), Albanian coach manager
- Bledar Çuçi (born 1970), Albanian politician
- Bledar Devolli (born 1978), Albanian footballer
- Bledar Gjeçaj (born 1970), Albanian basketball player and coach
- Bledar Hajdini (born 1995), Kosovo Albanian professional footballer
- Bledar Hodo (born 1985) Albanian footballer
- Bledar Kola (born 1972), Albanian footballer
- Bledar Mançaku (born 1982), Albanian footballer
- Bledar Marashi (born 1990), Albanian footballer
- Bledar Sejko (born 1972), Albanian guitarist, composer, and singer
- Bledar Sinella (born 1976), Albanian footballer and football club manager
- Bledar Vashaku (born 1981), Albanian footballer
