= Mario Dajsinani =

Albanian footballer (born 1998)

Personal information
- Date of birth: 23 December 1998 (age 27)
- Place of birth: Kavajë, Albania
- Height: 1.97 m (6 ft 6 in)
- Position: Goalkeeper

Team information
- Current team: Egnatia
- Number: 98

Youth career
- 2012–2015: Besa Kavajë
- 2016–2017: Partizani

Senior career*
Years	Team	Apps	(Gls)
2012–2015	Besa	30	(0)
2016–2017	Partizani B	6	(0)
2016–2017	Partizani	0	(0)
2017–2021	Skënderbeu	44	(0)
2017–2018	→ Erzeni (loan)	11	(0)
2021–2024	Laci	108	(0)
2025–	Egnatia	55	(0)

International career^{‡}
2016	Albania U19	1	(0)
2017–2020	Albania U20	1	(0)
2017–2021	Albania U21	2	(0)
2022–	Albania	4	(0)
- * Club domestic league appearances and goals as of 29 October 2026 ‡ National team caps and goals as of 6 October 2026

Mario Dajsinani (born 23 December 1998) is an Albanian professional footballer who plays as a goalkeeper for Albanian club Egnatia and the Albania national team.

== Club career ==
=== Early career ===
Dajsinani made his professional debut for hometown club Besa Kavajë during the 2014–15 season at just the age of 16. He played his first match as a professional on 6 December 2014 in an away match against Veleçiku Koplik, keeping a clean sheet. During this season, he played 17 league matches and slowly developed as a talent within Besa's youth system and was later added to the roster of the U-17 national team. He kept his spot even for the 2015–16 season where he made 13 appearances in the first part of the season before leaving the team in January.

=== Partizani Tirana ===
On 21 January 2016, Dajsinani signed a three-year contract with Partizani Tirana as the team's third choice keeper.

=== Skënderbeu Korçë ===
On 19 June 2017, Dajsinani suddenly joined Skënderbeu Korçë and was included in team's UEFA Europa League squad. His transfer was made official two days later where he signed a four-year contract, his first as a professional. He made his league debut for the club on 19 May 2018 in a 3–1 away loss to Luftëtari Gjirokastër. He was subbed on in the 55th minute for Aldo Teqja.

== International career ==
Dajsinani received his first international call-up at Albania under-19 level by coach Arjan Bellaj for a seven-day gathering in Durrës, Albania from 29 August to 5 September 2015.

He was called up to participate in the 2016 UEFA European Under-19 Championship qualification from 12 to 17 November 2015. However, he was considered as a third choice behind Elhan Kastrati & Gentian Selmani and therefore wasn't included in the 18-man squad which participated in the Group 1 matches.

He then received a call up to the Albania under-19 by same coach Arjan Bellaj for the friendly tournament Roma Caput Mundi from 29 February–4 March 2016.

Dajsinani was called up at Albania national under-21 team by coach Alban Bushi for a gathering in Durrës, Albania from 18 to 25 January 2017.

He received his first call up for the Albania under-20 side by same coach of the under-21 team Alban Bushi for the friendly match against Georgia on 14 November 2017. He debuted for under-20 team against Georgia by playing as a starter for 75 minutes in a 3–0 loss, where all 3 goals were conceded with him at goalie.

== Career statistics ==
=== Club ===
As of match played 5 November 2026

Appearances and goals by club, season and competition
Club	Season	League			Albanian Cup		Europe		Other		Total	
Club	Season	Division	Apps	Goals	Apps	Goals	Apps	Goals	Apps	Goals	Apps	Goals
Besa Kavajë	2014–15	Albanian First Division	17	0	1	0	—		—		18	0
Besa Kavajë	2015–16	Albanian First Division	13	0	—		—		—		13	0
Besa Kavajë	Total		30	0	1	0	—		—		31	0
Partizani Tirana B	2015–16	Albanian Superliga	3	0	—		—		—		3	0
Partizani Tirana B	2016–17	Albanian Superliga	3	0	—		—		—		3	0
Partizani Tirana B	Total		6	0	—		—		—		6	0
Partizani Tirana	2015–16	Albanian Superliga	0	0	—		—		—		0	0
Partizani Tirana	2016–17	Albanian Superliga	0	0	1	0	0	0	—		1	0
Partizani Tirana	Total		0	0	1	0	0	0	—		1	0
Skënderbeu Korçë	2017–18	Albanian Superliga	1	0	0	0	0	0	—		1	0
Skënderbeu Korçë	2018–19	Albanian Superliga	11	0	5	0	—		0	0	16	0
Skënderbeu Korçë	2019–20	Albanian Superliga	1	0	6	0	—		—		7	0
Skënderbeu Korçë	2020–21	Albanian Superliga	30	0	2	0	—		—		32	0
Skënderbeu Korçë	Total		43	0	13	0	0	0	0	0	56	0
Erzeni Shijak (loan)	2017–18	Albanian First Division	11	0	1	0	—		—		12	0
Laçi	2021–22	Kategoria Superiore	33	0	6	0	0	0	—		39	0
Laçi	2022–23	Kategoria Superiore	20	0	2	0	4 (Note: Appearances in UEFA Europa Conference League)	0	0	0	26	0
Laçi	2023–24	Kategoria Superiore	36	0	3	0	—		1 (Note: Appearance in Kategoria Superiore promotion/relegation play-offs)	0	40	0
Laçi	2024–25	Kategoria Superiore	19	0	—		—		—		19	0
Laçi	Total		108	0	11	0	4	0	1	0	124	0
Egnatia	2024–25	Kategoria Superiore	18	0	6	0	—		—		24	0
Egnatia	2025–26	Kategoria Superiore	31	0	0	0	6 (Note: Two appearances in UEFA Champions League, four appearances in UEFA Conference League)	0	1	0	38	0
Egnatia	2026–27	Kategoria Superiore	6	0	0	0	11 (Note: Four appearances in UEFA Champions League, four appearances in UEFA Europa League and three appearances in Conference League)	0	—		17	0
Egnatia	Total		55	0	6	0	17	0	1	0	79	0
Career total			243	0	33	0	21	0	2	0	309	0

=== International ===
As of match played 6 October 2026

Appearances and goals by national team and year
National team	Year	Apps	Goals
Albania
Albania	2022	1	0
Albania	2023	0	0
Albania	2024	0	0
Albania	2025	2	0
Albania	2026	1	0
Total		4	0
