= Partizani Channel =

Albanian football club television channel

- Country: Albania
- Headquarters: Tirana, Albania

Programming
- Language: Albanian
- Picture format: 16:9

Ownership
- Owner: FK Partizani Tirana

History
- Launched: November 2022

Links
- Website: tv.partizani.al

Partizani Channel is an Albanian sports television channel dedicated to the football club FK Partizani Tirana. The channel was launched in November 2022 as an initiative of the club's president, Gazment Demi, in cooperation with media company Tibo Media Partner and its president, Adnand Mahmuti. It is the first television channel in Albania exclusively dedicated to a football club.

The channel is available on the Tibo platform on channel 216 and broadcasts a variety of club-related content. Programming includes live and archived matches, interviews with current players and staff, features on former club legends, and coverage of youth and women's teams. The channel provides continuous coverage of activities related to FK Partizani.
