= Levan Tandilashvili =

Georgian association football player

Personal information
- Date of birth: 27 February 2003 (age 23)
- Place of birth: Lapankuri, Kakheti, Georgia
- Position: Goalkeeper

Team information
- Current team: KF Egnatia
- Number: 1

Youth career
- Telavi

Senior career*
| Years | Team | Apps | (Gls) |
| 2020–2026 | Telavi | 93 | (0) |
| 2023 | → Locomotive (loan) | 15 | (0) |
| 2026– | KF Egnatia | 6 | (0) |

International career^{‡}
| 2021–2022 | Georgia U19 | 5 | (0) |
| 2023 | Georgia U21 | 2 | (0) |
- * Club domestic league appearances and goals as of 24 May 2026 ‡ National team caps and goals as of 28 February 2026

Levan Tandilashvili (Georgian: ლევან თანდილაშვილი, born 27 February 2003) is a Georgian footballer who plays as a goalkeeper for Kategoria Superiore club KF Egnatia.

Tandilashvili has been a member of national youth teams.

== Club career ==
Levan Tandilashvili started his professional career at Telavi. He made his first Erovnuli Liga appearance at the age of 17 in a goalless draw against Dila on 13 September 2020.

In 2022, Tandilashvili was three times named by the Lelo sport newspaper in symbolic league teams and hailed as a promising player despite featuring in nine games only.

In the initial three years, Tandilashvili was mostly used as a reserve goalkeeper. In order to get more playing time, he signed a six-month loan deal with 2nd division club Locomotive in 2023 and helped them retain their league spot in a 7–4 aggregate play-off victory over Rustavi.

Rustavi sustained another defeat a year later, this time in 1/2 league play-offs with Tandilashvili in goal back for Telavi. As his appearances steadily increased, some media outlets characterized him as one of the best Erovnuli Liga goalkeepers by the end of 2024.

In early February 2026, Tandilashvili signed a three-year contract with the reigning Albanian champions KF Egnatia.

== International career ==
Tandilashvili was called up to national youth teams. As a U19 player, he featured in a friendly tie against Azerbaijan before taking part in both first and elite rounds of the 2022 UEFA European Under-19 Championship qualification campaign.

In the same year, Tandilashvili joined U21s for friendlies against Israel and Ukraine, although did not make his debut for the team until 6 June 2024 when he came on the pitch as a half-time substitute against Kazakhstan. Tandilashvili was a regular squad member of a U21 team which secured its first qualification for a major international tournament.

== Statistics ==
As of match played 23 May 2026

Appearances and goals by club, season and competition
| Club | Season | League | | | National cup | | Continental | | Other | | Total | |
| Club | Season | Division | Apps | Goals | Apps | Goals | Apps | Goals | Apps | Goals | Apps | Goals |
|---|---|---|---|---|---|---|---|---|---|---|---|---|
| Telavi | 2020 | Erovnuli Liga | 3 | 0 | 2 | 0 | – | | – | | 5 | 0 |
| Telavi | 2021 | Erovnuli Liga | 5 | 0 | 1 | 0 | – | | – | | 6 | 0 |
| Telavi | 2022 | Erovnuli Liga | 9 | 0 | – | | – | | – | | 9 | 0 |
| Telavi | 2023 | Erovnuli Liga | 14 | 0 | – | | – | | – | | 14 | 0 |
| Telavi | 2024 | Erovnuli Liga | 20 | 0 | 2 | 0 | – | | 2 (Note: Appearances in Erovnuli Liga playoffs) | 0 | 24 | 0 |
| Telavi | 2025 | Erovnuli Liga | 18 | 0 | – | | – | | – | | 18 | 0 |
| Telavi | Total | | 69 | 0 | 5 | 0 | 0 | 0 | 2 | 0 | 76 | 0 |
| Locomotive (loan) | 2023 | Erovnuli Liga 2 | 15 | 0 | 2 | 0 | – | | 2 (Note: Appearances in Liga 2/3 playoffs) | 0 | 19 | 0 |
| KF Egnatia | 2025–26 | Kategoria Superiore | 6 | 0 | 5 | 0 | – | | – | | 11 | 0 |
| Career total | | | 84 | 0 | 12 | 0 | 0 | 0 | 4 | 0 | 100 | 0 |
