= Soumaila Bakayoko (footballer) =

Ivorian footballer

Personal information
- Full name: Soumaila Bakayoko
- Date of birth: 26 October 2001 (age 25)
- Place of birth: Ivory Coast
- Height: 1.85 m (6 ft 1 in)
- Position: Forward

Team information
- Current team: Egnatia
- Number: 11

Senior career*
Years	Team	Apps	(Gls)
2018–2019	Stade d'Abidjan		
2019–2021	SOL FC		
2021	Anwar Al-Abyar		
2021–2022	Al-Hilal Benghazi		
2022–2024	Neuchâtel Xamax	53	(8)
2024–	Egnatia	56	(13)

International career
- Ivory Coast U20
- * Club domestic league appearances and goals as of 25 June 2026

Soumaila Bakayoko (born 26 October 2001) is an Ivorian professional footballer who plays as a forward for Albanian club Egnatia in the Kategoria Superiore.

== Career statistics ==
=== Club ===
As of 31 July 2024

Club	Season	League			Cup		Continental		Other		Total	
Club	Season	Division	Apps	Goals	Apps	Goals	Apps	Goals	Apps	Goals	Apps	Goals
Egnatia	2022–23	Kategoria Superiore	6	0	3	0	—		—		9	0
Egnatia	2023–24	Kategoria Superiore	0	0	0	0	—		—		0	0
Egnatia	Total	Kategoria Superiore	6	0	3	0	0	0	0	0	9	0
Egnatia U21	2022–23	Kategoria Superiore U-21	17	15	—		—		—		17	15
Egnatia U21	2023–24	Kategoria Superiore U-21	2	0	—		—		—		2	0
Egnatia U21	Total		19	15	0	0	0	0	0	0	19	15
Career Total			97	45	7	7	-	-	0	0	104	52

Egnatia

- Albanian Superliga (1): 2024-25
- Albanian Cup (1): 2023–24
  - Runner-up: 2024–25
- Albanian Supercup (1): 2024
