= KF Tirana–Partizani Tirana rivalry =

Football rivalry in Albania

The Big Derby
- Entrance of both teams in a League match
- Other names: KF Tirana vs Partizani
- Location: Tirana, Albania
- Teams: KF Tirana, Partizani
- First meeting: Partizani 8-0 KF Tirana
- Latest meeting: FK Partizani 1–3 KF Tirana; Kategoria Superiore (Round 6: 11 October 2026)
- Stadiums: Selman Stërmasi Stadium; Arena Kombëtare

Statistics
- Total meetings: 213 matches
- Most wins: Partizani (84) +21 Wins
- Top scorer: Refik Resmja (14)
- Largest victory: Partizani 8-0 KF Tirana; KF Tirana 7-3 Partizani

Historically the rivalry between KF Tirana and Partizani Tirana football clubs, the two biggest in Tirana the capital of Albania, has been followed by many football fans and much spectacle either on the pitch, or on stands between Tirona Fanatics and Ultras Guerrils.Matches between these two teams have a long history and have almost always made the first page news in the country. Between years 2008-13, following Partizani's relegation, and also during 2017-18 season with Tirana's relegation to a lower division, the derby faded away for a while until its return during the 2018–19 season.

KF Partizani have a historical advantage of 25 wins in the League but KF Tirana still remains the best club in Albania based on 29 league titles won from them. However, Tirana has a superior record overall in the last 30 seasons and lead in the overall cup statistics with two more ties won.

Supporters of both teams are mainly local people of the city, however traditionally KF Tirana is considered a middle and upper class club supported by the downtown, with right-wing political tendencies, whereas Partizani is traditionally associated with the working class support from the suburbs, with left-wing political tendencies. Both teams have a great deal of supporters from other cities of Albania, as well as worldwide.

== Win–loss totals ==
=== Albanian Superior League ===
Competition	Played	Tirana	Draw	Partizani	Tirana Goals	Partizani Goals	Goals Difference
Albanian Superior League	185	51	58	76	209	250	-41

=== Albanian Cup ===
Competition	Played	Tirana	Draw	Partizani	Tirana Goals	Partizani Goals	Tirana ties won	Partizani ties won
Albanian Cup	28	13	7	8	28	25	9	7

=== League & Cup total ===
Competition	Played	Tirana	Draw	Partizani	Tirana Goals	Partizani Goals	Goals Difference
League & Cup	213	64	65	84	237	275	-38

== All matches ==
Tirana win Draw Partizani win

=== Kategoria Superiore ===
Season	Date	Home	Away	Result	Goals (Home)	Goals (Away)
1947		Tirana	Partizani	2–4	—N/a	
1947		Partizani	Tirana	8–0	—N/a	
1948		Tirana	Partizani	1–2	—N/a	
1948		Partizani	Tirana	4–1	—N/a	
1949		Partizani	Tirana	1–0	—N/a	
1949		Tirana	Partizani	1–3	—N/a	
1950		Partizani	Tirana	6–0	—N/a	
1951		Tirana	Partizani	0–4	—N/a	
1951		Partizani	Tirana	6–0	—N/a	
1952		Tirana	Partizani	0–3	—N/a	
1952		Partizani	Tirana	2–1	—N/a	
1953		Tirana	Partizani	0–1	—N/a	
1953		Partizani	Tirana	2–1	—N/a	
1954		Tirana	Partizani	1–2	—N/a	
1954		Partizani	Tirana	1–0	—N/a	
1955		Partizani	Tirana	3–1	—N/a	
1955		Tirana	Partizani	0–3	—N/a	
1956		Tirana	Partizani	0–2	—N/a	
1956		Partizani	Tirana	2–1	—N/a	
1957		Tirana	Partizani	0–0	—N/a	
1957		Partizani	Tirana	2–1	—N/a	
1958		Partizani	Tirana	4–2	—N/a	
1958		Tirana	Partizani	2–2	—N/a	
1959		Partizani	Tirana	2–2	—N/a	
1959		Tirana	Partizani	0–0	—N/a	
1960		Tirana	Partizani	1–2	—N/a	
1960		Partizani	Tirana	2–2	—N/a	
1961		Tirana	Partizani	2–2	—N/a	
1961		Partizani	Tirana	2–2	—N/a	
1962–63		Tirana	Partizani	0–4	—N/a	
1962–63		Partizani	Tirana	4–0	—N/a	
1963–64		Tirana	Partizani	2–2	—N/a	
1963–64		Partizani	Tirana	0–0	—N/a	
1964–65		Partizani	Tirana	2–0	—N/a	
1964–65		Tirana	Partizani	0–1	—N/a	
1965–66		Partizani	Tirana	1–2	—N/a	
1965–66		Tirana	Partizani	0–1	—N/a	
1966–67		Tirana	Partizani	2–0	—N/a	
1966–67		Partizani	Tirana	1–2^{1}	—N/a	
1968		Tirana	Partizani	2–0	—N/a	
1968		Partizani	Tirana	1–1	—N/a	
1969–70		Tirana	Partizani	0–0	—N/a	
1969–70		Partizani	Tirana	1–1	—N/a	
1970–71		Partizani	Tirana	2–1	—N/a	
1970–71		Tirana	Partizani	1–1	—N/a	
1971–72		Tirana	Partizani	4–2	—N/a	
1971–72		Partizani	Tirana	2–1	—N/a	
1972–73		Tirana	Partizani	2–0	—N/a	
1972–73		Partizani	Tirana	1–1	—N/a	
1973–74		Tirana	Partizani	1–1	—N/a	
1973–74		Partizani	Tirana	3–0	—N/a	
1974–75		Tirana	Partizani	2–1	—N/a	
1974–75		Partizani	Tirana	0–0	—N/a	
1975–76		Partizani	Tirana	2–0	—N/a	
1975–76		Tirana	Partizani	2–3	—N/a	
1976–77		Tirana	Partizani	3–1	—N/a	
1976–77		Partizani	Tirana	2–0	—N/a	
1976–77		Tirana	Partizani	0–0	—N/a	
1976–77		Partizani	Tirana	0–2	—N/a	
1977–78		Tirana	Partizani	1–0	—N/a	
1977–78		Partizani	Tirana	3–1	—N/a	
1978–79		Partizani	Tirana	1–0	—N/a	
1978–79		Tirana	Partizani	2–2	—N/a	
1979–80		Partizani	Tirana	2–3	—N/a	
1979–80		Tirana	Partizani	1–1	—N/a	
1980–81	28 December 1980	Tirana	Partizani	2–3	—N/a	
1980–81	24 May 1981	Partizani	Tirana	1–2	—N/a	
1981–82	24 September 1981	Tirana	Partizani	0–0	—N/a	
1981–82	21 February 1982	Partizani	Tirana	1–1	—N/a	
1982–83	3 November 1982	Tirana	Partizani	0–1	—N/a	
1982–83	10 April 1983	Partizani	Tirana	1–0	—N/a	
1983–84	11 December 1983	Tirana	Partizani	1–1	—N/a	
1983–84	20 May 1984	Partizani	Tirana	0–0	—N/a	
1984–85	23 September 1984	Partizani	Tirana	1–2	—N/a	
1984–85	17 March 1985	Tirana	Partizani	1–1	—N/a	
1985–86	22 September 1985	Partizani	Tirana	3–7	—N/a	
1985–86	9 March 1986	Tirana	Partizani	1–2	—N/a	
1986–87	23 November 1986	Tirana	Partizani	1–1	—N/a	
1986–87	10 May 1987	Partizani	Tirana	0–0	—N/a	
1987–88	30 August 1987	Tirana	Partizani	3–1	—N/a	
1987–88	13 December 1987	Partizani	Tirana	1–1	—N/a	
1988–89	21 August 1988	Tirana	Partizani	0–2	—N/a	
1988–89	27 November 1988	Partizani	Tirana	3–2	—N/a	
1988–89	1 May 1989	Tirana	Partizani	1–1	—N/a	
1988–89	4 June 1989	Partizani	Tirana	1–1	—N/a	
1989–90	19 November 1989	Tirana	Partizani	1–0	—N/a	
1989–90	4 March 1990	Partizani	Tirana	2–0	—N/a	
1989–90	13 May 1990	Tirana	Partizani	0–1	—N/a	
1990–91	27 October 1990	Tirana	Partizani	2–3	—N/a	
1990–91	27 January 1991	Partizani	Tirana	1–0	—N/a	
1990–91	13 June 1991	Tirana	Partizani	2–1	—N/a	
1991–92	8 December 1991	Tirana	Partizani	2–1	—N/a	
1991–92	3 May 1992	Partizani	Tirana	1–3	—N/a	
1992–93	30 September 1992	Partizani	Tirana	2–1	—N/a	
1992–93	7 March 1993	Tirana	Partizani	0–1	—N/a	
1993–94	4 September 1993	Partizani	Tirana	1–0	—N/a	
1993–94	5 February 1994	Tirana	Partizani	2–1	—N/a	
1994–95	3 December 1994	Tirana	Partizani	1–0	—N/a	
1994–95	13 May 1995	Partizani	Tirana	2–1	—N/a	
1995–96	16 September 1995	Tirana	Partizani	1–2	—N/a	
1995–96	24 February 1996	Partizani	Tirana	0–2	—N/a	
1996–97	3 November 1996	Tirana	Partizani	2–2	—N/a	
1996–97	10 August 1997	Tirana	Partizani	1–0	—N/a	
1997–98	7 November 1997	Tirana	Partizani	1–0	—N/a	
1997–98	18 April 1998	Partizani	Tirana	0–0	—N/a	
1998–99	29 August 1998	Tirana	Partizani	2–2	—N/a	
1998–99	6 February 1999	Partizani	Tirana	1–2	—N/a	
1999–2000	6 November 1999	Partizani	Tirana	0–0		
1999–2000	31 March 2000	Tirana	Partizani	3–0	Ymeri, Vito, Mema	
2001–02	3 November 2001	Partizani	Tirana	0–0		
2001–02	14 April 2002	Tirana	Partizani	2–0	Fortuzi (2)	
2002–03	23 November 2002	Tirana	Partizani	0–2		Ativie, Tawata
2002–03	3 May 2003	Partizani	Tirana	1–3	Allmuça	M. Halili (3)
2003–04	4 October 2003	Partizani	Tirana	3–1	Duro, Muzaka, Carioca	M. Halili
2003–04	6 December 2003	Tirana	Partizani	1–0	Muka	
2003–04	6 March 2004	Partizani	Tirana	0–1		Fortuzi
2003–04	5 May 2004	Tirana	Partizani	0–0		
2004–05	2 October 2004	Partizani	Tirana	2–5	Ndreka, Junior	Patushi, Fortuzi (2), Muka (2)
2004–05	11 December 2004	Tirana	Partizani	3–3	Patushi, Fortuzi, Muka	Junior, Bylykbashi, Bernardo
2004–05	19 February 2005	Partizani	Tirana	0–1		Muka
2004–05	30 April 2005	Tirana	Partizani	4–0	Agolli, Xhafa, Rraklli, Patushi	
2005–06	29 October 2005	Tirana	Partizani	1–0	Muka	
2005–06	22 December 2005	Partizani	Tirana	1–0	Abilaliaj	
2005–06	19 March 2006	Tirana	Partizani	1–0	Salihi	
2005–06	13 May 2006	Partizani	Tirana	2–2	Bakaj, Rodrigo	Salihi, Dabulla
2006–07	30 September 2006	Partizani	Tirana	0–2		Salihi (2)
2006–07	17 December 2006	Tirana	Partizani	3–2	Sinani, Salihi, Duro	Bylykbashi, Dhembi
2006–07	9 May 2007	Tirana	Partizani	1–0	Çapja	
2007–08	10 November 2007	Partizani	Tirana	0–0		
2007–08	1 March 2008	Tirana	Partizani	1–4	Fortuzi	Osmani, Devolli, Shkëmbi, Abilaliaj
2007–08	26 April 2008	Partizani	Tirana	2–1	Dhembi, Bakaj	Xhafaj
2008–09	14 September 2008	Tirana	Partizani	2–1	Xhafaj, Lila	Breno
2008–09	7 December 2008	Partizani	Tirana	2–2	Karabeci, Ngjela	Sefa, Memelli
2008–09	18 April 2009	Partizani	Tirana	2–2	Babamusta, Ngjela	Xhafaj (2)
2013–14	12 October 2013	Partizani	Tirana	1–0	Demiri	
2013–14	7 February 2014	Tirana	Partizani	1–0	Gilberto	
2013–14	22 March 2014	Partizani	Tirana	1–1	Nexhipi	Morina
2014–15	26 September 2014	Tirana	Partizani	0–0		
2014–15	8 December 2014	Partizani	Tirana	2–0	Nexhipi, Mazrekaj	
2014–15	13 March 2015	Tirana	Partizani	1–2	Morina	Nexhipi, Račić
2014–15	4 May 2015	Partizani	Tirana	2–2	Fazliu, Mazrekaj	Bakaj (2)
2015–16	3 October 2015	Partizani	Tirana	1–0	Sukaj	
2015–16	7 December 2015	Tirana	Partizani	0–0		
2015–16	4 March 2016	Partizani	Tirana	2–0	Sukaj, Fejzullahu	
2015–16	4 May 2016	Tirana	Partizani	2–2	Muça, Bakaj	Sukaj, Fili
2016–17	25 September 2016	Partizani	Tirana	0–0		
2016–17	2 December 2016	Tirana	Partizani	0–0		
2016–17	20 February 2017	Partizani	Tirana	2–1	Malota, Ekuban	Teqja
2016–17	28 April 2017	Tirana	Partizani	1–2	Edeh	Batha, Sukaj
2018–19	28 September 2018	Tirana	Partizani	0–1		Mala
2018–19	30 November 2018	Partizani	Tirana	2–1	Hebaj (2)	G. Halili
2018–19	1 March 2019	Tirana	Partizani	0–0		
2018–19	12 May 2019	Partizani	Tirana	2–1	Çinari (2)	Greca
2019–20	29 September 2019	Tirana	Partizani	1–2	E. Hasani	William, Solomon
2019–20	13 December 2019	Partizani	Tirana	1–2	Bardhi	Batha, Cobbinah
2019–20	28 February 2020	Tirana	Partizani	5–1	Batha (2), Idrizaj (o.g.), Muçi (2)	William
2019–20	10 July 2020^{2}	Partizani	Tirana	1–1	William	Muçi
2020–21	4 December 2020	Tirana	Partizani	0–0		
2020–21	21 January 2021	Partizani	Tirana	1–0	Çinari	
2020–21	13 March 2021	Tirana	Partizani	1–2	Hoxhallari	Belica, Bardhi
2020–21	13 May 2021	Partizani	Tirana	0–0		
2021–22	25 October 2021	Tirana	Partizani	1–0	Limaj	
2021–22	23 December 2021	Partizani	Tirana	1–2	Júnior	Përgjoni, Xhixha
2021–22	5 March 2022	Tirana	Partizani	0–0		
2021–22	7 May 2022	Partizani	Tirana	1–2	Skuka	Seferi, Totre
2022–23	2 October 2022	Partizani	Tirana	0–2		Xhixha (2)
2022–23	21 December 2022	Tirana	Partizani	0–1		Skuka
2022–23	6 March 2023	Partizani	Tirana	2–0	Mba, Cara	
2022–23	17 May 2023	Tirana	Partizani	1–1	Deliu	Victor
2023–24	19 October 2023	Partizani	Tirana	2–1	Gueye, Keko	F. Hasani
2023–24	3 December 2023	Tirana	Partizani	1–1	F. Hasani	Keko
2023–24	16 February 2024	Partizani	Tirana	2–1	Skuka, Cara	Latifi
2023–24	28 April 2024	Tirana	Partizani	1–2	Abazaj	Gueye (2)
2024–25	21 September 2024	Partizani	Tirana	0–0		
2024–25	1 December 2024	Tirana	Partizani	0–0		
2024–25	9 February 2025	Partizani	Tirana	1–1	Sembene	Ernest
2024–25	7 April 2025	Tirana	Partizani	3–0	Jarmouni (2), Ernest	
2025–26	3 October 2025	Partizani	Tirana	0–3		Falaye, Patsatsia, Tabekou
2025–26	7 December 2025	Tirana	Partizani	0–2		Human, Skuka
2025–26	15 February 2026	Partizani	Tirana	2–0	Sibide JR, Isgandarli	
2025–26	26 April 2026	Tirana	Partizani	2–1	Krešić, Álvarez	Human
2026–27	11 October 2026	Partizani	Tirana	1–3	Himallari	Xhixha, Ilievski, Kiš
2026–27	6 December 2026	Tirana	Partizani			

^{1}In the 19th week match 17 Nëntori - Partizani played on the pitch ended 2:1. Teams were both awarded 0-3 loss on that match, a decision of AFA.
^{2}The 33rd week match was originally scheduled for the 2 May 2020, but was the postponed to 10 July as the championship of the 2019-20 season was then suspended, due to a pandemic of COVID-19 in Albania.

== League placements ==
The league placement table shows the results of KF Tirana and Partizani Tirana, when they played in Kategoria Superiore.

P.	47	48	49	50	51	52	53	54	55	56	57	58	59	60	61	63	64	65	66	67	68	70	71	72	73	74	75	76	77	78	79	80	81	82	83	84	85	86	87	88	89	90	91	92	93	94
1	1	1	1					1			1	1	1		1	1	1	1	1		1	1	1								1		1	1			1		1	1	1				1	
2				2	2	2	2		2	2				2				2	2	2	2	2		2	2	2		2			2	2			2	2					2	2	2	2		2
3					3		3	3	3	3		3	3	3	3									3			3			3			3		3	3		3								
4			4								4					4											4		4			4		4			4					4	4			
5	5					5														5								5	5									5								5
6		6														6														6									6							
7																							7																							
8																																												8		
9				9																																				9						
10																																														
11																									11																				11	
12																																														
13																										13																				
14																																														
15																																														
16																																														

P.	95	96	97	98	99	00	01	02	03	04	05	06	07	08	09	10	11	12	13	14	15	16	17	18	19	20	21	22	23	24	25
1	1	1	1		1	1			1	1	1		1		1										1	1		1	1		
2				2			2	2				2		2								2	2						2	2	
3	3	3		3				3	3							3		3			3						3	3			3
4			4							4		4	4								4										
5																	5		5	5		5		5			5			5	
6														6						6						6					
7																									7						
8											8																				8
9																							9								
10					10										10																
11																															
12																															
13																															
14						14																									
15																															
16																															

• Total: Partizani 42 times higher, KF Tirana 34 times higher.

== Top goalscorers ==
Nat	Player	Club(s)	Total
(Albania)	Refik Resmja	Partizani Tirana	14
(Albania)	Indrit Fortuzi	KF Tirana	11
(Albania)	Agim Murati	Partizani Tirana	11
(Albania)	Agustin Kola	KF Tirana	10
(Albania)	Robert Jashari	Partizani Tirana	9
(Albania)	Arben Minga	KF Tirana	8
(Albania)	Kolec Kraja	Partizani Tirana	8
(Albania)	Petrit Dibra	KF Tirana	7
(Albania)	Panajot Pano	Partizani Tirana	7
(Albania)	Devi Muka	KF Tirana	7

== See also ==
- Oldest Albanian derby
- Tirana derbies
- Dinamo Tirana–KF Tirana rivalry
