= Arinaldo Rrapaj =

Albanian footballer

Personal information
- Date of birth: 9 August 2001 (age 25)
- Place of birth: Kavajë, Albania
- Height: 1.74 m (5 ft 9 in)
- Position: Midfielder

Team information
- Current team: Kolos Kovalivka
- Number: 99

Youth career
- 2012–2019: Flamurtari Vlorë

Senior career*
Years	Team	Apps	(Gls)
2018–2020	Flamurtari Vlorë	53	(0)
2020–2021	Skënderbeu Korçë	30	(0)
2021–2025	Partizani Tirana	116	(19)
2025–	Kolos Kovalivka	33	(3)

International career^{‡}
2019	Albania U19	5	(0)
2021–2022	Albania U21	4	(0)
2022–	Albania	2	(0)
- * Club domestic league appearances and goals as of 3 June 2026 ‡ National team caps and goals as of 22:40, 11 November 2022 (UTC)

Arinaldo Rrapaj (born 9 August 2001) is an Albanian footballer who plays as a midfielder for Kolos Kovalivka and the Albania national team.

== Career ==
=== Flamurtari ===
A graduate of the club's youth academy, Rrapaj made his Albanian Superliga debut on 19 May 2018, playing the entirety of a 2–1 home defeat to Partizani Tirana.

=== Partizani Tirana ===
Rrapaj spent the 2020–21 season with Skënderbeu, making 30 league appearances for the club. In June 2021, he joined Partizani Tirana, signing a three-year deal with an optional extension for a fourth year.

== Career statistics ==
=== Club ===
As of 9 January 2024

Club	Season	League			Cup		Continental		Other		Total	
Club	Season	Division	Apps	Goals	Apps	Goals	Apps	Goals	Apps	Goals	Apps	Goals
Flamurtari	2017–18	Kategoria Superiore	1	0	1	0	—				2	0
Flamurtari	2018–19	Kategoria Superiore	18	0	4	0	—				22	0
Flamurtari	2019–20	Kategoria Superiore	34	0	2	0	—				36	0
Flamurtari	Total		53	0	7	0	—				60	0
Skënderbeu	2020–21	Kategoria Superiore	30	0	2	0	—				32	0
Skënderbeu	Total		30	0	2	0	—				32	0
Partizani	2021–22	Kategoria Superiore	32	6	6	1	4	0	—		2	0
Partizani	2022–23	Kategoria Superiore	34	6	4	0	2	0	—		2	0
Partizani	2023–24	Kategoria Superiore	34	2	2	0	8	2	1	0	36	0
Partizani	2024–25	Kategoria Superiore	16	5	0	0	3	0	—		36	0
Partizani	Total		116	19	12	1	17	2	1	0	146	22
Career total			199	19	21	1	17	2	1	0	238	22
