= 2024–25 Kategoria Superiore =

Kategoria Superiore
- Season: 2024–25
- Dates: 18 August 2024 – 12 May 2025
- Champions: Egnatia; 2nd title
- Relegated: Skënderbeu; Laçi
- Champions League: Egnatia
- Conference League: Vllaznia; Partizani; Dinamo City
- Matches: 184
- Goals: 409 (2.22 per match)
- Top goalscorer: Bekim Balaj (19 goals)
- Biggest home win: Bylis 4–0 Teuta (25 October 2024); Egnatia 4–0 Bylis (15 September 2024); Tirana 4–0 Bylis (10 November 2024)
- Biggest away win: Elbasani 0–5 Dinamo City (4 November 2024)
- Highest scoring: Tirana 3–4 Vllaznia (30 October 2024)
- Longest winning run: 6 matches Egnatia
- Longest unbeaten run: 15 matches Partizani
- Longest winless run: 12 matches Skënderbeu
- Longest losing run: 5 matches Bylis; Dinamo City
- All statistics correct as of 12 May 2025.

The 2024–25 Kategoria Superiore was the 86th official season, or 89th season of top-tier football in Albania (including three unofficial championships during World War II) and the 25th season under the name Kategoria Superiore. The season began on 18 August 2024 and ended on 12 May 2025. Egnatia won the league title on 12 May 2025, beating Vllaznia in the final match.

The winners of this season's Kategoria Superiore earned a place in the first qualifying round of the 2025–26 Champions League, with the second and third placed clubs earning a place in the first qualifying round of the 2025–26 Conference League.

== Teams ==
Two clubs have earned promotion from the Kategoria e Parë, Bylis (promoted after a one-year absence) and Elbasani (promoted for the first time in their history). Erzeni (relegated after two years in the top flight) and Kukësi (relegated after twelve years in the top flight) were relegated to Kategoria e Parë at the conclusion of last season.

=== Locations ===
2024–25 Kategoria Superiore teams.

Team	Home city	Stadium	Capacity	2023–24 season
Bylis	Ballsh	Adush Muçaj Stadium	2,464	Runner-up (Kategoria e Parë)
Dinamo City	Tirana	Elbasan Arena	12,800	7th
Egnatia	Rrogozhinë	Egnatia Arena	4,000	Champion
Elbasani	Elbasan	Elbasan Arena	12,800	Champion (Kategoria e Parë)
Laçi	Laç	Laçi Stadium	2,271	8th
Partizani	Tirana	Arena e Demave	4,500	2nd
Skënderbeu	Korçë	Skënderbeu Stadium	5,800	3rd
Teuta	Durrës	Niko Dovana Stadium	12,040	6th
Tirana	Tirana	Various		5th
Vllaznia	Shkodër	Loro Boriçi Stadium	16,022	4th

=== Stadiums ===
Bylis	Dinamo City	Egnatia	Elbasani	Laçi
Adush Muçaj Stadium	Elbasan Arena; UEFA stadium category	Egnatia Arena	Elbasan Arena; UEFA stadium category	Laçi Stadium
Capacity: 2,464	Capacity: 12,800	Capacity: 4,000	Capacity: 12,800	Capacity: 2,271
Partizani	Skënderbeu	Teuta	Tirana	Vllaznia
Arena e Demave	Skënderbeu Stadium	Niko Dovana Stadium		Loro Boriçi Stadium; UEFA stadium category
Capacity: 4,500	Capacity: 5,800	Capacity: 12,040		Capacity: 16,022

=== Personnel and kits ===
Note: Flags indicate national team as has been defined under FIFA eligibility rules. Players and Managers may hold more than one non-FIFA nationality.

Team	President	Manager	Captain	Kit manufacturer	Shirt sponsor
Bylis	(Albania) Besnik Kapllanaj	(Albania) Gentian Mezani	(Albania) Marin Abazaj	Macron	
Dinamo City	(Albania) Ardian Bardhi	(Albania) Ilir Daja	(Albania) Bruno Dita	Kappa	Durrës Yachts & Marina
Egnatia	(Albania) Agim Demrozi	(Albania) Edlir Tetova	(Albania) Renato Malota	Joma	Demrozi Construction
Elbasani	(Albania) Kujtim Llupa	(Serbia) Ivan Gvozdenović	(Albania) Orgest Gava	Cohl's	Kurum
Laçi	(Albania) Pashk Laska	(Italy) Francesco Moriero	(Albania) Kleandro Lleshi	Uhlsport	
Partizani	(Albania) Gazmend Demi	(Albania) Skënder Gega	(Albania) Alban Hoxha	Joma	
Skënderbeu	(Albania) Ardjan Takaj	(Albania) Ernest Gjoka	(Albania) Elvis Prençi	Uhlsport	ABI Bank
Teuta	(Albania) Edmond Hasanbelliu	(Albania) Bledar Hodo	(Albania) Blerim Kotobelli	Macron	
Tirana	(Albania) Refik Halili	(Albania) Bledi Shkëmbi	(Albania) Florjan Përgjoni	Joma	
Vllaznia	(Albania) Alban Xhaferi	(Germany) Thomas Brdarić	(Albania) Bekim Balaj	Suzmar	AL Invest

=== Managerial changes ===
Team	Outgoing manager	Manner of departure	Date of vacancy	Position in table	Incoming manager	Date of appointment
Bylis	(Albania) Arjan Bellaj	Signed by Vora	24 May 2024	Pre-season	(Nigeria) Ndubuisi Egbo	3 July 2024
Tirana	(Albania) Erbim Fagu	Mutual consent	24 May 2024	Pre-season	(Albania) Bledi Shkëmbi	5 June 2024
Elbasani	(Albania) Nevil Dede	Mutual consent	1 July 2024	Pre-season	(Italy) Roberto Bordin	11 July 2024
Partizani	(Albania) Orges Shehi	Mutual consent	5 August 2024	Pre-season	(Albania) Arbër Abilaliaj	5 August 2024
Partizani	(Albania) Arbër Abilaliaj	End of caretaker spell	26 August 2024	5th	(Serbia) Aleksandar Veselinović	26 August 2024
Dinamo	(Albania) Dritan Mehmeti	Sacked	27 August 2024	10th	(Albania) Erion Xhafa	27 August 2024
Dinamo	(Albania) Erion Xhafa	End of caretaker spell	11 September 2024	8th	(Albania) Ilir Daja	11 September 2024
Bylis	(Nigeria) Ndubuisi Egbo	Mutual consent	25 September 2024	9th	(Albania) Nevil Dede	25 September 2024
Laçi	(Albania) Armando Cungu	Resigned	28 September 2024	10th	(Italy) Francesco Passiatore	28 September 2024
Laçi	(Italy) Francesco Passiatore	End of caretaker spell	10 October 2024	10th	(Italy) Francesco Moriero	10 October 2024
Tirana	(Albania) Bledi Shkëmbi	Mutual consent	5 November 2024	7th	(Albania) Gugash Magani	6 November 2024
Skënderbeu	(Serbia) Ivan Gvozdenović	Resigned	1 December 2024	9th	(Albania) Ernest Gjoka	3 December 2024
Elbasani	(Italy) Roberto Bordin	Resigned	5 December 2024	5th	(Serbia) Ivan Gvozdenović	6 December 2024
Tirana	(Albania) Gugash Magani	Resigned	20 January 2025	9th	(Albania) Bledi Shkëmbi	20 January 2025
Teuta	(Albania) Edi Martini	Resigned	21 January 2025	7th	(Albania) Bledar Devolli	22 January 2025
Bylis	(Albania) Nevil Dede	Resigned	9 February 2025	6th	(Albania) Gentian Mezani	11 February 2025
Teuta	(Albania) Bledar Devolli	Sacked	17 February 2025	9th	(Albania) Bledar Hodo	17 February 2025
Partizani	(Serbia) Aleksandar Veselinović	Sacked	21 February 2025	4th	(Albania) Arbër Abilaliaj	21 February 2025
Partizani	(Albania) Arbër Abilaliaj	End of caretaker spell	28 March 2025	4th	(Albania) Skënder Gega	28 March 2025

== League table ==
Pos	Team	Pld	W	D	L	GF	GA	GD	Pts	Qualification or relegation
1	Egnatia (C)	36	16	11	9	47	30	+17	59	Qualification for the Final four round
2	Vllaznia	36	15	12	9	54	39	+15	57	Qualification for the Final four round
3	Dinamo City	36	14	13	9	49	41	+8	55	Qualification for the Final four round
4	Partizani	36	13	14	9	38	33	+5	53	Qualification for the Final four round
5	Elbasani	36	11	17	8	40	38	+2	50	
6	Teuta	36	10	14	12	29	42	−13	44	
7	Bylis	36	11	9	16	33	50	−17	42	
8	Tirana (O)	36	7	18	11	43	44	−1	39	Qualification for the relegation play-off
9	Skënderbeu (R)	36	9	11	16	35	45	−10	38	Relegation to the 2025–26 Kategoria e Parë
10	Laçi (R)	36	8	13	15	31	37	−6	37	Relegation to the 2025–26 Kategoria e Parë

Source: Albanian Football Association
Rules for classification: 1) Points; 2) Head-to-head points; 3) Head-to-head goal difference; 4) Head-to-head goals scored; 5) Goal difference; 6) Goals scored; 7) Draw.
(C) Champions; (O) Play-off winners; (R) Relegated

== Results ==
Clubs will play each other four times for a total of 36 matches each.

=== First half of season ===
Home \ Away	BYL	DIN	EGN	ELB	LAÇ	PAR	SKË	TEU	TIR	VLL
Bylis	—	1–0	0–2	0–1	0–0	2–1	0–1	4–0	2–2	1–0
Dinamo	1–1	—	0–2	2–1	2–1	1–2	2–1	2–0	2–1	2–1
Egnatia	4–0	1–1	—	3–1	2–1	0–2	1–0	0–0	1–0	1–1
Elbasani	3–1	0–5	0–0	—	1–0	1–1	1–1	3–0	1–1	1–2
Laçi	0–0	0–0	2–0	1–1	—	1–1	1–0	0–1	0–0	3–1
Partizani	1–0	2–2	1–1	2–2	1–0	—	2–1	1–1	0–0	0–1
Skënderbeu	2–2	2–2	0–1	1–1	2–1	0–2	—	2–3	0–0	1–0
Teuta	2–1	1–1	2–1	0–0	1–1	0–2	1–1	—	3–1	1–2
Tirana	4–0	0–0	1–1	1–1	1–1	0–0	2–1	0–0	—	3–4
Vllaznia	2–0	2–3	3–1	0–0	2–1	2–2	2–0	2–1	2–2	—

Source: Albanian Football Association
Legend: Blue = home team win; Yellow = draw; Red = away team win.

=== Second half of season ===
Home \ Away	BYL	DIN	EGN	ELB	LAÇ	PAR	SKË	TEU	TIR	VLL
Bylis	—	2–1	0–2	1–1	0–0	1–0	0–3	1–0	0–3	1–0
Dinamo	3–1	—	2–1	3–1	2–0	1–0	1–1	1–1	0–2	0–0
Egnatia	2–1	2–0	—	1–2	1–0	2–0	0–0	1–1	1–1	2–2
Elbasani	1–0	1–1	1–2	—	1–2	2–0	0–0	3–1	2–1	1–1
Laçi	0–3	1–0	1–1	0–1	—	0–0	1–2	3–0	3–1	2–2
Partizani	2–3	1–1	1–0	2–0	1–0	—	1–1	0–0	1–1	2–0
Skënderbeu	1–2	4–1	1–0	0–2	0–2	1–2	—	2–1	1–1	0–4
Teuta	0–0	0–0	2–1	0–0	1–0	0–2	1–0	—	2–1	1–3
Tirana	2–2	1–4	0–4	1–1	4–1	3–0	1–0	0–1	—	0–0
Vllaznia	3–0	3–0	0–2	1–1	1–1	2–0	1–2	0–0	2–1	—

Source: Albanian Football Association
Legend: Blue = home team win; Yellow = draw; Red = away team win.

== Final four round ==
A draw is conducted in order to decide the semi-finals. Seeding of teams is based on their league ranking, with two seeded teams and two unseeded. In the semi-finals, in case of a tie after 90 minutes, the team with the higher league ranking will qualify to the final.

=== Bracket ===
Semi-finals
4 May
Vllaznia	2
Dinamo City	1
5 May
Egnatia (b.p.)	0
Partizani	0

Final
12 May
Vllaznia	0
Egnatia	4
Third place play-off
10 May
Dinamo City	1
Partizani	2

=== Semi-finals ===
4 May 2025
20:00

Vllaznia	2−1	Dinamo City
Balaj 29' (pen.), 36' (pen.)		Itodo 51'

Arena Kombëtare, Tirana
Attendance: 3,000
Referee: Eldorjan Hamiti

5 May 2025
20:00

Egnatia	0−0	Partizani

Arena Kombëtare, Tirana
Attendance: 4,200
Referee: Juxhin Xhaja

Egnatia qualified to the final as the team with the better position in the regular season.

=== Third place play-off ===
10 May 2025
19:00

Dinamo City	1−2	Partizani
Bregu 16'		Malaj 37'; Guxhufi 46'

Elbasan Arena, Elbasan
Referee: Florian Lata

=== Final ===
12 May 2025
20:00

Vllaznia	0−4	Egnatia
		Lushkja 6', 49'; Melo 82'; Ujka 90+4'

Arena Kombëtare, Tirana
Referee: Szymon Marciniak (Poland)

== Relegation play-off ==
4 May 2025
18:00

Tirana	1−0	Pogradeci
Hysenllari 90' (o.g.)

Elbasan Arena, Elbasan
Referee: Andi Koçi

== Season statistics ==
=== Scoring ===
==== Top scorers ====
As of 12 May 2025

Rank	Player	Club	Goals
1	(Albania) Bekim Balaj	Vllaznia	19
2	(Albania) Regi Lushkja	Egnatia	16
3	(Nigeria) Peter Itodo	Dinamo City	13
3	(France) Walid Jarmouni	Tirana	13
5	(Kosovo) Baton Zabërgja	Dinamo City	12
6	(Albania) Dejvi Bregu	Dinamo City	11
6	(Egypt) Saleh Nasr	Skënderbeu/Teuta	11

=== Hat-tricks ===
Player	Club	Against	Result	Date
(Albania) Arsen Lleshi	Elbasani	Teuta	3–1 (H)	11 January 2025
(Albania) Bekim Balaj	Vllaznia	Skënderbeu	0–4 (A)	19 January 2025
(Egypt) Saleh Nasr	Skënderbeu	Dinamo City	4–1 (H)	30 March 2025

Notes

(H) – Home team
(A) – Away team

=== Discipline ===
==== Player ====
- Most yellow cards: 16
  - (Albania) Albano Aleksi (Egnatia)
- Most red cards: 2
  - (Senegal) Bakary Goudiaby (Dinamo City)
  - (Ghana) McCarthy Ofori (Bylis)
  - (Kosovo) Melos Bajrami (Vllaznia)
  - (Brazil) William Cordeiro (Laçi)

== Awards ==
=== Annual awards ===
Award	Winner	Club
Manager of the Season	(Albania) Edlir Tetova	Egnatia
Player of the Season	(Albania) Bekim Balaj	Vllaznia
Young Player of the Season	(Albania) Fabjan Përndreca	Bylis

Team of the Year
Goalkeeper	(Albania) Mario Dajsinani (Egnatia)			
Defenders	(Albania) Arsid Kruja (Teuta)	(Albania) Marçelino Preka (Partizani)	(Albania) Naser Aliji (Dinamo City)	(Albania) Emiljano Musta (Elbasani)
Midfielders	(Albania) Esat Mala (Vllaznia)		(Albania) Serxho Ujka (Egnatia)	(Albania) Regi Lushkja (Egnatia)
Forwards	(Kosovo) Baton Zabërgja (Dinamo City)		(Albania) Bekim Balaj (Vllaznia)	(Albania) Kevin Dodaj (Vllaznia)

== See also ==
- 2024–25 Kategoria e Parë
- 2024–25 Kategoria e Dytë
- 2024–25 Kategoria e Tretë
- 2024–25 Albanian Cup

== Notes and references ==
=== Notes ===
1. Dinamo City is playing their 2024–25 home games at the Elbasan Arena in Elbasan.
2. Tirana is playing their 2024–25 home games in various stadiums depending on availability.
