= Albano Aleksi =

Albanian footballer

Personal information
- Date of birth: 10 October 1992 (age 34)
- Place of birth: Fier, Albania
- Position: Midfielder

Team information
- Current team: Egnatia
- Number: 6

Senior career*
Years	Team	Apps	(Gls)
2013–2015	Butrinti Sarandë	47	(0)
2015–2019	Luftëtari FC	106	(5)
2019–2022	Teuta Durrës	95	(4)
2022–2023	Tirana	33	(0)
2023–	Egnatia	92	(1)
- * Club domestic league appearances and goals as of 25 June 2026

Albano Aleksi (born 10 October 1992) is an Albanian professional footballer who plays as a midfielder for Kategoria Superiore club Egnatia.

== Club career ==
=== Butrinti Sarandë ===
Aleksi made his league debut for the Albanian First Division club on 9 March 2013 in a 1–1 away draw with Besëlidhja Lezhë. He was subbed on for Shkëlzen Dalipaj in the 88th minute.

=== Luftëtari Gjirokastër ===
In Summer 2015, Aleksi moved to then Albanian First Division club Luftëtari FC. He made his league debut for the club on 12 September 2015 in a 2–0 away victory over Dinamo Tirana. He was subbed on for Fejzo Shenaj in the 63rd minute. He scored his first league goal for the club around a month later, in a 2–1 win over Lushnja on 17 October 2015. His goal, scored in the 34th minute, made the score 1–0 in favor of Luftëtari. He played all ninety minutes of the match.

== Statistics ==
As of 30 November 2015

Club	Season	League		Cup		Continental (Note: Including continental competitions, such as UEFA Champions League and UEFA Europa League)		Other (Note: Including other competitions, such as Albanian Supercup and Albanian Superliga's play-off)		Total	
Club	Season	Apps	Goals	Apps	Goals	Apps	Goals	Apps	Goals	Apps	Goals
Butrinti Sarandë	2012–13	3	0	—		—		—		3	0
Butrinti Sarandë	2013–14	20	0	2	0	—		—		22	0
Butrinti Sarandë	2014–15	24	0	0	0	—		—		24	0
Butrinti Sarandë	Total	47	0	2	0	—		—		49	0
Luftëtari FC	2015–16	24	2	1	0	—		—		25	2
Luftëtari FC	2016–17	0	0	0	0	—		—		0	0
Luftëtari FC	Total	24	2	1	0	—		—		25	2
Career total		71	2	3	0	—		—		74	2

== Honours ==
Luftëtari

- Albanian First Division (1): 2015–16

Teuta

- Albanian Superliga (1): 2020-21
- Albanian Cup (1): 2019-20
- Albanian Supercup (2): 2020, 2021

Tirana

- Albanian Supercup (1) :2022
- Albanian Cup
  - Runner-up: 2023

Egnatia

- Albanian Superliga (3):2023-24, 2024-25, 2025-26
- Albanian Cup (1): 2023–24
  - Runner-up: 2024–25
- Albanian Supercup (1) :2024
  - Runner-up: 2023
