= Bruno Puja =

Albanian footballer

Personal information
- Date of birth: 20 January 2000 (age 26)
- Place of birth: Kavajë, Albania
- Position: Goalkeeper

Team information
- Current team: Bylis
- Number: 1

Youth career
- 2011–: Besa Kavajë

Senior career*
Years	Team	Apps	(Gls)
2015–2018	Besa	3	(0)
2018–2021	Kastrioti	16	(0)
2021–2023	Egnatia	34	(0)
2023	Bylis	0	(0)
2024	Erzeni	3	(0)
2024–	Bylis	2	(0)

International career^{‡}
2015–2016	Albania U17	2	(0)
- * Club domestic league appearances and goals as of 1 June 2024 ‡ National team caps and goals as of 24 October 2015

Bruno Puja (born 20 January 2000) is an Albanian professional footballer who plays as a goalkeeper for Albanian club Bylis.

== Club career ==
=== Early career ===
Puja started his youth career at age 11 with hometown club Besa Kavajë. He joined the U-13 team on 1 September 2011. During the 2015–16 season he played for the U-19 team in Albanian Superliga U-19 group B.

=== Besa Kavajë ===
He made his professional debut at age 15 with Besa Kavajë under coach Dorjan Bubeqi in the 2015–16 Albanian Cup match against Laçi on 16 September 2015, coming on as a substitute at half-time in place of Klajdo Arkaxhiu. The match finished in a 1–3 loss.

=== Club ===
As of 28 October 2017

Club statistics
Club	Season	League			Cup		Europe (Note: Including continental competitions, such as UEFA Champions League and UEFA Europa League)		Other (Note: Including other competitions, such as Albanian Supercup)		Total	
Club	Season	Division	Apps	Goals	Apps	Goals	Apps	Goals	Apps	Goals	Apps	Goals
Besa Kavajë	2015–16	Albanian First Division	—		1	0	—		—		1	0
Besa Kavajë	2016–17	Albanian First Division	1	0	0	0	—		—		1	0
Besa Kavajë	2017–18	Albanian First Division	0	0	—		—		—		0	0
Besa Kavajë	Total		1	0	1	0	—		—		2	0
Career total			1	0	1	0	—		—		2	0

== International career ==
Following his professional debut with Besa Kavajë in September 2015, Puja was immediately called up to the Albania national under-17 football team by coach Džemal Mustedanagić to participate in the 2016 UEFA European Under-17 Championship qualification from 22 to 27 October 2015. He played two full 80-minute matches on two first-match-days against Switzerland U17 and Netherlands U17, but Albania U17 lost both matches. For the closing match against Wales U17, he was an unused substitute, and the coach Džemal Mustedanagić left his place to fellow goalkeeper Everest Braçe.
