= Bledar Sinella =

Albanian footballer and manager

Personal information
- Full name: Bledar Sinella
- Date of birth: 10 August 1976 (age 50)
- Place of birth: Kavajë, Albania
- Position: Midfielder

Senior career*
Years	Team	Apps	(Gls)
1994–1995	Besa	3	(1)
1997–1998	Besa	12	(1)
2002–2003	Besa	11	(0)

Managerial career
- 2014–2015: Besa
- 2015–2016: Tomori
- 2017: Laçi
- 2017–2018: Besa
- 2019: Egnatia
- * Club domestic league appearances and goals

Bledar Sinella (born 10 August 1976) is a retired Albanian footballer and most recently manager of Egnatia football club in the Albanian Second Division.

== Managerial career ==
A successful coach with Besa's youth teams, Sinella was appointed to the manager position of Besa Kavajë's senior team on November 14, 2014, following Artan Mërgjyshi's resignation due to poor results at the start of the season. Sinella also served as assistant manager to Përparim Daiu during his tenure at KF Laçi.

He succeeded Ilir Duro as coach of Egnatia in January 2019, only to leave the club himself in April 2019.

== Personal life ==
In May 2019, Sinella withdrew as a candidate in the race to become mayor of Kavajë.
