= Giovanni Colella =

Italian football coach

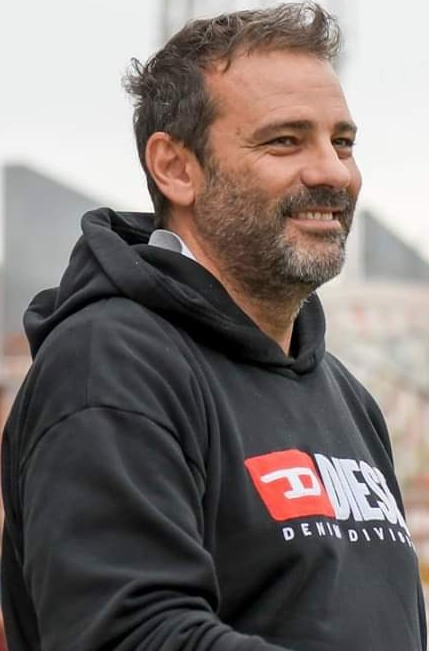
- Giovanni Colella

Personal information
- Date of birth: 10 August 1966 (age 60)
- Place of birth: Salerno, Italy

Managerial career
- Years: Team
- 1999–2001: Belluno
- 2001–2002: Treviso (Youth)
- 2003–2008: Sandona
- 2010–2011: Verona (Youth)
- 2012–2013: Como (Youth)
- 2013–2015: Como
- 2015–2016: Renate
- 2016: Siena
- 2017–2018: Bassano
- 2018: Vicenza
- 2019: Vicenza
- 2019–2020: Rimini
- 2020: Apolonia
- 2021: Legnago
- 2022: Legnago
- 2022–2023: Partizani
- 2024–2025: Feronikeli

Giovanni Colella (born 10 August 1966) is an Italian football manager.

== Managerial career ==
=== Early years ===
Colella has been the manager of a few clubs in the lower divisions of Italy, reaching up to Serie C with Bassano, Vicenza and Rimini.

=== Apolonia ===
In 2020, Giovanni Colella was given a director role at Apolonia when they were promoted to the Albanian Superliga. However, their then-current coach, Artan Mërgjyshi, left, so Colella was promoted to Apolonia's new manager. During his short tenure, Apolonia earned just 2 points in 5 matches, scoring four goals and conceding 14.

Shortly after, he resigned, and the club board promptly accepted his resignation.

=== Partizani ===
On 10 August 2022, Colella was appointed as manager at Partizani. This was made possible by the club's sporting director, Elton Marini. At first, Partizani won their first three fixtures in the Abissnet Superiore, and even after some bad runs of form, Partizani were in first place. During his tenure, Partizani won against Vllaznia in Shkodër for the first time in 3 years. The last time Partizani had won in Skhodër was in the 2019–20 season, when Colella's compatriot coached them, Franco Lerda. He also led his team to victory against their city rivals, Tirana, for the first time in 1 year and nine months.

Things changed in 2023 because Partizani had another bad run of form in January, which was a big blow to their objectives. But in February, the team got everything together and went back to winning ways. Partizani then went on to win the title, the 17th in the club’s history. Colella became the second (after Bencivenga in 2009) Italian coach to win the Albanian League.

== Honours ==
Partizani Tirana

- Kategoria Superiore: 2022–23
