= Redi Kasa =

Italian-Albanian footballer (born 2001)

Personal information
- Date of birth: 1 September 2001 (age 25)
- Place of birth: Parma, Italy
- Height: 1.85 m (6 ft 1 in)
- Position: Forward

Team information
- Current team: Flamurtari
- Number: 82

Youth career
- Parma

Senior career*
Years	Team	Apps	(Gls)
2019–2021	Parma	0	(0)
2020–2021	→ Fermana (loan)	1	(0)
2021–2023	Septemvri Sofia	27	(9)
2022	→ Tsarsko Selo (loan)	12	(1)
2023–2025	Egnatia	44	(4)
2023–2024	→ Olimpija Ljubljana (loan)	7	(1)
2025-2026	Gjilani	7	(0)
2026–	Flamurtari	8	(0)
- * Club domestic league appearances and goals as of 13 May 2026

Redi Kasa (born 1 September 2001) is a professional footballer who plays as a forward for Kategoria Superiore club Flamurtari. Born in Italy, he represented Albania at youth international level.

== Career ==
Kasa started his career with Italian Serie A side Parma.

In 2020, he was sent on loan to Fermana in Serie C, where he made one league appearance, on 28 February 2021 in a 0–0 draw with Carpi.

On 28 July 2021, Kasa signed for Bulgarian second-tier club Septemvri.

Before the second half of 2021–22, he signed for Tsarsko Selo in the Bulgarian top flight until end of the season.

On 10 January 2023, Kasa signed for the first time in his native Albania for top tier KF Egnatia.

On 30 August 2023, Kasa signed with Slovenian top tier NK Olimpija Ljubljana, where he made his debut in UEFA Conference League groups.

On 14 July 2025, he signed for Kosovar top tier SC Gjilani.

On 4 February 2026, Kasa came back to Albanian first league, in Flamurtari FC.
