= Fernando Medeiros =

Brazilian footballer (born 1996)

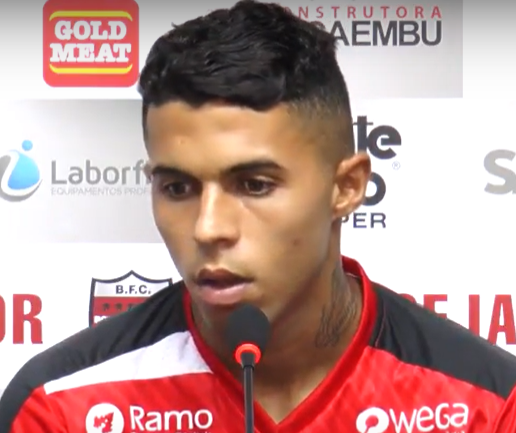
- Fernando Medeiros in 2017

Personal information
- Full name: Fernando Medeiros da Silva
- Date of birth: 10 February 1996 (age 30)
- Place of birth: Santos, Brazil
- Height: 1.81 m (5 ft 11 1/2 in)
- Position: Defensive midfielder

Team information
- Current team: Egnatia
- Number: 7

Youth career
- 2006–2015: Santos

Senior career*
Years	Team	Apps	(Gls)
2015–2018	Santos	4	(1)
2017	→ Botafogo-SP (loan)	6	(1)
2017	→ Vila Nova (loan)	10	(1)
2019	Bahia	2	(0)
2019	Rayo Majadahonda	2	(0)
2019–2021	Portimonense	23	(0)
2021	Ituano	11	(1)
2021	Confiança	2	(0)
2021–2022	Audax Rio	12	(2)
2022	Betim Futebol	17	(1)
2022–2024	Egnatia	73	(11)
2024	Sumgayit	5	(1)
2025–	Egnatia	54	(7)
- * Club domestic league appearances and goals as of 25 June 2026

Fernando Medeiros da Silva (born 10 February 1996), known as Fernando Medeiros, is a Brazilian footballer who plays for Albanian side Egnatia.

== Club career ==
=== Santos ===
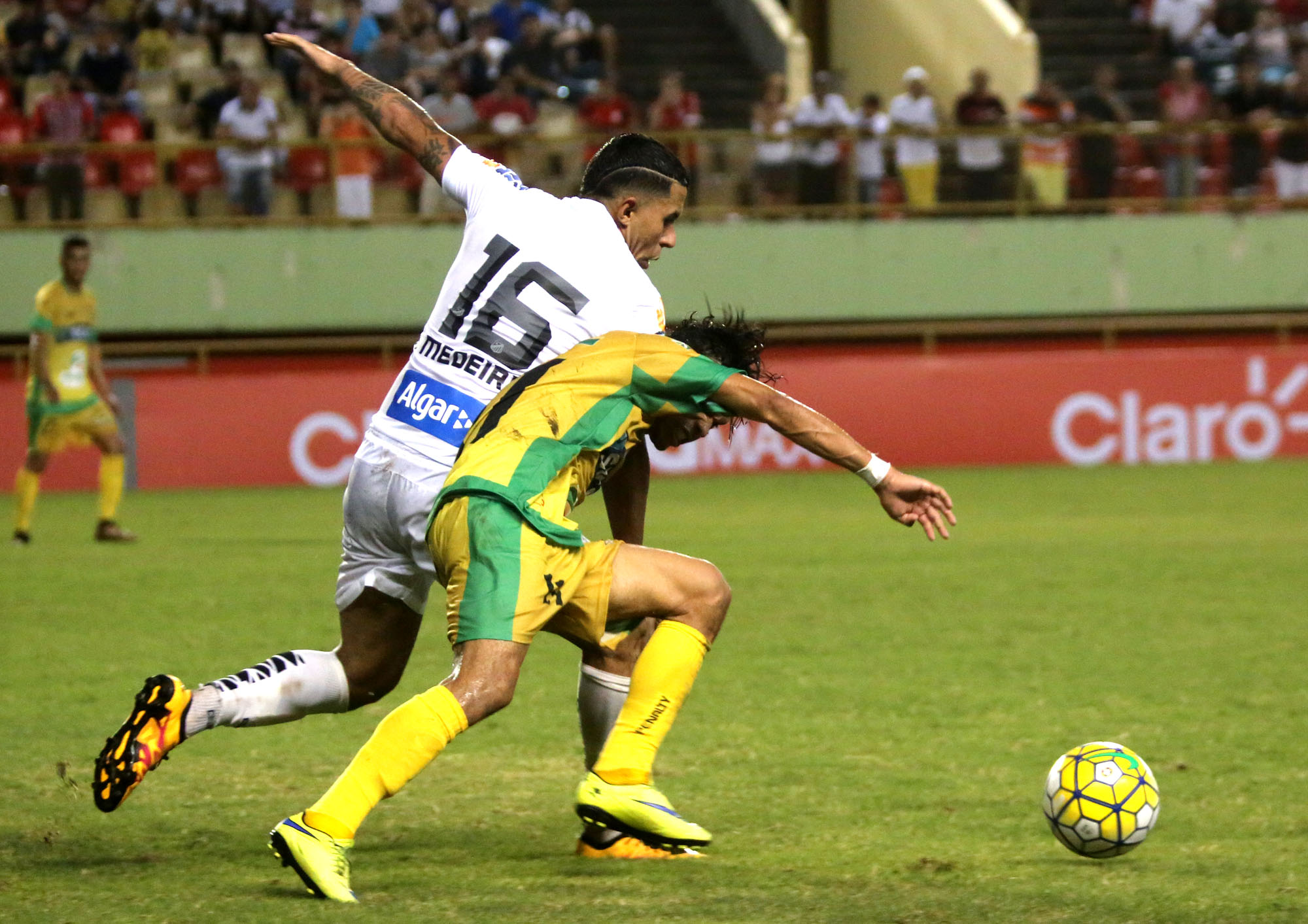
Medeiros (in white) playing for Santos in 2016

Born in Santos, São Paulo, Medeiros joined Santos' youth setup in 2006, aged ten. After progressing through the club's youth setup, he was promoted to the main squad on 29 September 2015 by manager Dorival Júnior.

Medeiros made his first team – and Série A – debut on 6 December 2015, coming on as a second-half substitute for fellow youth graduate Alison in a 5–1 home routing of Atlético Paranaense. He scored his first senior goal the following 11 May, netting the last in a 3–0 Copa do Brasil away win against Galvez.

On 19 January 2017, after again appearing rarely, Medeiros was loaned to Botafogo-SP until the end of the 2017 Campeonato Paulista. On 22 May, he moved to Série B side Vila Nova also in a temporary deal, until the end of the year.

Upon returning from loan, Medeiros only featured for Santos' B-team.

=== Bahia ===
On 24 January 2019, Medeiros signed for Bahia after his contract with Peixe expired. He left the club at the end of May 2019, where his contract expired.

=== Portimonense ===
On 24 September 2019, he signed a 4-year contract with the Portuguese Primeira Liga club Portimonense.

=== Egnatia ===
He signed for Albanian club Egnatia on 18 July 2022.

=== Sumgayit ===
On 15 August 2024, he signed a contract with the Azerbaijan Premier League side Sumgayit. On 23 December 2024, his contract with the club was terminated by mutual agreement.

== Personal life ==
Fernando's twin brother, Flávio, is also a footballer and a midfielder. He also played for Santos as a youth.

== Career statistics ==
As of 1 November 2020

Club	Season	League			State League		Cup		Continental		Other		Total	
Club	Season	Division	Apps	Goals	Apps	Goals	Apps	Goals	Apps	Goals	Apps	Goals	Apps	Goals
Santos	2015	Série A	1	0	—		0	0	—		—		1	0
Santos	2016	Série A	1	0	0	0	2	1	0	0	—		3	1
Santos	2018	Série A	0	0	—		—		—		6 (Note: Appearance(s) in Copa Paulista)	0	6	0
Santos	Total		2	0	—		2	1	—		6	0	10	1
Botafogo-SP (loan)	2017	Série C	0	0	6	1	0	0	—		—		6	1
Vila Nova (loan)	2017	Série B	10	1	—		—		—		—		10	1
Bahia	2019	Série A	0	0	2	0	0	0	—		0	0	2	0
Portimonense	2019–20	Primeira Liga	13	0	—		0	0	—		1 (Note: Appearance(s) in Taça da Liga)	0	14	0
Portimonense	2020–21	Primeira Liga	7	0	—		1	0	—		0	0	8	0
Portimonense	Total		20	0	—		1	0	—		1	0	22	0
Ituano	2021	Série C	0	0	0	0	0	0	—		—		0	0
Career total			32	1	8	1	3	1	—		7	0	50	3

== Honours ==
Santos

- Campeonato Paulista: 2016
- Copa São Paulo de Futebol Júnior: 2014
- Copa do Brasil Sub-20: 2013

Bahia

- Campeonato Baiano: 2019

Egnatia

- Kategoria Superiore: 2023–24, 2024–25
- Albanian Cup: 2023–24, Runner-up:2024–25
