= KF Egnatia =

Albanian football club

Egnatia
- Full name: Klubi i Futbollit Egnatia
- Founded: 15 September 1962; 64 years ago 22 Shtatori (1962–91) Vullneti Rrogozhinë (1991–98) Egnatia (1998–present)
- Ground: Egnatia Arena
- Capacity: 5,000
- Owner(s): Demrozi Costruzioni S.r.l. (37.5%); Foglia Engineering S.r.l. (37.5%); Rrogozhinë Municipality (25%)
- President: Agim Demrozi
- Manager: Nevil Dede
- League: Kategoria Superiore
- 2025–26: Kategoria Superiore, 1st (champions)
| Home colours | Away colours |

KF Egnatia (Albanian: Klubi i Futbollit Egnatia) is an Albanian professional football club based in Rrogozhinë. The club competes in Kategoria Superiore, the top tier of Albanian football. Their home ground is Egnatia Arena, which has a capacity of 5,000 spectators.

The club was founded on 15 September 1934 under the name 22 Shtatori Rrogozhinë. In 1991 the name of the club was changed to Vullneti Rrogozhinë, before being renamed to Egnatia, in 1998. The club secured its first championship title in 2024.

The club's name derives from the ancient Via Egnatia, the Roman road that passed through the Rrogozhinë area. The road itself was named after Gnaeus Egnatius, the Roman proconsul of the Roman province of Macedonia who oversaw its construction in the 2nd century BC.

== History ==
Football developed as a popular pastime in Rrogozhinë during the early years of the First World War. Being close to Kavajë, a city with one of Albania’s strongest footballing traditions, the town benefited from its neighbour’s influence and gradually formed an amateur team that would later compete in the country’s second division. The club’s first recorded match took place in 1934, when it faced Besa in a friendly and lost 7–1. Besa’s victory was largely inspired from the five goals scored by Mustafa Cara, an agronomy student studying in Bari, Italy, who was also playing for local club Fidelis Astria.

After the end of World War II, Albanian football was reorganized, with participation in the top two divisions restricted to district-level representative teams. As Rrogozhinë was still a locality at the time, Egnatia was unable to compete at the national level under the new system.

Previous club logo

Egnatia earned promotion to Kategoria Superiore for the first time after winning the 2003–04 Kategoria e Parë season. The club’s first spell in the top flight lasted only one season, as it was relegated at the end of the 2004–05 campaign. During that season, Hysen Dedja and Petrit Haxhia were succeeded as head coach by Alfred Ferko.

=== Recent years ===
Egnatia were promoted back to the top flight of Albanian football, the Kategoria Superiore, for the second time in their history on 2 May 2021, following a 1–0 victory over local rivals Besa Kavajë in the Promotion Round of the 2020–21 Kategoria e Parë. Under head coach Gugash Magani, they finished top of Group B during the regular season and qualified for the Promotion Round, where they also finished top, securing their place in the championship final held on 21 May 2021 against the winners of Group A, Dinamo Tirana, where they won 1–0 through a stoppage-time winner from Ndriçim Shtubina. On 26 May 2024, Egnatia won their first Kategoria Superiore title after beating Partizani in the final. They have since gone on to win three back-to-back league titles in 2023–24, 2024–25, and 2025–26.

On August 13, 2026, Egnatia eliminated Irish club Shamrock Rovers 6–4 on aggregate to advance to the 2026–27 UEFA Europa League play-off round, guaranteeing a team representing Albania in the group stage of a European club competition for the first time since KF Skënderbeu in the 2017-18 UEFA Europa League. They would eventually qualify for the 2026-27 UEFA Conference League, having lost to Norwegian club Lillestrom SK 2-1 on aggregate in the play-off round.

== Stadium ==
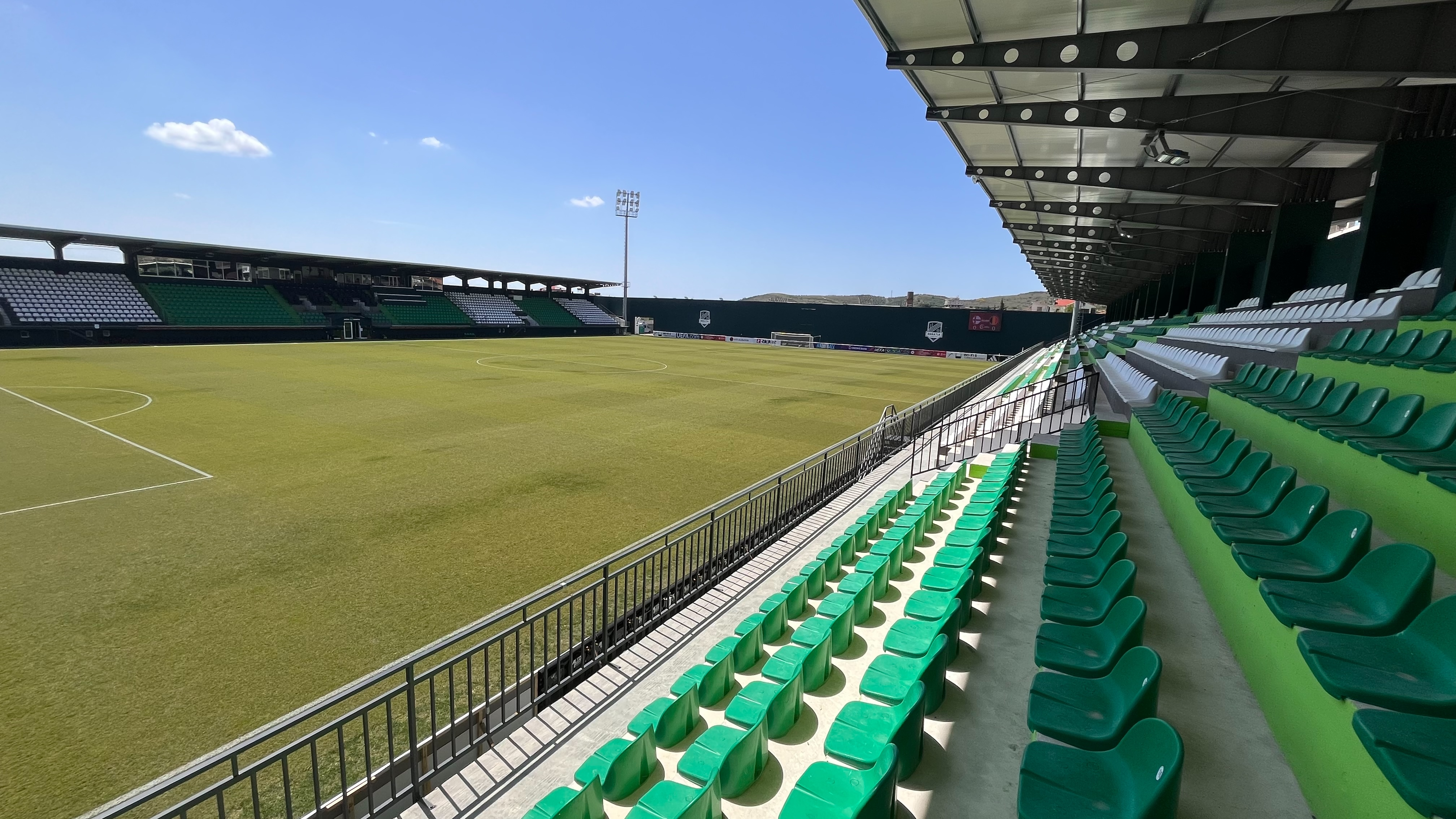
Egnatia Arena in 2025

The club has played at the existing site of Egnatia Arena, since the team's foundation, the capacity of which was around 1,200, with one small main stand located to the south. The stadium was originally named Rrogozhina Stadium and later had names such as Egnatia Stadium as well as the Hasan Zyla Stadium.

The club first set foot on the newly named Arena Egnatia on the existing site of the stadium on 17 February 2021, with the club in pole position to achieve promotion to the Kategoria Superiore, the top tier of Albanian football.

In May 2024, it was announced that the club had started working on building the new stand opposite the main Demrozi Stadium stand, to be named posthumously after former player Raphael Dwamena who died playing for the club the previous season. The club was also looking to secure land near the city of Rrogozhinë to build a new training complex in order to move from their existing ground in Lekaj.

== Honours ==
- Kategoria Superiore
  - Winners (3): 2023–24, 2024–25, 2025–26
- Kategoria e Parë
  - Winners (2): 2002–03, 2020–21
  - Runners-up (1): 2003–04
- Kategoria e Dytë
  - Winners (1): 2016–17
- Albanian Cup
  - Winners (2): 2022–23, 2023–24
  - Runners-up (2): 2024–25, 2025–26
- Albanian Supercup
  - Winners (1): 2024
  - Runners-up (2): 2023, 2025

== European record ==
As of match played 15 October 2026

| Season | Competition | Round | Club | Home | Away | Agg. |
|---|---|---|---|---|---|---|
| 2023–24 | UEFA Europa Conference League | 1QR | Ararat-Armenia | 4–4 (aet) | 1–1 | 5–5 (2–4 p) |
| 2024–25 | UEFA Champions League | 1QR | (Bosnia and Herzegovina) Borac Banja Luka | 2–1 (aet) | 0–1 | 2–2 (1–4 p) |
| 2024–25 | UEFA Conference League | 2QR | (Iceland) Víkingur Reykjavík | 0–2 | 1–0 | 1–2 |
| 2025–26 | UEFA Champions League | 1QR | (Iceland) Breiðablik | 1–0 | 0–5 | 1–5 |
| 2025–26 | UEFA Conference League | 2QR | (Belarus) Dinamo Minsk | 1–0 | 2–0 | 3–0 |
| 2025–26 | UEFA Conference League | 3QR | (Slovenia) Olimpija Ljubljana | 2–4 (aet) | 0–0 | 2–4 |
| 2026–27 | UEFA Champions League | 1QR | (Moldova) Petrocub Hîncești | 6–1 | 1–1 | 7–2 |
| 2026–27 | UEFA Champions League | 2QR | (Slovenia) Celje | 3–3 | 2–2 (aet) | 5–5 (1–4 p) |
| 2026–27 | UEFA Europa League | 3QR | (Republic of Ireland) Shamrock Rovers | 5–1 | 1–3 | 6–4 |
| 2026–27 | UEFA Europa League | PO | (Norway) Lillestrøm | 0–0 | 1–2 (aet) | 1–2 |
| 2026–27 | UEFA Conference League | LP | (Denmark) Midtjylland | 1–1 | —N/a | |
| 2026–27 | UEFA Conference League | LP | (Denmark) AGF | —N/a | 1–1 | |
| 2026–27 | UEFA Conference League | LP | (Romania) Universitatea Craiova | —N/a | 0–2 | |
| 2026–27 | UEFA Conference League | LP | (Gibraltar) Lincoln Red Imps | | —N/a | |
| 2026–27 | UEFA Conference League | LP | (Lithuania) Kauno Žalgiris | | —N/a | |
| 2026–27 | UEFA Conference League | LP | (Portugal) Braga | —N/a | | |

Notes

- QR: Qualifying round
- Biggest ever European home victory: Egnatia 6–1 (Moldova) Petrocub Hîncești (15 July 2026)
- Biggest ever European home defeat: Egnatia 2–4 (Slovenia) Olimpija Ljubljana (14 August 2025)
- Biggest ever European away victory: (Belarus) Dinamo Minsk 0–2 Egnatia (24 July 2025)
- Biggest ever European away defeat: (Iceland) Breiðablik 5–0 Egnatia (15 July 2025)
- Most European appearances: (Brazil) Fernando Medeiros (23)
- Most European goals: (Albania) Ildi Gruda (5)

== Egnatia statistics in Kategoria Superiore ==
Since the Kategoria Superiore began in 2004, KF Egnatia have played 219 Superliga matches, scored 256 goals and conceded 232. The club has collected so far 301 points, won 83 games, drawn 59 and lost 78. The club's goal difference is +24.

Data correct up to 29th May 2026.

=== Recent seasons ===
| Season | League | | | | | | | | | Cup | Supercup | European | | Top goalscorer | |
| Season | Division | P | W | D | L | F | A | Pts | Pos | Cup | Supercup | European | | Players | Goals |
|---|---|---|---|---|---|---|---|---|---|---|---|---|---|---|---|
| 2004–05 | Superiore↓ | 36 | 7 | 7 | 22 | 26 | 48 | 28 | 9th | R1 | —N/a | —N/a | —N/a | (Albania) Elton Çeno | 6 |
| 2021–22 | Superiore | 36 | 8 | 11 | 17 | 30 | 49 | 35 | 8th | QF | — | — | — | (Brazil) Pedro | 10 |
| 2022–23 | Superiore | 36 | 14 | 10 | 12 | 46 | 32 | 52 | 3rd | W | —N/a | —N/a | —N/a | (Ghana) Raphael Dwamena | 9 |
| 2023–24 | Superiore | 38 | 19 | 10 | 9 | 52 | 38 | 67 | 1st | W | RU | UECL | QR1 | (Ghana) Raphael Dwamena | 9 |
| 2024–25 | Superiore | 38 | 17 | 12 | 9 | 51 | 30 | 63 | 1st | RU | W | UCL; UECL | QR1; QR2 | (Albania) Regi Lushkja | 16 |
| 2025–26 | Superiore | 39 | 19 | 9 | 11 | 50 | 35 | 68 | 1st | RU | RU | UCL; UECL | QR1; QR3 | (Ivory Coast) Soumaila Bakayoko (Belgium) Alessandro Albanese | 9 |
| 2026–27 | Superiore | | | | | | | | | | | UCL; UEL; UECL | QR2; PO; LP | | |

Key
League: P = Matches played; W = Matches won; D = Matches drawn; L = Matches lost; F = Goals for; A = Goals against; Pts = Points won; Pos = Final position;
Cup / Europe: PR = Preliminary round; QR = Qualifying round; R1 = First round; R2 = Second round; Group = Group stage; QF = Quarter-final; SF = Semi-final; RU = Runner-up; W = Competition won;

=== Record transfers ===
| Rank | Player | To | Fee | Year |
|---|---|---|---|---|
| 1. | (Brazil) Jackson | (Turkey) Istanbulspor | €400k | 2023 |
| 2. | (Turkey) Melih İbrahimoğlu | (Turkey) Konyaspor | €350k | 2024 |
| 3. | (Albania) Alen Sherri | (Italy) Cagliari | €300k | 2024 |
| 3. | (Albania) Serxho Ujka | (Belgium) Zulte Waregem | €300k | 2025 |
| 4. | (Albania) Regi Lushkja | (Iran) Tractor S.C. | €250k | 2025 |
| 5. | (Lithuania) Gytis Paulauskas | (Ukraine) Kolos Kovalivka | €200k | 2024 |

== Players ==
=== First-team squad ===
As of 1 September 2026

Note: Flags indicate national team as defined under FIFA eligibility rules; some limited exceptions apply. Players may hold more than one non-FIFA nationality.

| No. | Pos. | Nation | Player |
|---|---|---|---|
| 1 | GK | GEO | Levan Tandilashvili |
| 2 | FW | CMR | Daniel Adjessa |
| 4 | DF | AZE | Zamiq Əliyev |
| 6 | MF | ALB | Albano Aleksi (captain) |
| 7 | MF | BRA | Fernando Medeiros |
| 8 | FW | CIV | Ibrahim Diabaté |
| 9 | FW | CIV | Soumaila Bakayoko |
| 10 | FW | BEL | Alessandro Albanese |
| 12 | GK | ALB | Bruno Puja |
| 13 | DF | ALB | Alessandro Kacbufi |
| 16 | DF | ALB | Edison Ndreca |
| 17 | MF | KOS | Altin Kryeziu |
| 19 | FW | ALB | Deivid Hoxha (on loan from Panetolikos) |
| 20 | FW | MAR | Karim Loukili |

| No. | Pos. | Nation | Player |
|---|---|---|---|
| 22 | DF | ESP | Guillem Jaime |
| 23 | MF | ALB | Bjorni Duka |
| 24 | DF | ALB | Numan Ajeti |
| 28 | DF | ALB | Eljon Sota |
| 29 | DF | BRA | Andrey Yago |
| 30 | MF | ALB | Reis Bakalli |
| 33 | DF | ALB | Eneo Bitri |
| 35 | MF | ALB | Zyber Çullhaj |
| 55 | DF | ALB | Geralb Smajli |
| 77 | FW | ALB | Ildi Gruda |
| 80 | MF | ALB | Ledio Beqja |
| 82 | FW | ALB | Redi Kasa |
| 98 | GK | ALB | Mario Dajsinani |
| 99 | FW | CRC | Jurguens Montenegro |

=== Retired numbers ===
Note: Flags indicate national team as defined under FIFA eligibility rules; some limited exceptions apply. Players may hold more than one non-FIFA nationality.

| No. | Pos. | Nation | Player |
|---|---|---|---|
| 7 | FW | GHA | Raphael Dwamena (2022–2023) – posthumous honour) |

== Personnel ==
=== Current technical staff ===
| Position | Name |
|---|---|
| Head coach | (Albania) Nevil Dede |
| Assistant coach | (Albania) Artan Karapici |
| Goalkeeping coach | (Albania) Taulant Guma |
| Athletic Coach | (Albania) Aurel Loci |
| Video Analyst | (Albania) Revion Mekshi |
| Physiotherapist | (Albania) Ilir Kapllani |
| Doctor | (Albania) Ervin Karafili |
| Doctor | (Albania) Emiljano Bizhdili |

=== Management ===
| Position | Name |
|---|---|
| President | (Albania) Agim Demrozi |
| Board member | (Albania) Agron Kalaja |
| Board member | (Albania) Idajet Roçi |
| Board member | (Albania) Gentian Gjuzi |
| Accountant | (Albania) Muhamed Kullolli |
| Shareholder | (Italy) Demrozi Costruzioni S.r.l. (37.5%) |
| Shareholder | (Italy) Foglia Engineering S.r.l. (37.5%) |
| Shareholder | (Albania) Rrogozhinë Municipality (25%) |

== World & European Rankings ==
(As of 13 August 2026)

=== UEFA club coefficient ranking ===
| Rank | Team | Points |
|---|---|---|
| 218 | (Norway) Viking FK | 4.500 |
| 219 | (Sweden) AIK | 4.500 |
| 220 | (Albania) KF Egnatia | 4.500 |
| 221 | (Lithuania) Kauno Žalgiris | 4.500 |
| 222 | (Kazakhstan) Ordabasy | 4.500 |

=== Title winning managers ===
| Name | Period | Trophies | | |
|---|---|---|---|---|
| (Albania) Edlir Tetova | 2023–2026 | Kategoria Superiore (2) 2023–24, 2024–25 | Albanian Cup:(2) 2022–23, 2023–24 | Albanian Supercup:(1) 2024 |
| (Albania) Nevil Dede | 2026– | Kategoria Superiore (1) 2025–26 | | |

== List of managers ==
- (Albania) Petrit Haxhia (– 2 Oct 2004)
- (Albania) Hysen Dedja (5 Oct 2004 – 4 Dec 2004)
- (Albania) Alfred Ferko (9 Dec 2004– 1 Jul 2005)
- (Albania) Eduart Thartori (25 Jan 2015 — 30 Jun 2015)
- (Albania) Vladimir Gjoni (1 Sep 2016 — 24 Oct 2018)
- (Albania) Ilir Duro (25 Oct 2018 — 29 Dec 2018)
- (Albania) Bledar Sinella (1 Jan 2019– 30 May 2019)
- (Albania) Ndriçim Kashami (4 Aug 2019 — 29 Oct 2019)
- (Albania) Artan Bano (30 Oct 2019 — 31 May 2020)
- (Albania) Eduart Thartori (1 Jun 2020 — 1 Jul 2020)
- (Albania) Gugash Magani (1 Jul 2020 — 21 Nov 2021)
- (Albania) Përparim Daiu (22 Nov 2021 — 6 Dec 2021)
- (North Macedonia) Zekirija Ramadani(6 Dec 2021—1 Jun 2022)
- (Albania) Edlir Tetova (4 Jun 2022 — 15 Oct 2022)
- (Albania) Shpëtim Duro (16 Oct 2022 — 27 Jan 2023)
- (Albania) Edlir Tetova (30 Jan 2023 — 3 May 2026)
- (Albania) Julian Brahja (14 Apr 2026 — 4 May 2026)
- (Albania) Nevil Dede (4 May 2026 — )

== See also ==
- Besa Kavajë
- Luzi United
- Golemi
