= Serxho Ujka =

Albanian footballer

Personal information
- Full name: Serxho Ujka
- Date of birth: 27 August 1998 (age 28)
- Place of birth: Lezhë, Albania
- Height: 1.90 m (6 ft 3 in)
- Position: Midfielder

Team information
- Current team: Zulte Waregem
- Number: 36

Youth career
- 2012-2017: Brians
- 2017-2018: Laçi

Senior career*
Years	Team	Apps	(Gls)
2017–2018	Laçi	2	(0)
2017–2018	→ Shënkolli (loan)	13	(2)
2018–2019	Shënkolli	13	(0)
2019–2021	Bylis Ballsh	57	(1)
2021–2024	Laçi	85	(12)
2024–2025	Egnatia	34	(6)
2025–	Zulte Waregem	15	(1)

International career^{‡}
2022–	Albania	1	(0)
- * Club domestic league appearances and goals as of 11 May 2026 ‡ National team caps and goals as of 22:37, 11 November 2022 (UTC)

Serxho Ujka (born 27 August 1998) is an Albanian footballer who plays as a midfielder for Zulte Waregem in the Belgian Pro League.

== Honours ==
Egnatia

- Kategoria Superiore: 2024–25
- Albanian Supercup: 2025
