= Edlir Tetova =

Albanian footballer

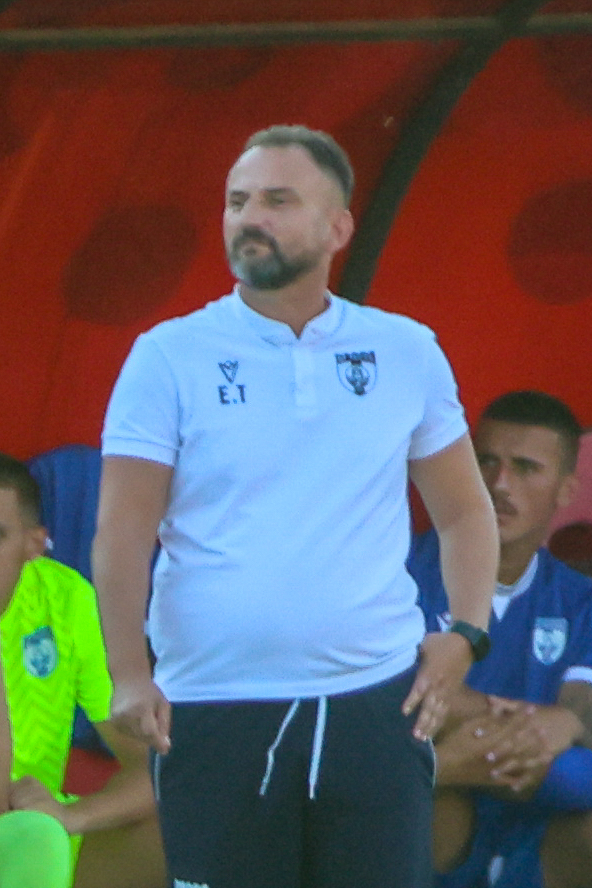

Personal information
- Full name: Edlir Tetova
- Date of birth: 14 April 1983 (age 43)
- Place of birth: Durrës, PSR Albania
- Height: 1.83 m (6 ft 0 in)
- Positions: Left-back; left midfielder

Team information
- Current team: Teuta (manager)

Senior career*
Years	Team	Apps	(Gls)
2001–2005	Teuta	63	(2)
2005–2006	Elbasani	32	(4)
2006–2007	Teuta	29	(0)
2007–2008	Elbasani	19	(0)
2008–2009	Besa	13	(0)
2009–2010	Kamza	15	(0)
2010	Partizani	12	(0)
Total		183	(6)

International career
1999	Albania U16	2	(0)
2001	Albania U19	3	(0)
2003–2005	Albania U21	9	(0)

Managerial career
- 2018–2019: Skënderbeu (assistant)
- 2020: Kukësi (assistant)
- 2021: Tirana (assistant)
- 2021–2022: Ulpiana
- 2022: Egnatia
- 2022: Lushnja
- 2023−2026: Egnatia
- 2026−: Teuta
- * Club domestic league appearances and goals

Edlir Tetova (born 14 April 1983) is an Albanian professional football coach and former player who is the current manager of Teuta.

== Club career ==
He has spent most of his career in the Kategoria Superiore with Teuta, Elbasani and Besa. His natural position was left midfielder, but he could also play as a left back when needed.

== Managerial career ==
He won his first league title as a coach in the 2023-24 Kategoria Superiore, guiding KF Egnatia to its first-ever Albanian championship. With the same club, he had won the 2022-23 Albanian Cup a year earlier and repeated the feat in the 2023-24 Albanian Cup, achieving the double.

He retained the league title in the 2024-25 Kategoria Superiore and lost the 2024-25 Albanian Cup final against FC Dinamo City on penalties, narrowly missing a second double in a row. He won the first five major titles in Egnatia's history.

On 18 March 2026, he was suspended for six months by the Disciplinary Committee of the Albanian Football Federation for violating the principles of fair play by withdrawing his team in the match against KF Vllaznia. On April 16, The Appeals Committee of the Albanian Football Federation (AFHF) reduced the punishment of Tetova from six months to three months. One day later, Tetova announced that he would be leaving the club at the end of the season. However, the decision became effective ahead of schedule and he ended up leaving the club on 3 May 2026 after Egnatia recorded four consecutive defeats in the league although they had secured participation in the Final Four and the Albanian Cup final.

On 29 May 2026, he was appointed manager of his former club Teuta.

== Honours ==
=== Manager ===
Egnatia

- Kategoria Superiore: 2023–24, 2024–25
- Albanian Cup: 2022–23, 2023–24
- Albanian Supercup: 2024
