= 2024 Albanian Supercup =

Egnatia	Kukësi
2	0
- Date: 26 December 2024
- Venue: Arena Kombëtare, Tirana
- Referee: Daniel Vrapi

The 2024 Albanian Supercup was the 31th edition of the Albanian Supercup, an annual Albanian football match. The teams were decided by taking the trophy winners of the previous season's Kategoria Superiore champions and the winners of the Albanian Cup. Since Egnatia won both competitions, they will play against the runner-up of the cup.

The match was contested by Egnatia, champions of the 2023–24 Kategoria Superiore, and Kukësi, the 2023–24 Albanian Cup runner-up.

== Details ==
26 December 2024
19:00 CET

Egnatia	2–0	Kukësi
Ujka 19'; Bakayoko 84'

Arena Kombëtare, Tirana
Referee: Daniel Vrapi

Match officials:
Assistant referees:
Ediena Kapxhiu
Ilir Tartaraj
Fourth official:
Juxhin Xhaja
Video Assistant Referee:
Kreshnik Barjamaj
Assistant video assistant referee:
Kreshnik Cjapi

Match rules

- 90 minutes
- 30 minutes extra-time if the scores still level
- Penalty shoot-out if scores still level
- Six named substitutes, of which three may be used and additional fourth if extra-time is played

== See also ==
- 2023–24 Kategoria Superiore
- 2023–24 Albanian Cup
