= Ilir Duro =

Albanian footballer

Personal information
- Date of birth: 25 July 1966 (age 60)
- Place of birth: Kavajë, Albania
- Position: Forward

Senior career*
Years	Team	Apps	(Gls)
- Besa
1993–1994	Freiburger FC	7	(1)

Managerial career
- 2005: Besa
- 2017: Luz i Vogël 2008
- 2018: Egnatia
- * Club domestic league appearances and goals

Ilir Duro (born 25 July 1966) is an Albanian football manager and former player. He played as a forward for Besa Kavajë, Dinamo Tirana and Freiburger FC. He served as head coach of Besa Kavajë in the Albanian Superliga and the Albania national under-19 football team

== Managerial career ==
He left Egnatia in January 2019.
