= Xhuliano Skuka =

Albanian footballer

Personal information
- Date of birth: 2 August 1998 (age 28)
- Place of birth: Dibër, Albania
- Height: 1.82 m (6 ft 0 in)
- Position: Forward

Team information
- Current team: Partizani
- Number: 10

Youth career
- 2012–2016: FC Devant-les-Ponts

Senior career*
Years	Team	Apps	(Gls)
2017–2021	Korabi	73	(37)
2021–2022	Dinamo Tirana	13	(1)
2022–2023	Partizani	37	(19)
2023–2024	Metz	9	(0)
2023	Metz B	1	(1)
2023	→ Maribor (loan)	13	(1)
2024	→ Partizani (loan)	17	(4)
2024–2025	Penafiel	6	(0)
2025	Politehnica Iași	14	(3)
2025–	Partizani	19	(4)
2025–	Partizani B	2	(0)

International career^{‡}
2022	Albania	4	(1)
- * Club domestic league appearances and goals as of 13 May 2026 ‡ National team caps and goals as of 19 November 2022

Xhuliano Skuka (born 2 August 1998) is an Albanian professional footballer who plays as a forward for Kategoria Superiore club Partizani.

== Club career ==
In January 2023, Skuka joined Ligue 2 club Metz from Partizani on a contract until the summer of 2026.

== Career statistics ==
=== International ===
As of match played 19 November 2022

Appearances and goals by national team and year
National team	Year	Apps	Goals
Albania	2022	4	1
Total		4	1

Scores and results list Albania's goal tally first, score column indicates score after each Skuka goal.

List of international goals scored by Xhuliano Skuka
No.	Date	Venue	Opponent	Score	Result	Competition
1	19 November 2022	Arena Kombëtare, Tirana, Albania	Armenia	1–0	2–0	Friendly
