= Enkeleid Dobi =

Albanian footballer (born 1975)

Personal information
- Full name: Enkeleid Dobi
- Date of birth: 23 May 1975 (age 51)
- Place of birth: Durrës, Albania
- Height: 1.85 m (6 ft 1 in)
- Position: Forward

Youth career
- Teuta

Senior career*
Years	Team	Apps	(Gls)
1992–1996	Teuta	72	(17)
1997–1998	Varteks	2	(0)
1998–1999	Beltinci	9	(2)
1999–2000	NK Varteks	7	(1)
2000–2002	Zagłębie Lubin	51	(6)
2003	Górnik Zabrze	8	(0)
2003–2005	Viry-Châtillon	58	(29)
2005–2006	Ste Geneviève Sp	20	(1)
2006–2009	Viry-Châtillon	5	(0)
2009	Fleury-Mérogis		
2010	Viry-Châtillon	1	(0)
2010	Miedź Legnica	8	(2)
2011–2012	Stal Chocianów	25	(9)
2013	Odra Chobienia		
Total		260+	(67+)

International career
1995–2003	Albania	6	(1)

Managerial career
- 2017–2020: Górnik Polkowice
- 2020–2021: Widzew Łódź
- 2022: Kukësi
- 2023–2024: Górnik Polkowice
- 2025–2026: Teuta
- * Club domestic league appearances and goals

Enkeleid Dobi (born 23 May 1975) is an Albanian professional football manager and former player. He played for clubs in Albania, Croatia, Slovenia, Poland and France, as well as the Albania national team.

== Club career ==
Dobi played as forward for NK Varteks in the Croatian First League. He played for Zagłębie Lubin and Górnik Zabrze in the Polish Ekstraklasa during 2004.

== International career ==
He scored the second goal in his country's 2–0 victory against Bosnia and Herzegovina in November 1995, in what was Bosnia's first official match as an independent nation after affiliating with FIFA. It was also his debut for Albania and he earned a total of 6 caps, scoring 1 goal. His final international was a February 2003 friendly match against Vietnam.

== Managerial career ==
After working as youth coach at Zagłębie Lubin's academy, Dobi took on his first managerial role on 12 January 2017, when he took charge of III liga club Górnik Polkowice. He led the team for three-and-a-half years, taking them to II liga after winning group III of the 2018–19 III liga.

On 30 July 2020, he signed a one-year contract with Polish I liga club Widzew Łódź. With ten regular season games left to play, and Widzew placed one point short of a promotion play-off-qualifying position, he was dismissed on 13 April 2021.

In September 2022, Dobi returned to Albania to manage Kategoria Superiore club Kukësi. He left the club on 11 December 2022.

On 5 September 2023, he was again appointed manager of recently relegated Górnik Polkowice. After winning just one out of seven opening games of the 2024–25 season, Dobi was dismissed on 9 September 2024.

== Career statistics ==
=== International ===
Appearances and goals by national team and year
National team	Year	Apps	Goals
Albania
Albania	1995	1	1
Albania	2000	1	0
Albania	2001	1	0
Albania	2002	2	0
Albania	2003	1	0
Total		6	1

== Managerial statistics ==
As of match played 3 May 2026

Team	From	To	Record							
Team	From	To	G	W	D	L	GF	GA	GD	Win %
Górnik Polkowice	12 January 2017	30 June 2020	125	72	21	32	277	150	+127	57.60
Widzew Łódź	30 June 2020	13 April 2021	26	10	8	8	26	25	+1	38.46
Kukësi	12 September 2022	11 December 2022	11	5	1	5	13	10	+3	45.45
Górnik Polkowice	5 September 2023	9 September 2024	40	18	9	13	72	57	+15	45.00
KF Teuta	1 July 2025	3 May 2026	37	9	15	13	31	36	−5	24.32
Total			239	114	54	71	419	278	+141	47.70

== Honours ==
=== Manager ===
Górnik Polkowice

- III liga, group III: 2018–19
- Polish Cup (Legnica regionals): 2023–24
