= Walid Jarmouni =

French footballer (born 2000)

Personal information
- Date of birth: 20 May 2000 (age 26)
- Place of birth: Montpellier, France
- Height: 1.89 m (6 ft 2 in)
- Position: Forward

Team information
- Current team: Hassania d'Agadir
- Number: 99

Senior career*
Years	Team	Apps	(Gls)
2018–2022	Sochaux II	27	(9)
2020–2022	Sochaux	4	(0)
2021–2022	→ Sète (loan)	23	(5)
2022–2023	Pau	6	(0)
2022–2023	Pau II	9	(2)
2023	→ Paris 13 Atletico (loan)	5	(1)
2023–2024	Progrès Niederkorn	29	(12)
2024–2025	Tirana	33	(13)
2025–	Hassania d'Agadir	2	(0)
- * Club domestic league appearances and goals as of 1 June 2024

Walid Jarmouni (born 20 May 2000) is a French professional footballer who plays as a forward for club Hassania d'Agadir.

== Professional career ==
On 26 June 2020, Jarmouni signed his first professional contract with Sochaux. Jarmouni made his professional debut with Sochaux in a 2-1 Ligue 2 win over Troyes AC on 29 August 2020.

On 18 June 2021, he joined Sète on loan.

In June 2022, Jarmouni signed with Pau.

On 29 January 2023, Jarmouni was loaned to Paris 13 Atletico.

On 15 June 2023, Jarmouni signed a two-year contract with BGL Ligue club Progrès Niederkorn. He made his debut for Progrès Niederkorn in the first qualifying round of the UEFA Europa Conference League against the Kosovan team SC Gjilani.

== Personal life ==
Born in Montpellier, in the south of France, Jarmouni holds both French and Moroccan nationalities.
