= Skënder Gega =

Albanian footballer and coach

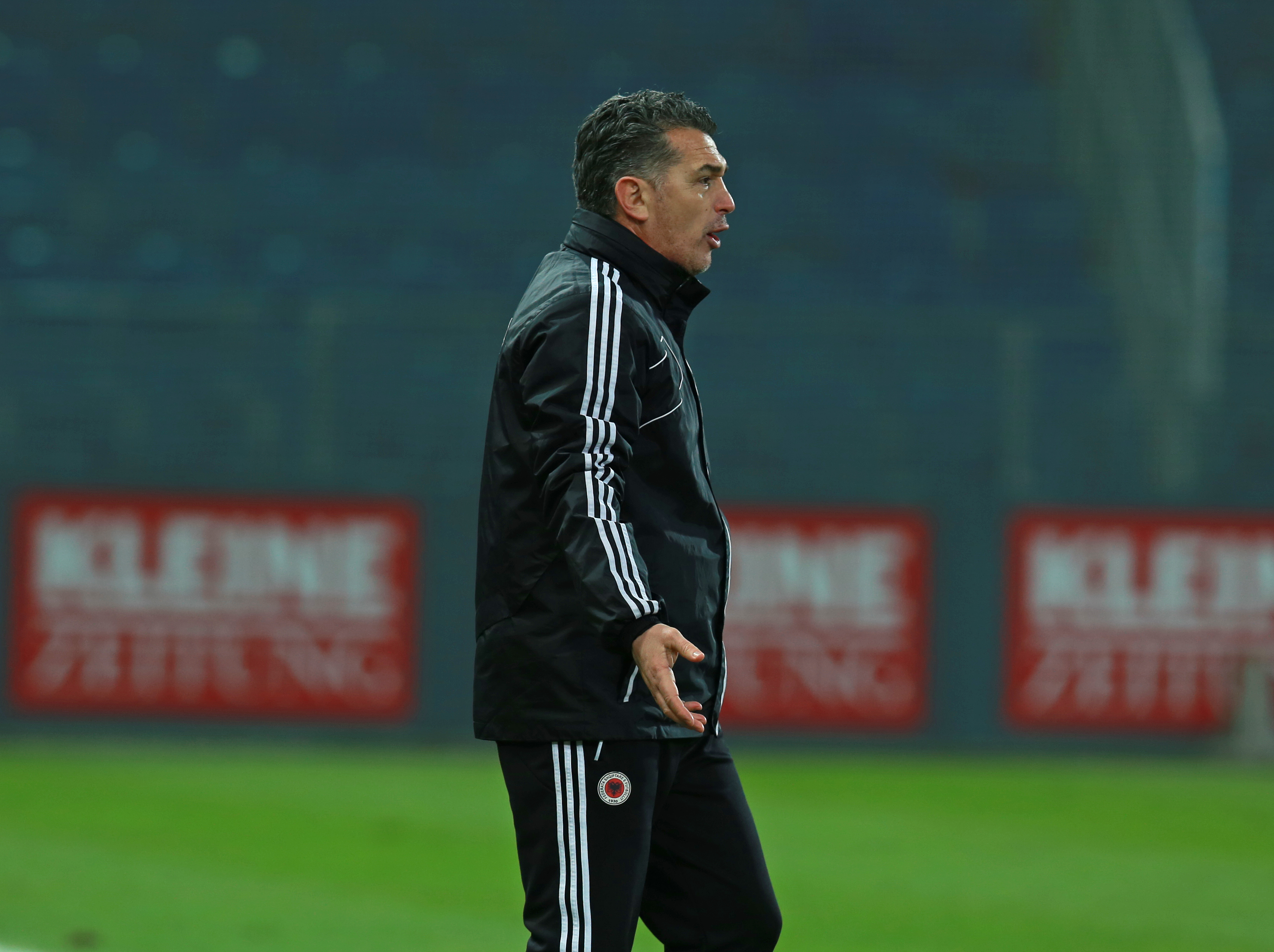
- Gega in 2014

Personal information
- Date of birth: 14 November 1963 (age 62)
- Place of birth: Tropojë, Albania
- Height: 1.82 m (6 ft 0 in)
- Position: Defender

Youth career
- –1983: Partizani Tirana

Senior career*
Years	Team	Apps	(Gls)
1983–1990	Partizani		
1992–1993	Sportfreunde Siegen		
1994–1996	Partizani	14	(1)

International career
1987	Albania U21	1	(0)
1987–1989	Albania	10	(0)

Managerial career
- 2007: USA women's U16 (assistant)
- 2008: USA women's U17 (assistant)
- 2008: Seton Hall Pirates (assistant)
- 2011: Albania U19
- 2011–2015: Albania U21
- 2015–2016: Al-Jahra
- 2018−2019: Partizani
- 2020: Kukësi
- 2022: Skënderbeu
- 2022: Kukësi
- 2025: Partizani
- * Club domestic league appearances and goals

Skënder Gega (born 14 November 1963) is an Albanian football manager and former player.

== Playing career ==
=== Club ===
Gega played the majority of his career at Partizani, an Albanian team, whilst also having a two-year stint with German side Sportfreunde Siegen between 1990 and 1994.

=== International ===
He made his debut for Albania in an April 1987 Euro Championship qualification match against Austria and earned a total of 10 caps, scoring no goals. His final international was an October 1989 FIFA World Cup qualification match against Sweden.

== Coaching career ==
He was appointed the head coach of the Albania under-19s in February 2011 where he remained until October 2011, when he was promoted to the head coach of the Albania under-21s.

During the summer of 2018, Gega joined Partizani Tirana, where he'd coach his team in the UEFA Europa League, Albanian Superliga, and the Albanian Cup. He won his first title as a manager, and the first for Partizani in 26 years. In June 2019, he left the club for personal reasons.

== Honours ==
=== As player ===
- Albanian Superliga: 1987

=== As coach ===
- Albanian Superliga: 2019
