= Gentian Mezani =

Albanian football coach (born 1979)

Personal information
- Date of birth: 13 October 1979 (age 47)
- Place of birth: Vlorë, Albania

Managerial career
- Years: Team
- 2013–2015: Flamurtari (U17)
- 2014: Flamurtari (assistant)
- 2015–2016: Flamurtari (U19)
- 2016–2017: Flamurtari
- 2017–2018: Laçi
- 2018–2019: Luftëtari
- 2019–2021: Gjilani
- 2022–2023: Laçi
- 2023–2024: Gjilani
- 2025: Bylis

Gentian Mezani (born 13 October 1979) is an Albanian football coach.

== Coaching career ==
=== Flamurtari Vlorë ===
Mezani was named the new coach of Flamurtari Vlorë on 25 October 2016 following the departure of Gugash Magani. The club administrator Sinan Idrizi stated that Mezani would remain coach of Flamurtari until the end of 2016–17 season. In his debut match two days later, Flamurtari drew Tërbuni Pukë 3–3 thanks to a last-minute equalizer by Tomislav Bušić in the first leg of 2016–17 Albanian Cup's second round. In the post-match interview, Mezani said that draw was a "fair result".

=== Managerial record ===
As of 22 December 2015

| Team | From | To | Record | | | | | |
| Team | From | To | G | W | D | L | Win % | Ref. |
|---|---|---|---|---|---|---|---|---|
| Flamurtari Vlorë | 25 October 2016 | Present | 12 | 6 | 3 | 3 | 50.00 | |
| Total | | | 12 | 6 | 3 | 3 | 50.00 | — |
