= Bledar Hodo =

Albanian footballer (born 1985)

Personal information
- Full name: Bledar Hodo
- Date of birth: 21 June 1985 (age 41)
- Place of birth: Durrës, Albania
- Height: 1.77 m (5 ft 9 1/2 in)
- Position: Midfielder

Youth career
- 2000–2004: Teuta

Senior career*
Years	Team	Apps	(Gls)
2004–2008	Teuta	55	(4)
2008–2009	Bylis	31	(0)
2009–2010	Teuta	32	(6)
2010–2011	Shkumbini	8	(0)
2011	Vllaznia	7	(1)
2011–2013	Tomori	36	(0)
2013–2017	Teuta	110	(2)

International career
2005–2006	Albania U21	7	(0)

Managerial career
- 2025: Teuta
- * Club domestic league appearances and goals as of 21 May 2017

Bledar Hodo (born 21 June 1985) is a former Albanian professional footballer.

== Club career ==
=== Teuta Durrës ===
On 1 February 2013, Hodo completed a transfer to Teuta as a free agent, returning to his boyhood club for the second time. His return debut came on 23 February in the 1–1 away draw against Tirana, playing full-90 minutes. Following this, he went on to make further 12 appearances, all of them as starter, as Teuta finished 3rd in the league, securing thus a spot in 2013–14 UEFA Europa League first qualifying round.

== Honours ==
Teuta Durrës

- Albanian Cup: 2004–05
