= Gazmend Demi =

Albanian businessman

President of FK Partizani
- Incumbent
- Assumed office January 2013
- Preceded by: Lulëzim Sallaku

Personal details
- Born: January 10, 1963 (age 63) Tirana, PR Albania
- Occupation: Businessman

Gazmend Demi (born January 10, 1963) is an Albanian businessman, who is currently the president of the Albanian football club Partizani.

== Personal life ==
Demi was born in Tirana to a Cham family from Filat. He contributed financially to the Kosovo Liberation Army during the Kosovo War and was awarded by the President of Kosovo, Hashim Thaci.
