= List of Albania national football team managers =

The Albania national football team was first established in 1930 following the creation of Albanian Football Federation on the same year. The first ever manager of the team was Ljubiša Broćić who guided Albania in the first international matches in 1946. Since then, 27 other managers have been in charge of Albania, with Gianni De Biasi being more successful, leading the team to their second ever UEFA European Championship participation in 2016 after the Euros in 1964. The current manager of the Albania national team is Italian manager Rolando Maran who assumed charge in 2026.

== List of managers ==
This is a chronological list of the managers who have guided Albania since 1946.

No.	Name	From	To	Record					Stint
No.	Name	From	To	G	W	D	L	Win %	Stint
1.	(Socialist Federal Republic of Yugoslavia) Ljubiša Broćić	22 August 1946	13 October 1946	4	3	0	1	75.00	1st
2.	(Albania) Adem Karapici	25 May 1947		1	0	0	1	0.00	1st
3.	(Socialist Federal Republic of Yugoslavia) Ljubiša Broćić	15 June 1947	20 August 1947	2	0	0	2	0.00	2nd
4.	(Albania) Adem Karapici	14 September 1947	27 June 1948	4	1	1	2	25.00	2nd
5.	(Albania) Sllave Llambi	23 October 1949	17 November 1949	3	0	2	1	0.00	—N/a
6.	(Albania) Ludovik Jakova	29 October 1949	8 October 1950	6	1	1	4	16.67	—N/a
7.	(Albania) Myslym Alla	29 November 1952	7 December 1952	2	2	0	0	100.00	1st
8.	(Hungary) Miklós Vadas	29 November 1953		1	1	0	0	100.00	—N/a
9.	(Soviet Union) Nikolay Lyukshinov	1956	1957	—N/a					
10.	(Albania) Loro Boriçi	15 September 1957	29 June 1963	7	2	1	4	28.57	1st
11.	(Albania) Zyber Konçi	30 October 1963	7 May 1965	7	1	1	5	14.29	1st
12.	(Albania) Loro Boriçi	24 November 1965	21 June 1972	14	1	3	10	7.14	2nd
13.	(Albania) Myslym Alla	29 October 1972	6 May 1973	3	0	0	3	0.00	2nd
14.	(Albania) Ilia Shuke	10 October 1973	8 November 1973	3	1	1	1	33.33	—N/a
15.	(Albania) Loro Boriçi	3 November 1976		1	1	0	0	100.00	3rd
16.	(Albania) Zyber Konçi	3 September 1980	6 December 1980	4	1	0	3	25.00	2nd
17.	(Albania) Loro Boriçi	1 April 1981	18 November 1981	4	0	0	4	0.00	4th
18.	(Albania) Shyqyri Rreli	22 September 1982	30 May 1985	14	1	4	9	7.14	1st
19.	(Albania) Agron Sulaj	30 October 1985	18 November 1987	7	0	1	6	0.00	1st
20.	(Albania) Shyqyri Rreli	6 August 1988	15 November 1989	9	0	2	7	0.00	2nd
21.	(Albania) Bejkush Birçe	30 May 1990		1	0	0	1	0.00	1st
22.	(Albania) Agron Sulaj	5 September 1990	19 December 1990	3	0	0	3	0.00	2nd
23.	(Albania) Bejkush Birçe	30 March 1991	14 May 1994	19	3	2	14	15.79	2nd
24.	(Albania) Neptun Bajko	7 September 1994	14 December 1996	17	3	4	10	17.65	—N/a
25.	(Albania) Astrit Hafizi	29 March 1997	9 October 1999	23	3	6	14	13.04	—N/a
26.	(Albania) Medin Zhega	6 February 2000	6 June 2001	13	5	1	7	38.46	—N/a
27.	(Albania) Sulejman Demollari	1 September 2001	17 April 2002	9	3	1	5	33.33	—N/a
28.	(Italy) Giuseppe Dossena	12 October 2002	16 October 2002	2	0	1	1	0.00	—N/a
29.	(Germany) Hans-Peter Briegel	12 February 2003	22 March 2006	31	10	3	18	32.26	—N/a
30.	(Croatia) (Austria) Otto Barić	16 August 2006	17 October 2007	13	4	5	4	30.77	—N/a
31.	(Croatia) (Austria) Slavko Kovačić	17 November 2007	21 November 2007	2	0	0	2	0.00	Caretaker
32.	(Netherlands) Arie Haan	27 May 2008	1 April 2009	10	2	4	4	20.00	—N/a
33.	(Croatia) Josip Kuže	6 June 2009	11 October 2011	24	8	5	11	33.33	—N/a
34.	(Bosnia and Herzegovina) Džemal Mustedanagić	11 November 2011	15 November 2011	2	0	1	1	0.00	Caretaker
35.	(Italy) (Albania) Gianni De Biasi	29 February 2012	14 June 2017	54	21	12	21	38.89	—N/a
36.	(Italy) Christian Panucci	19 July 2017	23 March 2019	15	4	2	9	26.67	—N/a
37.	(Albania) Ervin Bulku (Albania) Sulejman Mema	23 March 2019	17 April 2019	1	1	0	0	100.00	Caretaker
38.	(Italy) (Slovenia) Edoardo Reja	17 April 2019	30 November 2022	38	14	9	15	36.84	—N/a
39.	(Brazil) (Albania) Sylvinho	1 January 2023	19 May 2026	31	15	7	9	48.39	—N/a
40.	(Italy) Rolando Maran	19 May 2026	Present	6	3	0	3	50.00	—N/a
