= Erjon Bogdani =

Albanian football manager and player (born 1977)

Personal information
- Date of birth: 14 April 1977 (age 49)
- Place of birth: Tirana, PSR Albania
- Height: 1.91 m (6 ft 3 in)
- Position: Forward

Team information
- Current team: Mantova 1911 (assistant sporting director)

Youth career
- 1987–1994: Partizani Tirana

Senior career*
Years	Team	Apps	(Gls)
1994–1997	Partizani Tirana	69	(21)
1998	Gençlerbirliği	11	(1)
1998–2000	NK Zagreb	26	(8)
2000–2004	Reggina	70	(11)
2003–2004	→ Salernitana (loan)	38	(8)
2004–2005	Verona	38	(17)
2005–2007	Siena	49	(13)
2007–2010	Chievo	61	(8)
2007–2008	→ Livorno (loan)	17	(2)
2010–2012	Cesena	49	(8)
2012–2013	Siena	29	(6)
Total		468	(103)

International career
1996–1998	Albania U21	8	(2)
1997	Albania U23	1	(1)
1996–2013	Albania	75	(18)

Managerial career
- 2015–2016: Albania (assistant)
- 2016–2018: Albania U19
- * Club domestic league appearances and goals

Erjon Bogdani (Albanian pronunciation: [ˈɛrjɔn bɔɡˈdani]; born 14 April 1977) is an Albanian professional football coach and former player, who played as a forward. He is also known by the nicknames "Bogu" and "Er-Bomber".

Regarded as one of the most successful Albanian players of his generation, Bogdani began his senior career with Partizani Tirana in 1994 where he debuted at the age of 16, before playing for Gençlerbirliği in Turkey and Zagreb in Croatia, and later establishing himself in Italy, where he spent the majority of his career.

He competed extensively in Serie A and Serie B, representing several Italian clubs including Reggina, Salernitana, Hellas Verona, A.C. Siena, Chievo, Livorno and Cesena.

During this period, he was known for his physical style of play and aerial ability, recording multiple double-digit scoring seasons, scoring decisive goals in promotion and relegation campaigns, and registering a Serie A hat-trick during the 2005–06 Serie A season.

He became a free agent in May 2013 after his contract with Siena ran out, and retired from the sport in February 2014.

Bogdani has 75 caps for Albania national team, making his debut in 1996 and scoring his first goal three years later. With 18 goals, he is Albania's all-time top goalscorer, overtaking his former teammate Alban Bushi in 2011 by netting his 15th goal. He holds numerous Albanian records, including most goals as substitute and oldest goalscoring in history, and has been dubbed as the best striker to play for the Red and Black.

Following his retirement, Bogdani was initially appointed by Albanian Football Association as a youth talents scouter, starting the job in September 2014. He began his managerial career by being named Gianni De Biasi assistant in August 2015. In December 2016, he was named manager of Albania under-19 team.

In 2022 he returned to Italy serving as head of youth scouting for Palermo.

Since October 2025, he has served as assistant sporting director at Italian club Mantova 1911.

== Early life ==
Erjon Bogdani was born on 14 April 1977 in Tirana, Albania, together with his twin brother, Adrian to parents Fatmir Bogdani, a math teacher and Pranvera Bogdani, a historian. He grew up in the capital and attended the “Avni Rustemi” school. Both brothers were initially noted for their height and were considered promising in basketball. Bogdani developed a passion for football and by the age of 7, he participated in school-level sports competitions of football. He was first noticed by coach Ilir Spahiu, who approached him at Partizani Tirana. He progressed through the club’s youth levels and in 1994 signed his first professional contract with the club managed by Sulejman Starova.

== Club career ==
=== Early career in Albania and Turkey ===
Bogdani made his professional debut with Partizani Tirana in the Albanian Superliga, playing seven games in the second half of the 1993–94 season. In the following season, 1994–95, he scored his first goals in a campaign which saw him play 13 games in which he scored twice.

He made his UEFA competition debut on 10 August 1995 in the 1995–96 UEFA Cup preliminary round against Fenerbahçe, coming on as a 75th-minute substitute in a 2–0 away defeat. In the 1995–96 Albanian National Championship season, he made 20 league appearances and scored seven goals.

In the 1996–97 season, Bogdani made 14 league appearances in the Albanian Superliga, scoring seven goals. Bogdani also appeared in the 1997 Albanian Cup final, playing 97 minutes in the 2–2 draw after extra time against Flamurtari, as Partizani won the trophy 4–3 on penalties.

The 1997–98 campaign was his most prolific goalscoring campaign in Albania, as he scored 13 goals in 15 league appearances before the winter break.

During a training camp with the Albania national team in Turkey in January 1998, Bogdani attracted the interest of Gençlerbirliği, which led to his transfer to the club during the winter transfer window for $100.000, a then-record fee for Albanian football.

He played in the second half of the 1997–98 1.Lig season, making 11 league appearances and scoring one goal.

He debutted with goal on 8 February 1998 in a 2–1 away win against Dardanelspor.

He then left Turkey and returned in Albania, joining Dinamo Tirana, where his twin Adrian was also part. He remained at the club only for a half season.

=== Zagreb ===
After his brief spell with Dinamo Tirana, Bogdani moved to Croatia, joining Zagreb in the Prva HNL. His transfer was facilitated by coach Josip Kuže.

In the second-half of the 1998–99 Prva HNL in total he played 14 games scoring 6 goals.

In the first-half of 1999–2000 Prva HNL, he played 12 games, scoring two goals.

=== Reggina ===
Bogdani was transferred to Italy during the winter break in late January 2000, joining Reggina signing a three-year contract. Although deployed as a centre-forward at Reggina, Bogdani was often noted for prioritising team play and overall contribution over individual goal statistics, particularly during the club’s return to Serie A.

He gradually became involved in the first team during the second half of the 1999–2000 Serie A season, making his league debut on 6 February 2000 against Bologna, coming on as a substitute in the 55th minute.

As the season progressed, Bogdani often featured in the starting lineup and he went on to make a total of 10 Serie A appearances during the remainder of the season, scoring two goals. His first goal for the club came in a 1–0 home win against Venezia on 9 April 2000, followed by another goal later on 7 May 2000 in a 1–1 draw against Hellas Verona. Reggina finished the 1999–2000 season in 10th place.

During the 2000–01 Serie A, Bogdani featured intermittently making a total of 17 league appearances, including six starts. He scored once during the campaign, with his only goal coming on 12 November 2000 in a 2–1 away defeat against Roma. Reggina finished the season third from bottom and entered the relegation tie-breaker, where the club was defeated and subsequently relegated to Serie B.

Following Reggina's relegation, Bogdani remained with the club for the 2001–02 Serie B season.

Early in the campaign, he was primarily used as a substitute, but scored in consecutive matches against UC Sampdoria and in the stoppage time against AS Cittadella, both 2–0 victores. He followed with another second-half goal in a 1–0 against Cosenza.

He later enjoyed a run of regular starts and scored other goals, most notably in two narrow wins against Crotone on 3 November 2001, and against Pistoiese on 19 December.

He collected 30 league appearances, playing approximately 1,400 minutes and scoring a tota of seven goals. Reggina placed third and secured promotion back to Serie A.

During the 2002–03 Serie A season, Bogdani made 10 league appearances for Reggina, as his campaign was significantly limited by injury, which sidelined him for several months between November and March.

He scored his only goal of the season on 23 October 2002 in a 2–1 home victory against Torino.

Reggina finished the season in the relegation zone but retained their Serie A status after winning the relegation tie-breaker against Atalanta.

In the summer of 2003, Bogdani left Reggina on loan to Salernitana, after the club signed Roberto Stellone from Napoli for the centre-forward position.

Initially deployed in a two-striker system by head coach Stefano Pioli alongside Alessandro Tulli, Bogdani later became Salernitana’s lone centre-forward, supported by Davide Bombardini and Giorgio Di Vicino. He delivered consistent performances throughout the season, scoring eight goals in 38 appearances.

Among his most notable goals were the match-winning header in a 1–0 derby victory against Avellino on 15 October 2003, and later a brace on 25 January 2004 in a 2–0 away win against Palermo, where the latter defeat also led to the dismissal of Palermo head coach Silvio Baldini shortly after the match. Salernitana was ranked 17th in the table avoiding relegation.

After the end of the season, Bogdani returned to Reggina, but departed the club after four and a half years to continue his career with Hellas Verona.

=== Hellas Verona ===
In the 2004–05 season, Bogdani signed with Hellas Verona, competing in the 2004–05 Serie B. Under head coach Massimo Ficcadenti, he made 38 league appearances, most of them as a starter, completing 33 full 90-minute matches.

Bogdani experienced his most productive spell during the winter months, contributing regularly with important goals. His goal output declined in the latter part of the campaign, where he scored only three goals in the final 19 league appearances. Despite this, his overall season was regarded as positive, as he also provided important contributions through his link-up play and physical presence in attack.

He finished the season as Hellas Verona’s top scorer with 17 goals and ranked fourth overall in the Serie B scoring charts, three goals behind top scorer Gionatha Spinesi and two behind Diego Milito and Francesco Tavano. Hellas Verona finished the season in seventh place in the league standings.

=== Siena ===
In the summer of 2005, Bogdani returned to Serie A, signing with Siena. He made his debut for the club on 28 August 2005 in a 2–1 home victory against Cagliari, playing the full 90 minutes.

He scored his first goal for Siena on 21 September 2005 against Ascoli, opening the scoring in a 1–1 away draw with a goal just before half-time.

On 2 October 2005, Bogdani provided the assist for the winning goal in a 3–2 away victory against Roma, scored in the final minute of the match.

On 10 December 2005, Bogdani scored the only goal of the match in a 1–0 home win against Empoli, netting in the second minute.

On 28 January 2006, Bogdani scored his first hat-trick in Serie A, netting all three goals in a 3–1 away victory against Palermo at the Stadio Renzo Barbera. Bogdani opened the scoring in the 29th minute before adding two further goals in the second half, completing his hat-trick by the 66th minute; the result also led to the dismissal of Palermo head coach Luigi Delneri later that day.

On 11 March 2006, Bogdani scored a late header in a 1–0 home win against Treviso; the result temporarily moved Siena up to eighth place in the standings.

During the final weeks of the season, Bogdani scored additional goals sending his tally to 11 goals in 34 appearances, but Siena however failed to record any win in their final nine league matches and dropped to 15th place in the final standings of 2005–06 Serie A season.

Italian press highlighted his impact during the season, noting that his goal return and physical presence played an important role in Siena’s attacking play, particularly during the second half of the campaign, which attracted interest from other Serie A clubs ahead of the following season.

In July 2006 Bogdani was close to a transfer to Udinese, with the move viewed as a potential replacement amid the expected departure of Vincenzo Iaquinta, who had recently won the 2006 FIFA World Cup.

Bogdani remained with Siena for the start of the following campaign and featured in the opening round of the 2006–07 Coppa Italia, netting the winning goal in extra time in a 2–1 away victory against Carpenedolo on 20 August 2006, which allowed Siena to advance to the next round of the competition. Bogdani featured also in the opening match of the 2006–07 Serie A season, a 2–1 away victory against Chievo on 10 September 2006.

During the first half of the 2006–07 Serie A season, Siena enjoyed a strong start to the campaign, with Bogdani featuring regularly, managing to score a brace late in the game against Parma on 4 November 2006 to secure Siena a 2–2 draw, a result which temporarily lifted the club to fourth place in the league standings.

He made 15 Serie A appearances and scored two goals for Siena during the first half of the 2006–07 season before leaving the club.

=== Chievo Verona ===
On 11 January 2007, Bogdani was transferred to Chievo Verona for an undisclosed fee, as the club sought to strengthen its squad during the second half of the 2006–07 Serie A season. He signed a three-and-a-half-year contract with the club, and was assigned the number 81 shirt.

He made his debut for Chievo three days later, starting in a league match against Catania finished in the 2–1 victory. He established himself as a regular starter under coach Luigi Delneri, starting 16 of the club’s 19 league matches in the second-half.

He scored twice on 24 February 2007 against Torino in a 3–0 home victory. Following the match, Torino dismissed head coach, and Bogdani was referred as a "coach killer" since was the third time when after Bogdani's goals, opposing managers were dismissed; he was also named in the Serie A Team of the Week for that round. He scored again four days later, netting once in a 2–2 away draw against Roma. After the match, Roma head coach Fabio Capello praised Bogdani’s headed goal, stating that it "enhanced the atmosphere at the Stadio Olimpico".

On 18 March 2007, Bogdani scored in a 2–0 away victory over Cagliari.

On 22 April 2007, Bogdani scored in the 76th minute against Livorno, giving Chievo a 2–1 lead after coming from behind, and bringing his total to five goals for the season.

In the penultimate round of the season, Bogdani provided the assist for the winning goal in a 1–0 home victory over Ascoli.

Despite Bogdani's goals and assists, Chievo finished third from bottom and were relegated to Serie B, collecting 39 points, one point behind a group of four teams on 40 points, with relegation confirmed on the final matchday following a 2–0 defeat to Catania one of direct rivals.

==== Loan to Livorno ====
On 31 August 2007, in the final day of the summer transfer window, Bogdani joined Livorno on loan, remaining in Serie A. Prior to the move, Bogdani had been linked with a transfer to Roma, but Livorno secured his signing on a one-year loan with an option to buy after a late bid on deadline day. Bogdani's loan and wages cost Livorno approximately €2 million during the 2007–08 season.

He made his debut for Livorno on 2 September 2007 in a 4–2 home defeat against Palermo, coming on as a substitute for Francesco Tavano in the 36th minute.

During late autumn, Livorno recorded league victories against Reggina and Siena, both former clubs of Bogdani, scoring three goals in each match, with Bogdani involved in the build-up to the goals.

Bogdani scored his first goal of the season on 27 January 2008 in a 3–1 home defeat against Juventus. In the early second half of the season, Livorno were placed 13th in the Serie A standings.

Bogdani scored his second goal for Livorno against Reggina on 19 March 2008 in a 1–1 home draw.

Livorno struggled for consistency during the second half of the 2007–08 season, recording a limited number of wins and draws, losing several matches as they were relegated to Serie B after were ranked in the last place of the table. Bogdani registered 28 appearances, including 13 starts and only two goals.

==== Return to Chievo ====
Bogdani returned to Chievo for the 2008–09 Serie A season. He made 21 appearances, 12 as a starter.

He scored only one goal during the entire season, against Lazio on 15 March 2009, in a 0–3 victory, where he came on as a substitute due to an injury to Stephen Makinwa in the 20th minute and scored the opening goal in the 27th minute.

Bogdani started the 2009–10 season by scoring in Chievo's 3–0 Coppa Italia win over Mantova on 15 August 2009, helping the team advance to the next round.

In the 2009–10 Serie A, Bogdani repeated the same statistics as the previous season, making 12 appearances as a starter and 9 as a substitute.

On 20 September 2009 against Genoa, Bogdani started the match, winning a penalty in the 4th minute that was converted by Michele Marcolini and scoring a goal himself two minutes later. Chievo won 3–1.

Due to a dispute with coach Domenico Di Carlo he was not included in the four penultimate matches of the season.

During his time at Chievo, Bogdani made 66 appearances and scored nine goals in all competitions.

=== Cesena ===
On 22 July 2010, Bogdani signed as a free agent for newly promoted Serie A side Cesena for an undisclosed fee. He signed a contract until the end of the 2010–11 season, with an option for a further season.

Bogdani took squad number 70, and made his debut by starting in the goalless draw versus Roma in the opening matchday on 28 August.

His first score-sheet contributions came in his second appearance two weeks later in the 2–0 home win over Milan, netting the opener and also setting up Emanuele Giaccherini for the second. He was named "Man of the match" for his performance and followed this by scoring the winning goal against Lecce the following week.

He finished his first season at Cavallucci Marini with 8 goals in 35 league appearances, finishing as the club's second-highest goalscorer, one goal behind Luis Jiménez. It was his highest tally since the 2005–06 season.

Bogdani lost his starting place in the following season after the arrival of Adrian Mutu, but he still made several appearances in Mutu's absence, particularly in the 2011–12 Coppa Italia matches.

He scored his first goal of the season on 21 August in the third round of Coppa Italia (Section 8), netting the winner against Ascoli in the 119th minute after coming on as a substitute in the 106th minute.

Bogdani's second goal came in the next Coppa Italia match against Gubbio, scoring the opening goal from a penalty in a 3–0 home win, which allowed Cesena to progress to the round of 16.

After making only 13 appearances in the 2011–12 Serie A during the first part of the season, Bogdani was reportedly close to leaving the club in January 2012 during the winter transfer window.

The arrival of Vincenzo Iaquinta on loan from Juventus added further competition to Cesena's attacking line and led Bogdani to accept Siena's request for a transfer.

=== Return to Siena ===
Bogdani returned to Siena after four years, signing a two-year contract on the final day of the winter transfer window.

At the time, Bogdani was approaching his 35th birthday and was the oldest foreign striker active in Serie A.

He made his debut with the Tuscans on 22 February 2012, coming on as a substitute in the 65th minute in a 1–0 home defeat against Catania.

Bogdani then established himself in the starting line-up, scoring in three consecutive league matches against Palermo, Cagliari and Cesena. He continued to feature both as a starter and a substitute, adding another goal later in the season against Milan. Overall, he made 10 league appearances during the second half of the season, starting four matches and coming on as a substitute in six others.

He began the following season on 19 August 2012 starting in a 4–2 win over Vicenza in the third round of the 2012–13 Coppa Italia, coming off the field for Michele Paolucci in the 78th minute.

He started in the opening league match of the season on 26 August 2012 against Torino, coming off at half-time in a goalless draw.

Throughout the season, Bogdani made 18 league appearances, starting in three matches, as he was mainly used as a rotational player throughout the campaign, coming on several times from the bench.

He scored his first goal of the season on 31 October in a 4–2 defeat against Cagliari.

Bogdani scored his second goal of the season on 20 January 2013, netting the only goal in a 1–0 away victory against Sampdoria in the 63rd minute.

After his contract with Siena expired at the end of the 2012–13 season, Bogdani did not sign with any club during the 2013 summer transfer window.

On 11 February 2014, Bogdani confirmed his retirement from football.

== International career ==
=== Youth ===
==== Under-21 ====
Bogdani was first called up to the Albania under-21 team in 1996. He scored on his official debut in a 1998 UEFA European Under-21 Football Championship qualification match against Portugal on 9 October 1996. He was later sent off four minutes after scoring, receiving the first red card of his career, as Albania lost the match 4–2. Overall, he made seven official appearances and scored one goal as Albania finished fifth in Group 9.

==== Under-23 ====
Bogdani was called up to the Albania under-23 team by coach Sulejman Mema to participate in the 1997 Mediterranean Games football tournament, held in Southern Italy in June 1997. Albania were placed in Group B alongside Yugoslavia and Italy. Bogdani came on as a substitute for Mahir Halili against Yugoslavia and scored in the 60th minute, Albania's only goal in a 3–1 defeat. He was an unused substitute in the match against Italy.

=== Senior ===
==== 1996–2003: Beginnings ====
Bogdani was first called up to the Albania senior team by manager Neptun Bajko in April 1996 for a friendly match against Bosnia and Herzegovina. He made his debut as a late substitute in a goalless draw. Later that year, in December, he was included in the squad for a 1998 FIFA World Cup qualification match against Northern Ireland but remained an unused substitute in a 2–0 defeat at Windsor Park. His second appearance came on 19 August 1998 in a friendly match against Cyprus, where he again featured as a substitute.

Bogdani scored his first international goal on 10 February 1999 in a 2–0 friendly victory over Macedonia. He remained part of the squad during the UEFA Euro 2000 qualifying campaign under manager Astrit Hafizi, with Albania competing in Group 2. He made six appearances during the qualifying phase, including one start, as Albania finished fifth in the group with seven points.

During the 2002 FIFA World Cup qualification campaign, Bogdani made four appearances. He was not seen as starter by manager Medin Zhega before players such as Igli Tare, Alban Bushi and Altin Rraklli. He scored two goals on 15 November 2000 in a 3–0 home victory against Malta.

==== 2004–2005: Injury and return as protagonist ====
Bogdani missed most of the UEFA Euro 2004 qualifying campaign due to an injury sustained at club level. He was included in the squad only once, on 7 June 2003 against the Republic of Ireland, where he remained an unused substitute under coach Hans-Peter Briegel.

After an absence of over 18 months, Bogdani returned to the national team in February 2005 during the 2006 FIFA World Cup qualification campaign, appearing as a second-half substitute against Ukraine. He later started in subsequent matches, after a good run on club level, scoring against Denmark and Kazakhstan. He scored two goals in a 2–2 draw against Ukraine in the penultimate qualifying match, finishing the campaign with four goals making him top goalscorer of the team, as Albania placed fifth in Group 2, ahead of Georgia and Kazakhstan.

==== 2006–2009: Half-century caps and double-figures goals ====
Bogdani continued to lead Albania's attacking force in the UEFA Euro 2008 qualifying, playing 11 matches, all of them as starter, and was along with Altin Haxhi the most used player. He scored only once during the qualifiers, the temporary equalizer in an eventual 4–2 home defeat to Belarus on 17 November 2007 in the penultimate matchday of Group G. Albania failed once again to qualify at a major tournament as they finished Group G in 5th position with 11 points from 12 matches.

Bogdani played his first 2010 FIFA World Cup qualification match by scoring the opener against Malta, his 9th international goal, in an eventual 3–0 win at Qemal Stafa Stadium in the second match of Group 1. Later on 6 June 2009, Bogdani scored his 10th international goal against Portugal, becoming only the fifth player to achieve the feat. His goal however was only the temporary equalizer the minute after Portugal's opener, as Albania lost 1–2 at injury time. Bogdani made his 50th international appearance in the friendly versus Cyprus in August 2009, netting the third goal in a 6–1 home win which was Albania's largest ever victory. With this goal he overtook Igli Tare and Sokol Kushta to become Albania's 4th goalscorer of all time. Bogdani scored his next goal in the next qualifying match against Denmark to give Albania a 1–1 draw. It was the first time that Bogdani had scored in three consecutive matches. Albania finished Group 1 in 5th place with only 7 points and 6 goals scored, with Bogdani netting half of them.

==== 2010–2011: Albania top scorer, UEFA Euro 2012 qualifying ====
Bogdani began his UEFA Euro 2012 qualifying by playing as a starter in the opening Group D match versus Romania as Albania drew 1–1 at Stadionul Ceahlăul. It was also Albania's first draw versus Tricolorii since 1949 after 9 consecutive defeats. On 9 February 2011, Bogdani played in the 1–2 friendly loss to Slovenia, entering in Albania's top 10 appearance maker list. Later on 26 March 2011, Bogdani assisted Hamdi Salihi's winner against Belarus with a header to give Albania the 1–0 win at Qemal Stafa Stadium, the first ever against them. It was also Bogdani's 60 international appearance, overtaking Rudi Vata in the process.

Bogdani scored his first goal in the qualifiers on 2 September 2011 against the FIFA World Cup-winners France. With this goal Bogdani leveled Alban Bushi to become joint all-time top goalscorer of Albania with 14 goals. He broke the record four days later in the next qualifying match, a 2–1 away loss versus Luxembourg. In the post-match interview, Bogdani stated that he was considering retirement from the national team but changed his mind following a conversation with the Albanian Football Association president Armand Duka declaring that he will stay for another qualification campaign if the Albania national team needs him and of course if he would be in a good running form. He also described 2011 as one of the best years of his career.

==== 2012–2013: Final years under De Biasi ====
By this stage a senior member of the squad, Bogdani remained part of the national team following the appointment of manager Gianni De Biasi. He scored his first goal under De Biasi on 22 May 2012, netting his 16th international goal with a penalty in a 2–1 friendly win over Qatar at Campo de Fútbol de Vallecas.

For the 2014 FIFA World Cup qualifiers, De Biasi introduced several younger forwards into the squad, including Edgar Çani, Armando Sadiku and Bekim Balaj, alongside more experienced players such as Bogdani and Hamdi Salihi. Bogdani appeared as a substitute in the opening Group E match against Cyprus, coming on in the 72nd minute for Emiljano Vila and scoring in the 87th minute to secure a 3–1 victory, a goal which many considered to be the best international goal of his career. This marked his 69th appearance for Albania, making him the fifth-most capped player at the time, overtaking Igli Tare and Alban Bushi. He started the following match against Switzerland but was substituted in the 55th minute as Albania lost 2–0.

Bogdani began 2013 by scoring his 18th international goal, a first-half header, in a friendly defeat to Georgia on 6 February. He later featured as a late substitute in the qualifying match against Norway, which Albania won 1–0 for their first victory against that opponent. This proved to be his final competitive appearance. Four days later, Bogdani captained Albania for the first time in his career in a friendly match against Lithuania, earning his 74th cap before being substituted after 70 minutes.

==== Retirement and records ====
On 11 February 2014, Bogdani confirmed his retirement from professional football, ending a 17-year international career. At the time of his final international appearance in 2013, he had earned 75 caps for Albania, which ranked him third on the country’s all-time appearances list, whete the top ten at that time largely consisted of players from the same generation of 1990s, 2000s and 2010s with whom Bogdani had shared much of his international career. Bogdani remains Albania’s all-time leading goalscorer with 18 goals. He also holds several national team unique records, including the longest international career length (16 years, 11 months and 2 days; 24 April 1996 – 26 March 2013), the most goals scored for Albania in FIFA World Cup qualification matches (8), goals scored across the most decades (three: 1990s, 2000s and 2010s), and the most goals scored as a substitute (4), oldest player to score a goal for Albania, at the age of 35 years, 10 months and 23 days.

== Post-playing career ==
=== Albania national teams ===
After retirement, Bogdani started working as a youth players' scout for the Albania national football team, named on 12 August 2014 by FSHF.

On 29 August 2015, he was appointed assistant coach of the senior national team under head coach Gianni De Biasi, replacing Altin Lala.

Following the appointment of fellow assistant manager Paolo Tramezzani as technical director of the national teams, Bogdani was named manager of the Albania national under-19 football team on 9 December 2016.

=== Italy ===
In August 2022, Bogdani returned to Italy as head of scouting for the youth sector of Palermo, working under his former teammate Leandro Rinaudo. He remained in this position for two years, leaving the club at the end of the 2023–24 season.

On 30 October 2025, Bogdani was appointed assistant sporting director at Mantova 1911, a Serie B club led by Leandro Rinaudo, marking his first executive role in Italian football.

== Personal life ==
He was a cousin of Gerti Bogdani (7 July 1980 – 18 September 2024), an Albanian politician and former member of the Parliament of Albania who served as a deputy of the Democratic Party of Albania.

In June 2010, Bogdani married Italian model and jurist Rossella Ariodante. The couple met while he was playing for Salernitana. Their first child, Alexander (Aleksandër), was born in Italy on 23 June 2011. In October 2025, Alexander received his first call-up to the Italy national under-15 team. Alexander is part of the youth academy of Palermo FC, where he is considered one of the most promising talents of his generation.

Following Albania's historic participation at UEFA Euro 2016, Bogdani was among the members of the national team who were issued diplomatic passports by the Albanian government in recognition of their achievement.

== Career statistics ==
=== Club ===
Appearances and goals by club, season and competition
Club	Season	League			Cup		Continental		Total	
Club	Season	Division	Apps	Goals	Apps	Goals	Apps	Goals	Apps	Goals
Partizani Tirana	1993–94	Albanian Superliga	7	0	—		—		7	0
Partizani Tirana	1994–95	Albanian Superliga	13	2	—		—		13	2
Partizani Tirana	1995–96	Albanian Superliga	20	2	—		1 (Note: Appearance(s) in UEFA Cup)	0	21	2
Partizani Tirana	1996–97	Albanian Superliga	14	4	1	0	—		15	4
Partizani Tirana	1997–98	Albanian Superliga	15	13	—		—		15	13
Partizani Tirana	Total		69	21	1	0	1	0	71	21
Gençlerbirliği	1998–99	Süper Lig	11	1	—		—		11	1
Zagreb	1998–99	Prva HNL	14	6	—		—		14	6
Zagreb	1999–00	Prva HNL	12	2	2	3	—		14	5
Zagreb	Total		26	8	2	3	—		28	11
Reggina	1999–2000	Serie A	10	2	—		—		10	2
Reggina	2000–01	Serie A	19	1	2	0	—		21	1
Reggina	2001–02	Serie B	30	7	2	0	—		32	7
Reggina	2002–03	Serie A	11	1	5	0	—		16	1
Reggina	Total		70	11	9	0	—		79	11
Salernitana (loan)	2003–04	Serie B	38	8	—		—		38	8
Hellas Verona	2004–05	Serie B	38	17	1	0	—		39	17
Siena	2005–06	Serie A	34	11	—		—		34	11
Siena	2006–07	Serie A	15	2	2	2	—		17	4
Siena	Total		49	13	2	2	—		51	15
Chievo Verona	2006–07	Serie A	19	5	1	0	—		20	5
Chievo Verona	2007–08	Serie B	—		1	0	—		1	0
Chievo Verona	Total		19	5	2	0	—		21	5
Livorno (loan)	2007–08	Serie B	28	2	—		—		28	2
Chievo Verona	2008–09	Serie A	21	1	1	0	—		22	1
Chievo Verona	2009–10	Serie A	21	2	2	1	—		23	3
Chievo Verona	Total		42	3	3	1	—		45	4
Cesena	2010–11	Serie A	35	8	—		—		35	8
Cesena	2011–12	Serie A	14	0	3	2	—		17	2
Cesena	Total		49	8	3	2	—		52	10
Siena	2011–12	Serie A	11	4	2	0	—		13	4
Siena	2012–13	Serie A	18	2	2	0	—		20	2
Siena	Total		29	6	4	0	—		33	6
Career total			468	103	27	8	1	0	496	111

=== International ===
Appearances and goals by national team and year
National team	Year	Apps	Goals
Albania	1996	1	0
Albania	1997	0	0
Albania	1998	2	0
Albania	1999	7	1
Albania	2000	3	2
Albania	2001	3	0
Albania	2002	2	0
Albania	2003	1	0
Albania	2004	0	0
Albania	2005	9	4
Albania	2006	6	0
Albania	2007	10	1
Albania	2008	4	1
Albania	2009	5	3
Albania	2010	6	0
Albania	2011	8	3
Albania	2012	5	2
Albania	2013	3	1
Total		75	18

Scores and results list Albania's goal tally first, score column indicates score after each Bogdani goal.

List of international goals scored by Erjon Bogdani
No.	Date	Venue	Opponent	Score	Result	Competition
1	10 February 1999	Qemal Stafa Stadium, Tirana, Albania	North Macedonia	2–0	2–0	Friendly
2	15 November 2000	Qemal Stafa Stadium, Tirana, Albania	Malta	2–0	3–0	Friendly
3	15 November 2000	Qemal Stafa Stadium, Tirana, Albania	Malta	3–0	3–0	Friendly
4	8 June 2005	Parken Stadium, Copenhagen, Denmark	Denmark	1–3	1–3	2006 FIFA World Cup qualification
5	3 September 2005	Qemal Stafa Stadium, Tirana, Albania	Kazakhstan	2–0	2–1	2006 FIFA World Cup qualification
6	8 October 2005	Meteor Stadium, Dnipropetrovsk, Ukraine	Ukraine	1–1	2–2	2006 FIFA World Cup qualification
7	8 October 2005	Meteor Stadium, Dnipropetrovsk, Ukraine	Ukraine	2–1	2–2	2006 FIFA World Cup qualification
8	17 November 2007	Qemal Stafa Stadium, Tirana, Albania	Belarus	1–1	2–4	UEFA Euro 2008 qualifying
9	10 September 2008	Qemal Stafa Stadium, Tirana, Albania	Malta	1–0	3–0	2010 FIFA World Cup qualification
10	6 June 2009	Qemal Stafa Stadium, Tirana, Albania	Portugal	1–1	1–2	2010 FIFA World Cup qualification
11	12 August 2009	Qemal Stafa Stadium, Tirana, Albania	Cyprus	3–1	6–1	Friendly
12	9 September 2009	Qemal Stafa Stadium, Tirana, Albania	Denmark	1–1	1–1	2010 FIFA World Cup qualification
13	10 August 2011	Qemal Stafa Stadium, Tirana, Albania	Montenegro	1–0	3–2	Friendly
14	2 September 2011	Qemal Stafa Stadium, Tirana, Albania	France	1–2	1–2	UEFA Euro 2012 qualifying
15	6 September 2011	Stade Josy Barthel, Luxembourg City, Luxembourg	Luxembourg	1–1	1–2	UEFA Euro 2012 qualifying
16	22 May 2012	Campo de Fútbol de Vallecas, Madrid, Spain	Qatar	2–0	2–1	Friendly
17	7 September 2012	Qemal Stafa Stadium, Tirana, Albania	Cyprus	3–1	3–1	2014 FIFA World Cup qualification
18	6 February 2013	Qemal Stafa Stadium, Tirana, Albania	Georgia	1–0	1–2	Friendly

== Honors ==
Partizani Tirana

- Albanian Cup: 1996–97

Reggina

- Serie A Promotion: 2001–02

Individual

- Serie A Man of the Match with Cesena (6)
- Serie A Team of the Week with Cesena: 2010
- Albanian Footballer of the Year: 2005
- Albanian Fan's Footballer of the Year: 2002, 2005, 2007
