= MEMA =

MEMA or mema or variation, may refer to:

== Places ==
- Méma, Mali, Africa

== People ==
- Ali Mema (born 1943), Albanian soccer player
- Ardian Mema (born 1971), Albanian soccer player
- Devis Mema (born 1985), Albanian soccer player
- Marin Mema (born 1981), Albanian journalist and former football player
- Osman Mema (1939–2023), Albanian football player
- Sulejman Mema (born 1955), Albanian soccer player
- Mema, an Albanian soccer family, see List of professional sports families

=== Fictional characters ===
- Me'ma, a character from the 2012 novel Me’ma and the Great Mountain
- Mema Chaid, a character from the Colombian telenovela La luz de mis ojos

== Organizations ==
- Maryland Emergency Management Agency
- Massachusetts Emergency Management Agency
- Motor & Equipment Manufacturers Association

== Other uses ==
- Mary E. Moss Academy, a school in Maryland, USA
- a term for a Grandmother
