= Hamdi Bakalli =

Albanian footballer

Personal information
- Full name: Hamdi Bakalli
- Date of birth: 1 January 1923
- Place of birth: Shkodër, Albania
- Date of death: 1 January 1991 (aged 68)
- Place of death: Shkodër, Albania
- Position: Striker

Senior career*
Years	Team	Apps	(Gls)
1939–1944	Vllaznia		
1945	Ylli I Kuq Shkodër		
1945–1947	Vllaznia		
1947–1949	Partizani		
1950	Vllaznia		
1950–1955	Dinamo Tirana		
1955–1960	Vllaznia		

International career
1950–1953	Albania	4	(0)
- * Club domestic league appearances and goals

Hamdi Bakalli (1 January 1923 – 1 January 1991) was an Albanian footballer who played for Vllaznia Shkodër, Ylli I Kuq Shkodër, Partizani Tirana and Dinamo Tirana. He was born on 1 January 1923 in Shkodër and died on the same date of 1991, day of his 68th birthday, in the same city. He was also a member of the Albania national team between 1950 and 1953.

== Club career ==
A native of Shkodër, Bakalli played for hometown club Vllaznia but also had successful spells at capital clubs Partizani and Dinamo Tirana with whom he won a total of 7 league titles. On 20 March 1947, he scored the first ever goal of the KF Tirana–Partizani Tirana rivalry.

== International career ==
He made his debut for Albania in a September 1950 friendly match against Czechoslovakia and earned a total of 4 caps, scoring no goals. His final international was a November 1953 friendly match against Poland.

== Personal life ==
He was part of a footballing family, as all of his four brothers, Xhabir, Alush, Xhevat and Rifat were also footballers during the 1940s, 1950s and 1960s in Albania.

== Honours ==
- Albanian Superliga: 7

1947, 1948, 1950, 1951, 1952, 1953, 1955
