= Xhavit Demneri =

Albanian footballer

Personal information
- Full name: Xhavit Shyqyri Demneri
- Date of birth: 1 January 1919
- Place of birth: Tirana, Principality of Albania
- Date of death: 10 November 1996 (aged 77)
- Position: Defender

Senior career*
| Years | Team | Apps | (Gls) |
- Sport Club Rinia
- Sport Club Tirana
- Shprefeja
| 1945–1947 | Partizani | | |

International career
| 1946 | Albania | 1 | (0) |

Managerial career
- 1952: 17 Nëntori Tirana
- * Club domestic league appearances and goals

Xhavit Shyqyri Demneri (1919 — 10 November 1996) was an Albanian football player.

Xhavit Shyqyri Demneri Street, a street in Tirana, the capital of Albania, is named in his honor.

== Playing career ==
=== Club ===
He was born in Tirana, and was heavily involved in Albanian football by the late 1930s. He was active with Sport Club Rinia, Sport Club Tirana and Shprefeja. He played defense.

He was among the first to gather with Besim Fagu and Jani Leka to start the establishment of Partizani sports club at the end of 1945, also serving as coach of the football team. He was forced to retire as a player due to a knee injury. Demneri was also a member of the 1947 Partizani championship team.

=== International ===
He made his debut for Albania in an October 1946 Balkan Cup match against Yugoslavia, his sole cap.

== Managerial career ==
He is best remembered as a coach and trainer.

== Honours ==
- Albanian Superliga: 1

1947
