= Iljaz Çeço =

Albanian footballer and club director

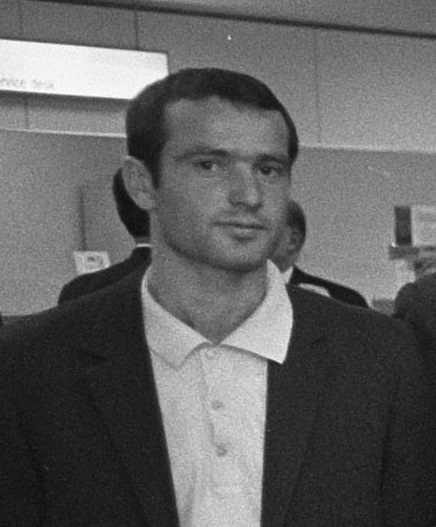
- Çeço in 1970

Personal information
- Full name: Iljaz Çeço
- Date of birth: 3 January 1947 (age 79)
- Place of birth: Lushnjë, Albania
- Position: Midfielder

Senior career*
Years	Team	Apps	(Gls)
1962–1963	Traktori		
1963–1970	Dinamo Tirana		
1970–1971	17 Nëntori		
1971–1978	Dinamo Tirana		

International career^{‡}
1969–1971	Albania U-23	12	(5)
1964–1971	Albania	8	(0)
- * Club domestic league appearances and goals ‡ National team caps and goals as of 29 March 2013

Iljaz Çeço (born 3 January 1947) is an Albanian retired football player and club director.

== Club career ==
The midfielder made his senior debut for Traktori Lushnja on 13 January 1962 against Korabi, aged only 15 and spent the rest of his playing career at Dinamo Tirana, except for one season at 17 Nëntori Tirana.

== International career ==
Çeço is the youngest footballer to ever play for Albania's national team. At only 17, he was launched by Zyber Konçi in a friendly against Algeria on October 11, 1964, that finished in a 1–1 draw. He earned a total of 8 caps, scoring no goals. His final international was a November 1971 European Championship qualification match against Turkey.

== Honours ==
- Albanian Superliga: 5

1967, 1973, 1975, 1976, 1977

- Albanian Cup: 3

1971, 1974, 1978

== Personal life ==
Çeço is married and has two children. He was a lawyer by profession. He also was chairman of Dinamo from 1981 to 1987.
