= Andi Janjeva =

Kosovan footballer (born 2002)

Personal information
- Full name: Andi Janjeva
- Date of birth: 11 October 2002 (age 24)
- Place of birth: London, England
- Height: 1.90 m (6 ft 3 in)
- Positions: Centre-back; right-back

Team information
- Current team: Partizani Tirana
- Number: 4

Youth career
- 2007–2010: Eagles United
- 2010–2022: Watford
- 2023–2024: Partizani Tirana

Senior career*
| Years | Team | Apps | (Gls) |
| 2023 | Dover Athletic | 7 | (0) |
| 2023– | Partizani Tirana | 53 | (2) |

International career^{‡}
| 2017–2018 | Kosovo U16 | 7 | (0) |
- * Club domestic league appearances and goals as of 5 September 2026 ‡ National team caps and goals as of 8 April 2018

Andi Janjeva (born 11 October 2002) is a professional footballer who plays as a centre-back or right-back for Albanian Kategoria Superiore club Partizani Tirana. Born in England, he represents Kosovo at youth level.

== Club career ==
=== Early career ===
Janjeva began his career at the age of five at Eagles United, a club established by the Albanian community in London, before later joining the Watford youth team. On 23 January 2020, he was named as a Watford first team substitute for the first time in a 2019–20 FA Cup third round proper match against Tranmere Rovers.

In March 2023, Janjeva joined National League South side Dover Athletic. On 7 March 2023, he was named as a Dover Athletic substitute for the first time in a league match against Cheshunt. His debut with Dover Athletic came eighteen days later against St Albans City after coming on as a substitute at 46th minute in place of Jake Goodman.

=== Partizani Tirana ===
In July 2023, Janjeva joined Kategoria Superiore U-21 side Partizani Tirana U-21. His debut with Partizani Tirana U-21 came on 25 October against Tirana U-21 after being named in the starting line-up.

On 1 November 2023, Janjeva was named as a Partizani Tirana's first team substitute for the first time in a Kategoria Superiore match against Laçi. His debut with Partizani Tirana's first team came on 27 November against Dinamo City after being named in the starting line-up.

== International career ==
On 19 November 2017, Janjeva was named as part of the Kosovo U16 squad for 2017 Aegean Mercedes Cup. His debut with Kosovo U16 came a day later against the host Turkey U16 after being named in the starting line-up.

On 1 August 2019, Janjeva received a call-up from Kosovo U19 for a three-day training camp in Pristina that was being held as part of preparations for the UEFA Euro 2020 qualifications.

On 15 March 2022, Janjeva received a call-up from Kosovo U21 for the UEFA Euro 2023 qualification matches against Slovenia U21, but he was an unused substitute in these matches.

== Personal life ==
Janjeva was born in London, England to Kosovo Albanian parents from Pristina.

== Honours ==
Partizani Tirana

- Albanian Supercup: 2023
