= Sllave Llambi =

Albanian footballer (1919–1985)

Personal information
- Date of birth: 26 June 1919
- Place of birth: Tirana, Principality of Albania
- Date of death: 31 December 1985 (aged 66)
- Position: Midfielder

Senior career*
Years	Team	Apps	(Gls)
1937	Tirana		
1939–1940	Brindisi	0	(0)
1940–1941	Bologna	0	(0)
1941–1942	Inter Milan	0	(0)
1942–1943	Fanfulla Lodi	27	(0)
1945–1947	Tirana		
1947–1950	Partizani		

International career
1946–1950	Albania	19	(0)

Managerial career
- 1946–1949: Partizani
- 1949: Albania
- * Club domestic league appearances and goals

Sllave Llambi (26 June 1919 – 31 December 1985) was an Albanian football player and coach. He was coach of Albania for a time.

== Club career ==
A midfielder, Llambi is considered to be the first Albanian to have won a Scudetto in Italy's Serie A (with Bologna F.C. in the 1940–41 season), although he never played a match during that year.

== International career ==
Llambi made his debut for Albania in an August 1946 friendly match against Montenegro and earned a total of 19 caps, scoring no goals. His final international was an October 1950 friendly match against Romania.

== Honours ==
Partizani Tirana

- Kategoria Superiore: 1947, 1948, 1949
