= Osman Mema =

Albanian footballer (1939–2023)

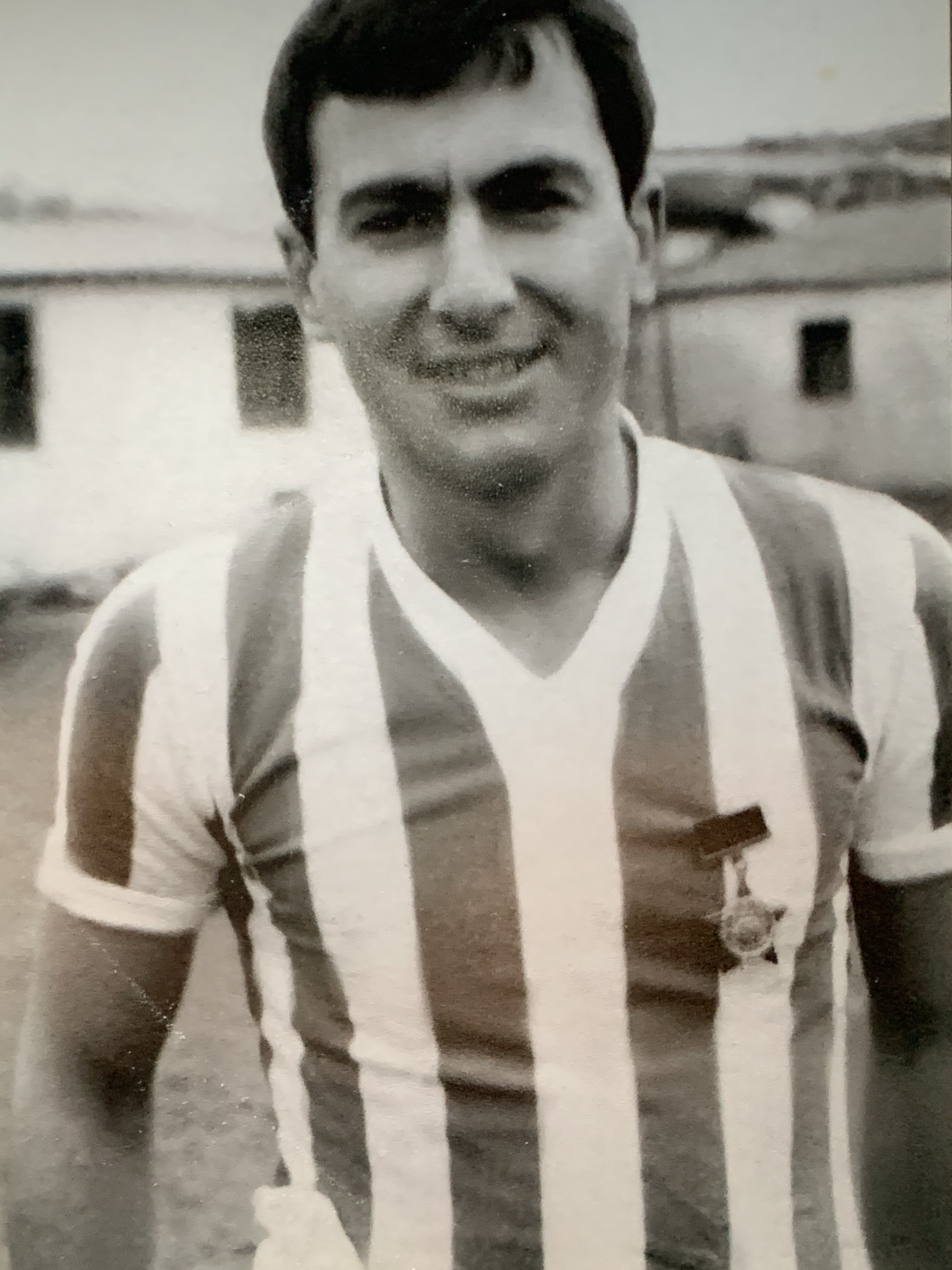

Personal information
- Full name: Osman Mustafa Mema
- Date of birth: 2 July 1939
- Place of birth: Tirana, Albania
- Date of death: 25 September 2023 (aged 84)
- Position: Defensive midfielder

Youth career
- 1956–1958: 17 Nëntori Tirana

Senior career*
Years	Team	Apps	(Gls)
1958	17 Nëntori		
1958–1965	Partizani		
1965–1971	17 Nëntori		
- * Club domestic league appearances and goals

Osman Mema (2 July 1939 – 25 September 2023) was an Albanian professional footballer who played as a midfielder. He is one of the most decorated players in the history of Albanian football, having won the Albanian National Championship seven times.

== Club career ==
Mema, like the rest of his siblings, was a product of 17 Nëntori Academy, earning his promotion in 1958 after winning two consecutive championships. Soon after that, he was called for the military service and joined the country's army team Partizani. Mema enjoyed great success there, playing with footballers such as Refik Resmja and Panajot Pano, winning the championship three times and the Republic Cup twice.

In 1965, at his father's request, Mema, who at that time was Partizani's most paid player, made a sensational return to 17 Nëntori winning four championships, where he stayed until 1971, the year in which he decided to end his career. He was able to play with his brother Ali in his second spell, helping the club to win three more league titles.

== Style of play ==
In his prime, Mema was noted for his acceleration, speed, stamina and work rate. He played as a defensive midfielder, but nevertheless he also tended to make runs forward, which also made him an attacking threat.

== Personal life ==
Osman was part of the Mema dynasty, a family which has produced several footballers. His brothers Haxhi and Ali were both footballers, as well as his nephew and Haxhi's son Sulejman, and Ali's son Ardian, who was also a footballer who played mostly for Tirana and is currently its coach.

Osman Mema died on 25 September 2023, at the age of 84.
