= Redon Ismaili =

Kosovan footballer

Personal information
- Date of birth: 23 October 2002 (age 24)
- Place of birth: Gjilan, Kosovo under UN administration
- Height: 1.81 m (5 ft 11 in)
- Position: Midfielder

Team information
- Current team: Partizani Tirana
- Number: 8

Youth career
- 2011–2018: Shkëndija Gjilan
- 2018–2022: Gjilani

Senior career*
Years	Team	Apps	(Gls)
2022–2024	Gjilani	35	(1)
2022–2023	→ Vllaznia Pozheran (loan)		
2024–	Partizani Tirana	72	(1)

International career^{‡}
2021	Kosovo U19	1	(0)
2023–2024	Kosovo U21	4	(0)
- * Club domestic league appearances and goals as of 13 May 2026 ‡ National team caps and goals as of 15 October 2024

Redon Ismaili (born 23 October 2002) is a Kosovan professional footballer who plays as a midfielder for Kategoria Superiore club Partizani Tirana.

== Club career ==
=== Early career ===
Ismaili was born in Gjilan to Kosovo Albanian parents from the village of Prilepnica. He took his first steps as a footballer at the age of 9 with the local team Shkëndija Gjilan, where, after seven years, he was transferred to the youth team of the Kosovo Superleague club Gjilani.

On 16 December 2020, Ismaili signed his first professional contract with Gjilani's senior team who competed in the Kosovo Superleague after agreeing to a five-year deal, but he still continued to be part of the under-19 team. On 5 February 2022, Ismaili was named as a Gjilani substitute for the first time in the 2021–22 Kosovar Cup round of 16 match against Dukagjini. His debut with Gjilani came a month later against Ulpiana after coming on as a substitute at 88th minute in place of Blerim Krasniqi.

In the first six months of the 2022–23 season, Ismaili was loaned to Kosovo First League side Vllaznia Pozheran.

=== Partizani Tirana ===
On 7 January 2024, Ismaili signed a three-and-a-half-year contract with Kategoria Superiore club Partizani Tirana. His debut with Partizani Tirana came six days later against Teuta after coming on as a substitute at 76th minute in place of Maguette Gueye.

== International career ==
=== Under-19 ===
On 20 January 2020, Ismaili received a call-up from Kosovo U19 for a three-day training camp in Pristina. On 16 February 2020, he was named as part of the Kosovo U19 squad for 2020 Roma Caput Mundi. His debut with Kosovo U19 came five days later in the 2020 Roma Caput Mundi match against Moldova after being named in the starting line-up.

=== Under-21 ===
On 2 September 2023, Ismaili received a call-up from Kosovo U21 for the UEFA Euro 2025 qualification matches against Poland and Germany. His debut with Kosovo U21 came on 21 November in the UEFA Euro 2025 qualification match against Israel after being named in the starting line-up.

== Honours ==
Kosovo U19

- Roma Caput Mundi: 2020
