= Sports mastery school Loro Boriçi =

Sports high school for young football players

School logo

The Sports mastery school Loro Boriçi is a sports high school that specializes in cultivating young football players. It is located in Tirana, Albania. Recently the Albanian government, in collaboration with the Albanian Football Association, has taken a decision to transform it into a National Academy of Football.

In the 2010-2011 academic year the school had 120 students and 30 teachers, and according to its principal, former notable player Sulejman Mema, is expected to have more in the future, given the endorsement of the Albanian government.

== Notable alumni ==
- Agustin Kola
- Sulejman Mema
- Rudi Vata
- Altin Rraklli
