= 1970 Balkans Cup =

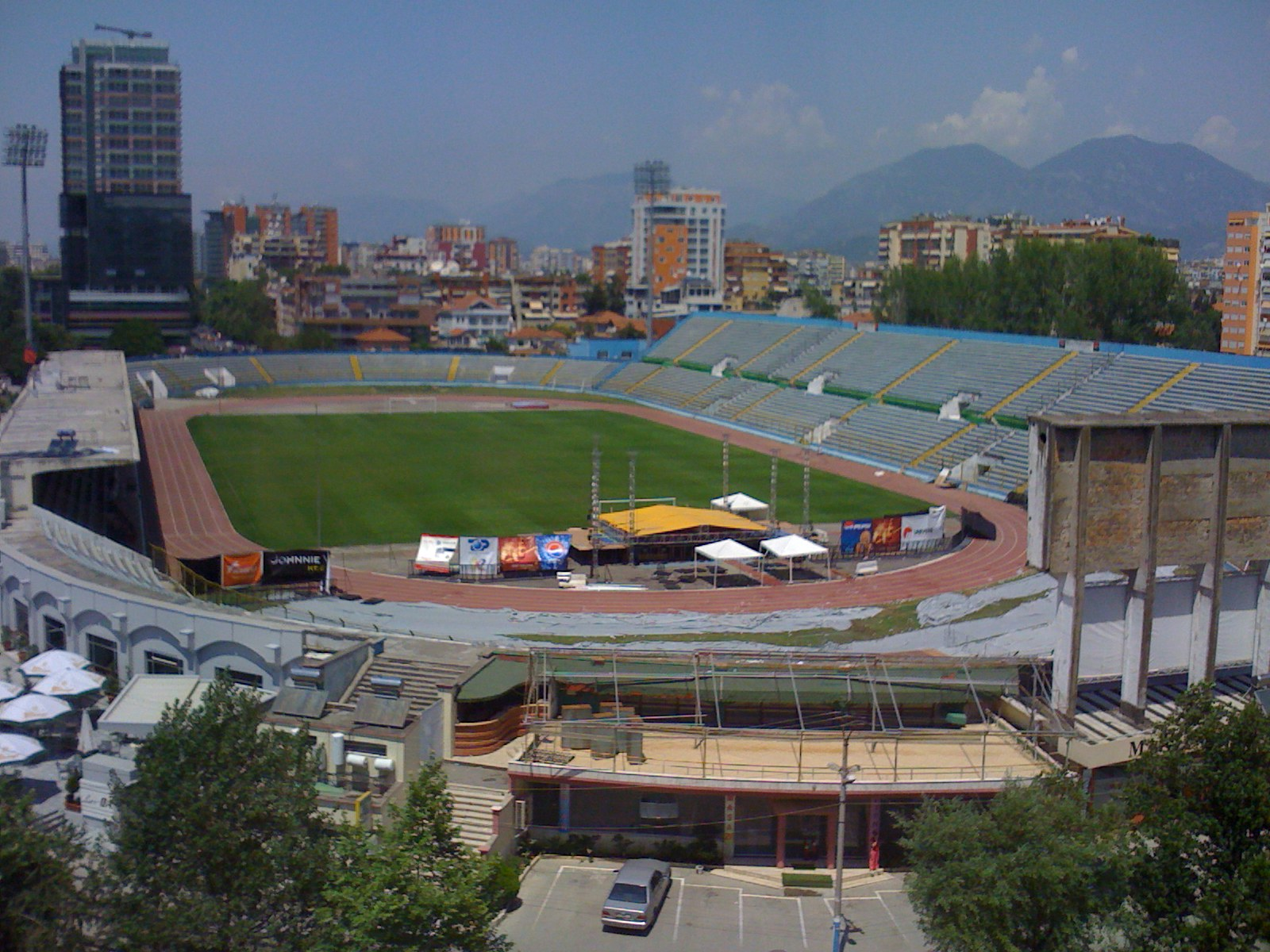
- Qemal Stafe Stadium in Tirana, Albania

Tournament details
- Country: Balkans
- Teams: 6

Final positions
- Champions: (Albania) Partizani Tirana
- Runners-up: (Bulgaria) Beroe Stara Zagora

Tournament statistics
- Matches played: 14
- Goals scored: 37 (2.64 per match)

The 1970 Balkans Cup was an edition of the Balkans Cup, a football competition for representative clubs from the Balkan states. It was contested by 6 teams and Partizani Tirana won the trophy.

== Group Stage ==
=== Group A ===
Pos	Team	Pld	W	D	L	GF	GA	GR	Pts	Qualification
1	(Bulgaria) Beroe Stara Zagora (A)	4	3	0	1	8	5	1.600	6	Advances to finals
2	(Turkey) Eskişehirspor	4	2	0	2	6	5	1.200	4	
3	(Greece) Egaleo	4	1	0	3	5	9	0.556	2	

Source: rsssf.com
Rules for classification: 1) points; 2) goal average; 3) number of goals scored
(A) Advance to a further round
11 March 1970

Egaleo (Greece)	0–2	(Bulgaria) Beroe Stara Zagora

Stavros Mavrothalassitis, Athens

20 May 1970

Beroe Stara Zagora (Bulgaria)	4–2	(Greece) Egaleo

Beroe, Stara Zagora

3 June 1970

Egaleo (Greece)	3–0	(Turkey) Eskişehirspor
Giannakopoulos 14'; Chrysostomou 54'; Lykourinos 82'

Stavros Mavrothalassitis, Athens

7 June 1970

Beroe Stara Zagora (Bulgaria)	1–0	(Turkey) Eskişehirspor

Beroe, Stara Zagora

14 June 1970

Eskişehirspor (Turkey)	3–1	(Bulgaria) Beroe Stara Zagora
Heper 20', 42'; Konca 34'		Dimitri 44'

Eskişehir Atatürk, Eskişehir

30 August 1970

Eskişehirspor (Turkey)	3–0	(Greece) Egaleo
Şenoğlu 69'; Heper 87'

Eskişehir Atatürk, Eskişehir

=== Group B ===
Pos	Team	Pld	W	D	L	GF	GA	GR	Pts	Qualification
1	(Albania) Partizani Tirana (A)	4	2	1	1	4	3	1.333	5	Advances to finals
2	(Socialist Federal Republic of Yugoslavia) Sloboda Tuzla	4	1	3	0	6	5	1.200	5	
3	(Romania) Universitatea Craiova	4	0	2	2	3	5	0.600	2	

Source: rsssf.com
Rules for classification: 1) points; 2) goal average; 3) number of goals scored
(A) Advance to a further round
15 April 1970

Sloboda Tuzla (Socialist Federal Republic of Yugoslavia)	1–1	(Albania) Partizani Tirana
Goal		Pano

Tušanj, Tuzla

6 May 1970

Partizani Tirana (Albania)	1–0	(Romania) Universitatea Craiova
Janku

Dinamo, Tirana

27 May 1970

Universitatea Craiova (Romania)	0–1	(Albania) Partizani Tirana
		Janku 37'

Central, Craiova
Attendance: 20,000
Referee: Nejat Şener (Turkey)

10 June 1970

Sloboda Tuzla (Socialist Federal Republic of Yugoslavia)	2–2	(Romania) Universitatea Craiova

Tušanj, Tuzla

17 June 1970

Universitatea Craiova (Romania)	1–1	(Socialist Federal Republic of Yugoslavia) Sloboda Tuzla

Central, Craiova

1 July 1970

Partizani Tirana (Albania)	1–2	(Socialist Federal Republic of Yugoslavia) Sloboda Tuzla
Pano		Goal

Dinamo, Tirana

== Finals ==
Team 1	Agg.	Team 2	1st leg	2nd leg
Beroe Stara Zagora (Bulgaria)	1–4	(Albania) Partizani Tirana	1–1	0–3^{1}

=== First leg ===
9 August 1970

Beroe Stara Zagora (Bulgaria)	1–1	(Albania) Partizani Tirana
Goal		Bizi

Beroe, Stara Zagora

=== Second leg ===
16 August 1970

Partizani Tirana (Albania)	3–0 Awarded^{1}	(Bulgaria) Beroe Stara Zagora

Dinamo, Tirana

Partizani Tirana won 4–1 on aggregate.

Notes

- Note 1: Beroe Stara Zagora didn't show up for the second leg.
