= Sulejman Starova (footballer) =

Albanian footballer and coach

Personal information
- Date of birth: 12 December 1955 (age 70)
- Place of birth: Tirana, PR Albania
- Height: 1.79 m (5 ft 10 1/2 in)
- Position: Defender

Senior career*
Years	Team	Apps	(Gls)
1973–1977	Tirana		
1977–1985	Partizani		

International career
1978–1979	Albania U21	4	(0)

Managerial career
- 1990–1994: Partizani
- 1996–1997: Partizani
- 2004–2005: Tirana
- 2005–2006: Partizani
- 2006–2007: Teuta
- 2007: Tirana
- 2007–2008: Besa
- 2008–2009: Teuta
- 2010: Tirana
- 2014: Kukësi
- 2015–2016: Partizani
- 2016–2017: Partizani
- 2017–2018: Partizani
- 2018: Feronikeli
- 2019: Laçi
- * Club domestic league appearances and goals

Sulejman Starova (born 12 December 1955) is an Albanian professional football manager and former player.

== Managerial career ==
As a manager, he has been in charge of his previous club Partizani Tirana as well as KF Tirana, Besa Kavajë and Teuta Durrës. He has also been technical director of Partizani, Teuta and FK Kukësi. On 10 February 2014 he was named as the manager of FK Kukësi following the departure of Naci Şensoy.

On 5 November 2017, Partizani Tirana announced on their official website that Starova will be the replacement of the sacked Mark Iuliano, starting the training on 7th. In September 2018, Starova was fired by Kosovan side Feronikeli after 12 matches in charge.

=== Managerial statistics ===
As of 5 March 2018

Team	From	To	Record					Ref
Team	From	To	M	W	D	L	Win %	Ref
Kukësi	11 February 2014	31 May 2014	19	12	3	4	63.2	
Partizani Tirana	30 May 2015	27 December 2015	22	15	4	3	68.2	
Partizani Tirana	10 October 2016	6 July 2017	35	17	14	4	48.6	
Partizani Tirana	5 November 2017	5 March 2018	18	9	3	6	50.0	
Total			538	383	94	61	71.2	—

== Director career ==
Starova was the General Secretary of the Albanian Football Association until 2004. On 17 June 2014, he was named the new sporting director of Partizani Tirana.

== Honours ==
as a player

- Albanian Superliga: 2

1979, 1981

as a manager

- Albanian Superliga: 1

1993
