= Ilia Shuke =

Albanian footballer and coach

Managerial career
- Years: Team
- 1966-1975: Skënderbeu
- 1967-1971: Albania (assistant)
- 1973: Albania
- 1975–1977: Partizani

Ilia Shuke was a footballer and coach of the Albania national football team for a short spell in 1973, where he led the team to their first ever World Cup qualification win, a 1–0 defeat of Finland in October 1973.

== Managerial career ==
His other two matches in charge of Albania were a World Cup qualification loss against East Germany, and a friendly draw against China.

He also was an assistant to national team coach Loro Boriçi in the 1960s.
