= Neptun Bajko =

Albanian footballer and coach

Personal information
- Date of birth: 8 September 1946 (age 80)
- Place of birth: Albania

Senior career*
Years	Team	Apps	(Gls)
1967–1971	Partizani Tirana		

Managerial career
- 1986–1988: Partizani Tirana
- 1991: Dinamo Tirana
- 1994–1996: Albania
- 2001: Partizani
- 2002–2003: Partizani
- 2004–2005: Teuta
- 2005: Partizani
- 2006–2007: Partizani
- 2007–2008: Besëlidhja
- 2010–2011: Partizani
- * Club domestic league appearances and goals

Neptun Bajko (born 8 September 1948) is an Albanian former footballer and coach for Partizani Tirana and Albania.

== Playing career ==
Bajko scored for Partizani in a controversial 1968–69 European Cup Winners' Cup first round loss away against Torino, a first post-war confrontation between an Italian and Albanian club side.

== Honours ==
as a player

- Kategoria Superiore: 1

1971

as a coach

- Kategoria Superiore: 1

1987
