= FK Partizani Tirana =

Albanian football club

Partizani
- Full name: Futboll Klub Partizani
- Nickname: Demat e Kuq (Red Bulls)
- Founded: 4 February 1946; 80 years ago
- Ground: Arena e Demave
- Capacity: 3,959
- President: Gazmend Demi
- Manager: Mislav Karoglan
- League: Kategoria Superiore
- 2025–26: Kategoria Superiore, 5th
- Website: partizani.net
Home colours	Away colours	Third colours

Futboll Klub Partizani Tirana is an Albanian professional football club based in Tirana, that competes in the Kategoria Superiore. Founded in 1946, the club was historically affiliated to the Albanian army and the communist regime. Partizani's home ground is the newly built stadium at Partizani Complex. The club also uses Arena Kombëtare for matches in European competitions and major domestic football derbies in Albania.

The club first competed in an official competition in 1947 where they won the Albania National Championship, thus being crowned the champions of Albania in their debut season as well as the following two seasons. In total the club have been national champions on 17 occasions between 1947 and 2023, which is the last time the club won the Kategoria Superiore. They have won 18 other officially recognised domestic honours, including 15 Albanian Cups as well as Second Division. They are also the only Albanian club side to have won an international football competition through their 1970 Balkans Cup campaign in which they beat Bulgarian side Beroe Stara Zagora in the final.

== History ==
=== Foundation (1945–1946) ===
FK Partizani Tirana was officially founded on 4 February 1946 soon after the end of World War II and the liberation of Albania. However, one year earlier in 1945, there had been two military division teams competing in the first National Championship following the end of World War II. The teams were called Ylli Shkodër and Liria Korçë, and they were both dissolved as clubs at the end of the season, with their best players moving to Tirana to join Ushtria, which literally translates to The Army. Ushtria played their first friendly game on 13 January 1946 against the reigning champions of Albania Vllaznia Shkodër, in a game that ended in a goalless draw in Tirana that was played during heavy rainfall. The team played their first ever match in distinctive red shirts with each player's initials on their chests. The club's first ever lineup was Alfred Bonati, Luga, Tepelia, Xhavit Shyqyri Demneri, Besim Fagu, Rexhepi, Lutfi Hoxha, Qamil Teliti, Kavaja, Hamdi Bakalli and Bylyku. The following month, on 4 February, Ushtria was developed into an organised sports club which was to be named in honour of the Albanian Partisans who had fought for the liberation of the country. In the early history of the club they recruited players from the Scanderbeg Military High School and Albanian Military Academy, as well as players from other clubs who were ordered by the ruling Communists to play for Partizani.

On 7 April the club played their first official match under the name Partizani, which was against another team from the same city 17 Nëntori Tirana. Partizani won the match 2–0 through the goals of Osman Pengili and Qamil Teliti, with a lineup consisting of Çobani, Tepeli, Muhamet Dibra, Besim Fagu, Kavaja, Osman Pengili, Lutfi Hoxha, Hivzi Sakiqi, Bylyku and Xhavit Shyqyri Demneri. As the club did not participate in the 1946 National Championship, they instead took a tour of Albania playing friendly games against some of the biggest clubs in the country at the time, and ended their 9 match tour with 26 goals scored and 9 against, and Qamil Teliti scoring 11 goals to make him the tour's top goalscorer.

=== Early dominance (1947–1964) ===
With Partizani Loro Boriçi won the 1949 and 1954 titles.

Partizani first competed in a national competition in 1947, where they were enrolled into the top flight of Albanian football in their debut season and played 16 games, winning 14, drawing 1 and losing 1 as they went on to win the National Championship in their first competitive campaign. They finished on 29 points, just 1 ahead of Vllaznia Shkodër, who had won the previous 2 National Championships, and they had a goal difference of 41, after scoring 56 goals and conceding 16. The championship winning team was managed by Sllave Llambi, and was made up of Abdulla Stërmasi, Kamberi, Ramazan Njala, Besim Fagu, Medo Cuciqi, Sulejman Vathi, Xhavit Shyqyri Demneri, Hivzi Sakiqi, Isuf Pelingu, Tafil Baci, Lutfi Hoxha, Osman Pengili, Hamdi Tafmizi, Zihni Gjinali, Zef Gavoci, Eqrem Dauti, Zyber Lisi, Alush Merhori and Hamdi Bakalli, who was also the league's top goalscorer with 7 goals. The following season the Albanian Football Association decided to change the format of the championship and divided teams into two groups based on geographical location, with Group A being a northern conference and Group B being a southern conference. Partizani were placed in Group A where they finished top of the group level on points with Vllaznia Shkodër, and due to possessing a better goal difference Partizani were the group winners and reached the championship final on 25 August 1947 against Flamurtari Vlorë. The final was played in Tirana and Partizani won with an emphatic 6–2 scoreline, following goals from Vasif Biçaku, Xhevdet Shaqiri and four goals from Zihni Gjinali to give Partizani their second consecutive title. Gjinali was also the league's top goalscorer for the campaign, after finishing level on 11 goals with Flamurtari Vlorë forward Tish Daija, who also scored in the championship final. The Republic Cup also returned in 1948 and Partizani competed in the competition for the first time, and they also went on to win it following a 5–2 victory over local rivals 17 Nentori Tirana in the final which secured the first double in Albanian football. They retained the league title the following season following an undefeated campaign, and they also retained the cup as they defeated 17 Nentori Tirana 1–0 in the final.

Partizani finished the 1950 National Championship level on points with newly formed Interior Ministry team Dinamo Tirana, and despite having a superior goal difference the Albanian Football Association decided to award the title to Dinamo after using a strange mathematical calculation using goal statistics, which were 77:10 = 7.7 for Partizani and 60:6 = 10.0 for Dinamo. After losing out on the title to new local rivals Dinamo, Partizani also came runners up to them in the Republic Cup, which began a long period of football in Albania dominated by the two sides. The following season, the club finished as runners up to Dinamo in both the league and the cup, but 19 year old striker Refik Resmja managed to score 59 goals in 23 games for Partizani which gave him a 2.57 goalscoring average, a record that is considered to be the best ever in top flight football.

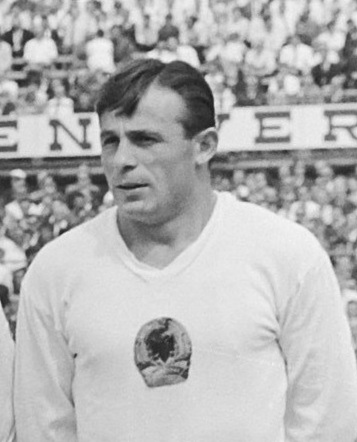
Panajot Pano is considered one of the best Footballers that played for Partizani Tirana.

Despite finishing level on points and with a greater goal difference than Dinamo during the 1952 campaign, the same strange mathematical calculation as in 1950 was used and the title was once again awarded to Dinamo. The following season they finished runners up in both the league and the cup to Dinamo, before winning the league title in 1954 which was their first trophy since 1949. The club also finished as runners up in the cup to Dinamo in the 1954 Republic Cup, before going off to compete in the third unofficial Championship of Communist Countries' Army Clubs held in Bulgaria, where they only managed to win 1 game and lose 3. They then finished as runners up again to Dinamo Tirana for the next 2 seasons, meaning Partizani won just 1 league title in the previous 7 years.

1957 marked the return of Partizani as the most dominant club in Albania, as they won the league and cup double, a feat they repeated once again in 1958 before competing in the first official Spartakiada, the Championship of Communist Countries' Army Clubs in East Germany. They defeated The Cong Hanoi of Vietnam, CCA București of Romania, Dukla Prague of Czechoslovakia and Vorwärts Berlin of East Germany to reach the final against CDNA Sofia of Bulgaria, who narrowly defeated Partizani 1–0 at the Leipzig Zentralstadion in front of 100,000 spectators. They returned to Albania with silver medals and used the experience to retain both the league and cup to complete consecutive doubles, and in 1959 they won just the league as the cup was not held that year. However, Dinamo won the double in 1960 as Partizani finished runners up in the league, but they completed the double themselves the following season and they became the first Albanian club to participate in a European competition in 1962, which occurred due to Albania's Communist leader Enver Hoxha falling out with the Soviet Union in 1960, meaning the domestic league formats were changed in line with Europe's and Albania no longer excluded themselves from competing in European competitions. Partizani faced Swedish champions IFK Norrköping in the first round of the UEFA European Cup and they lost the first leg 2–0 in Norrköping before earning a 1–1 draw in Tirana, where rocks were thrown onto the pitch at the end of the match which ended in a 3–1 aggregate loss for Partizani. During the 1962–63 campaign Partizani once again won the league title and they were then drawn against Bulgarian Spartak Plovdiv side in the European Cup, and they won their first European game in the first leg as they defeated Spartak Plovdiv 1–0 in Tirana, but they were eliminated after losing 3–1 in Plovdiv. The following season they completed the double, which would be their last of the communist era, and in December 1963, halfway through the season, Partizani competed in the third official Spartakiada, the second of which included football, held in Vietnam, and they defeated CDNA Sofia in a rematch of the previous final, as well as Budapest Honvéd of Hungary, and Vorwärts Berlin to reach the semi-finals where they defeated Budapest Honvéd once again to reach the final against a team from the Soviet Union consisting of players from CSKA Moscow and SKA Rostov-on-Don, where they lost 2–0 after extra time to finish as runners up in consecutive Spartakiads. They faced German side 1. FC Köln in the European Cup at the start of the following season, and they drew 0–0 in the first leg in Tirana, but lost 2–0 away in Cologne to lose the tie on aggregate. As Albania was a Stalinist state at the time, during the first leg the 1. FC Köln team was involved in a minor diplomatic incident arose when it was evident that the West Germans had brought their own food and a chef to cook it. 1. Köln's administrator Julius Ukrainczyk eventually negotiated a compromise that saw the food allowed in but the chef sent home.

=== Rise in opposition (1965–1993) ===
After winning their 10th league title in 17 years, Partizani struggled to maintain their dominance at the top of Albanian football, as they finished as runners up in 4 of the next 5 seasons, but they did win 3 consecutive Republic Cups between 1965 and 1970, as the cup was not held for 2 years during this period. They competed in the 1968–69 European Cup Winners' Cup where they were drawn against Italian side Torino, whom they defeated 1–0 in Tirana before losing 3–1 in Turin to lose 3–2 on aggregate. In 1970 they became the first and only Albanian club to win an international competition, as they defeated Beroe Stara Zagora to win the regional 1970 Balkans Cup, following a 1–1 draw in Tirana and a 3–0 awarded win for the second leg, as Beroe withdrew. Partizani participated in the Cup Winners' Cup in 1970, and they faced Swedish side Åtvidabergs FF in the preliminary round where the drew 1–1 in Åtvidaberg before winning 2–0 in Tirana to earn the club its first European tie victory as they moved into the last 16 where they faced Austrian side Wacker Innsbruck. Partizani lost 3–2 in the first leg in Innsbruck despite being ahead 2–1 at half time, and they lost 2–1 in the return leg at home, which was their first European home loss in 6 games. They won the 1970–71 National Championship which was their first title since 1964, and they qualified for the first round of the European Cup where they lost 4–0 on aggregate to Bulgarian side CSKA Sofia. They once again failed to retain their title and struggled the following season, finishing 4th in the league and being knocked out of the cup in the semi-finals, before going on to win the cup during the 1972–73 season as well as finishing as runners up in the league. They finished as runners up the following season in both the league and cup, before failing to reach the final of the cup or finish in the top 2 of the league until 1979 which is when they managed to win their 11th league title ahead of local rivals KF Tirana. They then faced Scottish champions Celtic in the European Cup whom they defeated 1–0 in Tirana. Once again Albania's communist regime made it difficult for foreign clubs to enter and play in Albania, and it took Celtic over 2 months to acquire visas for their players and staff and they were unable to acquire visas for press and a small number of supporters. The return leg ended in disappointment for Partizani as despite opening the scoring they lost 4–1, meaning they lost the tie 4–2 on aggregate.

Partizani once again failed to challenge for the title the following season, as they could only manage a 4th-place finish, but they won the cup after beating Labinoti Elbasan 2–1 on aggregate in the final. They qualified for the Cup Winners' Cup and faced Swedish side Malmö FF whom they narrowly lost 1–0 on aggregate following a 1–0 loss in Malmö and a goalless draw in Tirana. The club won the 1980–81 National Championship ahead of Dinamo and KF Tirana, meaning they qualified for the European Cup where they faced Austrian side Austria Wien whom they lost 3–2 on aggregate to following a disappointing 3–1 first leg away loss and a 1–0 home win. The club had to wait until 1987 for their next trophy, which came in the shape of the National Championship which they won ahead of Flamurtari Vlorë. They faced Portuguese champions Benfica in an infamous first leg in Lisbon that saw Partizani lose 4–0 and end the game with 7 men as 4 players were sent off including goalkeeper and captain Perlat Musta. Partizani were punished by UEFA for the incidents, and they were knocked out of the competition following a walkover victory for Benfica in what would have been the second leg, and they were also banned from Europe for 4 years. Partizani finished 9th in the 1987–88 campaign, which was their lowest ever finish in the league and they also missed out on the cup as they lost in the final to Flamurtari Vlorë. They somewhat bounced back the following season as they finished as runners up in the league, a feat that was repeated for 4 seasons in a row. They competed in the UEFA Cup in 1990, where they lost to Romanian side Universitatea Craiova, and they also won the cup in 1991 after beating Flamurtari in the final. In the Cup Winners' Cup the following season, they narrowly lost 1–0 to Dutch side Feyenoord, whom they held to a 0–0 draw in Tirana before losing the tie to a late goal in Rotterdam.

The 1992–93 campaign proved to be last truly successful one for the club, as they managed to win their 7th double in their history. They won the Kategoria Superiore in a season where Edmond Dosti became Partizani's first league top goalscorer since Agim Murati in 1979, and they won the Albanian Cup after defeating Albpetrol Patos in the final. After winning the double Partizani faced Icelandic side ÍA Akranes in the preliminary round of the European Cup. They earned a goalless draw in the first leg in Tirana before losing 3–0 in Akranes, where all 3 goals came in the second half. Following the fall of communism in Albania clubs struggled to support themselves financially and Partizani was also heavily reliant on the Albanian Army's support along with the communist regime. The fall of communism made it difficult for Partizani to be sustainable as a club, which in turn caused the club problems for the next 20 years.

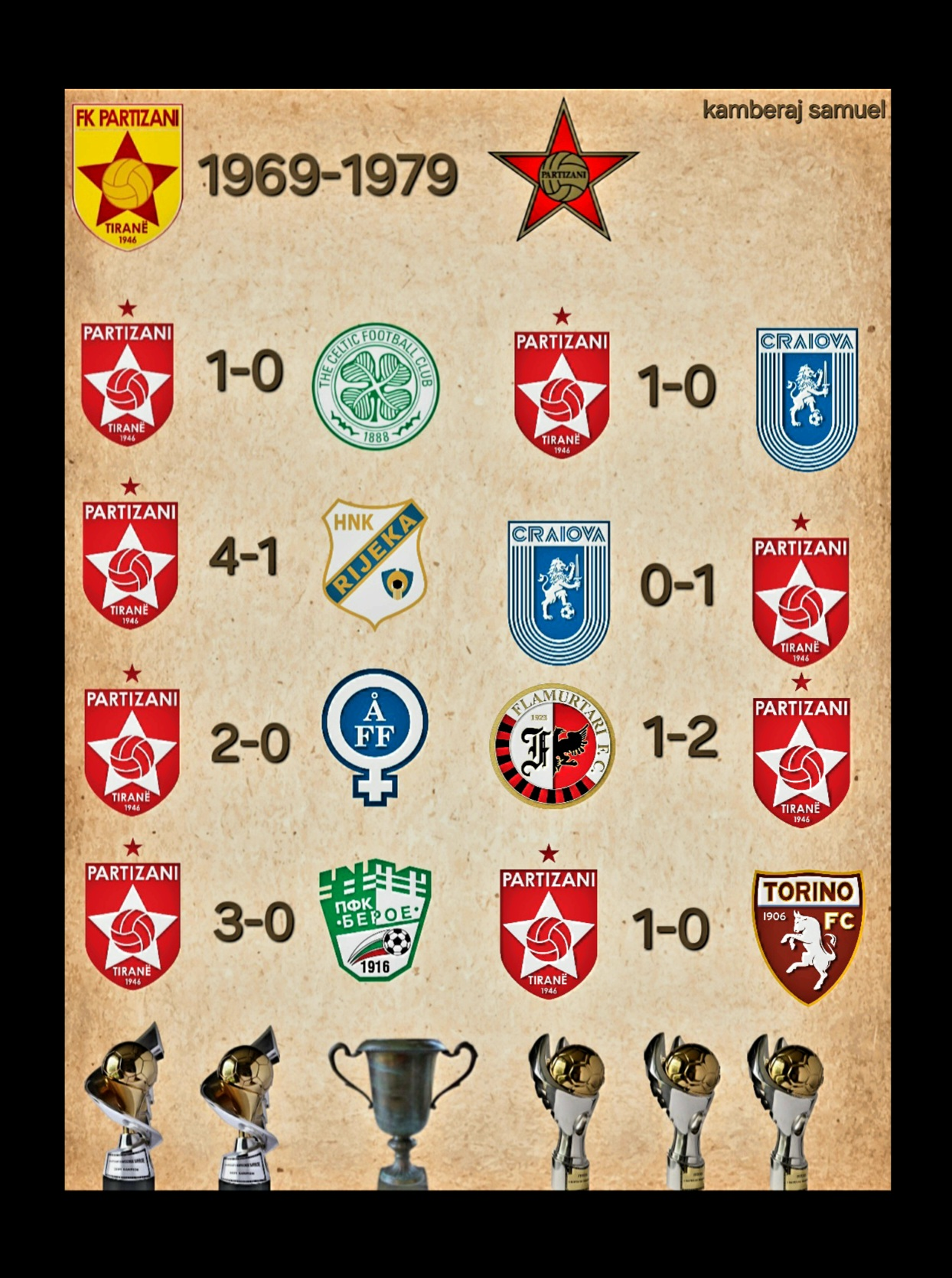

=== Post-communist era (1993–2008) ===
After winning the double in 1993 Partizani began to decline in terms of power, and the club was taken over by businessman Albert Xhani in 1994. Because Teuta Durrës had finished 2nd in the league and won the cup, Partizani were given a place in the UEFA Cup as the third-placed team, and they faced Turkish side Fenerbahçe in 1995, whom they lost 6–0 to on aggregate as they struggled against far superior opposition. Partizani continued to struggle to compete domestically with their only success coming in 1997 as they won the Albanian Cup. The club's fortunes continued to worsen and they found themselves in bottom spot in the league and the club eventually experienced relegation for the first time in its history at the end of the 1999–00 season. The spent one season in the Albanian First Division, as they won the division title and earned promotion at the first attempt. During their first season back in the top flight they managed a respectable third-place finish which qualified them for the UEFA Cup, where they were drawn against Israeli side Hapoel Tel Aviv, whom they lost 5–1 to on aggregate as they failed to progress to the next round.

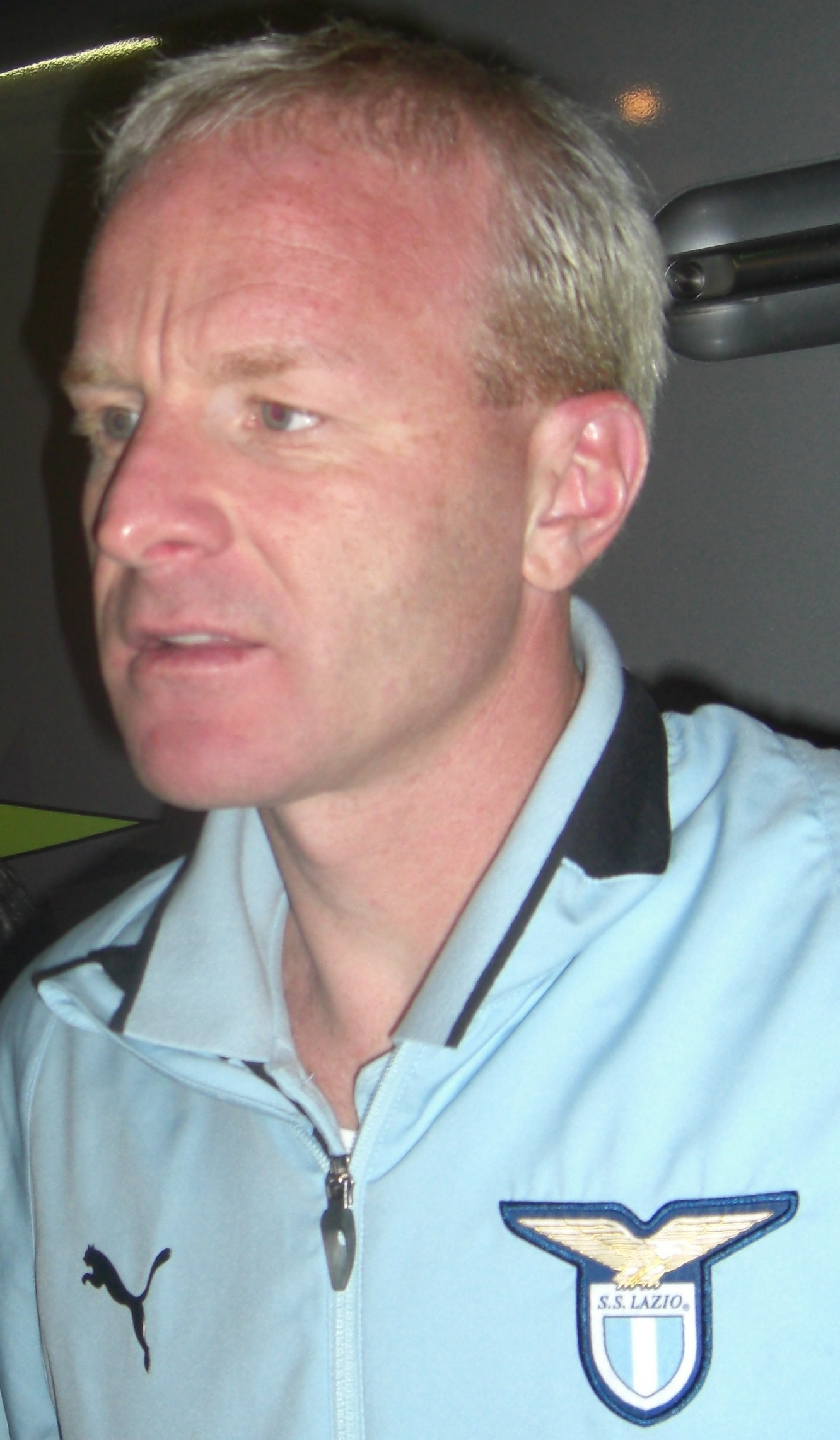
Igli Tare was one of the best players in the history of Partizani Tirana.

The following season they once again finished third and they also reached the quarter-finals of the Albanian Cup, as they qualified for the Intertoto Cup where they were once again drawn against Israeli opposition in Maccabi Netanya, to whom they lost 3–1 to in Netanya before winning the return leg in Tirana 2–0 against the odds to qualify for the next round of a European competition for only the second time. In the next round they faced Moldovan side Dacia Chișinău to whom they lost 5–0 on aggregate to, putting an end to their Intertoto Cup run. Domestically they managed a fourth-place finish, just one point behind Vllaznia Shkodër in third place, and they also won the Albanian Cup, which was the first major trophy by the club in 11 years, aside from the Albanian First Division. In the UEFA Cup the following season Partizani was drawn against Maltese side Birkirkara, whom they beat 4–2 in the first leg in Tirana, and despite losing 2–1 in the away leg they managed to qualify for the next round where they faced Israeli side Hapoel Bnei Sakhnin who defeated Partizani 6–1 on aggregate to eliminate them, following 3–0 and 3–1 away and home losses, respectively. During the 2004–05 campaign Partizani struggled in the league and they finished third from bottom, although they were not in real danger of being relegated as they finished 22 points away from the relegation zone. In the cup they narrowly lost out to eventual winners Teuta Durrës in the semi-finals, as they lost out on the away goal rule following a 2–2 aggregate draw. The following season performances improved and they finished fourth, just 2 points behind local rivals KF Tirana in second place, as they also reached the quarter-finals of the cup. They qualified for the Intertoto Cup once again, where they faced Cypriot side Ethnikos Achna who Partizani defeated 2–1 in Tirana but lost 4–2 to in Achnas to lose 5–4 on aggregate. The 2006–07 campaign saw the club finish fourth once again, and they also missed out on reaching the final of the Albanian Cup on the away goal rule after a 1–1 aggregate draw with Teuta Durrës. The following season Partizani challenged for the title with local rivals Dinamo Tirana, but they were unable to win the league and they eventually finished 5 points away from Dinamo as they finished as runners up for the 19th time.

=== Downfall and revival (2008–present) ===
After a strong season, Partizani qualified the UEFA Cup and faced Bosnian side Široki Brijeg in the first qualifying round, but they eventually lost 3–1 on aggregate which was the start to what would prove to be a very difficult season, as they struggled in the league and avoided the automatic relegation zone by a single goal on goal difference. They did however face Kastrioti Krujë in a relegation play-out that led to Partizani's relegation once again, in a game that was marred by poor refereeing decisions as well as violence. Partizani began the 2009–10 campaign in the Albanian First Division and the club's president Albert Xhani began to withdraw from backing the club financially, which meant that the majority of wages were not paid for the season and during the winter break Paro Laci and Lulëzim Sallaku bought out 40% and 10% of the club's shares, respectively, with Xhani retaining the remaining 50%. Laci took control of the majority of the club's finances, and wages were paid to the staff and the players, but despite push for promotion they were unable to reach the play off places and finished the league in 4th place. The 2010–11 season would prove to be the worst in the club's history as they experienced relegation to the Albanian Second Division, the third tier, for the first time, as they were relegated for the 2nd time in 2 years. The club finished bottom of the First Division table, with a record of 4 wins, 5 draws and 21 losses, scoring a total of just 16 goals in 30 games. During the first and only season in the Second Division, Partizani managed to finish top of Group B by a single point, which guaranteed their promotion and their qualification to the championship final against Tërbuni Pukë on 17 May 2012, which ended in a 3–1 loss for Partizani. The club's return to the First Division would prove to be a successful one as they finished as runners up behind KF Lushnja to achieve back to back promotion, in a season that saw the club change ownership as Gazment Demi bought out 50% of the club's shares in January 2013, making him and Lulëzim Sallaku co-owners and co-financiers of the club. The club achieved promotion back into the Kategoria Superiore following a four-year absence and Demi took over as president following the departure of Sallaku from the post.

After 5 seasons of winning nothing in the Kategoria Superiore, Partizani won its first title in 26 years, under coach Skënder Gega, and return to UEFA Champions League after 3 years of absence.

== Stadium ==
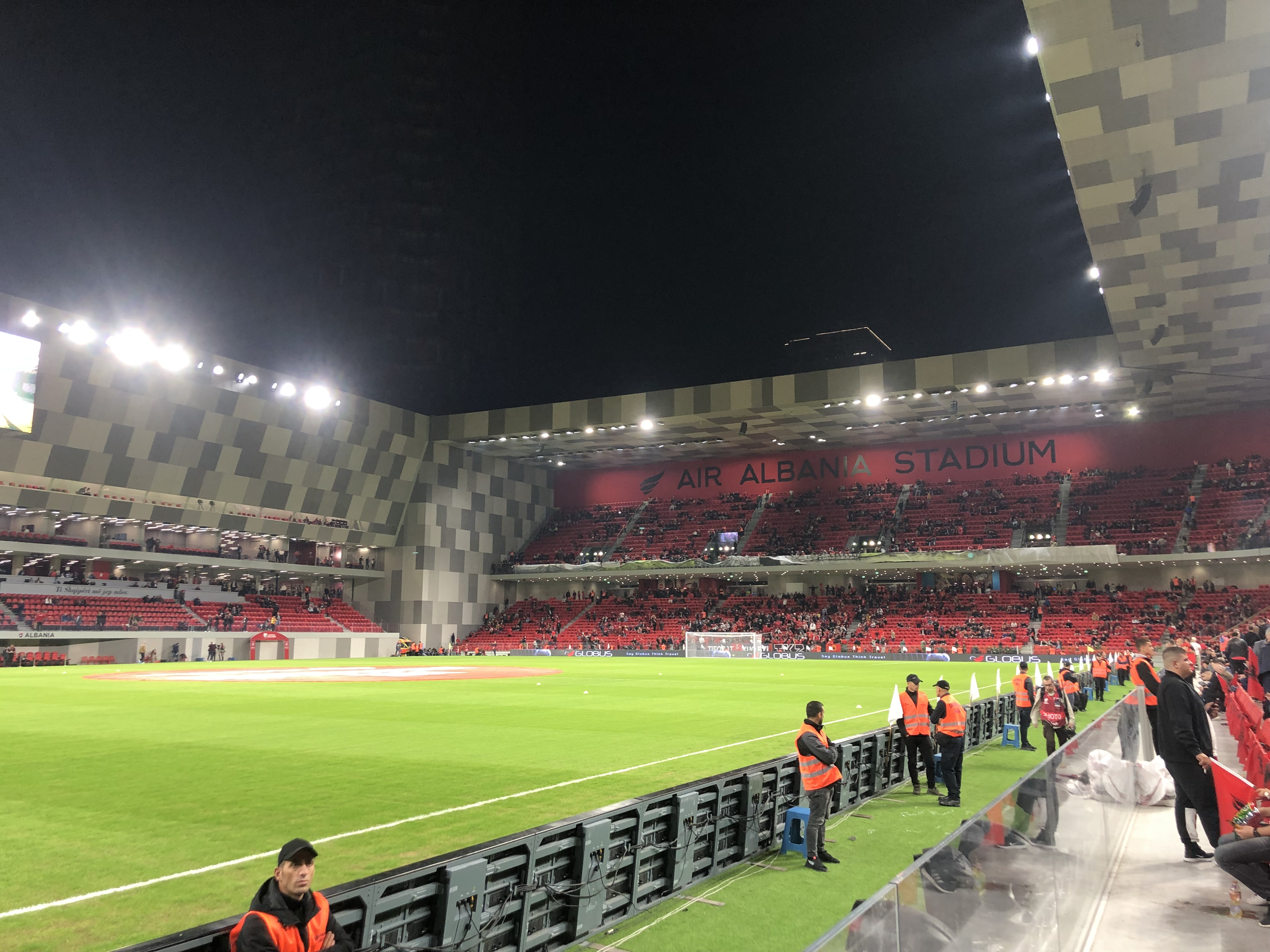
Arena Kombëtare serves as the home ground of the team

During the club's early history they played their home games at Albania's main stadium, the Qemal Stafa Stadium which was shared with local rivals KF Tirana and then also Dinamo Tirana. A second stadium was built in Tirana in 1956, which was the Selman Stërmasi Stadium, and this stadium was also shared by the three main Tirana clubs. The club stopped sharing the Selman Stërmasi Stadium in 2014 when they were promoted back to the Kategoria Superiore, and in the summer of 2016 the process of demolishing the Qemal Stafa Stadium will begin, in order to facilitate the proposed 22,500-seater Arena Kombëtare.

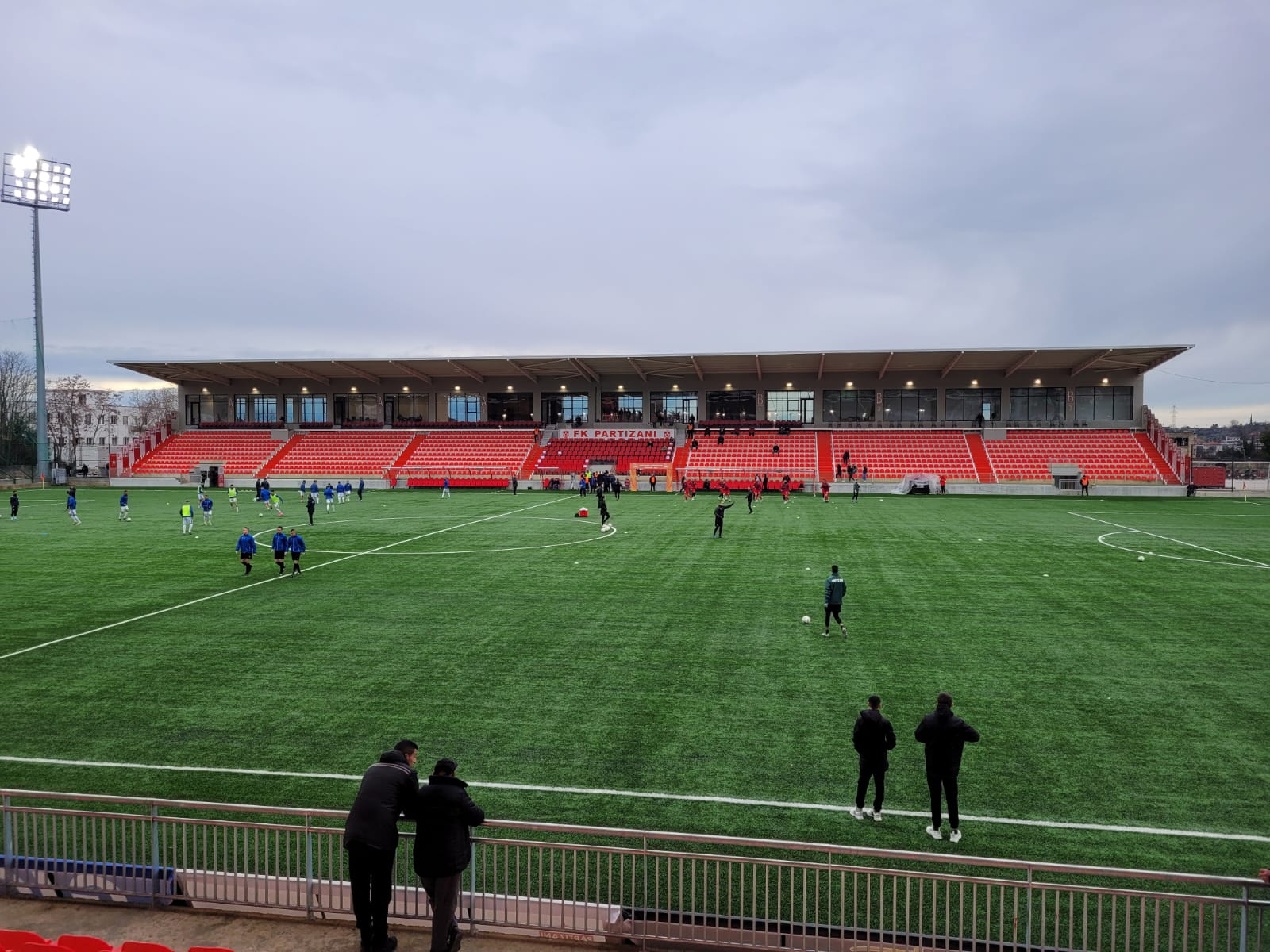
Arena E Demave

On 9 March 2016, the Albanian government agreed to a 99-year, €1 lease of the 37,000-square-metre (400,000 sq ft) Military Base 4030, located on Myslym Keta Road on the outskirts of Tirana, which is where Partizani will build their new training complex as well as their proposed 4,500 seater stadium.

Tirana's mayor, in a meeting with FK Partizani and FK Tirana, granted Partizani the right to play in Tirana's stadium until "Qemal Stafa Stadium" is finished building.

In 2019, Partizani moved to the newly built Arena Kombëtare. On 13 December 2019, they played first match at the new stadium against rivals KF Tirana, which also plays some matches at the stadium. They lost the match 2–1 with a Winful Cobbinah goal at the last minute of the match, which was the first loss for the club in the derbies after 5 years and 8 months and after 18 games.

== Supporters ==
Ultras Guerrils 46
- Abbreviation: UG0809
- Established: 2008
- Type: Supporters' group
- Club: FK Partizani Tirana
- Motto: Përjetë me ty, Partizon (Forever with you, Partizon)
- Headquarters: Tirana; Laprakë; Kombinat; 21 Dhjetori, Albania
- Affiliations: Baza 46

=== Ultras Guerrils ===
Partizani Tirana's current supporters group and hooligans firm is called Ultras Guerrils 08–09, who were founded following the merger of two other supports groups, Brigada e Kuqe 08 and Komandos Ultras. They are one of the most numerous and consistent supporters in Albania, attending the team's Albanian Second Division matches. Despite their history, name and colours they are not affiliated with any political party. Partizani has many supporters outside Albania, such as Kosovo Albanians and Macedonian Albanians. Apart from the aforementioned groups, the ultras are supported by the Albanian diaspora in Norway and Sweden.

=== Rivalries ===
The club's biggest rivalry is with KF Tirana. The Tirana derby is the name given to any football match contested between Partizani Tirana and KF Tirana football clubs, the two biggest rivals in Tirana in Albania. Partizani Tirana have a historical advantage of 25 wins ahead of KF Tirana in the League with 67 wins. Also the team recorded the best ever result in the match which still remains as 8-0 from 1947. The other main rivalry in the city is with Dinamo Tirana.

=== Record transfers ===
Rank	Player	To	Fee	Year
1.	(Albania) Xhuliano Skuka	(France) FC Metz	€1.40m	2023
2.	(Republic of the Congo) Chandrel Massanga	(Turkey) Hatayspor	€600k	2024
3.	(Albania) Arinaldo Rrapaj	(Ukraine) Kolos Kovalivka	€500k	2024
3.	(Senegal) Maguette Gueye	(Spain) Racing de Santander	€500k	2024
3.	(Albania) Erjon Bogdani	(Turkey) Gençlerbirliği	€500k	1998
4.	(Albania) Perlat Musta	(Romania) Dinamo Bucuresti	€400k	1992
5.	(Albania) Lorenc Trashi	(Kuwait) Qadsia SC	€250k	2021
5.	(Albania) Dorian Bylykbashi	(Ukraine) Kryvbas	€250k	2007

== Recent seasons ==
Season	Division	Pos.	Pl.	W	D	L	GS	GA	P	Cup	Supercup	Europe		Top scorer
2013–14	Kategoria Superiore	5th	33	15	8	10	33	26	53	SR	—	—	—	(North Macedonia) Nderim Nexhipi (Albania) Migen Memelli 6
2014–15	Kategoria Superiore	3rd	36	22	7	7	42	24	73	QF	—	—	—	(Serbia) Stevan Račić 14
2015–16	Kategoria Superiore	2nd	36	21	11	4	51	21	74	QF	—	UEL	1QR	(Albania) Xhevahir Sukaj 21
2016–17	Kategoria Superiore	2nd	36	19	15	2	46	17	72	SR	—	UCH; UEL	3QR; PO	(Ghana) Caleb Ekuban 17
2017–18	Kategoria Superiore	5th	36	15	8	13	41	36	53	QF	—	UEL	1QR	(Albania) Gerhard Progni 10
2018–19	Kategoria Superiore	1st	36	20	10	6	45	22	70	QF	—	UEL	1QR	(Albania) Jasir Asani 10
2019–20	Kategoria Superiore	6th	36	15	8	13	51	40	53	SR	W	UCH; UEL	1QR; 2QR	(Albania) Eraldo Çinari 13
2020–21	Kategoria Superiore	3rd	36	17	14	5	53	23	65	QF	—	—	—	(Albania) Eraldo Çinari (Albania) Jasir Asani 9
2021–22	Kategoria Superiore	3rd	36	15	13	8	52	30	58	SF	—	UCO	2QR	(Brazil) Stênio Júnior 12
2022–23	Kategoria Superiore	1st	36	20	7	9	56	37	67	QF	—	UCO	1QR	(Brazil) Victor da Silva 13
2023–24	Kategoria Superiore	2nd	38	18	12	8	52	30	66	QF	W	UCH; UCO	1QR; PO	(Republic of the Congo) Archange Bintsouka 10
2024–25	Kategoria Superiore	3rd	38	14	15	9	40	34	56	SF	—	UCO	2QR	(Republic of the Congo) Archange Bintsouka 6
2025–26	Kategoria Superiore	5th	36	13	9	14	38	48	48	QF	—	UCO	1QR	(Azerbaijan) Vusal Isgandarli 6
2026–27	Kategoria Superiore										—	—	—	

== Divisional movements ==
Series	Years	Last	Promotions	Relegations
Kategoria Superiore	73	2025–26	30 times to Europe	▼2 (1999–2000, 2008–09)
Kategoria e Parë	6	2012–13	▲2 (2000–01, 2012–13)	▼1 (2010–11)
Kategoria e Dytë	1	2011–12	▲1 (2011–12 )	▼0

== Honours ==
Type	Competition	Titles	Seasons
Domestic	Kategoria Superiore	17	1947, 1948, 1949, 1954, 1957, 1958, 1959, 1961, 1962–63, 1963–64, 1970–71, 1978–79, 1980–81, 1986–87, 1992–93, 2018–19, 2022–23
Domestic	Kategoria e Parë	1	2000–01
Domestic	Albanian Cup	15	1948, 1949, 1957, 1958, 1961, 1963–64, 1965–66, 1967–68, 1969–70, 1972–73, 1979–80, 1990–91, 1992–93, 1996–97, 2003–04
Domestic	Albanian Supercup	3	2004, 2019, 2023
Domestic	Double	7	1948, 1949, 1957, 1958, 1961, 1963–64, 1992–93
Europe	Balkans Cup	1	1970

== Partizani in Europe ==
UEFA club coefficient ranking As of 4 January 2026
Rank	Team	Points
184	(Kazakhstan) Tobol Kostanay	6.000
185	(Estonia) Flora	6.000
186	(Albania) Partizani	6.000
187	(Montenegro) Budućnost	6.000
188	(Andorra) Inter Club d'Escaldes	6.000

Season	Competition	Round	Club	Home	Away	Aggregate
1960–61	Balkans Cup	1/5	(Romania) Steagul Roșu Brașov	0–0	0–1	3rd
1960–61	Balkans Cup	1/5	(Bulgaria) Levski Sofia	2–0	0–4	3rd
1960–61	Balkans Cup	1/5	(Turkey) Fenerbahçe	0–0	0–1	3rd
1960–61	Balkans Cup	1/5	(Greece) AEK Athens	3–0	3–0	3rd
1962–63	UEFA European Cup	1R	(Sweden) IFK Norrköping	1–1	0–2	1–3
1963–64	UEFA European Cup	1R	(Bulgaria) Spartak Plovdiv	1–0	1–3	2–3
1964–65	UEFA European Cup	1R	(West Germany) 1. FC Köln	0–0	0–2	0–2
1966–67	Balkans Cup	GS	(Bulgaria) Cherno More Varna	2–0	1–3	2nd
1966–67	Balkans Cup	GS	(Romania) UTA Arad	2–0	2–1	2nd
1966–67	Balkans Cup	GS	(Turkey) Fenerbahçe	2–0	2–3	2nd
1968–69	European Cup Winners' Cup	1R	(Italy) Torino	1–0	1–3	2–3
1970	Balkans Cup	GS	(Socialist Federal Republic of Yugoslavia) Sloboda Tuzla	1–2	1–1	1st
1970	Balkans Cup	GS	(Romania) Universitatea Craiova	1–0	0–1	1st
1970	Balkans Cup	Final	(Bulgaria) Beroe Stara Zagora	3–0	1–1	4–1
1970–71	UEFA Cup Winners' Cup	QR	(Sweden) Åtvidabergs FF	2–0	1–1	3–1
1970–71	UEFA Cup Winners' Cup	1R	(Austria) Tirol Innsbruck	1–2	2–3	3–5
1971–72	UEFA European Cup	1R	(Bulgaria) CSKA Sofia	0–1	0–3	0–4
1974	Balkans Cup	GS	(Socialist Federal Republic of Yugoslavia) Vardar	2–1	0–2	3rd
1974	Balkans Cup	GS	(Greece) Larissa	2–2	1–3	3rd
1979–80	UEFA European Cup	1R	(Scotland) Celtic	1–0	1–4	2–4
1979–80	Balkans Cup	GS	(Socialist Federal Republic of Yugoslavia) Rijeka	4–1	0–3	2nd
1979–80	Balkans Cup	GS	(Greece) PAS Giannina	2–0	0–3	2nd
1980–81	European Cup Winners' Cup	1R	(Sweden) Malmö FF	0–0	0–1	0–1
1981–82	UEFA European Cup	1R	Austria Wien	1–0	1–3	2–3
1987–88	UEFA European Cup	1R	(Portugal) Benfica	w/o	0–4	0–4
1990–91	UEFA Cup	1R	(Romania) Universitatea Craiova	0–1	0–1	0–2
1991–92	European Cup Winners' Cup	1R	(Netherlands) Feyenoord	0–0	0–1	0–1
1993–94	UEFA Champions League	QR	(Iceland) IA Akranes	0–0	0–3	0–3
1995–96	UEFA Cup	QR	(Turkey) Fenerbahçe	0–4	0–2	0–6
2002–03	UEFA Cup	QR	(Israel) Hapoel Tel Aviv	1–4	0–1	1–5
2003	UEFA Intertoto Cup	1R	(Israel) Maccabi Netanya	2–0	1–3	3–3
2003	UEFA Intertoto Cup	2R	(Moldova) Dacia Chișinău	0–3	0–2	0–5
2004–05	UEFA Cup	1QR	(Malta) Birkirkara	4–2	1–2	5–4
2004–05	UEFA Cup	2QR	(Israel) Hapoel Bnei Sakhnin	1–3	0–3	1–6
2006	UEFA Intertoto Cup	1R	(Cyprus) Ethnikos Achnas	2–1	2–4	4–5
2008–09	UEFA Cup	1QR	(Bosnia and Herzegovina) Široki Brijeg	1–3	0–0	1–3
2015–16	UEFA Europa League	1QR	(Norway) Strømsgodset	0–1	1–3	1–4
2016–17	UEFA Europa League	1QR	(Slovakia) Slovan Bratislava	0–0	Bye (Note: Partizani was transferred to 2016–17 UEFA Champions League second qualifying round following the exclusion of Skënderbeu by UEFA for match-fixing.)	
2016–17	UEFA Champions League	2QR (Note: Skënderbeu would have qualified for the Champions League second qualifying round as the champions of the 2015–16 Kategoria Superiore, but were excluded from participating in the 2016–17 European competitions by UEFA for match-fixing. They appealed the decision to the Court of Arbitration for Sport, and UEFA agreed to suspend the exclusion and Skënderbeu were included in the second qualifying round draw. The final decision to exclude Skënderbeu was made by the Court of Arbitration for Sport on 6 July 2016, before the second qualifying round was played. As a result, the berth was given to the runners-up Partizani.)	(Hungary) Ferencváros	1–1	1–1	2–2 (3–1p)
2016–17	UEFA Champions League	3QR	(Austria) Red Bull Salzburg	0–1	0–2	0–3
2016–17	UEFA Europa League	PO	(Russia) Krasnodar	0–0	0–4	0–4
2017–18	UEFA Europa League	1QR	(Bulgaria) Botev Plovdiv	1–3	0–1	1–4
2018–19	UEFA Europa League	1QR	(Slovenia) Maribor	0−1	0–2	0–3
2019–20	UEFA Champions League	1QR	(Azerbaijan) Qarabağ	0–0	0–2	0–2
2019–20	UEFA Europa League	2QR	(Moldova) Sheriff Tiraspol	0–1	1–1	1–2
2021–22	UEFA Europa Conference League	1QR	(Moldova) Sfântul Gheorghe	5–2	3–2	8–4
2021–22	UEFA Europa Conference League	2QR	(Switzerland) Basel	0−2	0–3	0−5
2022–23	UEFA Europa Conference League	1QR	(Georgia (country)) Saburtalo Tbilisi	0–1	1–0	1–1 (4–5p)
2023–24	UEFA Champions League	1QR	(Belarus) BATE Borisov	1–1	0–2	1–3
2023–24	UEFA Europa Conference League	2QR	(Andorra) Atlètic d'Escaldes	4–1	1–0	5–1
2023–24	UEFA Europa Conference League	3QR	(Latvia) Valmiera	1–0	2–1	3–1
2023–24	UEFA Europa Conference League	PO	(Kazakhstan) Astana	1–1	0–1	1–2
2024–25	UEFA Conference League	1QR	(Malta) Marsaxlokk	1–1	2–1	3−2
2024–25	UEFA Conference League	2QR	(Georgia (country)) Iberia 1999	0–0	0–2	0–2
2025–26	UEFA Conference League	1QR	(Estonia) Nõmme Kalju	0–1	1–1	1–2

Notes

- QR: Qualifying round
- 1R: First round
- 2R: Second round
- 3QR: Third round
- PO: Play-off round
- GS: Group stage

== Players ==
=== Current squad ===
As of 1 September 2026

Note: Flags indicate national team as defined under FIFA eligibility rules; some limited exceptions apply. Players may hold more than one non-FIFA nationality.

No.	Pos.	Nation	Player
1	GK	ALB	Darius Zadeja
2	DF	ALB	Marjus Kola
3	DF	MKD	David Atanaskoski
4	DF	KOS	Andi Janjeva
5	MF	CIV	Arafat Doumbia
6	MF	GAM	Baboucarr Jatta
7	FW	KOS	Altin Aliu
8	MF	KOS	Redon Ismaili
9	FW	ALB	Albers Keko
10	FW	ALB	Xhuliano Skuka (captain)
14	FW	ALB	Elson Himallari
15	DF	BIH	Aleksandar Jovičić
16	FW	ALB	Fabio Hyseni
17	FW	ALB	Endri Çelaj
18	MF	RSA	Rowan Human
19	MF	ALB	Dion Vata

No.	Pos.	Nation	Player
21	MF	ALB	Valentino Murataj
22	DF	ALB	Albion Marku
23	DF	ALB	Marçelino Preka (vice-captain)
24	FW	CGO	Archange Bintsouka
25	FW	ALB	Rrok Toma
26	DF	ALB	Paulo Buxhelaj
32	DF	ALB	Jurgen Bakalli
33	FW	NGR	David Fadairo
39	MF	NGR	Kazeem Ogunleye
40	GK	ALB	Skander Tahri
44	DF	ALB	Alesio Mija
51	FW	CIV	Sekou Sidibe
60	GK	ALB	Pano Qirko
77	FW	ALB	Nebi Qokthi
97	DF	BIH	Omar Pašagić
99	MF	ALB	Sebastjan Spahiu

=== Out on loan ===
Note: Flags indicate national team as defined under FIFA eligibility rules; some limited exceptions apply. Players may hold more than one non-FIFA nationality.

No.	Pos.	Nation	Player
—	DF	ALB	Ersi Kapo (on loan at Besa)
—	MF	KOS	Adnard Mehmeti (on loan at Vllaznia)
—	MF	ALB	Gjergji Kote (on loan at Drenica)

No.	Pos.	Nation	Player
—	MF	ALB	Mateo Shanaj (on loan at Pogradeci)
—	FW	COL	Diego Contreras (on loan at Arsimi)

=== Under-19 squad ===
Note: Flags indicate national team as defined under FIFA eligibility rules; some limited exceptions apply. Players may hold more than one non-FIFA nationality.

No.	Pos.	Nation	Player
1	GK	ALB	Darius Zadeja
2	DF	ALB	Robin Balla
3	DF	ALB	Frensi Mali
4	DF	ALB	Rinaldo Nela
5	DF	ALB	Uesli Arapi
6	MF	ALB	Riseld Hoçja
7	FW	ALB	Erald Rrenga (captain)
8	FW	ALB	Musa Lleshaj
9	FW	ALB	Oresti Nela
11	FW	ALB	Elson Himallari

No.	Pos.	Nation	Player
13	DF	ALB	Rejan Caslli
14	MF	ALB	Alfons Marinaj
17	MF	ALB	Jon Çaushi
18	MF	ALB	Odisea Gjati
19	FW	ALB	Fabio Hyseni
23	FW	ALB	Ergit Hyka
24	DF	ALB	Arjol Lataj
25	MF	ALB	Reinald Krrashi
27	FW	ALB	Rei Zekaj
70	GK	ALB	Klaus Qefalia

== Current staff ==
Position	Name
Head Coach	(Bosnia and Herzegovina) Mislav Karoglan
Assistant manager	(Albania) Realf Zhivanaj
Physical Coach	(Romania) Andrei Neagu
Second Physical Coach	(Albania) Oriand Abazaj
Forward Coach	(Albania) Rezart Maho
Goalkeeping Coach	(Albania) Alban Hoxha
Video Analist	(Romania) Florin Iană
President	(Albania) Gazmend Demi
General director	(Albania) Olsi Rama
General director club	(North Macedonia) Agim Ibraimi
General Secretary	(Albania) Gerald Burba
Academy Director	(Albania) Genc Tomorri
Team Manager	(Albania) Amarildo Dajlani
Team doctor	(Albania) Dhimosten Gjici
Physiotherapist	(Albania) Ergys Rexha
Athletic coach	(Croatia) Marko Matijević
Label Security Person	(Albania) Naim Dani
Coach B Squad	(Albania) Alfred Deliallisi
Coach U–19	(Albania) Fatjon Muhameti
Coach U–17	(Albania) Oriand Abazaj
Coach Partizani Women	(Albania) Cyme Lulaj

== List of managers ==
- (Albania) Sllave Llambi (1946–1949)
- (Albania) Myslym Alla (1954–1956)
- (Soviet Union) Nikolay Lyukshinov (1956–1957)
- (Albania) Rexhep Spahiu (1956–1962)
- (Albania) Loro Boriçi (1962–1971)
- (Albania) Bejkush Birçe (1971–1973)
- (Albania) Ilia Shuke (1974–1977)
- (Albania) Bejkush Birçe (1978–1984)
- (Albania) Neptun Bajko (1986–1988)
- (Albania) Sulejman Starova (1990–1994)
- (Albania) Hasan Lika (1994–1995)
- (Albania) Ramadan Shehu (1995–1996)
- (Albania) Perlat Musta (1997–1998)
- (Albania) Edmond Gëzdari (1998–1999)
- (Albania) Genc Tomorri (2000–2001)
- (Albania) Neptun Bajko (2001)
- (Bulgaria) Nikolay Arabov (2001)
- (Albania) Shpëtim Duro (2001–2002)
- (Italy) Tiziano Gori (2002)
- (Albania) Neptun Bajko (2002–2003)
- (Albania) Ilir Spahiu (2003)
- (Albania) Sulejman Mema (2003–2004)
- (Albania) Ilir Shulku (2004)
- (Albania) Ramadan Shehu (5 Oct 2004 – 20 October 2004)
- (Albania) Sulejman Mema (2004–2005)
- (Albania) Neptun Bajko (Jul 2005 – 17 September 2005)
- (Albania) Sulejman Mema (17 Sep 2005 – 16 November 2005)
- (Albania) Sulejman Starova (16 Nov 2005 – Jun 2006)
- (Albania) Neptun Bajko (Jul 2006 – 2 November 2007)
- (Albania) Hasan Lika (2 Nov 2006 – 26 October 2008)
- (Albania) Shpëtim Duro (26 Oct 2008 – May 2009)
- (Albania) Eduart Zhupa (Jul 2009– Oct 2010)
- (Albania) Skerdi Bejzade (2009–2010)
- (Albania) Gerd Haxhiu (2010)
- (Albania) Neptun Bajko (2010–2011)
- (Albania) Ylli Shehu (2011)
- (Albania) Perlat Musta (2012)
- (Greece) Nikolaos Kokkinos (2012)
- (Albania) Perlat Musta (2012)
- (Albania) Nikolin Coçlli (Jul 2012 – 25 November 2012)
- (Albania) Shpëtim Duro (25 Nov 2012 – 4 March 2013)
- (Albania) Hasan Lika (4 Mar 2013 – 10 February 2014)
- (Portugal) Márcio Sampaio (10 Feb 2014 – 6 May 2014)
- (Albania) Genc Tomorri (6 May 2014 – Jun 2014)
- (Albania) Shpëtim Duro (2014–2015)
- (Albania) Sulejman Starova (Jul 2015 – 4 January 2016)
- (Italy) Andrea Agostinelli (4 Jan 2016 – Jun 2016)
- (Albania) Klevis Dalipi (Jun 2016 – Jul 2016)
- (Italy) Adolfo Sormani (Jul 2016 – Oct 2016)
- (Albania) Sulejman Starova (Oct 2016 – Jul 2017)
- (Italy) Mark Iuliano (Jul 2017 – Nov 2017)
- (Albania) Sulejman Starova (Nov 2017 – Mar 2018)
- (Albania) Klevis Dalipi (Mar 2018 – Jun 2018)
- (Albania) Skënder Gega (Jul 2018 – May 2019)
- (Italy) Franco Lerda (Jun 2019 – Dec 2019)
- (Albania) Renaldo Kalari (Dec 2019 – Jan 2020)
- (Italy) Adolfo Sormani (Jan 2020 – Jun 2020)
- (Albania) Ilir Daja (Jun 2020 – Dec 2021)
- (Albania) Dritan Mehmeti (Dec 2021 – Aug 2022)
- (Italy) Giovanni Colella (Aug 2022 – Jun 2023)
- (Croatia) Zoran Zekić (Jun 2023 – Oct 2023)
- (Albania) Arbër Abilaliaj (Oct 2023 – Dec 2023)
- (Albania) Orges Shehi (Dec 2023 – Aug 2024)
- (Albania) Arbër Abilaliaj (Aug 2024 – Aug 2024)
- (Serbia) Aleksandar Veselinović (Aug 2024 – Feb 2025)
- (Albania) Arbër Abilaliaj (Feb 2025 – Mar 2025)
- (Albania) Skënder Gega (Mar 2025 – Jul 2025)
- (Albania) Fatjon Muhameti (Jul 2025 – Aug 2025)
- (Serbia) Mladen Milinković (Aug 2025 – Oct 2025)
- (Albania) Oltijon Kërnaja (Oct 2025 – Apr 2026)
- (Albania) Realf Zhivanaj (May 2026 – Jun 2026)
- (Romania) Florin Bratu (Jun 2026 – Oct 2026)
- (Bosnia and Herzegovina) Mislav Karoglan (Oct 2026 –)

=== Title winning managers ===
Name	Period	Trophies
(Albania) Sllave Llambi	1946–1949	National Championship (3), Republic Cup (2)
(Albania) Myslym Alla	1954–1956	National Championship, Republic Cup
(Albania) Rexhep Spahiu	1956–1962	National Championship (4), Republic Cup (3)
(Albania) Loro Boriçi	1962–1971	National Championship (3), Republic Cup (2), Balkans Cup
(Albania) Ilia Shuke	1974–1977	National Championship
(Albania) Bejkush Birçe	1977–1984	National Championship (2)
(Albania) Neptun Bajko	1986–1988	National Championship
(Albania) Sulejman Starova	1992–1994	National Championship, Albanian Cup
(Albania) Sulejman Mema	2003–2004	Albanian Cup, Albanian Supercup
(Albania) Skënder Gega	2018–2019	Kategoria Superiore, Albanian Supercup
(Italy) Franco Lerda	2019	Albanian Supercup
(Italy) Giovanni Colella	2022–2023	Kategoria Superiore
(Albania) Arbër Abilaliaj (i)	2023	Albanian Supercup,

== Sponsorship ==
Period	Kit manufacturer	Shirt sponsor
1985–1992	Adidas	—
1992–1993	—	Abaco
2003–2004	Legea	AMC
2004–2005	Adidas	Neri
2007–2008	Legea	A.K.K.
2008–2009	Adidas	—
2013–2014	Legea	Albtelecom
2014–2015	Legea	—
2015–2016	Adidas	—
2016–2017	Macron	—
2017–2018	Joma	—
2018–2019	Joma	MCN TV
2019-2020	Joma	MCN TV
2020–2029	Macron	MCN TV
