= Zyber Konçi =

Albanian football manager (1927–2015)

Personal information
- Date of birth: 1 January 1927
- Place of birth: Tirana, Albania
- Date of death: 19 January 2015 (aged 88)
- Place of death: Tirana, Albania

Managerial career
- Years: Team
- 1959–1961: Dinamo
- 1963–1965: Albania
- 1971–1975: 17 Nëntori
- 1980: Albania

Zyber Konçi (1 January 1927 – 19 January 2015) was a football coach who coached the Albania national team.

== Managerial career ==
Konçi had two spells as Albania's coach, in 1963-65 and 1980. He was the first coach to lead Albania in the qualifiers of a major tournament, those of the 1964 European Nations' Cup, where he also obtained the first victory for Albania in such tournaments' qualifiers, against Denmark.

He was the coach that played the youngest player ever on the Albania national team, Dinamo's Iljaz Çeço, at only 17, in a friendly against Algeria on 11 October 1964 that finished in a 1–1 draw.

== Personal life and death ==
Konçi was educated in Czechoslovakia and introduced scientific methods at the Albanian Institute of Physical Culture and Sports; he also was the founder of the famous Shkëndija Tiranë football academy, which produced many Albanian football talents. He died on 19 January 2015, at the age of 88.
