= 1996–97 Albanian Cup =

Kupa e Shqipërisë

Tournament details
- Country: Albania

Final positions
- Champions: Partizani
- Runners-up: Flamurtari

1996–97 Albanian Cup (Albanian: Kupa e Shqipërisë) was the forty-fifth season of Albania's annual cup competition. The football competition began in August 1996 with the First Round and ended on 3 May 1997 with the Final match. The winners of the competition qualified for the 1997–98 first round of the UEFA Cup. KF Tirana were the defending champions, having won their ninth Albanian Cup last season. The cup was won by Partizani.

Except of semifinals, other rounds were played in a two-legged format similar to those of European competitions. If the aggregated score was tied after both games, the team with the higher number of away goals advanced. If the number of away goals was equal in both games, the match was decided by extra time and a penalty shootout, if necessary.

== First round ==
Games were played on August & September 1996

Team 1	Agg.	Team 2	1st leg	2nd leg
Durrësi	0–7	Teuta	0–3	0–4
Besëlidhja	2–6	Partizani	0–1	2–5
Selenica	2–11	Flamurtari	1–5	1–6
Kastrioti	2–8	Olimpik	1–4	1–4
Tepelena	2–14	Apolonia	2–1	0–13
Egnatia	0–5	Besa	0–0	0–5
Pogradeci	1–4	Sopoti	1–2	0–2
Lushnja	2–2 (4–2 p)	Shkumbini	2–0	0–2
Burreli	1–4	Vllaznia	1–0	0–4
Bylis	4–5	Albpetrol	3–1	1–4
Korabi	2–8	Laçi	1–4	1–4
Cërriku	0–12	Elbasani	0–8	0–4
Naftëtari	2–7	Tomori	2–3	0–4
Përmeti	0–2	Shqiponja	0–0	0–2
Gramozi	2–11	Skënderbeu	2–2	0–9
Albanët	2–8	Tirana	1–1	1–7

== Second round ==
All sixteen teams of the 1995–96 Superliga and First Division entered in this round. First and second legs were played in January 1997.

Team 1	Agg.	Team 2	1st leg	2nd leg
Albpetrol	1–4	Besa	0–3	1–1
Elbasani	3–4	Olimpik	3–2	0–2
Laçi	2–2	Apolonia	2–1	0–1
Lushnja	1–0	Tirana	0–0	1–0
Shqiponja	1–1 (4–5 p)	Partizani	1–0	0–1
Skënderbeu	1–2	Teuta	1–0	0–2
Tomori	2–6	Flamurtari	2–2	0–4
Vllaznia	4–3	Sopoti	3–1	1–2

== Quarter-finals ==
In this round entered the 8 winners from the previous round.

Team 1	Agg.	Team 2	1st leg	2nd leg
Apolonia	1–1 (a)	Olimpik	1–1	0–0
Besa	3–3	Flamurtari	3–2	0–1
Lushnja	1–0	Teuta	1–0	0–0
Vllaznia	2–3	Partizani	2–0	0–3

== Semi-finals ==
In this round entered the four winners from the previous round.

Team 1	Score	Team 2
Olimpik	0–2	Flamurtari
Partizani	2–1	Lushnja

== Final ==
3 May 1997
16:00

Partizani	2–2	Flamurtari
Milori 12'; Shulku 63'		Alliu 30'; Perloshi 56'
Penalties
Milori (penalty scored); Daiu (penalty missed); Peço (penalty scored); Shulku (penalty scored); Riza (penalty scored)	4–3	(penalty scored) Daullja; (penalty scored) Arapi; (penalty missed) Haxhiaj; (penalty scored) Muka; (penalty missed) Prenga

Qemal Stafa Stadium, Tirana
Attendance: 11,000
Referee: Bujar Pregja
