= 1970–71 Albanian National Championship =

Albanian National Championship
- Season: 1970–71
- Champions: Partizani; 11th Albanian title
- Relegated: Besëlidhja; Apolonia
- European Cup: Partizani
- UEFA Cup: Vllaznia
- Cup Winners' Cup: Dinamo Tirana
- Matches: 182
- Goals: 381 (2.09 per match)
- Top goalscorer: Ilir Përnaska (19 goals)

The 1970–71 Albanian National Championship was the 32nd season of the Albanian National Championship, the top professional league for association football clubs, since its establishment in 1930.

== Overview ==
It was contested by 14 teams, and Partizani won the championship.

== League table ==
Pos	Team	Pld	W	D	L	GF	GA	GD	Pts	Qualification or relegation
1	Partizani (C)	26	16	8	2	48	19	+29	40	Qualification for the European Cup first round
2	Dinamo Tirana	26	15	9	2	45	19	+26	39	Qualification for the Cup Winners' Cup first round
3	Vllaznia	26	12	10	4	37	18	+19	34	Qualification for the UEFA Cup first round
4	Labinoti	26	12	9	5	33	23	+10	33	
5	Besa	26	10	11	5	36	22	+14	31	
6	Skënderbeu	26	10	8	8	25	19	+6	28	
7	17 Nëntori	26	9	9	8	32	21	+11	27	
8	Lokomotiva Durrës	26	7	12	7	23	22	+1	26	
9	Flamurtari	26	3	14	9	16	24	−8	20	
10	Tomori	26	5	10	11	24	36	−12	20	
11	Luftëtari	26	6	8	12	21	40	−19	20	
12	Traktori	26	4	11	11	15	29	−14	19	
13	Besëlidhja (R)	26	3	10	13	15	34	−19	16	Relegation to the 1971–72 Kategoria e Dytë
14	Apolonia (R)	26	2	7	17	11	55	−44	11	Relegation to the 1971–72 Kategoria e Dytë

Source: RSSSF.org
(C) Champions; (R) Relegated

Note: 'Labinoti' is Elbasani, '17 Nëntori' is Tirana, 'Lokomotiva Durrës' is Teuta, 'Traktori' is Lushnja

== Results ==
Home \ Away	17N	APO	BES	BSL	DIN	FLA	LAB	LOK	LUF	PAR	SKË	TOM	TRA	VLL
17 Nëntori		5–0	1–0	1–0	0–1	2–1	1–1	1–0	5–1	1–1	1–1	2–0	2–0	0–1
Apolonia	0–4		1–1	0–0	0–2	1–1	1–1	0–2	1–0	1–2	1–2	1–1	1–1	0–2
Besa	1–1	5–0		5–2	2–1	1–1	4–1	1–1	1–1	0–0	2–0	0–0	2–0	2–1
Besëlidhja	0–0	0–0	0–1		0–0	1–0	0–2	0–1	1–0	2–4	0–0	2–2	3–0	1–1
Dinamo	1–0	4–0	1–1	2–0		1–0	1–1	3–0	1–2	2–1	2–0	4–0	3–0	3–2
Flamurtari	1–0	0–1	1–0	1–1	1–1		1–1	1–1	1–1	1–2	0–0	1–0	0–0	2–2
Labinoti	2–0	1–0	0–1	2–0	3–3	0–0		1–0	2–1	1–2	2–0	1–0	3–1	2–0
Lokomotiva	1–1	3–0	0–0	1–0	0–0	3–1	0–0		2–2	2–1	1–1	1–1	2–1	1–1
Luftëtari	0–0	2–1	2–1	0–0	1–2	1–1	1–2	1–0		0–2	1–0	2–1	0–0	1–1
Partizani	2–1	4–0	1–1	5–1	1–1	1–0	2–1	1–1	6–0		0–0	3–1	2–0	1–0
Skënderbeu	1–0	2–0	2–0	2–0	1–2	1–0	4–1	0–0	2–0	1–2		1–0	4–1	0–0
Tomori	2–2	4–1	1–1	2–0	2–3	0–0	0–2	1–0	2–1	0–1	0–0		2–1	1–1
Traktori	1–1	1–0	0–1	0–0	1–1	0–0	0–0	1–0	4–0	0–0	1–0	1–1		0–0
Vllaznia	2–0	5–0	3–2	2–1	0–0	2–0	0–0	2–0	1–0	1–1	2–0	4–0	1–0	

Source: CalcioMondialeWeb.it
Legend: Blue = home team win; Yellow = draw; Red = away team win.
