= 1947 Albanian National Championship =

Albanian National Championship
- Season: 1947
- Champions: Partizani

The 1947 Albanian National Championship was the tenth season of the Albanian National Championship, the top professional league for association football clubs, since its establishment in 1930.

== Overview ==
The league was contested by 9 teams. Partizani won the championship.

== League standings ==
Pos	Team	Pld	W	D	L	GF	GA	GR	Pts
1	Partizani (C)	16	14	1	1	56	15	3.733	29
2	Vllaznia	16	13	2	1	63	9	7.000	28
3	Dinamo Korça	16	9	6	1	48	16	3.000	24
4	Ylli i Kuq Durrës	16	6	3	7	30	25	1.200	15
5	17 Nëntori	16	5	4	7	26	51	0.510	14
6	Tomori	16	4	2	10	27	48	0.563	10
7	Flamurtari	16	3	3	10	20	42	0.476	9
8	Bashkimi Elbasanas	16	2	4	10	16	37	0.432	8
9	Shqiponja	16	3	1	12	12	55	0.218	7

Source: RSSSF.org
(C) Champions

Note: 'Dinamo Korça' is Skënderbeu, '17 Nëntori' is SK Tirana, 'Ylli i Kuq Durrës' is Teuta, 'Bashkimi Elbasanas' is KS Elbasani and 'Shqiponja' is Luftëtari

== Results ==
Home \ Away	17N	BAS	DIN	FLA	PAR	SHQ	TOM	VLL	YIK
17 Nëntori		4–2	2–2	3–3	2–4	3–1	3–2	0–6	0–0
Bashkimi Elbasanas	2–2		1–1	0–0	0–1	1–2	3–1	1–4	3–0
Dinamo Korça	6–0	2–0		3–1	1–1	9–0	5–1	1–1	3–0
Flamurtari	5–1	1–0	2–3		2–4	3–2	0–1	1–5	2–5
Partizani	8–0	3–0	3–1	3–0		6–0	5–2	2–1	7–2
Shqiponja	1–3	2–0	0–6	0–0	0–2		1–3	0–2	2–0
Tomori	1–2	2–2	2–3	3–0	2–5	4–1		2–5	1–1
Vllaznia	6–0	5–1	0–0	5–0	2–1	9–0	9–0		2–0
Ylli i Kuq Durrës	1–2	7–0	2–2	4–0	0–1	4–0	3–0	0–1	

Source: RSSSF.org
Legend: Blue = home team win; Yellow = draw; Red = away team win.
