= Sulejman Mema =

Albanian footballer and manager

Personal information
- Full name: Sulejman Haxhi Mema
- Date of birth: 17 November 1955 (age 70)
- Place of birth: Tirana, Albania
- Position: Midfielder

Team information
- Current team: Tirana B (manager)

Youth career
- 17 Nëntori

Senior career*
Years	Team	Apps	(Gls)
1973-1985	17 Nëntori		

International career
1983	Albania	1	(0)

Managerial career
- 1995–1996: Tirana
- 2002: Tirana
- 2003: Tirana
- 2003–2004: Partizani
- 2004–2005: Partizani
- 2005: Partizani
- 2008: Tirana
- 2016-: Tirana Youth
- * Club domestic league appearances and goals

Sulejman Haxhi Mema (born 17 November 1955) is an Albanian former football player and manager of Tirana Youth. He has also been head of refereeing at the Football Association of Albania.

== International career ==
He made his debut for Albania in an April 1983 European Championship qualification match against Northern Ireland, coming on as a second-half substitute for Shkëlqim Muça. It turned out to be his sole international match.

== Personal life ==
Sulejman was born into a football family, as he is the son of Haxhi Mema and the nephew of Ali Mema another former player and manager of Tirana, who in 2006 was honoured with the "Legend of Albanian Football" award by FAA. He is also the nephew of Osman Mema, Haxhi's brother, and cousin of Ardian Mema.

Mema is the principal of the Sports mastery school Loro Boriçi in Tirana.

== Honours ==
=== Player ===
- Albanian Superliga: 2

1982, 1985

=== Manager ===
Tirana

- Albanian Superliga: 1998–99, 2003–04
- Albanian Supercup: 2003, 2007
