= 2023–24 Kategoria Superiore =

Kategoria Superiore
- Season: 2023–24
- Dates: 26 August 2023 – 26 May 2024
- Champions: Egnatia; 1st title
- Relegated: Erzeni; Kukësi
- Champions League: Egnatia
- Conference League: Partizani; Vllaznia; Tirana
- Matches: 184
- Goals: 418 (2.27 per match)
- Top goalscorer: Bekim Balaj (18 goals)
- Biggest home win: Laçi 6–1 Teuta (15 September 2023); Vllaznia 5–0 Skëndërbeu (22 December 2023)
- Biggest away win: Egnatia 0–5 Tirana (24 December 2023)
- Highest scoring: Egnatia 4–3 Erzeni (14 September 2023); Laçi 6–1 Teuta (15 September 2023); Partizani 4–3 Kukësi (8 October 2023); Tirana 3–4 Skënderbeu (28 January 2024)
- Longest winning run: 6 matches Partizani
- Longest unbeaten run: 12 matches Partizani; Vllaznia
- Longest winless run: 16 matches Kukësi
- Longest losing run: 8 matches Kukësi
- All statistics correct as of 26 May 2024.

The 2023–24 Kategoria Superiore was the 85th official season, or 88th season of top-tier football in Albania (including three unofficial championships during World War II) and the 24th season under the name Kategoria Superiore. The season began on 26 August 2023 and ended on 26 May 2024. Egnatia won the league title on 26 May 2024, beating Partizani in the final match.

The winners of this season's Kategoria Superiore earned a place in the first qualifying round of the 2024–25 Champions League, with the second and third placed clubs earning a place in the first qualifying round of the 2024–25 Conference League.

== Teams ==
Two clubs have earned promotion from the Kategoria e Parë, Dinamo City and Skënderbeu (both promoted after a one-year absence). Bylis (relegated after only one year in the top flight) and Kastrioti (relegated after three years in the top flight) were relegated to Kategoria e Parë at the conclusion of last season.

=== Locations ===
2023–24 Kategoria Superiore teams.

Team	Home city	Stadium	Capacity	2022–23 season
Dinamo City	Tirana	Various		Runner-up (Kategoria e Parë)
Egnatia	Rrogozhinë	Egnatia Arena	4,000	3rd
Erzeni	Shijak	Egnatia Arena	4,000	8th
Kukësi	Kukës	Kukës Arena	6,322	7th
Laçi	Laç	Laçi Stadium	8,000	5th
Partizani	Tirana	Arena e Demave	4,500	Champion
Skënderbeu	Korçë	Skënderbeu Stadium	12,343	Champion (Kategoria e Parë)
Teuta	Durrës	Niko Dovana Stadium	12,040	6th
Tirana	Tirana	Various		2nd
Vllaznia	Shkodër	Loro Boriçi Stadium	16,000	4th

=== Stadiums ===
Dinamo City	Egnatia	Erzeni	Kukësi	Laçi
Various	Egnatia Arena	Egnatia Arena	Kukës Arena; UEFA stadium category	Laçi Stadium
	Capacity: 4,000	Capacity: 4,000	Capacity: 6,322	Capacity: 8,000
Partizani	Skënderbeu	Teuta	Tirana	Vllaznia
Arena e Demave	Skënderbeu Stadium	Niko Dovana Stadium	Various	Loro Boriçi Stadium; UEFA stadium category
Capacity: 4,500	Capacity: 12,343	Capacity: 12,040		Capacity: 16,000

=== Personnel and kits ===
Note: Flags indicate national team as has been defined under FIFA eligibility rules. Players and Managers may hold more than one non-FIFA nationality.

Team	President	Manager	Captain	Kit manufacturer	Shirt sponsor
Dinamo City	(Albania) Ardian Bardhi	(Albania) Dritan Mehmeti	(Albania) Rustem Hoxha	Macron	Durrës Yachts & Marina
Egnatia	(Albania) Agim Demrozi	(Albania) Edlir Tetova	(Albania) Renato Malota	Joma	Spitali Amavita
Erzeni	(Albania) Elton Arbana	(Albania) Alfred Deliallisi	(North Macedonia) Nehar Sadiki	Macron	Sinani
Kukësi	(Albania) Safet Gjici	(Albania) Bledar Devolli	(Albania) Angelo Tafa	Suzmar	Kevin Construction
Laçi	(Albania) Pashk Laska	(Albania) Armando Cungu	(Albania) Ajdi Dajko	Uhlsport	
Partizani	(Albania) Gazmend Demi	(Albania) Orges Shehi	(Albania) Alban Hoxha	Macron	
Skënderbeu	(Albania) Ardjan Takaj	(Serbia) Ivan Gvozdenović	(Albania) Dean Liço	Uhlsport	Caffè Quaranta
Teuta	(Albania) Edmond Hasanbelliu	(Albania) Edi Martini	(Albania) Blerim Kotobelli	Macron	Klinika 4-D
Tirana	(Albania) Refik Halili	(Albania) Bledi Shkëmbi	(North Macedonia) Filip Najdovski	Joma	
Vllaznia	(Albania) Alban Xhaferi	(Germany) Thomas Brdarić	(Albania) Bekim Balaj	Suzmar	Sigal

=== Managerial changes ===
Team	Outgoing manager	Manner of departure	Date of vacancy	Position in table	Incoming manager	Date of appointment
Vllaznia	(North Macedonia) Goce Sedloski	End of contract	31 May 2023	Pre-season	(Albania) Migen Memelli	6 June 2023
Teuta	(Albania) Edi Martini	Mutual consent	3 June 2023	Pre-season	(Italy) Diego Longo	16 June 2023
Partizani	(Italy) Giovanni Colella	Resigned	7 June 2023	Pre-season	(Croatia) Zoran Zekić	12 June 2023
Dinamo City	(Albania) Dritan Mehmeti	Mutual consent	1 August 2023	Pre-season	(Italy) Luigi Di Biagio	1 August 2023
Laçi	(Albania) Stavri Nica	Sacked	29 August 2023	5th	(Albania) Skerdi Bejzade	31 August 2023
Kukësi	(Albania) Rrahman Hallaçi	Sacked	4 September 2023	10th	(Albania) Stavri Nica	4 September 2023
Teuta	(Italy) Diego Longo	Mutual consent	24 September 2023	8th	(Albania) Edi Martini	25 September 2023
Laçi	(Albania) Skerdi Bejzade	Mutual consent	29 September 2023	7th	(Albania) Mirel Josa	30 September 2023
Tirana	(Albania) Orges Shehi	Sacked	5 October 2023	4th	(Albania) Julian Ahmataj	5 October 2023
Partizani	(Croatia) Zoran Zekić	Signed by Osijek	10 October 2023	5th	(Albania) Arbër Abilaliaj	10 October 2023
Dinamo City	(Italy) Luigi Di Biagio	Resigned	22 October 2023	10th	(Albania) Dritan Mehmeti	25 October 2023
Vllaznia	(Albania) Migen Memelli	Mutual consent	29 October 2023	7th	(North Macedonia) Qatip Osmani	30 October 2023
Partizani	(Albania) Arbër Abilaliaj	End of caretaker spell	26 December 2023	2nd	(Albania) Orges Shehi	26 December 2023
Kukësi	(Albania) Stavri Nica	Resigned	31 January 2024	9th	(Albania) Emiliano Çela	31 January 2024
Erzeni	(Albania) Alfred Deliallisi	Mutual consent	8 February 2024	8th	(Albania) Skerdi Bejzade	8 February 2024
Kukësi	(Albania) Emiliano Çela	Resigned	17 February 2024	10th	(Albania) Bledar Devolli	17 February 2024
Tirana	(Albania) Julian Ahmataj	Sacked	20 February 2024	4th	(Albania) Erbim Fagu	20 February 2024
Laçi	(Albania) Mirel Josa	Mutual consent	3 March 2024	7th	(Albania) Armando Cungu	3 March 2024
Erzeni	(Albania) Skerdi Bejzade	Mutual consent	4 March 2024	9th	(Albania) Alfred Deliallisi	4 March 2024
Vllaznia	(North Macedonia) Qatip Osmani	Mutual consent	25 April 2024	2nd	(Germany) Thomas Brdarić	26 April 2024

== League table ==
Pos	Team	Pld	W	D	L	GF	GA	GD	Pts	Qualification or relegation
1	Egnatia (C)	36	18	9	9	51	38	+13	63 (Note: Ranked on head-to-head points: Egnatia 6, Partizani 3.)	Qualification for the Final four round
2	Partizani	36	17	12	7	51	29	+22	63	Qualification for the Final four round
3	Vllaznia	36	16	11	9	41	34	+7	59	Qualification for the Final four round
4	Skënderbeu	36	15	6	15	37	39	−2	51	Qualification for the Final four round
5	Tirana	36	13	11	12	56	49	+7	50 (Note: Ranked on head-to-head points (goal difference): Tirana 5 (+1), Teuta 5 (–1))	Qualification for the Conference League first qualifying round (Note: Egnatia, the winners of the 2023–24 Albanian Cup, finished in the top four while Skënderbeu, the fourth-placed team is banned from UEFA competitions. Therefore, the final Conference League berth was transferred from the fourth-placed team to the fifth-placed team.)
6	Teuta	36	13	11	12	36	35	+1	50	
7	Dinamo City	36	13	8	15	42	43	−1	47	
8	Laçi (O)	36	10	16	10	37	31	+6	46	Qualification for the relegation play-off
9	Erzeni (R)	36	7	11	18	29	57	−28	32	Relegation to the 2024–25 Kategoria e Parë
10	Kukësi (R)	36	6	9	21	31	56	−25	27	Relegation to the 2024–25 Kategoria e Parë

Source: Albanian Football Association
Rules for classification: 1) Points; 2) Head-to-head points; 3) Head-to-head goal difference; 4) Head-to-head goals scored; 5) Goal difference; 6) Goals scored; 7) Draw.
(C) Champions; (O) Play-off winners; (R) Relegated

== Results ==
Clubs will play each other four times for a total of 36 matches each.

=== First half of season ===
Home \ Away	DIN	EGN	ERZ	KUK	LAÇ	PAR	SKË	TEU	TIR	VLL
Dinamo	—	1–2	1–0	2–1	2–0	1–3	2–1	2–3	2–3	1–1
Egnatia	3–0	—	4–3	2–1	2–1	1–1	0–1	0–1	0–5	3–0
Erzeni	2–1	0–1	—	0–0	0–0	1–2	1–2	0–0	1–0	2–2
Kukësi	0–0	0–4	2–1	—	1–0	1–1	2–2	0–0	1–2	1–0
Laçi	0–1	0–2	3–3	1–1	—	0–1	2–0	6–1	2–2	2–1
Partizani	0–0	1–1	1–2	4–3	1–0	—	1–1	1–1	2–1	4–1
Skënderbeu	1–0	1–1	1–0	0–1	0–1	1–0	—	3–1	1–1	0–2
Teuta	1–2	2–2	0–1	0–0	1–1	0–1	1–0	—	2–2	0–1
Tirana	1–1	2–3	0–1	3–2	0–3	1–1	3–1	2–0	—	0–1
Vllaznia	3–1	0–2	1–1	3–1	0–0	0–0	5–0	2–0	0–1	—

Source: Albanian Football Association
Legend: Blue = home team win; Yellow = draw; Red = away team win.

=== Second half of season ===
Home \ Away	DIN	EGN	ERZ	KUK	LAÇ	PAR	SKË	TEU	TIR	VLL
Dinamo	—	0–1	2–0	3–2	0–0	2–1	2–0	1–0	2–3	0–1
Egnatia	1–1	—	3–2	1–0	0–0	2–1	1–0	0–0	0–3	0–1
Erzeni	0–4	1–0	—	3–3	0–0	0–4	0–3	0–3	0–2	0–1
Kukësi	1–1	1–4	1–2	—	1–0	0–1	0–2	0–2	2–3	2–0
Laçi	1–1	1–2	0–0	2–0	—	1–1	0–1	1–1	1–0	1–1
Partizani	2–0	1–1	4–0	3–0	1–2	—	1–0	1–0	2–1	0–0
Skënderbeu	0–1	2–0	1–0	1–0	1–1	1–0	—	0–1	0–0	0–1
Teuta	1–0	1–0	3–0	1–0	0–1	1–0	3–0	—	2–2	0–0
Tirana	3–2	1–1	1–1	1–0	1–1	1–2	3–4	1–2	—	0–0
Vllaznia	1–0	2–1	1–1	1–0	1–2	1–1	1–5	2–1	3–1	—

Source: Albanian Football Association
Legend: Blue = home team win; Yellow = draw; Red = away team win.

== Final four round ==
A draw was conducted in order to decide the semi-finals. Seeding of teams was based on their league ranking, with two seeded teams and two unseeded. In the semi-finals, in case of a tie after 90 minutes, the team with the higher league ranking will qualify to the final.

=== Bracket ===
Semi-finals
17 May
Partizani	1
Skënderbeu	0
19 May
Egnatia (b.p.)	0
Vllaznia	0

Final
26 May
Partizani	0
Egnatia	1
Third place play-off
24 May
Skënderbeu	3
Vllaznia	2

=== Semi-finals ===
17 May 2024
20:00

Partizani	1–0	Skënderbeu
Bintsouka 47'

Arena Kombëtare, Tirana
Attendance: 7,000
Referee: Enea Jorgji

19 May 2024
20:00

Egnatia	0–0	Vllaznia

Arena Kombëtare, Tirana
Attendance: 5,000
Referee: Juxhin Xhaja

Egnatia qualified to the final as the team with the higher ranking in the regular season.

=== Third place play-off ===
24 May 2024
20:00

Skënderbeu	3−2	Vllaznia
Nikaj 11'; Liço 16'; Rashica 33'		Mala 42' (pen.); Balaj 81' (pen.)

Arena Kombëtare, Tirana
Referee: Eldorjan Hamiti

=== Final ===
26 May 2024
19:00

Partizani	0–1	Egnatia
		İbrahimoğlu 35'

Arena Kombëtare, Tirana
Attendance: 10,500
Referee: Anthony Taylor (England)

== Relegation play-off ==
19 May 2024
16:00

Laçi	3–1 (a.e.t.)	Flamurtari
Cordeiro 45+4', 109' (pen.); Mjaki 116'		Dajko 63' (o.g.)

Laçi Stadium, Laç
Referee: Erjon Bastari

== Season statistics ==
=== Scoring ===
==== Top scorers ====
As of 24 May 2024

Rank	Player	Club	Goals
1	(Albania) Bekim Balaj	Vllaznia	18
2	(Albania) Kristal Abazaj	Tirana	11
3	(Republic of the Congo) Archange Bintsouka	Partizani	10
3	(Kosovo) Florent Hasani	Tirana	10
5	(Albania) Klejdi Daci	Teuta	9
5	(Albania) Luis Kaçorri	Dinamo City	9
5	(Nigeria) Nnamdi Ahanonu	Skënderbeu	9
5	(Ghana) Raphael Dwamena	Egnatia	9
5	(England) Ronald Sobowale	Laçi	9

=== Hat-tricks ===
Player	Club	Against	Result	Date
(Ghana) Raphael Dwamena	Egnatia	Erzeni	4–3 (H)	13 September 2023
(Republic of the Congo) Archange Bintsouka	Partizani	Kukësi	4–3 (H)	8 October 2023
(Albania) Ildi Gruda	Vllaznia	Skënderbeu	5–0 (H)	22 December 2023

Notes

(H) – Home team
(A) – Away team

=== Discipline ===
==== Player ====
- Most yellow cards: 12
  - (Albania) Albano Aleksi (Egnatia)
  - (Albania) Ardit Krymi (Vllaznia)
  - (Albania) Artan Jazxhi (Teuta)
  - (Albania) Blerim Kotobelli (Teuta)
  - (Albania) Geralb Smajli (Vllaznia)
- Most red cards: 2
  - (Albania) Albano Aleksi (Egnatia)
  - (Senegal) Bakary Goudiaby (Dinamo City)

== Awards ==
=== Annual awards ===
Award	Winner	Club
Manager of the Season	(Albania) Edlir Tetova	Egnatia
Player of the Season	(Albania) Bekim Balaj	Vllaznia
Young Player of the Season	(Albania) Ermir Rashica	Skënderbeu

Team of the Year
Goalkeeper	(Albania) Alen Sherri (Egnatia)			
Defenders	(Albania) Arsid Kruja (Teuta)	(Albania) Renato Malota (Egnatia)	(Kosovo) Arbenit Xhemajli (Egnatia)	(Albania) Edison Ndreca (Egnatia)
Midfielders	(Albania) Arbin Zejnullai (Egnatia)		(Albania) Albano Aleksi (Egnatia)	(Albania) Arinaldo Rrapaj (Partizani)
Forwards	(Kosovo) Baton Zabërgja (Dinamo City)		(Albania) Bekim Balaj (Vllaznia)	(Albania) Ermir Rashica (Skënderbeu)

== See also ==
- Kategoria Superiore

== Notes and references ==
=== Notes ===
1. Dinamo City is playing their 2023–24 home games in various stadiums depending on availability including: Arena Kombëtare, Elbasan Arena and Niko Dovana Stadium.
2. Erzeni will play their 2023–24 home games at the Egnatia Arena in Rrogozhinë, since their venue, Tofik Jashari Stadium, is not suitable for Kategoria Superiore matches.
3. Tirana is playing their 2023–24 home games in various stadiums depending on availability including: Arena Kombëtare, Elbasan Arena and Selman Stërmasi Stadium.
