= 2004–05 KF Laçi season =

Laçi
2004–05 season
- Head coach: Ritvan Kulli (Round 1–2); Hysen Dedja (Round 3–6); Luan Metani (Round 7–27); Sinan Bardhi (Round 27–36)
- Stadium: Laçi Stadium
- Kategoria Superiore: 10th
- Albanian Cup: Third round
- Top goalscorer: League: Erion Selmani (3); All: Erion Selmani (3)
Home colours	Third colours

The 2004–05 was KF Laçi's fourth season competing in the Kategoria Superiore. It covered a period from 1 July 2004 to 30 June 2005. They were relegated back down to Albanian First Division after just one season in the top flight.

== Season overview ==
Laçi set very negative records during its one-season stay at top flight. They did not win any games, and were able to gain only 2 points from 2 draws. They also set the record for the most consecutive losses, 31, and the record most consecutive matches without taking points, also 31. Laçi also changed management four times, starting with Ritvan Kulli, Hysen Dedja, Luan Metani and Sinan Bardhi. They all failed to make an impact. Laçi also become the first team to concede more than 100 goals in one season and the first with less goals in one season, netting only 13. Seven hat-tricks were scored against Laçi during this season, a record in Albanian football.

== Competitions ==
=== Kategoria Superiore ===
==== League table ====
Pos	Team	Pld	W	D	L	GF	GA	GD	Pts	Qualification or relegation
6	Shkumbini	36	14	6	16	49	47	+2	48	
7	Lushnja	36	13	9	14	43	47	−4	48	
8	Partizani	36	13	7	16	59	58	+1	46	
9	Egnatia (R)	36	7	7	22	26	48	−22	28	Relegation to the 2005–06 Kategoria e Parë
10	Laçi (R)	36	0	2	34	13	124	−111	2	Relegation to the 2005–06 Kategoria e Parë

Source: Albanian Football Association (in Albanian), RSSSF.org
Rules for classification: 1) points; 2) points in head-to-head matches; 3) goal difference in head-to-head matches; 4) goals scored in head-to-head matches; 5) total goal difference; 6) total goals scored; 7) draw
(R) Relegated

==== Results summary ====
Overall								Home						Away					
Pld	W	D	L	GF	GA	GD	Pts	W	D	L	GF	GA	GD	W	D	L	GF	GA	GD
36	0	2	34	13	124	−111	2	0	0	18	3	48	−45	0	2	16	10	76	−66

Last updated: 20 May 2005.
Source: Competitive matches

==== Results by round ====
Round	1	2	3	4	5	6	7	8	9	10	11	12	13	14	15	16	17	18	19	20	21	22	23	24	25	26	27	28	29	30	31	32	33	34	35	36
Ground	A	H	A	A	H	A	H	A	H	H	A	H	H	A	H	A	H	A	A	H	A	A	H	A	H	A	H	H	A	H	H	A	H	A	H	A
Result	L	L	L	D	L	L	L	L	L	L	L	L	L	L	L	L	L	L	L	L	L	L	L	L	L	L	L	L	L	L	L	L	L	L	L	D
Position	8	8	9	9	10	10	10	10	10	10	10	10	10	10	10	10	10	10	10	10	10	10	10	10	10	10	10	10	10	10	10	10	10	10	10	10

Source: Competitive matches
A = Away; H = Home; W = Win; D = Draw; L = Loss

==== Matches ====
21 August 2004 1	Elbasani	2–0	Laçi	Peqin
		Report	Guranjaku 19'; Ahmataj 76'	Stadium: Shkumbini Stadium
Note: The match was held at Shkumbini Stadium instead of Elbasani's home ground Ruzhdi Bizhuta Stadium.

28 August 2004 2	Laçi	1–3	Shkumbini Peqin	Shkodër
	Memelli 83'	Report	Rizvanolli 8', 65'; Bardhi 73'	Stadium: Loro Boriçi Stadium
Note: The match was held at Loro Boriçi Stadium instead of Laçi's home ground Laçi Stadium.

10 September 2004 3	Tirana	1–0	Laçi	Tirana
	Halili 5'	Report		Stadium: Selman Stërmasi Stadium

18 September 2004 4	Lushnja	1–1	Laçi	Lushnje
	Lika 68'	Report	Osusi 85'	Stadium: Abdurrahman Roza Haxhiu Stadium

25 September 2004 5	Laçi	0–1	Teuta Durrës	Shkodër
		Report	Xhafa 77'	Stadium: Loro Boriçi Stadium
Note: The match was held at Loro Boriçi Stadium instead of Laçi's home ground Laçi Stadium.

2 October 2004 6	Dinamo Tirana	6–1	Laçi	Tirana
	Gjini 18' (o.g.); Halili 32', 60'; Vera 44'; Doku 55' (o.g.); Pisha 58' (pen.)	Report	Pipa 88'	Stadium: Selman Stërmasi Stadium

17 October 2004 7	Laçi	0–2	Egnatia	Lezhë
		Report	Pashaj 58'; Bespalla 66'	Stadium: Brian Filipi Stadium
Note: The match was held at Brian Filipi Stadium instead of Laçi's home ground Laçi Stadium.

23 October 2004 8	Vllaznia Shkodër	7–0	Laçi	Shkodër
	Zyambo 19'; Salihi 31', 37', 41'; Hoti 48'; Abílio 57', 80'	Report		Stadium: Loro Boriçi Stadium

30 October 2004 9	Laçi	0–4	Partizani Tirana	Lezhë
		Report	Bylykbashi 18' (pen.), 54'; Carioca 45'; Agripino 51'	Stadium: Brian Filipi Stadium
Note: The match was held at Brian Filipi Stadium instead of Laçi's home ground Laçi Stadium.

7 November 2004 10	Laçi	0–1	Elbasani	Lezhë
		Report	Bejzade 21'	Stadium: Brian Filipi Stadium
Note: The match was held at Brian Filipi Stadium instead of Laçi's home ground Laçi Stadium.

13 November 2004 11	Shkumbini Peqin	5–1	Laçi	Peqin
	Ivanaj 49', 51', 65'; Dervishi 60', 77'	Report	Beshiri 40'	Stadium: Shkumbini Stadium

20 November 2004 12	Laçi	0–3	Tirana	Kavajë
		Report	Rraklli 46'; Fortuzi 76'; Agoli 87'	Stadium: Besa Stadium
Note: The match was held at Besa Stadium instead of Laçi's home ground Laçi Stadium.

27 November 2004 13	Laçi	0–1	Lushnja	Lezhë
		Report	Byzhyti 22'	Stadium: Brian Filipi Stadium
Note: The match was held at Brian Filipi Stadium instead of Laçi's home ground Laçi Stadium.

4 December 2004 14	Teuta Durrës	6–1	Laçi	Durrës
	Mançaku 25', 90'; Kapllani 44' (pen.); Babamusta 47'; Beshiri 59' (o.g.); Xhafa 77'	Report	Selmani 75' (pen.)	Stadium: Niko Dovana Stadium

10 December 2004 15	Laçi	0–3	Dinamo Tirana	Kamëz
		Report	Stafa 25'; Xhihani 27', 83'	Stadium: Kamëz Stadium
Note: The match was held at Kamëz Stadium instead of Laçi's home ground Laçi Stadium.

15 December 2004 16	Egnatia	1–0	Laçi	Rrogozhinë
	Rizvanolli 45+2'	Report		Stadium: Egnatia Stadium

18 December 2004 17	Laçi	1–7	Vllaznia Shkodër	Laç
	Selmani 15'	Report	Salihi 24', 52' (pen.), 72'; Samarxhi 35' (o.g.); Lici 54'; Kraja 80'; Sinani 89'	Stadium: Laçi Stadium

22 December 2004 18	Partizani Tirana	4–1	Laçi	Kamëz
	Agripino 24' (pen.); Abilaliaj 55'; Domingues 60'; Allmuça 85'	Report	Gjini 65' (pen.)	Stadium: Kamëz Stadium
Note: The match was held at Kamëz Stadium instead of Partizani's home ground Qemal Stafa Stadium.

15 January 2005 19	Elbasani	7–0	Laçi	Elbasan
	Bejzade 17', 30', 80'; Ahmataj 24', 88'; Dalipi 44'; Guranjaku 67'	Report		Stadium: Ruzhdi Bizhuta Stadium

22 January 2005 20	Laçi	0–2	Shkumbini Peqin	Kamëz
	Memelli 83'	Report	Ivanaj 75'; Bardhi 88'	Stadium: Kamëz Stadium
Note: The match was held at Kamëz Stadium instead of Laçi's home ground Laçi Stadium.

29 January 2005 21	Tirana	6–0	Laçi	Kamëz
	Agolli 3'; Muka 13'; Patushi 52', 70'; Pema 73', 76' (pen.)	Report		Stadium: Kamëz Stadium
Note: The match was held at Kamëz Stadium instead of Tirana's home ground Selman Stërmasi Stadium.

2 February 2005 22	Lushnja	5–0	Laçi	Lushnje
	Arberi 3', 9'; Dalipi 13', 17' (pen.); Sefa 78'	Report		Stadium: Abdurrahman Roza Haxhiu Stadium

11 February 2005 23	Laçi	0–1	Teuta Durrës	Kamëz
		Report	Xhafa 40'	Stadium: Kamëz Stadium
Note: The match was held at Kamëz Stadium instead of Laçi's home ground Laçi Stadium.

18 February 2005 24	Dinamo Tirana	4–0	Laçi	Kamëz
	Diop 30'; Tiko 40'; Qorri 44'; Xhihani 63'	Report		Stadium: Kamëz Stadium
Note: The match was held at Kamëz Stadium instead of Dinamo's home ground Selman Stërmasi Stadium.

25 February 2005 25	Laçi	0–3	Egnatia	Kamëz
		Report	Osmani 23'; Cena 48'; Rrodhja 52'	Stadium: Kamëz Stadium
Note: The match was held at Kamëz Stadium instead of Laçi's home ground Laçi Stadium.

5 March 2005 26	Vllaznia Shkodër	8–0	Laçi	Shkodër
	Sinani 5', 10', 46'; Lici 35'; Teli 37'; Abílio 43', 80'; Belisha 45'	Report		Stadium: Loro Boriçi Stadium

12 March 2005 27	Laçi	0–5	Partizani Tirana	Kamëz
		Report	Bylykbashi 14' (pen.), 30'; Rizvanolli 52'; Muzaka 82'; Ndreka 84'	Stadium: Kamëz Stadium
Note: The match was held at Kamëz Stadium instead of Laçi's home ground Laçi Stadium.

19 March 2005 28	Laçi	0–1	Elbasani	Kamëz
		Report	Osmani 16'	Stadium: Kamëz Stadium
Note: The match was held at Kamëz Stadium instead of Laçi's home ground Laçi Stadium.

2 April 2005 29	Shkumbini Peqin	1–0	Laçi	Peqin
	Xhyra 15'	Report		Stadium: Shkumbini Stadium
Note: The match was held at Niko Dovana Stadium instead of Shkumbini's home ground Shkumbini Stadium.

9 April 2005 30	Laçi	0–5	Tirana	Shijak
		Report	Patushi 30'; Rraklli 50', 73'; Sene 75'; Muka 76' (pen.)	Stadium: Tefik Jashari Stadium
Note: The match was held at Tefik Jashari Stadium instead of Laçi's home ground Laçi Stadium.

16 April 2005 31	Laçi	0–3	Lushnja	Kamëz
		Report	Nora 15' (pen.); Mile 61', 90'	Stadium: Kamëz Stadium
Note: The match was held at Kamëz Stadium instead of Laçi's home ground Laçi Stadium.

23 April 2005 32	Teuta Durrës	5–0	Laçi	Durrës
	Xhafa 11', 40', 55'; Gjondeda 33'; Babamusta 43'	Report		Stadium: Niko Dovana Stadium

30 April 2005 33	Laçi	0–1	Dinamo Tirana	Kamëz
		Report	Gaye 40'	Stadium: Kamëz Stadium
Note: The match was held at Kamëz Stadium instead of Laçi's home ground Laçi Stadium.

7 May 2005 34	Egnatia	2–0	Laçi	Rrogozhinë
	Ceno 49', 55' (pen.)	Report		Stadium: Egnatia Stadium

14 May 2005 35	Laçi	1–2	Vllaznia Shkodër	Kamëz
	Shkurti 55'	Report	Abílio 47' (pen.), 89'	Stadium: Kamëz Stadium
Note: The match was held at Kamëz Stadium instead of Laçi's home ground Laçi Stadium.

20 May 2005 36	Partizani Tirana	5–5	Laçi	Kamëz
	Bylykbashi 14', 20' (pen.), 38', 50', 67'	Report	Biba 18'; Selmani 44'; Peqini 52' (o.g.); Deda 57' (pen.); Kola 70'	Stadium: Kamëz Stadium
Note: The match was held at Kamëz Stadium instead of Partizani's home ground Qemal Stafa Stadium.

=== Albanian Cup ===
==== Second round ====
22 September 2004 First leg	Minatori Rrësheni	1–1	Laçi	Rrëshen
	Tosku 8'	Report	Beqiri 85' (pen.)

29 September 2004 Second leg	Laçi	2–0 (3–1 agg.)	Minatori Rrësheni
		Report
Note: Minati Rrësheni didn't show up in the match and Albanian Football Association decided a walkover 2–0 win for Laçi.

==== Third round ====
20 October 2004 First leg	Elbasani	6–0	Laçi	Elbasan
	Laska 20' (o.g.); Kaçi 26'; Bejzade 30', 40'; Dalipi 66'; Copja 85'	Report		Stadium: Ruzhdi Bizhuta Stadium

27 October 2004 Second leg	Laçi	1–4 (1–10 agg.)	Elbasani	Cërrik
	Gjini 30'	Report	Mehmetaj 10'; Elt. Guranjaku 55'; Elv. Guranjaku 76'; Asllani 78'	Stadium: Nexhip Trungu Stadium
Note: The second leg was held at Nexhip Trungu Stadium instead on Laçi's home ground Laçi Stadium.
