= Borje =

Borje may refer to:

- Börje, Swedish name
- Börje, a parish in the former Ulleråker Hundred of Sweden
- Borje (Foča), village in Bosnia and Herzegovina
- Borje, Zagorje ob Savi, small settlement in Slovenia
- Borje pri Mlinšah, small settlement in Zagorje ob Savi municipality, Slovenia (not to be confused with previous Borje)
- Borje, Croatia, village near Kalnik, Koprivnica-Križevci County, Croatia
- Borje, Albania, village near Shishtavec, Kukës County, Albania
