= FK Kukësi =

Albanian football club

Kukësi
- Full name: Futboll Klub Kukësi
- Founded: 4 March 1930; 96 years ago as Shoqëria Sportive Kosova
- Ground: Kukës Arena
- Capacity: 11.300
- President: Atilio Biba
- Manager: Bledi Kadiu
- League: Kategoria e Parë
- 2025–26: Kategoria e Parë, 10th
- Website: fk-kukesi.al
Home colours	Away colours	Third colours

Futboll Klub Kukësi is an Albanian professional football club based in the city of Kukës. The club plays its home games at the Kukës Arena and currently competes in the Kategoria e Parë, the second highest division of Albanian football. The club played in the lower divisions for most of its history since 1930, before being promoted to the Kategoria Superiore in 2012, where it has won the title once and finished runner-up six times.

== History ==
=== Early years ===
The club was founded on March 4, 1930, in Kukës under the name Shoqëria Sportive Kosova, at a time when football was gaining popularity in Albania. The club initially consisted of young men from Has, Lumë and Gorë, who competed in sports such as athletics and wrestling in addition to football, which quickly became the most popular sport in the city. The club's first match was played on April 20, 1930, against Internati Krumë, which ended in a 0–0 draw. On July 13, the club lost for the first time against Dibra in Peshkopi, in a match that ended 4–1 in favour of the opponent. In August 1931, the club participated in a local tournament, where they played against Kallabaku (Borje), Shkëlzeni (Tropojë), Internati (Krumë) and military teams. With the establishment of the Albanian Football Association in 1932, Shoqëria Sportive Kosova was registered under the name Sport Klub Kosova. However, they did not participate in any of the national championships held at that time. In 1949, after the end of World War II, the Albanian Football Federation resumed its championships. In 1953, Shoqëria Sportive Kosova participated in a national competition for the first time, competing in the regional leagues.

=== Përparimi ===
In 1958, the club was promoted to the Kategoria e Parë for the first time and changed its name to Klubi Sportiv Përparimi. The club's first major trophy came in 1967, when they won the Kategoria e Dytë title and were promoted back to the Kategoria e Parë.

They remained in the league for a decade until 1977, when they won the title, the club's greatest achievement since its founding in 1930 at the time. Despite a quick relegation, the club won the third division again in 1982 and was promoted back to Albania's second division. The late 1970s and early 1980s are considered by many to be the club's golden era.

With the fall of communism in Albania in 1991, the club experienced huge financial problems as they had relied on state funding to run the club for many years. The municipality of Kukës along with local businessmen began to fund the team after the end of Albania's communist regime, but due to the lack of funds, the club did not experience any success for nearly two decades after communism.

=== Kukësi ===
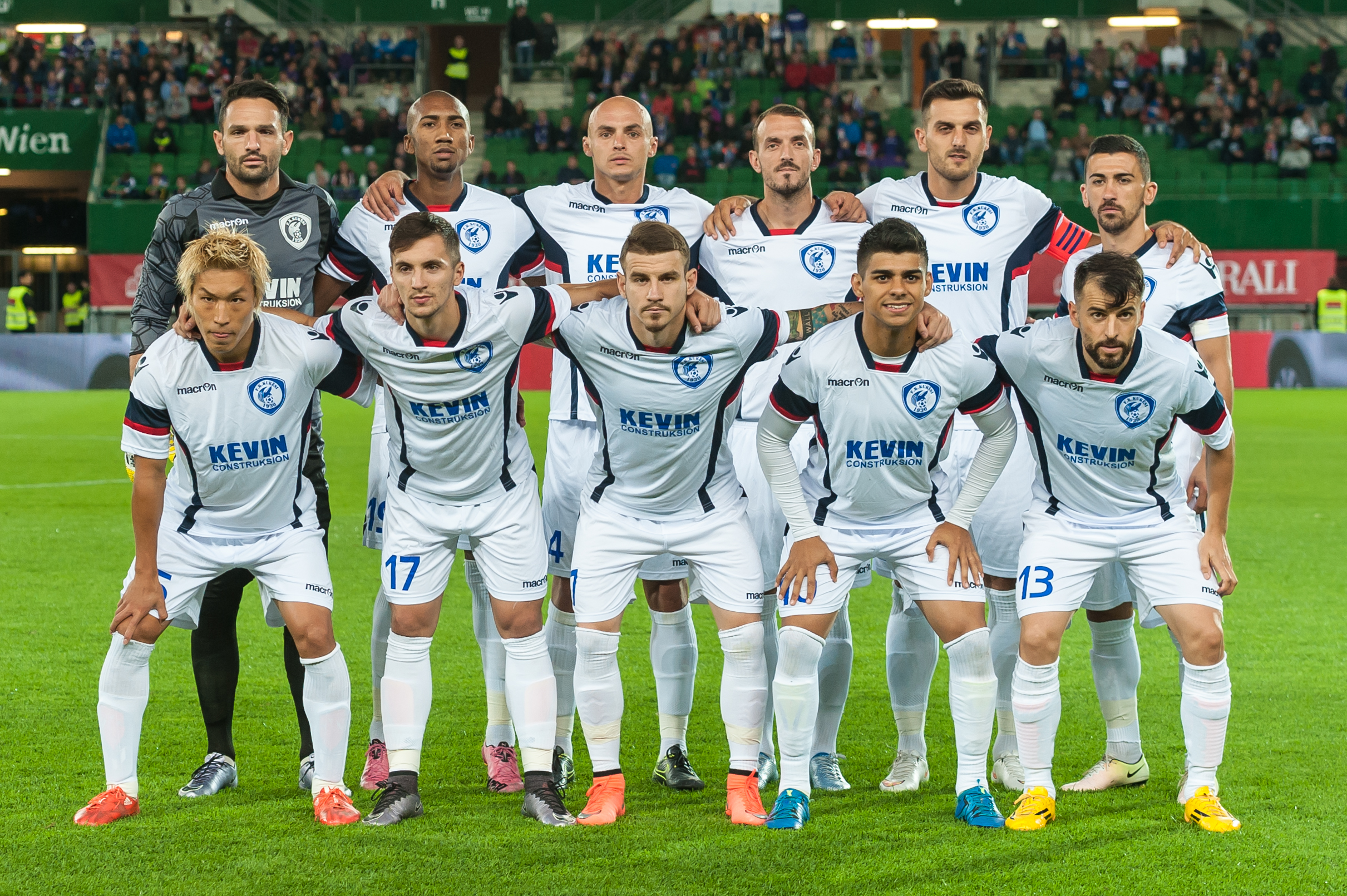
Kukësi in the Europa League in 2016

In 2010, the club underwent a complete overhaul, changing its name for the third time to Futboll Klub Kukësi. The Kukës representative in the Parliament of Albania and member of the Democratic Party of Albania, Fatos Hoxha, was elected president of the club. FK Kukësi aimed to reach the Kategoria Superiore for the first time in its history, and invested heavily for the 2010–11 season in order to achieve promotion from the second division. Fatos Hoxha and the municipality of Kukës hired Shahin Berberi as the club's manager and gave him the financial backing to make many signings in order to achieve promotion. Berberi did just that, and FK Kukësi were crowned champions of the Kategoria e Dytë at the end of the 2010–11 season. The following season, the club once again invested heavily, this time to achieve their goal of playing in the top flight, a goal that was achieved at the end of the 2011–12 season, when FK Kukësi finished second in the table and received automatic promotion to the Kategoria Superiore for the 2012-13 season.

=== Kategoria Superiore ===
2012–13

The club's first top-flight match was against newly promoted Luftëtari Gjirokastër at the Zeqir Ymeri Stadium on August 26, 2012, and ended in a goalless draw in front of just over 2,500 fans. They went unbeaten in their first ten league games, including an away win over Albania's most decorated team, KF Tirana. Their unbeaten start to life in Kategoria Superiore came to an end on November 17 with a 2–0 loss to Flamurtari Vlorë. They finished the season in second place behind Skënderbeu Korçë, whom they defeated 4–3 on the last day of the season. FK Kukësi's season was considered a tremendous success considering the club's modest history, which did not stop them from collecting memorable victories throughout the season, including a 6–1 win over Flamurtari Vlorë and a 5–1 win over Shkumbini Peqin. They were considered the surprise package of UEFA, as they were the only team to finish the season unbeaten at home, and their second-place finish earned them a place in the UEFA Europa League first qualifying round. They finished the season with a record of 15 wins, 7 draws and 4 losses, with 52 points and a positive goal difference of 24.

2013–14

FK Kukësi's first European game was played on 4 July 2013 and it ended in a 1–1 draw away at Estonian side Flora Tallinn, with midfielder Gerhard Progni scoring a 79th-minute equaliser. The return leg was played at the Qemal Stafa Stadium in Tirana and it ended in goalless draw which meant that FK Kukësi progressed to the second qualifying round of the Europa League on the away goal rule. In the next round FK Kukësi met Bosnian side FK Sarajevo, whom they defeated 3–2 at the Qemal Stafa Stadium in the first leg, thanks to goals from Yll Hoxha, Lazar Popović and Igli Allmuça. In the second leg played at the Asim Ferhatović Hase Stadium, the match ended goalless which meant FK Kukësi progressed to the third and final qualifying round of the competition. They faced Metalurh Donetsk from Ukraine in the next round and they shocked the Ukrainians with a 2–0 win in Tirana, courtesy of goals from Lucas Malacarne and Renato Malota. FK Kukësi experienced their first European defeat in their sixth fixture at the hands of Metalurh Donetsk in the away leg of the tie, but still progressed through to the play-off round as they won 2–1 on aggregate over the two games. In the play-offs they were drawn against a far larger club in the shape of Turkish side Trabzonspor, who they faced at home in the first leg which ended in a predictable 2–0 loss. At the Hüseyin Avni Aker Stadium in the second leg FK Kukësi managed to open the scoring through Lazar Popović in the 11th minute, before conceding three times to lose 5–1 on aggregate. The club's European run was widely reported both in Albania and in the region, and the players were considered heroes for overcoming their underdog status both domestically and continentally.

They began the 2013–14 season in poor form, losing their opening game to newly promoted side KF Lushnja before being comprehensively beaten 3–0 at home by Vllaznia Shkodër, leaving them in the relegation zone and second from bottom after two games played. However, they quickly bounced back to beat the reigning champions Skënderbeu Korçë 3–1, before drawing to Teuta Durrës and beating Kastrioti Krujë to lift them out of the relegation zone. They lost their following game against Partizani Tirana which resulted in the head coach Armando Cungu being replaced by Naci Şensoy, whose reign at FK Kukësi began with two draws and a loss that landed the club back in the relegation zone. From week 10 however, they went on a four match winning streak which was ended by a 1–1 draw with Skënderbeu Korçë. However, the head coach Şensoy was under pressure from both the fans and the president Safet Gjici, and after winning just once in his next four league games he resigned immediately after a goalless draw at home against Bylis Ballsh. The club's technical director Sulejman Starova took over as head coach until the end of the season, having last managed in 2010 while he was in charge of KF Tirana. Starova began with a disappointing 2–0 loss to relegation bound Besa Kavajë, before beating Flamurtari Vlorë and KF Laçi consecutively to regain some momentum for a late title push. Hopes of winning the title dampened following a 3–1 defeat by KF Tirana in week 22, despite losing just once in their last eleven games, which saw them win seven times, to finish comfortably in second place, four points behind Skënderbeu Korçë and three points ahead of KF Laçi who finished first and third respectively. They also had a strong Albanian Cup run, as they eliminated Naftëtari Kuçovë, Apolonia Fier, Bylis Ballsh and Teuta Durrës to reach the final with Flamurtari Vlorë which they eventually lost 1–0 to an Arbër Abilaliaj goal.

== Stadium ==
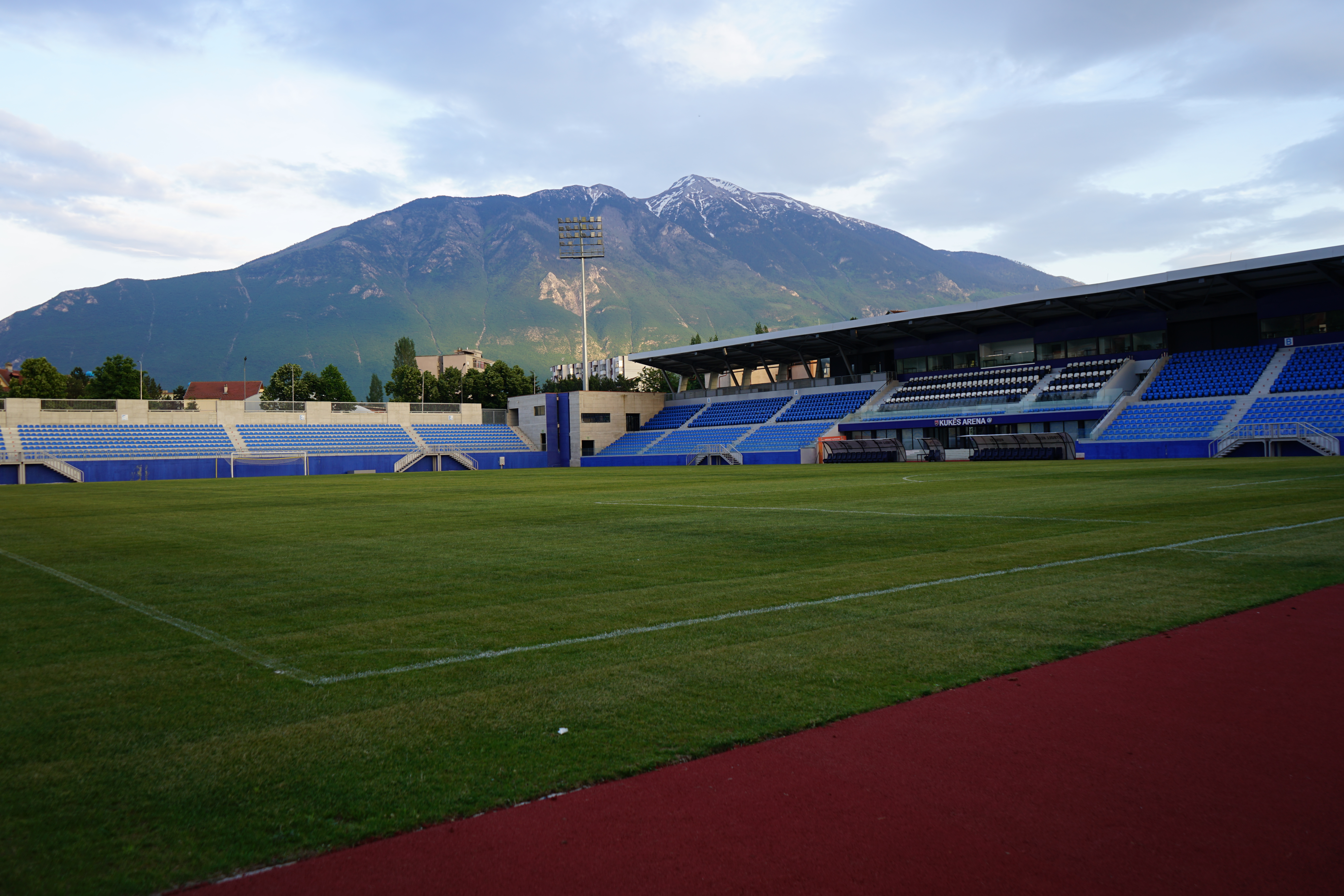
The Kukës Arena in 2023

Kukësi's home venue is the 9,500-seater Zeqir Ymeri Stadium, located near the centre of Kukës. It was completed in 2012. The club had previously played on the field which the stadium was later built over. The previous ground was named the Përparimi Stadium until 2010, after the club's name at the time, Përparimi Kukës. The ground previously consisted of a playing field surrounded by grass where fans would watch games, as the club has spent the vast majority of its history in the lower leagues of Albanian football, thus there was no requirement to build a stadium for a small local club.

In July 2010 work began on the stadium, which was funded jointly by the Albanian Football Association, Municipality of Kukës and UEFA, who invested the €800,000 needed to begin work. The ground was given the name Zeqir Ymeri in honour of a former footballer for the club. The opening of the stadium was on 30 November 2010, where a friendly was played against Partizani Tirana, which FK Kukësi won 1–0.

Once the club achieved promotion to Kategoria Superiore in 2012, the stadium did not meet the requirements needed to compete in the top flight, which led to further investment and an intensive reconstruction program during the summer of 2012 in order to get the stadium ready for the 2012–13 season. The stadium was given a seated capacity of over 9,000 spectators, and all the required amenities were added in order to meet the league requirements. It was reopened on 1 October 2012, with a total reconstruction cost of €1.076,000.

== Supporters ==
Mërgata
- Established: 2013
- Type: Supporters' group
- Club: FK Kukësi
- Motto: Gjithmonë në mbështetje të Kukësit
- Headquarters: Kukës, Albania
- Affiliations: Tifozat Kuq e Zi
- Website: http://www.armataeveriut.al

The club is well supported in the local community of Kukës as well as the surrounding regions in the north-east. The main ultras group is called the Armata e Veriut, which translates to the Army of the North. The supporters are known for some negative behaviour, which included a top of the table clash with Luftëtari Gjirokastër on 6 May 2012 in the Albanian First Division, where the FK Kukësi fans were seen throwing objects onto the field which resulted in the referee Lorenc Jemini having to pause the game. The game eventually restarted, but the club was punished by the Albanian Football Association with a six match stadium ban, meaning they had to play their next six home games behind closed doors. The club was fined a total of €27,000 for the behaviour of its supporters during their Europa League run in the summer of 2013, as they threw bottles and flares onto the field of their home games against Sarajevo and Metalurh Donetsk.

FK Kukësi's main rivalries have been with small local clubs such as Pashtriku Has, which is considered the Kukës country derby, a derby which FK Kukësi has typically dominated. The club's other rivalries are with Korabi Peshkopi and Tërbuni Pukë, which are the north-east derbies. More recently however, the club has seen a rivalry grow with Kategoria Superiore's biggest clubs, which especially includes Skënderbeu Korçë, to whom they finished runners-up in the league in three consecutive seasons: the 2012–13, 2013–14 and 2014–15 campaigns.

== European competitions ==
=== Overview ===
Competition	App	Pld	W	D	L	GF	GA
UEFA Champions League	2	6	1	3	2	3	6
UEFA Europa League	7	26	7	7	12	23	37
Total	9	32	8	10	14	26	43

=== Matches ===
Season	Competition	Round	Club	Home	Away	Aggregate
2013–14	UEFA Europa League	1Q	(Estonia) Flora Tallinn	0–0	1–1	1–1 (a)
2013–14	UEFA Europa League	2Q	(Bosnia and Herzegovina) Sarajevo	3–2	0–0	3–2
2013–14	UEFA Europa League	3Q	(Ukraine) Metalurh Donetsk	2–0	0–1	2–1
2013–14	UEFA Europa League	PO	(Turkey) Trabzonspor	0–2	1–3	1–5
2014–15	UEFA Europa League	1Q	(Kazakhstan) Kairat	0–0	0–1	0–1
2015–16	UEFA Europa League	1Q	(Belarus) Torpedo-BelAZ Zhodino	2–0	0–0	2–0
2015–16	UEFA Europa League	2Q	(Montenegro) Mladost Podgorica	0–1	4–2	4–3
2015–16	UEFA Europa League	3Q	(Poland) Legia Warsaw	0–3 (awarded)	0–1	0–4
2016–17	UEFA Europa League	1Q	(Montenegro) Rudar Pljevlja	1–1	1–0	2–1
2016–17	UEFA Europa League	2Q	Austria Wien	1–4	0–1	1–5
2017–18	UEFA Champions League	2Q	(Moldova) Sheriff Tiraspol	2–1	0–1	2–2 (a)
2018–19	UEFA Champions League	1Q	(Malta) Valletta	0−0	1–1	1–1 (a)
2018–19	UEFA Champions League	2Q	(Azerbaijan) Qarabağ	0−0	0−3	0–3
2018–19	UEFA Europa League	3Q	(Georgia (country)) Torpedo Kutaisi	2−0	2−5	4–5
2019–20	UEFA Europa League	1Q	(Hungary) Debrecen	1−1	0−3	1−4
2020–21	UEFA Europa League	1Q	(Bulgaria) Slavia Sofia	2–1	—N/a	2–1
2020–21	UEFA Europa League	2Q	(Germany) VfL Wolfsburg	0−4	—N/a	0−4

Notes

- 1Q: First qualifying round
- 2Q: Second qualifying round
- 3Q: Third qualifying round
- PO: Play-off round

== Honours ==
=== League titles ===
- Kategoria Superiore
  - Winners (1): 2016–17
- Kategoria e Dytë
  - Winners (4): 1966–67, 1976–77, 1981–82, 2010–11

=== Cups ===
- Albanian Cup
  - Winners (2): 2015–16, 2018–19
- Albanian Supercup
  - Winners (1): 2016
- Independence Cup
  - Winners (1): 2016

== Recent seasons ==
Season	Division	Pos.	Pl.	W	D	L	GS	GA	P	Cup	Europe		Europe		Top Scores
1999–00	Kategoria e Dytë	6/9	16	5	1	10	18	31	16	SR	—	—	—	—	—
2000–01	Kategoria e Dytë	4/9	16	9	2	5	29	24	29	SR	—	—	—	—	—
2001–02	Kategoria e Dytë	9/13	24	9	4	11	28	39	31	FR	—	—	—	—	—
2002–03	Kategoria e Dytë	6/11	20	8	3	9	19	23	27	FR	—	—	—	—	—
2003–04	Kategoria e Dytë	6/10	18	7	2	9	15	21	23	FR	—	—	—	—	—
2004–05	Kategoria e Dytë	7/12	22	6	4	12	27	40	22	FR	—	—	—	—	—
2005–06	Kategoria e Dytë	4/11	19	10	0	9	22	24	30	—	—	—	—	—	—
2006–07	Kategoria e Dytë	5/12	22	11	4	7	29	21	37	SR	—	—	—	—	—
2007–08	Kategoria e Dytë	8/11	20	7	3	10	17	26	24	FR	—	—	—	—	—
2008–09	Kategoria e Dytë	6/12	22	9	3	10	25	26	30	—	—	—	—	—	—
2009–10	Kategoria e Dytë	11/13	24	5	7	12	19	32	22	FR	—	—	—	—	—
2010–11	Kategoria e Dytë	1/14	26	18	6	2	59	22	60	—	—	—	—	—	—
2011–12	Kategoria e Parë	2/16	30	21	4	5	63	24	67	FR	—	—	—	—	—
2012–13	Kategoria Superiore	2/14	26	15	7	4	49	25	52	SF	—	—	—	—	(Serbia) Lazar Popović 16
2013–14	Kategoria Superiore	2/12	33	16	9	8	46	34	57	Final	UEL	PO	—	—	(Albania) Sokol Cikalleshi 17
2014–15	Kategoria Superiore	2/10	36	23	6	7	59	27	75	RU	UEL	1QF	—	—	(Croatia) Pero Pejić 31
2015–16	Kategoria Superiore	3/10	36	18	9	9	41	25	63	W	UEL	3QF	—	—	(North Macedonia) Izair Emini 10
2016–17	Kategoria Superiore	1/10	36	20	15	1	51	18	75	QF	UCL	2QF	—	—	(Croatia) Pero Pejić 28
2017–18	Kategoria Superiore	2/10	36	18	9	9	61	41	63	SF	UEL	2QF	—	—	(Albania) Sindrit Guri 20
2018–19	Kategoria Superiore	2/10	36	17	8	11	42	29	59	W	UCL	2QF	UEL	3QF	(Mozambique) Reginaldo 13
2019–20	Kategoria Superiore	2/10	36	19	9	8	59	31	66	SF	UEL	1QF	—	—	(Albania) Vasil Shkurtaj 22
2020–21	Kategoria Superiore	6/10	36	13	6	17	47	48	45	QF	UEL	2QF	—	—	(North Macedonia) Agim Ibraimi 15 (Nigeria) Patrick Friday Eze 15
2021–22	Kategoria Superiore	4/10	36	15	10	11	50	44	55	SR	—	—	—	—	(Croatia) Edi Baša 10
2022–23	Kategoria Superiore	7/10	36	12	9	15	31	35	45	QF	—	—	—	—	(Kosovo) Gjelbrim Taipi 5 (Brazil) Gabriel Barbosa 5
2023–24	Kategoria Superiore	10/10	36	6	9	21	31	56	27	RU	—	—	—	—	(Albania) Mario Beshiraj 4 (Nigeria) Mustapha Gbolahan 4 (Peru) Sebastian La Torre 4
2024–25	Kategoria e Parë	10/12	33	8	4	21	29	56	28	R16	—	—	—	—	(Albania) Mario Beshiraj 6
2025–26	Kategoria e Parë	10/12	33	8	7	18	31	50	31	R32	—	—	—	—	(Nigeria) Tayo Abiodoun 9
2026–27	Kategoria e Parë										—	—	—	—	

== World & European rankings ==
=== UEFA club coefficient ranking ===
Rank	Team	Points
194	(Albania) FK Kukësi	6.000

== Players ==
=== Current squad ===
As of 22 September 2024

Note: Flags indicate national team as defined under FIFA eligibility rules; some limited exceptions apply. Players may hold more than one non-FIFA nationality.

No.	Pos.	Nation	Player
1	GK	ALB	Amarildo Dervishaj
2	MF	NGR	Daniel Momoh
3	DF	ALB	Endri Murati
4	DF	ALB	Astjon Sulçe
5	DF	ALB	Erest Lamellari (loan from Skënderbeu)
6	MF	NGR	Yusuf Basit
7	FW	NGR	Victor Jaiyeola
8	FW	ALB	Albi Metani
9	MF	ALB	Mario Beshiraj
10	MF	ALB	Françesko Hasaj
11	DF	ALB	Geri Selita
14	FW	ALB	Klevis Hilaj

No.	Pos.	Nation	Player
15	DF	ALB	Xhuljan Kapllanaj
17	FW	CAN	Owen Makouangou
18	DF	ALB	Neshat Murati
20	MF	ALB	Luis Birçaj
21	MF	ALB	Darling Peposhi
22	DF	ALB	Redon Danaj
25	GK	ALB	Enton Nova
46	DF	ALB	Franci Lala
—	DF	ALB	Redon Dragoshi
—	FW	NGR	Abubakar Nasir
—	FW	BEL	Bryan Pica
—	FW	ALB	Kevi Mejdani (loan from Skënderbeu)

=== Out on loan ===
Note: Flags indicate national team as defined under FIFA eligibility rules; some limited exceptions apply. Players may hold more than one non-FIFA nationality.

No.	Pos.	Nation	Player

== Personnel ==
Current technical staff
Position	Name
Head coach	(Albania) Bledi Kadiu
Assistant coach(es)	
Board members
Office	Name
President (administrator)	
Sports director	

== List of managers ==
- (Albania) Shahin Berberi (1 July 2010 - 1 July 2012)
- (Albania) Armando Cungu (1 July 2012 - 2 October 2013)
- (Turkey) Naci Şensoy (3 October 2013 - 10 February 2014)
- (Albania) Sulejman Starova (11 February 2014 - 31 May 2014)
- (Albania) Agim Canaj (2 June 2014 - 20 July 2014)
- (North Macedonia) Artim Šakiri (10 August 2014 - 27 April 2015)
- (Serbia) Miodrag Radanović (28 April 2015 - 14 June 2015)
- (Brazil) Marcello Troisi (15 June 2015 - 23 November 2015)
- (Albania) Klodian Duro (24 November 2015 - 31 May 2016)
- (Albania) Hasan Lika (6 June 2016 -22 July 2016)
- (Albania) Ernest Gjoka (22 July 2016 – 29 July 2017)
- (Serbia) Mladen Milinković (30 July 2017 – 22 December 2017)
- (Austria) Peter Pacult (3 January 2018 - 13 July 2018)
- (Albania) Armando Cungu (13 Jul 2018 - 13 March 2019)
- (Albania) Ramadan Shehu (19 March 2019 - 6 April 2019)
- (Albania) Ernest Gjoka (7 April 2019 - 19 July 2019)
- (Albania) Shpëtim Duro (25 July 2019 - 29 February 2020)
- (Albania) Orges Shehi (2 March 2020 - 30 July 2020)
- (Albania) Skënder Gega (30 July 2020 - 27 December 2020)
- (Albania) Rrahman Hallaçi (28 December 2020 - 25 January 2021)
- (Albania) Mirel Josa (25 January 2021 – 5 June 2021)
- (Italy) Diego Longo (6 June 2021 - 26 May 2022)
- (Albania) Skënder Gega (28 May 2022 - 9 September 2022)
- (Albania) Enkeleid Dobi (9 September 2022 - 11 December 2022)
- (Albania) Rrahman Hallaçi (11 December 2022 - 3 September 2023)
- (Albania) Stavri Nica (4 September 2023 - 30 January 2024)
- (Albania) Emiliano Cela (31 January 2024 - 17 February 2024)
- (Albania) Bledar Devolli (18 February 2024 - 4 June 2024)
- (Albania) Ilir Spahiu (20 July 2024- 9 September 2024)
- (Albania) Emiliano Cela (10 September 2024 - 26 December 2024)
- (Albania) Alfred Allamani (4 January 2025 - 2 March 2025)
- (Albania) Asuel Dervishaj (2 March 2025 - 5 March 2025)
- (Albania) Fatjon Tafaj (6 March 2025 - 25 June 2025)
- (Serbia) Sadat Pajaziti (9 July 2025 - 30 September 2025)
- (Albania) Asuel Dervishaj (1 October 2025 - 6 October 2025)
- (Albania) Bledar Devolli (7 October 2025 - 25 November 2025)
- (Albania) Albi Lika (26 November 2025 -25 January 2026)
- (Albania) Bledi Kadiu (28 January 2026 -)
