= Norbert Grund =

Bohemian painter

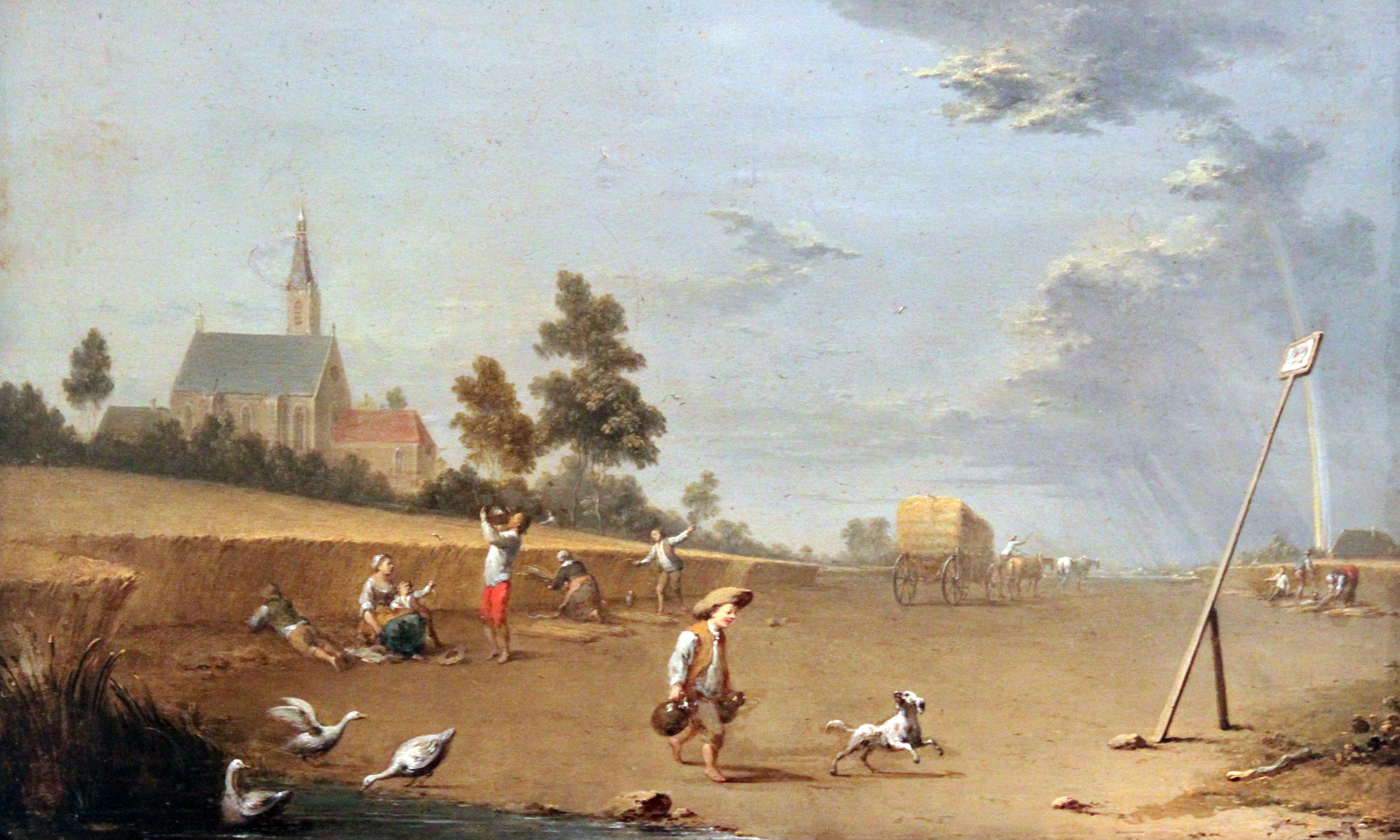
The Harvest by Norbert Grund, Germanisches Nationalmuseum, 1750

Norbert Grund (4 December 1717 – 17 July 1767) was a Bohemian painter who worked in the Rococo style.

Grund was born in Prague. He was trained by his father, Christian Grund, who worked as a court painter in Kolovrat. In 1737, Grund completed his apprenticeship and subsequently traveled to Vienna and Venice. Grund returned to Prague in 1751, and in 1753 he joined the painters' guild of Malá Strana. His works were influenced by concern for the welfare of his extended family. Therefore, he typically painted smaller formats and more marketable subjects. The basis of his works were small cabinet pictures, often genre works, but also landscapes and biblical themed works.
