= Eugent =

Eugent is a given name. Notable people with the name include:

- Eugent Bushpepa (born 1984), Albanian singer, songwriter, and composer
- Eugent Zeka (born 1974), Italian and Albanian football coach

== See also ==
- Eugen
- Nugent (surname)
