= KF Laçi =

Albanian football club

Laçi
- Full name: Klubi i Futbollit Laçi
- Founded: 1960; 66 years ago
- Ground: Laçi Stadium
- Capacity: 2,271
- Owner(s): Pashk Laska (75%); Bashkia Laç (25%)
- President: Pashk Laska
- Manager: Qatip Osmani
- League: Kategoria Superiore
- 2025–26: Kategoria e Parë, 1st (champions)
Home colours	Away colours

Klubi i Futbollit Laçi is an Albanian professional football club based in Laç. The club competes in the Kategoria Superiore, the first tier of Albanian football. Their home ground is Laçi Stadium, which has a seating capacity of 2,271.

Under the ownership of local businessman and club president Pashk Laska, Laçi has established itself as a top-half Kategoria Superiore side since being promoted back to the division in 2009, with their highest-ever finish coming in the 2013–14 Kategoria Superiore season where they finished third. The club have also won the Albanian Cup on two occasions during this period, in 2013 and 2015, they have qualified for the Europa League seven times, reaching the second qualifying round on three occasions, and they have qualified for the Europa Conference League one time, reaching the third qualifying round in 2021.

== History ==
=== Early years ===
The club was founded in 1960 under the name Industriali Laç, and they competed in the Albanian Second Division, the third tier, for the majority of their early years. They reached the championship final of the 1974–75 Second Division, but lost to Vetëtima Himarë and were subsequently not promoted to the First Division. The name was changed to KS Laçi in 1991 when the club first participated in the Kategoria Superiore, the name was changed for the last time to KF Laçi in 1997. The first trophy won by the club was the 2008–09 Albanian First Division.

Altin Cuko is the only Laçi player to have won the Kategoria Superiore Golden Boot while still playing for the club. This was achieved in the 1995–96 season where KF Laçi finished in 12th place, out of 18. Cuko had already scored 5 goals for Tomori Berat before moving to KF Laçi in January 1996, where he netted another 16 times to give him the Golden boot with a total of 21 goals throughout the entire season with both Tomori and Laçi.

=== Kategoria Superiore ===
The club played their first season at the top tier, the Kategoria Superiore, in the 2004–05 season. They relegated back to the First Division after just one season, setting many records along the way. They returned to the Kategoria Superiore in 2009 and brought in new players such as Erjon Vucaj, Arlind Nora, Julian Brahja, Emiliano Çela, Emiliano Veliaj and Ervin Llani. They narrowly lost their first game of the campaign to Skënderbeu Korçë 4–3 and they only won one of their first seven games, which was win against Apolonia Fier. After spending the early stages of the season in the relegation zone, the club hit form and finished in fourth place head of more established clubs such as Flamurtari Vlorë and Vllaznia Shkodër, which also meant they qualified for Europe for the first time in the club's history.

Ahead of the 2010–11 season the club brought in new players in order to build upon their fourth-place finish the previous season as well attempt to go through to the next round of the UEFA Europa League. They were drawn against Belarusian side Dnepr Mogilev in the first qualifying round of the 2010–11 Europa League, and they played their first ever European game on 1 July 2010 at the Niko Dovana Stadium due to the Laçi Stadium not meeting the UEFA criteria to host European games. Bledar Marashi opened the scoring just before half time, scoring the club's first ever goal in a European competition, but his goal was cancelled out in added time as the game ended in a 1–1 draw. However, the second leg proved to be a failure as the club was sent crashing out of the competition following a 7–1 loss, with Valdan Nimani scoring the only goal for the club. Following their exit from Europe, the club brought in players such as Elton Doku, Vangjel Mile and Stipe Buljan ahead of the Kategoria Superiore campaign in order to build upon their fourth-place finish the previous season.

The club defeated FK Kukësi 2–1 in the 2015 Albanian Cup Final to win the Albanian Cup for a second time, meaning they qualified for the 2015–16 UEFA Europa League.

== KF Laçi statistics in Kategoria Superiore ==
Since the Kategoria Superiore began in 1930, KF Laçi have played 675 Superliga matches, scored 733 goals and conceded 839. The club has collected so far 848 points, won 251 games, drawn 153 and lost 271. The club's goal difference is -106 and the winning difference is -106.

Historical	Goals	Wins	Draws	Losses	+/-Goals	+/- Wins	Points	Matches
TOTAL	733–839	251	153	271	-106	-20	675	844

=== Recent seasons ===
Season	Division	Pos.	Pl.	W	D	L	GS	GA	P	Cup	Supercup	Europe		Top scorer
2009–10	Kategoria Superiore	4th	33	14	9	10	35	28	51	SR	—	—	—	(Albania) Arlind Nora 10
2010–11	Kategoria Superiore	4th	33	14	5	14	44	44	47	QF	—	UEL	1Q	(Albania) Vilfor Hysa 13
2011–12	Kategoria Superiore	8th	26	11	7	8	26	28	34	SR	—	—	—	(Albania) Vilfor Hysa 10
2012–13	Kategoria Superiore	7th	26	11	5	10	32	31	38	W	—	—	—	(Albania) Erjon Vuçaj 8
2013–14	Kategoria Superiore	3rd	33	16	6	11	41	28	54	QF	RU	UEL	1Q	(Albania) Erjon Vuçaj 8
2014–15	Kategoria Superiore	5th	36	20	9	6	46	19	69	W	—	UEL	2Q	(Nigeria) Segun Adeniyi 10
2015–16	Kategoria Superiore	7th	36	8	12	16	30	48	36	RU	W	UEL	1Q	(Albania) Valdan Nimani 10
2016–17	Kategoria Superiore	6th	36	10	10	16	23	35	40	QF	—	—	—	(Ghana) Emmanuel Mensah 5
2017–18	Kategoria Superiore	4th	36	16	8	12	45	39	56	RU	—	—	—	(Mozambique) Reginaldo 18
2018–19	Kategoria Superiore	6th	36	12	13	11	33	30	49	QF	—	UEL	2Q	(Albania) Ndriçim Shtubina 10
2019–20	Kategoria Superiore	3rd	36	19	7	10	61	34	69	SR	—	UEL	1Q	(Nigeria) Kyrian Nwabueze 23
2020–21	Kategoria Superiore	4th	36	16	13	7	41	26	61	SF	—	UEL	2Q	(Nigeria) Kyrian Nwabueze 7 (Kosovo) Mentor Mazrekaj 7
2021–22	Kategoria Superiore	2nd	36	18	9	9	52	33	63	RU	—	UCO	3Q	(Mali) Saliou Guindo 19
2022–23	Kategoria Superiore	5th	36	14	6	16	45	46	48	QF	—	UCO	2Q	(Mali) Saliou Guindo 11
2023–24	Kategoria Superiore	8th	36	10	16	10	37	31	46	QF	—	—	—	(England) Ronald Sobowale 9
2024–25	Kategoria Superiore	10th	36	8	13	15	31	37	37	QF	—	—	—	(Brazil) William Cordeiro 9
2026–27	Kategoria Superiore										—	—	—	

== Management ==
The club appointed current manager Stavri Nica on 7 July 2006, ahead of the 2006–07 season in the Albanian First Division. The owner of the club Pashk Laska revealed the new manager at the club's Stadiumi Laçi in front of a considerable number of fans. Nica has guided the club to promotion to the top tier of Albanian football and won the Albanian First Division title in the 2008–09 season. Laçi made their best finish in the Kategoria Superiore in the 2009–10 season; where they finished 4th and qualified for the UEFA Europa League.

== Stadium ==
The club plays its home games at the purpose-built Laçi Stadium located in the centre of Laç, which has an official seated capacity of 2,300, but attendances have reached 4,000 in recent years. The stadium was renovated following the club's promotion to the Kategoria Superiore and further work was carried out when in the summer of 2010 as they qualified for Europe for the first time in their history. Laçi had hoped that they would be able to host their home Europa League at their own stadium, but they were not able to complete the reconstruction in time, meaning their first home European tie against Dnepr Mogilev of Belarus was held at the Niko Dovana Stadium in Durrës. During the reconstruction, the three stands surrounding the playing field were renovated and around 2,300 blue plastic seats were installed to turn the stadium into an all seater. The newly renovated stadium was inaugurated in a home league game against Shkumbini Peqin on 30 August 2010 in front of 1,500 spectators, where Laçi won 2–0. During the summer of 2015 the stadium's turf was replaced for the first time since 2006, and minor cosmetic renovation was carried out throughout the rest of the stadium.

== European competitions record ==
Laçi first qualified for European play after a very good 2009–10 domestic campaign in which they finished 4th to earn a place in the Europa League. The club's first ever European game was played on 1 July 2010 at the Stadiumi Niko Dovana in Durrës. They played Dnepr Mogilev of Belarus in the Europa League 1st qualifying round and their first ever match finished 1–1. Although Laçi had the lesser of the chances and only had 2 goal attempts in the match, they still led for much of the second half through a goal by youngster Bledar Marashi in injury time in the first half. However Dnepro equalised in the 92nd minute through Dmitri Turlin which ruined a dream European debut for Laçi.

Season	Competition	Round	Club	Home	Away	Aggregate
2010–11	UEFA Europa League	1Q	(Belarus) Dnepr Mogilev	1–1	1–7	2–8
2013–14	UEFA Europa League	1Q	(Luxembourg) Differdange 03	0–1	1–2	1–3
2014–15	UEFA Europa League	1Q	(Slovenia) Rudar Velenje	1–1	1–1	2–2 (3–2 p)
2014–15	UEFA Europa League	2Q	(Ukraine) Zorya Luhansk	0–3	1–2	1–5
2015–16	UEFA Europa League	1Q	(Azerbaijan) Inter Baku	1–1	0–0	1–1 (a)
2018–19	UEFA Europa League	1Q	(Cyprus) Anorthosis Famagusta	1−0	1−2	2−2 (a)
2018–19	UEFA Europa League	2Q	(Norway) Molde	0−2	0−3	0−5
2019–20	UEFA Europa League	1Q	(Israel) Hapoel Be'er Sheva	1–1	0−1	1−2
2020–21	UEFA Europa League	1Q	(Azerbaijan) Keşla	0−0 (5–4 p)		
2020–21	UEFA Europa League	2Q	(Israel) Hapoel Be'er Sheva	1−2		
2021–22	UEFA Europa Conference League	1Q	(Montenegro) Podgorica	3−0 (a.e.t.)	0−1	3–1
2021–22	UEFA Europa Conference League	2Q	(Romania) Universitatea Craiova	1−0	0–0	1−0
2021–22	UEFA Europa Conference League	3Q	(Belgium) Anderlecht	0−3	1−2	1−5
2022–23	UEFA Europa Conference League	1Q	(Montenegro) Iskra	0–0	1−0	1–0
2022–23	UEFA Europa Conference League	2Q	(Moldova) Petrocub Hîncești	1−4	0–0	1−4

Notes

- 1Q: First qualifying round
- 2Q: Second qualifying round
- 3Q: Third qualifying round

== Honours ==
- Albanian Cup
  - Winners (2): 2012–13, 2014–15
  - Runners-up (3): 2015–16, 2017–18, 2021–22
- Albanian Supercup
  - Winners (1): 2015
  - Runners-up(1): 2013
- Kategoria Superiore
  - Runners-up (1): 2021–22
- Kategoria e Parë
  - Winners (3): 2003–04, 2008–09, 2025–26
- Kategoria e Dytë
  - Runners-up (1): 1974–75

== Records ==
- Biggest ever home league victory: KF Laçi 7–0 Albpetrol Patos – Sept 27, 1997
- Biggest ever home league defeat: KF Laçi 1–7 Vllaznia Shkodër – 18 Dec 2004
- Biggest ever away league victory: Shkumbini Peqin 2–5 KF Laçi – 11 March 2011
- Biggest ever away league defeat: Skënderbeu Korçë 6–1 KF Laçi – 4 March 2016
- Biggest ever European away defeat: (Belarus) Dnepr Mogilev 7–1 KF Laçi – 8 July 2010

Albanian records from September 1997

== World & European Rankings ==
=== UEFA club coefficient ranking ===
Rank	Team	Points
289	(Republic of Ireland) Dundalk	3.500
290	(Belarus) Shakhtyor	3.500
291	(Albania) KF Laçi	3.500
292	(Luxembourg) CS Fola Esch	3.500
293	(Bulgaria) Cherno More	3.500

== Players ==
=== Current squad ===
As of 1 September 2026

Note: Flags indicate national team as defined under FIFA eligibility rules; some limited exceptions apply. Players may hold more than one non-FIFA nationality.

No.	Pos.	Nation	Player
1	GK	ALB	Ortelio Biba
2	DF	KOS	Fatlind Azizi
4	DF	ALB	Stiven Nikolli
5	DF	ALB	Arlind Kurti (captain)
6	FW	TUR	Eren Yağmur (on loan from Konyaspor)
7	MF	NGR	Oluwarotimi Aderibigbe
8	MF	ALB	Orgi Cena
9	FW	CIV	Lorougnon Doukouo
10	MF	ALB	Olsi Myrta
11	MF	ALB	Hajrulla Tola
14	FW	NGR	Aliyu Muhammad
16	MF	ALB	Stiven Bibo
17	DF	NGR	Emmanuel Samuel
18	FW	ALB	Leonardo Veseli
19	MF	ALB	Klevi Ajazi

No.	Pos.	Nation	Player
21	FW	LBN	Kevin Trad
22	FW	NGR	David Ogah
23	DF	ARG	Gonzalo Gamarra
30	FW	GUI	Amadou Traoré
31	MF	ALB	Henrik Nërguti
32	MF	NGR	Nupe Godstime
33	DF	ALB	Elion Stafa
44	FW	KOS	Jon Latifaj
55	DF	NGR	Eneh Ndubuisi
75	GK	ALB	Gabriel Guri (on loan from Sassuolo)
77	DF	NGR	Harrison Jiakponna
80	MF	ALB	Sandër Kalaj
99	GK	ALB	Eldi Pojana
—	DF	CIV	Eric Konaté (on loan from Konyaspor)

== Records ==
Below is the list with top ten players with most appearances in all competitions for KF Laçi.

Most appearances
		Player	Apps
1	(Croatia)	Stipe Buljan	182
2	(Albania)	Regi Lushkja	181
3	(Albania)	Taulant Sefgjinaj	180
4	(Albania)	Erjon Vuçaj	161
5	(Albania)	Valdan Nimani	153
6	(Albania)	Alfred Zefi	141
7	(Albania)	Saimir Kastrati	139
8	(Albania)	Emiljano Veliaj	114
9	(Albania)	Elton Doku	110
10	(Albania)	Emiliano Çela	108

== List of managers ==
- (Albania) Astrit Maçi (1990–1991)
- (Albania) Mikel Janku (1992–1993)
- (Albania) Luigj Dodaj (1993–1994)
- (Albania) Arben Feshti (1994–1995)
- (Albania) Kujtim Ceka (1996–1997)
- (Albania) Luigj Dodaj (1997–1999)
- (Albania) Luigj Dodaj (2003–2004)
- (Albania) Ritvan Kulli ( – 10 Sep 2004)
- (Albania) Hysen Dedja (10 Sep 2004 – 6 Nov 2004)
- (Albania) Luan Metani (6 Nov 2004 – 3 Apr 2005)
- (Albania) Sinan Bardhi (3 Apr 2005 -)
- (Albania) Stavri Nica (7 Jul 2006 -)
- (Albania) Përparim Daiu (2007–2008)
- (Albania) Ilir Gjyla ( – 21 Sep 2008)
- (Albania) Edi Martini (21 Sep 2008 – Jun 2009)
- (Albania) Stavri Nica (Jul 2009 – Jun 2011)
- (Albania) Nevil Dede (Jul 2011 – 20 Dec 2011)
- (Albania) Përparim Daiu (20 Dec 2011 – 28 Aug 2012)
- (Albania) Stavri Nica (28 Aug 2012 – 26 Sep 2012)
- (Albania) Ylber Zani (26 Sep 2012 – 22 Oct 2012) (caretaker)
- (Albania) Ramadan Shehu (22 Oct 2012 – 1 Jan 2013)
- (Albania) Stavri Nica (1 Jan 2013 – 3 Aug 2014)
- (Albania) Armando Cungu (3 Aug 2014 - 31 Dec 2015)
- (Albania) Stavri Nica (1 Jan 2016 – 27 Mar 2016)
- (Albania) Eugent Zeka (27 Mar 2016 - 13 Apr 2016)
- (Albania) Ramadan Ndreu (13 Apr 2016 - Dec 2016)
- (Brazil) Marcello Troisi (Jul 2016 - Oct 2016)
- (Albania) Bledar Sinella (Jan 2017 - Apr 2017)
- (Albania) Stavri Nica (Apr 2017 – Sep 2017)
- (Albania) Gentian Mezani (Sep 2017 - 6 Jun 2018)
- (Albania) Besnik Prenga (6 Jun 2018 - 7 Aug 2018)
- (Albania) Artan Mërgjyshi (7 Aug 2018 - Oct 2018)
- (Albania) Migen Memelli (Nov 2018 - Dec 2018)
- (Albania) Armando Cungu (Oct 2019 - Nov 2020 )
- (Albania) Stavri Nica (Nov 2020 – Dec 2020)
- (Albania) Klevis Hima (Dec 2020 – Dec 2020) (caretaker)
- (Albania) Shpëtim Duro (Dec 2020 – Aug 2021)
- (Montenegro) Dejan Vukićević (Aug 2021 – 16 Oct 2021)
- (Albania) Sero Noka (17 Oct 2021 – 24 Oct 2021) (caretaker)
- (Albania) Mirel Josa (25 Oct 2021 – 5 Apr 2022)
- (Albania) Shpëtim Duro (7 Apr 2022 – 31 July 2022)
- (Montenegro) Dejan Vukićević (4 Aug 2022 – 17 November 2022)
- (Albania) Gentian Mezani (19 Nov 2022 – 5 Apr 2023)
- (Albania) Stavri Nica (6 Apr 2023 – 28 Aug 2023)
- (Albania) Skerdi Bejzade (29 Aug 2023 – 29 Sep 2023)
- (Albania) Mirel Josa (30 Sep 2023 – 3 Mar 2024)
- (Albania) Armando Cungu (4 Mar 2024 - 28 Sep 2024)
- (Italy) Francesco Passiatore (29 Sep 2024 – 8 Oct 2024) (caretaker)
- (Italy) Francesco Moriero (9 Oct 2024 – 13 Jun 2025)
- (Portugal) Rui Amorim (28 Jun 2025 – 15 Aug 2025)
- (Italy) Stefano Senigagliesi (16 Aug 2025 – 31 Oct 2025)
- (Kosovo) (Turkey) Naci Şensoy (1 Nov 2025 - 17 May 2025)
- (North Macedonia) Qatip Osmani (27 Jun 2026 –)
