= Eugent Zeka =

Italian football coach (born 1974)

Personal information
- Date of birth: 21 February 1974 (age 52)
- Place of birth: Shkodër, Albania
- Position: Midfielder

Senior career*
Years	Team	Apps	(Gls)
1992–1995	KF Studenti		
1995–1996	KF Porto		
1996–1997	KF Shkodra		
1998–1999	US Vecchia Chiavari		
1999–2000	US Riviera Fazzini		
2000–2001	Villaggio Calcio A.s.d.		
2001–2002	Verbania Calcio		
2002–2004	A.S.D. Cambiasca		
2004–2005	U.S. Calvarese 1923		

Managerial career
- 2004–2005: Acquarone Angels (Disability Team Head Coach)
- 2005–2006: Acquarone Angels (Disability Team Head Coach)
- 2006–2007: Sestri Levante (Youth Teams)
- 2007–2008: Sestri Levante (Youth Teams)
- 2008–2009: Sestri Levante (Youth Teams)
- 2009–2010: Virtus Entella (Youth Teams)
- 2010–2011: Virtus Entella (Youth Teams)
- 2011–2012: Sestri Levante (Youth Teams)
- 2014–2015: Il Golfo del Tigullio (Youth Teams)
- 2015–2016: Genoa (Talent Scout)
- 2016: Laçi (Manager)
- 2016-2018: KF Vllaznia (Sporting Director)
- 2018–2020: Real Fieschi (Youth Teams)
- * Club domestic league appearances and goals

Eugent Zeka (born 21 February 1974) is an Italian football coach who was the Sporting Director of KF Vllaznia in the Albanian Superliga.

== Playing career ==
=== Early life ===
Zeka was born in Shkodër in 1974 where he attended Jordan Misja High School. He moved to Tirana where he studied teaching and football coaching at the Vojo Kushi University of Sports and Physical Education between 1992 and 1996, where he was taught by Shyqyri Rreli, Miqo Papadhopulli, Bahri Ishka, Bujar Kasmi, Parid Beliu. and Met Spahija. He returned to his hometown Shkodër after graduating from university, where he worked as a physical education teacher at Oblikë High School for two years before moving to Italy in 1998. During his time in Albania he played as a professional footballer for KF Studenti, KF Porto as well as KF Shkodra in the Albanian First Division between 1992 and 1998.

== Managerial career ==
=== Youth teams ===
Zeka has worked as technical director, head coach, technical assistant and talent scout at various football clubs in Liguria in Italy. Among the most important are Virtus Entella, Genoa CFC, US Sestri Levante and Real Fieschi. Wherever Zeka has worked he has developed and achieved excellent results. Among his most important successes are the Italian championship won as a technical assistant with the U18 team of Virtus Entella, all tournaments won as manager of the Virtus Entella U15 team, and the championship was won after 35 years with the U18 team of the USD Sestri Levante.

=== KF Laçi ===
Zeka became the head coach of Albanian Superliga side KF Laçi on 25 March 2016 following the departure of Stavri Nica. This was his first role as a head coach of a senior professional club in Albania. He guided his side to a goalless draw against title challengers Partizani Tirana in his first game on 2 April, and won 1–0 in his second game in charge against the Albanian champions Skënderbeu Korçë in the first leg of the Albanian Cup semi-finals.

=== KF Vllaznia ===
Zeka was appointed Sporting Director of KF Vllaznia in the Albanian Superliga on 16 September 2016, replacing Armir Grima. He resigned in January 2018.
