= Kal, Kolovrat =

Kal
- Location in Slovenia
- Coordinates: 46°9′40″N 14°51′43″E
- Country: Slovenia
- Traditional region: Upper Carniola
- Statistical region: Central Sava
- Municipality: Zagorje ob Savi
- Elevation: 480 m (1,570 ft)

Kal (pronounced [ˈkaːl]) is a former village in central Slovenia in the Municipality of Zagorje ob Savi. It is now part of the village of Kolovrat. It is part of the traditional region of Upper Carniola and is now included in the Central Sava Statistical Region.

== Geography ==
Kal stands southwest of the village center of Kolovrat, below the south slope of Kal Hill (elevation 682 metres or 2,238 feet).

== Name ==
The name Kal literally means 'pond', based on the common noun kal 'pond, watering hole' and referring to a local geographical feature.

== History ==
Kal was annexed by Kolovrat in 1953, ending its existence as a separate settlement.
