= Borje pri Mlinšah =

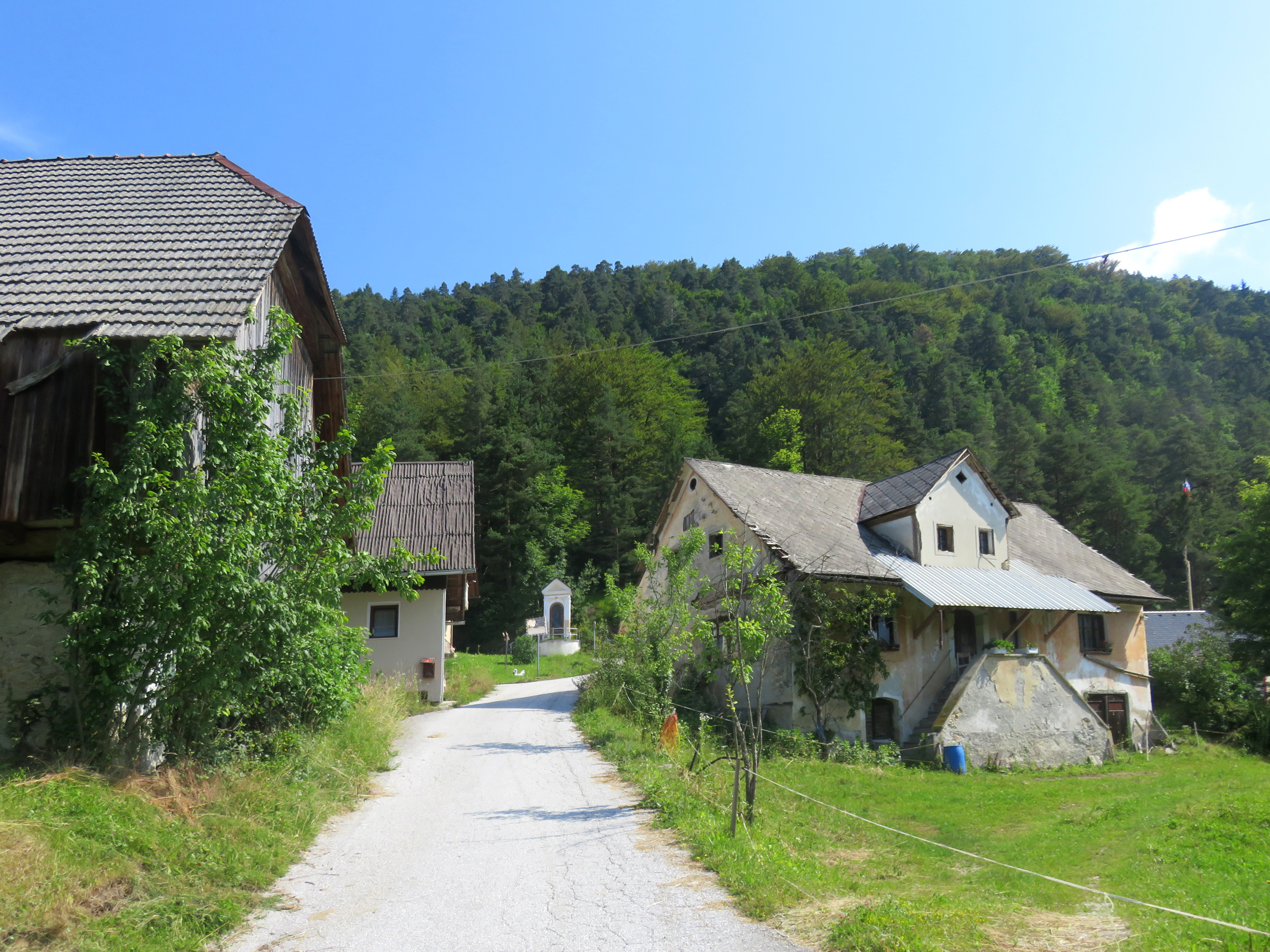

- Location in Slovenia
- Coordinates: 46°10′3.34″N 14°50′0.94″E
- Country: Slovenia
- Traditional region: Upper Carniola
- Statistical region: Central Sava
- Municipality: Zagorje ob Savi

Area
  - Total: 2.68 km^{2} (1.03 sq mi)
- Elevation: 557.6 m (1,829 ft)

Population (2002)
  - Total: 35
- Postal code: 1411

Borje pri Mlinšah (pronounced [ˈbɔːɾjɛ pɾi ˈmliːnʃax]) is a settlement west of Izlake in the Municipality of Zagorje ob Savi in central Slovenia. The area is part of the traditional region of Upper Carniola. It is now included with the rest of the municipality in the Central Sava Statistical Region. The settlement includes the hamlet of Zgornje Vrtače (in older sources also Gorenje Vrtače, German: Oberwertatsche).

== Name ==
Borje pri Mlinšah was attested in written sources as Bore and Woͤry in 1360, and as Worie in 1478. The name of the settlement was changed from Borje to Borje pri Mlinšah in 1955. The name Borje is derived from the Slovene common noun borje 'pine forest' (< bor 'pine'), referring to the local vegetation.

== Church ==
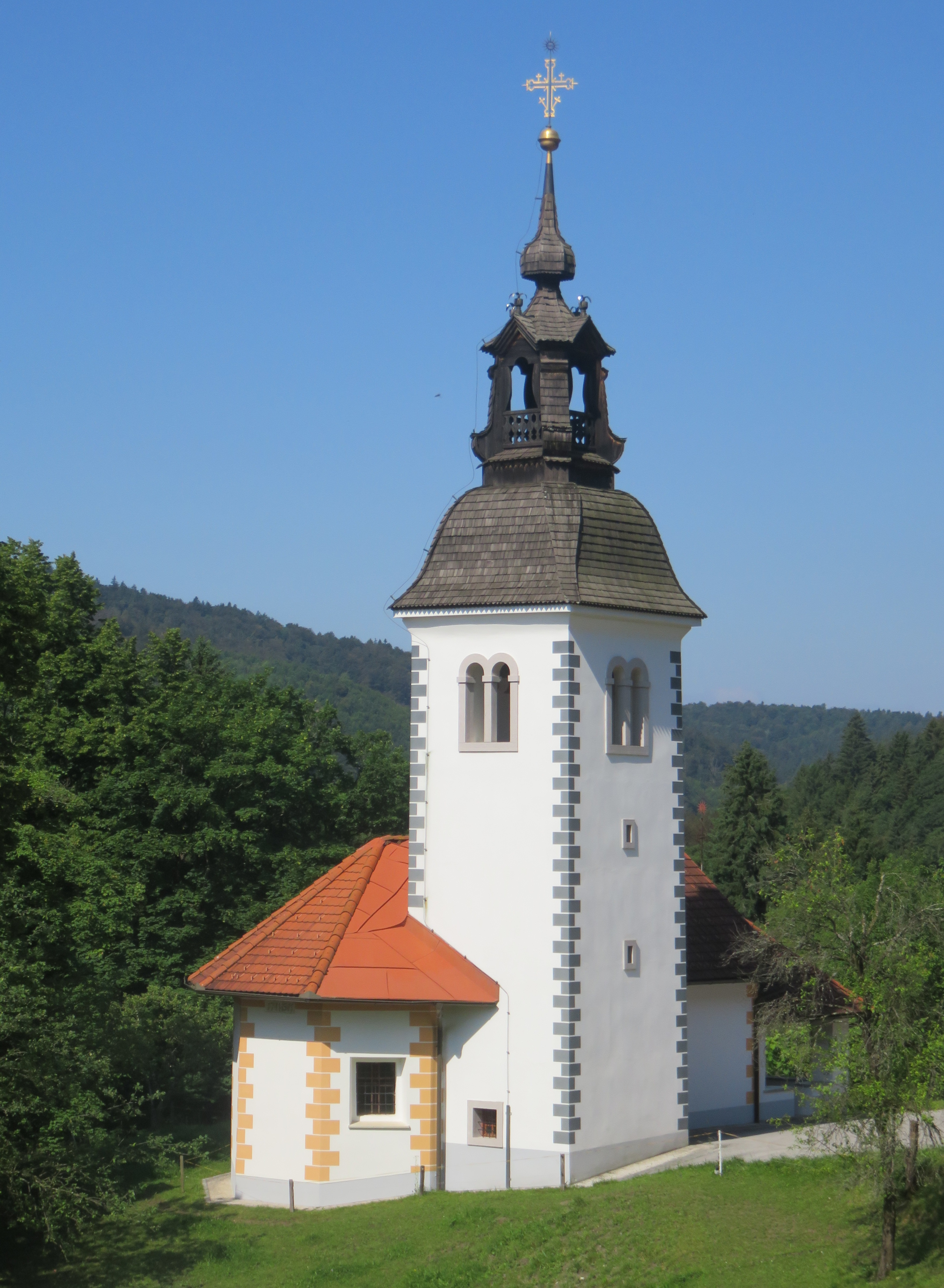
Saint James's Church

The local church is dedicated to Saint James (Slovene: sveti Jakob) and belongs to the Parish of Kolovrat. It dates to the 16th century and was first mentioned in written documents dating to 1523.
