= Kobiljek =

- Location in Slovenia
- Coordinates: 46°7′40″N 14°56′2″E
- Country: Slovenia
- Traditional region: Upper Carniola
- Statistical region: Central Sava
- Municipality: Zagorje ob Savi
- Elevation: 770 m (2,530 ft)

Kobiljek (pronounced [kɔˈbiːljɛk]) is a former village in central Slovenia in the Municipality of Zagorje ob Savi. It is now part of the village of Borje. It is part of the traditional region of Upper Carniola and is now included in the Central Sava Statistical Region.

== Geography ==
Kobiljek lies north of Borje, in a pass between Jablana Peak (Slovene: Jablanški vrh, elevation 902 meters or 2,959 feet) to the east and Pleše Hill (elevation 866 meters or 2,841 feet) to the northwest. Kobiljek Hill (elevation 920 meters or 3,020 feet) rises to the southeast. It is accessible by a road from Jablana.

== Name ==
The name Kobiljek is related to toponyms such as Kobilje and Koble, and it is derived from Slavic *kobyla 'mare'.

== History ==
Kobiljek was annexed by Borje in 1953, ending its existence as a separate settlement.
