= Ronald Sobowale =

English footballer

Personal information
- Date of birth: 19 July 1997 (age 29)
- Place of birth: London, England
- Height: 5 ft 10 in (1.78 m)
- Position: Forward

Team information
- Current team: FC Džiugas
- Number: 90

Youth career
- –2012: Chelsea

Senior career*
| Years | Team | Apps | (Gls) |
| 2016–2017 | Carshalton Athletic | 5 | (1) |
| 2017–2018 | Molesey | 33 | (13) |
| 2018 | Walton Casuals | 8 | (0) |
| 2018–2019 | Herne Bay | 13 | (8) |
| 2019 | Molesey | 2 | (0) |
| 2019–2020 | Whyteleafe | 23 | (17) |
| 2020–2021 | Whitehawk | 6 | (0) |
| 2021–2023 | Malisheva | 50 | (19) |
| 2023–2024 | Laçi | 36 | (9) |
| 2024 | → Malisheva (loan) | 0 | (0) |
| 2024–2025 | Prishtina | 14 | (1) |
| 2025– | FC Džiugas | 41 | (11) |
- * Club domestic league appearances and goals as of 1 September 2026

Ronald Sobowale (born 19 July 1997) is an English professional footballer who plays as a forward for Lithuanian club Džiugas.

== Personal life ==
He is the cousin of Udinese Calcio and Austria defender David Alaba.

== Career statistics ==
In summer 2025 it was announced that Sobowale had signed with Lithuanian Džiugas Telšiai. On 27 July 2025, he mede his debut in A Lyga against Sūduva.

ON 8 August 2025, he scored his first goal in A Lyga against FK Panevėžys.

On 22 December it was officially announced that Sobowale would stay at Džiugas.

== Career statistics ==
As of 1 November 2023

Appearances and goals by club, season and competition
| Club | Season | League | | | National cup | | Continental | | Total | |
| Club | Season | Division | Apps | Goals | Apps | Goals | Apps | Goals | Apps | Goals |
|---|---|---|---|---|---|---|---|---|---|---|
| Carshalton Athletic | 2016–17 | Isthmian League Division One South | 5 | 1 | 0 | 0 | — | | 5 | 1 |
| Molesey | 2016–17 | Isthmian League Division One South | 4 | 4 | 0 | 0 | — | | 4 | 4 |
| Molesey | 2017–18 | Isthmian League South Division | 30 | 8 | 1 | 0 | — | | 31 | 8 |
| Molesey | 2018–19 | Isthmian League South Central Division | 2 | 0 | 0 | 0 | — | | 2 | 0 |
| Molesey | Total | | 36 | 12 | 1 | 0 | 0 | 0 | 37 | 12 |
| Walton Casuals | 2018–19 | Southern Football League Premier Division South | 8 | 0 | 4 | 1 | — | | 12 | 1 |
| Malisheva | 2021–22 | Football Superleague of Kosovo | 23 | 8 | 2 | 1 | — | | 25 | 9 |
| Malisheva | 2022–23 | Football Superleague of Kosovo | 27 | 11 | 2 | 2 | — | | 29 | 13 |
| Malisheva | Total | | 50 | 19 | 4 | 3 | 0 | 0 | 54 | 22 |
| Laçi | 2023–24 | Kategoria Superiore | 10 | 5 | 0 | 0 | — | | 10 | 5 |
| Career total | | | 96 | 2 | 8 | 1 | 0 | 0 | 7 | 0 |
