= Archange Bintsouka =

Congolese footballer

Personal information
- Full name: Archange Dieudonne Bintsouka Koxy
- Date of birth: 25 October 2002 (age 24)
- Place of birth: Brazzaville, Republic of the Congo
- Height: 1.87 m (6 ft 2 in)
- Position: Striker

Team information
- Current team: Flamurtari
- Number: 24

Senior career*
Years	Team	Apps	(Gls)
2020–2021	Kondzo		
2021–2022	Diables Noirs		
2022–2026	Partizani Tirana	77	(16)
2022–2023	→ Drenica (loan)	28	(7)
2026–	Flamurtari	9	(1)

International career^{‡}
2021–	Congo	5	(0)
- * Club domestic league appearances and goals as of 13 May 2026 ‡ National team caps and goals as of 16 January 2025

Archange Dieudonne Bintsouka Koxy (born 25 October 2002) is a Congolese professional footballer who plays as a striker for Albanian club Flamurtari and the Congo national team.

== Club career ==
Bintsouka played for AS Kondzo of the Congo Premier League. On 1 February 2022, it was revealed that Albanian Kategoria Superiore club Partizani Tirana were finalizing a contract with Bintsouka ahead of the close of the transfer window in Europe.

In August 2022, it was announced Partizani had agreed to a one-year loan for Bintsouka with Kosovo Superleague club Drenica. He scored his first league goal for the club on 27 August 2022 in a 2–1 victory over KF Malisheva.

== International career ==
Bintsouka made his competitive international debut on 21 January 2021 in a 2020 African Nations Championship match against Niger. He went on to make three total appearances in the tournament. Prior to the tournament, he appeared for the Congo in two warmup friendlies against Rwanda on 7 and 10 January.

=== International statistics ===
As of match played 19 November 2024

Congo national team
Year	Apps	Goals
2021	3	0
2024	2	0
Total	5	0
