= Pashk Laska =

Albanian football administrator

- Born: Pashk Laska; Laç, Albania
- Occupation: Businessman
- Known for: President of KF Laçi

Pashk Laska is the majority shareholder and president of Albanian football club KF Laçi.

== KF Laçi ==
Laska has been the president of KF Laçi since 2002. Under his guidance, the club has won the Albanian Cup and Albanian First Division twice each as well as the Albanian Supercup. On 13 May 2011, the club was officially registered as a Joint Stock Company (SH.A) and an initial capital of 3,500,000 Albanian lek, with Laska owning 75% of the shares and the Municipality of Laç owning the remaining 25%.
