= Armando Cungu =

Albanian footballer and coach

Personal information
- Date of birth: 23 April 1973 (age 53)
- Place of birth: Shkodër, PR Albania
- Position: Midfielder

Senior career*
Years	Team	Apps	(Gls)
1993–1998	Vllaznia		
1998	Ethnikos		
1999–2000	Vllaznia		
2000–2001	Luftëtari		
2001–2002	Teuta		
2002	Vllaznia	7	(5)
2003–2004	Vllaznia	28	(0)
2004–2005	Flamurtari Prishtina		(2)

Managerial career
- 2006: Ada
- 2010–2012: Vllaznia (sporting director)
- 2012–2013: Kukësi
- 2014–2015: Laçi
- 2016–2017: Vllaznia
- 2018–2019: Kukësi
- 2019–2020: Laçi
- 2021–2023: Albania U-19
- 2024: Laçi
- * Club domestic league appearances and goals

Armando Cungu (born 23 April 1973) is an Albanian football coach and former player.

== Managerial career ==
=== Laçi ===
Cungu started his second season in charge of Laçi in July, where the team was going to face Inter Baku for the 2015–16 UEFA Europa League first qualifying round. In the first leg at home, despite making a good overall appearance in the match, Laçi didn't earn more than a 1–1 draw, leaving everything open for the returning leg. In the returning leg, Cungu's side was not able to score as the final result was 0–0, meaning that Laçi are out due to away goal rule. On 12 August, in team's first match in domestic season, Cungu won his second silverware with the club, the Albanian Supercup, where Laçi beat Skënderbeu Korçë on penalty shootouts after a 2–2 draw in regular time.

On 31 December 2015, Cungu resigned as Laçi coach following the poor results lately.

=== Vllaznia Shkodër ===
On 8 January 2016, Cungu was appointed the new coach of Vllaznia Shkodër, replacing Armir Grimaj for the second part of 2015–16 season. He was presented to the media the following day, where he signed is 18-month contract.

== Managerial statistics ==
As of 28 April 2016

Team	From	To	Record					
Team	From	To	G	W	D	L	Win %	Ref.
Kukësi	July 2012	2 October 2013	52	25	12	15	48.08	
Laçi	3 August 2014	31 December 2015	80	36	21	23	45.00	
Vllaznia Shkodër	9 January 2016	Present	15	5	3	7	33.33	
Total			147	66	36	45	44.90	

== Honours ==
=== Manager ===
Laçi

- Albanian Cup (1): 2014–15
- Albanian Supercup (1): 2015

=== Player ===
Vllaznia

- Albanian League (1): 1997–98
