= Elton Çeno =

Albanian footballer

Personal information
- Full name: Elton Çeno
- Date of birth: 19 June 1976 (age 50)
- Place of birth: Albania
- Position: Midfielder

Senior career*
Years	Team	Apps	(Gls)
1994–1998	Elbasani	48	(5)
1998	Shkumbini	7	(7)
1999	Steaua Bucharest	5	(0)
2000	Teuta	6	(0)
2000–2003	Shkumbini	38	(8)
2004–2005	Egnatia	22	(6)
2005–2006	Lushnja	20	(4)
2006–2007	Elbasani	7	(0)
2009–2010	Gramshi		
Total		153	(30)
- * Club domestic league appearances and goals

Elton Çeno (born 19 June 1976) is an Albanian retired football player.
