= Brian Filipi Stadium =

Sports venue in Lezhë, Albania

Coordinates: 41°46′33.80″N 19°38′40.78″E

- Besëlidhja Stadium
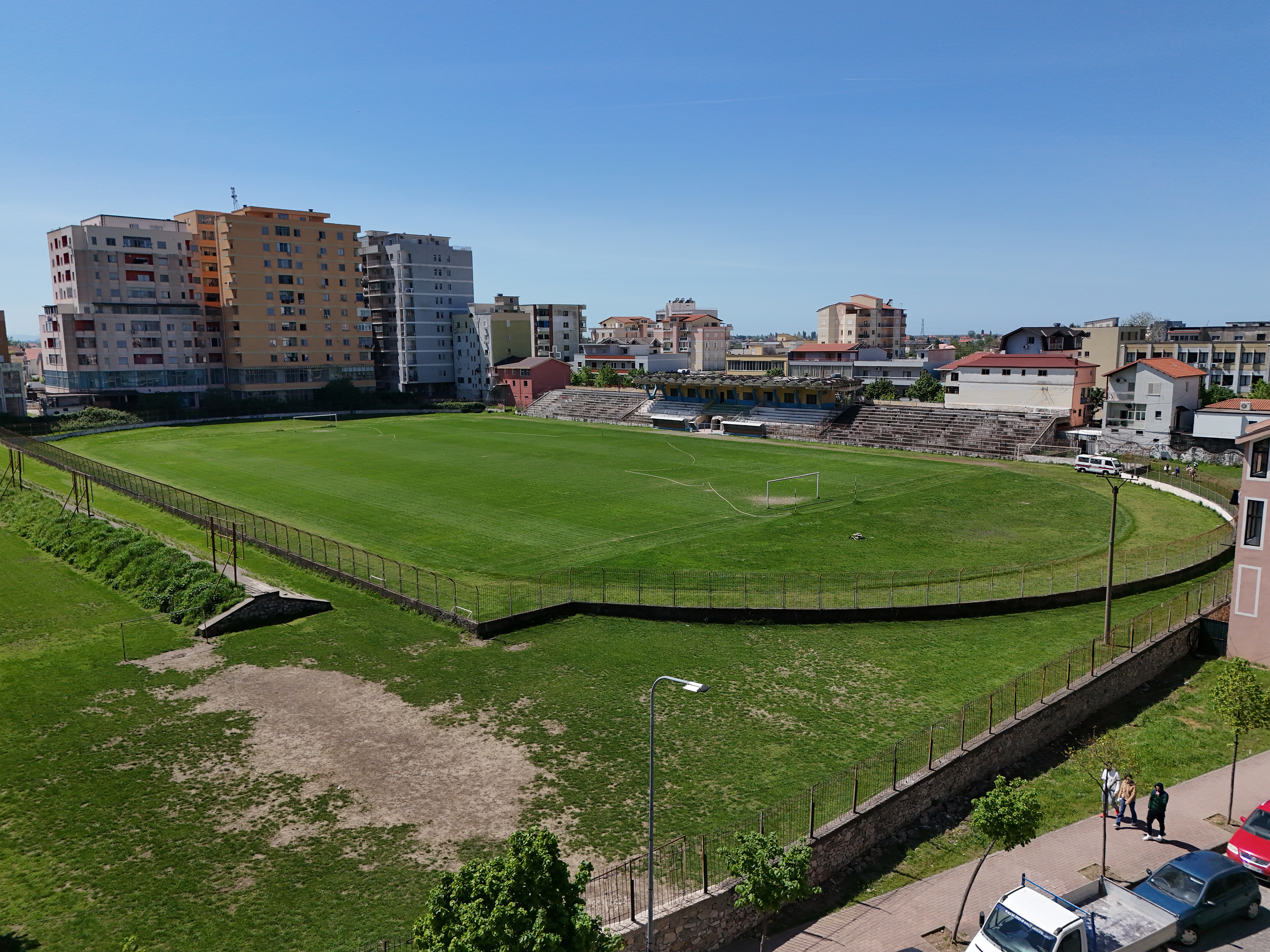
- Interactive map of Brian Filipi Stadium
- Location: Lezhë, Albania
- Owner: Besëlidhja Lezhë
- Capacity: 5,000
- Surface: Grass

Tenant
- Besëlidhja Lezhë

Brian Filipi Stadium (Albanian: Stadiumi Brian Filipi), a.k.a. former Besëlidhja Stadium (Albanian: Stadiumi Besëlidhja) is a multi-use stadium in Lezhë, Albania. It is currently used mostly for football matches and is the home ground of KS Besëlidhja Lezhë. The stadium holds 5,000 people.

The football team of Lezha was created in 1930 under the name "Bardhyl" under the leadership of coach Luigi Shala. The stadium began construction in 1969, without a central grandstand and in 1989, the central tribune was built with a capacity of 2000 foremen, which it still has today. The full capacity of the stadium is 5000 people. In 1968 the 500th anniversary of the Assembly of Lezha and eventually the team was named "Beselidhja", name which it bears even today.
