= Borje, Zagorje ob Savi =

Borje
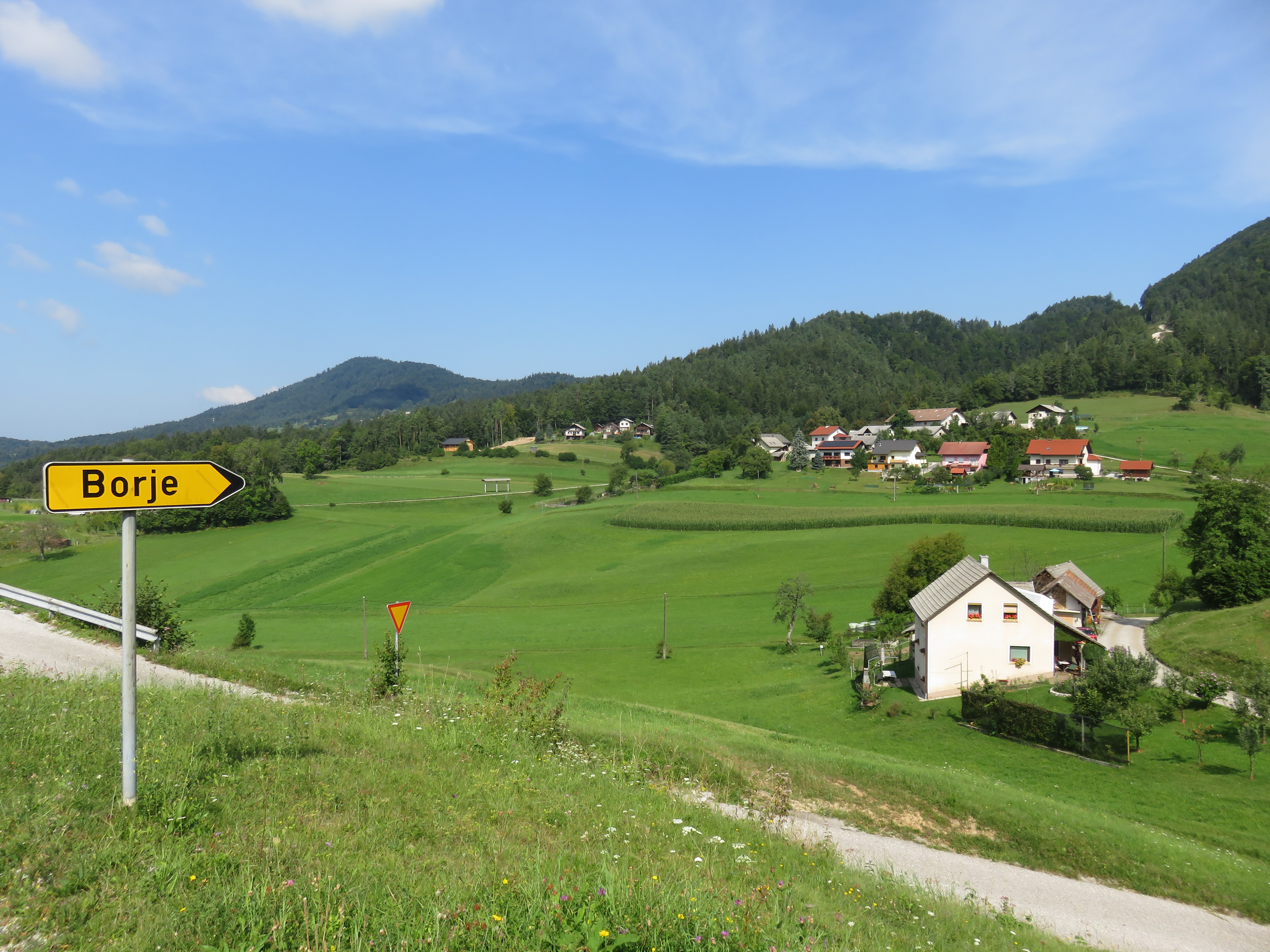

- Location in Slovenia
- Coordinates: 46°6′54.87″N 14°56′23.42″E
- Country: Slovenia
- Traditional region: Upper Carniola
- Statistical region: Central Sava
- Municipality: Zagorje ob Savi

Area
  - Total: 2.62 km^{2} (1.01 sq mi)
- Elevation: 620.4 m (2,035 ft)

Population (2002)
  - Total: 36
- Postal code: 1410

Borje (pronounced [bɔˈɾjɛ]) is a small settlement north of Šentlambert in the Municipality of Zagorje ob Savi in central Slovenia. The area is part of the traditional region of Upper Carniola. It is now included with the rest of the municipality in the Central Sava Statistical Region. It includes the hamlet of Kobiljek to the north.

== Name ==
Borje was attested in written sources as Wari in 1392, Bory in 1468, and Tworiach in 1496, among other spellings.
