= Oscar Luis Vera =

Argentine footballer

Personal information
- Date of birth: 11 May 1976 (age 50)
- Place of birth: Santa Fe, Argentina
- Height: 1.83 m (6 ft 0 in)
- Position: Defender

Senior career*
Years	Team	Apps	(Gls)
1997–2002	Unión	44	(3)
2002–2003	Widzew Łódź	0	(0)
2004	Puerto Montt	4	(0)
2004	Dinamo Tirana	7	(1)
2004–2005	Sarmiento	8	(0)
2005–2006	Gimnasia (CDU)	16	(1)
2007–2008	Real Potosí		
- * Club domestic league appearances and goals

Oscar Luis Vera (born 11 May 1976) is an Argentine former professional footballer who played as a defender. Born in Santa Fe, Argentina, Vera had a career spanning clubs in South America and Europe

== Career Overview ==
Vera began his professional career with Unión de Santa Fe in 1997, making 44 appearances and scoring 3 goals over five seasons.

In 2002, he transferred to Widzew Łódź in Poland, although he did not make any league appearances during his time there.

He later returned to Argentina and played for clubs including Club Atlético Sarmiento and Gimnasia (CDU).
