= Qatip Osmani =

Macedonian football manager (born 1969)

Personal information
- Date of birth: 29 June 1969 (age 57)
- Place of birth: Sisak, SR Croatia, SFR Yugoslavia
- Height: 1.68 m (5 ft 6 in)

Senior career*
Years	Team	Apps	(Gls)
1992–1999	Shkëndija		

Managerial career
- 2010–2011: Shkëndija
- 2012: Shkëndija
- 2012–2017: Renova
- 2017–2019: Shkëndija
- 2019–2020: Shkupi
- 2020–2022: Renova
- 2022–2023: Shkëndija
- 2023–2024: Vllaznia
- 2024–2025: Struga
- 2025: Malisheva
- 2026–: Laçi
- * Club domestic league appearances and goals

Qatip Osmani (born 29 June 1969) is a Croatian-born Macedonian football manager and former player who manages Malisheva. Osmani is widely recognized for his significant contributions to various clubs in the Macedonian First Football League. Throughout his managerial career, he has led several notable teams, including Vllaznia, Shkëndija, Renova, Shkupi, and Struga.

Osmani has gained widespread recognition for his tactical expertise and leadership, particularly during his tenure at Shkëndija, where he secured three Macedonian First League titles.

== Career ==
Osmani began his managerial career in the early 2010s, with a notable early stint at Shkëndija. During his first period at the club, he guided the team to its first-ever Macedonian First League title in the 2010–11 season, marking a significant achievement in the club’s history. His ability to build cohesive and disciplined teams quickly gained attention. He resigned from the team in 2011.

His second and most successful spell at Shkëndija came between 2017 and 2019, where he led the team to back-to-back league championships in the 2017–18 and 2017–18 seasons. Under his management, Shkëndija became one of the dominant teams in the league, known for its strong defensive structure and dynamic attack. He has been regarded as one of the club's most prominent managers. Throughout his career, Osmani has also managed other Macedonian clubs such as Renova, Shkupi where he continued to develop his managerial skills.

On 3 October 2023 Osmani was appointed manager of the Albanian side Vllaznia. Despite his efforts to turn the team around, he was sacked on 25 April 2024. During his time at the club, he was described as having "managed to get a team that he found unmotivated and without points back on track," showcasing his ability to motivate and revitalize struggling teams, even under challenging circumstances. On 29 May 2024, Osmani was appointed as the manager of Struga, the back-to-back league title winners, marking the next chapter in his managerial career.

== Personal life ==
Osmani was born in Sisak, Socialist Croatia to Albanian parents from Tetovo, Socialist Macedonia.

== Managerial statistics ==
As of match played 25 October 2025

Team	From	To	Record				
Team	From	To	G	W	D	L	Win %
Shkëndija	6 November 2010	15 September 2011	15	11	0	4	73.33
Shkëndija	21 March 2012	31 July 2012	16	8	4	4	50.00
Renova	15 August 2012	1 June 2017	168	61	50	57	36.31
Shkëndija	2 June 2017	10 September 2019	96	60	15	21	62.50
Shkupi	23 September 2019	2 March 2020	14	4	4	6	28.57
Renova	27 November 2020	30 June 2022	55	19	20	16	34.55
Shkëndija	15 September 2022	31 May 2023	24	13	7	4	54.17
Vllaznia	31 October 2023	25 April 2024	27	13	8	6	48.15
Struga	29 May 2024	23 February 2025	26	12	5	9	46.15
Malisheva	30 July 2025	Present	9	4	1	4	44.44
Total			450	205	114	131	45.56

== Honours ==
=== Manager ===
Shkëndija

- Macedonian First League: 2010–11, 2017–18, 2018–19
- Macedonian Cup: 2017–18
- Macedonian Supercup: 2011
