= Stavri Nica =

Albanian football coach (born 1954)

Personal information
- Date of birth: 8 July 1954 (age 72)
- Place of birth: Durrës, PR Albania

Managerial career
- Years: Team
- 2001: Shkumbini
- 2004: Teuta
- 2005: Teuta
- 2006: Teuta
- 2007: Besëlidhja
- 2009–2011: Laçi
- 2011–2012: Apolonia
- 2012: Laçi
- 2013–2014: Laçi
- 2014: Luzi 2008
- 2014-2015: Mamurrasi
- 2015: Erzeni
- 2016: Laçi
- 2016: Besëlidhja
- 2017: Laçi
- 2017: Bylis
- 2017-2018: Teuta
- 2018: Burreli
- 2018: Kastrioti
- 2019: Devolli
- 2020: Erzeni
- 2020–2023: Laçi U19
- 2020: Laçi (Caretaker Manager)
- 2023: Laçi
- 2023–2024: Kukësi
- 2024: Shkumbini
- 2024–: Kastrioti

Stavri Nica (born 8 July 1954) is an Albanian football coach.

== Managerial career ==
Nica replaced Elvis Plori as manager of Kastrioti in October 2018. After winning promotion with Devolli to the Albanian First Division in summer 2019, Nica was replaced by Festim Fetollari in November 2019.
