= Kolovrat, Zagorje ob Savi =

Kolovrat
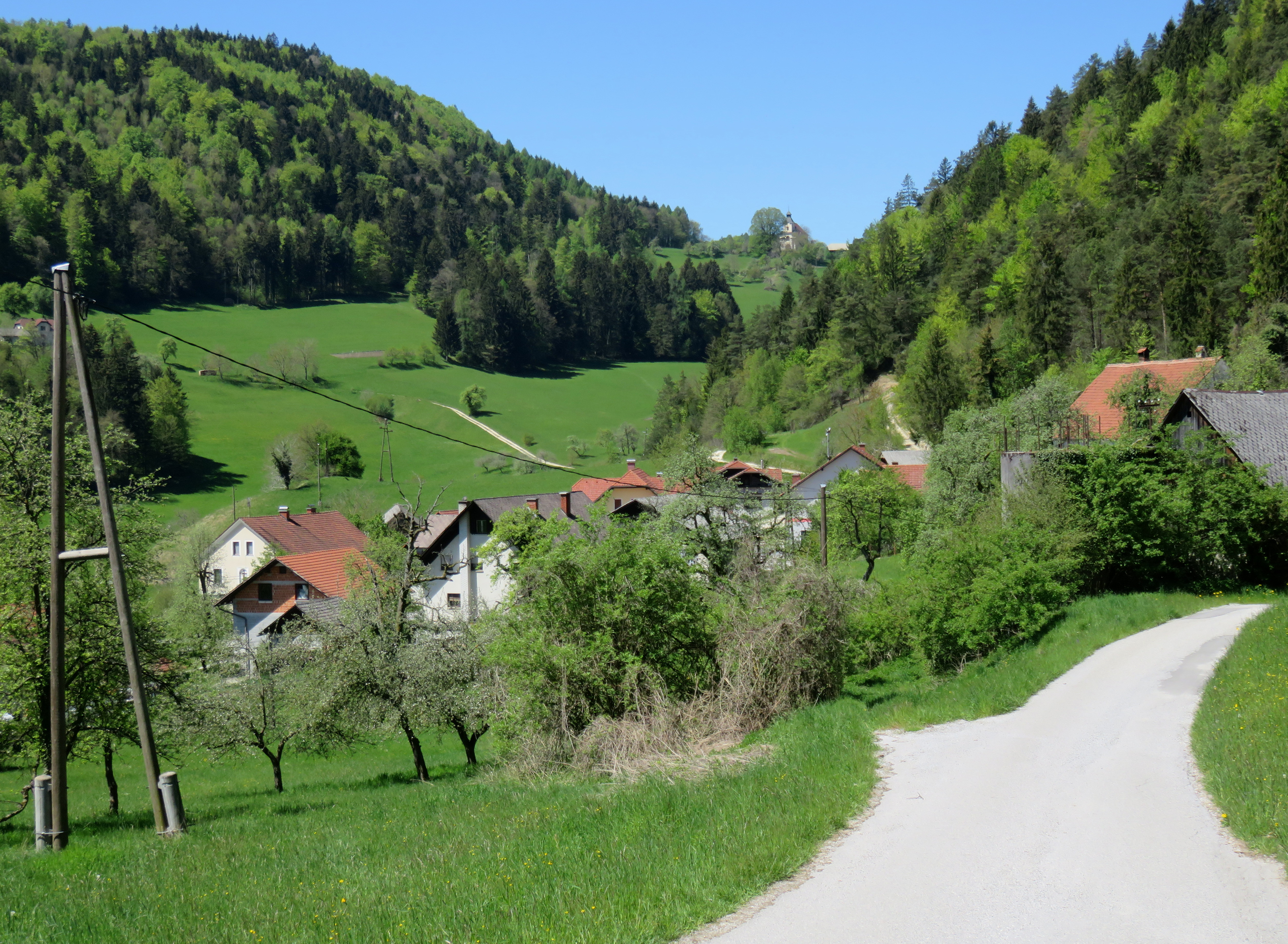

- Location in Slovenia
- Coordinates: 46°10′8.05″N 14°52′23.12″E
- Country: Slovenia
- Traditional region: Upper Carniola
- Statistical region: Central Sava
- Municipality: Zagorje ob Savi

Area
  - Total: 6.22 km^{2} (2.40 sq mi)
- Elevation: 463.9 m (1,522 ft)

Population (2002)
  - Total: 141
- Postal code: 1411

Kolovrat (pronounced [kɔlɔˈwɾaːt] or [kɔˈloːwɾat]; German: Kolowrat) is a settlement in the Municipality of Zagorje ob Savi in central Slovenia. The area is part of the traditional region of Upper Carniola. It is now included with the rest of the municipality in the Central Sava Statistical Region. The settlement includes the hamlets of Kal, Plavišnik, Prevalje, Spodnje Vrtače (German: Unterwertatsche), Senčna Vas (Slovene: Senčna vas), and Strma Njiva.

== Name ==
The name Kolovrat is originally an oronym that appears several times in Slovenia (e.g., the Kolovrat Range); in this case, it applies to the Kolovrat Ridge (Slovene: Kolovraška reber) north of the settlement. The name Kolovrat is believed to derive from the Slovene common noun kolovrat 'spinning wheel', which developed the metaphorical meaning 'mountain ridge'. In the past the German name was Kolowrat.

== Church ==
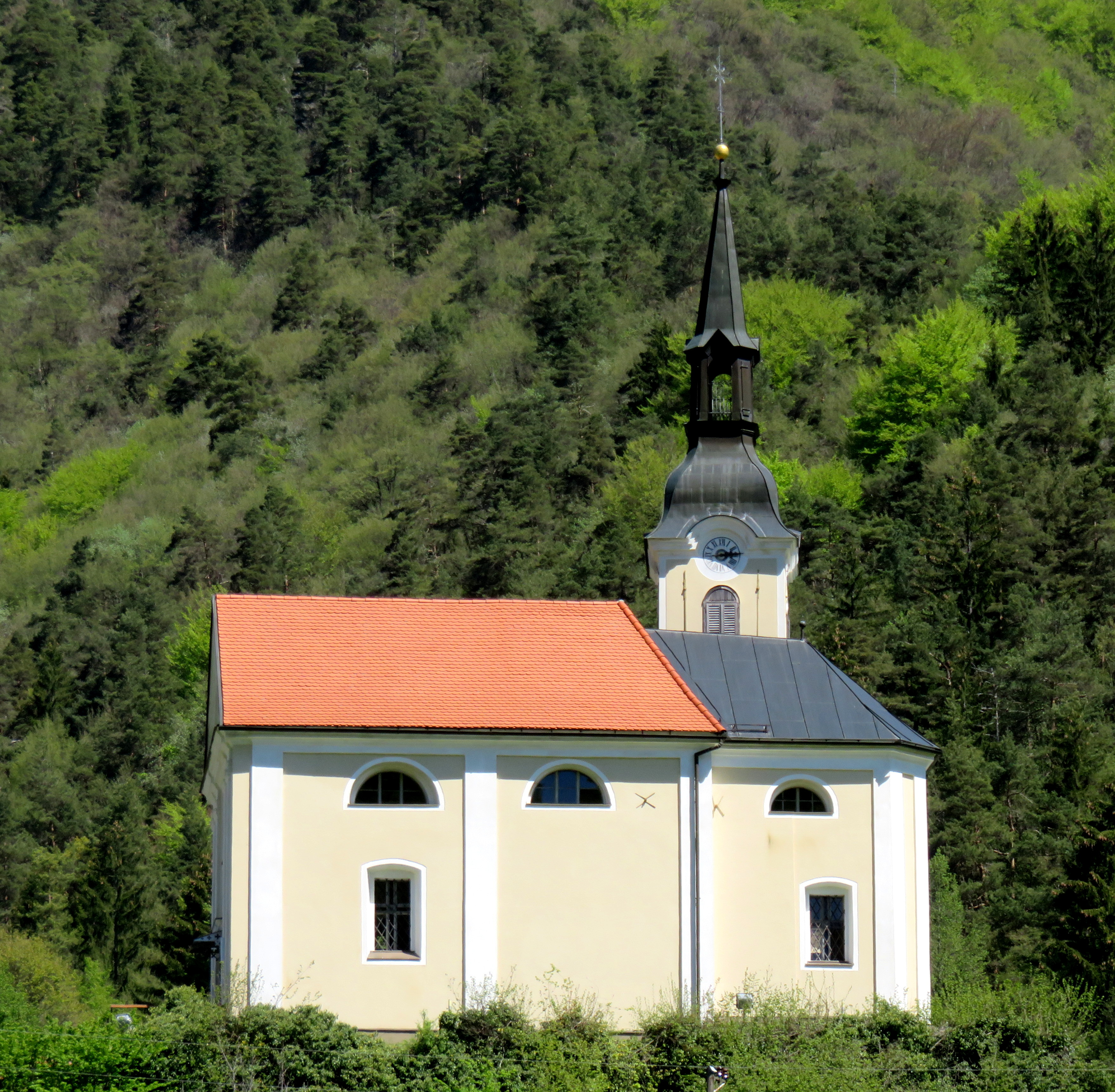
Saint Lawrence's Church

The parish church in the settlement is dedicated to Saint Lawrence and belongs to the Roman Catholic Archdiocese of Ljubljana. It is a Gothic building that was restyled in the Baroque in the late 18th century.

== Kolovrat Castle ==
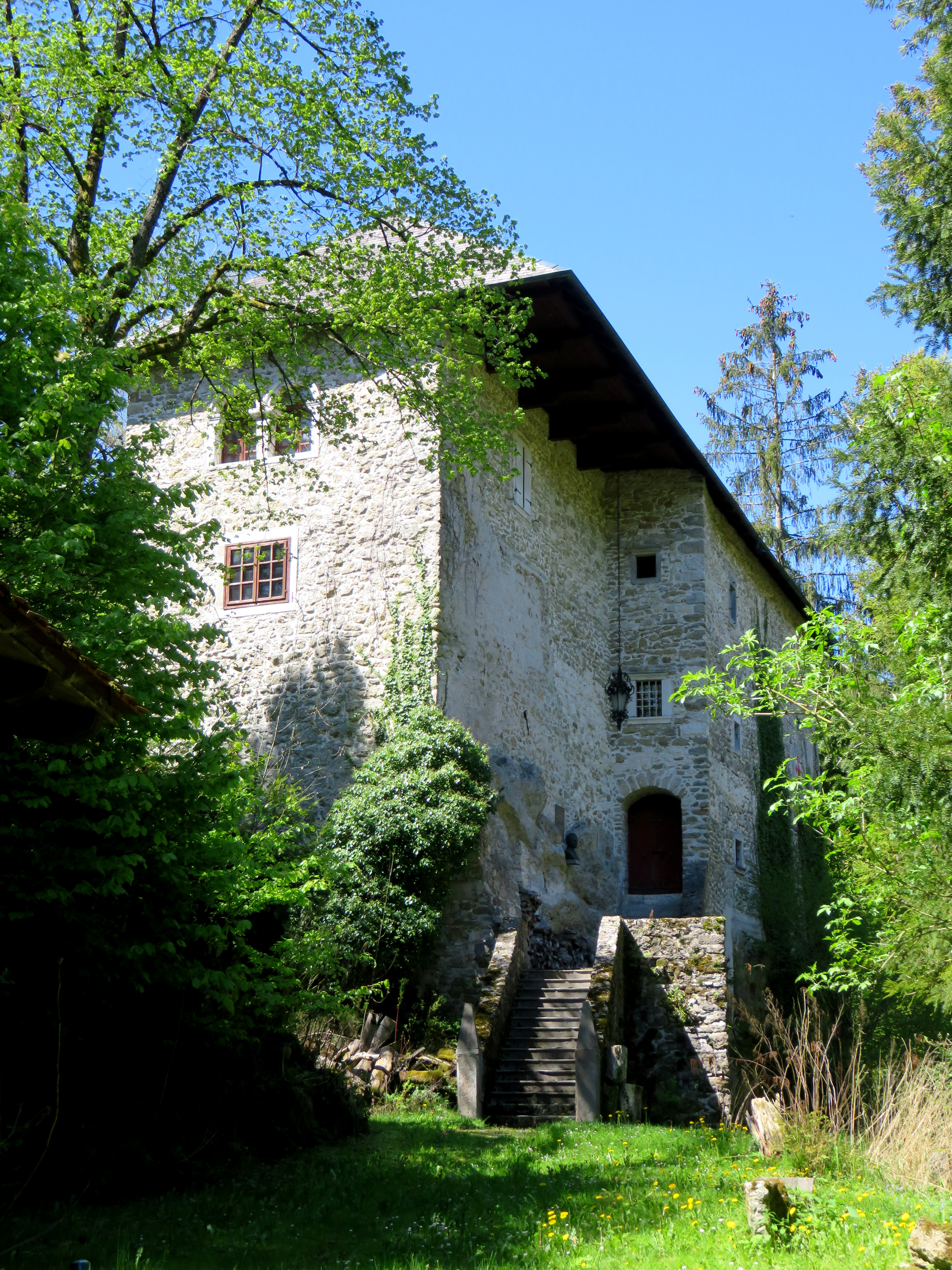
Kolovrat Castle

Kolovrat Castle (sometimes also Spodnji Kolovrat, German: Unterkolowrat) is a castle built on a small hill southeast of the settlement (46°9′53.09532″N 14°52′37.04016″E). It was first mentioned in written documents dating to 1256. It was badly damaged in the 1895 earthquake. After 1945 part of the castle was restored.

== Notable people ==
Notable people that were born or lived in Kolovrat include:

- Silvester Mure (1743–1810), priest and playwright
- Jakob Prašnikar (1784–1841), religious writer and benefactor of Anton Martin Slomšek
