= Villages of Kukës County =

The Kukës County in northeastern Albania is subdivided into 3 municipalities. These municipalities contain 180 towns and villages:
