= Laçi Stadium =

Sports venue in Laçi, Albania

Stadiumi Laçi
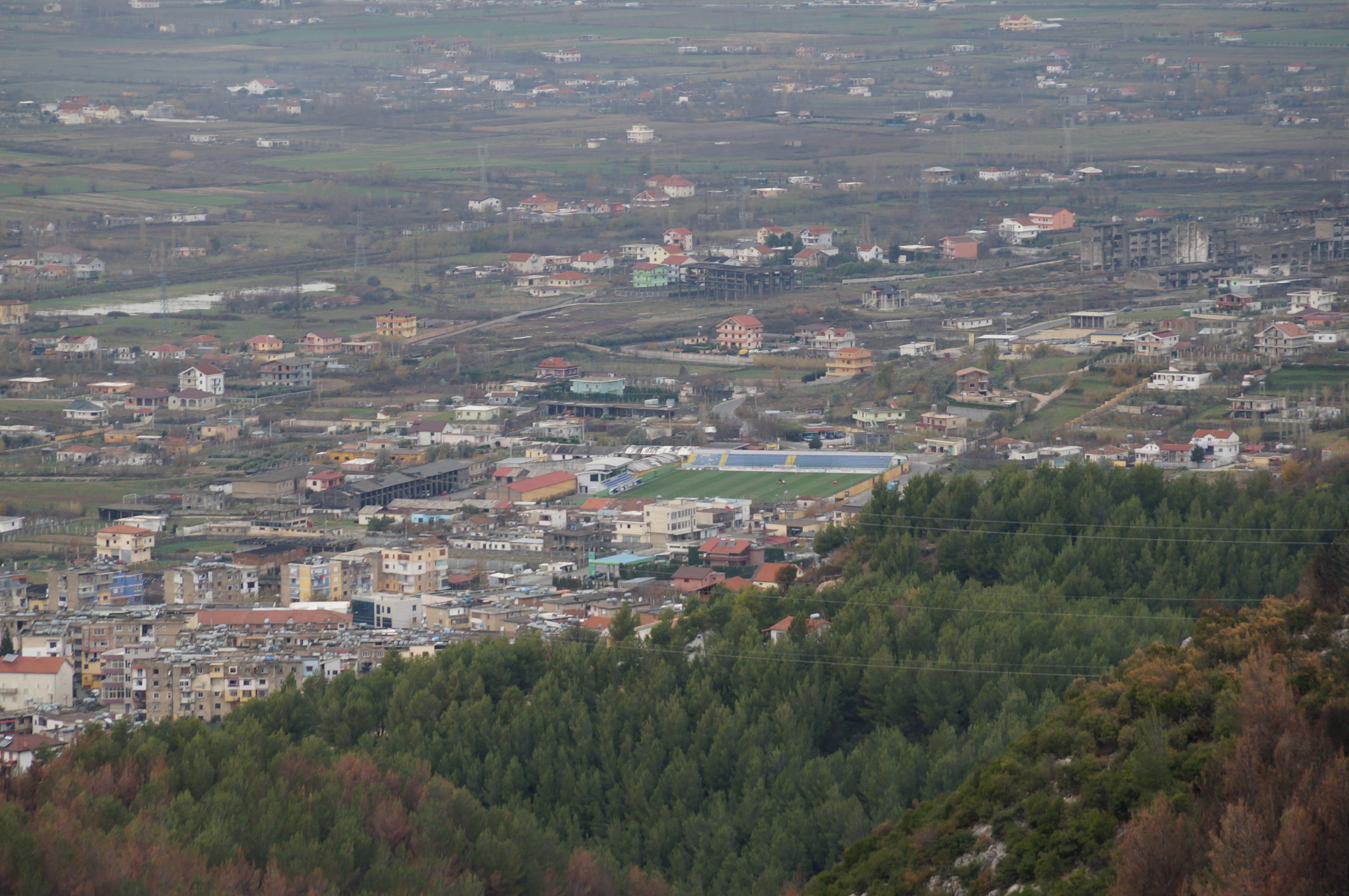
- Interactive map of Stadiumi Laçi
- Full name: Stadiumi Laçi
- Location: Pranë Bashkisë, Laç, Albania
- Coordinates: 41°38′32.9″N 19°42′42″E
- Owner: KF Laçi; Laç Municipality
- Capacity: 2,271

Construction
- Opened: 30 August 2010; 16 years ago
- Renovated: 2010

Tenant
- KF Laçi

Laçi Stadium (Albanian: Stadiumi Laçi) is a multi-use stadium in Laçi, Albania. It is used mostly for football matches and hosts the home games of KF Laçi of the Kategoria Superiore. The stadium currently has an official seated capacity of 2,271.

== Reconstruction ==
Following an impressive 2009–10, KF Laçi decided to reconstruct the stadium in order to meet the UEFA licensing criteria to host their home Europa League match at their own stadium. The three stands surrounding the pitch were renovated and around 2,300 blue plastic seats were installed to turn the stadium into an all seater. The renovation of the stadium was not completed in time for KF Laci's European debut, and they had to play against Dnepr Mogilev of Belarus at the Niko Dovana Stadium in Durrës. The newly renovated stadium was inaugurated in a home league game against Shkumbini on 30 August 2010 in front of 1,500 spectators, where KF Laçi won 2–0.

During the summer of 2015, the stadium's turf was replaced for the first time since 2006, and minor cosmetic renovation was carried out throughout the rest of the stadium.
