= Mark Gurashi =

Albanian footballer

Personal information
- Full name: Mark Gurashi
- Position: Forward

Senior career*
| Years | Team | Apps | (Gls) |
| 1930– | Tirana | | |
- * Club domestic league appearances and goals

Mark Gurashi was Albanian football player who played for SK Tirana during the 1930s, where he won the Kategoria superiore five times in just seven years and where he also won the golden boot for the 1934 season after scoring 12 league goals, which was the highest tally in a season since the league was created in 1930.

== SK Tirana ==
He featured in the first Albanian football championship, the Kategoria superiore 1930, a competition which he also won for the very first time in 1930. With SK Tirana he managed to win 5 championship titles, including the first ever one in 1930.

== Honours ==
- Albanian Superliga: 6

1930, 1931, 1932, 1934, 1936, 1937
