= Adem Karapici =

Albanian footballer and coach

Personal information
- Full name: Adem Karapici
- Date of birth: 1912
- Place of birth: Tirana, Ottoman Empire (modern Albania)
- Date of death: 1972 (aged 59–60)
- Place of death: Albania
- Position: Forward

Senior career*
Years	Team	Apps	(Gls)
1930–1937	Sportklub Tiranë		

Managerial career
- 1947–1948: Albania
- 1947–1950: 17 Nëntori
- 1956–1957: Puna Durrës
- 1962–1964: Traktori Lushnjë
- * Club domestic league appearances and goals

Adem Karapici (1912–1972) was an Albanian football player and coach who played for Sportklub Tiranë in the 1930s where he won six National Championships.

== Managerial career ==
As a coach, he was in charge of Albania national team for five games between 1947 and 1948. He also coached Spartaku Tiranë, Puna Durrës, Luftëtari, Ylli i Kuq Pogradeci and Traktori Lushnjë.

== Honours ==
- Albanian Superliga: 6

1930, 1931, 1932, 1934, 1936, 1937
