= 1932 in Albanian football =

Football in Albania
- Season: 1932

Men's football
- Albanian National Championship: Tirana
- Kategoria e Dytë: Besa Kavajë

The 1932 season was the third competitive association football season in Albania. The Kategoria e Dytë; the second-tier league returned after its absence in the previous season.

== League competitions ==
=== Albanian National Championship ===
The 1932 Albanian National Championship season began on 17 April and ended on 17 July. Tirana won the title for the third successive season running.

Pos	Team	Pld	W	D	L	GF	GA	GR	Pts
1	Tirana (C)	8	5	3	0	29	6	4.833	13
2	Bashkimi Shkodran	8	4	3	1	15	6	2.500	11
3	Teuta	8	5	1	2	25	11	2.273	11
4	Skënderbeu	8	2	1	5	14	13	1.077	5
5	Elbasani	8	0	0	8	4	51	0.078	0

Source: RSSSF.org
Rules for classification: 1) points; 2) goal difference; 3) number of goals scored.
(C) Champions

=== Kategoria e Dytë ===
SK Kavajë were champions of the 1932 Kategoria e Dytë.

May 1932

SK Kavajë	3–1	SK Vlorë
	Report
