= Ludovik Jakova =

Albanian footballer and coach

Personal information
- Date of birth: 14 February 1912
- Date of death: 26 June 1988 (aged 76)
- Place of death: Tirana, Albania

Senior career*
Years	Team	Apps	(Gls)
1934-1937	Tirana		

Managerial career
- 1949-1950: Albania
- * Club domestic league appearances and goals

Ludovik Jakova (14 February 1912 – 26 June 1988) was an Albanian footballer and coach of Albania national football team for a short spell in 1949–1950, where he led the team in six friendlies.

He holds the unenviable record of leading the national team in its heaviest defeat of all time, a 12-0 reverse against Hungary in 1950. He was also the manager of FK Dinamo Tirana in 1950.

== Honours ==
- Albanian Superliga: 3

1934, 1936, 1937
