= Selman Stërmasi =

Albanian footballer (1908–1976)

Personal information
- Date of birth: 9 May 1908
- Place of birth: Tirana, Ottoman Empire
- Date of death: 9 October 1976 (aged 68)
- Place of death: Tirana, Albania

Senior career*
Years	Team	Apps	(Gls)
1928–1930	Roma		
1930–1937	Sportklub Tirana		

Managerial career
- 1930–1937: Sportklub Tirana (player-manager)
- 1937–194x: Sportklub Tirana
- * Club domestic league appearances and goals

Selman Stërmasi (9 May 1908 – 9 October 1976) was an Albanian football player and coach who was an instrumental figure in the early history of KF Tirana. He is generally considered to be one of the club's greatest figures and KF Tirana along with the Albanian Football Association honoured him in 1990 by renaming the Dinamo Stadium to the Selman Stërmasi Stadium.

In 1934 he won the record of jumping (1.71 m or 5 ft 7 in).

== Club career ==
Stërmasi was born in Tirana on 9 May 1908 to a wealthy family of traditional Albanian patriots, where he grew up surrounded by patriotic sentiment and sport. At the age of just 17 in 1925 he became an executive committee member of the Agimi Sports Society, and two years later he would initiate the renaming of the club to Sportklub Tirana. In 1928 he moved to Rome to study at the Fascist Male Academy of Physical Education, before returning to Tirana in 1930 to participate in the first Albanian National Championship, where he was player-manager in the title winning team.

In 1939, he negotiated the sales of SK Tirana players Riza Lushta and Naim Kryeziu to Italian clubs Bari and Roma respectively, and despite the Italian clubs offering Stërmasi 60% of the transfer fees he waived these fees in order to give it all to the players themselves in order to set up their new lives in Italy.

He was married to Nazihe Stërmasi until he passed in 1976.

== Honours ==
Sportklub Tirana

- Albanian Superliga (6): 1930, 1931, 1932, 1934, 1936, 1937
