= 1995–96 Albanian Cup =

Kupa e Shqipërisë

Tournament details
- Country: Albania

Final positions
- Champions: Tirana
- Runners-up: Flamurtari

1995–96 Albanian Cup (Albanian: Kupa e Shqipërisë) was the forty-fourth season of Albania's annual cup competition. It began in August 1995 with the First Round and ended in May 1996 with the Final match. The winners of the competition qualified for the 1996-97 first round of the UEFA Cup. Teuta were the defending champions, having won their first Albanian Cup last season. The cup was won by Tirana.

The rounds were played in a two-legged format similar to those of European competitions. If the aggregated score was tied after both games, the team with the higher number of away goals advanced. If the number of away goals was equal in both games, the match was decided by extra time and a penalty shootout, if necessary.

== First round ==
Games were played on August & September 1995.

Team 1	Agg.	Team 2	1st leg	2nd leg
Memaliaj	2–9	Tirana	1–3	1–6
Gramozi	1–4	Teuta	1–2	0–2 (w/o)
Bylis	1–6	Partizani	1–2	0–4
Durrësi	1–5	Flamurtari	0–2	1–3
Përmeti	3–8	Shqiponja	2–3	1–5
Butrinti	3–4	Albpetrol	1–1	2–3
Korabi	1–4	Shkumbini	1–1	0–3
Cërriku	1–8	Dinamo Tirana	1–4	0–4
Naftëtari	1–8	Tomori	1–3	0–5
Rrogozhina	1–3	Apolonia	1–0	0–3
Burreli	2–2	Vllaznia	2–2	0–0
Pogradeci	1–6	Elbasani	1–4	0–2
Lushnja	0–5	Besëlidhja	0–0	0–5
Kastrioti	4–2	Iliria	2–1	2–1
Sopoti	2–2 (4–5 p)	Laçi	2–0	0–2
Skënderbeu	1–1 (a)	Besa	1–1	0–0

== Second round ==
All sixteen teams of the 1994–95 Superliga and First Division entered in this round. First and second legs were played in January 1996.

Team 1	Agg.	Team 2	1st leg	2nd leg
Kastrioti	1–4	Tirana	0–1	1–3
Besa	0–3	Teuta	0–0	0–3
Laçi	3–4	Partizani	3–1	0–3
Vllaznia	5–1	Albpetrol	4–0	1–1
Flamurtari	1–1 (5–4 p)	Besëlidhja	1–0	0–1
Shqiponja	2–3	Elbasani	2–1	0–2
Apolonia	0–2	Shkumbini	0–0	0–2
Tomori	1–7	Dinamo Tirana	1–2	0–5

== Quarter-finals ==
In this round entered the 8 winners from the previous round.

Team 1	Agg.	Team 2	1st leg	2nd leg
Tirana	3–0	Elbasani	2–0	1–0
Teuta	2–2 (p)	Vllaznia	1–1	1–1
Dinamo Tirana	3–1	Partizani	2–1	1–0
Shkumbini	1–4	Flamurtari	1–0	0–4

== Semi-finals ==
In this round entered the four winners from the previous round.

Team 1	Agg.	Team 2	1st leg	2nd leg
Tirana	4–1	Dinamo Tirana	1–0	3–1
Flamurtari	3–2	Teuta	1–1	2–1

== Final ==
15 May 1996
18:00

Tirana	1–1	Flamurtari
Dede 72'		Daullja 69'
Penalties
Alimehmeti (penalty scored); Minga (penalty scored); Ruhi (penalty scored); Kukli (penalty missed); Malko (penalty scored)	4–3	(penalty missed) Perloshi; (penalty scored) Bushi; (penalty scored) Muka; (penalty scored) Vito; (penalty missed) Driza

Qemal Stafa Stadium, Tirana
Attendance: 9,500
Referee: Luan Zylfo
