= 1937 in Albanian football =

Football in Albania
- Season: 1937

Men's football
- Albanian National Championship: Tirana

The 1937 season was the seventh competitive association football season in Albania. The Kategoria e Dytë; the second-tier league was not played for the 1937 season.

== League competitions ==
=== Albanian National Championship ===
The 1937 Albanian National Championship season began on 25 April and ended on 7 November. Tirana won their sixth title.

Pos	Team	Pld	W	D	L	GF	GA	GR	Pts
1	Tirana (C)	18	17	1	0	74	8	9.250	35
2	Vllaznia	18	14	1	3	55	15	3.667	29
3	Besa	18	10	2	6	49	20	2.450	22
4	Skënderbeu	18	8	2	8	22	31	0.710	18
5	Bashkimi Elbasanas	18	7	3	8	28	28	1.000	17
6	Bardhyli	18	6	3	9	22	42	0.524	15
7	Dragoj	18	4	5	9	18	36	0.500	13
8	Durrësi	18	4	3	11	13	35	0.371	11
9	Ismail Qemali	18	3	4	11	10	43	0.233	10
10	Tomori	18	3	4	11	17	50	0.340	10

Source: RSSSF.org
Rules for classification: 1) points; 2) goal difference; 3) number of goals scored.
(C) Champions
