= KF Tirana in European football =

Football club in Albania

KF Tirana are the Albanian football club with the best performance through all European competitions. They have the most participations, matches, wins, points and experience in Europe among all other Albanian clubs.

Tirana holds the record for the most ties won (14) (once directly by draw) along their road. They are the most successful Albanian team in European competitions, since making their European debut in the 1965–66 European Cup and the first Albanian squad to win a tie in European performances. They reached Round of 16 four times, of which three times in the European Cup (now Champions League) alone in 1980s, making it the Albanian team to have progressed farthest in any European competition. Tirana is the team that were able to overturn the first leg negative result to their advantage in at least four occasions; worth to remember their great second legs wins against Ħamrun Spartans, FC Bobruisk, Dinamo Tbilisi, ND Gorica; additionally good overturns against Apollon Limassol and Ferencvarosi TC. Even though at 14 attempts they have not passed more than one round, KF Tirana are the Albanian team which has won more ties in Europe throughout their long history. Another significant international result comes at Balkans Cup of season 1981 where they went on the final, but lost both matches against Beroe Stara Zagora.

Along their European road, KF Tirana has met many squads in Europe, such as: FC Bayern Munich, Standard Liège, AFC Ajax, Malmö FF, IFK Göteborg, Ferencvárosi TC, PFC CSKA Sofia, Red Star, Besiktas JK. etc.

Additionally, white and blues hold the all-time record for the highest IFFHS ranking of an Albanian football club, being ranked as high as 31st in the world in 1987, as result of good performances preceded 1986–87. KF Tirana started competing for the first time in the European Cup 1965–66. Below are all matches played and up-to-date rankings.

== Notable European Campaigns ==
Season	Achievement	Notes
UEFA Champions League
1982-83	Round of 16	eliminated by (Ukraine) Dynamo Kyiv both matches were not played
1988–89	Round of 16	eliminated by (Sweden) Göteborg 0–3 in Tirana and 1–0 in Göteborg
1989-90	Round of 16	eliminated by (Germany) Bayern Munich 3–1 in Munich and 0–3 in Tirana

Season	Achievement	Notes
UEFA Europa League
2020-21	Play-Off	eliminated by (Switzerland) Young Boys 0–3 in Bern

Season	Achievement	Notes
UEFA Cup Winners' Cup
1986-87	Round of 16	eliminated by (Sweden) Malmö 0–3 in Tirana and 0–0 in Malmö
1994-95	Round of 32	eliminated by (Denmark) Brøndby 3–0 in Brøndby and 0–1 in Tirana

Season	Achievement	Notes
Balkans Cup
1981-83	Runners Up	eliminated by (Bulgaria) Beroe Stara Zagora 0–3 in Stara Zagora and 1–3 in Tirana

=== Player records ===
- Most appearances in UEFA club competitions: 31 appearances:
  - Elvis Sina
- Top scorer in UEFA club competitions: 10 goals – Indrit Fortuzi

== European performance table ==
Season	Competition	Round	Country	Opposition	Home	Away
1964–66	Balkans Cup	Group B	(Bulgaria)	Cherno More Varna	0–0	0–1
1964–66	Balkans Cup	Group B	(Turkey)	Beşiktaş J.K.	2–0	1–1
1964–66	Balkans Cup	Group B	(Romania)	Rapid București	1–2	1–3
1965–66	European Champion Clubs' Cup	1R	(Scotland)	Kilmarnock F.C.	0–0	0–1
1966–67	European Champion Clubs' Cup	1R	(Norway)	Vålerenga	n.p	n.p
1969–70	European Champion Clubs' Cup	1R	(Belgium)	Standard Liège	1–1	0–3
1970–71	European Champion Clubs' Cup	1R	(Netherlands)	AFC Ajax	2–2	0–2
1975	Balkans Cup	Group B	(Greece)	Panionios	6–0	1–2
1975	Balkans Cup	Group B	(Socialist Federal Republic of Yugoslavia)	Radnički Niš	0–0	0–3
1981-83	Balkans Cup	Group B	(Greece)	Larissa	3–0	1–3
1981-83	Balkans Cup	Group B	(Socialist Federal Republic of Yugoslavia)	Sloboda Tuzla	n.d	n.d
1981-83	Balkans Cup	Final	(Bulgaria)	Beroe Stara Zagora	0-1	0-3
1982–83	European Champion Clubs' Cup	1R	(Northern Ireland)	Linfield	1–0	1–2
1982–83	European Champion Clubs' Cup	Round of 16	(Ukraine)	Dynamo Kyiv	n.p	n.p
1983–84	UEFA Cup Winners' Cup	1R	(Sweden)	Hammarby IF	2–1	0–3
1986–87	UEFA Cup Winners' Cup	1R	(Romania)	FC Dinamo București	1–0	2–1
1986–87	UEFA Cup Winners' Cup	Round of 16	(Sweden)	Malmö FF	0–3	0–0
1988–89	European Champion Clubs' Cup	1R	(Malta)	Ħamrun Spartans	2–0	1–2
1988–89	European Champion Clubs' Cup	Round of 16	(Sweden)	IFK Göteborg	0–3	0–1
1989–90	European Champion Clubs' Cup	1R	(Malta)	Sliema Wanderers	5–0	0–1
1989–90	European Champion Clubs' Cup	Round of 16	(Germany)	FC Bayern Munich	0–3	1–3
1990–91	Balkans Cup	QF	(Socialist Federal Republic of Yugoslavia)	Budućnost Titograd	0–0	1–2
1994–95	UEFA Cup Winners' Cup	QR	(Belarus)	FC Bobruisk	3–0	1–4
1994–95	UEFA Cup Winners' Cup	1R	(Denmark)	Brøndby IF	0–1	0–3
1995–96	UEFA Cup	QR	(Israel)	Hapoel Be'er Sheva FC	0–1	0–2
1996–97	UEFA Cup	1QR	(Croatia)	NK Croatia Zagreb	2–6	0–4
1998–99	UEFA Cup	1QR	(Slovakia)	FK Inter Bratislava	0–2	0–2
1999–00	UEFA Champions League	1QR	(Iceland)	Íþróttabandalag Vestmannaeyja	1–2	0–1
2000–01	UEFA Champions League	1QR	(Moldova)	FC Zimbru Chisinau	2–3	2–3
2001–02	UEFA Cup	QR	(Cyprus)	Apollon Limassol	3–2	1–3
2002–03	UEFA Cup	QR	(Romania)	Național București	0–1	2–2
2003–04	UEFA Champions League	1Q	(Georgia (country))	Dinamo Tbilisi	3–0 (4:2 p)	0–3
2003–04	UEFA Champions League	2QR	(Austria)	Grazer AK	1–5	1–2
2004–05	UEFA Champions League	1QR	(Belarus)	FC Gomel	0–1	2–0
2004–05	UEFA Champions League	2QR	(Hungary)	Ferencvárosi TC	2–3	1–0
2005–06	UEFA Champions League	1QR	(Slovenia)	ND Gorica	3–0	0–2
2005–06	UEFA Champions League	2QR	(Bulgaria)	PFC CSKA Sofia	0–2	0–2
2006–07	UEFA Cup	1QR	(Croatia)	NK Varteks	2–0	1–1
2006–07	UEFA Cup	2QR	(Turkey)	Kayserispor	0–2	1–3
2007–08	UEFA Champions League	1QR	(Slovenia)	NK Domžale	1–2	0–1
2009–10	UEFA Champions League	2QR	(Norway)	Stabæk	1–1	0–4
2010–11	UEFA Europa League	1QR	(Hungary)	Zalaegerszegi TE	0–0	1–0 (aet)
2010–11	UEFA Europa League	2QR	(Netherlands)	FC Utrecht	1–1	0–4
2011–12	UEFA Europa League	2QR	(Slovakia)	FC Spartak Trnava	0–0	1–3
2012–13	UEFA Europa League	1QR	(Luxembourg)	CS Grevenmacher	2–0	0–0
2012–13	UEFA Europa League	2QR	(Norway)	Aalesunds FK	1–1	0–5
2017–18	UEFA Europa League	1QR	(Israel)	Maccabi Tel Aviv F.C.	0–3	0–2
2020–21	UEFA Champions League	1QR	(Georgia (country))	Dinamo Tbilisi	—N/a	2–0
2020–21	UEFA Champions League	2QR	(Serbia)	Red Star Belgrade	0−1	—N/a
2020–21	UEFA Europa League	3QR		BYE	—N/a	—N/a
2020–21	UEFA Europa League	PO	(Switzerland)	Young Boys	—N/a	0−3
2022–23	UEFA Champions League	1QR	(Luxembourg)	F91 Dudelange	1−2	0–1
2022–23	UEFA Europa Conference League	2QR	(Bosnia and Herzegovina)	HŠK Zrinjski	0–1	2–3
2023–24	UEFA Conference League	1QR	(Georgia (country))	Dinamo Batumi	1–1	2–1
2023–24	UEFA Conference League	2QR	(Turkey)	Besiktas JK	1-3	0-2

=== Balkans Cup performance ===
Season	Round	Country	Country	Home	Away	Qual/Elim
Balkans Cup 1964–66	1R	(Bulgaria)	PFC Cherno More Varna	0–0	0–1	
Balkans Cup 1964–66	1R	(Turkey)	Beşiktaş J.K.	2–0	1–1	
Balkans Cup 1964–66	1R	(Romania)	FC Rapid București	1–2	1–3	
Balkans Cup 1975	1R	(Greece)	Panionios	6–0	1–2	
Balkans Cup 1975	1R	(Serbia)	FK Radnički Niš	0–0	0–3	
Balkans Cup 1981	1R	(Greece)	AEL	3–0	1–3	
Balkans Cup 1981	2R	(Bosnia and Herzegovina)	FK Sloboda Tuzla	3–0	3–0	
Balkans Cup 1981	Final	(Bulgaria)	PFC Beroe Stara Zagora	1–3	0–3	
Balkans Cup 1990	1R	(Montenegro)	FK Budućnost Podgorica	0–0	0–1	

- QR = Qualifying Round
- 1R = 1st round
- 2R = 2nd round
- n.p = non participation

Overall	GP	W	D	L	GF	GA	GD
Home	9	4	3	2	16	5	+11
Away	9	1	1	7	7	17	−10
Total	18	5	4	9	23	22	+1

=== By country ===
Country	Pld	W	D	L	GF	GA	GD	Q	E
Austria	2	0	0	2	2	7	−5	0	1
Belarus	4	2	0	2	6	5	+1	2	0
Belgium	2	0	1	1	1	4	−3	0	1
Bosnia	6	2	0	2	8	4	+4	1	1
Bulgaria	6	0	1	5	1	11	−10	0	3
Croatia	4	1	1	2	5	11	−6	1	1
Cyprus	2	1	0	1	4	5	−1	0	1
Denmark	2	0	0	2	0	4	−4	0	1
Germany	2	0	0	2	1	6	−5	0	1
Georgia	5	3	1	1	8	5	+3	3	0
Greece	4	2	0	2	11	5	+6	2	0
Hungary	4	2	1	1	4	3	+1	1	1
Iceland	2	0	0	2	1	3	−2	0	1
Israel	4	0	0	4	0	8	−8	0	2
Luxembourg	6	1	1	2	3	3	0	1	1
Malta	4	2	0	2	8	3	+5	2	0
Moldova	2	0	0	2	4	6	−2	0	1
Montenegro	2	0	1	1	0	1	−1	0	0
Netherlands	4	0	2	2	3	9	−6	0	2
Northern Ireland	2	1	0	1	2	2	0	1	0
Norway	4	0	2	2	2	11	−9	0	2
Romania	6	2	1	3	7	9	−2	1	2
Scotland	2	0	1	1	0	1	−1	0	1
Serbia	3	0	1	2	0	4	−4	0	1
Slovakia	4	0	1	3	1	7	−6	0	2
Slovenia	4	1	0	3	4	5	−1	1	1
Sweden	6	1	1	4	2	11	−3	0	3
Switzerland	1	0	0	1	0	3	−3	0	1
Turkey	6	1	1	4	5	-10	−5	1	2
Ukraine	2	0	0	0	0	0	0	0	1

- Q = Qualified
- E = Eliminated

Last Update: 03 August 2023

=== UEFA club competition record ===
Competition	GP	PP	W	D	L	GF	GA	GD	P
Champions League	40	16	8	4	28	37	65	−28	–
Cup Winners' Cup	10	3	4	1	5	9	16	−7	–
UEFA Cup / Europa League	28	11	5	7	16	20	54	−34	–
UEFA Europa Conference League	8	2	1	2	5	7	13	−6	–
Intertoto Cup	0	0	0	0	0	0	0	0	–
Inter-Cities Fairs Cup	0	0	0	0	0	0	0	0	–
UEFA Super Cup	0	0	0	0	0	0	0	0	–
Intercontinental Cup	0	0	0	0	0	0	0	0	–
Total	86	32	18	14	54	73	148	−75	68

Overall	GP	W	D	L	GF	GA	GD
Home	41	11	9	21	45	59	−14
Away	43	7	4	32	27	87	−60
Total	84	18	13	53	72	146	−74

==== Europe and Balkan total ====
Overall	GP	W	D	L	GF	GA	GD
Home	50	15	12	23	61	64	-3
Away	52	8	5	39	34	104	−70
Total	102	23	17	62	95	168	−73

=== World and European rankings ===
UEFA club coefficient ranking

(As of 4 August 2023)

Rank	Team	Points
222	(Romania) Sepsi OSK	5.500
223	(Bulgaria) Levski Sofia	5.500
224	(Latvia) Valmieras FK	5.500
225	(Albania) KF Tirana	5.500
226	(Bosnia and Herzegovina) FK Borac Banja Luka	5.500
227	(San Marino) Tre Penne	5.500
228	(Sweden) Hammarby IF	5.500

Last Update: 4 August 2023
