= 1934 in Albanian football =

Football in Albania
- Season: 1934

Men's football
- Albanian National Championship: Tirana
- Kategoria e Dytë: Shqiponja Gjirokastër

The 1934 season was the fifth competitive association football season in Albania.

== League competitions ==
=== Albanian National Championship ===
The 1934 Albanian National Championship season began on 15 April and ended on 22 July. Tirana won their fourth title.

Pos	Team	Pld	W	D	L	GF	GA	GR	Pts
1	Tirana (C)	12	10	1	1	54	8	6.750	21
2	Skënderbeu	12	8	2	2	27	8	3.375	18
3	Bashkimi Shkodran	12	8	1	3	25	11	2.273	17
4	Teuta	12	6	0	6	18	23	0.783	12
5	Kavaja	12	3	3	6	14	20	0.700	9
6	Bashkimi Elbasanas	12	2	2	8	12	36	0.333	6
7	Sportklub Vlora	12	0	1	11	4	48	0.083	1

Source: RSSSF.org
Rules for classification: 1) points; 2) goal difference; 3) number of goals scored.
(C) Champions

=== Kategoria e Dytë ===
Shqiponja Gjirokastër were champions of the 1934 Kategoria e Dytë.

24 June

Shqiponja Gjirokastër	3–0	Vetëtima Himarë

Tirana, Albania

Match was suspended after 81 minutes
