= Bahri Ishka =

Albanian footballer and coach

Personal information
- Full name: Bahri Ishka
- Date of birth: 27 June 1944
- Place of birth: Tirana, Albania
- Date of death: 9 January 2007 (aged 62)
- Place of death: Tirana, Albania
- Position: Striker

Youth career
- 1958–1962: 17 Nëntori

Senior career*
Years	Team	Apps	(Gls)
1962–1972	17 Nëntori		

International career
1964–1967	Albania	3	(0)

Managerial career
- Luftëtari
- Apolonia
- Traktori
- Skënderbeu
- Dinamo Tirana
- 1974: Albania U-21
- 1992-1993: Albania U-21
- * Club domestic league appearances and goals

Bahri Ishka (27 June 1944 – 9 January 2007) was an Albanian football player and coach.

== Playing career ==
=== Club ===
Born in Tirana, Ishka played his entire career for 17 Nëntori Tirana and won 4 league titles with them under manager Myslym Alla and alongside national team players Skënder Hyka and Ali Mema.

=== International ===
He made his debut for Albania in a May 1964 FIFA World Cup qualification match against the Netherlands in Rotterdam and earned a total of 3 caps, scoring no goals.

His final international was an April 1967 European Championship qualification match against West Germany in Dortmund.

== Managerial career ==
After retiring as a player, Ishka earned a degree in sports to become Prof. Dr. Bahri Ishka and he managed Albanian Superliga clubs Luftëtari Gjirokastër, Apolonia Fier, Traktori Lushnja, Skënderbeu Korçë and Dinamo Tirana.

== Honours ==
- Kategoria Superiore: 4

1965, 1966, 1968, 1970

- Albanian Cup: 1

1963
