= Enver Shehu =

Albanian footballer (1934–2009)

Personal information
- Date of birth: 24 January 1934
- Place of birth: Tirana, Albania
- Date of death: 22 October 2009 (aged 75)
- Place of death: Tirana, Albania

Senior career*
Years	Team	Apps	(Gls)
1954–1955	Luftëtari Tiranë		
1955–1963	17 Nëntori		

International career
1957	Albania	1	(0)

Managerial career
- 1964–1969: 17 Nëntori (assistant)
- 1980–1987: 17 Nëntori
- 1992–1993: Tirana
- 1996–1997: Tirana
- 1998: Teuta
- * Club domestic league appearances and goals

Enver Shehu (24 January 1934 – 22 October 2009) was an Albanian football player and manager who played for and managed SK Tirana.

== Club career ==
Shehu was joint top scorer in the 1958 season, along with Partizani's Refik Resmja, both scoring six goals.

== International career ==
Shehu made his debut for Albania in a September 1957 friendly match against China, his sole international appearance.

== Managerial career ==
With 17 Nëntori, later Tirana, Shehu won three league titles and four domestic cups.

== Honours ==
=== As a manager ===
- Albanian Superliga: 1982, 1985, 1997
