= 1931 in Albanian football =

Football in Albania
- Season: 1931

Men's football
- Albanian National Championship: Tirana

The 1931 season was the second competitive association football season in Albania. The Kategoria e Dytë; the second-tier league was not played for the 1931 season.

== League competitions ==
=== Albanian National Championship ===
The 1931 Albanian National Championship season began on 19 April and ended on 5 July. Tirana and Teuta finished in the top spot in their respective groups to qualify for the championship play-off. Tirana won the play-offs and became champions for the second successive season running.

Pos	Team	Pld	W	D	L	GF	GA	GR	Pts	TIR	BAS	SKV
1	Tirana (Q)	4	2	1	1	6	2	3.000	5		0–0	4–1
2	Bashkimi Shkodran	4	2	1	1	4	3	1.333	5	1–0		2–1
3	Sportklub Vlora	4	1	0	3	4	9	0.444	2	0–2	2–1	

Source: RSSSF.org
Rules for classification: 1) points; 2) goal difference; 3) number of goals scored.
(Q) Qualified for the phase indicated

Pos	Team	Pld	W	D	L	GF	GA	GR	Pts	TEU	SKË	ELB	MUZ
1	Teuta (Q)	6	5	1	0	15	2	7.500	11		2–0	4–0	3–0
2	Skënderbeu	6	2	2	2	13	7	1.857	6	2–2		3–0	7–0
3	Elbasani	6	3	0	3	10	6	1.667	6	0–2	2–0		6–1
4	Muzaka	6	0	1	5	2	20	0.100	1	0–2	1–1	0–1	

Source: RSSSF.org
Rules for classification: 1) points; 2) goal difference; 3) number of goals scored.
(Q) Qualified for the phase indicated
