= Shallvare =

Football stadium in Tirana, Albania

- Full name: Fusha e Shallvarve
- Location: Tirana, Albania
- Owner: KF Tirana
- Capacity: unrestricted
- Field size: 104m x 65m

Construction
- Built: 1800s
- Demolished: 1951

Tenant
- KF Tirana (1920–1946)

Shallvare was a football stadium in Tirana, Albania. It was home to KF Tirana from 1920 until 1946, when the club moved to the Qemal Stafa Stadium. It was located in the centre of Tirana, nearby the existing Shallvare block. Aside from football, T.Selenica stated that the field served as an amusement centre for the youth of Tirana to enjoy, and it was a popular gathering place where various games were played during religious holidays.

== History ==
Before its use as a football ground the site was use by the Ottoman garrison as a playground, and in 1916 it served as a runway for the Austrian-Hungarian Imperial and Royal Aviation Troops. The first football game was played at the ground in 1920 between what would later be known as KF Tirana and a team made up of the occupying Austrian-Hungarians. In 1925 there were changing rooms built at the ground, and in the early 1930s there was a 4-lane athletics track built around the football pitch. The administrator of the ground was the football referee, Besim Hamdiu (Qorri), who only had one assistant in the maintenance of the ground.

The ground did not have a main stand or seating area for spectators, but rather a two storied building that was constructed in 1923 by a member of parliament Masar Kelliçi. The building stood 50 metres away from the football pitch and was located in line with the middle of the pitch, with its balcony facing the field and the Dajt mountains. The ground was also used for other sporting events as well as military parades, one of which the president and later king Ahmet Zogu attended in 1927.

The Albania national team also used the ground in preparation for their successful 1946 Balkan Cup campaign. Other Albanian athletes trained at Shallvare, including Begeja who finished runner-up in the 100 metres at the Balkan Games.

The facility was destroyed in 1951 and replaced with Soviet-style apartment blocks.
