= 1931 Albanian National Championship =

Albanian National Championship
- Season: 1931
- Champions: KF Tirana
- Matches: 18
- Goals: 54 (3 per match)
- Top goalscorer: Aristotel Samsuri (Skënderbeu)
- Biggest home win: Skënderbeu 7-0 SK Muzaka
- Biggest away win: 0-2 by 3 teams
- Highest scoring: Skënderbeu 7-0 SK Muzaka & SK Elbasani 6-1 SK Muzaka

The 1931 Albanian National Championship was the second edition of the Albanian National Championship, the top professional league for association football clubs.

== Teams ==
Team name	Location	Name Changes
Flamurtari	Vlorë, Vlorë County	
Skënderbeu	Korçë, Korçë County	
Teuta	Durrës, Durrës County	
KF Tirana	Tirana, Tirana County	
Bashkimi Shkodran	Shkodër, Shkodër County	
SK Elbasani	Elbasan, Elbasan County	Urani changed name to SK. Elbasani
SK Muzaka	Berat, Berat County	

=== Team locations ===
Location of the teams in the 1931 Albanian National Championship

== Overview ==
It was contested by 7 teams. The tournament ran from April 19 to July 5, 1931. SK Tirana won the championship. For the 1931 season the league was divided into two groups, Group A consisted of SK Tirana, Bashkimi Shkodran from Shkodër and Sportklub Vlora from Vlorë. Group B consisted of Teuta from Durrës, Skënderbeu from Korçë, SK Elbasani and SK Muzaka from Berat. Urani changed their name to SK Elbasani for this season.

== Regular season ==
=== Group A ===
Pos	Team	Pld	W	D	L	GF	GA	GR	Pts	TIR	BAS	SKV
1	Tirana (Q)	4	2	1	1	6	2	3.000	5		0–0	4–1
2	Bashkimi Shkodran	4	2	1	1	4	3	1.333	5	1–0		2–1
3	Sportklub Vlora	4	1	0	3	4	9	0.444	2	0–2	2–1	

Source: RSSSF.org
Rules for classification: 1) points; 2) goal difference; 3) number of goals scored.
(Q) Qualified for the phase indicated

=== Group B ===
Pos	Team	Pld	W	D	L	GF	GA	GR	Pts	TEU	SKË	ELB	MUZ
1	Teuta (Q)	6	5	1	0	15	2	7.500	11		2–0	4–0	3–0
2	Skënderbeu	6	2	2	2	13	7	1.857	6	2–2		3–0	7–0
3	Elbasani	6	3	0	3	10	6	1.667	6	0–2	2–0		6–1
4	Muzaka	6	0	1	5	2	20	0.100	1	0–2	1–1	0–1	

Source: RSSSF.org
Rules for classification: 1) points; 2) goal difference; 3) number of goals scored.
(Q) Qualified for the phase indicated

Note: 'Bashkimi Shkodran' is the previous name for Vllaznia, 'Sportklub Vlora' is the previous name for Flamurtari and 'SK Muzaka' is the previous name for Tomori

== Championship final ==
- SK Tirana 1-1 Teuta
- Teuta 0-3 SK Tirana

== Top Goal Scorer ==
- Aristotel Samsuri - Skënderbeu - 9 goals

== Winning Squad of SK Tirana ==
Note: Flags indicate national team as defined under FIFA eligibility rules; some limited exceptions apply. Players may hold more than one non-FIFA nationality.

No.	Pos.	Nation	Player
—		ALB	Rudolf Gurashi
—		ALB	Vasfi Samimi
—		ALB	Abdullah Sherri
—		ALB	Sabit Coku
—		ALB	Vasil Kajano
—		ALB	Bexhet Jolldashi
—		ALB	Irfan Gjinali
—		ALB	Muhamet Agolli
—		ALB	Gjon Sabati

No.	Pos.	Nation	Player
—		ALB	Adem Karapici
—		ALB	Isuf Dashi
—		ALB	Hysen Kusi
—		ALB	Hilmi Kosova
—		ALB	Mark Gurashi
—		ALB	Halim Begeja
—	FW	ALB	Emil Hajnali
—		ALB	Llazar Miha
—	FW	ALB	Selman Stermasi (captain)

Trainer: Selman Stermasi
