= Fatmir Frashëri =

Albanian footballer (1941–2019)

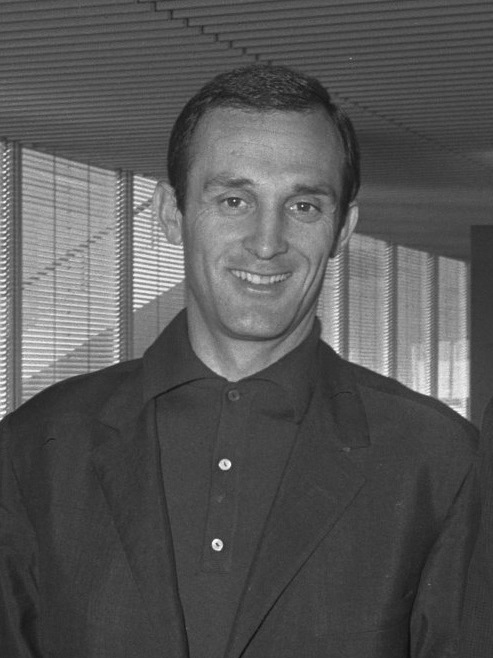
- Frashëri in 1970

Personal information
- Date of birth: 3 April 1941
- Place of birth: Tirana, Albania
- Date of death: 19 July 2019 (aged 78)
- Place of death: Tirana, Albania
- Height: 1.79 m (5 ft 10 in)
- Position: Right back

Youth career
- 1957–1958: Tirana

Senior career*
Years	Team	Apps	(Gls)
1958–1962	17 Nëntori		
1962–1964	Partizani		
1964–1972	17 Nëntori		

International career
1963–1970	Albania	12	(0)

Managerial career
- 1975–1980: 17 Nëntori
- 1981: Naftëtari
- 1981–1982: Besa
- 1985–1986: Dinamo
- 1990–1991: Tirana
- 1993–1994: Tirana
- 2003: Tirana
- * Club domestic league appearances and goals

Fatmir Frashëri (3 April 1941 – 19 July 2019) was an Albanian football player who played as a defender for 17 Nëntori Tirana, Partizani and the Albania national team.

== International career ==
Frashëri made his debut for Albania in a June 1963 European Championship qualification match away against Denmark and earned a total of 12 caps, scoring no goals. His final international was an October 1970 European Championship qualification match against Poland.

=== International statistics ===
Appearances and goals by national team and year
National team	Year	Apps	Goals
Albania	1963	2	0
Albania	1964	3	0
Albania	1965	4	0
Albania	1967	2	0
Albania	1970	1	0
Total		12	0

== Managerial career ==
Following his retirement in 1972 he became the head coach of 17 Nëntori Tirana, Naftëtari Qyteti Stalin, Besa Kavajë and Dinamo Tirana.

== Death ==
Fatmir Frashëri died in Tirana on 19 July 2023, at the age of 78.

== Honours ==
=== Player ===
Partizani

- Albanian National Championship (2): 1962–63, 1963–64

Tirana

- Albanian National Championship (4): 1964–65, 1965–66, 1968, 1969–70

=== Manager ===
Tirana

- Albanian National Championship (1): 2002–03
- Albanian Cup (1): 1975–76, 1976–77

Dinamo

- Albanian National Championship (1): 1985–86
