= Ali Mema =

Albanian footballer and manager (1943–2019)

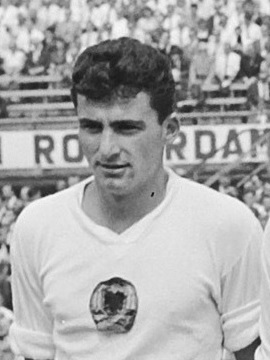

Personal information
- Full name: Ali Mustafa Mema
- Date of birth: 1 February 1943
- Place of birth: Tirana, Albania
- Date of death: 26 March 2019 (aged 76)
- Place of death: Tirana, Albania
- Height: 1.72 m (5 ft 8 in)
- Position: Attacking midfielder

Youth career
- 1958–1960: 17 Nëntori Tirana

Senior career*
Years	Team	Apps	(Gls)
1960–1966	17 Nëntori	?	(?)
1966–1968	Vllaznia	?	(?)
1968–1970	17 Nëntori	?	(?)
1970–1971	Partizani	?	(?)
1971–1972	17 Nëntori	?	(?)
Total		?	(?)

International career
1963–1967	Albania	14	(0)

Managerial career
- 1972–1987: 17 Nëntori (assistant)
- 1998–1999: Tirana
- * Club domestic league appearances and goals

Ali Mema (1 February 1943 – 26 March 2019) was an Albanian professional footballer who played as a midfielder. He played for 17 Nëntori Tirana for the majority of his career as well as the Albania national team, whom he earned 14 senior caps with.

He has been regarded as one of Tirana's greatest players in history.

== Club career ==
Mema was born in Tirana and grew up on Shyqyri Bërxolli Road, which is in the centre of the capital, where he lived with his family that included his brothers Haxhi and Osman, who would both also become professional footballers. He attended the Kostandin Kristoforidhi School near his home, where he represented the school's football team before joining his local team 17 Nëntori Tirana which was near to his family. He initially joined the 17 Nëntori Tirana youth team before being promoted to the senior team in 1960 at the age of just 17. He was told by his youth team coach Xhavit Demneri after training to report to the senior side the following day as he had been called up by first team coach Myslym Alla for the derby against Partizani Tirana. Mema featured in the game as a substitute for legendary striker Refik Resmja with ten minutes remaining, and although his side lost the coach Alla was still highly impressed with Mema and he was promoted to the first team on a permanent basis from that moment on.

Mema was famous especially for his performance as a goalkeeper in the 1962–63 Albanian Cup final against Besa Kavajë. Tirana lost the first leg 3–2 at home but won the second 1–0. The away goals rule wasn't valid at that time in Albanian football, so the match had to be decided by penalty shootouts. Both Tirana's goalkeepers (Metani and Beliu) were injured, so the players suggested coach Myslym Alla to place Mema as a goalkeeper, due to Mema's experience in the past in this role. He saved the first three penalties executed by T'habit Rexha, paving Tirana's path to victory after Pavllo Bukoviku scored the first three for Mema's side.

Mema retired from football in 1972 aged just 29 after the club decided that the renovation of the team was needed, meaning that there would be no place for the established and mature players like him.

== International career ==
He made his debut for Albania in a June 1963 Olympic Games qualification match against Bulgaria in Tirana and earned a total of 14 caps, scoring no goals. His final international was a December 1967 European Championship qualification match against West Germany.

=== International statistics ===
Appearances and goals by national team and year
National team	Year	Apps	Goals
Albania	1963	3	0
Albania	1964	3	0
Albania	1965	4	0
Albania	1967	4	0
Total		14	0

== Style of play ==
Mema was hailed as one of Albania's greatest players in the 1960s and 1970s. Despite standing at only 5 ft 8 in, Mema was an areal threat and is known to have scored at least a heading goal against every opponent he has faced. He played most of his career as a midfielder, where he excelled with his technique, ball control, vision, and was also a player who could use either foot. He had also been praised by his peers for the determination, discipline and fairplay he displayed on the pitch.

== Personal life ==
Ali was part of Mema dynasty, a family which has produced several footballers throughout the years. His brothers Haxhi and Osman were both footballers, as well as his nephew and Haxhi's son Sulejman. He had two sons, including Ardian Mema, who was also a footballer who played mostly for Tirana and is currently its coach.

== Honours ==
- Albanian Superliga: 4

1965, 1966, 1968, 1970
