= Krenar Alimehmeti =

Albanian footballer and manager

Personal information
- Full name: Krenar Alimehmeti
- Date of birth: 15 January 1966 (age 60)
- Place of birth: Albania
- Position: Midfielder

Senior career*
Years	Team	Apps	(Gls)
1986–2003	(Nëntori) Tirana		

International career
1988	Albania	1	(0)

Managerial career
- 2003: Tirana (caretaker)
- 2005–2006: Tirana
- 2007: Tirana (caretaker)
- 2007–2008: Elbasani
- 2009–2010: Elbasani
- 2015–2016: Tirana B
- 2017–: Tirana B
- * Club domestic league appearances and goals

Krenar Alimehmeti (born 17 August 1966) is an Albanian retired football player and current manager. Many fans know him as Krenar Zhubi.

== Playing career ==
=== Club ===
As a player, he represented KF Tirana formerly known as 17 Nëntori Tirana with whom he won 6 league titles.

=== International ===
He also represented the Albania National Team in 1988 in a World Cup Qualifier against Poland. He started that game and played the full 90 minutes but never featured for Albania again.

== Managerial career ==
He was named the coach of KS Elbasani before the start of the 2007–2008 season, he left the club after one season. In 2011, Alimehmeti was named deputy chairman of the board of directors at Tirana.

== Political career ==
In 2013, Alimehmeti was second on the Party for Justice, Integration and Unity list in Tirana for the General Parliamentary Elections.

== Honours ==
- Kategoria Superiore (6): 1988, 1989, 1996, 1997, 1999, 2000
