= Myslym Alla =

Albanian footballer (1919–1999)

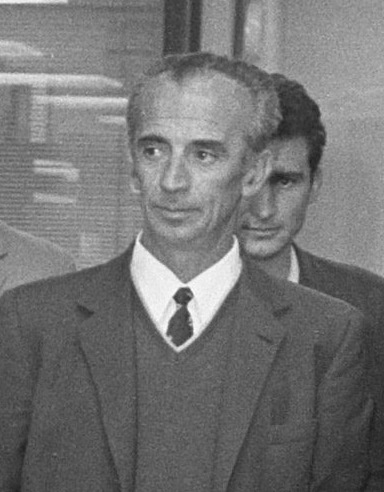

Personal information
- Date of birth: 15 April 1919
- Place of birth: Tirana, Albania
- Date of death: 1 January 1999 (aged 79)
- Place of death: Tirana, Albania

Youth career
- –1936: SK Tirana

Senior career*
Years	Team	Apps	(Gls)
1936–194x	SK Tirana		

International career
- Albania

Managerial career
- 1952: Albania
- 1954–1956: Partizani
- 1956–1972: 17 Nëntori
- 1972–1973: Albania
- * Club domestic league appearances and goals

Myslym 'Lym' Alla (15 April 1919 – 1 January 1999) was an Albanian football player and manager who played for SK Tirana and went on to manage 17 Nëntori and Partizani Tirana.
