= Saimir Malko =

Albanian footballer

Personal information
- Full name: Saimir Malko
- Date of birth: 17 March 1970 (age 56)
- Place of birth: Lushnjë, Albania
- Height: 1.88 m (6 ft 2 in)
- Position: Defender

Youth career
- 1985–1987: Traktori Lushnja

Senior career*
Years	Team	Apps	(Gls)
1987–1989	Traktori		(0)
1989–1990	Partizani		(0)
1990–1991	Traktori	33	(1)
1991–1993	Dinamo Tirana	50	(2)
1993–1996	Tirana	85	(12)
1997	Lushnja	17	(2)
1997–1998	Flamurtari	3	(1)
1998–1999	Tirana	26	(3)
1999–2005	Lushnja	120	(22)
Total		334+	(43)

International career
1990–1991	Albania U21	6	(0)
1994–1996	Albania	15	(0)

Managerial career
- 2008: Lushnja
- 2011–2012: Lushnja
- 2012: Kamza
- 2012–2013: Besëlidhja
- * Club domestic league appearances and goals

Saimir Malko (born 17 March 1970) is an Albanian retired footballer who played for KS Lushnja, Partizani Tirana, Dinamo Tirana, KF Tirana and Flamurtari Vlorë.

== Playing career ==
=== International ===
He made his debut for Albania in a May 1994 friendly match away against Macedonia and earned a total of 15 caps, scoring no goals. His final international was a December 1996 FIFA World Cup qualification match away against Northern Ireland.

== Managerial career ==
After stints in charge of Lushnja and Kamza, Malko was appointed manager of Besëlidhja in December 2012.

== Honours ==
- Albanian Superliga: 3

1995, 1996, 1999
