= Rudolf Gurashi =

Albanian footballer

Senior career*
Years	Team	Apps	(Gls)
1930–????	SK Tirana	?	(?)
- * Club domestic league appearances and goals

Rudolf Gurashi was a former Albanian football player who played for SK Tirana during the 1930s, where he won the Kategoria superiore five times in seven years between 1930 and 1937. Aside from football, he was an avid cyclist, and in 1931 he travelled to France with the intention of taking part in the 1931 Tour de France, but was not selected for the race. He would return to hometown Tiranë to promote the sport.

== SK Tirana ==
He was part of the SK Tirana team that won the inaugural football season in Albania, the 1930 Albanian National Championship. He would go on to win the title five times in seven years between 1930 and 1937.
