= 1981–83 Balkans Cup =

Tournament details
- Country: Balkans
- Teams: 6

Final positions
- Champions: (Bulgaria) Beroe Stara Zagora
- Runners-up: (Albania) 17 Nëntori Tirana

Tournament statistics
- Matches played: 10
- Goals scored: 32 (3.2 per match)

The 1981–83 Balkans Cup was an edition of the Balkans Cup, a football competition for representative clubs from the Balkan states. It was contested by 6 teams and Beroe Stara Zagora won the trophy.

== Group Stage ==
=== Group A ===
Pos	Team	Pld	W	D	L	GF	GA	GR	Pts	Qualification
1	(Bulgaria) Beroe Stara Zagora (A)	4	3	0	1	9	4	2.250	6	Advances to finals
2	(Romania) Steaua București	4	2	1	1	7	5	1.400	5	
3	(Turkey) Galatasaray	4	0	1	3	2	9	0.222	1	

Source: rsssf.com
Rules for classification: 1) points; 2) goal average; 3) number of goals scored
(A) Advance to a further round
11 November 1981

Galatasaray (Turkey)	1–2	(Bulgaria) Beroe Stara Zagora
Akbin 72'		Petrov 65'; Navdenov 84'

Ali Sami Yen, Istanbul

12 May 1982
18:00 EEST (UTC+3)

Galatasaray (Turkey)	1–1	(Romania) Steaua București
Hodžić 41'		Sertov 65'

Ali Sami Yen, Istanbul

20 October 1982

Beroe Stara Zagora (Bulgaria)	2–0	(Romania) Steaua București

Beroe, Stara Zagora

2 November 1982

Steaua București (Romania)	3–2	(Bulgaria) Beroe Stara Zagora

Steaua, Bucharest

1983

Beroe Stara Zagora (Bulgaria)	3–0 Awarded^{1}	(Turkey) Galatasaray

Beroe, Stara Zagora

1983

Steaua București (Romania)	3–0 Awarded^{1}	(Turkey) Galatasaray

Steaua, Bucharest

Notes

- Note 1: Galatasaray withdrew from the tournament after playing their first two games.

=== Group B ===
Pos	Team	Pld	W	D	L	GF	GA	GR	Pts	Qualification
1	(Albania) 17 Nëntori Tirana (A)	2	1	0	1	4	3	1.333	2	Advances to finals
2	(Greece) AEL	2	1	0	1	3	4	0.750	2	
3	(Socialist Federal Republic of Yugoslavia) Sloboda Tuzla (Note: Sloboda Tuzla withdrew from the tournament.) (D)	0	0	0	0	0	0	—	0	Withdrew

Source: rsssf.com
Rules for classification: 1) points; 2) goal average; 3) number of goals scored
(A) Advance to a further round; (D) Disqualified
Notes:
4 November 1981

AEL (Greece)	3–1	(Albania) 17 Nëntori Tirana

Alcazar Stadium, Larissa

5 May 1982

17 Nëntori Tirana (Albania)	3–0	(Greece) AEL

Dinamo Stadium, Tirana

== Finals ==
Team 1	Agg.	Team 2	1st leg	2nd leg
Beroe Stara Zagora (Bulgaria)	6–1	(Albania) 17 Nëntori Tirana	3–0	3–1

=== First leg ===
9 February 1983

Beroe Stara Zagora (Bulgaria)	3–0	(Albania) 17 Nëntori Tirana

Beroe, Stara Zagora

=== Second leg ===
23 February 1983

17 Nëntori Tirana (Albania)	1–3	(Bulgaria) Beroe Stara Zagora

Dinamo, Tirana

Beroe Stara Zagora won 6–1 on aggregate.
