= 1932 Albanian National Championship =

Albanian National Championship
- Season: 1931
- Champions: KF Tirana

The 1932 Albanian National Championship was the third season of the Albanian National Championship, the top professional league for association football clubs.

== Overview ==
It was contested by 5 teams, and KF Tirana won the championship.

== League standings ==
Location of teams in the 1932 Albanian National Championship

Pos	Team	Pld	W	D	L	GF	GA	GR	Pts
1	Tirana (C)	8	5	3	0	29	6	4.833	13
2	Bashkimi Shkodran	8	4	3	1	15	6	2.500	11
3	Teuta	8	5	1	2	25	11	2.273	11
4	Skënderbeu	8	2	1	5	14	13	1.077	5
5	Elbasani	8	0	0	8	4	51	0.078	0

Source: RSSSF.org
Rules for classification: 1) points; 2) goal difference; 3) number of goals scored.
(C) Champions

== Results ==
Home \ Away	BAS	ELB	SKË	TEU	TIR
Bashkimi Shkodran		6–0	2–1	2–1	0–0
Elbasani	1–3		1–5	0–1	2–9
Skënderbeu	0–0	5–0		0–1	1–4
Teuta	2–1	16–0	3–1		1–1
Tirana	1–1	6–0	2–1	6–0	

Source: RSSSF.org
Legend: Blue = home team win; Yellow = draw; Red = away team win.

== Winning Squad of KF Tirana ==
Note: Flags indicate national team as defined under FIFA eligibility rules; some limited exceptions apply. Players may hold more than one non-FIFA nationality.

No.	Pos.	Nation	Player
—		ALB	Abdullah Shehri
—		ALB	Bexhet Jolldashi
—		ALB	Muhamet Agolli
—		ALB	Vasil Kajani
—		ALB	Rifat Jolldashij
—		ALB	Hyse Kusi
—		ALB	Adem Karapici
—		ALB	Hasan Maluci

No.	Pos.	Nation	Player
—		ALB	Halim Begeja
—	FW	ALB	Selman Stermasi (captain)
—	FW	ALB	Emil Hajnali
—		ALB	Isuf Dashi
—		ALB	Haki Korça
—		ALB	Hajri Jegeni
—		ALB	Gjon Sabati

Trainer: Selman Stermasi
