= KF Tirana =

Association football club in Albania

Tirana
- Full name: Klubi i Futbollit Tirana
- Nicknames: Bardheblutë (The White and Blues); Noltmadhnia (The Highness)
- Founded: 15 August 1920; 106 years ago as Shoqëria Agimi
- Ground: Selman Stërmasi Stadium
- Capacity: 7,308
- Owner(s): Halili SH.P.K. (66%); Municipality of Tirana (34%)
- President: Refik Halili
- Manager: Dean Klafurić
- League: Kategoria Superiore
- 2025–26: Kategoria Superiore, 6th
- Website: kftirana.al
Home colours	Away colours	Third colours

Klubi i Futbollit Tirana is an Albanian professional football club based in the country's capital city, Tirana, that competes in the Kategoria Superiore, the top tier of Albanian football. The men's football club is part of the multi-disciplinary sports club SK Tirana, and is the most successful in Albania, having won 57 major domestic trophies. They are the only football club in Albania with two stars in their crest after winning their 20th league championship in 2003 (each star corresponds to ten championships), making them the first and only Albanian club to have achieved this feat to date. They play their home games at the Arena Kombëtare in Tirana.

The club was founded on 15 August 1920 as Sport Klub Tirana, but were renamed to Shoqata e Futbollit Agimi (English: Agimi Football Association) and had participated in all the top tier national championships in Albanian football through 2017. However, their ninth-place finish in the 2016–17 season resulted in the club's first-ever relegation to the Albanian First Division (second-tier).

The club competed under the name SK Tirana between 1927 and 1947, when the communist regime forcibly renamed the club 17 Nëntori Tirana, Puna Tirana and KS 17 Nëntori. In 1991 the club retook its pre-1947 name and was divided into two branches, the multi disciplinary SK Tirana and the football branch KF Tirana.

KF Tirana is the most successful Albanian team in European competitions, having progressed from the first round on 14 occasions (once directly by draw, without playing) since their European debut in the 1965–66 European Cup. They have reached Round of 16 in European competition four times, including three times in the European Cup (now Champions League) during the 1980s. The club also holds the historical record for highest ranked Albanian club according to IFFHS, having been ranked 31st in the world in 1987 following their 1986–87 campaign. KF Tirana is an ECA member.

== History ==
=== 1920–1937: Beginnings of Klubi i Futbollit Tirana ===
The first picture of the KF Tirana squad

Tirana was officially founded on 15 August 1920. The first coach was appointed Palok Nika. The first name of the club was Sportklub Tirona which was later changed into Futboll Klub Tirona. The team played their first official match in October at Shallvare against Juventus Shkodër.

Tirana played their first international match against Yugoslav team Crnogorac Cetinje from Montenegro in 1925. On 16 August 1927, which was the seventh anniversary of the formation of the Agimi Sports Association, the club's name changed into Sportklub Tirana, which would be commonly referred to as SK Tirana. On that day the president of the club was Teki Selenica.

in 1930, Tirana took part in the first officially recognised football competition held in Albania, organised by newly founded Albanian Football Association. The team dominated the tournament, reaching the final after winning five matches, drawing four and losing just one, to finish joint top, along with Skënderbeu Korçë, albeit with a slightly better goal difference. Tirana faced in the championship final Skënderbeu Korçë, who refused to play as a sign of protest against the bias of the competition and the Albanian Football Association towards Tirana. The club was named champion after the games were awarded 2–0.

The following season, the club introduced new players such as goalkeeper Vasfi Samimi, Sabit Çoku, Muhamet Agolli and Halim Begeja. The championship format changed as it divided the teams into two groups. Tirana was placed in Group A and managed to finish 1st after collecting five points from three matches. In the final against Group B winners Teuta Durrës, the team drew 1–1 in the first leg at home but managed a 3–0 win in the second one to retain the championship title.

Tirana continued to dominate the Albanian football even in the next season, despite the fact that the championship format was changed once again. In a group where every club would play each other twice and the winner would be decided by who finished top of the league, Tirana had it easy as they finished the championship unbeaten, winning five matches and drawing three, winning the title for the third consecutive year, which further cemented their place in history as the first club to dominate football in Albania. The club lost the title for the first time in history in 1933, finishing in a disappointing third place out of six, behind Bashkimi Shkodran and the winners Skënderbeu Korçë. It turned out to be a transition period as team bounced back firmly in the 1934 Championship, finishing five points ahead of runners-up Skënderbeu Korçë in a seven team format.

In the next years, Tirana managed to win the 1936 and 1937 championship, guided by ethnic-Albanian forward Riza Lushta who was named top goalscorer in both years. This was the last pre-World War II competition held by the Albanian Football Association as there was no championship held in 1938 and World War II broke out in 1939.

=== 1939–1947: War years ===
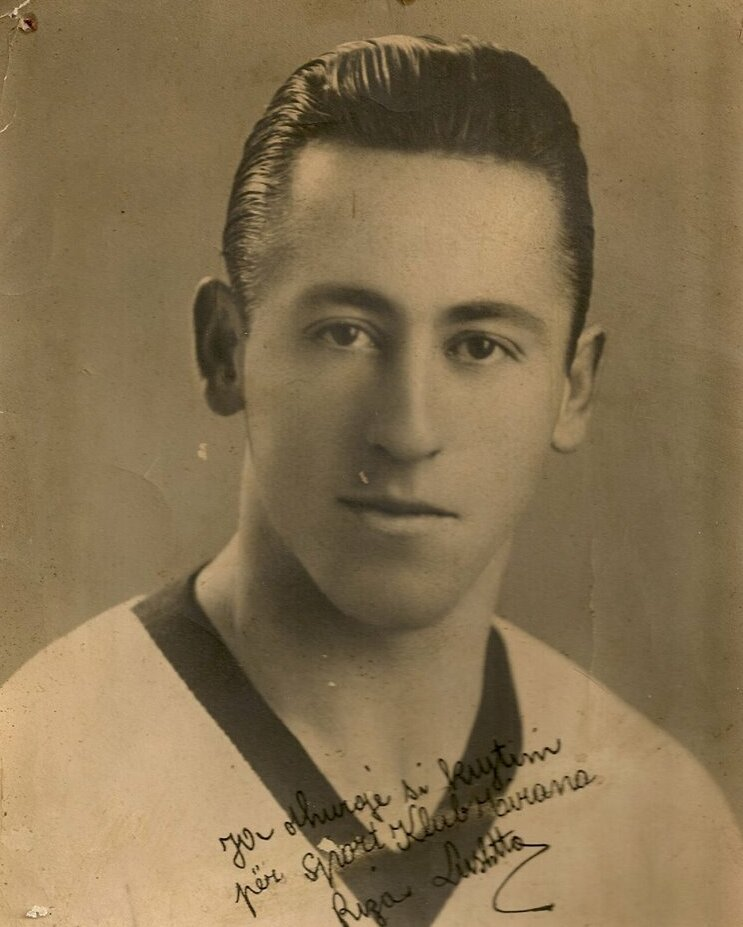
Riza Lushta Was one of the most distinguished players of Tirana in the 1930s

In 1939, Albania was under Italian invasion; Giovanni Giro, a loyal trustee of Foreign Minister Galeazzo Ciano, was in charge of organising the first football competition under Victor Emmanuel III, which was called Turneja Kombëtare E Footbollit Për Ndeshjet E Trofeut Të Liktorit (National Tour of Football for the Matches of the Lictor Trophy). Tirana participated in the tournament, eliminating 9–0 on aggregate Dragoj Pogradeci in the first round to reach the semi-finals. In the semi-final, the team played Skënderbeu Korçë, beating them 3–0 to reach the final against Vllaznia Shkodër. In the final played at the Shallvare field in the capital on 30 September 1939, Tirana won the trophy by winning 6–5.

A similar tournament was held in the next year by the fascist regime, this time in a group format where teams were divided into two groups based on geography location. Two of Tirana's most important players Kryeziu and Lushta left Albania for Italy to join Bari and Roma respectively. In the first match, Tirana drew 2–2 with Vllaznia Shkodër, and then won 3–0 at home against Elbasani. The rest of the campaign did not prove to be fruitful as Vllaznia finished top of the group ahead of Tirana and reached the championship finals, where they defeated Skënderbeu Korçë 11–1 on aggregate to win their first national championship, to this day unrecognised by the Albanian Federal Association.

The championship was not held in 1941 but returned in the following year, which also had three clubs from Kosovo. These clubs from Kosovo competed in the northern section along with the reigning champions Vllaznia Shkodër and Tirana competed in the new middle section group and the southern clubs competed in their own group. In a bizarre ruling, only players born between 1921 and 1925 were allowed to participate in the competition, meaning that only players between the ages of 17 and 22 were allowed to play. However, this rule was not followed by most clubs and senior players did participate in the competition. Tirana reached the semi-finals after winning 5–1 versus Elbasani and drawing 1–1 against Teuta Durrës. In the semi-final, the team faced Prizreni; the first leg ended in a 2–2 draw while the second one was won by Tirana 2–1. The team thus reached the final once again where they faced Vllaznia Shkodër on 29 June. The regular time ended in a 1–1 draw, leading the Italian referee Michele Carone then asked both sides to play extra time of two 15-minute halves, but Vllaznia declined. Two days after the final had been played the match was awarded 2–0 to Tirana along with the title.

The club won two out of the three National Championships that were held during World War II, but in March 2013, Albanian Football Association made a decision by refusing to recognise them, stating that they were not legitimate, since they weren't organised by the AFA, but by the fascist regime.

=== 1944–1957: Postwar period ===
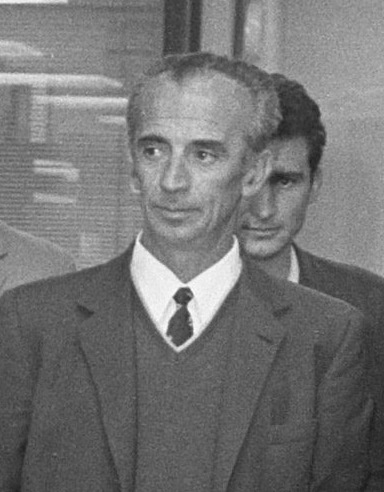
Myslym Alla, coached Tirana from 1956 to 1972.

Following the end of World War II, footballing activities resumed as they had done before the war under the guidance of the Albanian Football Association. In the championship of 1945, Tirana was placed in Group B. The team topped the group easily, collecting 16 points from 10 matches, thus reaching the final where they faced Vllaznia Shkodër once again. They lost both matches 2–1, thus missing the opportunity to win another championship.

Under communist regime led by dictator Enver Hoxha, Tirana would quickly become a victim as in early March 1946 the ruling communist Politburo had instructed the club to change its name to 17 Nëntori ("17 November") in honour of the Liberation of Tirana which took place on 17 November 1944. In the following decade, the club was subject to appalling treatment by the regime, and this was highlighted by the creation of a privilege system for the newly created communist backed teams Partizani Tirana and Dinamo Tirana.

The following decade would unroll in the same suffocating atmosphere, becoming even heavier after the foundation of two system-privileged teams that would follow the experiences of their sisters in the former USSR, former Yugoslavia, and the other eastern European countries: Partizani, the Defense Ministry team and Dinamo, the Internal Affairs Ministry team. Dozens of Tirana's talented players were "convinced", against their will, to play for either Partizani or Dinamo. As a result, "17 Nentori" struggled to stay at the top during the years 1947–57, however the team managed to gain some of the lost ground during the second part of the 1950s after replacing in part some of the first choice players of its line up.

=== 1958–1990: Decline and revival ===
From 1958 to 1964 Tirana kept on producing some good football and finishing the championship almost always at the third spot. These years were a prelude to what was about to happen later: Tirana reexperienced its pre-war glory spell under the services of the unforgettable coach Myslym Alla. At the end of the 28th national championship Tirana became champions of Albania more than twenty years after their last title.

The team repeated the success the year after, but this was an obvious challenge to Partizani's generals and Dinamo's secret service bosses.

==== 1967 title unjustly denied ====
It was 24 June 1967. Tirana and Partizani played their derby of the 19th round of 1966–67 Albanian First League. The match was not finished due to a fight breaking out with many Tirana and Partizani players throwing punches on the field. It was not a huge surprise to see the paper headlines the next morning: "Due to direct decision of the AFA, Tirana and Partizani forfeit the match 0:3, are deducted 3 points each and will thereafter lose by default remaining matches!" By forfeiting that match and losing the subsequent 3 remaining matches, Dinamo would automatically gain enough points to overtake Tirana and win the title.

==== Defiance ====
After this, Tirana won the championship two years in a row in style, losing only two matches in 1968 and only one during the 1969–70 season.

During the seventies, Tirana struggled hard to stay at the top, the best result being the second place and the worst the thirteenth. Yet the club won the national cup twice. The generation of older players came to the end of their careers and this could only mark the end of a highly successful era. However the unsuccessful spell would not last long this time. Tirana won the championship at the end of the 1981–82 season, and they went on to win the title three other times during the eighties, in 1984–85, 1987–88 and 1988–89 and the Albanian Cup in 1982–83, 1983–84 and 1985–86. The club was also successful in European club competitions, reaching there the round of 16 four times in the 1980s, alone in the European Cup three times. Many of the team's players made up the core of the Albania national football team, such as Agustin Kola, Arben Minga, Shkëlqim Muça and Mirel Josa.

=== 1991–2006: Return to success ===
In August 1991, less than a year following the fall of communism in Albania, Tirana regained its old name, and likewise the whole Albanian society, went through a period of profound changes. Almost all the best Albanian players left the country and went abroad looking for a richer team who could hire them. But it seems that the club simply could not stand being too long from the leading spots. The team returned to the winning ways by winning the Albanian Cup in the 1993–94 season, defeating 1–0 on aggregate Teuta Durrës. Shortly after, in January 1995, the team won also their first Albanian Supercup trophy, defeating 1–0 Teuta Durrës at Qemal Stafa Stadium. A couple of months later, they clinched their 15th championship by finishing 12 points ahead of the runner-up Teuta Durrës.

This championship was followed by another one in the 1995–96 season, as Tirana won it just one point ahead of Teuta Durrës once again. The team also clinched the cup in that season, completing the domestic double for the second time in history. Another domestic double followed in 1998–99 season. In the following years, Tirana continued to dominate the Albanian football, winning 10 out of the last 18 Albania's championships. The team also dominated in the domestic cups, adding to their trophy cabinet three Albanian Cups and five other Albanian Supercups.

=== 2011–2018: Change in ownership, decline and relegation ===
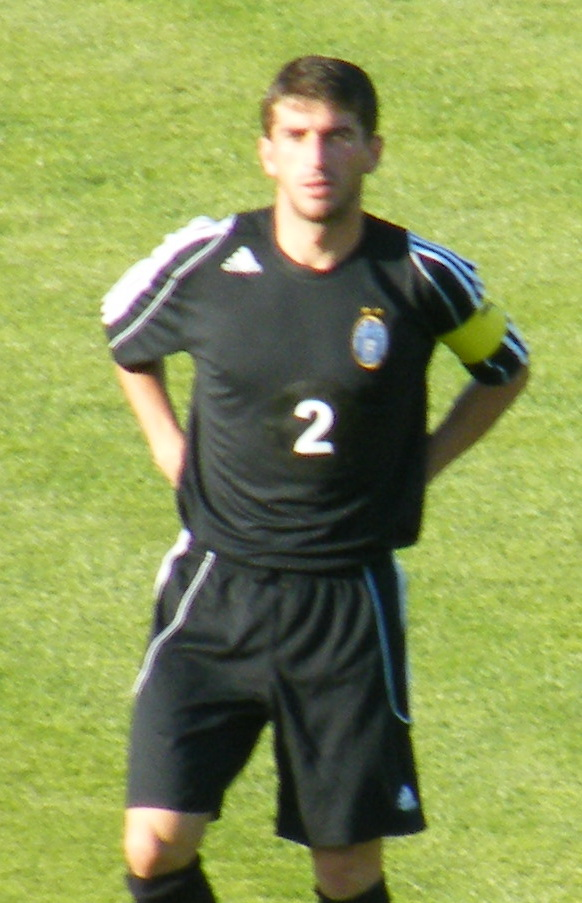
Elvis Sina, most-capped player in the history of Tirana with more than 500 appearances in all competitions

Following a successful 2006–07 campaign which saw the club win the Albanian Superliga comfortably, the team begun to struggle for results. They began the season by getting eliminated from the UEFA Champions League by NK Domžale. Despite winning the Albanian Supercup versus Besa Kavajë, Tirana managed only a 6th-place finish their worst finish since 1993. In cup, the team lost the final to Vllaznia Shkodër.

In the following season, Tirana bounced back; inspired by striker Migen Memelli, who went on to score 30 goals, Tirana managed to win the championship for the 24th time in history. In cup they reached another final, only to be defeated again, this time by Flamurtari Vlorë. In the next years, Tirana experiences mixed fortunes, being unable to win the championship but remaining on top in domestic cups, winning the Albanian Cup in 2010–11 and 2011–12, and three other Albanian Supercups in 2009, 2011 and 2012. There was also major controversies off the field between club's chief and president in the 2010–11 season, which led to a delay in paying the players' wages and even some players not receiving their wages.

On 12 October 2011, Municipality of Tirana city council voted through a unanimous decision to change the status of the club from a municipality owned to a shareholder own one, under the name KF Tirana Sh.A, with the municipality of Tirana initially holding a 100% stake in the club but with the possibility of any future private sponsors and donors to own stocks in the club.

Starting from 2013, Tirana entered in a period of disappointments. In the 2013–14 season, the team was seriously in risk of getting relegated for the first time in history. By the end of December 2013 the team was ranked in the last position with only 10 points from 13 matches, 7 points away from the safe zone. However, with Gugash Magani as manager and a strong transfer market, the team bounced back and eventually finished in 6th position, escaping the relegation only in the penultimate match. On 26 June 2014, the Tirana city council approved a proposal to give private donors a 66% stake in the club's assets for the next 18 years, which at the time fell in the hands of Refik Halili and Lulzim Morina, which enabled such donors to invest in players, facilities and youth teams.

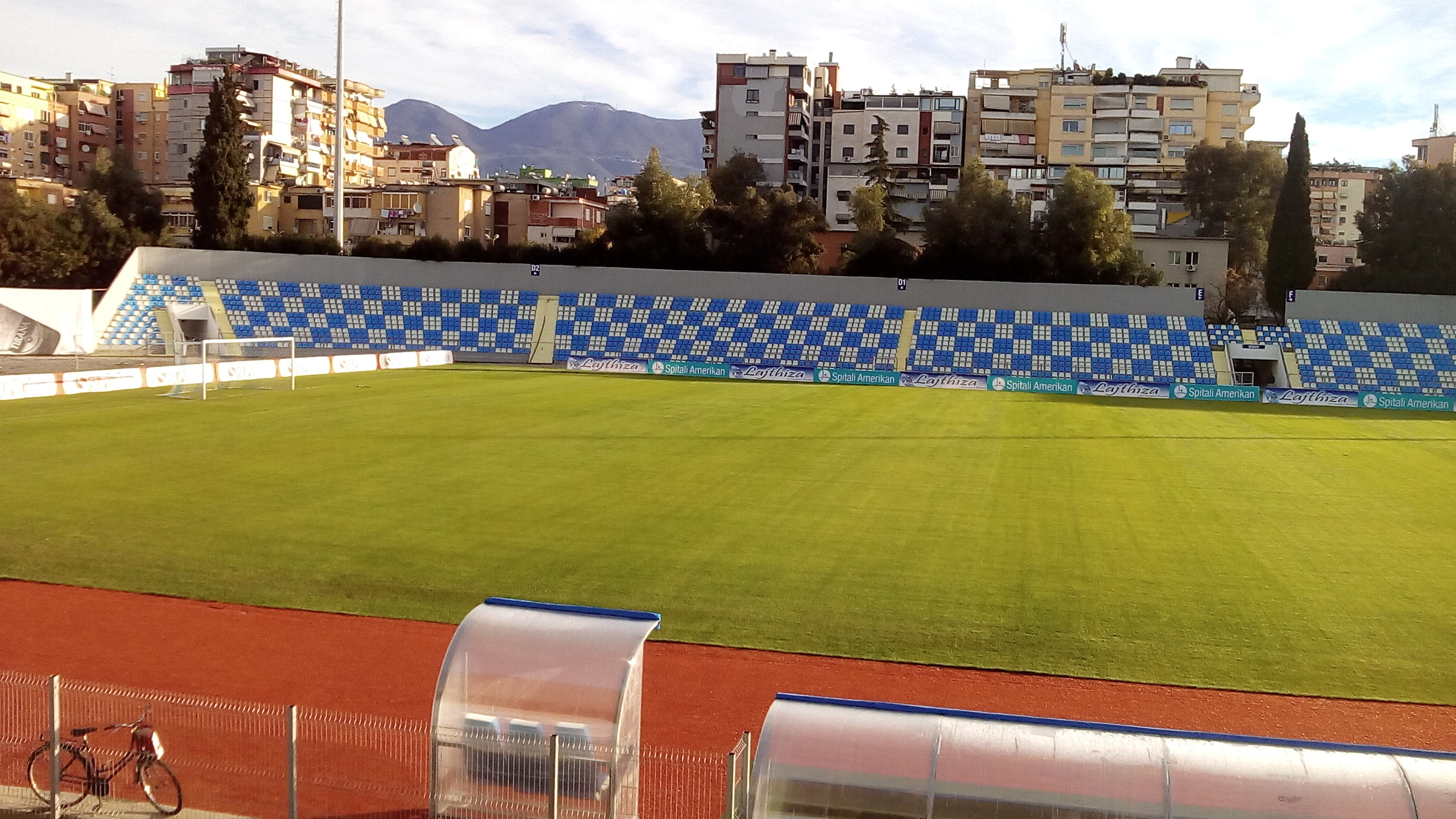
Selman Stërmasi Stadium was renovated between 2014 and 2015.

Tirana begun the 2014–15 season with high expectations, challenging for the title in the first part of the season. In the second part, however, the team declined and ultimately finished in 5th position. In cup, Tirana was controversially eliminated from Laçi in the semi-final 1–0 on aggregate. Laçi eventually won the final against Kukësi, leaving Tirana without Europa League football once again. The club was relegated during the 2016–17 season. From title contender halfway through the season, Tirana fell continuously to dramatically succumb to relegation for the first time in their history. Ilir Daja was sacked on 1 November following a goalless draw against Vllaznia Shkodër, and was replaced by the returned Mirel Josa. The club also broke the relationship with the fans after allowing with their lifetime rivals Partizani Tirana to play at Selman Stërmasi Stadium; they opposed such an agreement and subsequently abandoned the matches for the entire season as a result. Tirana then endured a 15 winless match streak before winning 2–0 against Korabi Peshkopi. Their relegation was officially confirmed on 27 May following a goalless draw versus fellow relegation strugglers Vllaznia Shkodër. In cup, Tirana did much better, winning their 16th trophy on 31 May after defeating 3–1 Skënderbeu Korçë at Elbasan Arena. This meant the return of Tirana in European competitions after five years.

Tirana retained most of their players ahead of the new season. The club appointed former Brazil international Zé Maria as the new manager. The team eliminated from the UEFA Europa League by Israel's Maccabi Tel Aviv In September 2017, Tirana won another trophy, their 11th Albanian Supercup after winning 1–0 against Kukësi. Winning two major domestic trophies and also participating in Europe, Tirana set an astonishing record by becoming the first and only Albanian First Division side to achieve this feat. In the league Tirana dominated with hammering results in either home or away matches. Club's goal of a quick promotion in Superliga was reached with three spare rounds to play. Tirana won their first ever Albanian First Division title on 16 May by winning 2–0 against the Group A winners Kastrioti Krujë.

=== 2019–present: 100th anniversary and return to top-flight as a powerhouse ===
Tirana won the 25th championship in the 2019–20 season which was also the club's 100th anniversary. It was the first title after 11 years. During the season the team recorded two wins against Partizani, ending the negative record of 18 winless matches against them; the 5–1 win in February 2020 was the biggest since 2005. Ndubuisi Egbo took charge of the team starting in the 13th matchday; he was highly praised for his work and also become the first African coach to win a league title in Europe. In cup, the team managed to reach the final but was defeated 2–0 by Teuta.

The Season 2021-2022 Champion Kategoria Superiore.

In the summer of 2020, Tirana reached the play-off of UEFA Europa League, becoming the second Albanian club to achieve this feat after Skënderbeu. They were eliminated by Switzerland's BSC Young Boys. During the domestic season, Tirana failed to defend the title and finished a disappointing 5th place. Coach Egbo was fired and replaced by Orges Shehi halfway through the season. In the next campaign, Tirana dominated the championship and won it for the 26th time in history. Aided by the attacking duo Taulant Seferi and Redon Xhixha, and players such as Ennur Totre, Vesel Limaj, Visar Bekaj, and Ardit Toli, Tirana secured the title with three rounds to spare.

== Grounds ==
=== Shallvare (1920–46) ===
The club's first home ground was the Shallvare, located in the centre of Tirana where today is the existing Shallvare block, acquired by the club prior to their formation in 1920. The also field served as an amusement centre for the youth of Tirana to enjoy, and it was a popular gathering place where various games were played during religious holidays. Before its use as a football ground the site was use by the Ottoman garrison as a playground, and in 1916 it served as a runway for the Austrian-Hungarian Imperial and Royal Aviation Troops. The club played their first game at the Shallvare in 1920 against a team made up of the occupying Austrian-Hungarians. In 1925 there were changing rooms built at the ground, and in the early 1930s there was an athletics track built around the football pitch. The administrator of the ground was the football referee, Besim Hamdiu (Qorri), who only had one assistant in the maintenance of the ground. The ground did not have a main stand or seating area for spectators, but rather a two storied building that was constructed in 1923 by a member of parliament Masar Këlliçi . The building stood 50 metres away from the football pitch and was located in line with the middle of the pitch, with its balcony facing the field and the Dajt mountains. The ground was also used for other sporting events as well as military parades, one of which the president and later king Ahmet Zogu attended in 1927. The ground was destroyed in 1951 and Soviet–style apartment blocks were built onto of it instead.

=== Qemal Stafa Stadium (1946–2015) ===
The home ground of KF Tirana is Selman Stërmasi Stadium, which is shared with city rivals Dinamo Tirana and Partizani Tirana. However, most derby and significant matches are played at the national team's Qemal Stafa Stadium; the stadium is also used if the Selman Stërmasi Stadium is unavailable as it is used by three different teams. The club has expressed its desire to rebuild the current Selman Stërmasi Stadium into a modern complex with around 15,000 to 20,000 seats. They want it to be Albania's first modern post-Communism stadium without an athletic track around the field, which they hope will provide more atmosphere and attract more fans. However, it has not yet been decided when this will be built but it is rumoured to be the club's 100th anniversary present in 2020.

=== Selman Stërmasi Stadium (1956–present) ===
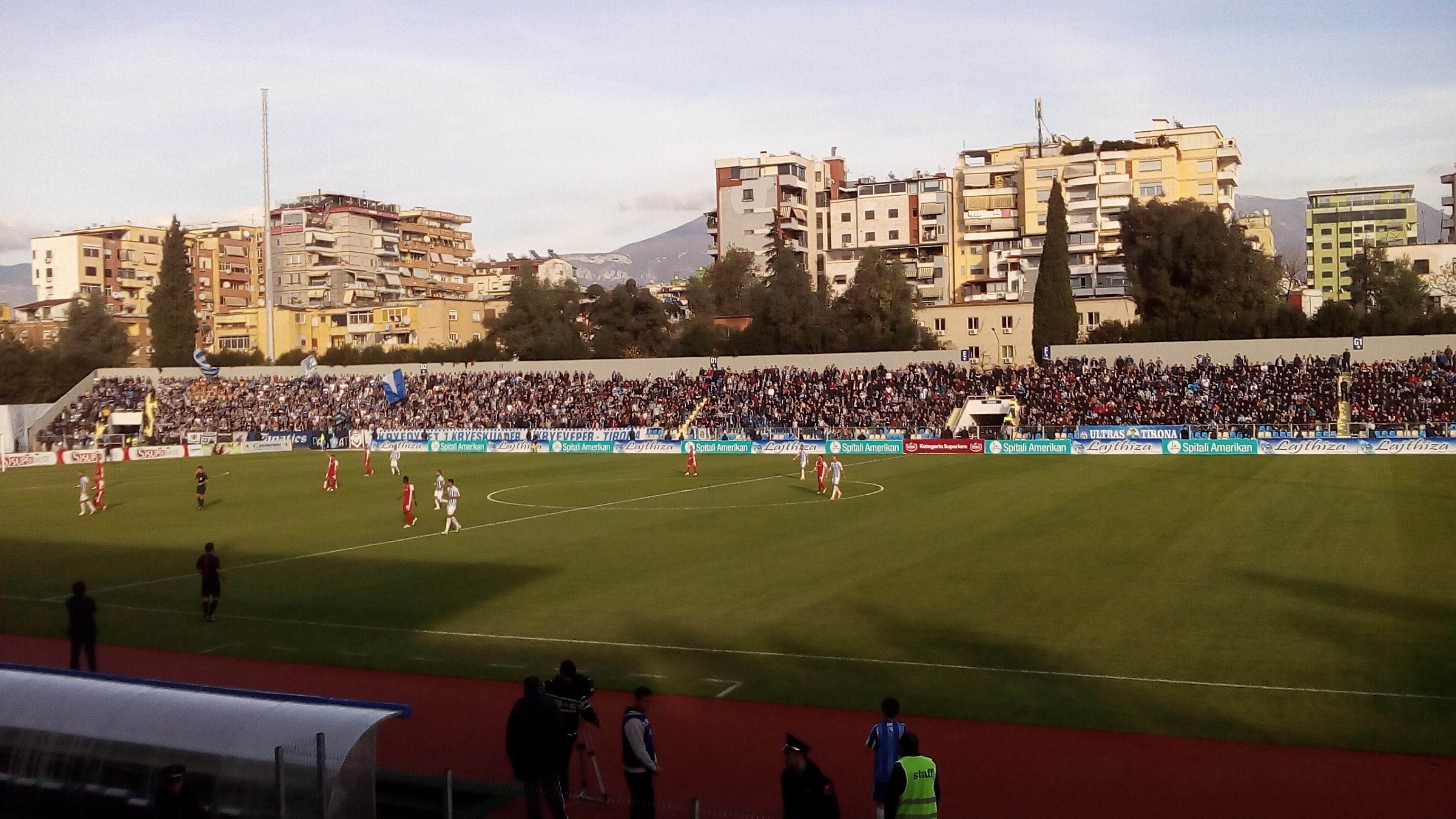
Selman Stërmasi Stadium in its inaugural match

KF Tirana plays most of its official and friendly games at the Selman Stërmasi Stadium in Tirana. The Selman Stërmasi Stadium was built in 1956 and was previously named the 'Dinamo' Stadium until 1991 when it was permanently given its new name. The Football Association of Albania and the club decided to name the stadium post mortem after the eminent KF Tirana player, coach and president, Selman Stërmasi.

The stadium has a capacity of 12,500 (8,400 seated). In December 2014, another phase of reconstruction was started, involving a new pitch, central main covered stand, central fans stand including two extra rows extension, broken or missing seats replacements/repairs, interior facilities, general lineaments and a shopping center just under central seated. The internal facilities include general repairs, a press conference room, journalists' corner and modern showers. The side fans stands will temporary be shut and covered by advertising boards. It is still unclear when will stadium scoreboard and clock be fitted.

The main parking area is located at the front of the stadium, which leads to the entrance. The whole external part of the stadium is surrounded by a 2.7 M (9 ft) rail fence.

=== Skënder Halili Complex ===
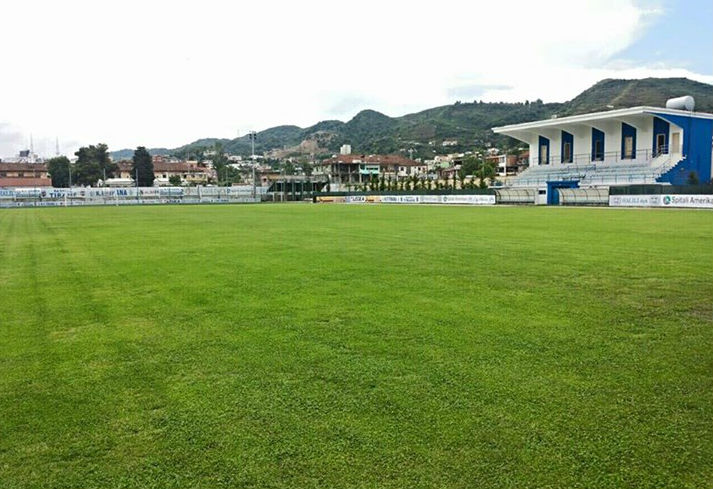
Skënder Halili complex after renovation in 2015.

The club's training ground is called the Skënder Halili Complex and it is located off Rruga e Kavajës, near the Birra Tirana factory. The training complex was posthumously named after Skënder Halili, who was one of the club's most notable associates, both during his playing career and after. The complex features a full sized natural grass football pitch, as well as a smaller astro turf fan along with dressing rooms used by senior team as well as some of the youth teams. In December 2014 work began on both the Skënder Halili Complex and the Selman Stërmasi Stadium in order to fully renovate these grounds to be used by the club, and at the training ground the training facilities were all improved which included the dressing rooms and even the single stand that holds a small number of spectators for those wishing to attend training sessions and even occasional friendlies that are played at the ground.

== Supporters ==
Tirona Fanatics
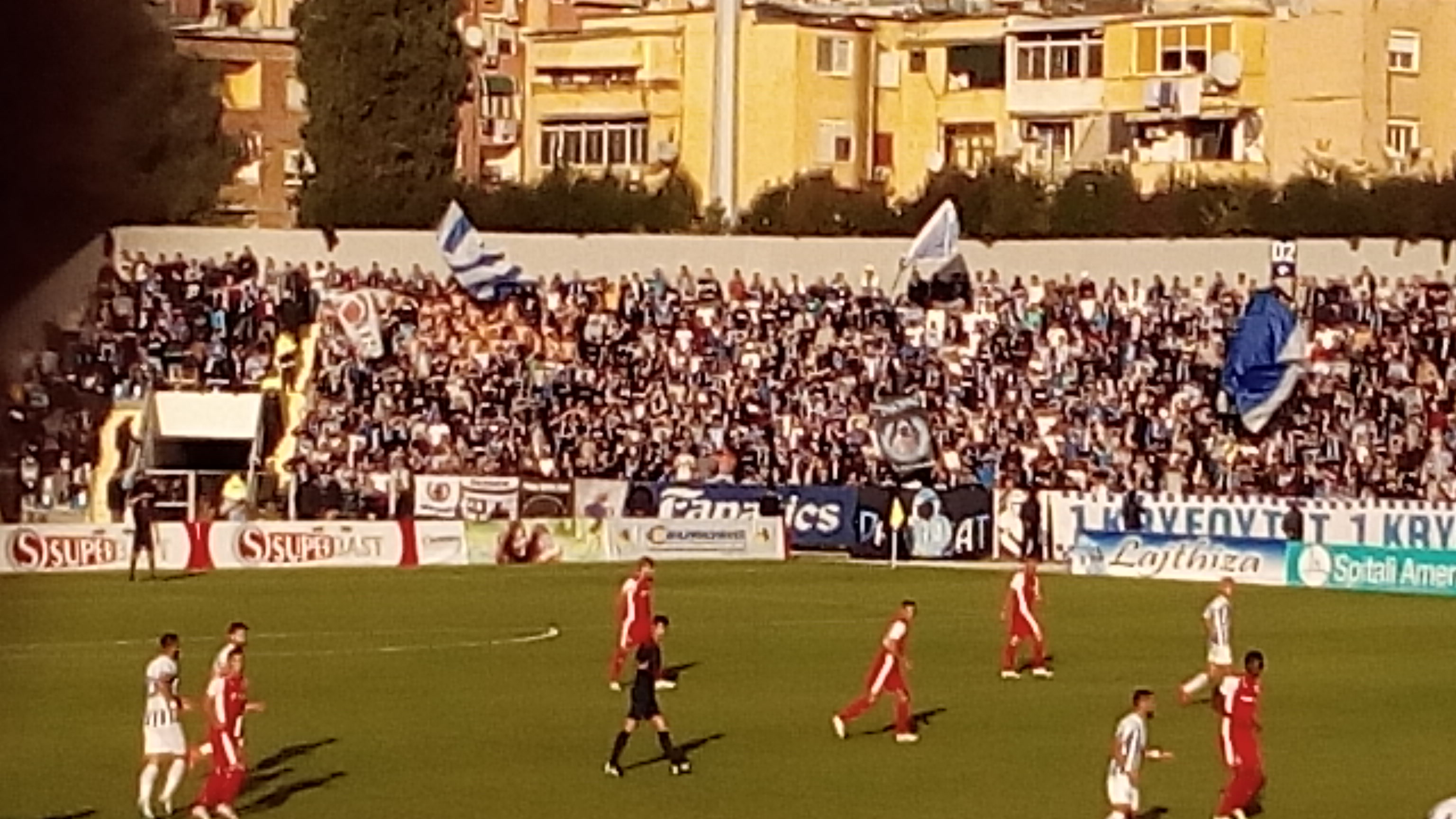
- Abbreviation: TF06
- Established: 8 January 2006
- Type: Supporters' group
- Club: KF Tirana
- Motto: Tirona e zemrës (Tirona of the heart)
- Headquarters: Tirana, Albania
- Affiliations: Shvercerat

Tirana is considered to be one of the most supported football clubs in Albania, and its supporters also formed the first Ultras group in the country in 1986 called Ultras Tirona. The group was forced to operate illegally as the communist regime did not allow such organised groups to function. However, despite this, its supporters used games as an outlet to show their dissent against the regime in place and following the fall of communism in Albania they became more organised and attracted more supporters in the late 90s and early 2000s. During the mid-2000s, younger supporters began to emerge on the scene and felt that the older Ultras Tirona did not entirely represent them, which led to the younger supporters forming a new Ultras group called the Tirona Fanatics on 8 January 2006.They are now the best ultras in Albania Tirona Fanatics are widely regarded as a right wing tifo-group, whereas Ultras Guerrils are mostly associated with the left due to their history. The group quickly rose in membership and became the most organised supporters group in Albania, following Tirana home and away, including European games. On 20 May 2015 the majority of the founding members of Tirona Fanatics decided to hand over the management of the group to younger supporters. The group has partnerships withMacedonian group Shvercerat of FK Shkupi. KF Tirana has another Ultras group called "Capital Crew" which offer a spectacular atmosphere when they are in the stadium.

=== Rivalries ===
Tirana have three main rivals. Vllaznia Shkodër, the oldest derby in the country, with the matches between them called the All-time Albanian derby. The other rivalries are the Tirana derbies with Dinamo Tirana and Partizani Tirana. However, since the 2010s, they have developed a fierce rivalry with Skënderbeu Korçë since the latter side's rise to prominence.

=== Identity ===
The official coat of arms of KF Tirana has undergone several changes over the years. After 1990, the Clock Tower was placed on the coat of arms, which is one of the most important monuments of the city.The last change of the coat of arms took place in 2020, the year the club celebrated its 100th anniversary. The club a few months ago announced a competition for the new crest, which would be chosen by fans' works. The winner was announced in February 2020. The new coat of arms bore similarities to the current one; The Clock Tower was moved to the left, as well as two zeros were added to its wings, while below it read 1920–2020, to symbolize the 100th anniversary.The club announced that it would use this crest for the whole of 2020.

=== The Colors ===
The traditional colors of KF Tirana have been white and blue.These two colors have also been dominant in the team's jerseys, especially in home games. Other colors, such as black and gray, have been used in cases where the team has played with the second or third jerseys. The goalkeeper jersey has been in different colors, such as yellow, blue, grey, green or black.

== Players ==
=== Current squad ===
As of 1 July 2026

Note: Flags indicate national team as defined under FIFA eligibility rules; some limited exceptions apply. Players may hold more than one non-FIFA nationality.

No.	Pos.	Nation	Player
2	DF	ARG	Luciano Vera
3	DF	GEQ	Basilio Ndong
5	DF	GAM	Joseph Colley
6	DF	ALB	Ardit Krymi
7	MF	SVK	Patrik Myslovič
8	MF	ALB	Serxho Vogli
9	FW	CRO	Tomislav Kiš
10	FW	CRC	Freddy Álvarez
11	FW	MKD	Erdon Daci
12	GK	ALB	Klajdi Kuka
15	DF	KOS	Leonat Vitija
17	FW	GER	Etienne Tare
19	FW	ALB	Redon Xhixha (captain)

No.	Pos.	Nation	Player
20	MF	ALB	Aimar Bami
22	MF	ALB	Olti Qerimaj
23	FW	KOS	Bernard Berisha
24	FW	ALB	Serxho Prendi
27	MF	KOS	Drilon Hazrollaj (on loan from Rapid București)
28	MF	ALB	Mateo Maçi
31	MF	ESP	Hugo Fresneda
33	MF	ALB	Ermal Meta
55	DF	MKD	Bojan Ilievski
95	DF	CRO	Patrick Stanić
96	GK	ALB	Klajdi Hasani
97	GK	KOS	Visar Bekaj (vice–captain)
99	GK	ALB	Rejan Çali

=== Out on loan ===
Note: Flags indicate national team as defined under FIFA eligibility rules; some limited exceptions apply. Players may hold more than one non-FIFA nationality.

No. / Pos. / Nation / Player; — / DF / ALB / Leon Misja (at Besëlidhja Lezhë until 30 June 2027)	No. / Pos. / Nation / Player

=== Other players under contract ===
As of 10 July 2026

Note: Flags indicate national team as defined under FIFA eligibility rules; some limited exceptions apply. Players may hold more than one non-FIFA nationality.

No. / Pos. / Nation / Player	No. / Pos. / Nation / Player

=== Retired numbers ===
Note: Flags indicate national team as defined under FIFA eligibility rules; some limited exceptions apply. Players may hold more than one non-FIFA nationality.

No.	Pos.	Nation	Player
12	12	ALB	Tirona Fanatics (since the start of 2014–15 season)

=== Other clubs ===
==== Tirana B ====
Klubi i Futbollit Tirana B is an Albanian football club based in Tirana. It was founded in 1932, but was dissolved before it was refounded again on 22 January 2013.

==== Tirana U-21 ====
KF Tirana U-21 is an Albanian football club based in Tirana. It was founded in 2019.

==== Reserves and academy ====
The KF Tirana Reserves and Academy (Albanian: Klubi i Futbollit Tirana Rezervat dhe Akademia) are the reserve team of KF Tirana, They play in the North section of the Albanian U-19 Superliga and Albanian U-17 Superliga.

== Honours ==
Tirana are the most successful and decorated club in Albania, having won 26 league titles, a national record. The club's first trophy was also the first Albanian National Championship, held in 1930, which was also the first official football competition in the country. The club also holds the record for the most Albanian Cups (16) and Albanian Supercups (12). The club's most recent trophy was the 2022 Albanian Supercup won on 7 December 2022.

Type	Competition	Titles	Seasons
Domestic (58)	Kategoria Superiore	26*	1930, 1931, 1932, 1934, 1936, 1937, 1939**, 1942**, 1964–65, 1965–66, 1967***, 1968, 1969–70, 1981–82, 1984–85, 1987–88, 1988–89, 1994–95, 1995–96, 1996–97, 1998–99, 1999–00, 2002–03, 2003–04, 2004–05, 2006–07, 2008–09, 2019–20, 2021–22
Domestic (58)	Kategoria e Parë	1	2017–18
Domestic (58)	Kupa e Shqipërisë	16	1938–39, 1962–63, 1975–76, 1976–77, 1982–83, 1983–84, 1985–86, 1993–94, 1995–96, 1998–99, 2000–01, 2001–02, 2005–06, 2010–11, 2011–12, 2016–17
Domestic (58)	Superkupa e Shqipërisë	12	1994, 2000, 2002, 2003, 2005, 2006, 2007, 2009, 2011, 2012, 2017, 2022
Domestic (58)	Double	3	1939, 1995–96, 1998–99
Minor	Taçi Oil Cup	1	2008

- Record
  - Tirana have won two more championships played during seasons 1939 and 1942. However, F$HF have not yet officially recognised them.
    - Tirana became champion in 1967 but was punished together with Partizani by not playing the next three matches due to a conflict between the players in the locker room. This was considered absurd at the time that the title was taken away from Tirana and given to Dinamo, a title that today UEFA recognizes Tirana and the F$HF Dinamo.

== Records and statistics ==
=== Domestic ===
- Biggest ever home league victory:

Tirana 11–0 Flamurtari Vlorë (5 July 1936)
Tirana 11–0 Besëlidhja Lezhë (6 June 1937)
Tirana 11–0 Erzeni (1960)

- Biggest ever home league defeat: Tirana 0–6 Vllaznia Shkodër (1947)
  Tirana 0-6 Skënderbeu Korçë (1947)
- Biggest ever away league victory: Elbasani 2–9 Tirana (12 June 1932)
  Pogradeci 1–8 Tirana (1953)
- Biggest ever away league defeat: Besa Kavajë 7-1 Tirana (1991)
- Most league appearances: (Albania) Elvis Sina (392)
- Most league goals: (Albania) Indrit Fortuzi (152)
- Most points in a season: 84 (2004–05)
- Fewest points in a season: 7 (1940)
- Most wins in a season: 26 (2004–05)
- Fewest wins in a season: 3 (1931, 1933, 1940, 1942)
- Most draws in a season: 18 (2024–25)
- Fewest draws in a season: 0 (1939, 1946)
- Most losses in a season: 14 (2025–26)
- Fewest losses in a season: 0 (1932, 1936, 1937, 1939, 1942)
- Best Goal Differential: +66 (1936)
- Worst Goal Differential: -10 (2025–26)

=== Europe ===
- Highest stage reached in Champions League: Round of 16 (1982–83, 1988–89, 1989–90)
- Highest stage reached in Europa League: Play-Off (2020–21)
- Highest stage reached in Conference League: 2QR (2022–23), (2023–24)
- Highest stage reached in Cup Winners' Cup: Round of 16 (1986–87)
- Highest stage reached in Balkans Cup: Runners-up (1981–83)
- Biggest ever European home victory: Tirana 5–0 (Malta) Sliema Wanderers (Sept 27, 1989)
- Biggest ever European home defeat: Tirana 2–6 NK Croatia Zagreb (24 July 1996)
- Biggest ever European away victory: (Belarus) Gomel 0–2 Tirana (14 July 2004)
  (Georgia (country)) Dinamo Tbilisi 0-2 Tirana (19 August 2020)
- Biggest ever European away defeat: (Norway) Aalesund 5–0 Tirana (26 July 2012)
- Most European appearances: (Albania) Elvis Sina (31)
- Most European goals: (Albania) Indrit Fortuzi (10)

=== Players ===
Most appearances

Appearances in competitive matches Below is the list with top ten players with most appearances in all competitions for KF Tirana.

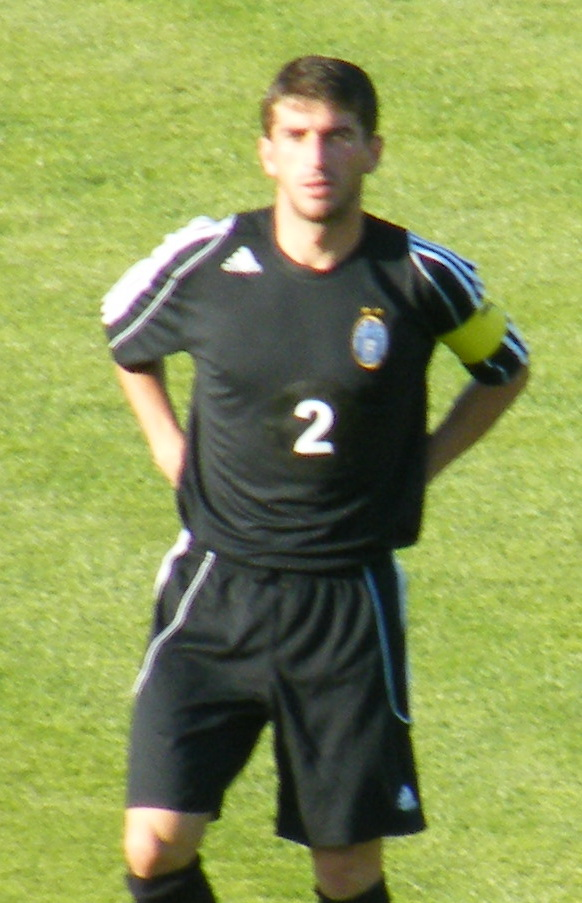
Elvis Sina is one of the highest match players for the club.

Rank	Player	Years	Match	Goals
1	(Albania) Elvis Sina	1996–2006; 2007–2008; 2009–2014	392	8
2	(Albania) Arben Minga	1975–1991; 1994–1997	387	136
3	(Albania) Blendi Nallbani	1990–1991; 1992–1993; 1994–2001; 2004–2011	327	1
4	(Albania) Nevil Dede	1994–2004; 2006–2007; 2009–2010	299	30
5	(Albania) Agustin Kola	1980–1991; 1994–1997	298	133
6	(Albania) Erando Karabeci	2009–2020; 2025–	275	10
7	(Albania) Erjon Hoxhallari	2011–2014; 2015–2022; 2023–2024	262	11
8	(Albania) Mirel Josa	1980–1991	253	40
9	(Albania) Rezart Dabulla	1998–2006; 2008–2013	245	9
10	(Albania) Ervin Bulku	1998–2006; 2014–2016	235	15

Most goals

Rank	Player	Years	Goals	Match
1	(Albania) Indrit Fortuzi	1993–1998; 2000–2005; 2007–2008	152	210
2	(Albania) Arben Minga	1971–1990; 1994–1997	136	387
3	(Albania) Agustin Kola	1980–1991; 1994–1997	133	298
4	(Albania) Shkelqim Muca	1978–1988	88	192
5	(Albania) Petrit Dibra	1970–1980	70	187
6	(Albania) Devi Muka	1998–1999; 2003–2010	61	201
7	(Albania) Skënder Hyka	1963–1974	60	157
8	(Albania) Mahir Halili	2000–2005	46	133
9	(Albania) Pavllo Bukoviku	1957–1958; 1961–1971	45	147
10	(Albania) Hamdi Salihi	2005–2007	42	52

Kategoria Superiore Golden Boot

List of Kategoria Superiore top scorers (Kategoria Superiore top scorers).

Season	Player	Goals	Matches
1930	(Albania) Rexhep Maçi (Albania) Emil Hajnali	3	3
1932	(Albania) Haki Korça	4	3
1934	(Albania) Mark Gurashi	12	5
1936	(Albania) Riza Lushta	11	5
1937	(Albania) Riza Lushta	25	5
1978–79	(Albania) Petrit Dibra	14	26
1984–85	(Albania) Arben Minga	13	17
1987–88	(Albania) Agustin Kola	18	33
1988–89	(Albania) Agustin Kola	19	32
2000–01	(Albania) Indrit Fortuzi	31	25
2001–02	(Albania) Indrit Fortuzi	24	24
2002–03	(Albania) Mahir Halili	20	22
2005–06	(Albania) Hamdi Salihi	29	35
2006–07	(Albania) Vioresin Sinani	23	29
2008–09	(Albania) Migen Memelli	22	29
2021–22	(Albania) Taulant Seferi	19	35
2022–23	(Kosovo) Florent Hasani	16	35

Most championships won

(4 times or more)

#	Champion	Times	Seasons
1	Nevil Dede	8	1995, 1996, 1997, 1999, 2000, 2003, 2004, 2007
	Blendi Nallbani	8	1995, 1996, 1997, 1999, 2000, 2005, 2007, 2009
3	Krenar Alimehmeti	7	1985, 1988, 1989, 1996, 1997, 1999, 2000
	Eldorado Merkoçi	7	1995, 1996, 1997, 1999, 2003, 2004, 2005
5	Adem Karapici	6	1930, 1931, 1932, 1934, 1936, 1937
	Arben Minga	6	1982, 1985, 1988, 1989, 1995, 1996
	Agustin Kola	6	1982, 1985, 1988, 1989, 1995, 1997
	Ardian Mema	6	1989, 1995, 1996, 1997, 1999, 2000
	Sokol Bulku	6	1996, 1997, 1999, 2000, 2003, 2004
	Elvis Sina	6	1997, 1999, 2000, 2003, 2004, 2005
	Devi Muka	6	1999, 2003, 2004, 2005, 2007, 2009
	Rezart Dabulla	6	1999, 2000, 2003, 2004, 2005, 2009
	Ervin Bulku	6	1999, 2000, 2003, 2004, 2005, 2007
	Isli Hidi	6	1999, 2000, 2003, 2004, 2005, 2007
15	Mark Gurashi	5	1930, 1931, 1934, 1936, 1937
	Rudolf Gurashi	5	1930, 1931, 1934, 1936, 1937
	Emil Hajnali	5	1930, 1931, 1932, 1936, 1937
	Florian Riza	5	1988, 1989, 1996, 1997, 2000
	Indrit Fortuzi	5	1995, 1996, 1997, 2003, 2004
	Alpin Gallo	5	1995, 1996, 1997, 1999, 2000
	Alban Tafaj	5	1999, 2000, 2003, 2004, 2005
	Saimir Patushi	5	2003, 2004, 2005, 2007, 2009
23	Selman Stërmasi	4	1930, 1931, 1932, 1934
	Hysen Kusi	4	1930, 1931, 1932, 1936
	Pavllo Bukoviku	4	1965, 1966, 1968, 1970
	Luigj Bytyçi	4	1965, 1966, 1968, 1970
	Fatmir Frashëri	4	1965, 1966, 1968, 1970
	Skënder Hyka	4	1965, 1966, 1968, 1970
	Bahri Ishka	4	1965, 1966, 1968, 1970
	Ali Mema	4	1965, 1966, 1968, 1970
	Osman Mema	4	1965, 1966, 1968, 1970
	Niko Xhaçka	4	1965, 1966, 1968, 1970
	Shkëlqim Muça	4	1982, 1985, 1988, 1989
	Mirel Josa	4	1982, 1985, 1988, 1989
	Leonard Liti	4	1982, 1985, 1988, 1989
	Bedri Omuri	4	1982, 1985, 1988, 1989
	Bujar Sharra	4	1982, 1985, 1988, 1989
	Anesti Stoja	4	1985, 1988, 1989, 1995
	Ansi Agolli	4	2003, 2004, 2005, 2009
	Gentjan Hajdari	4	2003, 2004, 2005, 2007

== KF Tirana statistics in Kategoria Superiore ==
Since the Kategoria Superiore began in 1930, KF Tirana have played 2096 Superliga matches, scored 3438 goals and conceded 1873. The club has collected so far 3132 points, won 1079 games, drawn 543 and lost 474. The club's goal difference is +1565 and the winning difference is +605.

Historical	Goals	Wins	Draws	Losses	+/-Goals	+/- Wins	Points	Matches
TOTAL	3438–1873	1079	543	474	+1565	+605	3132	2096

Data correct up to the end of the 2022–23 season.

=== Recent seasons ===
Season	Division	Pos.	Pl.	W	D	L	GS	GA	P	Cup	Supercup	Europe		Top scorer
1993–94	Kampionati Shqiptar	2nd	26	13	6	7	36	16	33	W	W	—	—	(Albania) Indrit Fortuzi 11
1994–95	Kampionati Shqiptar	1st	30	19	6	5	57	27	44	RU	—	UCW	1QR	(Albania) Indrit Fortuzi 18
1995–96	Kampionati Shqiptar	1st	34	19	10	5	52	22	55	W	—	UCup	1QR	(Albania) Saimir Malko 9
1996–97	Kampionati Shqiptar	1st	22	14	4	4	40	9	46	SR	—	UCup	1QR	(Albania) Alban Bushi 9
1997–98	Kampionati Shqiptar	2nd	34	19	8	7	54	19	65	QF	—	—	—	(Albania) Indrit Fortuzi 15
1998–99	Kampionati Shqiptar	1st	30	18	7	5	48	20	61	W	—	UCL	1QR	(Albania) Indrit Fortuzi 9
1999–00	Kampionati Shqiptar	1st	26	16	4	6	40	14	52	QF	W	UCL	1QR	(Albania) Anesti Vito 11
2000–01	Kampionati Shqiptar	2nd	26	16	6	4	56	13	54	W	—	UCL	1QR	(Albania) Indrit Fortuzi 38
2001–02	Kampionati Shqiptar	2nd	26	19	5	2	52	15	62	W	W	UCup	1QR	(Albania) Indrit Fortuzi 31
2002–03	Kampionati Shqiptar	1st	26	19	3	4	57	18	60	SF	W	UCup	1QR	(Albania) Mahir Halili 20
2003–04	Kategoria Superiore	1st	36	24	8	4	90	36	80	SF	RU	UCL	2QR	(Albania) Indrit Fortuzi 20
2004–05	Kategoria Superiore	1st	36	26	6	4	82	32	84	RU	W	UCL	2QR	(Albania) Altin Rraklli 20
2005–06	Kategoria Superiore	2nd	36	17	11	8	54	33	62	W	W	UCL	2QR	(Albania) Hamdi Salihi 29
2006–07	Kategoria Superiore	1st	33	22	6	5	64	33	72	QF	W	UCup	2QR	(Albania) Vioresin Sinani 23
2007–08	Kategoria Superiore	6th	33	14	7	12	46	36	49	RU	—	UCL	1QR	(Albania) Klodian Duro 16
2008–09	Kategoria Superiore	1st	33	19	11	3	58	27	68	RU	W	—	—	(Albania) Migen Memelli 23
2009–10	Kategoria Superiore	3rd	33	15	7	11	38	32	52	THR	—	UCL	2QR	(Albania) Gjergji Muzaka 10
2010–11	Kategoria Superiore	5th	33	11	11	11	42	31	44	W	W	UEL	2QR	(Croatia) Pero Pejić 16
2011–12	Kategoria Superiore	3rd	26	16	5	5	33	21	53	W	W	UEL	2QR	(Albania) Bekim Balaj 13
2012–13	Kategoria Superiore	5th	26	12	7	7	30	23	43	SR	—	UEL	2QR	(Albania) Gilman Lika 9
2013–14	Kategoria Superiore	6th	33	14	8	11	36	31	50	SR	—	—	—	(Albania) Mario Morina 5 (Brazil) Gilberto Fortunato 5
2014–15	Kategoria Superiore	4th	36	21	8	7	47	27	71	SF	—	—	—	(Albania) Elis Bakaj 13
2015–16	Kategoria Superiore	5th	36	13	14	9	37	25	53	QF	—	—	—	(Albania) Elis Bakaj 14
2016–17	Kategoria Superiore	↓9th	36	8	15	13	29	32	39	W	—	—	—	(Albania) Afrim Taku 9
2017–18	Kategoria e Parë	1st	26	21	4	1	66	13	64	QF	W	UEL	1QR	(Albania) Bedri Greca 14
2018–19	Kategoria Superiore	7th	36	12	11	13	44	35	47	RU	—	—	—	(Albania) Edon Hasani 13
2019–20	Kategoria Superiore	1st	36	21	7	8	67	35	70	RU	—	—	—	(England) Michael Ngoo 14
2020–21	Kategoria Superiore	5th	36	15	13	8	41	26	58	SR	RU	UCL; UEL	2QR; PO	(Albania) Idriz Batha 9
2021–22	Abissnet Superiore	1st	36	22	7	7	64	27	73	SR	—	—	—	(Albania) Taulant Seferi 19
2022–23	Abissnet Superiore	2nd	36	20	7	9	56	33	67	RU	W	UCL; UCO	1QR; 2QR	(Kosovo) Florent Hasani 16
2023–24	Abissnet Superiore	5th	36	13	11	12	56	49	50	SF	—	UCO	2QR	(Albania) Kristal Abazaj 11
2024–25	Abissnet Superiore	8th	36	7	18	11	43	44	39	R16	—	UCO	1QR	(France) Walid Jarmouni 13
2025–26	Abissnet Superiore	6th	36	11	11	14	36	46	44	QF	—	—	—	(Cameroon) Serge Tabekou 9
2026–27	Abissnet Superiore										—	—	—	

=== Record transfers ===
Rank	Player	To	Fee	Year
1.	(Albania) Redon Xhixha	(Azerbaijan) Qarabag FK	€550k	2023
2.	(Albania) Taulant Seferi	(Ukraine) Vorskla Poltava	€500k	2023
3.	(Albania) Ernest Muci	(Poland) Legia Warszawa	€500k	2021
4.	(Liberia) Emmanuel Ernest	(Algeria) USM Alger	€500k	2025
5.	(Republic of the Congo) Merveil Ndockyt	(Spain) Getafe FC	€400k	2018

== Divisional movements ==
Series	Years	Last	Promotions	Relegations
Kategoria Superiore	87	2026–27	2 (1930, 2018–19)	▼1 (2016–17)
Kategoria e Parë	1	2017–18	▲1 (2017–18)	▼0 (–)

== KF Tirana in Europe ==
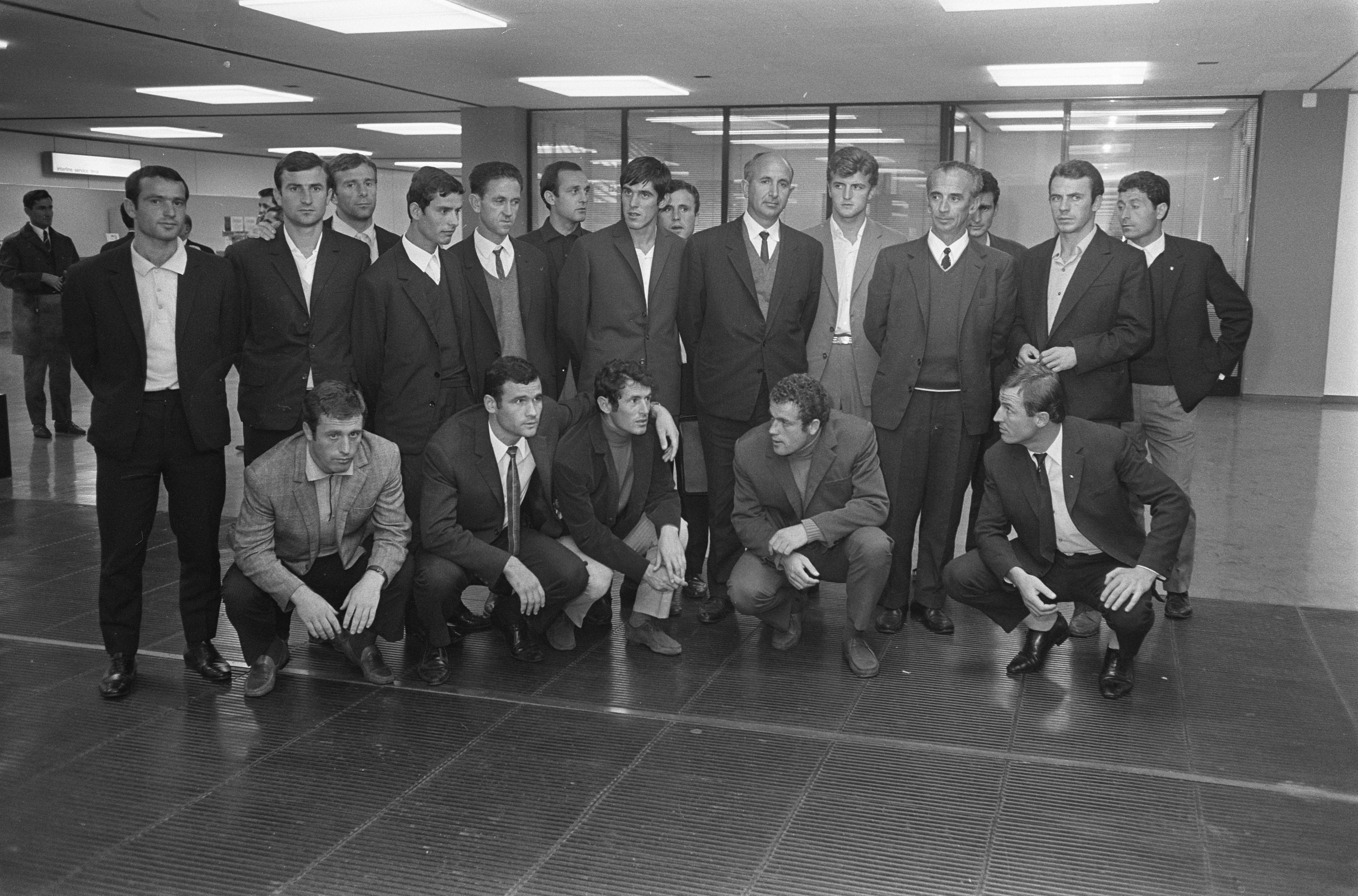
KF Tirana (September 1970)

In addition to being the leader team in all domestic competitions, KF Tirana have also given the best performances in Europe among Albanian squads winning 14 ties in Europe (including once directly by draw, without playing).

They reached Round of 16 in European Competitions four times, of which three times in the European Cup (now Champions League) alone in the 1980s, making it the Albanian team to have progressed farthest in any European competition.

White and blues hold the all-time record for the highest IFFHS ranking of an Albanian football club, being ranked as high as 31st in the world in 1987, as result of good results preceded 1986–87.

In their European path, Tirana have played against "big guns" such as: Ajax, Bayern Munich, etc. Drawn against teams such as Dinamo București, Ferencváros, CSKA Sofia, Young Boys, Utrecht, Dinamo Zagreb, IFK Göteborg, Malmö FF, Standard Liège, Maccabi Tel Aviv F.C., Red Star Belgrade, Besiktas JK etc.

In one of the few team's good performances (the 2004–05 season) after having passed FC Gomel of Belarus in the first round 2:1 on aggregate, KF Tirana played against Ferencváros in the second round. Having lost the first leg 3–2 at home, Tirana led 1–0 in Budapest; however, they were unable to score the one extra goal they needed, having missed a penalty and hit the woodwork twice, and were eliminated on away goals, the tie finishing 3–3 on aggregate.

Another good performance was reaching the play-off stage in Europa League 2020-21. Following a 2–0 away victory against Dinamo Tbilisi in the first round of Champions League, they were eliminated by Red Star in the following round, losing 0–1 in Air Albania Stadium and moving to Europa League third round (lucky draw). Which saw Tirana play in play-off against BSC Young Boys in Bern, where they were defeated 3–0 and failed to qualify for the group stage.

Tirana reached the first qualification in the UEFA Conference League in the first round against the Georgians of FC Dinamo Batumi with a 2-1 victory in Batumi after a 1-1 draw in Tirana with a goal by Regi Lushkja, while in the second round they faced the Turkish giants Beşiktaş J.K. where they won both games 3-1 in Istanbul at Beşiktaş Stadium and 2-0 in Tirana at Air Albania Stadium

== European performance table ==
=== By competition ===
As of 18 December 2025

Competition	P	W	D	L	GF	GA	GD	Win %
Balkans Cup	18	5	4	9	23	21	+2	27.78
UEFA Champions League	40	9	3	28	37	65	−28	22.50
UEFA Europa League as (Uefa Cup)	28	5	7	16	18	53	−35	17.86
UEFA Cup Winners' Cup	10	4	1	5	9	15	−6	40.00
UEFA Europa Conference League	8	1	2	5	7	13	−6	12.50
Total	104	24	17	63	94	167	−73	23.08

Season	Competition	Round	Country	Opposition	Home	Away	Aggregate
1964–66	Balkans Cup	Group B	(Bulgaria)	Cherno More Varna	0–0	0–1	2nd
1964–66	Balkans Cup	Group B	(Turkey)	Beşiktaş	2–0	1–1	2nd
1964–66	Balkans Cup	Group B	(Romania)	Rapid București	1–2	1–3	2nd
1965–66	European Champion Clubs' Cup	1R	(Scotland)	Kilmarnock	0–0	0–1	0–1
1966–67	European Champion Clubs' Cup	1R	(Norway)	Vålerenga	(w/o)	(w/o)	(w/o)
1969–70	European Champion Clubs' Cup	1R	(Belgium)	Standard Liège	1–1	0–3	1–4
1970–71	European Champion Clubs' Cup	1R	(Netherlands)	Ajax	2–2	0–2	2–4
1975	Balkans Cup	Group B	(Greece)	Panionios	6–0	1–2	2nd
1975	Balkans Cup	Group B	(Socialist Federal Republic of Yugoslavia)	Radnički Niš	0–0	0–3	2nd
1981-83	Balkans Cup	Group B	(Greece)	Larissa	3–0	1–3	1st
1981-83	Balkans Cup	Group B	(Socialist Federal Republic of Yugoslavia)	Sloboda Tuzla	3–0	3–0	1st
1981-83	Balkans Cup	Final	(Bulgaria)	Beroe Stara Zagora	0–1	0–3	0–4
1982–83	European Champion Clubs' Cup	1R	(Northern Ireland)	Linfield	1–0	1–2	2–2
1982–83	European Champion Clubs' Cup	2R	(Soviet Union)	Dynamo Kyiv	(w/o)	(w/o)	(w/o)
1983–84	UEFA Cup Winners' Cup	1R	(Sweden)	Hammarby IF	2–1	0–3	2–4
1986–87	UEFA Cup Winners' Cup	1R	(Romania)	Dinamo București	1–0	2–1	3–1
1986–87	UEFA Cup Winners' Cup	2R	(Sweden)	Malmö FF	0–3	0–0	0–3
1988–89	European Champion Clubs' Cup	1R	(Malta)	Ħamrun Spartans	2–0	1–2	3–2
1988–89	European Champion Clubs' Cup	2R	(Sweden)	IFK Göteborg	0–3	0–1	0–4
1989–90	European Champion Clubs' Cup	1R	(Malta)	Sliema Wanderers	5–0	0–1	5–1
1989–90	European Champion Clubs' Cup	2R	(Germany)	Bayern Munich	0–3	1–3	1–6
1990–91	Balkans Cup	QF	(Socialist Federal Republic of Yugoslavia)	Budućnost Titograd	0–0	1–2	1–2
1994–95	UEFA Cup Winners' Cup	QR	(Belarus)	Bobruisk	3–0	1–4	4–3
1994–95	UEFA Cup Winners' Cup	1R	(Denmark)	Brøndby IF	0–1	0–3	0–4
1995–96	UEFA Cup	QR	(Israel)	Hapoel Be'er Sheva	0–1	0–2	0–3
1996–97	UEFA Cup	1QR	(Croatia)	Croatia Zagreb	2–6	0–4	2–10
1998–99	UEFA Cup	1QR	(Slovakia)	Inter Bratislava	0–2	0–2	0–4
1999–00	UEFA Champions League	1QR	(Iceland)	Íþróttabandalag Vestmannaeyja	1–2	0–1	1–3
2000–01	UEFA Champions League	1QR	(Moldova)	Zimbru Chisinau	2–3	2–3	4–6
2001–02	UEFA Cup	QR	(Cyprus)	Apollon Limassol	3–2	1–3	4–5
2002–03	UEFA Cup	QR	(Romania)	Național București	0–1	2–2	2–3
2003–04	UEFA Champions League	1Q	(Georgia (country))	Dinamo Tbilisi	3–0	0–3	3–3 (4–2 p)
2003–04	UEFA Champions League	2QR	(Austria)	Grazer AK	1–5	1–2	2–7
2004–05	UEFA Champions League	1QR	(Belarus)	Gomel	0–1	2–0	2–2
2004–05	UEFA Champions League	2QR	(Hungary)	Ferencváros	2–3	1–0	3–3
2005–06	UEFA Champions League	1QR	(Slovenia)	Gorica	3–0	0–2	3–2
2005–06	UEFA Champions League	2QR	(Bulgaria)	CSKA Sofia	0–2	0–2	0–4
2006–07	UEFA Cup	1QR	(Croatia)	Varteks	2–0	1–1	3–1
2006–07	UEFA Cup	2QR	(Turkey)	Kayserispor	0–2	1–3	1–5
2007–08	UEFA Champions League	1QR	(Slovenia)	Domžale	1–2	0–1	1–3
2009–10	UEFA Champions League	2QR	(Norway)	Stabæk	1–1	0–4	1–5
2010–11	UEFA Europa League	1QR	(Hungary)	Zalaegerszeg	0–0	1−0 (a.e.t.)	1–0 (a.e.t.)
2010–11	UEFA Europa League	2QR	(Netherlands)	Utrecht	1–1	0–4	1–5
2011–12	UEFA Europa League	2QR	(Slovakia)	Spartak Trnava	0–0	1–3	1–3
2012–13	UEFA Europa League	1QR	(Luxembourg)	Grevenmacher	2−0	0–0	2–0
2012–13	UEFA Europa League	2QR	(Norway)	Aalesund	1–1	0–5	1–6
2017–18	UEFA Europa League	1QR	(Israel)	Maccabi Tel Aviv	0–3	0–2	0–5
2020–21	UEFA Champions League	1QR	(Georgia (country))	Dinamo Tbilisi	—N/a	2−0	2–0
2020–21	UEFA Champions League	2QR	(Serbia)	Red Star Belgrade	0−1	—N/a	0–1
2020–21	UEFA Europa League	3QR		BYE	—N/a	—N/a	—N/a
2020–21	UEFA Europa League	PO	(Switzerland)	Young Boys	—N/a	0–3	0–3
2022–23	UEFA Champions League	1QR	(Luxembourg)	F91 Dudelange	1−2	0–1	1–3
2022–23	UEFA Europa Conference League	2QR	(Bosnia and Herzegovina)	HŠK Zrinjski Mostar	0–1	2–3	2–4
2023–24	UEFA Europa Conference League	1QR	(Georgia (country))	Dinamo Batumi	1–1	2–1	3–2
2023–24	UEFA Europa Conference League	2QR	(Turkey)	Beşiktaş	0–2	1–3	1–5
2024–25	UEFA Conference League	1QR	(Georgia (country))	Torpedo Kutaisi	0–1	1–1	1–2

=== World and European rankings ===
UEFA club coefficient ranking

(As of 27 February 2026)

Rank	Team	Points
234	(Azerbaijan) Neftchi PFK	4.000
235	(Republic of Ireland) Derry City F.C.	4.000
236	(Albania) KF Tirana	4.000
237	(Northern Ireland) Crusaders FC	4.000
238	(North Macedonia) FC Struga	4.000

World club coefficient ranking

(As of 27 February 2026)

Rank	Team	Points
2265	(Saudi Arabia) Al Adalah Club	1.249
2266	(Kazakhstan) FC Sunkar	1.249
2267	(Albania) KF Tirana	1.249
2268	(Romania) CS Gaz Metan Mediaș	1.249
2269	FC Ararat-Armenia	1.249

== European campaigns – Finals achievements ==
Season	Achievement	Notes
UEFA Champions League
1982-83	Round of 16	eliminated by (Ukraine) Dynamo Kyiv both matches were not played
1988–89	Round of 16	eliminated by (Sweden) Göteborg 0–3 in Tirana and 1–0 in Göteborg
1989-90	Round of 16	eliminated by (Germany) Bayern Munich 3–1 in Munich and 0–3 in Tirana

Season	Achievement	Notes
UEFA Europa League
2020-21	Play-Off	eliminated by (Switzerland) Young Boys 0–3 in Bern

Season	Achievement	Notes
UEFA Cup Winners' Cup
1986-87	Round of 16	eliminated by (Sweden) Malmö 0–3 in Tirana and 0–0 in Malmö
1994-95	Round of 32	eliminated by (Denmark) Brøndby 3–0 in Brøndby and 0–1 in Tirana

Season	Achievement	Notes
Balkans Cup
1981-83	Runners Up	eliminated by (Bulgaria) Beroe Stara Zagora 0–3 in Stara Zagora and 1–3 in Tirana

=== Player records ===
- Most appearances in UEFA club competitions: 31 appearances:
  - Elvis Sina
- Top scorer in UEFA club competitions: 10 goals – Indrit Fortuzi

== List of managers ==
=== Managerial record ===
Coach	from	until	Trophies won	
(Albania) Selman Stërmasi	1930	1933	3	National Championships
(Hungary) Samo Singer	1933	1934	1	National Championship
(Albania) Selman Stërmasi	1934	1938	2	National Championships
(Israel) Friez Weinstein	1938	1938	0	
(Albania) Selman Stërmasi	1938	1942	2	National Championships
(Albania) Adem Karapici	1947	1950	0	
(Albania) Myslym Alla	1950	1953	0	
(Albania) Ludovik Jakova	1953	1955	0	
(Albania) Myslym Alla	1955	1972	5	4 National Championships, Albanian Cup
(Albania) Enver Shehu	1972	1973	0	
(Albania) Fatbardh Deliallisi	1973	1974	0	
(Albania) Zyber Konçi	1975	1975	0	
(Albania) Fatmir Frashëri	1975	1980	2	Albanian Cups
(Albania) Enver Shehu	1980	1987	5	2 National Championships, 3 Albanian Cups
(Albania) Shyqyri Rreli	1987	1990	2	National Championships
(Albania) Fatmir Frashëri	1990	1991	0	
(Albania) Enver Shehu	1992	1993	0	
(Albania) Fatmir Frashëri	1993	1994	0	
(Albania) Shkëlqim Muça	1 July 1994	1 July 1995	2	National Championships, Albanian Supercup
(Albania) Sulejman Mema	1 July 1995	1 July 1996	2	National Championships, Albanian Cup
(Albania) Enver Shehu	1 July 1996	3 May 1997	1	National Championships
(Albania) Ramadan Shehu	3 May 1997	3 May 1998	0	
(Albania) Millan Baçi ^{i}	3 May 1998	1 July 1998	0	
(Albania) Ali Mema	1 July 1998	1 July 1999	2	National Championships, Albanian Cup
(Albania) Shkëlqim Muça	1 July 1999	1 July 2000	1	National Championships
(Hungary) Miklós Temesvári	1 July 2000	14 April 2001	1	Albanian Supercup
(Albania) Shkëlqim Muça	14 April 2001	1 May 2002	1	Albanian Cup
(Albania) Sulejman Mema	1 May 2002	1 July 2002	0	
(Bosnia and Herzegovina) Enver Hadžiabdić	1 July 2002	21 Feb 2003	1	Albanian Supercup
(Albania) Krenar Alimehmeti	21 Feb 2003	28 Feb 2003	0	
(Albania) Fatmir Frashëri	28 Feb 2003	1 July 2003	1	National Championships
(Albania) Sulejman Mema	1 July 2003	25 Oct 2003	1	Albanian Supercup
(Albania) Mirel Josa	2 Nov 2003	20 Aug 2004	2	Kategoria Superiore, Albanian Supercup
(Albania) Luan Sengla	21 Aug 2004	1 Sep 2004	0	
(Albania) Sulejman Starova	Sept 1, 2004	1 July 2005	2	Kategoria Superiore, Albanian Supercup
(Italy) Leonardo Menichini	1 July 2005	11 Nov 2005	0	
(Albania) Shkëlqim Muça ^{i}	11 Nov 2005	15 Nov 2005	0	
(Albania) Krenar Alimehmeti	15 Nov 2005	15 Feb 2006	0	
(Albania) Mirel Josa	17 Feb 2006	13 Nov 2006	2	Albanian Cup, Albanian Supercup
(Albania) Shkëlqim Muça	14 Nov 2006	1 July 2007	1	Kategoria Superiore
(Albania) Sulejman Starova	1 July 2007	Sept 19, 2007	1	Albanian Supercup
(Albania) Krenar Alimehmeti ^{i}	Sept 22, 2007	Sept 25, 2007	0	
(Albania) Ardian Mema ^{i}	Sept 22, 2007	Sept 25, 2007	0	
(Albania) Astrit Hafizi	Sept 25, 2007	3 Feb 2008	0	
(Albania) Sulejman Mema	3 Feb 2008	1 July 2008	0	
(Bosnia and Herzegovina) Blaž Slišković	1 July 2008	11 Dec 2008	0	
(Albania) Agustin Kola	11 Dec 2008	2 May 2009	1	
(Italy) Mauro Bencivenga	8 May 2009	21 June 2009	1	Kategoria Superiore
(Croatia) Ilija Lončarević	21 June 2009	6 Oct 2009	1	Albanian Supercup
(Albania) Alban Tafaj ^{i}	6 Oct 2009	26 Jan 2010	0	
(Albania) Nevil Dede	26 Jan 2010	9 Feb 2010	0	
(Albania) Devi Muka ^{i}	9 Feb 2010	14 Feb 2010	0	
(Albania) Luan Sengla	14 Feb 2010	29 Mar 2010	0	
(Albania) Sulejman Starova	29 Mar 2010	10 Oct 2010	0	
(Albania) Nevil Dede	11 Oct 2010	6 Feb 2011	0	
(Croatia) Mišo Krstičević	8 Feb 2011	22 June 2011	1	Albanian Cup
(Spain) Julián Rubio	22 June 2011	31 Aug 2012	3	Albanian Cup, 2 Albanian Supercup, Albanian Supercup
(Albania) Alban Tafaj ^{i}	Sept 1, 2012	Sept 16, 2012	0	
(Albania) Artur Lekbello	Sept 17, 2012	30 Oct 2012	0	
(Albania) Alban Tafaj ^{i}	30 Oct 2012	18 Feb 2013	0	
(Albania) Nevil Dede	18 Feb 2013	24 Oct 2013	0	
(Albania) Alpin Gallo	25 Oct 2013	25 Nov 2013	0	
(Albania) Sokol Bulku ^{i}	28 Nov 2013	1 Dec 2013	0	
(Albania) Gugash Magani	1 Dec 2013	17 May 2015	0	
(Nigeria) Ndubuisi Egbo ^{i}	18 May 2015	1 June 2015	0	
(Albania) Shkëlqim Muça	1 June 2015	17 Oct 2015	0	
(Serbia) Ivan Gvozdenović ^{i}	18 Oct 2015	28 Oct 2015	0	
(Albania) Ilir Daja	28 Oct 2015	29 Oct 2016	0	
(Albania) Mirel Josa	30 Oct 2016	15 Jun 2017	1	Albanian Cup
(Brazil) Zé Maria	17 Jun 2017	11 Oct 2018	3	Albanian Supercup, Albanian First Division, Winner Group B
(Albania) Ardian Mema	12 Oct 2018	24 Oct 2019	0	
(Albania) Julian Ahmataj	25 Oct 2019	8 Dec 2019	0	
(Nigeria) Ndubuisi Egbo	9 Dec 2019	12 Nov 2020	1	Albania Superliga
(Albania) Nevil Dede	13 Nov 2020	25 Jan 2021	0	
(Albania) Tefik Osmani ^{i}	25 Jan 2021	26 Jan 2021	0	
(Albania) Orges Shehi	27 Jan 2021	5 Oct 2023	2	Albania Superliga, Albanian Supercup
(Albania) Julian Ahmataj	5 Oct 2023	19 Feb 2024	0	
(Albania) Erbim Fagu	20 Feb 2024	23 May 2024	0	
(Albania) Bledi Shkëmbi	5 Jun 2024	5 Nov 2024	0	
(Albania) Gugash Magani	6 Nov 2024	18 Jan 2025	0	
(Albania) Bledi Shkëmbi	20 Jan 2025	18 Jun 2025	0	
(Albania) Vangjel Mile	14 Jul 2025	6 Sep 2025	0	
(Italy) Roberto Bordin	7 Sep 2025	31 Oct 2025	0	
(North Macedonia) Ardian Nuhiu	1 Nov 2025	23 Feb 2026	0	
(Albania) Orges Shehi	24 Feb 2026	5 Jun 2026	0	
(Croatia) Dean Klafurić	20 Jun 2026			

(i) = interim

== Personnel ==
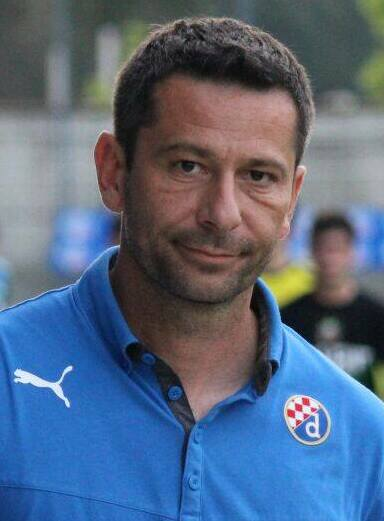
Coach Dean Klafurić

Position	Name
Coach	(Croatia) Dean Klafurić
Assistant manager	(North Macedonia) Bojan Markoski
Goalkeeping coach	(Albania) Alfred Osmani
Athletic coach	(Croatia) Albert Rebac
Team doctor	(Albania) Arzen Voci
Team doctor	(Albania) Marvi Kastrati
Fiziotherapist	(Albania) Tedi Maqellari
Fitnes Coach	(Albania) Xhuljan Reçi
Fitnes Coach	(Albania) Ervin Baku
Store man	(Albania) Hajdar Karaj
B Coach	(Albania) Gentian Muca
U–21 Coach	(Albania) Gentian Muca
U–19 Coach	(Albania) Gazmend Xhepa
U–18 Coach	(Albania) Matias Qirinxhi
U–17 Coach	(Albania) Endri Ohri
U–16 Coach	(Albania) Blerim Tujani
U–15 Coach	(Albania) Akil Jakupi
U–14 Coach	(Albania) Besmir Jakupi
U–13 Coach	(Albania) Besmir Jakupi
Team doctor academy	(Albania) Arlind Feruku
Team doctor academy	(Albania) Eri Xharra

== Management ==
Position	Name
President	(Albania) Refik Halili
Vice–President	(Albania) Grend Halili
Shareholder	(Albania) HALILI SH.P.K (66%)
Shareholder	(Albania) Tirana Municipal Council (34%)
Academy director	(Albania) Vangjel Mile
Technical director	(North Macedonia) Omer Bunjaku
Technical director of the academy	(Albania) Gentian Muca
Video analyst	(Albania) Klajdi Kënga
Director of youth department	(Albania) Krenar Alimehmeti
Disagne Model	(Albania) Goldi Halili
Photographer	(Albania) Izmir Doda

== Kit suppliers ==
Period	Kit provider	Shirt sponsor
1988–1991	Umbro	Ariston
1993–1997	Umbro	Parmalat
1998–1999	Adidas	Kent
1999–2000	Adidas	Hawaii
2000–2001	Joma	Hawaii
2001–2002	Joma	Volkswagen
2002–2004	Jako	Volkswagen
2004–2006	Puma	Volkswagen
2006–2008	Adidas	Volkswagen
2008–2009	Puma	Volkswagen
2009–2010	Lotto	Vila Goldi
2010–2011	Adidas	none
2011–2012	Macron	BPP Group
2012–2013	Errea	none
2013–2015	Legea	none
2015–2016	Legea	Birra Tirana
2016–2019	Macron	none
2019–2022	Uhlsport	
2019–2022	Uhlsport	Caffè Vergnano
2019–2022	Uhlsport	Vila Goldi
2019–2022	Uhlsport	Air Albania
2019–2022	Uhlsport	none
2022–2024	Cohl's	Lori Caffe
2024–2026	Joma	none
2026–2027	Joma	Lajthiza Water

== KF Tirana Sponsorship ==
Sponsor Type	Name
Main Sponsors	Halili Constructions, Municipality of Tirana
Secondary Sponsors	Vila Goldi, Spitali Salus, Lajthiza Water, Tirana Dekor, Lori Caffe, Skela Syla
Official clothing provider	Joma

== Presidents ==
Tirana have had numerous presidents over the course of their history, some of which have been the owners of the club, others have been administrators and honorary presidents such as Bamir Topi and Fatmir Frashëri. The president has historically taken sole charge of the club, except for the period between 2007 and 2008, when was the presidency was formally vacant and numerous donors managed the club. The club have had a total of 13 president and 15 presidencies since 1920, with only Bamir Topi and Refik Halili having held the position on two occasions. The longest serving president is Selman Stërmasi who took charge of the club for 24 years between 1936 and 1960, while the shortest presidency belongs to Fatmir Frashëri, who took charge for one year between 2004 and 2005. Between 1999 and 2004, Egyptian national Metwally El Sayed managed the club as President, becoming the club's only foreign President in the history. Here is a complete list of club president from when Bahri Toptani took over at the club in 1920, until the present day.

Name	Years
(Albania) Bahri Toptani	1920–1933
(Albania) Stefan Shundi	1933–1936
(Albania) Selman Stërmasi	1936–1960
(Albania) Lame Konomi	1960–1970
(Albania) Nuri Bylyku	1970–1983
(Albania) Çlirimi Hysi	1983–1985
(Albania) Zija Shaba	1985–1993
(Albania) Metush Seferi	1993–1998
(Albania) Lutfi Nuri	1998–1999
(Egypt) Metwally El Sayed	1999–2004
(Albania) Refik Halili (Albania) Agron Papuli (Albania) Shefikat Ngjela (Albania) Avni Nuri	2004–2008
(Albania) Refik Halili	2008–2011
(Albania) Lulzim Basha	2011–2012
(Albania) Ndriçim Babasi	2012–2013
(Albania) Refik Halili (Albania) Julian Morina	2013–2014
(Albania) Refik Halili	2014–

== See also ==
- Albanian football clubs in European competitions
- Tirana Rugby Club

== Notes and references ==
=== Notes ===
1. Since the start of 2014–15 season, Tirana retired the number 12 as a recognition towards the Tirona Fanatics, the club's biggest fanbase, considered the 12th man in the pitch.
