= SK Tirana =

- Full name: Sport Klub Tirana
- Nickname: Bardheblutë (The White and Blues)
- Founded: 15 August 1920; 105 years ago
- Based in: Tirana, Albania
- Colors: Blue and white
- Website: kftirana.al

Sport Klub Tirana is an Albanian sports club based in the country's capital Tirana, most notable for its association football department. The club also consists of various other departments including basketball, volleyball, futsal and boxing.

== Departments ==
Sport	Teams
Association football	KF Tirana (men's football)
Association football	KFF Tirana (women's football)
Association football	FK Tirana
Association football	KF Tirana U-21 (men's football)
Association football	KF Tirana Academy (youth football)
Basketball	KB Tirana (men's basketball)
Volleyball	KV Tirana (men's volleyball)
Volleyball	KV Tirana (women's volleyball)
Rugby	KR Tirana
Tennis	Tennis Tirana
Boxing	Klubi Boks Tirana
Weightlifting	SK Tirana
Athletics	SK Tirana
Swimming	SK Tirana
Cycling	SK Tirana
Judo	SK Tirana
Chess	SK Tirana (defunct)
