= 1936 Albanian National Championship =

Albanian National Championship
- Season: 1936
- Champions: KF Tirana

The 1936 Albanian National Championship was the sixth season of the Albanian National Championship, the top professional league for association football clubs, since its establishment in 1930.

== Overview ==
It was contested by 8 teams, and KF Tirana won the championship.

== League standings ==
Pos	Team	Pld	W	D	L	GF	GA	GR	Pts
1	Tirana (C)	14	11	3	0	50	8	6.250	25
2	Vllaznia	14	10	3	1	27	12	2.250	23
3	Besa	14	4	5	5	21	22	0.955	13
4	Skënderbeu	14	5	4	5	20	18	1.111	14
5	Durrësi	14	3	5	6	14	19	0.737	11
6	Dragoj	14	4	1	9	11	31	0.355	9
7	Ismail Qemali	14	3	3	8	14	35	0.400	9
8	Bashkimi Elbasanas	14	3	2	9	12	24	0.500	8

Source: RSSSF.org
Rules for classification: 1) points; 2) goal difference; 3) number of goals scored.
(C) Champions

== Results ==
Home \ Away	BEL	BES	DRA	DUR	IQE	SKË	TIR	VLL
Bashkimi Elbasanas		2–2	2–0	1–0	0–2	2–2	1–3	1–2
Besa	3–1		1–1	1–1	4–0	2–1	0–3	1–1
Dragoj	0–2	3–0		2–1	1–0	1–4	0–5	0–2
Durrësi	2–0	1–1	2–0		2–1	2–2	1–4	0–1
Ismail Qemali	2–0	3–1	1–2	1–1		0–0	2–2	0–1
Skënderbeu	1–0	0–2	4–0	2–0	6–0		0–0	0–2
Tirana	3–0	3–1	3–0	2–0	11–0	5–0		4–1
Vllaznia	2–0	2–0	4–1	1–1	4–2	2–0	2–2	

Source: RSSSF.org
Legend: Blue = home team win; Yellow = draw; Red = away team win.
