= 1937 Albanian National Championship =

Albanian National Championship
- Season: 1937
- Champions: KF Tirana

The 1937 Albanian National Championship was the seventh season of the Albanian National Championship, the top professional league for association football clubs, since its establishment in 1930.

== Overview ==
It was contested by 10 teams, and KF Tirana won the championship.

== League standings ==
Pos	Team	Pld	W	D	L	GF	GA	GR	Pts
1	Tirana (C)	18	17	1	0	74	8	9.250	35
2	Vllaznia	18	14	1	3	55	15	3.667	29
3	Besa	18	10	2	6	49	20	2.450	22
4	Skënderbeu	18	8	2	8	22	31	0.710	18
5	Bashkimi Elbasanas	18	7	3	8	28	28	1.000	17
6	Bardhyli	18	6	3	9	22	42	0.524	15
7	Dragoj	18	4	5	9	18	36	0.500	13
8	Durrësi	18	4	3	11	13	35	0.371	11
9	Ismail Qemali	18	3	4	11	10	43	0.233	10
10	Tomori	18	3	4	11	17	50	0.340	10

Source: RSSSF.org
Rules for classification: 1) points; 2) goal difference; 3) number of goals scored.
(C) Champions

== Results ==
Home \ Away	BAR	BEL	BES	DRA	DUR	IQE	SKË	TIR	TOM	VLL
Bardhyli		2–0	3–1	1–2	1–0	1–1	3–4	2–2	2–0	1–2
Bashkimi Elbasanas	0–0		2–0	0–0	0–0	2–0	3–0	0–2	4–1	1–3
Besa	5–0	5–3		3–0	3–0	9–1	3–0	1–2	8–0	2–0
Dragoj	1–2	2–1	1–1		4–1	1–1	1–2	1–4	2–0	0–2
Durrësi	2–1	1–2	0–3	1–0		2–1	0–1	0–2	1–1	2–4
Ismail Qemali	2–0	0–4	0–2	1–0	1–2		0–0	0–4	2–1	0–0
Skënderbeu	2–1	0–2	2–1	1–1	1–0	5–0		1–5	0–2	1–3
Tirana	11–0	4–1	2–0	8–0	8–0	2–0	2–0		5–1	4–1
Tomori	0–2	4–2	1–1	2–2	1–1	2–0	1–2	0–5		0–4
Vllaznia	7–0	4–1	3–1	5–0	1–0	6–0	3–0	0–2	7–0	

Source: RSSSF.org
Legend: Blue = home team win; Yellow = draw; Red = away team win.
