= 1934 Albanian National Championship =

Albanian National Championship
- Season: 1934
- Champions: KF Tirana

The 1934 Albanian National Championship was the fifth season of the Albanian National Championship, the top professional league for association football clubs.

== Overview ==
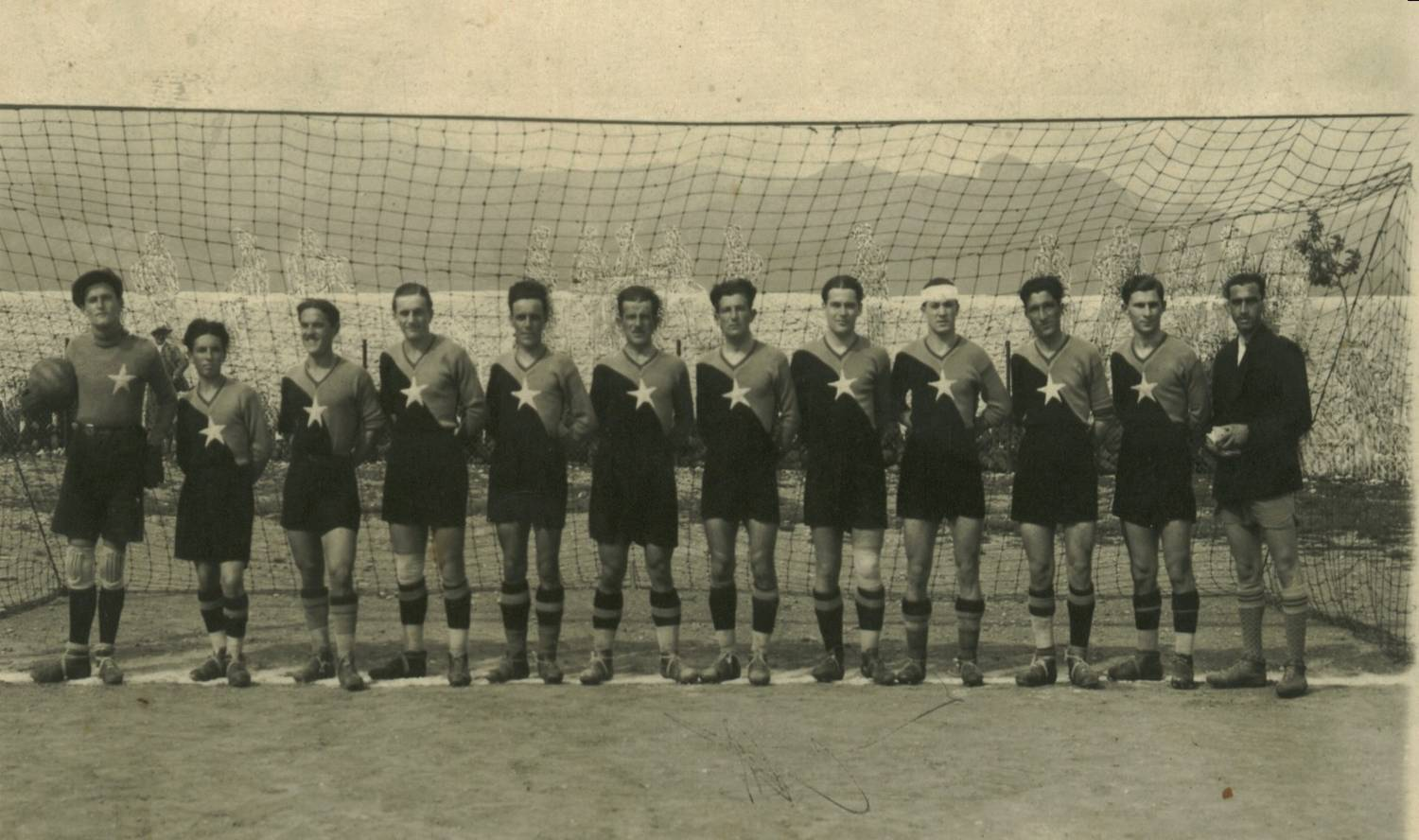
The Bashkimi Shkodran squad of 1935. From left to right: Kin Bushati (goalkeeper) Ernest Halepiani, Gjelosh Gjeka, Pjeter Gjoka, Qazim Dervishi (captain), Muhamet Halili, Asim Golemi, Luigj Radoja, Gjon Kiri, Myzafer Pipa, Hile Staka, Luigj Shala (coach)

The Championship was contested by 7 teams. KF Tirana won the championship for the fourth time in its history.

== League standings ==
Pos	Team	Pld	W	D	L	GF	GA	GR	Pts
1	Tirana (C)	12	10	1	1	54	8	6.750	21
2	Skënderbeu	12	8	2	2	27	8	3.375	18
3	Bashkimi Shkodran	12	8	1	3	25	11	2.273	17
4	Teuta	12	6	0	6	18	23	0.783	12
5	Kavaja	12	3	3	6	14	20	0.700	9
6	Bashkimi Elbasanas	12	2	2	8	12	36	0.333	6
7	Sportklub Vlora	12	0	1	11	4	48	0.083	1

Source: RSSSF.org
Rules for classification: 1) points; 2) goal difference; 3) number of goals scored.
(C) Champions

== Results ==
Home \ Away	BEL	BAS	KAV	SKË	SKV	TEU	TIR
Bashkimi Elbasanas		1–0	2–2	0–3	6–0	1–4	0–5
Bashkimi Shkodran	2–0		1–0	3–1	8–0	1–0	1–2
Kavaja	4–1	2–2		0–4	3–0	0–1	1–2
Skënderbeu	1–0	4–0	0–0		4–1	2–0	0–2
Sportklub Vlora	1–1	1–3	1–2	0–5		0–1	0–5
Teuta	5–0	0–3	2–0	0–1	2–0		3–6
Tirana	9–0	0–1	4–0	2–2	8–0	9–0	

Source: RSSSF.org
Legend: Blue = home team win; Yellow = draw; Red = away team win.
