= Skënder Jareci =

Albanian footballer and manager

Personal information
- Date of birth: 5 May 1931
- Place of birth: Durrës, Albania
- Date of death: 9 March 1984 (aged 52)
- Place of death: Albania
- Position: Forward

Senior career*
Years	Team	Apps	(Gls)
1947–1949	Ylli i Kuq Durrës		(3)
1950–1963	Dinamo Tirana		(119)

International career
1949–1958	Albania	8	(1)

Managerial career
- 1960: Lokomotiva Durrës
- 1964-1965: Vllaznia
- 1966–1973: Dinamo Tirana
- 1970s: Lokomotiva Durrës
- * Club domestic league appearances and goals

Skënder Jareci (5 May 1931 – 9 March 1984) was an Albanian former football manager and player.

Jareci represented Teuta Durrës and Dinamo Tirana during his playing career and also won 8 caps for the Albania national team. He is the tenth all-time top goalscorer in the history of Albanian Superliga with 122 goals.

== Playing career ==
=== Club ===
In 1950, Jareci joined the newly established Dinamo Tirana club, with whom he won 7 championships and 6 cups, establishing himself as one of the best Albanian strikers of his generation. In the 1951 and 1952 seasons, Jareci played an important role as Dinamo won 25 consecutive matches in league, setting the record in Albania and ranked just 4th tied with Celtic in Europe's longest domestic winning streaks. He was Albania's player of the year three times, in 1952, 1957 and 1958.

=== International ===
Jareci made his international debut on 6 November 1949 in a friendly versus Poland, entering in the second half as the match ended in a 2–1 loss. His first and only international goal came later on 29 November 1952 in the 3–2 home win over Czechoslovakia. He earned his last cap six years later by playing in the 1–1 draw against East Germany.

=== International statistics ===
Appearances and goals by national team and year
National team	Year	Apps	Goals
Albania	1949	1	0
Albania	1950	3	0
Albania	1952	2	1
Albania	1953	1	0
Albania	1959	1	0
Total		8	1

== Managerial career ==
Jareci's managerial career reached its peak during his spell with Dinamo Tirana, in which he established himself as one of the greatest Albanian managers of all time. He also promoted youth talents such as Faruk Sejdini and Ilir Përnaska, with the latter becoming a one-club man and scoring more than 100 goals. With Vllaznia, he won the 1964–65 Albanian Cup.

== Personal life ==
Jareci was born in Durrës in 1931 to parents from Debar who had moved to Durrës in 1920 to escape conflict with neighboring Yugoslavs. His father had established himself as successful trader in Durrës, but was arrested and killed by the Albanian communists in the late 1940s once they had taken control of the country.

His brother Namik Jareci was also a professional footballer who played alongside Skënder at Dinamo Tirana for several years. Skënder was married to musician Jozefilda, who derives from a family in Mirditë District. They had two daughters, Iva and Ina.

He died after a long illness in 1984.

== Honours ==
=== Club ===
- Albanian Superliga: 1950, 1951, 1952, 1953, 1955, 1956, 1960
- Albanian Cup: 1950, 1951, 1952, 1953, 1954, 1960

=== Individual ===
- Albanian Superliga top goalscorer: 1955 (shared with Refik Resmja), 1958, 1960
