= Sabri Peqini =

Albanian footballer and manager (1926–2021)

Personal information
- Full name: Sabri Peqini
- Date of birth: 15 December 1926
- Place of birth: Belsh, Albania
- Date of death: 13 March 2021 (aged 94)

Senior career*
Years	Team	Apps	(Gls)
1946–1950	Erzeni		
1950–1954	Dinamo Tirana		

International career
1950–1952	Albania	3	(0)

Managerial career
- 1957–1960: Labinoti Elbasan
- 1974–1976: Dinamo Tirana
- * Club domestic league appearances and goals

Sabri Peqini (15 December 1926 – 13 March 2021) was an Albanian footballer and football manager, who played for and coached Dinamo Tirana.

== International career ==
He made his debut for Albania in a June 1950 friendly match against Bulgaria and earned a total of 3 caps, scoring no goals. His final international was a December 1952 friendly against Czechoslovakia.

== Personal life ==
Born to Hahxiu and Shahe, Sabri grew up in Shijak. He was the father of former Albanian international Kastriot Peqini and grandfather of Jurgen Peqini, also a professional footballer.

Peqini was interviewed in November 2019 at the age of 92. He stated that he no longer attended football matches as he considered the sport was too motivated by money. He died in March 2021 at the age of 94.

== Honours ==
as a player

- Albanian Superliga: 4

1950, 1951, 1952, 1953

- Albanian Cup: 5

1950, 1951, 1952, 1953, 1954

as a manager

- Albanian Superliga: 1

1975
