= 1976–77 Albanian Cup =

Kupa e Shqipërisë

Tournament details
- Country: Albania

Final positions
- Champions: 17 Nëntori
- Runners-up: Dinamo Tirana

1976–77 Albanian Cup (Albanian: Kupa e Shqipërisë) was the twenty-fifth season of Albania's annual cup competition. It began in August 1976 with the First Round and ended in May 1977 with the Final match. The winners of the competition qualified for the 1977-78 first round of the UEFA Cup. 17 Nëntori were the defending champions, having won their third Albanian Cup last season. The cup was won by 17 Nëntori.

The rounds were played in a two-legged format similar to those of European competitions. If the aggregated score was tied after both games, the team with the higher number of away goals advanced. If the number of away goals was equal in both games, the match was decided by extra time and a penalty shootout, if necessary.

== First round ==
Games were played on August & September 1976*

- Results unknown

== Second round ==
All sixteen teams of the 1975–76 Superliga and First Division entered in this round. First and second legs were played in January 1977.

| Team 1 | Agg. | Team 2 | 1st leg | 2nd leg |
|---|---|---|---|---|
| Partizani | 5–1 | Minatori Tepelena | 3–0 | 2–1 |
| Besëlidhja | 2–6 | Vllaznia | 0–3 | 2–3 |
| Skënderbeu | 3–0 | Labinoti | 2–0 | 1–0 |
| Luftëtari | 4–2 | Flamurtari | 1–0 | 3–2 |
| Butrinti | 2–5 | Dinamo Tirana | 1–1 | 1–4 |
| Lokomotiva Durrës | 3–2 | Shkëndija Tirana | 2–1 | 1–1 |
| 17 Nëntori | 4–2 | Tomori | 3–1 | 1–1 |
| Traktori | 1–0 | Besa | 1–0 | 0–0 |

== Quarter-finals ==
In this round entered the 8 winners from the previous round.

| Team 1 | Agg. | Team 2 | 1st leg | 2nd leg |
|---|---|---|---|---|
| Traktori | 3–2 | Luftëtari | 1–0 | 2–2 |
| Skënderbeu | 1–3 | 17 Nëntori | 1–2 | 0–1 |
| Partizani | 0–5 | Dinamo Tirana | 0–1 | 0–4 |
| Lokomotiva Durrës | 0–2 | Vllaznia | 0–0 | 0–2 |

== Semi-finals ==
In this round entered the four winners from the previous round.

| Team 1 | Agg. | Team 2 | 1st leg | 2nd leg |
|---|---|---|---|---|
| 17 Nëntori | 3–1 | Traktori | 3–0 | 0–1 |
| Vllaznia | 1–2 | Dinamo Tirana | 0–0 | 1–2 |

== Final ==
In this round entered the two winners from the previous round.

| Team 1 | Agg. | Team 2 | 1st leg | 2nd leg |
|---|---|---|---|---|
| Dinamo Tirana | 3–3 (7–8 p) | 17 Nëntori | 2–1 | 1–2 |

=== First leg ===
9 January 1977

| Dinamo Tirana | 2–1 | 17 Nëntori |
|---|---|---|
| Zëri 30'; Sh. Ballgjini 87' | | Braho 57' (pen.) |

Qemal Stafa Stadium, Tirana
Attendance: 14,000
Referee: S. Caslli

=== Second leg ===
16 January 1977

| 17 Nëntori | 2–1 (a.e.t.) | Dinamo Tirana |
|---|---|---|
| Dibra 44'; Çela 64' | | Sh. Ballgjini 58' |
Penalties
| Bekteshi (penalty scored); Dibra (penalty scored); Minga (penalty scored); Rizvanolli (penalty scored); Zengla (penalty scored); Baçi (penalty scored); Dhales (penalty scored) | 8–7 | (penalty scored) Zëri; (penalty scored) Çeço; (penalty scored) Ibërshimi; (penalty scored) Sh. Ballgjini; (penalty scored) Sejdini; (penalty scored) Targaj; (penalty missed) Përnaska |

Qemal Stafa Stadium, Tirana
Attendance: 15,000
Referee: R. Pregja
