= Vasillaq Zëri =

Albanian footballer (1952–2019)

Personal information
- Full name: Vasillaq Zëri
- Date of birth: 4 August 1952
- Place of birth: Tirana, Albania
- Date of death: 25 January 2019 (aged 66)
- Place of death: Albania
- Height: 1.67 m (5 ft 6 in)
- Position: Striker

Youth career
- 1967-1970: Shkëndija

Senior career*
Years	Team	Apps	(Gls)
1970–1973	Shkëndija		
1973–1984	Dinamo Tirana		

International career
1976–1982	Albania	6	(0)

Managerial career
- 1994: Dinamo Tirana
- 2001: Albania U21
- * Club domestic league appearances and goals

Vasillaq Zëri (4 August 1952 – 25 January 2019) was an Albanian footballer who played as a striker.

== Club career ==
Born in Tirana, Zëri started his career with hometown club Shkëndija and was part of the 'Golden Age' of Dinamo Tirana between 1974 and 1988, where under the guidance of Skënder Jareci the club dominated Albanian football, winning five championships and three Albanian Cups. Known for his dribbling skills and being able to play the ball with both feet, Zëri formed a successful offensive partnership with Ilir Përnaska and Shyqyri Ballgjini, which is considered to be the best offensive trio in Dinamo's history. Zëri impressed Ajax during Dinamo's 1980–81 European Cup clash with the Dutch giants and the latter insisted on buying him but they were told Albanian players were not allowed to move abroad.

== International career ==
He made his debut for Albania on 3 November 1976 in the 3–0 friendly win versus Algeria and earned a total of 6 caps, scoring no goals. His final international was a September 1982 European Championship qualification match against Austria.

=== International statistics ===
Appearances and goals by national team and year
National team	Year	Apps	Goals
Albania	1976	1	0
Albania	1980	3	0
Albania	1981	1	0
Albania	1982	1	0
Total		6	0

== Personal life ==
Zëri later worked for the Albanian Football Association. He was married to Vilma and they had two children, Julian and Ina.

=== Death ===
He died in January 2019 after a long illness.

== Honours ==
- Albanian Superliga: 4

1975, 1976, 1977, 1980

- Albanian Cup: 3

1974, 1978, 1980
