= Faruk Sejdini =

Albanian footballer and coach

Personal information
- Full name: Faruk Sejdini
- Date of birth: 7 February 1950 (age 76)
- Place of birth: Tirana, PR Albania
- Position: Defender

Youth career
- Dinamo Tirana

Senior career*
Years	Team	Apps	(Gls)
1966–1979	Dinamo Tirana		

International career
1971–1976	Albania	11	(0)

Managerial career
- 1994–1997: Dinamo Tirana
- 1998–1999: Dinamo Tirana
- 1999–2000: Luftëtari
- 2000–2001: Dinamo Tirana
- 2001: Besa Kavajë
- 2001–2002: Dinamo Tirana
- 2003: Apolonia Fier
- 2004: Dinamo Tirana
- 2004–2005: Dinamo Tirana
- 2006: Dinamo Tirana
- 2006: Shkumbini
- 2007: Skënderbeu
- 2007–2008: Bylis Ballsh
- 2009: Elbasani
- 2011: Dinamo Tirana
- 2015: Dinamo Tirana
- * Club domestic league appearances and goals

Faruk Sejdini (born 7 February 1950) is an Albanian professional football coach and former player.

== Club career ==
Sejdini had a successful albeit short career playing as a defender, representing Dinamo Tirana from 1966 to 1979. His career begun in 1967 in the academy when he was spotted by coach Skënder Jareci along with striker Ilir Përnaska, who become a future club legend. He was part of Dinamo's golden generation of the 1970', winning five Albanian Superliga titles and three Albanian Cups.

== International career ==
He made his debut for Albania in a May 1971 Olympic Games qualification match against Romania and earned a total of 11 caps, scoring no goals. His final international was a November 1976 friendly match against Algeria.

=== International statistics ===
Appearances and goals by national team and year
National team	Year	Apps	Goals
Albania	1971	3	0
Albania	1972	2	0
Albania	1973	5	0
Albania	1976	1	0
Total		11	0

== Managerial career ==
His last coaching experience was in 2015 when he had a brief spell with Dinamo Tirana.

== Honours ==
Player

- Albanian Superliga: 5

1967, 1973, 1975, 1976, 1977

- Albanian Cup: 3

1971, 1974, 1978

Manager career

- Albanian Superliga: 1

2002
