= Shyqyri Rreli =

Albanian footballer (1930–2019)

Personal information
- Full name: Shyqyri Rreli
- Date of birth: 18 May 1930
- Place of birth: Tirana, Albania
- Date of death: 31 December 2019 (aged 89)
- Position: Midfielder

Senior career*
Years	Team	Apps	(Gls)
1948	Erzeni		
1949–1952	Puna Tirana		
1953–1962	Dinamo Tirana		

International career^{‡}
1957	Albania	1	(0)

Managerial career
- 1961–1968: Petro Nini Luarasi
- 1968–19xx: Shkëndija Tirana U19
- 19xx–19xx: Shkëndija
- 1972–1982: Albania U-21
- 1981–1985: Albania
- 1987–1990: 17 Nëntori
- 1987–1990: Albania
- 1993: Teuta
- 1994–1998: Albanët
- 1995: Shkumbini
- * Club domestic league appearances and goals as of February 3, 2014 ‡ National team caps and goals as of February 3, 2014

Shyqyri Rreli (18 May 1930 – 31 December 2019) was an Albanian football player and manager. He spent the majority of his career with Dinamo Tirana, having previously played for KF Erzeni and Puna Tirana, which is the modern day KF Tirana. As a coach, he was most noted for being in charge of the Albania national team between 1982 and 1985, and again between 1988 and 1989. He has also managed Albania U21, 17 Nëntori, Teuta Durrës and Shkumbini Peqin.

== Playing career ==
=== Club ===
A relatively successful forward for KF Erzeni, Puna Tirana, and Dinamo Tirana in the 1950s, he won four league titles with Dinamo Tirana.

=== International ===
He made his debut for Albania in a September 1957 friendly match away against China, his sole international game

== Managerial career ==
Rreli peaked as a coach of Albania national under-21 football team, which he led to two straight titles of the Balkan Youth Championship (in 1978 and 1981) and to the quarter finals of the Euro 1984, where Albania U21 was among the best 8 European teams.

As a coach, he won two straight Albania's titles in 1987-88 and 1988-89 with KF Tirana. He led Tirana to the best 16 in three European competitions (1986–87 European Cup Winners' Cup, 1988–89 European Cup, and 1989–90 European Cup). As Albania national football team coach he will be remembered for getting Albania close to qualifying in the Mexico 1986 campaign, most notably through a victory against Belgium and draws against Poland and Greece.

== Personal life ==
He was the father in law of Mirel Josa, another footballer and coach who married Rreli's daughter Brunilda.

He died on 31 December 2019.

== Honours ==
as a player

- Albanian Superliga: 4

1953, 1955, 1956, 1960

- Albanian Cup: 3

1953, 1954, 1960

as manager

- Albanian Superliga: 2

1988, 1989

For his achievements Rreli was awarded in 2007 the Mjeshter i Madh civil medal by then president of Albania Bamir Topi.
