= Safet Berisha =

Albanian footballer (1949–2016)

Personal information
- Full name: Safet Berisha
- Date of birth: 19 April 1949
- Place of birth: Durrës, Albania
- Date of death: 19 October 2016 (aged 66)
- Place of death: Arezzo, Italy
- Position: Centre back

Youth career
- –1965: Lokomotiva Durrës

Senior career*
Years	Team	Apps	(Gls)
1966–1968	Lokomotiva Durrës		
1968–1983	Partizani Tirana		

International career
1968–1971	Albania U23		
1970–1981	Albania	21	(0)
- * Club domestic league appearances and goals

Safet Berisha (11 November 1949 – 19 October 2016) was an Albanian football player who played for Lokomotiva Durrës and Partizani Tirana as well as the Albania national team, where he earned 20 senior caps.

== Club career ==
A tall defender, Berisha was raised in Durrës by his adoptive parents, which is where he joined the local side Lokomotiv Durrës as a youth player and was promoted to the senior squad by coach Loro Boriçi. In 1968 he was summoned to fulfil his military service and subsequently joined army club Partizani Tirana with whom he has won three championships, four cups and one Balkan Champion title.

== International career ==
He made his debut for Albania in a December 1970 European Championship qualification match against Turkey in Istanbul and earned a total of 21 caps, scoring no goals. His final international was a November 1981 FIFA World Cup qualification match against West Germany.

== Personal life ==
In 1992, he emigrated to Italy along with his family, firstly living in Bari for 6 years, then moving to Arezzo where he worked as an ambulance driver. He died in October 2016 in Italy after a short illness.

== Honours ==
Partizani Tirana

- Kategoria Superiore (3): 1970–71, 1978–79, 1980–81
- Kupa e Shqipërisë (3): 1969–70, 1972–73, 1979–80,
- Balkans Cup (1): 1970
