= Arben Minga =

Albanian footballer

Personal information
- Full name: Arben Minga
- Date of birth: 16 March 1959
- Place of birth: Tirana, Albania
- Date of death: 31 January 2007 (aged 47)
- Place of death: Windsor, Canada
- Height: 1.87 m (6 ft 2 in)
- Position: Striker

Youth career
- 1974–1975: 17 Nëntori Tirana

Senior career*
Years	Team	Apps	(Gls)
1975–1991	17 Nëntori Tirana	332	(133)
1991–1992	FC Brașov	17	(1)
1992–1993	Dacia Unirea Brăila	25	(3)
1993–1994	Acvila Giurgiu		
1994–1996	Tirana	55	(3)

International career
- Albania U21
1980–1989	Albania	28	(2)
- * Club domestic league appearances and goals

Arben Minga (16 March 1959 – 31 January 2007) was an Albanian professional footballer, who played as a striker and later in his final years as a centre-back.

He was known as Beni i modh (Big Ben).

== Club career ==
Born in Tirana, Albania, Minga began his career with KF Tirana, then known as 17 Nëntori, at the age of 15. He was well established in the senior squad by the 1977–78 season, making his competitive debut on 20 November 1977 in the match against Shkëndija Tiranë, while his first goal for the club came later on 2 April 1978 in the 3–1 win over Luftëtari Gjirokastër.

In the following years, Minga was also named team captain. In the 1980' Minga would be part of Tirana's golden generation along with players such as Agustin Kola, Mirel Josa, Sulejman Mema, Shkëlqim Muça, Bedri Omuri and Millan Baçi, winning four championships and three cups. He also received offers from Dinamo and Partizani to join them, and also friends and colleagues tried to convince him. Dinamo also offered him a very lucrative house which Minga turned down, saying: Thank you for evaluating me, but I cannot leave 17 Nëntori.

Minga was on top of his game during the 1985–86 season, netting 16 goals and helping Tirana to a third-place finish. One of his more notable games was the opening championship match against rivals of Partizani Tirana on 22 September where he scored a hat-trick to give Tirana a 7–3 win, the largest ever win against them.

In the early 1990s, Minga moved abroad to play in Romania in the 1992–1994. With Brăila he played in (and lost) the 1993 Romanian Cup Final. He came back to Tirana at the start of 1994–95 season, aged 35, also playing as a defender. Minga excelled in playing in his new role in the final two years, helping Tirana to win the championship both times.

In April 2020, Minga was voted by the fans as KF Tirana Player of the Century as part of their celebrations for the club's 100th anniversary.

== International career ==
Minga had a successful youth international career, winning Balkan Youth Championship twice in 1978 and 1981.

Minga has been capped 28 times by Albania senior squad, earning his first cap on 3 September 1980 in the 2–0 home win versus Finland valid for the 1982 FIFA World Cup qualification campaign. He played 20 games in European competitions and 12 FIFA World Cup qualification matches He played and scored in the famous December 1984 home win over Belgium and his final international was a March 1989 European Championship qualification match against England.

== Personal life ==
After returning to Albania in 1994, and despite still a professional footballer, Minga begun working as a representative of Gillette in Albania. The business eventually collapsed due to the 1997 Albanian civil unrest. Following that, Minga worked for a short time as a security employee at Tirana International Airport Nënë Tereza.

=== Canadian years and death ===
Minga subsequently went to Canada with his wife Nora Goxha, a former professional basketballer, where they raised two sons, Grid and Jon. It was there that he was diagnosed with a terminal illness. Minga died on 31 January 2007 in Windsor, Ontario of pancreatic cancer. Players in the 18th round of the 2006–07 Albanian Superliga games wore black armbands in his memory.

== Legacy ==
His friend and fellow footballer Mirel Josa remembered that he had his Tirana debut in 1981 because Minga was suspended. Josa discovered he had no boots to play in, but recalled that "Beni gave me his boots and said 'put them on and be careful because they never stop running'."

Shyqyri Rreli, his coach at KF Tirana called Minga: "The best captain and leader I ever had." Team-mate Millan Baçi added: "His shot was like a bullet." Meanwhile, his former colleague on the national side, Skënder Gega, labelled him "the hardest forward to defend against and the best person to have in your team". His one-time youth coach Fatmir Frashëri said: "I never heard him say 'I'm tired'. He would always be the first in for training and would give everything he had in every game."

A street in Tirana is named after him. Minga has also won several accolades and awards, such as "Merited Master of Sport", Honor of the city of Tirana" and "Honor of Albanian Sport".

== Career statistics ==
=== Goals in Albanian Championship ===
Season	Team	Goals
1976–77	17 Nëntori Tirana	1
1977–78	17 Nëntori Tirana	1
1978–79	17 Nëntori Tirana	3
1979–80	17 Nëntori Tirana	1
1980–81	17 Nëntori Tirana	7
1981–82	17 Nëntori Tirana	3
1982–83	17 Nëntori Tirana	4
1983–84	17 Nëntori Tirana	8
1984–85	17 Nëntori Tirana	13
1985–86	17 Nëntori Tirana	16
1986–87	17 Nëntori Tirana	11
1987–88	17 Nëntori Tirana	16
1988–89	17 Nëntori Tirana	9
1989–90	17 Nëntori Tirana	6
1990–91	17 Nëntori Tirana	3
1990–91	FC Brașov	1
1992–93	Dacia Unirea Brăila	3
1993–94	ASA Acvila Giurgiu	
1994–95	KF Tirana	2
1995–96	KF Tirana	1
Career total		109

=== International goals ===
Scores and results list Albania's goal tally first.

#	Date	Venue	Opponent	Score	Result	Competition
1.	22 December 1984	Qemal Stafa Stadium, Tirana, Albania	Belgium	2–0	2–0	1986 FIFA World Cup qualification
2.	18 January 1989	Qemal Stafa Stadium, Tirana, Albania	Greece	1–0	1–1	Friendly match

== Honours ==
=== Club ===
KF Tirana

- Albanian Superliga: 1981–82, 1984–85, 1987–88, 1994–95, 1995–96
- Albanian Cup: 1982–83, 1983–84, 1985–86, 1995–96
- Albanian Supercup: 1994;

Dacia Unirea Brăila

- Romanian Cup: runner-up 1992–93

=== International ===
Albania U21

- Balkan Youth Championship: 1978, 1981

=== Individual ===
- Albanian Superliga top goalscorer: 1984–85 season (shared with Faslli Fakja)

=== Orders ===
- Naim Frasheri Order: Second class
- KF Tirana Player of the Century
