= 1981–82 Albanian Cup =

Kupa e Shqipërisë

Tournament details
- Country: Albania

Final positions
- Champions: Dinamo Tirana
- Runners-up: 17 Nëntori

1981–82 Albanian Cup (Albanian: Kupa e Shqipërisë) was the thirtieth season of Albania's annual cup competition. It began in August 1981 with the First Round and ended in June 1982 with the Final matches. The winners of the competition qualified for the 1982-83 first round of the UEFA Cup. Vllaznia were the defending champions, having won their fourth Albanian Cup last season. The cup was won by Dinamo Tirana.

The rounds were played in a two-legged format similar to those of European competitions. If the aggregated score was tied after both games, the team with the higher number of away goals advanced. If the number of away goals was equal in both games, the match was decided by extra time and a penalty shootout, if necessary.

== First round ==
Games were played on August & September 1981*

- Results unknown

== Second round ==
In this round entered the 16 winners from the previous round. First and second legs were played in January 1982.

Team 1	Agg.	Team 2	1st leg	2nd leg
Luftëtari	4–2	31 Korriku	4–1	0–1
Labinoti	2–2 (4–3 p)	Lokomotiva Durrës	1–1	1–1
24 Maji	1–5	Dinamo Tirana	0–2	1–3
Naftëtari	2–0	Tomori	1–0	1–0
17 Nëntori	5–1	Apolonia	4–0	1–1
Besëlidhja	2–1	Vllaznia	1–0	1–1
Partizani	1–4	Skënderbeu	0–2	1–2
Besa	3–3 (a)	Flamurtari	3–1	0–2

== Quarter-finals ==
In this round entered the 8 winners from the previous round.

Team 1	Agg.	Team 2	1st leg	2nd leg
Luftëtari	2–2 (3–1 p)	Labinoti	1–1	1–1
Naftëtari	1–2	Dinamo Tirana	0–1	1–1
17 Nëntori	1–1 (4–2 p)	Besëlidhja	1–0	0–1
Flamurtari	4–1	Skënderbeu	4–1	0–0

== Semi-finals ==
In this round entered the four winners from the previous round.

Team 1	Agg.	Team 2	1st leg	2nd leg
17 Nëntori	4–1	Flamurtari	2–1	2–0
Luftëtari	0–2	Dinamo Tirana	0–2	0–0

== Finals ==
In this round entered the two winners from the previous round.

Team 1	Agg.	Team 2	1st leg	2nd leg
17 Nëntori	3–3 (a)	Dinamo Tirana	3–2	0–1

=== First leg ===
30 May 1982

17 Nëntori	3–2	Dinamo Tirana
Baçi 9' (pen.); Muça 42'; Mema 89'		Gega 6'; Zëri 29'

Qemal Stafa Stadium, Tirana
Referee: M. Lara

=== Second leg ===
6 June 1982

Dinamo Tirana	1–0	17 Nëntori
Zëri 37'

Qemal Stafa Stadium, Tirana
Referee: Dhori Prifti
