= Refik Resmja =

Albanian footballer

Personal information
- Full name: Refik Shaban Resmja
- Date of birth: 1 January 1931
- Place of birth: Tirana, Albania
- Date of death: 6 September 1997 (aged 66)
- Place of death: Tirana, Albania
- Position: Forward

Youth career
- 1946–1948: 17 Nëntori Tirana

Senior career*
Years	Team	Apps	(Gls)
1948–1950	17 Nëntori Tirana	10	(4)
1950–1964	Partizani Tirana	120	(180)
Total		130	(184)

International career
1952–1963	Albania	6	(1)

Managerial career
- 1967–1968: Partizani Tirana Youth
- 1971–1973: Lokomotiva Durrës
- 1971–1974: Albania U21
- * Club domestic league appearances and goals

Refik Shaban Resmja (1 January 1931 – 6 September 1997) was an Albanian professional footballer.

He started his career with Tirana, but shortly after signed with Partizani Tirana where he established himself as one of the greatest players of all time, setting several records and winning 9 trophies. He has also been an Albanian international, winning six caps between 1952 and 1963. During his career, Resmja held only one squad number, 11.

For three years he was also the manager of Albania under-21 squad.

== Early life ==
Resmja was born in Tirana from an ethnic Albanian family and started to play the game at a very young age along with his friends at "Xhamija Sherif" street (modern-day "Ali Demi Street"). He also used to go with his friends at Shallvare ground, playing and watching his club Tirana play. In his youth, Resmja dreamed of becoming a goalkeeper, idolizing players such as Niko Dovana or Giacomo Poselli.

== Club career ==
Resmja joined 17 Nëntori Tirana in 1946 where he was just 15 years old as a goalkeeper. He made his competitive debut on 28 February 1948 as a goalkeeper against Vllaznia Shkodër. His debut came as a result of goalkeeper Giacomo Poselli not appearing in the match and the staff selected Resmja to replace him. After beginning his career initially as a goalkeeper, Resmja was later converted into a forward. This happened during a training session with his teammate where Resmja preferred to play as a forward, surprising everyone with his moves, which eventually made him left the position as goalkeeper. He played with Tirana until October 1950.

On 20 October 1950, he was forced to join military by communist regime and eventually signed with the army team Partizani Tirana where he played until the end of his career. In the 1951 Albanian Superliga, Resmja recorded an astonishing 59 goals in just 23 matches, averaging 2,57 goals per match, the highest ratio in history of football. He also scored 10 hat-tricks, setting the record for most hat-tricks scored in the history of Albanian Superliga, a record which still stands. Resmja also become the only player in the history of Albanian football to score six and seven goals in one match; the striker reached the feat in the matches versus Puna Berat (14–0), Puna Fier (11–0), Spartaku Qyteti Stalin (9–0) and Puna Gjirokastër (8–0).

Despite scoring this much, Resmja's goals were not enough to secure Partizani the title which was won by fellow capital club Dinamo Tirana. Resmja also played a match as a loanee for his first club 17 Nëntori Tirana in May 1951, a friendly against a Selection of Hungarians Unions. He scored in this match, marking thus his first goal against a foreign team.

Over the course of next years, Resmja wasn't able to reach or break his scoring record, but was able to finish top scorer in five other occasions. He would also set the record for most goals (14) scored in the derby against Tirana. He won his first championship in the 1954 season, scoring 13 goals which were instrumental for the team which topped the league 7 points ahead of Dinamo Tirana.

Resmja was named captain in 1957. In the following year, he played in the Spartakiad tournament, an official championship of communist countries army clubs, in Leipzig, as Partizani went to the final where they were defeated by CDNA Sofia. Resmja was decisive for the team throughout the campaign, netting a brace in the 5–1 win over Vietnam's The Cong Hanoi and a goal in extra-time against Dukla Prague. His performances led Resmja to being named the best player of the tournament. Five years later, Resmja played again in this competition but wasn't able to score as Partizani finished runner-up again, this time losing to XI CSKA/SKA.

In the 1963–64 season, Resmja captained Partizani to another championship, his sixth in career, despite scoring only once the whole season. He lifted the trophy and at the end of the season. He decided to end his playing career at the age of 33 years old, having scored 184 goals in just 130 league matches which made him the all-time top scorer of Albanian Superliga at that time. Since then, his record was eclipsed by Vioresin Sinani and Daniel Xhafaj.

== International career ==
Despite having great individual and collective success at club level, Resmja's international career was tepid as he collected only six appearances and scored once. He earned his first cap on 29 November 1952 in the 3–2 friendly win versus Czechoslovakia. He scored his first goal in his third cap, netting the second of a 2–0 home win over Poland. Resmja earned his final cap on 2 June 1963 in a 1–0 home loss to Bulgaria for the 1964 Summer Olympics qualifying phase which was also his first competitive match.

== Managerial career ==
Resmja's managerial career begun with Partizani Tirana Youth in 1967 as he liked to work with the younger players. He stayed there until 1968, and restarted the work again in 1971 by managing Lokomotiva Durrës (modern day Teuta Durrës). In the meantime he also coached Albania under-21 squad.

== Style of play ==
Refik Resmja is worthy of playing alongside the great Ferenc Puskás

— Former Hungarian coach Gusztáv Sebes after seeing Resmja play during a match.

Refik Resmja is great among the greatest

— Former Bulgarian international Stefan Bozhkov.

In his career, Resmja was distinguished for his strong physique, and agility which made him a target for the defenders. A predominantly a left footed player, Resmja is known to have scored most of his goals with it, some of them from outside the penalty area. His short and athletic stature made Resmja a great dribbler which allowed him to get past most of the challenges he got in the field. Resmja had also been noted for his stamina, work rate and accurate passing. The most well-known ability of Resmja was his scoring instinct, attacking movement and positioning inside the penalty area. Resmja was also a fair play player, receiving not a single red card during his 16-year career.

== Legacy ==
A street in Shishtufinë in Tirana County is named in his honour. In 2016, he was decorated with the Honor of Nation Order by president Bujar Nishani for his contributions to Albanian football. He also hold numerous awards and accolades, such as Naim Frashëri Gold Medal, Naim Frashëri Order, Ylli i Kuq Order (sq.) and Medalje e Punës (Medal of Work) etc.

== Career statistics ==
=== Goals in Albanian Championship ===
Season	Team	Goals
1948	Tirana	1*
1949	Tirana	2*
1950	Tirana	1*
1951	Partizani	59
1952	Partizani	17*
1953	Partizani	9*
1954	Partizani	13*
1955	Partizani	23
1956	Partizani	17
1957	Partizani	12
1958	Partizani	7
1959	Partizani	6
1960	Partizani	7
1961	Partizani	5
1962–63	Partizani	4
1963–64	Partizani	1
TOTAL		184*

* - Incomplete data

=== International ===
Appearances and goals by national team and year
National team	Year	Apps	Goals
Albania	1952	2	0
Albania	1953	1	1
Albania	1954	0	0
Albania	1955	0	0
Albania	1956	0	0
Albania	1957	1	0
Albania	1958	1	0
Albania	1959	0	0
Albania	1960	0	0
Albania	1961	0	0
Albania	1962	0	0
Albania	1963	1	0
Total		6	1

=== International goals ===
Albania score listed first, score column indicates score after each Resmja goal.

International goals by date, venue, cap, opponent, score, result and competition
No.	Date	Venue	Cap	Opponent	Score	Result	Competition
1	29 November 1953	Qemal Stafa Stadium, Tirana, Albania	3	Poland	2–0	2–0	Friendly

== Honours ==
=== Club ===
Partizani Tirana

- Albanian Superliga: 1954, 1957, 1958, 1959, 1961, 1962–63, 1963–64
- Albanian Cup: 1957, 1958, 1961

=== Individual ===
- Albanian Superliga top goalscorer: 1951, 1952, 1953, 1954, 1955, 1956
- Spartakiad/Championship of Communist Countries Army Clubs Player of the tournament: 1958
- Seasonwise World Top Scorer: 1951

=== Records ===
- Top goalscorer in the history of Partizani Tirana: 180 goals
- Top goalscorer in the capital derby: 14 goals
- Most goals scored in one season in the Albanian Superliga: 59 goals in 1951
- Most hat-tricks scored in one season in the Albanian Superliga: 10 hat-tricks in 1951
- Most hat-tricks scored in the history of Albanian Superliga: 10 hat-tricks
- Highest goal-per-game ratio in a season: 2,57
- The player with the most top goalscorer awards of Albanian Superliga: 6 (shared with Ilir Përnaska)

== See also ==
- List of footballers who achieved hat-trick records
