= Shyqyri Ballgjini =

Albanian footballer (born 1954)

Personal information
- Full name: Shyqyri Ballgjini
- Date of birth: 14 March 1954 (age 72)
- Place of birth: Durrës, Albania
- Position: Striker

Senior career*
Years	Team	Apps	(Gls)
1973–1978	Dinamo Tirana		
1978–1979	Vllaznia		
1979–1984	Dinamo Tirana		

International career^{‡}
1981	Albania	2	(0)
- * Club domestic league appearances and goals as of 20 August 2015 ‡ National team caps and goals as of 20 August 2015

Shyqyri Ballgjini (born 14 March 1954) is an Albanian former footballer, who spent most of his career, except one season, playing with Dinamo Tirana, as well as Albania. During his career, Ballgjini has scored more than 100 league goals and more than 50 Republic cup goals.

== Club career ==
He was part of the 'Golden Age' of Dinamo, forming a successful offensive partnership Vasillaq Zëri and Ilir Përnaska which is considered to be the best offensive trio in Dinamo's history. During 1978–79, he played for Vllaznia Shkodër. He returned to Dinamo in 1979 where he stayed until 1984, the year he decided to end his football career.

Ballgjini was honored with the title "Legend of Albanian football", a title which is received by a total of 5–6 players. He is on the list of the 100 best Albanian players of all time.

== International career ==
He made his debut for Albania in an April 1981 FIFA World Cup qualification match against West Germany and earned a total of 2 caps, scoring no goals. His second and final international was a September 1981 FIFA World Cup qualification match against Finland.

== Personal life ==
His younger brother Haxhi Ballgjini also played for Albania and they were the first brothers to play for the national side together in 1981 against Finland.

== Honours ==
=== Clubs ===
Dinamo Tirana

- Albanian Superliga (5): 1972–73, 1974–75, 1975–76, 1976–77, 1979–80
- Albanian Cup (2): 1973–74, 1977–78
- Spartakiada Kombëtare (1): 1974
- Kupa e Ushtrisë Popullore (2): 1973, 1978

=== Individual ===
- Legend of Albanian Football.
