= 1975–76 Albanian Cup =

Kupa e Shqipërisë

Tournament details
- Country: Albania

Final positions
- Champions: 17 Nëntori
- Runners-up: KS Skenderbeu Korce

1975–76 Albanian Cup (Albanian: Kupa e Shqipërisë) was the twenty-fourth season of Albania's annual cup competition. It began in August 1975 with the First Round and ended in May 1976 with the Final matches. The winners of the competition qualified for the 1976-77 first round of the UEFA Cup. Labinoti were the defending champions, having won their first Albanian Cup last season. The cup was won by 17 Nëntori.

The rounds were played in a two-legged format similar to those of European competitions. If the aggregated score was tied after both games, the team with the higher number of away goals advanced. If the number of away goals was equal in both games, the match was decided by extra time and a penalty shootout, if necessary.

== First round ==
Games were played on August & September 1975*

- Results unknown

== Second round ==
All sixteen teams of the 1974–75 Superliga and First Division entered in this round. First and second legs were played in January 1976.

Team 1	Agg.	Team 2	1st leg	2nd leg
Punëtori	2–2 (p)	Lokomotiva Durrës	1–1	1–1
Flamurtari	2–2 (p)	Labinoti	1–0	1–2
Besëlidhja	0–4	Partizani	0–1	0–3
Luftëtari	0–1	Besa	0–0	0–1
Skënderbeu	4–0	Traktori	1–0	3–0
Dajti	0–6	Vllaznia	0–1	0–5
17 Nëntori	5–0	Naftëtari	2–0	3–0
Dinamo Tirana	3–0	Shkëndija Tirana	3–0	0–0

== Quarter-finals ==
In this round entered the 8 winners from the previous round.

Team 1	Agg.	Team 2	1st leg	2nd leg
Dinamo Tirana	2–1	Vllaznia	1–1	1–0
Besa	1–2	Skënderbeu	1–0	0–2
Partizani	0–1	17 Nëntori	0–0	0–1
Lokomotiva Durrës	1–0	Labinoti	1–0	0–0

== Semi-finals ==
In this round entered the four winners from the previous round.

Team 1	Agg.	Team 2	1st leg	2nd leg
Dinamo Tirana	2–3	Skënderbeu	2–1	0–2
Lokomotiva Durrës	1–2	17 Nëntori	0–1	1–1

== Final ==
In this round entered the two winners from the previous round.

Team 1	Agg.	Team 2	1st leg	2nd leg
17 Nëntori	4–1	Skënderbeu	3–1	1–0

=== First leg ===
14 March 1976

17 Nëntori	3–1	Skënderbeu
Gëzdari 23', 37', 79'		Xhambazi 32'

Qemal Stafa Stadium, Tirana
Attendance: 16,000
Referee: P. Doko

=== Second leg ===
21 March 1976

Skënderbeu	0–1	17 Nëntori
		Gëzdari 17'

Skënderbeu Stadium, Korçë
Attendance: 10,000
Referee: A. Hoxha
