= 1983–84 Albanian Cup =

Kupa e Shqipërisë

Tournament details
- Country: Albania

Final positions
- Champions: 17 Nëntori
- Runners-up: Flamurtari

1983–84 Albanian Cup (Albanian: Kupa e Shqipërisë) was the thirty-second season of Albania's annual cup competition. It began in August 1983 with the first round and ended in June 1984 with the final match. The winners of the competition qualified for the 1984-85 first round of the UEFA Cup. 17 Nëntori were the defending champions, having won their fifth Albanian Cup last season. The cup was won by 17 Nëntori.

The rounds were played in a two-legged format similar to those of European competitions. If the aggregated score was tied after both games, the team with the higher number of away goals advanced. If the number of away goals was equal in both games, the match was decided by extra time and a penalty shootout, if necessary.

== First round ==
Games were played on August & September 1983.

Team 1	Agg.	Team 2	1st leg	2nd leg
Korabi	3–4	Labinoti	3–2	0–2
Besëlidhja	2–1	Luftëtari	1–0	1–1
Tërbuni	2–6	17 Nëntori	1–2	1–4
Turbina	3–10	Vllaznia	2–4	1–6
Shkumbini	2–3	Lokomotiva Durrës	2–3	0–0
Erzeni	3–2	Naftëtari	2–0	1–2
Përparimi	3–5	Skënderbeu	3–1	0–4
Kastrioti	5–4	Traktori	4–1	1–3
Butrinti	1–4	Partizani	1–1	0–3
Shkëndija Tiranë	1–4	31 Korriku	0–0	1–4
Dajti	0–10	Dinamo Tirana	0–4	0–6
Minatori Tepelena	2–3	Tomori	2–0	0–3
24 Maji	3–5	Flamurtari	3–0	0–5
Vetëtima	1–1 (a)	Dinamo Shpresa U-21	0–0	1–1
Punëtori	4–7	Besa	2–4	2–3
Bistrica	3–7	Apolonia	3–1	0–6

== Second round ==
All sixteen teams of the 1982–83 Superliga and First Division entered in this round. First and second legs were played in January 1984.

Team 1	Agg.	Team 2	1st leg	2nd leg
Labinoti	1–2	Besëlidhja	1–2	0–0
Partizani	5–2	31 Korriku	1–1	4–1
Dinamo Tirana	0–1	Vllaznia	0–0	0–1
Tomori	2–3	17 Nëntori	1–0	1–3
Vetëtima	2–7	Lokomotiva Durrës	1–3	1–4
Erzeni	1–2	Flamurtari	1–0	0–2
Kastrioti	2–3	Skënderbeu	2–1	0–2
Apolonia	3–2	Besa	1–0	2–2

== Quarter-finals ==
In this round entered the 8 winners from the previous round.

Team 1	Agg.	Team 2	1st leg	2nd leg
Partizani	2–1	Besëlidhja	2–1	0–0
Vllaznia	1–3	17 Nëntori	0–1	1–2
Apolonia	1–0	Skënderbeu	0–0	1–0
Flamurtari	2–1	Lokomotiva Durrës	2–0	0–1

== Semi-finals ==
In this round entered the four winners from the previous round.

Team 1	Agg.	Team 2	1st leg	2nd leg
Flamurtari	3–1	Partizani	2–0	1–1
Apolonia	1–5	17 Nëntori	0–1	1–4

== Final ==
10 June 1984

17 Nëntori	2–1	Flamurtari
Minga 14'; Muça 44'		Ruci 12'

Vojo Kushi Stadium, Shkodër
Attendance: 16,000
Referee: Arseni Hoxha
