= 1974–75 Albanian Cup =

Kupa e Shqipërisë

Tournament details
- Country: Albania

Final positions
- Champions: Labinoti
- Runners-up: Lokomotiva Durrës

1974–75 Albanian Cup (Albanian: Kupa e Shqipërisë) was the twenty-third season of Albania's annual cup competition. It began in August 1974 with the First Round and ended in May 1975 with the Final matches. The winners of the competition qualified for the 1975-76 first round of the UEFA Cup. Dinamo Tirana were the defending champions, having won their eighth Albanian Cup last season. The cup was won by Labinoti.

The rounds were played in a two-legged format similar to those of European competitions. If the aggregated score was tied after both games, the team with the higher number of away goals advanced. If the number of away goals was equal in both games, the match was decided by extra time and a penalty shootout, if necessary.

== First round ==
Games were played on August & September 1974*

- Results unknown

== Second round ==
In this round entered the 16 winners from the previous round. First and second legs were played in January 1975.

| Team 1 | Agg. | Team 2 | 1st leg | 2nd leg |
|---|---|---|---|---|
| 17 Nëntori | 2–3 | Lokomotiva Durrës | 2–0 | 0–3 |
| Partizani | 7–2 | Besa | 6–0 | 1–2 |
| Punëtori | 0–4 | Luftëtari | 0–1 | 0–3 |
| Vllaznia | 2–3 | Dinamo Tirana | 1–0 | 1–3 |
| Labinoti | 2–0 | Naftëtari | 0–0 | 2–0 |
| Flamurtari | 2–1 | Traktori | 1–0 | 1–1 |
| Skënderbeu | 1–2 | Shkëndija Tiranë | 0–0 | 1–2 |
| Apolonia | 1–2 | Besëlidhja | 0–0 | 1–2 |

== Quarter-finals ==
In this round entered the 8 winners from the previous round.

| Team 1 | Agg. | Team 2 | 1st leg | 2nd leg |
|---|---|---|---|---|
| Dinamo Tirana | 1–2 | Partizani | 1–2 | 0–0 |
| Besëlidhja | 1–1 (p) | Luftëtari | 1–0 | 0–1 |
| Lokomotiva Durrës | 2–1 | Shkëndija Tiranë | 2–0 | 0–1 |
| Flamurtari | 3–5 | Labinoti | 2–1 | 1–4 |

== Semi-finals ==
In this round entered the four winners from the previous round.

| Team 1 | Agg. | Team 2 | 1st leg | 2nd leg |
|---|---|---|---|---|
| Labinoti | 3–0 | Partizani | 1–0 | 2–0 |
| Besëlidhja | 0–1 | Lokomotiva Durrës | 0–0 | 0–1 |

== Finals ==
In this round entered the two winners from the previous round.

| Team 1 | Agg. | Team 2 | 1st leg | 2nd leg |
|---|---|---|---|---|
| Lokomotiva Durrës | 0–2 | Labinoti | 0–1 | 0–1 |

=== First leg ===
9 March 1975

| Lokomotiva Durrës | 0–1 | Labinoti |
|---|---|---|
| | | Hysi 13' |

Lokomotiva Stadium, Durrës
Attendance: 15,000
Referee: T. Kalaçi

=== Second leg ===
16 March 1975

| Labinoti | 1–0 | Lokomotiva Durrës |
|---|---|---|
| Mitrollari 87' |

Rudi Bizhuta Stadium, Elbasan
Referee: R. Pregja
