= 1965–66 Albanian Cup =

Kupa e Shqipërisë

Tournament details
- Country: Albania

Final positions
- Champions: Partizani
- Runners-up: Vllaznia

1965–66 Albanian Cup (Albanian: Kupa e Shqipërisë) was the sixteenth season of Albania's annual cup competition. It began in August 1965 with the First Round and ended in May 1966 with the Final matches. Vllaznia were the defending champions, having won their first Albanian Cup last season. The cup was won by Partizani.

The rounds were played in a two-legged format similar to those of European competitions. If the aggregated score was tied after both games, the team with the higher number of away goals advanced. If the number of away goals was equal in both games, the match was decided by extra time and a penalty shootout, if necessary.

== First round ==
Games were played in August 1965*

- Results unknown

== Second round ==
In this round entered the 16 winners from the previous round. First and second legs were played in January 1966.

Team 1	Agg.	Team 2	1st leg	2nd leg
Partizani	4–2	Dinamo Tirana	1–2	3–0
Tomori	3–5	Vllaznia	1–2	2–3
Labinoti	5–4	Traktori	3–1	2–3
Erzeni	1–6	Skënderbeu	0–1	1–5
17 Nëntori	9–0	Punëtori	5–0	4–0
Lokomotiva Durrës	5–3	Naftëtari	1–1	4–2
Besa	3–1	Apolonia	3–1	0–0
Flamurtari	5–0	Kastrioti	5–0	0–0

== Quarter-finals ==
In this round entered the 8 winners from the previous round.

Team 1	Agg.	Team 2	1st leg	2nd leg
Labinoti	1–2	Partizani	0–2	1–0
Besa	0–3	Vllaznia	0–0	0–3
Flamurtari	0–2	Skënderbeu	0–0	0–2
17 Nëntori	5–2	Lokomotiva Durrës	3–0	2–2

== Semi-finals ==
In this round entered the four winners from the previous round.

Team 1	Agg.	Team 2	1st leg	2nd leg
17 Nëntori	2–3	Partizani	0–2	2–1
Skënderbeu	1–3	Vllaznia	1–1	0–2

== Finals ==
In this round entered the two winners from the previous round.

Team 1	Agg.	Team 2	1st leg	2nd leg
Vllaznia	4–6	Partizani	1–2	3–4

=== First leg ===
6 March 1966

Vllaznia	1–2	Partizani
Lekaj 73'		Jashari 14'; Shllaku 40'

Vojo Kushi Stadium, Shkodër
Attendance: 10,000
Referee: R. Kuka

=== Second leg ===
13 March 1966

Partizani	4–3	Vllaznia
Dizdari 45'; Jashari 55'; Haxhiu 61'; Shllaku 75'		Puka 4'; Rakiqi 50' (pen.); Dani 77'

Qemal Stafa Stadium, Tirana
Attendance: 16,000
Referee: R. Pregja
