= 1980–81 Albanian Cup =

Kupa e Shqipërisë

Tournament details
- Country: Albania

Final positions
- Champions: Vllaznia
- Runners-up: Besa

1980–81 Albanian Cup (Albanian: Kupa e Shqipërisë) was the twenty-ninth season of Albania's annual cup competition. It began in August 1980 with the First Round and ended in June 1981 with the Final matches. The winners of the competition qualified for the 1981-82 first round of the UEFA Cup. Partizani were the defending champions, having won their eleventh Albanian Cup last season. The cup was won by Vllaznia.

The rounds were played in a two-legged format similar to those of European competitions. If the aggregated score was tied after both games, the team with the higher number of away goals advanced. If the number of away goals was equal in both games, the match was decided by extra time and a penalty shootout, if necessary.

== First round ==
Games were played on August & September 1980*

- Results unknown

== Second round ==
In this round entered the 16 winners from the previous round. First and second legs were played in January 1981.

Team 1	Agg.	Team 2	1st leg	2nd leg
Naftëtari	3–2	Partizani	3–1	0–1
Labinoti	2–0	Luftëtari	2–0	0–0
Dinamo Tirana	2–1	Tomori	0–0	2–1
Vllaznia	2–1	Besëlidhja	1–1	1–0
Flamurtari	1–1	24 Maji	0–0	1–1
Lokomotiva Durrës	5–0	Traktori	3–0	2–0
17 Nëntori	4–2	Shkëndija Tiranë	4–2	0–0
Skënderbeu	0–4	Besa	0–0	0–4

== Quarter-finals ==
In this round entered the 8 winners from the previous round.

Team 1	Agg.	Team 2	1st leg	2nd leg
Labinoti	3–0	Naftëtari	3–0	0–0
Dinamo Tirana	2–4	Vllaznia	1–1	1–3
Flamurtari	3–1	Lokomotiva Durrës	2–1	1–0
Besa	1–1 (a)	17 Nëntori	0–0	1–1

== Semi-finals ==
In this round entered the four winners from the previous round.

Team 1	Agg.	Team 2	1st leg	2nd leg
Besa	2–2 (a)	Labinoti	1–0	1–2
Flamurtari	1–2	Vllaznia	1–1	0–1

== Finals ==
In this round entered the two winners from the previous round.

Team 1	Agg.	Team 2	1st leg	2nd leg
Besa	3–6	Vllaznia	2–1	1–5

=== First leg ===
10 June 1981

Besa	2–1	Vllaznia
Shtini 26'; Mullaliu 76'		Gruda 39'

Besa Stadium, Kavajë
Attendance: 15,000
Referee: Hiqmet Kuka

=== Second leg ===
14 June 1981

Vllaznia	5–1	Besa
Luçi 55'; Hafizi 57', 83'; Gruda 78'; Duraj 86'		Shtini 43'

Vojo Kushi Stadium, Shkodër
Attendance: 15,000
Referee: Arseni Hoxha
