= 1967–68 Albanian Cup =

Kupa e Shqipërisë

Tournament details
- Country: Albania

Final positions
- Champions: Partizani
- Runners-up: Vllaznia

1967–68 Albanian Cup (Albanian: Kupa e Shqipërisë) was the seventeenth season of Albania's annual cup competition. It began in August 1967 with the First Round and ended in May 1968 with the Final match. Partizani were the defending champions, having won their seventh Albanian Cup last season. The cup was won by Partizani.

The rounds were played in a one-legged format similar to those of European competitions. If the number of goals was equal, the match was decided by extra time and a penalty shootout, if necessary.

== First round ==
Games were played in August 1967*

- Results unknown

== Second round ==
In this round entered the 16 winners from the previous round. First and second legs were played in January 1968.

Team 1	Score	Team 2
Naftëtari	0–1	Ylli i Kuq
Luftëtari	2–1	Tomori
Apolonia	0–1	Kastrioti
Partizani	2–1	Flamurtari
Vllaznia	3–0	Dinamo Tirana
Skënderbeu	0–2	Traktori
Labinoti	1–1 (p)	Lokomotiva Durrës
17 Nëntori	1–0	Besa

== Quarter-finals ==
In this round entered the 8 winners from the previous round.

Team 1	Score	Team 2
17 Nëntori	3–1	Labinoti
Traktori	2–4	Vllaznia
Kastrioti	0–7	Partizani
Ylli i Kuq	0–1	Luftëtari

== Semi-finals ==
In this round entered the four winners from the previous round.

Team 1	Score	Team 2
Vllaznia	1–0	17 Nëntori
Luftëtari	1–4	Partizani

== Final ==
10 March 1968

Partizani	4–1	Vllaznia
Pano 2', 15', 65'; Shllaku 55'		Rragami 63'

Qemal Stafa Stadium, Tirana
Attendance: 18,000
Referee: F. Bajrami
