= Shkëlqim Muça =

Albanian footballer and coach

Personal information
- Full name: Shkëlqim Muça
- Date of birth: 19 March 1960 (age 66)
- Place of birth: Tirana, PR Albania
- Position: Midfielder

Youth career
- 1975–1978: 17 Nëntori Tirana

Senior career*
| Years | Team | Apps | (Gls) |
| 1978–1989 | 17 Nëntori Tirana | 192 | (87) |

International career
| 1982–1989 | Albania | 16 | (2) |

Managerial career
- 1994–1995: Tirana
- 1996–1998: Teuta Durrës
- 1998–1999: Besa Kavajë
- 1999–2000: Tirana
- 2001–2002: Tirana
- 2005: Tirana
- 2006–2007: Tirana
- 2009–2010: Dinamo Tirana
- 2010–2011: Skënderbeu Korçë
- 2011–2012: Flamurtari Vlorë
- 2014: Kukësi (Technical Director)
- 2015: Tirana
- 2016–: Partizani (Director Multisportes)
- * Club domestic league appearances and goals

Shkëlqim Muça (born 19 March 1960) is an Albanian football coach and former player.

== Playing career ==
=== Club ===
He created the attacking trio Muça-Minga-Kola at Nëntori Tirana. All three players combined have scored around 400 goals for Tirana in little more than a decade.

Muça has won several championships and Albanian cups with Tirana as a footballer and as a coach.

=== International ===
He made his debut for Albania in a September 1982 European Championship qualification match away at Austria and earned a total of 16 caps, scoring 2 goals. He played in the famous December 1984 home win over Belgium and his final international was an October 1987 European Championship qualification match against Romania.

== Managerial career ==
Muça has had one of the most successful coaching careers in the post '90 footballistic Albania, first as Tirana and Dinamo then as Flamurtari Vlorë coach.

He obtained the FIFA coaching license in May 2008.

== Director career ==
In December 2015, Muça was employed as club chief by Partizani Tirana.

== Honours ==
=== Player ===
Tirana

- Albanian Superliga: 1981–82, 1984–85, 1987–88, 1988–89
- Albanian Cup: 1982–83, 1983–84

=== Manager ===
Tirana

- Albanian Superliga: 1994–95, 1995–96, 1998–99, 1999–2000, 2002–03, 2003–04, 2004–05, 2006–07
- Albanian Cup: 1995–96, 2000–01, 2001–02, 2005–06

Dinamo Tirana

- Albanian Superliga: 2009–10

Skënderbeu Korçë

- Albanian Superliga: 2010–11
