= 1971–72 Albanian Cup =

Kupa e Shqipërisë

Tournament details
- Country: Albania

Final positions
- Champions: Vllaznia
- Runners-up: Besa

1971–72 Albanian Cup (Albanian: Kupa e Shqipërisë) was the twentieth season of Albania's annual cup competition. It began in August 1971 with the First Round and ended in May 1972 with the Final matches. Dinamo Tirana were the defending champions, having won their seventh Albanian Cup last season. The cup was won by Vllaznia.

The rounds were played in a two-legged format similar to those of European competitions. If the aggregated score was tied after both games, the team with the higher number of away goals advanced. If the number of away goals was equal in both games, the match was decided by extra time and a penalty shootout, if necessary.

== First round ==
Games were played in August 1971*

- Results unknown

== Second round ==
In this round entered the 16 winners from the previous round. First and second legs were played in January 1972.

| Team 1 | Agg. | Team 2 | 1st leg | 2nd leg |
|---|---|---|---|---|
| Besa | 7–2 | Traktori | 6–0 | 1–2 |
| Partizani | 5–1 | Studenti | 3–1 | 2–0 |
| Flamurtari | 1–2 | Tomori | 0–0 | 1–2 |
| Lokomotiva Durrës | 2–3 | Skënderbeu | 2–0 | 0–3 |
| Besëlidhja | 0–2 | Dinamo Tirana | 0–1 | 0–1 |
| Luftëtari | 0–5 | 17 Nëntori | 0–2 | 0–3 |
| Shkëndija Tiranë | 1–6 | Labinoti | 0–3 | 1–3 |
| Apolonia | 0–9 | Vllaznia | 0–3 | 0–6 |

== Quarter-finals ==
In this round entered the 8 winners from the previous round.

| Team 1 | Agg. | Team 2 | 1st leg | 2nd leg |
|---|---|---|---|---|
| Besa | 6–0 | 17 Nëntori | 3–0 | 3–0 |
| Dinamo Tirana | 4–1 | Labinoti | 2–0 | 2–1 |
| Vllaznia | 5–2 | Skënderbeu | 3–0 | 2–2 |
| Partizani | 6–1 | Tomori | 4–1 | 2–0 |

== Semi-finals ==
In this round entered the four winners from the previous round.

| Team 1 | Agg. | Team 2 | 1st leg | 2nd leg |
|---|---|---|---|---|
| Besa | 1–1 (p) | Dinamo Tirana | 0–0 | 1–1 |
| Vllaznia | 3–2 | Partizani | 1–1 | 2–1 |

== Finals ==
In this round entered the two winners from the previous round.

| Team 1 | Agg. | Team 2 | 1st leg | 2nd leg |
|---|---|---|---|---|
| Besa | 2–2 (3–5 p) | Vllaznia | 2–0 | 0–2 |

=== First leg ===
23 April 1972

| Besa | 2–0 | Vllaznia |
|---|---|---|
| Qerolli 87'; Kashami 89' |

Besa Stadium, Kavajë
Referee: F. Bajrami

=== Second leg ===
1 May 1972

| Vllaznia | 2–0 (a.e.t.) | Besa |
|---|---|---|
| Rragami 31' (pen.), 54' (pen.) |
Penalties
| | 5–3 |

Vojo Kushi Stadium, Shkodër
Attendance: 14,000
Referee: R. Pregja
