= 1962–63 Albanian Cup =

Kupa e Shqipërisë

Tournament details
- Country: Albania

Final positions
- Champions: 17 Nëntori
- Runners-up: Besa

1962–63 Albanian Cup (Albanian: Kupa e Shqipërisë) was the thirteenth season of Albania's annual cup competition. It began in August 1962 with the First Round and ended in May 1963 with the Final matches. Partizani were the defending champions, having won their fifth Albanian Cup last season.

The cup was won by 17 Nëntori.

The rounds were played in a two-legged format similar to those of European competitions. If the aggregated score was tied after both games, the team with the higher number of away goals advanced. If the number of away goals was equal in both games, the match was decided by extra time and a penalty shootout, if necessary.

== First round ==
Games were played on August & September 1962*

- Results unknown

== Second round ==
All sixteen teams of the Albanian Superliga and First Division entered in this round. First and second legs were played in January 1963.

Team 1	Agg.	Team 2	1st leg	2nd leg
Erzeni	0–8	Partizani	0–2	0–6
Dinamo Tirana	1–2	Skënderbeu	0–1	1–1
Vllaznia	4–0	Tomori	3–0	1–0
Flamurtari	3–0	Labinoti	3–0	0–0
Traktori	1–5	17 Nëntori	0–3	1–2
Lokomotiva Durrës	3–0	Luftëtari	2–0	1–0
Apolonia	3–3 (25–24 p)	Korabi	2–1	1–2
Shkumbini	1–10	Besa	1–3	0–7

== Quarter finals ==
In this round entered the 8 winners from the previous round.

Team 1	Agg.	Team 2	1st leg	2nd leg
17 Nëntori	2–0	Vllaznia	1–0	1–0
Lokomotiva Durrës	1–6	Partizani	0–1	1–5
Apolonia	2–3	Besa	0–1	2–2
Skënderbeu	2–1	Flamurtari	1–1	1–0

== Semifinals ==
In this round entered the four winners from the previous round.

Team 1	Agg.	Team 2	1st leg	2nd leg
Skënderbeu	1–2	Besa	1–1	0–1
17 Nëntori	2–0	Partizani	1–0	1–0

== Finals ==
In this round entered the two winners from the previous round.

Team 1	Agg.	Team 2	1st leg	2nd leg
17 Nëntori	3–3 (5–3 p)	Besa	2–3	1–0

=== First leg ===
31 March 1963

17 Nëntori	2–3	Besa
Mema 55'; Gjoka 61'		Dimroçi 6'; I. Ikonomi 35' (o.g.); Lilamani 78'

Qemal Stafa Stadium, Tirana
Referee: S. Kotherja

=== Second leg ===
7 April 1963

Besa	0–1	17 Nëntori
		Ishka 12'
Penalties
	3–5

Besa Stadium, Kavajë
Referee: J. Godari
