= 1992–93 Albanian Cup =

Kupa e Shqipërisë

Tournament details
- Country: Albania

Final positions
- Champions: Partizani
- Runners-up: Albpetrol

1992–93 Albanian Cup (Albanian: Kupa e Shqipërisë) was the forty-first season of Albania's annual cup competition. It began in August 1992 with the First Round and ended in May 1993 with the Final match. The winners of the competition qualified for the 1993-94 first round of the UEFA Cup. Elbasani were the defending champions, having won their second Albanian Cup last season. The cup was won by Partizani.

The first round was played in a single round-robin matches within 8 qualifying groups. The other rounds were played in a two-legged format similar to those of European competitions. If the aggregated score was tied after both games, the team with the higher number of away goals advanced. If the number of away goals was equal in both games, the match was decided by extra time and a penalty shootout, if necessary.

== First round ==
Games were played on August & September 1992

=== Group 1 ===
| Pos | Team | Pld | W | D | L | GF | GA | GD | Pts | Qualification |
|---|---|---|---|---|---|---|---|---|---|---|
| 1 | Vllaznia | 3 | 3 | 0 | 0 | 6 | 0 | +6 | 6 | Advance to second round |
| 2 | Sopoti | 3 | 1 | 1 | 1 | 3 | 3 | 0 | 3 | Advance to second round |
| 3 | Tomori | 3 | 1 | 1 | 1 | 3 | 3 | 0 | 3 | Advance to second round |
| 4 | Valbona | 3 | 0 | 0 | 3 | 0 | 6 | −6 | 0 | |

Source: Calciomondialeweb.it
Rules for classification: 1) points; 2) goal difference; 3) number of goals scored.

=== Group 2 ===
| Pos | Team | Pld | W | D | L | GF | GA | GD | Pts | Qualification |
|---|---|---|---|---|---|---|---|---|---|---|
| 1 | Partizani | 3 | 3 | 0 | 0 | 8 | 1 | +7 | 6 | Advance to second round |
| 2 | Albpetrol | 3 | 2 | 0 | 1 | 5 | 3 | +2 | 4 | Advance to second round |
| 3 | Apolonia | 3 | 1 | 0 | 2 | 7 | 6 | +1 | 2 | |
| 4 | Puka | 3 | 0 | 0 | 3 | 2 | 12 | −10 | 0 | |

Source: Calciomondialeweb.it
Rules for classification: 1) points; 2) goal difference; 3) number of goals scored.

=== Group 3 ===
| Pos | Team | Pld | W | D | L | GF | GA | GD | Pts | Qualification |
|---|---|---|---|---|---|---|---|---|---|---|
| 1 | Elbasani | 3 | 2 | 0 | 1 | 5 | 2 | +3 | 4 | Advance to second round |
| 2 | Teuta | 3 | 2 | 0 | 1 | 4 | 3 | +1 | 4 | Advance to second round |
| 3 | Burreli | 3 | 1 | 0 | 2 | 2 | 4 | −2 | 2 | |
| 4 | Kukësi | 3 | 1 | 0 | 2 | 2 | 4 | −2 | 2 | |

Source: Calciomondialeweb.it
Rules for classification: 1) points; 2) goal difference; 3) number of goals scored.

=== Group 4 ===
| Pos | Team | Pld | W | D | L | GF | GA | GD | Pts | Qualification |
|---|---|---|---|---|---|---|---|---|---|---|
| 1 | Besa | 3 | 2 | 1 | 0 | 6 | 1 | +5 | 5 | Advance to second round |
| 2 | Laçi | 3 | 2 | 0 | 1 | 7 | 7 | 0 | 4 | Advance to second round |
| 3 | Besëlidhja | 3 | 1 | 0 | 2 | 5 | 5 | 0 | 2 | |
| 4 | Rrësheni | 3 | 0 | 1 | 2 | 2 | 7 | −5 | 1 | |

Source: Calciomondialeweb.it
Rules for classification: 1) points; 2) goal difference; 3) number of goals scored.

=== Group 5 ===
| Pos | Team | Pld | W | D | L | GF | GA | GD | Pts | Qualification |
|---|---|---|---|---|---|---|---|---|---|---|
| 1 | Dinamo Tirana | 3 | 3 | 0 | 0 | 8 | 1 | +7 | 6 | Advance to second round |
| 2 | Pogradeci | 3 | 2 | 0 | 1 | 10 | 2 | +8 | 4 | Advance to second round |
| 3 | Korabi | 3 | 1 | 0 | 2 | 2 | 4 | −2 | 2 | |
| 4 | Gramozi | 3 | 0 | 0 | 3 | 1 | 14 | −13 | 0 | |

Source: Calciomondialeweb.it
Rules for classification: 1) points; 2) goal difference; 3) number of goals scored.

=== Group 6 ===
| Pos | Team | Pld | W | D | L | GF | GA | GD | Pts | Qualification |
|---|---|---|---|---|---|---|---|---|---|---|
| 1 | Kastrioti | 3 | 2 | 0 | 1 | 8 | 4 | +4 | 4 | Advance to second round |
| 2 | Bylis | 3 | 2 | 0 | 1 | 10 | 7 | +3 | 4 | Advance to second round |
| 3 | Flamurtari | 3 | 2 | 0 | 1 | 7 | 5 | +2 | 4 | Advance to second round |
| 4 | Përmeti | 3 | 0 | 0 | 3 | 1 | 10 | −9 | 0 | |

Source: Calciomondialeweb.it
Rules for classification: 1) points; 2) goal difference; 3) number of goals scored.

=== Group 7 ===
| Pos | Team | Pld | W | D | L | GF | GA | GD | Pts | Qualification |
|---|---|---|---|---|---|---|---|---|---|---|
| 1 | Lushnja | 3 | 2 | 0 | 1 | 4 | 2 | +2 | 4 | Advance to second round |
| 2 | Selenica | 2 | 1 | 0 | 1 | 2 | 2 | 0 | 2 | |
| 3 | Tepelena | 3 | 1 | 0 | 2 | 2 | 4 | −2 | 2 | |
| 4 | Shqiponja | 2 | 1 | 0 | 1 | 2 | 2 | 0 | 2 | |

Source: Calciomondialeweb.it
Rules for classification: 1) points; 2) goal difference; 3) number of goals scored.

=== Group 8 ===
| Pos | Team | Pld | W | D | L | GF | GA | GD | Pts | Qualification |
|---|---|---|---|---|---|---|---|---|---|---|
| 1 | Tirana | 3 | 2 | 0 | 1 | 11 | 2 | +9 | 4 | Advance to second round |
| 2 | Skënderbeu | 3 | 2 | 0 | 1 | 4 | 2 | +2 | 4 | |
| 3 | Skrapari | 3 | 1 | 0 | 2 | 2 | 4 | −2 | 2 | |
| 4 | Butrinti | 3 | 1 | 0 | 2 | 2 | 11 | −9 | 2 | |

Source: Calciomondialeweb.it
Rules for classification: 1) points; 2) goal difference; 3) number of goals scored.

== Second round ==
All sixteen teams of the 1991–92 Superliga and First Division entered in this round. First and second legs were played in January 1993.

| Team 1 | Agg. | Team 2 | 1st leg | 2nd leg |
|---|---|---|---|---|
| Laçi | 2–4 | Vllaznia | 1–1 | 1–3 |
| Bylis | 0–1 | Partizani | 0–0 | 0–1 |
| Lushnja | 2–3 | Albpetrol | 0–0 | 2–3 |
| Flamurtari | 1–3 | Elbasani | 1–1 | 0–2 |
| Pogradeci | 3–2 | Kastrioti | 2–0 | 1–2 |
| Tomori | 1–4 | Dinamo Tirana | 1–1 | 0–3 |
| Besa | 0–1 | Sopoti | 0–0 | 0–1 |
| Teuta | 5–3 | Tirana | 3–1 | 2–2 |

== Quarter-finals ==
In this round entered the 8 winners from the previous round.

| Team 1 | Agg. | Team 2 | 1st leg | 2nd leg |
|---|---|---|---|---|
| Sopoti | 1–2 | Vllaznia | 1–0 | 0–2 |
| Elbasani | 4–5 | Albpetrol | 3–1 | 1–4 |
| Partizani | 3–3 (5–3 p) | Dinamo Tirana | 1–2 | 2–1 |
| Pogradeci | 2–2 (3–2 p) | Teuta | 2–0 | 0–2 |

== Semi-finals ==
In this round entered the four winners from the previous round.

| Team 1 | Agg. | Team 2 | 1st leg | 2nd leg |
|---|---|---|---|---|
| Pogradeci | 0–1 | Partizani | 0–0 | 0–1 |
| Vllaznia | 1–3 | Albpetrol | 1–0 | 0–3 |

== Final ==
19 May 1993
16:00

| Partizani | 1–0 | Albpetrol |
|---|---|---|
| Myftari 26' (pen.) |

Niko Dovana Stadium, Durrës
Attendance: 2,000
Referee: Allaj
