= 1963–64 Albanian Cup =

Kupa e Shqipërisë

Tournament details
- Country: Albania

Final positions
- Champions: Partizani
- Runners-up: Tomori

1963–64 Albanian Cup (Albanian: Kupa e Shqipërisë) was the 14th season of Albania's annual cup competition. It began in August 1963 with the First Round and ended in May 1964 with the Final match. 17 Nëntori were the defending champions, having won their second Albanian Cup last season, but failed to defend the title. The cup was won by Partizani.

The rounds were played in a one-legged format similar to those of European competitions. If the number of goals was equal, the match was decided by extra time and a penalty shoot-out, if necessary.

== First round ==
The games were played in August 1963*

- Results unknown

== Second round ==
In this round entered the 16 winners from the previous round. The games were played in January 1964.

Team 1	Score	Team 2
Traktori	0–3	Besa
Dinamo Tirana	1–0	Skënderbeu
Fitorja	2–1	Korabi
Punëtori	0–9	Partizani
Vllaznia	2–3	Labinoti
Erzeni	0–3	Tomori
Lokomotiva Durrës	2–1	17 Nëntori
Ylli i Kuq	2–3	Flamurtari

== Quarter-finals ==
In this round entered the 8 winners from the previous round.

Team 1	Score	Team 2
Besa	0–1	Dinamo Tirana
Flamurtari	2–0	Lokomotiva Durrës
Tomori	2–0	Labinoti
Partizani	6–0	Fitorja

== Semi-finals ==
In this round entered the four winners from the previous round.

Team 1	Score	Team 2
KF Partizani	2–1	Dinamo Tirana
Tomori	2–1	Flamurtari

== Final ==
22 March 1964

Partizani	3–0	Tomori
Jashari 10'; Shehu 72', 77'

Qemal Stafa Stadium, Tirana
Attendance: 11,000
Referee: H. Turdiu
