= 1969–70 Albanian Cup =

Kupa e Shqipërisë

Tournament details
- Country: Albania

Final positions
- Champions: Partizani
- Runners-up: Vllaznia

1969–70 Albanian Cup (Albanian: Kupa e Shqipërisë) was the eighteenth season of Albania's annual cup competition. It began in August 1969 with the First Round and ended in May 1970 with the Final matches. Partizani were the defending champions, having won their eighth Albanian Cup last season. The cup was won by Partizani.

The rounds were played in a two-legged format similar to those of European competitions. If the aggregated score was tied after both games, the team with the higher number of away goals advanced. If the number of away goals was equal in both games, the match was decided by extra time and a penalty shootout, if necessary.

== First round ==
Games were played in August 1969*

- Results unknown

== Second round ==
In this round entered the 16 winners from the previous round. First and second legs were played in January 1970.

Team 1	Agg.	Team 2	1st leg	2nd leg
Dinamo Tirana	3–2	Besa	1–2	2–0
Partizani	3–2	Labinoti	2–1	1-1
Traktori	3–2	Flamurtari	1–0	2–2
Lokomotiva Durrës	0–7	Vllaznia	0–4	0–3
Apolonia	1–0	Tekstilisti	0–0	1–0
Naftëtari	1–0	Skënderbeu	0–0	1–0
Punëtori	1–7	17 Nëntori	0–2	1–5
Korabi	0–5	Luftëtari	0–1	0–4

== Quarter-finals ==
In this round entered the 8 winners from the previous round.

Team 1	Agg.	Team 2	1st leg	2nd leg
Luftëtari	1–7	Partizani	0–3	1–4
Traktori	1–8	17 Nëntori	0–3	1–5
Dinamo Tirana	1–3	Vllaznia	1–0	0–3
Apolonia	2–1	Naftëtari	1–1	1–0

== Semi-finals ==
In this round entered the four winners from the previous round.

Team 1	Agg.	Team 2	1st leg	2nd leg
17 Nëntori	1–3	Partizani	0–3	1–0
Vllaznia	8–2	Apolonia	7–1	1–1

== Finals ==
In this round entered the two winners from the previous round.

Team 1	Agg.	Team 2	1st leg	2nd leg
Partizani	4–1	Vllaznia	4–0	0–1

=== First leg ===
8 March 1970

Partizani	4–0	Vllaznia
Bizi 30'; Janku 51', 55'; Shllaku 86'

Qemal Stafa Stadium, Tirana
Attendance: 18,000
Referee: F. Bajrami

=== Second leg ===
15 March 1970

Vllaznia	1–0	Partizani
Hoxha 16'

Vojo Kushi Stadium, Shkodër
Attendance: 13,000
Referee: R. Kuka
