= 1957 Albanian Cup =

Kupa e Shqipërisë

Tournament details
- Country: Albania

Final positions
- Champions: Partizani
- Runners-up: Puna Durrës

1957 Albanian Cup (Albanian: Kupa e Shqipërisë) was the ninth season of Albania's annual cup competition. It began in Spring 1957 with the First Round and ended in May 1957 with the Final match. Dinamo Tirana were the defending champions, having won their fifth Albanian Cup last season. The cup was won by Partizani.

The rounds were played in a one-legged format similar to those of European competitions. If the number of goals was equal, the match was decided by extra time and a penalty shootout, if necessary.

== First round ==
Games were played in March, 1957*

- Results unknown

== Second round ==
In this round entered the 16 winners from the previous round. First and second legs were played in March, 1957.

Team 1	Score	Team 2
Puna Elbasan	1–0	Puna Peshkopi
Puna Qyteti Stalin	1–4	Partizani
Puna Berat	1–2	Dinamo Tirana
Puna Shkodër	2–0	Puna Lushnjë
Puna Fier	0–3	Spartak Tirana
Puna Tirana	1–2	Puna Kavajë
Puna Gjirokastër	0–2	Puna Vlorë
Puna Korçë	1–2	Puna Durrës

== Quarter-finals ==
In this round entered the 8 winners from the previous round.

Team 1	Score	Team 2
Puna Elbasan	0–3	Partizani
Puna Shkodër^{+}	0–0	Dinamo Tirana
Puna Durrës	4–0	Puna Vlorë
Puna Kavajë	2–0	Spartak Tirana

^{+} Puna Shkodër won by corners.

== Semi-finals ==
In this round entered the four winners from the previous round.

Team 1	Score	Team 2
Puna Shkodër	0–1	Partizani
Puna Durrës	1–0	Puna Kavajë

== Final ==
3 November 1957

Partizani	2–0	Puna Durrës
Resmja 87', 90'

Qemal Stafa Stadium, Tirana
Referee: R. Kuka
