= 1948 Albanian Cup =

Kupa e Shqipërisë

Tournament details
- Country: Albania

Final positions
- Champions: Partizani
- Runners-up: 17 Nëntori

1948 Albanian Cup (Albanian: Kupa e Shqipërisë) was the second season of Albania's annual cup competition. It began in Spring 1948 with the First Round and ended in May 1948 with the Final match. Tirana were the defending champions, having won their first Albanian Cup last season. The cup was won by Partizani.

The rounds were played in a one-legged format. If the number of goals was equal, the match was decided by extra time and a penalty shootout, if necessary.

== First round ==
Games were played in March, 1948*

Team 1	Score	Team 2
Peshkopia	2–0	??
Tomori	?–?	Traktori

== Second round ==
Games were played in March, 1948*

- Team 1	Agg.	Team 2	1st leg	2nd leg
  Peshkopia	6–3	Kopliku	4–1	2–2
  Tomori	?–?	Patosi	?–?	?–?

== Third round ==
Games were played in March, 1948*

- Team 1	Agg.	Team 2	1st leg	2nd leg
  Bardhyli	?–?	Peshkopia	?–?	?–?
  17 Nëntori	?–?	Tomori	2–0	?–?

== Quarter-finals ==
In this round entered the 8 winners from the previous round*

- Team 1	Agg.	Team 2	1st leg	2nd leg	Play-off
  Partizani	4–1	Vllaznia	1–0	3–1	
  17 Nëntori	?–?	Apolonia	?–?	?–?	
  Ylli i Kuq	?–?	?	?–?	?–?	
  8 Nëntori	2–0	Bashkimi Elbasanas	0–0	0–0	2–0 (a.e.t.)^{+}
^{+} Played in Tirana.

== Semi-finals ==
In this round entered the four winners from the previous round*

- Team 1	Agg.	Team 2	1st leg	2nd leg
  Partizani	5–0	8 Nëntori	3–0	2–0
  17 Nëntori	?–?	Ylli i Kuq	?–?	?–?

== Final ==
28 February 1949

Partizani	5–2	17 Nëntori

Qemal Stafa Stadium, Tirana
Attendance: 20,000
Referee: Ramazan Kuka
