= 1958 Albanian Cup =

Kupa e Shqipërisë

Tournament details
- Country: Albania

Final positions
- Champions: Partizani
- Runners-up: Skënderbeu

1958 Albanian Cup (Albanian: Kupa e Shqipërisë) was the tenth season of Albania's annual cup competition. It began in Spring 1958 with the First Round and ended in May 1958 with the Final match. Partizani were the defending champions, having won their third Albanian Cup last season. The cup was won by Partizani.

The rounds were played in a one-legged format similar to those of European competitions. If the number of goals was equal, the match was decided by extra time and a penalty shootout, if necessary.

== First round ==
Games were played in March, 1958*

- Results unknown

== Second round ==
In this round entered the 16 winners from the previous round. First and second legs were played in March, 1958.

| Team 1 | Score | Team 2 |
|---|---|---|
| Korabi | 2–7 | Partizani |
| Naftëtari | 2–7 | Dinamo Tirana |
| Traktori | 0–3 | Labinoti |
| Tomori | 0–2 | 17 Nëntori |
| Dajti | 1–2 | Fitorja |
| Besa | 3–0 | Flamurtari |
| Lokomotiva Durrës | 2–1 | Erzeni |
| Skënderbeu | 4–2 | Luftëtari |

== Quarter-finals ==
In this round entered the 8 winners from the previous round.

| Team 1 | Score | Team 2 |
|---|---|---|
| Lokomotiva Durrës | 0–1 | Besa |
| Partizani | 11–0 | Fitorja |
| 17 Nëntori^{+} | 0–0 | Dinamo Tirana |
| Labinoti | 0–3 | Skënderbeu |

^{+} 17 Nëntori won by corners.

== Semi-finals ==
In this round entered the four winners from the previous round.

| Team 1 | Score | Team 2 |
|---|---|---|
| Partizani | 2–0 | Besa |
| Skënderbeu | 1–0 | 17 Nëntori |

== Final ==
2 November 1958

| Partizani | 4–0 | Skënderbeu |
|---|---|---|
| Resmja 33'; Kraja 39'; Bespalla 41'; Jashari 85' |

Qemal Stafa Stadium, Tirana
Attendance: 10,000
Referee: B. Hamdiu
