= 1949 Albanian Cup =

Kupa e Shqipërisë

Tournament details
- Country: Albania

Final positions
- Champions: Partizani
- Runners-up: Tirana

1949 Albanian Cup (Albanian: Kupa e Shqipërisë) was the third season of Albania's annual cup competition. It began in March 1949 with the First Round and ended in May 1949 with the Final match. Partizani were the defending champions, having won their first Albanian Cup last season. The 1949 cup was won by KF Partizani.

The rounds were played in a one-legged format. If the number of goals was equal, the match was decided by extra time and a penalty shootout, if necessary.

== First round ==
Games were played in March 1949*

- Results unknown.

== Second round ==
Games were played in March 1949*

- Results unknown.

== Quarter-finals ==
In this round entered the eight winners from the previous round.

Team 1	Score	Team 2
Shkozeti	0–4	Vlora
Partizani	2–1	Shkodra
Ylli i Kuq Durrës	6–0	Lezha
Tirana	5–1	Berati

== Semi-finals ==
In this round entered the four winners from the previous round*

Team 1	Score	Team 2
Ylli i Kuq Durrës	0–3	Tirana
Vlora	0–3	Partizani

- Results unknown.

== Final ==
8 January 1950

Partizani	1–0	Tirana

Qemal Stafa Stadium, Tirana
Attendance: 5,000
Referee: Nani Sallata
