= 1972–73 Albanian Cup =

Kupa e Shqipërisë

Tournament details
- Country: Albania

Final positions
- Champions: Partizani
- Runners-up: Dinamo Tirana

1972–73 Albanian Cup (Albanian: Kupa e Shqipërisë) was the twenty-first season of Albania's annual cup competition. It began in August 1972 with the First Round and ended in May 1973 with the Final match. The winners of the competition qualified for the 1973-74 first round of the UEFA Cup. Vllaznia were the defending champions, having won their second Albanian Cup last season. The cup was won by Partizani.

The rounds were played in a two-legged format similar to those of European competitions. If the aggregated score was tied after both games, the team with the higher number of away goals advanced. If the number of away goals was equal in both games, the match was decided by extra time and a penalty shootout, if necessary.

== First round ==
Games were played on August & September 1972*

- Results unknown

== Second round ==
In this round entered the 16 winners from the previous round. First and second legs were played in January 1973.

Team 1	Agg.	Team 2	1st leg	2nd leg
Dinamo Tirana	3–1	Besa	2–0	1–1
Vllaznia	3–1	17 Nëntori	2–1	1–0
Flamurtari	1–3	Partizani	1–1	0–2
Besëlidhja	2–3	Shkëndija Tirana	2–0	0–3
Skënderbeu	3–0	Studenti	2–0	1–0
Apolonia	3–2	Tomori	1–0	2–2
Traktori	3–1	Luftëtari	2–0	1–1
Lokomotiva Durrës	1–2	Labinoti	0–0	1–2

== Quarter-finals ==
In this round entered the 8 winners from the previous round.

Team 1	Agg.	Team 2	1st leg	2nd leg
Skënderbeu	0–3	Partizani	0–1	0–2
Vllaznia	2–3	Labinoti	2–0	0–3
Apolonia	0–2	Shkëndija Tirana	0–0	0–2
Dinamo Tirana	1–0	Traktori	0–0	1–0

== Semi-finals ==
In this round entered the four winners from the previous round.

Team 1	Agg.	Team 2	1st leg	2nd leg
Dinamo Tirana	3–1	Shkëndija Tirana	1–1	2–0
Partizani	3–1	Labinoti	1–0	2–1

== Final ==
9 June 1973

Partizani	1–0	Dinamo Tirana
Shehu 73'

Qemal Stafa Stadium, Tirana
Attendance: 16,000
Referee: S. Caslli
