= Ilir Përnaska =

Albanian footballer

Personal information
- Full name: Ilir Jonuz Përnaska
- Date of birth: 7 May 1951 (age 75)
- Place of birth: Tirana, Albania
- Height: 1.73 m (5 ft 8 in)
- Position: Striker

Senior career*
Years	Team	Apps	(Gls)
1967–1981	Dinamo Tirana		(136)

International career
1971–1981	Albania	15	(5)
- * Club domestic league appearances and goals

Ilir Jonuz Përnaska (born 7 May 1951) is an Albanian former footballer who played as a striker for Dinamo Tirana between 1967 and 1981, as well as the Albania national team. He is one of Dinamo's most famous players who is known for being one of the most prolific goalscorers in Albanian history, topping the domestic league's goalscoring charts for six successive seasons.

== Club career ==
Përnaska is a product of the famous Dinamo academy and in 1967 Skënder Jareci promoted him along with Faruk Sejdini to the Dinamo first team, where at the age of just 16 he was in the usual starting eleven. On his debut in 1967 in an away match against Traktori Lushnja, Përnaska helped his side to a 3–1 win, scoring 2 goals at the age of 16 on his professional debut.

Ilir was part of the 'Golden Age' of Dinamo between 1971 and 1981, where under the guidance of Skënder Jareci the club dominated Albanian football, winning 5 Albanian Superliga titles and 3 Albanian Cups. Përnaska formed a successful offensive partnership with Vasillaq Zëri and Shyqyri Ballgjini which is considered to be the best offensive trio in Dinamo's history. He was crowned top scorer in the league for 6 consecutive seasons between 1971 and 1977, becoming the second most frequent winner of the Albanian Golden Boot, behind Partizani Tirana's Refik Resmja, although Përnaska is the player who has been top goalscorer more than any other player in history as Resmja was only joint top scorer in 1955 and 1959.

Ilir retired from professional football in 1981 at the age of 30 after 14 years at Dinamo where he scored 136 goals and left his mark in the history of the club as well as Albanian football. Following his retirement he received a letter from Albania's Stalinist dictator Enver Hoxha along with a pair of shorts, which the player himself found to be a humourus act on the state's behalf.

== International career ==
He made his debut for Albania in a May 1971 Olympic Games qualification match against Romania in Tirana and earned a total of 15 caps, scoring 5 goals. His final international was a September 1981 FIFA World Cup qualification match against Finland.

=== International goals ===
Scores and results list Albania's goal tally first.

#	Date	Venue	Opponent	Score	Result	Competition
1	14 November 1971	Qemal Stafa Stadium, Tirana, Albania	Turkey	1–0	3–0	UEFA Euro 1972 qualifying
2	14 November 1971	Qemal Stafa Stadium, Tirana, Albania	Turkey	3–0	3–0	UEFA Euro 1972 qualifying
3	3 November 1976	Qemal Stafa Stadium, Tirana, Albania	Algeria	2–0	3–0	Friendly
4	3 November 1976	Qemal Stafa Stadium, Tirana, Albania	Algeria	3–0	3–0	Friendly
5	19 October 1980	Vasil Levski National Stadium, Sofia, Bulgaria	Bulgaria	2–1	2–1	1982 FIFA World Cup qualifying

== Honours ==
Dinamo Tirana

- Albanian Superliga (5): 1972–73, 1974–75, 1975–76, 1976–77, 1979–80
- Albanian Cup: 1970–71, 1973–74, 1977–78
- Spartakiada Kombëtare: 1959, 1969, 1974
- Kupa e Ushtrisë Popullore: 1973, 1978
- Kupa e 500 vjetorit të Skënderbeut: 1968

Individual

- Albanian Golden Boot (6): 1971–72, 1972–73, 1973–74, 1974–75, 1975–76, 1976–77
- Mjeshtër Sporti
- Mjeshtër i Merituar i Sportit
- Mjeshtër i Madh
- Order of Naim Frashëri

== Personal life ==
Përnaska was born in Tirana, his father Jonuz Korça was from the southern city of Korçë and his mother from the Këllezi clan in Tiranë, the last name 'Përnaska' was given to him over time. He moved to Ascoli Piceno, Italy in 1992, where he resides with his wife and 2 daughters.
