= 1952 Albanian Cup =

Kupa e Shqipërisë

Tournament details
- Country: Albania

Final positions
- Champions: Dinamo Tirana
- Runners-up: KF Tirana

1952 Albanian Cup (Albanian: Kupa e Shqipërisë) was the sixth season of Albania's annual cup competition. It began in February 1952 with the First Eliminatory Round and ended in May 1952 with the Final match. Dinamo Tirana were the defending champions, having won their second Albanian Cup last season. The cup was won by Dinamo Tirana.

The rounds were played in a one-legged format. Group A played three eliminatory rounds and Groups B, C and D played directly in quarter finals. If the number of goals was equal, the match was decided by extra time and a penalty shootout, if necessary.

== First eliminatory round ==
Games were played in February 1952.

Group A:

Team 1	Score	Team 2
Tekstilisti Stalin	4–1	Puna Shijak
Puna Elbasan	2–1	Puna Kavajë
Luftëtari i Sh.B.O. "Enver Hoxha"	1–0	Puna Vlorë
Spartaku Pogradec	3–2	Puna Lushnjë
Puna Lezhë	1–2	Puna Gjirokastër
Dinamo Berat	0–5	Spartaku Shkodër
Puna Berat	0–1	Puna Durrës
Spartaku Korçë	1–2	Puna Fier

== Second eliminatory round ==
Games were played in February 1952.

Group A:

Team 1	Score	Team 2
Puna Elbasan^{+}	0–0	Tekstilisti Stalin
Spartaku Pogradec	0–2	Luftëtari i Sh.B.O. "Enver Hoxha"
Puna Fier	1–0	Puna Gjirokastër
Puna Durrës	2–3	Spartaku Shkodër

^{+} Puna Elbasan won by corners.

== Third eliminatory round ==
Games were played in March 1952.

Group A:

Team 1	Score	Team 2
Luftëtari i Sh.B.O. "Enver Hoxha"	3–0	Puna Elbasan
Spartaku Shkodër	7–0	Puna Fier

== Quarterfinals ==
Games were played in March 1952.

Group A:

Team 1	Score	Team 2
Spartaku Shkodër	2–3	Luftëtari i Sh.B.O. "Enver Hoxha"

Group B:

Team 1	Score	Team 2
Dinamo Tirana	0–0 (3–2 p)	Partizani

Group C:

Team 1	Score	Team 2
Puna Tirana	4–0	Dinamo Vlorë

Group D:

Team 1	Score	Team 2
Puna Korçë	0–2	Puna Shkodër

== Semi-finals ==
In this round entered the four winners from the previous round.

Team 1	Score	Team 2
Puna Shkodër	1–4	Puna Tirana
Dinamo Tirana	2–0	Luftëtari i Sh.B.O. "Enver Hoxha"

== Final ==
19 October 1952

Dinamo Tirana	4–1	Puna Tirana
Jareci 18'; Gjinali 24'; Shaqiri 81'; Bakalli 89'		Mirashi 53'

Qemal Stafa Stadium, Tirana
Attendance: 16,000
Referee: N. Pilku
