= 1964–65 Albanian Cup =

Kupa e Shqipërisë

Tournament details
- Country: Albania

Final positions
- Champions: Vllaznia
- Runners-up: Skënderbeu

1964–65 Albanian Cup (Albanian: Kupa e Shqipërisë) was the fifteenth season of Albania's annual cup competition. It began in August 1964 with the First Round and ended in May 1965 with the Final match. Partizani were the defending champions, having won their sixth Albanian Cup last season. The cup was won by Vllaznia.

The rounds were played in a one-legged format similar to those of European competitions. If the number of goals was equal, the match was decided by extra time and a penalty shootout, if necessary.

== First round ==
Games were played in August 1964*

- Results unknown

== Second round ==
In this round entered the 16 winners from the previous round. First and second legs were played in January 1965.

Team 1	Score	Team 2
Partizani	1–1 (0–1 p)	Flamurtari
Labinoti	4–2	17 Nëntori
Besa	3–1	Erzeni
Luftëtari	2–1	Traktori
Tomori	1–1 (p)	Skënderbeu
Ylli i Kuq	4–2	Lokomotiva Durrës
Punëtori	2–0	Shkumbini
Korabi	0–3	Vllaznia

== Quarter-finals ==
In this round entered the 8 winners from the previous round.

Team 1	Score	Team 2
Besa	3–0	Ylli i Kuq
Skënderbeu	2–1	Punëtori
Vllaznia	1–1 (p)	Luftëtari
Flamurtari	2–1	Labinoti

== Semi-finals ==
In this round entered the four winners from the previous round.

Team 1	Score	Team 2
Skënderbeu	1–0	Besa
Vllaznia	2–1	Flamurtari

== Final ==
11 July 1965

Vllaznia	1–0	Skënderbeu
Dani 57'

Qemal Stafa Stadium, Tirana
Attendance: 8,000
Referee: R. Pregja
