= Luftëtari i Sh.B.O. "Enver Hoxha" =

- Full name: Luftëtari i Shkollës së Bashkuar të Oficerëve "Enver Hoxha"
- Founded: 1951; 74 years ago
- Dissolved: 1956
- Ground: Qemal Stafa Stadium
- Capacity: 19,700
- 1955: Kategoria Superiore, 8th (disbanded)

Luftëtari i Shkollës së Bashkuar të Oficerëve "Enver Hoxha" is a former Albanian professional football club which competed in the Albanian National Championship between 1952 and 1955. The club reached the semi-finals of the Albanian Cup in 1952 and 1954. In their final league appearance of 1955, they finished in 8th place out of 16 teams.
