= 1961 Albanian Cup =

Kupa e Shqipërisë

Tournament details
- Country: Albania

Final positions
- Champions: Partizani
- Runners-up: Besa

1961 Albanian Cup (Albanian: Kupa e Shqipërisë) was the twelfth season of Albania's annual cup competition. It began in Spring 1961 with the First Round and ended in May 1961 with the Final matches. Dinamo Tirana were the defending champions, having won their sixth Albanian Cup last season.

The cup was won by Partizani.

The rounds were played in a two-legged format similar to those of European competitions. If the aggregated score was tied after both games, the team with the higher number of away goals advanced. If the number of away goals was equal in both games, the match was decided by extra time and a penalty shootout, if necessary.

== First round ==
Games were played in March 1961*

- Results unknown

== Second round ==
All sixteen teams of the 1960 Superliga and First Division entered in this round. First and second legs were played in March 1961.

Team 1	Agg.	Team 2	1st leg	2nd leg
17 Nëntori	12–2	Luftëtari	10–2	2–0
Traktori	2–7	Dinamo Tirana	2–5	0–2
Fitorja	3–6	Lokomotiva Durrës	1–1	2–5
Vllaznia	2–3	Besa	2–2	0–1
Tomori	1–3	Ylli i Kuq	1–2	0–1
Labinoti^{+}	3–3	Skënderbeu	1–2	2–1
Partizani	14–2	Tërbuni	10–1	4–1
Apolonia	0–1	Flamurtari	0–0	0–1

^{+} Labinoti won by corners.

== Quarter-finals ==
In this round entered the 8 winners from the previous round.

Team 1	Agg.	Team 2	1st leg	2nd leg
Partizani	7–0	Ylli i Kuq	5–0	2–0(awd)
Labinoti	3–5	Dinamo Tirana	3–2	0–3
Besa	6–3	Lokomotiva Durrës	4–2	2–1
17 Nëntori	3–0	Flamurtari	2–0	1–0

== Semi-finals ==
In this round entered the four winners from the previous round.

Team 1	Agg.	Team 2	1st leg	2nd leg
Besa	3–2	17 Nëntori	1–1	2–1
Partizani	3–1	Dinamo Tirana	2–1	1–0

== Finals ==
In this round entered the two winners from the previous round.

Team 1	Agg.	Team 2	1st leg	2nd leg
Besa	1–2	Partizani	0–1	1–1

=== First leg ===
23 November 1961

Besa	0–1	Partizani
		Kraja 50'

Besa Stadium, Kavajë
Referee: S. Kotherja

=== Second leg ===
29 November 1961

Partizani	1–1	Besa
Pano 24'		Saraçi 60'

Qemal Stafa Stadium, Tirana
