= 1960 Albanian Cup =

Kupa e Shqipërisë

Tournament details
- Country: Albania

Final positions
- Champions: Dinamo Tirana
- Runners-up: Flamurtari

1960 Albanian Cup (Albanian: Kupa e Shqipërisë) was the eleventh season of Albania's annual cup competition. It began in Spring 1960 with the First Round and ended in May 1960 with the Final matches. Partizani were the defending champions, having won their fourth Albanian Cup last season.

The cup was won by Dinamo Tirana.

The rounds were played in a two-legged format similar to those of European competitions. If the aggregate score was tied after both games, the team with the higher number of away goals advanced. If the number of away goals was equal in both games, the match was decided by extra time and a penalty shootout, if necessary.

== First round ==
Games were played in March, 1960*

- Results unknown.

== Second round ==
All sixteen teams of the 1958 Superliga and First Division entered in this round. First and second legs were played in March, 1960.

Team 1	Agg.	Team 2	1st leg	2nd leg
Korabi	0–14	Dinamo Tirana	0–4	0–10
Fitorja	1–6	17 Nëntori	0–1	1–5
Lokomotiva Durrës	1–9	Partizani	1–7	0–2
Tomori	2–5	Labinoti	1–1	1–4
Luftëtari	2–5	Vllaznia	2–3	0–2
Skënderbeu	6–1	Tërbuni	2–1	4–0
Erzeni	3–7	Besa	1–1	2–6
Flamurtari	3–0	Ylli i Kuq	2–0	1–0

== Quarter-finals ==
In this round entered the 8 winners from the previous round.

Team 1	Agg.	Team 2	1st leg	2nd leg
Vllaznia	1–5	Skënderbeu	1–1	0–4
Partizani	7–0	Labinoti	2–0	5–0
Besa	1–1	Flamurtari^{+}	0–0	1–1
Dinamo Tirana	4–2	17 Nëntori	2–1	2–1

^{+} Flamurtari won by corners.

== Semi-finals ==
In this round entered the four winners from the previous round.

Team 1	Agg.	Team 2	1st leg	2nd leg
Flamurtari	5–4	Skënderbeu	1–1	4–3
Partizani	3–4	Dinamo Tirana	2–2	1–2

== Finals ==
In this round entered the two winners from the previous round.

Team 1	Agg.	Team 2	1st leg	2nd leg
Flamurtari	0–2	Dinamo Tirana	0–1	0–1

=== First leg ===
16 November 1960

Flamurtari	0–1	Dinamo Tirana
		Jareci

Varri i Halimit, Vlorë
Referee: B. Hamdiu

=== Second leg ===
20 November 1960

Dinamo Tirana	1–0	Flamurtari
Lubonja 88'

Selman Stërmasi Stadium, Tirana
Referee: R. Kuka
