= 1991–92 Albanian Cup =

Kupa e Shqipërisë

Tournament details
- Country: Albania

Final positions
- Champions: Elbasani
- Runners-up: Besa

1991–92 Albanian Cup (Albanian: Kupa e Shqipërisë) was the fortieth season of Albania's annual cup competition. It began in August 1991 with the First Round and ended in May 1992 with the Final match. The winners of the competition qualified for the 1992-93 first round of the UEFA Cup. Partizani were the defending champions, having won their twelfth Albanian Cup last season. The cup was won by Elbasani.

The first round was played in a single round-robin matches within 8 qualifying groups. The other rounds were played in a one-legged format similar to those of European competitions. If the number of goals was equal, the match was decided by extra time and a penalty shootout, if necessary.

== First round ==
Games were played on August & September 1991

=== Group 1 ===
| Pos | Team | Pld | W | D | L | GF | GA | GD | Pts | Qualification |
|---|---|---|---|---|---|---|---|---|---|---|
| 1 | Vllaznia | 5 | 4 | 0 | 1 | 9 | 1 | +8 | 8 | Advance to second round |
| 2 | Korabi | 4 | 3 | 0 | 1 | 6 | 3 | +3 | 6 | Advance to second round |
| 3 | Laçi | 4 | 2 | 1 | 1 | 8 | 4 | +4 | 5 | |
| 4 | Kukësi | 4 | 1 | 0 | 3 | 3 | 9 | −6 | 2 | |
| 5 | Valbona | 4 | 0 | 1 | 3 | 2 | 8 | −6 | 1 | |
| 6 | Kopliku | 1 | 0 | 0 | 1 | 0 | 3 | −3 | 0 | |

Source: Calciomondialeweb.it
Rules for classification: 1) points; 2) goal difference; 3) number of goals scored.

=== Group 2 ===
| Pos | Team | Pld | W | D | L | GF | GA | GD | Pts | Qualification |
|---|---|---|---|---|---|---|---|---|---|---|
| 1 | Kastrioti | 5 | 3 | 2 | 0 | 7 | 3 | +4 | 8 | Advance to second round |
| 2 | Partizani | 5 | 3 | 1 | 1 | 19 | 4 | +15 | 7 | Advance to second round |
| 3 | 31 Korriku | 4 | 2 | 1 | 1 | 10 | 4 | +6 | 5 | |
| 4 | Erzeni | 5 | 2 | 1 | 2 | 8 | 10 | −2 | 5 | |
| 5 | Sh.Bashkuar | 5 | 1 | 0 | 4 | 2 | 20 | −18 | 2 | |
| 6 | Puka | 4 | 0 | 1 | 3 | 6 | 11 | −5 | 1 | |

Source: Calciomondialeweb.it
Rules for classification: 1) points; 2) goal difference; 3) number of goals scored.

=== Group 3 ===
| Pos | Team | Pld | W | D | L | GF | GA | GD | Pts | Qualification |
|---|---|---|---|---|---|---|---|---|---|---|
| 1 | Besa | 5 | 3 | 2 | 0 | 13 | 3 | +10 | 8 | Advance to second round |
| 2 | Tirana | 5 | 4 | 0 | 1 | 12 | 5 | +7 | 8 | Advance to second round |
| 3 | Studenti | 5 | 2 | 2 | 1 | 5 | 4 | +1 | 6 | |
| 4 | Dajti | 5 | 2 | 1 | 2 | 7 | 6 | +1 | 5 | |
| 5 | Poliçani | 5 | 1 | 0 | 4 | 7 | 20 | −13 | 2 | |
| 6 | Memaliaj | 5 | 0 | 1 | 4 | 4 | 10 | −6 | 1 | |

Source: Calciomondialeweb.it
Rules for classification: 1) points; 2) goal difference; 3) number of goals scored.

=== Group 4 ===
| Pos | Team | Pld | W | D | L | GF | GA | GD | Pts | Qualification |
|---|---|---|---|---|---|---|---|---|---|---|
| 1 | Flamurtari | 5 | 4 | 1 | 0 | 19 | 3 | +16 | 9 | Advance to second round |
| 2 | Selenica | 5 | 4 | 0 | 1 | 15 | 5 | +10 | 8 | Advance to second round |
| 3 | Butrinti | 5 | 2 | 1 | 2 | 10 | 16 | −6 | 5 | |
| 4 | Luftëtari | 5 | 1 | 2 | 2 | 5 | 10 | −5 | 4 | |
| 5 | Tepelena | 4 | 0 | 2 | 2 | 2 | 9 | −7 | 2 | |
| 6 | Delvina | 4 | 0 | 0 | 4 | 3 | 11 | −8 | 0 | |

Source: Calciomondialeweb.it
Rules for classification: 1) points; 2) goal difference; 3) number of goals scored.

=== Group 5 ===
| Pos | Team | Pld | W | D | L | GF | GA | GD | Pts | Qualification |
|---|---|---|---|---|---|---|---|---|---|---|
| 1 | Punëtori | 5 | 4 | 0 | 1 | 10 | 5 | +5 | 8 | Advance to second round |
| 2 | Teuta | 5 | 3 | 1 | 1 | 18 | 3 | +15 | 7 | Advance to second round |
| 3 | Apolonia | 5 | 3 | 1 | 1 | 18 | 5 | +13 | 7 | |
| 4 | Ballshi | 5 | 2 | 1 | 2 | 11 | 4 | +7 | 5 | |
| 5 | Këlcyra | 5 | 1 | 0 | 4 | 2 | 21 | −19 | 2 | |
| 6 | Përmeti | 5 | 0 | 1 | 4 | 5 | 26 | −21 | 1 | |

Source: Calciomondialeweb.it
Rules for classification: 1) points; 2) goal difference; 3) number of goals scored.

=== Group 6 ===
| Pos | Team | Pld | W | D | L | GF | GA | GD | Pts | Qualification |
|---|---|---|---|---|---|---|---|---|---|---|
| 1 | Pogradeci | 4 | 3 | 0 | 1 | 11 | 4 | +7 | 6 | Advance to second round |
| 2 | Skënderbeu | 4 | 3 | 0 | 1 | 5 | 3 | +2 | 6 | Advance to second round |
| 3 | Sopoti | 4 | 1 | 2 | 1 | 6 | 5 | +1 | 4 | |
| 4 | Gramozi | 4 | 1 | 1 | 2 | 4 | 7 | −3 | 3 | |
| 5 | Gramshi | 4 | 0 | 1 | 3 | 2 | 9 | −7 | 1 | |
| – | Devolli | – | – | – | – | – | – | — | 0 | |

Source: Calciomondialeweb.it
Rules for classification: 1) points; 2) goal difference; 3) number of goals scored.

=== Group 7 ===
| Pos | Team | Pld | W | D | L | GF | GA | GD | Pts | Qualification |
|---|---|---|---|---|---|---|---|---|---|---|
| 1 | Naftëtari | 4 | 3 | 1 | 0 | 14 | 2 | +12 | 7 | Advance to second round |
| 2 | Tomori | 4 | 3 | 1 | 0 | 9 | 2 | +7 | 7 | Advance to second round |
| 3 | Shkumbini | 3 | 1 | 0 | 2 | 3 | 8 | −5 | 2 | |
| 4 | Domozdova | 3 | 1 | 0 | 2 | 1 | 10 | −9 | 2 | |
| 5 | Rrëshen | 4 | 0 | 0 | 4 | 2 | 7 | −5 | 0 | |
| – | Dinamo Tirana | – | – | – | – | – | – | — | 0 | |

Source: Calciomondialeweb.it
Rules for classification: 1) points; 2) goal difference; 3) number of goals scored.

=== Group 8 ===
| Pos | Team | Pld | W | D | L | GF | GA | GD | Pts | Qualification |
|---|---|---|---|---|---|---|---|---|---|---|
| 1 | Besëlidhja | 5 | 4 | 1 | 0 | 20 | 2 | +18 | 9 | Advance to second round |
| 2 | Labinoti | 5 | 3 | 2 | 0 | 12 | 3 | +9 | 8 | Advance to second round |
| 3 | Lushnja | 5 | 3 | 1 | 1 | 10 | 3 | +7 | 7 | |
| 4 | Cërriku | 5 | 1 | 1 | 3 | 4 | 12 | −8 | 3 | |
| 5 | Skrapari | 4 | 0 | 1 | 3 | 1 | 14 | −13 | 1 | |
| 6 | Rrogozhina | 4 | 0 | 0 | 4 | 3 | 16 | −13 | 0 | |

Source: Calciomondialeweb.it
Rules for classification: 1) points; 2) goal difference; 3) number of goals scored.

== Second round ==
All sixteen teams of the 1990–91 Superliga and First Division entered in this round. First and second legs were played in January 1992.

| Team 1 | Score | Team 2 |
|---|---|---|
| Flamurtari | 4–1 | Naftëtari |
| Labinoti | 1–1 (4–3 p) | Vllaznia |
| Besa | 6–0 | Korabi |
| Partizani | 1–1 (5–4 p) | Kastrioti |
| Selenica | 3–0 | Besëlidhja |
| Tirana | 3–2 | Pogradeci |
| Punëtori | 2–1 | Teuta |
| Tomori | 1–0 | Skënderbeu |

== Quarter-finals ==
In this round entered the 8 winners from the previous round.

| Team 1 | Score | Team 2 |
|---|---|---|
| Partizani | 3–0 | Tomori |
| Elbasani | 1–0 | Tirana |
| Flamurtari | 6–0 | Selenica |
| Besa | 4–1 | Punëtori |

== Semi-finals ==
In this round entered the four winners from the previous round.

| Team 1 | Score | Team 2 |
|---|---|---|
| Besa | 3–0 | Partizani |
| Elbasani | 5–0 | Flamurtari |

== Final ==
7 June 1992
16:30

| Elbasani | 2–1 | Besa |
|---|---|---|
| Peqini 45'; Tafani 79' | | Biturku 81' |

Qemal Stafa Stadium, Tirana
Attendance: 2,700
Referee: Besnik Kaimi
