= 1938–39 Albanian Cup =

Kupa e Shqipërisë

Tournament details
- Country: Albania

Final positions
- Champions: Tirana
- Runners-up: Vllaznia

1938–39 Albanian Cup, named King's Cup in honor of King Zog I of Albania, was the first season of Albania's annual cup competition. This competition consisted of a double round-robin system with a broad participation of three divisions and six groups. 3 teams took part in the main group (Group A) and played for Cup winner: Tirana, Vllaznia and Besa. The season started on December 11, 1938, and ended on January 22, 1939.

Tirana won the cup.

KS Besa surprised 5 times Albanian Champions, KF Tirana by winning the opening match in Kavajë 2–1, making a brilliant start. Tirana compensated somehow by breaking Vllaznia 5–3 in the next match. Besa just could not do the same to Vllaznia at their home stadium, by losing this time 1–2, this equalized all teams in points. Vllaznia then broke Besa once again in Shkodër whilst Tirana retaliated their only loss by beating Besa in Tirana 4-2 and therefore eliminating them directly. Tirana needed just one point in the final match in Shkodër against Vllaznia to secure their first major trophy, but hosts were left stunned when Tirana won 2–1 in Loro Borici Stadium and lifting therefore the first Albanian Cup despite being 0-1 down in scoreline. Below are the matches in the order they were played:

== Final stage results ==
=== Group A ===
Besa - Tirana	2-1
Tirana - Vllaznia	5-3
Besa - Vllaznia	1-2
Vllaznia - Besa	2-0
Tirana - Besa	4-2
Vllaznia - Tirana	1-2

=== Final table ===
Pos	Team	Pld	W	D	L	GF	GA	GD	Pts
1	Tirana (C)	4	3	0	1	12	8	+4	6
2	Vllaznia	4	2	0	2	8	8	0	4
3	Besa	4	1	0	3	5	9	−4	2

(C) Champions

== Other Groups ==
=== Group B ===
Pos	Team	Pld	W	D	L	GF	GA	GD	Pts
1	Skënderbeu	4	3	0	1	13	4	+9	6
2	Bashkimi Elbasanas	4	2	0	2	7	4	+3	4
3	Dragoj	4	1	0	3	3	12	−9	2

=== Group C ===
Pos	Team	Pld	W	D	L	GF	GA	GD	Pts
1	Durrësi	6	5	1	0	22	3	+19	11
2	Bardhyli	6	3	0	3	9	12	−3	6
3	Ismail Qemali	6	2	2	2	11	6	+5	6
4	Tomori	6	0	1	5	5	18	−13	1
