= 1977–78 Albanian Cup =

Kupa e Shqipërisë

Tournament details
- Country: Albania

Final positions
- Champions: Dinamo Tirana
- Runners-up: Traktori

1977–78 Albanian Cup (Albanian: Kupa e Shqipërisë) was the twenty-sixth season of Albania's annual cup competition. It began in August 1977 with the First Round and ended in May 1978, with the Final matches. The winners of the competition qualified for the 1978-79 First round of the UEFA Cup. 17 Nëntori were the defending champions, having won their fourth Albanian Cup last season. The cup was won by Dinamo Tirana.

The rounds were played in a two-legged format similar to those of European competitions. If the aggregated score was tied after both games, the team with the higher number of away goals advanced. If the number of away goals was equal in both games, the match was decided by extra time and a penalty shootout, if necessary.

== First round ==
Games were played on August & September 1977*

- Results unknown

== Second round ==
In this round entered the 16 winners from the previous round. First and second legs were played in January 1978.

Team 1	Agg.	Team 2	1st leg	2nd leg
Flamurtari	1–3	Vllaznia	1–1	0–2
Minatori Tepelena	2–3	Skënderbeu	2–1	0–2
Besëlidhja	2–2 (p)	Lokomotiva Durrës	1–0	1–2
Shkëndija Tiranë	2–3	Dinamo Tirana	0–2	2–1
Tomori	2–1	Luftëtari	1–0	1–1
Partizani	1–2	Naftëtari	1–1	0–1
Traktori	1–0	Labinoti	1–0	0–0
Besa	1–1 (p)	17 Nëntori	1–0	0–1

== Quarter-finals ==
In this round entered the 8 winners from the previous round.

Team 1	Agg.	Team 2	1st leg	2nd leg
Vllaznia	2–1	Skënderbeu	1–1	1–0
Besëlidhja	1–3	Dinamo Tirana	1–0	0–3
Tomori	4–1	Naftëtari	2–1	2–0
17 Nëntori	2–2 (p)	Traktori	0–1	2–1

== Semi-finals ==
In this round entered the four winners from the previous round.

Team 1	Agg.	Team 2	1st leg	2nd leg
Vllaznia	4–5	Dinamo Tirana	2–1	2–4
Tomori	2–3	Traktori	1–0	1–3

== Finals ==
In this round entered the two winners from the previous round.

Team 1	Agg.	Team 2	1st leg	2nd leg
Dinamo Tirana	1–0	Traktori	1–0	0–0

=== First leg ===
22 January 1978

Dinamo Tirana	1–0	Traktori
Ballgjini 53' (pen.)

Selman Stërmasi Stadium, Tirana
Referee: P. Doko

=== Second leg ===
29 January 1978

Traktori	0–0	Dinamo Tirana

Roza Haxhiu Stadium, Lushnjë
Referee: F. Pupa
