= Dhimitër Dimroçi =

Albanian footballer

Mit Dimroçi
Personal information
- Full name: Dhimitër Dimroçi
- Date of birth: 24 April 1935
- Place of birth: Kavajë, Albania
- Date of death: 7 August 2013 (aged 78)
- Position: Striker

Senior career*
Years	Team	Apps	(Gls)
1953–	Besa		
- Partizani
–1967	Luftëtari i Ushtrisë		
- * Club domestic league appearances and goals

Dhimitër "Mit" Dimroçi (24 April 1935 - 7 August 2013) was an Albanian footballer who played most of his professional career as a forward for Besa Kavajë.

== Club career ==
Dhimitër Dimroçi started his career with hometown club Besa in 1953 and went on to serve as team captain. Known for his powerful left foot, he led the team to a successful second-place finish during the 1958 season. Dimroçi played for two other teams, Partizani Tirana and Luftëtari i Ushtrisë, concluding his long career in 1967. Along with Qemal Gavardari and Hasan Gërmani, they formed an unforgettable attacking trio, famous in Albania during the 1950s and early 1960s.
