= 1982–83 Albanian Cup =

Kupa e Shqipërisë

Tournament details
- Country: Albania

Final positions
- Champions: 17 Nëntori
- Runners-up: Flamurtari

1982–83 Albanian Cup (Albanian: Kupa e Shqipërisë) was the thirty-first season of Albania's annual cup competition. It began in August 1982 with the First Round and ended in February 1983 with the Final match. The winners of the competition qualified for the 1983-84 first round of the UEFA Cup. Dinamo Tirana were the defending champions, having won their tenth Albanian Cup last season. The cup was won by 17 Nëntori.

The rounds were played in a two-legged format similar to those of European competitions. If the aggregated score was tied after both games, the team with the higher number of away goals advanced. If the number of away goals was equal in both games, the match was decided by extra time and a penalty shootout, if necessary.

== First round ==
Games were played on August & September 1982*

- Results unknown

== Second round ==
All sixteen teams of the 1981–82 Superliga and First Division entered in this round. First and second legs were played in January 1983.

Team 1	Agg.	Team 2	1st leg	2nd leg
31 Korriku	2–4	Vllaznia	1–1	1–3
Labinoti	0–1	Flamurtari	0–0	0–1
Besëlidhja	1–2	Lokomotiva Durrës	1–0	0–2
Naftëtari	4–5	Luftëtari	3–3	1–2
Erzeni	1–5	17 Nëntori	1–3	0–2
Dinamo Tirana	6–3	Tomori	5–2	1–1
Besa	3–6	Partizani	2–2	1–4
Traktori	1–2	Skënderbeu	1–1	0–1

== Quarter-finals ==
In this round entered the 8 winners from the previous round.

Team 1	Agg.	Team 2	1st leg	2nd leg
Flamurtari	2–2 (a)	Vllaznia	1–0	1–2
Luftëtari	0–4	Lokomotiva Durrës	0–1	0–3
Dinamo Tirana	2–3	17 Nëntori	0–0	2–3
Skënderbeu	0–3	Partizani	0–1	0–2

== Semi-finals ==
In this round entered the four winners from the previous round.

Team 1	Agg.	Team 2	1st leg	2nd leg
Flamurtari	3–2	Lokomotiva Durrës	1–0	2–2
Partizani	2–3	17 Nëntori	0–2	2–1

== Final ==
3 February 1983

17 Nëntori	1–0	Flamurtari
Mema 27'

Qemal Stafa Stadium, Tirana
Attendance: 12,000
Referee: Dhori Prifti
