= 1951 Albanian Cup =

Kupa e Shqipërisë

Tournament details
- Country: Albania

Final positions
- Champions: Dinamo Tirana
- Runners-up: KF Partizani

The 1951 Albanian Cup (Albanian: Kupa e Shqipërisë) was the fifth season of Albania's annual football cup competition. It began in Spring 1951 with the First Round and ended in May 1951 with the Final match. Dinamo Tirana were the defending champions, having won their first Albanian Cup the previous season. The cup was won by Dinamo Tirana.

The rounds were played in a one-legged format. If the number of goals was equal, the match was decided by extra time and a penalty shootout, if necessary.

== First round ==
Games were played in March 1951*

- Results unknown.

== Second round ==
Games were played in March 1951.

Team 1	Score	Team 2
Puna Fier	0–6	Partizani
Puna Gjirokastër	1–2	Puna Tirana
Spartaku Korçë	0–4	Puna Shkodër
Spartaku Shkodër	1–0	Puna Kavajë
Dinamo Tirana	6–0	Dinamo Vlorë
Puna Vlorë	1–0	Puna Korçë
Puna Qyteti Stalin	2–6	Puna Durrës
Puna Berat	2–0 (w/o)	Puna Elbasan

== Quarter-finals ==
In this round entered the 8 winners from the previous round.

Team 1	Score	Team 2
Puna Berat	0–5	Partizani
Puna Shkodër	2–0	Puna Tirana
Puna Durrës	1–2	Puna Vlorë
Dinamo Tirana	2–0 (w/o)	Spartaku Shkodër

== Semi-finals ==
In this round entered the four winners from the previous round.

Team 1	Score	Team 2
Partizani	4–0	Puna Shkodër
Puna Vlorë	0–3	Dinamo Tirana

== Final ==
14 October 1951

Partizani	2–3	Dinamo Tirana
Llambi 20'; Bakalli 52'		Peqini 57'; Tafmizi 70'; Vogli 78' (o.g.)

Qemal Stafa Stadium, Tirana
Referee: E. Dauti
