= 1970–71 Albanian Cup =

Kupa e Shqipërisë

Tournament details
- Country: Albania

Final positions
- Champions: Dinamo Tirana
- Runners-up: Besa

1970–71 Albanian Cup (Albanian: Kupa e Shqipërisë) was the nineteenth season of Albania's annual cup competition. It began in August 1970 with the First Round and ended in May 1971 with the Final match. Partizani were the defending champions, having won their ninth Albanian Cup last season. The cup was won by Dinamo Tirana.

The rounds were played in a one-legged format similar to those of European competitions. If the number of goals was equal, the match was decided by extra time and a penalty shootout, if necessary.

== First round ==
Games were played in August 1970*

- Results unknown

== Second round ==
In this round entered the 16 winners from the previous round. First and second legs were played in January 1971.

Team 1	Score	Team 2
Dinamo Tirana	2–0	Naftëtari
17 Nëntori	3–1	Skënderbeu
Apolonia	1–1 (p)	Tomori
Labinoti	2–1	Luftëtari
Partizani	2–1	Lokomotiva Durrës
Besa	5–1	Besëlidhja
Traktori	2–1	Flamurtari
Tekstilisti	1–2	Vllaznia

== Quarter-finals ==
In this round entered the 8 winners from the previous round.

Team 1	Score	Team 2
Partizani	2–0	Labinoti
Apolonia	0–0 (p)	17 Nëntori
Vllaznia	0–1	Dinamo Tirana
Besa	2–1	Traktori

== Semi-finals ==
In this round entered the four winners from the previous round.

Team 1	Score	Team 2
Dinamo Tirana	4–0	Apolonia
Besa	2–1	Partizani

== Final ==
May 1971

Dinamo Tirana	2–0	Besa
Xhafa 10'; Çeço 17'

Qemal Stafa Stadium, Tirana
Attendance: 3,000
Referee: R. Pregja
