= 1979–80 Albanian Cup =

Kupa e Shqipërisë

Tournament details
- Country: Albania

Final positions
- Champions: Partizani
- Runners-up: Labinoti

1979–80 Albanian Cup (Albanian: Kupa e Shqipërisë) was the twenty-eighth season of Albania's annual cup competition. It began in August 1979 with the First Round and ended in May 1980 with the Final matches. The winners of the competition qualified for the 1980-81 first round of the UEFA Cup. Vllaznia were the defending champions, having won their third Albanian Cup last season. The cup was won by KF Partizani.

The rounds were played in a two-legged format similar to those of European competitions. If the aggregated score was tied after both games, the team with the higher number of away goals advanced. If the number of away goals was equal in both games, the match was decided by extra time and a penalty shootout, if necessary.

== First round ==
Games were played on August & September 1979*

- Results unknown

== Second round ==
In this round entered the 16 winners from the previous round. First and second legs were played in January 1980.

Team 1	Agg.	Team 2	1st leg	2nd leg
Partizani	8–3	Apolonia	5–3	3–0
Shkëndija Tirana	0–3	Flamurtari	0–1	0–2
Naftëtari	2–4	Luftëtari	1–0	1–4
Skënderbeu	2–2 (a)	Besa	0–0	2–2
17 Nëntori	5–2	Dajti	3–2	2–0
Lokomotiva Durrës	1–4	Dinamo Tirana	1–1	0–3
Traktori	1–3	Vllaznia	1–0	0–3
Tomori	1–2	Labinoti	0–0	1–2

== Quarter-finals ==
In this round entered the 8 winners from the previous round.

Team 1	Agg.	Team 2	1st leg	2nd leg
Dinamo Tirana	2–2 (5–4 p)	17 Nëntori	1–1	1–1
Flamurtari	1–1 (a)	Partizani	1–1	0–0
Luftëtari	1–2	Skënderbeu	0–1	1–1
Labinoti	7–6	Vllaznia	4–3	3–3

== Semi-finals ==
In this round entered the four winners from the previous round.

Team 1	Agg.	Team 2	1st leg	2nd leg
Labinoti	4–2	Skënderbeu	2–0	2–2
Dinamo Tirana	1–2	Partizani	1–1	0–1

== Finals ==
In this round entered the two winners from the previous round.

Team 1	Agg.	Team 2	1st leg	2nd leg
Labinoti	1–2	Partizani	1–1	0–1

=== First leg ===
20 February 1980

Labinoti	1–1	Partizani
Baba 87' (pen.)		Ballgjini 72'

Rudi Bizhuta Stadium, Elbasan
Attendance: 14,000
Referee: Mehmet Myshku

=== Second leg ===
24 February 1980

Partizani	1–0	Labinoti
Rragami 15'

Qemal Stafa Stadium, Tirana
Referee: Shefqet Caslli
