= 1950 Albanian Cup =

Kupa e Shqipërisë

Tournament details
- Country: Albania

Final positions
- Champions: Dinamo Tirana
- Runners-up: Partizani

1950 Albanian Cup (Albanian: Kupa e Shqipërisë) was the fourth season of Albania's annual cup competition. It began in spring 1950 with the First Round and ended in May 1950 with the Final match. Partizani were the defending champions, having won their second Albanian Cup last season. The cup was won by Dinamo Tirana.

The rounds were played in a one-legged format. If the number of goals was equal, the match was decided by extra time and a penalty shootout, if necessary.

== First round ==
Games were played in March, 1950*

- Results unknown.

== Second round ==
Games were played in March, 1950.

Team 1	Score	Team 2
Puna Elbasan	2–2	Puna Korçë^{+}
Spartaku Berat	0–1	Puna Tirana
Puna Kavajë	1–4	Partizani
Puna Ersekë	0–2	Puna Shkodër
Garnizoni Gjirokastrës	1–6	Dinamo Tirana
Puna Vlorë	3–2	Puna Berat
Puna Fier	2–0 (w/o)	Garnizoni Tirana
Garnizoni Durrës	3–1	Puna Durrës

^{+} Puna Korçë won by corners.

== Quarter-finals ==
In this round entered the 8 winners from the previous round.

Team 1	Score	Team 2
Partizani	2–0	Puna Shkodër
Dinamo Tirana	10–0	Puna Vlorë
Garnizoni Durrës	2–1	Puna Fier
Puna Tirana	2–0 (w/o)	Puna Korçë

== Semi-finals ==
In this round entered the four winners from the previous round*

Team 1	Score	Team 2
Partizani	–	Puna Tirana
Garnizoni Durrës	–	Dinamo Tirana

- Results unknown. All is known Partizani and Dinamo Tirana qualified.

== Final ==
29 November 1950

Dinamo Tirana	2–1	Partizani
Bakalli 26'; Jareci 35'		Parapani 41'

Qemal Stafa Stadium, Tirana
Referee: Ejup Laçi
