= Lin Shllaku =

Albanian footballer

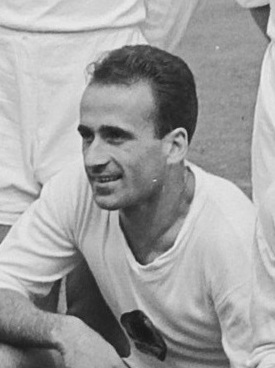

Personal information
- Full name: Lin Shllaku
- Date of birth: 12 July 1938
- Place of birth: Shkodër, Albania
- Date of death: 8 August 2016 (aged 78)
- Place of death: Tirana, Albania
- Position: Midfielder

Senior career*
Years	Team	Apps	(Gls)
1955–1956	Vllaznia		
1956–1971	Partizani		

International career
1963–1970	Albania	15	(0)

Managerial career
- 1972–1973: Partizani (assistant)
- 1973–1974: Besëlidhja
- 1974–1975: Partizani (assistant)
- * Club domestic league appearances and goals

Lin Shllaku (12 July 1938 – 8 August 2016) was an Albanian footballer who played for Vllaznia Shkodër and Partizani Tirana, as well as the Albania national team.

== Playing career ==
=== Club ===
Born in Shkodër, Shllaku started with local club Vllaznia but played the largest part of his career for army club Partizani, with whom he won 7 league titles. He also won 7 domestic cups and was Partizani and national team captain for 7 years.

=== International ===
He made his debut for Albania in a June 1963 Olympic Games qualification match against Bulgaria and earned a total of 15 caps, scoring no goals. His final international was an October 1970 European Championship qualification away against Poland.

== Managerial career ==
After retiring as a player, he became an assistant at Partizani before being named coach of Besëlidhja.

== Personal life ==
After the fall of communism, Shllaku lived in Kavala, Greece for 12 years.

=== Death ===
He died of a lung disease on 8 August 2016 at the Shefqet Ndroqi Hospital.

== Honours ==
- Albanian Superliga: 7

1957, 1958, 1959, 1961, 1963, 1964, 1971
