= 1954 Albanian Cup =

Kupa e Shqipërisë

Tournament details
- Country: Albania

Final positions
- Champions: Dinamo Tirana
- Runners-up: Partizani

1954 Albanian Cup (Albanian: Kupa e Shqipërisë) was the eighth season of Albania's annual cup competition. It began in Spring 1954 with the First Round and ended in May 1954 with the Final match. Dinamo Tirana were the defending champions, having won their fourth Albanian Cup last season. The cup was won by Dinamo Tirana.

The rounds were played in a one-legged format similar to those of European competitions. If the number of goals was equal, the match was decided by extra time and a penalty shootout, if necessary.

== First round ==
First and second legs were played in March, 1954.

Team 1	Score	Team 2
Dinamo Tirana	2–0 (w/o)	Spartaku Vlorë
Spartaku Shkodër	1–0	Puna Elbasan
Puna Tirana	2–0	Puna Korçë
Spartaku Pogradec	2–1	Puna Shkodër
Dinamo Durrësi	2–0	Puna Kavajë
Puna Lushnjë	1–2	Luftëtari i Sh.B.O. "Enver Hoxha"
Puna Vlorë	0–3	Partizani
Spartak Tirana	2–0	Puna Durrës

== Quarter-finals ==
In this round entered the 8 winners from the previous round.

Team 1	Score	Team 2
Spartaku Shkodër	0–0 (2–1 p)	Spartaku Pogradec
Dinamo Tirana	3–2	Spartak Tirana
Luftëtari i Sh.B.O. "Enver Hoxha"	3–0	Dinamo Durrës
Partizani	2–0	Puna Tirana

== Semi-finals ==
In this round entered the four winners from the previous round.

Team 1	Score	Team 2
Partizani	4–2	Spartaku Shkodër
Dinamo Tirana	2–0 (w/o)	Luftëtari i Sh.B.O. "Enver Hoxha"

== Final ==
7 November 1954

Dinamo Tirana	2–1	Partizani
Begeja 37', 48'		Deda 5'

Qemal Stafa Stadium, Tirana
Referee: B. Hamdiu
