= Millan Baçi =

Albanian footballer

Personal information
- Full name: Millan Baçi
- Date of birth: 3 November 1955 (age 70)
- Place of birth: Tirana, Albania
- Height: 1.82 m (6 ft 0 in)
- Position: Right back

Senior career*
Years	Team	Apps	(Gls)
1975–1985	17 Nëntori Tirana		

International career
1976–1981	Albania	7	(1)

Managerial career
- 1998: Tirana
- * Club domestic league appearances and goals

Millan Baçi (born 3 November 1955, in Albania) is a former Albanian football player.

== Club career ==
He spent his entire career with 17 Nëntori Tirana. His main position was wing back, with the right wing as his favourite.

== International career ==
Baçi made his debut for Albania in a November 1976 friendly match against Algeria and has earned a total of 7 caps, scoring 1 goal. He has represented his country in 5 FIFA World Cup qualification matches.

His final international was an October 1981 World Cup qualification match against Bulgaria.

== Retirement ==
He works in the youth department of the Albanian Football Association (F.SH.F). He is a notable personality in the football world, and a football critic as well.

== Honours ==
- Albanian Superliga: 2

1982, 1985
