= 1953 Albanian Cup =

Kupa e Shqipërisë

Tournament details
- Country: Albania

Final positions
- Champions: Dinamo Tirana
- Runners-up: KF Partizani

1953 Albanian Cup (Albanian: Kupa e Shqipërisë) was the seventh season of Albania's annual cup competition. It began in Spring 1953 with the First Round and ended in May 1953 with the Final match. Dinamo Tirana were the defending champions, having won their third Albanian Cup last season. The cup was won by Dinamo Tirana.

The rounds were played in a one-legged format similar to those of European competitions. If the number of goals was equal, the match was decided by extra time and a penalty shootout, if necessary.

== First round ==
Games were played in March, 1953.

Team 1	Score	Team 2
Dinamo Shkodër	4–1	Uzina F.Duhanit Shkodër
Puna Durrës	2–0	Spartaku Pogradec
Tekstilisti Stalin	1–0	Teknikumi i Fizikulturës Tirana
Puna Vlorë	1–2	Puna Berat
Garnizoni Durrës	2–1	Puna Lushnjë
Puna Qyteti Stalin	2–0 (w/o)	Puna Tepelenë
Spartak Tirana^{+}	1–1	Puna Kavajë
Spartaku Korçë	1–0	Puna Korçë

^{+} Spartak Tirana won by draw.

== Second round ==
Games were played in March, 1953*

Team 1	Score	Team 2
Garnizoni Durrës	4–1	Puna Qyteti Stalin
Puna Durrës	2–0 (w/o)	Dinamo Shkodër
Puna Berat	3–1	Tekstilisti Stalin
Spartaku Korçë	0–1	Spartak Tirana
Dinamo Tirana	bye	
Partizani	bye	
Puna Shkodër	bye	
Puna Tirana	bye	

== Quarter-finals ==
In this round entered the 8 winners from the previous round.

Team 1	Score	Team 2
Puna Durrës	0–3	Dinamo Tirana
Puna Tirana	4–0	Garnizoni Durrës
Puna Shkodër	1–1	Spartak Tirana^{+}
Partizani	10–0	Puna Berat

^{+} Spartak Tirana won by draw.

== Semi-finals ==
In this round entered the four winners from the previous round.

Team 1	Score	Team 2
Partizani	3–0	Spartak Tirana
Dinamo Tirana	3–0	Puna Tirana

== Final ==
17 January 1954

Dinamo Tirana	2–0	Partizani
Jareci 32'; Begeja 70'

Qemal Stafa Stadium, Tirana
