= 1973–74 Albanian Cup =

Kupa e Shqipërisë

Tournament details
- Country: Albania

Final positions
- Champions: Dinamo Tirana
- Runners-up: Partizani

1973–74 Albanian Cup (Albanian: Kupa e Shqipërisë) was the twenty-second season of Albania's annual cup competition. It began in August 1973 with the First Round and ended in May 1974 with the Final match. The winners of the competition qualified for the 1974-75 first round of the UEFA Cup. Partizani were the defending champions, having won their tenth Albanian Cup last season. The cup was won by Dinamo Tirana.

The rounds were played in a two-legged format similar to those of European competitions. If the aggregated score was tied after both games, the team with the higher number of away goals advanced. If the number of away goals was equal in both games, the match was decided by extra time and a penalty shootout, if necessary.

== First round ==
Games were played on August & September 1973*

- Results unknown

== Second round ==
In this round entered the 16 winners from the previous round. First and second legs were played in January 1974.

Team 1	Agg.	Team 2	1st leg	2nd leg
Partizani	4–2	Luftëtari	3–1	1–1
17 Nëntori	2–3	Flamurtari	2–2	0–1
Besëlidhja	2–1	Naftëtari	2–1	0–0
Lokomotiva Durrës	2–2 (p)	Traktori	1–1	1–1
Besa	0–1	Labinoti	0–0	0–1
Apolonia	2–6	Shkëndija Tirana	0–5	2–1
Skënderbeu	1–4	Dinamo Tirana	1–1	0–3
Tomori	3–8	Vllaznia	2–1	1–7

== Quarter-finals ==
In this round entered the 8 winners from the previous round.

Team 1	Agg.	Team 2	1st leg	2nd leg
Shkëndija Tirana	2–4	Dinamo Tirana	2–2	0–2
Partizani	0–0 (p)	Labinoti	0–0	0–0
Besëlidhja	0–1	Traktori	0–0	0–1
Flamurtari	1–1 (p)	Vllaznia	0–0	1–1

== Semi-finals ==
In this round entered the four winners from the previous round.

Team 1	Agg.	Team 2	1st leg	2nd leg
Dinamo Tirana	2–0	Vllaznia	1–0	1–0
Traktori	2–2 (p)	Partizani	2–0	0–2

== Final ==
10 March 1974

Dinamo Tirana	1–0	Partizani
Xhafa 80'

Qemal Stafa Stadium, Tirana
Attendance: 18,000
Referee: S. Caslli
