= 1974–75 Albanian National Championship =

Albanian National Championship
- Season: 1974–75
- Champions: Dinamo Tirana; 10th Albanian title
- Relegated: Skënderbeu; Besëlidhja; Punëtori
- European Cup: None
- UEFA Cup: None
- Cup Winners' Cup: None
- Matches: 182
- Goals: 380 (2.09 per match)
- Top goalscorer: Ilir Përnaska (17 goals)

The 1974–75 Albanian National Championship was the 36th season of the Albanian National Championship, the top professional league for association football clubs, since its establishment in 1930.

== Overview ==
It was contested by 14 teams, and Dinamo Tirana won the championship.

== League table ==
Pos	Team	Pld	W	D	L	GF	GA	GD	Pts	Qualification or relegation
1	Dinamo Tirana (C)	26	20	4	2	58	13	+45	44	Champions
2	Vllaznia	26	16	7	3	41	16	+25	39	
3	Partizani	26	12	10	4	36	16	+20	34	
4	17 Nëntori	26	9	15	2	30	17	+13	33	
5	Labinoti	26	10	10	6	32	22	+10	30	
6	Besa	26	10	8	8	23	22	+1	28	
7	Lokomotiva Durrës	26	8	11	7	27	23	+4	27	
8	Traktori	26	9	9	8	26	29	−3	27	
9	Shkëndija Tiranë	26	8	9	9	27	27	0	25	
10	Naftëtari	26	9	7	10	23	25	−2	25	
11	Flamurtari	26	7	8	11	20	31	−11	22	
12	Skënderbeu (R)	26	6	5	15	22	35	−13	17	Relegation to the 1975–76 Kategoria e Dytë
13	Besëlidhja (R)	26	2	4	20	8	44	−36	8	Relegation to the 1975–76 Kategoria e Dytë
14	Punëtori (R)	26	2	1	23	7	60	−53	5	Relegation to the 1975–76 Kategoria e Dytë

Source: RSSSF.org
(C) Champions; (R) Relegated

Note: '17 Nëntori' is Tirana, 'Labinoti' is Elbasani, 'Lokomotiva Durrës' is Teuta, 'Traktori' is Lushnja, 'Punëtori' is Albpetrol

== Results ==
Home \ Away	17N	BES	BSL	DIN	FLA	LAB	LOK	NAF	PAR	PUN	SKË	SHK	TRA	VLL
17 Nëntori		1–1	2–1	2–2	2–0	1–1	1–0	1–0	2–1	4–0	1–1	3–2	0–0	0–1
Besa	0–0		2–1	1–1	1–1	1–0	2–0	0–2	1–1	1–0	1–0	0–1	4–0	1–0
Besëlidhja	0–1	0–0		0–1	2–1	0–0	0–0	0–1	0–2	2–1	0–0	0–1	0–2	0–2
Dinamo	1–1	2–0	3–0		5–0	0–1	2–1	2–0	2–1	6–0	3–1	5–0	5–1	1–0
Flamurtari	0–0	1–0	1–0	0–2		1–0	1–1	3–0	1–1	2–1	2–1	1–1	0–0	0–0
Labinoti	2–2	1–1	1–0	2–0	2–1		2–2	3–1	0–1	3–0	3–1	0–0	3–1	1–1
Lokomotiva	0–0	0–1	3–0	0–1	1–1	1–1		3–2	1–1	1–0	2–1	1–1	1–0	3–0
Naftëtari	1–1	1–1	3–1	0–2	1–0	1–0	0–0		0–0	4–0	1–0	1–0	0–0	0–0
Partizani	0–0	2–0	2–0	1–2	2–0	3–1	2–1	1–0		4–0	4–0	2–0	1–1	1–1
Punëtori	0–3	0–1	1–0	1–4	1–0	0–2	0–1	0–3	0–1		1–2	0–1	0–0	0–2
Skënderbeu	0–0	3–2	1–0	0–2	0–1	0–0	2–3	1–0	0–0	2–0		1–0	0–1	0–1
Shkëndija	1–1	3–0	4–0	0–2	3–2	0–0	0–0	0–0	0–0	5–1	0–2		3–2	0–0
Traktori	1–1	1–0	4–0	0–2	1–0	1–2	0–0	2–0	1–1	2–0	3–2	1–0		1–1
Vllaznia	1–0	1–0	5–1	0–0	3–0	2–1	2–1	4–1	2–1	4–0	3–2	2–1	3–0	

Source: CalcioMondialeWeb.it
Legend: Blue = home team win; Yellow = draw; Red = away team win.
