= 1958 Albanian National Championship =

Albanian National Championship
- Season: 1958
- Champions: Partizani

The 1958 Albanian National Championship was the 21st season of the Albanian National Championship, the top professional league for association football clubs, since its establishment in 1930.

== Overview ==
It was contested by 8 teams, and Partizani won the championship.

== League standings ==
| Pos | Team | Pld | W | D | L | GF | GA | GR | Pts | Qualification or relegation |
|---|---|---|---|---|---|---|---|---|---|---|
| 1 | Partizani (C) | 14 | 7 | 5 | 2 | 27 | 12 | 2.250 | 19 | Champions |
| 2 | Besa | 14 | 7 | 4 | 3 | 17 | 14 | 1.214 | 18 | |
| 3 | 17 Nëntori | 14 | 4 | 9 | 1 | 15 | 9 | 1.667 | 17 | |
| 4 | Dinamo Tirana | 14 | 6 | 4 | 4 | 28 | 18 | 1.556 | 16 | |
| 5 | Skënderbeu | 14 | 3 | 6 | 5 | 9 | 16 | 0.563 | 12 | |
| 6 | Vllaznia | 14 | 3 | 5 | 6 | 14 | 22 | 0.636 | 11 | |
| 7 | Flamurtari | 14 | 3 | 4 | 7 | 11 | 21 | 0.524 | 10 | |
| 8 | Lokomotiva Durrës (R) | 14 | 3 | 3 | 8 | 11 | 20 | 0.550 | 9 | Relegation to the 1959 Kategoria e Dytë |

Source: RSSSF.org
(C) Champions; (R) Relegated

Note: '17 Nëntori' is KF Tirana and 'Lokomotiva Durrës' is Teuta

== Results ==
| Home \ Away | 17N | BES | DIN | FLA | LOK | PAR | SKË | VLL |
|---|---|---|---|---|---|---|---|---|
| 17 Nëntori | | 1–1 | 4–0 | 2–0 | 1–0 | 2–2 | 0–0 | 0–0 |
| Besa | 1–1 | | 2–0 | 2–0 | 2–0 | 2–1 | 0–0 | 3–1 |
| Dinamo | 0–1 | 0–0 | | 4–0 | 3–1 | 0–0 | 5–0 | 6–1 |
| Flamurtari | 0–0 | 1–2 | 1–2 | | 2–1 | 1–1 | 2–0 | 1–0 |
| Lokomotiva | 0–0 | 1–2 | 1–1 | 2–1 | | 0–1 | 2–1 | 2–1 |
| Partizani | 4–2 | 4–0 | 2–2 | 3–0 | 3–0 | | 4–1 | 1–0 |
| Skënderbeu | 0–0 | 2–0 | 1–1 | 1–1 | 0–0 | 1–0 | | 2–0 |
| Vllaznia | 1–1 | 2–0 | 4–3 | 1–1 | 2–1 | 1–1 | 0–0 | |

Source: CalcioMondialeWeb.it
Legend: Blue = home team win; Yellow = draw; Red = away team win.
