= Albanian Cup =

Knock-out football tournament in Albania

- Founded: 1938
- Region: Albania
- Teams: 44
- Qualifier for: UEFA Conference League
- Domestic cup: Albanian Supercup
- Current champions: Dinamo City (15th title)
- Most championships: Tirana (16 titles)
- Broadcaster: RTSH
- Website: fshf.org
- 2026–27 Albanian Cup

The Albanian Cup (Albanian: Kupa e Shqipërisë) is the main "knockout" competition in Albanian football. The competition started in 1939 as Kupa e Mbretit (English:"The King's Cup"). The cup was suspended for the next eight years as the Second World War started. It started again in 1948 as "Kupa e Republikës" (English: "Republic Cup") and from 1991 as "Kupa e Shqipërisë" (Albanian Cup). Today it is the second most important competition in Albania after the Kategoria Superiore.

The winners of the Cup automatically earn the right to participate in the first qualifying round of the UEFA Conference League.

== Finals results ==
Season	Winner	Score	Runner-up
1938–39	Tirana	RR	Vllaznia
1940–47	Not played		
1948	Partizani	5–2	Tirana
1949	Partizani	1–0	Tirana
1950	Dinamo Tirana	2–1	Partizani
1951	Dinamo Tirana	3–2	Partizani
1952	Dinamo Tirana	4–1	Tirana
1953	Dinamo Tirana	2–0	Partizani
1954	Dinamo Tirana	2–1	Partizani
1955–1956	Not played		
1957	Partizani	2–0	Lokomotiva Durrës
1958	Partizani	4–0	Skënderbeu
1959	Not played		
1960	Dinamo Tirana	2–0 agg.	Flamurtari
1961	Partizani	2–1 agg.	Besa
1962	Not played		
1962–63	Tirana	3–3 agg. 4–2 (p)	Besa
1963–64	Partizani	3–0	Tomori
1964–65	Vllaznia	1–0	Skënderbeu
1965–66	Partizani	6–4 agg.	Vllaznia
1966–67	Not played		
1967–68	Partizani	4–1	Vllaznia
1968–69	Not played		
1969–70	Partizani	4–1 agg.	Vllaznia
1970–71	Dinamo Tirana	2–0	Besa
1971–72	Vllaznia	2–2 agg. 4–3 (p)	Besa
1972–73	Partizani	1–0	Dinamo Tirana
1973–74	Dinamo Tirana	1–0	Partizani
1974–75	Elbasani	2–0 agg.	Lokomotiva Durrës
1975–76	Tirana	4–1 agg.	Skënderbeu
1976–77	Tirana	3–3 agg. 4–3 (p)	Dinamo Tirana
1977–78	Dinamo Tirana	1–0 agg.	Lushnja
1978–79	Vllaznia	3–2 agg.	Dinamo Tirana
1979–80	Partizani	2–1 agg.	Elbasani
1980–81	Vllaznia	6–3 agg.	Besa
1981–82	Dinamo Tirana	3–3 agg. (a)	Tirana
1982–83	Tirana	1–0	Flamurtari
1983–84	Tirana	2–1	Flamurtari
1984–85	Flamurtari	2–1	Partizani
1985–86	Tirana	3–1	Vllaznia
1986–87	Vllaznia	4–3 agg.	Flamurtari
1987–88	Flamurtari	1–0	Partizani
1988–89	Dinamo Tirana	0–0, 3–1 (R)	Partizani
1989–90	Dinamo Tirana	1–1 (aet); 4–2 (p)	Flamurtari
1990–91	Partizani	1–1 (a.e.t.); 4–3 (p)	Flamurtari
1991–92	Elbasani	2–1	Besa
1992–93	Partizani	1–0	Albpetrol
1993–94	Tirana	1–0 agg.	Teuta
1994–95	Teuta	0–0 (a.e.t.); 4–3 (p)	Tirana
1995–96	Tirana	1–1 (a.e.t.); 4–3 (p)	Flamurtari
1996–97	Partizani	2–2 (a.e.t.); 4–3 (p)	Flamurtari
1997–98	Apolonia	1–0	Lushnja
1998–99	Tirana	0–0 (a.e.t.); 3–0 (p)	Vllaznia
1999–2000	Teuta	0–0 (a.e.t.); 5–4 (p)	Lushnja
2000–01	Tirana	5–0	Teuta
2001–02	Tirana	1–0	Dinamo Tirana
2002–03	Dinamo Tirana	1–0	Teuta
2003–04	Partizani	1–0	Dinamo Tirana
2004–05	Teuta	0–0 (a.e.t.); 6–5 (p)	Tirana
2005–06	Tirana	1–0	Vllaznia
2006–07	Besa	3–2	Teuta
2007–08	Vllaznia	2–0	Tirana
2008–09	Flamurtari	2–1	Tirana
2009–10	Besa	2–1 (a.e.t.)	Vllaznia
2010–11	Tirana	1–1 (a.e.t.); 4–3 (p)	Dinamo Tirana
2011–12	Tirana	1–0 (a.e.t.)	Skënderbeu
2012–13	Laçi	1–0 (a.e.t.)	Bylis
2013–14	Flamurtari	1–0	Kukësi
2014–15	Laçi	2–1	Kukësi
2015–16	Kukësi	1–1 (a.e.t.); 5–4 (p)	Laçi
2016–17	Tirana	3–1 (a.e.t.)	Skënderbeu
2017–18	Skënderbeu	1–0	Laçi
2018–19	Kukësi	2–1	Tirana
2019–20	Teuta	2–0	Tirana
2020–21	Vllaznia	1–0	Skënderbeu
2021–22	Vllaznia	2–1 (a.e.t.)	Laçi
2022–23	Egnatia	1–0 (a.e.t.)	Tirana
2023–24	Egnatia	1–0	Kukësi
2024–25	Dinamo City	2–2 (a.e.t.); 5–4 (p)	Egnatia
2025–26	Dinamo City	3–2	Egnatia

== Performances by club ==
Club	Winners	Runners-up	Winning Years
Tirana (also as 17 Nëntori)	16	11	1939, 1963, 1976, 1977, 1983, 1984, 1986, 1994, 1996, 1999, 2001, 2002, 2006, 2011, 2012, 2017
Partizani	15	8	1948, 1949, 1957, 1958, 1961, 1964, 1966, 1968, 1970, 1973, 1980, 1991, 1993, 1997, 2004
Dinamo City (also as Dinamo Tirana)	15	6	1950, 1951, 1952, 1953, 1954, 1960, 1971, 1974, 1978, 1982, 1989, 1990, 2003, 2025, 2026
Vllaznia	8	8	1965, 1972, 1979, 1981, 1987, 2008, 2021, 2022
Flamurtari	4	8	1985, 1988, 2009, 2014
Teuta (also as Lokomotiva Durrës)	4	6	1995, 2000, 2005, 2020
Besa	2	6	2007, 2010
Laçi	2	3	2013, 2015
Kukësi	2	3	2016, 2019
Egnatia	2	2	2023, 2024
Elbasani (also as Labinoti )	2	1	1975, 1992
Skënderbeu	1	6	2018
Apolonia	1	–	1998
Lushnja (also as Traktori)	–	3	–
Tomori	–	1	–
Albpetrol	–	1	–
Bylis	–	1	–

=== Appearances ===
At least 20 Cup appearances.

Club	Appearances	Winners	Runners-up	Semi-finals	Quarter-finals
Tirana	68	16	10	36	55
Vllaznia	68	7	8	28	51
Teuta	68	4	6	19	41
Partizani	66	15	8	31	49
Flamurtari	66	4	8	20	37
Skënderbeu	65	1	6	15	30
KS Elbasani	64	2	1	9	31
KS Dinamo Tirana	63	13	6	30	44
Besa	63	2	6	11	21
Apolonia	55	1	—	8	18
Luftëtari	48	—	—	3	10
Besëlidhja	47	—	—	2	8
Kastrioti	35	—	—	1	3
Shkumbini	32	—	—	3	10
KF Laçi	29	2	2	2	6

== See also ==
- Albanian Supercup
