= Shkëndija Tiranë =

Albanian football club

- Full name: Shkëndija Tiranë
- Founded: 1970; 56 years ago
- Ground: Qendra e Ekipeve Kombëtare, Kamëz
- Chairman: Ermal Tahiri
- Manager: Ervin Bulku
- 2020: Kategoria e Tretë, 8th (withdrew)
- Website: loroborici.vet.al
Home colours	Away colours

Shkëndija Tiranë is an Albanian football club based in Tirana, and is the football team of the Sports mastery school Loro Boriçi. The academy is famous for being one of the most successful in the country and has produced 35 Albanian international footballers. The club's glory days were in the 1970s where they were regulars in the Kategoria Superiore and were featured in the Balkans Cup in 1971–72. In 1986, the club was renamed Studenti ILFK Tirana, but was reverted to Shkëndija Tiranë. The club does not currently compete in the senior football league.

== History ==
In December 2010, Sulejman Mema took over the club, as principal of the Loro Boriçi School.

The club uses the Albania national team sport centre in Kamëz, Tirana for training and matches.

== Honours ==
=== Under-17s ===
- Tirana U17 Championship: 2012–13

=== Under-19s ===
- National U19 Championship (15):
  - 1969–70, 1971–72, 1972–73, 1974–75, 1975–76, 1977–78, 1982–83, 1984–85, 1985–86, 1987–88, 1989–90, 2002–2003, 2012–13, 2018-2019
