= Xhevdet Shaqiri =

Albanian footballer and coach

Personal information
- Date of birth: 5 January 1923
- Place of birth: Dudas, Shkodër, Albania
- Date of death: 11 September 1997 (aged 74)
- Place of death: Tirana, Albania
- Position: Defender

Senior career*
Years	Team	Apps	(Gls)
1945–1947	Vllaznia		
1948–1949	Partizani		
1950–1958	Dinamo Tirana		

International career
1947–1957	Albania	14	(0)

Managerial career
- Dinamo Tirana
- Lushnja
- 1966–1979: Vllaznia
- * Club domestic league appearances and goals

Xhevdet Shaqiri (5 January 1923 – 11 September 1997) was an Albanian football player and coach.

== Playing career ==
=== Club ===
He played as a defender for Vllaznia Shkodër, Partizani Tirana and Dinamo Tirana during his playing career and won 9 league titles with them. He became the league's top goalscorer in 1946 with 11 goals.

=== International ===
He made his debut for Albania in a September 1947 Balkan Cup match against Yugoslavia and earned a total of 14 caps, scoring no goals. His final international was a September 1957 friendly match against China.

== Managerial career ==
After retiring as a player, he coached Dinamo Tirana, KS Lushnja and most notably hometown club Vllaznia for 13 years between 1966 and 1979.

== Honours ==
as a player

- Albanian Superliga: 9

1946, 1948, 1949, 1950, 1951, 1952, 1953, 1955, 1956

as a manager

- Albanian Superliga: 3

1972, 1974, 1978
