= Astrit Hafizi =

Albanian footballer and coach

Personal information
- Full name: Astrit Hafizi
- Date of birth: 15 September 1953 (age 73)
- Place of birth: Shkodër, Albania
- Position: Midfielder

Senior career*
Years	Team	Apps	(Gls)
1968-1975	Shkëndija		
1975-1984	Vllaznia		
1976	→ Dinamo Tirana '(loan)'		
1982-1983	→ 17 Nëntori '(loan)'		

Managerial career
- 1985–1988: Vllaznia
- 1990–1995: Vllaznia
- 1996: Albania U-21
- 1997–1999: Albania
- 2001: Dinamo Tirana
- 2002: Vllaznia
- 2007–2008: Tirana
- * Club domestic league appearances and goals

Astrit Hafizi (born 15 September 1953) is an Albanian former footballer and coach of Vllaznia, as well as coach of Albania for a two years span (1997–1999).

== Playing career ==
=== Club ===
Born in Shkodër, a city located in Northern Albania. Hafizi was brought to Shkëndija Tiranë by Zyber Konçi, but was ordered back to Shkodër and played the remainder of his career with hometown club Vllaznia with whom he won two league titles in a team also featuring international player Luan Vukatana. In 1976 however, he was temporarily "loaned" to Dinamo Tirana to play for them in the Balkans Cup. He played both home games against Dinamo Zagreb and Ethnikos but was unexpectedly expelled from the team for the away matches and subsequently returned to Vllaznia. He later also played with Vukatana for 17 Nëntori in the Balkans Cup against Larissa.

== Managerial career ==
When Vllaznia released him at only 31 years of age, because they wanted a new and younger team, the club persuaded him to become a coach and he became manager of the club a year later, replacing Ramazan Rragami.

In November 1987, Hafizi was suspended for two years by the communist regime for his role in a defection of Vllaznia players Lulëzim Bërshemi and Arvid Hoxha in Athens after a 1987–88 European Cup Winners' Cup match away against RoPS. He was, alongside club captain Ferid Rragami and two staff members, set to work in Pult as a school teacher and brought back to Shkodër 6 months later after the communist party leaders said he had "learned from his mistake". He was suspended by the authorities once more in 1991 for an incident in London with the Albania U-21 team.

== Personal life ==
His brother-in-law is Hysen Dedja, who also played for and managed Vllaznia.

== Honours ==
as a player

- Albanian Superliga: 2

1978, 1983

as a manager

- Albanian Superliga: 1

1992
