= Ramazan Rragami =

Albanian footballer and coach (1944–2022)

Personal information
- Date of birth: 3 April 1944
- Place of birth: Shkodër, Albania
- Date of death: 15 January 2022 (aged 77)
- Position: Midfielder

Senior career*
Years	Team	Apps	(Gls)
1960–1964	Vllaznia		
1964–1971	Partizani		
1971–1977	Vllaznia		
1977–1978	Skënderbeu		

International career
1965–1973	Albania	20	(1)

Managerial career
- 1982–1983: Vllaznia
- 1983–1984: Albania U-21
- 1999–2000: Vllaznia
- * Club domestic league appearances and goals

Ramazan Rragami (3 April 1944 – 15 January 2022) was an Albanian football player and coach. He played for the Albania national team and for Vllaznia Shkodër, becoming one of the club's most notable players of all time. He became a member of The Disciplinary Committee affiliated with The Albanian Football Federation.

== Club career ==
Ramazan Rragami had a brilliant career as a player as well as a coach in the national and international arena. He started playing in his native town, Vllaznia, at the age of 16. He continued there until 1967 when he was recruited by the Partizani team of Tirana and played there until 1970. He returned to Vllaznia in 1970 and, in 1972, won both the league title and League Cup. In the final game of the League Cup, Rragami scored seven times from the penalty spot, twice during regular time and five additional penalty kicks after an aggregate tie. This is the first and last time a player has scored all penalties for one team. FIFA regulations at that time allowed one player to execute all penalty kicks after a regular game tie. FIFA has since changed the rule and different players are now required to make the attempt. Rragami was part of a famous football threesome from Shkodër with Medin Zhega and Sabah Bizi.

== International career ==
Rragami made his debut for Albania in a May 1965 FIFA World Cup qualification match against Switzerland and earned a total of 20 caps, scoring 1 goal, from 1965 to 1973. He was the lone goalscorer in Albania's first ever World Cup qualification win over Finland in 1973 and he played in the famous 0–0 draw with European powerhouse West Germany in December 1967.

His final international was a November 1973 FIFA World Cup qualification match against East Germany.

== Managerial career ==
Rragami began his coaching career while he was still playing in 1972. Upon finishing his career as a player he started as a full-time coach with KS Vllaznia where he won the league in the 1982–1983 season. At the same time he was the assistant coach for the Albania national under-21 football team, which reached the quarter finals of the Euro 84. They became the first Albanian team in any level to qualify for a competitive tournament.

Ramazan Rragami then studied in Coverciano in Italy where he received his coaching certification in one of the most prestigious coaching schools in the world.

== Personal life and death ==
Rragami died on 15 January 2022, at the age of 77.

== Honours ==
=== As a player ===
- Albanian Superliga: 1972, 1974

=== As coach ===
- Albanian Superliga: 1983
