= Sabah Bizi =

Albanian footballer (1946–2025)

Personal information
- Date of birth: 13 November 1946
- Place of birth: Shkodër, Albania
- Date of death: 16 January 2025 (aged 78)
- Position: Midfielder

Youth career
- 1964–1966: Vllaznia

Senior career*
Years	Team	Apps	(Gls)
1965–1968	Vllaznia		
1968–1971	Partizani		
1971–1982	Vllaznia		

International career
1967–1976	Albania	15	(1)
1969–1971	Albania U23	12	(2)

Managerial career
- 1986–1987: Veleçiku
- 1995: Vllaznia
- ?: Ada Velipojë U17
- * Club domestic league appearances and goals

Sabah Bizi (13 November 1946 – 16 January 2025) was an Albanian footballer who played for Vllaznia Shkodër and Partizani Tirana as well as the Albania national team.

== Club career ==
A Vllaznia club legend, Bizi won three league titles with the club during their most successful period in the 1970s, when he played alongside Ramazan Rragami among others, and also one with Partizani. When he joined the military, he was forced to play for army club Partizani. After three years in the army, he rejoined Vllaznia against the wishes of Partizani, At the time, one of the communist regime's top leaders visited Shkodër to see how a hydroelectric power station was being built and the workers involved in the construction demanded the return of Bizi to Vllaznia on condition that they complete the hydropower plant before the deadline. In the end, a deal was reached and Bizi ended his career at Vllaznia.

== International career ==
He made his debut for Albania in an April 1967 European Championship qualification match away against West Germany and earned a total of 15 caps, scoring 1 goal. His final international was a November 1976 friendly match against Algeria.

== Personal life and death ==
His son Brikeno also played for Vllaznia, winning two league titles in the 1990s. Bizi died on 16 January 2025, at the age of 78.

== Honours ==
Partizani

- Kategoria Superiore: 1971

Vllaznia

- Kategoria Superiore: 1972, 1974, 1978
