= Hysen Dedja =

Albanian footballer and manager

Personal information
- Full name: Hysen Dedja
- Date of birth: 16 October 1960 (age 66)
- Place of birth: Shkodër, PR Albania
- Position: Defender

Senior career*
Years	Team	Apps	(Gls)
1978–1995	Vllaznia Shkodër		

International career
1979–1982	Albania U21	17	(0)

Managerial career
- 1996–1998: Vllaznia
- 1998–1999: Bylis
- 1999–2000: Lushnja
- 2000: Luftëtari
- 2001: Lushnja
- 2001: Teuta
- 2002–2003: Vllaznia
- 2003–2004: Erzeni
- 2004: Laçi
- 2004: Egnatia
- 2005–2006: Vllaznia
- 2006–2007: Erzeni
- 2007: Teuta
- 2008–2009: Bylis
- 2017–2018: Lushnja
- 2020: Vllaznia
- * Club domestic league appearances and goals

Hysen Dedja (born 16 October 1960) is an Albanian football manager and former player.

== Playing career ==
A former defender and captain of his hometown club Vllaznia Shkodër, he made his debut for them on 16 October 1978, his 18th birthday, against Flamurtari. He won two league titles and 3 domestic cups with the club.

== Managerial career ==
Dedja had three coaching stints with Vllaznia, winning the Albanian Cup in 1998. He also managed Bylis in the 1999-2000 UEFA Cup. In 2017, he became coach of Lushnja after 8 years without a club.

== Personal life ==
His brother-in-law is Astrit Hafizi, who also played for Vllaznia and managed the club as well as the national team. His elder brother Menduh Dedja also played for 13 years for Vllaznia.

== Honours ==
Player

- Albanian Superliga: 2

1983, 1992

- Albanian Cup: 3

1979, 1981, 1987

Manager

- Albanian Cup: 1

1998
