= 1984–85 Albanian National Championship =

Albanian National Championship
- Season: 1984–85
- Champions: 17 Nëntori; 12th Albanian title
- Relegated: Besa; Skënderbeu
- European Cup: 17 Nëntori
- UEFA Cup: Dinamo Tirana
- Cup Winners' Cup: Flamurtari
- Matches: 182
- Goals: 364 (2 per match)
- Top goalscorer: Faslli Fakja; Arben Minga (13 goals)

The 1984–85 Albanian National Championship was the 46th season of the Albanian National Championship, the top professional league for association football clubs, since its establishment in 1930.

== Overview ==
It was contested by 14 teams, and 17 Nëntori won the championship.

== League table ==
Pos	Team	Pld	W	D	L	GF	GA	GD	Pts	Qualification or relegation
1	17 Nëntori (C)	26	15	9	2	45	22	+23	39	Qualification for the European Cup first round
2	Dinamo Tirana	26	13	7	6	42	22	+20	33	Qualification for the UEFA Cup first round
3	Vllaznia	26	13	3	10	33	23	+10	29	
4	Partizani	26	12	5	9	26	19	+7	29	
5	Flamurtari	26	8	11	7	22	20	+2	27	Qualification for the Cup Winners' Cup first round
6	Tomori	26	9	9	8	20	23	−3	27	
7	Luftëtari	26	8	10	8	24	24	0	26	
8	Traktori	26	7	10	9	15	28	−13	24	
9	Besëlidhja	26	8	8	10	18	32	−14	24	
10	Lokomotiva Durrës	26	7	9	10	25	26	−1	23	
11	Labinoti	26	7	9	10	28	32	−4	23	
12	Naftëtari	26	6	11	9	23	29	−6	23	
13	Besa (R)	26	7	8	11	28	32	−4	22	Relegation to the 1985–86 Kategoria e Dytë
14	Skënderbeu (R)	26	3	9	14	15	32	−17	15	Relegation to the 1985–86 Kategoria e Dytë

Source: RSSSF.org
(C) Champions; (R) Relegated

Note: '17 Nëntori' is Tirana, 'Traktori' is Lushnja, 'Lokomotiva Durrës' is Teuta, 'Labinoti' is Elbasani

== Results ==
Home \ Away	17N	BES	BSL	DIN	FLA	LAB	LOK	LUF	NAF	PAR	SKË	TOM	TRA	VLL
17 Nëntori		3–1	0–0	1–0	0–0	4–2	5–2	1–0	2–2	1–1	1–1	3–1	3–0	1–0
Besa	1–1		4–0	1–3	0–2	2–2	1–0	3–1	1–1	0–1	2–2	1–0	0–0	4–1
Besëlidhja	0–3	2–0		1–0	0–0	1–2	1–5	1–0	1–0	1–1	1–1	1–0	1–0	0–0
Dinamo	3–2	2–1	3–1		3–3	3–0	2–0	3–0	3–0	0–1	1–0	0–0	7–1	2–1
Flamurtari	1–1	1–1	1–0	0–0		4–1	0–0	2–0	1–0	0–1	0–0	1–1	2–0	1–0
Labinoti	2–2	2–0	0–0	1–1	2–1		3–0	0–0	1–1	1–0	2–2	3–0	2–0	0–0
Lokomotiva	1–0	0–0	2–0	1–1	0–0	1–0		0–1	0–0	1–0	5–2	1–1	0–0	3–0
Luftëtari	1–1	2–1	1–0	1–1	1–0	1–1	1–1		4–0	1–0	1–0	0–1	0–0	2–0
Naftëtari	1–2	0–0	2–0	1–0	3–1	2–0	0–0	1–1		1–0	2–0	0–0	1–1	1–1
Partizani	1–2	1–1	3–0	0–1	2–0	2–1	2–1	1–0	2–0		1–0	3–0	2–1	0–1
Skënderbeu	0–1	0–1	1–2	0–1	0–1	0–0	1–0	2–2	2–1	0–0		1–0	0–1	0–1
Tomori	1–2	2–1	1–1	1–1	0–0	1–0	2–1	1–1	2–1	2–0	1–0		0–0	1–0
Traktori	0–2	1–0	0–0	1–0	1–0	2–1	1–0	1–1	2–2	1–1	0–0	1–0		0–2
Vllaznia	0–1	3–1	2–3	3–1	3–0	2–0	2–0	2–1	2–0	2–0	4–0	0–1	1–0	

Source: CalcioMondialeWeb.it
Legend: Blue = home team win; Yellow = draw; Red = away team win.

== Season statistics ==
=== Top scorers ===
Rank	Player	Club	Goals
1	(Albania) Faslli Fakja	Vllaznia	13
1	(Albania) Arben Minga	17 Nëntori	13
3	(Albania) Agustin Kola	17 Nëntori	10
