= Luan Vukatana =

Albanian footballer

Personal information
- Full name: Luan Vukatana
- Date of birth: 13 January 1959 (age 67)
- Place of birth: Shkodër, Albania
- Position: Midfielder

Senior career*
Years	Team	Apps	(Gls)
1975–1989	Vllaznia		

International career^{‡}
1982-1983	Albania	8	(0)
- * Club domestic league appearances and goals ‡ National team caps and goals as of 8 December 2019

Luan Vukatana (born 13 January 1959) is an Albanian retired football midfielder.

== Club career ==
Vukatana joined the senior team of Vllaznia Shkodër at age 16 and won 2 league titles and three domestic cups with the club. With Roland Luçi, he scored a "passed penalty" goal in a 1981 Albanian Cup trashing of KS Pogradeci. In 2009, Vukatana was chosen in a best ever Vllaznia XI in the history of the club.

== International career ==
He made his debut for Albania in a September 1982 European Championship qualification match away against Austria and earned a total of 8 caps, scoring no goals. His final international was another European Championship qualification match, in November 1983 against West Germany.

== Honours ==
- Albanian Superliga: 2

1978, 1983

- Albanian Cup: 3

1979, 1981, 1987
