= 1966–67 Albanian National Championship =

Albanian National Championship
- Season: 1966–67
- Champions: Dinamo Tirana; 8th Albanian title
- Relegated: None
- European Cup: Dinamo Tirana
- Cup Winners' Cup: None
- Matches: 132
- Goals: 304 (2.3 per match)
- Top goalscorer: Medin Zhega (19 goals)

The 1966–67 Albanian National Championship was the 29th season of the Albanian National Championship, the top professional league for association football clubs, since its establishment in 1930.

== Overview ==
It was contested by 12 teams, and Dinamo Tirana won the championship.

== League table ==
Pos	Team	Pld	W	D	L	GF	GA	GR	Pts	Qualification
1	Dinamo Tirana (C)	22	17	4	1	59	19	3.105	38	Qualification for the European Cup first round
2	17 Nëntori	19	15	3	1	42	14	3.000	33	Disqualified (Note: Officially 17 Nëntori had 1 loss and Partizani 3, due both teams were kicked out, points were awarded to teams that should play against them. After 19th week match 17 Nëntori - Partizani 2:1, both teams were expelled from the tournament, forfeiting the match and the last 3 matches by 0:3.)
3	Besa	22	9	8	5	23	15	1.533	26	
4	Skënderbeu	22	9	7	6	24	13	1.846	25	
5	Partizani	19	9	7	3	36	18	2.000	25	Disqualified
6	Vllaznia	22	10	5	7	33	29	1.138	25	Qualification for the Balkans Cup
7	Tomori	22	7	5	10	20	27	0.741	19	
8	Labinoti	22	6	5	11	18	30	0.600	17	
9	Lokomotiva Durrës	22	3	10	9	13	24	0.542	16	
10	Traktori	22	4	8	10	19	34	0.559	16	
11	Flamurtari	22	2	8	12	19	38	0.500	12	
12	Luftëtari	22	2	6	14	13	46	0.283	10	

Source: RSSSF.org
Rules for classification: 1) points; 2) goal difference; 3) number of goals scored.
(C) Champions

== Results ==
Home \ Away	17N	BES	DIN	FLA	LAB	LOK	LUF	PAR	SKË	TOM	TRA	VLL
17 Nëntori		4–1	3–1	2–1	1–1	2–0	5–1	– (Note: The 17th round match between 17 Nëntori and Partizani, which originally ended 2–0, was lost by 0–3 to both teams from Albanian Football Association.)	2–1	0–3 (Note: Match awarded.)	3–0	3–2
Besa	1–1		0–1	2–1	0–0	0–0	3–0	3–0	2–0	1–0	2–1	2–1
Dinamo	2–2	2–2		4–0	3–0	2–0	3–0	3–0	2–1	7–3	9–2	3–2
Flamurtari	0–1	1–0	0–3		2–4	1–1	0–0	1–2	0–2	2–2	1–1	2–3
Labinoti	0–2	0–0	0–0	4–2		1–0	1–2	0–4	0–4	1–0	0–0	0–1
Lokomotiva	3–0	0–0	0–2	0–0	0–2		1–1	3–3	0–1	0–0	0–0	0–1
Luftëtari	0–3	0–0	2–3	0–1	0–0	1–2		1–2	0–0	2–1	2–2	1–5
Partizani	2–3	0–0	2–2	2–2	1–0	4–0	4–0		0–3	0–1	2–0	4–0
Skënderbeu	0–0	1–0	0–2	1–1	2–1	1–0	5–0	0–0		0–1	0–0	2–1
Tomori	0–2	1–1	0–2	1–0	1–0	0–1	1–0	1–1	1–0		1–3	0–1
Traktori	3–0	0–3	1–3	1–0	0–2	1–1	3–0	0–1	0–0	0–0		0–1
Vllaznia	0–2	1–3	0–0	2–2	3–0	1–1	1–0	2–2	0–0	2–1	3–1	

Source: CalcioMondialeWeb.it
Legend: Blue = home team win; Yellow = draw; Red = away team win.
