= Dodë Tahiri =

Albanian footballer

Dodë Tahira
Personal information
- Date of birth: 27 November 1918
- Place of birth: Pecaj, Principality of Albania
- Date of death: 28 May 1988 (aged 69)
- Place of death: Mladenovac, SFR Yugoslavia
- Position: Goalkeeper

Senior career*
Years	Team	Apps	(Gls)
1938–1939	Bashan Lazarevac		
1939–1941	Šumadija Aranđelovac		
1945–1946	Vllaznia		
1946–1948	Budućnost Titograd		
1948–1953	Šumadija Aranđelovac		

International career
1946	Albania	3	(0)

Managerial career
- –1956: 19 Shtatori
- Jedinstvo
- OFK Mladenovac
- 1961–1962: Šumadija
- 1964: Šumadija
- * Club domestic league appearances and goals

Dodë Tahiri (27 November 1918 – 28 May 1988) was an Albanian international football player. He was the goalkeeper in Albania's first ever international match against Yugoslavia in 1946.

Dodë Tahiri was also known for his heroic Acts in Germany, executing 2 German soldiers whom allegedly killed Lush Prela ( Bajraktar of Shala Region)

== Club career ==
Born in Pecaj, Dukagjin highlands, Tahiri came to Lazarevac, Serbia, in 1938 to play for Bashan. Named after his place of birth, he played in Serbia as Doda Pecović. He later played for FK Šumadija Aranđelovac in Serbia during the 1930s and 1950s. At the end of the Second World War he played with Vllaznia Shkodër in Albania winning two league titles. Then he played with FK Budućnost Titograd in the 1946–47 and 1948–49 Yugoslav First League.

== International career ==
He made a total of 3 appearances for the Albania national team in 1946 in Tirana within the 1946 Balkan Cup, the first against Yugoslavia (2–3 defeat) and the second against Bulgaria (3–1 win).

== Honours ==
- Albanian Superliga: 2

1945, 1946
