= Riza Lushta =

Kosovar Albanian footballer (1916–1997)

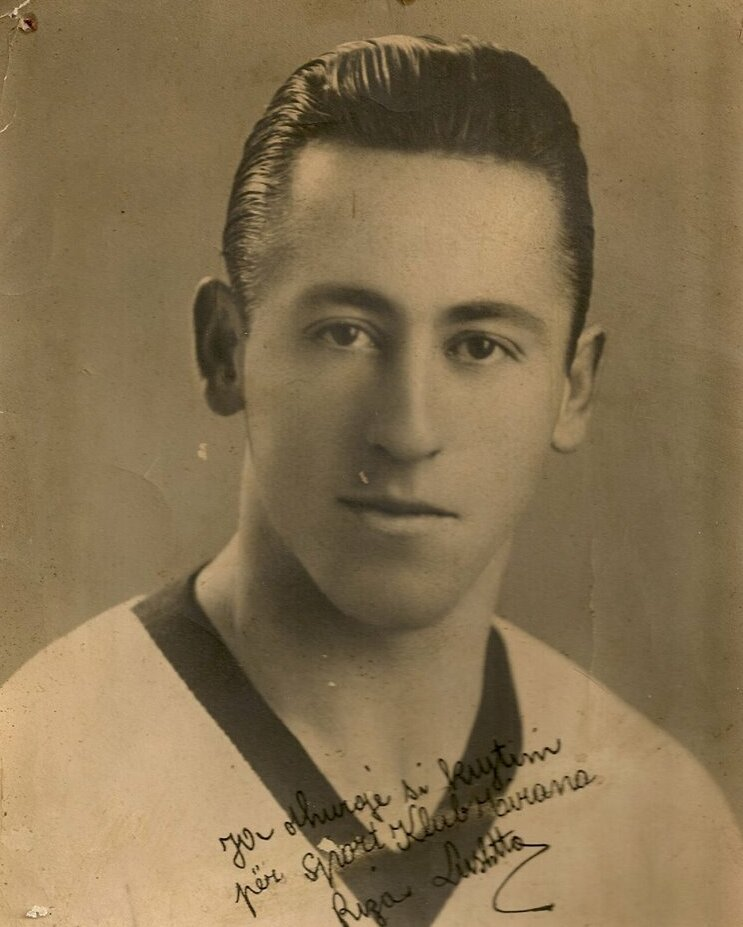
- Lushta with Tirana in the 1930s

Personal information
- Full name: Riza Lushta
- Date of birth: 22 January 1916
- Place of birth: Mitrovica, Kingdom of Serbia
- Date of death: 6 February 1997 (aged 81)
- Place of death: Turin, Italy
- Height: 1.72 m (5 ft 8 in)
- Position: Centre-forward

Youth career
- 1932–1934: Trepça

Senior career*
Years	Team	Apps	(Gls)
1934–1939	Tirana	69	(39)
1939–1940	Bari	16	(3)
1940–1945	Juventus	85	(46)
1945–1946	Napoli	27	(6)
1946–1948	Alessandria	57	(17)
1948–1951	Cannes	27	(3)
1951–1952	Siena	27	(4)
1952–1953	Forlì	21	
1953–1954	Rapallo Ruentes	22	
Total		351	(118)

International career
1936–1946	Albania	?	(?)
- * Club domestic league appearances and goals

Riza Lushta (22 January 1916 – 6 February 1997) was a Kosovar Albanian footballer who played as a striker.

== Career ==
=== Youth career and early seasons ===
Lushta was born on 22 January 1916 in Mitrovica, Kingdom of Serbia (now Kosovo). It was in his hometown that he would begin to play football with the local club KF Trepça, where he quickly established himself as one of the most effective strikers the city and even region had ever seen. After spending with KF Trepça Lushta two years left Kosovo in 1934 and went to Albania to join the Harry Fultz Technical School in Tirana and in that time he joined two time Albanian champions SK Tirana. His career with Tirana immediately took off, winning the league title in his first season in Albania, before going on to win it a total of four times between 1934 and 1939, as well as the inaugural King's Cup in 1939. He left Albania and SK Tirana in 1939 following the Italian occupation of Albania to join Bari in Italy, where he scored 3 times in 16 games during his first season in Italy.

=== Years in Serie A and Ligue 1 ===
His performances with Bari attracted the interest of Juventus who he joined in 1940 after just one year with Bari. In his first season with Juventus he scored 9 times in 26 games before netting 15 goals the following season to be named the highest scoring foreigner of the 1941–42 Serie A.

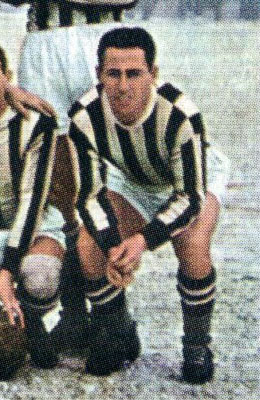
Lushta with Juventus in the 1940–41 season

Lushtas entered the parlor and football Serie A was done in red and white sweater Baris where Lushta in his first season scored three times in 19 matches. As results may seem, but sufficiently startling to giants Juventus would bite on attracting over Albanian to the old lady. Back home staid in Turin and Juventus so exploded Lushta. In 26 games, he made nine goals the first season, of which he uppföljde this with the network 16 times in 28 matches for the season, of which he was the same year took a cuptitel with Juventus at a merit of Lushta yourself. The final was against AC Milan, match result ended 4–2 to Juventus which Lushta went into a hat-trick against Milan. Total goals in the Cup that season landed on eight goals in six games. 24 goals in 34 games in total during the same year, of which a hat-trick on himself Milan in the final shot up the name Lushta to the skies in both Italy and the continent. A follow next year with 18 goals in 28 matches completed only the celebration of Lushta. In his last year at Juventus (1944), Lushta played only 5 games, after making just as many goals in the opening games Napoli chose to release Albanian. How and why Juventus went along with this is still a major mystery among many puzzled supporters of both Juventus and football journalists. The same season successful Lushta went into another seven pods for Napoli before Italy capitulated and Lushta chose to seek his fortune on the western front. This time in the French league and the club AS Cannes, a short spell that Lushta ended when he got the offer to return to Italy and Alessandria, where he rounded off a new season with 17 goals before he finished his pro career with AC Siena.

=== Last years ===
He chose for this to unwind in the slightly smaller clubs Forlì and Rapallo Ruentes in Italy before ending his football career in 1954 at 38 years old. In the national team so the rumor is that Lushta played 35 games for Albania whom he scored 30 times. A total of superior hindsight against today's players, with the exception that contemporary games in almost 100% of cases were unofficial matches and Lushtas any record thus not officially today.

Lushta died in February 1997 in Torino at 81 years. It was rumored that Lushta for much of his adult life lived alone in Torino with no close family or very many friends. He was buried in the same city, the city where his name once echoed across the Olimpico. He is still today the Albanian who made the absolute most goals in the major leagues in Europe, and was also one of the largest during his time in Europe. Overall, he played 170 matches in Serie A, scoring 68 goals; with Juventus, he played the Italian War Tournament 1943-44 (5 matches and 5 goal scored). He never made an official appearance for the Albania national football team.

== Legacy ==
In Mitrovica, his birthplace, a stadium currently bears his name.

== Honours ==
- Kategoria Superiore: 4

1934, 1936, 1937, 1939

- Albanian Cup: 1

1938–39

- Coppa Italia: 1

1941–42
