= Zmijani =

Zmijani is an Albanian surname. Notable people with the surname include:

- Hysen Zmijani (born 1963), Albanian footballer
- Luan Zmijani (born 1976), Albanian footballer and manager
