= 1956 Albanian National Championship =

Albanian National Championship
- Season: 1956
- Champions: Dinamo Tirana

The 1956 Albanian National Championship was the nineteenth season of the Albanian National Championship, the top professional league for association football clubs, since its establishment in 1930.

== Overview ==
It was contested by 9 teams, and Dinamo Tirana won the championship.

== League standings ==
Pos	Team	Pld	W	D	L	GF	GA	GR	Pts	Qualification or relegation
1	Dinamo Tirana (C)	16	13	3	0	35	8	4.375	29	Champions
2	Partizani	16	10	3	3	37	10	3.700	23	
3	Puna Tiranë	16	7	3	6	24	19	1.263	17	
4	Puna Vlorë	16	6	4	6	21	20	1.050	16	
5	Puna Korçë	16	6	3	7	20	33	0.606	15	
6	Puna Durrës	16	6	1	9	12	23	0.522	13	
7	Puna Kavajë	16	4	4	8	21	30	0.700	12	
8	Puna Shkodër (R)	16	4	4	8	12	19	0.632	12	Relegation to the 1957 Kategoria e Dytë
9	Puna Berat (R)	16	3	1	12	11	31	0.355	7	Relegation to the 1957 Kategoria e Dytë

Source: RSSSF.org
(C) Champions; (R) Relegated

== Results ==
Home \ Away	DIN	PAR	BER	DUR	KAV	KOR	SHK	TIR	VLO
Dinamo		2–2	2–0	3–0	2–0	4–1	2–0	2–0	2–0
Partizani	0–0		4–0	0–1	4–0	5–0	4–0	2–0	3–0
Puna Berat	2–4	1–3		1–0	0–0	1–2	1–0	1–0	1–2
Puna Durrës	0–2	3–2	1–0		2–1	0–0	2–1	0–1	2–1
Puna Kavajë	0–2	0–3	3–1	3–1		4–0	0–0	2–4	1–0
Puna Korçë	1–3	1–3	2–0	2–0	5–3		1–0	3–1	1–1
Puna Shkodër	0–1	1–0	2–0	2–0	1–1	1–1		1–1	1–0
Puna Tiranë	0–0	1–2	3–1	2–0	2–1	5–0	2–1		1–1
Puna Vlorë	2–3	0–0	3–1	2–0	2–2	2–0	3–1	2–1	

Source: CalcioMondialeWeb.it
Legend: Blue = home team win; Yellow = draw; Red = away team win.
