= Faslli Fakja =

Albanian footballer

Personal information
- Full name: Faslli Fakja
- Place of birth: Shkodër, PSR Albania
- Position: Striker

Senior career*
Years	Team	Apps	(Gls)
198x–199x	Vllaznia		

International career
1983	Albania U18	1	(0)
1984–1985	Albania U21	4	(1)
- * Club domestic league appearances and goals

Faslli Fakja is a former Albanian football who played for Vllaznia Shkodër in the 1980s, where he was part of the 1982–83 National Championship winning team playing alongside international players Ferid Rragami and Fatbardh Jera.

He was also joint top goalscorer in the league for the 1984–85 season alongside Arben Minga.

== Honours ==
- Albanian Superliga: 1

1983
