= 1964–65 Albanian National Championship =

Albanian National Championship
- Season: 1964–65
- Champions: 17 Nëntori; 8th Albanian title
- Relegated: Ylli i Kuq
- European Cup: 17 Nëntori
- Cup Winners' Cup: None
- Matches: 132
- Goals: 307 (2.33 per match)
- Top goalscorer: Robert Jashari (14 goals)

The 1964–65 Albanian National Championship was the 27th season of the Albanian National Championship since its establishment in 1930.

== Overview ==
It was contested by 12 teams, and 17 Nëntori won the championship.

== League table ==
Pos	Team	Pld	W	D	L	GF	GA	GR	Pts	Qualification or relegation
1	17 Nëntori (C)	22	13	5	4	42	20	2.100	31	Qualification for the European Cup first round
2	Partizani	22	11	8	3	31	15	2.067	30	Qualification for the Balkans Cup
3	Dinamo Tirana	22	12	6	4	36	21	1.714	30	
4	Besa	22	12	5	5	33	21	1.571	29	
5	Lokomotiva Durrës	22	12	4	6	24	14	1.714	28	
6	Flamurtari	22	6	9	7	27	25	1.080	21	
7	Traktori	22	5	9	8	27	29	0.931	19	
8	Vllaznia	22	8	3	11	27	31	0.871	19	
9	Tomori	22	6	7	9	18	26	0.692	19	
10	Labinoti	22	6	7	9	20	31	0.645	19	
11	Skënderbeu (O)	22	4	9	9	16	29	0.552	17	Qualification for the relegation play-offs
12	Ylli i Kuq (R)	22	0	2	20	6	45	0.133	2	Relegation to the 1965–66 Kategoria e Dytë

Source: RSSSF.org
Rules for classification: 1) points; 2) goal difference; 3) number of goals scored.
(C) Champions; (O) Play-off winners; (R) Relegated

Note: '17 Nëntori' is Tirana, 'Lokomotiva Durrës' is Teuta, 'Traktori' is Lushnja, 'Labinoti' is Elbasani, 'Ylli i Kuq' is Pogradeci

== Results ==
Home \ Away	17N	BES	DIN	FLA	LAB	LOK	PAR	SKË	TOM	TRA	VLL	YIK
17 Nëntori		2–0	2–1	2–0	2–0	0–0	0–2	5–1	5–0	4–2	4–2	2–0
Besa	2–2		2–2	3–0	3–1	0–0	1–0	4–0	1–0	3–1	2–1	3–1
Dinamo	1–2	2–0		1–1	3–0	1–0	2–1	1–1	2–1	2–0	4–2	3–1
Flamurtari	0–1	3–1	1–0		1–0	0–1	0–0	4–2	1–1	2–2	0–0	6–2
Labinoti	0–0	2–1	2–2	1–1		1–1	1–1	1–0	0–0	1–1	3–2	2–0
Lokomotiva	1–0	2–0	2–3	2–1	1–0		2–1	1–0	1–0	2–1	1–0	4–0
Partizani	1–0	1–1	1–1	0–0	5–1	2–1		2–0	3–1	1–0	3–0	1–0
Skënderbeu	3–3	0–0	1–0	1–1	0–1	1–0	1–1		2–0	1–1	1–1	1–0
Tomori	1–2	0–1	1–1	1–0	2–1	1–0	0–0	0–0		1–1	3–2	2–0
Traktori	1–1	1–2	0–1	2–2	3–1	2–1	1–1	2–0	1–1		1–1	3–0
Vllaznia	2–1	0–1	0–1	2–1	2–0	0–1	1–2	1–0	2–1	1–0		3–1
Ylli i Kuq	0–2	0–2	0–2	0–2	0–1	0–0	1–2	0–0	0–1	0–1	0–2	

Source: CalcioMondialeWeb.it
Legend: Blue = home team win; Yellow = draw; Red = away team win.

== Relegation/promotion playoff ==
Team 1	Agg.	Team 2	1st leg	2nd leg
Skënderbeu	11–3	Naftëtari	6–0	5–3
