= 1978–79 Albanian Cup =

Kupa e Shqipërisë

Tournament details
- Country: Albania

Final positions
- Champions: Vllaznia
- Runners-up: Dinamo Tirana

1978–79 Albanian Cup (Albanian: Kupa e Shqipërisë) was the twenty-seventh season of Albania's annual cup competition. It began in August 1978 with the First Round and ended in May 1979 with the Final matches. The winners of the competition qualified for the 1979-80 first round of the UEFA Cup. Dinamo Tirana were the defending champions, having won their ninth Albanian Cup last season. The cup was won by Vllaznia.

The rounds were played in a two-legged format similar to those of European competitions. If the aggregated score was tied after both games, the team with the higher number of away goals advanced. If the number of away goals was equal in both games, the match was decided by extra time and a penalty shootout, if necessary.

== First round ==
Games were played on August & September 1978*

- Results unknown

== Second round ==
In this round entered the 16 winners from the previous round. First and second legs were played in January 1979.

Team 1	Agg.	Team 2	1st leg	2nd leg
Partizani	5–2	Flamurtari	3–1	2–1
17 Nëntori	3–1	Besa	2–1	1–0
Labinoti	4–1	Sopoti	3–0	1–1
Tomori	2–4	Dinamo Tirana	2–2	0–2
Naftëtari	5–4	Shkëndija Tirana	4–0	1–4
Besëlidhja	1–2	Lokomotiva Durrës	1–1	0–1
Traktori	5–2	Minatori Tepelena	5–1	0–1
Vllaznia	1–0	Luftëtari	0–0	1–0

== Quarter-finals ==
In this round entered the 8 winners from the previous round.

Team 1	Agg.	Team 2	1st leg	2nd leg
17 Nëntori	2–3	Dinamo Tirana	1–0	1–3
Partizani	3–0	Labinoti	1–0	2–0
Vllaznia	5–3	Naftëtari	3–2	2–1
Traktori	2–2 (2–3 p)	Lokomotiva Durrës	1–1	1–1

== Semi-finals ==
In this round entered the four winners from the previous round.

Team 1	Agg.	Team 2	1st leg	2nd leg
Dinamo Tirana	3–1	Partizani	2–1	1–0
Vllaznia	3–2	Lokomotiva Durrës	2–1	1–1

== Finals ==
In this round entered the two winners from the previous round.

Team 1	Agg.	Team 2	1st leg	2nd leg
Dinamo Tirana	2–3	Vllaznia	1–1	1–2

=== First leg ===
11 February 1979

Dinamo Tirana	1–1	Vllaznia
Delia 73'		Vukatana 34'

Qemal Stafa Stadium, Tirana
Referee: K. Peqini

=== Second leg ===
18 February 1979

Vllaznia	2–1 (a.e.t.)	Dinamo Tirana
Zhega 100'; Vukatana 102'		Ballgjini 120+4'

Vojo Kushi Stadium, Shkodër
Attendance: 15,000
Referee: Y. Kruja
