= 1950 Albanian National Championship =

Albanian National Championship
- Season: 1950
- Champions: Dinamo Tirana

The 1950 Albanian National Championship was the thirteenth season of the Albanian National Championship, the top professional league for association football clubs, since its establishment in 1930.

== Overview ==
It was contested by 12 teams, and Dinamo Tirana won the championship.

== League standings ==
Pos	Team	Pld	W	D	L	GF	GA	GR	Pts	Qualification or relegation
1	Dinamo Tirana (C)	16	14	1	1	60	6	10.000	29	Champions
2	Partizani	16	14	1	1	77	10	7.700	29	
3	Shkodra	16	11	1	4	45	18	2.500	23	
4	Kavaja	16	6	3	7	21	32	0.656	15	
5	Lezha (R)	16	5	3	8	20	26	0.769	13	Relegation to the 1951 Kategoria e Dytë (Note: Lezha were demoted to the lower league for unknown reasons.)
6	Vlora	16	5	3	8	20	38	0.526	13	
7	Korça	16	8	3	5	31	24	1.292	19	
8	Durrësi	16	6	3	7	24	31	0.774	15	
9	Tirana	16	6	2	8	34	24	1.417	14	
10	Elbasani	16	5	3	8	18	28	0.643	13	
11	Fieri	16	4	1	11	25	45	0.556	9	
12	Spartak Pogradeci (R)	16	0	0	16	6	99	0.061	0	Relegation to the 1951 Kategoria e Dytë

Source: RSSSF.org
Rules for classification: After 1st round, 6 first ranked teams played with each other and the same for the other 6.
(C) Champions; (R) Relegated
Notes:

Note: 'Shkodra' is Vllaznia, 'Kavaja' is Besa, 'Lezha' is Besëlidhja, 'Vlora' is Flamurtari, 'Korça' is Skënderbeu, 'Durrësi' is Teuta, 'Tirana' is SK Tirana, 'Fieri' is Apolonia and 'Spartak Pogradeci' is Pogradeci

== Results ==
=== First round ===
Home \ Away	DIN	DUR	ELB	FIE	KAV	KOR	LEZ	PAR	SPA	SHK	TIR	VLO
Dinamo Tirana		5–0		7–0		3–0	3–0	1–0				4–1
Durrësi			4–0		1–1			1–4			2–1	1–1
Elbasani	0–2					2–2	1–0	0–5		1–4		
Fieri		1–2	2–0		1–2	1–2			8–1		2–1	
Kavaja	3–2		2–0				2–0		4–1		0–0	
Korça		3–1			2–1		1–1		3–0	1–2		
Lezha		2–1		2–0				0–3		2–2	1–1	2–0
Partizani				8–1	3–1	8–1			10–0	3–1		7–1
Spartak Pogradeci	0–11	0–2	2–4				0–6					2–3
Shkodra	0–1	5–0		6–0	2–0				10–0			2–0
Tirana	0–1		0–1			3–1		0–6	9–2	0–1		
Vlora			1–1	2–0	1–1	2–1					4–1	

Source: CalcioMondialeWeb.it
Legend: Blue = home team win; Yellow = draw; Red = away team win.

=== Second round ===
==== Top 6 ====
Home \ Away	DIN	KAV	LEZ	PAR	SHK	VLO
Dinamo Tirana		6–0			4–1	
Kavaja				0–7	1–3	2–0
Lezha	0–4	3–1				
Partizani	1–1		3–1			6–0
Shkodra			2–0	1–3		
Vlora	0–5		2–0		2–3	

Source: CalcioMondialeWeb.it
Legend: Blue = home team win; Yellow = draw; Red = away team win.

==== Bottom 6 ====
Home \ Away	DUR	ELB	FIE	KOR	SPA	TIR
Durrësi		1–3		0–0	4–0	
Elbasani			1–1		4–0	0–2
Fieri	1–3				6–0	
Korça		2–0	4–0			1–0
Spartak Pogradeci				0–7		0–8
Tirana	4–1		4–1			

Source: CalcioMondialeWeb.it
Legend: Blue = home team win; Yellow = draw; Red = away team win.
