= 1972–73 Kategoria e Dytë =

Kategoria e Dytë
- Season: 1972–73
- Champions: Naftëtari
- Promoted: Naftëtari
- Relegated: Gramozi (withdraw); Shkumbini (withdraw); 24 Maji; Valbona (withdraw); Studenti

The 1972–73 Kategoria e Dytë was the 27th season of a second-tier association football league in Albania.

== Group A ==
1. Naftëtari (qualified to the championship playoffs)
2. Ylli i Kuq
3. Tomori
4. Punëtori
5. Gramozi (withdraw; relegated to the 1973–74 Kategoria e Tretë)
6. 5 Shtatori
7. Adriatiku Nartë
8. 22 Tetori
9. Shkumbini (withdraw; relegated to the 1973–74 Kategoria e Tretë)
10. Bistrica
11. Minatori (T)
12. 24 Maji (relegated to the 1973–74 Kategoria e Tretë)

== Group B ==
1. Dajti (qualified to the championship playoffs)
2. Tekstilisti Stalin
3. Erzeni
4. Korabi
5. Përparimi
6. Sopoti
7. 31 Korriku
8. 10 Korriku
9. Tërbuni
10. Valbona (withdraw; relegated to the 1973–74 Kategoria e Tretë)
11. Minatori (Rr)
12. Studenti (relegated to the 1973–74 Kategoria e Tretë)

== Championship/promotion playoff ==
Team 1	Score	Team 2
Naftëtari	2–1 (a.e.t.)	Dajti

- Naftëtari was promoted to 1973–74 National Championship.
