= Derviš Hadžiosmanović =

Montenegrin footballer and coach

Personal information
- Full name: Derviš Hadžiosmanović
- Date of birth: 9 August 1958 (age 68)
- Place of birth: Pljevlja, FPR Yugoslavia
- Position: Midfielder

Youth career
- Rudar Pljevlja

Senior career*
| Years | Team | Apps | (Gls) |
| 197x–1978 | Rudar Pljevlja | | |
| 1978–1985 | Budućnost Titograd | 91 | (9) |
| 1979–1980 | → OFK Titograd (loan) | 14 | (1) |
| 1985–1986 | Čelik Zenica | 30 | (3) |
| 1988–1989 | Novi Pazar | 16 | (1) |
| 1989–1991 | Iskra Bugojno | 39 | (13) |
| 1991–199x | Rudar Pljevlja | | |
| 199x–199x | Belasica | | |

Managerial career
- 199x–199x: Belasica
- 2000–2001: Vllaznia
- 2003–2004: Vllaznia
- 2004–2005: Erzeni Shijak (Futsal)
- 2005: Vllaznia
- 2008: Vllaznia
- 2008: Kastrioti
- 2009: Vllaznia
- 2011: Tërbuni
- 2011–2014: Otrant Ulcinj
- 2014: Vllaznia
- 2015–2019: Montenegro women
- 2015–2018: Montenegro U-17
- 2016–2018: Montenegro U-19
- 2019: Mornar
- 2020–2021: Grbalj
- 2021–2022: Mladost Donja Gorica
- 2022: Deçiç Tuzi
- 2024: Arsenal Tivat
- 2025–: Basania
- * Club domestic league appearances and goals

Derviš Hadžiosmanović (Cyrillic: Дервиш Хаџиосмановић, Albanian: Dervish Haxhiosmani; born 9 August 1958) is a Montenegrin football coach and former player.

== Playing career ==
=== Club ===
Born in Pljevlja, SR Montenegro, back then within Yugoslavia, he played as midfielder in the Yugoslav First League with FK Budućnost Titograd, and with Yugoslav Second League sides OFK Titograd, NK Čelik Zenica, FK Novi Pazar and NK Iskra Bugojno.

By September 2016, he was listed among the few former players considered legends of FK Rudar Pljevlja by club's official website. He started and finished his playing career at his home-town club Rudar. Before retiring he had a memorable season in which he, along Damir Čakar and Dragan Aničić formed a superb trio that drove Rudar to the promotion to the Second League of FR Yugoslavia.

== Managerial career ==
As a manager, he spent over a decade managing clubs in Albania, most notably Vllaznia Shkodër. In February 2019, he was in charge of FK Mornar for only three days.
