= Luan Zmijani =

Albanian footballer and manager

Personal information
- Full name: Luan Zmijani
- Date of birth: 19 June 1976 (age 50)
- Place of birth: Shkodër, PSR Albania
- Height: 1.86 m (6 ft 1 in)
- Position: Defender

Team information
- Current team: Vllaznia (U-19 manager)

Senior career*
Years	Team	Apps	(Gls)
1993–2001	Vllaznia	167	(7)
2001–2002	Partizani	15	(0)
2002	Besëlidhja	2	(0)
2003–2004	Vllaznia	44	(0)
2004–2005	Egnatia	9	(0)
Total		237	(7)

International career
1996–1997	Albania U21	7	(0)
2002	Albania	2	(0)

Managerial career
- 2015: Vllaznia
- 2017–: Vllaznia (U-19)
- * Club domestic league appearances and goals

Luan Zmijani (born 19 June 1976) is an Albanian football coach and former player, who is the current manager of the Under-19 squad of Vllaznia Shkodër.

== Playing career ==
=== International ===
He made his debut for Albania in a January 2002 Bahrain International Tournament match against Finland and earned a total of 2 caps, scoring no goals. His other international was during the same tournament against the hosts.

== Managerial career ==
In August 2017, Zmijani was appointed manager of the Vllaznia U-19 team.

== Honours ==
- Albanian Superliga: 2

1998, 2001
