= Palokë Nika =

Albanian athlete, sports events organizer, footballer, referee, and sports journalist

Palokë Nikaj (1892–1961) was a 20th-century Albanian athlete, sports events organizer, footballer, referee, and sports journalist. His pioneering activities in sports made him one of the most notable figures in organized sports in Albania. He is recognized as one of the most important initiators of the creation of KF Vllaznia Shkodër, but he also helped create KF Tirana, by being its first coach.

== Life ==
Palokë Nika was born in 1892 in Gimaj, Shalë. In 1908, while pursuing a secondary college, he played at a local team in Piedmont, Italy. Later, he became the captain of Indipendenca Shkodër, a local football team, located in Shkodër, Albania. In spring 1913, Indipendenca Shkodër played an unusual game against a selection of footballers of the Austro-Hungarian Imperial Navy, which at that time was in Albania, in order to guarantee the borders of the newly created country. In 1919, Nika was one of the founders of KF Vllaznia Shkodër of which he was also captain and coach.

In 1920, after having helped create the newly formed KF Tirana, which he also coached, he initiated a friendly match between KF Tirana and Juventus Shkodër, which was a selection of players from Bashkimi Shkodran, later to be known as KF Vllaznia Shkodër.

On June 13, 1920, Nika organized and won first place in the first public running competition of a 4200m distance in Shkodër, where 25 runners participated. One month later, on July 4, 1920, Luigj Gurakuqi organized again in Shkodër another public race, of 8 km distance, which was won by Nika.

In 1923 Nika won a mini-marathon of 16 km in Tirana.

Nika organized in May 1920 the first biking event in Albania, a Shkodër-Koplik and return. In August 1920 he organized another race, Shkodër-Tirana. In 1925 he organized the first biking national tour for amateurs in Europe, a race of 1,000 km that would go through 14 Albanian cities. The race involved 25 bike runners. Nika was the main referee of the tour, besides being its sports director. The second tour of Albania occurred in 1936, and its sports director was again Nika.

Nika was also a journalist. He published Gazeta e Sportit during 1925 and 1926.

== Legacy ==
The municipality of Shkodër awards the "Paloke Nika Prize" to individuals (athletes and coaches) who leave a rich legacy in sports, while a street in his native city bears his name.
