= 1951 Albanian National Championship =

Albanian National Championship
- Season: 1951
- Champions: Dinamo Tirana

The 1951 Albanian National Championship was the fourteenth season of the Albanian National Championship, the top professional league for association football clubs, since its establishment in 1930.

== Overview ==
It was contested by 14 teams, and Dinamo Tirana won the championship.

== League standings ==
Pos	Team	Pld	W	D	L	GF	GA	GR	Pts
1	Dinamo Tirana (C)	26	24	2	0	108	7	15.429	50
2	Partizani	26	24	0	2	136	10	13.600	48
3	Puna Tiranë	26	16	3	7	61	45	1.356	35
4	Puna Shkodër	26	13	8	5	59	23	2.565	34
5	Puna Korçë	26	12	7	7	39	26	1.500	31
6	Puna Kavajë	26	14	1	11	54	38	1.421	29
7	Puna Durrës	26	10	6	10	41	55	0.745	26
8	Puna Elbasan	26	10	4	12	30	31	0.968	24
9	Puna Berat	26	9	4	13	34	60	0.567	22
10	Spartaku Shkodër	26	7	7	12	29	64	0.453	21
11	Puna Vlorë	26	6	3	17	20	59	0.339	15
12	Puna Gjirokastër	26	5	3	18	29	73	0.397	13
13	Puna Fier	26	4	3	19	18	73	0.247	11
14	Puna Qyteti Stalin	26	2	1	23	10	104	0.096	5

Source: RSSSF.org
(C) Champions

Note: From 1951 to 1957 the cities clubs were named Puna.

== Results ==
Home \ Away	DIN	PAR	BER	DUR	ELB	FIE	GJI	KAV	KOR	QYT	SHK	TIR	VLO	SPA
Dinamo Tirana		2–0	5–1	4–0	2–0	10–1	7–0	5–0	4–0	12–0	1–1	6–0	5–0	11–1
Partizani	1–3		14–0	6–0	3–0	11–0	8–0	6–0	3–0	11–0	2–0	4–0	8–0	6–0
Puna Berat	0–3	1–3		2–0	1–2	2–1	3–1	1–0	2–2	2–0	3–3	0–2	3–1	0–0
Puna Durrës	0–3	0–6	2–1		3–1	2–0	4–1	0–5	1–1	5–0	1–1	4–4	3–0	3–0
Puna Elbasan	0–1	0–2	3–1	1–2		2–0	2–0	3–0	1–0	4–0	0–0	2–2	4–0	3–1
Puna Fier	0–5	0–6	1–2	0–2	1–0		1–2	0–1	1–1	5–0	1–4	1–2	1–0	1–1
Puna Gjirokastër	0–2	0–7	0–1	0–0	1–0	7–0		2–3	0–2	7–0	0–1	0–1	3–1	2–2
Puna Kavajë	0–1	1–2	4–1	6–0	1–0	1–0	5–0		1–0	8–1	3–2	2–3	7–0	2–1
Puna Korçë	0–3	0–1	2–0	2–1	3–0	5–0	5–0	2–2		3–0	1–0	1–0	1–0	4–1
Puna Qyteti Stalin	0–2	0–9	1–1	1–3	0–1	0–1	2–0	1–3	2–3		0–2	1–4	0–2	1–0
Puna Shkodër	1–1	3–4	3–1	4–0	2–1	2–0	7–0	2–0	0–0	6–0		5–0	5–1	3–0
Puna Tiranë	1–2	0–6	3–1	3–1	3–0	3–1	7–1	2–0	0–0	6–0	2–1		2–1	6–1
Puna Vlorë	0–4	0–2	1–2	1–3	0–0	1–0	2–2	1–0	2–0	3–0	0–0	2–1		0–1
Spartaku Shkodër	0–4	0–5	3–2	2–2	3–0	1–1	2–0	2–1	1–1	1–0	1–1	2–4	2–1	

Source: CalcioMondialeWeb.it
Legend: Blue = home team win; Yellow = draw; Red = away team win.
