= 1953 Albanian National Championship =

Albanian National Championship
- Season: 1953
- Champions: Dinamo Tirana

The 1953 Albanian National Championship was the sixteenth season of the Albanian National Championship, the top professional league for association football clubs, since its establishment in 1930.

== Overview ==
It was contested by 10 teams, and Dinamo Tirana won the championship.

== League standings ==
Pos	Team	Pld	W	D	L	GF	GA	GR	Pts	Qualification
1	Dinamo Tirana (C)	18	14	2	2	41	10	4.100	30	Champions
2	Partizani	18	14	1	3	51	16	3.188	29	
3	Puna Tiranë	18	14	1	3	47	16	2.938	29	
4	Puna Shkodër	18	11	2	5	32	19	1.684	24	
5	Puna Vlorë	18	6	4	8	22	27	0.815	16	
6	Puna Durrës	18	3	8	7	13	18	0.722	14	
7	Luftëtari Sh.B.O. "Enver Hoxha"	18	5	2	11	18	27	0.667	12	
8	Puna Korçë	18	5	2	11	14	36	0.389	12	
9	Dinamo Durrësi	18	1	7	10	8	33	0.242	9	
10	Spartaku Pogradec (R)	18	1	3	14	13	57	0.228	5	Relegation to the 1954 Kategoria e Dytë

Source: RSSSF.org
(C) Champions; (R) Relegated

== Results ==
Home \ Away	DID	DIT	LUF	PAR	DUR	KOR	SHK	TIR	VLO	SPA
Dinamo Durrësi		0–1	1–1	1–5	1–1	1–0	0–0	0–3	0–0	1–1
Dinamo Tirana	3–0		2–0	1–0	1–0	5–0	2–0	3–0	4–0	6–0
Luftëtari "Enver Hoxha"	1–0	1–2		0–2	0–0	1–0	1–2	0–1	3–1	4–0
Partizani	6–0	3–1	5–2		2–0	6–1	3–0	1–0	2–1	5–0
Puna Durrës	0–0	1–1	1–0	1–1		3–0	0–1	1–2	1–1	3–1
Puna Korçë	1–1	0–0	1–0	0–1	1–0		0–1	0–1	1–0	6–2
Puna Shkodër	3–2	0–2	3–2	3–1	1–0	4–0		1–1	4–1	4–0
Puna Tiranë	5–0	4–2	2–0	1–2	5–1	3–0	2–1		3–0	8–1
Puna Vlorë	1–0	0–2	3–0	3–2	0–0	6–1	2–1	1–2		1–1
Spartaku Pogradec	1–0	1–3	1–2	1–4	0–0	1–2	0–3	2–4	0–1	

Source: CalcioMondialeWeb.it
Legend: Blue = home team win; Yellow = draw; Red = away team win.
