= 1939 Albanian National Championship =

Albanian National Championship
- Season: 1939
- Champions: KF Tirana

Statistics of Albanian National Championship in the 1939 season. This event is still not officially recognized from AFA, but in December 2012 the Albanian sports media have reported that this championship, along with the other two championships of World War II is expected to be recognized soon.

== Overview ==
1939 Albanian National Championship was the 8th season of Albania's annual main competition. It started on 1 July 1939, and ended on 30 September 1939. Eight teams were separated in two groups of 4 teams each, playing two leg matches with a knock-out system. Group A teams were: SK Tirana, Rinia Korçare, Bashkimi Elbasanas and Dragoj. Group B teams were: Vllaznia, Besa, Teuta and Ismail Qemali.

KF Tirana won the championship.

== Results ==
=== First round ===
In this round entered all the teams in two groups.

Group A:

Team 1	Agg.	Team 2	1st leg	2nd leg
SK Tirana	9-0	Dragoj	7-0	2-0
Bashkimi Elbasanas	4-8	Rinia Korçare	1-6	3-2

Group B:

Team 1	Agg.	Team 2	1st leg	2nd leg
Ismail Qemali	2-4	Teuta	1-1	1-3
Vllaznia	7-4	Besa	4-0	3-4

=== Semifinals ===
In this round entered the four winners from the previous round.

Team 1	Score	Team 2
SK Tirana	3-0	Rinia Korçare
Teuta	1-4	Vllaznia

=== Finals ===
In this round entered the two winners from the previous round.

Team 1	Score	Team 2
SK Tirana	6-5	Vllaznia

- Teams, scorers and referee:

SK Tirana: Gurashi I; Maluçi, Janku; Myzeqari, F.Hoxha, Karapici; Kryeziu, Lisi, Korça, Lushta, Plluska.

Vllaznija: Jubani; Hila, Pali; Alibali, Vasija, Koxhja; Shkjezi, L.Hoxha, Boriçi, Radovani, Gjinali.

Goals: Plluska 6', Lisi 13', Kryeziu 32', Kryeziu 40', Vasija 43', L.Hoxha, Lushta, Korça 60’, Boriçi 76', Boriçi 79', Boriçi 80'

Referee: Sinnico.
