= 1942 Albanian National Championship =

Albanian National Championship
- Season: 1942
- Champions: Tirana

Statistics of Albanian National Championship in the 1942 season. It was the first and only Nationwide Championship ever played, including the participation of Albanian and Kosovan teams at an official football event. This event is still not officially recognized from AFA, but in December 2012 the Albanian sports media have reported that this championship, along with the other two championships of World War II is expected to be recognized soon.

== Overview ==
1942 Albanian National Championship was the 10th season of Albania's annual main competition. It started on 14 June 1942, and ended on 29 June 1942. Ten teams were separated in one group of 4 teams and two groups of 3 teams, playing single round-robin system. Two first teams of the bigger group and only the first team of other two smaller groups would go into the semifinals. North Zone teams were: Shkodra, Prishtina, Peja and Prizreni. Middle Zone teams were: Tirana, Elbasani and Durrësi. South Zone teams were: Gjirokastra, Berati and Korça.

KF Tirana won the championship.

== Results ==
=== First round ===
In this round entered all the teams in three groups.

==== North Zone ====
Pos	Team	Pld	W	D	L	GF	GA	GR	Pts
1	Prizreni (Q)	3	3	0	0	10	2	5.000	6
2	Shkodra (Q)	3	2	0	1	4	3	1.333	4
3	Peja	3	0	1	2	3	5	0.600	1
4	Prishtina	3	0	1	2	2	9	0.222	1

Source: RSSSF.org
(Q) Qualified for the phase indicated

North Zone results:

Prizreni - Peja 2-1

Prishtina - Vllaznia 0-2

Peja - Vllaznia 0-1

Prizreni - Prishtina 5-0

Prizreni - Vllaznia 3-1

Peja - Prishtina 2-2

==== Middle Zone* ====
Pos	Team	Pld	W	D	L	GF	GA	GR	Pts
1	Tirana (Q)	2	1	1	0	6	2	3.000	3
2	Durrësi	1	0	1	0	1	1	1.000	1
3	Elbasani	1	0	0	1	1	5	0.200	0

Source: RSSSF.org
(Q) Qualified for the phase indicated

Middle Zone results:

Tirana - Elbasani 5-1

Tirana - Teuta 1-1

- Teuta - Elbasani result is yet unknown.

==== South Zone ====
Pos	Team	Pld	W	D	L	GF	GA	GR	Pts
1	Berati (Q)	2	1	1	0	8	2	4.000	3
2	Korça	2	1	1	0	11	4	2.750	3
3	Gjirokastra	2	0	0	2	2	15	0.133	0

Source: RSSSF.org
(Q) Qualified for the phase indicated

South Zone results:

Tomori - Luftëtari 6-0

Tomori - Skënderbeu 2-2

Skënderbeu - Luftëtari 9-2

== Semifinals ==
In this round entered the four winners from the previous round.

Team 1	Score	Team 2
Tirana	2-1(2-2)	Prizreni
Berati	1-3	Shkodra

=== Finals ===
In this round entered the two winners from the previous round.

Team 1	Score	Team 2
Tirana	1-1(2-0)*	Shkodra

- Note: Regular match ended 1-1 draw, but Shkodra refused to play 2x15 minutes extra time, therefore Italian referee Carone and AFA decided the match in Tirana's favour.
- Teams, scorers and referee:

Tirana: Kamba; Peza, Qiri; Visha, Fagu, Kurani; Parapani, Derani, Lisi, Bylyku, Mexhid Dibra.

Shkodra: Nuti; Boshnjaku, Muhamet Dibra; Pelingu, Nd.Pali, Gj.Berisha; Z.Berisha, Shaqiri, Puka, Kavaja, Nehani.

Goals: Bylyku 65', Nd.Pali 90'.

Referee: Michele Carone (Italy).
