= 1940 Albanian National Championship =

Albanian National Championship
- Season: 1940
- Champions: Shkodra

Statistics of Albanian National Championship in the 1940 season. This event is still not officially recognized from AFA, but in December 2012 the Albanian sports media have reported that this championship, along with the other two championships of World War II, is expected to be recognized soon.

== Overview ==
1940 Albanian National Championship was the 9th season of Albania's annual main competition. It started on 3 March 1940, and ended on 26 May 1940. Eight teams were separated in two groups of 4 teams each, playing double round-robin system and only the first team of each group would go into the finals. Group A teams were: Tirana, Shkodra, Elbasani and Durrësi. Group B teams were: Gjirokastra, Berati, Korça and Vlora.

Shkodra won the championship.

== Results ==
=== First round ===
In this round entered all the teams in two groups.

==== Group A ====
Pos	Team	Pld	W	D	L	GF	GA	GR	Pts
1	Shkodra (Q)	6	4	1	1	21	10	2.100	9
2	Tirana	6	3	1	2	12	10	1.200	7
3	Durrësi	6	3	1	2	12	11	1.091	7
4	Elbasani	6	0	1	5	11	25	0.440	1

Source: RSSSF.org
(Q) Qualified for the phase indicated

Group A results:

Vllaznia - Elbasani 6-1

Tirana - Teuta 3-1

Teuta - Vllaznia 4-2

Elbasani - Tirana 1-3

Tirana - Vllaznia 2-2

Teuta - Elbasani 3-3

Tirana - Elbasani 4-3

Vllaznia - Teuta 2-1

Vllaznia - Tirana 2-0

Elbasani - Teuta 1-2

Elbasani - Vllaznia 2-7

Teuta - Tirana 1-0

==== Group B ====
Pos	Team	Pld	W	D	L	GF	GA	GR	Pts
1	Korça (Q)	6	4	1	1	13	6	2.167	9
2	Vlora	6	3	2	1	17	11	1.545	8
3	Berati	6	2	1	3	11	11	1.000	5
4	Gjirokastra	6	0	2	4	4	17	0.235	2

Source: RSSSF.org
(Q) Qualified for the phase indicated

Group B results:

Luftëtari - Flamurtari 3-3

Tomori - Skënderbeu 0-2

Flamurtari - Skënderbeu 4-0

Tomori - Luftëtari 5-0

Tomori - Flamurtari 1-1

Skënderbeu - Luftëtari 3-0

Luftëtari - Tomori 0-2

Skënderbeu - Flamurtari 4-1

Flamurtari - Tomori 5-3

Luftëtari - Skënderbeu 1-1

Skënderbeu - Tomori 3-0

Flamurtari - Luftëtari 3-0

=== Finals ===
In this round entered the two winners from the previous round.

Team 1	Agg.	Team 2	1st leg	2nd leg
Korça	1-11	Shkodra	1-2	0-9

- Teams, scorers and referee:

Shkodra: Jubani; Rusi, Fakja; Xharra, Koxhja, Osmani II; Shkjezi, Vasija, Boriçi, S.Gjinali, Z.Berisha.

Korca: Mihallaqi; Dumja, Bitri; P.Saro, Luarasi, Ademi; Dimço, Plluska, Qirinxhi II, Duro, Merolli.

Goals: S.Gjinali 8', Shkjezi 21', Qirinxhi 58' (11-m).

Referee: Enver Kulla.

Shkodra: Jubani; Vasija, Pali; Osmani, Koxhja, Xharra; Rusi, Berisha, Boriçi, S.Gjinali, Shkjezi.

Korca: Mihallaqi; Bitri, Dume; Zeka, Lauarasi, Saro; Dimço, Plluska, Duro, Qirinxhi, Merolli.

Goals: Rusi 11', Boriçi 22', Boriçi 46', Rusi, Rusi, Rusi, Rusi, Rusi, Rusi

Referee: Sabit Çoku.
