= 1946 Albanian National Championship =

Albanian National Championship
- Season: 1946
- Champions: Vllaznia

The 1946 Albanian National Championship was the ninth season of the Albanian National Championship, the top professional league for association football clubs, since its establishment in 1930.

== Overview ==
It was contested by 12 teams, and Vllaznia won the championship.

== Regular season ==
=== Group A ===
Pos	Team	Pld	W	D	L	GF	GA	GR	Pts	VLL	17N	BES	APO	SKË	YIK
1	Vllaznia (Q)	10	10	0	0	32	3	10.667	20		5–1	2–1	6–0	6–0	4–0
2	17 Nëntori	10	8	0	2	26	7	3.714	16	0–1		5–0	3–0	3–0	4–0
3	Besa	10	3	3	4	10	12	0.833	9	0–1	0–1		4–1	2–0	0–0
4	Apolonia	10	2	2	6	8	22	0.364	6	0–2	0–3	0–0		1–3	3–1
5	Skënderbeu	10	2	1	7	10	26	0.385	5	1–4	1–3	1–1	2–1		2–0
6	Ylli i Kuq Durrës	10	1	2	7	7	23	0.304	4	0–1	0–3	1–1	1–1	4–3	

Source: RSSSF.org
(Q) Qualified for the phase indicated

Note: '17 Nëntori' is KF Tirana and 'Ylli i Kuq Durrës' is Teuta

=== Group B ===
Pos	Team	Pld	W	D	L	GF	GA	GR	Pts	FLA	BAS	ERZ	SHQ	SPA	TOM
1	Flamurtari (Q)	10	7	2	1	17	8	2.125	16		1–0	2–0	2–0	3–1	3–1
2	Bashkimi Elbasanas	10	7	1	2	18	7	2.571	15	2–0		3–1	2–0	3–1	3–1
3	Erzeni	10	4	4	2	14	11	1.273	12	0–0	1–1		3–2	1–0	3–0
4	Shqiponja	10	3	2	5	12	16	0.750	8	2–3	0–1	1–1		2–1	2–1
5	Spartak Kuçova	10	2	2	6	16	20	0.800	6	1–2	3–2	2–2	2–2		4–2
6	Tomori	10	1	1	8	7	22	0.318	3	1–1	0–2	0–2	0–1	2–1	

Source: RSSSF.org
(Q) Qualified for the phase indicated

Note: 'Bashkimi Elbasanas' is KS Elbasani, 'Shqiponja' is Luftëtari, 'Spartak Kuçova' is Naftëtari

== Finals ==
7 July 1946

Flamurtari	0–2	Vllaznia
		Mirashi 4', 58'

Vlorë

14 July 1946

Vllaznia	3–0	Flamurtari
Halepiani 5'; Çoba 51'; Shaqiri 80'

Shkodër
