= 1957 Kategoria e Dytë =

Kategoria e Dytë
- Season: 1957
- Champions: Puna Shkodër
- Promoted: Puna Shkodër

The 1957 Kategoria e Dytë was the 12th season of a second-tier association football league in Albania. The season started in March and ended in August. It's up to Puna Shkodër to win the 1957 championship and thus ensure promotion to the First Division, overcoming the competition of Puna Berat to which even the play-off in three matches with Puna Kavajë, penultimate in the major series, will not be in favor. Due to the dissolution of Spartaku Tiranë, relegated from the first division, at the end of the 1957 season, the Puna Peshkopi, last classified, manages not to return immediately to the regional divisions.

== League table ==
| Pos | Team | Pld | W | D | L | GF | GA | GR | Pts | Promotion |
|---|---|---|---|---|---|---|---|---|---|---|
| 1 | Puna Shkodër (C, P) | 14 | 11 | 2 | 1 | 39 | 8 | 4.875 | 24 | Promotion to 1958 National Championship |
| 2 | Puna Berat | 14 | 9 | 3 | 2 | 21 | 8 | 2.625 | 21 | Play-off promotion to 1958 National Championship |
| 3 | Puna Elbasan | 14 | 5 | 8 | 1 | 23 | 14 | 1.643 | 18 | |
| 4 | Puna Fier | 14 | 6 | 5 | 3 | 22 | 17 | 1.294 | 17 | |
| 5 | Spartaku Qyteti Stalin | 14 | 5 | 5 | 4 | 14 | 13 | 1.077 | 15 | |
| 6 | Puna Gjirokastër | 14 | 3 | 3 | 8 | 12 | 22 | 0.545 | 9 | |
| 7 | Puna Lushnjë | 14 | 2 | 3 | 9 | 16 | 28 | 0.571 | 7 | |
| 8 | Puna Peshkopi | 14 | 0 | 1 | 13 | 9 | 46 | 0.196 | 1 | |

(C) Champions; (P) Promoted

== Promotion playoffs ==
The second team of Kategoria e Dytë played in three matches promotion playoffs with the 7th of the National Championship (all in Tirana).

| Team 1 | Agg. | Team 2 | 1st leg | 2nd leg | 3rd leg |
|---|---|---|---|---|---|
| Puna Kavajë | 7–4 | Puna Berat | 0–2 | 3–1 | 4–1 |
