= 1971–72 Albanian National Championship =

Albanian National Championship
- Season: 1971–72
- Champions: Vllaznia; 3rd Albanian title
- Relegated: Tomori; Studenti
- European Cup: Vllaznia
- UEFA Cup: 17 Nëntori
- Cup Winners' Cup: None as same team achieved The Double
- Matches: 182
- Goals: 412 (2.26 per match)
- Top goalscorer: Ilir Përnaska (17 goals)

The 1971–72 Albanian National Championship was the 33rd season of the Albanian National Championship, the top professional league for association football clubs, since its establishment in 1930.

== Overview ==
It was contested by 14 teams, and Vllaznia won the championship.

== League table ==
| Pos | Team | Pld | W | D | L | GF | GA | GD | Pts | Qualification or relegation |
|---|---|---|---|---|---|---|---|---|---|---|
| 1 | Vllaznia (C) | 26 | 15 | 10 | 1 | 48 | 15 | +33 | 40 | Champions |
| 2 | 17 Nëntori | 26 | 14 | 9 | 3 | 44 | 23 | +21 | 37 | |
| 3 | Dinamo Tirana | 26 | 13 | 10 | 3 | 45 | 20 | +25 | 36 | |
| 4 | Partizani | 26 | 13 | 8 | 5 | 35 | 21 | +14 | 34 | |
| 5 | Labinoti | 26 | 9 | 14 | 3 | 30 | 16 | +14 | 32 | |
| 6 | Besa | 26 | 10 | 11 | 5 | 36 | 20 | +16 | 31 | Qualification for the Cup Winners' Cup first round |
| 7 | Shkëndija Tiranë | 26 | 12 | 5 | 9 | 36 | 33 | +3 | 29 | |
| 8 | Flamurtari | 26 | 9 | 8 | 9 | 28 | 36 | −8 | 26 | |
| 9 | Lokomotiva Durrës | 26 | 9 | 7 | 10 | 27 | 39 | −12 | 25 | |
| 10 | Skënderbeu | 26 | 6 | 12 | 8 | 23 | 23 | 0 | 24 | |
| 11 | Traktori | 26 | 5 | 9 | 12 | 23 | 36 | −13 | 19 | |
| 12 | Luftëtari | 26 | 5 | 4 | 17 | 14 | 39 | −25 | 14 | |
| 13 | Tomori (R) | 26 | 2 | 5 | 19 | 14 | 56 | −42 | 9 | Relegation to the 1972–73 Kategoria e Dytë |
| 14 | Studenti Tiranë (R) | 26 | 1 | 6 | 19 | 9 | 43 | −34 | 8 | Relegation to the 1972–73 Kategoria e Dytë |

Source: RSSSF.org
(C) Champions; (R) Relegated

Note: '17 Nëntori' is Tirana, 'Lokomotiva Durrës' is Teuta, 'Traktori' is Lushnja

== Results ==
| Home \ Away | 17N | BES | DIN | FLA | LAB | LOK | LUF | PAR | SKË | STU | SHK | TOM | TRA | VLL |
|---|---|---|---|---|---|---|---|---|---|---|---|---|---|---|
| 17 Nëntori | | 1–0 | 2–2 | 1–1 | 0–1 | 1–0 | 1–0 | 4–2 | 3–2 | 5–0 | 1–0 | 4–1 | 2–0 | 0–0 |
| Besa | 4–1 | | 2–0 | 1–0 | 2–2 | 0–0 | 2–0 | 2–0 | 1–0 | 5–0 | 6–0 | 2–0 | 0–0 | 0–0 |
| Dinamo | 1–2 | 1–0 | | 2–1 | 0–0 | 4–1 | 3–0 | 1–0 | 3–0 | 1–0 | 4–1 | 7–1 | 1–1 | 1–1 |
| Flamurtari | 2–2 | 2–2 | 2–1 | | 1–1 | 1–0 | 1–0 | 0–0 | 0–0 | 2–1 | 0–2 | 4–1 | 3–1 | 0–2 |
| Labinoti | 0–0 | 3–0 | 1–1 | 3–1 | | 3–0 | 2–0 | 0–0 | 0–0 | 1–0 | 1–2 | 4–0 | 1–0 | 0–0 |
| Lokomotiva | 1–1 | 3–2 | 0–2 | 1–1 | 1–1 | | 1–0 | 1–3 | 2–1 | 1–0 | 2–1 | 3–0 | 3–1 | 0–0 |
| Luftëtari | 0–1 | 1–1 | 1–1 | 1–2 | 1–2 | 0–1 | | 1–0 | 1–0 | 1–0 | 1–3 | 1–0 | 3–1 | 0–3 |
| Partizani | 2–1 | 0–0 | 1–1 | 3–0 | 1–0 | 2–1 | 1–0 | | 1–0 | 2–0 | 1–2 | 4–1 | 3–1 | 2–1 |
| Skënderbeu | 1–1 | 0–0 | 1–1 | 4–0 | 0–0 | 1–0 | 1–0 | 1–1 | | 0–0 | 3–1 | 0–0 | 2–1 | 1–1 |
| Studenti | 0–2 | 1–1 | 0–2 | 1–1 | 1–1 | 0–0 | 1–1 | 1–3 | 0–1 | | 0–1 | 0–1 | 0–1 | 1–4 |
| Shkëndija | 1–1 | 1–2 | 0–2 | 4–1 | 1–1 | 2–1 | 4–0 | 0–0 | 1–0 | 2–0 | | 2–0 | 1–1 | 0–0 |
| Tomori | 1–3 | 0–0 | 1–2 | 0–1 | 2–2 | 2–3 | 1–1 | 0–1 | 0–0 | 1–0 | 0–2 | | 0–1 | 1–3 |
| Traktori | 1–4 | 1–1 | 0–0 | 0–1 | 0–0 | 1–1 | 2–0 | 1–1 | 2–2 | 1–2 | 1–0 | 1–0 | | 2–3 |
| Vllaznia | 0–0 | 3–0 | 0–0 | 2–0 | 2–0 | 1–0 | 4–0 | 1–1 | 3–2 | 2–0 | 4–2 | 5–0 | 2–1 | |

Source: CalcioMondialeWeb.it
Legend: Blue = home team win; Yellow = draw; Red = away team win.
