= Medin Zhega =

Albanian footballer and manager

Personal information
- Date of birth: 31 January 1946
- Place of birth: Shkodër, Albania
- Date of death: 12 June 2012 (aged 66)
- Place of death: Tirana, Albania
- Height: 1.86 m (6 ft 1 in)
- Position: Forward

Senior career*
Years	Team	Apps	(Gls)
1962–1964	Vllaznia Shkodër		
1964–1970	Dinamo Tirana		
1970–1975	Vllaznia Shkodër		
1975–1976	Dinamo Tirana		
1976–1979	Vllaznia Shkodër		

International career
1965–1971	Albania	11	(3)

Managerial career
- 1980–1982: Vllaznia Shkodër
- 1982–1984: Albania (assistant)
- 1984–1986: Albania U23 (assistant)
- 1988–1991: Albania (technical director)
- 1994–1996: SV Bad Tölz 1925
- 1996–1997: KF Albanet Tirana
- 1999–2001: Albania
- 2001–2002: Prishtina
- 2002: Shkëndija
- 2002: Besëlidhja Lezhë
- * Club domestic league appearances and goals

Medin Zhega (31 January 1946 – 12 June 2012) was an Albanian professional football manager and player, who played as a forward.

== Playing career ==
=== Club ===
Firstly he played for Vllaznia the football team of Shkodra, then he went to Dinamo Tirana and he concluded his career at the team of Vllaznia. During his career he won several championships in Albania. Medin Zhega quit playing at the age of 32 on 9 September 1979.

=== International ===
He made his debut for Albania at age 19 years and 3 months in a May 1965 FIFA World Cup qualification match away against Switzerland and earned a total of 11 caps, scoring 3 goals. His final international was a June 1971 European Championship qualification match against West Germany.

== Managerial career ==
Following his playing career, Zhega became a manager and led the Albania during the 1999–2001 period. He won with Albania 2000 Rothmans International Tournament. Zhega became a coach, starting his career with his former club of Vllaznia. Later Albanet Tirana in Albania, Prishtina in Kosovo and Shkëndija in Macedonia. He also coached an amateur club in Germany named SV Bad Tölz 1925.

He got the honor award "Master of Work" given by the president of Albania.

== Personal life ==
He was born in Shkodra, Albania 31 January 1946. In May 2011, Zhega had an accident in Toronto, Canada, which made him paraplegic and he remained in a coma for a year until he died 12 June 2012 in Tirana.

He was survived by 2 sons. One of them, Kreshnik, has also played football for Besëlidhja and Teuta and was named assistant to coach Peter Pacult at FK Kukësi in 2018.

== Honours ==
=== Player ===
Vllaznia Shkodër

- Albanian Superliga: 1971–72, 1973–74, 1977–78
- Albanian Cup: 1972, 1979

Dinamo Tirana

- Albanian Superliga: 1966–67
- Albanian Cup: 1965

=== Manager ===
Vllaznia Shkodër

- Albanian Cup:1981

Albania

- 2000 Rothmans International Tournament: 2000

=== Individual ===
- Albanian Superliga top scorer: 1966–67 (19 goals)
- Albanian Footballer of the Year 1967
