= 1973–74 Albanian National Championship =

Albanian National Championship
- Season: 1973–74
- Champions: Vllaznia; 4th Albanian title
- Relegated: Luftëtari
- European Cup: None
- UEFA Cup: None
- Cup Winners' Cup: None
- Matches: 182
- Goals: 305 (1.68 per match)
- Top goalscorer: Ilir Përnaska (19 goals)

The 1973–74 Albanian National Championship was the 35th official season, or 38th season of top-tier football in Albania (including three unofficial championships during World War II). Dinamo Tirana were the defending champions. The season began on 16 September 1973 and concluded on 9 June 1974.

Vllaznia were crowned Albanian champions for the fourth time in their history.

== League table ==
| Pos | Team | Pld | W | D | L | GF | GA | GD | Pts | Qualification or relegation |
|---|---|---|---|---|---|---|---|---|---|---|
| 1 | Vllaznia (C) | 26 | 16 | 5 | 5 | 38 | 18 | +20 | 37 | Champions |
| 2 | Partizani | 26 | 13 | 9 | 4 | 37 | 16 | +21 | 35 | |
| 3 | Besa | 26 | 8 | 14 | 4 | 21 | 15 | +6 | 30 | |
| 4 | Dinamo Tirana | 26 | 11 | 6 | 9 | 24 | 19 | +5 | 28 | |
| 5 | Flamurtari | 26 | 9 | 10 | 7 | 24 | 24 | 0 | 28 | |
| 6 | Shkëndija Tiranë | 26 | 8 | 10 | 8 | 23 | 23 | 0 | 26 | |
| 7 | Labinoti | 26 | 7 | 10 | 9 | 21 | 20 | +1 | 24 | |
| 8 | Traktori | 26 | 6 | 12 | 8 | 21 | 30 | −9 | 24 | |
| 9 | Skënderbeu | 26 | 8 | 7 | 11 | 15 | 20 | −5 | 23 | |
| 10 | Lokomotiva Durrës | 26 | 7 | 9 | 10 | 17 | 23 | −6 | 23 | |
| 11 | Naftëtari | 26 | 6 | 10 | 10 | 16 | 24 | −8 | 22 | |
| 12 | Besëlidhja | 26 | 6 | 10 | 10 | 14 | 23 | −9 | 22 | |
| 13 | 17 Nëntori (O) | 26 | 7 | 7 | 12 | 21 | 28 | −7 | 21 | Qualification for the relegation play-offs |
| 14 | Luftëtari (R) | 26 | 5 | 11 | 10 | 13 | 22 | −9 | 21 | Relegation to the 1974–75 Kategoria e Dytë |

Source: RSSSF.org
(C) Champions; (O) Play-off winners; (R) Relegated

Note: 'Labinoti' is Elbasani, 'Traktori' is Lushnja, "Lokomotiva Durrës' is Teuta, '17 Nëntori' is Tirana

== Results ==
| Home \ Away | 17N | BES | BSL | DIN | FLA | LAB | LOK | LUF | NAF | PAR | SKË | SHK | TRA | VLL |
|---|---|---|---|---|---|---|---|---|---|---|---|---|---|---|
| 17 Nëntori | | 0–0 | 1–0 | 3–0 | 0–1 | 1–1 | 0–2 | 2–0 | 1–0 | 1–1 | 1–1 | 4–1 | 1–0 | 3–2 |
| Besa | 2–0 | | 1–1 | 0–0 | 3–0 | 1–0 | 0–0 | 1–1 | 1–1 | 0–0 | 2–0 | 1–2 | 1–0 | 1–0 |
| Besëlidhja | 1–0 | 1–1 | | 0–0 | 1–1 | 2–0 | 2–0 | 1–0 | 1–0 | 0–0 | 0–0 | 1–0 | 1–1 | 0–2 |
| Dinamo | 2–0 | 0–1 | 2–0 | | 2–1 | 1–1 | 3–1 | 1–0 | 2–0 | 2–0 | 1–0 | 2–1 | 3–0 | 0–0 |
| Flamurtari | 2–1 | 0–0 | 2–1 | 1–0 | | 1–0 | 2–1 | 1–0 | 1–1 | 1–1 | 0–0 | 0–0 | 3–0 | 0–1 |
| Labinoti | 3–0 | 0–0 | 2–0 | 0–0 | 1–0 | | 0–0 | 1–0 | 4–0 | 0–0 | 2–1 | 0–0 | 1–1 | 1–1 |
| Lokomotiva | 1–0 | 1–1 | 1–0 | 0–1 | 1–0 | 1–0 | | 0–0 | 1–1 | 2–2 | 0–1 | 1–0 | 1–2 | 1–0 |
| Luftëtari | 0–0 | 2–1 | 0–0 | 1–1 | 0–1 | 0–0 | 0–0 | | 2–1 | 1–0 | 1–0 | 1–1 | 1–0 | 2–3 |
| Naftëtari | 1–0 | 1–1 | 0–0 | 1–0 | 0–0 | 0–1 | 2–0 | 0–0 | | 0–0 | 2–1 | 0–0 | 1–1 | 2–1 |
| Partizani | 3–0 | 0–0 | 1–0 | 2–1 | 2–0 | 4–1 | 3–1 | 1–0 | 2–1 | | 2–0 | 3–0 | 4–0 | 1–1 |
| Skënderbeu | 1–1 | 1–0 | 2–0 | 1–0 | 2–0 | 2–1 | 1–0 | 0–0 | 0–1 | 1–0 | | 0–0 | 0–0 | 0–2 |
| Shkëndija | 2–1 | 0–1 | 3–0 | 3–0 | 1–1 | 1–0 | 0–0 | 1–1 | 1–0 | 1–2 | 1–0 | | 1–1 | 1–0 |
| Traktori | 0–0 | 1–1 | 0–0 | 1–0 | 2–2 | 2–1 | 0–0 | 2–0 | 2–0 | 1–3 | 1–0 | 2–2 | | 0–2 |
| Vllaznia | 1–0 | 3–0 | 3–1 | 1–0 | 3–3 | 1–0 | 2–1 | 3–0 | 1–0 | 1–0 | 2–0 | 1–0 | 1–1 | |

Source: CalcioMondialeWeb.it
Legend: Blue = home team win; Yellow = draw; Red = away team win.

== Relegation/promotion playoff ==
| Team 1 | Agg. | Team 2 | 1st leg | 2nd leg |
|---|---|---|---|---|
| Apolonia | 0–2 | 17 Nëntori | 0–0 | 0–2 |
