= 1982–83 Albanian National Championship =

Albanian National Championship
- Season: 1982–83
- Champions: Vllaznia; 6th Albanian title
- Relegated: Besëlidhja
- European Cup: Vllaznia
- UEFA Cup: None
- Cup Winners' Cup: 17 Nëntori
- Matches: 182
- Goals: 366 (2.01 per match)
- Top goalscorer: Dashnor Bajaziti (16 goals)

The 1982–83 Albanian National Championship was the 44th season of the Albanian National Championship, the top professional league for association football clubs, since its establishment in 1930.

== Overview ==
It was contested by 14 teams, and Vllaznia won the championship.

== League table ==
Pos	Team	Pld	W	D	L	GF	GA	GD	Pts	Qualification or relegation
1	Vllaznia (C)	26	12	10	4	39	19	+20	34	Qualification for the European Cup first round
2	Partizani	26	13	8	5	32	17	+15	34	
3	17 Nëntori	26	12	8	6	38	26	+12	32	Qualification for the Cup Winners' Cup first round
4	Flamurtari	26	11	8	7	28	23	+5	30	
5	Luftëtari	26	11	7	8	25	21	+4	29	
6	Lokomotiva Durrës	26	10	8	8	27	24	+3	28	
7	Skënderbeu	26	8	9	9	24	21	+3	25	
8	Dinamo Tirana	26	8	9	9	29	30	−1	25	
9	Labinoti	26	7	10	9	19	28	−9	24	
10	Tomori	26	6	10	10	15	24	−9	22	
11	Besa	26	6	9	11	28	35	−7	21	
12	Traktori	26	6	9	11	23	38	−15	21	
13	Naftëtari (O)	26	6	8	12	23	38	−15	20	Qualification for the relegation play-offs
14	Besëlidhja (R)	26	5	9	12	16	22	−6	19	Relegation to the 1983–84 Kategoria e Dytë

Source: RSSSF.org
(C) Champions; (O) Play-off winners; (R) Relegated

Note: '17 Nëntori' is Tirana, 'Lokomotiva Durrës' is Teuta, 'Labinoti' is Elbasani, 'Traktori' is Lushnja

== Results ==
Home \ Away	17N	BES	BSL	DIN	FLA	LAB	LOK	LUF	NAF	PAR	SKË	TOM	TRA	VLL
17 Nëntori		3–1	1–0	4–3	3–0	1–2	2–1	0–0	3–0	0–1	3–2	2–0	6–2	1–0
Besa	1–1		0–0	2–3	2–1	1–0	2–0	0–1	3–2	1–1	1–1	1–2	3–2	0–0
Besëlidhja	0–0	4–3		0–1	0–0	2–1	0–1	0–0	1–0	0–1	0–0	3–0	3–0	1–1
Dinamo	1–1	4–1	1–0		2–0	1–1	0–1	1–1	1–0	1–1	1–0	1–0	1–1	1–1
Flamurtari	3–3	1–0	2–1	2–0		3–0	2–0	2–1	3–0	1–0	3–2	0–0	0–0	2–1
Labinoti	3–0	1–0	0–0	1–1	1–1		2–1	1–1	0–0	0–0	1–0	1–0	2–1	0–0
Lokomotiva	0–0	1–1	1–0	3–1	1–0	1–0		2–0	6–0	1–1	1–0	1–1	2–0	1–1
Luftëtari	1–0	1–0	1–0	3–1	0–0	2–1	2–0		2–2	1–0	2–0	1–1	2–0	1–0
Naftëtari	0–1	2–2	0–0	1–0	2–0	3–0	2–0	1–0		0–0	0–0	3–1	0–0	3–4
Partizani	1–0	1–0	2–0	2–1	0–0	4–0	4–0	3–1	1–0		2–0	1–0	3–0	0–2
Skënderbeu	2–0	1–1	3–0	0–0	0–1	2–0	0–0	1–0	3–0	0–0		1–0	2–1	2–0
Tomori	0–0	2–1	0–0	1–0	1–1	2–0	0–0	1–0	0–0	3–1	0–0		0–0	0–2
Traktori	0–1	0–1	2–1	0–0	1–0	1–1	2–2	3–1	3–2	1–1	2–0	1–0		0–0
Vllaznia	2–2	0–0	1–0	3–2	2–0	0–0	1–0	1–0	4–0	4–1	2–2	3–0	4–0	

Source: CalcioMondialeWeb.it
Legend: Blue = home team win; Yellow = draw; Red = away team win.

== Relegation/promotion playoff ==
Team 1	Agg.	Team 2	1st leg	2nd leg
Minatori	3–5	Naftëtari	1–4	2–1

== Season statistics ==
=== Top scorers ===
Rank	Player	Club	Goals
1	(Albania) Dashnor Bajaziti	Besa	16
2	(Albania) Aleksandr Koçi	Naftëtari	12
3	(Albania) Andrea Marko	Dinamo Tirana	11
