= KF Vllaznia =

Albanian football club

Vllaznia
- Full name: Klubi i Futbollit Vllaznia
- Nicknames: Kuqeblutë; Djepi i Futbollit Shqiptar
- Founded: 16 February 1919; 107 years ago as Shoqëria Sportive Vllaznia (Vllaznia Sports Society)
- Ground: Loro Boriçi Stadium
- Capacity: 16,000
- President: Alban Xhaferi
- Manager: Csaba László
- League: Kategoria Superiore
- 2025–26: Kategoria Superiore, 3rd
- Website: vllaznia.al
Home colours	Away colours	Third colours

Klubi i Futbollit Vllaznia, commonly known as Vllaznia, is an Albanian football club based in the city of Shkodër. It is the association football branch of the Vllaznia Sports Club, which was founded on 16 February 1919. It is also the oldest club in Albania which means it is the first club created in Albania. The club have competed in every edition of Kategoria Superiore since 1930, which is the top tier of football in Albania, besides in the 1956–57, 1961–62 and 2018–19 football seasons.

Vllaznia is one of the most successful football clubs in Albania, having won nine Kategoria Superiore titles, eight Albanian Cups and two Albanian Supercups. They have only been relegated from the Kategoria Superiore three times in 1956 due to a disqualification, in 1961, and for the last time in decades in 2018.

The club's ground has been the Loro Boriçi Stadium since it was built in 1952, which is named after former Vllaznia and Albania national team captain. In 2016, the stadium was rebuilt into modern all-seater at the cost of €17 million, and it now has a capacity of 16,022, making it the second largest stadium in Albania.

== History ==
=== Background ===
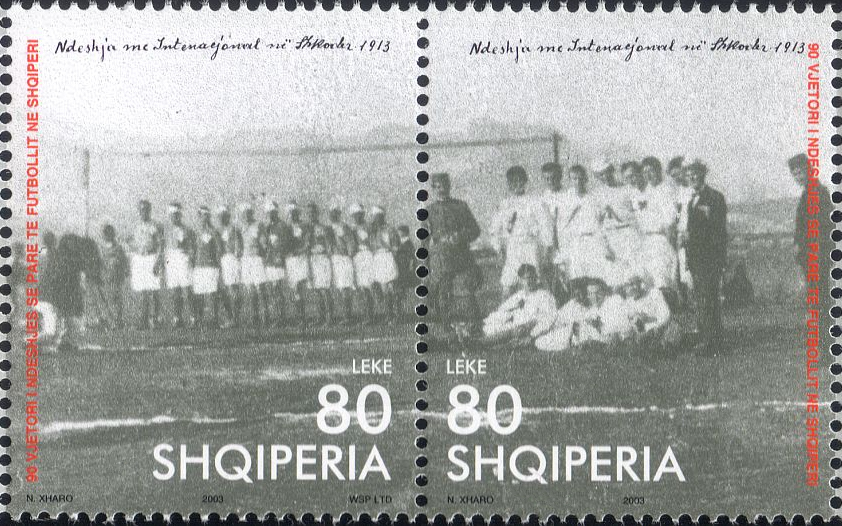
A 2003 postal stamp dedicated to the 1913 match between Austro-Hungarian Navy and Indipendenca Shkodër teams

Football was introduced to the city of Shkodër in 1908, when a Maltese priest, Father Gut Ruter, brought a football into the city, which is considered to be the first time football was played in the country. The first football club formed in Albania was Indipendenca Shkodër, which began operating in 1912 under the guidance of founder Palokë Nika, who was also the captain of the team. The first football game organised in city took place in October 1913 between Indipendenca Shkodër and the occupying Austro-Hungarian Imperial Navy. It was the first time a football team composed of Albanians had played foreigners, making it the first international game to ever take place involving an Albanian team, as well as being the first 90-minute football game to be played with two 45 minute halves in the country. Indipendenca Shkodër lost the game 2–1, with the captain Palokë Nika scoring the only goal for the home side.

=== Early history ===
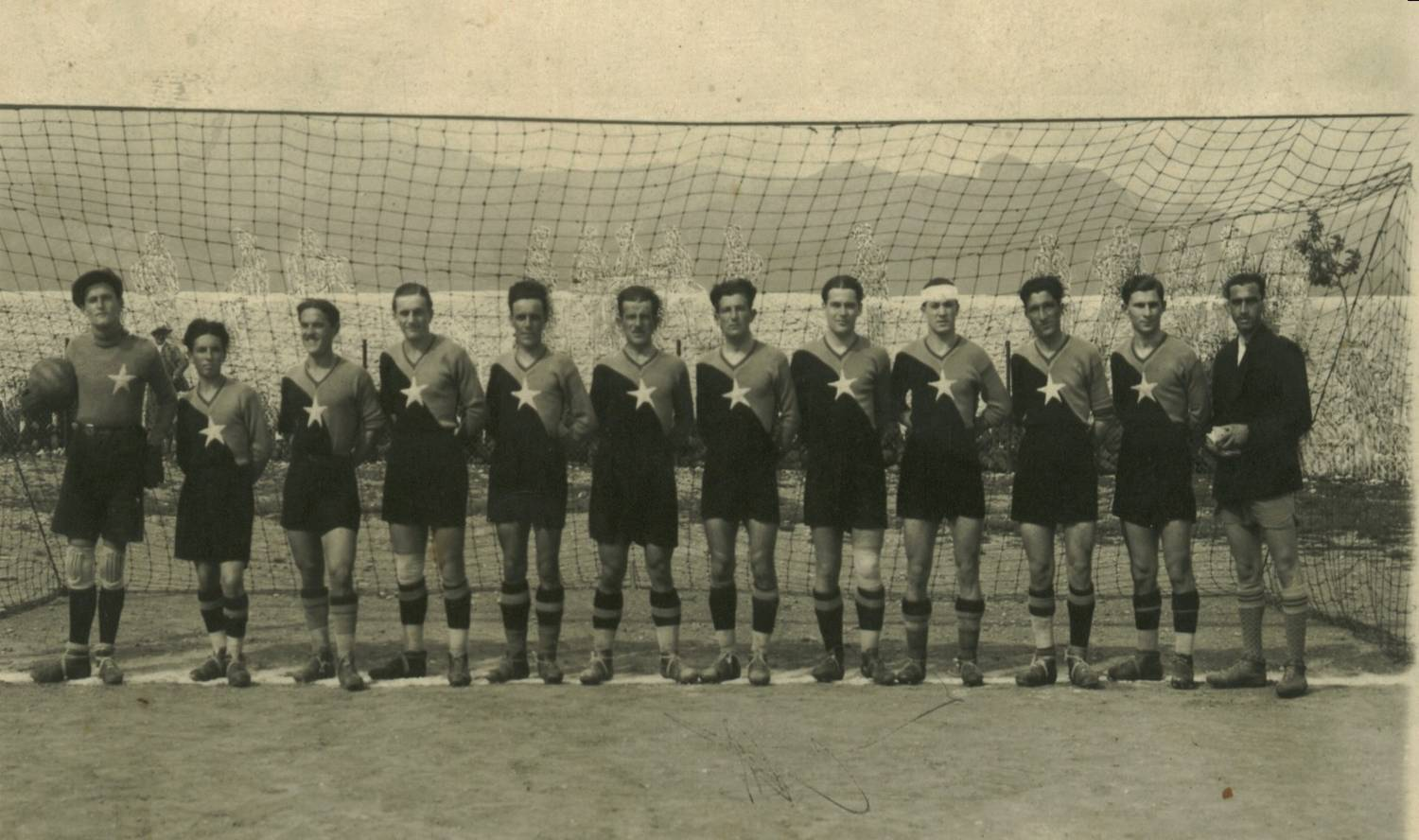
Left-right: Kin Bushati (goalkeeper), Ernest Halepiani, Gjelosh Gjeka, Pjeter Gjoka, Qazim Dervishi (captain), Muhamet Halili, Asim Golemi, Luigj Radoja, Gjon Kiri, Myzafer Pipa, Hile Staka, and Luigj Shala (coach) in 1935

Following the rise in popularity of football in the city, this prompted Palokë Nika along with other sportspeople in the city to form a club that would cater for many sports including football and on 16 February 1919 the Vllaznia Sports Society was formed. Vllaznia is a concept in Albanian culture often translated as "brotherhood;" it refers to loyalty to one's fis (clan, tribe). They played games against other Albanian teams, notably playing KF Tirana in their first ever game in October 1920. The club also played international games, the first of which was against the occupying Italian troops on 23 May, who beat Vllaznia 1–0. Later in the year for Albanian Independence Day on 28 November Vllaznia organised another football game against an Italian selection again, this time losing 5–1. The club's first game outside of Albania was played on 31 August 1922 in Montenegro against FK Lovćen Cetinje, a match which they lost 4–0. The club would continue to play domestic friendly games until the creation of the Albanian Football Association in 1930 and the start of the Kategoria e Parë in the same year.

=== Championships of World War II ===
During the peak of World War II, between the years 1939 and 1942, Albanian Football Association organized three championships, in 1939, 1940 and 1942. According to all information gathered in years from Albanian and foreign historians, players and veterans who lived these events, clear evidence proves the existence of these championships at that time, as well as the existence of three trophies given from Albanian Football Association officials themselves. One must not forget that 1942 Albanian Superliga had a nationwide participation – the first and the only one so far involving teams from both countries as Albania and Kosovo. KS Vllaznia won one such championship whilst KF Tirana won the other two championships in 1939 & 1942. This would update the championship trophies won by these clubs to respectively 10 and 26 at the present time.

After years of silence, Albanian Football Association have appointed a dedicated commission with 5 members, which is involved in gathering enough evidence in this regard. And finally, after a significant amount of evidence has been produced, it has been given an official date, when Albanian Football Association intend to officially recognize these 3 championships in their next General Assembly, to be held in February 2013.

In 1958 the club was renamed "KS Vllaznia". In the European Cup for Champions 1978/79 they beat Austrian team Austria Wien (who went on to the semifinals) 2–0 at home but lost 3–4 on aggregate. In the Cup Winners Cup of 1987/88 they reached the Round of 16 after beating Sliema Wanderes from Malta in both games (aggregate 6–0). In the 2001/2002 UEFA Champions league qualifying they beat KR Reykjavik from Iceland 2–1 in Reykjavik and 1–0 in Tirana with two goals from Klodian Duro. In next round KF Vllaznia were eliminated by the Turkish club Galatasaray 2–0 in Istanbul and 1–4 in Tirana. German Uli Schulze, a UEFA Cup Winners' Cup winner with 1. FC Magdeburg in 1974, was appointed as new coach in summer 2006. He was later replaced by Mirel Josa who is currently at his third spell coaching the team.

=== 2000s ===
In the 2000s, Vllaznia went through changes. In 2003 the President of Vllaznia, Myftar Cela, was shot in Montenegro. The President was loved by every Vllaznia fan due to his generosity and his love for the team. After Cela died, a group of businessmen gathered to help the team.

In 2006, an Albanian businessman, Valter Fushaj, became Vllaznia President. Since then he has been criticized by the fans for corruption and not wanting the best for the team.

In the 2009–2010 season Vllaznia went through some rough changes; having to change 3 coaches and also replace players. Vllaznia dropped to the bottom of the table, and having been criticized by the fans, Vllaznia went through some bad times.

On 17 April 2010, Vllaznia won 3–2 against Skënderbeu Korçë but the result was changed to a 2–0 loss for Vllaznia. This was because the player Ansi Nika wasn't on the team roster but was picked for the team anyway. This led to protests by the fans, making accusations that the Vllaznia staff and the President Valter Fushaj specifically did it for bribing reasons.

=== GEA Sport Era ===
Roberto Nava, the president of GEA Sport SA, bought 50% of KF Vllaznia and in July, Nava negotiated with Napoli to loan Sebastián Sosa on a one-year term in Shkodër. After successful negotiations with Napoli, Nava went on to buy Sebastián Rodríguez from Almería and Giorginho Aguirre from Corona Brasov.

Vllaznia were relegated from the Albanian Superliga in the 2017/18 season, a club that suffered their last demotion almost six decades ago in the early 1960s.

However, during the 2018/19 season, the team managed to gain promotion to the Superliga while also being crowned champions of the Albanian First Division (the second tier of Albanian Football), beating second-placed Erzeni to the title by a whopping 12 points.

In the 2019/20 season, Vllaznia finished eighth in the Superliga. They were then placed in the relegation play-off final against KF Besëlidhja Lezhë, but won 3–1 to secure their status as a top-flight club for another season.

The 2020/21 season saw Vllaznia jump up the table and have a very successful season, finishing on an impressive 66 points and securing a second-place finish that booked them a spot in the Europa Conference League Qualifiers. Teuta, the team that won the league, beat Vllaznia on goal difference.

Vllaznia also secured European football in the 2021/22 and 2022/23 seasons. In the 2023/24 Europa Conference League Qualifiers, they played the highly successful Northern Irish club Linfield F.C., but lost 3–2 on aggregate.

== Stadium ==
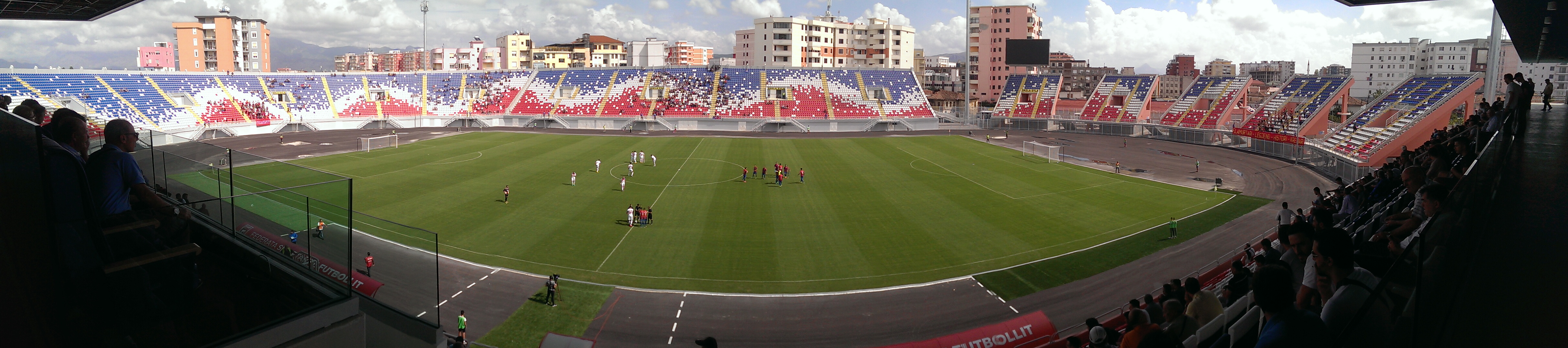
Loro Boriçi Stadium after reconstruction

The home ground of the club is called "Loro Borici". The name comes from one of the club's and Albania's greatest footballer to ever play, Loro played with some of the biggest teams at that time, with Roma and Lazio. The striker was known for his goalscoring abilities which he displayed in the Serie A after he left Vllaznia in the 1930s.

Loro Boriçi stadium is a multi-purpose stadium in Shkodër, Albania. It is currently used mostly for football matches and is the home ground of Vllaznia Shkodër. The stadium holds about 16,000 spectators and was reconstructed in 2001. It is named in honour of Loro Boriçi, famous player in the 1940s and 1950s. It is also the second largest stadium in Albania behind the Qemal Stafa Stadium in Tirana which seats 19,600.

In October 2014, Edi Rama, prime minister of Albania, promised the reconstruction of the stadium, which was last renovated in 2001. He said that the stadium will be with a renewed capacity of about 20,000 spectators.

On 3 May 2015, construction works officially started, bringing the stadium to a renewed capacity of 17,500 seats.

During the 2015–16 Albanian Superliga season, Loro Boriçi Stadium was under re-construction, therefore Vllaznia used Ismail Xhemali Stadium in Pukë at the beginning of the season and then switched to Reshit Rusi Stadium in Shkodër for much of the season.

== Fans ==
Vllaznit Ultras
- Abbreviation: V-U
- Established: 2005
- Type: Ultras
- Motto: Një jetë, dy ngjyra, një skuader.
- Headquarters: Shkodër, Albania
- Affiliations: (Belgium) Ultras Beveren (Albania) Tigrat Verdh e Blu
- Website: https://www.facebook.com/vllaznit05/

Vllaznia is a popular team amongst Albanian football fans in Albania, Kosovo and North Macedonia. The Ultras group of Vllaznia are known as 'Vllaznit Ultras' and were the first official ultras fan base in Albania who were created in 2005. They have strong ties with other Albanian Ultra groups such as the Ultras Guerrils who support KF Partizani Tirana, Armata E Veriut of FK Kukësi and 'Tigrat Verdh e Blu' who support AF Elbasani. It is known that Vllaznit Ultras meet up with opposition fans to greet each other before and after a game. Vllaznit Ultras are not just present in the football scene, they also attend Vllaznia's basketball matches to show their full support and love for Vllaznia at any sporting level. Fans of Vllaznia have always attended matches in high quantities, but in recent years the number of fans attending games has decreased due to the poor management and loss of confidence in the team. In the last 3 seasons the team has made a good performance in the league pretending for the title and also winning two Albanian Cups. This good performance has risen the passion and confidence among the fans, which has grown the number of fans in the stadium. They have ties with Ultras Beveren, the supporters of Belgian team Waasland-Beveren

Despite the low number of fans at Vllaznia's football games, they have recently turned up in strong numbers for the clubs basketball team, KB Vllaznia, due to their outstanding form in the past few years, having won the 3 Albanian Basketball League championships from 2014 to 2016.

== Rivalries ==
Vllaznia's all time enemies are KF Tirana who are the most successful side in Albanian football. Both teams had been the only two in Albania to not have been relegated from the top tier of Albanian football, until on the final match day of 2017, where both sides fought out who would survive and go down in front of a full crowd (Vllaznia 0–0 Tirana), Tirana were relegated. This rivalry is known as the "All-time Albanian derby". The rivalry is mainly in existence because both sides were the first two football teams to be found in Albania, where Vllaznia was found in 1919, whilst KF Tirana was found in 1920. Another reason why this rivalry potentially exists is due to the historic popularity between these two sides. Vllaznia and Tirana were the only sides in Albania to have never been relegated in the Albanian Superliga, they both hold 78 official seasons and 81 unofficial seasons (including three unofficial championships during World War II) in Albanian top flight football going into the 2016-17 Albanian Superliga season.

Both ultra groups, the Vllaznit Ultras and Tirona Fanatics are known for their fierce rivalry in the stands and off the pitch, which was shown in a match played in Loro Boriçi Stadium in Shkodër on 11 September 2014. During this game there was a lot of tension which began in the second half of the game. The game was interrupted when Tirana's fans started throwing bottles and other objects to show their anger towards the referee's decisions. Late on, Tirana grabbed an equaliser through Ervin Bulku to level 1–1, and this sparked a huge brawl between the fans. Tirana fans ran onto the pitch and seemingly started throwing chairs and bottles at Vllaznia fans. From then on Vllaznia fans started attacking Tirana fans inside and outside of the stadium. Vllaznia's fans gave an official statement on Vllaznia's official Facebook page where they stated that what Tirana fans did was seen as an embarrassment and an insult to people of Shkodra and Albanian football, therefore action was needed. Amongst some of the injured people was Tirana's president, Refik Halili who was hit by a fan of Tirana with a stone. Vllaznia fans were given a 10 match ban from attending home games, whilst Tirana were given 15.

Vllaznia has a fierce rivalry with Flamurtari Vlorë too. This rivalry dates back to the 70s when the two sides were the best teams in Albania. This is also the rivalry between the main clubs from the north and the south of Albania. This game is one of the most attended matches in Albanian football. The relations between fans of the clubs in and out of field are rude and supporters usually have troubles and violence.

Other derbies include the North Albanian derbies against Laçi and Kukësi. Laçi fans insist that the North Albanian derby is between Laçi and Vllaznia, whereas fans of Kukësi believe it is between Kukësi and Vllaznia. However history suggests that Besëlidhja Lezhë and Vllaznia were the most popular Northern Albanian sides decades ago.

== Honours ==
- Kategoria Superiore
  - Winners (10): 1940*, 1945, 1946, 1971–72, 1973–74, 1977–78, 1982–83, 1991–92, 1997–98, 2000–01
  - Runners-up (13): 1932, 1933, 1936, 1937, 1947, 1949, 1974–75, 1996–97, 1998–99, 2002–03, 2008–09, 2020–21, 2024–25
- Kategoria e Parë
  - Winners (2): 1957, 1962
  - Runners-up (1): 2018–19
- Albanian Cup
  - Winners (8): 1964–65, 1971–72, 1978–79, 1980–81, 1986–87, 2007–08, 2020–21, 2021–22
  - Runners-up (8): 1938–39, 1965–66, 1967–68, 1969–70, 1985–86, 1998–99, 2005–06, 2009–10
- Albanian Supercup
  - Winners (2): 1998, 2001
  - Runners-up (4): 1992, 2008, 2021, 2022

== KF Vllaznia Shkodër statistics in Kategoria Superiore ==
Since the Kategoria Superiore began in 1930, KF Vllaznia have played 1991 Superliga matches, scored 3181 goals and conceded 2053. The club has collected so far 2638 points, won 911 games, drawn 470 and lost 612. The club's goal difference is -106 and the winning difference is +1128.

Historical	Goals	Wins	Draws	Losses	+/-Goals	+/- Wins	Points	Matches
TOTAL	3181–2053	911	470	612	+1128	+1372	2638	1991

=== Recent seasons ===
Season	Division	Pos.	Pl.	W	D	L	GS	GA	P	Cup	Supercup	Europe		Top scorer
1998–99	Kategoria Superiore	2nd	30	18	6	6	57	18	60	RU	—	UCL	1QR	(Albania) Vioresin Sinani 14
1999–00	Kategoria Superiore	4th	26	11	4	11	29	28	37	QF	—	UC	1QR	(Albania) Edi Martini 8
2000–01	Kategoria Superiore	1st	26	17	5	4	51	22	56	SF	—	UIC	1R	(Albania) Vioresin Sinani 15
2001–02	Kategoria Superiore	5th	26	12	4	10	44	27	40	QF	W	UCL	2QR	(Albania) Vioresin Sinani 11
2002–03	Kategoria Superiore	2nd	26	15	4	7	51	32	49	SF	—	—	—	(Albania) Vioresin Sinani 17
2004–05	Kategoria Superiore	3rd	36	21	5	10	77	51	68	SF	—	UC	1QR	(Albania) Vioresin Sinani 36
2004–05	Kategoria Superiore	4th	36	19	4	13	80	47	61	SF	—	UIC	2R	(Brazil) Abílio 20
2005–06	Kategoria Superiore	6th	36	13	6	17	39	45	45	RU	—	—	—	(Albania) Vioresin Sinani 13
2006–07	Kategoria Superiore	3rd	33	18	9	6	46	28	63	QF	—	UIC	2R	(Albania) Klevis Dalipi 9 (Albania) Suad Liçi 9
2007–08	Kategoria Superiore	7th	33	12	9	12	46	46	45	W	—	—	—	(Albania) Vioresin Sinani 20
2008–09	Kategoria Superiore	2nd	33	19	7	7	49	29	64	SF	RU	UC	2QR	(Albania) Vioresin Sinani 14
2009–10	Kategoria Superiore	6th	33	13	7	13	34	39	46	RU	—	UEL	2QR	(Albania) Bekim Balaj 8
2010–11	Kategoria Superiore	3rd	33	17	8	8	41	27	59	SF	—	—	—	(Albania) Vioresin Sinani 11
2011–12	Kategoria Superiore	6th	26	10	5	11	38	32	35	SR	—	UEL	2QR	(Albania) Xhevahir Sukaj 9
2012–13	Kategoria Superiore	6th	26	11	5	10	30	26	38	SR	—	—	—	(Albania) Dritan Smajli 7
2013–14	Kategoria Superiore	8th	33	12	9	12	42	36	45	QF	—	—	—	(Croatia) Tomislav Bušić 13
2014–15	Kategoria Superiore	7th	36	11	5	20	27	41	35	QF	—	—	—	(Uruguay) Sebastián Sosa 7
2015–16	Kategoria Superiore	6th	36	11	6	19	36	42	39	QF	—	—	—	(Albania) Eraldo Çinari 6
2016–17	Kategoria Superiore	7th	36	8	16	12	29	35	40	QF	—	—	—	(Albania) Elis Bakaj 6 (Albania) Ndriçim Shtubina 6
2017–18	Kategoria Superiore	9th	36	12	8	16	38	42	44	SR	—	—	—	(Albania) Xhevahir Sukaj 10
2018–19	Kategoria e Parë	↑2nd	26	20	3	3	44	11	63	SR	—	—	—	(Brazil) Sílvio Júnior 9
2019–20	Kategoria Superiore	8th	36	12	10	14	36	41	46	SR	—	—	—	(Albania) Gilman Lika 10
2020–21	Kategoria Superiore	2nd	36	19	9	8	44	22	66	W	—	—	—	(Albania) Ardit Hoxhaj 12
2021–22	Kategoria Superiore	5th	36	13	16	7	47	38	55	W	RU	UECL	2QR	(Albania) Liridon Latifi 12
2022–23	Kategoria Superiore	4th	36	13	11	12	39	39	50	SF	RU	UECL	2QR	(Albania) Herald Marku 7
2023–24	Kategoria Superiore	4th	38	16	12	10	43	35	60	SF	—	UECL	1QR	(Albania) Bekim Balaj 18
2024–25	Kategoria Superiore	2nd	38	16	12	10	56	44	60	SF	—	UECL	1QR	(Albania) Bekim Balaj 19
2025–26	Kategoria Superiore	3rd	39	18	9	12	44	35	63	SF	—	UECL	2QR	(Albania) Bekim Balaj 14
2026–27	Kategoria Superiore										—	UECL	1QR	

== Records ==
- Biggest ever home league victory: Vllaznia Shkodër 8–0 Flamurtari Vlorë – 6 February 1999
- Biggest ever home league defeat: Vllaznia Shkodër 1–5 Skenderbeu – 11 May 2024
- Biggest ever away league victory: KF Laçi 1–7 Vllaznia Shkodër – 18 December 2004
- Biggest ever away league defeat: KF Tirana 5–1 Vllaznia Shkodër – 28 February 2004
- Biggest ever European home victory: Vllaznia Shkodër 3–0 (Bosnia and Herzegovina) Široki Brijeg – 15 July 2021
- Biggest ever European home defeat: Vllaznia Shkodër 0–4 (Turkey) Trabzonspor – 14 July 2007
  Vllaznia Shkodër 0–4 (Iceland) Valur – 18 July 2024
- Biggest ever European away victory: (Malta) Sliema Wanderers 0–4 Vllaznia Shkodër – 30 September 1987
- Biggest ever European away defeat: (Turkey) Trabzonspor 6–0 Vllaznia Shkodër – 8 July 2007
- Most European appearances: (Albania) Amarildo Belisha (23)
- Most European goals: (Albania) Xhevahir Sukaj (4)

Albanian records from September 1997

=== Record transfers ===
Rank	Player	To	Fee	Year
1.	(Albania) Hamdi Salihi	(Greece) Panionios	€500k	2004
2.	(Albania) Kevin Dodaj	(Bulgaria) PFC CSKA Sofia	€450k	2025
3.	(Albania) Bekim Balaj	(Turkey) Gençlerbirliği S.K.	€200k	2010
3.	(Albania) Rejan Alivoda	(United Arab Emirates) Kalba FC	€200k	2024
4.	(Albania) Armando Vajushi	(Bulgaria) PFC Litex Lovech	€110k	2012
5.	(Albania) Xhevahir Sukaj	(Turkey) Hacettepe S.K.	€100k	2009
5.	(Albania) Gilman Lika	(Turkey) Hacettepe S.K.	€100k	2009
5.	(Albania) Admir Teli	(Turkey) Hacettepe S.K.	€100k	2009
5.	(Albania) Geralb Smajli	(Kosovo) Ballkani	€100k	2025
5.	(Albania) Arjan Pisha	(Albania) Dinamo Tirana	€100k	2000

== KF Vllaznia in Europe ==
As of 15 July 2026.

Season	Competition	Round	Country	Club	Home	Away	
1967–68	Balkans Cup	Group A	(Bulgaria)	Beroe Stara Zagora	4–0	0–2	2nd
1967–68	Balkans Cup	Group A	(Turkey)	Gençlerbirliği	1–0	1–1	2nd
1967–68	Balkans Cup	Group A	(Romania)	Farul Constanța	2–1	1–2	2nd
1971–72	UEFA Cup	1R	(Austria)	Rapid Wien	n.d.	n.d.	
1977	Balkans Cup	Group B	(Greece)	Panathinaikos	1–1	0–3	3rd
1977	Balkans Cup	Group B	(Socialist Federal Republic of Yugoslavia)	Budućnost Titograd	1–1	0–2	3rd
1978–79	UEFA European Cup	1R	(Austria)	Austria Wien	2–0	1–4	
1979–80	European Cup Winners' Cup	1R	(Soviet Union)	Dynamo Moscow	n.d.	n.d.	
1983–84	European Cup	1R	(Germany)	Hamburger SV	n.d.	n.d.	
1986	Balkans Cup	QF	(Romania)	Gloria Buzău	0–0	0–3	
1987–88	UEFA Cup Winners' Cup	1R	(Malta)	Sliema Wanderers	2–0	4–0	
1987–88	UEFA Cup Winners' Cup	2R	(Finland)	RoPS	0–1	0–1	
1991–92	UEFA Cup	1R	(Greece)	AEK Athens	0–1	0–2	
1998–99	UEFA Champions League	QR	(Georgia (country))	Dinamo Tbilisi	3–1	0–3	
1999–00	UEFA Cup	QR	(Slovakia)	Spartak Trnava	1–1	0–2	
2000	UEFA Intertoto Cup	1R	(Cyprus)	Nea Salamis	1–2	1–4	
2001–02	UEFA Champions League	1QR	(Iceland)	KR	1–0	1–2	
2001–02	UEFA Champions League	2QR	(Turkey)	Galatasaray	1–4	0–2	
2003–04	UEFA Cup	QR	(Scotland)	Dundee	0–2	0–4	
2004	UEFA Intertoto Cup	1R	(Israel)	Hapoel Be'er Sheva	1–2	3–0	
2004	UEFA Intertoto Cup	2R	(Croatia)	Slaven Belupo	1–0	0–2	
2007	UEFA Intertoto Cup	1R	(Croatia)	Zagreb	1–0	1–2	
2007	UEFA Intertoto Cup	2R	(Turkey)	Trabzonspor	0–4	0–6	
2008–09	UEFA Cup	1QR	(Slovenia)	Koper	0–0	2–1	
2008–09	UEFA Cup	2QR	(Italy)	Napoli	0–3	0–5	
2009–10	UEFA Europa League	1QR	(Republic of Ireland)	Sligo Rovers	1–1	2–1	
2009–10	UEFA Europa League	2QR	(Austria)	Rapid Wien	0–3	0–5	
2011–12	UEFA Europa League	1QR	(Malta)	Birkirkara	1–1	1–0	
2011–12	UEFA Europa League	2QR	(Switzerland)	Thun	0–0	1–2	
2021–22	UEFA Europa Conference League	1QR	(Bosnia and Herzegovina)	Široki Brijeg	3–0	1–3	
2021–22	UEFA Europa Conference League	2QR	(Cyprus)	AEL Limassol	0−1	0–1	
2022–23	UEFA Europa Conference League	2QR	(Romania)	Universitatea Craiova	1–1	0−3	
2023–24	UEFA Europa Conference League	1QR	(Northern Ireland)	Linfield	1−0	1−3	
2024–25	UEFA Conference League	1QR	(Iceland)	Valur	0−4	2−2	
2025–26	UEFA Conference League	1QR	(Latvia)	Daugavpils	0−1	4−2	
2025–26	UEFA Conference League	2QR	(Iceland)	Víkingur Reykjavík	2−1	2−4	
2026–27	UEFA Conference League	1QR	(Kosovo)	Malisheva	2−1	0−5	

- QR = Qualifying Round
- 1R = 1st Round
- 2R = 2nd Round

== World & European Rankings ==
(As of 13 August 2026)

=== UEFA club coefficient ranking ===
Rank	Team	Points
226	(Moldova) Zimbru	6.000
227	(Georgia (country)) Dila	6.000
228	(Montenegro) Sutjeska	6.000
229	(Albania) Vllaznia	6.000
230	(San Marino) La Fiorita	6.000
231	(Belarus) Neman Grodno	6.000
232	(Azerbaijan) Sabah	6.000

== Players ==
=== Current squad ===
As of 1 September 2026

Note: Flags indicate national team as defined under FIFA eligibility rules; some limited exceptions apply. Players may hold more than one non-FIFA nationality.

No.	Pos.	Nation	Player
1	GK	ALB	Aron Jukaj
2	DF	ALB	Erdenis Gurishta
3	DF	ALB	Gledjan Pusi
4	DF	ALB	Andi Hadroj
5	DF	KOS	Fatbardh Latifi
6	MF	MDA	Cristian Dros
7	FW	KOS	Lirim Kastrati
9	FW	ALB	Bekim Balaj (captain)
11	FW	BEL	Edon Murataj
12	GK	MDA	Cristian Avram
13	DF	HAI	François Dulysse
14	FW	ALB	Patrik Bardhi
15	MF	NGR	Emmanuel Nwokporo
17	MF	KOS	Adnard Mehmeti (on loan from Partizani)
18	MF	GHA	Randy Dwumfour
19	FW	ALB	Aris Ara
20	DF	MKD	Xhezair Avduli
21	MF	ALB	Herald Marku

No.	Pos.	Nation	Player
22	MF	ALB	Sabion Bizi
25	MF	ALB	Klinti Qato
27	FW	ALB	Gerald Kubazi
29	DF	ALB	Emiljano Musta
30	MF	ALB	Amer Kthupi
31	GK	ALB	Rezart Bunjaj
33	DF	CRO	Bruno Brajković
40	MF	ALB	Ensar Tafili
44	FW	ALB	Sokol Uldedaj
45	FW	SEN	Mamadou Tounkara
60	FW	ALB	Amin Tahiri
66	DF	ALB	Simon Uldedaj
70	FW	ALB	Klajti Halili
71	GK	ALB	Alevio Ndoj
76	DF	ALB	Amir Brahimi
80	MF	ALB	Xhoel Hajdari
90	FW	VEN	Daniel Pérez

== Current staff ==
Position	Name
Head Coach	(Hungary) Csaba László
Assistant Manager	(Germany) Werner Bürger
Goalkeeping Coach	(Albania) Ideal Lekiqi
Sporting director	(Albania) Alban Bushati
Academy director	(Serbia) (Turkey) Sead Halilagić
Athletic Training Coach	(Albania) Aurel Locaj
Video Analyst	(Albania) Ardit Mani
Team doctor	(Albania) Zyhdi Çoba
Fiziotherapist	(Albania) Ilirjan Haxhaja
Fiziotherapist	(Albania) Armir Dibra
Masseur	(Albania) Brian Ferhati

== List of managers ==
- (Albania) Palokë Nika (1920s)
- (Albania) Ibrahim Dizdari (1945)
- (Albania) Ernest Halepiani (1946)
- (Albania) Skënder Jareci (1964–1965)
- (Albania) Xhevdet Shaqiri (1966–1979)
- (Albania) Medin Zhega (1980–1982)
- (Albania) Ramazan Rragami (1982–1985)
- (Albania) Astrit Hafizi (1985–1988)
- (Albania) Ramazan Rragami (1988–1990)
- (Albania) Astrit Hafizi (1990–1995)
- (Albania) Sabah Bizi (1995)
- (Albania) Hysen Dedja (1996–1998)
- (Albania) Vasil Bici (1998–1999)
- (Albania) Ramazan Rragami (1999–2000)
- (Serbia and Montenegro) Derviš Hadžiosmanović (2000–2001)
- (Albania) Astrit Hafizi (2002)
- (Albania) Hysen Dedja (2002)
- (Albania) Ramadan Shehu (2003)
- (Serbia and Montenegro) Derviš Hadžiosmanović (2003–2004)
- (Albania) Vasil Bici ( - 6 March 2005)
- (Albania) Agim Medja (6 Mar 2005 - Jun 2005)
- (Serbia and Montenegro) Derviš Hadžiosmanović (Jul 2005 - 5 October 2005)
- (Albania) Hysen Dedja (5 Oct 2005 - Jun 2006)
- (Germany) Ulrich Schulze (Jul 2006 - 13 November 2006)
- (Albania) Mirel Josa (13 Nov 2006 – 8 March 2008)
- (Montenegro) Derviš Hadžiosmanović (8 Mar 2008 – Jun 2008)
- (Albania) Agim Canaj (Jul 2008 – 2 March 2009)
- (Montenegro) Derviš Hadžiosmanović (2 Mar 2009 – Jun 2009)
- (Albania) Hasan Lika (Jul 2009 – 4 October 2009)
- (Albania) Roland Luçi (4 Oct 2009 – 22 December 2009)
- (Albania) Edi Martini (22 Dec 2009 – Jun 2010)
- (Montenegro) Mojaš Radonjić (Jul 2010 – 26 October 2010)
- (Albania) Mirel Josa (26 Oct 2010 – 25 October 2011)
- (Albania) Elvis Plori (Oct 2011)
- (Albania) Rudi Vata (25 Oct 2011 – 10 April 2012)
- (Albania) Armir Grimaj (10 Apr 2012 - Jun 2012)
- (Albania) Shpëtim Duro (Jul 2012 - 20 December 2012)
- (Albania) Artan Bushati (20 Dec 2012 - Jun 2013)
- (Albania) Agim Canaj (Jul 2013 – 9 March 2014)
- (Albania) Samuel Nikaj (Mar 2014)
- (Montenegro) Derviš Hadžiosmanović (9 Mar 2014 - Jun 2014)
- (Italy) Baldo Raineri (Jul 2014 - 3 March 2015)
- (Albania) Luan Zmijani (3 Mar 2015 – 27 September 2015)
- (Albania) Armir Grimaj (27 Sep 2015 – 9 January 2016)
- (Albania) Armando Cungu (9 Jan 2016 - Oct 2017)
- (Albania) Ernest Gjoka (Oct 2017 – May 2018)
- (Albania) Ervis Kraja (May 2018 - Jun 2018)
- (Albania) Hasan Lika (Aug 2018 - Mar 2019)
- (Albania) Agim Canaj (Mar 2019 – Jul 2019)
- (North Macedonia) Mirsad Jonuz (Jul 2019 – Jun 2020)
- (Albania) Hysen Dedja (Jun 2020 – Aug 2020)
- (Germany) Thomas Brdarić (Sep 2020 – Mar 2022)
- (Albania) Elvis Plori (Mar 2022 – May 2022)
- (Albania) Mirel Josa (May 2022 – Mar 2023)
- (Albania) Auron Miloti (Mar 2023 – Apr 2023)
- (North Macedonia) Goce Sedloski (Apr 2023 – May 2023)
- (Albania) Migen Memelli (Jun 2023 – Oct 2023)
- (Croatia) (North Macedonia) Qatip Osmani (Oct 2023 – Apr 2024)
- (Germany) Thomas Brdarić (Apr 2024 – May 2025)
- (Albania) Edi Martini (May 2025 – Sep 2026)
- (Hungary) Csaba László (Oct 2026 –)

=== Title winning Managers ===
Name	Period	Trophies
(Albania) Ibrahim Dizdari	1945	National Championship
(Albania) Ernest Halepiani	1946	National Championship
(Albania) Xhevdet Shaqiri	1971–1978	3 National Championships
(Albania) Ramazan Rragami	1982–1983	National Championship
(Albania) Astrit Hafizi	1991–1992	Albanian Superliga
(Albania) Hysen Dedja	1997–1998	Albanian Superliga, Albanian Supercup
(Serbia and Montenegro) Derviš Hadžiosmanović	2000–2001	Albanian Superliga, Albanian Supercup
(Montenegro) Derviš Hadžiosmanović	2008	Albanian Cup
(Germany) Thomas Brdarić	2020–2022	Albanian Cup
(Albania) Mirel Josa	2022–2023	Albanian Cup

== Notable players ==
- Hamdi Salihi
- Xhevahir Sukaj
- Vioresin Sinani
- Armando Vajushi
- Bekim Balaj
- Elseid Hysaj
- Rudi Vata
- Loro Boriçi
- Admir Teli
- Gilman Lika
- Erjon Vucaj
- Edon Hasani
- Dodë Tahiri
- Armando Cungu
- Palokë Nika
- Edi Martini
- Luan Zmijani
- Armir Grimaj
- Ramazan Rragami
- Elvin Beqiri
- Paulin Ndoja
- Amarildo Belisha
- Suad Lici
- Medin Zhega
