= Kategoria Superiore =

Albanian football league

Abissnet Superiore
- Organising body: Albanian Football Federation (FSHF)
- Founded: 6 June 1930; 96 years ago
- Country: Albania
- Confederation: UEFA
- Number of clubs: 10
- Level on pyramid: 1
- Relegation to: Kategoria e Parë
- Domestic cup(s): Albanian Cup; Albanian Supercup
- International cup(s): UEFA Champions League; UEFA Conference League
- Current champions: Egnatia (3rd title) (2025–26)
- Most championships: Tirana (26 titles)
- Top scorer: Vioresin Sinani (207 goals) (Note: 208 goals according to Albanian media.)
- Broadcaster: RTSH
- Website: fshf.org/abissnet-superiore
- Current: 2026–27 Kategoria Superiore

Kategoria Superiore (transl. Superior Category), also known as Abissnet Superiore for sponsorship reasons, is a top professional league for men's association football clubs in the Albanian football league system. It is contested by 10 clubs, and operates on a system of promotion and relegation with the Kategoria e Parë. Seasons run from August to May, with teams playing 36 matches (playing each team twice at home and twice away).

The competition was founded in 1930 as the Albanian National Championship during the reign of King Zog, shortly after the creation of the Albanian Football Association. Since 1930, 45 clubs have competed in recognised competitions, while only ten clubs have won the title: Tirana (29), Dinamo Tirana (18), Partizani (17), Vllaznia (9), Skënderbeu (8), Egnatia (3), Elbasani (2), Teuta (2), Flamurtari (1) and Kukësi (1). The current champions are Egnatia, who won their 3rd title in 2025–26.

== History ==
=== Early years ===
Football was first introduced to Albania by an English-Maltese priest named Gut Ruter, who visited the Saverian college in Shkodër in 1908. The first football club in Albania was Indipendenca, founded in Shkodër in 1912 by Palokë Nika. The first 90-minute game with two 45-minute halves was played in October 1913 between Indipendenca Shkodër and the occupying Austro-Hungarian Imperial Navy. The game is considered to be the first international game to be played in Albania, and it ended in a 2–1 loss for Indipendenca, with the captain and founder of the club Palokë Nika scoring the only goal for the Albanians.

=== World War II championships ===
Albania was invaded by Italy in April 1939 and World War II soon broke out, meaning the Albanian Football Association, much like the other organisations in the country, ceased operating. Despite the war, three championships were held between 1939 and 1942, with Tirana winning the championships in 1939 and 1942 and Shkodra winning in 1940. Despite calls to recognise these championships, the Albanian Football Association maintains the position that the championships were not organised by them and cannot be formally recognised.

=== Names ===
Name		Period	Notes
Albanian	English	Period	Notes
Kampionati Kombëtar Shqiptar	Albanian National Championship	1930–2003	—N/a
Kategoria Superiore	Superior Category	2003–present	The official name, even though from 2021 for sponsorship reasons the name changes.
Abissnet Superiore		2021–present	Sponsored by Abissnet.

=== Records ===
Most points in a season 84 points. KF Tirana (2004–05)

Most points without winning the league title 79 points. KF Elbasani (2004–05)

First Albanian team to qualify for a European competition proper stage. KF Skenderbeu (2017–18) Europa League

== Competition format ==
Since the 2026–27 season, the league consists of 10 clubs, who face each other three times in a season for a total of 27 matches. At the completion of the three phases, the teams are divided into two groups, based on the final ranking. The points accumulated during the regular phase are halved before the start of the play-off and play-out phases. The six teams ranked in the first places qualify for the play-off phase, where they play matches in a home-and-away system, with a total of 10 weeks of competition. The four teams ranked in the last places (from 7th place to 10th place) will participate in the play-out phase, where they will also play in a home-and-away system, in a total of 9 weeks of competition. The lowest-placed team is relegated to the Kategoria e Parë, while two highest-placed teams of the Kategoria e Parë are promoted in their place. The 9th ranked team qualifies to the play-off round, which they play against the Kategoria e Parë play-off loser.

== Clubs (2026–27) ==
2026–27 Kategoria Superiore teams.

=== Current members ===
The following teams are competing in the Kategoria Superiore during the 2026–27 season.

Club	Position in 2026–27
Dinamo City	4th
Egnatia	1st
Elbasani	2nd
Laçi	1st (Kategoria e Parë)
Partizani	5th
Skënderbeu	2nd (Kategoria e Parë)
Teuta	8th
Tirana	6th
Vora	7th
Vllaznia	3rd

== List of champions ==
Group tournament format
Season was not played
Season is not officially recognised

Season	Champion	Runner-up	Third place	Top scorer(s)	Goals
1930	Tirana (1)	Skënderbeu	Bashkimi Shkodran	Selman Stërmasi	5
1931	Tirana (2)	Teuta	Skënderbeu	Teli Samsuri	9
1932	Tirana (3)	Bashkimi Shkodran	Teuta	Selman Stërmasi	11
1933	Skënderbeu (1)	Bashkimi Shkodran	Teuta	Teofik Agaj	7
1934	Tirana (4)	Skënderbeu	Bashkimi Shkodran	Mark Gurashi	22
~~1935~~	Season was not played				
1936	Tirana (5)	Vllaznia	Besa	Riza Lushta	11
1937	Tirana (6)	Vllaznia	Besa	Riza Lushta	25
~~1938~~	Season was not played				
1939	Season played, but not officially recognised				
1940	Season played, but not officially recognised				
~~1941~~	Season was not played				
1942	Season played, but not officially recognised				
~~1943~~	Season was not played				
~~1944~~	Season was not played				
1945	Vllaznia (1)	Tirana	Besa	Xhevdet Shaqiri	9
1946	Vllaznia (2)	Flamurtari	17 Nëntori	Xhevdet Shaqiri	11
1947	Partizani (1)	Vllaznia	Dinamo Korçë	Zihni Gjinali	13
1948	Partizani (2)	Flamurtari	Bashkimi Elbasanas	Zihni Gjinali	12
1949	Partizani (3)	Vllaznia	Ylli i Kuq Durrës	Zihni Gjinali	14
1950	Dinamo Tirana (1)	Partizani	Shkodra	Loro Boriçi	6
1951	Dinamo Tirana (2)	Partizani	Puna Tiranë	Refik Resmja	59
1952	Dinamo Tirana (3)	Partizani	Puna Shkodër	Refik Resmja	10
1953	Dinamo Tirana (4)	Partizani	Puna Tiranë	Refik Resmja	9
1954	Partizani (4)	Dinamo Tirana	Puna Tiranë	Refik Resmja	13
1955	Dinamo Tirana (5)	Partizani	Puna Tiranë	Refik Resmja	14
1956	Dinamo Tirana (6)	Partizani	Puna Tiranë	Refik Resmja	17
1957	Partizani (5)	Dinamo Tirana	Puna Korçë	Niko Bespalla	12
1958	Partizani (6)	Besa	17 Nëntori	Skënder Jareci	13
1959	Partizani (7)	17 Nëntori	Flamurtari	Panajot Pano	9
1960	Dinamo Tirana (7)	Partizani	17 Nëntori	Skënder Jareci	13
1961	Partizani (8)	Dinamo Tirana	17 Nëntori	Panajot Pano	14
1962–63	Partizani (9)	Dinamo Tirana	Besa	Panajot Pano	12
1963–64	Partizani (10)	Dinamo City	Besa	Robert Jashari	18
1964–65	17 Nëntori (7)	Partizani	Dinamo Tirana	Robert Jashari	19
1965–66	17 Nëntori (8)	Partizani	Dinamo Tirana	Iljaz Çeço	12
1966–67	Dinamo Tirana (8)	17 Nëntori	Besa	Josif Kazanxhi	17
1968	17 Nëntori (9)	Partizani	Dinamo Tirana	Medin Zhega	19
1969–70	17 Nëntori (10)	Partizani	Vllaznia	Skënder Hyka	19
1970–71	Partizani (11)	Dinamo Tirana	Vllaznia	Panajot Pano	18
1971–72	Vllaznia (3)	17 Nëntori	Dinamo Tirana	Ilir Përnaska	19
1972–73	Dinamo Tirana (9)	Partizani	Besa	Ilir Përnaska	17
1973–74	Vllaznia (4)	Partizani	Besa	Ilir Përnaska	12
1974–75	Dinamo Tirana (10)	Vllaznia	Partizani	Ilir Përnaska	16
1975–76	Dinamo Tirana (11)	17 Nëntori	Vllaznia	Ilir Përnaska	19
1976–77	Dinamo Tirana (12)	Skënderbeu	Vllaznia	Ilir Përnaska	17
1977–78	Vllaznia (5)	Luftëtari	Partizani	Agim Murati	12
1978–79	Partizani (12)	17 Nëntori	Besa	Agim Murati	13
1979–80	Dinamo Tirana (13)	17 Nëntori	Vllaznia	Përparim Kovaçi	18
1980–81	Partizani (13)	Dinamo Tirana	17 Nëntori	Dashnor Bajaziti	12
1981–82	17 Nëntori (11)	Flamurtari	Dinamo Tirana	Vasil Ruci	12
1982–83	Vllaznia (6)	Partizani	17 Nëntori	Dashnor Bajaziti	16
1983–84	Labinoti (1)	17 Nëntori	Partizani	Vasil Ruçi	12
1984–85	17 Nëntori (12)	Dinamo Tirana	Vllaznia	Arben Minga, Faslli Fakja	13
1985–86	Dinamo Tirana (14)	Flamurtari	17 Nëntori	Kujtim Majaci	20
1986–87	Partizani (14)	Flamurtari	Vllaznia	Arben Arbëri	14
1987–88	17 Nëntori (13)	Flamurtari	Labinoti	Agustin Kola	18
1988–89	17 Nëntori (14)	Partizani	Dinamo Tirana	Agustin Kola	19
1989–90	Dinamo Tirana (15)	Partizani	Flamurtari	Kujtim Majaci	19
1990–91	Flamurtari (1)	Partizani	Besa	Kliton Bozgo	29
1991–92	Vllaznia (7)	Partizani	Teuta	Edmir Bilali	22
1992–93	Partizani (15)	Teuta	Besa	Edmond Dosti	21
1993–94	Teuta (1)	Tirana	Flamurtari	Edi Martini	14
1994–95	Tirana (15)	Teuta	Partizani	Arben Shehu	21
1995–96	Tirana (16)	Teuta	Partizani	Altin Çuko	21
1996–97	Tirana (17)	Vllaznia	Flamurtari	Viktor Paço	14
1997–98	Vllaznia (8)	Tirana	Partizani	Dorjan Bubeqi	26
1998–99	Tirana (18)	Vllaznia	Bylis	Artan Bano	23
1999–00	Tirana (19)	Tomori	Teuta	Klodian Arbëri	18
2000–01	Vllaznia (9)	Tirana	Dinamo Tirana	Indrit Fortuzi	30
2001–02	Dinamo Tirana (16)	Tirana	Partizani	Indrit Fortuzi	24
2002–03	Tirana (20)	Vllaznia	Partizani	Mahir Halili	20
2003–04	Tirana (21)	Dinamo Tirana	Vllaznia	Vioresin Sinani	36
2004–05	Tirana (22)	Elbasani	Dinamo Tirana	Dorian Bylykbashi	24
2005–06	Elbasani (2)	Tirana	Dinamo Tirana	Hamdi Salihi	29
2006–07	Tirana (23)	Teuta	Vllaznia	Vioresin Sinani	23
2007–08	Dinamo Tirana (17)	Partizani	Besa	Vioresin Sinani	20
2008–09	Tirana (24)	Vllaznia	Dinamo Tirana	Migen Memelli	22
2009–10	Dinamo Tirana (18)	Besa	Tirana	Daniel Xhafaj	18
2010–11	Skënderbeu (2)	Flamurtari	Vllaznia	Daniel Xhafaj	18
2011–12	Skënderbeu (3)	Teuta	Tirana	Roland Dervishi	20
2012–13	Skënderbeu (4)	Kukësi	Teuta	Migen Memelli	19
2013–14	Skënderbeu (5)	Kukësi	Laçi	Pero Pejić	20
2014–15	Skënderbeu (6)	Kukësi	Partizani	Pero Pejić	31
2015–16	Skënderbeu (7)	Partizani	Kukësi	Hamdi Salihi	27
2016–17	Kukësi (1)	Partizani	Skënderbeu	Pero Pejić	27
2017–18	Skënderbeu (8)	Kukësi	Luftëtari	Ali Sowe	21
2018–19	Partizani (16)	Kukësi	Teuta	Reginaldo	13
2019–20	Tirana (25)	Kukësi	Laçi	Kyrian Nwabueze	23
2020–21	Teuta (2)	Vllaznia	Partizani	Dejvi Bregu	16
2021–22	Tirana (26)	Laçi	Partizani	Saliou Guindo; Taulant Seferi	19
2022–23	Partizani (17)	Tirana	Egnatia	Florent Hasani	16
2023–24	Egnatia (1)	Partizani	Skënderbeu	Bekim Balaj	18
2024–25	Egnatia (2)	Vllaznia	Partizani	Bekim Balaj	19
2025–26	Egnatia (3)	AF Elbasani	Vllaznia	Bekim Balaj	14

Since 1930, the competition has not been played a total of 9 times: 1935, 1938–44, 1949, 1962. Furthermore, the champion award was not given during the 1968–69 season.

== Performance by club ==
Club	Champions	Runners up	Third places	Seasons
Tirana	26*	14	14	1930, 1931, 1932, 1934, 1936, 1937, 1939, (Note: Not yet officially recognized from Albanian Football Association.) 1942, 1964–65, 1965–66, 1968, 1969–70, 1981–82, 1984–85, 1987–88, 1988–89, 1994–95, 1995–96, 1996–97, 1998–99, 1999-2000, 2002–03, 2003–04, 2004–05, 2006–07, 2008–09, 2019–20, 2021–22
Dinamo	18	9	10	1950, 1951, 1952, 1953, 1955, 1956, 1960, 1966–67, 1972–73, 1974–75, 1975–76, 1976–77, 1979–80, 1985–86, 1989–90, 2001–02, 2007–08, 2009–10
Partizani	17	22	12	1947, 1948, 1949, 1954, 1957, 1958, 1959, 1961, 1962–63, 1963–64, 1970–71, 1978–79, 1980–81, 1986–87, 1992–93, 2018–19, 2022–23
Vllaznia	9*	13	15	1940, 1945, 1946, 1971–72, 1973–74, 1977–78, 1982–83, 1991–92, 1997–98, 2000–01
Skënderbeu	8	3	5	1933, 2010–11, 2011–12, 2012–13, 2013–14, 2014–15, 2015–16, 2017–18
Egnatia	3	-	1	2023–24, 2024–25, 2025–26
Teuta	2	6	7	1993–94, 2020–21
Elbasani	2	1	2	1983–84, 2005–06
Flamurtari	1	7	4	1990–91
Kukësi	1	6	1	2016–17
Besa	-	2	12	-
Laçi	-	1	2	-
Luftëtari	-	1	1	-
AF Elbasani	-	1	-	-
Tomori	-	1	-	-
Bylis	-	-	1	-

- Tirana and Vllaznia would have accordingly 29 and 10 titles, if the three seasons played during WW2 are officially recognised from AFA.

== All time table ==
The all-time table of football clubs that have participated in the Kategoria Superiore, prior to the 2025–2026 season. The ranking is based on the total accumulated points by each club. Teams in bold are part of the 2025–26 season. In the all-time table are not included the results in the final four round, introduced by 2024–25 season. Teams in bold are part of 2025–2026 season.

No.	Club	Apps.	Matches	Wins	Ties	Losses	Goals ±	GDif.	Points	Titles
1	**Tirana**	86	2204	1110	583	511	3573:2012	+1561	3265	29
2	**Partizani**	73	1886	1130	387	338	3276:1657	+1619	2996	17
3	**Vllaznia**	85	2174	987	529	680	3406:2234	+1172	2922	9
4	**Teuta**	85	2196	808	632	777	2189:2445	-256	2546	2
5	**Dinamo**	65	1862	898	512	425	2916:1689	+1228	2532	18
6	**Flamurtari**	74	1942	671	528	743	2189:2365	-176	2096	1
7	Skënderbeu	68	1637	548	428	646	1745:1988	-243	1770	8
8	Elbasani	65	1593	513	423	654	1673:2029	-356	1626	2
9	Besa	63	1575	542	444	589	1790:1908	-118	1670	—
10	Lushnja	41	1139	299	326	511	1069:1559	-490	1046	—
11	Laçi	25	819	301	197	321	898:985	-87	1042	—
12	Luftëtari	43	1132	322	270	550	1047:1616	-569	1014	—
13	Tomori	44	1052	297	321	471	1026:1487	-461	938	—
14	Apolonia	37	989	277	232	465	984:1505	-521	879	—
15	Shkumbini	18	553	211	107	228	660:708	-48	713	—
16	Kukësi	12	419	192	106	115	567:412	+155	681	1
17	**Bylis**	18	531	172	142	242	588:738	-150	654	—
18	Kastrioti	15	494	155	107	231	469:660	-191	527	—
19	Besëlidhja	22	575	148	167	260	556:721	-165	497	—
20	**Egnatia**	6	219	83	59	78	256:232	+24	301	3
21	Naftëtari	16	384	90	109	185	322:635	-313	289	—
22	Shkëndija	10	258	68	87	103	217:283	-66	223	—
23	Erzeni	8	170	37	47	86	169:313	-144	155	—
24	Albpetrol	6	167	49	33	85	158:259	-101	136	—
25	**AF Elbasani**	2	75	30	28	16	93:80	+13	118	—
26	Pogradeci	9	210	38	39	133	167:466	-299	118	—
27	Sopoti	4	112	36	25	51	107:150	-43	110	—
28	Kamza	4	98	23	21	54	72:139	-67	90	—
29	Burreli	5	109	23	23	63	96:183	-87	77	—
30	Luftëtari Tiranë	5	50	19	7	24	60:64	-4	45	—
31	**Vora**	1	36	10	12	14	39:40	-1	42	—
32	Spartaku Tiranë	3	66	10	17	39	68:132	-64	37	—
33	Spartaku Shkodër	2	38	12	10	16	45:82	-37	34	—
34	Dinamo Shkodër	1	30	13	7	10	46:41	+5	33	—
35	Dinamo Durrës	3	40	8	13	19	30:71	-41	29	—
36	Selenica	1	30	10	7	13	33:54	-21	27	—
37	Gramozi	1	33	6	8	19	25:43	-18	26	—
38	Kombinati Tiranë	2	30	7	11	12	28:39	-11	25	—
39	Korabi	2	58	3	13	42	21:116	-95	21	—
40	Tërbuni	1	36	4	6	26	22:81	-59	18	—
41	Dinamo Vlorë	1	20	6	4	10	19:48	-29	16	—
42	Iliria	1	30	7	2	21	22:64	-42	16	—
43	24 Maj Përmet	1	26	4	5	1	9:44	-35	13	—
44	Ylli Shkodër	1	10	5	1	4	29:15	+14	11	—
45	Liria Korçë	1	10	3	2	5	16:15	+1	8	—
46	Studenti	1	26	1	6	19	9:43	-34	8	—
47	Spartaku Korçë	1	12	2	1	9	10:45	-35	5	—

== UEFA rankings ==
=== Current rankings (2026–27) ===
UEFA Country Ranking for league participation in 2026–27 European football season (Previous year rank in italics).

- 42 (42) (Northern Ireland) NIFL Premiership
- 43 (44) (Lithuania) TOPLYGA
- 44 (40) Liechtenstein Football Cup
- 45 (48) (Estonia) Meistriliiga
- 46 (47) (Albania) Kategoria Superiore
- 47 (53) (Montenegro) Montenegrin First League
- 48 (43) Luxembourg National Division
- 49 (52) (Wales) Cymru Premier
- 50 (46) (Georgia (country)) Erovnuli Liga

== See also ==
- List of football clubs in Albania
- List of Kategoria Superiore all-time goalscorers

== Notes and references ==
Notes
