= List of Kategoria Superiore top scorers =

The following is the list of Kategoria Superiore top scorers by season, since the inception of the Albanian National Championship in 1930 until the present day. Refik Resmja holds the record for most goals in a single season at 59, and he also holds the record for most awards won, with seven. The latest top scorer of the Kategoria Superiore is Dejvi Bregu of Teuta.

== Winners ==
Key
Player (X)	Name of the player and number of times they had won the award at that point (if more than one)
Games	The number of Kategoria Superiore games played by the winner that season
Rate	The winner's goals-to-games ratio that season
†	Indicates that the award was shared
§	Denotes the club were Kategoria Superiore champions in the same season

Season	Player	Nationality	Club	Goals	Games	Rate
1930^{†}	Emil Hajnali	Albania	Tirana^{§}	3		
1930^{†}	Rexhep Maçi	Albania	Tirana^{§}	3		
1931	Aristotel Samsuri	Albania	Skënderbeu	9	6	1.5000
1932	Haki Korça	Albania	Tirana^{§}	4		
1933	Servet Teufik Agaj	Albania; Turkey	Skënderbeu^{§}	7	5	1.4000
1934	Mark Gurashi	Albania	Tirana^{§}	12		
Championship not played in 1935
1936	Riza Lushta	Albania; Yugoslavia	Tirana^{§}	11		
1937	Riza Lushta (2)	Albania; Yugoslavia	Tirana^{§}	25		
Championship not played between 1938–1944 due to World War II
1945	Loro Boriçi	Albania	Vllaznia^{§}	11		
1946	Xhevdet Shaqiri	Albania	Vllaznia^{§}	11		
1947	Hamdi Bakalli	Albania	Partizani^{§}	7		
1948^{†}	Tish Daija	Albania	Flamurtari	11		
1948^{†}	Zihni Gjinali	Albania	Partizani^{§}	11		
1949	Zihni Gjinali (2)	Albania	Partizani^{§}	14		
1950	Loro Boriçi	Albania	Partizani	9		
1951	Refik Resmja	Albania	Partizani	59	23	2.5652
1952	Refik Resmja (2)	Albania	Partizani	17		
1953	Refik Resmja (3)	Albania	Partizani	9		
1954	Refik Resmja (4)	Albania	Partizani^{§}	13		
1955^{†}	Refik Resmja (5)	Albania	Partizani	23		
1955^{†}	Skënder Jareci	Albania	Dinamo^{§}	23		
1956	Refik Resmja (6)	Albania	Partizani	17		
1957	Niko Bespalla	Albania; Soviet Union	Partizani	15		
1958	Skënder Jareci (2)	Albania	Dinamo	14		
1960	Skënder Jareci (3)	Albania	Dinamo	16		
1970–71	Ilir Përnaska	Albania	Dinamo	19		
1971–72	Ilir Përnaska (2)	Albania	Dinamo	17		
1972–73	Ilir Përnaska (3)	Albania	Dinamo^{§}	12		
1973–74	Ilir Përnaska (4)	Albania	Dinamo	19		
1974–75	Ilir Përnaska (5)	Albania	Dinamo^{§}	17		
1975–76	Ilir Përnaska (6)	Albania	Dinamo^{§}	18		
1976–77	Agim Murati	Albania	Partizani	12		
1977–78	Agim Murati (2)	Albania	Partizani	14		
1978–79^{†}	Agim Murati (3)	Albania	Partizani^{§}	14		
1978–79^{†}	Petrit Dibra	Albania	Tirana	14		
1979–80	Përparim Kovaçi	Albania	Tomori	18		
1980–81	Dashnor Bajaziti	Albania	Besa	12		
1981–82	Vasil Ruci	Albania	Flamurtari	12		
1982–83	Dashnor Bajaziti (2)	Albania	Besa	16		
1983–84	Vasil Ruci (2)	Albania	Flamurtari	12		
1984–85^{†}	Faslli Fakja	Albania	Vllaznia	13		
1984–85^{†}	Arben Minga	Albania	Tirana^{§}	13		
1985–86	Kujtim Majaci	Albania	Apolonia	20		
1986–87	Arben Arbëri	Albania	Tomori	14		
1987–88	Agustin Kola	Albania	Tirana^{§}	18	33	0.5454
1988–89	Agustin Kola (2)	Albania	Tirana^{§}	19		
1989–90	Kujtim Majaci (2)	Albania	Apolonia	19		
1990–91	Kliton Bozgo	Albania	Tomori	29	38	0.7631
1991–92	Edmir Bilali	Albania	Vllaznia^{§}	20	29	0.6896
1992–93	Edmond Dosti	Albania	Partizani^{§}	21	27	0.7777
1993–94	Edi Martini	Albania	Vllaznia	14	24	0.5833
1994–95	Arben Shehu	Albania	Luftëtari	21	28	0.7500
1995–96	Altin Çuko	Albania	Tomori/Laçi	21		
1996–97	Viktor Paço	Albania	Flamurtari	14		
1997–98	Dorian Bubeqi	Albania	Shkumbini	26		
1998–99	Artan Bano	Albania	Lushnja	22		
1999–00	Klodian Arbëri	Albania	Tomori	18	25	0.7200
2000–01	Indrit Fortuzi	Albania	Tirana	31	25	1.2400
2001–02	Indrit Fortuzi (2)	Albania	Tirana	24	24	1.0000
2002–03	Mahir Halili	Albania	Tirana^{§}	20	22	0.9090
2003–04	Vioresin Sinani	Albania	Vllaznia	36	35	1.0285
2004–05	Dorian Bylykbashi	Albania	Partizani	24	31	0.7741
2005–06	Hamdi Salihi	Albania	Tirana	29	35	0.8285
2006–07	Vioresin Sinani (2)	Albania	Tirana^{§}	23	29	0.7931
2007–08	Vioresin Sinani (3)	Albania	Vllaznia	20	30	0.6666
2008–09	Migen Memelli	Albania	Tirana^{§}	22	29	0.7586
2009–10	Daniel Xhafaj	Albania	Besa	18	31	0.5806
2010–11	Daniel Xhafaj (2)	Albania	Flamurtari	19	31	0.6129
2011–12	Roland Dervishi	Albania	Shkumbini	20	25	0.8000
2012–13	Migen Memelli (2)	Albania	Flamurtari	19	22	0.8636
2013–14	Pero Pejić	Croatia	Skënderbeu^{§}	20	30	0.6667
2014–15	Pero Pejić (2)	Croatia	Kukësi	31	34	0.9117
2015–16	Hamdi Salihi (2)	Albania	Skënderbeu^{§}	27	30	0.9000
2016–17	Pero Pejić (3)	Croatia	Kukësi^{§}	28	34	0.8235
2017–18	Ali Sowe	Gambia	Skënderbeu^{§}	21	33	0.6364
2018–19	Reginaldo Faife	Mozambique	Kukësi	13	33	0.3939
2019–20	Kyrian Nwabueze	Nigeria	Laçi	24	31	0.7742
2020–21	Dejvi Bregu	Albania	Teuta^{§}	16	36	0.4444
2021–22	Saliou Guindo Taulant Seferi	Mali; Albania	Laçi; Tirana^{§}	19; 19	34; 35	0.7742; 0.5428
2022–23	Florent Hasani	Kosovo	Tirana	16	34	0.4705
2023–24	Bekim Balaj	Albania	Vllaznia	18	36	0.5
2024–25	Bekim Balaj (2)	Albania	Vllaznia	19	36	0.5277
2025–26	Bekim Balaj (3)	Albania	Vllaznia	14	39	2

== Awards by players ==
Name	Country	Total	Seasons
Ilir Përnaska	Albania	6	1970–71, 1971–72, 1972–73, 1973–74, 1974–75, 1975–76
Refik Resmja	Albania	6	1951, 1952, 1952, 1953, 1954, 1955
Bekim Balaj	Albania	3	2023–24, 2024–25,2025–26
Robert Jashari	Albania	3	1961, 1962, 1963
Skënder Jareci	Albania	3	1955, 1958, 1960
Agim Murati	Albania	3	1976–77, 1977–78, 1978–79
Pero Pejić	Croatia	3	2013–14, 2014–15, 2016–17
Panajot Pano	Albania	2	1969-70, 1969–70
Daniel Xhafaj	Albania	2	2009–10, 2010–11
Migen Memelli	Albania	2	2008–09, 2012–13
Hamdi Salihi	Albania	2	2005–06, 2015–16
Indrit Fortuzi	Albania	2	2000–01, 2001–02
Kujtim Majaci	Albania	2	1985–86, 1989–90
Agustin Kola	Albania	2	1987–88, 1988–89
Dashnor Bajaziti	Albania	2	1980–81, 1982–83
Zihni Gjinali	Albania	2	1948, 1949
Riza Lushta	Albania	2	1936, 1937

== Awards won by nationality ==
Country	Total
Albania	53
Croatia	3
Yugoslavia	2
Soviet Union	1
Gambia	1
Mali	1
Turkey	1
Mozambique	1
Nigeria	1
Kosovo	1

== Awards won by club ==
Club	Total
Partizani	19
Tirana	18
Vllaznia	10
Dinamo	9
Skënderbeu	5
Tomori	5
Flamurtari	5
Besa	3
Laçi	3
Shkumbini	2
Kukësi	2
Apolonia	2
Luftëtari	1
Lushnja	1
Teuta	1

== See also ==
- Capocannoniere
- Premier League Golden Boot
- List of Bundesliga top scorers
- List of Süper Lig top scorers
- European Golden Shoe
- List of top international association football goal scorers by country
