= Aleko Pilika =

Albanian footballer (born 1940)

Personal information
- Date of birth: 29 May 1940 (age 86)
- Place of birth: Tirana, Albania
- Position: Forward

Senior career*
Years	Team	Apps	(Gls)
1958–1963	KF Skenderbeu		
1963–1965	Dinamo Tirana		
1965–1971	KF Skenderbeu		

Managerial career
- 1975–1978: KF Skenderbeu
- 1996–1997: KF Skenderbeu
- * Club domestic league appearances and goals

Aleko Pilika (born 29 May 1940) is an Albanian professional football player and manager. He played for KF Skenderbeu and Dinamo Tirana. After retiring as a player, he returned to KF Skenderbeu as manager of the club and led them to their first ever European competition.

== Early life and origins ==
Aleko Pilika was born in Tirana, Albania, in 1940 to Gaqo Pilika and Eleni Pilika (née Polena). He had two brothers, Angji Pilika and Zhani Pilika, and a sister, Fedra Pilika. His father's family was from Korçë, with his paternal grandmother Konstandina Floriri being native to the city. His grandfather, Giovani Pilika, was a lawyer who moved to Korçë from Athens and came from a stradioti noble family that inhabited Cephalonia. His mother's family came from the village of Polenë in the Korça region; his maternal grandparents were Perik Polena and Athina Polena. He and his family are of the Orthodox Christian faith. He and his family are ethnic Albanians who speak the Albanian language in the Tosk dialect, however his parents and grandparents also knew the Greek language. His father studied in Florina, and visited Thessaloniki. He was always passionate about football.

== Club career ==
=== KF Skenderbeu ===
As a child, Pilika started out as a defender; however, as he got older, he shifted into the forward position and remained as one throughout his senior career. He started his career in the youth ranks at KF Skenderbeu, his local team in Korça, before joining the first team at age 18. During his youth career, he won the youth league of Kategoria Superiore in 1958 as a centre back with KF Skenderbeu. This victory convinced KF Skenderbeu to put him into the first team. He made his first team debut on 22 March 1959, the first week of the championship, replacing Angjel Dvoran in a match in Elbasan. He scored his first goal a week later in the first minute of play of a victory against Vllaznia. His manager at the time was S. Qirinxhi, who pushed him to become a forward. He stayed with KF Skenderbeu from 1958 until 1963 and from 1961 he was managed by M. Prodani. He started every game for Skenderbeu and became a fan favourite.

=== Dinamo Tirana ===
In 1963, Pilika joined Dinamo Tirana, leaving in the summer of 1965. During his two seasons with Dinamo, his team achieved second and third place in the league. His manager was Xhevdet Shaqiri. Whilst at Dinamo, he took part in the 1963–64 Balkans Cup, his debut in the tournament, in which he played every game. Dinamo came third in Group A with their only win at home coming from a 2–0 victory over Besiktas in which Pilika scored the first goal of the game in the 5th minute. The game took place on 17 October 1963 at Selman Stermasi Stadium. In the summer of 1965, Pilika left Dinamo to return to KF Skenderbeu; there was no official transfer back nor did his contract expire, however he did not want to play for Dinamo anymore. He not play football for six months until KF Skenderbeu and Dinamo came to an agreement.

=== Return to KF Skenderbeu ===
Pilika played for KF Skenderbeu from 1965 to 1971 and was managed by M. Prodani once more until the summer of 1966, when Ilia Shuke became manager of the club. He retired from football in 1971 at the age of 31 years old, having become a club favourite and top goal scorer for the club in certain seasons.

== International career ==
From 1959 to 1963 he was selected for the Albania national team, however he never started a game due to personal political issues with the communist party of Albania.

== Retirement ==
Pilika retired from football at 31 years old. During his time at Skenderbeu and Dinamo, he did not win any silverware. From 1971 to 1973, he did not participate in any football-related activities. In 1974–1975, he started training to be a manager.

== Managerial career ==
=== KF Skenderbeu ===
In 1975, at 35 years of age, Pilika returned to football as the manager of KF Skenderbeu, after training to become a professional football manager. He replaced Ilia Shuke as manager of the team. Pilika joined Skenderbeu for the 1975–1976 season in Kategoria e Parë, the second division in the Albanian football league. In his first season, he took Skenderbeu to the final of the Albanian Cup. His team lost 4–1 on aggregate to 17 Nentori. Despite this, he guided his team to be champions of Kategoria e Pare, leading to promotion to Kategoria Superiore, the top flight of the Albanian football league.

In the team's first season in Kategoria Superiore, they came second in the league with 28 points, tied with Dinamo Tirana. In the final phase, where the top six teams compete against each other, they maintained second place behind Dinamo, with a total of 40 points. However in the 1977–78 Albanian National Championship they came last in the league with 18 points, leading to the team's relegation back into the Kategoria e pare.

=== Balkan Cup ===
Following the 1977–78 season, KF Skenderbeu qualified to compete in the 1977–78 Balkans Cup, the first time the club had competed in any European competition. They were in Group A alongside Aris Thessaloniki F.C. and HNK Rijeka, and under Pilika they beat both teams at home winning 1–0 against Rijeka (Rragami 66) and 2–0 against Aris (Xhambazi 16, Muhaxhiri 25). However they lost to both teams on the away leg, losing 6–0 to Rijeka and 2–0 to Aris. This left them second in the table and therefore not progressing further.

=== Resignation ===
Pilika resigned from KF Skenderbeu in 1978, being replaced by Kosta Koça. The team did not qualify for another European competition until 2015. All members of the team, including Pilika, were from the city of Korça, making them a symbol of regional pride in the city.

=== Short return ===
Pilika returned to manage KF Skenderbeu for the 1996-97 season of the Albanian National Championship. Following the team finishing 18th and last in the league with 14 points, he left once more under mutual agreement and retired from coaching.

== Personal life ==
Pilika married Miranda Vaso from Korça in 1966, the sister of Teodor Vaso, a fellow Albanian footballer. With Miranda he had three daughters; Gilda Pilika, Edlira Pilika and Berta Pilika. His sister Fedra Pilika married Agim Shuka, a famous actor in Albania. His nephew is Orli Shuka, a British-Albanian actor, son of Agim and Fedra. In 1990, he moved from Albania to the city of Thessaloniki in Greece. He has five grandchildren. His Y-DNA haplogroup is R-CTS1221 under the R1a branch.

== Honours ==
=== Player ===
Dinamo Tirana

- Albanian national championship runner-up: 1963–64

=== Manager ===
KF Skenderbeu

- Albanian national championship runner-up: 1976–77
- Albanian Cup finalist: 1975–76
- Promotion from Kategoria e Parë: 1975–76
