= 1952 Albanian National Championship =

Albanian National Championship
- Season: 1952
- Champions: Dinamo Tirana

The 1952 Albanian National Championship was the fifteenth season of the Albanian National Championship, the top professional league for association football clubs, since its establishment in 1930.

== Overview ==
It was contested by 21 teams, and Dinamo won the championship.

== Qualification round ==
=== Group A ===
Pos	Team	Pld	W	D	L	GF	GA	GR	Pts	Qualification or relegation	DIT	KOR	DUR	SSH	KAV	GJI	FIE
1	Dinamo Tirana (Q)	12	12	0	0	46	2	23.000	24	Qualification for the Final group		3–1	3–0	6–0	5–0	4–0	7–0
2	Puna Korçë	12	7	2	3	17	10	1.700	16	Qualification for the Final group	1–2		2–0	1–1	1–0	2–0	3–0
3	Puna Durrës	12	5	3	4	11	12	0.917	13		0–2	0–0		0–0	3–1	2–1	2–0
4	Spartaku Shkodër (R)	12	5	3	4	16	18	0.889	13	Relegation to the 1953 Kategoria e Dytë	0–2	2–1	0–0		6–0	2–1	2–0
5	Puna Kavajë (R)	12	4	2	6	16	22	0.727	10	Relegation to the 1953 Kategoria e Dytë	0–3	1–2	3–0	2–1		2–0	3–1
6	Puna Gjirokastër (R)	12	2	2	8	14	26	0.538	6	Relegation to the 1953 Kategoria e Dytë	0–3	0–1	1–2	5–1	1–1		3–0
7	Puna Fier (R)	12	0	2	10	4	34	0.118	2	Relegation to the 1953 Kategoria e Dytë	0–6	1–2	1–2	0–1	1–1	2–2	

Source: RSSSF.org, EU-Football.info
(Q) Qualified for the phase indicated; (R) Relegated

=== Group B ===
Pos	Team	Pld	W	D	L	GF	GA	GR	Pts	Qualification or relegation	PAR	SHK	VLO	BER	SKO	LUS	LEZ
1	Partizani (Q)	12	12	0	0	64	3	21.333	24	Qualification for the Final group		2–0	3–0	5–0	8–0	7–0	10–0
2	Puna Shkodër (Q)	12	9	0	3	46	7	6.571	18	Qualification for the Final group	1–2		7–0	5–0	6–0	4–0	6–0
3	Puna Vlorë	12	7	1	4	24	21	1.143	15		1–3	3–1		0–0	5–1	7–0	1–0
4	Puna Berat (R)	12	6	2	4	25	21	1.190	14	Relegation to the 1953 Kategoria e Dytë	1–4	0–2	5–0		4–1	5–0	3–1
5	Spartaku Korçë (R)	12	2	1	9	10	45	0.222	5	Relegation to the 1953 Kategoria e Dytë	0–6	0–6	1–2	1–3		3–1	2–1
6	Puna Lushnjë (R)	12	2	1	9	8	47	0.170	5	Relegation to the 1953 Kategoria e Dytë	0–6	0–5	0–4	1–3	2–0		2–1
7	Puna Lezhë (R)	12	0	3	9	7	40	0.175	3	Relegation to the 1953 Kategoria e Dytë	0–8	0–3	0–1	1–1	1–1	2–2	

Source: RSSSF.org, EU-Football.info
(Q) Qualified for the phase indicated; (R) Relegated

=== Group C ===
Pos	Team	Pld	W	D	L	GF	GA	GR	Pts	Qualification or relegation	TIR	DIV	LUF	SPO	ELB	SHI	SQS
1	Puna Tiranë (Q)	10	9	1	0	40	2	20.000	19	Qualification for the Final group		2–0	4–0	5–0	8–0	5–0	—
2	Dinamo Vlora (Q)	10	6	2	2	16	15	1.067	14	Qualification for the Final group	0–0		2–1	2–0	4–2	2–0	—
3	Luftëtari Sh.B.O. "Enver Hoxha"	10	5	1	4	15	10	1.500	11		0–2	6–0		2–1	4–0	1–0	—
4	Spartaku Pogradec	10	4	2	4	9	14	0.643	10		1–4	0–0	0–0		2–1	3–0	—
5	Puna Elbasan (R)	10	2	1	7	12	32	0.375	5	Relegation to the 1953 Kategoria e Dytë	1–6	3–4	1–0	0–1		3–3	—
6	Puna Shijak (R)	10	0	1	9	4	23	0.174	1	Relegation to the 1953 Kategoria e Dytë	0–4	1–2	0–1	0–1	0–1		—
7	Spartaku Qyteti Stalin (W)	0	0	0	0	0	0	—	0	Relegation to the 1953 Kategoria e Dytë	—	—	—	—	—	—	

Source: RSSSF.org, EU-Football.info
(Q) Qualified for the phase indicated; (R) Relegated; (W) Withdrew

== Final round ==
=== League table ===
Pos	Team	Pld	W	D	L	GF	GA	GR	Pts	Qualification or relegation	DIT	PAR	SHK	KOR	TIR	DIV
1	Dinamo Tirana (C)	10	7	2	1	28	4	7.000	16	Champions		2–1	5–0	5–0	1–0	8–0
2	Partizani	10	7	1	2	25	8	3.125	15		1–1		4–0	5–0	3–0	4–0
3	Puna Shkodër	10	5	2	3	21	20	1.050	12		0–1	4–1		2–1	4–3	5–1
4	Puna Korçë	10	2	4	4	7	16	0.438	8		0–0	0–1	1–1		2–0	0–0
5	Puna Tiranë	10	3	1	6	14	17	0.824	7		1–0	1–2	2–2	1–2		3–0
6	Dinamo Vlora	10	0	2	8	3	33	0.091	2	Relegation to the 1953 Kategoria e Dytë	0–4	0–3	0–2	1–1	1–3	

Source: RSSSF.org, CalcioMondialeWeb.it
(C) Champions
