= 1977–78 Kategoria e Dytë =

Kategoria e Dytë
- Season: 1977–78
- Champions: Besa
- Promoted: Besa; Besëlidhja; Naftëtari
- Relegated: None

The 1977–78 Kategoria e Dytë was the 32nd season of a second-tier association football league in Albania.

== Group A ==
Pos	Team	Pld	W	D	L	GF	GA	GD	Pts	Qualification
1	Naftëtari (P)	14	10	2	2	29	7	+22	22	Qualification to the Championship playoff
2	24 Maji	14	7	2	5	16	13	+3	16	Qualification to the Promotion playoff
3	Apolonia	14	5	4	5	12	13	−1	14	
4	Minatori (T)	14	6	2	6	17	21	−4	14	
5	Vetëtima	14	6	1	7	16	20	−4	13	
6	Ylli i Kuq	14	4	5	5	11	15	−4	13	
7	Butrinti	14	4	3	7	16	20	−4	11	
8	10 Korriku	14	3	3	8	12	20	−8	9	

(P) Promoted

== Group B ==
Pos	Team	Pld	W	D	L	GF	GA	GD	Pts	Qualification
1	Besa (C, P)	14	12	2	0	34	5	+29	26	Qualification to the Championship playoff
2	Besëlidhja (P)	14	11	2	1	26	9	+17	24	Qualification to the Promotion playoff
3	5 Shtatori	14	4	5	5	14	18	−4	13	
4	Erzeni	14	3	5	6	10	17	−7	11	
5	Dajti	14	2	6	6	9	14	−5	10	
6	31 Korriku	14	3	4	7	13	20	−7	10	
7	Sopoti	14	3	3	8	12	19	−7	9	
8	Përparimi	14	3	3	8	14	30	−16	9	

(C) Champions; (P) Promoted

== Championship playoff ==
Team 1	Agg.	Team 2	1st leg	2nd leg
Naftëtari	1–3	Besa	1–0	0–3

- The second leg which ended with a score of 3–0 for Besa was annulled, but the replay ended with a same score. And the Besa was promoted to the 1978–79 National Championship. Naftëtari was placed to the promotion playoffs.

== Promotion/relegation playoff ==
Team 1	Score	Team 2
Naftëtari	1–1	Skënderbeu
Besëlidhja	1–1	24 Maji
Naftëtari	2–1	24 Maji
Besëlidhja	3–0	Skënderbeu
Naftëtari	0–0	Besëlidhja
24 Maji	2–1	Skënderbeu

Pos	Team	Pld	W	D	L	GF	GA	GD	Pts	Promotion or relegation
1	Besëlidhja (P)	3	1	2	0	4	1	+3	4	Promotion to the 1978–79 National Championship
2	Naftëtari (P)	3	1	2	0	3	2	+1	4	Promotion to the 1978–79 National Championship
3	24 Maji	3	1	1	1	4	4	0	3	Remain in the 1978–79 Kategoria e Dytë
4	Skënderbeu (R)	3	0	1	2	2	6	−4	1	Relegation to the 1978–79 Kategoria e Dytë

(P) Promoted; (R) Relegated
