= 1979–80 Albanian National Championship =

Albanian National Championship
- Season: 1979–80
- Champions: Dinamo Tirana; 13th Albanian title
- Relegated: Shkëndija Tiranë; Apolonia
- European Cup: Dinamo Tirana
- UEFA Cup: None
- Cup Winners' Cup: Partizani
- Matches: 182
- Goals: 427 (2.35 per match)
- Top goalscorer: Përparim Kovaçi (18 goals)

The 1979–80 Albanian National Championship was the 41st season of the Albanian National Championship, the top professional league for association football clubs, since its establishment in 1930.

== Overview ==
It was contested by 14 teams, and Dinamo Tirana won the championship.

== League standings ==
Pos	Team	Pld	W	D	L	GF	GA	GD	Pts	Qualification or relegation
1	Dinamo Tirana (C)	26	14	9	3	41	23	+18	37	Qualification for the European Cup first round
2	17 Nëntori	26	11	10	5	33	27	+6	32	
3	Vllaznia	26	12	7	7	37	26	+11	31	
4	Partizani	26	9	11	6	41	30	+11	29	Qualification for the Cup Winners' Cup first round
5	Flamurtari	26	10	9	7	33	25	+8	29	
6	Skënderbeu	26	9	10	7	27	24	+3	28	
7	Luftëtari	26	11	5	10	39	35	+4	27	
8	Lokomotiva Durrës	26	8	11	7	29	27	+2	27	
9	Labinoti	26	7	13	6	27	25	+2	27	
10	Besa	26	9	8	9	27	29	−2	26	
11	Naftëtari	26	9	6	11	29	39	−10	24	
12	Tomori	26	7	9	10	31	37	−6	23	
13	Shkëndija Tiranë (R)	26	6	7	13	18	30	−12	19	Relegation to the 1980–81 Kategoria e Dytë
14	Apolonia (R)	26	0	5	21	15	50	−35	5	Relegation to the 1980–81 Kategoria e Dytë

Source: RSSSF.org
(C) Champions; (R) Relegated

Note: 'Lokomotiva Durrës' is Teuta, 'Labinoti' is Elbasani

== Results ==
Home \ Away	17N	APO	BES	DIN	FLA	LAB	LOK	LUF	NAF	PAR	SKË	SHK	TOM	VLL
17 Nëntori		2–0	2–2	0–1	1–0	1–0	2–0	1–0	1–1	3–2	2–2	2–1	2–1	2–1
Apolonia	0–2		0–1	1–1	1–3	1–1	0–1	2–3	0–1	0–1	1–1	1–1	0–1	0–2
Besa	3–0	2–1		3–3	1–1	1–1	2–1	4–2	1–0	1–0	0–0	1–0	1–1	0–1
Dinamo	5–4	4–1	1–0		1–0	0–0	0–0	2–3	0–0	2–2	2–0	2–0	5–1	1–0
Flamurtari	0–0	4–0	2–0	1–1		2–1	1–1	2–1	3–1	1–1	0–0	1–0	3–2	2–1
Labinoti	0–0	0–0	1–0	1–1	0–0		2–1	3–1	1–0	3–2	0–0	2–1	2–1	1–2
Lokomotiva	2–2	3–2	3–1	1–1	2–0	1–0		0–1	1–1	1–0	0–0	2–0	0–0	1–1
Luftëtari	1–1	4–0	0–1	0–1	2–1	2–2	2–1		4–2	1–0	1–0	1–1	0–0	0–0
Naftëtari	1–1	2–1	2–1	0–1	3–2	2–1	1–1	0–2		0–3	2–1	1–1	1–0	2–3
Partizani	1–1	2–0	2–0	3–0	2–1	0–0	1–1	5–1	0–1		2–2	2–1	5–2	1–1
Skënderbeu	1–0	2–0	2–1	0–1	0–0	1–1	2–1	3–2	1–2	1–1		2–1	2–1	2–0
Shkëndija	0–1	1–0	0–0	0–2	1–1	0–0	1–2	1–0	1–0	1–1	1–0		3–2	1–0
Tomori	0–0	2–1	0–0	1–3	1–2	2–2	3–1	1–0	3–2	0–0	1–0	3–0		1–1
Vllaznia	1–0	3–1	3–0	1–0	1–0	3–2	1–1	1–2	5–1	2–2	1–2	1–0	1–1	

Source: CalcioMondialeWeb.it
Legend: Blue = home team win; Yellow = draw; Red = away team win.

== Season statistics ==
=== Top scorers ===
Rank	Player	Club	Goals
1	(Albania) Përparim Kovaçi	Tomori	18
2	(Albania) Luan Seiti	Luftëtari	17
3	(Albania) Dashnor Bajaziti	Besa	13
4	(Albania) Edmond Gëzdari	17 Nëntori	10
