= 1977–78 Albanian National Championship =

Albanian National Championship
- Season: 1977–78
- Champions: Vllaznia; 5th Albanian title
- Relegated: Skënderbeu
- European Cup: Vllaznia
- UEFA Cup: None
- Cup Winners' Cup: None
- Matches: 132
- Goals: 265 (2.01 per match)
- Top goalscorer: Agim Murati (14 goals)

The 1977–78 Albanian National Championship was the 39th season of the Albanian National Championship, the top professional league for association football clubs, since its establishment in 1930.

== Overview ==
It was contested by 12 teams, and Vllaznia won the championship.

== League table ==
Pos	Team	Pld	W	D	L	GF	GA	GD	Pts	Qualification
1	Vllaznia (C)	22	10	9	3	32	19	+13	29	Qualification for the European Cup first round
2	Luftëtari	22	10	6	6	26	22	+4	26	
3	Partizani	22	11	3	8	30	22	+8	25	
4	Dinamo Tirana	22	8	8	6	24	20	+4	24	
5	Flamurtari	22	7	9	6	25	20	+5	23	
6	17 Nëntori	22	7	7	8	21	20	+1	21	
7	Tomori	22	7	7	8	24	29	−5	21	
8	Shkëndija Tiranë	22	6	9	7	18	23	−5	21	
9	Traktori	22	6	7	9	22	28	−6	19	
10	Lokomotiva Durrës	22	4	11	7	15	24	−9	19	
11	Labinoti	22	6	6	10	12	19	−7	18	
12	Skënderbeu (R)	22	6	6	10	16	19	−3	18	Qualification for the relegation play-offs (Note: Labinoti and Skënderbeu finished the season level on points so the Albanian Football Association decided to organise a playoff game to determine which side will be qualified to the relegation play-offs.)

Source: RSSSF.org
(C) Champions; (R) Relegated
Notes:

Note: '17 Nëntori' is Tirana, 'Traktori' is Lushnja, 'Lokomotiva Durrës' is Teuta, 'Labinoti' is Elbasani

== Results ==
Home \ Away	17N	DIN	FLA	LAB	LOK	LUF	PAR	SKË	SHK	TOM	TRA	VLL
17 Nëntori		1–0	1–1	1–1	2–1	0–1	1–0	0–0	3–0	3–0	0–2	2–0
Dinamo	0–0		1–1	0–1	0–0	2–3	1–2	2–1	1–1	0–0	5–1	1–1
Flamurtari	0–2	0–2		2–1	0–0	3–2	1–0	1–0	0–0	3–1	3–0	3–0
Labinoti	1–0	0–1	0–0		1–1	1–2	2–1	0–0	1–0	1–0	1–0	0–1
Lokomotiva	0–0	1–1	0–0	1–0		1–1	1–0	2–0	1–2	2–2	1–0	0–0
Luftëtari	1–0	0–1	2–1	2–0	2–0		0–1	2–0	0–0	1–1	1–0	1–1
Partizani	3–1	2–0	2–1	3–1	4–1	0–1		3–2	1–0	3–2	1–1	0–1
Skënderbeu	1–0	0–2	1–1	0–0	4–0	2–0	2–0		1–0	0–0	2–0	0–1
Shkëndija	1–1	1–2	0–0	1–0	1–1	2–0	0–0	1–0		2–1	2–1	1–1
Tomori	3–0	1–1	2–1	1–0	1–0	4–3	1–0	0–0	2–1		2–3	0–0
Traktori	1–1	0–1	1–1	2–0	3–1	1–1	1–1	1–0	1–1	1–0		1–2
Vllaznia	3–2	3–0	3–2	0–0	0–0	1–1	1–3	3–0	5–1	4–0	1–1	

Source: CalcioMondialeWeb.it
Legend: Blue = home team win; Yellow = draw; Red = away team win.

== 11th place playoff ==
Team 1	Agg.	Team 2	1st leg	2nd leg
Labinoti	0–0 (6–5 p)	Skënderbeu	0–0	0–0

- Skënderbeu were qualified to the relegation play-offs.

== Relegation/promotion playoff ==
Team 1	Score	Team 2
Naftëtari	1–1	Skënderbeu
Besëlidhja	1–1	24 Maji
Naftëtari	2–1	24 Maji
Besëlidhja	3–0	Skënderbeu
Naftëtari	0–0	Besëlidhja
24 Maji	2–1	Skënderbeu

Pos	Team	Pld	W	D	L	GF	GA	GD	Pts	Promotion or relegation
1	Besëlidhja (P)	3	1	2	0	4	1	+3	4	Promotion to the 1978–79 National Championship
2	Naftëtari (P)	3	1	2	0	3	2	+1	4	Promotion to the 1978–79 National Championship
3	24 Maji	3	1	1	1	4	4	0	3	Remain in the 1978–79 Kategoria e Dytë
4	Skënderbeu (R)	3	0	1	2	2	6	−4	1	Relegation to the 1978–79 Kategoria e Dytë

Source: RSSSF.org
(P) Promoted; (R) Relegated
