= 1980–81 Albanian National Championship =

Albanian National Championship
- Season: 1980–81
- Champions: Partizani; 13th Albanian title
- Relegated: Skënderbeu; Traktori
- European Cup: Partizani
- UEFA Cup: Dinamo Tirana
- Cup Winners' Cup: None
- Matches: 182
- Goals: 355 (1.95 per match)
- Top goalscorer: Dashnor Bajaziti (12 goals)

The 1980–81 Albanian National Championship was the 42nd season of the Albanian National Championship, the top professional league for association football clubs, since its establishment in 1930.

== Overview ==
It was contested by 14 teams, and Partizani won the championship.

== League table ==
Pos	Team	Pld	W	D	L	GF	GA	GD	Pts	Qualification or relegation
1	Partizani (C)	26	15	7	4	36	17	+19	37	Qualification for the European Cup first round
2	Dinamo Tirana	26	14	8	4	32	17	+15	36	Qualification for the UEFA Cup first round
3	17 Nëntori	26	14	7	5	38	21	+17	35	
4	Vllaznia	26	9	9	8	30	33	−3	27	
5	Luftëtari	26	10	5	11	25	24	+1	25	
6	Naftëtari	26	10	5	11	24	32	−8	25	
7	Besa	26	7	10	9	28	25	+3	24	
8	Flamurtari	26	8	8	10	27	26	+1	24	
9	Labinoti	26	7	10	9	24	28	−4	24	
10	Besëlidhja	26	6	11	9	21	25	−4	23	
11	Lokomotiva Durrës	26	6	11	9	20	24	−4	23	
12	Tomori	26	4	15	7	14	20	−6	23	
13	Skënderbeu (R)	26	5	12	9	19	27	−8	22	Relegation to the 1981–82 Kategoria e Dytë
14	Traktori (R)	26	4	8	14	17	36	−19	16	Relegation to the 1981–82 Kategoria e Dytë

Source: RSSSF.org
(C) Champions; (R) Relegated

Note: "17 Nëntori" is Tirana, "Labinoti" is Elbasani, "Lokomotiva Durrës" is Teuta and "Traktori" is Lushnja.

== Results ==
Home \ Away	17N	BES	BSL	DIN	FLA	LAB	LOK	LUF	NAF	PAR	SKË	TOM	TRA	VLL
17 Nëntori		2–0	2–1	3–2	3–0	2–0	2–1	1–0	4–1	2–1	1–1	1–0	0–0	3–0
Besa	0–2		0–0	1–1	2–2	5–0	2–0	1–0	3–0	0–1	3–1	0–0	1–0	0–0
Besëlidhja	1–1	0–0		0–0	1–1	1–2	1–1	1–1	1–0	0–0	1–0	2–1	2–1	3–0
Dinamo	1–0	3–1	1–0		2–1	2–0	0–0	2–1	4–2	0–0	1–0	3–1	2–0	1–1
Flamurtari	1–2	2–2	2–0	0–0		2–0	0–0	2–0	1–0	0–1	2–0	2–0	3–0	1–1
Labinoti	0–0	0–1	3–0	1–2	1–1		2–2	2–0	0–0	1–0	2–1	1–1	1–0	3–0
Lokomotiva	1–1	1–0	0–0	1–0	2–0	0–0		0–0	0–1	1–1	0–0	1–0	2–1	1–1
Luftëtari	2–0	2–1	2–1	3–2	1–0	1–0	2–1		2–0	0–1		3–0	0–0	0–1
Naftëtari	0–1	1–0	0–1	0–2	2–1	0–0	1–0	2–1		1–0	2–1	1–1	3–0	3–0
Partizani	3–2	2–1	1–0	0–1	2–0	2–1	2–1	1–0	4–1		1–1	0–0	5–0	3–1
Skënderbeu	2–1	2–2	2–1	0–0	1–0	1–1	2–1	1–0	0–0	1–1		1–1	0–0	0–0
Tomori	1–1	0–0	0–0	0–1	0–0	1–0	2–1	0–0	0–0	1–1	1–0		1–1	2–0
Traktori	1–1	1–0	1–1	1–0	1–3	1–1	1–2	0–1	2–3	0–1	2–0	0–0		1–0
Vllaznia	1–0	2–2	3–2	0–0	2–0	2–2	2–0	4–2	3–0	1–2	2–0	0–0	3–2	

Source: CalcioMondialeWeb.it
Legend: Blue = home team win; Yellow = draw; Red = away team win.

== Season statistics ==
=== Top scorers ===
Rank	Player	Club	Goals
1	(Albania) Dashnor Bajaziti	Besa	12
2	(Albania) Vasillaq Zëri	Dinamo Tirana	10
3	(Albania) Roland Luçi	Vllaznia	8
3	(Albania) Aleko Bregu	Dinamo Tirana	8
3	(Albania) Musa Fagu	Partizani	8
6	(Albania) Vladimir Skuro	Naftëtari	7
6	(Albania) Agim Murati	Partizani	7
