= 1978–79 Albanian National Championship =

Albanian National Championship
- Season: 1978–79
- Champions: Partizani; 12th Albanian title
- Relegated: Besëlidhja; Traktori
- European Cup: Partizani
- UEFA Cup: None
- Cup Winners' Cup: Vllaznia
- Matches: 182
- Goals: 388 (2.13 per match)
- Top goalscorer: Agim Murati; Petrit Dibra (12 goals)

The 1978–79 Albanian National Championship was the 40th season of the Albanian National Championship, the top professional league for association football clubs, since its establishment in 1930.

== Overview ==
It was contested by 14 teams, and Partizani won the championship.

== League table ==
Pos	Team	Pld	W	D	L	GF	GA	GD	Pts	Qualification or relegation
1	Partizani (C)	26	14	8	4	38	20	+18	36	Qualification for the European Cup first round
2	17 Nëntori	26	13	9	4	41	27	+14	35	
3	Besa	26	11	9	6	36	25	+11	31	
4	Flamurtari	26	11	8	7	25	20	+5	30	
5	Dinamo Tirana	26	8	13	5	35	24	+11	29	
6	Labinoti	26	10	8	8	25	22	+3	28	
7	Lokomotiva Durrës	26	6	13	7	30	29	+1	25	
8	Tomori	26	7	11	8	21	21	0	25	
9	Vllaznia	26	8	7	11	37	33	+4	23	Qualification for the Cup Winners' Cup first round
10	Naftëtari	26	6	11	9	21	36	−15	23	
11	Shkëndija Tiranë	26	5	11	10	20	29	−9	21	
12	Luftëtari	26	8	5	13	21	32	−11	21	
13	Besëlidhja (R)	26	10	0	16	19	38	−19	20	Relegation to the 1979–80 Kategoria e Dytë
14	Traktori (R)	26	3	11	12	19	32	−13	17	Relegation to the 1979–80 Kategoria e Dytë

Source: RSSSF.org
(C) Champions; (R) Relegated

Note: '17 Nëntori' is Tirana, 'Labinoti' is Elbasani, 'Lokomotiva Durrës' is Teuta, 'Traktori' is Lushnja

== Results ==
Home \ Away	17N	BES	BSL	DIN	FLA	LAB	LOK	LUF	NAF	PAR	SHK	TOM	TRA	VLL
17 Nëntori		2–1	1–0	1–1	2–1	1–0	1–0	2–0	5–2	2–2	2–0	1–0	3–1	3–1
Besa	0–0		2–0	1–1	3–1	3–2	1–1	6–0	1–1	2–0	2–0	2–0	1–0	1–0
Besëlidhja	3–4	1–2		0–1	1–0	1–0	1–0	1–0	1–0	1–2	1–0	1–0	1–0	0–3
Dinamo	2–2	2–0	3–0		2–0	1–1	2–2	0–0	5–0	0–2	4–2	1–0	1–1	2–0
Flamurtari	1–1	1–0	1–0	1–0		0–0	1–0	1–0	3–0	2–1	2–0	1–1	2–1	3–1
Labinoti	3–2	1–1	2–0	1–0	2–1		2–1	1–0	1–0	1–0	2–2	0–0	1–0	2–1
Lokomotiva	3–0	2–0	1–2	1–1	0–0	1–0		2–0	2–2	2–1	0–0	2–1	1–1	3–4
Luftëtari	0–2	3–1	3–0	1–1	1–0	0–0	1–1		2–0	0–0	1–0	1–0	2–0	1–0
Naftëtari	0–0	1–1	3–2	0–0	0–0	2–1	1–1	2–1		0–0	2–1	1–1	2–1	1–0
Partizani	1–0	3–1	3–1	2–2	2–0	1–1	1–1	2–1	2–0		2–0	0–0	3–0	2–0
Shkëndija	0–0	0–1	1–0	3–1	1–1	1–0	2–2	2–1	1–0	0–1		0–0	0–0	1–1
Tomori	2–1	0–0	1–0	0–0	1–1	1–0	1–1	2–1	0–0	2–3	1–1		2–0	2–3
Traktori	2–2	2–2	0–1	1–1	0–1	1–0	0–0	3–0	1–1	0–0	1–1	0–2		2–1
Vllaznia	1–1	1–1	5–0	2–1	0–0	1–1	3–0	3–1	3–0	1–2	1–1	0–1	1–1	

Source: CalcioMondialeWeb.it
Legend: Blue = home team win; Yellow = draw; Red = away team win.

== Season statistics ==
=== Top scorers ===
Rank	Player	Club	Goals
1	(Albania) Petrit Dibra	17 Nëntori	14
1	(Albania) Agim Murati	Partizani	14
3	(Albania) Ferdinand Lleshi	Labinoti	13
4	(Albania) Ilir Pernaska	Dinamo Tirana	12
5	(Albania) Shtini	Besa	11
5	(Albania) Dashnor Bajaziti	Besa	11
5	(Albania) Vladimir Skuro	Naftëtari	11
5	(Albania) Hima	Lokomotiva Durrës	11
