= Haki (name) =

- Gender: Male

Origin
- Region of origin: Albania

Haki is an Albanian masculine given name. People with the name Haki include:

- Haki Demolli (born 1963), Kosovar professor and politician
- Haki Doku (born 1969), Albanian para-cyclist
- Haki Korça (c. 1916–2006), Albanian footballer
- Haki Madhubuti (born 1942), American author, educator, and poet
- Haki Stërmilli (1895–1953), Albanian writer and journalist
- Haki Toska (1920–1994), Albanian politician
- Haki Xhakli (born 1952), Kosovar painter and professor
