= Qemal Omari =

Turkish footballer and manager (born 1928)

Personal information
- Full name: Qemal Omari
- Place of birth: Istanbul, Turkey, (then Ottoman Empire)
- Position: Midfielder

Senior career*
| Years | Team | Apps | (Gls) |
| 1926–1931 | İstanbulspor | | |

International career
- Turkey

Managerial career
- 1932–1938: Skënderbeu Korçë
- * Club domestic league appearances and goals

Qemal Omari (born 1902) (in Turkey was known as Kemal Halim Gürgen) was a Turkish football player, manager, and referee of Albanian heritage.

He was a founding member of İstanbulspor A.Ş. in 1926, and he played for the club before retiring and becoming a referee and the general secretary of the Istanbul Football League. In 1932, he notably refereed the game between Galatasaray and Fenerbahçe before moving to Albania to become the manager of Skënderbeu Korçë.

== Skënderbeu ==
In the early 1930s, King Zog of Albania had wanted foreign players and coaches to come to the country in order to raise the profile of football and increase standards, and Omari was invited by representatives of King Zog to Albania along with Servet Teufik Agaj, both of whom were ethnic Albanians living in Turkey. Both Omari and Agaj were to head to Korçë to join the Skënderbeu. It is not known why they chose Skënderbeu, but some have suggested that Omari's parents may have originally been from Korçë but had emigrated to Turkey during the Ottoman era. Agaj was born in Gora, Korçë, but had been living in Turkey for a number of years before returning in 1931, one year before himself and Omari joined Skënderbeu. It has been suggested that Omari chose to go to Korçë on the recommendation of Agaj.

Omari won the 1933 Albanian Championship with Skënderbeu after finishing fourth in his first season. In the title-winning season, Servet Teufik Agaj scored seven league goals and was named the top scorer. Both the player and coach remained at the club until 1938, when they returned to Turkey.
