= 1979–80 Kategoria e Dytë =

Kategoria e Dytë
- Season: 1979–80
- Champions: Besëlidhja
- Promoted: Besëlidhja; Traktori
- Relegated: Minatori (T); Punëtori; Erzeni; 10 Korriku

The 1979–80 Kategoria e Dytë was the 34th season of a second-tier association football league in Albania.

== Group A ==
Pos	Team	Pld	W	D	L	GF	GA	GD	Pts	Promotion or relegation
1	Traktori (P)	14	9	4	1	27	9	+18	22	Promotion to 1980–81 National Championship
2	Vetëtima	14	6	4	4	16	14	+2	16	
3	24 Maji	14	4	6	4	11	17	−6	14	
4	Ylli i Kuq	14	5	3	6	18	16	+2	13	
5	Sopoti	14	2	9	3	19	19	0	13	
6	5 Shtatori	14	6	1	7	14	18	−4	13	
7	Minatori (T) (R)	14	4	4	6	12	13	−1	12	Relegation to 1980–81 Kategoria e Tretë
8	Punëtori (R)	14	2	5	7	9	20	−11	9	Relegation to 1980–81 Kategoria e Tretë

(P) Promoted; (R) Relegated

== Group B ==
Pos	Team	Pld	W	D	L	GF	GA	GD	Pts	Promotion or relegation
1	Besëlidhja (C, P)	14	9	4	1	20	7	+13	22	Promotion to 1980–81 National Championship
2	Dajti	14	8	4	2	21	9	+12	20	
3	Kastrioti	14	5	3	6	13	13	0	13	
4	31 Korriku	14	4	5	5	12	14	−2	13	
5	Përparimi	14	5	2	7	12	14	−2	12	
6	Shkumbini	14	4	4	6	8	12	−4	12	
7	Erzeni (R)	14	4	3	7	17	20	−3	11	Relegation to 1980–81 Kategoria e Tretë
8	10 Korriku (R)	14	3	3	8	5	19	−14	9	Relegation to 1980–81 Kategoria e Tretë

(C) Champions; (P) Promoted; (R) Relegated

== Championship final ==
Team 1	Score	Team 2
Besëlidhja	2–0	Traktori
