= 1953 Kategoria e Dytë =

Kategoria e Dytë
- Season: 1953
- Champions: Spartaku Tiranë
- Promoted: Spartaku Tiranë; Puna Elbasan; Puna Kavajë

The 1953 Kategoria e Dytë was the 9th season of a second-tier association football league in Albania. The season started in March and ended in August. After the interruption of 1952 the Second Division resumed with the formula of the 14 teams in two groups and the final by title and promotions between the two first classified. Spartaku Tiranë wins the title and promotion, but thanks to the Federation's decision to enlarge the First Division to 12 teams, Puna Elbasan also gains promotion, although defeated in the play-off by the penultimate of the major series, and Puna Kavajë, who wins a special play-off with the second in the other group.

== Group A ==
Pos	Team	Pld	W	D	L	GF	GA	GR	Pts	Qualification
1	Puna Elbasan (Q)	12	8	3	1	31	19	1.632	19	Qualification to the final
2	Puna Kavajë	12	8	2	2	0	0	—	18	Play-off promotion to 1954 National Championship
3	Tekstilisti "Stalin" Yzberish	12	6	2	4	0	0	—	14	
4	Dinamo Shkodër	12	5	4	3	0	0	—	14	
5	Spartaku Shkodër	12	5	4	3	0	0	—	14	
6	Puna Shijak	12	2	1	9	0	0	—	5	
7	Puna Lezhë	12	0	0	12	0	0	—	0	

(Q) Qualified for the phase indicated

== Group B ==
Pos	Team	Pld	W	D	L	GF	GA	GR	Pts	Qualification
1	Spartaku Tiranë (Q)	12	10	1	1	0	0	—	21	Qualification to the final
2	Puna Berat	12	5	4	3	21	18	1.167	14	Play-off promotion to 1954 National Championship
3	Puna Fier	12	6	1	5	0	0	—	13	
4	Puna Lushnjë	12	4	5	3	0	0	—	13	
5	Puna Gjirokastër	12	3	2	7	0	0	—	8	
6	Spartaku Qyteti Stalin	12	2	4	6	0	0	—	8	
7	Spartaku Korçë	12	1	5	6	0	0	—	7	

(Q) Qualified for the phase indicated

== Final ==
Single match played in Kavajë.

Team 1	Score	Team 2
Spartaku Tiranë	6–1 (Note: according to some sources the result was 1-0.)	Puna Elbasan

== Promotion playoffs ==
The second-place finishers in the groups played in two match promotion playoffs.

Team 1	Agg.	Team 2	1st leg	2nd leg
Puna Kavajë	5–3	Puna Berat	1–2	4–1

- Spartaku Tiranë, Puna Elbasan and Puna Kavajë were promoted to 1954 National Championship.
