= 1976–77 Albanian National Championship =

Albanian National Championship
- Season: 1976–77
- Champions: Dinamo Tirana; 12th Albanian title
- Relegated: Besa
- European Cup: None
- UEFA Cup: None
- Cup Winners' Cup: None
- Matches: 192
- Goals: 364 (1.9 per match)
- Top goalscorer: Agim Murati (12 goals)

The 1976–77 Albanian National Championship was the 38th season of the Albanian National Championship, the top professional league for association football clubs, since its establishment in 1930.

== Overview ==
It was contested by 12 teams, and Dinamo Tirana won the championship.

== First phase ==
=== League table ===
Pos	Team	Pld	W	D	L	GF	GA	GD	Pts	Qualification
1	Dinamo Tirana	22	10	8	4	31	16	+15	28	Qualification for the Championship round
2	Skënderbeu	22	10	8	4	25	16	+9	28	Qualification for the Championship round
3	Vllaznia	22	11	5	6	34	23	+11	27	Qualification for the Championship round
4	Partizani	22	8	10	4	24	15	+9	26	Qualification for the Championship round
5	Lokomotiva Durrës	22	7	9	6	20	17	+3	23	Qualification for the Championship round
6	17 Nëntori	22	10	3	9	21	22	−1	23	Qualification for the Championship round
7	Traktori	22	8	7	7	17	21	−4	23	Qualification for the Relegation round
8	Labinoti	22	6	8	8	19	19	0	20	Qualification for the Relegation round
9	Luftëtari	22	6	6	10	19	26	−7	18	Qualification for the Relegation round
10	Flamurtari	22	6	5	11	20	31	−11	17	Qualification for the Relegation round
11	Besa	22	4	9	9	12	23	−11	17	Qualification for the Relegation round
12	Shkëndija Tiranë	22	4	6	12	11	24	−13	14	Qualification for the Relegation round

Source: RSSSF.org

=== Results ===
Home \ Away	17N	BES	DIN	FLA	LAB	LOK	LUF	PAR	SKË	SHK	TRA	VLL
17 Nëntori		0–0	2–1	2–1	2–1	1–0	3–1	3–1	0–1	1–0	1–2	1–0
Besa	0–0		0–1	1–0	0–0	1–1	1–1	1–0	1–1	1–0	1–1	1–1
Dinamo	1–0	1–0		3–1	1–1	0–0	5–1	1–1	1–1	4–0	3–0	3–2
Flamurtari	1–0	3–0	2–2		1–0	0–0	1–1	2–2	0–1	1–0	2–0	2–1
Labinoti	0–1	3–0	1–0	2–0		1–0	2–1	1–1	0–0	1–0	0–0	1–1
Lokomotiva	1–0	1–0	1–1	2–0	1–0		3–1	1–1	1–2	2–0	1–1	1–0
Luftëtari	3–0	2–0	0–1	2–1	0–0	2–1		0–0	1–1	0–1	1–0	1–0
Partizani	2–0	2–0	0–0	1–1	1–0	0–0	3–1		0–0	2–0	2–0	3–1
Skënderbeu	2–0	1–1	1–0	2–0	4–3	2–0	1–0	1–0		0–0	0–0	1–2
Shkëndija	1–2	2–3	0–1	1–0	1–1	1–0	0–0	0–0	1–0		0–0	1–1
Traktori	2–2	1–0	1–0	2–1	1–0	2–1	0–0	1–2	1–0	2–1		0–1
Vllaznia	1–0	1–0	1–1	6–0	3–1	2–2	1–0	1–0	4–3	2–1	2–0	

Source: CalcioMondialeWeb.it
Legend: Blue = home team win; Yellow = draw; Red = away team win.

== Final phase ==
=== Championship round ===
Pos	Team	Pld	W	D	L	GF	GA	GD	Pts
1	Dinamo Tirana (C)	32	16	12	4	46	24	+22	44
2	Skënderbeu	32	14	12	6	33	22	+11	40
3	Vllaznia	32	15	7	10	48	34	+14	37
4	Partizani	32	10	13	9	32	27	+5	33
5	17 Nëntori	32	14	5	13	31	31	0	33
6	Lokomotiva Durrës	32	9	10	13	27	33	−6	28

Source: RSSSF.org
(C) Champions

==== Results ====
Home \ Away	17N	DIN	LOK	PAR	SKË	VLL
17 Nëntori		1–1	2–0	0–0	2–1	1–2
Dinamo	2–1		2–1	1–0	0–0	1–0
Lokomotiva	0–1	2–4		2–1	1–0	0–0
Partizani	0–2	1–2	1–0		2–2	1–0
Skënderbeu	1–0	0–0	1–0	0–0		2–1
Vllaznia	2–0	2–2	4–1	3–2	0–1	

Source: CalcioMondialeWeb.it
Legend: Blue = home team win; Yellow = draw; Red = away team win.

=== Relegation round ===
Pos	Team	Pld	W	D	L	GF	GA	GD	Pts	Relegation
7	Luftëtari	32	9	11	12	29	32	−3	29	
8	Labinoti	32	9	11	12	25	29	−4	29	
9	Flamurtari	32	9	11	12	36	41	−5	29	
10	Traktori	32	9	11	12	23	33	−10	29	
11	Shkëndija Tiranë	32	8	11	13	19	29	−10	27	
12	Besa (R)	32	6	14	12	16	30	−14	26	Relegation to the 1977–78 Kategoria e Dytë

Source: RSSSF.org
(R) Relegated

Note: '17 Nëntori' is Tirana, 'Lokomotiva Durrës' is Teuta, 'Labinoti' is Elbasani, 'Traktori' is Lushnja

==== Results ====
Home \ Away	BES	FLA	LAB	LUF	SHK	TRA
Besa		2–1	0–1	0–0	0–0	0–0
Flamurtari	0–0		3–0	1–1	2–0	3–1
Labinoti	1–0	1–1		1–2	0–0	1–0
Luftëtari	2–0	1–1	2–0		0–0	1–1
Shkëndija	1–1	2–2	1–0	1–0		2–0
Traktori	0–1	2–2	1–1	1–0	0–1	

Source: CalcioMondialeWeb.it
Legend: Blue = home team win; Yellow = draw; Red = away team win.
