= 1933 Albanian National Championship =

Soccer tournament

Albanian National Championship
- Season: 1933
- Champions: Skënderbeu

The 1933 Albanian National Championship was the fourth season of the Albanian National Championship, the top professional league for association football clubs.

== Overview ==
The 1933 Albanian Superliga was contested by 5 teams, and Skënderbeu won the championship.

== League standings ==
Pos	Team	Pld	W	D	L	GF	GA	GR	Pts
1	Skënderbeu (C)	8	5	2	1	18	6	3.000	12
2	Bashkimi Shkodran	8	5	0	3	14	9	1.556	10
3	Teuta	8	3	2	3	12	10	1.200	8
4	Tirana	8	3	2	3	14	12	1.167	8
5	Kavaja	8	1	0	7	5	26	0.192	2

Source: RSSSF.org
Rules for classification: 1) points; 2) goal difference; 3) number of goals scored.
(C) Champions

== Results ==
Home \ Away	BAS	KAV	SKË	TEU	TIR
Bashkimi Shkodran		3–0	1–3	2–1	1–0
Kavaja	0–3		0–1	2–1	1–3
Skënderbeu	2–1	9–1		0–0	2–0
Teuta	1–0	2–0	3–1		2–3
Tirana	2–3	4–1	0–0	2–2	

Source: RSSSF.org
Legend: Blue = home team win; Yellow = draw; Red = away team win.

== Winning team of Skënderbeu ==
Klani Marjani, Kristaq Bimbli, Andrea Çani, Andon Miti, Lefter Petra, Fori Stassa, Nexhat Dishnica, Tomor Ypi, Thoma Vangjeli, Servet Teufik Agaj, Enver Kulla, Vasil Trebicka, Stavri Kondili, Aristotel Samsuri
COACH: Qemal Omari
Servet Teufik Agaj was the top-scorer with 7 goals.
