= Polenë =

- Village
- Location within Albania
- Coordinates: 40°29′30″N 20°16′50″E
- Country: Albania
- County: Berat
- Municipality: Skrapar
- Administrative unit: Qendër Skrapar
- Time zone: UTC+1 (CET)
  - Summer (DST): UTC+2 (CEST)

Polenë (Polena) is a village in the former municipality of Qendër Skrapar in Berat County, Albania. At the 2015 local government reform it became part of the municipality Skrapar. Aleko Pilika, former footballer and football manager has roots from this village from his mother.

== __LEAD_SECTION__ ==
Polena is a village in Korçë County, in Southeast Albania.
