= Ramadan Shehu =

Albanian football coach and director

Personal information
- Full name: Ramadan Shehu
- Date of birth: 14 July 1948 (age 78)
- Place of birth: Tirana, Albania
- Position: Defender

Managerial career
- Years: Team
- 1995–1996: Partizani
- 1997–1998: Tirana
- 1999–2000: Shkumbini
- 2001: Besa
- 2001–2002: Shkumbini
- 2002–2003: Besa
- 2003: Vllaznia
- 2004: Partizani
- Flamurtari
- 2007–2010: Albania U19
- 2009: Elbasani
- 2012: Laçi
- 2013: Besa

Ramadan Shehu (born 14 July 1948) is an Albanian football coach and director, whose last role in football was as the technical director of Kukësi in the Albanian Superliga.
