= Jani Kaçi =

Albanian footballer and coach

Personal information
- Full name: Jani Kaçi
- Date of birth: 17 August 1952 (age 74)
- Place of birth: Korçë, PR Albania
- Height: 1.86 m (6 ft 1 in)
- Position: Goalkeeper

Team information
- Current team: Skënderbeu; Goalkeeping coach

Youth career
- 1965–1969: Skënderbeu

Senior career*
| Years | Team | Apps | (Gls) |
| 1969–1972 | Skënderbeu | | |
| 1972 | Labinoti | | |
| 1973–1975 | Partizani | | |
| 1976–1985 | Skënderbeu | | |

International career^{‡}
| 1972–1976 | Albania U-21 | 20 | (0) |
| 1976–1981 | Albania | 6 | (0) |

Managerial career
- 1985–1987: Skënderbeu (youth)
- 1987–1995: Skënderbeu
- 1996: Skënderbeu
- 1997–1999: Pindos
- 2000–2001: Gramozi
- 2001: Skënderbeu
- 2006–2007: Skënderbeu
- 2008–2009: Skënderbeu (goalkeeping)
- 2014–: Skënderbeu (U-19)
- * Club domestic league appearances and goals ‡ National team caps and goals as of 23 September 2011

Jani Kaçi (born 17 August 1952 in Korçë) is a retired Albanian professional footballer. He played in goal for Skënderbeu Korçë in the 70s and 80s as well as the Albania national team, earning himself 6 full senior caps. He is widely considered to be one of Skënderbeu Korçë's best ever goalkeepers.

== Playing career ==
=== Club ===
Born in Korçë on 17 August 1952 to an ethnic Eastern Orthodox Greek father and Albanian mother, Kaçi joined his local side Skënderbeu Korçë as a 13-year-old where he became a goalkeeper due to his height. He joined the under–19s in 1967, at the age of just 15, and made his senior debut just two years later in an Albanian Cup game against Besëlidhja Lezhë. In 1972, he interrupted his studies at the High Agricultural Institute of Korçë to complete his military service, with the home of joining the military side Partizani. He was sent to an artillery unit in Elbasan and forced to join Labinoti Elbasan instead as Partizani was on a tour of China at the time. He played for Elbasan in 1972, when he was spotted by military commander Petrit Dume in a match against Partizani which Elbasani won 3–0; Dume then insisted in Partizani coach Loro Boriçi bringing him back to the club, which he subsequently joined in January 1973. He returned to Skënderbeu in January 1976 and quit football prematurely in 1985, aged 32, after the communist leaders in Korça harassed him due to his father being from Greek origin. Also, he was accused of tearing apart a photo of communist leader Enver Hoxha while he was with Partizani.

=== International ===
He made his debut for Albania in a November 1976 friendly match against Algeria and earned a total of 6 caps, scoring no goals. His final international was an April 1981 FIFA World Cup qualification match against West Germany.

== Managerial career ==
He has also managed Skënderbeu Korçë and won the 2006-07 Albanian First Division with the club. In February 2010 he was named as assistant manager under Mirel Josa at Skënderbeu, a position which he filled until the manager's departure at the end of the 2009–10 season. He has since returned to his post as the goalkeeping coach of Skënderbeu. In recent years he has also been goalkeeping coach of the Albania U-21 national team.

== Honours ==
=== Managerial ===
Skënderbeu Korçë

- Albanian First Division (1): 2006-07
