= Petrit Dibra =

Albanian former footballer

Personal information
- Date of birth: September 15, 1953 (age 73)
- Place of birth: Tirana, Albania
- Position: Forward

Youth career
- –1968: Pallati i Pionerëve
- 1968–1970: 17 Nëntori Tirana

Senior career*
| Years | Team | Apps | (Gls) |
| 1970–1980 | 17 Nëntori Tirana | 187 | (70) |
| Total | | 187 | (70) |

International career
| 1976 | Albania U-23 | 1 | (0) |
- * Club domestic league appearances and goals

Petrit Dibra (born 15 September 1953) is an Albanian former footballer who spent his entire career at his hometown club 17 Nëntori Tirana (present day KF Tirana) as a forward.

== Club career ==
=== Early career ===
Dibra was born in Tirana into an intellectual family as the only brother among three sisters, and attended the Alqi Kondi School before enrolling at the Qemal Stafa High School. While at the Alqi Kondi School he was a successful athlete, competing in the 60m and 100m where he was schoolboy champion at the time. He began playing football near his home where former 17 Nëntori Tirana player Aurel Verria would train youngsters. He was also a member of the Pallati i Pionerëve team that won the Durrës pioneers tournament under the guidance of coach Osman Reçi. At the age of 15 he rejoined 17 Nëntori Tirana's youth team, where the coach Xhavit Demneri recognised Dibra's pace and played him on the right wing and up front.

=== 17 Nëntori ===
Dibra first joined the senior side in 1970 following a traditional preseason internal friendly between the 17 Nëntori first team and youth team, in which Dibra scored twice to win the game for the youth team. After the game the 17-year-old was told by the first team coach Myslym Alla to bring his boots for the season opener against Tomori Berat, where he came on in the second half to make his debut following an injury to Ali Mema. He became the Kategoria Superiore's top goalscorer alongside Agim Murati in 1979, both scoring 14 goals.
