= Agim Murati =

Albanian footballer (1953–2005)

Personal information
- Full name: Agim Hysen Murati
- Date of birth: 8 March 1953
- Place of birth: Shijak, Durrës County, Albania
- Date of death: 15 September 2005 (aged 52)
- Position: Striker

Youth career
- 1967–1970: Erzeni
- 1970–1973: Partizani Tirana

Senior career*
Years	Team	Apps	(Gls)
1973–1983	Partizani Tirana		(40+)

International career
1973–1976	Albania	3	(0)

Managerial career
- Erzeni
- * Club domestic league appearances and goals

Agim Hysen Murati (8 March 1953 – 15 September 2005) was an Albanian international football striker. During his career, Murati was recognised for "his ability to head the ball in the penalty area."

== Playing career ==
=== Early years ===
Agim Hysen Murati was born on 8 March 1953 in Shijak, the son of Hysen and Myhrie Murati. He was raised in Shijak and attended the high school. He developed a passion for the sport from an early age, joining Erzeni academy in 1967.

=== Club ===
Murati begun his footballing career with his hometown club Erzeni, making his way through ranks before joining Partizani Tirana in 1970 as a 17-year old. This transfer occurred after Murati impressed the manager Loro Boriçi in a friendly match against Shkëndija Tiranë, in which he scored a header.

He is known for having been the best goalscorer of the Albanian Superliga during the 1976–77, 1977–78 and 1978–79 seasons with 12, 14 and 14 goals respectively.

Murati is the only Partizani Tirana player to have scored a hat-trick in the capital derby versus Tirana; the hat-trick came on 28 December 1980 in a 3–2 win. All the goals were headers scored inside 27 minutes.

He is also known for the goal scored against Scotland's Celtic in the 1979–80 European Cup. His goal scored in the first leg on 19 September gave Partizani the 1–0, but they lost 4–1 in the second leg and were eventually eliminated 4–2 on aggregate.

=== International ===
Murati was a member of the Albania national football team. He earned his first international cap on 10 October 1973 by playing the second half of a 1–0 home win versus Finland.

== Style of play ==
He [Murati] is the king of air

— Manager Loro Boriçi after seeing Murati play.

Murati's most known skill was his heading ability; he is known to have scored more than 75% of his goals with headers.

== Managerial career ==
After ending his career, Murati continued his football career now as a manager; he coached the senior team of Erzeni for a short time and before that has also trained the youngster players in Tirana and Shijak.

== Personal life ==
Murati married Diana Murati in 1978; she gave birth to the couple's first children Donald on 13 October 1979. On 15 September 1983, Murati's wife gave birth to the couple's second children, a daughter named Anjeza.

He died on 15 September 2005 due to a heavy illness. His brother, Shkëlqim Murati, is a former player and manager.

== Legacy ==
On 27 December 2009, more than four years after his death, Murati was honoured with "Legend of Albanian Football" award. He was also received the Silver order of Naim Frashëri Title and Meritorious Master of Sport.

== International statistics ==
Appearances and goals by national team and year
National team	Year	Apps	Goals
Albania	1973	2	0
Albania	1976	1	0
Total		3	0

== Honours ==
Partizani Tirana

- Albanian Superliga: 1978–79, 1980–81
- Albanian Cup: 1979–80

Individual

- Albanian Superliga top goalscorer: 1976–77, 1977–78, 1978–79
