= Kosta Koça =

Albanian footballer and coach

Personal information
- Full name: Kosta Koça
- Date of birth: 11 March 1934 (age 92)
- Place of birth: Korçë, Albania

Youth career
- 1948–1949: Partizani
- 1949–1951: Skënderbeu

Senior career*
Years	Team	Apps	(Gls)
1951–1967	Skënderbeu		

Managerial career
- 1968–1975: Skënderbeu (youth)
- 1975–1982: Skënderbeu (assistant)
- 1982–1984: Skënderbeu
- 1988–1989: Skënderbeu
- * Club domestic league appearances and goals

Kosta Koça (born 11 March 1934) is an Albanian former footballer and coach who was also a national champion in cross country running, 400, 800, and 1500 meters as well as a two time national boxing champion.

== Club career ==
He spent his entire playing career with Skënderbeu Korçë and he also managed the club.

== Honours ==
- Albanian Superliga: 1

1949
