= 1978–79 Kategoria e Dytë =

Kategoria e Dytë
- Season: 1978–79
- Champions: Apolonia
- Promoted: Apolonia; Skënderbeu
- Relegated: Butrinti; Korabi

The 1978–79 Kategoria e Dytë was the 33rd season of a second-tier association football league in Albania.

== Group A ==
Pos	Team	Pld	W	D	L	GF	GA	GD	Pts	Promotion or relegation
1	Apolonia (C, P)	14	7	5	2	14	7	+7	19	Promotion to 1979–80 National Championship
2	Minatori (T)	14	6	4	4	20	16	+4	16	
3	10 Korriku	14	4	6	4	11	15	−4	14	
4	24 Maji	14	5	3	6	14	14	0	13	
5	Vetëtima	14	4	5	5	9	11	−2	13	
6	Ylli i Kuq	14	4	5	5	13	17	−4	13	
7	Dajti	14	3	6	5	13	13	0	12	
8	Butrinti (R)	14	4	4	6	15	16	−1	12	Relegation to 1979–80 Kategoria e Tretë

(C) Champions; (P) Promoted; (R) Relegated

== Group B ==
Pos	Team	Pld	W	D	L	GF	GA	GD	Pts	Promotion or relegation
1	Skënderbeu (P)	14	8	4	2	23	6	+17	20	Promotion to 1979–80 National Championship
2	Kastrioti	14	5	6	3	10	9	+1	16	
3	Përparimi	14	6	4	4	14	15	−1	16	
4	Sopoti	14	7	1	6	20	16	+4	15	
5	5 Shtatori	14	5	3	6	14	18	−4	13	
6	Erzeni	14	3	6	5	9	14	−5	12	
7	31 Korriku	14	3	4	7	13	15	−2	10	
8	Korabi (R)	14	1	8	5	5	15	−10	10	Relegation to 1979–80 Kategoria e Tretë

(P) Promoted; (R) Relegated

== Championship final ==
Team 1	Score	Team 2
Apolonia	1–0	Skënderbeu
