= Aristotel Samsuri =

Albanian footballer

Teli Samsuri
Personal information
- Full name: Aristotel Samsuri
- Place of birth: Qytezë, Korçë County, Albania
- Date of death: 1942–1944
- Place of death: Thessaloniki, Greece
- Position: Centre forward

Senior career*
Years	Team	Apps	(Gls)
1930–1940	Skënderbeu		(16+)
- * Club domestic league appearances and goals

Aristotel "Teli" Samsuri was a former Albanian football player who played for Skënderbeu Korçë between 1930 and 1940, where he won the 1933 National Championship and the golden boot in 1931 after scoring 9 league goals.

Following his retirement from football, he joined the Albanian Partisans and was captured by the Nazi German troops who put him in a concentration camp in Thessaloniki, Greece where he was executed some time between 1942 and 1944.

The ruling post-war Communist regime in Albania covered up his death; the official stance was that he had escaped from the concentration camp and had left Greece on a boat that sank and killed everyone on board except for Samsuri who being the only one to survive the incident, supposedly travelled to the French Upper Volta, modern–day Burkina Faso where he lived under the name Justin Osturno. This was all a lie told to Samsuri's family by the Communist Party, who even wrote fake letters to his family members posing as Samsuri under the name Justin Osturno. This all ended in 1981 and Samsuri was officially declared a martyr and his death was accepted as taking place during World War II.

== Honours ==
Skënderbeu Korçë

- Albanian Superliga: 1

1933

Individual

- Albanian Superliga top scorer (1): 1931
