= Servet Teufik Agaj =

Albanian footballer

Personal information
- Full name: Servet Teufik Agaj
- Place of birth: Gorë, Korçë County, Albania
- Position: Centre forward

Senior career*
Years	Team	Apps	(Gls)
1932–1938	Skënderbeu		
- * Club domestic league appearances and goals

Servet Teufik Agaj was an Albanian football player who played for Skënderbeu Korçë during the 1930s, where he won the club's first ever Albanian Championship in 1933, a season in which he also finished as top scorer with 7 goals in 5 games.

== Honours ==
- Albanian Superliga: 1

1933
