= Haki Korça =

Turkish-born Albanian footballer (died 2006)

Personal information
- Full name: Haki Korça
- Date of birth: c. 1916
- Place of birth: Istanbul, Turkey
- Date of death: February 2006 (aged 89)
- Place of death: Toronto, Ontario, Canada
- Position: Centre forward

Youth career
- –1931: Sportklub Tirana

Senior career*
Years	Team	Apps	(Gls)
1931–1941	Sportklub Tirana		
1941–194x	Roma		
- * Club domestic league appearances and goals

Haki Korça (c. 1916 – February 2006) was a Turkish-born Albanian football player who played for both Sportklub Tirana during the 1930s and early 1940s.

Korça tried his luck in Italian football during World War II along with compatriots Loro Boriçi and Sllave Llambi.

== Personal life and death ==
Korça was born in Istanbul, Turkey, but raised in Tirana, Albania. He later moved to Rome, Italy, before settling in Toronto, Canada. He died there in February 2006, at the age of 89.

== Honours ==
- Albanian Superliga: 2

1932, 1934
