= Dashnor Bajaziti =

Albanian footballer

Personal information
- Date of birth: 4 January 1955 (age 71)
- Place of birth: Kavajë, Albania
- Position: Striker

Youth career
- Besa Kavajë

Senior career*
Years	Team	Apps	(Gls)
1977–1988	Besa Kavajë		

International career
1980–1983	Albania	5	(0)

Managerial career
- 1985–1988: Besa Kavajë
- * Club domestic league appearances and goals

Dashnor Bajaziti (born 4 January 1955) is a former Albanian footballer who played as a striker for Besa Kavajë and the Albania National Football Team. He was a two-time top scorer of the Albanian Superliga.

== International career ==
He made his debut for Albania in a September 1980 FIFA World Cup qualification win at home over Finland and earned a total of 5 caps, scoring no goals. His final international was a March 1983 European Championship qualification match against West Germany.

== Managerial career ==
After his playing career, Bajaziti served as Besa head coach from 1985 to 1988.

== Political career ==
He was Albania's Deputy Minister of Tourism, Culture, Youth and Sports for the Republican Party of Albania. In May 2013 he was dismissed by party leader Fatmir Mediu due to internal conflicts.

== Personal life ==
His son, Darlien Bajaziti is also a football player.
