= KF Skënderbeu =

Albanian football club

Skënderbeu
- Full name: Klubi i Futbollit Skënderbeu
- Nicknames: Ujqërit e Dëborës (Snow Wolves); Bardhekuqtë (White and Reds); Juglindorët (Southeasterners)
- Founded: August 1926; 100 years ago
- Ground: Skënderbeu Stadium
- Capacity: 12,343
- Owner: Korçë Municipality
- President: Ardian Takaj
- Manager: Julian Ahmataj
- League: Kategoria Superiore
- 2025–26: Kategoria e Parë, 2nd (promoted)
- Website: kfskenderbeu.al
Home colours	Away colours

Klubi i Futbollit Skënderbeu is an Albanian professional football club based in Korçë, southeastern Albania. The club competes in the Kategoria Superiore, the first tier of Albanian football. An amateur club named Vllazëria Korçë was founded in 1909. The club in its current form was established on August 1926 by Fazlli Frashëri, known as Sportklub Korça, later changing its name to Skënderbeu, after Albania's national hero Skanderbeg. The club's home ground has been the Skënderbeu Stadium since it was built in 1957, and it now has a capacity of 12,343, of which 5,724 are seated.

Skënderbeu Korçë have won 8 league titles, with the first coming in 1933 before going on 78-year run without winning the league. The club won its first league title since 1933 in 2011, and they have won the league 6 more times since. The club had won six consecutive league titles since 2011, breaking the Albanian record which had been held by Dinamo Tirana who had won four consecutive titles in the 1950s.

In 2015, the club became the first Albanian side to reach the play-off round of the UEFA Champions League but they lost to Dinamo Zagreb and dropped into the UEFA Europa League, and became the first Albanian side to qualify for the group stages of a UEFA competition.

== History ==
=== Early years ===
The first football club in the city of Korçë was formed on 15 April 1909 under the name Vllazëria by politician and poet Hilë Mosi. The rise in the popularity of the sport resulted in a number of clubs being formed between 1920 and 1922, including clubs such as Përparimi and Sport Klub Korça. In 1923, the Albanian National Lyceum formed the Shpresa sports society. Skënderbeu was formed in 1925 when a large number of the young men and young men of the city were playing football regularly in local fields. The rise in popularity of the sport led to most neighbourhoods forming their own football teams, such as Zhgaba in 1926 and Leka i Madh, Pirro, Brekverdhit, Zjarri, Tigri and Diamanti in 1927, which competed in the city's first organised football competition held in 1928. These teams were local, however, and would only compete with one another, as the main football club to represent the city was Skënderbeu who overcome several problems at the start, some of which were even political. Skënderbeu was named after 15th century Albanian nobleman and national hero Skanderbeg.

The club quickly became the Alban's main football team, and in 1926 they began to play friendly games against teams from neighbouring countries, starting with Macedonian side Monastir, then part of the Kingdom of Yugoslavia. In two games played, Skënderbeu won 5–2 and then drew 2–2. Skënderbeu also played friendlies against Greek teams from Ermioni and Thessaloniki, which is modern day Aris FC. They also played against Kavala, who they beat 2–0 in Albania but lost 1–0 against in Greece.

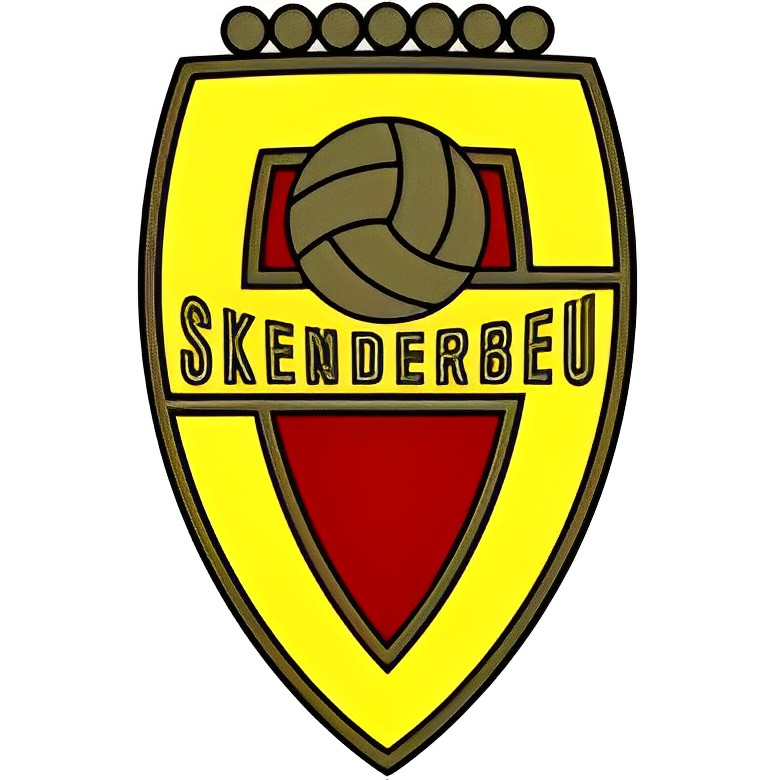
The old logo of KF Skënderbeu Korçë, used some years later after the club's foundation

=== 1930s championships ===
The club competed in the first ever national football competition in Albania, which was the 1930 championship. As the only club to represent Korçë nationally, Skënderbeu had huge popular support within the city, with similar support bases seen with the likes of KF Tirana and Vllaznia Shkodër, who all earned a name for themselves in the early stages of Albanian football. During the 1930 championship, Skënderbeu finished runners-up to KF Tirana, after forfeiting both championship playoff matches. The club won its first ever Albanian Championship just three years later in 1933, finishing two points ahead of Vllaznia. The championship winning side was: Klani Marjani, Kristaq Bimbli, Andrea Çani, Andon Miti, Lefter Petra, Fori Stasa, Nexhat Dishnica, Tomor Ypi, Thoma Vangjeli, Servet Teufik Agaj, Enver Kulla, Vasil Trebicka, Stavri Kondili, Aristotel Samsuri, with Qemal Omari as their manager.

In the same year, the club's striker Servet Teufik Agaj was the top goalscorer with seven league goals, an honour also won by his strike partner Aristotel Samsuri in 1931, also with seven goals. The following year, Skënderbeu strongly fought to retain their title, but only finished as runners-up once again to KF Tirana, with Samsuri being the club's top goalscorer that season with seven goals. In the next two championships held prior to World War II, Skënderbeu finished in fourth place in both years under manager Qemal Omari. The club ceased operations between 1938 and 1945 due to World War II, as there were no official tournaments held in Albania.

=== Post-war struggles ===
In 1945, the club began operating again. Supporters paraded in the streets of Korçë as the club announced the news. The majority of the players who were active in the 1930s were no longer playing football competitively, so the squad was virtually new, except for Klani Marjani, Bellovoda and Saro.

But the delight was short lived as the club struggled to match their performances before the war. In 1945, they finished fourth in Group B, consisting of six teams, and in the following 1946 season they finished fifth in Group A, just one point ahead of bottom place. Manager Tato Bimbli decided to bring in young players in order to revive the squad during the 1947 season, when the club also changed its name to Dinamo Korçë for the Communist Party, Bimbli's decision to bring in young players paid off as the club finished third in the league out of nine teams. The following season, however, turned out to be a disaster as they finished bottom of Group A with just a single point from seven games.

In 1949, the club changed its name to Korça, and they finished in sixth place out of nine teams in the same year. Manager Tato Bimbli left the club after having a difficult time in charge, and he was replaced by Spiro Koçe in 1950. In 1951, all Albanian teams were ordered by the Communist Party to be named "Puna", which literally translates to "work". During these years, the club remained a notable force, but with no relative success often finishing in mid-table in the league. Skënderbeu was also a three time finalist in the Albanian Cup in 1958, 1965 and 1976, in which they lost all three finals. They did, however, win the Albanian First Division in 1976–77 as well as three other times with the last win in 2008–09 season where Skënderbeu won the rights to move into the Albanian Superliga.

=== Recent dominance ===
==== 2009–10 ====
During the winter of 2009–10, the club was bottom of the league and facing the real possibility of relegation from the Albanian Superliga, but there were seismic changes in terms of the ownership and the board, as a new president in the shape of Red Bull Albania CEO Agim Zeqo was appointed. A new 16-member board was also elected, and a host of new donors attached themselves to the club, including some of Albania's most successful businessmen, such as Samir Mane, Irfan Hysenbelliu and Grigor Joti. Journalist Blendi Fevziu was also named as a donor, alongside national Minister of Finance Ridvan Bode and the prefect of Korçë, Niko Peleshi. The club's short-term goal was to remain in the Albanian Superliga, and they planned to win the league the following season. In order to escape relegation, the club brought in Mirel Josa as new head coach, along with a host of new players, both from Albania and neighbouring countries. They finished the league in 10th place out of 12 teams, meaning they entered a relegation playoff with the third placed Albanian First Division side KS Kamza, which they won 1–0 through a second minute Klodian Asllani goal to remain in the Albanian Superliga.

==== 2010–11 ====
Ahead of the 2010–11 season, the squad was revamped and under the guidance of Shkëlqim Muça as the head coach, new players were brought in, many of whom were Albanian internationals including Orges Shehi, Ditmar Bicaj, Endrit Vrapi, Jetmir Sefa, and Bledi Shkëmbi who was named captain following his return to his hometown club. Other quality signings made Skënderbeu the favourites to win the title. They were defeated by KF Tirana in their first ever Albanian Supercup game, and they spent much of the season in second place in the league, behind pacesetters Flamurtari Vlorë. Shkëlqim Muça was replaced by Shpëtim Duro as head coach in February and defeated Flamurtari Vlorë in his first game in charge to move closer to top spot, and he went on to guide the club to 11 wins in his 13 games in charge, to win the Albanian title for the first time since 1933 and to qualify for the UEFA Champions League qualifying round for the first time in their history. After winning the league for the first time in 78 years, club president Agim Zeqo said, "It was a great season and it was great to see our city and our fans enjoy this title. This town loves football and deserved this win. Let's do it again next season."

==== 2011-12 ====
The club made its Champions League debut against Cypriot side APOEL in the second qualifying round on 13 July 2011, and they lost 2–0 at home, before losing 4–0 away as they were knocked out of the competition. They continued a poor start to the season as they lost out to KF Tirana in the Albanian Supercup before the start of the Albanian Superliga season, where they also struggled. After only one win in their opening four games, head coach Shpëtim Duro was replaced by the Czech Stanislav Levý, who became the club's first foreign coach since Qemal Omari in the 1930s, who himself was of Albanian ancestry, making Levý the club's first truly foreign coach. He guided the club to a 14 match unbeaten run to reach the top of the table, and he only lost two games in charge as they narrowly beat Teuta Durrës to the title with only a single point between the sides to claim the only Champions League spot once again. In the Albanian Cup, Skënderbeu reached their first final since 1976, but they lost to KF Tirana as they continued their 100% losing record in Albanian Cup finals, having lost in 1958, 1965 and 1976 before the 2012 final.

==== 2012–13 ====
They kicked off the 2012–13 campaign with their first ever Champions League and European win, as they defeated Hungarian side Debrecen 1–0 at home through a Sebino Plaku goal to give them real hope of qualifying for the third qualifying round of the competition. In the away leg however Skënderbeu lost 3–0 and were knocked out after a 3–1 aggregate loss despite winning the first leg of the tie. They once again lost out to KF Tirana in the Albanian Supercup for the second consecutive season, but in the league they lost just once in their opening 20 games and remained in first place for the entire campaign as they went on to win the title for the third time in a row. In the Albanian Cup they were knocked out by Bylis Ballsh in the semi-final after a 2–1 aggregate loss over two legs, a result which came as a surprise as Skënderbeu had defeated all five teams they had faced during their cup run and were considered the favourites.

==== 2013–14 ====
The club won the Albanian Supercup for the first time in their history, after defeating KF Laçi. Later, Skënderbeu begun their 2013–14 campaign with their first ever Champions League tie as they draw 0–0 in the away leg against Neftchi Baku, which gave them a shade of hope in their dream about qualifying for the third qualifying round of the competition. In the home leg, they held the score to a tie in regular time and went to win 1–0 in the extra-time through a Nurudeen Orelesi goal in the 116th minute, qualifying for the first time in the third qualifying round of Champions League. They were drawn against Kazakh side Shakhter Karagandy and they lost 3–0 away, before winning 3–2 at home (temporarily being 3–0 up) and were knocked out of the competition. They dropped into the UEFA Europa League play-offs, making their debut in the second most important continental competition with a 0–1 loss to Ukrainian side Chornomorets Odesa in the away leg. At home, they recorded their first ever Europa League win, defeating Chornomorets 1–0 with an Andi Ribaj goal, giving Skënderbeu hopes of becoming the first Albanian team to qualify to the group stage of a European competition by progressing to the Europa League group stages. With a 1–1 tie, however, the match went to extra-time and later penalties, with Skënderbeu losing 6–7. In the championship, they began with a 1–0 victory over Besa Kavajë, then lost important matches against Flamutari and Kukësi, but recovered and claimed a winter lead place. They won their fourth consecutive league title after a 2–1 win over Partizani.

==== 2014–15 ====
The club won the Albanian Supercup for the second year in a row after defeating Flarmutari 1–0 in the final. In the new Champions League season, they had great expectations fed by a 0–0 draw in the second qualifying round against BATE Borisov away, but a 1–1 draw at home ended their hopes as were eliminated on away goals rule. In the league, they win the first two games, before losing to Partizani Tirana and a win against Kukësi was shortly followed by a defeat to Teuta Durrës. Then, they had an unbeaten run, with losses against only KF Tirana and KF Laçi. In the Albanian Cup, they were knocked out by Kukësi in the semi-finals. They won their fifth consecutive championship title and sixth overall.

==== 2015–16 ====
The summer transfer window was marked by the signing of the Albanian international Hamdi Salihi, who played at Rapid Wien. After a 2–2 draw against Laçi, however, they lost the Albanian Supercup 7–8 on penalties. They kicked off the 2015–16 campaign with their biggest ever Champions League and European win, as they defeated Northern Ireland side Crusaders 4–1. They lost the away match 2–3, but qualified to the third qualifying round for the second time with an aggregate 6–4 score and they faced Milsami Orhei. They beat Milsami 2–0 both home and away to become the only Albanian side to qualify to the UEFA Champions League play-offs, where they met Dinamo Zagreb. They were defeated 1–2 at home and 1–4 away and eliminated from Champions League. They were dropped into the UEFA Europa League group stages, becoming the first Albanian club to progress to the group stage of a European competition. Skënderbeu Korçë were drawn against Beşiktaş, Lokomotiv Moscow and Sporting Clube de Portugal. In matchday 1, their first ever group stage game, the club was defeated at home 0–1 by Beşiktaş after a hard fight between the two sides. In the next matchday, they lost 0–2 to Lokomotiv Moscow in Moscow. Their worst defeat in the European competition yet came the next matchday, a storming 1–5 loss to Sporting in the away leg at Lisbon, but also had the Albanian side scoring their first goal in the UEFA Europa League group stages. In the home match, Skënderbeu Korçë recorded a historic 3–0 win over Sporting, was one of the most important victories of a football club in Albania as Skënderbeu recorded their first points in a Europa League group stage game. They received 2 scoreless loses in the remaining matches respectively 2–0 away against Beşiktaş and 0–3 home against Lokomotiv Moscow to end the European campaign eliminating from group stage ranked in the last place. In the cup they advanced until the semi-final to be eliminated from Laçi on away goals rule after losing the first match away 1–0 and despite winning the second one 2–1. They won their sixth consecutive league title collecting 79 points 5 more than Partizani Tirana.

==== 2016–17 ====
Skënderbeu were banned from European football during the 2016–17 season for 10 years over match-fixing allegations. The decision was unprecedented in UEFA's history, both for the length of the ban as well as the fact that UEFA's conclusions were based primarily on statistical analysis of betting patterns.

==== 2017–18 ====
Skënderbeu entered Europa League, as they finished third in Albanian Superliga. They played against UE Sant Julia, defeating them 1–0 at home and 5–0 in Andorra, so they qualified. For the 2nd round, they played against the Kazakhstan outfit, Kairat. The match ended in a draw (1–1) in Kazakhstan and won 2–0 at home. They then went on to play the Czech Republic side, FK Mladá Boleslav and lost 2–1 on the night in the Czech Republic. The return match in Elbasan Arena saw Skënderbeu winning the regular time 2–1, while the extra periods yielded no further goals. Skënderbeu ultimately triumphed 4–2 on penalties. For the play-off round, they were drawn against Dinamo Zagreb for their second time, just like the UEFA Champions League play-off 2 years ago, where Skënderbeu were eliminated 6–2 on aggregate. They surprised Dinamo in the away match by scoring through Liridon Latifi in the 37th minute, but conceding in the very last minute. Even though Skënderbeu didn't win, they could hope for the Europa League qualification thanks to the away goal scored. Skënderbeu needed at least a goalless draw to progress to the next stage of the competition. In the return leg, that was exactly what happened. Skënderbeu qualified for the group stage for the second time in their history, in the process becoming the first Albanian team to win four qualifying rounds in the Europa League. Additionally, they were the only Albanian club to earn more than three points, which had been the record for the most points earned in the Europa League group stage by an Albanian club, set two years prior.

On 29 March 2018, Skënderbeu was handed a 10-year ban from European competition on the basis of conclusive evidence of match fixing. The club was additionally fined €1 million in one of the harshest punishments of a European club.

==== 2019–20 ====
On 12 July 2019, Skënderbeu's appeal against their 10-year ban from European competition was dismissed by the Court of Arbitration for Sport.

== Stadium ==
The club has played its home games at the Skënderbeu Stadium since it was built in 1957. The stadium was fully renovated in 2010 in order to gain accreditation from UEFA to host European games at the ground. The stadium has a capacity of 12,343 people all seater. It was approved by UEFA, to hold preliminary rounds of Champions League matches in 2011.

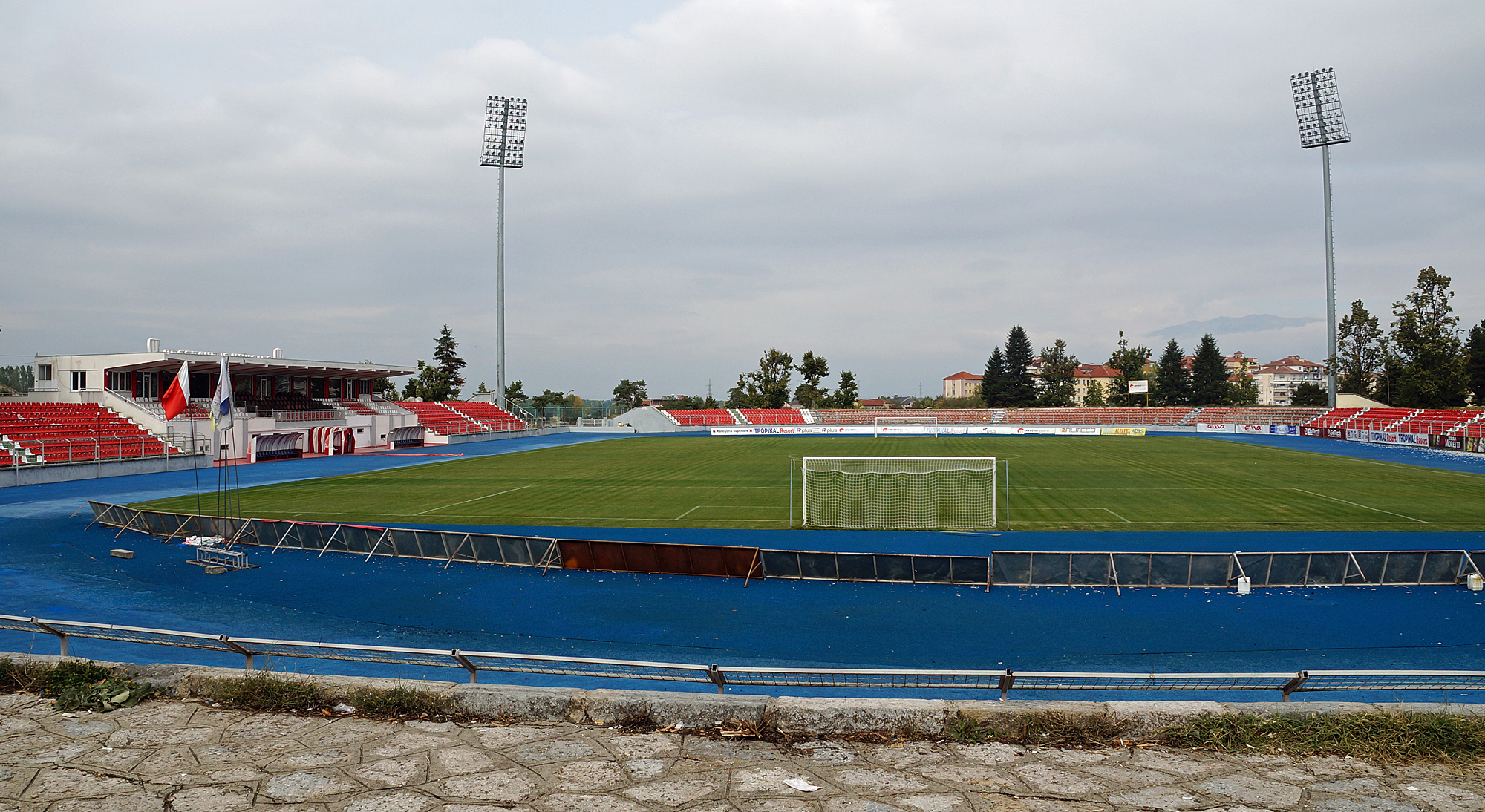

== Supporters ==
Skenderbeu is considered to be one of the best supported clubs in Albania, with the majority of fans live in the Korçë District, which has a population of just under 140,000. The main supporters' group for the club is called Ujqërit e Dëborës, which literally translates to snow wolves. The group was formed in 2008 and quickly became considered the club's main supporters' group. They are present at every home game at the Skënderbeu Stadium and they also organise trips to every away game of the season, also attending Albania national team games alongside other teams' supporters' groups. It is compulsory for every member to wear either the group's or Skënderbeu's clothing during games to distinguish between other fans. The group also has factions in different cities around the world where there are Albanian diaspora, including Toronto, Canada. Yearly membership to be an official member of the group costs 1000 lek (€7,14 or £5.86 as of 1 February 2014).

They have a fierce rivalry with KF Tirana's supports groups Tirona Fanatics, with both sets of fans being involved in hooligan activities since Skënderbeu's rise to prominence overtaking KF Tirana around 2010. In September 2013 prior to an away game in Tirana the Ujqërit e Deborës group called upon Tirona Fanatics members to reduce the tensions between the two sets of fans.

In November 2013, Skënderbeu was forced to play Flamurtari Vlorë behind closed doors due to the behaviour of Ujqërit e Dëborës against Partizani in a 3–0 win on 2 November. The game against Partizani Tirana was seen by attended by 5500 and there were no altercations between rival fans or any offensive chanting but the Albanian Football Association deemed the choreography of the Ujqërit e Dëborës to be worthy of a one match ban on supporters.

== Honours ==
=== Domestic ===
- Kategoria Superiore
  - Champions (8): 1933, 2010–11, 2011–12, 2012–13, 2013–14, 2014–15, 2015–16, 2017–18
  - Runners-up (3): 1930, 1934, 1976–77
- Kategoria e Parë
  - Winners (4): 1975–76, 2004–05, 2006–07, 2022–23
  - Runners-up (6): 1978–79, 1981–82, 1985–86, 1994–95, 2008–09, 2025–26
- Albanian Cup
  - Winners (1): 2017–18
  - Runners-up (6): 1958, 1964–65, 1975–76, 2011–12, 2016–17, 2020–21
- Albanian Supercup
  - Winners (3): 2013, 2014, 2018
  - Runners-up (4): 2011, 2012, 2015, 2016

=== Recent seasons ===
Season	Division	Pos.	Pl.	W	D	L	GS	GA	P	Cup	Supercup	Europe		Top scorer
2006–07	Kategoria e Parë	1st	24	17	5	2	46	18	56	FR	—	—	—	(Albania) Migen Memelli 13
2007–08	Kategoria Superiore	12th	33	3	2	28	26	80	11	FR	—	—	—	(Albania) Marius Ngjela 12
2008–09	Kategoria e Parë	2nd	30	20	5	5	60	32	65	FR	—	—	—	(Albania) Migen Memelli 15
2009–10	Kategoria Superiore	10th	33	11	9	13	41	41	42	QF	—	—	—	(Croatia) Miliam Guerrib 11
2010–11	Kategoria Superiore	1st	33	23	4	6	52	23	73	QF	—	—	—	(Argentina) Rafael Sosa 13
2011–12	Kategoria Superiore	1st	26	17	6	3	45	16	57	RU	RU	UCL	2QR	(Albania) Daniel Xhafaj 11
2012–13	Kategoria Superiore	1st	26	18	4	4	43	14	58	SF	RU	UCL	2QR	(Croatia) Pero Pejić 12
2013–14	Kategoria Superiore	1st	33	18	7	8	52	32	61	SF	W	UCL; UEL	3QR; PO	(Croatia) Pero Pejić 20
2014–15	Kategoria Superiore	1st	36	24	7	5	58	18	79	SF	W	UCL	2QR	(Brazil) Dhiego Martins 7
2015–16	Kategoria Superiore	1st	36	25	4	7	73	27	79	SF	RU	UCL; UEL	PO; GS	(Albania) Hamdi Salihi 27
2016–17	Kategoria Superiore	3rd	36	21	9	6	45	22	72	RU	RU	—	—	(Albania) Hamdi Salihi 15
2017–18	Kategoria Superiore	1st	36	22	6	8	68	41	72	W	—	UEL	GS	(The Gambia) Ali Sowe 21
2018–19	Kategoria Superiore	4th	36	15	12	9	45	30	55	SF	W	—	—	(Albania) Dejvi Bregu 9
2019–20	Kategoria Superiore	4th	36	17	7	12	42	43	58	QF	—	—	—	(Albania) Dejvi Bregu 10
2020–21	Kategoria Superiore	7th	36	9	10	17	34	55	37	RU	—	—	—	(Ghana) Alfred Mensah 7
2021–22	Kategoria Superiore	10th	36	4	14	18	23	43	26	QF	—	—	—	(Ghana) Alfred Mensah 9
2022–23	Kategoria e Parë	1st	24	13	9	2	37	12	48	SR	—	—	—	(Republic of Ireland) Abdul Temitope 12
2023–24	Kategoria Superiore	3rd	38	16	6	16	40	42	54	R16	—	—	—	(Nigeria) Nnamdi Ahanonu 9
2024–25	Kategoria Superiore	9th	36	9	11	16	35	45	38	QF	—	—	—	(Albania) Ermir Rashica 9
2025–26	Kategoria e Parë	2nd	33	24	5	4	57	25	77	R16	—	—	—	(Egypt) Saleh Nasr 18
2026–27	Kategoria Superiore										—	—	—	

== Records ==
- Biggest ever European home victory: (Albania) Skënderbeu Korçë 4–1 Crusaders (Northern Ireland) ; 14 July 2015
- Biggest ever European home defeat: (Albania) Skënderbeu Korçë 0–3 Lokomotiv Moscow (Russia) ; 10 December 2015
- Biggest ever European away victory: (Andorra) Sant Julià 0–5 Skënderbeu Korçë (Albania) ; 7 July 2017
- Biggest ever European away defeat: (Portugal) Sporting CP 5–1 Skënderbeu Korçë (Albania) ; 22 October 2015

=== Record transfers ===
Rank	Player	To	Fee	Year
1.	(Nigeria) Peter Olayinka	(Belgium) KAA Gent	€1.10k	2015
2.	(Albania) Liridon Latifi	(Hungary) Puskás AFC	€1.00k	2017
3.	(Albania) Kristal Abazaj	(Belgium) RSC Anderlecht	€750k	2018
4.	(Nigeria) Nnamdi Ahanonu	(Kazakhstan) FC Astana	€450k	2023
5.	(Kosovo) Fidan Aliti	(Sweden) Kalmar FF	€375k	2019

== European competitions record ==
=== By competition ===
As of 19 October 2017

Competition	App	Pld	W	D	L	GF	GA
Balkan Cup	1	4	2	0	2	3	8
UEFA Champions League	5	16	6	3	7	18	25
UEFA Europa League	3	22	7	5	10	24	29
Total	9	42	15	8	19	45	62

==== Matches ====
Season	Competition	Round	Club	Home	Away	Aggregate
1977–78	Balkans Cup	Group B	(Socialist Federal Republic of Yugoslavia) Rijeka	1–0	0–6	2nd
1977–78	Balkans Cup	Group B	(Greece) Aris	2–0	0–2	2nd
2011–12	UEFA Champions League	2Q	(Cyprus) APOEL	0–2	0–4	0–6
2012–13	UEFA Champions League	2Q	(Hungary) Debrecen	1–0	0–3	1–3
2013–14	UEFA Champions League	2Q	(Azerbaijan) Neftchi Baku	1–0 (aet)	0–0	1–0
2013–14	UEFA Champions League	3Q	(Kazakhstan) Shakhter Karagandy	3–2	0–3	3–5
2013–14	UEFA Europa League	PO	(Ukraine) Chornomorets Odesa	1–0 (aet)	0–1	1–1 (6–7 p)
2014–15	UEFA Champions League	2Q	(Belarus) BATE Borisov	1–1	0–0	1–1
2015–16	UEFA Champions League	2Q	(Northern Ireland) Crusaders	4–1	2–3	6–4
2015–16	UEFA Champions League	3Q	(Moldova) Milsami Orhei	2–0	2–0	4–0
2015–16	UEFA Champions League	PO	(Croatia) Dinamo Zagreb	1–2	1–4	2–6
2015–16	UEFA Europa League	Group H	(Turkey) Beşiktaş	0–1	0–2	4th
2015–16	UEFA Europa League	Group H	(Russia) Lokomotiv Moscow	0–3	0–2	4th
2015–16	UEFA Europa League	Group H	(Portugal) Sporting CP	3–0	1–5	4th
2017–18	UEFA Europa League	1Q	(Andorra) Sant Julià	1–0	5–0	6–0
2017–18	UEFA Europa League	2Q	(Kazakhstan) Kairat	2–0	1–1	3–1
2017–18	UEFA Europa League	3Q	(Czech Republic) Mladá Boleslav	2–1 (aet)	1–2	3–3 (2–1 p)
2017–18	UEFA Europa League	PO	(Croatia) Dinamo Zagreb	0–0	1–1	1–1 (a)
2017–18	UEFA Europa League	Group B	(Ukraine) Dynamo Kyiv	3–2	1–3	4th
2017–18	UEFA Europa League	Group B	(Serbia) Partizan	0–0	0–2	4th
2017–18	UEFA Europa League	Group B	(Switzerland) Young Boys	1–1	1–2	4th

Notes

- 1Q: First qualifying round
- 2Q: Second qualifying round
- 3Q: Third qualifying round
- PO: Play-off round

== Ranking ==
=== UEFA club coefficient ranking ===
As of 1 June 2021

Rank	Team	Points
286	(Gibraltar) Europa	4.000
287	(Latvia) Liepāja	4.000
288	(North Macedonia) Vardar Skopje	4.000
289	(Albania) Skënderbeu	4.000
290	(Malta) Hibernians	3.750
291	(Estonia) Levadia Tallinn	3.750
292	(Georgia (country)) Torpedo Kutaisi	3.750

== Players ==
=== Current squad ===
As of 1 September 2026

Note: Flags indicate national team as defined under FIFA eligibility rules; some limited exceptions apply. Players may hold more than one non-FIFA nationality.

No.	Pos.	Nation	Player
2	DF	ALB	Reild Kurti
3	DF	KOS	Luan Lleshi
4	DF	GRE	Georgios Lagonidis
5	MF	BRA	Victor Braga
6	DF	ALB	Kejdi Kaceli
7	FW	CGO	Dechan Moussavou
8	MF	MKD	Ennur Totre
9	FW	MKD	Nikola Velichkovski
10	FW	EGY	Saleh Nasr
11	FW	ENG	Amadou Diallo
12	GK	ALB	Ilir Dabjani
15	FW	NGR	Jeremiah Thomas
17	FW	GHA	Bismark Charles (captain)
21	DF	ALB	Kosta Vangjeli

No.	Pos.	Nation	Player
23	DF	ALB	Masimiliano Doda
25	MF	ALB	Dejvid Janaqi
26	MF	GUI	Ousmane Dramé
27	DF	ALB	Kleart Grazhdani
28	FW	GHA	Baba Musa
31	FW	ALB	Flavio Shkëmbi
32	DF	ALB	Ergi Zenullari
55	MF	ALB	Endri Agolli
67	MF	MKD	Xhemil Jahiji
70	MF	NIG	Salim Abubakar
71	GK	ALB	Marco Alia
77	DF	ALB	Klevis Shaqe
90	MF	SEN	Mohamed Ndiaye
97	DF	FRA	Amadou Seydi

=== Out on loan ===
Note: Flags indicate national team as defined under FIFA eligibility rules; some limited exceptions apply. Players may hold more than one non-FIFA nationality.

No.	Pos.	Nation	Player
—	GK	ALB	Amarildo Dervishaj (on loan at Kukësi)
—	DF	ALB	Spasian Nasto (on loan at Kastrioti)

No.	Pos.	Nation	Player
—	MF	NGR	Emmanuel Chukwunyere (on loan at Gramshi)

=== Under-19 squad ===
Note: Flags indicate national team as defined under FIFA eligibility rules; some limited exceptions apply. Players may hold more than one non-FIFA nationality.

No.	Pos.	Nation	Player
1	GK	ALB	Amarildo Dervishaj (captain)
3	DF	EGY	Ahmed Ziad
4	DF	ALB	Kristian Agolli
5	DF	ALB	Spasian Nasto
6	MF	GHA	Charles Oppong
7	FW	KOS	Ensar Beqiri
8	MF	ALB	Xhitjon Begaj
9	MF	ALB	Endri Agolli
10	MF	KOS	Elvidon Islami
11	FW	ALB	Fidel Korçari
12	GK	ALB	Eljor Demirshah

No.	Pos.	Nation	Player
15	MF	ALB	Sajmir Koçibelli
17	FW	ALB	Ruendi Zaçellari
18	FW	ALB	Flavio Shkëmbi
20	MF	MKD	Gazmend Lamallari
22	FW	ALB	Aleks Fiqi
29	DF	NGR	Emmanuel Emeodi
32	DF	ALB	Jetmir Laze
44	DF	ALB	Kleart Grazhdani
71	DF	ALB	Aleksandri Sorra
88	FW	ENG	Alex-Jason Amadin
92	MF	ALB	Deivi Ameli

=== Top scorers ===
- Top scorers in Albanian Superliga.

Season	Player	Goals
1931	(Albania) Aristotel Samsuri	9
1933	(Albania) Servet Teufik Agaj	7
2012–13	(Croatia) Pero Pejić	12
2015–16	(Albania) Hamdi Salihi	27
2017–18	(The Gambia) Ali Sowe	21

== Current staff ==
Position	Staff
President	(Albania) Ardian Takaj
Managing Director	(Albania) Arlind Boshku (Albania) Niko Pëlleshi (Albania) Petrika Konomi (Albania) Agim Zeqo (Albania) Spiro Bardhi
Technical Director	(Albania) Ilirjan Përmeti
Sporting Director	(Albania) Ardi Gjançi
Director	(Albania) Roland Shkelqimi
Head Coach	(Albania) Julian Ahmataj
Assistant Manager	(Albania) Hetlem Capja
Goalkeeping Coach	(Albania) Erjon Llapanji
Athletics Coach	(Albania) Marvin Kosta
Physiotherapist	(Albania) Dionis Prisoj
Doctor	(Albania) Gezim Qyli

== List of managers ==
- (Turkey) Qemal Omari (1932–1938)
- (Albania) Tato Bimbli (1945–1950)
- (Albania) Spiro Koçe (1950–1957)
- (Albania) S. Qirinxhi (1957–1961)
- (Albania) M. Prodani (1961–1966)
- (Albania) Ilia Shuke (1966–1975)
- (Albania) Aleko Pilika (1975–1982)
- (Albania) Kosta Koça (1982–1984)
- (Albania) Jani Kaçi (1987–1995)
- (Albania) Edmond Gëzdari (1995–1996)
- (Albania) Jani Kaçi (1996)
- (Albania) Aleko Pilika (1997)
- (Albania) Stefi Lubonja (1997)
- (Albania) Gjergji Ballço (1998–1999)
- (Albania) Luan Deliu (1999–2000)
- (Albania) Gjergji Ballço (2000)
- (Albania) Jani Kaçi (2001)
- (Albania) Jani Kaçi (2002–2004)
- (Albania) Mirel Josa (2005 – 18 Feb 2006)
- (Albania) Gjergji Ballço (18 Feb 2006 – 22 Feb 2006)
- (Albania) Agim Canaj (22 Feb 2006 –)
- (Albania) Faruk Sejdini ( – 10 Nov 2007)
- (Albania) Renato Rrapo (10 Nov 2007 – 31 Dec 2008)
- (Albania) Indrit Fortuzi (1 Jan 2009 – May 2009)
- (Albania) Gerd Haxhiu (Jul 2009 – 31 Dec 2009)
- (Albania) Andrea Marko (1 Jan 2010 – 7 Feb 2010)
- (Albania) Mirel Josa (7 Feb 2010 – May 2010)
- (Albania) Shkëlqim Muça (Jul 2010 – 17 Feb 2011)
- (Albania) Shpëtim Duro (17 Feb 2011 – 11 Oct 2011)
- (Czech Republic) Stanislav Levý (11 Oct 2011 – May 2012)
- (Albania) Mirel Josa (Jul 2012 – May 2016)
- (Italy) Andrea Agostinelli (Jun 2016 – Dec 2016)
- (Albania) Ilir Daja (Jan 2017 – Jun 2018)
- (Albania) Orges Shehi (Jul 2018 – Jun 2019)
- (Albania) Ilir Daja (Aug 2019 – Aug 2020)
- (Albania) Julian Ahmataj (Aug 2020 – Jan 2021)
- (Albania) Migen Memelli (Jan 2021 – Mar 2022)
- (Albania) Skënder Gega (Mar 2022 – May 2022)
- (Albania) Gentian Lici (May 2022 – Jun 2022)
- (Albania) Migen Memelli (Jun 2022 – Nov 2022)
- (Serbia) Ivan Gvozdenović (Nov 2022 – Dec 2024)
- (Albania) Ernest Gjoka (Dec 2024 – May 2026)
- (Albania) Julian Ahmataj (Jun 2026 –)

== Sponsorship ==
Companies that KF Skënderbeu Korçë currently has sponsorship deals with include:

Licensee	Product
Caffè Quaranta	Main Sponsor
Cohl's	Technical Sponsor
Bashkia Korçë	Co Sponsor
Republika Housepub	Co Sponsor
Almeco	Co Sponsor
Klinika Mjekësore Kristi	Co Sponsor

=== Kit sponsors ===
Period	Kit manufacturer	Shirt sponsor
2005–2007	Legea	—
2009–2010	—	Almaco
2010–2011	Adidas	Ama Caffe
2011–2015	Legea	Ama Caffe
2015–2019	Puma	Ama Caffe
2019–2021	Uhlsport	––
2021–2023	Joma	––
2023-2026	Uhlsport	Quaranta Caffè
2026-present	Cohl’s	ABI Bank
