= KF Besa Kavajë =

Albanian football club

Besa
- Full name: Klubi i Futbollit Besa Kavajë
- Nickname: Verdhezinjtë
- Founded: 25 October 1925; 100 years ago as Shoqata Sportive Adriatiku Adriatiku (1925–30) SK Kavaja (1931–35) Besa (1936–48) Kavaja 1949–50) Puna Kavajë (1951–57) Besa (1958–present)
- Ground: Stadiumi Besa
- Capacity: 8,000
- Owner: Bashkia Kavajë
- President: Nexhat Bizhdili
- Manager: Gugash Magani
- League: Kategoria e Parë
- 2025–26: Kategoria e Parë, 5th
Home colours	Away colours

Klubi i Futbollit Besa Kavajë is an Albanian professional football club based in Kavajë. They are currently competing in Kategoria e Parë, the second tier of Albanian football. Their home ground is Besa Stadium.

== History ==
=== Early years (1925–44) ===
Klubi Sportiv Besa was founded on 25 October 1925 as "Shoqata Kulturore Sportive Adriatiku", which was a multi-disciplinary sports club based in Kavajë, Albania. In 1930, the club changed its name to "Sport Klub Kavajë". That same year the football team played its first ever friendly at Mali i Robit, Golem, against an amateur team formed of students from the Albanian-American Institute of Agriculture. A short time later, SK Kavajë joined the newly formed Albanian Football Federation and participated in the 1930 second tier championship where they would repeat their participation for the next two seasons, before joining the top tier Kategoria e Parë in 1933. In their first top flight championship, SK Kavajë finished last in the 5 team league, losing 7 games and winning just one, a 2–1 victory over local rivals Teuta Durrës.

In 1935, under the leadership of chairman Irfan Berati, the club became an organised entity. The vice-chairman was Fehmi Kazazi, its secretary was Dervish Cara, and the committee included members Sulejman Karkini and Reshat Asllani. Rasim Sulejmani served as clerk, while Dhori Fora managed the trade of craft. The following year, the club was renamed "Besa Kavajë", also known as "Besa Sport Klub", derived from the name Besa, the Albanian cultural precept meaning "to keep the promise" and "word of honour".

During World War II, many members of the club lost their lives as soldiers, including Mehmet Babamusta, Adil Alushi, Sami Karriqi and Millan Radosalja. The activities of the club became very limited and support came primarily from the local residents of the city. There were no official competitions held in Albania at this time.

=== Rise (1945–65) ===
But between 1945 and 1950, the club experienced a revival which was due to young talented players coming through the ranks of the youth teams, including the likes of Qamil Teliti who went on to receive national success. During the 1945–46 season, the club won the unofficial Sports Federation President's Cup.

In 1958, the club achieved a second-place finish in the top tier Albanian Championship, narrowly losing out to Partizani Tirana for the title by one point. During that same season, they reached the semi-final of the Albanian Cup, again losing out to eventual winners Partizani. The club would go on to reach the finals of the Albanian Cup in 1961, losing to Partizani once again and also the following season in 1962–63, where they lost on penalties to 17 Nëntori. In 1963, Besa won the unofficial cup competition held by "Sporti" newspaper, and in 1965 it won the "Bashkimi" newspaper competition.

=== Golden generation (1965–75) ===
Club logo used during the 1970s

The period between 1965 and 1975 has been called the golden generation of football in Kavajë, due to the domestic achievements especially in the Albanian Cup which resulted in the club's first ever European games. In 1971, they finished as runners-up in the Albanian Cup after losing 2–0 in the finals to Dinamo Tirana. They repeated this feat the following year, losing on penalties in the cup final following a 2–2 draw with Vllaznia Shkodër, but as Vllaznia also won the league in that same year, this gave Besa the opportunity to participate in the UEFA Cup Winners' Cup in the 1972–73 season.

Their first European opponents were Danish side, Fremad Amager, who Besa managed to overcome on away goals following a 1–1 draw away in Copenhagen and a goalless draw at home. In the next round however they were beaten by Scottish side Hibernian, whom they lost to on aggregate 2–8, following a 1–7 away loss and a 1–1 draw at home. The end of the golden era was marked with the completion of the club's first purpose-built stadium, Besa Stadium. Construction was completed in 1974 with the new stadium having a capacity to seat 9,000 spectators.

=== Recent seasons ===
Besa confirmed their place in the 2007–08 UEFA Cup after a 3–2 win against neighbours KS Teuta in the 2006–07 Albanian Cup final. They met Bežanija of Serbia in the first qualifying round, drawing 2–2 away and 0–0 at home to progress on away goals. In the second qualifying round, they fell 0–3 in each leg to Bulgarian side Litex Lovech. In 2008, they qualified for the Intertoto Cup due to their third-place finish in the league, drawing Ethnikos Achna 0–0 at home and 1–1 in Cyprus and continued on away goals. In the 2nd round of the Intertoto cup they were eliminated by Grasshopper Zürich from Switzerland.

=== Legacy ===
Since its inception, many of the club's players have gone on to represent the Albania national team at all levels of international competition. Notably, Qamil Teliti scored the winning goal in the 1946 Balkan Cup final. The depth of talent emerging from Besa's youth system was evident in the 1956 derby between Dinamo and Partizani, which featured seven players deriving from the club's ranks, including legendary goalkeepers Qemal Vogli and Sulejman Maliqati. Two-time league top scorer Dashnor Bajaziti scored a hat-trick to crown the U–21 national team Balkan champions in 1978. Parid Xhihani would go on to score 7 goals in eight appearances for the same youth national team. Altin Rraklli was the national team's top scorer during the 1990s. Andi Lila and Sokol Cikalleshi represented Albania in its first ever qualification of a major international tournament, the UEFA Euro 2016. The latest prodigy to develop from the club's youth system, Haxhi Rrena, captained the U–15 national team, scoring 10 goals in fourteen appearances.

At the youth level, Besa U–19 have been crowned national champions twice, during the 1992–93 and 2008–09 seasons, respectively. Besa U–17 earned its only championship title during the 2017–18 season.

== Besa in European competitions ==
As of October 2015

Season	Competition	Round	Country	Club	Home	Away	Aggregate
1971	Balkans Cup	Group A	(Bulgaria)	Etar Veliko Tarnovo	2–1	0–2	1st
1971	Balkans Cup	Group A	(Socialist Federal Republic of Yugoslavia)	FK Crvenka	1–0	2–2	1st
1971	Balkans Cup	Final	(Greece)	Panionios	1–1	1–2	2–3
1972–73	UEFA Cup Winners' Cup	1R	(Denmark)	Fremad Amager	0–0	1–1	1–1
		2R	(Scotland)	Hibernian	1–1	1–7	2–8
1993–94	Balkans Cup	SF	(Greece)	PAS Giannina	1–3	2–0	3–3
2007–08	UEFA Cup	1QR	(Serbia)	Bežanija	0–0	2–2	2–2
		2QR	(Bulgaria)	Litex Lovech	0–3	0–3	0–6
2008–09	UEFA Intertoto Cup	1R	(Cyprus)	Ethnikos Achna	0–0	1–1	1–1
		2R	(Switzerland)	Grasshopper Zürich	0–2	1–2	1–4
2010–11	UEFA Europa League	2R	(Greece)	Olympiacos	0–5	1–6	1–11

- 1QR = 1st Qualifying Round
- 2QR = 2nd Qualifying Round
- 1R = 1st round
- 2R = 2nd round
- 3R = 3rd round

== Current squad ==
As of 1 July 2025

Note: Flags indicate national team as defined under FIFA eligibility rules; some limited exceptions apply. Players may hold more than one non-FIFA nationality.

No.	Pos.	Nation	Player
2	MF	GHA	Daniel Doudu
3	DF	ALB	Skerdian Perja
4	MF	ALB	Ersi Kapo
7	FW	ALB	Bedri Greca
8	MF	ALB	Skerdi Puqja
11	FW	GHA	Joel Bedzrah
12	GK	KOS	Dorant Ahmetaj
13	DF	GHA	Nurudeen Abdulai
15	FW	NGR	Tayo Abiodoun
16	MF	ALB	Nilsen Gjinaj
17	FW	SEN	Alphousseyni Dabo
18	MF	BRA	Ikaro Alexandre
19	DF	ALB	Joni Nurja
21	DF	ALB	Myslim Ramilli
23	FW	ALB	Ermir Spahiu

No.	Pos.	Nation	Player
29	DF	ALB	Erlis Frashëri
32	FW	ARG	Rodrigo Migone
33	DF	BRA	Gabriel Cruz
—	GK	ALB	Endri Dema
—	DF	BRA	Bianor Neto
—	DF	ALB	Reild Kurti
—	DF	KOS	Urim Veliu
—	MF	ALB	Edon Hasani
—	MF	NGR	Evans Aneni
—	MF	ALB	Fabian Beqja
—	MF	ALB	Redon Danaj
—	MF	BRA	William Cordeiro
—	FW	GHA	Godswill Chinwendu
—	FW	ALB	Patrik Treni

== List of managers ==
- (Albania) Rexhep Spahiu (1960–1971)
- (Albania) Muhamet Vila (1971–1973)
- (Albania) Fatmir Frashëri (1981–1982)
- (Albania) Dashnor Bajaziti (1985–1988)
- (Albania) Bajram Hushi (1990–1991)
- (Albania) Fisnik Kosova (1992–1993)
- (Albania) Zihni Gjinali (1994)
- (Albania) Fisnik Kosova (1994)
- (Albania) Haki Arkaxhiu (1995)
- (Albania) Azem Mullaliu (1995–1996)
- (Albania) Artan Lilamani (1996)
- (Albania) Bujar Pagria (1997)
- (Albania) Edmond Gëzdari (1997–1998)
- (Albania) Naim Hushi (1998)
- (Albania) Shkëlqim Muça (1998–1999)
- (Albania) Ilir Gjyla (1999–2000)
- (Albania) Ramadan Shehu (2001)
- (Albania) Faruk Sejdini (2001)
- (Albania) Edmond Gëzdari (2001)
- (Albania) Haxhi Arkaxhiu (2002)
- (Albania) Ramadan Shehu (2002)
- (Albania) Abdyl Kuriu (2002)
- (Albania) Ramadan Shehu (2002)
- (Albania) Astrit Sejdini (2003)
- (Albania) Ilir Gjyla (2003)
- (Albania) Ilir Duro (4 Jan 2005 – 28 Aug 2005)
- (Albania) Agim Canaj (28 Aug 2005 – 3 Dec 2005)
- (Albania) Ilir Shulku (3 Dec 2005 – 05 Apr 2006)
- (Albania) Përparim Daiu (05 Apr 2006 – 30 Jun 2006)
- (Albania) Hasan Lika (Jul 2006 – 25 Sep 2006)
- (Albania) Përparim Daiu (25 Sep 2006 – 20 Nov 2006)
- (Albania) Vasil Bici (20 Nov 2006 – 14 May 2007)
- (Albania) Ylli Teliti (14 May 2007 – Jun 2007)
- (Romania) Silviu Dumitrescu (Jul 2007 – 29 Nov 2007)
- (Albania) Iljaz Haxhiaj (29 Nov 2007 – 3 Dec Jun 2007)
- (Albania) Sulejman Starova (3 Dec 2007 – 6 Apr 2008)
- (Albania) Iljaz Haxhiaj (6 Apr 2008 – 16 Sep 2008)
- (Albania) Ilir Daja (16 Sep 2008 – 22 Feb 2009)
- (Albania) Ilir Biturku (22 Feb 2009 - Jun 2009)
- (Albania) Shpëtim Duro (Jul 2009 - 20 Sep 2010)
- (Albania) Përparim Daiu (20 Sep 2010 – 3 Nov 2010)
- (Albania) Gerd Haxhiu (3 Nov 2010 – Jun 2011)
- (Albania) Gugash Magani (Jul 2011 – Jun 2012)
- (Albania) Ilir Daja (Jul 2012 - Feb 2013)
- (Albania) Përparim Daiu (Feb 2013 – May 2013)
- (Albania) Ramadan Shehu (Jul 2013 – Aug 2013)
- (Albania) Artan Mërgjyshi (Aug 2013 - 14 Nov 2014)
- (Albania) Bledar Sinella (14 Nov 2014 - Apr 2015)
- (Albania) Dorjan Bubeqi (Apr 2015 – Nov 2015)
- (Albania) Ilir Gjyla (Mar 2016 - May 2016)
- (Albania) Bekim Kuli (28 Jul 2016 – ?)
- (Albania) Ndriçim Kashami (Sep 2016 – Oct 2016)
- (Albania) Julian Ahmataj (Oct 2016 – May 2017)
- (Albania) Artion Poçi (Aug 2017 – Sep 2017)
- (Albania) Bledar Sinella (Sep 2017 - May 2018)
- (Albania) Gentian Begeja (26 Jun 2018 - Dec 2018)
- (Albania) Gugash Magani (Jan 2019 – Feb 2020 )
- (Albania) Ndricim Kashami (Feb 2020 – Nov 2020)
- (Albania) Artan Mërgjyshi (Nov 2020 - Apr 2021)
- (Albania) Ndricim Kashami (Apr 2021 – Oct 2021)
- (Albania) Dorjan Bubeqi (Oct 2021 – May 2022)
- (Albania) Gugash Magani (Jun 2022 – Jun 2023)
- (Albania) Lorenc Pashja (Jun 2023 – Feb 2024)
- (Kosovo) Fidaim Haxhiu (Feb 2024 – Mar 2024)
- (Albania) Dorjan Bubeqi (Mar 2024 – May 2024)
- (Albania) Mirel Josa (5 Jun 2024 – 25 Dec 2024)
- (Albania) Emiliano Çela (26 Dec 2024 – 3 Sep 2025)
- (Albania) Shpëtim Duro (4 Sep 2025 – 3 Dec 2025)
- (Albania) Gugash Magani (5 Dec 2025 – )

== Honours ==
- Kategoria Superiore
  - Runners-up (2): 1958, 2009–10
- Kategoria e Parë
  - Winners (3): 1932, 1977–78, 1985–86
  - Runners-up (3): 1999–2000, 2001–02, 2004–05
- Albanian Cup
  - Winners (2): 2006–07, 2009–10
  - Runners-up (6): 1961, 1962–63, 1970–71, 1971–72, 1981–82, 1991–92
- Albanian Supercup
  - Winners (1): 2010
  - Runners-up (1): 2007

== Records ==
- Biggest Victories: 9–1 vs Ismail Qemali (1937); 12–0 vs Bashkimi Elbasanas (1945); 7–0 vs Shkumbini (17.02.1963); 11–0 vs Apolonia Fier (1965); 8–1 vs Poliçani (28.08.1991); 7–1 vs Tirana (1992)
- Biggest Defeats: 1–9 vs Skënderbeu (16.04.1933); 0–6 vs Partizani (09.02.1975); 1–7 vs Tirana (12.09.2003)
- Most points in a season: 56 (2007–08)
- Fewest points in a season: 1 (1948)
- Most ties in a season: 14 (1973–74, 1976–77, 1989–90)
- Fewest ties in a season: 0 (1933)
- Most losses in a season: 23 (2003–04)
- Fewest losses in a season: 3 (1958)
- Best Goal Differential: +27 (1937)
- Worst Goal Differential: -43 (2003–04)

== Sponsors ==
- Official kit sponsor: Porta Kavalja
- Official Sponsor: Bashkia Kavajë

== See also ==
- KF Golemi
- KF Luzi i Vogël 2008
- KF Egnatia
